= EuroBasket Women 2019 final round =

The final round of the EuroBasket Women 2019 took place between 2 and 7 July 2019.

== Qualified teams ==
The group winners qualified for the quarterfinals while the second- and third placed teams advanced to the qualification round.

Group	Winners	Runners-up	Third place
A	Spain	Great Britain	Latvia
B	France	Sweden	Montenegro
C	Hungary	Italy	Slovenia
D	Serbia	Belgium	Russia

== Bracket ==
Qualification for quarterfinals
2 July
Italy	54
Russia	63
1 July
Sweden	77
Latvia	62
2 July
Belgium	72
Slovenia	67
1 July
Great Britain	92
Montenegro	71

Quarterfinals
4 July
Spain	78
Russia	54
4 July
Serbia	87
Sweden	49
4 July
France (OT)	84
Belgium	80
4 July
Hungary	59
Great Britain	62

Semifinals
6 July
Spain	71
Serbia	66
6 July
France	63
Great Britain	56

Final
7 July
Spain	86
France	66
Third place game
7 July
Serbia	81
Great Britain	55

Class. games to OQTs

Class. game to OQTs
6 July
Russia	52
Sweden	57

Class. game to OQTs
6 July
Belgium	72
Hungary	56

Times for games in Riga are UTC+3 and in Belgrade UTC+2.

== Qualification for quarterfinals ==
1 July 2019
18:30

Boxscore

Sweden	77–62	Latvia
Scoring by quarter: 23–14, 22–9, 14–17, 18–22
Pts: F. Eldebrink 21; Rebs: Magarity 11; Asts: E. Eldebrink 8		Pts: Dikaioulaku 14; Rebs: Brumermane 9 Asts: Strautmane 5

Arēna Rīga, Riga
Attendance: 2,250
Referees: Jasmina Juras (SRB), Özlem Yalman (TUR), Mila Čavara (BIH)

1 July 2019
21:00

Boxscore

Great Britain	92–71	Montenegro
Scoring by quarter: 22–14, 22–27, 25–19, 23–11
Pts: Fagbenle 29; Rebs: Leedham 8 Asts: Leedham 7		Pts: Mujović 16; Rebs: Johnson, Jovanović 6 Asts: Jovanović 5

Arēna Rīga, Riga
Attendance: 200
Referees: Maj Forsberg (DEN), Amy Bonner (USA), Andrei Sharapa (BLR)

2 July 2019
18:00

Boxscore

Belgium	72–67	Slovenia
Scoring by quarter: 10–20, 24–12, 19–19, 19–16
Pts: Allemand 25; Rebs: Mestdagh 11; Asts: Meesseman 5		Pts: three players 15; Rebs: Friškovec, Lisec 7 Asts: Barič 9

Štark Arena, Belgrade
Attendance: 338
Referees: Gentian Cici (ALB), Mārtiņš Kozlovskis (LAT), Dariusz Zapolski (POL)

2 July 2019
20:30

Boxscore

Italy	54–63	Russia
Scoring by quarter: 17–17, 16–12, 12–18, 9–16
Pts: Zandalasini 24; Rebs: Dotto 7 Asts: Dotto 5		Pts: Vadeeva 19; Rebs: Vadeeva 9 Asts: Shilova 4

Štark Arena, Belgrade
Attendance: 434
Referees: Vasiliki Tsaroucha (GRE), Marius Ciulin (ROU), Radomir Vojinović (MNE)

== Quarterfinals ==
4 July 2019
12:30

Boxscore

Hungary	59–62	Great Britain
Scoring by quarter: 13–15, 9–17, 16–16, 21–14
Pts: Turner 11; Rebs: Turner 8 Asts: Turner 4		Pts: Fagbenle 29; Rebs: Leedham 12; Asts: Leedham 8

Štark Arena, Belgrade
Attendance: 457
Referees: Vasiliki Tsaroucha (GRE), Marius Ciulin (ROU), Zdenko Tomašovič (SVK)

4 July 2019
15:00

Boxscore

Spain	78–54	Russia
Scoring by quarter: 19–16, 25–12, 17–17, 17–9
Pts: Ndour 24; Rebs: Ndour 12; Asts: Cruz 6		Pts: Levchenko 8 Rebs: Vadeeva 10; Asts: Levchenko 3

Štark Arena, Belgrade
Attendance: 651
Referees: Özlem Yalman (TUR), Radomir Vojinović (MNE), Thomas Bissuel (FRA)

4 July 2019
18:00

Boxscore

France	84–80 (OT)	Belgium
Scoring by quarter: 27–16, 8–16, 19–22, 14–14, Overtime: 16–12
Pts: Gruda 33; Rebs: Gruda 10; Asts: Époupa, Johannès 5		Pts: Meesseman 24; Rebs: Mestdagh 10; Asts: Mestdagh 7

Štark Arena, Belgrade
Attendance: 1,083
Referees: Jasmina Juras (SRB), Andrei Sharapa (BLR), Saša Maričić (SRB)

4 July 2019
20:30

Boxscore

Serbia	87–49	Sweden
Scoring by quarter: 21–12, 22–9, 21–12, 23–16
Pts: Dabović 19; Rebs: three players 5 Asts: three players 4		Pts: F. Eldebrink 12; Rebs: Zahui 10; Asts: Loyd, Lundquist 2

Štark Arena, Belgrade
Attendance: 5,938
Referees: Amy Bonner (USA), Mārtiņš Kozlovskis (LAT), Dariusz Zapolski (POL)

== Class. games to OQTs ==
6 July 2019
12:30

Boxscore

Belgium	72–56	Hungary
Scoring by quarter: 12–17, 27–8, 18–12, 15–19
Pts: Allemand, Mestdagh 17; Rebs: Linskens, Mestdagh 6 Asts: Meesseman 7		Pts: Raksányi 11; Rebs: Turner 10; Asts: Turner 5

Štark Arena, Belgrade
Attendance: 348
Referees: Mārtiņš Kozlovskis (LAT), Jelena Tomić (CRO), Ivor Matějek (CZE)

6 July 2019
15:00

Boxscore

Russia	52–57	Sweden
Scoring by quarter: 10–12, 16–15, 13–16, 13–14
Pts: Vadeeva 15; Rebs: Vadeeva 8 Asts: Shilova, Vadeeva 3		Pts: Loyd 16; Rebs: Halvarsson 10; Asts: E. Eldebrink, Halvarsson 3

Štark Arena, Belgrade
Attendance: 250
Referees: Jasmina Juras (SRB), Thomas Bissuel (FRA), Andrada Csender (ROU)

== Semifinals ==
6 July 2019
18:00

Boxscore

France	63–56	Great Britain
Scoring by quarter: 12–16, 22–18, 18–12, 11–10
Pts: Johannès 20; Rebs: Gruda 10; Asts: Johannès 5		Pts: Vanderwal 12; Rebs: Leedham 8 Asts: Samuelson 6

Štark Arena, Belgrade
Attendance: 1,659
Referees: Özlem Yalman (TUR), Gentian Cici (ALB), Zdenko Tomašovič (SVK)

6 July 2019
20:30

Boxscore

Spain	71–66	Serbia
Scoring by quarter: 21–11, 16–19, 21–20, 13–16
Pts: Ndour 17; Rebs: Nicholls 10; Asts: Domínguez, Palau 5		Pts: Brooks 17; Rebs: Petrović 6 Asts: Petrović 6

Štark Arena, Belgrade
Attendance: 7,194
Referees: Maj Forsberg (DEN), Vasiliki Tsaroucha (GRE), Amy Bonner (USA)

== Third place game ==
7 July 2019
17:30

Boxscore

Serbia	81–55	Great Britain
Scoring by quarter: 25–16, 15–17, 21–6, 20–16
Pts: Petrović 14; Rebs: Petrović 13; Asts: Stanaćev 6		Pts: Fagbenle 23; Rebs: Leedham 10; Asts: Vanderwal 5

Štark Arena, Belgrade
Attendance: 3,733
Referees: Marius Ciulin (ROU), Amy Bonner (USA), Mārtiņš Kozlovskis (LAT)

== Final ==
7 July 2019
20:30

Boxscore

Spain	86–66	France
Scoring by quarter: 32–21, 18–15, 20–20, 16–10
Pts: Xargay 23; Rebs: Gil 10; Asts: Cruz, Xargay 4		Pts: Gruda 18; Rebs: Gruda 6 Asts: three players 4

Štark Arena, Belgrade
Attendance: 3,622
Referees: Jasmina Juras (SRB), Maj Forsberg (DEN), Özlem Yalman (TUR)
