= EuroBasket Women 2019 final =

Final of EuroBasket Women 2019

EuroBasket Women 2019 Final
Spain	France
	1	2	3	4	Total
Spain	32	18	20	16	86
France	21	15	20	10	66
- Date: 7 July 2019
- Venue: Štark Arena, Belgrade
- Attendance: 3,622

The 2019 FIBA Women's EuroBasket final was played at the Štark Arena in Belgrade, Serbia, on 7 July 2019 between defending champions Spain and previous runners-up France.

Spain won their fourth title winning 86–66 in the final.

== Road to the final ==
Spain
Round
France
Opponent
Result

Opponent
Result
Ukraine
95–77
Game 1
Czech Republic
74–61
Great Britain
67–59
Game 2
Montenegro
88–53
Latvia
59–56
Game 3
Sweden
71–65

Pos	Team	Pld	W	L	PF	PA	PD	Pts	Qualification
1	Spain	3	3	0	221	192	+29	6	Quarterfinals
2	Great Britain	3	2	1	201	181	+20	5	Qualification for quarterfinals
3	Latvia (H)	3	1	2	198	207	−9	4	Qualification for quarterfinals
4	Ukraine	3	0	3	205	245	−40	3	

Source: FIBA
Rules for classification: 1) Points; 2) Head-to-head results; 3) Points difference; 4) Points scored.
(H) Hosts
First round

Pos	Team	Pld	W	L	PF	PA	PD	Pts	Qualification
1	France	3	3	0	233	179	+54	6	Quarterfinals
2	Sweden	3	1	2	196	193	+3	4 (Note: Sweden 3 Pts, +9 PD; Montenegro 3 Pts, −3 PD; Czech Republic 3 Pts, −6 PD)	Qualification for quarterfinals
3	Montenegro	3	1	2	174	212	−38	4	Qualification for quarterfinals
4	Czech Republic	3	1	2	189	208	−19	4	

Source: FIBA
Rules for classification: 1) Points; 2) Head-to-head results; 3) Points difference; 4) Points scored.
Notes:
Opponent
Result

Opponent
Result
Bye
Qual. for quarterfinals
Bye
Russia
78–54
Quarterfinals
Belgium
84–80 (OT)
Serbia
71–66
Semifinals
Great Britain
63–56

== Match details ==
7 July 2019
20:30

Boxscore

Spain	86–66	France
Scoring by quarter: 32–21, 18–15, 20–20, 16–10
Pts: Xargay 23; Rebs: Gil 10; Asts: Cruz, Xargay 4		Pts: Gruda 18; Rebs: Gruda 6 Asts: three players 4

Štark Arena, Belgrade
Attendance: 3,622
Referees: Jasmina Juras (SRB), Maj Forsberg (DEN), Özlem Yalman (TUR)

Starters:			Pts	Reb	Ast
G	9	Laia Palau	12	3	3
G	15	Anna Cruz	6	2	4
F	10	Marta Xargay	23	3	4
F	4	Laura Nicholls	6	6	3
C	45	Astou Ndour	4	4	1
Reserves:					
F	3	Andrea Vilaró	0	0	0
G	5	Cristina Ouviña	9	2	1
G	6	Silvia Domínguez	13	4	2
G	13	Tamara Abalde	0	1	0
F	17	María Pina	2	1	0
F	18	Queralt Casas	2	0	0
C	24	Laura Gil	9	10	2
Head coach:
(Spain) Lucas Mondelo

Spain	France

ESP	Statistics	FRA
22/39 (56%)	2-pt field goals	21/40 (53%)
9/23 (39%)	3-pt field goals	4/15 (27%)
15/22 (68%)	Free throws	12/21 (57%)
12	Offensive rebounds	7
27	Defensive rebounds	20
39	Total rebounds	27
20	Assists	18
13	Turnovers	16
10	Steals	8
5	Blocks	1
20	Fouls	21

Starters:			Pts	Reb	Ast
G	0	Olivia Époupa	4	4	4
G	17	Marine Johannès	7	1	2
F	11	Valériane Ayayi	7	2	1
F	5	Endéné Miyem	11	3	0
C	7	Sandrine Gruda	18	6	4
Reserves:					
G	3	Ornella Bankole	0	3	2
G	4	Marine Fauthoux	0	0	0
F	6	Alexia Chartereau	0	1	0
C	12	Iliana Rupert	0	0	0
G	14	Bria Hartley	17	2	4
C	21	Marième Badiane	0	2	0
G	88	Sara Chevaugeon	2	2	1
Head coach:
(France) Valérie Garnier
