= EuroBasket Women 2019 Group A =

Group A of the EuroBasket Women 2019 took place between 27 and 30 June 2019. The group consisted of Great Britain, Latvia, Spain and Ukraine and played its games at Riga, Latvia.

== Standings ==
Pos	Team	Pld	W	L	PF	PA	PD	Pts	Qualification
1	Spain	3	3	0	221	192	+29	6	Quarterfinals
2	Great Britain	3	2	1	201	181	+20	5	Qualification for quarterfinals
3	Latvia (H)	3	1	2	198	207	−9	4	Qualification for quarterfinals
4	Ukraine	3	0	3	205	245	−40	3	

Source: FIBA
Rules for classification: 1) Points; 2) Head-to-head results; 3) Points difference; 4) Points scored.
(H) Hosts

All times are local (UTC+3).

== Matches ==
=== Great Britain vs Latvia ===
27 June 2019
18:30

Boxscore

Great Britain	74–60	Latvia
Scoring by quarter: 24–17, 17–22, 24–10, 9–11
Pts: Leedham 24; Rebs: Fagbenle 10; Asts: Leedham 6		Pts: Dikaioulaku 17; Rebs: Dikaioulaku 11; Asts: Dikaioulaku 7

Arēna Rīga, Riga
Attendance: 2,900
Referees: Jasmina Juras (SRB), Sasa Maričić (SRB), Elena Chernova (RUS)

=== Ukraine vs Spain ===
27 June 2019
21:00

Boxscore

Ukraine	77–95	Spain
Scoring by quarter: 23–19, 19–28, 18–29, 17–19
Pts: Iagupova 38; Rebs: three players 6 Asts: Iagupova 7		Pts: Xargay 31; Rebs: Nicholls 9 Asts: Palau 7

Arēna Rīga, Riga
Attendance: 350
Referees: Maj Forsberg (DEN), Viola Györgyi (NOR), Tamás Földházi (HUN)

=== Latvia vs Ukraine ===
28 June 2019
18:30

Boxscore

Latvia	82–74	Ukraine
Scoring by quarter: 15–14, 26–20, 17–14, 24–26
Pts: Dikaioulaku 33; Rebs: Brumermane 9 Asts: Dikaioulaku 7		Pts: Iagupova 28; Rebs: Iagupova 8 Asts: Iagupova 7

Arēna Rīga, Riga
Attendance: 3,000
Referees: Sasa Maričić (SRB), Mila Čavara (BIH), Beniamino Attard (ITA)

=== Spain vs Great Britain ===
28 June 2019
21:00

Boxscore

Spain	67–59	Great Britain
Scoring by quarter: 14–14, 17–20, 17–9, 19–16
Pts: Ndour 23; Rebs: Ndour 8 Asts: Palau 5		Pts: Fagbenle 20; Rebs: Fagbenle, Leedham 5 Asts: Fagbenle 3

Arēna Rīga, Riga
Attendance: 300
Referees: Maj Forsberg (DEN), Blaž Zupančič (SLO), Geert Jacobs (BEL)

=== Ukraine vs Great Britain ===
30 June 2019
13:00

Boxscore

Ukraine	54–68	Great Britain
Scoring by quarter: 14–19, 10–16, 21–9, 9–24
Pts: Iagupova 21; Rebs: Iagupova, Naumenko 7 Asts: Bilotserkivska 5		Pts: Fagbenle 22; Rebs: Fagbenle 8 Asts: three players 4

Arēna Rīga, Riga
Attendance: 293
Referees: Sasa Maričić (SRB), Mila Čavara (BIH), Tamás Földházi (HUN)

=== Latvia vs Spain ===
30 June 2019
18:30

Boxscore

Latvia	56–59	Spain
Scoring by quarter: 17–17, 8–18, 10–14, 21–10
Pts: Dikaioulaku 19; Rebs: Pilābere 8 Asts: Pulvere 4		Pts: Ndour 16; Rebs: Ndour 12; Asts: Ouviña 4

Arēna Rīga, Riga
Attendance: 3,522
Referees: Amy Bonner (USA), Jasmina Juras (SRB), Geert Jacobs (BEL)
