= 2020 FIBA Women's Olympic Qualifying Tournaments – Belgrade 2 =

2020 FIBA World Olympic Qualifying Tournament for Women
Belgrade, Serbia

Tournament details
- Host country: Serbia
- Dates: 6–9 February
- Teams: 4 (from 2 federations)
- Venue: 1 (in 1 host city)

Final positions
- Champions: China

Tournament statistics
- MVP: (China) Li Meng
- Top scorer: (United Kingdom) Fagbenle (25.0)
- Top rebounds: (China) Li Y. (8.0)
- Top assists: (United Kingdom) Leedham (7.3)
- PPG (Team): China (83.3)
- RPG (Team): China (44.3)
- APG (Team): Spain (23.0)

Official website
- WOQT Serbia

The 2020 FIBA Women's Olympic Qualifying Tournament in Foshan/Belgrade was one of four 2020 FIBA Women's Olympic Qualifying Tournaments. The tournament was planned to be held in Foshan, China, from 6 to 9 February 2020. The tournament was played in Belgrade, Serbia due to concerns about the coronavirus pandemic.

China, Spain and South Korea qualified for the Olympics.

== Teams ==
Team	Qualification	Date of qualification	FIBA World Ranking
China	1st at the Asia/Oceania pre-qualifying tournaments–Group A	17 November 2019	8th
Spain	1st at the EuroBasket Women 2019	4 July 2019	3rd
Great Britain	4th at the EuroBasket Women 2019	4 July 2019	18th
South Korea	2nd at the Asia/Oceania pre-qualifying tournaments–Group A	17 November 2019	19th

== Venue ==
It was originally going to be played at the Foshan International Sports and Cultural Center in Foshan, China. But due to the COVID-19 pandemic, it was changed to Belgrade, Serbia.

Belgrade	2020 FIBA Women's Olympic Qualifying Tournaments – Belgrade 2 (Serbia)
Aleksandar Nikolić Hall	2020 FIBA Women's Olympic Qualifying Tournaments – Belgrade 2 (Serbia)
Capacity: 8,000	2020 FIBA Women's Olympic Qualifying Tournaments – Belgrade 2 (Serbia)

== Standings ==
Pos	Team	Pld	W	L	PF	PA	PD	Pts	Qualification
1	China	3	3	0	250	198	+52	6	Summer Olympics
2	Spain	3	2	1	224	179	+45	5	Summer Olympics
3	South Korea	3	1	2	188	262	−74	4	Summer Olympics
4	Great Britain	3	0	3	224	247	−23	3	

Source: FIBA
Rules for classification: 1) Points; 2) Head-to-head results; 3) Points difference; 4) Points scored.

== Results ==
All times are local (UTC+1).

6 February 2020
12:00

Boxscore

China	86–76	Great Britain
Scoring by quarter: 21–26, 22–20, 22–13, 21–17
Pts: three players 16; Rebs: Han, Wang 5 Asts: Shao 4		Pts: Fagbenle 26; Rebs: Leedham 5 Asts: Leedham 6

Aleksandar Nikolić Hall, Belgrade
Referees: Grant Todey (USA), Natalia Cuello (DOM), Julio Anaya (PAN)

6 February 2020
14:30

Boxscore

South Korea	46–83	Spain
Scoring by quarter: 16–19, 9–24, 7–20, 14–20
Pts: Park H. 17; Rebs: Kim H. 6 Asts: Bae, Park H. 3		Pts: Rodríguez 14; Rebs: Ouviña 7 Asts: Domínguez 6

Aleksandar Nikolić Hall, Belgrade
Referees: Rabah Noujaim (LIB), Andrei Sharapa (BLR), Özlem Yalman (TUR)

8 February 2020
12:00

Boxscore

Spain	62–64	China
Scoring by quarter: 15–12, 6–22, 17–18, 24–12
Pts: Torrens 17; Rebs: Nicholls 12; Asts: Palau 8		Pts: Li M., Li Y. 13; Rebs: Li Y. 15; Asts: Li M. 4

Aleksandar Nikolić Hall, Belgrade
Referees: Julio Anaya (PAN), Natalia Cuello (DOM), Arnaud Kom Njilo (CMR)

8 February 2020
14:30

Boxscore

Great Britain	79–82	South Korea
Scoring by quarter: 19–25, 18–20, 17–25, 25–12
Pts: Fagbenle 28; Rebs: Samuelson 9 Asts: Leedham 10		Pts: Kang 26; Rebs: Park J. 9 Asts: Kim D., Park H. 6

Aleksandar Nikolić Hall, Belgrade
Referees: Rabah Noujaim (LIB), Grant Todey (USA), Andrei Sharapa (BLR)

9 February 2020
12:00

Boxscore

South Korea	60–100	China
Scoring by quarter: 13–19, 11–28, 20–24, 16–29
Pts: Kang 17; Rebs: Kim H. 10; Asts: Park H. 5		Pts: Li M. 20; Rebs: Han 8 Asts: Yang 6

Aleksandar Nikolić Hall, Belgrade
Referees: Grant Todey (USA), Julio Anaya (PAN), Özlem Yalman (TUR)

9 February 2020
14:30

Boxscore

Great Britain	69–79	Spain
Scoring by quarter: 16–18, 14–22, 19–20, 20–19
Pts: Fagbenle 21; Rebs: Leedham 12; Asts: Leedham 6		Pts: Conde 15; Rebs: Gil 7 Asts: Palau 8

Aleksandar Nikolić Hall, Belgrade
Referees: Rabah Noujaim (LIB), Andrei Sharapa (BLR), Arnaud Kom Njilo (CMR)

== Statistics and awards ==
=== Statistical leaders ===
Players

Points

Name	PPG
(United Kingdom) Temi Fagbenle	25.0
(United Kingdom) Johannah Leedham	18.3
(China) Li Meng	16.3
(China) Han Xu	13.3
(South Korea) Kang A-jeong	12.0
(South Korea) Park Hye-jin	12.0

Rebounds

Name	RPG
(China) Li Yueru	8.0
(United Kingdom) Johannah Leedham	7.7
(Spain) Laura Nicholls	7.3
(China) Han Xu	6.3
(South Korea) Kim Han-byul	6.0

Assists

Name	APG
(United Kingdom) Johannah Leedham	7.3
(Spain) Laia Palau	6.3
(South Korea) Park Hye-jin	4.7
(United Kingdom) Temi Fagbenle	4.3
(China) Li Meng	4.0
(China) Shao Ting	4.0

Blocks

Name	BPG
(China) Han Xu	2.0
(South Korea) Park Ji-su	2.0
(Spain) Laura Nicholls	1.3
(South Korea) Kim Dan-bi	1.0
(Spain) María Conde	1.0

Steals

Name	SPG
(United Kingdom) Temi Fagbenle	2.3
(Spain) Cristina Ouviña	2.3
(Spain) Alba Torrens	2.3
(United Kingdom) Johannah Leedham	2.0
(Spain) Laura Gil	2.0
(Spain) Laia Palau	2.0

Teams

Points

Team	PPG
China	83.3
Great Britain	74.7
Spain	74.7
South Korea	62.7

Rebounds

Name	RPG
China	44.3
Spain	38.0
Great Britain	30.0
South Korea	27.7

Assists

Name	APG
Spain	23.0
China	21.7
Great Britain	20.7
South Korea	18.0

Blocks

Name	BPG
Spain	5.0
South Korea	4.0
China	3.3
Great Britain	1.7

Steals

Name	SPG
Spain	12.0
Great Britain	8.0
China	6.3
South Korea	4.0

=== Awards ===
The all star-teams and MVP were announced on 9 February 2020.

All-Star Team
Guards	Forwards	Center
(South Korea) Park Hye-jin (China) Li Meng	(Spain) Alba Torrens (United Kingdom) Temi Fagbenle	(China) Han Xu
MVP: (China) Li Meng
