= 2026 FIBA Women's Basketball World Cup Pre-Qualifying Tournaments =

Tournament details
- Host countries: Mexico; Rwanda
- Cities: Mexico City; Kigali
- Dates: 19–25 August 2024
- Teams: 16 (from 4 confederations)
- Venues: 2 (in 2 host cities)

The 2026 FIBA Women's Basketball World Cup Pre-Qualifying Tournaments were held from 19 to 25 August 2024 in Mexico City, Mexico and Kigali, Rwanda. The winner of each tournament qualified for the 2026 FIBA Women's Basketball World Cup Qualifying Tournaments.

== Creation ==
On 2 February 2022, FIBA announced a new tournament that acted as pre qualifiers for the next Olympics or World Cup. It replaced the regional pre-qualifiers that started in 2019 and were created to give more opportunities for member associations to play more meaningful games.

== Format ==
16 teams (four per continent) participated in two tournaments, where the winning team advanced to the 2026 FIBA Women's Basketball World Cup Qualifying Tournaments. Originally, the 16 teams would play for only one spot in the global qualifiers. However, on 28 November 2023, FIBA decided to increase to spots from one to two.

== Teams ==
Teams qualified via their final ranking at the FIBA Continental Cups in 2023. Despite originally qualifying, Colombia (5th at the 2023 FIBA Women's AmeriCup) and Italy (9th at the EuroBasket Women 2023) did not enter. Mexico and Great Britain took the vacant spots.

Continent	Team(s)
Africa	Senegal ^{QT} Mali (3rd); Rwanda (4th); Mozambique (5th)
Americas	Brazil ^{QT} Venezuela (6th); Argentina (7th); Mexico (8th)
Asia/Oceania	New Zealand ^{QT} South Korea (5th); Philippines (6th); Lebanon (7th)
Europe	Hungary ^{QT} Czech Republic (7th); Montenegro (8th); Great Britain (10th)

- ^{QT} Participated in the 2024 FIBA Women's Olympic Qualifying Tournaments
- 4th, 5th, 6th: Position at the continental championship.

== Draw ==
The draw was held at 14:00 CET on 25 April 2024 at the FIBA headquarters in Mies, Switzerland. Rwandan Minister of Sports, Aurore Mimosa Munyangaju, helped perform the draw.

=== Seeding ===
The seeding was revealed on 24 April 2024. As hosts of the pre-qualifiers, Mexico and Rwanda were placed into pot 1.

Seed 1
Team	Pos
Mexico	45
Rwanda	74
Brazil	8
South Korea	13

Seed 2
Team	Pos
Hungary	16
Mali	20
Great Britain	21
Montenegro	22

Seed 3
Team	Pos
Czech Republic	23
Senegal	25
New Zealand	26
Argentina	31

Seed 4
Team	Pos
Mozambique	33
Venezuela	36
Philippines	40
Lebanon	51

Following the draw, the schedule was announced on 29 April 2024.

== Mexico City ==
2026 FIBA Women's Basketball World Cup Pre-Qualifying Tournaments – Mexico City

Tournament details
- Host country: Mexico
- City: Mexico City
- Dates: 19–25 August
- Teams: 8 (from 4 confederations)
- Venue: 1 (in 1 host city)

Final positions
- Champions: Czech Republic
- Runners-up: South Korea
- Third place: Montenegro
- Fourth place: Mexico

Tournament statistics
- Games played: 15
- Attendance: 6,892 (459 per game)
- MVP: (Czech Republic) Julia Reisingerová
- Top scorer: (Mexico) Gabriela Jaquez (21.8 ppg)

Official website
- Official website

=== Venue ===
The Gimnasio Olímpico Juan de la Barrera in Mexico City hosted the competition.

2026 FIBA Women's Basketball World Cup Pre-Qualifying Tournaments is located in Mexico	Mexico City
2026 FIBA Women's Basketball World Cup Pre-Qualifying Tournaments is located in Mexico	Gimnasio Olímpico Juan de la Barrera
2026 FIBA Women's Basketball World Cup Pre-Qualifying Tournaments is located in Mexico	Capacity: 5,242

=== Preliminary round ===
All times are local (UTC−6).

==== Group A ====
Pos	Team	Pld	W	L	PF	PA	PD	Pts	Qualification
1	Czech Republic	3	3	0	246	175	+71	6	Semifinals
2	South Korea	3	1	2	228	223	+5	4 (Note: Head-to-head point difference: South Korea +18, Mali −2, Venezuela −16.)	Semifinals
3	Mali	3	1	2	214	237	−23	4	
4	Venezuela	3	1	2	199	252	−53	4	

Source: FIBA
Rules for classification: 1) points; 2) head-to-head points; 3) head-to-head points difference; 4) head-to-head number of points scored.
Notes:

19 August 2024
12:00

Boxscore

South Korea	78–84	Venezuela
Scoring by quarter: 21–23, 24–18, 17–19, 16–24
Pts: Park Ji-h. 19; Rebs: Park Ji-h., Park Ji-s. 6 Asts: Heo 4		Pts: Pérez 22; Rebs: Herlihy 9 Asts: Durán 7

Gimnasio Olímpico Juan de la Barrera, Mexico City
Attendance: 40
Referees: Orlando Varela (HON), Ahmed Al-Shuwaili (IRQ), Kumiko Kumagai (JPN)

19 August 2024
14:30

Boxscore

Mali	63–84	Czech Republic
Scoring by quarter: 13–25, 22–23, 20–17, 8–19
Pts: Dembelé 18; Rebs: Haidara, Theinou 5 Asts: Sanou 4		Pts: Reisingerová 21; Rebs: Čechová, Stoupalová 9 Asts: Šotolová 5

Gimnasio Olímpico Juan de la Barrera, Mexico City
Attendance: 50
Referees: Alan dos Santos (BRA), Yasmina Alcaraz (ESP), Jacquiline Dover (AUS)

20 August 2024
17:30

Boxscore

Czech Republic	76–63	South Korea
Scoring by quarter: 24–17, 14–14, 22–18, 16–14
Pts: Čechová 15; Rebs: Pospíšilová, Reisingerová 6 Asts: Hamzová 6		Pts: Park Ji-s. 20; Rebs: Park Ji-s. 7 Asts: Heo 4

Gimnasio Olímpico Juan de la Barrera, Mexico City
Attendance: 50
Referees: Orlando Varela (HON), Micaela Prado (ARG), Amal Dahra (FRA)

20 August 2024
20:30

Boxscore

Venezuela	66–88	Mali
Scoring by quarter: 15–25, 9–25, 29–15, 13–23
Pts: Wallen 21; Rebs: Pérez 9 Asts: Pérez 5		Pts: N'Diaye 21; Rebs: three players 8 Asts: Sissoko 5

Gimnasio Olímpico Juan de la Barrera, Mexico City
Attendance: 125
Referees: Carsten Straube (GER), Yezid Carreño (COL), Silvia Marziali (ITA)

22 August 2024
12:00

Boxscore

South Korea	87–63	Mali
Scoring by quarter: 18–16, 22–19, 17–10, 30–18
Pts: Kang Lee-s. 26; Rebs: Park Ji-s. 12; Asts: Shin 8		Pts: N'Diaye 18; Rebs: Haidara 9 Asts: Theinou, Sissoko 3

Gimnasio Olímpico Juan de la Barrera, Mexico City
Attendance: 30
Referees: Orlando Varela (HON), Silvia Marziali (ITA), Franco Ronconi (ARG)

22 August 2024
14:30

Boxscore

Czech Republic	86–49	Venezuela
Scoring by quarter: 30–19, 17–6, 20–10, 19–14
Pts: three players 12; Rebs: Čechová 9 Asts: Hamzová, Sklenářová 4		Pts: Fajardo 13; Rebs: Herlihy 9 Asts: three players 2

Gimnasio Olímpico Juan de la Barrera, Mexico City
Attendance: 128
Referees: Ahmed Al-Shuwaili (IRQ), Ryan Johnson (USA), Kumiko Kumagai (JPN)

==== Group B ====
Pos	Team	Pld	W	L	PF	PA	PD	Pts	Qualification
1	Montenegro	3	3	0	236	187	+49	6	Semifinals
2	Mexico (H)	3	2	1	213	203	+10	5	Semifinals
3	New Zealand	3	1	2	207	222	−15	4	
4	Mozambique	3	0	3	180	224	−44	3	

Source: FIBA
Rules for classification: 1) points; 2) head-to-head points; 3) head-to-head points difference; 4) head-to-head number of points scored.
(H) Hosts

19 August 2024
17:30

Boxscore

Montenegro	88–64	New Zealand
Scoring by quarter: 16–14, 21–18, 29–15, 22–17
Pts: Kovačević 18; Rebs: Kovačević 7 Asts: Živković 6		Pts: Davidson, Tamilo 11; Rebs: Tamilo 6 Asts: Hokianga 5

Gimnasio Olímpico Juan de la Barrera, Mexico City
Attendance: 50
Referees: Carsten Straube (GER), Ryan Johnson (USA), Xiang Fei (CHN)

19 August 2024
21:00

Boxscore

Mexico	71–65	Mozambique
Scoring by quarter: 14–14, 9–19, 20–19, 28–13
Pts: Jaquez 19; Rebs: Payán 10; Asts: Ramírez 6		Pts: Sumbane 16; Rebs: Mucauro 10; Asts: Sumbane, Zita 3

Gimnasio Olímpico Juan de la Barrera, Mexico City
Attendance: 500
Referees: Franco Ronconi (ARG), Aline García (URU), Sandra Sánchez (ESP)

21 August 2024
17:30

Boxscore

Mozambique	52–74	Montenegro
Scoring by quarter: 10–20, 9–15, 12–21, 21–18
Pts: Mucauro 13; Rebs: Mafanela 7 Asts: Mucauro 3		Pts: Jovanović 20; Rebs: Bigović 7 Asts: Leković 8

Gimnasio Olímpico Juan de la Barrera, Mexico City
Attendance: 67
Referees: Alan dos Santos (BRA), Sandra Sánchez (ESP), Xiang Fei (CHN)

21 August 2024
20:30

Boxscore

New Zealand	64–71	Mexico
Scoring by quarter: 14–20, 26–9, 11–15, 13–27
Pts: Reed 14; Rebs: Tamilo 8 Asts: Davidson 4		Pts: Jaquez 22; Rebs: Lara 13; Asts: Ramos 5

Gimnasio Olímpico Juan de la Barrera, Mexico City
Attendance: 1,000
Referees: Ahmed Al-Shuwaili (IRQ), Ryan Johnson (USA), Kumiko Kumagai (JPN)

22 August 2024
17:30

Boxscore

New Zealand	79–63	Mozambique
Scoring by quarter: 14–12, 30–18, 20–20, 15–13
Pts: Whittaker 27; Rebs: McGoldrick 18; Asts: Tamilo 5		Pts: Mucauro 14; Rebs: Mucauro, Zita 4 Asts: Pinto, Zita 4

Gimnasio Olímpico Juan de la Barrera, Mexico City
Attendance: 100
Referees: Alan dos Santos (BRA), Yasmina Alcaraz (ESP), Jacquiline Dover (AUS)

22 August 2024
20:30

Boxscore

Mexico	71–74 (OT)	Montenegro
Scoring by quarter: 7–16, 18–11, 19–19, 18–16, Overtime: 9–12
Pts: Jaquez 26; Rebs: Jaquez, Martínez 8 Asts: Ramos 4		Pts: Jovanović 29; Rebs: Živković 10; Asts: Jovanović, Leković 5

Gimnasio Olímpico Juan de la Barrera, Mexico City
Attendance: 1,250
Referees: Carsten Straube (GER), Aline García (URU), Sandra Sánchez (ESP)

=== Knockout stage ===
==== Bracket ====
Semi-finals
24 August
Mexico	72
Czech Republic	82
24 August
Montenegro	66
South Korea	88

Final
25 August
Czech Republic	73
South Korea	67

==== Semifinals ====
24 August 2024
14:30

Boxscore

Montenegro	66–88	South Korea
Scoring by quarter: 13–25, 18–27, 14–16, 21–20
Pts: Leković 17; Rebs: Bigović 10; Asts: Jovanović, Živković 4		Pts: Lee So-h. 23; Rebs: Park Ji-h. 10; Asts: Park Ji-h. 5

Gimnasio Olímpico Juan de la Barrera, Mexico City
Attendance: 546
Referees: Alan dos Santos (BRA), Yasmina Alcaraz (ESP), Kumiko Kumagai (JPN)

24 August 2024
17:00

Boxscore

Mexico	72–82	Czech Republic
Scoring by quarter: 18–19, 17–13, 14–30, 23–20
Pts: Jaquez 20; Rebs: Jaquez 7 Asts: Ramírez 4		Pts: Vyoralová 20; Rebs: Reisingerová 8 Asts: Vyoralová 4

Gimnasio Olímpico Juan de la Barrera, Mexico City
Attendance: 2,000
Referees: Orlando Varela (HON), Ryan Johnson (USA), Silvia Marziali (ITA)

==== Final ====
25 August 2024
17:00

Boxscore

Czech Republic	73–67	South Korea
Scoring by quarter: 10–7, 21–19, 16–25, 26–16
Pts: Andělová, Stoupalová 15; Rebs: Stoupalová 7 Asts: Reisingerová 6		Pts: Park Ji-s. 22; Rebs: Lee So-h. 8 Asts: Park Ji-h., Shin 7

Gimnasio Olímpico Juan de la Barrera, Mexico City
Attendance: 956
Referees: Orlando Varela (HON), Alan dos Santos (BRA), Sandra Sánchez (ESP)

=== Final ranking ===
#	Team	W–L	Qualification
1	Czech Republic	5–0	Qualified for the World Cup Qualifying Tournaments
2	South Korea	2–3	
3	Montenegro	3–1	
4	Mexico	2–2	
5	New Zealand	1–2	
6	Mali	1–2	
7	Venezuela	1–2	
8	Mozambique	0–3	

=== Statistical leaders ===
==== Players ====
Points

Player	PPG
(Mexico) Gabriela Jaquez	21.8
(Mali) Djeneba N'Diaye	18.0
(Montenegro) Milica Jovanović	17.5
(South Korea) Kang Lee-seul	17.0
(South Korea) Park Ji-su	16.8

Rebounds

Player	RPG
(New Zealand) Esra McGoldrick	9.3
(Venezuela) Brianna Herlihy	9.0
(New Zealand) Ritorya Tamilo	8.7
(South Korea) Park Ji-su	7.8
(Mexico) Gabriela Jaquez	7.8

Assists

Player	APG
(Montenegro) Marija Leković	6.0
(Venezuela) Mariana Durán	5.3
(South Korea) Park Ji-hyun	4.8
(South Korea) Shin Ji-hyun	4.4
(Mexico) Hazel Ramírez	4.3
(Mozambique) Delma Zita	4.3

Blocks

Player	BPG
(South Korea) Park Ji-su	2.0
(New Zealand) Ritorya Tamilo	1.3
(Montenegro) Maja Bigović	1.3
(Mozambique) Célia Sumbane	1.3
(Czech Republic) Emma Čechová	1.0

Steals

Player	SPG
(Mozambique) Célia Sumbane	3.7
(Mozambique) Ingvild Mucauro	3.7
(Mali) Fatoumata Sanou	2.7
(Venezuela) Waleska Pérez	2.3
(Mali) Sira Theinou	2.3
(Mali) Maimouna Haidara	2.3

Efficiency

Player	EFFPG
(South Korea) Park Ji-hyun	19.2
(South Korea) Park Ji-su	19.0
(Mexico) Gabriela Jaquez	18.8
(Venezuela) Daniela Wallen	18.3
(Montenegro) Milica Jovanović	18.0

==== Teams ====
Points

Team	PPG
Czech Republic	80.2
South Korea	76.6
Montenegro	75.5
Mali	71.3
Mexico	71.3

Rebounds

Team	RPG
New Zealand	51.7
Mali	46.3
Czech Republic	44.2
Mexico	42.3
Montenegro	41.5

Assists

Team	APG
South Korea	24.2
Czech Republic	23.8
Montenegro	20.5
New Zealand	19.0
Venezuela	18.0

Blocks

Team	BPG
Czech Republic	4.2
New Zealand	3.3
Venezuela	3.0
Mexico	3.0
South Korea	2.4

Steals

Team	SPG
Mali	11.7
Mozambique	11.3
Mexico	9.0
Montenegro	8.8
South Korea	8.2

Efficiency

Team	EFFPG
Czech Republic	99.6
South Korea	90.4
Montenegro	84.5
New Zealand	75.0
Mexico	71.8

=== Awards ===
The awards were announced on 26 August 2024.

All-Star Five
Guards	Forwards	Centers
(Czech Republic) Tereza Vyoralová	(Mexico) Gabriela Jaquez (Montenegro) Milica Jovanović	(Czech Republic) Julia Reisingerová (South Korea) Park Ji-su
MVP: (Czech Republic) Julia Reisingerová

== Kigali ==
2026 FIBA Women's Basketball World Cup Pre-Qualifying Tournaments – Kigali

Tournament details
- Host country: Rwanda
- City: Kigali
- Dates: 19–25 August
- Teams: 8 (from 4 confederations)
- Venue: 1 (in 1 host city)

Final positions
- Champions: Hungary
- Runners-up: Senegal
- Third place: Great Britain
- Fourth place: Rwanda

Tournament statistics
- Games played: 15
- Attendance: 47,383 (3,159 per game)
- MVP: (Hungary) Réka Lelik
- Top scorer: (Brazil) Emanuely de Oliveira (17.7 ppg)

Official website
- Official website

=== Venue ===
The BK Arena in Kigali hosted the competition.

2026 FIBA Women's Basketball World Cup Pre-Qualifying Tournaments is located in Rwanda	Kigali
2026 FIBA Women's Basketball World Cup Pre-Qualifying Tournaments is located in Rwanda	BK Arena
2026 FIBA Women's Basketball World Cup Pre-Qualifying Tournaments is located in Rwanda	Capacity: 10,000

=== Preliminary round ===
All times are local (UTC+2).

==== Group C ====
Pos	Team	Pld	W	L	PF	PA	PD	Pts	Qualification
1	Senegal	3	3	0	219	182	+37	6	Semifinals
2	Hungary	3	2	1	245	189	+56	5	Semifinals
3	Brazil	3	1	2	202	230	−28	4	
4	Philippines	3	0	3	196	261	−65	3	

Source: FIBA
Rules for classification: 1) points; 2) head-to-head points; 3) head-to-head points difference; 4) head-to-head number of points scored.

19 August 2024
11:00

Boxscore

Hungary	61–63	Senegal
Scoring by quarter: 16–20, 14–17, 12–7, 19–19
Pts: Dubei 24; Rebs: Kiss 5 Asts: Kányási 5		Pts: Kane 16; Rebs: Sene 8 Asts: Dillard 6

BK Arena, Kigali
Attendance: 150
Referees: Nicolas Fernandes (AUS), Yann Davidson (MAD), Kim Bo-hui (KOR)

19 August 2024
14:00

Boxscore

Brazil	77–74	Philippines
Scoring by quarter: 20–15, 20–24, 20–18, 17–17
Pts: Soares 15; Rebs: Moura 13; Asts: Martins 8		Pts: Animam 18; Rebs: Animam 21; Asts: Panganiban 4

BK Arena, Kigali
Attendance: 57
Referees: Christine Vuong (CAN), Juozas Barkauskas (LTU), Sara El-Sharnouby (EGY)

20 August 2024
17:00

Boxscore

Philippines	60–97	Hungary
Scoring by quarter: 14–23, 10–28, 20–24, 16–22
Pts: Bernardino 11; Rebs: Bernardino 6 Asts: Pontejos 4		Pts: Török 25; Rebs: three players 9 Asts: Angyal 5

BK Arena, Kigali
Attendance: 500
Referees: Fernando Calatrava (ESP), Julirys Guzmán (PUR), Monicca Nassuuna (UGA)

20 August 2024
20:00

Boxscore

Senegal	69–59	Brazil
Scoring by quarter: 14–21, 21–15, 16–11, 18–12
Pts: Dillard 19; Rebs: Kane 11; Asts: Dillard 7		Pts: De Oliveira 19; Rebs: Moura 8 Asts: Martins 4

BK Arena, Kigali
Attendance: 502
Referees: Can Mavisu (TUR), Yann Davidson (MAD), Dorothy Okatch (BOT)

22 August 2024
11:00

Boxscore

Senegal	87–62	Philippines
Scoring by quarter: 22–20, 23–12, 19–11, 23–19
Pts: Kane 21; Rebs: Ndiaye 11; Asts: Dillard 6		Pts: Animam 15; Rebs: Bernardino 9 Asts: Berberabe 7

BK Arena, Kigali
Attendance: 350
Referees: Nicolas Fernandes (AUS), Arnold Moseya (RSA), Joyce Muchenu (ZIM)

22 August 2024
14:00

Boxscore

Brazil	66–87	Hungary
Scoring by quarter: 9–15, 14–25, 23–26, 20–21
Pts: De Oliveira 21; Rebs: three players 5 Asts: Martins 4		Pts: Kiss 22; Rebs: Kiss 7 Asts: Studer 6

BK Arena, Kigali
Attendance: 498
Referees: Can Mavisu (TUR), Christine Vuong (CAN), Julirys Guzmán (PUR)

==== Group D ====
Pos	Team	Pld	W	L	PF	PA	PD	Pts	Qualification
1	Great Britain	3	2	1	199	186	+13	5 (Note: Head-to-head point difference: Great Britain +8, Rwanda +6, Argentina −14.)	Semifinals
2	Rwanda (H)	3	2	1	199	175	+24	5	Semifinals
3	Argentina	3	2	1	151	154	−3	5	
4	Lebanon	3	0	3	183	217	−34	3	

Source: FIBA
Rules for classification: 1) points; 2) head-to-head points; 3) head-to-head points difference; 4) head-to-head number of points scored.
(H) Hosts
Notes:

19 August 2024
17:00

Boxscore

Great Britain	47–53	Argentina
Scoring by quarter: 7–19, 15–10, 13–14, 12–10
Pts: Winterburn 11; Rebs: Ashby, Wilkinson 9 Asts: three players 3		Pts: D'Urso 19; Rebs: Burani 11; Asts: Gretter 6

BK Arena, Kigali
Attendance: 1,500
Referees: Fernando Calatrava (ESP), Joyce Muchenu (ZIM), Paulina Gajdosz (POL)

19 August 2024
20:00

Boxscore

Rwanda	80–62	Lebanon
Scoring by quarter: 24–17, 21–19, 20–12, 15–14
Pts: Murekatete 24; Rebs: Murekatete, Uwizeye 7 Asts: Philoxy 12		Pts: Mansour 18; Rebs: three players 5 Asts: Akl, Mansour 3

BK Arena, Kigali
Attendance: 3,802
Referees: Can Mavisu (TUR), Arnold Moseya (RSA), Julirys Guzmán (PUR)

21 August 2024
17:00

Boxscore

Lebanon	72–77	Great Britain
Scoring by quarter: 16–13, 11–19, 11–18, 34–27
Pts: Baptiste 24; Rebs: Baptiste 7 Asts: Akl 9		Pts: Wilkinson 16; Rebs: Ashby, Winterburn 9 Asts: Winterburn 11

BK Arena, Kigali
Attendance: 8,000
Referees: Christine Vuong (CAN), Juozas Barkauskas (LTU), Haytham Ihaqaf (IRQ)

21 August 2024
20:00

Boxscore

Argentina	38–58	Rwanda
Scoring by quarter: 13–20, 9–7, 7–18, 9–13
Pts: Chagas 9 Rebs: Burani, Gentinetta 8 Asts: Gretter 4		Pts: Murekatete 18; Rebs: Murekatete 18; Asts: Philoxy 8

BK Arena, Kigali
Attendance: 5,500
Referees: Nicolas Fernandes (AUS), Arnold Moseya (RSA), Nadege Zouzou (CIV)

22 August 2024
17:00

Boxscore

Argentina	60–49	Lebanon
Scoring by quarter: 14–14, 13–10, 22–11, 11–14
Pts: Burani 23; Rebs: Burani 13; Asts: Gretter 7		Pts: Baptiste 16; Rebs: Baptiste 10; Asts: Akl 3

BK Arena, Kigali
Attendance: 5,000
Referees: Fernando Calatrava (ESP), Juozas Barkauskas (LTU), Dorothy Okatch (BOT)

22 August 2024
20:00

Boxscore

Rwanda	61–75	Great Britain
Scoring by quarter: 10–16, 13–29, 16–22, 22–8
Pts: Murekatete 17; Rebs: Murekatete 9 Asts: Philoxy 5		Pts: Winterburn 15; Rebs: three players 7 Asts: Winterburn 6

BK Arena, Kigali
Attendance: 7,000
Referees: Yann Davidson (MAD), Sara El-Sharnouby (EGY), Paulina Gajdosz (POL)

=== Knockout stage ===
==== Bracket ====
Semi-finals
24 August
Rwanda	65
Senegal	68
24 August
Great Britain	59
Hungary	82

Final
25 August
Senegal	47
Hungary	63

==== Semifinals ====
24 August 2024
17:00

Boxscore

Great Britain	59–82	Hungary
Scoring by quarter: 15–23, 16–22, 14–18, 14–19
Pts: Wilkinson 14; Rebs: Wilkinson 8 Asts: Winterburn 8		Pts: Kiss 17; Rebs: Határ, Kiss 6 Asts: Lelik 8

BK Arena, Kigali
Attendance: 3,500
Referees: Nicolas Fernandes (AUS), Arnold Moseya (RSA), Juozas Barkauskas (LTU)

24 August 2024
20:00

Boxscore

Rwanda	65–68	Senegal
Scoring by quarter: 23–15, 15–16, 12–25, 15–12
Pts: Sifa 21; Rebs: Murekatete 9 Asts: Philoxy 5		Pts: Y. Diop 15; Rebs: Dillard, Sene 7 Asts: Dillard, Fall 4

BK Arena, Kigali
Attendance: 7,203
Referees: Can Mavisu (TUR), Yann Davidson (MAD), Christine Vuong (CAN)

==== Final ====
25 August 2024
17:00

Boxscore

Senegal	47–63	Hungary
Scoring by quarter: 12–13, 14–20, 8–16, 13–14
Pts: Kane 18; Rebs: Pouye 7 Asts: Dillard 6		Pts: Kiss 17; Rebs: Határ 9 Asts: Lelik 5

BK Arena, Kigali
Attendance: 4,001
Referees: Yann Davidson (MAD), Nicolas Fernandes (AUS), Paulina Gajdosz (POL)

=== Final ranking ===
#	Team	W–L	Qualification
1	Hungary	4–1	Qualified for the World Cup Qualifying Tournaments
2	Senegal	4–1	
3	Great Britain	2–2	
4	Rwanda	2–2	
5	Argentina	2–1	
6	Brazil	1–2	
7	Lebanon	0–3	
8	Philippines	0–3	

=== Statistical leaders ===
==== Players ====
Points

Player	PPG
(Brazil) Emanuely de Oliveira	17.7
(Rwanda) Bella Murekatete	17.5
(Lebanon) Trinity Baptiste	17.0
(Senegal) Ndioma Kane	16.6
(Rwanda) Ineza Sifa	14.3
(Lebanon) Rebecca Akl	14.3

Rebounds

Player	RPG
(Rwanda) Bella Murekatete	11.0
(Argentina) Agostina Burani	10.7
(Philippines) Jack Animam	9.3
(Brazil) Aline Moura	8.3
(United Kingdom) Savannah Wilkinson	7.5

Assists

Player	APG
(Rwanda) Destiney Philoxy	7.3
(United Kingdom) Holly Winterburn	7.0
(Argentina) Melisa Gretter	5.7
(Lebanon) Rebecca Akl	5.7
(Senegal) Cierra Dillard	5.6

Blocks

Player	BPG
(Senegal) Ndioma Kane	2.2
(Philippines) Jack Animam	2.0
(Philippines) Quinn Dela Rosa	1.3
(Argentina) Agostina Burani	1.3
(Rwanda) Bella Murekatete	1.3

Steals

Player	SPG
(Philippines) Afril Bernardino	3.0
(Senegal) Cierra Dillard	2.8
(Senegal) Ndioma Kane	2.6
(Argentina) Melisa Gretter	2.0
(United Kingdom) Hannah Robb	1.8
(Rwanda) Ineza Sifa	1.8

Efficiency

Player	EFFPG
(Rwanda) Bella Murekatete	22.0
(Senegal) Ndioma Kane	21.4
(Argentina) Agostina Burani	18.0
(Philippines) Jack Animam	17.0
(Hungary) Réka Lelik	16.8

==== Teams ====
Points

Team	PPG
Hungary	78.0
Brazil	67.3
Senegal	66.8
Rwanda	66.0
Philippines	65.3

Rebounds

Team	RPG
Senegal	47.4
Argentina	46.3
Brazil	44.0
Rwanda	42.3
Great Britain	42.3

Assists

Team	APG
Hungary	25.0
Brazil	18.0
Great Britain	17.3
Senegal	16.8
Argentina	16.7

Blocks

Team	BPG
Philippines	4.0
Senegal	3.6
Hungary	3.0
Brazil	2.7
Argentina	2.7

Steals

Team	SPG
Senegal	11.2
Philippines	10.3
Rwanda	7.8
Hungary	7.6
Argentina	7.3

Efficiency

Team	EFFPG
Hungary	96.8
Senegal	72.4
Rwanda	69.0
Great Britain	65.3
Brazil	63.0

=== Awards ===
The awards were announced on 26 August 2024.

All-Star Five
Guards	Forwards	Centers
(Hungary) Réka Lelik (United Kingdom) Holly Winterburn	(Senegal) Ndioma Kane	(Hungary) Virág Kiss (Rwanda) Bella Murekatete
MVP: (Hungary) Réka Lelik
