= EuroBasket Women 2019 Group B =

Group B of the EuroBasket Women 2019 took place between 27 and 30 June 2019. The group consisted of Czech Republic, France, Montenegro and Sweden and played all games at Riga, Latvia.

== Standings ==
Pos	Team	Pld	W	L	PF	PA	PD	Pts	Qualification
1	France	3	3	0	233	179	+54	6	Quarterfinals
2	Sweden	3	1	2	196	193	+3	4 (Note: Sweden 3 Pts, +9 PD; Montenegro 3 Pts, −3 PD; Czech Republic 3 Pts, −6 PD)	Qualification for quarterfinals
3	Montenegro	3	1	2	174	212	−38	4	Qualification for quarterfinals
4	Czech Republic	3	1	2	189	208	−19	4	

Source: FIBA
Rules for classification: 1) Points; 2) Head-to-head results; 3) Points difference; 4) Points scored.
Notes:

All times are local (UTC+3).

== Matches ==
=== Sweden vs Montenegro ===
27 June 2019
13:00

Boxscore

Sweden	67–51	Montenegro
Scoring by quarter: 23–8, 8–15, 18–10, 18–18
Pts: Zahui 21; Rebs: Zahui 12; Asts: E. Eldebrink 4		Pts: Johnson 15; Rebs: Johnson 9 Asts: Mujović 6

Arēna Rīga, Riga
Attendance: 693
Referees: Özlem Yalman (TUR), Amy Bonner (USA), Beniamino Attard (ITA)

=== France vs Czech Republic ===
27 June 2019
15:30

Boxscore

France	74–61	Czech Republic
Scoring by quarter: 19–20, 9–15, 22–15, 24–11
Pts: Époupa 18; Rebs: Gruda, Miyem 8 Asts: Époupa 6		Pts: Hejdová 19; Rebs: Březinová 6 Asts: Bartáková, Vyoralová 4

Arēna Rīga, Riga
Attendance: 450
Referees: Andrei Sharapa (BLR), Jelena Tomić (CRO), Mila Čavara (BIH)

=== Czech Republic vs Sweden ===
28 June 2019
13:00

Boxscore

Czech Republic	71–64	Sweden
Scoring by quarter: 14–14, 16–30, 22–9, 19–11
Pts: Březinová 23; Rebs: Štěpánová 7 Asts: Bartáková, Vyoralová 5		Pts: Zahui 19; Rebs: Zahui 7 Asts: Zahui 5

Arēna Rīga, Riga
Attendance: 690
Referees: Jasmina Juras (SRB), Jelena Tomić (CRO), Andrei Sharapa (BLR)

=== Montenegro vs France ===
28 June 2019
15:30

Boxscore

Montenegro	53–88	France
Scoring by quarter: 13–24, 12–22, 13–21, 15–21
Pts: Mujović 12; Rebs: three players 5 Asts: Aleksić 3		Pts: Johannès 15; Rebs: Ayayi 7 Asts: Époupa 6

Arēna Rīga, Riga
Attendance: 250
Referees: Özlem Yalman (TUR), Amy Bonner (USA), Tamás Földházi (HUN)

=== Czech Republic vs Montenegro ===
30 June 2019
15:30

Boxscore

Czech Republic	57–70	Montenegro
Scoring by quarter: 11–20, 13–19, 14–12, 19–19
Pts: Hejdová 16; Rebs: Hejdová 9 Asts: Štěpánová, Vyoralová 4		Pts: Johnson 27; Rebs: Johnson, Jovanović 14; Asts: Mujović 9

Arēna Rīga, Riga
Attendance: 463
Referees: Maj Forsberg (DEN), Andrei Sharapa (BLR), Elena Chernova (RUS)

=== Sweden vs France ===
30 June 2019
21:00

Boxscore

Sweden	65–71	France
Scoring by quarter: 9–17, 16–18, 16–16, 24–20
Pts: E. Eldebrink 18; Rebs: Zahui 14; Asts: F. Eldebrink 5		Pts: Gruda 16; Rebs: Époupa 7 Asts: Époupa 7

Arēna Rīga, Riga
Attendance: 705
Referees: Özlem Yalman (TUR), Blaž Zupančič (SLO), Viola Györgyi (NOR)
