= EuroBasket Women 2019 Group C =

Group C of the EuroBasket Women 2019 took place between 27 and 30 June 2019. The group consisted of Hungary, Italy, Slovenia and Turkey and played all of its games at Niš, Serbia.

== Standings ==
Pos	Team	Pld	W	L	PF	PA	PD	Pts	Qualification
1	Hungary	3	2	1	205	194	+11	5 (Note: Italy 51–59 Hungary)	Quarterfinals
2	Italy	3	2	1	183	170	+13	5	Qualification for quarterfinals
3	Slovenia	3	1	2	203	218	−15	4 (Note: Slovenia 62–55 Turkey)	Qualification for quarterfinals
4	Turkey	3	1	2	168	177	−9	4	

Source: FIBA
Rules for classification: 1) Points; 2) Head-to-head results; 3) Points difference; 4) Points scored.
Notes:

All times are local (UTC+2).

== Matches ==
=== Hungary vs Slovenia ===
27 June 2019
16:00

Boxscore

Hungary	88–84	Slovenia
Scoring by quarter: 22–25, 14–14, 23–30, 29–15
Pts: Turner 23; Rebs: Határ 11; Asts: Turner 6		Pts: Oblak 21; Rebs: Lisec 8 Asts: Barič 10

Čair Sports Center, Niš
Attendance: 420
Referees: Marius Ciulin (ROU), Andrada Csender (ROU), Esperanza Mendoza (ESP)

=== Turkey vs Italy ===
27 June 2019
18:30

Boxscore

Turkey	54–57	Italy
Scoring by quarter: 17–10, 8–16, 12–10, 17–21
Pts: Çakır 13; Rebs: Stokes 8 Asts: Köksal 4		Pts: Sottana 16; Rebs: Cubaj 7 Asts: Zandalasini 5

Čair Sports Center, Niš
Attendance: 312
Referees: Mārtiņš Koslovskis (LAT), Radomir Vojinović (MNE), Ivor Matějek (CZE)

=== Slovenia vs Turkey ===
28 June 2019
16:00

Boxscore

Slovenia	62–55	Turkey
Scoring by quarter: 14–14, 16–15, 16–18, 16–8
Pts: Oblak 18; Rebs: Frišcovec 7 Asts: Barič 12		Pts: Stokes 17; Rebs: Stokes 19; Asts: Canitez 4

Čair Sports Center, Niš
Attendance: 500
Referees: Marius Ciulin (ROU), Mārtiņš Koslovskis (LAT), Ivor Matějek (CZE)

=== Italy vs Hungary ===
28 June 2019
18:30

Boxscore

Italy	51–59	Hungary
Scoring by quarter: 11–18, 15–7, 7–14, 18–20
Pts: Sottana 16; Rebs: Cubaj 10; Asts: Sottana 4		Pts: Horti 13; Rebs: Turner 11; Asts: Varga 3

Čair Sports Center, Niš
Attendance: 388
Referees: Radomir Vojinović (MNE), Andrada Csender (ROU), Sergiy Chaykovskyy (UKR)

=== Hungary vs Turkey ===
30 June 2019
16:00

Boxscore

Hungary	58–59	Turkey
Scoring by quarter: 14–19, 12–8, 15–20, 17–12
Pts: Határ 15; Rebs: Határ 7 Asts: Dubei 4		Pts: Çakır, Stokes 11; Rebs: Stokes 5 Asts: Alben 7

Čair Sports Center, Niš
Attendance: 288
Referees: Radomir Vojinović (MNE), Andrada Csender (ROU), Esperanza Mendoza (ESP)

=== Italy vs Slovenia ===
30 June 2019
18:30

Boxscore

Italy	75–57	Slovenia
Scoring by quarter: 18–21, 18–11, 20–11, 19–14
Pts: Dotto 18; Rebs: Andrè 10; Asts: Zandalasini 5		Pts: Barič 15; Rebs: Evans 9 Asts: Prezelj 4

Čair Sports Center, Niš
Attendance: 550
Referees: Marius Ciulin (ROU), Mārtiņš Koslovskis (LAT), Sergiy Chaykovskyy (UKR)
