= EuroBasket Women 2019 Group D =

Group D of the EuroBasket Women 2019 took place between 27 and 30 June 2019. The group consisted of Serbia, Russia, Belarus and Belgium and played all its games at Zrenjanin, Serbia.

== Standings ==
Pos	Team	Pld	W	L	PF	PA	PD	Pts	Qualification
1	Serbia (H)	3	3	0	202	182	+20	6	Quarterfinals
2	Belgium	3	1	2	194	193	+1	4 (Note: Belgium 3 Pts, +5 PD; Russia 3 Pts, +1 PD; Belarus 3 Pts, −6 PD)	Qualification for quarterfinals
3	Russia	3	1	2	193	206	−13	4	Qualification for quarterfinals
4	Belarus	3	1	2	184	192	−8	4	

Source: FIBA
Rules for classification: 1) Points; 2) Head-to-head results; 3) Points difference; 4) Points scored.
(H) Hosts
Notes:

All times are local (UTC+2).

== Matches ==
=== Russia vs Belgium ===
27 June 2019
17:45

Boxscore

Russia	54–67	Belgium
Scoring by quarter: 19–16, 13–24, 15–13, 7–14
Pts: Vadeeva 20; Rebs: Vadeeva 11; Asts: Fedorenkova 4		Pts: Meesseman 29; Rebs: Meesseman 9 Asts: Allemand 6

Crystal Hall, Zrenjanin
Attendance: 365
Referees: Dariusz Zapolski (POL), Thomas Bissuel (FRA), Michał Proc (POL)

=== Belarus vs Serbia ===
27 June 2019
20:30

Boxscore

Belarus	53–55	Serbia
Scoring by quarter: 16–18, 16–11, 10–12, 11–14
Pts: Verameyenka 13; Rebs: Papova, Verameyenka 10; Asts: Bentley 4		Pts: Petrović 18; Rebs: Crvendakić, Petrović 6 Asts: Stanaćev 3

Crystal Hall, Zrenjanin
Attendance: 1,394
Referees: Vasiliki Tsaroucha (GRE), Gentian Cici (ALB), Zdenko Tomašovič (SVK)

=== Belgium vs Belarus ===
28 June 2019
17:45

Boxscore

Belgium	61–69	Belarus
Scoring by quarter: 19–21, 18–14, 15–18, 9–16
Pts: Meesseman 23; Rebs: Meesseman 9 Asts: Allemand 7		Pts: Bentley 19; Rebs: Papova 8 Asts: Tarasava 5

Crystal Hall, Zrenjanin
Attendance: 333
Referees: Vasiliki Tsaroucha (GRE), Chris Dodds (GBR), Thomas Bissuel (FRA)

=== Serbia vs Russia ===
28 June 2019
20:30

Boxscore

Serbia	77–63	Russia
Scoring by quarter: 23–16, 18–16, 12–21, 24–10
Pts: Dabović 16; Rebs: Dabović, Jovanović 7 Asts: Dabović 6		Pts: Shilova 11; Rebs: Musina 15; Asts: three players 2

Crystal Hall, Zrenjanin
Attendance: 1,705
Referees: Gentian Cici (ALB), Dariusz Zapolski (POL), Michał Proc (POL)

=== Belarus vs Russia ===
30 June 2019
17:45

Boxscore

Belarus	62–76	Russia
Scoring by quarter: 19–15, 8–18, 14–19, 21–24
Pts: Papova 15; Rebs: Likhtarovich 11; Asts: Bentley 4		Pts: Vadeeva 21; Rebs: Vadeeva 13; Asts: Belyakova 5

Crystal Hall, Zrenjanin
Attendance: 322
Referees: Dariusz Zapolski (POL), Michał Proc (POL), Chris Dodds (GBR)

=== Belgium vs Serbia ===
30 June 2019
20:30

Boxscore

Belgium	66–70	Serbia
Scoring by quarter: 15–16, 19–10, 14–16, 18–28
Pts: Meesseman 21; Rebs: Meesseman 9 Asts: Allemand, Meesseman 4		Pts: Brooks 16; Rebs: Crvendakić 11; Asts: Dabović 5

Crystal Hall, Zrenjanin
Attendance: 2,162
Referees: Vasiliki Tsaroucha (GRE), Gentian Cici (ALB), Zdenko Tomašovič (SVK)
