= EuroBasket Women 2019 =

2019 edition of EuroBasket Women

EuroBasket 2019 Women
37th FIBA European Women's Basketball Championship

Tournament details
- Host countries: Latvia; Serbia
- Dates: 27 June − 7 July
- Teams: 16
- Venue: 4 (in 4 host cities)

Final positions
- Champions: Spain (4th title)
- Runners-up: France
- Third place: Serbia
- Fourth place: Great Britain

Tournament statistics
- MVP: (Spain) Astou Ndour
- Top scorer: (United Kingdom) Fagbenle (20.9)
- Top rebounds: (Sweden) Zahui (9.3)
- Top assists: (Slovenia) Barič (8.5)
- PPG (Team): Spain (76.0)
- RPG (Team): Russia (45.0)
- APG (Team): France (20.0)

Official website
- Official website

The 2019 European Women Basketball Championship, commonly called EuroBasket Women 2019, was the 37th edition of the continental tournament in women's basketball, sanctioned by the FIBA Europe. The tournament was co-held in Riga, Latvia and Belgrade, Serbia from 27 June to 7 July 2019.

Spain won their second consecutive and fourth overall title after defeating France 86–66 in the final.

== Bidding process ==
The bids were as follows:

- Russia (Group phase and Final phase)
- Serbia (Group phase and Final phase)
- Latvia (Group phase)
- ~~Israel~~ (Group phase) (withdrew)

Shortly before the vote, Israel withdrew. Later in the day, on 24 June 2017, Serbia and Latvia won the hosting rights.

== Venues ==
(Serbia) Belgrade	(Serbia) Niš	EuroBasket Women 2019 is located in Europe
Štark Arena; Capacity: 18,386	Čair Sports Center; Capacity: 4,800	EuroBasket Women 2019 is located in Europe
(Serbia) Zrenjanin	(Latvia) Riga	EuroBasket Women 2019 is located in Europe
Crystal Hall; Capacity: 2,800	Arēna Rīga; Capacity: 11,200	EuroBasket Women 2019 is located in Europe

== Qualification ==
=== Qualified teams ===
Country	Qualified as	Date of qualification	Last appearance	Best placement in tournament	WR
Serbia	Host nation	24 June 2017	2017	Champions (2015)	8th
Latvia	Host nation	24 June 2017	2017	4th Place (2007)	24th
Turkey	Winners of Qualification Group B	17 November 2018	2017	Runner-up (2011)	6th
Russia	Winners of Qualification Group C	17 November 2018	2017	Champions (2003, 2007, 2011)	11th
Slovenia	Top 6 ranked of 2nd-placed teams in Qualification	17 November 2018	2017	14th Place (2007)	63rd
Spain	Winners of Qualification Group F	17 November 2018	2017	Champions (1993, 2013, 2017)	2nd
Czech Republic	Winners of Qualification Group G	17 November 2018	2017	Champions (2005)	12th
Belarus	Top 6 ranked of 2nd-placed teams in Qualification	21 November 2018	2017	3rd Place (2007)	13th
Montenegro	Winners of Qualification Group A	21 November 2018	2017	6th Place (2011)	26th
Great Britain	Winners of Qualification Group D	21 November 2018	2015	9th Place (2013, 2015)	25th
Belgium	Top 6 ranked of 2nd-placed teams in Qualification	21 November 2018	2017	3rd Place (2017)	16th
Italy	Winners of Qualification Group H	21 November 2018	2017	Champions (1938)	31st
France	Winners of Qualification Group E	21 November 2018	2017	Champions (2001, 2009)	4th
Hungary	Top 6 ranked of 2nd-placed teams in Qualification	21 November 2018	2017	Runner-up (1950, 1956)	50th
Ukraine	Top 6 ranked of 2nd-placed teams in Qualification	21 November 2018	2017	Champions (1995)	38th
Sweden	Top 6 ranked of 2nd-placed teams in Qualification	21 November 2018	2015	7th Place (1987, 2013)	41st

== Draw ==
The final draw took place on 12 December 2018 in Belgrade, Serbia. The mascots Pick and Roll made their first appearance in the draw.

=== Seedings ===
The official seedings for the FIBA Women's EuroBasket 2019 Draw were established on 10 December 2019.

Co-Hosts Latvia and Serbia were each allowed to select one other team to play in the opposite group they were hosting but not playing in. Latvia chose Sweden to play in Group A, while Serbia selected Slovenia, who will play in Group D.

Pot 1	Pot 2	Pot 3	Pot 4
France; Spain; Russia; Turkey	Belgium; Latvia (co-host); Italy; Czech Republic	Serbia (co-host); Ukraine; Hungary; Montenegro	Slovenia; Belarus; Great Britain; Sweden

== Squads ==
All rosters consist of 12 players.

== First round ==
The schedule was confirmed on 13 February 2019.

=== Group A ===
Pos	Team	Pld	W	L	PF	PA	PD	Pts	Qualification
1	Spain	3	3	0	221	192	+29	6	Quarterfinals
2	Great Britain	3	2	1	201	181	+20	5	Qualification for quarterfinals
3	Latvia (H)	3	1	2	198	207	−9	4	Qualification for quarterfinals
4	Ukraine	3	0	3	205	245	−40	3	

Source: FIBA
Rules for classification: 1) Points; 2) Head-to-head results; 3) Points difference; 4) Points scored.
(H) Hosts

27 June 2019
Great Britain	74–60	Latvia
Ukraine	77–95	Spain
28 June 2019
Latvia	82–74	Ukraine
Spain	67–59	Great Britain
30 June 2019
Ukraine	54–68	Great Britain
Latvia	56–59	Spain

=== Group B ===
Pos	Team	Pld	W	L	PF	PA	PD	Pts	Qualification
1	France	3	3	0	233	179	+54	6	Quarterfinals
2	Sweden	3	1	2	196	193	+3	4 (Note: Sweden 3 Pts, +9 PD; Montenegro 3 Pts, −3 PD; Czech Republic 3 Pts, −6 PD)	Qualification for quarterfinals
3	Montenegro	3	1	2	174	212	−38	4	Qualification for quarterfinals
4	Czech Republic	3	1	2	189	208	−19	4	

Source: FIBA
Rules for classification: 1) Points; 2) Head-to-head results; 3) Points difference; 4) Points scored.
Notes:

27 June 2019
Sweden	67–51	Montenegro
France	74–61	Czech Republic
28 June 2019
Czech Republic	71–64	Sweden
Montenegro	53–88	France
30 June 2019
Czech Republic	57–70	Montenegro
Sweden	65–71	France

=== Group C ===
Pos	Team	Pld	W	L	PF	PA	PD	Pts	Qualification
1	Hungary	3	2	1	205	194	+11	5 (Note: Italy 51–59 Hungary)	Quarterfinals
2	Italy	3	2	1	183	170	+13	5	Qualification for quarterfinals
3	Slovenia	3	1	2	203	218	−15	4 (Note: Slovenia 62–55 Turkey)	Qualification for quarterfinals
4	Turkey	3	1	2	168	177	−9	4	

Source: FIBA
Rules for classification: 1) Points; 2) Head-to-head results; 3) Points difference; 4) Points scored.
Notes:

27 June 2019
Hungary	88–84	Slovenia
Turkey	54–57	Italy
28 June 2019
Slovenia	62–55	Turkey
Italy	51–59	Hungary
30 June 2019
Hungary	58–59	Turkey
Italy	75–57	Slovenia

=== Group D ===
Pos	Team	Pld	W	L	PF	PA	PD	Pts	Qualification
1	Serbia (H)	3	3	0	202	182	+20	6	Quarterfinals
2	Belgium	3	1	2	194	193	+1	4 (Note: Belgium 3 Pts, +5 PD; Russia 3 Pts, +1 PD; Belarus 3 Pts, −6 PD)	Qualification for quarterfinals
3	Russia	3	1	2	193	206	−13	4	Qualification for quarterfinals
4	Belarus	3	1	2	184	192	−8	4	

Source: FIBA
Rules for classification: 1) Points; 2) Head-to-head results; 3) Points difference; 4) Points scored.
(H) Hosts
Notes:

27 June 2019
Russia	54–67	Belgium
Belarus	53–55	Serbia
28 June 2019
Belgium	61–69	Belarus
Serbia	77–63	Russia
30 June 2019
Belarus	62–76	Russia
Belgium	66–70	Serbia

== Final round ==
Qualification for quarterfinals
2 July
Italy	54
Russia	63
1 July
Sweden	77
Latvia	62
2 July
Belgium	72
Slovenia	67
1 July
Great Britain	92
Montenegro	71

Quarterfinals
4 July
Spain	78
Russia	54
4 July
Serbia	87
Sweden	49
4 July
France (OT)	84
Belgium	80
4 July
Hungary	59
Great Britain	62

Semifinals
6 July
Spain	71
Serbia	66
6 July
France	63
Great Britain	56

Final
7 July
Spain	86
France	66
Third place game
7 July
Serbia	81
Great Britain	55

Class. games to OQTs

Class. game to OQTs
6 July
Russia	52
Sweden	57

Class. game to OQTs
6 July
Belgium	72
Hungary	56

=== Final ===
7 July 2019
20:30

Boxscore

Spain	86–66	France
Scoring by quarter: 32–21, 18–15, 20–20, 16–10
Pts: Xargay 23; Rebs: Gil 10; Asts: Cruz, Xargay 4		Pts: Gruda 18; Rebs: Gruda 6 Asts: three players 4

Štark Arena, Belgrade
Attendance: 3,622
Referees: Jasmina Juras (SRB), Maj Forsberg (DEN), Özlem Yalman (TUR)

== Final ranking ==
Qualified for the 2020 FIBA Women's Olympic Qualifying Tournaments

Rank	Team	Record
Gold medal	Spain	6–0
Silver medal	France	5–1
Bronze medal	Serbia	5–1
4th	Great Britain	4–3
Eliminated in the quarterfinals
5th	Belgium	3–3
6th	Sweden	3–3
7th	Hungary	2–3
8th	Russia	2–4
Eliminated in the qualification for quarterfinals
9th	Italy	2–2
10th	Slovenia	1–3
11th	Latvia	1–3
12th	Montenegro	1–3
Eliminated in the first round
13th	Belarus	1–2
14th	Turkey	1–2
15th	Czech Republic	1–2
16th	Ukraine	0–3

FIBA Women's EuroBasket 2019 Champions

Spain
4th title

Team roster: Astou Ndour, Laura Nicholls, Cristina Ouviña, Silvia Domínguez, Laia Palau, Marta Xargay, Tamara Abalde, Anna Cruz, María Pina, Queralt Casas, Laura Gil, Andrea Vilaró
Head coach: Lucas Mondelo

== Statistics and awards ==
=== Statistical leaders ===
Points

Name	PPG
(United Kingdom) Temi Fagbenle	20.9
(Latvia) Elīna Dikaioulaku	20.8
(Belgium) Emma Meesseman	19.8
(France) Sandrine Gruda	15.5
(Belgium) Kim Mestdagh	14.8
(Spain) Astou Ndour	14.8
(Russia) Maria Vadeeva	14.8

Rebounds

Name	RPG
(Sweden) Amanda Zahui B.	9.3
(Russia) Maria Vadeeva	9.0
(Spain) Astou Ndour	8.2
(Spain) Laura Nicholls	8.0
(Hungary) Bernadett Határ	8.0

Assists

Name	APG
(Slovenia) Nika Barič	8.5
(France) Olivia Époupa	5.3
(Montenegro) Božica Mujović	4.8
(United Kingdom) Johannah Leedham	4.7
(Spain) Laia Palau	4.5
(Latvia) Elīna Dikaioulaku	4.5

Blocks

Name	BPG
(Montenegro) Milica Jovanović	2.0
(Sweden) Amanda Zahui B.	1.8
(Hungary) Bernadett Határ	1.6
(Belgium) Kyara Linskens	1.3
(Belgium) Emma Meesseman	1.3
(Russia) Maria Vadeeva	1.3

Steals

Name	SPG
(United Kingdom) Johannah Leedham	3.4
(France) Olivia Époupa	2.7
(Montenegro) Glory Johnson	2.3
(Sweden) Elin Eldebrink	2.0
(Slovenia) Shante Evans	2.0
(Montenegro) Božica Mujović	2.0

=== Awards ===
The all star-teams and MVP was announced on 7 July 2019.

All-Star Team
Guard	Forwards	Centers
(Spain) Marta Xargay	(Serbia) Sonja Petrović (United Kingdom) Temi Fagbenle	(France) Sandrine Gruda (Spain) Astou Ndour
MVP: (Spain) Astou Ndour
