= Nika Barič =

Slovenian basketball player

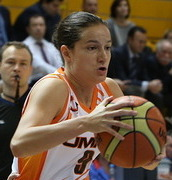

No. 9 – Nika Syktyvkar
- Position: Point guard
- League: Russian Women's Basketball Premier League; EuroCup Women

Personal information
- Born: 2 September 1992 (age 34) Trbovlje, Slovenia
- Listed height: 5 ft 7 in (1.70 m)
- Listed weight: 136 lb (62 kg)

Career information
- WNBA draft: 2012: 2nd round, 20th overall pick
- Drafted by: Minnesota Lynx
- Playing career: 2007–present

Career history
- 2007–2011: Athlete Celje
- 2011–2015: Spartak Moscow Region
- 2015–2019: UMMC Ekaterinburg
- 2019–2020: Dynamo Kursk
- 2020–2021: Elazığ İl Özel İdarespor
- 2021–2022: Dynamo Kursk
- 2022–2022: Çukurova Basketbol
- 2022–2023: Nika Syktyvkar
- 2023–2024: CCC Polkowice

Career highlights
- FIBA Europe Young Women's Player of the Year Award (2010)
- Stats at Basketball Reference

Nika Barič (born 2 September 1992) is a Slovenian basketball player. She was selected in the second round of the 2012 WNBA draft (20th overall) by the Minnesota Lynx but was waived in May 2016 without ever having played for the team.

She represented Slovenia at the 2017, 2019, and 2021 Eurobasket which was managed by coach Damir Grgić throughout this period. In April 2023, two months before the 2023 tournament which was to be co-hosted by her native Slovenia, Barič was kicked off the national team over her controversial remarks in social media in which she disparaged the leadership of the Basketball Federation of Slovenia for having retained services of Greek coach George Dikeoulakos to manage the team at the next Eurobasket and stated there was 'no need to hire foreign coaches when Slovene coaches, such as Damir Grgić were available'. A few days later, Barič followed-up with a clarification of her earlier statement saying it was not a personal attack on Dikeoulakos but rather a repeated comment (which she had previously made in October 2021) on the work of the Basketball Federation which, she thought, had been unfair to Grgić by dismissing him after he had led the team successfully at three different Eurobasket competitions.
