= Crystal Hall, Zrenjanin =

Crystal Hall
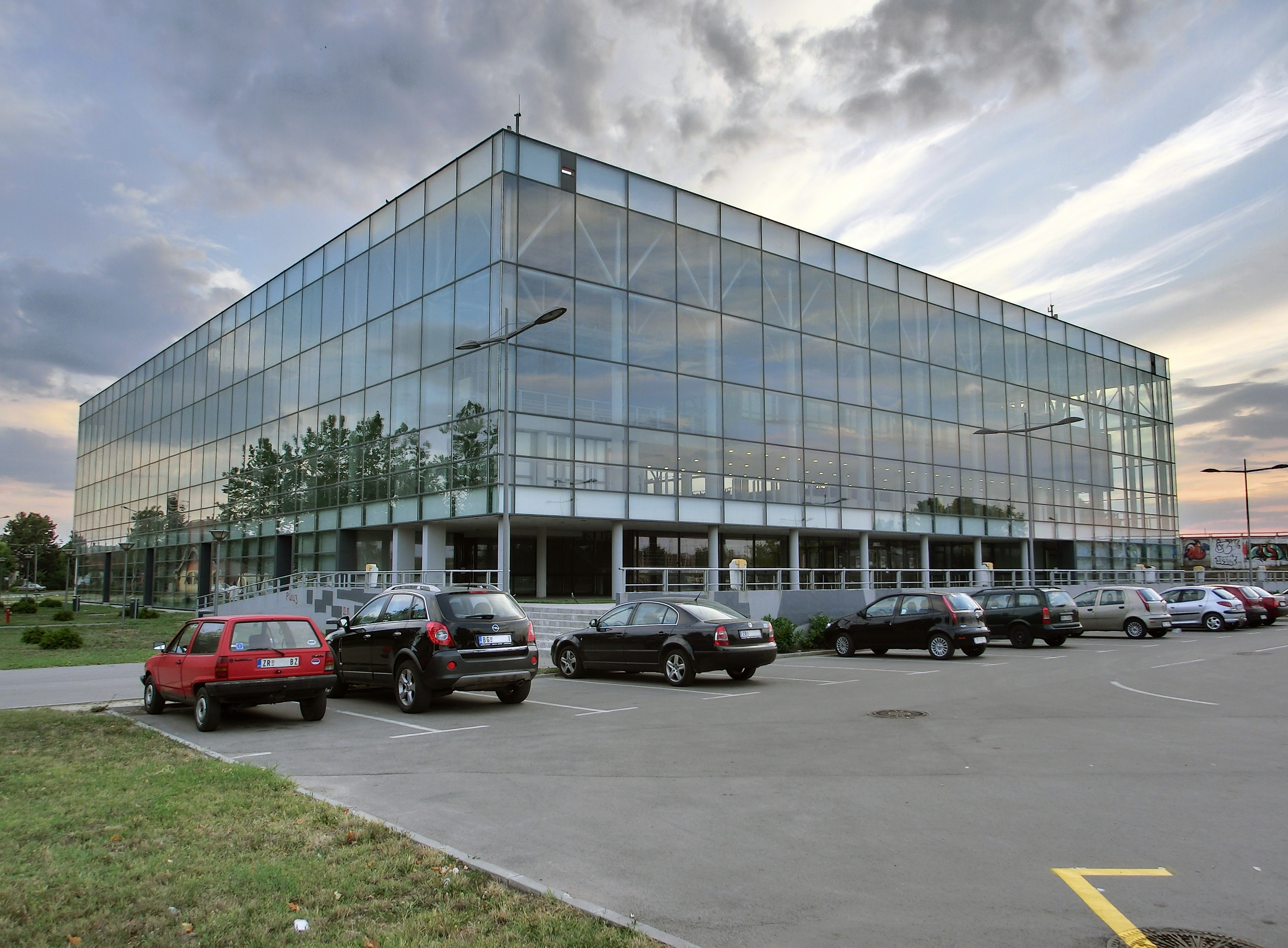
- Crystal Hall exterior in August 2012
- Interactive map of Crystal Hall
- Location: Zrenjanin, Serbia
- Coordinates: 45°23′08″N 20°23′57″E
- Owner: City of Zrenjanin
- Operator: Zrenjanin
- Capacity: 2,800 (basketball, handball)

Construction
- Groundbreaking: 2006
- Opened: 30 June 2009; 17 years ago
- Cost: 720 million RSD
- Architects: AGM, AD Servo Mihalj Inženjering

Tenants
- KK Proleter Zrenjanin (2009–present); RK Proleter Zrenjanin (2009–present)

Crystal Hall (Serbian: Кристална дворана / Kristalna dvorana) is an indoor arena in Zrenjanin. It has a capacity of 2,800 people.

== History ==
The construction of Crystal Hall began in 2006 and was finished in 2009, for the needs of 2009 Summer Universiade. The construction costs were 720 million Serbian dinars in total, exceeded the original cost projections twice. It is the home arena of basketball club Proleter Zrenjanin.

In 2013, the hall was home venue to the 2013 World Women's Handball Championship.

During 2018 and 2019, the city of Zrenjanin allocated significant investments in equipping the hall, for the needs of FIBA Women's EuroBasket 2019.

== See also ==
- List of indoor arenas in Serbia
- Architecture of Serbia
