= Basketball Federation of Slovenia =

Sports governing body in Slovenia

- Košarkarska zveza Slovenije
- Sport: Basketball
- Jurisdiction: Slovenia
- Abbreviation: KZS
- Founded: 1950
- Affiliation: FIBA
- Regional affiliation: FIBA Europe
- Headquarters: Ljubljana
- President: Matej Erjavec
- Director: Saša Dončić
- Secretary: Aleš Križnar
- Men's coach: Aleksander Sekulić
- Women's coach: Dávid Gáspár
- Replaced: Basketball Federation of Yugoslavia (1950–1992)

Official website
- www.kzs.si
- (Slovenia)

The Basketball Federation of Slovenia (Slovene: Košarkarska zveza Slovenije) also known as KZS is the governing body of basketball in Slovenia. It was founded in 1950 as a member of the larger Yugoslav Basketball Federation (see also: Basketball in Yugoslavia). In 1992, KZS joined the International Basketball Federation (FIBA) on its own.

The Basketball Federation of Slovenia operates the Slovenia men's national team and Slovenia women's national team. They organize national competitions in Slovenia, for both the men's and women's senior teams and also the youth national basketball teams.

The top professional league in Slovenia is the Premier A Slovenian Basketball League.

== See also ==
- Slovenia men's national basketball team
- Slovenia women's national basketball team
- Slovenia men's national under-20 basketball team
- Slovenia men's national under-19 basketball team
- Slovenia men's national under-17 basketball team
