= Tereza Vyoralová =

Czech basketball player (born 1994)

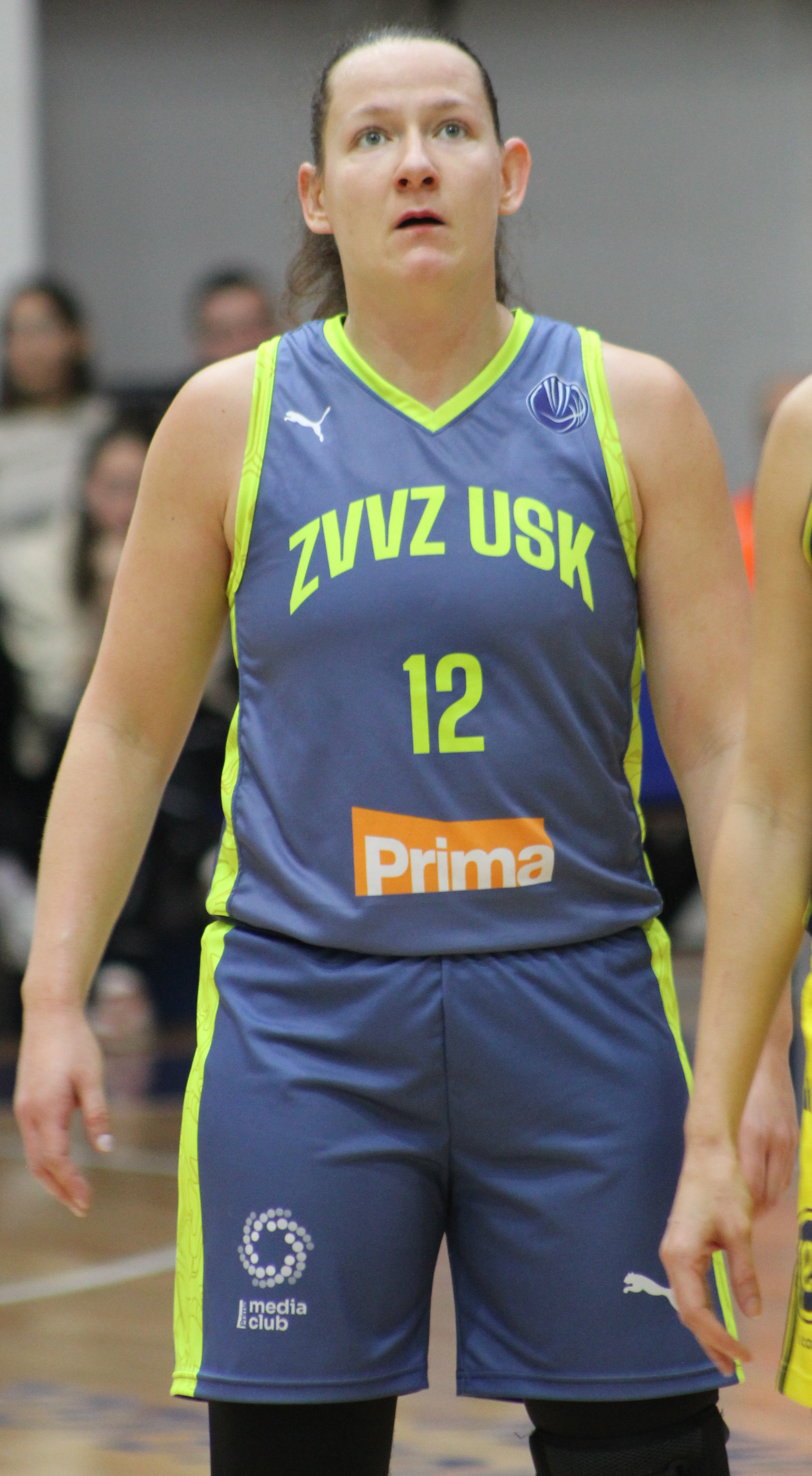

No. 12 – USK Praha
- Position: Point guard
- League: ŽBL

Personal information
- Born: January 16, 1994 (age 32) Weißenfels, Germany
- Listed height: 5 ft 9 in (1.75 m)

Career highlights
- EuroLeague Women champion (2025)

Tereza Vyoralová (born January 16, 1994) is a Czech basketball player for USK Praha and the Czech national team, where she participated at the 2014 FIBA World Championship.
