= Cristina Ouviña =

Spanish basketball player (born 1990)

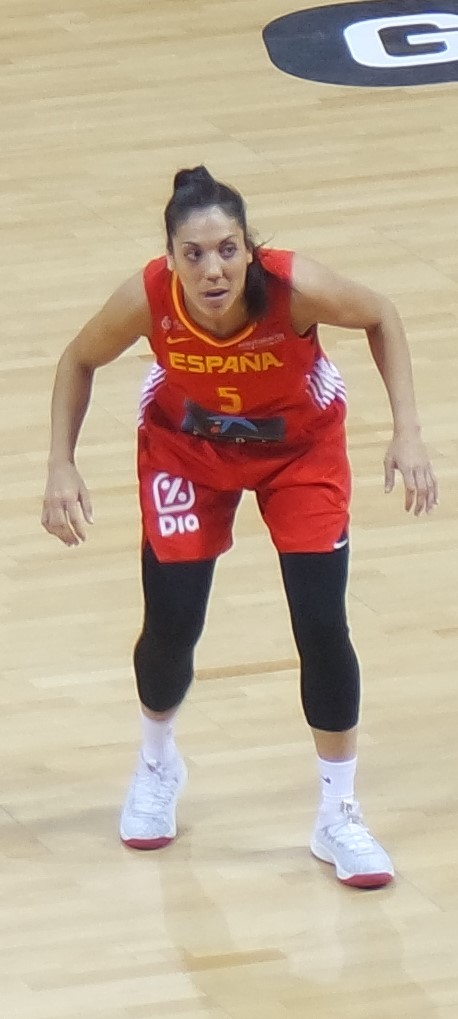
- Cristina playing in Zaragoza

No. 5 – Valencia Basket
- Position: Point guard
- League: LF

Personal information
- Born: 18 September 1990 (age 36) Zaragoza, Aragón, Spain
- Listed height: 5 ft 8 in (1.73 m)

Career history
- 2006–2012: Mann Filter Zaragoza
- 2012–2016: Wisła Can-Pack Kraków
- 2016–2017: Nadezhda Orenburg
- 2017–2019: Bourges Basket
- 2019–2020: USK Praha
- 2020–2024: Valencia Basket

Career highlights
- 3× Polish League champion (2014, 2015, 2016); 2× Polish Cup champion (2014, 2015); French League champion (2018); French Cup champion (2018); EuroCup champion (2021)
Medals
Women's basketball
Representing Spain
World Cup
Bronze medal – third place	2018 Spain
EuroBasket
Gold medal – first place	2013 France
Gold medal – first place	2019 Serbia/Latvia
Silver medal – second place	2023 Israel/Slovenia

Cristina Ouviña Modrego (Note: In this Spanish name, the first or paternal surname is Ouviña and the second or maternal family name is Modrego.) (born 18 September 1990) is a Spanish basketball player. She plays for Valencia Basket and the Spain women's national basketball team. She is a point guard and winner of the EuroBasket in France 2013. She is known for her speed, her desire to learn, and her work ethic.

== Biography ==
=== As basketball player ===
Cristina Ouviña Modrego began her basketball career with Basket Lupus for eight years, after which she joined the Helios Swimming Center. She went international with the Spanish Under-16 in August 2006 and won the gold medal in the European Championship of this category, held in Košice, Slovakia. She was valuable in most of the matches of the tournament and produced 19 points in the final against the Czech Republic (80–78).

On 30 June 2013, the Spanish national team, with Ouviña, won the EuroBasket gold medal against France (70–69).

== Career ==
=== Season 2006–07 ===
She became part of the basketball team Mann Filter Zaragoza, wearing the number 14. She averaged 2.5 points per game and 8.9 minutes per game. She was a candidate to participate in the Spanish Championship. However, the crossed ligament and meniscus in her right leg was damaged and required surgery, which she underwent in the Chiron Clinic Zaragoza.

=== Season 2007–08 ===
After recovering from her knee injury, she continued to improve her skills and averaged 9.3 minutes, 2.9 points, 1.2 rebounds and 0.4 assists per game. That summer, she played with the Spanish team in the Under-18 European Tournament in Nitra, Slovakia. She averaged 24.7 minutes, 9.2 points, 3.8 rebounds and 3.5 assists.

=== Season 2008–09 ===
During the 2008–09 season, Ouviña averaged 15.9 minutes, 4.6 points, 2.1 rebounds and 1.4 assists. The summer had been one of the best, and she played in the European Under-20 Championship in Gdynia, Poland, where her team won the silver medal after losing to France (74–52). Ouviña was the top scorer in the final with 17 points. For the tournament, she averaged 23.4 minutes, 6.9 points, 2.6 rebounds and 2.1 assists.

In the 2009 Under-19 World Championship in Thailand, her team won the silver medal after losing to the United States team (87–71). The medal was the first for a Spanish women's team at a world championship. Ouviña was chosen as the best point guard in the ideal team; she averaged 23.4 minutes, 9 points, 2.6 rebounds and 2.1 assists. The All-World Championship team featured her teammate Marta Xargay.

=== Season 2009–10 ===
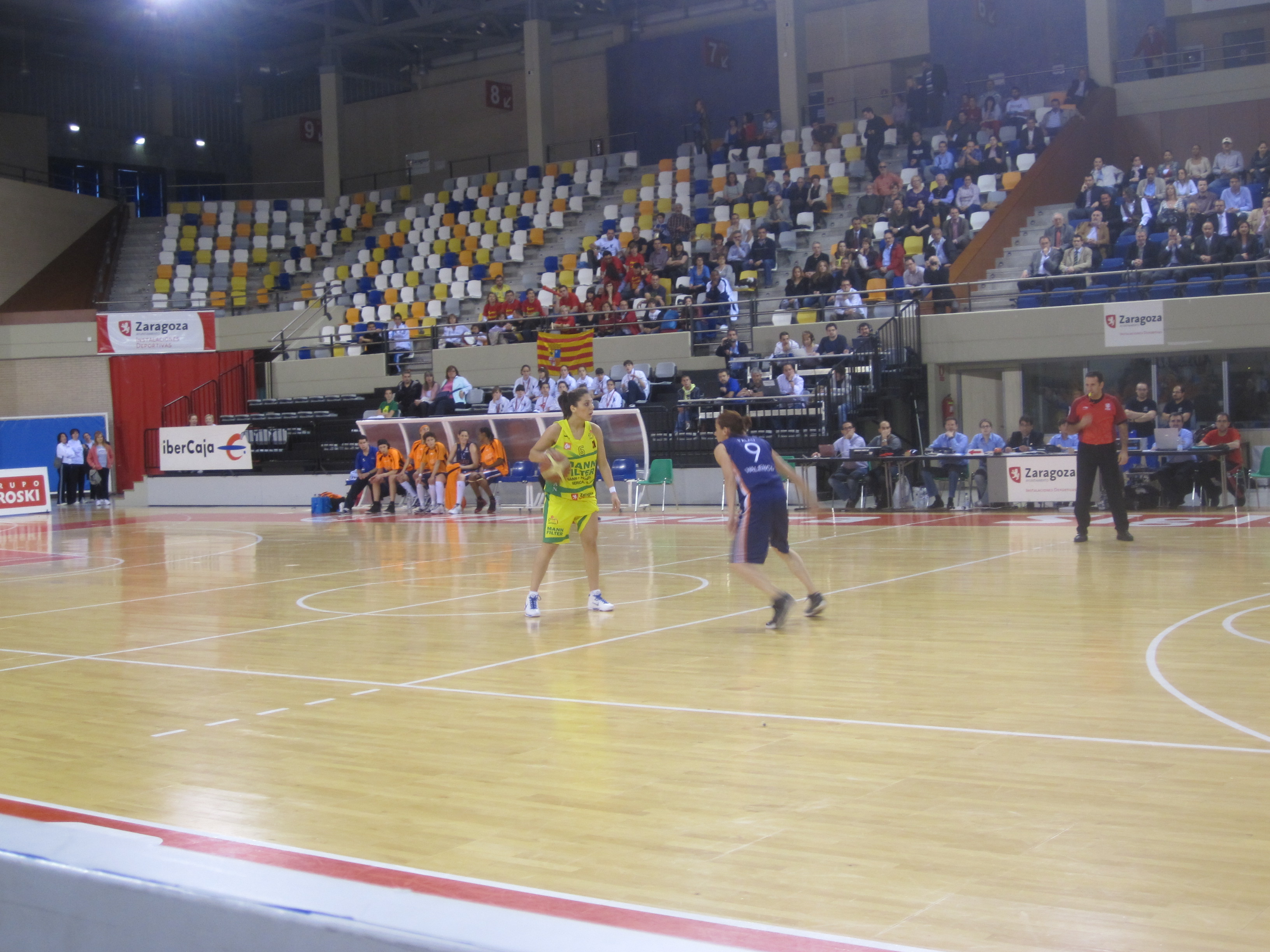
Cristina Ouviña playing against her idol Laia Palau.

During the preseason, Ouviña's team won the Aragon Championship against Stadium Casablanca in the final, in which she scored 15 points. In the regular season, she averaged 27.3 minutes, 7.5 points, 3.2 rebounds, 2.8 steals, and 3.2 assists per game. CDB Zaragoza, Ouviña's team, finished the season in fourth place and participated in the play-offs for the league title against Ros Casares Valencia. The team was eliminated after the first round. Ouviña averaged 28 minutes, 5 points, 4.5 rebounds, 5 assists, and 2 steals.

She played her last championship with the under age selections, the 2009 European U-20 in Latvia, where the Spanish team won another silver medal after losing to Russia. She was the principal point guard of the national team, and averaged 28.9 minutes, 11.2 points, 3.8 assists and 5 rebounds per game. Her highlight game of the tournament was the final, during which she tallied 24 points, 8 rebounds, 3 assists and 4 steals. With just a few seconds remaining, the coach instructed her to be the shooter, but the play was ineffective.

In January 2010, she played with CDB Zaragoza in the Queen's Cup, which was celebrated in her hometown in the Prince Felipe of Zaragoza, where her team was eliminated by Ros Casares Valencia in the semifinal (75–52). Ouviña played more than 30 minutes and recorded 9 points, 3 rebounds, 6 assists, 4 steals and 7 faults.

=== Season 2010–11 ===
In his fifth season in the team, Ouviña averaged 21.1 minutes, 5 points, 2.7 rebounds, 3 assists, 1.9 steals. On 23 October 2010, in Hondarribia, Spain, she played her 100th official match since her debut with the first team. She also played in the EuroCup Women, during which her team reached the quarterfinals. Ouviña averaged 21.7 minutes, 4.9 points, 2.7 rebounds, 3.2 assists and 2 steals.

On 5 May, the national coach, Jose Ignacio Hernandez, selected 15 players, including Ouviña, for the Eurobasket 2011 in Poland.

== Awards ==
=== Team awards ===
- Bronze in 2006 Spain Championship regional teams
- Gold in 2006 European U-16 Kosice (Slovakia)
- Silver in 2009 European U-20 in Gdynia (Poland)
- Silver in 2009 World U-19 in Bangkok (Thailand
- Silver in 2010 European U-20 in Latvia
- Gold in 2013 Eurobasket (France)
- Bronze in 2018 World Championships (Spain)

=== Individual awards ===
- Aragonesa Sportsman Trophy As Outstanding (2006)
- Best AZAB (Zaragoza's Friends Basketball Association) player (2007)
- Best Athlete Pledge Of Aragon (2009)
- Caesaraugusto trophy Fem (2009)
- Best World U-19 Point-guard (2009)
- Included in the All-World U-19 Team (2009)

=== EuroLeague and EuroCup statistics ===
Winner

Season	Team	GP	MPP	PPP	RPP	APP
2012–13 EuroLeague	(Poland) Wisła Can-Pack Kraków	12	28.7	6.1	3.5	4.8
2013–14 EuroLeague	(Poland) Wisła Can-Pack Kraków	14	29.8	4.9	2.5	4.1
2014–15 EuroLeague	(Poland) Wisła Can-Pack Kraków	12	16.7	2.8	2.3	1.1
2015–16 EuroLeague	(Poland) Wisła Can-Pack Kraków	12	35.3	10.0	5.9	5.0
2016–17 EuroLeague	(Russia) Nadezhda Orenburg	17	31.8	5.6	5.1	4.9
2017–18 EuroLeague	(France) Bourges Basket	8	25.5	8.0	3.3	4.4
2018–19 EuroLeague	(France) Bourges Basket	16	26.1	8.4	3.8	3.6
2019–20 EuroLeague	(Czech Republic) USK Praha	14	27.6	8.3	5.7	5.4
2020–21 EuroCup	(Spain) Valencia Basket	4	27.5	3.3	1.5	7.5
2021-22 EuroCup	(Spain) Valencia Basket					

== National team ==
She made her debut with Spain women's national basketball team at the age of 20 in 2011, although she wasn't regularly in the roster for final tournaments until 2018.

- 2006 FIBA Europe Under-16 Championship (youth)
- 5th 2008 FIBA Europe Under-18 Championship (youth)
- 2009 FIBA Europe Under-20 Championship (youth)
- 2009 FIBA Under-19 World Championship (youth)
- 2010 FIBA Europe Under-20 Championship (youth)
- 2013 Eurobasket
- 2018 World Championship
- 2019 Eurobasket
- 7th 2021 Eurobasket
- 6th 2020 Summer Olympics
- 2023 Eurobasket
