= Maria Kliundikova =

Russian basketball player (born 1998)

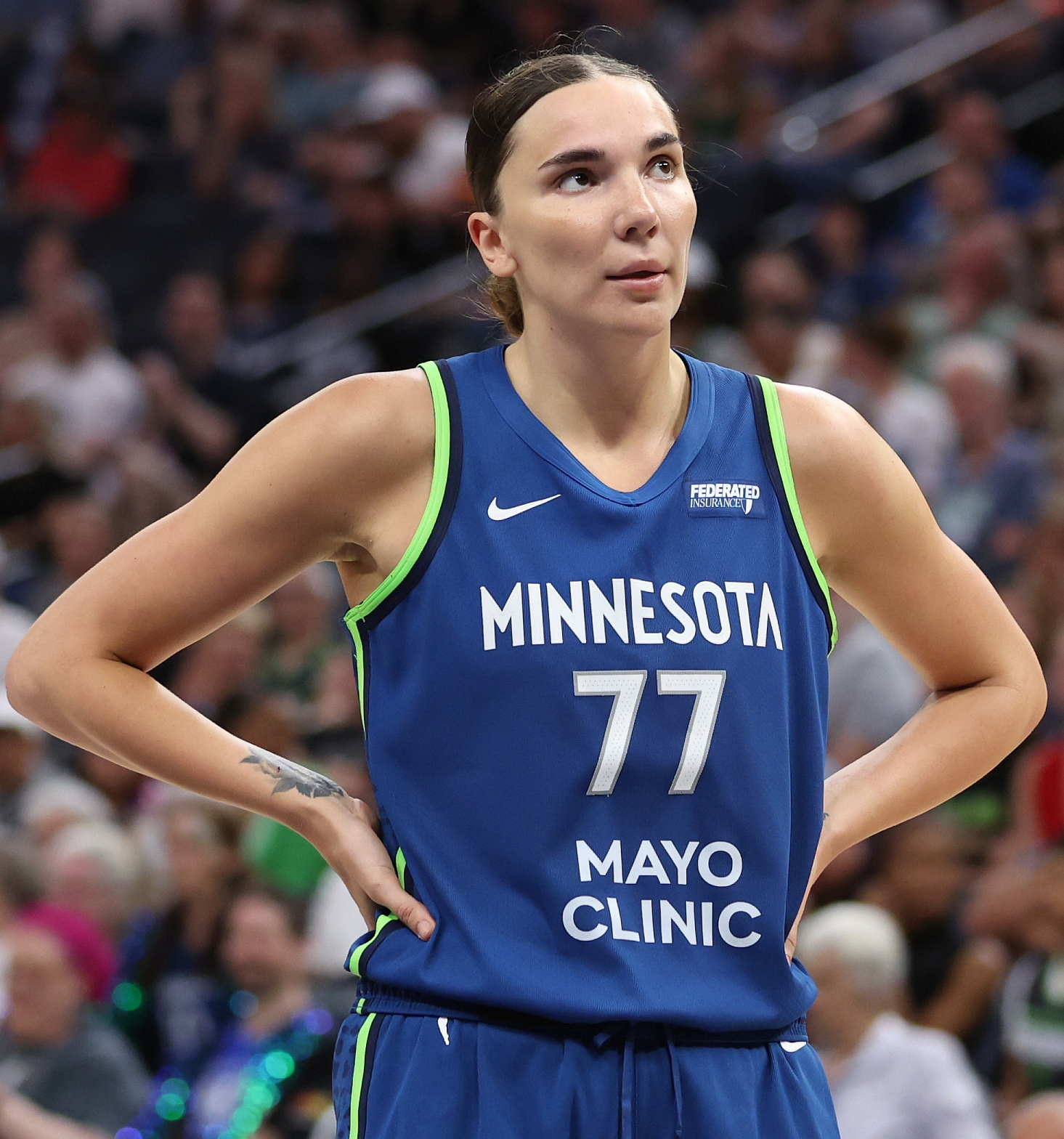
- Kliundikova with the Minnesota Lynx in 2025

Connecticut Sun
- Position: Center
- League: WNBA

Personal information
- Born: 16 July 1998 (age 28) Moscow, Russia
- Listed height: 6 ft 4 in (1.93 m)
- Listed weight: 185 lb (84 kg)

Career information
- WNBA draft: 2018: 1st round, 11th overall pick
- Drafted by: Los Angeles Sparks
- Playing career: 2014–present

Career history
- 2014–2016: Sparta&K Moscow
- 2016–2018: Dynamo Kursk
- 2018–2019: Los Angeles Sparks
- 2018–2025: UMMC Ekaterinburg
- 2025: Minnesota Lynx
- 2026: Toronto Tempo
- 2026: Connecticut Sun

Career highlights
- EuroLeague champion (2017); FIBA U19 World Cup MVP (2017)
- Stats at Basketball Reference
Medals
Representing Russia
Basketball
FIBA U19 World Cup
| Gold medal – first place | 2017 Italy | Team |
| Silver medal – second place | 2015 Russia | Team |
FIBA Europe U16 Championship
| Gold medal – first place | 2014 Hungary | Team |

Maria Alekseyevna Kliundikova née Vadeeva (Russian: Мари́я Алексéевна Вадéева; born 16 July 1998) is a Russian professional basketball player, who last played in 2025 with the Minnesota Lynx of the Women's National Basketball Association (WNBA). (Her exclusive rights were held by the Connecticut Sun, who will move to Houston in 2027 to become Houston Comets.) She was selected 11th overall by the Los Angeles Sparks in the 2018 WNBA draft. She is the first player to debut in the league who was born after the WNBA was officially founded on April 24, 1996.

== Career ==
=== Europe ===
In 2014, Kliundikova began her professional career with Sparta&K Moscow, playing in the Russian Premier League and the EuroCup. In 2016, Vadeeva moved south and signed with Dynamo Kursk, still playing in the Premier League as well as the EuroLeague. In the 2016–17 season, Dynamo Kursk took home the title.

=== WNBA ===
==== Los Angeles Sparks (2018–2019) ====
Kliundikova was drafted by the Los Angeles Sparks with the 11th overall pick in the 2018 WNBA draft. Kliundikova had some visa issues that didn't allow her to join the team right away. She played in 25 games during her rookie season.

On 26 May 2019, Kliundikova made her first career start in the opening game of the 2019 season, a 70–83 loss to the Las Vegas Aces, in which she scored a career-high 24 points. However, she then left the Sparks to represent Russia in the EuroBasket Women 2019. During the competition, she suffered a knee injury and did not return to play for the Sparks until August. Overall for the season, she appeared in 15 games and averaged 7.8 points and 3.9 rebounds per game.

Kliundikova did not return to the WNBA until 2025, with the Sparks still holding her rights. She signed a training camp contract with the Sparks on 13 February 2025. She was waived by the Sparks on 15 May and did not make the final roster.

==== Minnesota Lynx (2025) ====
On 6 June 2025, she signed an end of season contract with the Minnesota Lynx.

==== Toronto Tempo (2026) ====
On 3 April 2026, she was drafted 14th overall by the Toronto Tempo in the 2026 WNBA expansion draft becoming the first Russian-born player to be drafted from an expansion draft from either the WNBA or the NBA. Kliundikova opted not to play in the WNBA during the 2026 season. On 31 July 2026, her rights were traded by Toronto to the Connecticut Sun.

== WNBA career statistics ==
Legend
| GP | Games played | GS | Games started | MPG | Minutes per game | RPG | Rebounds per game |
| APG | Assists per game | SPG | Steals per game | BPG | Blocks per game | PPG | Points per game |
| TO | Turnovers per game | FG% | Field-goal percentage | 3P% | 3-point field-goal percentage | FT% | Free-throw percentage |
| **Bold** | Career best | ° | League leader |

=== Regular season ===
| Year | Team | GP | GS | MPG | FG% | 3P% | FT% | RPG | APG | SPG | BPG | TO | PPG |
|---|---|---|---|---|---|---|---|---|---|---|---|---|---|
| 2018 | Los Angeles | 25 | 0 | 8.2 | **.527** | **.333** | .750 | 2.2 | 0.4 | 0.4 | 0.4 | **0.5** | 3.6 |
| 2019 | Los Angeles | 15 | **1** | **12.0** | .490 | .313 | **.769** | **3.9** | **0.7** | **1.0** | 0.2 | 1.2 | **7.8** |
| 2020 | Did not appear in league | | | | | | | | | | | | |
| 2021 | Did not appear in league | | | | | | | | | | | | |
| 2022 | Did not appear in league | | | | | | | | | | | | |
| 2023 | Did not appear in league | | | | | | | | | | | | |
| 2024 | Did not appear in league | | | | | | | | | | | | |
| 2025 | Minnesota | **34** | **1** | 11.0 | .500 | .320 | .571 | 3.0 | 0.6 | 0.7 | **0.8** | 0.7 | 4.4 |
| Career | 3 years, 2 teams | 72 | 2 | 10.2 | .503 | .321 | .674 | 2.9 | 0.5 | 0.7 | 0.5 | 0.7 | 4.8 |

=== Playoffs ===
| Year | Team | GP | GS | MPG | FG% | 3P% | FT% | RPG | APG | SPG | BPG | TO | PPG |
|---|---|---|---|---|---|---|---|---|---|---|---|---|---|
| 2018 | Los Angeles | 1 | 0 | 3.0 | **1.000** | .000 | .000 | 0.0 | 0.0 | 0.0 | 0.0 | 0.0 | **2.0** |
| 2019 | Los Angeles | **3** | 0 | **8.3** | .100 | .000 | .000 | **2.3** | **0.7** | 0.0 | **1.0** | 0.7 | 0.7 |
| Career | 2 year, 1 team | 4 | 0 | 7.0 | .182 | .000 | .000 | 1.8 | 0.5 | 0.0 | 0.8 | 0.5 | 1.0 |

== National team ==
=== Youth level ===
Kliundikova made her international debut at the 2013 FIBA Europe Under-16 Championship in Bulgaria, where Russia placed sixth. Kliundikova once again participated, returning to the 2014 FIBA Europe Under-16 Championship in Hungary, where Russia won the title, taking home their fifth Under-16 Championship. Kliundikova was then named to the national team for the 2015 FIBA Under-19 World Championship in her home nation. Russia would remain undefeated until the final, falling to the United States and taking home silver. Vadeeva was awarded a place on the All-Tournament Team.

=== Senior level ===
Kliundikova made her senior international debut at EuroBasket Women 2015, at just the age of 16. In her debut tournament, Kliundikova averaged 12.3 points per game and 5.9 repounds per game. Kliundikova was once again named to Russia's roster, for EuroBasket Women 2017 in the Czech Republic.
