= Anna Cruz =

Spanish basketball player (born 1986)

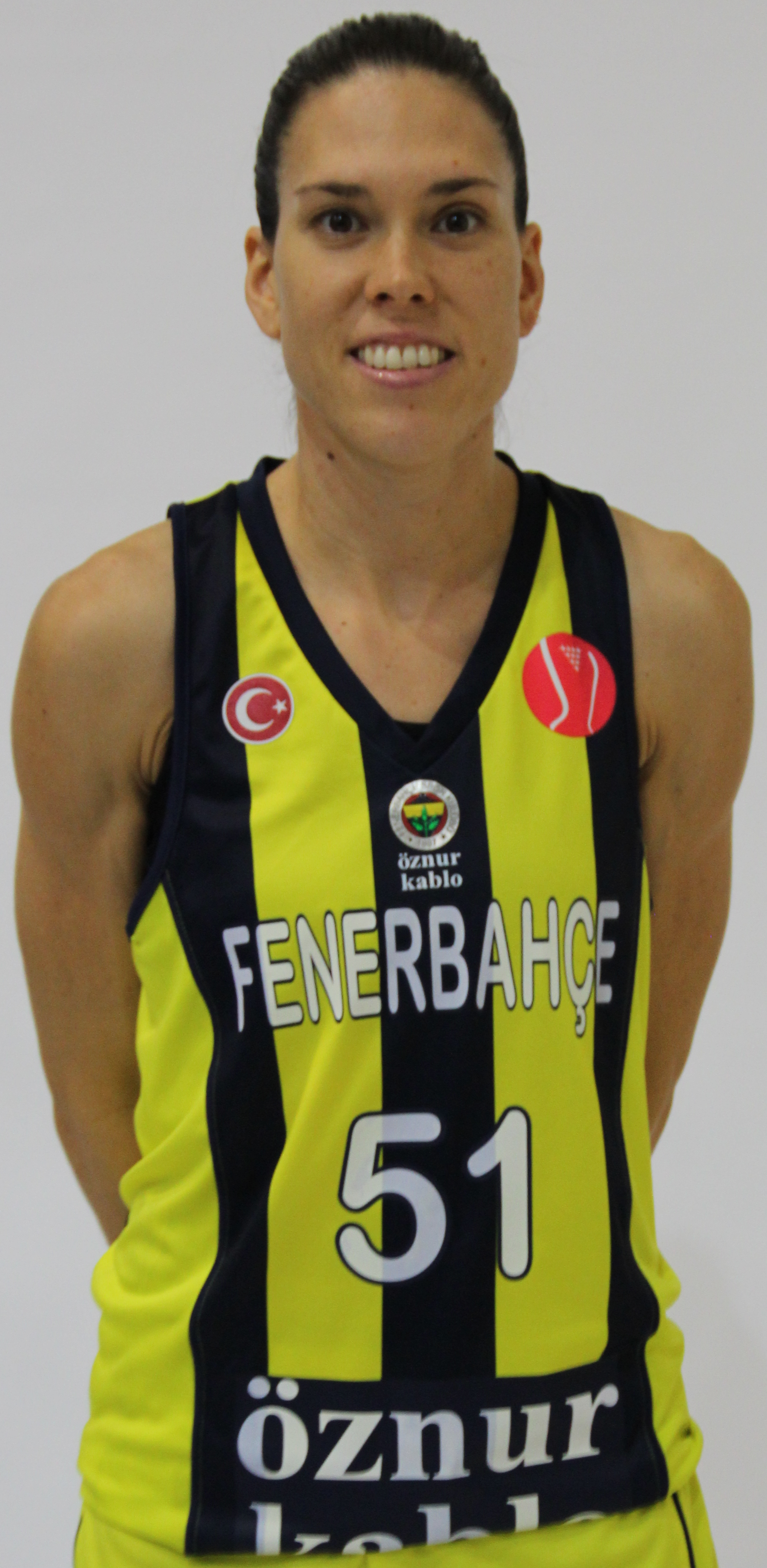

No. 15 – Basket Zaragoza
- Position: Small forward / shooting guard
- League: LF

Personal information
- Born: 27 October 1986 (age 40) Badalona, Barcelona, Spain
- Listed height: 5 ft 8 in (1.73 m)
- Listed weight: 136 lb (62 kg)

Career information
- Playing career: 2002–present

Career history
- 2002–2005: Universitat de Barcelona
- 2005–2008: Arranz-Jopisa Burgos
- 2008–2009: CB Olesa
- 2009–2013: Rivas Ecópolis
- 2013–2016: Nadezhda Orenburg
- 2014: New York Liberty
- 2015–2016: Minnesota Lynx
- 2016–2019: Dynamo Kursk
- 2019-2019: Fenerbahçe
- 2019-2020: Araski AES
- 2020-present: Basket Zaragoza

Career highlights
- WNBA champion (2015); EuroLeague champion (2017); Baltic League champion (2017); 2× Spanish League champion (2003, 2005); 2× Spanish Cup champion (2011, 2013)
- Stats at WNBA.com
- Stats at Basketball Reference

Anna Cruz Lebrato (Note: In this Spanish name, the first or paternal surname is Cruz and the second or maternal family name is Lebrato.) (born 27 October 1986) is a Spanish professional basketball player, currently playing for Spanish team Barça CBS (F.C.Barcelona). She developed her professional career in several clubs in Spain, Russia, Turkey and the United States, and had 178 caps for the Spain's national basketball team from 2009 to 2019, winning a total of eight medals. She also won the 2015 WNBA, the 2017 EuroLeague and the 2017 and 2019 EuroBaskets.

== Club career ==
Cruz started playing basketball in clubs in her hometown Barcelona, making the debut in the Spanish top tier league with UB-Barça at 16, still a junior. Despite winning two leagues in 2003 and 2005, the lack of playtime prompted her to move to CB Ciudad de Burgos, but in her third season there the team was relegated and she went back to Barcelona to play at CB Olesa – Espanyol. She played the following four seasons at Rivas Ecópolis in Madrid, winning two Spanish Cups in 2011 and 2013 and playing the four seasons in the EuroLeague.

She moved abroad in 2013 to play for Russian team Nadezhda Orenburg, where she remained for three seasons. Since the summer of 2014 she has combined the European season with the WNBA, first at New York Liberty and with the Minnesota Lynx since 2015, winning the WNBA championship once. She chose to rest for the summer of 2017 and not to play the WNBA season with the Lynx.

At Dynamo Kursk between 2016 and 2019, she won her first Euroleague. title in 2017 under coach Lucas Mondelo. After a short spell at Turkish club Fenerbahçe in 2019, she returned to Spain for the 2020-21 season.

== Career statistics ==
=== Regular season ===
†	Denotes seasons in which Cruz won a WNBA championship

Year	Team	GP	GS	MPG	FG%	3P%	FT%	RPG	APG	SPG	BPG	TO	PPG
2014	New York	34	34	27.1	.462	.347	.692	3.5	3.6	1.3	0.3	2.1	7.7
2015^{†}	Minnesota	22	17	29.1	.474	.250	.786	3.6	3.0	1.0	0.2	2.2	8.0
2016	Minnesota	6	0	10.0	.455	1.000	1.000	1.0	2.0	0.3	0.0	0.3	2.8
Career	3 years, 2 teams	62	51	26.2	.466	.314	.753	3.3	3.2	1.1	0.2	2.0	7.4

=== Playoffs ===
Year	Team	GP	GS	MPG	FG%	3P%	FT%	RPG	APG	SPG	BPG	TO	PPG
2015^{†}	Minnesota	10	0	22.1	.385	.308	.667	2.1	2.7	0.9	0.1	1.6	5.2
2016	Minnesota	6	0	8.5	.200	.500	.000	1.0	1.2	0.3	0.0	0.7	1.2
Career	2 years, 1 team	16	0	17.0	.343	.333	.667	1.7	2.1	0.7	0.1	1.3	3.7

=== EuroLeague ===
EuroLeague winner

Season	Team	GP	MPP	PPP	RPP	APP
2009–10	(Spain) Rivas Ecópolis	13	32.2	12.4	4.8	2.5
2010–11	(Spain) Rivas Ecópolis	12	29.8	7.6	3.9	2.7
2011–12	(Spain) Rivas Ecópolis	21	32.9	9.9	4.8	2.9
2012–13	(Spain) Rivas Ecópolis	15	31.8	14.1	4.7	2.7
2013–14	(Russia) Nadezhda Orenburg	17	32.1	8.8	3.7	4.6
2014–15	(Russia) Nadezhda Orenburg	16	30.6	9.3	5.0	4.1
2015–16	(Russia) Nadezhda Orenburg	16	29.8	9.1	4.7	3.9
2016–17	(Russia) Dinamo Kursk	17	31.6	8.2	4.2	5.5
2017–18	(Russia) Dinamo Kursk	10	27.9	6.0	5.4	5.0
2018–19	(Russia) Dinamo Kursk	18	27.9	5.9	4.1	3.7
2019–20	(Turkey) Fenerbahçe	8	23.0	5.6	3.6	2.5

== National team ==
Cruz started playing with Spain's youth teams at 17, winning a total of three medals from 2004 to 2007. She made her debut with the senior team in 2009 at 22 and played her last game in 2019, winning 158 caps 7 PPG, participating in the Rio 2016 Olympics, three World Championships and five European Championships:

- 2004 FIBA Europe Under-18 Championship (youth)
- 5th 2005 FIBA Under-19 World Championship (youth)
- 4th 2006 FIBA Europe Under-20 Championship (youth)
- 9th 2007 FIBA Under-21 World Championship (youth)
- 2009 Eurobasket
- 2010 World Championship
- 9th 2011 Eurobasket
- 2014 World Championship
- 2015 Eurobasket
- 2016 Summer Olympics
- 2017 Eurobasket
- 2018 World Championship
- 2019 Eurobasket

Her buzzer-beater shot against Turkey in the 2016 Rio Olympics quarter-finals is one of her key shots with the national team.
