= Slovenia women's national basketball team =

Slovenia
- FIBA ranking: 26 ▼1 (14 September 2026)
- FIBA zone: FIBA Europe
- National federation: KZS
- Coach: Dávid Gáspár
- Nickname: Rakete (The Rockets)

EuroBasket
- Appearances: 5
Home	Away

First international
- Slovenia 82–61 Georgia (Slovenske Konjice, Slovenia; 15 May 1993)

Biggest win
- Slovenia 127–28 Albania (Durrës, Albania; 14 November 2021)

The Slovenia women's national basketball team (Slovene: Slovenska ženska košarkarska reprezentanca) represents Slovenia in international women's basketball competition and is organized by the Basketball Federation of Slovenia (KZS). In 2023, Slovenia co-hosted the 39th FIBA Women's EuroBasket along with Israel.

The women's national team made their debut at the EuroBasket Women 2017.

== Competitive record ==
For results before 1993, see Yugoslavia women's national basketball team.

=== Olympic Games ===
Olympic Games
Year	Position	Pld	W	L
(United States) Atlanta 1996	Did not qualify			
(Australia) Sydney 2000	Did not qualify			
(Greece) Athens 2004	Did not qualify			
(China) Beijing 2008	Did not qualify			
(United Kingdom) London 2012	Did not qualify			
(Brazil) Rio 2016	Did not qualify			
(Japan) Tokyo 2020	Did not qualify			
(France) Paris 2024	Did not qualify			
(United States) Los Angeles 2028	To be determined			

=== FIBA Women's World Cup ===
Women's World Cup
Year	Position	Pld	W	L
(Australia) 1994	Did not qualify			
(Germany) 1998	Did not qualify			
(China) 2002	Did not qualify			
(Brazil) 2006	Did not qualify			
(Czech Republic) 2010	Did not qualify			
(Turkey) 2014	Did not qualify			
(Spain) 2018	Did not qualify			
(Australia) 2022	Did not qualify			
(Germany) 2026	Did not qualify			
(Japan) 2030	To be determined			

=== EuroBasket Women ===
EuroBasket Women					Qualification		
Year	Position	Pld	W	L	Pld	W	L
(Czech Republic) 1995	Did not qualify				7	3	4
(Hungary) 1997	Did not qualify				6	3	3
(Poland) 1999	Did not qualify				4	1	3
(France) 2001	Did not qualify				4	1	3
(Greece) 2003	Did not qualify				7	4	3
(Turkey) 2005	Division B						
(Italy) 2007	Did not qualify				10	3	7
(Latvia) 2009	Division B						
(Poland) 2011	Division B						
(France) 2013	Did not qualify				8	4	4
(Hungary) / (Romania) 2015	Did not qualify				8	3	5
(Czech Republic) 2017	14th	3	1	2	4	3	1
(Latvia) / (Serbia) 2019	10th	4	1	3	4	4	0
(France) / (Spain) 2021	10th	4	2	2	6	6	0
(Israel) / (Slovenia) 2023	15th	3	0	3	Qualified as co-host		
(Czech Republic) / (Germany) / (Italy) / (Greece) 2025	9th	3	1	2	6	5	1
(Belgium) / (Finland) / (Sweden) / (Lithuania) 2027	to be determined				to be determined		
Total		17	5	12	59	36	34

Note:Red border indicates host nation

== Team ==
=== Current roster ===
Roster for the EuroBasket Women 2025.

Slovenia women's national basketball team roster
Players
Coaches

Pos.	No.	Name	Age – Date of birth	Height	Club	Ctr.
C	1	Eva Lisec	30 – 17 June 1995	1.92 m (6 ft 4 in)	UMMC Ekaterinburg	(Russia)
SG	3	Teja Oblak (C)	34 – 20 December 1990	1.72 m (5 ft 8 in)	Galatasaray	(Turkey)
SG	5	Tina Cvijanovič	27 – 4 March 1998	1.78 m (5 ft 10 in)	San Martino di Lupari	(Italy)
PF	7	Maruša Seničar	28 – 5 May 1997	1.87 m (6 ft 2 in)	Saarlouis Royals	(Germany)
C	10	Teja Goršič	25 – 7 July 1999	1.89 m (6 ft 2 in)	CSM Constanța	(Romania)
SG	13	Zala Friškovec	25 – 10 October 1999	1.80 m (5 ft 11 in)	Sopron Basket	(Hungary)
PF	15	Mojca Jelenc	22 – 4 January 2003	1.97 m (6 ft 6 in)	Valencia Basket	(Spain)
SF	17	Ajša Sivka	19 – 23 November 2005	1.92 m (6 ft 4 in)	Tarbes Gespe Bigorre	(France)
SG	20	Lea Debeljak	23 – 25 October 2001	1.77 m (5 ft 10 in)	Kangoeroes Basket Mechelen	(Belgium)
C	23	Jessica Shepard	28 – 11 September 1996	1.95 m (6 ft 5 in)	Athinaikos	(Greece)
PG	33	Sara Sambolić	21 – 31 May 2004	1.70 m (5 ft 7 in)	KK Ilirija	(Slovenia)
PG	71	Lea Bartelme	19 – 30 December 2005	1.76 m (5 ft 9 in)	UMBC Retrievers	(United States)

Head coach

- (Greece) George Dikeoulakos

Assistant coach(es)

- (Greece) Styliani Kaltsidou

Legend

- (C) Team captain
- Club – describes last
  club before the tournament
- Age – describes age
  on 18 June 2025

=== Head coaches ===
Years	Name	Competition
1992–1994	(Slovenia) Sergej Ravnikar	
1995	(Slovenia) Tone Corel	
1997	(Slovenia) Branko Lah	
1999	(Slovenia) Sergej Ravnikar	
2001–2003	(Serbia and Montenegro) Dragomir Bukvić	
2004–2007	(Slovenia) Boris Zrinski	Eurobasket Women 2005 - Division B
2007–2008	(Croatia) Željko Ciglar	
2008–2010	(Slovenia) Goran Jovanović	Eurobasket Women 2009 - Division B
2010–2013	(Slovenia) Boris Zrinski	Eurobasket Women 2011 - Division B
2013–2014	(Slovenia) Tomo Orešnik	
2014–2021	(Slovenia) Damir Grgić	EuroBasket Women 2017 (14th place); EuroBasket Women 2019 (10th place); EuroBasket Women 2021 (10th place)
2021–2025	(Greece) George Dikeoulakos	EuroBasket Women 2023 (15th place); EuroBasket Women 2025 (9th place)
2025–present	(Hungary) Dávid Gáspár	
