= Sweden women's national basketball team =

Sweden
- FIBA ranking: 30 ▼1 (14 September 2026)
- Joined FIBA: 1952; 74 years ago
- FIBA zone: FIBA Europe
- National federation: SBBF
- Coach: Kevin Taylor Lundgren
- Nickname(s): Blågult (The Blue and Yellow)

EuroBasket
- Appearances: 9
Home	Away

The Sweden women's national basketball team (Swedish: Sveriges damlandslag i basket) represents Sweden in international women's basketball competition and is controlled by the Swedish Basketball Federation. The national team has entered five EuroBasket Women finals, the first in 1978 where they lost all of their matches and finished in 13th place. At the EuroBasket Women 1987 Sweden finished in 7th place, a feat repeated in 2013. In 2019 Sweden reached the quarter-finals and was ranked 5th, a result that secured a spot in the 2020 Olympic qualifying tournament. Sweden will be the co-host of the FIBA Women's EuroBasket in 2027 alongside Belgium, Finland and Lithuania.

Comparing with earlier decades, Sweden improved significantly during the 2010s. This was much thanks to the "Golden Generation" who won medals in junior championships on both European and world levels.

== EuroBasket Women record ==
EuroBasket Women
Year	Round	Position	GP	W	L
1952–1976	Did not enter/qualify				
(Poland) 1978	Classification round	13th	7	0	7
1980	Did not qualify				
(Italy) 1981	Match for 11th place	11th	7	1	6
(Hungary) 1983	Match for 9th place	10th	7	2	5
1985	Did not qualify				
(Spain) 1987	Match for 7th place	7th	7	3	4
1989–2011	Did not qualify				
(France) 2013	Match for 7th place	7th	9	4	5
(Hungary) (Romania) 2015	Preliminary round	14th	4	1	3
2017	Did not qualify				
(Latvia) (Serbia) 2019	Quarterfinals	6th	6	3	3
(France) (Spain) 2021	Quarterfinals	8th	6	2	4
(Israel) (Slovenia) 2023	Did not qualify				
(Czech Republic) (Germany) (Italy) (Greece) 2025	Preliminary round	10th	3	1	2
(Belgium) (Finland) (Sweden) (Lithuania) 2027	Qualified as co-host				
	Best: 5th place		56	17	39

== Current roster ==
Roster for EuroBasket Women 2025.

Sweden women's national basketball roster
Players
Coaches

Pos.	No.	Name	Age – Date of birth	Height	Club	Ctr.
PF	2	Elin Gustavsson	32 – 18 January 1993	1.87 m (6 ft 2 in)	Zagłębie Sosnowiec	(Poland)
PG	3	Lovisa Hjern	26 – 1 March 1999	1.75 m (5 ft 9 in)	Ślęza Wrocław	(Poland)
PF	4	Nathalie Fontaine	31 – 3 October 1993	1.83 m (6 ft 0 in)	Derthona Basket	(Italy)
SG	6	Frida Eldebrink	37 – 4 January 1988	1.75 m (5 ft 9 in)	Hozono Jairis	(Spain)
PG	7	Klara Lundquist	25 – 28 August 1999	1.73 m (5 ft 8 in)	Uni Girona CB	(Spain)
F	8	Ellen Nyström (C)	31 – 15 September 1993	1.85 m (6 ft 1 in)	Basket Saragossa 2002	(Spain)
G	12	Matilda Ekh	23 – 19 April 2002	1.82 m (6 ft 0 in)	Virginia Tech Hokies	(United States)
C	14	Louice Halvarsson	36 – 15 January 1989	1.91 m (6 ft 3 in)	CD Ibaeta	(Spain)
F	19	Tilda Trygger	19 – 12 February 2006	1.98 m (6 ft 6 in)	NC State Wolfpack	(United States)
C	22	Emma Johansson	21 – 28 August 2003	1.90 m (6 ft 3 in)	California Baptist Lancers	(United States)
C	38	Precious Johnson	25 – 1 March 2000	1.90 m (6 ft 3 in)	Megbízási Szerzödés	(Hungary)
PF	51	Fanny Wadling	28 – 23 May 1997	1.86 m (6 ft 1 in)	Luleå Basket	(Sweden)

Head coach

- (Sweden) Kevin Taylor Lundgren

Assistant coach(es)

- (Sweden) Robin Sandberg

Legend

- (C) Team captain
- Club – describes last
  club before the tournament
- Age – describes age
  on 18 June 2025

== See also ==
- Sweden women's national under-18 basketball team
- Sweden women's national under-16 basketball team
