= Johannah Leedham =

British basketball player (born 1987)

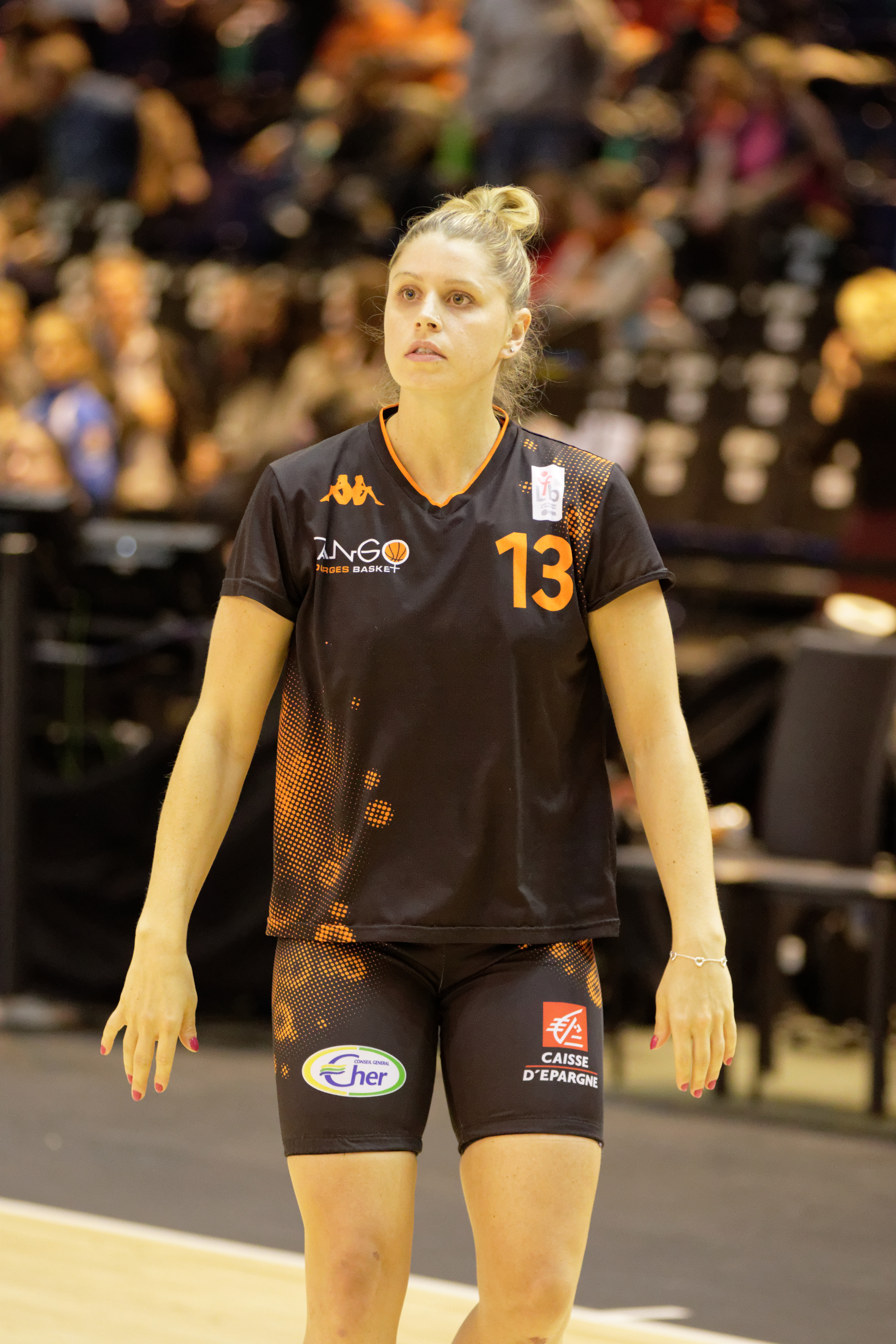

London Lions
- Position: Small forward
- League: WBBL

Personal information
- Born: 5 December 1987 (age 38) Ellesmere Port, England
- Listed height: 1.80 m (5 ft 11 in)

Career information
- High school: Cheshire Academy (Cheshire, Connecticut)
- College: Franklin Pierce (2006–2010)
- WNBA draft: 2010: 3rd round, 27th overall pick
- Drafted by: Connecticut Sun
- Playing career: 2010–present

Career history
- 2010: Gorzow Wielkopolski
- 2011–2012: Bulleen Boomers
- 2013–2017: CJM Bourges Basket
- 2017–present: ESB Villeneuve-d'Ascq
- Stats at Basketball Reference

Johannah Leedham-Warner (born 12 May 1987) is a British basketball player for Great Britain women's national basketball team and for French club ESB Villeneuve-d'Ascq.

== Early life and college career ==
She was born in Ellesmere Port, Cheshire and started playing basketball at the age of 13. Her father encouraged this new interest, putting a net up on the outside of their house. Jo played with the Ellesmere Port Panthers before gaining a place at Cheshire Academy High School, Connecticut (while playing for them she was New England Prep School Player of the Year in 2005), and, subsequently, Franklin Pierce University in Rindge, New Hampshire, where she became the leading all-time scorer in NCAA Division II with 3050 points.

== Professional career ==
In April 2010, Jo was drafted by the WNBA's Connecticut Sun and made her professional debut with Polish club Gorzow. She has spent the 2011-12 campaign in Australia, playing in the WNBL for the national champions Bulleen Boomers under GB head coach Tom Maher. She is part of the squad for the 2012 Summer Olympics. In February 2013 she signed a rookie contract to play for the Connecticut Sun of the WNBA but was ultimately waived on 23 May 2013. In 2013, she signed a two-year deal with Bourges in France and in 2017 joined ESBVA.
