= Marta Xargay =

Spanish basketball player (born 1990)

Personal information
- Born: 20 December 1990 (age 35) Girona, Spain
- Listed height: 5 ft 11 in (1.80 m)
- Listed weight: 157 lb (71 kg)

Career information
- Playing career: 2009–2020
- Position: Shooting guard
- Number: 10

Career history
- 1996–2003: C.E. Vedruna (youth)
- 2003–2005: C.E.S.E.T. (youth)
- 2005–2009: Uni Girona CB
- 2009–2015: CB Avenida
- 2015–2016: Phoenix Mercury
- 2015–2018: USK Praha
- 2018–2019: Dynamo Kursk
- 2020: Uni Girona CB

Career highlights
- EuroLeague champion (2011); 2× Spanish League champion (2011, 2013); 3× Spanish Cup champion (2012, 2014, 2015); 3× Czech League champion (2016–2018)
- Stats at Basketball Reference

Marta Xargay Casademont (born 20 December 1990) is a Spanish retired professional basketball player. She played for Phoenix Mercury of the WNBA, and for several European teams in Czech Republic, Russia and Spain. She played for the Spain women's national basketball team from 2011 to 2020. She won EuroLeague Women 2010–11 with Perfumerías Avenida Baloncesto. She left Spain in 2015, joining both USK Praha of the Czech League in 2015 and the Phoenix Mercury of the WNBA on 11 February 2015. In September 2018, she signed for Dynamo Kursk of the Russian Premier League and in January 2020, she returned to her youth club Uni Girona CB. After not playing in the 2020-21 season, she announced her retirement in July 2021.

== Club career ==
Xargay started playing basketball from a young age in clubs in her hometown Girona, entering the youth levels of Uni Girona CB at 14 and making it to the senior team and the Spanish second tier. In 2009 she signed for CB Avenida from Salamanca, where in the following six seasons she won two leagues, three cups and one EuroLeague.

During 2015 and 2016, she played both in the WNBA with Phoenix Mercury and the European season with USK Praha, where she won the 2016, 2017 and 2018 Czech League. Due to her commitment to the Spain national team, she opted not to play in the WNBA in 2017 or 2018. She played for one and a half seasons in Russian team Dynamo Kursk, before returning to Uni Girona CB in January 2020.

== National team ==
Xargay started playing with Spain's youth teams at 16, winning a total of five medals from 2006 to 2010. She made her debut with the senior team in 2011 and up to her last game in 2020, she had 147 caps and 9,2 PPG, participating in the Rio 2016 Olympics, two World Championships and five European Championships:

- 2006 FIBA Europe Under-16 Championship (youth)
- 2007 FIBA Europe Under-18 Championship (youth)
- 5th 2008 FIBA Europe Under-18 Championship (youth)
- 2009 FIBA Europe Under-20 Championship (youth)
- 2009 FIBA Under-19 World Championship (youth) (MVP)
- 2010 FIBA Europe Under-20 Championship (youth)
- 9th 2011 Eurobasket
- 2013 Eurobasket
- 2014 World Championship
- 2015 Eurobasket
- 2016 Summer Olympics
- 2017 Eurobasket
- 2018 World Championship
- 2019 Eurobasket

== Personal life ==
Xargay is married to WNBA star Breanna Stewart. The couple got engaged in May 2021 in Papago Park, Phoenix, AZ. On 6 July 2021 the couple married on the rooftop of Stewart’s apartment building. In August 2021, the couple’s first child, Ruby Mae Stewart Xargay, was born in Idaho via surrogacy. In May 2023, the couple announced via Instagram that Xargay was pregnant with their second child. In October 2023, the couple's second child, Theo Josep Stewart Xargay, was born.

== Career statistics ==
Legend
GP	Games played	GS	Games started	MPG	Minutes per game	RPG	Rebounds per game
APG	Assists per game	SPG	Steals per game	BPG	Blocks per game	PPG	Points per game
TO	Turnovers per game	FG%	Field-goal percentage	3P%	3-point field-goal percentage	FT%	Free-throw percentage
**Bold**	Career best	°	League leader

=== WNBA ===
==== Regular season ====
Year	Team	GP	GS	MPG	FG%	3P%	FT%	RPG	APG	SPG	BPG	TO	PPG
2015	Phoenix	**20**	**8**	17.5	.392	**.375**	**.733**	**1.8**	2.4	.5	**.2**	2.1	3.9
2016	Phoenix	15	6	**19.7**	**.400**	.333	.706	1.7	**2.7**	**1.1**	**.2**	**1.8**	**5.7**
Career	2 years, 1 team	35	14	18.4	.396	.349	.719	1.7	2.5	.7	.2	2.0	4.7

==== Playoffs ====
Year	Team	GP	GS	MPG	FG%	3P%	FT%	RPG	APG	SPG	BPG	TO	PPG
2015	Phoenix	4	4	23.3	.400	**.400**	**1.000**	**3.8**	2.3	.3	.0	**1.8**	6.0
2016	Phoenix	**5**	**5**	**24.2**	**.444**	.273	.800	1.8	**2.8**	**.4**	.0	2.6	**7.8**
Career	2 years, 1 team	9	9	23.8	.429	.313	.880	2.7	3.1	.3	.0	2.2	7.0

=== EuroLeague and EuroCup statistics ===
EuroLeague winner

Season	Team	GP	MPP	PPP	RPP	APP
2009–10 EuroLeague	(Spain) Halcón Avenida	13	10.5	2.0	1.0	1.2
2010–11 EuroLeague	(Spain) Halcón Avenida	17	13.7	3.5	1.3	0.9
2011–12 EuroLeague	(Spain) Perfumerías Avenida	14	25.1	6.0	3.0	2.7
2012–13 EuroLeague	(Spain) Perfumerías Avenida	14	26.1	7.9	3.1	2.9
2013–14 EuroLeague	(Spain) Perfumerías Avenida	13	30.9	8.5	4.2	4.7
2014–15 EuroLeague	(Spain) Perfumerías Avenida	16	28.1	8.1	3.6	3.2
2015–16 EuroLeague	(Czech Republic) ZVVZ USK Praha	17	19.7	4.9	2.1	2.0
2016–17 EuroLeague	(Czech Republic) ZVVZ USK Praha	19	30.8	11.0	3.3	3.4
2017–18 EuroLeague	(Czech Republic) ZVVZ USK Praha	15	36.0	14.7	3.7	7.3
2018–19 EuroLeague	(Russia) Dynamo Kursk	17	20.9	5.1	1.9	3.1
2019–20 EuroLeague	(Russia) Dynamo Kursk	8	24.6	4.0	2.9	2.5
2019–20 EuroLeague	(Spain) Spar CityLift Girona	6	21.4	7.3	2.7	2.7
