= Milica Jovanović =

Montenegrin basketball player

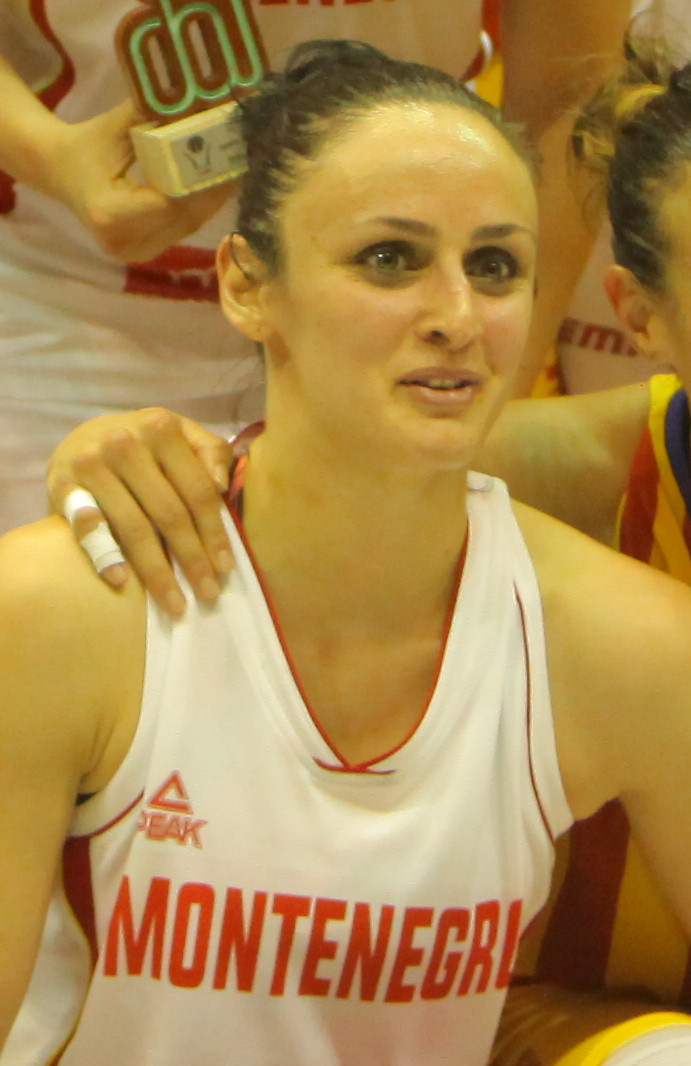

DVTK
- Position: Center
- League: Basketligan dam EuroCup Women

Personal information
- Born: 14 August 1989 (age 37) Nikšić, Yugoslavia
- Listed height: 1.89 m (6 ft 2 in)

Career information
- WNBA draft: 2011: undrafted

Career history
- Diósgyőri VTK
- 2007–2008: Cestistica Spezzina
- 2008–2009: Budućnost Podgorica
- 2009–2010: CB Olesa
- 2010–2012: Liomatic Umbertide
- 2012–2013: Beşiktaş JK
- 2013–2014: Orduspor
- 2014–2015: Adana ASKI
- 2015–2016: Botaş SK
- 2016–2017: Olympiacos
Medals
Women's basketball
Representing Serbia and Montenegro
European U16 Championship
Silver medal – second place	2004 Italy	Team
Representing Montenegro
Games of the Small States of Europe
Gold medal – first place	2025 Andorra	Team

Milica Jovanović (born 14 August 1989) is a Montenegrin female basketball player, currently playing for Luleå Basket in Basketligan dam.

In the 2008–2009 season, she played for Buducnost Podgorica, which won the Montenegrin League Championship.

In the 2020–2021 season in Turkey, she played for Izmit Belediyespor, with 11.6 points including 45.7% 3-pointers, 4 rebounds and 1.3 assists for 10.1 rating in 28 minutes in 7 Euroleague games. In 2021, she signed with Nantes Rezé
