= Great Britain women's national basketball team =

Great Britain
- FIBA ranking: 24 (14 September 2026)
- Joined FIBA: 2005
- FIBA zone: FIBA Europe
- National federation: British Basketball
- Coach: Anna Montañana

Olympic Games
- Appearances: 1

EuroBasket
- Appearances: 7
| Home | Away |

The Great Britain women's national basketball team, also known as GB Basketball, represents Great Britain in international women's basketball. The current governing body for the Great Britain team was formed by the national basketball organisations of England (Basketball England), Scotland (Basketball Scotland) and Wales (Basketball Wales) on 1 December 2005 in order to provide a competitive team for international competition. This structure does not include the basketball association of Northern Ireland; Northern Irish players normally represent the Ireland women's national basketball team, though they are also eligible to compete for Great Britain and Northern Ireland at the Olympic Games.

== Tournament record ==
=== Summer Olympics ===
- 2012 – 11th place

=== EuroBasket ===
- 2011 – 9th place
- 2013 – 9th place
- 2015 – 20th place
- 2019 – 4th place
- 2023 – 10th place
- 2025 – 14th place

== Current roster ==
Roster for the EuroBasket Women 2025.

Great Britain women's national basketball team roster
Players
Coaches

| Pos. | No. | Name | Age – Date of birth | Height | Club | Ctr. |
|---|---|---|---|---|---|---|
| SG | 2 | Hannah Jump | 24 – 8 January 2001 | 1.80 m (5 ft 11 in) | Botaş SK | (Turkey) |
| F | 5 | Cheridene Green | 29 – 19 September 1995 | 1.90 m (6 ft 3 in) | London Lions | (United Kingdom) |
| G | 7 | Holly Winterburn | 24 – 1 October 2000 | 1.80 m (5 ft 11 in) | Beşiktaş JK | (Turkey) |
| PG | 9 | Shanice Beckford-Norton | 28 – 28 May 1997 | 1.73 m (5 ft 8 in) | Oaklands Wolves | (United Kingdom) |
| G | 10 | Kitty Henderson | 22 – 24 August 2002 | 1.78 m (5 ft 10 in) | Columbia University | (United States) |
| PF | 12 | Savannah Wilkinson | 26 – 31 October 1998 | 1.78 m (5 ft 10 in) | Elitzur Holon | (Israel) |
| C | 14 | Temi Fagbenle (C) | 32 – 8 September 1992 | 1.93 m (6 ft 4 in) | Golden State Valkyries | (United States) |
| G | 17 | Hannah Robb | 27 – 28 April 1998 | 1.75 m (5 ft 9 in) | Caledonia Gladiators | (United Kingdom) |
| G | 20 | Shauna Harrison | 25 – 26 May 2000 | 1.80 m (5 ft 11 in) | Sheffield Hatters | (United Kingdom) |
| PF | 25 | Kirsty Brown | 25 – 26 August 1999 | 1.90 m (6 ft 3 in) | Caledonia Gladiators | (United Kingdom) |
| G | 30 | Sam Ashby | 24 – 22 March 2001 | 1.85 m (6 ft 1 in) | Oaklands Wolves | (United Kingdom) |
| G | 43 | Katie Januszewska | 21 – 28 May 2004 | 1.83 m (6 ft 0 in) | Leicester Riders | (United Kingdom) |

Head coach

- (Spain) Anna Montañana

Assistant coach(es)

- (Spain) Iñigo Nuñez

Legend

- (C) Team captain
- Club – describes last
  club before the tournament
- Age – describes age
  on 18 June 2025
