= EuroBasket Women 2021 final round =

The final round of the EuroBasket Women 2021 took place between 21 and 27 June 2021.

== Qualified teams ==
The group winners qualified for the quarterfinals while the second-and third placed teams advanced to the qualification round.

Group	Winners	Runners-up	Third place
A	Belarus	Spain	Sweden
B	Serbia	Italy	Montenegro
C	Belgium	Bosnia and Herzegovina	Slovenia
D	France	Russia	Croatia

== Bracket ==
Qualification to quarterfinals
21 June – Valencia
Italy	46
Sweden	64
21 June – Strasbourg
Bosnia and Herzegovina	80
Croatia	69
21 June – Valencia
Spain	78
Montenegro	51
21 June – Strasbourg
Russia	93
Slovenia	75

Quarterfinals
23 June – Valencia
Belarus	58
Sweden	46
23 June – Strasbourg
France	80
Bosnia and Herzegovina	67
23 June – Valencia
Serbia (OT)	71
Spain	64
23 June – Strasbourg
Belgium	85
Russia	83

Semifinals
26 June – Valencia
Belarus	61
France	73
26 June – Valencia
Serbia	74
Belgium	73

Final
27 June – Valencia
France	54
Serbia	63
Third place game
27 June – Valencia
Belarus	69
Belgium	77

Class. games to WWCQTs

Class. game to WWCQTs
26 June – Valencia
Sweden	63
Bosnia and Herzegovina	82

Class. game to WWCQTs
26 June – Valencia
Spain	74
Russia	78

== Qualification to quarterfinals ==
=== Italy vs Sweden ===
21 June 2021
18:00

Boxscore

Italy	46–64	Sweden
Scoring by quarter: 11–19, 9–11, 17–15, 9–19
Pts: Zandalasini 19; Rebs: Carangelo 5 Asts: Cinili 3		Pts: F. Eldebrink 22; Rebs: Loyd 8 Asts: E. Eldebrink 6

Pavelló Municipal Font de Sant Lluís, Valencia
Attendance: 317
Referees: Martin Horozov (BUL), Özlem Yalman (TUR), Geert Jacobs (BEL)

=== Bosnia and Herzegovina vs Croatia ===
21 June 2021
18:00

Boxscore

Bosnia and Herzegovina	80–69	Croatia
Scoring by quarter: 19–18, 14–18, 19–14, 28–19
Pts: Jones 24; Rebs: Jones 17; Asts: Babić 6		Pts: Dojkić 22; Rebs: Begić 9 Asts: Slonjšak 5

Rhénus Sport, Strasbourg
Attendance: 532
Referees: Maj Forsberg (DEN), Viola Györgyi (NOR), Gvidas Gedvilas (LTU)

=== Russia vs Slovenia ===
21 June 2021
20:45

Boxscore

Russia	93–75	Slovenia
Scoring by quarter: 28–13, 21–16, 25–25, 19–21
Pts: Komarova 20; Rebs: Musina 14; Asts: Goldyreva, Levchenko 7		Pts: Evans 21; Rebs: Evans 8 Asts: Oblak 7

Rhénus Sport, Strasbourg
Attendance: 748
Referees: Apostolos Kalpakas (SWE), Gatis Saliņš (LAT), Marek Kúkelčík (SVK)

=== Spain vs Montenegro ===
21 June 2021
21:00

Boxscore

Spain	78–51	Montenegro
Scoring by quarter: 26–18, 19–9, 21–14, 12–10
Pts: Conde 19; Rebs: Gil 8 Asts: Ouviña 7		Pts: three players 10; Rebs: Gatling, Pašić 6 Asts: Dubljević 3

Pavelló Municipal Font de Sant Lluís, Valencia
Attendance: 2,680
Referees: Amy Bonner (USA), Wojciech Liszka (POL), Thomas Bissuel (FRA)

== Quarterfinals ==
=== Belarus vs Sweden ===
23 June 2021
18:00

Boxscore

Belarus	58–46	Sweden
Scoring by quarter: 15–10, 11–4, 19–17, 13–15
Pts: Papova 18; Rebs: Papova 11; Asts: Papova 4		Pts: F. Eldebrink 11; Rebs: E. Eldebrink 9 Asts: E. Eldebrink 6

Pavelló Municipal Font de Sant Lluís, Valencia
Attendance: 486
Referees: Thomas Bissuel (FRA), Jelena Tomić (CRO), Blaž Zupančič (SLO)

=== France vs Bosnia and Herzegovina ===
23 June 2021
18:00

Boxscore

France	80–67	Bosnia and Herzegovina
Scoring by quarter: 18–16, 21–15, 24–16, 17–20
Pts: Gruda, Johannès 15; Rebs: Michel, Williams 6 Asts: three players 5		Pts: Jones 29; Rebs: Jones 24; Asts: Tavić 5

Rhénus Sport, Strasbourg
Attendance: 2,500
Referees: Apostolos Kalpakas (SWE), Esperanza Mendoza (ESP), Andrei Sharapa (BLR)

=== Belgium vs Russia ===
23 June 2021
20:45

Boxscore

Belgium	85–83	Russia
Scoring by quarter: 21–20, 22–17, 20–21, 22–25
Pts: Meesseman 33; Rebs: Meesseman 11; Asts: Delaere 8		Pts: Vadeeva 30; Rebs: Vadeeva 7 Asts: Vadeeva 5

Rhénus Sport, Strasbourg
Attendance: 1,668
Referees: Maj Forsberg (DEN), Gatis Saliņš (LAT), Radomir Vojinović (MNE)

=== Serbia vs Spain ===
23 June 2021
21:00

Boxscore

Serbia	71–64 (OT)	Spain
Scoring by quarter: 13–15, 10–12, 20–16, 19–19, Overtime: 9–2
Pts: Vasić 19; Rebs: Jovanović 10; Asts: Vasić 4		Pts: Ouviña 14; Rebs: Gil 9 Asts: Domínguez 4

Pavelló Municipal Font de Sant Lluís, Valencia
Attendance: 2,522
Referees: Amy Bonner (USA), Martin Horozov (BUL), Wojciech Liszka (POL)

== Classification games ==
=== Sweden vs Bosnia and Herzegovina ===
26 June 2021
12:00

Boxscore

Sweden	63–82	Bosnia and Herzegovina
Scoring by quarter: 10–25, 21–30, 19–11, 13–16
Pts: E. Eldebrink 14; Rebs: Johansson 6 Asts: F. Eldebrink 6		Pts: Jones 34; Rebs: Jones 19; Asts: Babić 7

Pavelló Municipal Font de Sant Lluís, Valencia
Attendance: 451
Referees: Özlem Yalman (TUR), Andrei Sharapa (BLR), Gatis Saliņš (LAT)

=== Spain vs Russia ===
26 June 2021
15:00

Boxscore

Spain	74–78	Russia
Scoring by quarter: 17–12, 16–18, 14–19, 27–29
Pts: Cazorla 19; Rebs: Gil 6 Asts: Ouviña 6		Pts: Musina 20; Rebs: Vadeeva 10; Asts: Levchenko 9

Pavelló Municipal Font de Sant Lluís, Valencia
Attendance: 2,719
Referees: Amy Bonner (USA), Thomas Bissuel (FRA), Blaž Zupančič (SLO)

== Semifinals ==
=== Belarus vs France ===
26 June 2021
18:00

Boxscore

Belarus	61–73	France
Scoring by quarter: 18–20, 12–18, 17–19, 14–16
Pts: Bentley 23; Rebs: Verameyenka 13; Asts: Tarasava 5		Pts: Miyem 24; Rebs: Gruda 10; Asts: Johannès 7

Pavelló Municipal Font de Sant Lluís, Valencia
Attendance: 1,215
Referees: Viola Györgyi (NOR), Martin Horozov (BUL), Wojciech Liszka (POL)

=== Serbia vs Belgium ===
26 June 2021
21:00

Boxscore

Serbia	74–73	Belgium
Scoring by quarter: 23–17, 9–19, 22–19, 20–18
Pts: Vasić 16; Rebs: Vasić 8 Asts: Škorić 4		Pts: Allemand 18; Rebs: Meesseman 7 Asts: Delaere 8

Pavelló Municipal Font de Sant Lluís, Valencia
Attendance: 1,425
Referees: Maj Forsberg (DEN), Apostolos Kalpakas (SWE), Gvidas Gedvilas (LTU)

== Third place game ==
27 June 2021
18:00

Boxscore

Belarus	69–77	Belgium
Scoring by quarter: 13–23, 17–17, 19–21, 20–16
Pts: Verameyenka 15; Rebs: Papova 12; Asts: Papova 8		Pts: Meesseman 21; Rebs: Meesseman 10; Asts: Allemand, Meesseman 5

Pavelló Municipal Font de Sant Lluís, Valencia
Attendance: 1,245
Referees: Viola Györgyi (NOR), Martin Horozov (BUL), Thomas Bissuel (FRA)

== Final ==
27 June 2021
21:00

Boxscore

France	54–63	Serbia
Scoring by quarter: 11–14, 15–17, 14–17, 14–15
Pts: Vukosavljević 15; Rebs: three players 5 Asts: Williams 5		Pts: Anderson 18; Rebs: Krajišnik 13; Asts: Vasić 6

Pavelló Municipal Font de Sant Lluís, Valencia
Attendance: 2,376
Referees: Maj Forsberg (DEN), Gvidas Gedvilas (LTU), Wojciech Liszka (POL)
