= EuroBasket Women 2021 final =

EuroBasket Women 2021 Final
Serbia	France
	1	2	3	4	Total
Serbia	14	17	17	15	63
France	11	15	14	14	54
- Date: 27 June 2021
- Venue: Pavelló Municipal Font de Sant Lluís, Valencia
- Attendance: 2,376

The 2021 FIBA Women's EuroBasket final was played at the Pavelló Municipal Font de Sant Lluís in Valencia, Spain, on 27 June 2021. Serbia won their second title winning 63–54 in the final.

== Road to the final ==
France
Round
Serbia
Opponent
Result

Opponent
Result
Croatia
105–63
Game 1
Italy
86–81 (OT)
Czech Republic
71–51
Game 2
Greece
85–51
Russia
85–59
Game 3
Montenegro
87–75

Pos	Team	Pld	Pts
1	France (H)	3	6
2	Russia	3	5
3	Croatia	3	4
4	Czech Republic	3	3

Source: FIBA
(H) Hosts
First round

Pos	Team	Pld	Pts
1	Serbia	3	6
2	Italy	3	5
3	Montenegro	3	4
4	Greece	3	3

Source: FIBA
Opponent
Result

Opponent
Result
Bye
Qual. for quarterfinals
Bye
Bosnia and Herzegovina
80–67
Quarterfinals
Spain
71–64 (OT)
Belarus
71–61
Semifinals
Belgium
74–73

== Match details ==
27 June 2021
21:00

Boxscore

France	54–63	Serbia
Scoring by quarter: 11–14, 15–17, 14–17, 14–15
Pts: Vukosavljević 15; Rebs: three players 5 Asts: Williams 5		Pts: Anderson 18; Rebs: Krajišnik 13; Asts: Vasić 6

Pavelló Municipal Font de Sant Lluís, Valencia
Attendance: 2,376
Referees: Maj Forsberg (DEN), Gvidas Gedvilas (LTU), Wojciech Liszka (POL)

Starters:			Pts	Reb	Ast
PG	39	Alix Duchet	0	0	1
SG	23	Marine Johannès	13	4	2
SF	11	Valériane Vukosavljević	15	5	1
PF	5	Endéné Miyem	2	4	0
C	7	Sandrine Gruda	5	4	2
Reserves:					
PG	0	Olivia Époupa	0	0	0
PF	6	Alexia Chartereau	6	5	0
C	8	Héléna Ciak	2	5	0
SG	10	Sarah Michel	6	2	2
C	12	Iliana Rupert	DNP		
G/F	15	Gabby Williams	5	3	5
SF	93	Diandra Tchatchouang	DNP		
Head coach:
Valérie Garnier

France	Serbia

France	Statistics	Serbia
10/32 (31.2%)	2-pt field goals	18/43 (41.9%)
8/21 (38.1%)	3-pt field goals	7/18 (38.9%)
10/12 (83.3%)	Free throws	6/8 (75%)
6	Offensive rebounds	5
32	Defensive rebounds	29
38	Total rebounds	34
13	Assists	14
19	Turnovers	9
3	Steals	9
2	Blocks	2
13	Fouls	17

Starters:			Pts	Reb	Ast
SG	23	Ana Dabović	9	0	1
SF	5	Sonja Vasić	12	8	6
PF	9	Jelena Brooks	15	5	0
PF	11	Aleksandra Crvendakić	0	2	0
C	33	Tina Krajišnik	2	13	2
Reserves:					
SG	6	Saša Čađo	0	1	1
SG	8	Nevena Jovanović	3	0	0
PG	10	Dajana Butulija	DNP		
PG	12	Yvonne Anderson	18	1	4
PF	24	Maja Škorić	2	1	0
SF	25	Maša Janković	DNP		
PF	32	Angela Dugalić	2	1	0
Head coach:
Marina Maljković
