= EuroBasket Women 2021 =

2021 edition of the FIBA EuroBasket Women

Championnat d'Europe féminin de basket-ball 2021 Campeonato Europeo de Baloncesto Femenino de 2021

Tournament details
- Host country: France; Spain
- City: Strasbourg; Valencia
- Dates: 17–27 June
- Teams: 16 (from 1 confederation)
- Venues: 2 (in 2 host cities)

Final positions
- Champions: Serbia (2nd title)
- Runners-up: France
- Third place: Belgium
- Fourth place: Belarus

Tournament statistics
- Games played: 38
- Attendance: 46,590 (1,226 per game)
- MVP: (Serbia) Sonja Vasić
- Top scorer: (Bosnia and Herzegovina) Jonquel Jones (24.3 points per game)

Official website
- Website

The 2021 European Women Basketball Championship, commonly called EuroBasket Women 2021, was the 38th edition of the continental tournament in women's basketball, sanctioned by the FIBA Europe. It was co-hosted by Strasbourg, France and Valencia, Spain from 17 to 27 June 2021. It was the third time the tournament was hosted by multiple countries. The tournament also served as part of European qualification for the 2022 FIBA Women's Basketball World Cup, with the top six nations advancing to the qualifying tournaments. The final were planned to be held at the AccorHotels Arena in Paris but moved to the Pavelló Municipal Font de San Lluís, in Valencia.

Spain was the defending champion. Serbia won their second title winning 63–54 in the final over France, while Belgium won the bronze medal, after defeating Belarus.

== Host selection ==
FIBA Europe announced on 18 April 2019 that four national federations have applied two bids to organize FIBA Women's EuroBasket 2021:

- France / Spain
- Sweden / Ukraine

France and Spain were selected as co-hosts on 15 July 2019 at the Central Board in Munich, Germany.

Not in the final shortlist:

- Belgium / Portugal

== Qualification ==
Russia initially received a four-year ban from all major sporting events by the World Anti-Doping Agency on 9 December 2019, after RUSADA was found non-compliant for handing over manipulated laboratory data to investigators. However, the Russian women's team could still enter qualification, as the ban only applies to the Women's Basketball World Cup. Despite that, a team representing Russia, which uses its flag and anthem, is ineligible under the WADA decision. The decision was appealed to the Court of Arbitration for Sport, which ruled in favour of WADA but reduced the ban to two years, lasting until 16 December 2022. The CAS ruling also allowed the name "Russia" to be displayed on uniforms if the words "Neutral Athlete" or "Neutral Team" had equal prominence. If Russia qualifies for the tournament, its women's basketball players will not be able to use their country's name alone, flag or anthem at the Women's World Cup, like their male counterparts, as a result of the nation's two-year ban from world championships and other international sports events organised or sanctioned by a WADA signatory.

=== Qualified teams ===
Country	Qualified as	Date of qualification	Last appearance	Best placement in tournament	WR
France	Host nation	15 July 2019	2019	Champions (2001, 2009)	5th
Spain	Host nation	15 July 2019	2019	Champions (1993, 2013, 2017, 2019)	3rd
Belgium	Group G winner	14 November 2020	2019	Third place (2017)	6th
Serbia	Group E winner	11 December 2020	2019	Champions (2015)	8th
Sweden	Group B winner	11 December 2020	2019	Sixth place (2019)	20th
Bosnia and Herzegovina	Top 5 ranked of second-placed teams	4 February 2021	1999	Tenth place (1999)	34th
Croatia	Group I winner	4 February 2021	2015	Fifth place (2011)	31st
Slovenia	Group A winner	4 February 2021	2019	Tenth place (2019)	30th
Belarus	Group F winner	6 February 2021	2019	Third place (2007)	11th
Czech Republic	Group D winner	6 February 2021	2019	Champions (2005)	16th
Russia	Group C winner	6 February 2021	2019	Champions (2003, 2007, 2011)	12th
Slovakia	Group H winner	6 February 2021	2017	Runners-up (1997)	24th
Montenegro	Top 5 ranked of second-placed teams	6 February 2021	2019	Sixth place (2011)	22nd
Italy	Top 5 ranked of second-placed teams	6 February 2021	2019	Champions (1938)	14th
Turkey	Top 5 ranked of second-placed teams	6 February 2021	2019	Runners-up (2011)	7th
Greece	Top 5 ranked of second-placed teams	6 February 2021	2017	Fourth place (2017)	13th

== Venues ==
Originally, France was going to host the tournament at two venues - the Palais des Sports de Gerland in Lyon and the AccorHotels Arena in Paris which was supposed to host the final segment of the competition as well. However, on 11 May 2020, it was announced that Pavelló Municipal Font de San Lluís in Valencia would host pools A and B in the group stage as well as the finals, while on 18 Sep 2020, it was announced that Rhénus Sport in Strasbourg would host pools C and D.

(France) Strasbourg	(Spain) Valencia	EuroBasket Women 2021 is located in Europe
Rhénus Sport; Capacity: 6,200	Pavelló Municipal Font de Sant Lluís; Capacity: 9,000	EuroBasket Women 2021 is located in Europe

== Marketing ==
The official logo was unveiled on 28 January 2020. The visual identity focuses on the outlines of some of the most iconic basketball moves where the shapes come together to form the logo and its elements in the shape of the trophy and the year 2021. The logo was designed by the Lisbon-based agency VMLY&R Branding.

== Draw ==
The draw took place on 8 March 2021 in Valencia, Spain.

=== Seedings ===
The seeding was confirmed on 3 March 2021.

Pot 1	Pot 2	Pot 3	Pot 4
Spain (co-host); France (co-host); Serbia; Belgium	Sweden; Russia; Slovenia; Italy	Belarus; Czech Republic; Montenegro; Turkey	Slovakia; Croatia; Bosnia and Herzegovina; Greece

== Squads ==
All rosters consist of 12 players.

== Preliminary round ==
=== Group A ===
Pos	Team	Pld	W	L	PF	PA	PD	Pts	Qualification
1	Belarus	3	2	1	185	163	+22	5 (Note: Belarus 53–51 Spain)	Quarterfinals
2	Spain (H)	3	2	1	220	169	+51	5	Qualification for quarterfinals
3	Sweden	3	1	2	183	211	−28	4 (Note: Sweden 74–57 Slovakia)	Qualification for quarterfinals
4	Slovakia	3	1	2	176	221	−45	4	

Source: FIBA
Rules for classification: 1) Points; 2) Head-to-head results; 3) Points difference; 4) Points scored.
(H) Hosts
Notes:

17 June 2021
Sweden	74–57	Slovakia
Belarus	53–51	Spain
18 June 2021
Slovakia	58–54	Belarus
Spain	76–55	Sweden
20 June 2021
Sweden	54–78	Belarus
Spain	93–61	Slovakia

=== Group B ===
Pos	Team	Pld	W	L	PF	PA	PD	Pts	Qualification
1	Serbia	3	3	0	258	207	+51	6	Quarterfinals
2	Italy	3	2	1	235	214	+21	5	Qualification for quarterfinals
3	Montenegro	3	1	2	206	219	−13	4	Qualification for quarterfinals
4	Greece	3	0	3	173	232	−59	3	

Source: FIBA
Rules for classification: 1) Points; 2) Head-to-head results; 3) Points difference; 4) Points scored.

17 June 2021
Montenegro	70–55	Greece
Serbia	86–81 (OT)	Italy
18 June 2021
Greece	51–85	Serbia
Italy	77–61	Montenegro
20 June 2021
Montenegro	75–87	Serbia
Italy	77–67	Greece

=== Group C ===
Pos	Team	Pld	W	L	PF	PA	PD	Pts	Qualification
1	Belgium	3	2	1	210	188	+22	5 (Note: Belgium 1–1, +20 PD; Bosnia and Herzegovina 1–1, +5 PD; Slovenia 1–1, −25 PD)	Quarterfinals
2	Bosnia and Herzegovina	3	2	1	215	200	+15	5	Qualification for quarterfinals
3	Slovenia	3	2	1	220	220	0	5	Qualification for quarterfinals
4	Turkey	3	0	3	162	199	−37	3	

Source: FIBA
Rules for classification: 1) Points; 2) Head-to-head results; 3) Points difference; 4) Points scored.
Notes:

17 June 2021
Bosnia and Herzegovina	70–55	Belgium
Slovenia	72–47	Turkey
18 June 2021
Turkey	54–64	Bosnia and Herzegovina
Belgium	92–57	Slovenia
20 June 2021
Bosnia and Herzegovina	81–91	Slovenia
Turkey	61–63	Belgium

=== Group D ===
Pos	Team	Pld	W	L	PF	PA	PD	Pts	Qualification
1	France (H)	3	3	0	261	173	+88	6	Quarterfinals
2	Russia	3	2	1	205	216	−11	5	Qualification for quarterfinals
3	Croatia	3	1	2	209	234	−25	4	Qualification for quarterfinals
4	Czech Republic	3	0	3	176	228	−52	3	

Source: FIBA
Rules for classification: 1) Points; 2) Head-to-head results; 3) Points difference; 4) Points scored.
(H) Hosts

17 June 2021
Russia	73–69	Czech Republic
France	105–63	Croatia
18 June 2021
Croatia	62–73	Russia
Czech Republic	51–71	France
20 June 2021
Czech Republic	56–84	Croatia
France	85–59	Russia

== Knockout stage ==
=== Bracket ===
Qualification to quarterfinals
21 June – Valencia
Italy	46
Sweden	64
21 June – Strasbourg
Bosnia and Herzegovina	80
Croatia	69
21 June – Valencia
Spain	78
Montenegro	51
21 June – Strasbourg
Russia	93
Slovenia	75

Quarterfinals
23 June – Valencia
Belarus	58
Sweden	46
23 June – Strasbourg
France	80
Bosnia and Herzegovina	67
23 June – Valencia
Serbia (OT)	71
Spain	64
23 June – Strasbourg
Belgium	85
Russia	83

Semifinals
26 June – Valencia
Belarus	61
France	73
26 June – Valencia
Serbia	74
Belgium	73

Final
27 June – Valencia
France	54
Serbia	63
Third place game
27 June – Valencia
Belarus	69
Belgium	77

Class. games to WWCQTs

Class. game to WWCQTs
26 June – Valencia
Sweden	63
Bosnia and Herzegovina	82

Class. game to WWCQTs
26 June – Valencia
Spain	74
Russia	78

=== Final ===
27 June 2021
21:00

Boxscore

France	54–63	Serbia
Scoring by quarter: 11–14, 15–17, 14–17, 14–15
Pts: Vukosavljević 15; Rebs: three players 5 Asts: Williams 5		Pts: Anderson 18; Rebs: Krajišnik 13; Asts: Vasić 6

Pavelló Municipal Font de Sant Lluís, Valencia
Attendance: 2,376
Referees: Maj Forsberg (DEN), Gvidas Gedvilas (LTU), Wojciech Liszka (POL)

== Final ranking ==
Qualified for World Cup Qualifying Tournaments

Rank	Team	Record
1st place, gold medalist(s)	Serbia	6–0
2nd place, silver medalist(s)	France	5–1
3rd place, bronze medalist(s)	Belgium	4–2
4th	Belarus	3–3
Eliminated in the quarterfinals
5th	Bosnia and Herzegovina	4–2
6th	Russia	4–2
7th	Spain	3–3
8th	Sweden	2–4
Eliminated in the qualification for quarterfinals
9th	Italy	2–2
10th	Slovenia	2–2
11th	Croatia	1–3
12th	Montenegro	1–3
Eliminated in the first round
13th	Slovakia	1–2
14th	Turkey	0–3
15th	Czech Republic	0–3
16th	Greece	0–3

FIBA Women's EuroBasket 2021 Champions

Serbia
2nd title

Team roster: Sonja Vasić, Saša Čađo, Nevena Jovanović, Jelena Brooks, Dajana Butulija, Aleksandra Crvendakić, Yvonne Anderson, Ana Dabović, Maja Škorić, Maša Janković, Angela Dugalić, Tina Krajišnik
Head coach: Marina Maljković

== Statistics and awards ==
=== Statistical leaders ===
==== Players ====
Points

Name	PPG
(Bosnia and Herzegovina) Jonquel Jones	24.3
(Belgium) Emma Meesseman	20.7
(Croatia) Ivana Dojkić	20.3
(Russia) Maria Vadeeva	18.5
(Slovenia) Eva Lisec	17.3

Rebounds

Name	RPG
(Bosnia and Herzegovina) Jonquel Jones	16.8
(Bosnia and Herzegovina) Marica Gajić	10.3
(Russia) Raisa Musina	10.0
(Belarus) Maryia Papova	10.0
(Belarus) Anastasiya Verameyenka	9.3

Assists

Name	APG
(Montenegro) Božica Mujović	7.0
(Slovenia) Teja Oblak	6.8
(Slovakia) Nikola Dudášová	6.7
(Sweden) Elin Eldebrink	5.5
(Belgium) Julie Allemand	5.3

Blocks

Name	BPG
(Belarus) Anastasiya Verameyenka	1.7
(Bosnia and Herzegovina) Jonquel Jones	1.5
(Czech Republic) Alena Hanušová	1.3
(Belgium) Emma Meesseman	1.0
(Turkey) Quanitra Hollingsworth	1.0

Steals

Name	SPG
(Czech Republic) Veronika Voráčková	3.0
(Serbia) Tina Krajišnik	2.8
(Croatia) Ivana Dojkić	2.8
(Belgium) Kim Mestdagh	2.7
(Bosnia and Herzegovina) Marica Gajić	2.5

Efficiency

Name	EFFPG
(Bosnia and Herzegovina) Jonquel Jones	33.5
(Belgium) Emma Meesseman	28.7
(Russia) Maria Vadeeva	22.2
(Belarus) Anastasiya Verameyenka	19.5
(Serbia) Sonja Vasić	19.2

==== Teams ====
Points

Team	PPG
France	78.0
Serbia	77.7
Russia	76.5
Belgium	74.2
Bosnia and Herzegovina	74.0

Rebounds

Team	RPG
France	44.3
Turkey	41.0
Bosnia and Herzegovina	40.3
Russia	40.3
Serbia	39.3

Assists

Team	APG
Belgium	22.2
Spain	21.5
France	20.5
Slovenia	19.5
Russia	19.2

Blocks

Team	BPG
Czech Republic	3.7
Belarus	3.3
Belgium	2.7
France	2.3
Greece	2.3
Spain	2.3

Steals

Team	SPG
Serbia	10.8
Spain	9.8
Italy	9.0
Slovenia	8.3
Belgium	7.8
Croatia	7.8

Efficiency

Team	EFFPG
France	95.5
Serbia	91.8
Belgium	89.5
Spain	88.2
Bosnia and Herzegovina	85.3

=== Awards ===
The All-Tournament team and MVP award was announced on 27 June 2021.

All-Star Team
Guard	Forwards	Centers
(Belgium) Julie Allemand	(France) Endéné Miyem (Belgium) Emma Meesseman (Serbia) Sonja Vasić	(Bosnia and Herzegovina) Jonquel Jones
MVP: (Serbia) Sonja Vasić
