= EuroBasket Women 2021 Group C =

Group C of the EuroBasket Women 2021 took place between 17 and 20 June 2021. The group consisted of Belgium, Bosnia and Herzegovina, Slovenia and Turkey and played its games at the Rhénus Sport in Strasbourg, France.

== Teams ==
Country	Qualified as	Date of qualification	Last appearance	Best placement in tournament	WR
Belgium	Group G winner	14 November 2020	2019	Third place (2017)	6th
Bosnia and Herzegovina	Top 5 ranked of second-placed teams	4 February 2021	1999	Tenth place (1999)	34th
Slovenia	Group A winner	4 February 2021	2019	Tenth place (2019)	30th
Turkey	Top 5 ranked of second-placed teams	6 February 2021	2019	Runners-up (2011)	7th

== Standings ==
Pos	Team	Pld	W	L	PF	PA	PD	Pts	Qualification
1	Belgium	3	2	1	210	188	+22	5 (Note: Belgium 1–1, +20 PD; Bosnia and Herzegovina 1–1, +5 PD; Slovenia 1–1, −25 PD)	Quarterfinals
2	Bosnia and Herzegovina	3	2	1	215	200	+15	5	Qualification for quarterfinals
3	Slovenia	3	2	1	220	220	0	5	Qualification for quarterfinals
4	Turkey	3	0	3	162	199	−37	3	

Source: FIBA
Rules for classification: 1) Points; 2) Head-to-head results; 3) Points difference; 4) Points scored.

== Matches ==
All times are local (UTC+2).

=== Bosnia and Herzegovina vs Belgium ===
17 June 2021
15:00

Boxscore

Bosnia and Herzegovina	70–55	Belgium
Scoring by quarter: 19−11, 11−17, 21−19, 19−8
Pts: Babić 23; Rebs: Jones 17; Asts: Tavić 6		Pts: Meesseman 24; Rebs: Meesseman 13; Asts: Meesseman 5

Rhénus Sport, Strasbourg
Attendance: 545
Referees: Viola Györgyi (NOR), Gatis Saliņš (LAT), Marek Kúkelčík (SVK)

=== Slovenia vs Turkey ===
17 June 2021
18:00

Boxscore

Slovenia	72–47	Turkey
Scoring by quarter: 19–16, 17–11, 17–15, 19–5
Pts: Lisec 17; Rebs: Evans 9 Asts: Oblak 6		Pts: Hollingsworth 16; Rebs: three players 5 Asts: Çakır 4

Rhénus Sport, Strasbourg
Attendance: 747
Referees: Maj Forsberg (DEN), Andrei Sharapa (BLR), Marek Kúkelčík (SVK)

=== Turkey vs Bosnia and Herzegovina ===
18 June 2021
12:00

Boxscore

Turkey	54–64	Bosnia and Herzegovina
Scoring by quarter: 8–17, 18–10, 18–11, 10–26
Pts: Gülcan 17; Rebs: Gülcan 14; Asts: Çakır 6		Pts: Jones 22; Rebs: Jones 15; Asts: three players 3

Rhénus Sport, Strasbourg
Attendance: 283
Referees: Maj Forsberg (DEN), Marek Kúkelčík (SVK), Esperanza Mendoza (ESP)

=== Belgium vs Slovenia ===
18 June 2021
15:00

Boxscore

Belgium	92–57	Slovenia
Scoring by quarter: 25–14, 30–15, 18–15, 19–13
Pts: Meesseman 23; Rebs: Mestdagh 6 Asts: Allemand 10		Pts: Lisec 11; Rebs: Seničar 9 Asts: Krošelj 4

Rhénus Sport, Strasbourg
Attendance: 743
Referees: Charalampos Karakatsounis (GRE), Bernard Vassallo (MLT), Mihkel Männiste (EST)

=== Bosnia and Herzegovina vs Slovenia ===
20 June 2021
12:00

Boxscore

Bosnia and Herzegovina	81–91	Slovenia
Scoring by quarter: 25–23, 12–31, 21–20, 23–17
Pts: Gajić 28; Rebs: Gajić 11; Asts: Tavić 6		Pts: Lisec 22; Rebs: Evans 10; Asts: Oblak 11

Rhénus Sport, Strasbourg
Attendance: 0
Referees: Gvidas Gedvilas (LTU), Andrei Sharapa (BLR), Mihkel Männiste (EST)

=== Turkey vs Belgium ===
20 June 2021
15:00

Boxscore

Turkey	61–63	Belgium
Scoring by quarter: 15–16, 16–25, 14–10, 16–12
Pts: Hollingsworth 16; Rebs: Bilgiç 8 Asts: Çakır 5		Pts: Meesseman 15; Rebs: Linskens 9 Asts: Meesseman, Linskens 3

Rhénus Sport, Strasbourg
Attendance: 1,253
Referees: Jasmina Juras (SRB), Radomir Vojinović (MNE), Marek Kúkelčík (SVK)
