= EuroBasket Women 2021 Group D =

Group D of the EuroBasket Women 2021 took place between 17 and 20 June 2021. The group consisted of Croatia, Czech Republic, France and Russia and played its games at the Rhénus Sport in Strasbourg, France.

== Teams ==
Country	Qualified as	Date of qualification	Last appearance	Best placement in tournament	WR
Croatia	Group I winner	4 February 2021	2015	Fifth place (2011)	31st
Czech Republic	Group D winner	6 February 2021	2019	Champions (2005)	16th
France	Host nation	15 July 2019	2019	Champions (2001, 2009)	5th
Russia	Group C winner	6 February 2021	2019	Champions (2003, 2007, 2011)	12th

== Standings ==
Pos	Team	Pld	W	L	PF	PA	PD	Pts	Qualification
1	France (H)	3	3	0	261	173	+88	6	Quarterfinals
2	Russia	3	2	1	205	216	−11	5	Qualification for quarterfinals
3	Croatia	3	1	2	209	234	−25	4	Qualification for quarterfinals
4	Czech Republic	3	0	3	176	228	−52	3	

Source: FIBA
Rules for classification: 1) Points; 2) Head-to-head results; 3) Points difference; 4) Points scored.
(H) Hosts

== Matches ==
All times are local (UTC+2).

=== Russia vs Czech Republic ===
17 June 2021
12:00

Boxscore

Russia	73–69	Czech Republic
Scoring by quarter: 16−14, 22−19, 22−18, 13−18
Pts: Vadeeva 27; Rebs: Vadeeva 16; Asts: Komarova 4		Pts: Hanušová 24; Rebs: Vyoralová 7 Asts: Vyoralová 5

Rhénus Sport, Strasbourg
Attendance: 304
Referees: Jasmina Juras (SRB), Radomir Vojinović (MNE), Andrada Csender (ROU)

=== France vs Croatia ===
17 June 2021
20:45

Boxscore

France	105–63	Croatia
Scoring by quarter: 26–25, 24–15, 29–12, 26–11
Pts: Miyem 18; Rebs: Vukosavljević 12; Asts: Duchet, Michel 6		Pts: Tikvić 12; Rebs: Tikvić 9 Asts: Tadić 3

Rhénus Sport, Strasbourg
Attendance: 1,908
Referees: Apostolos Kalpakas (SWE), Charalampos Karakatsounis (GRE), Esperanza Mendoza (ESP)

=== Croatia vs Russia ===
18 June 2021
18:00

Boxscore

Croatia	62–73	Russia
Scoring by quarter: 19−22, 14−14, 16−25, 13–12
Pts: Dojkić 25; Rebs: Cvitković 7 Asts: Tadić 3		Pts: Musina 19; Rebs: Musina 14; Asts: Vadeeva 6

Rhénus Sport, Strasbourg
Attendance: 1,002
Referees: Viola Györgyi (NOR), Gatis Saliņš (LAT), Silvia Marziali (ITA)

=== Czech Republic vs France ===
18 June 2021
20:45

Boxscore

Czech Republic	51–71	France
Scoring by quarter: 14–18, 15–14, 12–20, 10–19
Pts: Elhotová 13; Rebs: Vyoralová 6 Asts: Březinová, Vyoralová 3		Pts: Gruda 16; Rebs: Duchet, Miyem 7 Asts: Chartereau 4

Rhénus Sport, Strasbourg
Attendance: 2,200
Referees: Apostolos Kalpakas (SWE), Jasmina Juras (SRB), Gvidas Gedvilas (LTU)

=== Czech Republic vs Croatia ===
20 June 2021
18:00

Boxscore

Czech Republic	56–84	Croatia
Scoring by quarter: 22–27, 11–15, 12–30, 11–12
Pts: Stoupalová 10; Rebs: Vyoralová 6 Asts: Hejdová 4		Pts: Dojkić 24; Rebs: Begić 10; Asts: Dojkić 7

Rhénus Sport, Strasbourg
Attendance: 1,378
Referees: Apostolos Kalpakas (SWE), Gatis Saliņš (LAT), Esperanza Mendoza (ESP)

=== France vs Russia ===
20 June 2021
20:45

Boxscore

France	85–59	Russia
Scoring by quarter: 14–19, 20–4, 21–25, 30–11
Pts: Duchet 12; Rebs: Vukosavljević 9 Asts: Johannès 8		Pts: Komarova 10; Rebs: Musina 10; Asts: Levchenko 6

Rhénus Sport, Strasbourg
Attendance: 2,752
Referees: Maj Forsberg (DEN), Viola Györgyi (NOR), Maria Ignatiou (CYP)
