= EuroBasket Women 2021 Group A =

Group A of the EuroBasket Women 2021 took place between 17 and 20 June 2021. The group consisted of Belarus, Slovakia, Spain and Sweden and played its games at the Pavelló Municipal Font de Sant Lluís in Valencia, Spain.

== Teams ==
Country	Qualified as	Date of qualification	Last appearance	Best placement in tournament	WR
Spain	Host nation	15 July 2019	2019	Champions (1993, 2013, 2017, 2019)	3rd
Sweden	11 December 2020	Group B winner	2019	Fifth place (2019)	20th
Belarus	6 February 2021	Group F winner	2019	Third place (2007)	11th
Slovakia	6 February 2021	Group H winner	2017	Runners-up (1997)	24th

== Standings ==
Pos	Team	Pld	W	L	PF	PA	PD	Pts	Qualification
1	Belarus	3	2	1	185	163	+22	5 (Note: Belarus 53–51 Spain)	Quarterfinals
2	Spain (H)	3	2	1	220	169	+51	5	Qualification for quarterfinals
3	Sweden	3	1	2	183	211	−28	4 (Note: Sweden 74–57 Slovakia)	Qualification for quarterfinals
4	Slovakia	3	1	2	176	221	−45	4	

Source: FIBA
Rules for classification: 1) Points; 2) Head-to-head results; 3) Points difference; 4) Points scored.
(H) Hosts

== Matches ==
All times are local (UTC+2).

=== Sweden vs Slovakia ===
17 June 2021
12:00

Boxscore

Sweden	74–57	Slovakia
Scoring by quarter: 20−11, 13−13, 25−6, 16−27
Pts: F. Eldebrink 17; Rebs: Loyd 6 Asts: E. Eldebrink, F. Eldebrink 7		Pts: Jakubcová 17; Rebs: Jakubcová 8 Asts: Dudášová 6

Pavelló Municipal Font de Sant Lluís, Valencia
Attendance: 0
Referees: Elena Chernova (RUS), Blaž Zupančič (SLO), Mila Čavara (BIH)

=== Belarus vs Spain ===
17 June 2021
21:00

Boxscore

Belarus	53–51	Spain
Scoring by quarter: 14–9, 7–13, 14–11, 18–18
Pts: Papova 19; Rebs: Papova 13; Asts: Bentley 4		Pts: Ndour 15; Rebs: Gil 10; Asts: Domínguez, Rodríguez 3

Pavelló Municipal Font de Sant Lluís, Valencia
Attendance: 1,042
Referees: Jelena Tomić (CRO), Geert Jacobs (BEL), Alexandra Stan (ROU)

=== Slovakia vs Belarus ===
18 June 2021
18:00

Boxscore

Slovakia	58–54	Belarus
Scoring by quarter: 13–14, 15–12, 11–11, 19–17
Pts: Jakubcová 16; Rebs: Oroszová 7 Asts: Dudášová 9		Pts: Bentley 17; Rebs: Verameyenka 11; Asts: Bentley 4

Pavelló Municipal Font de Sant Lluís, Valencia
Attendance: 447
Referees: Sonia Teixeira (POR), Péter Praksch (HUN), Marion Ortis (FRA)

=== Spain vs Sweden ===
18 June 2021
21:00

Boxscore

Spain	76–55	Sweden
Scoring by quarter: 21–9, 26–8, 11–18, 18–20
Pts: Ndour 22; Rebs: Ndour 13; Asts: Palau 7		Pts: Nyström 11; Rebs: Loyd 4 Asts: E. Eldebrink 5

Pavelló Municipal Font de Sant Lluís, Valencia
Attendance: 1,503
Referees: Amy Bonner (USA), Martin Horozov (BUL), Blaž Zupančič (SLO)

=== Sweden vs Belarus ===
20 June 2021
15:00

Boxscore

Sweden	54–78	Belarus
Scoring by quarter: 18–25, 11–15, 13–17, 12–21
Pts: F. Eldebrink 13; Rebs: F. Eldebrink, Nyström 6 Asts: E. Eldebrink 4		Pts: Bentley 20; Rebs: Papova 12; Asts: Bentley 5

Pavelló Municipal Font de Sant Lluís, Valencia
Attendance: 427
Referees: Amy Bonner (USA), Jelena Tomić (CRO), Jan Baloun (CZE)

=== Spain vs Slovakia ===
20 June 2021
21:00

Boxscore

Spain	93–61	Slovakia
Scoring by quarter: 21–13, 18–19, 25–13, 29–16
Pts: Ouviña 17; Rebs: Gil 5 Asts: Domínguez 5		Pts: Páleníková 15; Rebs: Remenárová 6 Asts: Dudášová, Oroszová 4

Pavelló Municipal Font de Sant Lluís, Valencia
Attendance: 3,000
Referees: Wojciech Liszka (POL), Thomas Bissuel (FRA), Mila Čavara (BIH)
