= EuroBasket Women 2021 Group B =

Group B of the EuroBasket Women 2021 took place between 17 and 20 June 2021. The group consisted of Greece, Italy, Montenegro and Serbia and played its games at the Pavelló Municipal Font de Sant Lluís in Valencia, Spain.

== Teams ==
Country	Qualified as	Date of qualification	Last appearance	Best placement in tournament	WR
Greece	Top 5 ranked of second-placed teams	6 February 2021	2017	Fourth place (2017)	13th
Italy	Top 5 ranked of second-placed teams	6 February 2021	2019	Champions (1938)	14th
Montenegro	Top 5 ranked of second-placed teams	6 February 2021	2019	Sixth place (2011)	22nd
Serbia	Group E winner	11 December 2020	2019	Champions (2015)	8th

== Standings ==
Pos	Team	Pld	W	L	PF	PA	PD	Pts	Qualification
1	Serbia	3	3	0	258	207	+51	6	Quarterfinals
2	Italy	3	2	1	235	214	+21	5	Qualification for quarterfinals
3	Montenegro	3	1	2	206	219	−13	4	Qualification for quarterfinals
4	Greece	3	0	3	173	232	−59	3	

Source: FIBA
Rules for classification: 1) Points; 2) Head-to-head results; 3) Points difference; 4) Points scored.

== Matches ==
All times are local (UTC+2).

=== Montenegro vs Greece ===
17 June 2021
15:00

Boxscore

Montenegro	70–55	Greece
Scoring by quarter: 24−16, 20−13, 13−18, 13−8
Pts: Jovanović 19; Rebs: Jovanović 8 Asts: Mujović 8		Pts: Fasoula 21; Rebs: Nikolopoulou 6 Asts: Nikolopoulou 7

Pavelló Municipal Font de Sant Lluís, Valencia
Attendance: 888
Referees: Martin Horozov (BUL), Wojciech Liszka (POL), Péter Praksch (HUN)

=== Serbia vs Italy ===
17 June 2021
18:00

Boxscore

Serbia	86–81 (OT)	Italy
Scoring by quarter: 19–19, 18–20, 15–18, 22–17, Overtime: 12–7
Pts: Vasić 27; Rebs: Vasić 13; Asts: Vasić 7		Pts: Zandalasini 18; Rebs: Keys 9 Asts: Cubaj 5

Pavelló Municipal Font de Sant Lluís, Valencia
Attendance: 509
Referees: Amy Bonner (USA), Özlem Yalman (TUR), Thomas Bissuel (FRA)

=== Greece vs Serbia ===
18 June 2021
12:00

Boxscore

Greece	51–85	Serbia
Scoring by quarter: 13–17, 3–23, 21–25, 14–20
Pts: Spanou 10; Rebs: Fasoula 5 Asts: Sotiriou 4		Pts: Crvendakić 13; Rebs: Butulija 8 Asts: Dabović, Jovanović 3

Pavelló Municipal Font de Sant Lluís, Valencia
Attendance: 0
Referees: Wojciech Liszka (POL), Elena Chernova (RUS), Jan Baloun (CZE)

=== Italy vs Montenegro ===
18 June 2021
15:00

Boxscore

Italy	77–61	Montenegro
Scoring by quarter: 25–17, 9–10, 25–17, 18–17
Pts: Carangelo 13; Rebs: Cubaj 8 Asts: Zandalasini 3		Pts: Dubljević 23; Rebs: Dubljević 7 Asts: Mujović 6

Pavelló Municipal Font de Sant Lluís, Valencia
Attendance: 104
Referees: Özlem Yalman (TUR), Thomas Bissuel (FRA), Geert Jacobs (BEL)

=== Montenegro vs Serbia ===
20 June 2021
12:00

Boxscore

Montenegro	75–87	Serbia
Scoring by quarter: 24–19, 15–26, 19–21, 17–21
Pts: Gatling 22; Rebs: Gatling 6 Asts: Mujović 12		Pts: Krajišnik 20; Rebs: Krajišnik 9 Asts: Vasić 4

Pavelló Municipal Font de Sant Lluís, Valencia
Attendance: 937
Referees: Martin Horozov (BUL), Özlem Yalman (TUR), Geert Jacobs (BEL)

=== Italy vs Greece ===
20 June 2021
18:00

Boxscore

Italy	77–67	Greece
Scoring by quarter: 21–13, 20–11, 17–23, 19–20
Pts: Penna 13; Rebs: Cubaj 8 Asts: Zandalasini 6		Pts: Stamolamprou 23; Rebs: Nikolopoulou 7 Asts: Nikolopoulou 6

Pavelló Municipal Font de Sant Lluís, Valencia
Attendance: 734
Referees: Blaž Zupančič (SLO), Sonia Teixeira (POR), Alexandra Stan (ROU)
