= 2012–13 Clemson Tigers women's basketball team =

Women's college basketball season

2012–13 Clemson Tigers women's basketball
- Conference: Atlantic Coast Conference
- Record: 9–21 (5–13 ACC)
- Head coach: Itoro Coleman (3rd season)
- Home arena: Littlejohn Coliseum

The 2012–13 Clemson Tigers women's basketball team represented Clemson University during the 2012–13 NCAA Division I women's basketball season. The Tigers were led by third year head coach Itoro Coleman. The Tigers, members of the Atlantic Coast Conference, played their home games at Littlejohn Coliseum.

== Schedule ==
| Date time, TV | Rank^{#} | Opponent^{#} | Result | Record | Site city, state |
|---|---|---|---|---|---|
| November 11, 2012* | | Presbyterian | L 46–49 | 0–1 | Littlejohn Coliseum; Clemson, South Carolina |
| November 13, 2012* | | South Florida | L 73–75 ^{OT} | 0–2 | Littlejohn Coliseum; Clemson, South Carolina |
| November 18, 2012* | | at South Carolina rivalry | L 43–64 | 0–3 | Colonial Life Arena; Columbia, South Carolina |
| November 23, 2012* | | vs. Montana State; Hoops for a Cure Classic | L 52–58 | 0–4 | Moody Coliseum; Dallas, Texas |
| November 24, 2012* | | vs. SIU Edwardsville; Hoops for a Cure Classic | L 43–49 | 0–5 | Moody Coliseum; Dallas, Texas |
| November 28, 2012* | | at Indiana; ACC–Big Ten Women's Challenge | L 49–52 | 0–6 | Assembly Hall; Bloomington, Indiana |
| December 2, 2012* | | Jacksonville | W 87–58 | 1–6 | Littlejohn Coliseum; Clemson, South Carolina |
| December 9, 2012* | | South Carolina State | L 55–67 | 1–7 | Littlejohn Coliseum; Clemson, South Carolina |
| December 16, 2012* | | Radford | W 74–55 | 2–7 | Littlejohn Coliseum; Clemson, South Carolina |
| December 19, 2012* | | vs. Providence; Carolinas Challenge | W 62–47 | 3–7 | Myrtle Beach Convention Center; Myrtle Beach, South Carolina |
| December 22, 2012* | | Samford | W 63–51 | 4–7 | Littlejohn Coliseum; Clemson, South Carolina |
| December 30, 2012 | | No. 16 North Carolina | L 58–65 | 4–8 (0–1) | Littlejohn Coliseum; Clemson, South Carolina |
| January 3, 2013 | | at Miami (FL) | L 56–78 | 4–9 (0–2) | BankUnited Center; Miami, Florida |
| January 6, 2013 | | Georgia Tech | L 59–81 | 4–10 (0–3) | Littlejohn Coliseum; Clemson, South Carolina |
| January 10, 2013 | | at No. 4 Duke | L 45–82 | 4–11 (0–4) | Cameron Indoor Stadium; Durham, North Carolina |
| January 13, 2013 | | Boston College | L 43–66 | 4–12 (0–5) | Littlejohn Coliseum; Clemson, South Carolina |
| January 17, 2013 | | at Wake Forest | W 74–64 | 5–12 (1–5) | LJVM Coliseum; Winston-Salem, North Carolina |
| January 24, 2013 | | No. 4 Duke | L 46–60 | 5–13 (1–6) | Littlejohn Coliseum; Clemson, South Carolina |
| January 27, 2013 | | No. 10 Maryland | L 40–80 | 5–14 (1–7) | Littlejohn Coliseum; Clemson, South Carolina |
| January 31, 2013 | | at Virginia Tech | W 47–37 | 6–14 (2–7) | Cassell Coliseum; Blacksburg, Virginia |
| February 3, 2013 | | at No. 20 Florida State | L 61–83 | 6–15 (2–8) | Donald L. Tucker Civic Center; Tallahassee, Florida |
| February 7, 2013 | | Miami (FL) | L 46–62 | 6–16 (2–9) | Littlejohn Coliseum; Clemson, South Carolina |
| February 10, 2013 | | at NC State | L 45–79 | 6–17 (2–10) | Reynolds Coliseum; Raleigh, North Carolina |
| February 14, 2013 | | at No. 7 Maryland | L 45–75 | 6–18 (2–11) | Comcast Center; College Park, Maryland |
| February 17, 2013 | | Virginia Tech | W 51–46 | 7–18 (3–11) | Littlejohn Coliseum; Clemson, South Carolina |
| February 21, 2013 | | Virginia | W 64–62 | 8–18 (4–11) | Littlejohn Coliseum; Clemson, South Carolina |
| February 24, 2013 | | at Boston College | W 64–61 | 9–18 (5–11) | Conte Forum; Chestnut Hill, Massachusetts |
| February 28, 2013* | | at Georgia Tech | L 48–74 | 9–19 (5–11) | McCamish Pavilion; Atlanta, Georgia |
| March 3, 2013 | | NC State | L 47–63 | 9–20 (5–12) | Littlejohn Coliseum; Clemson, South Carolina |
ACC Tournament
| March 7, 2013 | | vs. NC State; ACC Tournament first round | L 45–56 | 9–21 (5–13) | Greensboro Coliseum; Greensboro, North Carolina |
*Non-conference game. ^{#}Rankings from AP Poll. (#) Tournament seedings in parentheses.
