= Jonquel Jones =

Bahamian-Bosnian basketball player (born 1994)

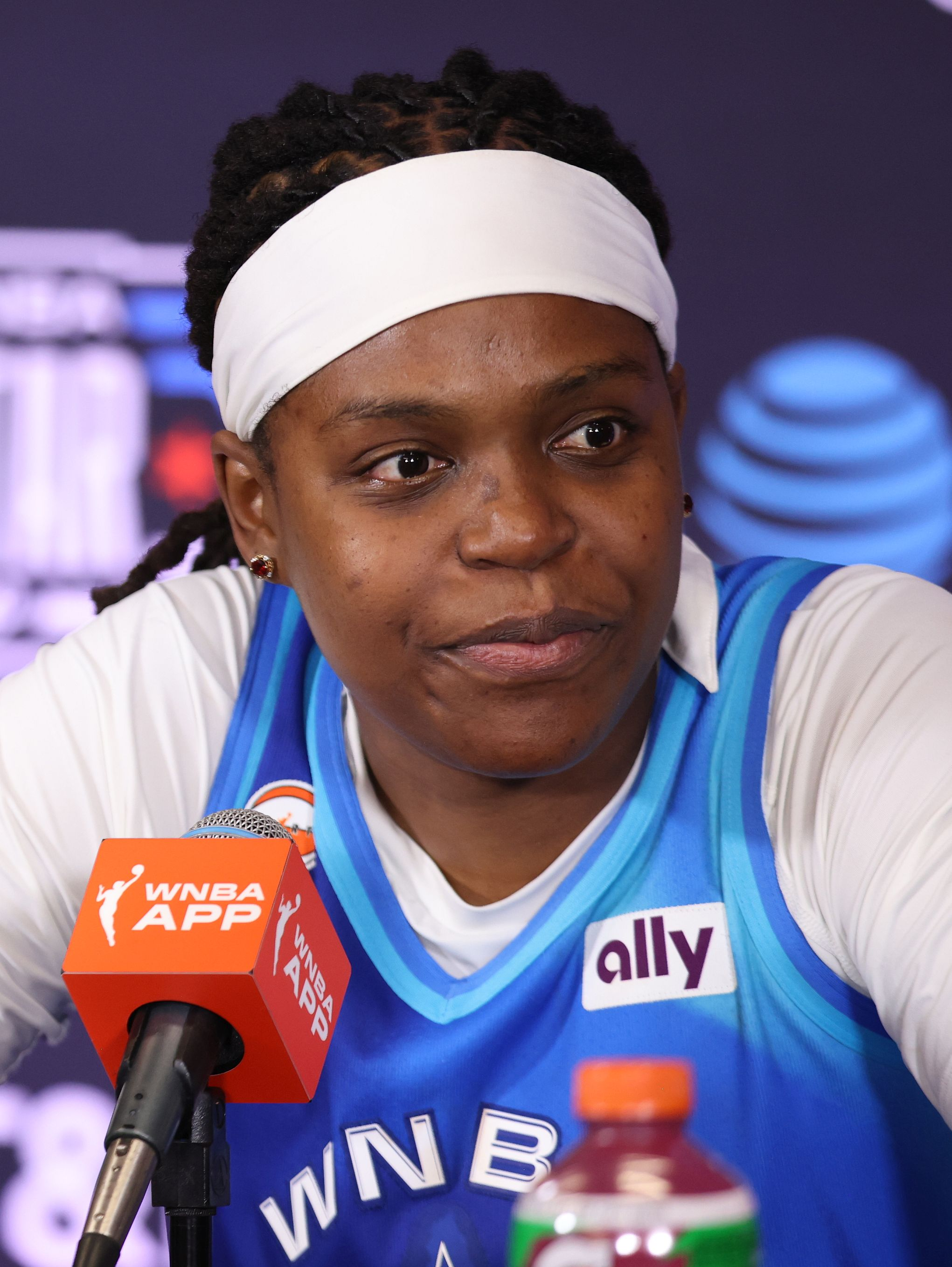
- Jones in 2026

No. 35 – New York Liberty
- Position: Power forward / center
- League: WNBA

Personal information
- Born: January 5, 1994 (age 32) Freeport, The Bahamas
- Listed height: 6 ft 6 in (1.98 m)
- Listed weight: 215 lb (98 kg)

Career information
- High school: Riverdale Baptist School (Upper Marlboro, Maryland)
- College: Clemson (2012–2013); George Washington (2013–2016)
- WNBA draft: 2016: 1st round, 6th overall pick
- Drafted by: Los Angeles Sparks
- Playing career: 2016–present

Career history
- 2016–2019, 2021–2022: Connecticut Sun
- 2016–2017: Asan Woori Bank Wibee
- 2017–2018: Shanxi Flame
- 2018–2022: UMMC Ekaterinburg
- 2022: Çukurova Basketbol
- 2023–present: New York Liberty
- 2023–2024: Inner Mongolia
- 2024–2025: Sichuan Yuanda

Career highlights
- WNBA champion (2024); WNBA Finals MVP (2024); WNBA MVP (2021); 6× WNBA All-Star (2017, 2019, 2021, 2022, 2024, 2026); WNBA All-Star Game MVP (2026); All-WNBA First Team (2021); 4× All-WNBA Second Team (2017, 2019, 2022, 2024); WNBA Most Improved Player Award (2017); WNBA Peak Performer (2017); WNBA Sixth Woman of the Year (2018); 2× WNBA Commissioner's Cup Champion (2023, 2026); WNBA Commissioner's Cup MVP (2023); 3× WNBA rebounding leader (2017, 2019, 2021); 2× WNBA All-Defensive First Team (2019, 2021); 2× WNBA All-Defensive Second Team (2022, 2024); WNBA blocks leader (2019); No. 35 retired by Connecticut Sun; WKBL champion (2017); WKBL Foreign MVP (2017); WKBL Defensive Player of The Year (2017); Atlantic 10 Player of the Year (2015); Atlantic 10 Defensive Player of the Year (2015); Bosnian Sportswoman of the Year (2021)
- Stats at WNBA.com
- Stats at Basketball Reference

Jonquel Orthea Jones (born January 5, 1994) is a Bahamian-Bosnian professional basketball player for the New York Liberty of the Women's National Basketball Association (WNBA). She was drafted with the sixth overall pick in the 2016 WNBA draft. Born and raised in the Bahamas, Jones is a naturalized citizen of Bosnia and Herzegovina and played for the Bosnia and Herzegovina women's national basketball team from 2019 through 2022.

A 6'6" power forward/center, Jones played college basketball for Clemson and George Washington. After the February 2022 Russian invasion of Ukraine, she left the Russian team UMMC Ekaterinburg, and joined the Turkish team Çukurova Basketbol.

== Early life ==
Jones was born in The Bahamas. She attended Tabernacle Baptist Academy. At age 14, she moved to Maryland, where she attended Riverdale Baptist School. Temple women's basketball head coach Diane Richardson became her legal guardian. Her nickname in high school was "Big Slim".

== WNBA career ==
In 2016, Jones was acquired by the Connecticut Sun after having her draft rights traded by the Los Angeles Sparks in exchange for Chelsea Gray and two draft picks. In her rookie season, Jones was the backup center for the Sun. She averaged 6.8 ppg, 3.7 rpg and 1.1 bpg in 34 games with 6 starts.

In 2017, Jones became the starting center for the Sun and had a breakout second season. After an 0–4 start, Jones led the Sun to their first win of the season, scoring 23 points along with 21 rebounds in a 97–79 win over the Chicago Sky, making her the 13th player in league history to record a 20-point, 20-rebound performance. On July 8, Jones scored a team-high 22 points and 9 rebounds as the Sun completed the biggest comeback in franchise history, defeating the Washington Mystics 96–92 after overcoming a 22-point deficit. Jones was selected to the 2017 WNBA All-Star Game, her first career All-Star Game appearance. She finished the season averaging a double-double in points and rebounds and also averaged career-highs in scoring, rebounding, and blocks. She broke the single season record for rebounds with 403, breaking Tina Charles previous record of 398 (the record would be broken again by Sylvia Fowles in 2018). Jones was selected to the 2017 WNBA All-Star Game and received the WNBA Most Improved Player Award. Her breakout performance, along with teammates Jasmine Thomas and Alyssa Thomas emerging as All-Stars, led the Sun to the playoffs as the fourth-seeded team. They received a bye to the second-round elimination game, where Jones scored 19 points and grabbed 15 rebounds in an 88–83 loss to the number 5-seeded Phoenix Mercury.

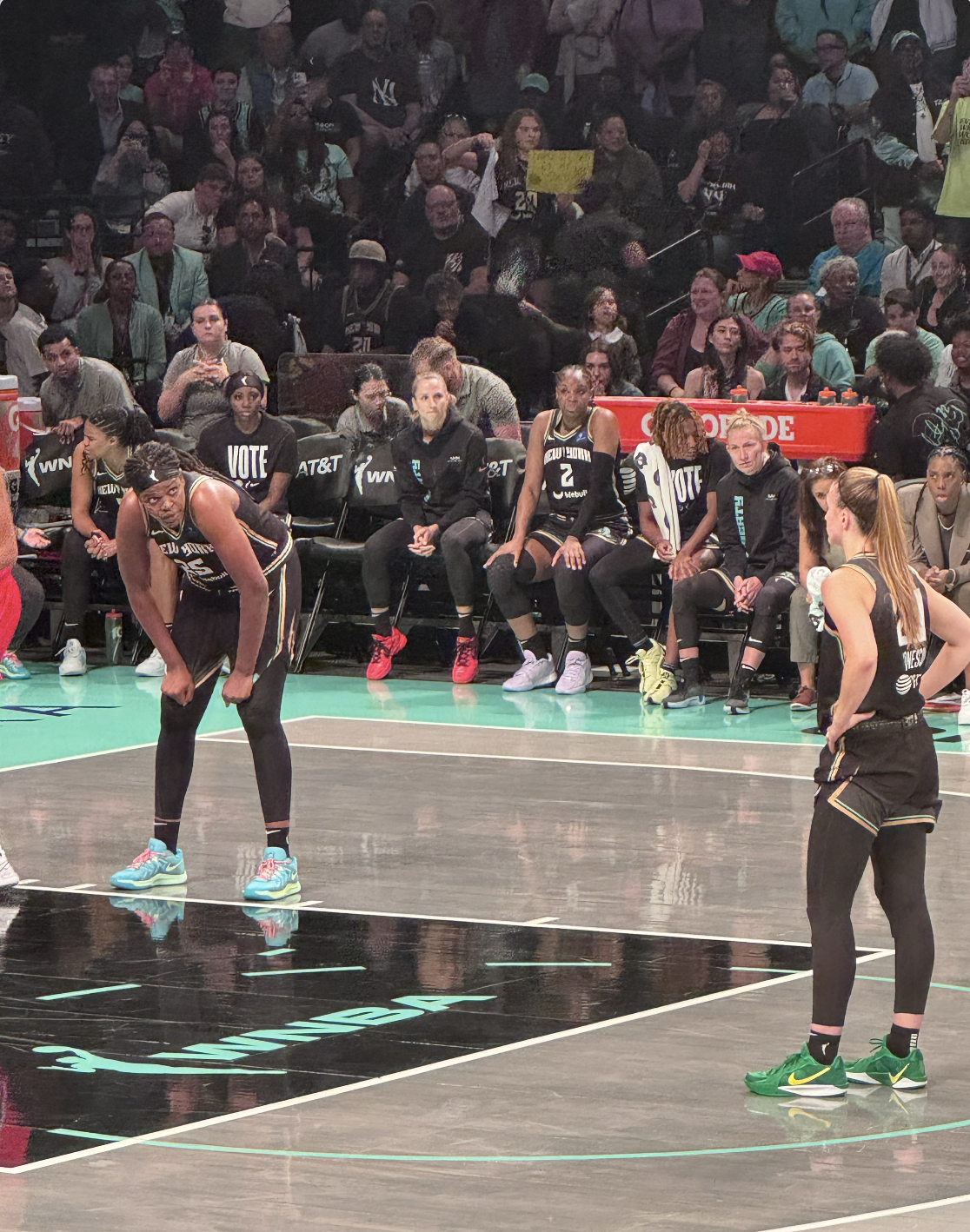
Jones on the court with Sabrina Ionescu at the New York Liberty vs the Las Vegas Aces, September 8, 2024

In 2018, Jones would have a reduced role on the team despite her success from last season. She started in 16 of the 34 games played but would still effective for the Sun both in the starting lineup and off the bench. By the end of the season, Jones won the WNBA Sixth Woman of the Year award. The Sun made it back to the playoffs as the number 4 seed with a 21–13 record, receiving a bye to the second round. However the Sun would lose yet again to the Phoenix Mercury in the second round elimination game by a final score of 96–86.

In 2019, Jones would redeem her starting Center role for the whole season. She would lead the league in rebounds once again and averaged a career-high in blocks, steals and minutes by the end of the season. Jones was also voted into the 2019 WNBA All-Star Game, making it her second all-star appearance and would also make WNBA Second Team. The Sun were a championship contender in the league, finishing with a 23–11 record and the number 2 seed, receiving a double bye to the semi-finals. In the semi-finals, the Sun swept the Los Angeles Sparks 3–0 to advance to the WNBA Finals, making it the franchise's first Finals appearance since 2005, and Jones' first career Finals appearance. The WNBA Finals series was a hard-fought battle, but the Sun fell to the Washington Mystics in five games.

In June 2020, Jones announced that she would sit out the WNBA season due to the COVID-19 pandemic.

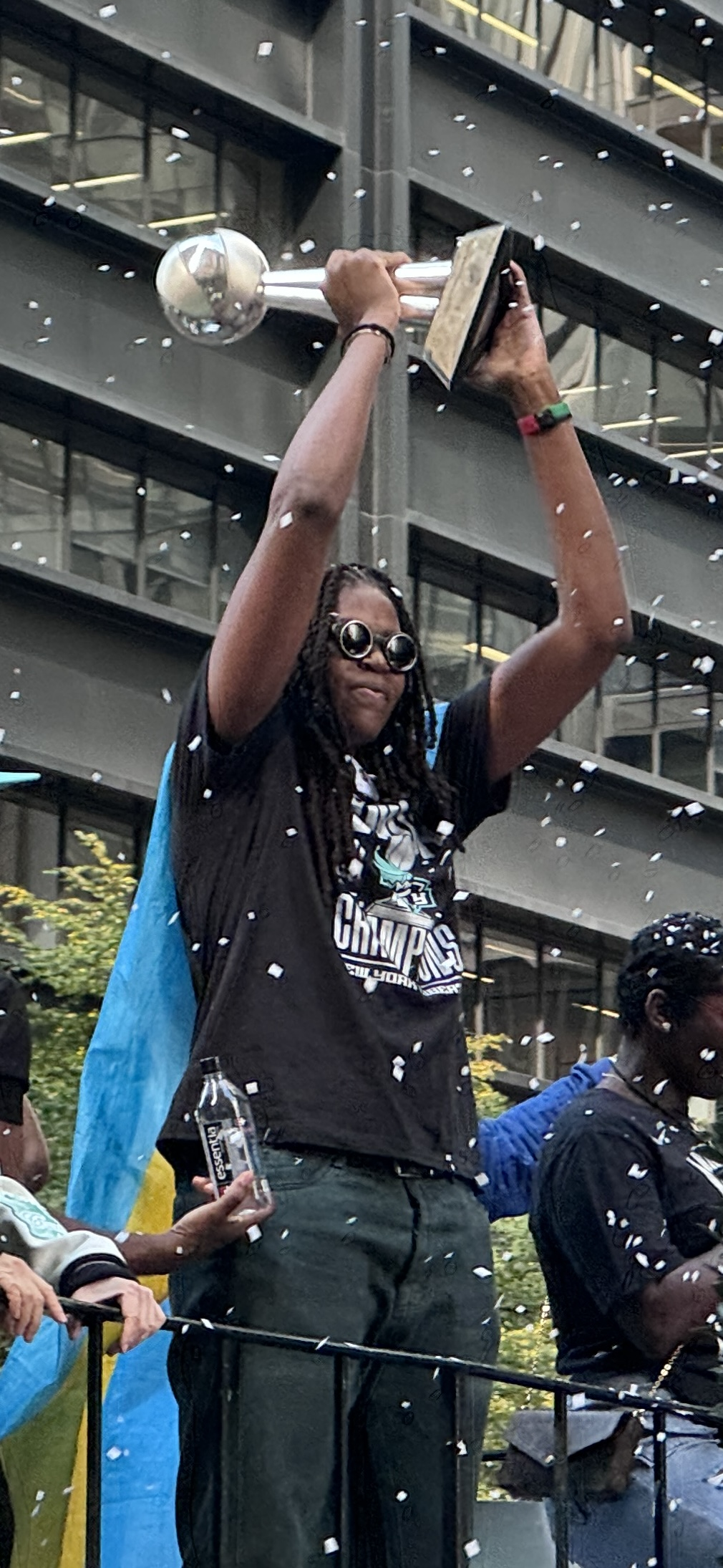
Jonquel Jones, holding the MVP Trophy at the 2024 NY Liberty Ticker Tape Parade

In 2021 Jones returned to the WNBA and led the Sun to the best record in the league; she additionally was averaging a career high in every major statistic before reporting to the FIBA Women's Eurobasket to represent the Bosnian women's national basketball team. When she returned the Sun, the team went back to being the top team in the league and closed out the season with a 14-game winning streak, leading to a record of 26–6 and the best record in the league. Jones averaged a career-high in points and assists, with averages of 19.4 points, 11.2 rebounds, 2.8 assists, 1.3 steals, and 1.3 blocks, and was named the 2021 WNBA MVP nearly unanimously. Jones also made WNBA All-Defensive First Team and nearly won the DPOY award. With winning MVP Jones became the first player in WNBA History to win MVP, Sixth Woman of the Year and WNBA Most Improved Player Award.

During the offseason prior to the 2023 WNBA season, Jones requested a trade out of Connecticut and was dealt to the New York Liberty on January 17, 2023. She was named the MVP of the 2023 Commissioner's Cup, winning it for the New York Liberty with 16 points and a game-high 15 rebounds. In the ensuing 2023 WNBA Playoffs, she confronted and eliminated her former team in the semifinal round, three games to one. In the 2024 season, she was named WNBA Finals MVP after scoring 17 points in the final Game 5 overtime game, in which the Liberty defeated the Minnesota Lynx 67-62.

== Overseas career ==
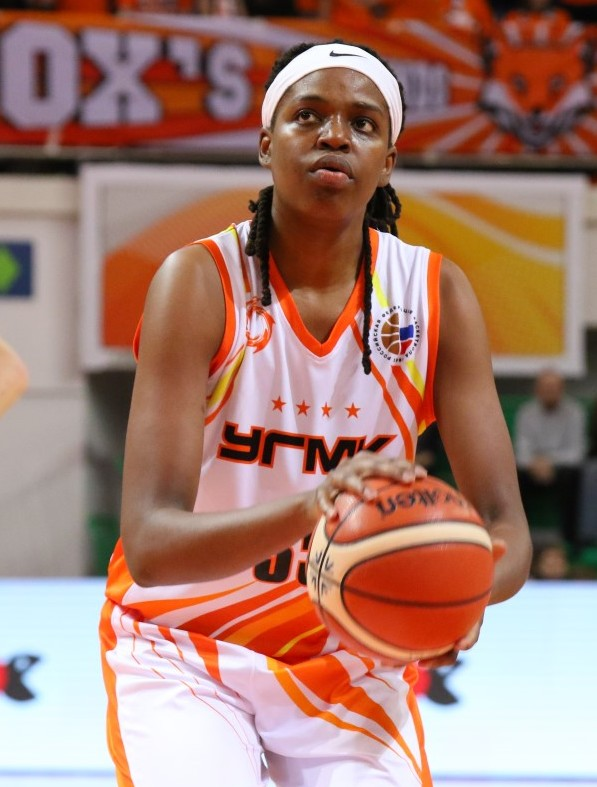
Jones with UMMC Ekaterinburg in 2019.

During the 2016–17 off-season, Jones signed with Asan Woori Bank Wibee of the Women's Korean Basketball League and won a championship with the team. In October 2017, Jones signed with Shanxi Flame of the Women's Chinese Basketball Association for the 2017–18 off-season.

In August 2018, Jones signed with UMMC Ekaterinburg of the Russian League. After the February 2022 Russian invasion of Ukraine, she left the Russian team.

In 2022, Jones joined the Turkish team Çukurova Basketbol of the Women's Basketball Super League.

Jones played for Inner Mongolia of the WCBA in the 2023–2024 season and led them to the finals.

For the 2024–2025 season, Jones joined Sichuan Yuanda in the WCBA.

== National team career ==
She made her debut for the national team of Bosnia and Herzegovina at the first round of EuroBasket Women 2021 qualification on 14 November 2019 against Russia. She claimed a double-double of 29 points and 16 rebounds on what proved to be an agonizing night for Russia coach Alexander Kovalev as he lost his first game at the helm in his hometown of Orenburg.

In a quarter-final loss against France in the EuroBasket Women 2021, she set an all-time record for most rebounds in a single EuroBasket game. She finished the game with 29 points and 24 rebounds, beating the previous record of 21 rebounds shared by three players. She was named to the FIBA EuroBasket Women All-Tournament Team.

In October 2022, Goran Lojo, the coach of the team, announced that Jones would no longer be playing for the national team, and that her spot as a naturalized player would in the future be filled by Courtney Hurt.

== Personal life ==
In 2019, Jones got a goldendoodle puppy.

== Career statistics ==
Legend
GP	Games played	GS	Games started	MPG	Minutes per game	RPG	Rebounds per game
APG	Assists per game	SPG	Steals per game	BPG	Blocks per game	PPG	Points per game
TO	Turnovers per game	FG%	Field-goal percentage	3P%	3-point field-goal percentage	FT%	Free-throw percentage
**Bold**	Career best	°	League leader

†	Denotes seasons in which Jones won a WNBA championship

=== WNBA ===
==== Regular season ====
WNBA regular season statistics
Year	Team	GP	GS	MPG	FG%	3P%	FT%	RPG	APG	SPG	BPG	TO	PPG
2016	Connecticut	34	6	14.1	.531	.333	.739	3.7	.6	.6	1.1	**.7**	6.8
2017	Connecticut	34	34	28.5	.534	.446	.818	**11.9**°	1.5	.8	1.4	1.6	15.4
2018	Connecticut	34	16	20.5	**.550**	**.467**	.671	5.5	1.7	.4	1.2	1.6	11.8
2019	Connecticut	34	34	28.8	.448	.309	.818	9.7°	1.5	1.2	**2.0**	1.9	14.6
2020	Did not play (opted out)												
2021	Connecticut	27	27	**31.7**	.515	.362	.802	11.2°	2.8	**1.3**	1.3	2.9	**19.4**
2022	Connecticut	33	32	26.4	.513	.369	.802	8.6	1.8	1.1	1.2	2.6	14.6
2023	New York	40	40	25.0	.527	.352	**.863**	8.4	1.8	.6	1.3	2.1	11.3
2024^{†}	New York	39	39	29.8	.539	.391	.788	9.0	**3.2**	.8	1.3	2.4	14.2
2025	New York	31	31	26.8	.490	.424	.769	8.1	2.7	.5	1.1	2.1	13.6
2026	New York	**43**	**43**	28.2	.495	.392	.812	9.1	2.6	.6	1.1	2.1	14.5
**Career**	10 years, 2 teams	349	302	26.0	.512	.384	.795	8.5	2.0	.8	1.3	2.0	13.5
**Career**	All-Star	6	5	22.4	.530	.404	.833	11.5	4.2	1.2	.7	1.0	18.7

==== Playoffs ====
WNBA playoff statistics
Year	Team	GP	GS	MPG	FG%	3P%	FT%	RPG	APG	SPG	BPG	TO	PPG
2017	Connecticut	1	1	**39.2**	.385	.400	.875	**15.0**	2.0	.0	.0	1.0	**19.0**
2018	Connecticut	1	1	26.2	**.667**	.000	**1.000**	7.0	**7.0**	.0	.0	**.0**	13.0
2019	Connecticut	8	8	32.5	.528	.267	.767	10.4	2.0	.6	1.5	1.8	17.9
2021	Connecticut	4	4	35.0	.458	.444	.778	9.8	3.3	**1.3**	2.3	2.0	16.3
2022	Connecticut	**12**	**12**	27.0	.507	.414	.829	8.4	2.0	.6	1.1	2.1	14.9
2023	New York	10	10	34.7	.559	.321	.787	11.6	1.7	.7	2.4°	2.0	17.0
2024^{†}	New York	11	11	32.5	.550	.448	.946	8.2	2.2	.7	.6	2.8	15.5
2025	New York	3	3	30.0	.269	.182	.500	11.0	2.3	.0	2.0	1.3	5.7
2026	New York	5	5	33.2	.607	**.474**	.846	10.2	2.4	.6	**2.8**	2.6	17.6
**Career**	9 years, 2 teams	55	55	31.8	.522	.364	.830	9.7	2.2	.7	1.5	2.1	15.7

=== College ===
NCAA statistics
Year	Team	GP	GS	MPG	FG%	3P%	FT%	RPG	APG	SPG	BPG	TO	PPG
2012–13	Clemson	8	4	**29.8**	.483	.300	**.792**	10.0	.8	.5	2.1	**2.0**	9.8
2013–14	George Washington	23	23	26.3	**.488**	.293	.639	10.9	1.7	.8	1.9	4.1	14.7
2014–15	George Washington	**30**	**30**	26.8	.478	.306	.664	12.5	2.1	.7	1.9	2.8	15.3
2015–16	George Washington	23	20	**29.8**	.417	**.311**	.745	**14.6**	**2.3**	**1.0**	**3.3**	4.1	**16.2**
**Career**		84	77	27.8	.462	.304	.695	12.4	1.9	.8	2.3	3.4	14.9

== See also ==
- List of WNBA career blocks leaders
- List of WNBA career rebounding leaders
