= Nikola Dudášová =

Slovak basketball player (born 1995)

Innova-tsn Leganés
- Position: Point guard
- League: Liga Femenina

Personal information
- Born: 17 March 1995 (age 31) Banská Bystrica, Slovakia
- Listed height: 5 ft 10 in (1.78 m)

Career information
- Playing career: 2010–present

Career history
- 2010–2018: Piešťanské Čajky
- 2018–2019: BK Žabiny Brno
- 2019–2020: MBK Ružomberok
- 2020–2021: Ślęza Wrocław
- 2021–2022: PEAC-Pécs
- 2022–2023: Elitzur Ramla
- 2023–2024: KSC Szekszárd
- 2024–2025: BK Žabiny Brno
- 2025: Reyer Venezia
- 2025–present: Innova-tsn Leganés

Nikola Dudášová (born 17 March 1995) is a Slovak basketball player for Innova-tsn Leganés and the Slovak national team.

She participated at the EuroBasket Women three times (2017, 2021 and 2023).
