= EuroBasket Women 1999 =

1999 edition of the EuroBasket Women

EuroBasket 1999 Women
27th FIBA European Women's Basketball Championship

Tournament details
- Host country: Poland
- Dates: May 28 – June 6
- Teams: 12

Final positions
- Champions: Poland (1st title)
- Runners-up: France
- Third place: Russia
- Fourth place: Slovakia

Official website
- Official website (archive)

The 1999 European Women Basketball Championship, commonly called EuroBasket Women 1999, was the 27th regional championship held by FIBA Europe. The competition was held in Poland and took place from May 28 to June 6, 1999. Host Poland won the gold medal and France the silver medal while Russia won the bronze.

== Preliminary round ==
=== Group A ===
| Team | Pts. | W | L | PCT | PF | PA | Diff |
|---|---|---|---|---|---|---|---|
| Russia | 10 | 5 | 0 | 1.000 | 368 | 281 | +87 |
| France | 9 | 4 | 1 | 0.800 | 311 | 269 | +42 |
| Croatia | 7 | 2 | 3 | 0.400 | 309 | 336 | −27 |
| Slovakia | 7 | 2 | 3 | 0.400 | 298 | 295 | +3 |
| Germany | 6 | 1 | 4 | 0.200 | 307 | 346 | −39 |
| Latvia | 6 | 1 | 4 | 0.200 | 311 | 377 | −66 |

=== Group B ===
| Team | Pts. | W | L | PCT | PF | PA | Diff |
|---|---|---|---|---|---|---|---|
| Lithuania | 9 | 4 | 1 | 0.800 | 382 | 333 | +49 |
| Poland | 8 | 3 | 2 | 0.600 | 383 | 355 | +28 |
| FR Yugoslavia | 8 | 3 | 2 | 0.600 | 369 | 318 | +51 |
| Czech Republic | 8 | 3 | 2 | 0.600 | 386 | 357 | 29 |
| Italy | 7 | 2 | 3 | 0.400 | 303 | 312 | −9 |
| Bosnia and Herzegovina | 5 | 0 | 5 | 0.000 | 273 | 421 | −158 |

== Knockout stage ==
=== Championship bracket ===
Quarter-finals
Poland | 72
Croatia | 51
Russia | 61
Czech Republic | 51
France | 64
FR Yugoslavia | 58
Slovakia | 69
Lithuania | 63

Semi-finals
Poland | 66
Russia | 61
France | 66
Slovakia | 39

Final
Poland | 59
France | 56
Third place
Russia | 78
Slovakia | 49

=== 5th place bracket ===
Semi-finals
Czech Republic | 67
Croatia | 52
FR Yugoslavia | 57
Lithuania | 71

Fifth place
Czech Republic | 53
Lithuania | 43
Seventh place
Croatia | 72
FR Yugoslavia | 88

=== 9th place bracket ===
Semi-finals
Germany | 65
Bosnia and Herzegovina | 75
Italy | 54
Latvia | 55

Ninth place
Bosnia and Herzegovina | 60
Latvia | 64
Eleventh place
Germany | 69
Italy | 73

Eurobasket Women 1999 champion

Poland
First title

== Final standings ==
| Place | Team | W-L |
|---|---|---|
| 1 | Poland | 6–2 |
| 2 | France | 6–2 |
| 3 | Russia | 7–1 |
| 4 | Slovakia | 3–5 |
| 5 | Czech Republic | 5–3 |
| 6 | Lithuania | 5–3 |
| 7 | FR Yugoslavia | 4–4 |
| 8 | Croatia | 2–6 |
| 9 | Latvia | 3–4 |
| 10 | Bosnia and Herzegovina | 1–6 |
| 11 | Italy | 2–5 |
| 12 | Germany | 2–5 |
