= Croatia women's national basketball team =

Women's national basketball team representing Croatia

Croatia
- FIBA ranking: 38 ▲2 (18 March 2026)
- Joined FIBA: 1993
- FIBA zone: FIBA Europe
- National federation: Croatian Basketball Federation
- Coach: Stipe Bralić

Olympic Games
- Appearances: 1
- Medals: None

World Cup
- Appearances: None

EuroBasket
- Appearances: 7
- Medals: None

Mediterranean Games
- Appearances: 4
- Medals: (gold) Gold: (1997, 2001); (silver) Silver: (2005); (bronze) Bronze: (2009)
Medal record
Mediterranean Games
Gold medal – first place	1997 Italy	Team
Gold medal – first place	2001 Tunisia	Team
Silver medal – second place	2005 Spain	Team
Bronze medal – third place	2009 Italy	Team

The Croatia women's national basketball team is the national representative for Croatia in international women's basketball competition. The team is controlled by the Croatian Basketball Federation (Hrvatski košarkaški savez).

== Results ==
Prior to 1992 the Croatia women's national basketball team competed as a part of the Yugoslavia women's national basketball team.

The lone competition the Croatia women's national team have never qualified for is the FIBA Women's World Cup.

=== Olympic Games ===
Year	Round	Position
(United States) 1996	Did not qualify	
(Australia) 2000	Did not qualify	
(Greece) 2004	Did not qualify	
(China) 2008	Did not qualify	
(United Kingdom) 2012	Preliminary Round	10th
(Brazil) 2016	Did not qualify	
(Japan) 2020	Did not qualify	
(France) 2024	Did not qualify	
(United States) 2028	To be determined	

=== EuroBasket Women ===
Year	Round	Position
(Italy) 1993	Did not qualify	
(Czech Republic) 1995	Quarterfinal	8th
(Hungary) 1997	Did not qualify	
(Poland) 1999	Quarterfinal	8th
(France) 2001	Did not qualify	
(Greece) 2003	Did not qualify	
(Turkey) 2005	Did not qualify	
(Italy) 2007	Preliminary Round	13th
(Latvia) 2009	Did not qualify	
(Poland) 2011	Quarterfinal	5th
(France) 2013	Main Round	11th
(Hungary) (Romania) 2015	Main Round	12th
(Czech Republic) 2017	Did not qualify	
(Latvia) (Serbia) 2019	Did not qualify	
(France) (Spain) 2021	Qualification to quarterfinal	11th
(Israel) (Slovenia) 2023	Did not qualify	
(Czech Republic) (Germany) (Italy) (Greece) 2025	Did not qualify	
(Belgium) (Finland) (Sweden) (Lithuania) 2027	To be determined	

=== Mediterranean Games ===
Croatia is the most successful women's basketball team at the Mediterranean Games.

Year	Round	Position
(France) 1993	Did not participate	
(Italy) 1997	Final	1st place, gold medalist(s)
(Tunisia) 2001	Final	1st place, gold medalist(s)
(Spain) 2005	Final	2nd place, silver medalist(s)
(Italy) 2009	Semi-final	3rd place, bronze medalist(s)

- At the 2013 Mediterranean Games the women's basketball tournament was cancelled because too few teams applied for the competition which was mainly due to coinciding dates with EuroBasket 2013.

== Team ==
=== Current roster ===
The roster for the EuroBasket Women 2025 qualifiers.

Croatia women's national basketball team roster
Players
Coaches

Pos.	No.	Name	Age – Date of birth	Height	Club	Ctr.
PG	0	Mihaela Lazić	24 – 20 November 2000	1.68 m (5 ft 6 in)	Beşiktaş JK	(Turkey)
SG	1	Shavonte Zellous	38 – 28 August 1986	1.78 m (5 ft 10 in)	ESB Villeneuve-d'Ascq	(France)
G	3	Ivana Ujevic	24 – 21 February 2000	1.76 m (5 ft 9 in)	ZKK Pula	(Croatia)
PF	4	Ana-Marija Begić	30 – 17 January 1994	1.91 m (6 ft 3 in)	BDS Dinamo Sassari	(Italy)
PG	5	Karla Erjavec	25 – 17 June 1999	1.80 m (5 ft 11 in)	CB Islas Canarias	(Spain)
SG	6	Iva Slonjšak	27 – 16 April 1997	1.83 m (6 ft 0 in)	ESB Villeneuve-d'Ascq	(France)
PG	7	Matea Tadić	26 – 25 October 1998	1.76 m (5 ft 9 in)	Celta de Vigo Baloncesto	(Spain)
F	9	Lena Bilić	17 – 2 May 2007	1.90 m (6 ft 3 in)	ZKK Tresnjevka 2009	(Croatia)
F	10	Andrijana Cvitković	30 – 28 April 1994	1.90 m (6 ft 3 in)	Panathinaikos	(Greece)
F	11	Anđela Strize	25 – 25 July 1999	1.76 m (5 ft 9 in)	WBC Sibenik	(Croatia)
F	12	Ana Mandić	23 – 9 January 2001	1.85 m (6 ft 1 in)	Cadi La Seu	(Spain)
F	13	Iva Belošević	27 – 23 July 1997	1.87 m (6 ft 2 in)	Basket Ostrava	(Czech Republic)
G	22	Nerea Brajac	25 – 28 October 1999	1.72 m (5 ft 8 in)	BC FSV	(Croatia)
SG	24	Klaudia Periša	28 – 10 December 1996	1.80 m (5 ft 11 in)	VOO Liege Panthers	(Belgium)
C	28	Patricia Bura	28 – 30 July 1996	1.92 m (6 ft 4 in)	Elitzur Ramla	(Israel)
F	44	Karmen Čičić	26 – 28 October 1994	1.85 m (6 ft 1 in)	Pallacanestro Sanga Milano	(Italy)
PF	91	Tihana Stojsavljević	23 – 27 September 1997	1.89 m (6 ft 2 in)	ZKK Ragusa	(Croatia)

Head coach

- (Croatia) Stipe Bralić

Assistant coach(es)

- (Croatia) Iva Borović Gregov
- (Croatia) Korana Longin Cvitan

Legend

- Club – describes last
  club before the tournament
- Age – describes age
  on 23 December 2024

=== Notable players ===
- Korana Longin-Zanze
- Sandra Mandir
- Anđa Jelavić
- Antonija Mišura
