= Frida Eldebrink =

Swedish basketball player

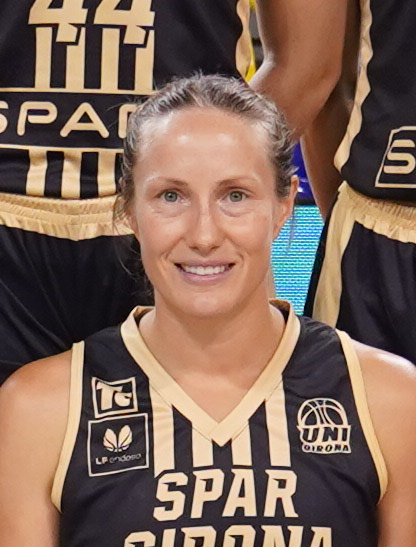

No. 9 – Chartres
- Position: Guard
- League: La Boulangère Wonderligue

Personal information
- Born: 4 January 1988 (age 38) Östertälje, Sweden
- Listed height: 5 ft 9 in (1.75 m)

Career information
- Playing career: 2006–present

Career history
- 2006–2008: Sodertalje
- 2008–2010: Tarbes
- 2010–2011: BK Brno
- 2011–2012: USK Praha
- 2012–2013: Bourges
- 2013–2014: Rivas Ecópolis
- 2014–2015: Beşiktaş
- 2015–2016: Dynamo Kursk
- 2016: San Antonio Stars
- 2016–2017: Mersin
- 2017: Samsun
- 2017–2018: Botaş
- 2018–2019: Szekszárd
- 2019–2020: Botaş
- 2020–2022: Uni Girona
- 2022–2024: Sodertalje
- 2024–present: Chartres
- Stats at Basketball Reference

Frida Eldebrink (born 4 January 1988) is a Swedish basketball player who last played for the San Antonio Stars of the Women's National Basketball Association (WNBA).

Her twin sister Elin is also a basketball player. They are daughters of Kenth Eldebrink, javelin thrower and olympic medallist in 1984, while their uncle Anders Eldebrink is a former professional ice hockey player.

== Career Statistics ==
=== WNBA ===
Year	Team	GP	GS	MPG	FG%	3P%	FT%	RPG	APG	SPG	BPG	TO	PPG
2016	San Antonio	8	0	5.5	12.5	0	50.0	0.4	0.9	0.1	0.0	0.5	0.4
