= Ana-Marija Begić =

Croatian basketball player

No. 4 – Campus Promete
- Position: Small forward / power forward

Personal information
- Born: January 17, 1994 (age 32) Split, Croatia
- Listed height: 1.90 m (6 ft 3 in)

Career information
- WNBA draft: 2016: undrafted
- Playing career: 2007–present

Career history
- 2007–2008: Croatia Zagreb
- 2008–2015: Medveščak
- 2015–present: Campus Promete

Ana-Marija Begić (born January 17, 1994) is a Croatian female basketball player.
