= Elin Eldebrink =

Swedish basketball player (born 1988)

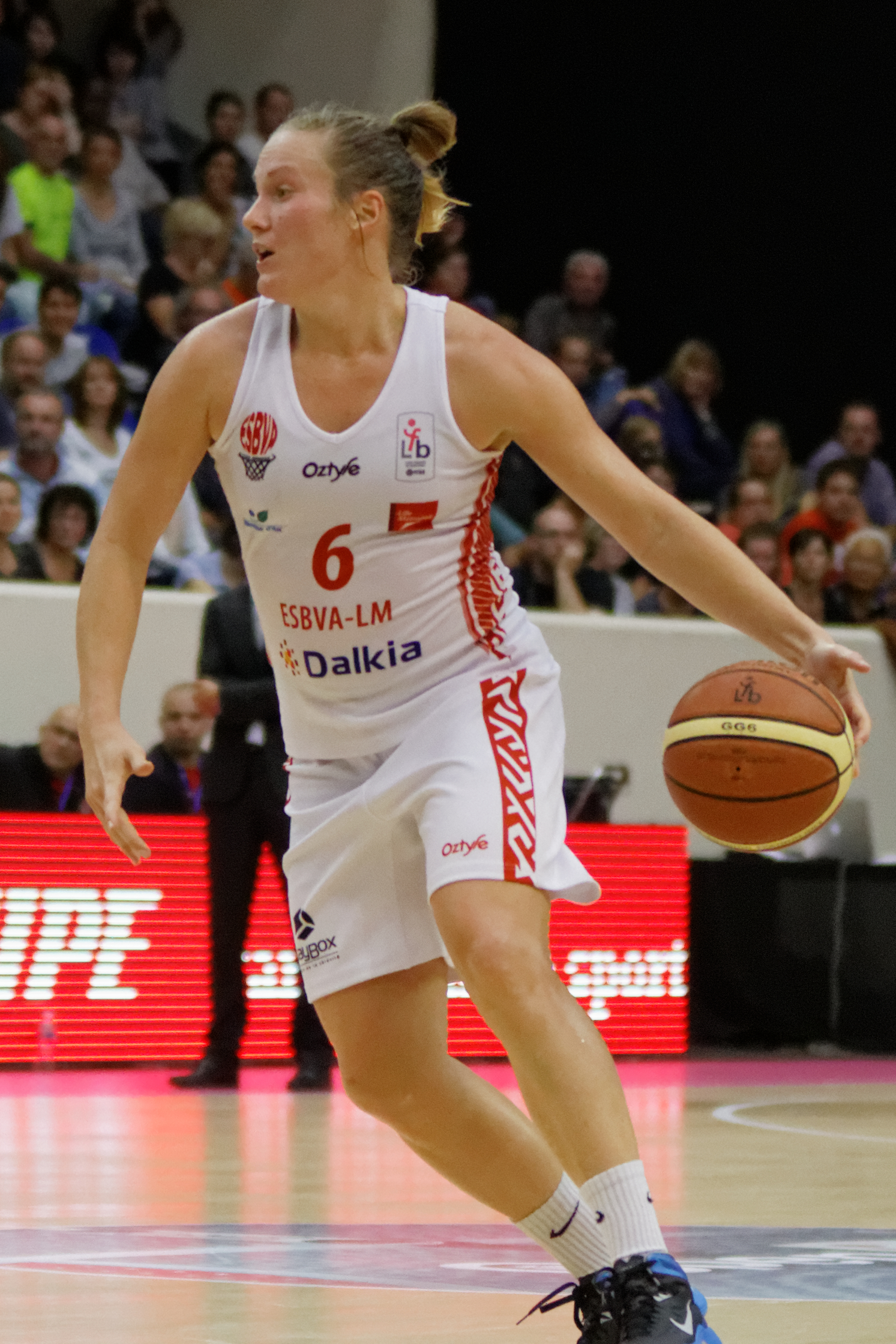
- Elin Eldebrink

Personal information
- Born: 4 January 1988 (age 38) Östertälje, Sweden

Elin Eldebrink (born 4 January 1988 in Östertälje) is a Swedish basketball player who plays for CJM Bourges Basket.

Her twin sister Frida is also a basketball player. They are daughters of Kenth Eldebrink, javelin thrower and olympic medallist in 1984, while their uncle Anders Eldebrink is a former professional ice hockey player.
