= Tina Krajišnik =

Serbian basketball player (born 1991)

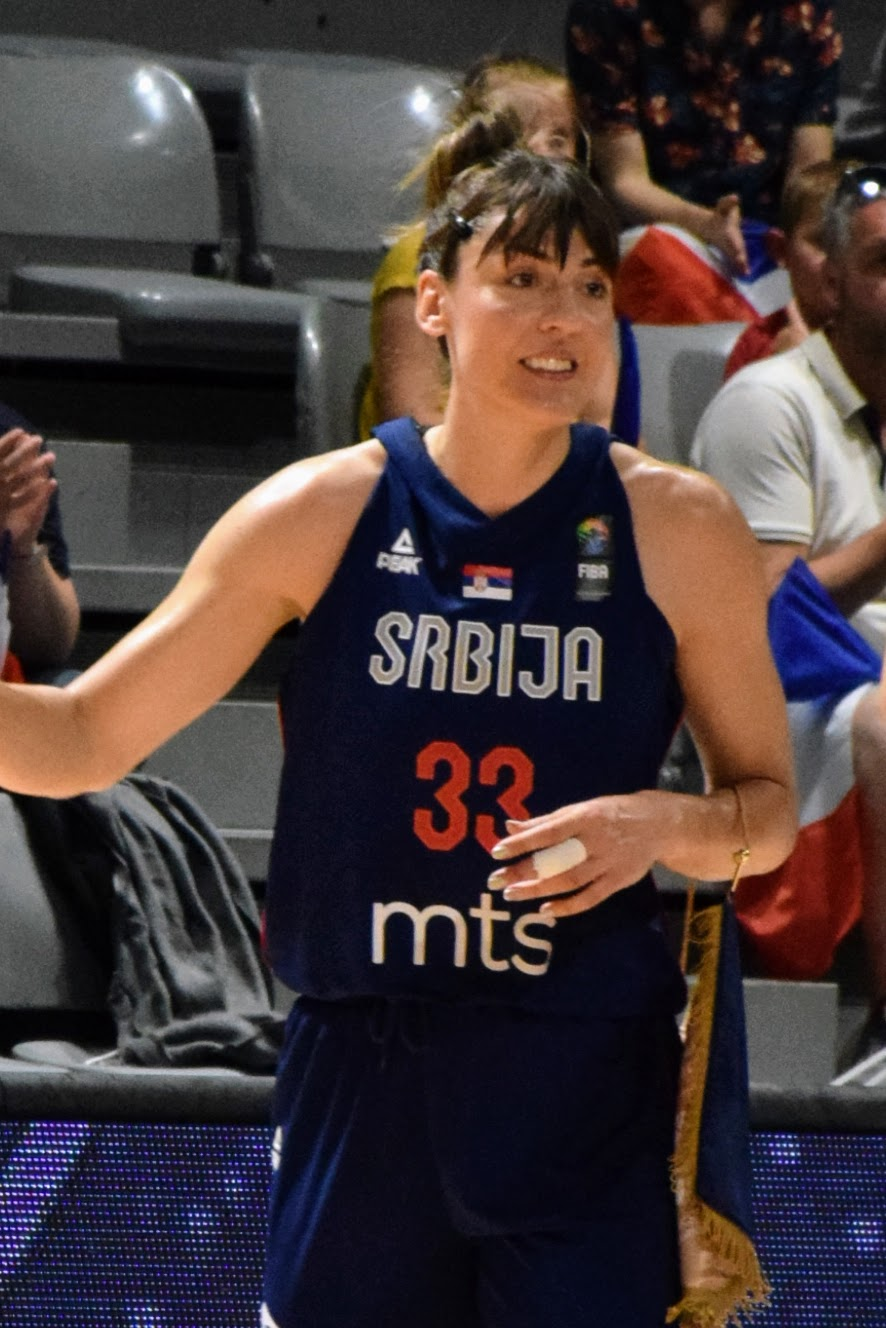

Bodrum Basketbol
- Position: Power forward
- League: Turkish Super League

Personal information
- Born: 12 January 1991 (age 35) Sarajevo, SR Bosnia-Herzegovina, SFR Yugoslavia
- Listed height: 6 ft 3 in (1.91 m)

Career history
- 2006–2009: ŽKK Loznica
- 2009–2013: ŽKK Radivoj Korać
- 2013–2014: ŽKK Crvena zvezda
- 2014–2015: PEAC-Pécs
- 2015–2017: Aluinvent Miskolc
- 2017–2021: Sopron Basket
- 2021–2022: Galatasaray
- 2022: Chicago Sky
- 2022–2024: UMMC Ekaterinburg
- 2024–2025: Bodrum Basketbol
- 2025: Beşiktaş JK

Career highlights
- 1× Serbian Player of the Year (2022)
- Stats at Basketball Reference
Medals
Women's basketball
Representing Serbia
EuroBasket
| Gold medal – first place | 2021 France/Spain |

Tina Krajišnik (née Jovanović; Serbian Cyrillic: Тина Јовановић Крајишник, born January 12, 1991) is a Serbian retired professional basketball player. She played for several European teams and for the Serbian national team.

== Club career ==
On 18 May 2021, she signed a one-year contract with Galatasaray.

== National Team career ==
She participated at the EuroBasket Women 2017 and 2021 where they won the gold medal. She also participated in 2022 World Cup with Serbia coming in 6th place.

== WNBA career statistics ==
Legend
| GP | Games played | GS | Games started | MPG | Minutes per game | RPG | Rebounds per game |
| APG | Assists per game | SPG | Steals per game | BPG | Blocks per game | PPG | Points per game |
| TO | Turnovers per game | FG% | Field-goal percentage | 3P% | 3-point field-goal percentage | FT% | Free-throw percentage |
| **Bold** | Career best | ° | League leader |

=== Regular season ===
| Year | Team | GP | GS | MPG | FG% | 3P% | FT% | RPG | APG | SPG | BPG | TO | PPG |
|---|---|---|---|---|---|---|---|---|---|---|---|---|---|
| 2022 | Chicago | 2 | 0 | 2.5 | .000 | .000 | .000 | 0.0 | 1.0 | 0.5 | 0.0 | 0.0 | 1.0 |
| Career | 1 year, 1 team | 2 | 0 | 2.5 | .000 | .000 | .000 | 0.0 | 1.0 | 0.5 | 0.0 | 0.0 | 1.0 |

== Personal life ==
She is married to Đorđe Krajišnik. She has a degree in psychology.

In December 2024, she expressed support for student protests in Serbia.

== Achievements ==
=== National team ===
- 2021 European Championship

=== Clubs ===
EuroLeague Women

- 2017/18

EuroCup Women

- 2021/22

Russian Premier League

- 2022/23, 2023/24

Russian basketball SuperCup

- 2022, 2023

Russian basketball Cup

- 2022/23

Hungarian League

- 2017/18, 2018/19, 2020/21

Hungarian basketball Cup

- 2015/16, 2018/19, 2019/20, 2020/21
- 2017/18

=== Individual ===
- Serbian Player of the Year – 2022

== See also ==
- List of Serbian WNBA players
