= Bosnia and Herzegovina women's national basketball team =

Bosnia and Herzegovina
- FIBA ranking: 28 ▲1 (18 March 2026)
- Joined FIBA: 1992
- FIBA zone: FIBA Europe
- National federation: KSBIH
- Coach: Emir Halimić

World Cup
- Appearances: 1

EuroBasket
- Appearances: 3
- Medals: None

Mediterranean Games
- Appearances: 1
- Medals: Gold: 1993
Home	Away
Medal record
Mediterranean Games
Gold medal – first place	1993 France	Team

The Bosnia and Herzegovina women's national basketball team represents Bosnia and Herzegovina in international women's basketball competitions, and is governed by the Basketball Federation of Bosnia and Herzegovina. Before the independence in 1992, Bosnian players played for Yugoslavia.

Bosnia and Herzegovina's best result in international competitions so far is a gold medal at the 1993 Mediterranean Games where they beat Italy in the finals. It was also the first major competition the country played in since becoming an independent state.

In 1997 Bosnia and Herzegovina qualified for the first time to EuroBasket winning all six qualifying games and finishing as number one in the group stage. They were later eliminated in the preliminary round of the tournament.

Two years later, in 1999 Bosnia and Herzegovina qualified for the second time in a row to EuroBasket. However they were eliminated once in again in the preliminary round, winning only one of seven games.

In 2021, almost 22 years later, Bosnia and Herzegovina qualified once again to the EuroBasket after making a huge upset in the qualifiers, finishing second. For the first time in Bosnia and Herzegovina's history at EuroBasket they advanced from the group stages, but were later eliminated in the quarterfinals against France with a result of 80–67. They finished the tournament as 5th.

Emir Halimić is the current head coach of the team.

== Competitive record ==
For the results before 1992 see Yugoslavia women's national basketball team.

=== Olympic Games ===
Year	Round	Position	Pld	W	L
(Spain) 1992	Did not qualify				
(United States) 1996	Did not qualify				
(Australia) 2000	Did not qualify				
(Greece) 2004	Did not qualify				
(China) 2008	Did not qualify				
(United Kingdom) 2012	Did not qualify				
(Brazil) 2016	Did not qualify				
(Japan) 2020	Did not qualify				
(France) 2024	Did not qualify				
(United States) 2028	To be determined				
Total	0 Titles	0	0	0	0

=== World Championship ===
Year	Round	Position	Pld	W	L
(Australia) 1994	Did not qualify				
(Germany) 1998	Did not qualify				
(China) 2002	Did not qualify				
(Brazil) 2006	Did not qualify				
(Czech Republic) 2010	Did not qualify				
(Turkey) 2014	Did not qualify				
(Spain) 2018	Did not qualify				
(Australia) 2022	Preliminary round	12th	5	0	5
(Germany) 2026	Did not qualify				
(Japan) 2030	To be determined				
Total	1/10	0	5	0	5

=== EuroBasket ===
Year	Round	Position	Pld	W	L
(Italy) 1993	Wasn't allowed to compete				
(Czech Republic) 1995	Wasn't allowed to compete				
(Hungary) 1997	Preliminary round	12th	7	2	5
(Poland) 1999	Preliminary round	10th	7	1	6
(France) 2001	Did not qualify				
(Greece) 2003	Did not qualify				
(Turkey) 2005	Did not qualify				
(Italy) 2007	Did not qualify				
(Latvia) 2009	Did not qualify				
(Poland) 2011	Did not qualify				
(France) 2013	Did not enter				
(Hungary) (Romania) 2015	Did not enter				
(Czech Republic) 2017	Did not qualify				
(Latvia) (Serbia) 2019	Did not qualify				
(France) (Spain) 2021	Quarter-finals	5th	6	4	2
(Israel) (Slovenia) 2023	Did not qualify				
(Czech Republic) (Germany) (Italy) (Greece) 2025	Did not qualify				
(Belgium) (Finland) (Sweden) (Lithuania) 2027	Did not qualify				
Total	0 Titles	3/14	20	7	13

=== Mediterranean Games ===
Year	Round	Position
(France) 1993	First place	1st
(Italy) 1997	Did not participate	
(Tunisia) 2001	Did not participate	
(Spain) 2005	Did not participate	
(Italy) 2009	Did not participate	
(Turkey) 2013	Cancelled	
(Spain) 2018	Did not participate	
Total	1 Title	Gold medal

== Team ==
=== Current roster ===
Roster for the 2022 FIBA Women's Basketball World Cup.

Bosnia and Herzegovina women's national basketball team – 2022 FIBA Women's Basketball World Cup roster
Players
Coaches

Pos.	No.	Name	Age – Date of birth	Height	Club	Ctr.
PG	4	Milica Deura (C)	32 – 22 July 1990	1.78 m (5 ft 10 in)	BK ŠKP 08 Banská Bystrica	(Slovakia)
PG	5	Miljana Džombeta	28 – 5 July 1994	1.75 m (5 ft 9 in)	Constanța	(Romania)
G	7	Nikolina Knežević	27 – 16 February 1995	1.77 m (5 ft 10 in)	BK Žabiny Brno	(Czech Republic)
G	9	Dragana Domuzin	21 – 3 November 2000	1.74 m (5 ft 9 in)	Slovanka MB	(Czech Republic)
SF	10	Ajla Iskanović	22 – 5 October 1999	1.86 m (6 ft 1 in)	ŽKK RMU Banovići	(Bosnia and Herzegovina)
SG	11	Nikolina Delić	25 – 1 November 1996	1.84 m (6 ft 0 in)	Akson Ilirija	(Slovenia)
C	13	Ajla Selimović	19 – 6 February 2003	1.83 m (6 ft 0 in)	Celta de Vigo Baloncesto	(Spain)
PF	15	Nikolina Elez	27 – 11 August 1995	1.86 m (6 ft 1 in)
C	23	Jovana Marković	25 – 10 January 1997	1.86 m (6 ft 1 in)	ŽKK Budućnost Podgorica	(Montenegro)
SG	24	Matea Tavić	30 – 29 May 1992	1.78 m (5 ft 10 in)	Rutronik Stars Keltern	(Germany)
SG	25	Anđela Delić	25 – 1 November 1996	1.81 m (5 ft 11 in)	Clarinos Tenerife	(Spain)
C	35	Jonquel Jones	28 – 5 January 1994	1.98 m (6 ft 6 in)	New York Liberty	(United States)

Head coach

- (Bosnia and Herzegovina) Goran Lojo

Assistant coach(es)

- (Bosnia and Herzegovina) Armin Šećerović

Legend

- (C) Team captain
- Club – describes last
  club before the tournament
- Age – describes age
  on 22 September 2022

=== Notable players ===
Current notable players from Bosnia and Herzegovina:

Notable players roster
Players
Coaches

Pos.	No.	Name	Age – Date of birth	Height	Club	Ctr.
F		Courtney Hurt	32 – 5 March 1990	1.85 m (6 ft 1 in)	AZS AJP Gorzów Wielkopolski	(Poland)
F		Marina Džinić	30 – 20 July 1992	1.90 m (6 ft 3 in)	Nico Basket	(Italy)
F		Marica Gajić	27 – 27 April 1995	1.85 m (6 ft 1 in)	Flammes Carolo	(France)
F		Nedžla Kovačević	24 – 10 October 1997	1.80 m (5 ft 11 in)	Al-Qazeres Extremadura	(Spain)
F		Melisa Brčaninović	23 – 19 February 1999	1.93 m (6 ft 4 in)	Hozono Global Jairis	(Spain)
G		Irena Vrančić	32 – 21 March 1990	1.73 m (5 ft 8 in)	Horizont Minsk	(Belarus)
F		Milina Mišeljić	24 – 18 March 1998	1.83 m (6 ft 0 in)	ŽKK Crvena zvezda	(Serbia)
G		Sandra Azinović	22 – 2 April 1999	1.76 m (5 ft 9 in)	Flippo Baskets BG 74	(Germany)
C		Gorana Marjanović	21 – 26 March 2000	1.93 m (6 ft 4 in)	ŽKK Partizan	(Serbia)
G		Anđela Gligić	21 – 9 May 2000	1.69 m (5 ft 7 in)	ŽKK Partizan	(Serbia)
C		Sara Heljić	20 – 27 November 2000	1.92 m (6 ft 4 in)	Vasas SC	(Hungary)
F		Dragana Zubac	20 – 6 March 2001	1.82 m (6 ft 0 in)	Hatayspor	(Turkey)
C		Azra Nikšić	18 – 27 August 2003	1.90 m (6 ft 3 in)	ŽKK Play Off Sarajevo	(Bosnia and Herzegovina)

Legend

- Club – describes current club
- Age – describes age
  on 15 November 2021
