= Endéné Miyem =

French basketball player (born 1988)

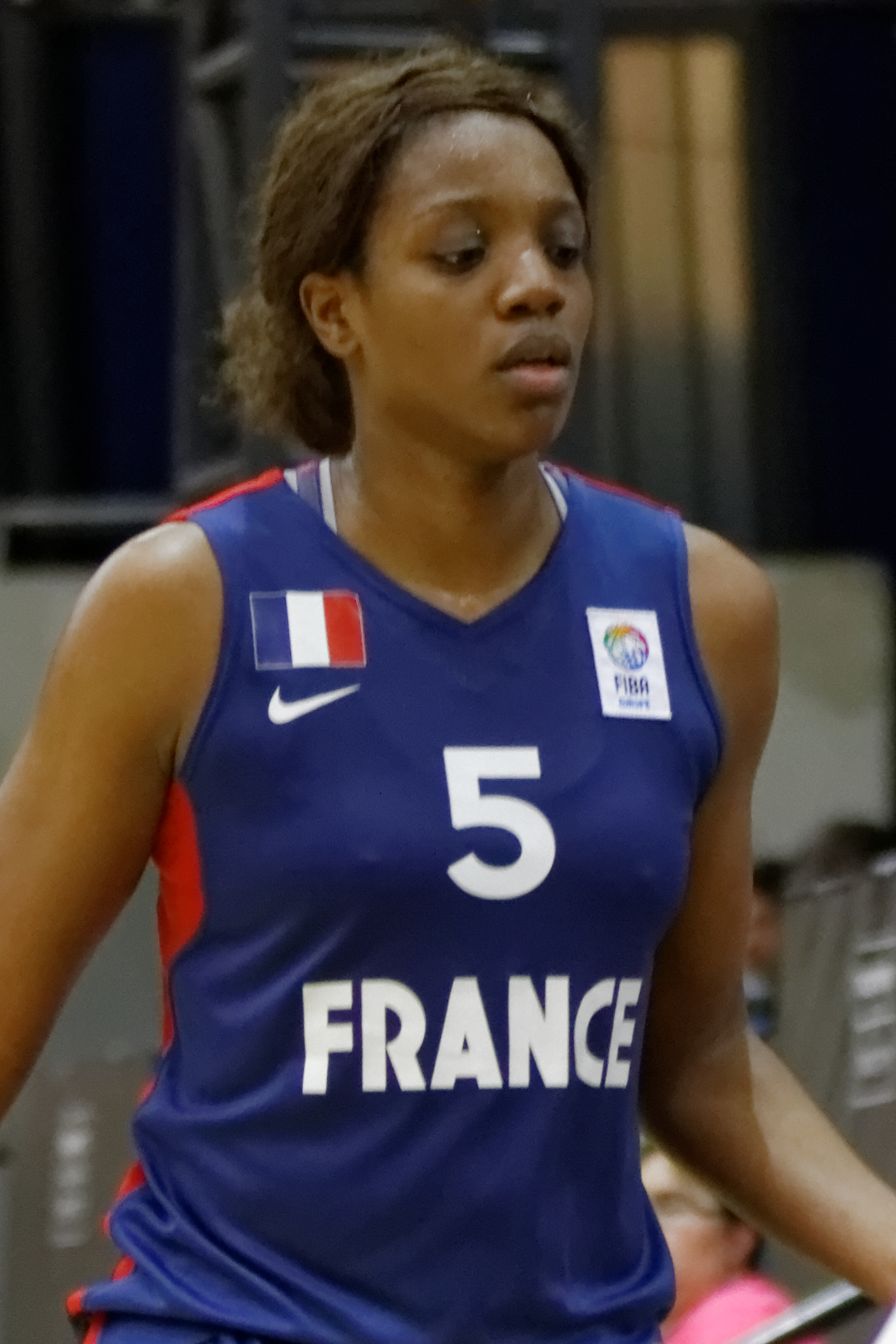
- Miyem in 2013

No. 7 – Tarbes Gespe Bigorre
- Position: Power forward
- League: Ligue Féminine de Basketball

Personal information
- Born: 15 May 1988 (age 38) Reims, France
- Listed height: 6 ft 3 in (1.91 m)
- Listed weight: 203 lb (92 kg)

Career information
- WNBA draft: 2010: undrafted
- Playing career: 2006–present

Career history
- 2006–2015: Tango Bourges Basket
- 2015–2016: Dynamo Kursk
- 2016–2018: PF Schio
- 2018: Minnesota Lynx
- 2018–2019: Lattes Montpellier
- 2019–2021: Flammes Carolo
- 2021–2023: Tango Bourges Basket
- 2023–2024: ASVEL Féminin
- 2024–present: Tarbes Gespe Bigorre
- Stats at WNBA.com
- Stats at Basketball Reference

Nwal-Endéné “Endy” Miyem (born 15 May 1988) is a French professional basketball player. She played from 2016 to 2018 at club level as a power forward for PF Schio. In 2018, she was signed to the Minnesota Lynx after being waived before the regular season. She has played 235 matches for the France women's national basketball team since 2008. She has competed in the 2012 Summer Olympics. where the French won the silver medal. She is 1.91 m (6 ft 3 in) tall.

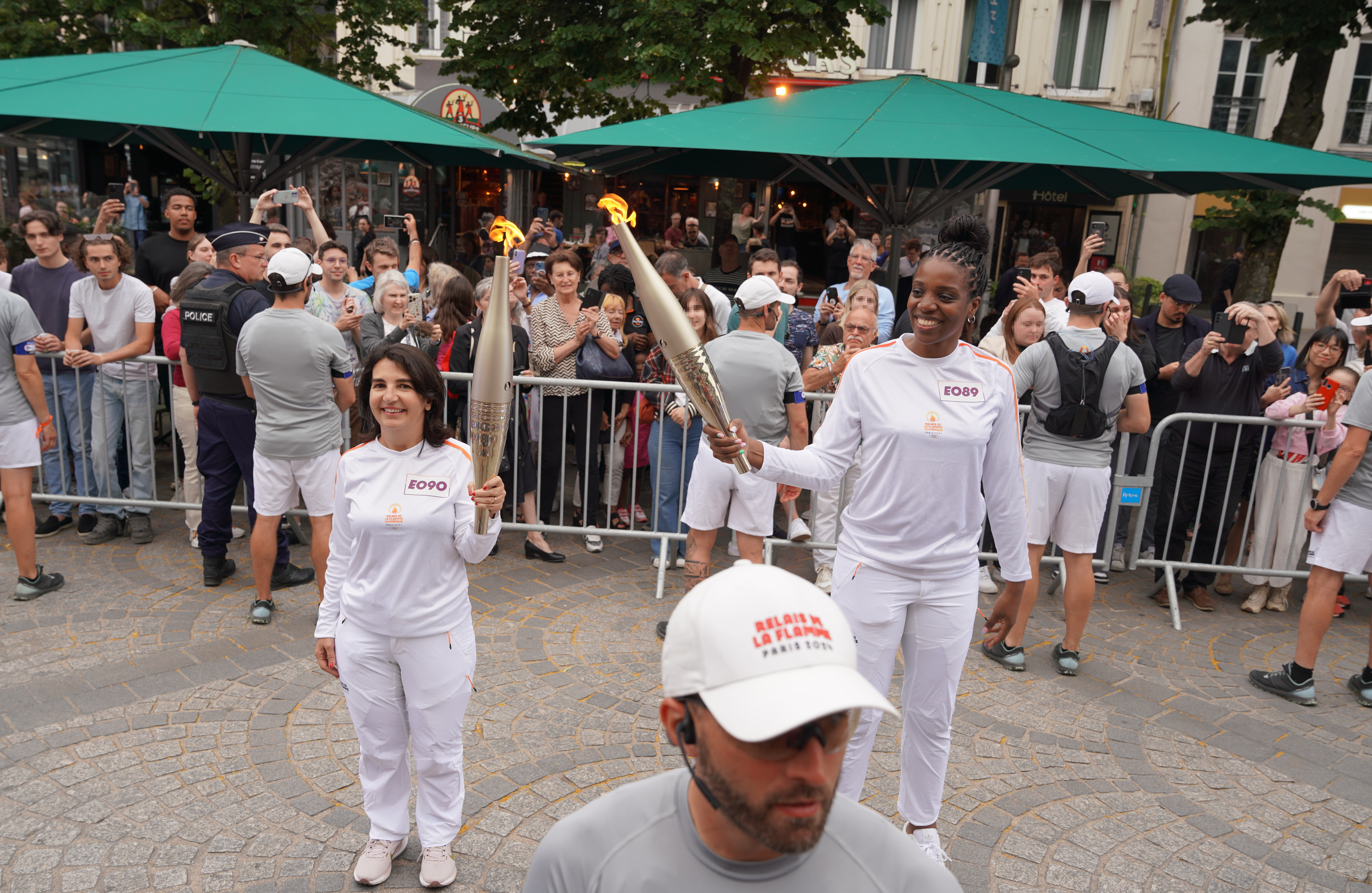
2024 Summer Olympics torch relay

Miyem also supports hip-hop group Eklectik in their "Face Cancer" initiative, a project aimed at raising awareness of cancer through music.

== WNBA career statistics ==
Legend
GP	Games played	GS	Games started	MPG	Minutes per game	RPG	Rebounds per game
APG	Assists per game	SPG	Steals per game	BPG	Blocks per game	PPG	Points per game
TO	Turnovers per game	FG%	Field-goal percentage	3P%	3-point field-goal percentage	FT%	Free-throw percentage
**Bold**	Career best	°	League leader

=== Regular season ===
Year	Team	GP	GS	MPG	FG%	3P%	FT%	RPG	APG	SPG	BPG	TO	PPG
2018	Minnesota	20	1	5.1	.324	.200	1.000	0.6	0.3	0.1	0.1	0.2	1.4
Career	1 year, 1 team	20	1	5.1	.324	.200	1.000	0.6	0.3	0.1	0.1	0.2	1.4
