= Rhénus Sport =

Multi-purpose arena in Strasbourg, France

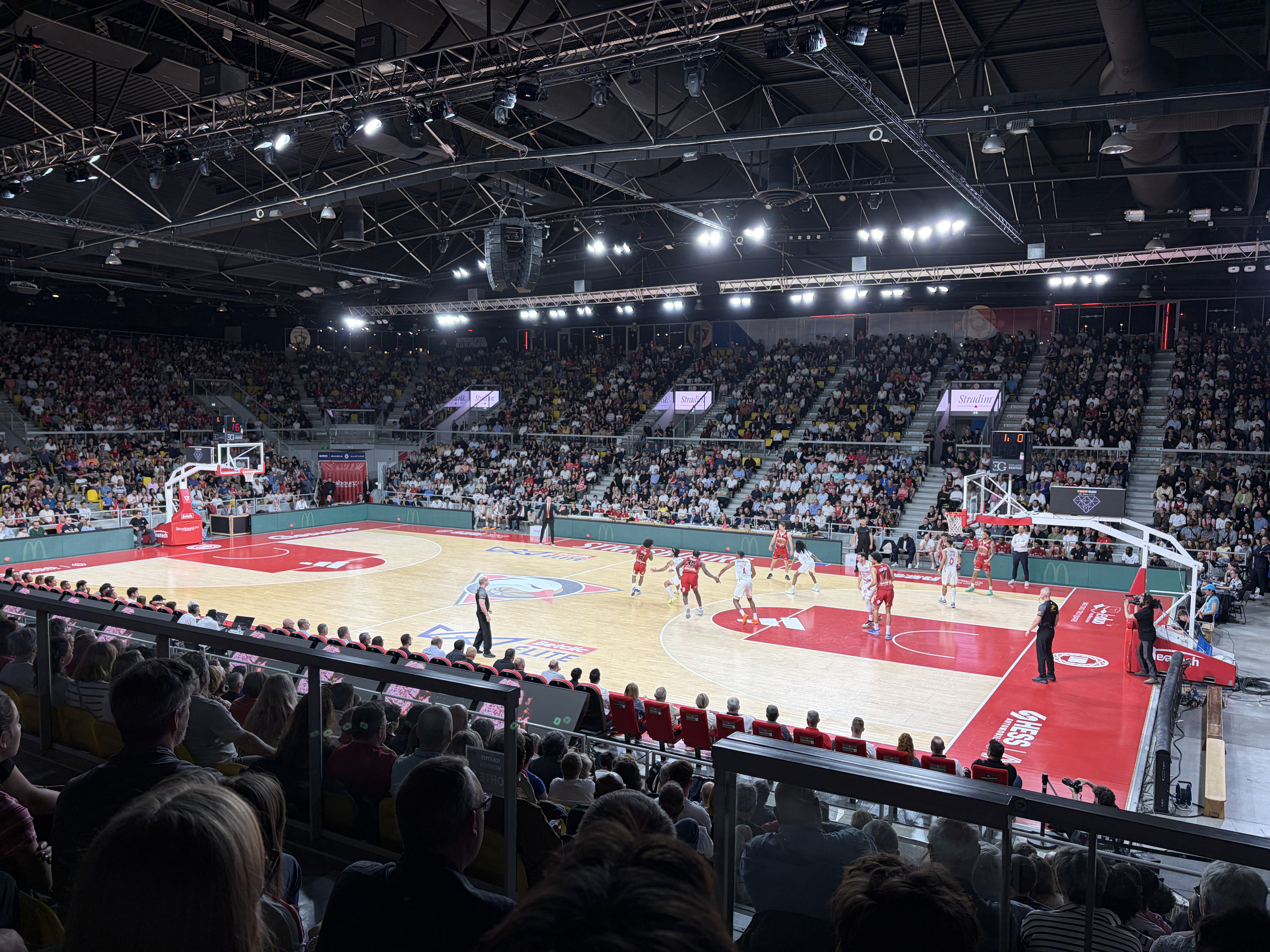
- Interior of the arena (2026)
- Interactive map of Rhénus Sport
- Former names: Hall Rhénus (1974-2001)
- Address: 17 Boulevard de Dresde; 67000 Strasbourg, France
- Location: Contades
- Coordinates: 48.600278°N 7.764722°E
- Capacity: 6,200

Construction
- Opened: 1974
- Renovated: 1987; 2001; 2017

Tenant
- Strasbourg IG (Pro A) (1994–present)

Rhénus Sport (originally Hall Rhénus, also known as Rhénus Sport Arena and Arena de la SIG) is a multi-purpose arena located in Strasbourg, France. The seating capacity is 6,200 for basketball games. It is currently home to the professional French League club Strasbourg IG.

== History ==
The arena opened around 1974. In 1981, the arena was the venue of the European Champions Cup Final, in which Maccabi Tel Aviv defeated Sinudyne Bologna 80–79. In February 2005, the Davis Cup match between France and Sweden took place in this arena. In 2014, the venue hosted the European Fencing Championships. In 2016, it hosted the Fed Cup final.

On April 3, 2009, USA President Barack Obama spoke to a French and German crowd at the arena, while the President was in Strasbourg for the 2009 Strasbourg-Kehl summit.

=== Abandoned plans for renovation and expansion ===
In 2018, it was announced the arena would undergo major renovations and expansion. These will include expanding the arena's capacity to 8,071 in the first phase and to 10.000 in a second phase. The project is estimated to cost 40 million euros. Naming rights have been secured by Crédit Mutuel. The project was estimated to begin in summer 2019 and to be completed by summer 2021, opening as the Crédit Mutuel Forum. However, due to the coronavirus pandemic, the planned completion was postponed to 2023.

However, as of early 2025, construction still hadn't started, and the building permit expired in June 2025, making it unclear whether the project would be realized.

In February 2025, the project was officially cancelled after the owner of the arena couldn't get it financed.

== See also ==
- List of indoor arenas in France

Preceded by Deutschlandhalle; Berlin	FIBA European Champions Cup; Final Venue; 1981	Succeeded by Sporthalle; Cologne
Preceded by O2 Arena; Prague	Fed Cup; Final Venue; 2016	Succeeded by TBD
