= Pavelló Municipal Font de Sant Lluís =

Indoor arena that is in Valencia, Spain

Font de Sant Lluís
- La Fonteta
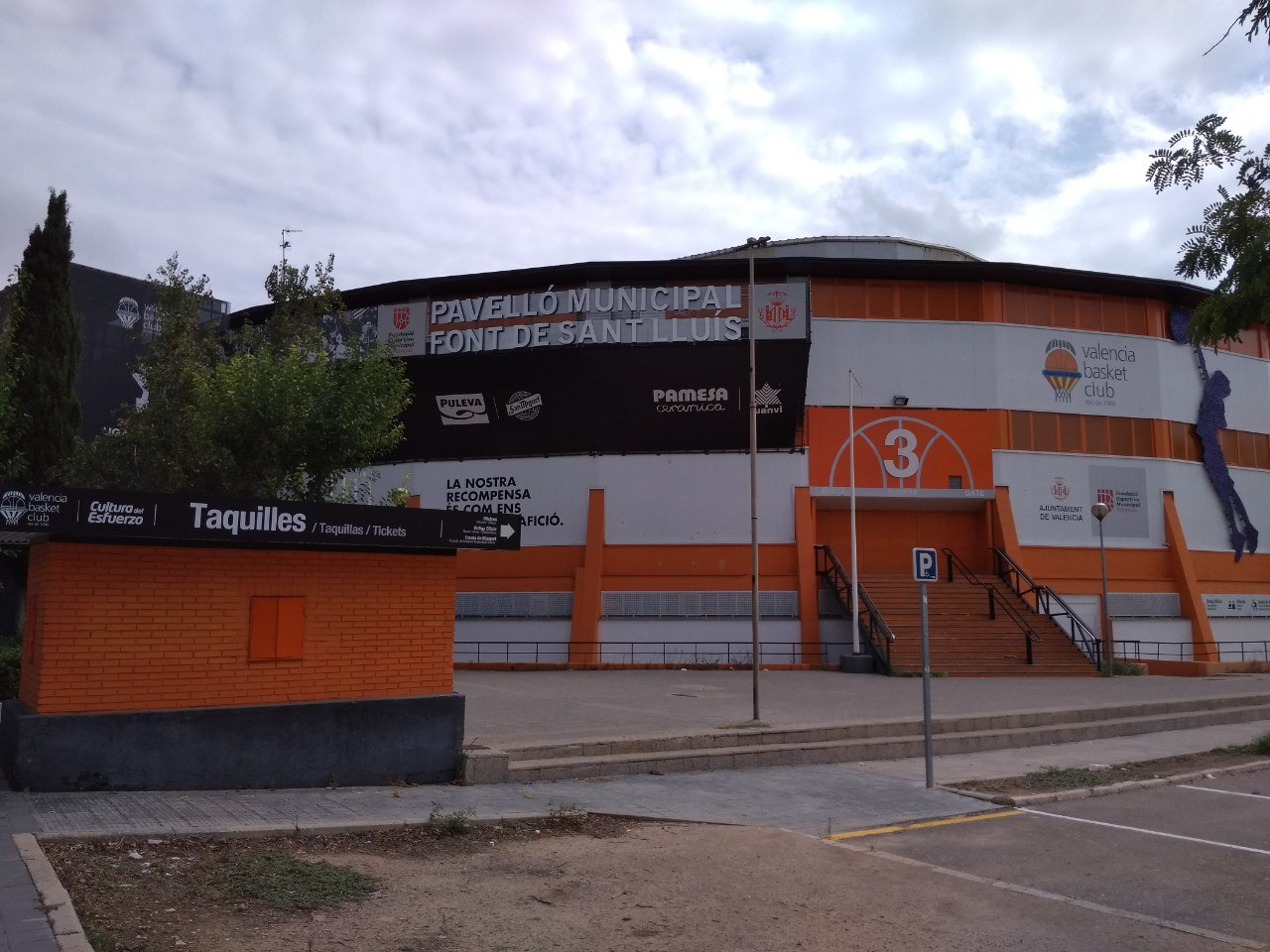
- Exterior of Pavelló Municipal Font de Sant Lluís
- Interactive map of Font de Sant Lluís
- Full name: Pavelló Municipal Font de Sant Lluís
- Coordinates: 39°27′5.83″N 0°21′58.08″W
- Capacity: 9,000
- Surface: Parquet Floor

Construction
- Opened: 1983
- Renovated: 2016

Tenants
- Valencia Basket (1987-2025); Ros Casares Valencia (until 2012)

Pavelló Municipal Font de Sant Lluís (Spanish: Pabellón Municipal Fuente San Luis, known as La Fonteta) is an indoor arena that is located in Valencia, Spain. Built in 1983, was the home arena of the Spanish Liga ACB club Valencia Basket until 2025. The arena has a seating capacity of 9,000 people.

== History ==
La Fonteta was originally built in 1983. Valencia Basket started to play its games in the arena in 1987. The arena was also used as the home arena of the women's basketball team, Ros Casares Valencia, and the futsal team Valencia FS.

On 9 to 11 April 2010, the Fonteta hosted the Final Four of the 2009–10 EuroLeague Women season, where Ros Casares Valencia was defeated in the final by Spartak Moscow Region.

In 2016, Valencia Basket financed the renovation of the arena with €500,000, and also installed a new €150,000 center-hung scoreboard.

It will host several group phase matches for the FIBA Women's EuroBasket 2021 with France and the country.

The construction of the Roig Arena, a new court located in the nearby plot used as parking lot for the attendants to La Fonteta, started in June 2020.

== Gallery ==
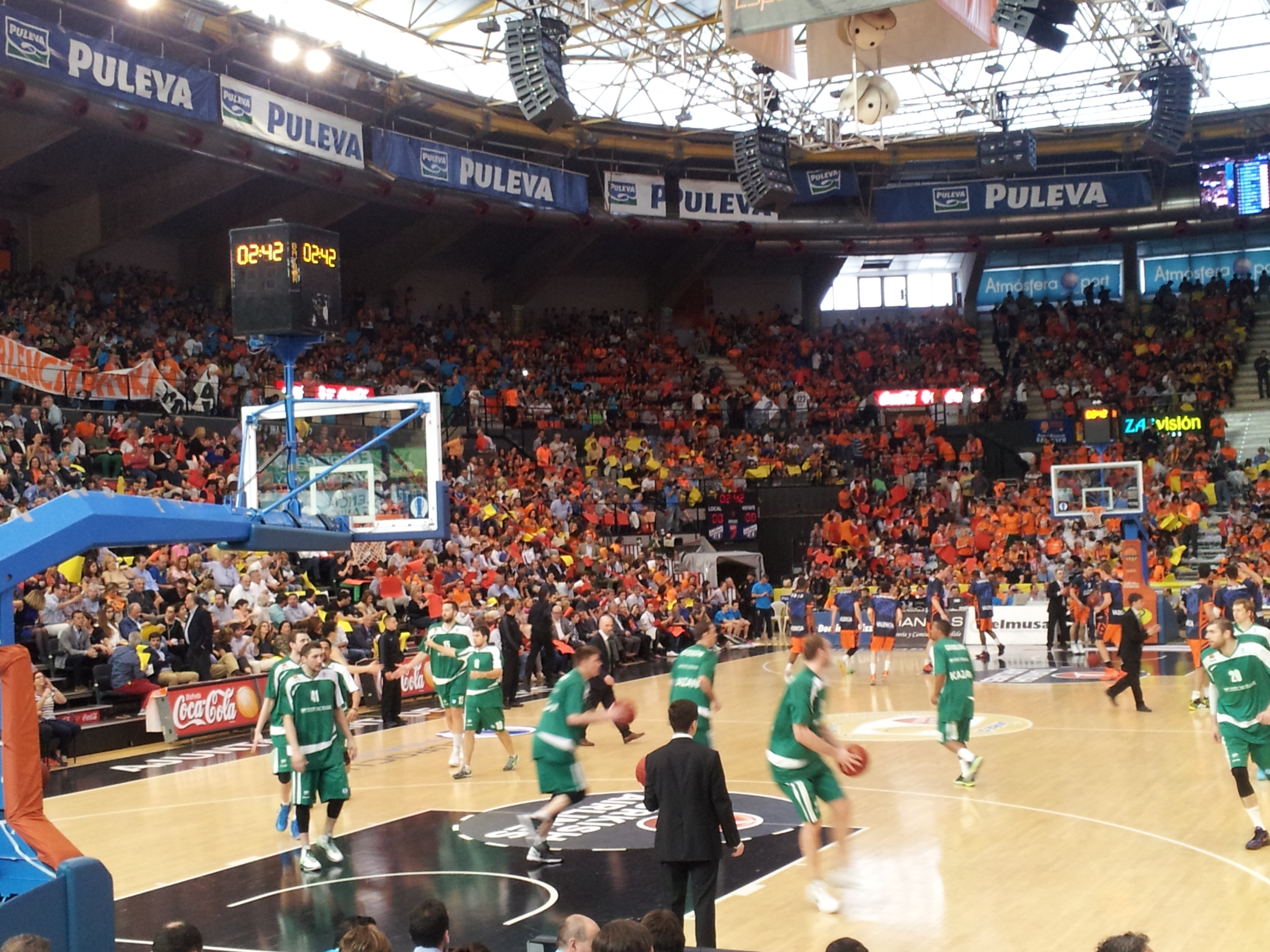
During the 2014 EuroCup Finals game, between Valencia and UNICS Kazan.

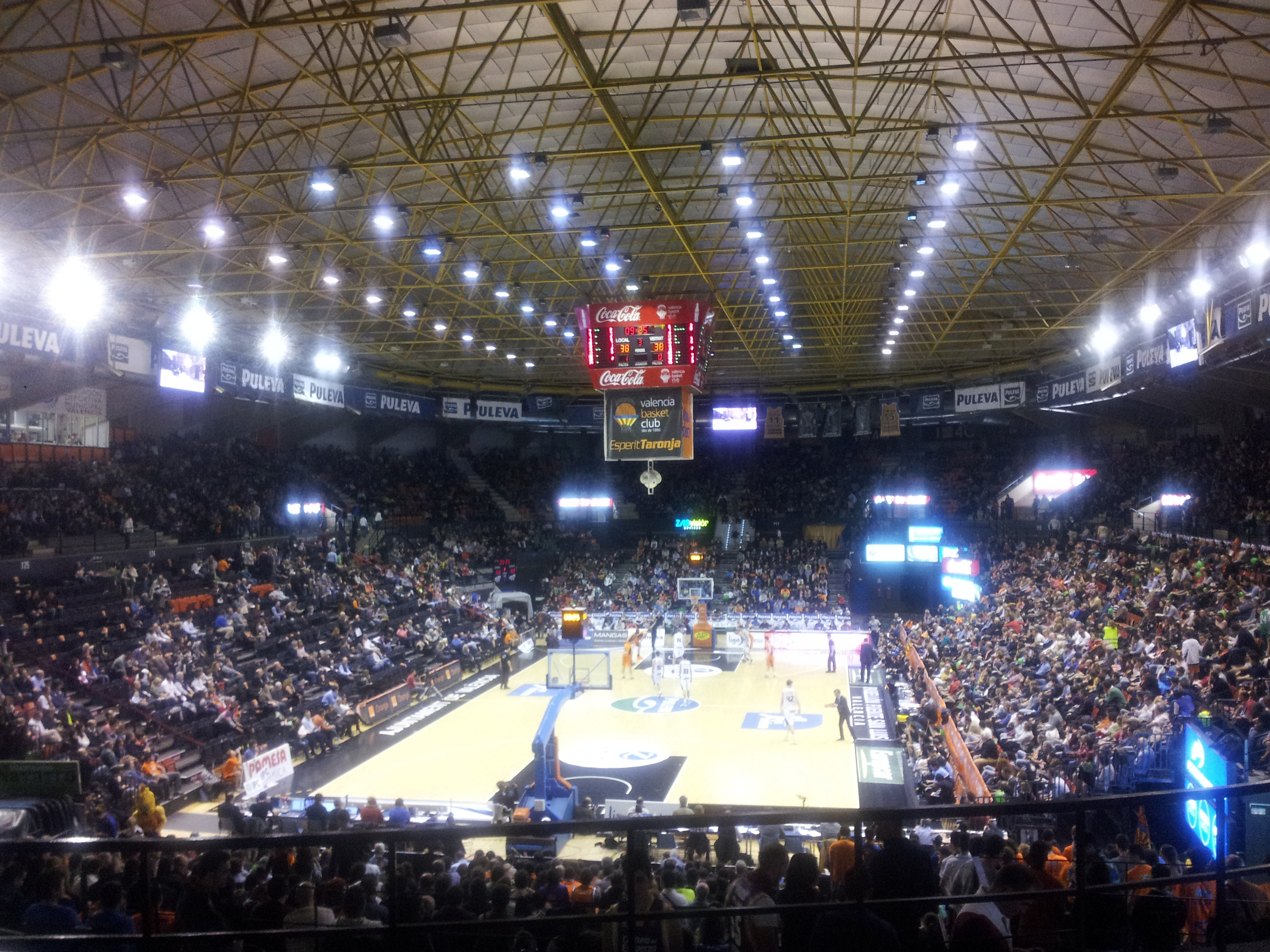
A 2013–14 Spanish ACB League season game between Valencia and Obradoiro.

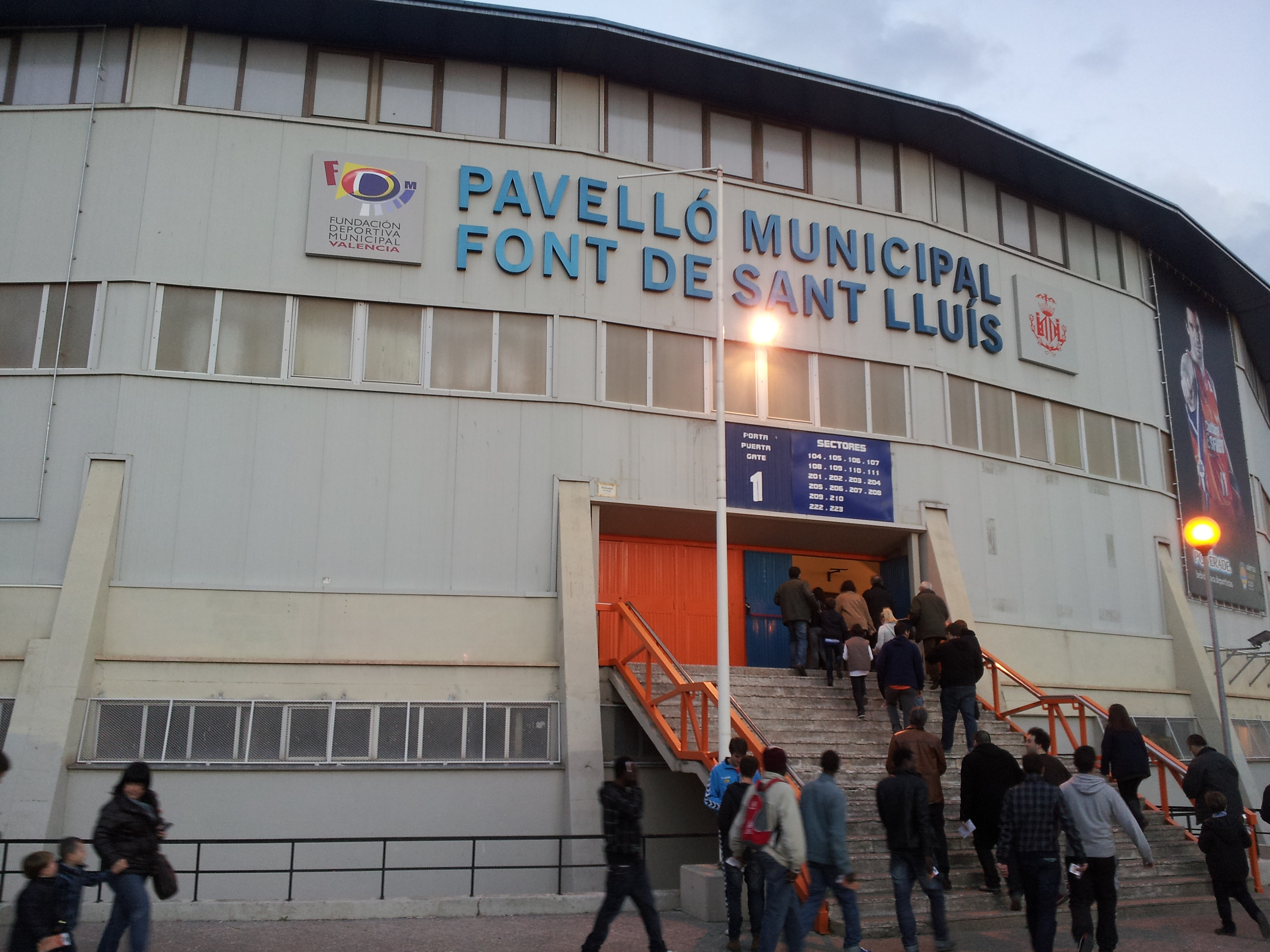

== See also ==
- List of indoor arenas in Spain
