= Valériane Ayayi =

French basketball player

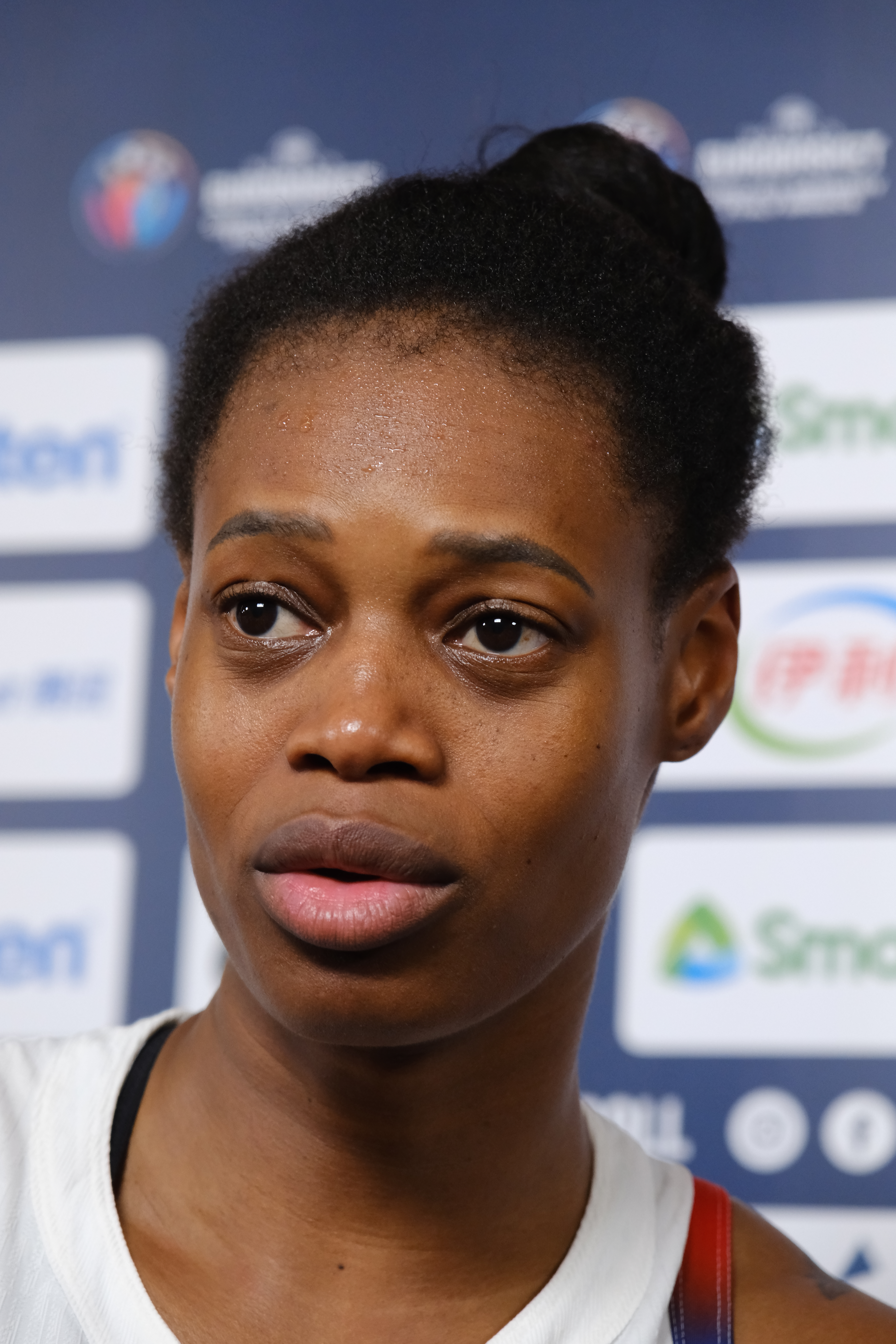
- Ayayi in 2025

No. 11 – Phoenix Mercury
- Position: Small forward
- League: WNBA

Personal information
- Born: 29 April 1994 (age 32) Bordeaux, France
- Listed height: 6 ft 1 in (1.85 m)
- Listed weight: 152 lb (69 kg)

Career information
- WNBA draft: 2015: undrafted

Career history
- 2012–2014: Basket Landes
- 2014–2016: Basket Lattes
- 2015: San Antonio Stars
- 2016–2017: ESB Villeneuve-d'Ascq
- 2017–2018: Tango Bourges Basket
- 2018–2020: USK Praha
- 2020–2022: Basket Landes
- 2022–2026: USK Praha
- 2026–present: Phoenix Mercury

Career highlights
- EuroLeague Women champion (2025); FIBA Europe SuperCup Women winner (2025); 4× Ligue Féminine champion (2016, 2017, 2018, 2021); 4× Coupe de France Féminine winner (2015, 2016, 2018, 2022); 6× Czech Basketball League champion (2019, 2020, 2023, 2024, 2025, 2026)
- Stats at Basketball Reference
Medals
Women's basketball
Representing France
Olympic Games
Silver medal – second place	2024 Paris	Team
Bronze medal – third place	2020 Tokyo	Team
FIBA World Cup
Silver medal – second place	2026 Germany
EuroBasket
Silver medal – second place	2013 France
Silver medal – second place	2017 Czech Republic
Silver medal – second place	2019 Serbia/Latvia
Silver medal – second place	2021 Spain/France
Bronze medal – third place	2023 Israel/Slovenia

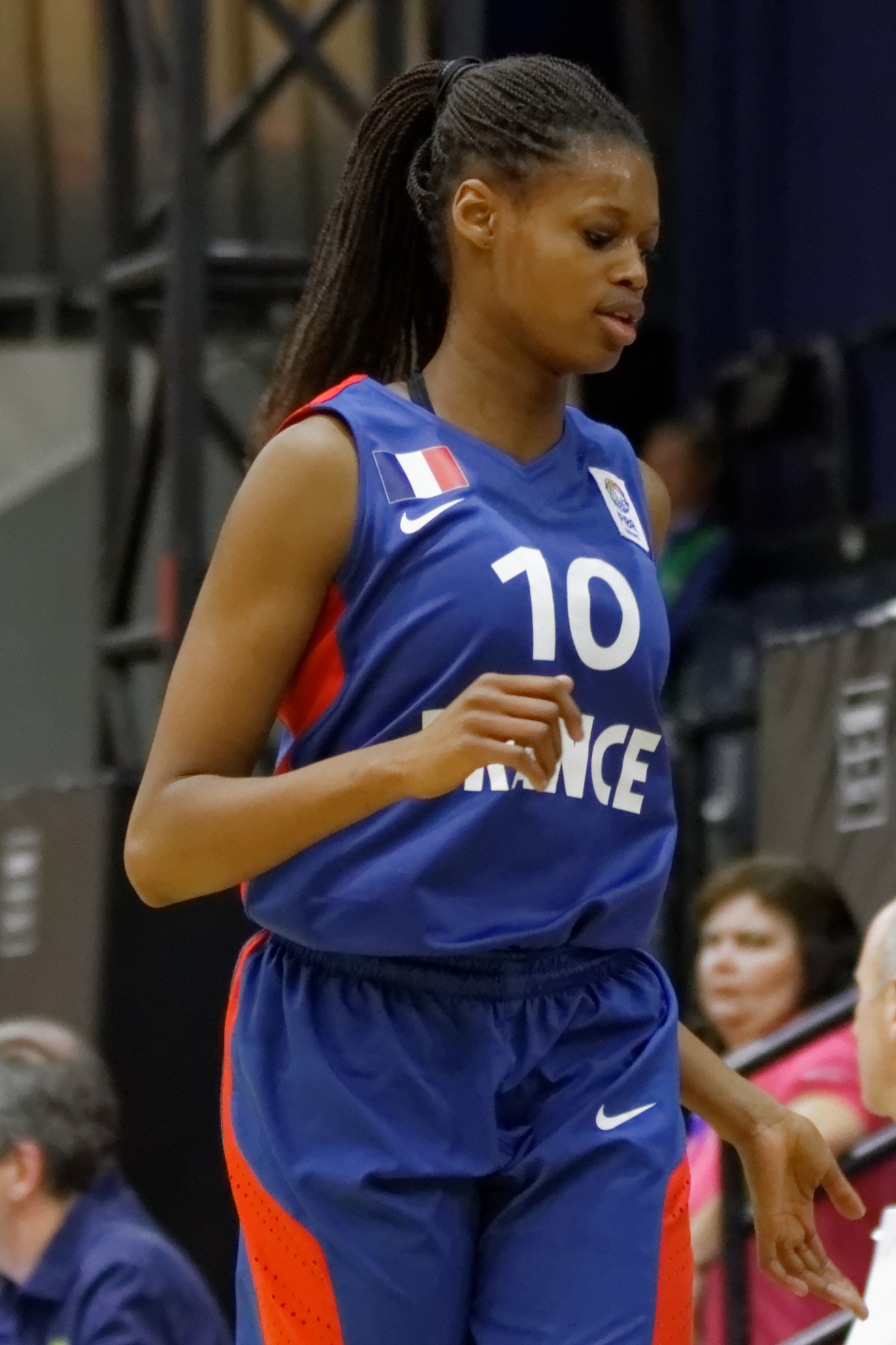
Ayayi in 2013

Valériane Ayayi (born 29 April 1994) is a French professional basketball player for the Phoenix Mercury of the Women's National Basketball Association (WNBA) and for USK Praha. She previously played for the San Antonio Stars of the Women's National Basketball Association (WNBA).

== Career statistics ==
Legend
GP	Games played	GS	Games started	MPG	Minutes per game	RPG	Rebounds per game
APG	Assists per game	SPG	Steals per game	BPG	Blocks per game	PPG	Points per game
TO	Turnovers per game	FG%	Field-goal percentage	3P%	3-point field-goal percentage	FT%	Free-throw percentage
**Bold**	Career best	°	League leader

=== WNBA ===
WNBA regular season statistics
Year	Team	GP	GS	MPG	FG%	3P%	FT%	RPG	APG	SPG	BPG	TO	PPG
2015	San Antonio	16	0	9.2	.313	.190	.429	1.8	0.4	0.5	0.3	0.6	2.3
**Career**	1 year, 1 team	16	0	9.2	.313	.190	.429	1.8	0.4	0.5	0.3	0.6	2.3

== Personal life ==
Ayayi is of Beninese descent. Her father played basketball professionally in France and also for the Beninese national team. Ayayi's younger brother, Joël, played college basketball at Gonzaga University in the United States and professionally in the Los Angeles Lakers summer league and with the Washington Wizards, and has also represented France at youth level. Ayayi's younger sister, Laure, also played the sport, and Laure's twin brother, Gérald, played in the third division of professional basketball in France.

Ayayi is married to professional Serbian basketball player, Filip Vukosavljević. After the conclusion of the 2020 Olympics, Ayayi revealed that she competed in the tournament while she was three and a half months pregnant with her first child. In January 2022, she gave birth to her daughter, Alani, and two and a half months later made her return playing for Basket Landes.
