= EuroBasket Women 2017 final round =

The final round of the EuroBasket Women 2017 took place between 20 and 25 June 2017 with all games played at O2 Arena in Prague, except the qualification for quarter-finals with two games between the teams of group C and D at Kralovka Arena in Prague and two games between the teams of groups A and B were played at Zimní stadion Hradec Králové in Hradec Králové, Czech Republic.

== Qualified teams ==
The group winners qualified for the quarterfinals while the runners-up and third placed teams advanced to the qualification round.

Group	Winners	Runners-up	Third Place
A	Spain	Ukraine	Hungary
B	Turkey	Italy	Slovakia
C	France	Serbia	Greece
D	Belgium	Russia	Latvia

== Bracket ==
Qualification for quarterfinals
20 June 2017
Serbia	70
Latvia	75
20 June 2017
Italy	49
Hungary	48
20 June 2017
Russia	58
Greece	62
20 June 2017
Ukraine	68
Slovakia	82

Quarterfinals
22 June 2017
Spain	67
Latvia	47
22 June 2017
Belgium	79
Italy	66
22 June 2017
Turkey	55
Greece	84
22 June 2017
France	67
Slovakia	40

Semifinals
24 June 2017
Spain	68
Belgium	52
24 June 2017
Greece	55
France	77

Final
25 June 2017
Spain	71
France	55
Third place game
25 June 2017
Belgium	78
Greece	45

5–8th place bracket

5–8th place semifinals
24 June 2017
Latvia	68
Italy	67
24 June 2017
Turkey	72
Slovakia	56

Fifth place game
25 June 2017
Latvia	63
Turkey	72
Seventh place game
25 June 2017
Italy	71
Slovakia	54

== Qualification for quarterfinals ==
20 June 2017
18:00

Boxscore

Ukraine	68–82	Slovakia
Scoring by quarter: 16–22, 13–12, 27–23, 12–25
Pts: Iagupova 24; Rebs: Udodenko 6 Asts: Iagupova 7		Pts: Žirková 31; Rebs: Růžičková 13; Asts: Žirková 7

Zimní stadion Hradec Králové, Hradec Králové
Attendance: 1,035
Referees: Boris Krejić (SLO), Tanel Suslov (EST), Vasiliki Tsaroucha (GRE)

20 June 2017
18:00

Boxscore

Serbia	70–75	Latvia
Scoring by quarter: 12–24, 20–10, 19–19, 19–22
Pts: Radočaj 14; Rebs: Jovanović 8 Asts: Radočaj 3		Pts: Vītola 19; Rebs: Šteinberga 11; Asts: Baško, Šteinberga 4

Kralovka Arena, Prague
Attendance: 750
Referees: Maj Forsberg (DEN), Luis Castillo (ESP), Fabiana Martinescu-Badalan (ROU)

20 June 2017
20:30

Boxscore

Italy	49–48	Hungary
Scoring by quarter: 12–14, 17–7, 5–19, 15–8
Pts: Zandalasini 17; Rebs: Ress 11; Asts: three players 2		Pts: Krivačević 15; Rebs: Nagy-Bujdosó, Krivačević 8 Asts: Nagy-Bujdosó 4

Zimní stadion Hradec Králové, Hradec Králové
Attendance: 1,049
Referees: Jasmina Juras (SRB), Sergei Beliakov (RUS), Mārtiņš Kozlovskis (LAT)

20 June 2017
20:30

Boxscore

Russia	58–62	Greece
Scoring by quarter: 15–19, 17–9, 4–22, 22–12
Pts: Vadeeva 18; Rebs: Vadeeva 21; Asts: Prince 5		Pts: Kaltsidou 24; Rebs: Kaltsidou 9 Asts: Maltsi, Nikolopoulou 4

Kralovka Arena, Prague
Attendance: 700
Referees: Janusz Calik (POL), Michele Rossi (ITA), Ventsislav Velikov (BUL)

== Quarterfinals ==
22 June 2017
12:30

Boxscore

Belgium	79–66	Italy
Scoring by quarter: 27–13, 19–20, 11–22, 22–11
Pts: Meesseman 28; Rebs: Meesseman 11; Asts: K. Mestdagh 8		Pts: Zandalasini 23; Rebs: Zandalasini 8 Asts: Cinili 2

O2 Arena, Prague
Attendance: 800
Referees: Fabiana Martinescu-Badalan (ROU), Zdravko Rutešić (MNE), Tanel Suslov (EST)

22 June 2017
15:00

Boxscore

Turkey	55–84	Greece
Scoring by quarter: 15–10, 15–26, 10–21, 15–27
Pts: Hollingsworth 15; Rebs: Hollingsworth 10; Asts: Alben, Vardarlı 3		Pts: Maltsi 25; Rebs: Maltsi 10; Asts: Lymoura 10

O2 Arena, Prague
Attendance: 1,081
Referees: Jasmina Juras (SRB), Maj Forsberg (DEN), Boris Krejić (SLO)

22 June 2017
18:00

Boxscore

Spain	67–47	Latvia
Scoring by quarter: 27–12, 11–10, 12–14, 17–11
Pts: Torrens 20; Rebs: Torrens 9 Asts: Torrens 3		Pts: Putnina 15; Rebs: Šteinberga 10; Asts: Krastiņa 4

O2 Arena, Prague
Attendance: 1,500
Referees: Yohan Rosso (FRA), Vasiliki Tsaroucha (GRE), Ventsislav Velikov (BUL)

22 June 2017
20:30

Boxscore

France	67–40	Slovakia
Scoring by quarter: 21–6, 18–18, 11–8, 17–8
Pts: Ayayi 13; Rebs: Dumerc 8 Asts: Dumerc 4		Pts: Bálintová 13; Rebs: Oroszová 8 Asts: Jurčenková 5

O2 Arena, Prague
Attendance: 1,700
Referees: Michele Rossi (ITA), Luis Castillo (ESP), Mārtiņš Kozlovskis (LAT)

== 5–8th place semifinals ==
24 June 2017
12:30

Boxscore

Latvia	68–67	Italy
Scoring by quarter: 18–18, 19–24, 16–11, 15–14
Pts: Putniņa 15; Rebs: Vītola 8 Asts: Krastiņa, Šteinberga 4		Pts: Zandalasini 25; Rebs: Zandalasini 14; Asts: Sottana 7

O2 Arena, Prague
Attendance: 300
Referees: Luis Castillo (ESP), Jasmina Juras (SRB), Maripier Malo (CAN)

24 June 2017
15:00

Boxscore

Turkey	72–56	Slovakia
Scoring by quarter: 16–9, 16–19, 25–11, 15–17
Pts: Hollingsworth 20; Rebs: Canıtez 8 Asts: Vardarlı 10		Pts: Bálintová 12; Rebs: Růžičková 9 Asts: Bálintová 4

O2 Arena, Prague
Attendance: 500
Referees: Yohan Rosso (FRA), Maj Forsberg (DEN), Tanel Suslov (EST)

== Semifinals ==
24 June 2017
18:00

Boxscore

Spain	68–52	Belgium
Scoring by quarter: 20–11, 16–10, 16–12, 16–19
Pts: Torrens 20; Rebs: Torrens 10; Asts: Lyttle, Palau 4		Pts: Vanloo 11; Rebs: Meesseman 6 Asts: Meesseman 5

O2 Arena, Prague
Attendance: 1,900
Referees: Boris Krejić (SLO), Mārtiņš Kozlovskis (LAT), Ventsislav Velikov (BUL)

24 June 2017
20:30

Boxscore

Greece	55–77	France
Scoring by quarter: 17–23, 13–12, 17–17, 8–25
Pts: Kaltsidou 15; Rebs: Spanou 5 Asts: Maltsi 4		Pts: Miyem 13; Rebs: Ciak 10; Asts: Époupa 4

O2 Arena, Prague
Attendance: 2,400
Referees: Janusz Calik (POL), Sergei Beliakov (RUS), Fabiana Martinescu-Badalan (ROU)

== Seventh place game ==
25 June 2017
12:30

Boxscore

Italy	71–54	Slovakia
Scoring by quarter: 19–8, 17–20, 18–16, 17–10
Pts: Gorini 14; Rebs: Ress 7 Asts: Ress 5		Pts: Růžičková 10; Rebs: Oroszová 8 Asts: Slamová 4

O2 Arena, Prague
Attendance: 250
Referees: Sergei Beliakov (RUS), Tanel Suslov (EST), Vasiliki Tsaroucha (GRE)

== Fifth place game ==
25 June 2017
15:00

Boxscore

Latvia	63–72	Turkey
Scoring by quarter: 12–18, 15–25, 19–12, 17–17
Pts: Šteinberga 16; Rebs: Šteinberga 8 Asts: Baško 4		Pts: Hollingsworth 24; Rebs: Alben, Canıtez 8 Asts: Alben 7

O2 Arena, Prague
Attendance: 600
Referees: Ilona Kučerová (CZE), Andrada Csender (ROU), Gellért Kapitány (HUN)

== Third place game ==
25 June 2017
18:00

Boxscore

Belgium	78–45	Greece
Scoring by quarter: 24–15, 16–14, 21–7, 17–9
Pts: K. Mestdagh 18; Rebs: Raman, Wauters 8 Asts: Carpreaux 8		Pts: Maltsi 13; Rebs: Maltsi 8 Asts: Maltsi, Sotiriou 2

O2 Arena, Prague
Attendance: 3,100
Referees: Boris Krejić (SLO), Maj Forsberg (DEN), Mārtiņš Kozlovskis (LAT)

== Final ==
25 June 2017
20:30

Boxscore

Spain	71–55	France
Scoring by quarter: 21–18, 18–12, 17–10, 15–15
Pts: Lyttle 19; Rebs: Lyttle 8 Asts: Cruz 5		Pts: Dumerc 15; Rebs: Époupa, Amant 4 Asts: four players 2

O2 Arena, Prague
Attendance: 4,500
Referees: Janusz Calik (POL), Michele Rossi (ITA), Özlem Yalman (TUR)
