= EuroBasket Women 2023 qualification =

The EuroBasket Women 2023 qualification was held from November 2021 to February 2023 to decide the 14 teams to join the co-hosts Israel and Slovenia at the 2023 European Women Basketball Championship. It featured 38 teams split in ten groups of three or four teams. The ten group winners and the four best second-ranked teams qualified for the final tournament.

== Draw ==
The draw took place on 20 August 2021.

=== Seeding ===
Teams were seeded according to FIBA rankings.

Pot 1
Team	Pos
Spain	2
France	3
Belgium	6
Serbia	9
Turkey	10

Pot 2
Team	Pos
Belarus	11
Russia	12
Italy	13
Greece	15
Sweden	18

Pot 3
Team	Pos
Montenegro	20
Great Britain	21
Czech Republic	22
Slovakia	23
Latvia	24

Pot 4
Team	Pos
Slovenia	25
Ukraine	26
Bosnia and Herzegovina	27
Hungary	28
Croatia	29

Pot 5
Team	Pos
Lithuania	33
Poland	39
Germany	40
Bulgaria	45
Romania	47

Pot 6
Team	Pos
Netherlands	49
Israel	50
Portugal	52
Luxembourg	56
Denmark	57

Pot 7
Team	Pos
Switzerland	58
Ireland	60
Austria	61
Estonia	62

Pot 8
Team	Pos
Finland	64
Iceland	68
North Macedonia	79
Albania	102

== Groups ==
All times are local.

=== Group A ===
Pos	Team	Pld	W	L	PF	PA	PD	Pts	Qualification
1	Belgium	6	5	1	548	330	+218	11	Final tournament
2	Germany	6	4	2	432	360	+72	10	Final tournament
3	Bosnia and Herzegovina	6	2	4	412	502	−90	8	
4	North Macedonia	6	1	5	304	504	−200	7	

Source: FIBA
Rules for classification: 1) Points; 2) Head-to-head; 3) Points difference; 4) Points scored.

11 November 2021	Germany	73–41	North Macedonia	Halle
19:30	Scoring by quarter: 14–18, 12–12, 28–7, 19–4
	Pts: Geiselsöder 16; Rebs: Fiebich 11; Asts: Brunckhorst, Fiebich 6	Boxscore	Pts: Mitrashinovikj 16; Rebs: three players 4 Asts: Nikolikj, Petkovska 3	Arena: SWH.arena; Referees: Cecília Tóth (HUN), Nikola Bejat (NOR), Ariadna Chueva (ESP)

11 November 2021	Bosnia and Herzegovina	87–81	Belgium	Sarajevo
20:00	Scoring by quarter: 19–20, 32–19, 22–10, 14–32
	Pts: Jones 44; Rebs: Jones 22; Asts: Jones 4	Boxscore	Pts: Vanloo 19; Rebs: Linskens 9 Asts: Meesseman 5	Arena: Mirza Delibašić Hall; Referees: Özlem Yalman (TUR), Ciprian Stoica (ROU), Silvia Marziali (ITA)

14 November 2021	Belgium	84–55	Germany	Kortrijk
16:00	Scoring by quarter: 12–16, 20–16, 26–13, 26–10
	Pts: Meesseman 25; Rebs: Meesseman 11; Asts: Allemand 6	Boxscore	Pts: Guelich 17; Rebs: Fiebich, Greinacher 5 Asts: Brunckhorst 5	Arena: Sportcampus Lange Munte; Referees: Vilius Mačiulaitis (LTU), Esperanza Mendoza (ESP), Valentin Oliot (FRA)

14 November 2021	North Macedonia	64–80	Bosnia and Herzegovina	Skopje
19:00	Scoring by quarter: 15–23, 19–24, 11–18, 19–15
	Pts: Mitrashinovikj 24; Rebs: Bonner 9 Asts: Mitrashinovikj 4	Boxscore	Pts: Jones 30; Rebs: Jones 17; Asts: Tavić 6	Arena: SRC Kale; Referees: Kerem Baki (TUR), Amalia Marchis (ROU), Mehmet Karabilecen (TUR)

24 November 2022	Germany	97–58	Bosnia and Herzegovina	Weißenfels
19:00	Scoring by quarter: 22–16, 27–23, 29–8, 19–11
	Pts: Guelich 18; Rebs: Fiebich 10; Asts: Fiebich 9	Boxscore	Pts: Hurt 17; Rebs: Hurt 6 Asts: Delić, Knežević 5	Arena: Stadthalle Weißenfels; Referees: Gatis Saliņš (LAT), Emma Perry (IRL), Anastasios Kardaris (GRE)

24 November 2022	Belgium	112–41	North Macedonia	Leuven
20:30	Scoring by quarter: 34–3, 23–13, 24–10, 31–15
	Pts: Meesseman 17; Rebs: Linskens 13; Asts: Vanloo 6	Boxscore	Pts: Antić 15; Rebs: Antic 6 Asts: Stojanovska 3	Arena: Sportplaza Leuven; Referees: Amel Dahra (FRA), Ewa Matuszewska (POL), Niamh Callaghan (IRL)

27 November 2022	Belgium	100–60	Bosnia and Herzegovina	Leuven
16:15	Scoring by quarter: 27–12, 26–14, 20–18, 27–16
	Pts: Meesseman, Vanloo 20; Rebs: Meesseman 9 Asts: Vanloo 14	Boxscore	Pts: Hurt 15; Rebs: Hurt 7 Asts: Babić 5	Arena: Sportplaza Leuven; Referees: Alexandre Deman (FRA), Mihkel Männiste (EST), Çisil Güngör (TUR)

27 November 2022	North Macedonia	47–71	Germany	Skopje
19:00	Scoring by quarter: 16–18, 19–9, 9–19, 3–25
	Pts: Hempe 20; Rebs: Kmetovska, Stojanovska 5 Asts: Antić 5	Boxscore	Pts: Fiebich 23; Rebs: Fiebich 13; Asts: Bär 6	Arena: SRC Kale; Referees: Özge Şentürk (TUR), Ventsislav Velikov (BUL), Dimitrios Zacharis (GRE)

9 February 2023	Germany	44–69	Belgium	Wolfenbüttel
19:00	Scoring by quarter: 9–22, 10–12, 13–15, 12–20
	Pts: Gülich, Wilke 10; Rebs: Brunckhorst 7 Asts: Greinacher, Wilke 2	Boxscore	Pts: Meesseman 19; Rebs: Vanloo 6 Asts: Delaere 6	Arena: Lindenhalle Wolfenbüttel; Referees: Ariadna Chueva (ESP), Gintaras Vitkauskas (LTU), Gintaras Mačiulis (LTU)

9 February 2023	Bosnia and Herzegovina	66–68	North Macedonia	Sarajevo
20:00	Scoring by quarter: 10–15, 16–15, 17–19, 23–19
	Pts: Hurt 21; Rebs: Hurt 15; Asts: Delić 6	Boxscore	Pts: Mitrashinovikj 18; Rebs: Trajchevska 9 Asts: three players 4	Arena: KSC Ilidža; Referees: Amel Dahra (FRA), Mladen Lučić (MNE), Diana Lapanović (SLO)

12 February 2023	North Macedonia	43–102	Belgium	Skopje
18:00	Scoring by quarter: 5–28, 13–18, 14–23, 11–33
	Pts: Mitrashinovikj 15; Rebs: Mitrashinovikj 6 Asts: Stojanovska 3	Boxscore	Pts: Meesseman 17; Rebs: Meesseman 14; Asts: Vanloo 7	Arena: SRC Kale; Referees: Nemanja Ninković (SRB), Dimitrios Zacharis (GRE), Eirini Tsantali (GRE)

12 February 2023	Bosnia and Herzegovina	61–92	Germany	Sarajevo
20:00	Scoring by quarter: 15–30, 22–14, 12–24, 12–24
	Pts: Knezević 17; Rebs: Hurt 11; Asts: three players 2	Boxscore	Pts: Fiebich 30; Rebs: Gülich 9 Asts: Brunckhorst 11	Arena: KSC Ilidža; Referees: Mehmet Karabilecen (TUR), Zdenko Tomašovič (SVK), Ali Şakacı (TUR)

=== Group B ===
Pos	Team	Pld	W	L	PF	PA	PD	Pts	Qualification
1	France	6	5	1	531	432	+99	11	Final tournament
2	Ukraine	6	4	2	462	456	+6	10	
3	Lithuania	6	3	3	411	414	−3	9	
4	Finland	6	0	6	368	470	−102	6	

Source: FIBA
Rules for classification: 1) Points; 2) Head-to-head; 3) Points difference; 4) Points scored.

11 November 2021	Lithuania	69–59	Finland	Kėdainiai
19:00	Scoring by quarter: 20–17, 15–7, 19–15, 15–20
	Pts: Nacickaitė, Petronytė 16; Rebs: Labuckienė 10; Asts: Nacickaitė 4	Boxscore	Pts: Kuier 21; Rebs: Kuier 14; Asts: Pekonen 4	Arena: Kėdainiai Arena; Referees: Andrada Csender (ROU), Geert Jacobs (BEL), Silvia Jury (AUT)

11 November 2021	Ukraine	90–71	France	Kyiv
19:00	Scoring by quarter: 31–23, 23–14, 17–18, 19–16
	Pts: Iagupova 33; Rebs: Yurkevichus 19; Asts: Dubrovina 12	Boxscore	Pts: Miyem 16; Rebs: Gruda 7 Asts: Hériaud, Johannès 4	Arena: Palace of Sports; Referees: Andrei Sharapa (BLR), Josip Jurčević (CRO), Amalia Marchis (ROU)

14 November 2021	France	83–56	Lithuania	Villeneuve-d'Ascq
16:30	Scoring by quarter: 22–17, 20–11, 24–15, 17–13
	Pts: Williams 14; Rebs: Ciak, Gruda 5 Asts: Hériaud 6	Boxscore	Pts: Nacickaitė 20; Rebs: Paugaitė 8 Asts: Paugaitė 4	Arena: Palacium; Referees: Ventsislav Velikov (BUL), Valerio Grigioni (ITA), Sonia Teixeira (POR)

14 November 2021	Finland	71–77	Ukraine	Helsinki
17:00	Scoring by quarter: 13–23, 18–17, 22–19, 18–18
	Pts: Kuier 25; Rebs: Kuier 11; Asts: Lehtoranta 9	Boxscore	Pts: Iagupova 31; Rebs: Yurkevichus 8 Asts: Iagupova 7	Arena: Urhea-halli; Referees: Özge Şentürk (TUR), Nikola Bejat (NOR), Diana Lapanović (SLO)

24 November 2022	Lithuania	81–62	Ukraine	Vilnius
19:30	Scoring by quarter: 23–17, 14–25, 29–10, 15–10
	Pts: Petronytė 27; Rebs: Petronytė 12; Asts: Baltkojienė, Labuckienė 5	Boxscore	Pts: Iagupova 18; Rebs: Yurkevichus 10; Asts: Iagupova 7	Arena: Jeep Arena; Referees: Mihkel Männiste (EST), Paulina Gajdosz (POL), Vladimir Jevtović (SRB)

24 November 2022	France	103–77	Finland	Saint-Chamond
20:30	Scoring by quarter: 24–17, 23–14, 28–23, 28–23
	Pts: Johannès 16; Rebs: Chartereau, Chéry 7 Asts: Fauthoux 6	Boxscore	Pts: Aarnisalo 24; Rebs: Kuier 7 Asts: Aarnisalo 6	Arena: Arena Saint-Étienne Métropole; Referees: Ivana Ivanović (SRB), Suzana Vujičić (MNE), Sandra Sánchez (ESP)

27 November 2022	Finland	56–65	Lithuania	Helsinki
15:00	Scoring by quarter: 9–20, 12–14, 18–14, 17–17
	Pts: Kuier 19; Rebs: Kuier 9 Asts: Kuier 5	Boxscore	Pts: Nacickaitė 24; Rebs: Labuckienė 11; Asts: four players 3	Arena: Urhea-halli; Referees: Alexandra Stan (ROU), Kristīne Simanoviča (LAT), Sara Månsson (SWE)

27 November 2022	France	109–88	Ukraine	Roanne
17:00	Scoring by quarter: 32–20, 22–30, 32–26, 23–12
	Pts: Johannès 21; Rebs: Badiane, Chartereau 5 Asts: Fauthoux 7	Boxscore	Pts: Iagupova 28; Rebs: Maznichenko 10; Asts: Iagupova 6	Arena: Halle André Vacheresse; Referees: Viola Györgyi (NOR), Siniša Prpa (SRB), Özlem Yalman (TUR)

9 February 2023	Ukraine	74–59	Finland	Riga, Latvia (Note: Due to the Russian invasion of Ukraine, the Ukrainian team is required to play their home matches at neutral venues until further notice.)
19:00	Scoring by quarter: 15–16, 31–20, 21–10, 7–13
	Pts: Iagupova 22; Rebs: Yurkevichus 11; Asts: Yurkevichus 5	Boxscore	Pts: Aarnisalo 19; Rebs: Lemmila 8 Asts: Koskimies 4	Arena: Olympic Sports Centre; Referees: Andrada Csender (ROU), Anna Belousova (LAT), Mihkel Männiste (EST)

9 February 2023	Lithuania	75–83	France	Vilnius
	Scoring by quarter: 17–20, 23–20, 11–22, 24–21
	Pts: Nacickaitė 20; Rebs: Petronytė 10; Asts: Jocytė 6	Boxscore	Pts: Johannès 21; Rebs: Badiane 9 Asts: Johannès, Williams 4	Arena: Jeep Arena; Referees: Geert Jacobs (BEL), Blaž Zupančič (SLO), Łukasz Jankowski (POL)

12 February 2023	Finland	46–82	France	Helsinki
15:00	Scoring by quarter: 6–20, 20–17, 4–30, 16–15
	Pts: Aarnisalo 16; Rebs: Lemmila 7 Asts: three players 2	Boxscore	Pts: Williams 18; Rebs: Ciak 8 Asts: Michel 7	Arena: Urhea-halli; Referees: Beniamino Attard (ITA), Alberto Sánchez (ESP), Tijmen Last (NED)

12 February 2023	Ukraine	71–65	Lithuania	Riga, Latvia
16:00	Scoring by quarter: 21–12, 19–30, 23–8, 8–15
	Pts: Iagupova 21; Rebs: Iagupova 9 Asts: Iagupova 5	Boxscore	Pts: Petronytė 20; Rebs: Petronytė 14; Asts: three players 2	Arena: Olympic Sports Centre; Referees: Carsten Straube (GER), Ventsislav Velikov (BUL), Nikola Bejat (NOR)

=== Group C ===
Pos	Team	Pld	W	L	PF	PA	PD	Pts	Qualification
1	Spain	6	6	0	533	300	+233	12	Final tournament
2	Hungary	6	4	2	505	348	+157	10	Final tournament
3	Iceland	6	1	5	322	535	−213	7 (Note: Iceland 127–123 Romania)	
4	Romania	6	1	5	305	482	−177	7	

Source: FIBA
Rules for classification: 1) Points; 2) Head-to-head; 3) Points difference; 4) Points scored.
Notes:

11 November 2021	Hungary	62–66	Spain	Szekszárd
18:00	Scoring by quarter: 15–14, 13–19, 18–20, 16–13
	Pts: Határ 22; Rebs: Határ, Lelik 8 Asts: Horváth 6	Boxscore	Pts: Torrens 19; Rebs: Conde 13; Asts: Conde, Domínguez 5	Arena: Szekszárdi Sportközpont; Referees: Kerem Baki (TUR), Paulina Gajdosz (POL), Vladimir Jevtović (SRB)

11 November 2021	Romania	65–59	Iceland	Bucharest
	Scoring by quarter: 16–14, 10–11, 19–21, 20–13
	Pts: Orban 19; Rebs: Orban 18; Asts: Podar 6	Boxscore	Pts: Hinriksdóttir 17; Rebs: Hinriksdóttir 11; Asts: Hinriksdóttir 4	Arena: Dinamo Polyvalent Hall; Referees: Mila Cavara (BIH), Maria Ignatiou (CYP), Franko Gracin (CRO)

14 November 2021	Spain	107–52	Romania	Almería
18:00	Scoring by quarter: 24–19, 22–8, 24–7, 37–18
	Pts: Conde, Etxarri 21; Rebs: Conde 10; Asts: Conde 7	Boxscore	Pts: Stanici 16; Rebs: Orban 8 Asts: Stanici 4	Arena: Palacio Municipal Juegos Mediterráneos; Referees: Amel Dahra (FRA), Silvia Marziali (ITA), Alexandre Maret (FRA)

14 November 2021	Iceland	58–115	Hungary	Hafnarfjörður
20:00	Scoring by quarter: 20–28, 17–31, 13–25, 8–31
	Pts: Hinriksdóttir 15; Rebs: Hinriksdóttir 7 Asts: Hinriksdóttir, Jónsdóttir 6	Boxscore	Pts: Goree 27; Rebs: Lelik 10; Asts: Goree 11	Arena: Ithrottamidstod Asvellir; Referees: Andris Aunkrogers (LAT), Sinem Tetik (TUR), Goran Sljivic (AUT)

24 November 2022	Romania	40–99	Hungary	Timișoara
18:00	Scoring by quarter: 4–32, 10–24, 14–18, 12–25
	Pts: Armanu 9 Rebs: Virjoghe 8 Asts: Ardelean, Ghizila 3	Boxscore	Pts: Kiss 24; Rebs: Goree 12; Asts: Lelik, Studer 5	Arena: Constantin Jude Sports Hall; Referees: Martin Vulić (CRO), Veronika Vávrová (CZE), Ilias Kounelles (CYP)

24 November 2022	Spain	120–54	Iceland	Huelva
20:30	Scoring by quarter: 32–8, 27–8, 32–25, 29–13
	Pts: Araújo 19; Rebs: Araújo 10; Asts: Conde, Romero 6	Boxscore	Pts: Hinriksdóttir 16; Rebs: Kjartansdóttir 5 Asts: Hinriksdóttir 3	Arena: Palacio de los Deportes Carolina Marín; Referees: Marion Ortis (FRA), Arnoud van Bochove (NED), Joana Pessoa (POR)

27 November 2022	Iceland	68–58	Romania	Reykjavík
16:30	Scoring by quarter: 15–15, 12–17, 19–18, 22–8
	Pts: Hinriksdóttir 33; Rebs: three players 7 Asts: Jónsdóttir 7	Boxscore	Pts: Virjoghe 21; Rebs: Virjoghe 17; Asts: Ghizila, Podar 3	Arena: Laugardalshöll; Referees: Nikola Bejat (NOR), Anna Belousova (LAT), Milita Stalaučinskaitė (LTU)

27 November 2022	Spain	77–66	Hungary	Huelva
20:30	Scoring by quarter: 17–16, 26–13, 17–18, 17–19
	Pts: Ndour 21; Rebs: three players 6 Asts: Maite Cazorla, Torrens 6	Boxscore	Pts: Kiss 14; Rebs: Goree 8 Asts: Goree 5	Arena: Palacio de los Deportes Carolina Marín; Referees: Beniamino Attard (ITA), Franko Gracin (CRO), Anastasios Kardaris (GRE)

9 February 2023	Romania	32–75	Spain	Sfântu Gheorghe
18:00	Scoring by quarter: 13–18, 6–20, 8–19, 5–18
	Pts: Podar 13; Rebs: Stanici 7 Asts: Cătinean, Irimia 3	Boxscore	Pts: Salvadores 14; Rebs: three players 5 Asts: three players 3	Arena: Sepsi Arena; Referees: Vladimir Jevtović (SRB), Veronika Vávrová (CZE), Petar Pešić (SRB)

9 February 2023	Hungary	89–49	Iceland	Miskolc
18:00	Scoring by quarter: 22–16, 27–13, 15–12, 16–18
	Pts: Kiss 17; Rebs: Goree, Kiss 9 Asts: Kanyasi 7	Boxscore	Pts: Hinriksdóttir 19; Rebs: Sigurðardóttir 7 Asts: Jónsdóttir 6	Arena: DVTK Arena; Referees: Paulina Gajdosz (POL), Ivana Radinović (MNE), Veronika Obertová (SVK)

12 February 2023	Hungary	74–58	Romania	Miskolc
18:00	Scoring by quarter: 21–12, 16–22, 15–10, 22–14
	Pts: Goree 19; Rebs: Goree 14; Asts: Dubei 5	Boxscore	Pts: Șipoș 15; Rebs: Șipoș 6 Asts: Cătinean 6	Arena: DVTK Arena; Referees: Josip Jurčević (CRO), Franko Gracin (CRO), Ori Shalhavi (ISR)

12 February 2023	Iceland	34–88	Spain	Reykjavík
19:45	Scoring by quarter: 10–18, 10–28, 6–24, 8–18
	Pts: Lárusdóttir 14; Rebs: Grímsdóttir 7 Asts: Jónsdóttir 4	Boxscore	Pts: Ginzo 13; Rebs: Araújo 11; Asts: Canella 6	Arena: Laugardalshöll; Referees: Jelena Tomić (CRO), Indrė Balnionytė (LTU), Sara Månsson (SWE)

=== Group D ===
Pos	Team	Pld	W	L	PF	PA	PD	Pts	Qualification
1	Turkey	6	5	1	520	345	+175	11	Final tournament
2	Poland	6	4	2	514	329	+185	10	
3	Slovenia (Note: Slovenia qualified as the co–host nation of the FIBA Women's EuroBasket 2023.)	6	3	3	523	374	+149	9	Qualified as co-host
4	Albania	6	0	6	241	750	−509	6	

Source: FIBA
Rules for classification: 1) Points; 2) Head-to-head; 3) Points difference; 4) Points scored.
Notes:

11 November 2021	Slovenia	62–78	Turkey	Ljubljana
18:00	Scoring by quarter: 14–27, 6–19, 18–18, 24–14
	Pts: Oblak 21; Rebs: Seničar 7 Asts: Barič 7	Boxscore	Pts: Çakır 16; Rebs: Stokes 16; Asts: Aydın, Bilgiç 4	Arena: Kodeljevo Hall; Referees: Alexandre Deman (FRA), Mihkel Männiste (EST), Alin Faur (ROU)

11 November 2021	Poland	125–19	Albania	Gniezno
	Scoring by quarter: 38–9, 38–4, 29–2, 20–4
	Pts: Skobel 19; Rebs: Telenga 13; Asts: Sklepowicz 7	Boxscore	Pts: Qosja 6 Rebs: Lalaj, Lugaj 4 Asts: Lugaj 2	Arena: Gniezno Sports Hall; Referees: Margarita Petrenko (RUS), Kristīne Simanoviča (LAT), Indrė Balnionytė (LTU)

14 November 2021	Turkey	52–41	Poland	İzmit
17:00	Scoring by quarter: 12–8, 12–11, 16–6, 12–16
	Pts: Çağlar 12; Rebs: Stokes 13; Asts: Olcay Çakır 6	Boxscore	Pts: Gertchen 16; Rebs: Rembiszewska, Telenga 6 Asts: Makurat 4	Arena: Şehit Polis Recep Topaloğlu Sports Hall; Referees: Geert Jacobs (BEL), Jelena Tomić (CRO), Andrei Sharapa (BLR)

14 November 2021	Albania	28–127	Slovenia	Durrës
18:00	Scoring by quarter: 14–30, 0–23, 11–36, 3–29
	Pts: Lugaj 14; Rebs: Shallo 7 Asts: Baraj, Lalaj 3	Boxscore	Pts: Jelenc 24; Rebs: Jelenc, Seničar 12; Asts: Oblak 6	Arena: Dhimitraq Goga Sports Palace; Referees: Silvia Jury (AUT), Suzana Vujičić (MNE), Alexander Eger (AUT)

24 November 2022	Poland	71–78	Slovenia	Gniezno
17:30	Scoring by quarter: 14–26, 27–11, 13–17, 17–24
	Pts: Kastanek 11; Rebs: Telenga 15; Asts: Gajda 4	Boxscore	Pts: three players 14; Rebs: Lisec, Oblak 7 Asts: Oblak 13	Arena: Gniezno Sports Hall; Referees: Beniamino Attard (ITA), Andrada Csender (ROU), Gintaras Mačiulis (LTU)

24 November 2022	Turkey	140–44	Albania	Mersin
19:00	Scoring by quarter: 35–10, 39–6, 33–13, 33–15
	Pts: McCowan 28; Rebs: McCowan 17; Asts: Çakır 8	Boxscore	Pts: Lugaj 9 Rebs: Lalaj 9 Asts: Baraj 4	Arena: Servet Tazegül Arena; Referees: Dumitru Stasiev (MDA), Nataša Dragojević (MNE), Natalie Galuk (ISR)

27 November 2022	Albania	50–136	Poland	Durrës
17:00	Scoring by quarter: 6–43, 6–37, 20–24, 18–32
	Pts: Verri 11; Rebs: Qosja 5 Asts: Rreshpja, Verri 2	Boxscore	Pts: Banaszak 23; Rebs: Banaszak, Borkowska 11; Asts: Makurat 9	Arena: Dhimitraq Goga Sports Palace; Referees: Ivana Radinović (MNE), Ngadhnjim Shabani (KOS), Aikaterini Asimakaki (GRE)

27 November 2022	Turkey	80–74	Slovenia	Mersin
18:00	Scoring by quarter: 26–18, 17–19, 19–20, 18–17
	Pts: McCowan 26; Rebs: McCowan 9 Asts: Şenyürek 6	Boxscore	Pts: Friškovec 27; Rebs: three players 7 Asts: Oblak 14	Arena: Servet Tazegül Arena; Referees: Gintaras Mačiulis (LTU), Esperanza Mendoza (ESP), Gatis Saliņš (LAT)

9 February 2023	Slovenia	124–52	Albania	Ljubljana
18:00	Scoring by quarter: 30–19, 33–7, 27–9, 34–17
	Pts: Jelenc, Vujačić 17; Rebs: Jelenc 9 Asts: Čeh 9	Boxscore	Pts: Rreshpja 14; Rebs: Qosja 5 Asts: Baraj, Lalaj 3	Arena: Kodeljevo Hall; Referees: Ivana Ivanović (SRB), Claudia Ferrara (ITA), Martina Mekelová (SVK)

9 February 2023	Poland	76–72	Turkey	Sosnowiec
18:00	Scoring by quarter: 17–17, 20–17, 27–22, 12–16
	Pts: Skobel 17; Rebs: Telenga 9 Asts: Gajda 14	Boxscore	Pts: Şenyürek 20; Rebs: McCowan 16; Asts: Uzun 7	Arena: Hala Widowiskowo-Sportowa; Referees: Sergii Zashchuk (UKR), Ville Selkee (FIN), Suzana Vujičić (MNE)

12 February 2023	Albania	48–98	Turkey	Durrës
17:00	Scoring by quarter: 16–26, 12–28, 16–24, 4–20
	Pts: Qosja, Rreshpja 12; Rebs: three players 4 Asts: Lugaj, Rreshpja 2	Boxscore	Pts: McCowan 19; Rebs: Akalan 7 Asts: Bilgiç 6	Arena: Dhimitraq Goga Sports Palace; Referees: Milosav Kaluđerović (MNE), Tomi Panov (MKD), Xhelal Mumini (KOS)

12 February 2023	Slovenia	58–65	Poland	Ljubljana
18:00	Scoring by quarter: 13–8, 16–16, 15–22, 14–19
	Pts: Lisec 18; Rebs: Friškovec 8 Asts: Barič 6	Boxscore	Pts: Skobel 15; Rebs: Telenga 14; Asts: Gajda 5	Arena: Kodeljevo Hall; Referees: Péter Praksch (HUN), Sandra Sánchez (ESP), Andrea Bongiorni (ITA)

=== Group E ===
Pos	Team	Pld	W	L	PF	PA	PD	Pts	Qualification
1	Serbia	4	4	0	350	250	+100	8	Final tournament
2	Croatia	4	2	2	300	316	−16	6	
3	Bulgaria	4	0	4	274	358	−84	4	

Source: FIBA
Rules for classification: 1) Points; 2) Head-to-head; 3) Points difference; 4) Points scored.

11 November 2021	Bulgaria	73–84	Croatia	Botevgrad
19:00	Scoring by quarter: 27–22, 11–26, 21–22, 14–14
	Pts: Ivanova 19; Rebs: Zlatanova 7 Asts: Ivanova 6	Boxscore	Pts: Dojkić 24; Rebs: Begić 12; Asts: Dojkić 6	Arena: Arena Botevgrad; Referees: Gvidas Gedvilas (LTU), Özge Şentürk (TUR), Gatis Saliņš (LAT)

14 November 2021	Croatia	66–84	Serbia	Zabok
18:00	Scoring by quarter: 21–24, 14–31, 16–7, 15–22
	Pts: Begić 19; Rebs: Bura 8 Asts: Begić 4	Boxscore	Pts: Crvendakić 33; Rebs: Krajišnik 9 Asts: Anderson 9	Arena: Zabok Sport Hall; Referees: Özlem Yalman (TUR), Thomas Bissuel (FRA), Alexandre Deman (FRA)

24 November 2022	Serbia	79–51	Bulgaria	Belgrade
18:00	Scoring by quarter: 25–9, 31–7, 10–22, 13–13
	Pts: Krajišnik 18; Rebs: Krajišnik 13; Asts: Anderson 8	Boxscore	Pts: Hristova 14; Rebs: Dimitrova 9 Asts: Konstantinova 5	Arena: Ranko Žeravica Sports Hall; Referees: Marek Kúkelčík (SVK), Sinem Tetik (TUR), Eirini Tsantali (GRE)

27 November 2022	Croatia	93–74	Bulgaria	Vukovar
19:00	Scoring by quarter: 24–29, 27–13, 16–14, 26–18
	Pts: Begić 27; Rebs: Bura 11; Asts: Tadić 9	Boxscore	Pts: Hristova 20; Rebs: Hristova 9 Asts: Hristova 6	Arena: Borovo Sports Hall; Referees: Valentin Oliot (FRA), Andrada Csender (ROU), Can Mavisu (TUR)

9 February 2023	Serbia	85–57	Croatia	Belgrade
18:00	Scoring by quarter: 29–17, 20–15, 18–16, 18–9
	Pts: Nogić 21; Rebs: Nogić 10; Asts: Jovanović 5	Boxscore	Pts: Zellous 27; Rebs: Begić 9 Asts: Slonjšak 3	Arena: Ranko Žeravica Sports Hall; Referees: Mehmet Sahin (TUR), Anastasios Kardaris (GRE), Viktor Nagy (HUN)

12 February 2023	Bulgaria	76–102	Serbia	Samokov
18:00	Scoring by quarter: 22–22, 17–22, 24–30, 13–28
	Pts: Hristova 20; Rebs: three players 4 Asts: Hristova 5	Boxscore	Pts: Anderson 29; Rebs: Crvendakić, Krajišnik 7 Asts: Anderson 10	Arena: Arena Samokov; Referees: Özlem Yalman (TUR), Kerem Baki (TUR), Amalia Marchis (ROU)

=== Group F ===
Pos	Team	Pld	W	L	PF	PA	PD	Pts	Qualification
1	Montenegro	4	3	1	283	252	+31	7	Final tournament
2	Denmark	4	2	2	289	262	+27	6	
3	Austria	4	1	3	222	280	−58	5	
4	~~Russia~~ (Note: Russia was excluded due to the 2022 Russian invasion of Ukraine.)	0	0	0	0	0	0	0	Excluded

Source: FIBA
Rules for classification: 1) Points; 2) Head-to-head; 3) Points difference; 4) Points scored.
Notes:

11 November 2021	Denmark	82–48	Austria	Gentofte
18:30	Scoring by quarter: 16–15, 24–12, 21–13, 21–8
	Pts: Seilund 22; Rebs: Hesseldal 14; Asts: Jespersen 7	Boxscore	Pts: Koizar 8 Rebs: Koizar 5 Asts: Koizar 3	Arena: Gentofte Sportspark; Referees: Sonia Teixeira (POR), Karolina Andersson (FIN), Diana Lapanović (SLO)

11 November 2021	Montenegro	64 ~~–85~~	Russia	Podgorica
18:30	Scoring by quarter: 8–22, 22–20, 18–26, 16–17
	Pts: Gatling 18; Rebs: Pašić 6 Asts: Mujović 3	Boxscore	Pts: Vadeeva 19; Rebs: Musina 10; Asts: Goldyreva 7	Arena: Bemax Arena; Referees: Martin Horozov (BUL), Łukasz Jankowski (POL), Anastasios Kardaris (GRE)

14 November 2021	Austria	60–70	Montenegro	Schwechat
18:00	Scoring by quarter: 14–19, 15–17, 18–17, 13–17
	Pts: Köppl 16; Rebs: Fuchs-Robetin 6 Asts: Koizar 4	Boxscore	Pts: Gatling 22; Rebs: Gatling 12; Asts: Leković, Mujović 4	Arena: Multiversum; Referees: Zdenko Tomašovič (SVK), Veronika Vávrová (CZE), Nir Meirson (ISR)

14 November 2021	Russia	~~77–57~~	Denmark	Moscow
18:00	Scoring by quarter: 25–16, 17–13, 22–12, 13–16
	Pts: Repnikova, Shilova 12; Rebs: Maiga 9 Asts: Glonti 3	Boxscore	Pts: Jespersen 19; Rebs: Hesseldal 8 Asts: Seilund 4	Arena: Alexander Gomelsky Universal Sports Hall CSKA; Referees: Mihkel Männiste (EST), Lizaveta Famina (BLR), Dumitru Stasiev (MDA)

24 November 2022	Russia	Cancelled	Austria

24 November 2022	Denmark	60–67	Montenegro	Gentofte
18:30	Scoring by quarter: 14–18, 15–16, 7–16, 24–17
	Pts: Jespersen 30; Rebs: Hesseldal 13; Asts: Hesseldal 5	Boxscore	Pts: Dubljević 23; Rebs: Dubljević 11; Asts: Mujović 3	Arena: Gentofte Sportspark; Referees: Zdenko Tomašovič (SVK), Esperanza Mendoza (ESP), Mária Mekelová (SVK)

27 November 2022	Austria	66–63	Denmark	Vienna
18:05	Scoring by quarter: 18–18, 18–20, 14–19, 16–6
	Pts: Koizar 18; Rebs: Schicher 9 Asts: Fuchs-Robetin, Schicher 4	Boxscore	Pts: Jespersen 21; Rebs: Hesseldal 11; Asts: Seilund 9	Arena: Hallmann-Dome; Referees: Jelena Tomić (CRO), Carsten Straube (GER), Jakub Izák (SVK)

27 November 2022	Russia	Cancelled	Montenegro

9 February 2023	Montenegro	65–48	Austria	Podgorica
18:00	Scoring by quarter: 15–10, 15–11, 19–15, 16–12
	Pts: Dubljević 16; Rebs: Živković 11; Asts: Dubljević 4	Boxscore	Pts: Fuchs-Robetin, Sagerer 14; Rebs: Schicher 7 Asts: Koizar 5	Arena: Bemax Arena; Referees: Hrvoje Čavar (BIH), Gilbert Hoxha (ALB), Çisil Güngör (TUR)

9 February 2023	Denmark	Cancelled	Russia

12 February 2023	Austria	Cancelled	Russia

12 February 2023	Montenegro	81–84(OT)	Denmark	Podgorica
20:00	Scoring by quarter: 19–20, 16–13, 20–21, 16–17, Overtime: 10–13
	Pts: Leković 18; Rebs: Živković 8 Asts: three players 4	Boxscore	Pts: Seilund 31; Rebs: Jespersen 11; Asts: three players 3	Arena: Bemax Arena; Referees: Özge Şentürk (TUR), Sinem Tetik (TUR), Zoran Mitrovski (MKD)

=== Group G ===
Pos	Team	Pld	W	L	PF	PA	PD	Pts	Qualification
1	Greece	6	5	1	422	380	+42	11	Final tournament
2	Great Britain	6	3	3	454	379	+75	9 (Note: Great Britain 2–0 Portugal)	Final tournament
3	Portugal	6	3	3	378	373	+5	9	
4	Estonia	6	1	5	338	460	−122	7	

Source: FIBA
Rules for classification: 1) Points; 2) Head-to-head; 3) Points difference; 4) Points scored.
Notes:

11 November 2021	Portugal	62–43	Estonia	Matosinhos
18:30	Scoring by quarter: 15–14, 17–11, 23–4, 7–14
	Pts: Bettencourt 17; Rebs: Kostourkova 11; Asts: Bettencourt 4	Boxscore	Pts: Lass 13; Rebs: Lass 10; Asts: Bratka 2	Arena: Centro de Desportos e Congressos de Matosinhos; Referees: Zdenko Tomašovič (SVK), Alberto Sánchez (ESP), Alexandre Maret (FRA)

11 November 2021	Great Britain	66–73	Greece	Manchester
19:30	Scoring by quarter: 15–20, 18–14, 12–20, 21–19
	Pts: Samuelson 14; Rebs: Stewart 11; Asts: Vanderwal 4	Boxscore	Pts: Nikolopoulou, Spanou 17; Rebs: Fasoula 9 Asts: Fasoula 5	Arena: National Basketball Performance Centre; Referees: Martin Vulić (CRO), Jelena Tomić (CRO), Blaž Zupančič (SLO)

14 November 2021	Estonia	72–69	Great Britain	Tallinn
18:00	Scoring by quarter: 19–19, 16–22, 16–10, 21–18
	Pts: Teder 15; Rebs: Teder 7 Asts: Sepp, Teder 5	Boxscore	Pts: Stewart 17; Rebs: Stewart 12; Asts: Handy 4	Arena: TalTech Sports Hall; Referees: Viola Györgyi (NOR), Péter Praksch (HUN), Gatis Saliņš (LAT)

14 November 2021	Greece	64–57	Portugal	Xanthi
18:00	Scoring by quarter: 20–11, 15–8, 12–20, 17–18
	Pts: Fasoula 18; Rebs: Fasoula 12; Asts: Nikolopoulou 4	Boxscore	Pts: Da Costa 15; Rebs: S. Silva 10; Asts: Bettencourt, Da Costa 3	Arena: Philippos Amoridis Arena; Referees: Petr Hrůša (CZE), Sergei Beliakov (RUS), Alexandra Stan (ROU)

24 November 2022	Greece	86–61	Estonia	Faliraki
18:00	Scoring by quarter: 27–15, 17–15, 22–20, 20–11
	Pts: Spanou 19; Rebs: Fasoula, Spanou 9 Asts: Pavlopoulou 9	Boxscore	Pts: Toks 11; Rebs: Pokk 11; Asts: Lass, Rattasepp 4	Arena: Kallithea Palais des Sports; Referees: Kerem Baki (TUR), Siniša Prpa (SRB), Alexandra Stan (ROU)

24 November 2022	Portugal	69–76(OT)	Great Britain	Matosinhos
20:30	Scoring by quarter: 12–16, 19–13, 12–14, 17–17, Overtime: 9–16
	Pts: Da Costa 33; Rebs: Kostourkova, S. Silva 6 Asts: S. Silva 4	Boxscore	Pts: Fagbenle 28; Rebs: Anigwe 10; Asts: Fagbenle, Leonard 5	Arena: Centro de Desportos e Congressos de Matosinhos; Referees: Geert Jacobs (BEL), Ariadna Chueca (ESP), Lynn Weiwers (LUX)

27 November 2022	Estonia	52–76	Portugal	Tartu
18:00	Scoring by quarter: 12–27, 16–21, 6–8, 18–20
	Pts: Lass, Pulk 12; Rebs: Koster 8 Asts: Koster 4	Boxscore	Pts: Bettencourt 15; Rebs: Kostourkova 9 Asts: Soeiro 6	Arena: University of Tartu Sports Hall; Referees: Paulina Gajdosz (POL), Veronika Vávrová (CZE), Sinem Tetik (TUR)

27 November 2022	Greece	72–65	Great Britain	Faliraki
18:00	Scoring by quarter: 18–12, 13–26, 18–12, 23–15
	Pts: Fasoula 22; Rebs: Spanou 12; Asts: Stamati 5	Boxscore	Pts: Fagbenle 18; Rebs: Anigwe 9 Asts: Leonard 8	Arena: Kallithea Palais des Sports; Referees: Vladimir Jevtović (SRB), Amalia Marchis (ROU), Nir Meirson (ISR)

9 February 2023	Great Britain	100–45	Estonia	Manchester
19:30	Scoring by quarter: 23–10, 25–7, 24–20, 28–8
	Pts: Fagbenle 23; Rebs: Fagbenle 7 Asts: Leonard 8	Boxscore	Pts: Koster 11; Rebs: Koster 12; Asts: Pokk 4	Arena: National Basketball Performance Centre; Referees: Dariusz Zapolski (POL), Emma Perry (IRL), Valentin Oliot (FRA)

9 February 2023	Portugal	66–60	Greece	Odivelas
20:30	Scoring by quarter: 13–9, 17–13, 16–18, 20–20
	Pts: Bettencourt 32; Rebs: S. Silva 9 Asts: Bettencourt 4	Boxscore	Pts: Fasoula 27; Rebs: Fasoula 12; Asts: Pavlopoulou 7	Arena: Pavilhão Multiusos de Odivelas; Referees: Viola Györgyi (NOR), Esperanza Mendoza (ESP), Gellért Kapitány (HUN)

12 February 2023	Great Britain	78–48	Portugal	Manchester
16:00	Scoring by quarter: 10–13, 25–10, 23–10, 20–15
	Pts: Fagbenle 17; Rebs: Fagbenle 9 Asts: Winterburn 11	Boxscore	Pts: S. Silva 19; Rebs: Kostourkova 6 Asts: three players 3	Arena: National Basketball Performance Centre; Referees: Martin Vulić (CRO), Gvidas Gedvilas (LTU), Laure Coanus (FRA)

12 February 2023	Estonia	65–67	Greece	Tallinn
18:00	Scoring by quarter: 16–18, 18–14, 19–15, 12–20
	Pts: Bratka 18; Rebs: Koster 11; Asts: Koster 6	Boxscore	Pts: Stamati 17; Rebs: Spanou 10; Asts: Spanou, Stamolamprou 4	Arena: Unibet Arena; Referees: Petr Hrůša (CZE), Sergii Zashchuk (UKR), Ville Selkee (FIN)

=== Group H ===
Pos	Team	Pld	W	L	PF	PA	PD	Pts	Qualification
1	Italy	6	6	0	498	317	+181	12	Final tournament
2	Slovakia	6	4	2	460	366	+94	10	Final tournament
3	Luxembourg	6	1	5	350	483	−133	7 (Note: Luxembourg 135–101 Switzerland)	
4	Switzerland	6	1	5	293	435	−142	7	

Source: FIBA
Rules for classification: 1) Points; 2) Head-to-head; 3) Points difference; 4) Points scored.
Notes:

11 November 2021	Slovakia	66–69	Italy	Piešťany
18:00	Scoring by quarter: 26–23, 7–10, 23–10, 10–26
	Pts: Bálintová 16; Rebs: Jakubcová 10; Asts: Dudášová 6	Boxscore	Pts: Romeo 19; Rebs: Keys 7 Asts: Zandalasini 8	Arena: Diplomat Arena; Referees: Gintaras Mačiulis (LTU), Elena Chernova (RUS), Ivana Ivanović (SRB)

11 November 2021	Luxembourg	54–58	Switzerland	Luxembourg City
19:00	Scoring by quarter: 17–12, 14–7, 12–23, 11–16
	Pts: Meynadier 14; Rebs: Skrijelj 10; Asts: Mossong, Skrijelj 4	Boxscore	Pts: Herminjard 29; Rebs: Herminjard 11; Asts: Fora 5	Arena: d'Coque; Referees: Marion Ortis (FRA), Veronika Vávrová (CZE), Ewa Matuszewska (POL)

14 November 2021	Switzerland	50–65	Slovakia	Fribourg
17:00	Scoring by quarter: 14–16, 12–12, 11–18, 13–19
	Pts: Herminjard 29; Rebs: Stoianov 13; Asts: Herminjard, Stoianov 3	Boxscore	Pts: Jakubcová 16; Rebs: Hruščáková, Oroszová 10; Asts: Bálintová 7	Arena: Site Sportif Saint Leonard; Referees: Cecília Tóth (HUN), Mila Cavara (BIH), Jelena Smiljanić (SRB)

14 November 2021	Italy	82–48	Luxembourg	Faenza
18:00	Scoring by quarter: 23–14, 17–12, 18–15, 24–7
	Pts: Madera 16; Rebs: Keys 11; Asts: Zandalasini 7	Boxscore	Pts: Meynadier 15; Rebs: Skrijelj 6 Asts: Skrijelj 4	Arena: PalaCattani; Referees: Ariadna Chueca (ESP), Duhan Köyiçi (TUR), Paulina Gajdosz (POL)

24 November 2022	Luxembourg	57–77	Slovakia	Luxembourg City
19:00	Scoring by quarter: 19–10, 11–26, 14–28, 13–13
	Pts: Etute 27; Rebs: Etute 15; Asts: Geniets, Skrijelj 4	Boxscore	Pts: Wrzesiński 17; Rebs: Jakubcová, Oroszová 10; Asts: Wrzesiński 6	Arena: d'Coque; Referees: Valentin Oliot (FRA), Laure Coanus (FRA), José Pedroso (POR)

24 November 2022	Italy	78–29	Switzerland	Naples
20:30	Scoring by quarter: 25–10, 26–12, 19–4, 8–3
	Pts: Zandalasini 17; Rebs: Andre 10; Asts: Bestagno, Zandalasini 5	Boxscore	Pts: Favre 7 Rebs: Favre 4 Asts: three players 2	Arena: PalaBarbuto; Referees: Özlem Yalman (TUR), Çisil Güngör (TUR), Anastasia Tsakiraki (GRE)

27 November 2022	Switzerland	43–81	Luxembourg	Fribourg
17:00	Scoring by quarter: 11–22, 12–16, 10–15, 10–28
	Pts: Constantin 16; Rebs: Schwarz 8 Asts: Fora, Jacquot 4	Boxscore	Pts: Mreches 24; Rebs: Etute 12; Asts: Jablonowski 5	Arena: Site Sportif Saint Leonard; Referees: Suzana Vujičić (MNE), Daniella Török (HUN), Sandra Sánchez (ESP)

27 November 2022	Italy	81–60	Slovakia	Naples
20:00	Scoring by quarter: 19–9, 23–15, 24–18, 15–18
	Pts: Verona 16; Rebs: Verona 8 Asts: Romeo, Zandalasini 6	Boxscore	Pts: Páleníková 16; Rebs: Jakubcová 8 Asts: Wrzesiński 9	Arena: PalaBarbuto; Referees: Blaž Zupančič (SLO), Josip Jurčević (CRO), Diana Lapanović (SLO)

9 February 2023	Slovakia	78–50	Switzerland	Piešťany
18:00	Scoring by quarter: 15–18, 23–13, 23–9, 17–10
	Pts: Mištinová 17; Rebs: Mištinová 11; Asts: Stašová 5	Boxscore	Pts: Herminjard 14; Rebs: Favre 6 Asts: Favre 4	Arena: Diplomat Arena; Referees: Karolina Andersson (FIN), Can Mavisu (TUR), Bartłomiej Kucharski (POL)

9 February 2023	Luxembourg	51–109	Italy	Luxembourg City
19:00	Scoring by quarter: 13–24, 12–25, 18–25, 8–35
	Pts: Geniets 16; Rebs: three players 7 Asts: three players 2	Boxscore	Pts: Romeo 21; Rebs: Andre 8 Asts: Fassina, Zandalasini 6	Arena: d'Coque; Referees: Alexandre Maret (FRA), Pierre Gilis (BEL), David Caballe (IRL)

12 February 2023	Switzerland	63–79	Italy	Fribourg
17:00	Scoring by quarter: 21–19, 12–17, 18–20, 12–23
	Pts: Fora 14; Rebs: Favre 10; Asts: Herminjard 9	Boxscore	Pts: Andre 16; Rebs: Zandalasini 7 Asts: Zandalasini 9	Arena: Site Sportif Saint Leonard; Referees: Marion Ortis (FRA), Kate Unsworth (GBR), Joana Pessoa (POR)

12 February 2023	Slovakia	114–59	Luxembourg	Piešťany
18:00	Scoring by quarter: 28–19, 30–11, 35–17, 21–12
		Boxscore		Arena: Diplomat Arena; Referees: Cecília Tóth (HUN), Milita Stalaučinskaitė (LTU), Mateusz Skorek (POL)

=== Group I ===
Pos	Team	Pld	W	L	PF	PA	PD	Pts	Qualification
1	Czech Republic	4	4	0	284	226	+58	8	Final tournament
2	Netherlands	4	2	2	256	256	0	6	
3	Ireland	4	0	4	227	285	−58	4	
4	Belarus (Note: Belarus was excluded due to their country's involvement during the 2022 Russian invasion of Ukraine.)	0	0	0	0	0	0	0	Excluded

Source: FIBA
Rules for classification: 1) Points; 2) Head-to-head; 3) Points difference; 4) Points scored.
Notes:

11 November 2021	Netherlands	82–60	Ireland	Amsterdam
18:30	Scoring by quarter: 31–10, 15–15, 15–20, 21–15
	Pts: Treffers 18; Rebs: Hof 12; Asts: Westerik 4	Boxscore	Pts: Melia 16; Rebs: Finn 7 Asts: Thornton 5	Arena: Sporthallen Zuid; Referees: Amel Dahra (FRA), Danjana Rey (GER), Ivana Radinović (MNE)

11 November 2021	Czech Republic	60~~–66~~	Belarus	Prague
18:45	Scoring by quarter: 19–15, 12–15, 16–19, 13–17
	Pts: Březinová 14; Rebs: Voráčková 14; Asts: Vyoralová 4	Boxscore	Pts: Papova 25; Rebs: Bentley, Verameyenka 12; Asts: Bentley 7	Arena: Královka Arena; Referees: Viola Györgyi (NOR), Sinem Tetik (TUR), Siniša Prpa (SRB)

14 November 2021	Belarus	83~~–72~~(OT)	Netherlands	Minsk
15:00	Scoring by quarter: 16–21, 18–15, 13–14, 20–17, Overtime: 16–5
	Pts: Verameyenka 23; Rebs: Verameyenka 13; Asts: Tarasava 9	Boxscore	Pts: Hof 16; Rebs: Hof 13; Asts: Cornelius 5	Arena: Minsk Sports Palace; Referees: Tanel Suslov (EST), Andrada Csender (ROU), Ivana Ivanović (SRB)

14 November 2021	Ireland	54–70	Czech Republic	Dublin
17:00	Scoring by quarter: 10–23, 11–14, 17–17, 16–16
	Pts: Tiernan 12; Rebs: Melia 9 Asts: Melia 4	Boxscore	Pts: Reisingerová 12; Rebs: three players 5 Asts: Záplatová 5	Arena: National Basketball Arena; Referees: Kate Unsworth (GBR), Nemanja Ninković (SRB), Davíð Tómasson (ISL)

24 November 2022	Netherlands	66–71	Czech Republic	Almere
19:00	Scoring by quarter: 15–24, 13–19, 23–16, 15–12
	Pts: Fokke, Westerik 11; Rebs: Bettonvil 7 Asts: Bettonvil 4	Boxscore	Pts: Reisingerová 19; Rebs: Reisingerová 7 Asts: Voráčková 8	Arena: Topsportcentrum; Referees: Jelena Tomić (CRO), Mehmet Karabilecen (TUR), Franko Gracin (CRO)

24 November 2022	Belarus	Cancelled	Ireland
		Boxscore

27 November 2022	Ireland	56–59	Netherlands	Dublin
17:15	Scoring by quarter: 21–9, 13–5, 12–28, 10–17
	Pts: Melia 19; Rebs: Claire Melia; Asts: Finn, Herlihy 4	Boxscore	Pts: Bettonvil 15; Rebs: Bettonvil, Treffers 9 Asts: three players 3	Arena: National Basketball Arena; Referees: Marion Ortis (FRA), Kate Unsworth (GBR), Laure Coanus (FRA)

27 November 2022	Belarus	Cancelled	Czech Republic

9 February 2023	Czech Republic	74–57	Ireland	Prague
17:00	Scoring by quarter: 26–14, 17–13, 15–12, 16–18
	Pts: Stoupalová, Voráčková 16; Rebs: four players 7 Asts: Voráčková 6	Boxscore	Pts: Thornton 16; Rebs: Herlihy 10; Asts: Thornton 4	Arena: Královka Arena; Referees: Goran Sljivic (AUT), Marina Shalamberidze (GEO), Aleksandar Radonjić (BIH)

9 February 2023	Netherlands	Cancelled	Belarus

12 February 2023	Ireland	Cancelled	Belarus

12 February 2023	Czech Republic	69–49	Netherlands	Prague
18:00	Scoring by quarter: 10–12, 21–7, 23–11, 15–19
	Pts: Březinová 19; Rebs: Eliška Hamzová, Voráčková 6 Asts: Voráčková 4	Boxscore	Pts: Vennema 9 Rebs: Van den Adel 7 Asts: Van den Adel 4	Arena: Královka Arena; Referees: Alexandra Stan (ROU), Ewa Matuszewska (POL), Armin Mutapčić (GER)

=== Group J ===
Pos	Team	Pld	W	L	PF	PA	PD	Pts	Qualification
1	Latvia	4	4	0	301	264	+37	8	Final tournament
2	Israel (Note: Israel qualified as the co–host nation of the FIBA Women's EuroBasket 2023.)	4	2	2	275	266	+9	6	Qualified as co-host
3	Sweden	4	0	4	260	306	−46	4	

Source: FIBA
Rules for classification: 1) Points; 2) Head-to-head; 3) Points difference; 4) Points scored.
Notes:

11 November 2021	Israel	56–62	Latvia	Tel Aviv
18:00	Scoring by quarter: 20–6, 12–24, 12–20, 12–12
	Pts: Garzon 16; Rebs: Fleischer 7 Asts: Eisner 7	Boxscore	Pts: Šteinberga 24; Rebs: Šteinberga 11; Asts: Dikaioulaku 5	Arena: Drive in Arena; Referees: Jelena Smiljanić (SRB), Péter Praksch (HUN), Alexandra Stan (ROU)

14 November 2021	Latvia	89–70	Sweden	Riga
17:00	Scoring by quarter: 22–21, 25–18, 23–21, 19–10
	Pts: Šteinberga 34; Rebs: Šteinberga 13; Asts: Babkina 12	Boxscore	Pts: Gustavsson 14; Rebs: Lundquist, Nyström 5 Asts: Lundquist 10	Arena: Olympic Sports Centre; Referees: Gintaras Vitkauskas (LTU), Ali Şakacı (TUR), Gintaras Mačiulis (LTU)

24 November 2022	Sweden	68–75	Israel	Uppsala
19:05	Scoring by quarter: 14–14, 16–13, 15–28, 23–20
	Pts: Lundquist 21; Rebs: Abdi 6 Asts: Lundquist 8	Boxscore	Pts: Baron 19; Rebs: Cohen 9 Asts: Karsh 4	Arena: Fyrishov; Referees: Gvidas Gedvilas (LTU), Viola Györgyi (NOR), Péter Praksch (HUN)

27 November 2022	Latvia	79–73	Israel	Riga
15:00	Scoring by quarter: 19–21, 15–16, 24–24, 21–12
	Pts: Laksa 23; Rebs: Šteinberga 10; Asts: Šteinberga 7	Boxscore	Pts: Rotberg 28; Rebs: Cohen 8 Asts: Karsh 5	Arena: Olympic Sports Centre; Referees: Amel Dahra (FRA), Karolina Andersson (FIN), Veronika Vávrová (CZE)

9 February 2023	Israel	71–57	Sweden	Rishon LeZion
18:00	Scoring by quarter: 19–10, 12–22, 23–8, 17–17
	Pts: Baron 29; Rebs: Simms 16; Asts: Simms 8	Boxscore	Pts: Zahui 13; Rebs: Zahui 10; Asts: E. Eldebrink, F. Eldebrink 5	Arena: Maccabi House Arena; Referees: Özlem Yalman (TUR), Jelena Smiljanić (SRB), Maria Ignatiou (CYP)

12 February 2023	Sweden	65–71	Latvia	Stockholm
16:35	Scoring by quarter: 19–16, 18–9, 13–20, 15–26
	Pts: Zahui 18; Rebs: Zahui 7 Asts: E. Eldebrink 8	Boxscore	Pts: Šteinberga 37; Rebs: Šteinberga 9 Asts: Jākobsone 5	Arena: Avicii Arena; Referees: Marek Kúkelčík (SVK), Juozas Barkauskas (LTU), Davíð Tómasson (ISL)

=== Ranking of second-placed teams ===
The best four second-placed teams from the qualifying groups (except groups F and I) qualified for the final tournament. If one, or both, of the hosts are in qualifying spots, the next best-ranked second placed teams would qualify. Matches against the fourth-placed team in each group were not included in this ranking.

Pos	Grp	Team	Pld	W	L	PF	PA	PD	Pts	Qualification
1	C	Hungary	4	2	2	332	250	+82	6	Final tournament
2	H	Slovakia	4	2	2	317	266	+51	6	Final tournament
3	G	Great Britain	4	2	2	285	262	+23	6	Final tournament
4	A	Germany	4	2	2	288	272	+16	6	Final tournament
5	D	Poland	4	2	2	253	260	−7	6	
6	B	Ukraine	4	2	2	311	326	−15	6	
7	E	Croatia	4	2	2	300	316	−16	6	

Source: FIBA
Rules for classification: 1) Points; 2) Points difference; 3) Points scored.

== Qualified teams ==
Country	Qualified as	Date of qualification	Last appearance	Best placement in tournament	WR
Slovenia	Host nation	11 June 2021	2021	Tenth place (2019, 2021)	19
Israel	Host nation	11 June 2021	2011	Eighth place (1991)	54
Latvia	Group J winner	27 November 2022	2019	Fourth place (2007)	24
Spain	Group C winner	27 November 2022	2021	Champions (1993, 2013, 2017, 2019)	4
Italy	Group H winner	27 November 2022	2021	Champions (1938)	16
Belgium	Group A winner	9 February 2023	2021	Third place (2017, 2021)	7
France	Group B winner	9 February 2023	2021	Champions (2001, 2009)	6
Montenegro	Group F winner	9 February 2023	2021	Sixth place (2011)	20
Serbia	Group E winner	9 February 2023	2021	Champions (2015, 2021)	8
Turkey	Group D winner	9 February 2023	2021	Runners-up (2011)	11
Greece	Group G winner	9 February 2023	2021	Fourth place (2017)	17
Hungary	One of four best second-ranked teams	12 February 2023	2019	Runners-up (1950, 1956)	27
Great Britain	One of four best second-ranked teams	12 February 2023	2019	Fourth place (2019)	21
Czech Republic	Group I winner	12 February 2023	2021	Champions (2005)	22
Slovakia	One of four best second-ranked teams	12 February 2023	2021	Runners-up (1997)	23
Germany	One of four best second-ranked teams	12 February 2023	2011	Third place (1966, 1997)	37
