= EuroBasket Women 2017 Group B =

Group B of the EuroBasket Women 2017 took place between 16 and 19 June 2017. The group played all of its games at Hradec Králové, Czech Republic.

== Standings ==
Pos	Team	Pld	W	L	PF	PA	PD	Pts	Qualification
1	Turkey	3	3	0	211	185	+26	6	Quarterfinals
2	Italy	3	2	1	201	175	+26	5	Qualification for quarterfinals
3	Slovakia	3	1	2	187	196	−9	4	Qualification for quarterfinals
4	Belarus	3	0	3	193	236	−43	3	

Source: FIBA
Rules for classification: 1) Points; 2) Head-to-head results; 3) Points difference; 4) Points scored.

All times are local (UTC+2).

== Matches ==
=== Belarus vs Italy ===
16 June 2017
12:30

Boxscore

Belarus	60–80	Italy
Scoring by quarter: 16–18, 12–20, 12–26, 20–16
Pts: Bentley 17; Rebs: Kress 7 Asts: Bentley, Kress 4		Pts: Sottana 20; Rebs: Zandalasini 8 Asts: Gorini 4

Zimní stadion Hradec Králové, Hradec Králové
Referees: Boris Krejić (SLO), Ilias Kounelles (CYP), Maripier Malo (CAN)

=== Turkey vs Slovakia ===
16 June 2017
15:00

Boxscore

Turkey	69–58	Slovakia
Scoring by quarter: 26–18, 19–15, 11–12, 13–13
Pts: Hollingsworth 14; Rebs: Çağlar 8 Asts: Alben 6		Pts: Bálintová 17; Rebs: three players 6 Asts: Bálintová 9

Zimní stadion Hradec Králové, Hradec Králové
Attendance: 856
Referees: Zdravko Rutešić (MNE), Sergei Beliakov (RUS), Jelena Smiljanić (SRB)

=== Slovakia vs Belarus ===
17 June 2017
12:30

Boxscore

Slovakia	68–59	Belarus
Scoring by quarter: 15–16, 17–17, 19–11, 17–15
Pts: Žirková 22; Rebs: Růžičková 15; Asts: Žirková 5		Pts: Snytsina 12; Rebs: Kress 7 Asts: Likhtarovich 5

Zimní stadion Hradec Králové, Hradec Králové
Attendance: 621
Referees: Vasiliki Tsaroucha (GRE), Vincent Delestrée (BEL), Ilias Kounelles (CYP)

=== Italy vs Turkey ===
17 June 2017
20:30

Boxscore

Italy	53–54	Turkey
Scoring by quarter: 17–12, 13–18, 12–15, 11–9
Pts: Zandalasini 23; Rebs: Zandalasini 10; Asts: Dotto 5		Pts: Hollingsworth 29; Rebs: Hollingsworth 21; Asts: Alben, Vardarlı 4

Zimní stadion Hradec Králové, Hradec Králové
Attendance: 894
Referees: Yohan Rosso (FRA), Mārtiņš Kozlovskis (LAT), Tanel Suslov (EST)

=== Belarus vs Turkey ===
19 June 2017
15:00

Boxscore

Belarus	74–88	Turkey
Scoring by quarter: 14–20, 23–27, 11–19, 26–22
Pts: Bentley 15; Rebs: Bentley 7 Asts: Bentley 5		Pts: Çakır 15; Rebs: Hollingsworth 7 Asts: Çakır 6

Zimní stadion Hradec Králové, Hradec Králové
Attendance: 692
Referees: Sergei Beliakov (RUS), Saulius Racys (SWE), Jelena Tomić (CRO)

=== Slovakia vs Italy ===
19 June 2017
20:30

Boxscore

Slovakia	61–68	Italy
Scoring by quarter: 12–16, 18–17, 13–22, 18–13
Pts: Bálintová 13; Rebs: Oroszová 8 Asts: Bálintová 5		Pts: Sottana, Zandalasini 15; Rebs: Zandalasini 12; Asts: Dotto 6

Zimní stadion Hradec Králové, Hradec Králové
Attendance: 1,975
Referees: Jasmina Juras (SRB), Vincent Delestrée (BEL), Boris Krejić (SLO)
