= EuroBasket Women 2017 Group A =

Group A of the EuroBasket Women 2017 took place between 16 and 19 June 2017. The group played all of its games at Hradec Králové, Czech Republic.

== Standings ==
Pos	Team	Pld	W	L	PF	PA	PD	Pts	Qualification
1	Spain	3	2	1	201	169	+32	5 (Note: Spain 76–54 Ukraine)	Quarterfinals
2	Ukraine	3	2	1	197	195	+2	5	Qualification for quarterfinals
3	Hungary	3	1	2	194	216	−22	4 (Note: Czech Republic 70–74 Hungary)	Qualification for quarterfinals
4	Czech Republic (H)	3	1	2	184	196	−12	4	

Source: FIBA
Rules for classification: 1) Points; 2) Head-to-head results; 3) Points difference; 4) Points scored.
(H) Hosts
Notes:

All times are local (UTC+2).

== Matches ==
=== Ukraine vs Czech Republic ===
16 June 2017
18:00

Boxscore

Ukraine	59–47	Czech Republic
Scoring by quarter: 24–13, 18–10, 4–10, 13–14
Pts: Iagupova 21; Rebs: Udodenko 16; Asts: Iagupova 4		Pts: Vaughn 16; Rebs: Vaughn 6 Asts: Elhotová 4

Zimní stadion Hradec Králové, Hradec Králové
Attendance: 3,197
Referees: Jasmina Juras (SRB), Yohan Rosso (FRA), Jelena Tomić (CRO)

=== Hungary vs Spain ===
16 June 2017
20:30

Boxscore

Hungary	48–62	Spain
Scoring by quarter: 8–18, 13–12, 10–13, 17–19
Pts: Krivačević, Vandersloot 11; Rebs: Határ 8 Asts: Fegyverneky 4		Pts: Lyttle 17; Rebs: Lyttle 12; Asts: Cruz 4

Zimní stadion Hradec Králové, Hradec Králové
Attendance: 2,876
Referees: Tanel Suslov (EST), Mārtiņš Kozlovskis (LAT), Vasiliki Tsaroucha (GRE)

=== Spain vs Ukraine ===
17 June 2017
15:00

Boxscore

Spain	76–54	Ukraine
Scoring by quarter: 13–15, 22–19, 20–9, 21–11
Pts: Torrens 26; Rebs: Lyttle 18; Asts: Torrens 5		Pts: Iagupova 23; Rebs: Iagupova 8 Asts: Iagupova 4

Zimní stadion Hradec Králové, Hradec Králové
Attendance: 966
Referees: Jasmina Juras (SRB), Boris Krejić (SLO), Maripier Malo (CAN)

=== Czech Republic vs Hungary ===
17 June 2017
18:00

Boxscore

Czech Republic	70–74	Hungary
Scoring by quarter: 20–24, 18–14, 12–17, 20–19
Pts: Hanušová 17; Rebs: Hanušová 8 Asts: Vyoralová 5		Pts: Bujdosó 21; Rebs: Fegyverneky, Krivačević 7 Asts: Vandersloot 7

Zimní stadion Hradec Králové, Hradec Králové
Attendance: 3,120
Referees: Zdravko Rutešić (MNE), Sergei Beliakov (RUS), Saulius Racys (SWE)

=== Hungary vs Ukraine ===
19 June 2017
12:30

Boxscore

Hungary	72–84	Ukraine
Scoring by quarter: 18–26, 12–21, 17–20, 25–17
Pts: Zele 13; Rebs: Bujdosó 7 Asts: Medgyessy 4		Pts: Udodenko 22; Rebs: Moss 10; Asts: Iagupova 7

Zimní stadion Hradec Králové, Hradec Králové
Attendance: 858
Referees: Yohan Rosso (FRA), Mārtiņš Kozlovskis (LAT), Vasiliki Tsaroucha (GRE)

=== Czech Republic vs Spain ===
19 June 2017
18:00

Boxscore

Czech Republic	67–63	Spain
Scoring by quarter: 17–17, 11–12, 17–15, 22–19
Pts: Vaughn 18; Rebs: three players 6 Asts: Elhotová, Vyoralová 6		Pts: Lyttle 17; Rebs: Nicholls 9 Asts: Palau, Torrens 5

Zimní stadion Hradec Králové, Hradec Králové
Attendance: 3,137
Referees: Maripier Malo (CAN), Zdravko Rutešić (MNE), Jelena Smiljanić (SRB)
