= EuroBasket Women 2017 Group C =

Group C of the EuroBasket Women 2017 took place between 16 and 19 June 2017. The group played all of its games at Prague, Czech Republic.

== Standings ==
Pos	Team	Pld	W	L	PF	PA	PD	Pts	Qualification
1	France	3	3	0	213	188	+25	6	Quarterfinals
2	Serbia	3	1	2	205	211	−6	4 (Note: Serbia 3 Pts, +10 PD; Greece 3 Pts, +6 PD; Slovenia 3 Pts, −16 PD)	Qualification for quarterfinals
3	Greece	3	1	2	188	189	−1	4	Qualification for quarterfinals
4	Slovenia	3	1	2	196	214	−18	4	

Source: FIBA
Rules for classification: 1) Points; 2) Head-to-head results; 3) Points difference; 4) Points scored.
Notes:

All times are local (UTC+2).

== Matches ==
=== Serbia vs Greece ===
16 June 2017
18:00

Boxscore

Serbia	60–69	Greece
Scoring by quarter: 11–19, 19–16, 21–18, 9–16
Pts: Milovanović 17; Rebs: Milovanović 8 Asts: Radočaj 3		Pts: Spanou 18; Rebs: Maltsi 9 Asts: Maltsi 5

Kralovka Arena, Prague
Attendance: 1,200
Referees: Janusz Calik (POL), Marek Kúkelčík (SVK), Ventsislav Velikov (BUL)

=== Slovenia vs France ===
16 June 2017
20:30

Boxscore

Slovenia	68–70	France
Scoring by quarter: 9–18, 24–16, 15–14, 20–22
Pts: Barič 18; Rebs: Lisec 9 Asts: Lisec, Oblak 3		Pts: Ciak 16; Rebs: Dumerc, Époupa 6 Asts: Dumerc 6

Kralovka Arena, Prague
Attendance: 765
Referees: Luis Castillo (ESP), Ilona Kučerová (CZE), Paulo Marques (POR)

=== Greece vs Slovenia ===
17 June 2017
18:00

Boxscore

Greece	56–59	Slovenia
Scoring by quarter: 14–12, 19–11, 14–21, 9–15
Pts: Kaltsidou 23; Rebs: Kaltsidou 7 Asts: Maltsi 6		Pts: Lisec; Rebs: Piršič 10; Asts: Oblak 6

Kralovka Arena, Prague
Attendance: 800
Referees: Fabiana Martinescu-Badalan (ROU), Mykola Ambrosov (UKR), Michele Rossi (ITA)

=== France vs Serbia ===
17 June 2017
20:30

Boxscore

France	73–57	Serbia
Scoring by quarter: 15–19, 18–15, 19–9, 21–14
Pts: Dumerc, Miyem 17; Rebs: Minte 10; Asts: Dumerc 5		Pts: Milovanović, Petrović 18; Rebs: Petrović 7 Asts: Radočaj 4

Kralovka Arena, Prague
Attendance: 1,100
Referees: Maj Forsberg (DEN), Andrei Sharapa (BLR), Özlem Yalman (TUR)

=== Serbia vs Slovenia ===
19 June 2017
15:00

Boxscore

Serbia	88–69	Slovenia
Scoring by quarter: 21–30, 23–11, 18–17, 26–11
Pts: Petrović 23; Rebs: Škorić 6 Asts: Petrović 6		Pts: Oblak 22; Rebs: Evans, Lisec 5 Asts: Barič 6

Kralovka Arena, Prague
Attendance: 760
Referees: Michele Rossi (ITA), Janusz Calik (POL), Ventsislav Velikov (BUL)

=== France vs Greece ===
19 June 2017
20:30

Boxscore

France	70–63	Greece
Scoring by quarter: 14–19, 21–11, 14–22, 21–11
Pts: Miyem, Skrela 12; Rebs: Tchatchouang 7 Asts: Dumerc 5		Pts: Maltsi 25; Rebs: Nikolopoulou 7 Asts: Nikolopoulou 7

Kralovka Arena, Prague
Attendance: 600
Referees: Maj Forsberg (DEN), Mykola Ambrosov (UKR), Ilona Kučerová (CZE)
