= EuroBasket Women 2017 Group D =

Group D of the EuroBasket Women 2017 took place between 16 and 19 June 2017. The group played all of its games at Prague, Czech Republic.

== Standings ==
Pos	Team	Pld	W	L	PF	PA	PD	Pts	Qualification
1	Belgium	3	3	0	204	197	+7	6	Quarterfinals
2	Russia	3	2	1	224	189	+35	5	Qualification for quarterfinals
3	Latvia	3	1	2	193	188	+5	4	Qualification for quarterfinals
4	Montenegro	3	0	3	173	220	−47	3	

Source: FIBA
Rules for classification: 1) Points; 2) Head-to-head results; 3) Points difference; 4) Points scored.

All times are local (UTC+2).

== Matches ==
=== Belgium vs Montenegro ===
16 June 2017
12:30

Boxscore

Belgium	66–64	Montenegro
Scoring by quarter: 25–13, 15–18, 12–15, 14–18
Pts: K. Mestdagh 19; Rebs: Meesseman 7 Asts: Vanloo 5		Pts: Robinson 19; Rebs: Robinson 17; Asts: Jovanović, Škerović 4

Kralovka Arena, Prague
Attendance: 700
Referees: Fabiana Martinescu-Badalan (ROU), Michele Rosso (ITA), Andrei Sharapa (BLR)

=== Latvia vs Russia ===
16 June 2017
15:00

Boxscore

Latvia	59–71	Russia
Scoring by quarter: 17–12, 7–22, 19–19, 16–18
Pts: Babkina 20; Rebs: Šteinberga 12; Asts: Babkina 5		Pts: Prince 19; Rebs: Vadeeva 12; Asts: Prince, Vadeeva 4

Kralovka Arena, Prague
Attendance: 750
Referees: Maj Forsberg (DEN), Gellért Kapitány (HUN), Özlem Yalman (TUR)

=== Montenegro vs Latvia ===
17 June 2017
12:30

Boxscore

Montenegro	55–76	Latvia
Scoring by quarter: 23–15, 14–23, 12–14, 6–24
Pts: Robinson 14; Rebs: Robinson 16; Asts: Škerović 10		Pts: Babkina 27; Rebs: Šteinberga 10; Asts: Babkina 7

Kralovka Arena, Prague
Attendance: 680
Referees: Janusz Calik (POL), Paulo Marques (POR), Ventsislav Velikov (BUL)

=== Russia vs Belgium ===
17 June 2017
15:00

Boxscore

Russia	75–76 (OT)	Belgium
Scoring by quarter: 15–29, 17–17, 17–15, 19–7, Overtime: 7–8
Pts: Prince 17; Rebs: Vadeeva 14; Asts: Prince 5		Pts: Meesseman 23; Rebs: Wauters 9 Asts: K. Mestdagh 5

Kralovka Arena, Prague
Attendance: 1,000
Referees: Luis Castillo (ESP), Andrada Csender (ROU), Marek Kúkelčík (SVK)

=== Latvia vs Belgium ===
19 June 2017
12:30

Boxscore

Latvia	58–62	Belgium
Scoring by quarter: 10–16, 23–19, 18–9, 7–18
Pts: Šteinberga 14; Rebs: Šteinberga 20; Asts: Baško, Vītola 3		Pts: Wauters 17; Rebs: Meesseman 9 Asts: Carpréaux, Vanloo 4

Kralovka Arena, Prague
Attendance: 800
Referees: Fabiana Martinescu-Badalan (ROU), Andrei Sharapa (BLR), Özlem Yalman (TUR)

=== Montenegro vs Russia ===
19 June 2017
18:00

Boxscore

Montenegro	54–78	Russia
Scoring by quarter: 18–21, 16–17, 15–19, 5–21
Pts: Robinson 17; Rebs: Robinson 8 Asts: Škerović 5		Pts: Prince 13; Rebs: Tikhonenko 12; Asts: Prince 6

Kralovka Arena, Prague
Attendance: 700
Referees: Luis Castillo (ESP), Andrada Csender (ROU), Gellért Kapitány (HUN)
