= Nóra Nagy-Bujdosó =

Hungarian basketball player

No. 55 – VBW CEKK Ceglèd
- Position: Small forward
- League: NB I/A

Personal information
- Born: November 18, 1985 (age 40) Budapest, Hungary
- Listed height: 6 ft 0 in (1.83 m)

Nóra Nagy-Bujdosó (born November 18, 1985) is a Hungarian basketball player for VBW CEKK Ceglèd and the Hungarian national team.

She participated at the EuroBasket Women 2017.
