= Zhosselina Maiga =

Russian basketball player

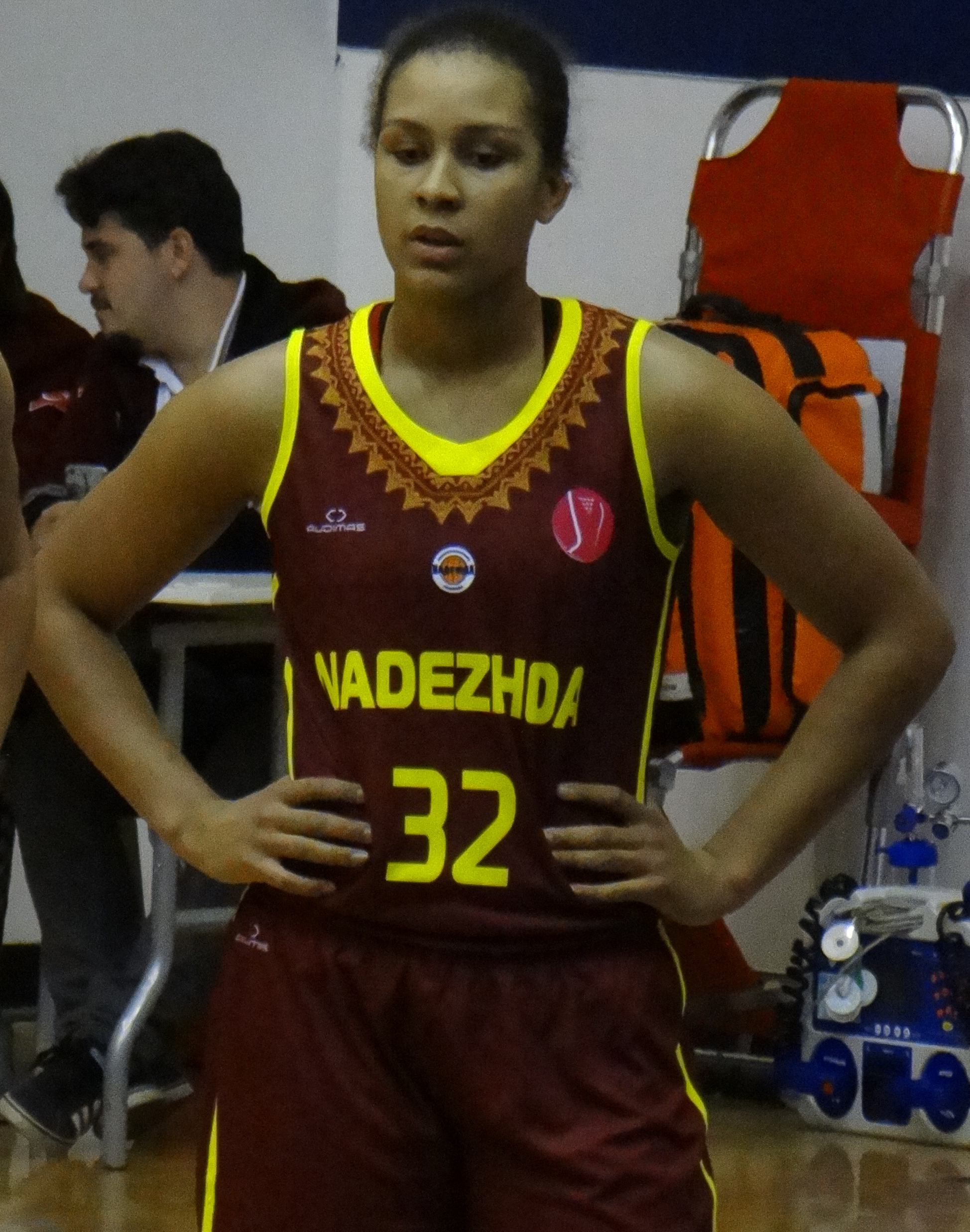
- Maiga in 2017

No. 32 – Nadezhda Orenburg
- Position: Power forward
- League: RPL

Personal information
- Born: April 30, 1996 (age 30) Rostov-on-Don, Russia
- Listed height: 6 ft 4 in (1.93 m)

Zhosselina Aliyevna Maiga (Russian: Жосселина Алиевна Майга; born April 30, 1996) is a Russian basketball player for Nadezhda Orenburg and the Russian national team.

She participated at the EuroBasket Women 2017.

== Personal life ==
Her father is Malian and her mother is Russian.
