= Nicole Romeo =

Australian-Italian basketball player

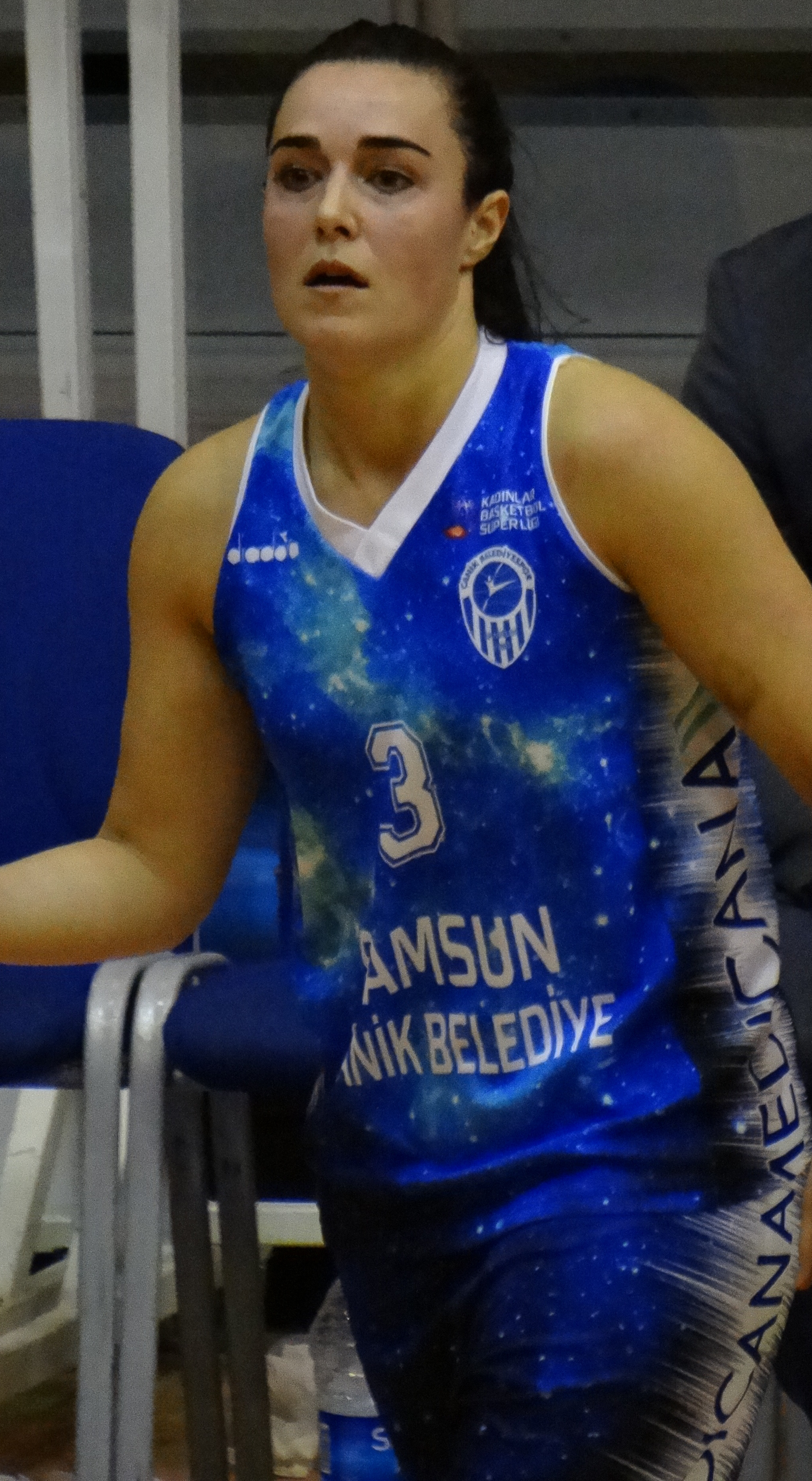

Personal information
- Born: 29 August 1989 (age 37) Adelaide, South Australia

Career information
- High school: Saint Ignatius' (Adelaide, South Australia)
- College: Washington (2008–2009)
- WNBA draft: 2011: undrafted
- Playing career: 2009–present
- Position: Guard

Career history
- 2009–2011: Canberra Capitals
- 2011–2013: Townsville Fire
- 2013–2014: Melbourne Boomers
- 2014–2015: TSV 1880 Wasserburg
- 2015–2016: AE Sedis Bàsquet
- 2016–2017: Campus Promete
- 2017–2018: Uni Girona CB
- 2018–2019: Canik Belediyespor
- 2019-2023: Ragusa

Career highlights
- WNBL Champion (2010); DBBL Champion (2015); QBL Most Valuable Player (2011)
Medals
Basketball
Representing Italy

Nicole Elaine Romeo (born 29 August 1989) is an Australian-Italian basketball player.

== College ==
Romeo played one season of college basketball at the University of Washington in Seattle, Washington for the Huskies.

== Career ==
=== Australia ===
In 2009, Romeo was a member of the Sandringham Sabres team in the SEABL. In 2010 and 2011, Romeo was a member of the Rockhampton Cyclones in the Queensland Basketball League. In 2011, she was the league's season MVP. In 2013, Romeo was a member of the Frankston Blues team in the SEABL. Romeo would return to the SEABL for the 2015, 2016 & 2017 seasons with Nunawading, Warrandyte & Sandringham respectively.

=== WNBL ===
Romeo first played in the WNBL for the Canberra Capitals in 2009. She played for the team during their 2009/2010 and 2010/2011 seasons. In her first season, she had an average of 1.08 points per game and .9 rebounds per game. During her second season with the Capitals, she played in every single regular season game. Her per game statistics improved to 5.2 points per game. That season, she also averaged 2.0 assists per game. During an October 2010 game, she scored 19 points in a game against the Australian Institute of Sport. This was the most points she had scored in a game during her first two seasons in the league. In the opening game of the 2010/2011 season against the Bulleen Boomers, she scored seven points while only playing 15 minutes. In an October 2010 game against Townsville, she scored 12 points and was third overall in scoring for the Capitals in that game. In a November 2010 game against the Bendigo Spirit, she and Nicole Hunt were in charge of and were successful in largely shutting down Kristi Harrower. In a December 2010 game against the Adelaide Lightning, she scored 12 points. During the 2010/2011 season, she would sometimes play point guard and the Canberra Times described her as being a threat on the perimeter.

Romeo joined the Townsville Fire for the 2011–12 season. Her teammates included Ellie Manou and Mia Newley. She arrived in Townsville in early September in order to get ready for pre-season training with the team, where she was expected to be the backup point guard. Romeo remained with the Fire for another year throughout the 2012–13 season. Romeo signed with the newly re-branded, Melbourne Boomers for the 2013–14 season. Playing alongside the likes of Rebecca Allen, Tess Madgen & Rachel Jarry.

=== Europe ===
Since departing the Australian League, Romeo has played across Europe in Germany, Spain, Turkey and Italy.

== National team ==
=== Senior Level ===
After growing up in Australia, Romeo pledged her allegiance to Italy after obtaining citizenship. Romeo made her debut with the Italian national team in November 2018 during the EuroBasket qualifiers.

== Personal life ==
Romeo was born on 29 August 1989. She is 166 centimetres (65 in) tall. Romeo plays at the guard position. Romeo played her junior basketball with the Norwood Flames Basketball Club in South Australia. Romeo has both Australian & Italian passports.
