= Maddalena Gorini =

Italian basketball player

No. 5 – Hatay BB
- Position: Shooting guard
- League: Turkish Super League; EuroCup Women

Personal information
- Born: 8 January 1992 (age 34) Rome, Italy
- Listed height: 5 ft 11 in (1.80 m)

Career history
- 2009–2014: PF Umbertide
- 2014–2018: Virtus Eirene Ragusa
- 2018–2020: Reyer Venezia
- 2020–2021: Magnolia Campobasso
- 2021–present: Hatayspor

Maddalena Gaia Gorini (born 8 January 1992) is an Italian basketball player for Hatayspor and the Italian national team.

She participated at the EuroBasket Women 2017.
