= Marie Růžičková =

Slovak basketball player

No. 14 – Reyer Venezia
- Position: Center
- League: LegA

Personal information
- Born: 18 November 1986 (age 39) Trenčín, Czechoslovakia
- Listed height: 6 ft 4 in (1.93 m)

Marie Růžičková (born 18 November 1986) is a Slovak basketball player for Reyer Venezia and the Slovak national team.

Růžičková participated at the EuroBasket Women 2017.
