= Barbora Wrzesiński =

Slovak basketball player

No. 11 – Arka Gdynia
- Position: Point guard
- League: Polish Women's Basketball League

Personal information
- Born: 15 December 1994 (age 30) Košice, Slovakia
- Listed height: 5 ft 10 in (1.78 m)

Career history
- 2011–2012: DANNAX Šport Košice
- 2012–2018: Good Angels Košice
- 2021–2023: USK Praha
- 2018–2021 2023–: Arka Gdynia

Barbora Wrzesiński (née Bálintová; born 15 December 1994) is a Slovak basketball player for Arka Gdynia. She was named Female Slovak Basketball Player of the Year four times in a row from 2018 to 2021.

== Biography ==
Wrzesiński was born in Košice on 15 December 1994. She started playing basketball at the age of five. She studied finance at the Technical University of Košice, graduating in 2016. In July 2022 she married Arka Gdynia physio Norbert Wrzesiński.

== Basketball career ==
Wrzesiński started her career with the team DANNAX Šport Košice in 2010. After the club dissolution in 2016, she joined the other Košice club Good Angels Košice, where she remained until 2018. While Wrzesiński was at Good Angles, the team dominated the Slovak league, winning the championship every session. In 2018, she joined Arka Gdynia, initially with a one-year contract, that was extended to three years.

In 2021 she missed many games due to harsh complications from COVID-19 infection. At the end of the session, she joined USK Praha In March 2023, she announced her return to Arka Gdynia.

=== National Team ===
Wrzesiński has been playing with the Slovak Women's National team since 2014, having played with the junior team in the previous year. She was fourth best player at the EuroBasket Women 2017. From 2020 to 2024 she was the captain on the Slovak national team. In October 2024, Wrzesiński announced the end of her national team career.
