= Sabína Oroszová =

Slovak basketball player (born 1993)

Sabina Oroszová
No. 10 – Piešťanské Čajky
- Position: Power forward
- League: SBE

Personal information
- Born: 5 June 1993 (age 33) Bratislava, Slovakia
- Listed height: 6 ft 4 in (1.93 m)

Sabína Šimonovičová (née Oroszová, born 5 June 1993) is a Slovak basketball player for Piešťanské Čajky and the Slovak national team.

She participated at the EuroBasket Women 2017.
