= Eva Lisec =

Slovenian basketball player

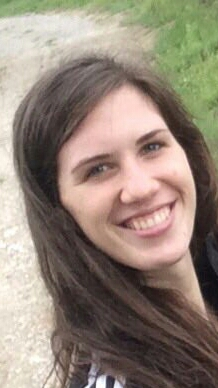
- Eva Lisec

No. 12 – Dynamo Kursk
- Position: Center/Power Forward
- League: Russian Premier League

Personal information
- Born: June 17, 1995 (age 31) Celje, Slovenia
- Listed height: 6 ft 4 in (1.93 m)

Career information
- Playing career: 2010–present

Career history
- 2010–2012: Grosuplje
- 2012–2015: Athlete Celje
- 2015–2020: PF Schio
- 2016–2017: → Atomerőmű SE (loan)
- 2020–present: Dynamo Kursk

Eva Lisec (born June 17, 1995) is a Slovenian female basketball player and a member of the Slovene women national basketball team. She started to play basketball in ŽKK Grosuplje when she was 15. From ŽKK Grosuplje she moved to the best Slovene basketball club at the moment ŽKK Cinkarna Celje. In the season 2015/2016 she moved from Celje to the Italian and Euroleague powerhouse Famila Schio. After playing basketball for only five years, at the age of 20, she stepped on the big court- she finished her debut in Euroleague with 10 points (she shot 5/5 from the field) and 2 rebounds in only 13 minutes on the court. In the season 2016/2017 she was loaned from Schio to KSC Szekszard to the Hungarian league, where she displayed excellent games and helped the club to reach the finals where they eventually lost to the higher ranked euroleague team Uniqa Sopron. In the only finals-series game KSC Szekszard won, Eva Contributed massive 27 points. In the season 2017/2018 she returned to Italy to play Euroleague with Famila Schio.
