= Taisiia Udodenko =

Ukrainian basketball player

No. 7 – Basketball Nymburk
- Position: Power forward
- League: ŽBL

Personal information
- Born: May 7, 1989 (age 37) Kharkiv, Soviet Union
- Listed height: 6 ft 3 in (1.91 m)

Taisiia Udodenko (born May 7, 1989) is a Ukrainian basketball player for Basketball Nymburk and the Ukrainian national team.

She participated at the EuroBasket Women 2017.
