= Marjorie Carpréaux =

Belgian basketball player

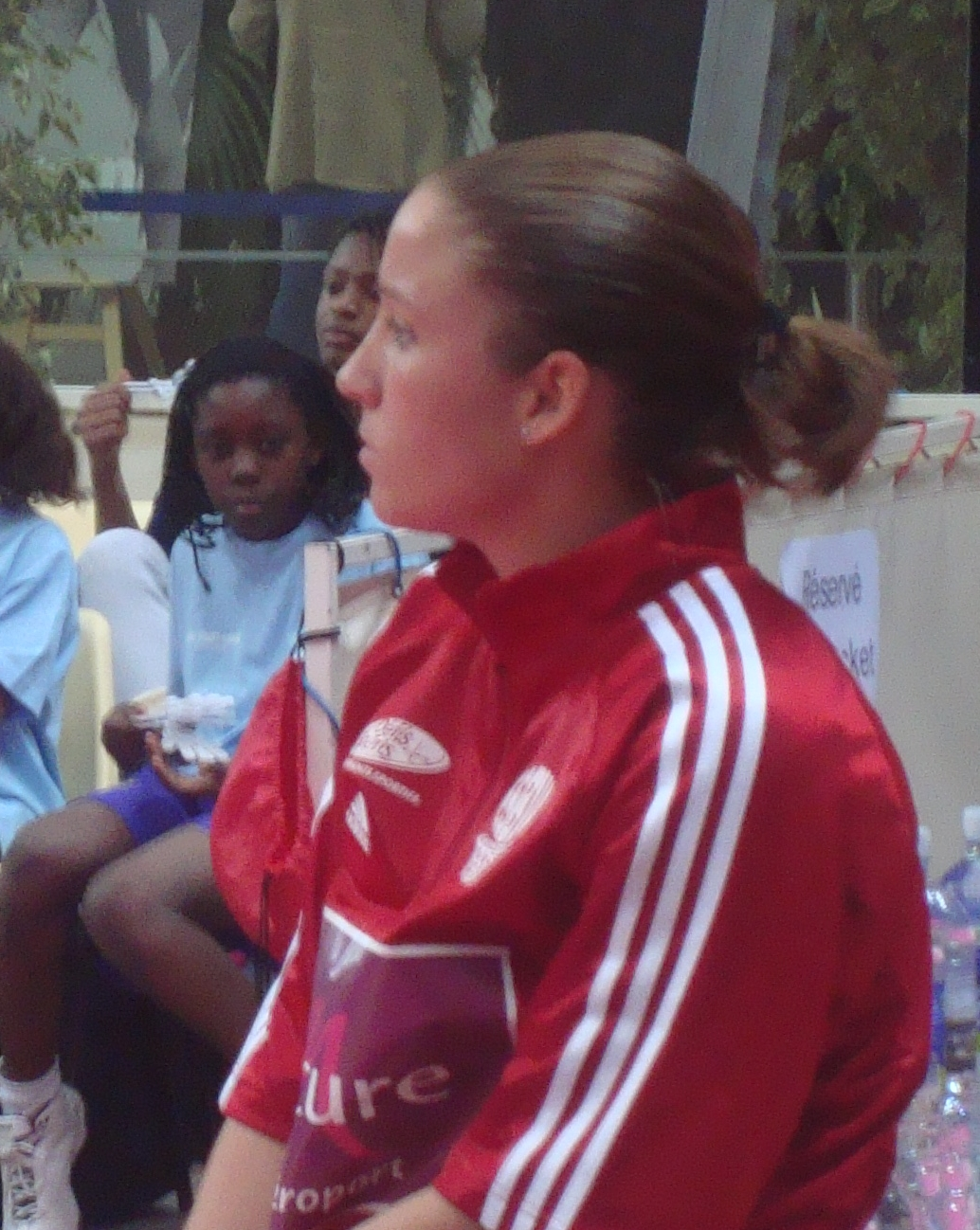
- Carpreaux with ESB Villeneuve-d'Ascq in 2010

No. 9 – Declercq Stortbeton Waregem
- Position: Point guard
- League: BBL

Personal information
- Born: 17 September 1987 (age 39) Boussu, Belgium
- Listed height: 5 ft 3 in (1.60 m)
- Listed weight: 128 lb (58 kg)

Career information
- WNBA draft: 2009: undrafted

Career history
- 2005–09: Dexia Namur
- 2009–10: Livourne
- 2010: USO Mondeville
- 2010: USO Mondeville
- 2010–11: Villeneuve-d'Ascq
- 2011–12: CJM Bourges
- 2012–15: Castors Braine
- 2016–17: Waregem
- 2017–18: Castors Braine
- 2018–20: Kangoeroes Mechelen
- 2020–21: Castors Braine
- 2021–23: Dexia Namur Capital
- 2023–24: Nyon Basket
- 2025: Athenas Lummen
- 2025: Kevlavik
- 2025–: Castors Braine

Career highlights
- 6x Belgian National League champion (2006, 2007, 2014, 2015, 2016, 2018); 4x Belgian Cup winner (2005, 2007, 2013, 2015)

Marjorie Carpréaux (born 17 September 1987) is a Belgian basketball player for Castors Braine and the Belgian national team.

She participated at the EuroBasket Women 2017 and 2021, with the team winning bronze each time.. In 2021, after a record of 157 caps, she decided to say goodbye to the Belgian Cats.

She is openly lesbian.

== Honours and awards ==
=== Team ===
(Belgium) BC Mamur Capitale

- Belgian League: 2005–06, 2006–07
- Belgian Cup: 2005–06, 2006–07

(Belgium) Castors Braine

- Belgian League: 2013–14, 2014–15, 2015–16, 2017–18
- Belgian Cup: 2013–14, 2014–15

(Belgium) National Team

- European Championship: (bronze) 2017, 2021
- Belgian Sports Team of the Year: 2020

=== Individual ===
- Belgian Player of the Year: 2013–14
