= Tijana Krivačević =

Serbian-born Hungarian basketball player

Tijana Krivaćević
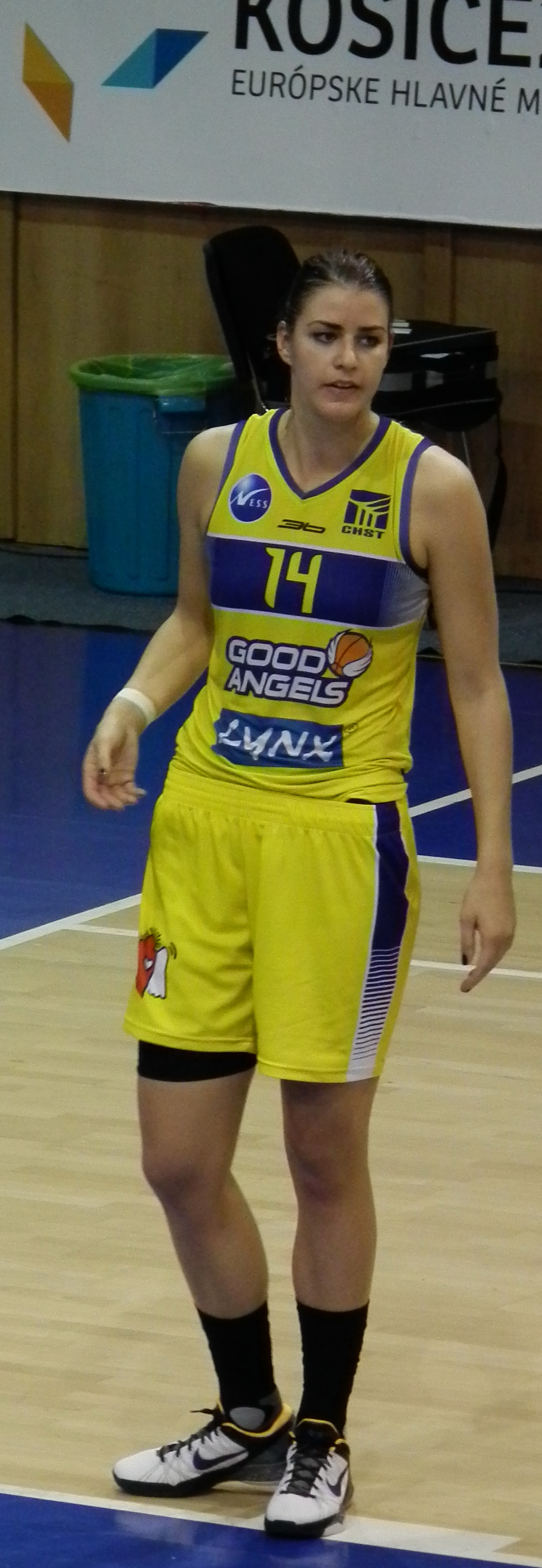
- Tijana Krivaćević in 2013

No. 14 – Girne Üniversitesi
- Position: Power forward
- League: TKBL

Personal information
- Born: 8 April 1990 (age 36) Novi Sad, Serbia
- Listed height: 6 ft 5 in (1.96 m)
- Listed weight: 172 lb (78 kg)

Career information
- WNBA draft: 2010: 3rd round, 34th overall pick
- Drafted by: Seattle Storm
- Playing career: 2005–present

Career history
- 2005–2006: Ceglédi EKK
- 2006–2008: Mizo Pécs 2010
- 2008–2011: MKB Euroleasing Sopron
- 2011–2012: Rivas Ecópolis
- 2012–2015: Good Angels Košice
- 2015: UNIQA Sopron
- 2015–2016: Orduspor
- 2016–2017: Perfumerías Avenida
- 2017: Girne Üniversitesi
- 2017-2018: UNI Győr
- 2018-2019: Botaş SK
- 2019-2020: Elitzur Ramla
- 2021-2022: Broni
- 2022-2023: Valdarno
- 2023-2024: Besiktas
- 2024-present: Sopron Basket
- Stats at Basketball Reference

Tijana Krivaćević (Hungarian: Krivacsevics Tijana) (born 8 April 1990) is a Serbian-born Hungarian professional female basketball player. She plays as center / forward. She is the daughter of the former Serbian basketball player Dragoljub Krivaćević, who works as a coach in Hungary. Just on her 20th birthday, Tijana was picked by Seattle Storm on the 2010 WNBA draft in the third round, 34th overall.

Tijana participated in University games for the first time in 2013 in the city of Kazan as part of the national team of Hungary where took the 7th place. She played six matches and scored 129 points, the best total for the team. Her best match was against the Czech Republic, where she scored 34 points in a single game. She was among the top 10 leading scorers of the tournament.

== See also ==
- List of Serbian WNBA players
