= Královka Arena =

Sports venue in Letná, Czechia

Královka sports hall
- Sportovní hala Královka
- Královka Arena
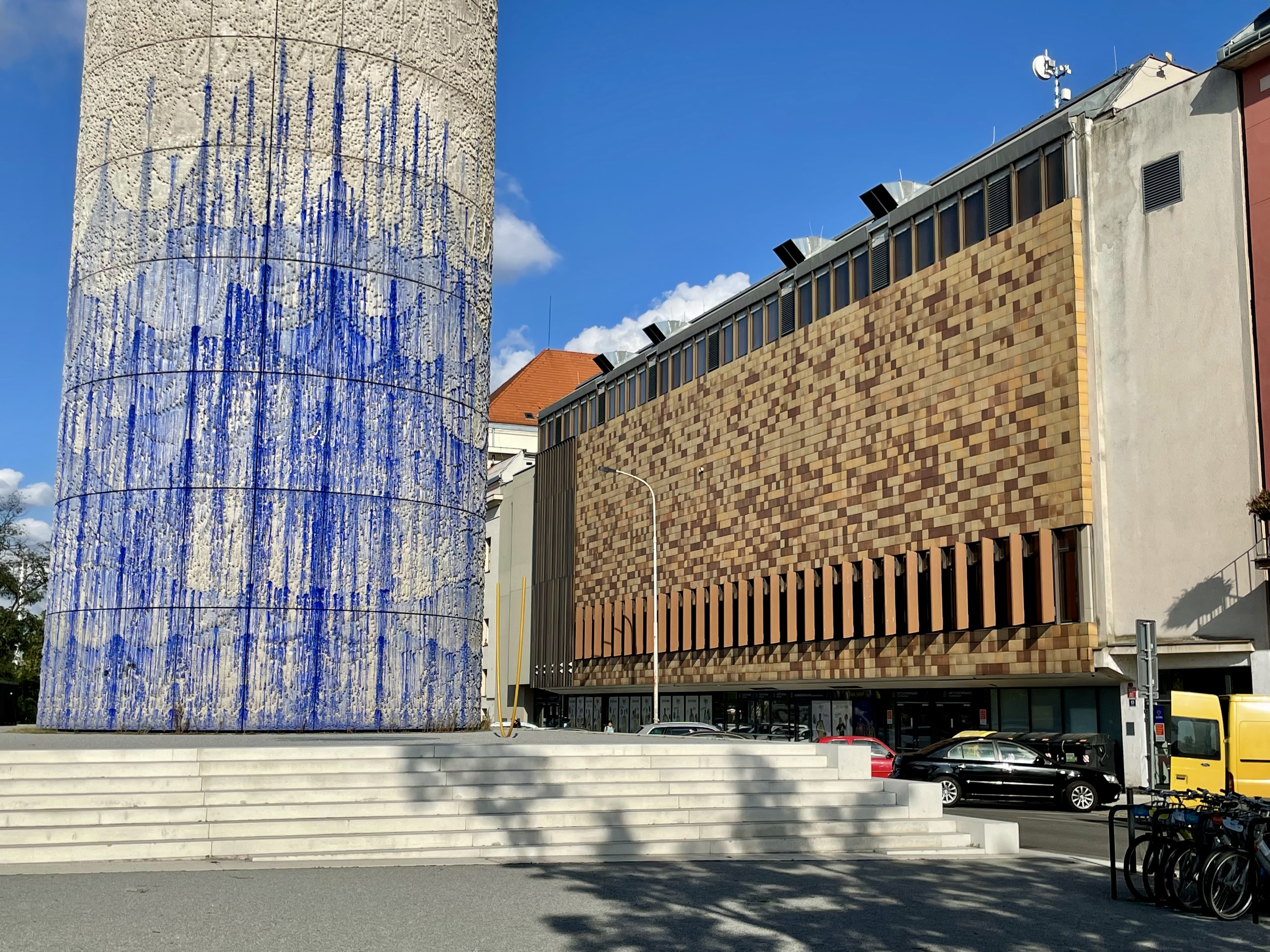
- Královka Arena in 2023
- Interactive map of Královka sports hall
- Location: Letná, Prague 7, Czech Republic
- Coordinates: 50°6′4.84″N 14°24′58.77″E
- Owner: City of Prague
- Operator: Sportovní areál Praha
- Capacity: 2500 (maximum), 1300 normal
- Scoreboard: Yes
- Public transit: Sparta (tram)

Construction
- Built: 1965
- Renovated: 1990, 2004, 2014
- Architect: Cyril Mandel (1965)

Tenant
- Women's USK Praha basketball team

Královka Arena or Královka sports Hall (Czech: Sportovní hala Královka) is multipurpose hall located in the Prague 7 district of Letná, near Stadion Letná. Sports and cultural events are held there. It has a maximum capacity of 2500 people, 1300 without an additional grandstand. It can host sports such as basketball, badminton and floorball. There is a training centre with a capacity of 200 people included within the complex.

Since 2014, it is home to women basketball team USK Praha and VŠ Praha. Basketball Nymburk played its major international matches in this arena.

== History ==
The arena in Pod Královskou oborou street was built in 1965. The first reconstruction started in 1985 and ended five years later. Further reconstruction took place in 2004. In 2010, Prague bought this arena for 116 million Czech crowns. Since 2011, the hall is rented by company Sportovní areál Praha. Between 2011 and 2014, another reconstruction took place, at a cost of around 240 million Czech crowns.

== Events ==
- 2015 EuroLeague Women final
- 2023 EuroLeague Women final
- EuroBasket Women 2017 (co-host with O2 Arena (Prague) and Zimní stadion Hradec Králové; Group Phase and Qualification for quarter-finals were held here)
