= Héléna Ciak =

French basketball player (born 1989)

Helena Ciak
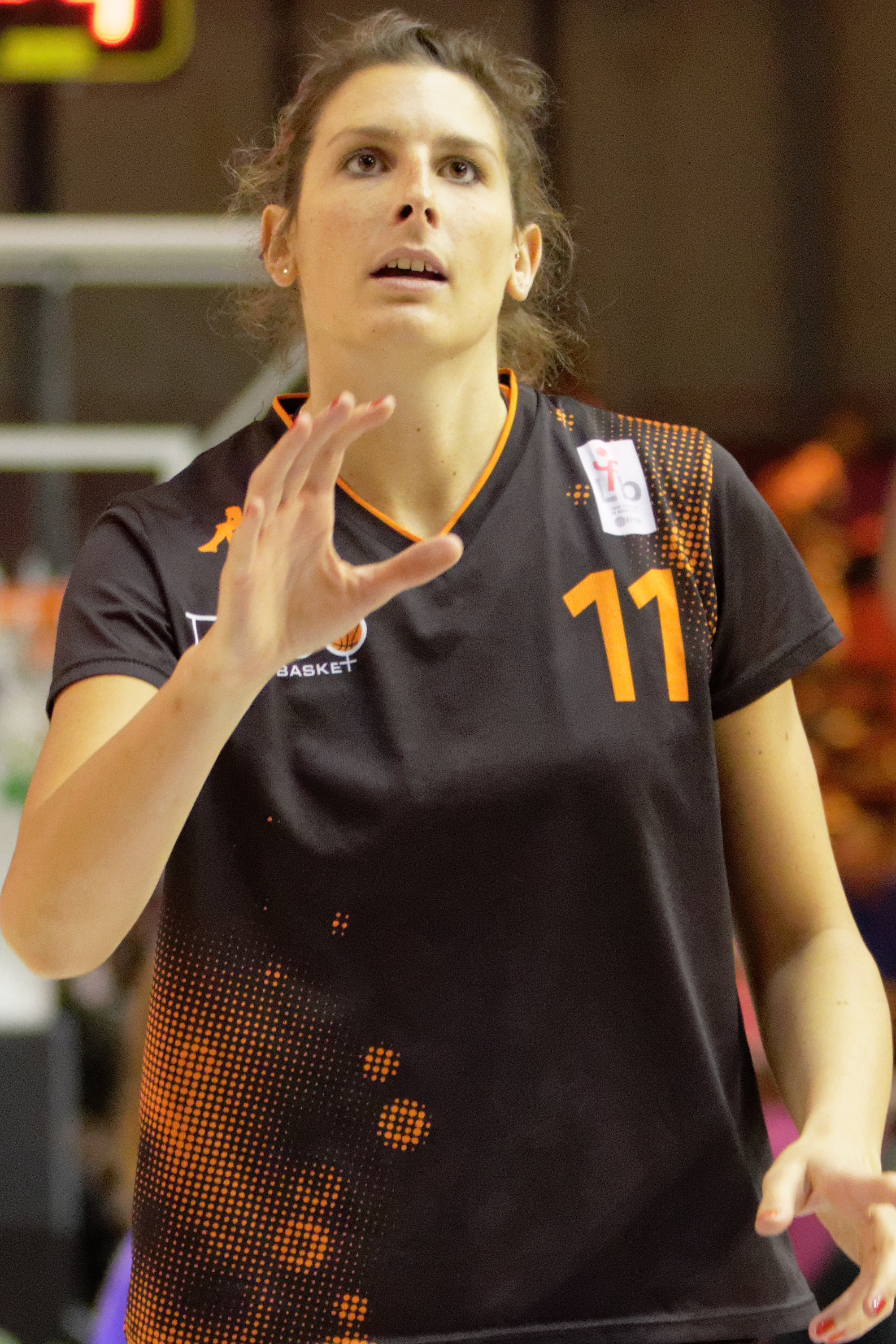
- Ciak in 2015

No. 8 – LDLC ASVEL
- Position: Center
- League: Ligue Féminine de Basketball

Personal information
- Born: 15 December 1989 (age 36) Dunkirk, France
- Listed height: 6 ft 6 in (1.98 m)
- Listed weight: 190 lb (86 kg)

Career information
- WNBA draft: 2011: undrafted
- Playing career: 2010–present

Career history
- 2010–2011: Roche Vendée BC
- 2011–2013: BC Perpignan Méditerranée
- 2013–2014: Basket Lattes
- 2014–2016: Tango Bourges Basket
- 2016–2018: Dynamo Kursk
- 2018–2019: Basket Lattes
- 2019–present: Lyon ASVEL
Medals
Women's basketball
Representing France
Olympic Games
Bronze medal – third place	2020 Tokyo	Team
EuroBasket
Silver medal – second place	2015 Hungary/Romania
Silver medal – second place	2017 Czech Republic
Silver medal – second place	2021 Spain/France

Helena Ciak (born 15 December 1989) is a French basketball player for Lyon ASVEL and the French national team, where she participated at the 2014 FIBA World Championship. Ciak switched to Dynamo Kursk in 2016 and won with her team the EuroLeague.
