= Anete Šteinberga =

Latvian basketball player

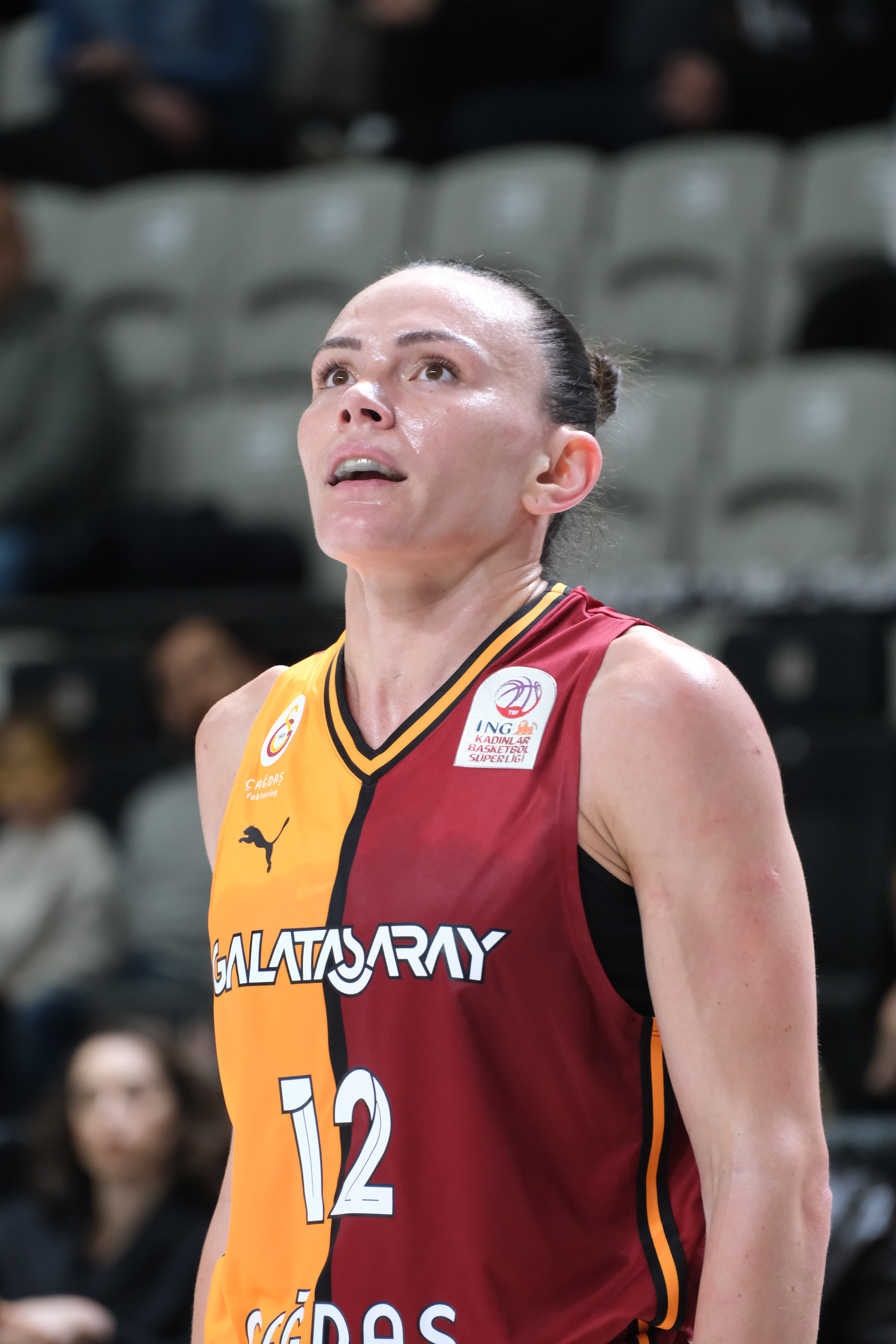

Famila Basket Schio
- Position: Center

Personal information
- Born: 29 January 1990 (age 36) Ogre, Latvia
- Listed height: 6 ft 3 in (1.91 m)
- Listed weight: 176 lb (80 kg)

Career information
- College: UTEP (2009–13)
- WNBA draft: 2013: undrafted

Career history
- 2006–2009: TTT Riga
- 2013–2015: Castors Braine
- 2015–2016: Chevakata Vologda
- 2016–2017: USK Praha
- 2017–2018: BC Castors Braine
- 2018–2020: Reyer Venezia
- 2020–2022: Galatasaray
- 2022–2024: Tango Bourges Basket
- 2024–2025: Galatasaray
- 2025–: Famila Basket Schio

Anete Šteinberga (born 29 January 1990) is a Latvian basketball player for Famila Basket Schio and the Latvian national team. She participated at the EuroBasket Women 2017.

== Professional career ==
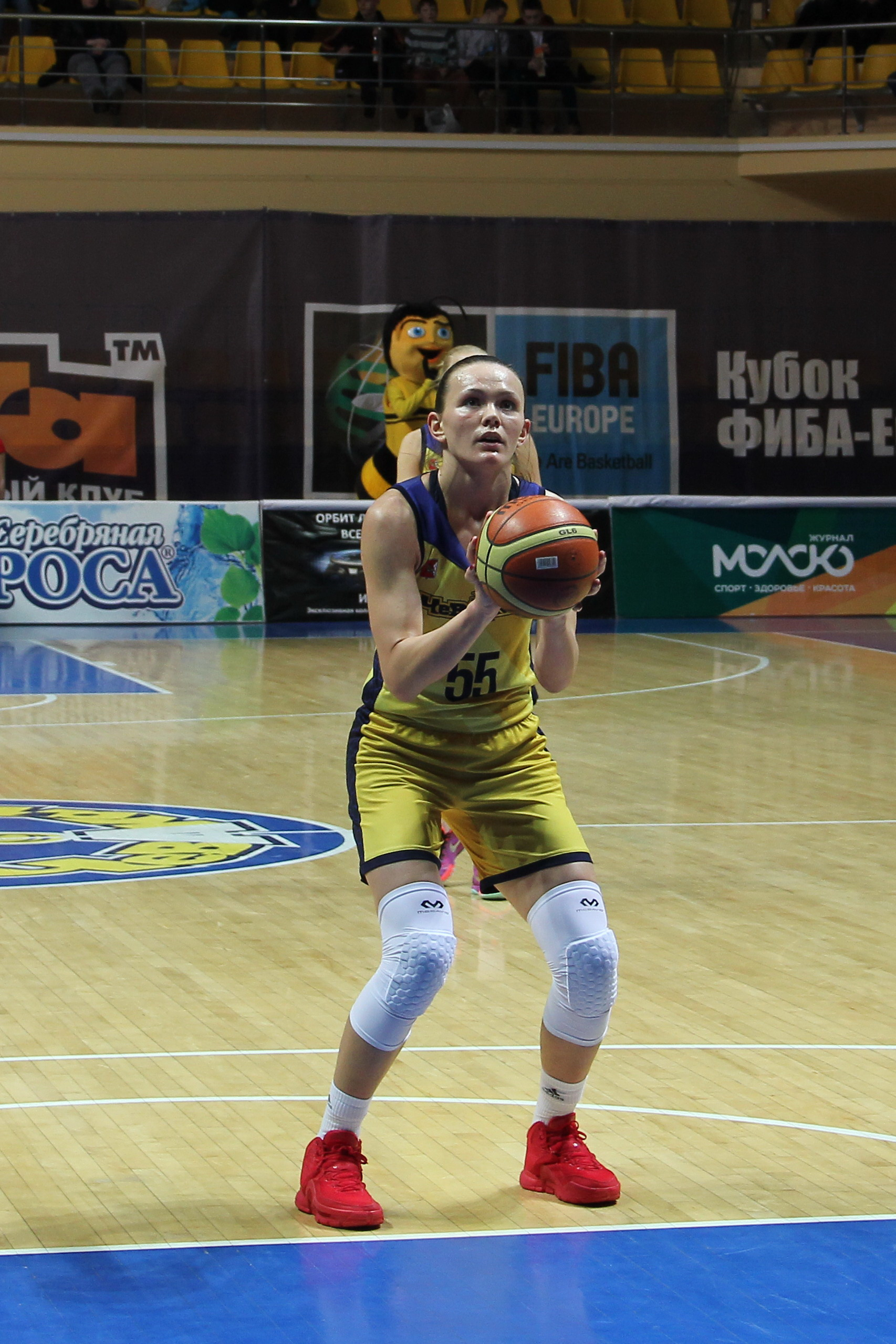
Steinberga in 2016

On 2 December 2024, she signed a contract with Galatasaray until the end of the 2024–25 season.

== National Team career ==
With the Latvian U-20 national team, she won the 3rd place at the 2009 European U-20 Championship and repeated this success at the 2010 championship in Latvia.

== University of Texas at El Paso statistics ==
Ratios
Year	Team	GP	FG%	3P%	FT%	RBG	APG	BPG	SPG	PPG
2009-10	UTEP	17	46.4%	14.3%	49.3%	7.41	1.35	0.41	1.00	9.59
2010-11	UTEP	24	47.6%	-	50.8%	4.38	1.42	0.17	0.46	7.88
2011-12	UTEP	33	45.2%	-	60.4%	3.42	0.82	0.36	0.42	5.21
2012-13	UTEP	32	44.0%	40.0%	72.2%	7.41	1.59	0.44	0.84	15.63
Career		106	45.3%	18.8%	61.9%	5.48	1.27	0.35	0.65	9.66

Totals
Year	Team	GP	FG	FGA	3P	3PA	FT	FTA	REB	A	BK	ST	PTS
2009-10	UTEP	17	64	138	1	7	34	69	126	23	7	17	163
2010-11	UTEP	24	79	166	0	2	31	61	105	34	4	11	189
2011-12	UTEP	33	70	155	0	2	32	53	113	27	12	14	172
2012-13	UTEP	32	192	436	2	5	114	158	237	51	14	27	500
Career		106	405	895	3	16	211	341	581	135	37	69	1024
