= EuroBasket Women 2017 =

2017 edition of the EuroBasket Women

EuroBasket 2017 Women
36th FIBA European Women's Basketball Championship

Tournament details
- Host country: Czech Republic
- Dates: 16–25 June
- Teams: 16 (from 1 federation)
- Venue: 3 (in 2 host cities)

Final positions
- Champions: Spain (3rd title)
- Runners-up: France
- Third place: Belgium
- Fourth place: Greece

Tournament statistics
- MVP: (Spain) Alba Torrens
- Top scorer: (Ukraine) Iagupova (21.3)
- Top rebounds: (Russia) Vadeeva (12.3)
- Top assists: (Ukraine) Iagupova (5.5)
- PPG (Team): Russia (70.5)
- RPG (Team): Russia (49.8)
- APG (Team): Belgium (19.0)

Official website
- 2017 EuroBasket Women

The 2017 European Women Basketball Championship, commonly called EuroBasket Women 2017, was the 36th edition of the continental tournament in women's basketball, sanctioned by the FIBA Europe. The tournament was awarded to Czech Republic after winning the bid to Serbia. The tournament also serves as a qualification for the 2018 FIBA Women's Basketball World Cup in Spain, with the top five nations qualifying. As hosts Spain finished in the top five, the sixth placed team also qualified.

The championship was reverted to a 16 teams championship, after the 20 teams that participated in 2015.

Spain defeated France 71–55 in the final to win their third title.

In total, 61 556 people visited this event.

== Bidding process ==
The bids were as follows:

- Czech Republic
- Serbia

On the 28 June 2015, Czech Republic won the hosting rights.

== Venues ==
Prague		Hradec Králové	EuroBasket Women 2017 is located in Czech Republic
O2 Arena	Královka Arena	Zimní stadion Hradec Králové	EuroBasket Women 2017 is located in Czech Republic
Final Phase	Group Phase, Qualification for Quarter-Finals	Group Phase, Qualification for Quarter-Finals	EuroBasket Women 2017 is located in Czech Republic
Capacity: 17,000	Capacity: 2,500	Capacity: 7,000	EuroBasket Women 2017 is located in Czech Republic

== Qualification ==
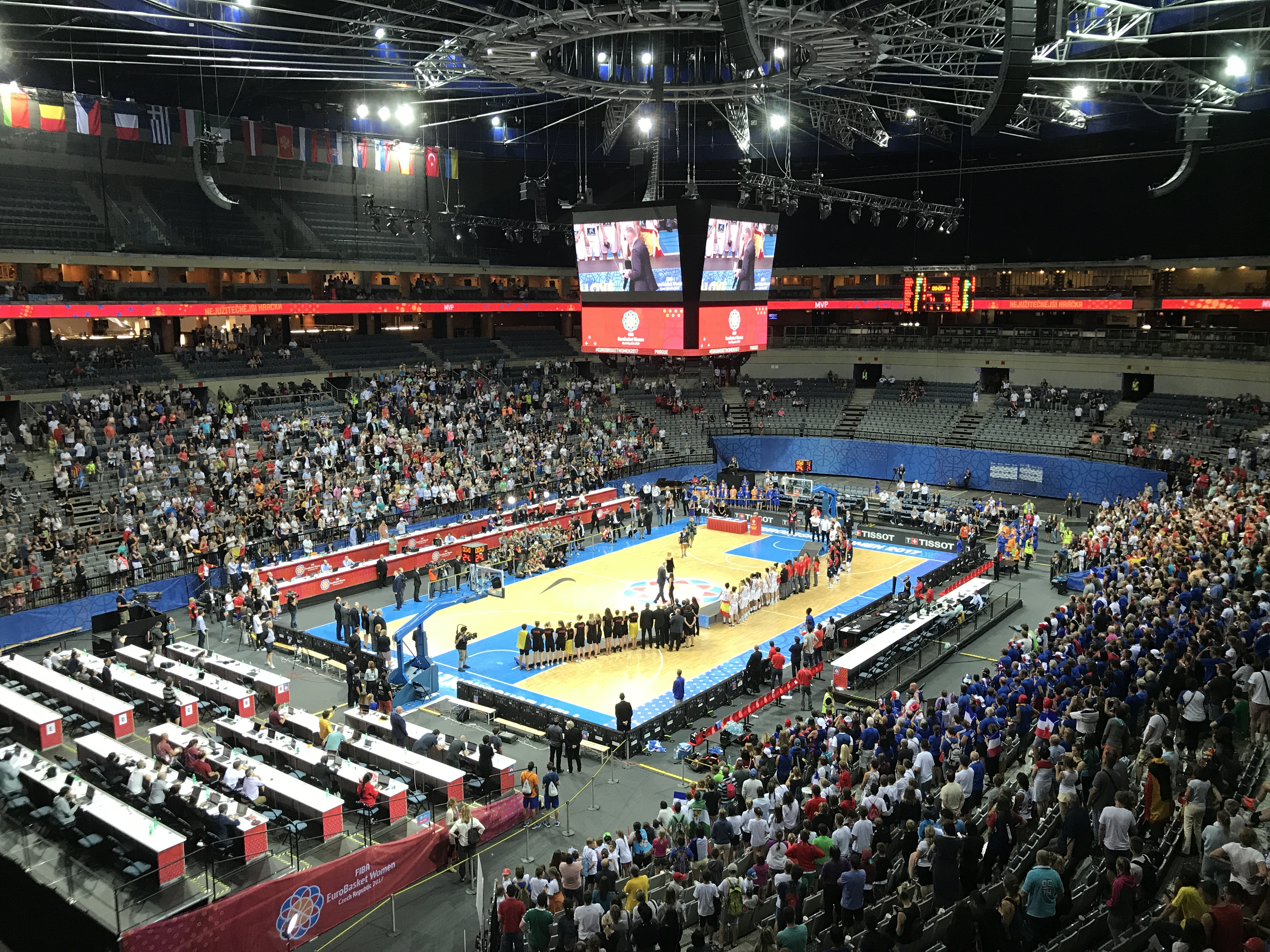
Prague O2 Arena during the final ceremony

=== Qualified teams ===
Country	Qualified as	Date of qualification	Last appearance	Best placement in tournament	WR
Czech Republic	Host nation	28 June 2015	2015	Champions (2005)	5th
Spain	Winners of Qualification Group I	24 February 2016	2015	Champions (1993, 2013)	2nd
France	Winners of Qualification Group B	19 November 2016	2015	Champions (2001, 2009)	3rd
Italy	Winners of Qualification Group C	19 November 2016	2015	Champions (1938)	31st
Slovenia	Winners of Qualification Group A	19 November 2016	–	Debut	NR
Turkey	Winners of Qualification Group H	19 November 2016	2015	Runners-up (2011)	7th
Ukraine	Winners of Qualification Group D	19 November 2016	2015	Champions (1995)	41st
Belgium	Winners of Qualification Group G	23 November 2016	2007	6th Place (2003)	NR
Hungary	Winners of Qualification Group E	23 November 2016	2015	Runners-up (1950, 1956)	50th
Russia	Winners of Qualification Group F	23 November 2016	2015	Champions (2003, 2007, 2011)	11th
Belarus	Top 6 ranked of 2nd-placed teams in Qualification	23 November 2016	2015	3rd Place (2007)	12th
Greece	Top 6 ranked of 2nd-placed teams in Qualification	23 November 2016	2015	5th Place (2009)	20th
Latvia	Top 6 ranked of 2nd-placed teams in Qualification	23 November 2016	2015	4th Place (2007)	27th
Montenegro	Top 6 ranked of 2nd-placed teams in Qualification	23 November 2016	2015	6th Place (2011)	27th
Serbia	Top 6 ranked of 2nd-placed teams in Qualification	23 November 2016	2015	Champions (2015)	9th
Slovakia	Top 6 ranked of 2nd-placed teams in Qualification	23 November 2016	2015	Runners-up (1997)	27th

== Draw ==
The draw took place in Prague on 9 December 2016.

=== Seedings ===
Pot 1	Pot 2	Pot 3	Pot 4
France; Spain; Russia; Turkey	Serbia; Belarus; Ukraine; Montenegro	Greece; Slovakia; Czech Republic; Latvia	Italy; Hungary; Belgium; Slovenia

== Squads ==
All rosters consisted of 12 players.

== First round ==
=== Group A ===
Pos	Team	Pld	W	L	PF	PA	PD	Pts	Qualification
1	Spain	3	2	1	201	169	+32	5 (Note: Spain 76–54 Ukraine)	Quarterfinals
2	Ukraine	3	2	1	197	195	+2	5	Qualification for quarterfinals
3	Hungary	3	1	2	194	216	−22	4 (Note: Czech Republic 70–74 Hungary)	Qualification for quarterfinals
4	Czech Republic (H)	3	1	2	184	196	−12	4	

Source: FIBA
Rules for classification: 1) Points; 2) Head-to-head results; 3) Points difference; 4) Points scored.
(H) Hosts
Notes:

16 June 2017
Ukraine	59–47	Czech Republic
Hungary	48–62	Spain
17 June 2017
Spain	76–54	Ukraine
Czech Republic	70–74	Hungary
19 June 2017
Hungary	72–84	Ukraine
Czech Republic	67–63	Spain

=== Group B ===
Pos	Team	Pld	W	L	PF	PA	PD	Pts	Qualification
1	Turkey	3	3	0	211	185	+26	6	Quarterfinals
2	Italy	3	2	1	201	175	+26	5	Qualification for quarterfinals
3	Slovakia	3	1	2	187	196	−9	4	Qualification for quarterfinals
4	Belarus	3	0	3	193	236	−43	3	

Source: FIBA
Rules for classification: 1) Points; 2) Head-to-head results; 3) Points difference; 4) Points scored.

16 June 2017
Belarus	60–80	Italy
Turkey	69–58	Slovakia
17 June 2017
Slovakia	68–59	Belarus
Italy	53–54	Turkey
19 June 2017
Belarus	74–88	Turkey
Slovakia	61–68	Italy

=== Group C ===
Pos	Team	Pld	W	L	PF	PA	PD	Pts	Qualification
1	France	3	3	0	213	188	+25	6	Quarterfinals
2	Serbia	3	1	2	205	211	−6	4 (Note: Serbia 3 Pts, +10 PD; Greece 3 Pts, +6 PD; Slovenia 3 Pts, −16 PD)	Qualification for quarterfinals
3	Greece	3	1	2	188	189	−1	4	Qualification for quarterfinals
4	Slovenia	3	1	2	196	214	−18	4	

Source: FIBA
Rules for classification: 1) Points; 2) Head-to-head results; 3) Points difference; 4) Points scored.
Notes:

16 June 2017
Serbia	60–69	Greece
Slovenia	68–70	France
17 June 2017
Greece	56–59	Slovenia
France	73–57	Serbia
19 June 2017
Serbia	88–69	Slovenia
France	70–63	Greece

=== Group D ===
Pos	Team	Pld	W	L	PF	PA	PD	Pts	Qualification
1	Belgium	3	3	0	204	197	+7	6	Quarterfinals
2	Russia	3	2	1	224	189	+35	5	Qualification for quarterfinals
3	Latvia	3	1	2	193	188	+5	4	Qualification for quarterfinals
4	Montenegro	3	0	3	173	220	−47	3	

Source: FIBA
Rules for classification: 1) Points; 2) Head-to-head results; 3) Points difference; 4) Points scored.

16 June 2017
Belgium	66–64	Montenegro
Latvia	59–71	Russia
17 June 2017
Montenegro	55–76	Latvia
Russia	75–76 (OT)	Belgium
19 June 2017
Latvia	58–62	Belgium
Montenegro	54–78	Russia

== Final round ==
Qualification for quarterfinals
20 June 2017
Serbia	70
Latvia	75
20 June 2017
Italy	49
Hungary	48
20 June 2017
Russia	58
Greece	62
20 June 2017
Ukraine	68
Slovakia	82

Quarterfinals
22 June 2017
Spain	67
Latvia	47
22 June 2017
Belgium	79
Italy	66
22 June 2017
Turkey	55
Greece	84
22 June 2017
France	67
Slovakia	40

Semifinals
24 June 2017
Spain	68
Belgium	52
24 June 2017
Greece	55
France	77

Final
25 June 2017
Spain	71
France	55
Third place game
25 June 2017
Belgium	78
Greece	45

5–8th place bracket

5–8th place semifinals
24 June 2017
Latvia	68
Italy	67
24 June 2017
Turkey	72
Slovakia	56

Fifth place game
25 June 2017
Latvia	63
Turkey	72
Seventh place game
25 June 2017
Italy	71
Slovakia	54

=== Final ===
25 June 2017
20:30

Boxscore

Spain	71–55	France
Scoring by quarter: 21–18, 18–12, 17–10, 15–15
Pts: Lyttle 19; Rebs: Lyttle 8 Asts: Cruz 5		Pts: Dumerc 15; Rebs: Époupa, Amant 4 Asts: four players 2

O2 Arena, Prague
Attendance: 4,500
Referees: Janusz Calik (POL), Michele Rossi (ITA), Özlem Yalman (TUR)

== Final ranking ==
Qualified as the host nation for the 2018 FIBA Women's Basketball World Cup.
Qualified for the 2018 FIBA Women's Basketball World Cup

Rank	Team	Record
Gold medal	Spain	5–1
Silver medal	France	5–1
Bronze medal	Belgium	5–1
4th	Greece	3–4
5th	Turkey	5–1
6th	Latvia	3–4
7th	Italy	4–3
8th	Slovakia	2–5
9th	Russia	2–2
10th	Ukraine	2–2
11th	Serbia	1–3
12th	Hungary	1–3
13th	Czech Republic	1–2
14th	Slovenia	1–2
15th	Belarus	0–3
16th	Montenegro	0–3

== Statistics and awards ==
=== Statistical leaders ===
Points

Name	PPG
(Ukraine) Alina Iagupova	21.3
(Italy) Cecilia Zandalasini	19.0
(Spain) Alba Torrens	17.8
(Turkey) Quanitra Hollingsworth	17.7
(Belgium) Emma Meesseman	17.5

Rebounds

Name	RPG
(Russia) Maria Vadeeva	12.3
(Latvia) Anete Šteinberga	11.1
(Italy) Cecilia Zandalasini	9.6
(Turkey) Quanitra Hollingsworth	9.3
(Ukraine) Taisiia Udodenko	9.3

Assists

Name	APG
(Ukraine) Alina Iagupova	5.5
(Russia) Epiphanny Prince	5.0
(Belgium) Marjorie Carpreaux	4.5
(Turkey) Işıl Alben	4.5
(Turkey) Birsel Vardarlı	4.5

Blocks

Name	BPG
(Belgium) Emma Meesseman	1.7
(Belgium) Ann Wauters	1.5
(Hungary) Bernadett Határ	1.3
(Spain) Laura Nicholls	1.2
(Hungary) Tijana Krivacevic	1.0
(Russia) Zhosselina Maiga	1.0
(Russia) Maria Vadeeva	1.0

Steals

Name	SPG
(France) Olivia Époupa	2.7
(Spain) Sancho Lyttle	2.7
(Ukraine) Taisiia Udodenko	2.5
(Russia) Epiphanny Prince	2.3
(Belgium) Marjorie Carpreaux	2.2
(Spain) Alba Torrens	2.2

=== Awards ===
All-Star Team
Guards	Center	Forwards
(Greece) Evanthia Maltsi (Spain) Alba Torrens	(Belgium) Emma Meesseman	(Italy) Cecilia Zandalasini (France) Endéné Miyem
MVP: (Spain) Alba Torrens
