= ČPP Arena =

Arena in Hradec Králové, Czech Republic

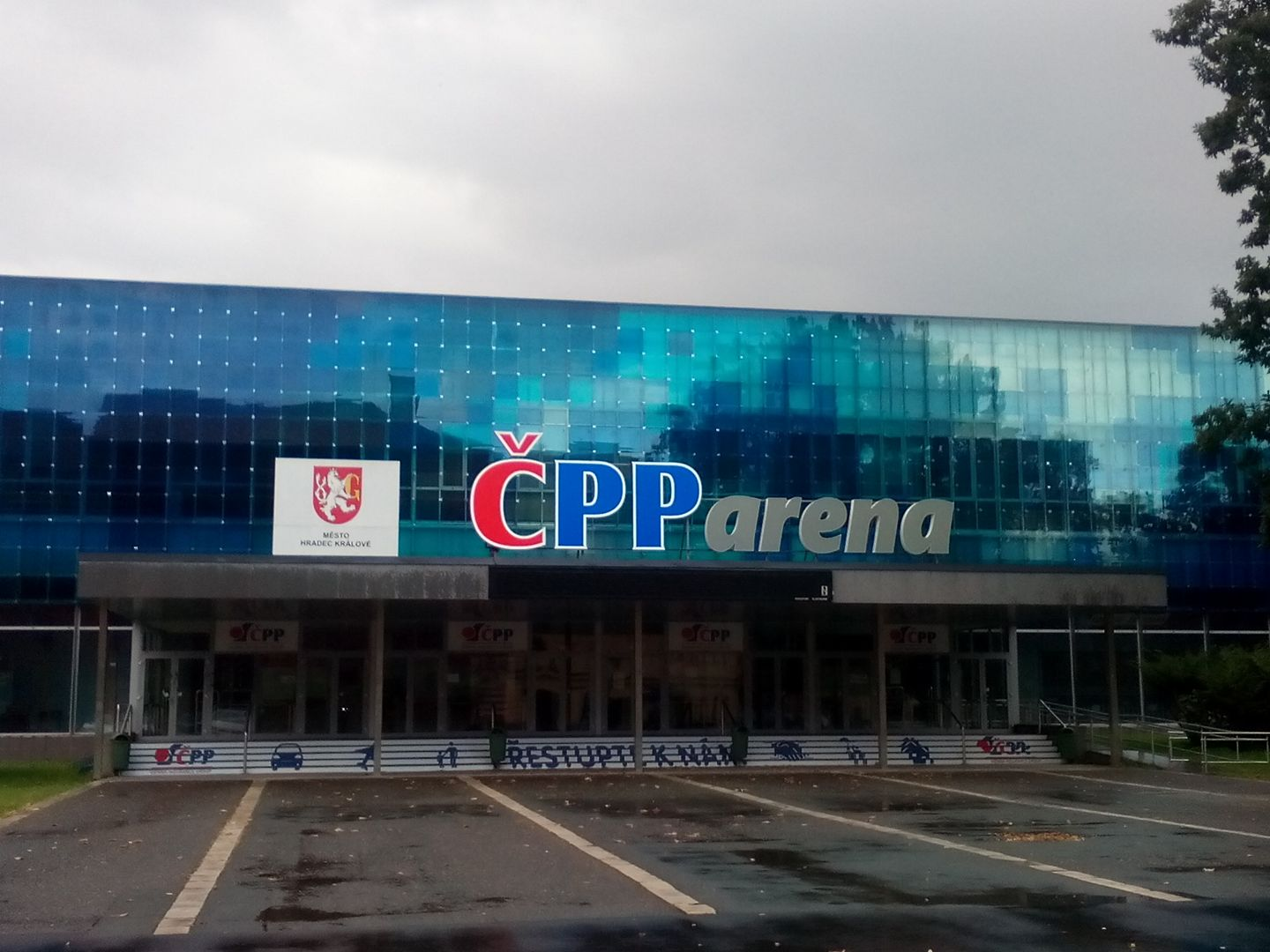
- Interactive map of ČPP Arena
- Former names: Zimní stadion Hradec Králové; ČEZ Stadion Hradec Králové; Fortuna aréna
- Location: Komenského 1214/2, Hradec Králové, Czech Republic, 500 03
- Coordinates: 50°12′23.61″N 15°49′45.11″E
- Owner: Hradec Králové
- Operator: Mountfield HK, a.s.
- Capacity: 6,890
- Field size: 30 m × 60 m (98 ft × 197 ft)

Construction
- Groundbreaking: 1955
- Opened: 1957
- Renovated: 1969–1976
- Expanded: 1976, 2001
- Architect: František Křelina

Tenant
- Mountfield HK

ČPP Arena, is an arena in Hradec Králové, Czech Republic. It is primarily used for ice hockey, and is the home to the Mountfield HK of the Czech Extraliga. It opened in 1957 and holds 6,890 spectators.
