= FIBA All-Star Five =

FIBA All-Star Five may refer to:

- FIBA AfroBasket All-Tournament Team
- FIBA AfroBasket Women All-Tournament Team
- FIBA AmeriCup All-Tournament Team
- FIBA Women's AmeriCup All-Tournament Team
- FIBA Asia Cup All-Tournament Team
- FIBA Women's Asia Cup All-Tournament Team
- FIBA Basketball World Cup All-Tournament Team
- FIBA Women's Basketball World Cup All-Tournament Team
- FIBA EuroBasket All-Tournament Team
- FIBA EuroBasket Women All-Tournament Team
- FIBA Men's Olympics All-Star Five
- FIBA Women's Olympics All-Star Five
- FIBA Under-17 Basketball World Cup All-Tournament Team
- FIBA Under-17 Women's Basketball World Cup All-Tournament Team
- FIBA Under-19 Basketball World Cup All-Tournament Team
- FIBA Under-19 Women's Basketball World Cup All-Tournament Team
