= FIBA EuroBasket Women Most Valuable Player =

Basketball award

The EuroBasket Women Most Valuable Player Award is a FIBA award given every two years, to the Most Outstanding player throughout the tournament.

== Winners ==
	Denotes player whose team won that years tournament
	Denotes player inducted into the FIBA Hall of Fame
	Denotes player who is still active
Player (X)	Denotes the number of times the player had been named MVP at that time
Team (X)	Denotes the number of times a player from this team had won at that time

Year	Player	Position	Team	Ref.
2001	Catherine Melain	Guard	France	
2003	Lucie Blahůšková	Center	Czech Republic	
2005	Maria Stepanova	Center	Russia	
2007	Amaya Valdemoro	Forward	Spain	
2009	Evanthia Maltsi	Guard	Greece	
2011	Elena Danilochkina	Guard	Russia (2)	
2013	Sancho Lyttle	Forward	Spain (2)	
2015	Ana Dabović	Guard	Serbia	
2017	Alba Torrens	Guard	Spain (3)	
2019	Astou Ndour	Center	Spain (4)	
2021	Sonja Vasić	Forward	Serbia (2)	
2023	Emma Meesseman	Forward	Belgium	
2025	Emma Meesseman (2)	Forward	Belgium (2)	

== See also ==
- FIBA EuroBasket Women All-Tournament Team
- FIBA Women's Basketball World Cup Most Valuable Player
- FIBA Women's Basketball World Cup All-Tournament Team
- FIBA Awards
