= FIBA EuroBasket Women All-Tournament Team =

The EuroBasket Women All-Tournament Team is a FIBA award given every two years, awarded to the five strongest competitors throughout the tournament.

== Honourees ==
Year	Player	Position	Team	Ref.
2005	Hana Machová	Guard	Czech Republic	
2005	Amaya Valdemoro	Forward	Spain	
2005	Eva Vítečková	Forward	Czech Republic	
2005	Tatiana Shchegoleva	Forward	Russia	
2005	Maria Stepanova	Center	Russia	
2007	Natallia Marchanka	Guard	Belarus	
2007	Anete Jēkabsone-Žogota	Guard	Latvia	
2007	Amaya Valdemoro (2)	Forward	Spain	
2007	Olga Arteshina	Forward	Russia	
2007	Maria Stepanova (2)	Center	Russia	
2009	Céline Dumerc	Guard	France	
2009	Evanthia Maltsi	Guard	Greece	
2009	Anete Jēkabsone-Žogota (2)	Guard	Latvia	
2009	Svetlana Abrosimova	Forward	Russia	
2009	Sandrine Gruda	Center	France	
2011	Sandra Mandir	Guard	Croatia	
2011	Elena Danilochkina	Guard	Russia	
2011	Eva Vítečková (2)	Forward	Czech Republic	
2011	Nevriye Yılmaz	Center	Turkey	
2011	Maria Stepanova (3)	Center	Russia	
2013	Céline Dumerc (2)	Guard	France	
2013	Frida Eldebrink	Guard	Sweden	
2013	Alba Torrens	Guard	Spain	
2013	Isabelle Yacoubou	Center	France	
2013	Sancho Lyttle	Center	Spain	
2015	Céline Dumerc (3)	Guard	France	
2015	Ana Dabović	Guard	Serbia	
2015	Alba Torrens (2)	Guard	Spain	
2015	Sonja Petrović	Forward	Serbia	
2015	Sandrine Gruda (2)	Center	France	
2017	Evanthia Maltsi (2)	Guard	Greece	
2017	Alba Torrens (3)	Guard	Spain	
2017	Cecilia Zandalasini	Forward	Italy	
2017	Endéné Miyem	Forward	France	
2017	Emma Meesseman	Center	Belgium	
2019	Marta Xargay	Guard	Spain	
2019	Sonja Petrović (2)	Forward	Serbia	
2019	Temi Fagbenle	Forward	Great Britain	
2019	Sandrine Gruda (3)	Center	France	
2019	Astou Ndour	Center	Spain	
2021	Julie Allemand	Guard	Belgium	
2021	Sonja Vasić (3)	Forward	Serbia	
2021	Endéné Miyem (2)	Forward	France	
2021	Emma Meesseman (2)	Center	Belgium	
2021	Jonquel Jones	Center	Bosnia and Herzegovina	
2023	Julie Allemand (2)	Guard	Belgium	
2023	Julie Vanloo	Guard	Belgium	
2023	Alba Torrens (4)	Forward	Spain	
2023	Emma Meesseman (3)	Center	Belgium	
2023	Sandrine Gruda (4)	Center	France	
2025	Julie Allemand (3)	Guard	Belgium	
2025	Cecilia Zandalasini (2)	Guard	Italy	
2025	Alba Torrens (5)	Forward	Spain	
2025	Emma Meesseman (4)	Center	Belgium	
2025	Raquel Carrera	Center	Spain	

== See also ==
- FIBA EuroBasket Women Most Valuable Player
- FIBA Women's Basketball World Cup Most Valuable Player
- FIBA Women's Basketball World Cup All-Tournament Team
- FIBA Awards
