= FIBA Women's Asia Cup Most Valuable Player =

The FIBA Women's Asia Cup Most Valuable Player Award is a FIBA award given every two years, to the Most Outstanding player throughout the tournament.

== Winners ==
	Denotes player whose team won that years tournament
	Denotes player inducted into the FIBA Hall of Fame
	Denotes player who is still active
Player (X)	Denotes the number of times the player had been named MVP at that time
Team (X)	Denotes the number of times a player from this team had won at that time

Year	Player	Position	Team	Ref.
1968	Annie Goh Koon Gee	–	Malaysia	
1970	Takeko Arakaki	–	Japan	
1982	Park Chan-sook	–	South Korea	
1997	Yoo Young-joo	–	South Korea	
1999	Chun Joo-weon	Guard	South Korea	
2001	Hu Xiaotao	Forward	China	
2004	Miao Lijie	Forward	China	
2009	Bian Lan	Forward	China	
2011	Miao Lijie (2)	Forward	China	
2013	Ramu Tokashiki	Forward	Japan	
2015	Ramu Tokashiki (2)	Forward	Japan	
2017	Kelsey Griffin	Forward	Australia	
2019	Nako Motohashi	Guard	Japan	
2021	Himawari Akaho	Forward	Japan	
2023	Han Xu	Center	China	
2025	Alexandra Fowler	Forward	Australia	

== See also ==
- FIBA Women's Asia Cup All-Tournament Team
- FIBA Women's Basketball World Cup Most Valuable Player
- FIBA Women's Basketball World Cup All-Tournament Team
- FIBA Awards
