= Basketball at the 2024 Summer Olympics – Women's qualification =

The women's qualification for the Olympic basketball tournament occurred between 2022 and 2024; all five FIBA (International Basketball Federation) zones were expected to have a representation in the Olympic basketball event.

As the host nation, France reserved a quota place in the women's 5×5 basketball; this was confirmed by a FIBA Central Board decision on 30 April 2023. The first spot will be directly awarded to the winner of 2022 FIBA Women's Basketball World Cup, held in Sydney, Australia from 22 September to 1 October 2022.

These two directly qualified teams, however, were eligible to compete in two successive stages, namely the FIBA Olympic Pre-qualifying tournaments (for Africa, Americas, and Asia and Oceania) or FIBA Women's EuroBasket (for Europe) and the four-way global FIBA Olympic qualifying tournaments (FOQTs). While two FOQTs attributed the Paris 2024 spots to their top three teams, the other half of the four FOQT pathways, featuring the host nation France and the World Cup winner, provided quota places to the two highest-ranked teams.

== Method ==
Twelve teams participated in the women's basketball tournament, with each NOC sending a roster of 12 players.

=== Host nation ===
As the host nation, France reserved a direct quota place in the women's basketball subject to the FIBA Central Board decision originally to be made on 30 June 2023. Their automatic qualification was confirmed by the FIBA Central Board decision on 30 April 2023.

=== Qualification process ===
The first spot was directly awarded to the winner of 2022 FIBA Women's Basketball World Cup, held in Sydney, Australia from 22 September to 1 October 2022. Similar to the pre-Olympic format in Tokyo 2020, two directly qualified teams, the host nation France and the World Cup winner, were eligible to compete at the FIBA Women's Olympic pre-qualifying tournaments (for Africa, Americas, and Asia and Oceania) or FIBA Women's EuroBasket (for Europe) and the four-way global FIBA Women's Olympic qualifying tournaments (FWOQTs).

National teams from Africa, the Americas, and Asia (including Oceania) played in the FIBA Women's Olympic pre-qualifying tournaments (FWOPQTs). In Africa, Asia/Oceania and Europe, teams qualitied directly through each FIBA women's Continental Cup. In Americas, four national teams played in order to qualify for one of four global FIBA Women's Olympic Qualifying Tournaments. Accordingly, the two first placed teams in the FIBA Women's Olympic Pre-Qualifying Tournament were qualified for the FIBA Women's Olympic Qualifying Tournaments, that took place in February 2024. USA (winner of the FIBA Women's World Cup 2022) plus the best following ranked team in the FIBA Women's AmeriCup 2023 were directly qualified for the FIBA Women's Olympic Qualifying Tournaments 2024.

The four-way global FIBA Women's Olympic qualifying tournament, held in February 2024, was contested by the following top sixteen teams across all continents based on the results from the FWOPQTs. The three highest-ranked teams (including the host nation and the World Cup winner) from each of the four tournaments completed the women's basketball lineup for Paris 2024.

- AfroBasket Women – two teams advanced through 2023 Women's Afrobasket
- FIBA Women's AmeriCup – two teams advanced through FWOPQT for Americas, 1 team advanced through 2023 FIBA Women's AmeriCup and the United States advanced through winning the 2022 FIBA Women's Basketball World Cup.
- FIBA Women's Asia Cup – four teams advanced through 2023 FIBA Women's Asia Cup
- EuroBasket Women – six teams advanced through EuroBasket Women 2023, including host nation France

== Qualified teams ==
The hosts for the qualifying tournaments were announced on 9 September 2023. The groups with USA and France qualified only two teams.

Qualification method	Date	Venue	Berths	Qualified team
Host nation	—	—	1	France
2022 FIBA Women's Basketball World Cup	22 September – 1 October 2022	(Australia) Sydney	1	United States
2024 FIBA Women's Olympic Qualifying Tournaments	8–11 February 2024	(China) Xi'an	2	China
2024 FIBA Women's Olympic Qualifying Tournaments	8–11 February 2024	(China) Xi'an	2	Puerto Rico
2024 FIBA Women's Olympic Qualifying Tournaments	8–11 February 2024	(Belgium) Antwerp	2	Belgium
2024 FIBA Women's Olympic Qualifying Tournaments	8–11 February 2024	(Belgium) Antwerp	2	Nigeria
2024 FIBA Women's Olympic Qualifying Tournaments	8–11 February 2024	(Brazil) Belém	3	Australia
2024 FIBA Women's Olympic Qualifying Tournaments	8–11 February 2024	(Brazil) Belém	3	Germany
2024 FIBA Women's Olympic Qualifying Tournaments	8–11 February 2024	(Brazil) Belém	3	Serbia
2024 FIBA Women's Olympic Qualifying Tournaments	8–11 February 2024	(Hungary) Sopron	3	Japan
2024 FIBA Women's Olympic Qualifying Tournaments	8–11 February 2024	(Hungary) Sopron	3	Spain
2024 FIBA Women's Olympic Qualifying Tournaments	8–11 February 2024	(Hungary) Sopron	3	Canada
Total			12	

== FIBA Women's Olympic Qualifying Tournaments ==
Qualification method	Date	Venue	Berths	Qualified team
2022 FIBA Women's Basketball World Cup	22 September –1 October 2022	(Australia) Sydney	1	United States
EuroBasket Women 2023	15–25 June 2023	(Slovenia) Ljubljana (Israel) Tel Aviv	6	Belgium
EuroBasket Women 2023	15–25 June 2023	(Slovenia) Ljubljana (Israel) Tel Aviv	6	Spain
EuroBasket Women 2023	15–25 June 2023	(Slovenia) Ljubljana (Israel) Tel Aviv	6	France
EuroBasket Women 2023	15–25 June 2023	(Slovenia) Ljubljana (Israel) Tel Aviv	6	Hungary
EuroBasket Women 2023	15–25 June 2023	(Slovenia) Ljubljana (Israel) Tel Aviv	6	Serbia
EuroBasket Women 2023	15–25 June 2023	(Slovenia) Ljubljana (Israel) Tel Aviv	6	Germany
2023 FIBA Women's Asia Cup	26 June – 2 July 2023	(Australia) Sydney	4	China
2023 FIBA Women's Asia Cup	26 June – 2 July 2023	(Australia) Sydney	4	Japan
2023 FIBA Women's Asia Cup	26 June – 2 July 2023	(Australia) Sydney	4	Australia
2023 FIBA Women's Asia Cup	26 June – 2 July 2023	(Australia) Sydney	4	New Zealand
2023 FIBA Women's AmeriCup	1–9 July 2023	(Mexico) León	1	Brazil
2023 Women's Afrobasket	28 July – 6 August 2023	(Rwanda) Kigali	2	Nigeria
2023 Women's Afrobasket	28 July – 6 August 2023	(Rwanda) Kigali	2	Senegal
FIBA Women's Olympic Pre-Qualifying Tournament – Americas	9–12 November 2023	(Colombia) Medellín	2	Canada
FIBA Women's Olympic Pre-Qualifying Tournament – Americas	9–12 November 2023	(Colombia) Medellín	2	Puerto Rico
Total			16	
