= Serbian Basketball Player of the Year =

Basketball award in Serbia

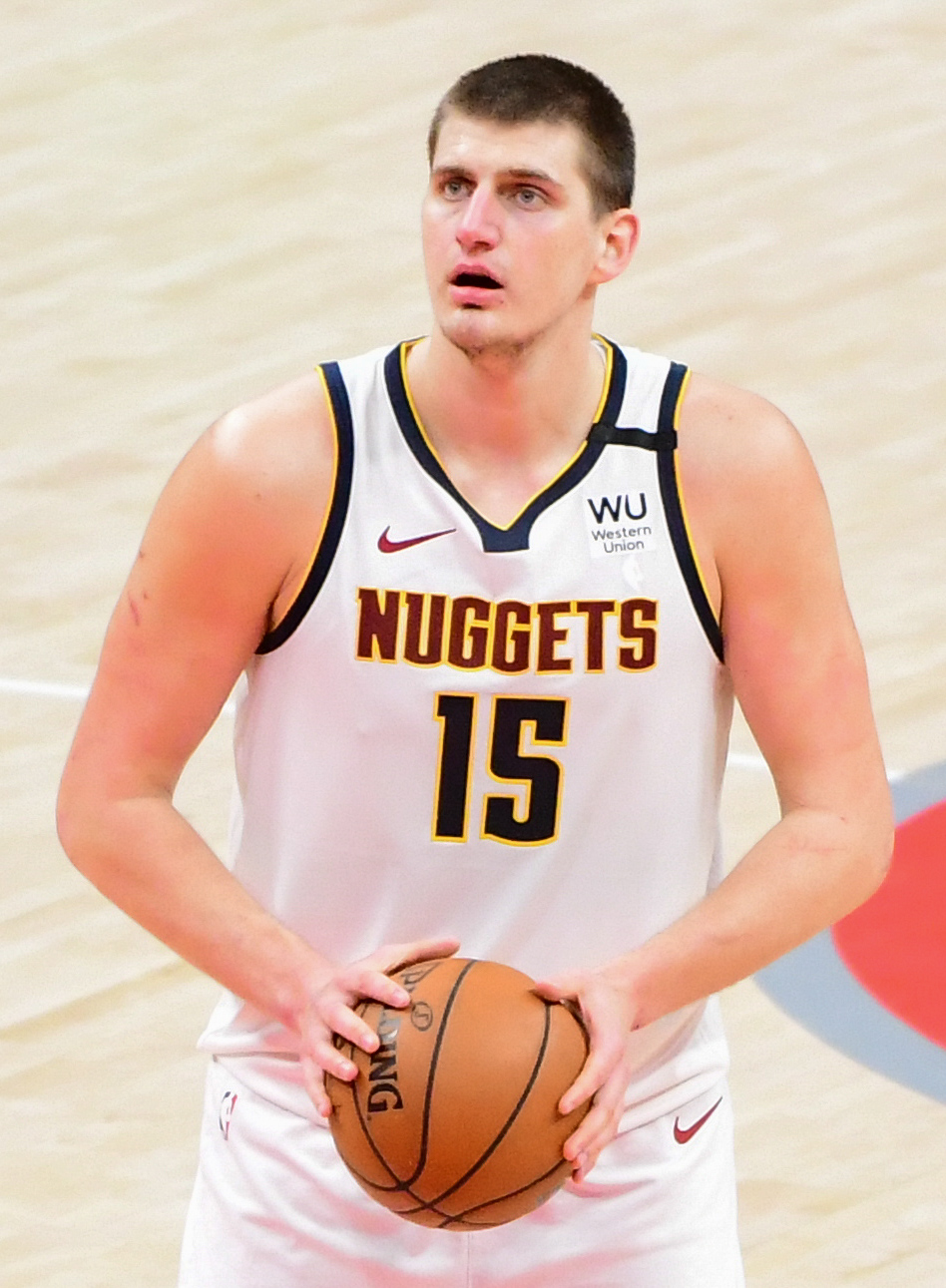
- Nikola Jokić has won the award a record five times.
- Sport: Basketball
- Awarded for: outstanding playing performance in a calendar year
- Location: Belgrade
- Country: Serbia
- Presented by: Basketball Federation of Serbia

History
- First award: 2015
- Editions: 10
- First winner: Nemanja Bjelica; Ana Dabović
- Most wins: 5 Nikola Jokić
- Most recent: Nikola Jokić; Jovana Nogić

The Serbian Basketball Player of the Year award is established in 2015 to recognize the best basketball player of the year from Serbia. The winners are men's and women's basketball players who have Serbian citizenship, and whose performances with its basketball club and/or national team throughout the year has reached the highest level of excellence. All players with Serbian citizenship, regardless of where they play in the world, qualify for the award. The inaugural recipients were Nemanja Bjelica and Ana Dabović. The winners are selected by the Basketball Federation of Serbia.

== All-time award winners ==
Year	Men		Women		Ref.
Year	Player	Club(s)	Player	Club(s)	Ref.
2015	Nemanja Bjelica	(Turkey) Fenerbahçe Ülker (United States) Minnesota Timberwolves	Ana Dabović	(Turkey) Ormanspor (United States) Los Angeles Sparks (Turkey) Yakın Doğu Üniversitesi	
2016	Miloš Teodosić	(Russia) CSKA Moscow	Sonja Petrović (Note: Petrović married in 2019 and changed her surname to Vasić.)	(Czech Republic) USK Praha (United States) Phoenix Mercury	
2017	Bogdan Bogdanović	(Turkey) Fenerbahçe (United States) Sacramento Kings	Jelena Milovanović (Note: Milovanović married in 2019 and changed her surname to Brooks.)	(Spain) Perfumerías Avenida (Hungary) UNIQA Sopron	
2018	Nikola Jokić	(United States) Denver Nuggets	Aleksandra Crvendakić	(Hungary) UNIQA Sopron	
2019	Bogdan Bogdanović	(United States) Sacramento Kings	Sonja Petrović	(Russia) Dynamo Kursk (Spain) Spar CityLift Girona	
2020	No award	—	No award	—	
2021	Nikola Jokić	(United States) Denver Nuggets	Sonja Vasić	(Spain) Spar CityLift Girona (Note: In August 2021, Vasić retired from her basketball career at age 32.)	
2022	Nikola Jokić	(United States) Denver Nuggets	Tina Krajišnik	(Turkey) Galatasaray (United States) Chicago Sky (Russia) UMMC Ekaterinburg	
2023	Bogdan Bogdanović	(United States) Atlanta Hawks	Aleksandra Crvendakić	(France) ASVEL Féminin	
2024	Nikola Jokić	(United States) Denver Nuggets	Jovana Nogić	(Russia) UMMC Ekaterinburg	
2025	Nikola Jokić	(United States) Denver Nuggets	Jovana Nogić	(Russia) UMMC Ekaterinburg	

== Multiple winners ==
Number	Players	Pos.	First	Last
5	Nikola Jokić	C	2018	2025
3	Sonja Vasić (née Petrović)	SF	2016	2021
3	Bogdan Bogdanović	SG	2017	2023
2	Aleksandra Crvendakić	PF	2018	2023
2	Jovana Nogić	SF	2024	2025

== Special award winners ==
- 3×3 Player of the Year: Dušan Domović Bulut (2019)
- 2021 Greatest Achievements: Men's national 3x3 team and Women's national team
- 2023 Greatest Achievements: Men's national 3x3 team, Men's national under-18 team, and Dragan Radovanović

== See also ==
- Serbian Footballer of the Year
- Serbian Sportspersonality of the Year
- Awards of Olympic Committee of Serbia
- Slobodan Piva Ivković Award for Lifetime Achievement
