= EuroBasket Women 2023 =

יורובאסקט נשים 2023 Evropsko prvenstvo v košarki za ženske 2023

Tournament details
- Host country: Slovenia; Israel
- Dates: 15–25 June
- Teams: 16 (from 1 confederation)
- Venues: 2 (in 2 host cities)

Final positions
- Champions: Belgium (1st title)
- Runners-up: Spain
- Third place: France
- Fourth place: Hungary

Tournament statistics
- Games played: 39
- Attendance: 22,112 (567 per game)
- MVP: (Belgium) Emma Meesseman
- Top scorer: (Belgium) Emma Meesseman (21.7 ppg)

Official website
- Official website

The 2023 European Women Basketball Championship, commonly called EuroBasket Women 2023, was the 39th edition of the continental tournament in women's basketball, sanctioned by FIBA Europe. It was co-hosted by Ljubljana, Slovenia and Tel Aviv, Israel from 15 to 25 June 2023.

Serbia was the defending champions. Belgium won their first title, winning 58–64 in the final over Spain, while France won the bronze medal, after defeating Hungary.

== Bidding process ==
The bids were as follows:

- Slovenia (Group phase and Final phase)
- Israel (Group phase)
- Austria (Group phase)
- Greece (Withdrew)

On 11 June 2021, Slovenia and Israel won joint hosting rights.

== Qualification ==
=== Qualified teams ===
Country	Qualified as	Date of qualification	Last appearance	Best placement in tournament	WR
Slovenia	Host nation	11 June 2021	2021	Tenth place (2019, 2021)	19
Israel	Host nation	11 June 2021	2011	Eighth place (1991)	54
Latvia	Group J winner	27 November 2022	2019	Fourth place (2007)	24
Spain	Group C winner	27 November 2022	2021	Champions (1993, 2013, 2017, 2019)	4
Italy	Group H winner	27 November 2022	2021	Champions (1938)	16
Belgium	Group A winner	9 February 2023	2021	Third place (2017, 2021)	7
France	Group B winner	9 February 2023	2021	Champions (2001, 2009)	6
Montenegro	Group F winner	9 February 2023	2021	Sixth place (2011)	20
Serbia	Group E winner	9 February 2023	2021	Champions (2015, 2021)	8
Turkey	Group D winner	9 February 2023	2021	Runners-up (2011)	11
Greece	Group G winner	9 February 2023	2021	Fourth place (2017)	17
Hungary	One of four best second-ranked teams	12 February 2023	2019	Runners-up (1950, 1956)	27
Great Britain	One of four best second-ranked teams	12 February 2023	2019	Fourth place (2019)	21
Czech Republic	Group I winner	12 February 2023	2021	Champions (2005)	22
Slovakia	One of four best second-ranked teams	12 February 2023	2021	Runners-up (1997)	23
Germany	One of four best second-ranked teams	12 February 2023	2011	Third place (1997)	37

== Venues ==
The tournament was initially planned to be played at four venues in four cities. Three venues would have been used for Slovenia and one for Israel. The preliminary matches were scheduled to be held in Tel Aviv, Celje and Koper. The final round will be played in the Slovenian capital Ljubljana. In June 2022, it was announced that Ljubljana will host all games played in Slovenia.

Ljubljana	Tel Aviv	EuroBasket Women 2023 is located in Europe
Arena Stožice; Capacity: 12,480	Drive in Arena; Capacity: 3,504	EuroBasket Women 2023 is located in Europe

== Draw ==
The draw took place on 8 March 2023 in Ljubljana, Slovenia where teams were drawn into four groups of four teams. Teams were seeded according to the FIBA World Rankings.

=== Seedings ===
The seeding was confirmed on 6 March 2023. Hosts Slovenia and Israel will each be drawn into a group playing on home soil. Furthermore, before the draw, Slovenia chose to be paired with Serbia, although they would play in different groups, while Israel paired with the Czech Republic and agreed to play in the same group.

Pot 1	Pot 2	Pot 3	Pot 4
Spain; France; Belgium; Serbia	Turkey; Italy; Greece; Slovenia	Great Britain; Montenegro; Slovakia; Czech Republic	Hungary; Latvia; Germany; Israel

== Squads ==
Each nation had to submit a list of 12 players.

== Preliminary round ==
All times are local.

=== Group A ===
Pos	Team	Pld	W	L	PF	PA	PD	Pts	Qualification
1	Spain	3	2	1	217	184	+33	5 (Note: Head to head result: Spain 78–57 Montenegro)	Quarterfinals
2	Montenegro	3	2	1	192	205	−13	5	Qualification for quarterfinals
3	Greece	3	1	2	202	215	−13	4 (Note: Head to head result: Greece 73–65 Latvia)	Qualification for quarterfinals
4	Latvia	3	1	2	190	197	−7	4	

Source: FIBA
Rules for classification: 1) Points; 2) Head-to-head results; 3) Points difference; 4) Points scored.
Notes:

15 June 2023
12:15

Boxscore

Montenegro	74–69	Greece
Scoring by quarter: 18–23, 23–11, 19–15, 14–20
Pts: Živković 15; Rebs: Živkovic 14; Asts: Mujović 5		Pts: Fasoula, Spanou 15; Rebs: Spanou 11; Asts: Spanou 6

Drive in Arena, Tel Aviv
Attendance: 100
Referees: Wojciech Liszka (POL), Ventsislav Velikov (BUL), Mihkel Männiste (EST)

15 June 2023
21:00

Boxscore

Latvia	67–63	Spain
Scoring by quarter: 17–15, 20–13, 18–19, 12–16
Pts: Šteinberga 22; Rebs: Jurjāne 9 Asts: Pulvere 7		Pts: Gil 20; Rebs: Gil 10; Asts: Cazorla 4

Drive in Arena, Tel Aviv
Attendance: 100
Referees: Gizella Györgyi (ROU), Marek Kúkelčík (SVK), Siniša Prpa (SRB)

16 June 2023
18:15

Boxscore

Greece	73–65	Latvia
Scoring by quarter: 13–17, 19–17, 24–13, 17–18
Pts: Fasoula, Spanou 22; Rebs: Christinaki 12; Asts: Spanou 4		Pts: Gulbe, Laksa 15; Rebs: Šteinberga 10; Asts: Strautmane 4

Drive in Arena, Tel Aviv
Attendance: 49
Referees: Maj Forsberg (DEN), Michał Proc (POL), Amel Dahra (FRA)

16 June 2023
20:45

Boxscore

Spain	78–57	Montenegro
Scoring by quarter: 19–14, 23–15, 10–22, 26–6
Pts: Conde 20; Rebs: Conde, Gil 6 Asts: Rodríguez 4		Pts: Leković 15; Rebs: Jovanović 7 Asts: Mujović 5

Drive in Arena, Tel Aviv
Attendance: 49
Referees: Paulo Marques (POR), Cecília Tóth (HUN), Marek Kúkelčík (SVK)

18 June 2023
12:15

Boxscore

Montenegro	61–58	Latvia
Scoring by quarter: 12–16, 12–14, 21–10, 16–18
Pts: Mack 22; Rebs: Mack 20; Asts: Mujović 5		Pts: Šteinberga 23; Rebs: Šteinberga 8 Asts: Pulvere 7

Drive in Arena, Tel Aviv
Attendance: 50
Referees: Maj Forsberg (DEN), Kerem Baki (TUR), Mihkel Männiste (EST)

18 June 2023
20:45

Boxscore

Spain	76–60	Greece
Scoring by quarter: 20–18, 15–9, 20–22, 21–11
Pts: Casas 16; Rebs: Carrera 8 Asts: Ouviña 6		Pts: Spanou 14; Rebs: Fasoula 8 Asts: Pavlopoulou 7

Drive in Arena, Tel Aviv
Attendance: 100
Referees: Viola Györgyi (ROU), Michał Proc (POL), Franko Gracin (CRO)

=== Group B ===
Pos	Team	Pld	W	L	PF	PA	PD	Pts	Qualification
1	Belgium	3	3	0	264	164	+100	6	Quarterfinals
2	Czech Republic	3	2	1	163	194	−31	5	Qualification for quarterfinals
3	Italy	3	1	2	210	201	+9	4	Qualification for quarterfinals
4	Israel (H)	3	0	3	179	257	−78	3	

Source: FIBA
Rules for classification: 1) Points; 2) Head-to-head results; 3) Points difference; 4) Points scored.
(H) Hosts

15 June 2023
15:00

Boxscore

Italy	58–61	Czech Republic
Scoring by quarter: 17–17, 16–15, 17–11, 8–18
Pts: three players 10; Rebs: André 8 Asts: Zandalasini 8		Pts: Hamzová, Holešinská 14; Rebs: Březinová 7 Asts: Andělová, Stoupalová 3

Drive in Arena, Tel Aviv
Attendance: 100
Referees: Maj Forsberg (DEN), Michał Proc (POL), Alexandre Deman (FRA)

15 June 2023
18:15

Boxscore

Belgium	108–59	Israel
Scoring by quarter: 28–18, 33–16, 24–9, 23–16
Pts: Meesseman 23; Rebs: Allemand, Meesseman 5 Asts: Allemand 8		Pts: Garzon 13; Rebs: Garzon, Raber 6 Asts: Karsh, Simms 3

Drive in Arena, Tel Aviv
Attendance: 1,378
Referees: Paulo Marques (POR), Kerem Baki (TUR), Blaž Zupančič (SLO)

16 June 2023
12:15

Boxscore

Czech Republic	41–84	Belgium
Scoring by quarter: 11–20, 15–19, 7–25, 8–20
Pts: Andělová 11; Rebs: Vyoralová 6 Asts: Stoupalová 3		Pts: Meesseman 24; Rebs: Meesseman 11; Asts: Allemand 11

Drive in Arena, Tel Aviv
Attendance: 144
Referees: Wojciech Liszka (POL), Mihkel Männiste (EST), Franko Gracin (CRO)

16 June 2023
15:30

Boxscore

Israel	68–88	Italy
Scoring by quarter: 18–30, 13–17, 14–20, 23–21
Pts: Cohen, Garzon 15; Rebs: Simms 6 Asts: Simms 4		Pts: Zandalasini 33; Rebs: Zandalasini 7 Asts: Keys 5

Drive in Arena, Tel Aviv
Attendance: 1,744
Referees: Viola Györgyi (ROU), Kerem Bakii (TUR), Sinem Tetik (TUR)

18 June 2023
15:15

Boxscore

Belgium	72–64	Italy
Scoring by quarter: 26–22, 17–17, 11–15, 18–10
Pts: Vanloo 23; Rebs: Meesseman 9 Asts: Allemand 11		Pts: André 17; Rebs: Zandalasini 7 Asts: Verona 6

Drive in Arena, Tel Aviv
Attendance: 124
Referees: Paulo Marques (POR), Cecília Tóth (HUN), Alexandre Deman (FRA)

18 June 2023
18:00

Boxscore

Czech Republic	61–52	Israel
Scoring by quarter: 19–11, 13–19, 14–12, 15–10
Pts: Voráčková 16; Rebs: Vyoralová 10; Asts: Hamzová 5		Pts: Raber 20; Rebs: Raber 9 Asts: Cohen, Rotberg 5

Drive in Arena, Tel Aviv
Attendance: 1,421
Referees: Wojciech Liszka (POL), Siniša Prpa (SRB), Blaž Zupančič (SLO)

=== Group C ===
Pos	Team	Pld	W	L	PF	PA	PD	Pts	Qualification
1	France	3	3	0	194	175	+19	6	Quarterfinals
2	Germany	3	2	1	178	181	−3	5	Qualification for quarterfinals
3	Great Britain	3	1	2	194	196	−2	4	Qualification for quarterfinals
4	Slovenia (H)	3	0	3	201	215	−14	3	

Source: FIBA
Rules for classification: 1) Points; 2) Head-to-head results; 3) Points difference; 4) Points scored.
(H) Hosts

15 June 2023
18:00

Boxscore

Great Britain	76–71	Slovenia
Scoring by quarter: 11–23, 22–15, 27–18, 16–15
Pts: Anigwe, Winterburn 15; Rebs: Anigwe 14; Asts: Winterburn 6		Pts: Oblak 25; Rebs: Sivka 11; Asts: Oblak 5

Arena Stožice, Ljubljana
Attendance: 2,150
Referees: Ariadna Chueca (ESP), Lorenzo Baldini (ITA), Ivor Matějek (CZE)

15 June 2023
20:45

Boxscore

Germany	50–58	France
Scoring by quarter: 16–11, 7–16, 15–16, 12–15
Pts: Sontag 10; Rebs: Gülich 8 Asts: Brunckhorst 3		Pts: Vukosavljević 11; Rebs: Gruda 8 Asts: Vukosavljević 4

Arena Stožice, Ljubljana
Attendance: 250
Referees: Luis Castillo (ESP), Mārtiņš Kozlovskis (LAT), Ofer Manheim (ISR)

16 June 2023
15:00

Boxscore

France	63–57	Great Britain
Scoring by quarter: 19–11, 10–13, 15–11, 19–22
Pts: Touré 15; Rebs: Gruda, Vukosavljević 5 Asts: Michel 7		Pts: Fagbenle 20; Rebs: Anigwe 11; Asts: Winterburn 4

Arena Stožice, Ljubljana
Attendance: 100
Referees: Lorenzo Baldini (ITA), Alexandra Stan (ROU), Martin Vulić (CRO)

16 June 2023
18:00

Boxscore

Slovenia	62–66	Germany
Scoring by quarter: 17–14, 13–18, 15–10, 17–24
Pts: Friškovec 20; Rebs: Oblak 5 Asts: Oblak, Sivka 6		Pts: Greinacher, Gülich 12; Rebs: Gülich 11; Asts: Brunckhorst 4

Arena Stožice, Ljubljana
Attendance: 1,645
Referees: Luis Castillo (ESP), Esperanza Mendoza (ESP), Gintaras Mačiulis (LTU)

18 June 2023
12:15

Boxscore

Germany	62–61	Great Britain
Scoring by quarter: 15–19, 14–19, 18–6, 15–17
Pts: Fiebich 13; Rebs: Fiebich 7 Asts: Fiebich 4		Pts: Fagbenle 18; Rebs: Anigwe 10; Asts: Fagbenle, Wallace 4

Arena Stožice, Ljubljana
Attendance: 289
Referees: Andris Aunkrogers (LAT), Lorenzo Baldini (ITA), Suzana Vujičić (MNE)

18 June 2023
18:00

Boxscore

Slovenia	68–73	France
Scoring by quarter: 14–15, 25–21, 12–18, 17–19
Pts: Lisec 16; Rebs: Lisec 11; Asts: Oblak 7		Pts: Michel 14; Rebs: Chartereau 7 Asts: Michel 5

Arena Stožice, Ljubljana
Attendance: 2,108
Referees: Ivor Matějek (CZE), Jelena Tomić (CRO), Andrada Csender (ROU)

=== Group D ===
Pos	Team	Pld	W	L	PF	PA	PD	Pts	Qualification
1	Hungary	3	2	1	238	211	+27	5 (Note: Head-to-head: Hungary 81–75 Serbia)	Quarterfinals
2	Serbia	3	2	1	236	196	+40	5	Qualification for quarterfinals
3	Slovakia	3	1	2	199	245	−46	4 (Note: Head-to-head: Turkey 66–80 Slovakia)	Qualification for quarterfinals
4	Turkey	3	1	2	198	219	−21	4	

Source: FIBA
Rules for classification: 1) Points; 2) Head-to-head results; 3) Points difference; 4) Points scored.
Notes:

15 June 2023
12:15

Boxscore

Slovakia	67–89	Hungary
Scoring by quarter: 12–16, 20–24, 21–15, 14–34
Pts: Dudášová 15; Rebs: Oroszová 8 Asts: Wrzesiński, Páleníková 3		Pts: Kiss 22; Rebs: Dubei, Goree 7 Asts: Kányási 5

Arena Stožice, Ljubljana
Attendance: 550
Referees: Martin Vulić (CRO), Geert Jacobs (BEL), Jelena Tomić (CRO)

15 June 2023
15:00

Boxscore

Turkey	63–71	Serbia
Scoring by quarter: 22–21, 11–16, 19–21, 11–13
Pts: McCowan 12; Rebs: Bayram 6 Asts: Uzun 6		Pts: Anderson 17; Rebs: Čađo 8 Asts: Anderson 5

Arena Stožice, Ljubljana
Attendance: 285
Referees: Andris Aunkrogers (LAT), Georgios Poursanidis (GRE), Gintaras Mačiulis (LTU)

16 June 2023
12:15

Boxscore

Hungary	68–69	Turkey
Scoring by quarter: 18–13, 16–13, 17–16, 17–27
Pts: Lelik 18; Rebs: Dubei, Goree 9 Asts: Lelik 9		Pts: Uzun 15; Rebs: McCowan 15; Asts: Çakır 7

Arena Stožice, Ljubljana
Attendance: 304
Referees: Ariadna Chueca (ESP), Mārtiņš Kozlovskis (LAT), Suzana Vujičić (MNE)

16 June 2023
20:45

Boxscore

Serbia	90–52	Slovakia
Scoring by quarter: 30–12, 17–19, 18–4, 25–17
Pts: Raca 16; Rebs: Stanković 11; Asts: Anderson, Krajišnik 4		Pts: Páleníková 10; Rebs: Moravčíková 9 Asts: Páleníková 3

Arena Stožice, Ljubljana
Attendance: 350
Referees: Andris Aunkrogers (LAT), Andrada Csender (ROU), Geert Jacobs (BEL)

18 June 2023
15:00

Boxscore

Hungary	81–75	Serbia
Scoring by quarter: 23–23, 16–21, 27–11, 15–20
Pts: Kiss 21; Rebs: Kiss 11; Asts: Studer 5		Pts: Anderson 18; Rebs: Crvendakić, Topuzović 8 Asts: Crvendakić 5

Arena Stožice, Ljubljana
Attendance: 640
Referees: Luis Castillo (ESP), Esperanza Mendoza (ESP), Georgios Poursanidis (GRE)

18 June 2023
20:45

Boxscore

Turkey	66–80	Slovakia
Scoring by quarter: 15–21, 16–19, 14–18, 21–22
Pts: McCowan, Uzun 16; Rebs: McCowan 6 Asts: Uzun 5		Pts: Páleníková 20; Rebs: Dudášová, Oroszová 6 Asts: Wrzesiński 7

Arena Stožice, Ljubljana
Attendance: 275
Referees: Mārtiņš Kozlovskis (LAT), Martin Vulić (CRO), Ofer Manheim (ISR)

== Knockout stage ==
=== Bracket ===
Qualification for quarterfinals
20 June
Germany	79
Slovakia	69
19 June
Czechia	79
Greece	76
20 June
Serbia	66
Great Britain	60
19 June
Montenegro	63
Italy	49

Quarterfinals
22 June
Spain	67
Germany	42
22 June
Hungary	62
Czechia	61
22 June
Belgium	93
Serbia	53
22 June
France	89
Montenegro	46

Semifinals
24 June
Spain	69
Hungary	60
24 June
Belgium	67
France	63

Final
25 June
Spain	58
Belgium	64
Third place game
25 June
Hungary	68
France	82

Classification games to Olympic Qualifying Tournaments

Class. game to WWCQTs
24 June
Germany (OT)	71
Czech Republic	69
24 June
Serbia	63
Montenegro	58

Fifth place game
25 June
Germany	62
Serbia	78

=== Qualification for quarterfinals ===
19 June 2023
18:00

Boxscore

Czech Republic	79–76	Greece
Scoring by quarter: 22–22, 19–20, 20–19, 18–15
Pts: Holešinská 19; Rebs: Hamzová 6 Asts: Holešinská 8		Pts: Fasoula 26; Rebs: Fasoula 13; Asts: Pavlopoulou 9

Drive in Arena, Tel Aviv
Attendance: 100
Referees: Maj Forsberg (DEN), Paulo Marques (POR), Mihkel Männiste (EST)

19 June 2023
21:00

Boxscore

Montenegro	63–49	Italy
Scoring by quarter: 22–8, 13–14, 13–9, 15–18
Pts: Jovanović 17; Rebs: Mack 15; Asts: Mujović, Živković 3		Pts: André 10; Rebs: Santucci 8 Asts: Santucci 4

Drive in Arena, Tel Aviv
Attendance: 100
Referees: Wojciech Liszka (POL), Gizella Györgyi (ROU), Kerem Baki (TUR)

20 June 2023
18:00

Boxscore

Germany	79–69	Slovakia
Scoring by quarter: 21–19, 23–17, 17–12, 18–21
Pts: Gülich 26; Rebs: Gülich 9 Asts: Fiebich 5		Pts: Wrzesiński 18; Rebs: Jakubcová, Moravčíková 6 Asts: Stašová 8

Arena Stožice, Ljubljana
Attendance: 179
Referees: Mārtiņš Kozlovskis (LAT), Andris Aunkrogers (LAT), Martin Vulić (CRO)

20 June 2023
21:00

Boxscore

Serbia	66–60	Great Britain
Scoring by quarter: 13–10, 16–18, 16–14, 21–18
Pts: Nogić 16; Rebs: Krajišnik 8 Asts: Anderson 3		Pts: Fagbenle 20; Rebs: Anigwe 14; Asts: Winterburn 6

Arena Stožice, Ljubljana
Attendance: 345
Referees: Ariadna Chueca (ESP), Luis Castillo (ESP), Gintaras Mačiulis (LTU)

=== Quarterfinals ===
22 June 2023
12:15

Boxscore

Hungary	62–61	Czech Republic
Scoring by quarter: 7–11, 22–11, 19–17, 14–22
Pts: Goree 17; Rebs: Dubei 11; Asts: Studer 7		Pts: Stoupalová 20; Rebs: Čechová, Stoupalová 6 Asts: Zeithammerová 4

Arena Stožice, Ljubljana
Attendance: 437
Referees: Mārtiņš Kozlovskis (LAT), Paulo Marques (POR), Gintaras Mačiulis (LTU)

22 June 2023
15:00

Boxscore

Belgium	93–53	Serbia
Scoring by quarter: 28–8, 21–23, 22–14, 22–8
Pts: Allemand, Meesseman 15; Rebs: Meesseman 13; Asts: Allemand 11		Pts: Anderson 20; Rebs: Anderson 6 Asts: Katanić 3

Arena Stožice, Ljubljana
Attendance: 595
Referees: Maj Forsberg (DEN), Wojciech Liszka (POL), Andris Aunkrogers (LAT)

22 June 2023
18:00

Boxscore

France	89–46	Montenegro
Scoring by quarter: 23–9, 21–17, 21–11, 24–9
Pts: Badiane 20; Rebs: Badiane 7 Asts: Fauthoux 6		Pts: Kovačević 9 Rebs: Mack 8 Asts: Mujović, Vučetić 3

Arena Stožice, Ljubljana
Attendance: 370
Referees: Luis Castillo (ESP), Lorenzo Baldini (ITA), Ivor Matějek (CZE)

22 June 2023
20:45

Boxscore

Spain	67–42	Germany
Scoring by quarter: 20–7, 13–9, 20–13, 14–13
Pts: Gil 13; Rebs: Gil 11; Asts: Cazorla 5		Pts: Greinacher 9 Rebs: Gülich 7 Asts: Brunckhorst 3

Arena Stožice, Ljubljana
Attendance: 250
Referees: Michał Proc (POL), Martin Vulić (CRO), Kerem Baki (TUR)

=== Classification games to Olympic Qualifying Tournaments ===
24 June 2023
12:00

Boxscore

Germany	71–69 (OT)	Czech Republic
Scoring by quarter: 18–15, 11–18, 13–16, 21–14, Overtime: 8–6
Pts: Fiebich 17; Rebs: Fiebich 16; Asts: Brunckhorst 7		Pts: Stoupalová, Zeithammerová 12; Rebs: Čechová, Stoupalová 6 Asts: Andělová, Čechová 4

Arena Stožice, Ljubljana
Attendance: 115
Referees: Andris Aunkrogers (LAT), Lorenzo Baldini (ITA), Amel Dahra (FRA)

24 June 2023
14:45

Boxscore

Serbia	63–58	Montenegro
Scoring by quarter: 19–16, 19–15, 15–12, 10–15
Pts: Anderson 23; Rebs: Krajišnik 7 Asts: Anderson 5		Pts: Mack 20; Rebs: Mack 13; Asts: Mujović 5

Arena Stožice, Ljubljana
Attendance: 181
Referees: Luis Castillo (ESP), Michał Proc (POL), Cecília Tóth (HUN)

=== Fifth place game ===
25 June 2023
14:15

Boxscore

Germany	62–78	Serbia
Scoring by quarter: 15–25, 19–22, 9–15, 19–16
Pts: Geiselsöder 14; Rebs: Geiselsöder 9 Asts: Brunckhorst, Gülich 4		Pts: Anderson 16; Rebs: Crvendakić 5 Asts: Anderson 6

Arena Stožice, Ljubljana
Attendance: 162
Referees: Cecília Tóth (HUN), Kerem Baki (TUR), Mihkel Männiste (EST)

=== Semifinals ===
24 June 2023
17:45

Boxscore

Spain	69–60	Hungary
Scoring by quarter: 18–14, 20–14, 12–18, 19–14
Pts: Torrens 27; Rebs: Gil 7 Asts: Cazorla 6		Pts: Studer 13; Rebs: three players 6 Asts: Studer 6

Arena Stožice, Ljubljana
Attendance: 1,221
Referees: Maj Forsberg (DEN), Jelena Tomić (CRO), Mihkel Männiste (EST)

24 June 2023
20:45

Boxscore

Belgium	67–63	France
Scoring by quarter: 18–8, 26–22, 10–16, 13–17
Pts: Meesseman 24; Rebs: Mununga 9 Asts: Meesseman 5		Pts: Gruda 17; Rebs: Badiane 8 Asts: Fauthoux 6

Arena Stožice, Ljubljana
Attendance: 1,151
Referees: Wojciech Liszka (POL), Kerem Baki (TUR), Martin Vulić (CRO)

=== Third place game ===
25 June 2023
17:00

Boxscore

Hungary	68–82	France
Scoring by quarter: 8–26, 22–23, 19–12, 19–21
Pts: Kiss 21; Rebs: Kiss 7 Asts: Goree, Studer 4		Pts: Touré 20; Rebs: Chartereau 6 Asts: Vukosavljević 5

Arena Stožice, Ljubljana
Attendance: 910
Referees: Luis Castillo (ESP), Andris Aunkrogers (LAT), Michał Proc (POL)

=== Final ===
25 June 2023
20:00

Boxscore

Spain	58–64	Belgium
Scoring by quarter: 17–13, 15–12, 16–18, 10–21
Pts: Casas 14; Rebs: Carrera 7 Asts: Gil 5		Pts: Meesseman 24; Rebs: Linskens 15; Asts: Allemand 8

Arena Stožice, Ljubljana
Attendance: 1,691
Referees: Maj Forsberg (DEN), Wojciech Liszka (POL), Lorenzo Baldini (ITA)

== Final standings ==
Qualified for the 2024 FIBA Women's Olympic Qualifying Tournaments

Rank	Team	Record
1st place, gold medalist(s)	Belgium	6–0
2nd place, silver medalist(s)	Spain	4–2
3rd place, bronze medalist(s)	France	5–1
4th	Hungary	3–3
Eliminated in the quarterfinals
5th	Serbia	5–2
6th	Germany	4–3
7th	Czech Republic	3–3
8th	Montenegro	3–3
Eliminated in the qualification for quarterfinals
9th	Italy	1–3
10th	Great Britain	1–3
11th	Greece	1–3
12th	Slovakia	1–3
Eliminated in the first round
13th	Latvia	1–2
14th	Turkey	1–2
15th	Slovenia	0–3
16th	Israel	0–3

FIBA Women's EuroBasket 2023 Champions

Belgium
1st title

Team roster: Emma Meesseman, Elise Ramette, Antonia Delaere, Laure Résimont, Kyara Linskens, Bethy Mununga, Serena-Lynn Geldof, Becky Massey, Maxuelle Lisowa-Mbaka, Billie Massey, Julie Vanloo, Julie Allemand
Head coach: Rachid Meziane

== Statistics and awards ==
=== Statistical leaders ===
==== Players ====
Points

Name	PPG
(Belgium) Emma Meesseman	21.7
(Greece) Mariella Fasoula	18.3
(Greece) Artemis Spanou	18.3
(United Kingdom) Temi Fagbenle	18.0
(Belgium) Julie Vanloo	16.2

Rebounds

Name	RPG
(United Kingdom) Kristine Anigwe	12.3
(Montenegro) Natasha Mack	11.0
(Greece) Mariella Fasoula	10.3
(Germany) Marie Gülich	8.9
(Belgium) Emma Meesseman	8.7

Assists

Name	APG
(Belgium) Julie Allemand	8.7
(Greece) Pinelopi Pavlopoulou	5.3
(Belgium) Emma Meesseman	5.2
(Greece) Artemis Spanou	4.5
(Hungary) Ágnes Studer	4.3
(Montenegro) Božica Mujović	4.3

Blocks

Name	BPG
(Belgium) Kyara Linskens	2.0
(Germany) Marie Gülich	1.7
(Montenegro) Natasha Mack	1.7
(Italy) Jasmine Keys	1.5
(Belgium) Emma Meesseman	1.3

Steals

Name	SPG
(Belgium) Emma Meesseman	4.3
(Serbia) Yvonne Anderson	2.7
(Slovakia) Barbora Wrzesiński	2.5
(Italy) Cecilia Zandalasini	2.3
(Italy) Mariella Santucci	2.0

Efficiency

Name	EFFPG
(Belgium) Emma Meesseman	29.8
(Montenegro) Natasha Mack	22.8
(United Kingdom) Temi Fagbenle	20.3
(Belgium) Kyara Linskens	19.3
(Greece) Artemis Spanou	19.0

==== Teams ====
Points

Team	PPG
Belgium	81.3
France	71.3
Hungary	71.3
Serbia	70.9
Greece	69.5

Rebounds

Team	RPG
Great Britain	43.5
Germany	41.0
Belgium	39.5
Greece	39.3
Hungary	39.2

Assists

Team	APG
Belgium	27.2
France	21.5
Hungary	19.7
Spain	18.5
Greece	18.0

Blocks

Team	BPG
Germany	4.7
Belgium	4.2
Czech Republic	3.0
Spain	2.7
Italy	2.5
Montenegro	2.5

Steals

Team	SPG
Belgium	11.5
Italy	11.5
Serbia	11.1
Spain	10.0
France	9.0

Efficiency

Team	EFFPG
Belgium	110.7
France	86.0
Spain	79.5
Greece	78.5
Hungary	78.2

=== Awards ===
The All-Tournament team and MVP award was announced on 25 June 2023.

All-Tournament Team
Guard	Forwards	Centers
(Belgium) Julie Allemand (Belgium) Julie Vanloo	(Belgium) Emma Meesseman (Spain) Alba Torrens	(France) Sandrine Gruda
MVP: (Belgium) Emma Meesseman
