= FIBA Women's Asia Cup All-Tournament Team =

The FIBA Women's Asia Cup All-Tournament Team is a FIBA award given every two years, awarded to the five strongest competitors throughout the tournament.

== Honourees ==
| Year | Player | Position | Team | Ref. |
|---|---|---|---|---|
| 2011 | Yuko Oga | Guard | Japan | |
| 2011 | Choi Youn-ah | Guard | South Korea | |
| 2011 | Miao Lijie | Forward | China | |
| 2011 | Sin Jung-ja | Center | South Korea | |
| 2011 | Chen Nan | Center | China | |
| 2013 | Asami Yoshida | Guard | Japan | |
| 2013 | Beon Yeon-ha | Guard | South Korea | |
| 2013 | Yuka Mamiya | Forward | Japan | |
| 2013 | Lu Wen | Forward | China | |
| 2013 | Ramu Tokashiki | Forward | Japan | |
| 2015 | Asami Yoshida (2) | Guard | Japan | |
| 2015 | Kim Dan-bi | Forward | South Korea | |
| 2015 | Shao Ting | Forward | China | |
| 2015 | Ramu Tokashiki (2) | Forward | Japan | |
| 2015 | Sun Mengran | Center | China | |
| 2017 | Manami Fujioka | Guard | Japan | |
| 2017 | Lim Yung-hui | Guard | South Korea | |
| 2017 | Moeko Nagaoka | Forward | Japan | |
| 2017 | Kelsey Griffin | Forward | Australia | |
| 2017 | Li Yueru | Center | China | |
| 2019 | Nako Motohashi | Guard | Japan | |
| 2019 | Shao Ting (2) | Guard | China | |
| 2019 | Yuki Miyazawa | Forward | Japan | |
| 2019 | Rebecca Allen | Forward | Australia | |
| 2019 | Han Xu | Center | China | |
| 2021 | Sami Whitcomb | Guard | Australia | |
| 2021 | Saori Miyazaki | Guard | Japan | |
| 2021 | Huang Sijing | Forward | China | |
| 2021 | Himawari Akaho | Forward | Japan | |
| 2021 | Li Yueru (2) | Center | China | |
| 2023 | Mai Yamamoto | Guard | Japan | |
| 2023 | Li Meng | Guard | China | |
| 2023 | Alice Kunek | Forward | Australia | |
| 2023 | Penina Davidson | Forward | New Zealand | |
| 2023 | Han Xu (2) | Center | China | |
| 2025 | Stephanie Reid | Guard | Australia | |
| 2025 | Park Ji-hyun | Guard | South Korea | |
| 2025 | Kokoro Tanaka | Guard | Japan | |
| 2025 | Alexandra Fowler | Forward | Australia | |
| 2025 | Han Xu (3) | Center | China | |

== See also ==
- FIBA Women's Asia Cup Most Valuable Player
- FIBA Women's Basketball World Cup Most Valuable Player
- FIBA Women's Basketball World Cup All-Tournament Team
- FIBA Awards
