= FIBA Awards =

Awards given at the end of FIBA basketball tournaments

- Awarded for: Recognition in the FIBA
- Presented by: FIBA
- First award: 3 November 1950; 76 years ago
- Website: www.fiba.com

FIBA Awards are basketball awards that are given at the end of each FIBA tournament, or that are given in recognition of an individual's contributions to the sport. There are several awards that are attributed to the players, which have distinguished themselves from the rest, in different aspects of the game.

== FIBA tournament awards ==
The FIBA tournament awards are awarded at the Men's and Women's Summer Olympic Games, the FIBA World Cup, and the FIBA Women's World Cup, as well as at each of the FIBA continental cups, at both the senior and youth levels.

- The Most Valuable Player (the most valuable player within the tournament).
- The All-Tournament Team (five players who distinguished themselves within the tournament, also commonly referred to as the All-Star Five).
- The All-Second Team
- The Best Defensive Player
- The Rising Star Award
- The Best Coach

== Current award winners ==
=== Summer Olympics ===
==== Most Valuable Player ====
| Tournament | Most Recent Awardee | Team | Year |
|---|---|---|---|
| Men | LeBron James | United States | 2024 |
| Women | A'ja Wilson | United States | 2024 |

==== Rising Star ====
| Tournament | Most Recent Awardee | Team | Year |
|---|---|---|---|
| Men | Victor Wembanyama | France | 2024 |
| Women | Jade Melbourne | Australia | 2024 |

==== Best Coach ====
| Tournament | Most Recent Awardee | Team | Year |
|---|---|---|---|
| Men | Vincent Collet | France | 2024 |
| Women | Rena Wakama | Nigeria | 2024 |

==== All-Tournament Team ====
| Tournament | Most Recent Awardee | Team | Year |
|---|---|---|---|
| Men | Dennis Schröder | Germany | 2024 |
| Men | Stephen Curry | United States | 2024 |
| Men | LeBron James | United States | 2024 |
| Men | Victor Wembanyama | France | 2024 |
| Men | Nikola Jokić | Serbia | 2024 |
| Women | Gabby Williams | France | 2024 |
| Women | Breanna Stewart | United States | 2024 |
| Women | Alanna Smith | Australia | 2024 |
| Women | Emma Meesseman | Belgium | 2024 |
| Women | A'ja Wilson | United States | 2024 |

==== All-Second Team ====
| Tournament | Most Recent Awardee | Team | Year |
|---|---|---|---|
| Men | Shai Gilgeous-Alexander | Canada | 2024 |
| Men | Bogdan Bogdanović | Serbia | 2024 |
| Men | Franz Wagner | Germany | 2024 |
| Men | Guerschon Yabusele | France | 2024 |
| Men | Giannis Antetokounmpo | Greece | 2024 |
| Women | Ezinne Kalu | Nigeria | 2024 |
| Women | Julie Vanloo | Belgium | 2024 |
| Women | Satou Sabally | Germany | 2024 |
| Women | Valériane Ayayi | France | 2024 |
| Women | Ezi Magbegor | Australia | 2024 |

=== World Cups ===
==== Most Valuable Player ====
| Tournament | Most Recent Awardee | Team | Year |
|---|---|---|---|
| Men | Dennis Schröder | Germany | 2023 |
| Women | Breanna Stewart | United States | 2026 |
| U-19 Men | AJ Dybantsa | United States | 2025 |
| U-19 Women | Saniyah Hall | United States | 2025 |
| U-17 Men | Joaquim Boumtje-Boumtje | United States | 2026 |
| U-17 Women | Ivanna Wilson Manyacka | United States | 2026 |

==== All-Tournament Team ====
| Tournament | Most Recent Awardee | Team | Year |
|---|---|---|---|
| Men | Dennis Schröder | Germany | 2023 |
| Men | Shai Gilgeous-Alexander | Canada | 2023 |
| Men | Anthony Edwards | United States | 2023 |
| Men | Bogdan Bogdanović | Serbia | 2023 |
| Men | Luka Dončić | Slovenia | 2023 |
| Women | Iyana Martín | Spain | 2026 |
| Women | Leonie Fiebich | Germany | 2026 |
| Women | Breanna Stewart | United States | 2026 |
| Women | Gabby Williams | France | 2026 |
| Women | Jackie Young | United States | 2026 |
| U-19 Men | Christian Anderson Jr. | Germany | 2025 |
| U-19 Men | Mikel Brown Jr. | United States | 2025 |
| U-19 Men | Žak Smrekar | Slovenia | 2025 |
| U-19 Men | AJ Dybantsa | United States | 2025 |
| U-19 Men | Hannes Steinbach | Germany | 2025 |
| U-19 Women | Bonnie Deas | Australia | 2025 |
| U-19 Women | Saniyah Hall | United States | 2025 |
| U-19 Women | Somtochukwu Okafor | Spain | 2025 |
| U-19 Women | Syla Swords | Canada | 2025 |
| U-19 Women | Sienna Betts | United States | 2025 |
| U-17 Men | Beckham Black | United States | 2026 |
| U-17 Men | Ömer Kutluay | Turkey | 2026 |
| U-17 Men | Luke Paul | Australia | 2026 |
| U-17 Men | Nikola Kusturica | Serbia | 2026 |
| U-17 Men | Joaquim Boumtje-Boumtje | United States | 2026 |
| U-17 Women | Isabel Hernández | Spain | 2026 |
| U-17 Women | Miya Takeuchi | Japan | 2026 |
| U-17 Women | Ivanna Wilson Manyacka | United States | 2026 |
| U-17 Women | Madison Ryan | Australia | 2026 |
| U-17 Women | Frances Vollett | Canada | 2026 |

==== All-Second Team ====
| Tournament | Most Recent Awardee | Team | Year |
|---|---|---|---|
| Men | Artūrs Žagars | Latvia | 2023 |
| Men | Simone Fontecchio | Italy | 2023 |
| Men | Jonas Valančiūnas | Lithuania | 2023 |
| Men | Nikola Milutinov | Serbia | 2023 |
| Men | Franz Wagner | Germany | 2023 |
| Women | Emma Meesseman | Belgium | 2026 |
| Women | Janelle Salaün | France | 2026 |
| Women | Nyara Sabally | Germany | 2026 |
| Women | Stephanie Talbot | Australia | 2026 |
| Women | Han Xu | China | 2026 |
| U-19 Men | Jordan Charles | Canada | 2025 |
| U-19 Men | Tama Isaac | New Zealand | 2025 |
| U-19 Men | Dayan Nessah | Switzerland | 2025 |
| U-19 Men | Roman Siulepa | Australia | 2025 |
| U-19 Men | Tyler Kropp | Argentina | 2025 |
| U-19 Women | Gal Raviv | Israel | 2025 |
| U-19 Women | Jazzy Davidson | United States | 2025 |
| U-19 Women | Nell Angloma | France | 2025 |
| U-19 Women | Avery Howell | Canada | 2025 |
| U-19 Women | Clara Silva | Portugal | 2025 |
| U-17 Men | Darius Karutasu | Turkey | 2026 |
| U-17 Men | DJ Gaines | Puerto Rico | 2026 |
| U-17 Men | Matija Lukić | Serbia | 2026 |
| U-17 Men | CJ Rosser | United States | 2026 |
| U-17 Men | Nathan Soliman | France | 2026 |
| U-17 Women | Olivia Olechnowicz | Australia | 2026 |
| U-17 Women | Anais Gobec | Slovenia | 2026 |
| U-17 Women | Micah Ojo | United States | 2026 |
| U-17 Women | Li Yuanshan | China | 2026 |
| U-17 Women | Amelia Alonso | Spain | 2026 |

==== Best Defensive Player ====
| Tournament | Most Recent Awardee | Team | Year |
|---|---|---|---|
| Men | Dillon Brooks | Canada | 2023 |
| Women | Gabby Williams | France | 2026 |
| U-19 Men | Jordan Smith Jr. | United States | 2025 |
| U-19 Women | Clara Silva | Portugal | 2025 |
| U-17 Men | Nikola Kusturica | Serbia | 2026 |
| U-17 Women | Olivia Olechnowicz | Australia | 2026 |

==== Rising Star Award ====
| Tournament | Most Recent Awardee | Team | Year |
|---|---|---|---|
| Men | Josh Giddey | Australia | 2023 |
| Women | Iyana Martín | Spain | 2026 |

==== Best Coach ====
| Tournament | Most Recent Awardee | Team | Year |
|---|---|---|---|
| Men | (Italy) Luca Banchi | Latvia | 2023 |
| Women | (Spain) Miguel Méndez | Spain | 2026 |
| U-19 Men | (Slovenia) Danijel Radosavljević | Slovenia | 2025 |
| U-19 Women | (Australia) Renae Camino | Australia | 2025 |
| U-17 Men | (Serbia) Stevan Mijovic | Serbia | 2026 |
| U-17 Women | (Spain) Isabel Fernández | Spain | 2026 |

=== Continental Cups ===
==== Most Valuable Player ====
| Tournament | Most Recent Awardee | Team | Year |
|---|---|---|---|
| AfroBasket Men | Childe Dundão | Angola | 2025 |
| AfroBasket Women | Amy Okonkwo | Nigeria | 2025 |
| AmeriCup Men | Yago dos Santos | Brazil | 2025 |
| AmeriCup Women | Mikayla Blakes | United States | 2025 |
| Asia Cup Men | Jaylin Galloway | Australia | 2025 |
| Asia Cup Women | Alexandra Fowler | Australia | 2025 |
| EuroBasket Men | Dennis Schröder | Germany | 2025 |
| EuroBasket Women | Emma Meesseman | Belgium | 2025 |

==== All-Tournament Team ====
| Tournament | Most Recent Awardee | Team | Year |
|---|---|---|---|
| AfroBasket Men | Childe Dundão | Angola | 2025 |
| AfroBasket Men | Brancou Badio | Senegal | 2025 |
| AfroBasket Men | Mahamane Coulibaly | Mali | 2025 |
| AfroBasket Men | Bruno Fernando | Angola | 2025 |
| AfroBasket Men | Aliou Diarra | Mali | 2025 |
| AfroBasket Women | Cierra Dillard | Senegal | 2025 |
| AfroBasket Women | Delicia Washington | South Sudan | 2025 |
| AfroBasket Women | Amy Okonkwo | Nigeria | 2025 |
| AfroBasket Women | Jane Asinde | Uganda | 2025 |
| AfroBasket Women | Sika Koné | Mali | 2025 |
| AmeriCup Men | Yago dos Santos | Brazil | 2025 |
| AmeriCup Men | Javonte Smart | United States | 2025 |
| AmeriCup Men | Kyshawn George | Canada | 2025 |
| AmeriCup Men | Bruno Caboclo | Brazil | 2025 |
| AmeriCup Men | Juan Fernández | Argentina | 2025 |
| AmeriCup Women | Mikayla Blakes | United States | 2025 |
| AmeriCup Women | Hannah Hidalgo | United States | 2025 |
| AmeriCup Women | Syla Swords | Canada | 2025 |
| AmeriCup Women | Damiris Dantas | Brazil | 2025 |
| AmeriCup Women | Kamilla Cardoso | Brazil | 2025 |
| Asia Cup Men | Sina Vahedi | Iran | 2025 |
| Asia Cup Men | Jaylin Galloway | Australia | 2025 |
| Asia Cup Men | Jack McVeigh | Australia | 2025 |
| Asia Cup Men | Wang Junjie | China | 2025 |
| Asia Cup Men | Hu Jinqiu | China | 2025 |
| Asia Cup Women | Stephanie Reid | Australia | 2025 |
| Asia Cup Women | Park Ji-hyun | South Korea | 2025 |
| Asia Cup Women | Kokoro Tanaka | Japan | 2025 |
| Asia Cup Women | Alexandra Fowler | Australia | 2025 |
| Asia Cup Women | Han Xu | China | 2025 |
| EuroBasket Men | Alperen Şengün | Turkey | 2025 |
| EuroBasket Men | Giannis Antetokounmpo | Greece | 2025 |
| EuroBasket Men | Dennis Schröder | Germany | 2025 |
| EuroBasket Men | Franz Wagner | Germany | 2025 |
| EuroBasket Men | Luka Dončić | Slovenia | 2025 |
| EuroBasket Women | Julie Allemand | Belgium | 2025 |
| EuroBasket Women | Raquel Carrera | Spain | 2025 |
| EuroBasket Women | Emma Meesseman | Belgium | 2025 |
| EuroBasket Women | Alba Torrens | Spain | 2025 |
| EuroBasket Women | Cecilia Zandalasini | Italy | 2025 |

==== All-Second Team ====
| Tournament | Most Recent Awardee | Team | Year |
|---|---|---|---|
| AmeriCup Men | Jose Alvarado | Puerto Rico | 2025 |
| AmeriCup Men | José Vildoza | Argentina | 2025 |
| AmeriCup Men | Georginho de Paula | Brazil | 2025 |
| AmeriCup Men | Norchad Omier | Nicaragua | 2025 |
| AmeriCup Men | Mfiondu Kabengele | Canada | 2025 |
| AmeriCup Women | Melisa Gretter | Argentina | 2025 |
| AmeriCup Women | Arella Guirantes | Puerto Rico | 2025 |
| AmeriCup Women | Bella Nascimento | Brazil | 2025 |
| AmeriCup Women | Olivia Miles | United States | 2025 |
| AmeriCup Women | Kayla Alexander | Canada | 2025 |
| EuroBasket Men | Cedi Osman | Turkey | 2025 |
| EuroBasket Men | Lauri Markkanen | Finland | 2025 |
| EuroBasket Men | Jordan Loyd | Poland | 2025 |
| EuroBasket Men | Deni Avdija | Israel | 2025 |
| EuroBasket Men | Nikola Jokić | Serbia | 2025 |
| EuroBasket Women | Julie Vanloo | Belgium | 2025 |
| EuroBasket Women | Sevgi Uzun | Turkey | 2025 |
| EuroBasket Women | Valériane Ayayi | France | 2025 |
| EuroBasket Women | Kyara Linskens | Belgium | 2025 |
| EuroBasket Women | Luisa Geiselsöder | Germany | 2025 |

==== Best Defensive Player ====
| Tournament | Most Recent Awardee | Team | Year |
|---|---|---|---|
| EuroBasket Women | Mariona Ortiz | Spain | 2025 |

==== Rising Star Award ====
| Tournament | Most Recent Awardee | Team | Year |
|---|---|---|---|
| AmeriCup Women | Gabriela Jaquez | Mexico | 2025 |
| EuroBasket Women | Justė Jocytė | Lithuania | 2025 |

==== Best Coach ====
| Tournament | Most Recent Awardee | Team | Year |
|---|---|---|---|
| EuroBasket Women | (Italy) Andrea Capobianco | Italy | 2025 |
