= List of WNBA annual free throw percentage leaders =

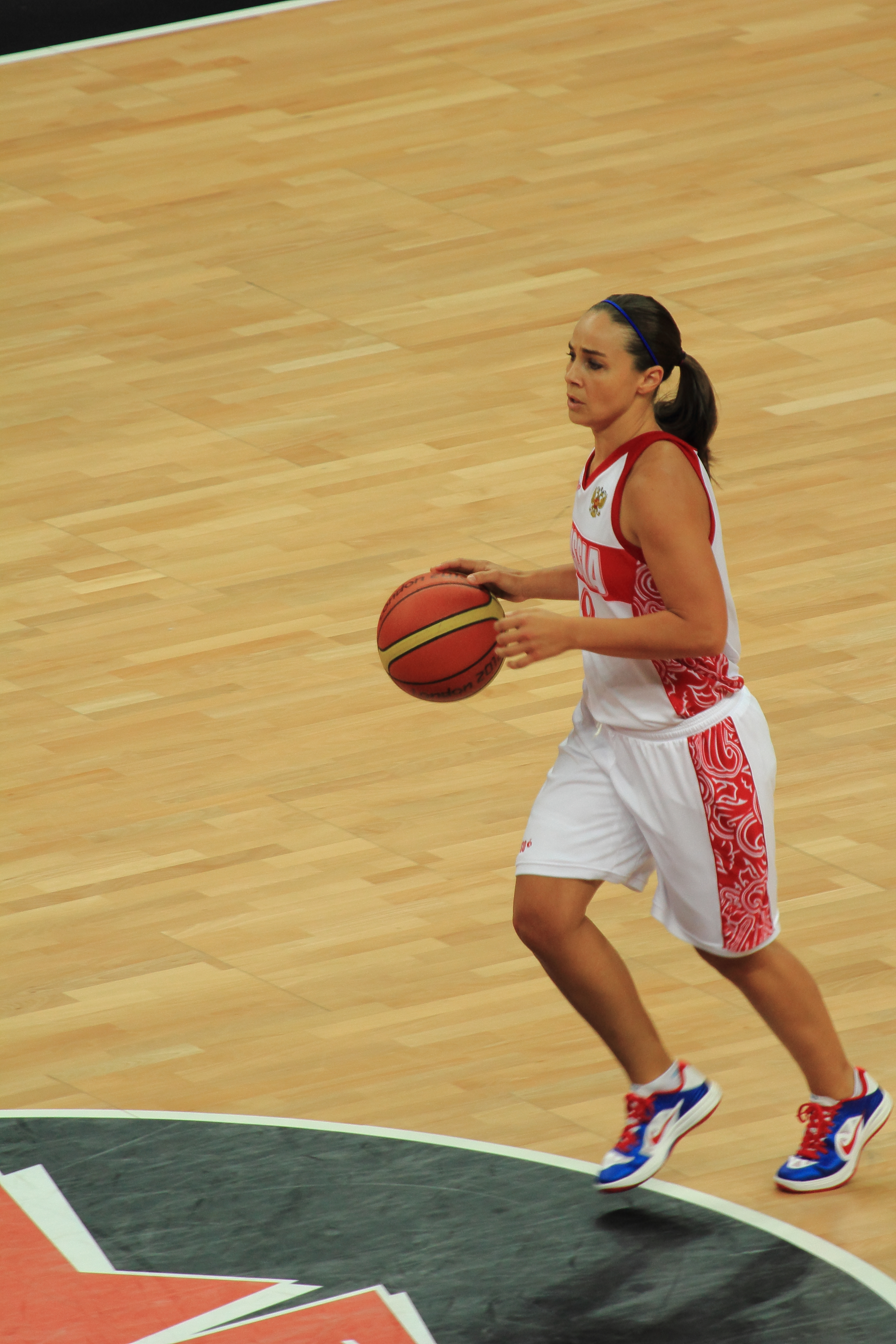
Becky Hammon has led the league in free throw percentage a record six seasons.

In basketball, a free throw is an unopposed attempt to score points from behind the free throw line. The Women's National Basketball Association's (WNBA) free throw percentage leader is the player with the highest free throw percentage in a given season.

Becky Hammon holds the record for best free throw percentage in a season, which she accomplished with the San Antonio Stars in the 2014 with 1.000%, missing 0 free throws that season.

Becky Hammon has led the league in free throw percentage a record six times. Elena Delle Donne has led the league four times. Nicole Powell and Allie Quigley each led the league two times. Becky Hammon in the 2005 season, 2006 season and Allie Quigley in the 2021 season, 2022 season are the only two players to have led the league in free throw percentage in consecutive years.

== Key ==
^		Denotes player who is still active in the WNBA			
*		Inducted into the Naismith Memorial Basketball Hall of Fame			
†		Not yet eligible for Hall of Fame consideration (Note: A player is not eligible for induction into the Naismith Memorial Basketball Hall of Fame until he has been fully retired for two calendar years.)			
Player (X)		Denotes the number of times the player had been the free throw percentage leader up to and including that season			
G	Guard	F	Forward	C	Center

== Annual leaders ==
Season	Player	Position (Note: The player's primary position is listed first.)	Team	Games played	Free throws made	Free throws attempted	Free throw %
1997	Bridget Pettis	G	Phoenix Mercury	28	97	108	.8982
1998	Sandy Brondello	SG	Detroit Shock	30	96	104	.9231
1999	Eva Horáková	F	Cleveland Rockers	31	62	63	.9841
2000	Jennifer Azzi	PG	Utah Starzz	15	40	43	.9302
2001	Elena Baranova	F	Miami Sol	32	66	71	.9296
2002	Sue Bird*	PG	Seattle Storm	32	102	112	.9107
2003	Becky Hammon*	PG	New York Liberty	11	39	41	.9512
2004	Crystal Robinson	F/G	New York Liberty	28	40	43	.9302
2005	Becky Hammon* (2)	PG	New York Liberty	34	118	131	.9008
2006	Becky Hammon* (3)	PG	New York Liberty	22	72	75	.9600
2007	Nicole Powell	F/G	Sacramento Monarchs	34	80	83	.9639
2008	Becky Hammon* (4)	PG	San Antonio Stars	33	163	174	.9368
2009	Nicole Powell (2)	F/G	Sacramento Monarchs	34	94	96	.9792
2010	Becky Hammon* (5)	PG	San Antonio Stars	32	97	101	.9604
2011	Marie Ferdinand-Harris	SG	Phoenix Mercury	34	38	39	.9744
2012	Kara Lawson	PG	Connecticut Sun	34	100	107	.9346
2013	Elena Delle Donne†	F/G	Chicago Sky	30	157	169	.9290
2014	Becky Hammon* (6)	PG	San Antonio Stars	32	35	35	1.0000
2015	Elena Delle Donne† (2)	F/G	Chicago Sky	31	207	218	.9495
2016	Sonja Vasić	SF	Phoenix Mercury	31	45	47	.9575
2017	Tianna Hawkins†	PF	Washington Mystics	33	41	43	.9535
2018	Diana Taurasi†	SG/PF	Phoenix Mercury	33	172	186	.9247
2019	Elena Delle Donne† (3)	F/G	Washington Mystics	31	114	117	.9744
2020	Tiffany Mitchell^	SG	Indiana Fever	19	77	81	.9506
2021	Allie Quigley†	PG/SG	Chicago Sky	26	47	49	.9592
2022	Allie Quigley† (2)	PG/SG	Chicago Sky	34	76	80	.9500
2023	Elena Delle Donne† (4)	F/G	Washington Mystics	23	75	80	.9375
2024	Arike Ogunbowale^	PG/SG	Dallas Wings	38	175	190	.9211
2025	Sabrina Ionescu^	PG	New York Liberty	38	152	163	.9325
2026	Ariel Atkins^	SG	Los Angeles Sparks	42	55	59	.9322

== Multiple-time leaders ==
Rank	Player	Team	Times leader	Years
1	Becky Hammon	New York Liberty (3) / San Antonio Stars (3)	6	2003, 2005, 2006, 2008, 2010, 2014
2	Elena Delle Donne	Chicago Sky (2) / Washington Mystics (2)	4	2013, 2015, 2019, 2023
3	Nicole Powell	Sacramento Monarchs	2	2007, 2009
3	Allie Quigley	Chicago Sky	2	2021, 2022

== See also ==
- List of Women's National Basketball Association career free throw percentage leaders
- List of National Basketball Association annual free throw percentage leaders
