= Sonja Vasić =

Serbian basketball player (born 1989)

Personal information
- Born: 18 February 1989 (age 37) Belgrade, SR Serbia, SFR Yugoslavia
- Listed height: 6 ft 3 in (1.91 m)
- Listed weight: 170 lb (77 kg)

Career information
- WNBA draft: 2009: 2nd round, 26th overall pick
- Drafted by: San Antonio Stars
- Playing career: 2005–2021
- Position: Small forward
- Number: 4, 5, 7

Career history
- 2005–2006: Crvena zvezda
- 2006–2007: UB-Barça
- 2007–2008: CJM Bourges
- 2008–2014: Spartak Moscow Region
- 2012: Chicago Sky
- 2014–2017: USK Praha
- 2016: Phoenix Mercury
- 2017–2019: Dynamo Kursk
- 2019–2021: Uni Girona

Career highlights
- EuroBasket Most Valuable Player (2021); 3× EuroLeague champion (2009, 2010, 2015); 3× Serbian Player of the Year (2016, 2019, 2021); Europe Young Player of the Year Award (2007)
- Stats at WNBA.com
- Stats at Basketball Reference
Medals
Women's basketball
Representing Serbia
Olympic Games
Bronze medal – third place	2016 Rio de Janeiro	Team
EuroBasket
Gold medal – first place	2015 Hungary/Romania
Gold medal – first place	2021 France/Spain
Bronze medal – third place	2019 Latvia/Serbia
Mediterranean Games
Silver medal – second place	2009 Pescara	Team
European U20 Championship
Bronze medal – third place	2008 Italy	Team
World U19 Championship
Bronze medal – third place	2007 Slovakia	Team
European U18 Championship
Gold medal – first place	2005 Hungary	Team
Silver medal – second place	2006 Spain	Team
Gold medal – first place	2007 Serbia	Team
European U16 Championship
Silver medal – second place	2004 Italy	Team

Sonja Vasić (née Petrović; Serbian Cyrillic: Соња Петровић Васић, born 18 February 1989) is a Serbian former professional women's basketball player. Standing at 1.89 m (6 ft 2 1/2 in), she played at the small forward position. She represented the Serbia women's national basketball team, and is a current member of the FIBA Central Board.

== Playing career ==
Before she came to the WNBA, she played for Crvena zvezda, UB-Barça, Tango Bourges Basket and Spartak Moscow Region.

== National team career ==
Vasić was a member of the Serbian national basketball team at the EuroBasket 2015 and at EuroBasket 2021 where they won the gold medal, they also qualified for the 2016 Olympics, first in the history for the Serbian team where they won bronze medal.

== Career statistics ==
Legend
GP	Games played	GS	Games started	MPG	Minutes per game	RPG	Rebounds per game
APG	Assists per game	SPG	Steals per game	BPG	Blocks per game	PPG	Points per game
TO	Turnovers per game	FG%	Field-goal percentage	3P%	3-point field-goal percentage	FT%	Free-throw percentage
**Bold**	Career best	°	League leader

=== WNBA ===
==== Regular season ====
WNBA regular season statistics
Year	Team	GP	GS	MPG	FG%	3P%	FT%	RPG	APG	SPG	BPG	TO	PPG
2009	Did not appear in league												
2010	Did not appear in league												
2011	Did not appear in league												
2012	Chicago	30	2	**15.1**	.358	.279	.769	**2.3**	**1.0**	0.5	**0.5**	1.3	4.8
2013	Did not play (waived)												
2014	Did not appear in league												
2015	Did not appear in league												
2016	Phoenix	**31**	**13**	14.8	**.421**	**.344**	**.957**	2.2	0.6	**0.6**	0.2	**1.0**	**5.1**
**Career**	2 years, 2 teams	61	15	15.0	.386	.301	.890	2.2	0.8	0.5	0.4	1.1	5.0

==== Playoffs ====
WNBA playoff statistics
Year	Team	GP	GS	MPG	FG%	3P%	FT%	RPG	APG	SPG	BPG	TO	PPG
2016	Phoenix	2	0	12.5	.444	.750	.000	1.0	2.5	0.5	0.0	0.5	5.5
**Career**	1 year, 1 team	2	0	12.5	.444	.750	.000	1.0	2.5	0.5	0.0	0.5	5.5

== Career achievements and awards ==
- EuroLeague champion: 3 (with Spartak Moscow Region: 2008–09, 2009–10; with USK Praha: 2014–15)
- FIBA Europe SuperCup Women winner: 2 (with Spartak Moscow Region: 2009; with USK Praha: 2015)
- Czech League champion: 3 (with USK Praha: 2014–15, 2015–16, 2016–17)
- French League champion: 1 (with CJM Bourges: 2007–08)
- French Cup winner: 1 (with CJM Bourges: 2007–08)
- Federation Tournament winner: 1 (with CJM Bourges: 2007–08)

Individual

- EuroBasket Most Valuable Player – 2021
- EuroBasket All-Tournament Team – 2015, 2019, 2021
- Serbian Player of the Year – 2016, 2019, 2021
- Europe Young Player of the Year Award – 2007

WNBA

- WNBA free throw percentage leader: (2016)

== Personal life ==
In July 2019, Petrović married Miloš Vasić, a Serbian rower.

== See also ==
- List of Serbian WNBA players
- List of flag bearers for Serbia at the Olympics

Olympic Games
Preceded by Ivana Maksimović	Flagbearer for Serbia (with Filip Filipović); Tokyo 2020	Succeeded by Dušan Mandić; Maja Ognjenović
