= Jovana Nogić =

Serbian basketball player (born 1997)

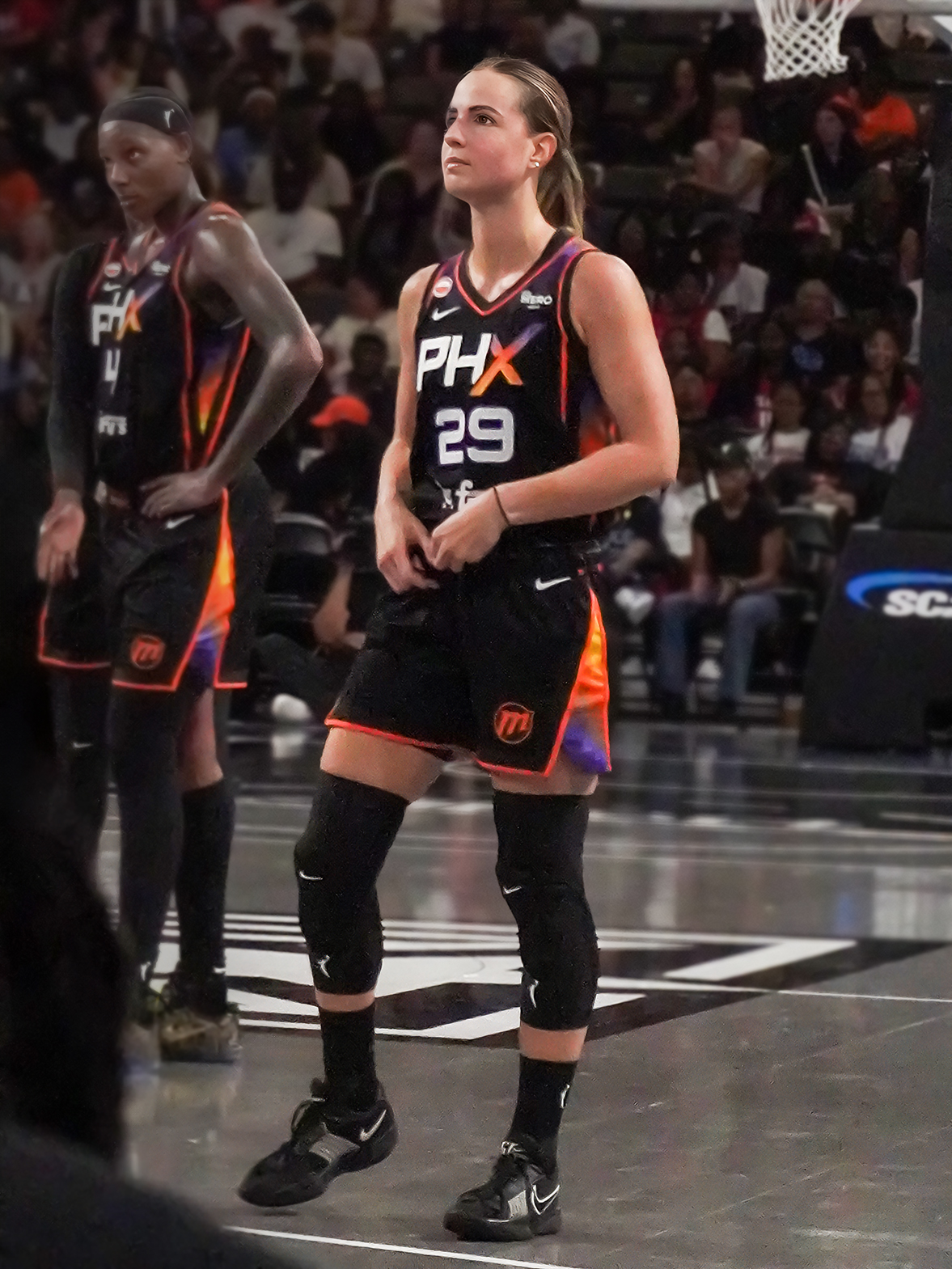
- Nogić with the Phoenix Mercury in 2026

No. 29 – Phoenix Mercury
- Position: Guard
- League: WNBA

Personal information
- Born: 17 December 1997 (age 28) Belgrade, Serbia, FR Yugoslavia
- Listed height: 6 ft 0 in (1.83 m)
- Listed weight: 170 lb (77 kg)

Career information
- College: Providence (2015–2019)
- Playing career: 2019–present

Career history
- 2019–2020: Cadi La Seu
- 2020–2021: Clarinos Tenerife
- 2021–2022: Campos Promete
- 2022–2023: CB Avienda
- 2023–2024: Beşiktaş JK
- 2024–present: UMMC Ekaterinburg
- 2026–present: Phoenix Mercury

Career highlights
- 2× Russian Premier League (2025, 2026); 2× Russian Super Cup (2024, 2025); 1× Russian Cup (2025); 2× Serbian Player of the Year (2024, 2025); 1× Russian Super Cup MVP (2025)
- Stats at WNBA.com
- Stats at Basketball Reference

Jovana Nogić (Serbian Cyrillic: Јована Ногић; born 17 December 1997) is a Serbian professional basketball player and member of Serbia national team. On club level she plays for the Phoenix Mercury of the Women's National Basketball Association (WNBA) and Russian club UMMC Ekaterinburg. She also holds Portuguese citizenship.

On April 13, 2026, Nogić signed a Rookie scale contract with the Phoenix Mercury. On June 20, 2026, Nogić was temporarily suspended by the Mercury. The next week, it was announced that she would miss the rest of the 2026 season.

== See also ==
- List of Serbian WNBA players
