= FIBA Asia Cup All-Tournament Team =

The FIBA Asia Cup All-Tournament Team is a FIBA award given every two years, awarded to the five strongest competitors throughout the tournament.

== Honourees ==
Year	Player	Position	Team	Ref.
2009	Rasheim Wright	Guard	Jordan	
2009	Samad Nikkhah Bahrami	Forward	Iran	
2009	Fadi El Khatib	Forward	Lebanon	
2009	Yi Jianlian	Forward	China	
2009	Hamed Haddadi	Center	Iran	
2011	Sam Daghles	Guard	Jordan	
2011	Takuya Kawamura	Guard	Japan	
2011	Samad Nikkhah Bahrami (2)	Forward	Iran	
2011	Yi Jianlian (2)	Forward	China	
2011	Hamed Haddadi (2)	Center	Iran	
2013	Jayson Castro	Guard	Philippines	
2013	Kim Min-goo	Guard	South Korea	
2013	Lin Chih-chieh	Guard	Chinese Taipei	
2013	Oshin Sahakian	Forward	Iran	
2013	Hamed Haddadi (3)	Center	Iran	
2015	Jayson Castro (2)	Guard	Philippines	
2015	Guo Ailun	Guard	China	
2015	Samad Nikkhah Bahrami (3)	Forward	Iran	
2015	Yi Jianlian (3)	Forward	China	
2015	Zhou Qi	Center	China	
2017	Shea Ili	Guard	New Zealand	
2017	Mohammad Jamshidi	Guard	Iran	
2017	Fadi El Khatib (2)	Forward	Lebanon	
2017	Oh Se-keun	Forward	South Korea	
2017	Hamed Haddadi (4)	Center	Iran	
2022	Wael Arakji	Guard	Lebanon	
2022	Mitch McCarron	Guard	Australia	
2022	Tohi Smith-Milner	Forward	New Zealand	
2022	Thon Maker	Forward	Australia	
2022	Zhou Qi (2)	Center	China	
2025	Sina Vahedi	Guard	Iran	
2025	Jaylin Galloway	Forward	Australia	
2025	Jack McVeigh	Forward	Australia	
2025	Wang Junjie	Forward	China	
2025	Hu Jinqiu	Center	China	

== See also ==
- FIBA Asia Cup Most Valuable Player
- FIBA Basketball World Cup Most Valuable Player
- FIBA Basketball World Cup All-Tournament Team
- FIBA Awards
