= Miloš Pavlović (basketball) =

Serbian basketball player

Personal information
- Born: April 12, 1984 (age 42) Belgrade, SR Serbia, SFR Yugoslavia
- Listed height: 2.11 m (6 ft 11 in)

Career information
- NBA draft: 2006: undrafted
- Playing career: 2001–2016
- Position: Power forward

Career history
- 2001–2002: BKK Radnički
- 2002–2003: FMP
- 2003–2005: Borac Čačak
- 2005–2006: Beovuk
- 2006–2007: Makedonikos B.C.
- 2007–2010: SC Kryvbas
- 2010: CSU Pitești
- 2010: CS Gaz Metan
- 2010–2011: OKK Beograd
- 2011: APOEL B.C.
- 2011–2012: Rabotnički
- 2012–2013: OKK Beograd
- 2013–2014: Swisslion Leotar Trebinje
- 2014: Entente Cergy Osny
- 2015–2016: ALS Basket Andrézieux
Medals
Men's basketball
Representing FR Yugoslavia
European Championship for Cadets
Gold medal – first place	1999 Slovenia	Team

Miloš Pavlović (born April 12, 1984) is a former Serbian professional basketball player.
