= 2002 FIBA World Championship for Women =

14th FIBA World Championship for Women

Tournament details
- Host country: China
- Dates: September 14–25
- Teams: 16 (from 5 federations)
- Venues: 9 (in 9 host cities)

Final positions
- Champions: United States (7th title)

Tournament statistics
- MVP: (United States) Lisa Leslie
- Top scorer: (Australia) Jackson (23.1)
- Top rebounds: (Russia) Baranova (11)
- Top assists: (Chinese Taipei) Chien (5.5)
- PPG (Team): (United States) (88.6)
- RPG (Team): (United States) (39.3)
- APG (Team): (Chinese Taipei) (14.4)

Official website
- 2002 FIBA World Championship for Women

The 2002 FIBA World Championship for Women (Chinese: 2002年国际篮联世界女子锦标赛; pinyin: 2002 Nián guójì lán lián shìjiè nǚzǐ jǐnbiāosài) was the 14th edition of the FIBA Women's World Championship. Hosted by China from September 14 to September 25, 2002, it was co-organised by the International Basketball Federation (FIBA) and the Chinese federation. The USA won the tournament, defeating Russia 79-74 for the gold medal.

== Venues ==
City	Venue
Wuzhong
Taicang
Zhangjiagang
Changshu
Suzhou	Suzhou Sports Center
Changzhou
Huai'an
Zhenjiang
Nanjing	Wutaishan Gymnasium

== Competing nations ==
Except China, which automatically qualified as the host, and the United States, which automatically qualified as the reigning Olympic champion, the 14 remaining countries qualified through their continents' qualifying tournaments:

Group A	Group B	Group C	Group D
Japan	Brazil	Lithuania	South Korea
Argentina	China	Chinese Taipei	Tunisia
Australia	Yugoslavia	United States	France
Spain	Senegal	Russia	Cuba

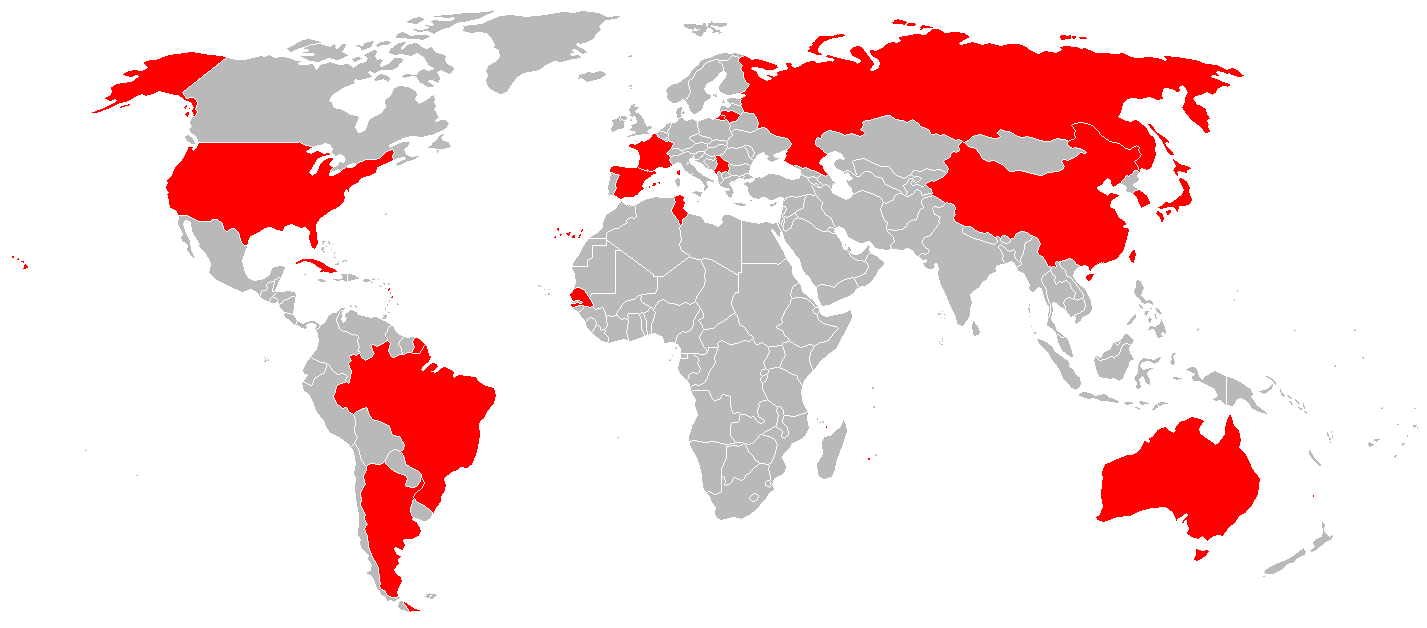
Teams qualified

== Preliminary round ==
=== Group A ===
Team	Pts.	W	L	PF	PA
Australia	6	3	0	256	164
Spain	5	2	1	255	191
Argentina	4	1	2	182	247
Japan	3	0	3	181	272

September 14, 2002

Japan	65–74	Argentina	Wuzhong
Australia	73–58	Spain	Wuzhong

September 15, 2002

Argentina	53–85	Australia	Wuzhong
Spain	100–63	Japan	Wuzhong

September 16, 2002

Australia	98–53	Japan
Argentina	55–97	Spain	Wuzhong

=== Group B ===
Team	Pts.	W	L	PF	PA
Brazil	6	3	0	264	200
China	5	2	1	226	213
Yugoslavia	4	1	2	234	224
Senegal	3	0	3	181	268

September 14, 2002

Brazil	85–73	China	Taicang
Yugoslavia	94–66	Senegal	Taicang

September 15, 2002

China	72–65	Yugoslavia	Taicang
Senegal	52–93	Brazil	Taicang

September 16, 2002

Senegal	63–81	China
Brazil	86–75	Yugoslavia	Taicang

=== Group C ===
Team	Pts.	W	L	PF	PA
United States	6	3	0	274	142
Russia	5	2	1	235	196
Lithuania	4	1	2	201	282
Chinese Taipei	3	0	3	165	255

September 14, 2002

Lithuania	92–80	Chinese Taipei	Zhangjiagang
United States	89–55	Russia	Zhangjiagang

September 15, 2002

Russia	97–61	Lithuania	Zhangjiagang
Chinese Taipei	39–80	United States	Zhangjiagang

September 16, 2002

Chinese Taipei	46–83	Russia
United States	105–48	Lithuania	Zhangjiagang

=== Group D ===
Team	Pts.	W	L	PF	PA
France	6	3	0	313	176
South Korea	5	2	1	282	231
Cuba	4	1	2	222	235
Tunisia	3	0	3	170	345

September 14, 2002

South Korea	124–70	Tunisia	Changshu
France	92–61	Cuba	Changshu

September 15, 2002

Cuba	71–78	South Korea	Changshu
Tunisia	35–131	France	Changshu

September 16, 2002

Tunisia	65–90	Cuba
France	90–80	South Korea	Changshu

== Eighth-final round ==
=== Group E ===
Team	Pts.	W	L	PF	PA
Brazil	11	5	1	492	176
Australia	11	5	1	524	231
China	10	4	2	472	235
Spain	10	4	2	473	345
Yugoslavia	8	2	4	466	235
Argentina	7	1	5	352	345

September 18, 2002

Yugoslavia	82–93	Australia	Suzhou
Brazil	85–39	Argentina	Suzhou
China	72–59	Spain

September 19, 2002

Argentina	76–83	Yugoslavia	Suzhou
Spain	78–68	Brazil	Suzhou
Australia	101–72	China

September 20, 2002

Yugoslavia	67–81	Spain
Brazil	75–74	Australia	Suzhou
China	102–55	Argentina

=== Group F ===
Team	Pts.	W	L	PF	PA
United States	12	6	0	553	307
Russia	11	5	1	482	368
France	10	4	2	511	414
South Korea	9	3	3	458	484
Lithuania	8	2	4	397	489
Cuba	7	1	5	392	466

September 18, 2002

South Korea	47–92	Russia	Changzhou
Cuba	44–87	United States	Changzhou
France	71–63	Lithuania

September 19, 2002

United States	91–53	South Korea	Changzhou
Lithuania	63–60	Cuba	Changzhou
Russia	74–59	France

September 20, 2002

South Korea	76–70	Lithuania
Cuba	66–81	Russia	Changzhou
France	68–101	United States

== Knockout stage ==
=== Championship bracket ===
Quarter-finals
September 23 - Nanjing
Brazil	70
South Korea	71
September 23 - Nanjing
China	70
Russia	86
September 23 - Nanjing
Spain	55
United States	94
September 23 - Nanjing
Australia	78
France	52

Semi-finals
September 24 - Nanjing
South Korea	53
Russia	70
September 24 - Nanjing
United States	71
Australia	56

Final
September 25 - Nanjing
Russia	74
United States	79
Third place
September 25 - Nanjing
South Korea	63
Australia	91

=== 5th through 8th place ===
Classification round
September 24 - Nanjing
China	81
Brazil	80
September 24 - Nanjing
France	59
Spain	69

Fifth place
September 25 - Nanjing
China	72
Spain	91
Seventh place
September 25 - Nanjing
Brazil	74
France	65

=== 9th through 12th place ===
Classification round
September 23 - Zhenjiang
Yugoslavia	74
Cuba	76
September 23 - Zhenjiang
Lithuania	65
Argentina	71

Ninth place
September 24 - Zhenjiang
Cuba	92
Argentina	71
Eleventh place
September 24 - Zhenjiang
Yugoslavia	62
Lithuania	83

=== 13th through 16th place ===
Classification round
September 19 - Huai'an
Japan	91
Senegal	89
September 19 - Huai'an
Chinese Taipei	107
Tunisia	70

Thirteenth place
September 20 - Huai'an
Japan	76
Chinese Taipei	61
Fifteenth place
September 20 - Huai'an
Senegal	87
Tunisia	52

== Awards ==
2002 FIBA Women's World Championship winner

United States
Seventh title

Most Valuable Player
(United States) Lisa Leslie

=== All-Tournament Team ===
- (United States) Shannon Johnson
- (Spain) Amaya Valdemoro
- (Russia) Elena Baranova
- (Australia) Lauren Jackson
- (United States) Lisa Leslie

== Final standings ==
Rank	Team	Record
1	United States	9–0
2	Russia	7–2
3	Australia	7–2
4	South Korea	4–5
5	Spain	6–3
6	China	5–4
7	Brazil	6–3
8	France	4–5
9	Cuba	3–5
10	Argentina	2–6
11	Lithuania	3–5
12	Yugoslavia	2–6
13	Japan	2–3
14	Chinese Taipei	1–4
15	Senegal	1–4
16	Tunisia	0–5
