= Alex Fowler =

Australian basketball player (born 2001)

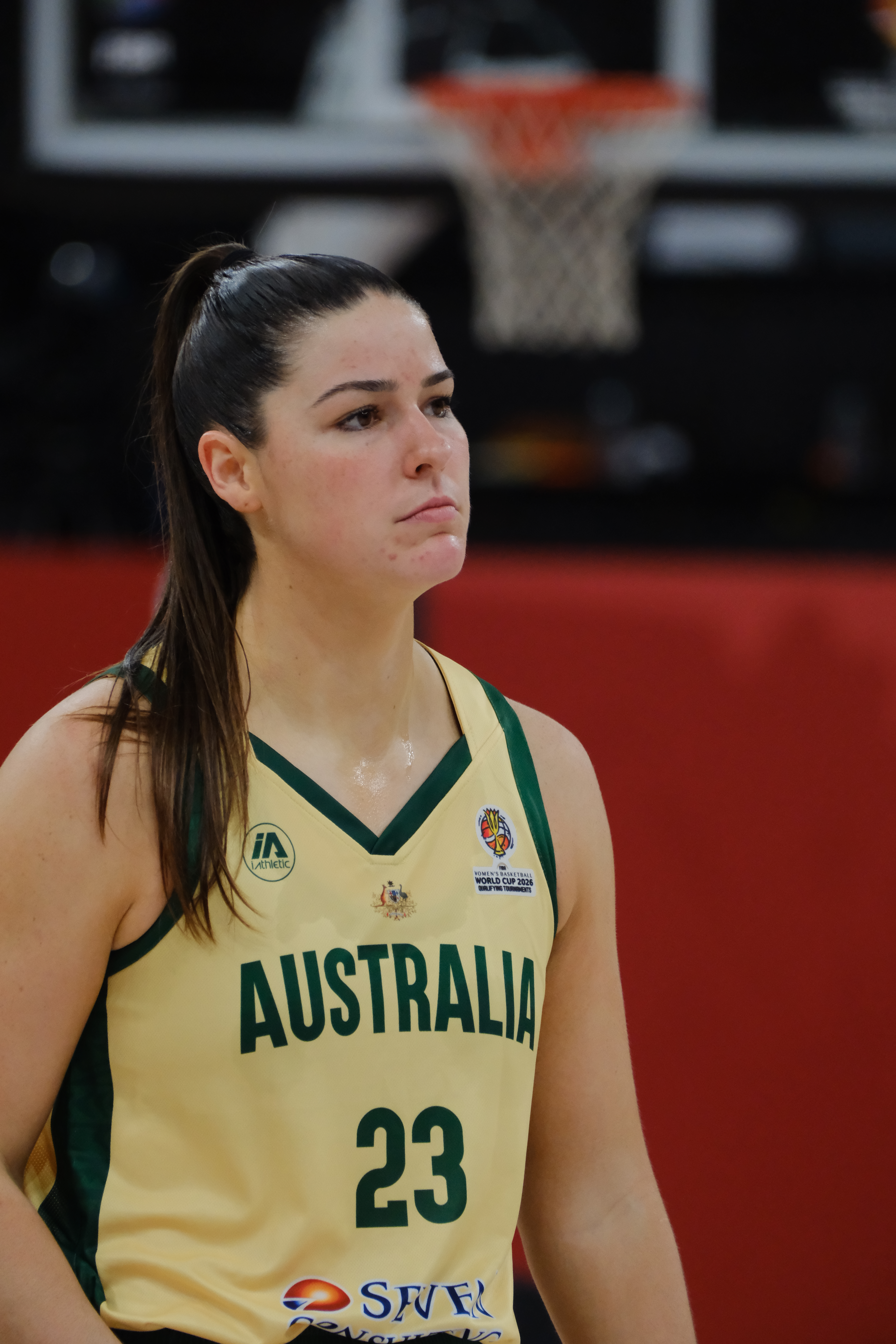
- Fowler in 2026

Personal information
- Born: 21 July 2001 (age 25) Townsville, Queensland, Australia
- Listed height: 6 ft 2 in (1.88 m)

Career information
- High school: St Margaret Mary's College
- College: Portland (2019–2023)
- Playing career: 2024–present
- Position: Forward

Career history
- 2023–2024: UC Capitals
- 2024–2026: Townsville Fire
- 2025: Perry Lakes Hawks
- 2026: New York Liberty

Career highlights
- WNBL champion (2026); 4× All-WCC First Team (2020–2023); WCC Newcomer of the Year (2020); WCC All-Freshman Team (2020)
- Stats at Basketball Reference
Medals
Women's basketball
Representing Australia
Asia Cup
Gold medal – first place	2025 China	Team
FIBA Under-19 World Cup
Silver medal – second place	2019 Thailand	Team
Women's 3x3 basketball
Representing Australia
Youth Olympic Games
Bronze medal – third place	2018 Argentina	Team

Alexandra Fowler (born 21 July 2001) is an Australian professional basketball player who most recently played for the New York Liberty of the Women's National Basketball Association (WNBA). She played college basketball at the University of Portland. She currently plays for the Townsville Fire of the Women's National Basketball League (WNBL) and won the WNBL championship in 2026.

== College career ==
Fowler played college basketball for four seasons at the University of Portland and finished her career as Portland's all-time leader at the Division I level in points (2,132), field goals made (832), field goal percentage (55 percent) and rebounds (882). She is the only player in program history to make four All-WCC First Teams, and led the West Coast Conference in scoring twice during her career while finishing top-five in the conference each season.

== Professional career ==
On 22 June 2023, Fowler signed with the UC Capitals of the WNBL. On 2 July 2024, she signed with the Townsville Fire. During the 2025 NBL1 season, she averaged 21.9 points, 8.1 rebounds, 2.8 assists and 1.5 steals in 15 games with the Perry Lakes Hawks. During the 2025–26 season, she averaged 10.8 points, 6.2 rebounds, 2.1 assists and 1.1 steals in 28 games, and won the WNBL Championship with the Fire.

On 14 May 2026, Fowler signed a developmental player contract with the New York Liberty of the WNBA. She made her WNBA debut later that night against the Portland Fire and recorded 12 points in 17 minutes. She became the first player in WNBA history to reach double figures in scoring while playing on a developmental player contract.

== National team career ==
Fowler represented Australia at the 2019 FIBA Under-19 Women's Basketball World Cup where she averaged a near tournament double-double of nine points and ten rebounds per game, while also leading her team in efficiency, and won a silver medal. She was subsequently named to the All-Tournament team.

Fowler represented Australia at the 2025 FIBA Women's Asia Cup where she averaged 11.8 points, 7.2 rebounds, 3.8 assists and 1.4 steals per game and won a gold medal. During the semifinals against South Korea, she posted a double-double of 11 points, 12 rebounds, four assists and five steals, to help Australia advance to the championship game. During the final against Japan, she recorded 15 points, six rebounds, two assists and one block. She was subsequently named to the All-Tournament team and tournament MVP.
