= FIBA Under-19 Women's Basketball World Cup All-Tournament Team =

Youth basketball award

The FIBA Under-19 Women's Basketball World Cup All-Tournament Team is a bi-annual award, that is given by FIBA, to the five best players of the FIBA Under-19 Women's Basketball World Cup.

== Honourees ==
Year	First Team			Second Team			Ref.
Year	Player	Position	Team	Player	Position	Team	Ref.
2005	Candice Wiggins	Guard	United States	not awarded			
2005	Renae Camino	Guard	Australia	not awarded			
2005	Liu Dan	Forward	China	not awarded			
2005	Jelena Dubljević	Forward	Serbia and Montenegro	not awarded			
2005	Crystal Langhorne	Center	United States	not awarded			
2009	Cristina Ouviña	Guard	Spain	not awarded			
2009	Marta Xargay	Guard	Spain	not awarded			
2009	Marina Solopova	Guard	Lithuania	not awarded			
2009	Nneka Ogwumike	Forward	United States	not awarded			
2009	Liz Cambage	Center	Australia	not awarded			
2011	Rui Machida	Guard	Japan	not awarded			
2011	Ariel Massengale	Guard	United States	not awarded			
2011	Damiris Dantas	Forward	Brazil	not awarded			
2011	Breanna Stewart	Forward	United States	not awarded			
2011	Astou Ndour	Center	Spain	not awarded			
2013	Olivia Époupa	Guard	France	not awarded			
2013	Jamie Weisner	Guard	Canada	not awarded			
2013	Stephanie Talbot	Forward	Australia	not awarded			
2013	Breanna Stewart (2)	Forward	United States	not awarded			
2013	Astou Ndour (2)	Center	Spain	not awarded			
2015	Daria Kolosovskaya	Forward	Russia	not awarded			
2015	Napheesa Collier	Forward	United States	not awarded			
2015	Alanna Smith	Forward	Australia	not awarded			
2015	A'ja Wilson	Forward	United States	not awarded			
2015	Maria Vadeeva	Center	Russia	not awarded			
2017	Tyasha Harris	Guard	United States	not awarded			
2017	Chennedy Carter	Guard	United States	not awarded			
2017	Raisa Musina	Forward	Russia	not awarded			
2017	Laeticia Amihere	Forward	Canada	not awarded			
2017	Maria Vadeeva (2)	Center	Russia	not awarded			
2019	Paige Bueckers	Guard	United States	not awarded			
2019	Rhyne Howard	Guard	United States	not awarded			
2019	Alexandra Fowler	Forward	Australia	not awarded			
2019	Maria Pendande	Center	Spain	not awarded			
2019	Billie Massey	Center	Belgium	not awarded			
2021	Júlia Boros	Guard	Hungary	not awarded			
2021	Jade Melbourne	Guard	Australia	not awarded			
2021	Caitlin Clark	Guard	United States	not awarded			
2021	Sonia Citron	Guard	United States	not awarded			
2021	Sika Koné	Forward	Mali	not awarded			
2023	Iyana Martín	Guard	Spain	Syla Swords	Guard	Canada	
2023	Hannah Hidalgo	Guard	United States	Maimouna Haidara	Forward	Mali	
2023	Leïla Lacan	Guard	France	Jana El-Alfy	Forward	Egypt	
2023	Joyce Edwards	Forward	United States	Dominika Paurová	Forward	Czech Republic	
2023	Toby Fournier	Forward	Canada	Awa Fam	Center	Spain	
2025	Saniyah Hall	Guard	United States	Gal Raviv	Guard	Israel	
2025	Bonnie Deas	Guard	Australia	Jazzy Davidson	Guard	United States	
2025	Somtochukwu Okafor	Guard	Spain	Nell Angloma	Guard	France	
2025	Syla Swords	Guard	Canada	Avery Howell	Forward	Canada	
2025	Sienna Betts	Forward	United States	Clara Silva	Center	Portugal	
