= Ana Dabović =

Serbian basketball player (born 1989)

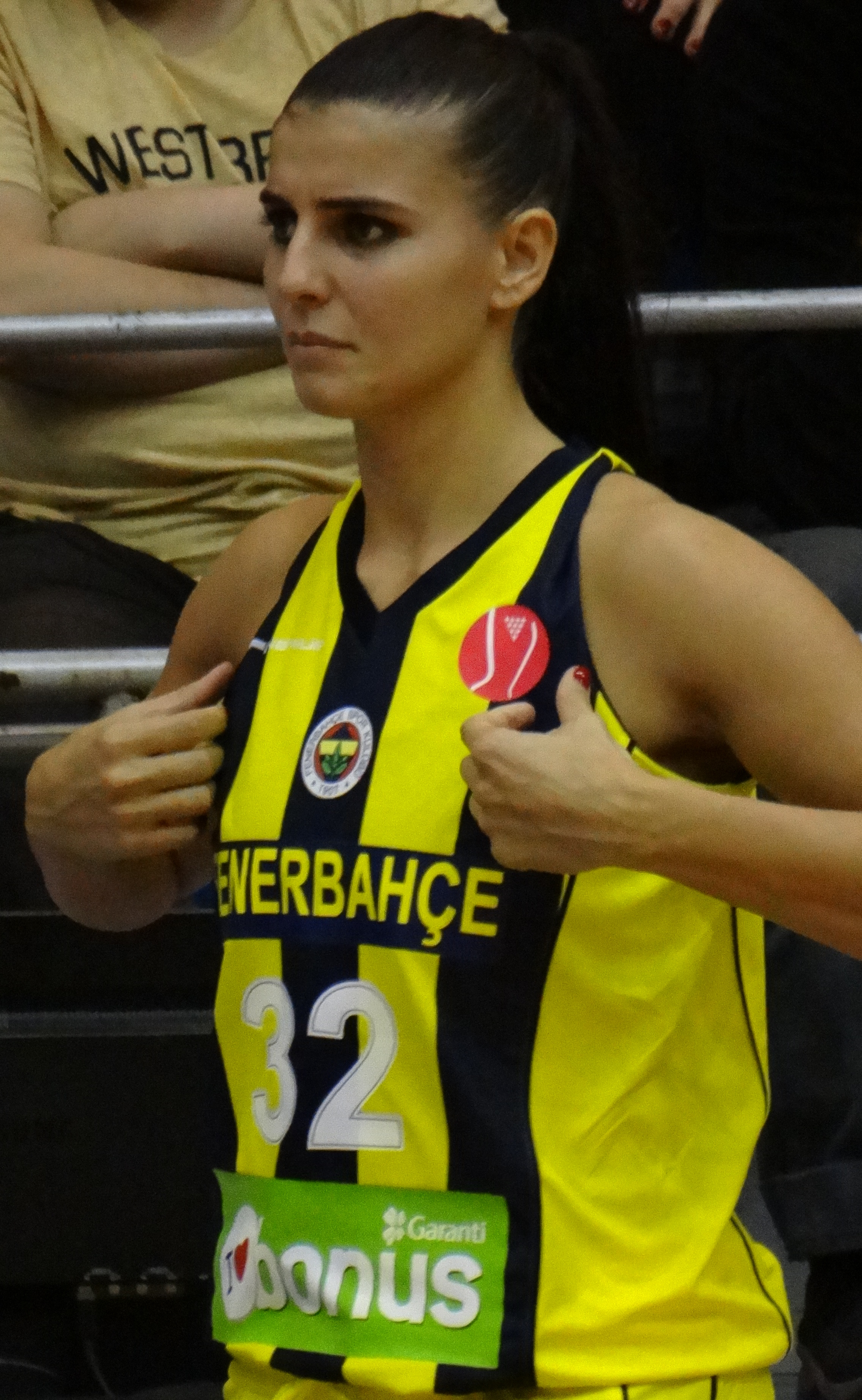
- Dabović in 2017

No. 23 – BLMA
- Position: Shooting guard
- League: Ligue Féminine de Basketball; EuroLeague

Personal information
- Born: August 18, 1989 (age 37) Herceg Novi, SR Montenegro, SFR Yugoslavia
- Listed height: 6 ft 0 in (1.83 m)
- Listed weight: 157 lb (71 kg)

Career information
- WNBA draft: 2011: undrafted
- Playing career: 2005–present

Career history
- 2005–2007: Herceg Novi
- 2007–2008: Flamurtari Vlorë
- 2008–2009: Herceg Novi
- 2009–2010: Aris Thessaloniki
- 2010–2011: Dynamo Novosibirsk
- 2011–2012: Wisla Can Pack
- 2012–2013: TED Ankara WBC
- 2013–2014: Dynamo Moscow
- 2014–2015: OGM Ormanspor
- 2015–2016: Los Angeles Sparks
- 2015–2016: Yakın Doğu Üniversitesi
- 2016–2017: Dynamo Moscow
- 2017–2018: Fenerbahçe Istanbul
- 2018: Los Angeles Sparks
- 2018–2019: BLMA
- 2019–2020: Tango Bourges Basket
- 2020–present: BLMA

Career highlights
- WNBA champion (2016); WNBA All-Rookie Team (2015); EuroCup winner (2014); EuroBasket MVP (2015); Serbian Player of the Year (2015)
- Stats at WNBA.com
- Stats at Basketball Reference
Medals
Women's basketball
Representing Serbia
Olympic Games
Bronze medal – third place	2016 Rio de Janeiro	Team
EuroBasket
Gold medal – first place	2015 Hungary/Romania
Gold medal – first place	2021 France/Spain
Bronze medal – third place	2019 Latvia/Serbia
Mediterranean Games
Silver medal – second place	2009 Pescara	Team
European U20 Championship
Bronze medal – third place	2008 Italy	Team
European U18 Championship
Silver medal – second place	2006 Spain	Team

Ana Dabović (Serbian Cyrillic: Ана Дабовић; born August 18, 1989) is a Serbian professional basketball player for the BLMA of the French Ligue 1 and EuroLeague Women. Standing at 1.83 m (6 ft 0 in), she plays at the shooting guard position. She also represents the Serbian national basketball team.

Since 17 April 2015 to October 2016, she was a president of ŽKK Vojvodina.

== Club career ==
Dabović began her professional career in WBC Herceg Novi, playing there from 2005 until 2007. She then signed with the Albanian team Flamurtari Vlore for the 2007–08 season, only to return a year later to Herceg Novi. In the following years she played for several foreign teams, including Greek WBC Aris, Russian WBC Dynamo Novosibirsk, Polish Wisła Kraków and Turkish TED Ankara Kolejliler.

In April 2013, she signed with Dynamo Moscow in the Russian Women's Basketball Premier League. She later played for Ormanspor in the Turkish Women's Basketball League. Dabović would play for Yakın Doğu Üniversitesi in 2015 of the Turkish Women's Basketball League. In 2016, Dabović once again played for Dynamo Moscow. In 2017, Dabović signed with Fenerbahçe.

== WNBA career ==
Dabović entered the 2009 WNBA draft but went undrafted. She would play the next 6 years overseas before being signed to a WNBA team. On February 18, 2015, Dabović signed a contract with the Los Angeles Sparks of the WNBA. On July 8, 2015, she made the WNBA debut for the Sparks, scoring 2 points in 8 minutes of action against the San Antonio Stars. Despite some limited minutes in the beginning of her stint with the Sparks, her role in the team increased over the time. Over 24 regular-season games, she averaged 8.8 points, 1.9 assists and 1.6 rebounds on 44.6% shooting from the field. For such performances, she was selected into the 2015 WNBA All-Rookie Team. In 2016, Dabović won her first WNBA championship with the Sparks as they defeated the Minnesota Lynx 3–2 in the finals.

On February 1, 2018, Dabović signed a contract to return to the Los Angeles Sparks for the 2018 WNBA season.

== International career ==
She represented Serbian national basketball team at the EuroBasket 2015 in Budapest where they won the gold medal, and qualified for the 2016 Olympics, first in the history for the Serbian team. On August 20, 2016, the Serbian team played for bronzed medal against France and won 70:63. This is the first medal Serbian women basketball team won in the Olympics.

== Personal life ==
=== Family ===
Her father is basketball coach Milan Dabović and her mother is Nevenka Dabović, former handball player. Ana has an older brother Milan, who is an active basketball player, and two older sisters, Jelica, a former basketball player, and Milica, a former basketball player.

=== Relationships ===
Since 2013, she was in a relationship with the former mayor of Belgrade and president of Basketball Federation of Serbia, Dragan Đilas. The couple separated at the end of 2014.

== WNBA statistics ==
Legend
GP	Games played	GS	Games started	MPG	Minutes per game	RPG	Rebounds per game
APG	Assists per game	SPG	Steals per game	BPG	Blocks per game	PPG	Points per game
TO	Turnovers per game	FG%	Field-goal percentage	3P%	3-point field-goal percentage	FT%	Free-throw percentage
**Bold**	Career best	°	League leader

†	Denotes seasons in which Dabović won a WNBA championship

=== Regular season ===
Year	Team	GP	GS	MPG	FG%	3P%	FT%	RPG	APG	SPG	BPG	TO	PPG
2015	Los Angeles	**24**	**8**	**22.1**	**.446**	**.333**	**.808**	**1.6**	**1.9**	**.8**	.0	1.5	**8.8**
2016^{†}	Los Angeles	22	0	10.7	.370	.158	.759	.8	1.3	.5	.0	**.8**	3.0
Career	2 years, 1 team	46	8	16.7	.427	.291	.790	1.2	1.6	.7	.0	1.2	6.0

=== Playoffs ===
Year	Team	GP	GS	MPG	FG%	3P%	FT%	RPG	APG	SPG	BPG	TO	PPG
2015	Los Angeles	3	0	**19.6**	**.500**	**.714**	.714	**1.7**	**3.7**	**.3**	.0	**.3**	**11.7**
2016^{†}	Los Angeles	**6**	0	8.0	.071	.143	**1.000**	.3	2.0	.1	.0	.6	0.8
Career	2 years, 1 team	9	0	11.9	.324	.429	.750	0.8	2.6	.2	.0	.6	4.4

== See also ==
- List of Serbian WNBA players

Sporting positions
Preceded by N / A	President of the ŽKK Vojvodina; 17 April 2015 – October 2016	Succeeded by N / A
