= FIBA Women's Basketball World Cup All-Tournament Team =

FIBA women's basketball world cup best team award

The FIBA Women's Basketball World Cup All-Tournament Team is an award, that is given by FIBA, to the five best players of the FIBA Women's Basketball World Cup.

== Honourees ==
*	Inducted into the Naismith Memorial Basketball Hall of Fame
**	Inducted into the FIBA Hall of Fame
***	Inducted into both the Naismith and FIBA Halls of Fame
	Denotes player who is still active
Player (X)	Denotes the number of times the player has been selected
**Player** **(in bold text)**	Indicates the player who won the event's Most Valuable Player award

Year	First Team			Second Team			Ref.
Year	Player	Position	Team	Player	Position	Team	Ref.
1983	Hortência Marcari**	Guard	Brazil	Unknown/not awarded			
1983	Lynette Woodard*	Guard	United States	Unknown/not awarded			
1983	Song Xiaobo	Forward	China	Unknown/not awarded			
1983	Cheryl Miller***	Forward	United States	Unknown/not awarded			
1983	Uljana Semjonova***	Center	Soviet Union	Unknown/not awarded			
1994	Hortência Marcari** (2)	Guard	Brazil	Unknown/not awarded			
1994	Janeth Arcain**	Guard	Brazil	Unknown/not awarded			
1994	Katrina McClain*	Forward	United States	Unknown/not awarded			
1994	Teresa Edwards***	Guard	United States	Unknown/not awarded			
1994	**Zheng Haixia****	Center	China	Unknown/not awarded			
2002	Shannon Johnson	Guard	United States	Unknown/not awarded			
2002	Amaya Valdemoro	Forward	Spain	Unknown/not awarded			
2002	Elena Baranova	Forward	Russia	Unknown/not awarded			
2002	Lauren Jackson*	Forward	Australia	Unknown/not awarded			
2002	**Lisa Leslie***	Center	United States	Unknown/not awarded			
2006	Sue Bird	Guard	United States	Unknown/not awarded			
2006	Diana Taurasi	Guard	United States	Unknown/not awarded			
2006	**Penny Taylor**	Forward	Australia	Unknown/not awarded			
2006	Lauren Jackson* (2)	Forward	Australia	Unknown/not awarded			
2006	Maria Stepanova	Center	Russia	Unknown/not awarded			
2010	**Hana Horáková****	Guard	Czech Republic	Unknown/not awarded			
2010	Diana Taurasi (2)	Guard	United States	Unknown/not awarded			
2010	Eva Vítečková	Forward	Czech Republic	Unknown/not awarded			
2010	Sancho Lyttle	Forward	Spain	Unknown/not awarded			
2010	Yelena Leuchanka	Center	Belarus	Unknown/not awarded			
2014	Alba Torrens	Guard	Spain	Unknown/not awarded			
2014	Penny Taylor (2)	Forward	Australia	Unknown/not awarded			
2014	**Maya Moore**	Forward	United States	Unknown/not awarded			
2014	Sancho Lyttle (2)	Forward	Spain	Unknown/not awarded			
2014	Brittney Griner	Center	United States	Unknown/not awarded			
2018	Diana Taurasi (3)	Guard	United States	Unknown/not awarded			
2018	**Breanna Stewart**	Forward	United States	Unknown/not awarded			
2018	Emma Meesseman	Forward	Belgium	Unknown/not awarded			
2018	Astou Ndour	Center	Spain	Unknown/not awarded			
2018	Liz Cambage	Center	Australia	Unknown/not awarded			
2022	**A'ja Wilson**	Forward	United States	Arella Guirantes	Guard	Puerto Rico	
2022	Breanna Stewart (2)	Forward	United States	Yvonne Anderson	Guard	Serbia	
2022	Steph Talbot	Forward	Australia	Alyssa Thomas	Forward	United States	
2022	Bridget Carleton	Forward	Canada	Gabby Williams	Forward	France	
2022	Han Xu	Center	China	Li Yueru	Center	China	
2026	Iyana Martín	Guard	Spain	Emma Meesseman	Forward	Belgium	
2026	Leonie Fiebich	Forward	Germany	Janelle Salaün	Forward	France	
2026	**Breanna Stewart** (3)	Forward	United States	Nyara Sabally	Forward	Germany	
2026	Gabby Williams	Forward	France	Stephanie Talbot	Forward	Australia	
2026	Jackie Young	Guard	United States	Han Xu	Center	China	

== Most selections ==
The following table only lists players with more than one total selections.

*	Inducted into the Naismith Memorial Basketball Hall of Fame
**	Inducted into the FIBA Hall of Fame
***	Inducted into both the Naismith and FIBA Halls of Fame
	Denotes player who is still active
Italics	Denotes editions with all-tournament teams unknown or not awarded

Player	Position	Team	Total	First team	Second team	MVP	Tournaments
Breanna Stewart	Forward	United States	3	3	0	2	2014, 2018, 2022, 2026
Diana Taurasi	Guard	United States	3	3	—N/a	0	2006, 2010, 2014, 2018
Hortência Marcari**	Guard	Brazil	2	2	—N/a	0	1979, 1983, 1986, 1990, 1994
Penny Taylor	Forward	Australia	2	2	—N/a	1	2002, 2006, 2010, 2014
Lauren Jackson*	Forward	Australia	2	2	0	0	1998, 2002, 2006, 2010, 2022
Sancho Lyttle	Forward	Spain	2	2	—N/a	0	2010, 2014
