= Serbia women's national basketball team =

Women's national basketball team representing Serbia

Serbia
- FIBA ranking: 15 ▼3 (14 September 2026)
- FIBA zone: FIBA Europe
- National federation: KSS
- Coach: Miloš Pavlović
- Nickname(s): Beli orlovi (The White Eagles)

Olympic Games
- Appearances: 3
- Medals: Bronze: 2016

World Cup
- Appearances: 3

EuroBasket
- Appearances: 15
- Medals: Gold: 2015, 2021; Bronze: 2019
| Home | Away |
Medal record
Representing FR Yugoslavia / Serbia and Montenegro / Serbia
Olympic Games
| Bronze medal – third place | 2016 Rio de Janeiro |
EuroBasket
| Gold medal – first place | 2015 Hungary/Romania |
| Gold medal – first place | 2021 France/Spain |
| Bronze medal – third place | 2019 Latvia/Serbia |
Mediterranean Games
| Silver medal – second place | 2009 Italy | Team |
Summer Universiade
| Silver medal – second place | 2005 Izmir |

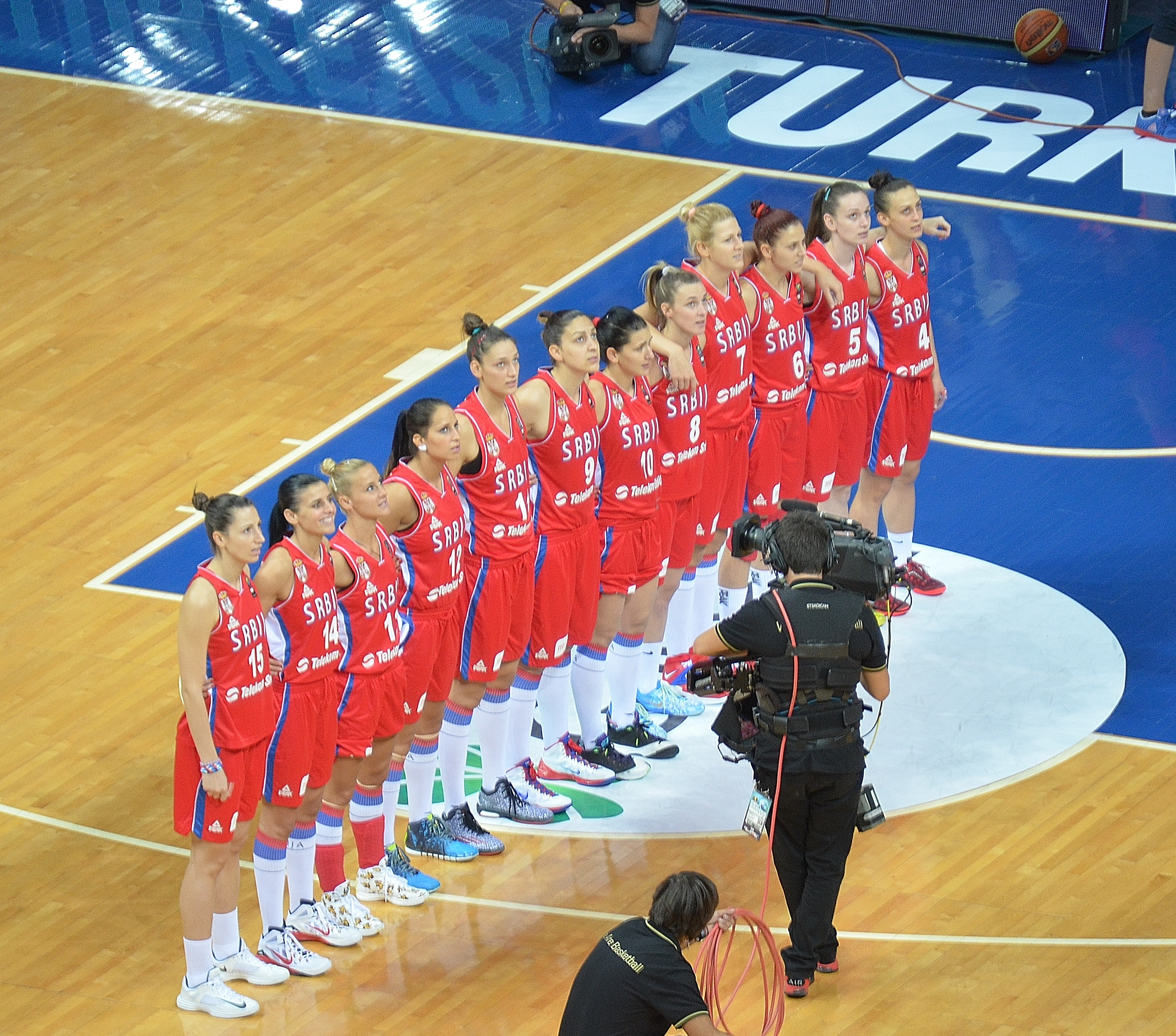
Serbia squad at the 2014 FIBA World Championship for Women.

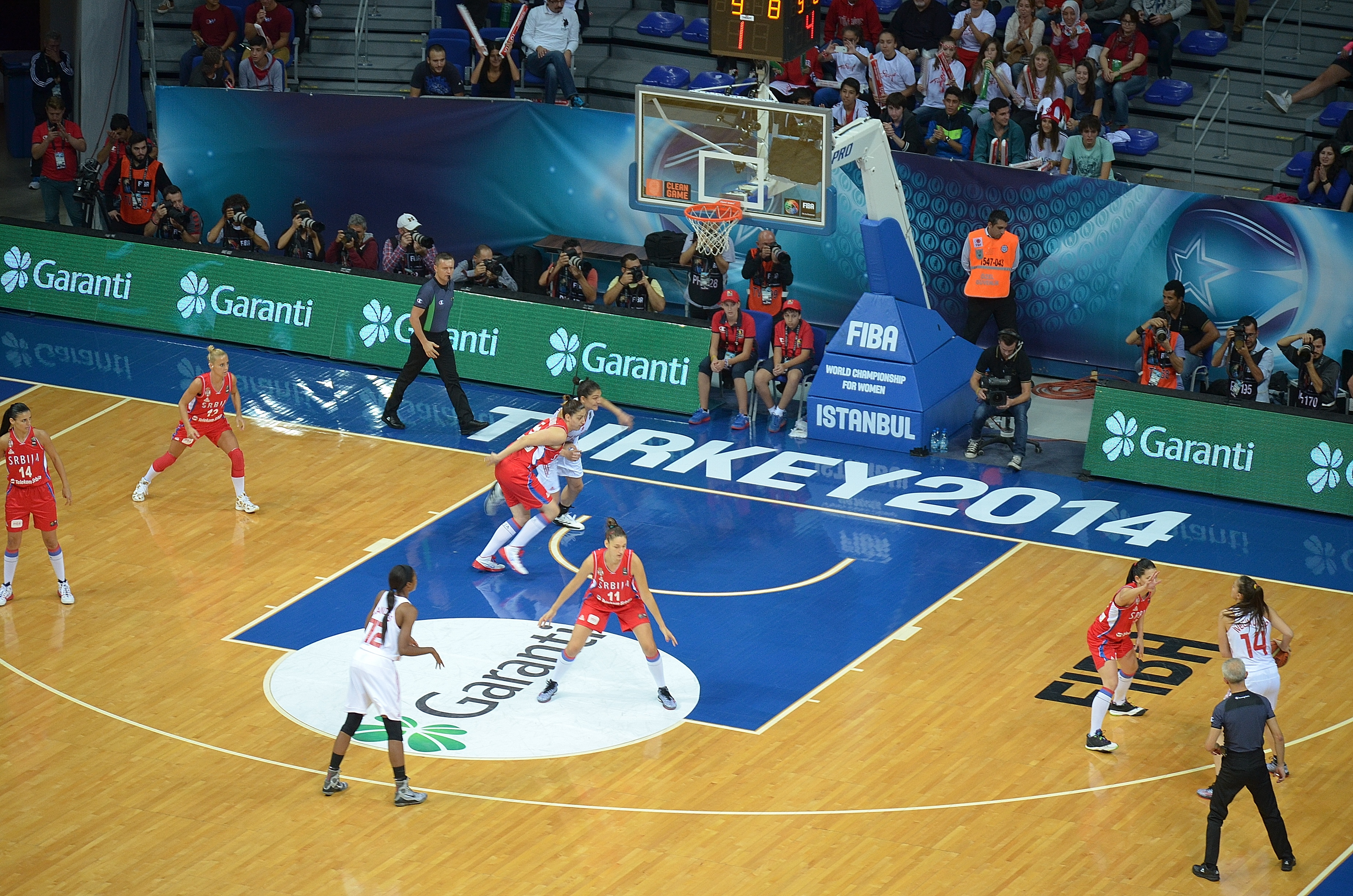
Serbia (red lit) vs Turkey at the 2014 FIBA World Championship for Women.

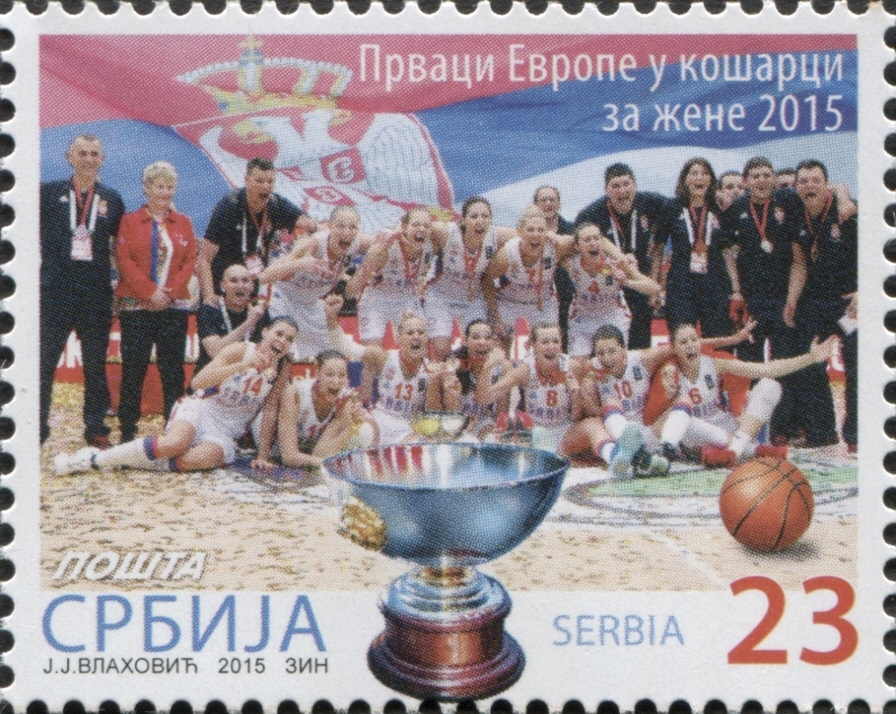
EuroBasket 2015 champions on a 2015 Serbian stamp.

The Serbia women's national basketball team (Serbian: Женска кошаркашка репрезентација Србије, romanized: Ženska košarkaška reprezentacija Srbije) represents Serbia in international women's basketball competition and is controlled by the Basketball Federation of Serbia. Serbia are currently ranked tenth in the FIBA World Rankings.

It was known as the "FR Yugoslavia / Serbia and Montenegro women's national basketball team" until 2006. When Serbia became independent, it became the successor state to Serbia and Montenegro.

For the women's national team that played under the flag of Socialist Federal Republic of Yugoslavia see Yugoslavia women's national basketball team.

== Competitions ==
For the results before 1992, see Yugoslavia women's national basketball team.

Name of the nation during the tournaments:

- FR Yugoslavia / Serbia and Montenegro 1992–2006
- Serbia 2007–present

=== Olympic Games ===
| Year | Round | Position | Pld | W | L |
|---|---|---|---|---|---|
| 1976 – 1988 | part of Yugoslavia | | | | |
| (Spain) 1992 | suspended | | | | |
| (United States) 1996 | did not qualify | | | | |
| (Australia) 2000 | did not qualify | | | | |
| (Greece) 2004 | did not qualify | | | | |
as Serbia 2007–
| (China) 2008 | did not qualify | | | | |
| (United Kingdom) 2012 | did not qualify | | | | |
| (Brazil) 2016 | Third place | 3rd | 8 | 4 | 4 |
| (Japan) 2020 | Semi-finals | 4th | 6 | 3 | 3 |
| (France) 2024 | Quarter-finals | 6th | 4 | 2 | 2 |
| (United States) 2028 | future events | | | | |
| (Australia) 2032 | future events | | | | |
| Total | 0 Titles | 3/8 | 18 | 9 | 9 |

=== FIBA World Cup ===
| Year | Round | Position | Pld | W | L |
|---|---|---|---|---|---|
| 1953 – 1990 | part of Yugoslavia | | | | |
| (Australia) 1994 | did not qualify | | | | |
| (Germany) 1998 | did not qualify | | | | |
| (China) 2002 | Eighth-final round | 12th | 8 | 2 | 6 |
| (Brazil) 2006 | did not qualify | | | | |
as Serbia 2007–
| (Czech Republic) 2010 | did not qualify | | | | |
| (Turkey) 2014 | Quarter-finals | 8th | 7 | 3 | 4 |
| (Spain) 2018 | did not qualify | | | | |
| (Australia) 2022 | Quarter-finals | 6th | 6 | 3 | 3 |
| (Germany) 2026 | did not qualify | | | | |
| (Japan) 2030 | To be determined | | | | |
| Total | 0 Titles | 3/9 | 21 | 8 | 13 |

=== EuroBasket ===
| Year | Round | Position | Pld | W | L |
|---|---|---|---|---|---|
| 1938 – 1991 | part of Yugoslavia | | | | |
| (Italy) 1993 | suspended | | | | |
| (Czech Republic) 1995 | Preliminary round | 10th | 6 | 2 | 4 |
| (Hungary) 1997 | Quarter-finals | 8th | 8 | 3 | 5 |
| (Poland) 1999 | Quarter-finals | 7th | 8 | 4 | 4 |
| (France) 2001 | Quarter-finals | 5th | 8 | 5 | 3 |
| (Greece) 2003 | Quarter-finals | 8th | 8 | 3 | 5 |
| (Turkey) 2005 | Preliminary round | 9th | 7 | 4 | 3 |
as Serbia 2007–
| (Italy) 2007 | Main round | 11th | 6 | 2 | 4 |
| (Latvia) 2009 | Preliminary round | 16th | 3 | 0 | 3 |
| (Poland) 2011 | did not qualify | | | | |
| (France) 2013 | Semi-finals | 4th | 9 | 5 | 4 |
| (Hungary) (Romania) 2015 | Champions | 1st | 10 | 7 | 3 |
| (Czech Republic) 2017 | Preliminary round | 11th | 4 | 1 | 3 |
| (Latvia) (Serbia) 2019 | Third place game | 3rd | 6 | 5 | 1 |
| (France) (Spain) 2021 | Champions | 1st | 6 | 6 | 0 |
| (Israel) (Slovenia) 2023 | Fifth place game | 5th | 7 | 5 | 2 |
| (Czech Republic) (Germany) (Italy) (Greece) 2025 | Preliminary round | 13th | 3 | 0 | 3 |
| (Belgium) (Finland) (Sweden) (Lithuania) 2027 | to be determined | | | | |
| Total | 2 Titles | 15/18 | 99 | 52 | 47 |

=== Mediterranean Games ===
| Year | Round | Position |
|---|---|---|
| (France) 1993 | did not participate | |
| (Italy) 1997 | did not participate | |
| (Tunisia) 2001 | Preliminary round | 7th |
| (Spain) 2005 | did not participate | |
as Serbia 2007–
| (Italy) 2009 | Final | Runners-up |
| (Turkey) 2013 | cancelled | |
| (Spain) 2018 | not part of the programme | |
| (Algeria) 2022 | not part of the programme | |
| Total | 0 Titles | 2/5 |

== Team ==
=== Current roster ===
Roster for the EuroBasket Women 2025.

Serbia women's national basketball team roster
Players
Coaches

| Pos. | No. | Name | Age – Date of birth | Height | Club | Ctr. |
|---|---|---|---|---|---|---|
| PF | 1 | Ivana Raca | 25 – 10 September 1999 | 1.88 m (6 ft 2 in) | Athinaikos | (Greece) |
| SG | 3 | Nevena Rosić | 22 – 5 January 2003 | 1.76 m (5 ft 9 in) | Rutronik Stars Keltern | (Germany) |
| PG | 12 | Yvonne Anderson | 35 – 8 March 1990 | 1.75 m (5 ft 9 in) | ŽKK Crvena zvezda | (Serbia) |
| C | 16 | Marta Mitrović | 23 – 16 March 2002 | 1.85 m (6 ft 1 in) | ŽKK Crvena zvezda | (Serbia) |
| SF | 17 | Jovana Nogić | 27 – 17 December 1997 | 1.81 m (5 ft 11 in) | UMMC Ekaterinburg | (Russia) |
| F | 24 | Teodora Turudić | 25 – 19 July 1999 | 1.80 m (5 ft 11 in) | ŽKK Crvena zvezda | (Serbia) |
| SF | 25 | Maša Janković | 25 – 1 February 2000 | 1.87 m (6 ft 2 in) | Gernika KESB | (Spain) |
| SF | 26 | Jovana Boričić | 22 – 9 May 2003 | 1.77 m (5 ft 10 in) | Vasas SC | (Hungary) |
| PG | 28 | Jovana Popović | 17 – 5 October 2007 | 1.75 m (5 ft 9 in) | ŽKK Art Basket | (Serbia) |
| PF | 32 | Angela Dugalić | 23 – 29 December 2001 | 1.93 m (6 ft 4 in) | UCLA Bruins | (United States) |
| PG | 40 | Ivana Katanić | 26 – 16 April 1999 | 1.74 m (5 ft 9 in) | ŽKK Crvena zvezda | (Serbia) |
| PF | 51 | Mina Đorđević (C) | 26 – 23 February 1999 | 1.86 m (6 ft 1 in) | ŽKK Crvena zvezda | (Serbia) |

Head coach

- (Serbia) Marina Maljković

Assistant coach(es)

- (Serbia) Ljubica Drljača

Legend

- (C) Team captain
- Club – describes last
  club before the tournament
- Age – describes age
  on 18 June 2025

=== Head coaches ===
Since 1992, the national team was managed by a total of eight different head coaches. Miodrag Vesković (3) and Marina Maljković are the only coaches with more than one spell.

Serbia and Montenegro

| Years | Name | Competition |
|---|---|---|
| 1995 | (Serbia and Montenegro) Dragomir Bukvić | 10th 1995 EuroBasket Women |
| 1997 | (Serbia and Montenegro) Slobodan Lukić | 8th 1997 EuroBasket Women |
| 1999 | (Serbia and Montenegro) Miodrag Vesković | 7th 1999 EuroBasket Women |
| 2001–2003 | (Serbia and Montenegro) Miroslav Popov | 5th 2001 EuroBasket Women; 12th 2002 FIBA World Championship |
| 2003 | (Serbia and Montenegro) Miodrag Vesković | 8th 2003 EuroBasket Women |
| 2005 | (Serbia and Montenegro) Zoran Kovačić | 9th 2005 EuroBasket Women |

==== Serbia ====
| Years | Name | Competition |
|---|---|---|
| 2007–2009 | (Serbia) Jovica Antonić | 11th 2007 EuroBasket; 16th 2009 EuroBasket |
| 2010–2011 | (Serbia) Miodrag Vesković | — |
| 2011–2017 | (Serbia) Marina Maljković | 4th 2013 EuroBasket; 8th 2014 World Championship; 2015 EuroBasket; (bronze) 2016 Summer Olympics |
| 2017 | (Serbia) Stevan Karadžić | 11th 2017 EuroBasket |
| 2017–2025 | (Serbia) Marina Maljković | 2019 EuroBasket; 2021 EuroBasket; 4th 2021 Summer Olympics; 6th 2022 World Cup; 5th 2023 EuroBasket; 6th 2024 Summer Olympics; 13th 2025 EuroBasket |
| 2025– | (Serbia) Miloš Pavlović | |

== Notable players ==
- FIBA EuroBasket MVP
  - Ana Dabović – 2015
  - Sonja Vasić – 2021
- FIBA EuroBasket All-Tournament Team
  - Ana Dabović – 2015
  - Sonja Vasić – 2015, 2019, 2021
- WNBA champion
  - Ana Dabović – 2015
- EuroLeague Top Scorer
  - Mila Nikolić – 2000
  - Ana Joković – 2003
  - Gordana Grubin – 2004

== See also ==
- Basketball Federation of Serbia
- Serbia men's national basketball team
- Yugoslavia women's national basketball team
