= FIBA Women's Basketball World Cup Most Valuable Player =

Basketball award

The FIBA Women's Basketball World Cup Most Valuable Player is an award, that is given by FIBA, to the Most Valuable Player of the FIBA Women's Basketball World Cup.

== Winners ==
	Denotes player whose team won that year's tournament
*	Inducted into the Naismith Memorial Basketball Hall of Fame
**	Inducted into the FIBA Hall of Fame
***	Inducted into both the Naismith and FIBA Halls of Fame
	Denotes player who is still active
Player (X)	Denotes the number of times the player had been named MVP at that time
Team (X)	Denotes the number of times a player from this team had won at that time

Year	Player	Position	Team	Ref.
1994	Zheng Haixia**	Center	China	
1998	Elena Baranova	Forward	Russia	
2002	Lisa Leslie***	Center	United States	
2006	Penny Taylor	Forward	Australia	
2010	Hana Horáková**	Guard	Czech Republic	
2014	Maya Moore*	Forward	United States (2)	
2018	Breanna Stewart	Forward	United States (3)	
2022	A'ja Wilson	Forward	United States (4)	
2026	Breanna Stewart (2)	Forward	United States (5)	
