= EuroBasket Women 2011 =

2011 edition of the EuroBasket Women

EuroBasket 2011 Women
33rd FIBA European Women's Basketball Championship
- Eurobasket Women 2011 logo

Tournament details
- Host country: Poland
- Dates: 18 June – 3 July
- Teams: 16 (from 1 federation)
- Venues: 3 (in 3 host cities)

Final positions
- Champions: Russia (3rd title)
- Runners-up: Turkey
- Third place: France
- Fourth place: Czech Republic

Tournament statistics
- MVP: (Russia) Elena Danilochkina
- Top scorer: (Montenegro) Iva Perovanović 16.4
- Top rebounds: (Latvia) Zane Tamane 9.1
- Top assists: (Latvia) Elina Babkina 4.2
- PPG (Team): Russia 69
- RPG (Team): Russia 42.6
- APG (Team): Czech Republic 15.3

Official website
- Official website

The 2011 European Women Basketball Championship, commonly called EuroBasket Women 2011, was the 33rd regional championship held by FIBA Europe. The competition was held in Poland from 18 June to 3 July 2011. This was the 4th time that the EuroBasket Women was hosted by Poland.

Russia won its third title after defeating Turkey in the final. It was Russia's 6th final after the dissolution of the Soviet Union, while Turkey played final for the 1st time. The result score was 59–42 in favor of Russia, and it was Russia's 3rd title in the competition and first since 2007.

== Venues ==
City	Arena	Capacity	Competition Stage
Bydgoszcz	Łuczniczka	8 000	First/Second round
Katowice	Spodek	11 500	First/Second round
Łódź	Arena Łódź	13 400	Final round

== Competition system ==
=== Preliminary round (June 18 – June 20) ===
The 16 participants were divided into four groups of four teams each. The top three teams in each group advanced to the qualifying round. The last team was eliminated.

=== Qualifying round (June 22 – June 27) ===
There were two groups of six teams, each composed of the qualifiers from two preliminary-round groups. The results in the preliminary round were taken into account. Each team played the teams that qualified from the other group. The top four teams advanced to the quarterfinals. The bottom two teams were eliminated.

=== Final round (June 29 – July 3) ===
This stage was played in a knock-out system. In the quarterfinals, the first team in one group played the fourth team in the other group, while the second place team played against the third team in the opposite group. The winners of the quarterfinals advanced to the semifinals, and the winners of the semis progressed to the final. The losers in the quarterfinals played for fifth to eighth places.

== Qualified teams ==
Competition	Date	Vacancies	Qualified
Host Nation	–	1	Poland
Participant of 2010 FIBA World Championship for Women	23 September 2010– 3 October 2010	6	Belarus; Czech Republic; France; Greece; Russia; Spain
Qualified through EuroBasket Women 2011 qualification	2 August 2010 – 11 June 2011	9	Croatia; Great Britain; Israel; Latvia; Lithuania; Montenegro; Slovakia; Turkey; Germany

== Group draw ==
The draw was held on 11 December 2010 at Łódź.

Line 1	Line 2	Line 3	Line 4
France; Russia; Spain; Belarus	Greece; Czech Republic; Poland; Turkey	Lithuania; Montenegro; Latvia; Israel	Great Britain; Croatia; Slovakia; Germany

== Preliminary round ==
=== Group A ===
Team	Pld	W	L	PF	PA	PD	Pts
Lithuania	3	2	1	186	179	+7	5
Russia	3	2	1	212	207	+5	5
Turkey	3	1	2	199	204	−5	4
Slovakia	3	1	2	183	190	−7	4

18 June 2011
12:30

Report

Turkey	58–64	Lithuania
Scoring by quarter: 12–19, 10–18, 16–14, 20–13
Pts: Yılmaz 17; Rebs: İvegin-Karslı, Çağlar 5 Asts: İvegin-Karslı 4		Pts: Petronytė 15; Rebs: Linkeviciene 8 Asts: Linkeviciene 3

Łuczniczka, Bydgoszcz
Referees: Grzegorz Ziemblicki (POL), Igor Dragojevic (MNE), Moritz Reiter (GER)

18 June 2011
18:00

Report

Russia	68–66	Slovakia
Scoring by quarter: 12–15, 17–19, 23–17, 16–15
Pts: Kuzina 13; Rebs: Stepanova 8 Asts: Abrosimova, Popova 4		Pts: Lawless 15; Rebs: Lawless 7 Asts: Misurová

Łuczniczka, Bydgoszcz
Referees: Miguel Anguel Perez Niz (ESP), Panagiotis Anastopoulos (GRE), Tomasz Trawicki (POL)

19 June 2011
12:30

Report

Slovakia	60–76	Turkey
Scoring by quarter: 18–21, 14–17, 9–24, 19–14
Pts: Lawless 15; Rebs: Jurcenkova 5 Asts: Misurová 4		Pts: Vardarlı 20; Rebs: Vardarlı 6 Asts: Yılmaz 4

Łuczniczka, Bydgoszcz
Referees: Paolo Taurino (ITA), Ingus Baumanis (LAT), Haris Bijedic (BIH)

19 June 2011
18:00

Report

Lithuania	76–64	Russia
Scoring by quarter: 16–16, 14–19, 26–17, 20–12
Pts: Bimbaite, Sulciute 20; Rebs: Sulciute 8 Asts: Linkeviciene 5		Pts: Stepanova 17; Rebs: Stepanova 13; Asts: Stepanova 3

Łuczniczka, Bydgoszcz
Referees: Sinisa Herceg (CRO), Carole Delauné (FRA), Antonis Demetriou (CYP)

20 June 2011
12:30

Report

Slovakia	57–46	Lithuania
Scoring by quarter: 18–8, 13–9, 15–16, 11–13
Pts: Kupcikova 18; Rebs: Tetemondová 8 Asts: Kupcikova 4		Pts: Solopova 14; Rebs: Paugaite 6 Asts: Valentiene 2

Łuczniczka, Bydgoszcz
Referees: Panagiotis Anastopoulos (GRE), Tomasz Trawicki (POL), Maka Kupatadze (GEO)

20 June 2011
18:00

Report

Turkey	65–80	Russia
Scoring by quarter: 7–29, 20–16, 15–13, 23–22
Pts: Yılmaz 18; Rebs: Yılmaz 4 Asts: Vardarlı, Alben, Yılmaz 4		Pts: three players 13; Rebs: Arteshina 8 Asts: Abrosimova 6

Łuczniczka, Bydgoszcz
Attendance: 200
Referees: Grzegorz Ziemblicki (POL), Miguel Anguel Perez Niz (ESP), Fabiana Nitu (ROU)

=== Group B ===
Team	Pld	W	L	PF	PA	PD	Pts
Czech Republic	3	3	0	199	163	+36	6
Belarus	3	2	1	185	148	+37	5
Great Britain	3	1	2	159	166	−7	4
Israel	3	0	3	148	214	−66	3

18 June 2011
15:00

Report

Belarus	55–40	Great Britain
Scoring by quarter: 14–11, 17–9, 14–8, 10–12
Pts: Snytsina, Verameyenka 10; Rebs: Leuchanka 8 Asts: Marchanka, Trafimava 5		Pts: Butler 8 Rebs: Butler 6 Asts: four players 2

Łuczniczka, Bydgoszcz
Referees: Sinisa Herceg (CRO), Antonis Demetriou (CYP), Fabiana Nitu (ROU)

18 June 2011
20:30

Report

Czech Republic	72–56	Israel
Scoring by quarter: 19–12, 13–10, 20–17, 20–17
Pts: Vitecková 14; Rebs: Veselá 10; Asts: Elhotova 5		Pts: Doron 16; Rebs: three players 4 Asts: Shafir 3

Łuczniczka, Bydgoszcz
Referees: Paolo Taurino (ITA), Ingus Baumanis (LAT), Carole Delauné (FRA)

19 June 2011
15:00

Report

Israel	41–68	Belarus
Scoring by quarter: 12–18, 6–8, 18–21, 5–21
Pts: Cohen 12; Rebs: Levitsky 6 Asts: Cohen, Doron 2		Pts: Likhtarovich 13; Rebs: Kress 13; Asts: Leuchanka, Marchanka 4

Łuczniczka, Bydgoszcz
Referees: Grzegorz Ziemblicki (POL), Panagiotis Anastopoulos (GRE), Igor Dragojevic (MNE)

19 June 2011
20:30

Report

Great Britain	45–60	Czech Republic
Scoring by quarter: 13–9, 10–18, 12–21, 10–12
Pts: Leedham 14; Rebs: Stewart 6 Asts: Collins 4		Pts: Elhotova 27; Rebs: Burgrová 9 Asts: Bartonova 4

Łuczniczka, Bydgoszcz
Referees: Miguel Anguel Perez Niz (ESP), Tomasz Trawicki (POL), Maka Kupatadze (GEO)

20 June 2011
15:00

Report

Great Britain	74–51	Israel
Scoring by quarter: 13–11, 24–13, 17–13, 20–14
Pts: Leedham 18; Rebs: Page 9 Asts: Stafford, Page 5		Pts: Doron 15; Rebs: three players 4 Asts: Doron 3

Łuczniczka, Bydgoszcz
Referees: Paolo Taurino (ITA), Moritz Reiter (GER), Haris Bijedic (BIH)

20 June 2011
20:30

Report

Czech Republic	67–62	Belarus
Scoring by quarter: 23–9, 16–17, 15–20, 13–16
Pts: Elhotova 19; Rebs: Elhotova, Kulichová 5 Asts: five players 3		Pts: Snytsina, Leuchanka 10; Rebs: Leuchanka 12; Asts: Marchanka 6

Łuczniczka, Bydgoszcz
Attendance: 250
Referees: Sinisa Herceg (CRO), Ingus Baumanis (LAT), Antonis Demetriou (CYP)

=== Group C ===
Team	Pld	W	L	PF	PA	PD	Pts
Montenegro	3	3	0	212	174	+38	6
Spain	3	2	1	214	198	+16	5
Poland	3	1	2	191	208	−17	4
Germany	3	0	3	193	230	−37	3

18 June 2011
15:00

Report

Spain	79–69	Germany
Scoring by quarter: 21–12, 18–15, 19–22, 21–20
Pts: Torrens 18; Rebs: Valdemoro 5 Asts: Torrens 4		Pts: Bär 14; Rebs: Bär 6 Asts: Bär, Menz 4

Spodek, Katowice
Attendance: 400
Referees: Aleksandar Glisic (SRB), Aare Halliko (EST), Aliaksandr Syrytsa (BLR)

18 June 2011
18:00

Report

Poland	53–70	Montenegro
Scoring by quarter: 15–18, 11–19, 12–17, 15–16
Pts: Szott 11; Rebs: Szott 6 Asts: Kobryn 3		Pts: DeForge 18; Rebs: Dubljević 9 Asts: Dubljević 5

Spodek, Katowice
Referees: Engin Kennerman (TUR), Haydn Jones (WAL), Milan Brziak (SVK)

19 June 2011
12:30

Report

Montenegro	66–57	Spain
Scoring by quarter: 20–13, 19–18, 15–16, 12–10
Pts: Perovanović 18; Rebs: Škerović 11; Asts: Dubljević 5		Pts: Torrens 25; Rebs: Lyttle 6 Asts: Dominguez 3

Spodek, Katowice
Attendance: 300
Referees: Ivo Dolinek (CZE), Elena Chernova (RUS), Mindaugas Vecerskis (LTU)

19 June 2011
18:00

Report

Germany	60–75	Poland
Scoring by quarter: 19–23, 11–7, 15–24, 15–21
Pts: Bär 13; Rebs: Bär 6 Asts: Bär 5		Pts: Kobryn 16; Rebs: Kobryn 9 Asts: Pawlak 5

Spodek, Katowice
Attendance: 4,000
Referees: Yaari Rainisch (ISR), Aare Halliko (EST), Asa Johansson (SWE)

20 June 2011
12:30

Report

Germany	64–76	Montenegro
Scoring by quarter: 15–25, 15–10, 19–19, 15–22
Pts: Greunke 20; Rebs: Greunke 8 Asts: Austmann 3		Pts: Bjelica 23; Rebs: Bjelica 10; Asts: Jovanović 3

Spodek, Katowice
Attendance: 150
Referees: Haydn Jones (WAL), Aliaksandr Syrytsa (BLR), Bernard Vassallo (MLT)

20 June 2011
18:00

Report

Poland	63–78	Spain
Scoring by quarter: 20–20, 11–17, 19–13, 13–28
Pts: Kobryn 20; Rebs: Kobryn 13; Asts: Pawlak 6		Pts: Lyttle 18; Rebs: Pascua, Lyttle 7 Asts: Pascua 4

Spodek, Katowice
Attendance: 4,300
Referees: Engin Kennerman (TUR), Elena Chernova (RUS), Milan Brziak (SVK)

=== Group D ===
Team	Pld	W	L	PF	PA	PD	Pts
Latvia	3	2	1	183	184	−1	5
France	3	2	1	206	154	+52	5
Croatia	3	1	2	166	216	−50	4
Greece	3	1	2	185	186	−1	4

18 June 2011
12:30

Report

Greece	67–57	Latvia
Scoring by quarter: 16–14, 19–22, 13–10, 19–11
Pts: Kalentzou 20; Rebs: Maltsi 12; Asts: Kaltsidou 4		Pts: three players 12; Rebs: Tamane 13; Asts: Babkina 7

Spodek, Katowice
Referees: Ivo Dolinek (CZE), Sérgio Silva (POR), Asa Johansson (SWE)

18 June 2011
20:30

Report

France	86–40	Croatia
Scoring by quarter: 26–16, 22–9, 23–10, 15–5
Pts: Lawson-Wade, Gomis 13; Rebs: Gruda 8 Asts: Ndongue 4		Pts: Mandir 9 Rebs: Pavetić 5 Asts: Mandir 2

Spodek, Katowice
Attendance: 2,000
Referees: Yaari Rainisch (ISR), Elena Chernova (RUS), Mindaugas Vecerskis (LTU)

19 June 2011
15:00

Report

Croatia	65–63	Greece
Scoring by quarter: 26–16, 16–13, 11–14, 12–20
Pts: Mandir 19; Rebs: Ivezić 9 Asts: Mandir 5		Pts: Kalentzou, Kaltsidou 14; Rebs: Kaltsidou 12; Asts: Chatzinikolaou, Kaltsidou 4

Spodek, Katowice
Attendance: 300
Referees: Engin Kennerman (TUR), Aliaksandr Syrytsa (BLR), Bernard Vassallo (MLT)

19 June 2011
20:30

Report

Latvia	59–56 (OT)	France
Scoring by quarter: 13–16, 9–12, 14–13, 14–9, Overtime: 9–6
Pts: Babkina 26; Rebs: Tamane 15; Asts: Kublina 3		Pts: Miyem 12; Rebs: Ndongue 9 Asts: Dumerc 6

Spodek, Katowice
Referees: Aleksandar Glisic (SRB), Haydn Jones (WAL), Gentian Cici (ALB)

20 June 2011
15:00

Report

Croatia	61–67	Latvia
Scoring by quarter: 16–20, 25–14, 12–17, 8–16
Pts: Ivezić 14; Rebs: Ivezić 6 Asts: three players 4		Pts: Basko 16; Rebs: Tamane 9 Asts: Babkina 6

Spodek, Katowice
Attendance: 300
Referees: Ivo Dolinek (CZE), Aare Halliko (EST), Sérgio Silva (POR)

20 June 2011
20:30

Report

Greece	55–64	France
Scoring by quarter: 13–16, 6–15, 16–15, 20–18
Pts: Maltsi 16; Rebs: Kalentzou, Papamichail 6 Asts: Kalentzou 3		Pts: Gruda 19; Rebs: Gruda 8 Asts: Beikes, Gomis 3

Spodek, Katowice
Attendance: 800
Referees: Aleksandar Glisic (SRB), Yaari Rainisch (ISR), Gentian Cici (ALB)

== Main round ==
=== Group E ===
Team	Pld	W	L	PF	PA	PD	Pts
Czech Republic	5	4	1	301	284	+17	9
Lithuania	5	4	1	331	298	+33	9
Russia	5	3	2	324	317	+7	8
Turkey	5	2	3	303	313	−10	7
Belarus	5	2	3	285	291	−6	7
Great Britain	5	0	5	264	305	−41	5

23 June 2011
15:30

Report

Great Britain	63–64	Lithuania
Scoring by quarter: 15–16, 17–14, 17–18, 14–16
Pts: Page 19; Rebs: Stewart 9 Asts: Stafford 4		Pts: Bimbaite 16; Rebs: Linkeviciene 7 Asts: Linkeviciene 4

Łuczniczka, Bydgoszcz
Referees: Panagiotis Anastopoulos (GRE), Ingus Baumanis (LAT), Carole Delauné (FRA)

23 June 2011
18:00

Report

Belarus	62–51	Russia
Scoring by quarter: 10–14, 14–11, 26–15, 12–11
Pts: Marchanka 11; Rebs: Leuchanka 11; Asts: Marchanka 4		Pts: Stepanova 12; Rebs: Osipova 7 Asts: Sapova 3

Łuczniczka, Bydgoszcz
Attendance: 200
Referees: Paolo Taurino (ITA), Grzegorz Ziemblicki (POL), Moritz Reiter (GER)

23 June 2011
20:30

Report

Turkey	51–56	Czech Republic
Scoring by quarter: 12–18, 10–8, 15–10, 14–20
Pts: Palazoğlu, Yılmaz 11; Rebs: Vardarlı 8 Asts: Vardarlı 6		Pts: Elhotova 19; Rebs: Veselá 6 Asts: Bortelová, Vitecková 4

Łuczniczka, Bydgoszcz
Attendance: 200
Referees: Sinisa Herceg (CRO), Igor Dragojevic (MNE), Haris Bijedic (BIH)

25 June 2011
15:30

Report

Great Britain	57–64	Turkey
Scoring by quarter: 15–17, 12–16, 13–12, 17–19
Pts: Stafford 18; Rebs: Page 13; Asts: Page 3		Pts: Yılmaz 18; Rebs: Nevlin 9 Asts: Kartaltepe, İvegin-Karslı 3

Łuczniczka, Bydgoszcz
Attendance: 150
Referees: Paolo Taurino (ITA), Igor Dragojevic (MNE), Maka Kupatadze (GEO)

25 June 2011
18:00

Report

Russia	69–55	Czech Republic
Scoring by quarter: 16–9, 22–13, 13–9, 18–24
Pts: Danilochkina 16; Rebs: Osipova 10; Asts: Arteshina 4		Pts: Zrustova 11; Rebs: Veselá 7 Asts: Bartonova 4

Łuczniczka, Bydgoszcz
Attendance: 200
Referees: Panagiotis Anastopoulos (GRE), Tomasz Trawicki (POL), Ingus Baumanis (LAT)

25 June 2011
20:30

Report

Lithuania	68–50	Belarus
Scoring by quarter: 13–12, 16–9, 15–17, 24–12
Pts: Linkeviciene 15; Rebs: Linkeviciene 11; Asts: Bimbaite 4		Pts: Verameyenka 13; Rebs: Verameyenka 7 Asts: Verameyenka, Marchanka 3

Łuczniczka, Bydgoszcz
Attendance: 250
Referees: Sinisa Herceg (CRO), Miguel Anguel Perez Niz (ESP), Fabiana Nitu (ROU)

27 June 2011
15:30

Report

Russia	62–59	Great Britain
Scoring by quarter: 8–20, 14–7, 21–19, 19–13
Pts: Danilochkina 16; Rebs: Osipova 12; Asts: Arteshina, Osipova 3		Pts: Butler 15; Rebs: Page, Leedham 8 Asts: three players 2

Łuczniczka, Bydgoszcz
Referees: Grzegorz Ziemblicki (POL), Moritz Reiter (GER), Antonis Demetriou (CYP)

27 June 2011
18:00

Report

Czech Republic	63–59	Lithuania
Scoring by quarter: 14–22, 21–14, 14–8, 14–15
Pts: Vitecková 26; Rebs: Burgrová 11; Asts: Bortelová 9		Pts: Bimbaite 15; Rebs: Bimbaite 8 Asts: Bimbaite, Linkeviciene 3

Łuczniczka, Bydgoszcz
Attendance: 300
Referees: Miguel Anguel Perez Niz (ESP), Paolo Taurino (ITA), Igor Dragojevic (MNE)

27 June 2011
20:30

Report

Belarus	56–65	Turkey
Scoring by quarter: 14–24, 16–10, 4–15, 22–16
Pts: Marchanka 12; Rebs: Verameyenka 7 Asts: Trafimava, Leuchanka 3		Pts: İvegin-Karslı 17; Rebs: Yılmaz 11; Asts: Vardarlı 7

Łuczniczka, Bydgoszcz
Attendance: 200
Referees: Sinisa Herceg (CRO), Tomasz Trawicki (POL), Ingus Baumanis (LAT)

=== Group F ===
Team	Pld	W	L	PF	PA	PD	Pts
Montenegro	5	5	0	364	308	+56	10
Latvia	5	3	2	315	310	+5	8
France	5	3	2	347	281	+66	8
Croatia	5	2	3	300	361	−61	7
Spain	5	2	3	327	340	−13	7
Poland	5	0	5	279	332	−53	5

22 June 2011
15:30

Boxscore

Croatia	60–81	Montenegro
Scoring by quarter: 17–24, 17–21, 14–15, 12–21
Pts: Mandir 14; Rebs: Mazić 8 Asts: Mandir 7		Pts: Perovanović 25; Rebs: three players 15; Asts: DeForge 8

Spodek, Katowice
Attendance: 200
Referees: Engin Kennerman (TUR), Aare Halliko (EST), Sérgio Silva (POR)

22 June 2011
18:00

Boxscore

Poland	53–62	Latvia
Scoring by quarter: 18–17, 15–12, 7–17, 13–16
Pts: Mowlik, Kobryn 13; Rebs: Kobryn 7 Asts: Pawlak 4		Pts: Basko 19; Rebs: Tamane 13; Asts: Babkina 7

Spodek, Katowice
Attendance: 3,000
Referees: Aleksandar Glisic (SRB), Elena Chernova (RUS), Gentian Cici (ALB)

22 June 2011
20:30

Boxscore

France	79–55	Spain
Scoring by quarter: 17–15, 13–12, 16–21, 33–7
Pts: Gruda 17; Rebs: Yacoubou-Dehoui 8 Asts: Dumerc 4		Pts: Montañana, Lyttle 11; Rebs: Montañana, Lyttle 5 Asts: Cruz 4

Spodek, Katowice
Referees: Ivo Dolinek (CZE), Haydn Jones (WAL), Mindaugas Vecerskis (LTU)

24 June 2011
15:30

Boxscore

Spain	66–57	Latvia
Scoring by quarter: 13–10, 14–13, 19–13, 20–21
Pts: Montañana, Lyttle 16; Rebs: Lyttle 9 Asts: Montañana 6		Pts: Babkina 17; Rebs: Kublina 10; Asts: Basko, Babkina 3

Spodek, Katowice
Attendance: 350
Referees: Aleksandar Glisic (SRB), Haydn Jones (WAL), Bernard Vassallo (MLT)

24 June 2011
18:00

Boxscore

Croatia	64–56	Poland
Scoring by quarter: 24–21, 20–17, 11–8, 9–10
Pts: Mandir, Ivanković 13; Rebs: Mandir, Mazić 9 Asts: Mandir 4		Pts: Kobryn 17; Rebs: Kaczmarczyk 6 Asts: Mowlik, Pawlak 2

Spodek, Katowice
Attendance: 3,000
Referees: Ivo Dolinek (CZE), Milan Brziak (SVK), Aliaksandr Syrytsa (BLR)

24 June 2011
20:30

Boxscore

Montenegro	73–68	France
Scoring by quarter: 22–20, 18–17, 17–18, 16–13
Pts: Perovanovič 22; Rebs: Dubljević, Turčinović 6 Asts: Škerović 4		Pts: Miyem 21; Rebs: Miyem, Gruda 5 Asts: Dumerc 6

Spodek, Katowice
Referees: Engin Kennerman (TUR), Yaari Rainisch (ISR), Gentian Cici (ALB)

26 June 2011
15:30

Boxscore

France	58–54	Poland
Scoring by quarter: 8–15, 16–4, 15–25, 19–10
Pts: Gomis 15; Rebs: Beikes 6 Asts: Beikes 3		Pts: Kobryn 16; Rebs: Kobryn 9 Asts: Pawlak 4

Spodek, Katowice
Attendance: 2,500
Referees: Yaari Rainisch (ISR), Mindaugas Vecerskis (LTU), Asa Johansson (SWE)

26 June 2011
18:00

Boxscore

Spain	71–75	Croatia
Scoring by quarter: 18–19, 22–19, 15–16, 16–21
Pts: Palau 19; Rebs: Pascua 8 Asts: Cruz 4		Pts: Mandir 24; Rebs: Mazić 15; Asts: Ciglar 5

Spodek, Katowice
Attendance: 1,000
Referees: Engin Kennerman (TUR), Aare Halliko (EST), Elena Chernova (RUS)

26 June 2011
20:30

Boxscore

Latvia	70–74	Montenegro
Scoring by quarter: 22–16, 14–29, 12–13, 22–16
Pts: Kublina 16; Rebs: Tamane 10; Asts: Basko 5		Pts: Dubljević 24; Rebs: Dubljević 11; Asts: Dubljević 6

Spodek, Katowice
Attendance: 600
Referees: Ivo Dolinek (CZE), Sérgio Silva (POR), Bernard Vassallo (MLT)

== Knockout stage ==
=== Championship bracket ===
Quarter-finals
June 29
Czech Republic	79
Croatia	63
June 29
Latvia	72
Russia	83
June 30
Lithuania	58
France	66
June 30
Montenegro	44
Turkey	56

Semi-finals
July 1
Czech Republic	53
Russia	85
July 1
France	62
Turkey	68

Final
July 3
Russia	59
Turkey	42
Third place
July 3
Czech Republic	56
France	63

=== 5th place bracket ===
Semi-finals
June 30
Croatia	84
Latvia	75
July 1
Lithuania	59
Montenegro	68

Fifth place
July 2
Croatia	73
Montenegro	59
Seventh place
July 2
Latvia	56
Lithuania	75

=== Quarterfinals ===
29 June 2011
18:00

Report

Latvia	72–83	Russia
Scoring by quarter: 18–23, 19–25, 18–17, 17–18
Pts: Babkina 21; Rebs: Kublina, Tamane 6 Asts: Babkina 3		Pts: Danilochkina 18; Rebs: Stepanova 11; Asts: Stepanova, Abrosimova 4

Arena Łódź, Łódź
Referees: Aleksandar Glisić (SRB), Panagiotis Anastopoulos (GRE), Igor Dragojevic (MNE)

29 June 2011
20:30

Report

Czech Republic	79–63	Croatia
Scoring by quarter: 21–13, 15–16, 31–11, 12–23
Pts: Vitecková 17; Rebs: Kulichová 9 Asts: Burgrová, Veselá 4		Pts: Mandir 27; Rebs: Mazić 7 Asts: Mandir 4

Arena Łódź, Łódź
Attendance: 500
Referees: Miguel Anguel Perez Niz (ESP), Engin Kennerman (TUR), Haydn Jones (WAL)

30 June 2011
18:00

Report

Montenegro	44–56	Turkey
Scoring by quarter: 16–11, 11–13, 6–17, 11–15
Pts: DeForge 11; Rebs: Perovanović 12; Asts: Škerović 5		Pts: İvegin-Karslı 14; Rebs: Yılmaz 9 Asts: Vardarlı 5

Arena Łódź, Łódź
Referees: Paolo Taurino (ITA), Aare Halliko (EST), Gentian Cici (ALB)

30 June 2011
20:30

Report

Lithuania	58–66	France
Scoring by quarter: 13–11, 21–22, 8–20, 16–13
Pts: Sulciute 10; Rebs: Linkeviciene 5 Asts: Bimbaite 3		Pts: Gomis 14; Rebs: Gruda 8 Asts: Dumerc, Lepron 4

Arena Łódź, Łódź
Attendance: 1,500
Referees: Ivo Dolinek (CZE), Sinisa Herceg (CRO), Sérgio Silva (POR)

=== Classification round ===
30 June 2011
15:30

Report

Croatia	84–75	Latvia
Scoring by quarter: 15–20, 22–14, 24–18, 23–23
Pts: Ivezic 19; Rebs: Karcic 7 Asts: Ciglar 9		Pts: Tamane 16; Rebs: Kublina 13; Asts: Tamane 5

Arena Łódź, Łódź
Referees: Yaari Rainisch (ISR), Moritz Reiter (GER), Fabiana Nitu (ROU)

1 July 2011
15:30

Report

Montenegro	68–59	Lithuania
Scoring by quarter: 14–12, 15–17, 16–24, 23–6
Pts: Perovanović 18; Rebs: Škerović 6 Asts: Škerović 4		Pts: Linkeviciene 15; Rebs: Linkeviciene 10; Asts: Bimbaite 4

Arena Łódź, Łódź
Referees: Engin Kennerman (TUR), Grzegorz Ziemblicki (POL), Carole Delauné (FRA)

=== Semifinals ===
1 July 2011
18:00

Report

Russia	85–53	Czech Republic
Scoring by quarter: 22–18, 17–8, 22–17, 24–10
Pts: Danilochkina 18; Rebs: Stepanova 8 Asts: Abrosimova 3		Pts: Burgrová, Kulichová 10; Rebs: Veselá, Kulichová 5 Asts: Bartonova, Bortelová 4

Arena Łódź, Łódź
Referees: Sinisa Herceg (CRO), Igor Dragojević (MNE), Haydn Jones (WAL)

1 July 2011
20:30

Report

Turkey	68–62 (OT)	France
Scoring by quarter: 16–15, 22–16, 11–11, 11–18, Overtime: 8–2
Pts: Nevlin 23; Rebs: Yılmaz 11; Asts: Vardarlı 5		Pts: Gomis 24; Rebs: Gomis 9 Asts: Lawson-Wade, Dumerc 4

Arena Łódź, Łódź
Referees: Paolo Taurino (ITA), Panagiotis Anastopoulos (GRE), Ingus Baumanis (LAT)

=== Seventh place game ===
2 July 2011
18:00

Report

Latvia	56–75	Lithuania
Scoring by quarter: 12–20, 6–14, 23–15, 15–26
Pts: three players 10; Rebs: Tamane 7 Asts: Babkina 4		Pts: Bimbaite, Sulciute 15; Rebs: Linkeviciene 8 Asts: Bimbaite, Sulciute 4

Arena Łódź, Łódź
Referees: Yaari Rainisch (ISR), Gentian Cici (ALB), Carole Delauné (FRA)

=== Fifth place game ===
2 July 2011
20:30

Report

Croatia	73–59	Montenegro
Scoring by quarter: 14–16, 24–19, 17–9, 18–15
Pts: Ivezić 21; Rebs: Ivezić, Karcic 8 Asts: Ciglar 5		Pts: DeForge 18; Rebs: Dubljević 10; Asts: Perovanović, Škerović 3

Arena Łódź, Łódź
Attendance: 1,000
Referees: Engin Kennerman (TUR), Aare Halliko (EST), Sérgio Silva (POR)

=== Bronze medal game ===
3 July 2011
18:00

Report

Czech Republic	56–63	France
Scoring by quarter: 20–15, 10–9, 13–19, 13–20
Pts: Elhotova 17; Rebs: Bortelová 7 Asts: Bortelová 6		Pts: Gruda 26; Rebs: Dumerc 8 Asts: Dumerc 5

Arena Łódź, Łódź
Attendance: 3,000
Referees: Paolo Taurino (ITA), Ingus Baumanis (LAT), Fabiana Nitu (ROU)

=== Final ===
3 July 2011
20:30

Report

Russia	59–42	Turkey
Scoring by quarter: 19–8, 14–15, 13–11, 13–8
Pts: Stepanova 18; Rebs: Stepanova 12; Asts: Osipova 4		Pts: Vardarlı 10; Rebs: Yılmaz 5 Asts: Vardarlı 4

Arena Łódź, Łódź
Attendance: 5,000
Referees: Miguel Anguel Perez Niz (ESP), Ivo Dolinek (CZE), Aleksandar Glišić (SRB)

Eurobasket Women 2011 champion

Russia
Third title

Eurobasket Women 2011 MVP: Elena Danilochkina (Russia)

All EuroBasket Women 2011 team:

- Maria Stepanova (Russia)
- Nevriye Yılmaz (Turkey)
- Eva Viteckova (Czech Republic)
- Sandra Mandir (Croatia)
- Elena Danilochkina (Russia)

== Statistical leaders ==
Points

Name	PPG
(Montenegro) Iva Perovanović	16.4
(Poland) Ewelina Kobryn	14.7
(Latvia) Elina Babkina	14.4
(Croatia) Sandra Mandir	14.3
(Czech Republic) Katerina Elhotova	14.2

Rebounds

Name	RPG
(Latvia) Zane Tamane	9.1
(Russia) Maria Stepanova	8.9
(Belarus) Yelena Leuchanka	8.2
(Montenegro) Iva Perovanović	7.8
(Poland) Ewelina Kobryn	7.7

Assists

Name	APG
(Latvia) Elina Babkina	4.2
(Czech Republic) Veronika Bortelová	4.1
(Turkey) Birsel Vardarlı	4.0
(Belarus) Natallia Marchanka	3.8
(Croatia) Sandra Mandir	3.8

Blocks

Name	BPG
(France) Sandrine Gruda	1.7
(Poland) Ewelina Kobryn	1.7
(Latvia) Zane Tamane	1.4
(Belarus) Anastasiya Verameyenka	1.4
(Czech Republic) Ilona Burgrová	1.2

Steals

Name	SPG
(Spain) Laia Palau	2.7
(Spain) Sancho Lyttle	2.5
(Lithuania) Sandra Linkeviciene	2.4
(Montenegro) Jelena Škerović	2.3
(Lithuania) Ausra Bimbaite	2.3

== Final standings ==
Place	Team
1	Russia
2	Turkey
3	France
4	Czech Republic
5	Croatia
6	Montenegro
7	Lithuania
8	Latvia
9–10	Belarus
9–10	Spain
11-12	Great Britain
11-12	Poland
13–16	Greece
13–16	Slovakia
13–16	Germany
13–16	Israel
