= Basketball at the 2012 Summer Olympics – Women's tournament =

Tournament details
- Host country: London
- Dates: 28 - July - 11 August 2012
- Teams: 12 (from 5 confederations)
- Venues: 2 (in 1 host city)

Final positions
- Champions: United States (7th title)

Tournament statistics
- Games played: 38
- Top scorer: (Brazil) de Souza (United Kingdom) Leedham (16.2)
- Top rebounds: (Brazil) dos Santos (9.0)
- Top assists: (China) Miao (6.5)
- PPG (Team): United States (90.6)
- RPG (Team): United States (50.5)
- APG (Team): United States (23.1)

The women's basketball tournament at the 2012 Olympic Games in London began on 28 July and ended on 11 August. All preliminary and quarterfinal games were held at the Basketball Arena within the Olympic Park, and the semifinal and the medal games were held at the North Greenwich Arena (renamed from The O2 Arena due to the no commercialization policy).

== Qualification ==
Means of qualification	Date	Venue	Berths	Qualified
Host nation	6 July 2005		1	Great Britain
2010 FIBA World Championship	23 September – 3 October 2010	Czech Republic	1	United States
2011 FIBA Europe Championship	18 June – 3 July 2011	Poland	1	Russia
2011 FIBA Asia Championship	21–28 August 2011	Japan	1	China
2011 FIBA Oceania Championship	7–11 September 2011	Australia	1	Australia
2011 FIBA Americas Championship	24 September – 1 October 2011	Colombia	1	Brazil
2011 FIBA Africa Championship	23 September – 2 October 2011	Mali	1	Angola
2012 FIBA World Olympic Qualifying Tournament	25 June – 1 July 2012	Turkey	5	Turkey; Croatia; Czech Republic; France; Canada
Total			12	

== Squads ==
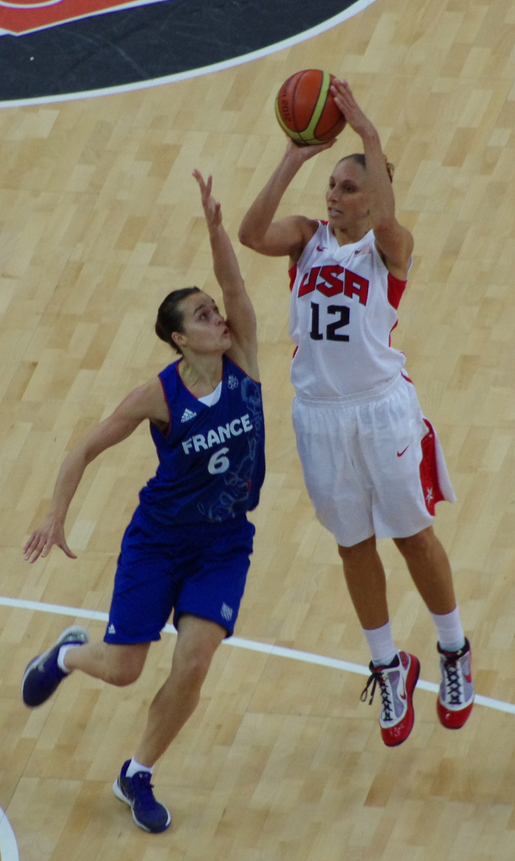
Olympics 2012 finale, Diana Taurasi (USA) and Clémence Beikes (France)

== Competition format ==
Twelve qualified nations were drawn into two groups, each consisting of six teams. Each game result merits a corresponding point:

Result	Points
Win	2
Loss	1
Loss via default*	1
Loss via forfeiture**	0

*The team has less than two players available to play on the court.
**A team cannot present five players at the start of the game, or its actions prevent play from being resumed.

In case teams are tied on points, the tiebreaking criteria are, in order of first application:

1. Results of the games involving the tied teams (head-to-head records)
2. Goal average of the games involving the tied teams
3. Goal average of all of the games played
4. Points scored
5. Drawing of lots

The teams with the four best records qualified for the knockout stage, which was a single-elimination tournament. The semifinal winners contested for the gold medal, while the losers played for the bronze medal.

== Preliminary round ==
All times are British Summer Time (UTC+1).

=== Group A ===
Pos	Team	Pld	W	L	PF	PA	PD	Pts	Qualification
1	United States	5	5	0	462	279	+183	10	Quarterfinals
2	Turkey	5	4	1	343	316	+27	9	Quarterfinals
3	China	5	3	2	346	363	−17	8	Quarterfinals
4	Czech Republic	5	2	3	346	332	+14	7	Quarterfinals
5	Croatia	5	1	4	324	379	−55	6	
6	Angola	5	0	5	243	395	−152	5	

Source: FIBA archive
Rules for classification: 1) points; 2) head-to-head points; 3) head-to-head goal average; 4) head-to-head number of points scored.

28 July 2012
09:00

Report

China	66–57	Czech Republic
Scoring by quarter: 20–16, 16–13, 15–15, 15–13
Pts: Ma Zengyu 16; Rebs: Chen Nan 8 Asts: Miao Lijie 8		Pts: Vítečková 14; Rebs: Horáková 9 Asts: three players 3

Basketball Arena, London
Referees: Jorge Vazquez (PUR), Vaughan Mayberry (AUS), Carole Delaune (FRA)

28 July 2012
14:30

Report

Turkey	72–50	Angola
Scoring by quarter: 21–8, 14–17, 23–14, 14–11
Pts: Palazoğlu 13; Rebs: Çağlar 7 Asts: Vardarlı 5		Pts: Mauricio 11; Rebs: Tomas, Manuel 5 Asts: Camufal 2

Basketball Arena, London
Referees: Elena Chernova (RUS), Vitalis Gode (KEN), Fernando Sampietro (ARG)

28 July 2012
16:45

Report

United States	81–56	Croatia
Scoring by quarter: 11–4, 20–24, 22–19, 28–9
Pts: Charles 14; Rebs: Parker 13; Asts: Bird 5		Pts: Ivezić 22; Rebs: Ivanković 7 Asts: Lelas 5

Basketball Arena, London
Referees: Juan Arteaga (ESP), Oļegs Latiševs (LAT), Snehal Bendke (IND)

30 July 2012
09:00

Report

Croatia	58–83	China
Scoring by quarter: 21–24, 10–15, 14–25, 13–19
Pts: Mandir 22; Rebs: Ivezić 6 Asts: Jelavić, Lelas 4		Pts: Chen Nan 28; Rebs: Chen Nan 10; Asts: Miao Lijie 10

Basketball Arena, London
Referees: Michael Aylen (AUS), Elena Chernova (RUS), Felicia Grinter (USA)

30 July 2012
11:15

Report

Czech Republic	57–61	Turkey
Scoring by quarter: 8–13, 13–20, 18–12, 18–16
Pts: Veselá 19; Rebs: three players 6 Asts: Bartoňová, Elhotová 4		Pts: three players 11; Rebs: Yılmaz 13; Asts: Vardarlı 4

Basketball Arena, London
Referees: Pablo Estévez (ARG), Shoko Sugruro (JPN), Samir Abaakil (MAR)

30 July 2012
22:15

Report

Angola	38–90	United States
Scoring by quarter: 12–22, 6–19, 11–28, 9–21
Pts: Guadalupe 11; Rebs: Mauricio, Manuel 6 Asts: Manuel 2		Pts: Parker 14; Rebs: Parker 12; Asts: Bird 5

Basketball Arena, London
Referees: Carole Delauné (FRA), Marcos Benito (BRA), Robert Lottermoser (GER)

1 August 2012
11:15

Report

China	76–52	Angola
Scoring by quarter: 15–13, 18–18, 24–6, 19–15
Pts: Ma Zengyu 15; Rebs: Gao Song 9 Asts: Miao Lijie 5		Pts: Guadalupe 12; Rebs: Tomas 9 Asts: three players 2

Basketball Arena, London
Referees: Christos Christodoulou (GRE), Samir Abaakil (MAR), Shenal Bendke (IND)

1 August 2012
20:00

Report

Croatia	70–89	Czech Republic
Scoring by quarter: 19–22, 20–23, 21–12, 10–32
Pts: Mandir 20; Rebs: Mandir 6 Asts: Mandir 3		Pts: Elhotová 20; Rebs: Horáková 10; Asts: Veselá 7

Basketball Arena, London
Referees: Cristiano Maranho (BRA), Guerrino Cerebuch (ITA), Carole Delauné (FRA)

1 August 2012
22:15

Report

United States	89–58	Turkey
Scoring by quarter: 19–16, 22–10, 22–21, 26–11
Pts: McCoughtry 18; Rebs: three players 7 Asts: Bird 4		Pts: Vardarlı, Hollingsworth 11; Rebs: Hollingsworth 8 Asts: Vardarlı, Alben 3

Basketball Arena, London
Referees: Michael Aylen (AUS), Stephen Seibel (CAN), Peng Ling (CHN)

3 August 2012
09:00

Report

Angola	56–75	Croatia
Scoring by quarter: 18–24, 14–17, 11–18, 13–16
Pts: Tomas 15; Rebs: Mauricio, Tomas 8 Asts: Mauricio 4		Pts: Lelas 23; Rebs: Ivanković 7 Asts: Mandir 5

Basketball Arena, London
Referees: Stephen Seibel (CAN), Shoko Sugruro (JPN), Peng Ling (CHN)

3 August 2012
16:45

Report

Turkey	82–55	China
Scoring by quarter: 26–13, 13–14, 20–16, 23–12
Pts: Yılmaz 16; Rebs: Hollingsworth 11; Asts: Alben 5		Pts: Ma Zengyu 7 Rebs: Ma Zengyu, Chen Nan 8 Asts: Miao Lijie 6

Basketball Arena, London
Referees: Carl Jungebrand (FIN), Felicia Grinter (USA), Vaughan Mayberry (AUS)

3 August 2012
22:15

Report

Czech Republic	61–88	United States
Scoring by quarter: 26–24, 12–24, 9–22, 14–18
Pts: Zrůstová 15; Rebs: Pecková 6 Asts: Bartoňová 3		Pts: Taurasi 18; Rebs: Charles 14; Asts: Bird 9

Basketball Arena, London
Referees: Elena Chernova (RUS), Marcos Benito (BRA), Vitalis Gode (KEN)

5 August 2012
11:15

Report

Angola	47–82	Czech Republic
Scoring by quarter: 18–23, 7–17, 10–18, 12–24
Pts: Mauricio 18; Rebs: Manuel 12; Asts: Eusébio, Guadalupe 2		Pts: Zrůstová 20; Rebs: Horáková 9 Asts: Elhotová 4

Basketball Arena, London
Referees: Rabah Noujaim (LIB), Vaughan Mayberry (AUS), Vitalis Gode (KEN)

5 August 2012
16:45

Report

China	66–114	United States
Scoring by quarter: 28–31, 8–30, 12–33, 18–20
Pts: Song Xiaoyun 15; Rebs: four players 3 Asts: Miao Lijie 8		Pts: Taurasi 22; Rebs: Moore 7 Asts: Catchings 7

Basketball Arena, London
Referees: Guerrino Cerebuch (ITA), Borys Ryschyk (UKR), Carole Delauné (FRA)

5 August 2012
20:00

Report

Croatia	65–70	Turkey
Scoring by quarter: 24–18, 7–15, 13–25, 21–12
Pts: Lelas 14; Rebs: Lelas, Mandir 6 Asts: Lelas 5		Pts: Hollingsworth 14; Rebs: Yılmaz 9 Asts: Tunçluer, Vardarlı 5

Basketball Arena, London
Referees: Jorge Vázquez (PUR), Marcos Benito (BRA), Elena Chernova (RUS)

=== Group B ===
Pos	Team	Pld	W	L	PF	PA	PD	Pts	Qualification
1	France	5	5	0	356	319	+37	10	Quarterfinals
2	Australia	5	4	1	353	322	+31	9	Quarterfinals
3	Russia	5	3	2	314	308	+6	8	Quarterfinals
4	Canada	5	2	3	328	332	−4	7	Quarterfinals
5	Brazil	5	1	4	329	354	−25	6	
6	Great Britain (H)	5	0	5	327	372	−45	5	

Source: [ FIBA archive]
Rules for classification: 1) points; 2) head-to-head points; 3) head-to-head goal average; 4) head-to-head number of points scored.
(H) Hosts

28 July 2012
11:15

Report

Canada	53–58	Russia
Scoring by quarter: 17–15, 13–9, 13–13, 10–21
Pts: Smith 20; Rebs: T. Tatham 5 Asts: Thorburn 6		Pts: Hammon 14; Rebs: Osipova 12; Asts: Danilochkina 6

Basketball Arena, London
Referees: Recep Ankaralı (TUR), Peng Ling (CHN), Samir Abaakil (MAR)

28 July 2012
20:00

Report

Brazil	58–73	France
Scoring by quarter: 20–16, 14–18, 15–18, 9–21
Pts: de Souza 17; Rebs: Santos 12; Asts: Pinto 5		Pts: Dumerc 23; Rebs: Miyem 7 Asts: Dumerc 5

Basketball Arena, London
Referees: Robert Lottermoser (GER), Rabah Noujaim (LIB), Felicia Grinter (USA)

28 July 2012
22:15

Report

Australia	74–58	Great Britain
Scoring by quarter: 16–11, 23–15, 18–16, 17–16
Pts: Jackson 18; Rebs: Batkovic 7 Asts: Richards 4		Pts: Vanderwal, Leedham 11; Rebs: Page 7 Asts: Stafford, Leedham 3

Basketball Arena, London
Referees: Jorge Carrion (PUR), Shoko Sugruro (JPN), Borys Ryschyk (UKR)

30 July 2012
14:30

Report

France	74–70 (OT)	Australia
Scoring by quarter: 11–14, 17–13, 24–24, 13–14, Overtime: 9–5
Pts: Gomis 22; Rebs: Yacoubou 7 Asts: Beikes, Dumerc 2		Pts: Batkovic 17; Rebs: Batkovic 10; Asts: O'Hea 5

Basketball Arena, London
Referees: William Kennedy (USA), Christos Christodoulou (GRE), Peng Ling (CHN)

30 July 2012
16:45

Report

Russia	69–59	Brazil
Scoring by quarter: 19–18, 12–8, 18–17, 20–16
Pts: Belyakova 14; Rebs: Grishaeva 8 Asts: three players 3		Pts: de Souza 15; Rebs: de Souza 18; Asts: Costa 4

Basketball Arena, London
Referees: Guerrino Cerebuch (ITA), Ilija Belošević (SRB), Snehal Bendke (IND)

30 July 2012
20:00

Report

Great Britain	65–73	Canada
Scoring by quarter: 15–19, 17–17, 21–19, 12–18
Pts: Stafford, Leedham 15; Rebs: Fagbenle 6 Asts: Collins 4		Pts: Thorburn 18; Rebs: Pilypaitis, T. Tatham 5 Asts: Gabriele 7

Basketball Arena, London
Referees: Juan Arteaga (ESP), Saša Pukl (SLO), Vitalis Gode (KEN)

1 August 2012
09:00

Report

Canada	60–64	France
Scoring by quarter: 12–13, 13–15, 15–14, 20–22
Pts: Thorburn 17; Rebs: Achonwa 8 Asts: Thorburn 3		Pts: Gomis 16; Rebs: Gruda 6 Asts: three players 3

Basketball Arena, London
Referees: Luigi Lamonica (ITA), Pablo Estévez (ARG), Shoko Suguro (JPN)

1 August 2012
14:30

Report

Australia	67–61	Brazil
Scoring by quarter: 15–10, 16–8, 20–22, 16–21
Pts: Jackson 18; Rebs: Cambage 10; Asts: Harrower 5		Pts: Costa 22; Rebs: Dantas 10; Asts: Costa 3

Basketball Arena, London
Referees: Recep Ankarali (TUR), Carl Jungebrand (FIN), Vitalis Gode (KEN)

1 August 2012
16:45

Report

Great Britain	61–67	Russia
Scoring by quarter: 14–16, 13–23, 18–13, 16–15
Pts: Stafford 18; Rebs: Page 7 Asts: Collins, Leedham 3		Pts: Belyakova 12; Rebs: Osipova 9 Asts: Hammon 6

Basketball Arena, London
Referees: Felicia Grinter (USA), Rabah Noujaim (LIB), Jorge Vázquez (PUR)

3 August 2012
11:15

Report

Russia	66–70	Australia
Scoring by quarter: 15–21, 15–11, 18–22, 18–16
Pts: Osipova 15; Rebs: Osipova 9 Asts: Danilochkina 4		Pts: Cambage 17; Rebs: Cambage 10; Asts: O'Hea, Harrower 5

Basketball Arena, London
Referees: Cristiano Maranho (BRA), Fernando Sampietro (ARG), Robert Lottermoser (GER)

3 August 2012
14:30

Report

Brazil	73–79	Canada
Scoring by quarter: 8–18, 17–21, 28–16, 20–24
Pts: de Souza 22; Rebs: Rodrigues 4 Asts: de Souza 12		Pts: Pilypaitis, Smith 14; Rebs: Thorburn 8 Asts: Smith 5

Basketball Arena, London
Referees: José Carrion (PUR), Borys Ryschyk (UKR), Carole Delauné (FRA)

3 August 2012
20:00

Report

France	80–77 (OT)	Great Britain
Scoring by quarter: 10–13, 17–10, 20–21, 20–23, Overtime: 13–10
Pts: Gruda, Lawson-Wade 16; Rebs: Godin 8 Asts: Godin 4		Pts: Leedham 29; Rebs: Page, Leedham 8 Asts: Page 3

Basketball Arena, London
Referees: Ilija Belošević (SRB), Oļegs Latiševs (LAT), Snehal Bendke (IND)

5 August 2012
09:00

Report

France	65–54	Russia
Scoring by quarter: 10–15, 15–6, 30–13, 10–20
Pts: Dumerc 12; Rebs: Yacoubou, Beikes 7 Asts: Dumerc 3		Pts: Belyakova 14; Rebs: Hammon, Osipova 5 Asts: Danilochkina, Osipova 3

Basketball Arena, London
Referees: Pablo Estévez (ARG), Saša Pukl (SLO), Shoko Sugruro (JPN)

5 August 2012
14:30

Report

Canada	63–72	Australia
Scoring by quarter: 10–24, 12–11, 20–12, 21–25
Pts: Smith 17; Rebs: Murphy 5 Asts: Thorburn 5		Pts: Snell 12; Rebs: Jackson 9 Asts: Screen, Harrower 4

Basketball Arena, London
Referees: Felicia Grinter (USA), Oļegs Latiševs (LAT), Snehal Bendke (IND)

5 August 2012
22:15

Report

Great Britain	66–78	Brazil
Scoring by quarter: 19–19, 17–20, 17–25, 13–14
Pts: Stafford 15; Rebs: Stafford 10; Asts: Stafford 4		Pts: Santos 16; Rebs: Santos 13; Asts: Pinto 12

Basketball Arena, London
Referees: Christos Christodoulou (GRE), William Kennedy (USA), Peng Ling (CHN)

== Knockout round ==
Quarter-finals
A1	United States	91
B4	Canada	48
B2	Australia	75
A3	China	60
B1	France	71
A4	Czech Republic	68
A2	Turkey	63
B3	Russia	66

Semi-finals
A1	United States	86
B2	Australia	73
B1	France	81
B3	Russia	64

Gold medal match
A1	United States	86
B1	France	50
Bronze medal match
B2	Australia	83
B3	Russia	74

=== Quarterfinals ===
7 August 2012
14:00

Report

United States	91–48	Canada
Scoring by quarter: 19–8, 23–13, 26–10, 23–17
Pts: Taurasi 15; Rebs: Moore, Parker 7 Asts: Bird 5		Pts: Smith 13; Rebs: Phillips 8 Asts: Phillips 5

Basketball Arena, London
Referees: Guerrino Cerebuch (ITA), Shoko Sugruro (JPN), Vitalis Gode (KEN)

7 August 2012
16:15

Report

Australia	75–60	China
Scoring by quarter: 22–16, 13–20, 20–16, 20–8
Pts: Cambage 17; Rebs: Batkovic 9 Asts: Richards 7		Pts: Ma Zengyu 15; Rebs: Chen Nan 7 Asts: Gao Song 3

Basketball Arena, London
Referees: Oļegs Latiševs (LAT), Elena Chernova (RUS), Carole Delauné (FRA)

7 August 2012
20:00

Report

Turkey	63–66	Russia
Scoring by quarter: 16–23, 12–11, 23–17, 12–15
Pts: Hollingsworth 22; Rebs: Alben 6 Asts: Vardarlı 6		Pts: Hammon 19; Rebs: Petrakova 7 Asts: Hammon 5

Basketball Arena, London
Referees: José Carrion (PUR), William Kennedy (USA), Peng Ling (CHN)

7 August 2012
22:15

Report

France	71–68	Czech Republic
Scoring by quarter: 16–12, 12–16, 13–23, 30–17
Pts: Dumerc 23; Rebs: Gruda 7 Asts: Dumerc 6		Pts: Vítečková 17; Rebs: Horáková 7 Asts: Horáková 5

Basketball Arena, London
Referees: Marcos Benito (BRA), Felicia Grinter (USA), Rabah Noujaim (LIB)

=== Semifinals ===
9 August 2012
17:00

Report

Australia	73–86	United States
Scoring by quarter: 22–20, 25–23, 12–22, 14–21
Pts: Cambage 19; Rebs: Jackson 17; Asts: Jarry 5		Pts: Taurasi, Charles 14; Rebs: Charles 10; Asts: Charles 4

North Greenwich Arena, London
Referees: Ilija Belošević (SRB), Borys Ryschyk (UKR), Snehal Bendke (IND)

9 August 2012
21:00

Report

Russia	64–81	France
Scoring by quarter: 15–24, 16–14, 20–21, 13–22
Pts: Danilochkina, Hammon 13; Rebs: Vieru 8 Asts: Hammon 5		Pts: Lawson-Wade 18; Rebs: Gruda 8 Asts: Lawson-Wade 5

North Greenwich Arena, London
Referees: Guerrino Cerebuch (ITA), Jorge Vázquez (PUR), Stephen Seibel (CAN)

=== Bronze medal game ===
11 August 2012
17:00

Report

(bronze) Australia	83–74	Russia
Scoring by quarter: 17–16, 21–14, 19–13, 26–31
Pts: Jackson 25; Rebs: Jackson 11; Asts: O'Hea 5		Pts: Hammon 19; Rebs: Vodopyanova 8 Asts: Hammon 4

North Greenwich Arena, London
Referees: Jorge Vázquez (PUR), Felicia Grinter (USA), Shoko Sugruro (JPN)

=== Gold medal game ===
11 August 2012
21:00

Report

(gold) United States	86–50	France (silver)
Scoring by quarter: 20–15, 17–10, 26–12, 23–13
Pts: Parker 21; Rebs: Parker 11; Asts: Taurasi 6		Pts: Gruda, Lawson-Wade 12; Rebs: Ndongue 8 Asts: Dumerc 3

North Greenwich Arena, London
Referees: Fernando Sampietro (ARG), Elena Chernova (RUS), Peng Ling (CHN)

== Awards ==
2012 Women's Olympic Basketball Champions

United States
Seventh title

== Statistical leaders ==
=== Individual tournament highs ===
Points
Pos.	Name	G	Pts	PPG
1	(Brazil) Érika de Souza	5	81	16.2
1	(United Kingdom) Jo Leedham	5	81	16.2
3	(Australia) Lauren Jackson	8	127	15.9
4	(China) Chen Nan	6	94	15.7
5	(United Kingdom) Natalie Stafford	5	78	15.6
6	(Czech Republic) Eva Vítečková	6	91	15.2
7	(France) Céline Dumerc	8	114	14.3
8	(Croatia) Sandra Mandir	5	70	14.0
9	(Canada) Kim Smith	6	83	13.8
10	(Australia) Liz Cambage	8	109	13.6

Rebounds
Pos.	Name	G	Reb.	RPG
1	(Brazil) Clarissa dos Santos	5	45	9.0
2	(Brazil) Érika de Souza	5	44	8.8
3	(Australia) Lauren Jackson	8	63	7.9
4	(United States) Candace Parker	8	62	7.8
5	(United States) Tina Charles	8	59	7.4
6	(Turkey) Nevriye Yılmaz	6	43	7.2
7	(Angola) Nadir Manuel	5	35	7.0
8	(Russia) Irina Osipova	8	54	6.8
9	(China) Chen Nan	6	41	6.8
9	(Czech Republic) Hana Horáková	6	40	6.7

Assists
Pos.	Name	G	Ass.	APG
1	(China) Miao Lijie	6	39	6.5
2	(United States) Sue Bird	8	36	4.5
2	(Canada) Shona Thorburn	6	27	4.5
2	(Turkey) Birsel Vardarlı	6	27	4.5
5	(Brazil) Adriana Pinto	5	22	4.4
6	(Russia) Becky Hammon	8	32	4.0
7	(Australia) Jenna O'Hea	8	28	3.5
8	(France) Céline Dumerc	8	27	3.4
9	(Croatia) Ana Lelas	5	16	3.2
9	(Brazil) Joice Rodrigues	5	16	3.2

Blocks
Pos.	Name	G	Blocks	BPG
1	(France) Sandrine Gruda	8	17	2.1
2	(Czech Republic) Ilona Burgrová	6	10	1.7
3	(Australia) Liz Cambage	8	13	1.6
3	(Brazil) Érika de Souza	5	8	1.6
5	(Croatia) Luca Ivanković	5	7	1.4
5	(United Kingdom) Azania Stewart	5	7	1.4
7	(United States) Candace Parker	8	10	1.3
8	(United Kingdom) Temi Fagbenle	5	6	1.2
9	(Russia) Irina Osipova	8	9	1.1
10	(Czech Republic) Petra Kulichová	6	6	1.0

Steals
Pos.	Name	G	Stls	SPG
1	(Croatia) Jelena Ivezić	5	14	2.8
2	(United States) Angel McCoughtry	8	20	2.5
3	(United Kingdom) Jo Leedham	5	12	2.4
4	(Czech Republic) Hana Horáková	6	12	2.0
5	(Turkey) Işıl Alben	6	11	1.8
6	(United States) Tamika Catchings	8	13	1.6
6	(France) Céline Dumerc	8	13	1.6
8	(United States) Maya Moore	8	12	1.5
8	(Turkey) Nevriye Yılmaz	6	9	1.5
10	(Brazil) Joice Rodrigues	5	7	1.4

=== Team tournament highs ===
Offensive PPG
Pos.	Name	PPG
1	United States	90.6
2	Australia	73.0
3	France	69.8
4	Czech Republic	69.0
5	China	67.7
5	Turkey	67.7

Rebounds
Pos.	Name	RPG
1	United States	50.5
2	Australia	42.1
3	Russia	40.4
4	Czech Republic	40.0
5	Great Britain	39.4

Assists
Pos.	Name	APG
1	United States	23.1
2	China	17.7
3	Australia	17.6
4	Czech Republic	17.2
5	Turkey	17.0

Steals
Pos.	Name	SPG
1	United States	10.5
2	Great Britain	8.8
3	Turkey	8.5
4	Australia	6.9
5	Brazil	6.8

Blocks
Pos.	Name	BPG
1	United States	5.1
2	France	5.0
3	Russia	4.9
4	Czech Republic	4.5
5	Australia	4.0

== See also ==
- Men's Tournament
