= EuroBasket Women 2007 =

2007 edition of EuroBasket Women

EuroBasket 2007 Women
31st FIBA European Women's Basketball Championship
- Official logo of the Women EuroBasket 2007

Tournament details
- Host country: Italy
- Dates: September 24 – October 7
- Teams: 16 (from 49 federations)
- Venues: 5 (in 4 host cities)

Final positions
- Champions: Russia (2nd title)
- Runners-up: Spain
- Third place: Belarus
- Fourth place: Latvia

Tournament statistics
- Attendance: 6,986
- MVP: (Spain) Amaya Valdemoro
- Top scorer: (Belgium) Wauters 19.7
- Top rebounds: (Russia) Stepanova 10.0
- Top assists: (France) Lawson-Wade 4.3
- PPG (Team): Russia 71.2
- RPG (Team): Russia 45.8
- APG (Team): Czech Republic 14.1

Official website
- EuroBasket Women 2007

The 2007 European Women Basketball Championship, commonly called EuroBasket Women 2007, was the 31st regional championship held by FIBA Europe. The competition was held in Italy and took place from September 24, 2007 to October 7, 2007. Russia won the gold medal and Spain the silver medal while Belarus won the bronze. Amaya Valdemoro from Spain was named the tournament MVP.

== Preliminary round ==
Times given below are in Central European Summer Time (UTC+2).

=== Group A ===
Team	Pts.	W	L	PCT	PF	PA	Diff
Czech Republic	6	3	0	1.000	231	149	+82
Latvia	5	2	1	0.667	194	205	−11
Turkey	4	1	2	0.333	194	217	−23
Israel	3	0	3	0.000	174	222	−48

September 24
18:30

Turkey	62–73	Latvia
Scoring by quarter: 18–18, 14–20, 17–21, 13–14

Vasto
Attendance: 500
Referees: Chantal Julien(FRA), Miguel Anguel Perez Niz(ESP), Jasmina Tatic (SRB)

September 24
21:00

Israel	43–75	Czech Republic
Scoring by quarter: 11–17, 13–18, 7–19, 12–21

Vasto
Attendance: 500
Referees: Guerrino Cerebuch(ITA), Aleksander Gorshkov(RUS), Ademir Zurapovic (BIH)

September 25
18:30

Latvia	77–73	Israel
Scoring by quarter: 17–12, 13–27, 23–18, 24–16

Vasto
Attendance: 600
Referees: Chantal Julien(FRA), Aleksander Gorshkov(RUS), Jasmina Tatic (SRB)

September 25
21:00

Czech Republic	86–62	Turkey
Scoring by quarter: 20–13, 19–10, 29–19, 18–20

Vasto
Attendance: 600
Referees: Guerrino Cerebuch(ITA), Fedor Dmitriev(BLR), Ademir Zurapovic (BIH)

September 26
18:30

Israel	58–70	Turkey
Scoring by quarter: 18–17, 23–26, 4–18, 13–9

Vasto
Attendance: 600
Referees: Guerrino Cerebuch(ITA), Chantal Julien(FRA), Ademir Zurapovic (BIH)

September 26
21:00

Latvia	44–70	Czech Republic
Scoring by quarter: 11–15, 13–22, 9–17, 11–16

Vasto
Attendance: 600
Referees: Aleksander Gorshkov(RUS), Miguel Anguel Perez Niz(ESP), Fedor Dmitriev (BLR)

=== Group B ===
Team	Pts.	W	L	PCT	PF	PA	Diff
Belgium	6	3	0	1.000	203	177	+26
Lithuania	5	2	1	0.667	191	175	+16
Germany	4	1	2	0.333	195	210	−15
Romania	3	0	3	0.000	199	226	−27

September 24
18:00

Romania	78–85	Germany
Scoring by quarter: 19–25, 21–17, 19–26, 19–17

Lanciano
Attendance: 200
Referees: Davorin Nakic(CRO), David Chambon(FRA), Elena Chernova (RUS)

September 24
20:30

Belgium	68–53	Lithuania
Scoring by quarter: 21–9, 11–10, 25–16, 11–18

Lanciano
Attendance: 300
Referees: Gianluca Mattioli(ITA), Milija Vojinovic(SRB), Maria Argirou (GRE)

September 25
18:00

Germany	53–61	Belgium
Scoring by quarter: 10–18, 12–15, 18–15, 13–13

Lanciano
Attendance: 300
Referees: Konstantinos Koromilas(GRE), Milija Vojinovic(SRB), Gianluca Mattioli (ITA)

September 25
20:30

Lithuania	67–50	Romania
Scoring by quarter: 24–16, 11–11, 15–11, 17–12

Lanciano
Attendance: 200
Referees: Davorin Nakic(CRO), David Chambon(FRA), Maria Argirou (GRE)

September 26
18:00

Belgium	74–71	Romania
Scoring by quarter: 20–23, 16–19, 23–16, 15–13

Lanciano
Attendance: 200
Referees: Konstantinos Koromilas(GRE), Gianluca Mattioli (ITA), Elena Chernova (RUS)

September 26
20:30

Germany	57–71	Lithuania
Scoring by quarter: 18–20, 16–16, 13–15, 10–20

Lanciano
Attendance: 300
Referees: Davorin Nakic(CRO), David Chambon (FRA), Milija Vojinovic (SRB)

=== Group C ===
Team	Pts.	W	L	PCT	PF	PA	Diff
Russia	6	3	0	1.000	209	161	+48
France	5	2	1	0.667	181	161	+20
Italy	4	1	2	0.333	168	179	−11
Greece	3	0	3	0.000	152	209	−57

September 24
15:30

Italy	55–60	Russia
Scoring by quarter: 18–22, 13–12, 8–8, 16–18

Chieti
Attendance: 2000
Referees: Robert Lottermoser(GER), Oskars Lucis(LAT), Marius Ciulin (ROU)

September 24
18:00

France	58–50	Greece
Scoring by quarter: 17–13, 10–6, 13–13, 18–18

Chieti
Attendance: 1000
Referees: Péter Bodnár(HUN), Tomas Jasevicius(LTU), Vladimir Tsekov (BUL)

September 25
15:30

Greece	55–65	Italy
Scoring by quarter: 13–21, 14–15, 10–13, 18–16

Chieti
Attendance: 2000
Referees: Vaclav Lukes(CZE), Péter Bodnár(HUN), Tomas Jasevicius(LTU)

September 25
18:00

Russia	63–59	France
Scoring by quarter: 21–13, 18–15, 13–13, 11–18

Chieti
Attendance: 1500
Referees: Marius Ciulin (ROU), Oskars Lucis(LAT), Robert Lottermoser(GER)

September 26
15:30

Italy	48–64	France
Scoring by quarter: 6–11, 10–17, 19–11, 13–25

Chieti
Attendance: 2300
Referees: Robert Lottermoser(GER), Marius Ciulin (ROU), Tomas Jasevicius(LTU)

September 26
18:00

Greece	47–86	Russia
Scoring by quarter: 13–29, 9–15, 12–21, 13–21

Chieti
Attendance: 1000
Referees: Vaclav Lukes(CZE), Oskars Lucis (LAT), Vladimir Tsekov(BUL)

=== Group D ===
Team	Pts.	W	L	PCT	PF	PA	Diff
Spain	6	3	0	1.000	218	190	+28
Belarus	5	2	1	0.667	233	195	+38
Serbia	4	1	2	0.333	217	228	−11
Croatia	3	0	3	0.000	188	243	−55

September 24
18:00

Belarus	62–76	Spain
Scoring by quarter: 12–17, 15–23, 24–20, 11–16

Ortona

September 24
20:30

Serbia	88–70	Croatia
Scoring by quarter: 16–21, 22–19, 24–16, 26–14

Ortona

September 25
18:00

Croatia	66–92	Belarus
Scoring by quarter: 11–18, 14–26, 18–24, 23–24

Ortona

September 25
20:30

Spain	79–76	Serbia
Scoring by quarter: 21–17, 22–19, 17–18, 19–22

Ortona

September 26
18:00

Belarus	79–53	Serbia
Scoring by quarter: 21–16, 22–20, 17–11, 19–6

Ortona

September 26
20:30

Croatia	52–63	Spain
Scoring by quarter: 9–14, 18–15, 19–17, 6–17

Ortona

== Qualifying round ==
Qualified for the quarterfinals

=== Group E ===
Team	Pts.	W	L	PCT	PF	PA	Diff
Czech Republic	9	4	1	0.800	350	297	+53
Latvia	9	4	1	0.800	322	291	+31
Belgium	8	3	2	0.600	350	310	+40
Lithuania	7	2	3	0.400	304	337	−33
Turkey	6	1	4	0.200	324	374	−50
Germany	6	1	4	0.200	274	315	−41

September 28
16:00

Turkey	63–85	Belgium
Scoring by quarter: 10–29, 16–20, 20–23, 17–13

Vasto
Attendance: 700
Referees: Seffi Shemmesh (ISR), David Chambon(FRA), Elena Chernova(RUS)

September 28
18:30

Lithuania	46–76	Latvia
Scoring by quarter: 9–15, 14–20, 11–22, 12–19

Vasto
Attendance: 700
Referees: Konstantinos Koromilas (GRE), Ademir Zurapovic(BIH), Gianluca Mattioli(ITA)

September 28
21:00

Germany	54–47	Czech Republic
Scoring by quarter: 17–14, 8–12, 13–12, 16–9

Vasto
Attendance: 700
Referees: Guerrino Cerebuch (ITA), Miguel Anguel Perez Niz(ESP), Jasmina Tatic(SRB)

September 30
16:00

Germany	63–76	Turkey
Scoring by quarter: 15–22, 13–22, 13–16, 22–16

Vasto
Attendance: 700
Referees: Aleksander Gorshkov (RUS), Fedor Dmitriev(BLR), Karolina Andersson(FIN)

September 30
18:30

Czech Republic	75–67	Lithuania
Scoring by quarter: 19–24, 16–21, 21–11, 19–11

Vasto
Attendance: 700
Referees: Chantal Julien (FRA), Marius Ciulin(ROM), Vladimir Tsekov(BUL)

September 30
21:00

Latvia	69–66	Belgium
Scoring by quarter: 11–18, 15–10, 28–16, 15–22

Vasto
Attendance: 700
Referees: Milija Vojinovic (SRB), Gianluca Mattioli(ITA), David Chambon(FRA)

October 2
16:00

Lithuania	67–61	Turkey
Scoring by quarter: 16–15, 18–15, 13–19, 20–12

Vasto
Attendance: 600
Referees: Aleksander Gorshkov (RUS), Miguel Anguel Perez Niz (ESP), Péter Bodnár (HUN)

October 2
18:30

Belgium	70–72	Czech Republic
Scoring by quarter: 21–19, 17–16, 20–23, 12–14

Vasto
Attendance: 600
Referees: Chantal Julien (FRA), Marius Ciulin (ROM), Jasmina Tatic (SRB)

October 2
21:00

Latvia	60–47	Germany
Scoring by quarter: 23–13, 9–19, 17–5, 12–10

Vasto
Attendance: 600
Referees: Guerrino Cerebuch (ITA), Milija Vojinovic (SRB), Maria Argirou (GRE)

Qualified for the quarterfinals

=== Group F ===
Team	Pts.	W	L	PCT	PF	PA	Diff
Russia	9	4	1	0.800	339	303	+36
Spain	9	4	1	0.800	346	319	+27
France	8	3	2	0.600	316	294	+22
Belarus	7	2	3	0.400	340	339	+1
Italy	6	2	4	0.200	282	312	−30
Serbia	6	2	4	0.200	299	355	−56

September 29
15:30

Italy	64–79	Spain
Scoring by quarter: 18–25, 14–22, 15–16, 17–16

Ortona
Attendance: 1000
Referees: Marcin Kowalski (POL), Emin Mogulkoc(TUR), Robert Lottermoser(GER)

September 29
18:30

Serbia	67–65	Russia
Scoring by quarter: 25–17, 11–13, 11–14, 20–21

Ortona
Attendance: 1000
Referees: Vaclav Lukes (CZE), Tomas Jasevicius(LTU), Vincent Delestrée(BEL)

September 29
21:00

Belarus	60–72	France
Scoring by quarter: 18–15, 15–26, 16–12, 11–19

Ortona
Attendance: 1000
Referees: Davorin Nakic (CRO), Lahdo Sharro(SWE), Petra Kremer(GER)

October 1
15:30

Serbia	43–64	Italy
Scoring by quarter: 12–17, 8–14, 13–16, 10–17

Ortona
Attendance: 1000
Referees: Seffi Shemmesh (ISR), Lahdo Sharro(SWE), Oskars Lucis(LAT)

October 1
18:30

Russia	87–73	Belarus
Scoring by quarter: 24–15, 17–16, 27–9, 19–33

Ortona
Attendance: 1000
Referees: Konstantinos Koromilas (GRE), Davorin Nakic(CRO), Marcin Kowalski(POL)

October 1
21:00

France	53–63	Spain
Scoring by quarter: 9–13, 20–16, 17–11, 7–23

Ortona
Attendance: 1000
Referees: Ademir Zurapovic (BIH), Robert Lottermoser(GER), Tomas Jasevicius(LTU)

October 3
15:30

Belarus	66–51	Italy
Scoring by quarter: 19–15, 19–15, 12–8, 16–13

Ortona
Attendance: 1000
Referees: Konstantinos Koromilas (GRE), Vaclav Lukes(CZE), Emin Mogulkoc(TUR)

October 3
18:30

Spain	49–64	Russia
Scoring by quarter: 13–16, 9–8, 20–21, 7–19

Ortona
Attendance: 1000
Referees: Seffi Shemmesh (ISR), Lahdo Sharro(SWE), Petra Kremer(GER)

October 3
21:00

France	68–60	Serbia
Scoring by quarter: 18–23, 21–11, 17–13, 12–13

Ortona
Attendance: 1000
Referees: Martin Kowalski (POL), Vincent Delestrée(BEL), Karolina Andersson(SWE)

== Knockout stage ==
=== Championship bracket ===
Quarter-finals
October 4, 2007 – Chieti
Czech Republic	46
Belarus	52
October 5, 2007 – Chieti
Belgium	53
Spain	72
October 4, 2007 – Chieti
Latvia	66
France	62
October 5, 2007 – Chieti
Lithuania	58
Russia	75

Semi-finals
October 6, 2007 – Chieti
Belarus	54
Spain	70
October 6, 2007 – Chieti
Latvia	36
Russia	67

Final
October 7, 2007 – Chieti
Spain	68
Russia	74
Third place
October 7, 2007 – Chieti
Belarus	72
Latvia	63

=== 5th place bracket ===
Semi-finals
October 6, 2007 – Chieti
Czech Republic	75
Belgium	50
October 6, 2007 – Chieti
France	65
Lithuania	67

Fifth place
October 7, 2007 – Chieti
Czech Republic	93
Lithuania	54
Seventh place
October 7, 2007 – Chieti
Belgium	72
France	63

=== Quarterfinals ===
October 4
18:30

Latvia	66–62	France
Scoring by quarter: 13–10, 15–8, 16–22, 22–22
Pts: Basko 17; Rebs: Tamane, Jansone 8 Asts: Basko 6		Pts: Gruda 14; Rebs: Le Dréan, Gruda, Sauret-Gillespie, Yacoubou 5 Asts: Sauret-Gillespie 6

Chieti
Attendance: 700
Referees: Gianluca Mattioli (ITA), Milija Vojinovic(SRB), Marius Ciulin(ROM)

October 4
21:00

Czech Republic	46–52	Belarus
Scoring by quarter: 15–11, 12–20, 14–8, 5–13
Pts: Veselá 11; Rebs: Machová, Kulichová 8 Asts: Veselá, Machová, Vitecková 2		Pts: Leuchanka, Marchanka 11; Rebs: Veremeenko 7 Asts: Kress 2

Chieti
Referees: Miguel Anguel Perez Niz (ESP), Tomas Jasevicius (LTU), Vladimir Tsekov (BUL)

October 5
18:30

Lithuania	58–75	Russia
Scoring by quarter: 25–21, 12–14, 15–24, 6–16
Pts: Marcauskaité 14; Rebs: Marcauskaité 7 Asts: Valuzyte 4		Pts: Arteshina 17; Rebs: Osipova 10; Asts: Rakhmatulina, Korstin, Osipova 3

Chieti
Attendance: 1000
Referees: Davorin Nakic (CRO), Robert Lottermoser (GER), Jasmina Tatic (SRB)

October 5
21:00

Belgium	53–72	Spain
Scoring by quarter: 20–18, 11–14, 13–22, 9–18
Pts: Wauters 19; Rebs: Wauters 10; Asts: De Mondt 3		Pts: Valdemoro 19; Rebs: Montañana, Pascua 7 Asts: Aguilar, Palau, Martinez 2

Chieti
Attendance: 1000
Referees: Guerrino Cerebuch (ITA), Ademir Zurapovic (BIH), Oskars Lucis (LAT)

=== Classification rounds ===
October 6
13:30

Classif. 5–8

France	65–67	Lithuania
Scoring by quarter: 14–13, 19–14, 24–23, 8–17
Pts: Yacoubou 15; Rebs: Dijon, Yacoubou 6 Asts: Lawson-Wade 9		Pts: Sulciute 21; Rebs: Valuzyte 10; Asts: Valuzyte 6

Chieti
Attendance: 800
Referees: Guerrino Cerebuch (ITA), Seffi Shemmesh (ISR), Elena Chernova (RUS)

October 6
16:00

Classif. 5–8

Czech Republic	75–50	Belgium
Pts: Uhrová 15; Rebs: Hartigová 10; Asts: Vitecková 4		Pts: Wauters 17; Rebs: Wauters 6 Asts: Carpréaux, Wambe 3

Chieti
Attendance: 800
Referees: Gianluca Mattioli (ITA), Fedor Dmitriev (BLR), Petra Kremer (GER)

October 7
12:15

7th place

Belgium	72–63	France
Scoring by quarter: 18–19, 14–9, 15–19, 25–16
Pts: Wauters 25; Rebs: Wauters 8 Asts: Wambe, De Mondt, Wauters 3		Pts: Gruda 23; Rebs: Ndongue 9 Asts: Lawson-Wade 4

Chieti
Attendance: 500
Referees: Aleksander Gorshkov (RUS), Tomas Jasevicius (LTU), Karolina Andersson (FIN)

October 7
14:30

5th place

Czech Republic	93–54	Lithuania
Scoring by quarter: 28–12, 21–6, 17–18, 27–18
Pts: Vitecková 16; Rebs: Hartigová, Vitecková 6 Asts: Vecerová, Vitecková 4		Pts: Egle Sulciute 10; Rebs: Marcauskaité 6 Asts: Marcauskaité 2

Chieti
Attendance: 500
Referees: Chantal Julien (FRA), Miguel Anguel Perez Niz (ESP), Marcin Kowalski (POL)

=== Semifinals ===
October 6
18:30

Latvia	36–67	Russia
Scoring by quarter: 17–16, 4–11, 8–20, 7–20
Pts: Jēkabsone-Žogota 18; Rebs: Kublina 10; Asts: Eglite 3		Pts: Arteshina 16; Rebs: Osipova 12; Asts: Rakhmatulina, Stepanova 2

Chieti
Attendance: 1000
Referees: Konstantinos Koromilas (GRE), Vaclav Lukes (CZE), Lahdo Sharro (SWE)

October 6
21:00

Belarus	54–70	Spain
Pts: Troina 10; Rebs: Veremeenko 11; Asts: Padabed 3		Pts: Montañana 14; Rebs: Pascua 8 Asts: Montañana 4

Chieti
Attendance: 1000
Referees: Milija Vojinovic (SRB), Marius Ciulin (ROM), Emin Mogulkoc (TUR)

=== Third place game ===
October 7
17:00

Belarus	72–63	Latvia
Scoring by quarter: 16–17, 16–7, 23–13, 17–26
Pts: Veremeenko 15; Rebs: Leuchanka 9 Asts: Marchanka 7		Pts: Jansone 23; Rebs: Jansone 7 Asts: Kublina 4

Chieti
Attendance: 1500
Referees: Davorin Nakic (CRO), Gianluca Mattioli (ITA), Elena Chernova (RUS)

=== Final ===
October 7
19:30

Spain	68–74	Russia
Scoring by quarter: 13–23, 11–21, 21–9, 23–21
Pts: Valdemoro 26; Rebs: Valdemoro 8 Asts: Lima, Palau 3		Pts: Korstin 18; Rebs: Stepanova 10; Asts: Rakhmatulina 5

Chieti
Attendance: 2900
Referees: Konstantinos Koromilas (GRE), Guerrino Cerebuch (ITA), Jasmina Tatic (SRB)

Eurobasket Women 2007 champion

Russia
Second title

Eurobasket Women 2007 MVP: Amaya Valdemoro (Spain)

All EuroBasket Women 2007 team:

- Amaya Valdemoro (Spain)
- Anete Jēkabsone-Žogota(Latvia)
- Natallia Marchanka (Belarus)
- Maria Stepanova (Russia)
- Olga Arteshina (Russia)

== Final standings ==
Place	Team
1	Russia
2	Spain
3	Belarus
4	Latvia
5	Czech Republic
6	Lithuania
7	Belgium
8	France
9–10	Italy
9–10	Turkey
11-12	Germany
11-12	Serbia
13–16	Israel
13–16	Romania
13–16	Greece
13–16	Croatia

== Olympic qualification ==
The team qualified directly to Beijing 2008:

- Russia

The following four teams have assured a place in the Olympic qualifying tournament:

- Spain
- Belarus
- Latvia
- Czech Republic
