= Hala Torbyd =

Indoor arena in Bydgoszcz, Poland

- Location: Bydgoszcz, Poland
- Capacity: 10,000

Construction
- Opened: 1959
- Demolished: 1993

Tenant
- Polonia Bydgoszcz

Hala Torbyd was an indoor arena in Bydgoszcz, Poland. It was primarily used for basketball and ice hockey and was the home of Polonia Bydgoszcz of the Polish ice hockey league. The arena held 10,000 spectators and opened in 1959. Eventually, the Łuczniczka was opened in 2002 to replace the Hala Torbyd.
