= Basketball in the Czech Republic =

Basketball in the Czech Republic is organized by Czech Basketball Federation (ČBF) (Czech: Česká basketbalová federace).

The top professional Czech basketball league is Mattoni National Basketball League (Czech: Mattoni Národní basketbalová liga). Participating in the competition are 12 clubs and the season lasts 9 months. The current champion is ERA Basketball Nymburk (season 2021/2022). The Czech basketball champion participates in FIBA Europe EuroCup, against top teams in FIBA Europe EuroCup Challenge.

The top women's Czech basketball league is Women's Basketball League (Czech: Ženská basketbalová liga). There are 10 teams participating in this competition. Current women's champion is ZVVZ USK Praha (season 2021/2022). Two best teams participate in FIBA Europe Euroleague Women. Gambrinus Brno has won this competition in 2006. Other top teams participate in FIBA Europe EuroCup Women.

The Czech teams also compete in a domestic cup competition each year.

== Others Competitions ==
- Czech Cup in men's basketball
- Czech Cup in women's basketball

== See also ==
- Czech national basketball team
- Czech Republic women's national basketball team
