= Erin Lawless =

American-born Slovak basketball player

Personal information
- Born: May 6, 1985 (age 41) Chicago, Illinois
- Listed height: 6 ft 2 in (1.88 m)

Career information
- High school: Fenwick (Oak Park, Illinois)
- College: Purdue (2003–2007)
- Playing career: 2007–2015
- Position: Forward

Career history
- 2007–2008: New Wash Montigarda
- 2009: Prešov
- 2009–2012: Good Angels Košice
- 2012–2013: Dynamo Kursk
- 2013–2014: Ceyhan
- 2014–2015: BC Namur-Capitale

Career highlights
- Big Ten All-Freshman Team (2004); McDonald's All-American (2003)

Erin Lawless (born May 6, 1985), also known as Erin Lawlessová, is an American born-Slovak women's basketball player. She played for Slovakia at EuroBasket Women 2011, where she was her nation's top scorer. She played club basketball in Italy, Slovakia, Russia, Turkey and Belgium between 2007 and 2015, before returning to the United States.

== Basketball career ==
Lawless signed a letter of intent with Purdue in 2002, having played basketball for Fenwick High School.

Lawless played basketball in Italy's Serie A1 with New Wash Montigarda in the 2007–08 season, leading the team in scoring. She then signed with the Indiana Fever of the WNBA in early 2008, making it her second training camp with the team.

Lawless subsequently moved to Slovakia to play in the Slovak Women's Basketball Extraliga for Prešov and then Good Angels Košice. In 2010 she received Slovak citizenship, enabling her to represent Slovakia in international competition, despite not being able to speak the Slovak language. She played three matches for Slovakia at EuroBasket Women 2011, leading the individual scoring with a total of 34 points. Slovakia won one and lost two matches in the group stage, ending their tournament.

After spending some time in the Russian league with Dynamo Kursk, Lawless joined Turkish side Ceyhan in 2013. In September 2014 Lawless joined Belgian side BC Namur-Capitale, but fractured her thumb shortly after her arrival. Her contract with Namur was terminated in February 2015, with Lawless pregnant, and she returned to the United States.

=== Purdue statistics ===
Legend
GP	Games played	GS	Games started	MPG	Minutes per game
FG%	Field goal percentage	3P%	3-point field goal percentage	FT%	Free throw percentage
RPG	Rebounds per game	APG	Assists per game	SPG	Steals per game
BPG	Blocks per game	PPG	Points per game	**Bold**	Career high

Year	Team	GP	Points	FG%	3P%	FT%	RPG	APG	SPG	BPG	PPG
2003–04	Purdue	33	236	**48.4%**	37.5%	66.7%	3.5	0.5	0.5	0.3	7.2
2004–05	Purdue	30	**425**	47.1%	36.6%	**80.3%**	5.3	1.0	1.0	0.4	**14.2**
2005–06	Purdue	33	339	46.0%	29.4%	77.7%	4.3	0.9	1.1	0.3	10.3
2006–07	Purdue	**37**	375	45.9%	**39.0%**	80.1%	**5.7**	**1.6**	**1.1**	**0.6**	10.1
Career		133	1375	46.7%	35.6%	77.2%	4.7	1.0	0.9	0.4	10.3
