= Iva Perovanović =

Montenegrin basketball player

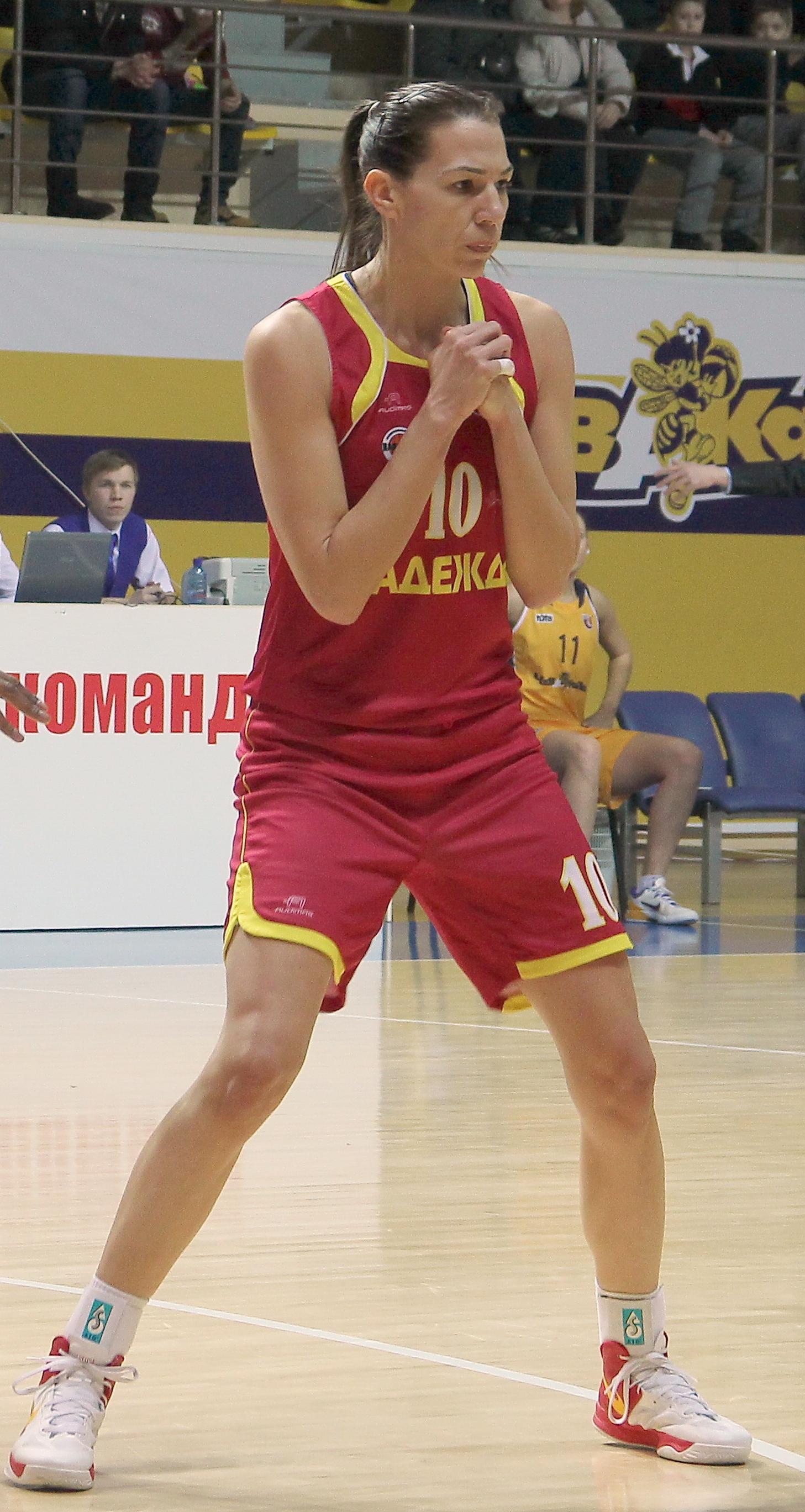
- Perovanović in 2012

Personal information
- Born: 1 September 1983 (age 43) Titograd, SFR Yugoslavia
- Listed height: 6 ft 2 in (1.88 m)

Career information
- WNBA draft: 2005: undrafted
- Playing career: 2002–present
- Position: Center

Career history
- 2002–2004: Budućnost Podgorica
- 2004–2006: Wisła Kraków
- 2006–2008: Budućnost Podgorica
- 2008: Umbertide
- 2008–2009: Islas Canarias
- 2009–2010: Olesa
- 2010–2011: Lattes
- 2011–2012: Polkowice
- 2012–2013: Nadezhda Orenburg
- 2013–2014: Beşiktaş JK
- 2014–2015: Orduspor
- 2015–2016: Canik Belediyespor
- 2016–2018: Beşiktaş JK

Iva Perovanović (born 1 September 1983) was a Montenegrin female basketball player of Montenegrin national team. She last played for Beşiktaş JK. She competed in the 2011 Eurobasket.
