= Clémence Beikes =

French basketball player

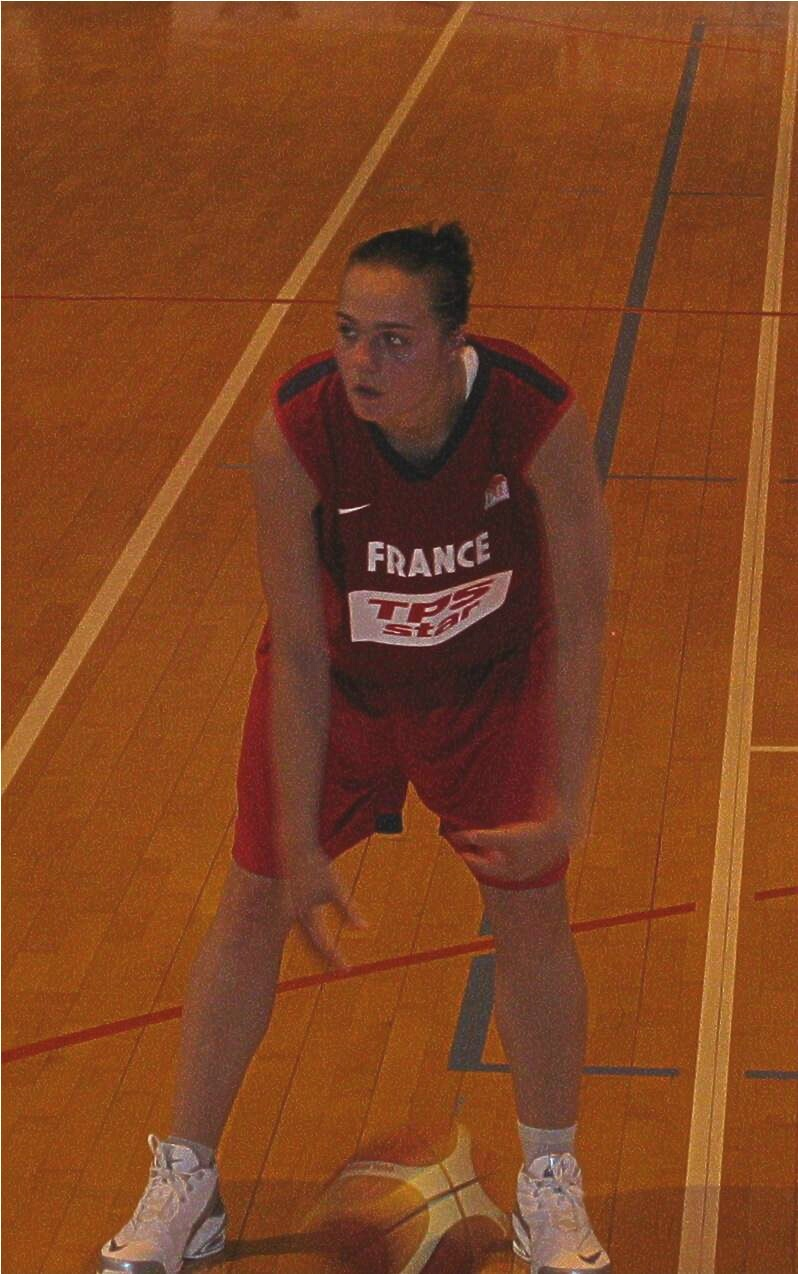

Medal record

Women's basketball

Representing France

Olympic Games
Silver medal – second place	2012 London	Team

EuroBasket
Bronze medal – third place	2011 Poland	Team

Clémence Beikes (born 18 October 1983 in Grande-Synthe) is a French female professional basketball player. She plays for France women's national basketball team. She competed at the 2012 Summer Olympics, winning a silver medal. She is 1.80 m (5 ft 11 in) tall.

== Biography ==
A French NF1 champion with Saint-Amand—the club she remained with despite its administrative relegation the previous year—she was called up by the national team coach to join the 12-player roster for the 2010 World Cup. France finished in sixth place.

At Euro 2011, she won the bronze medal, and then the silver medal at the 2012 Olympic Games.

She announced her intention to retire from sports in the summer of 2013due to a knee injury that prevented her from returning to competition. In March, she announced her retirement from sports.
