= Aušra Bimbaitė =

Lithuanian basketball player (born 1982)

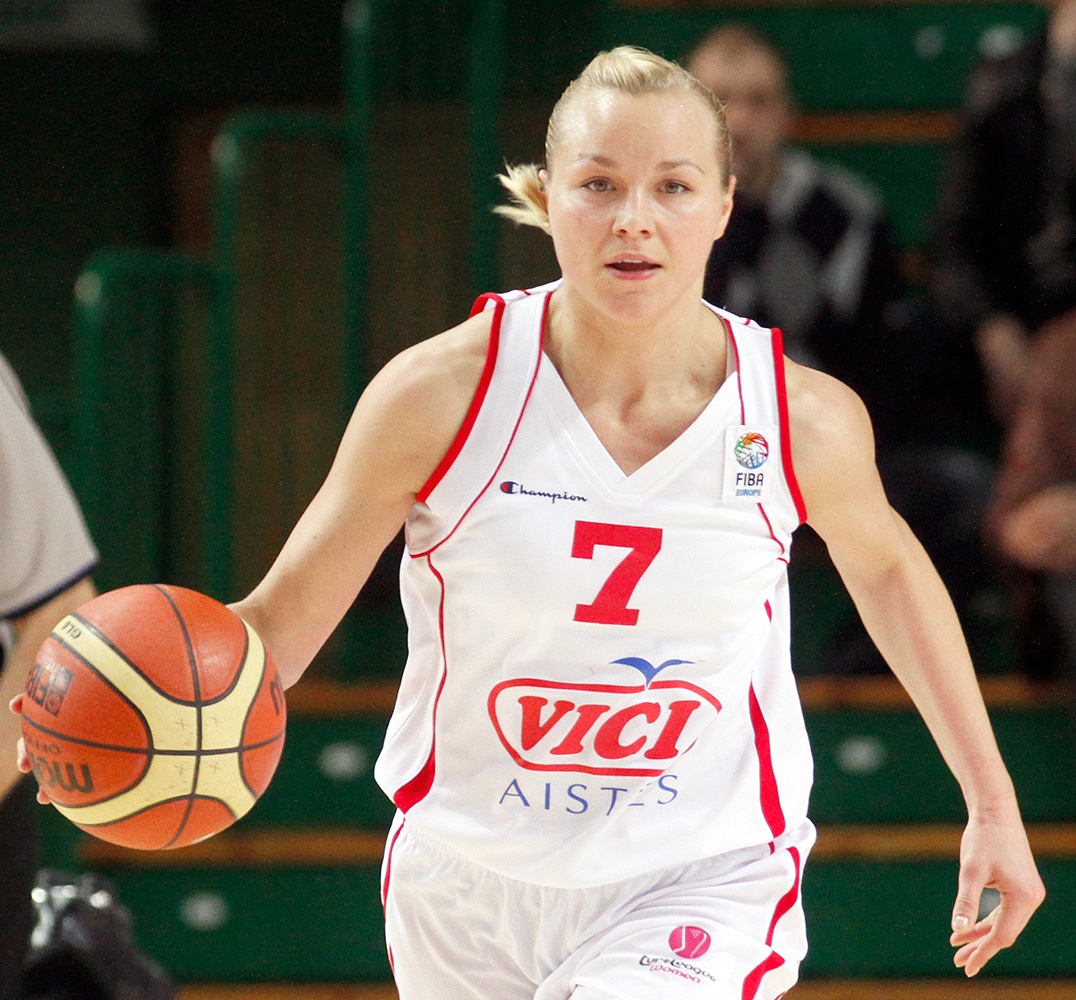

Personal information
- Born: October 10, 1982 (age 44) Rokiškis, Lithuanian SSR, Soviet Union
- Listed height: 179 cm (5 ft 10 in)
- Listed weight: 67 kg (148 lb)
- Position: Shooting guard

Career history
- 2001-2009: Vilniaus Teo
- 2009-2010: Dynamo Kursk
- 2010-2011: VIČI-Aistės Kaunas
- 2011-2013: Dynamo Kursk

Aušra Bimbaitė (born October 10, 1982) is a former Lithuanian professional basketball player. She played for Dynamo Kursk and Lithuania women's national basketball team. She has represented national team in several EuroBasket Women competitions. She has spent all her career in Lithuania, except 2009–10, and 2011–13 season when she played for Dynamo Kursk.
