= Elena Kirillova =

Russian basketball player

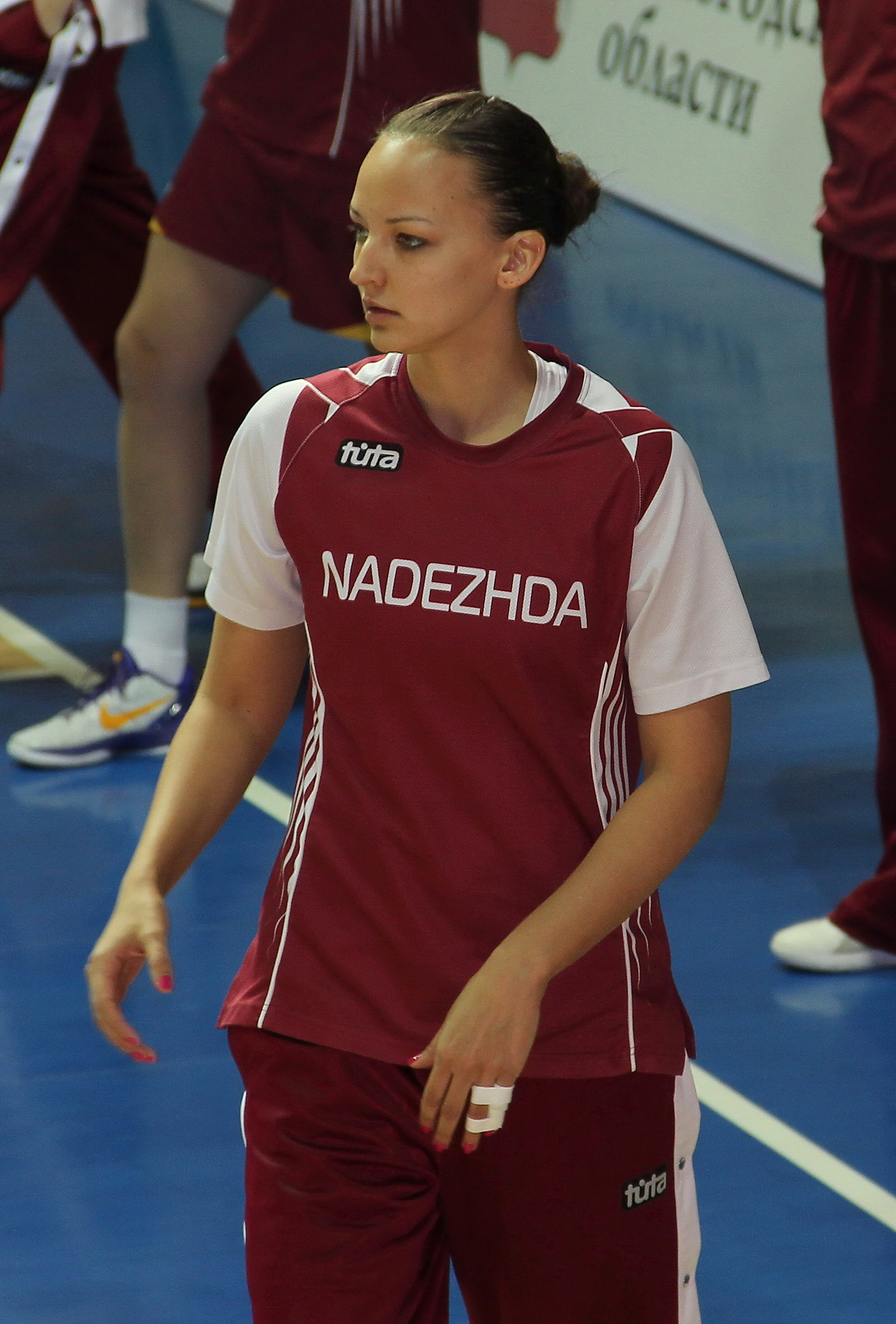
- Kirillova in 2012

No. 13 – Dynamo Kursk
- Position: Shooting guard
- League: RPL

Personal information
- Born: 27 January 1986 (age 40) Moscow, Russia
- Listed height: 6 ft 1 in (1.85 m)
- Listed weight: 154 lb (70 kg)

Career highlights
- Russian Best Young Player (2006)

Elena Igorevna Kirillova, (Russian: Елена Игоревна Данилочкина; born 27 January 1986), née Elena Danilochkina, (Russian: Елена Данилочкина) is a Russian basketball player. She played as a shooting guard for the Russian women's national team and Nadezhda Orenburg in the Russian Premier League. She then switched to Dynamo Kursk in 2016, winning with her team the EuroLeague in 2017.

Danilochkina led Russia to the gold medal at the EuroBasket Women 2011 and was voted the Most Valuable Player of the tournament. Her team placed fourth at the 2012 Summer Olympics.
