= Julie Page =

British basketball player

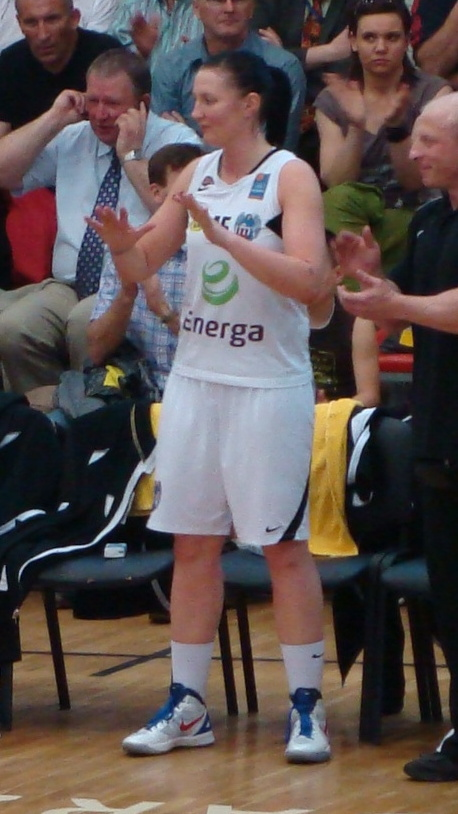

Julie Page (born 21 April 1983) is a basketball player for Great Britain women's national basketball team. She is 1.88 m (6 ft 2 in) tall and when playing weighed 90 kg and was part of the squad for the 2012 Summer Olympics.
