= Kateřina Bartoňová =

Czech basketball player

Piešťanské Čajky
- Position: Guard
- League: Slovak League

Personal information
- Born: 17 January 1990 (age 36) Pardubice, Czechoslovakia
- Listed height: 5 ft 8 in (1.73 m)

Kateřina Bartoňová (Czech pronunciation: [ˈkatɛr̝ɪna ˈbartoɲovaː]; born 17 January 1990) is a Czech professional basketball player. She plays for Czech Republic women's national basketball team. She competed in the 2012 Summer Olympics.
