= Lyudmila Sapova =

Russian basketball player

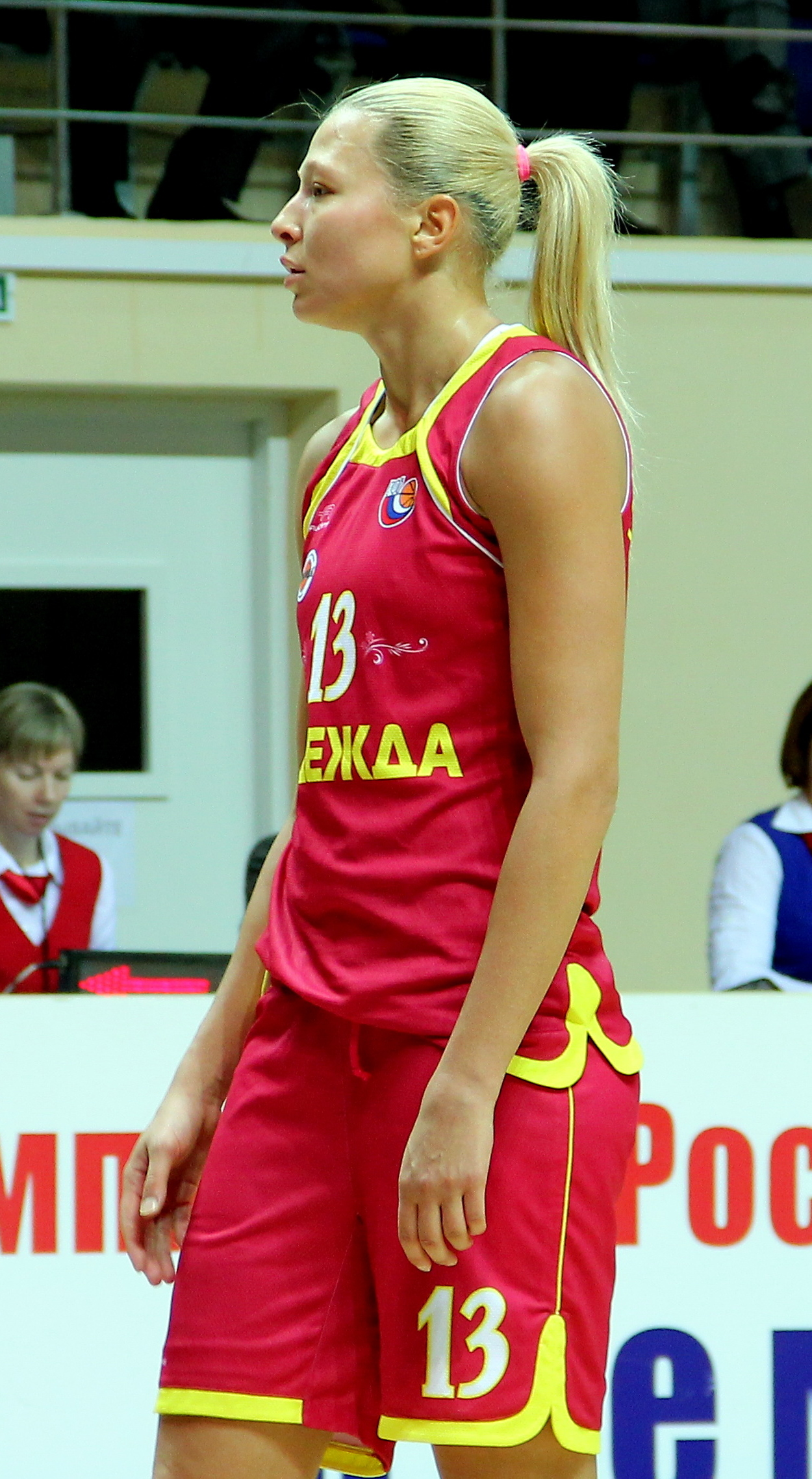
- Sapova in 2013

No. 14 – MBA Moscow
- Position: Small forward
- League: Russian Premier League

Personal information
- Born: 3 May 1984 (age 42) Moscow, USSR
- Listed height: 185 cm (6 ft 1 in)
- Listed weight: 74 kg (163 lb)

Career information
- WNBA draft: 2006: undrafted
- Playing career: 2001–present

Career history
- 2001–2002: Spartak Moscow
- 2002–2007: Dynamo Moscow
- 2007–2008: Chevakata Vologda
- 2008–2009: CSKA Moscow
- 2009–2010: AZS PWSZ Gorzów
- 2010–2013: Nadezhda Orenburg
- 2013–2014: Chevakata Vologda
- 2014–2016: Dynamo Kursk
- 2016–2017: Nadezhda Orenburg
- 2017–present: MBA Moscow
Medals
Women's basketball
Representing Russia
European Championships
Gold medal – first place	2011 Poland	Team

Lyudmila Vladimirovna Sapova (Russian: Людмила Владимировна Сапова; born 3 May 1984) is a Russian basketball small forward. She was part of the Russian team that won the 2011 European Championships. At the club level her team Dynamo Kursk placed third at the 2014–15 EuroLeague.
