= Ilona Burgrová =

Czech basketball player

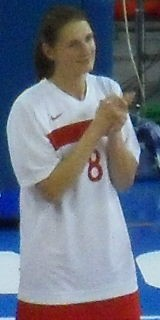

No. 8 – USK Praha
- Position: Center
- League: ŽBL

Personal information
- Born: 15 March 1984 (age 42) Hradec Králové, Czechoslovakia
- Listed height: 6 ft 4 in (1.93 m)
- Listed weight: 192 lb (87 kg)

Ilona Burgrová (Czech pronunciation: [ˈɪlona ˈburɡrovaː]; born 15 March 1984) is a Czech professional basketball player. She plays for Czech Republic women's national basketball team. She competed at the 2012 Summer Olympics.

== South Carolina statistics ==
Legend
GP	Games played	GS	Games started	MPG	Minutes per game
FG%	Field goal percentage	3P%	3-point field goal percentage	FT%	Free throw percentage
RPG	Rebounds per game	APG	Assists per game	SPG	Steals per game
BPG	Blocks per game	PPG	Points per game	**Bold**	Career high

Year	Team	GP	Points	FG%	3P%	FT%	RPG	APG	SPG	BPG	PPG
2004–05	South Carolina	29	174	39.9%	0.0%	65.7%	3.9	0.8	0.8	0.9	6.0
2005–06	South Carolina	29	148	49.6%		57.7%	4.3	0.9	0.5	**1.2**	5.1
2006–07	South Carolina	**33**	184	51.4%		50.7%	4.6	1.0	**0.8**	1.1	5.6
2007–08	South Carolina	32	**296**	**55.1%**		**69.0%**	**6.2**	**1.8**	0.8	1.2	**9.3**
Career	South Carolina	123	802	49.4%	0.0%	61.4%	4.8	1.1	0.8	1.1	6.5
