= Natalie Stafford =

British basketball player

Natalie Stafford is a basketball player for the Great Britain women's national basketball team. She was born on 8 December 1976 in Sydney, New South Wales, Australia. She was part of the squad for the 2012 Summer Olympics. Her height is 176 cm and weight is 66 kg. She has affiliated with the University of Sydney, New South Wales.
