= Czech Republic women's national basketball team =

Czech Republic
- FIBA ranking: 18 ▼1 (14 September 2026)
- Joined FIBA: 1993
- FIBA zone: FIBA Europe
- National federation: ČBF
- Coach: Martin Bašta

Olympic Games
- Appearances: 3

World Cup
- Appearances: 4
- Medals: (silver) Silver: (2010)

EuroBasket
- Appearances: 16
- Medals: (gold) Gold: (2005); (silver) Silver: (2003)
Home	Away
Medal record
Event	1st	2nd	3rd
Women's World Cup	0	1	0
EuroBasket Women	1	1	0
Total	1	2	0

The Czech Republic women's national basketball team represents the Czech Republic in international women's basketball. Their biggest success so far is the gold medal at the EuroBasket 2005. Czech Republic are one of the newest national basketball teams in the world, having split from the Czechoslovakia women's national basketball team after the dissolution of the unified state in 1993, with both countries continuing as the successor of the Czechoslovak team.

== Competition record ==
=== Olympic Games ===
Olympic Games					Qualifying		
Year	Position	Pld	W	L	Pld	W	L
(United States) 1996	Did not qualify						
(Australia) 2000	Did not qualify						
(Greece) 2004	5th	7	4	3			
(China) 2008	7th	6	2	4	3	3	0
(United Kingdom) 2012	7th	6	2	4	3	3	0
(Brazil) 2016	Did not qualify						
(Japan) 2020	Did not qualify						
(France) 2024	Did not qualify						
(United States) 2028	To be determined						
Total		19	8	11	6	6	0

=== FIBA Women's World Cup ===
Women's World Cup
Year	Position	Pld	W	L
(Australia) 1994	Did not qualify			
(Germany) 1998	Did not qualify			
(China) 2002	Did not qualify			
(Brazil) 2006	7th	9	5	4
(Czech Republic) 2010	Silver medal	9	6	3
(Turkey) 2014	9th	4	2	2
(Spain) 2018	Did not qualify			
(Australia) 2022	Did not qualify			
(Germany) 2026	15th	3	0	3
(Japan) 2030	To be determined			
Total		25	13	12

=== EuroBasket Women ===
EuroBasket Women					Qualification		
Year	Position	Pld	W	L	Pld	W	L
(Italy) 1993	Did not enter						
(Czech Republic) 1995	7th	9	5	4			
(Hungary) 1997	9th	7	2	5	5	4	1
(Poland) 1999	5th	8	5	3	5	5	0
(France) 2001	9th	5	1	4	6	4	2
(Greece) 2003	Silver medal	8	7	1			
(Turkey) 2005	Gold medal	8	8	0			
(Italy) 2007	5th	9	7	2			
(Latvia) 2009	9th	6	1	5			
(Poland) 2011	4th	9	6	3			
(France) 2013	6th	9	4	5			
(Hungary) (Romania) 2015	11th	7	3	4			
(Czech Republic) 2017	13th	3	1	2			
(Serbia) (Latvia) 2019	15th	3	1	2	4	4	0
(France) (Spain) 2021	15th	3	0	3	6	5	1
(Israel) (Slovenia) 2023	7th	6	3	3	4	4	0
(Czech Republic) (Germany) (Greece) (Italy) 2025	6th	6	3	3	Qualified as host		
(Belgium) (Finland) (Sweden) (Lithuania) 2027	To be determined				To be determined		
Total		106	57	49	30	26	4

== Current roster ==
Roster for 2026 FIBA Women's Basketball World Cup.

Czechia women's national basketball roster
Players
Coaches

Pos.	No.	Name	Age – Date of birth	Height	Club	Ctr.
PG	1	Kateřina Zeithammerová	24 – 17 April 2002	1.62 m (5 ft 4 in)	Žabiny Brno	(Czech Republic)
SF	2	Julie Pospíšilová	27 – 20 June 1999	1.83 m (6 ft 0 in)	Flammes Carolo Basket	(France)
C	3	Alena Hanušová	35 – 29 May 1991	1.90 m (6 ft 3 in)	DSK Brandýs	(Czech Republic)
SG	4	Gabriela Andělová	30 – 21 March 1996	1.73 m (5 ft 8 in)	USK Praha	(Czech Republic)
PF	5	Natálie Stoupalová (C)	28 – 13 July 1998	1.88 m (6 ft 2 in)	Žabiny Brno	(Czech Republic)
PG	7	Petra Malíková	23 – 9 September 2002	1.78 m (5 ft 10 in)	USK Praha	(Czech Republic)
SF	8	Veronika Voráčková	27 – 21 March 1999	1.87 m (6 ft 2 in)	Basket Zaragoza	(Spain)
PG	10	Eliška Joklová	24 – 1 October 2001	1.82 m (6 ft 0 in)	Minnesota Lynx	(United States)
PG	12	Monika Fučíková	24 – 23 March 2002	1.80 m (5 ft 11 in)	Žabiny Brno	(Czech Republic)
SG	13	Petra Holešínská	29 – 12 March 1997	1.78 m (5 ft 10 in)	Botaş SK	(Turkey)
C	16	Kateřina Kalná	19 – 21 March 2007	1.90 m (6 ft 3 in)	USK Praha	(Czech Republic)
F	20	Natálie Koucká	23 – 7 August 2003	1.93 m (6 ft 4 in)	USK Praha	(Czech Republic)

Head coach

- (Czech Republic) Romana Ptáčková

Assistant coach(es)

- (Czech Republic) Petr Treml

Legend

- (C) Team captain
- Club – describes last
  club before the tournament
- Age – describes age
  on 4 September 2026

== See also ==
- Czechoslovakia women's national basketball team
- Basketball in the Czech Republic
