= Sandra Linkevičienė =

Lithuanian basketball player

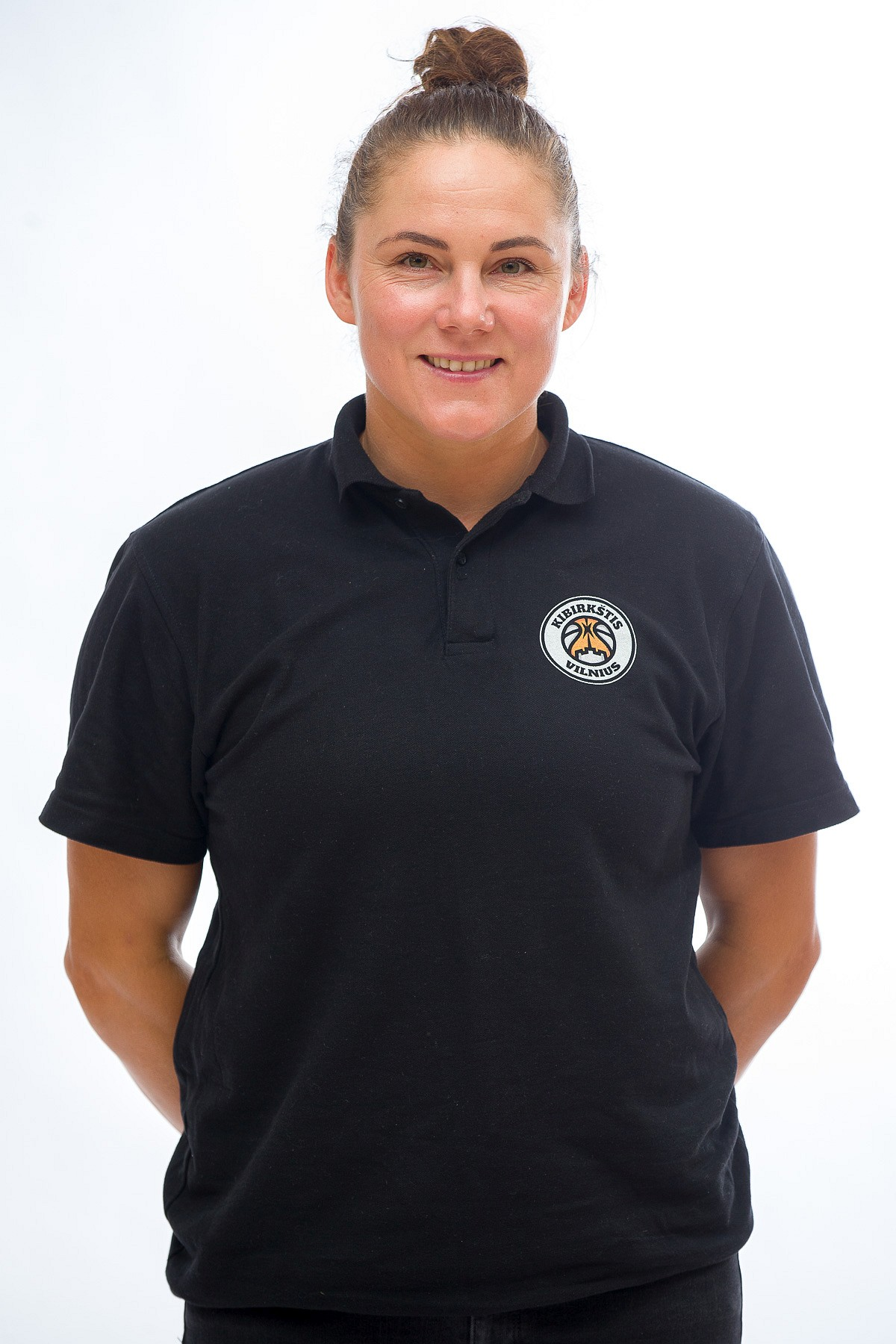
- Linkevičienė in 2021

Personal information
- Born: 1 February 1982 (age 44) Kretinga, Lithuanian SSR, Soviet Union
- Height: 176 cm (5 ft 9 in)

Sport
- Sport: Basketball
- Club: VIČI-Aistės Kaunas (1999–2008); Dynamo Kursk (2008–2011); UMMC Ekaterinburg (2011–2012)

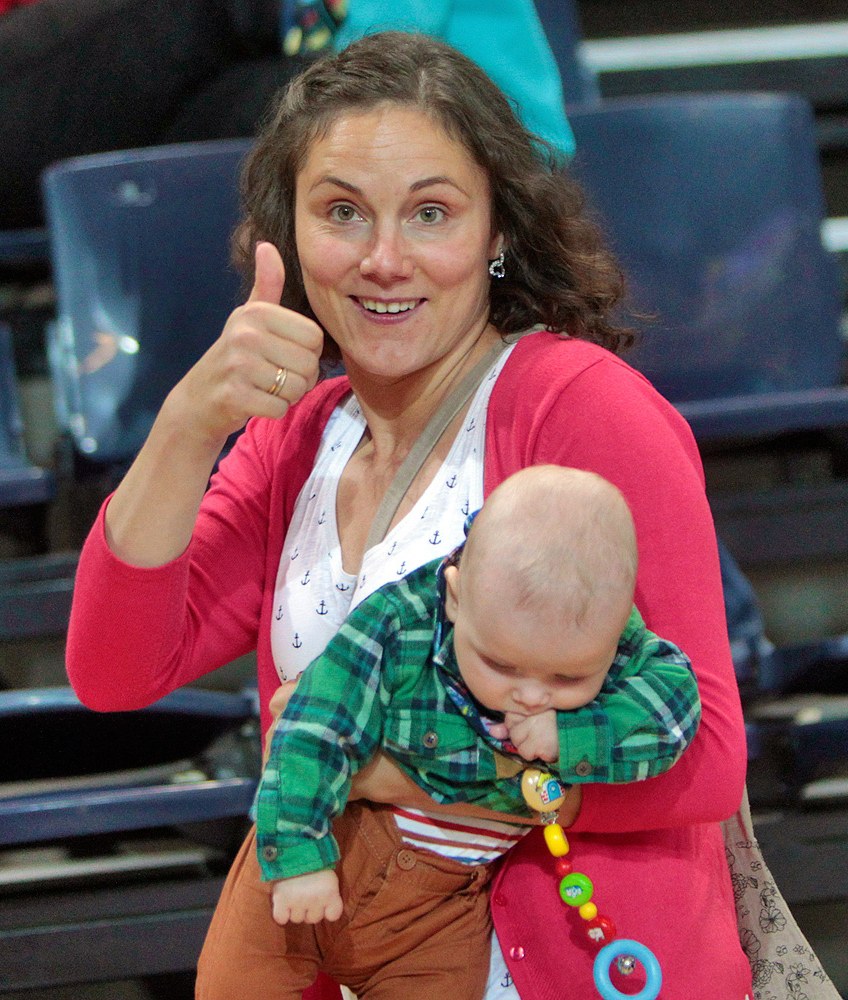
Sandra with her son in 2014

Sandra Linkevičienė (née Valužytė on 1 February 1982) is a Lithuanian basketball point guard. She won the Lithuanian title in 2000–2008 and the Russian title in 2012, and was voted as the Lithuanian basketball player of the year in 2010 and 2012. Internationally she won EuroLeague bronze medals in 2005 and 2012.

Linkevičienė changed her last name after marrying the association football player Vilius Linkevičius.
