= Natallia Marchanka =

Belarusian basketball player

Natallia Marchanka (born 19 May 1979) is a Belarusian basketball player who competed in the 2008 Summer Olympics.
