= Ieva Kubliņa =

Latvian basketball player

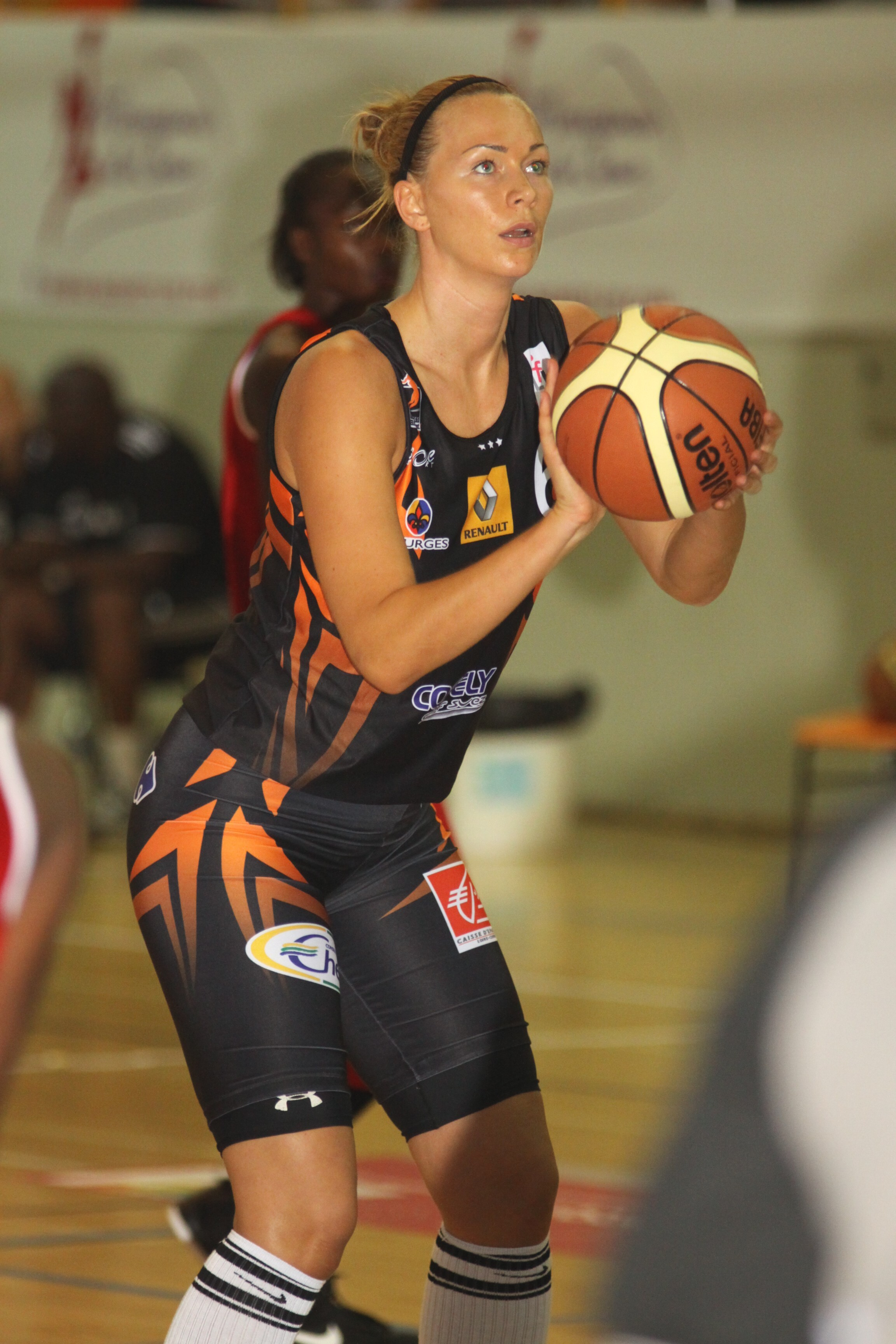

Personal information
- Born: 8 July 1982 (age 44) Riga, Latvia
- Listed height: 6 ft 4 in (1.93 m)
- Listed weight: 187 lb (85 kg)

Career information
- College: Virginia Tech (2000–2004)
- WNBA draft: 2004: 3rd round, 31st overall pick
- Drafted by: Indiana Fever
- Playing career: 1997–2014
- Position: Power forward / center
- Stats at Basketball Reference

Ieva Kubliņa (born 8 July 1982) is a Latvian women's basketball player. She last played in Euroleague Women for Turkish powerhouse Fenerbahçe Istanbul. She competed with Latvia women's national basketball team at the 2008 Summer Olympics, where she scored 47 points in 5 games, including 18 in a loss to South Korea. She played college basketball at Virginia Tech, in Blacksburg, VA. Her accomplishments led to her enshrinement in the Virginia Tech Sports Hall of Fame.

== Virginia Tech statistics ==
Ratios
Year	Team	GP	FG%	3P%	FT%	RBG	APG	BPG	SPG	PPG
2000-01	Virginia Tech	31	43.7%	34.2%	64.7%	5.00	0.50	1.10	0.40	7.80
2001-02	Virginia Tech	32	47.3%	37.7%	76.6%	7.78	0.94	2.69	0.72	15.56
2002-03	Virginia Tech	32	45.2%	35.4%	80.0%	7.44	1.38	1.94	0.94	15.03
2003-04	Virginia Tech	31	41.4%	26.9%	82.6%	6.58	0.84	2.36	0.74	13.74
Career		126	44.6%	32.9%	77.0%	6.71	0.91	2.03	0.69	13.07

Totals
Year	Team	GP	FG	FGA	3P	3PA	FT	FTA	REB	A	BK	ST	PTS
2000-01	Virginia Tech	31	87	199	13	38	55	85	154	15	35	11	242
2001-02	Virginia Tech	32	198	419	20	53	82	107	249	30	86	23	498
2002-03	Virginia Tech	32	173	383	23	65	112	140	238	44	62	30	481
2003-04	Virginia Tech	31	155	374	21	78	95	115	204	26	73	23	426
Career		126	613	1375	77	234	344	447	845	115	256	87	1647

== Career ==
- (Latvia) TTT Rapa (1997–00)
  - Latvian Championship: 1999
- (United States) Virginia Tech (2000–04)
- (Hungary) DKSK Miskolc (2004)
- (Lithuania) Lietuvos Telekomas (2004–06)
  - Lithuanian Championship: 2005, 2006
- (France) USO Mondeville (2006–07)
- (Russia) Dynamo Moscow (2007–08)
- (Latvia) TTT Riga (2008–09)
- (Czech Republic) USK Praha (2009–10)
- (Hungary) Seat Lami-Véd Győr (2010–11)
- (France) CJM Bourges Basket (2011–12)
  - Ligue Féminine de Basketball: 2012
- (Hungary) Seat Lami-Véd Győr (2012–13)
- (Turkey) Fenerbahçe Istanbul (2013)
  - Turkish Women's Basketball League: 2012–13
- (Hungary) PEAC-Pécs (2013–14)
