= Łuczniczka =

Arena in Bydgoszcz, Poland

Hala Sportowo-Widowiskowa Łuczniczka

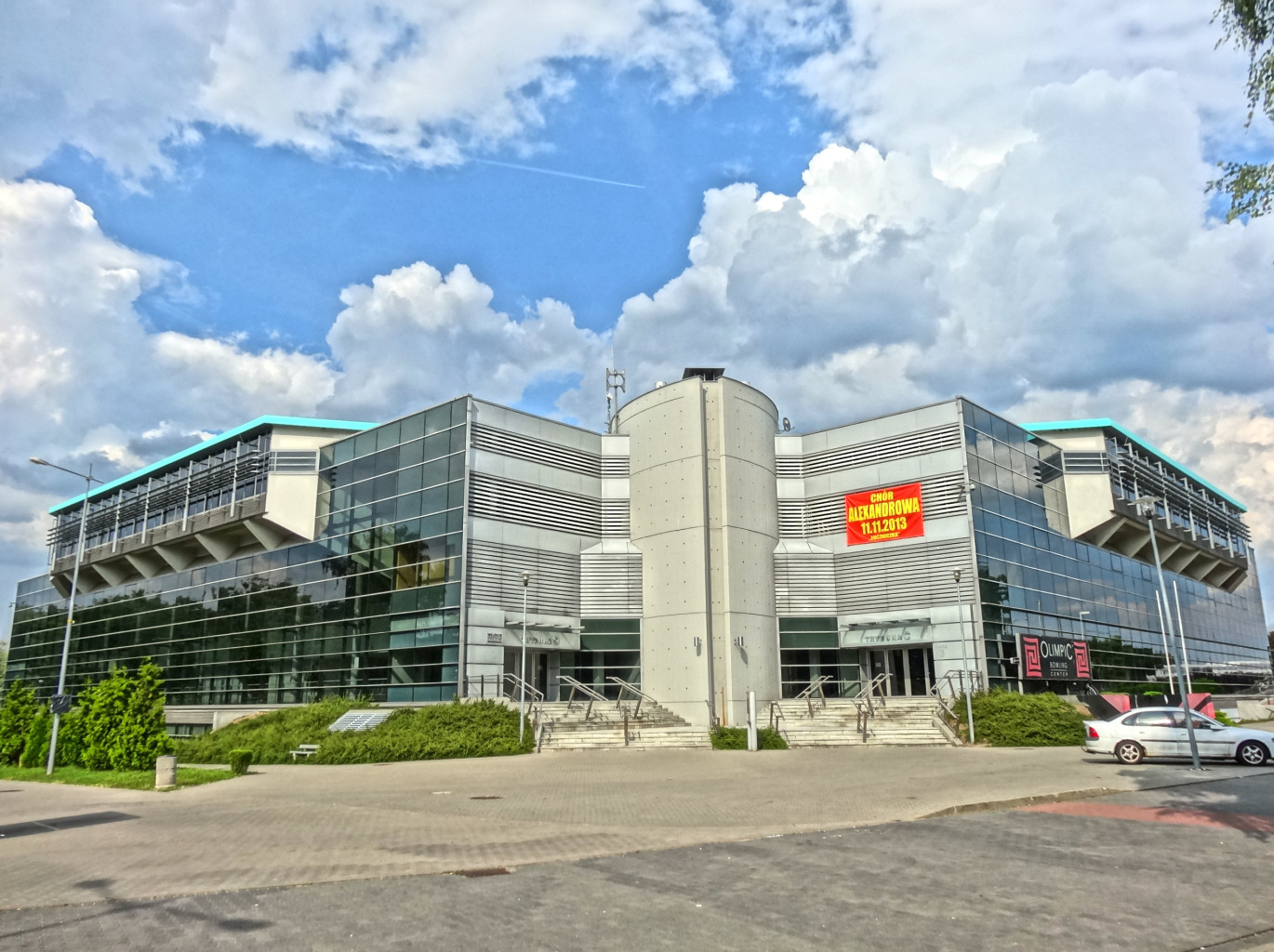
- Interactive map of Hala Sportowo-Widowiskowa Łuczniczka
- Location: ul. Toruńska 59; 85-023 Bydgoszcz
- Coordinates: 53°7′10″N 18°1′32″E
- Owner: Bydgoszcz
- Operator: "Inter-Bud"
- Capacity: 8,764

Construction
- Opened: October 11, 2002
- Architect: Zenon Nowacki

Tenants
- Astoria Bydgoszcz (DBL); Transfer Bydgoszcz (PlusLiga); Artego Bydgoszcz (women's basketball); Pałac Bydgoszcz (women's volleyball)

Immobile Łuczniczka is a sport, show and fair arena in Bydgoszcz, Poland. In sport it is primarily used for volleyball and basketball, and also regularly hosts indoor track-and-field meetings.

The name was given in memory of the city's hallmark, the Archeress statue.

== Events ==
In 2009 Łuczniczka hosted one of two second round stages of the EuroBasket 2009, as well as the preliminary round's Group C of the 2009 Women's European Volleyball Championships. In 2011 (from 18.06.2011 to 26.06.2011) in Bydgoszcz took place Women's European Basketball Championship – the preliminary round's Group A and B.

Since 2003 Łuczniczka also hosted several matches of the FIVB World League (men's volleyball). Recently also the Polish national handball team played its matches in Łuczniczka. The two Bydgoszcz teams competing in the Polish highest volleyball leagues (men's and women's) play its home matches in Łuczniczka.

In February 2010, Łuczniczka hosted the tennis match of the first round of the 2010 Fed Cup World Group II between the national teams of Poland and Belgium.

== Gallery ==
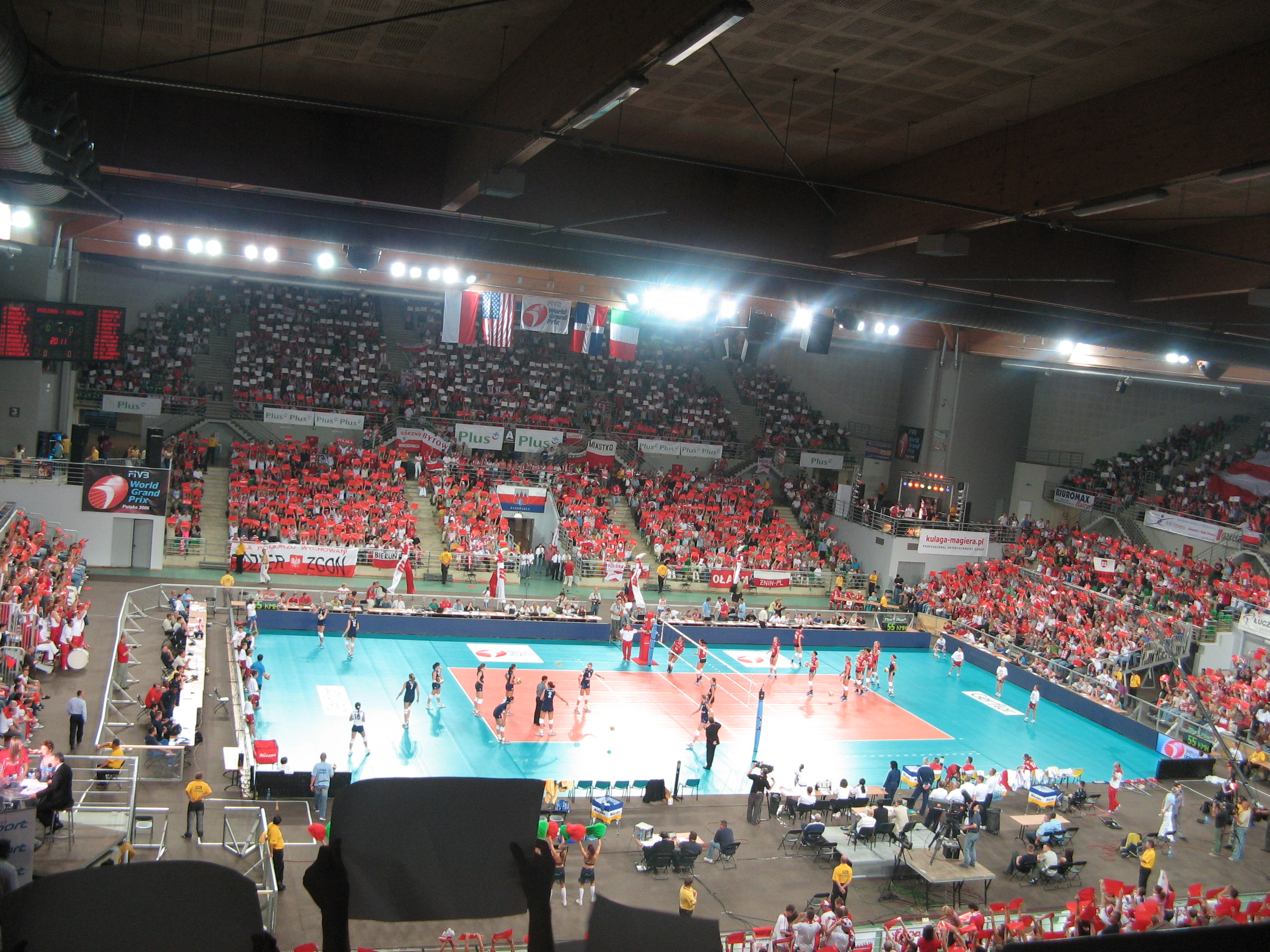
Interior

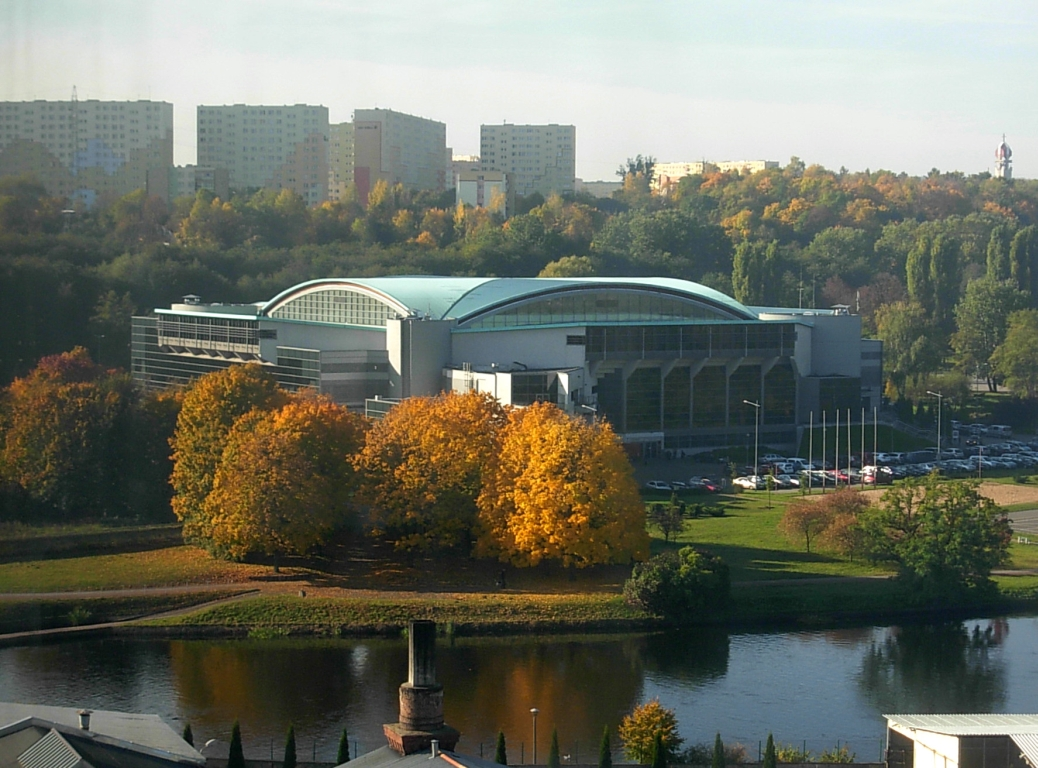
General view

== See also ==
- List of indoor arenas in Poland
- Sport in Poland
