= Eglė Šulčiūtė =

Lithuanian basketball player (born 1985)

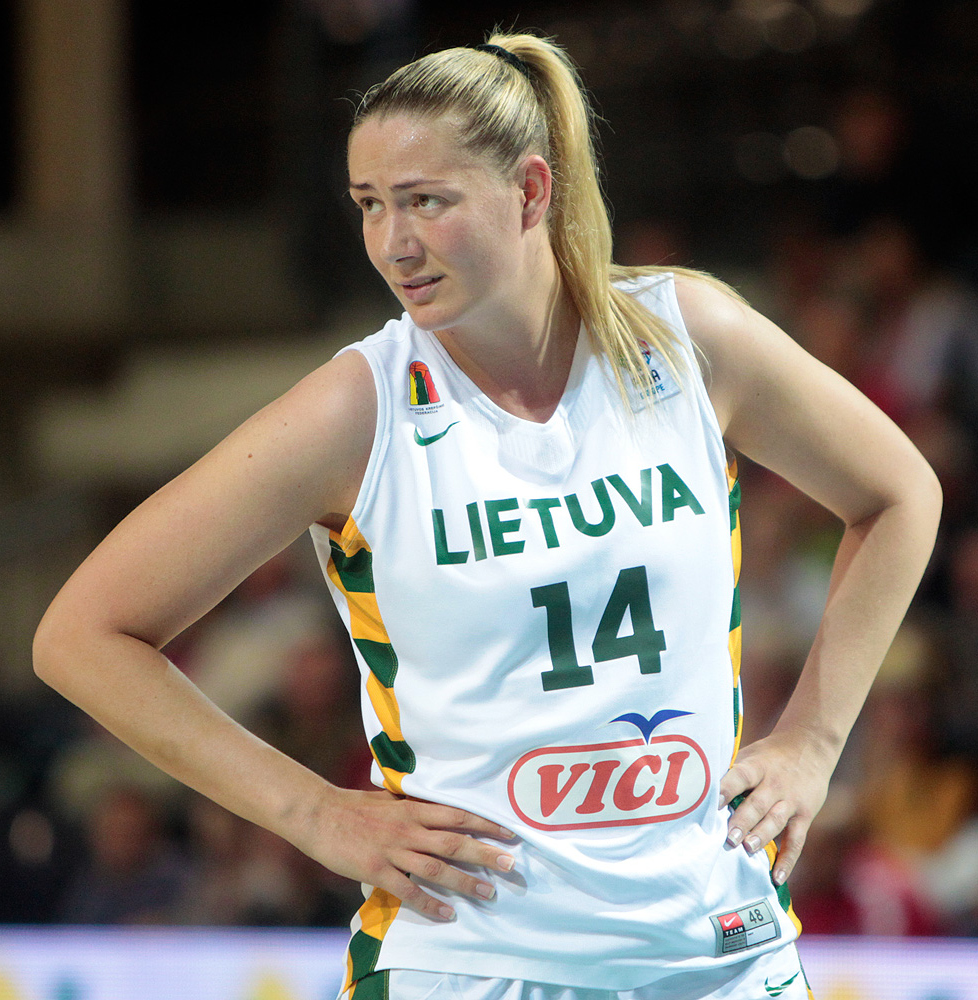

USO Mondeville
- Position: Point guard / shooting guard

Personal information
- Born: August 31, 1985 (age 41) Marijampolė, Lithuanian SSR, Soviet Union
- Listed height: 1.75 m (5 ft 9 in)
- Listed weight: 68 kg (150 lb)

Eglė Šulčiūtė (born August 31, 1985) is a Lithuanian professional basketball player. She plays for USO Mondeville (France) and Lithuania women's national basketball team. She has represented national team in several EuroBasket Women competitions. In 2005, she won in LMKL with Vilniaus Lietuvos telekomas.

== Clubs ==
- 2001-2003: Vilniaus Lintel 118 (LMKL)
- 2003-2004: Alytaus Snaigė (LMKL)
- 2004-2006: Vilniaus Lietuvos telekomas (LMKL)
- 2006-2008: Vilniaus TEO (LMKL)
- 2008-2009: Faenzos Faenza (Italia)
- 2009-2011: Vigo Celta Indepo (Spain)
- 2011-: USO Mondeville (France)
- 2012: Galatasaray Medical Park
