= Émilie Gomis =

French-Senegalese basketball player

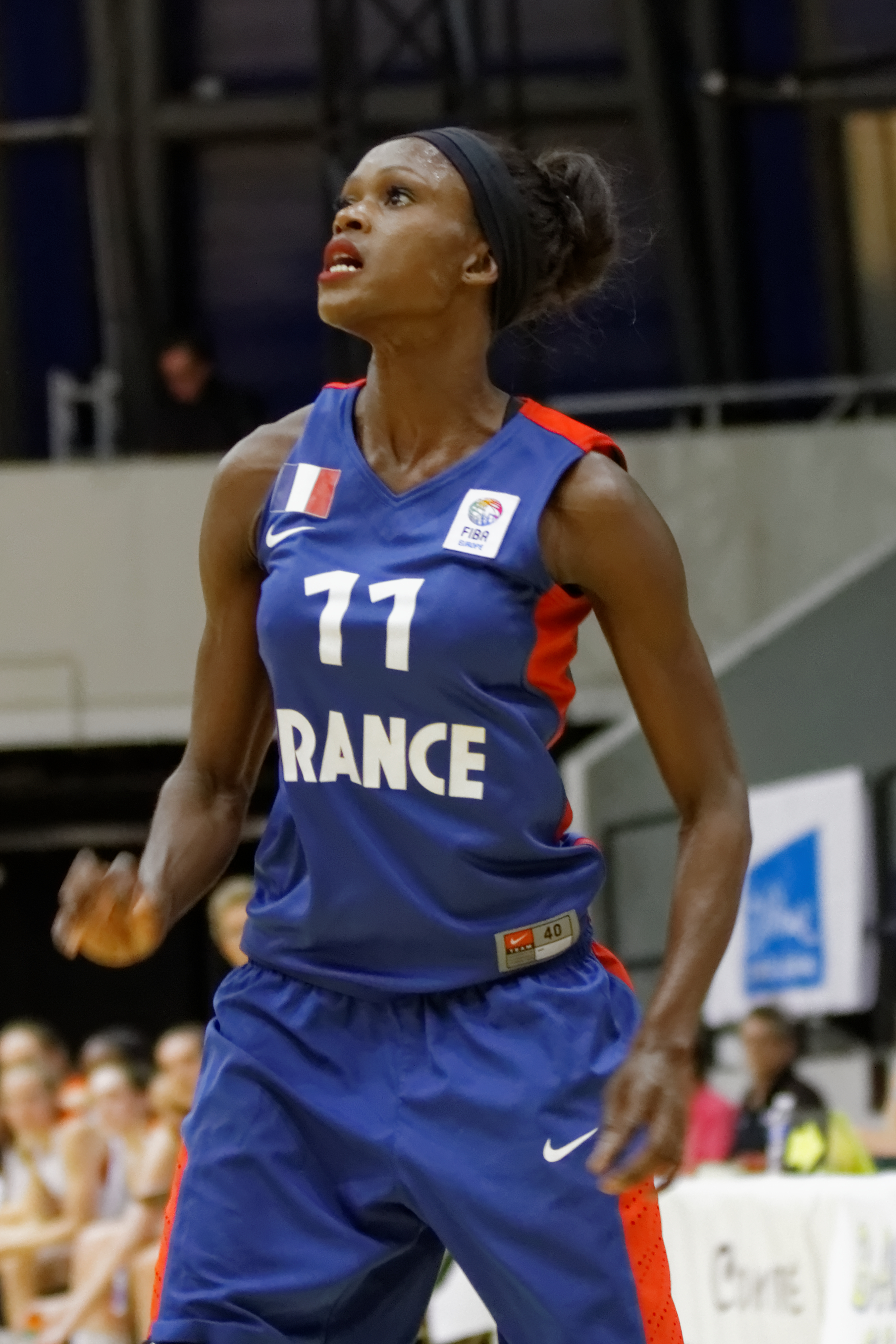

Hainaut Basket
- Position: Guard
- League: LFB

Personal information
- Born: 18 October 1983 (age 43) Senegal
- Listed height: 5 ft 11 in (1.80 m)
- Stats at Basketball Reference

Émilie Gomis (born 18 October 1983) is a French-Senegalese professional basketball player playing point guard position. She played for Fenerbahçe of the TWBL league. She wore the number 4. Competing for France, she won a silver medal at the 2012 Summer Olympics.

In January 2024, Gomis declined an offer to be an ambassador for the Paris 2024 Olympic Games. The organising committee for the games confirmed her refusal in a statement. Gomis published an anti-Israel post on Instagram before announcing the decision.
