= Elliniko-Sourmena B.C. =

Greek basketball club

- Founded: 2012
- History: 1989-2012; Elliniko B.C. 2012 - Present; Elliniko-Sourmena B.C.
- Location: Elliniko, Attica, Greece
- Team colors: Blue and White
| Home | Away |

Elliniko-Sourmena B.C. is a Greek basketball club, based in Elliniko, a suburb in the south of Attica. The club was founded in 2012 after merging the older local basketball clubs, Elliniko B.C. and Sourmena B.C. The colours of the club are the blue and white and the emblem is a torch. The most successful team of the club is the women team which dominated for two seasons (2013–14 and 2014–15) in women's Greek basketball and won two Greek championships and two cups.

== Women's team ==
=== History ===
Elliniko-Sourmena B.C. was founded 2012, after merging of Elliniko B.C. and Sourmena B.C. The former club Elliniko B.C. had promoted in A1 Ethniki in the period 2011-12. The new team replaced Elliniko B.C and played in first division. In period 2012-13 finished in 2nd place, after losing by Panathinaikos in the Championship finals. But the next season reached to top, winning both the championship and the cup. The club repeated the double the next year. But the presence of women team of Elliniko- Sourmena finished in summer of 2015, when the club merged with the Olympiacos women's team and was replaced by Olympiacos in the championship.

=== last seasons ===
| Season | Division | Place | Notes |
|---|---|---|---|
| 2011-12 | A2 Ethniki | 1st | Promoted to A1 (as Elliniko B.C.) |
| 2012-13 | A1 Ethniki | 2nd | |
| 2013-14 | A1 Ethniki | 1st | Winner Greek Cup |
| 2014-15 | A1 Ethniki | 1st | Winner Greek Cup |

=== Notable players ===
- (Greece) Pelagia Papamichail
- (Greece) Anastasia Gkotzi
- (Greece) Evdokia Stamati
- (Greece) Afroditi Kosma
- (United States) Lykendra Johnson
- (Greece) Nena Nikolaidou
- (Greece) Anthi Balta
- (Greece) Maria Roza Boni
- (Greece) Vaso Fouraki
- (Greece) Stella Fouraki
- (Greece) Roula Kalogirou
- (Greece) Aristea Maglara

== Men's team ==
The men's team of Elliniko-Sourmena continues its presence. The club plays in the lower divisions of Greek championship. The season 2014-15, it played in B ESKANA (local division of south Athens).

== Honours ==
Women's Team

- Greek Championships (2): 2014, 2015
- Greek Cups (2): 2014, 2015
