= Katerina Sotiriou =

Greek basketball player

Personal information
- Born: 3 January 1984 (age 42) Athens, Greece
- Listed height: 186 cm (6 ft 1 in)

Career information
- WNBA draft: 2006: undrafted
- Playing career: 1994–present
- Position: Small forward

Career history
- 1994–2001: A.O. Zografou
- 2001–2006: A.S. Akadimia 1975
- 2006–2008: A.K.O. Aris Cholargou
- 2008–2010: Esperides Kallitheas
- 2010–2011: Athinaikos
- 2011–2012: CDB Zaragoza
- 2012–2013: UNB Obenasa Navarra
- 2013–2014: CB Ciudad de Burgos
- 2014–2015: Proteas Voulas
- 2014–2015: Basket Torino
- 2015–2017: PB63 Lady Battipaglia
- 2017–2020: Olympiacos
- 2020–2021: Ceglédi
- 2021–2022: CB Estudiantes
- 2022: CSM Satu Mare
- 2022–2024: Panathinaikos

Aikaterini "Katerina" Sotiriou (Κατερίνα Σωτηρίου, born 3 January 1984) is a Greek professional basketball player who plays for Panathinaikos and Greece women's national basketball team. She has represented national team in several Eurobasket Women and in 2010 FIBA World Championship for Women.

== Club honors ==
=== Panathinaikos ===
- 2× Greek Cup Winner: 2023, 2024
