= 2024–25 Greek Women's Basketball League =

Women's basketball league in Greece

Greek Women's Basketball League
- Season: 2024–25
- Dates: Regular season: 5 October 2024 – 9 March 2025; Play Offs and play outs: 11 March – 13 April 2025
- Teams: 11

Regular season
- Season MVP: (Slovenia) Jessica Shepard
- Relegated: Iraklis SC

Finals
- Champions: Olympiacos SFP (10th title)
- Runners-up: Athinaikos
- Finals MVP: (United States) Rebecca Tobin

Statistical leaders
Points	(Slovenia) Jessica Shepard	26.4
Rebounds	(Slovenia) Jessica Shepard	14.5
Assists	(United States) Kyra Lambert	6.2
Steals	(United States) Quionche Carter	2.6
Blocks	(United States) Elizabeth Dixon	1.6

The 2024–25 Greek Women's Basketball League is the 28th season of the top division women's basketball league in Greece since its establishment in 1997. It starts in October 2024 with the first round of the regular season and ends in May 2025.

Olympiacos SFP are the defending champions.

Olympiacos SFP won their tenth title after beating Athinaikos in the final.

== Format ==
Each team plays each other twice. The top two teams qualify for the semifinals while clubs ranked third to sixth progress to the quarterfinals. The quarterfinals and semifinals are played as a best of three series but the final is played as a best of five series. The teams who placed eighth through eleventh advance to the relegation play offs where one team will be relegated.

== Regular season ==
Pos	Team	Pld	W	L	PF	PA	PD	Pts	Qualification
1	Olympiacos SFP	20	18	2	1657	1249	+408	38	Semifinals
2	Athinaikos	20	16	4	1763	1468	+295	36	Semifinals
3	Panathinaikos AC	20	14	6	1521	1391	+130	34	Quarterfinals
4	Panathlitikos	20	12	8	1486	1467	+19	32	Quarterfinals
5	Proteas Voulas AEO	20	11	9	1334	1368	−34	31	Quarterfinals
6	Amyntas	20	9	11	1417	1529	−112	29 (Note: Amyntas 2–0 PAS Giannina)	Quarterfinals
7	PAS Giannina	20	9	11	1385	1416	−31	29	
8	PAOK	20	7	13	1341	1509	−168	27	Relegation Play Offs
9	Panserraikos	20	6	14	1326	1435	−109	26	Relegation Play Offs
10	Iraklis SC (R)	20	4	16	1274	1528	−254	24 (Note: Iraklis SC 150–149 Esperides Kallitheas)	Relegation Play Offs
11	Esperides Kallitheas	20	4	16	1332	1476	−144	24	Relegation Play Offs

Source: A1 Women's Division
Rules for classification: 1) Points; 2) Points difference; 3) Points scored.
(R) Relegated

=== Play offs ===
Quarterfinals
4	Panathlitikos	57	43	0
5	Proteas Voulas AEO	62	78	2
3	Panathinaikos AC	66	91	75	2
6	Amyntas	67	68	63	1

Semifinals
1	Olympiacos SFP	70	70	2
5	Proteas Voulas AEO	53	57	0
2	Athinaikos	98	78	2
3	Panathinaikos AC	85	69	0

Final
1	Olympiacos SFP	73	75	85	78	3
2	Athinaikos	79	63	62	69	1
Third place
3	Panathinaikos AC	79	87	2
5	Proteas Voulas AEO	70	70	0

Champions of Greece

Olympiacos SFP
Tenth title

== Play outs ==
The loser of the play out final gets relegated.

Semifinals	Final
8	PAOK	48	69	75	2
11	Esperides Kallitheas	78	64	65	1
11	Esperides Kallitheas	49	57	60	68	3
10	Iraklis SC	47	59	40	58	1
9	Panserraikos	73	69	2
10	Iraklis SC	68	65	0
