= Evdokia Stamati =

Greek basketball player

Evina Stamati
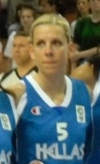

No. 5 – Athinaikos
- Position: Shooting guard
- League: A1

Personal information
- Born: 2 August 1984 (age 42) Athens, Greece
- Listed height: 5 ft 10 in (1.78 m)
- Listed weight: 185 lb (84 kg)

Career information
- WNBA draft: 2006: undrafted
- Playing career: 2001–present

Career history
- 2001–2003: Atromitos E.S. Iraklis Piraeus
- 2003–2009: Panathinaikos
- 2009–2010: ICIM Arad
- 2010–2012: F.E.A. N. Filadelfeia–N. Chalkidona
- 2012–2015: Elliniko-Sourmena
- 2015–2023: Olympiakos
- 2023–2024: Proteas Voulas
- 2024–present: Athinaikos

Evdokia "Evina" Stamati (Εβίνα Σταμάτη, born 2 August 1984) is a Greek professional basketball player who plays for Athinaikos and Greece women's national basketball team. She was part of the Greek national team in Eurobasket 2017.
