= Iouliti Lymoura =

Greek basketball player

Lolita Lymoura
Personal information
- Born: 10 March 1985 (age 41) Piraeus, Athens, Greece
- Listed height: 5 ft 11 in (1.80 m)
- Listed weight: 165 lb (75 kg)

Career information
- WNBA draft: 2007: undrafted
- Playing career: 1997–2022
- Position: Point guard

Career history
- 2000–2007: Esperides Kallitheas
- 2007–2008: Virtus Viterbo
- 2008–2009: ASDG Comense 1872
- 2009–2013: Athinaikos
- 2013–2015: Proteas Voulas
- 2015–2016: Panathinaikos
- 2016–2020: PAOK
- 2020–2022: Panathinaikos

Iouliti "Lolita" Lymoura (Greek: Ιουλίτη «Λολίτα» Λύμουρα, born 10 March 1985) is a retired Greek basketball player who last played for Panathinaikos. She was a valuable member of the senior women's Greek national team Greek national team from 2002 to 2018.
