= Olga Chatzinikolaou =

Greek basketball player

Personal information
- Born: July 4, 1981 (age 45) Athens, Greece
- Listed height: 5 ft 11 in (1.80 m)

Career information
- Playing career: 1997–2022
- Position: Guard

Career history
- 1997–2001: Ilioupoli
- 2001–2005: Asteras Exarchion
- 2005–2009: Esperides Kallitheas
- 2009–2012: Athinaikos
- 2012–2015: Caja Rural
- 2015–2018: Olympiacos
- 2020–2022: Panathinaikos

Olga Chartzinikolaou (born in Athens on 4 July 1981) is a retired Greek basketball 1.81 m. wing, who last played for Panathinaikos in the Greek Championship. She is a member of the Greek national team.

== Career ==
- 1997–2001 (Greece) Ilioupoli
- 2001–2005 (Greece) Asteras Exarchion
- 2005–2009 (Greece) Esperides Kallitheas
- 2009–2012 (Greece) Athinaikos
- 2012–2015 (Spain) Caja Rural
- 2015–2018 (Greece) Olympiacos
- 2021–2022 (Greece) Panathinaikos
