= Eleni Kapogianni =

Greek basketball coach

Panathinaikos
- Position: Head coach

Personal information
- Born: 24 August 1969 (age 57) Greece

Career history

Coaching
- 2007–2008: Panathinaikos (assistant)
- 2013–2015: Elliniko-Sourmena
- 2015–2017: Olympiacos
- 2018–2019: Homenetmen Antelias
- 2019–present: Panathinaikos
- 2023–present: Iran

Eleni Kapogianni (Greek: Ελένη Καπογιάννη; born 24 August 1969, in Greece) is a professional Greek basketball coach of Panathinaikos women's team.

Under Kapogianni's guidance, Olympiacos won the Greek League and the Greek Cup undefeated in both the 2015–16 and the 2016–17 seasons.
