= Mirna Mazić =

Croatian basketball player

Olympiacos
- Position: Power forward
- League: Greek Women's Basketball League; EuroCup Women

Personal information
- Born: 24 December 1985 (age 40) Zagreb, SFR Yugoslavia
- Listed height: 1.88 m (6 ft 2 in)
- Listed weight: 61 kg (134 lb)

Career information
- WNBA draft: 2007: undrafted

Career history
- 2003–2006: Richmond Spiders
- 2006: Umana Reyer Venezia
- 2006–2009: Medveščak
- 2009–2010: Esperides Kallitheas
- 2010–2011: Energa Toruń
- 2011: Panionios
- 2011–2013: Novi Zagreb
- 2010–2011: Gospić
- 2011–2013: Novi Zagreb
- 2013: Tarbes
- 2014: Kayseri Kaski Spor
- 2014: Gernika Bizkaia
- 2014–2017: Kayseri Kaski Spor
- 2017–2019: Olympiacos
Medals
Women's basketball
Representing Croatia
Mediterranean Games
| Silver medal – second place | 2005 Almería | Team |
| Bronze medal – third place | 2009 Pescara | Team |

Mirna Mazić (born 24 December 1985 in Zagreb, SFR Yugoslavia) is a Croatian female basketball player, currently playing for Olympiacos. At the 2012 Summer Olympics, she competed for the Croatia women's national basketball team in the women's event. She is 6 feet 2 inches (1.88 m) tall.
