= Eleanna Christinaki =

Greek-Cypriot basketball player

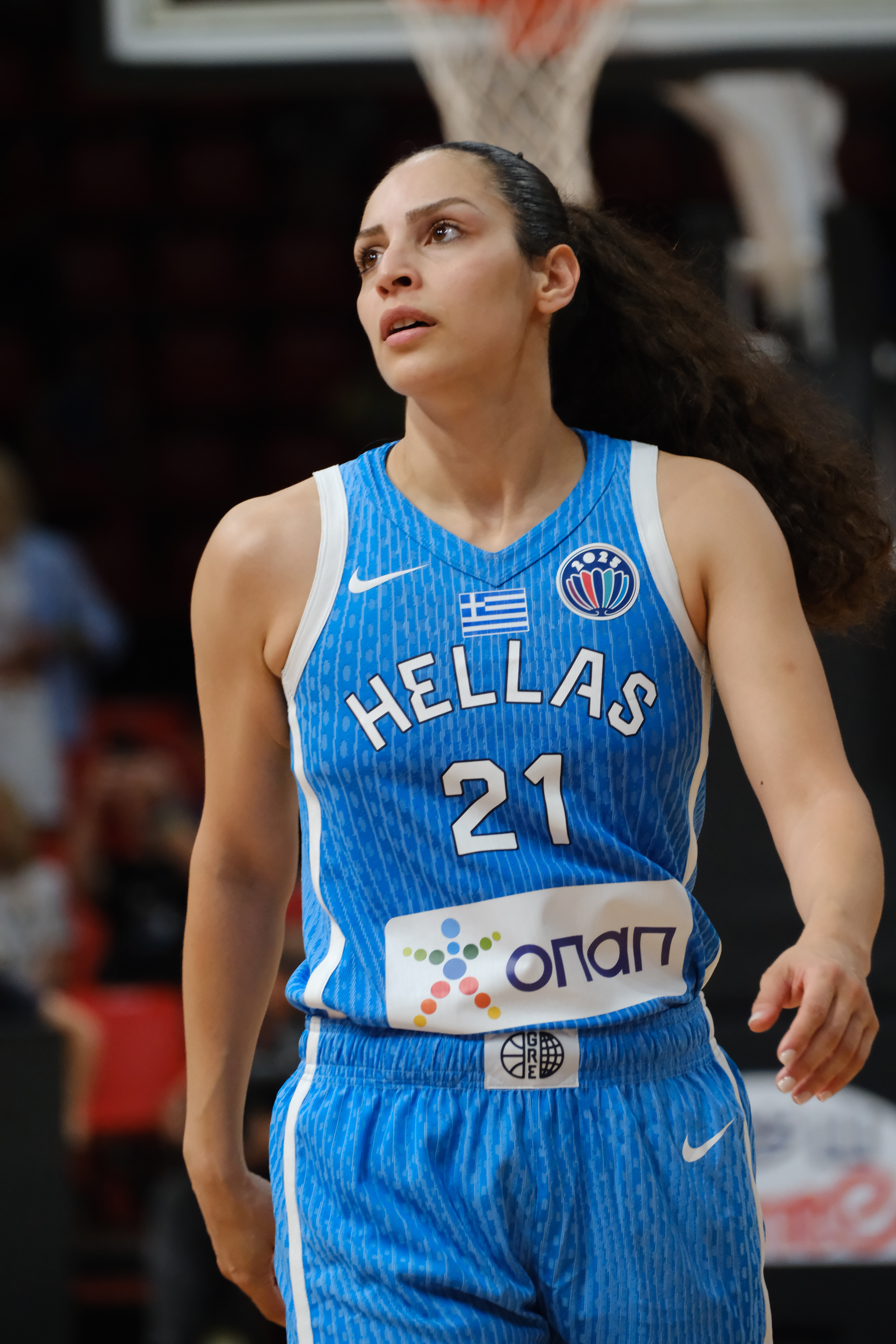
- Christinaki in June 2025

No. 21 – Olympiacos
- Position: Small forward
- League: Greek League

Personal information
- Born: 16 December 1996 (age 29) Paralimni, Cyprus
- Listed height: 6 ft 0 in (1.83 m)
- Listed weight: 162 lb (73 kg)

Career information
- College: Florida (2015–2017); Maryland (2017–2018)
- Playing career: 2011–present

Career history
- 2011–2014: Panathinaikos
- 2014–2015: Athinaikos
- 2018–2019: Gernika- Eurocup
- 2019: BC Castors Braine
- 2020: Nadezhda Orenburg
- 2020–2021: Al-Qazeres
- 2021–2022: Araski
- 2022: Schio
- 2022: Valencia
- 2023: Panathinaikos
- 2023–present: Olympiacos

Career highlights
- SEC All-Freshman Team (2016)

Eleanna Christinaki (Greek: Ελεάννα Χριστινάκη; born 16 December 1996) is a Greek Cypriot professional basketball player. She was selected for the Greece women's national basketball team at the age of 17 and has since acquired 78 caps for her country. She is the second-youngest player in history to be selected for the team. Additionally, she has captained the U-20 national team.

At club level, Christinaki plays for Olympiacos. In the 2023–2024 season, she was named the MVP of the regular season of the Greek Basketball League. She has played for four Euroleague teams. She is known for her versatility, rebounding, and passing skills. She is averaging 15.2 points, 7 rebounds, and several assists per game in the EuroCup and national team qualification windows for 2025 Eurobasket.

== College career ==
In 2015, Christinaki began her college career with the Florida Gators women's basketball team. During her first season, she averaged 10.4 points per game across 31 games. She scored in double figures 17 times and recorded two double-doubles. She was named to the SEC All-Freshman Team and the preseason First Team All-SEC.

In her sophomore season, Christinaki played nine games for the Gators, averaging 17.6 points per game. In December 2016, she announced her decision to leave the Gators.

In January 2017, Christinaki announced she would be joining the Maryland Terrapins women's basketball team, which was ranked third in the nation at the time.

In her lone season with the Maryland Terrapins, Christinaki averaged 11.8 points and 4.6 rebounds in 22 games. In her debut game, she scored 32 points off the bench in a 113–49 victory over Coppin State, setting a record for the most points scored by a Maryland player in a debut game. She also scored 26 points in a 99–69 victory over conference rival Ohio State.

On 23 June 2018, Christinaki announced she would forgo her senior season to play professionally, as she was constantly balancing her commitments with the Greek national team.

== Club career ==
Christinaki moved to Panathinaikos in 2011. She stayed with the team for three years and won the Greek Women's Basketball League during the 2012–13 season. She was invited to join the senior Greek national team at the age of 17, making her the second-youngest player ever to be selected for the team. In 2013, 2014, and 2015, she received the award for the best young player in Greece and was named one of the top five valuable young players in Greece three times.

During the 2014–15 season, Christinaki played with Athinaikos, a team that had won the EuroCup. She won the Belgian Cup and Championship with Castor Braine in 2019. She also won the Italian Supercup with Famila Schio in 2022. While playing with Athinaikos women's basketball, she was named MVP of the Greek Basketball Championship for junior women. In her career with Athinaikos, she averaged 15 points and 5 rebounds per game.

On 1 November, she signed with Gernika KESB.

On 2 January 2023 she returned to Panathinaikos.

== National team career ==
Christinaki is a member of Greece women's national basketball team, and she played at EuroBasket Women 2015, EuroBasket Women 2017 and World Cup 2018. She won 4th place with the Greek team, EuroBasket Women 2017. She won 9th place with the Greek team at the World Championship games in Tenerife. Christinaki played 2015 FIBA Europe UNder-20 DiVision B and she was in the best five valuable players of the tournament averaging 19.7 points per game. Christinaki also played at 2016 FIBA Europe Under-20 Championship for Women averaging 15.8 points per game, with the Greek basketball team. She also has caps with the Cyprus U16 basketball team, from 2010 to 2011.

She represented Greek senior national team 67 times in the past 11 years. She is currently averaging 16 points per game and 7 rebounds in the 2023 qualifications games for Eurobasket 2025. In 2018, she took part at the 2018 FIBA Women's Basketball World Cup with the Greek national team, they finished 9th in the world.

== College statistics ==
Legend
GP	Games played	GS	Games started	MPG	Minutes per game
FG%	Field goal percentage	3P%	3-point field goal percentage	FT%	Free throw percentage
RPG	Rebounds per game	APG	Assists per game	SPG	Steals per game
BPG	Blocks per game	PPG	Points per game	**Bold**	Career high

Year	Team	GP	Points	FG%	3P%	FT%	RPG	APG	SPG	BPG	PPG
2015-16	Florida	**31**	**323**	42.9%	30.0%	70.8%	3.2	**3.4**	**1.3**	**0.1**	10.4
2016-17	Florida	9	158	**44.2%**	28.6%	**77.4%**	**4.7**	3.0	0.8	-	**17.6**
2017-18	Maryland	22	260	36.6%	**32.3%**	73.9%	4.6	1.5	0.8	-	11.8
Career		62	741	40.7%	30.8%	72.9%	3.9	2.7	1.1	0.1	12.0
