= Angeliki Nikolopoulou =

Greek basketball player

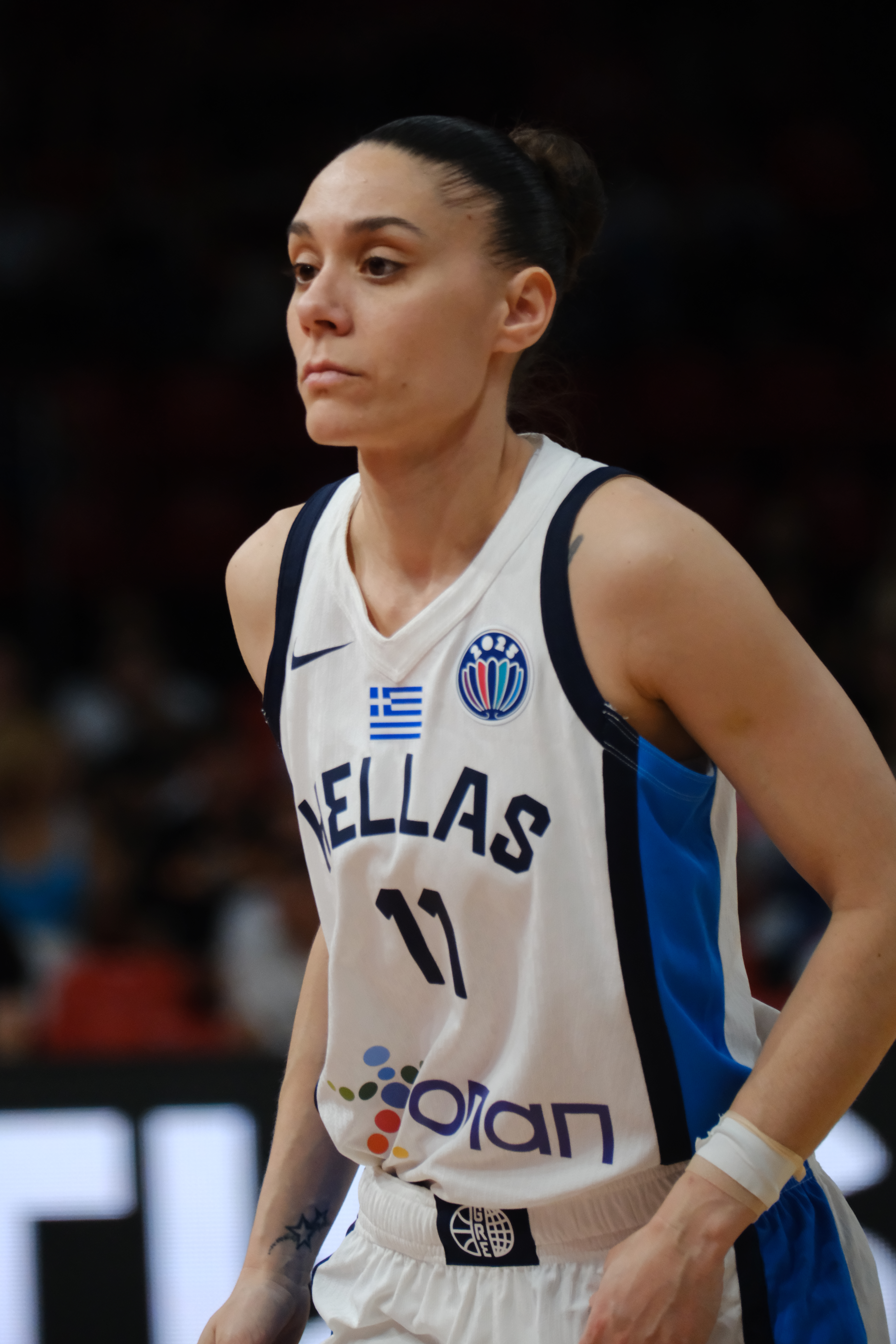

Personal information
- Born: 2 May 1991 (age 35) Athens, Greece
- Listed height: 5 ft 9 in (1.75 m)
- Listed weight: 154 lb (70 kg)
- Position: Point guard
- Number: 11

Career history
- 2008–2009: AE Pagrati
- 2010–2012: AEO Proteas Voulas
- 2012–2013: AS KOON Ippokratis
- 2013–2017: AEO Proteas Voulas
- 2017–2026: Olympiakos Piraeus

Career highlights
- 7× Greek A1 champion (2018–2020,2022-2025); 4× Greek Cup (2018, 2019,2022,2025)

Angeliki Nikolopoulou (Αγγελική Νικολοπούλου, born 2 May 1991) is a Greek professional basketball player who last played for Olympiacos and Greece women's national basketball team. She is part of the Greek national team in Eurobasket 2017.
