= Mariella Fasoula =

Greek basketball player

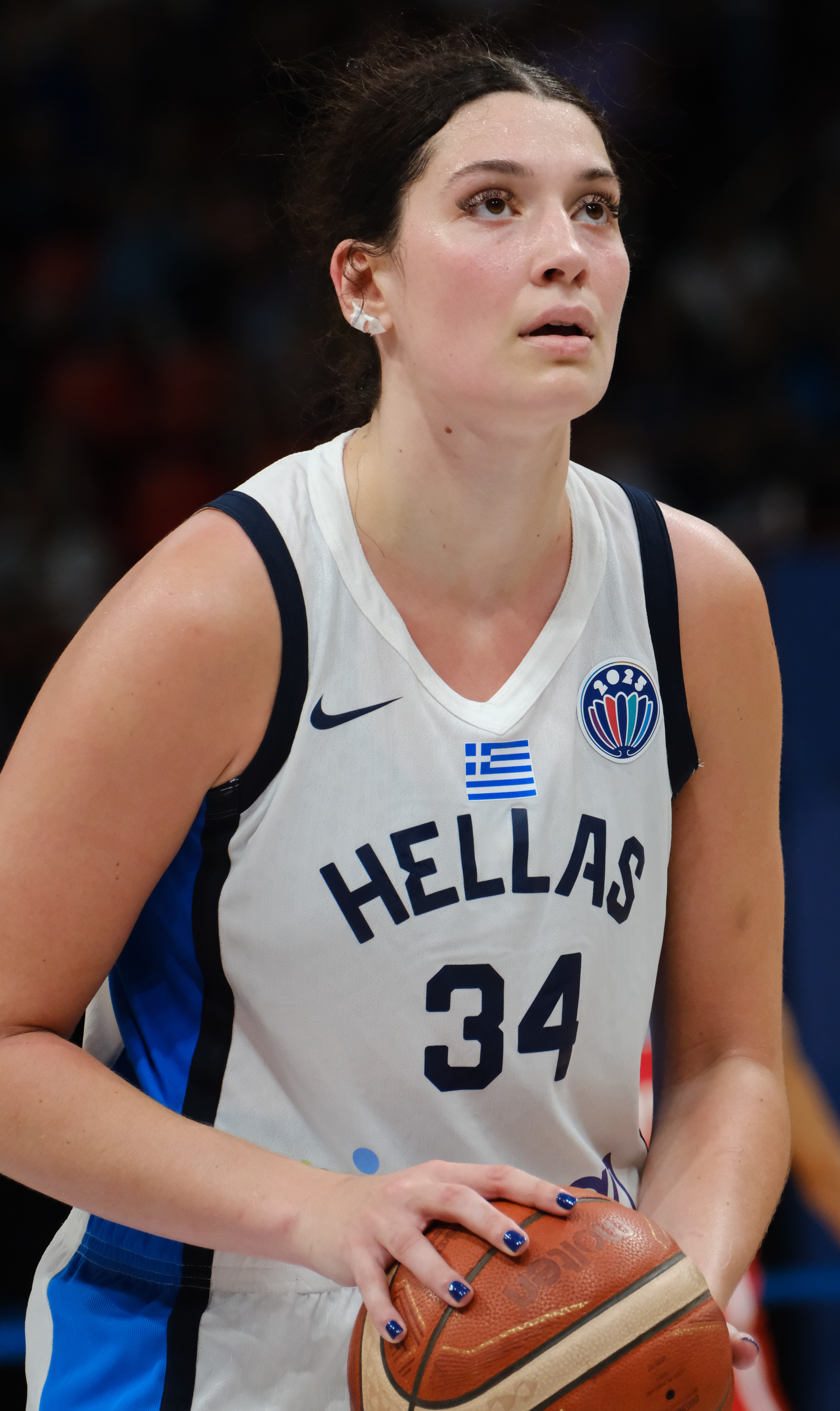

No. 34 – Athinaikos
- Position: Center
- League: Greek Basketball League; EuroLeague Women

Personal information
- Born: 2 September 1997 (age 29) Marousi, Greece
- Listed height: 6 ft 4 in (1.93 m)
- Listed weight: 209 lb (95 kg)

Career information
- High school: Lausanne Collegiate School (Memphis, Tennessee); American Community School (Athens, Greece)
- College: Boston College (2015–2017); Vanderbilt (2018–2020)
- WNBA draft: 2020: undrafted

Career history
- 2013–2015: Proteas Voulas
- 2020–2021: Al-Qázeres
- 2021: Clarinos Tenerife
- 2021–2025: CB Avenida
- 2025–2026: Beşiktaş
- 2026: Toronto Tempo
- 2026–present: Athinaikos
- Stats at WNBA.com
- Stats at Basketball Reference

Mariella Fasoula (born 2 September 1997) is a Greek basketball player for Athinaikos of the Greek Basketball League. She previously played for the Toronto Tempo of the Women's National Basketball Association (WNBA). She is also a member of the Greek national team.

== Career ==
She participated at the EuroBasket Women 2017 and 2023.

=== WNBA ===
On April 12, 2026, she signed a training camp contract with the Golden State Valkyries of the Women's National Basketball Association (NBA). On May 2, Fasoula was waived by the Golden State Valkyries. On May 5, 2026, she signed a developmental contract with the Toronto Tempo.

On May 23, 2026, Fasoula was released by the Tempo.

== Personal life ==
Her father is the former basketball player Panagiotis Fasoulas.
