= Ivana Raca =

Serbian basketball player

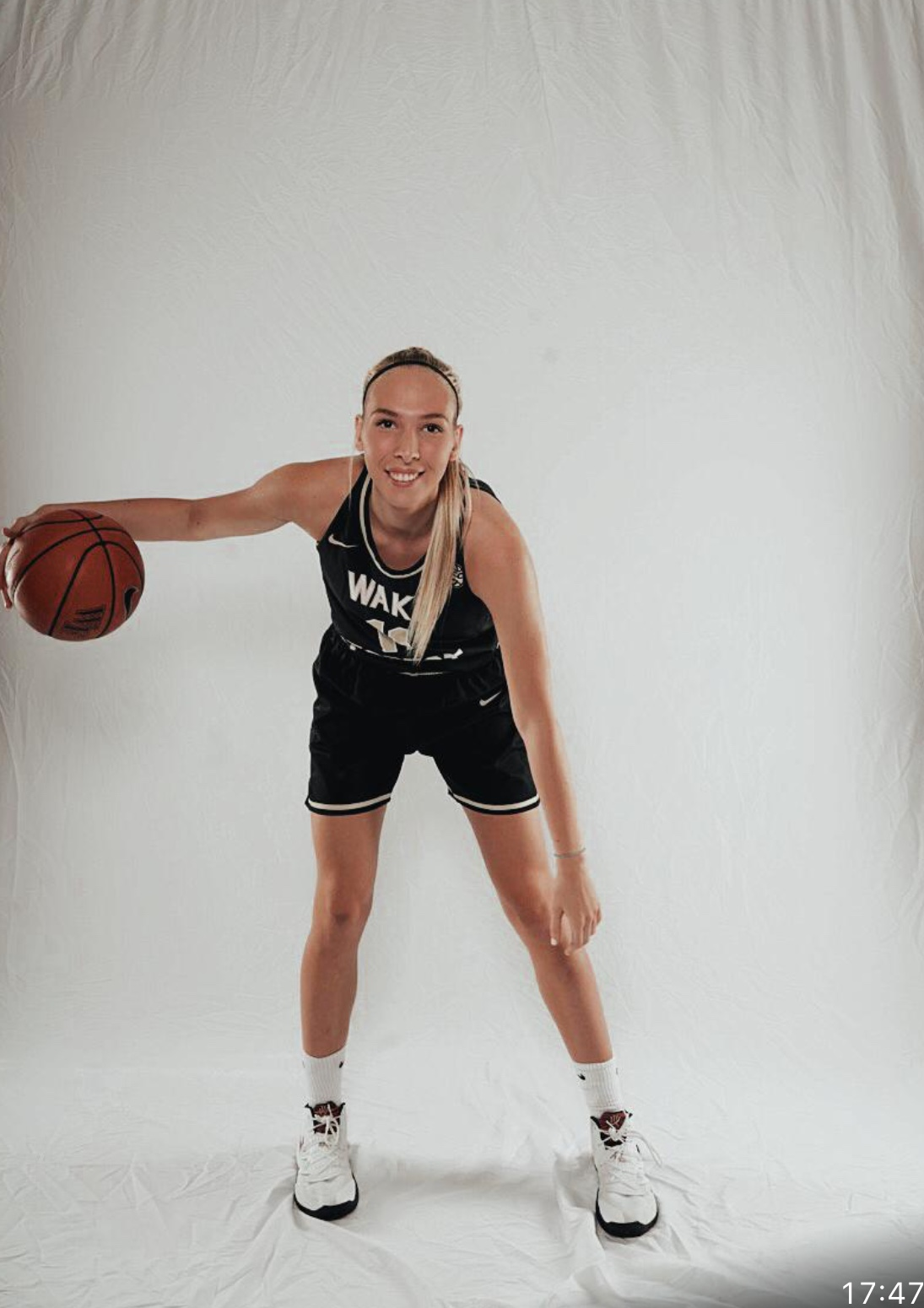

No. 1 – Athinaikos
- Position: Power forward
- League: A1

Personal information
- Born: September 10, 1999 (age 27) Larnaca, Cyprus
- Listed height: 6 ft 2 in (1.88 m)

Career information
- High school: 1st Lyceum of Voula (Athens, Greece)
- College: Wake Forest (2017–2021)
- WNBA draft: 2021: 3rd round, 28th overall pick
- Drafted by: Los Angeles Sparks

Career history
- 2015–2017: Proteas Voulas
- 2021–2022: Geas Basket
- 2022–2023: Fenerbahçe
- 2023–2024: Dinamo Sassari
- 2024–2025: Olympiacos
- 2025–present: Athinaikos

Career highlights
- First-team All-ACC (2021); Euroleague (2023); Greek premiere league (2025,2026); Greek cup (2025,2026); Turkish league champion
- Stats at Basketball Reference
Medals
Women's basketball
Representing Serbia
U18 European Championship
Silver medal – second place	2017 Hungary	Team competition

Ivana Raca (born September 10, 1999) is a Serbian professional basketball player who currently plays for Athinaikos of the A1 in Greece and the Serbia Women's National Basketball Team. Standing at 1.88 meters (6 ft 2 in), she primarily plays in the power forward position. Raca earned a degree in psychology from Wake Forest University, where she competed in collegiate basketball from 2017 to 2021. She was selected as the 28th overall pick by the Los Angeles Sparks in the 2021 WNBA Draft.

In 2018, Raca competed in the FIBA U20 Women's European Championship in Sopron, Hungary, where she was named to the tournament's All-Star Five. She also received audience recognition as the tournament’s Most Valuable Player. Earlier in her youth international career, she contributed to Serbia’s junior national teams, earning silver medals in the U18 and U20 European Championships.

Raca began playing basketball at a young age, influenced by her father Dragan Raca, a basketball coach and former professional player. She trained in youth systems in both Cyprus and Greece before moving to the United States for her college education.

During her time at Wake Forest, Raca became the 28th player in program history to surpass 1,000 career points. She concluded her college career ranked ninth all-time in scoring with 1,469 points and tenth in total rebounds with 705.

== College ==
Raca joined Wake Forest University in 2017.

=== Wake Forest statistics ===
Legend
GP	Games played	GS	Games started	MPG	Minutes per game
FG%	Field goal percentage	3P%	3-point field goal percentage	FT%	Free throw percentage
RPG	Rebounds per game	APG	Assists per game	SPG	Steals per game
BPG	Blocks per game	PPG	Points per game	**Bold**	Career high

Year	Team	GP	Points	FG%	3P%	FT%	RPG	APG	SPG	BPG	PPG
2017-18	Wake Forest	31	143	**43.0%**	**32.6%**	72.0%	2.6	1.0	0.5	0.3	4.6
2018-19	Wake Forest	30	373	37.6%	27.6%	77.9%	6.4	**1.9**	**1.2**	0.5	12.4
2019-20	Wake Forest	**32**	**547**	40.3%	31.3%	74.5%	6.8	1.7	1.1	0.4	**17.1**
2020-21	Wake Forest	25	417	41.6%	28.4%	**80.0%**	**9.0**	1.7	1.0	**0.7**	16.7
Career		118	1,480	40.2%	30.4%	79.3%	6.1	1.6	0.9	0.5	12.5

== Career ==
Born in Cyprus, Ivana started playing basketball in 2009 at the AEL club from Limassol (junior team). From 2010 to 2012, she played in the following clubs: AEL from Limassol (junior team) and Proteas da Noi AEL Limassol. As a very young woman, she played for the younger basketball team of Cyprus. She continued her playing career in the junior team of PAOK from Thessaloniki, where she played from 2012 to 2015. As a member of PAOK's junior team and senior team, she played two seasons from 2013 to 2015. She played for the team Proteas Voulas from 2015 to 2017. In the jersey of this team, she achieved incredible success in the quadruple-double - 22 points, 21 rebounds, 11 assists and 10 stolen balls, and brought the cup to her team in the ESKANA (South East Attica Association) CUP for Junior Women's. In Greece, she won all the national championships in the junior category. Twice she was in the Top - 5. Twice she participated in the school world championships in Limoges, France (2015) and Porec, Croatia (2017) as the team captain, where she won a silver medal and was in the top five of the championship. Since 2017, he has been playing for the Wake Forrest University basketball team at the University of North Carolina, USA. In 2017, she played in the jersey of the Serbian junior national team at the European Under-18 Basketball Championship (2017 FIBA U18 Women's European Championship - Division A). The following 2018, she won a silver medal (2018 FIBA U20 Women's European Championship) with the junior national team of Serbia (under 20) in Sopron, Hungary. Ivana plays for the senior national team of Serbia. Raca was drafted by the Los Angeles Sparks in the third round of the 2021 WNBA draft. In June 2021 Raca signed to Italian Geas Basket.

== Serbian representation ==
She played for all the younger selections of the Serbian national team, and is currently in the senior team of the national team. With the national team under 18, she won a silver medal at the 2017 World Championships in Sopron, Hungary. (2017 FIBA U18 Women's European Championship - Division A). At the European Championship in Sopron for players under 20 with the national team of Serbia (2018 FIBA U20 Women's European Championship), they won the silver medal again, in 2018. Ivana hit one of the most important shots, perhaps the key one in winning a medal - a three-pointer in the overtime match against the Italian national team. In the game against Slovakia, in the eighth finals, she scored 36 points, four threes, no misses, had ten rebounds - index 43. At the championship she was named a member of the ideal five (All-Star Five), and by the audience was chosen as the best player (MVP) of the European Championship.

== Achievements ==
Cyprus Cadet Championship (2009, 2010 and 2012).

Best Young Player of the Cyprus League (2012).

Played for the Cypriot national team (U16).

She won the Cyprus School Championship (2012 and 2013).

He won the Greek Junior Championship with the team (2013, 2015, 2016 and 2017).

She won the Greek School Championship (2013, 2014, 2015, 2016 and 2017).

Played in the Greek U15 national team (U15) (2013).

With the national team of Greece - under 15 won the tournament in Kavala (2013).

With the national team of Greece - under 15 he won the tournament in Athens (2014 and 2015) where he was the top scorer of the tournament.

Named the best player (MVP) under 15 in the tournament (New Year Kapagerovf) (2014).

Named the top scorer under 15 in the tournament (New Year Kapagerovf) (2014).

They won a gold medal at the World School Basketball Championship. (2015)

She twice participated in the school world championships in Limoges, France (2015) and Poreč, Croatia (2017) as the team captain, where she won a silver medal and was in the top five of the championship.

Named the best young player in Greece (2016).

In the junior championship of Greece, she won a gold medal - the best scorer of the championship (2017). [5]

Selected as the best player (All-Bosmans Team) (2017) A1 - senior team. [6]

With the national team under 18, she won a silver medal at the 2017 World Championships in Shapron, Hungary. (2017 FIBA U18 European Women's Championship - Division A). [7]

She won a silver medal in 2018 at the European Championship in Sopron for players under 20 with the Serbian national team (2018 FIBA U20 Women's European Championship). [8] [8]

At the European Championships, she was named a member of the All-Star Five (2018). [9]

He was chosen by the audience as the best player (MVP) of the European Championship (2018).

She scored 1,000 points in her career and thus became the 28th player in the history of the Wake Forist club. [10]

ALL-ACC top 3, average number of points 17.2 per game, 11 games with over 20 points - Top 3, total 193 points for two points - Top 2. [11] [12]

The best result in the last 20 years at the ALL-ACC tournament, 27 points and 13 rebounds. ALL-ACC First Team Tournament, top scorer tournament with an average of 20.33 points per game. [13]

Best ACC Conference Team (2020–2021)

Best ACC Conference Conference Team (2020)

Best (Best Little Striker in the USA) Basketball Hall of Fame FINALIST Miller's Award

ALL - ACC academic team

She was among the four best players in history with performance: double-double, number of points and rebounds

NCAA (International Player of the Year Finalist) Finalist

Named the best Wake Forista sport in all sports (2021)

VNBA - Draft as 28 pick from Los Angeles Sparks (2021)

ACC - averaged 17 points and 9 rebounds per game in 2021 (top scorer and jumper)

Fenerbahce - Turkish Super League winner (2022/23)

Fenerbahce - EuroLeague Women winner (2022/23)

Career highlights:

Euroleague (2023)

Greek premiere league (2025,2026)

Greek cup (2025,2026)

Turkish league champion

== Family ==
Ivana comes from a basketball family. Her father Dragan Raca is a former Serbian basketball player and a famous basketball coach who built his career in Cyprus, Greece and China. He was the selector of the basketball national teams of Lebanon, Cyprus and North Macedonia. He achieves notable coaching achievements today in China, where he has been engaged since 2010. Today, he heads the Beikong Fly Dragons basketball club, a member of the Chinese CBA League, as a coach, head coach and general supervisor. For his long-term work in the field of basketball, he was promoted to Honorary Doctor of Science "Alpha BC University".

Branka Raca's mother is a former basketball player and coach who built her career in Serbia and Cyprus. She was her first coach. Ivana's sister, Tijana Raca (October 28, 1997), is also a well-known basketball player and member of the Cyprus national team who played for the Wyoming University team.

== See also ==
- List of Serbian WNBA players
