= Panathinaikos women's basketball =

Panathinaikos
- Nickname: Trifýlli (The Shamrock); Prássines (The Greens); PAO
- Leagues: Greek League; EuroCup
- Founded: 1919; 107 years ago
- Arena: Pavlos and Thanasis Giannakopoulos Indoor Hall; Cholargos Indoor Hall
- Capacity: 1,500; 1,240
- Location: Athens, Greece
- Team colors: Green, White
- Main sponsor: OPAP
- President: Dimitris Vranopoulos
- Team manager: Iouliti Lymoura
- Head coach: Selen Erdem
- Championships: 5 Greek Championships; 3 Greek Cups; 1 Greek A2 Championship
- Website: pao1908.com
Home	Away

Panathinaikos AC Women's Basketball is the women's basketball department of the major Greek multi-sport club Panathinaikos A.O. The club is based in Athens, Greece. The department was founded in 1937 creating the first and oldest women's basketball team in the country. Pavlos and Thanasis Giannakopoulos Indoor Hall is the home arena of the team.

They have won the Greek Championship five times (1997–98, 1999–00, 2004–05, 2012–13, 2020–21) and the Greek Cup three times (1999–00, 2022–23, 2023–24).

== History ==
The Panathinaikos women's basketball team was the first to be founded in Greece, in 1937, and undoubtedly represents yet another pioneering achievement of the “Shamrock” club.

The “Greens” began to make their presence felt in the early 1950s, notably winning the Athens Championship in 1950, while a few years later, in 1954, they claimed the Easter Cup. A little earlier, in 1948, Panathinaikos’ second team had won the Mantellos Cup.

Up until around 1967, the core of the team often consisted of athletes who were members of families of the club's athletes or officials, and they had been training at the indoor court on Leoforos Avenue since around 1960.

Since 1983, the team has competed in the top division championships, though it was relegated in the 2017–18 season, when it was forced to play with youth players.

In the meantime, the “Fighting Souls” celebrated four Greek Championships and one Greek Cup.

The team's most outstanding season is considered to be 1999–2000, when it won both the championship and the cup under the administration of Thodoris Aloupis.

The team's coach was Yasemi Samantoura, while the roster included Robinson, Van Gorp, Kalentzou, Nikolaidou, Papadimou, Papamichail, Trialoni, Liakou, Koumioti, and Rogiti.

== Roster ==
Note: Flags indicate national team eligibility at FIBA-sanctioned events. Players may hold other non-FIBA nationalities not displayed.

Panathinaikos women's basketball roster
Players
Coaches

Pos.	No.	Nat.	Name	Ht.	Age
G	1	(Greece)	Damoulaki, Georgia	1.67 m (5 ft 6 in)	22 – 10 March 2004
G	3	(Denmark)	Formann, Frida	1.80 m (5 ft 11 in)	25 – 22 January 2001
G	4	(Greece)	Stamolamprou, Anna Niki (C)	1.70 m (5 ft 7 in)	31 – 26 August 1995
PG	5	(Greece)	Touloupi, Marianthi	1.65 m (5 ft 5 in)	16 – 5 May 2010
SG	6	(Greece)	Kotoula, Fei	1.75 m (5 ft 9 in)	32 – 18 May 1994
G	8	(Finland)	Bejedi, Sara	1.66 m (5 ft 5 in)	26 – 16 June 2000
C	13	(United States)	Cave, Khadijiah	1.91 m (6 ft 3 in)	31 – 19 February 1995
C	14	(Greece)	Alexia, Diamanto	1.87 m (6 ft 2 in)	22 – 25 June 2004
F	18	(Greece)	Chatzileonti, Ioanna	1.88 m (6 ft 2 in)	24 – 5 January 2002
G	21	(Greece)	Krimili, Ioanna	1.78 m (5 ft 10 in)	25 – 16 July 2001
SF	22	(Greece)	Chatzigiakoumi, Anthoula	1.85 m (6 ft 1 in)	32 – 22 November 1993
G	23	(United States) (Azerbaijan)	Carter, Arica	1.75 m (5 ft 9 in)	30 – 19 July 1996
PG	44	(Greece)	Militsopoulou, Alexandra	1.70 m (5 ft 7 in)	15 – 20 April 2011
C	77	(United States)	Prince, Sedona	2.01 m (6 ft 7 in)	26 – 12 May 2000

Head coach

- (Turkey) Selen Erdem

Assistant coach(es)

- (Greece) Antonis Botis
- (Greece) Vassilis Papangelakis

Athletic trainer(s)

- (Greece) Olga Chatzinikolaou

Legend

- (C) Team captain
- Injured

- Roster
Updated: July 7, 2026

=== Depth chart ===
Pos.	Starting 5	Bench 1	Bench 2
C	Sedona Prince	Diamanto Alexia
PF	Khadijiah Cave	Ioanna Chatzileonti
SF	Frida Formann	Anthoula Chatzigiakoumi
SG	Arica Carter	Anna Niki Stamolamprou	Fei Kotoula
PG	Sara Bejedi	Ioanna Krimili	Georgia Damoulaki

== Honours ==
- Greek Championship
  - Winner (5): 1997–98, 1999–00, 2004–05, 2012–13, 2020–21
- Greek Cup
  - Winner (3): 1999–00, 2022–23, 2023–24
- Double (unofficial)
  - Winners (1): 1999–00
- Greek A2 Championship
  - Winner (1): 2018–19
- EuroLeague Women
  - top-16 (1): 2000–01
- Ronchetti Cup
  - Quarter-finals (1): 1997–98
- EuroCup
  - Quarter-finals (1): 2025–26

== Season by season ==
Season	Tier	League	Pos.	Greek Cup	European competitions		GWBL Record	EC Record
2020–21	1	GWBL	1st	Cancelled due to COVID-19			12–2	
2021–22	1	GWBL	Runner-up	Semifinalists	2 EuroCup Women	R32	14–2	2–4
2022–23	1	GWBL	Runner-up	Winners	2 EuroCup Women	R32	21–1	4–4
2023–24	1	GWBL	Runner-up	Winners	2 EuroCup Women	R32	19–1	4–4
2024–25	1	GWBL	3rd	Semifinalists	2 EuroCup Women	GS	14–6	0–6
2025–26	1	GWBL	Runner-up	Semifinalists	2 EuroCup Women	QF	19–1	7–5

== Notable players ==
- (Belarus) Yelena Leuchanka
- (Bulgaria) Eva Guneva
- (Croatia) Kornelija Kvesić
- (Denmark) Julianna Okosun
- (Greece) Olga Chatzinikolaou
- (Greece) (Cyprus) Eleanna Christinaki
- (Greece) Athina Christoforaki
- (Greece) (United States) Sam Galanopoulos
- (Greece) (United States) Jacki Gemelos
- (Greece) Lila Hatzioridou
- (Greece) Dimitra Kalentzou
- (Greece) Viktoria Klantzou
- (Greece) Afroditi Kosma
- (Greece) Anastasia Kostaki
- (Greece) Lolita Lymoura
- (Greece) Aristea Maglara
- (Greece) Evanthia Maltsi
- (Greece) Roula Mouli
- (Greece) Nena Nikolaidou
- (Greece) (Canada) Orthoula Papadakou
- (Greece) Afentra Papadimou
- (Greece) Dimitra Papamichael
- (Greece) Pinelopi Pavlopoulou
- (Greece) Ismini Prapa
- (Greece) Yasemi Samantura
- (Greece) Katerina Sotiriou
- (Greece) Artemis Spanou
- (Greece) Katerina Spatharou
- (Greece) Evdokia Stamati
- (Greece) Alexia Trialoni
- (Greece) Valanti Tsompanaki
- (Greece) Elena Vlani
- (Latvia) Kristīne Vītola
- (North Macedonia) Stojna Vangelovska
- (Romania) Gabriela Mărginean
- (Serbia) Jasmina Ilić
- (United States) (Greece) Niky Avery
- (United States) Jillian Alleyne
- (United States) Erin Batth
- (United States) Jaelyn Brown
- (United States) Kim Butler
- (United States) Heidi Horton
- (United States) Mandi Carver
- (United States) Claire Coggins
- (United States) Diana Delva
- (United States) Jennifer Derevjanik
- (United States) Feyonda Fitzgerald
- (United States) Tracy Gahan
- (United States) Michele Van Gorp
- (United States) Vicky Hall
- (United States) Sequoia Holmes
- (United States) Brandie Hoskins
- (United States) Yvette Jarvis
- (United States) Kelly Komara
- (United States) Giuliana Mendiola
- (United States) Kolby Morgan
- (United States) Jordan Murphree
- (United States) Casey Nash
- (United States) Monique Oliver
- (United States) Morgan Pullins
- (United States) Kristen Rasmussen
- (United States) Chastity Reed
- (United States) Crystal Robinson
- (United States) Trisha Skibbe
- (United States) Chelsie Schweers
- (United States) Erin Thorn
- (United States) Lindsey Wilson
- (United States) Kirstyn Wright

Completed list of former Panathinaikos Women players by Eurobasket.com

== Notable coaches ==
- Takis Koroneos
- Nikos Marinos
- Yasemi Samantura
- Giorgos Zevgolis
- Eleni Kapogianni

== Champion rosters ==
Season	League	Cup	Europe	Coach	Roster
1997–98	Champion	Last 4	Ronchetti Cup; Last 8	Giorgos Zevgolis	Dimitra Kalentzou, Nena Nikolaidou, Tammie Jenkins, Alexia Trialoni, Valanti Tsompanaki, Afentra Papadimou, Dimitra Papamichael
1999–00	Champion	Winner	Ronchetti Cup; Last 32	Yasemi Samantura	Nena Nikolaidou, Michele Van Gorp, Alexia Trialoni, Crystal Robinson, Afentra Papadimou, Dimitra Papamichael, Valanti Tsompanaki, Dimitra Kalentzou
2004–05	Champion	3rd place	No tournament	Nikos Marinos	Nena Nikolaidou, Evdokia Stamati, Viktoria Klantzou, Tracy Gahan, Stavroula Gritzali, Trisha Skibbe, Sonia Dafkou, Anthi Papaelia, Maria Gialitaki, Danai Matsioula
2012–13	Champion	Last 4	No tournament	Yasemi Samantura	Anastasia Slouka, Dimitra Kalentzou, Diana Delva, Elena Vlani, Aristea Maglara, Ioanna Diela, Stauria Koniali, Eleanna Christinaki
2020–21	Champion	Cancelled due to COVID-19	No tournament	Eleni Kapogianni	Iouliti Lymoura, Ioanna Diela, Roula Mouli, Aspasia Kalampakou, Chastity Reed, Kolby Morgan, Fei Kotoula, Argiro Skoubaki, Xenia Helioti, Styliani Panagiotopoulou, Vasiliki Nektaria Ioannou, Angeliki Ziaka, Panagiota Zarri, Yelena Leuchanka, Olga Chatzinikolaou, Sharon Houston, Brooke Johnson

== Kit manufacturers and Shirt sponsors ==
Period	Kit manufacturer	Shirt partner
2014–2015	Art & Fantasy	X-Level Media Group
2015–2017	Erreà	X-Level Media Group
2015–2017	CAP Sport	
2018–2024	Macron	OPAP
2024–present	Adidas	OPAP

== Academies staff ==
Name	Position
(Greece) Makis Koutsonikolas	Academies Director
(Greece)	Coach
(Greece)	Coach

== Gallery ==
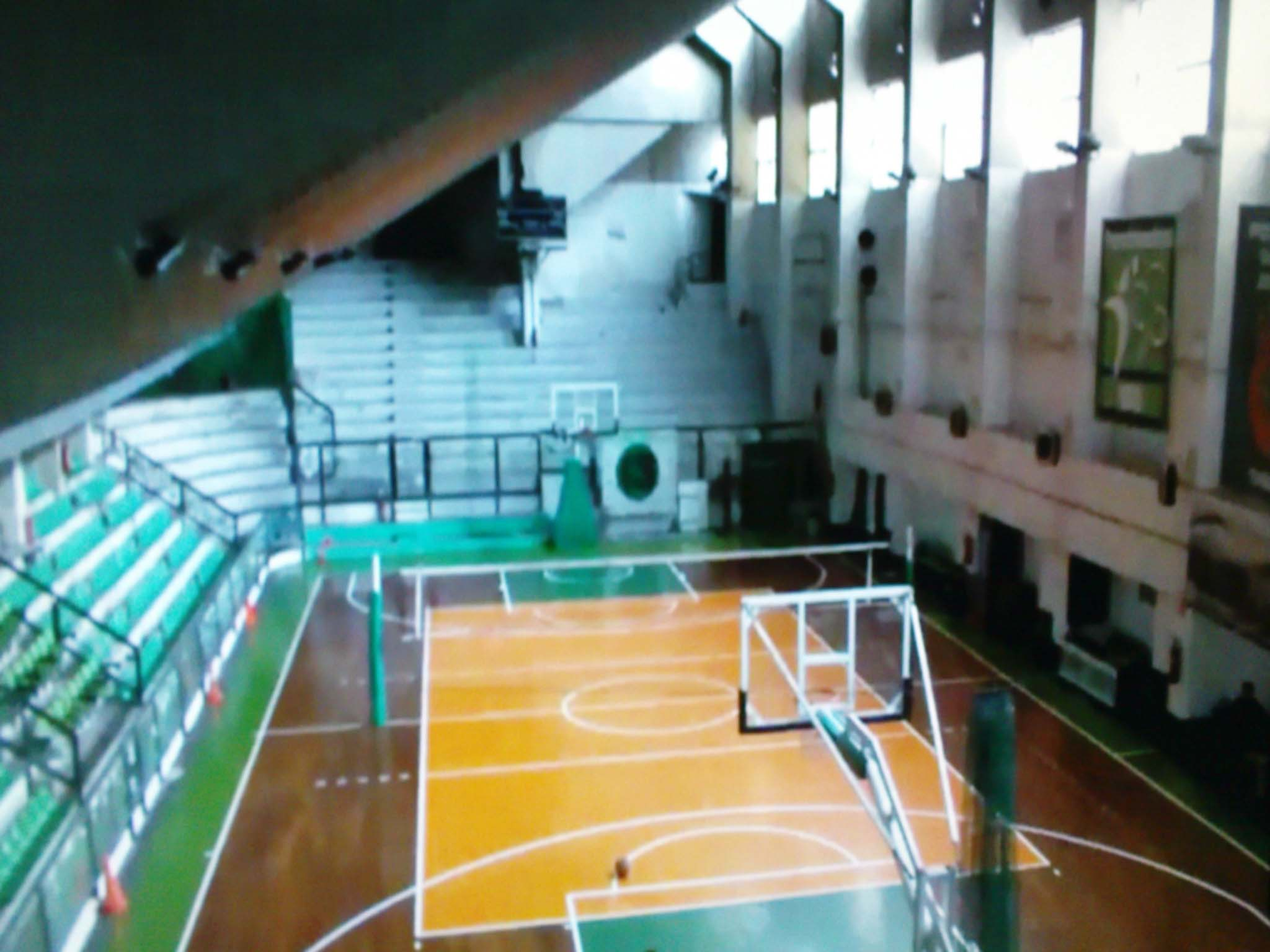
Pavlos and Thanasis Giannakopoulos Indoor Hall

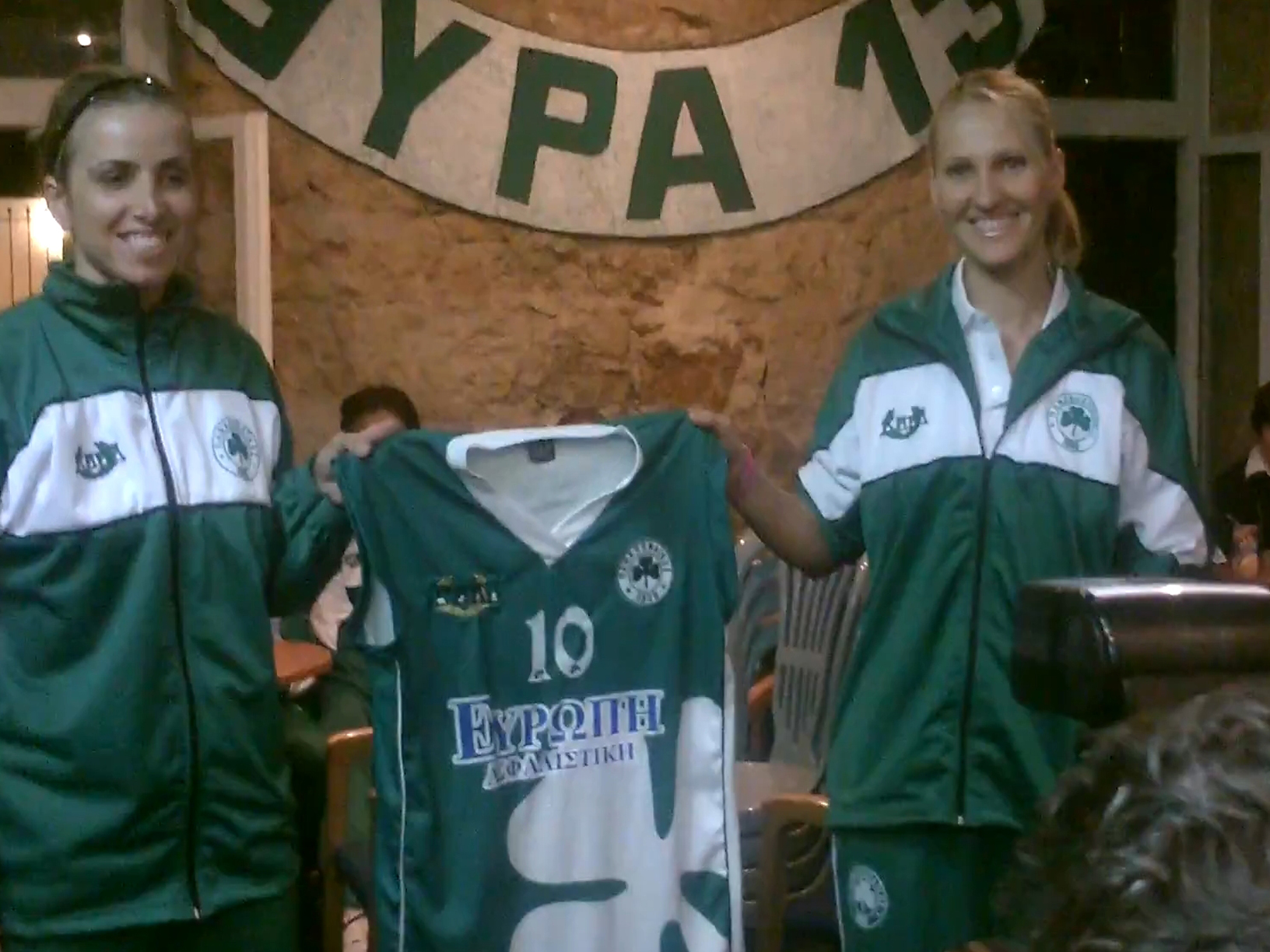
Players of the team (2011)

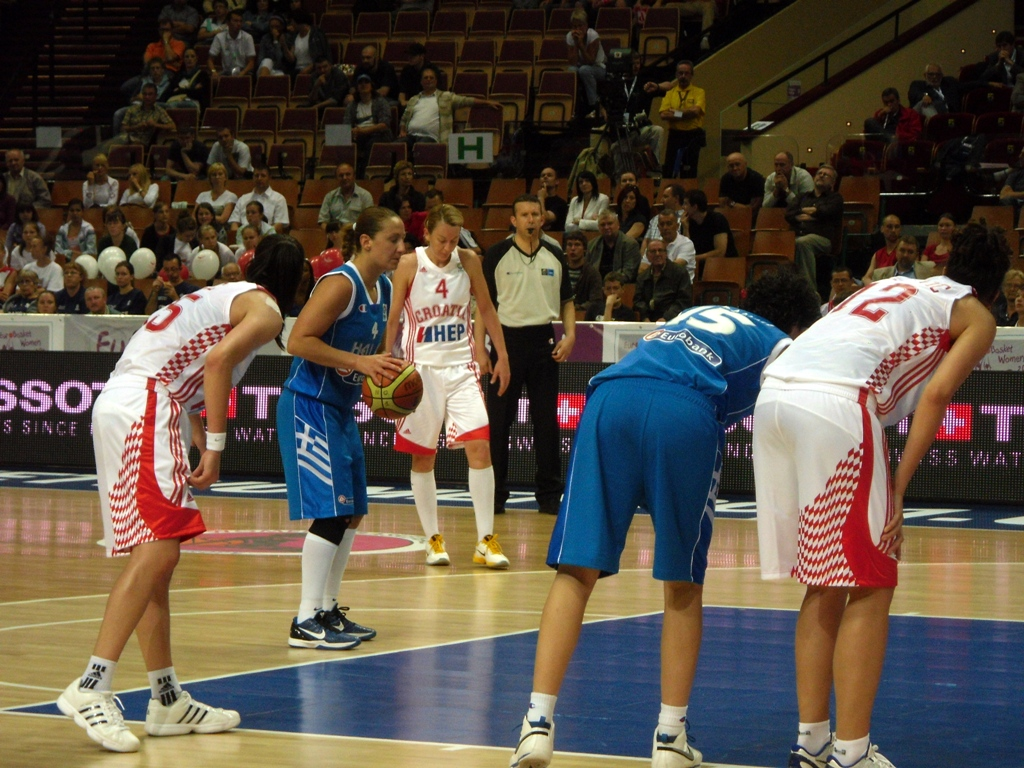
Dimitra Kalentzou with the Greece women's national basketball team

== See also ==
- Panathinaikos Men's BC
