= Soultana Chalivera =

Greek professional basketball player

Olympiacos
- Position: Shooting guard
- League: Greek Women's Basketball League; EuroCup Women

Personal information
- Born: March 5, 1985 (age 41) Niš, Serbia
- Listed height: 5 ft 10 in (1.78 m)

Soultana "Tania" Chalivera (Σουλτάνα Χαλιβέρα, born March 5, 1985) is a Greek professional basketball player who plays for Olympiacos in the Greek Women's Basketball League. She is a 1.78m shooting guard.
