= Sara Bejedi =

Finnish basketball player (born 2000)

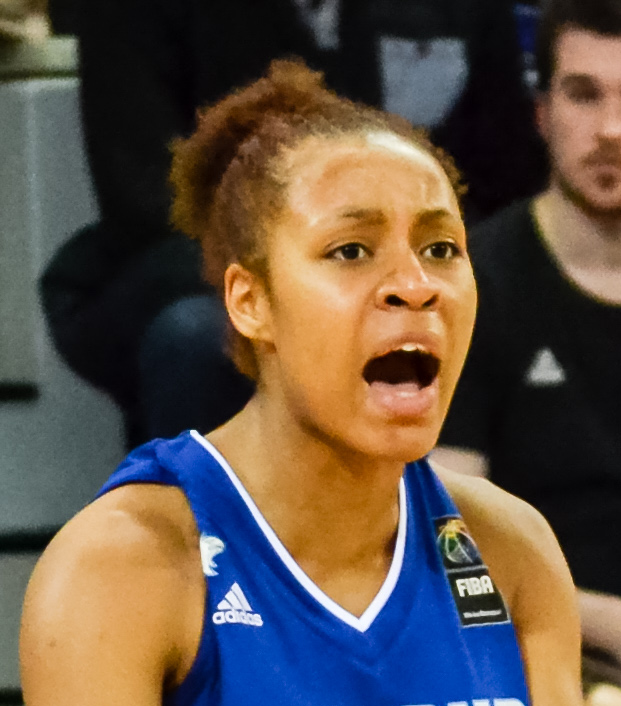
- Bejedi playing for Finland in 2018

No. 8 – Panathinaikos
- Position: Point guard
- League: Greek League

Personal information
- Born: June 18, 2000 (age 26) Espoo, Finland
- Listed height: 1.66 m (5 ft 5 in)

Career information
- High school: Helsinki Basketball Academy, (Helsinki, Finland)
- College: Arizona State (2019–2020); Florida State (2020–2024)
- Playing career: 2016–present

Career history
- 2016–2019: HBA-Märsky
- 2024–2025: Szekszárd
- 2025–2026: Botaş
- 2026–present: Panathinaikos

Career highlights
- Naisten Korisliiga Player of the Year (2019)
Medals
Representing Finland
Women's basketball
Summer World University Games
Bronze medal – third place	2021 Chengdu	Team competition

Sara Bejedi (born 18 June 2000) is a Finnish professional basketball player who plays for the Greek women's basketball team Panathinaikos of the Greek Women's Basketball League.

== Early life and career ==
Bejedi was born in Espoo, Finland, to a Moroccan mother and Cameroonian father, as the youngest of five siblings. She speaks six languages fluently: Finnish, English, Swedish, French, German, Arabic, and has studied also Spanish. She started basketball with Leppävaaran Pyrintö in Leppävaara, Espoo, when she was 11 years old. Later she joined Helsinki Basketball Academy and played for HBA-Märsky team.

In 2016, she was named the Basketball Without Borders Women Europe camp MVP.

In 2019, she was named the Player of the Season in Naisten Korisliiga.

== Professional career ==
After spending five seasons in the United States in college, Bejedi returned to Europe for the 2024–25 season and signed her first professional contract with Hungarian team Szekszárd. She represented Szekszárd in EuroLeague qualifiers and in EuroCup.

In September 2025, she signed with Botaş SK in the Turkish Women's Super League (KBSL).

== National team career ==
Bejedi has played 79 games for Finnish youth national teams.

In 2023, she played for Finland at the postponed 2021 Summer World University Games where they won the bronze medal.

She debuted with the Finland women's national basketball team in 2018.
