= Kostas Missas =

Greek basketball player and coach

Kostas Missas Κώστας Μίσσας
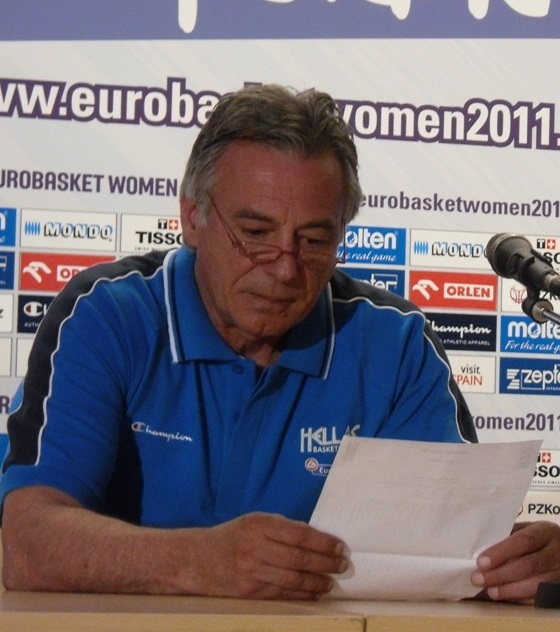
- Missas at a press conference in 2011

Olympiacos
- Position: Head coach

Personal information
- Born: August 15, 1953 (age 73)

Career information
- Playing career: 1968–1989
- Coaching career: 1989–present

Career history

Playing
- 1968–1986: Panionios
- 1986–1988: Panathinaikos
- 1988–1989: Panionios

Coaching
- 1989: AE Peramatos
- 1989–1993: Panionios (assistant)
- 1993–1994: Panionios
- 1994–1995: Peristeri
- 1994–1995: Cyprus
- 1996–1998: Papagou
- 1998–1999: Apollon Patras
- 2000–2001: Dafnis
- 2001–2002: KAOD
- 2002: Panionios
- 2004–2006: AGE Chalkida
- 2007–2011: Greece women
- 2009–2014: Greece Under-20
- 2014–2017: Promitheas Patras (academies)
- 2016–2017: Olympiacos women (technical director)
- 2017: Greece
- 2017–2018: Olympiacos women

Career highlights
- As a player: 2× Greek 2nd Division champion (1974, 1981)
Medals
Men's basketball
Representing Greece
European U-20 Championship
Gold medal – first place	2009 Greece	Under-20
Silver medal – second place	2010 Croatia	Under-20

Konstantinos "Kostas" Missas (alternate spelling: Constandinos, Costas) (Greek: Κωνσταντίνος "Κώστας" Μίσσας; born August 15, 1953, in Greece) is a Greek former professional basketball player, and current professional basketball coach. He was the head coach of Olympiacos women basketball team. He also coached the Greece men's national basketball team at the 2017 FIBA EuroBasket. During his playing career, he was nicknamed "The General".

== Playing career ==
=== Club playing career ===
In his club playing career, Missas played with the Greek clubs Panionios (1968–1986, 1988–1989), and Panathinaikos (1986–1988). With Panionios, he won the Greek 2nd Division twice, in 1974 and 1981. With Panionios, he also played in the European-wide 3rd-tier level league, the FIBA Korać Cup.

He also played in the Greek Cup final in 1977, while with Panionios. With Panathinaikos, he played in the European-wide 2nd-tier level league, the FIBA European Cup Winners' Cup (later called FIBA Saporta Cup). In his club career, he scored a total of 5,005 points, in 325 games played, for a scoring average of 15.4 points per game, in Greece's top-tier level Greek Basket League.

=== Greece men's national team ===
Missas played with Greek junior national team at the 1972 FIBA Europe Under-18 Championship. Missas was also a member of the Greece men's national basketball team. He played with Greece at the 1984 Summer Olympics qualification tournament. In total, he played with Greece's senior national team in 45 games.

== Coaching career ==
=== Club coaching career ===
In his head coaching career, Missas has coached the following club teams: Panionios, Peristeri, Papagou, Apollon Patras, Dafnis, KAOD, Panionios, and AGE Chalkida.

=== National teams coaching career ===
Missas has been the head coach of the senior men's Cypriot national basketball team, the senior Greek women's national basketball team, and the Greek men's national under-20 basketball team. While coaching the Greek men's Under-20 national team, he won the gold medal at the 2009 FIBA Europe Under-20 Championship, and the silver medal at the 2010 FIBA Europe Under-20 Championship.

In June 2017, he became the head coach of the Greece men's national basketball team. He coached Greece at the EuroBasket 2017, where he reached the quarterfinal stage, eventually losing the ticket to the semifinals to Russia.
