= Anastasia Gkotzi =

Greek basketball player

Olympiacos
- Position: Guard
- League: Greek Women's Basketball League; EuroCup Women

Personal information
- Born: April 4, 1987 (age 39) Patra, Greece
- Listed height: 5 ft 7 in (1.70 m)

Anastasia "Natasa" Gkotzi (Αναστασία Γκοτζή, born April 4, 1987) is a Greek professional basketball player who plays for Olympiacos. She was also member of the Greece women's national basketball team in the 2015 Eurobasket.
