= Kristīne Vītola =

Latvian basketball player

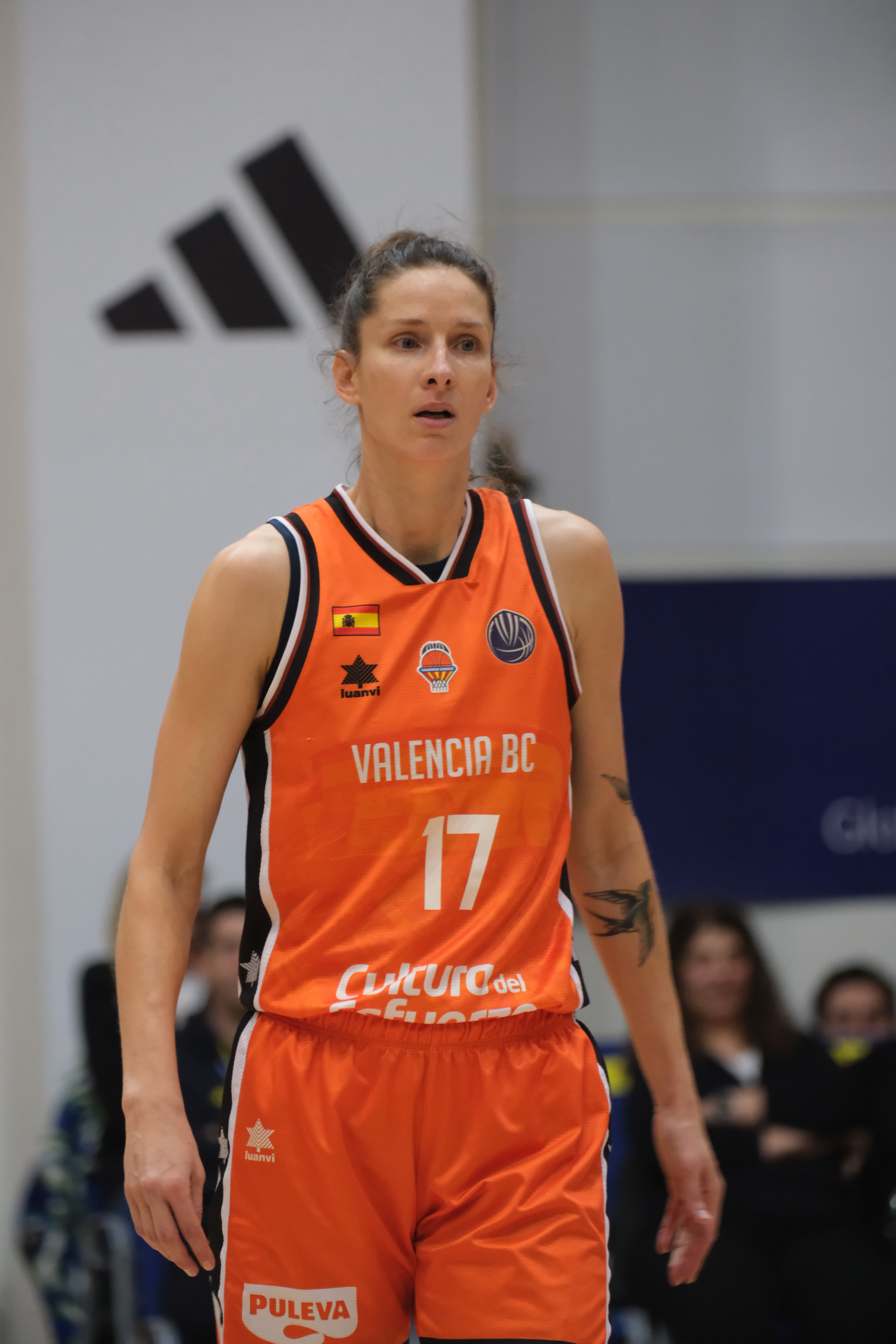

Personal information
- Born: 2 June 1991 (age 35) Riga, Latvia
- Listed height: 6 ft 5 in (1.96 m)
- Listed weight: 181 lb (82 kg)

Career information
- College: UTEP (2014)
- WNBA draft: 2014: undrafted
- Position: Power forward
- Number: 17

Career history
- 2014–2015: Stadium Casablanca
- 2015–2016: Perfumerías Avenida
- 2016–2017: Galatasaray SK
- 2017–2018: Arka Gdynia
- 2018–2019: TTT Riga
- 2019–2020: Perfumerías Avenida
- 2020: Elazığ İl Özel İdarespor
- 2020: Fenerbahçe S.K.
- 2020–2021: DVTK Miskolc
- 2021–2022: Olympiacos
- 2022–2023: Virtus Ragusa
- 2023–2024: Olympiacos
- 2024–2025: Valencia Basket
- 2025–2026: Panathinaikos

Kristīne Vītola (born 2 June 1991) is a Latvian basketball player for Panathinaikos and the Latvian national team.

She participated at the EuroBasket Women 2017.

== University of Texas at El Paso statistics ==
Ratios
Year	Team	GP	FG%	3P%	FT%	RBG	APG	BPG	SPG	PPG
2009-10	UTEP	32	40.7%	27.9%	69.8%	3.63	0.41	0.69	0.34	5.56
2010-11	UTEP	30	31.3%	23.5%	70.6%	2.93	0.67	0.80	0.37	3.73
2011-12	UTEP	32	42.5%	15.2%	75.5%	5.50	0.81	1.47	0.59	5.75
2012-13	UTEP	3	60.0%	40.0%	84.2%	8.33	0.33	1.33	1.33	16.00
2013-14	UTEP	37	50.3%	26.5%	77.0%	5.76	1.27	2.43	0.84	11.24
Career		134	43.8%	24.4%	75.4%	4.61	0.80	1.40	0.57	7.00

Totals
Year	Team	GP	FG	FGA	3P	3PA	FT	FTA	REB	A	BK	ST	PTS
2009-10	UTEP	32	68	167	12	43	30	43	116	13	22	11	178
2010-11	UTEP	30	40	128	8	34	24	34	88	20	24	11	112
2011-12	UTEP	32	71	167	5	33	37	49	176	26	47	19	184
2012-13	UTEP	3	15	25	2	5	16	19	25	1	4	4	48
2013-14	UTEP	37	148	294	13	49	107	139	213	47	90	31	416
Career		134	342	781	40	164	214	284	618	107	187	76	938
