= Kyra Lambert =

American basketball player (born 1996)

Olympiacos
- Position: Guard
- League: Greek Women's Basketball League

Personal information
- Born: December 6, 1996 (age 29) Guam
- Listed height: 5 ft 9 in (1.75 m)

Career information
- High school: Steele (Cibolo, Texas, U.S.); Clemens (Schertz, Texas, U.S.)
- College: Duke (2015–2020); Texas (2020–2021)
- Playing career: 2015–present

Career history
- 2021–2022: Toulouse Métropole Basket
- 2022–2023: TTT Riga
- 2023: Tauranga Whai
- 2023–2024: Slávia Banská Bystrica
- 2024: Karşıyaka S.K.
- 2024–2025: Olympiacos
- 2025: Indiana Fever
- 2025–2026: Basket Lattes
- 2026–present: Olympiacos

Career highlights
- McDonald's All-American (2015)
- Stats at WNBA.com
- Stats at Basketball Reference

Kyra Michelle Lambert (born December 6, 1996) is an American-Slovak professional basketball player for Olympiacos of the Greek Women's Basketball League. She is also a member of the Slovakia women's national basketball team. She played college basketball for the Duke Blue Devils and Texas Longhorns. Lambert won a Greek league championship with Olympiacos and played in one game with the Indiana Fever of the Women's National Basketball Association (WNBA), both in 2025.

== Early life ==
Lambert was born December 6, 1996, in Guam. She is one of three siblings. Her parents are United States Air Force veterans. The family moved to San Antonio, Texas, when Lambert was two years old.

Lambert spent her first two years of high school at Steele in Cibolo, Texas, before transferring to Samuel Clemens High School in Schertz. She played on the basketball teams at both schools, appearing in the 2013 state championship with Steele, and additionally competed in track and cross country at Steele. When a committee of school principals ruled that she transferred for athletic reasons, Lambert lost a year of varsity basketball eligibility and was forced to play on Clemens's junior varsity team in her junior year. Lambert, an honor roll student, had said that she transferred to join the International Baccalaureate program at Clemens. In her senior year, she was named an All-American and was invited to play in the 2015 McDonald's All-American Girls Game while averaging 25.8 points on the season. Clemens retired Lambert's No. 15 jersey after her senior season. Ranked the ninth overall college basketball recruit in the country by ESPN, she initially committed to join the Texas A&M Aggies before changing her commitment to the Duke Blue Devils after a visit to the Duke University campus.

== College career ==
As a freshman with the Duke Blue Devils in 2015–2016, Lambert started in 23 of 32 games, averaging 6.2 points, 2.8 rebounds, 2.5 assists, and 1.1 steals per game. In the 2016–2017 season, she averaged 7.8 points, 3.7 rebounds, 3.5 assists, and 1.7 steals per game while starting in all 33 games. She tore her ACL in the first round of the 2017 NCAA Division I women's basketball tournament, ending her season and forcing her to miss the 2017–2018 season as well. She suffered another torn ACL before the 2018–2019 season and missed a second consecutive season. After graduating from Duke with a degree in cultural anthropology and environmental science, she returned to the Blue Devils as a graduate student in 2019–2020. Playing limited time early in the season as she continued to recover from her knee injury, she started in the final 21 games of the season, averaging 5.8 points, 3.3 rebounds, 1.7 assists, and 1.2 steals per game for the season. She obtained a master's degree in management studies from Duke in 2020.

Lambert transferred to play for the Texas Longhorns for the 2020–2021 season. She started in 27 of 29 games, averaging 7.1 points, 3.0 rebounds, 3.1 assists, and 1.2 steals per game. The Longhorns advanced as far as the Elite Eight in the 2021 NCAA Division I women's basketball tournament.

== Professional career ==
=== Overseas ===
After finishing her college career, Lambert played for several professional basketball teams overseas, including Karşıyaka S.K. in Turkey, Slávia Banská Bystrica in Slovakia, Tauranga Whai in New Zealand, TTT Riga in Latvia, Toulouse Métropole Basket in France, and Olympiacos in Greece, winning a Greek Women's Basketball League championship with Olympiacos in 2025. She was additionally named EuroCup's Guard of the Year. Lambert played for Basket Lattes Montpellier Agglomération for the 2025–26 season of the Ligue Féminine de Basketball (LFB), averaging 7.8 points, 2.5 rebounds, 3.6 assists, and 1.0 steals per game; the team reached the league semifinals. She re-signed to Olympiacos for the 2026–27 season.

=== WNBA ===
Amid injuries to guards Caitlin Clark, Aari McDonald, and Sydney Colson, the Indiana Fever of the Women's National Basketball Association (WNBA) signed Lambert to a seven-day contract on August 14, 2025. She made her WNBA debut against the Connecticut Sun on August 17 and was released by the Fever on August 18.

== Personal life ==
Lambert became a naturalized citizen of Slovakia on September 23, 2025.

== Career statistics ==
Legend
GP	Games played	GS	Games started	MPG	Minutes per game	RPG	Rebounds per game
APG	Assists per game	SPG	Steals per game	BPG	Blocks per game	PPG	Points per game
TO	Turnovers per game	FG%	Field-goal percentage	3P%	3-point field-goal percentage	FT%	Free-throw percentage
**Bold**	Career best	°	League leader

=== WNBA ===
WNBA regular season statistics
Year	Team	GP	GS	MPG	FG%	3P%	FT%	RPG	APG	SPG	BPG	TO	PPG
2025	Indiana	1	0	1.0	–	–	–	0.0	0.0	0.0	0.0	0.0	0.0

=== College ===
NCAA statistics
Year	Team	GP	GS	MPG	FG%	3P%	FT%	RPG	APG	SPG	BPG	TO	PPG
2015–16	Duke	32	23	27.3	.380	.321	.656	2.8	2.5	1.1	**0.2**	1.9	6.2
2016–17	Duke	**33**	**33**	30.1	**.436**	**.397**	.736	**3.7**	**3.5**	**1.7**	**0.2**	1.8	**7.8**
2017–18	Duke	0	0	Did not play due to injury									
2018–19	Duke	0	0	Did not play due to injury									
2019–20	Duke	30	21	25.3	.401	.338	**.739**	3.3	1.7	1.2	0.1	**1.2**	5.8
2020–21	Texas	29	27	**30.9**	.355	.356	.675	3.0	3.1	1.2	0.0	1.3	7.1
**Career**		124	104	28.4	.394	.353	.695	3.2	2.7	1.3	0.1	1.6	6.8
