= Jasmina Ilić =

Serbian basketball player

Jasmina Aleksandrov
Personal information
- Born: April 11, 1985 (age 41) Bečej, SFR Yugoslavia
- Listed height: 1.89 m (6 ft 2 in)

Career information
- College: Colorado Buffaloes (2003–2007)
- WNBA draft: 2007: undrafted
- Playing career: 2007–2010
- Position: Shooting guard / small forward

Career history
- 2007: Vojvodina
- 2007–2008: ESB Villeneuve-d'Ascq
- 2008: ICIM Arad
- 2008–2009: TSV Wasserburg
- 2009–2010: Panathinaikos

Jasmina Aleksandrov , maiden Ilić, (Serbian Cyrillic: Јасмина Илић Александров; born 11 April 1985 in Bečej, SFR Yugoslavia) is a Serbian former professional basketball player. During the 2009–10 season she played for Panathinaikos of Athens. Jasmina appeared in the Greek edition of popular magazine Maxim, also was on the cover of Serbians Playboy magazine edition, as well as on the cover of Esquire Magazine Serbia. After retirement from professional basketball Jasmina started fitness projects in Serbia and got into CrossFit and Spartan Race competitions. Jasmina participated in three Spartan Race world championships representing Serbia.

Jasmina is a vegan and actively involved in environmental projects in Serbia. She is owner and coach at Hangar training and performance center and Under Armour brand ambassador.

== Personal life ==
Her father Predrag was professional football player and her mother Verica was a professional handball player. Her husband is Nemanja Aleksandrov, Serbian basketball player. They were married in 2011.
