= Lykendra Johnson =

American basketball player

Lykendra Dania Johnson
No. 12 – Olympiacos Piraeus
- Position: Center
- League: Greek Women's Basketball League; EuroCup Women

Personal information
- Born: March 20, 1989 (age 37) Chicago, Illinois
- Listed height: 6 ft 2 in (1.88 m)
- Listed weight: 210 lb (95 kg)

Career information
- High school: Trinity (River Forest, Illinois)
- College: Michigan State (2008–2012)
- WNBA draft: 2012: undrafted
- Playing career: 2007–2012

Career history
- 2015–2019: Olympiacos
- Faros Keratsínion Women’s Basketball: 2019-2020
- Olympiacos: 2020-2021

Career highlights
- Big Ten Defensive Player of the Year (2011); Big Ten All-Defensive Team (2011); First-team All-Big Ten (2011); Big Ten All-Freshman Team (2009)

Lykendra Johnson (born March 20, 1989) is a retired American professional basketball player for Olympiacos of the Greek Women's Basketball League. She has two children.

== Career ==
She was named the Big Ten Defensive Player of the Year in 2011.

== Michigan State statistics ==
Legend
GP	Games played	GS	Games started	MPG	Minutes per game
FG%	Field goal percentage	3P%	3-point field goal percentage	FT%	Free throw percentage
RPG	Rebounds per game	APG	Assists per game	SPG	Steals per game
BPG	Blocks per game	PPG	Points per game	**Bold**	Career high

Year	Team	GP	Points	FG%	3P%	FT%	RPG	APG	SPG	BPG	PPG
2008–09	Michigan State	**33**	216	45.0%	20.0%	75.2%	6.0	1.6	1.1	0.8	6.5
2009–10	Michigan State	**33**	291	**49.2%**	**33.3%**	58.1%	7.6	1.4	1.6	1.0	8.8
2010–11	Michigan State	**33**	**390**	48.3%	**33.3%**	**63.9%**	**8.9**	**1.7**	**2.4**	**1.3**	**11.8**
2011–12	Michigan State	32	345	43.7%	27.1%	57.4%	8.6	1.1	1.8	1.3	10.8
Career		131	1242	46.6%	30.4%	63.0%	7.8	1.4	1.7	1.1	9.5
