= Maria Roza Boni =

Greek professional basketball player

Olympiacos
- Position: Shooting guard
- League: Greek Women's Basketball League; EuroCup Women

Personal information
- Born: September 2, 1986 (age 40) Rodos, Greece
- Listed height: 5 ft 11 in (1.80 m)

Maria Roza Boni (Μαρία-Ρόζα Μπόνη, born September 2, 1986) is a Greek professional basketball player who plays for Olympiacos in the Greek Women's Basketball League.
