= Anthi Balta =

Greek professional basketball player

Olympiacos
- Position: Guard
- League: Greek Women's Basketball League; EuroCup Women

Personal information
- Born: October 1, 1987 (age 39) Cholargos, Greece
- Listed height: 5 ft 10 in (1.78 m)

Anthoula "Anthi" Balta (Ανθή Μπαλτά; born October 1, 1987) is a Greek professional basketball player who plays for Olympiacos in the Greek Women's Basketball League.
