= Panionios Women's Basketball =

Greek basketball team

Panionios
- Leagues: Greek Championship; Greek Cup
- Founded: 1947
- Arena: Nea Smyrni Indoor Hall
- Capacity: 2,000
- Location: Nea Smyrni, Athens, Greece
- Team colors
- Head coach: Angelos Tsikliras
Home	Away

Panionios Women's Basketball is the women's basketball department of Panionios, the Greek multi-sport club based in Nea Smyrni. The first basketball department of the club was founded in 1919 and was one of the first in Greece. The women's department in turn was established in the post-war period. Its last reconstitution took place in the late 1990s. The club plays in A2 Ethniki (2nd tier) but recently it has played in A1 Ethniki. They have won one Greek Championship, in 2007.

== History ==
Panionios Women's basketball team was founded in 1947. It took part in the local championship of Athens-Piraeus since those years there wasn't a Panhellenic women championship. The club ceased its activities for some years but it returned in action in the late 1990s. Panionios achieved to win the Panhellenic championship immediately after its promotion to A1 Ethniki. It is the only time that a Greek team wins a championship coming from a second division. The next years, Panionios is weakened and the current season it plays in A2 Ethniki.

=== Recent seasons ===
Season	Division	Place	Notes
2003-04	Beta Ethniki	1st	Promoted to A2
2005-06	A2 Ethniki	2nd	Promoted to A1
2006-07	A1 Ethniki	1st	
2007-08	A1 Ethniki	2nd	
2008-09	A1 Ethniki	8th	
2009-10	A1 Ethniki	7th	
2010-11	A1 Ethniki	5th	
2011-12	A1 Ethniki	3rd	
2012-13	A1 Ethniki	11th	Relegated to A2
2013-14	A2 Ethniki	6th	
2014-15	A2 Ethniki	4th	
2015-16	A2 Ethniki	2nd	Promoted to A1
2016-17	A1 Ethniki	9th	
2017-18	A1 Ethniki	3rd	
2018-19	A1 Ethniki	8th	
2019-20	A2 Ethniki	5th	

== Honours ==
- Greek Women's Basketball League
  - Winners (1): 2007
  - Runners-up (1): 2008
- Greek Women's Basketball Cup
  - Runners-up (1): 2017

== Roster ==
Note: Flags indicate national team eligibility at FIBA-sanctioned events. Players may hold other non-FIBA nationalities not displayed.

Panionios Women's Basketball roster
Players
Coaches

Pos.	No.	Nat.	Name	Ht.	Wt.	Age
G	4	(United States)	Petersen, Lexi	1.81 m (5 ft 11 in)		32 – 12 June 1993
G	5	(Greece)	Tsika, Elli	1.68 m (5 ft 6 in)
F/C	6	(United States)	Healy, Katie	1.85 m (6 ft 1 in)		31 – 7 August 1994
G	7	(Greece)	Tsiadi, Ioanna	1.75 m (5 ft 9 in)
G	8	(Greece)	Botsari, Alexia	1.78 m (5 ft 10 in)		42 – 28 March 1983
F	9	(Greece)	Stabourlou, Polina	1.78 m (5 ft 10 in)
G/F	10	(Greece)	Theodoromanolaki, Despina	1.81 m (5 ft 11 in)		34 – 23 December 1991
G	11	(Greece)	Stefanidou, Julie	1.72 m (5 ft 8 in)
PF	12	(Greece)	Pateraki, Ria	1.85 m (6 ft 1 in)		32 – 28 December 1993
F/C	13	(Greece)	Grigoriou, Sofia	1.84 m (6 ft 0 in)
G	15	(Greece)	Machla, Kelly	1.78 m (5 ft 10 in)
F/C	17	(Greece)	Mitsi, Athina	1.85 m (6 ft 1 in)

Head coach

- (Greece) Angelos Tsikliras

Assistant coach(es)

- (Greece) Angelos Giannoulakis

Legend

- (C) Team captain
- Injured
