= Apollon Kalamarias B.C. =

Apollon Kalamarias
- Founded: 1959 (men's); 1968 (women's)
- Location: Thessaloniki, Greece
- Team colors
Home	Away

Apollon Kalamarias B.C. is the basketball section of Apollon Kalamarias, the Greek multisport club based in Kalamaria, Thessaloniki. The women's team stands out from the club because has won two championships and one cup.

== Women's team ==
The women's team of Apollon Kalamarias was founded in 1968, nine years after founding of men's team. It is the most successful section of Apollon since it is the only department that has won Panhellenic titles. It is also the only women's basketball team from Thessaloniki that has won a Greek championship or Greek cup. Apollon Kalamarias has won two championship and one cup. The current season the club plays in A2 Ethniki women's.

=== Recent seasons ===
Season	Division	Place	Notes
2006-07	A2 Ethniki	8th	
2007-08	A2 Ethniki	1st	promoted to A1
2008-09	A1 Ethniki	4th	
2009-10	A1 Ethniki	11th	relegated to A2
2010-11	A2 Ethniki	1st	promoted to A1
2011-12	A1 Ethniki	11th	relegated to A2
2012-13	A2 Ethniki	5th	
2013-14	A2 Ethniki	9th	
2014-15	A2 Ethniki	6th	
2015-16	A2 Ethniki	5th	
2016-17	A2 Ethniki	3rd	
2017-18	A2 Ethniki	7th	
2018-19	A2 Ethniki	5th	
2019-20	A2 Ethniki	-	season suspended due to COVID-19 pandemic
2020-21	A2 Ethniki		

== Men's team ==
Men's team of Apollon kalamarias was founded in 1959, thanks to initiatives of Giorgos Meliadis. Apollon played for many years in Gamma Ethniki basketball. The most successful period of the club was the period 2009-2011 when Apollon played for three consecutive seasons in Beta Ethniki Basketball. The current season, Apollon played in Greek C Basket League.

== Titles ==
Women's team

- Greek Women's Basketball League
  - Winner (2): 1974, 1992
- Greek Women's Basketball Cup
  - Winner (1): 1997
