= Stella Fouraki =

Greek professional basketball player

Olympiacos
- Position: Forward
- League: Greek Women's Basketball League; EuroCup Women

Personal information
- Born: March 24, 1994 (age 32) Greece
- Listed height: 6 ft 2 in (1.88 m)

Styliani "Stella" Fouraki (Greek: Στέλλα Φουράκη; born March 24, 1994) is a Greek professional basketball player who plays for Olympiacos in the Greek Women's Basketball League.
