= Afroditi Kosma =

Greek basketball player

No. 13 – Olympiacos
- Position: Forward
- League: A1

Personal information
- Born: 6 June 1983 (age 43) Nikaia, Greece
- Listed height: 6 ft 1 in (1.85 m)
- Listed weight: 163 lb (74 kg)

Career information
- WNBA draft: 2005: undrafted

Afroditi Kosma (Αφροδίτη Κοσμά, born 6 June 1983), is a Greek professional basketball player who plays for Olympiacos and Greece women's national basketball team. She has represented national team in several Eurobasket Women.
