= Anna Spyridopoulou =

Greek basketball player

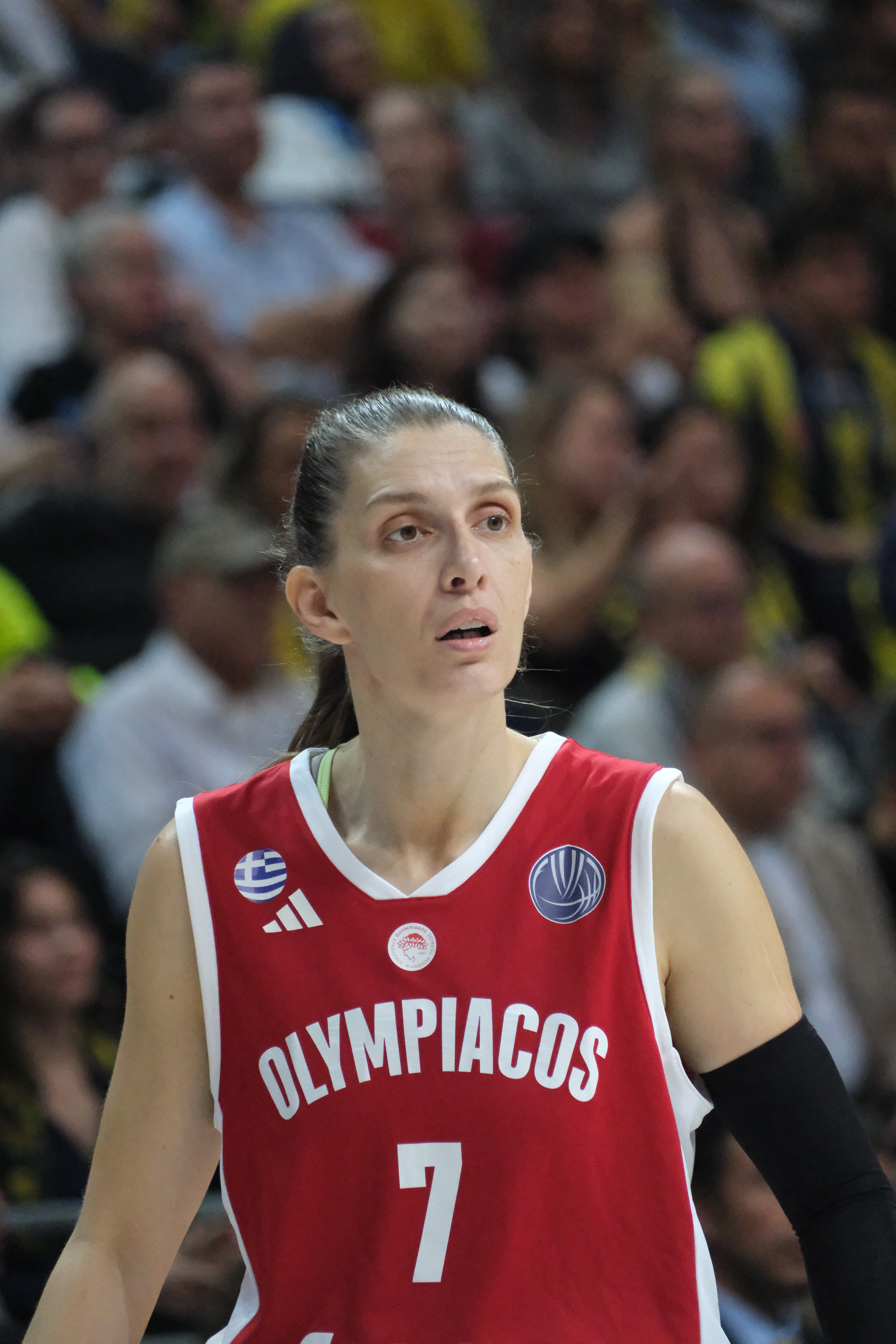

No. 7 – Sporting Athens women's basketball
- Position: Power forward
- League: A1

Personal information
- Born: 2 November 1988 (age 38) Serres, Greece
- Listed height: 6 ft 0 in (1.83 m)

Career information
- WNBA draft: 2010: undrafted

Sporting Athens women's basketball

Anna Spyridopoulou (born 2 November 1988) is a Greek professional basketball player who plays for Sporting Athens women's basketball and Greek womens 2 nd Division. She has represented national team in EuroBasket Women 2011.
