= Olympiacos women's basketball =

Olympiacos
- Nickname: Thrylos (The Legend); Erythrolefkes (The Red-Whites)
- Leagues: Greek League; EuroLeague Women
- Founded: 1947 (2015 reorganized)
- Arena: Indoor Hall kaminia
- Capacity: 12,000
- Location: Piraeus, Greece
- Team colors: Red and White
- Main sponsor: Stoiximan
- President: Michalis Kountouris
- Head coach: Ahmed Mbombo Njoya
- Team captain: Eleanna Christinaki
- Ownership: George Leriotis
- Championships: 9 Greek Championships; 6 Greek Cups; 1 Greek Super Cup
- Website: olympiacossfp.gr
Home	Away

The Olympiacos women's basketball team is the women's basketball department of the major Greek multi-sport club Olympiacos CFP, based in Piraeus. The department was initially founded in 1947, being one of the best women's basketball clubs in Greece during the 1950s and the early 1960s, when they won three Women's Division Center Championships (1956, 1958, 1959), which was the most important competition of Greek women's basketball at the time (until 1967–68 when the Greek Women's Basketball League was officially organized). The department was dissolved in the mid-1960s and after a long period of inactivity, it was reorganized in 2015.

Olympiacos is one of the most successful clubs in Greek women's basketball history, having won nine Greek League championships, a record six Greek Cups and a record six Doubles. From the start of the 2015–16 season (which was the first after its reorganization), till the 25th of October 2020, Olympiacos remainded undefeated in all official or friendly games in all domestic competitions (for more than five years), setting a world record of 137 consecutive victories (118 of which were in the Greek League), and winning five consecutive undefeated Greek League championships (2016, 2017, 2018, 2019, 2020) and four consecutive undefeated Doubles (2016, 2017, 2018, 2019 – the 2020 Greek Cup was not completed due to the COVID-19 pandemic). The world record of 137 straight wins was finally stopped on October 25, 2020, during the 2020–21 Greek League.

== Roster ==
Note: Flags indicate national team eligibility at FIBA-sanctioned events. Players may hold other non-FIBA nationalities not displayed.

Olympiacos Women's Basketball roster
Players
Coaches

Pos.	No.	Nat.	Name	Ht.	Wt.	Age
PF	7	(Greece)	Spyridopoulou, Anna	1.84 m (6 ft 0 in)		37 – 2 November 1988
SF	8	(Greece)	Karlafti, Zafeirenia	1.80 m (5 ft 11 in)		28 – 8 June 1998
PG	11	(Greece)	Nikolopoulou, Angeliki	1.78 m (5 ft 10 in)		35 – 2 May 1991
SF	21	(Greece)	Christinaki, Eleanna	1.83 m (6 ft 0 in)		29 – 16 December 1996
PG	23	(Greece)	Kollatou, Evgenia	1.83 m (6 ft 0 in)		28 – 5 March 1998

Head coach

Ahmed Mbombo Njoya

Assistant coach(es)

- (Greece) Konstantinos Kalogeropoulos

Legend

- (C) Team captain
- Injured

- Roster
Updated: May 16, 2023

=== Depth chart ===
Pos.	Starting 5	Bench 1	Bench 2	Bench 3
C	Dulcy Fankam Mendjiadeu	Lola Pendande
PF	Morgan Maly	Chrysanthi Beneki
SF	Eleanna Christinaki	Yohana Issabella Ewodo	Christina Anastasopoulou	Zafeirenia Karalfti
SG	Kyra Lambert	Eri Mplithikotsi
PG	Evgenia Kollatou	Olympia Sakellariou	Eleni Togka	Ourania Leri

== Gallery ==
Evina Maltsi

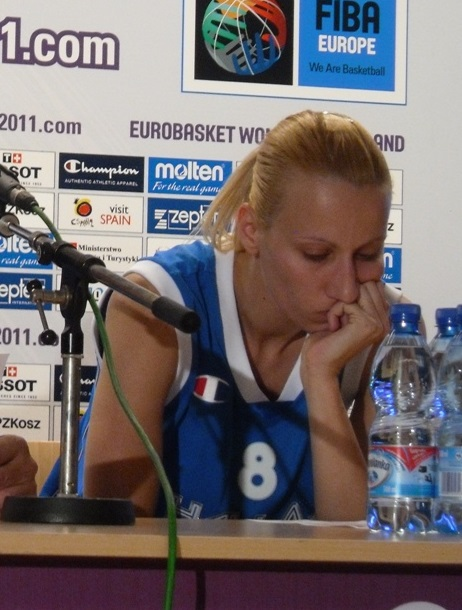
Styliani Kaltsidou

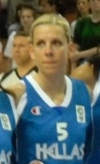
Evina Stamati

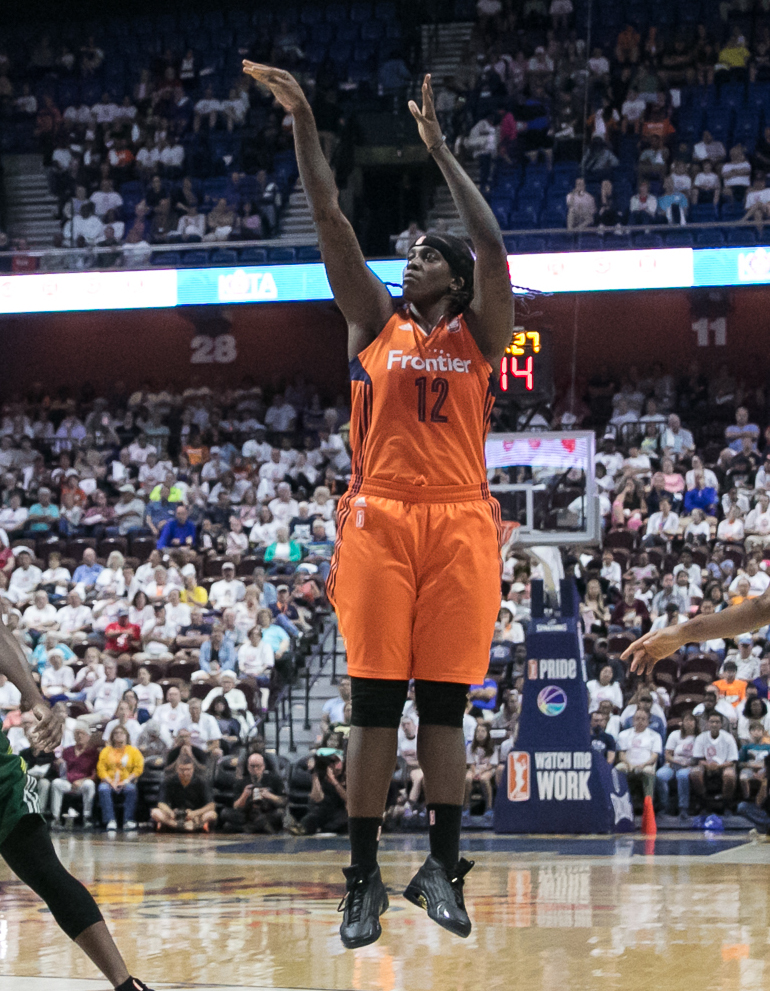
Lynetta Kizer

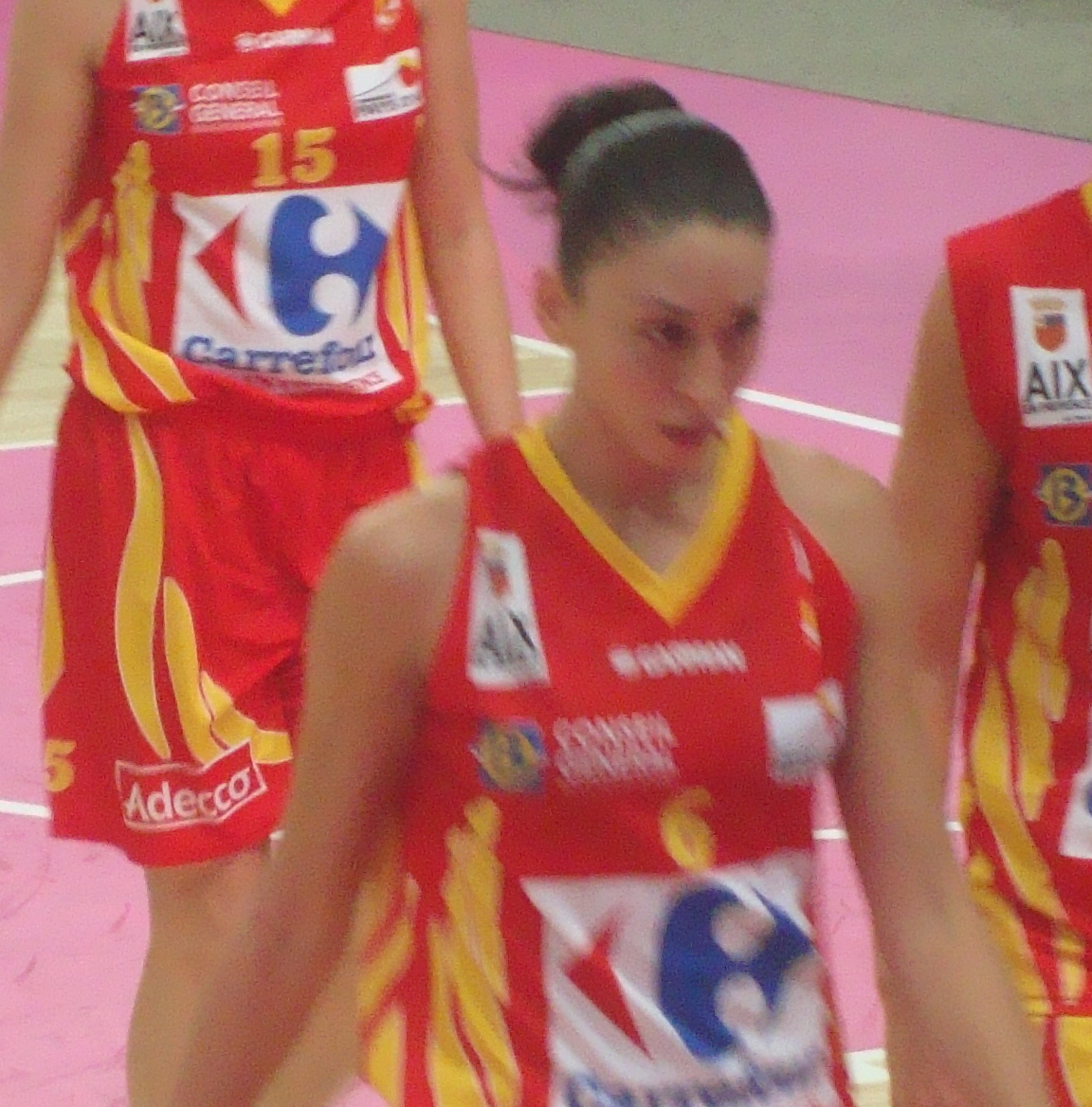
Zoi Dimitrakou

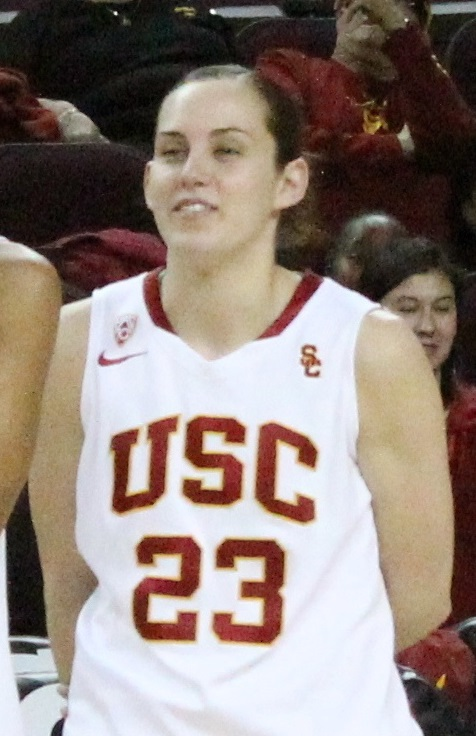
Jacki Gemelos

Pelagia Papamichail

== Honours ==
=== Domestic competitions ===
- Greek League
  - Winners (9): 2015–16, 2016–17, 2017–18, 2018–19, 2019–20, 2021–22, 2022–23, 2023–24, 2024–25
- Greek Cup
  - Winners (6) (record): 2015–16, 2016–17, 2017–18, 2018–19, 2021–22, 2024–25
- Double
  - Winners (6) (record): 2015–16, 2016–17, 2017–18, 2018–19, 2021–22, 2024–25
- Greek Super Cup
  - Winners (1) (record): 2025

=== Regional competitions ===
- Women's Division Center Championship
  - Winners (3): 1956, 1958, 1959

== Technical and managerial staff ==
Name	Job
(Greece) Evi Dimitratou	Team Manager
(Greece) Froso Drakaki	Head coach

== Seasons ==
Season	League	Cup	Europe	Coach	Roster
2015–16	Champion	Winner		Eleni Kapogianni	Evina Stamati, Anastasia Gkotzi, Roula Kalogirou, Anthi Balta, Soultana Chalivera, Maria Roza Boni, Afroditi Kosma, Pelagia Papamichail, Olga Chatzinikolaou, Nena Nikolaidou, Lykendra Johnson, Hallie Christofferson
2016–17	Champion	Winner	EuroCup; Group Stage	Eleni Kapogianni	Evina Stamati, Anastasia Gkotzi, Soultana Chalivera, Maria Roza Boni, Afroditi Kosma, Pelagia Papamichail, Olga Chatzinikolaou, Lykendra Johnson, Evina Maltsi, Styliani Kaltsidou, Zoi Dimitrakou, Stella Fouraki, Lynetta Kizer (Kateřina Bartoňová, Doneeka Lewis, Milica Jovanović left during the season)
2017–18	Champion	Winner	EuroCup; Round of 16	Eleni Kapogianni, Kostas Missas	Evina Stamati, Soultana Chalivera, Afroditi Kosma, Anthi Balta, Olga Chatzinikolaou, Evina Maltsi, Styliani Kaltsidou, Anna Spyridopoulou, Angeliki Nikolopoulou, Katerina Sotiriou, Yvonne Anderson, Mirna Mazić, Victoria Macaulay
2018–19	Champion	Winner	EuroLeague; Group Stage	Giorgos Pantelakis	Evina Stamati, Afroditi Kosma, Anna Spyridopoulou, Angeliki Nikolopoulou, Katerina Sotiriou, Lykendra Johnson, Anna Niki Stamolamprou, Pinelopi Pavlopoulou, Maria Avtzi, Christina Litsi, Mirna Mazić, Rita Rasheed, Ivana Tikvić, Jessica Thomas
2019–20	Champion	Cancelled (COVID-19 pandemic)	EuroCup; Round of 16	Giorgos Pantelakis	Evina Stamati, Afroditi Kosma, Anna Spyridopoulou, Angeliki Nikolopoulou, Anna Niki Stamolamprou, Pinelopi Pavlopoulou, Maria Avtzi, Jacki Gemelos, Vasiliki Louka, Jessica Thomas, Bashaara Graves, Anna Jurčenková (Katerina Sotiriou left during the season)
2020–21	Runners up	Cancelled (COVID-19 pandemic)	Cancelled (COVID-19 pandemic)	Giorgos Pantelakis	Evina Stamati, Anna Spyridopoulou, Angeliki Nikolopoulou, Anna Niki Stamolamprou, Dionysia Alexandri, Eirini Kouki, Vasiliki Papamarkaki, Athanasia Panteli, Maria-Eleni Grispou, Nathalie Fontaine, Stephanie Kostowicz, Jori Davis, Taya Reimer
2021–22	Champion	Winner	EuroCup; Round of 8	Martins Zibarts	Evina Stamati, Anna Spyridopoulou, Angeliki Nikolopoulou, Anna Niki Stamolamprou, Dionysia Alexandri, Vasiliki Papamarkaki, Athanasia Panteli, Stella Fouraki, Ioanna Diela, Eleni Syrra, Evangelia Vamvaka, Kristīne Vītola, Michelle Plouffe, Ruth Hamblin, Alexis Tolefree, Shayla Cooper
2022–23	Champion	Last 8	EuroLeague; Group Stage	Martins Zibarts, Thanos Niklas	Evina Stamati, Anna Spyridopoulou, Angeliki Nikolopoulou, Anna Niki Stamolamprou, Ioanna Diela, Eleni Syrra, Evangelia Vamvaka, Megan Gustafson, Kylee Shook, Aina Ayuso, Digna Strautmane
2023–24	Champion	Last 8	EuroCup; Round of 32	Thanos Niklas	Anna Spyridopoulou, Angeliki Nikolopoulou, Ioanna Diela, Eleni Syrra, Eleanna Christinaki, Evgenia Kollatou, Zafeirenia Karlafti, Maria Anastasopoulou, Georgia Kampisiouli, Anna Kyriakoudi, Kristīne Vītola, Rebecca Tobin, Brooque Williams (Ziomara Morrison left during the season)
2024–25	Champion	Winner	EuroLeague; Group Stage EuroCup; Play-off Round 1	Thanos Niklas	Anna Spyridopoulou, Zafeirenia Karlafti, Angeliki Nikolopoulou, Eleanna Christinaki, Evgenia Kollatou, Rebecca Tobin, Ivana Raca, Merritt Hempe, Kyra Lambert, Elena Pilakouta, Eleni Syrra, Evgenia Kollatou, Ioanna Diella, Anna Kyriakoudi, Georgia Kampissiouli, Olga Agrafioti

== Notable players ==
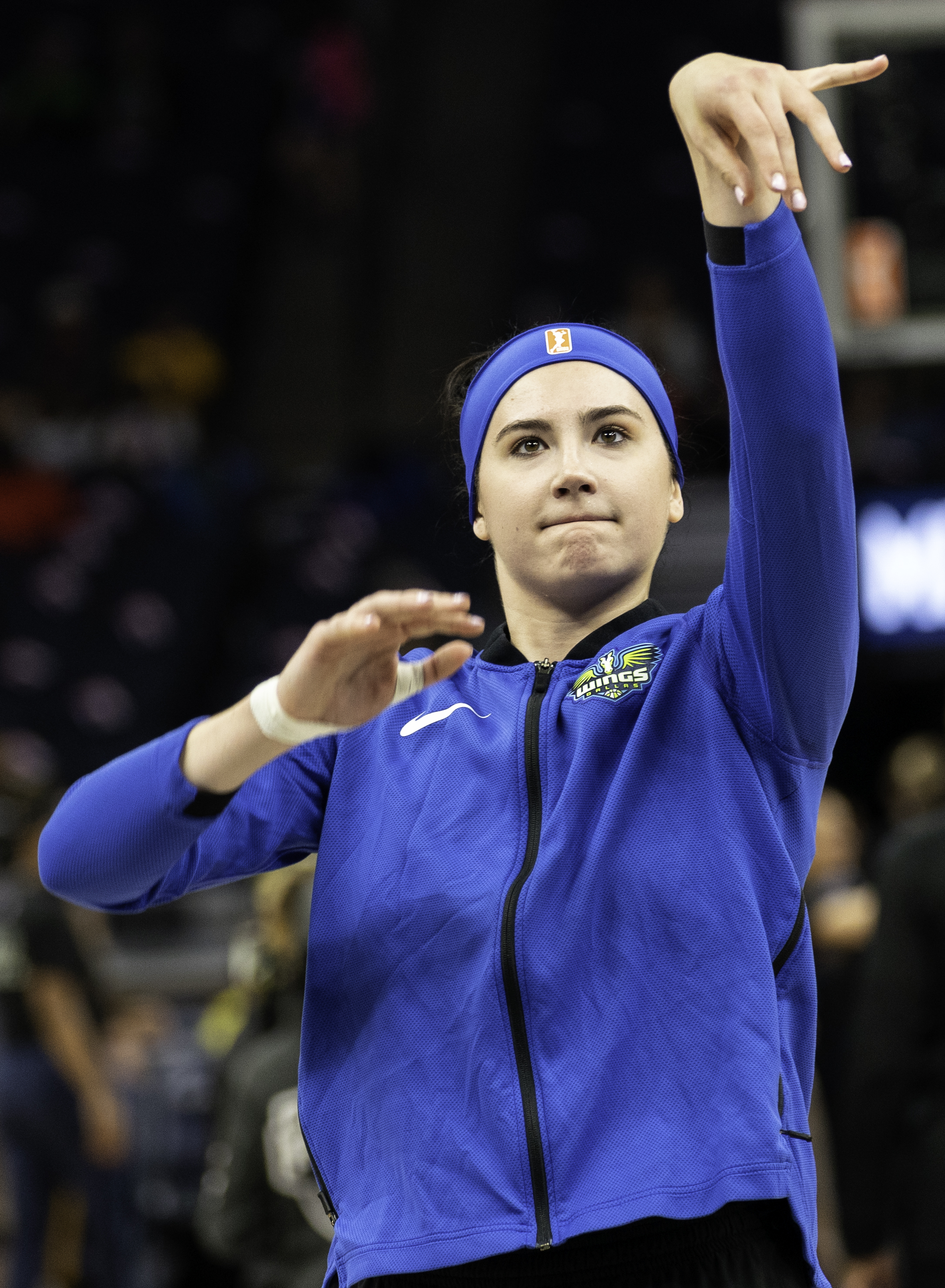
Megan Gustafson

- (Greece) Anthi Balta
- (Greece) Maria Roza Boni
- (Greece) Soultana Chalivera
- (Greece) Eleanna Christinaki
- (Greece) Zoi Dimitrakou
- (Greece) Ioanna Diela
- (Greece) Stella Fouraki
- (Greece) (United States) Jacki Gemelos
- (Greece) Anastasia Gkotzi
- (Greece) Styliani Kaltsidou
- (Greece) Afroditi Kosma
- (Greece) Evina Maltsi
- (Greece) Nena Nikolaidou
- (Greece) Angeliki Nikolopoulou
- (Greece) Pelagia Papamichail
- (Greece) Pinelopi Pavlopoulou
- (Greece) Aimilia Skrivanou
- (Greece) Loukia Skrivanou
- (Greece) Katerina Sotiriou
- (Greece) Anna Spyridopoulou
- (Greece) Evina Stamati
- (Greece) Anna Niki Stamolamprou
- (Greece) Eleni Syrra
- (Australia) Kylee Shook
- (Canada) Ruth Hamblin
- (Canada) Michelle Plouffe
- (Croatia) Mirna Mazić
- (Croatia) Ivana Tikvić
- (Latvia) Digna Strautmane
- (Latvia) Kristīne Vītola
- (Slovakia) Anna Jurčenková
- (Spain) Aina Ayuso
- (United States) Yvonne Anderson
- (United States) Hallie Christofferson
- (United States) Bashaara Graves
- (United States) Megan Gustafson
- (United States) Lykendra Johnson
- (United States) Lynetta Kizer
- (United States) Victoria Macaulay
- (United States) Jessica Thomas
- (United States) Rebecca Tobin

== Notable coaches ==
- Otto Simicek
- Ioannis Spanoudakis
- Eleni Kapogianni
- Kostas Missas
- Giorgos Pantelakis
- Martins Zibarts
- Thanos Niklas

== Kit manufacturers and Shirt sponsors ==
Period	Kit manufacturer	Shirt partner
2015–2016	Adidas	Novibet
2016–2017	Adidas	Stoiximan.gr

== See also ==
- Olympiacos Men's Basketball
