= Proteas Voulas B.C. =

Proteas Voulas
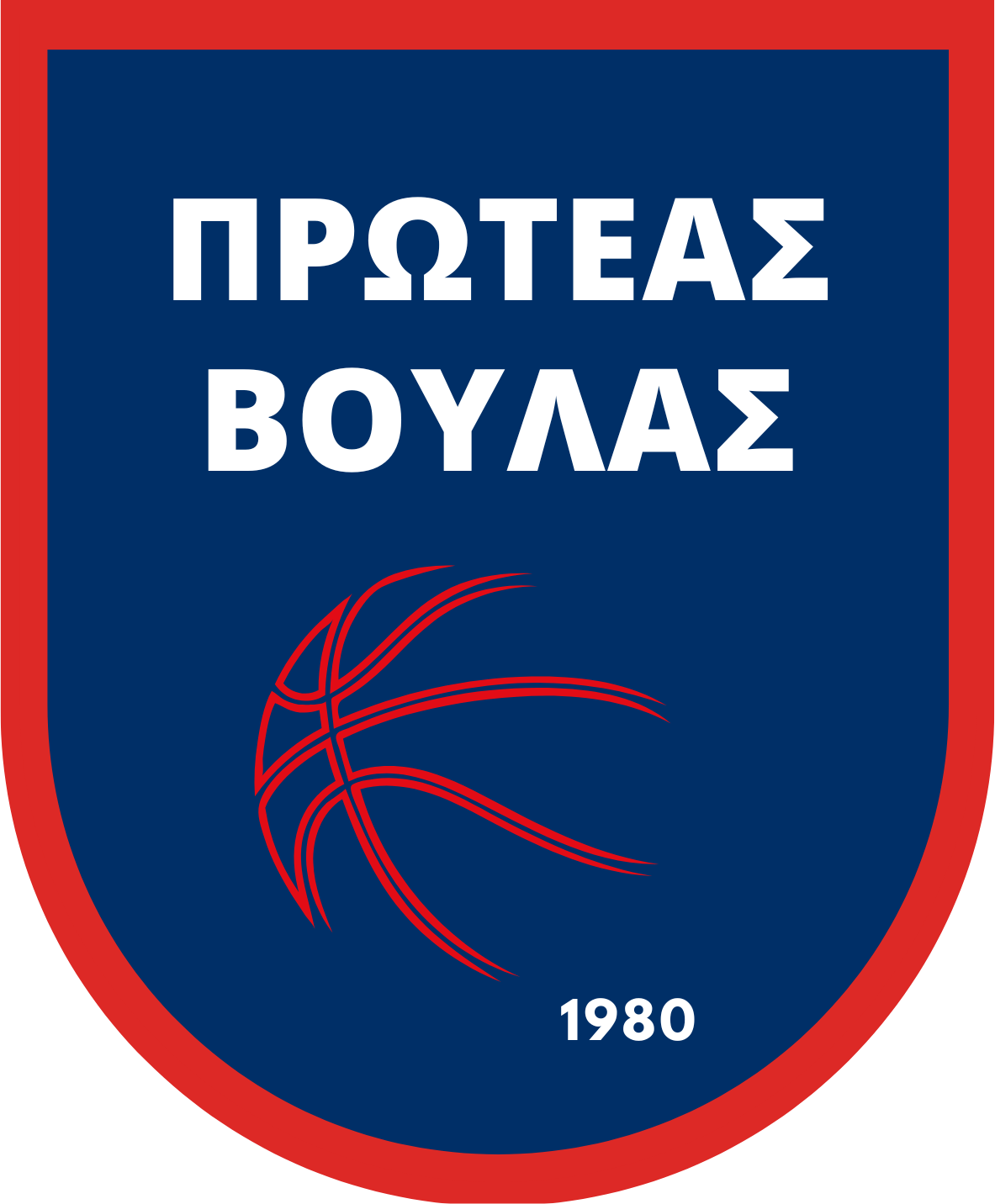
- Leagues: Greek Championship; Greek Cup
- Arena: Voulas Indoor Hall
- Location: Voula, Athens, Greece
- Team colors: Red and Blue
Home	Away

Proteas Voulas is a Greek basketball club that is based in Voula, Athens. It was founded in 1980. Proteas has both men's and women's basketball teams, which play in Greek national divisions. The women's team plays in the Greek Women's League (first-tier), and the men's team plays in Greek Elite League (second-tier). The team's colours are blue and red. The home arena of the club is the Voulas Indoor Hall.

== Women's team ==
Proteas Voulas Women's team won a Greek Cup title, in the 2012–13 season. That same season, the club played in the A2 National Women's League. Proteas thus became the first club in Greek women's basketball to win a Greek Cup title, while it was playing in a lower division than the top-tier level Greek Women's League. After that same season, Proteas was promoted up to the top-tier level league.

=== Roster ===
Proteas Voulas Women's team roster
Players
Coaches

Pos.	No.	Nat.	Name	Ht.	Wt.	Age
PG	4	(United States)	Rutan, Keity
PG	7	(Greece)	Spyridopoulou, Anna
SF	8	(Greece)	Spylioti, Daniel
SF	9	(Serbia)	Raca, Ivana
SF	10	(Greece)	Politopoulou, Lida
F	11	(Greece)	Nikolopoulou, Angeliki
C	12	(United States)	Radolph, Janiz
SF	13	(Greece)	Giakoumaki, Anthi
SF	14	(Greece)	Anastasopoulou, Mandy
SF	15	(Greece)	Dandoulaki, Maria
SF	16	(Greece)	Tsiglaki, Joe
SF	17	(Greece)	Mylonaki, Varvara
PG	18	(Greece)	Kostaki, Anastasia
PG	19	(Greece)	Kollatou, Evgenia

Head coach

- Vacant

Legend

- (C) Team captain
- Injured

- Roster
Updated: 2015-11-30

== Men's team ==
For the 2024–25 season, the men's team of Proteas Voulas plays in the Greek Elite League (second-tier). They were promoted up to the second division of Greek basketball for the first time in the team's history.

== Honours ==
Women's team

- Greek Cup
  - Winner (1): 2012–13
