= Greek Women's Basketball Cup =

- Sport: Basketball
- Founded: 1995–96 season
- Country: Greece
- Continent: (European Union) FIBA Europe (Europe)
- Most recent champions: Athinaikos (4 titles)
- Most titles: Olympiacos Piraeus (6 titles)
- Related competitions: Greek Women's League

The Greek Women's Basketball Cup is the national women's basketball cup competition of Greece. It began with the 1995–96 season, and it is organised by the Hellenic Basketball Federation (EOK). So far, eleven clubs have won the cup. Most of them are based in Athens. Olympiacos Piraeus is based in Piraeus and Apollon Kalamarias is based in Kalamaria, in Thessaloniki.

== History ==
Sporting won the first ever cup competition, and Olympiacos Piraeus have won five consecutive cup competitions. Olympiacos Piraeus have won the most cups (6), followed by Esperides Kallitheas having won four.

== Finals ==
Season	Winner	Result	Finalist	Place
1995–96	Sporting	98−56	Komotini	Ptolemaida
1996–97	Apollon Kalamarias	57−55	Olympiacos Volos	Katerini
1997–98	Thriamvos Athens	77−55	Sporting	Athens
1998–99	Sporting	48−44	Thriamvos Athens	Athens
1999–00	Panathinaikos	74−72	Apollon Ptolemaida	Serres
2000–01	DAS Ano Liosia	61−55	Sporting	Volos
2001–02	ANO Glyfada	72−68	Megas Alexandros Thessaloniki	Thessaloniki
2002–03	ANO Glyfada	66−56	Megas Alexandros Thessaloniki	Athens
2003–04	DAS Ano Liosia	64−59	Asteras Exarchia	Athens
2004–05	Sporting	61−60	DAS Ano Liosia	Athens
2005–06	Esperides Kallitheas	61−57	Sporting	Athens
2006–07	Esperides Kallitheas	58−53	MAS Kastoria	Volos
2007–08	Esperides Kallitheas	67−53	Apollon Ptolemaida	Veroia
2008–09	Esperides Kallitheas	70−58	Palaio Faliro	Athens
2009–10	Athinaikos	87−39	Nea Philadelfia/Nea Chalkidona	Veroia
2010–11	Athinaikos	64−61	Proteas Voulas	Athens
2011–12	Athinaikos	57−50	Esperides Kallitheas	Athens
2012–13	Proteas Voulas	52−50	PAOK	Volos
2013–14	Elliniko-Sourmena	57−55	Panathinaikos	Kos
2014–15	Elliniko-Sourmena	46−42	Anagennisi Neou Rysiou	Athens
2015–16	Olympiacos Piraeus	63−60	Panathinaikos	Lefkada
2016–17	Olympiacos Piraeus	103−68	Panionios	Athens
2017–18	Olympiacos Piraeus	68−53	PAOK	Athens
2018–19	Olympiacos Piraeus	78−69	Niki Lefkadas	Chania
2019–20	Cancelled due to the COVID-19 pandemic			
2020–21	Cancelled due to the COVID-19 pandemic			
2021–22	Olympiacos Piraeus	59−48	Eleftheria Moschatou	Chania
2022–23	Panathinaikos	66−61	Eleftheria Moschatou	Ano Liosia
2023–24	Panathinaikos	87−62	Esperides Kallitheas	Heraklion
2024–25	Olympiacos Piraeus	59−51	PAS Giannina	Heraklion
2025–26	Athinaikos	94−56	Proteas Voulas	Kavala

== Performance by club ==
Club	Cups	Seasons
Olympiacos	6	2016, 2017, 2018, 2019, 2022, 2025
Esperides Kallitheas	4	2006, 2007, 2008, 2009
Athinaikos	4	2010, 2011, 2012, 2026
Sporting	3	1996, 1999, 2005
Panathinaikos	3	2000, 2023, 2024
DAS Ano Liosia	2	2001, 2004
ANO Glyfada	2	2002, 2003
Elliniko-Sourmena	2	2014, 2015
Apollon Kalamarias	1	1997
Thriamvos Athens	1	1998
Proteas Voulas	1	2013
