= Esperides Kallitheas =

Greek basketball club

- Leagues: Greek Championship; Greek Cup
- Founded: 1995
- Arena: Esperos Gym Kallithea
- Capacity: 2,000
- Location: Kallithea, Athens, Greece
- Team colors
- Website: https://www.esperidesbasket.gr/

Esperides Kallitheas is a women's basketball club, based in Kallithea, Athens. Esperides was founded in 1995, and at the end of 2012, changed its name and its emblem, and restarted as GS Ikaros kallitheas. This was because since Esperides faced financial problems and wasn't able to continue in the Greek Women's League championship. Esperides has won two Greek Women's League championships and four Greek Women's Cups. In 2017-18 season Ikaros Kallitheas renamed again Esperides Kallitheas.

== History ==
Esperides was founded in 1995, after merging with the Esperos Women's club, Pantzitzifiakos, and Kallithea AE. In 2003, it absorbed the women's team of Glyfada B.C. During the 2000s, Esperides starred in Greek Women's League basketball. It won two Greek Women's League championships (2006, 2008), and was also the finalist six times (2004, 2005, 2007, 2009, 2010, 2012). Esperides also won four Greek Women's Cups. In 2012, the club was renamed to Ikaros Kallitheas, since it was in danger of dissolving because of financial problems. In the 2013-14 season, the new club, GS Ikaros Kallitheas, was relegated, and it now plays in the Greek Women's A2 national league (Greek women's second tier).

== Titles ==
- Greek Women's Basketball League
  - Winner (2): 2006, 2008
- Greek Women's Basketball Cup
  - Winner (4): 2006, 2007, 2008, 2009
