= Greece women's national basketball team =

Greece
- FIBA ranking: 28 ▼1 (14 September 2026)
- Joined FIBA: 1932
- FIBA zone: FIBA Europe
- Coach: Styliani Kaltsidou

Olympic Games
- Appearances: 1

World Cup
- Appearances: 2

EuroBasket
- Appearances: 11

Mediterranean Games
- Appearances: 6
- Medals: 1991
Home	Away

The Greece women's national basketball team is the representative for Greece in international women's basketball competitions and is organized and run by the Greek Basketball Federation.

== Participation in international competitions ==
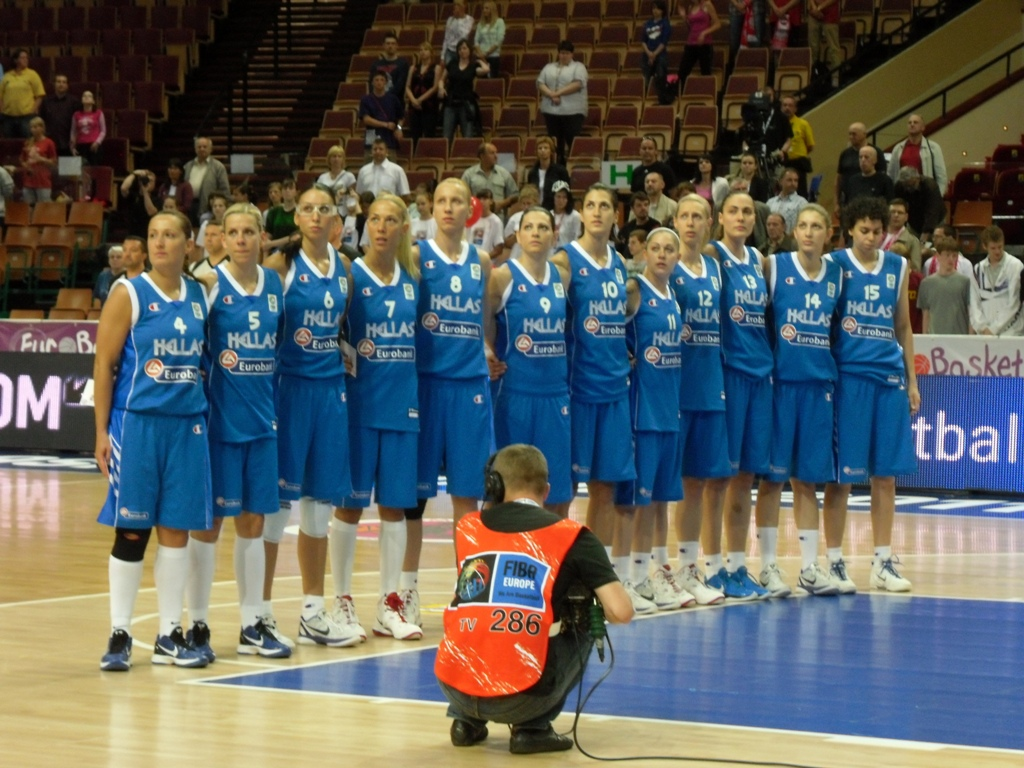
The Greek women's national basketball team participating in the FIBA EuroBasket Women 2011 contest.

=== Olympic Games ===
Year	Position	W	L
(Greece) 2004	7th	3	4
(China) 2008	Did not qualify		
(United Kingdom) 2012	Did not qualify		
(Brazil) 2016	Did not qualify		
(Japan) 2020	Did not qualify		
(France) 2024	Did not qualify		
(United States) 2028	To be determined		
Total	1/14	3	4

=== FIBA World Cup ===
Year	Position	W	L
(Czech Republic) 2010	11th	3	5
(Spain) 2018	11th	1	3
Total	2/19	4	8

=== EuroBasket Women ===
Year	Position	W	L
(France) 2001	10th	2	5
(Greece) 2003	9th	3	4
(Turkey) 2005	10th	2	5
(Italy) 2007	13th	0	3
(Latvia) 2009	5th	5	6
(Poland) 2011	13th	1	2
(Hungary) (Romania) 2015	10th	4	3
(Czech Republic) 2017	4th	3	4
(Latvia) / (Serbia) 2019	Did not qualify		
(France) (Spain) 2021	16th	0	3
(Slovenia) (Israel) 2023	11th	1	3
(Czech Republic) (Germany) (Greece) (Italy) 2025	11th	1	2
(Belgium) (Finland) (Lithuania) (Sweden) 2027	To be determined		
Total	11/44	22	40

=== Mediterranean Games ===
Year	Position	W	L
(Greece) 1991	Bronze medal	2	2
(France) 1993	6th	1	3
(Italy) 1997	4th	1	3
(Tunisia) 2001	6th	2	3
(Spain) 2005	4th	1	3
(Italy) 2009	4th	3	2
Total	6/7	10	16

== Current roster ==
Roster for the EuroBasket Women 2025.

Greece women's national basketball team roster
Players
Coaches

Pos.	No.	Name	Age – Date of birth	Height	Club	Ctr.
PG	3	Ioanna Krimili	23 – 16 July 2001	1.78 m (5 ft 10 in)	Panathinaikos	(Greece)
SF	5	Eleni Bosgana	21 – 4 December 2003	1.90 m (6 ft 3 in)	CB Leganés	(Spain)
PG	8	Pinelopi Pavlopoulou	29 – 3 March 1996	1.72 m (5 ft 8 in)	Athinaikos	(Greece)
PG	11	Angeliki Nikolopoulou	34 – 2 May 1991	1.78 m (5 ft 10 in)	Olympiacos	(Greece)
C	13	Vasiliki Louka	28 – 5 July 1996	1.93 m (6 ft 4 in)	Athinaikos	(Greece)
PF	15	Artemis Spanou (C)	32 – 1 January 1993	1.86 m (6 ft 1 in)	BK Brno	(Czech Republic)
F	18	Ioanna Chatzileonti	23 – 5 January 2002	1.84 m (6 ft 0 in)	Panathinaikos	(Greece)
SG	21	Eleanna Christinaki	28 – 16 December 1996	1.84 m (6 ft 0 in)	Olympiacos	(Greece)
F	24	Robyn Parks	32 – 19 July 1992	1.85 m (6 ft 1 in)	Connecticut Sun	(United States)
F	25	Antigoni Chairistanidou	34 – 3 October 1990	1.86 m (6 ft 1 in)	Athinaikos	(Greece)
C	34	Mariella Fasoula	27 – 2 September 1997	1.92 m (6 ft 4 in)	Beşiktaş	(Turkey)
SF	44	Zafeirenia Karlafti	27 – 8 June 1998	1.82 m (6 ft 0 in)	Olympiacos	(Greece)

Head coach

- (Greece) Petros Prekas

Assistant coach(es)

- (Greece) Dimitra Kalentzou

Legend

- (C) Team captain
- Club – describes last
  club before the tournament
- Age – describes age
  on 18 June 2025
