= Athinaikos women's basketball =

Athinaikos
- Nickname: Lords of Vyronas
- Leagues: Greek Championship; Greek Cup
- Arena: Ergani Indoor Hall
- Location: Vyronas, Greece
- Team colors: Purple and Yellow
- President: Nikos Ramantanis
- Head coach: Ilias Zouros
Home	Away

Former logo used until 2026

Athinaikos women's basketball, also known as Athinaikos Qualco for sponsorship reasons, is the women's professional basketball team of the Athens-based multi-sports club Athinaikos, that was founded in 1917. The team competes in the Greek Women's Basketball League.

== History ==
Athinaikos has starred in the women's Greek League championship during recent years, winning four consecutive championships, and three consecutive women's Greek Cups. From 2008 to 2012, Athinaikos dominated exclusively, breaking the record of consecutive wins in the Greek League (105 wins). The success of Athinaikos entered the Guinness book of records. The club's most important moment was the conquest of the EuroCup during the 2009-10 season, which was the first cup won by any Greek club in women's basketball, in European-wide competitions.

== Roster ==
Athinaikos women's basketball roster
Players
Coaches

Pos.	No.	Nat.	Name	Ht.	Age
F	1	(Serbia) (Cyprus)	Raca, Ivana	1.88 m (6 ft 2 in)	27 – 10 September 1999
PF	4	(Greece)	Charistianidou, Antigoni	1.88 m (6 ft 2 in)	35 – 3 October 1990
PG	5	(Greece)	Tsineke, Elena	1.83 m (6 ft 0 in)	27 – 11 July 1999
G/F	6	(Lithuania)	Nacickaitė, Kamilė	1.80 m (5 ft 11 in)	36 – 28 December 1989
PG	8	(Greece)	Pavlopoulou, Pinelopi	1.72 m (5 ft 8 in)	30 – 3 March 1996
C	9	(Slovakia)	Jakubcová, Ivana	1.98 m (6 ft 6 in)	32 – 20 August 1994
C	13	(Greece)	Louka, Vasiliki	1.93 m (6 ft 4 in)	30 – 5 July 1996
C	15	(Serbia) (France)	Tadić, Ana	1.98 m (6 ft 6 in)	28 – 21 September 1998
C	20	(United States) (Nigeria)	Macaulay, Victoria	1.93 m (6 ft 4 in)	36 – 23 August 1990
PF	23	(United States)	Prince, Alexis	1.88 m (6 ft 2 in)	32 – 5 February 1994
SF	24	(United States) (Greece)	Parks, Robyn	1.85 m (6 ft 1 in)	34 – 19 July 1992
C	34	(Greece)	Fasoula, Mariella	1.95 m (6 ft 5 in)	29 – 2 September 1997
PG	35	(Belgium)	Vanloo, Julie	1.72 m (5 ft 8 in)	33 – 10 February 1993
G	45	(Bulgaria)	Hristova, Borislava	1.83 m (6 ft 0 in)	30 – 12 July 1996
C	88	(Senegal)	Diop, Kaire	1.93 m (6 ft 4 in)	38 – 10 January 1988

Head coach

- (Greece) Ilias Zouros

Assistant coach(es)

- (Greece) Kostas Kalogeropoulos
- (Greece) Stratis Nianios

Legend

- (C) Team captain
- Injured

- Roster
Updated: 30 September 2026

== Notable players ==
- (Greece) Polymnia Saregkou
- (Greece) Dimitra Kalentzou
- (Greece) Olga Chatzinikolaou
- (United Kingdom) Chantelle Handy
- (Bulgaria) Vera Perostiyska

== Honours ==
- EuroCup
  - Winners (1): 2010
  - Runner's up (1): 2026
- Europe SuperCup
  - Runner's up (1): 2010
- Greek League
  - Winners (5): 2009, 2010, 2011, 2012, 2026
- Greek Cup
  - Winners (4): 2010, 2011, 2012, 2026
- Greek A2 Division
  - Winners (1): 2007
- ESKA Division Champion
  - Winner (1): 2006
