= Greek Women's Basketball League =

Professional women's basketball league in Greece

- Current season, competition or edition: 2024–25 Greek Women's Basketball League
- Sport: Basketball
- Founded: 1967
- No. of teams: 10
- Country: Greece
- Continent: (European Union) FIBA Europe (Europe)
- Most recent champions: Athinaikos women's basketball (5th title)
- Most titles: Sporting Athens (21 titles)
- Relegation to: A2 National Women's Basketball
- Domestic cup: Greek Women's Cup

The Greek women's Basketball League, also known as A1 Ethniki (A1 National) Women's Basketball is the most important competition of Greek women's professional basketball. It is organised by the EOK (Hellenic Basketball Federation). It began with the 1967–68 season. The first championship of the league, which was held in the 1967–68 season, was organised by ΕΟΑΠ (Greek: Ελληνική Ομοσπονδία Αθλοπαιδιών). Two years later, the EOK assumed control of the competition.

Iraklis Thessaloniki won the inaugural championship of the league, in the 1967–68 season. From 1976 to 1999, Sporting Athens dominated the competition, winning 20 championships in that period (they also won another championship in 2004). So far, Sporting has won the most league championships (21 in total). From 2008 to 2012, Athinaikos dominated exclusively, breaking the record of consecutive wins in the Greek Women's League. The successes of Olympiacos Piraeus were entered into the Guinness book of records. The consecutive win streak of Olympiacos was finally halted at 117 wins. The current champion of the league is Athinaikos women's basketball which has won five league championships.

== History ==
The Greek Women's Basketball League competition started in 1968. In the 1984–85 season, the competition was renamed to A National, and in the 1997–98 season, it was renamed to A1 National. Simultaneously, the second division was created under the name A2 National. In 2010, the organisers of the league championship decided to add playoff rounds to the competition.

== Current teams ==
Location of clubs for the 2023–24 Greek Women's Basketball League season.

The clubs for the 2023–24 season:

Club	Home city
A.S. Athinaikos	Vyronas, Athens
A.O. Eleutheria Moschatou	Moschato, Piraeus
Esperides Kallitheas	Kallithea, Athens
G.A.S. Evnicos	Ano Liosia, Athens
PAS Giannina	Ioannina
G.S. Iraklis Thessaloniki	Thessaloniki
Niki Lefkadas	Lefkada
Olympiacos S.F. Piraeus	Piraeus
Panathinaikos A.O.	Athens
PAOK	Thessaloniki
Proteas Voulas B.C.	Voula, Athens

== Titles holders ==
- 1967–68 Iraklis Thessaloniki
- 1968–69 Peiraikos
- 1969–70 Peiraikos
- 1970–71 Iraklis Thessaloniki
- 1971–72 Iraklis Thessaloniki
- 1972–73 Athens College
- 1973–74 Apollon Kalamarias
- 1974–75 Palaio Faliro
- 1975–76 Sporting Athens
- 1976–77 Sporting Athens
- 1977–78 Olympiacos Volos
- 1978–79 Sporting Athens
- 1979–80 Sporting Athens
- 1980–81 Sporting Athens
- 1981–82 Palaio Faliro
- 1982–83 Sporting Athens
- 1983–84 Sporting Athens
- 1984–85 Sporting Athens
- 1985–86 Sporting Athens
- 1986–87 Sporting Athens
- 1987–88 Sporting Athens
- 1988–89 Sporting Athens
- 1989–90 Sporting Athens
- 1990–91 Sporting Athens
- 1991–92 Apollon Kalamarias
- 1992–93 Sporting Athens
- 1993–94 Sporting Athens
- 1994–95 Sporting Athens
- 1995–96 Sporting Athens
- 1996–97 Sporting Athens
- 1997–98 Panathinaikos
- 1998–99 Sporting Athens
- 1999–00 Panathinaikos
- 2000–01 Ano Liosia
- 2001–02 Ano Liosia
- 2002–03 Ano Liosia
- 2003–04 Sporting Athens
- 2004–05 Panathinaikos
- 2005–06 Esperides Kallitheas
- 2006–07 Panionios
- 2007–08 Esperides Kallitheas
- 2008–09 Athinaikos
- 2009–10 Athinaikos
- 2010–11 Athinaikos
- 2011–12 Athinaikos
- 2012–13 Panathinaikos
- 2013–14 Elliniko-Sourmena
- 2014–15 Elliniko-Sourmena
- 2015–16 Olympiacos Piraeus
- 2016–17 Olympiacos Piraeus
- 2017–18 Olympiacos Piraeus
- 2018–19 Olympiacos Piraeus
- 2019–20 Olympiacos Piraeus
- 2020–21 Panathinaikos
- 2021–22 Olympiacos Piraeus
- 2022–23 Olympiacos Piraeus
- 2023–24 Olympiacos Piraeus
- 2024–25 Olympiacos Piraeus
- 2025-26 Athinaikos

== Performance by club ==
Club	Titles	Seasons
Sporting Athens	21	1976, 1977, 1979, 1980, 1981, 1983, 1984, 1985, 1986, 1987, 1988, 1989, 1990, 1991, 1993, 1994, 1995, 1996, 1997, 1999, 2004
Olympiacos Piraeus	9	2016, 2017, 2018, 2019, 2020, 2022, 2023, 2024, 2025
Panathinaikos	5	1998, 2000, 2005, 2013, 2021
Athinaikos	5	2009, 2010, 2011, 2012, 2026
Ano Liosia	3	2001, 2002, 2003
Iraklis Thessaloniki	3	1968, 1971, 1972
Peiraikos	2	1969, 1970
Apollon Kalamarias	2	1974, 1992
Palaio Faliro	2	1975, 1982
Esperides Kallitheas	2	2006, 2008
Elliniko-Sourmena	2	2014, 2015
Athens College	1	1973
Olympiacos Volos	1	1978
Panionios	1	2007

== Sponsors supporters ==
- Spalding
- Aegean
