= EuroBasket Women 2015 Group E =

Group E of the EuroBasket Women 2015 took place between 17 and 21 June 2015. The group played all of its games at Főnix Hall in Debrecen, Hungary.

The four best ranked teams advanced to the final round. The points against teams from the same preliminary round were taken over.

== Qualified teams ==
Group	Winners	Runners-up	Third place
A	France	Montenegro	Czech Republic
B	Belarus	Turkey	Greece

== Standings ==
Pos	Team	Pld	W	L	PF	PA	PD	Pts	Qualification
1	Turkey	5	4	1	299	262	+37	9 (Note: France–Turkey 56–66)	Advance to final round
2	France	5	4	1	335	308	+27	9	Advance to final round
3	Belarus	5	2	3	349	323	+26	7 (Note: Belarus 3pts/154:134 (+20) :: Belarus–Greece 82–57. Montenegro–Belarus 77–72)	Advance to final round
4	Montenegro	5	2	3	319	340	−21	7 (Note: Montenegro 3pts/140:148 (−8) :: Montenegro–Belarus 77–72, Montenegro–Greece 63–76)	Advance to final round
5	Greece	5	2	3	299	328	−29	7 (Note: Greece 3pts/133:145 (−12) :: Belarus–Greece 82–57. Montenegro–Greece 63–76)	
6	Czech Republic	5	1	4	319	359	−40	6	

Source: eurobasketwomen2015.com
Notes:

All times are local (UTC+2).

== 17 June ==
=== Turkey vs Montenegro ===
17 June 2015
15:30

Boxscore

Turkey	61–41	Montenegro
Scoring by quarter: 20–8, 8–13, 22–7, 11–13
Pts: Yılmaz 18; Rebs: Alben 7 Asts: Alben 7		Pts: Aleksić 7 Rebs: Perovanović 6 Asts: Škerović 4

Főnix Hall, Debrecen
Attendance: 100
Referees: Anne Panther (GER), Erez Gurion (ISR), Semen Ovinov (RUS)

=== Czech Republic vs Belarus ===
17 June 2015
18:00

Boxscore

Czech Republic	73–70	Belarus
Scoring by quarter: 18–17, 13–16, 17–19, 25–18
Pts: Elhotová 25; Rebs: Veselá 8 Asts: Bortelová 5		Pts: Harding 25; Rebs: Leuchanka 12; Asts: three players 2

Főnix Hall, Debrecen
Attendance: 100
Referees: Jasmina Juras (SRB), Maj Forsberg (DEN), Gellért Kapitány (HUN)

=== Greece vs France ===
17 June 2015
20:30

Boxscore

Greece	42–51	France
Scoring by quarter: 6–15, 10–10, 16–11, 10–15
Pts: Dimitrákou 16; Rebs: Spanou 8 Asts: three players 2		Pts: Gruda, Salagnac 12; Rebs: Gruda, Skrela 6 Asts: Dumerc 5

Főnix Hall, Debrecen
Attendance: 100
Referees: Andris Aunkrogers (LAT), Artūras Šukys (LTU), Jelena Tomić (CRO)

== 19 June ==
=== Montenegro vs Belarus ===
19 June 2015
15:30

Boxscore

Montenegro	77–72	Belarus
Scoring by quarter: 21–14, 12–17, 23–18, 21–23
Pts: Jovanović 20; Rebs: Robinson 17; Asts: Škerović 7		Pts: Snytsina 21; Rebs: Leuchanka 13; Asts: Harding 9

Főnix Hall, Debrecen
Attendance: 200
Referees: Andris Aunkrogers (LAT), Carlos Peruga (ESP), Artūras Šukys (LTU)

=== Greece vs Czech Republic ===
19 June 2015
18:00

Boxscore

Greece	74–71	Czech Republic
Scoring by quarter: 24–22, 19–26, 13–10, 18–13
Pts: Kaltsidou 20; Rebs: Spanou 9 Asts: Lymoura 3		Pts: Hanušová 16; Rebs: Burgrová 9 Asts: Bortelová 6

Főnix Hall, Debrecen
Attendance: 150
Referees: Jasmina Juras (SRB), Erez Gurion (ISR), Semen Ovinov (RUS)

=== France vs Turkey ===
19 June 2015
20:30

Boxscore

France	56–66	Turkey
Scoring by quarter: 16–15, 17–15, 11–14, 12–22
Pts: Gruda 16; Rebs: Gruda 13; Asts: Dumerc 4		Pts: Sanders 23; Rebs: Yılmaz 7 Asts: Alben, Vardarlı 4

Főnix Hall, Debrecen
Attendance: 400
Referees: Anne Panther (GER), Maj Forsberg (DEN), Gellért Kapitány (HUN)

== 21 June ==
=== Turkey vs Czech Republic ===
21 June 2015
15:30

Boxscore

Turkey	59–48	Czech Republic
Scoring by quarter: 11–10, 15–15, 18–5, 15–18
Pts: Yılmaz 23; Rebs: Yılmaz 8 Asts: Alben 11		Pts: Stejskalová 12; Rebs: Burgrová 10; Asts: Elhotová 3

Főnix Hall, Debrecen
Attendance: 450
Referees: Andris Aunkrogers (LAT), Semen Ovinov (RUS), Artūras Šukys (LTU)

=== Montenegro vs Greece ===
21 June 2015
18:00

Boxscore

Montenegro	63–76	Greece
Scoring by quarter: 11–22, 16–22, 24–14, 12–18
Pts: Perovanović 15; Rebs: Perovanović, Robinson 10; Asts: Škerović 9		Pts: Dimitrákou 29; Rebs: Spanou 8 Asts: Chatzinikolaou 5

Főnix Hall, Debrecen
Attendance: 320
Referees: Maj Forsberg (DEN), Carlos Peruga (ESP), Jelena Tomić (CRO)

=== Belarus vs France ===
21 June 2015
20:30

Boxscore

Belarus	58–64	France
Scoring by quarter: 10–20, 19–20, 14–12, 15–12
Pts: Leuchanka 16; Rebs: Leuchanka 9 Asts: Harding 8		Pts: Yacoubou 14; Rebs: Yacoubou 12; Asts: Dumerc 4

Főnix Hall, Debrecen
Attendance: 300
Referees: Anne Panther (GER), Jasmina Juras (SRB), Erez Gurion (ISR)
