= EuroBasket Women 2015 final round =

The final round of the EuroBasket Women 2015 took place between 24 and 28 June 2015 with all games played at Syma Sport and Events Centre in Budapest, Hungary.

The four best ranked teams from each group of second round advanced.

== Qualified teams ==
Group	Winners	Runners-up	Third place	Fourth place
E	Turkey	France	Belarus	Montenegro
F	Spain	Lithuania	Russia	Serbia

All times are local (UTC+2).

== Bracket ==
Quarterfinals
24 June
Turkey	63
Serbia	75
24 June
Lithuania	66
Belarus	68
25 June
France	77
Russia	74
25 June
Spain	75
Montenegro	74

Semifinals
26 June
Serbia	74
Belarus	72
26 June
France	63
Spain	58

Final
28 June
Serbia	76
France	68
Third place
28 June
Belarus	58
Spain	74

5–8th place bracket

5–8th place semifinals
25 June
Turkey	66
Lithuania	57
26 June
Russia	73
Montenegro	65

Fifth place
27 June
Turkey	68
Russia	66
Seventh place
27 June
Lithuania	77
Montenegro	89

== Quarterfinals ==
24 June 2015
18:00

Boxscore

Turkey	63–75	Serbia
Scoring by quarter: 18–18, 9–10, 11–26, 25–21
Pts: Sanders 25; Rebs: Sanders 10; Asts: Alben 6		Pts: A. Dabović 31; Rebs: Petrović 7 Asts: Milovanović 3

Syma Sport and Events Centre, Budapest
Attendance: 400
Referees: Andris Aunkrogers (LAT), Maj Forsberg (DEN), Erez Gurion (ISR)

24 June 2015
20:30

Boxscore

Lithuania	66–68	Belarus
Scoring by quarter: 10–16, 9–17, 24–18, 23–17
Pts: Nacickaitė 21; Rebs: Kuktienė, Linkevičienė 8 Asts: Linkevičienė 4		Pts: Verameyenka 15; Rebs: Verameyenka 9 Asts: Harding 6

Syma Sport and Events Centre, Budapest
Attendance: 800
Referees: Joseph Bissang (FRA), Carlos Peruga (ESP), Janusz Calik (POL)

25 June 2015
18:00

Boxscore

Spain	75–74	Montenegro
Scoring by quarter: 16–17, 23–20, 16–15, 20–22
Pts: Torrens 28; Rebs: Nicholls 16; Asts: Domínguez 3		Pts: Robinson 23; Rebs: Robinson 7 Asts: Škerović 6

Syma Sport and Events Centre, Budapest
Attendance: 1,000
Referees: Anne Panther (GER), Manuel Mazzoni (ITA), Gellért Kapitány (HUN)

25 June 2015
20:30

Boxscore

France	77–74	Russia
Scoring by quarter: 16–20, 22–15, 19–18, 20–21
Pts: Gruda 23; Rebs: Tchatchouang, Yacoubou 7 Asts: Dumerc 9		Pts: Prince 31; Rebs: Osipova 7 Asts: Belyakova, Prince 5

Syma Sport and Events Centre, Budapest
Attendance: 1,200
Referees: Jasmina Juras (SRB), Karen Lasuik (CAN), Fabiana Martinescu (ROU)

== 5–8th place semifinals ==
25 June 2015
15:30

Boxscore

Turkey	66–57	Lithuania
Scoring by quarter: 16–16, 14–16, 13–10, 23–15
Pts: Alben 16; Rebs: Sanders 12; Asts: Alben 10		Pts: Petronytė 18; Rebs: Petronytė 8 Asts: Gutkauskaitė 4

Syma Sport and Events Centre, Budapest
Attendance: 300
Referees: Joseph Bissang (FRA), Semen Ovinov (RUS), Ilona Kučerová (CZE)

26 June 2015
15:30

Boxscore

Russia	73–65	Montenegro
Scoring by quarter: 26–12, 17–18, 10–17, 20–18
Pts: Vadeeva 16; Rebs: Osipova 7 Asts: Prince 6		Pts: Robinson 27; Rebs: Robinson 9 Asts: Škerović 7

Syma Sport and Events Centre, Budapest
Attendance: 400
Referees: Carlos Peruga (ESP), Erez Gurion (ISR), Janusz Calik (POL)

== Semifinals ==
26 June 2015
18:00

Boxscore

Serbia	74–72	Belarus
Scoring by quarter: 18–18, 18–20, 23–19, 15–15
Pts: A. Dabović 21; Rebs: Petrović 9 Asts: A. Dabović 3		Pts: Leuchanka 22; Rebs: Leuchanka 11; Asts: Harding 6

Syma Sport and Events Centre, Budapest
Attendance: 850
Referees: Fabiana Martinescu (ROU), Maj Forsberg (DEN), Manuel Mazzoni (ITA)

26 June 2015
20:30

Boxscore

France	63–58	Spain
Scoring by quarter: 15–13, 14–18, 22–15, 12–12
Pts: Gruda 16; Rebs: Gruda 12; Asts: four players 3		Pts: Torrens 13; Rebs: Nicholls 5 Asts: Palau 7

Syma Sport and Events Centre, Budapest
Attendance: 1,000
Referees: Karen Lasuik (CAN), Anne Panther (GER), Andris Aunkrogers (LAT)

== Seventh place game ==
27 June 2015
16:00

Boxscore

Lithuania	77–89	Montenegro
Scoring by quarter: 24–26, 12–27, 20–17, 21–19
Pts: Nacickaitė 28; Rebs: Grigalauskytė 10; Asts: Grigalauskytė, Gutkauskaitė 4		Pts: Robinson 24; Rebs: Robinson 11; Asts: Perovanović 6

Syma Sport and Events Centre, Budapest
Attendance: 1,100
Referees: Ilona Kučerová (CZE), Semen Ovinov (RUS), Andrei Sharapa (BLR)

== Fifth place game ==
27 June 2015
20:00

Boxscore

Turkey	68–66 (OT)	Russia
Scoring by quarter: 15–17, 12–15, 18–15, 14–12, Overtime: 9–7
Pts: Sanders 28; Rebs: Sanders 13; Asts: Vardarlı 5		Pts: Vadeeva 19; Rebs: Vadeeva 10; Asts: Prince 8

Syma Sport and Events Centre, Budapest
Attendance: 800
Referees: Carlos Peruga (ESP), Janusz Calik (POL), Ognjen Jokić (MNE)

== Third place game ==
28 June 2015
16:30

Boxscore

Belarus	58–74	Spain
Scoring by quarter: 18–12, 12–22, 14–21, 14–19
Pts: Leuchanka, Ziuzkova 13; Rebs: Leuchanka 14; Asts: Harding 6		Pts: Torrens 25; Rebs: Ndour, Nicholls 7 Asts: Torrens 5

Syma Sport and Events Centre, Budapest
Attendance: 3,000
Referees: Jasmina Juras (SRB), Joseph Bissang (FRA), Fabiana Martinescu (ROU)

== Final ==
28 June 2015
19:00

Boxscore

Serbia	76–68	France
Scoring by quarter: 15–22, 18–10, 20–17, 23–19
Pts: A. Dabović 25; Rebs: Page 8 Asts: A. Dabović 3		Pts: Gruda 16; Rebs: Yacoubou 6 Asts: Dumerc 5

Syma Sport and Events Centre, Budapest
Attendance: 5,200
Referees: Karen Lasuik (CAN), Anne Panther (GER), Maj Forsberg (DEN)
