= EuroBasket Women 2015 =

2015 edition of the EuroBasket Women

EuroBasket 2015 Women
35th FIBA European Women's Basketball Championship

Tournament details
- Host countries: Hungary; Romania
- Dates: 11–28 June
- Teams: 20 (from 31 federations)
- Venue: 7 (in 7 host cities)

Final positions
- Champions: Serbia (1st title)
- Runners-up: France
- Third place: Spain
- Fourth place: Belarus

Tournament statistics
- MVP: (Serbia) Ana Dabović
- Top scorer: (Spain) Torrens (19.7)
- Top rebounds: (Belarus) Leuchanka (11.5)
- Top assists: (Montenegro) Škerović (7.1)
- PPG (Team): Slovakia (75.9)
- RPG (Team): Russia (40.1)
- APG (Team): France (19.8)

The 2015 European Women Basketball Championship, commonly called EuroBasket Women 2015, was the 35th edition of the continental tournament in women's basketball, sanctioned by the FIBA Europe. The tournament was co-held in Hungary, which hosted the championship for the fifth time after 1950, 1964, 1983 and 1997, and Romania which hosted it for the second time after 1966, on 11–28 June 2015. The event was hosted by more than one country for the first time.

Serbia won their first title by defeating France 76–68 in the final.

== Host selection ==
Initially six member federations expressed their intention to organize the tournament: Belarus and Lithuania, who applied a joint bid; Hungary, Israel, Serbia and Spain. Lithuania later refused the plan of a joint bid and eventually two countries submitted an official candidation, Belarus and Hungary.

The final decision was made by the FIBA Europe Board on 18 December 2011 in their meeting in Munich, which awarded the organization rights to Hungary by majority vote. FIBA Europe president Ólafur Rafnsson was on the opinion that "it was an excellent choice as Hungary has tradition in basketball and especially in women's basketball." Attila Czene, State Minister for Sport of the Ministry of National Resources was also pleased, stating that the European Championship great opportunity to upgrade and expand the infrastructure, as Hungary's aim "is to invest in sport and basketball is a main team sport." "As a former Olympic champion, I am happy that we can reintroduce team sport in Hungary. Basketball is a bit behind handball right now and we are trying to close this gap, with 2015 we can start making progress" – he added.

Romanian Basketball Federation has announced that FIBA Europe board has granted them the rights to co-host EuroBasket Women in 2015 with Hungary. Originally Hungary applied to host and was awarded the tournament as the only host country. According to the announcement current plan has Romania hosting groups in Cluj-Napoca, Oradea and Timișoara.

== Venues ==
Location	View	City	Arena	Capacity	Round
EuroBasket Women 2015 is located in Hungary		Budapest	Syma Sport and Events Centre	5,500	Final round
EuroBasket Women 2015 is located in Hungary		Debrecen	Főnix Hall	5,500	Second round
EuroBasket Women 2015 is located in Hungary		Győr	Audi Aréna	5,000	Second round
EuroBasket Women 2015 is located in Hungary		Szombathely	Arena Savaria	4,000	First round
EuroBasket Women 2015 is located in Hungary		Sopron	MKB Aréna Sopron	2,500	First round
EuroBasket Women 2015 is located in Romania		Oradea	Arena Antonio Alexe	2,500	First round
EuroBasket Women 2015 is located in Romania		Timișoara	Sala Polivalentă "Politehnica"	3,000	First round

== Qualification ==
The qualification was held from 7 June 2013 to 25 June 2014.

=== Qualified teams ===
Country	Qualified as	Date of qualification	Last appearance	Best placement in tournament	WR
Hungary	Host nation	18 December 2011	2009	Runner-up (1950, 1956)	55
Romania	Host nation	19 May 2012	2007	4th place (1962, 1964, 1966)	55
Turkey	Host nation of the 2014 FIBA World Championship for Women & 3rd place of EuroBasket Women 2013	13 March 2011	2013	Runner-up (2011)	13
Greece	Winner of 1st Qualification round	25 June 2013	2011	5th place (2009)	22
Serbia	4th place of EuroBasket Women 2013	26 June 2013	2013	4th place (2013)	29
Spain	Winner of EuroBasket Women 2013	26 June 2013	2013	Champion (1993, 2013)	6
Czech Republic	6th place of EuroBasket Women 2013	27 June 2013	2013	Champion (2005)	5
France	Runner-up of EuroBasket Women 2013	27 June 2013	2013	Champion (2001, 2009)	4
Belarus	5th place of EuroBasket Women 2013	28 June 2013	2013	3rd place (2007)	10
Croatia	Winner of Qualification group F	22 June 2014	2013	5th place (2011)	19
Sweden	Runner-up of Qualification group E	22 June 2014	2013	7th place (1987, 2013)	43
Latvia	Winner of Qualification group C	22 June 2014	2013	4th place (2007)	16
Poland	Runner-up of Qualification group A	22 June 2014	2011	Champion (1999)	39
Ukraine	Runner-up of Qualification group D	23 June 2014	2013	Champion (1995)	43
Russia	Winner of Qualification group E	25 June 2014	2013	Champion (2003, 2007, 2011)	3
Slovakia	Winner of Qualification group A	25 June 2014	2013	Runner-up (1997)	33
Italy	Runner-up of Qualification group C	25 June 2014	2013	Champion (1938)	28
Lithuania	Winner of Qualification group B	25 June 2014	2013	Champion (1997)	15
Great Britain	Runner-up of Qualification group B	25 June 2014	2013	9th place (2013)	24
Montenegro	Winner of Qualification group D	25 June 2014	2013	6th place (2011)	34

== Draw ==
The draw was held on 29 November 2014 in Budapest, Hungary.

=== Seedings ===
The seeding was announced on 20 November 2014. According to the FIBA Europe regulations the participating nations are seeded based on their record in EuroBasket Women 2013 final tournament (shown in brackets for first 6 teams) or EuroBasket Women 2015 qualification (shown in brackets with symbol Q).

Pot 1	Pot 2	Pot 3	Pot 4	Pot 5
Spain (1); France (2); Turkey (3); Serbia (4)	Belarus (5); Czech Republic (6); Croatia (Q1); Slovakia (Q2)	Lithuania (Q3); Ukraine (Q4); Poland (Q5); Latvia (Q6)	Montenegro (Q7); Russia (Q8); Sweden (Q9); Italy (Q10)	Great Britain (Q11); Greece (Q1st); Hungary (host); Romania (host)

== First round ==
=== Group A ===
Pos	Team	Pld	W	L	PF	PA	PD	Pts	Qualification
1	France	4	4	0	319	264	+55	8	Advance to second round
2	Montenegro	4	3	1	301	263	+38	7	Advance to second round
3	Czech Republic	4	2	2	289	306	−17	6	Advance to second round
4	Ukraine	4	1	3	283	314	−31	5	
5	Romania	4	0	4	270	315	−45	4	

Source: eurobasketwomen2015.com

11 June 2015
Montenegro	71–52	Czech Republic
Ukraine	55–79	France
12 June 2015
Czech Republic	80–79	Ukraine
Romania	61–79	Montenegro
13 June 2015
France	85–75	Czech Republic
Ukraine	78–71	Romania
14 June 2015
Montenegro	84–71	Ukraine
Romania	67–76	France
15 June 2015
France	79–67	Montenegro
Czech Republic	82–71	Romania

=== Group B ===
Pos	Team	Pld	W	L	PF	PA	PD	Pts	Qualification
1	Belarus	4	4	0	299	234	+65	8	Advance to second round
2	Turkey	4	3	1	220	215	+5	7	Advance to second round
3	Greece	4	2	2	217	239	−22	6	Advance to second round
4	Italy	4	1	3	232	241	−9	5	
5	Poland	4	0	4	208	247	−39	4	

Source: eurobasketwomen2015.com

11 June 2015
Poland	54–57		Turkey
Italy	76–85	(OT)	Belarus
12 June 2015
Greece	51–46		Italy
Belarus	65–49		Poland
13 June 2015
Poland	50–59		Greece
Turkey	52–67		Belarus
14 June 2015
Italy	66–55		Poland
Greece	50–61		Turkey
15 June 2015
Belarus	82–57		Greece
Turkey	50–44		Italy

=== Group C ===
Pos	Team	Pld	W	L	PF	PA	PD	Pts	Qualification
1	Russia	4	3	1	293	223	+70	7 (Note: Russia–Serbia 77–53)	Advance to second round
2	Serbia	4	3	1	294	263	+31	7	Advance to second round
3	Croatia	4	2	2	277	305	−28	6 (Note: Croatia–Latvia 67–63)	Advance to second round
4	Latvia	4	2	2	258	263	−5	6	
5	Great Britain	4	0	4	222	290	−68	4	

Source: eurobasketwomen2015.com
Notes:

11 June 2015
Latvia	60–76	Serbia
Russia	83–62	Croatia
12 June 2015
Croatia	67–63	Latvia
Great Britain	40–71	Russia
13 June 2015
Latvia	67–58	Great Britain
Serbia	89–72	Croatia
14 June 2015
Great Britain	54–76	Serbia
Russia	62–68	Latvia
15 June 2015
Croatia	76–70	Great Britain
Serbia	53–77	Russia

=== Group D ===
Pos	Team	Pld	W	L	PF	PA	PD	Pts	Qualification
1	Spain	4	4	0	287	245	+42	8	Advance to second round
2	Slovakia	4	2	2	312	316	−4	6 (Note: Slovakia–Lithuania 85–79)	Advance to second round
3	Lithuania	4	2	2	279	291	−12	6	Advance to second round
4	Sweden	4	1	3	269	269	0	5 (Note: Sweden–Hungary 73–62)	
5	Hungary	4	1	3	261	287	−26	5	

Source: eurobasketwomen2015.com
Notes:

11 June 2015
Sweden	69–72	Slovakia
Lithuania	58–72	Spain
12 June 2015
Slovakia	85–79	Lithuania
Hungary	63–72	Sweden
13 June 2015
Spain	82–81	Slovakia
Lithuania	72–66	Hungary
14 June 2015
Sweden	68–70	Lithuania
Hungary	46–69	Spain
15 June 2015
Spain	64–60	Sweden
Slovakia	74–86	Hungary

== Second round ==
=== Group E ===
Pos	Team	Pld	W	L	PF	PA	PD	Pts	Qualification
1	Turkey	5	4	1	299	262	+37	9 (Note: France–Turkey 56–66)	Advance to final round
2	France	5	4	1	335	308	+27	9	Advance to final round
3	Belarus	5	2	3	349	323	+26	7 (Note: Belarus 3pts/154:134 (+20) :: Belarus–Greece 82–57. Montenegro–Belarus 77–72)	Advance to final round
4	Montenegro	5	2	3	319	340	−21	7 (Note: Montenegro 3pts/140:148 (−8) :: Montenegro–Belarus 77–72, Montenegro–Greece 63–76)	Advance to final round
5	Greece	5	2	3	299	328	−29	7 (Note: Greece 3pts/133:145 (−12) :: Belarus–Greece 82–57. Montenegro–Greece 63–76)	
6	Czech Republic	5	1	4	319	359	−40	6	

Source: eurobasketwomen2015.com
Notes:

17 June 2015
Turkey	61–41	Montenegro
Czech Republic	73–70	Belarus
Greece	42–51	France
19 June 2015
Montenegro	77–72	Belarus
Greece	74–71	Czech Republic
France	56–66	Turkey
21 June 2015
Turkey	59–48	Czech Republic
Montenegro	63–76	Greece
Belarus	58–64	France

=== Group F ===
Pos	Team	Pld	W	L	PF	PA	PD	Pts	Qualification
1	Spain	5	5	0	406	328	+78	10	Advance to final round
2	Lithuania	5	3	2	371	367	+4	8 (Note: Lithuania–Russia 78–74)	Advance to final round
3	Russia	5	3	2	366	320	+46	8	Advance to final round
4	Serbia	5	2	3	370	387	−17	7 (Note: Slovakia–Serbia 74–76)	Advance to final round
5	Slovakia	5	2	3	385	374	+11	7	
6	Croatia	5	0	5	312	434	−122	5	

Source: eurobasketwomen2015.com
Notes:

18 June 2015
Slovakia	74–76	Serbia
Lithuania	78–74	Russia
Croatia	52–95	Spain
20 June 2015
Lithuania	83–64	Croatia
Russia	75–61	Slovakia
Serbia	80–91	Spain
22 June 2015
Slovakia	84–62	Croatia
Spain	66–57	Russia
Serbia	72–73	Lithuania

== Final round ==
Quarterfinals
24 June
Turkey	63
Serbia	75
24 June
Lithuania	66
Belarus	68
25 June
France	77
Russia	74
25 June
Spain	75
Montenegro	74

Semifinals
26 June
Serbia	74
Belarus	72
26 June
France	63
Spain	58

Final
28 June
Serbia	76
France	68
Third place
28 June
Belarus	58
Spain	74

5–8th place bracket

5–8th place semifinals
25 June
Turkey	66
Lithuania	57
26 June
Russia	73
Montenegro	65

Fifth place
27 June
Turkey	68
Russia	66
Seventh place
27 June
Lithuania	77
Montenegro	89

=== Final ===
28 June 2015
19:00

Boxscore

Serbia	76–68	France
Scoring by quarter: 15–22, 18–10, 20–17, 23–19
Pts: A. Dabović 25; Rebs: Page 8 Asts: A. Dabović 3		Pts: Gruda 16; Rebs: Yacoubou 6 Asts: Dumerc 5

Syma Sport and Events Centre, Budapest
Attendance: 5,200
Referees: Karen Lasuik (CAN), Anne Panther (GER), Maj Forsberg (DEN)

== Final ranking ==
Qualified for the 2016 Olympic Games
Qualified for the 2016 FIBA World; Olympic Qualifying Tournament

Rank	Team	Record
Gold medal	Serbia	7–3
Silver medal	France	8–2
Bronze medal	Spain	9–1
4th	Belarus	5–5
5th	Turkey	8–2
6th	Russia	5–5
7th	Montenegro	5–5
8th	Lithuania	5–5
9th	Slovakia	3–4
10th	Greece	4–3
11th	Czech Republic	3–4
12th	Croatia	2–5
13th	Latvia	2–2
14th	Sweden	1–3
15th	Italy	1–3
16th	Ukraine	1–3
17th	Hungary	1–3
18th	Poland	0–4
19th	Romania	0–4
20th	Great Britain	0–4

== Statistics and awards ==
=== Statistical leaders ===
Points

Name	PPG
(Spain) Alba Torrens	19.7
(France) Sandrine Gruda	17.8
(Slovakia) Kristi Toliver	17.4
(Turkey) Lara Sanders	16.7
(Montenegro) Angel Robinson	15.9

Rebounds

Name	RPG
(Belarus) Yelena Leuchanka	11.5
(Montenegro) Angel Robinson	8.9
(Turkey) Lara Sanders	8.4
(France) Sandrine Gruda	8.2
(Spain) Astou Ndour	7.9

Assists

Name	APG
(Montenegro) Jelena Škerović	7.1
(France) Céline Dumerc	5.9
(Turkey) Işıl Alben	5.5
(Belarus) Lindsey Harding	5.3
(Czech Republic) Veronika Bortelová	5.3

Blocks

Name	BPG
(Turkey) Lara Sanders	2.0
(Slovakia) Anna Jurčenková	1.9
(Russia) Natalia Vieru	1.8
(Belarus) Anastasiya Verameyenka	1.3
(Montenegro) Angel Robinson	1.0
(Serbia) Danielle Page	1.0
(Croatia) Luca Ivanković	1.0

Steals

Name	SPG
(Turkey) Işıl Alben	2.5
(Lithuania) Sandra Linkevičienė	2.1
(Russia) Epiphanny Prince	1.9
(Belarus) Katsiaryna Snytsina	1.7
(Serbia) Milica Dabović	1.6
(Spain) Marta Xargay	1.6

=== Awards ===
Guard	Center	Forward
All-star team
(Serbia) Ana Dabović (France) Céline Dumerc	(France) Sandrine Gruda	(Spain) Alba Torrens (Serbia) Sonja Petrović
MVP: (Serbia) Ana Dabović
