= EuroBasket Women 2015 Group B =

Group B of the EuroBasket Women 2015 took place between 11 and 15 June 2015. The group played all of its games at Arena Antonio Alexe in Oradea, Romania.

The group composed of Belarus, Greece, Italy, Poland and Turkey. The three best ranked teams advanced to the second round.

== Standings ==
Pos	Team	Pld	W	L	PF	PA	PD	Pts	Qualification
1	Belarus	4	4	0	299	234	+65	8	Advance to second round
2	Turkey	4	3	1	220	215	+5	7	Advance to second round
3	Greece	4	2	2	217	239	−22	6	Advance to second round
4	Italy	4	1	3	232	241	−9	5	
5	Poland	4	0	4	208	247	−39	4	

Source: eurobasketwomen2015.com

All times are local (UTC+3).

== 11 June ==
=== Poland vs Turkey ===
11 June 2015
18:00

Boxscore

Poland	54–57	Turkey
Scoring by quarter: 17–11, 16–15, 9–17, 12–14
Pts: Kobryn 24; Rebs: Kobryn 7 Asts: McBride, Żurowska 3		Pts: Sanders 16; Rebs: Sanders 7 Asts: Vardarlı 8

Arena Antonio Alexe, Oradea
Attendance: 100
Referees: Carlos Peruga (ESP), Semen Ovinov (RUS), Jelena Tomić (CRO)

=== Italy vs Belarus ===
11 June 2015
20:30

Boxscore

Italy	76–85 (OT)	Belarus
Scoring by quarter: 14–14, 18–19, 16–20, 25–20, Overtime: 3–12
Pts: Sottana 19; Rebs: Ress 8 Asts: five players 2		Pts: Leuchanka 25; Rebs: Leuchanka 14; Asts: Verameyenka 6

Arena Antonio Alexe, Oradea
Attendance: 150
Referees: Jasmina Juras (SRB), Andris Aunkrogers (LAT), Ilias Kounelles (CYP)

== 12 June ==
=== Greece vs Italy ===
12 June 2015
18:00

Boxscore

Greece	51–46	Italy
Scoring by quarter: 9–18, 16–4, 6–15, 20–9
Pts: Sotiriou 13; Rebs: Spanou 10; Asts: Lymoura 5		Pts: Ress 13; Rebs: Ress 11; Asts: Ress 3

Arena Antonio Alexe, Oradea
Attendance: 150
Referees: Semen Ovinov (RUS), Carlos Peruga (ESP), Marek Kúkelčík (SVK)

=== Belarus vs Poland ===
12 June 2015
20:30

Boxscore

Belarus	65–49	Poland
Scoring by quarter: 23–18, 11–6, 21–12, 10–13
Pts: Snytsina 13; Rebs: Leuchanka 15; Asts: Troina 7		Pts: Żurowska 13; Rebs: Krezel, Koc 6 Asts: Owczarzak 4

Arena Antonio Alexe, Oradea
Attendance: 150
Referees: Andris Aunkrogers (LAT), Jasmina Juras (SRB), Ilias Kounelles (CYP)

== 13 June ==
=== Poland vs Greece ===
13 June 2015
18:00

Boxscore

Poland	50–59	Greece
Scoring by quarter: 25–15, 4–11, 9–20, 12–13
Pts: Kobryn 11; Rebs: Żurowska 7 Asts: McBride 6		Pts: Kaltsidou 13; Rebs: Spanou 10; Asts: Lymoura 4

Arena Antonio Alexe, Oradea
Attendance: 150
Referees: Jasmina Juras (SRB), Andris Aunkrogers (LAT), Jelena Tomić (CRO)

=== Turkey vs Belarus ===
13 June 2015
20:30

Boxscore

Turkey	52–67	Belarus
Scoring by quarter: 13–15, 8–11, 17–25, 14–16
Pts: Yılmaz 12; Rebs: Yılmaz 7 Asts: Vardarlı 5		Pts: Leuchanka 15; Rebs: Leuchanka 10; Asts: Harding 6

Arena Antonio Alexe, Oradea
Attendance: 150
Referees: Carlos Peruga (ESP), Semen Ovinov (RUS), Marek Kúkelčík (SVK)

== 14 June ==
=== Italy vs Poland ===
14 June 2015
18:00

Boxscore

Italy	66–55	Poland
Scoring by quarter: 17–22, 18–9, 16–20, 15–4
Pts: Sottana 17; Rebs: Ress 9 Asts: Sottana 5		Pts: Kobryn 17; Rebs: Koc, Kobryn 8 Asts: McBride 4

Arena Antonio Alexe, Oradea
Attendance: 150
Referees: Semen Ovinov (RUS), Marek Kúkelčík (SVK), Ilias Kounelles (CYP)

=== Greece vs Turkey ===
14 June 2015
20:30

Boxscore

Greece	50–61	Turkey
Scoring by quarter: 13–14, 17–11, 6–16, 14–20
Pts: Dimitrakou, Kaltsidou 12; Rebs: Kaltsidou 10; Asts: Lymoura 4		Pts: Sanders 18; Rebs: Sanders 12; Asts: Vardarlı 5

Arena Antonio Alexe, Oradea
Attendance: 150
Referees: Andris Aunkrogers (LAT), Jasmina Juras (SRB), Jelena Tomić (CRO)

== 15 June ==
=== Belarus vs Greece ===
15 June 2015
18:00

Boxscore

Belarus	82–57	Greece
Scoring by quarter: 17–16, 24–7, 25–12, 16–22
Pts: Papova 20; Rebs: Leuchanka 11; Asts: Verameyenka 6		Pts: Dimitrakou 14; Rebs: Dimitrakou, Chatzinikolaou 4 Asts: Spanou 4

Arena Antonio Alexe, Oradea
Attendance: 150
Referees: Carlos Peruga (ESP), Semen Ovinov (RUS), Ilias Kounelles (CYP)

=== Turkey vs Italy ===
15 June 2015
20:30

Boxscore

Turkey	50–44	Italy
Scoring by quarter: 18–14, 13–5, 13–14, 6–11
Pts: Yılmaz 12; Rebs: Sanders 12; Asts: Alben 7		Pts: Masciadri 13; Rebs: Ress 9 Asts: Sottana 3

Arena Antonio Alexe, Oradea
Attendance: 150
Referees: Jasmina Juras (SRB), Andris Aunkrogers (LAT), Jelena Tomić (CRO)
