= EuroBasket Women 2015 Group A =

Group A of the EuroBasket Women 2015 took place between 11 and 15 June 2015. The group played all of its games at Politehnica University of Timișoara in Timișoara, Romania.

The group composed of Czech Republic, France, Montenegro, Romania and Ukraine. The three best ranked teams advanced to the second round.

== Standings ==
Pos	Team	Pld	W	L	PF	PA	PD	Pts	Qualification
1	France	4	4	0	319	264	+55	8	Advance to second round
2	Montenegro	4	3	1	301	263	+38	7	Advance to second round
3	Czech Republic	4	2	2	289	306	−17	6	Advance to second round
4	Ukraine	4	1	3	283	314	−31	5	
5	Romania	4	0	4	270	315	−45	4	

Source: eurobasketwomen2015.com

All times are local (UTC+3).

== 11 June ==
=== Montenegro vs Czech Republic ===
11 June 2015
18:00

Boxscore

Montenegro	71–52	Czech Republic
Scoring by quarter: 20–14, 14–13, 17–11, 20–14
Pts: Robinson 13; Rebs: Robinson 13; Asts: Škerović 6		Pts: Zrůstová 16; Rebs: Hanušová 6 Asts: Bartoňová 5

Sala Polivalentă, Timișoara
Attendance: 300
Referees: Anne Panther (GER), Maj Forsberg (DEN), Artūras Šukys (LTU)

=== Ukraine vs France ===
11 June 2015
20:30

Boxscore

Ukraine	55–79	France
Scoring by quarter: 21–20, 12–15, 12–24, 10–20
Pts: Iagupova 19; Rebs: Khomenchuk 5 Asts: Dubrovina 4		Pts: Gruda 18; Rebs: Gruda 15; Asts: Dumerc 7

Sala Polivalentă, Timișoara
Attendance: 200
Referees: Erez Gurion (ISR), Asa Jernmo (SWE), Gellért Kapitány (HUN)

== 12 June ==
=== Czech Republic vs Ukraine ===
12 June 2015
18:00

Boxscore

Czech Republic	80–79	Ukraine
Scoring by quarter: 31–17, 17–21, 14–17, 18–24
Pts: Elhotová, Hanušová 23; Rebs: Veselá 9 Asts: Bortelová 10		Pts: Iagupova 32; Rebs: Dorogobuzova 9 Asts: Dubrovina 5

Sala Polivalentă, Timișoara
Attendance: 350
Referees: Erez Gurion (ISR), Gellért Kapitány (HUN), Gavin Williams (WAL)

=== Romania vs Montenegro ===
12 June 2015
20:30

Boxscore

Romania	61–79	Montenegro
Scoring by quarter: 18–26, 4–25, 18–15, 21–13
Pts: Mărginean 18; Rebs: Ursu 7 Asts: Mărginean 6		Pts: Dubljević 19; Rebs: Perovanović 9 Asts: Škerović 10

Sala Polivalentă, Timișoara
Attendance: 800
Referees: Anne Panther (GER), Maj Forsberg (DEN), Artūras Šukys (LTU)

== 13 June ==
=== France vs Czech Republic ===
13 June 2015
18:00

Boxscore

France	85–75	Czech Republic
Scoring by quarter: 28–17, 16–28, 23–13, 18–17
Pts: Gruda 26; Rebs: Tchatchouang 7 Asts: Dumerc 7		Pts: Elhotová 20; Rebs: Hanušová, Veselá 5 Asts: Bortelová 8

Sala Polivalentă, Timișoara
Attendance: 180
Referees: Anne Panther (GER), Erez Gurion (ISR), Gellért Kapitány (HUN)

=== Ukraine vs Romania ===
13 June 2015
20:30

Boxscore

Ukraine	78–71	Romania
Scoring by quarter: 19–24, 13–12, 25–20, 21–15
Pts: Iagupova 33; Rebs: Iagupova 7 Asts: Samburska 4		Pts: Pop 14; Rebs: Pavel 10; Asts: Părău 9

Sala Polivalentă, Timișoara
Attendance: 500
Referees: Maj Forsberg (DEN), Asa Jernmo (SWE), Gavin Williams (WAL)

== 14 June ==
=== Montenegro vs Ukraine ===
14 June 2015
18:00

Boxscore

Montenegro	84–71	Ukraine
Scoring by quarter: 25–21, 24–14, 18–27, 17–9
Pts: Robinson 18; Rebs: Robinson 8 Asts: Škerović 13		Pts: Iagupova 33; Rebs: Iagupova 7 Asts: Iagupova, Samburska 4

Sala Polivalentă, Timișoara
Attendance: 350
Referees: Artūras Šukys (LTU), Maj Forsberg (DEN), Gellért Kapitány (HUN)

=== Romania vs France ===
14 June 2015
20:30

Boxscore

Romania	67–76	France
Scoring by quarter: 18–20, 22–17, 20–17, 7–22
Pts: Pop, Stoenescu 14; Rebs: Pavel 8 Asts: Părău 5		Pts: Salagnac 17; Rebs: Gruda 9 Asts: Dumerc 8

Sala Polivalentă, Timișoara
Attendance: 800
Referees: Erez Gurion (ISR), Asa Jernmo (SWE), Gavin Williams (WAL)

== 15 June ==
=== France vs Montenegro ===
15 June 2015
18:00

Boxscore

France	79–67	Montenegro
Scoring by quarter: 26–16, 21–20, 20–13, 12–18
Pts: Gruda 25; Rebs: Gruda 8 Asts: Dumerc 7		Pts: Perovanović 18; Rebs: Perovanović 6 Asts: Škerović 5

Sala Polivalentă, Timișoara
Attendance: 500
Referees: Erez Gurion (ISR), Maj Forsberg (DEN), Gavin Williams (WAL)

=== Czech Republic vs Romania ===
15 June 2015
20:30

Boxscore

Czech Republic	82–71	Romania
Scoring by quarter: 20–18, 19–17, 24–18, 19–18
Pts: Hanušová 24; Rebs: Hanušová, Veselá 6 Asts: Bortelová 7		Pts: Mărginean 22; Rebs: Mărginean 9 Asts: Părău 9

Sala Polivalentă, Timișoara
Attendance: 800
Referees: Anne Panther (GER), Gellért Kapitány (HUN), Artūras Šukys (LTU)
