= 2016 FIBA World Olympic Qualifying Tournament for Women =

2016 FIBA World Olympic Qualifying Tournament
For Women

Tournament details
- Host country: France
- Dates: 13–19 June
- Teams: 12 (from 5 federations)
- Venue: 1 (in 1 host city)

Tournament statistics
- Top scorer: (France) Endéné Miyem (16.7)
- Top rebounds: (Belarus) Yelena Leuchanka (South Korea) Park Ji-su (10.8)
- Top assists: (France) Céline Dumerc (7.7)
- PPG (Team): France (81.0)
- RPG (Team): France (52.7)
- APG (Team): France (25.0)

Official website
- Website

The 2016 FIBA World Olympic Qualifying Tournament for Women was a women's basketball tournament that consisted of 12 national teams, where the top five teams earned a place in the 2016 Summer Olympics basketball tournament. It was held from 13 to 19 June 2016. France hosted the tournament in the city of Nantes.

Belarus, China, France, Spain and Turkey qualified for the 2016 Summer Olympics.

== Format ==
The 12 teams were divided into four groups (Groups A–D) for the preliminary round. The top two teams from each group qualified for the knockout round. All four quarterfinal winners advanced to the medal rounds; the four quarterfinal losers played two rounds to allocate the final slot.

== Hosts selection ==
On 26 September 2015, FIBA announced that France and Spain were the candidates to host the women's qualification tournaments. The deadline to submit the final candidature was set on 11 November, following which an evaluation of all bids would take place. France was announced as host of the Olympic qualifier on 19 January 2016.

== Qualification ==
Competition	Vacancies	Qualified
EuroBasket Women 2015	4 teams	France (hosts); Spain; Belarus; Turkey
2015 FIBA Americas Women's Championship	3 teams	Cuba; Argentina; Venezuela
AfroBasket Women 2015	2 teams	Cameroon; Nigeria
2015 FIBA Asia Women's Championship	2 teams	China; South Korea
2015 FIBA Oceania Women's Championship	1 team	New Zealand

== Draw ==
The draw was held at 26 January 2016 at the FIBA headquarters in Mies, Switzerland.

Pot 1	Pot 2	Pot 3
France; Spain; Belarus; Turkey	Cuba; Argentina; China; South Korea	New Zealand; Cameroon; Nigeria; Venezuela

== Referees ==
The following referees were selected for the tournament.

- (Albania) Gentian Cici
- (Brazil) Andreia Silva
- (Canada) Maripier Malo
- (France) Nicolas Maestre
- (France) Yohan Rosso
- (India) Snehal Bendke
- (Israel) Amit Balak
- (Namibia) Sarty Nghixulifwa
- (Panama) Julio Anaya
- (Poland) Tomasz Trawicki
- (Saudi Arabia) Hatim Al-Harbi
- (Serbia) Jasmina Juras
- (United States) Amy Bonner
- (Zimbabwe) Joyce Muchenu

== Preliminary round ==
=== Group A ===
Pos	Team	Pld	W	L	PF	PA	PD	Pts	Qualification
1	France (H)	2	2	0	153	119	+34	4	Quarterfinals
2	Cuba	2	1	1	131	145	−14	3	Quarterfinals
3	New Zealand	2	0	2	114	134	−20	2	

Source: FIBA
Rules for classification: 1) Points; 2) Head-to-head results; 3) Points difference; 4) Points scored.
(H) Hosts

13 June 2016
20:30

Boxscore

Cuba	67–83	France
Scoring by quarter: 15–20, 14–30, 18–19, 20–14
Pts: Noblet 17; Rebs: Noblet 11; Asts: Casanova, Gelis 5		Pts: Miyem 19; Rebs: Yacoubou 7 Asts: Michel 8

La Trocardière, Nantes
Attendance: 3,700
Referees: Amy Bonner (USA), Amit Balak (ISR), Snehal Bendke (IND)

14 June 2016
20:30

Boxscore

France	70–52	New Zealand
Scoring by quarter: 16–17, 11–12, 25–17, 18–6
Pts: Yacoubou 19; Rebs: Yacoubou 11; Asts: Dumerc 8		Pts: Edmondson 10; Rebs: Edmondson, Purcell 6 Asts: Cocks 3

La Trocardière, Nantes
Attendance: 3,400
Referees: Maripier Malo (CAN), Gentian Cici (ALB), Joyce Muchenu (ZIM)

15 June 2016
15:00

Boxscore

New Zealand	62–64	Cuba
Scoring by quarter: 10–14, 14–18, 15–16, 23–16
Pts: Harmon 25; Rebs: Harmon 14; Asts: Cocks, Edmondson 6		Pts: Gelis 16; Rebs: Noblet 10; Asts: Gelis 3

La Trocardière, Nantes
Attendance: 800
Referees: Amy Bonner (USA), Amit Balak (ISR), Jasmina Juras (SRB)

=== Group B ===
Pos	Team	Pld	W	L	PF	PA	PD	Pts	Qualification
1	Turkey	2	2	0	138	84	+54	4	Quarterfinals
2	Argentina	2	1	1	113	130	−17	3	Quarterfinals
3	Cameroon	2	0	2	110	147	−37	2	

Source: FIBA
Rules for classification: 1) Points; 2) Head-to-head results; 3) Points difference; 4) Points scored.

13 June 2016
15:00

Boxscore

Cameroon	64–75	Argentina
Scoring by quarter: 13–21, 10–22, 19–17, 22–15
Pts: Lonlack 25; Rebs: Dongmo 7 Asts: T. Weledji 5		Pts: Gretter, Vega 15; Rebs: Vega 9 Asts: Gretter 6

La Trocardière, Nantes
Attendance: 1,250
Referees: Maripier Malo (CAN), Jasmina Juras (SRB), Tomasz Trawicki (POL)

14 June 2016
18:00

Boxscore

Argentina	38–66	Turkey
Scoring by quarter: 4–18, 13–15, 4–20, 17–13
Pts: Vega 8 Rebs: Vega 9 Asts: González 3		Pts: Sanders 18; Rebs: Sanders 15; Asts: Vardarlı 10

La Trocardière, Nantes
Attendance: 1,600
Referees: Andreia Silva (BRA), Snehal Bendke (IND), Jasmina Juras (SRB)

15 June 2016
20:30

Boxscore

Turkey	72–46	Cameroon
Scoring by quarter: 20–8, 21–7, 17–17, 14–14
Pts: Sanders 12; Rebs: Sanders 9 Asts: Alben 6		Pts: Ngo Ndjock 14; Rebs: Starling 7 Asts: Ngo Ndjock, Starling 2

La Trocardière, Nantes
Attendance: 960
Referees: Andreia Silva (BRA), Hatim Al-Harbi (KSA), Julio Anaya (PAN)

=== Group C ===
Pos	Team	Pld	W	L	PF	PA	PD	Pts	Qualification
1	Belarus	2	1	1	136	126	+10	3	Quarterfinals
2	South Korea	2	1	1	135	135	0	3	Quarterfinals
3	Nigeria	2	1	1	130	140	−10	3	

Source: FIBA
Rules for classification: 1) Points; 2) Head-to-head results; 3) Points difference; 4) Points scored.

13 June 2016
18:00

Boxscore

Belarus	71–60	Nigeria
Scoring by quarter: 14–14, 24–18, 20–13, 13–15
Pts: Leuchanka 15; Rebs: Leuchanka 13; Asts: Leuchanka, Likhtarovich 5		Pts: Elonu 19; Rebs: Ugoka 9 Asts: Kalu 4

La Trocardière, Nantes
Attendance: 1,950
Referees: Andreia Silva (BRA), Hatim Al-Harbi (KSA), Julio Anaya (PAN)

14 June 2016
12:30

Boxscore

Nigeria	70–69	South Korea
Scoring by quarter: 13–20, 15–13, 19–18, 23–18
Pts: Ekworomadu 14; Rebs: Sanni 10; Asts: Elonu 4		Pts: Kang A. 22; Rebs: Park J. 16; Asts: Lee S. 8

La Trocardière, Nantes
Attendance: 300
Referees: Nicholas Maestre (FRA), Sarty Nghixulifwa (NAM), Yohan Rosso (FRA)

15 June 2016
12:30

Boxscore

South Korea	66–65	Belarus
Scoring by quarter: 24–22, 20–19, 12–14, 10–10
Pts: Kang A. 18; Rebs: Park J. 14; Asts: Lee S. 4		Pts: Verameyenka 15; Rebs: Leuchanka 9 Asts: Harding 7

La Trocardière, Nantes
Attendance: 510
Referees: Maripier Malo (CAN), Yohan Rosso (FRA), Tomasz Trawicki (POL)

=== Group D ===
Pos	Team	Pld	W	L	PF	PA	PD	Pts	Qualification
1	Spain	2	2	0	160	98	+62	4	Quarterfinals
2	China	2	1	1	120	136	−16	3	Quarterfinals
3	Venezuela	2	0	2	114	160	−46	2	

Source: FIBA
Rules for classification: 1) Points; 2) Head-to-head results; 3) Points difference; 4) Points scored.

13 June 2016
12:30

Boxscore

Venezuela	59–77	China
Scoring by quarter: 16–20, 8–22, 13–21, 22–11
Pts: Pérez 23; Rebs: Silva 9 Asts: Pérez 6		Pts: Sun Mengx. 21; Rebs: Zhao 9 Asts: Zhao 8

La Trocardière, Nantes
Attendance: 1,650
Referees: Nicholas Maestre (FRA), Gentian Cici (ALB), Joyce Muchenu (ZIM)

14 June 2016
15:00

Boxscore

China	43–77	Spain
Scoring by quarter: 8–15, 13–20, 14–19, 8–23
Pts: Shao 9 Rebs: Sun Mengx. 6 Asts: Lu 3		Pts: Torrens 22; Rebs: Lyttle 13; Asts: Palau 8

La Trocardière, Nantes
Attendance: 500
Referees: Amy Bonner (USA), Julio Anaya (PAN), Tomasz Trawicki (POL)

15 June 2016
18:00

Boxscore

Spain	83–55	Venezuela
Scoring by quarter: 17–7, 24–15, 22–12, 20–21
Pts: Rodríguez 24; Rebs: Pascua 9 Asts: three players 4		Pts: Silva 16; Rebs: Pérez 7 Asts: Márquez, Pérez 5

La Trocardière, Nantes
Attendance: 650
Referees: Nicholas Maestre (FRA), Gentian Cici (ALB), Sarty Nghixulifwa (NAM)

== Knockout round ==
The four quarterfinal winners and the winner of the fifth place game qualified for the 2016 Summer Olympics.

Quarterfinals
France	90
Argentina	53
Belarus	70
China	84
Turkey	71
Cuba	45
Spain	70
South Korea	50

Semifinals (quarterfinal losers)
Argentina	44
Belarus	84
Cuba	62
South Korea	81

Fifth place game
Belarus	56
South Korea	39

=== Quarterfinals ===
17 June 2016
12:30

Boxscore

Spain	70–50	South Korea
Scoring by quarter: 19–11, 17–14, 15–12, 19–13
Pts: Lyttle 20; Rebs: Lyttle 13; Asts: Torrens 4		Pts: Park J. 10; Rebs: Park H. 4 Asts: Park H. 5

La Trocardière, Nantes
Attendance: 900
Referees: Nicholas Maestre (FRA), Joyce Muchenu (ZIM), Yohan Rosso (FRA)

17 June 2016
15:00

Boxscore

Turkey	71–45	Cuba
Scoring by quarter: 16–12, 26–12, 14–16, 15–5
Pts: Sanders 18; Rebs: Yılmaz 10; Asts: Vardarlı 6		Pts: Casanova 15; Rebs: Cepeda 8 Asts: Gelis 2

La Trocardière, Nantes
Attendance: 1,200
Referees: Gentian Cici (ALB), Snehal Bendke (IND), Tomasz Trawicki (POL)

17 June 2016
18:00

Boxscore

Belarus	70–84	China
Scoring by quarter: 16–14, 12–18, 14–29, 28–23
Pts: Harding 22; Rebs: Leuchanka 9 Asts: Harding 6		Pts: Shao 18; Rebs: Chen N. 7 Asts: three players 5

La Trocardière, Nantes
Attendance: 2,300
Referees: Amy Bonner (USA), Jasmina Juras (SRB), Andreia Silva (BRA)

17 June 2016
20:30

Boxscore

France	90–53	Argentina
Scoring by quarter: 18–15, 28–11, 19–11, 25–16
Pts: Miyem 21; Rebs: Ciak 9 Asts: Dumerc 10		Pts: Rosset 12; Rebs: Cabrera, Vega 4 Asts: Gretter 5

La Trocardière, Nantes
Attendance: 4,238
Referees: Maripier Malo (CAN), Amit Balak (ISR), Sarty Nghixulifwa (NAM)

=== Semifinals ===
18 June 2016
18:00

Boxscore

Cuba	62–81	South Korea
Scoring by quarter: 20–21, 15–25, 16-15, 11–20
Pts: Oquendo 19; Rebs: Noblet 8 Asts: Casanova, Romero 3		Pts: Kang A. 22; Rebs: Park J. 10; Asts: Lee S. 8

La Trocardière, Nantes
Attendance: 1,500
Referees: Maripier Malo (CAN), Jasmina Juras (SRB), Yohan Rosso (FRA)

18 June 2016
20:30

Boxscore

Argentina	44–84	Belarus
Scoring by quarter: 3–20, 13–26, 12–21, 16–17
Pts: Burani 11; Rebs: Burani 9 Asts: six players 1		Pts: Likhtarovich 19; Rebs: Leuchanka 12; Asts: Troina 7

La Trocardière, Nantes
Attendance: 1,800
Referees: Amy Bonner (USA), Gentian Cici (ALB), Andreia Silva (BRA)

=== Fifth place game ===
19 June 2016
15:00

Boxscore

Belarus	56–39	South Korea
Scoring by quarter: 12–8, 15–8, 12–12, 17–11
Pts: Harding 17; Rebs: Verameyenka 15; Asts: Harding, Leuchanka 3		Pts: Kim 11; Rebs: Park J. 12; Asts: Lim, Yang 2

La Trocardière, Nantes
Attendance: 2,200
Referees: Amy Bonner (USA), Nicolas Maestre (FRA), Maripier Malo (CAN)

== Final ranking ==
#	Team	W–L	Qualification
1	Spain	3–0	2016 Olympics
1	Turkey	3–0	2016 Olympics
1	France	3–0	2016 Olympics
1	China	2–1	2016 Olympics
5	Belarus	3–2	2016 Olympics
6	South Korea	2–3	
7	Cuba	1–3	
8	Argentina	1–3	
9	Nigeria	1–1	
10	New Zealand	0–2	
11	Cameroon	0–2	
12	Venezuela	0–2	

== Statistical leaders ==
=== Players ===
Points

Pos.	Name	PPG
1	(France) Endéné Miyem	16.7
2	(Turkey) Lara Sanders	16.0
3	(Spain) Sancho Lyttle	15.7
4	(Spain) Alba Torrens	15.3
5	(South Korea) Kang A-jeong	14.0

Rebounds

Pos.	Name	RPG
1	(Belarus) Yelena Leuchanka	10.8
1	(South Korea) Park Ji-su	10.8
3	(Spain) Sancho Lyttle	10.3
4	(Turkey) Lara Sanders	10.0
5	(France) Isabelle Yacoubou	8.7

Assists

Pos.	Name	APG
1	(France) Céline Dumerc	7.7
2	(Turkey) Birsel Vardarlı	7.0
3	(Turkey) Isil Alben	4.7
3	(France) Sarah Michel	4.7
5	(China) Zhao Zhifang	4.3

Steals

Pos.	Name	SPG
1	(Spain) Sancho Lyttle	3.7
2	(Turkey) Birsel Vardarlı	2.7
3	(Turkey) Isil Alben	2.3
4	(Cuba) Arlenys Romero	2.0
5	(South Korea) Kang A-jeong	1.8

Blocks

Pos.	Name	BPG
1	(Belarus) Anastasiya Verameyenka	2.8
2	(Turkey) Lara Sanders	2.0
3	(South Korea) Park Ji-su	1.6
4	(China) Huang Hongpin	1.0
4	(France) Isabelle Yacoubou	1.0

Other statistical leaders

Stat	Name	Avg.
Field goal percentage	(France) Endéné Miyem	59.4%
3-point FG percentage	(Turkey) Şebnem Kimyacıoğlu	56.3%
Free throw percentage	(Turkey) Lara Sanders	100.0%
Turnovers	(Belarus) Yelena Leuchanka	4.2
Fouls	(Belarus) Maryia Papova	3.6

=== Teams ===
Points

Pos.	Name	PPG
1	France	81.0
2	Spain	76.7
3	Turkey	69.7
4	Belarus	69.2
5	China	68.0

Rebounds

Pos.	Name	RPG
1	France	52.7
2	Spain	44.0
2	Turkey	44.0
4	China	42.3
5	Belarus	40.8

Assists

Pos.	Name	APG
1	France	25.0
2	Turkey	21.3
3	Spain	20.7
4	China	20.3
5	Belarus	18.2

Steals

Pos.	Name	SPG
1	Turkey	10.0
2	Spain	8.7
3	China	7.7
4	Belarus	7.6
5	South Korea	7.2

Blocks

Pos.	Name	BPG
1	France	4.0
2	Belarus	3.6
3	China	3.0
4	Turkey	2.7
5	South Korea	2.4

== See also ==
- Basketball at the 2016 Summer Olympics
- 2016 FIBA World Olympic Qualifying Tournaments for Men
