= EuroBasket Women 2015 Group C =

Group C of the EuroBasket Women 2015 took place between 11 and 15 June 2015. The group played all of its games at Arena Savaria in Szombathely, Hungary.

The group composed of Croatia, Great Britain, Latvia, Russia and Serbia. The three best ranked teams advanced to the second round.

== Standings ==
Pos	Team	Pld	W	L	PF	PA	PD	Pts	Qualification
1	Russia	4	3	1	293	223	+70	7 (Note: Russia–Serbia 77–53)	Advance to second round
2	Serbia	4	3	1	294	263	+31	7	Advance to second round
3	Croatia	4	2	2	277	305	−28	6 (Note: Croatia–Latvia 67–63)	Advance to second round
4	Latvia	4	2	2	258	263	−5	6	
5	Great Britain	4	0	4	222	290	−68	4	

Source: eurobasketwomen2015.com
Notes:

All times are local (UTC+2).

== 11 June ==
=== Latvia vs Serbia ===
11 June 2015
16:30

Boxscore

Latvia	60–76	Serbia
Scoring by quarter: 19–21, 18–18, 11–19, 12–18
Pts: Jēkabsone-Žogota 11; Rebs: Vitola 16; Asts: Baško-Melnbārde 5		Pts: Petrović 19; Rebs: Butulija, Radočaj 6 Asts: M. Dabović 5

Arena Savaria, Szombathely
Attendance: 200
Referees: Fabiana Martinescu (ROU), Janusz Calik (POL), Özlem Yalman (TUR)

=== Russia vs Croatia ===
11 June 2015
19:00

Boxscore

Russia	83–62	Croatia
Scoring by quarter: 22–13, 20–19, 23–7, 18–23
Pts: Prince 16; Rebs: Osipova 10; Asts: Osipova 6		Pts: Ciglar 17; Rebs: Ivanković 8 Asts: Mazić 4

Arena Savaria, Szombathely
Attendance: 200
Referees: Manuel Mazzoni (ITA), Ilona Kučerová (CZE), Mila Cavara (BIH)

== 12 June ==
=== Croatia vs Latvia ===
12 June 2015
16:30

Boxscore

Croatia	67–63	Latvia
Scoring by quarter: 20–19, 16–10, 12–14, 19–20
Pts: Slišković 15; Rebs: Ivanković 10; Asts: Milogla 3		Pts: Šteinberga 24; Rebs: Šteinberga 8 Asts: Eglīte, Jēkabsone 4

Arena Savaria, Szombathely
Attendance: 110
Referees: Janusz Calik (POL), Manuel Mazzoni (ITA), Sonia Teixeira (POR)

=== Great Britain vs Russia ===
12 June 2015
19:00

Boxscore

Great Britain	40–71	Russia
Scoring by quarter: 13–25, 9–13, 12–13, 6–20
Pts: Stewart 10; Rebs: Allen 8 Asts: Allen 2		Pts: Vadeeva 13; Rebs: Vadeeva 8 Asts: Namok, Kirillova, Tikhonenko 3

Arena Savaria, Szombathely
Attendance: 110
Referees: Ilona Kučerová (CZE), Fabiana Martinescu (ROU), Özlem Yalman (TUR)

== 13 June ==
=== Latvia vs Great Britain ===
13 June 2015
16:30

Boxscore

Latvia	67–58	Great Britain
Scoring by quarter: 20–20, 6–7, 23–11, 18–20
Pts: Šteinberga 25; Rebs: Eglīte, Vitola 7 Asts: Jēkabsone 6		Pts: Fagbenle 22; Rebs: Handy 6 Asts: Vanderwal 3

Arena Savaria, Szombathely
Attendance: 150
Referees: Ilona Kučerová (CZE), Özlem Yalman (TUR), Mila Cavara (BIH)

=== Serbia vs Croatia ===
13 June 2015
19:00

Boxscore

Serbia	89–72	Croatia
Scoring by quarter: 19–20, 25–20, 26–17, 19–15
Pts: Milovanović 18; Rebs: Ajduković 8 Asts: A. Dabović 5		Pts: Borović 17; Rebs: Mazić 7 Asts: Ciglar, Slišković 4

Arena Savaria, Szombathely
Attendance: 400
Referees: Fabiana Martinescu (ROU), Janusz Calik (POL), Sonia Teixeira (POR)

== 14 June ==
=== Great Britain vs Serbia ===
14 June 2015
16:30

Boxscore

Great Britain	54–76	Serbia
Scoring by quarter: 12–21, 14–15, 12–28, 16–12
Pts: Vanderwal 13; Rebs: Fagbenle 10; Asts: Collins 3		Pts: Petrović 17; Rebs: Page 12; Asts: M. Dabović 6

Arena Savaria, Szombathely
Attendance: 300
Referees: Janusz Calik (POL), Ilona Kučerová (CZE), Mila Cavara (BIH)

=== Russia vs Latvia ===
14 June 2015
19:00

Boxscore

Russia	62–68	Latvia
Scoring by quarter: 15–22, 16–14, 17–11, 14–21
Pts: Prince 16; Rebs: Osipova 11; Asts: Prince 6		Pts: Jēkabsone 20; Rebs: Šteinberga 8 Asts: Šteinberga 3

Arena Savaria, Szombathely
Attendance: 300
Referees: Manuel Mazzoni (ITA), Özlem Yalman (TUR), Sonia Teixeira (POR)

== 15 June ==
=== Croatia vs Great Britain ===
15 June 2015
16:30

Boxscore

Croatia	76–70	Great Britain
Scoring by quarter: 25–12, 20–24, 17–22, 14–12
Pts: Borović 23; Rebs: Slišković 7 Asts: Ciglar 7		Pts: Vanderwal 20; Rebs: Fagbenle 10; Asts: Vanderwal 4

Arena Savaria, Szombathely
Attendance: 250
Referees: Manuel Mazzoni (ITA), Janusz Calik (POL), Sonia Teixeira (POR)

=== Serbia vs Russia ===
15 June 2015
19:00

Boxscore

Serbia	53–77	Russia
Scoring by quarter: 17–18, 7–23, 16–19, 13–17
Pts: A. Dabović 15; Rebs: Page 9 Asts: A. Dabović 3		Pts: Belyakova 19; Rebs: Vieru 16; Asts: Osipova 13

Arena Savaria, Szombathely
Attendance: 300
Referees: Fabiana Martinescu (ROU), Ilona Kučerová (CZE), Mila Cavara (BIH)
