= EuroBasket Women 2015 Group F =

Group F of the EuroBasket Women 2015 took place between 18 and 22 June 2015. The group played all of its games at Audi Aréna in Győr, Hungary.

The four best ranked teams advanced to the final round. The points against teams from the same preliminary round were taken over.

== Qualified teams ==
| Group | Winners | Runners-up | Third place |
|---|---|---|---|
| C | Russia | Serbia | Croatia |
| D | Spain | Slovakia | Lithuania |

== Standings ==
| Pos | Team | Pld | W | L | PF | PA | PD | Pts | Qualification |
|---|---|---|---|---|---|---|---|---|---|
| 1 | Spain | 5 | 5 | 0 | 406 | 328 | +78 | 10 | Advance to final round |
| 2 | Lithuania | 5 | 3 | 2 | 371 | 367 | +4 | 8 (Note: Lithuania–Russia 78–74) | Advance to final round |
| 3 | Russia | 5 | 3 | 2 | 366 | 320 | +46 | 8 | Advance to final round |
| 4 | Serbia | 5 | 2 | 3 | 370 | 387 | −17 | 7 (Note: Slovakia–Serbia 74–76) | Advance to final round |
| 5 | Slovakia | 5 | 2 | 3 | 385 | 374 | +11 | 7 | |
| 6 | Croatia | 5 | 0 | 5 | 312 | 434 | −122 | 5 | |

Source: eurobasketwomen2015.com
Notes:

All times are local (UTC+2).

== 18 June ==
=== Slovakia vs Serbia ===
18 June 2015
15:30

Boxscore

| Slovakia | 74–76 | Serbia |
Scoring by quarter: 23–21, 19–19, 13–14, 19–22
| Pts: Toliver 23; Rebs: Jurčenková 9 Asts: Bálintová 5 | | Pts: Petrović 15; Rebs: Page 8 Asts: A. Dabović 5 |

Audi Aréna, Győr
Attendance: 200
Referees: Joseph Bissang (FRA), Manuel Mazzoni (ITA), Andrei Sharapa (BLR)

=== Lithuania vs Russia ===
18 June 2015
18:00

Boxscore

| Lithuania | 78–74 | Russia |
Scoring by quarter: 13–22, 10–17, 24–22, 31–13
| Pts: Petronytė 20; Rebs: Petronytė 8 Asts: Okockytė 5 | | Pts: three players 12; Rebs: Vieru 8 Asts: Osipova 6 |

Audi Aréna, Győr
Attendance: 150
Referees: Fabiana Martinescu (ROU), Ognjen Jokić (MNE), Mila Cavara (BIH)

=== Croatia vs Spain ===
17 June 2015
20:30

Boxscore

| Croatia | 52–95 | Spain |
Scoring by quarter: 13–24, 11–20, 10–18, 18–33
| Pts: Slišković 11; Rebs: Begić 7 Asts: Ciglar 6 | | Pts: Torrens, Xargay 16; Rebs: Ndour 11; Asts: Palau 8 |

Audi Aréna, Győr
Attendance: 200
Referees: Karen Lasuik (CAN), Janusz Calik (POL), Sergii Tyslenko (UKR)

== 20 June ==
=== Lithuania vs Croatia ===
20 June 2015
15:30

Boxscore

| Lithuania | 83–64 | Croatia |
Scoring by quarter: 30–12, 18–16, 17–19, 18–17
| Pts: Petronytė 18; Rebs: Linkevičienė 10; Asts: Nacickaitė 6 | | Pts: Slišković 17; Rebs: Džankić 8 Asts: Ciglar 6 |

Audi Aréna, Győr
Attendance: 200
Referees: Fabiana Martinescu (ROU), Ilona Kučerová (CZE), Sergii Tyslenko (UKR)

=== Russia vs Slovakia ===
20 June 2015
18:00

Boxscore

| Russia | 75–61 | Slovakia |
Scoring by quarter: 23–23, 18–13, 23–12, 11–13
| Pts: Vadeeva 22; Rebs: Osipova 9 Asts: Osipova 7 | | Pts: Bálintová, Hruscáková 15; Rebs: Bálintová 5 Asts: Toliver, Zirková 5 |

Audi Aréna, Győr
Attendance: 500
Referees: Joseph Bissang (FRA), Janusz Calik (POL), Ognjen Jokić (MNE)

=== Serbia vs Spain ===
20 June 2015
20:30

Boxscore

| Serbia | 80–91 | Spain |
Scoring by quarter: 27–24, 13–22, 22–15, 18–30
| Pts: Petrović 17; Rebs: Petrović 8 Asts: A. Dabović 3 | | Pts: Torrens 25; Rebs: Ndour 12; Asts: Palau, Torrens 5 |

Audi Aréna, Győr
Attendance: 500
Referees: Karen Lasuik (CAN), Manuel Mazzoni (ITA), Andrei Sharapa (BLR)

== 22 June ==
=== Slovakia vs Croatia ===
22 June 2015
15:30

Boxscore

| Slovakia | 84–62 | Croatia |
Scoring by quarter: 26–16, 21–9, 18–24, 19–13
| Pts: Bálintová 29; Rebs: Jurčenková 14; Asts: Toliver 7 | | Pts: Slišković 15; Rebs: Slišković 9 Asts: Miloglav 11 |

Audi Aréna, Győr
Attendance: 250
Referees: Ognjen Jokić (MNE), Andrei Sharapa (BLR), Mila Cavara (BIH)

=== Spain vs Russia ===
22 June 2015
18:00

Boxscore

| Spain | 64–57 | Russia |
Scoring by quarter: 17–9, 21–12, 14–16, 12–20
| Pts: Torrens 24; Rebs: Nicholls 13; Asts: Torrens 5 | | Pts: Vadeeva 15; Rebs: three players 6 Asts: Namok 7 |

Audi Aréna, Győr
Attendance: 200
Referees: Fabiana Martinescu (ROU), Joseph Bissang (FRA), Janusz Calik (POL)

=== Serbia vs Lithuania ===
22 June 2015
20:30

Boxscore

| Serbia | 72–73 | Lithuania |
Scoring by quarter: 32–17, 8–20, 14–15, 18–21
| Pts: Milovanović 14; Rebs: Petrović 10; Asts: A. Dabović 6 | | Pts: Nacickaitė 21; Rebs: Petronytė 9 Asts: Okockytė 9 |

Audi Aréna, Győr
Attendance: 250
Referees: Karen Lasuik (CAN), Manuel Mazzoni (ITA), Ilona Kučerová (CZE)
