= EuroBasket Women 2015 Group D =

Group D of the EuroBasket Women 2015 took place between 11 and 15 June 2015. The group played all of its games at MKB Aréna Sopron in Sopron, Hungary.

The group composed of Hungary, Lithuania, Slovakia, Spain and Sweden. The three best ranked teams advanced to the second round.

== Standings ==
Pos	Team	Pld	W	L	PF	PA	PD	Pts	Qualification
1	Spain	4	4	0	287	245	+42	8	Advance to second round
2	Slovakia	4	2	2	312	316	−4	6 (Note: Slovakia–Lithuania 85–79)	Advance to second round
3	Lithuania	4	2	2	279	291	−12	6	Advance to second round
4	Sweden	4	1	3	269	269	0	5 (Note: Sweden–Hungary 73–62)	
5	Hungary	4	1	3	261	287	−26	5	

Source: eurobasketwomen2015.com
Notes:

All times are local (UTC+2).

== 11 June ==
=== Sweden vs Slovakia ===
11 June 2015
16:30

Boxscore

Sweden	69–72	Slovakia
Scoring by quarter: 22–16, 18–14, 13–23, 16–19
Pts: Halvarsson 19; Rebs: F. Eldebrink, Halvarsson 7 Asts: F. Eldebrink, E. Eldebrink 3		Pts: Žirková 26; Rebs: Žirková 6 Asts: Toliver 6

MKB Aréna Sopron, Sopron
Attendance: 800
Referees: Karen Lasuik (CAN), Ognjen Jokić (MNE), Sergii Tyslenko (UKR)

=== Lithuania vs Spain ===
11 June 2015
19:00

Boxscore

Lithuania	58–72	Spain
Scoring by quarter: 5–13, 10–15, 20–21, 23–23
Pts: Petronytė 9 Rebs: Nacickaitė, Petronytė 7 Asts: three players 2		Pts: Ndour 22; Rebs: Ndour 12; Asts: Torrens 6

MKB Aréna Sopron, Sopron
Attendance: 750
Referees: Joseph Bissang (FRA), Maka Kupatadze (GEO), Andrei Sharapa (BLR)

== 12 June ==
=== Slovakia vs Lithuania ===
12 June 2015
16:30

Boxscore

Slovakia	85–79	Lithuania
Scoring by quarter: 24–23, 21–12, 17–30, 23–14
Pts: Toliver 23; Rebs: Hruscáková 8 Asts: Toliver 6		Pts: Nacickaitė 22; Rebs: Linkevičienė 11; Asts: three players 4

MKB Aréna Sopron, Sopron
Attendance: 850
Referees: Ognjen Jokić (MNE), Maka Kupatadze (GEO), Anastasios Manos (GRE)

=== Hungary vs Sweden ===
12 June 2015
19:00

Boxscore

Hungary	63–72	Sweden
Scoring by quarter: 20–12, 19–15, 12–19, 12–26
Pts: D. Horti, Quigley 14; Rebs: Vajda 7 Asts: Honti 5		Pts: F. Eldebrink 28; Rebs: Key 7 Asts: E. Eldebrink 4

MKB Aréna Sopron, Sopron
Attendance: 2,200
Referees: Joseph Bissang (FRA), Karen Lasuik (CAN), Andrei Sharapa (BLR)

== 13 June ==
=== Spain vs Slovakia ===
13 June 2015
16:30

Boxscore

Spain	82–81	Slovakia
Scoring by quarter: 14–20, 20–19, 24–18, 24–24
Pts: Torrens 20; Rebs: Gil, Torrens 5 Asts: Palau 7		Pts: Toliver 22; Rebs: Hruscáková 8 Asts: Jurčenková 4

MKB Aréna Sopron, Sopron
Attendance: 1,100
Referees: Joseph Bissang (FRA), Andrei Sharapa (BLR), Anastasios Manos (GRE)

=== Lithuania vs Hungary ===
13 June 2015
19:00

Boxscore

Lithuania	72–66	Hungary
Scoring by quarter: 15–15, 24–8, 13–24, 20–19
Pts: Petronytė 28; Rebs: Petronytė 12; Asts: Solopova 5		Pts: Quigley 20; Rebs: Honti 6 Asts: Fegyverneky 4

MKB Aréna Sopron, Sopron
Attendance: 2,100
Referees: Ognjen Jokić (MNE), Karen Lasuik (CAN), Sergii Tyslenko (UKR)

== 14 June ==
=== Sweden vs Lithuania ===
14 June 2015
16:30

Boxscore

Sweden	68–70	Lithuania
Scoring by quarter: 17–15, 12–18, 22–28, 17–9
Pts: Halvarsson 18; Rebs: Halvarsson 11; Asts: F. Eldebrink 7		Pts: Okockytė 19; Rebs: Linkevičienė 9 Asts: Linkevičienė, Petronytė 4

MKB Aréna Sopron, Sopron
Attendance: 900
Referees: Joseph Bissang (FRA), Karen Lasuik (CAN), Sergii Tyslenko (UKR)

=== Hungary vs Spain ===
14 June 2015
19:00

Boxscore

Hungary	46–69	Spain
Scoring by quarter: 13–21, 13–13, 15–10, 5–25
Pts: Honti 10; Rebs: Vajda 6 Asts: Quigley, Vajda 4		Pts: Torrens 18; Rebs: Torrens 14; Asts: Xargay 6

MKB Aréna Sopron, Sopron
Attendance: 1,300
Referees: Ognjen Jokić (MNE), Maka Kupatadze (GEO), Anastasios Manos (GRE)

== 15 June ==
=== Spain vs Sweden ===
15 June 2015
16:30

Boxscore

Spain	64–60	Sweden
Scoring by quarter: 25–16, 14–13, 11–9, 14–22
Pts: Cruz 13; Rebs: Ndour 10; Asts: Domínguez 2		Pts: F. Eldebrink 12; Rebs: Hamilton 12; Asts: E. Eldebrink 5

MKB Aréna Sopron, Sopron
Attendance: 600
Referees: Andrei Sharapa (BLR), Ognjen Jokić (MNE), Maka Kupatadze (GEO)

=== Slovakia vs Hungary ===
15 June 2015
19:00

Boxscore

Slovakia	74–86	Hungary
Scoring by quarter: 13–24, 14–23, 22–23, 25–16
Pts: Toliver 22; Rebs: Kissová 6 Asts: Žirková 3		Pts: Quigley 26; Rebs: Krivačević 9 Asts: Honti 11

MKB Aréna Sopron, Sopron
Attendance: 1,300
Referees: Joseph Bissang (FRA), Anastasios Manos (GRE), Sergii Tyslenko (UKR)
