= Özlem Yalman =

Turkish basketball referee (born 1977)

- Born: 30 April 1977 (age 49); Adana, Turkey
- Education: Physical education and Sports
- Alma mater: Ege University
- Basketball career
- Position: Turkish Basketball Super League, Turkish Women's Basketball League referee
- Officiating career: 1995–present

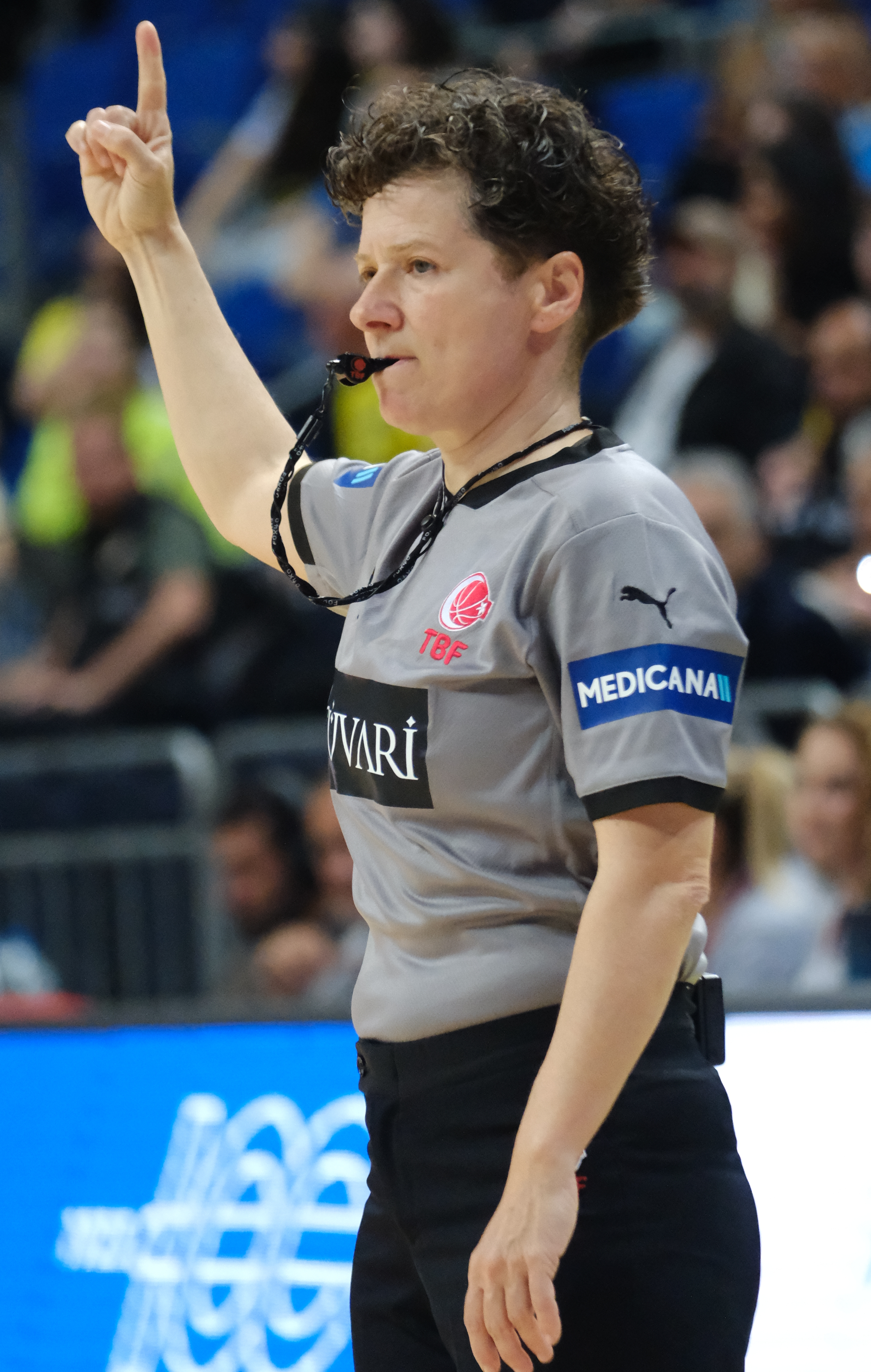

Özlem Yalman (born 30 April 1977) is a Turkish pro basketball referee, a former basketball player, and a school teacher for physical education.

== Early years ==
Özlem was born in Adana, Turkey in 1977. She studied Physical Education and Sports at Ege University in İzmir. After graduation, she was appointed teacher for physical education in a school at Antalya, in which she serves as the only instructor for her branch.

== Sports career ==
Yalman played basketball during her university years, and in Karşıyaka Basket in the Turkish Women's Basketball Second League.

In 1995, she obtained a referee license, and in 2004 she was promoted to A-class official status. Currently, she officiates basketball matches of the Turkish Basketball Super League and Turkish Women's Basketball League.

After successfully completing the FIBA referee candidate program in Bologna, Italy in 2010 and passing the subsequent exam in Gaziantep, Turkey, she became a FIBA-listed referee. Since 2011, she has been tasked to officiate several basketball competitions at world and European level.

== International participations ==
2011

- 2011 FIBA Europe Under-18 Championship for Women – August 4–14, Italy

2013

- EuroBasket Women 2013 – June 5–30, France.
- EuroBasket Women 2015 qualification – June 7–25, Israel
- 2013 FIBA Europe Under-20 Championship for Women – July 4–14, Turkey
- 2013 FIBA Under-19 World Championship for Women – July 18–28, Lithuania

2014

- 2013–14 EuroCup Women Final – March 20, Russia.
- 2014 FIBA World Championship for Women – September 27 – October 5, Turkey.

2015

- EuroBasket Women 2015 Group C – June 11–15, Hungary
- 2015 FIBA Europe Under-20 Championship for Women – July 2–12, Spain.
- 2015 FIBA Europe Under-16 Championship for Women – August 13–23, Portugal

2016

- 2015–16 EuroCup Women Final – April 13, France.

2017 FIBA Women's EuroBasket 2017 Final June 25, Prague

2019

- EuroLeague Women Final Four 12–14 April Semi Final & Final
- FIBA Women's EuroBasket 2019 Final – July 7, Serbia

== See also ==
- Turkish women in sports
