= Zane Eglīte =

Latvian basketball player

Zane Eglīte (born December 10, 1984, in Jūrmala) is a Latvian women's basketball player with the Latvia women's national basketball team. She competed with the team at the 2008 Summer Olympics, where she scored 17 points in 5 games.
