= Artemis Spanou =

Greek basketball player

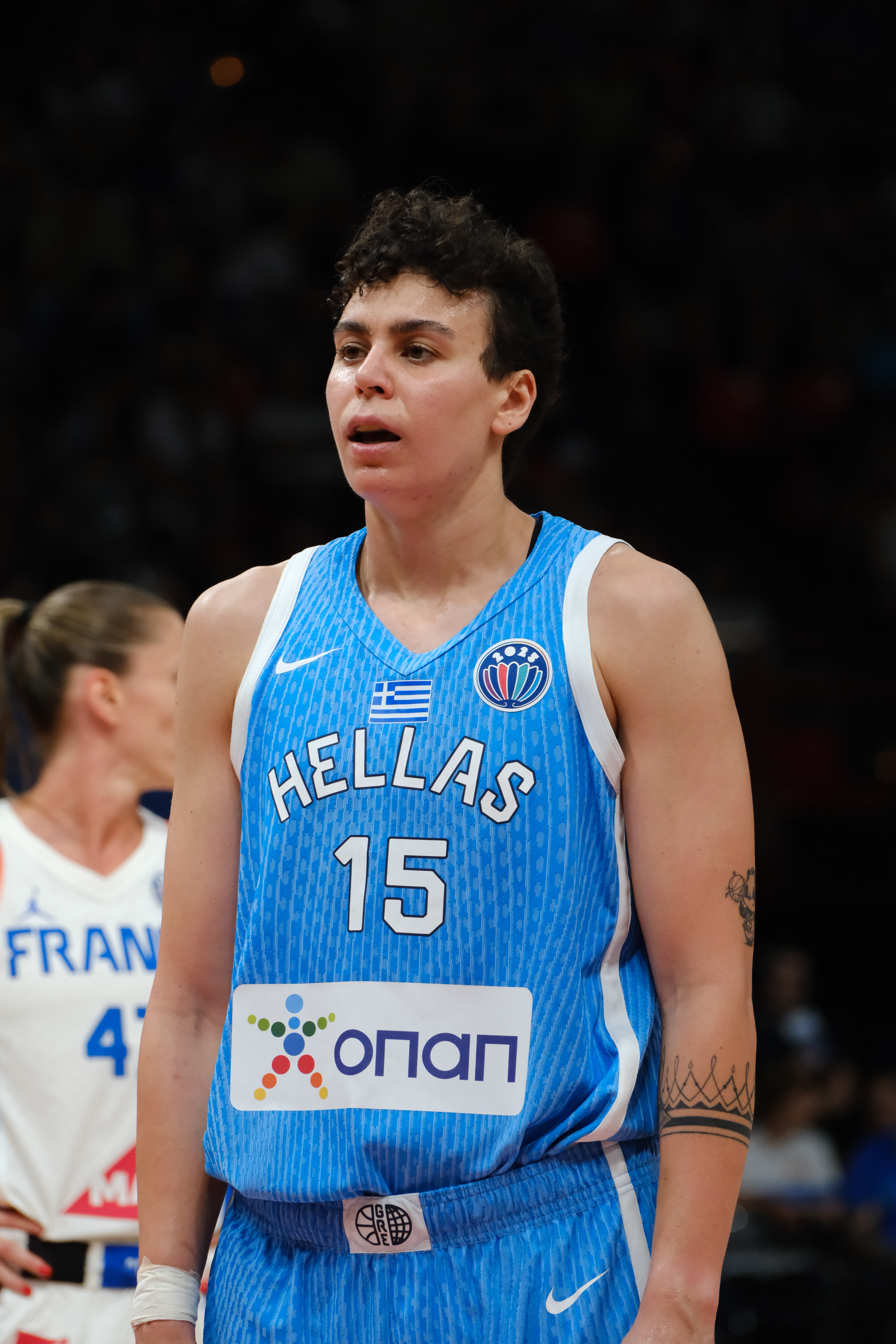
- Artemis Spanou

No. 15 – Crvena zvezda
- Position: Power forward
- League: Basketball League of Serbia; EuroLeague Women

Personal information
- Born: 1 January 1993 (age 33) Rhodos, Greece
- Listed height: 6 ft 1 in (1.85 m)
- Listed weight: 179 lb (81 kg)

Career information
- College: Robert Morris (2010–14)
- WNBA draft: 2015: undrafted
- Playing career: 2007–present

Career history
- 2007–2010: Panionios
- 2014–2015: Istanbul Univ.
- 2015–2017: Uni Girona
- 2017–2018: Polkowice
- 2018–2019: UNI Győr
- 2019–2020: Polkowice
- 2020–2021: GTK Gdynia
- 2021–2023: Polkowice
- 2023–2025: Bourges
- 2025: Brno
- 2025–2026: Panathinaikos
- 2026–present: Crvena zvezda

Career highlights
- NCAA season rebounding leader (2013)

Artemis Spanou (born 1 January 1993) is a Greek American basketball player for the Serbian women's basketball team Crvena zvezda and the Greek national team.

She participated for Greece at EuroBasket Women in 2017, 2021, and 2023.

== Statistics ==
Legend
GP	Games played	GS	Games started	MPG	Minutes per game	FG%	Field goal percentage	3P%	3-point field goal percentage
FT%	Free throw percentage	RPG	Rebounds per game	APG	Assists per game	SPG	Steals per game	BPG	Blocks per game
TO	Turnovers per game	PPG	Points per game	**Bold**	Career high	*	Led Division I

Ratios
Year	Team	GP	FG%	3P%	FT%	RBG	APG	BPG	SPG	PPG
2010-11	Robert Morris	30	38.6%	34.5%	72.3%	9.567	3.033	**1.133**	1.100	13.067
2011-12	Robert Morris	32	42.4%	31.4%	71.2%	10.781	2.219	0.875	1.594	16.844
2012-13	Robert Morris	29	38.5%	23.0%	73.3%	***15.552**	2.552	0.586	**1.966**	19.069
2013-14	Robert Morris	**33**	**51.9%**	**35.4%**	**74.0%**	14.545	**4.061**	1.061	1.242	**19.394**
Career		124	42.8%	30.4%	72.9%	12.605	2.984	0.919	1.468	17.129

Totals
Year	Team	GP	FG	FGA	3P	3PA	FT	FTA	REB	A	BK	ST	PTS
2010-11	Robert Morris	30	147	381	38	110	60	83	287	91	34	33	392
2011-12	Robert Morris	32	182	429	**44**	**140**	131	184	345	71	28	51	539
2012-13	Robert Morris	29	191	**496**	28	122	143	195	451	74	17	**57**	553
2013-14	Robert Morris	**33**	**223**	430	23	65	**171**	**231**	**480**	**134**	**35**	41	**640**
Career		124	743	1736	133	437	505	693	1563	370	114	182	2124
