= Arena Antonio Alexe =

Indoor arena in Oradea, Romania

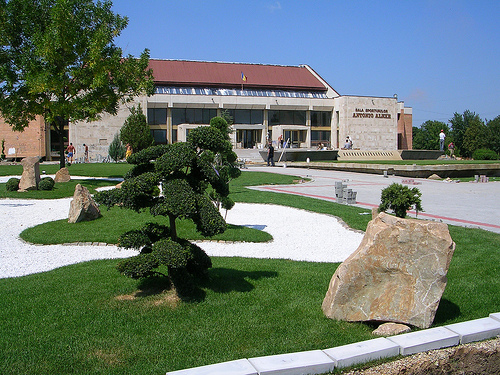
- View of venue (c.2008)
- Interactive map of Arena Antonio Alexe
- Full name: Sala Sporturilor Antonio Alexe
- Former names: Sala Sporturilor
- Location: Oradea, Romania
- Coordinates: 47°03′59.5″N 21°54′32.9″E
- Owner: DJST Bihor
- Operator: CSM Oradea
- Capacity: 2,500 (basketball / handball)
- Surface: Maple wood

Construction
- Groundbreaking: 1975
- Built: 1975–1979
- Opened: 17 November 1979
- Renovated: 2005; 2009–2010; 2011–2012
- Expanded: 2005

Tenants
- CSM Oradea (B); CSM Oradea (H)

Arena Antonio Alexe is an indoor arena located in Oradea, Romania. The arena is named after the Romanian basketball player Antonio Alexe. It is the home arena of the men's professional basketball and handball clubs of CSM Oradea. Arena hosted B group of EuroBasket Women 2015.
