= Paoline Salagnac =

French basketball player

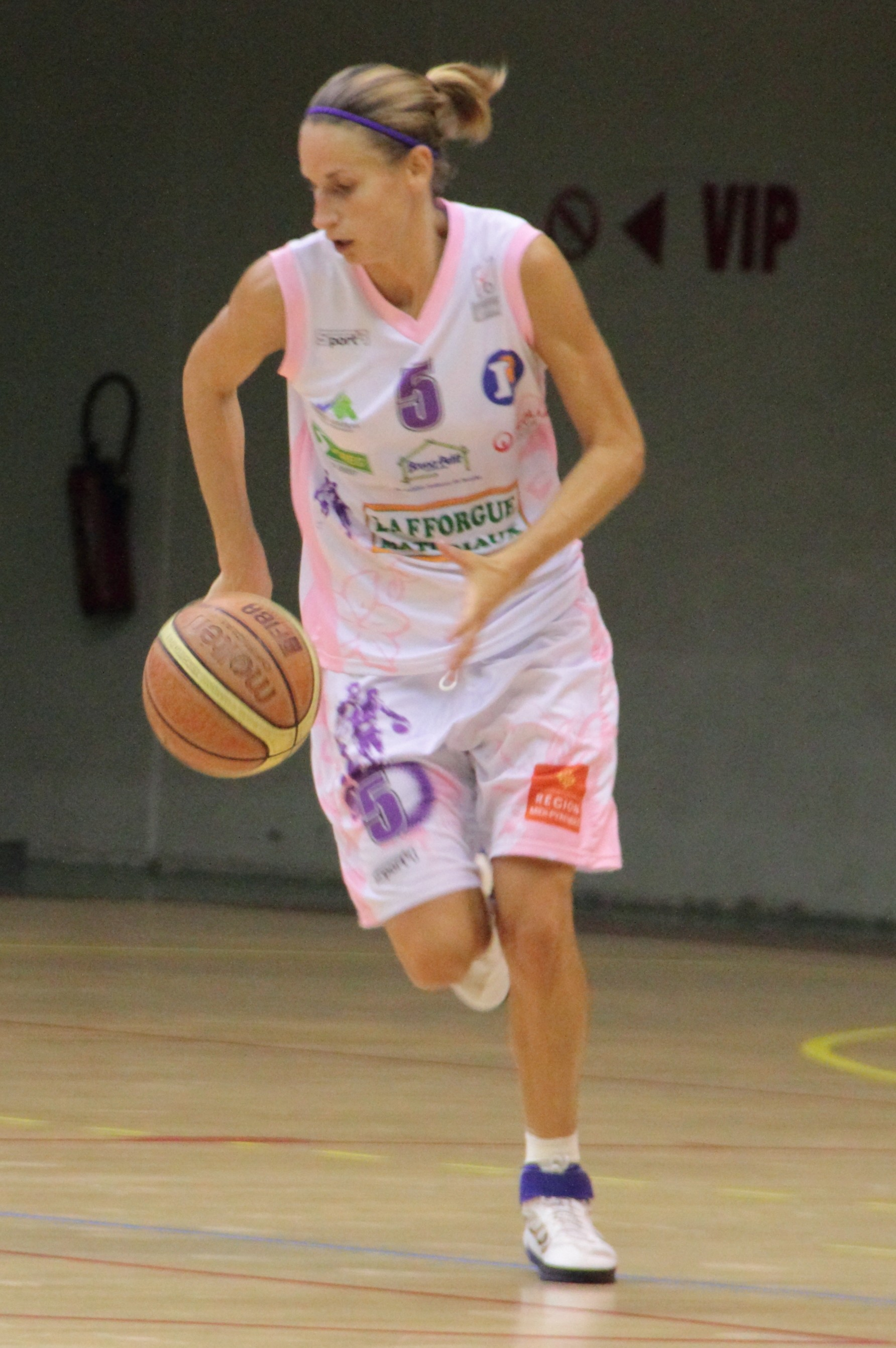

CJM Bourges Basket
- Position: Guard
- League: LFB

Personal information
- Born: March 13, 1984 (age 42)
- Listed height: 5 ft 9 in (1.75 m)

Paoline Salagnac (born 13 March 1984) is a French basketball player for CJM Bourges Basket and the French national team, where she participated at the 2014 FIBA World Championship.
