= Danielle Page =

American-Serbian basketball player (born 1986)

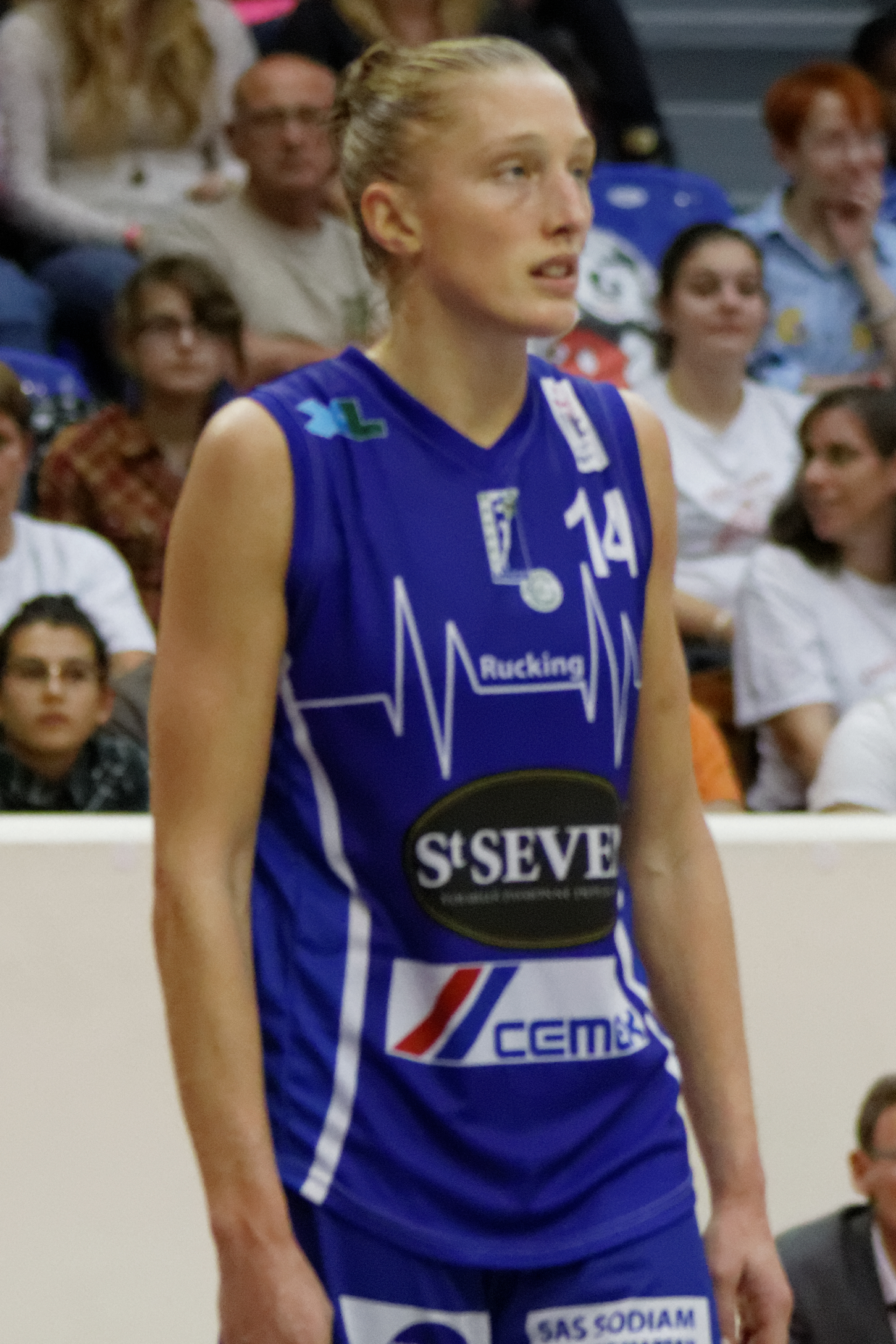
- Danielle Page at Open LFB 2013

Toledo Rockets
- Title: Assistant coach
- League: MAC

Personal information
- Born: November 14, 1986 (age 40) Colorado Springs, Colorado, U.S.
- Listed height: 1.88 m (6 ft 2 in)

Career information
- College: Nebraska (2004–2008)
- WNBA draft: 2008: undrafted
- Playing career: 2008–2018
- Position: Small forward
- Coaching career: 2018–present

Career history

Playing
- 2008: Connecticut Sun
- 2008–2009: Dunav Ruse
- 2009–2010: ASA Jerusalem
- 2010–2011: Zalaegerszeg
- 2011–2012: Challes-les-Eaux Basket
- 2012–2013: Lyon Basket
- 2013–2015: Basket Landes
- 2015–2016: CJM Bourges Basket
- 2016–2018: UNIQA Sopron

Coaching
- 2018–present: Toledo (assistant)
- Stats at Basketball Reference
Medals
Women's basketball
Representing Serbia
Olympic Games
Bronze medal – third place	2016 Rio de Janeiro	Team
EuroBasket
Gold medal – first place	2015 Budapest

Danielle Nicole Page (Serbian Cyrillic: Данијел Никол Пејџ, born November 14, 1986) is an American-Serbian women's basketball coach and former player. Standing at 1.88 m (6 ft 2 in), she played at the small forward position. She also represented the Serbian national basketball team.

== College statistics ==
Legend
GP	Games played	GS	Games started	MPG	Minutes per game
FG%	Field goal percentage	3P%	3-point field goal percentage	FT%	Free throw percentage
RPG	Rebounds per game	APG	Assists per game	SPG	Steals per game
BPG	Blocks per game	PPG	Points per game	**Bold**	Career high

Year	Team	GP	Points	FG%	3P%	FT%	RPG	APG	SPG	BPG	PPG
2004–05	Nebraska	32	191	40.8	-	73.6	4.1	0.3	**0.8**	1.0	6.0
2005–06	Nebraska	32	137	36.8	-	**73.8**	3.6	0.3	0.7	1.2	4.3
2006–07	Nebraska	32	223	**48.0**	-	60.0	5.5	0.8	0.5	1.9	7.0
2007–08	Nebraska	**33**	**395**	43.6	**35.0**	68.5	**6.5**	**1.4**	**0.8**	**2.4**	**12.0**
Career		129	946	43.0	31.8	68.4	4.9	0.7	0.7	1.6	7.3

== Professional career ==
After going undrafted, Page signed with the WNBA's Connecticut Sun and played three games for the team in 2008. She has also played professionally in Bulgaria, Israel, Hungary, and France. In May 2018, she retired from professional basketball.

=== WNBA career statistics ===
==== Regular season ====
Year	Team	GP	GS	MPG	FG%	3P%	FT%	RPG	APG	SPG	BPG	TO	PPG
2008	Connecticut	3	0	4.0	60.0	0.0	0.0	2.0	0.0	0.0	0.0	0.7	2.0
Career	1 year, 1 team	3	0	4.0	60.0	0.0	0.0	2.0	0.0	0.0	0.0	0.7	2.0

== International career ==
In March 2015, Page received her Serbian citizenship in order to represent the Serbian national basketball team in the international competitions. She represented the Serbian national basketball team at the EuroBasket 2015 in Budapest where they won the gold medal, and qualified for the 2016 Olympics, a first in the history of the Serbian team. The team won the bronze medal in Rio.

== Post-career ==
After retiring from professional basketball, Page was hired as an assistant coach for the University of Toledo women's basketball program.

== See also ==
- List of Serbian WNBA players
