= Irina Osipova =

Russian basketball player (born 1981)

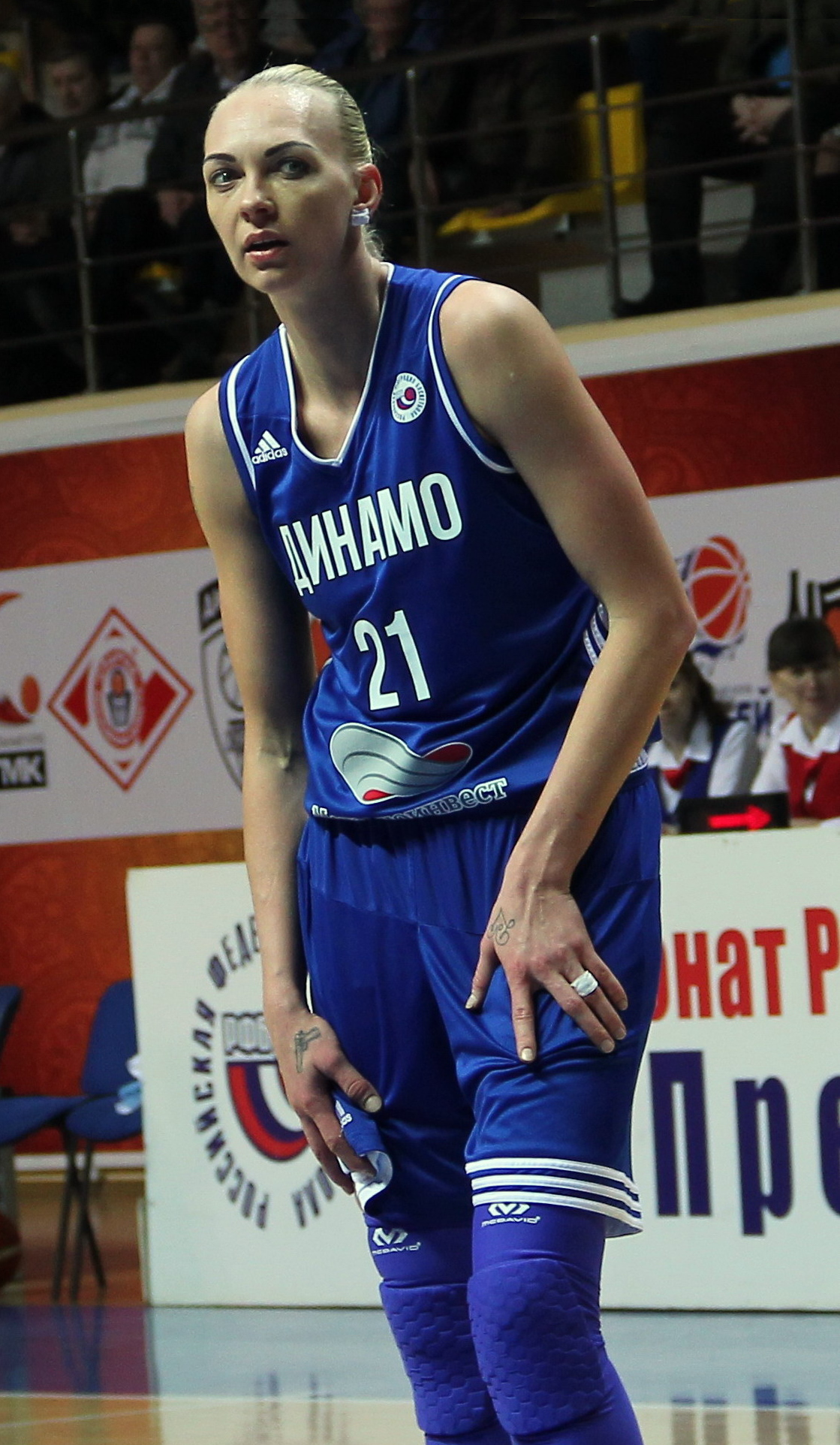
- Osipova in 2016

Personal information
- Born: 25 June 1981 (age 45) Moscow, Russian SFSR, Soviet Union
- Listed height: 196 cm (6 ft 5 in)
- Listed weight: 72 kg (159 lb)

Career information
- Playing career: 1997–2019

Career history
- 2006: Detroit Shock
- Stats at Basketball Reference
Medals
Representing Russia
Olympic Games
Bronze medal – third place	2004 Athens	Team
Bronze medal – third place	2008 Beijing	Team
World Championships
Silver medal – second place	2002 China	Team
Silver medal – second place	2006 Brazil	Team
European Championships
Silver medal – second place	2001 France	Team
Gold medal – first place	2003 Greece	Team
Gold medal – first place	2007 Italy	Team
Silver medal – second place	2009 Latvia	Team
Gold medal – first place	2011 Poland	Team

Irina Viktorovna Osipova (Russian: Ирина Викторовна Осипова, born 25 June 1981) is a Russian basketball player. Since 2002 she was part of the Russia women's national basketball team at most major international competitions. She won Olympic bronze medals in 2004 and 2008, placing fourth in 2012, and collected three gold and five silver medals at the world and European championships. She currently plays for Dynamo Kursk from Russian Women's Basketball Premier League. She is married and has a daughter Alyona.

== Career ==
- 1997–2001 (Russia) Gloria Moscow
- 2001–2002 (Russia) Dynamo Moscow
- 2002–2004 (Russia) UMMC Ekaterinburg
- 2004 (Russia) VBM-SGAU Samara
- 2004–2005 (Israel) Elitzur Ramla
- 2005–2012 (Russia) Spartak Moscow Region
- 2012–2014 (Turkey) İstanbul Üniversitesi
- 2014 (Slovakia) Good Angels Košice
- 2014–2016 (Russia) Dynamo Kursk
- 2017–2019 (Russia) Spartak Moscow Region
- 2006 (United States) Detroit Shock
