= Anna Jurčenková =

Slovak basketball player

No. 12 – Piešťanské Čajky
- Position: Center
- League: SBE

Personal information
- Born: July 26, 1985 (age 41) Prešov, Slovakia
- Listed height: 6 ft 5 in (1.96 m)

Career information
- Playing career: 2001–present

Career history
- 2001–2004: Cassovia Košice
- 2004–2012: Good Angels Košice
- 2012–2014: BK Brno
- 2014–2015: TSV 1880 Wasserburg
- 2015–2018: Good Angels Košice
- 2018–2019: Arka Gdynia
- 2019–2020: Olympiacos
- 2020–2021: Young Angels Košice
- 2021–2022: BK Brno

Anna Jurčenková (born July 26, 1985) is a Slovak female basketball player. She currently plays as a captain for Piešťanské Čajky in Slovakia.
