= Isabelle Yacoubou =

French basketball player (born 1986)

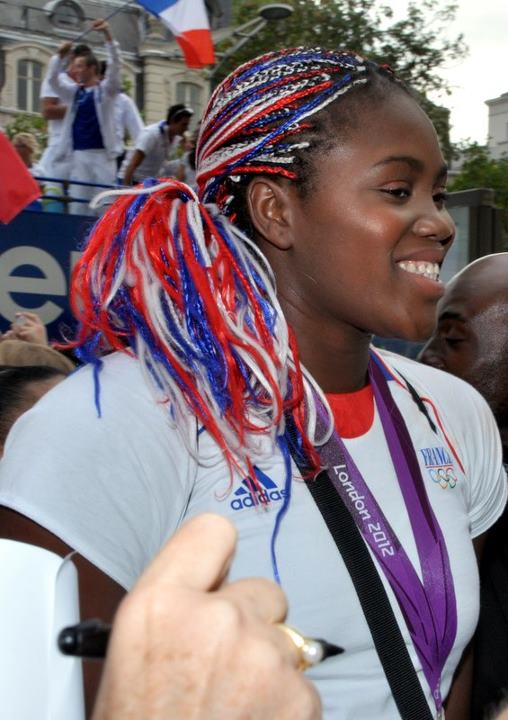
- Yacoubou at the 2012 Olympics

No. 4 – Tarbes Gespe Bigorre
- Position: Center
- League: LFB

Personal information
- Born: 21 April 1986 (age 40) Godomey, Benin
- Listed height: 1.90 m (6 ft 3 in)
- Listed weight: 100 kg (220 lb)

Career information
- WNBA draft: 2012: 3rd round, 32nd overall pick
- Drafted by: Atlanta Dream

Career history
- 2003–2010: Tarbes Gespe Bigorre
- 2010–2011: Famila Schio
- 2012–2013: WBC Sparta&K
- 2013–2014: Fenerbahçe S.K.
- 2014: Heilongjiang Dragons
- 2015–2018: Famila Schio
- 2018–2022: Tango Bourges Basket
- 2022–2024: Tarbes Gespe Bigorre

Career highlights
- EuroLeague Women winner (2012); EuroCup Women winner (2022); 2× French LFB League champion (2010, 2022); 2× French LFB League MVP (2009, 2010); 4× Italian LBF League champion (2011, 2015, 2016, 2018); Italian LBF League MVP (2018); Spanish LFB League champion (2012); 4× Italian Cup winner (2011, 2015, 2017, 2018); Italian Cup MVP (2018)
- Stats at Basketball Reference
Medals
Women's basketball
Representing France
Olympic Games
Silver medal – second place	2012 London	Team
EuroBasket
Gold medal – first place	2009 Latvia
Silver medal – second place	2013 France
Silver medal – second place	2015 Hungary/Romania
Bronze medal – third place	2011 Poland

Odjola Cafouni Auxencia Yacoubou-Dehoui (born 21 April 1986) is a Beninese-born French basketball player. She plays for France women's national basketball team. She has competed in the 2012 Summer Olympics where France won a silver medal. Since May 2004 she also holds the Beninese record in the shot put at 15.15 meters. Returning in 2022 to her training club Tarbes, she was injured in January 2024 during a match against Charleville-Mézières. On 28 February 2024 Tarbes GB announced that Yacoubou was stopping her playing career and joining the club's management.
