= LaToya Sanders =

American-Turkish basketball player (born 1986)

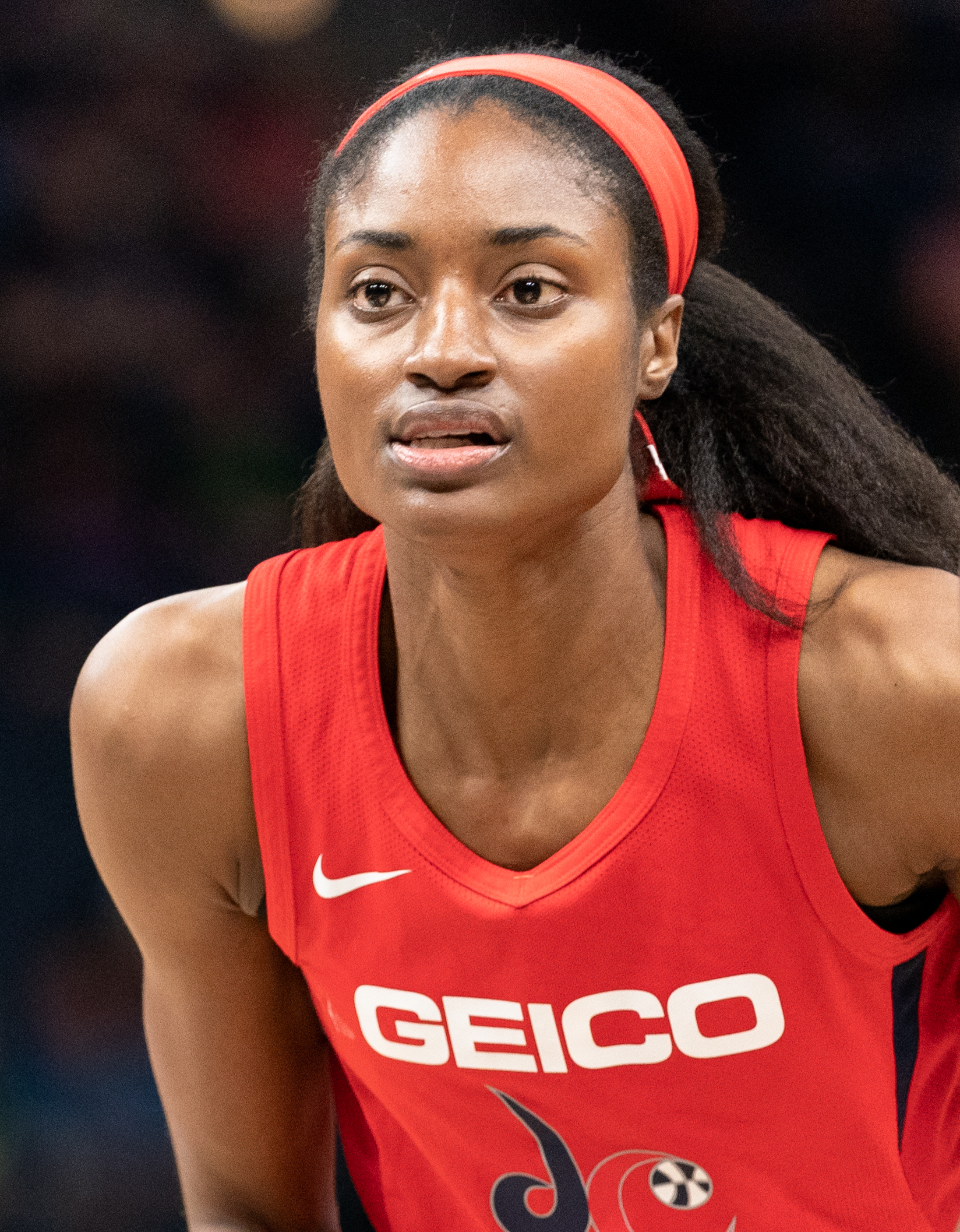
- Sanders in 2019

Atlanta Dream
- Title: Assistant coach
- League: WNBA

Personal information
- Born: September 11, 1986 (age 40) Nuremberg, Germany
- Listed height: 6 ft 3 in (1.91 m)
- Listed weight: 170 lb (77 kg)

Career information
- High school: Seventy-First (Fayetteville, North Carolina)
- College: North Carolina (2004–2008)
- WNBA draft: 2008: 1st round, 13th overall pick
- Drafted by: Phoenix Mercury
- Playing career: 2008–2020
- Position: Forward-center
- Coaching career: 2021–present

Career history

Playing
- 2008: Phoenix Mercury
- 2008–2009: Maccabi Ramat Hen
- 2009: Minnesota Lynx
- 2009–2017: Kayseri Kaski
- 2011: Los Angeles Sparks
- 2015–2019: Washington Mystics
- 2017–2018: UMMC Ekaterinburg
- 2019: Reyer Venezia
- 2020: Çukurova Basketbol

Coaching
- 2021–2024: Washington Mystics (assistant)
- 2025–present: Atlanta Dream (assistant)

Career highlights
- WNBA champion (2019); First-team All-ACC (2008); ACC Defensive Player of the Year (2008); ACC All-Defensive Team (2008)
- Stats at WNBA.com
- Stats at Basketball Reference

LaToya Antoinette Sanders (née Pringle; born September 11, 1986), also known as Lara Sanders in Turkey, is an American-Turkish professional basketball coach and former player. She currently serves as an assistant coach for the Atlanta Dream of the Women's National Basketball Association (WNBA). Sanders played college basketball at the University of North Carolina before getting drafted by the Phoenix Mercury in the 2008 WNBA draft. Sanders played for seven seasons in the WNBA with the Mercury, Minnesota Lynx, Los Angeles Sparks, and Washington Mystics. In 2019, her final season in the league, she won the championship with the Mystics. Sanders also played overseas in Israel, Turkey, Russia, and Italy. In 2012, she received Turkish citizenship and represented the Turkey women's national basketball team, including an appearance at the 2016 Summer Olympics.

After her playing career, Sanders became an assistant coach, and later associate head coach, for the Mystics. In 2025, she was hired as assistant coach for the Atlanta Dream.

== Personal life ==
Sanders was born in Nuremberg, Germany, where her parents were stationed in the Army. The family later moved to Fayetteville, North Carolina. She is the daughter of Reece and Sharon Pringle and has a younger sister named Shanice. Sanders is married to former UNC men's basketball player Byron Sanders.

== High school ==
LaToya attended Seventy-First High School in Fayetteville, North Carolina. Sanders was named North Carolina's Miss Basketball for Class 4-A in her junior and senior years. She also was named first-team all-state both years. Sanders led Seventy-First to state titles in 2003 and 2004, winning tournament MVP honors on both occasions. As a senior, she totalled 25 points, 18 rebounds and seven blocks in the title game. Sanders set a state championship record with 28 rebounds in the 2003 title game. She also averaged 21.5 points, 14.2 rebounds and nine blocks in her senior season.

== College career ==
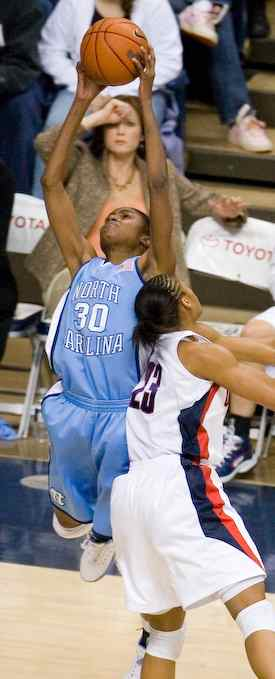
LaToya Sanders for North Carolina in a game against Connecticut.

Sanders attended the University of North Carolina. As a freshman at UNC she averaged 4.6 points, 3.0 rebounds and 1.5 blocks. She played in 30 games and ranked fifth in the ACC with 1.5 blocks per game. In her junior year she had a breakout season in her first year as a starter. She started all 38 games for the Tar Heels, establishing a school record for games started and games played in a season. She was second on the team and fourth in the ACC in field goal percentage (.550) and second in blocks (3.18 per game). Her 3.18 blocks per game were good for fifth in the NCAA. She registered a block in every game and five or more on eight occasions.

=== North Carolina statistics ===
Legend
GP	Games played	GS	Games started	MPG	Minutes per game
FG%	Field goal percentage	3P%	3-point field goal percentage	FT%	Free throw percentage
RPG	Rebounds per game	APG	Assists per game	SPG	Steals per game
BPG	Blocks per game	PPG	Points per game	**Bold**	Career high

Year	Team	GP	Points	FG%	3P%	FT%	RPG	APG	SPG	BPG	PPG
2004-05	North Carolina	30	138	**65.3**	-	66.7	3.0	0.0	0.4	1.5	4.6
2005-06	North Carolina	35	190	58.3	-	74.5	4.4	0.6	1.1	2.1	5.4
2006-07	North Carolina	**38**	370	55.0	-	73.3	**7.5**	0.6	1.2	**3.2**	9.7
2007-08	North Carolina	35	**510**	58.4	**100.0**	**74.9**	7.2	**0.8**	**1.4**	2.7	**14.6**
Career	North Carolina	138	1208	57.9	33.3	73.3	5.7	0.5	1.1	2.4	8.8

== Professional career ==
=== WNBA ===
==== Phoenix Mercury (2008) ====
Sanders was drafted in the first round of the 2008 WNBA draft with the 13th overall pick by the Phoenix Mercury. In her rookie season, she played in 29 games and started 7. She averaged 13 minutes, 4.4 points, and 3.5 rebounds per game.

==== Minnesota Lynx (2009) ====
For the 2009 season, Sanders was traded to the Minnesota Lynx. She played in 17 games for the Lynx and averaged 9.4 minutes, 2.2 points, and 2.2 rebounds per game.

==== Los Angeles Sparks (2011) ====
In February 2010, Sanders signed with the Los Angeles Sparks. However, she was waived in the training camp. She signed with the Sparks for the 2011 season and made the roster, playing in 20 games and averaging 11.1 minutes, 3.9 points, and 2.4 rebounds per game.

==== Washington Mystics (2015–2019) ====
After the 2011 season, Sanders took a leave from the WNBA, continuing to play overseas while preferring to spend at least part of the year with her family. Sanders returned to the WNBA for the 2015 season, signing with the Washington Mystics, who had held her rights since a trade in 2012.

In June 2020, Sanders announced that she would forgo the 2020 WNBA season, played in the Wubble, due to concerns of racism and the coronavirus. On March 8, 2021, Sanders announced her retirement from professional basketball.

=== Overseas ===
Sanders started her overseas career in the 2008–2009 season in Israel with Maccabi Ramat Hen.

From 2009 to 2017, she played for Kayseri Kaski S.K. of the Turkish Super League.

She joined UMMC Ekaterinburg for the 2017–2018 season and won the 2017–18 EuroLeague.

In February 2019, she joined Reyer Venezia.

In January 2020, she joined Çukurova Basketbol.

== National team career ==
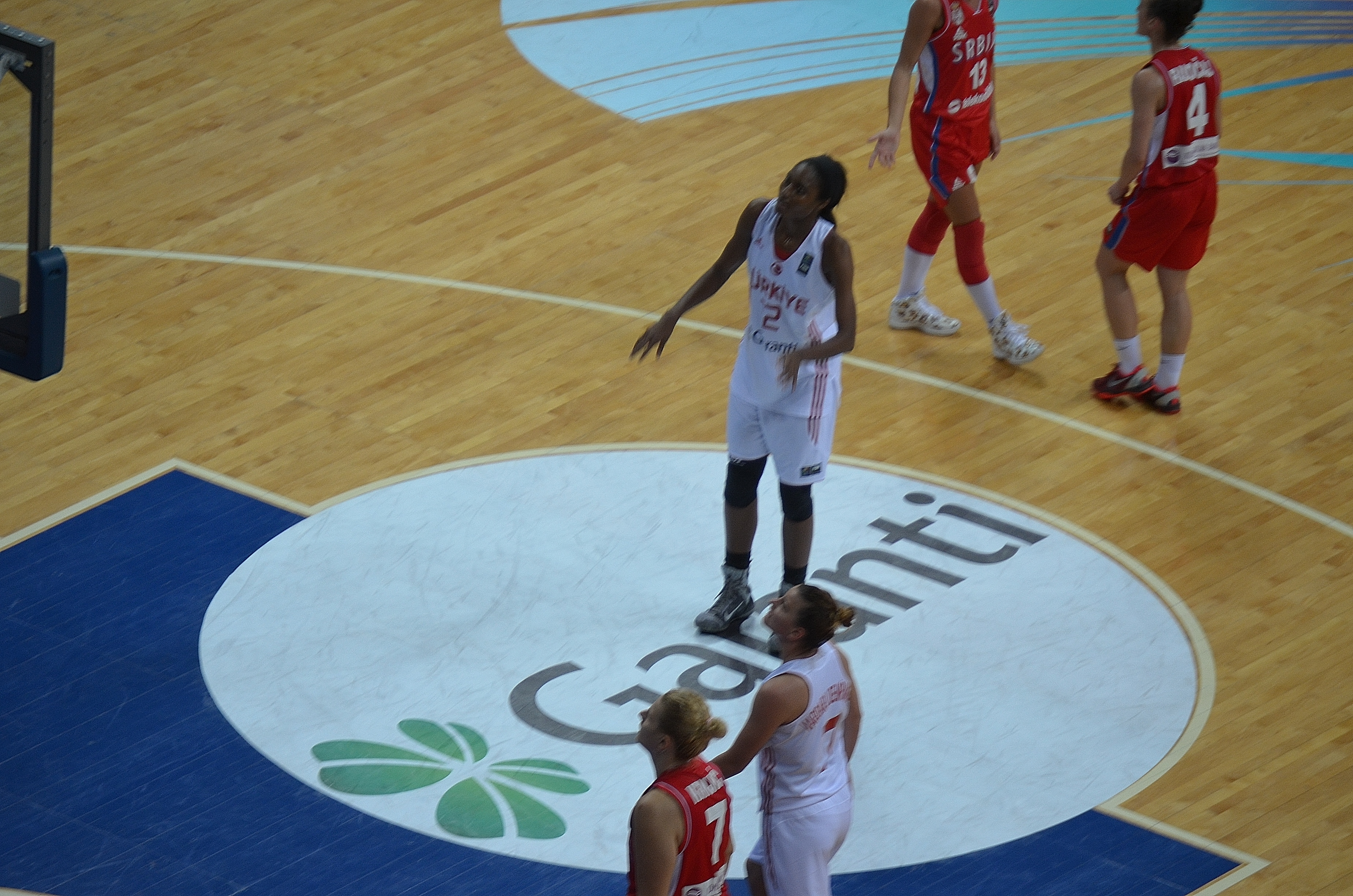
Lara Sanders for Turkey in the 2014 FIBA World Championship for Women quarterfinals match against Serbia.

Sanders obtained Turkish citizenship in 2012, adopting the name Lara Sanders. Becoming eligible for the Turkey women's national basketball team, she represented Turkey in the 2014 FIBA World Championship for Women, EuroBasket Women 2015, and the 2016 Summer Olympics.

== Coaching career ==
In April 2021, soon after her retirement, Sanders was named an assistant coach for the Mystics. After the 2022 season, she was elevated to associate head coach.

On January 6, 2025, Sanders was announced as an assistant coach for the Atlanta Dream.

== WNBA career statistics ==
Legend
GP	Games played	GS	Games started	MPG	Minutes per game	RPG	Rebounds per game
APG	Assists per game	SPG	Steals per game	BPG	Blocks per game	PPG	Points per game
TO	Turnovers per game	FG%	Field-goal percentage	3P%	3-point field-goal percentage	FT%	Free-throw percentage
**Bold**	Career best	°	League leader

†	Denotes seasons in which Sanders won a WNBA championship

=== Regular season ===
Year	Team	GP	GS	MPG	FG%	3P%	FT%	RPG	APG	SPG	BPG	TO	PPG
2008	Phoenix	29	7	13.0	.448	.000	.824	3.5	0.3	0.3	1.5	0.9	4.4
2009	Minnesota	17	0	9.4	.433	.000	.733	2.2	0.5	0.2	0.8	0.8	2.2
2011	Los Angeles	20	0	11.1	.473	**1.000**	.889	2.4	0.3	0.3	0.7	0.6	3.9
2015	Washington	23	0	18.1	.402	.000	.765	5.7	0.9	0.9	2.1	0.8	5.0
2016	Washington	4	0	17.3	.500	.000	.846	3.0	0.3	0.8	**2.5**	0.8	7.3
2018	Washington	28	25	**24.5**	**.607**	.000	.869	**6.4**	1.6	**1.3**	1.1	1.1	**10.2**
2019^{†}	Washington	**34**	**34**	23.6	.506	.000	**.892**	5.5	**1.9**	0.9	1.4	0.9	6.1
Career	7 years, 4 teams	155	66	17.6	.503	.500	.840	4.5	1.0	0.7	1.3	0.9	5.7

=== Playoffs ===
Year	Team	GP	GS	MPG	FG%	3P%	FT%	RPG	APG	SPG	BPG	TO	PPG
2018	Washington	**9**	**9**	**26.4**	**.466**	.000	.789	**5.8**	**2.2**	1.2	**2.6**	0.6	**7.7**
2019^{†}	Washington	**9**	**9**	23.1	.424	.000	**.875**	3.4	1.0	**1.3**	1.4	0.3	6.3
Career	2 years, 1 team	18	18	24.8	.444	.000	.815	4.6	1.6	1.3	2.0	0.4	7.0
