= Céline Dumerc =

French basketball player (born 1982)

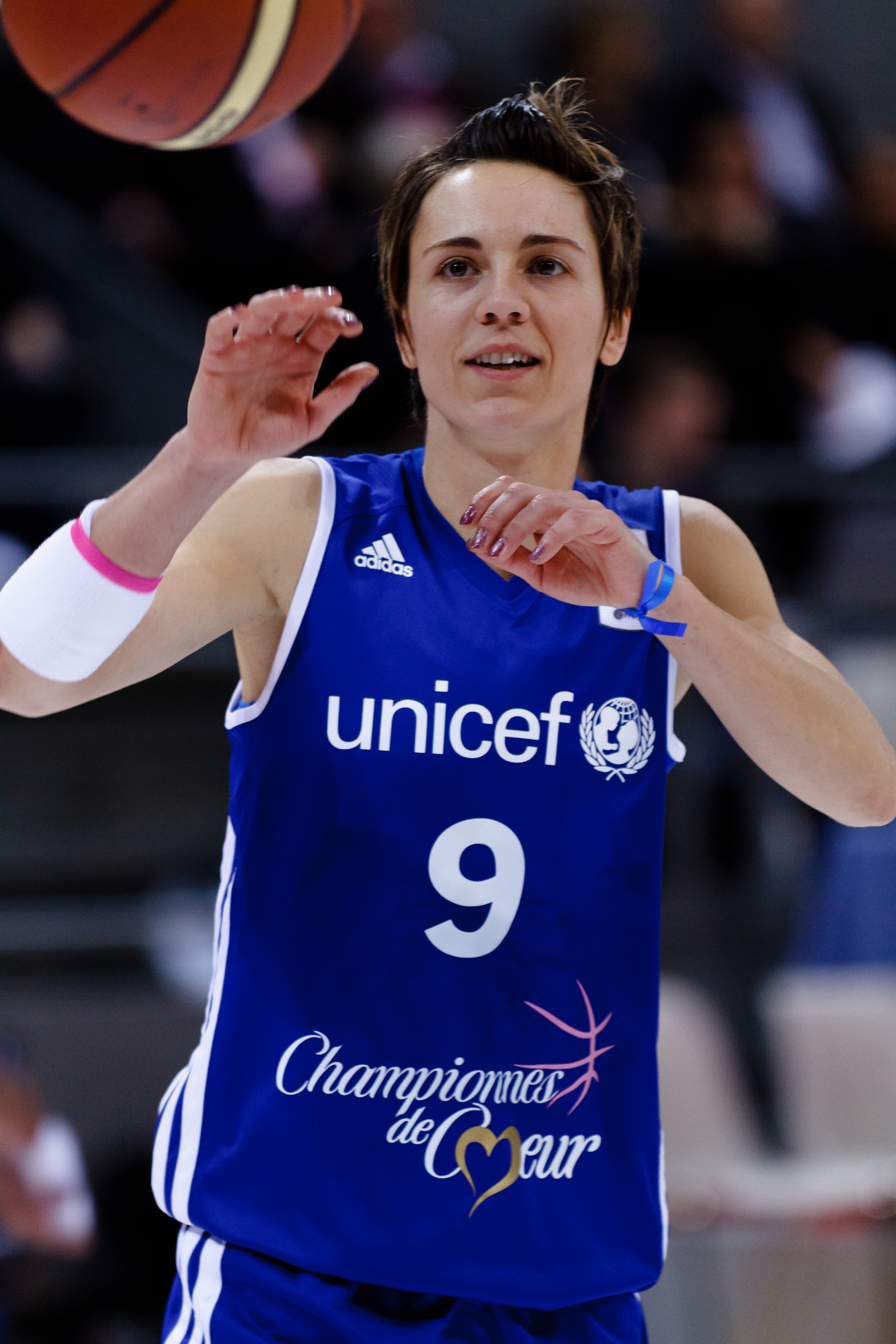
- Dumerc in 2014

Personal information
- Born: 9 July 1982 (age 44) Tarbes, France
- Listed height: 5 ft 7 in (1.70 m)
- Listed weight: 136 lb (62 kg)
- Position: Point guard
- Number: 9

Career history
- 1997–2000: CFBB
- 2000–2003: Tarbes GB
- 2003–2009: Bourges
- 2009–2011: UMMC
- 2011–2016: Bourges
- 2014: Atlanta Dream
- 2016–2023: Basket Landes

Career highlights
- FIBA Europe Women's Player of the Year (2012); French player of the year (2017)
- Stats at Basketball Reference
- FIBA Hall of Fame

Céline Dumerc (born 9 July 1982) is a French former professional basketball player. She was named the FIBA Europe Women's Player of the Year in 2012, and the French player of the year in 2017.

== National team career ==
Dumerc was the captain of the senior women's French national team. She was France's leading scorer at the 2012 London Summer Olympics, where she won the silver medal.

== Awards and accomplishments ==
=== Pro clubs ===
- 5× French Women's Cup Winner: (2005, 2006, 2008, 2009, 2014)
- 3× French Women's Federation Cup Winner: (2006, 2007, 2008)
- 7× French Women's League Champion: (2006, 2008, 2009, 2012, 2013, 2015, 2021)
- Russian Women's Cup Winner: (2010)
- 2× Russian Women's League Champion: (2010, 2011)
- 2× French Women's SuperCup Winner: (2014, 2015)
- EuroCup Women Champion: (2016)

=== French women's national team ===
- 2009 EuroBasket Women: Gold
- 2011 EuroBasket Women: Bronze
- 2012 London Summer Olympics: Silver
- 2013 EuroBasket Women: Silver
- 2015 EuroBasket Women: Silver
- 2017 EuroBasket Women: Silver

=== Individual ===
- 2× French Women's League Best Young Player: (2001, 2002)
- French Women's Federation Cup Best Player: (2007)
- 2× French Women's League Best French Player: (2008, 2014)
- 3× EuroBasket Women All-Tournament Team: (2009, 2013, 2015)
- FIBA Europe Women's Player of the Year: (2012)
- La Gazzetta dello Sport's European Female Player of the Year: (2012)
- French National Order of Merit: (2012)
- Radio France's French Sportsman of the Year (2012)
- Robert Busnel Medal (highest distinction of the French Basketball Federation): (2013)
- French player of the year: (2017)
- French Women's League Best Five Players 1998-2018: (2018)

== Personal life ==
She is openly lesbian and was among the six French LGBT athletes featured in the documentary We Need to Talk.
