= Jelena Škerović =

Montenegrin basketball player and coach

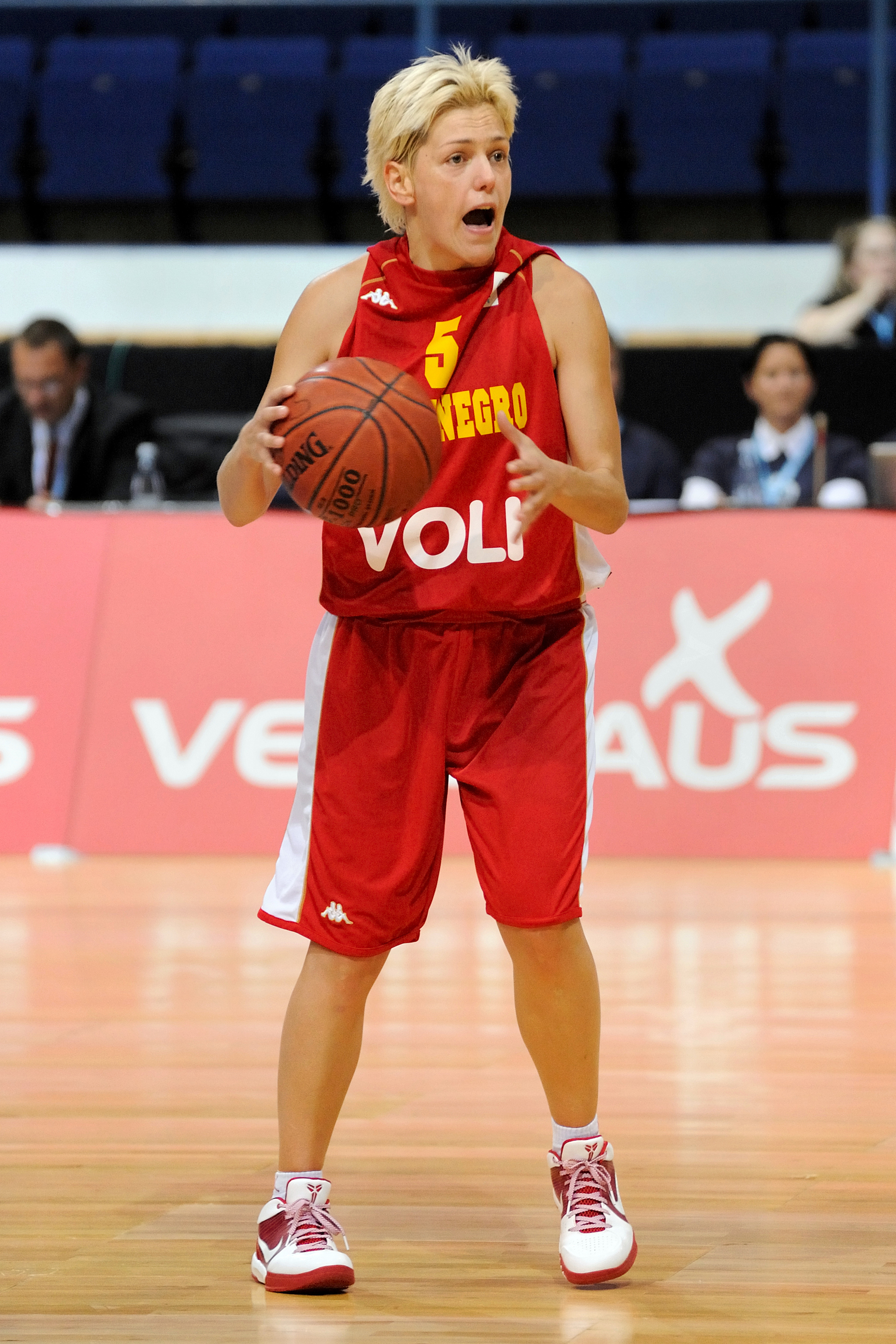
- Škerović with Montenegro in 2010

Personal information
- Born: 23 December 1980 (age 45) Titograd, SFR Yugoslavia
- Listed height: 5 ft 10 in (1.78 m)
- Listed weight: 143 lb (65 kg)

Career information
- WNBA draft: 2002: undrafted
- Playing career: 2001–2018
- Position: Point guard
- Coaching career: 2017–present

Career history

Playing
- 2001–2004: Budućnost Podgorica
- 2004–2009: Wisła Kraków
- 2009–2011: BK Brno
- 2011–2012: Spartak Moscow
- 2012–2013: USK Prague
- 2013: Budućnost Volcano
- 2013–2014: Polkowice
- 2014–2015: As Osmaniye
- 2015–2018: Lotos Gdynia

Coaching
- 2019–2023: Lotos Gdynia
- 2019–present: Montenegro (women's)
- 2024–2025: Herner TC
- 2025–present: Polonia Warsaw

Jelena Škerović (born 23 December 1980) is a Montenegrin female basketball coach and former player. She is currently the head coach of Basket Liga Kobiet team Polonia Warsaw and the Montenegro national team.
