= Angel Robinson (basketball, born 1987) =

American-Montenegrin basketball player (born 1987)

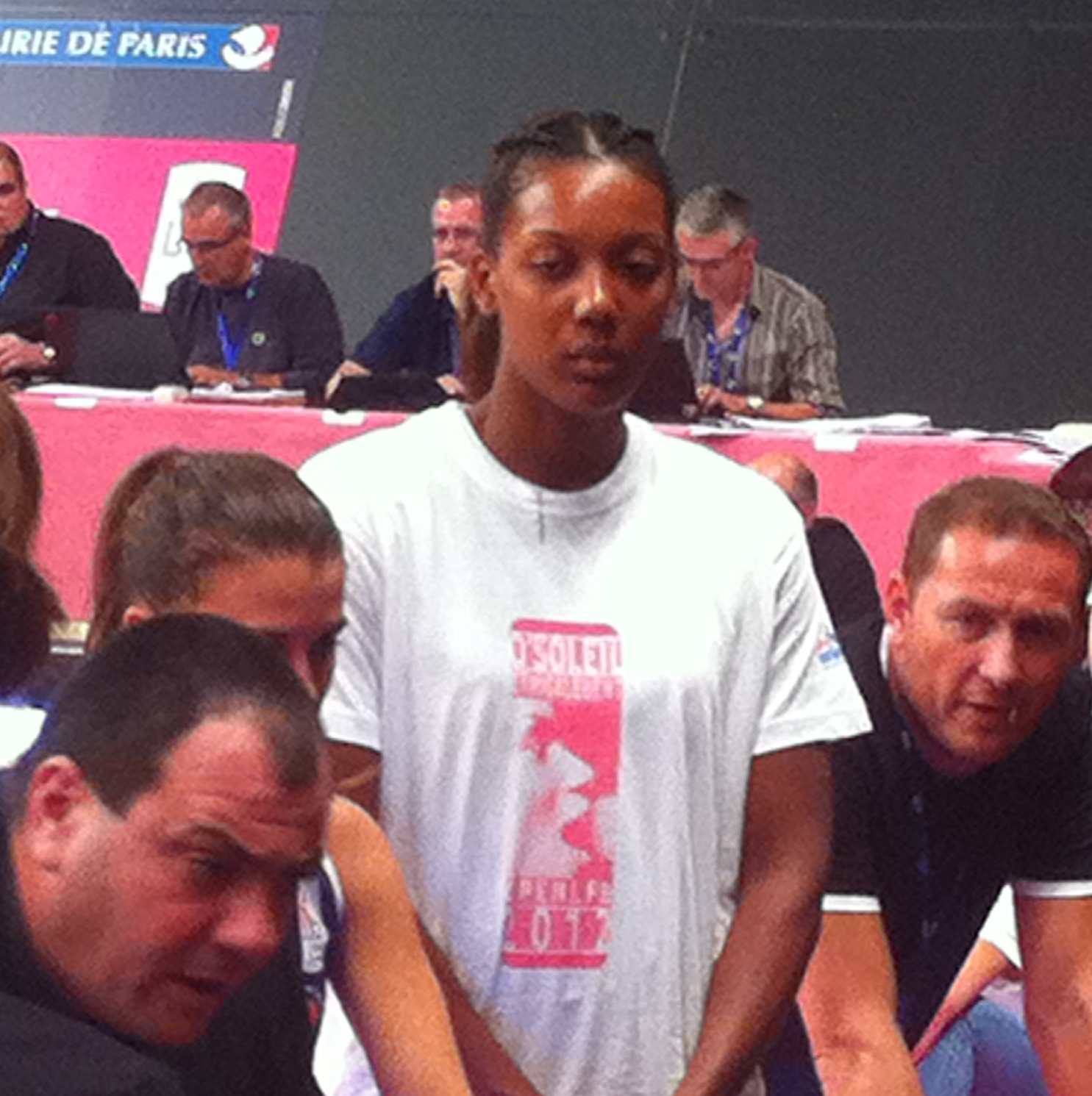

Personal information
- Born: April 20, 1987 (age 39) Chester, South Carolina, U.S.
- Listed height: 6 ft 6 in (1.98 m)
- Listed weight: 193 lb (88 kg)

Career information
- High school: Marietta (Marietta, Georgia)
- College: Georgia (2006–2010)
- WNBA draft: 2010: 2nd round, 20th overall pick
- Drafted by: Los Angeles Sparks
- Playing career: 2010–2020
- Position: Center
- Number: 0

Career history
- 2014: Seattle Storm
- 2017–2018: Phoenix Mercury

Career highlights
- EuroCup Women champion (2017); 3× Copa de la Reina MVP (2014, 2015, 2018); SEC All-Freshman Team (2007); McDonald's All-American (2005); Gatorade Georgia Player of the Year (2005); Miss Georgia Basketball (2005)
- Stats at Basketball Reference
Medals
Women's basketball
Representing United States
FIBA Americas U18 Championship
Gold medal – first place	2004 Mayagüez	{{{2}}}

Angelica Danielle "Angel" Robinson (born April 20, 1987) is an American-Montenegrin former professional basketball player who played in the WNBA and internationally.

The full wikitext markup, including complete biographical sections, career statistics, tables, and categories for Angel Robinson, can be found in the referenced documents.

== Career statistics ==
Legend
GP	Games played	GS	Games started	MPG	Minutes per game	RPG	Rebounds per game
APG	Assists per game	SPG	Steals per game	BPG	Blocks per game	PPG	Points per game
TO	Turnovers per game	FG%	Field-goal percentage	3P%	3-point field-goal percentage	FT%	Free-throw percentage
**Bold**	Career best	°	League leader

=== WNBA ===
==== Regular season ====
Year	Team	GP	GS	MPG	FG%	3P%	FT%	RPG	APG	SPG	BPG	TO	PPG
2014	Seattle	**25**	1	7.2	**57.5**	0.0	80.0	1.4	0.3	**0.2**	0.3	**0.8**	2.2
2015	Did not play (National Team—Montenegro)												
2016	Did not play (did not appear in WNBA—traded to Phoenix Mercury)												
2017	Phoenix	15	**8**	**15.8**	56.8	**100.0**	**100.0**	**3.9**	**0.5**	0.1	**0.7**	1.1	**3.9**
2018	Phoenix	24	0	9.9	45.2	0.0	85.0	3.0	**0.5**	**0.2**	0.3	0.9	2.3
Career	3 years, 2 teams	64	9	10.2	53.2	50.0	86.5	2.6	0.4	0.2	0.4	0.9	2.6

==== Playoffs ====
Year	Team	GP	GS	MPG	FG%	3P%	FT%	RPG	APG	SPG	BPG	TO	PPG
2017	Phoenix	3	0	5.7	50.0	0.0	0.0	**1.7**	0.3	0.0	0.0	**0.3**	0.7
2018	Phoenix	**4**	0	**8.0**	**63.6**	**100.0**	**100.0**	1.5	0.3	0.0	**0.8**	0.5	**4.3**
Career	2 years, 1 teams	7	0	7.0	61.5	100.0	100.0	1.6	0.3	0.0	0.4	0.4	2.7

=== College ===
Legend
GP	Games played	GS	Games started	MPG	Minutes per game
FG%	Field goal percentage	3P%	3-point field goal percentage	FT%	Free throw percentage
RPG	Rebounds per game	APG	Assists per game	SPG	Steals per game
BPG	Blocks per game	PPG	Points per game	**Bold**	Career high

Year	Team	GP	Points	FG%	3P%	FT%	RPG	APG	SPG	BPG	PPG
2005-06	Georgia	Redshirt									
2006-07	Georgia	**33**	263	54.2	66.7	60.9	5.4	0.3	0.5	0.9	8.0
2007-08	Georgia	**33**	328	51.2	10.0	**72.0**	8.4	**0.9**	**0.8**	1.5	9.9
2008-09	Georgia	32	**369**	**55.5**	57.1	71.7	**9.3**	0.8	**0.8**	**2.2**	**11.5**
2009-10	Georgia	30	228	48.1	**75.0**	68.3	7.6	0.7	0.6	2.0	7.6
Career totals	Georgia	128	1188	52.6	41.7	68.4	7.7	0.7	0.7	1.7	9.3
