= Yelena Leuchanka =

Belarusian basketball player (born 1983)

Personal information
- Born: 30 April 1983 (age 43) Homel, Belorussian SSR, Soviet Union
- Listed height: 6 ft 5 in (1.96 m)
- Listed weight: 194 lb (88 kg)

Career information
- College: Seminole CC (2001–2002); Wabash Valley (2002–2003); West Virginia (2003–2006)
- WNBA draft: 2006: undrafted
- Playing career: 2006–present
- Position: Center
- Number: 20

Career history
- 2006: Charlotte Sting
- 2006–2008: TEO Vilnius
- 2007: →Estudiantes
- 2007: Washington Mystics
- 2008–2009: Ekaterinburg
- 2009–2010: Galatasaray
- 2010: Gorzów Wielkopolski
- 2010: Atlanta Dream
- 2011: Wisła Kraków
- 2011–2013: Ekaterinburg
- 2012: Atlanta Dream
- 2013–2014: Good Angels Košice
- 2015–2016: Xinjiang Tishan Deers
- 2016–2018: Yakın Doğu Üniversitesi
- 2021: Panathinaikos
- Stats at Basketball Reference
Medals
Women's basketball
Representing Belarus
EuroBasket
Bronze medal – third place	2007 Italy

Yelena Leuchanka (Belarusian: Алена Сцяпанаўна Леўчанка; born 30 April 1983) is a Belarusian professional women's basketball player who last played for Panathinaikos.

== Biography ==
Prior to joining the Dream for their inaugural 2008 season, Leuchanka was a member of the Charlotte Sting in 2006 and Washington Mystics in 2007. She began her college career at Seminole Junior College. She also attended West Virginia University after transferring from Wabash Valley Junior College.

During the seasons 2011-12 and 2012-13 she was a member of the Atlanta Dream of the WNBA in the United States and UMMC Ekaterinburg in the Russian Superleague.

On 30 September 2020 Leuchanka was arrested at the Minsk National Airport. She was sentenced to 15 days of arrest for her participation in the 2020 Belarusian protests against the rule of president Alexander Lukashenko. She was re-arrested immediately after her release on the 15th of October, for unclear reasons.

== West Virginia statistics ==
Legend
GP	Games played	GS	Games started	MPG	Minutes per game
FG%	Field goal percentage	3P%	3-point field goal percentage	FT%	Free throw percentage
RPG	Rebounds per game	APG	Assists per game	SPG	Steals per game
BPG	Blocks per game	PPG	Points per game	**Bold**	Career high

Year	Team	GP	Points	FG%	3P%	FT%	RPG	APG	SPG	BPG	PPG
2003-04	West Virginia	1	4	-	-	**100.0**	**8.0**	-	-	1.0	4.0
2004-05	West Virginia	10	74	55.6	-	57.1	6.5	0.4	0.5	**1.2**	7.4
2005-06	West Virginia	**31**	**237**	**56.9**	-	77.0	6.1	**0.8**	**0.6**	1.1	**7.6**
Career	West Virginia	42	315	55.8	0.0	76.4	6.2	0.7	0.5	1.1	7.5

== National team ==
A member of the Belarus women's national basketball team, Leuchanka competed at the 2008 Summer Olympics for her country after leading the squad at the Olympic Qualifying Tournament in June 2008. She also competed at EuroBasket Women 2007 and EuroBasket Women 2009 for Belarus.
