= EuroBasket Women 2015 qualification =

The qualification for the EuroBasket Women 2015 was split in two parts. In the first round (7–25 June 2013) teams that has not qualified for the 2013 competition were eligible to enter. Second qualifying round was held from June 7 to June 25, 2014.

== First round ==
The first round is played from 7–25 June 2013 with the teams playing a round-robin. The top placed team from each group advanced to the semifinals.

The winner of the tournament qualified for the EuroBasket Women 2015.

=== Group stage ===
==== Group A ====
All game were played in Luxembourg.

Team	Pld	W	L	PF	PA	PD	Pts
Greece	3	3	0	199	170	+29	6
Estonia	3	2	1	199	165	+34	5
Netherlands	3	1	2	190	191	−1	4
Luxembourg	3	0	3	174	236	−62	3

7 June 2013
18:00

Boxscore

Greece	61–59	Netherlands
Scoring by quarter: 11–18, 14–6, 20–14, 16–21
Pts: Dimitrakou 22; Rebs: Chatzinikolaou, Spanou 8 Asts: Chatzinikolaou 4		Pts: Klein, van Grinsven 19; Rebs: van Grinsven 9 Asts: Bröring 3

Bertrange
Attendance: 150
Referees: Carlos Cortes (ESP), Neil Wilkinson (ENG), Luis Lopes (POR)

7 June 2013
20:15

Boxscore

Estonia	79–53	Luxembourg
Scoring by quarter: 24–7, 17–15, 17–15, 21–16
Pts: Nikolai 15; Rebs: Bratka 10; Asts: Anderson 9		Pts: Meynadier 14; Rebs: Schmitz 4 Asts: Schmit 4

Bertrange
Attendance: 150
Referees: Alessandro Martolini (ITA), Carole Delauné (FRA), Anne Panther (GER)

8 June 2013
18:00

Boxscore

Netherlands	54–77	Estonia
Scoring by quarter: 18–18, 16–12, 6–21, 14–26
Pts: van Grinsven 15; Rebs: van den Adel, van Grinsven 5 Asts: van den Adel 3		Pts: Anderson 22; Rebs: Rebane 10; Asts: Anderson 3

Bertrange
Attendance: 200
Referees: Carole Delauné (FRA), Anne Panther (GER), Sebastien Clivaz (SUI)

8 June 2013
20:15

Boxscore

Luxembourg	68–80	Greece
Scoring by quarter: 14–30, 16–10, 18–23, 20–17
Pts: Mossong 23; Rebs: Mossong 5 Asts: Hetting 5		Pts: Chatzinikolaou 20; Rebs: Spanou 10; Asts: Lymoura 6

Bertrange
Attendance: 200
Referees: Neil Wilkinson (ENG), Luis Lopes (POR), Alessandro Martolini (ITA)

9 June 2013
15:45

Boxscore

Estonia	43–58	Greece
Scoring by quarter: 8–15, 11–18, 12–11, 12–14
Pts: Nikolai 13; Rebs: Rebane 7 Asts: Nikolai, Rosenfeldt 3		Pts: Dimitrakou 12; Rebs: Sotiriou 7 Asts: Lymoura 4

Bertrange
Attendance: 200
Referees: Carlos Cortes (ESP), Alessandro Martolini (ITA), Sebastien Clivaz (SUI)

9 June 2013
18:00

Boxscore

Netherlands	77–53	Luxembourg
Scoring by quarter: 16–5, 23–13, 23–8, 15–27
Pts: van den Adel 13; Rebs: van Grinsven 15; Asts: Klein, van den Adel 5		Pts: Schmit 17; Rebs: Haentges 5 Asts: Schmit 4

Bertrange
Attendance: 200
Referees: Luis Lopes (POR), Neil Wilkinson (ENG), Anne Panther (GER)

==== Group B ====
All game were played in Samokov, Bulgaria.

Team	Pld	W	L	PF	PA	PD	Pts
Bulgaria	2	2	0	130	117	+13	4
Slovenia	2	1	1	136	133	+3	3
Switzerland	2	0	2	141	157	−16	2

7 June 2013
18:00

Boxscore

Bulgaria	57–52	Slovenia
Scoring by quarter: 18–16, 10–10, 17–16, 12–10
Pts: Tomova 18; Rebs: Miteva 13; Asts: Dimitrova 4		Pts: Oblak 13; Rebs: Piršić 11; Asts: Oblak 4

Arena Samokov, Samokov
Attendance: 200
Referees: Jose Ramon Garcia Ortiz (ESP), Jasmina Juras (SRB), Nikola Perlic (CRO)

8 June 2013
18:00

Boxscore

Slovenia	84–76	Switzerland
Scoring by quarter: 22–20, 23–13, 15–19, 24–24
Pts: Trebec 18; Rebs: Trebec 11; Asts: Abramovič 7		Pts: Twehues 21; Rebs: Giroud 9 Asts: Rol 8

Arena Samokov, Samokov
Attendance: 100
Referees: Jose Ramon Garcia Ortiz (ESP), Jasmina Juras (SRB), Fabiana Martinescu (ROU)

9 June 2013
18:00

Boxscore

Switzerland	65–73	Bulgaria
Scoring by quarter: 10–16, 8–19, 21–18, 26–20
Pts: Turin 26; Rebs: Giroud 12; Asts: Turin 4		Pts: Tomova 27; Rebs: Miteva 9 Asts: Guneva 6

Arena Samokov, Samokov
Attendance: 300
Referees: Jose Ramon Garcia Ortiz (ESP), Fabiana Martinescu (ROU), Nikola Perlic (CRO)

==== Group C ====
All game were played in Helsinki, Finland.

Team	Pld	W	L	PF	PA	PD	Pts
Poland	2	2	0	144	116	+28	4
Belgium	2	1	1	119	135	−16	3
Finland	2	0	2	112	124	−12	2

7 June 2013
19:00

Boxscore

Belgium	60–79	Poland
Scoring by quarter: 10–15, 13–24, 20–15, 17–25
Pts: Hendrickx 17; Rebs: Hendrickx 12; Asts: Hendrickx 3		Pts: Skobel 24; Rebs: Leciejewska 5 Asts: Idczak 4

Töölö Sports Hall, Helsinki
Attendance: 375
Referees: Andris Aunkrogers (LAT), Chris Dodds (SCO), Asa Johansson (SWE)

8 June 2013
17:15

Boxscore

Poland	65–56	Finland
Scoring by quarter: 19–14, 20–12, 12–15, 14–15
Pts: Leciejewska 16; Rebs: Leciejewska 9 Asts: Idczak 3		Pts: Piipari 15; Rebs: Korpivaara 6 Asts: Tuukkanen 3

Töölö Sports Hall, Helsinki
Attendance: 677
Referees: Gintaras Vitkauskas (LTU), Chris Dodds (SCO), Asa Johansson (SWE)

9 June 2013
17:00

Boxscore

Finland	56–59	Belgium
Scoring by quarter: 24–12, 9–13, 4–18, 19–16
Pts: Tuukkanen, Korpivaara 14; Rebs: Tuukkanen 12; Asts: Lehtoranta 2		Pts: Hendrickx 12; Rebs: Hendrickx 14; Asts: Mayombo 2

Töölö Sports Hall, Helsinki
Attendance: 575
Referees: Chris Dodds (SCO), Gintaras Vitkauskas (LTU), Andris Aunkrogers (LAT)

==== Group D ====
All game were played in Ramla, Israel.

Team	Pld	W	L	PF	PA	PD	Pts
Israel	3	3	0	199	169	+30	6
Germany	3	2	1	210	210	0	5
Macedonia	3	1	2	199	215	−16	4
Portugal	3	0	3	171	185	−14	3

7 June 2013
15:00

Boxscore

Israel	68–57	Germany
Scoring by quarter: 15–17, 15–11, 22–15, 16–14
Pts: Doron 19; Rebs: Fleischer 10; Asts: Doron 7		Pts: three players 9 Rebs: Fikiel 12; Asts: Mersch 5

Kiriat Menahem Arena, Ramla
Attendance: 1,000
Referees: Georgios Tanatzis (GRE), Piotr Pastusiak (POL), Maka Kupatadze (GEO)

7 June 2013
17:45

Boxscore

Portugal	56–60	Macedonia
Scoring by quarter: 16–17, 9–14, 8–13, 23–16
Pts: Freitas 14; Rebs: Da Silva 12; Asts: Nascimento 3		Pts: Dimovska 19; Rebs: Gavriloska 13; Asts: Dimovska, Givens 3

Kiriat Menahem Arena, Ramla
Attendance: 50
Referees: Aleksandar Glisic (SRB), Antonis Demetriou (CYP), Özlem Yalman (TUR)

8 June 2013
18:00

Boxscore

Germany	66–59	Portugal
Scoring by quarter: 20–14, 23–17, 13–10, 10–18
Pts: Breitreiner 21; Rebs: Fikiel 16; Asts: Skuballa 5		Pts: Correia 16; Rebs: Da Silva 13; Asts: Nascimento 4

Kiriat Menahem Arena, Ramla
Attendance: 50
Referees: Georgios Tanatzis (GRE), Piotr Pastusiak (POL), Özlem Yalman (TUR)

8 June 2013
20:45

Boxscore

Macedonia	56–72	Israel
Scoring by quarter: 19–14, 12–26, 14–15, 11–17
Pts: Givens 25; Rebs: Givens 11; Asts: Givens 5		Pts: Fleischer 17; Rebs: Fleischer 17; Asts: Cohen 7

Kiriat Menahem Arena, Ramla
Attendance: 500
Referees: Maka Kupatadze (GEO), Antonis Demetriou (CYP), Semen Ovinov (RUS)

9 June 2013
18:00

Boxscore

Portugal	56–59	Israel
Scoring by quarter: 12–16, 15–13, 12–18, 17–12
Pts: Correia 16; Rebs: Nascimento 10; Asts: Faustino 4		Pts: Epstein 14; Rebs: Abramzon 10; Asts: Cohen 10

Kiriat Menahem Arena, Ramla
Attendance: 500
Referees: Georgios Tanatzis (GRE), Maka Kupatadze (GEO), Semen Ovinov (RUS)

9 June 2013
20:45

Boxscore

Germany	87–83 (OT)	Macedonia
Scoring by quarter: 13–21, 23–14, 25–20, 14–20, Overtime: 12–8
Pts: Skuballa 25; Rebs: Fikiel 18; Asts: three players 4		Pts: Dimovska 27; Rebs: Gavriloska 14; Asts: Givens 6

Kiriat Menahem Arena, Ramla
Attendance: 50
Referees: Antonis Demetriou (CYP), Aleksandar Glisic (SRB), Özlem Yalman (TUR)

=== Knockout stage ===
The teams were numbered 1 to 4 according to their results in the group stage and played a two-legged series. The winners advanced to the final.

==== Bracket ====
Semifinals
1	Poland	44	65	109
4	Bulgaria	59	44	103
2	Israel	57	57	114
3	Greece	69	66	135

Final
1	Poland	46	57	103
3	Greece	61	56	117

==== Semifinals ====
===== First leg =====
15 June 2013
18:00

Boxscore

Bulgaria	59–44	Poland
Scoring by quarter: 20–13, 11–6, 17–15, 11–10
Pts: Dimitrova 22; Rebs: Tomova 12; Asts: Tomova, Dimitrova 3		Pts: Leciejewska 10; Rebs: Leciejewska 6 Asts: Owczarzak, Idczak 3

Arena Samokov, Samokov
Attendance: 500
Referees: Uros Obrknezevic (SRB), Regis Bardera (FRA), Tamas Földhazi (HUN)

15 June 2013
18:30

Boxscore

Greece	69–57	Israel
Scoring by quarter: 21–15, 22–12, 14–17, 12–13
Pts: Spanou 21; Rebs: Spanou 14; Asts: Lymoura 5		Pts: Epstein 19; Rebs: Epstein, Levitsky 5 Asts: Doron, Cohen 3

Athens
Attendance: 500
Referees: Marco Giansanti (ITA), Haris Bijedic (BIH), Milan Brziak (SVK)

===== Second leg =====
18 June 2013
18:00

Boxscore

Poland	65–44	Bulgaria
Scoring by quarter: 15–7, 21–9, 22–11, 7–17
Pts: Misiek 12; Rebs: Majewska 10; Asts: Idczak 5		Pts: Tomova 10; Rebs: Tomova 6 Asts: Dimitrova 2

Władysławowo
Attendance: 300
Referees: Ivo Dolinek (CZE), Nebojsa Kovacevic (GER), Andrei Sharapa (BLR)

18 June 2013
20:00

Boxscore

Israel	57–66	Greece
Scoring by quarter: 14–15, 15–18, 11–15, 17–18
Pts: Epstein 11; Rebs: Levitsky 10; Asts: Doron 5		Pts: Chatzinikolaou 12; Rebs: Papamichail 9 Asts: four players 3

Kiriat Menahem Arena, Ramla
Attendance: 800
Referees: Sreten Radovic (CRO), Milos Koljensic (MNE), Vladyslav Isachenko (UKR)

==== Final ====
===== First leg =====
22 June 2013
18:00

Boxscore

Greece	61–46	Poland
Scoring by quarter: 23–10, 8–12, 12–8, 18–16
Pts: Spanou 18; Rebs: Chatzinikolaou 9 Asts: Lymoura 4		Pts: Pawlak, Idczak 11; Rebs: Majewska 7 Asts: three players 2

Athens
Attendance: 500
Referees: Ademir Zurapovic (BIH), Marco Giansanti (ITA), David Romano (ISR)

===== Second leg =====
25 June 2013
18:00

Boxscore

Poland	57–56	Greece
Scoring by quarter: 12–12, 23–16, 8–15, 14–13
Pts: Szott-Hejmej 14; Rebs: Skorek, Majewska 4 Asts: Idczak 5		Pts: Spanou 19; Rebs: Sotiriou, Spanou 7 Asts: Spanou 6

Władysławowo
Attendance: 800
Referees: Miguel Anguel Perez Niz (ESP), Juris Kokainis (LAT), Clemens Fritz (GER)

== Second round ==
The second round was played from 7–25 June 2014 with the teams playing a round-robin. 22 teams competed in the second qualification round, vying for 11 remaining spots available to EuroBasket Women in June 2015. The teams were divided into four groups of four and two groups of three teams each. Each team played every other team in its group on a home and away basis with the six group winners and five second-best placed teams joining the already qualified teams in Hungary and Romania. These are the seeding pots used in the process of the draw.

Pot 1	Pot 2	Pot 3	Pot 4
Sweden; Italy; Great Britain; Montenegro; Croatia; Slovakia	Russia; Lithuania; Ukraine; Latvia; Poland; Bulgaria	Israel; Estonia; Germany; Slovenia; Belgium; Netherlands	Macedonia; Portugal; Finland; Luxembourg

The draw for the second qualification round was completed in Freising, Germany on 1 December 2013.

Group A	Group B	Group C	Group D	Group E	Group F
Poland; Slovakia; Slovenia; Luxembourg	Lithuania; Great Britain; Belgium; Macedonia	Latvia; Italy; Estonia; Portugal	Ukraine; Montenegro; Germany; Finland	Russia; Sweden; Netherlands	Bulgaria; Croatia; Israel

=== Group A ===
Team	Pld	W	L	PF	PA	PD	Pts
Slovakia	6	5	1	433	323	+110	11
Poland	6	5	1	395	329	+66	11
Slovenia	6	2	4	361	365	−4	8
Luxembourg	6	0	6	253	425	−172	6

8 June 2014
17:00

Boxscore

Poland	66–33	Luxembourg
Scoring by quarter: 16–9, 12–8, 21–10, 17–6
Pts: Skorek 14; Rebs: Skobel 9 Asts: Pawlak, Skobel 4		Pts: Jablonowski 9 Rebs: Jablonowski, Schmitz 5 Asts: Schmit 6

SMS PZKosz Wladyslawowo, Władysławowo
Attendance: 300
Referees: Nebojsa Kovačević (GER), Vladyslav Isachenko (UKR), Stanislav Kučera (CZE)

8 June 2014
18:00

Boxscore

Slovakia	74–58	Slovenia
Scoring by quarter: 18–15, 14–15, 19–10, 23–18
Pts: Tetemondová 13; Rebs: Hruscáková 8 Asts: Žirková 7		Pts: Oblak, Barič 14; Rebs: Pirsic 6 Asts: Boada 3

Infiniti Aréna, Košice
Attendance: 600
Referees: Tamás Benczur (HUN), Alexandru Olaru (ROU), Branislav Mrdak (SRB)

11 June 2014
18:00

Boxscore

Slovenia	59–68	Poland
Scoring by quarter: 15–28, 15–8, 14–14, 15–18
Pts: Barič 19; Rebs: Lisec 13; Asts: Barič 4		Pts: Żurowska 14; Rebs: Kobryn 8 Asts: Idczak 3

Dvorana Vitranc, Kranjska Gora
Attendance: 150
Referees: Tolga Sahin (ITA), Tomislav Hordov (CRO), Markos Michaelides (SUI)

11 June 2014
19:30

Boxscore

Luxembourg	42–70	Slovakia
Scoring by quarter: 10–23, 15–19, 6–13, 11–15
Pts: Schmit 14; Rebs: Orban 6 Asts: Schmit 6		Pts: Baburová 13; Rebs: Jurčenková 9 Asts: Baburová 4

Centre sportif Am Sand, Oberanven
Attendance: 210
Referees: Regis Bardera (FRA), Christof Madinger (GER), Alexander Eger (AUT)

15 June 2014
17:00

Boxscore

Poland	75–70 (OT)	Slovakia
Scoring by quarter: 19–12, 15–13, 15–20, 12–16, Overtime: 14–9
Pts: Kobryn 23; Rebs: Kobryn 9 Asts: Kobryn 3		Pts: Toliver 17; Rebs: Hruscáková, Jurčenková 10; Asts: Toliver 8

SMS PZKosz Wladyslawowo, Władysławowo
Attendance: 550
Referees: Borys Shulga (UKR), Aliaksandr Syrytsa (BLR), Ilya Putenko (RUS)

15 June 2014
18:00

Boxscore

Slovenia	75–35	Luxembourg
Scoring by quarter: 20–11, 20–4, 20–10, 15–10
Pts: Abramović 11; Rebs: Lisec 8 Asts: Oblak, Abramović 5		Pts: three players 8 Rebs: Orban 8 Asts: Jablonowski 3

Dvorana Vitranc, Kranjska Gora
Attendance: 100
Referees: Maja Vukanović (SRB), Mila Cavara (BIH), Jelena Tomić (CRO)

18 June 2014
15:00

Boxscore

Slovenia	52–66	Slovakia
Scoring by quarter: 12–20, 17–18, 6–17, 17–11
Pts: Pirsic 11; Rebs: Pirsic 7 Asts: Boada 3		Pts: Tetemondová 17; Rebs: Hruscáková 7 Asts: Žirková, Toliver 6

Dvorana Vitranc, Kranjska Gora
Attendance: 100
Referees: Marius Ciulin (ROU), Rüstü Nuran (TUR), Ivan Miličević (BIH)

18 June 2014
19:30

Boxscore

Luxembourg	45–66	Poland
Scoring by quarter: 10–14, 20–27, 6–13, 9–17
Pts: Schmit 13; Rebs: Orban 6 Asts: Schmit 3		Pts: Zurowska, Misiuk 12; Rebs: Misiuk 7 Asts: Pawlak 6

Centre sportif Am Sand, Oberanven
Attendance: 180
Referees: Jasmina Juras (SRB), Sonia Teixeira (POR), Vasiliki Tsaroucha (GRE)

22 June 2014
17:00

Boxscore

Poland	65–51	Slovenia
Scoring by quarter: 15–10, 16–9, 17–16, 17–16
Pts: Krezel 17; Rebs: Skobel 7 Asts: Krezel 4		Pts: Lisec 11; Rebs: Lisec 6 Asts: Oblak, Barič 3

SMS PZKosz Wladyslawowo, Władysławowo
Attendance: 720
Referees: Ilona Kučerová (CZE), Anne Panther (GER), Ivana Ivanović (SRB)

22 June 2014
18:00

Boxscore

Slovakia	82–41	Luxembourg
Scoring by quarter: 35–15, 16–6, 13–6, 18–14
Pts: Hruscáková 14; Rebs: Tetemondová 8 Asts: Toliver, Bálintová 4		Pts: Jablonowski 12; Rebs: Orban 6 Asts: Schmit 2

Infiniti Aréna, Košice
Attendance: 500
Referees: Asa Johansson (SWE), Jelena Smiljanić (SRB), Andrada Csender (ROU)

25 June 2014
18:00

Boxscore

Slovakia	71–55	Poland
Scoring by quarter: 23–12, 15–13, 18–14, 15–16
Pts: Jurčenková 19; Rebs: Hruscáková 6 Asts: Toliver 6		Pts: Zietara, Koc 10; Rebs: Zurowska 8 Asts: Pawlak, Zietara 2

Infiniti Aréna, Košice
Attendance: 1,500
Referees: Clemens Fritz (GER), Mathieu Bayot (BEL), Tanel Suslov (EST)

25 June 2014
19:30

Boxscore

Luxembourg	57–66	Slovenia
Scoring by quarter: 12–17, 18–19, 13–12, 14–18
Pts: Schreiner 15; Rebs: Hetting 7 Asts: Mossong 3		Pts: three players 12; Rebs: Barič, Lisec 5 Asts: Lisec 3

Centre sportif Am Sand, Oberanven
Attendance: 50
Referees: Chris Dodds (SCO), Vincent Delestrée (BEL), Johann Jeanneau (FRA)

=== Group B ===
Team	Pld	W	L	PF	PA	PD	Pts
Lithuania	6	5	1	518	407	+111	11
Great Britain	6	4	2	403	383	+20	10
Belgium	6	3	3	466	412	+54	9
Macedonia	6	0	6	362	547	−185	6

8 June 2014
13:00

Boxscore

Great Britain	56–49	Belgium
Scoring by quarter: 22–19, 12–14, 12–14, 10–2
Pts: Vanderwal 17; Rebs: Stewart, Allen 8 Asts: four players 3		Pts: Hendrickx 10; Rebs: Van Malderen, Hendrickx 5 Asts: Van Malderen, Mayombo 3

Worcester Arena, Worcester
Attendance: 500
Referees: Aleksandar Glisić (SRB), Clemens Fritz (GER), Christoph Rohacky (AUT)

8 June 2014
18:00

Boxscore

Lithuania	108–66	Macedonia
Scoring by quarter: 19–14, 23–16, 38–22, 28–14
Pts: Petronytė 20; Rebs: Kuktiene 8 Asts: Gutkauskaitė, Solopova 4		Pts: Givens 27; Rebs: Givens 12; Asts: Givens 6

Kėdainiai Arena, Kėdainiai
Attendance: 1,500
Referees: Arnis Ozols (LAT), Sergei Beliakov (RUS), Paul Unsworth (ENG)

11 June 2014
19:30

Boxscore

Macedonia	53–78	Great Britain
Scoring by quarter: 11–23, 8–16, 17–18, 17–21
Pts: Givens 21; Rebs: Trajchevska 6 Asts: Givens, Mitrasinovik 2		Pts: Fagbenle 15; Rebs: Stewart 11; Asts: Vanderwal 7

Jasmin Sports Hall, Kavadarci
Attendance: 500
Referees: Fabiana Martinescu (ROU), Maka Kupatadze (GEO), Özlem Yalman (TUR)

11 June 2014
20:00

Boxscore

Belgium	67–77	Lithuania
Scoring by quarter: 21–16, 6–15, 18–22, 22–24
Pts: Vanloo 15; Rebs: Hendrickx 9 Asts: three players 2		Pts: Kuktiene 18; Rebs: Pikčiūtė 9 Asts: Okockyte 2

Lotto Arena, Antwerp
Attendance: 300
Referees: Haydn Jones (WAL), Sebastien Clivaz (SUI), Johann Jeanneau (FRA)

15 June 2014
15:00

Boxscore

Belgium	94–66	Macedonia
Scoring by quarter: 22–20, 27–9, 29–20, 16–17
Pts: Van Malderen 12; Rebs: Hendrickx 7 Asts: Hendrickx, Vanloo 4		Pts: Givens 20; Rebs: Kmetovska 9 Asts: Givens, Mitrasinovik 1

Lotto Arena, Antwerp
Attendance: 350
Referees: Susana López (ESP), Ilona Kucerová (CZE), Pascale Weiwers (LUX)

15 June 2014
18:00

Boxscore

Lithuania	81–61	Great Britain
Scoring by quarter: 11–13, 24–17, 23–14, 23–17
Pts: three players 14; Rebs: Petronytė 6 Asts: Solopova 4		Pts: Fagbenle 16; Rebs: Collins 10; Asts: Gandy 4

Kėdainiai Arena, Kėdainiai
Attendance: 500
Referees: Fabiana Martinescu (ROU), Maka Kupatadze (GEO), Özlem Yalman (TUR)

18 June 2014
19:30

Boxscore

Macedonia	59–101	Lithuania
Scoring by quarter: 16–31, 10–22, 20–24, 13–24
Pts: Givens 29; Rebs: Givens 6 Asts: Givens 6		Pts: Petronytė 19; Rebs: Grigalauskytė, Pikčiūtė 8 Asts: Okockyte 5

Jasmin Sports Hall, Kavadarci
Attendance: 500
Referees: Vladimir Tsekov (BUL), Zafer Yılmaz (TUR), Erion Hoxhaj (ALB)

18 June 2014
20:00

Boxscore

Belgium	70–74 (OT)	Great Britain
Scoring by quarter: 20–16, 13–8, 14–18, 13–18, Overtime: 10–14
Pts: Hendrickx, Mayombo 15; Rebs: Mestdagh, Hendrickx 8 Asts: Delaere, Mestdagh 4		Pts: Fagbenle 26; Rebs: Fagbenle 11

Lotto Arena, Antwerp
Attendance: 350
Referees: Sreten Radović (CRO), Paulo Marques (POR), Uroš Obrknežević (SRB)

22 June 2014
14:00

Boxscore

Great Britain	71–60	Macedonia
Scoring by quarter: 18–18, 26–17, 18–12, 9–13
Pts: three players 15; Rebs: Allen 11; Asts: Collins 4		Pts: Givens 30; Rebs: Givens 9 Asts: Givens 5

Worcester Arena, Worcester
Attendance: 656
Referees: Robert Vyklický (CZE), Sebastien Clivaz (SUI), Pedro Coelho (POR)

22 June 2014
18:00

Boxscore

Lithuania	81–91	Belgium
Scoring by quarter: 20–26, 23–26, 17–19, 21–20
Pts: Pikčiūtė 16; Rebs: Šikšniūtė 7 Asts: Okockyte 6		Pts: Van Malderen 26; Rebs: Van Malderen 8 Asts: Mayombo 6

Kėdainiai Arena, Kėdainiai
Attendance: 1,200
Referees: Apostolos Kalpakas (SWE), Johannes Sarekoski (FIN), Timo Suslov (EST)

25 June 2014
19:00

Boxscore

Great Britain	63–70	Lithuania
Scoring by quarter: 14–19, 13–13, 20–18, 16–20
Pts: Vanderwal 13; Rebs: Stewart 12; Asts: Vanderwal 4		Pts: Nacickaitė 16; Rebs: Pikčiūtė 5 Asts: Solopova, Kvederavičiūtė 3

Worcester Arena, Worcester
Attendance: 1,012
Referees: Roberto Chiari (ITA), Marek Cmikiewicz (POL), Yener Yılmaz (TUR)

25 June 2014
19:30

Boxscore

Macedonia	58–95	Belgium
Scoring by quarter: 13–21, 10–31, 20–20, 15–23
Pts: Givens 38; Rebs: Givens 12; Asts: Givens 3		Pts: Vanloo 16; Rebs: Van Malderen 8 Asts: Mayombo 4

Jasmin Sports Hall, Kavadarci
Attendance: 250
Referees: Igor Dragojević (MNE), Ventsislav Velikov (BUL), Csaba Cziffra (HUN)

=== Group C ===
Team	Pld	W	L	PF	PA	PD	Pts
Latvia	6	5	1	427	374	+53	11
Italy	6	4	2	377	347	+30	10
Portugal	6	2	4	347	377	−30	8
Estonia	6	1	5	346	399	−53	7

8 June 2014
18:30

Boxscore

Italy	66–58	Estonia
Scoring by quarter: 14–18, 18–10, 14–15, 20–15
Pts: Dotto 12; Rebs: Fassina, Laterza 5 Asts: Sottana 4		Pts: Rebane 14; Rebs: Miil, Rebane 7 Asts: three players 2

PalaSport di Via delle Tagliate, Lucca
Attendance: 1,500
Referees: Sreten Radović (CRO), Mario Majkič (SVN), Petar Denkovski (MKD)

8 June 2014
20:15

Boxscore

Latvia	71–61	Portugal
Scoring by quarter: 20–20, 16–13, 21–5, 14–23
Pts: Putniņa 19; Rebs: Tamane 7 Asts: Eglīte 4		Pts: Ferreira 14; Rebs: Domingues, Nascimento 6 Asts: Nascimento 3

Olympic Sports Centre, Riga, Riga
Attendance: 650
Referees: Apostolos Kalpakas (SWE), Henri Hilke (FIN), Rune Ressel Larsen (DEN)

11 June 2014
18:00

Boxscore

Estonia	56–74	Latvia
Scoring by quarter: 12–18, 10–17, 13–20, 21–19
Pts: Püü 17; Rebs: Miil, Anderson 6 Asts: Anderson 6		Pts: Babkina 18; Rebs: Šteinberga 7 Asts: Babkina 5

Kalevi Spordihall, Tallinn
Attendance: 600
Referees: Carole Delauné (FRA), Elena Chernova (RUS), Gizella Györgyi (NOR)

11 June 2014
21:00

Boxscore

Portugal	54–52	Italy
Scoring by quarter: 16–8, 8–18, 16–7, 14–19
Pts: Oliveira 15; Rebs: Da Silva 7 Asts: four players 4		Pts: Santucci, Spreafico 9 Rebs: Santucci 5 Asts: Sottana 7

Pavilhão Multiusos de Coimbra, Coimbra
Attendance: 300
Referees: Keith Williams (ENG), Tomislav Vovk (CRO), Eric Bertrand (SUI)

15 June 2014
18:00

Boxscore

Estonia	67–60	Portugal
Scoring by quarter: 19–18, 17–14, 12–17, 19–11
Pts: Miil, Anderson 12; Rebs: Rebane 9 Asts: Anderson 5		Pts: Faustino 16; Rebs: Domingues 8 Asts: four players 1

Kalevi Spordihall, Tallinn
Attendance: 250
Referees: Marek Maliszewski (POL), Semen Ovinov (RUS), Volodymyr Pediev (UKR)

15 June 2014
20:15

Boxscore

Latvia	70–59	Italy
Scoring by quarter: 19–18, 8–10, 22–7, 21–24
Pts: Kreslina 13; Rebs: Melnika 10; Asts: B. Eglite 4		Pts: Sottana 17; Rebs: Fassina 7 Asts: Sottana 5

Olympic Sports Centre, Riga, Riga
Attendance: 710
Referees: Marek Cmikiewicz (POL), Moritz Reiter (GER), Petr Hrůša (CZE)

18 June 2014
18:00

Boxscore

Estonia	45–52	Italy
Scoring by quarter: 13–13, 11–7, 12–19, 9–13
Pts: Püü 15; Rebs: Bratka 6 Asts: Anderson 4		Pts: Sottana 18; Rebs: Laterza 7 Asts: Sottana, Dotto 2

Kalevi Spordihall, Tallinn
Attendance: 500
Referees: Piotr Pastusiak (POL), Václav Lukeš (CZE), Milan Brziak (SVK)

18 June 2014
21:00

Boxscore

Portugal	55–62	Latvia
Scoring by quarter: 19–18, 12–9, 12–17, 12–18
Pts: Correia 14; Rebs: Da Silva 6 Asts: Ferreira 5		Pts: B. Eglite 13; Rebs: Putniņa 13; Asts: Babkina 5

Pavilhão Pêro Vaz de Caminha, Caminha
Attendance: 400
Referees: Miguel Niz (ESP), Markos Michaelides (SUI), Francis Santos (GIB)

22 June 2014
20:15

Boxscore

Latvia	82–60	Estonia
Scoring by quarter: 20–16, 15–15, 25–16, 22–13
Pts: Putniņa 16; Rebs: Melnika 7 Asts: Babkina		Pts: Rebane 17; Rebs: Rebane 5 Asts: Püü 8

Olympic Sports Centre, Riga, Riga
Attendance: 700
Referees: Neil Wilkinson (ENG), Nebojsa Kovačević (GER), Dariusz Szczerba (POL)

22 June 2014
20:30

Boxscore

Italy	65–52	Portugal
Scoring by quarter: 11–15, 13–10, 12–9, 29–18
Pts: Dotto 20; Rebs: Consolini 6 Asts: Sottana, Dotto 3		Pts: Da Silva 19; Rebs: Da Silva 10; Asts: Faustino 4

PalaPadua, Ragusa
Attendance: 2,000
Referees: Sašo Petek (SLO), Paul Walton (ENG), Luka Kardum (CRO)

25 June 2014
20:30

Boxscore

Italy	83–68	Latvia
Scoring by quarter: 18–21, 21–20, 17–15, 27–12
Pts: Dotto 23; Rebs: Fassina 4 Asts: three players 2		Pts: Babkina 14; Rebs: Melnika 8 Asts: Babkina 3

PalaPadua, Ragusa
Attendance: 2,000
Referees: Dragan Nešković (SRB), Bernard Vassallo (MLT), Nikola Perlić (CRO)

25 June 2014
20:30

Boxscore

Portugal	65–60 (OT)	Estonia
Scoring by quarter: 18–19, 8–12, 24–17, 6–8, Overtime: 9–4
Pts: Da Silva 25; Rebs: Da Silva 16; Asts: Nascimento 4		Pts: Anderson 16; Rebs: Jallai, Bratka 8 Asts: Anderson 3

Pavilhão Maristas de Carcavelos, Carcavelos
Attendance: 500
Referees: Milivoje Jovčić (SRB), Simon Unsworth (ENG), Antonio Zamora (AND)

=== Group D ===
Team	Pld	W	L	PF	PA	PD	Pts
Montenegro	6	5	1	427	379	+48	11
Ukraine	6	5	1	476	396	+80	11
Finland	6	1	5	377	450	−73	7
Germany	6	1	5	383	438	−55	7

8 June 2014
17:00

Boxscore

Ukraine	83–49	Finland
Scoring by quarter: 21–16, 21–13, 25–8, 16–12
Pts: Iagupova 22; Rebs: Berezhynska 6 Asts: Iagupova, Berezhynska 4		Pts: Tuukkanen 11; Rebs: Tuukkanen, Pounds 5 Asts: Pounds 5

Pasila Sports Hall, Helsinki
Attendance: 326
Referees: Tomasz Trawicki (POL), Andris Aunkrogers (LAT), Torkild Rodsand (NOR)

8 June 2014
18:00

Boxscore

Montenegro	63–52	Germany
Scoring by quarter: 23–19, 15–17, 15–9, 10–7
Pts: Dubljević 14; Rebs: Dubljević 11; Asts: Škerović 7		Pts: Brunckhorst 11; Rebs: Fikiel 8 Asts: Bär 6

Sportski centar Lovćen, Cetinje
Attendance: 744
Referees: Marko Vučković (SVN), Nikolaos Somos (GRE), Milen Tsvetkov (BUL)

10 June 2014
19:00

Boxscore

Finland	52–75	Ukraine
Scoring by quarter: 17–19, 20–16, 11–20, 4–20
Pts: Tuukkanen 13; Rebs: Gross 8 Asts: Pounds 3		Pts: Iagupova 25; Rebs: Malashenko 7 Asts: Spitkovska 5

Töölö Sports Hall, Helsinki
Attendance: 380
Referees: Juris Kokainis (LAT), Mindaugas Vecerskis (LTU), Mart Uuehendrik (EST)

11 June 2014
19:30

Boxscore

Germany	48–60	Montenegro
Scoring by quarter: 16–20, 10–14, 10–12, 12–14
Pts: Bär 18; Rebs: Bär 7 Asts: Brunckhorst 3		Pts: Murphy 21; Rebs: Škerović 7 Asts: Škerović 5

Enervie Arena, Hagen
Attendance: 714
Referees: Anton Makhlin (RUS), Fedja Serhatlic (SWE), Wojciech Liszka (POL)

15 June 2014
17:00

Boxscore

Germany	72–81	Ukraine
Scoring by quarter: 16–23, 17–20, 21–18, 18–20
Pts: Bär 27; Rebs: Bär 8 Asts: Brunckhorst 4		Pts: Malashenko 21; Rebs: Dorogobuzova, Berezhynska 7 Asts: four players 3

Enervie Arena, Hagen
Attendance: 807
Referees: Renaud Geller (BEL), Paulus Van Den Heuvel (NED), Mathieu Hosselet (FRA)

15 June 2014
19:00

Boxscore

Montenegro	75–72	Finland
Scoring by quarter: 24–12, 14–19, 21–13, 16–28
Pts: Perovanović 17; Rebs: Dubljević 9 Asts: Dubljević 6		Pts: Pounds 25; Rebs: Tuukkanen 7 Asts: Tuukkanen, Lehtoranta 4

Sportski centar Lovćen, Cetinje
Attendance: 814
Referees: Carmelo Paternico (ITA), Aytug Ekti (TUR), Tamás Benczur (HUN)

17 June 2014
19:30

Boxscore

Ukraine	92–76	Germany
Scoring by quarter: 17–26, 24–6, 29–14, 22–30
Pts: Iagupova 20; Rebs: Berezhynska, Dorogobuzova 7 Asts: three players 3		Pts: Breitreiner 17; Rebs: Fikiel 6 Asts: Bär 7

Enervie Arena, Hagen
Attendance: 545
Referees: Mathieu Bayot (BEL), Anthonie Sinterniklaas (NED), Marc Mouton (LUX)

18 June 2014
20:00

Boxscore

Finland	62–82	Montenegro
Scoring by quarter: 10–24, 16–24, 17–15, 19–19
Pts: Pounds 20; Rebs: Gross 7 Asts: Lehtoranta 2		Pts: Dubljević 24; Rebs: Dubljević 13; Asts: Perovanović 5

Töölö Sports Hall, Helsinki
Attendance: 335
Referees: Grzegorz Ziemblicki (POL), Martynas Gudas (LTU), Oskars Lucis (LAT)

22 June 2014
17:00

Boxscore

Germany	84–79	Finland
Scoring by quarter: 27–20, 19–25, 16–15, 22–19
Pts: Bär, Koop 19; Rebs: Skuballa 9 Asts: Bär 8		Pts: Pounds 36; Rebs: Tuukkanen 9 Asts: Lehtoranta 6

Enervie Arena, Hagen
Attendance: 700
Referees: Ivo Dolinek (CZE), Gellért Kapitány (HUN), Dariusz Zapolski (POL)

23 June 2014
20:00

Boxscore

Ukraine	75–71	Montenegro
Scoring by quarter: 16–18, 19–11, 20–16, 20–26
Pts: Kurasova 18; Rebs: Iagupova 10; Asts: Iagupova 5		Pts: Dubljević 25; Rebs: Škerović, Dubljević 7 Asts: Aleksić 3

Sportski centar Lovćen, Cetinje
Attendance: 512
Referees: Georgios Tanatzis (GRE), Saverio Lanzarini (ITA), Christoph Rohacky (AUT)

25 June 2014
19:00

Boxscore

Finland	63–51	Germany
Scoring by quarter: 19–12, 16–11, 13–12, 15–16
Pts: Tuukkanen 24; Rebs: Tuukkanen 10; Asts: Pounds 3		Pts: Bär, Greinacher 10; Rebs: Bär 6 Asts: Bär 4

Töölö Sports Hall, Helsinki
Attendance: 359
Referees: Piotr Pastusiak (POL), Haydn Jones (WAL), Saulius Racys (SWE)

25 June 2014
20:00

Boxscore

Montenegro	76–70	Ukraine
Scoring by quarter: 19–17, 12–19, 22–15, 23–19
Pts: Perovanović 25; Rebs: Perovanović 9 Asts: Škerović 5		Pts: Mircheva, Iagupova 20; Rebs: Iagupova 9 Asts: Iagupova 7

Sportski centar Lovćen, Cetinje
Attendance: 515
Referees: Marcin Kowalski (POL), Georgios Poursanidis (GRE), Ilias Kounelles (CYP)

=== Group E ===
Team	Pld	W	L	PF	PA	PD	Pts
Russia	4	3	1	254	212	+42	7
Sweden	4	3	1	253	213	+40	7
Netherlands	4	0	4	200	282	−82	4

7 June 2014
19:00

Boxscore

Russia	65–51	Sweden
Scoring by quarter: 10–10, 22–13, 16–11, 17–17
Pts: Karpunina, Belyakova 14; Rebs: Osipova 8 Asts: Belyakova 9		Pts: F. Eldebrink, Key 12; Rebs: Barthold 9 Asts: E. Eldebrink 4

Krylatskoe Sport Palace, Moscow
Attendance: 675
Referees: Jasmina Juras (SRB), Karolina Andersson (FIN), Özlem Yalman (TUR)

11 June 2014
19:00

Boxscore

Sweden	72–45	Netherlands
Scoring by quarter: 17–12, 14–9, 27–17, 14–7
Pts: Key 18; Rebs: Halvarsson 13; Asts: F. Eldebrink 5		Pts: van Grinsven 13; Rebs: van Grinsven 10; Asts: Klein, Kuijt 2

Luleå Energi Arena, Luleå
Attendance: 1,821
Referees: Marcin Kowalski (POL), Gintaras Vitkauskas (LTU), Marko Vladic (AUT)

15 June 2014
14:00

Boxscore

Netherlands	60–68	Russia
Scoring by quarter: 13–16, 12–16, 20–17, 15–19
Pts: De Kleijn, Van den Adel 14; Rebs: Van Grinsven 9 Asts: Van Grinsven 3		Pts: Belyakova 13; Rebs: Belyakova 13; Asts: Osipova 4

Sporthallen Zuid, Amsterdam
Attendance: 900
Referees: Neil Wilkinson (ENG), Konstantin Simonow (GER), Nick Van den Broeck (BEL)

18 June 2014
19:00

Boxscore

Sweden	57–52	Russia
Scoring by quarter: 13–13, 18–14, 15–18, 11–7
Pts: Halvarsson 22; Rebs: Halvarsson 8 Asts: F. Eldebrink, Loyd 4		Pts: Grishaeva 23; Rebs: Osipova 10; Asts: Belyakova 4

Täljehallen, Södertälje
Attendance: 1,625
Referees: Olegs Latisevs (LAT), Sérgio Silva (POR), Simon Unsworth (ENG)

22 June 2014
14:00

Boxscore

Netherlands	51–73	Sweden
Scoring by quarter: 13–20, 4–15, 16–8, 18–30
Pts: Bröring, Van Grinsven 12; Rebs: Treffers, Van Grinsven 8 Asts: Ligthart 3		Pts: Barthold 17; Rebs: Halvarsson 12; Asts: F. Eldebrink 7

Sporthallen Zuid, Amsterdam
Attendance: 900
Referees: Anna Cardus (ESP), Maja Vukanović (SRB), Gizella Györgyi (NOR)

25 June 2014
19:00

Boxscore

Russia	69–44	Netherlands
Scoring by quarter: 22–3, 19–12, 12–20, 16–9
Pts: Tikhonenko 14; Rebs: Osipova 14; Asts: Abrikosova 7		Pts: Bröring 9 Rebs: Van den Adel 7 Asts: Van den Adel 3

Krylatskoe Sport Palace, Moscow
Attendance: 500
Referees: Rüstü Nuran (TUR), Marko Juras (SRB), Artūras Šukys (LTU)

=== Group F ===
Team	Pld	W	L	PF	PA	PD	Pts
Croatia	4	4	0	306	245	+61	8
Bulgaria	4	1	3	259	288	−29	5
Israel	4	1	3	270	302	−32	5

8 June 2014
17:30

Boxscore

Bulgaria	65–69	Croatia
Scoring by quarter: 19–17, 18–23, 15–19, 13–10
Pts: Dimitrova 21; Rebs: Miteva 9 Asts: Hodges 7		Pts: Ivezić 17; Rebs: Ivezić, Rezan 7 Asts: Lelas 7

Arena Samokov, Samokov
Attendance: 1,200
Referees: Panagiotis Anastopoulos (GRE), Ciprian Stoica (ROU), Gellért Kapitány (HUN)

11 June 2014
19:00

Boxscore

Croatia	76–73	Israel
Scoring by quarter: 23–20, 14–19, 18–18, 21–16
Pts: Ivezić 18; Rebs: Lelas 6 Asts: Ivezić, Mišura 5		Pts: Cohen 20; Rebs: Epstein, Fleischer 3 Asts: Cohen 6

Sportska dvorana Vijuš, Slavonski Brod
Attendance: 200
Referees: Paolo Taurino (ITA), Bernard Vassallo (MLT), Peter Papp (HUN)

15 June 2014
19:05

Boxscore

Israel	71–68	Bulgaria
Scoring by quarter: 14–22, 22–11, 17–13, 18–22
Pts: Doron 20; Rebs: Shafir 6 Asts: Cohen 5		Pts: Dimitrova 22; Rebs: Miteva 9 Asts: Peteva 6

Shalom Zisman Municipal Sports Arena, Ramat Gan
Attendance: 1,000
Referees: Sergiy Chebyshev (UKR), Alexander Romanov (RUS), Gavin Williams (WAL)

18 June 2014
19:00

Boxscore

Croatia	78–51	Bulgaria
Scoring by quarter: 24–14, 16–12, 19–15, 19–10
Pts: Ivanković 20; Rebs: Mazić, Ivanković 7 Asts: Ivezić 5		Pts: Hodges 16; Rebs: Miteva 5 Asts: Hodges, Tomova 3

Sportska dvorana Vijuš, Slavonski Brod
Attendance: 200
Referees: Fabiana Martinescu (ROU), Elena Chernova (RUS), Özlem Yalman (TUR)

22 June 2014
19:05

Boxscore

Israel	56–83	Croatia
Scoring by quarter: 18–26, 20–14, 14–23, 4–20
Pts: Shafir 14; Rebs: Epstein 4 Asts: five players 2		Pts: Ivanković 17; Rebs: Mazić 9 Asts: Mišura 6

Shalom Zisman Municipal Sports Arena, Ramat Gan
Attendance: 1,000
Referees: Christos Christodoulou (GRE), Konstantin Simonow (GER), Alexey Davydov (RUS)

25 June 2014
17:30

Boxscore

Bulgaria	75–70	Israel
Scoring by quarter: 17–18, 16–10, 23–24, 19–18
Pts: Tomova 20; Rebs: Miteva 9 Asts: Hodges 5		Pts: Doron 23; Rebs: Levitsky 7 Asts: Cohen 10

Arena Samokov, Samokov
Attendance: 500
Referees: Emin Moğulkoç (TUR), Alija Ferevski (MKD), Alin Faur (ROU)

=== Ranking of second-placed teams ===
The five best second-placed teams from the groups qualified for the final tournament. As some groups contain four and other only three teams, the results against the fourth-placed teams were removed.

Team	Pld	W	L	PF	PA	PD	Pts
Ukraine	4	3	1	303	248	+55	7
Sweden	4	3	1	253	213	+40	7
Poland	4	3	1	263	251	+12	7
Italy	4	2	2	259	244	+15	6
Great Britain	4	2	2	254	270	−16	6
Bulgaria	4	1	3	259	288	−29	5
