= Santuzza =

Santuzza may refer to:

- A character in Pietro Mascagni's 1890 opera Cavalleria rusticana
- A local nickname for Saint Rosalia (1130–1166), patron saint of Palermo, Sicily, Italy
- Santuzza, Missouri, an unincorporated community in Lewis County, Missouri, U.S.
- Santuzza (moth), a genus of the family Lecithoceridae

== See also ==
- Santina
- Santucci
- In the Garden of Papa Santuzzu, a 1999 novel by Tony Ardizzone
