= In the Name of the Father (disambiguation) =

In the Name of the Father is a 1993 film directed by Jim Sheridan about the Guildford Four.

In the Name of the Father may also refer to:

- In the Name of the Father (2006 film), an Iranian film by Ebrahim Hatamikia
- In the Name of the Father (album), an album by Altar
- In the Name of the Father (novel), a 1978 novel by Tony Ardizzone
- "In the Name of the Father" (song), by President from King of Terrors, 2025
- "In the Name of the Father", a song from the 1995 Black Grape album It's Great When You're Straight...Yeah
- "In the Name of the Father", a song from the 2003 Jay Chou album Yeh Hui-Mei
- "In the Name of the Father" (It: Welcome to Derry), an episode of the first season of It: Welcome to Derry

== See also ==
- Trinitarian formula, which begins with the words "In the name of the Father"
- In the Name of My Father – The Zepset – Live from Electric Ladyland, a 1997 album by The Jason Bonham Band
- Name of the Father, a psychoanalytic concept
- In the Name of the Führer, a 1977 Belgian documentary film
