= The Evening News (short story collection) =

1986 book by Tony Ardizzone

- First edition
- Author: Tony Ardizzone
- Language: English
- Publisher: University of Georgia Press
- Publication date: 1986
- ISBN: 0-8203-0860-9 (first edition)
- Dewey Decimal: 813.54
- LC Class: PS3551.R395 E9

The Evening News is Tony Ardizzone's first collection of stories, and winner of the Flannery O'Connor Award for Short Fiction. The collection is a small press book published in 1986 by the University of Georgia Press.

== Themes ==
Set mostly in Chicago's blue-collar neighborhoods, these stories focus on subjects that are common concerns or interests, such as: disease and death, vandalism and sacrilege, rape and infidelity, Catholicism, baseball, and lost love.

== Contents ==
- My Mother's Stories first appeared in Black Warrior Review

A son resolves his mounting grief over his mother's imminent death by recalling the stories she has told all her life.

- The Eyes of the Children first appeared in Beloit Fiction Journal

Gino, an adolescent, believes two of his classmates have seen Christ. Later, he questions his faith.

- The Evening News first appeared in Epoch

A husband, a former activist during the sixties, and a wife, a former believer in reincarnation and tarot, look at their pasts in light of the news stories they watch on television each evening, and question whether they should bring a child into the world.

- My Father's Laugh first appeared in Black Warrior Review

A young man teetering on the brink of adulthood, finally finds hope and reassurance from the remembered sound of his bus-driver father's laugh.

- The Daughter and the Tradesman first appeared in The Texas Quarterly

A young girl is raped by her boyfriend.

- Idling first appeared in Carolina Quarterly

A young man drives past his old girlfriend's house and recalls their time together and how he interacted with her family.

- The Transplant

A man gardens and attempts to connect with a new home.

- The Intersection first appeared in The Minnesota Review

Young adults involved in a peaceful wartime protest are beaten by the police.

- World Without End first appeared in Memphis State Review

Peter picks his Catholic, Italian American parents up from the airport and drives them around in his pickup. He pretends to be searching for the church he claims to attend, though he is lying.

- The Walk-On first appeared in Quartet

A bartender and former varsity pitcher for the University of Illinois Fighting Illini finds the actual events of the most cataclysmic day in his past unequal to their impact on his life and so rewrites them in his mind, adding an ill-placed banana peel, a falling meteor, and a careening truck in order to create a more fitting climax and finally to leave those memories behind him.

- Nonna first appeared in Epoch

An elderly widow walking the streets of the once-flourishing Italian neighborhood around Taylor Street on Chicago's Near West Side. To those around her she appears doddering, maybe crazy, but she doesn't see herself that way at all. The old lady's mind wanders as she confronts the changes in the place and the people. She flashes back to what the area was like before the mayor allowed the university to take over the land and force the shopkeepers to take flight.

== Reviews ==
"Ardizzone's detached tone and fine eye for significant details bring his characters and their emotions alive. Lovers of short fiction should look forward to more of his work." -Joan Mooney of St. Petersburg Times

"These are tough, menacing stories in which fate and memory exercise their Hardylike sway, all narrated in a variety of inventive and accomplished voices." -Tom Dowling of the San Francisco Examiner

"Ardizzone's stories also have a political bite to them, adding a deepened dimension, a fuller realization to his characters and giving them a particular social context often missing in other young writers." -David E. Anderson from The Seattle Times
