= Larabi's Ox: Stories of Morocco =

First edition

Larabi's Ox: Stories of Morocco by Tony Ardizzone is a collection of linked short stories. Published in 1992 by the small press Milkweed Editions, the collection is the Winner of the Milkweed National Fiction Prize, the Friends of Literature's Chicago Foundation Award for Fiction, the Pushcart Prize, and a National Endowment for the Arts Fellowship in Fiction

== Plot ==
Henry Goodson, dying of cancer, goes to Morocco to escape the horror of an American institutionalized death. Goodson hopes to finally grasp a moment of his own creation, independent of the mundane demands of his work-shaped life. Sarah Rosen's purpose in Morocco is to demonstrate her self-reliance in the aftermath of a failed relationship. The third central character, Peter Corvino, is an embittered academic hoping to revive his career through an exchange program to a Moroccan university. Morocco is strange, mysterious, colorful; the clash and interconnection between these travelers and the Islamic culture are the fabric of the collection.

== Contents ==
- Larabi's Ox first appeared in Prairie Schooner
- The Beggars first appeared in Shenandoah
- The Unfinished Minaret first appeared in The Gettysburg Review
- In the Garden of Djinn first appeared in Ploughshares
- Exchange first appeared in High Plains Literary Review
- The Whore of Fez el Bali first appeared in The Georgia Review
- Expatriates first appeared in Black Warrior Review
- Sons of Adam first appeared in The Agni Review
- The Surrender first appeared in Prairie Schooner
- The Hand of Fatima first appeared in Witness
- Postcard from Ouarzazate first appeared in The Gettysburg Review
- The Fire-Eater first appeared in Beloit Fiction Journal
- Valley of the Draa first appeared in Sonora Review
- The Baraka of Beggars and Kings first appeared in Shenandoah

== Reviews ==
"Tony Ardizzone achieves an intriguingly prismatic effect in his second collection of short fiction, Larabi's Ox, by tracking three Americans traveling simultaneously but independently in Morocco. Each of the main characters who figure in these 14 stories visits North Africa for a different reason. For Peter Corvino, the trip is a respite from the monotony of tenure-track academia; for Sarah Rosen, it's a test of her self-sufficiency after a failed romance; and for the cancer-afflicted Henry Goodson, Morocco is a place to die. Although they share a bus ride in the title story, the three never meet.

Mr. Ardizzone—who has taught at Mohammed V University in Rabat, Morocco, and has traveled in that country - walks this trio through the classic Moroccan rites of passage, from the inevitable onslaught of self-appointed guides for foreigners to the labyrinthine formalities involved in the purchase of a rug. But it's through their curiously affecting relationships with the locals that they find what they blindly came to seek. In "The Surrender," the disaffected Peter discovers new meaning in teaching by taking two young beggars under his wing. In "The Fire-Eater," Sarah reaches a point where "her life could be more her own" after asserting herself sexually with a Moroccan man. Disappointingly, Henry remains stubbornly, if colorfully, one-dimensional.

Because of Mr. Ardizzone's cumulative approach to storytelling—his deliberate style drags at times—these vignettes work better as a group than individually. But his use of shifting perspectives is an effective device. His willingness to penetrate Moroccan culture, rather than paint it as an exotic backdrop for expatriate adventures, makes this collection, which won the 1992 Milkweed National Fiction Prize, refreshingly original." --- New York Times Book Review

"Larabi's Ox places Tony Ardizzone in our first rank of story writers. His range is wide enough to embrace man and beast, infidel and Muslim, the fallen and the saved; his empathy is such that he immediately makes compelling any character that appears. These are wise stories, memorably told, beautifully written." -- W. D. Wetherell

"Ardizzone has gone into an alien land, taken it on its own terms, and captured the essence of the place -- the smells, the rhythms, the colors, the philosophy. Some writers deal with the foreign by making it familiar; Ardizzone has somehow kept it foreign, and so allows us to see what connects and what doesn't. When he's done, the place is at it is -- it is we who are different." -- David Bradley

"Vibrant, absorbing, and ingenious as a fine collage, Larabi's Ox is a collection of superb stories, and far more. Tony Ardizzone's stunning portrait of Morocco is a grave and intricate riddle whose answers reveal the soul of human striving. Look into these memorable characters and you will encounter your essential self."—Susan Dodd
