= Taking it Home: Stories from the Neighborhood =

Short-story collection by Tony Ardizzone

Taking it Home: Stories from the Neighborhood is the third collection by Tony Ardizzone. Published in 1996 by the University of Illinois Press Sunsinger Books. It was a finalist for the Paterson Fiction Prize. Of the twelve stories included, six were previously published in the author's first collection, The Evening News.

== Contents ==
- "Baseball Fever"

"*Nonna" (also appeared in The Evening News)

- "The Eyes of the Children" (also appeared in The Evening News)
- "My Mother's Stories" (also appeared in The Evening News)
- "Rituals"
- "The Language of the Dead"
- "The Man in the Movie"
- "The Daughter and the Tradesman" (also appeared in The Evening News)
- "World Without End" (also appeared in The Evening News)
- "Ladies' Choice"
- "Idling" (also appeared in The Evening News)
- "Holy Cards"

== Reviews ==
"These tales of an Italian-American neighborhood on Chicago's North Side during the 1950s and '60s go further than the usual picturesque ethnic memoir, with Ardizzone (Larbai's Ox) taking them that extra step through added complexity and carefully chosen language...All these stories distinguish themselves through empathetic portrayals of unexceptional people described in exceptional language." -- Publishers Weekly

"Tony Ardizzone's neighborhood is the North Side of Chicago and, more specifically, the Italian Catholic neighborhoods that flourished there in the 1950s and 1960s. In a dozen highly polished tales, Ardizzone describes a world that revolves around the church, the family, and work, in that order...Ardizzone's characters are no strangers to tragedy, physical violence, or prejudice, but he writes about them from an attitude of affection, not anger or regret. These stories will have an appeal far beyond the 'friendly confines'." -- Booklist

"These stories by Tony Ardizzone are distinguished by a quality that I have long admired in his writing: the solid way his fiction is grounded in the American experience. Ardizzone is a writer who writes out of love rather than anger or contempt, and his emotional palette is fittingly broad. Yet his great affection for his subjects never blinds him to the tough realities and inequalities of life on American streets; rather, it leads him to gaze more intently and to see deeper." -- Stuart Dybek, author of The Coast of Chicago
