= Kristi Toliver =

American-Slovak basketball player and coach (born 1987)

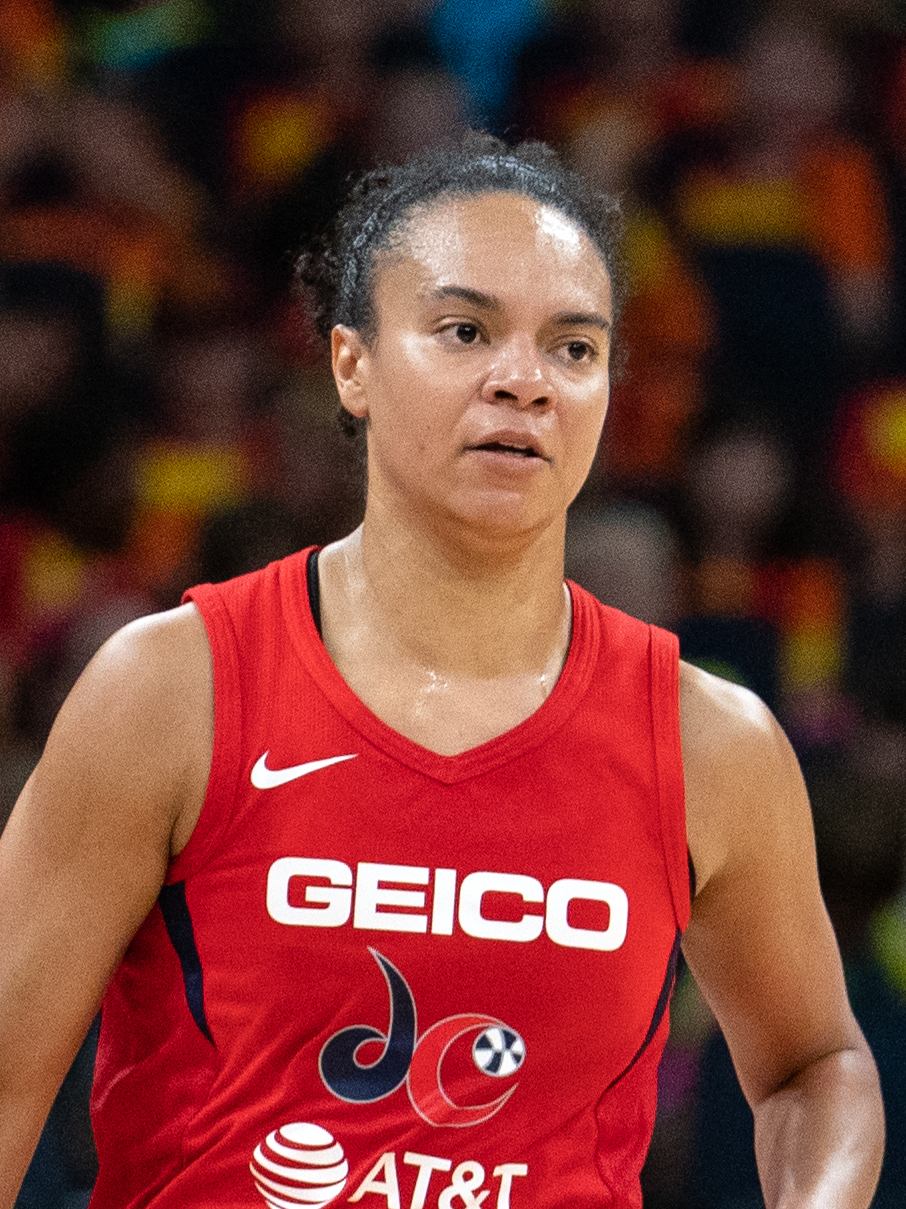
- Toliver with the Washington Mystics in 2019

Phoenix Mercury
- Title: Associate head coach
- League: WNBA

Personal information
- Born: January 27, 1987 (age 39) Harrisonburg, Virginia, U.S.
- Listed height: 5 ft 7 in (1.70 m)
- Listed weight: 130 lb (59 kg)

Career information
- High school: Harrisonburg (Harrisonburg, Virginia)
- College: Maryland (2005–2009)
- WNBA draft: 2009: 1st round, 3rd overall pick
- Drafted by: Chicago Sky
- Playing career: 2009–2023
- Position: Point guard / shooting guard
- Coaching career: 2018–present

Career history

Playing
- 2009: Chicago Sky
- 2009–2010: Raanana Hertzeliya
- 2010: MKB Euroleasing Sopron
- 2010–2016: Los Angeles Sparks
- 2010–2011: Samsun Canik Belediyesi
- 2011–2014: Dynamo Moscow
- 2014–2018: UMMC Ekaterinburg
- 2017–2019: Washington Mystics
- 2021–2022: Los Angeles Sparks
- 2023: Washington Mystics

Coaching
- 2018–2020: Washington Wizards (assistant)
- 2021–2023: Dallas Mavericks (assistant)
- 2024–present: Phoenix Mercury (associate head coach)

Career highlights
- 2× WNBA champion (2016, 2019); All-WNBA Second Team (2012); 3× WNBA All-Star (2013, 2018, 2019); WNBA Most Improved Player (2012); 4× Russian National League champion (2015–2018); Russian Cup winner (2017); 2× EuroLeague champion (2016, 2018); 3× Europe SuperCup winner (2013, 2014, 2018); 2× EuroCup winner (2013, 2014); NCAA champion (2006); Nancy Lieberman Award (2008); 2× All-American – State Farm Coaches', USBWA (2008, 2009); First-team All-American – AP (2009); Second-team All-American – AP (2008); ACC Player of the Year (2009); 2× First-team All-ACC (2008, 2009); ACC All-Freshman Team (2006); McDonald's All-American (2005)
- Stats at WNBA.com
- Stats at Basketball Reference

Kristi Renee Toliver (born January 27, 1987) is an American-Slovak professional basketball coach and former player. As of 2024 she is the associate head coach for the Phoenix Mercury of the Women's National Basketball Association (WNBA).

Toliver played college basketball for the Maryland Terrapins, where she won an championship in 2006. In the 2009 WNBA draft, she was drafted 3rd overall by the Chicago Sky. She played most of her 14-year WNBA career with the Los Angeles Sparks and the Washington Mystics, winning a championship with each team in 2016 and 2019. During her 10-year international playing career, she won four consecutive Russian Women's Basketball Premier League championships with UMMC Ekaterinburg.

While still a player with the Mystics, she was an assistant coach for the Washington Wizards of the men's National Basketball Association (NBA). After a stint as an assistant coach for the Dallas Mavericks of the NBA, she was hired as associate head coach for the Mercury in 2024.

== Early life and career ==
Toliver was born in Harrisonburg, Virginia to George Toliver and Peggy Toliver. Her father is a former NBA referee. Kristi graduated from Harrisonburg High School in 2005. During her high school career, Toliver was named a McDonald's All-American, Women's Basketball Coaches Association (WBCA) All-American, Parade All-American, EA Sports All-American, and USA Today All-USA Basketball Team member. She was also the Virginia State Gatorade Player of the Year and Virginia Ms. Basketball. She participated in the 2005 WBCA High School All-America Game and 2005 McDonald's All-American Game.

== College career ==
A standout player from the University of Maryland, Toliver was known for her ability to perform under pressure. In the 2006 National Championship game, Toliver, then a freshman, hit a game-tying three-pointer with only seconds remaining to force overtime against favored Duke, leading to a Maryland win and the school's first national championship in women's basketball.

== Professional career ==
=== WNBA ===
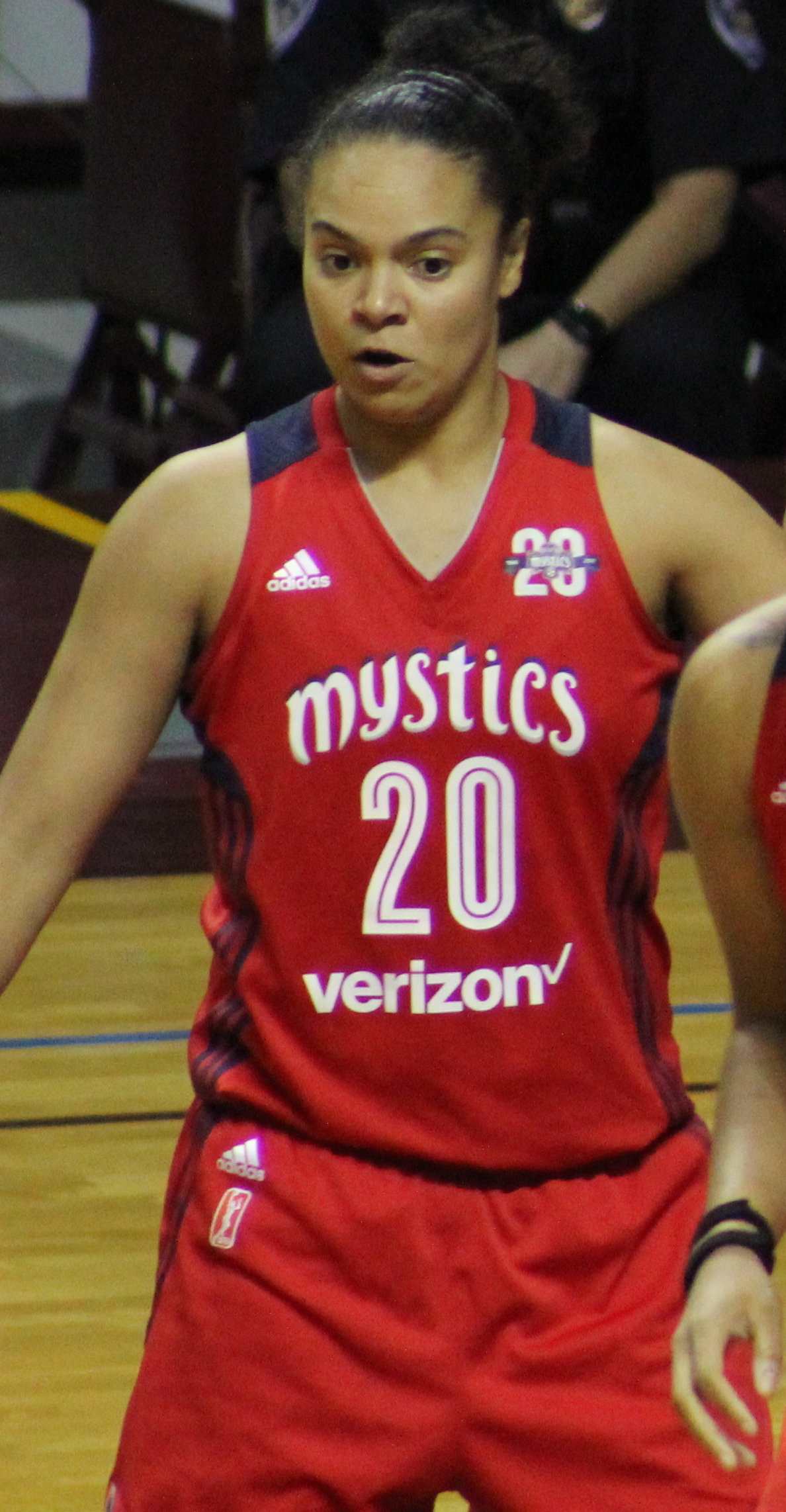
Toliver during the 2017 WNBA Semifinals

==== Chicago Sky (2009) ====
In the 2009 WNBA draft, the Chicago Sky selected Toliver with the third pick. In her rookie season with the Sky, Toliver came off the bench averaging 7.6 points per game in 27 games and ranked second in the league in three-point shooting. As a rookie, Toliver signed an endorsement deal with Nike.

==== Los Angeles Sparks (2010–2016) ====
Toliver was traded to the Los Angeles Sparks just before the start of the 2010 season in exchange for a 2011 second round draft pick.

In her first season with the Sparks, Toliver was the backup point guard on the roster behind Ticha Penicheiro. She averaged 8.6 points per game in 34 games.

In the 2012 season with the departure of Penicheiro, Toliver became the starting point guard for the Sparks and had a breakout season. In the month of May, Toliver hit a game winning 3-pointer at the buzzer against the Tulsa Shock. She was the Western Conference Player of the Month for August, averaged a career-high 17.5 points per game, was ranked 9th in three-point field goal percentage, was named to the All-WNBA Second Team and won the WNBA Most Improved Player Award. Her offensive performance continued in the playoffs, where she averaged 20 points per game in 4 games. The Sparks were eventually eliminated in a 2-game sweep by the Minnesota Lynx in the conference finals.

In 2013, Toliver re-signed with the Sparks to a multi-year deal once her rookie contract with the Sky expired. With the acquisition of Lindsey Harding, Toliver became the starting shooting guard for the Sparks. During the season, Toliver was named a WNBA All-Star for the first time in her career, while averaging 14.1 points per game in all 34 games.

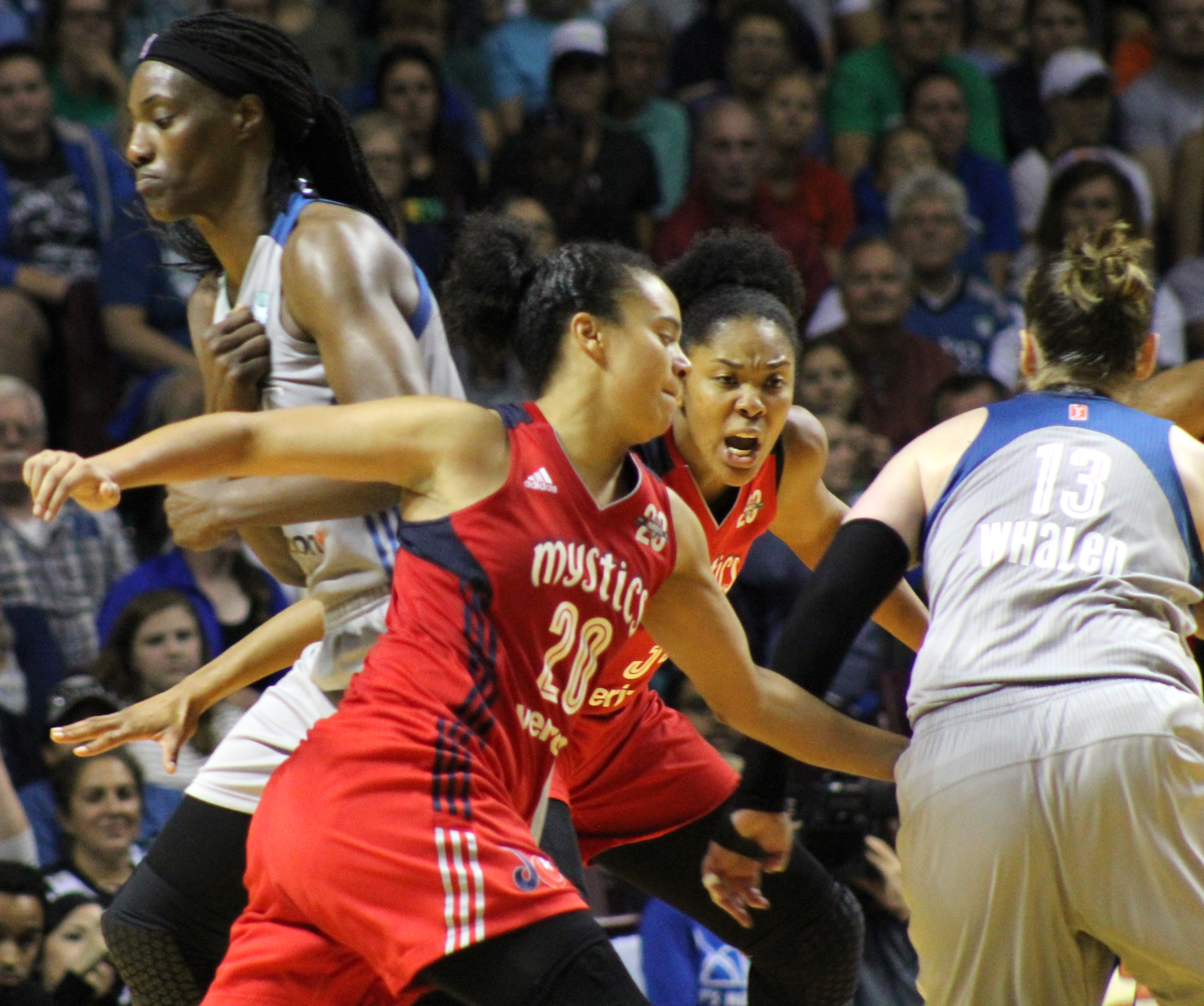
Toliver attempts a steal from Lindsay Whalen in 2017

During the 2015 season, Toliver was assigned back to the point guard position after Harding was waived. In a regular season game win against the Tulsa Shock, Toliver set a Sparks scoring franchise record with 43 points, surpassing Lisa Leslie's 41 points. She finished the season averaging 12.4 points per game.

In the 2016 season, the Sparks finished 26–8 with the second seed, and defeated Chicago 3–1 in the conference semi-finals. Toliver was ranked 4th in three-point field goal percentage while averaging 13.2 points per game during the regular season. On June 24, 2016, Toliver scored a season-high 25 points along with 7 three-pointers in a regular season game win against the Minnesota Lynx. With a supporting cast of Candace Parker and Nneka Ogwumike, Toliver won her first WNBA championship with the Sparks as they defeated the Minnesota Lynx 3–2 in the Finals.

Toliver is currently the Sparks franchise leader in three-point field goal percentage and free-throw percentage.

==== Washington Mystics (2017–2019) ====
In February 2017, Toliver signed with the Washington Mystics in free agency. On May 14, 2017, Toliver made her debut for the Mystics, scoring 8 points along with 4 assists in an 89–74 victory over the San Antonio Stars. On July 19, 2017, with Tayler Hill and Elena Delle Donne sidelined with injuries, Toliver scored a season-high 29 points while hitting 7 three-pointers in a 100–96 overtime win against the Atlanta Dream after coming back from a 21-point deficit. The Mystics secured a playoff berth as the number 6 seed in the league with an 18–16 record. In the first-round elimination game, the Mystics defeated the Dallas Wings 86–76 with Toliver scoring 16 points. In the second round elimination game, the Mystics advanced to the semi-finals after defeating the number 3-seeded New York Liberty, 82–68, making it the first time in franchise history where the Mystics had advanced past the second round. Toliver scored 32 points in the win while scoring 17 of them in the third quarter and made a WNBA-record 9 three-pointers. In the semi-finals, the Mystics were defeated by the Minnesota Lynx in a 3-game sweep.

On May 30, 2018, Toliver scored a season-high 30 points in a 103–95 victory against the Phoenix Mercury. Later on in the 2018 season, Toliver was voted into the 2018 WNBA All-Star Game, making it her second all-star appearance. Toliver finished off the season with 13.9 points per game with career-highs in free throw shooting and minutes. The Mystics finished as the number three seed in the league with a 22–12 record, receiving a bye to the second round elimination game. They defeated the Los Angeles Sparks 96–64, advancing to the semi-finals for the second year in a row. In the semi-finals, they defeated the Atlanta Dream in five games, advancing to the WNBA Finals for the first time in franchise history. The Mystics were swept in the Finals against the Seattle Storm.

On July 24, 2019, Toliver scored a season-high 32 points in a 79–71 victory over the Minnesota Lynx. Toliver was voted into the WNBA All-Star game, making it her third all-star appearance. A few weeks after the all-star break, Toliver injured her knee and missed the rest of the regular season. Despite her injury, the Mystics finished as the number 1 seed in the league with a 26–8 record, receiving a double-bye to the semi-finals. Toliver returned from injury in the playoffs for Game 1 off the bench against the Las Vegas Aces in the semi-finals, helping the Mystics gain a 1–0 lead. She continued to be on minutes restriction for the duration of the series until Game 4. The Mystics defeated the Aces 3–1 to advance to the WNBA Finals for the second year in a row. Against the Connecticut Sun, the Mystics won the WNBA Finals in five games, earning Toliver her second WNBA championship.

==== Second stint with Sparks (2020–2022) ====
In February 2020, Toliver returned to the Sparks in free agency on a three-year deal. However, in June 2020, she would opt to not play in the 2020 WNBA season due to health concerns surrounding the COVID-19 pandemic. Without Toliver, the Sparks finished as the number 3 seed with a 15–7 record in the shortened 22-game season, receiving a bye to the second round, but would end up getting eliminated by the Connecticut Sun in the second round elimination game.

=== International career ===
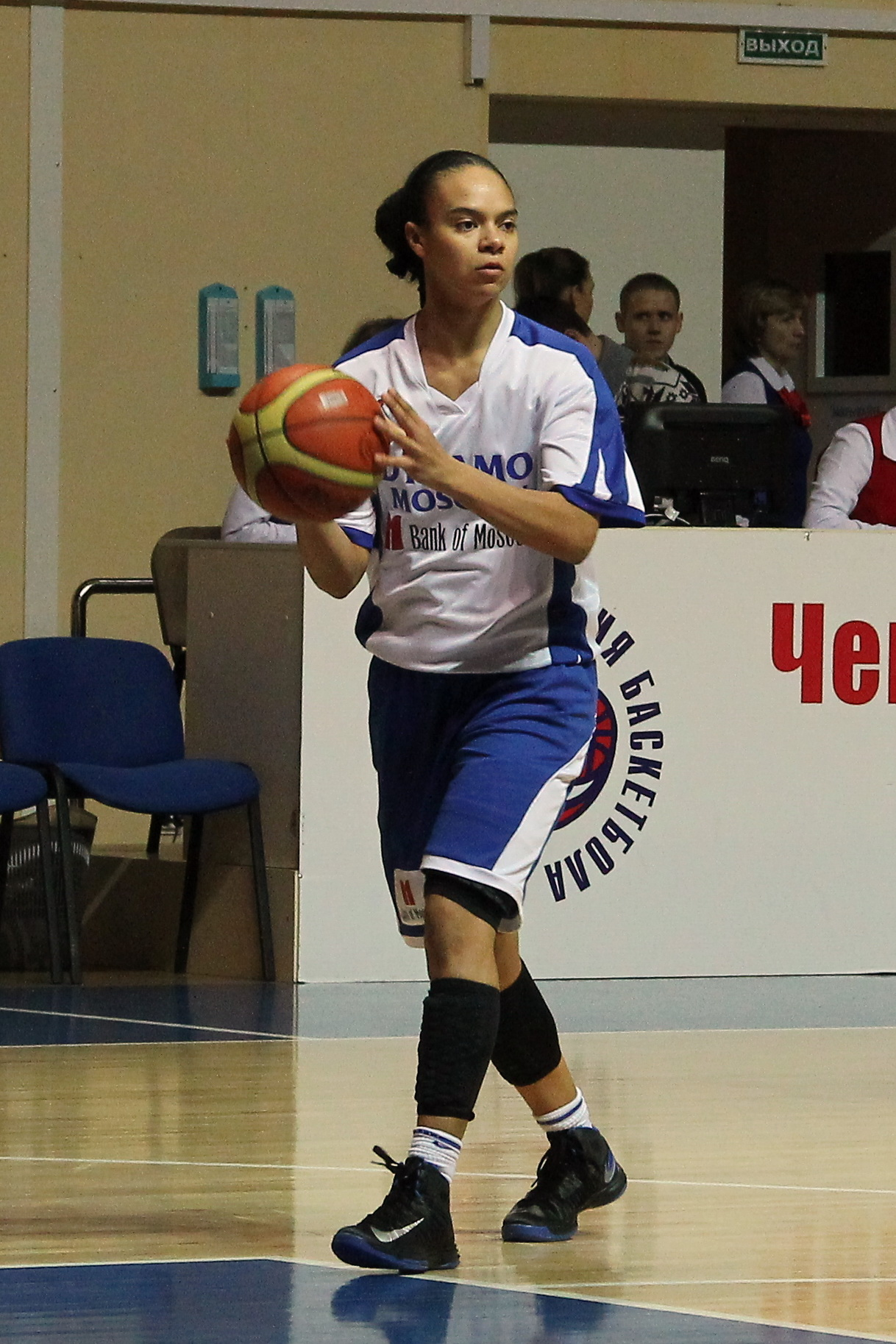
Toliver playing in Moscow, 2013

In the 2009–10 off-season, Toliver spent the first portion of the off-season in Israel playing for Raanana Hertzeliya. In the second portion of the off-season, Toliver played in Hungary for MKB Euroleasing Sopron. In the 2010–11 off-season, Toliver played in Turkey for Samsun Canik Belediyesi. From 2011 to 2014, Toliver played three off-seasons in Russia for Dynamo Moscow, winning back-to-back championships with the team in 2013 and 2014.

Toliver was a member of the Slovakia women's national basketball team in the EuroBasket Women 2015 qualification tournament in 2014 after receiving her Slovak citizenship. The team finished first place in Group A to qualify for the EuroBasket Women 2015 tournament, where they finished 9th place with a 3–4 record, missing out on a spot in the Olympic qualifying tournament for the 2016 Summer Olympics.

From 2014 to 2016, Toliver has played for UMMC Ekaterinburg in Russia for two off-seasons and had won back-to-back championships with the team in 2015 and 2016. Toliver played with teammate, Candace Parker in her first-offseason with the team. As of August 2016, Toliver had re-signed with UMMC Ekaterinburg for the 2016–17 off-season and won her third consecutive championship with the team. In 2017, Toliver re-signed again with UMMC Ekaterinburg for the 2017–18 off-season and won her fourth consecutive Russian League championship with the team.

== Coaching career ==
On October 16, 2018, Toliver became a full-time assistant coach for the Washington Wizards. She was the first active WNBA player to coach in the NBA. On August 19, 2021, Toliver reached a deal to become an assistant coach for the Dallas Mavericks. The Phoenix Mercury named Toliver an associate head coach on December 1, 2023.

== Career statistics ==
=== College ===
| Year | Team | GP | GS | MPG | FG% | 3P% | FT% | RPG | APG | SPG | BPG | PPG |
|---|---|---|---|---|---|---|---|---|---|---|---|---|
| 2005–06 | Maryland | 33 | 24 | 28.8 | .407 | .404 | **.891** | 2.6 | 4.4 | 0.7 | 0.2 | 11.6 |
| 2006–07 | Maryland | 34 | 32 | 26.7 | **.490** | **.447** | .877 | 2.4 | 4.7 | 1.1 | 0.1 | 12.3 |
| 2007–08 | Maryland | **37** | **37** | 34.4 | .444 | .371 | .860 | **3.4** | **7.4** | **1.5** | 0.1 | 17.1 |
| 2008–09 | Maryland | 35 | 35 | **35.1** | .449 | .416 | .857 | 3.2 | 4.9 | 1.3 | **0.3** | **18.4** |
| Career | | 139 | 128 | 31.4 | .447 | .408 | .866 | 2.9 | 5.4 | 1.1 | 0.2 | 15.0 |

=== WNBA ===
Legend
| GP | Games played | GS | Games started | MPG | Minutes per game | RPG | Rebounds per game |
| APG | Assists per game | SPG | Steals per game | BPG | Blocks per game | PPG | Points per game |
| TO | Turnovers per game | FG% | Field-goal percentage | 3P% | 3-point field-goal percentage | FT% | Free-throw percentage |
| **Bold** | Career best | ° | League leader |

| † | Denotes seasons in which Toliver won a WNBA championship |

==== Regular season ====
| Year | Team | GP | GS | MPG | FG% | 3P% | FT% | RPG | APG | SPG | BPG | TO | PPG |
|---|---|---|---|---|---|---|---|---|---|---|---|---|---|
| 2009 | Chicago | 27 | 0 | 14.3 | .453 | **.444** | .913 | 1.4 | 1.9 | 0.4 | 0.1 | 1.6 | 7.6 |
| 2010 | Los Angeles | **34** | 0 | 20.7 | .438 | .349 | .815 | 2.2 | 1.3 | 0.6 | 0.1 | 1.4 | 8.6 |
| 2011 | Los Angeles | 32 | 17 | 23.6 | .423 | .427 | .907 | 1.9 | 2.9 | 0.7 | 0.0 | 2.0 | 11.2 |
| 2012 | Los Angeles | **34** | 33 | 31.5 | .491 | .424 | .901 | **3.2** | 4.9 | **1.3** | 0.1 | 3.6 | **17.5** |
| 2013 | Los Angeles | **34** | **34** | 30.0 | .457 | .383 | .831 | 2.6 | 3.4 | **1.3** | 0.1 | 1.9 | 14.1 |
| 2014 | Los Angeles | 27 | 21 | 28.5 | .442 | .393 | .843 | 2.1 | 4.1 | 1.1 | 0.0 | 1.7 | 11.8 |
| 2015 | Los Angeles | 28 | 28 | 30.9 | .449 | .384 | .903 | 2.3 | 3.7 | 0.8 | 0.0 | 2.2 | 12.4 |
| 2016^{†} | Los Angeles | 33 | 33 | 32.1 | .426 | .424 | .889 | 2.6 | 3.7 | 0.8 | 0.0 | 1.3 | 13.2 |
| 2017 | Washington | **34** | **34** | 29.1 | .407 | .338 | .867 | 2.0 | 3.4 | 0.6 | **0.2** | 1.8 | 11.9 |
| 2018 | Washington | 33 | 33 | **33.0** | .433 | .360 | **.918** | 2.3 | 4.4 | 1.2 | 0.0 | 2.1 | 13.9 |
| 2019^{†} | Washington | 23 | 23 | 29.5 | **.494** | .360 | .857 | 2.9 | **6.0** | 1.1 | 0.0 | 2.0 | 13.0 |
| 2021 | Los Angeles | 19 | 19 | 27.6 | .414 | .337 | .842 | 1.5 | 2.8 | 0.7 | 0.0 | 1.7 | 9.4 |
| 2022 | Los Angeles | 11 | 10 | 19.8 | .373 | .361 | .875 | 0.8 | 3.1 | 0.4 | 0.0 | 2.3 | 5.9 |
| 2023 | Washington | 11 | 0 | 9.0 | .333 | .357 | .800 | 0.7 | 0.7 | 0.3 | 0.0 | **0.6** | 3.6 |
| Career | 14 years, 3 teams | 380 | 289 | 26.9 | .443 | .383 | .879 | 2.2 | 3.4 | 0.9 | 0.1 | 2.0 | 11.8 |

==== Postseason ====
| Year | Team | GP | GS | MPG | FG% | 3P% | FT% | RPG | APG | SPG | BPG | TO | PPG |
|---|---|---|---|---|---|---|---|---|---|---|---|---|---|
| 2010 | Los Angeles | 2 | 0 | 22.5 | **.545** | **.600** | **1.000** | 0.0 | 4.0 | 0.5 | 0.0 | 3.0 | 8.0 |
| 2012 | Los Angeles | 4 | 4 | 34.3 | .527 | .417 | .850 | 3.0 | 1.8 | 0.8 | 0.2 | 3.7 | **20.0** |
| 2013 | Los Angeles | 3 | 3 | 30.3 | .289 | .063 | **1.000** | **4.0** | 3.0 | **2.0** | 0.3 | 1.6 | 10.7 |
| 2014 | Los Angeles | 2 | 2 | 32.5 | .409 | .111 | .667 | 1.5 | **6.5** | 0.5 | 0.0 | 2.0 | 10.5 |
| 2015 | Los Angeles | 3 | 3 | 29.5 | .367 | .385 | .750 | 1.7 | 3.0 | 1.0 | 0.0 | 2.3 | 10.0 |
| 2016^{†} | Los Angeles | **9** | **9** | 32.3 | .405 | .414 | .852 | 2.0 | 3.0 | 1.4 | 0.1 | **1.4** | 12.8 |
| 2017 | Washington | 5 | 5 | 31.9 | .375 | .405 | **1.000** | 2.4 | 4.2 | 0.8 | **0.4** | 2.4 | 17.8 |
| 2018 | Washington | **9** | **9** | **36.7** | .388 | .234 | .842 | 2.6 | 4.4 | 1.1 | 0.0 | 2.3 | 13.9 |
| 2019^{†} | Washington | **9** | 6 | 31.8 | .436 | .396 | .875 | 1.7 | 5.2 | 0.2 | 0.0 | 2.2 | 14.2 |
| Career | 9 years, 2 teams | 46 | 41 | 32.5 | .406 | .337 | .870 | 2.2 | 3.9 | 0.9 | 0.1 | 2.2 | 13.8 |

=== Honors ===
- National Champion (2005–06)
- ACC Champion (2008–09)
- ACC Player of the Year (2008–09)
- ACC Preseason Player of the Year (2009)
- Preseason Wade Trophy Candidate (2006–07, 2007–08, 2008–09)
- State Farm Wade Trophy Finalist (2007–08, 2008–09)
- Preseason Naismith Award Candidate (2006–07, 2007–08, 2008–09)
- Midseason Naismith Award Candidate (2007–08, 2008–09)
- Wooden Award Preseason Candidate (2007–08, 2008–09)
- Wooden Award Midseason Candidate (2007–08, 2008–09)
- Wooden Award Finalist (2007–08, 2008–09)
- WBCA All-American (2008, 2009)
- Associated Press All-American 2nd team (2008)
- Associated Press All-American 1st team (2009)
- Associated Press Preseason All-American (2009)
- USBWA All-American (2008, 2009)
- Wooden Award All-American Team (2009)
- Sports Illustrated All-American 1st Team (2008)
- ESPN.com Second Team All-American (2008, 2009)
- CBSSportsline.com Second Team All-American (2008, 2009)
- Lowe's All-Senior All-American 1st Team (2009)
- Finalist for Lowe's Senior CLASS Award (2009)
- Nancy Lieberman Award winner (2008)
- Nancy Lieberman Award Finalist (2007, 2008, 2009)
- First Team All-ACC (2008, 2009)
- Third Team All-ACC (2007)
- Preseason WNIT Most Valuable Player (2007–08)
- Preseason WNIT Champion (2007–08)
- NCAA Final Four All-Tournament Team (2006)
- NCAA Albuquerque All-Tournament Team (2006)
- Terrapin Classic All-Tournament Team (2006)
- ACC All-Freshman Team (2006)
- ACC Player of the Week (November 19, 2007, 2/11/08)
- ACC Rookie of the Week (January 26, 2006, 2/6/06 [co])

== See also ==
- List of WNBA career 3-point scoring leaders
