= Heart of the Order =

1986 novel by Tony Ardizzone

- Author: Tony Ardizzone
- Language: English
- Publisher: Henry Holt and Company
- Publication date: 1986
- ISBN: 0-03-008503-9 (first edition)
- Dewey Decimal: 813.54
- LC Class: PS3551.R395 H4

Heart of the Order is a 1986 novel written by Tony Ardizzone. It was published by Henry Holt and Company and won the Virginia Prize for Fiction and named one of the 10 Best Sports Books 1986 by The National Sports Review.

== Plot ==
The main character, Danny "Kiss of the Wolf" Bacigalupo, a baseball player from Chicago's North Side with "blood on his bat." In an open letter to his son, Danny recaps his life and explains how an accidental death, guilt, Catholicism, amnesia, a good glove, a good level swing, and the love of a fat woman with beautiful eyes can shape a life. Profoundly influenced by the accidental death of a neighborhood kid during a ball game (one of Danny's line drives struck him in the Adam's apple), Danny "suffers" the schizophrenic presence of the dead boy throughout high school, the minor leagues, and major league baseball. Bacigalupo's story begins with a flippant, jocular tone; however, it quickly hits a comfortable, engaging stride, describing the thrills, agonies, and occasional epiphanies of growing up Catholic, Italian, poor, and naturally athletic.

== Reviews ==
"Ardizzone writes with razor-sharp beauty. There's an electricity, an excitement in his prose. Heart of the Order is upbeat but never trite, an honorable novel about love, decency, and redemption. As they say on the old diamond, Tony Ardizzone can play some". -John Hough Jr from The Philadelphia Inquirer

"The wisdom and humor of the novel's narrative voice and the stylistic risks that have transformed this straightforward story into art." - Novelist David Bradley, winner of 1982's PEN/Faulkner Award

"Ardizzone's nonstop stream of comic but revealing baseball metaphors elevates dugout chatter to something approaching poetry. This is one of the rare books that can make you laugh out loud, all the while scoring some serious points about the games that really matter." -John Harvey of Sports Illustrated
