= Tony Ardizzone =

American writer

- Born: Anthony V. Ardizzone; 1949 (age 76–77); Chicago, Illinois, U.S.
- Education: University of Illinois Urbana-Champaign; Bowling Green State University (MFA); University of Illinois at Chicago
- Occupations: Novelist; editor; college professor
- Writing career
- Notable works: In the Name of the Father (1978); Heart of the Order (1986); The Evening News (1986); Larabi's Ox: Stories of Morocco (1992); Taking it Home: Stories from the Neighborhood (1996); In the Garden of Papa Santuzzu (1999); The Whale Chaser (2015); The Arab's Ox: Stories of Morocco (2018); In Bruno's Shadow (2023)
- Notable awards: National Endowment for the Arts Fellowships (1985 and 1990); Flannery O'Connor Award for Short Fiction (1986); Milkweed Editions National Fiction Prize (1992); Chicago Foundation for Literature Award for Fiction (1992)
- Website: tonyardizzone.com

Anthony V. Ardizzone (born 1949) is an American novelist, short story writer, and editor. He is the author of eight fiction books, including five novels and three short-story collections.

== Early life and education ==
Ardizzone was born in 1949 and raised on the North Side of Chicago. He attended grammar school at Saint Gregory the Great parish and high school at Saint George, where he was taught by the Christian Brothers. His Italian American upbringing, particularly his family's Sicilian roots, later became a recurring subject in his fiction.

He earned a Bachelor of Arts in English from the University of Illinois at Urbana–Champaign in 1971, where he studied creative writing under J. Kerker Quinn, Daniel Curley, Paul Friedman, and George Scouffas. After a year of graduate study at the University of Illinois at Chicago, he completed a Master of Fine Arts in creative writing at Bowling Green State University in 1975, studying with Philip F. O'Connor, Robert Early, and John Clellon Holmes.

== Career ==
Early in his career, Ardizzone taught basic writing at Saint Mary's Center for Learning, an inner-city high school on Chicago's West Side, and freshman composition at Bowling Green State University. After the publication of his first novel, he joined the English department at Old Dominion University in Norfolk, Virginia, where he founded and directed the undergraduate creative writing program and earned tenure.

In 1985, Ardizzone taught at Mohammed V University in Rabat, Morocco, through a faculty exchange sponsored by the United States Information Agency. The residency later provided the basis for his collection Larabi's Ox: Stories of Morocco.

In 1987, Ardizzone joined Indiana University Bloomington and twice served as director of its Creative Writing Program. In 2006, he was named a Chancellor's Professor of English. He received the Tracy M. Sonneborn Award in 2005 and the Trustees Award for Teaching in 2012.

He also taught in the low-residency MFA program at Vermont College in Montpelier and served two terms on the board of directors of the Association of Writers & Writing Programs. He retired from Indiana University in 2013 and later lived in Portland, Oregon. He currently lives on Orcas Island in Washington.

== The Waxing the Floor metaphor ==
Ardizzone is also the originator of the "Wax The Floor" metaphor for fiction writing, which advises creative writing students to work in successive complete drafts. Just as a janitor wouldn't sweep, mop, wax and buff a single tile before moving to the next, students shouldn't polish individual paragraphs or chapters until the first draft is finished and "the entire picture laid out," as novelist John Updike once put it.

== Writing ==
=== Novels ===
Ardizzone's debut novel, In the Name of the Father, was published by Doubleday in 1978. Set on Chicago's North Side, the coming-of-age novel follows Tonto Schwartz, the son of an Italian mother and a Jewish father who dies when Tonto is an infant. Shortly after its publication, Ardizzone appeared on The Studs Terkel Program on WFMT Chicago.

His second novel, Heart of the Order, was published by Henry Holt and Company in 1986 and won the Virginia Prize for Fiction, an Individual Artist Fellowship from the National Endowment for the Arts, and was named one of the 10 Best Sports Books 1986 by the National Sports Review. The novel follows minor-league baseball player Danny "Kiss of the Wolf" Bacigalupo, whose life is shaped by a fatal boyhood accident.

His third novel, In the Garden of Papa Santuzzu, was published in hardcover by Picador USA/St. Martin's Press in 1999 and in paperback in 2000. Told through the alternating voices of seven siblings in a Sicilian family who emigrated to the United States in the early twentieth century, the novel incorporates Sicilian folktales and songs into its immigrant narrative.

The Whale Chaser, published in 2010 by Academy Chicago Publishers and reissued in paperback by Chicago Review Press in 2015, follows Vince Sansone from 1960s Chicago to Tofino, British Columbia, where he becomes a whale watching guide.

Ardizzone's fifth novel, In Bruno's Shadow, was published in 2023 by Guernica Editions as part of its Guernica World Editions series. Set in Rome against the backdrop of the 2004 Indian Ocean earthquake and tsunami and the final illness of Pope John Paul II, the novel follows a Croatian housekeeper named Dubravka and eight residents of a pensione near the statue of Giordano Bruno in the Campo de' Fiori.

=== Short-story collections ===
Ardizzone's first collection, The Evening News, won the 1985 Flannery O'Connor Award for Short Fiction and was published by the University of Georgia Press in 1986. The press reissued it in paperback in 2013 for the award's thirtieth anniversary. Set largely in Chicago's blue-collar neighborhoods, its eleven stories focus on second-generation Italian American, Catholic, and working-class characters.

His second collection, Larabi's Ox: Stories of Morocco, was published by Milkweed Editions in 1992 and won the Milkweed National Fiction Prize, judged that year by novelist Gloria Naylor, who also wrote the foreword. The book also received the Chicago Foundation for Literature Award for Fiction, a Pushcart Prize, the Lawrence Foundation Award in Fiction, and an Individual Artist Fellowship from the National Endowment for the Arts. The linked stories follow three Americans in Morocco whose experiences intersect with those of Moroccan characters. In 2018, Bordighera Press published a revised edition under the title The Arab's Ox: Stories of Morocco.

His third collection, Taking It Home: Stories from the Neighborhood, was published in 1996 by the University of Illinois Press under its Sunsinger Books imprint.

=== Editing ===
Ardizzone edited The Habit of Art: Best Stories from the Indiana University Fiction Workshop, published by Indiana University Press in 2005 to mark the twenty-fifth anniversary of Indiana University's MFA program. The anthology features work by twenty-one graduates of the program, including Brian Leung, Dana Johnson, and Renée Manfredi.

He also served as managing editor of three volumes of the AWP Intro anthology series and founded the organization's Intro Journals Project, which he coordinated for the project's first two years.

== Works ==
=== Novels ===
- In the Name of the Father (Doubleday & Company, 1978) ISBN 978-0-385-14080-5
- Heart of the Order (Henry Holt and Company, 1986) ISBN 978-0-03-008503-1
- In the Garden of Papa Santuzzu (Picador/St. Martin's Press, 1999) ISBN 978-0-312-26341-6 (trade paperback edition 2000, Picador USA)
- The Whale Chaser (Academy Chicago Publishers, 2010) ISBN 978-0-89733-610-9 (trade paperback edition 2015, Chicago Review Press)
- In Bruno's Shadow (Guernica Editions, 2023) ISBN 978-1-77183-777-4

=== Short story collections ===
- The Evening News (University of Georgia Press, 1986) ISBN 978-0-8203-0860-9 (trade paperback edition 2013, University of Georgia Press)
- Larabi's Ox: Stories of Morocco (Milkweed Editions, 1992) ISBN 978-0-915943-72-2 (trade paperback edition marking the 25th anniversary of the book's publication, retitled The Arab's Ox, Bordighera Press, 2018) ISBN 978-1-59954-120-4
- Taking it Home: Stories from the Neighborhood (The University of Illinois Press, 1996) ISBN 978-0-252-06483-8

=== Anthologies (selected) ===
- Jerome Beaty; J. Paul Hunter, eds. (1989). New Worlds of Literature: Writings from America's Many Cultures. W. W. Norton.
- Bill Henderson, ed. (1993). The Pushcart Prize, XVIII: Best of the Small Presses. Pushcart Press.
- Amber Coverdale Sumrall; Patricia Vecchine, eds. (1994). Bless Me Father: Stories of Catholic Childhood. Plume/Penguin Books.
- David Starkey; Richard Guzman, eds. (1999). Smokestacks & Skyscrapers: An Anthology of Chicago Writing. Loyola University Press.
- Regina Barreca, ed. (2002). Don't Tell Mama: The Penguin Anthology of Italian American Writing. Penguin Books.
- Venera Fazio; Delia DeSantis, eds. (2004). Sweet Lemons: Writings with a Sicilian Accent. Legas.
- Carla Francellini, ed. (2020). Miraggi italiani. Rome: Artemide Edizioni.

=== Editor ===
- The Habit of Art: Best Stories from the Indiana University Fiction Workshop. Indiana University Press. 2005. ISBN 978-0-253-21807-0.
- Intro 10 (anthology of fiction and poetry). New York: Hendel & Reinke. 1979. ISBN 978-0-918656-05-6.
- Intro 11 (anthology of fiction and poetry). Norfolk: Associated Writing Programs. 1980. ISBN 978-0-936266-00-8.
- Intro 12 (anthology of fiction and poetry). Norfolk: The Associated Writing Programs. 1981. ISBN 978-0-936266-02-2.

== Awards ==
- Black Warrior Review Literary Award in Fiction
- 1985 National Endowment for the Arts Fellowship
- 1986 Virginia Prize for Fiction for Heart of the Order
- 1986 Heart of Order named 10 Best Sports Books by the National Sports Review
- 1986 Flannery O'Connor Award for Short Fiction for The Evening News
- Lawrence Foundation Award
- 1990 National Endowment for the Arts Fellowship
- Prairie Schooner Readers' Choice Award
- 1992 Chicago Foundation for Literature Award for Fiction for Larabi's Ox: Stories of Morocco
- 1992 Milkweed National Fiction Prize for Larabi's Ox: Stories of Morocco
- Cream City Review Editors' Award in Nonfiction
- The Pushcart Prize
- Bruno Arcudi Literary Prize
- 2022 Oregon Literary Fellowship

== Interviews ==
- "Tony Ardizzone reads and discusses his book 'In the Name of the Father,'" interview by Studs Terkel (The WFMT Studs Terkel Radio Archive, 1979)
- "Fiction as Life: An Interview with Tony Ardizzone", by Olivia Kate Cerrone. (Il Regno/Magna Grece: Ethno-Cultural Journal for People of Southern-Italian Descent, 2011)
- "Tony Ardizzone", interviewed by Derek Alger (Pif Magazine, 2012)
- "Writers in Conversation: An Interview with Tony Ardizzone," by Elizabetta Marino, (Flinders University, Adelaide, South Australia, 2017)
- "Meet Tony Ardizzone: 2022 Oregon Literary Fellowship," by Jessica Meza-Torres (Literary Arts Organization, Portland, 2022)
- "'Read. Read widely. Always be reading': An Interview with Novelist Tony Ardizzone," by Christine Sneed (Bookish, 2023)
