= Santucci =

Santucci is a surname. Notable people with the surname include:

- Angelo Santucci (born 1952), Canadian Football League player
- Antonio Santucci (died 1613), Italian astronomer, cosmographer, and scientific instrument maker
- Antonio Santucci (bishop) (1928–2018), Italian Roman Catholic bishop
- Barbara Santucci (born 1947), American artist, poet and author
- Clara Santucci (born 1987), American long-distance runner
- Dan Santucci (born 1983), American football player
- Facundo Santucci (born 1987), Argentine male volleyball player
- Graziano Santucci (died 1517), Italian Roman Catholic Bishop of Alatri
- John J. Santucci (1931–2016), New York politician, D.A. of Queens County
- Lavinia Santucci (born 1985), Italian female basketball player
- Michele Santucci (born 1989), Italian Olympic swimmer
- Pat Santucci (1924–1992), Canadian football player
- Paul Santucci, American politician
- Roberto Santucci (born 1967), Brazilian filmmaker
- Serge Santucci (born 1944), French sculptor and medallist
- Tyler Santucci (born 1988), American football coach
- Vincenzo Santucci (1796–1861), Italian Roman Catholic cardinal

== See also ==
- Mariam Habach Santucci (born 1996), Miss Venezuela 2015
- Palazzo Santucci, Renaissance palace
