= Ievgeniia Spitkovska =

Ukrainian basketball player

No. 5 – BC Avanhard Kyiv
- Position: Point guard
- League: UBSL

Personal information
- Born: 10 May 1988 (age 37); Kharkiv, Ukraine
- Listed height: 5 ft 8 in (1.73 m)

Ievgeniia Spitkovska (born 10 May 1988) is a Ukrainian basketball player for BC Avanhard Kyiv and the Ukrainian national team.

She participated at the EuroBasket Women 2017.
