= Kateryna Dorogobuzova =

Ukrainian basketball player

No. 44 – UMCS Lublin
- Position: Small forward
- League: BLK

Personal information
- Born: June 28, 1990 (age 35); Odesa, Ukraine
- Listed height: 6 ft 2 in (1.88 m)

Kateryna Dorogobuzova (Ukrainian: Катерина Дорогобузова, romanized: Kateryna Dorohobuzova; born June 28, 1990) is a Ukrainian basketball player for UMCS Lublin and the Ukrainian national team.

She participated at the EuroBasket Women 2017.
