= Zoi Dimitrakou =

Greek basketball player (born 1987)

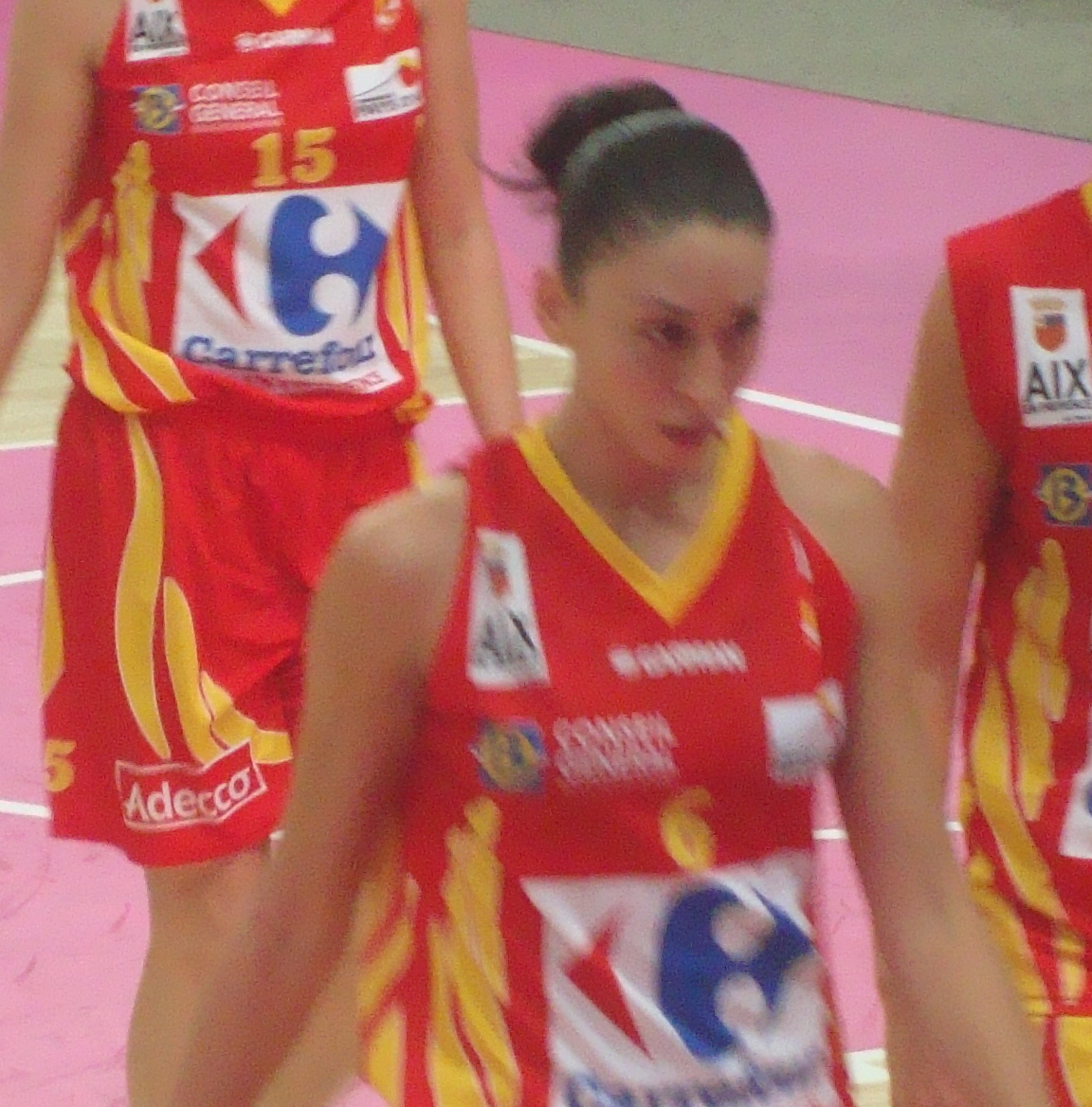

Personal information
- Born: May 25, 1987 (age 39) Thessaloniki, Greece
- Listed height: 6 ft 2 in (1.88 m)
- Position: Forward

Career history
- 2016: Washington Mystics
- Stats at Basketball Reference

Zoi Dimitrakou (Ζωή Δημητράκου, born May 25, 1987), is a Greek former professional basketball player who last played Greece women's national basketball team. She has represented national team in several Eurobasket Women and in 2010 FIBA World Championship for Women. In 2016, she played for Washington Mystics in the WNBA.

== Career statistics ==
Legend
GP	Games played	GS	Games started	MPG	Minutes per game	RPG	Rebounds per game
APG	Assists per game	SPG	Steals per game	BPG	Blocks per game	PPG	Points per game
TO	Turnovers per game	FG%	Field-goal percentage	3P%	3-point field-goal percentage	FT%	Free-throw percentage
**Bold**	Career best	°	League leader

=== WNBA ===
==== Regular season ====
WNBA regular season statistics
Year	Team	GP	GS	MPG	FG%	3P%	FT%	RPG	APG	SPG	BPG	TO	PPG
2016	Washington	2	0	5.5	.333	.500	—	0.5	0.5	0.0	0.0	0.5	1.5
**Career**	1 year, 1 team	2	0	5.5	.333	.500	—	0.5	0.5	0.0	0.0	0.5	1.5
