= In the Name of the Father (novel) =

1978 novel by Tony Ardizzone

- First edition (publ. Doubleday)
- Author: Tony Ardizzone
- Language: English
- Publication date: 1978

In the Name of the Father is the short first novel by award-winning Italian American writer Tony Ardizzone. First published in 1978, the novel is a minimalist work and is the coming-of-age story of Tonto Schwartz. The novel placed Ardizzone amongst the ranks of minimalist writers like Raymond Carver and Ann Beattie, though his later work was not minimalist.

== Plot ==
A novel deeply in the American grain that tells the story of the funny and painful transit to manhood accomplished (and endured) by Tonto Schwartz. It's the story of an emotional search for a lost parent and for a way of living. While young Tonto moves forward through successive rites of passage the psychological direction of the novel is backward in time as he struggles to understand the father he never knew.

Set on Chicago's tough North Side, In the Name of the Father is a portrait of an American youth, a book about Chicago, Catholic education, first friends, and first loves. Its hero is a passionate young man who fights his way through the grim realities of his life to wrong.

== Reviews ==
"The grimness of Tonto's odyssey is alleviated throughout by humor and poignancy."-Jerre Mangione of The Philadelphia Bulletin

"A novel about coming of age in working-class Chicago during the 1950s and early 1960s, In the Name of the Father chronicles the childhood and adolescence of Tonto Schwartz, son of an Italian mother and a Jewish father who dies when Tonto is an infant, leaving as his only legacy his son's apparently jokey name. Tony Ardizzone's first novel (the author is 29) is dense with particular details of Tonto's world—the texture of his Catholic education, the character and qualities of his young cronies, the sociology of his tough North Side neighborhood, his love life and the marginal but mostly contented lives of his mother and aunt.

Tonto's confusion about his place in the world—he drops in and out of college, takes a production-line job in a factory, dates and is hurt by classy girls, loses some teeth at the 1968 Democratic Convention—is of a piece with his striving for an impossible metamorphic reunion and reconciliation with his father. At the novel's close, in a terse but emotional resolution, Tonto begins to come to terms with his own hungers, making his first move toward vocation and manhood.

In the Name of the Father is a carefully woven, sophisticated first novel that avoids sentimentality and self-indulgence."

-Jane Larkin Crain of The New York Times Book Review

"Growing up poor and Catholic in the Chicago of the 1950s and 1960s, Tonto Schwartz, son of an Irish-Catholic mother and a Jewish veteran, goes through schooling with the nuns, friendship, sexual encounters, drinking, and an abortive sojourn in college. Philosophical musings and wrestling with the name his dying father willed him seem to preclude success in work, school, and personal relationships. Following participation in the 1968 Democratic Convention and an accident, Tonto comes to terms with his dead father and with his name. Chicago and the Catholic experience are superbly evoked in this short, well-written novel that most public libraries should consider."-Robert H. Donahugh of Library Journal
