= In the Garden of Papa Santuzzu =

In the Garden of Papa Santuzzu is a novel written by award winning writer Tony Ardizzone. It was first published in hardback in 1999 by Picador/St. Martins and reprinted in 2000 in paperback.

== Plot ==
Dreaming of freedom from a life of brute servitude, hard labor, and debt to a tyrannical landlord, Papa Santuzzu and his wife, Adriana, push their beloved children to immigrate to La Merica, the Land of Opportunity. In his "wild and giddy imagination," Papa Santuzzu ardently believes in the ease of attaining the American Dream, the promise of "life, liberty, and the pursuit of happiness" for all, and rests assured that his children will thrive in this great nation of abundance.

Following the painful, yet exuberant, process of the Santuzzu children's displacement from their homeland and relocation in Papa Santuzzu's conceived lush "faraway garden," Ardizzone's novel re-imagines the meaning of such a journey, where every obvious gain entails some unforeseen sacrifice. A loving tribute to Sicilian American culture, In the Garden of Papa Santuzzu resounds with the traditional folklore and songs of Sicily, implanting within our hearts a vibrant and compassionate perspective of the struggles, joys, and proliferation of diasporic communities in modern America.

In their earnest exodus to America, the Santuzzu children arduously clear away the weeds and briars in what seems a vast and rugged wilderness, managing to cultivate their own unknown, yet nonetheless beautiful, version of their Papa's paradisiacal vision—building, at last, a home-away-from home.

== Reviews ==
"Ardizzone's fascinating work is an intriguing addition to the smallish group of Italian immigrant novels. More literary than literal, the book reads as if told by ghosts around an open fire. Recommended for literary and Italian American collections."-Harold Augenbraum from Library Journal

"Tony Ardizzone's In the Garden of Papa Santuzzu is a remarkable literary achievement that will likely prove the definitive novel of the massive Sicilian immigration to the United States in the early 1900s." -Joseph Gibaldi of Sicilia Parra
