= Romy Bär =

German basketball player (born 1987)

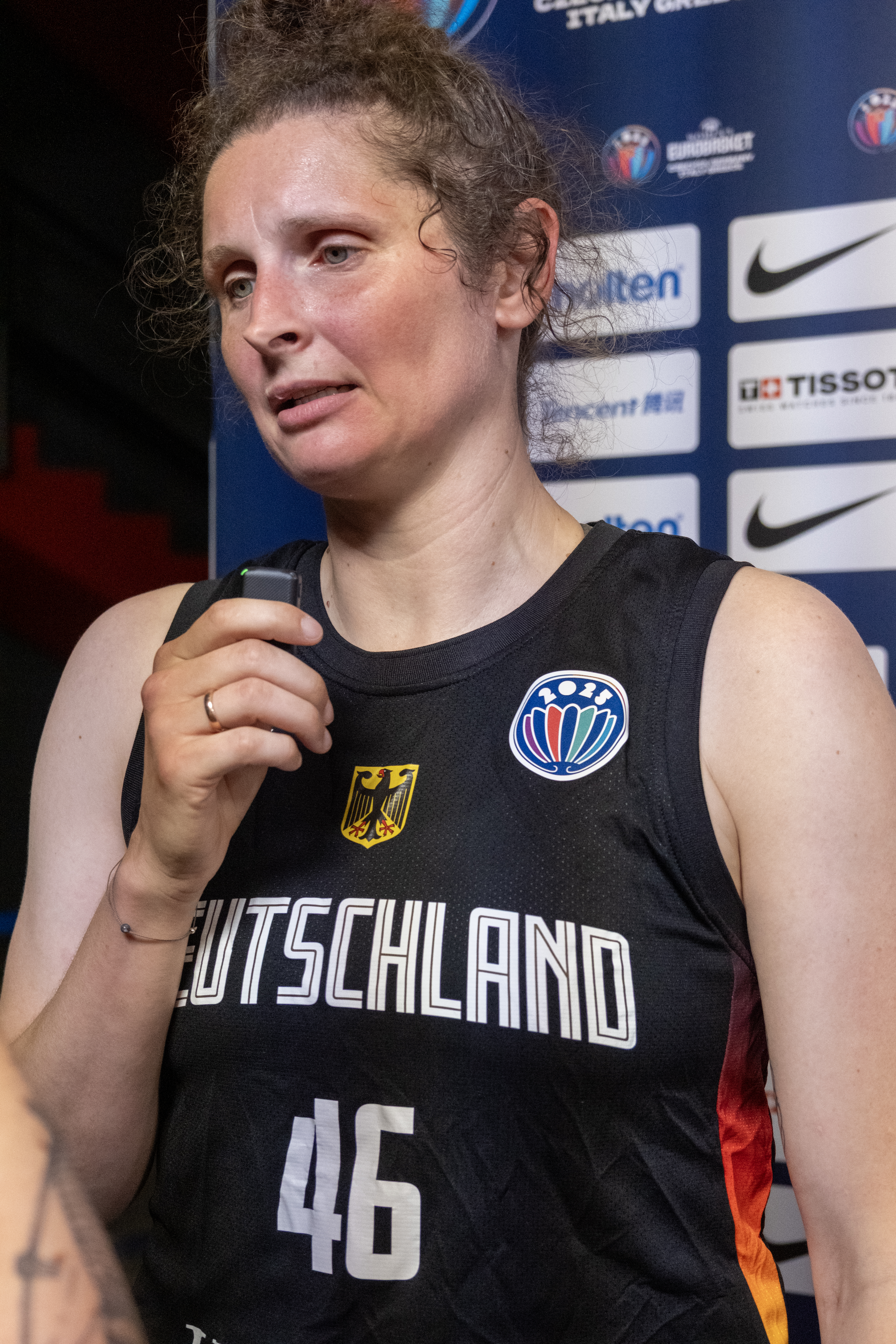
- Bär in June 2025

Personal information
- Born: 17 May 1987 (age 39) Karl-Marx-Stadt, East Germany (now Chemnitz, Germany)
- Listed height: 1.87 m (6 ft 2 in)
- Listed weight: 75 kg (165 lb)

Career information
- Playing career: 2005–2026
- Position: Small forward/power forward

Career history
- 2005–2007: ChemCats Chemnitz
- 2007–2010: Saarlouis Royals
- 2010–2012: Challes-les-Eaux
- 2012–2014: Lyon Basket Féminin
- 2014–2015: Good Angels Košice
- 2015–2017: Cavigal Nice
- 2017–2018: Lattes Montpellier
- 2018: Southern Districts Spartans
- 2018–2019: Villeneuve-d’Ascq
- 2020–2023: Rhineland Lions
- 2023: BBZ Opladen
- 2024–2026: Gisa Lions

Career highlights
- 2x Basketball-Bundesliga champion (2009, 2010); 3x BBL-Pokal winner (2008, 2009, 2010); 2x 2. Basketball-Bundesliga champion (2006, 2021); Slovak League champion (2015); QBL Champion (2018)

Romy Bär (born 17 May 1987) is a German former basketball player. As an almost positionless and versatile player type she embodies modern basketball, in the spirit of a point forward and along the boundaries of conventional statistics.

== Professional career ==
Bär, who is 1.87 m (6 ft 2 in) meter tall and mainly used as a power forward, started playing basketball with the Basketgirls in Chemnitz and won the German championship with the U16 Basketgirls in Berlin in 2002. In the final, she was the most successful scorer with 24 points in a 76–72 victory against Nördlingen.

At the age of 15, Bär was already playing for Chemnitz in the 2. Damen-Basketball-Bundesliga and was promoted to the 1. Damen-Basketball-Bundesliga with the Chemcats Chemnitz in 2006. For the 2007–08 season, Bär moved to league rivals TV 1872 Saarlouis and became BBL-Pokal winner and runner-up with the Saarland team. In the 2008–09 season, she was captain and again won the cup and the German championship. For her performance during the season, she was honored as the league's player of the year at the beginning of the 2009/10 season. In the 2009–10 season, she was able to repeat the cup victory and the championship with the Saarlouis Royals. After finishing her studies in the summer of 2010 and winning five titles in three years with the Royals, Bär moved to France to play for Challes-les-Eaux. For the 2014/15 season, she and her national team colleague Katharina Fikiel moved to Slovakia to play for the first division team Good Angels Košice.

After a season in Slovakia, she returned to France and was signed by the first division team Cavigal Nice Basket in August 2015. She stayed there for two years and moved to Lattes Montpellier within the French league for the 2017–18 season and also competed with the club in the EuroLeague. Bär went to Brisbane, Australia, and played for the Southern District Spartans in the Queensland Basketball League (QBL) in the 2018 summer season, winning the championship title. In the 2018–19 season, she played for Villeneuve-d’Ascq in France.

In the summer of 2020, she returned to Germany and accepted an offer from the second division club RheinLand Lions. The club from Bergisch Gladbach, in which she played for, was promoted to the Bundesliga and became German runner-up in 2022. In January 2023, the club declared insolvency, and Bär moved to the second division club BBZ Opladen.

Bär became a mother and took a break in the 2023–24 season and in May 2024, the Bundesliga club Gisa Lions announced they had signed her. In April 2026 she announced her retirement as a player.

== National team career ==
Bär played for all of the youth national teams and was called up to the senior national team in 2008. She played her first international match against Belgium in the preparation match for the additional qualifying round for the European Championship. In her first competitive game on 9 January 2009 in Kyiv, she scored 21 points in a 47–73 loss to Ukraine.

In 2024, Bär participated in the Summer Olympics in Paris. At the EuroBasket Women 2025, she reached the quarter-finals with the German team.

== Awards and honors ==
- Saar Sportsperson of the Year (2): 2008 (team), 2009 (Saar Sportswoman of the Year)
- DBBL Player of the Year of the 2009–10 season
- Rheinisch-Bergischer Kreis Sportswomen of the Year 2021 (team)

== Personal life ==
Bär's partner is former American basketball player Ambrosia Anderson, who last played for BBZ Opladen (2021–22), they both played together in Nice and Australia.
