= In the Name of the Father (It: Welcome to Derry) =

6th episode of the 1st season of It: Welcome to Derry

- It: Welcome to Derry episode
- Clint Bowers (Peter Outerbridge) leading a group of masked and armed men to the Black Spot to capture Hank Grogan (Stephen Rider).
- Episode no.: Episode 6
- Directed by: Jamie Travis
- Written by: Jason Fuchs; Cord Jefferson; Brad Caleb Kane
- Cinematography by: Catherine Lutes
- Editing by: Esther Sokolow
- Original air date: November 30, 2025
- Running time: 56 minutes

Guest appearance
- Tyner Rushing as Young Ingrid Kersh

Episode chronology
← Previous "29 Neibolt Street"	Next → "The Black Spot"

"In the Name of the Father" is the sixth episode of the American supernatural horror television series It: Welcome to Derry. The episode was written by co-showrunner Jason Fuchs, consulting producer Cord Jefferson, and co-showrunner Brad Caleb Kane, and directed by Jamie Travis. It was first broadcast on HBO in the United States on November 30, 2025, and also was available on HBO Max on the same date.

In the episode, Lilly tries to find more information about Pennywise's past, while Hank asks for help in hiding after escaping from custody.

The episode earned a mixed response from critics; while they praised the cliffhanger and character development, others were polarized over the episode's twist.

== Plot ==
In 1935, a girl named Mabel is residing in Juniper Hill. A nurse takes her to the basement, where she has claimed that a clown has been taunting her. They notice a red balloon floating towards a door, where Pennywise emerges.

In 1962, a paranoid Leroy scolds Will for going in the sewers and forbids him from leaving the base. When Will resists, Leroy slaps him, forcing an upset Will to flee back with his friends. Lilly brings the pillar, explaining that Pennywise retreated at its sight. She wants to go back, but Ronnie refuses, and they have a heated argument. With Charlotte's help, some airmen take Hank to hide in the Black Spot, despite Hallorann's disapproval. When Leroy finds out about Hank's condition, Hallorann opens up about his childhood, explaining that his grandmother taught him to create a "box" that would keep spirits locked away.

After bonding with Rich, Marge is approached by the Pattycakes, mocking the gang again. Marge insults them and causes Rhonda to vomit by showing her damaged eye. Following a hallucination in school, Lilly visits Ingrid, and sees some family pictures. She is shocked to find an image of Pennywise's original form, a man named Bob Gray. After noticing a costume, Lilly realizes that Ingrid was the clown at the cemetery, not It in disguise. Ingrid reveals that "Pennywise" is her father; he mysteriously disappeared, but she stayed in Derry. She eventually worked as a nurse in Juniper Hill and in 1935, she got Mabel to attract Pennywise. Despite attempting to connect with him, Pennywise devoured Mabel. He subsequently took the form of Ingrid's father to tease her before fleeing. Ingrid then proceeded to feed children to It for years, hoping that It would bring her father back.

Ingrid proposes Lilly to go with her and let the entity become her father, but Lilly runs away after using the pillar to attack her. The kids join the adults at a party event in the Black Spot, with Rich allowed to play the drums. Chief Bowers is relieved of his duty after his failure to catch Hank, but is informed by a woman about his status at the Black Spot. Instead, he meets with some bar patrons who demand Hank's arrest, convincing them to join him in raiding the place. Using masks, they arrive armed outside the Black Spot.

== Production ==
=== Development ===
The episode was written by co-showrunner Jason Fuchs, consulting producer Cord Jefferson, and co-showrunner Brad Caleb Kane, and directed by Jamie Travis. It marked Fuchs' second writing credit, Jefferson's first writing credit, Kane's second writing credit, and Travis' second directorial credit.

=== Writing ===
Regarding the episode's plot twist, wherein it is revealed Ingrid is the daughter of the clown at the carnival, Fuchs said, "It's pretty out there, but it also felt emotionally and somatically, very plugged into the structure and the story of the season and what we were trying to accomplish". He added, "You know, horror is intended to shock and surprise, and sometimes that can take the form of a jump scare, but it also can take the form of these really emotional, hopefully shocking story turns. And this was one of those that I think we're the proudest of, once we started to understand how it might operate".

== Reception ==
"In the Name of the Father" earned mixed-to-positive reviews from critics. Tom Jorgensen of IGN gave the episode a "good" 7 out of 10 rating and wrote in his verdict, "“In the Name of the Father” does a good job of re-establishing the stakes going into Welcome to Derry's climax, as the fallout of Pennywise's emergence forces characters to get their priorities in order. The kids are (mostly) united, but Lilly's detour to Ingrid's house and all we learn about the latter's motives as Periwinkle call attention to how many plates the show is going to need to keep spinning through what promises to be a very chaotic next couple of episodes."

William Hughes of The A.V. Club gave the episode a "B" grade and wrote, "This theorizing is brought to you by “In The Name Of The Father,” one of Welcome To Derry's best episodes to date — when it's not getting bogged down in Darth Vader-esque revelations about who is, or isn't, the deluded spawn of our resident murder clown. Admittedly, the late-episode reveal that Ingrid Kersh the helpful housekeeper was originally Periwinkle Gray — daughter of the circus performer from whom IT stole its favored horror persona — does have obvious parallels to the more nuanced story “In The Name” is telling about parents and children. But despite Madeleine Stowe's noble efforts to try to keep this apparently mandatory “Oh my god, this changes everything!” late-season turn grounded in the realm of emotional plausibility, the twist arrives like a pair of big, floppy clown shoe steps trodding all over what had previously been a much more elegant affair."

Louis Peitzman of Vulture gave the episode a 2 star rating out of 5 and wrote, "After finally finding some much-needed forward momentum, the show backslides with “In the Name of the Father,” an hour that's almost entirely about inaction. Aside from one big reveal (undermined by the fact that we figured it out last week), we spend an awful lot of time with characters refusing to do the things they'll inevitably end up doing. You could argue that this is the series putting the pieces in place for the final two episodes, but it's still a slog to get through, and a reminder of the larger problem of dragging this story out over the course of eight episodes."

Eric Francisco of Esquire wrote, "In episode 6, "In the Name of the Father," patriarchs come in all shapes and sizes: loving ones who hug, loving ones who hurt, and loving ones who feed on young children. You know, normal dad stuff." Shawn Van Horn of Collider gave the episode a 8 out of 10 rating and wrote, "Now, there'll certainly be a terrifying rush to the finish as our new group of Losers battles the killer alien clown."

Zach Dionne of Decider wrote, "Bowers says a “lady called in a tip” anonymously, pointing them to the Black Spot. Could that lady be the one putting on her Periwinkle costume just before the mob pulls up to the Black Spot, toting not pitchforks but rifles and shotguns, more than a few of them in clown masks?" Chris Gallardo of Telltale TV gave the episode a 3.1 star rating out of 5 and wrote, "It: Welcome to Derry Season 1 Episode 6 is a troubling, yet adequately intense, episode with more social paranoia and unusual character twists that's carried by Halloran and the Losers Club. As this series slowly reaches its conclusion, I hope that it can push the horror into a higher gear before it runs out of narrative beats to try out."

Sean T. Collins of The New York Times wrote, "Although our attention has been largely occupied by the kids and the clown, let's not take for granted how good this show's three grown-up leads are. Chris Chalk, Jovan Adepo and Taylour Paige make the adult material as magnetic as that of the young losers."
