= Oberanven =

Coordinates: 49°39′N 6°14′E

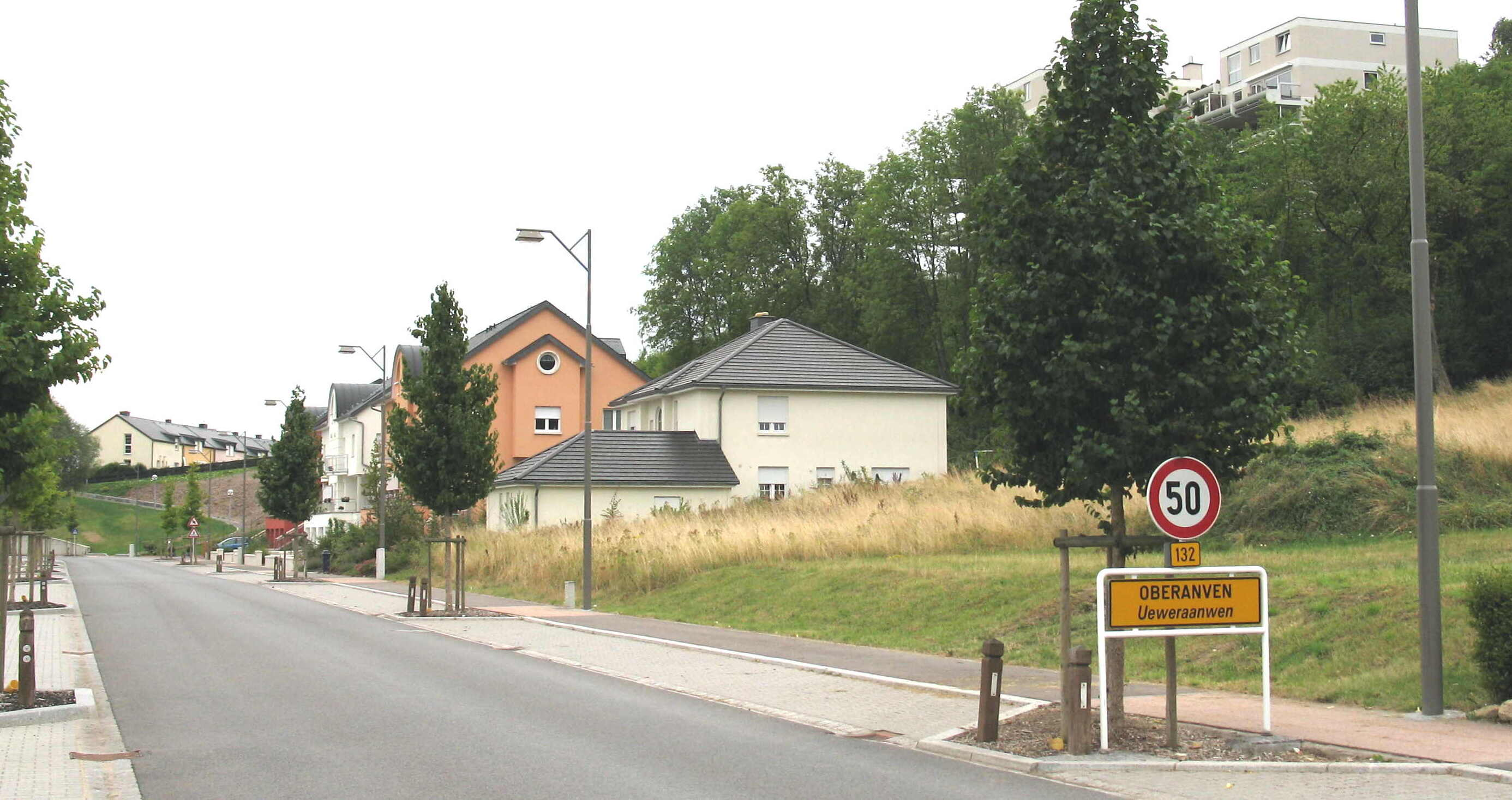

Oberanven (German pronunciation: [ˈoːbɐˌʔanvn̩], lit. 'Upper Anven'; Luxembourgish: Ueweraanwen [uəvəˈʀaːnvən]) is a small town in the commune of Niederanven, in central Luxembourg. As of September 2026, the town has a population of 849. It is the administrative centre of the commune of Niederanven: new headquarters having been built in the town in 2005.
