= Sofie Hendrickx =

Belgian basketball player

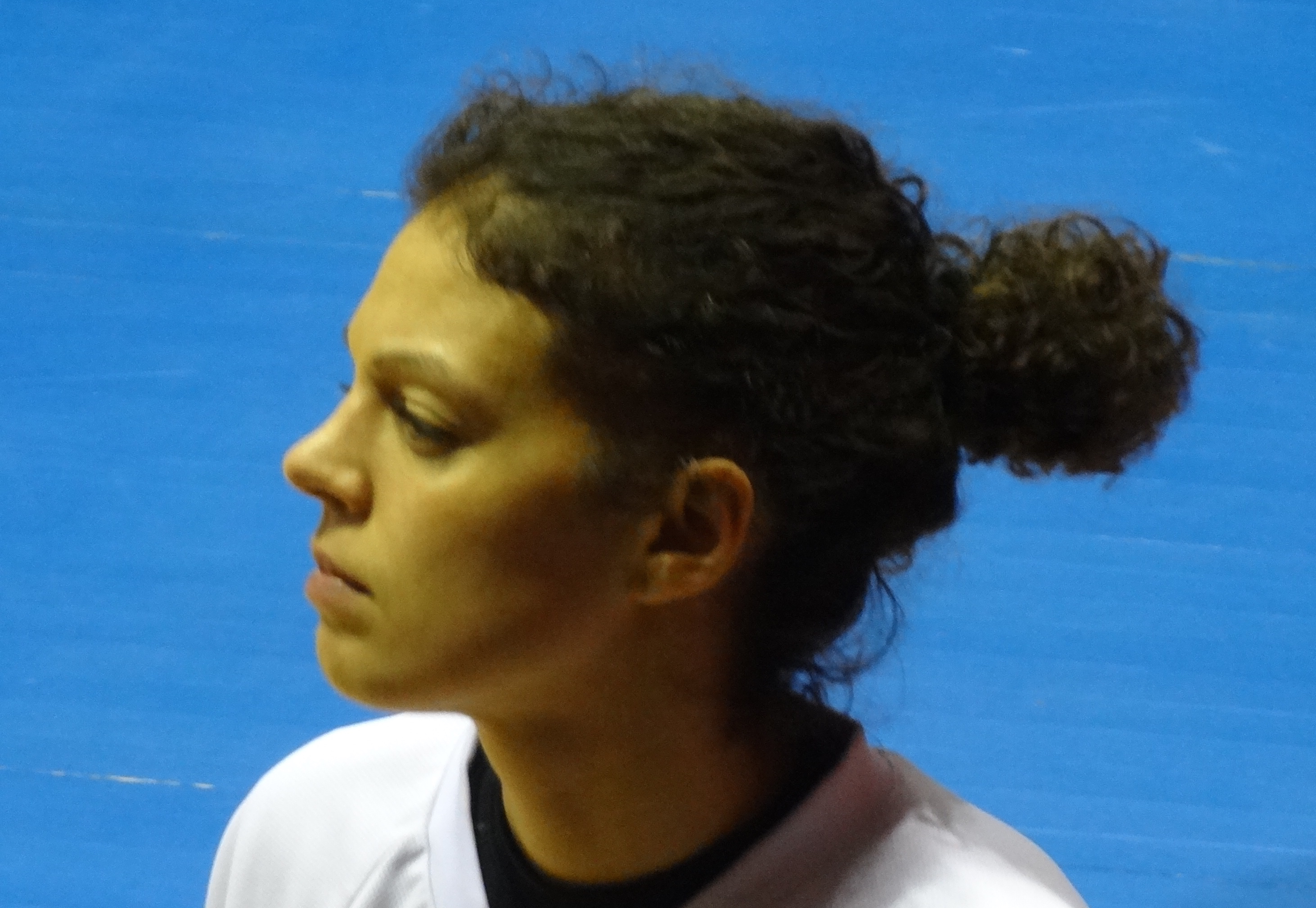
- Hendrickx in 2015

No. 8 – BC Namur-Capitale
- Position: Power forward
- League: BBL

Personal information
- Born: May 18, 1986 (age 40) Lier, Belgium
- Listed height: 6 ft 2 in (1.88 m)

Sofie Hendrickx (born May 18, 1986) is a Belgian basketball player for BC Namur-Capitale and the Belgian national team.

She participated at the EuroBasket Women 2017.
