= Black Warrior Review =

- Discipline: Literary journal
- Language: English
- Edited by: Jackson Saul

Publication details
- History: 1974–present
- Publisher: University of Alabama (United States)
- Frequency: Biannual Print Journals and Annual Online Journal

Standard abbreviations
- ISO 4: Black Warrior Rev.

Indexing
- ISSN: 0193-6301

Links
- Journal homepage

Black Warrior Review (BWR) is a non-profit American literary magazine founded in 1974 and based at the University of Alabama. It is the oldest continuously run literary journal by graduate students in the United States. Published in print biannually, and online annually, BWR features fiction, nonfiction, poetry, comics, and art. Work appearing in BWR has been anthologized in the Pushcart Prize collection, The Best American Short Stories (1993 and 2009), Best American Poetry, and New Stories from the South. The spring 1978 issue was the first to feature graphics and included a photo essay by Diane Mastin. Writer's Digest has named BWR as one of 19 "magazines that matter".

In 2018, BWR began its annual online edition, Boyfriend Village. Boyfriend Village is named after a short story by a former editor of BWR, Zach Doss, who died on March 15, 2018.

== See also ==
- List of literary magazines
