= Lavinia Santucci =

Italian basketball player (born 1985)

Personal information
- Born: 4 June 1985 (age 41) Rome, Italy
- Listed height: 1.85 m (6 ft 1 in)

Career information
- WNBA draft: 2007: undrafted
- Playing career: 2004–present
- Position: Power forward

Career history
- 2004-2008: Virtus Viterbo
- 2008-2013: C. A. Faenza
- 2013: Riva Basket
- 2013: CUS Cagliari
- 2013-2015: PF Umbertide

Lavinia Santucci (born 4 June 1985) is an Italian female basketball player.
