= EuroBasket Women 2029 qualification =

The EuroBasket Women 2029 qualification will start in November 2026 to decide the teams to join the co-hosts, that are yet to be determined.

== Format ==
Ten teams will enter in round 1 and be split into two groups of three and one group of four. The top team of each group will advance to round 2. In round 2 they will play in a round-robin, with the winner qualifying for the qualifiers.

== Pre-qualifiers ==
=== First round ===
Matches will be played on 11 to 17 November 2026 and 10 to 16 February 2027, with three matches per window.

==== Draw ====
The draw took place on 31 March 2026.

===== Seeding =====
The seeding was announced on 25 March 2026.

Seed 1
Team	Pos
Bosnia and Herzegovina	28
Switzerland	46
Romania	60

Seed 2
Team	Pos
Iceland	63
Norway	65
Estonia	67

Seed 3
Team	Pos
North Macedonia	70
Cyprus	76
Ireland	77

Seed 4
Team	Pos
Azerbaijan	93

==== Groups ====
===== Group A =====
Pos	Team	Pld	W	L	PF	PA	PD	Pts	Qualification
1	Iceland	3	3	0	310	196	+114	6	Second round
2	Switzerland	3	2	1	245	210	+35	5	
3	Ireland	3	1	2	241	233	+8	4	
4	Azerbaijan	3	0	3	147	304	−157	3	

Updated to match(es) played on 17 November 2026. Source: FIBA
Rules for classification: 1) Points; 2) Head-to-head; 3) Points difference; 4) Points scored.

11 November 2026	Azerbaijan	33–84	Switzerland	Baku
15:00	Scoring by quarter: 7–14, 6–27, 16–23, 4–20
	Pts: Ismayilova 12; Rebs: Shchukina 7 Asts: Allahverdiyeva 4	Boxscore	Pts: Herminjard 12; Rebs: Jacquot 7 Asts: Herminjard, Takyi 5	Arena: Baku Sports Palace; Referees: Duhan Köyiçi (TUR), Ema Nikochevikj (MKD), Stefan Kuburović (MNE)

11 November 2026	Ireland	73–81	Iceland	Dublin
19:00	Scoring by quarter: 17–21, 25–17, 15–25, 16–18
	Pts: Hickey 25; Rebs: Hickey 14; Asts: Maguire, Thornton 3	Boxscore	Pts: Steingrímsdóttir 18; Rebs: Steingrímsdóttir 9 Asts: Steingrímsdóttir 6	Arena: National Basketball Arena; Attendance: 500; Referees: Andrea Valzani (ITA), Tiago Roxo (POR), Indrė Balnionytė-Gecevičienė (LTU)

14 November 2026	Azerbaijan	73–91	Ireland	Baku
14:00	Scoring by quarter: 20–24, 20–22, 15–18, 18–27
	Pts: Shchukina 22; Rebs: Carter 7 Asts: Carter 11	Boxscore	Pts: Fitzpatrick 21; Rebs: Hickey, Maguire 8 Asts: Maguire 5	Arena: Sarkhadchi Sport Center; Attendance: 540; Referees: Suzana Vujičić (MNE), Frane Mjeda (CRO), Diana Lapanović (SLO)

14 November 2026	Iceland	100–82	Switzerland	Hafnarfjörður
16:00	Scoring by quarter: 25–19, 30–21, 19–20, 26–22
	Pts: Hinriksdóttir 31; Rebs: Hinriksdóttir 9 Asts: Steingrímsdóttir, Hinriksdóttir 5	Boxscore	Pts: Herminjard 26; Rebs: Wenger 20; Asts: Herminjard 9	Arena: Íþróttamiðstöð Asvellir; Attendance: 850; Referees: Skirmantas Letukas (LTU), Kate Unsworth (GBR), Anna Belousova (LAT)

17 November 2026	Switzerland	79–77	Ireland	Fribourg
19:00	Scoring by quarter: 19–21, 23–16, 21–13, 16–27
	Pts: Vincenzi 19; Rebs: Vilolo 7 Asts: three players 4	Boxscore	Pts: Hickey 29; Rebs: Maguire 11; Asts: O'Donnell 8	Arena: Salle Saint Leonard; Attendance: 1,045; Referees: Giacomo Dori (ITA), Teo Miletić (CRO), Petr Hrůša (CZE)

17 November 2026	Iceland	129–41	Azerbaijan	Hafnarfjörður
19:30	Scoring by quarter: 30–11, 22–11, 47–10, 30–9
	Pts: Ágústsdóttir 41; Rebs: Elíasdóttir, Grímsdóttir 7 Asts: Elíasdóttir 11	Boxscore	Pts: Ulyanova 8 Rebs: Ulyanova 6 Asts: Gokcol 3	Arena: Íþróttamiðstöð Asvellir; Attendance: 850; Referees: Paweł Pacek (POL), Brehima Sissoko (FRA), Simon Unsworth (GBR)

10 February 2026	Switzerland	vs.	Azerbaijan
		Boxscore

10 February 2026	Iceland	vs.	Ireland
		Boxscore

13 February 2026	Switzerland	vs.	Iceland
		Boxscore

13 February 2026	Ireland	vs.	Azerbaijan
		Boxscore

16 February 2026	Ireland	vs.	Switzerland
		Boxscore

16 February 2026	Azerbaijan	vs.	Iceland
		Boxscore

===== Group B =====
Pos	Team	Pld	W	L	PF	PA	PD	Pts	Qualification
1	Cyprus	2	2	0	129	121	+8	4	Second round
2	Bosnia and Herzegovina	2	1	1	136	130	+6	3	
3	Norway	2	0	2	116	130	−14	2	

Updated to match(es) played on 17 November 2026. Source: FIBA
Rules for classification: 1) Points; 2) Head-to-head; 3) Points difference; 4) Points scored.

11 November 2026	Bosnia and Herzegovina	66–69	Cyprus	Sarajevo
18:00	Scoring by quarter: 19–20, 19–21, 13–11, 15–17
	Pts: Domuzin 14; Rebs: Damjanović, Šipka 8 Asts: Kešeljević 6	Boxscore	Pts: Pangalos 27; Rebs: Pilakouta 6 Asts: Kyprianou, Pangalos 5	Arena: Sportska dvorana Hrasnica; Attendance: 350; Referees: Timo Axmann (AUT), Hristo Hristov (BUL), Raphaela Reiner (AUT)

14 November 2026	Cyprus	60–55	Norway	Limassol
17:00	Scoring by quarter: 22–16, 8–7, 13–12, 17–20
	Pts: Pangalos 24; Rebs: Pilakouta 8 Asts: Kyprianou 4	Boxscore	Pts: Uggen 14; Rebs: Sanford 8 Asts: Torresani 3	Arena: Spyros Kyprianou Athletic Center; Attendance: 1,000; Referees: Aleksandar Radonjic (AUT), Nir Meirson (ISR), Alina Dekany (ROU)

17 November 2026	Norway	61–70	Bosnia and Herzegovina	Bergen
18:00	Scoring by quarter: 17–14, 19–16, 12–22, 13–18
	Pts: Haukenes 20; Rebs: Austgulen 6 Asts: Torresani 4	Boxscore	Pts: Guska, Kešeljević 14; Rebs: Domuzin 9 Asts: Domuzin 8	Arena: Haukelandshallen; Attendance: 1,300; Referees: Skirmantas Letukas (LTU), Stan Kestein (NED), Shaker Nasrollah (SWE)

10 February 2026	Cyprus	vs.	Bosnia and Herzegovina
		Boxscore

13 February 2026	Norway	vs.	Cyprus
		Boxscore

16 February 2026	Bosnia and Herzegovina	vs.	Norway
		Boxscore

===== Group C =====
Pos	Team	Pld	W	L	PF	PA	PD	Pts	Qualification
1	Estonia	2	2	0	158	119	+39	4	Second round
2	Romania	2	1	1	141	124	+17	3	
3	North Macedonia	2	0	2	103	159	−56	2	

Updated to match(es) played on 17 November 2026. Source: FIBA
Rules for classification: 1) Points; 2) Head-to-head; 3) Points difference; 4) Points scored.

11 November 2026	Romania	73–52	North Macedonia	Bucharest
18:00	Scoring by quarter: 21–4, 24–14, 10–21, 18–13
	Pts: Armani 15; Rebs: Vîrjoghe 7 Asts: Podar 6	Boxscore	Pts: Dimova 11; Rebs: Nikolikj 8 Asts: Adamovska 6	Arena: Sala Polivalentă „Rapid” Attendance: 938; Referees: Polat Parlak (TUR), Pantelis Vasilou (CYP), Alexandra Iurii (MDA)

14 November 2026	North Macedonia	51–86	Estonia	Štip
18:00	Scoring by quarter: 9–23, 21–26, 10–24, 11–13
	Pts: Petrushevska 11; Rebs: Dimova, Nikolikj 6 Asts: Maksimovska 4	Boxscore	Pts: Asi, Lass 18; Rebs: Sirgi 10; Asts: Asi 10	Arena: Sport Centre "Djekson"; Attendance: 650; Referees: Edison Gjoni (ALB), Ivan Krstović (MNE), Jeta Zeka (KOS)

17 November 2026	Estonia	72–68	Romania	Tallinn
19:00	Scoring by quarter: 20–16, 22–15, 14–21, 16–16
	Pts: Asi 26; Rebs: Sepp 9 Asts: Sepp 9	Boxscore	Pts: Vîrjoghe 12; Rebs: Vîrjoghe 7 Asts: Cătinean 6	Arena: Nord Sports Hall; Attendance: 727; Referees: Deividas Mačiulskis (LTU), Juha Penttilä (FIN), Stefán Kristinsson (ISL)

10 February 2026	North Macedonia	vs.	Romania
		Boxscore

13 February 2026	Estonia	vs.	North Macedonia
		Boxscore

16 February 2026	Romania	vs.	Estonia
		Boxscore

=== Second round ===
Matches will be played from 11 to 13 June 2027.

==== Teams ====
Entrance/qualification method	Team(s)
Advanced from First round	

==== Group D ====
Pos	Team	Pld	W	L	PF	PA	PD	Pts	Qualification
1	Team 1	0	0	0	0	0	0	0	Qualifiers
2	Team 2	0	0	0	0	0	0	0	
3	Team 3	0	0	0	0	0	0	0	

First match(es) will be played: 11 June 2027. Source: FIBA
Rules for classification: 1) Points; 2) Head-to-head; 3) Points difference; 4) Points scored.
