= North Macedonia women's national basketball team =

North Macedonia
- FIBA ranking: 70 ▲7 (18 March 2026)
- Joined FIBA: 1993
- FIBA zone: FIBA Europe
- National federation: Basketball Federation of North Macedonia
- Coach: Aleksandar Ashadanov
- Nickname(s): Лавови (Lions); Црвено-Жолти (Red-Yellows); Фаланга (Phalanx)

Olympic Games
- Appearances: None

World Cup
- Appearances: None

EuroBasket
- Appearances: None
Home	Away

First international
- Austria 47–64 Macedonia (Stara Zagora, Bulgaria; 1999)

Biggest win
- Macedonia 129–19 Gibraltar (Ohrid, Macedonia; 2000)

Biggest defeat
- Belgium 112–41 Macedonia (Leuven, Belgium; 14 November 2022)

The North Macedonia women's national basketball team represents North Macedonia in international women's basketball competitions. They played their first match in 1999 B-Division for Women's Eurobasket. The national team played 3 times in B-Division Women's Eurobasket.

== Competitions ==
Until 1992 Macedonia was part of the Yugoslavia women's national basketball team. After 1992, the national team did not manage to qualify for the final stage of the competitions.

- B-Division or Promotion Cup, now called FIBA Women's European Championship for Small Countries, was held in Ohrid Biljanini Izvori Sports Hall twice. First in 2000 European Promotion Cup for Women the national team was the host of the event. They won the tournament by winning for victories against Gibraltar 129:12 , Malta 83-20, Andora 102:35 and Scotland 68:41.
- 2012 FIBA Women's European Championship for Small Countries After 12 years was held for the second time in Ohrid, and this time they finished second. The host of the tournament was again Ohrid Sports Center. This time the score was 4–1 after losing the final game. At Biljanini Izvori Sports Hall they won against Gibraltar 83:36, Austria 41:39, Wales 106:48 in the group stage. In the semi-final they beat Scotland 80:61. In the final game they faced Austria again, this time losing the close game by 63:68.

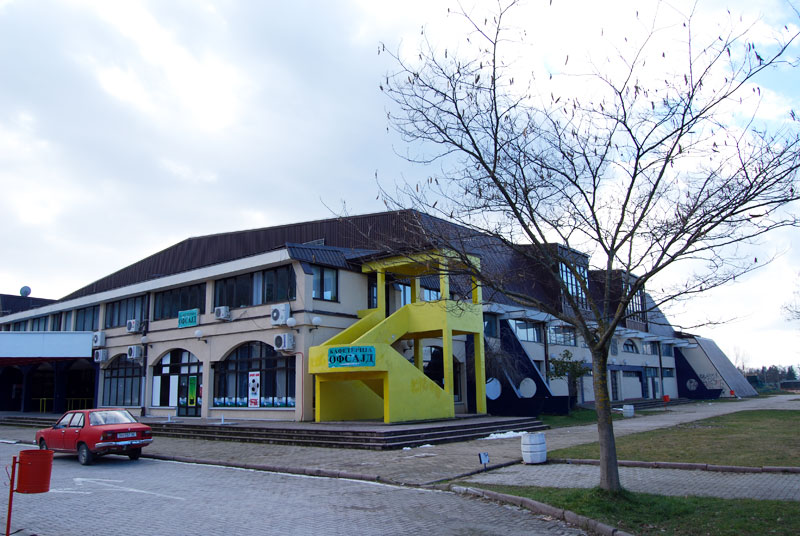
Biljanini Izvori Sports Hall

After a few seasons they entered the Women's Eurobasket qualification. They played 3 times in the Women's Eurobasket Qualification.

=== Olympic Games ===
(Socialist Federal Republic of Yugoslavia) (Socialist Republic of Macedonia) 1980 (3), 1984 (6), 1988 (2)

Year	Round	Position	Pld	W	L
(Spain) 1992	Couldn't Enter				
(United States) 1996	Couldn't Enter; Women's Eurobasket Served as Qualification for the tournament They didn't Qualify for Eurobasket				
(Australia) 2000	Couldn't Enter; Women's Eurobasket Served as Qualification for the tournament They didn't Qualify for Eurobasket				
(Greece) 2004	Couldn't Enter; Women's Eurobasket Served as Qualification for the tournament They didn't Qualify for Eurobasket				
(China) 2008	Couldn't Enter; Women's Eurobasket Served as Qualification for the tournament They didn't Qualify for Eurobasket				
(United Kingdom) 2012	Couldn't Enter; Women's Eurobasket Served as Qualification for the tournament They didn't Qualify for Eurobasket				
(Brazil) 2016	Couldn't Enter; Women's Eurobasket Served as Qualification for the tournament They didn't Qualify for Eurobasket				
(Japan) 2020	Couldn't Enter; Women's Eurobasket Served as Qualification for the tournament They didn't Qualify for Eurobasket				
(France) 2024	Didn't Qualify				
(United States) 2028	To be determined				
Total	0 Titles	0	0	0	0

=== World Championship ===
(Socialist Federal Republic of Yugoslavia) (Socialist Republic of Macedonia) 1959 (4), 1964 (6), 1967 (6), 1983 (8), 1990 (2)

Year	Round	Position	Pld	W	L
(Australia) 1994	Couldn't Enter; Women's Eurobasket Served as Qualification for the tournament They didn't Qualify for Eurobasket				
(United States) 1996	Couldn't Enter; Women's Eurobasket Served as Qualification for the tournament They didn't Qualify for Eurobasket				
(Germany) 1998	Couldn't Enter; Women's Eurobasket Served as Qualification for the tournament They didn't Qualify for Eurobasket				
(China) 2002	Couldn't Enter; Women's Eurobasket Served as Qualification for the tournament They didn't Qualify for Eurobasket				
(Brazil) 2006	Couldn't Enter; Women's Eurobasket Served as Qualification for the tournament They didn't Qualify for Eurobasket				
(Czech Republic) 2010	Couldn't Enter; Women's Eurobasket Served as Qualification for the tournament They didn't Qualify for Eurobasket				
(Turkey) 2014	Couldn't Enter; Women's Eurobasket Served as Qualification for the tournament They didn't Qualify for Eurobasket				
(Spain) 2018	Couldn't Enter; Women's Eurobasket Served as Qualification for the tournament They didn't Qualify for Eurobasket				
(Australia) 2022	Couldn't Enter; Women's Eurobasket Served as Qualification for the tournament They didn't Qualify for Eurobasket				
(Germany) 2026	Couldn't Enter; Women's Eurobasket Served as Qualification for the tournament They didn't Qualify for Eurobasket				
(Japan) 2030	To be determined				
Total	0 Titles	0	0	0	0

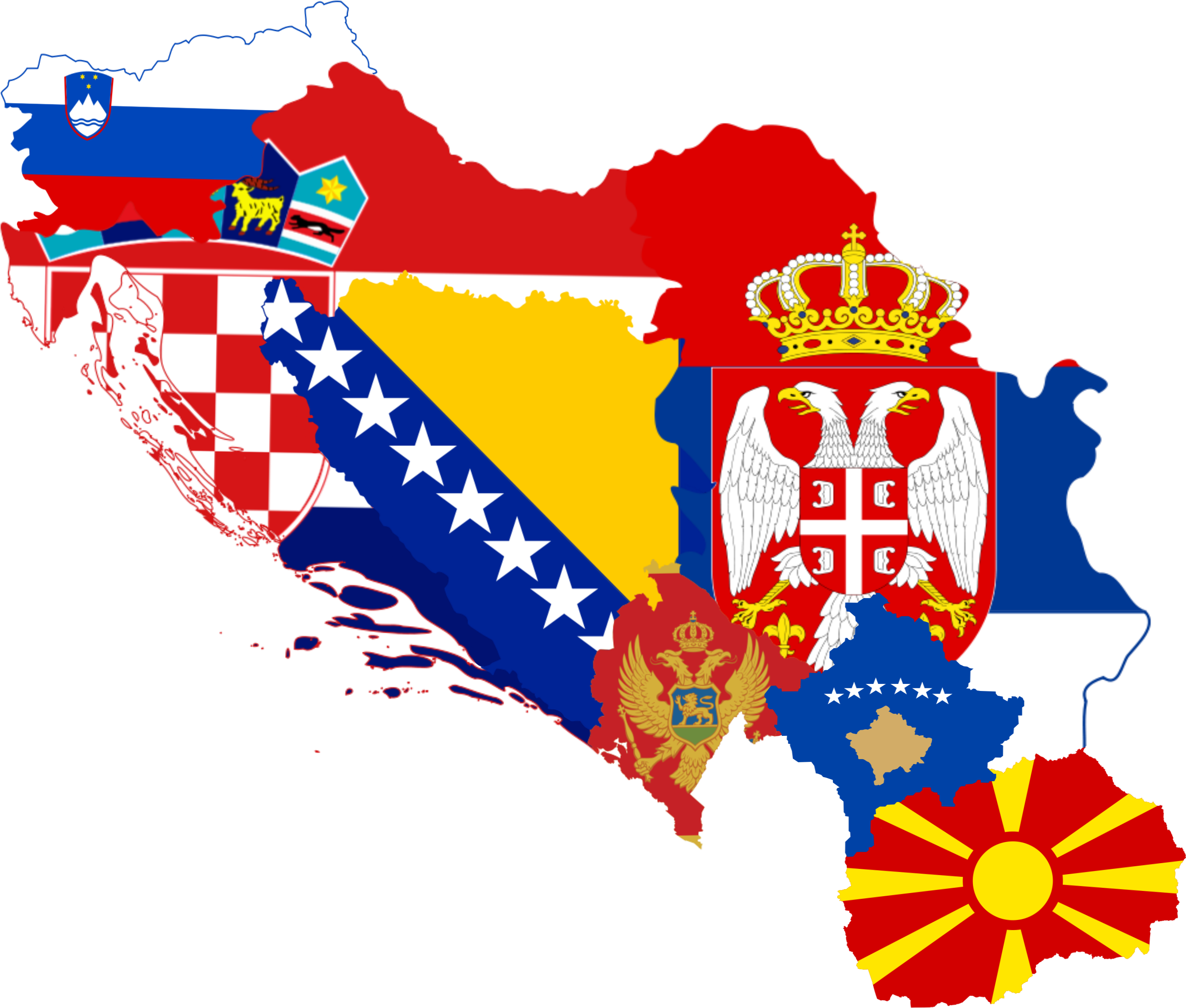
Within Yugoslavia Federal Team 1948-1991

=== EuroBasket ===
(Socialist Federal Republic of Yugoslavia) (Socialist Republic of Macedonia) 1954(5),1956(9),1958(4),1960(5),1962(5),1964(7)
1966(6),1968(2),1970(3),1972(8),1974(8),1976(5),1978(2)
1980(3),1981(4),1983(4),1985(5),1987(2),1989(4),1991(2)

Year	Round	Position	Pld	W	L
(Italy) 1993	didn't Enter				
(Czech Republic) 1995	Didn't participate				
(Hungary) 1997	Didn't participate				
(Poland) 1999	Didn't participate				
(France) 2001	B-division				
(Greece) 2003	Didn't participate				
(Turkey) 2005	B-division				
(Italy) 2007	Didn't participate				
(Latvia) 2009	B-division				
(Poland) 2011	Didn't participate				
(France) 2013	Didn't participate				
(Hungary) (Romania) 2015	Didn't Qualify				
(Czech Republic) 2017	Didn't participate				
(Latvia) (Serbia) 2019	Didn't Qualify				
(France) (Spain) 2021	Disqualified				
(Israel) (Slovenia) 2023	Didn't Qualify				
(Czech Republic) (Germany) (Italy) (Greece) 2025	Didn't Qualify				
(Belgium) (Finland) (Sweden) (Lithuania) 2027	Didn't Qualify				
Total		0/5	0	0	0

=== Mediterranean Games ===
Year	Round	Position	Pld	W	L
(France) 1993	Did not participate				
(Italy) 1997	Did not participate				
(Tunisia) 2001	Did not participate				
(Spain) 2005	Did not participate				
(Italy) 2009	Did not participate				
(Turkey) 2013	Cancelled				
(Spain) 2018	Did not participate				
(Algeria) 2022	Did not participate				
Total	0 Titles	0	0	0	0

== Team ==
- Aleksandra Stojanovska
- Tijana Mitreva
- Matea Nikolikj
- Nena Trajchevska
- Merit Hempe
- Elena Antikj – captain
- Ilina Selcova
- Milica Nikolikj
- DeWanna Bonner
- Angela Mitrishanovikj
- Ivana Kmetovska
- Manager: Aleksandar Ashadanov

=== Home ground ===
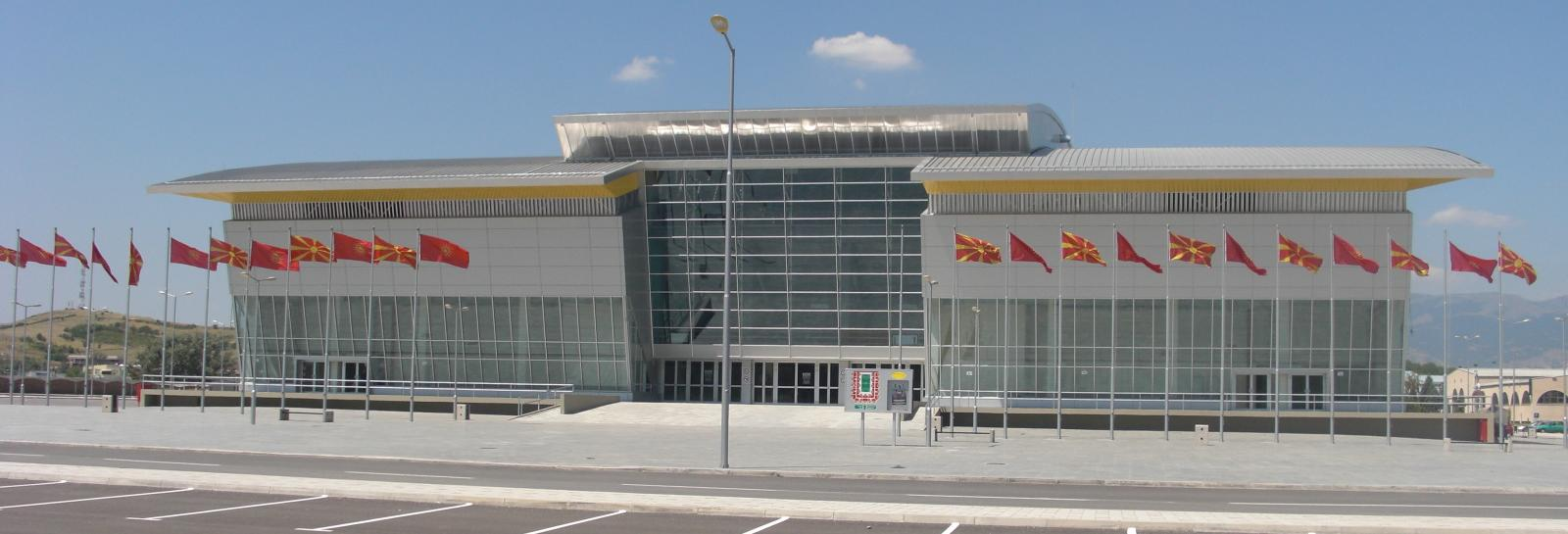
Home Ground

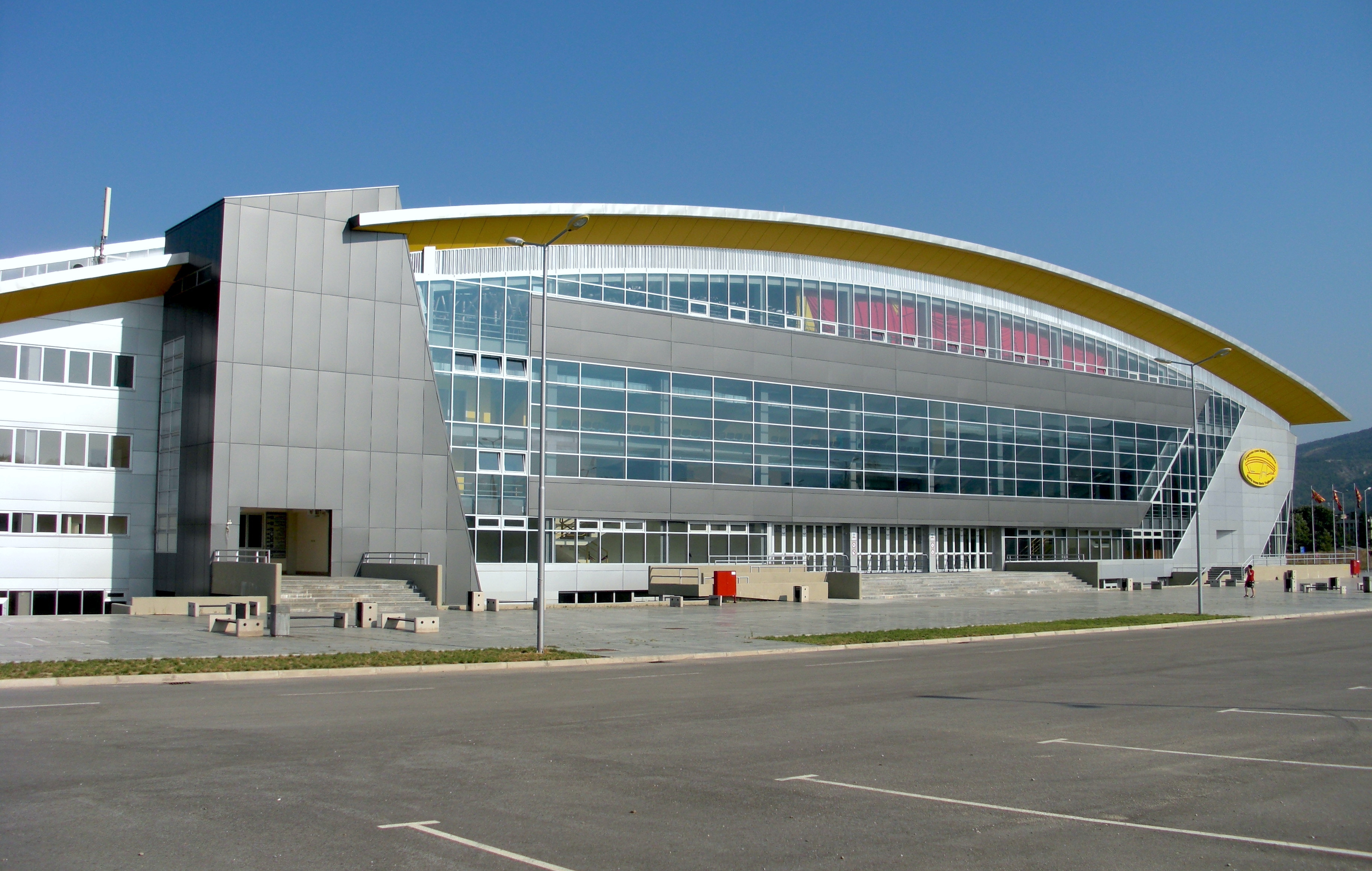
Home Ground

The BTSC – Boris Trajkovski Sports Center Macedonian: Спортски центар Борис Трајковски, Skopje is a multi-functional indoor sports arena. It is located in the Karpoš Municipality of Skopje, Macedonia. It is named after the former president, Boris Trajkovski. Its capacity is 10,000. There is an Olympic size Swimming Pool and 5 Star Hotel Alexander Palace within the complex. Water Land Fun Park and Ice Skating Rink are next to it.

The arena is a home-ground of the Macedonian basketball team (men and women). The venue also contains four restaurants and a sports bar.
