= EuroBasket Women 2027 =

Europees kampioenschap basketbal vrouwen 2027 Championnat d'Europe féminin de basket-ball 2027 Basketball-Europameisterschaft der Damen 2027 Koripallon naisten Euroopan-mestaruuskilpailut 2027 Europamästerskapet i basket för damer 2027 2027 m. Europos moterų krepšinio čempionatas
- Dare to Dream

Tournament details
- Host countries: Belgium; Finland; Lithuania; Sweden
- Dates: 16–27 June
- Teams: 16 (from 1 confederation)
- Venues: 5 (in 5 host cities)

Official website
- Official website

The 2027 EuroBasket Women, commonly called EuroBasket Women 2027, will be the 41st edition of the biannual continental tournament in women's basketball, sanctioned by the FIBA Europe, for national women's basketball teams. It will be held from 16 to 27 June 2027. It will be co-hosted by Belgium, Finland, Sweden and Lithuania, with each country hosting for the first time. 36 games will be played across five venues in five cities. This will be the second FIBA Women's EuroBasket to be hosted by four countries, copying the hosting format used for the men's EuroBasket since 2015. The final will be in Lithuania's capital, Vilnius. The tournament will involve 16 teams, with the four co-hosts qualifying automatically.

The top six teams will qualify for the 2028 FIBA Women's Olympic Qualifying Tournaments to try and participate in the Basketball at the 2028 Summer Olympics in Los Angeles.

Belgium are the two-time defending champions.

== Bidding process ==
- Lithuania and Finland (Vilnius, Klaipėda and Espoo)

Finland and Lithuania were confirmed as hosts on 24 November 2023 at the FIBA Europe Board in Mies, Switzerland. Although, FIBA Europe stated the possibility of a potential third and fourth being involved, similar to 2025.

On 22 March 2024, FIBA Europe stated that several countries have expressed an interest in becoming a co-host and confirmed the additional hosts will be announced in November 2024.

On 13 August 2024, three more countries applied to become co-hosts:

- Belgium (At the Sportpaleis in Antwerp)
- Slovakia (At the Gopass Aréna in Bratislava)
- Sweden (At the Avicii Arena in Stockholm)

On 28 November 2024 at the FIBA Europe Board in Istanbul, Turkey, the last two co-host spots were awarded to Belgium and Sweden.

== Venues ==
The tournament is expected to take place in five venues across five cities. Four cities are scheduled to organize one group, while the final round will be played in Vilnius. Belgium's federation has stated that they want to increase the capacity of the Sportpaleis to 20,000 for the tournament.

- In Belgium, the Sportpaleis will be used for the event. The historical venue has hosted the 2013 and 2023 World Artistic Gymnastics Championships while basketball related, it hosted the 2019 Basketball Champions League Final Four and one of the groups in the 2024 FIBA Women's Olympic Qualifying Tournaments.
- In Finland, the Espoo Metro Areena will hold games for the competition. Events the facility has hosted are the 2019 IIHF Women's World Championship, 2022 World Ringette Championships and 2023 European Figure Skating Championships.
- In Lithuania, the Švyturys Arena in Klaipėda and Twinsbet Arena in the capital Vilnius will organise matches for the tournament. Both venues hosted EuroBasket 2011 and 2021 FIFA Futsal World Cup. Separately, the Švyturys Arena hosted the 2013 FIBA Under-19 World Championship for Women and many Klaipėda based teams. The Twinsbet Arena hosted the 2010 FIBA Europe Under-18 Championship and has hosted numerous high profile concerts as well.
- In Sweden, the Avicii Arena will hold their games. It has organised five Ice Hockey World Championships and the 1989 Men's European Volleyball Championship. Outside of sport, it also hosted the Eurovision Song Contest in 2000 and 2016.

(Belgium) Antwerp	EuroBasket Women 2027 is located in Europe	(Finland) Espoo
Sportpaleis; Capacity: 18,575	EuroBasket Women 2027 is located in Europe	Espoo Metro Areena; Capacity: 8,500
(Sweden) Stockholm	EuroBasket Women 2027 is located in Europe	(Lithuania) Vilnius
Avicii Arena; Capacity: 16,000	EuroBasket Women 2027 is located in Europe	Twinsbet Arena; Capacity: 10,000
(Lithuania) Klaipėda	EuroBasket Women 2027 is located in Europe	
Švyturys Arena; Capacity: 6,200	EuroBasket Women 2027 is located in Europe	

== Preparations ==
=== Handover ceremony ===
Handover ceremony in Athens

The Handover ceremony took place on 29 June 2025 at the Peace and Friendship Stadium in Piraeus during the third place match between France and Italy. The hosts of the 2025 tournament, were represented by as follows:

- Zdenek Briza, vice president of the Czech Basketball Federation.
- Armin Andres, vice president of the German Basketball Federation.
- Maurizio Bertea, secretary general of the Italian Basketball Federation.
- Evangelos Liolios, president of the Hellenic Basketball Federation.

All four 2025 representatives did the symbolic handover to the 2027 hosts, who were represented by as follows:

- Vydas Gedvilas, commissioner of the Lithuanian Basketball Federation.
- Anja Frey, secretary general of the Swedish Basketball Federation.
- Timo Elo, president of Basketball Finland.
- Stefan Garaleas Secretary General of Basketball Belgium.

=== Logo reveal ===
On 21 July 2025, the logo was unveiled. FIBA Europe Executive Director, Kamil Novak, is quoted saying:

In close cooperation with the four host nations, we've created a bold and contemporary identity that mirrors the spirit of women's basketball today and inspires our athletes to be bold, fearless and push the boundaries of what is possible.

In the same press release Dare to Dream was announced as the motto.

== Qualification ==
On 28 November 2024, FIBA Europe revamped the qualification process. The qualification will begin in November 2025 and end in February 2027.

As of 2027, this is the last time Luxembourg and Switzerland didn't qualify.

=== Qualified teams ===
Team	Qualification method	Date of qualification	Appearance(s)				Previous best performance (Note: Bold text indicates they hosted that edition.)	WR (Note: World ranking at start of tournament.)
Team	Qualification method	Date of qualification	Total	First	Last	Streak	Previous best performance	WR
Finland	Host nation	24 November 2023	6th	1952	1987	1	Eleventh place (1952, 1956)	TBD
Lithuania	Host nation	24 November 2023	13th	1938	2025	2	Champions (1997)	TBD
Belgium	Host nation	28 November 2024	16th	1950	2025	6	Champions (2023, 2025)	TBD
Sweden	Host nation	28 November 2024	10th	1978	2025	2	Sixth place (2019)	TBD

== Final standings ==
Qualified for the 2028 FIBA Women's Olympic Qualifying Tournaments

Rank	Team	Record
1st place, gold medalist(s)		
2nd place, silver medalist(s)		
3rd place, bronze medalist(s)		
4th		
Eliminated in the quarterfinals
5th		
6th		
7th		
8th		
Eliminated in the qualification for quarterfinals
9th		
10th		
11th		
12th		
Eliminated in the first round
13th		
14th		
15th		
16th		

== Marketing ==
On 21 July 2025, the logo was unveiled two days prior to the qualifiers draw.
