= EuroBasket Women 2025 =

European women's basketball tournament

Mistrovství Evropy v basketbalu žen 2025 Basketball-Europameisterschaft der Damen 2025 Campionato europeo femminile di pallacanestro 2025 Ευρωπαϊκό Πρωτάθλημα Καλαθοσφαίρισης Γυναικών 2025

Tournament details
- Host countries: Czechia; Germany; Italy; Greece
- Dates: 18–29 June
- Teams: 16 (from 1 confederation)
- Venues: 4 (in 4 host cities)

Final positions
- Champions: Belgium (2nd title)
- Runners-up: Spain
- Third place: Italy
- Fourth place: France

Tournament statistics
- Games played: 36
- Attendance: 92,851 (2,579 per game)
- MVP: (Belgium) Emma Meesseman
- Top scorer: (Slovenia) Jessica Shepard (22.7 ppg)

Official website
- Official website

The 2025 Women's European Basketball Championship, commonly called EuroBasket Women 2025, was the 40th edition of the biannual continental tournament in women's basketball, sanctioned by the FIBA Europe. It was held in Czechia, Germany, Italy and Greece from 18 to 29 June 2025. This was the first FIBA Women's EuroBasket to be hosted by four countries, copying the hosting format used for the men's EuroBasket since 2015. The tournament involved 16 teams, with the four co-hosts qualifying automatically. Portugal made their debut while Switzerland returned after 69 years.

The winner qualified for the 2026 FIBA Women's Basketball World Cup and the top five teams (including the winner) will qualify for one of the qualifying tournaments for the 2026 World Cup. Germany (as host) and Czechia (as winner of a Pre-Qualifying Tournament) had already qualified for the qualifying tournaments and should one or both of these teams finish in the qualifying positions, the next-best team(s) qualified instead.

Belgium were the defending champions. The Belgians would go undefeated and successfully defend their title with a 67–65 win over Spain, despite being down by 12 points with three minutes left. Belgium became the third country after Soviet Union and Spain to defend their title. Emma Meesseman won her second MVP award in a row, becoming the first player to win it twice. Mariona Ortiz received the best defensive player award while Justė Jocytė won the rising star award, given to the best young player.

The tournament broke many records on and off the court and was deemed a big success by FIBA Europe. This edition broke the attendance record with 92,851 fans at games. This edition also broke the single game attendance record for the 21st century as Greece's do or die game against Turkey in Piraeus would garner 10,503 spectators, breaking the record previously held by the quarterfinal game between Russia vs Latvia in 2009. On the field, Italy won their first medal the 30 years while Germany and Slovenia achieved their best ever result with fifth and ninth respectively. France's win 111–37 over Switzerland was the biggest winning margin in 49 years.

== Bidding process ==
The following countries applied:

- Czechia – Czechia decided to file a late bid for the event after discussions with the Italian and German federations. Their host city is Brno. Czechia hosted the tournament in 1995 and 2017.
- Germany – Germany is vying to host the EuroBasket Women for the first time ever, with Hamburg as their host city. Despite Germany never hosting the EuroBasket Women, Germany have hosted the men's EuroBasket five times and will host the 2026 FIBA Women's Basketball World Cup.
- Greece – In December 2021, the Greek federation announced their intent to bid for the hosting rights after a meeting with Andreas Zagklis. This would be their second time hosting, having held it in 2003.
- Italy – On 14 July, the Italian Basketball Federation announced that they would bid for the hosting rights. This would be their eighth time hosting, after 1938, 1968, 1974, 1981, 1985, 1993 and 2007.
- Romania – In March 2023, the president of the Romanian Basketball Federation, Carmen Tocală, said that they intend to apply to host Group games in a new 5,000 capacity multi-complex arena in Constanța. This would be their third time hosting, after 1966 and 2015.

On 7 September 2023, FIBA announced that the Czechia (Brno), Germany (Hamburg), Greece (Piraeus) and Italy (unknown city) will host the tournament. Each country will host a group and the final round is scheduled to take place in Athens, Greece. Bologna was selected as the host city for Italy on 11 December 2023, while on the same day, the final round was relocated from Athens to Piraeus.

== Qualification ==
Map of qualifiers for the 2025 EuroBasket Women: Team qualified for 2025 EuroBasket Women Team failed to qualify Team banned from competition Did not enter

32 teams took part in qualification, while the four co-hosts played in a separate group for preparation reasons. The 32 teams were divided into eight groups of four, with the eight group winners plus the four best second place teams qualifying. The draw took place on 19 September 2023 in Munich, Germany. Qualification began on 9 November 2023 and ended on 9 February 2025.

Of the sixteen qualified teams, 12 were present in the previous edition. Portugal made their debut at this edition, marking the first time since EuroBasket Women 2017 that a team debuted at the tournament. Regarding the returnees, Switzerland qualified for the first time ever and will return after a 69 year absence, breaking the record for the longest time between edition appearances. Lithuania comes back after failing to qualify since 2015, while Sweden returns after missing out on 2023. Both Lithuania and Sweden, alongside defending champions Belgium, will all co-host the 2027 edition, with Finland being the only co-host not to qualify.

The most notable absentee is Hungary, who placed fourth in 2023 and narrowly missed out in the 2024 Olympics, Hungary's failure to qualify marks the fourth time in a row that the fourth place team from the previous tournament fails to make the next edition. Slovakia, who were present at the last two editions in 2021 and 2023 also failed to qualify. Latvia, plus 2023 co-host Israel, also failed to advance after taking part in the 2023 competition.

Montenegro, Slovenia and Turkey all continue their perfect record of qualifying for every tournament since their debut. The first teams to qualify were Sweden and Turkey, who both qualified in November 2024.

As of 2027, this the last time Switzerland qualified and the last time Finland failed to qualify.

=== Qualified teams ===
Team	Qualification method	Date of qualification	App	First	Last	Streak	Best placement in tournament	WR (Note: World ranking at start of tournament.)
Czechia	Host nation	8 September 2023	16th	1995	2023	16	Champions (2005)	21
Germany	Host nation	8 September 2023	17th	1954	2023	2	Third place (1997)	13
Greece	Host nation	8 September 2023	11th	2001	2023	2	Fourth place (2017)	18
Italy	Host nation	8 September 2023	35th	1938	2023	7	Champions (1938)	16
Sweden	Group D winner	10 November 2024	9th	1978	2021	1	Sixth place (2019)	27
Turkey	Group F winner	10 November 2024	11th	2005	2023	11	Runners-up (2011)	17
France	Group E winner	6 February 2025	35th	1938	2023	14	Champions (2001, 2009)	3
Spain	Group A winner	6 February 2025	23th	1974	2023	13	Champions (1993, 2013, 2017, 2019)	5
Serbia	Group G winner	6 February 2025	11th	2003	2023	7	Champions (2015, 2021)	9
Belgium	Group C winner	9 February 2025	15th	1950	2023	5	Champions (2023)	6
Great Britain	Four best runners up	9 February 2025	6th	2011	2023	2	Fourth place (2019)	23
Lithuania	Four best runners up	9 February 2025	12th	1938	2015	1	Champions (1997)	45
Montenegro	Group H winner	9 February 2025	8th	2011	2023	8	Sixth place (2011)	22
Portugal	Four best runners up	9 February 2025	1st	Debut				46
Slovenia	Group B winner	9 February 2025	5th	2017	2023	5	Tenth place (2019, 2021)	25
Switzerland	Four best runners up	9 February 2025	5th	1938	1956	1	Fifth place (1938)	65

== Venues ==
The tournament's four cities are Bologna, Brno, Hamburg and Piraeus. Brno was the only venue to undergo renovations for the tournament. Each city is scheduled to organise one group, with the final round was to be played in Piraeus. This is Germany's first time hosting the event and the second, third and eighth to be hosted in Greece, Czechia and Italy respectively.

- In Czechia, the Sportovní hala Vodova was used for the event. The venue previously hosted the 1998 Men's World Floorball Championships, 2010 FIBA World Championship for Women and in the near future, the 2025 Women's World Floorball Championships. The venue has also hosted numerous basketball, floorball, handball and volleyball youth championships. The facility is also used for KP Brno and Žabiny Brno in the EuroLeague Women and EuroCup Women.
- In Germany, the Inselpark Arena held games for the competition. The venue is home to the Hamburg Towers and has organised the 2018 Wheelchair Basketball World Championship and some editions of the invitational basketball tournament, the Basketball Supercup.
- In Italy, the PalaDozza organised matches for the tournament. The 2018 FIVB Men's Volleyball World Championship took place in this arena. Basketball team, Fortitudo Bologna plays their games here. In the past, the venue has hosted various other Bologna-based teams and is used for concerts.
- In Greece, the Peace and Friendship Stadium held their games. The venue was built in 1985 but was heavily transformed for the 2004 Summer Olympics where it hosted indoor volleyball. The venue has also organised many prestigious World and European championship. When not hosting marquee events, Olympiacos uses the arena for their games in numerous sports.

(Greece) Piraeus	EuroBasket Women 2025 is located in Europe	(Italy) Bologna
Peace and Friendship Stadium; Capacity: 11,640	EuroBasket Women 2025 is located in Europe	PalaDozza; Capacity: 5,570
Hamburg	EuroBasket Women 2025 is located in Europe	(Czech Republic) Brno
Inselpark Arena; Capacity: 3,400	EuroBasket Women 2025 is located in Europe	Sportovní hala Vodova; Capacity: 3,000

=== Allocation of groups ===
On 27 May 2024 in Munich, following a request by the four host nations, FIBA organised a draw to allocate each host a group. The results of the draw as are follows:

- Group A will play in Piraeus, Greece.
- Group B will play in Bologna, Italy.
- Group C will play in Brno, Czechia.
- Group D will play in Hamburg, Germany.

== Final draw ==
The Stavros Niarchos Foundation Cultural Center in Athens will host the draw.

The final draw took place at 19:00 CET on 8 March 2025 at the Stavros Niarchos Foundation Cultural Center in Athens, Greece. Journalist Lila Kountourioti and actress Yioulika Skafida hosted the draw. Basketball players, Dimitris Diamantidis and Sandrine Gruda, were the guests who assisted the draw. The draw started with the co-hosts being placed into their respective groups and continued with, in order, pots 4, 3, 2 and 1 being drawn, with each team selected then allocated into the first available group alphabetically. The position for the team within the group would then be drawn (for the purpose of the schedule).

=== Seeding ===
On 19 February 2025, the seeding for the draw was announced. The seeding was based on the FIBA Women's World Ranking as of 14 February 2025.

Pot 1
Team	Rank
France	3
Spain	5
Belgium	6
Serbia	8

Pot 2
Team	Rank
Germany (H)	13
Italy (H)	15
Turkey	17
Czechia (H)	18

Pot 3
Team	Rank
Montenegro	19
Great Britain	20
Greece (H)	21
Slovenia	22

Pot 4
Team	Rank
Sweden	25
Portugal	40
Lithuania	45
Switzerland	49

=== Draw ===
Group A
Pos	Team
A1	Greece
A2	Turkey
A3	France
A4	Switzerland

Group B
Pos	Team
B1	Slovenia
B2	Serbia
B3	Italy
B4	Lithuania

Group C
Pos	Team
C1	Belgium
C2	Czechia
C3	Montenegro
C4	Portugal

Group D
Pos	Team
D1	Great Britain
D2	Germany
D3	Sweden
D4	Spain

=== Schedule ===
Schedule
Round	Gameday	Date
Preliminary round	Gameday 1	18–19 July 2025
Preliminary round	Gameday 2	19–20 July 2025
Preliminary round	Gameday 3	21–22 July 2025
Final round	Quarter-finals	25 June 2025
Final round	Semi-finals	27 June 2025
Final round	Final	29 June 2025

== Referees ==
The following 32 referees were selected for the tournament.

- (Belgium) Geert Jacobs
- (Bulgaria) Martin Horozov
- (Croatia) Josip Jurčević
- (Croatia) Jelena Tomić
- (Czech Republic) Ivor Matějek
- (France) Amal Dahra
- (France) Alexandre Deman
- (France) Valentin Oliot
- (Germany) Carsten Straube
- (Greece) Georgios Poursanidis
- (Hungary) Péter Praksch
- (Italy) Silvia Marziali
- (Latvia) Andris Aunkrogers
- (Latvia) Gatis Saliņš
- (Lithuania) Gvidas Gedvilas
- (Lithuania) Gintaras Mačiulis
- (Montenegro) Nataša Dragojević
- (Norway) Viola Györgyi
- (Panama) Julio Anaya
- (Poland) Paulina Gajdosz
- (Poland) ️Michał Proc
- (Poland) Dariusz Zapolski
- (Portugal) Paulo Marques
- (Serbia) Ivana Ivanović
- (Slovakia) Veronika Obertová
- (Slovakia) Zdenko Tomašovič
- (Slovenia) Blaž Zupančič
- (Spain) Yasmina Alcaraz
- (Spain) Ariadna Chueca
- (Spain) Sandra Sánchez
- (Turkey) Çisil Güngör
- (Turkey) Özlem Yalman

== Squads ==
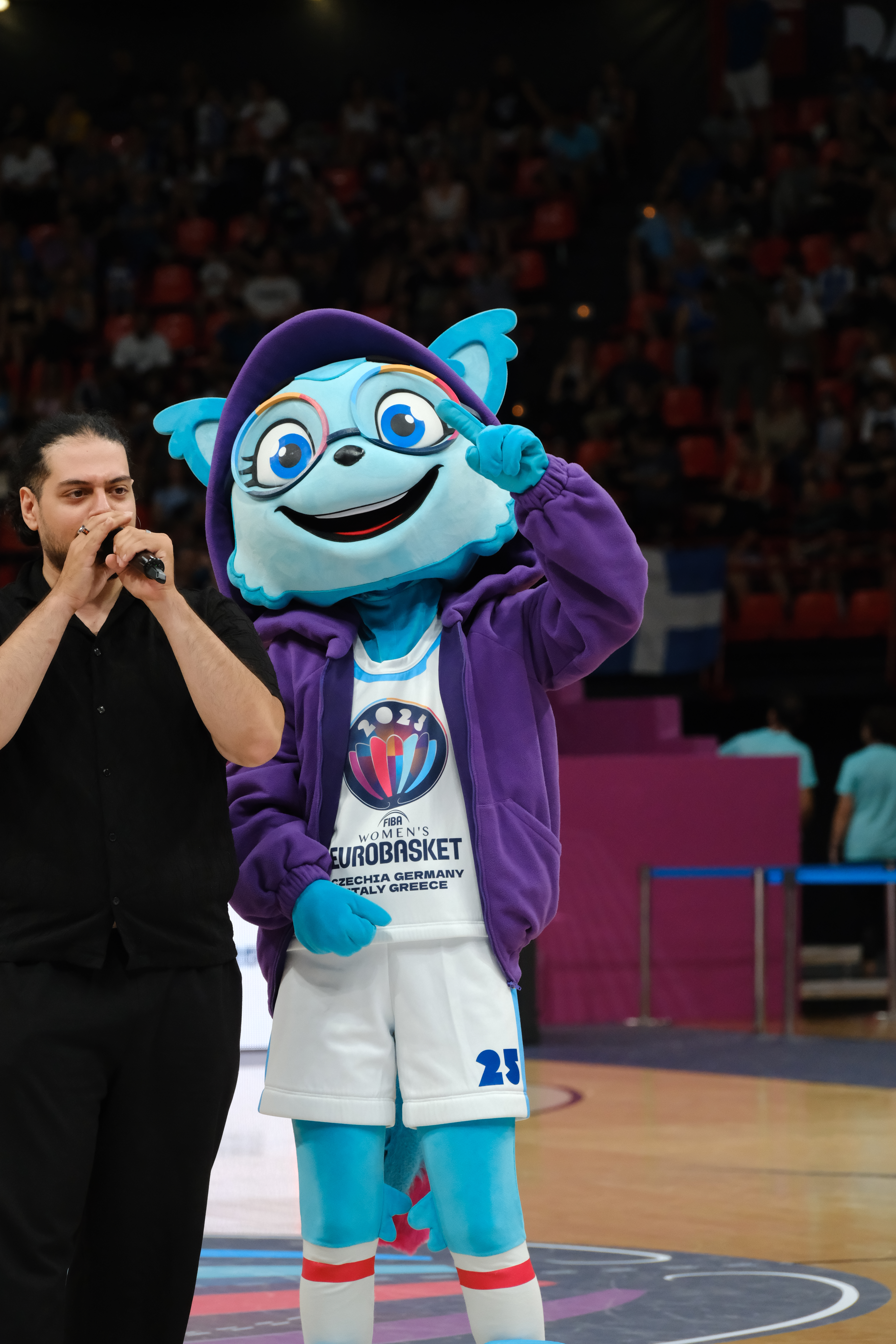
Fiona Mascot

Each nation has to submit a list of 12 players.

=== Notable players ===
The following players were the tallest, smallest, oldest and youngest players at the tournament.

Tallest player
(Turkey) Teaira McCowan
Smallest player
(Czech Republic) Kateřina Zeithammerová
Oldest player
(Germany) Romy Bär
Youngest player
(Serbia) Jovana Popović

== Preliminary round ==
=== Classification of teams ===
1. Highest number of points earned, with each game result having a corresponding point:
  - Win: 2 points
  - Loss: 1 point
  - Loss by default: 1 point, with a final score of 2–0 for the opponents of the defaulting team if the latter team is not trailing or if the score is tied, or the score at the time of stoppage if they are trailing.
  - Loss by forfeit: 0 points, with a final score of 20–0 for the opponents of the forfeiting team.
2. Head-to-head record via points system above
3. Point difference in games among tied teams
4. Points for in games among tied teams
5. Point difference in all group games
6. Points for in all group games

=== Group A ===
Pos	Team	Pld	W	L	PF	PA	PD	Pts	Qualification
1	France	3	3	0	274	162	+112	6	Knockout stage
2	Turkey	3	2	1	243	210	+33	5	Knockout stage
3	Greece (H)	3	1	2	215	240	−25	4	
4	Switzerland	3	0	3	169	289	−120	3	

Source: FIBA
Rules for classification: 1) Points; 2) Head-to-head results; 3) Points difference; 4) Points scored.
(H) Hosts

18 June 2025
16:30

Boxscore

Turkey	69–71	France
Scoring by quarter: 23–22, 21–14, 10–12, 15–23
Pts: McCowan 20; Rebs: McCowan 15; Asts: Çakır 5		Pts: Salaün 22; Rebs: Rupert 9 Asts: three players 4

Peace and Friendship Stadium, Piraeus
Attendance: 850
Referees: Ariadna Chueca (ESP), Geert Jacobs (BEL), Nataša Dragojević (MNE)

18 June 2025
19:30

Boxscore

Greece	87–65	Switzerland
Scoring by quarter: 19–19, 27–13, 18–12, 23–21
Pts: Fasoula 21; Rebs: Fasoula, Parks 6 Asts: Krimili, Spanou 6		Pts: Herminjard 18; Rebs: Schwarz 8 Asts: Herminjard 11

Peace and Friendship Stadium, Piraeus
Attendance: 6,895
Referees: Julio Anaya (PAN), Paulina Gajdosz (POL), Péter Praksch (HUN)

19 June 2025
16:30

Boxscore

Switzerland	67–91	Turkey
Scoring by quarter: 13–27, 21–24, 19–17, 14–23
Pts: Ranisavljevic 14; Rebs: Schwarz 6 Asts: Fora 6		Pts: McCowan 19; Rebs: McCowan 12; Asts: Onar 8

Peace and Friendship Stadium, Piraeus
Attendance: 550
Referees: Julio Anaya (PAN), Paulina Gajdosz (POL), Veronika Obertová (SVK)

19 June 2025
19:30

Boxscore

France	92–56	Greece
Scoring by quarter: 21–17, 23–20, 20–10, 28–9
Pts: Salaün 17; Rebs: Djaldi-Tabdi, Salaün 5 Asts: Bernies 8		Pts: Spanou 14; Rebs: Parks 7 Asts: Pavlopoulou 4

Peace and Friendship Stadium, Piraeus
Attendance: 8,860
Referees: Ariadna Chueca (ESP), Péter Praksch (HUN), Zdenko Tomašovič (SVK)

21 June 2025
16:30

Boxscore

France	111–37	Switzerland
Scoring by quarter: 25–9, 35–5, 22–15, 29–8
Pts: Salaün 23; Rebs: Ayayi, Rupert 6 Asts: Bernies, Touré 5		Pts: Herminjard 10; Rebs: Schwarz 9 Asts: Schwarz 3

Peace and Friendship Stadium, Piraeus
Attendance: 410
Referees: Geert Jacobs (BEL), Zdenko Tomašovič (SVK), Veronika Obertová (SVK)

21 June 2025
19:30

Boxscore

Greece	72–83	Turkey
Scoring by quarter: 21–17, 14–26, 24–19, 13–21
Pts: Spanou 20; Rebs: Spanou 5 Asts: Pavlopoulou 7		Pts: Şenyürek 19; Rebs: McCowan 14; Asts: Onar 8

Peace and Friendship Stadium, Piraeus
Attendance: 10,503
Referees: Ariadna Chueca (ESP), Julio Anaya (PAN), Péter Praksch (HUN)

=== Group B ===
Pos	Team	Pld	W	L	PF	PA	PD	Pts	Qualification
1	Italy (H)	3	3	0	212	178	+34	6	Knockout stage
2	Lithuania	3	2	1	202	199	+3	5	Knockout stage
3	Slovenia	3	1	2	221	223	−2	4	
4	Serbia	3	0	3	193	228	−35	3	

Source: FIBA
Rules for classification: 1) Points; 2) Head-to-head results; 3) Points difference; 4) Points scored.
(H) Hosts

18 June 2025
17:30

Boxscore

Slovenia	71–77	Lithuania
Scoring by quarter: 19–27, 15–15, 21–16, 16–19
Pts: Shepard 25; Rebs: Shepard 18; Asts: Oblak 5		Pts: Jocytė 17; Rebs: Juškaitė 9 Asts: Jocytė 6

PalaDozza, Bologna
Attendance: 636
Referees: Martin Horozov (BUL), Viola Györgyi (NOR), Ivor Matějek (CZE)

18 June 2025
21:00

Boxscore

Serbia	61–70	Italy
Scoring by quarter: 18–19, 12–20, 13–17, 18–14
Pts: Nogić 19; Rebs: Dugalić 7 Asts: Anderson 5		Pts: Zandalasini 20; Rebs: Zandalasini 11; Asts: Santucci, Zandalasini 4

PalaDozza, Bologna
Attendance: 2,601
Referees: Paulo Marques (POR), Yasmina Alcaraz (ESP), Michał Proc (POL)

19 June 2025
17:30

Boxscore

Lithuania	74–63	Serbia
Scoring by quarter: 16–14, 14–16, 24–19, 20–14
Pts: Juškaitė 24; Rebs: Juškaitė 9 Asts: Jocytė 6		Pts: Anderson, Nogić 13; Rebs: Dugalić 8 Asts: Popović 5

PalaDozza, Bologna
Attendance: 922
Referees: Martin Horozov (BUL), Carsten Straube (GER), Yasmina Alcaraz (ESP)

19 June 2025
21:00

Boxscore

Italy	77–66	Slovenia
Scoring by quarter: 22–17, 23–5, 16–26, 16–18
Pts: Keys, Pasa 15; Rebs: Cubaj 8 Asts: Verona 6		Pts: Shepard 20; Rebs: Shepard 6 Asts: Oblak 9

PalaDozza, Bologna
Attendance: 2,389
Referees: ️Michał Proc (POL), Paulo Marques (POR), Ivor Matějek (CZE)

21 June 2025
17:30

Boxscore

Slovenia	84–69	Serbia
Scoring by quarter: 30–23, 19–10, 20–18, 15–18
Pts: Shepard 23; Rebs: Lisec 11; Asts: Lisec 9		Pts: Dugalić 20; Rebs: three players 4 Asts: Katanić 6

PalaDozza, Bologna
Attendance: 1,543
Referees: Paulo Marques (POR), Carsten Straube (GER), Sandra Sánchez (ESP)

21 June 2025
21:00

Boxscore

Italy	65–51	Lithuania
Scoring by quarter: 18–14, 16–9, 12–19, 19–9
Pts: Zandalasini 22; Rebs: Zandalasini 9 Asts: Santucci 4		Pts: Jocytė 15; Rebs: Miškinienė 12; Asts: Jocytė, Juškaitė 3

PalaDozza, Bologna
Attendance: 3,893
Referees: Martin Horozov (BUL), Viola Györgyi (NOR), ️Michał Proc (POL)

=== Group C ===
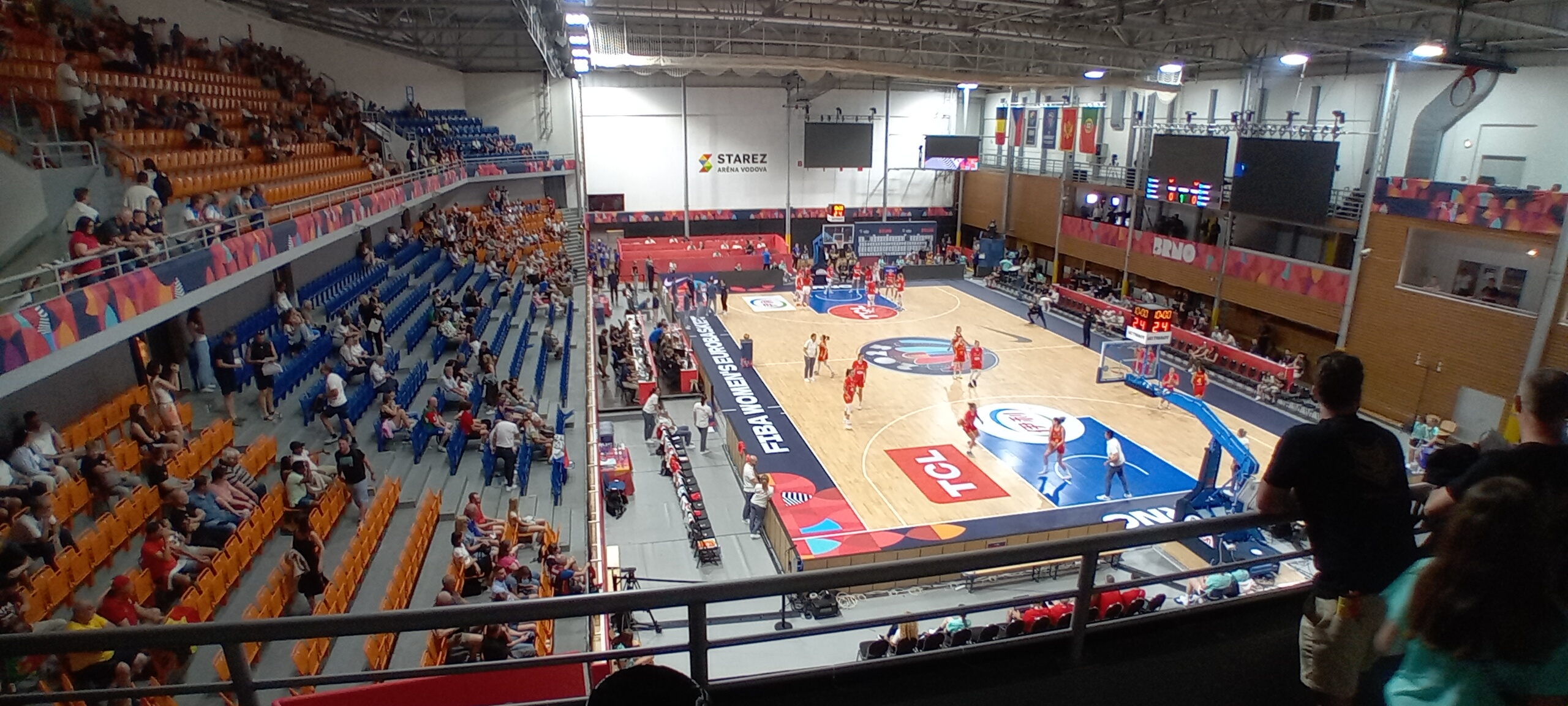
Czechia vs Montenegro at EuroBasket Women 2025 on 19 June 2025

Pos	Team	Pld	W	L	PF	PA	PD	Pts	Qualification
1	Belgium	3	3	0	240	165	+75	6	Knockout stage
2	Czechia (H)	3	2	1	222	168	+54	5	Knockout stage
3	Portugal	3	1	2	167	203	−36	4	
4	Montenegro	3	0	3	146	239	−93	3	

Source: FIBA
Rules for classification: 1) Points; 2) Head-to-head results; 3) Points difference; 4) Points scored.
(H) Hosts

19 June 2025
17:30 (Note: Due to a major power outage in the area around the arena, both games were significantly delayed.)

Boxscore

Czechia	89–44	Montenegro
Scoring by quarter: 24–13, 21–10, 21–10, 23–11
Pts: Reisingerová 14; Rebs: Čechová 8 Asts: Voráčková, Zeithammerová 5		Pts: Kovačević 8 Rebs: Kovačević 5 Asts: Jovanović, Kovačević 3

Sportovní hala Vodova, Brno
Attendance: 2,267
Referees: Gatis Saliņš (LAT), Silvia Marziali (ITA), Gintaras Mačiulis (LTU)

19 June 2025
21:00 (Note: Due to a major power outage in the area around the arena, both games were significantly delayed.)

Boxscore

Belgium	81–52	Portugal
Scoring by quarter: 15–14, 25–11, 26–11, 15–16
Pts: Meesseman 19; Rebs: Meesseman 11; Asts: Meesseman 6		Pts: Rodrigues 13; Rebs: Correia, S. da Silva 6 Asts: Correia 4

Sportovní hala Vodova, Brno
Attendance: 1,192
Referees: Georgios Poursanidis (GRE), Özlem Yalman (TUR), Josip Jurčević (CRO)

20 June 2025
17:30

Boxscore

Portugal	52–73	Czechia
Scoring by quarter: 11–19, 8–21, 18–17, 15–16
Pts: S. da Silva 12; Rebs: Soeiro 6 Asts: Bettencourt, Soeiro 4		Pts: Reisingerová 11; Rebs: Pospíšilová, Voráčková 5 Asts: Voráčková 7

Sportovní hala Vodova, Brno
Attendance: 2,556
Referees: Georgios Poursanidis (GRE), Valentin Oliot (FRA), Gintaras Mačiulis (LTU)

20 June 2025
20:15

Boxscore

Montenegro	53–87	Belgium
Scoring by quarter: 8–31, 24–17, 13–15, 8–24
Pts: Kovačević 16; Rebs: four players 4 Asts: three players 3		Pts: Linskens 25; Rebs: Linskens 8 Asts: Vanloo 7

Sportovní hala Vodova, Brno
Attendance: 1,286
Referees: Silvia Marziali (ITA), Özlem Yalman (TUR), Amal Dahra (FRA)

22 June 2025
17:30

Boxscore

Belgium	72–60	Czechia
Scoring by quarter: 17–17, 24–20, 17–9, 14–14
Pts: Meesseman 20; Rebs: Allemand 9 Asts: Allemand 8		Pts: Voráčková 11; Rebs: Hamzová 6 Asts: Hamzová, Pospíšilová 5

Sportovní hala Vodova, Brno
Attendance: 2,708
Referees: Georgios Poursanidis (GRE), Özlem Yalman (TUR), Gatis Saliņš (LAT)

22 June 2025
20:15

Boxscore

Montenegro	49–63	Portugal
Scoring by quarter: 11–14, 13–16, 12–18, 13–15
Pts: Jovanović 13; Rebs: Jovanović 6 Asts: three players 4		Pts: Correia 15; Rebs: S. da Silva 10; Asts: Da Costa, Rodrigues 5

Sportovní hala Vodova, Brno
Attendance: 1,056
Referees: Josip Jurčević (CRO), Amal Dahra (FRA), Valentin Oliot (FRA)

=== Group D ===
Pos	Team	Pld	W	L	PF	PA	PD	Pts	Qualification
1	Spain	3	3	0	242	205	+37	6	Knockout stage
2	Germany (H)	3	2	1	229	222	+7	5	Knockout stage
3	Sweden	3	1	2	226	233	−7	4	
4	Great Britain	3	0	3	203	240	−37	3	

Source: FIBA
Rules for classification: 1) Points; 2) Head-to-head results; 3) Points difference; 4) Points scored.
(H) Hosts

19 June 2025
17:15

Boxscore

Great Britain	70–85	Spain
Scoring by quarter: 13–18, 12–30, 24–20, 21–17
Pts: Ashby 17; Rebs: Fagbenle 8 Asts: Winterburn 6		Pts: Martín 14; Rebs: Ortiz 5 Asts: Ortiz 7

Inselpark Arena, Hamburg
Attendance: 3,087
Referees: Dariusz Zapolski (POL), Ivana Ivanović (SRB), Blaž Zupančič (SLO)

19 June 2025
20:00

Boxscore

Germany	89–76	Sweden
Scoring by quarter: 27–16, 17–11, 14–22, 31–27
Pts: Geiselsöder 20; Rebs: Bühner 10; Asts: Peterson 6		Pts: Eldebrink 22; Rebs: Wadling 10; Asts: Lundquist 5

Inselpark Arena, Hamburg
Attendance: 3,414
Referees: Gvidas Gedvilas (LTU), Andris Aunkrogers (LAT), Çisil Güngör (TUR)

20 June 2025
17:15

Boxscore

Sweden	75–66	Great Britain
Scoring by quarter: 15–22, 16–9, 26–16, 18–19
Pts: Lundquist 20; Rebs: Lundquist 11; Asts: Lundquist 6		Pts: Winterburn 19; Rebs: Winterburn 9 Asts: Winterburn 7

Inselpark Arena, Hamburg
Attendance: 3,164
Referees: Dariusz Zapolski (POL), Jelena Tomić (CRO), Alexandre Deman (FRA)

20 June 2025
20:00

Boxscore

Spain	79–60	Germany
Scoring by quarter: 19–16, 17–14, 18–13, 25–17
Pts: Carrera 20; Rebs: Araújo, Torrens 7 Asts: Ortiz 7		Pts: Geiselsöder 16; Rebs: Fiebich 9 Asts: Peterson 7

Inselpark Arena, Hamburg
Attendance: 3,414
Referees: Andris Aunkrogers (LAT), Gvidas Gedvilas (LTU), Çisil Güngör (TUR)

22 June 2025
15:15

Boxscore

Sweden	75–78 (OT)	Spain
Scoring by quarter: 16–16, 7–15, 19–19, 22–14, Overtime: 11–14
Pts: Lundquist 21; Rebs: Lundquist 9 Asts: Lundquist 8		Pts: Torrens 20; Rebs: Ortiz 6 Asts: Buenavida, Fam 3

Inselpark Arena, Hamburg
Attendance: 3,223
Referees: Dariusz Zapolski (POL), Alexandre Deman (FRA), Çisil Güngör (TUR)

22 June 2025
18:00

Boxscore

Great Britain	67–80	Germany
Scoring by quarter: 8–26, 24–22, 20–15, 15–17
Pts: Winterburn 18; Rebs: Henderson 10; Asts: Henderson, Winterburn 6		Pts: Bühner 17; Rebs: Bühner, Geiselsöder 7 Asts: Peterson 8

Inselpark Arena, Hamburg
Attendance: 3,414
Referees: Andris Aunkrogers (LAT), Gvidas Gedvilas (LTU), Blaž Zupančič (SLO)

== Knockout stage ==
The final round was the knockout stage of the competition. It took place from 25 to 29 June 2025 and consisted of the top-two teams from Groups A, B, C and D. The round was played in a single-elimination tournament, with all games played at the Peace and Friendship Stadium, Piraeus, Greece. Teams that lost in the quarter-finals would go to the classification stage and play for places 5 to 8.

=== Bracket ===
Quarterfinals
24 June
France	83
Lithuania	61
25 June
Spain	88
Czechia	81
24 June
Italy (OT)	76
Turkey	74
25 June
Belgium	83
Germany	59

Semifinals
27 June
France	64
Spain	65
27 June
Italy	64
Belgium	66

Final
29 June
Spain	65
Belgium	67
Third place game
29 June
France	54
Italy	69

Classification games
27 June
Lithuania	76
Czechia	81
27 June
Turkey	73
Germany	93

Fifth place game
29 June
Czechia	70
Germany	81
Seventh place game
29 June
Lithuania	87
Turkey	99

=== Quarterfinals ===
24 June 2025
17:30

Boxscore

France	83–61	Lithuania
Scoring by quarter: 35–14, 21–17, 15–14, 12–16
Pts: Rupert 15; Rebs: Badiane 7 Asts: Bernies 7		Pts: Juškaitė 16; Rebs: Juškaitė 8 Asts: Donskichytė 3

Peace and Friendship Stadium, Piraeus
Attendance: 755
Referees: Georgios Poursanidis (GRE), Paulina Gajdosz (POL), Paulo Marques (POR)

24 June 2025
20:30

Boxscore

Italy	76–74 (OT)	Turkey
Scoring by quarter: 20–17, 11–18, 19–15, 18–18, Overtime: 8–6
Pts: Cubaj 16; Rebs: Cubaj 7 Asts: Verona 7		Pts: Uzun 20; Rebs: Şenyürek 11; Asts: Onar, Uzun 5

Peace and Friendship Stadium, Piraeus
Attendance: 1,020
Referees: Ariadna Chueca (ESP), Gvidas Gedvilas (LTU), Gatis Saliņš (LAT)

25 June 2025
17:30

Boxscore

Spain	88–81	Czechia
Scoring by quarter: 12–18, 21–26, 28–22, 27–15
Pts: Carrera 31; Rebs: Carrera, Torrens 8 Asts: Ayuso, Ortiz 5		Pts: Holešínská 23; Rebs: Čechová 8 Asts: Holešínská 6

Peace and Friendship Stadium, Piraeus
Attendance: 733
Referees: Martin Horozov (BUL), Silvia Marziali (ITA), Péter Praksch (HUN)

25 June 2025
20:30

Boxscore

Belgium	83–59	Germany
Scoring by quarter: 21–21, 20–15, 24–17, 18–6
Pts: Meesseman 30; Rebs: Linskens 10; Asts: Vanloo 8		Pts: Bühner, Geiselsöder 13; Rebs: Geiselsöder 6 Asts: Peterson 6

Peace and Friendship Stadium, Piraeus
Attendance: 1,230
Referees: Andris Aunkrogers (LAT), Julio Anaya (PAN), Viola Györgyi (NOR)

=== Classification games ===
27 June 2025
11:45

Boxscore

Lithuania	76–81	Czechia
Scoring by quarter: 17–19, 17–23, 26–21, 16–18
Pts: Šventoraitė 21; Rebs: Juškaitė 14; Asts: Juškaitė 6		Pts: Pospíšilová 15; Rebs: Čechová 9 Asts: Pospíšilová 5

Peace and Friendship Stadium, Piraeus
Attendance: 246
Referees: Ariadna Chueca (ESP), Paulo Marques (POR), Josip Jurčević (CRO)

27 June 2025
14:30

Boxscore

Turkey	73–93	Germany
Scoring by quarter: 15–23, 13–27, 24–23, 21–20
Pts: Şenyürek 15; Rebs: Şenyürek 10; Asts: Uzun 4		Pts: Bühner 19; Rebs: Fiebich 8 Asts: Bühner 7

Peace and Friendship Stadium, Piraeus
Referees: Andris Aunkrogers (LAT), Paulina Gajdosz (POL), Dariusz Zapolski (POL)

=== Semifinals ===
27 June 2025
17:30

Boxscore

France	64–65	Spain
Scoring by quarter: 18–18, 20–13, 8–18, 18–16
Pts: Ayayi 19; Rebs: Salaün 5 Asts: Bernies 7		Pts: Fam 21; Rebs: Fam 9 Asts: Torrens 7

Peace and Friendship Stadium, Piraeus
Attendance: 2,495
Referees: Gatis Saliņš (LAT), Julio Anaya (PAN), Martin Horozov (BUL)

27 June 2025
20:30

Boxscore

Italy	64–66	Belgium
Scoring by quarter: 20–17, 13–23, 10–17, 21–9
Pts: Cubaj 13; Rebs: Cubaj 10; Asts: Santucci, Zandalasini 4		Pts: Meesseman, Vanloo 15; Rebs: Meesseman 12; Asts: Vanloo 8

Peace and Friendship Stadium, Piraeus
Attendance: 4,121
Referees: Georgios Poursanidis (GRE), Péter Praksch (HUN), Çisil Güngör (TUR)

=== Seventh place game ===
29 June 2025
10:45

Boxscore

Lithuania	87–99	Turkey
Scoring by quarter: 21–26, 25–26, 28–21, 13–26
Pts: Juškaitė 26; Rebs: Juškaitė 8 Asts: Jocytė 8		Pts: Bilgiç, Uzun 22; Rebs: McCowan 9 Asts: Uzun 7

Peace and Friendship Stadium, Piraeus
Attendance: 238
Referees: Martin Horozov (BUL), Paulo Marques (POR), Dariusz Zapolski (POL)

=== Fifth place game ===
29 June 2025
13:30

Boxscore

Czechia	70–81	Germany
Scoring by quarter: 15–13, 17–24, 23–23, 15–21
Pts: Reisingerová, Voráčková 14; Rebs: Hamzová, Reisingerová 6 Asts: Holešínská, Voráčková 4		Pts: Fiebich 20; Rebs: Bessoir 10; Asts: Geiselsöder 8

Peace and Friendship Stadium, Piraeus
Attendance: 230
Referees: Viola Györgyi (NOR), Çisil Güngör (TUR), Amal Dahra (FRA)

=== Third place game ===
29 June 2025
16:30

Boxscore

France	54–69	Italy
Scoring by quarter: 22–23, 14–19, 9–11, 9–16
Pts: Touré 13; Rebs: Ayayi, Badiane 5 Asts: Bernies 3		Pts: Zandalasini 20; Rebs: André 6 Asts: Verona 5

Peace and Friendship Stadium, Piraeus
Attendance: 3,123
Referees: Ariadna Chueca (ESP), Julio Anaya (PAN), Gvidas Gedvilas (LTU)

=== Final ===
29 June 2025
19:30

Boxscore

Spain	65–67	Belgium
Scoring by quarter: 19–18, 18–13, 15–18, 13–18
Pts: three players 11; Rebs: Torrens 5 Asts: Fam, Ortiz 4		Pts: Allemand 19; Rebs: Meesseman 11; Asts: Meesseman 7

Peace and Friendship Stadium, Piraeus
Attendance: 7,827
Referees: Gatis Saliņš (LAT), Paulina Gajdosz (POL), Péter Praksch (HUN)

== Final standings ==
Pos	Team	Pld	W	L	PF	PA	PD	Pts	Qualification
1st place, gold medalist(s)	Belgium	6	6	0	456	342	+114	12	Qualified for the 2026 FIBA Women's Basketball World Cup and Qualifying Tournaments
2nd place, silver medalist(s)	Spain	6	5	1	460	417	+43	11	Qualified for the Qualifying Tournaments
3rd place, bronze medalist(s)	Italy	6	5	1	421	372	+49	11	Qualified for the Qualifying Tournaments
4	France	6	4	2	475	357	+118	10	Qualified for the Qualifying Tournaments
5	Germany (Note: Germany qualified for the 2026 FIBA Women's Basketball World Cup as hosts.)	6	4	2	462	448	+14	10	Qualified for the 2026 FIBA Women's Basketball World Cup and Qualifying Tournaments
6	Czechia	6	3	3	454	413	+41	9	Qualified for the Qualifying Tournaments
7	Turkey	6	3	3	489	466	+23	9	Qualified for the Qualifying Tournaments
8	Lithuania	6	2	4	426	462	−36	8	
9	Slovenia	3	1	2	221	223	−2	4	
10	Sweden	3	1	2	226	233	−7	4	
11	Greece	3	1	2	215	240	−25	4	
12	Portugal	3	1	2	167	203	−36	4	
13	Serbia	3	0	3	193	228	−35	3	
14	Great Britain	3	0	3	203	240	−37	3	
15	Montenegro	3	0	3	146	239	−93	3	
16	Switzerland	3	0	3	169	289	−120	3	

Source: FIBA
Rules for classification: 1) Positions in each group; 2) Win / Loss ratio; 3) Points difference; 4) Points scored; 5) Drawing of lots.

== Awards ==
FIBA Women's EuroBasket 2025 Champions
Belgium
2nd title

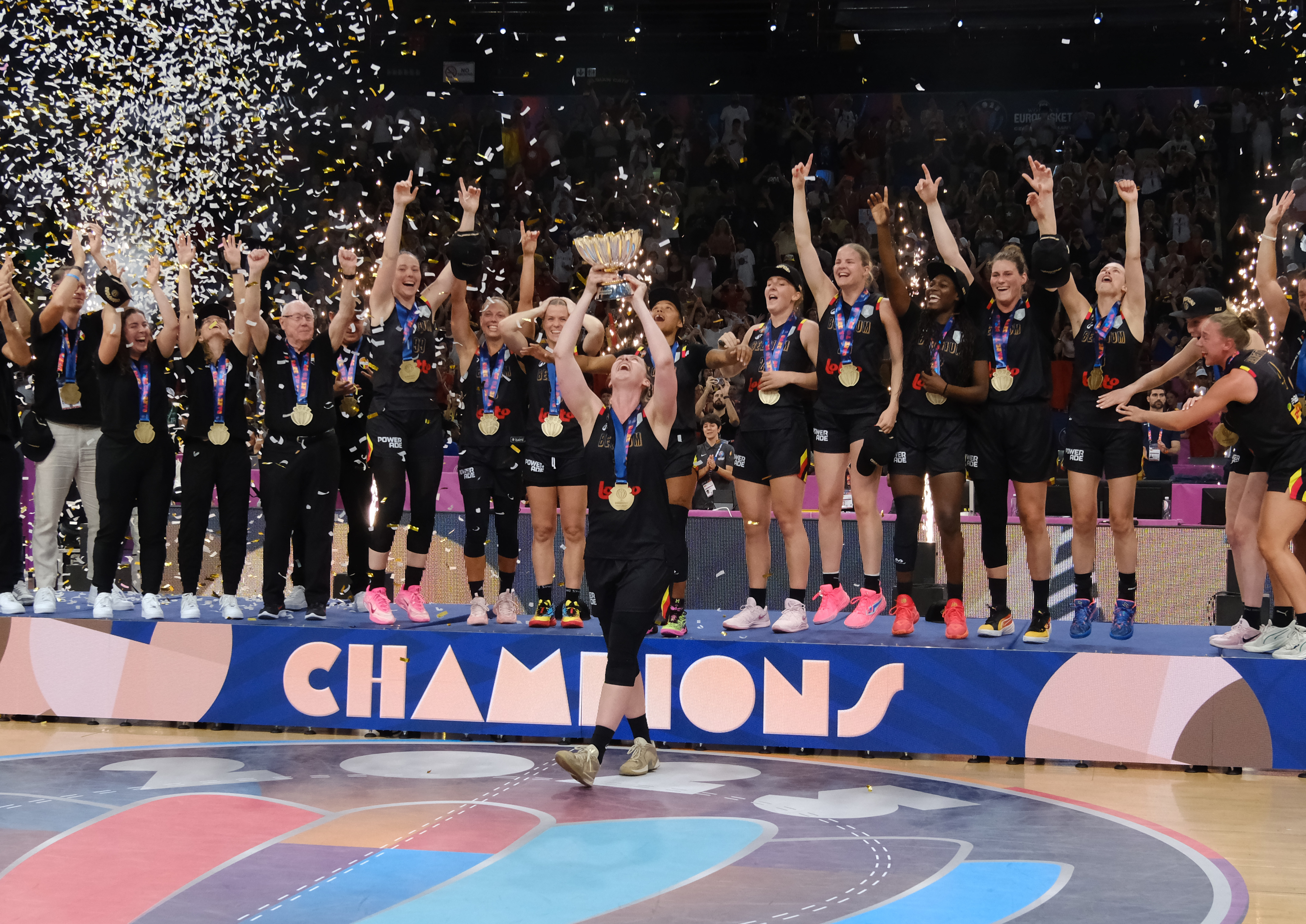

Team roster: Emma Meesseman, Elise Ramette, Antonia Delaere, Kyara Linskens, Bethy Mununga, Becky Massey,
Maxuelle Lisowa-Mbaka, Julie Vanloo, Julie Allemand, Nastja Claessens, Marie Vervaet, Ine Joris
Head coach: Mike Thibault

=== Player awards ===
The awards were announced on 29 June 2025.

All-Tournament Team
(Belgium) Julie Allemand (Spain) Raquel Carrera	(Belgium) Emma Meesseman (Spain) Alba Torrens	(Italy) Cecilia Zandalasini
MVP: (Belgium) Emma Meesseman

All-Second Team
(Belgium) Julie Vanloo (Turkey) Sevgi Uzun	(France) Valériane Ayayi	(Belgium) Kyara Linskens (Germany) Luisa Geiselsöder
Best defensive player: (Spain) Mariona Ortiz
Rising star: (Lithuania) Justė Jocytė
Best coach: (Italy) Andrea Capobianco

== Statistics and awards ==
=== Statistical leaders ===
==== Players ====
Points

Name	PPG
(Slovenia) Jessica Shepard	22.7
(Sweden) Klara Lundquist	19.3
(Belgium) Emma Meesseman	19.2
(Turkey) Teaira McCowan	16.8
(Italy) Cecilia Zandalasini	16.8

Rebounds

Name	RPG
(Slovenia) Jessica Shepard	11.3
(Turkey) Teaira McCowan	9.8
(Sweden) Klara Lundquist	9.7
(Belgium) Emma Meesseman	9.2
(Lithuania) Laura Juškaitė	8.7

Assists

Name	APG
(Sweden) Klara Lundquist	7.3
(United Kingdom) Holly Winterburn	6.7
(Slovenia) Eva Lisec	6.3
(France) Romane Bernies	5.8
(Slovenia) Teja Oblak	5.7
(Greece) Pinelopi Pavlopoulou	5.7

Blocks

Name	BPG
(Lithuania) Giedrė Labuckienė	1.8
(Belgium) Emma Meesseman	1.8
(Slovenia) Eva Lisec	1.7
(Switzerland) Lin Schwarz	1.3
(United Kingdom) Temi Fagbenle	1.3
(Montenegro) Maja Bigović	1.3
(Sweden) Fanny Wadling	1.3
(Germany) Luisa Geiselsöder	1.3

Steals

Name	SPG
(Portugal) Márcia da Costa	3.7
(United Kingdom) Temi Fagbenle	2.7
(Greece) Eleanna Christinaki	2.3
(Serbia) Jovana Nogić	2.3
(Belgium) Emma Meesseman	2.3

Efficiency

Name	EFFPG
(Slovenia) Jessica Shepard	30.3
(Belgium) Emma Meesseman	27.7
(Sweden) Klara Lundquist	22.7
(Turkey) Teaira McCowan	21.0
(Italy) Cecilia Zandalasini	19.2

==== Teams ====
Points

Team	PPG
Turkey	81.5
France	79.2
Germany	77.0
Spain	76.7
Belgium	76.0

Rebounds

Team	RPG
Belgium	41.7
Czech Republic	40.2
Turkey	40.0
Lithuania	40.0
Portugal	37.7

Assists

Team	APG
Belgium	22.3
Slovenia	22.3
France	21.8
Germany	21.5
Czech Republic	21.5

Blocks

Team	BPG
Spain	4.7
Lithuania	3.5
Germany	3.3
Italy	2.8
Belgium	2.8
Czech Republic	2.8

Steals

Team	SPG
Greece	10.0
Serbia	10.0
Italy	9.7
Portugal	9.7
France	9.2

Efficiency

Team	EFFPG
Belgium	95.3
France	92.5
Turkey	92.3
Spain	91.7
Germany	88.8

== Marketing ==
The official logo was revealed on 8 March 2024 to mark International Women's Day.
