= 2024 FIBA Women's European Championship for Small Countries =

Tournament details
- Host country: Kosovo
- City: Pristina
- Dates: 25–30 June 2024
- Teams: 8 (from 1 confederation)
- Venue: 1 (in 1 host city)

Final positions
- Champions: Norway (1st title)
- Runners-up: Malta
- Third place: Albania
- Fourth place: Cyprus

Tournament statistics
- Games played: 20
- Attendance: 1,865 (93 per game)
- MVP: (Malta) Amber Melgoza
- Top scorer: (Malta) Amber Melgoza (19.6 ppg)

Official website
- www.fiba.basketball

The 2024 FIBA Women's European Championship for Small Countries was the 18th edition of this competition. The tournament was played in Pristina, Kosovo, from 25 to 30 June 2024.

== Participating teams ==
Country	Last	Best placement in tournament	WR (Note: As of February 2024)
Albania	2008	Champions (2002)	92
Andorra	2022	Third place (2000)	111
Armenia	2010	Runners-up (2010)	NR
Cyprus	2022	Champions (2022)	76
Georgia	Debut		NR
Kosovo	2022	Third place (2021)	86
Malta	2022	Champions (2008, 2010, 2016)	80
Norway	2022	Runners-up (2022)	75

== First round ==
The draw of the first round was held on 6 February 2024 in Freising, Germany.

In the first round, the teams were drawn into two groups of four. The first two teams from each group advance to the semifinals; the third and fourth teams play in the 5th–8th place playoffs.

All times are local (Central European Summer Time – UTC+2).

=== Group A ===
Pos	Team	Pld	W	L	PF	PA	PD	Pts	Qualification
1	Malta	3	3	0	242	204	+38	6	Semifinals
2	Cyprus	3	2	1	227	187	+40	5	Semifinals
3	Kosovo (H)	3	1	2	205	197	+8	4	5th–8th place playoffs
4	Georgia	3	0	3	183	269	−86	3	5th–8th place playoffs

Source: FIBA
(H) Hosts

25 June 2024
13:00

Boxscore

Cyprus	89–57	Georgia
Scoring by quarter: 15–16, 19–23, 35–8, 20–10
Pts: Pangalos 21; Rebs: Chenaklieva 9 Asts: Pangalos 6		Pts: Papuashvili 19; Rebs: Tsivtsivadze 10; Asts: Tsivtsivadze 9

Palace of Youth and Sports
Attendance: 50
Referees: Nikola Bejat (NOR), Edison Gjoni (ALB), Andrej Zlatevski (MKD)

25 June 2024
20:30

Boxscore

Malta	72–65	Kosovo
Scoring by quarter: 19–18, 19–12, 12–20, 22–15
Pts: Melgoza 21; Rebs: De Martino 9 Asts: Bonett 5		Pts: Perquku 16; Rebs: Muhadri 12; Asts: Perquku, Tuhina 4

Palace of Youth and Sports
Attendance: 200
Referees: Cisil Güngör (TUR), Suzana Vujičić (MNE), Tamara Harutyunyan (ARM)

26 June 2024
15:30

Boxscore

Georgia	68–88	Malta
Scoring by quarter: 23–14, 15–30, 21–25, 9–19
Pts: Barbakadze 17; Rebs: three players 7 Asts: Tsivtsivadze 5		Pts: De Martino 30; Rebs: Melgoza 10; Asts: De Martino 7

Palace of Youth and Sports
Attendance: 30
Referees: Cisil Güngör (TUR), Andrej Zlatevski (MKD), Edison Gjoni (ALB)

26 June 2024
20:30

Boxscore

Kosovo	48–67	Cyprus
Scoring by quarter: 13–11, 13–26, 12–22, 10–8
Pts: Muhadri 17; Rebs: Muhadri 13; Asts: Perquku 7		Pts: Chenaklieva 13; Rebs: Chenaklieva 11; Asts: Kyprianou 5

Palace of Youth and Sports
Attendance: 250
Referees: Nikola Bejat (NOR), Suzana Vujičić (MNE), Tamara Harutyunyan (ARM)

27 June 2024
18:00

Boxscore

Cyprus	71–82 (OT)	Malta
Scoring by quarter: 16–20, 13–14, 18–16, 22–19, Overtime: 2–13
Pts: Pangalos 20; Rebs: Themistokleous 14; Asts: Pangalos 4		Pts: Melgoza 27; Rebs: Galea 14; Asts: De Martino 6

Palace of Youth and Sports
Attendance: 50
Referees: Suzana Vujičić (MNE), Edison Gjoni (ALB), Tamara Harutyunyan (ARM)

27 June 2024
20:30

Boxscore

Kosovo	92–58	Georgia
Scoring by quarter: 22–14, 13–16, 36–12, 21–16
Pts: Perquku 27; Rebs: Muhadri 14; Asts: Muhadri 7		Pts: Kavtaradze 13; Rebs: Barbakadze 12; Asts: Papuashvili 4

Palace of Youth and Sports
Attendance: 300
Referees: Cisil Güngör (TUR), Nikola Bejat (NOR), Andrej Zlatevski (MKD)

=== Group B ===
Pos	Team	Pld	W	L	PF	PA	PD	Pts	Qualification
1	Norway	3	3	0	234	152	+82	6	Semifinals
2	Albania	3	2	1	187	211	−24	5	Semifinals
3	Armenia	3	1	2	179	186	−7	4	5th–8th place playoffs
4	Andorra	3	0	3	140	191	−51	3	5th–8th place playoffs

Source: FIBA

25 June 2024
15:30

Boxscore

Norway	73–70	Armenia
Scoring by quarter: 13–18, 24–21, 20–22, 16–9
Pts: Halvorsen 16; Rebs: Halvorsen 7 Asts: Halvorsen 6		Pts: Manucharyan 23; Rebs: Kepenekian 10; Asts: Kepenekian 3

Palace of Youth and Sports
Attendance: 50
Referees: Tolga Edis (TUR), Elldin Uglari (KOS), Martina Mekelova (SVK)

25 June 2024
18:00

Boxscore

Albania	74–58	Andorra
Scoring by quarter: 14–14, 21–15, 22–9, 17–20
Pts: Qosja 18; Rebs: Lalaj 13; Asts: Gjergji, Pellumbi 4		Pts: Guri 16; Rebs: Guri 13; Asts: Guri 3

Palace of Youth and Sports
Attendance: 50
Referees: Xhelal Mumini (KOS), Marina Shalamberidze (GEO), Maria Ignatiou (CYP)

26 June 2024
13:00

Boxscore

Andorra	39–72	Norway
Scoring by quarter: 9–22, 9–13, 8–18, 13–19
Pts: Guri 18; Rebs: Collado, Guri 11; Asts: Brunet 3		Pts: Mildestvedt 13; Rebs: Mildestvedt 10; Asts: Havnes 5

Palace of Youth and Sports
Attendance: 20
Referees: Martina Mekelova (SVK), Xhelal Mumini (KOS), Maria Ignatiou (CYP)

26 June 2024
18:00

Boxscore

Armenia	64–70	Albania
Scoring by quarter: 16–14, 16–12, 17–17, 15–27
Pts: Vartazarian 25; Rebs: Vartazarian 19; Asts: Manucharyan 5		Pts: Qosja 15; Rebs: Lalaj 10; Asts: Lalaj 6

Palace of Youth and Sports
Attendance: 60
Referees: Tolga Edis (TUR), Elldin Uglari (KOS), Marina Shalamberidze (GEO)

27 June 2024
13:00

Boxscore

Norway	89–43	Albania
Scoring by quarter: 12–11, 25–7, 28–15, 24–10
Pts: Jacobsen 13; Rebs: Holm 7 Asts: Sanford 5		Pts: Lalaj 10; Rebs: Lalaj 8 Asts: Qosja 6

Palace of Youth and Sports
Attendance: 50
Referees: Tolga Edis (TUR), Elldin Uglari (KOS), Marina Shalamberidze (GEO)

27 June 2024
15:30

Boxscore

Andorra	43–45	Armenia
Scoring by quarter: 9–7, 13–5, 7–15, 14–18
Pts: Guri 12; Rebs: Guri 23; Asts: Sobany, Guri 4		Pts: Keshmeshian 13; Rebs: Kepenekian 14; Asts: Keshmeshian, Vartazarian 2

Palace of Youth and Sports
Attendance: 45
Referees: Xhelal Mumini (KOS), Martina Mekelova (SVK), Maria Ignatiou (CYP)

== 5th–8th place playoffs ==
=== Bracket ===
5th–8th place semifinals
29 June
Kosovo	81
Andorra	67
29 June
Armenia	81
Georgia	58

5th place game
30 June
Kosovo	53
Armenia	39
7th place game
30 June
Andorra	80
Georgia	49

=== 5th–8th place semifinals ===
29 June 2024
13:00

Boxscore

Kosovo	81–67	Andorra
Scoring by quarter: 19–16, 21–18, 23–14, 18–19
Pts: Rrahmani, Perquku 18; Rebs: Muhadri 15; Asts: Tuhina 9		Pts: Collado 19; Rebs: Guri 13; Asts: Guri 5

Palace of Youth and Sports
Attendance: 150
Referees: Nikola Bejat (NOR), Edison Gjoni (ALB), Tamara Harutyunyan (ARM)

29 June 2024
15:30

Boxscore

Armenia	81–58	Georgia
Scoring by quarter: 20–12, 22–16, 15–17, 24–13
Pts: Keshmeshian 13; Rebs: Vartazarian, Kepenekian 8 Asts: Manucharyan 5		Pts: Papuashvili 18; Rebs: Keburia 13; Asts: Tsivtsivadze 7

Palace of Youth and Sports
Attendance: 50
Referees: Xhelal Mumini (KOS), Martina Mekelova (SVK), Maria Ignatiou (CYP)

=== 7th place game ===
30 June 2024
13:00

Boxscore

Andorra	80–49	Georgia
Scoring by quarter: 28–9, 15–15, 20–16, 17–9
Pts: Guri 17; Rebs: Guri 19; Asts: Brunet 5		Pts: Keburia 14; Rebs: Four players 8 Asts: Tsivtsivadze 5

Palace of Youth and Sports
Attendance: 20
Referees: Martina Mekelova (SVK), Elldin Uglari (KOS), Tamara Harutyunyan (ARM)

=== 5th place game ===
30 June 2024
15:30

Boxscore

Kosovo	53–39	Armenia
Scoring by quarter: 21–4, 13–18, 12–15, 7–2
Pts: Kamerolli 19; Rebs: Muhadri 21; Asts: Perquku, Tuhina 4		Pts: Keshmeshian 12; Rebs: Vartazarian 11; Asts: Markaryan, Keshmeshian 3

Palace of Youth and Sports
Attendance: 100
Referees: Edison Gjoni (ALB), Maria Ignatiou (CYP), Marina Shalamberidze (GEO)

== Championship playoffs ==
=== Bracket ===
Semifinals
29 June
Malta	75
Albania	62
29 June
Norway	72
Cyprus	31

Final
30 June
Malta	54
Norway	61
3rd place game
30 June
Albania	73
Cyprus	61

=== Semifinals ===
29 June 2024
18:00

Boxscore

Malta	75–62	Albania
Scoring by quarter: 28–13, 13–15, 25–17, 9–17
Pts: Melgoza 17; Rebs: Melgoza 12; Asts: De Martino 6		Pts: Qosja 12; Rebs: Lalaj 8 Asts: Qosja 4

Palace of Youth and Sports
Attendance: 100
Referees: Cisil Güngör (TUR), Elldin Uglari (KOS), Marina Shalamberidze (GEO)

29 June 2024
20:30

Boxscore

Norway	72–31	Cyprus
Scoring by quarter: 18–5, 23–6, 10–16, 21–4
Pts: Sanford 13; Rebs: Halvorsen 7 Asts: Sanford 4		Pts: Pangalos 10; Rebs: Chenaklieva 8 Asts: Pangalos 3

Palace of Youth and Sports
Attendance: 30
Referees: Tolga Edis (TUR), Suzana Vujičić (MNE), Andrej Zlatevski (MKD)

=== 3rd place game ===
30 June 2024
18:00

Boxscore

Albania	73–61	Cyprus
Scoring by quarter: 10–14, 20–18, 19–15, 24–14
Pts: Qosja, Muca 12; Rebs: Lalaj 11; Asts: Semanjaku 4		Pts: Pangalos 27; Rebs: Georgiou 7 Asts: Pangalos 5

Palace of Youth and Sports
Attendance: 60
Referees: Nikola Bejat (NOR), Suzana Vujičić (MNE), Andrej Zlatevski (MKD)

=== Final ===
30 June 2024
20:30

Boxscore

Malta	54–61	Norway
Scoring by quarter: 19–17, 10–7, 10–22, 15–15
Pts: Melgoza 16; Rebs: Melgoza 12; Asts: Melgoza 4		Pts: A. Sorbye 14; Rebs: Halvorsen 8 Asts: A. Sorbye 5

Palace of Youth and Sports
Attendance: 200
Referees: Tolga Edis (TUR), Cisil Güngör (TUR), Xhelal Mumini (KOS)

== Final standings ==
Rank	Team	Record
1st place, gold medalist(s)	Norway	5–0
2nd place, silver medalist(s)	Malta	4–1
3rd place, bronze medalist(s)	Albania	3–2
4th	Cyprus	2–3
5th	Kosovo	3–2
6th	Armenia	2–3
7th	Andorra	1–4
8th	Georgia	0–5

2024 FIBA Women's European Championship for Small Countries Champions

Norway
1st title

Team roster: Karoline Teigland, Aurora Sorbye, Sunniva Sorbye, Severine Uggen, Andrea Raa, Tori Halvorsen, Vilde Havne, Synne Jacobsen, Karyn Sanford, Maren Mildestvedt, Eirin Holm, Siri Granheim
Head coach: Gunnar Voigt Nesboe

== Statistics and awards ==
=== Statistical leaders ===
==== Players ====
Points

Name	PPG
(Malta) Amber Melgoza	19.6
(Cyprus) Marissa Pangalos	17.2
(Kosovo) Enisa Kamerolli	17.0
(Malta) Stephanie De Martino	16.2
(Andorra) Claudia Guri	15.2

Rebounds

Name	RPG
(Andorra) Claudia Guri	15.8
(Kosovo) Aulona Muhadri	15.0
(Malta) Amber Melgoza	10.8
(Armenia) Sylvia Vartazarian	10.4
(Albania) Ornela Lalaj	10.0

Assists

Name	APG
(Georgia (country)) Ekaterine Tsivtsivadze	5.8
(Kosovo) Astera Tuhina	4.8
(Malta) Stephanie De Martino	4.6
(Kosovo) Arbnore Perquku	4.6
(Cyprus) Marissa Pangalos	4.4

Blocks

Name	BPG
(Andorra) Claudia Guri	3.4
(Malta) Danika Galea	1.6
(Malta) Josephine Grima	1.2
(Cyprus) Stilyana Chenaklieva	1.0
(Albania) Enisa Semanjaku	0.8

Steals

Name	SPG
(Malta) Amber Melgoza	3.2
(Cyprus) Stilyana Chenaklieva	3.0
(Kosovo) Enisa Kamerolli	2.6
(Kosovo) Aulona Muhadri	2.4
(Andorra) Laura Laurent	2.2
(Albania) Enisa Qosja	2.2

Efficiency

Name	EFFPG
(Kosovo) Aulona Muhadri	25.4
(Malta) Amber Melgoza	22.2
(Andorra) Claudia Guri	18.6
(Albania) Ornela Lalaj	18.2
(Malta) Danika Galea	17.6

==== Teams ====
Points

Team	PPG
Malta	74.2
Norway	73.4
Kosovo	67.8
Albania	64.4
Cyprus	63.8

Rebounds

Team	RPG
Armenia	52.4
Norway	52.4
Andorra	50.0
Georgia	47.2
Malta	47.0

Assists

Team	APG
Norway	18.6
Malta	16.4
Kosovo	16.2
Cyprus	14.8
Albania	14.6

Blocks

Team	BPG
Andorra	5.0
Malta	3.8
Albania	2.8
Norway	2.8
Cyprus	2.0

Steals

Team	SPG
Kosovo	12.4
Norway	12.0
Cyprus	11.0
Albania	10.8
Malta	10.2

Efficiency

Team	EFFPG
Malta	94.3
Norway	93.3
Kosovo	71.6
Cyprus	62.0
Albania	60.8

=== Awards ===
The All-Tournament team and MVP award was announced on 30 June 2024.

All-Tournament Team
Guard	Forwards	Centers
(Norway) Aurora Sorbye (Cyprus) Marissa Pangalos	(Albania) Ornela Lalaj (Norway) Tori Halvorsen	(Malta) Amber Melgoza
MVP: (Malta) Amber Melgoza
