= 2006 European Promotion Cup for Women =

Women's European Championship for Small Countries

Tournament details
- Host country: Malta
- City: Ta' Qali
- Dates: 18–23 July 2006
- Teams: 7 (from 1 confederation)
- Venue: 1 (in 1 host city)

Final positions
- Champions: Luxembourg (1st title)
- Runners-up: Scotland
- Third place: Moldova

The 2006 European Promotion Cup for Women was the ninth edition of the basketball European Promotion Cup for Women, today known as FIBA Women's European Championship for Small Countries. The tournament took place in Ta' Qali, Malta, from 18 to 23 July 2006. Luxembourg women's national basketball team won the tournament for the first time.

== Participating teams ==
- Andorra
- Gibraltar
- Luxembourg
- Malta
- Moldova
- Scotland
- Wales

== First round ==
In the first round, the teams were drawn into two groups. The first two teams from each group advance to the semifinals, the other teams will play in the 5th–7th place classification.

=== Group A ===
Pos	Team	Pld	W	L	PF	PA	PD	Pts	Qualification
1	Luxembourg	2	2	0	167	78	+89	4	Semifinals
2	Moldova	2	1	1	149	90	+59	3	Semifinals
3	Gibraltar	2	0	2	67	215	−148	2	5th–7th place classification

Source: FIBA Archive

18 July 2006

Boxscore

Luxembourg	56–45	Moldova

19 July 2006

Boxscore

Moldova	104–34	Gibraltar

20 July 2006

Boxscore

Gibraltar	33–111	Luxembourg

=== Group B ===
Pos	Team	Pld	W	L	PF	PA	PD	Pts	Qualification
1	Scotland	3	3	0	243	129	+114	6	Semifinals
2	Malta	3	2	1	217	169	+48	5	Semifinals
3	Andorra	3	1	2	151	197	−46	4	5th–7th place classification
4	Wales	3	0	3	122	238	−116	3	5th–7th place classification

Source: FIBA Archive

18 July 2006

Boxscore

Malta	77–47	Wales

18 July 2006

Boxscore

Scotland	72–39	Andorra

19 July 2006

Boxscore

Andorra	51–76	Malta

19 July 2006

Boxscore

Wales	26–100	Scotland

20 July 2006

Boxscore

Malta	64–71	Scotland

20 July 2006

Boxscore

Andorra	61–49	Wales

== 5th–7th place classification ==
=== Group C ===
Pos	Team	Pld	W	L	PF	PA	PD	Pts
5	Andorra	2	2	0	157	87	+70	4
6	Wales	2	1	1	103	111	−8	3
7	Gibraltar	2	0	2	88	150	−62	2

Source: FIBA

22 July 2006

Boxscore

Gibraltar	50–54	Wales

23 July 2006

Boxscore

Gibraltar	38–96	Andorra

== Playoffs ==
Semifinals
A1	Luxembourg	65
B2	Malta	60
A2	Moldova	48
B1	Scotland	68

Finals
A1	Luxembourg	54
B1	Scotland	49
3rd place match
B2	Malta	75
A2	Moldova	81

=== Semifinals ===
22 July 2006

Boxscore

Luxembourg	65–60	Malta

22 July 2006

Boxscore

Moldova	48–68	Scotland

=== 3rd place match ===
23 July 2006

Boxscore

Malta	75–81	Moldova

=== Final ===
23 July 2006

Boxscore

Luxembourg	54–49	Scotland

== Final standings ==
Rank	Team
1st place, gold medalist(s)	Luxembourg
2nd place, silver medalist(s)	Scotland
3rd place, bronze medalist(s)	Moldova
4	Malta
5	Andorra
6	Wales
7	Gibraltar
