= Ine Joris =

Belgian basketball player

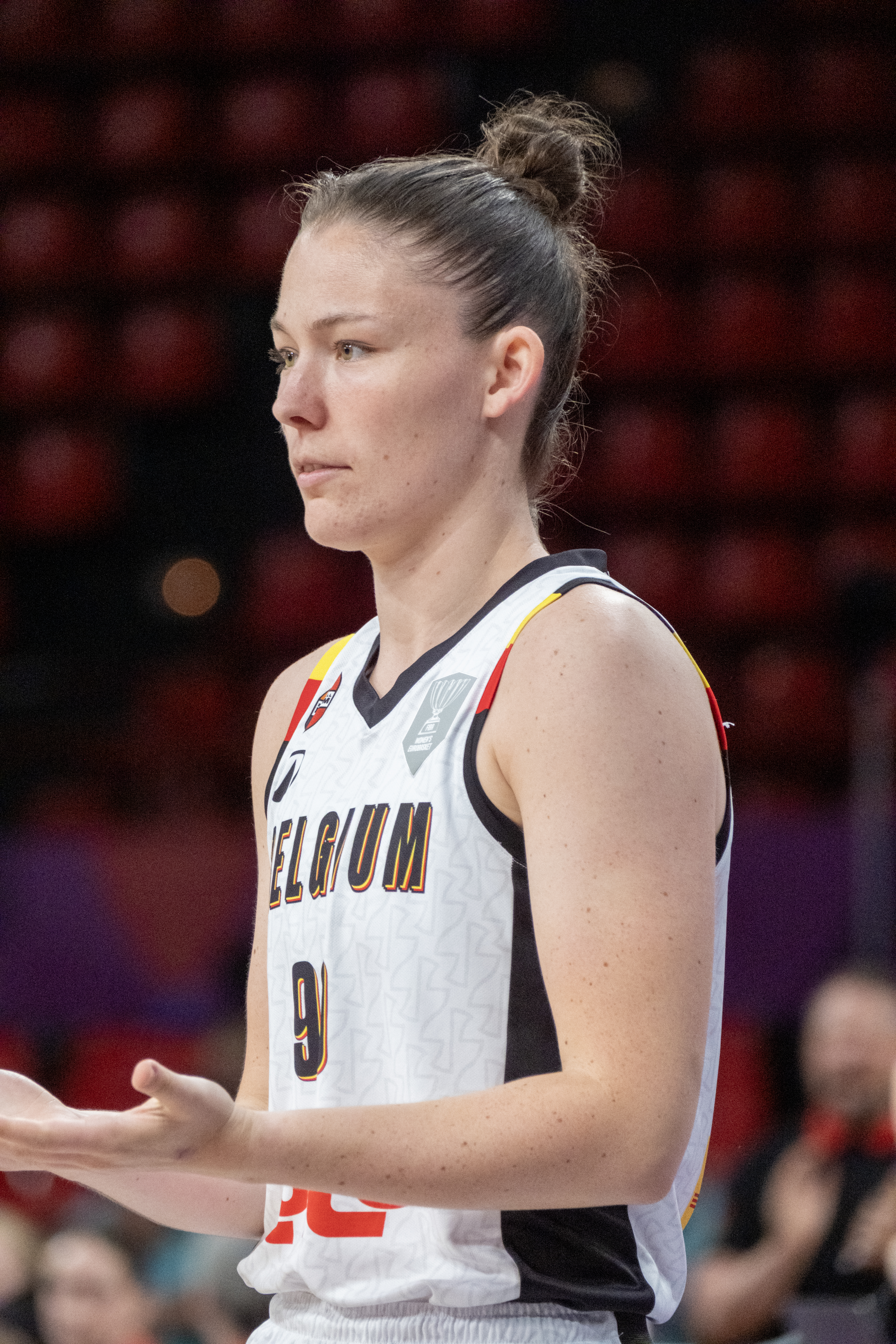
- Joris with Belgium during 2025 EuroBasket

Personal information
- Born: 25 July 2001 (age 25)
- Listed height: 1.83 m (6 ft 0 in)

Career history
- 2019–22: Phantoms Basket Boom
- 2022–23: Kortrijk Spurs
- 2023–24: Castors Braine
- 2024–: Fundación Ardoi
- 2025-26: BAXI Ferrol

Career highlights
- FIBA EuroBasket champion (2025)

Ine Joris (born 25 July 2001) is a Belgian basketball player. She represented Belgium at the 2024 Summer Olympics. With Belgium, she became European champion in 2025.

Joris was also part of the Belgium women's national 3x3 team during the 2022 FIBA 3x3 World Cup in Antwerp.

== Honours ==
=== National team ===
- EuroBasket Women: (gold) 2025
- Belgian Sports team of the Year: 2023, 2025

=== Individual ===
- Belgian Promise of the Year: 2022
