= 2012 FIBA Women's European Championship for Small Countries =

Tournament details
- Host country: Republic of Macedonia
- City: Ohrid
- Dates: 10–15 July 2012
- Teams: 8 (from 1 confederation)
- Venue: 1 (in 1 host city)

Final positions
- Champions: Austria (4th title)
- Runners-up: Macedonia
- Third place: Malta

Official website
- www.fibaeurope.com

The 2012 FIBA Women's European Championship for Small Countries was the 12th edition of this competition. The tournament took place in Ohrid, Macedonia, from 10 to 15 July 2012. Austria women's national basketball team won the tournament for the fourth time.

== Venue ==
Biljanini Izvori Sports Hall
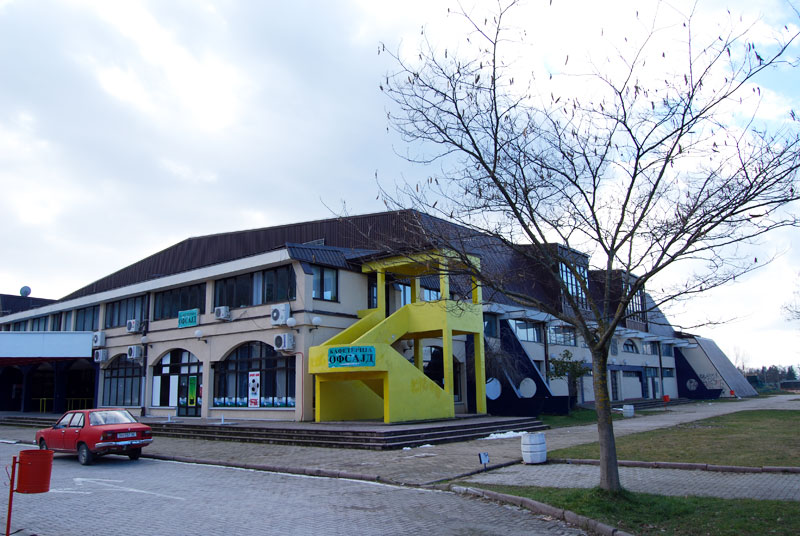

== Participating teams ==
- Austria
- Azerbaijan
- Gibraltar
- Malta
- Macedonia
- Moldova
- Scotland
- Wales

== First round ==
In the first round, the teams were drawn into two groups of four. The first two teams from each group advance to the semifinals, the other teams will play in the 5th–8th place playoffs.

=== Group A ===
Pos	Team	Pld	W	L	PF	PA	PD	Pts	Qualification
1	Malta	3	3	0	232	150	+82	6	Semifinals
2	Scotland	3	2	1	211	153	+58	5	Semifinals
3	Azerbaijan	3	1	2	187	197	−10	4	5th–8th place playoffs
4	Moldova	3	0	3	86	216	−130	3	5th–8th place playoffs

Source: FIBA Archive

10 July 2012

Boxscore

Scotland	73–54	Azerbaijan

10 July 2012

Boxscore

Moldova	23–72	Malta

11 July 2012

Boxscore

Malta	80–57	Scotland

11 July 2012

Boxscore

Azerbaijan	63–44	Moldova

12 July 2012

Boxscore

Scotland	81–19	Moldova

12 July 2012

Boxscore

Malta	80–70	Azerbaijan

=== Group B ===
Pos	Team	Pld	W	L	PF	PA	PD	Pts	Qualification
1	Macedonia	3	3	0	230	123	+107	6	Semifinals
2	Austria	3	2	1	191	100	+91	5	Semifinals
3	Wales	3	1	2	134	226	−92	4	5th–8th place playoffs
4	Gibraltar	3	0	3	113	219	−106	3	5th–8th place playoffs

Source: FIBA Archive

10 July 2012

Boxscore

Austria	72–30	Wales

10 July 2012

Boxscore

Gibraltar	36–83	Macedonia

11 July 2012

Boxscore

Macedonia	41–39	Austria

11 July 2012

Boxscore

Wales	56–48	Gibraltar

12 July 2012

Boxscore

Austria	80–29	Gibraltar

12 July 2012

Boxscore

Macedonia	106–48	Wales

== 5th–8th place playoffs ==
5th–8th place semifinals
A3	Azerbaijan	76
B4	Gibraltar	77
B3	Wales	47
A4	Moldova	39

5th place match
B4	Gibraltar	65
B3	Wales	61
7th place match
A3	Azerbaijan	68
A4	Moldova	45

=== 5th–8th place semifinals ===
14 July 2012

Boxscore

Azerbaijan	76–77	Gibraltar

14 July 2012

Boxscore

Wales	47–39	Moldova

=== 7th place match ===
15 July 2012

Boxscore

Azerbaijan	68–45	Moldova

=== 5th place match ===
15 July 2012

Boxscore

Gibraltar	65–61	Wales

== Championship playoffs ==
Semifinals
A1	Malta	53
B2	Austria	61
B1	Macedonia	80
A2	Scotland	61

Final
B2	Austria	68
B1	Macedonia	63
3rd place match
A1	Malta	72
A2	Scotland	52

=== Semifinals ===
14 July 2012

Boxscore

Malta	53–61	Austria

14 July 2012

Boxscore

Macedonia	80–61	Scotland

=== 3rd place match ===
15 July 2012

Boxscore

Malta	72–52	Scotland

=== Final ===
15 July 2012

Boxscore

Austria	68–63	Macedonia

== Final standings ==
Rank	Team
1st place, gold medalist(s)	Austria
2nd place, silver medalist(s)	Macedonia
3rd place, bronze medalist(s)	Malta
4	Scotland
5	Gibraltar
6	Wales
7	Azerbaijan
8	Moldova
