= Jovana Popović =

Serbian basketball player (born 2007)

No. 13 – UConn Huskies
- Position: Guard
- League: Big East Conference

Personal information
- Born: 5 October 2007 (age 19)
- Listed height: 5 ft 9 in (1.75 m)

Career information
- High school: Gimnazija Žarko Zrenjanin
- College: UConn (2026–present)
- Playing career: 2023–present

Career history
- 2023–2025: ŽKK Art Basket

Career highlights
- Nike Hoop Summit (2025)

Jovana Popović (Serbian Cyrillic: Јована Поповић; born 5 October 2007) is a Serbian college basketball player for the UConn Huskies of the Big East Conference. She previously played for ŽKK Art Basket of the First Women's Basketball League of Serbia.

== Playing career ==
Popović began her career for ŽKK Art Basket of the First Women's Basketball League of Serbia. During the 2023–24 season, she led Art Basket to its first Serbian championship. During the 2024–25 season she was named the First League's MVP and Best Shooter. During the 2025–26 season she averaged averaged 27.1 points, 4.7 assists and 4.7 steals per game.

She competed at the 2024 Basketball Without Borders and was named camp MVP. She also competed at the 2025 Nike Hoop Summit for Team World and recorded 11 points, one assist, and an offensive rebound in 18 minutes off the bench. She was the team's third leading scorer and outscored all of the starters.

On November 20, 2025, she signed her National Letter of Intent to play college basketball at UConn. On October 12, 2026, during the Hall of Fame Series Exhibition game against Syracuse, she recorded ten points. On 19 October 2026, during an exhibition game against Texas, she recorded 22 points, with a game-high seven rebounds and five assists.

== National team career ==
Popovic made her national team debut for the Serbia under-16 national team at the 2021 FIBA U16 Women's European Challengers. She then competed at the 2022 FIBA U16 Women's European Championship Division B and helped Serbia win the Division B championship over Turkey. With the win, Serbia was promoted to Division A for the 2023 FIBA U16 Women's European Championship. During the 2023 U16 Women's European Championship, she averaged 15.4 points, 4.7 rebounds and 6.6 assists per game.

She represented the Serbia under-18 national team at the 2024 FIBA U18 Women's EuroBasket where she averaged 16.3 points, 4.6 rebounds and 4.3 assists per game. During the bronze medal game she recorded 28 points, seven rebounds, six assists and two steals. She was subsequently named to the All-Tournament Team.

She again represented Serbia at the 2025 FIBA U18 Women's EuroBasket where she averaged 15.2 points, 7.0 rebounds and 5.0 assists per game. On 13 July 2025, during the seventh place game against Montenegro, she recorded 20 points, 14 rebounds and 12 assists for a triple-double. This was the second triple-double ever recorded during the main event of the FIBA U18 Women's EuroBasket and just the fifth overall, including performances from the discontinued Qualifying and Challenge Rounds. She became the first player to accomplish this feat since Aleksandra Crvendakić in 2013.

On 17 June 2025, she was named to the Serbia national team for the EuroBasket Women 2025. She made her senior national team debut and was the youngest player at the tournament.
