= 2000 European Promotion Cup for Women =

FIBA women's basketball tournament

Tournament details
- Host country: Republic of Macedonia
- City: Ohrid
- Dates: 14–18 June 2000
- Teams: 5 (from 1 confederation)
- Venue: 1 (in 1 host city)

Final positions
- Champions: Macedonia (1st title)
- Runners-up: Scotland
- Third place: Andorra

The 2000 European Promotion Cup for Women was the sixth edition of the basketball European Promotion Cup for Women, today known as FIBA Women's European Championship for Small Countries. The tournament took place in Ohrid, Republic of Macedonia, from 14 to 18 June 2000. Macedonia women's national basketball team won the tournament for the first time.

== Venue ==
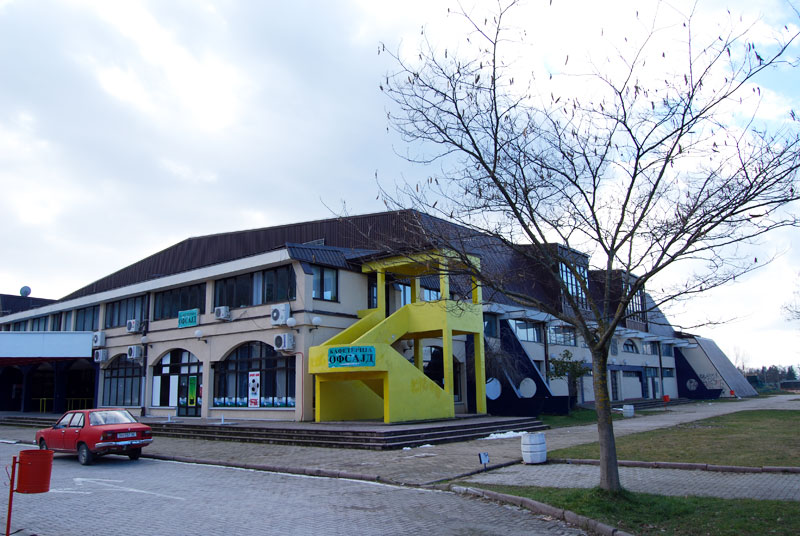
Biljanini Izvori Sports Hall

== Participating teams ==
- Andorra
- Gibraltar
- Malta
- Macedonia
- Scotland

== Final standings ==
Pos	Team	Pld	W	L	PF	PA	PD	Pts
1	Macedonia	4	4	0	382	115	+267	8
2	Scotland	4	3	1	308	187	+121	7
3	Andorra	4	2	2	212	266	−54	6
4	Malta	4	1	3	195	292	−97	5
5	Gibraltar	4	0	4	141	378	−237	4

Source: FIBA Archive

== Results ==
14 June 2000

Boxscore

Scotland	70–43	Andorra

14 June 2000

Boxscore

Gibraltar	19–129	Macedonia

15 June 2000

Boxscore

Andorra	70–35	Gibraltar

15 June 2000

Boxscore

Malta	20–83	Macedonia

16 June 2000

Boxscore

Gibraltar	35–104	Scotland

16 June 2000

Boxscore

Andorra	64–59	Malta

17 June 2000

Boxscore

Scotland	93–41	Malta

17 June 2000

Boxscore

Macedonia	102–35	Andorra

18 June 2000

Boxscore

Malta	75–52	Gibraltar

18 June 2000

Boxscore

Scotland	41–68	Macedonia
