= EuroBasket Women 1956 =

Basketball tournament

EuroBasket 1956 Women
5th FIBA European Women's Basketball Championship

Tournament details
- Host country: Czechoslovakia
- City: Prague
- Dates: June 2–10
- Teams: 16
- Venue(s): 1 (in 1 host city)

Final positions
- Champions: Soviet Union (4th title)

Official website
- Official website (archive)

The 1956 European Women's Basketball Championship was the 5th regional championship held by FIBA Europe for women. The competition was held in Prague, Czechoslovakia and took place June 2–10, 1956. The Soviet Union won their fourth consecutive gold medal, with Czechoslovakia and Bulgaria repeating their performance of the previous tournament, winning silver and bronze respectively.

== Preliminary round ==
The teams were divided into four groups. The first two from each group would go to the Semi-Final Round. The remaining teams went to the Classification Round to determine the 9th–16th spots.

=== Group A ===
Rank	Team	W	L	Pts	Diff
1	Bulgaria	3	0	6	+68
2	Poland	2	1	5	+43
3	Yugoslavia	1	2	4	+13
4	Finland	0	3	3	−124

June 2, 1956
8:30

Yugoslavia (Socialist Federal Republic of Yugoslavia) 66, Finland 25
Scoring by half: 28–16, 38–9
Pts: Zokovic (20)	Pts: Hakola (14)

June 2, 1956
20:30

Poland 61, Bulgaria 62 ()
Scoring by half: 35–43, 19–11 Overtime: 7–8
Pts: Gruszczynska-Olesiewicz (22)	Pts: Vojnova (24)

June 3, 1956
11:30

Bulgaria 90, Finland 36
Scoring by half: 44–14, 46–22
Pts: Pencheva (29)	Pts: Hakola (17)

June 3, 1956
20:30

Yugoslavia (Socialist Federal Republic of Yugoslavia) 63, Poland 78
Scoring by half: 32–40, 31–38
Pts: Zokovic (29)	Pts: Kapalczynska-Roga (28)

June 4, 1956
10:00

Finland 47, Poland 76
Scoring by half: 20–29, 27–47
Pts: Hakola (23)	Pts: Migula-Jakubowska (19)

June 4, 1956
19:00

Bulgaria 71, Yugoslavia 58
Scoring by half: 36–18, 35–40
Pts: Vasileva-Chalaskanova (21)	Pts: Zokovic (16)

=== Group B ===
Rank	Team	W	L	Pts	Diff
1	Czechoslovakia	3	0	6	+231
2	Italy	2	1	5	+84
3	Denmark	1	2	4	−168
4	Scotland	0	3	3	−147

June 2, 1956
10:00

Italy 91, Scotland 32
Scoring by half: 48–16, 43–16
Pts: Ronchetti (17)	Pts: Herman (12)

June 2, 1956
19:00

Czechoslovakia 132, Denmark 9
Scoring by half: 49–6, 83–3
Pts: Hubalkova (27)	Pts: Levison (4)

June 3, 1956
10:00

Denmark 40, Scotland 33
Scoring by half: 11–15, 29–18
Pts: Rode (22)	Pts: Herman (14)

June 3, 1956
19:00

Czechoslovakia 69, Italy 42
Scoring by half: 37–24, 32–18
Pts: Hubalkova (17)	Pts: Donda (12)

June 4, 1956
15:00

Scotland 32, Czechoslovakia 113
Scoring by half: 9–69, 23–44
Pts: Davis (6)	Pts: Tomaskova-Staudova (29)

June 4, 1956
22:00

Italy 80, Denmark 28
Scoring by half: 36–14, 44–14
Pts: Tarabocchia (27)	Pts: Moller (11)

=== Group C ===
Rank	Team	W	L	Pts	Diff
1	Soviet Union	3	0	6	+280
2	Austria	2	1	5	−30
3	Netherlands	1	2	4	−29
4	Switzerland	0	3	3	−221

June 2, 1956
11:30

Soviet Union 153, Switzerland 25
Scoring by half: 74–11, 79–14
Pts: Alekseeva (27)	Pts: Vicent (9)

June 2, 1956
22:00

Austria 54, Netherlands 33
Scoring by half: 29–15, 25–18
Pts: Hantschel (17)	Pts: Koper-van Es (12)

June 3, 1956
16:30

Switzerland 18, Netherlands 71
Scoring by half: 11–45, 7–26
Pts: Schroder (5)	Pts: Koper-van Es (14)

June 3, 1956
22:00

Soviet Union 121, Austria 30
Scoring by half: 58–16, 63–14
Pts: Alekseeva (21)	Pts: Foltinek (10)

June 4, 1956
13:30

Austria 69, Switzerland 29
Scoring by half: 32–14, 37–15
Pts: Foltinek (20)	Pts: Schenk (7)

June 4, 1956
16:30

Netherlands 30, Soviet Union 91
Scoring by half: 14–43, 16–48
Pts: Buys-Bloemsma (14)	Pts: Mamentieva (21)

=== Group D ===
Rank	Team	W	L	Pts	Diff
1	Hungary	3	0	6	+52
2	France	2	1	5	+24
3	Romania	1	2	4	0
4	Germany	0	3	3	−76

June 2, 1956
14:00

Romania 49, Germany 30
Scoring by half: 17–12, 32–18
Pts: Sebestien (10)	Pts: Lindowski (7)

June 2, 1956
15:30

Hungary 51, France 42
Scoring by half: 21–17, 30–25
Pts: Szabo-Partine (12)	Pts: Colchen (14)

June 3, 1956
8:30

Germany 39, Hungary 71
Scoring by half: 17–34, 22–37
Pts: Giesser (8)	Pts: Szabo-Partine (15)

June 3, 1956
15:00

France 55, Romania 47
Scoring by half: 29–21, 26–26
Pts: Kloechner-Tavert (25)	Pts: Sebestien (15)

June 4, 1956
8:30

France 54, Germany 29
Scoring by half: 31–15, 23–14
Pts: Kloechner-Tavert (13)	Pts: Giesser (10)

June 4, 1956
20:30

Hungary 61, Romania 50
Scoring by half: 37–16, 24–34
Pts: Nagy (15)	Pts: Antonescu-Niculescu (13)

== Classification round ==
The top two from each group advanced to the 9th–12th classification bracket. The 13th–16th spots were decided between the remaining teams in a separate bracket.

=== Group 1 ===
Rank	Team	W	L	Pts	Diff
1	Yugoslavia	3	0	6	+127
2	Netherlands	2	1	5	+60
3	Germany	1	2	4	−48
4	Scotland	0	3	3	−139

June 5, 1956
9:30

Germany 53, Scotland 34
Scoring by half: 28–14, 25–20
Pts: Becht (11)	Pts: McQueen (9)

June 5, 1956
11:30

Yugoslavia (Socialist Federal Republic of Yugoslavia) 56, Netherlands 51
Scoring by half: 26–28, 30–23
Pts: Zokovic (14)	Pts: van der Velde-Remeyer (13)

June 6, 1956
8:30

Yugoslavia (Socialist Federal Republic of Yugoslavia) 89, Germany 40
Scoring by half: 42–26, 47–14
Pts: Kalusevic (18)	Pts: Giesser (13)

June 6, 1956
22:00

Netherlands 71, Scotland 24
Scoring by half: 26–10, 45–14
Pts: Tit (19)	Pts: Connelly (7)

June 8, 1956
8:30

Scotland 37, Yugoslavia 110
Scoring by half: 14–48, 23–62
Pts: Duncan (6)	Pts: Zokovic (23)

June 8, 1956
22:00

Germany 53, Netherlands 71
Scoring by half: 18–43, 35–28
Pts: Giesser (21)	Pts: Wetter (18)

=== Group 2 ===
Rank	Team	W	L	Pts	Diff
1	Romania	3	0	6	+168
2	Finland	2	1	5	−30
3	Switzerland	1	2	4	−71
4	Denmark	0	3	3	−67

June 5, 1956
10:00

Finland 26, Romania 87
Scoring by half: 15–45, 11–42
Pts: Hakola (15)	Pts: Antonescu-Niculescu (19)

June 5, 1956
22:00

Switzerland 58, Denmark 56 ()
Scoring by half: 25–23, 24–26 Overtime: 9–7
Pts: Gorin (13)	Pts: Rode (33)

June 6, 1956
10:00

Finland 70, Switzerland 54
Scoring by half: 29–22, 41–32
Pts: Hakola (41)	Pts: Goetschmann (17)

June 6, 1956
11:30

Romania 76, Denmark 26
Scoring by half: 42–18, 34–8
Pts: Antonescu-Niculescu (16)	Pts: Rode (13)

June 8, 1956
10:00

Switzerland 34, Romania 91
Scoring by half: 16–44, 18–47
Pts: Gorin (8)	Pts: Antonescu-Niculescu (23)

June 8, 1956
11:30

Denmark 27, Finland 42
Scoring by half: 14–18, 13–24
Pts: Rode (9)	Pts: Hakola (29)

=== 9th–12th place ===
Classification round
June 9, 1956 – 11:30
Romania	61
Netherlands	49
June 9, 1956 – 22:00
Yugoslavia	61
Finland	39

Ninth place
June 10, 1956 – 10:00
Romania	32
Yugoslavia	44
Eleventh place
June 10, 1956 – 10:30
Netherlands	49
Finland	55

=== 13th–16th place ===
Classification round
June 9, 1956 – 8:30
Switzerland	63
Scotland	50
June 9, 1956 – 10:00
Denmark	34
Germany	30

Thirteenth place
June 10, 1956 – 8:30
Denmark	47
Switzerland	33
Fifteenth place
June 10, 1956 – 9:00
Scotland	30
Germany	49

== Semi-final round ==
The top two from each group advanced to the medal bracket. The 5th–8th spots were decided between the remaining teams in a separate bracket.

=== Group 1 ===
Rank	Team	W	L	Pts	Diff
1	Soviet Union	3	0	6	+84
2	Hungary	2	1	5	+3
3	Poland	1	2	4	−10
4	Italy	0	3	3	−77

June 5, 1956
15:00

Hungary 62, Italy 41
Scoring by half: 26–17, 36–24
Pts: Vekony-Matayne (14)	Pts: Bradamante (14)

June 5, 1956
20:30

Soviet Union 87, Poland 74
Scoring by half: 41–28, 46–46
Pts: Alekseeva (24)	Pts: Gruszczynska-Olesiewicz (26)

June 6, 1956
16:30

Soviet Union 77, Hungary 54
Scoring by half: 37–15, 40–39
Pts: Maksimova (16)	Pts: Nagy (20)

June 6, 1956
19:00

Poland 50, Italy 42
Scoring by half: 20–25, 30–17
Pts: Gruszczynska-Olesiewicz (15)	Pts: Ronchetti (15)

June 8, 1956
16:30

Hungary 46, Poland 41
Scoring by half: 25–18, 21–23
Pts: Fekete-Fischerne (13)	Pts: Gruszczynska-Olesiewicz (16)

June 8, 1956
20:30

Italy 44, Soviet Union 92
Scoring by half: 21–47, 23–45
Pts: Mapelli (13)	Pts: Otsa-Vishneva (22)

=== Group 2 ===
Rank	Team	W	L	Pts	Diff
1	Czechoslovakia	3	0	6	+160
2	Bulgaria	2	1	5	+48
3	France	1	2	4	−49
4	Austria	0	3	3	−159

June 5, 1956
16:30

France 44, Bulgaria 86
Scoring by half: 28–36, 16–50
Pts: Kloechner-Tavert (14)	Pts: Vojnova (23)

June 5, 1956
19:00

Czechoslovakia 145, Austria 36
Scoring by half: 55–17, 90–19
Pts: Stepanova (25)	Pts: Foltinek (12)

June 6, 1956
15:00

Austria 50, Bulgaria 72
Scoring by half: 25–35, 25–37
Pts: Foltinek (19)	Pts: Damianova-Kuzova (14)

June 6, 1956
20:30

Czechoslovakia 81, France 46
Scoring by half: 32–25, 49–21
Pts: Stepanova (30)	Pts: Colchen (9)

June 8, 1956
15:00

France 62, Austria 34
Scoring by half: 30–10, 32–24
Pts: Kloechner-Tavert (26)	Pts: Haselbacher (13)

June 8, 1956
19:00

Bulgaria 75, Czechoslovakia 91
Scoring by half: 36–29, 39–62
Pts: Gospodinova (15)	Pts: Mazlova-Adamirova (26)

=== 5th–8th place ===
Classification round
June 9, 1956 – 14:00
Austria	44
Poland	92
June 9, 1956 – 20:30
France	50
Italy	65

Fifth place
June 10, 1956 – 14:00
Italy	43
Poland	58
Seventh place
June 10, 1956 – 11:30
Austria	42
France	69

=== Medal bracket ===
Classification round
June 9, 1956 – 15:30
Bulgaria	55
Soviet Union	74
June 9, 1956 – 19:00
Czechoslovakia	49
Hungary	50

Gold medal
June 10, 1956 – 19:00
Soviet Union	49
Hungary	41
Bronze medal
June 10, 1956 – 15:30
Bulgaria	60
Czechoslovakia	91

== Final standings ==
Qualified for the 1957 FIBA World Championship for Women

Rank	Team	Record
1st place, gold medalist(s)	Soviet Union	8–0
2nd place, silver medalist(s)	Hungary	6–2
3rd place, bronze medalist(s)	Czechoslovakia	7–1
4	Bulgaria	5–3
5	Poland	5–3
6	Italy	3–5
7	France	4–4
8	Austria	2–6
9	Yugoslavia	6–2
10	Romania	5–3
11	Finland	3–5
12	Netherlands	3–5
13	Denmark	3–5
14	Switzerland	2–6
15	Germany	2–6
16	Scotland	0–8
