= EuroBasket Women 1938 =

EuroBasket 1938 Women
1st FIBA European Women's Basketball Championship

Tournament details
- Host country: Italy
- Dates: October 12 – October 16
- Teams: 5
- Venue: 1 (in 1 host city)

Final positions
- Champions: Italy (1st title)

Official website
- Official website (archive)

The 1938 European Women Basketball Championship was the 1st regional championship held by FIBA Europe for women. The competition was held in Rome, Italy and took place from October 12 to October 16, 1938. Italy won the gold medal and Lithuania the silver medal while Poland won the bronze.

== Results ==
| Pos | Team | Pld | W | L | PF | PA | PD | Pts | |
|---|---|---|---|---|---|---|---|---|---|
| 1 | Italy (H) | 4 | 3 | 1 | 140 | 68 | +72 | 7 (Note: Italy 1–1 (+6), Lithuania 1–1 (–1), Poland 1–1 (–5)) | Champions |
| 2 | Lithuania | 4 | 3 | 1 | 92 | 69 | +23 | 7 | |
| 3 | Poland | 4 | 3 | 1 | 101 | 73 | +28 | 7 | |
| 4 | France | 4 | 1 | 3 | 94 | 96 | −2 | 5 | |
| 5 | Switzerland | 4 | 0 | 4 | 42 | 163 | −121 | 4 | |

Source: Archive FIBA
Rules for classification: 1) Points; 2) Head-to-head results; 3) Points difference; 4) Points scored.
(H) Hosts
Notes:

12 October 1938
| Italy | 34–18 | France |
| Poland | 24–21 | Lithuania |
13 October 1938
| France | 43–18 | Switzerland |
| Lithuania | 23–21 | Italy |
14 October 1938
| Italy | 27–19 | Poland |
| Lithuania | 28–10 | Switzerland |
15 October 1938
| Poland | 34–6 | Switzerland |
| Lithuania | 20–14 | France |
16 October 1938
| Poland | 24–19 | France |
| Italy | 58–8 | Switzerland |

== Final standings ==
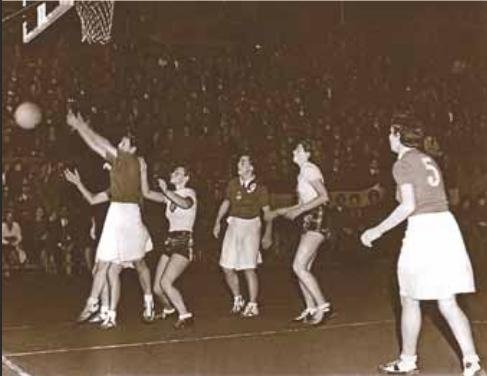
Lithuania and Italy game fragment

| Rank | Team | Record |
|---|---|---|
| Gold medal | Italy | 3–1 |
| Silver medal | Lithuania | 3–1 |
| Bronze medal | Poland | 3–1 |
| 4th | France | 1–3 |
| 5th | Switzerland | 0–4 |
