= Switzerland women's national basketball team =

Switzerland
- FIBA ranking: 49 ▼3 (14 September 2026)
- Joined FIBA: 1932; 94 years ago
- FIBA zone: FIBA Europe
- National federation: Swiss Basketball
- Coach: François Gomez

Olympic Games
- Appearances: None

World Cup
- Appearances: 1

EuroBasket
- Appearances: 5
Home	Away

The Switzerland women's national basketball team represents Switzerland in international women's basketball competitions.

Switzerland was one of the five founding members of the Eurobasket in 1938. In 1953 it also took part in the World Cup's inaugural edition. However, the 1956 EuroBasket marked its last appearance in a final stage to date.

In the 2013 Eurobasket's qualification stage Switzerland faced Poland, Montenegro, Serbia and Estonia. The team achieved two victories, but did not qualify for the final stages there.

== EuroBasket record ==
- 1938 – 5th place
- 1950 – 9th place
- 1952 – 8th place
- 1956 – 14th place
- 2025 – 16th place

== Team ==
=== Current roster ===
Roster for the EuroBasket Women 2025.

Switzerland women's national basketball team roster
Players
Coaches

Pos.	No.	Name	Age – Date of birth	Height	Club	Ctr.
G	2	Laure Margot	26 – 12 June 1999	1.73 m (5 ft 8 in)	Nyon Basket Feminin	(Switzerland)
G	4	Nadia Constantin	28 – 10 February 1997	1.70 m (5 ft 7 in)	BBC Troistorrents-Chablais	(Switzerland)
PG	7	Viktoria Ranisavljevic	19 – 30 July 2005	1.70 m (5 ft 7 in)	Elfic Fribourg	(Switzerland)
F	11	Shannon Hatch	31 – 23 October 1993	1.78 m (5 ft 10 in)	Newcastle Eagles	(United Kingdom)
SG	12	Indira Vilolo Dos Santos	21 – 15 February 2004	1.76 m (5 ft 9 in)	Nyon Basket Feminin	(Switzerland)
PF	13	Léa Favre	28 – 27 January 1997	1.83 m (6 ft 0 in)	Pallacanestro Valdarno	(Italy)
C	15	Lana Wenger	22 – 13 January 2003	1.93 m (6 ft 4 in)	Portland State Vikings	(United States)
F	18	Lin Schwarz	21 – 21 November 2003	1.86 m (6 ft 1 in)	BC Castors Braine	(Belgium)
F	19	Eléa Jacquot	23 – 15 October 2001	1.82 m (6 ft 0 in)	Elfic Fribourg	(Switzerland)
SG	24	Evita Herminjard (C)	27 – 15 February 1998	1.72 m (5 ft 8 in)	Piešťanské Čajky	(Slovakia)
PG	25	Nancy Fora	27 – 17 September 1997	1.72 m (5 ft 8 in)	Tarbes Gespe Bigorre	(France)
PF	98	Yverline Da Silva	27 – 19 January 1998	1.82 m (6 ft 0 in)	Geneve LPLO	(Switzerland)

Head coach

- (France) François Gomez

Assistant coach(es)

- (Switzerland) Romain Gaspoz

Legend

- (C) Team captain
- Club – describes last
  club before the tournament
- Age – describes age
  on 18 June 2025

=== Head coaches ===
- 1980–1984: Milenko Tomić
- 1984-1990: Željko Milković
- 1990-2017: Milenko Tomić

== See also ==
- Switzerland women's national under-19 basketball team
- Switzerland women's national under-17 basketball team
- Switzerland women's national 3x3 team
