= EuroBasket Women 1997 =

1997 edition of the EuroBasket Women

EuroBasket 1997 Women
26th FIBA European Women's Basketball Championship

Tournament details
- Host country: Hungary
- Dates: 6–15 June
- Teams: 12

Final positions
- Champions: Lithuania (1st title)
- Runners-up: Slovakia
- Third place: Germany
- Fourth place: Hungary

Official website
- Official website (archive)

The 1997 European Women Basketball Championship, commonly called EuroBasket Women 1997, was the 26th regional championship held by FIBA Europe. The competition was held in Hungary and took place from 6 June to 15 June 1997. Lithuania won the gold medal and Slovakia the silver medal while Germany won the bronze.

== Qualification ==
=== First stage ===
==== Group A ====
Pl	Team	Pld	W	L	PF	PA
1	Bosnia and Herzegovina	6	6	0	574	419
2	Finland	6	5	1	554	447
3	Belgium	6	4	2	542	408
4	Slovenia	6	3	3	449	463
5	Denmark	5	2	4	453	473
6	(Georgia (country)) Georgia	6	1	5	444	516
7	Scotland	6	0	6	275	565

	(Bosnia and Herzegovina)	(Finland)	(Belgium)	(Slovenia)	(Denmark)	(Georgia (country))	(Scotland)
(Bosnia and Herzegovina) Bosnia and H.		101–90	98–78	100–52	88–76	92–70	95–53
Finland			89–77	79–69	87–77	112–78	97–45
Belgium				92–71	95–59	78–63	122–28
Slovenia					77–74	94–77	86–41
Denmark						84–74	83–52
(Georgia (country)) Georgia							82–56
Scotland							

==== Group B ====
Pl	Team	Pld	W	L	PF	PA
1	Bulgaria	7	6	1	542	455
2	Israel	7	6	1	586	462
3	Greece	7	5	2	579	393
4	Belarus	7	5	2	628	508
5	Albania	7	4	4	524	567
6	Switzerland	7	2	5	475	615
7	(Republic of Ireland) Ireland	7	1	6	416	561
8	Austria	7	0	7	456	644

	(Bulgaria)	(Israel)	(Greece)	(Belarus)	(Albania)	(Switzerland)	(Republic of Ireland)	(Austria)
Bulgaria		81–70	67–64		75–58	99–57	80–63	88–56
Israel			66–65	84–73	100–58	89–70	80–56	97–59
Greece				86–77	73–52	101–52	86–29	104–50
Belarus	87–52				102–78	96–82	84–50	109–76
Albania						96–74	93–71	89–72
Switzerland							67–62	73–72
(Republic of Ireland) Ireland								84–71
Austria								

==== Group C ====
Pl	Team	Pld	W	L	PF	PA
1	Poland	7	7	0	629	441
2	Sweden	7	5	2	478	382
3	Portugal	7	4	3	447	414
4	Netherlands	7	4	3	492	414
5	Turkey	7	4	3	470	437
6	Latvia	7	3	4	547	445
7	England	7	1	6	398	492
8	Azerbaijan	7	0	7	275	711

	(Poland)	(Sweden)	(Portugal)	(Netherlands)	(Turkey)	(Latvia)	(England)	(Azerbaijan)
Poland		84–71	74–66	74–68	83–68	96–82	90–52	128–34
Sweden			61–43	56–53		60–59	67–50	95–21
Portugal				62–60	70–57		57–49	91–42
Netherlands					42–40	84–69	80–63	105–50
Turkey		72–68				67–61	74–59	92–54
Latvia			71–58				87–43	118–37
England								82–37
Azerbaijan								

=== Second stage ===
==== Group A ====
Pl	Team	Pld	W	L	PF	PA
1	Slovakia	5	5	0	409	289
2	Russia	5	4	1	426	307
3	(Federal Republic of Yugoslavia) Yugoslavia	5	3	2	354	375
4	Romania	5	2	3	298	346
5	Portugal	5	1	4	290	360
6	Sweden	5	0	5	302	402

	(Slovakia)	(Russia)	(Federal Republic of Yugoslavia)	(Romania)	(Portugal)	(Sweden)
Slovakia		82–81	81–54	62–57	90–47	94–49
Russia			92–66	79–41	83–60	91–58
(Federal Republic of Yugoslavia) Yugoslavia				81–69	68–59	85–74
Romania					63–59	68–65
Portugal						64–56
Sweden						

==== Group B ====
Pl	Team	Pld	W	L	PF	PA
1	Czech Republic	5	4	1	419	417
2	Lithuania	5	3	2	436	421
3	Bosnia and Herzegovina	5	3	2	426	405
4	France	5	3	2	396	387
5	Finland	5	2	3	424	434
6	Poland	5	0	5	387	424

	(Czech Republic)	(Lithuania)	(Bosnia and Herzegovina)	(France)	(Finland)	(Poland)
Czech Republic		85–82	101–88		88–85	75–73
Lithuania			88–81	75–74		98–79
(Bosnia and Herzegovina) Bosnia and H.				85–73	96–80	76–73
France	89–70				72–70	88–87
Finland		102–93				87–85
Poland						

==== Group C ====
Pl	Team	Pld	W	L	PF	PA
1	Spain	5	4	1	425	332
2	Germany	5	3	2	379	386
3	Moldova	5	3	2	354	382
4	Bulgaria	5	2	3	354	373
5	Croatia	5	2	3	372	362
6	Israel	5	1	4	345	394

	(Spain)	(Germany)	(Moldova)	(Bulgaria)	(Croatia)	(Israel)
Spain		95–62	95–62	81–73		83–52
Germany			75–58	82–76		87–70
Moldova				80–62	69–68	85–82
Bulgaria					75–63	68–67
Croatia	83–71	87–73				
Israel					74–71	

== First stage ==
=== Group A ===
Pl	Team	Pld	W	L	PF	PA
1	Lithuania	5	4	1	394	368
2	Spain	5	3	2	382	361
3	Germany	5	3	2	389	373
4	(Federal Republic of Yugoslavia) Yugoslavia	5	3	2	378	388
5	Ukraine	5	2	3	377	380
6	Czech Republic	5	0	5	366	416

	(Lithuania)	(Spain)	(Germany)	(Federal Republic of Yugoslavia)	(Ukraine)	(Czech Republic)
Lithuania		78–67	75–67		73–70	89–82
Spain				86–71	72–62	82–78
Germany		72-71			92–88	85–65
(Federal Republic of Yugoslavia) Yugoslavia	82–79		74–73			84–69
Ukraine				81–67		76–72
Czech Republic						

=== Group B ===
Pl	Team	Pld	W	L	PF	PA
1	Slovakia	5	4	1	350	309
2	Russia	5	3	2	357	328
3	Hungary	5	3	2	357	341
4	Moldova	5	2	3	334	357
5	Bosnia and Herzegovina	5	2	3	368	370
6	Italy	5	1	4	324	385

	(Slovakia)	(Russia)	(Hungary)	(Moldova)	(Bosnia and Herzegovina)	(Italy)
Slovakia		81–73		70–55	64–53	81–55
Russia			75–66	68–53		66–52
Hungary	73–54			76–75	73–67	
Moldova					79–75	72–68
(Bosnia and Herzegovina) Bosnia and H.		76–75				97–79
Italy			70–69			

== Final stages ==
Quarter-finals
Lithuania	68
Moldova	53
Russia	57
Germany	74
Slovakia	66
(Federal Republic of Yugoslavia) Yugoslavia	57
Spain	70
Hungary	84

Semi-finals
Lithuania	78
Germany	77
Slovakia	81
Hungary	55

Final
Lithuania	72
Slovakia	62
Third place
Germany	86
Hungary	61

1997 FIBA European Women's Basketball Championship champion

Lithuania
First title

== Placement stages ==
First round
Moldova	73
Russia	76
(Federal Republic of Yugoslavia) Yugoslavia	47
Spain	71

Fifth place
Russia	77
Spain	82
Seventh place
Moldova	66
(Federal Republic of Yugoslavia) Yugoslavia	56

First round
Ukraine	75
Italy	73
Bosnia and Herzegovina	62
Czech Republic	91

Ninth place
Ukraine	76
Czech Republic	90
Eleventh place
Italy	71
Bosnia and Herzegovina	64

== Final standings ==
Place	Team	PE
Gold medal	Lithuania	▲4
Silver medal	Slovakia	▲2
Bronze medal	Germany	▲11
4	Hungary	▲8
5	Spain	▲4
6	Russia	▼3
7	Moldova	▼1
8	(Federal Republic of Yugoslavia) Yugoslavia	▲2
9	Czech Republic	▼2
10	Ukraine	▼9
11	Italy	▼9
12	Bosnia and Herzegovina	New entry
