= Albania women's national basketball team =

Albania
- FIBA ranking: 90 (18 March 2026)
- Joined FIBA: 1939
- FIBA zone: FIBA Europe
- National federation: Albanian Basketball Association
- Coach: Klaudio Ndoja
- Nickname(s): Kuq e Zinjtë (The Red and Blacks)

Olympic Games
- Appearances: None

World Cup
- Appearances: None

EuroBasket
- Appearances: None

Championship for Small Countries
- Appearances: 4
- Medals: Gold: 2002; Silver: 1996, 2008 Bronze: 2024

Mediterranean Games
- Appearances: 3
- Medals: Gold: 1987
Home	Away

The Albania women's national basketball team (Albanian: Kombëtarja e Femrave) represents Albania in international women's basketball competitions, and is controlled by the Albanian Basketball Federation.

== History ==
Albania women's national basketball team are quite successful in European Basketball. Being successful at the Mediterranean Games an international sports competition they would win successfully in 1987 at the finals against the women's from Turkey, in their first ever appearance.

The Albanian women's would compete in two competitions such as the International Mediterranean Games in which, they qualify three times for Basketball at the Mediterranean Games first in basketball at the 1987 Mediterranean Games in Latakia, Syria. Then in 1991 in Athens, Greece and recently in 2009 in Pescara, Italy. The Albanian women's would also compete at the FIBA Women's European Championship for Small Countries three times as well in their history first in 1996. Winning this tournament in 2002 against Iceland in the finals.

The Albanian women's national basketball team are the most successful national team for Albania in basketball winning two gold medals in European and International competitions. First in 1987 and in 2002 as well. They would also win two silver medals at the Small Countries tournament first in 1996 and later in 2008. They won four medals in their successful basketball history.

=== Mediterranean Games ===
Their biggest success came in their first ever appearance in Basketball at the 1987 Mediterranean Games in Latakia in which they would beat the Turkey women's national basketball team in the finals to win this competition, in their first ever appearance. It is their one and only international competition win in their history. Despite that it is the biggest success for Albania in International or European Basketball.

In their next two appearances the Albanian women could not repeat the success they had in their first campaign. In their next campaign in Basketball at the 1991 Mediterranean Games in Greece. The Albanian women's were not able to repeat their success and finish fifth at the end behind Spain, France and Greece.

The Albanian women's would lately compete for the Basketball at the 2009 Mediterranean Games in Italy. In Group A they would face Croatia and Italy. The Albanian women's were this time without any chances losing both matches heavily in the process. Albania would then receive a bye in the semifinals for the fifth place bracket, owing to the competition having only seven nations participating. It would be their final appearance in any international competition todate for the Albanian women's national basketball team.

==== 2009 Mediterranean Games ====
Preliminary Round

	Team	Pts	Pl	W	L	PF	PA	PD
1.	Croatia	4	2	2	0	219	106	+113
2.	Italy	3	2	1	1	189	124	+65
3.	Albania	2	2	0	2	70	248	–178

- June 27, 2009

Croatia	130 – 35	Albania

- June 28, 2009

Italy	118 – 35	Albania

The Albania women's team would then face Turkey in the finals. This time around they couldn't beat the opposition like they did previously in their winning campaign. They would lose despite an improved performance at the end with 60–89. Finishing their third and final appearance in the Mediterranean Games at the 6th place out of seven nations.

Final for the 5th place

Albania 60 - 89 Turkey

=== Small countries championships (1996 - 2008) ===
The Albanian women's would also participate three times in the FIBA Women's European Championship for Small Countries first in 1996 and for the latest participation in Luxemburg 2008 as well. Showing in all of the three tournaments they participated some good results. In their first participation in the Small Countries championship in Malta 1996 the Albanian women would lose in the finals against Iceland with a result of 81–73 at the end. Albania then once again competed in this Competition in Andorra 2002 this time around the Albanian women's took revenge on Iceland and would win this competition for the first time with an impressive display, they could beat them with a result of 84–79 in the process. It was for the Albanian women their second gold medal in any European or World Basketball competition in their history. Winning all of their five matches in their campaign. Still their latest title win in their Basketball history. In their third and final campaign in the Small Countries Championship in 2008 Luxemburg edition. For the third time straight they would reach the finals in this competition but lost at the finals against Malta with 61-81 missing out on their second title at this tournament.

==== FIBA Women's European Championship for Small Countries in Valletta 1996 ====
For the Albanian women's national Basketball team their first final in nine years and it is their first medal win in nine years as well. Winning at the end the silver medal in the process.

Final

Iceland 81 - 73 Albania

==== FIBA Women's European Championship for Small Countries in Andorra 2002 ====
For the Albanian women's national Basketball team their first gold medal in this competition. Their second final against the Iceland women's national basketball team as well. It would be their first gold medal in 15 years after their win at the 1987 Mediterranean Games in Syria. It is for the Albanian women's their last gold medal.

Final

Albania 84–79 Iceland

==== FIBA Women's European Championship for Small Countries in Luxemburg 2008 ====
Despite the loss against the Malta women's national basketball team Albania would win silver once again. The Albanian women's would reach, in all off their three appearances, the final at this tournament after six years of wait. They won their third and final medal at this competition. One gold and two silver medals at the end. It would be until this day their last final they would participate as a Basketball National team in their history.

Final

Malta 81 - 61 Albania

The Albanians women's could not qualify for any other tournament since their latest participation in Basketball at the 2009 Mediterranean Games.

== Competitions ==
=== FIBA Women's European Championship for Small Countries ===
Year	Pos	Pld	W	L	PF	PA
(Luxembourg) 1989	did not enter					
(Gibraltar) 1991	did not enter					
(Cyprus) 1993	did not enter					
(Malta) 1996	2nd	5	4	1		
(Austria) 1998	did not enter					
(Austria) 2000	did not enter					
(Andorra) 2002	1st	4	4	0	351	266
(Malta) 2004	did not enter					
(Austria) 2006	did not enter					
(Luxembourg) 2008	2nd	5	3	2	338	338
(Armenia) 2010	did not enter					
(North Macedonia) 2012	did not enter					
(Austria) 2014	did not enter					
(Gibraltar) 2016	did not enter					
(Republic of Ireland) 2018	did not enter					
(Cyprus) 2021	did not enter					
(Cyprus) 2022	did not enter					
(Kosovo) 2024	3rd	5	3	2	322	347
Total	4/17	19	14	5	1011	951

=== Mediterranean Games ===
Year	Round	Position
(Syria) 1987	Finals	1st
(Greece) 1991	Preliminary Round	5th
(Italy) 2009	Preliminary Round	6th

== Team ==
=== Current roster ===
Albania women's national basketball team roster
Players
Coaches

Pos.	No.	Name	Age – Date of birth	Height	Club	Ctr.
SG	4	Fabiola Permeti	28 – 26 August 1987	1.76 m (5 ft 9 in)	Goga Basket	(Albania)
SF	5	Elektra Zykaj	25 – 20 August 1990	1.81 m (5 ft 11 in)	PBC Flamurtari	(Albania)
PF	6	Ornela Lalaj	21 – 12 April 1994	1.78 m (5 ft 10 in)	Studenti Tiranë	(Albania)
C	8	Sara Gjoni	21 – 4 September 1994	1.85 m (6 ft 1 in)	PBC Tirana	(Albania)
PG	9	Eliverta Bujari	29 – 31 October 1986	1.70 m (5 ft 7 in)	PBC Tirana	(Albania)
PF	10	Gera Bujari	26 – 20 September 1989	1.82 m (6 ft 0 in)	PBC Tirana	(Albania)
SF	12	Ebi Dishnica	18 – 24 February 1997	1.82 m (6 ft 0 in)	Goga Basket	(Albania)
PF	13	Edona Berranija	20 – 12 September 1995	1.79 m (5 ft 10 in)	BC Vllaznia	(Albania)
C	14	Adelajda Aliaj	28 – 16 May 1987	1.90 m (6 ft 3 in)	PBC Tirana	(Albania)
PG	17	Gridi Sokoli	25 – 21 June 1990	1.69 m (5 ft 7 in)	BC Kamza Basket	(Albania)
PG	21	Enkeleda Llazari	26 – 20 August 1989	1.60 m (5 ft 3 in)	Skënderbeu Korçë	(Albania)
PG	44	Artemida Myrto	28 – 25 November 1987	1.75 m (5 ft 9 in)	PBC Flamurtari	(Albania)
SG		Orjeta Basha	22 – 31 August 1993	1.75 m (5 ft 9 in)	BC Vllaznia	(Albania)
SG		Alba Dashja	24 – 1 November 1991	1.73 m (5 ft 8 in)	BC Vllaznia	(Albania)
PF		Ingrit Dashja	22 – 2 April 1993	1.79 m (5 ft 10 in)	BC Vllaznia	(Albania)
SG		Rezarta Hoxhaj	33 – 21 March 1982	1.78 m (5 ft 10 in)	PBC Tirana	(Albania)
PG		Dorina Mehmeti	28 – 16 July 1987	1.67 m (5 ft 6 in)	BC Apolonia	(Albania)
SG		Dorina Mema	24 – 30 March 1991	1.72 m (5 ft 8 in)	Studenti Tiranë	(Albania)
PF		Aida Palko	31 – 9 March 1984	1.76 m (5 ft 9 in)	PBC Flamurtari	(Albania)
SF		Eli Papa	20 – 21 October 1995	1.80 m (5 ft 11 in)	Skënderbeu Korçë	(Albania)
G		Igena Qypi	25 – 29 January 1990	1.79 m (5 ft 10 in)	Goga Basket	(Albania)
SG		Enisa Semanjaku	27 – 11 June 1988	1.80 m (5 ft 11 in)	BC Apolonia	(Albania)
SF		Enxhi Xhanaj	21 – 17 April 1994	1.80 m (5 ft 11 in)	Goga Basket	(Albania)

Head coach

- (Albania) Erdal Borova

Legend

- Club – describes last
  club before the competition
- Age – describes age
  as of 19 July 2015

== See also ==
- Albania women's national under-19 basketball team
- Albania women's national under-17 basketball team
- Albania men's national basketball team
