= 2026 FIBA Women's European Championship for Small Countries =

Tournament details
- Host country: Kosovo
- City: Peja
- Dates: 23–28 June 2026
- Teams: 6 (from 1 confederation)
- Venue: 1 (in 1 host city)

Final positions
- Champions: Malta (4th title)
- Runners-up: Albania
- Third place: Kosovo

Tournament statistics
- MVP: (Malta) Amber Melgoza

Official website
- www.fiba.basketball

The 2026 FIBA Women's European Championship for Small Countries was the 19th edition of this competition. The tournament was played in Peja, Kosovo, from 23 to 28 June 2026.

Malta secured their fourth overall title with a victory over Albania in the final, 72–55.

== Participating teams ==
Country	Last	Best placement in tournament	WR (Note: As of March 2026)
Albania	2024	Champions (2002)	90
Andorra	2024	Third place (2000)	106
Armenia	2024	Runners-up (2010)	88
Georgia	2024	8th place (2024)	119
Kosovo	2024	Third place (2021)	85
Malta	2024	Champions (2008, 2010, 2016)	82

== First round ==
The draw of the first round was held on 5 February 2026 in Freising, Germany.

In the first round, the teams were drawn into two groups of three. The first two teams from each group advanced to the semifinals; the third-placed teams were dropped to the 5th place game.

All times are local (Central European Summer Time; UTC+2).

=== Group A ===
Pos	Team	Pld	W	L	PF	PA	PD	Pts	Qualification
1	Malta	2	2	0	164	112	+52	4	Semifinals
2	Albania	2	1	1	157	145	+12	3	Semifinals
3	Georgia	2	0	2	131	195	−64	2	5th place game

Source: FIBA

23 June 2026
16:30

Boxscore

Albania	59–67	Malta
Scoring by quarter: 17–27, 16–13, 8–16, 18–11
Pts: Rreshpja, Pellumbi 13; Rebs: Lalaj 14; Asts: Rreshpja 3		Pts: Melgoza 38; Rebs: Melgoza 20; Asts: Abela 4

Karagaq Sports Hall, Peja
Attendance: 50
Referees: Bogna Podkowińska (POL), Romana Stojanović (CRO), Davit Kikhyan (ARM)

24 June 2026
16:30

Boxscore

Malta	97–53	Georgia
Scoring by quarter: 29–17, 27–15, 19–13, 22–8
Pts: Melgoza 35; Rebs: Melgoza 9 Asts: Abela, Diaby 5		Pts: Tsomaia, Tsivtsivadze 11; Rebs: Barbakadze 8 Asts: Tsomaia 3

Karagaq Sports Hall, Peja
Attendance: 50
Referees: Silvia Marziali (ITA), Romana Stojanović (CRO), Elldin Uglari (KOS)

25 June 2026
16:30

Boxscore

Georgia	78–98	Albania
Scoring by quarter: 20–19, 15–27, 24–18, 19–34
Pts: Papuashvili 18; Rebs: Kavtaradze, Barbakadze 9 Asts: Tsivtsivadze 7		Pts: Rreshpja 25; Rebs: Lalaj 15; Asts: Lalaj 10

Karagaq Sports Hall, Peja
Attendance: 50
Referees: Bogna Podkowińska (POL), Suzana Vujičić (MNE), Davit Kikhyan (ARM)

=== Group B ===
Pos	Team	Pld	W	L	PF	PA	PD	Pts	Qualification
1	Kosovo (H)	2	2	0	157	83	+74	4	Semifinals
2	Armenia	2	1	1	107	126	−19	3	Semifinals
3	Andorra	2	0	2	93	148	−55	2	5th place game

Source: FIBA
(H) Hosts

23 June 2026
19:00

Boxscore

Armenia	44–72	Kosovo
Scoring by quarter: 6–8, 16–22, 6–26, 16–16
Pts: Tirityan 10; Rebs: Vartazarian, Tirityan 6 Asts: six players 1		Pts: three players 9 Rebs: Muhadri 12; Asts: Daci 4

Karagaq Sports Hall, Peja
Attendance: 300
Referees: Silvia Marziali (ITA), Ema Nikočevikj (MKD), Marina Shalamberidze (GEO)

24 June 2026
19:00

Boxscore

Kosovo	85–39	Andorra
Scoring by quarter: 18–3, 26–14, 22–12, 19–10
Pts: Rrahmani 16; Rebs: Muhadri 13; Asts: Muhadri 4		Pts: Andres, Rodriguez 8 Rebs: Laurent, Rodriguez 6 Asts: Collado 3

Karagaq Sports Hall, Peja
Attendance: 150
Referees: Suzana Vujičić (MNE), Edison Gjoni (ALB), Ema Nikočevikj (MKD)

25 June 2026
19:00

Boxscore

Andorra	54–63	Armenia
Scoring by quarter: 18–16, 14–13, 17–22, 5–12
Pts: Collado 15; Rebs: Rodriguez 4 Asts: Laurent 4		Pts: Krumian 25; Rebs: Tirityan 10; Asts: Keshmeshian 4

Karagaq Sports Hall, Peja
Attendance: 50
Referees: Edison Gjoni (ALB), Elldin Uglari (KOS), Marina Shalamberidze (GEO)

== 5th place game ==
28 June 2026
14:00

Boxscore

Georgia	78–57	Andorra
Scoring by quarter: 25–14, 15–17, 16–12, 22–14
Pts: Papuashvili 15; Rebs: Barbakadze, Tsivtsivadze 14; Asts: Tsivtsivadze 9		Pts: Mico 11; Rebs: three players 6 Asts: Andres 5

Karagaq Sports Hall, Peja
Attendance: 10
Referees: Edison Gjoni (ALB), Elldin Uglari (KOS), Davit Kikhyan (ARM)

== Championship playoffs ==
=== Bracket ===
Semifinals
27 June
Malta	107
Armenia	52
27 June
Kosovo	62
Albania	66

Final
28 June
Malta	72
Albania	55
3rd place game
28 June
Armenia	52
Kosovo	86

=== Semifinals ===
27 June 2026
16:30

Boxscore

Malta	107–52	Armenia
Scoring by quarter: 32–6, 28–14, 20–11, 27–21
Pts: Melgoza 36; Rebs: Melgoza 11; Asts: Galea 8		Pts: Grigoryan 9 Rebs: Krumian 4 Asts: Krumian 2

Karagaq Sports Hall, Peja
Attendance: 30
Referees: Bogna Podkowińska (POL), Romana Stojanović (CRO), Ema Nikočevikj (MKD)

27 June 2026
19:00

Boxscore

Kosovo	62–66	Albania
Scoring by quarter: 12–15, 11–15, 18–20, 21–16
Pts: Tuhina 24; Rebs: Muhadri 12; Asts: Tuhina 4		Pts: Semanjaku 21; Rebs: Lalaj 20; Asts: Semanjaku 4

Karagaq Sports Hall, Peja
Attendance: 200
Referees: Silvia Marziali (ITA), Suzana Vujičić (MNE), Marina Shalamberidze (GEO)

=== 3rd place game ===
28 June 2026
16:30

Boxscore

Armenia	52–86	Kosovo
Scoring by quarter: 16–27, 11–26, 14–20, 11–13
Pts: Keshmeshian 15; Rebs: Tirityan 14; Asts: Markaryan 3		Pts: Kamerolli 20; Rebs: Muhadri 9 Asts: Kamerolli 6

Karagaq Sports Hall, Peja
Attendance: 100
Referees: Silvia Marziali (ITA), Suzana Vujičić (MNE), Ema Nikočevikj (MKD)

=== Final ===
28 June 2026
19:00

Boxscore

Malta	72–55	Albania
Scoring by quarter: 29–13, 15–10, 13–15, 15–17
Pts: Melgoza 29; Rebs: Bonett 8 Asts: Abela 9		Pts: Rreshpja 17; Rebs: Lalaj 13; Asts: Pellumbi 5

Karagaq Sports Hall, Peja
Attendance: 100
Referees: Bogna Podkowińska (POL), Romana Stojanović (CRO), Marina Shalamberidze (GEO)

== Final standings ==
Rank	Team	Record
1st place, gold medalist(s)	Malta	4–0
2nd place, silver medalist(s)	Albania	2–2
3rd place, bronze medalist(s)	Kosovo	3–1
4th	Armenia	1–3
5th	Georgia	1–2
6th	Andorra	0–3

2026 FIBA Women's European Championship for Small Countries winners

Malta
Fourth title

Team roster:
Head coach:

== Statistics and awards ==
=== Awards ===
The All-Tournament team and MVP award was announced on 28 June 2026.

All-Tournament Team
Guard	Forwards	Centers
(Malta) Amber Melgoza (Albania) Ornela Lalaj	(Albania) Enisa Semanjaku (Kosovo) Astera Tuhina	(Kosovo) Saranda Daci
MVP: (Malta) Amber Melgoza
