= 2004 European Promotion Cup for Women =

Tournament details
- Host country: Andorra
- City: Andorra la Vella
- Dates: 26–31 July 2004
- Teams: 10 (from 1 confederation)
- Venue(s): 1 (in 1 host city)

Final positions
- Champions: Iceland (2nd title)
- Runners-up: Luxembourg
- Third place: Malta

The 2004 European Promotion Cup for Women was the eighth edition of the basketball European Promotion Cup for Women, today known as FIBA Women's European Championship for Small Countries. The tournament took place in Andorra la Vella, Andorra, from 26 to 31 July 2004. Iceland women's national basketball team won the tournament for the second time.

== Participating teams ==
- Andorra
- Armenia
- Azerbaijan
- Cyprus
- Gibraltar
- Iceland
- Luxembourg
- Malta
- Scotland
- Wales

== First round ==
In the first round, the teams were drawn into two groups of five. The winners of each group advance to the final, the other teams will play their respective classification matches.

=== Group A ===
Pos	Team	Pld	W	L	PF	PA	PD	Pts	Qualification
1	Iceland	4	3	1	330	210	+120	7	Final
2	Malta	4	3	1	254	222	+32	7	3rd place match
3	Scotland	4	2	2	232	273	−41	6	5th place match
4	Azerbaijan	4	2	2	280	280	0	6	7th place match
5	Andorra	4	0	4	181	292	−111	4	9th place match

Source: FIBA Archive

26 July 2004

Boxscore

Scotland	44–85	Iceland

26 July 2004

Boxscore

Malta	67–31	Andorra

27 July 2004

Boxscore

Azerbaijan	68–72	Malta

27 July 2004

Boxscore

Andorra	59–62	Scotland

28 July 2004

Boxscore

Scotland	87–72	Azerbaijan

28 July 2004

Boxscore

Iceland	96–35	Andorra

29 July 2004

Boxscore

Malta	57–39	Scotland

29 July 2004

Boxscore

Azerbaijan	73–65	Iceland

30 July 2004

Boxscore

Iceland	84–58	Malta

30 July 2004

Boxscore

Andorra	56–67	Azerbaijan

=== Group B ===
Pos	Team	Pld	W	L	PF	PA	PD	Pts	Qualification
1	Luxembourg	4	4	0	388	142	+246	8	Final
2	Armenia	4	3	1	248	215	+33	7	3rd place match
3	Cyprus	4	2	2	256	209	+47	6	5th place match
4	Gibraltar	4	1	3	153	288	−135	5	7th place match
5	Wales	4	0	4	163	354	−191	4	9th place match

Source: FIBA Archive

26 July 2004

Boxscore

Cyprus	55–56	Armenia

26 July 2004

Boxscore

Wales	48–56	Gibraltar

27 July 2004

Boxscore

Luxembourg	137–24	Wales

27 July 2004

Boxscore

Gibraltar	42–69	Cyprus

28 July 2004

Boxscore

Cyprus	45–66	Luxembourg

28 July 2004

Boxscore

Armenia	71–29	Gibraltar

29 July 2004

Boxscore

Wales	45–87	Cyprus

29 July 2004

Boxscore

Luxembourg	85–47	Armenia

30 July 2004

Boxscore

Gibraltar	26–100	Luxembourg

30 July 2004

Boxscore

Armenia	74–46	Wales

== 9th place match ==
31 July 2004

Boxscore

Andorra	55–39	Wales

== 7th place match ==
31 July 2004

Boxscore

Azerbaijan	81–38	Gibraltar

== 5th place match ==
31 July 2004

Boxscore

Scotland	59–49	Cyprus

== 3rd place match ==
31 July 2004

Boxscore

Malta	69–61	Armenia

== Final ==
31 July 2004

Boxscore

Iceland	81–66	Luxembourg

== Final standings ==
Rank	Team
1st place, gold medalist(s)	Iceland
2nd place, silver medalist(s)	Luxembourg
3rd place, bronze medalist(s)	Malta
4	Armenia
5	Scotland
6	Cyprus
7	Azerbaijan
8	Gibraltar
9	Andorra
10	Wales
