= 1996 European Promotion Cup for Women =

Tournament details
- Host country: Malta
- City: Valletta
- Dates: 26–30 June 1996
- Teams: 8 (from 1 confederation)
- Venue: 1 (in 1 host city)

Final positions
- Champions: Iceland (1st title)
- Runners-up: Albania
- Third place: Luxembourg

Official website
- www.fibaeurope.com

The 1996 European Promotion Cup for Women was the fourth edition of the basketball European Promotion Cup for Women, today known as FIBA Women's European Championship for Small Countries. The tournament took place in Valletta, Malta, from 26 to 30 June 1996. Iceland women's national basketball team won the tournament for the first time.

== Participating teams ==
- Albania
- Andorra
- Cyprus
- Gibraltar
- Iceland
- Luxembourg
- Malta
- Wales

== First round ==
In the first round, the teams were drawn into two groups of four. The first two teams from each group advance to the semifinals, the other teams will play in the 5th–8th place playoffs.

=== Group A ===
Pos	Team	Pld	W	L	PF	PA	PD	Pts	Qualification
1	Iceland	3	3	0	263	130	+133	6	Semifinals
2	Cyprus	3	2	1	196	199	−3	5	Semifinals
3	Malta	3	1	2	218	235	−17	4	5th–8th place playoffs
4	Andorra	3	0	3	164	277	−113	3	5th–8th place playoffs

Source: FIBA Archive

26 June 1996

Boxscore

Iceland	100–39	Andorra

26 June 1996

Boxscore

Cyprus	76–70	Malta

27 June 1996

Boxscore

Andorra	58–79	Cyprus

27 June 1996

Boxscore

Malta	50–92	Iceland

28 June 1996

Boxscore

Iceland	71–41	Cyprus

28 June 1996

Boxscore

Malta	98–67	Andorra

=== Group B ===
Pos	Team	Pld	W	L	PF	PA	PD	Pts	Qualification
1	Albania	3	3	0	264	138	+126	6	Semifinals
2	Luxembourg	3	2	1	194	146	+48	5	Semifinals
3	Wales	3	1	2	140	245	−105	4	5th–8th place playoffs
4	Gibraltar	3	0	3	138	207	−69	3	5th–8th place playoffs

Source: FIBA Archive

26 June 1996

Boxscore

Luxembourg	42–38	Gibraltar

26 June 1996

Boxscore

Albania	95–36	Wales

27 June 1996

Boxscore

Wales	39–86	Luxembourg

27 June 1996

Boxscore

Gibraltar	36–100	Albania

28 June 1996

Boxscore

Luxembourg	66–69	Albania

28 June 1996

Boxscore

Wales	65–64	Gibraltar

== 5th–8th place playoffs ==
5th–8th place semifinals
A4	Andorra	53
B3	Wales	65
B4	Gibraltar	59
A3	Malta	67

5th place match
B3	Wales	64
A3	Malta	77
7th place match
A4	Andorra	51
B4	Gibraltar	90

=== 5th–8th place semifinals ===
29 June 1996

Boxscore

Andorra	53–65	Wales

29 June 1996

Boxscore

Gibraltar	59–67	Malta

=== 7th place match ===
30 June 1996

Boxscore

Andorra	51–90	Gibraltar

=== 5th place match ===
30 June 1996

Boxscore

Wales	64–77	Malta

== Championship playoffs ==
Semifinals
A2	Cyprus	64
B1	Albania	74
B2	Luxembourg	55
A1	Iceland	59

Final
B1	Albania	73
A1	Iceland	81
3rd place match
A2	Cyprus	58
B2	Luxembourg	65

=== Semifinals ===
29 June 1996

Boxscore

Cyprus	64–74	Albania

29 June 1996

Boxscore

Luxembourg	55–59	Iceland

=== 3rd place match ===
30 June 1996

Boxscore

Cyprus	58–65	Luxembourg

=== Final ===
30 June 1996

Boxscore

Albania	73–81	Iceland

== Final standings ==
Rank	Team
1st place, gold medalist(s)	Iceland
2nd place, silver medalist(s)	Albania
3rd place, bronze medalist(s)	Luxembourg
4	Cyprus
5	Malta
6	Wales
7	Gibraltar
8	Andorra
