= 1998 European Promotion Cup for Women =

Tournament details
- Host country: Austria
- City: Oberpullendorf
- Dates: 16–20 June 1998
- Teams: 8 (from 1 confederation)
- Venue: 1 (in 1 host city)

Final positions
- Champions: Austria (3rd title)
- Runners-up: Luxembourg
- Third place: Cyprus

The 1998 European Promotion Cup for Women was the fifth edition of the basketball European Promotion Cup for Women, today known as FIBA Women's European Championship for Small Countries. The tournament took place in Oberpullendorf, Austria, from 16 to 20 June 1998. Austria women's national basketball team won the tournament for the third time.

== Participating teams ==
- Armenia
- Austria
- Cyprus
- Gibraltar
- Iceland
- Luxembourg
- Malta
- Wales

== First round ==
In the first round, the teams were drawn into two groups of four. The first two teams from each group advance to the semifinals, the other teams will play in the 5th–8th place playoffs.

=== Group A ===
Pos	Team	Pld	W	L	PF	PA	PD	Pts	Qualification
1	Luxembourg	3	3	0	190	144	+46	6	Semifinals
2	Iceland	3	2	1	209	136	+73	5	Semifinals
3	Malta	3	1	2	162	185	−23	4	5th–8th place playoffs
4	Gibraltar	3	0	3	119	215	−96	3	5th–8th place playoffs

Source: FIBA Archive

16 June 1998

Boxscore

Iceland	48–56	Luxembourg

16 June 1998

Boxscore

Malta	55–50	Gibraltar

17 June 1998

Boxscore

Gibraltar	29–90	Iceland

17 June 1998

Boxscore

Luxembourg	64–56	Malta

18 June 1998

Boxscore

Iceland	71–51	Malta

18 June 1998

Boxscore

Gibraltar	40–70	Luxembourg

=== Group B ===
Pos	Team	Pld	W	L	PF	PA	PD	Pts	Qualification
1	Austria	3	3	0	259	85	+174	6	Semifinals
2	Cyprus	3	2	1	155	158	−3	5	Semifinals
3	Armenia	3	1	2	143	204	−61	4	5th–8th place playoffs
4	Wales	3	0	3	103	213	−110	3	5th–8th place playoffs

Source: FIBA Archive

16 June 1998

Boxscore

Austria	73–24	Cyprus

16 June 1998

Boxscore

Armenia	63–37	Wales

17 June 1998

Boxscore

Armenia	30–100	Austria

17 June 1998

Boxscore

Cyprus	64–35	Wales

18 June 1998

Boxscore

Austria	86–31	Wales

18 June 1998

Boxscore

Armenia	50–67	Cyprus

== 5th–8th place playoffs ==
5th–8th place semifinals
A4	Gibraltar	62
B3	Armenia	59
B4	Wales	50
A3	Malta	56

5th place match
A4	Gibraltar	51
A3	Malta	62
7th place match
B3	Armenia	42
B4	Wales	41

=== 5th–8th place semifinals ===
19 June 1998

Boxscore

Gibraltar	62–59	Armenia

19 June 1998

Boxscore

Wales	50–56	Malta

=== 7th place match ===
20 June 1998

Boxscore

Armenia	42–41	Wales

=== 5th place match ===
20 June 1998

Boxscore

Gibraltar	51–62	Malta

== Championship playoffs ==
Semifinals
A2	Iceland	45
B1	Austria	65
B2	Cyprus	62
A1	Luxembourg	71

Finals
B1	Austria	85
A1	Luxembourg	45
3rd place match
A2	Iceland	51
B2	Cyprus	53

=== Semifinals ===
19 June 1998

Boxscore

Iceland	45–65	Austria

19 June 1998

Boxscore

Cyprus	62–71	Luxembourg

=== 3rd place match ===
20 June 1998

Boxscore

Iceland	51–53	Cyprus

=== Final ===
20 June 1998

Boxscore

Austria	85–45	Luxembourg

== Final standings ==
Rank	Team
1st place, gold medalist(s)	Austria
2nd place, silver medalist(s)	Luxembourg
3rd place, bronze medalist(s)	Cyprus
4	Iceland
5	Malta
6	Gibraltar
7	Armenia
8	Wales
