= 2014 FIBA Women's European Championship for Small Countries =

Tournament details
- Host country: Austria
- City: Sankt Pölten
- Dates: 14–19 July 2014
- Teams: 7 (from 1 confederation)
- Venue: 1 (in 1 host city)

Final positions
- Champions: Austria (5th title)
- Runners-up: Iceland
- Third place: Malta

Official website
- www.fibaeurope.com

The 2014 FIBA Women's European Championship for Small Countries was the 13th edition of this competition. The tournament took place in Sankt Pölten, Austria, from 14 to 19 July 2014. Austria women's national basketball team won the tournament for the fifth time.

== Participating teams ==
- Austria
- Azerbaijan
- Gibraltar
- Iceland
- Malta
- Scotland
- Wales

== First round ==
In the first round, the teams were drawn into two groups. The first two teams from each group advance to the semifinals, the other teams will play in the 5th–7th place classification.

=== Group A ===
Pos	Team	Pld	W	L	PF	PA	PD	Pts	Qualification
1	Iceland	2	2	0	203	76	+127	4	Semifinals
2	Malta	2	1	1	139	108	+31	3	Semifinals
3	Gibraltar	2	0	2	55	213	−158	2	5th–7th place classification

Source: FIBA Archive

14 July 2014

Boxscore

Malta	46–83	Iceland

15 July 2014

Boxscore

Iceland	120–30	Gibraltar

16 July 2014

Boxscore

Gibraltar	25–93	Malta

=== Group B ===
Pos	Team	Pld	W	L	PF	PA	PD	Pts	Qualification
1	Austria	3	3	0	246	98	+148	6	Semifinals
2	Scotland	3	2	1	197	169	+28	5	Semifinals
3	Wales	3	1	2	136	235	−99	4	5th–7th place classification
4	Azerbaijan	3	0	3	152	229	−77	3	5th–7th place classification

Source: FIBA Archive

14 July 2014

Boxscore

Scotland	66–56	Azerbaijan

14 July 2014

Boxscore

Austria	82–24	Wales

15 July 2014

Boxscore

Wales	43–86	Scotland

15 July 2014

Boxscore

Azerbaijan	29–94	Austria

16 July 2014

Boxscore

Scotland	45–70	Austria

16 July 2014

Boxscore

Wales	69–67	Azerbaijan

== 5th–7th place classification ==
=== Group C ===
Pos	Team	Pld	W	L	PF	PA	PD	Pts
5	Wales	2	2	0	126	108	+18	4
6	Azerbaijan	2	1	1	136	119	+17	3
7	Gibraltar	2	0	2	91	126	−35	2

Source: FIBA Archive

18 July 2014

Boxscore

Azerbaijan	69–50	Gibraltar

19 July 2014

Boxscore

Gibraltar	41–57	Wales

== Playoffs ==
Semifinals
A1	Iceland	85
B2	Scotland	59
B1	Austria	58
A2	Malta	46

Final
A1	Iceland	81
B1	Austria	87
3rd place match
B2	Scotland	59
A2	Malta	66

=== Semifinals ===
18 July 2014

Boxscore

Iceland	85–59	Scotland

18 July 2014

Boxscore

Austria	58–46	Malta

=== 3rd place match ===
19 July 2014

Boxscore

Scotland	59–66	Malta

=== Final ===
19 July 2014

Boxscore

Iceland	81–87	Austria

== Final standings ==
Rank	Team
1st place, gold medalist(s)	Austria
2nd place, silver medalist(s)	Iceland
3rd place, bronze medalist(s)	Malta
4	Scotland
5	Wales
6	Azerbaijan
7	Gibraltar
