= FIBA EuroBasket Women 2008 Division C =

Women's European basketball championship

Tournament details
- Host country: Luxembourg
- City: Luxembourg City
- Dates: 7–12 July 2008
- Teams: 8 (from 1 confederation)
- Venue(s): 1 (in 1 host city)

Final positions
- Champions: Malta (1st title)
- Runners-up: Albania
- Third place: Luxembourg

The FIBA EuroBasket Women 2008 Division C was the tenth edition of the lowest tier of the women's European basketball championship, which is today known as FIBA Women's European Championship for Small Countries. The tournament took place in Luxembourg City, Luxembourg, from 7 to 12 July 2008. Malta women's national basketball team won the tournament for the first time.

== Participating teams ==
- Albania
- Andorra
- Azerbaijan
- Gibraltar
- Luxembourg
- Malta
- Scotland
- Wales

== First round ==
In the first round, the teams were drawn into two groups of four. The first two teams from each group advance to the semifinals, the other teams will play in the 5th–8th place playoffs.

=== Group A ===
| Pos | Team | Pld | W | L | PF | PA | PD | Pts | Qualification |
|---|---|---|---|---|---|---|---|---|---|
| 1 | Luxembourg | 3 | 3 | 0 | 252 | 79 | +173 | 6 | Semifinals |
| 2 | Andorra | 3 | 2 | 1 | 148 | 138 | +10 | 5 | Semifinals |
| 3 | Azerbaijan | 3 | 1 | 2 | 130 | 210 | −80 | 4 | 5th–8th place playoffs |
| 4 | Gibraltar | 3 | 0 | 3 | 114 | 217 | −103 | 3 | 5th–8th place playoffs |

Source: FIBA Archive

7 July 2008

Boxscore

| Luxembourg | 93–27 | Gibraltar |

7 July 2008

Boxscore

| Azerbaijan | 35–67 | Andorra |

8 July 2008

Boxscore

| Andorra | 28–58 | Luxembourg |

8 July 2008

Boxscore

| Gibraltar | 42–71 | Azerbaijan |

9 July 2008

Boxscore

| Luxembourg | 101–24 | Azerbaijan |

9 July 2008

Boxscore

| Andorra | 53–45 | Gibraltar |

=== Group B ===
| Pos | Team | Pld | W | L | PF | PA | PD | Pts | Qualification |
|---|---|---|---|---|---|---|---|---|---|
| 1 | Malta | 3 | 3 | 0 | 215 | 146 | +69 | 6 | Semifinals |
| 2 | Albania | 3 | 2 | 1 | 204 | 196 | +8 | 5 | Semifinals |
| 3 | Scotland | 3 | 1 | 2 | 179 | 191 | −12 | 4 | 5th–8th place playoffs |
| 4 | Wales | 3 | 0 | 3 | 136 | 201 | −65 | 3 | 5th–8th place playoffs |

Source: FIBA Archive

7 July 2008

Boxscore

| Scotland | 62–46 | Wales |

7 July 2008

Boxscore

| Albania | 55–80 | Malta |

8 July 2008

Boxscore

| Malta | 75–50 | Scotland |

8 July 2008

Boxscore

| Wales | 49–79 | Albania |

9 July 2008

Boxscore

| Scotland | 67–70 | Albania |

9 July 2008

Boxscore

| Malta | 60–41 | Wales |

== 5th–8th place playoffs ==
5th–8th place semifinals
A3 | Azerbaijan | 31
B4 | Wales | 49
B3 | Scotland | 108
A4 | Gibraltar | 40

5th place match
B4 | Wales | 51
B3 | Scotland | 64
7th place match
A3 | Azerbaijan | 54
A4 | Gibraltar | 39

=== 5th–8th place semifinals ===
11 July 2008

Boxscore

| Azerbaijan | 31–49 | Wales |

11 July 2008

Boxscore

| Scotland | 108–40 | Gibraltar |

=== 7th place match ===
12 July 2008

Boxscore

| Azerbaijan | 54–39 | Gibraltar |

=== 5th place match ===
12 July 2008

Boxscore

| Wales | 51–64 | Scotland |

== Championship playoffs ==
Semifinals
A1 | Luxembourg | 61
B2 | Albania | 73
B1 | Malta | 58
A2 | Andorra | 37

Finals
B2 | Albania | 61
B1 | Malta | 81
3rd place match
A1 | Luxembourg | 55
A2 | Andorra | 45

=== Semifinals ===
11 July 2008

Boxscore

| Luxembourg | 61–73 | Albania |

11 July 2008

Boxscore

| Malta | 58–37 | Andorra |

=== 3rd place match ===
12 July 2008

Boxscore

| Luxembourg | 55–45 | Andorra |

=== Final ===
12 July 2008

Boxscore

| Albania | 61–81 | Malta |

== Final standings ==
| Rank | Team |
|---|---|
| 1st place, gold medalist(s) | Malta |
| 2nd place, silver medalist(s) | Albania |
| 3rd place, bronze medalist(s) | Luxembourg |
| 4 | Andorra |
| 5 | Scotland |
| 6 | Wales |
| 7 | Azerbaijan |
| 8 | Gibraltar |
