= 1993 European Promotion Cup for Women =

Tournament details
- Host country: Cyprus
- City: Nicosia
- Dates: 14–18 December 1993
- Teams: 8 (from 1 confederation)
- Venue: 1 (in 1 host city)

Final positions
- Champions: Austria (2nd title)
- Runners-up: Ireland
- Third place: Cyprus

The 1993 European Promotion Cup for Women was the third edition of the basketball European Promotion Cup for Women, today known as FIBA Women's European Championship for Small Countries. The tournament took place in Nicosia, Cyprus, from 14 to 18 December 1993. Austria women's national basketball team won the tournament for the second time.

== Participating teams ==
- Austria
- Cyprus
- Gibraltar
- Iceland
- Ireland
- Luxembourg
- Switzerland
- Wales

== First round ==
In the first round, the teams were drawn into two groups of four. The first two teams from each group advance to the semifinals, the other teams will play in the 5th–8th place playoffs.

=== Group A ===
Pos	Team	Pld	W	L	PF	PA	PD	Pts	Qualification
1	Ireland	3	3	0	236	163	+73	6	Semifinals
2	Iceland	3	2	1	176	174	+2	5	Semifinals
3	Switzerland	3	1	2	198	211	−13	4	5th–8th place playoffs
4	Wales	3	0	3	148	210	−62	3	5th–8th place playoffs

Source: FIBA Archive

14 December 1993

Boxscore

Switzerland	73–50	Wales

14 December 1993

Boxscore

Ireland	66–48	Iceland

15 December 1993

Boxscore

Wales	51–76	Ireland

15 December 1993

Boxscore

Switzerland	61–67	Iceland

16 December 1993

Boxscore

Iceland	61–47	Wales

16 December 1993

Boxscore

Switzerland	64–94	Ireland

=== Group B ===
Pos	Team	Pld	W	L	PF	PA	PD	Pts	Qualification
1	Austria	3	3	0	286	134	+152	6	Semifinals
2	Cyprus	3	2	1	157	180	−23	5	Semifinals
3	Luxembourg	3	1	2	188	162	+26	4	5th–8th place playoffs
4	Gibraltar	3	0	3	133	288	−155	3	5th–8th place playoffs

Source: FIBA Archive

14 December 1993

Boxscore

Austria	128–49	Gibraltar

14 December 1993

Boxscore

Luxembourg	48–52	Cyprus

15 December 1993

Boxscore

Gibraltar	33–87	Luxembourg

15 December 1993

Boxscore

Austria	81–32	Cyprus

16 December 1993

Boxscore

Austria	77–53	Luxembourg

16 December 1993

Boxscore

Cyprus	73–51	Gibraltar

== 5th–8th place playoffs ==
5th–8th place semifinals
A4	Wales	57
B3	Luxembourg	74
B4	Gibraltar	41
A3	Switzerland	76

5th place match
B3	Luxembourg	65
A3	Switzerland	54
7th place match
A4	Wales	87
B4	Gibraltar	47

=== 5th–8th place semifinals ===
17 December 1993

Boxscore

Wales	57–74	Luxembourg

17 December 1993

Boxscore

Gibraltar	41–76	Switzerland

=== 7th place match ===
18 December 1993

Boxscore

Wales	87–47	Gibraltar

=== 5th place match ===
18 December 1993

Boxscore

Luxembourg	65–54	Switzerland

== Championship playoffs ==
Semifinals
A2	Iceland	50
B1	Austria	87
B2	Cyprus	42
A1	Ireland	82

Finals
B1	Austria	68
A1	Ireland	54
3rd place match
A2	Iceland	51
B2	Cyprus	57

=== Semifinals ===
17 December 1993

Boxscore

Iceland	50–87	Austria

17 December 1993

Boxscore

Cyprus	42–82	Ireland

=== 3rd place match ===
18 December 1993

Boxscore

Iceland	51–57	Cyprus

=== Final ===
18 December 1993

Boxscore

Austria	68–54	Ireland

== Final standings ==
Rank	Team
1st place, gold medalist(s)	Austria
2nd place, silver medalist(s)	Ireland
3rd place, bronze medalist(s)	Cyprus
4	Iceland
5	Luxembourg
6	Switzerland
7	Wales
8	Gibraltar
