= 2002 European Promotion Cup for Women =

2002 European women's basketball tournament

Tournament details
- Host country: Andorra
- City: Andorra la Vella
- Dates: 18–22 June 2002
- Teams: 7 (from 1 confederation)
- Venue: 1 (in 1 host city)

Final positions
- Champions: Albania (1st title)
- Runners-up: Iceland
- Third place: Cyprus

The 2002 European Promotion Cup for Women was the seventh edition of the basketball European Promotion Cup for Women, today known as FIBA Women's European Championship for Small Countries. The tournament took place in Andorra la Vella, Andorra, from 18 to 22 June 2002. Albania women's national basketball team won the tournament for the first time.

== Participating teams ==
- Albania
- Andorra
- Cyprus
- Gibraltar
- Iceland
- Luxembourg
- Malta

== First round ==
In the first round, the teams were drawn into two groups. The first two teams from each group advance to the semifinals, the other teams will play in the 5th–7th place classification.

=== Group A ===
Pos	Team	Pld	W	L	PF	PA	PD	Pts	Qualification
1	Albania	2	2	0	183	121	+62	4	Semifinals
2	Iceland	2	1	1	146	132	+14	3	Semifinals
3	Malta	2	0	2	99	175	−76	2	5th–7th place classification

Source: FIBA Archive

18 June 2002

Boxscore

Albania	100–50	Malta

19 June 2002

Boxscore

Malta	49–75	Iceland

20 June 2002

Boxscore

Iceland	71–83	Albania

=== Group B ===
Pos	Team	Pld	W	L	PF	PA	PD	Pts	Qualification
1	Cyprus	3	3	0	206	131	+75	6	Semifinals
2	Luxembourg	3	2	1	236	157	+79	5	Semifinals
3	Andorra	3	1	2	182	156	+26	4	5th–7th place classification
4	Gibraltar	3	0	3	95	275	−180	3	5th–7th place classification

Source: FIBA Archive

18 June 2002

Boxscore

Cyprus	64–56	Luxembourg

18 June 2002

Boxscore

Andorra	84–25	Gibraltar

19 June 2002

Boxscore

Gibraltar	35–84	Cyprus

19 June 2002

Boxscore

Luxembourg	73–58	Andorra

20 June 2002

Boxscore

Luxembourg	107–35	Gibraltar

20 June 2002

Boxscore

Andorra	40–58	Cyprus

== 5th–7th place classification ==
=== Group C ===
Pos	Team	Pld	W	L	PF	PA	PD	Pts
5	Andorra	2	2	0	149	82	+67	4
6	Malta	2	1	1	142	122	+20	3
7	Gibraltar	2	0	2	82	169	−87	2

Source: FIBA Archive

21 June 2002

Boxscore

Gibraltar	57–85	Malta

22 June 2002

Boxscore

Malta	57–65	Andorra

== Playoffs ==
Semifinals
A2	Iceland	56
B1	Cyprus	51
B2	Luxembourg	66
A1	Albania	84

Finals
A2	Iceland	79
A1	Albania	84
3rd place match
B1	Cyprus	71
B2	Luxembourg	61

=== Semifinals ===
21 June 2002

Boxscore

Iceland	56–51	Cyprus

21 June 2002

Boxscore

Luxembourg	66–84	Albania

=== 3rd place match ===
22 June 2002

Boxscore

Cyprus	71–61	Luxembourg

=== Final ===
22 June 2002

Boxscore

Iceland	79–84	Albania

== Final standings ==
Rank	Team
1st place, gold medalist(s)	Albania
2nd place, silver medalist(s)	Iceland
3rd place, bronze medalist(s)	Cyprus
4	Luxembourg
5	Andorra
6	Malta
7	Gibraltar
