= Kosovo women's national basketball team =

Kosovo's national basketball team

Kosovo
- FIBA ranking: 85 (18 March 2026)
- Joined FIBA: 2015
- FIBA zone: FIBA Europe
- National federation: Federata e Basketbollit të Kosovës (FBK)
- Coach: Fidan Shatri
- Nickname: Dardanet (Dardanians)

Olympic Games
- Appearances: None

World Cup
- Appearances: None

EuroBasket
- Appearances: None

European Championship for Small Countries
- Appearances: 1
- Medals: Bronze: (2021)
Home	Away

First international
- Cyprus 68–70 Kosovo (Nicosia, Cyprus; 20 July 2021)

Biggest win
- Kosovo 70–60 Malta (Nicosia, Cyprus; 25 July 2021)

Biggest defeat
- Ireland 86–72 Kosovo (Nicosia, Cyprus; 24 July 2021) Records of first international and biggest win/defeat are for competitive matches only

The Kosovo women's national basketball team (Albanian: Kombëtarja e basketbollit të femrave të Kosovës, Serbian: Женска кошаркашкa репрезентација Косова, romanized: Ženska košarkaška reprezentacija Kosova) represents Kosovo in international women's basketball. It is controlled by the Basketball Federation of Kosovo, the governing body for basketball in Kosovo.

== Competitive record ==
=== European Championship for Small Countries ===
European Championship for Small Countries record
Year	Round	Pos	Pld	W	L	Squad
(Luxembourg) 1989	Part of SFR Yugoslavia					
(Gibraltar) 1991 to (Austria) 1998	Part of FR Yugoslavia					
(North Macedonia) 2000 to (Republic of Ireland) 2018	Team did not exist					
(Cyprus) 2021	Third place	3rd	3	1	2	Squad
Total	Third place	1/1	3	1	2	—

== Team ==
=== Current roster ===
The following is the Kosovo roster were called up for the 2021 FIBA Women's European Championship for Small Countries.

Kosovo women's national basketball team roster
Players
Coaches

Pos.	No.	Name	Age – Date of birth	Height	Club	Ctr.
SF	1	Era Shatri	23 – 18 June 1998	1.82 m (6 ft 0 in)	Prishtina	(Kosovo)
G	2	Alexis Tolefree	22 – 12 August 1998	1.73 m (5 ft 8 in)	Prishtina	(Kosovo)
PG	4	Enisa Kamerolli	18 – 6 July 2003	1.60 m (5 ft 3 in)	Prishtina	(Kosovo)
SG	5	Ulpiana Emra	25 – 29 May 1996	1.80 m (5 ft 11 in)	Bashkimi	(Kosovo)
PG	6	Irma Konjusha	27 – 14 August 1993	1.71 m (5 ft 7 in)	Bashkimi	(Kosovo)
C	7	Aulona Muhadri	23 – 24 April 1998	1.82 m (6 ft 0 in)	Prishtina	(Kosovo)
SF	9	Valbona Bytyqi-Osmanaj	33 – 7 December 1987	1.82 m (6 ft 0 in)	Penza	(Kosovo)
PG	10	Marigona Rushiti	27 – 2 February 1994	1.74 m (5 ft 9 in)	Bashkimi Prizren	(Kosovo)
C	11	Saranda Daci	28 – 23 February 1993	1.90 m (6 ft 3 in)	Bashkimi Prizren	(Kosovo)
PG	12	Arbnore Përquku (C)	33 – 16 March 1988	1.76 m (5 ft 9 in)	Penza	(Kosovo)
PG	21	Astera Tuhina	16 – 21 October 2004	1.55 m (5 ft 1 in)	Promete	(Spain)
PG	44	Diedona Halitaj	22 – 10 November 1998	1.66 m (5 ft 5 in)	Penza	(Kosovo)

Head coach

- (Kosovo) Fidan Shatri

Assistant coach(es)

- (Kosovo) Lorik Kllokoqi
- (Kosovo) Kemajl Muja

Legend

- (C) – Team captain
- Age – describes age,
  on 18 July 2021
- Club – describes last
  club before the competition
