= 1989 European Promotion Cup for Women =

Basketball competition in Europe

Tournament details
- Host country: Luxembourg
- City: Oberanven
- Dates: 13–17 December 1989
- Teams: 8 (from 1 confederation)
- Venue: 1 (in 1 host city)

Final positions
- Champions: Austria (1st title)
- Runners-up: Ireland
- Third place: Luxembourg

The 1989 European Promotion Cup for Women was the first edition of the basketball European Promotion Cup for Women, today known as FIBA Women's European Championship for Small Countries. The tournament took place in Oberanven, Luxembourg, from 13 to 17 December 1989. Austria women's national basketball team won the tournament for the first time.

== Participating teams ==
- Austria
- Cyprus
- Gibraltar
- Iceland
- Ireland
- Luxembourg
- Malta
- Wales

== First round ==
In the first round, the teams were drawn into two groups of four. The first two teams from each group advance to the semifinals, the other teams will play in the 5th–8th place playoffs.

=== Group A ===
Pos	Team	Pld	W	L	PF	PA	PD	Pts	Qualification
1	Austria	3	3	0	254	134	+120	6	Semifinals
2	Iceland	3	2	1	195	212	−17	5	Semifinals
3	Wales	3	1	2	184	198	−14	4	5th–8th place playoffs
4	Cyprus	3	0	3	145	234	−89	3	5th–8th place playoffs

Source: FIBA Archive

13 December 1989

Boxscore

Iceland	73–56	Cyprus

13 December 1989

Boxscore

Austria	78–43	Wales

14 December 1989

Boxscore

Wales	65–70	Iceland

14 December 1989

Boxscore

Cyprus	39–85	Austria

15 December 1989

Boxscore

Cyprus	50–76	Wales

15 December 1989

Boxscore

Austria	91–52	Iceland

=== Group B ===
Pos	Team	Pld	W	L	PF	PA	PD	Pts	Qualification
1	Ireland	3	3	0	305	114	+191	6	Semifinals
2	Luxembourg	3	2	1	290	146	+144	5	Semifinals
3	Malta	3	1	2	125	303	−178	4	5th–8th place playoffs
4	Gibraltar	3	0	3	97	254	−157	3	5th–8th place playoffs

Source: FIBA Archive

13 December 1989

Boxscore

Ireland	104–17	Gibraltar

13 December 1989

Boxscore

Luxembourg	129–39	Malta

14 December 1989

Boxscore

Malta	39–129	Ireland

14 December 1989

Boxscore

Gibraltar	35–103	Luxembourg

15 December 1989

Boxscore

Malta	47–45	Gibraltar

15 December 1989

Boxscore

Ireland	72–58	Luxembourg

== 5th–8th place playoffs ==
5th–8th place semifinals
A3	Wales	96
B4	Gibraltar	40
B3	Malta	46
A4	Cyprus	52

5th place match
A3	Wales	86
A4	Cyprus	50
7th place match
B4	Gibraltar	49
B3	Malta	50

=== 5th–8th place semifinals ===
16 December 1989

Boxscore

Wales	96–40	Gibraltar

16 December 1989

Boxscore

Malta	46–52	Cyprus

=== 7th place match ===
17 December 1989

Boxscore

Gibraltar	49–50	Malta

=== 5th place match ===
17 December 1989

Boxscore

Wales	86–50	Cyprus

== Championship playoffs ==
Semifinals
A1	Austria	64
B2	Luxembourg	52
B1	Ireland	74
A2	Iceland	55

Finals
A1	Austria	63
B1	Ireland	57
3rd place match
B2	Luxembourg	73
A2	Iceland	52

=== Semifinals ===
16 December 1989

Boxscore

Austria	64–52	Luxembourg

16 December 1989

Boxscore

Ireland	74–55	Iceland

=== 3rd place match ===
17 December 1989

Boxscore

Luxembourg	73–52	Iceland

=== Final ===
17 December 1989

Boxscore

Austria	63–57	Ireland

== Final standings ==
Rank	Team
1st place, gold medalist(s)	Austria
2nd place, silver medalist(s)	Ireland
3rd place, bronze medalist(s)	Luxembourg
4	Iceland
5	Wales
6	Cyprus
7	Malta
8	Gibraltar
