= 2022 FIBA Women's European Championship for Small Countries =

Tournament details
- Host country: Cyprus
- City: Nicosia
- Dates: 28 June – 3 July
- Teams: 5 (from 1 confederation)
- Venue: 1 (in 1 host city)

Final positions
- Champions: Cyprus (1st title)
- Runners-up: Norway
- Third place: Malta

Official website
- www.fiba.basketball

The 2022 FIBA Women's European Championship for Small Countries was the 17th edition of this competition. The tournament took place in Nicosia, Cyprus, from 28 June to 3 July 2022. Luxembourg were the defending champions; but they didn't participate in this edition.

== Participating teams ==
- Andorra
- Cyprus
- Kosovo
- Malta
- Norway

== Final standings ==
Pos	Team	Pld	W	L	PF	PA	PD	Pts
1st place, gold medalist(s)	Cyprus (H)	4	4	0	332	247	+85	8
2nd place, silver medalist(s)	Norway	4	3	1	302	219	+83	7
3rd place, bronze medalist(s)	Malta	4	2	2	259	243	+16	6
4	Kosovo	4	1	3	259	293	−34	5
5	Andorra	4	0	4	184	334	−150	4

Source: FIBA
(H) Hosts

== Results ==
All times are local (UTC+3).

28 June 2022
16:00

Boxscore

Norway	95–36	Andorra

Eleftheria Sports Arena, Nicosia

28 June 2022
18:30

Boxscore

Kosovo	61–68	Malta

Eleftheria Sports Arena, Nicosia

29 June 2022
16:00

Boxscore

Andorra	56–77	Kosovo

Eleftheria Sports Arena, Nicosia

29 June 2022
18:30

Boxscore

Cyprus	81–62	Norway

Eleftheria Sports Arena, Nicosia

30 June 2022
14:00

Boxscore

Malta	76–41	Andorra

Eleftheria Sports Arena, Nicosia

30 June 2022
16:30

Boxscore

Kosovo	67–88	Cyprus

Eleftheria Sports Arena, Nicosia

2 July 2022
16:00

Boxscore

Norway	81–54	Kosovo

Eleftheria Sports Arena, Nicosia

2 July 2022
18:30

Boxscore

Cyprus	77–67	Malta

Eleftheria Sports Arena, Nicosia

3 July 2022
16:00

Boxscore

Malta	48–64	Norway

Eleftheria Sports Arena, Nicosia

3 July 2022
18:30

Boxscore

Andorra	51–86	Cyprus

Eleftheria Sports Arena, Nicosia
