= 1991 European Promotion Cup for Women =

Tournament details
- Host country: Gibraltar
- Dates: 10–14 December 1991
- Teams: 8 (from 1 confederation)
- Venue: 1 (in 1 host city)

Final positions
- Champions: Turkey (1st title)
- Runners-up: Ireland
- Third place: Austria

The 1991 European Promotion Cup for Women was the second edition of the basketball European Promotion Cup for Women, today known as FIBA Women's European Championship for Small Countries. The tournament took place in Gibraltar from 10 to 14 December 1991. Turkey women's national basketball team won the tournament for the first time.

== Participating teams ==
- Austria
- Cyprus
- Gibraltar
- Iceland
- Ireland
- Luxembourg
- Turkey
- Wales

== First round ==
In the first round, the teams were drawn into two groups of four. The first two teams from each group advance to the semifinals, the other teams will play in the 5th–8th place playoffs.

=== Group A ===
Pos	Team	Pld	W	L	PF	PA	PD	Pts	Qualification
1	Turkey	3	3	0	275	184	+91	6	Semifinals
2	Austria	3	2	1	215	166	+49	5	Semifinals
3	Iceland	3	1	2	161	230	−69	4	5th–8th place playoffs
4	Cyprus	3	0	3	170	241	−71	3	5th–8th place playoffs

Source: FIBA Archive

10 December 1991

Boxscore

Iceland	59–52	Cyprus

10 December 1991

Boxscore

Austria	61–69	Turkey

11 December 1991

Boxscore

Cyprus	46–72	Austria

11 December 1991

Boxscore

Turkey	96–51	Iceland

12 December 1991

Boxscore

Cyprus	72–110	Turkey

12 December 1991

Boxscore

Austria	82–51	Iceland

=== Group B ===
Pos	Team	Pld	W	L	PF	PA	PD	Pts	Qualification
1	Ireland	3	3	0	310	170	+140	6	Semifinals
2	Luxembourg	3	2	1	267	175	+92	5	Semifinals
3	Wales	3	1	2	145	276	−131	4	5th–8th place playoffs
4	Gibraltar	3	0	3	168	269	−101	3	5th–8th place playoffs

Source: FIBA Archive

10 December 1991

Boxscore

Luxembourg	87–31	Wales

10 December 1991

Boxscore

Ireland	92–53	Gibraltar

11 December 1991

Boxscore

Wales	45–133	Ireland

11 December 1991

Boxscore

Gibraltar	59–108	Luxembourg

12 December 1991

Boxscore

Ireland	85–72	Luxembourg

12 December 1991

Boxscore

Wales	69–56	Gibraltar

== 5th–8th place playoffs ==
5th–8th place semifinals
A4	Cyprus	69
B3	Wales	49
B4	Gibraltar	49
A3	Iceland	76

5th place match
A4	Cyprus	46
A3	Iceland	63
7th place match
B3	Wales	47
B4	Gibraltar	55

=== 5th–8th place semifinals ===
13 December 1991

Boxscore

Cyprus	69–49	Wales

13 December 1991

Boxscore

Gibraltar	49–76	Iceland

=== 7th place match ===
14 December 1991

Boxscore

Wales	47–55	Gibraltar

=== 5th place match ===
14 December 1991

Boxscore

Cyprus	46–63	Iceland

== Championship playoffs ==
Semifinals
A2	Austria	72
B1	Ireland	80
B2	Luxembourg	58
A1	Turkey	80

Finals
B1	Ireland	65
A1	Turkey	95
3rd place match
A2	Austria	67
B2	Luxembourg	58

=== Semifinals ===
13 December 1991

Boxscore

Austria	72–80	Ireland

13 December 1991

Boxscore

Luxembourg	58–80	Turkey

=== 3rd place match ===
14 December 1991

Boxscore

Austria	67–58	Luxembourg

=== Final ===
14 December 1991

Boxscore

Ireland	65–95	Turkey

== Final standings ==
Rank	Team
1st place, gold medalist(s)	Turkey
2nd place, silver medalist(s)	Ireland
3rd place, bronze medalist(s)	Austria
4	Luxembourg
5	Iceland
6	Cyprus
7	Gibraltar
8	Wales
