= Iceland women's national basketball team =

Iceland
- FIBA ranking: 63 ▲3 (18 March 2026)
- Joined FIBA: 1959
- FIBA zone: FIBA Europe
- National federation: KKÍ
- Coach: Pekka Salminen
- Nickname: Stelpurnar okkar (Our Girls)

Olympic Games
- Appearances: None

World Cup
- Appearances: None

EuroBasket
- Appearances: None
| Home | Away |

First international
- Iceland 15–112 Sweden (Bærum, Norway; 6 April 1973)

Biggest win
- Iceland 120–30 Gibraltar (St. Pölten, Austria; 15 July 2014)

Biggest defeat
- Iceland 15–134 Sweden (Uppsala, Sweden; 24 April 1986)
Medal record
| Event | 1st | 2nd | 3rd |
|---|---|---|---|
| Championship for Small Countries | 2 | 2 | 0 |
| Games of the Small States | 0 | 5 | 1 |
| Total | 2 | 7 | 1 |

The Iceland women's national basketball team represents Iceland in international women's basketball tournaments. They are controlled by the Icelandic Basketball Association.

== Competitive record ==
=== Championship for Small Countries ===
Championship for Small Countries
| Year | Position | Pld | W | L |
|---|---|---|---|---|
| (Luxembourg) 1989 | Fourth Place | 5 | 2 | 3 |
| (Gibraltar) 1991 | 5th | 5 | 3 | 2 |
| (Cyprus) 1993 | Fourth Place | 5 | 2 | 3 |
| (Malta) 1996 | Champion | 5 | 5 | 0 |
| (Austria) 1998 | Fourth Place | 5 | 2 | 3 |
| (North Macedonia) 2000 | Did not participate | | | |
| (Andorra) 2002 | Runners-up | 4 | 2 | 2 |
| (Andorra) 2004 | Champion | 5 | 4 | 1 |
| (Malta) 2006 | Did not participate | | | |
| (Luxembourg) 2008 | Did not participate | | | |
| (Armenia) 2010 | Did not participate | | | |
| (North Macedonia) 2012 | Did not participate | | | |
| (Austria) 2014 | Runner-up | 4 | 3 | 1 |
| (Gibraltar) 2016 | Did not participate | | | |

=== Games of the Small States ===
Games of the Small States of Europe
| Year | Position | Pld | W | L |
|---|---|---|---|---|
| (Cyprus) 1989 | Runners-up | - | - | - |
| (Andorra) 1991 | Third Place | 3 | 1 | 2 |
| (Malta) 1993 | Runners-up | 3 | 2 | 1 |
| (Luxembourg) 1995 | Runners-up | 3 | 2 | 1 |
| (Iceland) 1997 | Winners | 3 | 3 | 0 |
| (Malta) 2003 | Third Place | 3 | 1 | 2 |
| (Andorra) 2005 | Runners-up | 3 | 2 | 1 |
| (Cyprus) 2009 | Runners-up | 3 | 2 | 1 |
| (Luxembourg) 2013 | Runners-up | 3 | 2 | 1 |
| (Iceland) 2015 | Runners-up | 3 | 2 | 1 |
| (San Marino) 2017 | Runners-up | 3 | 2 | 1 |
| (Montenegro) 2019 | Runners-up | 5 | 4 | 1 |

== Team ==
=== Individual records ===
==== Players with the most caps (games played) ====
- Players in **bold**, are players that are still active.

| Rank | Player | Years | Caps |
|---|---|---|---|
| 1. | Helena Sverrisdóttir | 2002-2024 | 81 |
| 2. | Hildur Sigurðardóttir | 1999-2014 | 79 |
| 3. | Birna Valgarðsdóttir | 1995-2009 | 76 |
| 4. | Signý Hermannsdóttir | 1999-2009 | 61 |
| 5. | Anna María Sveinsdóttir | 1986-2004 | 60 |
| 6. | Sigrún Sjöfn Ámundadóttir | 2007-2023 | 57 |
| 7. | Guðbjörg Norðfjörð | 1990-2002 | 53 |
| 8. | Helga Þorvaldsdóttir | 1993-2005 | 53 |
| 9. | Alda Leif Jónsdóttir | 1996-2005 | 52 |
| 10. | Erla Þorsteinsdóttir | 1995-2004 | 48 |

Correct as of 4 January 2026
