= 2018 FIBA Women's European Championship for Small Countries =

Tournament details
- Host country: Ireland
- City: Cork
- Dates: 26 June – 1 July 2018
- Teams: 8 (from 1 confederation)
- Venue(s): 1 (in 1 host city)

Final positions
- Champions: Denmark (1st title)
- Runners-up: Luxembourg
- Third place: Malta

Official website
- www.fiba.basketball

The 2018 FIBA Women's European Championship for Small Countries was the 15th edition of this competition. The tournament took place in Cork, Ireland, from 26 June to 1 July 2018. Denmark women's national basketball team won the tournament for the first time.

== Participating teams ==
- Cyprus
- Denmark
- Gibraltar
- Ireland
- Luxembourg
- Malta
- Moldova
- Norway

== Group phase ==
In this round, the teams were drawn into two groups of four. The first two teams from each group advance to the semifinals, the other teams will play in the 5th–8th place playoffs.

=== Group A ===
Pos	Team	Pld	W	L	PF	PA	PD	Pts	Qualification
1	Denmark	3	3	0	358	126	+232	6	Semifinals
2	Malta	3	2	1	251	160	+91	5	Semifinals
3	Gibraltar	3	1	2	135	251	−116	4	5th–8th place playoffs
4	Moldova	3	0	3	131	338	−207	3	5th–8th place playoffs

Source: FIBA

26 June 2018

Boxscore

Malta	58–96	Denmark

26 June 2018

Boxscore

Gibraltar	70–64	Moldova

27 June 2018

Boxscore

Denmark	116–33	Gibraltar

27 June 2018

Boxscore

Moldova	32–122	Malta

28 June 2018

Boxscore

Moldova	35–146	Denmark

28 June 2018

Boxscore

Malta	71–32	Gibraltar

=== Group B ===
Pos	Team	Pld	W	L	PF	PA	PD	Pts	Qualification
1	Luxembourg	3	3	0	207	135	+72	6	Semifinals
2	Norway	3	2	1	168	182	−14	5	Semifinals
3	Ireland	3	1	2	182	197	−15	4	5th–8th place playoffs
4	Cyprus	3	0	3	157	200	−43	3	5th–8th place playoffs

Source: FIBA

26 June 2018

Boxscore

Luxembourg	71–49	Cyprus

26 June 2018

Boxscore

Norway	73–62	Ireland

27 June 2018

Boxscore

Cyprus	54–56	Norway

27 June 2018

Boxscore

Ireland	47–70	Luxembourg

28 June 2018

Boxscore

Luxembourg	66–39	Norway

28 June 2018

Boxscore

Ireland	73–54	Cyprus

== 5th–8th place playoffs ==
5th–8th place semifinals
A3	Gibraltar	47
B4	Cyprus	100
B3	Ireland	102
A4	Moldova	28

5th place match
B4	Cyprus	82
B3	Ireland	75
7th place match
A3	Gibraltar	58
A4	Moldova	68

=== 5th–8th place semifinals ===
30 June 2018

Boxscore

Gibraltar	47–100	Cyprus

30 June 2018

Boxscore

Ireland	102–28	Moldova

=== 7th place match ===
1 July 2018

Boxscore

Gibraltar	58–68	Moldova

=== 5th place match ===
1 July 2018

Boxscore

Cyprus	82–75	Ireland

== Championship playoffs ==
Semifinals
A1	Denmark	77
B2	Norway	42
B1	Luxembourg	62
A2	Malta	47

Finals
A1	Denmark	93
B1	Luxembourg	59
3rd place match
B2	Norway	59
A2	Malta	67

=== Semifinals ===
30 June 2018

Boxscore

Denmark	77–42	Norway

30 June 2018

Boxscore

Luxembourg	62–47	Malta

=== 3rd place match ===
1 July 2018

Boxscore

Norway	59–67	Malta

=== Final ===
1 July 2018

Boxscore

Denmark	93–59	Luxembourg

== Final standings ==
Rank	Team
1st place, gold medalist(s)	Denmark
2nd place, silver medalist(s)	Luxembourg
3rd place, bronze medalist(s)	Malta
4	Norway
5	Cyprus
6	Ireland
7	Moldova
8	Gibraltar
