= Malta Basketball Association =

- Sport: Basketball
- Jurisdiction: Malta
- Abbreviation: MBA
- Founded: 1964
- Affiliation: FIBA
- Affiliation date: 1967
- Regional affiliation: FIBA Europe
- Headquarters: Ta' Qali
- President: Paul Sultana

Official website
- maltabasketball.web.geniussports.com
- (Malta)

The Malta Basketball Association is the governing body of basketball in Malta. It was founded in 1964 and became members of FIBA in 1967. It organizes the Maltese Division 1 and runs the men's and women's national basketball teams.

The current president of the federation is Paul Sultana.

== Achievements ==
- FIBA European Championship for Small Countries - 2018
- FIBA Women's European Championship for Small Countries - 2008, 2010, 2016

== See also ==
- Malta men's national basketball team
- Malta women's national basketball team
