= FIBA EuroBasket Women 2010 Division C =

Tournament details
- Host country: Armenia
- City: Yerevan
- Dates: 28 June – 3 July 2010
- Teams: 7 (from 1 confederation)
- Venue(s): 1 (in 1 host city)

Final positions
- Champions: Malta (2nd title)
- Runners-up: Armenia
- Third place: Scotland

Official website
- www.fibaeurope.com

The FIBA EuroBasket Women 2010 Division C was the 11th edition of the lowest tier of the women's European basketball championship, which is today known as FIBA Women's European Championship for Small Countries. The tournament took place in Yerevan, Armenia, from 28 June to 3 July 2010. Malta women's national basketball team won the tournament for the second time.

== Participating teams ==
- Andorra
- Armenia
- Gibraltar
- Malta
- Moldova
- Scotland
- Wales

== First round ==
In the first round, the teams were drawn into two groups. The first two teams from each group advance to the semifinals, the other teams will play in the 5th–7th place classification.

=== Group A ===
Pos	Team	Pld	W	L	PF	PA	PD	Pts	Qualification
1	Armenia	3	3	0	240	156	+84	6	Semifinals
2	Moldova	3	2	1	229	180	+49	5	Semifinals
3	Andorra	3	1	2	179	204	−25	4	5th–7th place classification
4	Gibraltar	3	0	3	137	245	−108	3	5th–7th place classification

Source: FIBA Archive

28 June 2010

Boxscore

Andorra	62–88	Moldova

28 June 2010

Boxscore

Armenia	98–45	Gibraltar

29 June 2010

Boxscore

Gibraltar	45–70	Andorra

29 June 2010

Boxscore

Moldova	64–71	Armenia

30 June 2010

Boxscore

Andorra	47–71	Armenia

30 June 2010

Boxscore

Gibraltar	47–77	Moldova

=== Group B ===
Pos	Team	Pld	W	L	PF	PA	PD	Pts	Qualification
1	Malta	2	2	0	145	78	+67	4	Semifinals
2	Scotland	2	1	1	121	105	+16	3	Semifinals
3	Wales	2	0	2	84	167	−83	2	5th–7th place classification

Source: FIBA Archive

28 June 2010

Boxscore

Scotland	35–64	Malta

29 June 2010

Boxscore

Wales	41–86	Scotland

30 June 2010

Boxscore

Malta	81–43	Wales

== 5th–7th place classification ==
=== Group C ===
Pos	Team	Pld	W	L	PF	PA	PD	Pts
5	Wales	2	2	0	110	91	+19	4
6	Andorra	2	1	1	108	86	+22	3
7	Gibraltar	2	0	2	98	139	−41	2

Source: FIBA Archive

2 July 2010

Boxscore

Gibraltar	53–69	Wales

3 July 2010

Boxscore

Wales	41–38	Andorra

== Playoffs ==
Semifinals
A1	Armenia	86
B2	Scotland	63
B1	Malta	85
A2	Moldova	57

Final
A1	Armenia	65
B1	Malta	74
3rd place match
B2	Scotland	88
A2	Moldova	67

=== Semifinals ===
2 July 2010

Boxscore

Armenia	86–63	Scotland

2 July 2010

Boxscore

Malta	85–57	Moldova

=== 3rd place match ===
3 July 2010

Boxscore

Scotland	88–67	Moldova

=== Final ===
3 July 2010

Boxscore

Armenia	65–74	Malta

== Final standings ==
Rank	Team
1st place, gold medalist(s)	Malta
2nd place, silver medalist(s)	Armenia
3rd place, bronze medalist(s)	Scotland
4	Moldova
5	Wales
6	Andorra
7	Gibraltar
