= FIBA Europe =

European basketball association

- Formation: 1957; 69 years ago
- Headquarters: Munich, Germany
- Members: 50 full member associations
- Official language: English
- President: (Spain) Jorge Garbajosa
- Parent organization: FIBA
- Website: fiba.basketball/europe

FIBA Europe is the administrative body for basketball in Europe, within the International Basketball Federation (FIBA), which includes all 50 national European basketball federations.

== Structure ==
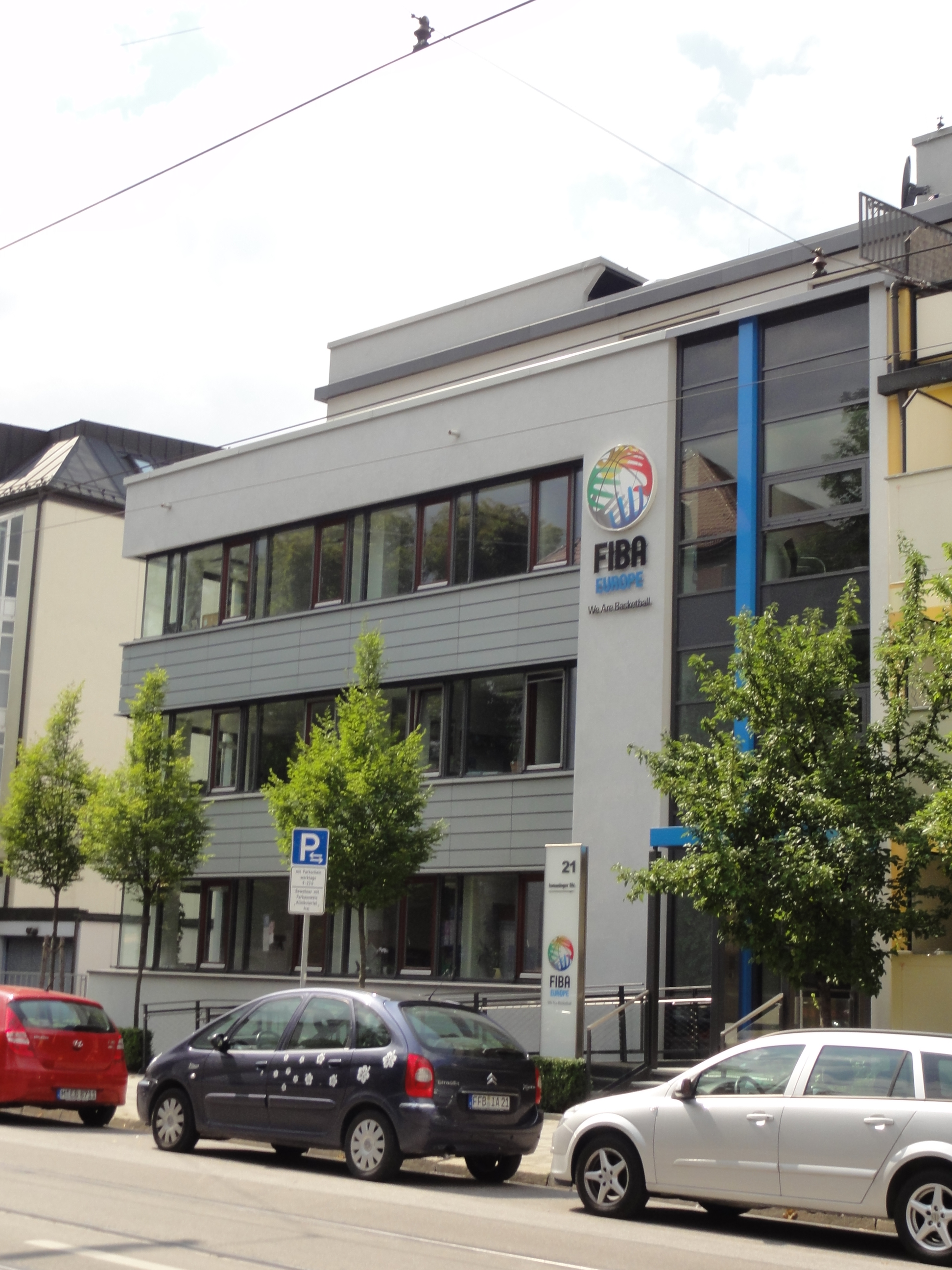
Headquarters of FIBA Europe, in Munich, Germany

FIBA Europe is one of five Regions of FIBA and is responsible for controlling and developing the sport of basketball in Europe. Among many tasks, this includes promoting, supervising and directing international competition at the club and national team levels, as well as governing and appointing European international referees. FIBA Europe is an international federation consisting of the national basketball federations of Europe. Currently 50 national federations are members.

The highest decision-making body is the Board of FIBA Europe which consists of 25 persons elected by the National Federations. The Board of FIBA Europe meets twice a year and is the executive body which represents all 50 Federations that make up the membership of FIBA Europe. All 50 federations meet once a year at the General Assembly of FIBA Europe.

=== The Board of FIBA Europe ===
The current board members are:

- (Spain) Jorge Garbajosa, president
- (Poland) Grzegorz Bachanski, treasurer
- (Belgium) Stefan Garaleas
- (Bulgaria) Georgi Glouchkov
- (Cyprus) Athos Antoniou
- (Czech Republic) Michal Konecny
- (Spain) Elisa Aguilar
- (Estonia) Keio Kuhi
- (Germany) Wolfgang Brenscheidt
- (Gibraltar) John Gonçalves
- (Greece) Asterios Zois
- (Hungary) Ivan Bodrogvary
- (Republic of Ireland) Bernard O'Byrne
- (Iceland) Hannes S. Jonsson
- (Israel) Amiram Halevy
- (Italy) Maurizio Bertea
- (Kosovo) Arben Fetahu
- (Latvia) Edgars Sneps
- (Netherlands) Maarten Hoffer
- (Portugal) Manuel Fernandes
- (Romania) Carmen Tocală
- (Slovenia) Matej Erjavec
- (Switzerland) Giancarlo Sergi
- (Sweden) Elisabeth Egnell
- (Turkey) Hüseyin Beşok

=== Current Executive Committee ===
Office	Officeholders
President	(Spain) Jorge Garbajosa
Treasurer	(Poland) Grzegorz Bachanski
Ex-officio members	(Greece) Andreas Zagklis

=== Presidents ===
#	Years	Name
1	2002–2010	(Greece) George Vassilakopoulos
2	2010–2013	(Iceland) Ólafur Rafnsson
3	2013–2014	(Belgium) Cyriel Coomas
4	2014–2023	(Turkey) Turgay Demirel
5	2023–present	(Spain) Jorge Garbajosa

=== Executive Directors ===
Until 1 January 2015, the position was titled as a Secretary General.

#	Years	Name
1	2002–2012	(Canada) Nar Zanolin
2	2012–present	(Czech Republic) Kamil Novak

== Competitions ==
=== FIBA Europe competitions ===
==== National teams ====
- EuroBasket:
  - Men's, played every four years
  - Women's, played biennially
- FIBA European Championship for Small Countries
  - Men's, played biennially
  - Women's, played biennially
- FIBA U20 EuroBasket, played annually
- FIBA U18 EuroBasket, played annually
- FIBA U16 EuroBasket, played annually
- FIBA U20 Women's EuroBasket, played annually
- FIBA U18 Women's EuroBasket, played annually
- FIBA U16 Women's EuroBasket, played annually

3x3 national teams

- FIBA 3x3 Europe Cup, (men and women)
- FIBA 3x3 U17 Europe Cup, (men and women)

==== Clubs ====
- European professional club basketball system
- Basketball Champions League, first-tier men's continental tournament
- FIBA Europe Cup, second-tier men's continental tournament
- Euroleague Basketball Next Generation Tournament
- Youth Basketball Champions League
- EuroLeague Women, first-tier women's continental tournament
- EuroCup Women, second-tier women's continental tournament
- FIBA Europe SuperCup Women, contested between the winners of EuroLeague and EuroCup

Defunct

- FIBA EuroChallenge
- FIBA EuroCup Challenge
- FIBA Korać Cup
- Ronchetti Cup
- FIBA Saporta Cup
- 2000–01 FIBA SuproLeague
- FIBA Europe All-Star Game
- FIBA EuroStars
- FIBA EuroCup All-Star Day

Note: The men's EuroLeague and EuroCup Basketball are not operated by FIBA Europe, but rather by Euroleague Basketball. Both competitions are sanctioned by FIBA and play under FIBA rules.

== Title holders ==
=== Continental champions ===
Competitions	Year	Champion	Title	Runners-up	Next edition
Men's competitions
EuroBasket	2025	Germany	2nd	Turkey	2029
U20 EuroBasket	2026	Slovenia	3rd	Serbia	2027
U18 EuroBasket	2026	Slovenia	1st	Italy	2027
U16 EuroBasket	2026	Latvia	1st	France	2027
3x3 Europe Cup	2026	Latvia	2nd	Netherlands	2027
Women's competitions
EuroBasket Women	2025	Belgium	2nd	Spain	2027
U20 Women's EuroBasket	2026	France	6th	Israel	2027
U18 Women's EuroBasket	2026	Spain	7th	France	2027
U16 Women's EuroBasket	2026	Spain	12th	Slovenia	2027
3x3 Women's Europe Cup	2026	Netherlands	3rd	Spain	2027

=== Continental club champions ===
Competitions	Year	Champion	Title	Runners-up	Next edition
Men's competitions
Basketball Champions League	2025–26	(Lithuania) Rytas	2nd	(Greece) AEK Betsson	2026–27
Europe Cup	2025–26	(Spain) Surne Bilbao Basket	2nd	(Greece) PAOK mateco	2026–27
Men's junior competitions
Euroleague Basketball Next Generation Tournament	2025–26	(Spain) Barcelona	2nd	(Spain) Real Madrid	2026–27
Youth Basketball Champions League	2026	(Lithuania) Rytas	3rd	(Bosnia and Herzegovina) Igokea	2027
Women's competitions
EuroLeague Women	2025–26	(Turkey) Fenerbahçe Opet	3rd	(Turkey) Galatasaray Çağdaş Faktoring	2026–27
EuroCup Women	2025–26	(Turkey) Çukurova Basketbol	1st	(Greece) Athinaikos	2026–27
SuperCup Women	2026	(Turkey) Fenerbahçe	3rd	(Turkey) ÇBK Mersin	2027

=== Titles by country ===
As of 23 August 2026

Yugoslavia – 19 / Serbia and Montenegro – 9

Country	Men				Women				3x3 Men		3x3 Women		Total
Country	Euro	U20	U18	U16	Euro	U20	U18	U16	Euro	U17	Euro	U17	Total
Soviet Union †	14	·	8	3	21	·	11	8	·	·	·	·	65
Spain	4	3	6	6	4	10	7	12	-	-	2	2	56
France	1	3	4	4	2	6	3	5	-	1	3	3	35
Russia	1	1	-	-	3	5	5	6	-	-	2	-	23
Yugoslavia †	8	1	5	8	-	·	1	-	·	·	·	·	23
Serbia	-	3	5	2	2	-	1	-	5	-	-	-	18
Lithuania	3	2	2	2	1	-	2	-	1	1	-	-	14
Italy	2	3	1	1	1	1	3	1	-	-	-	-	13
Greece	2	3	2	2	-	-	-	-	-	-	-	-	9
Croatia	-	-	3	4	-	-	-	-	-	1	-	-	8
Slovenia	1	3	1	-	-	-	1	-	1	1	-	-	8
Turkey	-	1	2	3	-	-	-	-	-	1	-	-	7
Belgium	-	-	-	-	2	-	2	-	-	1	-	1	6
Hungary	1	-	-	-	-	-	-	-	-	1	1	2	5
Serbia and Montenegro †	-	1	1	1	-	·	1	1	·	·	·	·	5
Germany	2	-	1	-	-	-	1	-	-	1	-	-	5
Czechoslovakia †	1	-	-	-	-	·	2	1	·	·	·	·	4
Czech Republic	-	-	-	-	1	1	-	1	-	-	-	-	3
Latvia	1	-	-	1	-	-	-	-	2	-	-	-	4
Israel	-	2	-	-	-	-	-	-	-	-	-	-	2
Netherlands	-	-	-	-	-	-	-	-	-	-	3	-	3
Austria	-	-	-	-	-	-	-	-	1	-	-	-	1
Belarus	-	1	-	-	-	-	-	-	-	-	-	-	1
Bosnia and Herzegovina	-	-	-	1	-	-	-	-	-	-	-	-	1
Bulgaria	-	-	-	-	1	-	-	-	-	-	-	-	1
CIS †	·	-	-	·	·	·	1	·	·	·	·	·	1
Egypt	1	·	·	·	·	·	·	·	·	·	·	·	1
Finland	-	-	-	-	-	-	-	1	-	-	-	-	1
Poland	-	-	-	-	1	-	-	-	-	-	-	-	1
Romania	-	-	-	-	-	-	-	-	1	-	-	-	1
Ukraine	-	-	-	-	1	-	-	-	-	-	-	-	1

Note: Titles won by nation, as recognized by FIBA Europe, including defunct states and Egypt, current member of FIBA Africa. The FIBA European Championship for Small Countries is not included in this ranking.

== Medals ==
As of 1 August 2025 (After 310 Events - Only A Divisions)

=== Events ===
1. FIBA EuroBasket (1935-2022) - 41 Editions
2. FIBA U20 European Championship (1992-2025) - 25 Editions
3. FIBA U18 European Championship (1964-2024) - 39 Editions
4. FIBA U16 European Championship (1971-2025) - 36 Editions
5. FIBA EuroBasket Women (1938-2025) - 40 Editions
6. FIBA U20 Women's European Championship (2000-2025) - 21 Editions
7. FIBA U18 Women's European Championship (1965-2025) - 40 Editions
8. FIBA U16 Women's European Championship (1976-2024) - 34 Editions
9. FIBA 3x3 Europe Cup (Men) (2014-2024) - 9 Editions
10. FIBA 3x3 Europe Cup (Women) (2014-2024) - 9 Editions
11. FIBA Europe Under-18 3x3 Championships (Men) (2015-2023) - 8 Editions
12. FIBA Europe Under-18 3x3 Championships (Women) (2015-2023) - 8 Editions

=== Without Precursors ===
Rank	Nation	Gold	Silver	Bronze	Total
1	Soviet Union (URS)*	65	9	10	84
2	Spain (ESP)	51	52	37	140
3	France (FRA)	33	37	37	107
4	Russia (RUS)	23	17	17	57
5	Yugoslavia (YUG)*	19	20	15	54
6	Serbia (SRB)	17	12	12	41
7	Italy (ITA)	13	24	32	69
8	Lithuania (LTU)	13	20	10	43
9	Greece (GRE)	9	8	8	25
10	Serbia and Montenegro (SCG)*	9	3	4	16
11	Croatia (CRO)	8	6	6	20
12	Turkey (TUR)	7	9	16	32
13	Slovenia (SLO)	6	6	4	16
14	Belgium (BEL)	6	3	4	13
15	Hungary (HUN)	5	9	11	25
16	Czechoslovakia (TCH)*	4	17	18	39
17	Germany (GER)	4	5	8	17
18	Czech Republic (CZE)	3	11	6	20
19	Latvia (LAT)	2	8	7	17
20	Israel (ISR)	2	5	3	10
21	Bulgaria (BUL)	1	9	12	22
22	Poland (POL)	1	6	12	19
23	Netherlands (NED)	1	3	7	11
24	Belarus (BLR)	1	2	2	5
24	Romania (ROU)	1	2	2	5
26	Ukraine (UKR)	1	1	3	5
27	Finland (FIN)	1	1	1	3
28	CIS (CIS)*	1	0	1	2
28	Egypt (EGY)*	1	0	1	2
30	Austria (AUT)	1	0	0	1
30	Bosnia and Herzegovina (BIH)	1	0	0	1
32	Slovakia (SVK)	0	3	1	4
33	Montenegro (MNE)	0	1	1	2
34	Portugal (POR)	0	1	0	1
35	Sweden (SWE)	0	0	2	2
36	East Germany (GDR)*	0	0	1	1
Totals (36 entries)		310	310	311	931

- Former Countries (Egypt Former Member).
- Exclude FIBA European Championship for Small Countries and FIBA Women's European Championship for Small Countries.

=== With Precursors ===
Rank	Nation	Gold	Silver	Bronze	Total
1	Russia (RUS)	89	26	28	143
2	Spain (ESP)	51	52	37	140
3	Serbia (SRB)	45	35	31	111
4	France (FRA)	33	37	37	107
5	Italy (ITA)	13	24	32	69
6	Lithuania (LTU)	13	20	10	43
7	Greece (GRE)	9	8	8	25
8	Croatia (CRO)	8	6	6	20
9	Czech Republic (CZE)	7	28	24	59
10	Turkey (TUR)	7	9	16	32
11	Slovenia (SLO)	6	6	4	16
12	Belgium (BEL)	6	3	4	13
13	Hungary (HUN)	5	9	11	25
14	Germany (GER)	4	5	9	18
15	Latvia (LAT)	2	8	7	17
16	Israel (ISR)	2	5	3	10
17	Bulgaria (BUL)	1	9	12	22
18	Poland (POL)	1	6	12	19
19	Netherlands (NED)	1	3	7	11
20	Belarus (BLR)	1	2	2	5
20	Romania (ROU)	1	2	2	5
22	Ukraine (UKR)	1	1	3	5
23	Finland (FIN)	1	1	1	3
24	Egypt (EGY)*	1	0	1	2
25	Austria (AUT)	1	0	0	1
25	Bosnia and Herzegovina (BIH)	1	0	0	1
27	Slovakia (SVK)	0	3	1	4
28	Montenegro (MNE)	0	1	1	2
29	Portugal (POR)	0	1	0	1
30	Sweden (SWE)	0	0	2	2
Totals (30 entries)		310	310	311	931

- Former Member.
- Exclude FIBA European Championship for Small Countries and FIBA Women's European Championship for Small Countries.
1. Russia + CIS + Soviet Union
2. Serbia + Serbia and Montenegro + Yugoslavia
3. Czech Republic + Czechoslovakia
4. Germany + East Germany

== FIBA World Rankings ==
=== Overview ===
FIBA Men's Rankings (as of 1 September 2026)
Europe*	FIBA	±	National Team	Points
1	2	Steady	Germany	877.4
2	3	▲1	France	870.9
3	4	▼1	Serbia	870.6
4	6	Steady	Spain	822.1
5	9	▲2	Turkey	808.1
6	10	Steady	Lithuania	801.3
7	12	Steady	Latvia	787.9
8	13	Steady	Greece	784.4
9	14	Steady	Slovenia	756.3
10	15	Steady	Italy	745.4
11	16	▲1	Finland	706
12	18	Steady	Montenegro	671.2
13	19	Steady	Poland	651.2
14	20	Steady	Georgia	614.7
15	23	Steady	Czech Republic	531
16	29	Steady	Israel	471.9
17	31	▲2	Bosnia and Herzegovina	465.7
18	32	▲2	Croatia	465.1
19	36	▼1	Belgium	412
20	37	▲1	Ukraine	410.6
21	38	▼2	Estonia	410.3
22	39	▲1	Sweden	405.5
23	44	▲1	Portugal	372.1
24	45	▼1	Iceland	366.7
25	46	▲1	Hungary	361.8
26	48	▼2	Great Britain	351.3
27	53	▼1	Netherlands	322.7
28	58	▼3	Bulgaria	275.1
29	60	▼1	Denmark	259.4
30	62	Steady	Romania	253
31	63	▼2	Switzerland	251
32	65	▼1	North Macedonia	237.7
33	66	Steady	Austria	234.5
34	69	Steady	Cyprus	212.4
35	72	▼2	Slovakia	209.1
36	83	▲1	Norway	148.4
37	85	▼2	Ireland	144.8
38	87	Steady	Luxembourg	135.6
39	88	Steady	Kosovo	133.8
40	93	▼1	Armenia	119.5
41	96	▼1	Albania	108.5
42	98	▼2	Andorra	106.9
43	100	▼1	Azerbaijan	103
44	101	▼1	Malta	102.8
45	112	▼2	San Marino	84.1
46	117	▼3	Gibraltar	77
*Local rankings based on FIBA ranking points

FIBA Women's Rankings (as of 14 September 2026)
Europe*	FIBA	±	National Team	Points
1	2	Steady	France	936.4
2	3	▲1	Spain	885.1
3	4	▲1	Germany	782.3
4	6	▼1	Belgium	714.2
5	13	▲1	Italy	480.4
6	15	▼3	Serbia	471.7
7	16	▲3	Hungary	418.8
8	17	▼1	Turkey	398.8
9	18	▼1	Czech Republic	397.3
10	24	▼2	Great Britain	326.4
11	25	▼2	Slovenia	322.7
12	26	▼2	Montenegro	322.6
13	27	▼1	Greece	312
14	28	▲1	Bosnia and Herzegovina	286.9
15	29	▼1	Sweden	286.3
16	32	▲2	Slovakia	247.3
17	33	▼2	Lithuania	244.8
18	35	▲2	Latvia	235.3
19	38	▲2	Croatia	223.3
20	40	▼2	Portugal	220.7
21	41	▲1	Ukraine	205.3
22	43	▲2	Poland	198.4
23	46	▲3	Switzerland	183.8
24	48	▲4	Israel	178.2
25	52	▲2	Luxembourg	167.9
26	54	▲2	Netherlands	161.7
27	56	▲3	Denmark	157.5
28	58	▲3	Bulgaria	152.4
29	60	▲3	Romania	141.7
30	63	▲3	Iceland	131.6
31	65	▲3	Norway	128
32	66	▼2	Finland	123.8
33	67	▲4	Estonia	123.7
34	70	▲7	North Macedonia	113
35	73	▲9	Austria	108.4
36	76	▲5	Cyprus	106.4
37	77	▲6	Ireland	104.3
38	82	▼3	Malta	96.4
39	85	Steady	Kosovo	81.2
40	88	Steady	Armenia	75.9
41	90	Steady	Albania	74
42	93	▲10	Azerbaijan	70.4
43	106	Steady	Andorra	50.8
44	107	Steady	Moldova	47.7
45	111	Steady	Gibraltar	39.3
46	119	▲1	Georgia	26
*Local rankings based on FIBA ranking points

==== Team of the Year ====
Teams ranking in the top four – Men's
Year	First	Second	Third	Fourth
2025	Germany	Serbia	France	Spain
2024	Serbia	Germany	France	Spain
2023	Spain	France	Serbia	Slovenia
2022	Spain	France	Serbia	Slovenia
2021	Spain	Slovenia	France	Serbia
2020	Spain	Serbia	France	Greece
2019	Spain	France	Serbia	Lithuania
2018	Spain	France	Serbia	Lithuania
2017	Spain	Serbia	France	Lithuania
2016	Spain	Lithuania	France	Serbia
2015	Spain	Lithuania	France	Russia
2014	Spain	Lithuania	Greece	Russia
2013	Spain	Greece	Lithuania	Russia
2012	Spain	Greece	Lithuania	Turkey
2011	Spain	Greece	Lithuania	Turkey

Teams ranking in the top four – Women's
Year	First	Second	Third	Fourth
2025	France	Spain	Belgium	Serbia
2024	Spain	Belgium	France	Serbia
2023	Spain	France	Belgium	Serbia
2022	Spain	Belgium	France	Turkey
2021	Spain	France	Belgium	Serbia
2020	Spain	France	Turkey	Belgium
2019	Spain	France	Turkey	Serbia
2018	Spain	France	Czech Republic	Turkey
2017	Spain	France	Czech Republic	Turkey
2016	Spain	France	Czech Republic	Russia
2015	Spain	France	Russia	Czech Republic
2014	Russia	France	Czech Republic	Spain
2013	Russia	Czech Republic	France	Spain
2012	Russia	Czech Republic	France	Spain
2011	Russia	Spain	Czech Republic	France

== Members ==
Code	Association	National teams	FIBA affiliation	IOC member
ALB	Albania	Men's; U20; U19; U18; U17; U16; Women's; U20; U19; U18; U17; U16	1947	Yes
AND	Andorra	Men's; U20; U19; U18; U17; U16; Women's; U20; U19; U18; U17; U16	1988	Yes
ARM	Armenia	Men's; U20; U19; U18; U17; U16; Women's; U20; U19; U18; U17; U16	1992	Yes
AUT	Austria	Men's; U20; U19; U18; U17; U16; Women's; U20; U19; U18; U17; U16	1934	Yes
AZE	Azerbaijan	Men's; U20; U19; U18; U17; U16; Women's; U20; U19; U18; U17; U16	1994	Yes
BLR	Belarus	Men's; U20; U19; U18; U17; U16; Women's; U20; U19; U18; U17; U16	1992	Yes
BEL	Belgium	Men's; U20; U19; U18; U17; U16; Women's; U20; U19; U18; U17; U16	1933	Yes
BIH	Bosnia and Herzegovina	Men's; U20; U19; U18; U17; U16; Women's; U20; U19; U18; U17; U16	1992	Yes
BUL	Bulgaria	Men's; U20; U19; U18; U17; U16; Women's; U20; U19; U18; U17; U16	1935	Yes
CRO	Croatia	Men's; U20; U19; U18; U17; U16; Women's; U20; U19; U18; U17; U16	1992	Yes
CYP	Cyprus	Men's; U20; U19; U18; U17; U16; Women's; U20; U19; U18; U17; U16	1974	Yes
CZE	Czech Republic	Men's; U20; U19; U18; U17; U16; Women's; U20; U19; U18; U17; U16	1932	Yes
DEN	Denmark	Men's; U20; U19; U18; U17; U16; Women's; U20; U19; U18; U17; U16	1951	Yes
EST	Estonia	Men's; U20; U19; U18; U17; U16; Women's; U20; U19; U18; U17; U16	1934 (Note: Suspended in 1940 due to Soviet occupation, re-joined in 1991.)	Yes
FIN	Finland	Men's; U20; U19; U18; U17; U16; Women's; U20; U19; U18; U17; U16	1939	Yes
FRA	France	Men's; U20; U19; U18; U17; U16; Women's; U20; U19; U18; U17; U16	1933	Yes
GEO	(Georgia (country)) Georgia	Men's; U20; U19; U18; U17; U16; Women's; U20; U19; U18; U17; U16	1992	Yes
GER	Germany	Men's; U20; U19; U18; U17; U16; Women's; U20; U19; U18; U17; U16	1934	Yes
GIB	Gibraltar	Men's; U20; U19; U18; U17; U16; Women's; U20; U19; U18; U17; U16	1985	No (Note: Part of the British Olympic Association.)
GBR	(United Kingdom) Great Britain	Men's; U20; U19; U18; U17; U16; Women's; U20; U19; U18; U17; U16	2006	Yes
GRE	Greece	Men's; U20; U19; U18; U17; U16; Women's; U20; U19; U18; U17; U16	1936	Yes
HUN	Hungary	Men's; U20; U19; U18; U17; U16; Women's; U20; U19; U18; U17; U16	1935	Yes
ISL	Iceland	Men's; U20; U19; U18; U17; U16; Women's; U20; U19; U18; U17; U16	1959	Yes
IRL	(Republic of Ireland) Ireland	Men's; U20; U19; U18; U17; U16; Women's; U20; U19; U18; U17; U16	1947	Yes
ISR	Israel	Men's; U20; U19; U18; U17; U16; Women's; U20; U19; U18; U17; U16	1939	Yes
ITA	Italy	Men's; U20; U19; U18; U17; U16; Women's; U20; U19; U18; U17; U16	1932	Yes
KOS	Kosovo	Men's; U20; U19; U18; U17; U16; Women's; U20; U19; U18; U17; U16	2015	Yes
LAT	Latvia	Men's; U20; U19; U18; U17; U16; Women's; U20; U19; U18; U17; U16	1932 (Note: Suspended in 1940 due to Soviet occupation, re-joined in 1992.)	Yes
LTU	Lithuania	Men's; U20; U19; U18; U17; U16; Women's; U20; U19; U18; U17; U16	1936	Yes
LUX	Luxembourg	Men's; U20; U19; U18; U17; U16; Women's; U20; U19; U18; U17; U16	1946	Yes
MLT	Malta	Men's; U20; U19; U18; U17; U16; Women's; U20; U19; U18; U17; U16	1967	Yes
MDA	Moldova	Men's; U20; U19; U18; U17; U16; Women's; U20; U19; U18; U17; U16	1992	Yes
MON	Monaco	Men's; U20; U19; U18; U17; U16; Women's; U20; U19; U18; U17; U16	1987	Yes
MNE	Montenegro	Men's; U20; U19; U18; U17; U16; Women's; U20; U19; U18; U17; U16	2006	Yes
NED	Netherlands	Men's; U20; U19; U18; U17; U16; Women's; U20; U19; U18; U17; U16	1946	Yes
MKD	North Macedonia	Men's; U20; U19; U18; U17; U16; Women's; U20; U19; U18; U17; U16	1993	Yes
NOR	Norway	Men's; U20; U19; U18; U17; U16; Women's; U20; U19; U18; U17; U16	1968	Yes
POL	Poland	Men's; U20; U19; U18; U17; U16; Women's; U20; U19; U18; U17; U16	1934	Yes
POR	Portugal	Men's; U20; U19; U18; U17; U16; Women's; U20; U19; U18; U17; U16	1932	Yes
ROU	Romania	Men's; U20; U19; U18; U17; U16; Women's; U20; U19; U18; U17; U16	1932	Yes
RUS	Russia	Men's; U20; U19; U18; U17; U16; Women's; U20; U19; U18; U17; U16	1947	Yes
SMR	(San Marino) San Marino	Men's; U20; U19; U18; U17; U16; Women's; U20; U19; U18; U17; U16	1969	Yes
SRB	Serbia	Men's; U20; U19; U18; U17; U16; Women's; U20; U19; U18; U17; U16	1936	Yes
SVK	Slovakia	Men's; U20; U19; U18; U17; U16; Women's; U20; U19; U18; U17; U16	1993	Yes
SLO	Slovenia	Men's; U20; U19; U18; U17; U16; Women's; U20; U19; U18; U17; U16	1992	Yes
ESP	Spain	Men's; U20; U19; U18; U17; U16; Women's; U20; U19; U18; U17; U16	1934	Yes
SWE	Sweden	Men's; U20; U19; U18; U17; U16; Women's; U20; U19; U18; U17; U16	1952	Yes
SUI	Switzerland	Men's; U20; U19; U18; U17; U16; Women's; U20; U19; U18; U17; U16	1932	Yes
TUR	Turkey	Men's; U20; U19; U18; U17; U16; Women's; U20; U19; U18; U17; U16	1936	Yes
UKR	Ukraine	Men's; U20; U19; U18; U17; U16; Women's; U20; U19; U18; U17; U16	1992	Yes

=== Defunct members ===
Code	Association	National teams	FIBA affiliation	FIBA disaffiliation
TCH	Czechoslovakia	Men's; U20; U19; U18; U17; U16; Women's; U20; U19; U18; U17; U16		1992
GDR	East Germany	Men's; U20; U19; U18; U17; U16; Women's; U20; U19; U18; U17; U16	1952	1990
ENG	England (Note: Integrated in the British Association.)	Men's; U20; U19; U18; U17; U16; Women's; U20; U19; U18; U17; U16	1937	
SCG	Serbia and Montenegro	Men's; U20; U19; U18; U17; U16; Women's; U20; U19; U18; U17; U16	1992	2006
SCO	Scotland	Men's; U20; U19; U18; U17; U16; Women's; U20; U19; U18; U17; U16	1947	
URS	Soviet Union	Men's; U20; U19; U18; U17; U16; Women's; U20; U19; U18; U17; U16		1992
WAL	Wales	Men's; U20; U19; U18; U17; U16; Women's; U20; U19; U18; U17; U16	1956	
YUG	(Socialist Federal Republic of Yugoslavia) Yugoslavia	Men's; U20; U19; U18; U17; U16; Women's; U20; U19; U18; U17; U16	1949	1992

== See also ==
- FIBA Europe Men's Player of the Year Award
- FIBA Europe Young Men's Player of the Year Award
- FIBA Europe Women's Player of the Year Award
- FIBA Europe Young Women's Player of the Year Award
