= 2014–15 Albanian Basketball Superleague =

- League: Albanian Basketball Superleague
- Sport: Basketball
- Games: 30 (Regular Season)
- Teams: 6
- TV partner: TVSH

Regular Season
- Season champions: PBC Tirana

2015 ABL Playoffs
- Finals champions: BC Vllaznia
- Runners-up: PBC Tirana

ABL seasons
- ← 2013–14 2015–16 →

The 2014–15 Albanian Basketball Superleague, will be the 49th season of the top professional basketball league in Albania. The regular season started on 17 October 2014 and the defending champions were BC Vllaznia. The finals were contested between the regular season champions PBC Tirana and the holders BC Vllaznia, with BC Vllaznia retaining their title on 28 April 2015.

== Clubs and Arenas ==
Locations of the 2014–15 Albanian Superliga teams

Club	Location	Founded	Arena	Capacity	Head coach
Apolonia	Fier	1925	Fier Sports Palace	1,000	(Albania) Darian Adhamidhi
Flamurtari	Vlorë	1924	Vlorë Sports Palace	1,000	(Albania) Vladimir Birçe
Kamza	Kamëz	1962	Bathore Sports Hall	400	(Albania) Adem Muhametaj
Partizani	Tirana	1946	Asllan Rusi Sports Palace	3,000	(Albania) E.Ismeti
Tirana	Tirana	1946	Farie Hoti Sports Palace	3,000	(Albania) Bujar Shehu
Vllaznia	Shkodër	1919	Qazim Dërvishi Sports Palace	1,200	(Albania) Bledar Gjeçaj

== Regular season ==
=== League table ===
Pos	Team	Pld	W	L	PF	PA	PD	Pts	Qualification or relegation
1	Tirana	20	17	3	1792	1346	+446	37	Playoffs
2	Vllaznia	20	16	4	1696	1447	+249	36	Playoffs
3	Kamza	20	13	7	1663	1331	+332	33	Playoffs
4	Partizani	20	9	11	1325	1575	−250	29	Playoffs
5	Flamurtari	20	5	15	1385	1516	−131	25	Relegation playoffs
6	Apolonia	20	0	20	1103	1749	−646	20	Relegated

Source: Eurobasket

== Playoffs ==
Semifinals
1	Tirana	2
4	Partizani	0
2	Vllaznia	2
3	Kamza	1

Finals
1	Tirana	0
2	Vllaznia	3

Relegation playoffs
Flamurtari	2
Studenti	1

Source: Albaniansport
