= Andorra women's national basketball team =

Andorra
- FIBA ranking: 106 (18 March 2026)
- Joined FIBA: 1988
- FIBA zone: FIBA Europe
- National federation: Federació Andorrana de Basquetbol

Championship for Small Countries
- Appearances: 11
- Medals: (1) 2000

First international
- Iceland 100–39 Andorra (Valletta, Malta; 26 June 1996)

Biggest win
- Ireland 104–33 Andorra (Nicosia, Macedonia; 20 July 2021)

Biggest defeat
- Andorra 84–25 Gibraltar (Andorra la Vella, Andorra; 18 June 2002)

The Andorra women's national basketball team represents Andorra in international women's basketball competitions.

== Competitive record ==
=== Championship for Small Countries ===
Year	Pos	Pld	W	L
(Malta) 1996	8th	5	0	5
(North Macedonia) 2000	3rd	4	2	2
(Andorra) 2002	5th	4	2	2
(Andorra) 2004	9th	5	1	4
(Malta) 2006	5th	4	2	2
(Luxembourg) 2008	4th	5	2	3
(Armenia) 2010	6th	4	1	3
(Gibraltar) 2016	4th	5	2	3
(Cyprus) 2021	6th	3	0	3
(Cyprus) 2022	5th	4	0	4
(Kosovo) 2024	7th	5	1	4
Total		48	13	35
