= FIBA Women's European Championship for Small Countries =

European women's basketball competition

- Current season, competition or edition: 2026 FIBA Women's European Championship for Small Countries
- Formerly: Promotion Cup for Women; EuroBasket Women Division C
- Sport: Basketball
- Founded: 1989; 37 years ago
- First season: 1989
- Countries: Lowest-ranked FIBA Europe teams
- Continent: FIBA Europe (Europe)
- Most recent champion: Malta (4th title)
- Most titles: Austria (5 titles)
- Related competitions: EuroBasket Women
- Website: www.fiba.basketball/history

The FIBA Women's European Championship for Small Countries is the lowest-ranked tier of the biannual FIBA EuroBasket Women competition, organized by FIBA Europe.

== History ==
This championship was first introduced in 1989, as the Promotion Cup, the competition organized for the lowest ranked European national basketball teams. Since then, the competition has been held biannually. In 2007, the Promotion Cup was officially renamed EuroBasket Division C.

In 2011, after the divisional system for the FIBA EuroBasket was abolished, the FIBA EuroBasket Division C was renamed FIBA European Championship for Small Countries.

== Results ==
Year	Host	Final match			Third place match		
Year	Host	First place	Score	Second place	Third place	Score	Fourth place
1989 details	Luxembourg	Austria	63–57	Ireland	Luxembourg	73–52	Iceland
1991 details	Gibraltar	Turkey	95–65	Ireland	Austria	67–58	Luxembourg
1993 details	Cyprus (Nicosia)	Austria	68–54	Ireland	Cyprus	57–51	Iceland
1996 details	Malta (Valletta)	Iceland	81–73	Albania	Luxembourg	65–58	Cyprus
1998 details	Austria (Oberpullendorf)	Austria	85–45	Luxembourg	Cyprus	53–51	Iceland
2000 details	Macedonia (Ohrid)	Macedonia	Group tournament	Scotland	Andorra	Group tournament	Malta
2002 details	Andorra (Andorra la Vella)	Albania	84–79	Iceland	Cyprus	71–61	Luxembourg
2004 details	Andorra (Andorra la Vella)	Iceland	81–66	Luxembourg	Malta	69–61	Armenia
2006 details	Malta (Ta' Qali)	Luxembourg	54–49	Scotland	Moldova	81–75	Malta
2008 details	Luxembourg	Malta	81–61	Albania	Luxembourg	55–45	Andorra
2010 details	Armenia (Yerevan)	Malta	74–65	Armenia	Scotland	88–67	Moldova
2012 details	Macedonia (Ohrid)	Austria	68–63	Macedonia	Malta	72–52	Scotland
2014 details	Austria (Sankt Pölten)	Austria	87–81	Iceland	Malta	66–59	Scotland
2016 details	Gibraltar	Malta	67–59	Ireland	Moldova	66–50	Andorra
2018 details	Ireland (Cork)	Denmark	93–59	Luxembourg	Malta	67–59	Norway
2021 details	Cyprus (Nicosia)	Luxembourg	69–59	Ireland	Kosovo	70–60	Malta
2022 details	Cyprus (Nicosia)	Cyprus	Group Tournament	Norway	Malta	Group Tournament	Kosovo
2024 details	Kosovo (Pristina)	Norway	61–54	Malta	Albania	73–61	Cyprus
2026 details	Kosovo (Peja)	Malta	72–55	Albania	Kosovo	86–52	Armenia

== Performance ==
Rank	Nation	Gold	Silver	Bronze	Total
1	Austria	5	0	1	6
2	Malta	4	1	5	10
3	Luxembourg	2	3	3	8
4	Iceland	2	2	0	4
5	Albania	1	3	1	5
6	North Macedonia	1	1	0	2
6	Norway	1	1	0	2
8	Cyprus	1	0	3	4
9	Denmark	1	0	0	1
9	Turkey	1	0	0	1
11	Ireland	0	5	0	5
12	Scotland	0	2	1	3
13	Armenia	0	1	0	1
14	Kosovo	0	0	2	2
14	Moldova	0	0	2	2
16	Andorra	0	0	1	1
Totals (16 entries)		19	19	19	57

== Participation details ==
Team	(Luxembourg) 1989	(Gibraltar) 1991	(Cyprus) 1993	(Malta) 1996	(Austria) 1998	(North Macedonia) 2000	(Andorra) 2002	(Andorra) 2004	(Malta) 2006	(Luxembourg) 2008	(Armenia) 2010	(North Macedonia) 2012	(Austria) 2014	(Gibraltar) 2016	(Republic of Ireland) 2018	(Cyprus) 2021	(Cyprus) 2022	(Kosovo) 2024	(Kosovo) 2026	Total
Albania				2nd			1st			2nd								3rd	2nd	5
Andorra				8th		3rd	5th	9th	5th	4th	6th			4th		6th	5th	7th	6th	12
Armenia					7th			4th			2nd							6th	4th	5
Austria	1st	3rd	1st		1st							1st	1st							6
Azerbaijan								7th		7th		7th	6th							4
Cyprus	6th	6th	3rd	4th	3rd		3rd	6th							5th	5th	1st	4th		11
Denmark															1st					1
Georgia																		8th	5th	2
Gibraltar	8th	7th	8th	7th	6th	5th	7th	8th	7th	8th	7th	5th	7th	5th	8th					15
Iceland	4th	5th	4th	1st	4th		2nd	1st					2nd							8
Ireland	2nd	2nd	2nd											2nd	6th	2nd				6
Kosovo																3rd	4th	5th	3rd	4
Luxembourg	3rd	4th	5th	3rd	2nd		4th	2nd	1st	3rd					2nd	1st				11
Malta	7th			5th	5th	4th	6th	3rd	4th	1st	1st	3rd	3rd	1st	3rd	4th	3rd	2nd	1st	17
Moldova									3rd		4th	8th		3rd	7th					5
North Macedonia						1st						2nd								2
Norway															4th		2nd	1st		3
Scotland						2nd		5th	2nd	5th	3rd	4th	4th							7
Switzerland			6th																	1
Turkey		1st																		1
Wales	5th	8th	7th	6th	8th			10th	6th	6th	5th	6th	5th	6th						12
