= Azerbaijan women's national basketball team =

Azerbaijan
- FIBA ranking: 94 ▼1 (14 September 2026)
- Joined FIBA: 1994
- FIBA zone: FIBA Europe
- National federation: Azerbaijan Basketball Federation

Championship for Small Countries
- Appearances: 4
- Medals: None
Home	Away

First international
- Azerbaijan 68–72 Malta (Andorra la Vella, Andorra; 27 July 2004)

Biggest win
- Azerbaijan 81–38 Gibraltar (Andorra la Vella, Andorra; 31 July 2004)

Biggest defeat
- Azerbaijan 28–136 Belgium (Baku, Azerbaijan; 12 November 2023)

The Azerbaijan women's national basketball team (Azerbaijani: Azərbaycan qadın milli baskebol komandası) represents Azerbaijan in international women's basketball competitions.

== Competitive record ==
=== FIBA Women's EuroBasket ===
Year	Position	Pld	W	L
(Italy) 1993 to (Israel) (Slovenia) 2023	Did not enter			
(Czech Republic) (Germany) (Italy) (Greece) 2025	Did not qualify			
(Belgium) (Finland) (Sweden) (Lithuania) 2027	Did not qualify			
Total		0	0	0

=== Women's European Championship for Small Countries ===
Year	Position	Pld	W	L
(Andorra) 2004	7th	5	3	2
(Luxembourg) 2008	7th	5	2	3
(North Macedonia) 2012	7th	5	2	3
(Austria) 2014	6th	4	1	3
Total		19	8	11

== Notable players ==
- Tiffany Hayes
- Aneika Henry

== See also ==
- Azerbaijan women's national 3x3 team
- Azerbaijan men's national basketball team
- Azerbaijan Basketball Federation
