= Moldova women's national basketball team =

Moldova
- FIBA ranking: 107 (18 March 2026)
- Joined FIBA: 1992
- FIBA zone: FIBA Europe
- National federation: Basketball Federation of Moldova
- Coach: Vacant

World Cup
- Appearances: None

EuroBasket
- Appearances: 2
- Medals: None

Championship for Small Countries
- Appearances: 5
- Medals: (bronze) Bronze: (2006, 2016)
Home	Away

The Moldova women's national basketball team represents Moldova in international women's basketball. They are controlled by the Basketball Federation of Moldova.

== Competitive record ==
=== EuroBasket & Championship for Small Countries ===
Year	EuroBasket	Small Countries
1995	6th	
1997	7th	
2006		3rd place, bronze medalist(s)
2010		4th
2012		8th
2016		3rd place, bronze medalist(s)
2018		7th

== See also ==
- Moldova women's national under-18 basketball team
- Moldova women's national under-16 basketball team
- Moldova men's national basketball team
