= Ebi Dishnica =

Albanian basketball player (born 1997)

Partizani
- Position: Power forward / center
- League: Albanian A-1 League

Personal information
- Born: February 24, 1997 (age 29) Tirana, Albania
- Listed height: 1.82 m (6 ft 0 in)

Career information
- Playing career: 2015–present

Career history
- 2015–2016: Goca Basket
- 2016–present: PBC Tirana

Ebi Dishnica (born 24 February 1997 in Tirana, Albania) is a professional Albanian basketball player. She currently plays for Partizani in the First League in Albania. She is the youngest player to ever play in the national basketball Albania women's national basketball team number 12. From 30 July to 9 August 2015, she played for U18 European Championship and scored 12.1 ppg and 8.6 rpg. She is 182 cm (6.0 ft) tall.

== External files ==
- Profile at eurobasket.com
- Photograph of Ebi Dishnica
