= Basketball Federation of Armenia =

Governing body of basketball

- Founded: 1989
- Affiliation: FIBA Europe
- Affiliation date: 1992
- Regional affiliation: FIBA
- Headquarters: Yerevan
- President: Hrachya Rostomyan

Official website
- bfa.am

The Basketball Federation of Armenia (BFA) (Armenian: Հայաստանի բասկետբոլի ֆեդերացիա) is the national governing body of basketball in Armenia. It was founded in 1989, and is headquartered in Yerevan.

The Basketball Federation of Armenia operates the Armenia men's national team and Armenia women's national team. They organize national competitions in Armenia, for both the men's and women's senior teams and also the youth national basketball teams.

The top professional league in Armenia is the Armenia Basketball League A.

== History ==
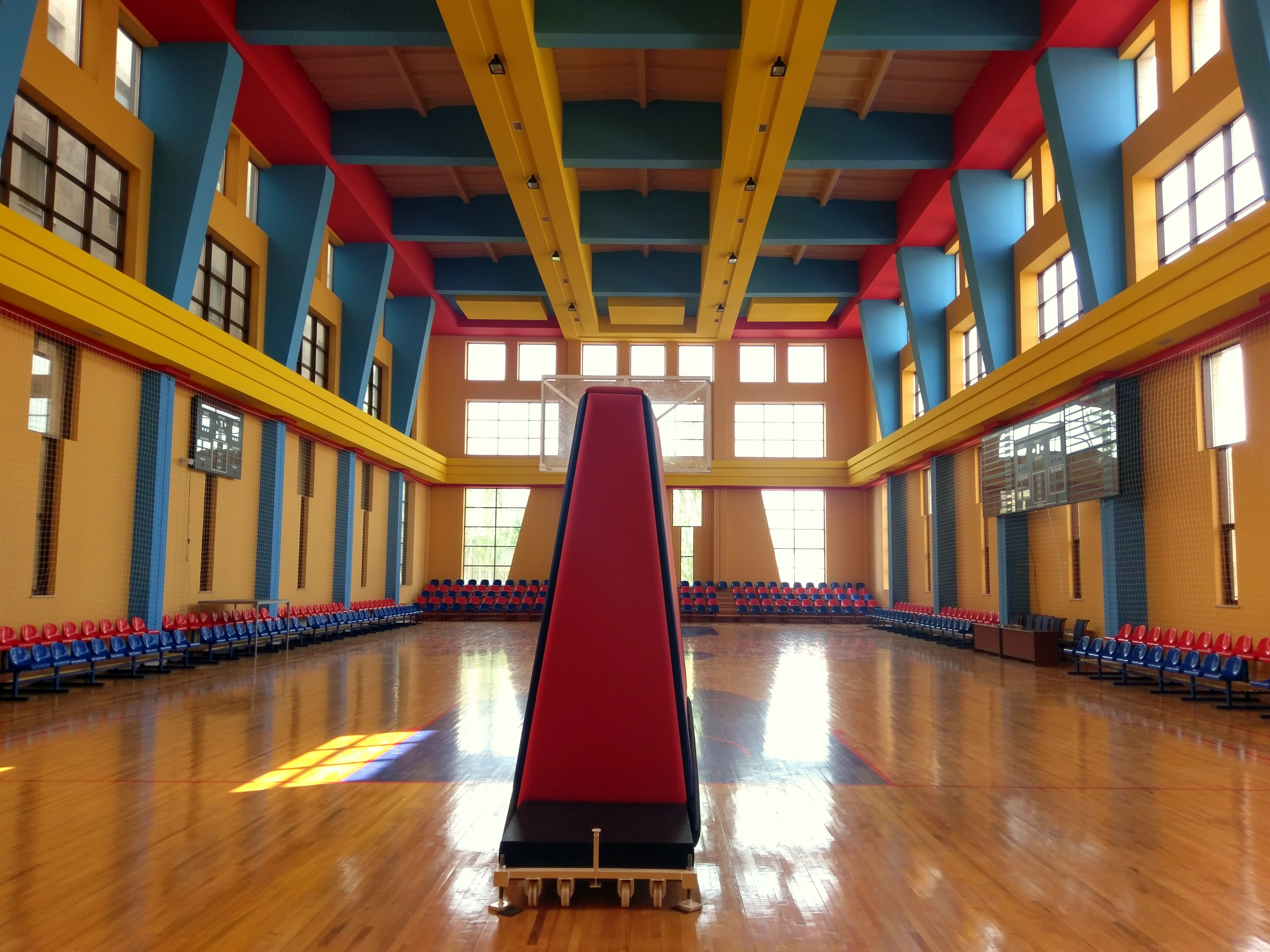
The official training hall of the team at the Olympic complex in Yerevan

The Basketball Federation of Armenia (BFA) was established in 1989 and is headquartered in Yerevan, Armenia. The BFA joined the International Basketball Federation in 1992 and holds full membership in FIBA Europe. Since 2006, Hrachya Rostomyan has been president of the BFA. The BFA manages Armenia's basketball participation in both World and European competitions. In 2016, the BFA organized Armenia's first competition in the FIBA European Championship for Small Countries, with the Armenian team winning the tournament that year.

Armenia qualified to participate in EuroBasket 2022; however, the BFA announced its intentions to withdraw from the competition due to financial constraints.

In 2022, Armenia made its return to international play by entering the 2022 FIBA European Championship for Small Countries. The national team would make it all the way to the final to beat Malta 84–68, and finishing the tournament undefeated.

== Activities ==
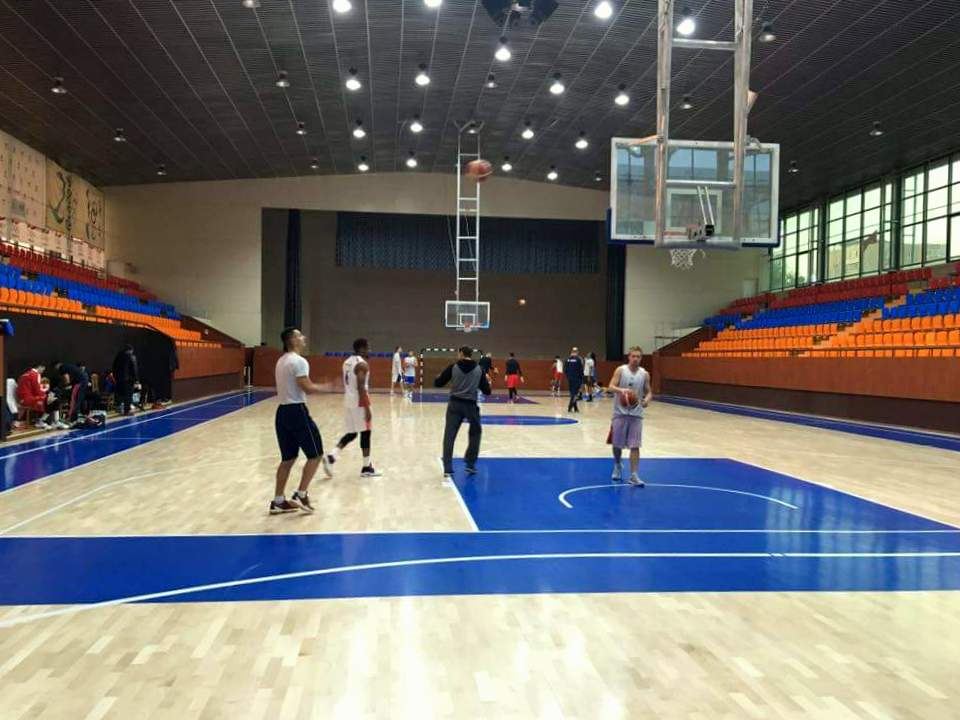
The Armenia national team at the Mika Arena

In 2006, Armen Hovhannissian was appointed as a basketball representative of Armenia to the CIS and Baltic states. The Basketball Federation of Armenia later opened its first foreign representation in Moscow, headed by Hovhannissian, which was aimed at coordinating Armenia's basketball cooperation in the region.

Since 2011, the Basketball Federation of Armenia has been working actively to recruit Armenian basketball players from all over the world to create teams. In 2015, Ara Poghosyan was nominated to coordinate basketball activities, tournaments, and recruitment across the Armenian Diaspora and to seek competitors to participate in the Pan-Armenian Games.

In September 2018, the BFA helped to organize the EU's European Week of Sports events across Yerevan, in cooperation with the country's Ministry of Sport and Youth Affairs.

In April 2020, the BFA announced plans to increase marketing campaigns to boost both local and international interest in Armenian basketball.

In 2021, the FIBA U20 Women's European Challengers took place in Armenia. It was held from 12 to 18 July to replace the canceled 2021 FIBA Women's European Under-20 Championship.

== Presidents ==
- Hrant Vardanyan (1989–2002)
- Aristakes Navasardyan (2002–2006)
- Hrachya Rostomyan (2006–present)

== See also ==
- Armenia men's national basketball team
- Armenia men's national under-20 basketball team
- Armenia men's national under-18 basketball team
- Armenia men's national under-16 basketball team
- Armenia women's national basketball team
- Armenia women's national under-20 basketball team
- Armenia women's national under-18 basketball team
- Armenia women's national under-16 basketball team
- Armenia Basketball League A
- Sport in Armenia
