= 2021 FIBA Women's European Championship for Small Countries =

Tournament details
- Host country: Cyprus
- City: Nicosia
- Dates: 20–25 July 2021
- Teams: 6 (from 1 confederation)
- Venue: 1 (in 1 host city)

Final positions
- Champions: Luxembourg (2nd title)
- Runners-up: Ireland
- Third place: Kosovo

Official website
- www.fiba.basketball

The 2021 FIBA Women's European Championship for Small Countries was the 16th edition of this competition. The tournament took place in Nicosia, Cyprus, from 20 to 25 July 2021. Luxembourg women's national basketball team won the tournament for the second time.

== Participating teams ==
- Andorra
- Cyprus
- Ireland
- Kosovo
- Luxembourg
- Malta

== Group phase ==
In this round, the teams were drawn into two groups of three. The first two teams from each group advance to the semifinals, the last teams will play the 5th place playoff.

=== Group A ===
Pos	Team	Pld	W	L	PF	PA	PD	Pts	Qualification
1	Ireland	2	2	0	182	81	+101	4	Semifinals
2	Malta	2	1	1	127	108	+19	3	Semifinals
3	Andorra	2	0	2	63	183	−120	2	5th place match

Source: FIBA

20 July 2021

Boxscore

Ireland	104–33	Andorra

21 July 2021

Boxscore

Andorra	30–79	Malta

22 July 2021

Boxscore

Malta	48–78	Ireland

=== Group B ===
Pos	Team	Pld	W	L	PF	PA	PD	Pts	Qualification
1	Luxembourg	2	2	0	184	125	+59	4	Semifinals
2	Kosovo	2	1	1	135	162	−27	3	Semifinals
3	Cyprus	2	0	2	128	160	−32	2	5th place match

Source: FIBA

20 July 2021

Boxscore

Cyprus	68–70	Kosovo

21 July 2021

Boxscore

Kosovo	65–94	Luxembourg

22 July 2021

Boxscore

Luxembourg	90–60	Cyprus

== Playoffs ==
Semifinals
A1	Ireland	86
B2	Kosovo	72
B1	Luxembourg	89
A2	Malta	46

Finals
A1	Ireland	59
B1	Luxembourg	69
3rd place match
B2	Kosovo	70
A2	Malta	60

=== Semifinals ===
24 July 2021

Boxscore

Ireland	86–72	Kosovo

24 July 2021

Boxscore

Luxembourg	89–46	Malta

=== 5th place match ===
24 July 2021

Boxscore

Andorra	36–87	Cyprus

=== 3rd place match ===
25 July 2021

Boxscore

Kosovo	70–60	Malta

=== Final ===
25 July 2021

Boxscore

Ireland	59–69	Luxembourg

== Final standings ==
Rank	Team
1st place, gold medalist(s)	Luxembourg
2nd place, silver medalist(s)	Ireland
3rd place, bronze medalist(s)	Kosovo
4	Malta
5	Cyprus
6	Andorra
