= Georgian Basketball Federation =

Governing body for basketball in Georgia

- Founded: 4 June 1991
- Affiliation: FIBA Europe
- Affiliation date: 1992
- Regional affiliation: FIBA
- Headquarters: Tbilisi
- President: Viktor Sanikidze

Official website
- www.gbf.ge

The Georgian Basketball Federation (abbr. GBF; Georgian: საქართველოს კალათბურთის ფედერაცია) is the national governing body of basketball in Georgia. It was founded on 4 June 1991, and is headquartered in Tbilisi.

The Georgian Basketball Federation operates the Georgia men's national team and Georgia women's national team. They organize national competitions in Georgia, for both the men's and women's senior teams and also the youth national basketball teams.

The top professional league in Georgia is the Georgian Superliga.

== Presidents ==
№	Name	Image	Took office	Left office
1	Aleksandre Chkheidze		4 June 1991	1995
2	Avtandil Sakvarelidze		1995	1997
3	Giorgi Katamadze		1997	2001
4 (I)	Besik Liparteliani		2001	2005
4 (II)	Besik Liparteliani		2005	11 November 2009
4 (III)	Besik Liparteliani		11 November 2009	11 December 2013
5	Mikheil Gabrichidze		11 December 2013	11 December 2017
6	Paata Guraspauli		11 December 2017	11 December 2021
7 (I)	Viktor Sanikidze		11 December 2021	8 November 2025
7 (II)	Viktor Sanikidze		8 November 2025	Incumbent

== See also ==
- Georgia men's national basketball team
- Georgia men's national under-20 basketball team
- Georgia men's national under-18 basketball team
- Georgia men's national under-16 basketball team
- Georgia women's national basketball team
- Georgia women's national under-20 basketball team
- Georgia women's national under-18 basketball team
- Georgia women's national under-16 basketball team
