= Basketball Austria =

Governing body of basketball in Austria

- Founded: 1934; 92 years ago
- Affiliation: FIBA Europe
- Headquarters: Vienna
- President: Helmut Niederhofer

Official website
- basketballaustria.at

Basketball Austria (German: Basketball Österreich) is the governing body of basketball in Austria. It joined FIBA in 1934, and is headquartered in Vienna.

The Austrian Basketball Federation operates the Austria men's national team and Austria women's national team. They organise national competitions in Austria, for both the men's and women's senior teams and also the youth national basketball teams.

The top professional league in Austria is the Austrian Basketball Superliga.

The federation used to be named Austrian Basketball Federation or Österreichischer Basketballverband (ÖBV).

== See also ==
- Austria men's national basketball team
- Austria men's national under-20 basketball team
- Austria men's national under-18 basketball team
- Austria men's national under-16 basketball team
- Austria women's national basketball team
- Austria women's national under-20 basketball team
- Austria women's national under-18 basketball team
- Austria women's national under-16 basketball team
