= 2027 FIBA 3x3 Europe Cup =

The 2027 FIBA 3x3 Europe Cup consists of two sections:

- 2027 FIBA 3x3 Europe Cup – Men's tournament
- 2027 FIBA 3x3 Europe Cup – Women's tournament
