= Þorvaldsdóttir =

Þorvaldsdóttir is a surname of Icelandic origin, meaning daughter of Þorvald. In Icelandic names, the name is not strictly a surname, but a patronymic. The name refers to:

- Anna S. Þorvaldsdóttir (b. 1977), Icelandic composer
- Jóhanna Bergmann Þorvaldsdóttir, Icelandic farmer
