= Georgia women's national basketball team =

Georgia
- FIBA ranking: 119 ▲1 (18 March 2026)
- Joined FIBA: 1992
- FIBA zone: FIBA Europe
- National federation: Georgian Basketball Federation

Olympic Games
- Appearances: None

World Cup
- Appearances: None

EuroBasket
- Appearances: None
Home	Away

The Georgia women's national basketball team is the women's basketball side that represents the country of Georgia in international competitions. It is governed by the Georgian Basketball Federation.

The team for several times unsuccessfully tried to qualify for the EuroBasket.

== See also ==
- Georgia women's national under-18 basketball team
- Georgia women's national under-16 basketball team
