= 2016 FIBA Women's European Championship for Small Countries =

Tournament details
- Host country: Gibraltar
- Dates: 28 June – 3 July 2016
- Teams: 6 (from 1 confederation)
- Venue: 1 (in 1 host city)

Final positions
- Champions: Malta (3rd title)
- Runners-up: Ireland
- Third place: Moldova

Official website
- www.fiba.basketball

The 2016 FIBA Women's European Championship for Small Countries was the 14th edition of this tournament. It took place in Gibraltar from 28 June to 3 July 2016.

Malta won their third title in this event by beating Ireland in the final, 67–59.

== Teams ==
Six countries will join the tournament:

- Andorra
- Gibraltar
- Ireland

- Malta
- Moldova
- Wales

== Draw ==
The draw took place on 22 January 2016.

Pot 1	Pot 2	Pot 3
Malta; Wales	Gibraltar; Moldova	Andorra; Ireland

== Preliminary round ==
All times are CEST (UTC+2)

=== Group A ===
Pos	Team	Pld	W	L	PF	PA	PD	Pts	Qualification
1	Ireland	2	2	0	161	96	+65	4	Semifinals
2	Moldova	2	1	1	120	129	−9	3	Quarterfinals
3	Wales	2	0	2	95	151	−56	2	Quarterfinals

Source: FIBA

28 June
16:00

Boxscore

Ireland	84–43	Wales
Scoring by quarter: 19–17, 22–12, 25–8, 18–6
Pts: Woods 19; Rebs: McDermott 10; Asts: McKenna 5		Pts: Shanahan 12; Rebs: Wagstaff 7 Asts: Shanahan 2

Tercentenary Sports Hall, Gibraltar
Referees: Antonio Conde (ESP), Alessandro Martolini (ITA), Mariann Miklosik (SCO)

29 June
16:00

Boxscore

Moldova	53–77	Ireland
Scoring by quarter: 15–19, 12–27, 15–16, 11–15
Pts: Burlacova 14; Rebs: Gavrilita 9 Asts: Gavrilita 3		Pts: O'Leary 12; Rebs: Dwyer 7 Asts: O'Leary 6

Tercentenary Sports Hall, Gibraltar
Referees: Haydn Jones (WAL), Marek Maliszewski (POL), Antonio Zamora (AND)

30 June
16:00

Boxscore

Wales	52–67	Moldova
Scoring by quarter: 10–13, 7–13, 21–14, 14–27
Pts: Curson, Wagstaff 16; Rebs: four players 6 Asts: Shanahan 6		Pts: Gavrilita 25; Rebs: Burlacova 13; Asts: Burlacova, Gavrilita 3

Tercentenary Sports Hall, Gibraltar
Referees: Ilija Belošević (SRB), Samira Barrima (POR), Mariann Miklosik (SCO)

=== Group B ===
Pos	Team	Pld	W	L	PF	PA	PD	Pts	Qualification
1	Malta	2	2	0	143	71	+72	4	Semifinals
2	Andorra	2	1	1	96	115	−19	3	Quarterfinals
3	Gibraltar	2	0	2	77	130	−53	2	Quarterfinals

Source: FIBA

28 June
18:30

Boxscore

Gibraltar	48–54	Andorra
Scoring by quarter: 14–9, 9–16, 11–11, 14–18
Pts: Moreno 23; Rebs: Gomez 11; Asts: Moreno 4		Pts: Bastida 15; Rebs: Vicente 9 Asts: Carmona 6

Tercentenary Sports Hall, Gibraltar
Referees: Ilija Belošević (SRB), Samira Barrima (POR), Haydn Jones (WAL)

29 June
18:30

Boxscore

Andorra	42–67	Malta
Scoring by quarter: 5–18, 18–11, 10–22, 9–16
Pts: Brunet, Nun 11; Rebs: Vicente 7 Asts: five players 1		Pts: Grima 11; Rebs: Vella 8 Asts: Grima 5

Tercentenary Sports Hall, Gibraltar
Referees: Carlos Santos (POR), Antonio Conde (ESP), Alessandro Martolini (ITA)

30 June
18:30

Boxscore

Malta	76–29	Gibraltar
Scoring by quarter: 16–5, 20–7, 19–8, 21–9
Pts: De Martino 20; Rebs: Grima 13; Asts: Brincat 4		Pts: Moreno 12; Rebs: Moreno 8 Asts: six players 1

Tercentenary Sports Hall, Gibraltar
Referees: Carlos Santos (POR), Marek Maliszewski (POL), Antonio Zamora (AND)

== Final round ==
Quarterfinals
1 July
Andorra	55
Wales	48
1 July
Moldova	75
Gibraltar	49

Semifinals
2 July
Ireland	86
Andorra	45
2 July
Malta	90
Moldova	30

Final
3 July
Ireland	59
Malta	67
Third place
3 July
Andorra	50
Moldova	66

=== Quarterfinals ===
1 July
16:00

Boxscore

Andorra	55–48	Wales
Scoring by quarter: 20–17, 9–17, 17–6, 9–8
Pts: Brunet 18; Rebs: Vicente 12; Asts: Brunet, Carmona 3		Pts: Shanahan 13; Rebs: Curson 9 Asts: Shanahan 6

Tercentenary Sports Hall, Gibraltar
Referees: Ilija Belošević (SRB), Marek Maliszewski (POL), Mariann Miklosik (SCO)

1 July
18:30

Boxscore

Moldova	75–49	Gibraltar
Scoring by quarter: 29–6, 17–14, 17–17, 12–12
Pts: Burlacova 17; Rebs: Căuşan 10; Asts: Căuşan 8		Pts: Moreno 16; Rebs: De la Chica 7 Asts: Moreno 3

Tercentenary Sports Hall, Gibraltar
Referees: Alessandro Martolini (ITA), Samira Barrima (POR), Antonio Zamora (AND)

=== Semifinals ===
2 July
16:00

Boxscore

Malta	90–30	Moldova
Scoring by quarter: 25–10, 30–6, 19–6, 16–8
Pts: De Martino 25; Rebs: Pace 9 Asts: Pace 7		Pts: Gavrilita 10; Rebs: Sadskaia 7 Asts: Sureadnova 1

Tercentenary Sports Hall, Gibraltar
Referees: Antonio Conde (ESP), Haydn Jones (WAL), Marek Maliszewski (POL)

2 July
18:30

Boxscore

Ireland	86–45	Andorra
Scoring by quarter: 24–16, 19–9, 22–6, 21–14
Pts: McDermott 17; Rebs: McDermott 12; Asts: Rockall 5		Pts: Brunet 10; Rebs: Vicente 8 Asts: Brunet 2

Tercentenary Sports Hall, Gibraltar
Referees: Ilija Belošević (SRB), Mariann Miklosik (SCO), Carlos Santos (POR)

=== Fifth place game ===
3 July
12:00

Boxscore

Gibraltar	61–47	Wales
Scoring by quarter: 14–11, 14–16, 14–7, 19–13
Pts: Reyes 23; Rebs: Reyes 11; Asts: Moreno 4		Pts: Curson 11; Rebs: Curson 15; Asts: Wagstaff 5

Tercentenary Sports Hall, Gibraltar
Referees: Alessandro Martolini (ITA), Samira Barrima (POR), Antonio Zamora (AND)

=== Third place game ===
3 July
16:00

Boxscore

Andorra	50–66	Moldova
Scoring by quarter: 17–18, 8–14, 9–10, 16–24
Pts: Brunet 21; Rebs: Pla, Vicente 7 Asts: Carmona 4		Pts: Gavrilita 25; Rebs: Verbitcaia 12; Asts: Verbitcaia 5

Tercentenary Sports Hall, Gibraltar
Referees: Haydn Jones (WAL), Marek Maliszewski (POL), Mariann Miklosik (SCO)

=== Final ===
3 July
18:30

Boxscore

Ireland	59–67	Malta
Scoring by quarter: 27–19, 12–10, 11–22, 9–16
Pts: Rockall 14; Rebs: Rockall 9 Asts: Rockall 4		Pts: De Martino 16; Rebs: Vella 10; Asts: Pace 5

Tercentenary Sports Hall, Gibraltar
Referees: Ilija Belošević (SRB), Carlos Santos (POR), Antonio Zamora (AND)

2016 FIBA Women's European Championship
for Small Countries winner

Malta
3rd title

== Final ranking ==
Rank	Team	Record
1st place, gold medalist(s)	Malta	4–0
2nd place, silver medalist(s)	Ireland	3–1
3rd place, bronze medalist(s)	Moldova	3–2
4	Andorra	2–3
5	Gibraltar	1–3
6	Wales	0–4
