= KB Apolonia =

- Leagues: Albanian Basketball Superliga; Albanian Cup
- Founded: 1925
- Arena: Fier Sports Palace
- Capacity: 1,000
- Location: Fier Rruga Skenderbeu, Albania
- Team colors: Green, White
- Head coach: Aldi Gërmau
| Home | Away |

KB Apolonia is an Albanian basketball team that plays in the Albanian Basketball Superliga, the highest division in the Albanian Basketball League, and in the Albanian Cup.

== History ==
The club was founded in 1925 as part of the multi disciplinary KS Apolonia. Apolonia made their debut in the 2022–23 Liga Unike on the 17 November 2022 against KB Prizreni.
