= Norway women's national basketball team =

Norway
- FIBA ranking: 65 ▲3 (18 March 2026)
- Joined FIBA: 1968
- FIBA zone: FIBA Europe
- National federation: NBBF
- Coach: Gunnar Nesbo

Olympic Games
- Appearances: None

World Cup
- Appearances: None

EuroBasket
- Appearances: None

Championship for Small Countries
- Appearances: 1
- Medals: None
| Home | Away |

The Norway women's national basketball team represents Norway in international women's basketball competition. The national team is controlled by the Norwegian Basketball Federation (NBBF). The Norway women's national team played at the 2018 FIBA Women's European Championship for Small Countries, and finished the tournament in fourth place.
