= Denmark women's national basketball team =

Denmark
- FIBA ranking: 56 ▲3 (18 March 2026)
- Joined FIBA: 1951
- FIBA zone: FIBA Europe
- National federation: DBBF
- Coach: Jesper Krone

Olympic Games
- Appearances: None

World Cup
- Appearances: None

EuroBasket Women
- Appearances: 3
- Medals: None
Home	Away

The Denmark women's national basketball team represents Denmark in international women's basketball competition. The team is controlled by the Danish Basketball Association (DBBF).

== See also ==
- Denmark women's national under-19 basketball team
- Denmark women's national under-17 basketball team
- Denmark women's national 3x3 team
