= Armenia women's national basketball team =

Armenia
- FIBA ranking: 88 (18 March 2026)
- Joined FIBA: 1991
- FIBA zone: FIBA Europe
- National federation: BFA

Championship for Small Countries
- Appearances: 3
- Medals: (1) 2010

The Armenia women's national basketball team represents Armenia in international women's basketball competitions. The women's national team is directed by the Basketball Federation of Armenia.

== Competitive record ==
=== Women's European Championship for Small Countries ===
Year	Position	Pld	W	L
(Austria) 1998	7th	5	2	3
(Andorra) 2004	Fourth place	5	3	2
(Armenia) 2010	Runner-up	5	4	1
Total		15	9	6

== See also ==
- Sport in Armenia
