= Scotland women's national basketball team =

Scotland
- Joined FIBA: 1947
- FIBA zone: FIBA Europe
- National federation: basketballscotland

Olympic Games
- Appearances: -
- Medals: -

World Cup
- Appearances: -
- Medals: -

FIBA EuroBasket Women
- Appearances: 1 (1956)
- Medals: -
Home	Away

The Scotland women's national basketball team represents the Scotland in international women's basketball competitions but has not been active in international competitions since 2017.

Scotland's current women's national basketball teams compete in U15 and U14 competitions, as well as 3x3 tournaments at the U16 level.

== Competitions ==
=== Olympic Games ===
Year	Round	Position	Pld	W	L
1976-2024	Did not qualify				
(United States) 2028	To be determined				
Total	0 Titles	0	0	0	0

=== World Championship ===
Year	Round	Position	Pld	W	L
1971-2014	Did not qualify				
(Spain) 2018	To be determined				
Total	0 Titles	0	0	0	0

=== EuroBasket ===
Year	Round	Position	Pld	W	L
1950-1954	Did not qualify				
(Czech Republic) 1956	Preliminary round	16th	8	0	8
1956-2021	Did not qualify				
Total	0 Titles	1/33	8	0	8
