= Austria women's national basketball team =

Austria
- FIBA ranking: 75 ▼2 (14 September 2026)
- Joined FIBA: 1934
- FIBA zone: FIBA Europe
- National federation: ÖBV
- Coach: Mike Kress

Olympic Games
- Appearances: None

World Cup
- Appearances: None

EuroBasket
- Appearances: 7
- Medals: None
Home	Away

The Austria women's national basketball team represents Austria in international women's basketball competition. The team is controlled by the Austrian Basketball Federation.

== Competitions ==
=== EuroBasket ===
Year	Position	Pld	W	L
(Italy) 1938	did not qualify			
(Hungary) 1950	10th Place	7	2	5
(Soviet Union) 1952	9th Place	5	1	4
(Socialist Federal Republic of Yugoslavia) 1954	8th Place	6	2	4
(Czech Republic) 1956	8th Place	8	2	6
(Poland) 1958	8th Place	5	0	5
1958–1970	did not qualify			
(Netherlands) 1970	10th Place	7	2	5
(Bulgaria) 1972	12th Place	8	0	8
1972–2025	did not qualify			
(Belgium) (Finland) (Sweden) (Lithuania) 2027	to be determined			
Total		46	9	37

== See also ==
- Austria men's national basketball team
- Austria women's national under-19 basketball team
- Austria women's national under-17 basketball team
- Austria women's national 3x3 team
