= Wales women's national basketball team =

Wales
- FIBA zone: FIBA Europe
- National federation: Basketball Wales

Olympic Games
- Appearances: None

World Championships
- Appearances: None

FIBA EuroBasket Women
- Appearances: None

Championship for Small Countries
- Appearances: 2
Home	Away

The Wales women's national basketball team is the national basketball team of Wales and is governed by the Basketball Wales.

== See also ==
- Wales national under-17 basketball team
- Wales national 3x3 team
