= Cyprus women's national basketball team =

Cyprus
- FIBA ranking: 76 ▲5 (18 March 2026)
- Joined FIBA: 1974
- FIBA zone: FIBA Europe
- National federation: Κυπριακή Ομοσπονδία Καλαθοσφαίρισης (CBF)
- Coach: Kalia Papadopoulou

World Cup
- Appearances: None

EuroBasket Women
- Appearances: None

Championship for Small Countries
- Appearances: 9
- Medals: (bronze) Bronze: (1993, 1998, 2002)
Home	Away

The Cyprus women's national basketball team represents Cyprus in international women's basketball competitions. The team is administered by the Cyprus Basketball Federation. The Cyprus women's national team has appeared at the FIBA Women's European Championship for Small Countries nine times overall.

== See also ==
- Cyprus women's national under-18 basketball team
- Cyprus women's national under-16 basketball team
