= Luxembourg women's national basketball team =

Luxembourg
- FIBA ranking: 52 ▲2 (18 March 2026)
- Joined FIBA: 1946
- FIBA zone: FIBA Europe
- National federation: Luxembourg Basketball Federation (FLBB)
- Coach: Mariusz Dziurdzia

Olympic Games
- Appearances: None

World Cup
- Appearances: None

EuroBasket
- Appearances: None

Championship for Small Countries
- Appearances: 10
- Medals: (gold) Gold: (2006, 2021); (silver) Silver: (1998, 2004, 2018); (bronze) Bronze: (1989, 1996, 2008)
Home	Away

The Luxembourg women's national basketball team represents Luxembourg in international women's basketball tournaments. The national team is controlled by the Luxembourg Basketball Federation. The Luxembourg women's national team played at the 2018 FIBA Women's European Championship for Small Countries, and won the silver medal.
