= Malta women's national basketball team =

Malta
- FIBA ranking: 82 ▼3 (18 March 2026)
- Joined FIBA: 1967
- FIBA zone: FIBA Europe
- National federation: Malta Basketball Association

Championship for Small Countries
- Appearances: 14
- Medals: (4) 2008, 2010, 2016, 2026 (1) 2024 (5) 2004, 2012, 2014, 2018, 2022

The Malta women's national basketball team represents the Malta in international women's basketball competitions.

== Competitions ==
=== Small Countries ===
Year	Pos	Pld	W	L
(Luxembourg) 1989	7th	5	2	3
(Malta) 1996	5th	5	3	2
(Austria) 1998	5th	5	3	2
(North Macedonia) 2000	4th	4	1	3
(Andorra) 2002	6th	4	1	3
(Andorra) 2004	3rd	5	4	1
(Malta) 2006	4th	5	2	3
(Luxembourg) 2008	1st	5	5	0
(Armenia) 2010	1st	4	4	0
(North Macedonia) 2012	3rd	5	4	1
(Austria) 2014	3rd	4	2	2
(Gibraltar) 2016	1st	4	4	0
(Republic of Ireland) 2018	3rd	5	3	2
(Cyprus) 2021	4th	4	1	3
(Cyprus) 2022	3rd	4	2	2
(Kosovo) 2024	2nd	5	4	1
(Kosovo) 2026	1st	4	4	0
Total		77	49	28

== See also ==
- Malta women's national under-18 basketball team
- Malta women's national under-16 basketball team
- Malta women's national 3x3 team
