= Gibraltar women's national basketball team =

Gibraltar
- FIBA ranking: 111 (18 March 2026)
- Joined FIBA: 1985
- FIBA zone: FIBA Europe
- National federation: Gibraltar Amateur Basketball Association

Championship for Small Countries
- Appearances: 16
- Medals: None

The Gibraltar women's national basketball team represents Gibraltar in international women's women's basketball competitions. It is administered by the Gibraltar Amateur Basketball Association. The team participated at every FIBA Women's European Championship for Small Countries since its establishment in 1989.

== See also ==
- Gibraltar men's national basketball team
- Gibraltar women's national under-18 basketball team
- Gibraltar women's national under-16 basketball team
