= List of EuroBasket Women winning head coaches =

The list of EuroBasket Women winning head coaches shows all of the head coaches that have won the EuroBasket Women, which is the main international competition for senior women's basketball national teams that is governed by FIBA Europe, the European zone within the International Basketball Federation (FIBA).

== Key ==
(2)	Number of titles
†	Elected into the Naismith Memorial Basketball Hall of Fame as a coach
*	Elected into the FIBA Hall of Fame as coach
† *	Member of both the FIBA Hall of Fame and the Naismith Memorial Basketball Hall of Fame.

== List ==
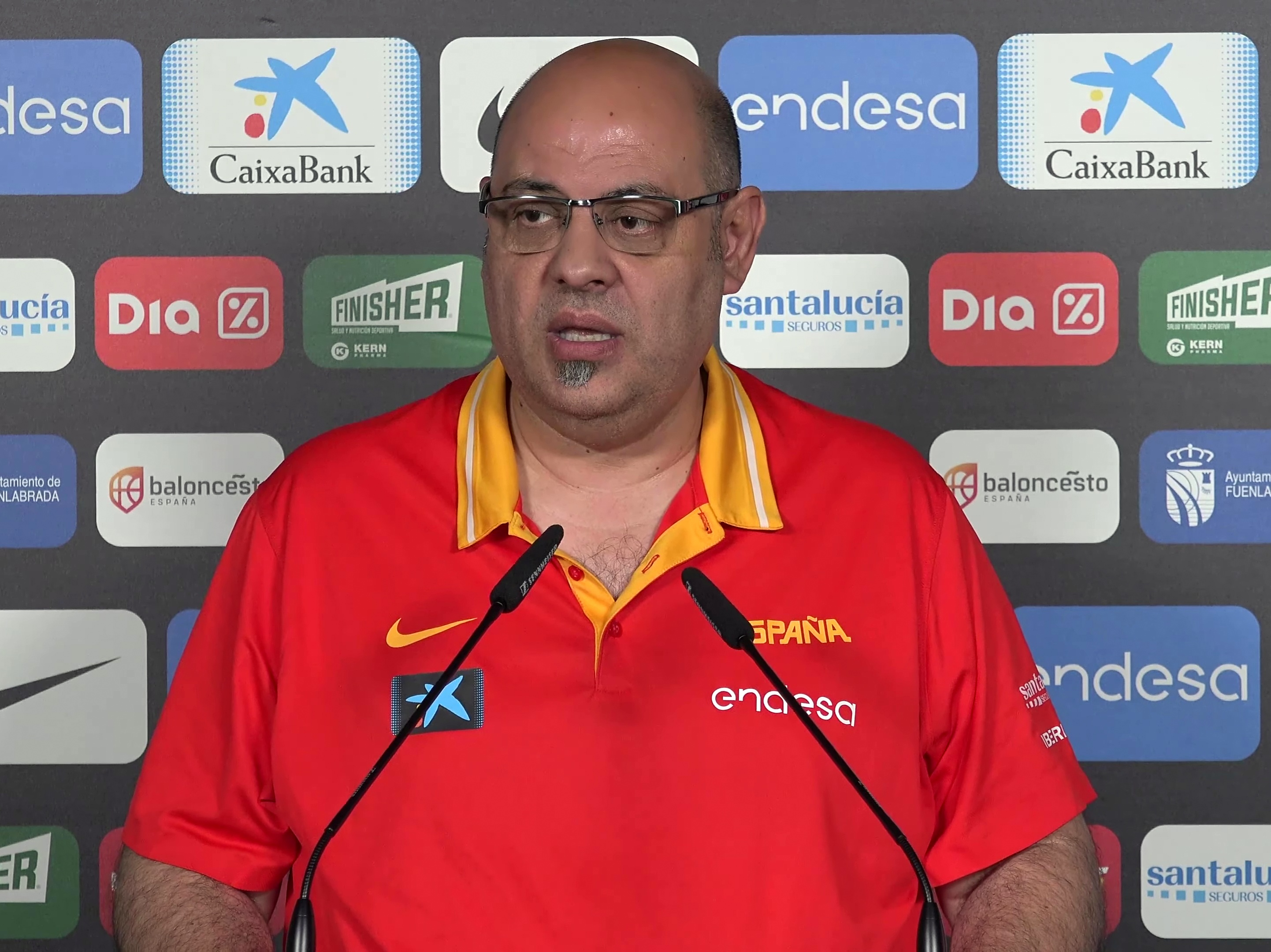
Spanish coach Lucas Mondelo won three titles in his career.

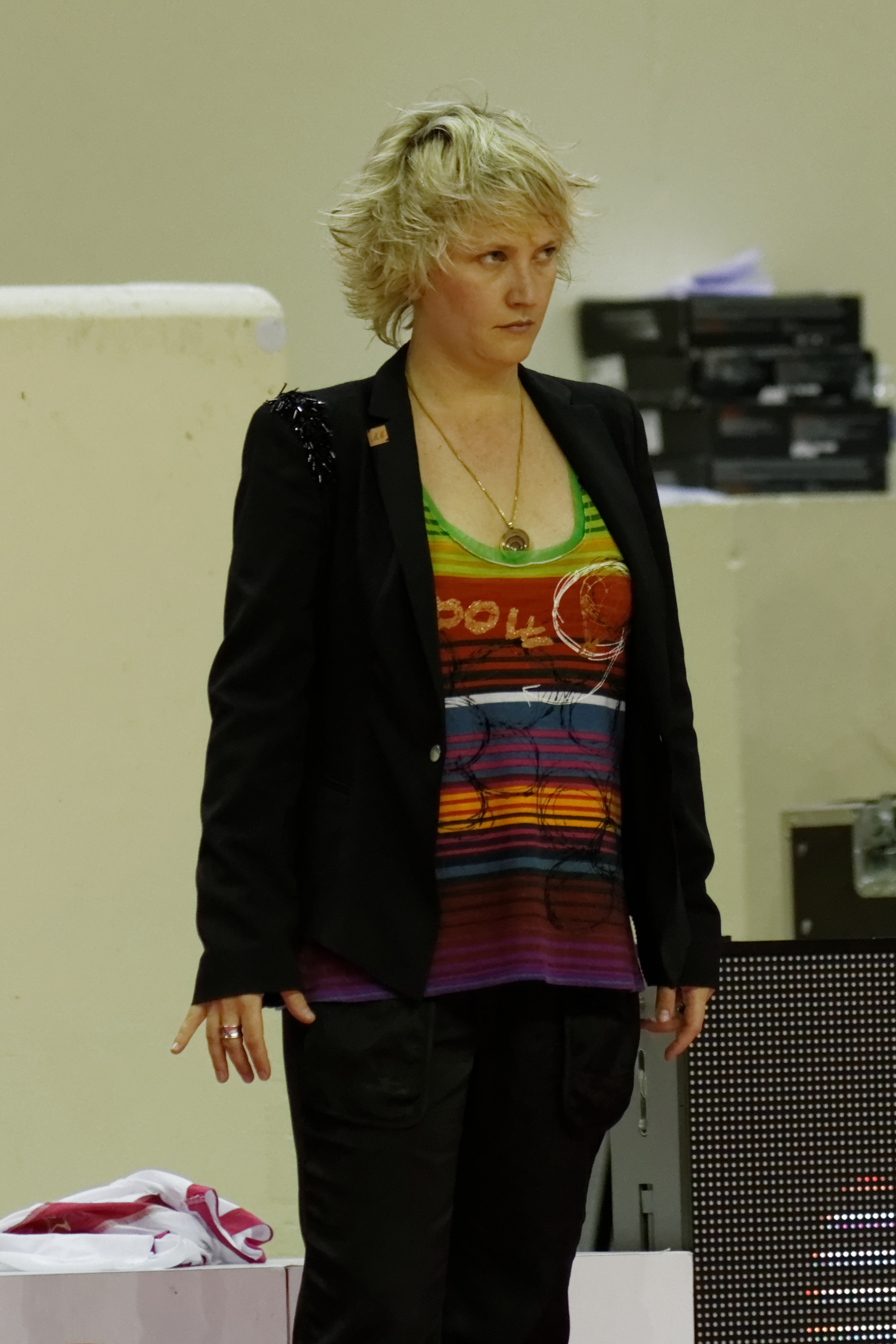
Serbian coach Marina Maljković won the title two times in her career.

Year	Head coach	National team	Ref.
1938	(Italy) Silvio Longhi	Italy	
1950	(Soviet Union) Konstantin Travin	Soviet Union	
1952	(Soviet Union) Konstantin Travin (2)	Soviet Union	
1954	(Soviet Union) Vladimir Gorokhov	Soviet Union	
1956	(Soviet Union) Vladimir Gorokhov (2)	Soviet Union	
1958	(Bulgaria) Dimitar Mitev	Bulgaria	
1960	(Soviet Union) Stepas Butautas	Soviet Union	
1962	(Soviet Union) Lidiya Alekseyeva†*	Soviet Union	
1964	(Soviet Union) Lidiya Alekseyeva†* (2)	Soviet Union	
1966	(Soviet Union) Lidiya Alekseyeva†* (3)	Soviet Union	
1968	(Soviet Union) Lidiya Alekseyeva†* (4)	Soviet Union	
1970	(Soviet Union) Lidiya Alekseyeva†* (5)	Soviet Union	
1972	(Soviet Union) Lidiya Alekseyeva†* (6)	Soviet Union	
1974	(Soviet Union) Lidiya Alekseyeva†* (7)	Soviet Union	
1976	(Soviet Union) Lidiya Alekseyeva†* (8)	Soviet Union	
1978	(Soviet Union) Lidiya Alekseyeva†* (9)	Soviet Union	
1980	(Soviet Union) Lidiya Alekseyeva†* (10)	Soviet Union	
1981	(Soviet Union) Lidiya Alekseyeva†* (11)	Soviet Union	
1983	(Soviet Union) Lidiya Alekseyeva†* (12)	Soviet Union	
1985	(Soviet Union) Vadim Kapranov	Soviet Union	
1987	(Soviet Union) Leonid Yachmenyov	Soviet Union	
1989	(Soviet Union) Evgeny Gomelsky*	Soviet Union	
1991	(Soviet Union) Evgeny Gomelsky* (2)	Soviet Union	
1993	(Spain) Manolo Coloma	Spain	
1995	(Ukraine) Volodymyr Ryzhov	Ukraine	
1997	(Lithuania) Vydas Gedvilas	Lithuania	
1999	(Poland) Tomasz Herkt	Poland	
2001	(France) Alain Jardel	France	
2003	(Russia) Vadim Kapranov (2)	Russia	
2005	(Czech Republic) Jan Bobrovský	Czech Republic	
2007	(Russia) Igor Grudin	Russia	
2009	(France) Pierre Vincent	France	
2011	(Russia) Boris Sokolovsky	Russia	
2013	(Spain) Lucas Mondelo	Spain	
2015	(Serbia) Marina Maljković	Serbia	
2017	(Spain) Lucas Mondelo (2)	Spain	
2019	(Spain) Lucas Mondelo (3)	Spain	
2021	(Serbia) Marina Maljković (2)	Serbia	
2023	(France) Rachid Meziane	Belgium	
2025	(United States) Mike Thibault	Belgium	

== Multiple winners ==
Number	Head coach	National team(s)	First	Last
12	(Soviet Union) Lidiya Alekseyeva	Soviet Union	1962	1983
3	(Spain) Lucas Mondelo	Spain	2013	2019
2	(Soviet Union) Konstantin Travin	Soviet Union	1950	1952
2	(Soviet Union) Vladimir Gorokhov	Soviet Union	1954	1956
2	(Soviet Union) Evgeny Gomelsky	Soviet Union	1989	1991
2	(Soviet Union) / (Russia) Vadim Kapranov	Soviet Union, Russia	1985	2003
2	(Serbia) Marina Maljković	Serbia	2015	2021

== See also ==
- List of FIBA EuroBasket winning head coaches
