= EuroBasket Women =

European basketball tournament for women's national teams

- Current season, competition or edition: EuroBasket Women 2027 qualification
- Sport: Basketball
- Founded: 1938; 88 years ago
- First season: 1938
- No. of teams: 16
- Countries: FIBA Europe member associations
- Continent: FIBA Europe (Europe)
- Most recent champion: Belgium (2nd title)
- Most titles: Soviet Union (21 titles)
- Related competitions: FIBA Women's European Championship for Small Countries; EuroBasket
- Website: Women's EuroBasket; FIBA Europe

EuroBasket Women is a biennial international women's basketball competition held between the nations of FIBA Europe for women's national teams. EuroBasket Women is also used as a qualifying tournament for the FIBA Women's World Cup and also the Olympic Games.

== History ==
The first tournament was held in 1938 in Fascist Italy, with participation of only five national teams. Despite losing to Lithuania (21–23), the host team won all other matches and captured the inaugural title thanks to better head-to-head point difference among Top 3 teams. Lithuania and Poland took silver and bronze medals respectively.

The Second World War (1939–1945), which began the following year, interrupted the organization of women's basketball tournaments for a long time. The next continental championship was held in Hungary only 12 years later, in 1950. From 1950 to 1980, women's championships were held biennially each even year – unlike men's European Basketball Championship which were held each odd year. This tournament marked beginning of the era of dominance of the Eastern European teams which lasted for next four decades. In the last and decisive match of the final round hosts met with Soviet team. Hungary led after first half (24–22), but in the second half Soviets players looked much better. They managed to achieve victory (45–32) and to won its maiden European title. Czechoslovakia took bronze medals. At the next European Championship which was held in Moscow in 1952, Soviet team proved own dominance by beating Czechoslovakia and Hungary with margin of 23 points (52–29) and 30 points respectively (71–41). Two years later in Yugoslavia, Soviet team captured European title for third time by beating Czechoslovakia with margin of 7 points (69–62) in a decisive match of the final round. Bulgaria took bronze European Championship medals for first time. On the next tournament which was held in Czechoslovakia in 1956, Soviet team took gold medals for fourth time in a row by beating Hungarians in the final match (49–41) while hosts took bronze.

1958 European Championships which was held in Łódź, Poland became remarkable event. Soviet Union, the winner of four previous tournaments, lost European title for first time. In the decisive match of final round, Bulgaria led by Vanya Voynova managed to beat Soviet team in overtime (54–51) and to break Soviet dominance. This victory was remarkable – it's enough to say that this defeat (alongside with Soviet defeat to United States at the 1957 World Championship) remained the only two defeats in the history of participation of Soviet team at all international basketball competitions during very long time – till 1986. Next year Soviet Union took revenge by beating Bulgaria in the decisive match of the 1959 World Championship which was held in Moscow (51–38). The next European Championship was held in 1960 in Sofia, Bulgaria. Soviet team returned European title although this victory was more difficult. They achieved victory over Czechoslovakia (future bronze medalists) with margin of just two points (58–56). In the decisive match of final round, Soviet team again met with Bulgaria. After first half, Bulgarians led with margin of 9 points (22–13). However, in second half Soviet players managed to equal score and then achieve victory in overtime (52–50). Last 5 minutes and overtime of this match were played in an indoor hall of the National Stadium due to rain. Two years later European Championship was held in France. At the group round, Soviet Union defeated Czechoslovakia only in overtime (51–49). Later both teams reached final match where Soviet team won with a bigger advantage (63–46). At the next 1964 European Championships which was held in Hungary, Soviet team won third title in a row by beating Bulgaria in the final match with margin of just two points (55–53). Two years later at the 1966 European Championships in Romania, Soviet team won over Czechoslovakia in a final match (74–66).

1968 European Championships which was held in Italy became debut for legendary center Uļjana (Iulijaka) Semjonova. This giant 2.10-meter tall player played key role in Soviet team for next 18 years. From 1968 to 1985, she played at 10 European Championships and always won gold. Before Semjonova's debut, the vast majority of decisive matches were ended with favour of Soviet team but with relatively close margin. With Semjonova in the squad, the superiority of Soviet Union over opponents became overwhelming. Other prominent European basketball national teams at that time, such as Czechoslovakia, Bulgaria or Hungary were huge step behind the Soviet Union. Soviet team played 74 games during these 10 tournaments, and the slimmest margin of victory was 16 points. Another architect of the success of Soviet basketball was Lidiya Alekseyeva (1924–2014) who took direct participation in 16 Soviet victories at the European Championships – firstly as team captain (4 titles from 1950 to 1956), then as assistant coach (1962) and later as a head coach of national team (record 11 titles from 1964 to 1983). Soviet team was unbeaten not only in Europe, but also in the world. From 1959 to 1985, Soviet Union won all international competitions in which they participated without losing any match - 14 European Championships, 6 World Championships (1959, 1964, 1967, 1971, 1975 and 1983) and 2 Olympic tournaments (1976 and 1980).

After the 1980 Olympic Games and 1980 European Championships, it was decided to hold women's continental tournament biennially each odd year – just like men's European Basketball Championship. Soviet team continued to win but in late 1980s, as a result of changing of generation, their superiority became not such overwhelming as it was before. In 1986 they suffered first defeats at international competition for 28 years - at first, they lost to United States at the decisive match of the 1986 Goodwill Games with margin of 23 points (60–83) and next month they lost to US team with margin of 20 points (88–108) in the final match of home World Championship (both matches were played in Moscow). Nevertheless, Soviet team continued to dominate at European area. They won 1987 European Championship held in Spain after beating Czechoslovakia (89–81) in semifinals and Yugoslavia (83–73) in the final match. But next year at the 1988 Summer Olympics in Seoul, South Korea, Yugoslavia managed to perform better - they took silver medals by losing just 7 points to US team in the final match (70–77) while Soviet team surprisingly failed to reach final and unexpectively finished only at third place for first time in their history. At the group round of the 1989 European Championship held in Bulgaria, Soviet team defeated Czechoslovakia and Netherlands with margin of just 3 points (78–75 and 59–56 respectively) and then reached final where defeated Czechoslovakia once again with same margin (64–61). But at the 1990 World Championship in Malaysia, Soviet Union lost in the second group round to Czechoslovakia (79–82) and Yugoslavia (63–64) and finished only at fifth place. It was first and only time when Soviet team failed to reach podium at the international competition where they participated. Like two years ago, Yugoslavia took silver medals after losing to US in the final match (78–88).

At the next 1991 European Championship held in Israel, Yugoslavia managed to beat Soviet team at the group round (75–74). It was only second defeat of Soviet Union at the continental championships and the first since 1958. Despite this defeat, Soviet team reached final match where met with Yugoslavia once again. In this final, Yugoslavia led with margin of 14 points after first half (53–39), but in the second half Soviet players managed to change situation and won match with margin of 13 points (97–84). It was last participation of Soviet team at the European Championships. The facts speak for itself: participation in 22 championships resulted in 21 titles as European Champions, 151 matches and 149 wins (the only two defeats: in overtime to Bulgaria in 1958 and one-point defeat by Yugoslavia in 1991), including 114 consecutive wins between 1958 and 1991. Next year the former Soviet players who completed for Unified Team at the 1992 Summer Olympics in Barcelona, Spain as a result of Soviet Union's dissolution in December 1991, managed to achieve surprising success after shocking victory over United States in semifinals (79–73) and victory over China in the final match (76–66). There was last participation of Soviet basketball at the international competitions and true "true swan song" of Soviet team which ceased to exist after that.

During four decades, vast majority of the European Championships ended with very predictable results - Soviet Union took gold medals while silver and bronze medals went to other Eastern European teams. However, in early 1990s situation totally changed after dissolution of Soviet Union, SFR Yugoslavia and Czechoslovakia. It opened way for the success of other national teams and made European Championships much less predictable. At the 1993 European Championships which was held in Italy, Slovakia took bronze medals and became only newly formed national team who managed to reach podium. For the first time, two Western European teams played in the final match – Spain took their maiden European title by beating France (63–53). It's remarkable that not one of medalists reached the podium at the next 1995 European Championships which was held in Czech Republic. Led by Olympic Champions Maryna Tkachenko and Olena Zhyrko, Ukraine became the first post-Soviet national team to win European title after victories over Russia in semifinals (69–64) and over Italy in the final match (77–66). Russian team also took podium after beating Slovakia in the bronze medal match (69–50). 1997 European Championships became successful for Lithuania who beat Slovakia in the final match (72–62) while Germany took bronze medals and reached podium for first time after the German reunification. Two years later Poland achieved their maiden success at the home 1999 European Championships by beating France in the final match (59–56) while Russia took bronze medals. In 2001 France also won maiden European title at home championship after victory over Russia in the final match (73–68).

The next two tournaments finished by final matches between Russia and Czech Republic. In 2003, Russia won with score 59–56 and achieved their first European title after dissolution of Soviet Union. In 2005, Czech Republic took revenge (72–70) and also achieved their maiden trophy while Spain won bronze medals for third time in a row. Two years later Russia won European title for second time after victory over Spain in the final match (74–68) while Belarus took bronze medals and reached podium for first time. In 2009, France defeated Russia in the final match (57–53) and became European Champions for second time while Spain finished 3rd. Two years later Russia won European Championship for third time by beating Turkey women's national basketball team in the final match (59–42). Nevertheless, it was first European medals for Turkish team. France won bronze medals. At next four European Championship, French team reach final matches but lost all four matches. In 2013 at the home championship, they lost final to Spanish team with margin of just one point (69–70). In 2015, French players lost final match to Serbia who won European title for first time. 2017 and 2019 finals were ended in favour of Spain who defeated France (71–55 and 86–66 respectively) thus becoming first national team since 1991 years who managed to defend their own European title. The next 2021 European Championship was co-hosted by France and Spain. It was won by Serbia – for second time in history. France lost final match for fifth time in a row (54–63) while Belgium finished in third place.

In 2023, Belgium, called "The Belgian Cats", won their maiden trophy after victory over Spain in the final match (64–58) while France finished 3rd. In 2025, Belgium became back-to-back champions after another victory over Spain in the final match (67–65). This time Italy finished 3rd.

The 40 European Championship tournaments have been won by 12 different nations. The most successful nation is the now defunct Soviet Union with 21 titles. The other European Championship winners are Spain, with four titles; Russia, with three titles; Belgium, France and Serbia, with two titles each; as well as Bulgaria, Czech Republic, Italy, Lithuania, Poland, and Ukraine, with one title each.

== Results ==
#	Year	Host	Gold medal game			Bronze medal game			Teams
#	Year	Host	Gold	Score	Silver	Bronze	Score	Fourth place	Teams
1	1938; Details	Italy	Italy	Round-robin	Lithuania	Poland	Round-robin	France	5
–	~~1940~~	~~Lithuania~~ (probably)	Cancelled due to World War II			Cancelled due to World War II			–
2	1950; Details	Hungary	Soviet Union	Round-robin	Hungary	Czechoslovakia	Round-robin	France	12
3	1952; Details	Soviet Union	Soviet Union	Round-robin	Czechoslovakia	Hungary	Round-robin	Bulgaria	12
4	1954; Details	Yugoslavia	Soviet Union	Round-robin	Czechoslovakia	Bulgaria	Round-robin	Hungary	10
5	1956; Details	Czechoslovakia	Soviet Union	49–41	Hungary	Czechoslovakia	91–60	Bulgaria	16
6	1958; Details	Poland	Bulgaria	Round-robin	Soviet Union	Czechoslovakia	Round-robin	Yugoslavia	10
7	1960; Details	Bulgaria	Soviet Union	Round-robin	Bulgaria	Czechoslovakia	Round-robin	Poland	10
8	1962; Details	France	Soviet Union	63–46	Czechoslovakia	Bulgaria	48–36	Romania	10
9	1964; Details	Hungary	Soviet Union	55–53	Bulgaria	Czechoslovakia	68–47	Romania	10
10	1966; Details	Romania	Soviet Union	74–66	Czechoslovakia	East Germany	65–60	Romania	12
11	1968; Details	Italy	Soviet Union	Round-robin	Yugoslavia	Poland	Round-robin	East Germany	13
12	1970; Details	Netherlands	Soviet Union	94–33	France	Yugoslavia	77–66	Bulgaria	12
13	1972; Details	Bulgaria	Soviet Union	Round-robin	Bulgaria	Czechoslovakia	Round-robin	France	12
14	1974; Details	Italy	Soviet Union	Round-robin	Czechoslovakia	Italy	Round-robin	Hungary	13
15	1976; Details	France	Soviet Union	Round-robin	Czechoslovakia	Bulgaria	Round-robin	France	13
16	1978; Details	Poland	Soviet Union	Round-robin	Yugoslavia	Czechoslovakia	Round-robin	France	13
17	1980; Details	Yugoslavia	Soviet Union	95–49	Poland	Yugoslavia	61–57	Czechoslovakia	14
18	1981; Details	Italy	Soviet Union	85–42	Poland	Czechoslovakia	76–74	Yugoslavia	12
19	1983; Details	Hungary	Soviet Union	91–70	Bulgaria	Hungary	82–79	Yugoslavia	12
20	1985; Details	Italy	Soviet Union	103–69	Bulgaria	Hungary	103–76	Czechoslovakia	12
21	1987; Details	Spain	Soviet Union	83–73	Yugoslavia	Hungary	75–67	Czechoslovakia	12
22	1989; Details	Bulgaria	Soviet Union	64–61	Czechoslovakia	Bulgaria	79–69	Yugoslavia	8
23	1991; Details	Israel	Soviet Union	97–84	Yugoslavia	Hungary	65–61	Bulgaria	8
24	1993; Details	Italy	Spain	63–53	France	Slovakia	68–67	Italy	8
25	1995; Details	Czech Republic	Ukraine	77–66	Italy	Russia	69–50	Slovakia	14
26	1997; Details	Hungary	Lithuania	72–62	Slovakia	Germany	86–61	Hungary	12
27	1999; Details	Poland	Poland	59–56	France	Russia	78–49	Slovakia	12
28	2001; Details	France	France	73–68	Russia	Spain	89–74	Lithuania	12
29	2003; Details	Greece	Russia	59–56	Czech Republic	Spain	87–81	Poland	12
30	2005; Details	Turkey	Czech Republic	72–70	Russia	Spain	83–65	Lithuania	12
31	2007; Details	Italy	Russia	74–68	Spain	Belarus	72–63	Latvia	16
32	2009; Details	Latvia	France	57–53	Russia	Spain	63–56	Belarus	16
33	2011; Details	Poland	Russia	59–42	Turkey	France	63–56	Czech Republic	16
34	2013; Details	France	Spain	70–69	France	Turkey	92–71	Serbia	16
35	2015; Details	Hungary; Romania	Serbia	76–68	France	Spain	74–58	Belarus	20
36	2017; Details	Czech Republic	Spain	71–55	France	Belgium	78–45	Greece	16
37	2019; Details	Latvia; Serbia	Spain	86–66	France	Serbia	81–55	Great Britain	16
38	2021; Details	France; Spain	Serbia	63–54	France	Belgium	77–69	Belarus	16
39	2023; Details	Israel; Slovenia	Belgium	64–58	Spain	France	82–68	Hungary	16
40	2025; Details	Czech Republic; Germany; Greece; Italy	Belgium	67–65	Spain	Italy	69–54	France	16
41	2027; Details	Belgium; Finland; Lithuania; Sweden							16
42	2029; Details	Finland; Luxembourg; Switzerland; TBD							16

== Medal table ==
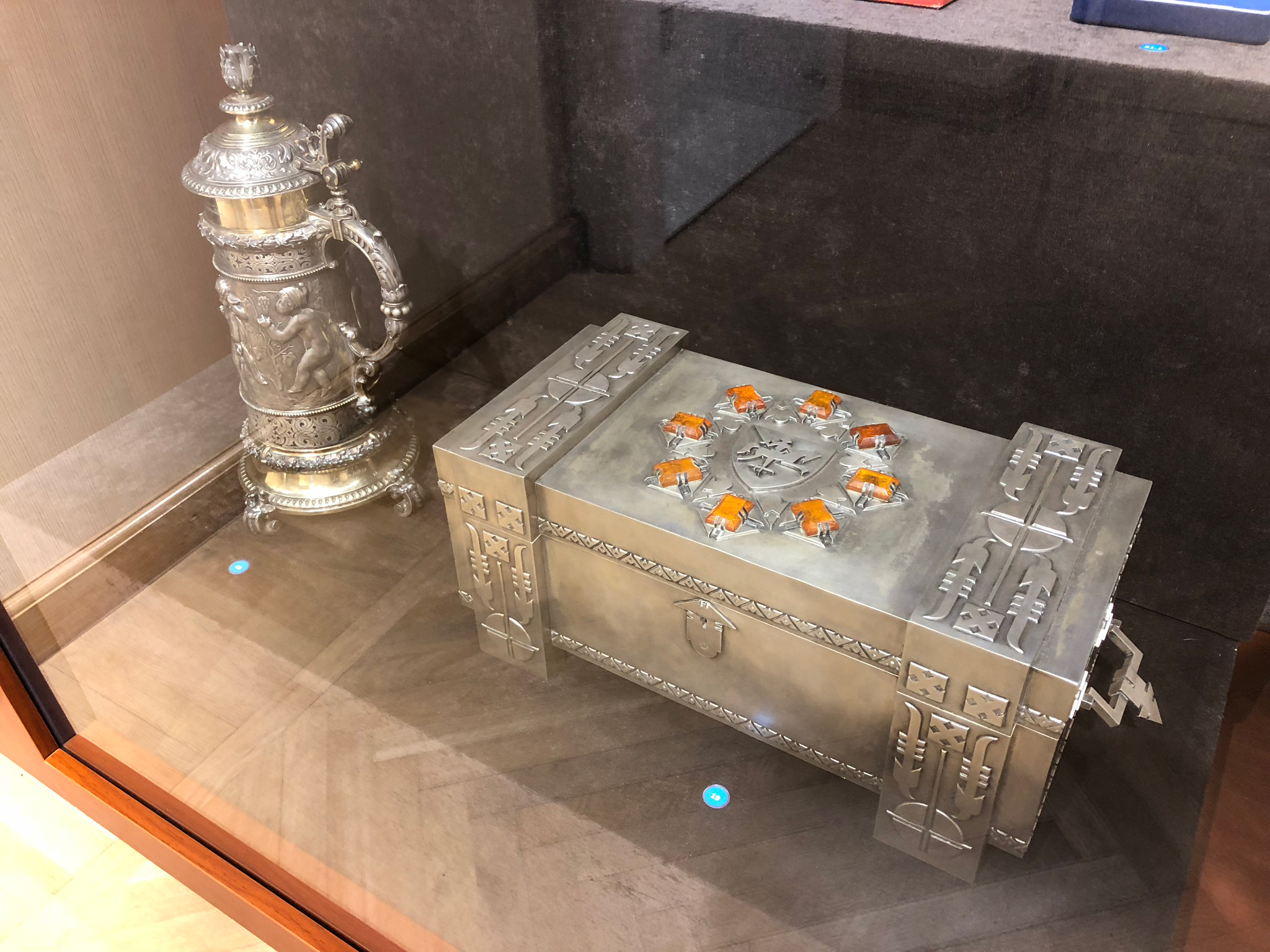
EuroBasket Women 1938 and EuroBasket 1939 Men trophies

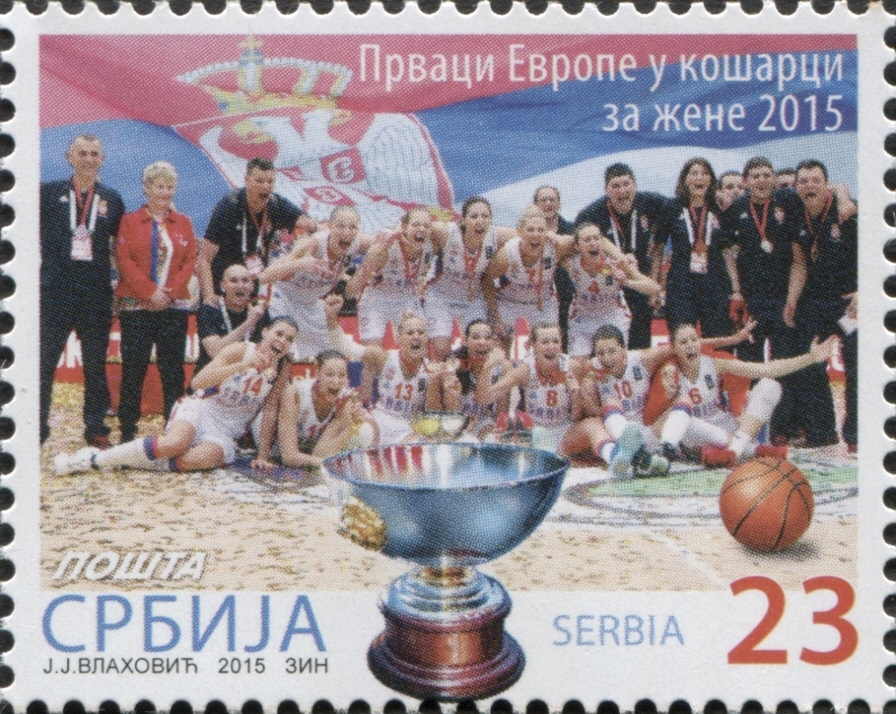
Former women's EuroBasket trophy

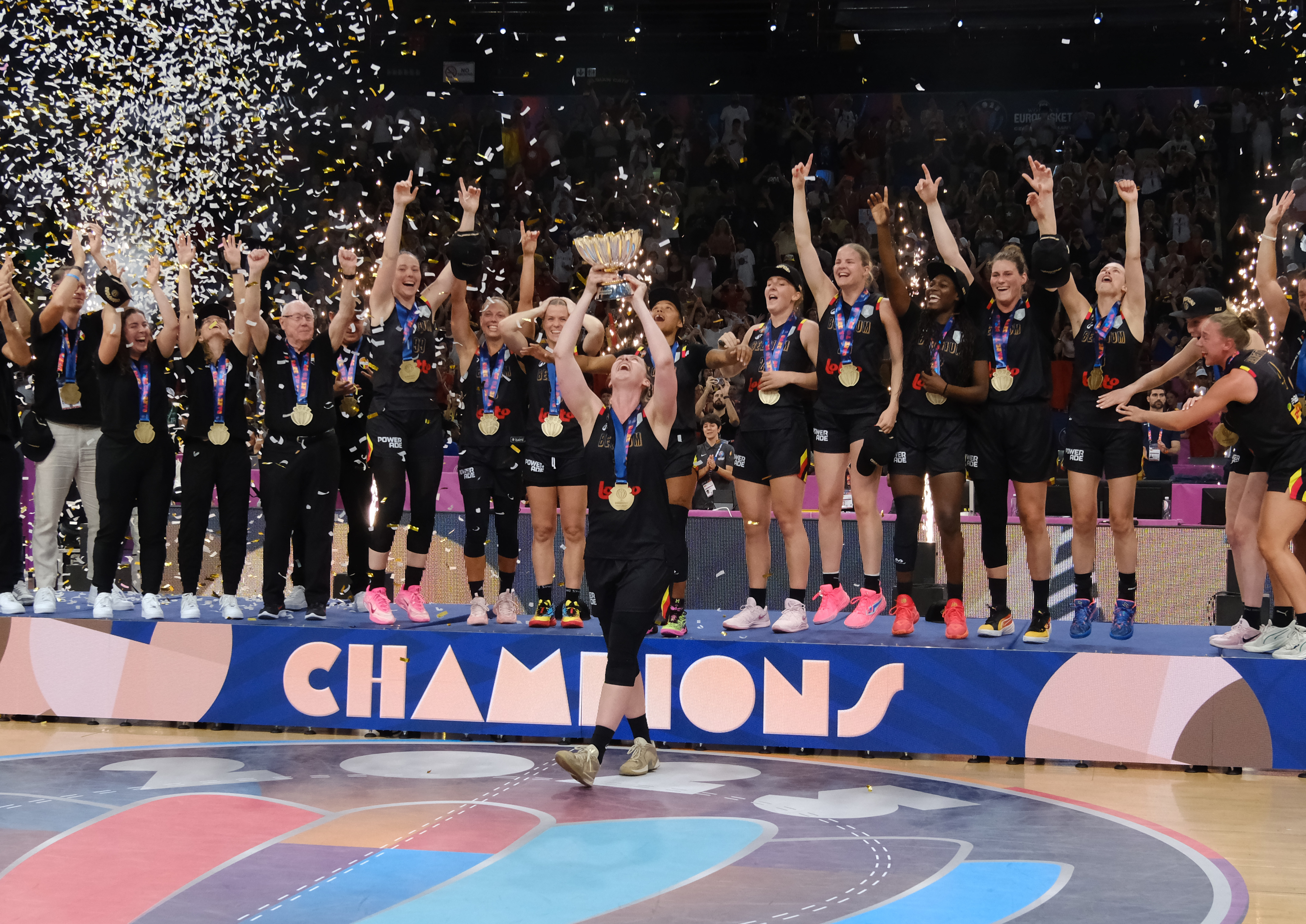
Women's EuroBasket trophy

Countries in italics no longer compete at the European Championships.

Rank	Nation	Gold	Silver	Bronze	Total
1	Soviet Union	21	1	0	22
2	Spain	4	3	5	12
3	Russia	3	3	2	8
4	France	2	8	2	12
5	Belgium	2	0	2	4
6	Serbia	2	0	1	3
7	Bulgaria	1	5	4	10
8	Poland	1	2	2	5
9	Italy	1	1	2	4
10	Czech Republic	1	1	0	2
10	Lithuania	1	1	0	2
12	Ukraine	1	0	0	1
13	Czechoslovakia	0	7	8	15
14	Yugoslavia	0	4	2	6
15	Hungary	0	2	5	7
16	Slovakia	0	1	1	2
16	Turkey	0	1	1	2
18	Belarus	0	0	1	1
18	East Germany	0	0	1	1
18	Germany	0	0	1	1
Totals (20 entries)		40	40	40	120

== Participating nations ==
Nation	(Italy) 1938	(Hungary) 1950	(Soviet Union) 1952	(Socialist Federal Republic of Yugoslavia) 1954	(Czechoslovakia) 1956	(Poland) 1958	(Bulgaria) 1960	(France) 1962	(Hungary) 1964	(Romania) 1966	(Italy) 1968	(Netherlands) 1970	(Bulgaria) 1972	(Italy) 1974	(France) 1976	(Poland) 1978	(Socialist Federal Republic of Yugoslavia) 1980	(Italy) 1981	(Hungary) 1983
Austria		10th	9th	8th	8th	10th						11th	12th						
Belarus	played as part of the Soviet Union																		
Belgium		8th					10th	10th			7th	12th			12th		13th		
Bosnia and Herzegovina	played as part of Yugoslavia																		
Bulgaria			4th	3rd	4th	1st	2nd	3rd	2nd	7th	5th	4th	2nd	5th	3rd	7th	5th	5th	2nd
Croatia	played as part of Yugoslavia																		
Czech Republic	played as part of Czechoslovakia																		
Czechoslovakia		3rd	2nd	2nd	3rd	3rd	3rd	2nd	3rd	2nd	9th	5th	3rd	2nd	2nd	3rd	4th	3rd	6th
Denmark				10th	13th									13th					
East Germany			12th			9th			6th	3rd	4th		7th						
England																	14th		
Finland			11th		11th												12th	12th	
France	4th	4th	7th	6th	7th	6th		8th	10th	11th	11th	2nd	4th	7th	4th	4th	11th		
Germany				9th	15th					12th	13th			10th	13th	12th		10th	12th
Great Britain					X												X		
Greece																			
Hungary		2nd	3rd	4th	2nd	7th	9th	7th	8th	9th	10th	10th	6th	4th	8th	6th	7th	9th	3rd
Israel		11th																	
Italy	1st	5th	6th	7th	6th		7th	9th	9th	10th	6th	9th	10th	3rd	7th	9th	9th	7th	5th
Latvia	played as part of the Soviet Union																		
Lithuania	2nd	played as part of the Soviet Union																	
Luxembourg																			
Moldova	played as part of the Soviet Union																		
Montenegro	played as part of Yugoslavia																		
Netherlands		12th			12th	8th	8th			5th	12th	7th	11th	11th	11th	10th	6th	6th	8th
Poland	3rd	6th	5th		5th	5th	4th	6th	5th	8th	3rd	6th	9th	9th	6th	5th	2nd	2nd	7th
Romania		7th	10th		10th		6th	4th	4th	4th	8th	8th	5th	6th	9th	8th	8th	8th	9th
Russia	played as part of the Soviet Union																		
Scotland					16th														
Serbia	played as part of Yugoslavia																		
Slovakia	played as part of Czechoslovakia																		
Slovenia	played as part of Yugoslavia																		
Soviet Union		1st	1st	1st	1st	2nd	1st	1st	1st	1st	1st	1st	1st	1st	1st	1st	1st	1st	1st
Spain														12th	10th	11th	10th		11th
Sweden																13th		11th	10th
Switzerland	5th	9th	8th		14th														
Turkey																			
Ukraine	played as part of the Soviet Union																		
Yugoslavia				5th	9th	4th	5th	5th	7th	6th	2nd	3rd	8th	8th	5th	2nd	3rd	4th	4th
Total	5	12	12	10	16	10	10	10	10	12	13	12	12	13	13	13	14	12	12

Nation	(Italy) 1985	(Spain) 1987	(Bulgaria) 1989	(Israel) 1991	(Italy) 1993	(Czech Republic) 1995	(Hungary) 1997	(Poland) 1999	(France) 2001	(Greece) 2003	(Turkey) 2005	(Italy) 2007	(Latvia) 2009	(Poland) 2011	(France) 2013	(Hungary) (Romania) 2015	(Czech Republic) 2017	(Latvia) (Serbia) 2019	(France) (Spain) 2021	(Israel) (Slovenia) 2023	(Czech Republic) (Germany) (Greece) (Italy) 2025	(Belgium) (Finland) (Lithuania) (Sweden) 2027	(Finland) (Luxembourg) (Switzerland) (N/A) 2029	Overall Appearances
Austria																								7
Belarus	see Soviet Union											3rd	4th	9th	5th	4th	15th	13th	4th					8
Belgium	12th									6th		7th					3rd	5th	3rd	1st	1st	Q		16
Bosnia and Herzegovina	see Yugoslavia						12th	10th											5th					3
Bulgaria	2nd	9th	3rd	4th	6th																			22
Croatia	see Yugoslavia					8th		8th				13th		5th	11th	12th			11th					7
Czech Republic	see Czechoslovakia					7th	9th	5th	9th	2nd	1st	5th	9th	4th	6th	11th	13th	15th	15th	7th	6th			16
Czechoslovakia	4th	4th	2nd	5th		defunct																		22
Denmark																								3
East Germany					reunited with Germany																			6
England														X	X	X		X						1
Finland		12th																				Q	Q	7
France	8th	8th	8th		2nd	11th		2nd	1st	5th	5th	8th	1st	3rd	2nd	2nd	2nd	2nd	2nd	3rd	4th			35
Germany						14th	3rd	12th			11th	11th		13th						6th	5th			17
Great Britain														11th	9th	20th		4th		10th	14th			7
Greece									10th	9th	10th	13th	5th	13th		10th	4th		16th	11th	11th			11
Hungary	3rd	3rd	7th	3rd	8th	12th	4th		7th	10th			13th			17th	12th	7th		4th				32
Israel				8th						12th		13th	13th	13th						16th				7
Italy	7th	5th	5th	7th	4th	2nd	11th	11th				9th	6th		8th	15th	7th	9th	9th	9th	3rd			35
Latvia	see Soviet Union							9th			6th	4th	7th	8th	15th	13th	6th	11th		13th				10
Lithuania	see Soviet Union					5th	1st	6th	4th		4th	6th	11th	7th	14th	8th					8th	Q		13
Luxembourg																							Q	1
Moldova	see Soviet Union					6th	7th																	2
Montenegro	see Yugoslavia					see Serbia and Montenegro								6th	10th	7th	16th	12th	12th	8th	15th			8
Netherlands	11th		6th																					16
Poland	6th	10th		6th	5th			1st	6th	4th	7th		11th	11th		18th								29
Portugal																					12th			1
Romania	9th	11th				13th			12th		12th	13th				19th								23
Russia	see Soviet Union				7th	3rd	6th	3rd	2nd	1st	2nd	1st	2nd	1st	13th	6th	9th	8th	6th					15
Scotland														X	X	X		X						1
Serbia	see Yugoslavia									8th	9th	11th	13th		4th	1st	11th	3rd	1st	5th	13th			11
Slovakia	see Czechoslovakia				3rd	4th	2nd	4th	8th	7th			8th	13th	12th	9th	8th		13th	12th				13
Slovenia	see Yugoslavia																14th	10th	10th	15th	9th			5
Soviet Union	1st	1st	1st	1st	defunct																			22
Spain	10th	6th			1st	9th	5th		3rd	3rd	3rd	2nd	3rd	9th	1st	3rd	1st	1st	7th	2nd	2nd			23
Sweden		7th													7th	14th		6th	8th		10th	Q		10
Switzerland																					16th		Q	6
Turkey											8th	9th	9th	2nd	3rd	5th	5th	14th	14th	14th	7th			11
Ukraine	see Soviet Union					1st	10th		11th	11th			13th		16th	16th	10th	16th						9
Yugoslavia	5th	2nd	4th	2nd		10th	8th	7th	5th	defunct														24
Total	12	12	8	8	8	14	12	12	12	12	12	16	16	16	16	20	16	16	16	16	16	16	16	

== Debut of teams ==
A total of 340 national teams have appeared in at least one FIBA Women's EuroBasket in the history of the tournament through the 2025 competition. Each successive EuroBasket has had at least one team appearing for the first time. Countries competing in their first EuroBasket are listed below by year.

Year	Debutants	Number
1938	France, Italy, Lithuania, Poland, Switzerland	5
1950	Austria, Belgium, Czechoslovakia, Hungary, Israel, Netherlands, Romania, Soviet Union	8
1952	Bulgaria, East Germany, Finland, Italy, Lithuania, Poland, Switzerland	7
1954	Denmark, Germany, Yugoslavia	10
1956	Scotland	11
1958	None	11
1960	None	11
1962	None	11
1964	None	11
1966	None	11
1968	None	11
1970	None	11
1972	None	11
1974	Spain	12
1976	None	12
1978	Sweden	13
1980	England	14
1981	None	14
1983	None	14
1985	None	14
1987	None	14
1989	None	14
1991	None	14
1993	Russia, Slovakia	16
1995	Croatia, Czech Republic, Moldova, Ukraine	20
1997	Bosnia and Herzegovina	21
1999	Latvia	22
2001	Greece	23
2003	Serbia	24
2005	Turkey	25
2007	Belarus	26
2009	None	26
2011	Great Britain, Montenegro	28
2013	None	28
2015	None	28
2017	Slovenia	29
2019	None	29
2021	None	29
2023	None	29
2025	Portugal	30
2027	TBD	30
2029	Luxembourg	31
Total		31

== Most successful players ==
Boldface denotes active basketball players and highest medal count among all players (including these who not included in these tables) per type.

=== Multiple gold medalists ===
Rank	Player	Country	From	To	Gold	Silver	Bronze	Total
1	Uļjana (Iulijaka) Semjonova	Soviet Union	1968	1985	**10**	–	–	**10**
2	Olga Sukharnova	Soviet Union	1972	1987	9	–	–	9
3	Olesya Barel	Soviet Union	1980	1989	6	–	–	6
3	Olga Buryakina (Yerofeyeva)	Soviet Union	1978	1987	6	–	–	6
3	Nadezhda Olkhova (Shuvayeva)	Soviet Union	1974	1983	6	–	–	6
3	Tatyana Ovechkina (Kabayeva)	Soviet Union	1970	1980	6	–	–	6
3	Galina Savitskaya (Krisevich)	Soviet Union	1980	1989	6	–	–	6
8	Lyudmila Bazarevich (Kukanova)	Soviet Union	1962	1970	5	–	–	5
8	Skaidrīte Budovska (Smildziņa)	Soviet Union	1960	1968	5	–	–	5
8	Yelena Chausova	Soviet Union	1978	1985	5	–	–	5
8	Nelli Feryabnikova (Bilmayer)	Soviet Union	1970	1978	5	–	–	5
8	Nina Poznanskaya	Soviet Union	1956	1966	5	–	–	5
8	Nadezhda Zakharova	Soviet Union	1968	1976	5	–	–	5

=== Multiple medalists ===
The table shows players who have won at least 7 medals in total at the Eurobasket Women.

Rank	Player	Country	From	To	Gold	Silver	Bronze	Total
1	Uļjana (Iulijaka) Semjonova	Soviet Union	1968	1985	**10**	–	–	**10**
2	Olga Sukharnova	Soviet Union	1972	1987	9	–	–	9
3	Laia Palau	Spain	2003	2019	3	1	**4**	8
4	Maria Stepanova	Russia	1999	2011	3	3	1	7
5	Endéné Miyem	France	2009	2021	1	**5**	1	7
6	Sandrine Gruda	France	2009	2023	1	4	2	7
7	Milena Vecková (Blahoutová)	Czechoslovakia	1952	1964	–	3	**4**	7

== Tournament awards ==
Most recent award winners (2025)

Year	Winner
2025	(Belgium) Emma Meesseman

Year	Player	Position	Team
2025	Julie Allemand	Guard	Belgium
2025	Cecilia Zandalasini	Guard	Italy
2025	Alba Torrens	Forward	Spain
2025	Emma Meesseman	Center	Belgium
2025	Raquel Carrera	Center	Spain

== See also ==
- Basketball at the Olympic Games
- EuroBasket
- FIBA Women's Basketball World Cup
- FIBA Women's European Championship for Small Countries
- FIBA Europe U-20 Championship for Women
- FIBA Europe U-18 Championship for Women
- FIBA Europe U-16 Championship for Women
- European Wheelchair Basketball Championship
