= Lidiya Alekseyeva =

Russian basketball coach

Lidiya Vladimirovna Alekseyeva (Russian: Лидия Владимировна Алексеева, 4 July 1924 – 26 June 2014) was a Russian basketball player and coach. Alekseyeva was born in Moscow. Alekseyeva was inducted into the inaugural class of the Women's Basketball Hall of Fame in 1999. She was inducted into the FIBA Hall of Fame in 2007. On 24 February 2012, Alekseyeva was announced as a member of the Naismith Memorial Basketball Hall of Fame Class of 2012; she was formally inducted on 7 September.

== Basketball playing career ==
As a player, Alekseyeva won the USSR Women's League with the MAI Moscow team in 1947, 1951, 1954, 1955, and 1956, and the USSR Cup in 1952. While playing with the senior USSR National Team, she won the gold medal at the EuroBasket Women, in 1950, 1952, 1954, and 1956.

== Basketball coaching career ==
Alekseyeva was the head coach of the senior USSR Women's National Team for 22 years (1962–1984), and during that time the team won every competition they participated in. Specifically, they won the Summer Olympic Games gold in 1976 and 1980, the FIBA World Championship for Women in 1964, 1967, 1971, 1975, and 1983 (the USSR boycotted the 1979 tournament), and the EuroBasket Women in 1962, 1964, 1966, 1968, 1970, 1972, 1974, 1976, 1978, 1980, 1981, and 1983.

== Awards and honors ==
- Honored Master of Sports of the USSR (1950)
- Order of Lenin (1957)
- Honored coach of the USSR (1964)
- Order of the Badge of Honor (1985)
- Women's Basketball Hall of Fame Inductee (1999)
- FIBA Hall of Fame (2007)

== Personal life ==
Alekseyeva's husband, Evgeny Alekseev, was also a well-known basketball player and coach.

== See also ==
- List of EuroBasket Women winning head coaches
