= Vanya Voynova =

Bulgarian basketball player

Personal information
- Born: 22 October 1934 Sofia, Bulgaria
- Died: 9 March 1993 (aged 58) Sofia, Bulgaria
- Listed height: 1.83 m (6 ft 0 in)

Career information
- Playing career: 1950–1968
- Position: Center
- Number: 8

Career history
- 1950–1968: WBC Slavia Sofia
- Women's Basketball Hall of Fame
- FIBA Hall of Fame

Vanya Voynova (Bulgarian: Ваня Войнова; 27 December 1934 – 9 March 1993) was a Bulgarian basketball player. She has played for Slavia Sofia from 1950 to 1968, winning the European Champions' Cup in 1959 and 1963 and Bulgarian league 12 times from 1953 to 1965. With the Bulgaria women's national basketball team, she has won silver in the 1959 World Championship, bronze in the 1964 World Championship, gold in the 1958 European Championship, silver in the 1960 European Championship and 1964 European Championship and bronze in the 1954 European Championship and 1962 European Championship. She has been inducted into the Women's Basketball Hall of Fame in 2001 and FIBA Hall of Fame in 2007.

== National team ==
Vanya Voynova played for the Bulgarian national women's team for 15 years. Her generation remains a lasting trace in the history of this sport in the country. Many experts believe that this is the most successful generation of the 20th century.

With Voynova on its side, the national team won one gold and one silver, and two bronze medals at the European Championships between 1954 and 1964. At that time, the Soviet team was considered the best on the continent, but the Bulgarians broke their opponents' dominance in 1958. At the 1959 World Cup, Voynova played an essential role in winning the bronze medal, finishing with an average of 13.1 points per game. Five years later, she is on top again, and with her help, Bulgaria won the bronze medal.

- EuroBasket Women 1954
- EuroBasket Women 1958
- EuroBasket Women 1960
- EuroBasket Women 1964
- 1959 FIBA World Championship for Women
- 1964 FIBA World Championship for Women

=== 1952 European Championship for Women ===
Match	M/A	%	PF	Pts
Bulgaria - (Czech Republic) Czechoslovakia	7/12	58.3	3	27
Bulgaria - Romania	1/2	50	2	7
Bulgaria - France	3/4	75	0	13
Bulgaria - Italy	3/3	100	4	11
Bulgaria - Poland	9/10	90	2	35

=== 1954 European Championship for Women ===
Match	M/A	%	PF	Pts
Bulgaria - (Czech Republic) Czechoslovakia	0	0	0	33
Bulgaria - Denmark	0	0	0	22
Bulgaria - France	0	0	0	14
Bulgaria - (Socialist Federal Republic of Yugoslavia) Yugoslavia	0	0	0	17
Bulgaria - Hungary	0	0	0	18
Bulgaria - (Soviet Union) Czechoslovakia	0	0	0	22
Bulgaria - (Soviet Union) Czechoslovakia	0	0	0	4

=== 1956 European Championship for Women ===
Match	M/A	%	PF	Pts
Bulgaria - Poland	6/9	66.7	4	24
Bulgaria - Finland	0/0	0	0	0
Bulgaria - (Socialist Federal Republic of Yugoslavia) Yugoslavia	3/4	75	5	9
Bulgaria - Austria	3/3	100	3	10
Bulgaria - (Czech Republic) Czechoslovakia	1/2	50	5	9
Bulgaria - Soviet Union	10/11	90.9	3	20
Bulgaria - (Czech Republic) Czechoslovakia	6/6	100	5	10

=== 1958 European Championship for Women ===
Match	M/A	%	PF	Pts
Bulgaria - (Czech Republic) Czechoslovakia	0/1	0	5	2
Bulgaria - Austria	4/4	100	2	14
Bulgaria - France	4/5	80	2	16
Bulgaria - Poland	1/1	100	5	1
Bulgaria - (Socialist Federal Republic of Yugoslavia) Yugoslavia	6/7	85.7	3	24
Bulgaria - Soviet Union	7/9	77.8	5	19
Bulgaria - (Czech Republic) Czechoslovakia	4/6	66.7	5	22
