= Voynov =

Voynov or Voinov (Russian, Ukrainian or Bulgarian: Войнов or Воинов, from воин meaning warrior) is a Russian masculine surname, its feminine counterpart is Voynova or Voinova. Notable people with the surname include:

- Aleksandr Voynov (born 1993), Russian football midfielder
- Anastasia Voynova (born 1993), Russian track cyclist
- Denis Voynov (born 1990), Russian footballer
- Dimitrie Voinov (1867–1951), Romanian zoologist, histologist and cytologist
- Iliya Voynov (born 1964), Bulgarian football winger
- Nicolae Voinov (1834–1899), Romanian politician
- Sergey Voynov (born 1977), Uzbekistani javelin thrower
- Slava Voynov (born 1990), Russian ice hockey player
- Vanya Voynova (1934–1993), Bulgarian basketball player
- Voyn Voynov (born 1952), Bulgarian footballer and manager
- Yuriy Voynov (1931–2003), Soviet footballer and manager
