= Pierre Vincent =

Pierre Vincent may refer to:

- Pierre Vincent (athlete) (born 1992), French sprinter in 2014 European Athletics Championships etc.
- Pierre Vincent (basketball) (born 1964), French basketball coach
- Pierre L. J. Vincent, Canadian republican activist
- Pierre H. Vincent, Canadian Member of Parliament for Trois-Rivières, Québec, 1984–1993

== See also ==
- Pierre-Vincent Valin (1827–1897), Canadian businessman and political figure from Quebec
