= Kyara Linskens =

Belgian basketball player (born 1996)

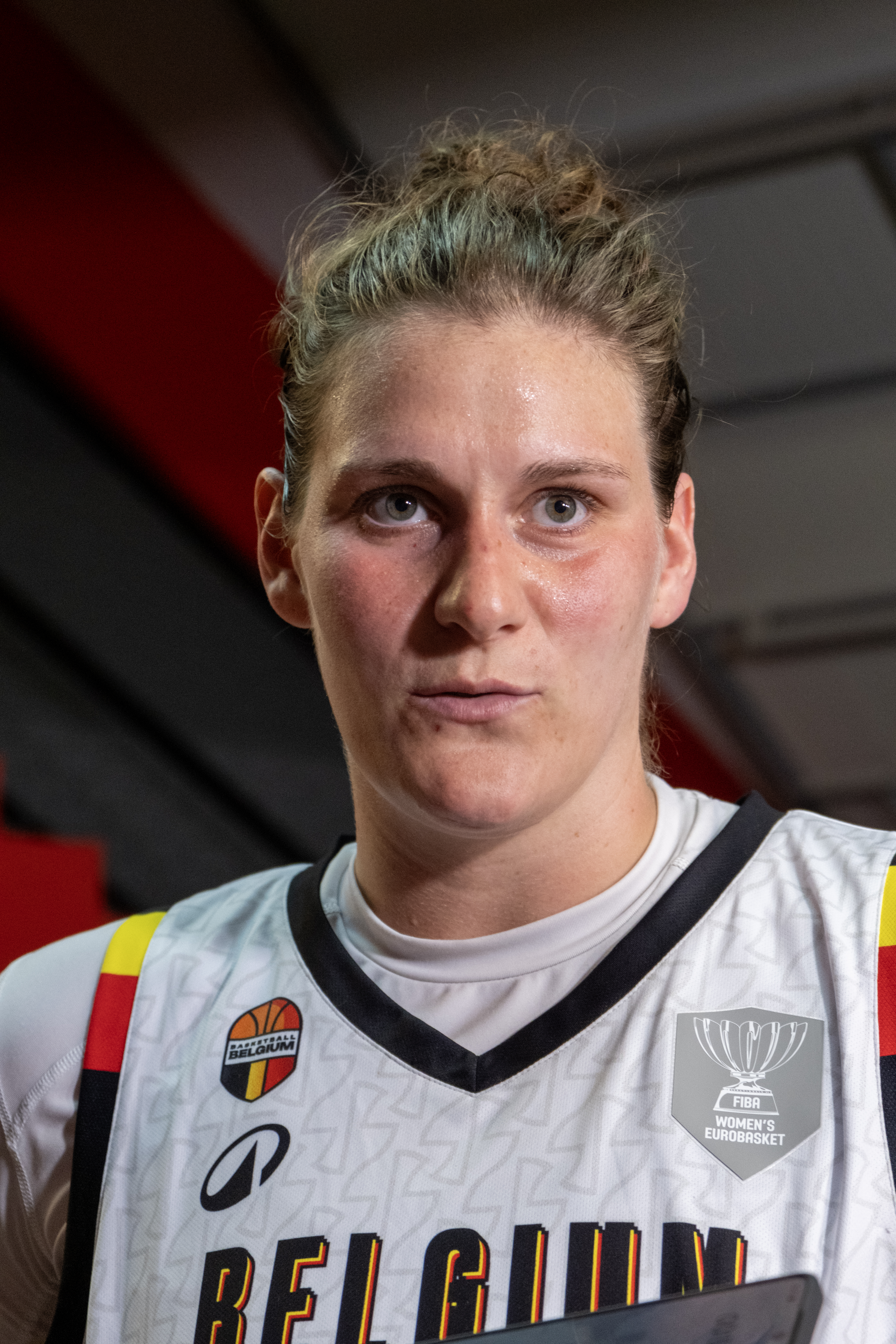
- Linskens with Belgium during 2025 EuroBasket

No. 31 – Phoenix Mercury
- Position: Center
- League: WNBA

Personal information
- Born: 13 November 1996 (age 30) Bruges, Belgium
- Listed height: 6 ft 4 in (1.93 m)
- Listed weight: 209 lb (95 kg)

Career information
- Playing career: 2012–present

Career history
- 2012–2014: Basket Hema SKW
- 2014–2016: BC Castors Braine
- 2016–2017: BC Namur-Capitale
- 2017–2018: Basketball Nymburk
- 2018–2019: Gorzów Wielkopolski
- 2019–2020: Enisey
- 2020–2021: Magnolia Basket Campobasso
- 2021–2022: Nadezhda Orenburg
- 2022–2024: Lattes-Montpellier
- 2024–: Dynamo Kursk
- 2025: Golden State Valkyries
- 2026–present: Phoenix Mercury

Career highlights
- Belgian League: 2015; Belgian Cup: 2015, 2016; Czech League: 2018; Polish League: 2019; FIBA EuroBasket Champion, Finals MVP (2023), Champion (2025)
- Stats at Basketball Reference

Kyara Chantal C. Linskens (born 13 November 1996) is a Belgian basketball player for the Phoenix Mercury of the Women's National Basketball Association (WNBA) and Belgian national team. She previously played for the Golden State Valkyries.

She participated at the EuroBasket Women 2017 and the EuroBasket Women 2021, earning bronze with Belgium. At EuroBasket Women 2023, she won the gold medal with Belgium and was awarded Finals MVP with 18 points, 15 rebounds versus Spain women's national basketball team. 9 of her points in the 2023 finals game were from free throws, which she shot with 100% accuracy. Linskens was also part of the Belgian team than won the EuroBasket Women 2025 championship.

== Career statistics ==
Legend
GP	Games played	GS	Games started	MPG	Minutes per game	RPG	Rebounds per game
APG	Assists per game	SPG	Steals per game	BPG	Blocks per game	PPG	Points per game
TO	Turnovers per game	FG%	Field-goal percentage	3P%	3-point field-goal percentage	FT%	Free-throw percentage
**Bold**	Career best	°	League leader

=== WNBA ===
Stats current through game on June 7, 2025

WNBA regular season statistics
Year	Team	GP	GS	MPG	FG%	3P%	FT%	RPG	APG	SPG	BPG	TO	PPG
2025	Golden State	4	0	6.8	.400	.000	—	1.5	0.3	0.3	0.8	0.5	1.0
**Career**	1 year, 1 team	4	0	6.8	.400	.000	—	1.5	0.3	0.3	0.8	0.5	1.0

=== Russia-PBL ===
==== Regular season ====
Stats current through end of 2025 season

Russia-PBL regular season statistics
Year	Team	GP	GS	MPG	FG%	3P%	FT%	RPG	APG	SPG	BPG	TO	PPG
2024–2025	Dynamo Kursk	35		21.0	.58	.20	.845	6.9	1.9	0.7	0.7	2.7	12.4
**Career**	1 year, 1 team	35		21.0	.58	.20	.845	6.9	1.9	0.7	0.7	2.7	12.4

== Honours ==
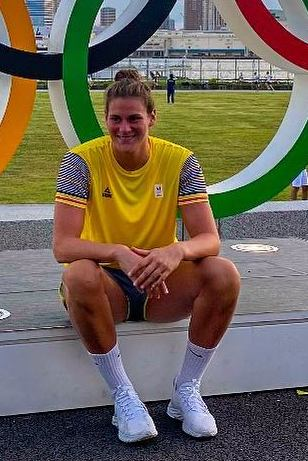
Linskens in 2022

=== Club ===
==== Castors Braine ====
- Belgian League: 2014–15, 2015-16
- Belgian Cup: 2015

==== Namur-Capitale ====
- Belgian Cup: 2016

==== Basketball Nymburk ====
- Czech League: 2017–18

==== Gorzów Wielkopolski ====
- Polish League: 2018–19

=== National team ===
- U18 Women's EuroBasket (gold) : 2011
- EuroBasket Women: (gold) 2023, 2025, (bronze) 2017, 2021
- Belgian Sports team of the Year: 2020, 2023, 2025

=== Individual ===
- EuroBasket Final MVP: 2023
- All-Second Team EuroBasket: 2025
