= Bolsherechye, Omsk Oblast =

Bolsherechye Большеречье
- Urban-type settlement
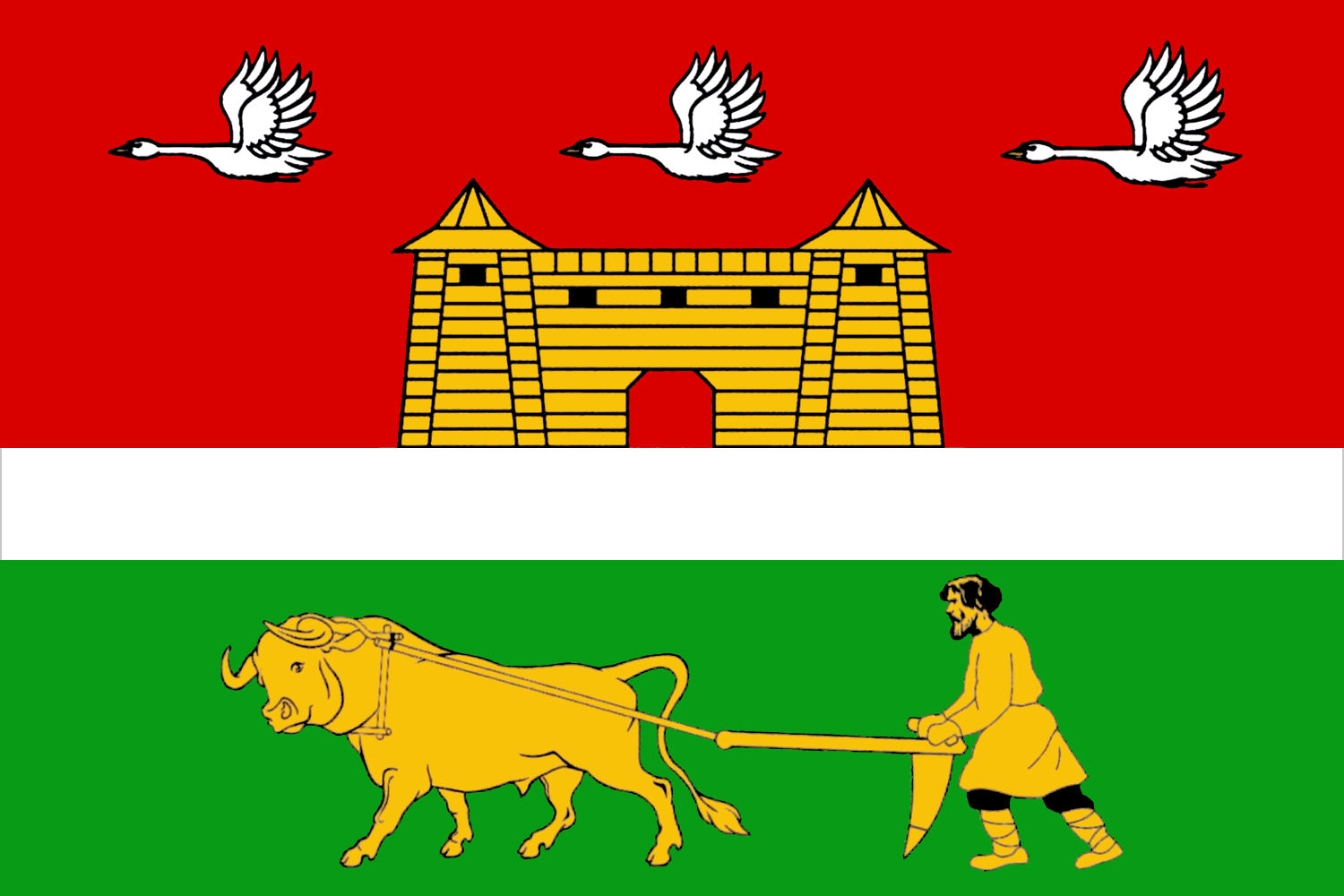
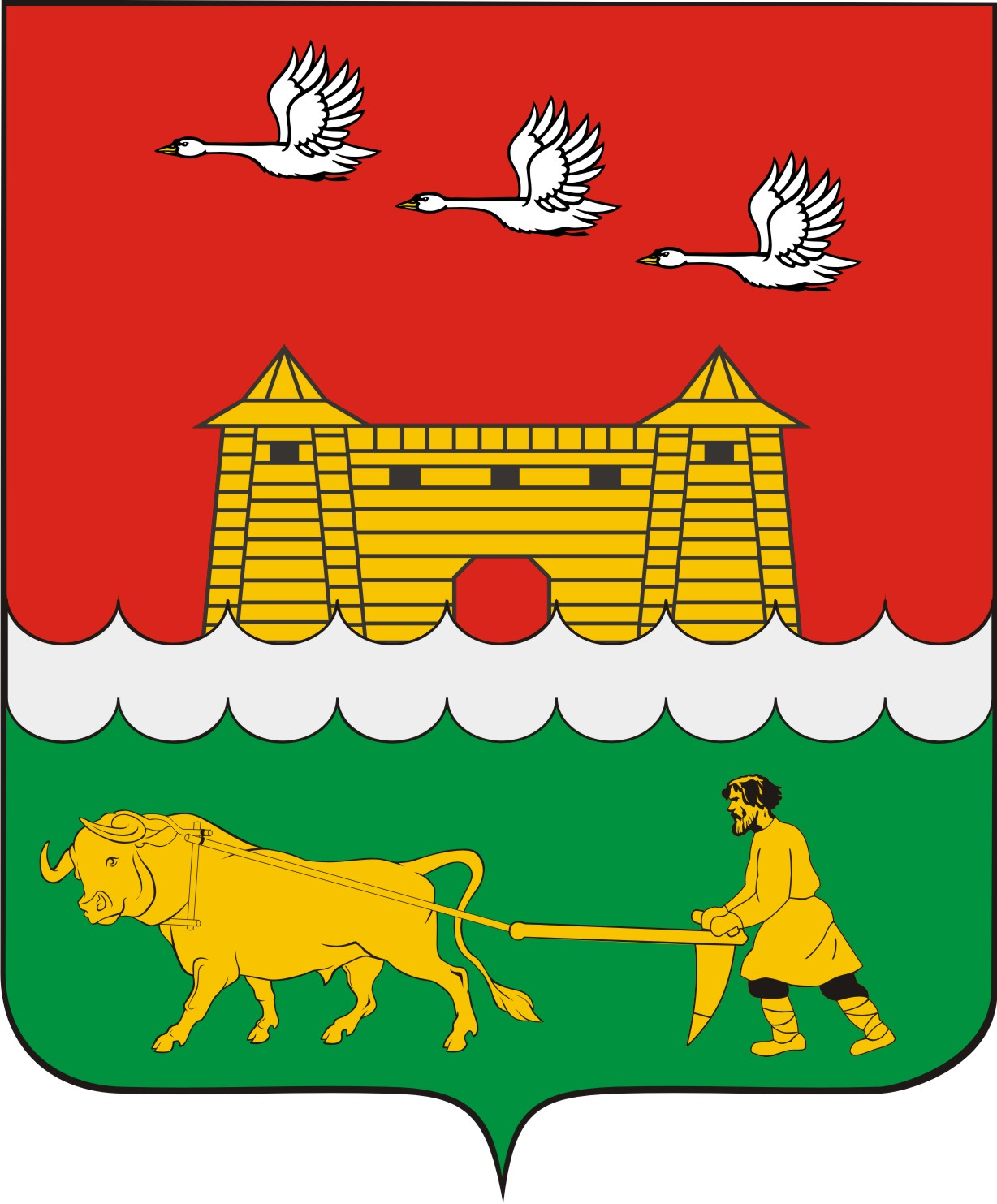
- Flag Coat of arms
- Interactive map of Bolsherechye
- Location of Bolsherechye Bolsherechye (Omsk Oblast)
- Coordinates: 56°06′N 74°38′E
- Country: Russia
- Federal subject: Omsk Oblast
- Administrative district: Bolsherechensky District
- Founded: 1741
- Elevation: 78 m (256 ft)

Population (2010 Census)
  - Total: 11,271
  - Estimate (2025): 9,649 (−14.4%)
- Time zone: UTC+6 (MSK+3)
- Postal code: 646670
- OKTMO ID: 52603151051

Bolsherechye (Russian: Большере́чье) is an urban locality (a work settlement) and the administrative center of Bolsherechensky District of Omsk Oblast, Russia, located 150 kilometers (93 mi) northeast of Omsk along the Irtysh River. Population: 11,271 (2010 census); 12,361 (2002 census); 12,477 (1989 Soviet census).

== History ==
The Bolsheretsky fortress was founded on the Irtysh as a barrier for defense from invasions in 1627. Bolsherechye is located about half-way between Omsk and Tara and is a convenient stopping point for many automobile and river travelers, including those on package tours of the region.

== Zoo ==
Bolsherechye is best known for its zoo, opened in 1983. Bolsherechye Zoo is naturally stretched out through 19 hectares (47 acres) and is much more impressive than its hometown size suggests. Being the only resident zoo in the region, it has daringly but successfully withstood the political, financial, and climatic challenges of the turbulent post-Soviet period. The zoo opens a seasonal branch exhibit in the otherwise dominant Omsk, which to this day has only a small zoological youth station.

== Notable residents ==
- Leonid Yachmenyov (1938–2021), basketball coach
