= Bolsherechensky District =

Bolsherechensky District Большереченский район (Russian)
- District
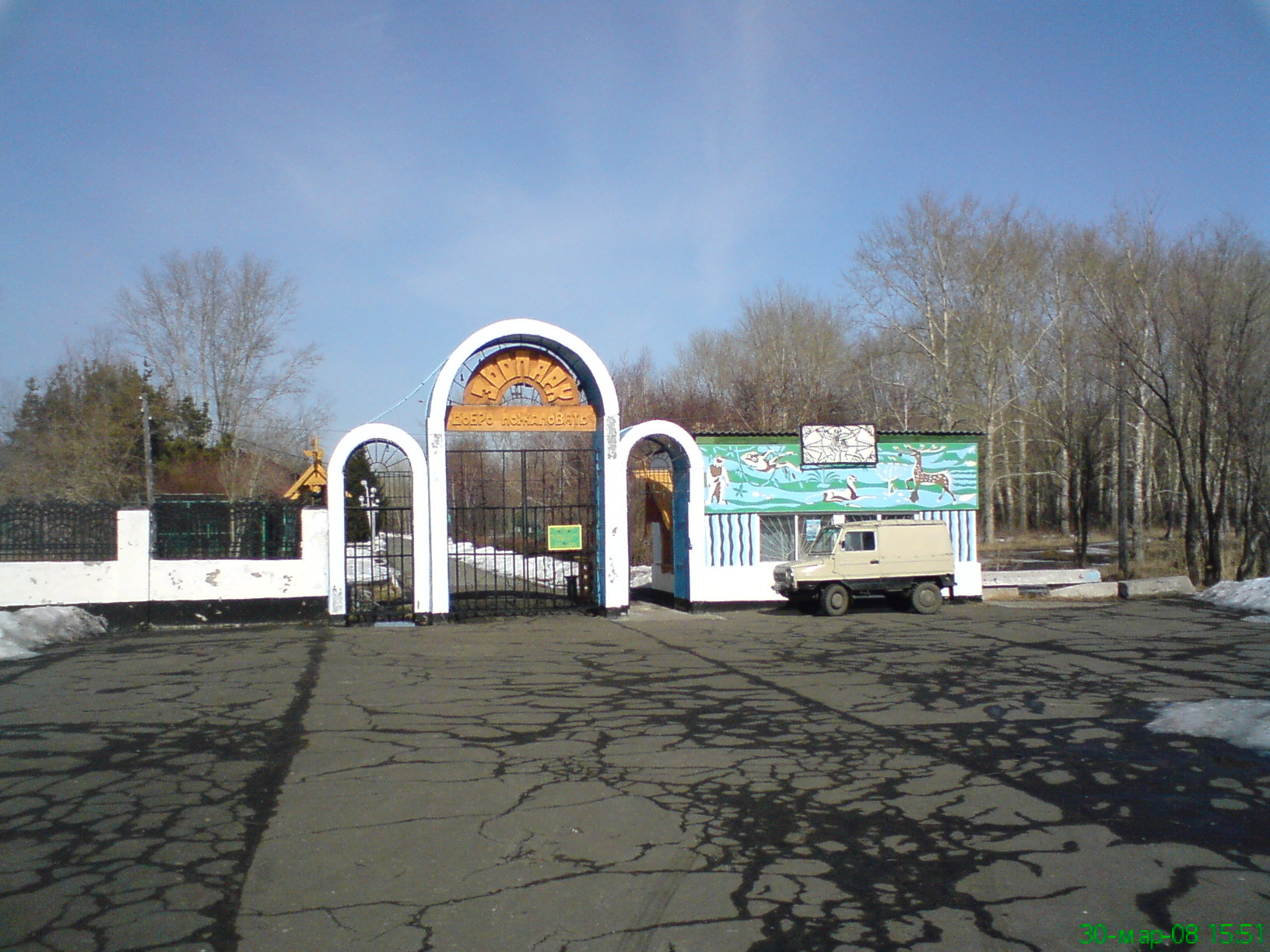
- Bolshereche Zoo, Bolsherechensky District

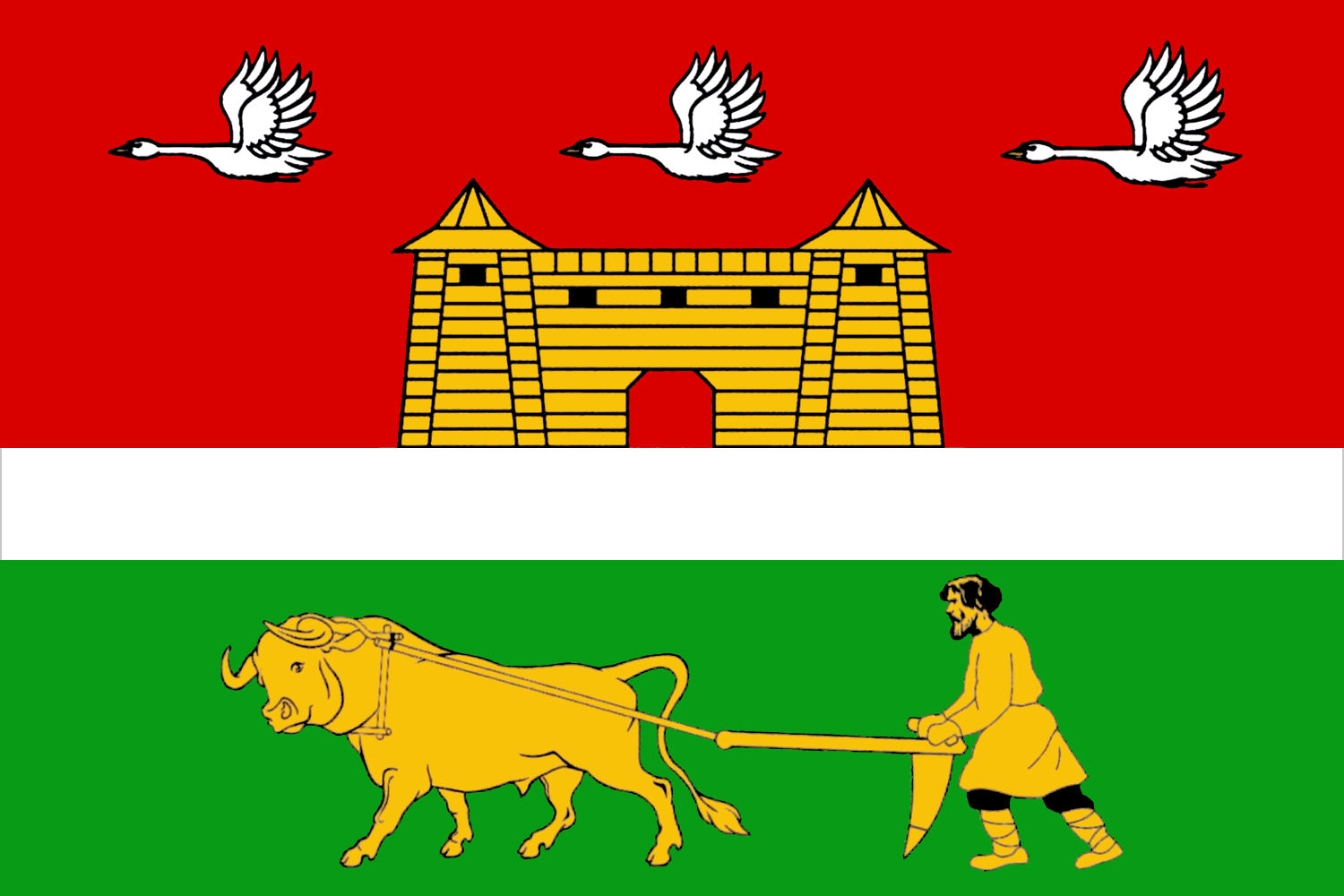
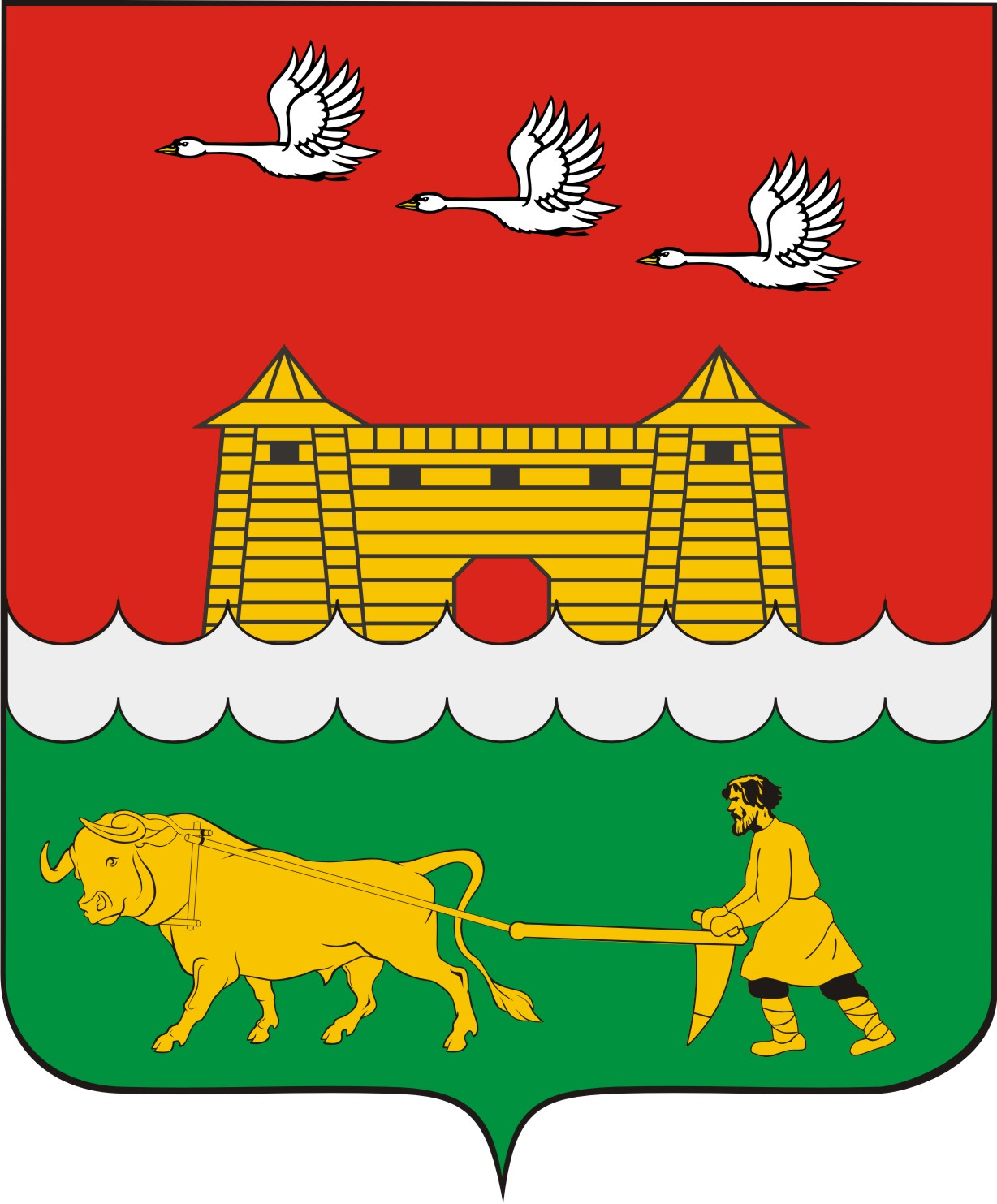
- Flag Coat of arms
- Location of Bolsherechensky District in Omsk Oblast
- Coordinates: 56°05′45″N 74°37′24″E
- Country: Russia
- Federal subject: Omsk Oblast
- Established: 25 May 1925
- Administrative center: Bolsherechye

Area
  - Total: 4,300 km^{2} (1,700 sq mi)

Population (2010 Census)
  - Total: 28,486
  - Density: 6.6/km^{2} (17/sq mi)
  - Urban: 39.6%
  - Rural: 60.4%

Administrative structure
  - Administrative divisions: 1 Work settlements, 12 Rural okrugs
  - Inhabited localities: 1 urban-type settlements, 54 rural localities

Municipal structure
  - Municipally incorporated as: Bolsherechensky Municipal District
  - Municipal divisions: 1 urban settlements, 12 rural settlements
- Time zone: UTC+6 (MSK+3)
- OKTMO ID: 52603000
- Website: www.omskportal.ru/ru/government/spravochnik/municipal/3-52-203-1.html

Bolsherechensky District (Russian: Большере́ченский райо́н) is an administrative and municipal district (raion), one of the thirty-two in Omsk Oblast, Russia. It is located in the center of the oblast. The area of the district is 4,300 square kilometers (1,700 sq mi). Its administrative center is the urban locality (a work settlement) of Bolsherechye. Population: 28,486 (2010 Census); 34,037 (2002 census); 36,726 (1989 Soviet census). The population of Bolsherechye accounts for 39.6% of the district's total population.
