= Leonid Yachmenyov =

Russian basketball coach (1938–2021)

Personal information
- Born: 21 January 1938 Bolsherechye, Omsk Oblast, Russian SFSR
- Died: 18 February 2021 (aged 83) Novosibirsk, Novosibirsk Oblast, Russia
- Coaching career: 1976–2004

Career history

Coaching
- 1976–2004: WBC Dynamo Novosibirsk
- 1986–1988: Soviet Union women's national basketball team

Leonid Yachmenyov (21 January 1938 – 18 February 2021) was a Russian basketball coach. He served as head coach of WBC Dynamo Novosibirsk from 1976 to 2004 and headed the Soviet Union women's team from 1986 to 1988.

== See also ==
- List of EuroBasket Women winning head coaches
