= EuroBasket Women 2017 final =

EuroBasket Women 2017 Final
France	Spain
	1	2	3	4	Total
France	18	12	10	15	55
Spain	21	18	17	15	71
- Date: 25 June 2017
- Venue: Arena, Prague
- Attendance: 4,500

The EuroBasket Women 2017 final was played at the O2 Arena in Prague, the Czech Republic, on 25 June 2017, between Spain and France.

Spain won the title for the third time.

== Road to the final ==
Spain
Round
France
Opponent
Result

Opponent
Result
Hungary
62–48
Game 1
Slovenia
70–68
Ukraine
76–54
Game 2
Serbia
73–57
Czech Republic
63–67
Game 3
Greece
70–63

Team	Pld	W	L	PF	PA	PD	Pts
Spain	3	2	1	201	169	+32	5
Ukraine	3	2	1	197	195	+2	5
Hungary	3	1	2	194	216	−22	4
Czech Republic	3	1	2	184	196	−12	4

First Round

Team	Pld	W	L	PF	PA	PD	Pts
France	3	3	0	213	188	+25	6
Serbia	3	1	2	205	211	−6	4
Greece	3	1	2	188	189	−1	4
Slovenia	3	1	2	196	214	−18	4

Opponent
Result

Opponent
Result
Latvia
67–47
Quarterfinals
Slovakia
67–40
Belgium
68–52
Semifinals
Greece
77–55

== Match details ==
25 June 2017
20:30

Boxscore

Spain	71–55	France
Scoring by quarter: 21–18, 18–12, 17–10, 15–15
Pts: Lyttle 19; Rebs: Lyttle 8 Asts: Cruz 5		Pts: Dumerc 15; Rebs: Époupa, Amant 4 Asts: four players 2

O2 Arena, Prague
Attendance: 4,500
Referees: Janusz Calik (POL), Michele Rossi (ITA), Özlem Yalman (TUR)

Starters:			Pts	Reb	Ast
PG	9	Laia Palau	2	5	4
SG	10	Marta Xargay	8	1	2
SF	7	Alba Torrens	18	3	2
PF	4	Laura Nicholls	5	7	1
C	14	Sancho Lyttle	19	8	2
Reserves:					
PG	6	Silvia Domínguez	4	1	2
SG	11	Leonor Rodríguez	0	0	0
SG	15	Anna Cruz	12	3	5
PG	20	Leticia Romero	0	0	0
SF	22	María Conde	0	0	0
PF	24	Laura Gil	3	4	1
PF	28	Beatriz Sánchez	0	2	0
Head coach:
Lucas Mondelo

Spain	France

Starters:			Pts	Reb	Ast
PG	9	Céline Dumerc	15	1	2
SG	12	Gaëlle Skrela	0	1	1
SF	93	Diandra Tchatchouang	10	3	2
PF	8	Héléna Ciak	4	2	1
C	5	Endéné Miyem	8	3	1
Reserves:					
SG	0	Olivia Époupa	5	4	2
F	10	Sarah Michel	2	2	0
SF	11	Valériane Ayayi	0	0	1
SF	16	Hhadydia Minte	0	1	1
SG	17	Marine Johannès	6	1	2
C	18	Alexia Chartereau	3	0	0
C	25	Marielle Amant	2	4	1
Head coach:
Valérie Garnier
