= 1959 FIBA World Championship for Women =

Tournament details
- Host country: Soviet Union
- Dates: 10–18 October
- Teams: 8
- Venue: 1 (in 1 host city)

Final positions
- Champions: Soviet Union (1st title)

The 1959 FIBA World Championship for Women (Russian: Чемпионат мира по баскетболу среди женщин 1959) was the third FIBA World Championship for Women basketball championship held by FIBA. It was held in the Soviet Union between 10 October and 18 October 1959. Eight national teams entered the event under the auspices of FIBA, the sport's governing body. The city of Moscow hosted the tournament. The Soviet Union won its first title after finishing in first place in round-robin group. The United States were the defending champions but did not participate at the tournament.

== Squads ==
=== Soviet Union ===
- 3 Nina MAKSIMELIANOVA
- 4 Skaidrīte Smildziņa-Budovska
- 5 Valentina KOSTIKOVA
- 6 Maret-Mai Otsa
- 7 Nina POZNANSKAYA
- 8 Raisa KUZNETSOVA-MIKHAILOVA
- 9 Ene Kitsing
- 10 Jurate DOKTORAITE
- 11 Nina ARCISEVSKAYA
- 12 Nina EREMINA
- 13 Galina JAROSEVSKAYA
- 14 Helena BITNERE

== Results ==
The tournament consisted of a single round-robin group. Every team played each other once and the top team in the group was declared champion.

Team	Pld	W	L	PF	PA	PD	Pts
Soviet Union	7	7	0	467	263	+204	14
Bulgaria	7	6	1	403	318	+85	13
Czechoslovakia	7	5	2	467	358	+109	12
Yugoslavia	7	3	4	317	395	−78	10
Poland	7	3	4	362	370	−8	10
Romania	7	2	5	312	371	−59	9
Hungary	7	2	5	323	431	−108	9
South Korea	7	0	7	299	444	−145	7

10 October
11:00

Boxscore

Czechoslovakia	76–61	Poland
Scoring by half: 48–32, 28–29
Pts: Hubálková 29		Pts: Roga 19

10 October
12:30

Boxscore

Romania	52–41	South Korea
Scoring by half: 24–18, 28–23
Pts: Romfeld 17		Pts: Ok 12

10 October
19:00

Boxscore

Bulgaria	70–41	Hungary
Scoring by half: 43–18, 27–23
Pts: Vojnova 13		Pts: Kovács 12

10 October
20:30

Boxscore

Yugoslavia	42–80	Soviet Union
Scoring by half: 23–35, 19–45
Pts: Krvavica 16		Pts: Kostikova 24

11 October
16:00

Boxscore

Czechoslovakia	55–38	Romania
Scoring by half: 34–26, 21–12
Pts: Grubrová, Mázlová 14		Pts: Rakovica 15

11 October
17:30

Boxscore

Hungary	49–48	Yugoslavia
Scoring by half: 24–25, 25–23
Pts: Parti 13		Pts: Radovanović 11

11 October
19:00

Boxscore

Poland	45–67	Soviet Union
Scoring by half: 27–40, 18–27
Pts: Bajer 12		Pts: Kostikova 19

12 October
18:00

Boxscore

South Korea	42–48	Bulgaria
Scoring by half: 28–24, 14–24
Pts: Za 14		Pts: Kuzova, Vojnova 17

12 October
19:30

Boxscore

Romania	45–52	Poland
Scoring by half: 30–27, 15–25
Pts: Nikolescu 17		Pts: Szostak 13

12 October
21:00

Boxscore

Soviet Union	51–29	Hungary
Scoring by half: 25–15, 26–14
Pts: Maksimelianova 13		Pts: Lik, Parti 5

13 October
19:00

Boxscore

Yugoslavia	50–47	South Korea
Scoring by half: 27–24, 23–23
Pts: Radovanović 24		Pts: Za 13

13 October
20:30

Boxscore

Bulgaria	54–47	Czechoslovakia
Scoring by half: 27–24, 27–23
Pts: Calkaskanova 16		Pts: Hubálková 23

14 October
11:00

Boxscore

South Korea	24–89	Soviet Union
Scoring by half: 12–47, 12–42
Pts: Suk 8		Pts: Maksimelianova 22

14 October
12:30

Boxscore

Romania	37–64	Bulgaria
Scoring by half: 15–32, 22–32
Pts: Kraus 12		Pts: Vojnova 12

14 October
19:00

Boxscore

Poland	62–40	Hungary
Scoring by half: 36–19, 26–21
Pts: Roga 23		Pts: PRKen 10

14 October
20:30

Boxscore

Czechoslovakia	79–43	Yugoslavia
Scoring by half: 45–21, 34–22
Pts: Hubálková 15		Pts: Baraga, Ciprus 9

15 October
19:00

Boxscore

Yugoslavia	40–38	Romania
Scoring by half: 22–13, 18–25
Pts: Krvavica 12		Pts: Kukuruz 12

15 October
20:30

Boxscore

Soviet Union	59–46	Czechoslovakia
Scoring by half: 28–24, 31–22
Pts: Maksimelianova 17		Pts: Hubálková, Mázlová 10

16 October
19:00

Boxscore

Hungary	62–57	South Korea
Scoring by half: 27–31, 35–26
Pts: PRKen 14		Pts: Za 18

16 October
19:00

Boxscore

Bulgaria	62–48	Poland
Scoring by half: 31–20, 31–28
Pts: Vojnova 18		Pts: Olesevicz 16

17 October
11:00

Boxscore

Poland	59–38	South Korea
Scoring by half: 26–14, 33–24
Pts: Roga 19		Pts: Ok 12

17 October
12:30

Boxscore

Romania	39–70	Soviet Union
Scoring by half: 18–37, 21–33
Pts: Rakovica 11		Pts: Smildziņa 17

17 October
17:00

Boxscore

Czechoslovakia	80–53	Hungary
Scoring by half: 38–28, 42–25
Pts: Hubálková 32		Pts: PRKen 12

17 October
18:30

Boxscore

Bulgaria	67–52	Yugoslavia
Scoring by half: 44–26, 23–26
Pts: Borisova 17		Pts: Kalušević 14

18 October
12:00

Boxscore

South Korea	50–84	Czechoslovakia
Scoring by half: 22–50, 28–34
Pts: Ok, Sin 13		Pts: Mázlová 19

18 October
13:30

Boxscore

Hungary	49–63	Romania
Scoring by half: 24–42, 25–21
Pts: Kalo 11		Pts: Nikolescu 18

18 October
15:00

Boxscore

Yugoslavia	42–35	Poland
Scoring by half: 22–20, 20–15
Pts: Radovanović 11		Pts: Olesevicz 16

18 October
16:30

Boxscore

Soviet Union	51–38	Bulgaria
Scoring by half: 21–16, 30–22
Pts: Smildziņa 26		Pts: Vojnova 12

== Awards ==
1959 World Championship winner

Soviet Union
First title

== Bibliography ==
- Official Results and Squads (FIBA)
- Results
