= Vadim Kapranov =

Russian basketball player (1940–2021)

Personal information
- Nationality: Russian
- Born: 26 February 1940; Moscow, Russian SFSR, Soviet Union
- Died: 4 June 2021 (aged 81); Moscow, Russia

Sport
- Sport: Basketball

Vadim Pavlovich Kapranov (26 February 1940 – 4 June 2021) was a Russian basketball player and coach. He competed in the men's tournament at the 1968 Summer Olympics.

Kapranov died on 4 June 2021, aged 81.

== See also ==
- List of EuroBasket Women winning head coaches
