= Maret-Mai Otsa =

Estonian basketball player (1931–2020)

Maret-Mai Otsa (since 1963 Višnjova; 22 February 1931 – 2 May 2020) was an Estonian basketballer and sport pedagogue.

She was born in Tartu. In 1955 she graduated from the University of Tartu's Institute of Physical Education.

She started her basketball exercising in 1946, coached by Viktor Laats, Eedi Juurup and Leo Mõtsar. 1952–1960 she was a member of Soviet Union women's national basketball team. In 1959 the team won gold medal at FIBA Basketball World Cup. 1949–1963 she was a member of the Estonian national basketball team.

In 1963 she moved to Minsk and played for the Belarusian national team. She later returned to Estonia. Elected to the Hall of fame of Estonian basketball in 2010.

== Achievements ==
=== National team ===
- World Championships: 1959
- European Championships: 1952, 1954, 1956, 1958, 1960

Awards:

- Order of the Estonian Red Cross, IV class
- 2010: member of Hall of Fame of Estonian basketball
