= Pierre Vincent (basketball) =

French basketball coach

Pierre Vincent in 2026

Pierre Vincent (born 17 April 1964 in Brioude) is a French basketball coach. At the 2012 Summer Olympics he coached the France women's national basketball team.

After coaching youth teams within the federation, he took the head of the professional women's team of Bourges Basket from 2003 to 2011, obtaining many trophies, including four titles of French champion. He then joined the men's club of Villeurbanne, then Orléans Loiret Basket, before returning to women's basketball at Famila Schio.

In parallel with his club career, he was appointed coach of the French women's team, a position he held until August 2013. He won the 2009 European Championship in Latvia against Russia, the bronze medal of this competition two years later, then reached the final of the 2012 Summer Olympics in London, against the United States where the French won the silver medal. In 2013, he led the French team to another international medal, silver at the 2013 European Championship held in France.

== Club experience ==
- 2003 - 2011: Bourges Basket
- 2011 - 2014: ASVEL Basket
- 2014 - 2017: Orléans Loiret Basket
- 2017 - 2021: PF Schio
- 2023 - 2024: Virtus Segafredo Bologna women's team

== National Team Experience ==
- 1991 - 1997 : assistant of the U16 French National Team
- 1993 : assistant of the Military French National Team, Bronze medal in the World Championship
- 1997 - 1998 : U18 Women's French National Team
- 1998 - 2002 : U18 Men's French National Team
- 2008 - 2013 : Women's French national Team
- 2024–present : Women's China national Team (assistant)

== Honors ==
=== French National Team ===
==== Women's ====
- Eurobasket Women 2009: Gold Medalist
- Eurobasket Women 2011: Bronze Medalist
- 2012 Summer Olympics: Silver Medalist
- EuroBasket Women 2013: Silver Medalist

==== Youth Teams ====
- Gold Medalist at the 2000 U18 Men's European Championship.

=== Club ===
- 4 Times French Basketball Champion : 2006, 2008, 2009, 2011
- 3 Times Finalist : 2004, 2005, 2007
- 5 Times French Cup Winner : 2005, 2006, 2008, 2009, 2010;
- 3 Times Winner of the Tournoi de la Fédération : 2006, 2007, 2008;
- Twide Italian Basketball Champion : 2018, 2019
- 3 Times Winner of the Italian Supercup: 2018, 2019, 2020
- Twice Winner of the Italian Cup: 2018, 2021

== See also ==
- List of EuroBasket Women winning head coaches
