= Raisa Mamentyeva =

Russian basketball player

Raisa Vladimirovna Mamentyeva
Personal information
- Born: 5 March 1927 Moscow, Soviet Union
- Died: 2 December 2001 (aged 74) Moscow, Russia
- Listed height: 5 ft 4 in (1.63 m)

Raisa Vladimirovna Mamentyeva (Moscow, 5 March 1927 – 2 December 2001) was a Russian basketball player. She won four gold European medals with the Soviet Union women's national basketball team.
