= EuroBasket Women 2023 final =

Belgium	Spain
	1	2	3	4	Total
Belgium	13	12	18	21	64
Spain	17	15	16	10	58
- Date: 25 June 2023
- Venue: Arena Stožice, Ljubljana
- MVP: (Belgium) Kyara Linskens
- Attendance: 1,691

The 2023 FIBA Women's EuroBasket final was played at the Arena Stožice in Ljubljana, Slovenia, on 25 June 2023. Belgium won their first title, winning 64–58 in the final and overturning a 10-point deficit after a strong finish.

== Road to the final ==
Spain
Round
Belgium
Opponent
Result

Opponent
Result
Latvia
63–67
Game 1
Israel
108–59
Montenegro
78–57
Game 2
Czech Republic
84–41
Greece
76–60
Game 3
Italy
72–64

Pos	Team	Pld	Pts
1	Spain	3	5
2	Montenegro	3	5
3	Greece	3	4
4	Latvia	3	4

Source: FIBA
First round

Pos	Team	Pld	Pts
1	Belgium	3	6
2	Czech Republic	3	5
3	Italy	3	4
4	Israel (H)	3	3

Source: FIBA
(H) Hosts
Opponent
Result

Opponent
Result
Bye
Qual. for quarterfinals
Bye
Germany
67–42
Quarterfinals
Serbia
93–53
Hungary
69–60
Semifinals
France
67–63

== Match details ==
25 June 2023
20:00

Boxscore

Spain	58–64	Belgium
Scoring by quarter: 17–13, 15–12, 16–18, 10–21
Pts: Casas 14; Rebs: Carrera 7 Asts: Gil 5		Pts: Meesseman 24; Rebs: Linskens 15; Asts: Allemand 8

Arena Stožice, Ljubljana
Attendance: 1,691
Referees: Maj Forsberg (DEN), Wojciech Liszka (POL), Lorenzo Baldini (ITA)

Starters:			Pts	Reb	Ast
SF	7	Alba Torrens	8	3	0
SF	9	Queralt Casas	14	1	2
PG	12	Maite Cazorla	3	3	0
C	14	Raquel Carrera	12	7	3
PF	24	Laura Gil	4	2	5
Reserves:					
PG	5	Cristina Ouviña	0	6	3
G	6	Silvia Domínguez	0	1	2
SG	11	Leonor Rodríguez	7	1	0
C	20	Paula Ginzo	10	0	1
C	21	Lola Pendande	DNP		
SF	22	María Conde	DNP		
SF	33	Laura Quevedo	0	0	0
Head coach:
Miguel Méndez

Spain	Belgium

Spain	Statistics	Belgium
19/42 (45.2%)	2-pt field goals	15/31 (48.4%)
5/21 (23.8%)	3-pt field goals	4/16 (25%)
5/8 (62.5%)	Free throws	22/25 (88%)
10	Offensive rebounds	10
18	Defensive rebounds	28
28	Total rebounds	38
16	Assists	18
13	Turnovers	20
9	Steals	9
4	Blocks	4
20	Fouls	18

Starters:			Pts	Reb	Ast
SF	6	Antonia Delaere	0	4	1
PF	11	Emma Meesseman	24	8	1
C	13	Kyara Linskens	18	15	2
PG	35	Julie Vanloo	13	3	4
PG	55	Julie Allemand	9	1	8
Reserves:					
PG	4	Elise Ramette	DNP		
SF	10	Laure Résimont	0	0	0
SF	22	Bethy Mununga	0	2	1
C	23	Serena-Lynn Geldof	DNP		
C	25	Becky Massey	0	0	1
SF	31	Maxuelle Lisowa-Mbaka	0	0	0
C	34	Billie Massey	DNP		
Head coach:
(France) Rachid Méziane
