= EuroBasket Women 2011 final =

The EuroBasket Women 2011 final was played at the Arena Łódź in Łódź, Poland, on 3 July 2011, between Russia and Turkey. Russia won the match 59−42 and became European champions. This match was Turkey's first final.

== Road to the final ==
Russia
Round
Turkey

| Team | Pld | W | L | PF | PA | PD | Pts |
|---|---|---|---|---|---|---|---|
| Lithuania | 3 | 2 | 1 | 186 | 179 | +7 | 5 |
| Russia | 3 | 2 | 1 | 212 | 207 | +5 | 5 |
| Turkey | 3 | 1 | 2 | 199 | 204 | −5 | 4 |
| Slovakia | 3 | 1 | 2 | 183 | 190 | −7 | 4 |

First Round

| Team | Pld | W | L | PF | PA | PD | Pts |
|---|---|---|---|---|---|---|---|
| Lithuania | 3 | 2 | 1 | 186 | 179 | +7 | 5 |
| Russia | 3 | 2 | 1 | 212 | 207 | +5 | 5 |
| Turkey | 3 | 1 | 2 | 199 | 204 | −5 | 4 |
| Slovakia | 3 | 1 | 2 | 183 | 190 | −7 | 4 |

| Team | Pld | W | L | PF | PA | PD | Pts |
|---|---|---|---|---|---|---|---|
| Czech Republic | 5 | 4 | 1 | 301 | 286 | +15 | 9 |
| Lithuania | 5 | 4 | 1 | 331 | 298 | +33 | 9 |
| Russia | 5 | 3 | 2 | 326 | 317 | +9 | 8 |
| Turkey | 5 | 2 | 3 | 303 | 313 | −10 | 7 |
| Belarus | 5 | 2 | 3 | 285 | 291 | −6 | 7 |
| Great Britain | 5 | 0 | 5 | 205 | 243 | −38 | 5 |

Second Round

| Team | Pld | W | L | PF | PA | PD | Pts |
|---|---|---|---|---|---|---|---|
| Czech Republic | 5 | 4 | 1 | 301 | 286 | +15 | 9 |
| Lithuania | 5 | 4 | 1 | 331 | 298 | +33 | 9 |
| Russia | 5 | 3 | 2 | 326 | 317 | +9 | 8 |
| Turkey | 5 | 2 | 3 | 303 | 313 | −10 | 7 |
| Belarus | 5 | 2 | 3 | 285 | 291 | −6 | 7 |
| Great Britain | 5 | 0 | 5 | 205 | 243 | −38 | 5 |

Opponent
Result
Playoff Round
Opponent
Result
Latvia
83-72
Quarterfinals
Montenegro
56-44
Czech Republic
86-53
Semifinals
France
68-62

== The match ==
=== Summary ===
The final was played between Russia and Turkey in Arena Łódź, and was followed by about 5,000 spectators. It was Russia's sixth final after the dissolution of the Soviet Union, while Turkey played for the first time in a continental final.

Early in the game the Russians made a decent advantage of 10 points preventing the Turkish players of scoring from outside. The only highlight in the Turkish team was Birsel Vardarlı whose play was enough only by trailing the first quarter by 19–8. In the second period Russia reached a 16-points advantage, followed with a consolidation in the Turkish team who came up with storming triples by Bahar Caglar and Şaziye İvegin-Karslı to cut the gap to five points with a 15–4 run. However the Russians played better at the end and with a triple by Olga Arteshina restored the advantage of the first period with a half-time result of 33–23.

The second half started with an equal play and Russia firmly maintained and even raised their advantage after the third quarter when the result was 46–34 that seemed to be a key for the outcome in the final. The Turkish team couldn't find their play in the whole second half making no impression at all, while the Russians finished the final with another period won. The final result was 59–42 in favor of Russia, and it was Russia's third title in the competition and first since 2007.

=== Details ===
3 July 2011
20:30

Report

| Russia | 59–42 | Turkey |
Scoring by quarter: 19–8, 14–15, 13–11, 13–8
| Pts: Stepanova 18; Rebs: Stepanova 12; Asts: Osipova 4 | | Pts: Vardarlı 10; Rebs: Yılmaz 5 Asts: Vardarlı 4 |

Arena Łódź, Łódź
Attendance: 5,000
Referees: Miguel Anguel Perez Niz (ESP), Ivo Dolinek (CZE), Aleksandar Glisic (SRB)
