= EuroBasket Women 2015 final =

EuroBasket Women 2015 Final
Serbia	France
	1	2	3	4	Total
Serbia	15	18	20	23	76
France	22	10	17	19	68
- Date: 28 June 2015
- Venue: Syma Sport and Events Centre, Budapest
- Attendance: 5,200

The EuroBasket Women 2015 final was played at the Syma Sport and Events Centre in Budapest, Hungary, on 28 June 2015, between Serbia and France.

== Road to the final ==
Serbia
Round
France
Opponent
Result

Opponent
Result
Latvia
76–60
Game 1
Ukraine
79–55
Croatia
89–72
Game 2
Czech Republic
85–75
Great Britain
76–54
Game 3
Romania
76–67
Russia
53–77
Game 4
Montenegro
79–67

Team	Pld	W	L	PF	PA	PD	Pts
Russia	4	3	1	293	223	+70	7
Serbia	4	3	1	294	263	+31	7
Croatia	4	2	2	277	305	−28	6
Latvia	4	2	2	258	263	−5	6
Great Britain	4	0	4	222	290	−68	4

First Round

Team	Pld	W	L	PF	PA	PD	Pts
France	4	4	0	319	264	+55	8
Montenegro	4	3	1	301	263	+38	7
Czech Republic	4	2	2	289	306	−17	6
Ukraine	4	1	3	283	314	−31	5
Romania	4	0	4	270	315	−45	4

Opponent
Result

Opponent
Result
Slovakia
76–74
Game 1
Greece
51–42
Spain
80–91
Game 2
Turkey
56–66
Lithuania
72–73
Game 3
Belarus
64–58

Team	Pld	W	L	PF	PA	PD	Pts
Spain	5	5	0	406	328	+78	10
Lithuania	5	3	2	371	367	+4	8
Russia	5	3	2	366	320	+46	8
Serbia	5	2	3	370	387	−17	7
Slovakia	5	2	3	385	374	+11	7
Croatia	5	0	5	312	434	−122	5

Second Round

Team	Pld	W	L	PF	PA	PD	Pts
Turkey	5	4	1	299	262	+37	9
France	5	4	1	335	308	+27	9
Belarus	5	2	3	349	323	+26	7
Montenegro	5	2	3	319	340	−21	7
Greece	5	2	3	299	328	−29	7
Czech Republic	5	1	4	319	359	−40	6

Opponent
Result

Opponent
Result
Turkey
75–63
Quarterfinals
Russia
77–74
Belarus
74–72
Semifinals
Spain
63–58

== Match details ==
28 June 2015
19:00

Boxscore

Serbia	76–68	France
Scoring by quarter: 15–22, 18–10, 20–17, 23–19
Pts: A. Dabović 25; Rebs: Page 8 Asts: A. Dabović 3		Pts: Gruda 16; Rebs: Yacoubou 6 Asts: Dumerc 5

Syma Sport and Events Centre, Budapest
Attendance: 5,200
Referees: Karen Lasuik (CAN), Anne Panther (GER), Maj Forsberg (DEN)
