= EuroBasket Women 1952 =

EuroBasket 1952 Women
3rd FIBA European Women's Basketball Championship

Tournament details
- Host country: Soviet Union
- Dates: May 18 – May 25
- Teams: 12
- Venue(s): 1 (in 1 host city)

Final positions
- Champions: Soviet Union (2nd title)

Tournament statistics
- Top scorer: (Soviet Union) Mamentieva (24.2)
- PPG (Team): Soviet Union (72.4)

Official website
- Official website (archive)

The 1952 European Women Basketball Championship was the 3rd regional championship held by FIBA Europe for women. The competition was held in Moscow, Soviet Union, on the Central Dynamo Stadium and took place May 18–25, 1952. The Soviet Union won their second gold medal in a row, with Czechoslovakia and Hungary winning silver and bronze, respectively.

== Preliminary round ==
The teams where divided in three groups of 4 squads each, where the first from each group would go on to compete for the gold medal.

=== Group A ===
Pos	Team	Pld	W	L	PF	PA	PD	Pts	Qualification
1	Czechoslovakia	3	3	0	173	119	+54	6	Advance to final round
2	Bulgaria	3	1	2	143	139	+4	4 (Note: Teams ranked by their head-to-head results: Bulgaria 1–1 (+13), France 1–1 (+3), Romania 1–1 (–16))	Advance to 4th–6th round
3	France	3	1	2	138	153	−15	4	Advance to 7th–9th round
4	Romania	3	1	2	90	133	−43	4	Advance to 10th–12th round

Source: Archive FIBA
Rules for classification: 1) Points; 2) Head-to-head results; 3) Points difference; 4) Points scored.
Notes:

May 18, 1952
13:00

Boxscore

Czechoslovakia	56–47	Bulgaria
Scoring by half: 33–22, 23–25
Pts: Hubalkova 21		Pts: Vojnova 27

Moscow

May 18, 1952
17:00

Boxscore

France	45–28	Romania
Scoring by half: 34–15, 11–13
Pts: Biny 16		Pts: Pencz 8

Moscow

May 19, 1952
16:20

Boxscore

Romania	34–33	Bulgaria
Scoring by half: 16–20, 18–13
Pts: Sebestien 12		Pts: Vojnova, Georgieva 7

Moscow

May 19, 1952
17:40

Boxscore

Czechoslovakia	62–44	France
Scoring by half: 30–21, 32–23
Pts: Tomaskova-Staudova 18		Pts: Kloeckner-Tavert 20

Moscow

May 20, 1952
16:50

Boxscore

Czechoslovakia	55–28	Romania
Scoring by half: 36–18, 19–10
Pts: Hubalkova 16		Pts: Zoldi 9

Moscow

May 20, 1952
19:50

Boxscore

France	49–63	Bulgaria
Scoring by half: 24–23, 25–40
Pts: Kloeckner-Tavert 21		Pts: Dzambazova 18

Moscow

=== Group B ===
Pos	Team	Pld	W	L	PF	PA	PD	Pts	Qualification
1	Hungary	3	3	0	216	67	+149	6	Advance to final round
2	Italy	3	2	1	128	110	+18	5	Advance to 4th–6th round
3	Austria	3	1	2	89	150	−61	4	Advance to 7th–9th round
4	Finland	3	0	3	77	183	−106	3	Advance to 10th–12th round

Source: Archive FIBA
Rules for classification: 1) Points; 2) Head-to-head results; 3) Points difference; 4) Points scored.

May 18, 1952

Boxscore

Italy	18–58	Hungary
Scoring by half: 5–29, 13–29
Pts: three players 4		Pts: Pirik-Blahone 19

Moscow

May 18, 1952
14:20

Boxscore

Austria	44–21	Finland
Scoring by half: 25–18, 19–3
Pts: Ivan 23		Pts: Lamminpaa 10

Moscow

May 19, 1952
12:20

Boxscore

Finland	28–79	Hungary
Scoring by half: 13–38, 15–41
Pts: Eskelinen 9		Pts: Pirik-Blahone 28

Moscow

May 19, 1952
15:00

Boxscore

Italy	50–24	Austria
Scoring by half: 30–17, 20–7
Pts: Bradamante 10		Pts: Dambock 11

Moscow

May 20, 1952
12:20

Boxscore

Italy	60–28	Finland
Scoring by half: 25–15, 35–13
Pts: L. Ronchetti, Bradamante 14		Pts: Koiso-Kanttila

Moscow

May 20, 1952
13:50

Boxscore

Hungary	79–21	Austria
Scoring by half: 38–14, 41–7
Pts: Nagy 25		Pts: Dambock, Ivan 8

Moscow

=== Group C ===
Pos	Team	Pld	W	L	PF	PA	PD	Pts	Qualification
1	Soviet Union (H)	3	3	0	301	42	+259	6	Advance to final round
2	Poland	3	2	1	162	98	+64	5	Advance to 4th–6th round
3	Switzerland	3	1	2	87	152	−65	4	Advance to 7th–9th round
4	East Germany	3	0	3	24	282	−258	3	Advance to 10th–12th round

Source: Archive FIBA
Rules for classification: 1) Points; 2) Head-to-head results; 3) Points difference; 4) Points scored.
(H) Hosts

May 18, 1952
15:40

Switzerland	22–40	Poland
Scoring by half: 10–23, 12–17
Pts: Chevalier 8		Pts: Zakrzewska 13

Moscow

May 18, 1952
18:20

East Germany	4–133	Soviet Union
Scoring by half: 2–65, 2–68
Pts: Hellmann 3		Pts: Mamentieva 31

Moscow, Central Dynamo Stadium
Attendance: 20 000

May 19, 1952
13:40

Switzerland	53–8	East Germany
Scoring by half: 25–3, 28–5
Pts: Bose 11		Pts: Hellmann 3

Moscow

May 19, 1952
19:00

Soviet Union	64–26	Poland
Scoring by half: 30–15, 34–11
Pts: Mamentieva 36		Pts: Zakrzewska 5

Moscow

May 20, 1952
15:20

East Germany	12–96	Poland
Scoring by half: 6–44, 6–52
Pts: Petersohn 6		Pts: Zakrzewska 24

Moscow

May 20, 1952
18:20

Switzerland	12–104	Soviet Union
Scoring by half: 3–60, 9–44
Pts: Pfeuti 3		Pts: Moiseeva 17

Moscow

== Final round ==
Four new groups were formed, with the three 1st, 2nd, 3rd and 4th places from each group to determine the final standings.

=== 1st to 3rd Place ===
Pos	Team	Pld	W	L	PF	PA	PD	Pts	Qualification
1	Soviet Union (H)	2	2	0	123	70	+53	4	Champions
2	Czechoslovakia	2	1	1	94	88	+6	3	
3	Hungary	2	0	2	77	136	−59	2	

Source: Archive FIBA
Rules for classification: 1) Points; 2) Head-to-head results; 3) Points difference; 4) Points scored.
(H) Hosts

May 22, 1952
19:00

Boxscore

Czechoslovakia	65–36	Hungary
Scoring by half: 27–19, 38–17
Pts: Hubalkova 32		Pts: Pirik-Blahone 11

Moscow

May 23, 1952
19:00

Boxscore

Hungary	41–71	Soviet Union
Scoring by half: 20–36, 21–35
Pts: Nagy 11		Pts: Moiseeva 20

Moscow

May 25, 1952
16:00

Boxscore

Czechoslovakia	29–52	Soviet Union
Scoring by half: 22–29, 7–23
Pts: Hubalkova 7		Pts: Mamentieva 27

Moscow, Central Dynamo Stadium
Attendance: 30 000

=== 4th to 6th Place ===
Pos	Team	Pld	W	L	PF	PA	PD	Pts
4	Bulgaria	2	2	0	120	81	+39	4
5	Poland	2	1	1	78	105	−27	3
6	Italy	2	0	2	80	92	−12	2

Source: Archive FIBA
Rules for classification: 1) Points; 2) Head-to-head results; 3) Points difference; 4) Points scored.

May 22, 1952
17:40

Boxscore

Poland	42–35	Italy
Scoring by half: 27–24, 15–11
Pts: Rogowska-Markowska 16		Pts: Baitz 13

Moscow

May 23, 1952
17:40

Boxscore

Italy	45–50	Bulgaria
Scoring by half: 20–29, 25–21
Pts: Baitz 9		Pts: Vojnova, Dzambazova 11

Moscow

May 25, 1952
14:40

Boxscore

Poland	36–70	Bulgaria
Scoring by half: 20–36, 16–34
Pts: Rogowska-Markowska 11		Pts: Vojnova 35

Moscow

=== 7th to 9th Place ===
Pos	Team	Pld	W	L	PF	PA	PD	Pts
7	France	2	2	0	98	49	+49	4
8	Switzerland	2	1	1	65	71	−6	3
9	Austria	2	0	2	43	86	−43	2

Source: Archive FIBA
Rules for classification: 1) Points; 2) Head-to-head results; 3) Points difference; 4) Points scored.

May 22, 1952
16:20

Boxscore

Austria	25–34	Switzerland
Scoring by half: 9–15, 16–19
Pts: Ivan 7		Pts: Tirfor, Bose 7

Moscow

May 23, 1952
16:20

Boxscore

Austria	18–52	France
Scoring by half: 9–17, 9–35
Pts: Dambock 6		Pts: Kloeckner-Tavert 26

Moscow

May 25, 1952
13:20

Boxscore

Switzerland	31–46	France
Scoring by half: 9–25, 22–21
Pts: Bose 16		Pts: Golhen 15

Moscow

=== 10th to 12th Place ===
Pos	Team	Pld	W	L	PF	PA	PD	Pts
10	Romania	2	2	0	118	50	+68	4
11	Finland	2	1	1	80	68	+12	3
12	East Germany	2	0	2	42	122	−80	2

Source: Archive FIBA
Rules for classification: 1) Points; 2) Head-to-head results; 3) Points difference; 4) Points scored.

May 22, 1952
15:00

Boxscore

Finland	45–27	East Germany
Scoring by half: 19–13, 26–14
Pts: Lamminpaa 12		Pts: Kalitzki 9

Moscow

May 23, 1952
15:00

Boxscore

East Germany	15–77	Romania
Scoring by half: 7–44, 8–33
Pts: Limburg 5		Pts: Niculescu 21

Moscow

May 25, 1952
12:00

Boxscore

Finland	35–41	Romania
Scoring by half: 16–14, 19–27
Pts: Hakola 14		Pts: Sebestien 14

Moscow

== Final ranking ==
Qualified for the 1953 FIBA World Championship for Women

Rank	Team	Record
Gold medal	Soviet Union	5–0
Silver medal	Czechoslovakia	4–1
Bronze medal	Hungary	3–2
4th	Bulgaria	3–2
5th	Poland	3–2
6th	Italy	2–3
7th	France	3–2
8th	Switzerland	2–3
9th	Austria	1–4
10th	Romania	3–2
11th	Finland	1–4
12th	East Germany	0–5
