= Lucas Mondelo =

Spanish basketball coach

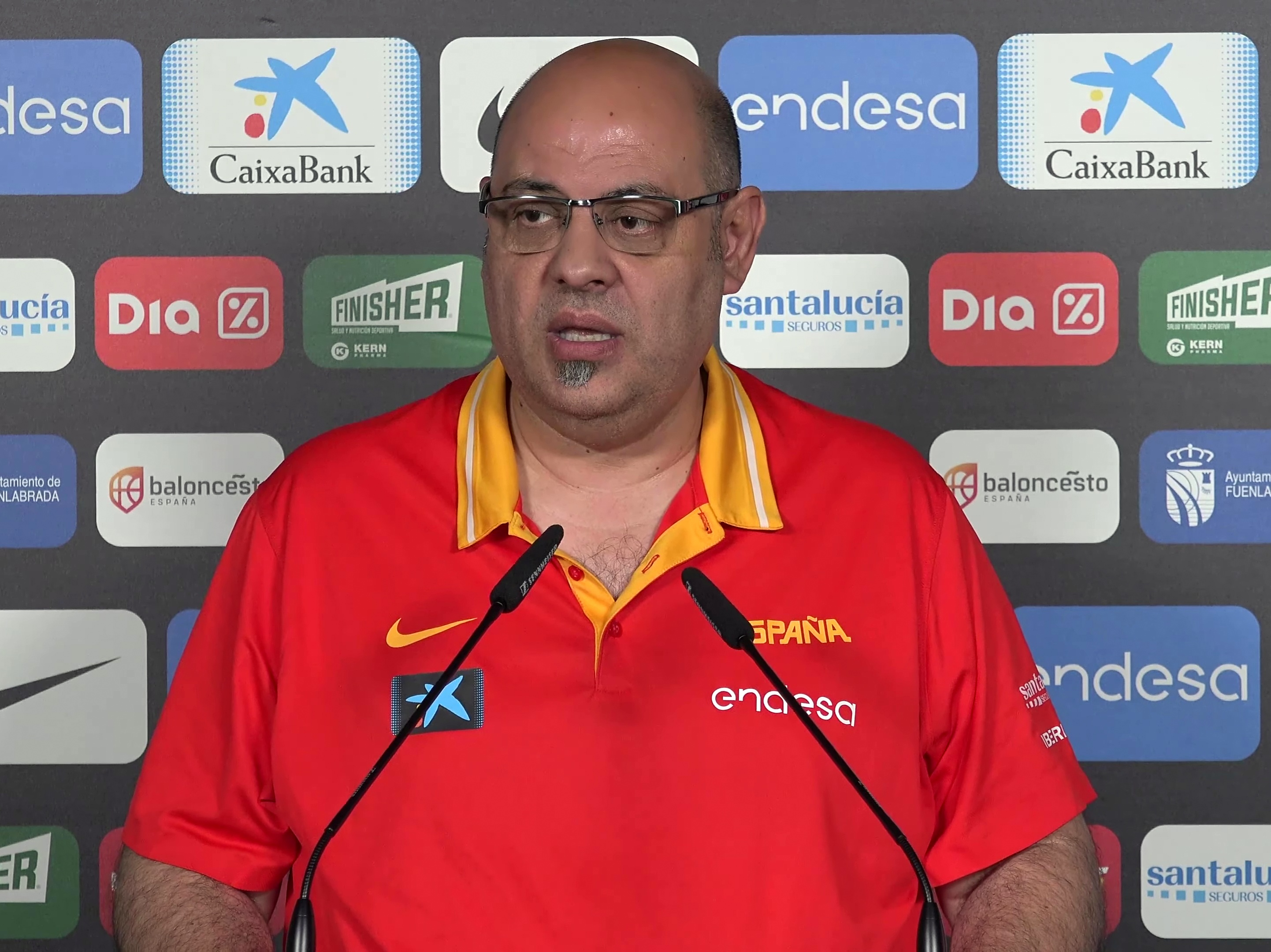

Toyota Antelopes
- Position: Head coach
- League: Women's Japan Basketball League,

Personal information
- Born: 28 July 1967 (age 59) Barcelona, Spain
- Coaching career: 2006–present

Career history

Coaching
- 2006–2010: Olesa
- 2010–2012: Avenida
- 2012–2016: Shanxi Flame
- 2013–2021: Spain
- 2016–2018: Dynamo Kursk
- 2018-present: Toyota Antelopes

Career highlights
- 2× EuroLeague Women champion (2011, 2017); Spanish League champion (2011); 3× Chinese League champion (2013, 2014, 2015); Spanish Cup champion (2012); Russian Cup champion (2018); Japanese League champion (2021)

Lucas Mondelo García (born 28 July 1967) is a Spanish basketball coach for Toyota Antelopes. He was also the head coach of the Spain women's national team from 2012 to 2021.

== Coach career ==
As a club coach, Mondelo first coached professionally at Club Bàsquet Olesa from Olesa de Montserrat in the season 2006-07, promoting to the first tier league in his first year. In 2010 he signed for one of the strongest teams in Spain, Perfumerías Avenida, winning the 2011 Spanish League, the 2010–11 EuroLeague Women and the 2012 Spanish Cup. He had his first experience abroad in China, coaching the newly-promoted Shanxi Xing Rui Flame, and winning three times the Chinese women's championship. In 2016, he signed with Russian club Dynamo Kursk, winning the 2017 EuroLeague with an 18-0 record and the 2018 Russian Cup. Mondelo was deprived of more titles by UMMC Ekaterinburg, being runner-up to them in the 2017, 2018 and 2019 Russian League, as well as being defeated at the 2018 EuroLeague and the 2019 EuroLeague Final Fours.

== International career ==
In 2009, Mondelo coached the under-19 women's team. The team achieved the silver medal in the 2009 World Championship. In 2010, Mondelo became manager of the Spanish women's under-20 team. He led the team to the silver medal in the 2010 Under-20 European championship and also to win the 2011 edition.

Mondelo became the Spanish women's team national coach in 2012, after the team failed to qualify for the 2012 London Olympics. He coached the senior national team to seven consecutive medals from 2013 to 2019:

- 2009 FIBA Under-19 World Championship (youth)
- 2010 FIBA Europe Under-20 Championship (youth)
- 2011 FIBA Europe Under-20 Championship (youth)
- 2013 Eurobasket
- 2014 World Championship
- 2015 Eurobasket
- 2016 Summer Olympics
- 2017 Eurobasket
- 2018 World Championship
- 2019 Eurobasket

In October 2020, Mondelo announced that he will remain as head coach of the team through the Paris 2024 Olympics.

== See also ==
- List of EuroBasket Women winning head coaches
