= Aleksandr Voynov =

Russian footballer

Personal information
- Full name: Aleksandr Vyacheslavovich Voynov
- Date of birth: 28 October 1993 (age 32)
- Height: 1.81 m (5 ft 11 in)
- Position: Midfielder

Senior career*
Years	Team	Apps	(Gls)
2012–2024	FC Avangard Kursk	285	(14)
- * Club domestic league appearances and goals

Aleksandr Vyacheslavovich Voynov (Russian: Александр Вячеславович Войнов; born 28 October 1993) is a Russian former football midfielder.

== Club career ==
He made his debut in the Russian Second Division for FC Avangard Kursk on 16 July 2012 in a game against FC Metallurg Vyksa. He made his Russian Football National League debut for Avangard on 8 July 2017 in a game against FC Olimpiyets Nizhny Novgorod.
