= EuroBasket Women 1960 =

EuroBasket 1960 Women
7th FIBA European Women's Basketball Championship

Tournament details
- Host country: Bulgaria
- Dates: June 3–11
- Teams: 10
- Venue: 1 (in 1 host city)

Final positions
- Champions: Soviet Union (5th title)

Official website
- Official website (archive)

The 1960 European Women's Basketball Championship was the 7th regional championship held by FIBA Europe for women. The competition was held in Sofia, Bulgaria and took place June 3–11, 1960. The Soviet Union won the gold medal, while hosts Bulgaria received the silver. Czechoslovakia won the bronze medal.

== Preliminary round ==
The teams where divided into two groups. The first three from each group would go to the Final Round. The remaining teams went to the Classification Round to determine the 7th–10th spots.

=== Group A ===
Rank	Team	W	L	Pts	Diff
1	Soviet Union	4	0	8	+153
2	Yugoslavia	3	1	7	−6
3	Romania	2	2	6	−14
4	Hungary	1	3	5	−48
5	Belgium	0	4	4	−85

June 3
16:00

Romania 55, Hungary 46
Scoring by half: 27–18, 28–28
Pts: Kraus (12)	Pts: Kalo (13)

June 3
17:00

Soviet Union 78, Yugoslavia 35
Scoring by half: 29–18, 49–17
Pts: Kostikova (14)	Pts: Mrak (13)

June 4
17:45

Soviet Union 89, Belgium 44
Scoring by half: 43–18, 46–26
Pts: Eremina (20)	Pts: Van Geert (13)

June 4
20:15

Yugoslavia 56, Hungary 50
Scoring by half: 32–26, 24–24
Pts: Radovanovic (20)	Pts: Mogyorosi-Korenne (12)

June 5
16:30

Hungary 53, Belgium 41
Scoring by half: 28–16, 25–25
Pts: Noficzer (16)	Pts: Vanderheyden (8)

June 5
20:15

Yugoslavia 59, Romania 46
Scoring by half: 27–22, 32–24
Pts: Kalusevic (21)	Pts: Firimide-Racovita (13)

June 6
18:30

Belgium 38, Romania 48
Scoring by half: 23–19, 15–29
Pts: Vanderheyden (11)	Pts: Ivanovici (10)

June 6
19:45

Hungary 32, Soviet Union 77
Scoring by half: 16–35, 16–42
Pts: Kalo-Laborczne (10)	Pts: Kostikova (21)

June 7
16:30

Belgium 39, Yugoslavia 57
Scoring by half: 20–21, 19–36
Pts: Sey (13)	Pts: Mrak (16)

June 7
17:45

Romania 40, Soviet Union 60
Scoring by half: 18–30, 22–30
Pts: Marian (10)	Pts: Kostikova (15)

=== Group B ===
Rank	Team	W	L	Pts	Diff
1	Bulgaria	4	0	8	+91
2	Czechoslovakia	3	1	7	+76
3	Poland	2	2	6	−11
4	Italy	1	3	5	−41
5	Netherlands	0	4	4	−115

June 3
19:30

Bulgaria 87, Netherlands 39
Scoring by half: 53–19, 34–20
Pts: Borisova (20)	Pts: Wink-Duyf (7)

June 3
20:30

Czechoslovakia 64, Poland 49
Scoring by half: 19–33, 45–16
Pts: Hubalkova (24)	Pts: Kapalczynska-Roga (18)

June 4
16:30

Poland 55, Netherlands 36
Scoring by half: 28–15, 27–21
Pts: Kapalczynska-Roga (14)	Pts: Van Der Heyden (9)

June 4
19:00

Italy 40, Czechoslovakia 71
Scoring by half: 21–35, 19–36
Pts: Ronchetti (12)	Pts: Hubalkova (17)

June 5
17:45

Netherlands 42, Italy 58
Scoring by half: 22–27, 20–31
Pts: Van Der Heyden (10)	Pts: Geroni (11)

June 5
19:00

Bulgaria 66, Poland 45
Scoring by half: 31–22, 35–23
Pts: Popova (18)	Pts: Pabianczyk-Likszo (7)

June 6
16:00

Czechoslovakia 76, Netherlands 44
Scoring by half: 37–29, 39–15
Pts: Hubalkova (12)	Pts: Wink-Duyf (11)

June 6
17:15

Bulgaria 55, Italy 35
Scoring by half: 32–12, 23–23
Pts: Calaskanova (13)	Pts: Ronchetti (10)

June 7
19:00

Bulgaria 53, Czechoslovakia 51
Scoring by half: 22–22, 31–29
Pts: Popova (19)	Pts: Hubalkova (22)

June 7
20:15

Poland 51, Italy 45
Scoring by half: 26–16, 25–29
Pts: Szostak (16)	Pts: Ronchetti (15)

== Classification round ==
Rank	Team	W	L	Pts	Diff
1	Italy	3	0	6	+29
2	Netherlands	2	1	5	+3
3	Hungary	1	2	4	+1
4	Belgium	0	3	3	−33

The results from the following matches were carried over to this round:

- Italy vs. Netherlands
- Hungary vs. Belgium

June 9
8:30

Italy 49, Belgium 37
Scoring by half: 28–22, 21–15
Pts: Ronchetti (20)	Pts: Blancke (10)

June 9
9:45

Hungary 38, Netherlands 48
Scoring by half: 21–24, 17–24
Pts: Kalo (11)	Pts: De Groot (13)

June 10
8:30

Netherlands 53, Belgium 44
Scoring by half: 28–27, 25–17
Pts: De Groot (13)	Pts: Blancke (9)

June 11
8:30

Italy 56, Hungary 55 (OT)
Scoring by half: 28–31, 22–19 Overtime: 6–5
Pts: Ronchetti (16pts)	Pts: Kalo (16pts)

== Final round ==
Rank	Team	W	L	Pts	Diff
1	Soviet Union	5	0	10	+112
2	Bulgaria	4	1	9	+44
3	Czechoslovakia	3	2	8	+73
4	Poland	2	3	7	−69
5	Yugoslavia	1	4	6	-66
6	Romania	0	5	5	−94

The results from the following matches carried over to this round:

- Soviet Union vs. Yugoslavia
- Soviet Union vs. Romania
- Czechoslovakia vs. Bulgaria
- Czechoslovakia vs. Poland
- Poland vs. Bulgaria
- Yugoslavia vs. Romania

June 9
17:00

Poland 50, Romania 45
Scoring by half: 28–24, 22–21
Pts: Kapalczynska-Roga (18pts)	Pts: Antonescu-Niculescu (9pts)

June 9
18:15

Bulgaria 47, Yugoslavia 45
Scoring by half: 25–22, 22–23
Pts: Popova (16)	Pts: Mrak (18)

June 9
19:30

Soviet Union 58, Czechoslovakia 56
Scoring by half: 30–28, 28–28
Pts: Smildzinia-Budovska (15)	Pts: Hubalkova (16)

June 10
17:00

Bulgaria 72, Romania 51
Scoring by half: 35–21, 37–30
Pts: Popova (11)	Pts: Antonescu-Niculescu (16)

June 10
18:15

Soviet Union 71, Poland 26
Scoring by half: 36–10, 35–16
Pts: Nikitina (14)	Pts: Rospondek-Sokul (13)

June 10
19:30

Czechoslovakia 74, Yugoslavia 47
Scoring by half: 35–28, 39–19
Pts: Mazlova-Adamirova (16)	Pts: Kalusevic (12)

June 11
16:00

Czechoslovakia 74, Romania 39
Scoring by half: 44–16, 30–23
Pts: Trojkova-Sulcova (13)	Pts: Firimide-Racovita (9)

June 11
17:15

Yugoslavia 45, Poland 52
Scoring by half: 28–24, 17–28
Pts: Radovanovic (17)	Pts: Kapalczynska-Roga (17)

June 11
18:30

Soviet Union 52, Bulgaria 50 (OT)
Scoring by half: 13–22, 32–23 Overtime: 7–5
Pts: Smildzinia-Budovska (15)	Pts: Borisova (14)

== Final standings ==
Rank	Team	Record
1	Soviet Union	7–0
2	Bulgaria	6–1
3	Czechoslovakia	5–2
4	Poland	4–3
5	Yugoslavia	3–4
6	Romania	2–5
7	Italy	3–3
8	Netherlands	2–4
9	Hungary	1–5
10	Belgium	0–6
