= Skaidrīte Smildziņa-Budovska =

Latvian basketball player

Personal information
- Born: 2 March 1943 (age 83) Riga, Latvia
- Listed height: 1.90 m (6 ft 3 in)
- Listed weight: 85 kg (187 lb)
- Position: Center

Career history
- 1958–1972: TTT Riga

Career highlights
- 11× EuroLeague Women champion (1960–1962, 1964–1969, 1971–1972)
- FIBA Hall of Fame

Skaidrīte Smildziņa-Budovska (born 2 March 1943 in Riga) is a Latvian former basketball player. She spent all her career in TTT Riga (captain from 1963 till 1969). Smildziņa-Budovska played for Latvian SSR and Soviet Union national basketball team.

Smildziņa-Budovska won 11 FIBA Women's European Champions Cups (1960–1962, 1964–1969, 1971–1972) with TTT Riga, 3 World Championships (1959, 1964, 1967) and 5 European Championships (1960, 1962, 1964, 1966, 1968) with the Soviet Union national team.
