= EuroBasket Women 1954 =

1954 Women's Basketball Championship: Belgrade, Yugoslavia

EuroBasket 1954 Women
4th FIBA European Women's Basketball Championship

Tournament details
- Host country: Yugoslavia
- Dates: June 4–13
- Teams: 10
- Venue: 1 (in 1 host city)

Final positions
- Champions: Soviet Union (3rd title)

Official website
- Official website (archive)

The 1954 European Women's Basketball Championship was the 4th regional championship held by FIBA Europe for women. The competition was held in Belgrade, Yugoslavia and took place June 4–13, 1954. The Soviet Union clinched their third consecutive gold medal, with Czechoslovakia and Bulgaria winning silver and bronze, respectively.

== Preliminary round ==
The teams where divided in two groups of three and one group of four. The first two from each group would go to the Final Round that determined the first six places. The remaining teams went to the Classification Round to determine the seventh-to-tenth spots.

=== Group A ===
Rank	Team	W	L	Pts	Diff
1	Hungary	2	1	5	+40
2	France	2	1	5	+74
3	Italy	2	1	5	+10
4	Austria	0	3	3	−124

France 92, Austria 21
Scoring by half: 41–14, 51–7

Italy 52, Hungary 50
Scoring by half: 27–31, 25–19

Hungary 69, Austria 34
Scoring by half: 38–18, 31–16

France 51, Italy 41
Scoring by half: 17–19, 34–22

Italy 38, Austria 20
Scoring by half: 21–11, 17–9

Hungary 34, France 27
Scoring by half: 16–15, 18–12

=== Group B ===
Rank	Team	W	L	Pts	Diff
1	Soviet Union	2	0	4	+100
2	Yugoslavia	1	1	3	+50
3	Germany	0	2	2	−150

Yugoslavia (Socialist Federal Republic of Yugoslavia) 69, Germany 14
Scoring by half: 32–8, 37–6

Soviet Union 48, Yugoslavia 43
Scoring by half: 20–21, 28–22

Soviet Union 106, Germany 11
Scoring by half: 57–0, 49–11

=== Group C ===
Rank	Team	W	L	Pts	Diff
1	Bulgaria	2	0	4	+66
2	Czechoslovakia	1	1	3	+39
3	Denmark	0	2	2	−105

Czechoslovakia 76, Denmark 19
Scoring by half: 36–7, 40–12

Bulgaria 68, Denmark 20
Scoring by half: 35–14, 33–6

Bulgaria 78, Czechoslovakia 60
Scoring by half: 41–33, 37–27

== Classification round ==
Rank	Team	W	L	Pts	Diff
1	Italy	3	0	6	+97
2	Austria	2	1	5	−36
3	Germany	1	2	4	−21
4	Denmark	0	3	3	−40

Austria 33, Germany 25
Scoring by half: 15–8, 18–17

Italy 57, Denmark 34
Scoring by half: 32–8, 25–26

Germany 33, Denmark 21
Scoring by half: 15–10, 18–11

Italy 60, Germany 35
Scoring by half: 25–16, 35–19

Italy 73, Austria 24
Scoring by half: 31–11, 42–13

Austria 33, Denmark 28
Scoring by half: 14–13, 19–15

== Final round ==
Rank	Team	W	L	Pts	Diff
1	Soviet Union	5	0	10	+106
2	Czechoslovakia	4	1	9	+39
3	Bulgaria	3	2	8	+34
4	Hungary	2	3	7	−28
5	Yugoslavia	1	4	6	−96
6	France	0	5	5	−55

Soviet Union 60, France 48
Scoring by half: 36–18, 24–30

Czechoslovakia 48, Hungary 38
Scoring by half: 29–12, 19–26

Bulgaria 55, Yugoslavia 30
Scoring by half: 27–10, 28–20

Bulgaria 49, France 37
Scoring by half: 26–22, 23–15

Hungary 62, Yugoslavia 50
Scoring by half: 30–21, 32–29

Soviet Union 69, Czechoslovakia 62
Scoring by half: 41–35, 28–27

Czechoslovakia 71, France 56
Scoring by half: 33–33, 38–23

Soviet Union 81, Yugoslavia 32
Scoring by half: 47–18, 34–14

Bulgaria 56, Hungary 43
Scoring by half: 25–19, 31–24

Czechoslovakia 68, Yugoslavia 54
Scoring by half: 33–18, 35–36

Soviet Union 65, Bulgaria 56
Scoring by half: 31–27, 34–29

Hungary 58, France 46
Scoring by half: 27–22, 31–24

Yugoslavia (Socialist Federal Republic of Yugoslavia) 54, France 50
Scoring by half: 18–24, 36–26

Soviet Union 76, Hungary 47
Scoring by half: 43–24, 33–23

Czechoslovakia 57, Bulgaria 50
Scoring by half: 27–22, 30–28
