= EuroBasket Women 1962 =

EuroBasket 1962 Women
8th FIBA European Women's Basketball Championship

Tournament details
- Host country: France
- Dates: September 22–29
- Teams: 10
- Venue: 1 (in 1 host city)

Final positions
- Champions: Soviet Union (6th title)

Official website
- Official website (archive)

The 1962 European Women's Basketball Championship was the 8th regional championship held by FIBA Europe for women. The competition was held in Mulhouse, France and took place on September 22–29, 1962. The Soviet Union won their sixth gold medal (third in a row) while Czechoslovakia and Bulgaria won silver and bronze, respectively.

== Preliminary round ==
The teams where divided into two groups. The first two from each group would advance to the bracket that defined the first four places. The system to determine the 5th–10th places consisted in three final matches between teams that had the same position in both groups.

=== Group A ===
Rank	Team	W	L	Pts	Diff
1	Soviet Union	4	0	8	+120
2	Czechoslovakia	3	1	7	+87
3	Yugoslavia	2	2	6	−17
4	Hungary	1	3	5	−76
5	Italy	0	4	4	−114

September 22
16:30

Italy 37, Czechoslovakia 86
Scoring by half: 8–42, 29–44
Pts: Tarabocchia (10)	Pts: Hubalkova (12)

September 22
20:30

Yugoslavia 47, Hungary 40
Scoring by half: 20–16, 27–24
Pts: Radovanovic (14)	Pts: Hegedos-Krizsan (14)

September 23
15:00

Czechoslovakia 53, Yugoslavia 35
Scoring by half: 29–19, 24–16
Pts: Joskova-Malotova (12)	Pts: Radovanovic (10)

September 23
16:30

Soviet Union 77, Italy 31
Scoring by half: 39–11, 38–20
Pts: Liutsepp-Kaasik (13)	Pts: Ronchetti (12)

September 24
15:00

Yugoslavia 39, Soviet Union 52
Scoring by half: 20–31, 19–21
Pts: Kalusevic (13)	Pts: Liutsepp-Kaasik (17)

September 24
16:30

Hungary 52, Czechoslovakia 74
Scoring by half: 24–41, 28–33
Pts: Mogyorosi-Korenne (9)	Pts: Hubalkova (14)

September 25
15:00

Soviet Union 88, Hungary 29
Scoring by half: 41–13, 47–16
Pts: Liutsepp-Kaasik (13)	Pts: Hegedos-Krizsan (8)

September 25
20:30

Italy 43, Yugoslavia 50
Scoring by half: 22–22, 21–28
Pts: Tarabocchia (14)	Pts: Kalusevic (16)

September 26
16:30

Hungary 55, Italy 43
Scoring by half: 23–12, 32–31
Pts: Kovacs (18)	Pts: Pausich (11)

September 26
22:00

Czechoslovakia 49, Soviet Union 51 (OT)
Scoring by half: 21–22, 22–21 Overtime: 6–8
Pts: Sourkova (12)	Pts: Smildzinia-Budovska (23)

=== Group B ===
Rank	Team	W	L	Pts	Diff
1	Bulgaria	4	0	8	+94
2	Romania	3	1	7	+40
3	Poland	2	2	6	+18
4	France	1	3	5	−42
5	Belgium	0	4	4	−110

September 22
15:00

Poland 52, Belgium 25
Scoring by half: 26–18, 26–7
Pts: Chlodzinska-Urbaniak (13)	Pts: Blancke (8)

September 22
22:00

Bulgaria 55, France 26
Scoring by half: 33–6, 22–20
Pts: Gospodinova (18)	Pts: Stephan (8)

September 23
20:30

France 42, Poland 58
Scoring by half: 19–33, 23–25
Pts: Verots (8)	Pts: Szydlowska (12)

September 23
22:00

Romania 42, Bulgaria 44
Scoring by half: 23–27, 19–17
Pts: Ivanovici (12)	Pts: Borisova (24)

September 24
20:30

Belgium 44, France 54
Scoring by half: 21–28, 23–26
Pts: Declercq (11)	Pts: Cator (14)

September 24
22:00

Poland 35, Romania 38
Scoring by half: 19–20, 16–18
Pts: Szostak (17)	Pts: Ivanovici (16)

September 25
16:30

Romania 72, Belgium 40
Scoring by half: 39–20, 33–20
Pts: Marian (21)	Pts: Declercq (12)

September 25
22:00

Bulgaria 60, Poland 38
Scoring by half: 25–18, 35–20
Pts: Gospodinova (13)	Pts: Chlodzinska-Urbaniak (10)

September 26
16:30

Belgium 36, Bulgaria 77
Scoring by half: 17–37, 19–40
Pts: Blancke (7)	Pts: Antonova (14)

September 26
22:00

France 43, Romania 50 (OT)
Scoring by half: 19–21, 19–17 Overtime: 5–12
Pts: Stephan (14)	Pts: Ivanovici (16)

== Classification ==
=== 5th place match ===
September 29
15:00

Yugoslavia 52, Poland 44
Scoring by half: 29–23, 23–21
Pts: Kalusevic (16)	Pts: Szostak (17)

=== 7th place match ===
September 28
16:30

Hungary 66, France 60
Scoring by half: 34–24, 32–36
Pts: Hegedos-Krizsan (25)	Pts: Stephan (18)

=== 9th place match ===
September 28
15:00

Italy 32, Belgium 27
Scoring by half: 20–13, 12–14
Pts: Persi (8)	Pts: Vanderveken (12)

== Medal Bracket ==
Semifinals
September 28 – 20:00
Bulgaria	51
Czechoslovakia	54
September 28 – 20:30
Soviet Union	69
Romania	29

Final place
September 29 – 20:30
Czechoslovakia	46
Soviet Union	63
Bronze medal
September 29 – 16:30
Bulgaria	48
Romania	36

September 28
20:00

Bulgaria 51, Czechoslovakia 54
Scoring by half: 26–24, 25–30
Pts: Borisova (20)	Pts: Joskova-Malotova (12)

September 28
20:30

Soviet Union 69, Romania 29
Scoring by half: 31–15, 38–14
Pts: Smildzinia-Budovska (17)	Pts: Marian (8)

September 29
16:30

Bulgaria 48, Romania 36
Scoring by half: 29–8, 19–28
Pts: Gospodinova (18)	Pts: Firimide-Racovita (13)

September 29
20:30

Czechoslovakia 46, Soviet Union 63
Scoring by half: 20–39, 26–24
Pts: Joskova-Malotova (10)	Pts: Smildzinia-Budovska (13)

== Final standings ==
Rank	Team	Record
1	Soviet Union	6–0
2	Czechoslovakia	4–2
3	Bulgaria	5–1
4	Romania	3–3
5	Yugoslavia	3–2
6	Poland	2–3
7	Hungary	2–3
8	France	1–4
9	Italy	1–4
10	Belgium	0–5
