= Montenegro women's national basketball team results =

The Montenegro women's national basketball team is the representative for Montenegro in international women's basketball competitions and it is organized and run by the Basketball Federation of Montenegro.
The Montenegrin women's national team entered international competition in 2008, playing its first official match on August 27, against Republic of Ireland in Bijelo Polje (68-56).
Montenegrin women's team participated on EuroBasket Women seven times - 2011, 2013, 2015, 2017, 2019, 2021 and 2023, playing three times in quarterfinals.

== List of official matches ==
Win Loss

Date	Opponent	Result	Venue	Att	Competition
27/08/2008	Ireland	68–56	Bijelo Polje	1,500	Div B
30/08/2008	Switzerland	60–50	Bijelo Polje	1,000	Div B
03/09/2008	Netherlands	82–80	Bijelo Polje	1,000	Div B
06/09/2008	Slovenia	74–69	Kranjska Gora	700	Div B
10/09/2008	Iceland	92–72	Bijelo Polje	1,000	Div B
15/08/2009	Ireland	70–67	Dublin	1,200	Div B
30/08/2008	Switzerland	76–46	Neuchâtel	500	Div B
22/08/2009	Netherlands	70–61	Almere	1,000	Div B
26/08/2009	Slovenia	71–47	Nikšić	1,500	Div B
29/08/2009	Iceland	72–67	Kópavogur	500	Div B
05/09/2009	Portugal	61–53	Coimbra	500	Div B
09/09/2009	Portugal	64–59	Nikšić	1,000	Div B
02/08/2010	Hungary	76–65	Miskolc	500	ECQ
08/08/2010	Bulgaria	68–66	Cetinje	1,000	ECQ
10/08/2010	Finland	94–55	Espoo	600	ECQ
14/08/2010	Turkey	70–52	Cetinje	1,500	ECQ
17/08/2010	Hungary	75–73	Cetinje	1,500	ECQ
23/08/2010	Bulgaria	57–89	Ruse	700	ECQ
26/08/2010	Finland	89–61	Cetinje	800	ECQ
29/08/2010	Turkey	65–72	Konya	1,500	ECQ
18/06/2011	Poland	70–53	Katowice	4,000	EuroBasket 2011
19/06/2011	Spain	66–57	Katowice	500	EuroBasket 2011
20/06/2011	Germany	76–64	Katowice	300	EuroBasket 2011
22/06/2011	Croatia	81–60	Katowice	300	EuroBasket 2011
24/06/2011	France	73–68	Katowice	800	EuroBasket 2011
26/06/2011	Latvia	74–70	Katowice	600	EuroBasket 2011
30/06/2011	Turkey	44–56	Łódź	1,000	EuroBasket 2011
01/07/2011	Lithuania	68–59	Łódź	300	EuroBasket 2011
02/07/2011	Croatia	59–73	Łódź	1,000	EuroBasket 2011
13/06/2012	Serbia	85–68	Cetinje	1,500	ECQ
16/06/2012	Switzerland	82–67	Fribourg	300	ECQ
20/06/2012	Poland	59–50	Cetinje	1,000	ECQ
23/06/2012	Estonia	86–54	Tallinn	250	ECQ
30/06/2012	Serbia	56–72	Belgrade	2,000	ECQ
04/07/2012	Switzerland	69–39	Cetinje	1,200	ECQ
07/07/2012	Poland	50–53	Wrocław	1,500	ECQ
11/07/2012	Estonia	81–61	Cetinje	1,000	ECQ
15/06/2013	Slovakia	77–63	Vannes	1,000	EuroBasket 2013
16/06/2013	Turkey	57–66	Vannes	1,100	EuroBasket 2013
17/06/2013	Ukraine	72–60	Vannes	800	EuroBasket 2013
20/06/2013	Sweden	58–69	Lille	500	EuroBasket 2013
22/06/2013	Spain	50–66	Lille	1,700	EuroBasket 2013
24/06/2013	Italy	60–66	Lille	1,200	EuroBasket 2013
08/06/2014	Germany	63–52	Cetinje	1,000	ECQ
11/06/2014	Germany	60–48	Hagen	800	ECQ
15/06/2014	Finland	75–72	Cetinje	1,000	ECQ
18/06/2014	Finland	82–62	Helsinki	400	ECQ
23/06/2014	Ukraine	71–75	Cetinje	600	ECQ
25/06/2014	Ukraine	76–70	Cetinje	600	ECQ
11/06/2015	Czech Republic	71–52	Timișoara	300	EuroBasket 2015
12/06/2015	Romania	79–61	Timișoara	1,000	EuroBasket 2015
14/06/2015	Ukraine	84–71	Timișoara	400	EuroBasket 2015
15/06/2015	France	67–79	Timișoara	600	EuroBasket 2015
17/06/2015	Turkey	41–61	Debrecen	200	EuroBasket 2015
19/06/2015	Belarus	77–72	Debrecen	300	EuroBasket 2015
21/06/2015	Greece	63–76	Debrecen	350	EuroBasket 2015
25/06/2015	Spain	74–75	Budapest	1,500	EuroBasket 2015
26/06/2015	Russia	65–73	Budapest	500	EuroBasket 2015
27/06/2015	Lithuania	89–77	Budapest	1,000	EuroBasket 2015
21/11/2015	Great Britain	78–64	Podgorica	1,200	ECQ
25/11/2015	Albania	99–39	Podgorica	700	ECQ
20/02/2016	Italy	56–57	Schio	2,500	ECQ
24/02/2016	Great Britain	67–71	Manchester	500	ECQ
19/11/2016	Albania	114–56	Tirana	500	ECQ
23/11/2016	Italy	66–57	Podgorica	1,200	ECQ
16/06/2017	Belgium	64–66	Prague	700	EuroBasket 2017
17/06/2017	Latvia	55–76	Prague	700	EuroBasket 2017
19/06/2017	Russia	54–78	Prague	800	EuroBasket 2017
11/11/2017	Iceland	62–84	Reykjavík	500	ECQ
15/11/2017	Bosnia and Herzegovina	76–55	Podgorica	850	ECQ
10/02/2018	Slovakia	72–73	Podgorica	500	ECQ
14/02/2018	Iceland	69–37	Podgorica	400	ECQ
17/11/2018	Bosnia and Herzegovina	68–83	Sarajevo	700	ECQ
21/11/2018	Slovakia	82–68	Ružomberok	500	ECQ
28/05/2019	Cyprus	80–39	Bar	400	GSS
29/05/2019	Iceland	81–73	Bar	300	GSS
30/05/2019	Malta	86–40	Bar	350	GSS
31/05/2019	Luxembourg	68–49	Bar	300	GSS
01/06/2019	Monaco	56–46	Bar	200	GSS
27/06/2019	Sweden	51–67	Riga	700	EuroBasket 2019
28/06/2019	France	53–88	Riga	300	EuroBasket 2019
30/06/2019	Czech Republic	70–57	Riga	500	EuroBasket 2019
01/07/2019	Great Britain	71–92	Riga	300	EuroBasket 2019
17/11/2019	Sweden	55-68	Malmö	1,500	ECQ
12/11/2020	Israel	73-66	Heraklion	-	ECQ
04/02/2021	Sweden	69-67	Podgorica	-	ECQ
06/02/2021	Israel	78-52	Podgorica	-	ECQ
17/06/2021	Greece	70–55	Valencia	900	EuroBasket 2021
18/06/2021	Italy	61–77	Valencia	150	EuroBasket 2021
20/06/2021	Serbia	75–87	Valencia	1,000	EuroBasket 2021
21/06/2021	Spain	51-78	Valencia	2,700	EuroBasket 2021
14/11/2021	Austria	70-60	Schwechat	500	ECQ
24/11/2022	Denmark	60-67	Gentofte	1,500	ECQ
09/02/2022	Austria	65-48	Podgorica	500	ECQ
12/02/2022	Denmark	81-84	Podgorica	1,200	ECQ
30/05/2023	Luxembourg	64–52	Ta' Qali	100	GSS
31/05/2023	Malta	59–42	Ta' Qali	400	GSS
01/06/2023	Cyprus	59–63	Ta' Qali	100	GSS
02/06/2023	Cyprus	78–44	Ta' Qali	150	GSS
03/06/2023	Luxembourg	74–61	Ta' Qali	300	GSS
15/06/2023	Greece	74–69	Tel Aviv	100	EuroBasket 2023
16/06/2023	Spain	57–78	Tel Aviv	100	EuroBasket 2023
18/06/2023	Latvia	61–58	Tel Aviv	100	EuroBasket 2023
20/06/2023	Italy	63–49	Tel Aviv	100	EuroBasket 2023
22/06/2023	France	46–89	Ljubljana	400	EuroBasket 2023
24/06/2023	Serbia	58–63	Ljubljana	200	EuroBasket 2023

ECQ - FIBA EuroBasket qualifiers; Div B - FIBA Division B; GSS - Games of the Small States of Europe
As of September 22, 2023.

== Montenegro vs. other countries ==
Below is the list of performances of Montenegro national basketball team against every single opponent.

Opponents' country	G	W	L	PD
Albania	2	2	0	+118
Austria	2	2	0	+27
Belarus	1	1	0	+5
Belgium	1	0	1	-2
Bosnia and Herzegovina	2	1	1	+6
Bulgaria	2	1	1	-30
Croatia	2	1	1	+7
Czech Republic	2	2	0	+32
Cyprus	3	2	1	+71
Denmark	2	1	1	+4
Estonia	2	2	0	+52
Finland	4	4	0	+90
France	4	1	3	-85
Germany	3	3	0	+35
Great Britain	3	1	2	-17
Greece	3	2	1	+7
Hungary	2	2	0	+13
Iceland	5	5	0	+87
Ireland	2	2	0	+15
Israel	2	2	0	+33
Italy	5	2	3	0
Latvia	3	2	1	-14
Lithuania	2	2	0	+21
Luxembourg	3	3	0	+44
Malta	2	2	0	+63
Monaco	1	1	0	+10
Netherlands	2	2	0	+11
Poland	3	2	1	+23
Portugal	2	2	0	+13
Romania	1	1	0	+18
Russia	2	0	2	-32
Serbia	4	1	3	-16
Slovakia	3	2	1	+27
Slovenia	2	2	0	+29
Spain	5	1	4	-56
Sweden	4	1	3	-36
Switzerland	4	4	0	+85
Turkey	5	1	4	-30
Ukraine	4	3	1	+27
Overall	106	71	35	+653

Last update: September 22, 2023.

== See also ==
- Montenegro women's national basketball team
- Sport in Montenegro
- Sport in Montenegro
- Montenegro national basketball team
