= EuroBasket Women 2025 qualification =

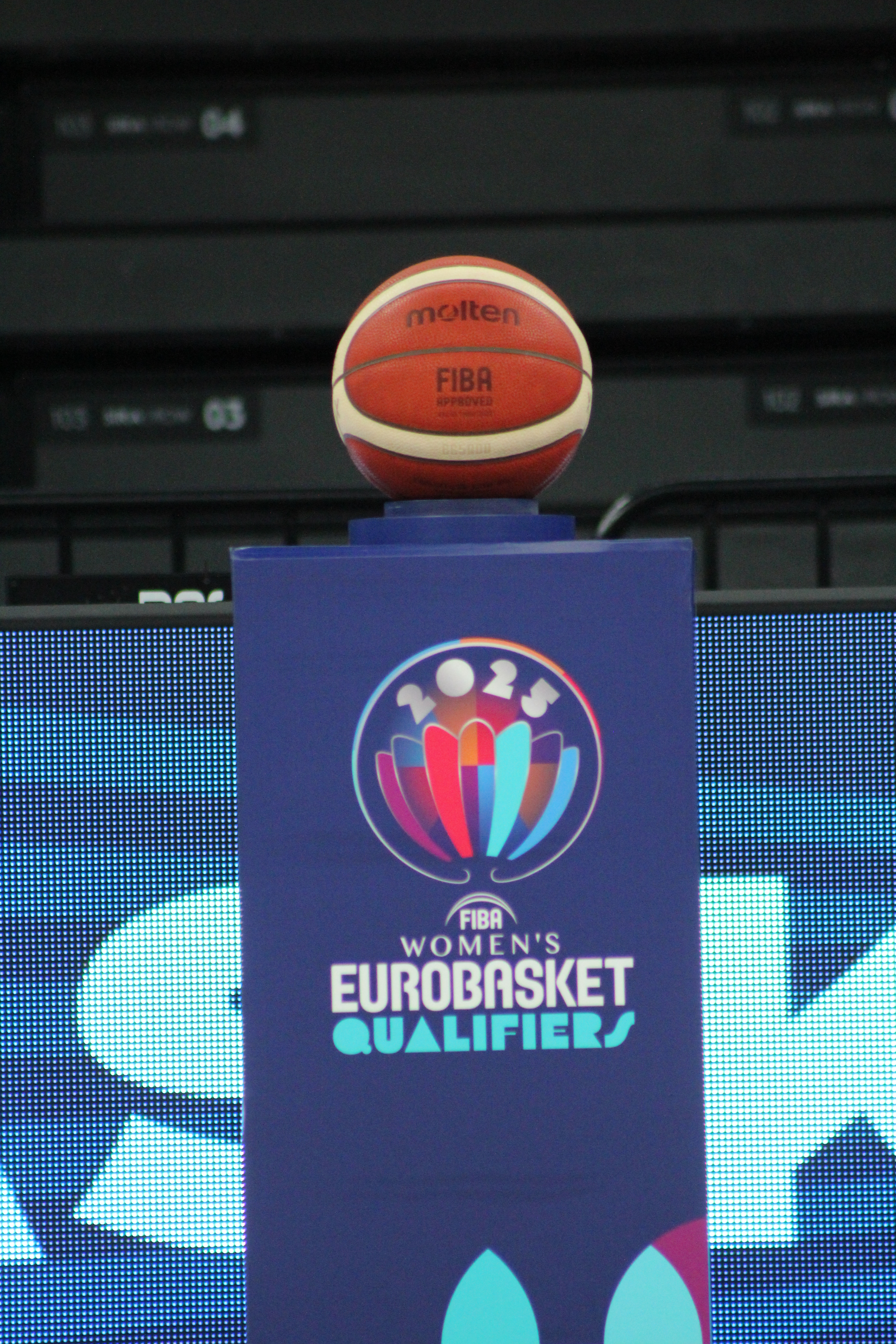
EuroBasket Women 2025 qualification ball

The EuroBasket Women 2025 qualification was held from November 2023 to February 2025 to decide the 12 teams to join the co-hosts Czech Republic, Germany, Greece and Italy. It featured 36 teams split in eight groups of four teams. The eight group winners and the four best second-ranked teams qualified for the final tournament. The four co-hosts were placed in the same group.

== Qualified teams ==
Team	Qualification method	Date of qualification	Appearance(s)				Previous best performance	WR
Team	Qualification method	Date of qualification	Total	First	Last	Streak	Previous best performance	WR
Czech Republic	Host nation	8 September 2023	16th	1995	2023	16	Champions (2005)	21
Germany	Host nation	8 September 2023	17th	1954	2023	2	Third place (1997)	13
Greece	Host nation	8 September 2023	11th	2001	2023	2	Fourth place (2017)	18
Italy	Host nation	8 September 2023	35th	1938	2023	7	Champions (1938)	16
Sweden	Group D winner	10 November 2024	9th	1978	2021	1	Sixth place (2019)	27
Turkey	Group F winner	10 November 2024	11th	2005	2023	11	Runners-up (2011)	17
France	Group E winner	6 February 2025	35th	1938	2023	14	Champions (2001, 2013)	3
Spain	Group A winner	6 February 2025	23th	1974	2023	13	Champions (1993, 2013, 2017, 2019)	5
Serbia	Group G winner	6 February 2025	11th	2003	2023	7	Champions (2015, 2021)	9
Belgium	Group C winner	9 February 2025	15th	1950	2023	5	Champions (2023)	6
Great Britain	Four best runners up	9 February 2025	6th	2011	2023	2	Fourth place (2019)	23
Lithuania	Four best runners up	9 February 2025	12th	1995	2015	1	Champions (1997)	45
Montenegro	Group H winner	9 February 2025	8th	2011	2023	8	Sixth place (2011)	22
Portugal	Four best runners up	9 February 2025	1st	Debut				46
Slovenia	Group B winner	9 February 2025	5th	2017	2023	5	Tenth place (2019, 2021)	25
Switzerland	Four best runners up	9 February 2025	4th	1938	1956	1	Fifth place (1938)	65

== Draw ==
The draw took place on 19 September 2023. The bold text indicates who qualified.

=== Seeding ===
Teams were seeded according to FIBA rankings.

Pot 1
Team	Pos
Spain	4
Belgium	6
France	7
Serbia	10

Pot 2
Team	Pos
Turkey	14
Bosnia and Herzegovina	17
Hungary	19
Great Britain	21

Pot 3
Team	Pos
Montenegro	24
Slovenia	26
Sweden	27
Slovakia	28

Pot 4
Team	Pos
Latvia	29
Ukraine	34
Croatia	36
Poland	44

Pot 5
Team	Pos
Lithuania	46
Portugal	48
Israel	49
Netherlands	50

Pot 6
Team	Pos
Romania	54
Denmark	56
Bulgaria	58
Switzerland	60

Pot 7
Team	Pos
Iceland	65
Finland	66
Luxembourg	68
Estonia	69

Pot 8
Team	Pos
North Macedonia	75
Ireland	80
Austria	85
Azerbaijan	NR

== Groups ==
All times are local.

=== Group A ===
Pos	Team	Pld	W	L	PF	PA	PD	Pts	Qualification
1	Spain	6	6	0	446	329	+117	12	Final tournament
2	Croatia	6	4	2	456	407	+49	10	
3	Netherlands	6	2	4	382	422	−40	8	
4	Austria	6	0	6	318	444	−126	6	

Updated to match(es) played on 9 February 2025. Source: FIBA
Rules for classification: 1) Points; 2) Head-to-head; 3) Points difference; 4) Points scored.

9 November 2023	Croatia	65–70	Spain	Split
18:00	Scoring by quarter: 19–16, 15–16, 11–15, 20–23
	Pts: Bura 15; Rebs: Bura 8 Asts: three players 4	Boxscore	Pts: Conde 12; Rebs: Casas 7 Asts: Cazorla 5	Arena: Arena Gripe; Attendance: 300; Referees: Viola Györgyi (ROU), Paulina Gajdosz (POL), Andrea Bongiorni (ITA)

9 November 2023	Netherlands	64–45	Austria	Amsterdam
19:30	Scoring by quarter: 20–4, 11–13, 18–15, 15–16
	Pts: Hof 14; Rebs: Hof 18; Asts: Westerik 5	Boxscore	Pts: Zderadicka 9 Rebs: three players 5 Asts: Fuchs-Robetin 3	Arena: Sporthallen Zuid; Attendance: 1,500; Referees: Martin Van Hoye (BEL), Kate Unsworth (GBR), Marion Ortis (FRA)

12 November 2023	Spain	75–34	Austria	Tenerife
13:00	Scoring by quarter: 20–9, 23–8, 15–8, 17–9
	Pts: Ginzo 16; Rebs: Gil 11; Asts: Domínguez 5	Boxscore	Pts: Schicher 10; Rebs: Schicher 9 Asts: Fuchs-Robetin, Koizar 2	Arena: Pabellón Insular Santiago Martín; Attendance: 2,350; Referees: José Pedroso (POR), James Dominique (GIB), Laure Coanus (FRA)

12 November 2023	Croatia	81–57	Netherlands	Split
18:00	Scoring by quarter: 31–14, 26–15, 6–15, 18–13
	Pts: Slonjšak 16; Rebs: Zellous 9 Asts: Lazić 8	Boxscore	Pts: Hof 14; Rebs: Hof 14; Asts: Westerik 7	Arena: Arena Gripe; Attendance: 300; Referees: Amel Dahra (FRA), Valentin Oliot (FRA), Veronika Obertová (SVK)

7 November 2024	Austria	80–91	Croatia	Vienna
20:20	Scoring by quarter: 23–21, 18–27, 21–18, 18–25
	Pts: Allesch, Sagerer 15; Rebs: Allesch 14; Asts: Koizar 7	Boxscore	Pts: Cvitković 26; Rebs: Begić 11; Asts: Begić 4	Arena: Hallmann Dome; Attendance: 1,000; Referees: Silvia Marziali (ITA), Petr Blahout (CZE), Viktor Nagy (HUN)

7 November 2024	Spain	66–59	Netherlands	Castellón de la Plana
21:00	Scoring by quarter: 16–7, 15–18, 19–16, 16–18
	Pts: Conde 17; Rebs: Fam 10; Asts: Ortiz 5	Boxscore	Pts: Hof 19; Rebs: Hof 12; Asts: Cornelius 4	Arena: Pabellón Ciutat de Castelló; Attendance: 950; Referees: Emma Perry (IRL), Chess Van Looy (BEL), Ana Costa (POR)

10 November 2024	Austria	57–73	Netherlands	Vienna
18:00	Scoring by quarter: 23–25, 10–11, 6–17, 18–20
	Pts: Sagerer 20; Rebs: Koizar 8 Asts: Koizar, Sagerer 3	Boxscore	Pts: Driessen 18; Rebs: Hof 11; Asts: Cornelius 8	Arena: Hallmann Dome; Attendance: 800; Referees: Armin Mutapcic (GER), Irene Frosolini (ITA), Stefan Kuburović (MNE)

10 November 2024	Spain	78–62	Croatia	Castellón de la Plana
19:00	Scoring by quarter: 18–18, 25–16, 21–16, 14–12
	Pts: Ginzo 15; Rebs: Ginzo 8 Asts: Cazorla 8	Boxscore	Pts: Cvitković 24; Rebs: Begić 11; Asts: Slonjšak 8	Arena: Pabellón Ciutat de Castelló; Attendance: 1,900; Referees: Ewa Matuszewska (POL), Edgard Ceccarelli (FRA), Tolga Edis (TUR)

6 February 2025	Austria	45–76	Spain	Vienna
19:00	Scoring by quarter: 17–28, 10–15, 8–16, 10–17
	Pts: Sagerer 11; Rebs: Koizar 4 Asts: Koizar 4	Boxscore	Pts: Gustafson 18; Rebs: Fam 8 Asts: Cazorla 6	Arena: Hallmann Dome; Attendance: 500; Referees: Ivana Ivanović (SRB), Nataša Dragojević (MNE), Alexandra Subernetcaia (MDA)

6 February 2025	Netherlands	65–92	Croatia	Almere
19:30	Scoring by quarter: 19–19, 20–29, 16–19, 10–25
	Pts: Hof 22; Rebs: Hof 8 Asts: Cornelius 5	Boxscore	Pts: Zellous 29; Rebs: Slonjšak 8 Asts: Lazić 6	Arena: Topsportcentrum; Attendance: 500; Referees: Cecília Tóth (HUN), Valentin Oliot (FRA), Marek Kúkelčík (SVK)

9 February 2025	Netherlands	64–81	Spain	Almere
14:30	Scoring by quarter: 15–19, 16–17, 13–28, 20–17
	Pts: Cornelius 14; Rebs: Hof 12; Asts: Cornelius 10	Boxscore	Pts: Gustafson 27; Rebs: Gustafson 11; Asts: Martín 3	Arena: Topsportcentrum; Referees: Çisil Güngör (TUR), Martin Van Hoye (BEL), Kristīne Simanoviča (LAT)

9 February 2025	Croatia	65–57	Austria	Gospić
19:30	Scoring by quarter: 26–11, 13–8, 16–19, 10–19
	Pts: Zellous 18; Rebs: Slonjšak, Tadić 9 Asts: Zellous 6	Boxscore	Pts: Sagerer 15; Rebs: Fuchs-Robetin 10; Asts: Koizar 5	Arena: Gradska Sportska Dvorana; Referees: Özlem Yalman (TUR), Balázs Mészáros (HUN), Valerio Grigioni (ITA)

=== Group B ===
Pos	Team	Pld	W	L	PF	PA	PD	Pts	Qualification
1	Slovenia	6	5	1	477	392	+85	11	Final tournament
2	Hungary	6	3	3	441	406	+35	9	
3	Finland	6	2	4	375	464	−89	8 (Note: Finland 4 Pts, Bulgaria 2 Pts.)	
4	Bulgaria	6	2	4	458	489	−31	8	

Source: FIBA
Rules for classification: 1) Points; 2) Head-to-head; 3) Points difference; 4) Points scored.
Notes:

9 November 2023	Hungary	70–51	Slovenia	Sopron
18:00	Scoring by quarter: 25–19, 15–9, 18–9, 12–14
	Pts: Kiss 16; Rebs: Goree, Juhász 8 Asts: Studer 6	Boxscore	Pts: Lisec 26; Rebs: Friškovec 6 Asts: Krošelj 4	Arena: Aréna Sopron; Attendance: 1,200; Referees: Esperanza Mendoza (ESP), Martina Mekelová (SVK), Peter Ženiš (SVK)

9 November 2023	Bulgaria	65–75	Finland	Samokov
19:00	Scoring by quarter: 24–23, 11–10, 8–17, 22–25
	Pts: Hristova 27; Rebs: G. Ivanova 6 Asts: Hristova 4	Boxscore	Pts: Kuier 27; Rebs: Kuier 11; Asts: Lahtinen 5	Arena: Arena Samokov; Attendance: 1,200; Referees: Ivana Ivanović (SRB), Ewa Matuszewska (POL), Milita Stalaučinskaitė (LTU)

12 November 2023	Finland	56–67	Hungary	Helsinki
16:00	Scoring by quarter: 13–15, 15–16, 15–15, 13–21
	Pts: Kuier 17; Rebs: Kuier 10; Asts: Koskimies, Lahtinen 4	Boxscore	Pts: three players 11; Rebs: Juhász 7 Asts: Lelik 5	Arena: Urheahalli; Attendance: 1,150; Referees: Jelena Tomić (CRO), Ivana Radinović (MNE), Aurimas Borusas (LTU)

12 November 2023	Slovenia	78–63	Bulgaria	Ljubljana
17:30	Scoring by quarter: 14–17, 21–19, 27–16, 16–11
	Pts: Lisec 28; Rebs: Lisec 7 Asts: Friškovec 6	Boxscore	Pts: Hristova 25; Rebs: Hristova 5 Asts: Ivanova, Nikolova 2	Arena: Kodeljevo Hall; Attendance: 600; Referees: Jan Baloun (CZE), Andrea Bongiorni (ITA), Sandra Sánchez (ESP)

7 November 2024	Hungary	68–83	Bulgaria	Miskolc
18:00	Scoring by quarter: 23–20, 10–31, 18–15, 17–17
	Pts: Juhász 21; Rebs: Juhasz 9 Asts: Lelik 5	Boxscore	Pts: Hristova 25; Rebs: Hillsman 12; Asts: Konstantinova 9	Arena: DVTK Arena; Attendance: 1,500; Referees: Nataša Dragojević (MNE), Anna Belousova (LAT), Bogna Podkowińska (POL)

7 November 2024	Finland	62–84	Slovenia	Helsinki
18:30	Scoring by quarter: 15–18, 17–18, 15–25, 15–23
	Pts: Kuier 17; Rebs: Kuier 11; Asts: Lehtoranta 4	Boxscore	Pts: Shepard 29; Rebs: Shepard 23; Asts: Jelenc 5	Arena: Urheahalli; Attendance: 1,000; Referees: Paulina Gajdosz (POL), Davíð Tómasson (ISL), Sara Månsson (SWE)

10 November 2024	Finland	85–72	Bulgaria	Helsinki
17:00	Scoring by quarter: 27–21, 32–7, 12–32, 14–12
	Pts: Kuier 30; Rebs: Kuier 11; Asts: Bejedi 9	Boxscore	Pts: Hillsman 22; Rebs: Hillsman 10; Asts: G. Ivanova 7	Arena: Urheahalli; Attendance: 1,083; Referees: Nikola Bejat (NOR), Martina Fanfara (SVK), Blazo Begenesic (SWE)

10 November 2024	Slovenia	74–67	Hungary	Ljubljana
18:00	Scoring by quarter: 19–18, 20–16, 13–14, 22–19
	Pts: Friškovec 23; Rebs: Shepard 17; Asts: three players 4	Boxscore	Pts: Határ 15; Rebs: Juhász 9 Asts: Lelik 6	Arena: Kodeljevo Hall; Attendance: 800; Referees: Veronika Obertová (SVK), Çisil Güngör (TUR), Nikolaos Tziopanos (GRE)

6 February 2025	Hungary	80–50	Finland	Miskolc
18:00	Scoring by quarter: 20–8, 19–13, 24–9, 17–20
	Pts: Turner 16; Rebs: Juhász 11; Asts: Kányási 7	Boxscore	Pts: Kuier 15; Rebs: Tulonen 6 Asts: Kuier, Lahtinen 4	Arena: DVTK Arena; Attendance: 2,100; Referees: Jelena Tomić (CRO), Maria Ignatiou (CYP), Aleksandar Radonjić (BIH)

6 February 2025	Bulgaria	83–94	Slovenia	Botevgrad
19:00	Scoring by quarter: 24–23, 21–23, 17–23, 21–25
	Pts: Hillsman 24; Rebs: Hillsman 9 Asts: Konstantinova 7	Boxscore	Pts: Lisec 21; Rebs: Lisec 8 Asts: Friškovec 7	Arena: Arena Botevgrad; Attendance: 1,000; Referees: Silvia Marziali (ITA), Tolga Edis (TUR), Ioannis Tsibouris (GRE)

9 February 2025	Slovenia	96–47	Finland	Ljubljana
18:00	Scoring by quarter: 21–14, 18–14, 33–4, 24–15
	Pts: Shepard 20; Rebs: Shepard 12; Asts: Lisec 5	Boxscore	Pts: Kuier 17; Rebs: Aijanen, Kuier 6 Asts: Onnela 4	Arena: Kodeljevo Hall; Referees: Andrea Bongiorni (ITA), Can Mavisu (TUR), Dennis Sirowi (GER)

9 February 2025	Bulgaria	92–89(OT)	Hungary	Botevgrad
19:00	Scoring by quarter: 18–22, 16–19, 23–16, 21–21, Overtime: 14–11
	Pts: Hillsman, Hristova 24; Rebs: Hillsman 13; Asts: Konstantinova 7	Boxscore	Pts: Turner 19; Rebs: Turner 10; Asts: Lelik 6	Arena: Arena Botevgrad; Referees: Duhan Köyiçi (TUR), Amal Dahra (FRA), Ilias Karpanos (GRE)

=== Group C ===
Pos	Team	Pld	W	L	PF	PA	PD	Pts	Qualification
1	Belgium	6	5	1	526	335	+191	11	Final tournament
2	Lithuania	6	4	2	493	402	+91	10	Final tournament
3	Poland	6	3	3	479	374	+105	9	
4	Azerbaijan	6	0	6	246	633	−387	6	

Source: FIBA
Rules for classification: 1) Points; 2) Head-to-head; 3) Points difference; 4) Points scored.

8 November 2023	Belgium	62–67	Poland	Antwerp
20:30	Scoring by quarter: 14–18, 10–18, 20–13, 18–18
	Pts: Meesseman 16; Rebs: Linskens 9 Asts: Allemand 7	Boxscore	Pts: Mavunga 21; Rebs: Telenga 9 Asts: Gajda 10	Arena: Sportpaleis; Attendance: 3,800; Referees: Sonia Teixeira (POR), Suzana Vujičić (MNE), Edgard Ceccarelli (FRA)

9 November 2023	Lithuania	99–62	Azerbaijan	Vilnius
19:30	Scoring by quarter: 22–18, 24–19, 30–11, 23–14
	Pts: Labuckienė 20; Rebs: Miškinienė 10; Asts: Donskichytė 6	Boxscore	Pts: Fraser 24; Rebs: Mollenhauer 10; Asts: Deniskina 8	Arena: Jeep Arena; Attendance: 550; Referees: Andrada Csender (ROU), Joona Haaja (FIN), Sara Månsson (SWE)

12 November 2023	Azerbaijan	28–136	Belgium	Baku
14:00	Scoring by quarter: 6–25, 4–38, 6–39, 12–34
	Pts: Mollenhauer, Ulyanova 7 Rebs: Mollenhauer 5 Asts: Deniskina 2	Boxscore	Pts: Meesseman 31; Rebs: Meesseman 11; Asts: Vanloo 14	Arena: Sarkhadchi Sport Center; Attendance: 500; Referees: Kirile Tvauri (GEO), Marina Shalamberidze (GEO), Aikaterini Asimakaki (GRE)

12 November 2023	Poland	73–75(OT)	Lithuania	Katowice
16:15	Scoring by quarter: 28–15, 14–17, 10–20, 14–14, Overtime: 7–9
	Pts: Mavunga 18; Rebs: Mavunga 10; Asts: Niemojewska 7	Boxscore	Pts: Petronytė 25; Rebs: three players 5 Asts: Petronytė 7	Arena: Hala Szopienice; Attendance: 1,250; Referees: Esperanza Mendoza (ESP), Veronika Vávrová (CZE), Aleksandar Radonjić (BIH)

7 November 2024	Poland	105–51	Azerbaijan	Sosnowiec
20:30	Scoring by quarter: 32–16, 32–15, 20–10, 21–10
	Pts: Mavunga 18; Rebs: Borkowska 10; Asts: Niemojewska 7	Boxscore	Pts: Mollenhauer 24; Rebs: Mollenhauer, Ulyanova 5 Asts: Carter 3	Arena: Zagłębie Sports Park; Attendance: 600; Referees: Josh Bowe (GBR), Kristīne Simanoviča (LAT), Marija Ćirić (SRB)

7 November 2024	Belgium	81–70	Lithuania	Antwerp
20:45	Scoring by quarter: 19–15, 22–20, 25–14, 15–21
	Pts: Meesseman 17; Rebs: Meesseman 7 Asts: Allemand 9	Boxscore	Pts: Juškaitė 18; Rebs: Labuckienė 7 Asts: Donskichytė 7	Arena: Sportpaleis; Attendance: 10,614; Referees: Ariadna Chueca (ESP), Gavin Williams (GBR), Tijmen Last (NED)

10 November 2024	Azerbaijan	47–108	Lithuania	Sosnowiec, Poland
17:00	Scoring by quarter: 16–23, 13–30, 13–24, 5–31
	Pts: Carter 23; Rebs: Mollenhauer 8 Asts: Carter 4	Boxscore	Pts: Jocytė, Juškaitė 17; Rebs: Miškinienė 15; Asts: Miškinienė 7	Arena: Zagłębie Sports Park; Attendance: 100; Referees: Veronika Vávrová (CZE), Denys Povorozniuk (UKR), Yurii Shcherbak (UKR)

10 November 2024	Poland	77–80	Belgium	Sosnowiec
20:30	Scoring by quarter: 17–17, 24–15, 16–24, 20–24
	Pts: Skobel 22; Rebs: Mavunga 11; Asts: Gajda 10	Boxscore	Pts: Meesseman 29; Rebs: Meesseman 8 Asts: Allemand 7	Arena: Zagłębie Sports Park; Attendance: 1,700; Referees: Cecília Tóth (HUN), Elvis Binders-Čoders (LAT), Ioannis Agrafiotis (GRE)

6 February 2025	Lithuania	72–69	Poland	Vilnius
18:30	Scoring by quarter: 18–22, 22–13, 16–15, 16–19
	Pts: Juškaitė 17; Rebs: Miškinienė 8 Asts: Miškinienė 3	Boxscore	Pts: Skobel 18; Rebs: Gertchen, Mavunga 6 Asts: Gajda 8	Arena: Jeep Arena; Attendance: 2,350; Referees: Özlem Yalman (TUR), Edgard Ceccarelli (FRA), Ritvars Helmšteins (LAT)

6 February 2025	Belgium	97–24	Azerbaijan	Ostend
20:15	Scoring by quarter: 27–5, 25–7, 29–4, 16–8
	Pts: Linskens 17; Rebs: Linskens 12; Asts: Vanloo 9	Boxscore	Pts: Akbingol, Mollenhauer 7 Rebs: Akbingol 6 Asts: Mollenhauer 3	Arena: COREtec Dôme; Attendance: 4,999; Referees: Emma Perry (IRL), Lynn Weiwers (LUX), Alexandre Maret (FRA)

9 February 2025	Lithuania	69–70	Belgium	Vilnius
15:00	Scoring by quarter: 13–15, 25–20, 17–13, 14–22
	Pts: Jocytė 22; Rebs: Jocytė 6 Asts: Jocytė 6	Boxscore	Pts: Vanloo 17; Rebs: Linskens 11; Asts: Meesseman 7	Arena: Twinsbet Arena; Referees: Viola Györgyi (ROU), Zdenko Tomašovič (SVK), Rainis Värv (EST)

9 February 2025	Azerbaijan	34–88	Poland	Baku
17:00	Scoring by quarter: 2–18, 13–21, 11–32, 8–17
	Pts: Mollenhauer 16; Rebs: Akbingol 9 Asts: three players 2	Boxscore	Pts: Mielnicka, Pyka 15; Rebs: Telenga 18; Asts: Gajda 8	Arena: Sarkhadchi Sport Center; Referees: Nikolaos Tziopanos (GRE), Polat Parlak (TUR), Marina Shalamberidze (GEO)

=== Group D ===
Pos	Team	Pld	W	L	PF	PA	PD	Pts	Qualification
1	Sweden	6	6	0	453	366	+87	12	Final tournament
2	Great Britain	6	4	2	448	334	+114	10	Final tournament
3	Denmark	6	1	5	400	443	−43	7 (Note: Denmark 3 Pts, +20 PD; Estonia 3 Pts, −20 PD)	
4	Estonia	6	1	5	309	467	−158	7	

Source: FIBA
Rules for classification: 1) Points; 2) Head-to-head; 3) Points difference; 4) Points scored.
Notes:

9 November 2023	Denmark	81–53	Estonia	Gentofte
19:00	Scoring by quarter: 18–14, 21–13, 28–12, 14–14
	Pts: Jespersen 18; Rebs: Hesseldal 10; Asts: Jespersen, Seilund 4	Boxscore	Pts: Pokk 10; Rebs: three players 5 Asts: Adams 4	Arena: Gentofte Sportspark; Attendance: 1,200; Referees: Karolina Andersson (FIN), Bogna Podkowińska (POL), Indrė Balnionytė-Gecevičienė (LTU)

9 November 2023	Great Britain	62–64	Sweden	Manchester
19:30	Scoring by quarter: 18–18, 13–17, 17–15, 14–14
	Pts: Winterburn 18; Rebs: Fagbenle 10; Asts: Winterburn 7	Boxscore	Pts: Lundquist 18; Rebs: Lundquist 10; Asts: Nyström 6	Arena: National Basketball Performance Centre; Attendance: 800; Referees: Jelena Tomić (CRO), Geert Jacobs (BEL), Tijmen Last (NED)

12 November 2023	Sweden	76–69	Denmark	Norrköping
14:00	Scoring by quarter: 21–20, 16–18, 23–15, 16–16
	Pts: Lundquist 28; Rebs: four players 5 Asts: Eldebrink 6	Boxscore	Pts: Jespersen 23; Rebs: Hesseldal 11; Asts: Tryggedsson 4	Arena: Stadium Arena; Attendance: 1,400; Referees: Cecília Tóth (HUN), Juozas Barkauskas (LTU), Ewa Matuszewska (POL)

12 November 2023	Estonia	45–83	Great Britain	Tallinn
16:00	Scoring by quarter: 12–17, 11–23, 13–16, 9–27
	Pts: Koorits 9 Rebs: Bratka 9 Asts: Kangur 3	Boxscore	Pts: Fagbenle 32; Rebs: Fagbenle 9 Asts: Leonard 7	Arena: Nord Cramo Spordihoone; Attendance: 950; Referees: Franko Gracin (CRO), Ivana Ivanović (SRB), Kristīne Simanoviča (LAT)

7 November 2024	Estonia	52–82	Sweden	Tallinn
19:00	Scoring by quarter: 17–22, 13–14, 7–26, 15–20
	Pts: Lass 17; Rebs: Pokk 7 Asts: Kangur, Lass 3	Boxscore	Pts: Lundquist 30; Rebs: Lundquist 12; Asts: Eldebrink 6	Arena: Nord Spordihoone; Attendance: 900; Referees: Veronika Obertová (SVK), Einārs Tukišs (LAT), Lynn Weiwers (LUX)

7 November 2024	Great Britain	75–62	Denmark	Manchester
19:30	Scoring by quarter: 19–15, 12–12, 25–19, 19–16
	Pts: Wilkinson 14; Rebs: Wilkinson 10; Asts: Winterburn 11	Boxscore	Pts: Jespersen 19; Rebs: Jespersen, ryggedsson 8 Asts: Jespersen 4	Arena: National Basketball Performance Centre; Attendance: 550; Referees: Amal Dahra (FRA), Andrea Bongiorni (ITA), Alexandre Maret (FRA)

10 November 2024	Sweden	63–60	Great Britain	Malmö
14:00	Scoring by quarter: 11–12, 12–16, 20–17, 20–15
	Pts: Eldebrink 19; Rebs: Lundquist 11; Asts: Eldebrink, Lundquist 4	Boxscore	Pts: Winterburn 22; Rebs: Fagbenle 10; Asts: Winterburn 5	Arena: Baltiska Hallen; Attendance: 2,118; Referees: Ariadna Chueca (ESP), Dennis Sirowi (GER), Kristīne Simanoviča (LAT)

10 November 2024	Estonia	66–58	Denmark	Tallinn
16:00	Scoring by quarter: 18–22, 8–4, 22–17, 18–15
	Pts: Kosareva 15; Rebs: Bratka, Pokk 6 Asts: Kangur 5	Boxscore	Pts: Jespersen 17; Rebs: Jespersen 15; Asts: Jespersen 4	Arena: Nord Spordihoone; Attendance: 968; Referees: Alakbar Hasanov (AZE), Milita Stalaučinskaitė (LTU), Anna Belousova (LAT)

6 February 2025	Denmark	72–98	Sweden	Gentofte
19:00	Scoring by quarter: 21–26, 15–22, 17–23, 19–27
	Pts: Okosun 23; Rebs: Okosun 12; Asts: Jespersen 7	Boxscore	Pts: Lundquist 18; Rebs: Lundquist 15; Asts: Lundquist 7	Arena: Gentofte Sportspark; Attendance: 650; Referees: Karolina Andersson (FIN), Alexandra-Ioana Stan (ROU), Nikola Bejat (NOR)

6 February 2025	Great Britain	93–42	Estonia	Manchester
19:30	Scoring by quarter: 23-10, 23-14, 23-12, 24-6
	Pts: Ashby 12; Rebs: Wilkinson 10; Asts: Winterburn 9	Boxscore	Pts: Adams 10; Rebs: Lass 7 Asts: Adams, Lass 3	Arena: National Basketball Performance Centre; Attendance: 550; Referees: Viola Györgyi (ROU), Veronika Vávrová (CZE), Zdenko Tomašovič (SVK)

9 February 2025	Denmark	58–75	Great Britain	Gentofte
14:00	Scoring by quarter: 7-22, 17-22, 21-25, 13-6
	Pts: Mortensen, Okosun 15; Rebs: Okosun 13; Asts: Sandback 4	Boxscore	Pts: Jump 20; Rebs: Wilkinson 9 Asts: Winterburn 10	Arena: Gentofte Sportspark; Referees: Davíð Tómasson (ISL), Anna Belousova (LAT), Karol Kowalski (FIN)

9 February 2025	Sweden	70–51	Estonia	Luleå
14:00	Scoring by quarter: 21-8, 11-22, 16-8, 22-13
	Pts: Fontaine 19; Rebs: Wadling 7 Asts: Nyström 5	Boxscore	Pts: Bratka 16; Rebs: Bratka 10; Asts: Kangur 3	Arena: Luleå Energi Arena; Referees: Valentin Oliot (FRA), Joona Haaja (FIN), Tomasz Łangowski (POL)

=== Group E ===
Pos	Team	Pld	W	L	PF	PA	PD	Pts	Qualification
1	France	6	6	0	572	263	+309	12	Final tournament
2	Latvia	6	4	2	450	459	−9	10	
3	Israel	6	2	4	431	481	−50	8	
4	Ireland	6	0	6	333	583	−250	6	

Source: FIBA
Rules for classification: 1) Points; 2) Head-to-head; 3) Points difference; 4) Points scored.

9 November 2023	France	71–49	Latvia	Poitiers
20:45	Scoring by quarter: 23–11, 17–13, 20–8, 11–17
	Pts: Salaün 15; Rebs: Michel 7 Asts: Bernies 5	Boxscore	Pts: Pulvere 8 Rebs: Sila, Strautmane 4 Asts: Jākobsone 4	Arena: Arena Futuroscope; Attendance: 4,000; Referees: Valerio Grigioni (ITA), Veronika Vávrová (CZE), José Pedroso (POR)

12 November 2023	Ireland	48–100	France	Dublin
17:00	Scoring by quarter: 17–18, 6–31, 12–31, 13–20
	Pts: Melia 16; Rebs: Herlihy 7 Asts: Melia 3	Boxscore	Pts: Touré 20; Rebs: Touré 7 Asts: Fauthoux 7	Arena: National Basketball Arena; Attendance: 1,000; Referees: Andrada Csender (ROU), Yasmina Alcaraz (ESP), Lynn Weiwers (LUX)

8 February 2024 (Note: Due to the Gaza war, the matches of Israel were rescheduled from October 2023 to February 2024.)	Israel	87–57	Ireland	Riga, Latvia (Note: Due to the Israel–Hamas war, the match was played at a neutral venue.)
19:00	Scoring by quarter: 26–16, 25–16, 18–8, 18–17
	Pts: Zipel 17; Rebs: Simms 9 Asts: Simms 6	Boxscore	Pts: Hickey 22; Rebs: Hickey 13; Asts: Hickey 4	Arena: Arena Riga; Attendance: 10; Referees: Orhan Hekimoğlu (TUR), Eirini Tsantali (GRE), Elvis Binders-Čoders (LAT)

11 February 2024	Latvia	86–83(OT)	Israel	Riga
17:00	Scoring by quarter: 16–19, 19–25, 23–14, 17–17, Overtime: 11–8
	Pts: Šteinberga 22; Rebs: Šteinberga 16; Asts: Jākobsone 7	Boxscore	Pts: Simms 25; Rebs: Simms 9 Asts: Baron 4	Arena: Olympic Sports Centre; Attendance: 937; Referees: Jelena Smiljanić (SRB), Juozas Barkauskas (LTU), Bogna Podkowińska (POL)

7 November 2024	France	94–52	Israel	Caen
21:10	Scoring by quarter: 23–14, 24–10, 24–8, 23–20
	Pts: Williams 14; Rebs: Salaün 8 Asts: Bernies 5	Boxscore	Pts: Rotberg 14; Rebs: Raber 6 Asts: Eisner 5	Arena: Palais des sports de Caen; Attendance: 4,000; Referees: Ivana Ivanović (SRB), Sandra Sánchez (ESP), Martina Mekelová (SVK)

7 November 2024	Latvia	85–53	Ireland	Riga
19:40	Scoring by quarter: 23–18, 28–13, 21–14, 13–8
	Pts: Laksa 25; Rebs: Šteinberga 11; Asts: Šteinberga, Vihmane 5	Boxscore	Pts: Finn, Hickey 13; Rebs: O'Connor 7 Asts: Herlihy 4	Arena: Olympic Sports Centre; Attendance: 900; Referees: Ewa Matuszewska (POL), Milita Stalaučinskaitė (LTU), Eirini Tsantili (GRE)

10 November 2024	Ireland	61–90	Israel	Riga, Latvia
14:15	Scoring by quarter: 13–20, 18–26, 21–17, 9–27
	Pts: Herlihy 27; Rebs: Hickey, Rafferty 10; Asts: Herlihy 5	Boxscore	Pts: Simms 21; Rebs: Simms 10; Asts: Simms 10	Arena: Olympic Sports Centre; Attendance: 25; Referees: Alexandra-Ioana Stan (ROU), Tom De Lange (BEL), Marija Ćirić (SRB)

10 November 2024	Latvia	51–82	France	Riga
18:10	Scoring by quarter: 12–20, 12–18, 10–23, 17–21
	Pts: Šteinberga 19; Rebs: Sila 8 Asts: Vihmane 4	Boxscore	Pts: Williams 18; Rebs: Vukosavljević 8 Asts: Williams 4	Arena: Olympic Sports Centre; Attendance: 910; Referees: Özlem Yalman (TUR), Jelena Tomić (CRO), Sara Månsson (SWE)

6 February 2025	France	125–24	Ireland	Chalon-sur-Saône
19:15	Scoring by quarter: 35–7, 29–9, 34–2, 27–6
	Pts: Salaün 19; Rebs: Malonga 9 Asts: Astier, Fauthoux 8	Boxscore	Pts: Melia 9 Rebs: Hickey 4 Asts: three players 1	Arena: Le Colisée; Attendance: 3,250; Referees: Tijmen Last (NED), Martina Mekelová (SVK), Bogna Podkowińska (POL)

6 February 2025	Israel	80–83	Latvia	Riga, Latvia
19:30	Scoring by quarter: 17–15, 25–34, 9–20, 29–14
	Pts: Raber 20; Rebs: Raber 20; Asts: Eisner 6	Boxscore	Pts: Laksa 31; Rebs: Šteinberga 13; Asts: Krēsliņa 3	Arena: Olympic Sports Centre; Referees: Yasmina Alcaraz (ESP), Josip Jurčević (CRO), Blaž Zupančič (SLO)

9 February 2025	Israel	39–100	France	Riga, Latvia
16:00	Scoring by quarter: 16–29, 9–21, 3–26, 11–24
	Pts: Baron 8 Rebs: Raber 4 Asts: Simms, Zipel 2	Boxscore	Pts: Rupert 17; Rebs: Rupert 6 Asts: Fauthoux 8	Arena: Olympic Sports Centre; Referees: Mihkel Männiste (EST), Ewa Matuszewska (POL), Nataša Dragojević (MNE)

9 February 2025	Ireland	90–96	Latvia	Dublin
17:00	Scoring by quarter: 18–24, 28–27, 22–19, 22–26
	Pts: Melia 26; Rebs: Melia 12; Asts: Melia 5	Boxscore	Pts: Šteinberga 33; Rebs: Šteinberga 17; Asts: Vihmane 7	Arena: National Basketball Arena; Referees: Esperanza Mendoza (ESP), Chess Van Looy (BEL), Armin Mutapcic (GER)

=== Group F ===
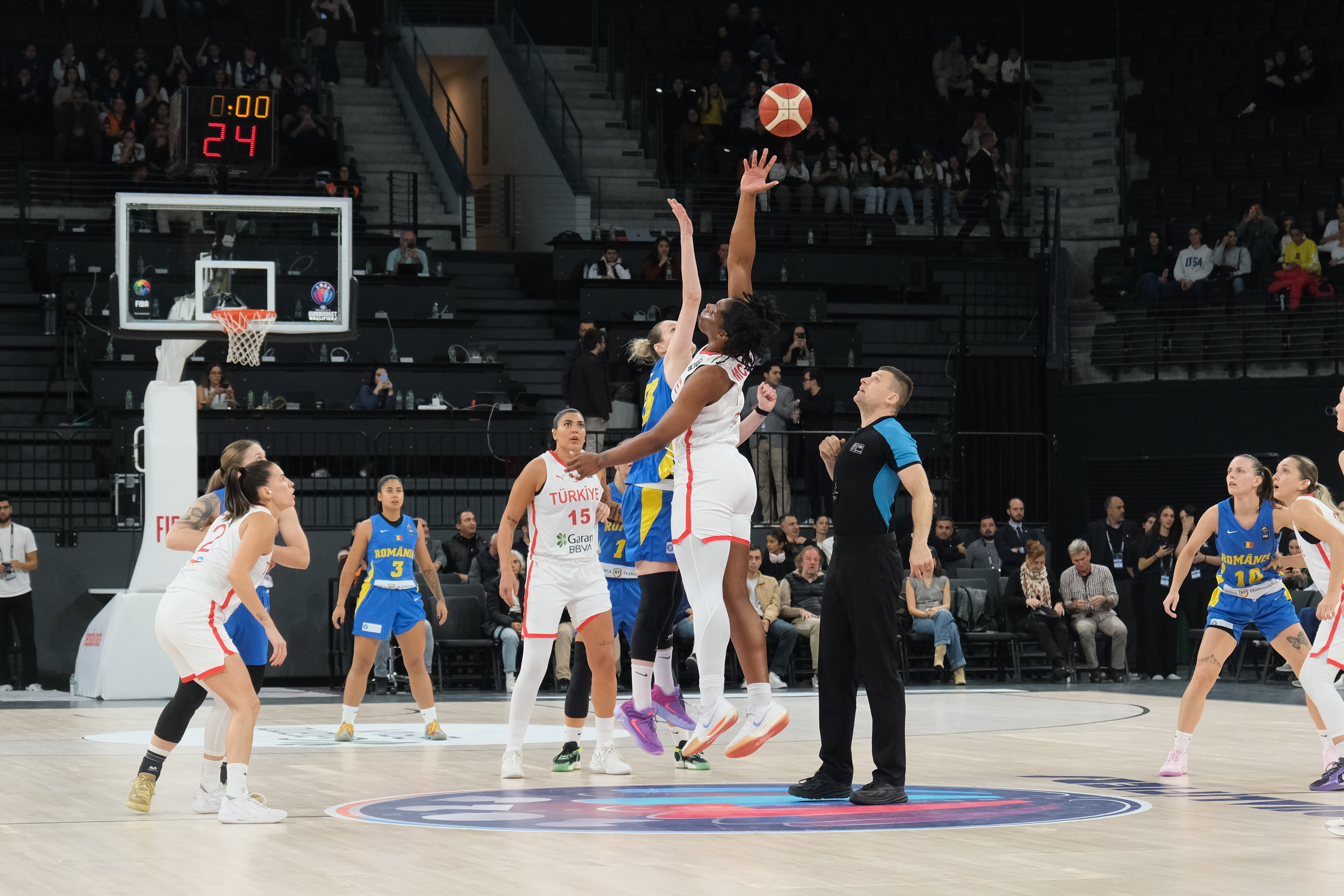
Turkey against Romania in Basketball Development Center, Istanbul (November 2024)

Pos	Team	Pld	W	L	PF	PA	PD	Pts	Qualification
1	Turkey	6	6	0	495	346	+149	12	Final tournament
2	Slovakia	6	4	2	429	394	+35	10	
3	Romania	6	1	5	399	530	−131	7 (Note: Romania 3 Pts, +8 PD; Iceland 3 Pts, −8 PD.)	
4	Iceland	6	1	5	413	466	−53	7	

Source: FIBA
Rules for classification: 1) Points; 2) Head-to-head; 3) Points difference; 4) Points scored.
Notes:

9 November 2023	Romania	82–70	Iceland	Constanța
18:00	Scoring by quarter: 29–19, 16–19, 20–16, 17–16
	Pts: Podar 14; Rebs: Virjoghe 9 Asts: Podar 9	Boxscore	Pts: Benónýsdóttir 23; Rebs: Boama, Jónsdóttir 4 Asts: Jónsdóttir 9	Arena: Sala Sporturilor; Attendance: 900; Referees: Jelena Smiljanić (SRB), Kyriacos Christou (CYP), Marija Ćirić (SRB)

9 November 2023	Turkey	75–40	Slovakia	İzmit
18:30	Scoring by quarter: 19–8, 24–12, 10–6, 22–14
	Pts: Şenyürek 14; Rebs: Hollingsworth 8 Asts: Bayram 5	Boxscore	Pts: Páleníková 12; Rebs: three players 4 Asts: Wrzesiński 5	Arena: Şehit Polis Recep Topaloğlu Sports Hall; Attendance: 5,100; Referees: Amel Dahra (FRA), Ivana Radinović (MNE), Ventsislav Velikov (BUL)

12 November 2023	Romania	77–93	Slovakia	Constanța
18:00	Scoring by quarter: 23–25, 21–24, 12–23, 21–21
	Pts: Irimia 21; Rebs: Vîrjoghe 12; Asts: Podar 5	Boxscore	Pts: Páleníková 27; Rebs: Sedláková 7 Asts: Wrzesiński 9	Arena: Sala Sporturilor; Attendance: 1,100; Referees: Suzana Vujičić (MNE), Maria Ignatiou (CYP), Balázs Mészáros (HUN)

12 November 2023	Iceland	65–72	Turkey	Hafnarfjörður
18:30	Scoring by quarter: 17–20, 9–19, 24–18, 15–15
	Pts: Ágústsdóttir 20; Rebs: Sigurðardóttir 6 Asts: Sævarsdóttir 4	Boxscore	Pts: Hollingsworth 17; Rebs: Bayram 9 Asts: Onar 4	Arena: Ásvellir; Attendance: 800; Referees: Nikola Bejat (NOR), Patrick Müller (GER), Sara Månsson (SWE)

7 November 2024	Turkey	101–54	Romania	Istanbul
19:00	Scoring by quarter: 25–16, 33–15, 20–10, 23–13
	Pts: McCowan 12; Rebs: Ataş 8 Asts: Uzun 9	Boxscore	Pts: Armanu 9 Rebs: Ghita 6 Asts: Podar 3	Arena: Basketball Development Center; Attendance: 1,900; Referees: Łukasz Jankowski (POL), Azra Mušić (SLO), Stefan Vuković (MNE)

7 November 2024	Iceland	70–78	Slovakia	Hafnarfjörður
19:30	Scoring by quarter: 24–16, 11–24, 18–15, 17–23
	Pts: Rodriguez 29; Rebs: Rodriguez, Jónsdóttir 5 Asts: Jónsdóttir, Ágústsdóttir 4	Boxscore	Pts: Jakubcová 15; Rebs: Mištinová 10; Asts: Buknová 5	Arena: Olafssalur; Attendance: 900; Referees: Karolina Andersson (FIN), Filip Szczesny (NOR), Cynthia Le Quilliec (FRA)

10 November 2024	Iceland	77–73	Romania	Hafnarfjörður
17:00	Scoring by quarter: 22–25, 22–12, 11–14, 22–22
	Pts: Rodriguez 25; Rebs: Sigurðardóttir 13; Asts: Rodriguez 9	Boxscore	Pts: Ghita 18; Rebs: Ghita 10; Asts: Manea, Popescu 3	Arena: Olafssalur; Attendance: 872; Referees: Sandra Sánchez (ESP), Martin Van Hoye (BEL), Alexander Reiertsen (NOR)

10 November 2024	Slovakia	50–65	Turkey	Bratislava
18:00	Scoring by quarter: 9–19, 9–13, 13–14, 22–19
	Pts: Mištinová 11; Rebs: Buknová, Moravčíková 5 Asts: Remenárová 4	Boxscore	Pts: McCowan 24; Rebs: McCowan 13; Asts: Uzun 5	Arena: Gopass Arena; Attendance: 2,084; Referees: Ivana Ivanović (SRB), Hrvoje Cavar (BIH), Milosav Kaluđerović (MNE)

6 February 2025	Turkey	83–76	Iceland	İzmit
19:00	Scoring by quarter: 22–15, 16–18, 26–23, 19–20
	Pts: Cora 17; Rebs: Yıldızhan 11; Asts: Uzun 9	Boxscore	Pts: Hinriksdóttir 29; Rebs: Hinriksdóttir 7 Asts: Rodriguez 5	Arena: Şehit Polis Recep Topaloğlu Sports Hall; Attendance: 4,000; Referees: Sinisa Prpa (SRB), Diana Lapanović (SLO), Eirini Tsantali (GRE)

6 February 2025	Slovakia	90–52	Romania	Bratislava
19:00	Scoring by quarter: 24–4, 16–21, 30–7, 20–20
	Pts: Páleníková 24; Rebs: Remenárová 12; Asts: Páleníková 4	Boxscore	Pts: Virjoghe 10; Rebs: Virjoghe 10; Asts: Panait 3	Arena: Gopass Arena; Attendance: 1,050; Referees: Ariadna Chueca (ESP), Suzana Vujičić (MNE), Łukasz Jankowski (POL)

9 February 2025	Romania	61–99	Turkey	Ploiești
18:00	Scoring by quarter: 12–23, 17–21, 14–30, 18–25
	Pts: Panait 11; Rebs: Ghita 5 Asts: Panait 4	Boxscore	Pts: Şenyürek 15; Rebs: Bayram 6 Asts: Uzun 5	Arena: Olimpia Sports Hall; Referees: Silvia Marziali (ITA), Ivana Ivanović (SRB), Mikheil Vartanov (GEO)

9 February 2025	Slovakia	78–55	Iceland	Bratislava
18:00	Scoring by quarter: 10–23, 25–9, 17–8, 26–15
	Pts: Dudášová 21; Rebs: Dudášová, Remenárová 10; Asts: Dudášová 5	Boxscore	Pts: Hinriksdóttir 20; Rebs: Rodriguez 9 Asts: Rodriguez 4	Arena: Gopass Arena; Referees: Jelena Tomić (CRO), Karolina Andersson (FIN), Aleksandar Radonjić (BIH)

=== Group G ===
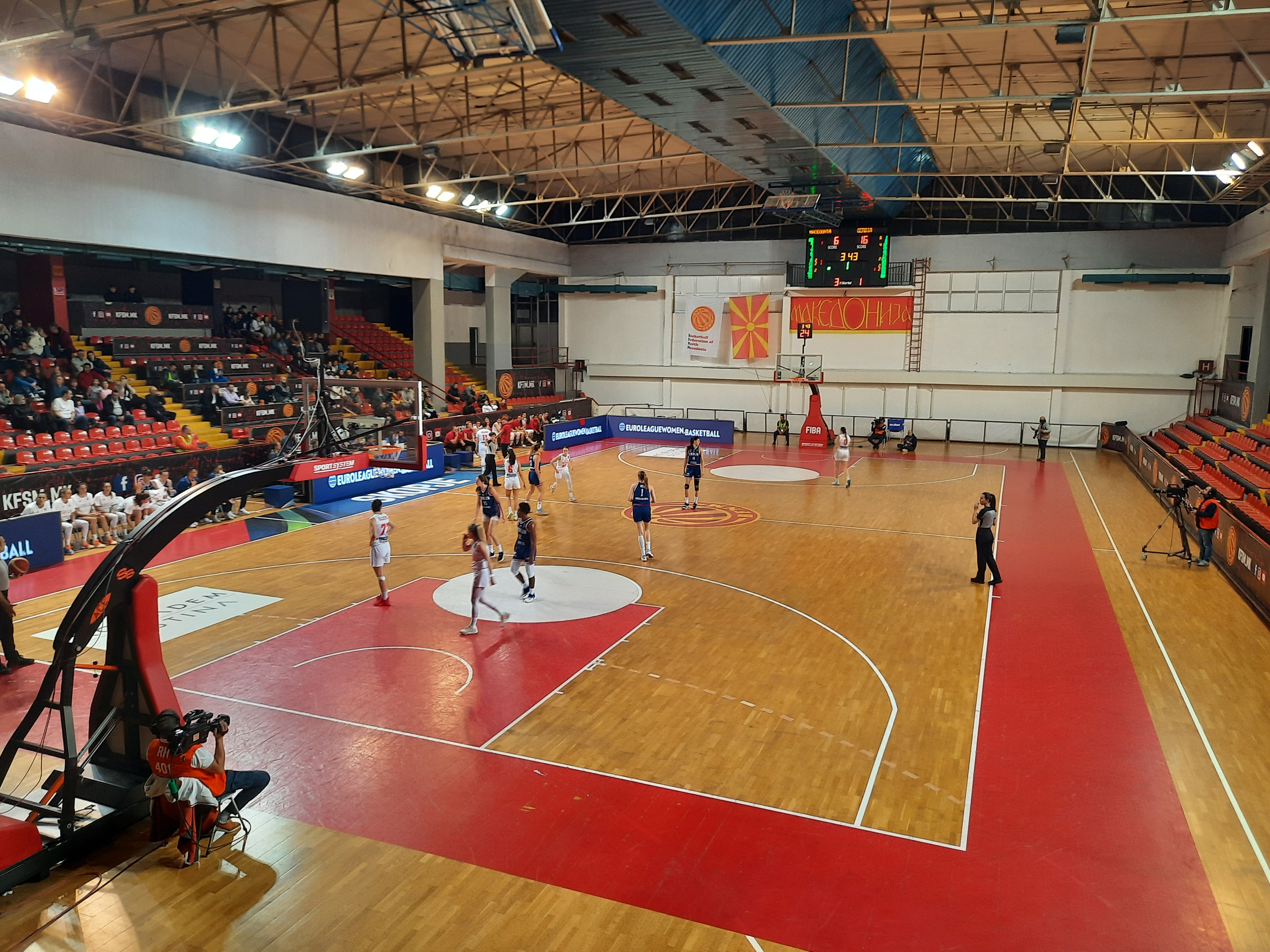
North Macedonia against Serbia in Kale Sports Hall, Skopje (November 2023)

Pos	Team	Pld	W	L	PF	PA	PD	Pts	Qualification
1	Serbia	6	5	1	480	307	+173	11 (Note: Serbia 3 Pts, +17 PD; Portugal 3 Pts, −17 PD.)	Final tournament
2	Portugal	6	5	1	373	326	+47	11	Final tournament
3	Ukraine	6	2	4	385	420	−35	8	
4	North Macedonia	6	0	6	336	521	−185	6	

Updated to match(es) played on 6 February 2025. Source: FIBA
Rules for classification: 1) Points; 2) Head-to-head; 3) Points difference; 4) Points scored.
Notes:

9 November 2023	Serbia	82–40	Ukraine	Belgrade
18:00	Scoring by quarter: 26–8, 23–10, 17–8, 16–14
	Pts: Krajišnik 22; Rebs: Krajišnik 13; Asts: three players 4	Boxscore	Pts: Balaban 10; Rebs: Yurkevichus 7 Asts: Uro-Nilie 3	Arena: Ranko Žeravica Sports Hall; Attendance: 2,000; Referees: Alexandra-Ioana Stan (ROU), Alin Faur (ROU), Emmouil Tsolakos (GRE)

9 November 2023	Portugal	65–52	North Macedonia	Matosinhos
20:30	Scoring by quarter: 14–10, 20–17, 13–18, 18–7
	Pts: Bettencourt 15; Rebs: Kostourkova, S. Silva 11; Asts: Soeiro 9	Boxscore	Pts: Mitrašinoviḱ 17; Rebs: Hempe 7 Asts: Mitrašinoviḱ 5	Arena: Centro de Desportos e Congressos de Matosinhos; Attendance: 1,850; Referees: Yasmina Alcaraz (ESP), James Dominique (GIB), Sandra Sánchez (ESP)

12 November 2023	North Macedonia	60–103	Serbia	Skopje
18:00	Scoring by quarter: 12–30, 16–21, 18–28, 14–24
	Pts: Mitrašinoviḱ 23; Rebs: Hempe 8 Asts: Mitrašinoviḱ 6	Boxscore	Pts: Dugalić 17; Rebs: Krajišnik 8 Asts: Anderson 6	Arena: SRC Kale; Attendance: 500; Referees: Özlem Yalman (TUR), Nikolaos Tziopanos (GRE), Sinem Tetik (TUR)

12 November 2023	Ukraine	63–78	Portugal	Riga, Latvia (Note: Due to the Russian invasion of Ukraine, the Ukrainian team plays their home matches at neutral venues.)
18:00	Scoring by quarter: 20–17, 10–12, 19–14, 14–35
	Pts: Balaban 19; Rebs: Yurkevichus 15; Asts: Yurkevichus 7	Boxscore	Pts: Ferreira 20; Rebs: Kostourkova 9 Asts: Soeiro 8	Arena: Olympic Sports Centre; Attendance: 200; Referees: Ritvars Helmšteins (LAT), Çisil Güngör (TUR), Elvis Binders-Čoders (LAT)

7 November 2024	Serbia	71–37	Portugal	Belgrade
18:00	Scoring by quarter: 18–12, 15–4, 14–12, 24–9
	Pts: Anderson 16; Rebs: Anderson, Dugalić 8 Asts: Anderson 8	Boxscore	Pts: Da Silva 12; Rebs: Kostourkova 10; Asts: Da Costa, Rodrigues 3	Arena: Ranko Žeravica Sports Hall; Attendance: 1,200; Referees: Viola Györgyi (ROU), Maria Ignatiou (CYP), Alin Faur (ROU)

7 November 2024	North Macedonia	49–98	Ukraine	Skopje
18:00	Scoring by quarter: 13–26, 13–26, 7–27, 16–19
	Pts: Mitrashinovikj 17; Rebs: Mitrashinovikj 7 Asts: Mitrashinovikj 5	Boxscore	Pts: Balaban 19; Rebs: Yurkevichus 9 Asts: Dubniuk 10	Arena: SRC Kale; Attendance: 200; Referees: Alexandra-Ioana Stan (ROU), Veronika Vávrová (CZE), Xhelal Mumini (KOS)

10 November 2024	North Macedonia	43–76	Portugal	Skopje
18:00	Scoring by quarter: 12–22, 10–19, 8–19, 13–15
	Pts: Mitrashinovikj 16; Rebs: Hempe, Mitrashinovikj 6 Asts: Mitrashinovikj 3	Boxscore	Pts: Bettencourt 16; Rebs: Kostourkova 11; Asts: Rodrigues, Soeiro 5	Arena: SRC Kale; Attendance: 150; Referees: Stylianos Simeonidis (GRE), Suzana Vujičić (MNE), Vladimir Zanev (BUL)

10 November 2024	Ukraine	53–79	Serbia	Riga, Latvia
21:30	Scoring by quarter: 18–27, 14–23, 19–11, 2–18
	Pts: Uro-Nilie 14; Rebs: Yurkevichus 11; Asts: Dubniuk 6	Boxscore	Pts: Anderson 19; Rebs: Raca 6 Asts: Anderson 4	Arena: Olympic Sports Centre; Attendance: 200; Referees: Juozas Barkauskas (LTU), Karolina Andersson (FIN), Jānis Rozenbergs (LAT)

6 February 2025	Serbia	105–60	North Macedonia	Belgrade
18:00	Scoring by quarter: 27–11, 24–14, 23–18, 31–11
	Pts: Anderson, Nogić 21; Rebs: Topuzović 8 Asts: Anderson 10	Boxscore	Pts: Mitrashinovikj 17; Rebs: Hempe 6 Asts: Nikolikj 4	Arena: Aleksandar Nikolić Hall; Attendance: 2,500; Referees: Joaquin García (ESP), Vlad-Theodor Cotrobas-Dascalu (ROU), Monika Mincheva (BUL)

6 February 2025	Portugal	60–57	Ukraine	Coimbra
19:00	Scoring by quarter: 16–17, 13–12, 13–11, 18–17
	Pts: Da Costa, Rodrigues 14; Rebs: Kostourkova 9 Asts: Bettencourt 3	Boxscore	Pts: Filevych 21; Rebs: Filevych, Yurkevichus 8 Asts: Iagupova 8	Arena: Pavilhão Multidesportos Dr. Mário Mexia; Attendance: 1,200; Referees: Çisil Güngör (TUR), Alberto Sánchez (ESP), Ioannis Tiganis (GRE)

9 February 2025	Portugal	57–40	Serbia	Coimbra
17:00	Scoring by quarter: 12–14, 16–13, 14–11, 15–2
	Pts: Da Costa 15; Rebs: Kostourkova 8 Asts: Bettencourt 4	Boxscore	Pts: Anderson 9 Rebs: Topuzović 7 Asts: Đorđević, Nogić 2	Arena: Pavilhão Multidesportos Dr. Mário Mexia; Referees: Cecília Tóth (HUN), Arnau Padros (ESP), Paulina Gajdosz (POL)

9 February 2025	Ukraine	74–72	North Macedonia	Riga, Latvia
20:00	Scoring by quarter: 22–12, 15–18, 21–18, 16–24
	Pts: Iagupova 19; Rebs: Yurkevichus 13; Asts: Iagupova 10	Boxscore	Pts: Mitrashinovikj 33; Rebs: Mitrashinovikj 7 Asts: Mitrashinovikj 7	Arena: Olympic Sports Centre; Referees: Emma Perry (IRL), Einārs Tukišs (LAT), Andžej Urbanovič (LTU)

=== Group H ===
Pos	Team	Pld	W	L	PF	PA	PD	Pts	Qualification
1	Montenegro	6	4	2	443	362	+81	10 (Note: Montenegro 6 Pts, +27 PD; Switzerland 6 Pts, −9 PD; Luxembourg 6 Pts, −18 PD)	Final tournament
2	Switzerland	6	4	2	391	333	+58	10	Final tournament
3	Luxembourg	6	4	2	379	343	+36	10	
4	Bosnia and Herzegovina	6	0	6	324	499	−175	6	

Source: FIBA
Rules for classification: 1) Points; 2) Head-to-head; 3) Points difference; 4) Points scored.
Notes:

9 November 2023	Switzerland	48–56	Luxembourg	Fribourg
19:30	Scoring by quarter: 17–16, 14–10, 7–11, 10–19
	Pts: Herminjard, Schwarz 12; Rebs: Heide 12; Asts: Fora, Herminjard 4	Boxscore	Pts: Skrijelj 16; Rebs: Etute 12; Asts: Etute 4	Arena: Ssite Sportif Saint-Leonard; Attendance: 650; Referees: Veronika Obertová (SVK), Maria Ignatiou (CYP), Joana Pessoa (POR)

9 November 2023	Bosnia and Herzegovina	70–91	Montenegro	Sarajevo
20:00	Scoring by quarter: 12–18, 18–24, 22–24, 18–25
	Pts: Brčaninović 24; Rebs: Deura 7 Asts: Deura 4	Boxscore	Pts: Davis-Reimer 19; Rebs: Živković 6 Asts: Živković 7	Arena: Sports Hall Hills; Attendance: 500; Referees: Ariadna Chueca (ESP), Çisil Güngör (TUR), Viktor Nagy (HUN)

12 November 2023	Luxembourg	77–64	Bosnia and Herzegovina	Luxembourg City
17:00	Scoring by quarter: 24–12, 23–22, 12–13, 18–17
	Pts: Etute 25; Rebs: Etute 14; Asts: three players 2	Boxscore	Pts: Brčaninović 13; Rebs: Brčaninović 7 Asts: Domuzin 4	Arena: d'Coque; Attendance: 800; Referees: Sonia Teixeira (POR), Marion Ortis (FRA), Eirini Tsantali (GRE)

12 November 2023	Montenegro	85–61	Switzerland	Herceg Novi
18:00	Scoring by quarter: 13–12, 28–12, 25–22, 19–15
	Pts: Radonjić 13; Rebs: three players 5 Asts: Vučetić 5	Boxscore	Pts: Herminjard 17; Rebs: Schwarz 10; Asts: Herminjard 6	Arena: Sportski Centar Igalo; Attendance: 1,500; Referees: Gilbert Hoxha (ALB), Martina Mekelová (SVK), Anastasia Tsakiraki (GRE)

7 November 2024	Bosnia and Herzegovina	62–81	Switzerland	Sarajevo
18:00	Scoring by quarter: 13–19, 15–30, 17–20, 17–12
	Pts: Domuzin 21; Rebs: Brčaninović 10; Asts: Brčaninović 5	Boxscore	Pts: Herminjard 19; Rebs: Heide 10; Asts: Fora 7	Arena: Mirza Delibašić Hall; Attendance: 250; Referees: Özlem Yalman (TUR), Sarty Nghixulifwa (RWA), Balázs Mészáros (HUN)

7 November 2024	Luxembourg	71–49	Montenegro	Luxembourg City
19:00	Scoring by quarter: 18–17, 28–11, 13–7, 12–14
	Pts: Cahill 32; Rebs: Ehi Etute 12; Asts: Simon 7	Boxscore	Pts: Živković 16; Rebs: Kovačević 9 Asts: Leković, Živaljević 3	Arena: d'Coque; Attendance: 650; Referees: Yasmina Alcaraz (ESP), Diogo Martins (POR), Nermin Hodžić (GER)

10 November 2024	Luxembourg	44–59	Switzerland	Luxembourg City
17:00	Scoring by quarter: 10–18, 11–13, 17–7, 6–21
	Pts: Cahill 15; Rebs: Ehi Etute 14; Asts: Cahill, Simon 4	Boxscore	Pts: Favre 12; Rebs: Schwarz 14; Asts: Heide, Herminjard 4	Arena: d'Coque; Attendance: 1,300; Referees: Silvia Marziali (ITA), Diana Lapanović (SLO), Pierre Landy (FRA)

10 November 2024	Montenegro	85–52	Bosnia and Herzegovina	Bar
18:00	Scoring by quarter: 17–10, 18–11, 23–16, 27–15
	Pts: Živaljević 13; Rebs: Kovačević 10; Asts: Leković, Živković 6	Boxscore	Pts: Brčaninović 17; Rebs: Brčaninović 11; Asts: Domuzin, Došić 2	Arena: Topolica Sport Hall; Attendance: 500; Referees: Viola Györgyi (ROU), Vicente Martínez (ESP), Gilbert Hoxha (ALB)

6 February 2025	Bosnia and Herzegovina	37–78	Luxembourg	Sarajevo
18:00	Scoring by quarter: 8–21, 11–14, 7–21, 11–22
	Pts: Domuzin 12; Rebs: Šipka 8 Asts: Bekić 2	Boxscore	Pts: Simon 25; Rebs: Etute 10; Asts: Cahill 6	Arena: Sports Hall Hills; Attendance: 150; Referees: Paulina Gajdosz (POL), Ioannis Agrafiotis (GRE), Viktor Nagy (HUN)

6 February 2025	Switzerland	55–47	Montenegro	Aarau
19:30	Scoring by quarter: 10–14, 15–15, 7–9, 23–9
	Pts: Herminjard 18; Rebs: Fora, Martinez 10; Asts: three players 1	Boxscore	Pts: Kovačević, Mack 12; Rebs: Mack 10; Asts: Živković 3	Arena: Sporthalle Schachen; Attendance: 800; Referees: Veronika Obertová (SVK), Amal Dahra (FRA), Andrea Bongiorni (ITA)

9 February 2025	Switzerland	87–39	Bosnia and Herzegovina	Aarau
16:00	Scoring by quarter: 23–8, 21–10, 21–11, 22–10
	Pts: Martinez 20; Rebs: Martinez, Schwarz 9 Asts: Herminjard 7	Boxscore	Pts: Guska 12; Rebs: Domuzin 7 Asts: Domuzin 5	Arena: Sporthalle Schachen; Referees: Orhan Hekimoğlu (TUR), Maria Ignatiou (CYP), Alexandra-Ioana Stan (ROU)

9 February 2025	Montenegro	86–53	Luxembourg	Bar
16:00	Scoring by quarter: 31–12, 6–14, 27–15, 22–12
	Pts: Mack 15; Rebs: Mack 7 Asts: Živković 7	Boxscore	Pts: Cahill 13; Rebs: Cahill 10; Asts: Cahill 8	Arena: Topolica Sport Hall; Referees: Ariadna Chueca (ESP), Mehmet Şahin (TUR), Tijmen Last (NED)

=== Ranking of second-placed teams ===
The four best second-placed teams from the groups qualify for the final tournament.

Pos	Grp	Team	Pld	W	L	PF	PA	PD	Pts	Qualification
1	G	Portugal	6	5	1	373	326	+47	11	Final tournament
2	D	Great Britain	6	4	2	448	334	+114	10	Final tournament
3	C	Lithuania	6	4	2	493	402	+91	10	Final tournament
4	H	Switzerland	6	4	2	391	333	+58	10	Final tournament
5	A	Croatia	6	4	2	456	407	+49	10	
6	F	Slovakia	6	4	2	429	394	+35	10	
7	E	Latvia	6	4	2	450	459	−9	10	
8	B	Hungary	6	3	3	441	406	+35	9	

Source: FIBA
Rules for classification: 1) Points; 2) Points difference; 3) Points scored.

=== Group I ===
The four hosts are placed into one group and the results did not count into the qualifying process.

Pos	Team	Pld	W	L	PF	PA	PD	Pts
1	Italy	6	4	2	407	357	+50	10 (Note: Italy 4 Pts; Germany 2 Pts.)
2	Germany	6	4	2	418	397	+21	10
3	Czech Republic	6	2	4	376	437	−61	8 (Note: Czech Republic 3 Pts +6 PD; Greece 3 Pts, −6 PD.)
4	Greece	6	2	4	404	414	−10	8

Source: FIBA
Rules for classification: 1) Points; 2) Head-to-head; 3) Points difference; 4) Points scored.
Notes:

9 November 2023	Czech Republic	41–85	Germany	Prague
18:00	Scoring by quarter: 9–19, 10–22, 8–21, 14–23
	Pts: Voráčková 10; Rebs: Čechová 8 Asts: Pospíšilová, Voráčková 4	Boxscore	Pts: S. Sabally 21; Rebs: N. Sabally 13; Asts: Brunckhorst 5	Arena: Královka Arena; Attendance: 1,350; Referees: Cecília Tóth (HUN), Sinem Tetik (TUR), Franko Gracin (CRO)

9 November 2023	Italy	76–67	Greece	Vigevano
20:00	Scoring by quarter: 24–10, 15–21, 14–17, 23–19
	Pts: Cubaj 18; Rebs: Zandalasini 9 Asts: Cubaj 6	Boxscore	Pts: Spanou 21; Rebs: Spanou 10; Asts: Pavlopoulou 10	Arena: Palasport Vigevano; Attendance: 1,500; Referees: Özlem Yalman (TUR), Laure Coanus (FRA), Blaž Zupančič (SLO)

12 November 2023	Greece	75–66	Czech Republic	Chalcis
17:00	Scoring by quarter: 18–11, 19–23, 24–18, 14–14
	Pts: Christinaki 20; Rebs: Christinaki 7 Asts: Pavlopoulou 11	Boxscore	Pts: three players 16; Rebs: Šotolová 9 Asts: Voráčková 9	Arena: Tasos Kampouris Kanithou Indoor Hall; Attendance: 1,400; Referees: Ariadna Chueca (ESP), Zoran Mitrovski (MKD), Josip Jurčević (CRO)

12 November 2023	Germany	53–70	Italy	Hamburg
17:30	Scoring by quarter: 8–21, 19–15, 12–12, 14–22
	Pts: N. Sabally 12; Rebs: N. Sabally 9 Asts: S. Sabally 4	Boxscore	Pts: Villa 17; Rebs: Cubaj 13; Asts: Villa 3	Arena: Edel-optics.de Arena; Attendance: 3,400; Referees: Viola Györgyi (ROU), Alexandra-Ioana Stan (ROU), Paulina Gajdosz (POL)

7 November 2024	Italy	68–47	Czech Republic	Genova
18:15	Scoring by quarter: 25–17, 8–9, 17–6, 18–15
	Pts: Andre 10; Rebs: Keys 8 Asts: Zandalasini 5	Boxscore	Pts: Čechová, Reisingerová 10; Rebs: Čechová, Voráčková 7 Asts: Voráčková 5	Arena: Palasport di Genova; Attendance: 2,000; Referees: Çisil Güngör (TUR), Jelena Tomić (CRO), Diana Lapanović (SLO)

7 November 2024	Germany	79–76	Greece	Hagen
19:30	Scoring by quarter: 19–19, 20–16, 19–18, 21–23
	Pts: Gülich 16; Rebs: Gülich 14; Asts: Peterson 5	Boxscore	Pts: Tsineke 23; Rebs: Spanou 12; Asts: Pavlopoulou 8	Arena: Ischelandhalle; Attendance: 2,847; Referees: Cecília Tóth (HUN), Ritvars Helmšteins (LAT), Rainis Värv (EST)

10 November 2024	Greece	56–45	Italy	Chalcis
14:45	Scoring by quarter: 23–20, 10–8, 9–7, 14–10
	Pts: Fasoula 24; Rebs: Fasoula, Spanou 13; Asts: Artemis Spanou	Boxscore	Pts: Villa 14; Rebs: three players 5 Asts: four players 2	Arena: Tasos Kampouris Kanithou Indoor Hall; Attendance: 1,200; Referees: Paulina Gajdosz (POL), Zoran Mitrovski (MKD), Nataša Dragojević (MNE)

10 November 2024	Germany	74–67	Czech Republic	Wetzlar
17:00	Scoring by quarter: 20–20, 17–17, 20–10, 17–20
	Pts: Wilke 17; Rebs: Gülich 10; Asts: Geiselsöder 5	Boxscore	Pts: Čechová 21; Rebs: Čechová 10; Asts: three players 3	Arena: Mittelhessen-Arena; Attendance: 1,649; Referees: Amal Dahra (FRA), Zdravko Rutešić (MNE), Emma Perry (IRL)

6 February 2025	Czech Republic	81–66	Greece	Brno
18:00	Scoring by quarter: 15–21, 19–16, 20–14, 27–15
	Pts: Hamzová, Reisingerová 14; Rebs: Reisingerová 13; Asts: Reisingerová 6	Boxscore	Pts: Spanou 25; Rebs: Christinaki 7 Asts: Pavlopoulou 12	Arena: Sportovní hala Vodova; Attendance: 1,050; Referees: Arnau Padros (ESP), Elvis Binders-Čoders (LAT), Sara Månsson (SWE)

6 February 2025	Italy	79–60	Germany	Faenza
20:30	Scoring by quarter: 23–21, 15–17, 22–6, 19–16
	Pts: Pan 21; Rebs: Andre, Verona 5 Asts: Verona, Zandalasini 6	Boxscore	Pts: N. Sabally 15; Rebs: Geiselsöder, N. Sabally 8 Asts: Peterson 6	Arena: PalaCattani; Attendance: 1,800; Referees: Kirile Tvauri (GEO), Domen Krajnc (SLO), Sandra Sánchez (ESP)

9 February 2025	Czech Republic	74–69	Italy	Brno
16:00	Scoring by quarter: 23–27, 18–12, 13–15, 20–15
	Pts: Holešínská 17; Rebs: Pospíšilová 6 Asts: Voráčková 7	Boxscore	Pts: Cubaj 16; Rebs: Cubaj 10; Asts: Villa 7	Arena: Sportovní hala Vodova; Referees: Josip Jurčević (CRO), Suzana Vujičić (MNE), Nemanja Vlahović (SRB)

9 February 2025	Greece	64–67	Germany	Glyfada
17:00	Scoring by quarter: 16–20, 10–17, 13–11, 25–19
	Pts: Fasoula 17; Rebs: Fasoula, Spanou 9 Asts: Tsineke 6	Boxscore	Pts: Geiselsöder 22; Rebs: Fiebich 9 Asts: Wilke 7	Arena: Municipal Athletic Center Makis Lioukas; Referees: Nikola Perlić (CRO), Veronika Obertová (SVK), Natalie Galuk (ISR)
