= Montenegro women's national basketball team =

Women's national basketball team representing Montenegro

Montenegro
- FIBA ranking: 26 ▼2 (18 March 2026)
- Joined FIBA: 2006
- FIBA zone: FIBA Europe
- National federation: Basketball Federation of Montenegro (KSCG)
- Coach: Jelena Škerović
- Nickname(s): Црна Гора / Crna Gora (The Black Mountain)

World Cup
- Appearances: 0
- Medals: None

EuroBasket
- Appearances: 8
- Medals: None

Games of the Small States of Europe
- Appearances: 5
- Medals: (gold) Gold: (2019, 2023, 2025)
First	Second

First international
- Montenegro 68–56 Ireland (Bijelo Polje, Montenegro; 27 August 2008)

Biggest win
- Montenegro 94–35 Azerbaijan (Topolica Sport Hall, Bar, Montenegro; 14 March 2026)

Biggest defeat
- Czech Republic 89–44Montenegro (Sportovní hala Vodova, Brno, Czechia; 19 June 2025)

The Montenegro women's national basketball team represents Montenegro in international women's basketball tournaments. The supervising body is the Basketball Federation of Montenegro.
The Montenegrin women's national team entered international competition in 2008, playing their first official match on 27 August, against the Republic of Ireland in Bijelo Polje (68–56).
The Montenegrin women's team participated at the EuroBasket Women nine times. The national team achieved its best result at EuroBasket 2011, finishing in sixth place.

== History ==
=== Period 2006–2015 ===
At 2006, soon after Montenegrin independence, Basketball Association of Montenegro became a member of FIBA. Federation founded its national teams, and among them was Montenegro women's basketball selection, which started to play in FIBA competitions during the 2008.
Montenegro started with the record of 17 consecutive wins in official games.
At summer 2008 and 2009, Montenegrin team played in FIBA Division B with the final score of 12 victories without any lose. That means fast promotion to FIBA Division A and participation in EuroBasket Women 2011 qualification.
In their first qualifiers, Montenegro qualified for EuroBasket Women 2011 as a first-placed team in the group. On EuroBasket, the team made successful result and played in quarterfinals. At the end, Montenegro finished as a sixth-placed team, which is the best placement in history of Montenegrin women's basketball.
After new successful qualifiers, Montenegro played on EuroBasket Women 2013, but finished competition in the second phase, with final placement on 10th position.
For the third time, Montenegro played on EuroBasket at 2015. Like 2011, Montenegro played in the quarterfinals but lost against Spain with one point difference. Montenegro finished EuroBasket 2015 as seventh-placed team.

=== Period 2016– ===
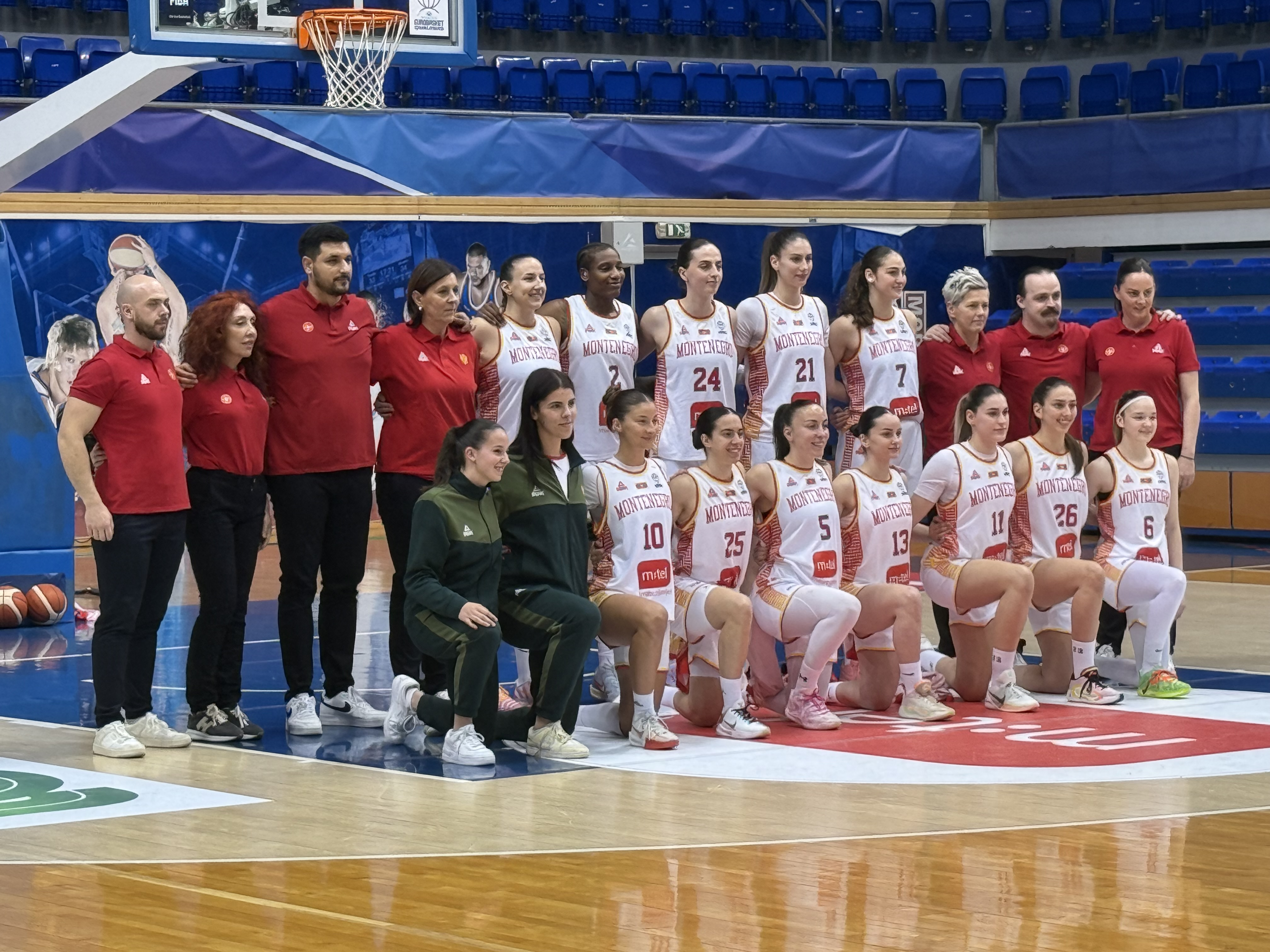
The Montenegro women's national basketball team 2026 before a game against Bulgaria

Montenegro made another successful result in qualifiers for EuroBasket Women 2017. With score 4–2, the team qualified for European Championship, fourth in their history. At the championship finals, Montenegrin team disappointed with 3 losses and elimination on early stage of tournament.

As in previous campaigns, the Montenegrin national team won the Group A in EuroBasket Women 2019 qualifiers and gained their fifth performance in the European Championship.

== Competitive record ==
Montenegro was part of Yugoslavia until 2006.

=== Olympic Games ===
Olympic Games
Year	Position	Pld	W	L
(China) 2008	Did not qualify			
(United Kingdom) 2012	Did not qualify			
(Brazil) 2016	Did not qualify			
(Japan) 2020	Did not qualify			
(France) 2024	Did not qualify			
(United States) 2028	To be determined			

=== FIBA Women's World Cup ===
Women's World Cup
Year	Position	Pld	W	L
(Czech Republic) 2010	Did not qualify			
(Turkey) 2014	Did not qualify			
(Spain) 2018	Did not qualify			
(Australia) 2022	Did not qualify			
(Germany) 2026	Did not qualify			
(Japan) 2030	To be determined			

=== EuroBasket Women ===
EuroBasket Women					Qualification		
Year	Position	Pld	W	L	Pld	W	L
(Latvia) 2009	Division B				12	12	0
(Poland) 2011	6th place	9	7	2	8	6	2
(France) 2013	10th place	6	2	4	8	6	2
(Hungary) 2015	7th place	10	5	5	6	5	1
(Czech Republic) 2017	16th place	3	0	3	6	4	2
(Latvia) (Serbia) 2019	12th place	4	1	3	6	4	2
(France) (Spain) 2021	12th place	4	1	3	4	3	1
(Israel) (Slovenia) 2023	8th place	6	3	3	4	3	1
(Czech Republic) (Germany) (Italy) (Greece) 2025	15th place	3	0	3	6	4	2
(Belgium) (Finland) (Sweden) (Lithuania) 2027	To be determined				To be determined		
Total		45	19	26	60	47	13

== Team ==
=== Current roster ===
Roster for the EuroBasket Women 2025.

Montenegro women's national basketball team roster
Players
Coaches

Pos.	No.	Name	Age – Date of birth	Height	Club	Ctr.
PF	3	Bojana Kovačević	28 – 16 October 1996	1.86 m (6 ft 1 in)	Hapoel Petah Tikva	(Israel)
PG	4	Sofija Živaljević	27 – 24 December 1997	1.76 m (5 ft 9 in)	MBK Ružomberok	(Slovakia)
F	5	Jovana Pašić	33 – 12 May 1992	1.83 m (6 ft 0 in)	Hapoel Kfar Saba	(Israel)
SG	7	Zorana Radonjić	23 – 13 June 2002	1.73 m (5 ft 8 in)	Budućnost Podgorica	(Montenegro)
PG	10	Marija Baošić	20 – 12 October 2004	1.66 m (5 ft 5 in)	Budućnost Podgorica	(Montenegro)
PF	14	Nikolina Ilić	21 – 13 October 2003	1.80 m (5 ft 11 in)	Budućnost Podgorica	(Montenegro)
C	21	Maja Bigović	22 – 24 September 2002	1.95 m (6 ft 5 in)	Budućnost Podgorica	(Montenegro)
SG	23	Jelena Vučetić	31 – 14 September 1993	1.82 m (6 ft 0 in)	BC Castors Braine	(Belgium)
SG	24	Marija Baošić	24 – 5 February 2001	1.80 m (5 ft 11 in)	BG Göttingen	(Germany)
PG	25	Marija Leković	21 – 21 July 2003	1.66 m (5 ft 5 in)	Valencia Basket	(Spain)
F	35	Milica Jovanović (C)	35 – 14 August 1989	1.89 m (6 ft 2 in)	Maccabi Bnot Ashdod	(Israel)
G	88	Jelena Bulajić	18 – 27 February 2007	1.79 m (5 ft 10 in)	South Florida Bulls	(United States)

Head coach

- (Montenegro) Jelena Škerović

Assistant coach(es)

- (Scotland) Alexander Geddes

Legend

- (C) Team captain
- Club – describes last
  club before the tournament
- Age – describes age
  on 18 June 2025

=== Head coaches ===
Since its foundation, Montenegro women's national basketball team had four head coaches.
In the period 2008–2013, head coach of Montenegro was Miodrag Baletić. From 2014, Montenegrin team was led by Momir Milatović, who was head coach during three years. In 2017, first foreigner was promoted as head coach of Montenegrin team. That was Roberto Íñiguez, whose mandate lasted until the beginning of 2019.
In January 2019, Basketball Association of Montenegro stated that new head coach of national team is former player and captain Jelena Škerović. She became a first woman to be a head coach of any Montenegrin national A team.

Years	Name	Score	Competition
2008–2013	(Montenegro) Miodrag Baletić	33–10	EuroBasket 2011 (6th); EuroBasket 2013 (10th)
2014–2017	(Montenegro) Momir Milatović	14–8	EuroBasket 2015 (7th)
2017–2019	(Spain) Roberto Íñiguez	4–5	EuroBasket 2017 (16th)
2019–present	(Montenegro) Jelena Škerović	16–8	GSS 2019 (1st); EuroBasket 2019 (12); EuroBasket 2021 (12); GSS 2019 (1st); EuroBasket 2023 (8)

== Statistics and games ==
=== List of official matches ===
Montenengro played its first official match in August 2008. There is a List of official matches of the Montenegro women's national basketball team played since independence.

=== Opponents ===
Below is the list of performances of Montenegro national basketball team against every single opponent.

Opponents' country	G	W	L	PD
Albania	2	2	0	+118
Austria	2	2	0	+27
Belarus	1	1	0	+5
Belgium	1	0	1	-2
Bosnia and Herzegovina	2	1	1	+6
Bulgaria	2	1	1	-30
Croatia	2	1	1	+7
Czech Republic	2	2	0	+32
Cyprus	3	2	1	+71
Denmark	2	1	1	+4
Estonia	2	2	0	+52
Finland	4	4	0	+90
France	4	1	3	-85
Germany	3	3	0	+35
Great Britain	3	1	2	-17
Greece	3	2	1	+7
Hungary	2	2	0	+13
Iceland	5	5	0	+87
Ireland	2	2	0	+15
Israel	2	2	0	+33
Italy	5	2	3	0
Latvia	3	2	1	-14
Lithuania	2	2	0	+21
Luxembourg	3	3	0	+44
Malta	2	2	0	+63
Monaco	1	1	0	+10
Netherlands	2	2	0	+11
Poland	3	2	1	+23
Portugal	2	2	0	+13
Romania	1	1	0	+18
Russia	2	0	2	-32
Serbia	4	1	3	-16
Slovakia	3	2	1	+27
Slovenia	2	2	0	+29
Spain	5	1	4	-56
Sweden	4	1	3	-36
Switzerland	4	4	0	+85
Turkey	5	1	4	-30
Ukraine	4	3	1	+27
OVERALL	106	71	35	+653

Last update: September 22, 2023.

== Kit ==
=== Manufacturer ===
- 2008–2011: Kappa
- 2011–present: Peak

=== Sponsor ===
- 2008–2011: VOLI
- 2012–2014: diva
- 2014–2015: EPCG
- 2015–present: m:tel

== See also ==
- List of official matches of the Montenegro women's national basketball team
- Sport in Montenegro
- First А Women's Basketball League of Montenegro
- Montenegro national basketball team
