= EuroBasket Women 2013 qualification =

This page describes the qualification procedure for EuroBasket Women 2013. The Qualifying Round was held from June 12 to July 14, 2012. The top 2 teams in each group qualified for the 2013 edition.

== Qualifying round ==
| Group A | Group B | Group C | Group D | Group E |
|---|---|---|---|---|
| Belarus; Israel; Hungary; Ukraine; Portugal | Montenegro; Poland; Serbia; Estonia; Switzerland | Lithuania; Slovakia; Netherlands; Belgium; Slovenia | Spain; Germany; Bulgaria; Romania; Sweden | Latvia; Greece; Italy; Finland; Luxembourg |

== Qualifying ==
=== Group A ===
| Team | (Belarus) | (Israel) | (Hungary) | (Ukraine) | (Portugal) |
|---|---|---|---|---|---|
| Belarus | — | 69–61 | 51–47 | 68–60 | 63–41 |
| Israel | 60–58 | — | 46–64 | 73–58 | 58–47 |
| Hungary | 62–59 | 73–66 | — | 73–78 | 80–45 |
| Ukraine | 51–55 | 71–68 | 73–66 | — | 92–38 |
| Portugal | 53–82 | 60–62 | 53–73 | 42–55 | — |

| Team | G | W | L | PF | PA | Diff | Pts |
|---|---|---|---|---|---|---|---|
| Belarus | 8 | 6 | 2 | 505 | 435 | +70 | 14 |
| Ukraine | 8 | 5 | 3 | 538 | 483 | +55 | 13 |
| Hungary | 8 | 5 | 3 | 538 | 471 | +67 | 13 |
| Israel | 8 | 4 | 4 | 494 | 500 | −6 | 12 |
| Portugal | 8 | 0 | 8 | 379 | 565 | −186 | 8 |

=== Group B ===
| Team | (Montenegro) | (Poland) | (Serbia) | (Estonia) | (Switzerland) |
|---|---|---|---|---|---|
| Montenegro | — | 59–50 | 85–68 | 81–61 | 69–39 |
| Poland | 53–50 | — | 76–74 | 77–52 | 64–51 |
| Serbia | 72–56 | 67–62 | — | 101–50 | 88–64 |
| Estonia | 54–86 | 58–65 | 58–97 | — | 58–62 |
| Switzerland | 67–82 | 45–62 | 45–88 | 69–62 | — |

| Team | G | W | L | PF | PA | Diff | Pts |
|---|---|---|---|---|---|---|---|
| Montenegro | 8 | 6 | 2 | 568 | 464 | +104 | 14 |
| Serbia | 8 | 6 | 2 | 655 | 496 | +159 | 14 |
| Poland | 8 | 6 | 2 | 509 | 456 | +53 | 14 |
| Switzerland | 8 | 2 | 6 | 441 | 574 | −133 | 10 |
| Estonia | 8 | 0 | 8 | 454 | 637 | −183 | 8 |

=== Group C ===
| Team | (Lithuania) | (Slovakia) | (Netherlands) | (Belgium) | (Slovenia) |
|---|---|---|---|---|---|
| Lithuania | — | 78–64 | 88–47 | 61–53 | 65–46 |
| Slovakia | 60–58 | — | 70–48 | 64–49 | 93–54 |
| Netherlands | 42–63 | 51–66 | — | 74–59 | 71–64 |
| Belgium | 62–77 | 54–63 | 72–61 | — | 59–63 |
| Slovenia | 79–68 | 61–72 | 75–56 | 68–52 | — |

| Team | G | W | L | PF | PA | Diff | Pts |
|---|---|---|---|---|---|---|---|
| Slovakia | 8 | 7 | 1 | 552 | 453 | +99 | 22 |
| Lithuania | 8 | 6 | 2 | 558 | 453 | +105 | 17 |
| Slovenia | 8 | 4 | 4 | 510 | 538 | −28 | 12 |
| Netherlands | 8 | 2 | 6 | 448 | 550 | −102 | 4 |
| Belgium | 8 | 1 | 7 | 464 | 538 | −74 | 3 |

=== Group D ===
| Team | (Spain) | (Germany) | (Bulgaria) | (Romania) | (Sweden) |
|---|---|---|---|---|---|
| Spain | — | 66–39 | 64–48 | 68–54 | 73–79 |
| Germany | 55–61 | — | 77–56 | 70–60 | 62–73 |
| Bulgaria | 51–79 | 67–60 | — | 68–70 | 60–80 |
| Romania | 51–68 | 64–75 | 75–68 | — | 66–59 |
| Sweden | 78–69 | 68–58 | 71–54 | 93–78 | — |

| Team | G | W | L | PF | PA | Diff | Pts |
|---|---|---|---|---|---|---|---|
| Sweden | 8 | 7 | 1 | 601 | 520 | +81 | 15 |
| Spain | 8 | 6 | 2 | 548 | 455 | +93 | 14 |
| Germany | 8 | 3 | 5 | 496 | 515 | −19 | 11 |
| Romania | 8 | 3 | 5 | 518 | 569 | −51 | 11 |
| Bulgaria | 8 | 1 | 7 | 472 | 576 | −104 | 9 |

=== Group E ===
| Team | (Latvia) | (Greece) | (Italy) | (Finland) | (Luxembourg) |
|---|---|---|---|---|---|
| Latvia | — | 63–46 | 71–52 | 80–47 | 70–44 |
| Greece | 63–49 | — | 53–64 | 72–49 | 70–62 |
| Italy | 60–57 | 68–61 | — | 76–58 | 86–37 |
| Finland | 65–62 | 52–66 | 62–82 | — | 114–54 |
| Luxembourg | 60–95 | 61–85 | 66–88 | 45–90 | — |

| Team | G | W | L | PF | PA | Diff | Pts |
|---|---|---|---|---|---|---|---|
| Italy | 8 | 7 | 1 | 576 | 465 | +111 | 15 |
| Latvia | 8 | 5 | 3 | 547 | 437 | +110 | 13 |
| Greece | 8 | 5 | 3 | 516 | 468 | +48 | 13 |
| Finland | 8 | 3 | 5 | 539 | 537 | +2 | 11 |
| Luxembourg | 8 | 0 | 8 | 429 | 700 | −271 | 8 |
