= Roberto Íñiguez =

Spanish basketball player and manager

Roberto Íñiguez de Heredia
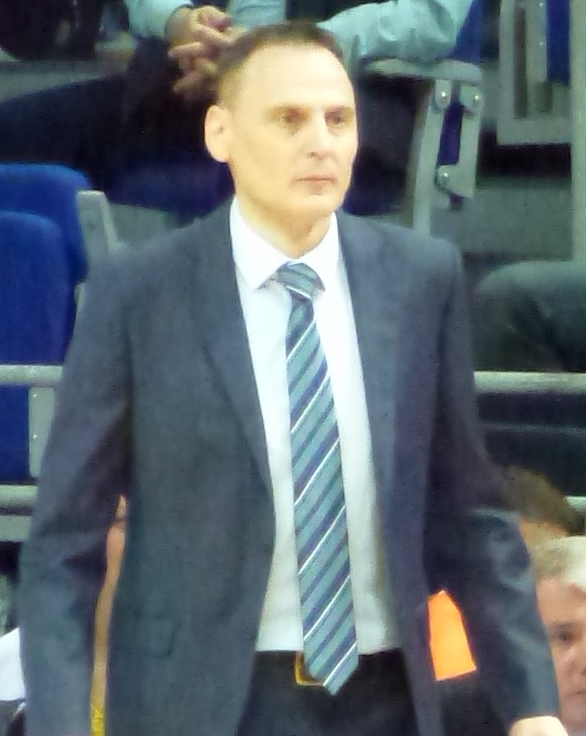

Çukurova Basketbol
- Position: Head coach

Personal information
- Born: 5 September 1967 (age 59) Vitoria-Gasteiz, Basque Country, Spain

Career information
- Playing career: 1986–1996

Career history

Playing
- 1986–1987: Baskonia
- 1987–1990: Valencia
- 1990–1992: Gran Canaria
- 1992–1993: Murcia
- 1993–1994: Tizona Burgos
- 1994–1995: L'Horta
- 1995–1996: Gandía

Coaching
- 2003–2011: Valencia Basket
- 2011–2012: Ros Casares Valencia
- 2012–2014: Fenerbahçe Istanbul
- 2015: Uni Girona
- 2015–2017: Nadezhda Orenburg
- 2017: Montenegro
- 2017–2019: WB SOPRON
- 2019–2020: Dynamo Kursk
- 2021: Perfumerías Avenida

Roberto Íñiguez de Heredia Santamaria (born 5 September 1967) is a former Spanish basketball player and the current head coach of Spar Girona. Iñiguez spent most of his career with Valencia BC.

He played for Saski Baskonia, Valencia BC, CB Murcia, CB Gran Canaria, Valencia Godella and Gandía BA as a player for 12 years in his career.

He started as a coach with Valencia BC. With them he worked in different teams for eight years; Junior, U20, 2nd team and worked with young players of the first team to improve them. He coached the Valencia BC Junior Team as head coach for 2003/04 season and Valencia BC Under 20 Team between 2004 and 2006. From 2006 to 2010 he worked as coach of second team in Valencia. Then he signed with Ros Casares Valencia. He won EuroLeague Women and Spanish League with a historic record in Spain; they won this competition without losing any games in either the regular season or the playoffs.

In 2012, Íñiguez signed with Fenerbahçe, where he coached for two seasons in Turkey.

In February 2015, he returned to Spain and signed with Catalan squad Uni Girona. With Uni Girona he won the Spanish League for the second time without losing any games, so he is still undefeated in this competition with a 42/0 record.

After winning the Spanish Championship again in summer 2015, he signed a contract for 2015–2016 with Russian team Nadezhda Orenburg where he coached Orenburg's team in EuroLeague and Russian league for two seasons.

When he finished that season he signed a contract for two years with WB Sopron and four years with Montenegro Federation to coach Montenegro NT.

During the 2019–2020 season he was the coach of another powerful Russian club, Dynamo Kursk.

From 2020-2022 he was coaching Perfumerias Avenida where he got two Euroleague medals and he was named Coach of the season both.

He left Avenida 2023 to work in Turkey for Cukurova Mersin where he was runner up in Euroleague 2023.

Currently he is coaching Spar Girona.

== Honors ==
Ros Casares Valencia (2011–12)

- EuroLeague Women: 2011-12
- Liga Femenina de Baloncesto: 2011-12

Fenerbahçe Istanbul (2012–14)

- Presıdent Cup of Turkey: 2012
- EuroLeague Women: 2012-13 runner-up
- Turkish League TKBL 2012-13
- Coach of the year in Turkey: 2013
- President Cup of Turkey: 2013
- EuroLeague Women: 2013–14 runner-up.

Uni Girona (2014–15)

- Liga Femenina de Baloncesto: 2014-15

Nadezhda Orenburg (2015-2017)

- EuroLeague Women: 2016 Runner-up
- Russian league: 2016 Runner-up
- Coach of the year in Russia: 2016
- Coach of the season EuroLeague: 2016

WB Sophron (2017-2019)

- Hungarian League 2018
- Hungarian League 2019
- Hungarian Cup 2019
- EuroLeague runner up 2018
- EuroLeague Final Four 2019
- EuroLeague Coach of the year 2018

Dynamo Kursk (2019–20)

- Russian Cup 2019
