= Miodrag Baletić =

Montenegrin basketball coach (1948–2021)

Personal information
- Born: 15 October 1948 PR Montenegro, FPR Yugoslavia
- Died: 12 March 2021 (aged 72) Nikšić, Montenegro
- Position: Head coach
- Coaching career: 1971–2018

Career history

Coaching
- 1971–1982: Sutjeska
- 1982–1984: San Diego (assistant)
- 1984–1985: Lovćen
- 1985–1986: Primorje
- 1985–1986: BC Troyes
- 1988–1991: Budućnost
- 1991–1992: Bosna
- 1992–1993: Borac Banja Luka
- 1993–1994: Ibon Nikšić
- 1994–1995: MZT Skopje
- 1996–1997: Primorje
- 1997–1998: Borac Banja Luka
- 1998–1999: Roling Nikšić
- 1998–1999: Yugoslavia U18
- 2001–2002: FMP Železnik
- 2002: Vojvodina
- 2002–2004: Budućnost Podgorica
- 2004–2005: Swisslion Vršac
- 2005–2006: Jedinstvo Bijelo Polje
- 2006–2007: Mogren
- 2007–2014: Montenegro Women
- 2008–2010: Željezničar Women
- 2014–2015: Bashkimi Prizren
- 2018: Teuta Durrës

Miodrag Baletić (15 October 1948 – 12 March 2021) was a Montenegrin professional basketball coach.

== Career ==
He coached the Montenegro women's national basketball team at two editions of the European Championship, in 2011 and 2013.
