= Alexandra Mollenhauer =

American-Azerbaijani basketball player (born 1998)

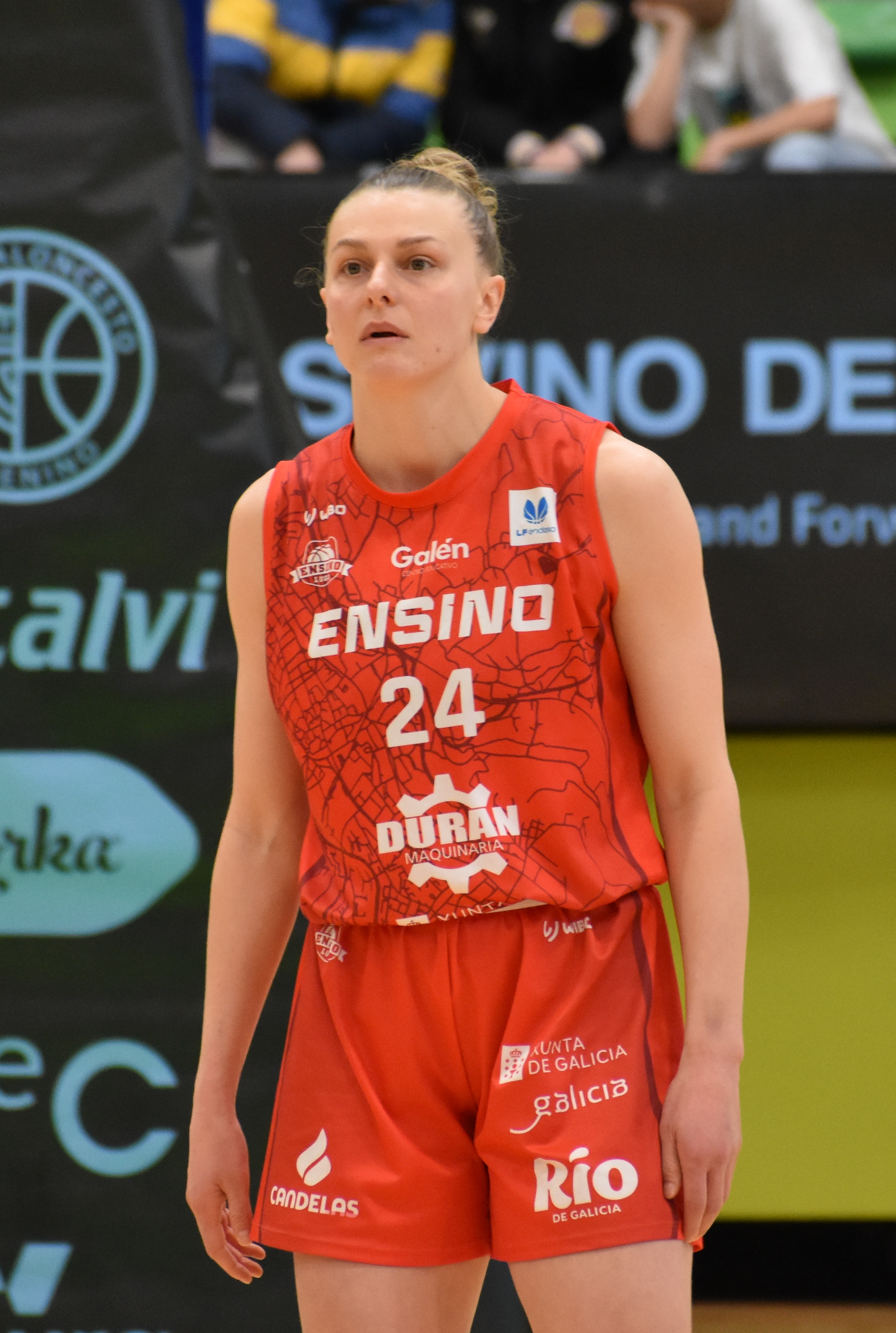
- Mollenhauer at 2024–25 Liga Femenina de Baloncesto

Personal information
- Born: May 4, 1998 (age 28) Lindale, Texas, U.S.
- Listed height: 6 ft 0 in (1.83 m)

Career information
- Playing career: 2013–present
- Position: Small forward
- Number: 24

Career history
- 2013: Caspian Lions
- 2015: Məşəl-3
- 2016: Məşəl-1
- 2014–2023: Neftchi
- 2025–present: Araski AES
Medals
Women's basketball
Representing Azerbaijan
FIBA 3x3 Europe Cup
Silver medal – second place	2025 Copenhagen	Team
Bronze medal – third place	2026 Antwerp	Team
Islamic Solidarity Games
Gold medal – first place	2017 Baku	3x3 basketball
Gold medal – first place	2021 Konya	3x3 basketball
Gold medal – first place	2025 Riyadh	3x3 basketball

Alexandra Joy Mollenhauer (born May 4, 1998) is a professional basketball player for Araski AES of the Primera FEB. Standing at 6 ft 0 in (1.83 m), she plays as a small forward. Born in the United States, she is a member of the Azerbaijan women's national 3x3 team. She is a three-time winner of the Islamic Solidarity Games (2017, 2021, 2025).

== Early life ==
Alexandra Mollenhauer was born on May 4, 1998, in Texas in the United States to basketball player Scott Mollenhauer, who at one time played for such Azerbaijani clubs as Gala, NTD and Aztop, and after finishing his career, remained in Azerbaijan and began working as a coach.

When Mollenhauer was 5 years old, her family moved to Azerbaijan, where she began playing basketball under the guidance of her father. Mollenhauer lived in Azerbaijan until she was 18, and then moved to the United States.

== Professional career ==
At the age of 15–16, Mollenhauer had been recruited by the Azerbaijani national basketball team.

In 2017, Mollenhauer won gold as part of the Azerbaijani national team at the III Islamic Solidarity Games in Baku. In August 2022, at the IV Islamic Solidarity Games in Konya, the Azerbaijani national team with Mollenhauer in the team managed to defend the title of champion of the Islamic Games.

In April 2024, the Azerbaijani national team with Mollenhauer in the team became the winner of the 3x3 basketball qualification tournament in Hong Kong, for the first time in history, the team qualified for the 2024 Summer Olympics in Paris.

== Personal life ==
Mollenhauer's father, Scott Mollenhauer, is an assistant coach for the Azerbaijan women's basketball team.
