= Finland women's national basketball team =

Women's national basketball team representing Finland

Finland
- FIBA ranking: 69 ▼3 (14 September 2026)
- Joined FIBA: 1939
- FIBA zone: FIBA Europe
- National federation: Basketball Finland
- Coach: Pekka Salminen

Olympic Games
- Appearances: None

World Cup
- Appearances: None

EuroBasket Women
- Appearances: 6
- Medals: None
Home	Away
Medal record
FISU World University Games
Bronze medal – third place	2021 Chengdu	Team

The Finland women's national basketball team represents Finland in international women's basketball competitions. They are governed by Basketball Finland.

Finland has appeared in five editions of the EuroBasket between 1952 and 1987, with 6 wins in 34 matches. It hasn't qualified for a major tournament since. until they did for the 2027 edition as co-host along with Belgium, Sweden and Lithuania.

== Competitive record ==
=== Women's Basketball World Cup ===
FIBA Women's Basketball World Cup
Year	Position	Pld	W	L
(Chile) 1953	Did not qualify			
(Brazil) 1957	Did not qualify			
(Soviet Union) 1959	Did not qualify			
(Peru) 1964	Did not qualify			
(Czechoslovakia) 1967	Did not qualify			
(Brazil) 1971	Did not qualify			
(Colombia) 1975	Did not qualify			
(South Korea) 1979	Did not qualify			
(Brazil) 1983	Did not qualify			
(Soviet Union) 1986	Did not qualify			
(Malaysia) 1990	Did not qualify			
(Australia) 1994	Did not qualify			
(Germany) 1998	Did not qualify			
(China) 2002	Did not qualify			
(Brazil) 2006	Did not qualify			
(Czech Republic) 2010	Did not qualify			
(Turkey) 2014	Did not qualify			
(Spain) 2018	Did not qualify			
(Australia) 2022	Did not qualify			
(Germany) 2026	Did not qualify			
(Japan) 2030	To be determined			
Total	TBD	0	0	0

=== EuroBasket Women ===
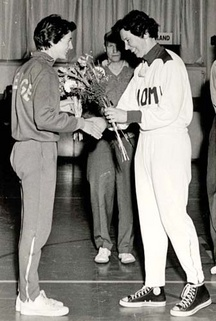
Hilkka Hakola was the first Finnish female basketball player at the top international level. He represented the Finnish national team at the European Championships in 1952 and 1956

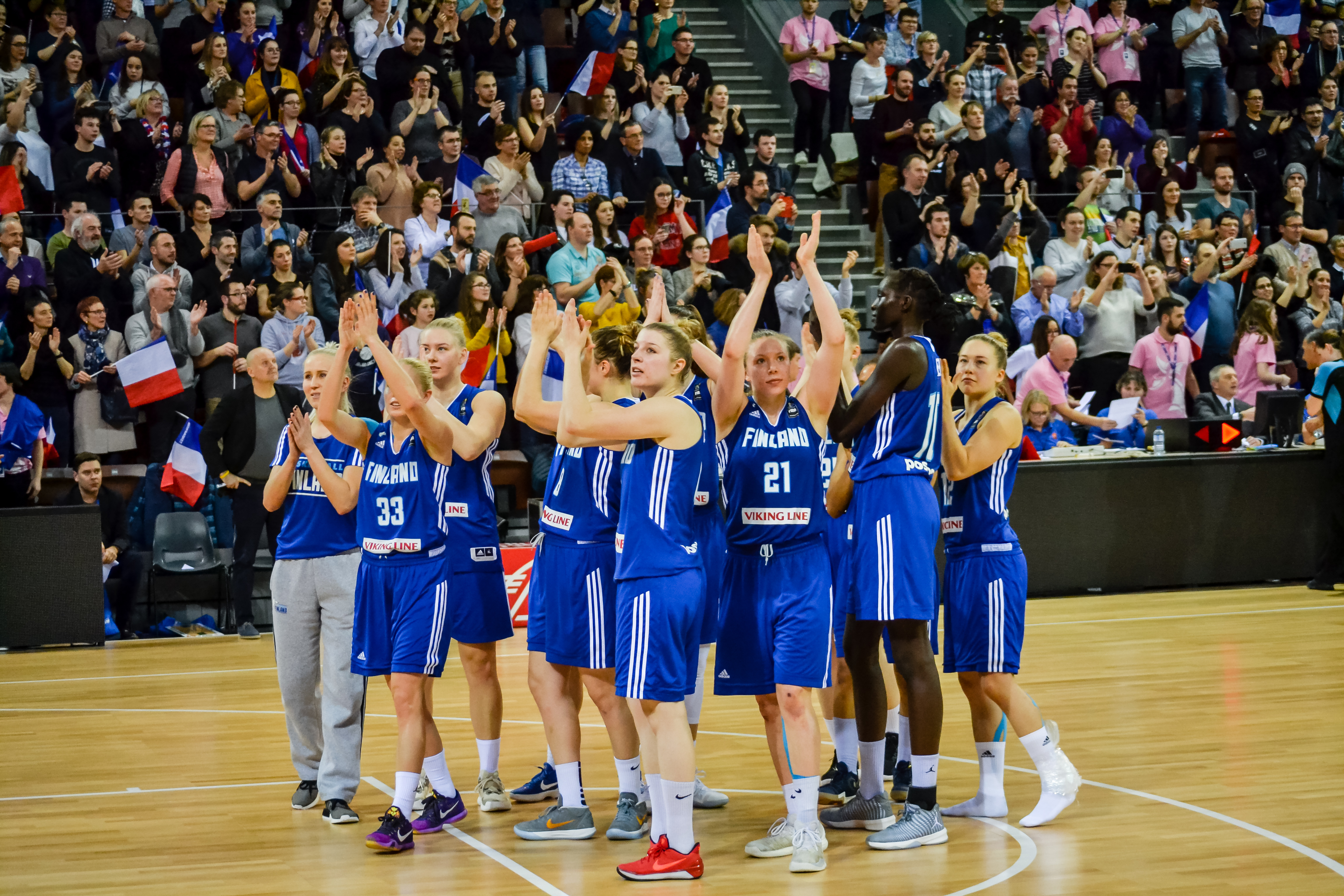
Finland Women's team at 2019 EuroBasket qualification

EuroBasket Women					Qualification			
Year	Position	Pld	W	L	Outcome	Pld	W	L
(Italy) 1938	Did not enter				Did not enter			
(Hungary) 1950	Did not qualify							
(Soviet Union) 1952	11th	5	1	4				
(Socialist Federal Republic of Yugoslavia) 1954	Did not qualify							
(Czechoslovakia) 1956	11th	8	3	5				
(Poland) 1958	Did not qualify							
(Bulgaria) 1960	Did not qualify							
(France) 1962	Did not qualify							
(Hungary) 1964	Did not qualify							
(Romania) 1966	Did not qualify							
(Italy) 1968	Did not qualify							
(Netherlands) 1970	Did not qualify							
(Bulgaria) 1972	Did not qualify							
(Italy) 1974	Did not qualify							
(France) 1976	Did not qualify							
(Poland) 1978	Did not qualify				Qualification	4	1	3
(Socialist Federal Republic of Yugoslavia) 1980	12th	13	7	6	Qualification	5	5	0
(Italy) 1981	12th	5	1	4	Qualification	2	1	1
(Hungary) 1983	Did not qualify				Qualification	4	2	2
(Italy) 1985	Did not qualify				Qualification	3	0	3
(Spain) 1987	12th	5	0	5	Qualification	3	2	1
(Bulgaria) 1989	Did not qualify				Qualification	5	2	3
(Israel) 1991	Did not qualify				pre-Qualification	5	4	1
(Italy) 1993	Did not qualify				Qualification	5	3	2
(Czech Republic) 1995	Did not qualify				Qualification	5	0	5
(Hungary) 1997	Did not qualify				Qualification	11	7	4
(Poland) 1999	Did not qualify				pre-Qualification	4	2	2
(France) 2001	Did not qualify				Qualification	11	4	7
(Greece) 2003	Did not qualify				Qualification	9	3	6
(Turkey) 2005	Did not qualify				Qualification	6	2	4
(Italy) 2007	Did not qualify				Qualification	4	0	4
(Latvia) 2009	Did not qualify				Qualification	8	1	7
(Poland) 2011	Did not qualify				Qualification	8	0	8
(France) 2013	Did not qualify				Qualification	8	3	5
(Hungary) (Romania) 2015	Did not qualify				Qualification	8	1	7
(Czech Republic) 2017	Did not qualify				Qualification	4	0	4
(Latvia) (Serbia) 2019	Did not qualify				Qualification	6	0	6
(France) (Spain) 2021	Did not qualify				Qualification	6	1	5
(Israel) (Slovenia) 2023	Did not qualify				Qualification	6	0	6
(Czech Republic) (Germany) (Italy) (Greece) 2025	Did not qualify				Qualification	6	2	4
(Belgium) (Finland) (Sweden) (Lithuania) 2027	Qualified as co-host				Qualified as co-host			
Total	11th place	36	12	24		146	46	100

== 2021 Roster ==
Roster for the EuroBasket Women 2021 qualification.

Finland women's national basketball team roster
Players
Coaches

Pos.	No.	Name	Age – Date of birth	Height	Club	Ctr.
G	4	Kati Ollilainen	17 – 26 April 2003	1.73 m (5 ft 8 in)	HBA-Märsky	(Finland)
PF	5	Sofia Pelander	28 – 4 August 1992	1.90 m (6 ft 3 in)	Herner TC	(Germany)
G	7	Elina Koskimies	24 – 2 October 1996	1.80 m (5 ft 11 in)	GDKO Ibaizabal	(Spain)
F	8	Lotta Vesiluoma	23 – 24 August 1997	1.72 m (5 ft 8 in)	Espoo Basket Team	(Finland)
PF	9	Awak Kuier	19 – 19 August 2001	1.94 m (6 ft 4 in)	Virtus Eirene	(Italy)
PF	10	Helmi Tulonen	22 – 9 December 1998	1.89 m (6 ft 2 in)	GDKO Ibaizabal	(Spain)
C	11	Marianne Kalin	23 – 27 May 1997	1.93 m (6 ft 4 in)	Bembibre	(Spain)
PG	12	Linda-Lotta Lehtoranta	29 – 7 October 1991	1.75 m (5 ft 9 in)	PeKa	(Finland)
F	13	Veera Pirttinen	23 – 24 June 1997	1.80 m (5 ft 11 in)	Catz Lappeenranta	(Finland)
PF	14	Annika Holopainen	27 – 4 August 1993	1.86 m (6 ft 1 in)	KR	(Iceland)
PF	15	Anniina Äijänen	25 – 1 October 1995	1.89 m (6 ft 2 in)	Universitario de Ferrol	(Spain)
G	21	Henna Sandvik	17 – 26 May 2003	1.80 m (5 ft 11 in)	Tapiolan Honka	(Finland)
G	22	Saga Ukkonen	19 – 28 April 2001	1.75 m (5 ft 9 in)	HBA-Märsky	(Finland)
SG	26	Elina Aarnisalo	15 – 26 July 2005	1.76 m (5 ft 9 in)	Tapiolan Honka	(Finland)

Head coach

- (Finland) Pekka Salminen

Assistant coach(es)

- (Finland) Mirka Dettmann
- (Finland) Jari Nykänen
- (Finland) Niko Hellman

Legend

- Club – describes last
  club before the competition
- Age – describes age
  on 4 February 2021

== 2011 Roster ==
- Guards
  - [1.83] Krista Gross
  - [1.70] Anette Juvonen
  - [1.73] Vilma Kesänen
  - [1.75] Linda Lehtoranta
  - [1.72] Reetta Piipari
- Forwards
  - [1.82] Evita Iiskola
  - [1.83] Henna Koponen
  - [1.85] Heta Korpivaara
  - [1.74] Dionne Pounds
  - [1.77] Henna Salomaa
  - [1.87] Minna Sten
  - [1.89] Tiina Sten
  - [1.90] Taru Tuukkanen
  - [1.80] Hanna Vapamaa

== See also ==
- Finland women's national under-19 basketball team
- Finland women's national under-17 basketball team
- Finland women's national 3x3 team
