= Ireland women's national basketball team =

Ireland
- FIBA ranking: 79 ▼2 (14 September 2026)
- Joined FIBA: 1947
- FIBA zone: FIBA Europe
- National federation: Basketball Ireland
- Coach: James Weldon
- Nickname(s): Na cailíní i nglas (The Girls in Green)

Olympic Games
- Appearances: None

World Cup
- Appearances: None

EuroBasket
- Appearances: None

Championship for Small Countries
- Appearances: 7
- Medals: (silver) Silver: (1989, 1991, 1993, 2016, 2021)
Home	Away

The Ireland women's national basketball team represents Ireland in international women's basketball. The team was originally organised by the Amateur Basketball Association of Ireland, which underwent several organisation restructures until it became Basketball Ireland (BI). A number of players on the current squad also play in the Irish Women's Super League. As of 2026, the team was ranked 77th in the FIBA Women's World Ranking. They play their home games at the National Basketball Arena in Tallaght.

== History ==
=== 20th century ===
In 1945, the Amateur Basketball Association of Ireland (ABAI) was formed. The ABAI was the original national governing body for basketball in Ireland, and it paved the way for a national league to form in 1973. 1973 was also when the first ever Irish women's national basketball team was formed. In the same year, the team defeated Scotland in an exhibition match. In 1974, the squad went on an international trip to Poland to represent Ireland on the official Fédération Internationale de Basketball Amateur (FIBA), or the International Basketball Federation, European stage. In 1980, the ABAI changed its name to the Irish Basketball Association (IBA). A team representing Ireland also participated in the 1980 FIBA World Olympic Qualifying Tournament for Women, but did not qualify.

As of 1989, the Ireland women's team was contesting the European Promotion Cup for Women, and placed second in the competition.

=== 2000s-present ===
In 2003, the IBA re-branded itself to Basketball Ireland (BI) to become a centralised organisation. In February 2010, during the Irish financial crisis, Basketball Ireland announced that it was €1.2m in debt and would deactivate its senior international squads to cut costs. A team representing Ireland was reformed in 2013, when a "Premier League All Stars" team played Wales in a match to mark The Gathering Ireland 2013 festival. Ireland also competed in 3x3 basketball at the 2014 Europe Championships and the 2015 European Games.

In late 2015, it was announced that the national team would again join official FIBA Europe competitions after accepting an invitation to play the 2016 FIBA Women's European Championship for Small Countries. The Irish team came second in the 2016 event, after losing to Malta in the final. An Irish team also entered the 2018 event (which took place in Cork) and placed sixth.

Before a FIBA Women's EuroBasket 2025 qualifier, held in February 2024, in response to "inflammatory and wholly inaccurate accusations of anti-Semitism [..] published on official Israeli [Basketball] federation channels", members of the team "boycotted the usual pre-match pleasantries" and did not shake hands with the Israeli team. A number of Irish team members also opted not to travel to the game, which had been postponed from November 2023 and moved to Riga in Latvia due to the Gaza war. Ireland lost the game by 30 points.

== Squad ==
As of 2026 (EuroBasket Women 2027 qualifiers), the squad included:

Ireland women's national basketball team roster
Players

Pos.	No.	Name	Height	Club
F/C	3	Michelle Clarke	1.77 m	(Republic of Ireland) Killester BC
G	5	Kate Hickey	1.82 m	(Republic of Ireland) Waterford Wildcats
F	6	Sarah Hickey	1.82 m	(Republic of Ireland) Waterford Wildcats
PG	7	Hazel Finn	1.72 m	(Republic of Ireland) Trinity Meteors
G	8	Enya Maguire	1.67 m	ŽKK Croatia Zagreb
F/C	9	Emer Dunne	1.88 m	(Republic of Ireland) Glanmire
PG	11	Edel Thornton (C)	1.70 m	(Republic of Ireland) Brunell
F	12	Abigail Rafferty	1.84 m	ŽKK Croatia Zagreb
C	13	Claire Melia	1.90 m	(Spain) Baxi Ferrol
F	15	Bridget Herlihy	1.88 m	Retired
PG	15	Annaliese Murphy	1.65 m	(Republic of Ireland) Glanmire BC
F	17	Maura Fitzpatick	1.78 m	(Scotland) Caledonia Gladiators
SG	23	Sorcha Tiernan	1.74 m	(Republic of Ireland) Liffey Celtics
G/F	26	Caitlin Gloeckner	1.70 m	(Republic of Ireland) Clevland Rockets (Belfast)
F	32	Lorraine Scanlon	1.82 m	(Republic of Ireland) St Pauls Killarney
G	40	Bronagh Power Cassidy	1.81 m	(United States) Villanova Wildacts

=== Depth chart ===
Pos.	Starting 5
F	Sarah Hickey
F	Lorraine Scanlon
PG	Edel Thornton
G	Bronagh Power-Cassidy
PG	Hazel Finn

== Notable players ==
Former notable members of the Ireland women's national basketball team include:

- Sandie Fitzgibbon, a dual-sport athlete who earned 64 basketball caps for the national team and was named to the camogie "Team of the Century".
- Susan Moran, who was inducted into the Basketball Ireland Hall of Fame in 2019 and a coach with the Saint Joseph's Hawks women's basketball team
- Lindsay Peat, Ireland women's rugby union international player who won an All-Ireland title with the Dublin county ladies' football team and co-captained the national basketball team
- Orla O'Reilly, previously captained the national team and played in Australia.
- Fionnuala Toner, basketball and netball player

== See also ==
- Ireland women's national under-18 basketball team
- Ireland women's national under-16 basketball team
- Ireland women's national 3x3 team
