= Estonia women's national basketball team =

Estonia
- FIBA ranking: 70 ▼3 (14 September 2026)
- Joined FIBA: 1934; 1991
- FIBA zone: FIBA Europe
- National federation: Estonian Basketball Association
- Coach: Toomas Annuk

Olympic Games
- Appearances: None

World Cup
- Appearances: None

EuroBasket
- Appearances: None
Home	Away

The Estonia women's national basketball team (Estonian: Eesti naiste korvpallimeeskond) represents Estonia in international women's basketball matches. They are controlled by the Estonian Basketball Association.

== History ==
Women's basketball in Estonia began to develop in the early 20th century, with organized competitions being established during the interwar period. Following the country’s independence after the collapse of the Soviet Union in 1991, Estonia re-established its national basketball federation and entered international competition under the flag of the Estonian Basketball Association.

The Estonia women's national team made its debut in EuroBasket Women qualification during the 1990s. While the team did not advance to the main tournament, these early appearances marked the beginning of its modern international program.

Through the 2000s and 2010s, Estonia continued to participate in EuroBasket Women qualification rounds, often competing against some of Europe’s most established national teams such as Spain, France, and Russia. Despite consistent efforts, the team has yet to qualify for the EuroBasket Women final tournament.

Regionally, Estonia has found greater success in the Baltic Cup and friendly tournaments, where it has faced neighboring teams from Latvia and Lithuania. These competitions have played a key role in developing local talent and providing international experience for younger players.

In the 2020s, the Estonian women’s team has continued to build around a new generation of players competing in the domestic Estonian Women's Basketball League and professional leagues abroad. While still seeking its first major tournament qualification, the program remains focused on long-term development and strengthening its position within European women’s basketball.

== Team ==
=== Current roster ===
Roster for the EuroBasket Women 2025 qualification fixtures against Great Britain and Sweden in February 2025.

Estonia women's national basketball team roster
Players
Coaches

Pos.	No.	Name	Age – Date of birth	Height	Club	Ctr.
PG	4	Sofia Kosareva	26 – 22 December 1998	1.70 m (5 ft 7 in)	TSA Kalev	(Estonia)
G	5	Tea Adams	25 – 10 May 1999	1.75 m (5 ft 9 in)	Caledonia Gladiators	(United Kingdom)
F	7	Kadri-Ann Lass	28 – 24 November 1996	1.91 m (6 ft 3 in)	BC Nokia	(Finland)
F/C	8	Jessica Ristimets	16 – 26 May 2008	1.81 m (5 ft 11 in)	Pärnu Spordikool	(Estonia)
PG	9	Marleen Mikiver	18 – 25 May 2006	1.73 m (5 ft 8 in)	Noorteliiga	(Estonia)
G	10	Katlin Kangur	18 – 14 August 2006	1.70 m (5 ft 7 in)	TSA KALEV	(Estonia)
F/C	12	Maaja Bratka	32 – 16 June 1992	1.90 m (6 ft 3 in)	CD Zamarat	(Spain)
G	13	Kayla Frier	17 – 18 September 2007	1.75 m (5 ft 9 in)	TalTech Basketball	(Estonia)
G/F	15	Keandra Koorits	19 – 17 February 2005	1.85 m (6 ft 1 in)	Washington State Cougars	(United States)
G/F	17	Greeta Uprus	30 – 28 May 1994	1.78 m (5 ft 10 in)	Pharmaserv Marburg	(Germany)
F	18	Lisa Sirgi	18 – 1 February 2007	1.95 m (6 ft 5 in)	TalTech Basketball	(Estonia)

Head coach

- Kaspars Majenieks

Assistant coach(es)

Legend

- (C) Team captain
- Club – describes last
  club before the tournament
- Age – describes age on
  9 February 2025

=== Past Roster ===
Roster for the EuroBasket Women 2019 qualification.

Estonia women's national basketball team roster
Players
Coaches

Pos.	No.	Name	Age – Date of birth	Height	Club	Ctr.
PF	5	Jane Svilberg	23 – 3 April 1995	1.81 m (5 ft 11 in)	Audentese Spordiklubi	(Estonia)
G	6	Kati Rausberg	29 – 13 October 1989	1.72 m (5 ft 8 in)	Tallinna Ülikool	(Estonia)
PF	8	Annika Köster	26 – 22 July 1992	1.85 m (6 ft 1 in)	Tallinna Ülikool	(Estonia)
SF	11	Mailis Pokk (C)	26 – 13 May 1992	1.86 m (6 ft 1 in)	Basket Landes	(France)
PG	13	Birgit Piibur	24 – 14 August 1994	1.64 m (5 ft 5 in)	Tallinna Ülikool	(Estonia)
SG	14	Janeli Lilleallik	24 – 12 February 1994	1.68 m (5 ft 6 in)	Visby Ladies	(Sweden)
PG	15	Johanna Teder	18 – 5 February 2000	1.73 m (5 ft 8 in)	G4S Noorteliiga	(Estonia)
PF	17	Martha-Liisa Oinitš	18 – 12 April 2000	1.90 m (6 ft 3 in)	G4S Noorteliiga	(Estonia)
PG	21	Anna Gret Asi	16 – 21 February 2002	1.77 m (5 ft 10 in)	Tartu Ülikool/Kalev	(Estonia)
PG	22	Sofia Kosareva	19 – 22 December 1998	1.70 m (5 ft 7 in)	Tallinna Ülikool	(Estonia)
SG	24	Janne Pulk	18 – 28 January 2000	1.71 m (5 ft 7 in)	G4S Noorteliiga	(Estonia)
PF	31	Kätlin Korjus	22 – 31 May 1996	1.80 m (5 ft 11 in)	Tallinna Ülikool	(Estonia)
SF	33	Rosemary Rits	26 – 29 October 1992	1.80 m (5 ft 11 in)	Franconville	(France)

Head coach

- Janne Schasmin

Assistant coach(es)

- Toomas Annuk
- Allan Siimann

Legend

- (C) Team captain
- Club – describes last
  club before the tournament
- Age – describes age on
  17 November 2018

== See also ==
- Estonia national basketball team
- Estonia women's national 3x3 team
- Estonia women's national under-20 basketball team
- Estonia women's national under-18 basketball team
- Estonia women's national under-16 basketball team
- Sport in Estonia
