= Portugal women's national basketball team =

Portugal
- FIBA ranking: 40 ▼2 (18 March 2026)
- Joined FIBA: 1932
- FIBA zone: FIBA Europe
- National federation: FPB
- Coach: Ricardo Vasconcelos

FIBA EuroBasket Women
- Appearances: 1
Home	Away

The Portugal women's national basketball team represents Portugal in international women's basketball competition. It is organized and run by the Portuguese Basketball Federation (FPB).

== EuroBasket Women record ==
EuroBasket Women 2025	12th place
EuroBasket Women 2027	To be determined

== Current roster ==
Roster for the EuroBasket Women 2025.

Portugal women's national basketball team roster
Players
Coaches

Pos.	No.	Name	Age – Date of birth	Height	Club	Ctr.
G	1	Joana Soeiro	30 – 24 January 1995	1.70 m (5 ft 7 in)	CD Zamarat	(Spain)
F	2	Maianca Umabano	28 – 1 May 1997	1.80 m (5 ft 11 in)	GDESSA	(Portugal)
PG	4	Inês Viana	30 – 10 July 1994	1.66 m (5 ft 5 in)	Benfica	(Portugal)
PG	5	Carolina Rodrigues	26 – 25 September 1998	1.69 m (5 ft 7 in)	Elfic Fribourg	(Switzerland)
SF	9	Laura Ferreira	29 – 19 June 1995	1.80 m (5 ft 11 in)	La Tronche-Meylan	(France)
SG	10	Maria Bettencourt	34 – 28 February 1991	1.72 m (5 ft 8 in)	Azul Marino Mallorca	(Spain)
PF	11	Lavínia da Silva	37 – 1 April 1988	1.87 m (6 ft 2 in)	Oaklands Wolves	(England)
SF	13	Josephine Filipe	29 – 11 October 1995	1.78 m (5 ft 10 in)	CB Al-Qazeres	(Spain)
C	14	Sofia da Silva	34 – 30 July 1990	1.90 m (6 ft 3 in)	Azul Marino Mallorca	(Spain)
SF	18	Mariana Silva	26 – 18 May 1999	1.84 m (6 ft 0 in)	Benfica	(Portugal)
SG	31	Márcia da Costa	35 – 13 December 1989	1.74 m (5 ft 9 in)	Castors Braine	(Belgium)
C	99	Carolina Cruz	24 – 17 April 2001	1.92 m (6 ft 4 in)	Galli Basket	(Italy)

Head coach

- (Portugal) Ricardo Vasconcelos

Assistant coach(es)

- (Portugal) José Araújo

Legend

- (C) Team captain
- Club – describes last
  club before the tournament
- Age – describes age
  on 18 June 2025

== See also ==
- Portugal women's national under-19 basketball team
- Portugal women's national under-17 basketball team
- Portugal men's national basketball team
