= Spain women's national basketball team results =

Results of Spain women's national basketball team since 1963, as recognized by the Spanish Basketball Federation: Olympic Games, World Cups, EuroBaskets and their respective qualifying tournaments, as well as two editions of the Mediterranean Games when the A-team was involved. Also included, friendly games and tournaments against national teams.

	Meaning		Meaning
1R	First / Preliminary Round	QF	Quarter-final
2R	Second Round	SF	Semifinal
MR	Main Round	3P	Bronze Match
CR	Classification Round	F	Final

Note: updated through 17 November 2026

M	OPPONENT	F	A	+/-	TOP SCORER(S)	PTS	EVENT	DATE	LOCATION
817	Croatia						2027 EuroBasket qualification	2027.02.16	
816	Bulgaria						2027 EuroBasket qualification	2027.02.13	
815	Czech Republic						2027 EuroBasket qualification	2027.02.10	
814	Croatia	91	72	+19	Raquel Carrera	24	2027 EuroBasket qualification	2026.11.17	Poreč (CRO)
813	Bulgaria	85	64	+21	Iyana Martín	26	2027 EuroBasket qualification	2026.11.14	Samokov (BUL)
812	Czech Republic	73	71	+2	Iyana Martín	18	2027 EuroBasket qualification	2026.11.10	Oviedo
811	Germany	81	58	+23	Iyana Martín	22	2026 World Cup 3P	2026.09.13	Berlin (GER)
810	United States	66	76	-10	Conde, Martín	17	2026 World Cup SF	2026.09.12	Berlin (GER)
809	Australia	89	66	+23	Megan Gustafson	16	2026 World Cup QF	2026.09.10	Berlin (GER)
808	Japan	79	59	+20	Iyana Martín	20	2026 World Cup 1R	2026.09.07	Berlin (GER)
807	Mali	73	82	-9	Iyana Martín	20	2026 World Cup 1R	2026.09.05	Berlin (GER)
806	Germany	83	53	+30	Awa Fam	17	2026 World Cup 1R	2026.09.04	Berlin (GER)
805	China	72	71	+1	Ortiz, Martín	13	2026 Friendly	2026.08.30	Zaragoza
804	Mali	97	58	+39	Torrens, Martín	13	2026 Friendly	2026.08.29	Zaragoza
803	Belgium	95	67	+28	Pueyo, Martín	15	2026 Friendly	2026.08.23	Santa Cruz de Tenerife
802	Nigeria	83	58	+25	Iyana Martín	15	2026 Friendly	2026.08.21	Santa Cruz de Tenerife
801	Germany	65	60	+5	Iyana Martín	19	2026 Friendly	2026.08.15	Ludwigsburg (GER)
800	United States	70	84	-14	Carrera, Gustafson	15	2026 World Cup qualification	2026.03.17	San Juan (PUR)
799	Italy	56	68	-12	Megan Gustafson	12	2026 World Cup qualification	2026.03.15	San Juan (PUR)
798	Puerto Rico	91	52	+39	Megan Gustafson	21	2026 World Cup qualification	2026.03.14	San Juan (PUR)
797	Senegal	84	51	+33	Iyana Martín	16	2026 World Cup qualification	2026.03.12	San Juan (PUR)
796	New Zealand	99	50	+49	Megan Gustafson	20	2026 World Cup qualification	2026.03.11	San Juan (PUR)
795	France	68	72	-4	Iyana Martín	16	2025 Friendly	2025.11.16	La Línea de la Concepción
794	Italy	61	77	-16	Iyana Martín	11	2025 Friendly	2025.11.14	La Línea de la Concepción
793	Belgium	65	67	-2	Ayuso, Ginzo, Pueyo	11	2025 EuroBasket F	2025.06.29	Piraeus (GRE)
792	France	65	64	+1	Awa Fam	21	2025 EuroBasket SF	2025.06.27	Piraeus (GRE)
791	Czech Republic	88	81	+7	Raquel Carrera	31	2025 EuroBasket QF	2025.06.25	Piraeus (GRE)
790	Sweden	78	75	+3	Alba Torrens	20	2025 EuroBasket 1R	2025.06.22	Hamburg (GER)
789	Germany	79	60	+19	Raquel Carrera	20	2025 EuroBasket 1R	2025.06.20	Hamburg (GER)
788	Great Britain	85	70	+15	Iyana Martín	14	2025 EuroBasket 1R	2025.06.19	Hamburg (GER)
787	Switzerland	94	64	+30	Paula Ginzo	24	2025 Friendly	2025.06.11	Viana (POR)
786	Portugal	68	59	+9	Aina Ayuso	11	2025 Friendly	2025.06.10	Viana (POR)
785	Italy	57	42	+15	Irati Etxarri	9	2025 Friendly	2025.06.01	Inca
784	Greece	64	40	+24	Awa Fam Thiam	11	2025 Friendly	2025.05.30	Inca
783	Netherlands	81	64	+17	Megan Gustafson	27	2025 EuroBasket qualification	2025.02.09	Almere (NED)
782	Austria	76	45	+31	Megan Gustafson	18	2025 EuroBasket qualification	2025.02.06	Vienna (AUT)
781	Croatia	78	62	+16	Paula Ginzo	15	2025 EuroBasket qualification	2024.11.10	Castellón
780	Netherlands	66	59	+7	María Conde	17	2025 EuroBasket qualification	2024.11.07	Castellón
779	Belgium	66	79	-13	Megan Gustafson	21	2024 Olympics QF	2024.08.07	Paris (FRA)
778	Serbia	70	62	+8	María Conde	15	2024 Olympics 1R	2024.08.03	Lille (FRA)
777	Puerto Rico	63	62	+1	Megan Gustafson	18	2024 Olympics 1R	2024.07.31	Lille (FRA)
776	China	90	89	+1	Megan Gustafson	29	2024 Olympics 1R	2024.07.28	Lille (FRA)
775	Canada	68	48	+20	Queralt Casas	20	2024 Friendly	2024.07.24	Segovia
774	Australia	66	75	-9	Leonor Rodríguez	11	2024 Friendly	2024.07.22	Segovia
773	Canada	61	48	+13	Alba Torrens	11	2024 Friendly	2024.07.13	Charleroi (BEL)
772	Belgium	58	76	-18	María Conde	14	2024 Friendly	2024.07.12	Charleroi (BEL)
771	China	70	46	+24	María Conde	14	2024 Friendly	2024.06.23	Vigo
770	Turkey	59	47	+12	María Conde	11	2024 Friendly	2024.06.21	Vigo
769	Hungary	73	72	+1	María Conde	16	2024 Olympics qualification	2024.02.11	Sopron (HUN)
768	Canada	60	55	+5	Megan Gustafson	16	2024 Olympics qualification	2024.02.09	Sopron (HUN)
767	Japan	75	86	-11	Raquel Carrera	19	2024 Olympics qualification	2024.02.08	Sopron (HUN)
766	Austria	75	34	+41	Paula Ginzo	16	2025 EuroBasket qualification	2023.11.12	Tenerife
765	Croatia	70	65	+5	María Conde	12	2025 EuroBasket qualification	2023.11.09	Split (CRO)
764	Belgium	58	64	-6	Queralt Casas	14	2023 EuroBasket F	2023.06.25	Ljubljana (SLO)
763	Hungary	69	60	+9	Alba Torrens	27	2023 EuroBasket SF	2023.06.24	Ljubljana (SLO)
762	Germany	67	42	+25	Laura Gil	13	2023 EuroBasket QF	2023.06.22	Ljubljana (SLO)
761	Greece	76	60	+16	Queralt Casas	16	2023 EuroBasket 1R	2023.06.18	Tel-Aviv (ISR)
760	Montenegro	78	57	+21	María Conde	20	2023 EuroBasket 1R	2023.06.16	Tel-Aviv (ISR)
759	Latvia	63	67	-4	Laura Gil	20	2023 EuroBasket 1R	2023.06.15	Tel-Aviv (ISR)
758	Hungary	65	77	-12	Leonor Rodríguez	16	2023 Friendly	2023.06.10	Sopron (HUN)
757	Hungary	65	63	+2	Alba Torrens	23	2023 Friendly	2023.06.09	Sopron (HUN)
756	Belgium	72	54	+18	Raquel Carrera	14	2023 Friendly	2023.06.04	Córdoba
755	Turkey	76	37	+39	María Conde	12	2023 Friendly	2023.06.02	Córdoba
754	China	76	60	+16	Raquel Carrera	21	2023 Friendly	2023.05.26	Vigo
753	Italy	55	44	+11	Paula Ginzo, Raquel Carrera	10	2023 Friendly	2023.05.25	Vigo
752	Iceland	88	34	+54	Paula Ginzo	13	2023 EuroBasket qualification	2023.02.12	Reykjavík (ISL)
751	Romania	75	32	+43	Ángela Salvadores	14	2023 EuroBasket qualification	2023.02.09	Sfântu Gheorghe (ROM)
750	Hungary	77	66	+11	Astou Ndour	21	2023 EuroBasket qualification	2022.11.27	Huelva
749	Iceland	120	54	+66	María Araújo	19	2023 EuroBasket qualification	2022.11.24	Huelva
748	Italy	54	46	+8	María Conde	16	2022 Friendly	2022.06.19	Cividale del Friuli (ITA)
747	Slovenia	60	56	+4	María Conde	17	2022 Friendly	2022.06.18	Cividale del Friuli (ITA)
746	Belgium	79	70	+9	Astou Ndour	24	2022 Friendly	2022.06.03	Melilla
745	Italy	60	49	+11	María Conde	12	2022 Friendly	2022.06.01	Melilla
744	Romania	107	52	+55	Irati Etxarri, María Conde	21	2023 EuroBasket qualification	2021.11.14	Almería
743	Hungary	66	62	+4	Alba Torrens	19	2023 EuroBasket qualification	2021.11.11	Szekszárd (HUN)
742	France	64	67	-3	Astou Ndour	16	2020 Olympics QF	2021.08.04	Saitama (JPN)
741	Canada	76	66	+10	Astou Ndour	20	2020 Olympics 1R	2021.08.01	Saitama (JPN)
740	Serbia	85	70	+15	Astou Ndour	20	2020 Olympics 1R	2021.07.29	Saitama (JPN)
739	South Korea	73	69	+4	Astou Ndour	28	2020 Olympics 1R	2021.07.26	Saitama (JPN)
738	France	75	80	-5	Alba Torrens	22	2021 Friendly	2021.07.10	Paris (FRA)
737	France	72	61	+11	Alba Torrens	19	2021 Friendly	2021.07.08	Málaga
736	Russia	74	78	-4	Maite Cazorla	19	2021 EuroBasket CR	2021.06.26	Valencia
735	Serbia	64	71	-7	Cristina Ouviña	14	2021 EuroBasket QF	2021.06.23	Valencia
734	Montenegro	78	51	+27	María Conde	19	2021 EuroBasket CR	2021.06.21	Valencia
733	Slovakia	93	61	+32	Cristina Ouviña	17	2021 EuroBasket 1R	2021.06.20	Valencia
732	Sweden	76	55	+21	Astou Ndour	22	2021 EuroBasket 1R	2021.06.18	Valencia
731	Belarus	51	53	-2	Astou Ndour	15	2021 EuroBasket 1R	2021.06.17	Valencia
730	Turkey	75	41	+34	Laura Gil	14	2021 Friendly	2021.06.10	Valencia
729	Belgium	61	58	+3	Alba Torrens	27	2021 Friendly	2021.06.05	Córdoba
728	Nigeria	61	52	+9	Alba Torrens	18	2021 Friendly	2021.06.03	Córdoba
727	France	45	72	-27	Raquel Carrera	12	2021 Friendly	2021.05.24	Toulouse (FRA)
726	France	57	66	-9	Alba Torrens	16	2021 Friendly	2021.05.23	Toulouse (FRA)
725	Great Britain	79	69	+10	María Conde	15	2020 Olympics qualification	2020.02.09	Belgrade (SRB)
724	China	62	64	-2	Alba Torrens	17	2020 Olympics qualification	2020.02.08	Belgrade (SRB)
723	South Korea	83	46	+37	Leonor Rodríguez	14	2020 Olympics qualification	2020.02.06	Belgrade (SRB)
722	France	58	65	-7	Leonor Rodríguez, Cristina Ouviña	12	2019 Friendly	2019.11.17	Palencia
721	France	51	55	-4	Leonor Rodríguez	11	2019 Friendly	2019.11.15	Zamora
720	France	86	66	+20	Marta Xargay	23	2019 EuroBasket F	2019.07.07	Belgrade (SRB)
719	Serbia	71	66	+5	Astou Ndour	17	2019 EuroBasket SF	2019.07.06	Belgrade (SRB)
718	Russia	78	54	+24	Astou Ndour	24	2019 EuroBasket QF	2019.07.04	Belgrade (SRB)
717	Latvia	59	56	+3	Astou Ndour	16	2019 EuroBasket 1R	2019.06.30	Riga (LAT)
716	Great Britain	67	59	+8	Astou Ndour	23	2019 EuroBasket 1R	2019.06.28	Riga (LAT)
715	Ukraine	95	77	+18	Marta Xargay	31	2019 EuroBasket 1R	2019.06.27	Riga (LAT)
714	Great Britain	67	65	+2	Marta Xargay	15	2019 Friendly	2019.06.23	Fuenlabrada
713	Sweden	62	29	+33	Astou Ndour	22	2019 Friendly	2019.06.21	Fuenlabrada
712	Canada	87	59	+28	Marta Xargay	18	2019 Friendly	2019.06.16	Wevelgem (BEL)
711	China	69	46	+23	Silvia Domínguez	14	2019 Friendly	2019.06.15	Wevelgem (BEL)
710	Belgium	61	65	-4	Tamara Abalde	11	2019 Friendly	2019.06.14	Wevelgem (BEL)
709	Belgium	73	61	+12	Andrea Vilaró	14	2019 Friendly	2019.06.09	Zaragoza
708	Russia	61	70	-9	Marta Xargay	12	2019 Friendly	2019.06.08	Zaragoza
707	Turkey	58	55	+3	Marta Xargay	16	2019 Friendly	2019.06.02	Burgos
706	Latvia	77	51	+26	Laura Gil, Andrea Vilaró, Marta Xargay	12	2019 Friendly	2019.06.01	Burgos
705	Ukraine	84	71	+13	Marta Xargay	23	2019 EuroBasket qualification	2018.11.21	Melilla
704	Netherlands	65	48	+17	Cristina Ouviña	12	2019 EuroBasket qualification	2018.11.17	Amsterdam (NED)
703	Belgium	67	60	+7	Marta Xargay	17	2018 World Cup 3P	2018.09.30	Tenerife
702	Australia	66	72	-6	Astou Ndour	17	2018 World Cup SF	2018.09.29	Tenerife
701	Canada	68	53	+15	Astou Ndour	16	2018 World Cup QF	2018.09.28	Tenerife
700	Senegal	63	48	+15	Astou Ndour	14	2018 World Cup CR	2018.09.26	Tenerife
699	Belgium	63	72	-9	Alba Torrens	16	2018 World Cup 1R	2018.09.25	Tenerife
698	Puerto Rico	78	53	+25	Astou Ndour	22	2018 World Cup 1R	2018.09.23	Tenerife
697	Japan	84	71	+13	Marta Xargay	15	2018 World Cup 1R	2018.09.22	Tenerife
696	Australia	65	62	+3	Alba Torrens	12	2018 Friendly	2018.09.16	Tenerife
695	Japan	94	90	+4	Marta Xargay	21	2018 Friendly	2018.09.15	Tenerife
694	Greece	82	56	+26	María Conde	14	2018 Friendly	2018.09.09	Cáceres
693	Argentina	66	33	+33	Marta Xargay	17	2018 Friendly	2018.09.08	Cáceres
692	France	65	54	+11	Marta Xargay	21	2018 Friendly	2018.09.01	Valencia
691	Belgium	58	46	+12	Belén Arrojo	14	2018 Friendly	2018.08.31	Valencia
690	Japan	84	83	+1	Alba Torrens	25	2018 Friendly	2018.07.06	Palma de Mallorca
689	Japan	87	81	+6	Marta Xargay	23	2018 Friendly	2018.07.05	Palma de Mallorca
688	Bulgaria	97	57	+40	Queralt Casas, Marta Xargay	14	2019 EuroBasket qualification	2018.02.14	Guadalajara
687	Ukraine	72	68	+4	Alba Torrens	18	2019 EuroBasket qualification	2018.02.10	Kiev (UKR)
686	Netherlands	92	26	+66	Marta Xargay	22	2019 EuroBasket qualification	2017.11.15	Valladolid
685	Bulgaria	92	42	+50	Laura Nicholls	14	2019 EuroBasket qualification	2017.11.11	Sofia (BUL)
684	France	72	55	+17	Sancho Lyttle	19	2017 EuroBasket F	2017.06.25	Prague (CZE)
683	Belgium	68	52	+16	Alba Torrens	20	2017 EuroBasket SF	2017.06.24	Prague (CZE)
682	Latvia	67	47	+20	Alba Torrens	20	2017 EuroBasket QF	2017.06.22	Prague (CZE)
681	Czech Republic	63	67	-4	Sancho Lyttle	17	2017 EuroBasket 1R	2017.06.19	Hradec Králové (CZE)
680	Ukraine	76	54	+22	Alba Torrens	26	2017 EuroBasket 1R	2017.06.17	Hradec Králové (CZE)
679	Hungary	62	48	+14	Sancho Lyttle	17	2017 EuroBasket 1R	2017.06.16	Hradec Králové (CZE)
678	France	56	65	-9	Alba Torrens, Anna Cruz	10	2017 Friendly	2017.06.11	Mulhouse (FRA)
677	Italy	66	62	+4	Alba Torrens	19	2017 Friendly	2017.06.10	Mulhouse (FRA)
676	Belgium	87	48	+39	Marta Xargay	19	2017 Friendly	2017.06.03	Kortrijk (BEL)
675	Belgium	69	59	+10	Alba Torrens	19	2017 Friendly	2017.06.02	Kortrijk (BEL)
674	Japan	67	51	+16	Marta Xargay	15	2017 Friendly	2017.05.28	Torrelavega
673	Canada	64	42	+22	Marta Xargay	15	2017 Friendly	2017.05.26	Torrelavega
672	China	68	58	+10	Alba Torrens	32	2017 Friendly	2017.05.21	San Fernando
671	Poland	69	47	+22	Marta Xargay	14	2017 Friendly	2017.05.19	San Fernando
670	Finland	72	54	+18	Leonor Rodríguez	12	2017 EuroBasket qualification	2016.11.19	Helsinki (FIN)
669	United States	72	101	-29	Alba Torrens	18	2016 Olympics F	2016.08.20	Rio (BRA)
668	Serbia	68	54	+14	Astou Ndour, Alba Torrens	14	2016 Olympics SF	2016.08.18	Rio (BRA)
667	Turkey	64	62	+2	Anna Cruz	14	2016 Olympics QF	2016.08.16	Rio (BRA)
666	Canada	73	60	+13	Alba Torrens	20	2016 Olympics 1R	2016.08.14	Rio (BRA)
665	Senegal	97	43	+54	Alba Torrens	14	2016 Olympics 1R	2016.08.12	Rio (BRA)
664	China	89	68	+21	Alba Torrens	32	2016 Olympics 1R	2016.08.10	Rio (BRA)
663	United States	63	103	-40	Alba Torrens	20	2016 Olympics 1R	2016.08.08	Rio (BRA)
662	Serbia	65	59	+6	Marta Xargay	15	2016 Olympics 1R	2016.08.07	Rio (BRA)
661	Turkey	66	71	-5	Astou Ndour	18	2016 Friendly	2016.08.02	Rio (BRA)
660	South Korea	70	50	+20	Sancho Lyttle	20	2016 Olympics qualification	2016.06.17	Nantes (FRA)
659	Venezuela	83	55	+28	Leonor Rodríguez	24	2016 Olympics qualification	2016.06.15	Nantes (FRA)
658	China	77	43	+34	Alba Torrens	22	2016 Olympics qualification	2016.06.14	Nantes (FRA)
657	New Zealand	80	60	+20	Alba Torrens	24	2016 Friendly	2016.06.09	Oviedo
656	New Zealand	52	54	-2	Marta Xargay	12	2016 Friendly	2016.06.08	Gijón
655	Cuba	83	40	+43	Marta Xargay	19	2016 Friendly	2016.06.06	Palencia
654	Canada	77	54	+23	Marta Xargay	17	2016 Friendly	2016.06.04	Palencia
653	Argentina	73	47	+26	Alba Torrens	16	2016 Friendly	2016.05.31	San Fernando
652	Australia	58	55	+3	Alba Torrens	14	2016 Friendly	2016.05.30	San Fernando
651	Sweden	93	45	+48	Sancho Lyttle, Alba Torrens	17	2017 EuroBasket qualification	2016.02.24	Logroño
650	Finland	86	45	+41	Sancho Lyttle	18	2017 EuroBasket qualification	2015.11.25	Zamora
649	Sweden	75	52	+23	Sancho Lyttle	24	2017 EuroBasket qualification	2015.11.21	Sodertajle (SWE)
648	Belarus	74	58	+16	Alba Torrens	25	2015 EuroBasket 3P	2015.06.28	Budapest (HUN)
647	France	58	63	-5	Alba Torrens	13	2015 EuroBasket SF	2015.06.26	Budapest (HUN)
646	Montenegro	75	74	+1	Alba Torrens	28	2015 EuroBasket QF	2015.06.25	Budapest (HUN)
645	Russia	66	57	+9	Alba Torrens	24	2015 EuroBasket 2R	2015.06.22	Győr (HUN)
644	Serbia	91	80	+11	Alba Torrens	25	2015 EuroBasket 2R	2015.06.20	Győr (HUN)
643	Croatia	95	52	+43	Alba Torrens, Marta Xargay	16	2015 EuroBasket 2R	2015.06.18	Győr (HUN)
642	Sweden	64	60	+4	Anna Cruz	13	2015 EuroBasket 1R	2015.06.15	Sopron (HUN)
641	Hungary	69	46	+23	Alba Torrens	18	2015 EuroBasket 1R	2015.06.14	Sopron (HUN)
640	Slovakia	82	81	+1	Alba Torrens	20	2015 EuroBasket 1R	2015.06.13	Sopron (HUN)
639	Lithuania	72	58	+14	Astou Ndour	22	2015 EuroBasket 1R	2015.06.11	Sopron (HUN)
638	Venezuela	103	45	+58	Leticia Romero	23	2015 Friendly	2015.06.06	Huelva
637	Australia	80	51	+29	Astou Ndour	14	2015 Friendly	2015.06.05	Huelva
636	Canada	68	57	+11	Astou Ndour	17	2015 Friendly	2015.05.30	Logroño
635	Poland	60	35	+25	Alba Torrens	13	2015 Friendly	2015.05.29	Logroño
634	Great Britain	70	41	+29	Alba Torrens	18	2015 Friendly	2015.05.28	Logroño
633	Russia	61	49	+12	Astou Ndour	18	2015 Friendly	2015.05.23	Santander
632	Turkey	73	67	+6	Alba Torrens, Astou Ndour	17	2015 Friendly	2015.05.22	Santander
631	Greece	79	39	+40	Alba Torrens	17	2015 Friendly	2015.05.21	Santander
630	United States	64	77	-13	Sancho Lyttle	16	2014 World Cup F	2014.10.05	Istanbul (TUR)
629	Turkey	66	56	+10	Alba Torrens	28	2014 World Cup SF	2014.10.04	Istanbul (TUR)
628	China	71	55	+16	Sancho Lyttle	24	2014 World Cup QF	2014.10.03	Istanbul (TUR)
627	Czech Republic	67	43	+24	Sancho Lyttle	17	2014 World Cup 1R	2014.09.29	Ankara (TUR)
626	Brazil	83	56	+27	Sancho Lyttle	15	2014 World Cup 1R	2014.09.28	Ankara (TUR)
625	Japan	74	50	+24	Sancho Lyttle	19	2014 World Cup 1R	2014.09.27	Ankara (TUR)
624	Cuba	73	46	+27	Alba Torrens	15	2014 Friendly	2014.09.21	Logroño
623	Canada	66	46	+20	Alba Torrens, Marta Xargay	13	2014 Friendly	2014.09.20	Logroño
622	China	58	55	+3	Astou Ndour	20	2014 Friendly	2014.09.16	Minsk (BLR)
621	Belarus	82	81	+1	Alba Torrens	26	2014 Friendly	2014.09.15	Minsk (BLR)
620	Turkey	55	51	+4	Marta Xargay	13	2014 Friendly	2014.09.14	Minsk (BLR)
619	Angola	90	40	+50	Nuria Martínez	16	2014 Friendly	2014.09.06	Murcia
618	Japan	68	55	+13	Astou Ndour	20	2014 Friendly	2014.09.05	Murcia
617	Serbia	79	66	+13	Marta Xargay	13	2014 Friendly	2014.09.04	Murcia
616	France	70	69	+1	Alba Torrens	21	2013 EuroBasket F	2013.06.30	Orchies (FRA)
615	Serbia	88	69	+19	Sancho Lyttle	22	2013 EuroBasket SF	2013.06.28	Orchies (FRA)
614	Czech Republic	75	58	+17	Alba Torrens	29	2013 EuroBasket QF	2013.06.26	Orchies (FRA)
613	Turkey	61	48	+13	Sancho Lyttle	18	2013 EuroBasket 2R	2013.06.24	Lille (FRA)
612	Montenegro	66	50	+16	Sancho Lyttle	21	2013 EuroBasket 2R	2013.06.22	Lille (FRA)
611	Slovakia	80	44	+36	Sancho Lyttle	18	2013 EuroBasket 2R	2013.06.20	Lille (FRA)
610	Sweden	73	49	+24	Sancho Lyttle	17	2013 EuroBasket 1R	2013.06.17	Vannes (FRA)
609	Italy	71	59	+12	Sancho Lyttle	19	2013 EuroBasket 1R	2013.06.16	Vannes (FRA)
608	Russia	77	72	+5	Alba Torrens	30	2013 EuroBasket 1R	2013.06.15	Vannes (FRA)
607	France	56	67	-11	Alba Torrens	21	2013 Friendly	2013.06.09	Évry (FRA)
606	Canada	61	55	+6	Elisa Aguilar	17	2013 Friendly	2013.06.08	Évry (FRA)
605	Turkey	53	39	+14	Alba Torrens	14	2013 Friendly	2013.06.07	Évry (FRA)
604	Turkey	63	53	+10	Queralt Casas	15	2013 Friendly	2013.06.01	Benahavís
603	Croatia	76	55	+21	Alba Torrens	15	2013 Friendly	2013.05.31	Benahavís
602	Netherlands	67	41	+26	Laura Gil	15	2013 Friendly	2013.05.30	Benahavís
601	Finland	58	38	+20	Alba Torrens	20	2013 Friendly	2013.05.24	Molina de Segura
600	Finland	92	28	+64	Alba Torrens	20	2013 Friendly	2013.05.23	Águilas
599	Romania	68	54	+14	Cristina Ouviña	11	2013 EuroBasket qualification	2012.07.11	Arganda del Rey
598	Germany	61	55	+6	Amaya Valdemoro	18	2013 EuroBasket qualification	2012.07.07	Nordlingen (GER)
597	Sweden	73	79	-6	Amaya Valdemoro	19	2013 EuroBasket qualification	2012.07.04	Alcobendas
596	Bulgaria	79	51	+28	Anna Cruz	16	2013 EuroBasket qualification	2012.06.30	Sofia (BUL)
595	Romania	68	51	+17	Anna Cruz	15	2013 EuroBasket qualification	2012.06.23	Bucarest (ROU)
594	Germany	66	39	+27	Elisa Aguilar	12	2013 EuroBasket qualification	2012.06.20	Avila
593	Sweden	69	70	-1	Amaya Valdemoro	13	2013 EuroBasket qualification	2012.06.16	Sodertajle (SWE)
592	Bulgaria	64	48	+16	Elisa Aguilar, Cristina Ouviña	10	2013 EuroBasket qualification	2012.06.13	Murcia
591	Lithuania	85	80	+5	Marta Fernández	21	2012 Friendly	2012.06.08	Kaunas (LTU)
590	Latvia	68	63	+5	Marta Fernández	13	2012 Friendly	2012.06.07	Kaunas (LTU)
589	Sweden	80	71	+9	Ana Montañana	15	2012 Friendly	2012.06.06	Kaunas (LTU)
588	Croatia	71	75	-4	Laia Palau	19	2011 EuroBasket 2R	2011.06.26	Katowice (POL)
587	Latvia	66	57	+9	Sancho Lyttle, Ana Montañana	16	2011 EuroBasket 2R	2011.06.24	Katowice (POL)
586	France	55	79	-24	Sancho Lyttle, Ana Montañana	11	2011 EuroBasket 2R	2011.06.22	Katowice (POL)
585	Poland	78	63	+15	Sancho Lyttle	18	2011 EuroBasket 1R	2011.06.20	Katowice (POL)
584	Montenegro	57	66	-9	Alba Torrens	25	2011 EuroBasket 1R	2011.06.19	Katowice (POL)
583	Germany	79	69	+10	Alba Torrens	18	2011 EuroBasket 1R	2011.06.18	Katowice (POL)
582	Turkey	58	55	+3	Anna Cruz	18	2011 Friendly	2011.06.11	Istanbul (TUR)
581	Montenegro	76	63	+13	Ana Montañana	22	2011 Friendly	2011.06.10	Istanbul (TUR)
580	Greece	71	57	+14	Alba Torrens	15	2011 Friendly	2011.06.09	Istanbul (TUR)
579	Belarus	57	52	+5	Amaya Valdemoro, Alba Torrens	11	2011 Friendly	2011.06.04	Linares
578	Turkey	68	53	+15	Ana Montañana	15	2011 Friendly	2011.06.03	Linares
577	Croatia	80	63	+17	Anna Cruz	14	2011 Friendly	2011.06.02	Linares
576	Canada	66	59	+7	Lucila Pascua	20	2011 Friendly	2011.05.29	Segovia
575	Cuba	61	50	+11	Ana Montañana	12	2011 Friendly	2011.05.27	Segovia
574	Japan	74	54	+20	Alba Torrens	16	2011 Friendly	2011.05.25	Ávila
573	Belarus	77	68	+9	Sancho Lyttle	22	2010 World Cup 3P	2010.10.03	Karlovy Vary (CZE)
572	United States	70	106	-36	Marta Fernández	16	2010 World Cup SF	2010.10.02	Karlovy Vary (CZE)
571	France	74	71	+3	Amaya Valdemoro	28	2010 World Cup QF	2010.10.01	Karlovy Vary (CZE)
570	Russia	67	76	-9	Amaya Valdemoro	21	2010 World Cup 2R	2010.09.29	Brno (CZE)
569	Czech Republic	77	57	+20	Amaya Valdemoro	25	2010 World Cup 2R	2010.09.28	Brno (CZE)
568	Japan	86	59	+27	Sancho Lyttle	29	2010 World Cup 2R	2010.09.27	Brno (CZE)
567	Brazil	69	57	+12	Amaya Valdemoro	17	2010 World Cup 1R	2010.09.25	Brno (CZE)
566	South Korea	84	69	+15	Sancho Lyttle	28	2010 World Cup 1R	2010.09.24	Brno (CZE)
565	Mali	80	36	+44	Amaya Valdemoro	18	2010 World Cup 1R	2010.09.23	Brno (CZE)
564	Australia	64	85	-21	Ana Montañana	12	2010 Friendly	2010.09.18	Salamanca
563	Senegal	77	46	+31	Alba Torrens	17	2010 Friendly	2010.09.17	Salamanca
562	United States	69	85	-16	Ana Montañana	21	2010 Friendly	2010.09.12	Hartford (USA)
561	Australia	87	74	+13	Amaya Valdemoro	22	2010 Friendly	2010.09.11	Hartford (USA)
560	France	59	65	-6	Amaya Valdemoro	17	2010 Friendly	2010.09.04	Lugo
559	Belarus	68	65	+3	Ana Montañana	14	2010 Friendly	2010.09.03	Lugo
558	Greece	80	39	+41	Amaya Valdemoro	14	2010 Friendly	2010.09.02	Lugo
557	Mali	99	36	+63	Alba Torrens	15	2010 Friendly	2010.08.28	Alcobendas
556	Mali	88	44	+44	Lucila Pascua	21	2010 Friendly	2010.08.27	Alcobendas
555	Belarus	63	56	+7	Ana Montañana	16	2009 EuroBasket 3P	2009.06.20	Riga (LAT)
554	Russia	61	77	-16	Alba Torrens	17	2009 EuroBasket SF	2009.06.19	Riga (LAT)
553	Italy	61	42	+19	Ana Montañana	10	2009 EuroBasket QF	2009.06.17	Riga (LAT)
552	Latvia	67	60	+7	Ana Montañana	25	2009 EuroBasket 2R	2009.06.15	Riga (LAT)
551	Poland	67	55	+12	Ana Montañana	16	2009 EuroBasket 2R	2009.06.13	Riga (LAT)
550	Greece	67	48	+19	Ana Montañana	19	2009 EuroBasket 2R	2009.06.11	Riga (LAT)
549	Slovakia	71	54	+17	Ana Montañana	24	2009 EuroBasket 1R	2009.06.09	Liepaja (LAT)
548	Ukraine	85	59	+26	Silvia Domínguez	11	2009 EuroBasket 1R	2009.06.08	Liepaja (LAT)
547	Czech Republic	66	59	+7	Ana Montañana	16	2009 EuroBasket 1R	2009.06.07	Liepaja (LAT)
546	Russia	71	75	-4	Alba Torrens	13	2009 Friendly	2009.06.02	Kaunas (LTU)
545	Lithuania	77	87	-10	Alba Torrens	23	2009 Friendly	2009.06.01	Kaunas (LTU)
544	Cuba	65	57	+8	Alba Torrens	20	2009 Friendly	2009.05.30	Vigo
543	Turkey	71	76	-5	Laura Nicholls	14	2009 Friendly	2009.05.24	Istanbul (TUR)
542	Poland	68	64	+4	Alba Torrens	15	2009 Friendly	2009.05.23	Istanbul (TUR)
541	Belarus	58	59	-1	Isabel Sánchez	14	2009 Friendly	2009.05.22	Istanbul (TUR)
540	Cuba	81	70	+11	Isabel Sánchez, Lucila Pascua, Ana Montañana	12	2009 Friendly	2009.05.17	Santiago Compostela
539	Cuba	67	53	+14	Amaya Valdemoro	13	2009 Friendly	2009.05.16	Santiago Compostela
538	Russia	65	84	-19	Amaya Valdemoro	16	2008 Olympics QF	2008.08.19	Beijing (CHN)
537	Mali	79	47	+32	Amaya Valdemoro	21	2008 Olympics 1R	2008.08.17	Beijing (CHN)
536	United States	55	93	-38	Amaya Valdemoro	17	2008 Olympics 1R	2008.08.15	Beijing (CHN)
535	Czech Republic	74	55	+19	Ana Montañana	20	2008 Olympics 1R	2008.08.13	Beijing (CHN)
534	New Zealand	85	62	+23	Isabel Sánchez	19	2008 Olympics 1R	2008.08.11	Beijing (CHN)
533	China	64	67	-3	Alba Torrens	18	2008 Olympics 1R	2008.08.09	Beijing (CHN)
532	Russia	90	73	+17	Alba Torrens	18	2008 Friendly	2008.07.24	Moscow (RUS)
531	Israel	58	69	-11	Ana Montañana	25	2008 Friendly	2008.07.23	Moscow (RUS)
530	Czech Republic	66	63	+3	Ana Montañana	15	2008 Friendly	2008.07.22	Moscow (RUS)
529	Mali	66	55	+11	Laia Palau	13	2008 Friendly	2008.07.19	San Fernando
528	Cuba	82	68	+14	Elisa Aguilar	28	2008 Olympics qualification	2008.06.13	Madrid
527	Brazil	68	71	-3	Ana Montañana	20	2008 Olympics qualification	2008.06.11	Madrid
526	Fiji	113	42	+71	Amaya Valdemoro	24	2008 Olympics qualification	2008.06.09	Madrid
525	China	64	60	+4	Amaya Valdemoro	25	2008 Friendly	2008.06.04	Alcobendas
524	Argentina	92	43	+49	Amaya Valdemoro	20	2008 Friendly	2008.06.03	Alcobendas
523	Japan	89	60	+29	Amaya Valdemoro	19	2008 Friendly	2008.06.01	Paterna
522	New Zealand	77	58	+19	Ana Montañana	17	2008 Friendly	2008.05.30	Paterna
521	Angola	71	39	+32	Isabel Sánchez	12	2008 Friendly	2008.05.25	Palencia
520	Czech Republic	70	51	+19	Cindy Lima, Alba Torrens	12	2008 Friendly	2008.05.23	Palencia
519	Czech Republic	75	57	+18	Ana Montañana	20	2008 Friendly	2008.05.22	Segovia
518	Russia	68	74	-6	Amaya Valdemoro	26	2007 EuroBasket F	2007.10.07	Chieti (ITA)
517	Belarus	70	54	+16	Ana Montañana	14	2007 EuroBasket SF	2007.10.06	Chieti (ITA)
516	Belgium	72	53	+19	Amaya Valdemoro	19	2007 EuroBasket QF	2007.10.05	Chieti (ITA)
515	Russia	49	64	-15	Amaya Valdemoro	14	2007 EuroBasket 2R	2007.10.03	Ortona (ITA)
514	France	63	53	+10	Amaya Valdemoro	17	2007 EuroBasket 2R	2007.10.01	Ortona (ITA)
513	Italy	79	64	+15	Elisa Aguilar	17	2007 EuroBasket 2R	2007.09.29	Ortona (ITA)
512	Croatia	63	52	+11	Amaya Valdemoro	15	2007 EuroBasket 1R	2007.09.26	Ortona (ITA)
511	Serbia	79	76	+3	Elisa Aguilar	22	2007 EuroBasket 1R	2007.09.25	Ortona (ITA)
510	Belarus	76	62	+14	Amaya Valdemoro	17	2007 EuroBasket 1R	2007.09.24	Ortona (ITA)
509	China	83	59	+24			2007 Friendly	2007.09.19	Pinto
508	China	58	62	-4			2007 Friendly	2007.09.18	Pinto
507	Latvia	73	66	+7			2007 Friendly	2007.09.16	Namur (BEL)
506	Belgium	82	67	+15			2007 Friendly	2007.09.14	Namur (BEL)
505	Latvia	69	62	+7			2007 Friendly	2007.09.02	Riga (LAT)
504	France	73	67	+6			2007 Friendly	2007.09.01	Riga (LAT)
503	China	76	83	-7			2007 Friendly	2007.08.31	Riga (LAT)
502	Czech Republic	49	57	-8	Amaya Valdemoro	20	2006 World Cup CR	2006.09.22	São Paulo (BRA)
501	Lithuania	71	80	-9	Amaya Valdemoro	28	2006 World Cup CR	2006.09.21	São Paulo (BRA)
500	Russia	56	60	-4	Amaya Valdemoro	21	2006 World Cup QF	2006.09.20	São Paulo (BRA)
499	Lithuania	75	55	+20	Amaya Valdemoro	39	2006 World Cup 2R	2006.09.18	São Paulo (BRA)
498	Canada	85	57	+28	Amaya Valdemoro	28	2006 World Cup 2R	2006.09.17	São Paulo (BRA)
497	Australia	68	72	-4	Amaya Valdemoro	19	2006 World Cup 2R	2006.09.16	São Paulo (BRA)
496	Brazil	67	66	+1	Amaya Valdemoro	19	2006 World Cup 1R	2006.09.14	São Paulo (BRA)
495	Argentina	64	77	-13	Laia Palau	20	2006 World Cup 1R	2006.09.13	São Paulo (BRA)
494	South Korea	87	57	+30	Amaya Valdemoro	17	2006 World Cup 1R	2006.09.12	São Paulo (BRA)
493	Brazil	66	84	-18			2006 Friendly	2006.09.09	São Paulo (BRA)
492	Canada	80	61	+19			2006 Friendly	2006.09.08	São Paulo (BRA)
491	China	71	66	+5			2006 Friendly	2006.09.07	São Paulo (BRA)
490	France	66	82	-16			2006 Friendly	2006.08.27	Vannes (FRA)
489	Senegal	74	46	+28			2006 Friendly	2006.08.26	Vannes (FRA)
488	Belgium	83	68	+15			2006 Friendly	2006.08.25	Vannes (FRA)
487	Russia	55	53	+2			2006 Friendly	2006.08.13	Aljaraque
486	China	79	66	+13			2006 Friendly	2006.08.12	Aljaraque
485	Canada	75	57	+18			2006 Friendly	2006.08.11	Aljaraque
484	Lithuania	83	65	+18	Ana Montañana	21	2005 EuroBasket 3P	2005.09.11	Ankara (TUR)
483	Czech Republic	66	76	-10	Amaya Valdemoro	26	2005 EuroBasket SF	2005.09.10	Ankara (TUR)
482	Latvia	69	50	+19	Amaya Valdemoro	17	2005 EuroBasket QF	2005.09.09	Ankara (TUR)
481	Turkey	78	64	+14	Amaya Valdemoro	16	2005 EuroBasket 1R	2005.09.07	Ismir (TUR)
480	Serbia and Montenegro	69	52	+17	Amaya Valdemoro	26	2005 EuroBasket 1R	2005.09.06	Ismir (TUR)
479	Russia	81	77	+4	Amaya Valdemoro	26	2005 EuroBasket 1R	2005.09.04	Ismir (TUR)
478	Romania	98	53	+45	Amaya Valdemoro	20	2005 EuroBasket 1R	2005.09.03	Ismir (TUR)
477	Lithuania	69	74	-5	Amaya Valdemoro	27	2005 EuroBasket 1R	2005.09.02	Ismir (TUR)
476	Greece	63	58	+5			2005 Friendly	2005.08.29	Glyfada (GRE)
475	Romania	77	43	+34			2005 Friendly	2005.08.28	Glyfada (GRE)
474	Serbia and Montenegro	101	53	+48			2005 Friendly	2005.08.17	Rivas
473	Lithuania	89	92	-3			2005 Friendly	2005.08.16	Rivas
472	Belgium	99	84	+15			2005 Friendly	2005.08.05	Namur (BEL)
471	Germany	90	60	+30			2005 Friendly	2005.08.04	Namur (BEL)
470	Canada	87	63	+24			2005 Friendly	2005.08.03	Andenne (BEL)
469	Czech Republic	68	79	-11	Amaya Valdemoro	24	2004 Olympics CR	2004.08.27	Athens (GRE)
468	Brazil	63	67	-4	Marta Fernández	16	2004 Olympics QF	2004.08.25	Athens (GRE)
467	South Korea	64	61	+3	Amaya Valdemoro	11	2004 Olympics 1R	2004.08.22	Athens (GRE)
466	United States	58	71	-13	Amaya Valdemoro	22	2004 Olympics 1R	2004.08.20	Athens (GRE)
465	New Zealand	91	57	+34	Laia Palau	15	2004 Olympics 1R	2004.08.18	Athens (GRE)
464	China	75	67	+8	Amaya Valdemoro	30	2004 Olympics 1R	2004.08.16	Athens (GRE)
463	Czech Republic	80	78	+2	Laia Palau, Amaya Valdemoro	14	2004 Olympics 1R	2004.08.14	Athens (GRE)
462	United States	61	77	-16			2004 Friendly	2004.08.09	Salamanca
461	Poland	87	53	+34			2004 Friendly	2004.08.08	Salamanca
460	Australia	58	65	-7			2004 Friendly	2004.07.30	Valencia
459	Russia	55	53	+2			2004 Friendly	2004.07.29	Valencia
458	Belgium	80	56	+24			2004 Friendly	2004.07.28	Valencia
457	Belgium	84	55	+29			2004 Friendly	2004.07.25	Melilla
456	Belgium	91	51	+40			2004 Friendly	2004.07.23	El Ejido
455	Japan	72	59	+13			2004 Friendly	2004.07.22	El Ejido
454	Turkey	63	51	+12			2004 Friendly	2004.07.21	El Ejido
453	Poland	87	81	+6	Marta Fernández	19	2003 EuroBasket 3P	2003.09.28	Patras (GRE)
452	Russia	71	78	-7	Amaya Valdemoro	18	2003 EuroBasket SF	2003.09.27	Patras (GRE)
451	Serbia and Montenegro	76	64	+12	Amaya Valdemoro	19	2003 EuroBasket QF	2003.09.26	Patras (GRE)
450	Russia	64	61	+3	Amaya Valdemoro	20	2003 EuroBasket 1R	2003.09.24	Amaliada (GRE)
449	Ukraine	76	71	+5	Amaya Valdemoro	21	2003 EuroBasket 1R	2003.09.23	Amaliada (GRE)
448	Hungary	71	59	+12	Amaya Valdemoro	29	2003 EuroBasket 1R	2003.09.21	Amaliada (GRE)
447	Slovakia	71	47	+24	Amaya Valdemoro	15	2003 EuroBasket 1R	2003.09.20	Amaliada (GRE)
446	Belgium	77	62	+15	Amaya Valdemoro	18	2003 EuroBasket 1R	2003.09.19	Amaliada (GRE)
445	Turkey	75	74	+1			2003 Friendly	2003.08.09	Guadalajara
444	Serbia and Montenegro	60	57	+3			2003 Friendly	2003.08.08	Guadalajara
443	Serbia and Montenegro	57	64	-7			2003 Friendly	2003.09.06	Cáceres
442	Brazil	72	67	+5			2003 Friendly	2003.09.05	Cáceres
441	Ukraine	80	57	+23			2003 Friendly	2003.09.04	Cáceres
440	Croatia	75	55	+20			2003 Friendly	2003.08.30	La Línea
439	Czech Republic	68	53	+15			2003 Friendly	2003.08.29	La Línea
438	Ukraine	83	60	+23			2003 Friendly	2003.08.28	La Línea
437	Israel	79	54	+25	Laia Palau	25	2003 EuroBasket qualification	2002.11.27	Tel Aviv (ISR)
436	Romania	71	58	+13	Laia Palau, Ingrid Pons	19	2003 EuroBasket qualification	2002.11.23	Cluj (ROU)
435	Germany	84	59	+25	Laia Palau	25	2003 EuroBasket qualification	2002.11.20	Vigo
434	China	91	72	+19	Rosi Sánchez	32	2002 World Cup CR	2002.09.25	Nanjing (CHN)
433	France	69	59	+10	Rosi Sánchez	17	2002 World Cup CR	2002.09.24	Nanjing (CHN)
432	United States	55	94	-39	Isabel Sánchez	9	2002 World Cup QF	2002.09.23	Nanjing (CHN)
431	FR Yugoslavia	81	67	+14	Amaya Valdemoro	18	2002 World Cup 2R	2002.09.20	Suzhou (CHN)
430	Brazil	78	68	+10	Amaya Valdemoro	33	2002 World Cup 2R	2002.09.19	Suzhou (CHN)
429	China	59	72	-13	Ingrid Pons	17	2002 World Cup 2R	2002.09.18	Suzhou (CHN)
428	Argentina	97	55	+42	Marta Zurro	15	2002 World Cup 1R	2002.09.16	Wunzhong (CHN)
427	Japan	100	63	+37	Marina Ferragut	18	2002 World Cup 1R	2002.09.15	Wunzhong (CHN)
426	Australia	58	73	-15	Begoña García	15	2002 World Cup 1R	2002.09.14	Wunzhong (CHN)
425	FR Yugoslavia	87	79	+8			2002 Friendly	2002.09.06	Pontevedra
424	Argentina	94	63	+31			2002 Friendly	2002.09.04	Pontevedra
423	Lithuania	85	67	+18			2002 Friendly	2002.09.01	León
422	Senegal	104	48	+56			2002 Friendly	2002.08.31	León
421	Poland	93	75	+18			2002 Friendly	2002.08.30	León
420	Lithuania	76	35	+41			2002 Friendly	2002.08.27	Bembibre
419	France	67	51	+16			2002 Friendly	2002.08.18	Vilagarcía de Arousa
418	Cuba	79	67	+12			2002 Friendly	2002.08.17	Vilagarcía de Arousa
417	Canada	79	48	+31			2002 Friendly	2002.08.16	Vilagarcía de Arousa
416	Israel	83	47	+36	Rosi Sánchez	20	2003 EuroBasket qualification	2001.11.28	Madrid
415	Romania	93	46	+47	Marta Fernández	30	2003 EuroBasket qualification	2001.11.25	Salamanca
414	Germany	85	57	+28	Rosi Sánchez	22	2003 EuroBasket qualification	2001.11.21	Nordlingen (GER)
413	Lithuania	89	74	+15	Nieves Anula	28	2001 EuroBasket 3P	2001.09.23	Le Mans (FRA)
412	Russia	59	74	-15	Betty Cebrián	16	2001 EuroBasket SF	2001.09.22	Le Mans (FRA)
411	Hungary	71	60	+11	Marina Ferragut, Betty Cebrián	13	2001 EuroBasket QF	2001.09.21	Le Mans (FRA)
410	France	64	70	-6	Nieves Anula	22	2001 EuroBasket 1R	2001.09.19	Orléans (FRA)
409	FR Yugoslavia	79	80	-1	Ingrid Pons	20	2001 EuroBasket 1R	2001.09.18	Orléans (FRA)
408	Romania	83	61	+22	Marina Ferragut	13	2001 EuroBasket 1R	2001.09.16	Orléans (FRA)
407	Ukraine	93	65	+28	Nieves Anula	16	2001 EuroBasket 1R	2001.09.15	Orléans (FRA)
406	Poland	78	68	+10	Rosi Sánchez	18	2001 EuroBasket 1R	2001.09.14	Orléans (FRA)
405	Japan	100	77	+23			2001 Friendly	2001.09.05	Burriana
404	Japan	87	62	+25			2001 Friendly	2001.09.04	Burriana
403	Australia	59	33	+26			2001 Friendly	2001.08.28	Villarreal
402	Australia	63	53	+10			2001 Friendly	2001.08.25	Castellon
401	Lithuania	81	76	+5			2001 Friendly	2001.08.18	Puerto de la Cruz
400	Finland	83	44	+39			2001 Friendly	2001.08.16	Puerto de la Cruz
399	Lithuania	67	62	+5			2001 Friendly	2001.08.14	Huesca
398	Czech Republic	62	60	+2	Rosi Sánchez	18	2001 EuroBasket qualification	2000.11.29	Logroño
397	Bulgaria	72	57	+15	Betty Cebrián	16	2001 EuroBasket qualification	2000.11.25	Logroño
396	Latvia	82	58	+24	Rosi Sánchez	25	2001 EuroBasket qualification	2000.11.22	Riga (LAT)
395	Russia	58	56	+2			2000 Friendly	2000.05.23	Torrelavega
394	Portugal	79	60	+19			2000 Friendly	2000.05.22	Torrelavega
393	Czech Republic	54	47	+7	Nieves Anula	14	2001 EuroBasket qualification	1999.12.01	Trutnov (CZE)
392	Bulgaria	65	59	+6	Amaya Valdemoro	13	2001 EuroBasket qualification	1999.11.27	Stara-Zagora (BUL)
391	Latvia	79	47	+32	Amaya Valdemoro	23	2001 EuroBasket qualification	1999.11.24	Burgos
390	Lithuania	70	59	+11	Ana Belén Álvaro	18	1998 World Cup CR	1998.06.07	Berlin (GER)
389	Cuba	80	63	+17	Amaya Valdemoro	27	1998 World Cup CR	1998.06.06	Berlin (GER)
388	Australia	54	87	-33	Rosi Sánchez	11	1998 World Cup QF	1998.06.05	Berlin (GER)
387	Lithuania	63	66	-3	Nieves Anula	17	1998 World Cup 2R	1998.06.01	Bremen (GER)
386	United States	68	79	-11	Ana Belén Álvaro	16	1998 World Cup 2R	1998.05.31	Bremen (GER)
385	Japan	97	58	+39	Nieves Anula	23	1998 World Cup 2R	1998.05.30	Bremen (GER)
384	Russia	70	72	-2	Amaya Valdemoro	18	1998 World Cup 1R	1998.05.28	Rotenburg (GER)
383	China	72	55	+17	Ana Belén Álvaro	17	1998 World Cup 1R	1998.05.27	Rotenburg (GER)
382	Argentina	64	45	+19	Nieves Anula	13	1998 World Cup 1R	1998.05.26	Rotenburg (GER)
381	United States	64	74	-10			1998 Friendly	1998.05.23	Fuenlabrada
380	Greece	68	53	+15	Ana Belén Álvaro	14	1999 EuroBasket qualification	1998.05.17	Daruvar (CRO)
379	Moldova	66	47	+19	Marina Ferragut	15	1999 EuroBasket qualification	1998.05.16	Daruvar (CRO)
378	Latvia	69	76	-7	Marina Ferragut	31	1999 EuroBasket qualification	1998.05.15	Daruvar (CRO)
377	Italy	54	61	-7	Rosi Sánchez	13	1999 EuroBasket qualification	1998.05.14	Daruvar (CRO)
376	Croatia	73	64	+9	Amaya Valdemoro	18	1999 EuroBasket qualification	1998.05.13	Daruvar (CRO)
375	Germany	71	67	+4			1998 Friendly	1998.05.03	Logroño
374	Canada	77	71	+6			1998 Friendly	1998.05.02	Logroño
373	Poland	71	61	+10			1998 Friendly	1998.05.01	Autol
372	France	64	63	+1			1998 Friendly	1998.04.26	Cádiz
371	France	66	61	+5			1998 Friendly	1998.04.25	San Fernando
370	Russia	82	77	+5	Ana Belén Álvaro	18	1997 EuroBasket CR	1997.06.15	Budapest (HUN)
369	FR Yugoslavia	71	47	+24	Amaya Valdemoro	18	1997 EuroBasket CR	1997.06.14	Budapest (HUN)
368	Hungary	70	84	-14	Nieves Anula	23	1997 EuroBasket QF	1997.06.13	Budapest (HUN)
367	Lithuania	67	80	-13	Nieves Anula	23	1997 EuroBasket 1R	1997.06.11	Zalaegerszeg (HUN)
366	FR Yugoslavia	86	71	+15	Nieves Anula	24	1997 EuroBasket 1R	1997.06.10	Zalaegerszeg (HUN)
365	Ukraine	76	62	+14	Pilar Valero	14	1997 EuroBasket 1R	1997.06.08	Zalaegerszeg (HUN)
364	Czech Republic	82	78	+4	Ana Belén Álvaro, Nieves Anula	17	1997 EuroBasket 1R	1997.06.07	Zalaegerszeg (HUN)
363	Germany	71	72	-1	Ana Belén Álvaro	20	1997 EuroBasket 1R	1997.06.06	Zalaegerszeg (HUN)
362	Japan	90	71	+19			1997 Friendly	1997.05.24	Logroño
361	Hungary	82	52	+30			1997 Friendly	1997.05.23	Logroño
360	Bosnia and Herzegovina	85	58	+27			1997 Friendly	1997.05.22	Logroño
359	Italy	75	72	+3			1997 Friendly	1997.05.18	Cosenza (ITA)
358	France	84	61	+23			1997 Friendly	1997.05.17	Cosenza (ITA)
357	Canada	83	63	+20			1997 Friendly	1997.05.16	Cosenza (ITA)
356	France	68	62	+6			1997 Friendly	1997.05.07	San Fernando
355	France	55	67	-12			1997 Friendly	1997.05.06	Cádiz
354	Croatia	71	83	-12	Ana Belén Álvaro, Amaya Valdemoro	20	1997 EuroBasket qualification	1996.05.26	Oviedo
353	Germany	95	62	+33	Betty Cebrián	16	1997 EuroBasket qualification	1996.05.25	Oviedo
352	Moldova	95	62	+33	Marina Ferragut	20	1997 EuroBasket qualification	1996.05.24	Oviedo
351	Bulgaria	81	73	+8	Nieves Anula	14	1997 EuroBasket qualification	1996.05.23	Oviedo
350	Israel	83	52	+31	4 players	11	1997 EuroBasket qualification	1996.05.22	Oviedo
349	Lithuania	75	77	-2			1996 Friendly	1996.05.12	Logroño
348	Czech Republic	81	71	+10			1996 Friendly	1996.05.11	Logroño
347	Hungary	83	61	+22			1996 Friendly	1996.05.10	Logroño
346	Germany	82	76	+6			1996 Friendly	1996.05.04	Toulouse (FRA)
345	South Korea	72	79	-7			1996 Friendly	1996.05.03	Toulouse (FRA)
344	Russia	60	66	-6			1996 Friendly	1996.05.02	Toulouse (FRA)
343	Lithuania	77	70	+7			1996 Friendly	1996.04.24	Madrid
342	Ukraine	54	73	-19	Piluca Alonso	12	1995 EuroBasket 1R	1995.06.13	Brno (CZE)
341	Slovakia	66	72	-6	Piluca Alonso	16	1995 EuroBasket 1R	1995.06.12	Brno (CZE)
340	Hungary	105	108	-3	Carolina Mújica	21	1995 EuroBasket 1R	1995.06.11	Brno (CZE)
339	Moldova	101	59	+42	Betty Cebrián	19	1995 EuroBasket 1R	1995.06.10	Brno (CZE)
338	Croatia	70	73	-3	Paloma Sánchez	12	1995 EuroBasket 1R	1995.06.09	Brno (CZE)
337	Romania	97	63	+34	E. Bezos, Nieves Anula	16	1995 EuroBasket 1R	1995.06.08	Brno (CZE)
336	Germany	64	50	+14			1995 Friendly	1995.05.27	Osnabruck (GER)
335	Germany	67	61	+6			1995 Friendly	1995.05.26	Bremen (GER)
334	Germany	70	63	+7			1995 Friendly	1995.05.25	Ibbenburen (GER)
333	China	76	59	+17			1995 Friendly	1995.05.23	Segovia
332	France	54	48	+6			1995 Friendly	1995.05.21	San Fernando
331	Canada	74	66	+8			1995 Friendly	1995.05.20	San Fernando
330	Romania	69	70	-1			1995 Friendly	1995.05.19	San Fernando
329	France	76	65	+11			1995 Friendly	1995.05.18	Sanlúcar Barrameda
328	Cuba	80	83	-3			1995 Friendly	1995.05.13	Madrid
327	Japan	103	59	+44			1995 Friendly	1995.05.12	Madrid
326	Japan	77	79	-2			1995 Friendly	1995.05.10	Madrid
325	Cuba	81	72	+9			1995 Friendly	1995.05.09	Madrid
324	Canada	65	70	-5	Betty Cebrián	17	1994 World Cup CR	1994.06.12	Sydney (AUS)
323	Slovenia	69	90	-21	Blanca Ares	14	1994 World Cup CR	1994.06.11	Sydney (AUS)
322	Brazil	87	92	-5	Blanca Ares	36	1994 World Cup 2R	1994.06.10	Sydney (AUS)
321	Cuba	65	68	-3	Ana Belén Álvaro	21	1994 World Cup 2R	1994.06.08	Sydney (AUS)
320	China	76	60	+16	Paloma Sánchez	28	1994 World Cup 2R	1994.06.07	Sydney (AUS)
319	South Korea	89	88	+1	Blanca Ares	24	1994 World Cup 1R	1994.06.04	Hobart (AUS)
318	United States	71	92	-21	Laura Grande	14	1994 World Cup 1R	1994.06.03	Hobart (AUS)
317	New Zealand	117	54	+63	Betty Cebrián	17	1994 World Cup 1R	1994.06.02	Hobart (AUS)
316	France	67	51	+16			1994 Friendly	1994.05.17	Madrid
315	Czech Republic	81	53	+28			1994 Friendly	1994.05.15	Madrid
314	Sweden	72	64	+8			1994 Friendly	1994.05.11	Madrid
313	Sweden	95	68	+27			1994 Friendly	1994.05.10	Pozuelo
312	Hungary	71	64	+7			1994 Friendly	1994.05.08	Madrid
311	Sweden	100	87	+13			1994 Friendly	1994.05.07	Madrid
310	Slovenia	67	60	+7	Ana Belén Álvaro	17	1993 Mediterranean Games MR	1993.06.27	Lattes (FRA)
309	Italy	49	59	-10	Marina Ferragut	14	1993 Mediterranean Games MR	1993.06.25	Lattes (FRA)
308	Bosnia and Herzegovina	70	73	-3	Blanca Ares	18	1993 Mediterranean Games MR	1993.06.24	Lattes (FRA)
307	France	76	71	+5	Blanca Ares	24	1993 Mediterranean Games MR	1993.06.23	Lattes (FRA)
306	France	63	53	+10	Blanca Ares	24	1993 EuroBasket F	1993.06.13	Perugia (ITA)
305	Slovakia	73	55	+18	Blanca Ares	20	1993 EuroBasket SF	1993.06.12	Perugia (ITA)
304	Italy	56	66	-10	Blanca Ares	12	1993 EuroBasket 1R	1993.06.10	Perugia (ITA)
303	Bulgaria	76	70	+6	Blanca Ares	19	1993 EuroBasket 1R	1993.06.09	Perugia (ITA)
302	Poland	92	68	+24	Blanca Ares	20	1993 EuroBasket 1R	1993.06.08	Perugia (ITA)
301	France	59	63	-4			1993 Friendly	1993.05.29	Arlessortech (FRA)
300	France	59	53	+6			1993 Friendly	1993.05.28	Frontignan (FRA)
299	Cuba	62	81	-19			1993 Friendly	1993.05.22	Madrid
298	Russia	73	69	+4			1993 Friendly	1993.05.20	Madrid
297	Cuba	63	71	-8			1993 Friendly	1993.05.19	Madrid
296	Russia	64	59	+5			1993 Friendly	1993.05.18	Madrid
295	Cuba	91	75	+16			1993 Friendly	1993.05.16	Madrid
294	Russia	77	59	+18			1993 Friendly	1993.05.15	Madrid
293	Czechoslovakia	59	58	+1	Margarita Geuer	11	1992 Olympics CR	1992.08.07	Barcelona
292	Italy	92	80	+12	Blanca Ares, Ana Belén Álvaro	19	1992 Olympics CR	1992.08.05	Barcelona
291	United States	59	114	-55	Blanca Ares	13	1992 Olympics 1R	1992.08.03	Barcelona
290	Czechoslovakia	59	58	+1	Ana Belén Álvaro	10	1992 Olympics 1R	1992.08.01	Barcelona
289	China	63	66	-3	Blanca Ares	20	1992 Olympics 1R	1992.07.30	Barcelona
288	Russia	59	88	-29			1992 Friendly	1992.07.01	Madrid
287	Czechoslovakia	71	62	+9			1992 Friendly	1992.06.30	Madrid
286	Ukraine	94	76	+18			1992 Friendly	1992.06.29	Madrid
285	Russia	68	77	-9			1992 Friendly	1992.06.27	Madrid
284	Ukraine	68	60	+8			1992 Friendly	1992.06.26	Madrid
283	Czechoslovakia	69	81	-12	Margarita Geuer	24	1993 EuroBasket qualification	1992.05.17	Helsinki (FIN)
282	Sweden	111	64	+47	Blanca Ares	15	1993 EuroBasket qualification	1992.05.16	Helsinki (FIN)
281	Germany	83	95	-12	Marina Ferragut	19	1993 EuroBasket qualification	1992.05.15	Helsinki (FIN)
280	Israel	86	69	+17	Blanca Ares	20	1993 EuroBasket qualification	1992.05.14	Helsinki (FIN)
279	Finland	94	79	+15	Margarita Geuer	25	1993 EuroBasket qualification	1992.05.13	Helsinki (FIN)
278	Greece	92	62	+30			1992 Friendly	1992.05.08	Cuenca
277	Greece	76	64	+12			1992 Friendly	1992.05.06	Madrid
276	Russia	68	70	-2			1992 Friendly	1992.05.01	Yepes
275	Russia	69	64	+5			1992 Friendly	1992.04.30	Daimiel
274	Cuba	101	97	+4			1992 Friendly	1992.04.28	Madrid
273	Russia	79	75	+4			1992 Friendly	1992.04.27	Madrid
272	Cuba	79	69	+10			1992 Friendly	1992.04.18	Manzanares
271	Brazil	76	79	-3			1992 Friendly	1992.04.07	Madrid
270	Latvia	62	45	+17			1992 Friendly	1992.04.06	Madrid
269	Latvia	81	73	+8			1992 Friendly	1992.04.03	Cádiz
268	Brazil	86	75	+11			1992 Friendly	1992.04.01	Cádiz
267	Brazil	92	88	+4			1992 Friendly	1992.03.30	Cádiz
266	Latvia	65	66	-1			1992 Friendly	1992.03.28	Puerto Real
265	Poland	92	58	+34			1992 Friendly	1992.03.26	Puerto Real
264	Poland	69	52	+17			1992 Friendly	1992.03.24	Sanlucar Barrame
263	Poland	91	46	+45			1992 Friendly	1992.03.23	Cádiz
262	Canada	70	69	+1			1992 Friendly	1992.03.01	Consuegra
261	Canada	65	51	+14			1992 Friendly	1992.02.28	El Escorial
260	Poland	90	54	+36			1991 Friendly	1991.12.30	Pozuelo
259	Romania	87	69	+18			1991 Friendly	1991.12.29	Pozuelo
258	Greece	104	55	+49			1991 Friendly	1991.12.28	Pozuelo
257	Canada	50	64	-14			1991 Friendly	1991.11.03	Montreal (CAN)
256	Canada	62	69	-7			1991 Friendly	1991.11.02	Quebec (CAN)
255	Canada	57	60	-3			1991 Friendly	1991.10.31	Kingston (CAN)
254	Canada	57	50	+7			1991 Friendly	1991.10.30	Sudbury (CAN)
253	Canada	57	72	-15			1991 Friendly	1991.10.28	Toronto (CAN)
252	Canada	68	63	+5			1991 Friendly	1991.10.27	Ottawa (CAN)
251	France	77	73	+4	Blanca Ares	23	1991 Mediterranean Games MR	1991.07.11	Thessaloniki (GRE)
250	Greece	82	69	+13	Marina Ferragut	16	1991 Mediterranean Games MR	1991.07.09	Thessaloniki (GRE)
249	Albania	94	76	+18	Blanca Ares	21	1991 Mediterranean Games MR	1991.07.08	Thessaloniki (GRE)
248	Italy	76	63	+13	Cebrián, Geuer	11	1991 Mediterranean Games MR	1991.07.07	Thessaloniki (GRE)
247	Canada	71	63	+8			1991 Friendly	1991.06.02	Madrid
246	Canada	77	48	+29			1991 Friendly	1991.06.01	Madrid
245	Canada	82	65	+17			1991 Friendly	1991.05.30	Madrid
244	Canada	65	59	+6			1991 Friendly	1991.05.29	Madrid
243	Italy	78	65	+13			1991 Friendly	1991.05.22	Madrid
242	Italy	62	79	-17			1991 Friendly	1991.05.21	Segovia
241	Cuba	90	81	+9			1991 Friendly	1991.05.19	Madrid
240	Italy	93	82	+11			1991 Friendly	1991.05.18	Madrid
239	Cuba	81	66	+15			1991 Friendly	1991.05.11	Pozuelo
238	Czechoslovakia	60	57	+3			1991 Friendly	1991.05.01	Pozuelo
237	Czechoslovakia	78	65	+13			1991 Friendly	1991.04.27	Madrid
236	Hungary	63	79	-16			1990 Friendly	1990.12.30	Pozuelo
235	Germany	95	62	+33			1990 Friendly	1990.12.29	Pozuelo
234	France	68	82	-14			1990 Friendly	1990.12.28	Pozuelo
233	Denmark	45	62	-17	Mónica Messa	9	1991 EuroBasket qualification	1990.05.13	Athens (GRE)
232	Netherlands	67	65	+2	Blanca Ares	20	1991 EuroBasket qualification	1990.05.12	Athens (GRE)
231	Greece	75	61	+14	Marina Ferragut	16	1991 EuroBasket qualification	1990.05.11	Athens (GRE)
230	Hungary	64	62	+2	Betty Cebrián	12	1991 EuroBasket qualification	1990.05.10	Athens (GRE)
229	Israel	57	86	-29	Marina Ferragut	14	1991 EuroBasket qualification	1990.05.09	Athens (GRE)
228	Australia	97	83	+14			1990 Friendly	1990.05.05	Toulouse (FRA)
227	France	68	69	-1			1990 Friendly	1990.05.04	Toulouse (FRA)
226	Hungary	76	85	-9			1990 Friendly	1990.04.28	Gdansk (POL)
225	Poland	75	74	+1			1990 Friendly	1990.04.27	Gdansk (POL)
224	Australia	80	77	+3			1990 Friendly	1990.04.26	Gdansk (POL)
223	Cuba	85	72	+13			1990 Friendly	1990.04.21	Madrid
222	Cuba	70	74	-4			1990 Friendly	1990.04.18	Madrid
221	Hungary	44	59	-15			1989 Friendly	1989.08.02	Budapest (HUN)
220	Hungary	66	50	+16			1989 Friendly	1989.08.01	Budapest (HUN)
219	Soviet Union	65	108	-43			1989 Friendly	1989.06.03	Orléans (FRA)
218	China	98	77	+21			1989 Friendly	1989.06.02	St Jean de Bray
217	France	74	69	+5			1989 Friendly	1989.05.31	Orleans (FRA)
216	China	83	94	-11			1989 Friendly	1989.05.29	Pescara (ITA)
215	Yugoslavia	74	98	-24			1989 Friendly	1989.05.28	Pescara (ITA)
214	Italy	94	99	-5			1989 Friendly	1989.05.27	Pescara (ITA)
213	China	87	85	+2			1989 Friendly	1989.05.24	Palma de Mallorca
212	China	79	69	+10			1989 Friendly	1989.05.23	Ibiza
211	Hungary	88	79	+9			1989 Friendly	1989.05.17	Madrid
210	Netherlands	60	67	-7			1989 Friendly	1989.05.13	Talavera
209	Poland	86	66	+20			1989 Friendly	1989.04.29	Gdansk (POL)
208	Cuba	87	90	-3			1989 Friendly	1989.04.28	Gdansk (POL)
207	Czechoslovakia	72	90	-18			1989 Friendly	1989.04.26	Gdansk (POL)
206	Netherlands	74	64	+10			1989 Friendly	1989.04.25	Gdansk (POL)
205	Chinese Taipei	80	72	+8	Jiménez, Margarita Geuer	17	1988 Olympics qualification	1988.06.10	TAIPEI Singapur
204	Angola	89	57	+32	Mónica Messa, Margarita Geuer	18	1988 Olympics qualification	1988.06.09	Singapore (SIN)
203	China	62	101	-39	Margarita Geuer	18	1988 Olympics qualification	1988.06.08	Singapore (SIN)
202	Soviet Union	62	119	-57	Ana Junyer	16	1988 Olympics qualification	1988.06.07	Singapore (SIN)
201	Brazil	65	82	-17	Rocío Jiménez	15	1988 Olympics qualification	1988.06.06	Singapore (SIN)
200	Italy	73	64	+9			1988 Friendly	1988.05.30	Rome (ITA)
199	France	64	59	+5			1988 Friendly	1988.05.28	Draguinan (FRA)
198	France	76	77	-1			1988 Friendly	1988.05.27	Roquebrune (FRA)
197	Finland	82	78	+4	Margarita Geuer	18	1989 EuroBasket qualification	1988.05.15	Naantali (FIN)
196	Czechoslovakia	53	76	-23	Ana Belén Álvaro	19	1989 EuroBasket qualification	1988.05.14	Naantali (FIN)
195	West Germany	76	70	+6	Rocío Jiménez	17	1989 EuroBasket qualification	1988.05.13	Naantali (FIN)
194	England	104	48	+56	Rocío Jiménez	22	1989 EuroBasket qualification	1988.05.12	Naantali (FIN)
193	France	50	55	-5	Mª Alonso, Rocío Jiménez	19	1989 EuroBasket qualification	1988.05.11	Naantali (FIN)
192	Sweden	87	88	-1			1988 Friendly	1988.05.07	Idrottshuset (SU
191	Sweden	75	66	+9			1988 Friendly	1988.05.06	Huskvarna (SUE)
190	West Germany	92	61	+31			1988 Friendly	1988.04.30	Gdansk (POL)
189	Poland	85	89	-4			1988 Friendly	1988.04.29	Gdansk (POL)
188	Bulgaria	59	109	-50			1988 Friendly	1988.04.28	Gdansk (POL)
187	France	70	65	+5			1988 Friendly	1988.04.27	Gdansk (POL)
186	Czechoslovakia	72	90	-18			1988 Friendly	1988.04.26	Gdansk (POL)
185	Netherlands	74	64	+10			1988 Friendly	1988.04.25	Gdansk (POL)
184	Poland	73	71	+2			1988 Friendly	1988.04.18	Guadalajara
183	Poland	75	74	+1			1988 Friendly	1988.04.17	Albacete
182	Poland	71	73	-2			1988 Friendly	1988.04.16	Talavera
181	Italy	87	102	-15	Carolina Mújica	18	1987 EuroBasket CR	1987.09.11	Cádiz
180	Sweden	92	76	+16	Rocío Jiménez	19	1987 EuroBasket CR	1987.09.10	Cádiz
179	Italy	83	73	+10	Ana Junyer	21	1987 EuroBasket 1R	1987.09.08	Pto Santa María
178	Bulgaria	74	84	-10	Rocío Jiménez	22	1987 EuroBasket 1R	1987.09.07	Pto Santa María
177	Yugoslavia	58	60	-2	Rocío Jiménez	14	1987 EuroBasket 1R	1987.09.06	Pto Santa María
176	Czechoslovakia	47	49	-2	Ana Junyer	19	1987 EuroBasket 1R	1987.09.05	Pto Santa María
175	Finland	74	75	-1	Rocío Jiménez	15	1987 EuroBasket 1R	1987.09.04	Pto Santa María
174	Italy	70	79	-9			1987 Friendly	1987.08.28	L'Aquila (ITA)
173	Yugoslavia	62	90	-28			1987 Friendly	1987.08.23	Sofia (BUL)
172	Poland	72	70	+2			1987 Friendly	1987.08.22	Sofia (BUL)
171	China	73	107	-34			1987 Friendly	1987.08.21	Sofia (BUL)
170	Bulgaria	76	91	-15			1987 Friendly	1987.08.20	Sofia (BUL)
169	Soviet Union	54	95	-41			1987 Friendly	1987.08.19	Sofia (BUL)
168	Sweden	98	77	+21			1987 Friendly	1987.08.13	Pto Santa María
167	Sweden	89	84	+5			1987 Friendly	1987.08.11	Jerez Frontera
166	France	70	55	+15			1987 Friendly	1987.07.31	Ferrol
165	Soviet Union	57	107	-50			1987 Friendly	1987.07.30	Ferrol
164	France	78	59	+19			1987 Friendly	1987.07.29	Ferrol
163	Canada	66	52	+14			1987 Friendly	1987.07.28	Ferrol
162	China	94	103	-9			1987 Friendly	1987.05.30	Gdansk (POL)
161	Sweden	87	69	+18			1987 Friendly	1987.05.29	Gdansk (POL)
160	Poland	61	73	-12			1987 Friendly	1987.05.28	Gdansk (POL)
159	Hungary	60	81	-21			1987 Friendly	1987.05.27	Gdansk (POL)
158	Poland	62	41	+21			1987 Friendly	1987.05.26	Gdansk (POL)
157	Bulgaria	79	85	-6			1986 Friendly	1986.09.24	Madrid
156	Bulgaria	68	83	-15			1986 Friendly	1986.09.23	Huelva
155	Netherlands	55	61	-6			1986 Friendly	1986.09.05	Ubrique
154	Poland	77	85	-8			1986 Friendly	1986.09.04	Jerez Frontera
153	Netherlands	73	68	+5			1986 Friendly	1986.09.03	Pto Santa María
152	France	47	64	-17			1986 Friendly	1986.09.02	Cádiz
151	Canada	56	71	-15			1986 Friendly	1986.08.21	El Masnou
150	Canada	49	68	-19			1986 Friendly	1986.08.20	Castelldefels
149	Poland	48	58	-10			1986 Friendly	1986.08.17	Constanza (ROU)
148	France	46	54	-8			1986 Friendly	1986.08.16	Constanza (ROU)
147	Finland	57	59	-2			1986 Friendly	1986.08.15	Constanza (ROU)
146	South Korea	58	52	+6			1986 Friendly	1986.08.14	Constanza (ROU)
145	Romania	47	73	-26			1986 Friendly	1986.08.13	Constanza (ROU)
144	Czechoslovakia	47	58	-11			1986 Friendly	1986.07.30	Kosice (TCH)
143	Romania	60	76	-16			1986 Friendly	1986.07.28	Kosice (TCH)
142	Czechoslovakia	56	92	-36			1986 Friendly	1986.07.25	Bardejov (TCH)
141	Brazil	68	101	-33			1986 Friendly	1986.07.22	Tortosa
140	Brazil	54	103	-49			1986 Friendly	1986.07.21	Vicenscastellet
139	France	60	63	-3			1986 Friendly	1986.05.30	Orléans (FRA)
138	Czechoslovakia	81	94	-13			1986 Friendly	1986.05.29	Orléans (FRA)
137	France	74	70	+4			1986 Friendly	1986.05.28	Orléans (FRA)
136	France	72	57	+15			1986 Friendly	1986.05.24	Valencia
135	France	62	57	+5			1986 Friendly	1986.05.22	Alcázar de San Juan
134	Romania	73	93	-20	Rosa Castillo	16	1985 EuroBasket CR	1985.09.15	Treviso (ITA)
133	Netherlands	56	44	+12	Rocío Jiménez	17	1985 EuroBasket CR	1985.09.14	Treviso (ITA)
132	Soviet Union	42	115	-73	Ana Junyer, C. Jiménez	8	1985 EuroBasket 1R	1985.09.12	Treviso (ITA)
131	Belgium	84	51	+33	Rocío Jiménez	17	1985 EuroBasket 1R	1985.09.11	Treviso (ITA)
130	Poland	70	65	+5	Ana Junyer	24	1985 EuroBasket 1R	1985.09.10	Treviso (ITA)
129	Italy	46	77	-31	Margarita Geuer	12	1985 EuroBasket 1R	1985.09.09	Treviso (ITA)
128	Hungary	65	78	-13	Ana Junyer	19	1985 EuroBasket 1R	1985.09.08	Treviso (ITA)
127	Poland	81	93	-12			1985 Friendly	1985.09.02	Granville (FRA)
126	Netherlands	66	70	-4			1985 Friendly	1985.08.31	Flers (FRA)
125	West Germany	67	56	+11			1985 Friendly	1985.08.30	Cherbourg (FRA)
124	France	64	65	-1			1985 Friendly	1985.07.19	Cádiz
123	France	48	61	-13			1985 Friendly	1985.07.18	Barbate
122	France	68	62	+6			1985 Friendly	1985.07.15	Barbate
121	France	84	86	-2			1985 Friendly	1985.07.07	Messina (ITA)
120	Italy	73	79	-6			1985 Friendly	1985.07.06	Messina (ITA)
119	Soviet Union	61	109	-48			1985 Friendly	1985.07.05	Messina (ITA)
118	Romania	92	111	-19			1985 Friendly	1985.06.08	Chartres (FRA)
117	Hungary	75	94	-19			1985 Friendly	1985.06.07	Chartres (FRA)
116	France	56	66	-10			1985 Friendly	1985.06.06	Chartres (FRA)
115	France	61	69	-8			1984 Friendly	1984.08.25	Vilagarcía de Arousa
114	France	66	60	+6			1984 Friendly	1984.08.24	Ferrol
113	Netherlands	54	51	+3			1984 Friendly	1984.08.23	Ferrol
112	Netherlands	66	62	+4			1984 Friendly	1984.08.21	Carballo
111	France	70	78	-8			1984 Friendly	1984.07.09	Messina (ITA)
110	Hungary	58	84	-26			1984 Friendly	1984.07.08	Messina (ITA)
109	France	56	54	+2			1984 Friendly	1984.07.07	Messina (ITA)
108	Hungary	101	99	+2			1984 Friendly	1984.07.06	Messina (ITA)
107	Italy	63	70	-7			1984 Friendly	1984.07.05	Messina (ITA)
106	West Germany	64	63	+1	Elvira Gras	17	1983 EuroBasket CR	1983.09.18	Budapest (HUN)
105	Sweden	82	85	-3	Ana Junyer	26	1983 EuroBasket CR	1983.09.17	Budapest (HUN)
104	Netherlands	52	53	-1	Cecilia García	13	1983 EuroBasket 1R	1983.09.15	Miskolc (HUN)
103	Yugoslavia	57	75	-18	Ana Jiménez	16	1983 EuroBasket 1R	1983.09.14	Miskolc (HUN)
102	Romania	64	83	-19	Ana Junyer	18	1983 EuroBasket 1R	1983.09.13	Miskolc (HUN)
101	Hungary	64	94	-30	Ana Junyer	18	1983 EuroBasket 1R	1983.09.12	Miskolc (HUN)
100	Poland	59	92	-33	Ana Junyer	19	1983 EuroBasket 1R	1983.09.11	Miskolc (HUN)
99	Poland	58	66	-8			1983 Friendly	1983.09.09	Osijek (HUN)
98	Yugoslavia	52	60	-8			1983 Friendly	1983.09.07	Pozega (YUG)
97	Italy	62	74	-12			1983 Friendly	1983.09.06	Vukovar (CRO)
96	Czechoslovakia	68	86	-18			1983 Friendly	1983.09.04	Jicin (TCH)
95	Czechoslovakia	51	82	-31			1983 Friendly	1983.09.03	Podebrady (TCH)
94	Switzerland	94	61	+33	Ana Jiménez	25	1983 EuroBasket qualification	1983.04.11	Treviso (ITA)
93	Italy	80	92	-12	Rocío Jiménez	21	1983 EuroBasket qualification	1983.04.10	Treviso (ITA)
92	Finland	99	94	+5	Cecilia García	26	1983 EuroBasket qualification	1983.04.09	Treviso (ITA)
91	Ireland	85	59	+26	Rocío Jiménez	15	1983 EuroBasket qualification	1983.04.08	Treviso (ITA)
90	Cuba	85	103	-18			1983 Friendly	1983.03.30	Castelldefels
89	Cuba	69	84	-15			1983 Friendly	1983.03.29	Castelldefels
88	Italy	72	79	-7			1982 Friendly	1982.06.05	Orléans (FRA)
87	France	69	75	-6			1982 Friendly	1982.06.04	Orléans (FRA)
86	Cuba	64	81	-17			1982 Friendly	1982.06.03	Orléans (FRA)
85	Netherlands	57	80	-23			1982 Friendly	1982.05.30	Edinburgh (SCO)
84	Belgium	90	69	+21			1982 Friendly	1982.05.29	Edinburgh (SCO)
83	Scotland	87	48	+39			1982 Friendly	1982.05.28	Edinburgh (SCO)
82	Netherlands	74	69	+5			1982 Friendly	1982.05.26	Utrech (NED)
81	Netherlands	76	77	-1			1982 Friendly	1982.05.25	Lochem (NED)
80	Cuba	79	84	-5			1982 Friendly	1982.05.23	Ferrol
79	France	75	55	+20	Rosa Castillo	21	1980 EuroBasket CR	1980.09.27	Banjaluka (YUG)
78	Italy	56	74	-18	Ana Jiménez	15	1980 EuroBasket CR	1980.09.26	Banjaluka (YUG)
77	England	76	43	+33	Rosa Castillo	14	1980 EuroBasket CR	1980.09.24	Banjaluka (YUG)
76	Finland	84	71	+13	Rosa Castillo	32	1980 EuroBasket CR	1980.09.23	Banjaluka (YUG)
75	Czechoslovakia	65	89	-24	Rocío Jiménez	24	1980 EuroBasket 1R	1980.09.21	Prijedor (YUG)
74	Belgium	88	61	+27	Rosa Castillo	23	1980 EuroBasket 1R	1980.09.20	Prijedor (YUG)
73	Bulgaria	47	88	-41	Rosa Castillo	10	1980 EuroBasket 1R	1980.09.19	Prijedor (YUG)
72	France	80	57	+23			1980 Friendly	1980.09.15	Paris (FRA)
71	Cuba	72	105	-33			1980 Friendly	1980.07.11	Mataro
70	Cuba	49	88	-39			1980 Friendly	1980.07.10	Catellar del Vallès
69	Cuba	67	110	-43			1980 Friendly	1980.07.09	Gerona
68	West Germany	63	49	+14	Marisol Paíno	17	1980 EuroBasket qualification	1980.04.06	Vigo
67	Israel	83	79	+4	Marisol Paíno	28	1980 EuroBasket qualification	1980.04.05	Vigo
66	England	103	66	+37	Rosa Castillo	21	1980 EuroBasket qualification	1980.04.04	Vigo
65	England	83	63	+20			1980 Friendly	1980.03.31	Carballo
64	England	91	81	+10			1980 Friendly	1980.03.29	Mostoles
63	Netherlands	85	76	+9			1979 Friendly	1979.12.30	Gramanet
62	Netherlands	82	69	+13			1979 Friendly	1979.12.29	Figueras
61	Cuba	67	79	-12			1979 Friendly	1979.05.09	Vigo
60	Cuba	63	82	-19			1979 Friendly	1979.05.08	Zamora
59	Cuba	71	69	+2			1979 Friendly	1979.05.06	Palma de Mallorca
58	Sweden	87	62	+25	Rosa Castillo, Jiménez	22	1978 EuroBasket CR	1978.05.30	Poznan (POL)
57	West Germany	71	64	+7	Ángeles Liboreiro, Rosa Castillo	15	1978 EuroBasket CR	1978.05.29	Poznan (POL)
56	Netherlands	65	71	-6	Martínez, Jiménez	15	1978 EuroBasket CR	1978.05.26	Poznan (POL)
55	Romania	63	64	-1	Rocío Jiménez	23	1978 EuroBasket CR	1978.05.24	Poznan (POL)
54	Hungary	72	79	-7	Rocío Jiménez	18	1978 EuroBasket 1R	1978.05.22	Torun (POL)
53	Bulgaria	61	90	-29	Ana Jiménez	16	1978 EuroBasket 1R	1978.05.21	Torun (POL)
52	Italy	61	66	-5	Rosa Castillo	24	1978 EuroBasket 1R	1978.05.20	Torun (POL)
51	Netherlands	73	63	+10			1978 Friendly	1978.05.16	Doubeyerlan (NED)
50	Netherlands	66	82	-16			1978 Friendly	1978.05.14	Wychen (NED)
49	West Germany	63	66	-3	Rocío Jiménez	18	1978 EuroBasket qualification	1978.03.27	Wolfenbuttel (GER)
48	Ireland	73	49	+24	Rocío Jiménez	18	1978 EuroBasket qualification	1978.03.25	Wolfenbuttel (GER)
47	Scotland	110	58	+52	Rocío Jiménez	21	1978 EuroBasket qualification	1978.03.24	Wolfenbuttel (GER)
46	England	76	63	+13	Rocío Jiménez	30	1978 EuroBasket qualification	1978.03.23	Wolfenbuttel (GER)
45	France	61	81	-20			1978 Friendly	1978.03.21	Vicennes (FRA)
44	France	62	98	-36			1978 Friendly	1978.03.20	Montigny (FRA)
43	Belgium	79	81	-2			1978 Friendly	1978.03.18	Tongres (BEL)
42	Belgium	71	65	+6			1978 Friendly	1978.03.17	Koersel (BEL)
41	China	55	86	-31			1978 Friendly	1978.03.14	Barcelona
40	China	77	89	-12			1978 Friendly	1978.03.12	Gramanet
39	Yugoslavia	56	75	-19			1977 Friendly	1977.09.05	Barcelona
38	Yugoslavia	81	72	+9			1977 Friendly	1977.09.04	Hospitalet
37	Yugoslavia	63	71	-8			1977 Friendly	1977.09.03	Gramanet
36	Romania	62	82	-20	Rosa Castillo	27	1976 EuroBasket CR	1976.05.29	Ferrand Clermont (FRA)
35	Hungary	60	64	-4	García de Alcaraz	21	1976 EuroBasket CR	1976.05.28	Ferrand Clermont (FRA)
34	Belgium	73	51	+22	Rosa Castillo	32	1976 EuroBasket CR	1976.05.25	Ferrand Clermont (FRA)
33	West Germany	41	50	-9	Rosa Castillo	19	1976 EuroBasket CR	1976.05.24	Ferrand Clermont (FRA)
32	Czechoslovakia	34	69	-35	Ángeles Liboreiro	7	1976 EuroBasket 1R	1976.05.22	Vichy (FRA)
31	Netherlands	57	56	+1	Rosa Castillo	14	1976 EuroBasket 1R	1976.05.21	Vichy (FRA)
30	Bulgaria	62	72	-10	Rosa Castillo	18	1976 EuroBasket 1R	1976.05.20	Vichy (FRA)
29	West Germany	62	60	+2	Rosa Castillo	24	1976 EuroBasket qualification	1976.04.21	Alcoy
28	Denmark	95	51	+44	Amelia Suárez	22	1976 EuroBasket qualification	1976.04.20	Alcoy
27	Scotland	95	36	+59	Rosa Castillo	25	1976 EuroBasket qualification	1976.04.19	Alcoy
26	Canada	87	63	+24	Rosa Castillo	25	1976 Friendly	1976.04.14	Sevilla
25	West Germany	41	49	-8	García de Alcaraz	15	1974 EuroBasket CR	1974.09.02	Sassari (ITA)
24	Yugoslavia	71	80	-9	M. I. Lorenzo	12	1974 EuroBasket CR	1974.09.01	Sassari (ITA)
23	Denmark	71	49	+22	Rosa Castillo	16	1974 EuroBasket CR	1974.08.29	Sassari (ITA)
22	Netherlands	53	54	-1	Rosa Castillo	16	1974 EuroBasket CR	1974.08.28	Sassari (ITA)
21	Romania	72	76	-4	Nieves Bartrán	16	1974 EuroBasket 1R	1974.08.25	Nuoro (ITA)
20	Bulgaria	67	84	-17	Rosa Castillo, Bartrán	10	1974 EuroBasket 1R	1974.08.24	Nuoro (ITA)
19	Poland	50	84	-34	García de Alcaraz	12	1974 EuroBasket 1R	1974.08.23	Nuoro (ITA)
18	Cuba	55	71	-16	Rosa Castillo	18	1974 Friendly	1974.08.18	Cuenca
17	Cuba	66	74	-8	Ana Herrero	15	1974 Friendly	1974.08.16	Albacete
16	Cuba	61	79	-18	Rosa Castillo	23	1974 Friendly	1974.08.13	Cádiz
15	France	67	78	-11	Joaquina Cot, Rosa Castillo	15	1974 Friendly	1974.08.12	Cádiz
14	Belgium	72	51	+21	Rosa Castillo	23	1974 EuroBasket qualification	1974.05.01	A Coruña
13	Yugoslavia	57	104	-47	Rosa Castillo, Suárez	10	1974 EuroBasket qualification	1974.04.30	A Coruña
12	Sweden	71	46	+25	Rosa Castillo	22	1974 EuroBasket qualification	1974.04.28	A Coruña
11	England	84	45	+39	Rosa Castillo	18	1974 EuroBasket qualification	1974.04.27	A Coruña
10	Portugal	72	55	+17	Joaquina Cot, Coro Domínguez	16	1974 Friendly	1974.01.06	Lisboa (POR)
9	Portugal	82	36	+46	Joaquina Cot	18	1974 Friendly	1974.01.04	Cáceres
8	Australia	32	53	-21	Bernáldez, Couchoud	7	1971 Friendly	1971.05.02	Madrid
7	France	45	69	-24	Bernáldez, Pérez Villota	12	1970 EuroBasket qualification	1970.03.30	Girona
6	Hungary	37	53	-16	Bernáldez	10	1970 EuroBasket qualification	1970.03.29	Girona
5	Switzerland	61	44	+17	Pepa Senante	16	1970 EuroBasket qualification	1970.03.28	Girona
4	Switzerland	58	36	+22	María Ángeles Gómez, Pepa Senante	12	1970 Friendly	1970.03.24	Badalona
3	Cuba	50	70	-20	Pérez Villota	11	1969 Friendly	1969.09.28	Madrid
2	Switzerland	47	39	+8			1963 Friendly	1963.06.18	Barcelona
1	Switzerland	31	40	-9	María Ángeles Gómez	14	1963 Friendly	1963.06.16	Malgrat de Mar

== See also ==
- Spain women's national basketball team
- Medal winners in Spain women's national basketball team
- Spain women's national basketball team head to head
- Spanish Basketball Federation
- Basketball at the Summer Olympics
- FIBA Basketball World Cup
- EuroBasket Women
