= Rosa Castillo (basketball) =

Spanish basketball player (born 1956)

Personal information
- Born: 14 February 1956 (age 69); Barcelona, Spain
- Listed height: 180 cm (5 ft 11 in)

Career information
- Playing career: 1973–1992
- Position: Center / Forward

Career history
- 1973-1974: PEM Aerpons
- 1974-1985: Picadero JC - Comansi
- 1985-1989: Sabor d'Abans – Ravenós – C. Tarragona
- 1989-1990: Mikrobank El Masnou
- 1991-1992: Dorna Godella

Career highlights
- European Champions Cup champion (1992); 11x Spanish League champion (1975, 1976, 1978, 1980, 1981, 1983, 1987, 1988, 1989, 1990, 1992); 11x Spanish Cup champion (1975, 1978-80, 1983, 1985-89, 1992)

Rosa Castillo Araujo (born 14 February 1956) is a former Spanish women's basketball player, member of the Spain women's basketball team. She won 11 League titles and 11 Cups. She is the all-time top scorer of the Spanish Cup finals with 215 points in 13 finals.

== Club career ==
Rosa Castillo played in the Spanish League for 18 years, winning 11 League titles and 11 Cup titles. Even though it was the top tier, at the time even the best players were totally amateur.

She began playing with newly founded local club PEM, in Barcelona, at the age of 13, along with her sister and a future player of the Spain national team Mercedes Castillo. The team, coached by future Spain head coach María Planas got promoted three years in a row until they reached the top tier. Due to the local character of the club and the difficulties to play in the top tier, she signed for Picadero JC in 1974, which for sponsorship reasons was known as PICEFF Barcelona, and later Picadero Evax, Íntima Barcelona, Picadero Comansi and finally Natural Cusí, even changing their home ground: in 1984 the Picadero merged with El Masnou Basquetbol.

At 1.80 metres, Castillo symbolized the evolution of the league from her position, playing as a tall center in the mid-70s and ending her career in the early 90s as a small forward.

A serious knee injury in 1990 almost forced her to retire, but she recovered and signed for Dorna Godella in 1991, her only year as a real professional player and outside Catalonia. She retired in 1992 with an undefeated season and winning the treble (Spanish League, Spanish Cup and European Champions Cup) with Dorna Godella.

== National team ==
She made her debut with Spain women's national basketball team at the age of 18. She played with the senior team for 13 years, from 1974 to 1987, with a total of 113 caps and 10.8 PPG. She participated in six European Championships:

- 8th 1973 FIBA Europe Under-18 Championship for Women (youth)
- 6th 1975 FIBA Europe Under-18 Championship for Women (youth)
- 12th 1974 Eurobasket
- 10th 1976 Eurobasket
- 11th 1978 Eurobasket
- 10th 1980 Eurobasket
- 10th 1985 Eurobasket
- 6th 1987 Eurobasket
