= Rocío Jiménez =

Spanish basketball player

Rocío Jiménez Bañares
Personal information
- Born: January 2, 1959 (age 67) Madrid
- Listed height: 173 cm (5 ft 8 in)

Career information
- Playing career: 1974–1989
- Position: Small Forward

Career history
- 1978?-1981: Iberia
- 1981-1982: Celta Vigo
- ?-?: Complutense de Madrid
- ?-?: CREF
- 1987-1988: Tintoretto Getafe

Career highlights
- Liga Femenina champion (1982); Copa de la Reina champion (1982)

Rocío Jiménez Bañares (born January 2, 1959) is former Spanish basketball player, representing Spain from 1974 to 1988.

== Club career ==
A left-handed small forward, her most successful season was with Celta de Vigo, winning the 1981-1982 Liga Femenina de Baloncesto. She was the league's top scorer for three seasons. She also played in the Spanish clubs: Iberia, Complutense de Madrid, cb Alcalá and Tintoretto Getafe. She retired in 1989.

== National team ==
She made her debut with Spain women's national basketball team at the age of 15 (even before she played with the junior team in 1975). She played with the senior team for 14 years, from 1974 to 1988, with a total of 127 caps and 11.7 PPG. She participated in four European Championships:

- 10th 1980 FIBA Europe Under-16 Championship for Women (youth)
- 11th 1978 Eurobasket
- 10th 1980 Eurobasket
- 10th 1985 Eurobasket
- 6th 1987 Eurobasket
