= Ana Junyer =

Spanish basketball player (born 1963)

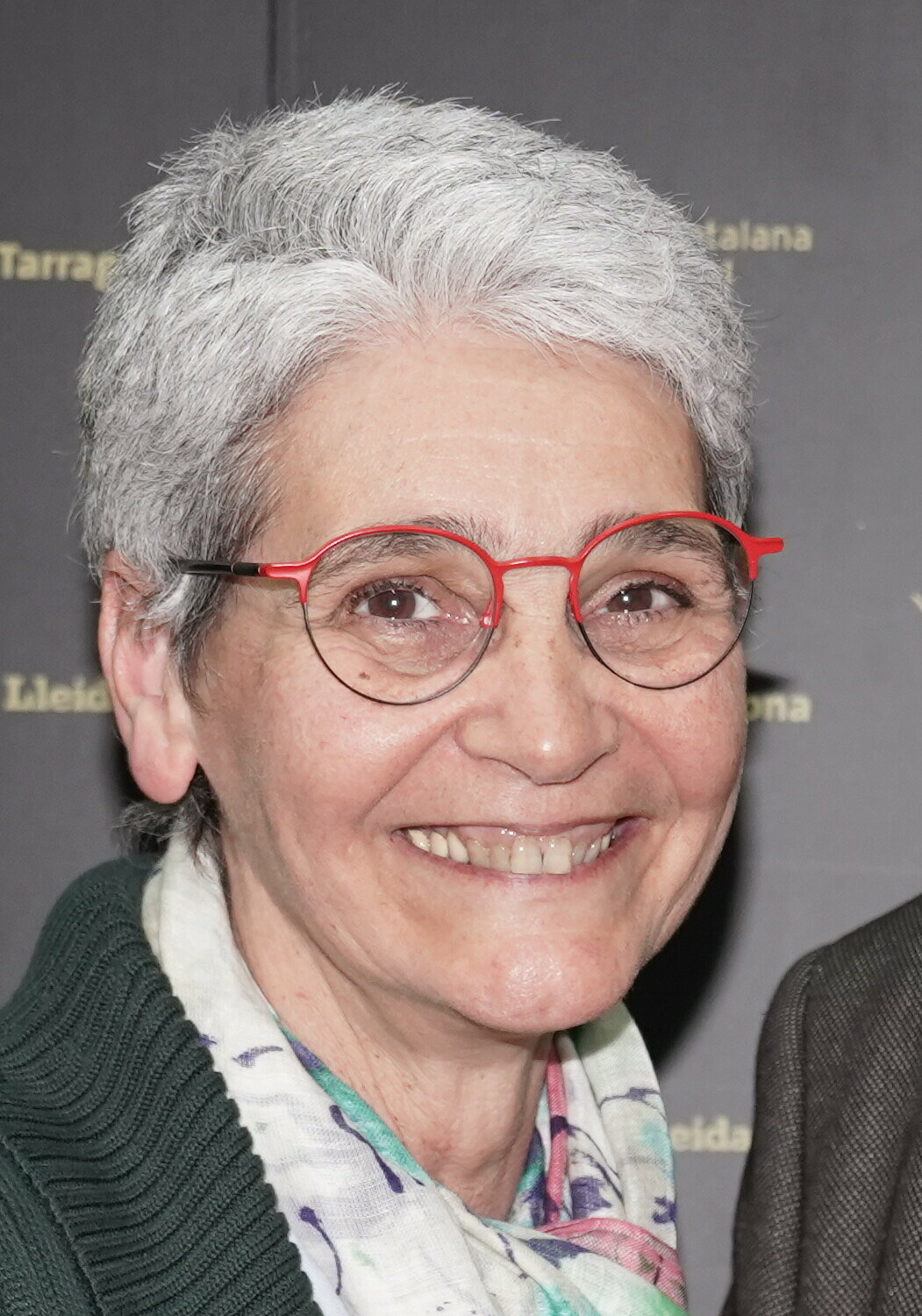

Personal information
- Born: July 4, 1963 (age 63) Figueres
- Listed height: 170 cm (5 ft 7 in)

Career information
- Playing career: 1981–1994
- Position: Point Guard

Career history
- youth-1981: La Casera Figueres
- 1981-1985: Picadero JC - Comansi
- 1985-1989: Sabor d'Abans – Ravenós
- 1989-1990: Mikrobank El Masnou
- 1991-1993: Dorna Godella
- 1993-1994: Reus / Universitari

Career highlights
- 2x European Champions Cup champion (1992, 1993); 8x Spanish League champion (1981, 1983, 1987, 1988, 1989, 1990, 1992, 1993); 7x Spanish Cup champion (1983, 1985-89, 1992)

Ana Junyer Genover (born 4 July 1963 in Figueres) is a former Spanish women's basketball player, member of the Spanish women's basketball team. As a coach, she has worked for Spanish clubs and the Spanish Federation, in charge of the 3x3 team.

== Club career ==
Ana Junyer Castillo played in the Spanish League for 13 years, winning 8 Spanish League titles and 7 Spanish Cup titles. Even though it was the top tier, at the time even the best players were totally amateur.

She began playing with local club Adepaf in Figueres, at the age of 13, soon playing with the seniors. At 18, she reached the top tier, and spent most of her career in Catalan clubs: Picadero JC -which for sponsorship reasons was known as PICEFF Barcelona, and later Picadero Evax, Íntima Barcelona, Picadero Comansi-, El Masnou Basquetbol, Sabor d'Abans, Caixa Tarragona Tortosa.

She was lured by the Dorna Godella project in 1991, having to renounce to play the 1992 Summer Olympics, and went to win twice the European Champions Cup.

In an undefeated season, she won the treble in 1992 with Dorna Godella: (Spanish League, Spanish Cup and European Champions Cup).

== National team ==
At 14 she was playing at both cadette (under-16) and junior (under-18) level for Spain. She made her debut with the senior team at the age of 17, under head coach María Planas. She played with the senior team for 13 years, from 1980 to 1992, with a total of 140 caps and 9.1 PPG. She participated in four European Championships:

- 11th 1978 FIBA Europe Under-16 Championship for Women (youth)
- 10th 1980 FIBA Europe Under-16 Championship for Women (youth)
- 9th 1981 FIBA Europe Under-18 Championship for Women (youth)
- 10th 1980 Eurobasket
- 11th 1983 Eurobasket
- 10th 1985 Eurobasket
- 6th 1987 Eurobasket
