= Marisol Paíno =

Spanish basketball player

Personal information
- Born: August 31, 1955 (age 71) Unión de Campos, Valladolid
- Listed height: 175 cm (5 ft 9 in)

Career information
- Playing career: 1976–1983
- Position: Center

Career history
- 1976-1983: Celta de Vigo Baloncesto

Career highlights
- 3x Spanish League champion (1977, 1979, 1982); 2x Spanish Cup champion (1981, 1982); 2x Spanish Cup runner-up (1979, 1980); 6x Spanish League topscorer; 3x Spanish League MVP

Marisol Paíno Serrano (born 31 August 1955) is a former Spanish professional basketball player representing Spain. She played in the Spanish League with Celta de Vigo for seven seasons (1976-1983), winning three Leagues and two Cups. She was six times the topscorer of the league and three times MVP. She played four consecutive Spanish Cup finals, winning in 1981 and 1982. She is third all-time scorer in Cup finals, with 102 points. She was one of the first professional players of the Spanish league.

== Club career and gender controversy ==
Born and raised in Valladolid, she tried basketball after seeing Miles Aiken play. She signed for Celta de Vigo at 20. In her debut season in October 1976 she scored 20, 37 and 24 points in her first three games. On January 28, 1977, after beating Evax in Barcelona she was accused of being a man by the Evax team. Her abilities, speed, jump, and overall physical appearance were totally different to the rest of the league players, raising doubts about her sexuality in rival teams, but she and her teammates always defended that she was a woman. She claimed she had received a hormonal treatment in her youth and she always refused to go through a medical examination. Her club suspected that the powerful Catalan teams of the time contributed to the controversy because Celta de Vigo was seen as a threat to their domination in the league. Press of the time were particularly interested in the topic, even appearing on the cover of Don Balón magazine, an influential weekly sports magazine printed in Barcelona.

In the 1982–83 season the Spanish Federation imposed a medical examination for all players of the league, but she refused to go through any of them and retired from professional sport at 27 years of age. She tried long jump and returned to basketball a few more years in Lugo, playing for Arjeriz Xuncas in a lower division where no medical examinations where required.

== National team ==
She made her debut with Spain women's national basketball team at the age of 22, a few months after the controversy in the league. She played with the senior team for 4 years, from 1977 to 1980, with a total of 23 caps and 11.7 PPG. Despite being the best Spanish player of her time, she never participated in a final tournament, even though Spain qualified for the 1978 and 1980 European Championships.
