= Nieves Anula =

Spanish basketball player

Personal information
- Born: May 1, 1973 (age 53) Santa Cruz de Tenerife
- Listed height: 174 cm (5 ft 9 in)

Career information
- Playing career: 1991–2006
- Position: Shooting guard

Career history
- 1991-1992: CB Caja Segovia
- 1992-1994: Arganda Intercambio (LF2)
- 1994-1997: Real Canoe NC
- 1997-1998: Pro-Getafe CDE
- 1998-2000: Real Canoe NC
- 2000-2001: Ros Casares Valencia
- 2001-2002: Universitari
- 2002-2006: Taranto Cras Basket

Career highlights
- 2x Spanish League champion (1998, 2001); 2x Spanish Cup champion (1996, 1998); Italian League champion (2003); Italian Cup champion (2003)

Nieves Emilia Anula Alameda, known as Nieves Anula (born 1 May 1973 is a Spanish former basketball player. She scored 28 points against Lithuania in the third-place match of the 2001 Eurobasket, winning the bronze medal with the Spanish national team.

== Club career ==
She spent most of her career in Spanish clubs (CB Caja Segovia, Real Canoe NC, Pool Getafe, Ros Casares Valencia and Universitari), playing in the Spanish first tier. In 1998 she won the league and the cup with Pool Getafe, but the club was disbanded shortly afterwards. In 2002 she signed for Italian team Taranto Cras Basket, winning the domestic treble in 2002 (Italian League, Italian Cup and Supercup).

In 1999 she became the first to woman to participate in the men's Three-Point Contest during the ACB All-Star weekend, and she tried again in 2000.

== National team ==
She made her debut with Spain women's national basketball team at the age of 22. She played with the senior team for 6 years, from 1995 to 2001, with a total of 87 caps and 10.7 PPG. She participated one World Championships and three European Championships:

- 9th 1995 Eurobasket
- 5th 1997 Eurobasket
- 5th 1998 World Championship
- 2001 Eurobasket
