= Rosi Sánchez =

Spanish basketball player

Personal information
- Born: 2 December 1974 (age 51) Las Palmas de Gran Canaria
- Listed height: 176 cm (5 ft 9 in)

Career information
- Playing career: 1992–2011
- Position: Small forward

Career history
- 1992-2000: Sandra Gran Canaria
- 2000-2003: Caja Rural de Canarias
- 2003–2004: Energia Caserta
- 2004–2005: Ros Casares Valencia
- 2005–2006: Caserta
- 2006–2007: Taranto Cras Basket
- 2007-2008: CB Islas Canarias
- 2008: PF Schio
- 2008–2009: Taranto Cras Basket
- 2009-2011: CB Islas Canarias

Career highlights
- Ronchetti Cup (1999); 2x Italian League champion (2008, 2009); 2x Spanish Cup champion (1999, 2000)

Rosaura del Carmen Sánchez Luján, known as Rosi Sánchez (born 2 December 1974) is a Spanish former basketball player who played most of her career in local club Sandra Gran Canaria and in the Italian League. She won two Spanish Cups, two Italian Leagues and the 1999 Ronchetti Cup. With the Spanish national team she won two bronze medals in the EuroBasket. She played in the EuroCup Women from 2006 to 2011 with four different teams.

== National team ==
Sánchez made her debut with the senior team in 1997, when she was 22 years old. She played from 1996 to 2004, with 121 caps with 7.1 PPG, participating in the Athens 2004 Olympics, two World Championships and three EuroBaskets:

- 5th 1991 FIBA Europe Under-16 Championship (youth)
- 5th 1997 Eurobasket
- 2001 Eurobasket
- 5th 2002 World Championship
- 2003 Eurobasket
- 6th 2004 Summer Olympics
