= Anna Montañana =

Spanish basketball player and coach (born 1980)

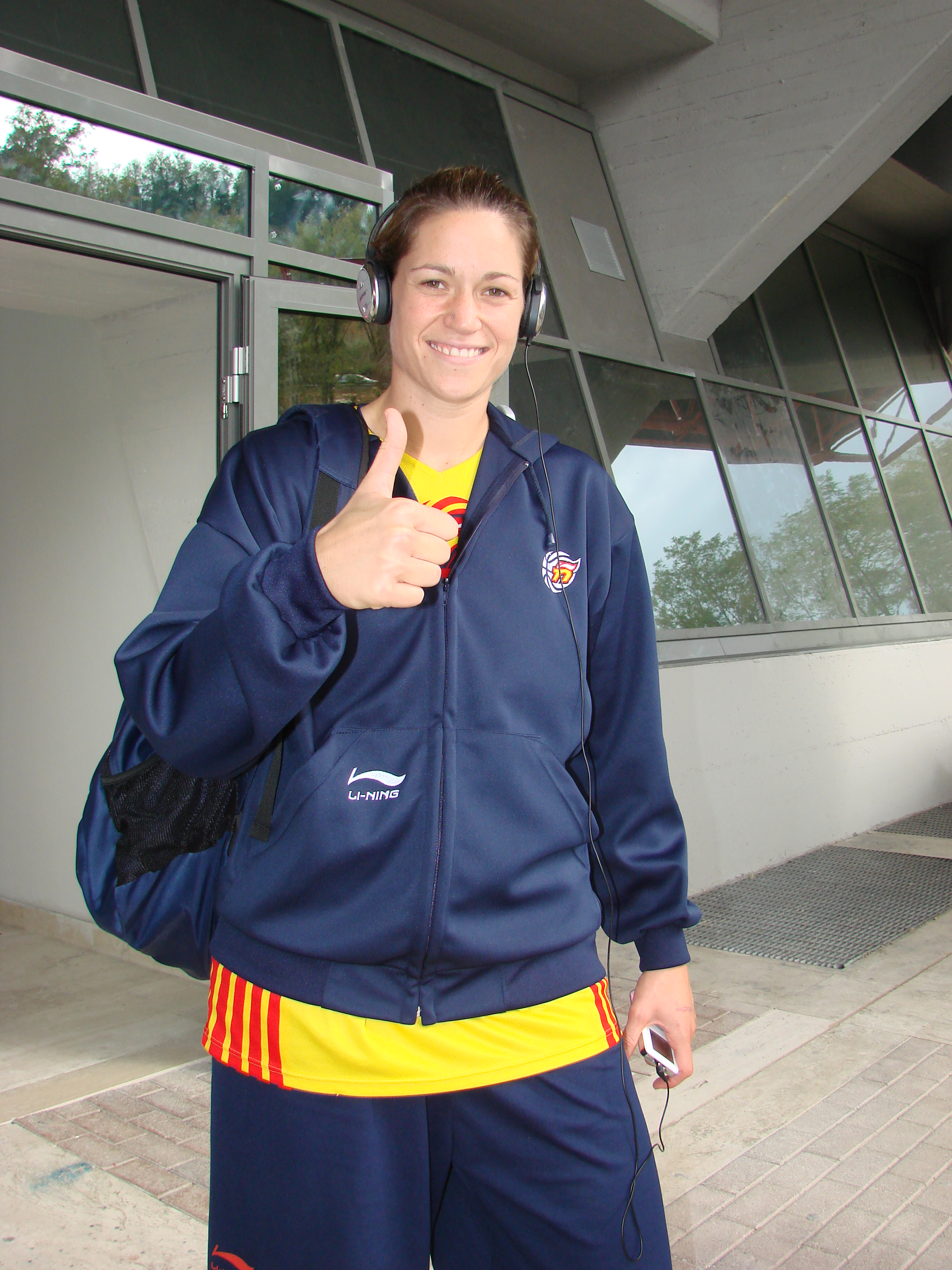

Montakit Fuenlabrada
- Title: Assistant coach
- League: Liga ACB

Personal information
- Born: October 24, 1980 (age 46) Valencia, Spain
- Listed height: 6 ft 1 in (1.85 m)
- Listed weight: 190 lb (86 kg)

Career information
- College: George Washington (2001–2005)
- WNBA draft: 2005: undrafted
- Playing career: 1998–2015
- Position: Forward

Career history

Playing
- 1998-2000: Valencia BFE
- 2000-2001: Halcón Viajes Avenida
- 2001–2005: George Washington
- 2005–2006: Ros Casares Valencia
- 2006–2007: Perfumerías Avenida
- 2008–2010: Ros Casares Valencia
- 2009: Minnesota Lynx
- 2010–2011: Perfumerías Avenida
- 2011–2012: USK Praha
- 2012–2013: Istanbul University
- 2013: Perfumerías Avenida
- 2013–2014: Cavigal Nice Basket 06
- 2014–2015: Perfumerías Avenida

Coaching
- 2018–present: Fuenlabrada (assistant)

Career highlights
- Euroleague champion (2011); 3× Spanish League champion (2009, 2011, 2013); 3× Spanish Cup champion (2009, 2012, 2015); Czech League champion (2012); Czech Cup champion (2012)
- Stats at Basketball Reference

Anna Montañana Gimeno (born October 24, 1980) is a former professional basketball player, representing Spain. She spent most of her career in Europe, and went to play in the WNBA for the Minnesota Lynx in 2009.

== Club career ==
Montañana was born in Alboraya, where she started playing basketball, and she went to play for nearby Dorna Godella, the most important Spanish team at the time. While playing for the cadettes and the junior teams, she made her debut in the top tier of the Spanish League with the senior team one day before her 14th birthday. She played in several Spanish clubs from 1998 to 2001, when she moved to the United States to complete a college degree and play for the George Washington team.

She continued most of her career in Europe (Spain, Czech Republic, Turkey and France), playing also for the Minnesota Lynx in 2009. She retired in Perfumerías Avenida in 2015.

== Coaching career ==
On 8 February 2017, Montañana signed with Liga ACB team Baloncesto Fuenlabrada for being assistant coach, thus becoming the first woman to be part of the technical staff in the Spanish men's top league.

== National team ==
She made her debut with Spain women's national basketball team at the age of 25. She played with the senior team for 7 years, from 2005 to 2012, getting 129 caps and 11.1 PPG. She participated in one Olympic tournament (Beijing 2008), two World Championships and three European Championships:

- 1998 FIBA Europe Under-18 Championship for Women (youth)
- 5th 2000 FIBA Europe Under-18 Championship for Women (youth)
- 2005 Eurobasket
- 8th 2006 World Championship
- 2007 Eurobasket
- 5th 2008 Summer Olympics
- 2009 Eurobasket
- 2010 World Championship

== WNBA career statistics ==
Legend
GP	Games played	GS	Games started	MPG	Minutes per game	RPG	Rebounds per game
APG	Assists per game	SPG	Steals per game	BPG	Blocks per game	PPG	Points per game
TO	Turnovers per game	FG%	Field-goal percentage	3P%	3-point field-goal percentage	FT%	Free-throw percentage
**Bold**	Career best	°	League leader

=== Regular season ===
Year	Team	GP	GS	MPG	FG%	3P%	FT%	RPG	APG	SPG	BPG	TO	PPG
2009	Minnesota	16	1	10.6	.389	.333	1.000	1.6	1.2	0.6	0.0	0.8	2.2
Career	1 year, 1 team	16	1	10.6	.389	.333	1.000	1.6	1.2	0.6	0.0	0.8	2.2

== George Washington statistics ==
Legend
GP	Games played	GS	Games started	MPG	Minutes per game
FG%	Field goal percentage	3P%	3-point field goal percentage	FT%	Free throw percentage
RPG	Rebounds per game	APG	Assists per game	SPG	Steals per game
BPG	Blocks per game	PPG	Points per game	**Bold**	Career high

Year	Team	GP	Points	FG%	3P%	FT%	RPG	APG	SPG	BPG	PPG
2001-02	George Washington	26	126	41.5	18.2	60.0	4.0	2.0	0.9	0.3	4.8
2002-03	George Washington	**32**	308	**48.6**	**33.8**	80.0	6.2	3.5	1.3	**0.5**	9.6
2003-04	George Washington	30	361	44.0	31.8	**81.8**	**7.6**	**5.4**	2.3	0.2	12.0
2004-05	George Washington	**32**	**535**	41.9	32.9	78.4	6.8	4.0	**2.4**	0.4	**16.7**
Career		120	1330	43.9	31.3	78.1	6.2	3.8	1.8	0.4	11.1
