= EuroBasket Women 1976 =

EuroBasket 1976 Women
15th FIBA European Women's Basketball Championship

Tournament details
- Host country: France
- Dates: 20–29 May
- Teams: 13

Final positions
- Champions: Soviet Union (13th title)

Tournament statistics
- Top scorer: (Socialist Federal Republic of Yugoslavia) Veger-Demšar (23.8)

Official website
- Official website (archive)

The 1976 European Women's Basketball Championship, commonly called EuroBasket Women 1976, was the 15th regional championship held by FIBA Europe. The competition was held in France and took place from 20 May to 29 May 1976. Soviet Union won the gold medal and Czechoslovakia the silver medal while Bulgaria won the bronze.

== Qualification ==
=== Group A ===
Pl	Team	Pld	W	L	PF	PA
1	Spain	3	3	0	242	149
2	West Germany	3	2	1	192	139
3	Denmark	3	1	2	166	200
4	Scotland	3	0	3	125	237

April 19	Spain	85–38	Scotland
April 19	West Germany	56–39	Denmark
April 20	Spain	95–51	Denmark
April 20	West Germany	76–38	Scotland
April 21	Denmark	76–49	Scotland
April 21	Spain	62–60	West Germany

=== Group B ===
Pl	Team	Pld	W	L	PF	PA
?	Poland	3	?	?	?	?
?	(Socialist Federal Republic of Yugoslavia) Yugoslavia	3	?	?	?	?
3	Sweden	3	1	2	206	206
4	Austria	3	0	3	126	288

April 19	Yugoslavia (Socialist Federal Republic of Yugoslavia)	108–47	Austria
April 19	Poland	76–61	Sweden
April 20	Poland	98–38	Austria
April 20	Yugoslavia (Socialist Federal Republic of Yugoslavia)	89–63	Sweden
April 21	Sweden	82–41	Austria
April 21	Poland	?–?	(Socialist Federal Republic of Yugoslavia) Yugoslavia

=== Group C ===
Pl	Team	Pld	W	L	PF	PA
1	Netherlands	3	3	0	219	129
2	Belgium	3	2	1	99	117
?	Israel	3	?	?	?	?
?	England	3	?	?	?	?

April 19	Netherlands	56–32	Belgium
April 19	Israel	?–?	England
April 20	Netherlands	80–32	England
April 20	Belgium	67–61	Israel
April 21	Belgium	Walkover	England
April 21	Netherlands	83–65	Israel

== First stage ==
=== Group A ===
Pl	Team	Pld	W	L	PF	PA
1	Soviet Union	3	3	0	364	167
2	(Socialist Federal Republic of Yugoslavia) Yugoslavia	3	2	1	227	251
3	Romania	3	1	2	241	263
4	Belgium	3	0	3	184	335

May 20	Yugoslavia (Socialist Federal Republic of Yugoslavia)	97–71	Belgium
May 20	Soviet Union	127–60	Romania
May 21	Romania	111–65	Belgium
May 21	Soviet Union	110–59	(Socialist Federal Republic of Yugoslavia) Yugoslavia
May 22	Soviet Union	127–48	Belgium
May 20	Yugoslavia (Socialist Federal Republic of Yugoslavia)	71–70	Romania

=== Group B ===
Pl	Team	Pld	W	L	PF	PA
1	Poland	3	3	0	200	179
2	Italy	3	2	1	170	170
3	Hungary	3	1	2	161	163
4	West Germany	3	0	3	157	176

May 20	Hungary	55–44	West Germany
May 20	Poland	74–56	Italy
May 21	Italy	59–53	West Germany
May 21	Poland	64–63	Hungary
May 22	Poland	62–60	West Germany
May 22	Italy	55–43	Hungary

=== Group C ===
Pl	Team	Pld	W	L	PF	PA
1	(Czech Republic) Czechoslovakia	3	3	0	222	136
2	Bulgaria	3	2	1	193	198
3	Spain	3	1	2	153	197
4	Netherlands	3	0	3	179	216

May 20	Bulgaria	72–62	Spain
May 20	Czechoslovakia (Czech Republic)	86–54	Netherlands
May 21	Spain	57–56	Netherlands
May 21	Czechoslovakia (Czech Republic)	67–48	Bulgaria
May 22	Czechoslovakia (Czech Republic)	69–34	Spain
May 22	Bulgaria	73–69	Netherlands

== Second stage ==
=== Championship Group ===
Pl	Team	Pld	W	L	PF	PA
1	Soviet Union	6	6	0	493	274
2	(Czech Republic) Czechoslovakia	6	5	1	374	339
3	Bulgaria	6	3	3	339	395
4	France	6	3	3	343	351
5	(Socialist Federal Republic of Yugoslavia) Yugoslavia	6	2	4	396	444
6	Poland	6	1	5	357	413
7	Italy	6	1	5	327	413

May 24	Czechoslovakia (Czech Republic)	91–63	Poland
May 24	Soviet Union	96–57	Bulgaria
May 24	France	58–41	Italy
May 25	Bulgaria	54–53	(Socialist Federal Republic of Yugoslavia) Yugoslavia
May 25	Czechoslovakia (Czech Republic)	62–56	France
May 25	Soviet Union	52–23	Poland
May 26	Czechoslovakia (Czech Republic)	60–51	Italy
May 26	Yugoslavia (Socialist Federal Republic of Yugoslavia)	90–81	Poland
May 26	Soviet Union	83–56	France
May 27	France	70–60	(Socialist Federal Republic of Yugoslavia) Yugoslavia
May 27	Soviet Union	90–49	Italy
May 27	Bulgaria	71–64	Poland
May 28	Yugoslavia (Socialist Federal Republic of Yugoslavia)	75–65	Italy
May 28	Soviet Union	62–30	(Czech Republic) Czechoslovakia
May 28	Bulgaria	53–50	France
May 29	Czechoslovakia (Czech Republic)	64–59	(Socialist Federal Republic of Yugoslavia) Yugoslavia
May 29	France	53–52	Poland
May 29	Italy	65–56	Bulgaria

1976 FIBA European Women's Basketball Championship champion

Soviet Union
Thirteenth title

=== 8th to 13th Places Group ===
Pl	Team	Pld	W	L	PF	PA
1	Hungary	5	5	0	346	282
2	Romania	5	4	1	401	305
3	Spain	5	2	3	293	303
4	Netherlands	5	2	3	311	325
5	Belgium	5	1	4	287	401
6	West Germany	5	1	4	283	305

May 24	Hungary	73–65	Netherlands
May 24	West Germany	50–41	Spain
May 25	Romania	81–57	Netherlands
May 25	Spain	73–51	Belgium
May 26	Romania	71–54	West Germany
May 26	Hungary	87–57	Belgium
May 27	Belgium	68–67	West Germany
May 27	Hungary	67–56	Romania
May 28	Netherlands	70–68	West Germany
May 28	Hungary	64–60	Spain
May 29	Netherlands	63–46	Belgium
May 29	Romania	82–62	Spain

== Final standings ==
Place	Team	PE
Gold medal	Soviet Union	Same position
Silver medal	(Czech Republic) Czechoslovakia	Same position
Bronze medal	Bulgaria	▲2
4	France	▲3
5	(Socialist Federal Republic of Yugoslavia) Yugoslavia	▲3
6	Poland	▲3
7	Italy	▼4
8	Hungary	▼4
9	Romania	▼3
10	Spain	▲2
11	Netherlands	Same position
12	Belgium	New entry
13	West Germany	▼3
