= EuroBasket Women 1974 =

Basketball tournament

EuroBasket 1974 Women
14th FIBA European Women's Basketball Championship

Tournament details
- Host country: Italy
- Dates: 23 August – 3 September
- Teams: 13

Final positions
- Champions: Soviet Union (12th title)

Official website
- Official website (archive)

The 1974 European Women Basketball Championship, commonly called EuroBasket Women 1974, was the 14th regional championship held by FIBA Europe. The competition was held in Italy and took place from 23 August to 3 September 1974. Soviet Union won the gold medal and Czechoslovakia the silver medal while Italy won the bronze.

== First stage ==
=== Group A ===
Pl	Team	Pld	W	L	PF	PA
1	Soviet Union	3	3	0	277	164
2	Hungary	3	2	1	179	173
3	(Socialist Federal Republic of Yugoslavia) Yugoslavia	3	1	2	185	210
4	West Germany	3	0	3	137	231

August 23	Soviet Union	106–47	West Germany
August 23	Hungary	65–57	(Socialist Federal Republic of Yugoslavia) Yugoslavia
August 24	Yugoslavia (Socialist Federal Republic of Yugoslavia)	75–54	West Germany
August 24	Soviet Union	80–64	Hungary
August 25	Hungary	50–36	West Germany
August 25	Soviet Union	91–53	(Socialist Federal Republic of Yugoslavia) Yugoslavia

=== Group B ===
Pl	Team	Pld	W	L	PF	PA
1	Bulgaria	3	3	0	239	205
2	Romania	3	2	1	213	214
3	Poland	3	1	2	216	194
4	Spain	3	0	3	189	244

August 23	Bulgaria	79–69	Romania
August 23	Poland	84–50	Spain
August 24	Bulgaria	84–67	Spain
August 24	Romania	68–63	Poland
August 25	Bulgaria	76–69	Poland
August 25	Romania	76–72	Spain

=== Group C ===
Pl	Team	Pld	W	L	PF	PA
1	(Czech Republic) Czechoslovakia	3	3	0	220	124
2	France	3	2	1	191	150
3	Netherlands	3	1	2	160	163
4	Denmark	3	0	3	121	255

August 23	Czechoslovakia (Czech Republic)	64–42	Netherlands
August 23	France	88–43	Denmark
August 24	Czechoslovakia (Czech Republic)	103–34	Denmark
August 24	France	55–54	Netherlands
August 25	Czechoslovakia (Czech Republic)	53–48	France
August 25	Netherlands	64–44	Denmark

== Second stage ==
=== Championship group ===
Pl	Team	Pld	W	L	PF	PA
1	Soviet Union	6	6	0	543	302
2	(Czech Republic) Czechoslovakia	6	5	1	388	383
3	Italy	6	3	3	270	320
4	Hungary	6	3	3	339	343
5	Bulgaria	6	2	4	392	419
6	Romania	6	1	5	343	444
7	France	6	1	5	311	375

August 27	Czechoslovakia (Czech Republic)	60–40	Italy
August 27	Bulgaria	76–74	France
August 28	Soviet Union	104–58	(Czech Republic) Czechoslovakia
August 28	Italy	52–45	Romania
August 29	Czechoslovakia (Czech Republic)	64–55	Hungary
August 29	Soviet Union	99–41	Romania
August 29	France	46–42	Italy
August 31	Hungary	67–56	Romania
August 31	Soviet Union	84–38	France
August 31	Italy	53–44	Bulgaria
September 1	Czechoslovakia (Czech Republic)	81–65	Romania
September 1	Hungary	53–39	France
September 1	Soviet Union	95–69	Bulgaria
September 2	Hungary	56–53	Bulgaria
September 2	Soviet Union	81–32	Italy
September 3	Romania	67–66	France
September 3	Czechoslovakia (Czech Republic)	72–71	Bulgaria
September 3	Italy	51–44	Hungary

1974 FIBA European Women's Basketball Championship champion

Soviet Union
Twelfth title

=== 8th to 13th Group ===
Pl	Team	Pld	W	L	PF	PA
1	(Socialist Federal Republic of Yugoslavia) Yugoslavia	5	5	0	360	276
2	Poland	5	4	1	399	225
3	West Germany	5	3	2	262	302
4	Netherlands	5	2	3	275	297
5	Spain	5	1	4	286	316
6	Denmark	5	0	5	213	379

August 27	West Germany	64–54	Denmark
August 27	Yugoslavia (Socialist Federal Republic of Yugoslavia)	53–51	Poland
August 28	Netherlands	54–53	Spain
August 28	Poland	87–44	West Germany
August 29	Spain	71–49	Denmark
August 29	Yugoslavia (Socialist Federal Republic of Yugoslavia)	72–58	Netherlands
August 31	Poland	100–24	Denmark
August 31	West Germany	51–45	Netherlands
September 1	Yugoslavia (Socialist Federal Republic of Yugoslavia)	80–71	Spain
September 1	Poland	77–54	Netherlands
September 2	Yugoslavia (Socialist Federal Republic of Yugoslavia)	80–42	Denmark
September 2	West Germany	49–41	Spain

== Final standings ==
Rank	Team	PE
Gold medal	Soviet Union	Same position
Silver medal	(Czech Republic) Czechoslovakia	▲1
Bronze medal	Italy	▲7
4	Hungary	▲2
5	Bulgaria	▼3
6	Romania	▼1
7	France	▼3
8	(Socialist Federal Republic of Yugoslavia) Yugoslavia	Same position
9	Poland	Same position
10	West Germany	New entry
11	Netherlands	Same position
12	Spain	New entry
13	Denmark	New entry
