= EuroBasket Women 2001 =

2001 edition of the EuroBasket Women

EuroBasket 2001 Women
28th FIBA European Women's Basketball Championship

Tournament details
- Host country: France
- Dates: September 14 – 23
- Teams: 12 (from 49 federations)
- Venues: 3 (in 3 host cities)

Final positions
- Champions: France (1st title)
- Runners-up: Russia
- Third place: Spain
- Fourth place: Lithuania

Tournament statistics
- MVP: (France) Catherine Melain
- Top scorer: (Poland) Dydek 24.4
- Top rebounds: (Poland) Dydek 10.9
- Top assists: (Hungary) Ivanyi 6.4
- PPG (Team): France 78.3
- RPG (Team): Russia 39.6
- APG (Team): France 21.6

Official website
- EuroBasket Women 2001

EuroBasket Women 2001 occurred in France from September 14 to September 23, 2001. The winners were the home team France, followed by Russia and Spain.

== Venues ==
The tournament was held in three cities in France: Orléans, Le Mans and Gravelines. The arenas, in which the tournament was held, were: in Orléans, Palais des Sports; in Le Mans, Antarès; and in Gravelines, Gravelines Sportica.

== Qualification ==
The qualification to the tournament was held in 1999 and 2000. Twenty teams were divided into five groups of four. The top two qualified to the tournament. The following teams qualified to the EuroBasket Women 2001:

- Slovakia (1st in Group A)
- Lithuania (1st in Group B)
- Russia (1st in Group C)
- Spain (1st in Group D)
- Ukraine (1st in Group E)
- Greece (2nd in Group A)
- Romania (2nd in Group B)
- Hungary (2nd in Group C)
- Czech Republic (2nd in Group D)
- (Federal Republic of Yugoslavia) Yugoslavia (2nd in Group E)

In addition to the qualified teams, who went through the qualification process, the host nation France automatically qualified to the tournament. Also, Poland, the gold medalist of EuroBasket 1999 Women, qualified to the tournament automatically.

== Preliminary round ==
Times given below are in Central European Summer Time (UTC+2).

=== Group A ===
	Team	Pld	W	L	PF	PA	Diff	Pts
1.	France	5	5	0	406	320	+86	10
2.	Spain	5	3	2	397	344	+53	8
3.	Poland	5	3	2	354	329	+25	8
4.	(Federal Republic of Yugoslavia) Yugoslavia	5	3	2	383	373	+10	8
5.	Romania	5	1	4	315	404	– 89	6
6.	Ukraine	5	0	5	322	407	– 85	5

14 September
14:30

Yugoslavia (Federal Republic of Yugoslavia)	83–62	Ukraine

14 September
17:00

Spain	78–68	Poland

14 September
20:00

Romania	52–91	France

15 September
15:00

Ukraine	65–93	Spain

15 September
17:30

Poland	76–55	Romania

15 September
20:00

France	88–67	(Federal Republic of Yugoslavia) Yugoslavia

16 September
15:00

Romania	61–83	Spain

16 September
17:30

France	84–71	Ukraine

16 September
20:00

Yugoslavia (Federal Republic of Yugoslavia)	66–83	Poland

18 September
15:00

Ukraine	67–86	Romania

18 September
17:30

Spain	79–80	(Federal Republic of Yugoslavia) Yugoslavia

18 September
20:00

Poland	66–73	France

19 September
15:00

Yugoslavia (Federal Republic of Yugoslavia)	87–61	Romania

19 September
17:30

Poland	61–57	Ukraine

19 September
20:00

France	70–64	Spain

=== Group B ===
	Team	Pld	W	L	PF	PA	Diff	Pts
1.	Russia	5	4	1	356	276	+80	9
2.	Lithuania	5	4	1	371	358	+13	9
3.	Hungary	5	3	2	317	302	+15	8
4.	Slovakia	5	2	3	337	341	– 4	7
5.	Greece	5	1	4	319	380	−61	6
6.	Czech Republic	5	1	4	328	371	−43	6

14 September
14:30

Greece	75–78	Lithuania

14 September
17:00

Czech Republic	70–85	Slovakia

14 September
20:00

Hungary	65–61	Russia

15 September
15:00

Lithuania	82–80	Czech Republic

15 September
17:30

Slovakia	56–61	Hungary

15 September
20:00

Russia	80–35	Greece

16 September
15:00

Hungary	55–57	Czech Republic

16 September
17:30

Russia	78–70	Lithuania

16 September
20:00

Greece	74–81	Slovakia

18 September
15:00

Lithuania	65–62	Hungary

18 September
17:30

Czech Republic	67–72	Greece

18 September
20:00

Russia	60–52	Slovakia

19 September
15:00

Greece	63–74	Hungary

19 September
17:30

Slovakia	63–76	Lithuania

19 September
20:00

Russia	77–54	Czech Republic

== Knockout stage ==
=== Championship bracket ===
Quarter-finals
September 21, 2001
Russia	64
FR Yugoslavia	59
September 21, 2001
Spain	71
Hungary	60
September 21, 2001
France	72
Slovakia	56
September 21, 2001
Lithuania	83
Poland	81

Semi-finals
September 22, 2001
Russia	74
Spain	59
September 22, 2001
France	75
Lithuania	44

Final
September 23, 2001
Russia	68
France	73
Third place
September 23, 2001
Spain	89
Lithuania	74

=== 5th place bracket ===
Semi-finals
September 22, 2001
(Federal Republic of Yugoslavia) Yugoslavia	78
Hungary	58
September 22, 2001
Slovakia	66
Poland	80

Fifth place
September 23, 2001
(Federal Republic of Yugoslavia) Yugoslavia	82
Poland	76
Seventh place
September 23, 2001
Hungary	79
Slovakia	68

== Final standings ==
Place	Team
1	France
2	Russia
3	Spain
4	Lithuania
5	FR Yugoslavia
6	Poland
7	Hungary
8	Slovakia
9	Czech Republic
10	Greece
11	Ukraine
12	Romania
