= EuroBasket Women 1978 =

EuroBasket 1978 Women
16th FIBA European Women's Basketball Championship

Tournament details
- Host country: Poland
- Dates: 20–30 May
- Teams: 13

Final positions
- Champions: Soviet Union (14th title)

Official website
- Official website (archive)

The 1978 European Women Basketball Championship, commonly called EuroBasket Women 1978, was the 16th regional championship held by FIBA Europe. The competition was held in Poland and took place from 20 May to 30 May 1978. Soviet Union won the gold medal and Yugoslavia the silver medal while Czechoslovakia won the bronze.

== First stage ==
=== Group A ===
| Pl | Team | Pld | W | L | PF | PA |
|---|---|---|---|---|---|---|
| 1 | Soviet Union | 3 | 3 | 0 | 328 | 194 |
| 2 | France | 3 | 2 | 1 | 205 | 238 |
| 3 | Romania | 3 | 1 | 2 | 206 | 227 |
| 4 | West Germany | 3 | 0 | 3 | 167 | 247 |

| May 20 | Romania | 69–56 | West Germany |
| May 20 | Soviet Union | 111–73 | France |
| May 21 | Soviet Union | 120–57 | West Germany |
| May 21 | France | 74–73 | Romania |
| May 22 | France | 58–54 | West Germany |
| May 22 | Soviet Union | 97–64 | Romania |

=== Group B ===
| Pl | Team | Pld | W | L | PF | PA |
|---|---|---|---|---|---|---|
| 1 | Hungary | 3 | 3 | 0 | 220 | 207 |
| 2 | Bulgaria | 3 | 2 | 1 | 253 | 193 |
| 3 | Italy | 3 | 1 | 2 | 182 | 214 |
| 4 | Spain | 3 | 0 | 3 | 194 | 235 |

| May 20 | Italy | 66–61 | Spain |
| May 20 | Hungary | 77–74 | Bulgaria |
| May 21 | Bulgaria | 90–61 | Spain |
| May 21 | Hungary | 64–61 | Italy |
| May 22 | Hungary | 79–72 | Spain |
| May 22 | Bulgaria | 89–55 | Italy |

=== Group C ===
| Pl | Team | Pld | W | L | PF | PA |
|---|---|---|---|---|---|---|
| 1 | (Socialist Federal Republic of Yugoslavia) Yugoslavia | 3 | 3 | 0 | 249 | 196 |
| 2 | (Czech Republic) Czechoslovakia | 3 | 2 | 1 | 209 | 179 |
| 3 | Netherlands | 3 | 1 | 2 | 184 | 196 |
| 4 | Sweden | 3 | 0 | 3 | 186 | 257 |

| May 20 | Czechoslovakia (Czech Republic) | 62–45 | Netherlands |
| May 20 | Yugoslavia (Socialist Federal Republic of Yugoslavia) | 99–68 | Sweden |
| May 21 | Czechoslovakia (Czech Republic) | 83–53 | Sweden |
| May 21 | Yugoslavia (Socialist Federal Republic of Yugoslavia) | 69–64 | Netherlands |
| May 22 | Netherlands | 75–65 | Sweden |
| May 22 | Yugoslavia (Socialist Federal Republic of Yugoslavia) | 81–64 | (Czech Republic) Czechoslovakia |

== Second stage ==
=== Championship Group ===
| Pl | Team | Pld | W | L | PF | PA |
|---|---|---|---|---|---|---|
| 1 | Soviet Union | 6 | 6 | 0 | 606 | 413 |
| 2 | (Socialist Federal Republic of Yugoslavia) Yugoslavia | 6 | 4 | 2 | 460 | 481 |
| 3 | (Czech Republic) Czechoslovakia | 6 | 4 | 2 | 454 | 442 |
| 4 | France | 6 | 3 | 3 | 436 | 464 |
| 5 | Poland | 6 | 2 | 4 | 403 | 439 |
| 6 | Hungary | 6 | 1 | 5 | 432 | 507 |
| 7 | Bulgaria | 6 | 1 | 5 | 460 | 505 |

| May 24 | Czechoslovakia (Czech Republic) | 80–60 | Hungary |
| May 24 | France | 73–70 | Poland |
| May 24 | Soviet Union | 89–63 | Bulgaria |
| May 25 | France | 77–63 | Bulgaria |
| May 25 | Czechoslovakia (Czech Republic) | 77–64 | Poland |
| May 25 | Soviet Union | 116–78 | (Socialist Federal Republic of Yugoslavia) Yugoslavia |
| May 26 | Soviet Union | 92–70 | (Czech Republic) Czechoslovakia |
| May 26 | Bulgaria | 102–76 | Poland |
| May 26 | Yugoslavia (Socialist Federal Republic of Yugoslavia) | 86–79 | Hungary |
| May 28 | Soviet Union | 79–57 | Poland |
| May 28 | France | 78–72 | Hungary |
| May 28 | Yugoslavia (Socialist Federal Republic of Yugoslavia) | 90–87 | Bulgaria |
| May 29 | Yugoslavia (Socialist Federal Republic of Yugoslavia) | 81–69 | France |
| May 29 | Poland | 70–64 | Hungary |
| May 29 | Czechoslovakia (Czech Republic) | 96–71 | Bulgaria |
| May 30 | Czechoslovakia (Czech Republic) | 67–66 | France |
| May 30 | Soviet Union | 119–72 | Hungary |
| May 30 | Poland | 66–44 | (Socialist Federal Republic of Yugoslavia) Yugoslavia |

1978 FIBA European Women's Basketball Championship champion

Soviet Union
Fourteenth title

=== 8th to 13th Group ===
| Pl | Team | Pld | W | L | PF | PA |
|---|---|---|---|---|---|---|
| 1 | Romania | 5 | 5 | 0 | 358 | 315 |
| 2 | Italy | 5 | 3 | 2 | 378 | 324 |
| 3 | Netherlands | 5 | 3 | 2 | 327 | 326 |
| 4 | Spain | 6 | 2 | 3 | 347 | 327 |
| 5 | West Germany | 6 | 2 | 3 | 307 | 311 |
| 6 | Sweden | 6 | 0 | 5 | 307 | 421 |

| May 24 | West Germany | 75–58 | Sweden |
| May 24 | Romania | 64–63 | Spain |
| May 25 | Romania | 82–58 | Sweden |
| May 25 | Italy | 79–61 | Netherlands |
| May 26 | West Germany | 66–62 | Italy |
| May 26 | Netherlands | 71–65 | Spain |
| May 28 | Romania | 71–69 | Netherlands |
| May 28 | Italy | 102–64 | Sweden |
| May 29 | Spain | 71–64 | West Germany |
| May 29 | Romania | 72–69 | Italy |
| May 30 | Netherlands | 51–46 | West Germany |
| May 30 | Spain | 87–62 | Sweden |

== Final standings ==
| Place | Team | PE |
|---|---|---|
| Gold medal | Soviet Union | Same position |
| Silver medal | (Socialist Federal Republic of Yugoslavia) Yugoslavia | ▲3 |
| Bronze medal | (Czech Republic) Czechoslovakia | ▼1 |
| 4 | France | Same position |
| 5 | Poland | ▲1 |
| 6 | Hungary | ▲2 |
| 7 | Bulgaria | ▼4 |
| 8 | Romania | ▲1 |
| 9 | Italy | ▼2 |
| 10 | Netherlands | ▲1 |
| 11 | Spain | ▼1 |
| 12 | West Germany | ▲1 |
| 13 | Sweden | New entry |
