= EuroBasket Women 1987 =

EuroBasket 1987 Women
21st FIBA European Women's Basketball Championship

Tournament details
- Host country: Spain
- Dates: 4–11 September
- Teams: 12

Final positions
- Champions: Soviet Union (19th title)

Official website
- Official website (archive)

The 1987 European Women Basketball Championship, commonly called EuroBasket Women 1987, was the 21st regional championship held by FIBA Europe. The competition was held in Spain and took place from 4 September to 11 September 1987. Soviet Union won the gold medal and Yugoslavia the silver medal while Hungary won the bronze.

== First stage ==
=== Group A ===
Pl	Team	Pld	W	L	PF	PA
1	Soviet Union	5	5	0	545	294
2	Hungary	5	4	1	448	391
3	Sweden	5	2	3	380	475
4	France	5	2	3	336	402
5	Poland	5	1	4	371	416
6	Romania	5	0	5	311	413

September 4	Hungary	82–71	France
September 4	Romania	77–76	Sweden
September 4	Soviet Union	95–62	Poland
September 5	Sweden	83–78	France
September 5	Soviet Union	95–52	Romania
September 5	Hungary	103–83	Poland
September 6	France	72–63	Romania
September 6	Sweden	84–81	Poland
September 6	Soviet Union	110–70	Hungary
September 7	Poland	80–66	Romania
September 7	Hungary	103–74	Sweden
September 7	Soviet Union	109–47	France
September 8	Soviet Union	136–63	Sweden
September 8	France	68–65	Poland
September 8	Hungary	90–53	Romania

=== Group B ===
Pl	Team	Pld	W	L	PF	PA
1	(Socialist Federal Republic of Yugoslavia) Yugoslavia	5	5	0	364	328
2	(Czech Republic) Czechoslovakia	5	4	1	408	315
3	Italy	5	2	3	370	387
4	Spain	5	2	3	336	311
5	Bulgaria	5	2	3	403	405
6	Finland	5	0	5	305	440

September 4	Yugoslavia (Socialist Federal Republic of Yugoslavia)	73–65	Italy
September 4	Spain	74–45	Finland
September 4	Czechoslovakia (Czech Republic)	95–76	Bulgaria
September 5	Yugoslavia (Socialist Federal Republic of Yugoslavia)	73–71	Bulgaria
September 5	Czechoslovakia (Czech Republic)	49–47	Spain
September 5	Italy	87–69	Finland
September 6	Yugoslavia (Socialist Federal Republic of Yugoslavia)	60–58	Spain
September 6	Czechoslovakia (Czech Republic)	100–55	Finland
September 6	Italy	85–74	Bulgaria
September 7	Czechoslovakia (Czech Republic)	88–60	Italy
September 7	Bulgaria	84–74	Spain
September 7	Yugoslavia (Socialist Federal Republic of Yugoslavia)	81–58	Finland
September 8	Bulgaria	98–78	Finland
September 8	Spain	83–73	Italy
September 8	Yugoslavia (Socialist Federal Republic of Yugoslavia)	77–76	(Czech Republic) Czechoslovakia

== Play-off stages ==
Semifinals
September 10
Soviet Union	89
(Czech Republic) Czechoslovakia	81
September 10
(Socialist Federal Republic of Yugoslavia) Yugoslavia	72
Hungary	71

Final
September 11
Soviet Union	83
(Socialist Federal Republic of Yugoslavia) Yugoslavia	73
Third place
September 11
(Czech Republic) Czechoslovakia	67
Hungary	75

9th to 12th places
September 10	Poland	93–64	Finland
September 10	Bulgaria	106–71	Romania
5th to 8th places
September 10	Spain	92–76	Sweden
September 10	Italy	81–65	France
11th place
September 11	Romania	65–64	Finland
9th place
September 11	Bulgaria	81–80	Poland
7th place
September 11	Sweden	70–54	France
5th place
September 11	Italy	102–87	Spain

1987 FIBA European Women's Basketball Championship champion

Soviet Union
Nineteenth title

== Final standings ==
Place	Team	PE
Gold medal	Soviet Union	Same position
Silver medal	(Socialist Federal Republic of Yugoslavia) Yugoslavia	▲3
Bronze medal	Hungary	Same position
4	(Czech Republic) Czechoslovakia	Same position
5	Italy	▲2
6	Spain	▲4
7	Sweden	New entry
8	France	Same position
9	Bulgaria	▼7
10	Poland	▼4
11	Romania	▼2
12	Finland	New entry
