= EuroBasket Women 1980 =

EuroBasket 1980 Women
17th FIBA European Women's Basketball Championship

Tournament details
- Host country: SFR Yugoslavia
- Dates: 19–28 September
- Teams: 14

Final positions
- Champions: Soviet Union (15th title)

Official website
- Official website (archive)

The 1980 European Women Basketball Championship, commonly called EuroBasket Women 1980, was the 17th regional championship held by FIBA Europe. The competition was held in Yugoslavia and took place from 19 September to 28 September 1980. Soviet Union won the gold medal while won Poland the silver medal and Yugoslavia won the bronze medal.

== Qualification ==
=== Group A ===
Pl	Team	Pld	W	L	PF	PA
1	Spain	3	3	0	249	194
2	England	3	2	1	209	227
3	Israel	3	1	2	206	224
4	West Germany	3	0	3	172	191

April 4	Israel	64–62	West Germany
April 4	Spain	103–66	England
April 5	England	64–61	West Germany
April 5	Spain	83–79	Israel
April 6	England	79–63	Israel
April 6	Spain	63–49	West Germany

=== Group B ===
Pl	Team	Pld	W	L	PF	PA
1	Finland	5	5	0	464	279
2	Belgium	5	4	1	394	334
3	Sweden	5	3	2	404	305
4	Scotland	5	2	3	286	389
5	Denmark	5	1	4	260	369
6	(Republic of Ireland) Ireland	5	0	5	319	448

April 8	Sweden	100–46	Denmark
April 8	Finland	91–54	Scotland
April 9	Sweden	76–63	(Republic of Ireland) Ireland
April 9	Denmark	72–63	(Republic of Ireland) Ireland
April 9	Finland	94–59	Belgium
April 10	Belgium	66–38	Denmark
April 10	Finland	118–54	(Republic of Ireland) Ireland
April 11	Belgium	75–70	Sweden
April 11	Scotland	75–64	(Republic of Ireland) Ireland
April 12	Belgium	107–75	(Republic of Ireland) Ireland
April 12	Finland	83–70	Sweden
April 12	Scotland	61–59	Denmark
April 13	Belgium	87–57	Scotland
April 13	Finland	78–42	Denmark
April 8	Sweden	88–39	Scotland

== First stage ==
=== Group A ===
Pl	Team	Pld	W	L	PF	PA
1	Hungary	3	3	0	227	164
2	Poland	3	2	1	217	207
3	Italy	3	1	2	195	172
4	England	3	0	3	134	230

September 19	Poland	80–56	England
September 19	Hungary	62–59	Italy
September 20	Hungary	77–37	England
September 20	Poland	69–63	Italy
September 21	Italy	74–41	England
September 21	Hungary	88–68	Poland

=== Group B ===
Pl	Team	Pld	W	L	PF	PA
1	Netherlands	3	3	0	196	157
2	Romania	3	2	1	197	186
3	France	3	1	2	176	186
4	Finland	3	0	3	186	226

September 19	Netherlands	53–49	France
September 19	Romania	78–64	Finland
September 20	Netherlands	71–53	Romania
September 20	France	76–67	Finland
September 21	Netherlands	72–55	Finland
September 21	Romania	66–51	France

=== Group C ===
Pl	Team	Pld	W	L	PF	PA
1	(Czech Republic) Czechoslovakia	3	3	0	271	169
2	Bulgaria	3	2	1	241	180
3	Spain	3	1	2	200	244
4	Belgium	3	0	3	173	292

September 19	Czechoslovakia (Czech Republic)	110–45	Belgium
September 19	Bulgaria	88–47	Spain
September 20	Spain	88–67	Belgium
September 20	Czechoslovakia (Czech Republic)	72–59	Bulgaria
September 21	Bulgaria	94–61	Belgium
September 21	Czechoslovakia (Czech Republic)	89–65	Spain

== Second stage ==
=== Group A ===
Pl	Team	Pld	W	L	PF	PA
1	Soviet Union	3	3	0	318	146
2	Poland	3	2	1	187	205
3	Netherlands	3	1	2	171	257
4	Bulgaria	3	0	3	210	278

September 23	Poland	76–66	Bulgaria
September 23	Soviet Union	105–43	Netherlands
September 24	Netherlands	83–81	Bulgaria
September 24	Soviet Union	94–40	Poland
September 25	Soviet Union	119–63	Bulgaria
September 25	Poland	71–45	Netherlands

=== Group B ===
Pl	Team	Pld	W	L	PF	PA
1	(Socialist Federal Republic of Yugoslavia) Yugoslavia	3	2	1	217	199
2	(Czech Republic) Czechoslovakia	3	2	1	222	211
3	Romania	3	1	2	183	215
4	Hungary	3	1	2	208	206

September 23	Czechoslovakia (Czech Republic)	78–61	Romania
September 23	Hungary	79–59	(Socialist Federal Republic of Yugoslavia) Yugoslavia
September 24	Yugoslavia (Socialist Federal Republic of Yugoslavia)	80–67	(Czech Republic) Czechoslovakia
September 24	Romania	69–59	Hungary
September 25	Yugoslavia (Socialist Federal Republic of Yugoslavia)	78–53	Romania
September 25	Czechoslovakia (Czech Republic)	77–70	Hungary

=== 9th to 14th positions Group ===
Pl	Team	Pld	W	L	PF	PA
1	Italy	5	5	0	370	240
2	Spain	5	4	1	379	310
3	France	5	3	2	311	322
4	Finland	5	2	3	359	357
5	Belgium	5	1	4	280	376
6	England	5	0	5	281	369

September 23	Spain	84–71	Finland
September 23	Belgium	62–56	England
September 23	Italy	64–46	France
September 24	France	66–49	Belgium
September 24	Italy	80–44	Finland
September 24	Spain	76–43	England
September 25	France	68–67	England
September 25	Italy	74–56	Spain
September 25	Finland	87–43	Belgium
September 27	Finland	90–74	England
September 27	Italy	79–59	Belgium
September 27	Spain	75–55	France

== Play-off stages ==
Semifinals
September 27
Soviet Union	94
(Czech Republic) Czechoslovakia	62
September 27
(Socialist Federal Republic of Yugoslavia) Yugoslavia	72
Poland	79

Final
September 28
Soviet Union	95
Poland	49
Third place
September 28
(Czech Republic) Czechoslovakia	57
(Socialist Federal Republic of Yugoslavia) Yugoslavia	61

5th to 8th places
September 27	Netherlands	64–61	Hungary
September 27	Bulgaria	60–52	Romania
7th place
September 28	Hungary	81–71	Romania
5th place
September 28	Bulgaria	71–38	Netherlands

1980 FIBA European Women's Basketball Championship champion

Soviet Union
Fifteenth title

== Final standings ==
Place	Team	PE
Gold medal	Soviet Union	Same position
Silver medal	Poland	▲3
Bronze medal	(Socialist Federal Republic of Yugoslavia) Yugoslavia	▼1
4	(Czech Republic) Czechoslovakia	▼1
5	Bulgaria	▲2
6	Netherlands	▲4
7	Hungary	▼1
8	Romania	Same position
9	Italy	Same position
10	Spain	▲1
11	France	▼7
12	Finland	New entry
13	Belgium	New entry
14	England	New entry
