= EuroBasket Women 2009 squads =

== Group A ==
=== Czech Republic ===
Czech Republic Women's National Basketball Team roster
Players
Coaches

Pos.	No.	Name	Age – Date of birth	Height	Club
F	4	Jana Veselá	25 – 31 December 1983	1.90 m (6 ft 3 in)	Ros Casares Valencia	(Spain)
F/C	5	Petra Maňáková	27 – 29 May 1982	1.92 m (6 ft 4 in)	TV Saarlouis Royals	(Germany)
PG	6	Kateřina Bartoňová	19 – 17 January 1990	1.71 m (5 ft 7 in)	ZVVZ UŠK Prague	(Czech Republic)
G/F	7	Irena Borecká	28 – 5 November 1980	1.72 m (5 ft 8 in)	BK Lokomotiva Karlovy Vary	(Czech Republic)
SF	8	Kateřina Zohnová	24 – 7 November 1984	1.79 m (5 ft 10 in)	AZS PWSZ Gorzów Wielkopolski	(Poland)
C	9	Michaela Hartigová	25 – 14 November 1983	1.92 m (6 ft 4 in)	Kara Trutnov	(Czech Republic)
C	10	Martina Rejchová	26 – 2 April 1983	1.95 m (6 ft 5 in)	ESB Villeneuve-d’Ascq	(France)
SF	11	Tereza Pecková	21 – 10 July 1987	1.87 m (6 ft 2 in)	ZVVZ USK Prague	(Czech Republic)
SG	12	Markéta Bednářová	28 – 17 April 1981	1.77 m (5 ft 10 in)	ZVVZ USK Prague	(Czech Republic)
C	13	Petra Kulichová	24 – 13 September 1984	1.97 m (6 ft 6 in)	Gambrinus Brno	(Czech Republic)
PG	14	Katěrina Elhotova	19 – 14 October 1989	1.76 m (5 ft 9 in)	ZVVZ USK Prague	(Czech Republic)
PF	15	Eva Vítečková	27 – 26 January 1982	1.89 m (6 ft 2 in)	Gambrinus Brno	(Czech Republic)

Head coach

- (Czech Republic) Milan Veverka

Legend

- (C) Team captain
- nat field describes country
  of last club
  before the tournament
- Age field is age on June 7, 2009

=== Spain ===
Spain Women's National Basketball Team roster
Players
Coaches

Pos.	No.	Name	Age – Date of birth	Height	Club
C	4	Laura Nicholls	20 – 26 February 1989	1.89 m (6 ft 2 in)	Celta Vigourban	(Spain)
F/C	5	Cindy Lima	27 – 21 June 1981	1.96 m (6 ft 5 in)	CB San José	(Spain)
G	6	Silvia Dominguez	22 – 31 January 1987	1.67 m (5 ft 6 in)	Perfumerías Avenida Salamanca	(Spain)
F	7	Isabel Sanchez	32 – 28 November 1976	1.80 m (5 ft 11 in)	Perfumerías Avenida Salamanca	(Spain)
C	8	Lucila Pascua	26 – 21 March 1983	1.95 m (6 ft 5 in)	CB San José	(Spain)
G	9	Laia Palau	29 – 10 September 1979	1.78 m (5 ft 10 in)	Ros Casares Valencia	(Spain)
G	10	Elisa Aguilar	32 – 15 October 1976	1.72 m (5 ft 8 in)	Ros Casares Valencia	(Spain)
F	11	Tamara Abalde	20 – 6 February 1989	1.88 m (6 ft 2 in)	Rivas Futura	(Spain)
F	12	Anna Montañana	28 – 24 October 1980	1.86 m (6 ft 1 in)	Ros Casares Valencia	(Spain)
F	13	Amaya Valdemoro	32 – 18 August 1976	1.83 m (6 ft 0 in)	Ros Casares Valencia	(Spain)
F	14	Anna Cruz	22 – 27 October 1986	1.72 m (5 ft 8 in)	CB Olesa-Espanyol	(Spain)
F	15	Alba Torrens	19 – 30 August 1989	1.84 m (6 ft 0 in)	Celta Vigourban	(Spain)

Head coach

- (Spain) Evaristo Perez

Legend

- (C) Team captain
- nat field describes country
  of last club
  before the tournament
- Age field is age on June 7, 2009

=== Slovakia ===
Slovak Republic Women's National Basketball Team roster
Players
Coaches

Pos.	No.	Name	Age – Date of birth	Height	Club
PG	4	Bronislava Borovičková	29 – 21 February 1980	1.70 m (5 ft 7 in)	Seat Foton Győr	(Hungary)
PF	5	Katarína Tetemondová	20 – 24 September 1988	1.85 m (6 ft 1 in)	ŽBK Whirlpool Poprad	(Slovakia)
SF	6	Lucia Kupčíková	24 – 28 August 1984	1.84 m (6 ft 0 in)	MBK Ružomberok	(Slovakia)
G	7	Zuzana Žirková	29 – 6 June 1980	1.75 m (5 ft 9 in)	Gambrinus Brno	(Czech Republic)
SG	8	Jana Čarnoká	22 – 18 March 1987	1.74 m (5 ft 9 in)	Maxima Broker Košice	(Slovakia)
C	9	Romana Vyňuchalová	22 – 3 September 1986	1.92 m (6 ft 4 in)	Flying Foxes Post SV Wien	(Austria)
C	10	Regina Palušná	20 – 6 June 1989	1.92 m (6 ft 4 in)	Ros Casares Valencia	(Spain)
F	11	Ivana Jalčová	25 – 25 October 1983	1.83 m (6 ft 0 in)	Maxima Broker Košice	(Slovakia)
F/C	12	Lucia Lásková	28 – 26 August 1980	1.87 m (6 ft 2 in)	Roche Vendée Basket	(France)
C	13	Anna Jurčenková	23 – 26 July 1985	1.95 m (6 ft 5 in)	Maxima Broker Košice	(Slovakia)
SF	14	Katarína Hricková	29 – 12 May 1980	1.81 m (5 ft 11 in)	Maxima Broker Košice	(Slovakia)
F	15	Martina Gyurcsi	31 – 15 November 1977	1.84 m (6 ft 0 in)	Challes-les-Eaux Basket	(France)

Head coach

- (United States) Pokey Chatman

Legend

- (C) Team captain
- nat field describes country
  of last club
  before the tournament
- Age field is age on June 7, 2009

=== Ukraine ===
Ukraine Women's National Basketball Team roster
Players
Coaches

Pos.	No.	Name	Age – Date of birth	Height	Club
SG	4	Iryna Biryuk	30 – 27 June 1978	1.75 m (5 ft 9 in)	Kozachka-ZALK Zaporozhye	(Ukraine)
G	5	Yevgeniya Sharovka	21 – 10 May 1988	1.75 m (5 ft 9 in)	Tim-Scuf Kyiv	(Ukraine)
SG	6	Tetyana Shchypakina	23 – 17 November 1985	1.78 m (5 ft 10 in)	Arvi Marijampolė	(Lithuania)
PG	7	Inna Kochubei	27 – 5 April 1982	1.73 m (5 ft 8 in)	Tim-Scuf Kyiv	(Ukraine)
C	8	Valeriya Berezhynska	23 – 10 April 1986	1.93 m (6 ft 4 in)	Saint Jacques Sport Reims	(France)
SF	9	Olexandra Gorbunova	23 – 4 April 1986	1.86 m (6 ft 1 in)	ŽBK CSKA Moscow	(Russia)
F	10	Olesia Malashenko	18 – 21 February 1991	1.88 m (6 ft 2 in)	Dexia Namur	(Belgium)
PG	11	Olga Dubrovina	22 – 2 May 1987	1.70 m (5 ft 7 in)	Szeviép Szeged	(Hungary)
C	12	Lyubov Alyoshkina	27 – 23 August 1981	2.01 m (6 ft 7 in)	MBK Ružomberok	(Slovakia)
F	13	Olha Krasnikova	25 – 26 January 1984	1.82 m (6 ft 0 in)	Tim-Scuf Kyiv	(Ukraine)
PF	14	Olena Ogorodnikova	28 – 30 May 1981	1.86 m (6 ft 1 in)	Elizur Ramla	(Israel)
C	15	Olena Zherzherunova	31 – 25 May 1978	1.91 m (6 ft 3 in)	Szeviép Szeged	(Hungary)

Head coach

- (Ukraine) Volodymyr Bryukhovestskyy

Legend

- (C) Team captain
- nat field describes country
  of last club
  before the tournament
- Age field is age on June 7, 2009

== Group B ==
=== Greece ===
Greece Women's National Basketball Team roster
Players
Coaches

Pos.	No.	Name	Age – Date of birth	Height	Club
G	4	Dimitra Kalentzou	31 – 3 January 1978	1.74 m (5 ft 9 in)	Esperides Kallitheas	(Greece)
SG	5	Evdokia Stamati	24 – 2 August 1984	1.78 m (5 ft 10 in)	Panathinaikos	(Greece)
SF	6	Zoi Dimitrakou	22 – 25 May 1987	1.88 m (6 ft 2 in)	Megas Aleksandros	(Greece)
G/F	7	Olga Chatzinikolaou	27 – 4 July 1981	1.81 m (5 ft 11 in)	Esperides Kallitheas	(Greece)
F	8	Styliani Kaltsidou	26 – 12 January 1983	1.88 m (6 ft 2 in)	Esperides Kallitheas	(Greece)
F	9	Evanthia Maltsi	30 – 30 December 1978	1.80 m (5 ft 11 in)	ZVVZ USK Praha	(Czech Republic)
PF	10	Pelagia Papamichail	23 – 29 April 1986	1.92 m (6 ft 4 in)	Panionios	(Greece)
PG	11	Lolita Limoura	24 – 10 March 1985	1.80 m (5 ft 11 in)	Pool Comense	(Italy)
SF	12	Katerina Sotiriou	25 – 3 January 1984	1.86 m (6 ft 1 in)	Esperides Kallitheas	(Greece)
F	13	Afroditi Kosma	26 – 6 June 1983	1.87 m (6 ft 2 in)	Athinaikos	(Greece)
C	14	Maria Zikiridou	27 – 12 January 1982	1.86 m (6 ft 1 in)	Panathinaikos	(Greece)
C	15	Effrosyni Vlachou	27 – 19 March 1982	1.92 m (6 ft 4 in)	Pabellon Ourense	(Spain)

Head coach

- (Greece) Konstantinos Missas

Legend

- (C) Team captain
- nat field describes country
  of last club
  before the tournament
- Age field is age on June 7, 2009

=== Hungary ===
Hungary Women's National Basketball Team roster
Players
Coaches

Pos.	No.	Name	Age – Date of birth	Height	Club
PG	4	Zsófia Fegyverneky	24 – 29 September 1984	1.76 m (5 ft 9 in)	Gambrinus Sika Brno	(Czech Republic)
PG	5	Orsolya Englert	28 – 23 August 1980	1.70 m (5 ft 7 in)	SJS Reims	(France)
PG	6	Bernadett Németh	29 – 31 March 1980	1.73 m (5 ft 8 in)	Szeviép Szeged	(Hungary)
C	7	Petra Ujhelyi	28 – 17 December 1980	1.92 m (6 ft 4 in)	Rivasecópolis	(Spain)
PG	8	Diána Fűrész	25 – 15 January 1984	1.73 m (5 ft 8 in)	Seat Foton Győr	(Hungary)
C	9	Dóra Horti	22 – 25 April 1987	1.95 m (6 ft 5 in)	MKB Euroleasing Sopron	(Hungary)
F	10	Zsuzsanna Horváth	25 – 3 August 1983	1.87 m (6 ft 2 in)	MKB Euroleasing Sopron	(Hungary)
SG	11	Katalin Honti	21 – 24 August 1987	1.75 m (5 ft 9 in)	MKB Euroleasing Sopron	(Hungary)
F	12	Anna Vida	24 – 21 May 1985	1.84 m (6 ft 0 in)	Seat Foton Győr	(Hungary)
PF	13	Anna Vajda	24 – 3 September 1984	1.90 m (6 ft 3 in)	MiZo Pécs 2010	(Hungary)
PF	14	Tijana Krivacsevics	19 – 8 April 1990	1.94 m (6 ft 4 in)	MKB Euroleasing Sopron	(Hungary)
PF	15	Nóra Bujdosó	23 – 18 November 1985	1.85 m (6 ft 1 in)	CJM Bourges	(France)

Head coach

- (Hungary) László Rátgéber

Legend

- (C) Team captain
- nat field describes country
  of last club
  before the tournament
- Age field is age on June 7, 2009

=== Latvia ===
Latvia Women's National Basketball Team roster
Players
Coaches

Pos.	No.	Name	Age – Date of birth	Height	Club
F	4	Sabīne Niedola	18 – 29 April 1991	1.84 m (6 ft 0 in)	Liepājas Metalurgs	(Latvia)
G	5	Anda Eibele	24 – 30 July 1984	1.70 m (5 ft 7 in)	SK Cēsis	(Latvia)
G	6	Zane Eglīte	24 – 10 December 1984	1.70 m (5 ft 7 in)	TTT Rīga	(Latvia)
C	7	Zane Tamane	25 – 24 September 1983	2.00 m (6 ft 7 in)	Nadezhda Orenburg	(Russia)
SG	8	Gunta Baško	29 – 27 April 1980	1.81 m (5 ft 11 in)	Halcon Avenida	(Spain)
PF	9	Liene Jansone	28 – 22 May 1981	1.92 m (6 ft 4 in)	Tarbes Gespe Bigorre	(France)
F	10	Anete Jēkabsone-Žogota	25 – 12 August 1983	1.76 m (5 ft 9 in)	Dynamo Moscow	(Russia)
C	11	Aija Putniņa	21 – 15 January 1988	1.92 m (6 ft 4 in)	CB Olesa-Espanyol	(Spain)
SG	12	Dita Krūmberga	25 – 20 March 1984	1.82 m (6 ft 0 in)	TTT Rīga	(Latvia)
F	13	Ieva Tāre	35 – 15 March 1974	1.85 m (6 ft 1 in)	SK Cēsis	(Latvia)
PG	14	Kristīne Kārkliņa	25 – 30 September 1983	1.75 m (5 ft 9 in)	SK Cēsis	(Latvia)
C	15	Aija Brumermane	22 – 17 October 1986	1.91 m (6 ft 3 in)	TTT Rīga	(Latvia)

Head coach

- (Latvia) Ainārs Zvirgzdiņš

Legend

- (C) Team captain
- nat field describes country
  of last club
  before the tournament
- Age field is age on June 7, 2009

=== Poland ===
Poland Women's National Basketball Team roster
Players
Coaches

Pos.	No.	Name	Age – Date of birth	Height	Club
F	4	Aleksandra Drzewińska	25 – 22 November 1983	1.78 m (5 ft 10 in)	AZS Poznań	(Poland)
F	5	Justyna Żurowska	24 – 8 March 1985	1.88 m (6 ft 2 in)	AZS PWSZ Gorzów Wielkopolski	(Poland)
PF	6	Daria Mieloszyńska	25 – 24 November 1983	1.88 m (6 ft 2 in)	CCC Polkowice)	(Poland)
PG	7	Agata Gajda	28 – 29 August 1980	1.74 m (5 ft 9 in)	CCC Polkowice	(Poland)
PG	8	Paulina Pawlak	24 – 1 July 1984	1.70 m (5 ft 7 in)	Lotos VBW Clima Gdynia	(Poland)
F	9	Agnieszka Bibrzycka	26 – 21 October 1982	1.84 m (6 ft 0 in)	UMMC Ekaterinburg	(Russia)
PF	10	Joanna Walich	27 – 27 October 1981	1.83 m (6 ft 0 in)	AZS Poznań	(Poland)
F	11	Agnieszka Skobel	20 – 16 January 1989	1.81 m (5 ft 11 in)	AZS Poznań	(Poland)
G	12	Justyna Jeziorna	27 – 7 September 1981	1.73 m (5 ft 8 in)	CCC Polkowice	(Poland)
C	13	Ewelina Kobryn	27 – 7 May 1982	1.93 m (6 ft 4 in)	TS Wisła Can-Pack Kraków	(Poland)
C	14	Izabela Piekarska	23 – 8 June 1985	1.96 m (6 ft 5 in)	Ceyhan Belediyespor	(Turkey)
PF	15	Magdalena Leciejewska	22 – 29 June 1986	1.91 m (6 ft 3 in)	Lotos VBW Clima Gdynia	(Poland)

Head coach

- (Poland) Krzysztof Koziorowicz

Legend

- (C) Team captain
- nat field describes country
  of last club
  before the tournament
- Age field is age on June 7, 2009

== Group C ==
=== Lithuania ===
Lithuania Women's National Basketball Team roster
Players
Coaches

Pos.	No.	Name	Age – Date of birth	Height	Club
G	4	Eglė Žygelytė	25 – 11 May 1984	1.66 m (5 ft 5 in)	Lemminkainen Klaipeda	(Lithuania)
G	5	Milda Sauliūtė	27 – 28 August 1981	1.75 m (5 ft 9 in)	Arvi Marijampolė	(Lithuania)
G	6	Vaida Pacauskienė	30 – 23 May 1979	1.76 m (5 ft 9 in)	Arvi Marijampolė	(Lithuania)
SG	7	Aušra Bimbaitė	26 – 10 October 1982	1.79 m (5 ft 10 in)	TEO Vilnius	(Lithuania)
C	8	Agnė Čiūdarienė	30 – 15 January 1979	1.90 m (6 ft 3 in)	Celta Vigourban	(Spain)
PG	9	Rima Valentienė	30 – 10 June 1978	1.70 m (5 ft 7 in)	TEO Vilnius	(Lithuania)
G	10	Daina Staugaitienė	28 – 8 August 1980	1.82 m (6 ft 0 in)	TEO Vilnius	(Lithuania)
C	11	Gintarė Petronytė	20 – 19 March 1989	1.95 m (6 ft 5 in)	TEO Vilnius	(Lithuania)
C	12	Giedrė Paugaitė	18 – 15 July 1990	1.92 m (6 ft 4 in)	Arvi Marijampolė	(Lithuania)
PG	13	Sandra Valužytė	27 – 1 February 1982	1.76 m (5 ft 9 in)	Dynamo Kursk	(Russia)
PF	14	Eglė Staknevičienė	23 – 31 August 1985	1.90 m (6 ft 3 in)	Club Atletico Faenza	(Italy)
PF	15	Laima Rickevičiūtė	21 – 18 May 1988	1.88 m (6 ft 2 in)	Arvi Marijampolė	(Lithuania)

Head coach

- (Lithuania) Rūtenis Paulauskas

Legend

- (C) Team captain
- nat field describes country
  of last club
  before the tournament
- Age field is age on June 7, 2009

=== Russia ===
Russia Women's National Basketball Team roster
Players
Coaches

Pos.	No.	Name	Age – Date of birth	Height	Club
F	4	Olga Arteshina	26 – 27 November 1982	1.82 m (6 ft 0 in)	CSKA Moscow	(Russia)
G	5	Becky Hammon	32 – 11 March 1977	1.68 m (5 ft 6 in)	CSKA Moscow	(Russia)
C	6	Marina Kuzina	23 – 19 July 1985	1.95 m (6 ft 5 in)	Dynamo Moscow	(Russia)
SG	7	Elena Volkova	26 – 9 April 1983	1.76 m (5 ft 9 in)	Vologda-Chevakata	(Russia)
SG	8	Marina Karpunina	25 – 21 March 1984	1.78 m (5 ft 10 in)	Spartak Moscow	(Russia)
PG	9	Tatiana Shchegoleva	27 – 9 February 1982	1.92 m (6 ft 4 in)	Spartak Moscow	(Russia)
SG	10	Ilona Korstin	29 – 30 May 1980	1.83 m (6 ft 0 in)	CSKA Moscow	(Russia)
C	11	Maria Stepanova	30 – 23 February 1979	2.03 m (6 ft 8 in)	UMMC Ekaterinburg	(Russia)
C	12	Yekaterina Lisina	21 – 15 October 1987	1.98 m (6 ft 6 in)	CSKA Moscow	(Russia)
SF	13	Tatiana Popova	24 – 17 September 1984	1.81 m (5 ft 11 in)	Dynamo Moscow	(Russia)
F	14	Svetlana Abrosimova	28 – 9 July 1980	1.85 m (6 ft 1 in)	UMMC Ekaterinburg	(Russia)
PF	15	Irina Osipova	27 – 25 June 1981	1.96 m (6 ft 5 in)	Spartak Moscow	(Russia)

Head coach

- (Russia) Valery Tikhonenko

Legend

- (C) Team captain
- nat field describes country
  of last club
  before the tournament
- Age field is age on June 7, 2009

=== Serbia ===
Serbian Women's National Basketball Team roster
Players
Coaches

Pos.	No.	Name	Age – Date of birth	Height	Club
PG	4	Marija Erić	26 – 2 May 1983	1.64 m (5 ft 5 in)	Napoli	(Italy)
SF	5	Sonja Petrović	20 – 18 February 1989	1.89 m (6 ft 2 in)	Spartak Moscow	(Russia)
PF	6	Iva Roglić	21 – 23 March 1988	1.89 m (6 ft 2 in)	Crvena zvezda	(Serbia)
PG	7	Tamara Radočaj	21 – 23 December 1987	1.68 m (5 ft 6 in)	Hemofarm Stada	(Serbia)
SG	8	Ines Kresović	25 – 20 February 1984	1.82 m (6 ft 0 in)	Gran Canaria	(Spain)
PF	9	Jelena Milovanović	20 – 28 April 1989	1.90 m (6 ft 3 in)	MKB Euroleasing Sopron	(Hungary)
PG	10	Maja Miljković	21 – 11 April 1988	1.75 m (5 ft 9 in)	Celta Vigourban	(Spain)
C	11	Ana Perović	31 – 8 July 1977	1.97 m (6 ft 6 in)	Basket Landes	(France)
C	12	Ines Ajanović	28 – 12 November 1980	1.96 m (6 ft 5 in)	Crvena zvezda	(Serbia)
PG	13	Milica Dabović	27 – 16 February 1982	1.75 m (5 ft 9 in)	Beşiktaş Cola Turka	(Turkey)
F/C	14	Marina Puškar	27 – 6 June 1982	1.94 m (6 ft 4 in)	Crvena zvezda	(Serbia)
G	15	Miljana Musović	22 – 17 May 1987	1.81 m (5 ft 11 in)	Crvena zvezda	(Serbia)

Head coach

- (Serbia) Jovica Antonić

Legend

- (C) Team captain
- nat field describes country
  of last club
  before the tournament
- Age field is age on June 7, 2009

=== Turkey ===
Turkey Women's National Basketball Team roster
Players
Coaches

Pos.	No.	Name	Age – Date of birth	Height	Club
F	4	Şaziye İvegin-Karslı	27 – 8 February 1982	1.82 m (6 ft 0 in)	Galatasaray	(Turkey)
G	5	Yasemen Saylar	18 – 7 September 1990	1.73 m (5 ft 8 in)	Galatasaray	(Turkey)
PG	6	Birsel Vardarlı	24 – 12 July 1984	1.75 m (5 ft 9 in)	Fenerbahçe İstanbul	(Turkey)
PG	7	Nilay Yiğit	30 – 13 January 1979	1.70 m (5 ft 7 in)	Panküp TED Kayseri Koleji	(Turkey)
SG	8	Tuğba Palazoğlu	28 – 4 December 1980	1.72 m (5 ft 8 in)	Galatasaray	(Turkey)
F	9	Dürdane Gümüsay	20 – 22 February 1989	1.80 m (5 ft 11 in)	Botasspor Adana	(Turkey)
SG	10	Sariye Gökçe	30 – 23 February 1979	1.78 m (5 ft 10 in)	Mersin BSH Bld	(Turkey)
C	11	Melek Bilge	20 – 23 March 1989	1.93 m (6 ft 4 in)	Beşiktaş Cola Turka	(Turkey)
F/C	12	Naile Ivegin	24 – 28 May 1985	1.85 m (6 ft 1 in)	Beşiktaş Cola Turka	(Turkey)
F/C	13	Yasemin Horasan	25 – 1 August 1983	1.87 m (6 ft 2 in)	Galatasaray	(Turkey)
C	14	Nevin Nevlin	24 – 8 May 1985	1.95 m (6 ft 5 in)	Fenerbahçe İstanbul	(Turkey)
F	15	Bahar Çağlar	20 – 28 September 1988	1.88 m (6 ft 2 in)	Galatasaray	(Turkey)

Head coach

- (Turkey) Ceyhyn Yildizoglu

Legend

- (C) Team captain
- nat field describes country
  of last club
  before the tournament
- Age field is age on June 7, 2009

== Group D ==
=== Belarus ===
Belarus Women's National Basketball Team roster
Players
Coaches

Pos.	No.	Name	Age – Date of birth	Height	Club
PG	4	Volha Padabed	30 – 24 April 1979	1.74 m (5 ft 9 in)	Berezina Borisov	(Belarus)
G	5	Aliaksandra Tarasava	20 – 23 June 1988	1.70 m (5 ft 7 in)	BK Minsk-2006	(Belarus)
SF	6	Katsiaryna Snytsina	23 – 2 September 1985	1.88 m (6 ft 2 in)	Lotos VBW Clima Gdynia	(Poland)
F	7	Yuliya Dureika	22 – 8 September 1986	1.79 m (5 ft 10 in)	Berezina Borisov	(Belarus)
F	8	Sviatlana Volnaya	30 – 11 April 1979	1.87 m (6 ft 2 in)	Fenerbahçe İstanbul	(Turkey)
G	9	Natallia Anufryienka	23 – 11 June 1985	1.74 m (5 ft 9 in)	Olimpia Grodno	(Belarus)
C	10	Anastasiya Verameyenka	21 – 10 July 1987	1.92 m (6 ft 4 in)	Nadezhda Orenburg	(Russia)
C	11	Yelena Leuchanka	26 – 30 April 1983	1.96 m (6 ft 5 in)	UMMC Ekaterinburg	(Russia)
G	12	Natallia Marchanka	30 – 19 May 1979	1.70 m (5 ft 7 in)	Lotos VBW Clima Gdynia	(Poland)
F	13	Tatyana Troina	27 – 30 June 1981	1.88 m (6 ft 2 in)	Electra Ramat Hasharon	(Israel)
PF	14	Nataliya Trafimava	29 – 16 June 1979	1.86 m (6 ft 1 in)	Utex Row Rybnik	(Poland)
C	15	Marina Kress	28 – 23 August 1980	1.92 m (6 ft 4 in)	Galatasaray	(Turkey)

Head coach

- (Belarus) Anatoli Buyalski

Legend

- (C) Team captain
- nat field describes country
  of last club
  before the tournament
- Age field is age on June 7, 2009

=== France ===
France Women's National Basketball Team roster
Players
Coaches

Pos.	No.	Name	Age – Date of birth	Height	Club
C	4	Isabelle Yacoubou	23 – 21 April 1986	1.90 m (6 ft 3 in)	Tarbes Gespe Bigorre	(France)
PF	5	Endene Miyem	21 – 15 May 1988	1.88 m (6 ft 2 in)	CJM Bourges Basket	(France)
PF	6	Catherine Melain	35 – 19 May 1974	1.83 m (6 ft 0 in)	CJM Bourges Basket	(France)
C	7	Sandrine Gruda	21 – 25 June 1987	1.93 m (6 ft 4 in)	UMMC Ekaterinburg	(Russia)
F	8	Emmanuelle Hermouet	30 – 2 April 1979	1.83 m (6 ft 0 in)	Toulouse Metropole Basket	(France)
PG	9	Celine Dumerc	26 – 9 July 1982	1.69 m (5 ft 7 in)	CJM Bourges Basket	(France)
SF	10	Pauline Krawczyk	24 – 17 March 1985	1.80 m (5 ft 11 in)	Lattes-Maurin Montpellier	(France)
SG	11	Emilie Gomis	25 – 18 October 1983	1.80 m (5 ft 11 in)	Vomero Basket Napoli	(Italy)
PF	12	Florence Lepron	24 – 16 January 1985	1.83 m (6 ft 0 in)	ESB Villeneuve-d’Ascq	(France)
PF	13	Elodie Godin	23 – 5 July 1985	1.90 m (6 ft 3 in)	Cras Taranto	(Italy)
C	14	Emmeline Ndongue	26 – 25 April 1983	1.90 m (6 ft 3 in)	CJM Bourges Basket	(France)
PG	15	Anael Lardy	21 – 24 October 1987	1.70 m (5 ft 7 in)	Stade Clermontois BA 63	(France)

Head coach

- (France) Pierre Vincent

Legend

- (C) Team captain
- nat field describes country
  of last club
  before the tournament
- Age field is age on June 7, 2009

=== Israel ===
Israel Women's National Basketball Team roster
Players
Coaches

Pos.	No.	Name	Age – Date of birth	Height	Club
SF	4	Liad Suez-Karni	28 – 21 April 1981	1.87 m (6 ft 2 in)	Electra Ramat HaSharon	(Israel)
SF	5	Meirav Dori	23 – 25 May 1986	1.78 m (5 ft 10 in)	Electra Ramat HaSharon	(Israel)
F	6	Shimrit Gigi	29 – 9 February 1980	1.80 m (5 ft 11 in)	Bnot Hasharon	(Israel)
G	7	Liron Cohen	26 – 5 August 1982	1.73 m (5 ft 8 in)	TS Wisła Can-Pack Kraków	(Poland)
G	8	Shay Doron	24 – 1 April 1985	1.75 m (5 ft 9 in)	Maccabi Ramat Hen	(Israel)
PG	9	Shiran Zairy	23 – 18 January 1986	1.66 m (5 ft 5 in)	Maccabi Bnot Ashdod	(Israel)
G	10	Laine Selwyn	28 – 16 May 1981	1.70 m (5 ft 7 in)	Electra Ramat HaSharon	(Israel)
PG	11	Nomi Kolodny	27 – 15 March 1982	1.71 m (5 ft 7 in)	Maccabi Bnot Ashdod	(Israel)
F	12	Michal Epstein	28 – 5 March 1981	1.80 m (5 ft 11 in)	Maccabi Ramat Hen	(Israel)
F	13	Ekaterina Abramzon	21 – 1 July 1987	1.85 m (6 ft 1 in)	Bnot Hasharon	(Israel)
F	14	Katia Levitsky	23 – 2 November 1985	1.88 m (6 ft 2 in)	Maccabi Bnot Ashdod	(Israel)
C	15	Jennifer Fleischer	25 – 17 February 1984	1.95 m (6 ft 5 in)	Maccabi Bnot Ashdod	(Israel)

Head coach

- (Israel) Eli Rabi

Legend

- (C) Team captain
- nat field describes country
  of last club
  before the tournament
- Age field is age on June 7, 2009

=== Italy ===
Italy Women's National Basketball Team roster
Players
Coaches

Pos.	No.	Name	Age – Date of birth	Height	Club
PG	4	Mariangela Cirone	33 – 7 February 1976	1.70 m (5 ft 7 in)	Umana Reyer Venezia	(Italy)
PG	5	Maria Franchini	29 – 27 November 1979	1.81 m (5 ft 11 in)	Lavezzini Parma	(Italy)
PG	6	Chiara Pastore	22 – 4 August 1986	1.71 m (5 ft 7 in)	Famila Wuber Schio	(Italy)
F	7	Roberta Meneghel	32 – 3 May 1977	1.82 m (6 ft 0 in)	Acer ERG Priolo	(Italy)
SG	8	Simona Ballardini	28 – 24 March 1981	1.81 m (5 ft 11 in)	Umana Reyer Venezia	(Italy)
SG	9	Francesca Modica	27 – 23 September 1981	1.77 m (5 ft 10 in)	Club Atletico Faenza	(Italy)
PF	10	Laura Macchi	30 – 24 May 1979	1.88 m (6 ft 2 in)	Famila Wuber Schio	(Italy)
C	11	Kathrin Ress	23 – 26 June 1985	1.96 m (6 ft 5 in)	Famila Wuber Schio	(Italy)
PF	12	Raffaella Masciadri	28 – 30 September 1980	1.85 m (6 ft 1 in)	Famila Wuber Schio	(Italy)
PF	13	Manuela Zanon	29 – 12 January 1980	1.85 m (6 ft 1 in)	Geas Sesto San Giovanni	(Italy)
C	14	Adriana Grasso	34 – 12 June 1974	1.89 m (6 ft 2 in)	Pallacanestro Pozzuoli	(Italy)
C	15	Marte Alexander	33 – 1 March 1976	1.95 m (6 ft 5 in)	Club Atletico Faenza	(Italy)

Head coach

- (Italy) Giampiero Ticchi

Legend

- (C) Team captain
- nat field describes country
  of last club
  before the tournament
- Age field is age on June 7, 2009
