= EuroBasket Women 2009 =

2009 edition of the EuroBasket Women

EuroBasket 2009 Women
32nd FIBA European Women's Basketball Championship
- Eurobasket Women 2009 logo

Tournament details
- Host country: Latvia
- Dates: June 7 – 20
- Teams: 16
- Venues: 3 (in 3 host cities)

Final positions
- Champions: France (2nd title)
- Runners-up: Russia
- Third place: Spain
- Fourth place: Belarus

Tournament statistics
- MVP: (Greece) Evanthia Maltsi
- Top scorer: (Greece) Evanthia Maltsi 22.6
- Top rebounds: (Belarus) Yelena Leuchanka 9.2
- Top assists: (Turkey) Birsel Vardarlı 4.7
- PPG (Team): Latvia 69.2
- RPG (Team): Russia 42.8
- APG (Team): Belarus 14.2

Official website
- Official website

The 2009 European Women Basketball Championship, commonly called EuroBasket Women 2009, was the 32nd regional championship held by FIBA Europe. The competition was held in Latvia from June 7 to June 20, 2009.

== Qualified teams ==
- Latvia – as host.
- Russia, Spain, Belarus, Czech Republic – top 5 in EuroBasket Women 2007.
- Israel, Lithuania – top two teams in Group A.
- Turkey, Poland – top two teams in Group B.
- France, Slovakia – top two teams in Group C.
- Greece, Serbia – top two teams in Group D.
- Hungary – best third team.
- Ukraine, Italy – winners of Group A and Group B of the Additional qualifying round.

== Squads ==
At the start of tournament, all 16 participating countries had 12 players on their roster.

== Venues ==
The tournament will be held in three cities. The Preliminary round will be played at Liepāja and Valmiera, while the Qualifying and Final Round will be played at Riga.

City	Arena	Capacity
Liepāja	Liepāja Olympic Center	3,000
Riga	Arena Riga	11,200
Valmiera	Vidzeme Olympic Center	1,200

== Competition system ==
=== Preliminary round (June 7 – June 9) ===
The 16 participants will be divided into four groups of four teams each. The top three teams in each group will advance to the qualifying round. The last team will be eliminated.

=== Qualifying round (June 11 – June 16) ===
There will be two groups of six teams, each composed of the qualifiers from two Preliminary round groups. The results in the preliminary round will be taken into account. Each team will play the teams that qualified from the other group. The top four teams will advance to the quarterfinals. The bottom two teams will be eliminated.

=== Final round (June 18 – June 20) ===
This stage will be played in a knock-out system. In the quarterfinals, the first team in one group will play the fourth team in the other group, while the second place team will play against the third team in the opposite group. The winners of the quarterfinals will advance to the semifinals, and the winners of the semis will progress to the finals. The losers in the quarterfinals will play for fifth to eighth places.

== Preliminary round ==
=== Group A ===
Team	Pld	W	L	PF	PA	PD	Pts
Spain	3	3	0	222	172	+50	6
Slovakia	3	2	1	196	184	+12	5
Czech Republic	3	1	2	196	208	−12	4
Ukraine	3	0	3	191	241	−50	3

June 7
13:30

Report

Ukraine	55–77	Slovakia
Scoring by quarter: 16–26, 8–24, 19–14, 12–13
Pts: Ogorodnikova 16; Rebs: Gorbunova 8 Asts: Dubrovina, Alyoshkina 3		Pts: Žirková 16; Rebs: Kupčíková, Jurčenková 6 Asts: Žirková 5

Liepājas Olimpiskais Centrs, Liepāja
Attendance: 500
Referees: Regis Bardera (FRA), Marius Ciulin (ROU), Jurgis Laurinavicius (LTU)

June 7
18:00

Report

Czech Republic	59–66	Spain
Scoring by quarter: 23–14, 9–18, 15–19, 12–15
Pts: Kulichová 13; Rebs: Veselá 11; Asts: Veselá 5		Pts: Montañana 16; Rebs: Nicholls 11; Asts: Aguilar 3

Liepāja Olimpic Center, Liepāja
Attendance: 1200
Referees: Gianluca Mattioli (ITA), Jasmina Tatic (SRB), Fedor Dmitriev (BLR)

June 8
13:30

Report

Slovakia	65–58	Czech Republic
Scoring by quarter: 12–17, 23–18, 15–12, 15–11
Pts: Žirková 18; Rebs: Gyurcsi 9 Asts: Jalčová 3		Pts: Vítečková 14; Rebs: Hartigová 11; Asts: Bartoňová 3

Liepājas Olimpiskais Centrs, Liepāja
Attendance: 250
Referees: Marko Juras (SRB), Elena Chernova (RUS), Nicolas Maestre (FRA)

June 8
15:45

Report

Spain	85–59	Ukraine
Scoring by quarter: 15–13, 24–13, 24–20, 22–13
Pts: Domínguez 11; Rebs: Torrens 5 Asts: Torrens 7		Pts: Biryuk 16; Rebs: Biryuk, Malashenko 5 Asts: Biryuk 3

Liepājas Olimpiskais Centrs, Liepāja
Attendance: 250
Referees: Seffi Shemmesh (ISR), Sergey Krug (RUS), Kati Nynäs (FIN)

June 9
13:30

Report

Ukraine	77–79	Czech Republic
Scoring by quarter: 21–21, 20–10, 16–13, 20–35
Pts: Ogorodnikova 25; Rebs: Zherzherunova 8 Asts: Biryuk 6		Pts: Vítečková 16; Rebs: Kulichová 7 Asts: Veselá 6

Liepājas Olimpiskais Centrs, Liepāja
Attendance: 250
Referees: Gianluca Mattioli (ITA), Fedor Dmitriev (BLR), Marius Ciulin (ROU)

June 9
15:45

Report

Spain	71–54	Slovakia
Scoring by quarter: 17–16, 20–14, 16–10, 18–14
Pts: Montañana 24; Rebs: Nicholls 7 Asts: Palau 5		Pts: Žirková 9 Rebs: Gyurcsi 8 Asts: Žirková 3

Liepājas Olimpiskais Centrs, Liepāja
Attendance: 300
Referees: Mehmet Keseratar (TUR), Regis Bardera (FRA), Aare Halliko (EST)

=== Group B ===
Team	Pld	W	L	PF	PA	PD	Pts
Latvia	3	3	0	232	179	+53	6
Poland	3	2	1	174	199	−25	5
Greece	3	1	2	187	175	+12	4
Hungary	3	0	3	155	195	−40	3

June 7
15:45

Report

Greece	59–43	Hungary
Scoring by quarter: 16–4, 18–8, 10–20, 15–11
Pts: Kaltsidou, Maltsi 19; Rebs: Papamichail 8 Asts: Kalentzou 4		Pts: Fegyverneky 11; Rebs: Englert, Vajda 8 Asts: Németh 5

Liepājas Olimpiskais Centrs, Liepāja
Attendance: 350
Referees: Nicolas Maestre (FRA), Elena Chernova (RUS), Aare Halliko (EST)

June 7
20:30

Report

Latvia	86–52	Poland
Scoring by quarter: 24–12, 18–10, 20–15, 24–15
Pts: Jēkabsone-Žogota 20; Rebs: Tamane 8 Asts: Jēkabsone-Žogota 4		Pts: Kobryn 15; Rebs: Kobryn 6 Asts: six players 1

Liepājas Olimpiskais Centrs, Liepāja
Attendance: 2,492
Referees: Seffi Shemmesh (ISR), Sergey Krug (RUS), Kati Nynäs (FIN)

June 8
18:00

Report

Poland	62–60	Greece
Scoring by quarter: 16–14, 15–12, 12–18, 19–16
Pts: Kobryn 17; Rebs: Kobryn, Leciejewska 12; Asts: Walich, Jeziorna 2		Pts: Maltsi 21; Rebs: Papamichail 6 Asts: Kalentzou 5

Liepājas Olimpiskais Centrs, Liepāja
Attendance: 1,500
Referees: Gianluca Mattioli (ITA), Regis Bardera (FRA), Jurgis Laurinavicius (LTU)

June 8
20:15

Report

Hungary	59–76	Latvia
Scoring by quarter: 11–20, 13–20, 17–17, 18–19
Pts: Vajda 16; Rebs: Horti 5 Asts: Horti 3		Pts: Jēkabsone-Žogota 25; Rebs: Tamane 11; Asts: Jēkabsone-Žogota 5

Liepājas Olimpiskais Centrs, Liepāja
Attendance: 2,492
Referees: Mehmet Keseratar (TUR), Jasmina Tatic (SRB), Fedor Dmitriev (BLR)

June 9
18:00

Report

Poland	60–53	Hungary
Scoring by quarter: 13–16, 14–17, 15–10, 18–10
Pts: Kobryn 11; Rebs: Kobryn 9 Asts: Jeziorna 3		Pts: Vajda 18; Rebs: Vajda 10; Asts: three players 2

Liepājas Olimpiskais Centrs, Liepāja
Attendance: 1,500
Referees: Nicolas Maestre (FRA), Kati Nynäs (FIN), Sergey Krug (RUS)

June 9
20:15

Report

Greece	68–70 (OT)	Latvia
Scoring by quarter: 15–18, 6–19, 18–6, 19–15, Overtime: 10–12
Pts: Maltsi 24; Rebs: Papamichail 11; Asts: Kaltsidou 5		Pts: Jēkabsone-Žogota 26; Rebs: Tamane, Jansone7; Asts: Jēkabsone-Žogota 5

Liepājas Olimpiskais Centrs, Liepāja
Attendance: 2,492
Referees: Seffi Shemmesh (ISR), Marko Juras (SRB), Elena Chernova (RUS)

=== Group C ===
Team	Pld	W	L	PF	PA	PD	Pts
Russia	3	3	0	206	150	+56	6
Turkey	3	2	1	195	195	0	5
Lithuania	3	1	2	189	178	+11	4
Serbia	3	0	3	141	208	−67	3

June 7
13:30

Report

Lithuania	71–49	Serbia
Scoring by quarter: 16–10, 22–15, 14–13, 19–11
Pts: Petronyte 20; Rebs: Petronyte, Valuzyte 8 Asts: Valuzyte 4		Pts: Perović 11; Rebs: Perović 6 Asts: Petrović, Radočaj 2

Vidzemes Olimpiskais Centrs, Valmiera
Attendance: 660
Referees: Oliver Krause (GER), Peter Bodnar (HUN), Ilona Kittlerová (CZE)

June 7
18:20

Report

Russia	74–61	Turkey
Scoring by quarter: 29–16, 11–8, 12–13, 22–24
Pts: Abrosimova 16; Rebs: Shchegoleva, Stepanova 6 Asts: Shchegoleva, Stepanova, Osipova 3		Pts: Gümüşay 11; Rebs: Nevlin 9 Asts: Vardarlı 3

Vidzemes Olimpiskais Centrs, Valmiera
Attendance: 1,100
Referees: Lars Klaar (SWE), Maria Argirou (GRE), Ingus Baumanis (LAT)

June 8
13:30

Report

Turkey	69–66	Lithuania
Scoring by quarter: 25–13, 11–27, 14–11, 19–15
Pts: Nevlin 18; Rebs: Nevlin 10; Asts: Vardarlı 9		Pts: Stakneviciene 30; Rebs: Stakneviciene 10; Asts: Bimbaite, Valuzyte 4

Vidzemes Olimpiskais Centrs, Valmiera
Attendance: 400
Referees: Jaroslav Janac (SVK), Sergiy Chebyshev (UKR), Vaclav Lukes (CZE)

June 8
18:00

Report

Serbia	37–72	Russia
Scoring by quarter: 7–18, 9–14, 8–21, 13–19
Pts: Milovanović, Musović 6 Rebs: Puškar 7 Asts: Milovanović 2		Pts: Shchegoleva, Korstin, Abrosimova 11; Rebs: Kuzina 7 Asts: Arteshina 6

Vidzemes Olimpiskais Centrs, Valmiera
Attendance: 850
Referees: Georgios Tanatzis (GRE), Vicente Bulto (ESP), Grzegorz Bachanski (POL)

June 9
13:30

Report

Turkey	65–55	Serbia
Scoring by quarter: 21–11, 10–24, 20–8, 14–12
Pts: İvegin-Karslı 21; Rebs: Nevlin 7 Asts: Vardarlı 6		Pts: Petrović 14; Rebs: Petrović 5 Asts: 4 players 2

Vidzemes Olimpiskais Centrs, Valmiera
Attendance: 500
Referees: Juris Kokainis (LAT), Antonio Conde (ESP), Peter Bodnar (HUN)

June 9
20:15

Report

Lithuania	52–60	Russia
Scoring by quarter: 8–13, 19–10, 19–22, 6–15
Pts: Petronyte 17; Rebs: Petronyte 9 Asts: Valentiene 4		Pts: Arteshina 16; Rebs: Osipova 7 Asts: Abrosimova 6

Vidzemes Olimpiskais Centrs, Valmiera
Attendance: 1,200
Referees: Lars Klaar (SWE), Oliver Krause (GER), Ilona Kittlerová (CZE)

=== Group D ===
Team	Pld	W	L	PF	PA	PD	Pts
France	3	3	0	212	192	+20	6
Italy	3	2	1	203	198	+5	5
Belarus	3	1	2	200	206	−6	4
Israel	3	0	3	210	229	−19	3

June 7
15:45

Report

Belarus	81–76	Israel
Scoring by quarter: 17–21, 13–17, 22–10, 29–28
Pts: Troina 16; Rebs: Leuchanka 7 Asts: Marchanka 4		Pts: Doron 26; Rebs: Levitsky 12; Asts: Cohen, Selwyn 4

Vidzemes Olimpiskais Centrs, Valmiera
Attendance: 430
Referees: Grzegorz Bachanski (POL), Antonio Conde (ESP), Jaroslav Janac (SVK)

June 7
20:30

Report

Italy	61–76	France
Scoring by quarter: 14–15, 19–19, 11–23, 17–19
Pts: Macchi 16; Rebs: Macchi 5 Asts: Macchi, Cirone 2		Pts: Gruda 23; Rebs: Melain 8 Asts: Gomis 4

Vidzemes Olimpiskais Centrs, Valmiera
Attendance: 450
Referees: Vicente Bulto (ESP), Sergiy Chebyshev (UKR), Vaclav Lukes (CZE)

June 8
15:45

Report

Israel	64–75	Italy
Scoring by quarter: 10–32, 16–14, 19–13, 19–16
Pts: Suez-Karni 18; Rebs: Levitsky 6 Asts: Cohen 6		Pts: Masciadri 23; Rebs: Alexander 10; Asts: Cirone, Ballardini 4

Vidzemes Olimpiskais Centrs, Valmiera
Attendance: 600
Referees: Juris Kokainis (LAT), Oliver Krause (GER), Maria Argirou (GRE)

June 8
20:15

Report

France	63–61 (OT)	Belarus
Scoring by quarter: 16–10, 19–15, 14–21, 10–13, Overtime: 4–2
Pts: Dumerc 15; Rebs: Ndongue 11; Asts: Dumerc 5		Pts: Snytsina 10; Rebs: Verameyenka, Leuchanka 8 Asts: Marchanka 5

Vidzemes Olimpiskais Centrs, Valmiera
Attendance: 600
Referees: Lars Klaar (SWE), Ilona Kittlerová (CZE), Peter Bodnar (HUN)

June 9
15:45

Report

Belarus	58–67	Italy
Scoring by quarter: 18–12, 12–23, 12–19, 16–13
Pts: Snytsina 13; Rebs: Leuchanka 7 Asts: Marchanka, Leuchanka 2		Pts: Masciadri 20; Rebs: Alexander, Ballardini 5 Asts: Cirone, Macchi, Zanon 2

Vidzemes Olimpiskais Centrs, Valmiera
Attendance: 800
Referees: Ingus Baumanis (LAT), Jaroslav Janac (SVK), Georgios Tanatzis (GRE)

June 9
18:00

Report

France	73–70	Israel
Scoring by quarter: 17–19, 19–20, 16–13, 21–18
Pts: Sandrine Gruda, Emilie Gomis 11; Rebs: Elodie Godin 8 Asts: 3 players 3		Pts: Cohen 30; Rebs: Levitsky 5 Asts: 3 players 3

Vidzemes Olimpiskais Centrs, Valmiera
Attendance: 1,000
Referees: Vicente Bulto (ESP), Grzegorz Bachanski (POL), Vaclav Lukes (CZE)

== Qualifying round ==
Qualified for the quarterfinals

=== Group E ===
Team	Pld	W	L	PF	PA	PD	Pts
Spain	5	5	0	328	266	+62	10
Slovakia	5	3	2	319	313	+6	8
Latvia	5	3	2	350	312	+38	8
Greece	5	2	3	297	301	−4	7
Czech Republic	5	1	4	291	326	−35	6
Poland	5	1	4	293	360	−67	6

June 11
15:15

Report

Poland	56–65	Slovakia
Scoring by quarter: 8–14, 20–8, 12–21, 16–22
Pts: Bibrzycka 27; Rebs: Leciejewska 11; Asts: Bibrzycka 3		Pts: Žirková 20; Rebs: 3 players 7 Asts: Žirková 4

Arena Riga, Riga
Attendance: 200
Referees: Marko Juras (SRB), Péter Bodnár (HUN), Marius Ciulin (ROU)

June 11
17:45

Report

Greece	48–67	Spain
Scoring by quarter: 18–15, 17–24, 4–18, 9–10
Pts: Maltsi 26; Rebs: Papamichail 7 Asts: Kalentzou 4		Pts: Montañana 19; Rebs: Lima 9 Asts: Aguilar 4

Arena Riga, Riga
Attendance: 500
Referees: Oliver Krause (GER), Jasmina Tatic (SRB), Jurgis Laurinavicius (LTU)

June 11
20:30

Report

Czech Republic	47–65	Latvia
Scoring by quarter: 23–19, 8–15, 7–19, 9–12
Pts: Vítečková 16; Rebs: Hartigová 6 Asts: Bartoňová, Kulichová 3		Pts: Jēkabsone-Žogota 25; Rebs: Tamane 9 Asts: Jēkabsone-Žogota 4

Arena Riga, Riga
Attendance: 5,600
Referees: Lars Klaar (SWE), Mehmet Keseratar (TUR), Sergiy Chebyshev (UKR)

June 13
15:15

Report

Greece	62–45	Czech Republic
Scoring by quarter: 16–11, 14–11, 12–16, 20–7
Pts: Maltsi 24; Rebs: Papamichail 11; Asts: Kalentzou 7		Pts: Veselá 15; Rebs: Kulichová 11; Asts: three players 2

Arena Riga, Riga
Attendance: 300
Referees: Nicolas Maestre (FRA), Sergey Krug (RUS), Kati Nynäs (FIN)

June 13
17:45

Report

Spain	67–55	Poland
Scoring by quarter: 13–15, 18–24, 22–6, 14–10
Pts: Montañana 16; Rebs: Palau 7 Asts: Palau 4		Pts: Leciejewska 15; Rebs: Kobryn 7 Asts: Bibrzycka, Gajda 3

Arena Riga, Riga
Attendance: 500
Referees: Fedor Dmitriev (BLR), Elena Chernova (RUS), Sergiy Chebyshev (UKR)

June 13
20:15

Report

Slovakia	78–69	Latvia
Scoring by quarter: 15–17, 17–19, 29–17, 17–16
Pts: Žirková 24; Rebs: Hricková 8 Asts: Gyurcsi, Čarnoká 4		Pts: Jēkabsone-Žogota 20; Rebs: Basko 7 Asts: Jēkabsone-Žogota 4

Arena Riga, Riga
Attendance: 6,000
Referees: Gianluca Mattioli (ITA), Jasmina Tatic (SRB), Regis Bardera (FRA)

June 15
15:15

Report

Slovakia	57–59	Greece
Scoring by quarter: 16–17, 20–16, 7–13, 14–13
Pts: Žirková 13; Rebs: Kupčíková 11; Asts: Gyurcsi 4		Pts: Maltsi 22; Rebs: Papamichail 10; Asts: Kalentzou 5

Arena Riga, Riga
Attendance: 300
Referees: Oliver Krause (GER), Marius Ciulin (ROU), Elena Chernova (RUS)

June 15
17:45

Report

Poland	68–82	Czech Republic
Scoring by quarter: 14–21, 13–22, 21–19, 20–20
Pts: Leciejewska 12; Rebs: Leciejewska 6 Asts: Pawlak 2		Pts: Hartigová 17; Rebs: Veselá 6 Asts: Bednářová 5

Arena Riga, Riga
Attendance: 350
Referees: Gianluca Mattioli (ITA), Jurgis Laurinavicius (LTU), Aare Halliko (EST)

June 15
20:15

Report

Latvia	60–67	Spain
Scoring by quarter: 19–17, 13–14, 17–16, 11–20
Pts: Jēkabsone-Žogota 18; Rebs: Tamane, Basko 6 Asts: Jēkabsone-Žogota 4		Pts: Montañana 25; Rebs: three players 5 Asts: Palau 7

Arena Riga, Riga
Attendance: 7,900
Referees: Mehmet Keseratar (TUR), Nicolas Maestre (FRA), Peter Bodnar (HUN)

=== Group F ===
Team	Pld	W	L	PF	PA	PD	Pts
France	5	5	0	323	286	+37	10
Russia	5	4	1	333	295	+38	9
Belarus	5	2	3	317	321	−4	7
Italy	5	2	3	318	323	−5	7
Turkey	5	2	3	307	340	−33	7
Lithuania	5	0	5	286	319	−33	5

June 12
15:15

Report

Italy	59–64	Turkey
Scoring by quarter: 16–20, 8–13, 15–18, 20–13
Pts: Macchi 17; Rebs: Macchi 10; Asts: Masciadri, Cirone 2		Pts: Vardarlı 18; Rebs: Vardarlı 9 Asts: 4 players 2

Arena Riga, Riga
Attendance: 200
Referees: Vicente Bulto (ESP), Ilona Kittlerová (CZE), Aare Halliko (EST)

June 12
17:45

Report

Belarus	51–66	Russia
Scoring by quarter: 15–18, 8–14, 13–18, 15–16
Pts: Leuchanka 14; Rebs: Leuchanka 9 Asts: Marchanka 3		Pts: Stepanova 17; Rebs: Stepanova, Korstin 8 Asts: 3 players 3

Arena Riga, Riga
Attendance: 300
Referees: Seffi Shemmesh (ISR), Vaclav Lukes (CZE), Antonio Conde (ESP)

June 12
20:15

Report

Lithuania	55–57	France
Scoring by quarter: 14–15, 22–12, 12–15, 7–15
Pts: Ciudariene 17; Rebs: Bimbaite, Stakneviciene 7 Asts: Sauliute 3		Pts: Gruda 18; Rebs: Dumerc 9 Asts: Dumerc 8

Arena Riga, Riga
Attendance: 300
Referees: Juris Kokainis (LAT), Marko Juras (SRB), Georgios Tanatzis (GRE)

June 14
15:15

Report

Belarus	61–55	Lithuania
Scoring by quarter: 12–11, 25–12, 13–16, 11–16
Pts: Trafimava 15; Rebs: Leuchanka 14; Asts: Marchanka 7		Pts: Staknevičienė 17; Rebs: Petronytė 7 Asts: Bimbaitė, Valužytė 3

Arena Riga, Riga
Attendance: 500
Referees: Vicente Bulto (ESP), Jaroslav Janac (SVK), Grzegorz Bachanski (POL)

June 14
17:45

Report

Russia	67–59	Italy
Scoring by quarter: 23–19, 12–10, 14–11, 18–19
Pts: Abrosimova 19; Rebs: Abrosimova 9 Asts: Korstin 5		Pts: Macchi 15; Rebs: Alexander 8 Asts: Macchi 3

Arena Riga, Riga
Attendance: 500
Referees: Marko Juras (SRB), Ingus Baumanis (LAT), Maria Argirou (GRE)

June 14
20:15

Report

Turkey	43–55	France
Scoring by quarter: 11–14, 9–15, 12–9, 11–17
Pts: Palazoğlu 12; Rebs: Horasan 7 Asts: Vardarlı 4		Pts: Gruda 20; Rebs: Ndongue 6 Asts: Melain 6

Arena Riga, Riga
Attendance: 400
Referees: Lars Klaar (SWE), Seffi Shemmesh (ISR), Antonio Conde (ESP)

June 16
15:15

Report

Italy	72–58	Lithuania
Scoring by quarter: 21–19, 10–18, 17–6, 24–15
Pts: Alexander 17; Rebs: Alexander 7 Asts: Alexander, Ballardini 3		Pts: Bimbaitė 17; Rebs: Petronytė 9 Asts: 3 players 3

Arena Riga, Riga
Attendance: 250
Referees: Lars Klaar (SWE), Ingus Baumanis (LAT), Antonio Conde (ESP)

June 16
17:45

Report

Turkey	70–86	Belarus
Scoring by quarter: 21–27, 16–18, 21–22, 12–19
Pts: Nevlin 20; Rebs: İvegin, Nevlin 5 Asts: Vardarlı, Palazoğlu 4		Pts: Snytsina 19; Rebs: Leuchanka, Trafimava 8 Asts: Marchanka 6

Arena Riga, Riga
Attendance: 350
Referees: Juris Kokainis (LAT), Georgios Tanatzis (GRE), Sergiy Chebyshev (UKR)

June 16
20:15

Report

France	72–66	Russia
Scoring by quarter: 23–23, 18–13, 9–11, 22–19
Pts: Gruda 17; Rebs: Gruda 6 Asts: Hermouet, Dumerc 4		Pts: Hammon 18; Rebs: Osipova 10; Asts: Osipova 3

Arena Riga, Riga
Attendance: 600
Referees: Vicente Bulto (ESP), Jasmina Tatic (SRB), Vaclav Lukes (CZE)

== Knockout stage ==
=== Championship bracket ===
Quarter-finals
June 17
Spain	61
Italy	42
June 18
Russia (OT)	69
Latvia	64
June 17
Slovakia	68
Belarus (OT)	70
June 18
France	51
Greece	49

Semi-finals
June 19
Spain	61
Russia	77
June 19
Belarus	56
France	64

Final
June 20
Russia	53
France	57
Third place
June 20
Spain	63
Belarus	56

=== 5th place bracket ===
Semi-finals
June 19
Italy (OT)	68
Latvia	66
June 19
Slovakia	59
Greece	64

Fifth place
June 20
Italy	56
Greece	60
Seventh place
June 20
Latvia	67
Slovakia	59

=== Quarterfinals ===
June 17
17:45

Report

Slovakia	68–70 (OT)	Belarus
Scoring by quarter: 15–24, 8–12, 19–12, 18–12, Overtime: 8–10
Pts: Žirková 23; Rebs: Gyurcsi 11; Asts: Žirková 2		Pts: Verameyenka 13; Rebs: Leuchanka 12; Asts: Leuchanka 5

Arena Riga, Riga
Attendance: 300
Referees: Seffi Shemmesh (ISR), Peter Bodnar (HUN), Grzegorz Bachanski (POL)

June 17
20:15

Report

Spain	61–42	Italy
Scoring by quarter: 12–17, 17–11, 17–8, 15–6
Pts: Montañana 10; Rebs: Torrens 7 Asts: Nicholls, Palau 3		Pts: Macchi 18; Rebs: Masciadri 10; Asts: Cirone 4

Arena Riga, Riga
Attendance: 300
Referees: Vaclav Lukes (CZE), Marius Ciulin (ROU), Regis Bardera (FRA)

June 18
17:45

Report

France	51–49	Greece
Scoring by quarter: 10–7, 12–14, 15–13, 14–15
Pts: Gruda 16; Rebs: Gruda 10; Asts: Melain 5		Pts: Maltsi 18; Rebs: Kalentzou 6 Asts: Kalentzou 3

Arena Riga, Riga
Attendance: 400
Referees: Mehmet Keseratar (TUR), Sergiy Chebyshev (UKR), Antonio Conde (ESP)

June 18
20:15

Report

Russia	69–64 (OT)	Latvia
Scoring by quarter: 14–15, 12–15, 13–7, 14–16, Overtime: 16–11
Pts: Stepanova 16; Rebs: Stepanova, Abrosimova 12; Asts: Korstin, Stepanova 2		Pts: Jēkabsone-Žogota 23; Rebs: Jēkabsone-Žogota 8 Asts: Karklina, Jēkabsone-Žogota 2

Arena Riga, Riga
Attendance: 8,800
Referees: Lars Klaar (SWE), Oliver Krause (GER), Marko Juras (SRB)

=== Classification rounds ===
June 19
13:30

Report

Slovakia	59–64	Greece
Scoring by quarter: 11–17, 14–15, 22–10, 12–22
Pts: Gyurcsi 23; Rebs: Gyurcsi 12; Asts: Žirková 5		Pts: Maltsi 23; Rebs: Papamichail 9 Asts: 4 players 1

Arena Riga, Riga
Attendance: 150
Referees: Nicolas Maestre (FRA), Sergey Krug (RUS), Kati Nynäs (FIN)

June 19
15:45

Report

Italy	68–66 (OT)	Latvia
Scoring by quarter: 10–25, 13–14, 18–11, 21–12, Overtime: 6–4
Pts: Macchi 20; Rebs: Masciadri 7 Asts: Macchi 6		Pts: Baško 22; Rebs: Baško 7 Asts: Eibele, Jēkabsone-Žogota 3

Arena Riga, Riga
Attendance: 1,500
Referees: Vicente Bulto (ESP), Jurgis Laurinavicius (LTU), Ilona Kittlerová (CZE)

=== Semifinals ===
June 19
18:00

Report

Belarus	56–64	France
Scoring by quarter: 18–20, 16–20, 10–17, 12–7
Pts: Leuchanka 14; Rebs: Verameyenka 12; Asts: Verameyenka, Trafimava 3		Pts: Dumerc 13; Rebs: Gruda 13; Asts: Melain 5

Arena Riga, Riga
Attendance: 500
Referees: Juris Kokainis (LAT), Jasmina Tatic (SRB), Marius Ciulin (ROU)

June 19
20:15

Report

Spain	61–77	Russia
Scoring by quarter: 13–15, 11–11, 18–22, 19–29
Pts: Torrens 17; Rebs: Pascua 7 Asts: Aguilar 5		Pts: Hammon 28; Rebs: Stepanova 16; Asts: Osipova 4

Arena Riga, Riga
Attendance: 1,800
Referees: Gianluca Mattioli (ITA), Georgios Tanatzis (GRE), Mehmet Keseratar (TUR)

=== Seventh place game ===
June 20
13:30

Report

Latvia	67–59	Slovakia
Scoring by quarter: 13–17, 18–10, 21–18, 15–14
Pts: Niedola 16; Rebs: Niedola 11; Asts: Baško 7		Pts: Kupčíková 13; Rebs: Gyurcsi, Žirková 6 Asts: 3 players 3

Arena Riga, Riga
Attendance: 700
Referees: Fedor Dmitriev (BLR), Aare Halliko (EST), Maria Argirou (GRE)

=== Fifth place game ===
June 20
15:45

Report

Italy	56–60	Greece
Scoring by quarter: 15–18, 14–9, 17–13, 10–20
Pts: Macchi 22; Rebs: Masciadri 5 Asts: 4 players 1		Pts: Maltsi 26; Rebs: Papamichail 8 Asts: Kalentzou 7

Arena Riga, Riga
Attendance: 300
Referees: Vicente Bulto (ESP), Marius Ciulin (ROU), Jaroslav Janac (SVK)

=== Third place game ===
June 20
18:00

Report

Spain	63–56	Belarus
Scoring by quarter: 13–8, 23–12, 13–20, 14–16
Pts: Montañana 16; Rebs: Torrens 9 Asts: Valdemoro 4		Pts: Verameyenka 16; Rebs: Leuchanka 9 Asts: Padabed 5

Arena Riga, Riga
Attendance: 950
Referees: Juris Kokainis (LAT), Oliver Krause (GER), Nicolas Maestre (FRA)

=== Final ===
June 20
20:15

Report

Russia	53–57	France
Scoring by quarter: 10–12, 9–18, 14–16, 20–11
Pts: Stepanova 13; Rebs: Abrosimova 11; Asts: Abrosimova 4		Pts: Gruda 12; Rebs: Gruda 7 Asts: Melain 4

Arena Riga, Riga
Attendance: 3,200
Referees: Lars Klaar (SWE), Seffi Shemmesh (ISR), Marko Juras (SRB)

Eurobasket Women 2009 champion

France
Second title

Eurobasket Women 2009 MVP: Evanthia Maltsi (Greece)

All EuroBasket Women 2009 team:

- Svetlana Abrosimova (Russia)
- Anete Jēkabsone-Žogota(Latvia)
- Sandrine Gruda (France)
- Céline Dumerc (France)
- Evanthia Maltsi (Greece)

== Final standings ==
Place	Team
1	France
2	Russia
3	Spain
4	Belarus
5	Greece
6	Italy
7	Latvia
8	Slovakia
9–10	Turkey
9–10	Czech Republic
11-12	Poland
11-12	Lithuania
13–16	Israel
13–16	Hungary
13–16	Ukraine
13–16	Serbia

== World championship qualification ==
The teams qualified to 2010 FIBA World Championship for Women in the Czech Republic are:

- France
- Russia
- Spain
- Belarus
- Greece
- Czech Republic as host nation

== See also ==
- EuroBasket 2009
