= Fenerbahçe Women Euroleague 2013–14 =

The 2013–14 season is the 23rd edition of Europe's premier basketball tournament for women – EuroLeague Women since it was rebranded to its current format.

== Regular season ==
=== Group B ===
| | Team | Pld | W | L | PF | PA | Diff | Pts |
|---|---|---|---|---|---|---|---|---|
| 1. | (Turkey) Fenerbahçe | 12 | 12 | 0 | 858 | 709 | +149 | 24 |
| 2. | (Russia) Nadezhda Orenburg | 12 | 7 | 5 | 831 | 741 | +90 | 19 |
| 3. | (Poland) Wisła Can-Pack | 12 | 7 | 5 | 808 | 754 | +54 | 19 |
| 4. | (Hungary) UE Sopron | 12 | 5 | 7 | 749 | 808 | −59 | 17 |
| 5. | (Spain) Rivas Ecópolis | 12 | 5 | 7 | 808 | 828 | −20 | 17 |
| 6. | (France) Lattes Montpellier | 12 | 3 | 9 | 717 | 793 | −76 | 15 |
| 7. | (Czech Republic) BK IMOS Brno | 12 | 3 | 9 | 756 | 894 | −138 | 15 |

== Round 2 ==
| Team #1 | Agg. | Team #2 | 1st leg | 2nd leg | 3rd leg^{*} |
|---|---|---|---|---|---|
| Fenerbahçe (Turkey) | 2 – 0 | (Poland) CCC Polkowice | 75 – 57 | 64 – 48 | – |

== Final eight ==
=== Quarter-final round ===
==== Group A ====
| | Team | Pld | W | L | PF | PA | Diff | Pts |
|---|---|---|---|---|---|---|---|---|
| 1. | (Turkey) Fenerbahçe | 3 | 3 | 0 | 190 | 181 | +9 | 6 |
| 2. | (Turkey) Galatasaray Odeabank | 3 | 2 | 1 | 192 | 185 | +7 | 5 |
| 3. | (Russia) Spartak Moscow | 3 | 1 | 2 | 173 | 174 | -1 | 4 |
| 4. | (Turkey) Kayseri Kaski Spor | 3 | 0 | 3 | 162 | 177 | -15 | 2 |

=== Semi-final round ===
Semifinals; 11 April
(Russia) UMMC Ekaterinburg | 70
(Turkey) Galatasaray Odeabank | 77
(Turkey) Fenerbahçe | 59
(France) Bourges Basket | 50

Final; 13 April
(Turkey) Galatasaray Odeabank | 69
(Turkey) Fenerbahçe | 58
Third place
(Russia) UMMC Ekaterinburg | 80
(France) Bourges Basket | 60

==== Semifinal ====
11 April 2014
21:30 UTC+6

Report

| Fenerbahçe | 59–50 | Bourges Basket |
Scoring by quarter: 13-6, 13-18, 13-14, 20-12
| Pts: Angel McCoughtry (22); Rebs: Angel McCoughtry (10); Asts: Cappie Pondexter (5) | | Pts: Nwal-Endene Miyem (12); Rebs: Céline Dumerc (13); Asts: C.Dumerc, Paoline Salagnac (3) |

DIVS Sport Hall, Yekaterinburg
Attendance: 1000

=== Final ===
13 April 2014
19:00 UTC+6

Report

| Fenerbahçe | 58–69 | Galatasaray Odeabank |
Scoring by quarter: 7-26, 22-16, 15-11, 14-16
| Pts: Cappie Pondexter (18); Rebs: Cappie Pondexter(6); Asts: Agnieszka Bibrzycka, C.Pondexter(3) | | Pts: Sancho Lyttle (19); Rebs: Sancho Lyttle (12); Asts: Işıl Alben (8) |

DIVS Sport Hall, Yekaterinburg
Attendance: 6000
