= Fenerbahçe Women Euroleague 2011–12 =

The 2011–12 season is the 21st edition of Europe's premier basketball tournament for women - EuroLeague Women since it was rebranded to its current format.

== Group stage ==
=== Group B ===
	Team	Pld	W	L	PF	PA	Diff	Pts
1.	(Turkey) Fenerbahçe	12	12	0	967	778	+189	24
2.	(Spain) Perfumerías Avenida	12	8	4	907	822	+85	20
3.	(Russia) Nadezhda	12	7	5	822	814	+8	19
4.	(Italy) Beretta Famila	12	6	6	813	824	−11	18
5.	(Poland) CCC Polkowice	12	5	7	864	892	−28	17
6.	(Hungary) UNIQA Euroleasing Sopron	12	4	8	769	842	−73	16
7.	(France) Tarbes GB	12	0	12	774	944	−170	12

== Round 2 ==
Game 1 was played on 21 February 2012. Game 2 was played on 24 February 2012. Game 3 was played on 29 February 2012.

Team #1	Agg.	Team #2	1st leg	2nd leg	3rd leg^{*}
Fenerbahçe (Turkey)	2 – 0	(France) BLMA	83 – 71	80 – 72	-

== Final eight ==
=== Semifinal round ===
Final Eight will be held in Istanbul. The semifinal round will be played in a round robin system with two groups of four teams. The two group winners will play the final game.

==== Group A ====
	Team	Pld	W	L	PF	PA	Diff	Pts
1.	(Spain) Rivas Ecópolis (Q)	3	3	0	214	196	+18	6
2.	(Turkey) Fenerbahçe	3	2	1	219	199	+20	5
3.	(Turkey) Galatasaray Medical Park	3	1	2	215	221	–6	4
4.	(Italy) Beretta Famila	3	0	3	187	219	–32	3

28 March 2012
18:00

Report

Fenerbahçe (Turkey)	74–58	(Italy) Beretta Famila
Scoring by quarter: 22–17, 20–13, 14–18, 18–10
Pts: Matović 25; Rebs: Tamane 10; Asts: Vardarlı 5		Pts: Erkič 16; Rebs: Ford 12; Asts: Cohen 8

Abdi İpekçi Arena, Istanbul
Attendance: 3,000
Referees: Juris Kokainis (LAT), Haydn Jones (WAL), Carole Delauné (FRA)

29 March 2012
20:45

Report

Galatasaray Medical Park (Turkey)	67–75	(Turkey) Fenerbahçe
Scoring by quarter: 26–18, 19–18, 12–23, 10–16
Pts: Taurasi 20; Rebs: Charles 12; Asts: Prince 5		Pts: Tamane 19; Rebs: Tamane 9 Asts: Yılmaz 5

Abdi İpekçi Arena, Istanbul
Attendance: 8,574
Referees: Aleksandar Glišić (SRB), Andris Aunkrogers (LAT), Fabiana Nitu (ROU)

30 March 2012
18:00

Report

Fenerbahçe (Turkey)	70–74	(Spain) Rivas Ecópolis
Scoring by quarter: 15–22, 22–20, 9–16, 24–16
Pts: McCoughtry 21; Rebs: McCoughtry 9 Asts: Vardarlı 6		Pts: Jones 20; Rebs: Jones 11; Asts: Cruz 4

Abdi İpekçi Arena, Istanbul
Attendance: 3,000
Referees: Ademir Zurapović (BIH), Andris Aunkrogers (LAT), Haydn Jones (WAL)

=== Classification 3–4 ===
1 April 2012
18:00

Report

Fenerbahçe (Turkey)	68–75	(Russia) UMMC Ekaterinburg
Scoring by quarter: 20-27, 14-15, 18-11, 16-22
Pts: McCoughtry 20; Rebs: Yilmaz 12; Asts: Vardarli 4		Pts: Gruda 18; Rebs: Parker 11; Asts: Parker 5

Abdi İpekçi Arena, Istanbul
Attendance: 2,000
