= Irena Borecká =

Czech basketball player

Personal information
- Born: 5 November 1980 (age 45) Brno, Czechoslovakia
Medal record
Representing Czech Republic
Women's basketball
European Championships
Gold medal – first place	2005 Turkey	Team competition
Silver medal – second place	2003 Greece	Team competition

Irena Borecká (born 5 November 1980, in Brno) is a Czech former basketball player who competed in the 2004 Summer Olympics.
