= Michala Hartigová =

Czech basketball player

Medal record

Representing Czech Republic

Women's basketball

European Championships
Gold medal – first place	2005 Turkey	Team competition
Silver medal – second place	2003 Greece	Team competition

Michala Hartigová (born 14 November 1983 in Pardubice) is a Czech former basketball player who competed in the 2004 Summer Olympics and in the 2008 Summer Olympics.
