= Dita Krūmberga =

Latvian basketball player (born 1984)

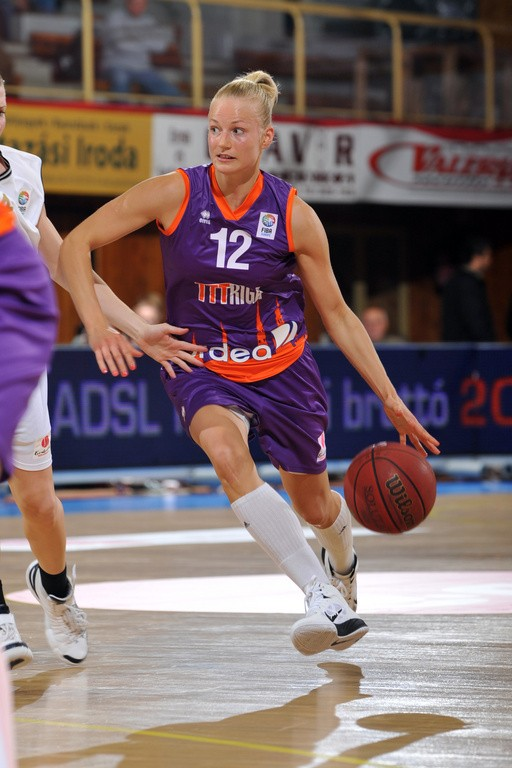

Personal information
- Born: 30 March 1984 (age 42) Riga, Latvia
- Listed height: 6 ft 0 in (1.83 m)
- Listed weight: 149 lb (68 kg)

Career information
- Playing career: 2004–2012
- Position: shooting guard
- Number: 12

Dita Krūmberga (born 20 March 1984 in Riga) is a retired Latvian women's basketball player. She joined TTT Rīga in 2008. Previously she had played for SK Cēsis, as well as several other local and foreign clubs before 2000. She played in Mount St. Mary's NCAA team from 2004 until 2007.

Krūmberga contributed to the successes of the team in EuroBaskets 2007 and 2009. Krūmberga also played in the 2008 Summer Olympics.

== Teams ==
- 2004–2007: Mount St. Mary's (USA)
- 2007–2008: MBK Ružomberok (Slovakia)
- 2008: SK Cēsis (Latvia)
- 2008–2012: TTT Rīga (Latvia)

== Achievements ==
- 2009 – 9th place in Eurobasket Women with Latvia women's national basketball team.
- 2009 – 2nd place in Latvian woman basketball league with TTT Rīga.
- 2009 – 4th place in Baltic woman basketball league with TTT Rīga.
- 2009 – participating in EuroLeague with TTT Rīga
- 2008 – 9th place in Beijing basketball tournament with Latvia women's national basketball team.
- 2008 – 4th place in FIBA "Diamond Ball" tournament in China.
- 2007 – 4th place in Eurobasket Women with Latvia women's national basketball team.
