= EuroBasket Women 2009 qualification =

This page describes the qualification procedure for EuroBasket Women 2009.

== Qualification format ==
The qualifying round was held from August 13 to September 13, 2008.

The top 2 teams in each group and the best team in 3rd place qualified to EuroBasket Women 2009.

The best 6 of the remaining teams will go to the additional qualifying round, from which 2 additional teams will qualify to EuroBasket Women 2009.

The last 4 teams will play in the relegation round, from which 2 teams will relegate to Division B in 2010–2011.

The additional qualifying round and the relegation round will be held from January 4 to January 19, 2009.

== Qualifying round ==
The draw for the qualifying round was held on February 16, 2008. The remaining 19 teams in Division A were divided into 3 groups of 5 teams and one group of 4 teams.

- Group A: **Israel**, **Lithuania**, Ukraine, Germany, Great Britain
- Group B: **Turkey**, **Poland**, Italy, Bosnia and Herzegovina, Finland
- Group C: **France**, **Slovakia**, **Hungary**, Croatia, Romania
- Group D: **Greece**, **Serbia**, Belgium, Bulgaria

(teams in bold qualified to EuroBasket Women 2009)

Qualified for EuroBasket Women 2009
Go to additional qualifying round
Go to relegation round

=== Group A ===
Team	Pts	W	L	PF	PA	Diff
**Israel**	14	6	2	604	537	+67
**Lithuania**	14	6	2	551	498	+53
Ukraine	13	5	3	580	527	+53
Germany	10	2	6	472	580	−108
Great Britain	9	1	7	540	605	−65

=== Group B ===
Team	Pts	W	L	PF	PA	Diff
**Turkey**	15	7	1	604	474	+130
**Poland**	15	7	1	612	481	+131
Italy	12	4	4	532	498	+34
Bosnia and Herzegovina	9	1	7	450	593	−143
Finland	9	1	7	443	595	−152

=== Group C ===
Team	Pts	W	L	PF	PA	Diff
**France**	15	7	1	547	469	+78
**Slovakia**	13	5	3	542	484	+58
**Hungary**	13	5	3	554	502	+52
Croatia	10	2	6	468	538	−70
Romania	9	1	7	497	615	−118

=== Group D ===
Team	Pts	W	L	PF	PA	Diff
**Greece**	11	5	1	448	376	+72
**Serbia**	9	3	3	425	4327	−7
Belgium	8	2	4	407	428	−21
Bulgaria	8	2	4	400	444	−44

== Additional qualifying round ==
=== Group A ===
Team	Pts	W	L	PF	PA	Diff
Ukraine	7	3	1	266	232	+34
Germany	6	2	2	229	245	−16
Bulgaria	5	1	3	264	282	−18

=== Group B ===
Team	Pts	W	L	PF	PA	Diff
Italy	7	3	1	303	258	+45
Croatia	6	2	2	303	314	−11
Belgium	5	1	3	300	334	−34
