= Elisa Aguilar =

Spanish basketball player

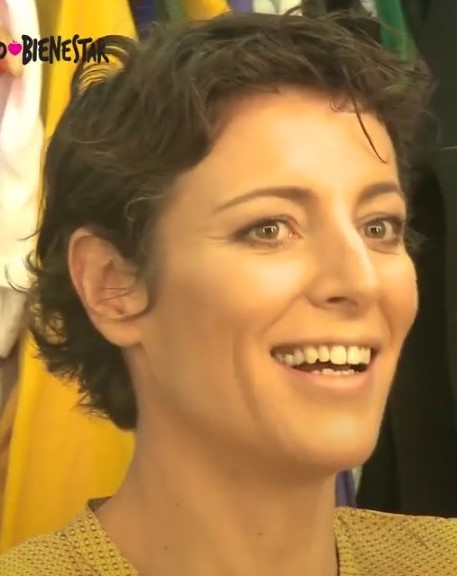

Personal information
- Born: September 15, 1976 (age 50) Madrid, Spain
- Listed height: 172 cm (5 ft 8 in)

Career information
- Playing career: 1994–2013
- Position: Point guard

Career history
- 1994-1997: Real Canoe NC
- 1997-2000: George Washington Colonials
- 2000-2001: Halcón Viajes Salamanca
- 2001-2002: Caja Rural Canarias
- 2002: Utah Starzz
- 2002-2010: Ros Casares Valencia
- 2010-2012: Rivas Ecópolis
- 2012-2013: WBC Spartak Moscow Region

Career highlights
- 5× Spanish League champion (2004, 2007-2010); 8× Spanish Cup champion (1996, 2003, 2004, 2007-2011)
- Stats at Basketball Reference

Elisabeth Aguilar López (born 15 October 1976) is a Spanish former women's basketball player, member of the Spanish women's basketball team. After four years at George Washington Colonials, she spent most of her senior career in Spanish clubs (Real Canoe NC, Halcón Viajes Salamanca, Caja Rural Canarias, Ros Casares Valencia and Rivas Ecópolis, with just a couple of stints abroad: 2002 at Utah Starzz and 2012-13 at WBC Spartak Moscow Region. She won five Spanish Leagues, eight Spanish Cups and six medals with the Spanish senior team, retiring as European champion in 2013.

== Club career ==
Elisa Aguilar started playing at home town of Madrid, at Real Canoe NC youth levels, making her debut in the top tier of the Spanish League with the senior team at 16. She played in several Spanish clubs from 1998 to 2001, when she moved to the United States to complete a college degree and at the same time play for the George Washington Colonials team. She continued most of her career in Europe (Spain, Russia), also playing for the Utah Starzz in 2002.

== National team ==
She made her debut with Spain women's national basketball team at the age of 20. She played with the senior team for 17 years, from 1996 to 2013. She is one of the most capped players with a total of 222 caps and 5.3 PPG. She retired from the national team at the age of 36 with the gold medal at the 2013 Eurobasket. She participated in two Olympic Games (Athens 2004, Beijing 2008), three World Championships and seven European Championships:

- 1993 FIBA Europe Under-16 Championship for Women (youth)
- 1994 FIBA Europe Under-18 Championship for Women (youth)
- 5th 1997 Eurobasket
- 5th 1998 World Championship
- 2001 Eurobasket
- 6th 2004 Summer Olympics
- 2005 Eurobasket
- 8th 2006 World Championship
- 2007 Eurobasket
- 5th 2008 Summer Olympics
- 2009 Eurobasket
- 2010 World Championship
- 9th 2011 Eurobasket
- 2013 Eurobasket

== Career statistics ==
Legend
| GP | Games played | GS | Games started | MPG | Minutes per game | RPG | Rebounds per game |
| APG | Assists per game | SPG | Steals per game | BPG | Blocks per game | PPG | Points per game |
| TO | Turnovers per game | FG% | Field-goal percentage | 3P% | 3-point field-goal percentage | FT% | Free-throw percentage |
| **Bold** | Career best | ° | League leader |

=== WNBA ===
==== Regular season ====
WNBA regular season statistics
| Year | Team | GP | GS | MPG | FG% | 3P% | FT% | RPG | APG | SPG | BPG | TO | PPG |
|---|---|---|---|---|---|---|---|---|---|---|---|---|---|
| 2002 | Utah | 28 | 0 | 5.0 | .424 | .524 | .571 | 0.4 | 0.6 | 0.1 | 0.1 | 0.4 | 1.5 |
| **Career** | 1 year, 1 team | 28 | 0 | 5.0 | .424 | .524 | .571 | 0.4 | 0.6 | 0.1 | 0.1 | 0.4 | 1.5 |

==== Playoffs ====
WNBA playoff statistics
| Year | Team | GP | GS | MPG | FG% | 3P% | FT% | RPG | APG | SPG | BPG | TO | PPG |
|---|---|---|---|---|---|---|---|---|---|---|---|---|---|
| 2002 | Utah | 2 | 0 | 2.0 | — | — | — | 0.0 | 1.0 | 0.0 | 0.0 | 0.0 | 0.0 |
| **Career** | 1 year, 1 team | 2 | 0 | 2.0 | — | — | — | 0.0 | 1.0 | 0.0 | 0.0 | 0.0 | 0.0 |

=== College ===
NCAA statistics
| Year | Team | GP | GS | MPG | FG% | 3P% | FT% | RPG | APG | SPG | BPG | TO | PPG |
|---|---|---|---|---|---|---|---|---|---|---|---|---|---|
| 1997–98 | George Washington | 30 | | | **.410** | .374 | **.848** | 3.0 | 4.9 | **2.5** | **0.1** | | **17.2** |
| 1998–99 | George Washington | 22 | | | .397 | **.421** | .828 | **3.5** | **5.4** | 1.6 | **0.1** | | 15.4 |
| 1999–00 | George Washington | **32** | | | .378 | .382 | .845 | 2.3 | 3.6 | 1.8 | 0.0 | | 14.6 |
| **Career** | | 84 | — | — | .395 | .390 | .843 | 2.9 | 4.5 | 2.0 | 0.1 | — | 15.7 |
