= Marte Alexander =

American born Italian basketball player

Personal information
- Born: March 1, 1976 (age 50) Inglewood, California
- Listed height: 6 ft 3 in (1.91 m)

Career information
- College: Arizona (1994–1998)
- WNBA draft: 2000: 3rd round, 47th overall pick
- Drafted by: Los Angeles Sparks
- Position: Center
- Stats at Basketball Reference

Marte Alexander Martinelli (born March 1, 1976) is an American born Italian basketball player.

== Career statistics ==
Legend
GP	Games played	GS	Games started	MPG	Minutes per game	RPG	Rebounds per game
APG	Assists per game	SPG	Steals per game	BPG	Blocks per game	PPG	Points per game
TO	Turnovers per game	FG%	Field-goal percentage	3P%	3-point field-goal percentage	FT%	Free-throw percentage
**Bold**	Career best	°	League leader

=== College ===
Year	Team	GP	GS	MPG	FG%	3P%	FT%	RPG	APG	SPG	BPG	TO	PPG
1994–95	Arizona	19	-	-	48.5	0.0	**65.0**	1.9	0.1	0.2	0.3	-	2.4
1995–96	Arizona	30	-	-	**66.9**	0.0	49.6	4.1	0.4	0.8	0.7	-	8.0
1996–97	Arizona	**31**	-	-	53.4	0.0	52.8	6.2	**0.5**	**1.7**	1.4	-	10.3
1997–98	Arizona	29	-	-	59.4	0.0	55.3	**6.5**	**0.5**	**1.7**	**1.8**	-	**12.9**
**Career**		109	-	-	58.4	0.0	53.4	5.0	0.4	1.2	1.1	-	9.0
Statistics retrieved from Sports-Reference.

== Personal life ==
Born in Inglewood, she studied at University of Arizona and played with the Wildcats team. In 1998 she joined the Italian team Bees Pavia in the Italian league, from 1999 to 2001 he played for Bees Treviglio team. From 2002 to 2004 Alexander played for Germano Zara team, then she played for 1 year in Reggio Emilia. After one year in the Spanish league with Gran Canaria she returned to Germano Zara Faenza, her current team. In 2006, she acquired the Italian citizenship and played for the Italy women's national basketball team in the EuroBasket Women 2009. In June 2012 Alexander retired.

In 2025, her oldest son, Anthony Martinelli, played 6'4 forward at Dysart High School in Arizona.
