= Evanthia Maltsi =

Greek basketball player (born 1978)

Evina Maltsi
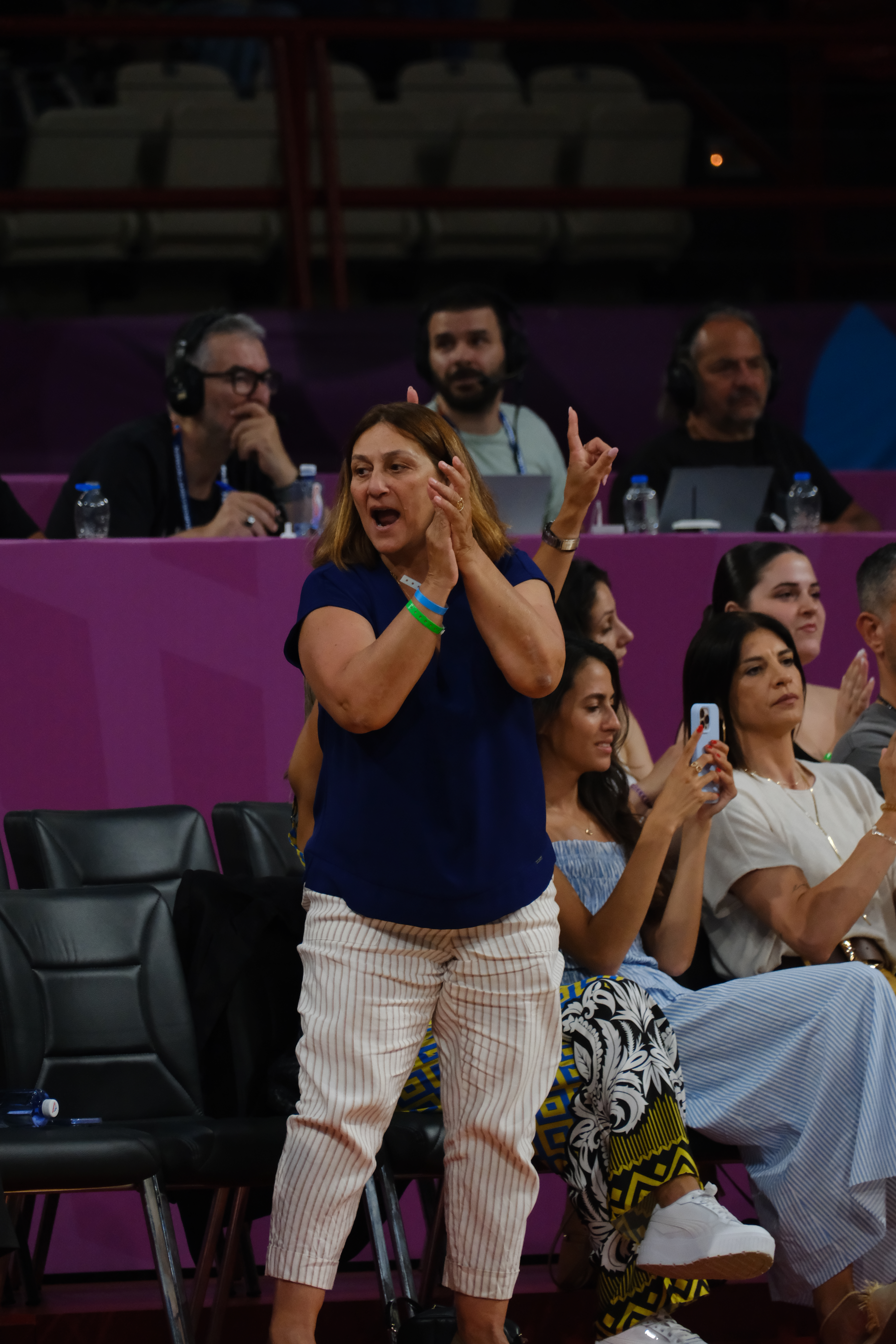

Personal information
- Born: 30 December 1978 (age 47) Goumenissa, Greece
- Listed height: 5 ft 11 in (1.80 m)
- Listed weight: 195 lb (88 kg)

Career information
- Playing career: 1997–2019
- Position: Guard

Career history
- 1997–1998: Megas Alexandros
- 1998–2000: MENT Thessaloniki
- 2000–2004: Panathinaikos
- 2004–2005: Celta de Vigo Baloncesto
- 2005–2006: CDB Zaragoza
- 2006–2007: CJM Bourges Basket
- 2007: Connecticut Sun
- 2007–2008: Ros Casares
- 2008–2011: USK Praha
- 2011–2012: Polkowice
- 2012–2013: Kayseri Kaski
- 2013–2014: Homend Antakya
- 2014–2016: Botaş
- 2016–2018: Olympiacos
- 2018–2019: ZTE KK

Career highlights
- FIBA EuroBasket MVP (2009); FIBA EuroBasket Top Scorer (2009); FIBA EuroBasket steals leader (2009); 3× Euroleague All-Star (2007, 2008, 2009); 2× Czech National League champion (2009, 2011); 2× Czech Cup winner (2010, 2011); 2× Greek National League champion (2017, 2018); 2× Greek Cup winner (2017, 2018); Spanish National League champion (2008); Spanish Cup winner (2008); Spanish SuperCup winner (2007); French Federation Cup winner (2007)
- Stats at WNBA.com
- Stats at Basketball Reference

Evanthia "Evina" Maltsi (Greek: Εβίνα Μάλτση; born 30 December 1978) is a Greek former professional basketball guard. In 2007, she played for Connecticut Sun in the WNBA, appearing in 29 games, 26 in the regular season (7 as a starter) and 3 in the playoffs. A three time Euroleague All-Star (2007–2009), Maltsi has a long career in European club basketball, having played in Spain, France, Czech Republic, Poland and Turkey besides her native Greece and she has won numerous titles as a player of CJM Bourges, Ros Casares Valencia, USK Praha and Olympiacos.

Maltsi is the captain of Greece women's national basketball team, having represented her country in several Eurobasket Women, the 2004 Olympic Games and the 2010 FIBA World Championship. She led the Greek national team to the fifth place in 2009 FIBA Eurobasket earning the EuroBasket MVP award, a remarkable feat considering that Maltsi was voted MVP despite the fact that Greece didn't enter the semi-finals. She was also the FIBA EuroBasket 2009 Top Scorer and steals leader, averaging 22.6 points and 3.1 steals per game. She has been elected to the All-EuroBasket Team two times, the first in 2009 and the second in Eurobasket 2017 in Czech Republic where, at the age of 38, she led Greece to the semi-finals and the fourth place in the tournament, their best ever Eurobasket performance.

== WNBA career ==
Maltsi played for the Connecticut Sun in the 2007 WNBA season. She appeared in 29 games for Connecticut, 26 in the regular season (7 as a starter) averaging 5.7 points (41.6% 3-point percentage), 1.5 assists and 2.5 rebounds per game. She scored a WNBA career high 23 points with 5/5 3-point shots against the Los Angeles Sparks at Staples Center on 7 July 2007, leading Connecticut in a 110–87 away win. She also played in 3 games in the 2007 WNBA Playoffs where Connecticut lost 2–1 to Indiana Fever in the first round. Sun wanted Maltsi to return for next year, but she had difficulties with her job in Greece.

== Olympic Games ==
Evina Maltsi participated for the first time in Olympic Games in the 2004 Summer Olympics in Athens. Greece reached the quarter-finals but lost to the eventual champions United States 102–72. Greece finished 7th after winning New Zealand with score 87–83.

Evina scored 20.9 points per game and she was third in the list, holding the tournament's record for most points in a game, with 33 against Japan. She had also 8.0 rebounds per game and she finished fifth at the tournament in this category.

== World Championships ==
She finished third in scoring at the 2010 FIBA World Championship for Women.

== EuroBasket ==
=== 2005 FIBA EuroBasket Turkey ===
Greece finished tenth at the FIBA EuroBasket 2005, with Maltsi being the ninth highest scorer of the tournament with 92 total points and 13.1 points per game. She was also one of the best players of the tournament.

=== 2007 FIBA EuroBasket Italy ===
Greece finished thirteenth at the FIBA EuroBasket 2007.

=== 2009 FIBA EuroBasket Latvia ===
Evina Maltsi led Greece into the 5th place for the first time. They lost their quarter-final to France by two points, 51–49. But Greece won two consecutive matches and took the fifth place. First they won the classification round against Slovakia with score 64–59, and then they became Europe's fifth best national team, beating Italy for the fifth place game with score 60–56.

Maltsi was the FIBA EuroBasket Top Scorer and the FIBA EuroBasket steals leader.

She was also selected in the FIBA EuroBasket All-Star Team and was EuroBasket's best player winning the FIBA EuroBasket MVP of the tournament award.

=== 2011 FIBA EuroBasket Poland ===
Maltsi in 2011

Greece finished 13th at the FIBA EuroBasket 2011.

=== 2017 FIBA EuroBasket Czech Republic ===
At the age of 39 Evina Maltsi was the captain of Greece which finished 4th at the FIBA EuroBasket 2017 after losing the Bronze medal match to Belgium. This was the first time in the history that Greece women's national basketball team played for a medal.

Maltsi finished second in scoring at the tournament with 113 points and sixth in the PPG list with 16.1 points per game. She had also 4.1 assists per game finishing eighth at the tournament and 6.6 rebounds per game being the tenth best player in this category at the tournament.

== Honours ==
- CJM Bourges Basket
  - French Federation Cup : 2007
- Ros Casares Valencia
  - Liga Femenina : 2008
  - Copa de la Reina : 2008
  - Supercopa de España : 2007
- USK Praha
  - Czech Basketball League : 2009, 2011
  - Czech Basketball Cup : 2010, 2011
- Olympiacos
  - Greek Basketball League : 2017, 2018
  - Greek Basketball Cup : 2017, 2018
