= Élodie Godin =

French basketball player

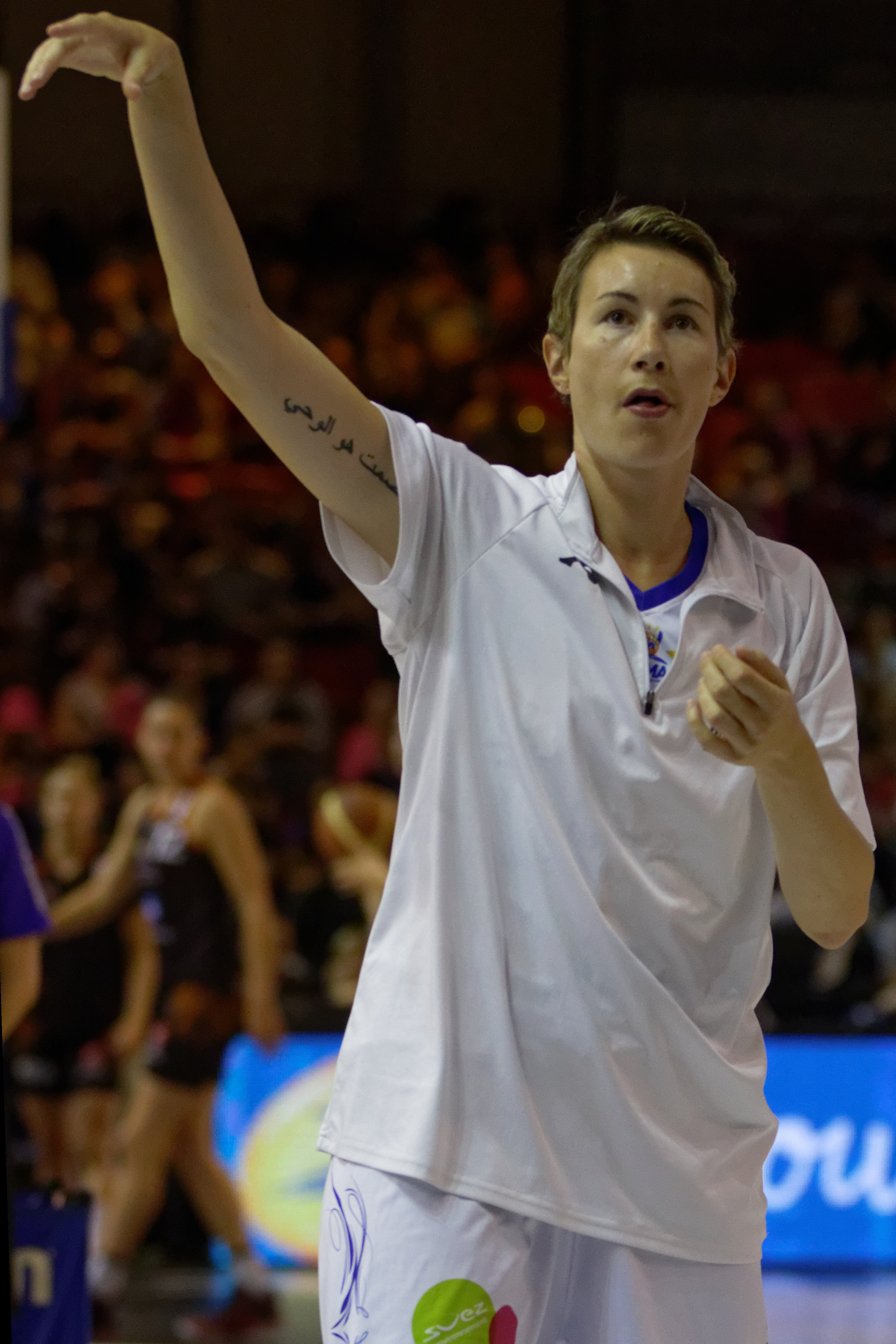

Personal information
- Born: July 5, 1985 (age 41) Cherbourg, France
- Listed height: 190 cm (6 ft 3 in)

Career information
- Playing career: 2003–2023

Career history
- 2003–2006: Tango Bourges Basket
- 2006–2007: Union Sportive Valenciennes Olympic
- 2007–2008: USK Praha
- 2008–2012: Taranto Cras Basket
- 2012–2014: PF Schio
- 2014–2017: Basket Lattes Montpellier Agglomération
- 2017–2023: Tango Bourges Basket
Medals
Women's basketball
Representing France
Olympic Games
Silver medal – second place	2012 London	Team
EuroBasket
Gold medal – first place	2009 Latvia	Team

Élodie Godin (born 5 July 1985, in Cherbourg) is a French former basketball player. She was a member of the French national team, winning the 2009 Eurobasket and a silver medal at the 2012 Summer Olympics and playing the 2006 and 2010 World Championships.
