= Olga Arteshina =

Russian basketball player (born 1982)

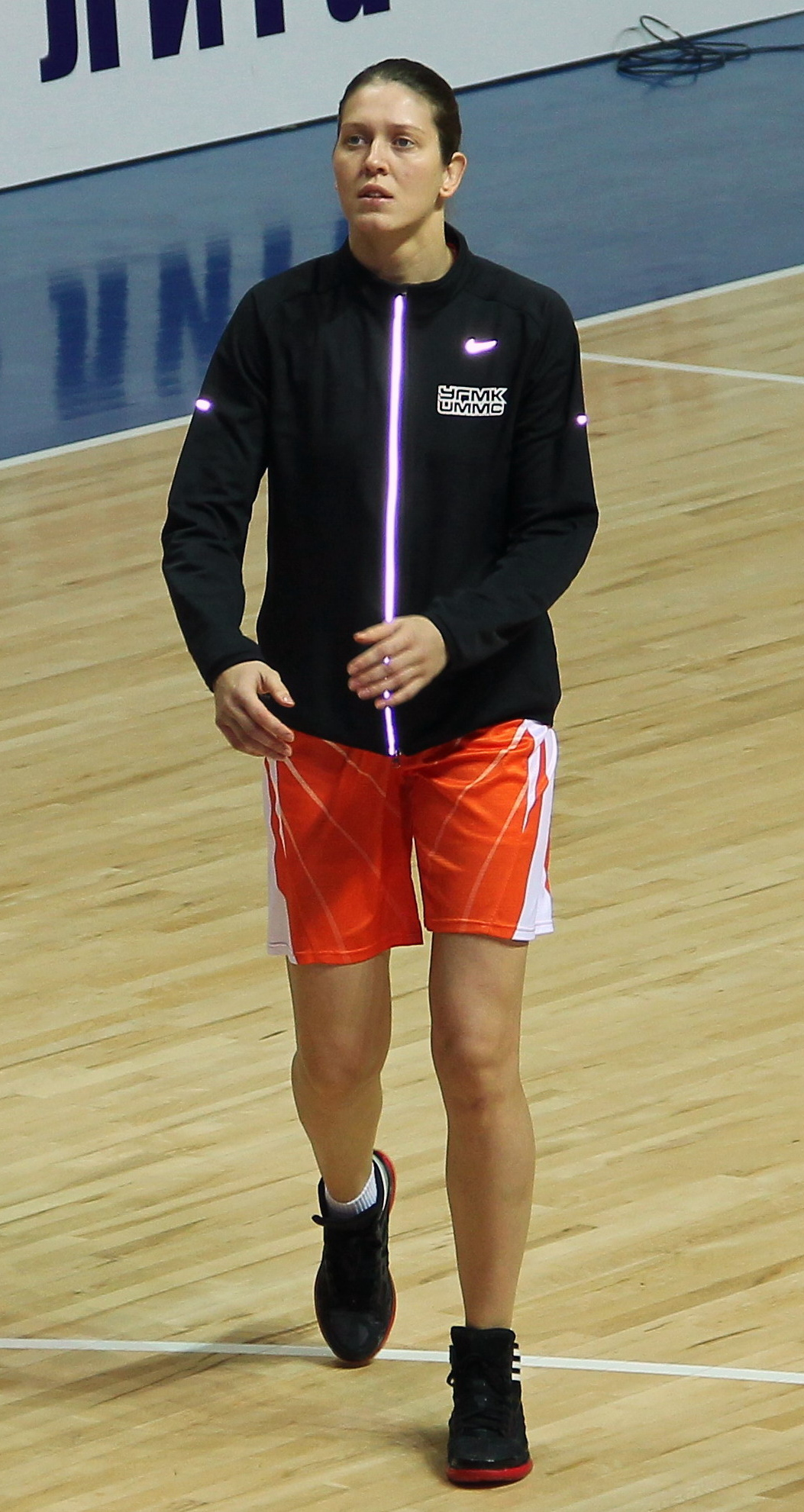
- Arteshina in 2012

Personal information
- Born: 27 November 1982 (age 43) Kuybyshev, Russian SFSR, Soviet Union
- Height: 191 cm (6 ft 3 in)
- Weight: 78 kg (172 lb)

Sport
- Sport: Basketball
- Club: 1997–2007 (Russia) CSKA Samara; 2007–2008 (Russia) CSKA Moscow; 2009– (Russia) UMMC Ekaterinburg
Medal record
Representing Russia
Olympic Games
Bronze medal – third place	2004 Athens	Team
World Championships
Silver medal – second place	2002 China	Team
Silver medal – second place	2006 Brazil	Team
European Championships
Silver medal – second place	2001 France	Team
Gold medal – first place	2003 Greece	Team
Gold medal – first place	2007 Italy	Team
Silver medal – second place	2009 Latvia	Team
Gold medal – first place	2011 Poland	Team

Olga Dmitrievna Arteshina (Russian: Ольга Дмитриевна Артешина, born 27 November 1982) is a Russian basketball player. Since 2000 she played in most international competitions for the Russian national team, except for the 2008 Olympics which she missed due to giving birth to a daughter; she won an Olympic bronze medal in 2004 and three gold and four silver medals at the world and European championships. At the club level she was the EuroLeague champion in 2005, 2013 and 2016.
