= Markéta Bednářová =

Czech basketball player

Medal record

Representing Czech Republic

Women's basketball

World Championships
Silver medal – second place	2010 Czech Republic	Team competition

European Championships
Gold medal – first place	2005 Turkey	Team competition
Silver medal – second place	2003 Greece	Team competition

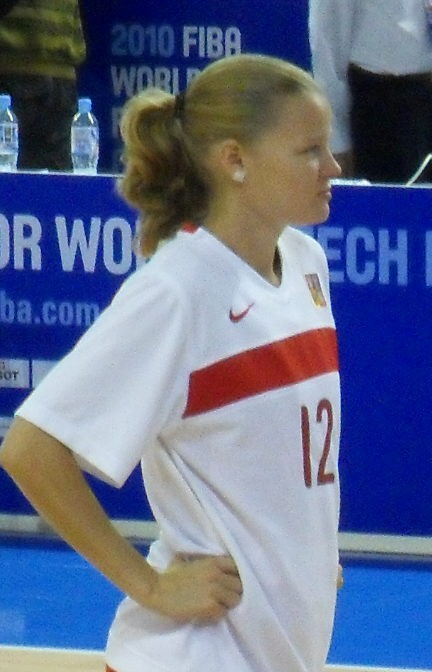
Markéta Bednářová (née Mokrošová); in: Japan - Czech Republic match at 2010 FIBA World Championship for Women, Brno, Czech Republic

Markéta Bednářová (née Mokrošová, born 17 April 1981 in Nové Město na Moravě) is a Czech basketball player who competed in the 2008 Summer Olympics.
