= Marina Puškar =

Serbian basketball player

Personal information
- Born: 6 June 1982 (age 44) Belgrade, SFR Yugoslavia
- Listed height: 1.94 m (6 ft 4 in)

Career information
- WNBA draft: 2004: undrafted
- Playing career: 2000–2010
- Position: Power forward / center

Career history
- Pančevo
- Spartak Subotica
- Herceg Novi
- –2003: Crvena zvezda
- 2003–2004: Vojvodina
- 2004–2005: USO Mondeville
- 2005–2006: ASDG Comense 1872
- 2006–2007: Montigarda Basket
- 2007–2008: Virtus Viterbo
- 2008–2009: Crvena zvezda

Marina Puškar (Serbian Cyrillic: Марина Пушкар, born 6 June 1982 in Belgrade, SFR Yugoslavia) is a Serbian female basketball player.
