= Anda Eibele =

Latvian basketball player

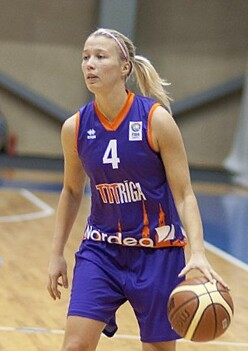

Anda Eibele (born 30 July 1984 in Riga) is a Latvian women's basketball player with the Latvia women's national basketball team. She competed with the team at the 2008 Summer Olympics, where she scored 3 points in 5 games.
