= Marina Kuzina =

Russian basketball player

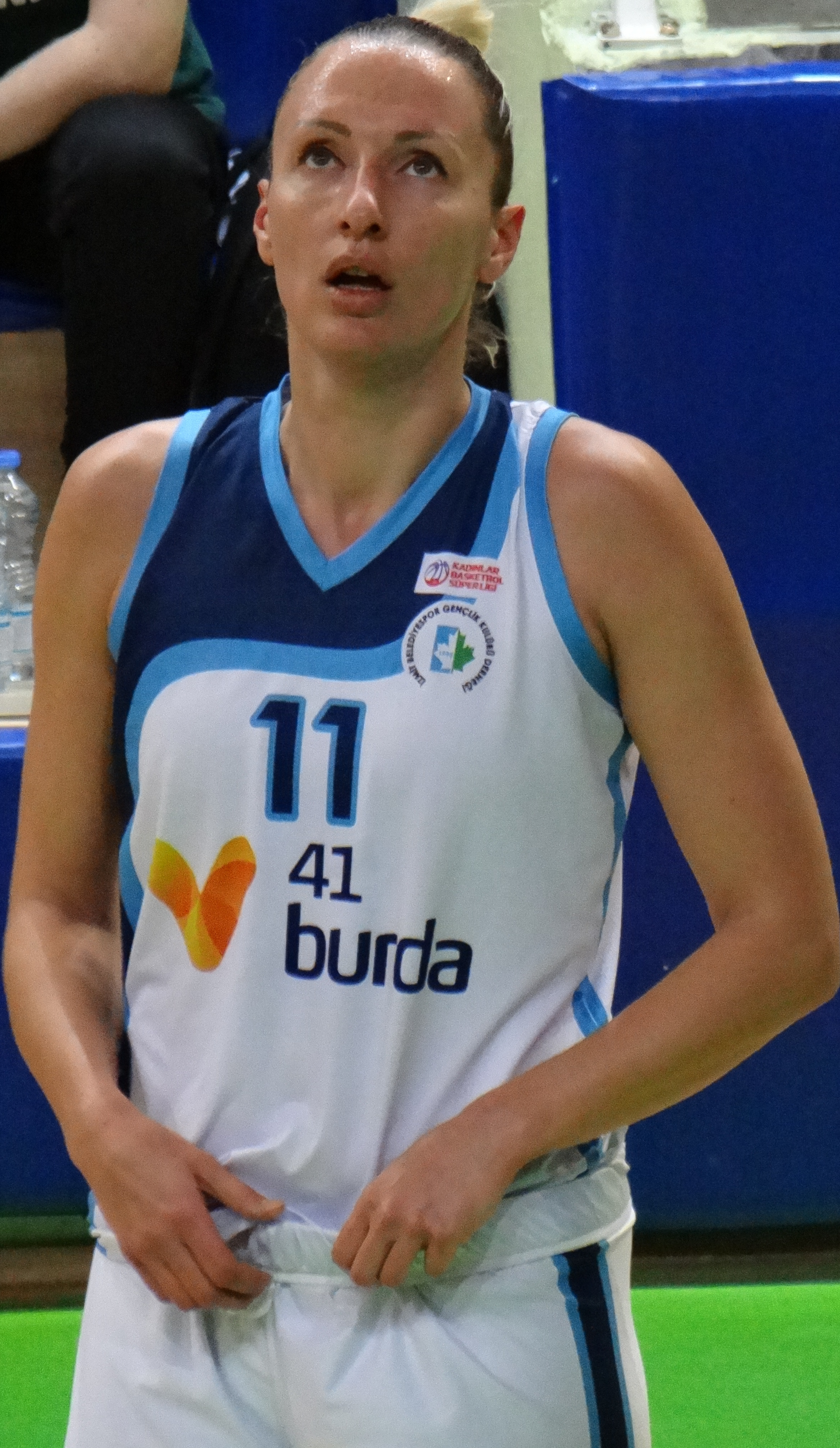
- Marina Kuzina in 2018

Personal information
- Born: 19 July 1985 (age 41) Moscow, Russia
- Listed height: 1.95 m (6 ft 5 in)
- Stats at Basketball Reference
Medals
Representing Russia
Women's basketball
Olympic Games
Bronze medal – third place	2008 Beijing	Team competition

Marina Kuzina (born 19 July 1985 in Moscow) is a Russian basketball player who competed for the Russian National Team at the 2008 Summer Olympics, winning the bronze medal. She was also part of the 2012 Summer Olympics Russian team who missed out on a bronze medal, losing the bronze medal match 74-83 to Australia.

She was the Russian Best Young Player in 2005.
