= Gunta Baško =

Latvian basketball player

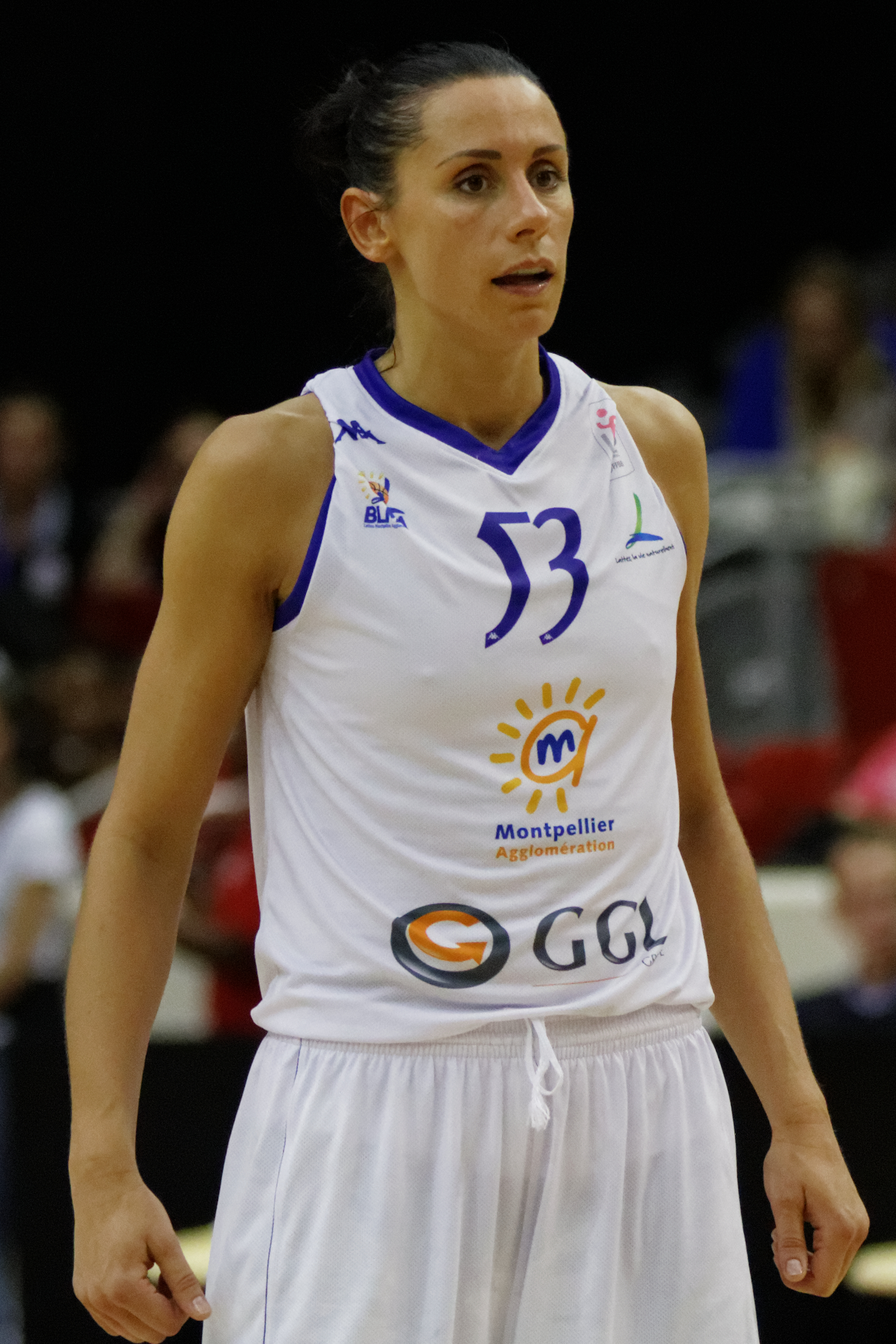

No. 8 – TTT Riga
- Position: Forward
- League: LSBL

Personal information
- Born: 27 April 1980 (age 46) Riga, Latvian SSR, Soviet Union
- Listed height: 5 ft 11 in (1.80 m)
- Listed weight: 163 lb (74 kg)

Career information
- College: Siena (1999–2003)
- WNBA draft: 2003: undrafted
- Playing career: 2003–2019

Career history
- 2003–2004: AS Ramat Hasharon
- 2004–2006: Lattes-Maurin Montpellier
- 2008–2009: Perfumerias Avenida
- 2009–2010: Umana Reyer Venezia
- 2010–2011: TS Wisła Can Pack Kraków

Gunta Baško (formerly known also as Gunta Baško-Melnbārde; born 27 April 1980) is a Latvian women's basketball player currently playing for TTT Riga and Latvia women's national basketball team.

Baško first played in a professional team in 1995. After three years with the local RTU/Klondaika Rīga team Baško moved to Siena Saints of NCAA. In 2003, she moved to Israel, then spent four years in France and is currently a member of Wisła Can Pack Kraków team.

At age 19, she already represented Latvia at EuroBasket Women 1999. She was one of the youngest players in the tournament. Baško also contributed to the successes of the team in EuroBaskets 2005 and 2007.

== Siena statistics ==
Ratios
Year	Team	GP	FG%	3P%	FT%	RBG	APG	BPG	SPG	PPG
1999-00	Siena	28	41.7%	21.5%	64.1%	5.71	1.71	0.57	1.61	11.93
2000-01	Siena	30	48.8%	37.5%	72.9%	9.70	2.00	0.90	2.50	16.40
2001-02	Siena	30	51.2%	39.4%	83.2%	10.47	2.77	1.63	2.73	18.40
2002-03	Siena	33	40.7%	29.2%	74.6%	7.88	3.97	1.03	1.94	13.79
Career		121	45.7%	32.3%	74.7%	8.48	2.66	1.03	2.19	15.15

Totals
Year	Team	GP	FG	FGA	3P	3PA	FT	FTA	REB	A	BK	ST	PTS
1999-00	Siena	28	129	309	17	79	59	92	160	48	16	45	334
2000-01	Siena	30	177	363	36	96	102	140	292	60	26	74	492
2001-02	Siena	30	198	387	37	94	119	143	314	83	49	82	552
2002-03	Siena	33	165	405	31	106	94	126	260	131	34	64	455
Career		121	669	1464	121	375	374	501	1026	322	125	265	1833

== Private life ==
In August 2011 Gunta Baško married ex-basketball player Kristaps Melnbārdis, and changed surname form Baško to Baško-Melnbārde. In February 2018 the couple divorced.
