= Volha Padabed =

Belarusian basketball player

Volha Padabed (born 24 April 1979) is a Belarusian basketball player who competed in the 2008 Summer Olympics.
