= Pelagia Papamichail =

Greek basketball player

No. 19 – Olympiacos
- Position: Center

Personal information
- Born: April 26, 1986 (age 40) Thessaloniki, Greece
- Listed height: 1.89 m (6 ft 2 in)

Career history
- ?: Gospić

Pelagia Papamichail (born April 29, 1986, in Thessaloniki, Greece) is a Greek female basketball player. She plays for Olympiacos.
