= Anna Vajda =

Retired Hungarian basketball player

Personal information
- Born: September 3, 1984 (age 42) Budapest, Hungary
- Listed height: 6 ft 3 in (1.91 m)
- Listed weight: 159 lb (72 kg)

Career information
- Playing career: 2001–2017
- Position: Power forward
- Number: 13, 14, 15

Career history
- 2001–2002: BSE Budapest
- 2002–2003: Zala Volán ZTE
- 2003–2005: MKB Sopron
- 2005–2010: MiZo Pécs
- 2010–2011: Fenerbahçe
- 2011: ZVVZ UŠK Prague
- 2011–2012: Perfumerías Avenida
- 2012–2013: Samsun B.K.
- 2013: Rivas Ecópolis
- 2013-2014: Botaş
- 2014-2015: UNI Győr
- 2015-2016: Hatay BŞB
- 2016-2017: YDÜ Melekleri

Anna Vajda (born September 3, 1984) is a retired professional basketball player. She is 1.90 m height and plays as power forward.

Vajda is the best player of the Hungary national women's basketball team. 2009–10, she led Hungary back to EuroBasket Women in the qualification campaign, then led MiZo Pécs to the Quarter-Finals of the EuroLeague Women with fantastic numbers (16.4 points and 5.9 rebounds per game). She's the top scorer of the team, the heart and soul of Hungary. But she sprained her ankle badly on 25 April 2010 and her fitness has come into question. The possible loss of this all-around player is a heart breaker for the coach. She can be one of the greatest players in Hungarian women's basketball history if she can remain healthy, which has often been a problem for her. She won 2009-10 Hungarian League with MiZo Pécs and 2010 Turkish Super Cup with Fenerbahçe Istanbul.

== Honors ==
- (Hungary) Hungarian Championship
  - Winners (2): 2005–06, 2009–10
  - Runner-up (2): 2006–07, 2007–08
- (Hungary) Hungarian Cup
  - Winners (3): 2006, 2009, 2010
  - Runner-up (2): 2004, 2008
- (Turkey) Turkish Women's Basketball League
  - Runners-up (1): 2015–16
- (Turkey) Turkish Super Cup
  - Winner (1): 2010
- (Czech Republic) Czech Championship
  - Winner (1): 2010–11
- (Spain) Spanish Cup
  - Winner (1): 2012–13
