= Ana Perović =

Serbian basketball player

Personal information
- Born: 8 July 1977 (age 49) Niš, SFR Yugoslavia
- Listed height: 1.97 m (6 ft 6 in)
- Listed weight: 90 kg (198 lb)

Career information
- WNBA draft: 1999: undrafted
- Playing career: –2011
- Position: Center

Career history
- Celta de Vigo
- 2006–2007: Dynamo Novosibirsk
- 2007: MBK Ružomberok
- 2007–2008: Budućnost Podgorica
- 2008–2010: Basket Landes
- 2010–2011: Pauk Orthez

Ana Perović (Serbian Cyrillic: Ана Перовић; born 8 July 1977) is a Serbian former female basketball player. She played for national Serbian team (2007-2009) : she scored 10.7 pts and 4.7 rbds during the Euro 2009. She played in many European championships. She played for Basket Landes 2008-2010 and then for Pau Lacq Orthez (6.8 pts, 2.2 rbds), then Mourenx, and CEP Chalosse / Elan Chalossais (2012-2017).
