= Milda Sauliūtė =

Lithuanian basketball player (born 1981)

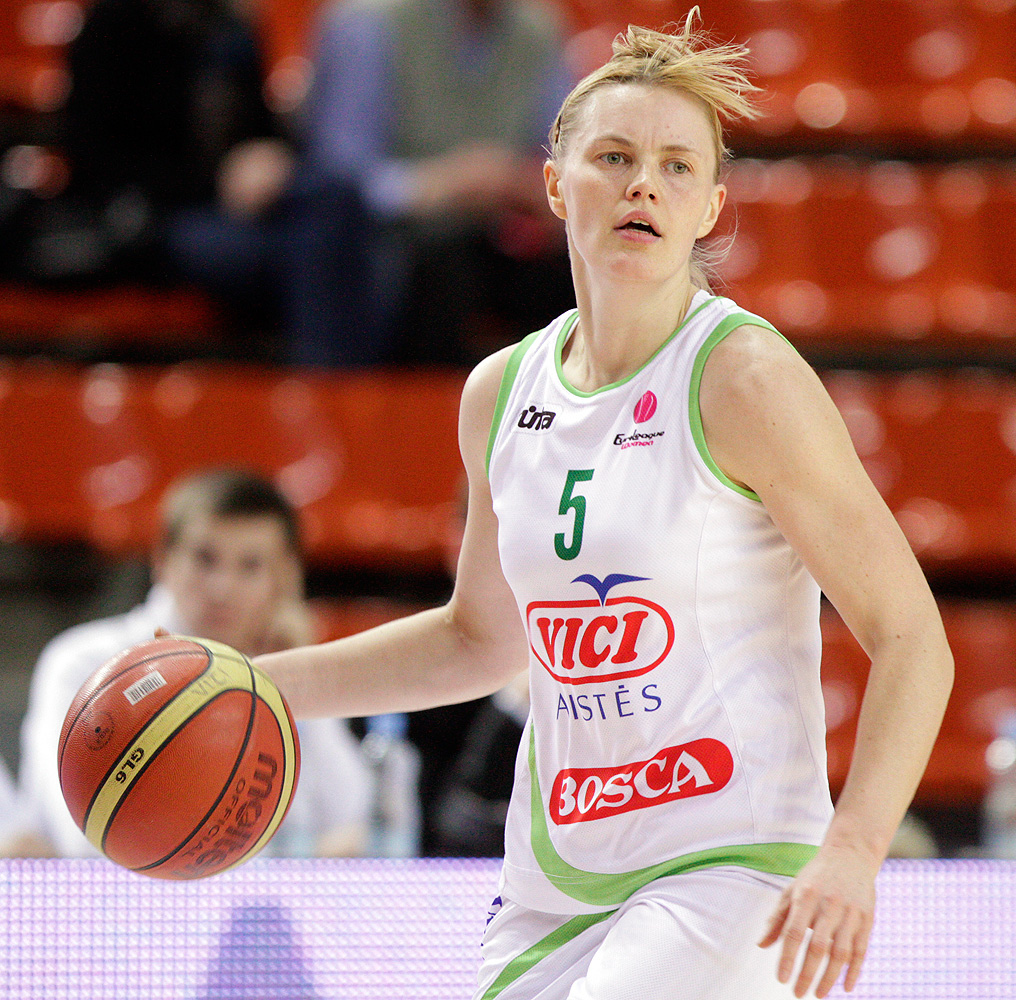

VICI Kaunas
- Positions: Point guard, Shooting guard

Personal information
- Born: August 28, 1981 (age 45) Vilnius, Lithuanian SSR, Soviet Union
- Listed height: 1.75 m (5 ft 9 in)
- Listed weight: 68 kg (150 lb)

Milda Sauliūtė (born August 8, 1981) is a Lithuanian professional basketball player. She plays for VICI Kaunas and Lithuania women's national basketball team. She has represented national team in several EuroBasket Women competitions. She has spent all her career in Lithuania.

== Clubs ==
- 1998–99: Vilniaus Svaja
- 1999–2000: Alytaus Snaigė
- 2000–01: Vilniaus Lintel 118
- 2001–02: Vilniaus Lintel 118
- 2002–03: Vilniaus Lintel 118
- 2004–05: Marijampolės Arvi (LMKL)
- 2005–06: Marijampolės Arvi (LMKL)
- 2006–07: Kauno Laisvė (LMKL)
- 2008–09: Marijampolės Arvi (LMKL)
- 2009–10: Vilniaus TEO (LMKL)
- 2010–11: Kauno VIČI-Aistės(LMKL)
- 2018-19: Kauno Aistės-LSMU (Moterų lyga)
