= Raffaella Masciadri =

Italian basketball player

No. 11 – PF Schio
- Position: Small forward
- League: LegA

Personal information
- Born: 30 September 1980 (age 46) Como, Italy
- Listed height: 6 ft 1 in (1.85 m)
- Stats at Basketball Reference

Raffaella Masciadri (born 30 September 1980) is an Italian basketball player for PF Schio and the Italian national team.

She participated at the EuroBasket Women 2017.
