= EuroBasket Women 2005 =

2005 edition of EuroBasket Women

EuroBasket 2005 Women
30th FIBA European Women's Basketball Championship
- Eurobasket Women 2005 logo

Tournament details
- Host country: Turkey
- Dates: September 2–11
- Teams: 12
- Venues: 3 (in 3 host cities)

Final positions
- Champions: Czech Republic (1st title)
- Runners-up: Russia
- Third place: Spain
- Fourth place: Lithuania

Tournament statistics
- MVP: (Russia) Maria Stepanova
- Top scorer: (Spain) Amaya Valdemoro 21.6
- Top rebounds: (Turkey) Nevriye Yılmaz 11.3
- Top assists: (France) Catherine Melain 5.1
- PPG (Team): Russia 77.3
- RPG (Team): Russia 43.7
- APG (Team): France 16.9

Official website
- Official website

The 2005 European Women Basketball Championship, commonly called Eurobasket 2005 Women, was held in Turkey between 2 September and 11 September 2005. Czech Republic won the gold medal and Russia the silver medal while Spain won the bronze. Maria Stepanova from Russia was named the tournament MVP.

The FIBA European Women's Basketball Championship is a bi-annual women's basketball competition between national teams organised by FIBA Europe, the sport's governing body in Europe. This was the first time that the championship was hosted by Turkey.

== Venues ==
Venues Map

=== Ankara ===
Ankara, the capital of Turkey and the country's second largest city, was the final stage of the Eurobasket 2005 Women action. The Ankara Atatürk Sport Hall with a capacity of 4,500 people hosted 16 games of the competition following the preliminary round.

=== Bursa ===
Turkey's fourth most populous city Bursa was home to Group A during the tournament, and also had a total of 15 games played in the 3,500 person capacity Bursa Atatürk Sport Hall.

=== İzmir ===
İzmir is the third largest city of Turkey. İzmir Atatürk Sport Hall with a capacity of 3,000 persons hosted Group B, where 15 games were played.

== Qualification ==
For details on qualification, see Eurobasket 2005 Women qualification.

== Final round ==
=== Preliminaries ===
==== Group A – Atatürk Sport Hall, Bursa ====
Team	Pld	W	L	PF	PA	PD	Pts
Czech Republic	5	5	0	342	241	+101	10
France	5	4	1	345	282	+63	9
Latvia	5	3	2	323	319	+4	8
Poland	5	2	3	297	327	−30	7
Greece	5	1	4	272	328	−56	6
Germany	5	0	5	282	364	−82	5

September 2, 2005
Poland	62 – 75	Latvia	16:00
Germany	61 – 66	Greece	18:15
France	45 – 65	Czech Republic	20:30
September 3, 2005
Latvia	77 – 67	Germany	16:00
Czech Republic	64 – 47	Poland	18:15
Greece	56 – 71	France	20:30
September 4, 2005
Germany	56 – 66	Poland	16:00
Greece	54 – 61	Czech Republic	18:15
France	67 – 50	Latvia	20:30
September 6, 2005
Czech Republic	76 – 50	Germany	16:00
Latvia	76 – 47	Greece	18:15
Poland	63 – 83	France	20:30
September 7, 2005
Latvia	45 – 76	Czech Republic	16:00
Greece	49 – 59	Poland	18:15
France	79 – 48	Germany	20:30

==== Group B – Atatürk Sport Hall, İzmir ====
Team	Pld	W	L	PF	PA	PD	Pts
Lithuania	5	4	1	402	345	+57	9
Spain	5	4	1	397	320	+77	9
Russia	5	3	2	413	379	+34	8
Turkey	5	2	3	374	384	−10	7
Serbia and Montenegro	5	2	3	330	360	−30	7
Romania	5	0	5	283	411	−128	5

September 2, 2005
Romania	60 – 92	Russia	16:00
Lithuania	74 – 69	Spain	18:15
Turkey	81 – 69	Serbia and Montenegro	20:30
September 3, 2005
Spain	98 – 53	Romania	16:00
Serba and Montenegro	77 – 74	Lithuania	18:15
Russia	91 – 87	Turkey	20:30
September 4, 2005
Romania	50 – 63	Serbia and Montenegro	16:00
Spain	83 – 77, OT	Russia	18:15
Lithuania	82 – 76	Turkey	20:30
September 6, 2005
Russia	67 – 80	Lithuania	16:00
Serbia and Montenegro	52 – 69	Spain	18:15
Turkey	66 – 64	Romania	20:30
September 7, 2005
Serbia and Montenegro	69 – 86	Russia	16:00
Romania	56 – 92	Lithuania	18:15
Spain	78 – 64	Turkey	20:30

=== Finals – Atatürk Sport Hall, Ankara ===
Quarter-finals
Czech Republic	86
Turkey	60
Spain	69
Latvia	50
Lithuania	67
Poland	58
France	56
Russia	70

Semi-finals
Czech Republic	76
Spain	66
Lithuania	50
Russia	65

Final
Czech Republic	72
Russia	70
Third place
Spain	83
Lithuania	65

5th to 8th place

Classification round
Turkey	78
Latvia	81
Poland	71
France	73

Fifth place
Latvia	62
France	85
Seventh place
Turkey	71
Poland	82

9th to 12th place

Classification round
Greece	67
Romania	61
Serbia and Montenegro	73
Germany	57

Ninth place
Greece	65
Serbia and Montenegro	79
Eleventh place
Romania	64
Germany	98

==== Quarter-finals ====
September 9, 2005
Lithuania	67 – 58	Poland	13:45
Spain	69 – 50	Latvia	16:00
France	56 – 70	Russia	18:15
Czech Republic	86 – 60	Turkey	20:30

==== Classification 9–12 ====
September 10, 2005
Greece	67 – 61	Romania	09:15
Serbia and Montenegro	73 – 57	Germany	11:30

==== Classification 5–8 ====
September 10, 2005
Poland	71 – 73	France	13:45
Turkey	78 – 81	Latvia	16:00

==== Semi-finals ====
September 10, 2005
Lithuania	50 – 65	Russia	18:15
Czech Republic	76 – 66	Spain	20:20

==== Finals ====
September 11, 2005
11th-place match
Romania	64 – 98	Germany	09:15
9th-place match
Greece	65 – 79	Serbia and Montenegro	11:30
7th-place match
Turkey	71 – 82, OT	Poland	13:45
5th-place match
Latvia	62 – 85	France	16:00
Bronze Medal Match
Spain	83 – 65	Lithuania	18:15
Championship Match
Czech Republic	72 – 70	Russia	20:30

11 September 2005
20:30

Boxscore

Czech Republic	72–70	Russia
Scoring by quarter: 18–24, 13–19, 24–17, 17–10

Ankara Atatürk Sport Hall, Ankara (TUR)
Attendance: 1000
Referees: Kestutis Pilipauskas (LTU), Vicente Bulto (ESP)

2005 FIBA European champions

Czech Republic
1st title

== Conclusion ==
=== Final standings ===
Pos	Team	Pld	W	L	PF	PA	PD	Pts
1st place, gold medalist(s)	Czech Republic	8	8	0	576	437	+139	16
2nd place, silver medalist(s)	Russia	8	5	3	618	557	+61	13
3rd place, bronze medalist(s)	Spain	8	6	2	615	511	+104	14
4	Lithuania	8	5	3	584	551	+33	13
5	France	8	6	2	559	485	+74	14
6	Latvia	8	4	4	516	551	–35	12
7	Poland	8	3	5	508	538	–30	11
8	Turkey	8	2	6	583	633	–50	10
9	Serbia and Montenegro	7	4	3	482	482	0	11
10	Greece	7	2	5	404	468	–64	9
11	Germany	7	1	6	437	501	–64	8
12	Romania	7	0	7	408	576	–168	7

=== All-Eurobasket 2005 Women Awards ===
- MVP: Maria Stepanova ( Russia)
- Best Center: Maria Stepanova ( Russia)
- Best Forward: Amaya Valdemoro ( Spain)
- Best Guard: Hana Machová ( Czech Republic)

==== 1st Team ====
- Maria Stepanova ( Russia)
- Tatiana Shchegoleva ( Russia)
- Amaya Valdemoro ( Spain)
- Hana Machová ( Czech Republic)
- Eva Vítečková ( Czech Republic)

==== 2nd Team ====
- Anna Montañana ( Spain)
- Agnieszka Bibrzycka ( Poland)
- Sandra Valužytė ( Lithuania)
- Anete Jekabsone ( Latvia)
- Audrey Sauret-Gillespie ( France)

==== Honorable Mention ====
- Michaela Pavlíčková ( Czech Republic)
- Eva Němcová ( Czech Republic)
- Ilona Korstin ( Russia)
- Marta Fernández ( Spain)
- Iveta Marcauskaite ( Lithuania)
- Sandra Le Dréan ( France)
- Nevriye Yılmaz ( Turkey)
- Ivana Matović ( Serbia and Montenegro)
- Biljana Stanković ( Serbia and Montenegro)
- Evanthia Maltsi ( Greece)
- Linda Fröhlich ( Germany)

=== Top 10 scorers ===
Rank	Player	Team	Games	Score	PPG
1	Amaya Valdemoro	Spain	8	173	21.6
2	Agnieszka Bibrzycka	Poland	8	159	19.9
3	Anete Jekabsone	Latvia	8	157	19.6
4	Nevriye Yılmaz	Turkey	8	156	19.5
5	Maria Stepanova	Russia	8	144	18.0
6	Linda Fröhlich	Germany	7	115	16.4
7	Eva Vítečková	Czech Republic	8	119	14.9
8	Sandra Valužyte	Lithuania	8	108	13.5
9	Evanthia Maltsi	Greece	7	92	13.1
10	Ildiko Vass	Romania	7	91	13.0

=== Statistical leaders ===
Category	Player	Team	Average
Points per game	Amaya Valdemoro	Spain	21.6
Total rebounds	Nevriye Yılmaz	Turkey	11.3
Assists	Catherine Melain	France	5.1
Steals	Amaya Valdemoro	Spain	3.1
Turnovers	Gunta Baško	Latvia	4.9
Blocked shots	Gabriela Toma	Romania	2.6
