= Catherine Melain =

French basketball player

Medal record

Representing France

European Championships
Gold medal – first place	2001 France	Team
Gold medal – first place	2009 Latvia	Team
Silver medal – second place	1999 Poland	Team

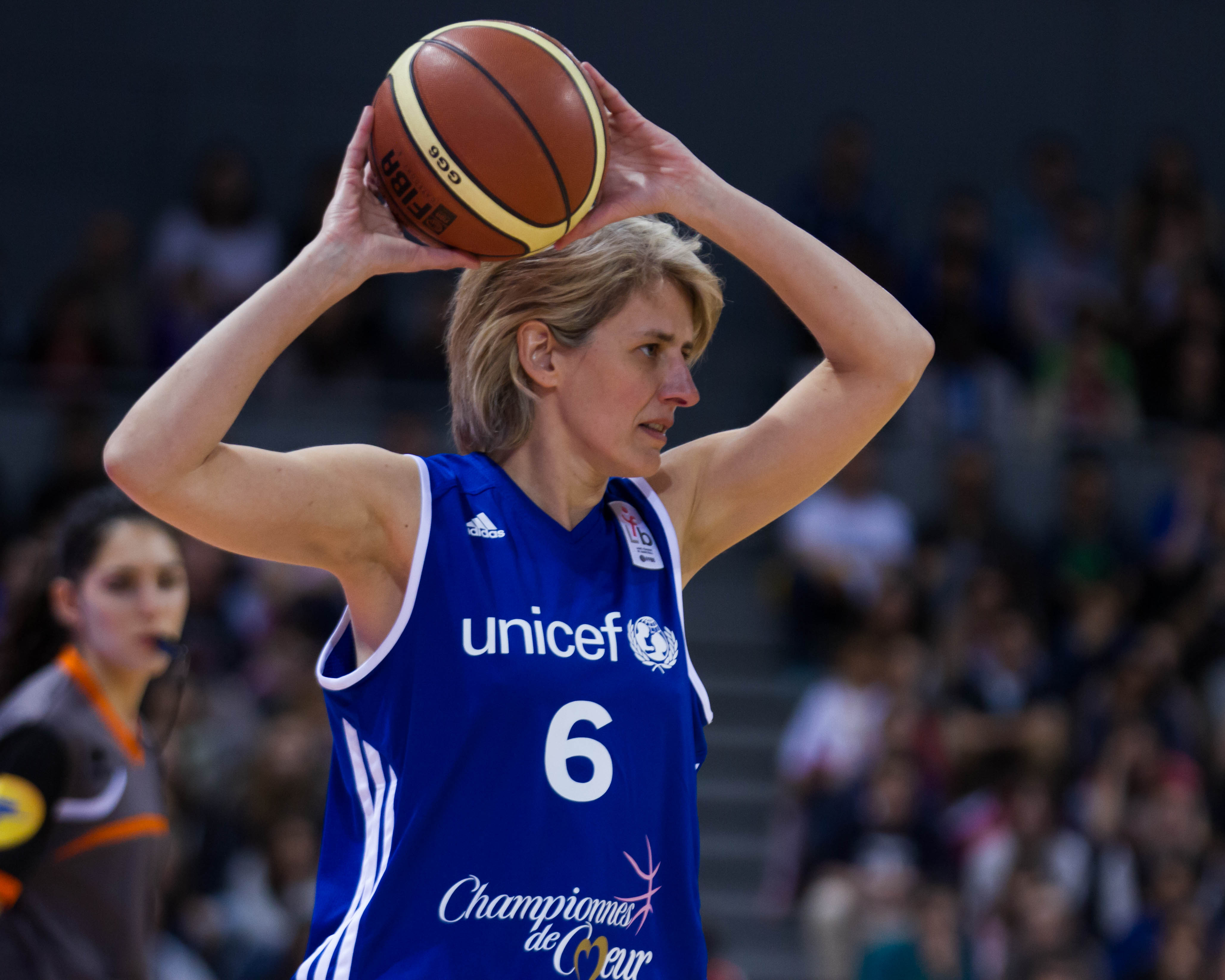

Catherine Melain (born 19 May 1974) is a French former basketball player who competed in the 2000 Summer Olympics. She was born in Rennes. She was inducted into the French Basketball Hall of Fame in 2014.
