= Laura Macchi =

Italian basketball player (born 1979)

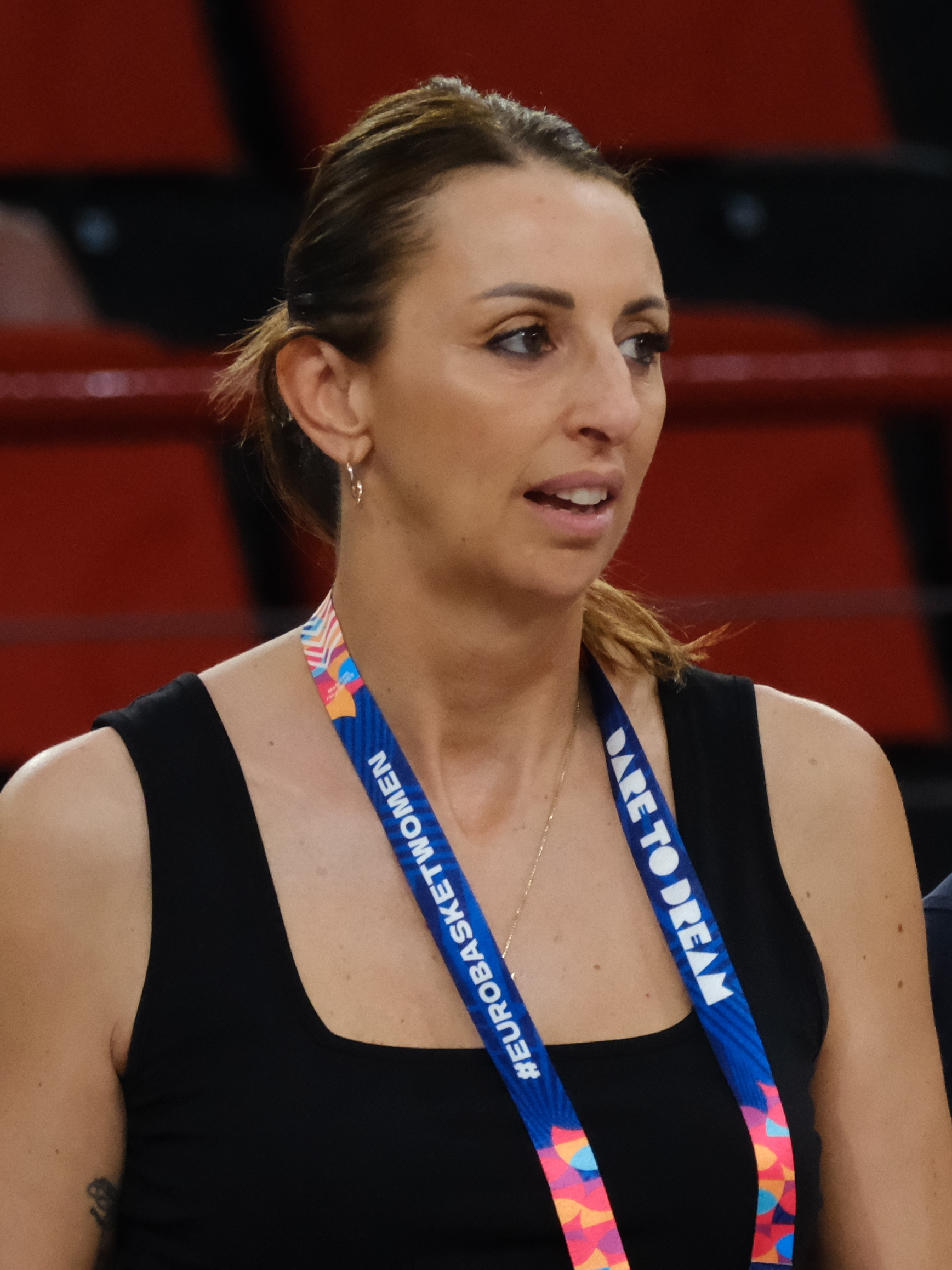
- Macchi in 2025

No. 25 – PF Schio
- Position: Power forward
- League: LegA

Personal information
- Born: May 24, 1979 (age 47) Varese, Italy
- Listed height: 1.88 m (6 ft 2 in)

Career history
- 2004–2005: Los Angeles Sparks
- Stats at Basketball Reference

Laura Macchi (born May 24, 1979) is an Italian professional basketball player who played for the Los Angeles Sparks of the WNBA.

== WNBA stats ==
Year	Team	Games	Games started	Minutes played	Field Goal%	3-point%	Free throw%	Total rebounds	Assists	Steals	Blocks	Turnovers	Points
2004	LAS	25	15	410	.491	.269	.745	61	14	21	6	29	152
2005	LAS	13	1	148	.396	.321	.706	18	7	8	1	13	63
