= Zane Tamane =

Latvian basketball player (born 1983)

No. 14 – Nadezhda Orenburg
- League: Premier League

Personal information
- Born: September 24, 1983 (age 43) Latvian SSR, USSR (now Latvia)
- Listed height: 6 ft 7 in (2.01 m)
- Listed weight: 176 lb (80 kg)

Career information
- College: Western Illinois (2002–2006)
- WNBA draft: 2006: 3rd round, 35th overall pick
- Drafted by: Detroit Shock
- Playing career: 1999–present

Career history
- 1999–2003: RTU/Klondaika Rīga
- 2006: Washington Mystics
- 2006–2007: Universitat F.C. Barcelona
- 2007–2008: Hondarribia Irun
- 2008–2009: Nadežda Orenburg
- 2009–2010: ZVVZ USK Blex Praha
- 2010–2011: MKB Euroleasing Sopron
- 2011–2012: Fenerbahçe Istanbul
- 2012: Phoenix Mercury
- 2012–present: Nadezhda Orenburg
- Stats at WNBA.com
- Stats at Basketball Reference

Zane Tamane (née Teilāne; born September 24, 1983) is a Latvian women's basketball player currently playing for Nadezhda Orenburg and Latvia women's national basketball team.

Tamane, who is 2.00m tall, was the first female basketball player in Latvia to be able to slam dunk in practice. She has played for the Washington Mystics in the WNBA, and was in the 2012 training camp with the Phoenix Mercury, but was waived. She has also represented Western Illinois Leathernecks in the NCAA.

== Western Illinois statistics ==
Legend
GP	Games played	GS	Games started	MPG	Minutes per game
FG%	Field goal percentage	3P%	3-point field goal percentage	FT%	Free throw percentage
RPG	Rebounds per game	APG	Assists per game	SPG	Steals per game
BPG	Blocks per game	PPG	Points per game	**Bold**	Career high

Year	Team	GP	Points	FG%	3P%	FT%	RPG	APG	SPG	BPG	PPG
2002–03	Western Illinois	19	212	**60.9%**	0.0%	62.5%	6.1	1.1	0.4	3.8	11.2
2003–04	Western Illinois	29	405	56.9%	0.0%	71.4%	9.4	1.5	0.8	3.9	14.0
2004–05	Western Illinois	28	438	52.2%	0.0%	**82.7%**	9.3	2.1	**1.4**	3.4	15.6
2005–06	Western Illinois	**30**	**492**	47.8%	0.0%	78.1%	**10.7**	**3.2**	1.3	**4.2**	**16.4**
Career		106	1547	52.9%	0.0%	75.2%	9.1	2.1	1.0	3.8	14.6
