= Agnieszka Bibrzycka =

Polish basketball player

Personal information
- Born: October 21, 1982 (age 44) Mikołów, Poland
- Listed height: 6 ft 0 in (1.83 m)
- Listed weight: 168 lb (76 kg)

Career information
- Playing career: 2001–present
- Position: Guard / forward

Career history
- 2001–2006: Lotos Gdynia
- 2004–2006: San Antonio Silver Stars
- 2006–2007: WBC Spartak Moscow Region
- 2007–2011: UMMC Ekaterinburg
- 2011–2012: CCC Polkowice
- 2012–2015: Fenerbahçe Istanbul
- 2015–2016: Lotos Gdynia
- Stats at Basketball Reference

Agnieszka Danuta "Biba" Bibrzycka (born October 10, 1982) is a basketball player who played for Fenerbahçe Istanbul of the Turkish Women's Basketball League.

== Career ==
- (Poland) Lotos Gdynia (2001–06)
  - Polish Championship: 2002, 2003, 2004, 2005
  - Polish Cup: 2005
- (United States) San Antonio Silver Stars (2004–06)
- (Russia) WBC Spartak Moscow Region (2006–07)
  - EuroLeague Women: 2007
  - Russian Championship: 2007
- (Russia) UMMC Ekaterinburg (2007–11)
  - Russian Championship: 2009, 2010, 2011
  - Russian Cup: 2009, 2010, 2011
- (Poland) CCC Polkowice (2011–12)
- (Turkey) Fenerbahçe Istanbul (2012–present)
  - Turkish Women's Basketball League: 2012-2013
  - Turkish Super Cup: 2013, 2014
  - Turkish Cup: 2015

== WNBA ==
Biba played for the San Antonio Silver Stars during 2004-05 and 2006-07 seasons.

== Career statistics ==
Legend
GP	Games played	GS	Games started	MPG	Minutes per game	RPG	Rebounds per game
APG	Assists per game	SPG	Steals per game	BPG	Blocks per game	PPG	Points per game
TO	Turnovers per game	FG%	Field-goal percentage	3P%	3-point field-goal percentage	FT%	Free-throw percentage
**Bold**	Career best	°	League leader

=== WNBA ===
==== Regular season ====
Year	Team	GP	GS	MPG	FG%	3P%	FT%	RPG	APG	SPG	BPG	TO	PPG
2004	San Antonio	24	9	19.4	.364	.310	**.885**	1.2	**1.7**	**.9**	.3	**1.3**	6.6
2006	San Antonio	**32**	**22**	**23.5**	**.418**	**.350**	.818	**2.1**	1.5	.8	**.4**	1.5	**11.3**
Career	2 years, 1 team	56	31	21.7	.400	.336	.873	1.7	1.6	.8	.3	1.4	9.3
