= EuroBasket Women 1966 squads =

This article displays the rosters for the teams competing at the EuroBasket Women 1966.

== Group A ==
=== Yugoslavia ===
Yugoslavia roster
Players
Coaches

Pos.	No.	Name	Age – Date of birth	Height	Club
	4	Marjana Bremec Homar	–
	5	Jelica Kalenić	–
	6	Anika Bašić	–
	7	Olga Đoković	–
	8	Jasna Selimović	–
	9	Ružica Meglaj-Rimac	–
	10	Milica Radovanović	–
	11	Stanka Stošić	–
	12	Marija Veger	–
	13	Žeravica Zagorka	–
	14	Nataša Bebić	–
	15	Kaćuša Buljan	–

Head coach

Ladislav Demšar

Legend

- (C) Team captain
- Injured
