= Lithuania women's national basketball team =

Women's national basketball team representing Lithuania

Lithuania
- FIBA ranking: 33 ▼2 (18 March 2026)
- Joined FIBA: 1936; 90 years ago
- FIBA zone: FIBA Europe
- National federation: LKF
- Coach: Vilius Stanišauskas
- Nickname(s): The Second Religion, Game of the Nation

World Cup
- Appearances: 3

EuroBasket Women
- Appearances: 12
- Medals: (gold) Gold: (1997); (silver) Silver: (1938)
Home	Away

First international
- Lithuania 15–7 Estonia (1938)

The Lithuania women's national basketball team (Lithuanian: Lietuvos nacionalinė moterų krepšinio rinktinė) represents Lithuania in international women's basketball competitions. They are regulated by the Lithuanian Basketball Federation, the governing body for basketball in Lithuania.

The team is currently ranked 31st in the FIBA World Rankings.

== History ==
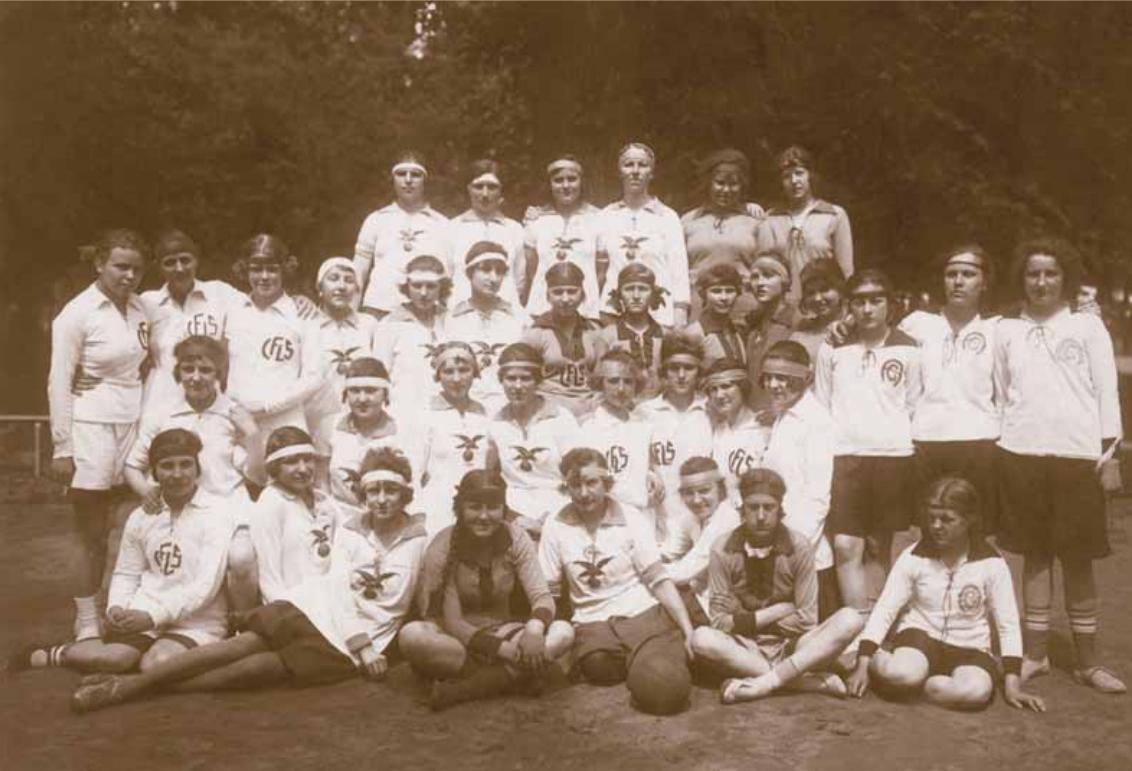
The very first basketball players in Lithuania were women. Photo from 1923.

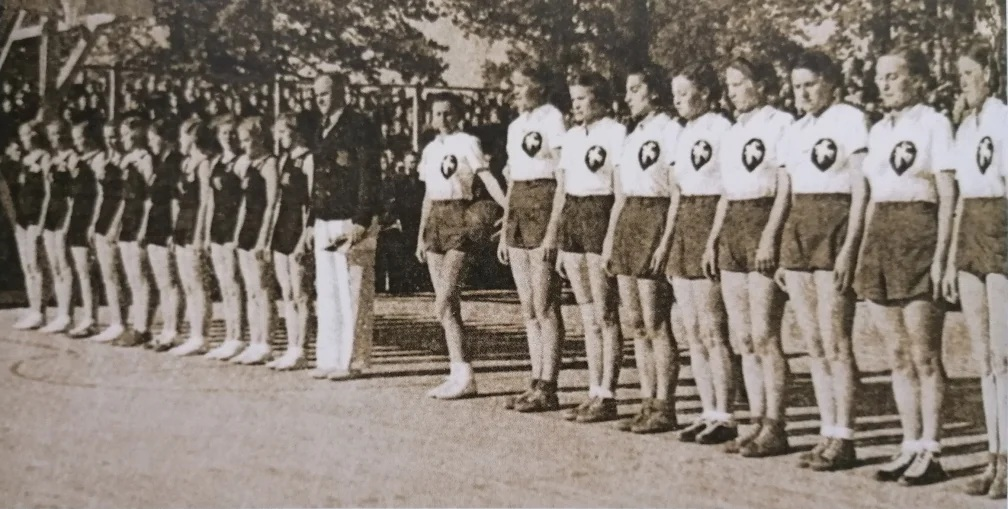
Lithuanians before their first international game versus Estonians in 1938

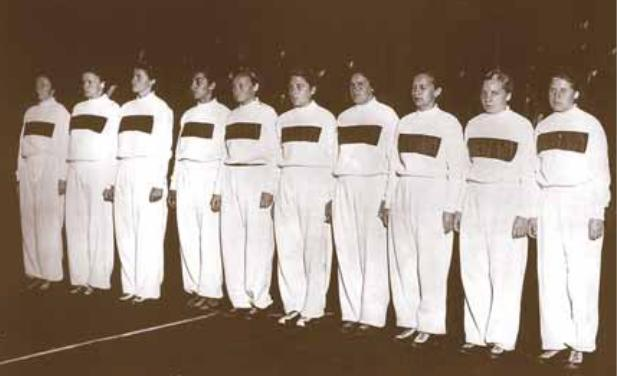
Lithuania national team during EuroBasket 1938 in Rome, Italy

Basketball first reached Lithuania when the game was already 30 years old. The version originally played was the German (Dutch) variant, not the North American version invented by James Naismith. The baskets were fastened to the poles without boards, and the game was played in a huge court. One of the Lithuanian sport pioneers, Steponas Garbačiauskas, wrote: "In 1919 Lithuanian women athletes started organizing, but they showed up publicly only in 1920–1921 and started playing basketball." Though women started playing basketball in Lithuania before men did, the first official game was played by men on April 23, 1922, when Lietuvos Fizinio Lavinimo Sąjunga (English: Lithuanian Physical Education Union) played a game against Kaunas. LFLS won the game with a score of 8–6. This day is regarded as the beginning of basketball in Lithuania. The first official women's basketball game in Lithuania took place on September 10, 1922.

The first European women's basketball championship was organized in 1938. It was held in Rome, Italy. The Lithuanian women's squad competed and became European vice-champions. The team's head coach was Feliksas Kriaučiūnas, already well known for his achievements with the Lithuanian men's basketball team.

After World War II, the Soviet Union occupied Lithuania and forced it to play for the Soviet Union women's national basketball team. The best Lithuanian players, playing for the Soviet Union national basketball team, won several titles with it. As members of Soviet Union team, Lithuanians (men and women) in total won 17 Olympic medals (8 gold, 6 silver and 3 bronze), 17 World championship medals (11 gold, 5 silver and one bronze), and 51 EuroBasket medals (36 gold, 4 silver and 11 bronze). The most decorated Lithuanian players during the Soviet era were Angelė Rupšienė, who won the first two women's Olympic basketball golds in 1976 and 1980 and also the 1971, 1975 Women's World Cup, and Vida Beselienė, who got an Olympic gold in 1980 and the 1983 Women's World Cup. Other Lithuanian world champions were Jurate Daktaraitė (1959), Larissa Vinčaitė (1971), and Chamomile Šidlauskaitė (1983).

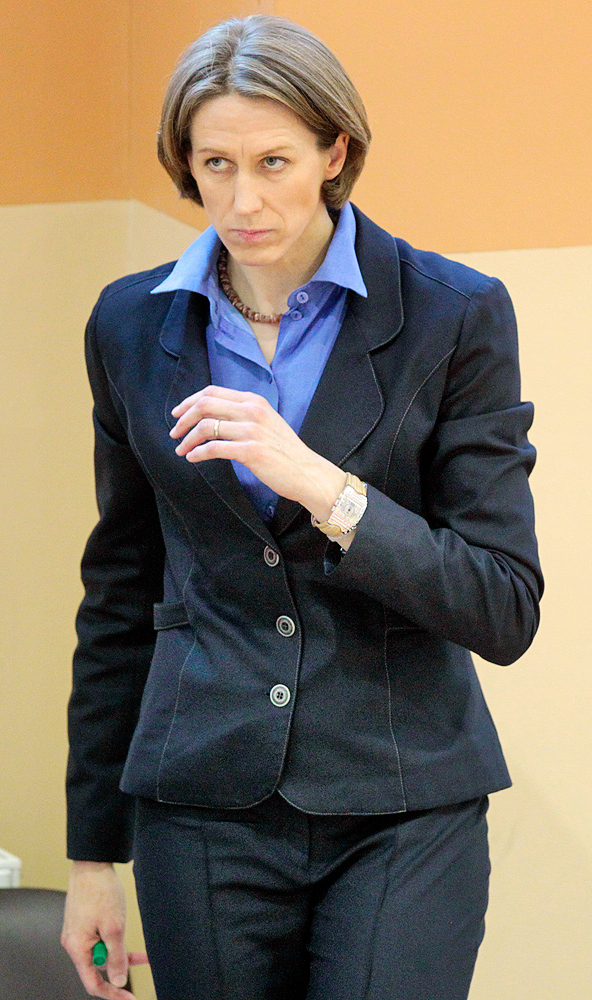
Jurgita Štreimikytė, former WNBA player, one of the 1997's team leaders.

Lithuania women's national basketball team returned to FIBA games only in EuroBasket 1995 and achieved the 5th place.

The team's biggest success was achieved two years later in EuroBasket 1997 when the national team, coached by Vydas Gedvilas, became the European champions in Budapest. It was the first and the only European title for the Lithuanian women's basketball squad.

A Year later, Lithuania participated in the 1998 FIBA Women's World Cup. Despite successful European competition, Lithuanians lost the quarter-finals game to 1994's World champions, Brazil's national team, 70–72 and had to play for fifth place. There they lost to Spain 59–70 and took only 8th place.

At the EuroBasket Women 1999, Lithuania took 6th place and failed to qualify for the 2000 Summer Olympics, held in Sydney.

In EuroBasket 2001 Women, Lithuanians qualified for four best tournament's teams, though losing the bronze medals game to Spain 74–89. Yet the team qualified for the 2002 FIBA Women's World Cup, held in China.

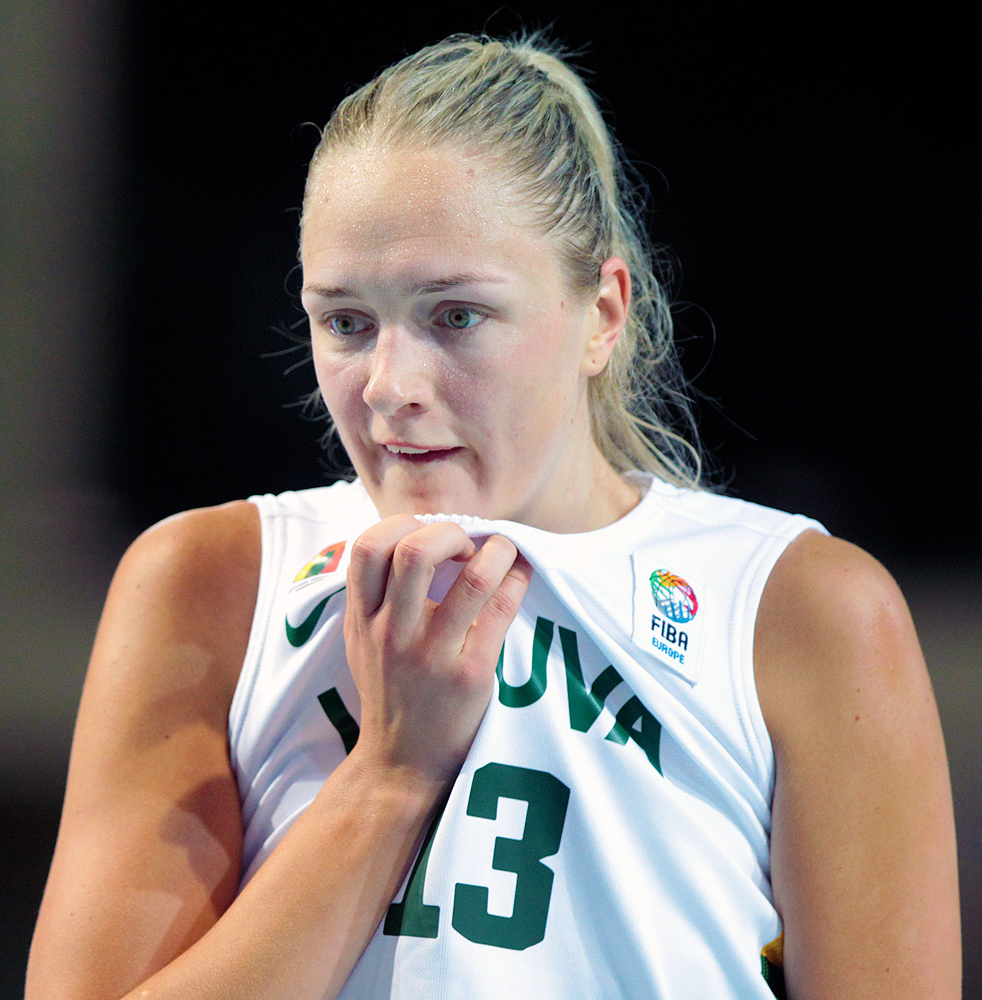
Gintarė Petronytė with the Lithuania national team jersey

At the Women's World Cup, Lithuania played eight matches and won three, against Taiwan, Cuba and Yugoslavia. They took 11th place. As a consequence, Lithuanian Basketball Federation decided to end collaboration with Vydas Gedvilas. In 2003, LKF Executive Committee chose Algirdas Paulauskas as the new Lithuania women's national basketball team coach. He was working previously as an assistant coach in the national team until the 1996 World Championship when he decided to leave the squad due to poor performance.

At EuroBasket Women 2005, held in Turkey, Lithuania, losing their last two matches, to finish in 4th place. Although, they returned to Lithuania with the voucher to the 2006 FIBA Women's World Cup, held in Brazil.

At their third Women's World Cup appearance, the Lithuanians lost the 5th-place game to France and took 6th place, repeating the best performance achieved back in 1998.

At EuroBasket Women 2007, the Lithuanians were crushed in the 5th-place game against Czech Republic with result 54–93 and lost all chances of competing for the ticket to the 2008 Summer Olympics, held in Beijing. Algirdas Paulauskas left the squad for the second time that year.

In 2007, a sculpture dedicated to the Lithuanian basketball was introduced in Vilnius, near the Siemens Arena. It has carved names of Elena Kubiliūnaitė-Garbačiauskienė, Ona Bartkevičiūtė-Butautienė, Jūratė Daktaraitė, Angelė Jankūnaitė-Rupšienė, Vida Šulskytė-Beselienė, Jurgita Štreimikytė-Virbickienė, Lina Dambrauskaitė and Irena Baranauskaitė.

In EuroBasket Women 2009, the Lithuanian women's national team suffered a fiasco, just like the men's squad. The Lithuanian national team took 9th–12th place after not reaching the knockout stage for the first time. After the European championship Algirdas Paulauskas returned to the Lithuanian squad once again.

At EuroBasket Women 2011, the Lithuanians showed signs of hope again, reaching the knockout stage, however there they were eliminated by the French national team 58–66 and took 7th place. Because of that, Lithuania lost all the possibilities to qualify into the 2012 Summer Olympics, held in London. To this day, Lithuania women's national basketball team never participated in the Olympic Games, despite the several appearances in the World championships and successful European championships.

Tough times returned to the Lithuanian squad at EuroBasket Women 2013 where they took only 14th place and were unable to participate in the 2014 FIBA Women's World Cup, held in Turkey. By far, it is the worst performance for the national team.

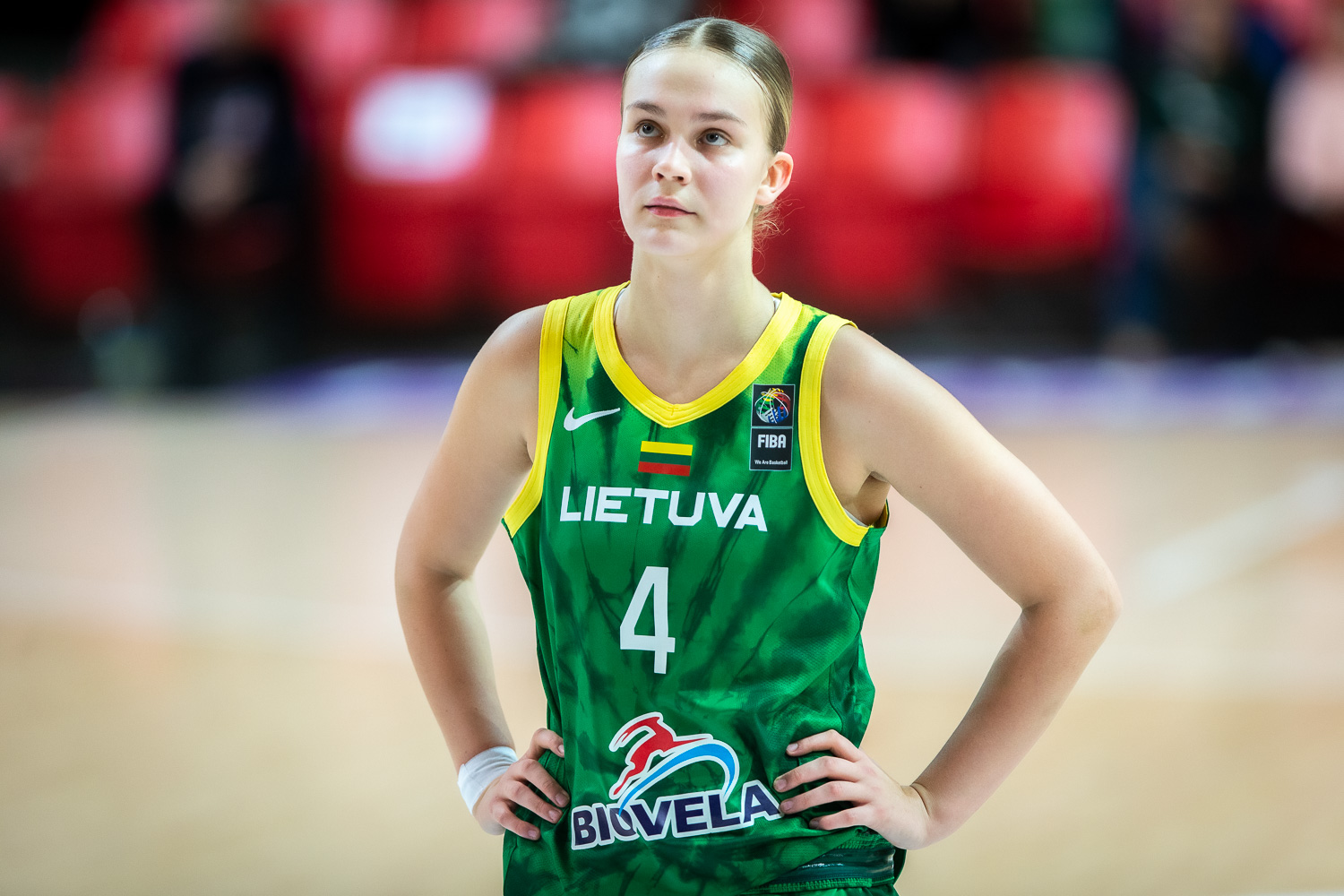
Justė Jocytė, the highest female Lithuanian WNBA draft pick (#5 in 2025), since the EuroBasket Women 2025 qualification became the leader of the Lithuania women's national basketball team

Lithuania's national team qualified to EuroBasket Women 2015, which was held on 11–28 June in Hungary and Romania, after defeating Great Britain 70–63. The team's main aim was to qualify for the 2016 Summer Olympics. They began the journey successfully by taking the 2nd place in the second stage, though in the quarterfinal they were defeated by Belarus 66–68. Lithuania then lost two more matches while playing for 5th-8th place and finished only 8th. That result eliminated the dream of the Lithuania women's national team from competing at the Olympics once again.

Lithuania's national team is now expecting for a potential qualification for the 2028 Summer Olympics after a big boost by being awarded as one of the co-hosts for the EuroBasket Women 2027 alongside Belgium, Finland and Sweden.

== Competition record ==
=== FIBA Women's EuroBasket ===
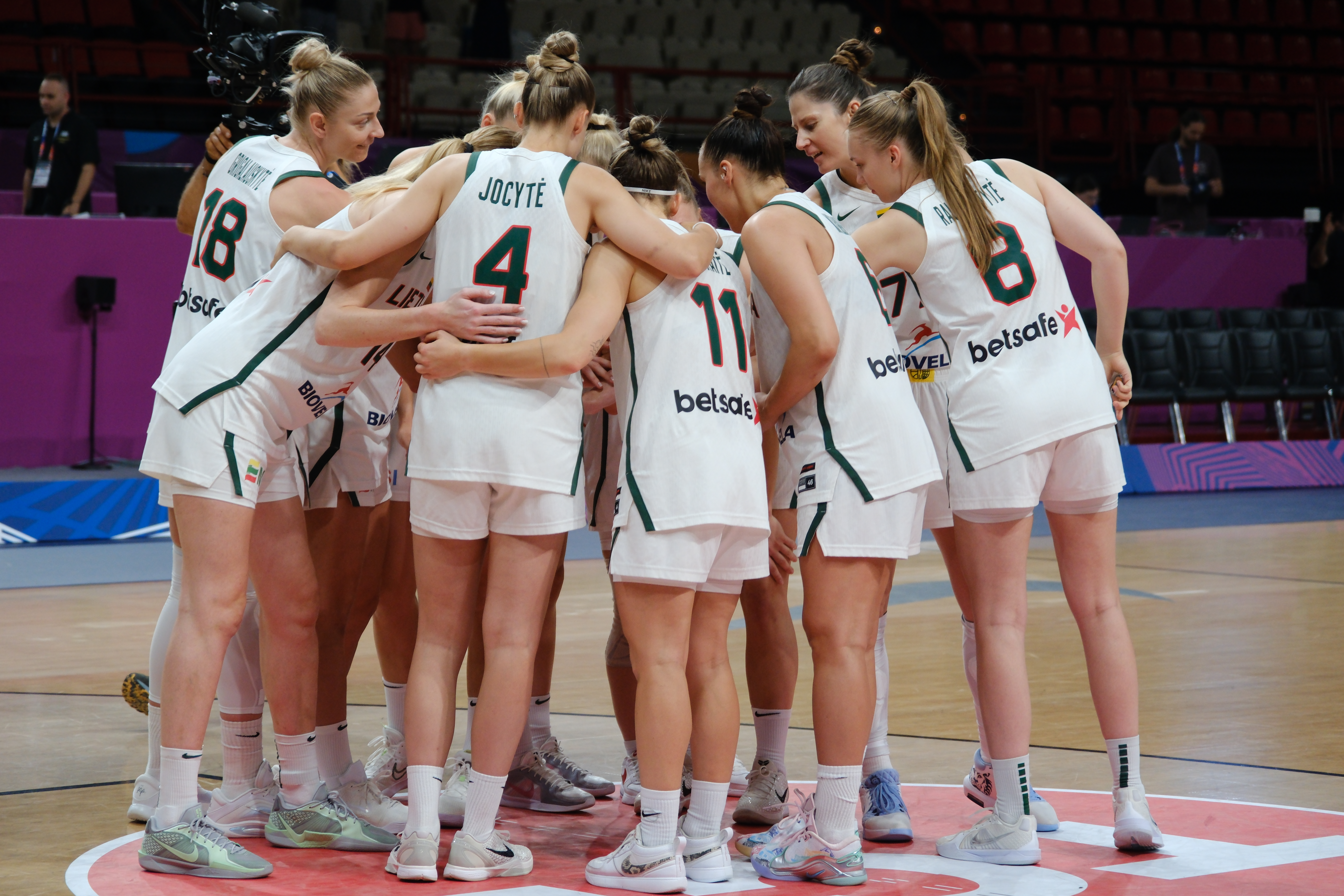
Lithuania women's national basketball team in 2025

FIBA Women's EuroBasket
Year	Position	Pld	W	L
(Italy) 1938	Silver medal	4	3	1
(Hungary) 1950	See Soviet Union			
(Soviet Union) 1952	See Soviet Union			
(Socialist Federal Republic of Yugoslavia) 1954	See Soviet Union			
(Czechoslovakia) 1956	See Soviet Union			
(Poland) 1958	See Soviet Union			
(Bulgaria) 1960	See Soviet Union			
(France) 1962	See Soviet Union			
(Hungary) 1964	See Soviet Union			
(Romania) 1966	See Soviet Union			
(Italy) 1968	See Soviet Union			
(Netherlands) 1970	See Soviet Union			
(Bulgaria) 1972	See Soviet Union			
(Italy) 1974	See Soviet Union			
(France) 1976	See Soviet Union			
(Poland) 1978	See Soviet Union			
(Socialist Federal Republic of Yugoslavia) 1980	See Soviet Union			
(Italy) 1981	See Soviet Union			
(Hungary) 1983	See Soviet Union			
(Italy) 1985	See Soviet Union			
(Spain) 1987	See Soviet Union			
(Bulgaria) 1989	See Soviet Union			
(Israel) 1991	See Soviet Union			
(Italy) 1993	Did not qualify			
(Czech Republic) 1995	5th	17	11	7
(Hungary) 1997	Gold medal	13	10	3
(Poland) 1999	6th	8	6	2
(France) 2001	4th	8	5	3
(Greece) 2003	Did not qualify			
(Turkey) 2005	4th	8	5	3
(Italy) 2007	6th	11	5	6
(Latvia) 2009	11th	8	1	7
(Poland) 2011	7th	11	7	4
(France) 2013	14th	3	1	2
(Hungary) (Romania) 2015	8th	12	5	7
(Czech Republic) 2017	Did not qualify			
(Latvia) (Serbia) 2019	Did not qualify			
(France) (Spain) 2021	Did not qualify			
(Israel) (Slovenia) 2023	Did not qualify			
(Czech Republic) (Germany) (Greece) (Italy) 2025	8th	6	2	4
(Belgium) (Finland) (Lithuania) (Sweden) 2027	Qualified as co-host			
Total	Gold medal	49	15	34

=== FIBA Women's Basketball World Cup ===
FIBA Women's Basketball World Cup
Year	Position	Pld	W	L
(Chile) 1953	See Soviet Union			
(Brazil) 1957	See Soviet Union			
1959	See Soviet Union			
(Peru) 1964	See Soviet Union			
(Czechoslovakia) 1967	See Soviet Union			
(Brazil) 1971	See Soviet Union			
(Colombia) 1975	See Soviet Union			
(South Korea) 1979	See Soviet Union			
(Brazil) 1983	See Soviet Union			
(Soviet Union) 1986	See Soviet Union			
(Malaysia) 1990	See Soviet Union			
(Australia) 1994	Did not qualify			
(Germany) 1998	6th	11	6	7
(China) 2002	11th	9	3	6
(Brazil) 2006	6th	12	6	6
(Czech Republic) 2010	Did not qualify			
(Turkey) 2014	Did not qualify			
(Spain) 2018	Did not qualify			
(Australia) 2022	Did not qualify			
(Germany) 2026	Did not qualify			
(Japan) 2030	To be determined			
Total	6th	24	15	19

== Team ==
=== Current roster ===
Roster for the EuroBasket Women 2025.

Lithuania women's national basketball team roster
Players
Coaches

Pos.	No.	Name	Age – Date of birth	Height	Club	Ctr.
SF	4	Justė Jocytė	19 – 19 November 2005	1.84 m (6 ft 0 in)	Uni Girona	(Spain)
SG	6	Kamilė Nacickaitė	35 – 28 December 1989	1.82 m (6 ft 0 in)	Tango Bourges Basket	(France)
PF	8	Gerda Raulušaitytė	20 – 11 September 2004	1.87 m (6 ft 2 in)	Tarptautinis universitetas	(Lithuania)
SF	11	Brigita Sinickaitė	24 – 1 February 2001	1.74 m (5 ft 9 in)	Neptunas-Amberton	(Lithuania)
SF	12	Laura Juškaitė (C)	27 – 22 September 1997	1.86 m (6 ft 1 in)	BK Brno	(Czech Republic)
C	14	Eglė Šventoraitė	34 – 16 May 1991	1.98 m (6 ft 6 in)	Neptunas-Amberton	(Lithuania)
SF	17	Gabija Meškonytė	27 – 30 April 1998	1.82 m (6 ft 0 in)	Kibirkštis Vilnius	(Lithuania)
PF	18	Monika Grigalauskytė	33 – 17 February 1992	1.91 m (6 ft 3 in)	Diósgyőri VTK	(Hungary)
PF	21	Laura Miškinienė	32 – 28 October 1992	1.90 m (6 ft 3 in)	AZS Poznań	(Poland)
SF	22	Eglė Zabotkaitė	25 – 24 January 2000	1.75 m (5 ft 9 in)	Kibirkštis Vilnius	(Lithuania)
PG	44	Dalia Donskichytė	25 – 14 April 2000	1.65 m (5 ft 5 in)	Šiauliai-Vilmers	(Lithuania)
C	77	Giedrė Labuckienė	34 – 15 July 1990	1.90 m (6 ft 3 in)	Kibirkštis Vilnius	(Lithuania)

Head coach

- (Lithuania) Vilius Stanišauskas

Assistant coach(es)

- (Lithuania) Tomas Rinkevičius

Legend

- (C) Team captain
- Club – describes last
  club before the tournament
- Age – describes age
  on 18 June 2025

== See also ==
- Lithuania women's national under-19 basketball team
- Lithuania women's national under-17 basketball team
- Lithuania men's national basketball team
- Lithuanian Basketball Federation
