= EuroBasket Women 1981 squads =

This article highlights the rosters and teams which participated in the 1981 European Women Basketball Championship, commonly called EuroBasket Women 1981, held by FIBA Europe. The competition took place in Italy from 13 September to 20 September 1981. Soviet Union won the gold medal and Poland the silver medal while Czechoslovakia won the bronze.

== Group A ==
=== Yugoslavia ===
Yugoslavia roster
Players
Coaches

Pos.	No.	Name	Age – Date of birth	Height	Club
	4	Sanja Ožegović	–
	5	Mersada Bećirspahić	–
	6	Jelica Komnenović	–
	7	Cvetana Dekleva	–
	8	Biljana Marković	–
	9	Jasna Pepeunik	–
	10	Sofija Pekić	–
	11	Marija Tonković	–
	12	Zorica Ðurković	–
	13	Jasmina Perazić	–
	14	Biljana Majstorović	–
	15	Slađana Golić	–

Head coach

Milan Vasojević

Legend

- (C) Team captain
- Injured
