= Belgium women's national basketball team =

Women's national basketball team representing Belgium

Belgium
- FIBA ranking: 6 ▼1 (14 September 2026)
- FIBA zone: FIBA Europe
- National federation: Basketball Belgium
- Coach: Mike Thibault
- Nickname: Belgian Cats

Olympic Games
- Appearances: 2

World Cup
- Appearances: 3

EuroBasket
- Appearances: 15
- Medals: (gold) Gold: (2023, 2025); (bronze) Bronze: (2017, 2021)
Home	Away

First international
- Soviet Union 91–31 Belgium (Budapest, Hungary; 14 May 1950)

Biggest win
- Azerbaijan 28–136 Belgium (Baku, Azerbaijan; 12 November 2023)

Biggest defeat
- Belgium 48–127 Soviet Union (Moulins, France; 22 May 1976)
Medal record
Women's basketball
EuroBasket Women
Gold medal – first place	2025 Czechia–Germany–Italy–Greece	Team
Gold medal – first place	2023 Israel–Slovenia	Team
Bronze medal – third place	2021 France–Spain	Team
Bronze medal – third place	2017 Czech Republic	Team

The Belgium women's national basketball team (nicknamed Belgian Cats) represents Belgium in international basketball, and are controlled by Basketball Belgium. Belgium's first appearance in a major international tournament came at EuroBasket 1950. The team has participated in the European Championship 15 times overall. Their best results at the event are winning two titles (2023, 2025) and two third place finishes (2017, and 2021). Belgium has also competed on the global stage, where they have made three appearances at the World Cup (2018, 2022, 2026), and two at the Olympic Games (2020, 2024). Belgium will be the co-host for the FIBA Women's EuroBasket in 2027 along with Finland, Sweden and Lithuania.

== Competitive record ==
=== Olympic Games ===
Olympic Games record
Year	Place	Pld	W	L	PF	PA
(Canada) 1976	Did not qualify					
(Soviet Union) 1980	Did not qualify					
(United States) 1984	Did not qualify					
(South Korea) 1988	Did not qualify					
(Spain) 1992	Did not qualify					
(United States) 1996	Did not qualify					
(Australia) 2000	Did not qualify					
(Greece) 2004	Did not qualify					
(China) 2008	Did not qualify					
(United Kingdom) 2012	Did not qualify					
(Brazil) 2016	Did not qualify					
(Japan) 2020	7th	4	2	2	319	282
(France) 2024	4th	6	2	4	463	460
(United States) 2028	To be determined					
Total	2/13	10	4	6	782	742

=== FIBA Women's World Cup ===
FIBA Women's World Cup record
Year	Place	Pld	W	L	PF	PA
(Chile) 1953	Did not enter					
(Brazil) 1957	Did not enter					
(Soviet Union) 1959	Did not enter					
(Peru) 1964	Did not qualify					
(Czechoslovakia) 1967	Did not enter					
(Brazil) 1971	Did not qualify					
(Colombia) 1975	Did not qualify					
(South Korea) 1979	Did not qualify					
(Brazil) 1983	Did not qualify					
(Soviet Union) 1986	Did not qualify					
(Malaysia) 1990	Did not qualify					
(Australia) 1994	Did not qualify					
(Germany) 1998	Did not qualify					
(China) 2002	Did not qualify					
(Brazil) 2006	Did not qualify					
(Czech Republic) 2010	Did not qualify					
(Turkey) 2014	Did not qualify					
(Spain) 2018	4th	6	3	3	456	401
(Australia) 2022	5th	6	3	3	433	435
(Germany) 2026	5th	4	3	1	319	300
(Japan) 2030	To be determined					
Total	3/20	16	9	7	1208	1136

=== EuroBasket Women ===
EuroBasket Women record
Year	Place	Pld	W	L	PF	PA
(Italy) 1938	Did not enter					
(Hungary) 1950	8th	7	4	3	287	302
(Soviet Union) 1952	Did not enter					
(Socialist Federal Republic of Yugoslavia) 1954	Did not enter					
(Czechoslovakia) 1956	Did not enter					
(Poland) 1958	Did not enter					
(Bulgaria) 1960	10th	7	0	7	284	402
(France) 1962	10th	5	0	5	172	287
(Hungary) 1964	Did not enter					
(Romania) 1966	Did not enter					
(Italy) 1968	7th	9	2	7	374	615
(Netherlands) 1970	12th	7	0	7	390	599
(Bulgaria) 1972	Did not qualify					
(Italy) 1974	Did not qualify					
(France) 1976	12th	8	1	7	471	740
(Poland) 1978	Did not qualify					
(Socialist Federal Republic of Yugoslavia) 1980	13th	8	1	7	453	668
(Italy) 1981	Did not qualify					
(Hungary) 1983	Did not qualify					
(Italy) 1985	12th	7	0	7	306	350
(Spain) 1987	Did not qualify					
(Bulgaria) 1989	Did not qualify					
(Israel) 1991	Did not qualify					
(Italy) 1993	Did not qualify					
(Czech Republic) 1995	Did not qualify					
(Hungary) 1997	Did not qualify					
(Poland) 1999	Did not qualify					
(France) 2001	Did not qualify					
(Greece) 2003	6th	8	3	5	578	649
(Turkey) 2005	Did not qualify					
(Italy) 2007	7th	8	4	4	525	520
(Latvia) 2009	Did not qualify					
(Poland) 2011	Did not qualify					
(France) 2013	Did not qualify					
(Hungary) (Romania) 2015	Did not qualify					
(Czech Republic) 2017	Bronze medal	6	5	1	413	376
(Latvia) (Serbia) 2019	5th	6	3	3	418	400
(France) (Spain) 2021	Bronze medal	6	4	2	445	414
(Israel) (Slovenia) 2023	Gold medal	6	6	0	488	338
(Czech Republic) (Germany) (Italy) (Greece) 2025	Gold medal	6	6	0	456	342
(Belgium) (Finland) (Sweden) (Lithuania) 2027	Qualified as co-host					
Total	15/41	104	39	65	6060	7002

== Current roster ==
Roster for the 2026 FIBA Women's Basketball World Cup.

Belgium women's national basketball team roster
Players
Coaches

Pos.	No.	Name	Age – Date of birth	Height	Club	Ctr.
PG	4	Elise Ramette	27 – 3 November 1998	1.71 m (5 ft 7 in)	ŽKK Budućnost Podgorica	(Montenegro)
PF	5	Nastja Claessens	21 – 2 December 2004	1.86 m (6 ft 1 in)	Kansas State Wildcats	(United States)
SF	6	Antonia Delaere	32 – 1 August 1994	1.82 m (6 ft 0 in)	Minnesota Lynx	(United States)
PF	11	Emma Meesseman (C)	33 – 13 May 1993	1.93 m (6 ft 4 in)	Fenerbahçe	(Turkey)
C	13	Kyara Linskens	29 – 13 November 1996	1.93 m (6 ft 4 in)	Phoenix Mercury	(United States)
SF	22	Bethy Mununga	29 – 22 July 1997	1.83 m (6 ft 0 in)	ASVEL Basket	(France)
C	25	Becky Massey	26 – 21 March 2000	1.86 m (6 ft 1 in)	Basket Landes	(France)
SF	31	Maxuella Lisowa-Mbaka	25 – 14 May 2001	1.78 m (5 ft 10 in)	CS Rapid București	(Romania)
C	34	Billie Massey	26 – 21 March 2000	1.86 m (6 ft 1 in)	CB Jairis	(Spain)
G	35	Julie Vanloo	33 – 10 February 1993	1.73 m (5 ft 8 in)	Athinaikos	(Greece)
PG	55	Julie Allemand	30 – 7 July 1996	1.74 m (5 ft 9 in)	Toronto Tempo	(Canada)
G	71	Alicia Courthiau	20 – 6 December 2005	1.78 m (5 ft 10 in)	Wisconsin Badgers	(United States)

Head coach

- (United States) Mike Thibault

Assistant coach(es)

- (Belgium) Pascal Angillis
- (France) Frederic Dusart

Legend

- (C) Team captain
- Club – describes last
  club before the tournament
- Age – describes age
  on 4 September 2026

== See also ==
- Belgium women's national under-20 basketball team
- Belgium women's national under-19 basketball team
- Belgium women's national under-17 basketball team
- Belgium women's national 3x3 team
