= Ravilja Salimova =

Uzbek basketball player (1941–2019)

Ravilja Salimova, also known as Ravilja Prokopenko (8 September 1941 – 3 July 2019) was an Uzbek basketball player who played in the Soviet Union women's national basketball teams which won the European women's basketball championship in 1962, 1964, 1966, and 1968, the 1964 FIBA World Championship for Women and the 1967 FIBA World Championship for Women.

She was born in Shoʻrchi of the Surxondaryo Region, and died in Tashkent, Uzbekistan.
