= Homar (disambiguation) =

Homar may refer to:

== People ==
=== Surname ===
- Albert Monteys i Homar (born 1971), Spanish comic writer and illustrator
- Lluís Homar (born 1957), Spanish actor and theater director
- Lorena Homar López (born 1991), Spanish Paralympics swimmer
- Lorenzo Homar (1913–2004), Puerto Rican American printmaker, painter, and calligrapher
- Marjana Bremec Homar (born 1946) Yugoslav and Slovenian basketball player

=== Given name ===
- Homar Gomez, American politician
- Homar Rojas (born 1964), Mexican baseball player and coach

== Places ==
- Homar, a village in Bosnia and Herzegovina

== Other ==
- HOMAR-A, a Polish military defence program
