= EuroBasket Women 1970 =

EuroBasket 1970 Women
12th FIBA European Women's Basketball Championship

Tournament details
- Host country: Netherlands
- Teams: 12

Final positions
- Champions: Soviet Union (10th title)

Tournament statistics
- Top scorer: (Socialist Federal Republic of Yugoslavia) Veger-Demšar (27.3)

Official website
- Official website (archive)

The 1970 European Women Basketball Championship, commonly called EuroBasket Women 1970, was the 12th regional championship held by FIBA Europe. The competition was held in the Netherlands. Soviet Union won the gold medal and France the silver medal while Yugoslavia won the bronze.

== First stage ==
=== Group A ===
Pl	Team	Pld	W	L	PF	PA
1	Bulgaria	5	5	0	403	319
2	(Socialist Federal Republic of Yugoslavia) Yugoslavia	5	4	1	442	336
3	(Czech Republic) Czechoslovakia	5	3	2	394	316
4	Romania	5	2	3	374	347
5	Austria	5	1	4	251	369
6	Belgium	5	0	5	286	463

September 11	Yugoslavia (Socialist Federal Republic of Yugoslavia)	115–56	Belgium
September 11	Romania	86–45	Austria
September 11	Bulgaria	77–74	(Czech Republic) Czechoslovakia
September 12	Bulgaria	76–59	Austria
September 12	Czechoslovakia (Czech Republic)	105–57	Belgium
September 12	Yugoslavia (Socialist Federal Republic of Yugoslavia)	88–77	Romania
September 13	Yugoslavia (Socialist Federal Republic of Yugoslavia)	79–38	Austria
September 13	Bulgaria	84–47	Belgium
September 13	Czechoslovakia (Czech Republic)	67–66	Romania
September 15	Romania	93–75	Belgium
September 15	Czechoslovakia (Czech Republic)	77–43	Austria
September 15	Bulgaria	94–87	(Socialist Federal Republic of Yugoslavia) Yugoslavia
September 16	Austria	66–51	Belgium
September 16	Bulgaria	72–52	Romania
September 16	Yugoslavia (Socialist Federal Republic of Yugoslavia)	73–71	(Czech Republic) Czechoslovakia

=== Group B ===
Pl	Team	Pld	W	L	PF	PA
1	Soviet Union	5	5	0	448	203
2	France	5	4	1	295	301
3	Poland	5	3	2	303	313
4	Netherlands	5	2	3	277	333
5	Hungary	5	1	4	268	307
6	Italy	5	0	5	231	365

September 11	France	68–67	Poland
September 11	Soviet Union	89–32	Italy
September 11	Netherlands	60–58	Hungary
September 12	Poland	55–53	Hungary
September 12	Soviet Union	92–44	Netherlands
September 12	France	63–58	Italy
September 13	France	69–50	Netherlands
September 13	Poland	63–48	Italy
September 13	Soviet Union	94–33	Hungary
September 15	Soviet Union	77–41	France
September 15	Poland	65–48	Netherlands
September 15	Hungary	75–44	Italy
September 16	France	54–49	Hungary
September 16	Netherlands	75–49	Italy
September 16	Soviet Union	96–53	Poland

== Play-off stages ==
Semifinals
September 18
(Socialist Federal Republic of Yugoslavia) Yugoslavia	49
Soviet Union	116
September 18
Bulgaria	64
France	69

Final
September 19
Soviet Union	94
France	33
Third place
September 19
Bulgaria	66
(Socialist Federal Republic of Yugoslavia) Yugoslavia	77

9th to 12th places
September 18	Italy	67–54	Austria
September 18	Hungary	76–45	Belgium
5th to 8th places
September 18	Poland	67–53	Romania
September 18	Czechoslovakia (Czech Republic)	62–50	Netherlands
11th place
September 19	Austria	60–59	Belgium
9th place
September 19	Italy	60–59	Hungary
7th place
September 19	Netherlands	69–59	Romania
5th place
September 19	Czechoslovakia (Czech Republic)	63–62	Poland

1970 FIBA European Women's Basketball Championship champion

Soviet Union
Tenth title

== Final ranking ==
Rank	Team	PE
Gold medal	Soviet Union	Same position
Silver medal	France	▲9
Bronze medal	(Socialist Federal Republic of Yugoslavia) Yugoslavia	▼1
4	Bulgaria	▲1
5	(Czech Republic) Czechoslovakia	▲4
6	Poland	▼3
7	Netherlands	▲5
8	Romania	Same position
9	Italy	▼3
10	Hungary	Same position
11	Austria	New entry
12	Belgium	▼5
