= Julie Tétart =

French basketball player (born 1992)

Julie Tétart (born June 10, 1992) is a French professional basketball player. A 6 ft 3 in (1.91 m) post player, she plays for the Monaco Basket Association in Ligue Féminine 2, the second division of French women's basketball, where in the 2025–26 season she led the league in both scoring and rebounding.

== Early life and career ==
Tétart is from Saint-Quentin in the Aisne department of northern France. Before her transition, she played in France's men's leagues, including for ESC Tergnier and for a Saint-Quentin club in the Nationale 3 division.

Tétart is a transgender woman. She came out publicly in October 2021 and stopped playing basketball the same year, despite what she described as the support of her club and teammates at the time, believing her competitive career was over. She spent about three years away from the sport during her transition before returning to competition.

Tétart joined Monaco Basket Association after a tryout, becoming the first openly transgender athlete to play for a Monaco sports club. In the 2025–26 season she averaged 21.2 points and 20.2 rebounds per game, leading Ligue Féminine 2 in both categories, as Monaco reached the playoffs for the first time in club history while pursuing promotion to the top division. She is one of two transgender women playing in the league, alongside Aurore Pautou.

She drew media attention in France and internationally, including debate over the participation of transgender women in women's sport, and she has described facing transphobic abuse from spectators at some matches. In 2026, she said she would be open to playing in the WNBA if offered a contract, describing it as a childhood dream, while expressing reservations about the political climate in the United States; no WNBA team has made her an offer. She has also stated ambitions of playing in the EuroLeague and for the French national team.
