= Salimova =

Salimova is a feminine surname. Its equivalent for males is Salimov. It may refer to:

- Ekaterina Salimova (born 1982), Russian female water polo player
- Nurgyul Salimova (born 2003), Bulgarian chess player
- Ravilja Salimova (1941-2019), Uzbek basketball player
- Shovkat Salimova (1920–1999), Azerbaijani ship captain
