= East Germany women's national basketball team =

Women's national basketball team representing East Germany

East Germany
- FIBA ranking: defunct
- FIBA zone: FIBA Europe
- National federation: Basketball–Verband der DDR (DBV)
- Coach: None

Olympic Games
- Appearances: None

World Cup
- Appearances: 1 (1967)
- Medals: None

EuroBasket Women
- Appearances: 6
- Medals: Bronze: 1966
| Home | Away |

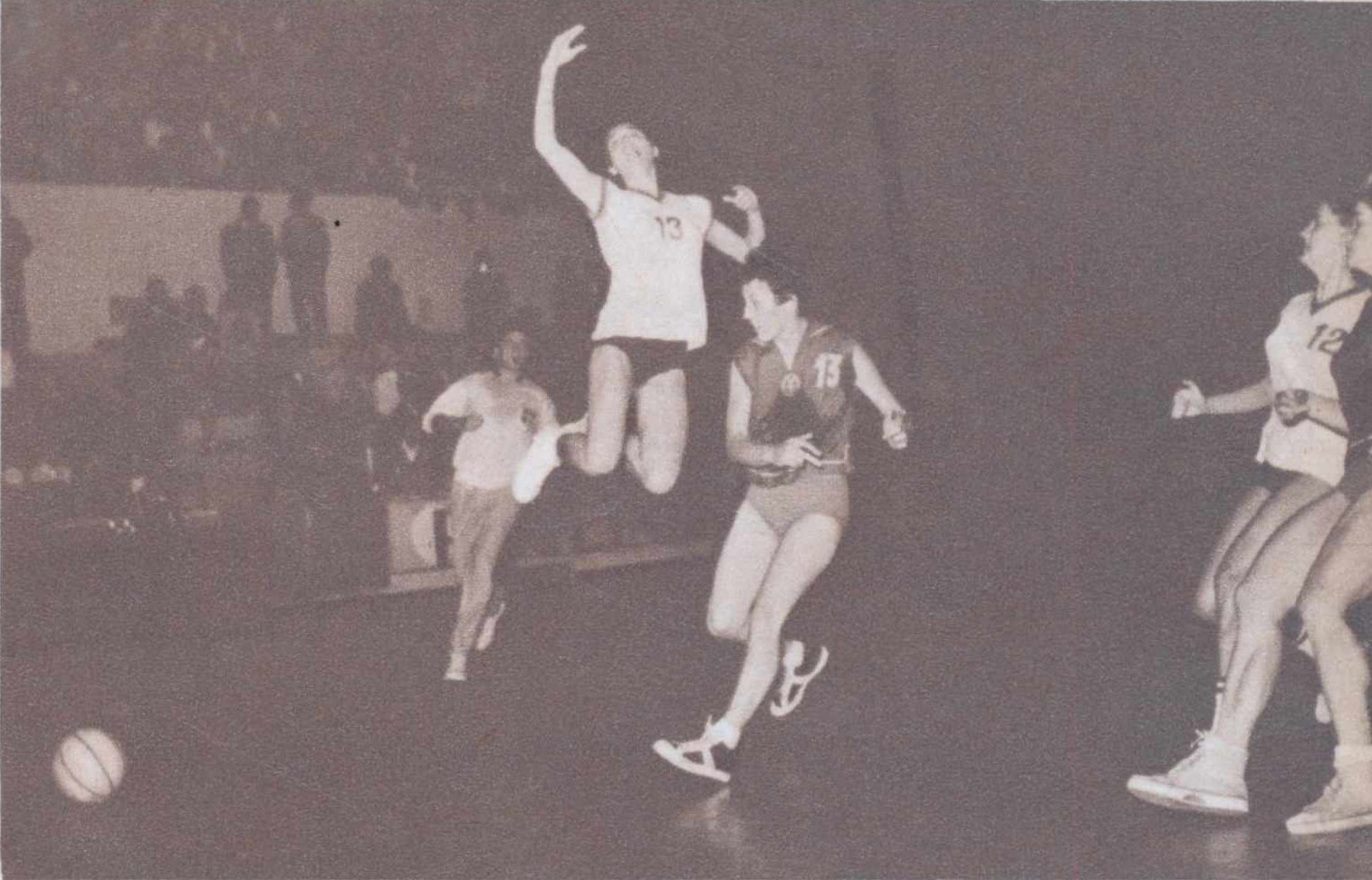
The East German women's national basketball team against Romania in 1966

The East Germany women's national basketball team was the women's basketball side that represented East Germany in international competitions. After German reunification in 1990, the team ceased to exist and was succeeded by the present-day Germany women's national basketball team. The team won a bronze medal at the 1966 European Championship.

== Competition records ==
Olympic Games

- 1976–1988 – Did not qualify

FIBA World Championship for Women

- 1953–1964 – Did not qualify
- 1967 – 4th place
- 1971–1990 – Did not qualify

EuroBasket Women

- 1950 – Did not qualify
- 1952 – 12th place
- 1954–1956 – Did not qualify
- 1958 – 9th place
- 1960–1962 – Did not qualify
- 1964 – 6th place
- 1966 – 3rd place
- 1968 – 4th place
- 1970 – Did not qualify
- 1972 – 7th place
- 1974–1989 – Did not qualify

== See also ==
- Germany women's national basketball team
