= EuroBasket Women 1968 =

EuroBasket 1968 Women
11th FIBA European Women's Basketball Championship

Tournament details
- Host country: Italy
- Teams: 13

Final positions
- Champions: Soviet Union (9th title)

Tournament statistics
- Top scorer: (Socialist Federal Republic of Yugoslavia) Veger-Demšar (18.2)

Official website
- Official website (archive)

The 1968 European Women Basketball Championship, commonly called EuroBasket Women 1968, was the 11th regional championship held by FIBA Europe. The competition was held in Italy. Soviet Union (with 16 years old 7footer Uljana Semjonova) easily won the gold medal and Yugoslavia the silver medal while Poland won the bronze.

== First stage ==
=== Group A ===
Pl	Team	Pld	W	L	PF	PA
1	Soviet Union	3	3	0	279	83
2	Belgium	3	2	1	139	179
3	Netherlands	3	1	2	126	181
4	West Germany	3	0	3	110	211

July 5	Netherlands	48–36	West Germany
July 5	Soviet Union	83–27	Belgium
July 6	Belgium	54–49	Netherlands
July 6	Soviet Union	105–27	West Germany
July 7	Belgium	58–47	West Germany
July 7	Soviet Union	91–29	Netherlands

=== Group B ===
Pl	Team	Pld	W	L	PF	PA
1	(Socialist Federal Republic of Yugoslavia) Yugoslavia	3	3	0	193	149
2	East Germany	3	2	1	172	161
3	Hungary	3	1	2	140	170
4	France	3	0	3	149	174

July 5	East Germany	61–46	France
July 5	Yugoslavia (Socialist Federal Republic of Yugoslavia)	62–43	Hungary
July 6	Yugoslavia (Socialist Federal Republic of Yugoslavia)	65–56	France
July 6	East Germany	61–49	Hungary
July 7	Hungary	48–47	France
July 7	Yugoslavia (Socialist Federal Republic of Yugoslavia)	66–50	East Germany

=== Group C ===
Pl	Team	Pld	W	L	PF	PA
1	Poland	3	2	1	174	158
2	Bulgaria	3	2	1	146	143
3	(Czech Republic) Czechoslovakia	3	2	1	161	140
4	Romania	3	0	3	123	163

July 5	Bulgaria	52–49	Romania
July 5	Poland	72–58	(Czech Republic) Czechoslovakia
July 6	Poland	55–44	Romania
July 6	Czechoslovakia (Czech Republic)	47–38	Bulgaria
July 7	Czechoslovakia (Czech Republic)	56–30	Romania
July 7	Bulgaria	56–47	Poland

== Second stage ==
=== Championship Group ===
Pl	Team	Pld	W	L	PF	PA
1	Soviet Union	6	6	0	498	266
2	(Socialist Federal Republic of Yugoslavia) Yugoslavia	6	4	2	337	318
3	Poland	6	4	2	323	325
4	East Germany	6	3	3	354	337
5	Bulgaria	6	2	4	296	350
6	Italy	6	2	4	270	281
7	Belgium	6	0	6	235	436

July 9	Yugoslavia (Socialist Federal Republic of Yugoslavia)	59–47	Poland
July 9	Italy	61–36	Belgium
July 9	Soviet Union	81–37	Bulgaria
July 10	Poland	61–30	Belgium
July 10	Yugoslavia (Socialist Federal Republic of Yugoslavia)	54–44	Bulgaria
July 10	East Germany	54–43	Italy
July 11	Bulgaria	65–43	Belgium
July 11	Soviet Union	84–51	(Socialist Federal Republic of Yugoslavia) Yugoslavia
July 11	Poland	58–50	East Germany
July 12	Soviet Union	84–34	Belgium
July 12	East Germany	64–41	Bulgaria
July 12	Poland	38–37	Italy
July 13	Yugoslavia (Socialist Federal Republic of Yugoslavia)	82–44	Belgium
July 13	Soviet Union	96–58	East Germany
July 13	Bulgaria	52–44	Italy
July 14	Soviet Union	61–31	Italy
July 14	Yugoslavia (Socialist Federal Republic of Yugoslavia)	51–45	East Germany
July 14	Poland	64–57	Bulgaria
July 15	East Germany	83–48	Belgium
July 15	Soviet Union	92–55	Poland
July 15	Italy	54–40	(Socialist Federal Republic of Yugoslavia) Yugoslavia

1968 FIBA European Women's Basketball Championship champion

Soviet Union
Ninth title

=== 8th to 13th Places Group ===
Pl	Team	Pld	W	L	PF	PA
1	Romania	5	5	0	298	246
2	(Czech Republic) Czechoslovakia	5	4	1	322	234
3	Hungary	5	3	2	248	210
4	France	5	2	3	284	257
5	Netherlands	5	1	4	248	282
6	West Germany	5	0	5	193	364

July 9	Czechoslovakia (Czech Republic)	54–49	France
July 9	Hungary	48–42	Netherlands
July 9	Romania	55–43	West Germany
July 10	Czechoslovakia (Czech Republic)	79–32	West Germany
July 10	Hungary	42–36	France
July 10	Romania	52–46	Netherlands
July 11	Netherlands	64–41	West Germany
July 11	Romania	59–48	France
July 11	Czechoslovakia (Czech Republic)	43–39	Hungary
July 13	Czechoslovakia (Czech Republic)	81–41	Netherlands
July 13	Romania	59–44	Hungary
July 13	France	91–47	West Germany
July 14	Hungary	75–30	West Germany
July 14	France	60–55	Netherlands
July 14	Romania	73–65	(Czech Republic) Czechoslovakia

== Final ranking ==
Rank	Team	PE
Gold medal	Soviet Union	Same position
Silver medal	(Socialist Federal Republic of Yugoslavia) Yugoslavia	▲4
Bronze medal	Poland	▲5
4	East Germany	▼1
5	Bulgaria	▲2
6	Italy	▲4
7	Belgium	New entry
8	Romania	▼4
9	(Czech Republic) Czechoslovakia	▼7
10	Hungary	▼1
11	France	Same position
12	Netherlands	▼7
13	West Germany	▼1
