= Salimov =

Salimov is a surname. Notable people with the surname include:

- Arif Salimov (born 1956), Azerbaijani mathematician
- Damir Salimov (1937–2019), Uzbek film director
- Habib Bey Salimov (1881–1920), Azerbaijani military commander
- Rasul Salimov (born 1981), Dagestani judoka
- Roman Salimov (born 1995), Russian football player
- Salim Salimov (boxer) (1982–2025), Turkish-Bulgarian boxer
- Salim Salimov (politician) (1941–2024), Azerbaijani schoolteacher and politician
- Yaqub Salimov, Tajikistani politician

== See also ==
- Salimova, the feminine form
