= Netherlands women's national basketball team =

Netherlands
- FIBA ranking: 55 ▼1 (14 September 2026)
- FIBA zone: FIBA Europe
- National federation: Basketball Nederland
- Coach: Julie Barennes

Olympic Games
- Appearances: None

World Cup
- Appearances: 1
- Medals: None

EuroBasket
- Appearances: 16
- Medals: None
Home	Away

The Netherlands women's national basketball team represents the Netherlands in international women's basketball. The team is controlled by Basketball Nederland.

== Competitive record ==
=== FIBA Women's World Cup ===
Women's World Cup							Qualification
Year	Position	Pld	W	L	PF	PA	Qualification
1950 - 1975	did not qualify						—N/a
(South Korea) 1979	8th	6	4	2	499	355	10th place in EuroBasket Women 1978 (invited)
1983 - 2022	did not qualify						—N/a
(Germany) 2026	did not qualify						Qualifiers to EuroBasket Women 2025
(Japan) 2030	To be determined						
Total	1/19	6	4	2	499	355	

=== EuroBasket Women ===
EuroBasket							Qualification				
Year	Position	Pld	W	L	PF	PA	Pld	W	L	PF	PA
(Italy) 1938	did not enter						—N/a				
(Hungary) 1950	12th	7	1	6	156	281	—N/a				
(Soviet Union) 1952	did qualify						5	2	3	166	195
(Socialist Federal Republic of Yugoslavia) 1954	did not enter						—N/a				
(Czechoslovakia) 1956	12th	6	3	3	425	412	—N/a				
(Poland) 1958	8th	6	2	4	205	324	—N/a				
(Bulgaria) 1960	8th	6	2	4	262	358	—N/a				
(France) 1962	did not enter						7	3	4	329	349
(Hungary) 1964	did not enter						2	0	2	104	136
(Romania) 1966	5th	7	4	3	405	463	3	3	0	216	97
(Italy) 1968	12th	8	2	6	374	463	Automatic qualification				
(Netherlands) 1970	7th	7	3	4	396	454	Host				
(Bulgaria) 1972	11th	8	2	6	402	482	—N/a				
(Italy) 1974	11th	7	2	5	371	416	3	3	0	271	112
(France) 1976	11th	8	2	6	490	541	3	3	0	219	129
(Poland) 1978	10th	7	3	4	436	457	2	1	1	136	151
(Socialist Federal Republic of Yugoslavia) 1980	6th	8	5	3	469	546	—N/a				
(Italy) 1981	6th	7	4	3	401	438	—N/a				
(Hungary) 1983	8th	7	2	5	403	442	4	3	1	330	209
(Italy) 1985	11th	7	2	8	398	428	3	2	1	178	150
(Spain) 1987	did not qualify						3	2	1	197	179
(Soviet Union) 1989	6th	5	1	5	265	290	8	7	1	560	311
(Israel) 1991	did not qualify						5	3	2	317	316
(Italy) 1993	did not qualify						5	2	3	277	301
(Czech Republic) 1995	did not qualify						5	2	3	292	307
(Hungary) 1997	did not qualify						7	4	3	492	414
(Poland) 1999	did not qualify						5	3	2	371	343
(France) 2001	did not qualify						5	3	2	303	304
(Greece) 2003	did not qualify						did not enter				
(Turkey) 2005	did not qualify										
(Italy) 2007	did not qualify										
(Latvia) 2009	did not qualify										
(Poland) 2011	did not qualify						12	4	8	768	911
(France) 2013	did not qualify						8	2	6	448	550
(Hungary) (Romania) 2015	did not qualify						7	1	6	390	473
(Czech Republic) 2017	did not qualify						6	3	3	367	402
(Latvia) (Serbia) 2019	did not qualify						6	2	4	353	459
(France) (Spain) 2021	did not qualify						4	2	2	248	264
(Israel) (Slovenia) 2023	did not qualify						4	2	2	256	256
(Czech Republic) (Germany) (Italy) (Greece) 2025	did not qualify						6	2	4	382	422
(Belgium) (Finland) (Sweden) (Lithuania) 2027	To be determined						To be determined				
Total	16/41	111	40	75	5858	6795	155	64	64	7970	7126

== Results and fixtures ==
Win Loss

=== 2021 ===
11 November 2021 2023 EuroBasket qualifiers	Netherlands	82–60	Ireland	Amsterdam
18:30	Scoring by quarter: 31–10, 15–15, 15–20, 21–15
	Pts: Treffers 18; Rebs: Hof 12; Asts: Westerik 4	Boxscore	Pts: Melia 16; Rebs: Finn 7 Asts: Thornton 5	Arena: Sporthallen Zuid; Referees: Amel Dahra (FRA), Danjana Rey (GER), Ivana Radinović (MNE)

14 November 2021 2023 EuroBasket qualifiers	Belarus	Annulled	Netherlands

=== 2022 ===
24 November 2022 2023 EuroBasket qualifiers	Netherlands	66–71	Czech Republic	Almere
19:00	Scoring by quarter: 15–24, 13–19, 23–16, 15–12
	Pts: Fokke, Westerik 11; Rebs: Bettonvil 7 Asts: Bettonvil 4	Boxscore	Pts: Reisingerová 19; Rebs: Reisingerová 7 Asts: Voráčková 8	Arena: Topsportcentrum; Referees: Jelena Tomić (CRO), Mehmet Karabilecen (TUR), Franko Gracin (CRO)

27 November 2022 2023 EuroBasket qualifiers	Ireland	56–58	Netherlands	Dublin
17:15	Scoring by quarter: 21–9, 13–5, 12–28, 10–17
		Boxscore		Arena: National Basketball Arena; Referees: Marion Ortis (FRA), Kate Unsworth (GBR), Laure Coanus (FRA)

=== 2023 ===
9 February 2023 2023 EuroBasket qualifiers	Netherlands	Cancelled	Belarus

12 February 2023 2023 EuroBasket qualifiers	Czech Republic	69–49	Netherlands	Prague
18:00	Scoring by quarter: 10–12, 21–7, 23–11, 15–19
	Pts: Březinová 19; Rebs: Eliška Hamzová, Voráčková 6 Asts: Voráčková 4	Boxscore	Pts: Vennema 9 Rebs: Van den Adel 7 Asts: Van den Adel 4	Arena: Královka Arena; Referees: Alexandra Stan (ROU), Ewa Matuszewska (POL), Armin Mutapčić (GER)

== Team ==
=== Current roster ===
Roster for the EuroBasket Women 2021 qualification games.

Netherlands women's national basketball team roster
Players
Coaches

Pos.	No.	Name	Age – Date of birth	Height	Club	Ctr.
SF	3	Loyce Bettonvil	28 – 5 November 1993	1.85 m (6 ft 1 in)	Orange Lions Academy	(Netherlands)
PG	5	Laura Cornelius	25 – 8 February 1996	1.74 m (5 ft 9 in)	Gernika KESB	(Spain)
PG	7	Karin Kuijt	31 – 12 October 1990	1.70 m (5 ft 7 in)	Acciaierie Valbruna Bolzano	(Italy)
SF	9	Esther Fokke	25 – 9 August 1996	1.86 m (6 ft 1 in)	Orange Lions Academy	(Netherlands)
SF	10	Natalie van den Adel	31 – 25 October 1990	1.85 m (6 ft 1 in)	Porta XI Ensino	(Spain)
PF	11	Jill Bettonvil	29 – 18 May 1992	1.87 m (6 ft 2 in)	Orange Lions Academy	(Netherlands)
C	14	Emese Hof	25 – 29 May 1996	1.90 m (6 ft 3 in)	Avenida	(Spain)
SG	17	Ilse Kuijt	22 – 20 July 1999	1.80 m (5 ft 11 in)	Orange Lions Academy	(Netherlands)
PF	21	Kourtney Treffers	27 – 8 August 1994	1.86 m (6 ft 1 in)	Den Helder Suns	(Netherlands)
SF	24	Laura Westerik	22 – 31 December 1998	1.76 m (5 ft 9 in)	Herner TC	(Germany)
PG	30	Noor Driessen	22 – 22 August 1999	1.82 m (6 ft 0 in)	Orange Lions Academy	(Netherlands)
PF	33	Janis Boonstra	24 – 28 May 1997	1.83 m (6 ft 0 in)	Basket 25 Bydgoszcz	(Poland)

Head coach

- (Netherlands) Hakim Salem

Legend

- (C) Team captain
- Club – describes last
  club before the competition
- Age – describes age
  on 26 November 2021

== See also ==
- Netherlands women's national under-20 basketball team
- Netherlands women's national under-19 basketball team
- Netherlands women's national under-17 basketball team
- Netherlands men's national basketball team
