= EuroBasket Women 1972 =

Basketball competition

EuroBasket 1972 Women
13th FIBA European Women's Basketball Championship

Tournament details
- Host country: Bulgaria
- Dates: 6–16 October
- Teams: 12

Final positions
- Champions: Soviet Union (11th title)

Official website
- Official website (archive)

The 1972 European Women Basketball Championship, commonly called EuroBasket Women 1972, was the 13th regional championship held by FIBA Europe. The competition was held in Bulgaria. Soviet Union won the gold medal and Bulgaria the silver medal while Czechoslovakia won the bronze.

== First stage ==
=== Group A ===
Pl	Team	Pld	W	L	PF	PA
1	Soviet Union	5	5	0	430	218
2	Hungary	5	3	2	272	252
3	Romania	5	3	2	244	286
4	(Socialist Federal Republic of Yugoslavia) Yugoslavia	5	3	2	301	331
5	Poland	5	1	4	248	299
6	Italy	5	0	5	196	308

October 8	Romania	56–53	Hungary
October 8	Yugoslavia (Socialist Federal Republic of Yugoslavia)	59–55	Italy
October 8	Soviet Union	82–46	Poland
October 9	Soviet Union	88–43	Romania
October 9	Hungary	67–30	Italy
October 9	Yugoslavia (Socialist Federal Republic of Yugoslavia)	82–66	Poland
October 10	Hungary	64–46	(Socialist Federal Republic of Yugoslavia) Yugoslavia
October 10	Romania	47–46	Poland
October 10	Soviet Union	93–37	Italy
October 11	Hungary	52–47	Poland
October 11	Romania	46–38	Italy
October 11	Soviet Union	94–53	(Socialist Federal Republic of Yugoslavia) Yugoslavia
October 12	Poland	43–36	Italy
October 12	Yugoslavia (Socialist Federal Republic of Yugoslavia)	61–52	Romania
October 12	Soviet Union	73–39	Hungary

=== Group B ===
Pl	Team	Pld	W	L	PF	PA
1	Bulgaria	5	5	0	299	231
2	(Czech Republic) Czechoslovakia	5	4	1	327	258
3	France	5	3	2	276	239
4	East Germany	5	2	3	274	284
5	Netherlands	5	1	4	234	297
6	Austria	5	0	5	240	341

October 8	France	64–37	Netherlands
October 8	Bulgaria	70–39	Austria
October 8	Czechoslovakia (Czech Republic)	68–60	East Germany
October 9	East Germany	58–42	Austria
October 9	Bulgaria	53–44	France
October 9	Czechoslovakia (Czech Republic)	71–44	Netherlands
October 10	Netherlands	62–55	Austria
October 10	Bulgaria	63–55	East Germany
October 10	Czechoslovakia (Czech Republic)	54–38	France
October 11	Czechoslovakia (Czech Republic)	79–56	Austria
October 11	Bulgaria	53–38	Netherlands
October 11	France	58–47	East Germany
October 12	East Germany	54–53	Netherlands
October 12	France	72–48	Austria
October 12	Bulgaria	60–55	(Czech Republic) Czechoslovakia

== Second stage ==
=== Championship Group ===
Pl	Team	Pld	W	L	PF	PA
1	Soviet Union	5	5	0	392	213
2	Bulgaria	5	3	2	272	280
3	(Czech Republic) Czechoslovakia	5	3	2	259	289
4	France	5	2	3	231	361
5	Romania	5	1	4	239	317
6	Hungary	5	0	5	247	280

October 14	Soviet Union	63–41	France
October 14	Bulgaria	61–41	Romania
October 14	Czechoslovakia (Czech Republic)	54–52	Hungary
October 15	France	61–49	Romania
October 15	Soviet Union	89–42	(Czech Republic) Czechoslovakia
October 15	Hungary	61–50	Bulgaria
October 16	France	47–42	Hungary
October 16	Czechoslovakia (Czech Republic)	54–50	Romania
October 16	Soviet Union	79–48	Bulgaria

1972 FIBA European Women's Basketball Championship champion

Soviet Union
Eleventh title

=== 7th to 12th Group ===
Pl	Team	Pld	W	L	PF	PA
1	East Germany	5	5	0	304	243
2	(Socialist Federal Republic of Yugoslavia) Yugoslavia	5	3	2	341	318
3	Poland	5	3	2	286	272
4	Italy	5	2	3	248	255
5	Netherlands	5	2	3	283	294
6	Austria	5	0	5	241	321

October 14	Yugoslavia (Socialist Federal Republic of Yugoslavia)	76–64	Austria
October 14	East Germany	65–40	Italy
October 14	Poland	67–59	Netherlands
October 15	Italy	63–44	Austria
October 15	East Germany	59–48	Poland
October 15	Netherlands	65–64	(Socialist Federal Republic of Yugoslavia) Yugoslavia
October 16	Italy	54–44	Netherlands
October 16	East Germany	68–60	(Socialist Federal Republic of Yugoslavia) Yugoslavia
October 15	Poland	62–36	Austria

== Final ranking ==
Rank	Team	PE
Gold medal	Soviet Union	Same position
Silver medal	Bulgaria	▲2
Bronze medal	(Czech Republic) Czechoslovakia	▲2
4	France	▼1
5	Romania	▲3
6	Hungary	▲4
7	East Germany	New entry
8	(Socialist Federal Republic of Yugoslavia) Yugoslavia	▼6
9	Poland	▼3
10	Italy	▼1
11	Netherlands	▼4
12	Austria	▼1
