= EuroBasket Women 1981 =

EuroBasket 1981 Women
18th FIBA European Women's Basketball Championship

Tournament details
- Host country: Italy
- Dates: 13–20 September
- Teams: 12

Final positions
- Champions: Soviet Union (16th title)

Official website
- Official website (archive)

The 1981 European Women Basketball Championship, commonly called EuroBasket Women 1981, was the 18th regional championship held by FIBA Europe. The competition was held in Italy and took place from 13 September to 20 September 1981. Soviet Union won the gold medal and Poland the silver medal while Czechoslovakia won the bronze.

== First stage ==
=== Group A ===
Pl	Team	Pld	W	L	PF	PA
1	Poland	5	4	1	361	282
2	(Socialist Federal Republic of Yugoslavia) Yugoslavia	5	3	2	329	303
3	Netherlands	5	3	2	280	307
4	Italy	5	2	3	313	305
5	West Germany	5	2	3	282	317
6	Finland	5	1	4	302	353

September 13	Italy	73–47	Finland
September 13	West Germany	71–67	Poland
September 13	Yugoslavia (Socialist Federal Republic of Yugoslavia)	63–43	Netherlands
September 14	Netherlands	60–59	Italy
September 14	Finland	55–50	West Germany
September 14	Poland	59–56	(Socialist Federal Republic of Yugoslavia) Yugoslavia
September 15	Netherlands	76–46	West Germany
September 15	Poland	82–65	Finland
September 15	Yugoslavia (Socialist Federal Republic of Yugoslavia)	68–67	Italy
September 16	Yugoslavia (Socialist Federal Republic of Yugoslavia)	82–72	Finland
September 16	Italy	59–53	West Germany
September 16	Poland	76–35	Netherlands
September 17	West Germany	62–60	(Socialist Federal Republic of Yugoslavia) Yugoslavia
September 17	Netherlands	66–63	Finland
September 17	Poland	77–55	Italy

=== Group B ===
Pl	Team	Pld	W	L	PF	PA
1	Soviet Union	5	5	0	489	304
2	(Czech Republic) Czechoslovakia	5	3	2	355	337
3	Bulgaria	5	3	2	354	368
4	Romania	5	2	3	281	348
5	Hungary	5	2	3	335	352
6	Sweden	5	0	5	284	389

September 13	Czechoslovakia (Czech Republic)	83–49	Sweden
September 13	Romania	64–73	Bulgaria
September 13	Soviet Union	94–68	Hungary
September 14	Bulgaria	66–50	Sweden
September 14	Soviet Union	90–40	Romania
September 14	Hungary	67–66	(Czech Republic) Czechoslovakia
September 15	Bulgaria	71–63	Hungary
September 15	Romania	63–62	Sweden
September 15	Soviet Union	99–58	(Czech Republic) Czechoslovakia
September 16	Romania	58–55	Hungary
September 16	Soviet Union	95–60	Sweden
September 16	Czechoslovakia (Czech Republic)	80–66	Bulgaria
September 17	Hungary	82–63	Sweden
September 17	Soviet Union	111–78	Bulgaria
September 17	Czechoslovakia (Czech Republic)	68–56	Romania

== Play-off stages ==
Semifinals
September 19
Poland	72
(Czech Republic) Czechoslovakia	60
September 19
Soviet Union	94
(Socialist Federal Republic of Yugoslavia) Yugoslavia	60

Final
September 20
Poland	42
Soviet Union	85
Third place
September 20
(Czech Republic) Czechoslovakia	76
(Socialist Federal Republic of Yugoslavia) Yugoslavia	74

9th to 12th places
September 19	West Germany	69–67	Sweden
September 19	Hungary	92–46	Finland
5th to 8th places
September 19	Netherlands	56–51	Romania
September 19	Bulgaria	82–66	Italy
11th place
September 20	Sweden	70–68	Finland
9th place
September 20	Hungary	76–46	West Germany
7th place
September 20	Italy	72–66	Romania
5th place
September 20	Bulgaria	80–65	Netherlands

1981 FIBA European Women's Basketball Championship champion

Soviet Union
Sixteenth title

== Final standings ==
Place	Team	PE
Gold medal	Soviet Union	Same position
Silver medal	Poland	Same position
Bronze medal	(Czech Republic) Czechoslovakia	▲1
4	(Socialist Federal Republic of Yugoslavia) Yugoslavia	▼1
5	Bulgaria	Same position
6	Netherlands	Same position
7	Italy	▲2
8	Romania	Same position
9	Hungary	▼2
10	West Germany	New entry
11	Sweden	New entry
12	Finland	Same position
