= Yugoslavia women's national basketball team =

Women's national basketball team representing Yugoslavia

Yugoslavia
- FIBA ranking: N/A
- FIBA zone: FIBA Europe
- National federation: Basketball Federation of Yugoslavia
- Coach: Miodrag Vesković (last)

Olympic Games
- Appearances: 3
- Medals: Silver: (1988); Bronze: (1980)

World Cup
- Appearances: 5
- Medals: Silver: (1990)

EuroBasket Women
- Appearances: 20
- Medals: Silver: (1968, 1978, 1987, 1991); Bronze: (1970, 1980)
Home	Away

The Yugoslavia women's national basketball team (Serbo-Croatian: Ženska košarkaška reprezentacija Jugoslavije / Женска кошаркашка репрезентација Југославије) was the women's basketball side that represented the Kingdom of Yugoslavia and Socialist Federal Republic of Yugoslavia from 1943 until 1992 in international competition, and were controlled by the Basketball Federation of Yugoslavia (KSJ).

The team's first major tournament appearance was at the 1954 European Championship, hosted by Yugoslavia, in which it finished fourth. The team's biggest success in the following decades were a bronze medal at the 1980 Summer Olympics in Moscow, and a silver medal at the 1988 Seoul Olympics.

The team disappeared during the breakup of Yugoslavia in the early 1990s, and its last major tournament appearance was at the 1991 European Championship in Israel, where they finished as runners-up losing to the Soviet Union in the final.

== Competitive record ==
Olympic Games

Olympic Games
Year	Round	Position	Pld	W	L
(Canada) 1976	did not qualify				
(Soviet Union) 1980	Final round	3rd place, bronze medalist(s)	6	4	2
(United States) 1984	Final round	6th	5	1	4
(South Korea) 1988	Runners-up	2nd place, silver medalist(s)	5	3	2
Total		0 Titles	16	8	8

FIBA World Championship for Women

FIBA World Championship
Year	Round	Position	Pld	W	L
(Chile) 1953	did not participate				
(Brazil) 1957	did not participate				
(Soviet Union) 1959	Final round	4th	7	3	4
(Peru) 1964	Final round	6th	9	3	6
(Czechoslovakia) 1967	Final round	6th	7	2	5
(Brazil) 1971	did not qualify				
(Colombia) 1975	did not qualify				
(South Korea) 1979	did not qualify				
(Brazil) 1983	Second round	8th	9	3	6
(Soviet Union) 1986	did not qualify				
(Malaysia) 1990	Runners-up	Silver medal	8	7	1
Total		0 Titles	40	18	22

EuroBasket Women

EuroBasket Women
Year	Round	Position	Pld	W	L
(Italy) 1938	did not participate				
(Hungary) 1950	did not participate				
(Soviet Union) 1952	did not participate				
(Socialist Federal Republic of Yugoslavia) 1954	Final round	5th	5	1	4
(Czechoslovakia) 1956	Preliminary round	9th	8	6	2
(Poland) 1958	Final round	4th	8	4	4
(Bulgaria) 1960	Final round	5th	7	3	4
(France) 1962	Preliminary round	5th	5	3	2
(Hungary) 1964	Preliminary round	7th	6	3	3
(Romania) 1966	Preliminary round	6th	7	3	4
(Italy) 1968	Runners-up	Silver medal	9	7	2
(Netherlands) 1970	Semi-finals	Bronze medal	7	5	2
(Bulgaria) 1972	Preliminary round	8th	8	4	4
(Italy) 1974	Preliminary round	8th	7	5	2
(France) 1976	Final round	5th	8	4	4
(Poland) 1978	Runners-up	Silver medal	8	6	2
(Socialist Federal Republic of Yugoslavia) 1980	Semi-finals	Bronze medal	5	3	2
(Italy) 1981	Semi-finals	4th	7	3	4
(Hungary) 1983	Semi-finals	4th	7	5	2
(Italy) 1985	Preliminary round	5th	7	5	2
(Spain) 1987	Runners-up	Silver medal	7	6	1
(Bulgaria) 1989	Semi-finals	4th	5	3	2
(Israel) 1991	Runners-up	Silver medal	5	4	1
Total		0 Titles	136	83	53

== Last Yugoslavia Women's Basketball Roster ==
Yugoslavia EuroBasket Women 1991 roster
Players
Coaches

Pos.	No.	Nat.	Name	Ht.	Wt.	Age
SG	4	(Socialist Federal Republic of Yugoslavia) (Serbia)	Ilić, Danijela	1.70 m (5 ft 7 in)	000 kg (0 lb)	21 – 20 August 1970
SG	5	(Socialist Federal Republic of Yugoslavia) (Bosnia and Herzegovina)	Lakić, Mara	1.70 m (5 ft 7 in)	65 kg (143 lb)	28 – 18 August 1963
SG	6	(Socialist Federal Republic of Yugoslavia) (Serbia)	Vild, Eleonora	1.80 m (5 ft 11 in)	70 kg (154 lb)	23 – 9 June 1969
G	7	(Socialist Federal Republic of Yugoslavia) (Bosnia and Herzegovina)	Bajkuša, Vesna	1.76 m (5 ft 9 in)	67 kg (148 lb)	22 – 21 May 1970
C	8	(Socialist Federal Republic of Yugoslavia) (Serbia)	Bjedov, Nina	1.98 m (6 ft 6 in)	000 kg (0 lb)	20 – 18 May 1972
SG	9	(Socialist Federal Republic of Yugoslavia) (Croatia)	Bilić, Danira	1.84 m (6 ft 0 in)	72 kg (159 lb)	22 – 22 July 1969
C	10	(Socialist Federal Republic of Yugoslavia) (Bosnia and Herzegovina)	Golić, Slađana	1.89 m (6 ft 2 in)	75 kg (165 lb)	32 – 12 February 1960
C	11	(Socialist Federal Republic of Yugoslavia) (Croatia)	Lelas, Žana	1.88 m (6 ft 2 in)	70 kg (154 lb)	22 – 28 May 1970
C	12	(Socialist Federal Republic of Yugoslavia) (Bosnia and Herzegovina)	Mujanović, Razija	2.02 m (6 ft 8 in)	75 kg (165 lb)	25 – 15 April 1967
F	13	(Socialist Federal Republic of Yugoslavia) (Bosnia and Herzegovina)	Mirvić, Silvana	1.80 m (5 ft 11 in)	70 kg (154 lb)	21 – 4 March 1971
SG	14	(Socialist Federal Republic of Yugoslavia) (Serbia)	Arbutina, Anđelija	1.78 m (5 ft 10 in)	68 kg (150 lb)	25 – 29 March 1967
C	15	(Socialist Federal Republic of Yugoslavia) (Serbia)	Milošević, Bojana	1.88 m (6 ft 2 in)	77 kg (170 lb)	26 – 29 November 1965

Head coach

- (Socialist Federal Republic of Yugoslavia) (Serbia) Miodrag Vesković

Legend

- (C) Team captain
- Date – 1 July 1991
- Injured

- Roster
Updated: 3 January 2025

== Head coaches ==
Years	Name	Competition
1954	(Socialist Federal Republic of Yugoslavia) Strahinja Alagić	5th 1954 EuroBasket
1956	(Socialist Federal Republic of Yugoslavia) Aleksandar Gec	9th 1956 EuroBasket
1958	(Socialist Federal Republic of Yugoslavia) Milorad Sokolović	4th 1958 EuroBasket
1959		4th 1959 World Championship
1960	(Socialist Federal Republic of Yugoslavia) Borivoje Cenić	5th 1960 EuroBasket
1962–1964	(Socialist Federal Republic of Yugoslavia) Miodrag Stefanović	5th 1962 EuroBasket; 7th 1964 EuroBasket
1964	(Socialist Federal Republic of Yugoslavia) Dragoljub Pljakić	6th 1964 World Championship
1966–1967	(Socialist Federal Republic of Yugoslavia) Ladislav Demšar	6th 1966 EuroBasket; 6th 1967 World Championship
1968	(Socialist Federal Republic of Yugoslavia) Strahinja Alagić	1968 EuroBasket
1970	(Socialist Federal Republic of Yugoslavia) Ladislav Demšar	1970 EuroBasket
1972–1976	(Socialist Federal Republic of Yugoslavia) Borivoje Cenić	8th 1972 EuroBasket; 8th 1974 EuroBasket; 5th 1976 EuroBasket
1976–1979	(Socialist Federal Republic of Yugoslavia) Borislav Ćorković	1978 EuroBasket
1980–1989	(Socialist Federal Republic of Yugoslavia) Milan Vasojević	1980 EuroBasket; (bronze) 1980 Summer Olympics; 4th 1981 EuroBasket; 4th 1983 EuroBasket; 8th 1983 World Championship; 6th 1984 Summer Olympics; 5th 1985 EuroBasket; 1987 EuroBasket; (silver) 1988 Summer Olympics; 4th 1989 EuroBasket
1990	(Socialist Federal Republic of Yugoslavia) Mihajlo Vuković	1990 World Championship
1991	(Socialist Federal Republic of Yugoslavia) Miodrag Vesković	1991 EuroBasket

== New national teams ==
After the dissolution of SFR Yugoslavia in 1991, five new countries were created: Bosnia and Herzegovina, Croatia, FYR Macedonia, FR Yugoslavia (in 2003, renamed to Serbia and Montenegro) and Slovenia. In 2006, Montenegro became an independent nation and Serbia became the legal successor of Serbia and Montenegro. In 2008, Kosovo unilaterally declared independence from Serbia and became a FIBA member in 2015.

Here is a list of women's national teams on the SFR Yugoslavia area:

- Bosnia and Herzegovina (1992–present)
- Croatia (1992–present)
- North Macedonia (1993–present)
- Serbia and Montenegro (1992–2006)
  - Montenegro (2006–present)
  - Serbia (2006–present)
    - Kosovo (2015–present)
- Slovenia (1992–present)
