= Poland women's national basketball team =

Poland
- FIBA ranking: 45 ▼2 (14 September 2026)
- Joined FIBA: 1934
- FIBA zone: FIBA Europe
- National federation: Polski Związek Koszykówki (PZKosz.)
- Coach: Karol Kowalewski

Olympic Games
- Appearances: 1 (2000)
- Medals: None

World Cup
- Appearances: 3
- Medals: None

EuroBasket Women
- Appearances: 29
- Medals: (1): 1999 (2): 1980, 1981 (2): 1938, 1968
Home	Away

The Poland women's national basketball team represents Poland in international women's basketball competitions. It is administered by the Polski Związek Koszykówki (PZKosz.).

== Competition record ==
=== Olympic Games ===
Olympic Games					Pre-Olympic		
Year	Position	Pld	W	L	Pld	W	L
(Canada) 1976	Did not qualify				5	3	2
(Soviet Union) 1980	Did not qualify				7	2	5
(United States) 1984	Did not qualify						
(South Korea) 1988	Did not qualify				5	4	1
(Spain) 1992	Did not qualify				7	2	5
(United States) 1996	Did not qualify						
(Australia) 2000	8th	7	3	4			
(Greece) 2004	Did not qualify						
(China) 2008	Did not qualify						
(United Kingdom) 2012	Did not qualify						
(Brazil) 2016	Did not qualify						
(Japan) 2020	Did not qualify						
(France) 2024	Did not qualify						
(United States) 2028	To be determined						
Total		7	3	4	24	11	13

=== FIBA Women's Basketball World Cup ===
FIBA World Cup
Year	Position	Pld	W	L
(Chile) 1953	Did not qualify			
(Brazil) 1957	Did not qualify			
(Soviet Union) 1959	5th	7	3	4
(Peru) 1964	Did not qualify			
(Czechoslovakia) 1967	Did not qualify			
(Brazil) 1971	Did not qualify			
(Colombia) 1975	Did not qualify			
(South Korea) 1979	Did not qualify			
(Brazil) 1983	7th	9	4	5
(Soviet Union) 1986	Did not qualify			
(Malaysia) 1990	Did not qualify			
(Australia) 1994	13th	8	5	3
(Germany) 1998	Did not qualify			
(China) 2002	Did not qualify			
(Brazil) 2006	Did not qualify			
(Czech Republic) 2010	Did not qualify			
(Turkey) 2014	Did not qualify			
(Spain) 2018	Did not qualify			
(Australia) 2022	Did not qualify			
(Germany) 2026	Did not qualify			
(Japan) 2030	To be determined			
Total		24	12	12

=== EuroBasket Women ===
EuroBasket Women					Qualification		
Year	Position	Pld	W	L	Pld	W	L
(Italy) 1938	Bronze medal						
(Hungary) 1950	6th						
(Soviet Union) 1952	5th						
(Socialist Federal Republic of Yugoslavia) 1954	Did not qualify						
(Czechoslovakia) 1956	5th						
(Poland) 1958	5th						
(Bulgaria) 1960	4th						
(France) 1962	6th						
(Hungary) 1964	5th						
(Romania) 1966	8th						
(Italy) 1968	Bronze medal						
(Netherlands) 1970	6th						
(Bulgaria) 1972	9th						
(Italy) 1974	9th						
(France) 1976	6th						
(Poland) 1978	5th						
(Socialist Federal Republic of Yugoslavia) 1980	Silver medal						
(Italy) 1981	Silver medal						
(Hungary) 1983	7th						
(Italy) 1985	6th						
(Spain) 1987	10th						
(Bulgaria) 1989	Did not qualify						
(Israel) 1991	6th						
(Italy) 1993	5th						
(Czech Republic) 1995	Did not qualify						
(Hungary) 1997	Did not qualify						
(Poland) 1999	Gold medal						
(France) 2001	6th						
(Greece) 2003	4th						
(Turkey) 2005	7th						
(Italy) 2007	Did not qualify						
(Latvia) 2009	9th	6	2	4	8	7	1
(Poland) 2011	9th	6	1	5			
(France) 2013	Did not qualify				8	6	2
(Hungary) (Romania) 2015	18th	4	0	4	6	5	1
(Czech Republic) 2017	Did not qualify				4	1	3
(Serbia) (Latvia) 2019	Did not qualify				6	2	4
(France) (Spain) 2021	Did not qualify				6	1	3
(Slovenia) (Israel) 2023	Did not qualify				6	3	3
(Czech Republic) (Germany) (Italy) (Greece) 2025	Did not qualify				6	3	3
(Belgium) (Finland) (Sweden) (Lithuania) 2027	To be determined				To be determined		
Total							

== See also ==
- Basketball in Poland
- Poland women's national under-19 basketball team
- Poland women's national under-17 basketball team
- Poland women's national 3x3 team
- Polish women's basketball league (PLKK)
