= Czechoslovakia women's national basketball team =

Czechoslovakia
Olympic Games
- Appearances: 3
- Medals: None

World Cup
- Appearances: 8
- Medals: Silver: 1964, 1971; Bronze: 1957, 1959, 1967, 1975

EuroBasket Women
- Appearances: 22
- Medals: Silver: 1952, 1954, 1962, 1966, 1974, 1976, 1989; Bronze: 1950, 1956, 1958, 1960, 1964, 1972, 1978, 1981
Medal record
Event	1st	2nd	3rd
Olympic Games	0	0	0
FIBA World Cup	0	2	4
Eurobasket	0	7	8
Total	0	9	12

The Czechoslovakia women's national basketball team was the women's basketball side that represented Czechoslovakia in international competitions. After the country was peacefully dissolved in 1993, the team was succeeded by separate Czech and Slovak teams.

== Competition record ==
=== Olympic Games ===
Olympic Games					Pre-Olympic		
Year	Position	Pld	W	L	Pld	W	L
(Canada) 1976	4th	5	2	3			
(Soviet Union) 1980	did not qualify				9	6	3
(United States) 1984	did not qualify				10	4	6
(South Korea) 1988	8th	5	0	5	11	7	4
(Spain) 1992	6th	5	1	4	8	7	1
Total		15	3	12	38	24	14

=== FIBA Women's Basketball World Cup ===
FIBA World Cup				
Year	Position	Pld	W	L
(Chile) 1953	did not qualify			
(Brazil) 1957	Bronze medal	9	7	2
(Soviet Union) 1959	Bronze medal	7	5	2
(Peru) 1964	Silver medal	9	8	1
(Czechoslovakia) 1967	Bronze medal	6	4	2
(Brazil) 1971	Silver medal	9	7	2
(Colombia) 1975	Bronze medal	8	6	2
(South Korea) 1979	did not qualify			
(Brazil) 1983	did not qualify			
(Soviet Union) 1986	4th	7	4	3
(Malaysia) 1990	4th	8	4	4
Total		63	45	18

=== EuroBasket Women ===
EuroBasket Women				
Year	Position	Pld	W	L
(Italy) 1938	did not qualify			
(Hungary) 1950	Bronze medal	7	5	2
(Soviet Union) 1952	Silver medal	5	4	1
(Socialist Federal Republic of Yugoslavia) 1954	Silver medal	7	5	2
(Czechoslovakia) 1956	Bronze medal	8	7	1
(Poland) 1958	Bronze medal	7	5	2
(Bulgaria) 1960	Bronze medal	7	5	2
(France) 1962	Silver medal	6	4	2
(Hungary) 1964	Bronze medal	6	4	2
(Romania) 1966	Silver medal	7	6	1
(Italy) 1968	9th	8	6	2
(Netherlands) 1970	5th	7	5	2
(Bulgaria) 1972	Bronze medal	8	6	2
(Italy) 1974	Silver medal	8	7	1
(France) 1976	Silver medal	8	7	1
(Poland) 1978	Bronze medal	8	6	2
(Socialist Federal Republic of Yugoslavia) 1980	4th	8	5	3
(Italy) 1981	Bronze medal	7	4	3
(Hungary) 1983	6th	7	3	4
(Italy) 1985	4th	7	3	4
(Spain) 1987	4th	7	4	3
(Bulgaria) 1989	Silver medal	5	3	2
(Israel) 1991	5th	5	3	2
Total		153	107	46

== Last Czechoslovakia Women's Basketball Roster ==
Czechoslovakia 1992 Olympic Games Women's Basketball roster
Players
Coaches

Pos.	No.	Nat.	Name	Ht.	Wt.	Age
PG	4	(Czech Republic) (Slovakia)	Bieliková, Iveta	1.71 m (5 ft 7 in)	58 kg (128 lb)	26 – 17 August 1966
SF	5	(Czech Republic) (Czech Republic)	Liptáková, Martina	1.82 m (6 ft 0 in)	70 kg (154 lb)	27 – 27 September 1965
C	6	(Czech Republic) (Slovakia)	Kotočová, Anna	1.89 m (6 ft 2 in)	86 kg (190 lb)	25 – 6 April 1968
SF	7	(Czech Republic) (Czech Republic)	Němcová, Eva	1.87 m (6 ft 2 in)	75 kg (165 lb)	20 – 3 December 1972
G	8	(Czech Republic) (Slovakia)	Chupíková, Andrea	1.81 m (5 ft 11 in)	67 kg (148 lb)	22 – 16 July 1971
	9	(Czech Republic) (Slovakia)	Antalecová, Eva	1.78 m (5 ft 10 in)	65 kg (143 lb)	27 – 18 January 1966
C	10	(Czech Republic) (Slovakia)	Hiráková, Renáta	1.90 m (6 ft 3 in)	78 kg (172 lb)	22 – 27 May 1971
SF	11	(Czech Republic) (Slovakia)	Chamajová, Adriana	1.78 m (5 ft 10 in)	65 kg (143 lb)	22 – 1 February 1971
C	12	(Czech Republic) (Slovakia)	Dobrovičová, Erika	1.92 m (6 ft 4 in)	80 kg (176 lb)	25 – 10 September 1967
C	13	(Czech Republic) (Czech Republic)	Vodičková, Kamila	1.88 m (6 ft 2 in)	84 kg (185 lb)	20 – 19 December 1972
	14	(Czech Republic) (Slovakia)	Rázgová, Milena	0.00 m (0 in)	00 kg (0 lb)	23 – 2 November 1969
C	15	(Czech Republic) (Slovakia)	Berková, Eva	1.94 m (6 ft 4 in)	80 kg (176 lb)	27 – 23 October 1965

Head coach

- (Czech Republic) Miroslav Vondřička

Legend

- (C) Team captain
- Date – 8 August 1993
- Injured

- Roster
Updated: 3 January 2025
