= Hungary women's national basketball team =

Hungary
- FIBA ranking: 19 ▲1 (18 March 2026)
- Joined FIBA: 1935
- FIBA zone: FIBA Europe
- National federation: Magyar Kosárlabdázók Országos Szövetsége
- Coach: Péter Völgyi

Olympic Games
- Appearances: 1

World Cup
- Appearances: 6

EuroBasket Women
- Appearances: 32
- Medals: : 1950, 1956 : 1952, 1983, 1985, 1987, 1991
Home	Away

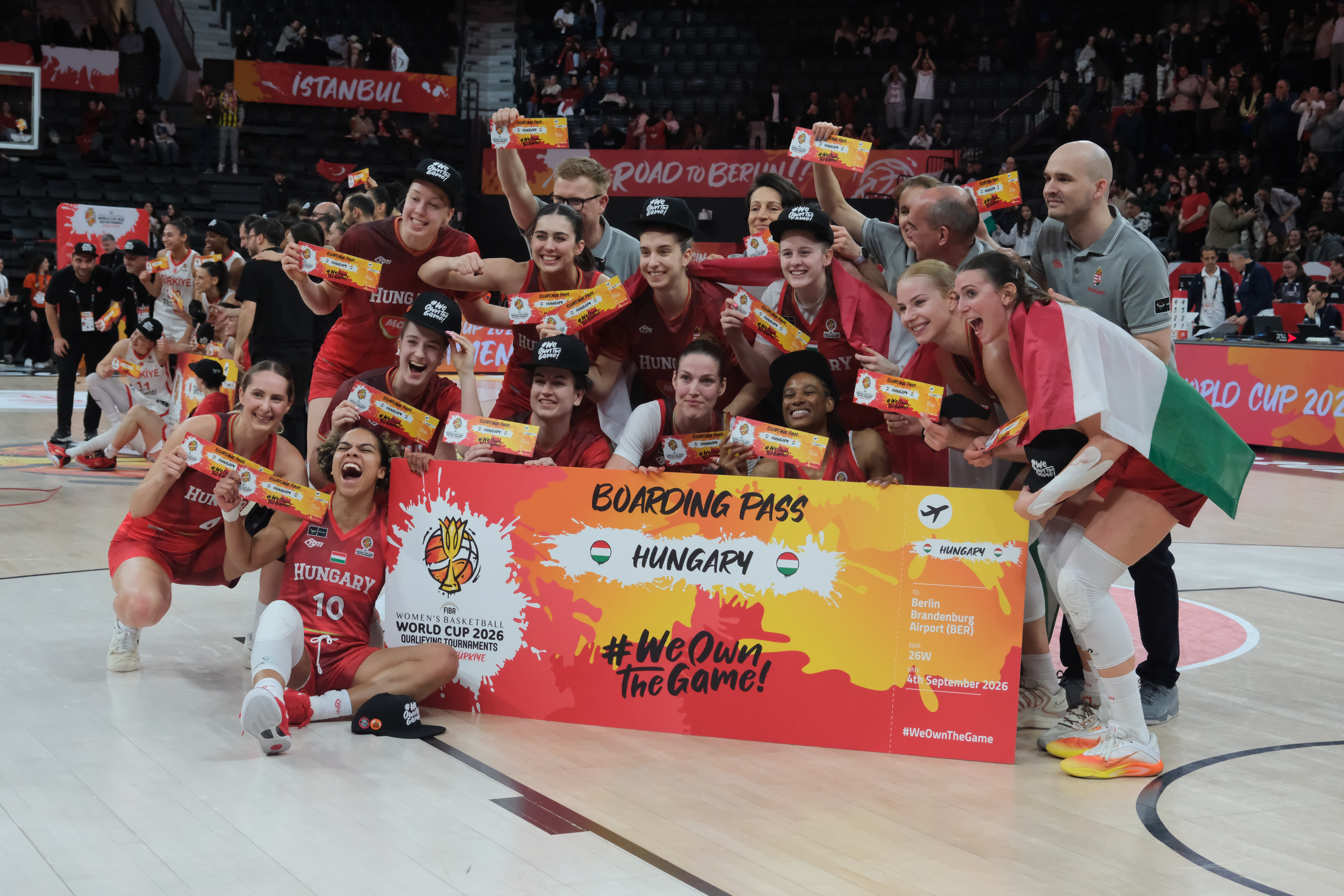
2026 FIBA Women's Basketball World Cup Qualifying Tournament roster with Berlin ticket

The Hungary women's national basketball team is the team representing Hungary in international women's basketball competitions, organized and run by the Magyar Kosárlabdázók Országos Szövetsége, the governing body of basketball in the country.

== Competition records ==
=== Olympic Games ===
- 1980: 4th

=== FIBA World Championship ===
- 1957 – 5th
- 1959 – 7th
- 1975 – 9th
- 1986 – 8th
- 1998 – 10th
- 2026 – 8th

=== EuroBasket ===
EuroBasket Women					Qualification		
Year	Position	Pld	W	L	Pld	W	L
(Italy) 1938	Did not enter						
(Hungary) 1950	Silver medal	7	6	1			
(Soviet Union) 1952	Bronze medal	5	3	2			
(Socialist Federal Republic of Yugoslavia) 1954	4th	5	2	3			
(Czechoslovakia) 1956	Silver medal	8	6	2			
(Poland) 1958	7th						
(Bulgaria) 1960	9th						
(France) 1962	7th						
(Hungary) 1964	8th						
(Romania) 1966	9th						
(Italy) 1968	10th						
(Netherlands) 1970	10th						
(Bulgaria) 1972	6th						
(Italy) 1974	4th	8	5	3			
(France) 1976	8th						
(Poland) 1978	6th						
(Socialist Federal Republic of Yugoslavia) 1980	7th						
(Italy) 1981	7th						
(Hungary) 1983	Bronze medal	7	5	2			
(Italy) 1985	Bronze medal	7	5	2			
(Spain) 1987	Bronze medal	7	5	2			
(Bulgaria) 1989	7th						
(Israel) 1991	Bronze medal	5	3	2	5	4	1
(Italy) 1993	8th						
(Czech Republic) 1995	12th						
(Hungary) 1997	4th	8	4	4			
(Poland) 1999	Did not enter						
(France) 2001	7th						
(Greece) 2003	10th	7	2	5			
(Turkey) 2005	Did not enter						
(Italy) 2007	Did not enter						
(Latvia) 2009	14th	3	0	3	8	5	3
(Poland) 2011	Did not qualify				8	2	6
(France) 2013	Did not qualify				8	5	3
(Hungary) (Romania) 2015	17th	4	1	3			
(Czech Republic) 2017	12th	4	1	3	6	5	1
(Serbia) (Latvia) 2019	7th	5	2	3	6	4	2
(France) (Spain) 2021	Did not qualify				4	2	2
(Israel) (Slovenia) 2023	4th	6	3	3	6	4	2
(Czech Republic) (Germany) (Italy) (Greece) 2025	Did not qualify				6	3	3
(Belgium) (Finland) (Sweden) (Lithuania) 2027	To be determined				To be determined		
Total		96	53	43	57	34	23

== Team ==
=== Current roster ===
Roster for the 2026 FIBA Women's Basketball World Cup.

Hungary women's national basketball team roster
Players
Coaches

Pos.	No.	Name	Age – Date of birth	Height	Club	Ctr.
C	2	Virág Kiss (C)	28 – 12 April 1998	1.94 m (6 ft 4 in)	Valencia Basket	(Spain)
PG	7	Veronika Kányási	27 – 27 May 1999	1.78 m (5 ft 10 in)	DVTK	(Hungary)
PG	8	Eszter Rátkai	19 – 14 December 2006	1.78 m (5 ft 10 in)	KSC Szekszárd	(Hungary)
G	9	Ágnes Studer	27 – 10 September 1998	1.68 m (5 ft 6 in)	PEAC-Pécs	(Hungary)
PG	10	Nina Aho	29 – 24 June 1997	1.75 m (5 ft 9 in)	DVTK	(Hungary)
C	11	Kinga Josepovits	18 – 2 January 2008	1.96 m (6 ft 5 in)	PEAC-Pécs	(Hungary)
SF	13	Ágnes Török	28 – 23 January 1998	1.83 m (6 ft 0 in)	PEAC-Pécs	(Hungary)
PF	14	Dorka Juhász	26 – 18 December 1999	1.95 m (6 ft 5 in)	Minnesota Lynx	(United States)
SG	21	Réka Lelik	27 – 14 April 1999	1.79 m (5 ft 10 in)	Emlak Konut SK	(Turkey)
PG	22	Yvonne Turner	38 – 13 October 1987	1.78 m (5 ft 10 in)	Polonia Warsaw	(Poland)
G	33	Panka Dúl	25 – 23 October 2000	1.78 m (5 ft 10 in)	ETO Basket	(Hungary)
C	55	Judit Barnai	32 – 17 January 1994	1.88 m (6 ft 2 in)	Ceglédi EKK	(Hungary)

Head coach

- (Hungary) Péter Völgyi

Assistant coach(es)

- (Romania) Marta Abraham
- (Hungary) Kornel Varadi

Legend

- (C) Team captain
- Club – describes last
  club before the tournament
- Age – describes age
  on 4 September 2026

=== Head coach position ===
- Norbert Szekely – 2010, 2011
- Sándor Farkas – 2013–2014
- Štefan Svitek – since 2015

== See also ==
- Hungary women's national under-19 basketball team
- Hungary women's national under-17 basketball team
- Hungary women's national 3x3 team
