= Marjana Bremec Homar =

Yugoslav and Slovenian basketball player

Personal information
- Born: June 6, 1946 (age 80) Ljubljana, SFR Yugoslavia

Career history
- Olimpija
Medals
Women's basketball
Representing Yugoslavia
EuroBasket Women
Silver medal – second place	1968 Italy	Team
European U18 Championship
Silver medal – second place	1965 Bulgaria	Team

Marjana Bremec Homar (born June 6, 1946) is a Yugoslav and Slovenian former female basketball player.
