= EuroBasket Women 1966 =

EuroBasket 1966 Women
10th FIBA European Women's Basketball Championship

Tournament details
- Host country: Romania
- Teams: 12

Final positions
- Champions: Soviet Union (8th title)

Official website
- Official website (archive)

The 1966 European Women Basketball Championship, commonly called EuroBasket Women 1966, was the 10th regional championship held by FIBA Europe. The competition was held in Romania. Soviet Union won the gold medal and Czechoslovakia the silver medal while East Germany won the bronze.

== Group stage ==
=== Group A ===
Pl	Team	Pld	W	L	PF	PA
1	(Czech Republic) Czechoslovakia	5	5	0	362	239
2	East Germany	5	4	1	381	287
3	Bulgaria	5	3	2	308	268
4	(Socialist Federal Republic of Yugoslavia) Yugoslavia	5	2	3	360	342
5	France	5	1	4	250	315
6	West Germany	5	0	5	206	416

October 1 18:30	East Germany	105–51	West Germany
October 1 19:50	Bulgaria	63–56	France
October 1 21:10	Czechoslovakia (Czech Republic)	74–56	(Socialist Federal Republic of Yugoslavia) Yugoslavia
October 2 18:00	Bulgaria	75–30	West Germany
October 2 19:20	Yugoslavia (Socialist Federal Republic of Yugoslavia)	74–60	France
October 2 20:40	Czechoslovakia (Czech Republic)	69–54	East Germany
October 3 18:00	Czechoslovakia (Czech Republic)	87–33	West Germany
October 3 19:20	East Germany	72–45	France
October 3 20:40	Bulgaria	67–55	(Socialist Federal Republic of Yugoslavia) Yugoslavia
October 4 18:00	France	48–39	West Germany
October 4 19:20	East Germany	88–74	(Socialist Federal Republic of Yugoslavia) Yugoslavia
October 4 20:40	Czechoslovakia (Czech Republic)	65–55	Bulgaria
October 5 18:00	Yugoslavia (Socialist Federal Republic of Yugoslavia)	101–53	West Germany
October 5 19:20	Czechoslovakia (Czech Republic)	67–41	France
October 5 20:40	East Germany	62–48	Bulgaria

=== Group B ===
Pl	Team	Pld	W	L	PF	PA
1	Soviet Union	5	5	0	385	229
2	Romania	5	4	1	365	309
3	Poland	5	3	2	345	284
4	Netherlands	5	2	3	283	353
5	Italy	5	1	4	236	328
6	Hungary	5	0	5	245	356

October 1 18:00	Poland	72–52	Hungary
October 1 19:20	Soviet Union	87–26	Italy
October 1 20:40	Romania	86–67	Netherlands
October 2 18:00	Netherlands	48–45	Italy
October 2 19:20	Soviet Union	78–33	Hungary
October 2 20:40	Romania	66–64	Poland
October 3 18:00	Soviet Union	76–45	Netherlands
October 3 19:20	Poland	73–48	Italy
October 3 20:40	Romania	73–45	Hungary
October 4 18:00	Poland	76–50	Netherlands
October 4 19:20	Soviet Union	76–65	Romania
October 4 20:40	Italy	60–45	Hungary
October 5 18:00	Netherlands	73–70	Hungary
October 5 19:20	Soviet Union	68–60	Poland
October 5 20:40	Romania	75–57	Italy

== Play-off stages ==
Semifinals
October 8 20:40
(Czech Republic) Czechoslovakia	83
Romania	54
October 8 19:20
Soviet Union	93
East Germany	69

Final
October 9 19:50
(Czech Republic) Czechoslovakia	66
Soviet Union	74
Third place
October 9 18:40
Romania	60
East Germany	65

9th to 12th places
October 7 10:00	Hungary	66–65	France
October 7 10:20	Italy	63–50	West Germany
5th to 8th places
October 8 11:40	Yugoslavia (Socialist Federal Republic of Yugoslavia)	70–67	Poland
October 8 18:00	Netherlands	56–53	Bulgaria
11th place
October 9 10:00	France	71–43	West Germany
9th place
October 9 10:00	Hungary	65–57	Italy
7th place
October 9 16:00	Bulgaria	70–56	Poland
5th place
October 9 17:20	Netherlands	66–57	(Socialist Federal Republic of Yugoslavia) Yugoslavia

1966 FIBA European Women's Basketball Championship champion

Soviet Union
Eighth title

== Final ranking ==
Rank	Team	PE
Gold medal	Soviet Union	Same position
Silver medal	(Czech Republic) Czechoslovakia	▲1
Bronze medal	East Germany	▲3
4	Romania	Same position
5	Netherlands	New entry
6	(Socialist Federal Republic of Yugoslavia) Yugoslavia	▲1
7	Bulgaria	▼5
8	Poland	▼3
9	Hungary	▼1
10	Italy	▼1
11	France	▼1
12	West Germany	New entry
