= EuroBasket Women 1958 =

EuroBasket 1958 Women
6th FIBA European Women's Basketball Championship

Tournament details
- Host country: Poland
- Dates: May 9–18
- Teams: 10
- Venue: 1 (in 1 host city)

Final positions
- Champions: Bulgaria (1st title)

Official website
- Official website (archive)

The 1958 European Women's Basketball Championship was the 6th regional championship held by FIBA Europe for women. The competition was held in Łódź, Poland and took place May 9–18, 1958. Bulgaria won their first gold medal, while the Soviet Union, champions of the previous edition received the silver. Czechoslovakia won the bronze medal.

== Preliminary round ==
The teams where divided into three groups. The first two from each group would go to the Final Round. The remaining teams went to the Classification Round to determine the 7th–10th spots.

=== Group A ===
Rank	Team	W	L	Pts	Diff
1	Soviet Union	2	0	4	+74
2	France	1	1	3	−3
3	East Germany	0	2	2	−71

May 9, 1958
10:00

East Germany 25, Soviet Union 74
Scoring by half: 13–39, 12–35
Pts: Kobek (7)	Pts: Eremina (12)

May 10, 1958
10:00

East Germany 29, France 51
Scoring by half: 9–18, 20–33
Pts: Kobek (9)	Pts: Kloechner-Tavert (13)

May 11, 1958
19:30

Soviet Union 66, France 41
Scoring by half: 34–17, 32–24
Pts: Maksimelianova (13)	Pts: Stephan (7)

=== Group B ===
Rank	Team	W	L	Pts	Diff
1	Poland	3	0	6	+85
2	Yugoslavia	2	1	5	+16
3	Hungary	1	2	4	+6
4	Netherlands	0	3	3	−107

May 9, 1958
11:30

Hungary 37, Yugoslavia 40
Scoring by half: 13–22, 24–18
Pts: Noficzer (12)	Pts: Kalusevic (14)

May 9, 1958
18:30

Netherlands 32, Poland 81
Scoring by half: 19–47, 13–34
Pts: van der Velde-Remeyer (9)	Pts: Chlodzinska-Urbaniak (20)

May 10, 1958
18:00

Netherlands 24, Hungary 49
Scoring by half: 10–17, 14–32
Pts: Koper-van Es (6)	Pts: Lick (8)

May 10, 1958
19:30

Yugoslavia (Socialist Federal Republic of Yugoslavia) 47, Poland 67
Scoring by half: 25–32, 22–35
Pts: Kalusevic (14)	Pts: Gruszczynska-Olesiewicz (25)

May 11, 1958
11:30

Netherlands 39, Yugoslavia 72
Scoring by half: 23–35, 16–37
Pts: Jansen-van Gent (11)	Pts: Ciprus (17)

May 11, 1958
18:00

Hungary 40, Poland 56
Scoring by half: 16–26, 24–30
Pts: Noficzer (9)	Pts: Gruszczynska-Olesiewicz (18)

=== Group C ===
Rank	Team	W	L	Pts	Diff
1	Czechoslovakia	2	0	4	+60
2	Bulgaria	1	1	3	+19
3	Austria	0	2	2	−79

May 9, 1958
20:00

Bulgaria 42, Czechoslovakia 55
Scoring by half: 18–26, 24–29
Pts: Rangelova (11)	Pts: Moutellikova-Kocandrlova (14)

May 10, 1958
11:30

Austria 20, Czechoslovakia 67
Scoring by half: 8–30, 12–37
Pts: Hantschel (8)	Pts: Zachvejova-Novakova (20)

May 11, 1958
10:00

Austria 34, Bulgaria 66
Scoring by half: 15–38, 19–28
Pts: Hantschel (9)	Pts: Vojnova (14)

== Classification round ==
Rank	Team	W	L	Pts	Diff
1	Hungary	3	0	6	+58
2	Netherlands	2	1	5	−12
3	East Germany	1	2	4	+8
4	Austria	0	3	3	−54

May 13, 1958
10:00

East Germany 35, Hungary 53
Scoring by half: 16–26, 19–27
Pts: Heiss (10)	Pts: Gyimes (10)

May 14, 1958
10:00

Netherlands 42, Austria 34
Scoring by half: 21–19, 21–15
Pts: Fronczek-Gootjes (15)	Pts: Fuchs (10)

May 15, 1958
10:00

Hungary 70, Austria 52
Scoring by half: 31–25, 39–27
Pts: Noficzer (14)	Pts: Fuchs (15)

May 17, 1958
10:00

East Germany 42, Netherlands 44
Scoring by half: 16–19, 26–25
Pts: Heiss (17)	Pts: van der Velde-Remeyer (16)

May 18, 1958
10:00

Austria 31, East Germany 59
Scoring by half: 14–28, 17–31
Pts: Lange (8)	Pts: Schulze (19)

May 18, 1958
11:30

Netherlands 24, Hungary 46
Scoring by half: 9–19, 15–27
Pts: Fronczek-Gootjes (6)	Pts: Halasz-Padarne (12)

== Final round ==
Rank	Team	W	L	Pts	Diff
1	Bulgaria	5	0	10	+92
2	Soviet Union	4	1	9	+97
3	Czechoslovakia	3	2	8	+28
4	Yugoslavia	2	3	7	−54
5	Poland	1	4	6	+8
6	France	0	5	5	−171

May 13, 1958
11:30

France 23, Bulgaria 70
Scoring by half: 12–38, 11–32
Pts: Etienne-Planque (7)	Pts: Calaskanova (17)

May 13, 1958
18:00

Poland 50, Yugoslavia 61
Scoring by half: 22–33, 28–28
Pts: Gruszczynska-Olesiewicz (20)	Pts: Ciprus (22)

May 13, 1958
19:30

Soviet Union 52, Czechoslovakia 46
Scoring by half: 24–24, 28–22
Pts: Otsa-Vishneva (13)	Pts: Theissigova (9)

May 14, 1958
11:30

Yugoslavia (Socialist Federal Republic of Yugoslavia) 39, Soviet Union 79
Scoring by half: 15–38, 24–41
Pts: Kalusevic (9)	Pts: Eremina (18)

May 14, 1958
18:00

Czechoslovakia 68, France 40
Scoring by half: 42–21, 26–19
Pts: Trojkova-Sulcova (16)	Pts: Kloechner-Tavert (14)

May 14, 1958
19:30

Bulgaria 53, Poland 48
Scoring by half: 28–23, 25–25
Pts: Calaskanova (17)	Pts: Chlodzinska-Urbaniak (14)

May 15, 1958
11:30

Yugoslavia (Socialist Federal Republic of Yugoslavia) 37, Bulgaria 63
Scoring by half: 20–29, 17–34
Pts: Radovanovic (16)	Pts: Vojnova (24)

May 15, 1958
18:00

Soviet Union 81, France 32
Scoring by half: 40–15, 41–17
Pts: Kostikova (16)	Pts: Ribot (10)

May 15, 1958
19:30

Poland 59, Czechoslovakia 61
Scoring by half: 24–30, 35–31
Pts: Chlodzinska-Urbaniak (20)	Pts: Theissigova (18)

May 17, 1958
11:30

France 48, Poland 79
Scoring by half: 22–38, 26–41
Pts: Kloechner-Tavert (13)	Pts: Gruszczynska-Olesiewicz (19)

May 17, 1958
18:00

Yugoslavia (Socialist Federal Republic of Yugoslavia) 37, Czechoslovakia 52
Scoring by half: 18–26, 19–26
Pts: Ciprus (16)	Pts: Grubrova-Horakova (12)

May 17, 1958
19:30

Bulgaria 54, Soviet Union 51 (OT)
Scoring by half: 25–22, 24–27 Overtime: 5–2
Pts: Vojnova (19)	Pts: Eremina (11)

May 18, 1958
15:00

Yugoslavia (Socialist Federal Republic of Yugoslavia) 64, France 48
Scoring by half: 35–29, 29–19
Pts: Kalusevic (23pts)	Pts: Mazel (14pts)

May 18, 1958
16:30

Bulgaria 55, Czechoslovakia 44
Scoring by half: 29–24, 26–20
Pts: Vojnova (22pts)	Pts: Veckova (12pts)

May 18, 1958
19:30

Soviet Union 65, Poland 60
Scoring by half: 35–35, 30–25
Pts: Kuznetsova-Mikhailova (16pts)	Pts: Chlodzinska-Urbaniak (21pts)

== Final standings ==
Rank	Team	Record
1	Bulgaria	6–1
2	Soviet Union	6–1
3	Czechoslovakia	5–2
4	Yugoslavia	4–4
5	Poland	4–4
6	France	1–6
7	Hungary	4–2
8	Netherlands	2–4
9	East Germany	1–4
10	Austria	0–5
