= France women's national basketball team =

Women's national basketball team representing France

France
- FIBA ranking: 2 (14 September 2026)
- FIBA zone: FIBA Europe
- National federation: FFBB
- Coach: Jean-Aimé Toupane
- Nickname: Les Bleues (The Blues)

Olympic Games
- Appearances: 5
- Medals: (silver) Silver: (2012, 2024); (bronze) Bronze: (2020)

World Cup
- Appearances: 12
- Medals: (silver) Silver: (2026); (bronze) Bronze: (1953)

EuroBasket
- Appearances: 35
- Medals: (gold) Gold: (2001, 2009); (silver) Silver: (1970, 1993, 1999, 2013, 2015, 2017, 2019, 2021); (bronze) Bronze: (2011, 2023)
Home	Away
Medal record
Event	1st	2nd	3rd
Olympic Games	0	2	1
Women's World Cup	0	1	1
EuroBasket Women	2	8	2
Mediterranean Games	0	1	1
Total	2	12	5

The France women's national basketball team (French: Équipe de France féminine de basketball) represents France in international women's basketball and is administered by the French Federation of Basketball. The team is nicknamed Les Bleues (The Blues). However, after their unexpected triumph at the 2009 EuroBasket the team earned the name Les Braqueuses (The Robbers) due their spectacular play. France is the leading nation in terms of EuroBasket Women qualifications. (Alongside Italy)

== Competitive record ==
=== Olympic Games ===
Olympic Games					Qualifying		
Year	Position	Pld	W	L	Pld	W	L
(Canada) 1976	Did not qualify				3	1	2
(Soviet Union) 1980	Did not qualify				8	3	5
(United States) 1984	Did not qualify						
(South Korea) 1988	Did not qualify				5	3	2
(Spain) 1992	Did not qualify						
(United States) 1996	Did not qualify						
(Australia) 2000	5th	7	5	2			
(Greece) 2004	Did not qualify						
(China) 2008	Did not qualify						
(United Kingdom) 2012	Silver medal	8	7	1	3	3	0
(Brazil) 2016	4th	8	4	4	3	3	0
(Japan) 2020	Bronze medal	6	3	3			
(France) 2024	Silver medal	6	4	2			
(United States) 2028	To be determined						
Total		35	23	12	22	13	9

=== FIBA Women's World Cup ===
Women's World Cup
Year	Position	Pld	W	L
(Chile) 1953	Bronze medal	6	4	2
(Brazil) 1957	Did not qualify			
(Soviet Union) 1959	Did not qualify			
(Peru) 1964	10th	8	3	5
(Czechoslovakia) 1967	Did not qualify			
(Brazil) 1971	6th	9	3	6
(Colombia) 1975	Did not qualify			
(South Korea) 1979	7th	8	2	6
(Brazil) 1983	Did not qualify			
(Soviet Union) 1986	Did not qualify			
(Malaysia) 1990	Did not qualify			
(Australia) 1994	9th	8	6	2
(Germany) 1998	Did not qualify			
(China) 2002	8th	9	4	5
(Brazil) 2006	5th	9	5	4
(Czech Republic) 2010	6th	9	5	4
(Turkey) 2014	7th	7	4	3
(Spain) 2018	5th	7	5	2
(Australia) 2022	7th	6	3	3
(Germany) 2026	Silver medal	6	5	1
(Japan) 2030	To be determined			
Total		92	49	43

=== EuroBasket Women ===
EuroBasket Women					Qualification		
Year	Position	Pld	W	L	Pld	W	L
(Italy) 1938	4th	4	1	3			
(Hungary) 1950	4th	7	4	3			
(Soviet Union) 1952	7th	5	3	2			
(Socialist Federal Republic of Yugoslavia) 1954	6th	8	2	6			
(Czechoslovakia) 1956	7th	8	4	4			
(Poland) 1958	6th	7	1	6			
(Bulgaria) 1960	Did not qualify						
(France) 1962	8th	5	1	4	7	5	2
(Hungary) 1964	10th	5	0	5			
(Romania) 1966	11th	7	2	5			
(Italy) 1968	11th	8	2	6	3	2	1
(Netherlands) 1970	Silver medal	7	5	2			
(Bulgaria) 1972	4th	8	5	3			
(Italy) 1974	7th	8	3	5			
(France) 1976	4th	6	3	3			
(Poland) 1978	4th	8	5	3			
(Socialist Federal Republic of Yugoslavia) 1980	11th	7	3	4			
(Italy) 1981	Did not qualify						
(Hungary) 1983	Did not qualify				4	3	1
(Italy) 1985	8th	7	3	4			
(Spain) 1987	8th	7	2	5			
(Bulgaria) 1989	8th	5	1	4	5	3	2
(Israel) 1991	Did not qualify				5	1	4
(Italy) 1993	Silver medal	5	3	2	5	4	1
(Czech Republic) 1995	11th	6	2	4			
(Hungary) 1997	Did not qualify				5	3	2
(Poland) 1999	Silver medal	8	6	2	5	4	1
(France) 2001	Gold medal	8	8	0			
(Greece) 2003	5th	8	5	3			
(Turkey) 2005	5th	8	6	2	6	5	1
(Italy) 2007	8th	9	4	5			
(Latvia) 2009	Gold medal	9	9	0	8	7	1
(Poland) 2011	Bronze medal	9	6	3			
(France) 2013	Silver medal	9	8	1			
(Hungary) (Romania) 2015	Silver medal	10	8	2			
(Czech Republic) 2017	Silver medal	6	5	1	6	6	0
(Latvia) (Serbia) 2019	Silver medal	6	5	1			
(France) (Spain) 2021	Silver medal	6	5	1	Qualified as co-host		
(Israel) (Slovenia) 2023	Bronze medal	6	5	1	6	5	1
(Czech Republic) (Germany) (Italy) (Greece) 2025	4th	6	4	2	6	6	0
(Belgium) (Finland) (Sweden) (Lithuania) 2027	To be determined				To be determined		
Total		246	139	107	71	54	17

== Team ==
=== Current roster ===
Roster for 2026 FIBA Women's Basketball World Cup.

France women's national basketball roster
Players
Coaches

Pos.	No.	Name	Age – Date of birth	Height	Club	Ctr.
PG	0	Carla Leite	22 – 16 April 2004	1.75 m (5 ft 9 in)	Portland Fire	(United States)
SF	11	Valériane Ayayi	32 – 29 April 1994	1.84 m (6 ft 0 in)	Phoenix Mercury	(United States)
F	13	Janelle Salaün	24 – 5 September 2001	1.88 m (6 ft 2 in)	Golden State Valkyries	(United States)
C	14	Dominique Malonga	20 – 16 November 2005	1.97 m (6 ft 6 in)	Seattle Storm	(United States)
F	15	Gabby Williams (C)	29 – 9 September 1996	1.80 m (5 ft 11 in)	Golden State Valkyries	(United States)
C	22	Marième Badiane	31 – 24 November 1994	1.90 m (6 ft 3 in)	Beşiktaş	(Turkey)
SG	23	Marine Johannès	31 – 21 January 1995	1.78 m (5 ft 10 in)	New York Liberty	(United States)
SG	28	Mamignan Touré	31 – 19 December 1994	1.83 m (6 ft 0 in)	USK Praha	(Czech Republic)
C	31	Aminata Gueye	24 – 10 July 2002	1.90 m (6 ft 3 in)	Golden State Valkyries	(Czech Republic)
PG	47	Romane Bernies	33 – 27 June 1993	1.70 m (5 ft 7 in)	BLMA	(France)
G	71	Leïla Lacan	22 – 2 June 2004	1.82 m (6 ft 0 in)	Connecticut Sun	(United States)
G	98	Pauline Astier	24 – 15 February 2002	1.79 m (5 ft 10 in)	New York Liberty	(United States)

Head coach

- (France) Jean-Aimé Toupane

Assistant coach(es)

- (France) David Gautier
- (France) Grégory Halin
- (France) Christophe Léonard

Legend

- (C) Team captain
- Club – describes last
  club before the tournament
- Age – describes age
  on 4 September 2026

=== Notable players ===

- Nicole Antibe
- Isabelle Fijalkowski
- Jacky Chazalon
- Céline Dumerc
- Christine Gomis
- Irène Guidotti
- Marine Johannès
- Gabby Williams
- Edwige Lawson
- Catherine Melain
- Lætitia Moussard
- Élisabeth Riffiod
- Odile Santaniello
- Laure Savasta
- Yannick Souvré

=== Successive coaches ===
- Alain Jardel
- Jacques Commères
- Pierre Vincent
- Valérie Garnier

== Media coverage ==
France's matches are currently broadcast by Canal+.

== See also ==
- France women's national under-20 basketball team
- France women's national under-19 basketball team
- France women's national under-17 basketball team
- France women's national 3x3 team
