= EuroBasket Women 1964 =

Sporting Event

EuroBasket 1964 Women
9th FIBA European Women's Basketball Championship

Tournament details
- Host country: Hungary
- Dates: 6 – 13 September
- Teams: 10

Final positions
- Champions: Soviet Union (7th title)

Official website
- Official website (archive)

The 1964 European Women Basketball Championship, commonly called EuroBasket Women 1964, was the 9th regional championship held by FIBA Europe. The competition was held in Hungary. Soviet Union won the gold medal and Bulgaria the silver medal while Czechoslovakia won the bronze.

== Group stage ==
=== Group A ===
Pl	Team	Pld	W	L	PF	PA
1	Soviet Union	4	4	0	288	153
2	Romania	4	2	2	177	205
3	Yugoslavia	4	2	2	186	203
4	Hungary	4	2	2	196	215
5	France	4	0	4	186	203

September 6 11:00	Romania	42–41	France
September 6 18:00	Hungary	55–54	(Socialist Federal Republic of Yugoslavia) Yugoslavia
September 7 17:30	Soviet Union	68–37	(Socialist Federal Republic of Yugoslavia) Yugoslavia
September 7 11:00	Hungary	62–40	France
September 8 11:00	Soviet Union	71–34	France
September 8 19:00	Romania	53–42	Hungary
September 9 17:30	Yugoslavia (Socialist Federal Republic of Yugoslavia)	54–43	France
September 9 20:30	Soviet Union	81–45	Romania
September 10 16:00	Yugoslavia (Socialist Federal Republic of Yugoslavia)	41–37	Romania
September 10 17:30	Soviet Union	68–37	Hungary

=== Group B ===
Pl	Team	Pld	W	L	PF	PA
1	Bulgaria	4	4	0	230	163
2	Czechoslovakia	4	3	1	216	176
3	Poland	4	2	2	178	190
4	East Germany	4	1	3	197	214
5	Italy	4	0	4	159	246

September 6 09:30	Bulgaria	49–37	Poland
September 6 20:00	Czechoslovakia (Czech Republic)	59–41	Italy
September 7 16:00	Bulgaria	64–46	East Germany
September 7 19:00	Poland	61–47	Italy
September 8 17:30	Czechoslovakia (Czech Republic)	47–31	Poland
September 8 20:30	East Germany	63–37	Italy
September 9 16:00	Czechoslovakia (Czech Republic)	64–41	East Germany
September 9 19:00	Bulgaria	63–34	Italy
September 10 19:00	Poland	49–47	East Germany
September 10 20:30	Bulgaria	54–46	(Czech Republic) Czechoslovakia

== Play-off stages ==
Semifinals
September 12 20:30
Soviet Union	63
(Czech Republic) Czechoslovakia	43
September 12 19:00
Bulgaria	66
Romania	44

Final
September 13 19:00
Soviet Union	55
Bulgaria	53
Third place
September 13 17:30
(Czech Republic) Czechoslovakia	68
Romania	47

9th place
September 12 09:30	Italy	50–43	France
5th to 8th places
September 12 11:00	East Germany	61–55	(Socialist Federal Republic of Yugoslavia) Yugoslavia
September 12 17:30	Poland	66–50	Hungary
7th place
September 13 09:30	Yugoslavia (Socialist Federal Republic of Yugoslavia)	56–49	Hungary
5th place
September 13 11:00	Poland	49–41	East Germany

1964 FIBA European Women's Basketball Championship champion

Soviet Union
Seventh title

== Final ranking ==
Rank	Team	PE
Gold medal	Soviet Union	Same position
Silver medal	Bulgaria	▲1
Bronze medal	(Czech Republic) Czechoslovakia	▼1
4	Romania	Same position
5	Poland	▲1
6	East Germany	New entry
7	(Socialist Federal Republic of Yugoslavia) Yugoslavia	▼2
8	Hungary	▼1
9	Italy	Same position
10	France	▼2
