= Bulgaria women's national basketball team =

Bulgaria
- FIBA ranking: 58 ▲3 (18 March 2026)
- Joined FIBA: 1935
- FIBA zone: FIBA Europe
- National federation: Bulgarian Basketball Federation
- Coach: Tatyana Gateva
- Nickname: лъвиците (The Lionesses)

Olympic Games
- Appearances: 3
- Medals: (silver) Silver: (1980)

World Cup
- Appearances: 6
- Medals: (silver) Silver: (1959); (bronze) Bronze: (1964)

EuroBasket
- Appearances: 22
- Medals: (gold) Gold: (1958); (silver) Silver: (1960, 1964, 1972, 1983, 1985); (bronze) Bronze: (1954, 1962, 1976, 1989)
Home	Away
Medal record
Event	1st	2nd	3rd
Olympic Games	0	1	1
FIBA World Cup	0	1	1
EuroBasket	0	2	1
Balkan Championship	1	0	0
Friendship Games	0	1	0
Summer Universiade	1	0	1
Total	2	5	4

The Bulgaria women's national basketball team (Bulgarian: България отбор жени национален по баскетбол) represents Bulgaria in international women's basketball, and is controlled by the Bulgarian Basketball Federation. Their achievements range from winning the 1958 EuroBasket Women's Championship, and the Balkan Championship in 1960. Other successes came with the team finishing as runners-up at the 1980 Summer Olympics and the 1959 FIBA Women's World Cup. The national team has several members playing their professional basketball careers in the United States WNBA.

== Competitive record ==
=== Olympic Games ===
Year	Result
(Canada) 1976	Third place (bronze)
(Soviet Union) 1980	Runners-up (silver)

=== World Cup ===
Year	Result
(Soviet Union) 1959	Runners-up (silver)
(Soviet Union) 1964	Third place (bronze)

=== EuroBasket ===
Year	Result
(Socialist Federal Republic of Yugoslavia) 1954	Third place (bronze)
(Poland) 1958	Champions (gold)
(Bulgaria) 1960	Runners-up (silver)
(France) 1962	Third place (bronze)
(Hungary) 1964	Runners-up (silver)
(Bulgaria) 1972	Runners-up (silver)
(France) 1976	Third place (bronze)
(Hungary) 1983	Runners-up (silver)
(Italy) 1985	Runners-up (silver)
(Bulgaria) 1989	Third place (bronze)

=== Friendship Games ===
Year	Result
(Soviet Union) 1984	Runners-up (silver)

=== Balkan Championship ===
Year	Result
(Bulgaria) 1960	Champions (gold)

=== Summer Universiade ===
Year	Result
(Bulgaria) 1961	Champions (gold)
(Bulgaria) 1977	Third place (bronze)

== Current roster ==
Roster for EuroBasket Women 2025 qualifiers.

Bulgaria women's national basketball team roster
Players
Coaches

Pos.	No.	Name	Age – Date of birth	Height	Club	Ctr.
C	00	Khaalia Hillsman	28 – 1 August 1996	1.96 m (6 ft 5 in)	Beşiktaş JK	(Turkey)
G	1	Valeria Aleksieva	24 – 10 August 2000	1.66 m (5 ft 5 in)	BC Šiauliai-Vilmers	(Lithuania)
F	5	Yuliyana Valcheva	25 – 3 May 1999	1.84 m (6 ft 0 in)	Montana 2003	(Bulgaria)
PF	6	Katrin Stoichkova	25 – 14 November 1999	1.78 m (5 ft 10 in)	Rhodigium Basket AD	(Italy)
F	7	Borislava Hristova	28 – 12 July 1996	1.81 m (5 ft 11 in)	Spar Girona	(Spain)
G	8	Denitsa Manolova	18 – 6 September 2006	1.76 m (5 ft 9 in)	Rilski Sportist	(Bulgaria)
C	9	Aleksandra Petrova	26 – 25 July 1998	1.78 m (5 ft 10 in)	BC Beroe	(Bulgaria)
G	12	Viktoriya Ivanova	20 – 11 March 2004	1.70 m (5 ft 7 in)	Les Sangliers Wooltz	(Luxembourg)
SF	13	Radostina Dimitrova	30 – 19 October 1994	1.81 m (5 ft 11 in)	BC Beroe	(Bulgaria)
F	15	Violeta Grigorova	22 – 11 January 2002	1.80 m (5 ft 11 in)	Rilski Sportist	(Bulgaria)
PF	16	Zlatka Madankova	22 – 16 November 2002	1.85 m (6 ft 1 in)	BC Beroe	(Bulgaria)
G	19	Deana Stoyanovska	20 – 19 March 2004	1.72 m (5 ft 8 in)	BC Beroe	(Bulgaria)
SG	20	Ivana Nikolova	23 – 13 June 2001	1.85 m (6 ft 1 in)	Levhartice Chomutov	(Czech Republic)
PG	23	Gergana Ivanova	25 – 22 September 1999	1.75 m (5 ft 9 in)	A.Dil Brixia Basket	(Italy)
F	27	Yana Karamfilova	19 – 16 December 2005	1.88 m (6 ft 2 in)	BC Beroe	(Bulgaria)
PG	33	Karina Konstantinova	25 – 21 October 1999	1.68 m (5 ft 6 in)	Rutronik Stars Keltern	(Germany)
C	34	Preslava Koleva	25 – 12 August 1999	1.90 m (6 ft 3 in)	BC Pharmaserv Marburg	(Germany)
F	35	Gabriela Nikolova	27 – 1 June 1997	1.90 m (6 ft 3 in)	Montana 2003	(Bulgaria)
SG	77	Iva Kostova	30 – 2 September 1994	1.80 m (5 ft 11 in)	US Le Poinçonnet	(France)
F	99	Iliyana Georgieva	21 – 30 October 2003	1.83 m (6 ft 0 in)	ASD Nuova Jolly	(Italy)

Head coach

- (Bulgaria) Tatyana Gateva

Assistant coach(es)

- (Bosnia and Herzegovina) Matea Tavić
- (Bulgaria) Manuel Markov

Legend

- Date – 30 December 2024
