= Soviet Union women's national basketball team =

Former women's national basketball team representing the Soviet Union

Soviet Union
- FIBA ranking: defunct
- Joined FIBA: 1947
- FIBA zone: FIBA Europe
- National federation: Soviet Basketball Federation
- Coach: Various

Olympic Games
- Appearances: 3
- Medals: (gold) Gold: (1976, 1980); (bronze) Bronze: (1988)

World Cup
- Appearances: 9
- Medals: (gold) Gold: (1959, 1964, 1967, 1971, 1975, 1983); (silver) Silver: (1957, 1986)

EuroBasket Women
- Appearances: 22
- Medals: (gold) Gold: (1950, 1952, 1954, 1956, 1960, 1962, 1964, 1966, 1968, 1970, 1972, 1974, 1976, 1978, 1980, 1981, 1983, 1985, 1987, 1989, 1991); (silver) Silver: (1958)
Home	Away

The Soviet Union women's national basketball team (Russian: Сбо́рная СССР по баскетболу, romanized: sbórnaya SSSR po basketbolu) was the women's basketball side that represented the Soviet Union in international competitions. After the dissolution of the Soviet Union in 1991, the successor countries all set up their own national teams.

== Competition record ==
=== Olympic Games ===
Olympic Games					Qualification		
Year	Position	Pld	W	L	Pld	W	L
(Canada) 1976	Gold medal	5	5	0			
(Soviet Union) 1980	Gold medal	6	6	0			
(United States) 1984	withdrew						
(South Korea) 1988	Bronze medal	5	3	2	5	5	0
(Spain) 1992	Gold medal	5	4	1	7	7	0
Total		21	18	3	12	12	0

=== FIBA World Championship ===
FIBA World Championship					Qualification		
Year	Position	Pld	W	L	Pld	W	L
(Chile) 1953	did not participate						
(Brazil) 1957	Silver medal	8	7	1			
(Soviet Union) 1959	Gold medal	7	7	0			
(Peru) 1964	Gold medal	9	9	0			
(Czechoslovakia) 1967	Gold medal	7	7	0			
(Brazil) 1971	Gold medal	9	9	0			
(Colombia) 1975	Gold medal	8	8	0			
(South Korea) 1979	withdrew						
(Brazil) 1983	Gold medal	10	10	0			
(Soviet Union) 1986	Silver medal	7	6	1			
(Malaysia) 1990	5th	8	6	2			
Total		73	69	4			

=== EuroBasket Women ===
EuroBasket Women					Qualification		
Year	Position	Pld	W	L	Pld	W	L
(Italy) 1938	did not participate						
(Hungary) 1950	Gold medal	7	7	0			
(Soviet Union) 1952	Gold medal	5	5	0			
(Socialist Federal Republic of Yugoslavia) 1954	Gold medal	7	7	0			
(Czechoslovakia) 1956	Gold medal	8	8	0			
(Poland) 1958	Silver medal	7	6	1			
(Bulgaria) 1960	Gold medal	7	7	0			
(France) 1962	Gold medal	6	6	0			
(Hungary) 1964	Gold medal	6	6	0			
(Romania) 1966	Gold medal	7	7	0			
(Italy) 1968	Gold medal	9	9	0			
(Netherlands) 1970	Gold medal	7	7	0			
(Bulgaria) 1972	Gold medal	8	8	0			
(Italy) 1974	Gold medal	8	8	0			
(France) 1976	Gold medal	8	8	0			
(Poland) 1978	Gold medal	8	8	0			
(Socialist Federal Republic of Yugoslavia) 1980	Gold medal	5	5	0			
(Italy) 1981	Gold medal	7	7	0			
(Hungary) 1983	Gold medal	7	7	0			
(Italy) 1985	Gold medal	7	7	0			
(Spain) 1987	Gold medal	7	7	0			
(Bulgaria) 1989	Gold medal	5	5	0			
(Israel) 1991	Gold medal	5	4	1			
Total		151	149	2			

== Last Soviet Union Women's Basketball Roster ==
Soviet Union EuroBasket Women 1991 roster
Players
Coaches

Pos.	No.	Nat.	Name	Ht.	Wt.	Age
SG	4	(Soviet Union) (Ukraine)	Zhirko, Elena	1.80 m (5 ft 11 in)	000 kg (0 lb)	23 – 16 February 1968
F/C	5	(Soviet Union) (Russia)	Baranova, Elena	1.92 m (6 ft 4 in)	83 kg (183 lb)	19 – 28 January 1972
G	6	(Soviet Union) (Russia)	Rutkovskaya, Irina	1.76 m (5 ft 9 in)	67 kg (148 lb)	22 – 14 January 1969
SG	7	(Soviet Union) (Russia)	Mozgovaia, Elena	000 m (0 in)	000 kg (0 lb)	21 – 28 March 1970
SG	8	(Soviet Union) (Russia)	Bourmistrova, Marina	2.05 m (6 ft 9 in)	000 kg (0 lb)	17 – 3 February 1974
G	9	(Soviet Union) (Ukraine)	Tkachenko, Maryna	1.86 m (6 ft 1 in)	000 kg (0 lb)	25 – 29 August 1965
SG	10	(Soviet Union) (Russia)	Minkh, Irina	1.86 m (6 ft 1 in)	64 kg (141 lb)	27 – 16 April 1964
C	11	(Soviet Union) (Russia)	Khoudachova, Elena	1.95 m (6 ft 5 in)	78 kg (172 lb)	26 – 10 July 1965
G	12	(Soviet Union) (Russia)	Soumnikova, Irina	1.70 m (5 ft 7 in)	60 kg (132 lb)	26 – 15 October 1964
C	13	(Soviet Union) (Russia)	Shakirova, Elen	1.90 m (6 ft 3 in)	86 kg (190 lb)	21 – 2 June 1970
C	14	(Soviet Union) (Russia)	Zasulskaya, Natalia	1.91 m (6 ft 3 in)	95 kg (209 lb)	22 – 28 May 1969
SF	15	(Soviet Union) (Russia)	Zaboloueva, Svetlana	1.80 m (5 ft 11 in)	70 kg (154 lb)	24 – 20 August 1966

Head coach

- (Soviet Union) (Russia) Evgeny Gomelsky

Legend

- (C) Team captain
- Date – August 1991
- Injured

- Roster
Updated: 1 January 2025

== See also ==
- Russia women's national basketball team
- Soviet Union women's national under-17 basketball team
- Soviet Union women's national under-19 basketball team
