= Romania women's national basketball team =

Romania
- FIBA ranking: 62 ▼2 (14 September 2026)
- FIBA zone: FIBA Europe
- National federation: FRB
- Coach: Ayhan Avci

Olympic Games
- Appearances: None

World Cup
- Appearances: 1 (1959)
- Medals: None

EuroBasket Women
- Appearances: 24
- Medals: None
Home	Away

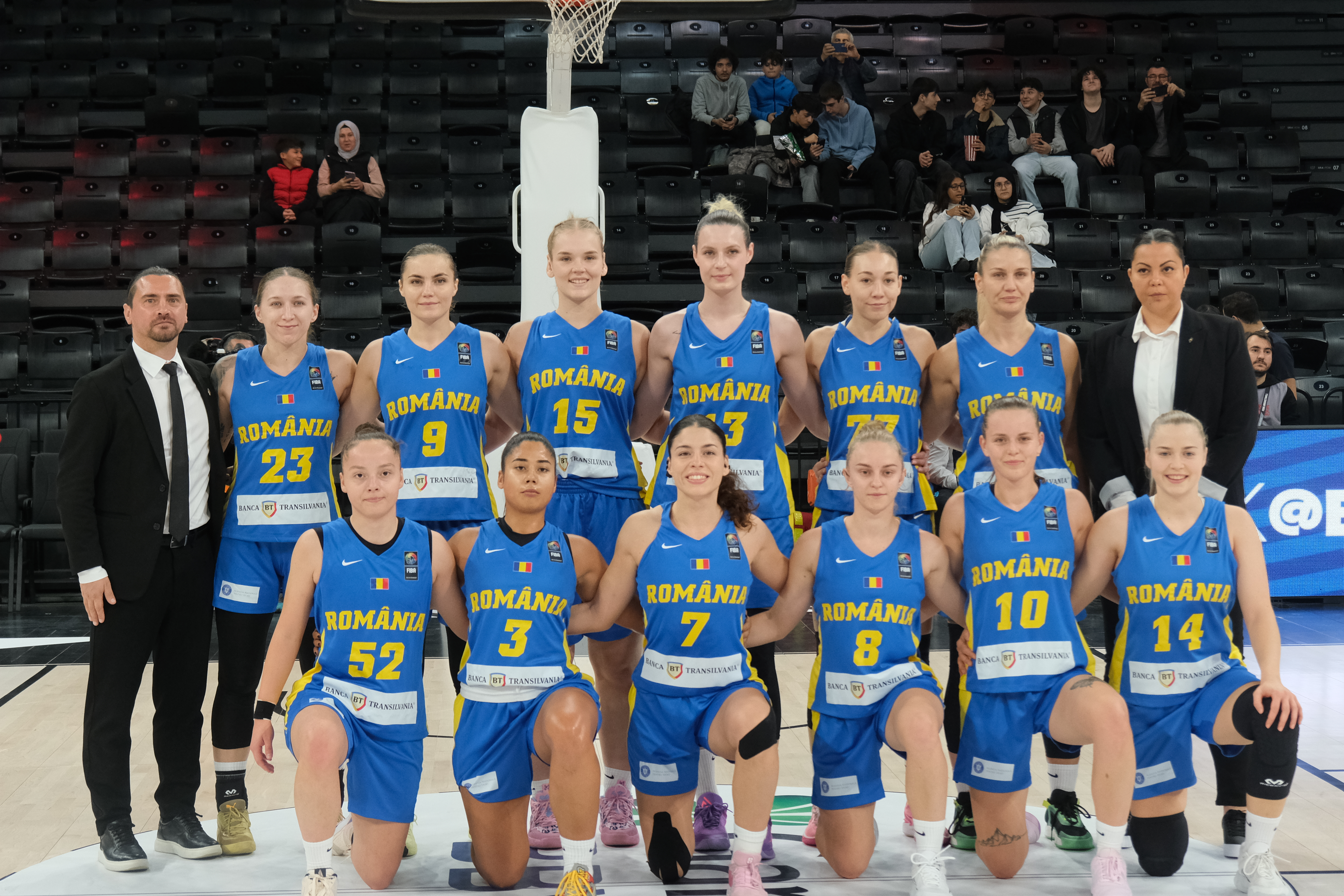
Romania team roster in November 2024

The Romania women's national basketball team is the national women's basketball team representing Romania. It is administered by the Romanian Basketball Federation.

== Current roster ==
Roster for the EuroBasket Women 2015.

- 4 (Romania) Claudia Pop
- 5 (Romania) Andreea Olah
- 6 (Romania) Sonia Ursu-Kim
- 7 (Romania) Annemarie Părău
- 8 (Romania) Gabriela Cursaru
- 9 (Romania) Elisabeth Pavel
- 11 (Romania) Gabriela Irimia
- 13 (Romania) Florina Pașcalău
- 14 (Romania) Alina Crăciun
- 21 (Romania) Adina Stoiedin
- 24 (Romania) Ancuţa Stoenescu
- 44 (Romania) Gabriela Mărginean

== Head coach position ==
- (Romania) Florin Nini 2014-15
- (Serbia) Miroslav Popovic 2016
- (Bosnia and Herzegovina) (Romania) Dragan Petričević 2017-2019
- (Turkey) Ayhan Avci 2019-present

== See also ==
- Sport in Romania
- Romania women's national under-19 basketball team
- Romania women's national under-17 basketball team
- Romania women's national 3x3 team
