= Israel women's national basketball team =

Women's national basketball team representing Israel

Israel
- FIBA ranking: 51 ▼3 (14 September 2026)
- Joined FIBA: 1939
- FIBA zone: FIBA Europe
- National federation: IBBA
- Coach: Shira Haelion

Olympic Games
- Appearances: None

World Cup
- Appearances: None

EuroBasket
- Appearances: 7
- Medals: None
Home	Away

The Israel women's national basketball team represents Israel in international women's basketball matches and is controlled by the Israel Basketball Association. Israel have hosted the FIBA Women's EuroBasket in 1991, and hosted again in 2023 along with Slovenia.

== European Championship record ==
Year	Position	GP	W	L
(Hungary) 1950	11th	8	1	7
1950–1989	Did not enter qualifier			
(Israel) 1991	8th	7	1	6
(Italy) 1993	Did not enter qualifier			
(Czech Republic) 1995	Did not qualify			
(Hungary) 1997	Did not qualify			
(Poland) 1999	Did not qualify			
(France) 2001	Did not qualify			
(Greece) 2003	12th	7	0	7
(Turkey) 2005	Did not qualify			
(Italy) 2007	13th	3	0	3
(Latvia) 2009	13th	3	0	3
(Poland) 2011	13th	3	0	3
(France) 2013	Did not qualify			
(Hungary) (Romania) 2015	Did not qualify			
(Czech Republic) 2017	Did not qualify			
(Latvia) (Serbia) 2019	Did not qualify			
(France) (Spain) 2021	Did not qualify			
(Israel) (Slovenia) 2023	16th	3	0	3
(Czech Republic) (Germany) (Italy) (Greece) 2025	Did not qualify			
(Belgium) (Finland) (Sweden) (Lithuania) 2027	To be determined			
Total		34	2	32

Note:Red border indicates host nation

1950 Women's EuroBasket

At the Eurobasket Women 1950, Israel competed for the first time, and finished in 11th place.

Preliminary round - Group B

Rank	Team	W	L	Pts	Diff
1	Hungary	3	0	6	+149
2	Poland	2	1	5	+32
3	Austria	1	2	4	−54
4	Israel	0	3	3	−127

May 14, 1950
20:15

Hungary 95, Israel 13
Scoring by half: 53–7, 42–6
Pts: Szabo-Nagyne (20)	Pts: Schwarz (4)

May 15, 1950
11:00

Israel 12, Austria 32
Scoring by half: 5–15, 7–17
Pts: Kaminer (16)	Pts: Lechner (10)

May 16, 1950
16:00

Poland 44, Israel 19
Scoring by half: 25–7, 19–12
Pts: Peters (12)	Pts: Kaminer (6)

7th to 12th Place

Rank	Team	W	L	Pts	Diff
1	Romania	5	0	10	+63
2	Belgium	4	1	9	+50
3	Switzerland	2	3	7	−2
4	Austria	2	3	7	−18
5	Israel	1	4	6	−51
6	Netherlands	1	4	6	−42

May 17, 1950
11:00

Switzerland 28, Israel 21
Scoring by half: 11–6, 17–15
Pts: Vuagniaux (9)	Pts: Nudel (6)

May 18, 1950
12:30

Romania 41, Israel 21
Scoring by half: 27–9, 14–12
Pts: Sadeanu (11)	Pts: Kaminer (7)

May 19, 1950
11:00

Israel 28, Belgium 50
Scoring by half: 11–22, 17–28
Pts: Kaminer (12)	Pts: Van Mol (18)

1991 Women's EuroBasket

At the Eurobasket Women 1991, Israel competed for the second time, the first time since 1950, and finished in 8th and last place. In addition to competing, Israel was the host of the competition.

Qualification - Group B

Pl	Team	Pld	W	L	PF	PA
1	Hungary	5	4	1	?	?
2	Israel	5	3	2	?	?
3	Netherlands	5	3	2	317	316
4	Spain	5	3	2	308	336
5	Denmark	5	1	4	?	?
6	Greece	5	0	5	?	?

9 May 1990

Israel 86, Spain 57

10 May 1990

Israel 80, Denmark 62

11 May 1990

Netherlands 60, Israel 57

12 May 1990

Hungary vs. Israel

13 May 1990

Israel 60, Greece 55

First Stage - Group A

After qualifying for the tournament, Israel entered the competition in Group A, and finished third.

Pl	Team	Pld	W	L	PF	PA
1	Hungary	3	2	1	211	217
2	Bulgaria	3	2	1	203	198
3	Israel	3	1	2	166	198
4	(Czech Republic) Czechoslovakia	3	1	2	247	226

12 June 1991

Israel 91, Czech Republic 90
Scoring by half: 50-43, 41-47
Pts: Draigor (33pts)	Pts: Dobrovicová (23pts)

13 June 1991

Israel 62, Hungary 72
Scoring by half: 32-45, 30-29
Pts: Mizrachi (13pts)	Pts: Balogh (33pts)

14 June 1991

Israel 56, Bulgaria 65
Scoring by half: 36-29, 20-36
Pts: Draigor (19pts)	Pts: Tzekova (15pts)

5th to 8th places

Israel was matched up against Poland in the 5th-8th place round, losing 80-69. In the 7th-8th place round, Israel lost to Italy 78-65.

16 June 1990
19:00

Poland 80, Israel 69
Scoring by half: 42-31, 38-38
Pts: Czerlonko (25pts)	Pts: Draigor (23pts)

7th place

17 June 1990
15:00

Italy 78, Israel 65
Scoring by half: 36-42, 42-23
Pts: Stanzani (18pts)	Pts: Goren (18pts)

1995 Women's EuroBasket qualifier

At the Eurobasket Women 1995 qualifier, Israel competed for the third time, and did not qualify.

Qualification - First stage - Group E

Team	Pld	W	L	PF	PA	PD	Pts
Ukraine	3	3	0	227	200	+27	6
Moldova	3	2	1	222	215	+7	5
Israel	3	1	2	212	231	−19	4
Turkey	3	0	3	218	233	−15	3

14 May 1993

Israel	64–77	Ukraine
Scoring by half: 20-38, 38-39

15 May 1993

Israel	64–73	Moldova
Scoring by half: 38-42, 26-31

16 May 1993

Turkey	81–84	Israel
Scoring by half: 36-43, 45-41

1997 Women's EuroBasket qualifier

At the Eurobasket Women 1997 qualifier, Israel competed in the qualifying round, and did not qualify.

Qualification - First stage - Group B

Pl	Team	Pld	W	L	PF	PA
1	Bulgaria	7	6	1	542	455
2	Israel	7	6	1	586	462
3	Greece	7	5	2	579	393
4	Belarus	7	5	2	628	508
5	Albania	7	4	4	524	567
6	Switzerland	7	2	5	475	615
7	(Republic of Ireland) Ireland	7	1	6	416	561
8	Austria	7	0	7	456	644

22 May 1995

Switzerland	70–89	Israel
Scoring by half: 28-45, 42-44

23 May 1995

Israel	84–73	Belarus
Scoring by half: 41-30, 43-43

24 May 1995

Austria	59–97	Israel
Scoring by half: 30-43, 29-54

25 May 1995

Israel	66–65	Greece
Scoring by half: 36-31, 30-34

26 May 1995

Albania	58–100	Israel
Scoring by half: 34-64, 24-36

27 May 1995

Israel	80–56	Ireland
Scoring by half: 49-30, 31-26

28 May 1995

Israel	70–81	Bulgaria
Scoring by half: 43-37, 27-44

Qualification - Second stage - Group C

Pl	Team	Pld	W	L	PF	PA
1	Spain	5	4	1	425	332
2	Germany	5	3	2	379	386
3	Moldova	5	3	2	354	382
4	Bulgaria	5	2	3	354	373
5	Croatia	5	2	3	372	362
6	Israel	5	1	4	345	394

22 May 1996
20:00

Israel	52–83	Spain
Scoring by half: 17-37, 35-46

23 May 1996
18:00

Moldova	85–82	Israel
Scoring by half: 42-33, 43-49

24 May 1996
16:00

Israel	70–87	Germany
Scoring by half: 37-46, 33-41

25 May 1996
16:00

Croatia	71–74	Israel
Scoring by half: 36-32, 35-42

26 May 1996
16:00

Israel	67–68	Bulgaria
Scoring by half: 39-32, 28-36

Roster
Number	Name	Position
	Sarit Arbel	F
	Shiri Dromi (Gold)	
	Tamar Palmon Maoz	G
	Nurit Rozenzweig	
	Inbal Tsiuonov	
4	Orly Kesten	
5	Rinat Levin	
6	Aluma Goren	G
7	Limor Mizrachi	G
8	Orly Grossman	
9	Iris Dinerman	
15	Victoria (Rudovski) Savin	

1999 Women's EuroBasket qualifier

During the EuroBasket Women 1999 tournament, Israel entered the qualifier round but failed to qualify for the main tournament.

Qualifier - Group D

Team	Pld	W	L	PF	PA	PD	Pts
Croatia	5	5	0	447	274	+173	10
Israel	5	3	2	370	331	+39	8
Netherlands	5	3	2	371	343	+28	8
Portugal	5	3	2	336	313	+23	8
Switzerland	5	1	4	277	406	−129	6
Ireland	5	0	5	249	383	−134	5

21 May 1997
20:45

Israel	82–69	Ireland
Scoring by half: 42-29, 37-40

22 May 1997
20:30

Switzerland	50–70	Israel
Scoring by half: 20-33, 30-37

23 May 1997
20:30

Netherlands	59–81	Israel
Scoring by half: 33-41, 26-40

Attendance: 150

24 May 1997
19:30

Israel	72–85	Croatia
Scoring by half: 33-35, 39-50

Attendance: 200

25 May 1997
16:00

Portugal	68–65	Israel
Scoring by half: 27-32, 41-33

Attendance: 650

Challenge round - Group B

Team	Pld	W	L	PF	PA	PD	Pts
Russia	5	5	0	390	285	+105	10
France	5	4	1	319	277	+42	9
Yugoslavia	5	2	3	348	346	+2	7
Hungary	5	2	3	318	327	−9	7
Romania	5	1	4	294	358	−64	6
Israel	5	1	4	296	372	−76	6

13 May 1998

Israel	45–70	Hungary
Scoring by half: 19-33, 26-37

14 May 1998

Israel	54–74	Romania
Scoring by half: 28-33, 26-41

15 May 1998

Israel	85–80 (OT)	Yugoslavia
Scoring by half: 46-43, 29-32 Overtime: 10-5

16 May 1998

Israel	43–62	France
Scoring by half: 16-24, 27-38

17 May 1998

Israel	69–86	Russia
Scoring by half: 31-49, 38-37

Roster
Number	Name	Position
	Tamar Palmon Maoz	G
	Ornit Shwartz	F
	Lili Wolf	
4	Sarit Arbel	F
5	Rinat Levin	
6	Aluma Goren	G
7	Limor Mizrachi	G
8	Orly Grossman	
9	Iris Dinerman	
11	Sharon Zeevi	F
14	Nurit Rozenzweig	
15	Victoria (Rudovski) Savin	

2001 Women's EuroBasket qualifier

During the EuroBasket Women 2001 tournament, Israel entered the qualifier round but failed to qualify for the main tournament.

Qualifier - Group C

Team	Pld	W	L	PF	PA	PD	Pts
Israel	5	5	0	380	259	+121	10
Finland	5	4	1	361	256	+105	9
Portugal	5	3	2	316	242	+74	8
Netherlands	5	2	3	304	303	+1	7
Switzerland	5	1	4	271	354	−83	6
Luxembourg	5	0	5	180	398	−218	5

20 May 1999
15:00

Israel	96–42	Switzerland
Scoring by half: 62-24, 34-18

Almere, Netherlands

21 May 1999
15:00

Finland	62–63	Israel
Scoring by half: 30-30, 32-33

Almere, Netherlands

22 May 1999
13:00

Israel	89–40	Luxembourg
Scoring by half: 46-20, 43-20

Almere, Netherlands

23 May 1999
13:00

Portugal	54–61	Israel
Scoring by half: 23-32, 31-29

Almere, Netherlands
Attendance: 50

24 May 1999
17:00

Israel	61–71	Israel
Scoring by half: 34-42, 26-29

Almere, Netherlands
Attendance: 255

Semifinals - Group A

Team	Pld	W	L	PF	PA	PD	Pts
Slovakia	6	6	0	466	333	+133	12
Greece	6	3	3	411	404	+7	9
Bosnia and Herzegovina	6	2	4	362	417	−55	8
Israel	6	1	5	371	456	−85	7

24 November 1999
18:30

Israel	62–51	Bosnia and Herzegovina
Scoring by half: 31-34, 31-17

Tel Aviv, Israel
Attendance: 3,000
Referees: Engin Kennerman (TUR), Pavel Volejnik (CZE)

27 November 1999
20:00

Greece	74–59	Israel
Scoring by half: 37-35, 37-24

Ptolemaida, Greece
Attendance: 800
Referees: Tihomir Bubalo (SRB), Borys Shulga (UKR)

1 December 1999
16:30

Slovakia	62–48	Israel
Scoring by half: 33-27, 29-21

Bratislava, Slovakia
Attendance: 2,000
Referees: Jakub Zamojski (POL), Istvàn Valovics (HUN)

22 November 2000
17:30

Bosnia and Herzegovina	87–68	Israel
Scoring by quarter: 17-16, 26-13, 18-16, 26-23

Tuzla, Bosnia and Herzegovina
Attendance: 4,000
Referees: Peter Poiger (AUT), György Varadi (HUN)

26 November 200
18:45

Israel	67–79	Greece
Scoring by quarter: 18-21, 12-24, 18-13, 19-21

Tel Aviv, Israel
Attendance: 3,500
Referees: Marco Giansanti (ITA), Borys Shulga (UKR)

29 November 2000
20:00

Israel	67–103	Slovakia
Scoring by quarter: 14-36, 24-26, 9-17, 20-24

Ramat Hasharon, Israel
Attendance: 300
Referees: Fabio Facchini (ITA), Bruno Gasperin (FRA)

Roster
Number	Name	Position
4	Orly Kesten	
5	Rinat Levin	
6	Shiri Dromi (Gold)	
7	Limor Mizrachi	G
8	Ornit Shwartz	F
9	Iris Dinerman	
10	Aluma Goren	G
11	Tali Noy	G
12	Tamar Palmon Maoz	G
13	Sharon Zeevi	F
14	Sarit Arbel	F
15	Victoria (Rudovski) Savin	

2003 Women's EuroBasket

During the EuroBasket Women 2003 tournament, Israel qualified for the third time and finished in 12th place after going 0-7.

Qualifier

16 May 2001

Israel 49, Slovenia 46
Scoring by half: 17-22, 32-24
Pts: Mizrachi (16pts)	Pts: Jokic (13pts)

18 May 2001

Israel 80, Cyprus 30
Scoring by half: 41-20, 39-10
Pts: Mizrachi (10pts)	Pts: Vezenkov (9pts)

19 May 2001

Israel 64, Croatia 67
Scoring by half: 24-31, 41-36
Pts: Goren (19pts)	Pts: Dapo (19pts)

20 May 2001

Switzerland 63, Israel 83
Scoring by half: 29-40, 34-43
Pts: Cleusix (15pts)	Pts: Shwartz (15pts)

Preliminary Round - Group A

Team	Pts.	Pld	W	L	PF	PA	Diff
1. Czech Republic	10	5	5	0	435	336	+99
2. France	8	5	3	2	386	346	+40
3. Poland	8	5	3	2	353	309	+44
4. Serbia and Montenegro	8	5	3	2	374	352	+22
5. Greece	6	5	1	4	321	362	-41
6. Israel	5	5	0	5	293	457	-164

19.09.2003
16:30

Israel 55, France 91
Scoring by half: 27-43, 28-48
Pts: Cohen (18pts)	Pts: Le Dréan (16pts)

20.09.2003
21:30

Czech Republic 104, Israel 67
Scoring by half: 53-39, 51-28
Pts: Blahuskova (21pts)	Pts: Mizrachi (23pts)

21.09.2003
19:00

Israel 59, Greece 78
Scoring by half: 26-49, 66-29
Pts: Mizrachi (25pts)	Pts: Kostaki (19pts)

23.09.2003
16:30

Poland 80, Israel 45
Scoring by half: 37-28, 43-17
Pts: Bibrzycka (18pts)	Pts: Zeevi (11pts)

24.09.2003
16:30

Serbia and Montenegro 104, Israel 67
Scoring by half: 49-36, 55-31
Pts: Mandic (22pts)	Pts: Mizrachi (19pts)

9th place bracket

Semi-finals
September 26, 2003 - Patras
Greece	76
Ukraine	68
September 26, 2003 - Patras
Hungary	85
Israel	77

Ninth place
September 27, 2003 - Patras
Greece	85
Hungary	83
Twelfth place
September 27, 2003 - Patras
Ukraine	107
Israel	87

26.09.2003
10:00

Hungary 85, Israel 77
Scoring by half: 45-36, 40-41
Pts: Cserny (30pts)	Pts: Mizrachi (21pts)

27.09.2003
10:00

Ukraine 107, Israel 87
Scoring by half: 54-44, 53-43
Pts: Alyoshkina (32pts)	Pts: Shwartz (23pts)

Standings

Place	Team	W-L
1	Russia	6–2
2	Czech Republic	7–1
3	Spain	7–1
4	Poland	4–4
5	France	5–3
6	Belgium	3–5
7	Slovakia	4–4
8	Serbia and Montenegro	3–5
9	Greece	3–4
10	Hungary	2–5
11	Ukraine	1–6
12	Israel	0–7

2005 Women's EuroBasket

During the EuroBasket Women 2005 tournament, Israel entered the qualifier round but failed to qualify for the main tournament.

Qualifier - Division A - Group C

Team	Pld	W	L	PF	PA	PD	Pts
Germany	6	5	1	481	369	+112	11
Romania	6	5	1	382	368	+14	11
Belgium	6	2	4	435	435	0	8
Israel	6	0	6	342	468	−126	6

7 September 2004
19:10

Israel	73–78	Belgium
Scoring by quarter: 15-20, 18-24, 28-14, 12-20

Tel Aviv, Israel
Attendance: 300
Referees: Maria Argirou (GRE), Vladimir Tsekov (BUL)

12 September 2004
15:00

Germany	95–50	Israel
Scoring by quarter: 28-11, 23-9, 16-15, 28-15

Dorsten, Germany
Attendance: 1,200
Referees: Chantal Julien (FRA), Oscar Lefwerth (SWE)

15 September 2004
17:00

Romania	72–63	Israel
Scoring by quarter: 16-16, 23-17, 15-17, 18-13

Cluj Napoca, Romania
Attendance: 1,000
Referees: Vladimir Okhrimenko (RUS), Maja Vukanovic (SRB)

18 September 2004
16:15

Belgium	75–52	Israel
Scoring by quarter: 18-14, 14-9, 25-11, 18-18

Charleroi, Belgium
Attendance: 250
Referees: Philippe Leemann (SUI), Paul Den Hartog (NED)

23 September 2004
11:00

Israel	52–88	Germany
Scoring by quarter: 11-10, 16-26, 17-26, 8-26

Tel Aviv, Israel
Attendance: 250
Referees: Marin Mehandjiev (BUL), Emin Mogulkoc (TUR)

25 September 2004
21:15

Israel	52–60	Romania
Scoring by quarter: 13-14, 10-10, 12-18, 17-18

Tel Aviv, Israel
Attendance: 350
Referees: Mehmet Keseratar (TUR), Christos Christodoulou (GRE)

Additional qualifier - Group C

Team	Pld	W	L	PF	PA	PD	Pts
Ukraine	6	5	1	493	392	+101	11
Croatia	6	3	3	449	475	−26	9
Israel	6	2	4	421	443	−22	8
Bulgaria	6	2	4	416	469	−53	8

7 August 2005
20:00

Croatia	74–66	Israel
Scoring by quarter: 15-22, 22-17, 17-18, 20-9

Daruvar, Croatia
Attendance: 350
Referees: Petr Sudek (SVK), Dragan Kralj (BIH)

10 August 2005
20:00

Israel	69–67	Ukraine
Scoring by quarter: 17-13, 24-20, 10-15, 18-19

Ramat Gan, Israel
Attendance: 300
Referees: Antonis Demetriou (CYP)

13 August 2005
18:00

Bulgaria	74–70	Israel
Scoring by quarter: 23-15, 17-16, 19-24, 15-15

Pravets, Bulgaria
Attendance: 400
Referees: Mehmet Keseratar (TUR), Marjan Micevski (MKD)

16 August 2005
20:00

Israel	75–76	Croatia
Scoring by quarter: 19-21, 12-23, 22-11, 22-21

Ramat Gan, Israel
Attendance: 300
Referees: Leonidas Spiridonos (GRE), Emin Mogulkoc (TUR)

19 August 2005
18:00

Ukraine	81–66	Israel
Scoring by quarter: 27-19, 11-21, 16-12, 27-14

Kyiv, Ukraine
Referees: Grzegorz Bachanski (POL), Igor Demenkov (RUS)

21 August 2005
20:00

Israel	75–71	Bulgaria
Scoring by quarter: 16-13, 29-21, 12-17, 18-20

Ramat Gan, Israel
Attendance: 400
Referees: Konstantinos Koromilas (GRE), Ismail Özgün (TUR)

Roster
Number	Name	Position
	Ekaterina Abramzon	SF
	Shachar Alterman	SF
	Shay Doron	G
	Shimrit Gigi	F
	Victoria Khashibon	C
	Bat El Lazmi	PG
	Katia Levitsky	PF
	Tali Noy	G
	Inbar Oriyon	PF
	Laine Selwyn	PG
4	Rivi Grinboym	GF
5	Meirav Dori	SF
6	Chen Nusel	SG
7	Liron Cohen	PG
8	Ornit Shwartz	F
9	Michal Epstein	PF
10	Shiri Sharon	G
11	Tal Hila Zalz	F
12	Tamar Palmon Maoz	G
13	Sharon Zeevi	F
14	Sarit Arbel	F
15	Shiran Zairy	PG

Coach
Eliyahu Rabi

2007 Women's EuroBasket

During the EuroBasket Women 2007 tournament, Israel qualified for the fourth time and finished in 13th place.

In addition to competing in the tournament, Israel referee Seffi Shemmesh worked the qualifying round Group F game Serbia vs Italy, and Spain vs Russia. She also worked the classification round game France vs Lithuania.

Preliminary round - Group A

Team	Pts.	W	L	PCT	PF	PA	Diff
Czech Republic	6	3	0	1.000	231	149	+82
Latvia	5	2	1	0.667	194	205	−11
Turkey	4	1	2	0.333	194	217	−23
Israel	3	0	3	0.000	174	222	−48

September 24
21:00

Israel	43–75	Czech Republic
Scoring by quarter: 11–17, 13–18, 7–19, 12–21
Pts: Cohen (16pts)		Pts: Vitecková (16pts)

Vasto
Attendance: 500
Referees: Guerrino Cerebuch(ITA), Aleksander Gorshkov(RUS), Ademir Zurapovic (BIH)

September 25
18:30

Latvia	77–73	Israel
Scoring by quarter: 17–12, 13–27, 23–18, 24–16
Pts: Jekabsone-Zogota (28pts)		Pts: Suez Karni (21pts)

Vasto
Attendance: 600
Referees: Chantal Julien(FRA), Aleksander Gorshkov(RUS), Jasmina Tatic (SRB)

September 26
18:30

Israel	58–70	Turkey
Scoring by quarter: 18–17, 23–26, 4–18, 13–9
Pts: Doron (12pts)		Pts: Horasan (13pts)

Vasto
Attendance: 600
Referees: Guerrino Cerebuch(ITA), Chantal Julien(FRA), Ademir Zurapovic (BIH)

2009 Women's EuroBasket

During the EuroBasket Women 2009 tournament, Israel qualified for the fifth time and finished in 13th place.

In addition to competing in the tournament, Israeli referee Seffi Shemmesh worked the following games:

- Preliminary round - Group A - Spain vs Ukraine
- Preliminary round - Group B - Latvia vs Poland
- Preliminary round - Group B - Greece vs Latvia
- Qualifying round - Group F - Belarus vs Russia
- Qualifying round - Group F - Turkey vs France
- Quarterfinals - Slovakia vs Belarus
- Finals - Russia vs France

Qualifying round - Group A

Team	Pts	W	L	PF	PA	Diff
Israel	14	6	2	604	537	+67
Lithuania	14	6	2	551	498	+53
Ukraine	13	5	3	580	527	+53
Germany	10	2	6	472	580	−108
Great Britain	9	1	7	540	605	−65

Preliminary round - Group D

Team	Pld	W	L	PF	PA	PD	Pts
France	3	3	0	212	192	+20	6
Italy	3	2	1	203	198	+5	5
Belarus	3	1	2	200	206	−6	4
Israel	3	0	3	201	229	−19	3

June 7
15:45

Report

Belarus	81–76	Israel
Scoring by quarter: 17–21, 13–17, 22–10, 29–28
Pts: Troina 16; Rebs: Leuchanka 7 Asts: Marchanka 4		Pts: Doron 26; Rebs: Levitsky 12; Asts: Cohen, Selwyn 4

Vidzemes Olimpiskais Centrs, Valmiera
Attendance: 430
Referees: Grzegorz Bachanski (POL), Antonio Conde (ESP), Jaroslav Janac (SVK)

June 8
15:45

Report

Israel	64–75	Italy
Scoring by quarter: 10–32, 16–14, 19–13, 19–16
Pts: Suez-Karni 18; Rebs: Levitsky 6 Asts: Cohen 6		Pts: Masciadri 23; Rebs: Alexander 10; Asts: Cirone, Ballardini 4

Vidzemes Olimpiskais Centrs, Valmiera
Attendance: 600
Referees: Juris Kokainis (LAT), Oliver Krause (GER), Maria Argirou (GRE)

June 9
18:00

Report

France	73–70	Israel
Scoring by quarter: 17–19, 19–20, 16–13, 21–18
Pts: Sandrine Gruda, Emilie Gomis 11; Rebs: Elodie Godin 8 Asts: 3 players 3		Pts: Cohen 30; Rebs: Levitsky 5 Asts: 3 players 3

Vidzemes Olimpiskais Centrs, Valmiera
Attendance: 1,000
Referees: Vicente Bulto (ESP), Grzegorz Bachanski (POL), Vaclav Lukes (CZE)

Israel Women's National Basketball Team roster
Players
Coaches

Pos.	No.	Name	Age – Date of birth	Height	Club
SF	4	Liad Suez-Karni	28 – 21 April 1981	1.87 m (6 ft 2 in)	Electra Ramat HaSharon	(Israel)
SF	5	Meirav Dori	23 – 25 May 1986	1.78 m (5 ft 10 in)	Electra Ramat HaSharon	(Israel)
F	6	Shimrit Gigi	29 – 9 February 1980	1.80 m (5 ft 11 in)	Bnot Hasharon	(Israel)
G	7	Liron Cohen	26 – 5 August 1982	1.73 m (5 ft 8 in)	TS Wisła Can-Pack Kraków	(Poland)
G	8	Shay Doron	24 – 1 April 1985	1.75 m (5 ft 9 in)	Maccabi Ramat Hen	(Israel)
PG	9	Shiran Zairy	23 – 18 January 1986	1.66 m (5 ft 5 in)	Maccabi Bnot Ashdod	(Israel)
G	10	Laine Selwyn	28 – 16 May 1981	1.70 m (5 ft 7 in)	Electra Ramat HaSharon	(Israel)
PG	11	Nomi Kolodny	27 – 15 March 1982	1.71 m (5 ft 7 in)	Maccabi Bnot Ashdod	(Israel)
F	12	Michal Epstein	28 – 5 March 1981	1.80 m (5 ft 11 in)	Maccabi Ramat Hen	(Israel)
F	13	Ekaterina Abramzon	21 – 1 July 1987	1.85 m (6 ft 1 in)	Bnot Hasharon	(Israel)
F	14	Katia Levitsky	23 – 2 November 1985	1.88 m (6 ft 2 in)	Maccabi Bnot Ashdod	(Israel)
C	15	Jennifer Fleischer	25 – 17 February 1984	1.95 m (6 ft 5 in)	Maccabi Bnot Ashdod	(Israel)

Head coach

- (Israel) Eli Rabi

Legend

- (C) Team captain
- nat field describes country
  of last club
  before the tournament

2011 Women's EuroBasket

During the EuroBasket Women 2011 tournament, Israel qualified for the sixth time and finished in 13th place.

In addition to Israel competing in the tournament, Israeli referee Yaari Rainisch worked the following games:

- Preliminary round - Group C - Germany vs Poland
- Preliminary round - Group D - France vs Croatia
- Preliminary round - Group D - Greece vs France
- Main round - Group F - Montenegro vs France
- Main round - Group F - France vs Poland
- Classification round - Croatia vs Latvia
- Seventh place game - Latvia vs Lithuania

Qualifying round - Group B

Team	Pts	W	L	PF	PA	Diff
Israel	10	4	2	476	435	+41
Latvia	10	4	2	451	400	+51
Serbia	10	4	2	437	439	−2
Romania	6	0	6	403	493	−90

12 August 2010
17:45

Report

Israel	93–65	Serbia
Scoring by quarter: 26–13, 15–12, 25–20, 27–20
Pts: Cohen 26; Rebs: Selwyn 9 Asts: Cohen 7		Pts: Matić 17; Rebs: Matić 9 Asts: Milovanović 6

Zismann Sport Hall, Ramat Gan
Attendance: 700
Referees: Milan Brziak, Christos Christodoulou, Marius Ciulin

17 August 2010
20:30

Report

Latvia	66–71	Israel
Scoring by quarter: 14–18, 17–19, 16–19, 19–15
Pts: Basko 19; Rebs: Tamane 8 Asts: Basko 4		Pts: Doron 22; Rebs: Selwyn 6 Asts: Cohen 5

Arena Riga, Riga
Attendance: 2,500
Referees: Sergiy Zashchuk, Marc Hesters, Gintaras Vitkauskas

20 August 2010
17:30

Report

Romania	79–83	Israel
Scoring by quarter: 29–20, 18–16, 14–26, 18–21
Pts: Marginean 30; Rebs: Marginean 7 Asts: Ciocan 6		Pts: Doron 27; Rebs: Cohen 5 Asts: Cohen 8

Sala Sporturilor, Targoviste
Attendance: 500
Referees: Petros Christophides, Elena Chernova, Damir Javor

23 August 2010
20:30

Report

Serbia	70–68	Israel
Scoring by quarter: 17–17, 22–22, 12–14, 19–15
Pts: Pešović 16; Rebs: Maksimović 8 Asts: Dabović 4		Pts: Cohen 19; Rebs: three players 4 Asts: Cohe 4

Sportski Centar Ruma, Ruma
Attendance: 4,700
Referees: Maria Argirou, Vladimir Tsekov, Jelena Tomic

26 August 2010
17:30

Report

Israel	82–83 (OT)	Latvia
Scoring by quarter: 13–18, 17–15, 19–12, 10–14, Overtime: 8–8, 15–16
Pts: Cohen 24; Rebs: Fleischer 10; Asts: Cohen 13		Pts: Kublina 20; Rebs: Tamane 15; Asts: Karklina 5

Zismann Sport Hall, Ramat Gan
Attendance: 1,000
Referees: Marin Mehandjiev, Antonis Demetriou, Aytug Ekti

29 August 2010
17:45

Report

Israel	79–72	Romania
Scoring by quarter: 27–20, 17–18, 16–17, 19–17
Pts: Cohen 27; Rebs: Levitsky 6 Asts: Selwyn 7		Pts: Marginean 16; Rebs: Pascalau 9 Asts: Mandache 5

Zismann Sport Hall, Ramat Gan
Attendance: 1,100
Referees: Nikolaos Papadimitriou, Dimitar Gologanov, Anton Makhlin

Preliminary round - Group B

Team	Pld	W	L	PF	PA	PD	Pts
Czech Republic	3	3	0	199	163	+36	6
Belarus	3	2	1	185	148	+37	5
Great Britain	3	1	2	159	166	−7	4
Israel	3	0	3	148	214	−66	3

18 June 2011
20:30

Report

Czech Republic	72–56	Israel
Scoring by quarter: 19–12, 13–10, 20–17, 20–17
Pts: Vitecková 14; Rebs: Veselá 10; Asts: Elhotova 5		Pts: Doron 16; Rebs: three players 4 Asts: Shafir 3

Łuczniczka, Bydgoszcz
Referees: Paolo Taurino (ITA), Ingus Baumanis (LAT), Carole Delauné (FRA)

19 June 2011
15:00

Report

Israel	41–68	Belarus
Scoring by quarter: 12–18, 6–8, 18–21, 5–21
Pts: Cohen 12; Rebs: Levitsky 6 Asts: Cohen, Doron 2		Pts: Likhtarovich 13; Rebs: Kress 13; Asts: Leuchanka, Marchanka 4

Łuczniczka, Bydgoszcz
Referees: Grzegorz Ziemblicki (POL), Panagiotis Anastopoulos (GRE), Igor Dragojevic (MNE)

20 June 2011
15:00

Report

Great Britain	72–51	Israel
Scoring by quarter: 13–11, 24–13, 17–13, 20–14
Pts: Leedham 18; Rebs: Page 9 Asts: Stafford, Page 5		Pts: Doron 15; Rebs: three players 4 Asts: Doron 3

Łuczniczka, Bydgoszcz
Referees: Paolo Taurino (ITA), Moritz Reiter (GER), Haris Bijedic (BIH)

Israel Women's National Basketball Team roster
Players
Coaches

Pos.	No.	Name	Age – Date of birth	Height	Club
PF	4	Liad Suez Karni	30 – 21 April 1981	1.87 m (6 ft 2 in)	Barak Netanya	(Israel)
SG	5	Meirav Dori	25 – 25 May 1986	1.78 m (5 ft 10 in)	Electra Ramat HaSharon	(Israel)
G	6	Noa Ganor	25 – 6 April 1986	1.72 m (5 ft 8 in)	Electra Ramat	(Israel)
G	7	Liron Cohen	28 – 5 August 1982	1.73 m (5 ft 8 in)	Beretta Famila Schio	(Italy)
G	8	Shay Doron	26 – 1 April 1985	1.75 m (5 ft 9 in)	Elitzur Ramla (women's basketball)	(Israel)
PG	9	Shiran Zairy	25 – 18 January 1986	1.66 m (5 ft 5 in)	Elitzur Ramla (women's basketball)	(Israel)
PG	10	Laine Selwyn	30 – 16 May 1981	1.72 m (5 ft 8 in)	Elitzur Ramla (women's basketball)	(Israel)
F	12	Michal Epstein	30 – 5 March 1981	1.80 m (5 ft 11 in)	Hapoel Ramat Gan	(Israel)
F	13	Ekaterina Abramzon	23 – 1 July 1987	1.85 m (6 ft 1 in)	Electra Ramat HaSharon	(Israel)
PF	14	Katia Levitsky	25 – 2 November 1985	1.90 m (6 ft 3 in)	Maccabi Ashdod B.C.	(Israel)
C	15	Jennifer Fleischer	27 – 17 February 1984	1.93 m (6 ft 4 in)	Challes-les-Eaux Savoie	(France)
PG	21	Naama Shafir	21 – 28 February 1990	1.70 m (5 ft 7 in)	University of Toledo	(United States)

Head coach

- (Israel) Eli Rabi

Legend

- (C) Team captain
- Club – describes last
  club before the tournament
- Age – describes age on June 18, 2011

2013 Women's EuroBasket qualifier

During the EuroBasket Women 2013 tournament, Israel entered the qualifier round but failed to qualify for the main tournament.

Qualifier - Group A

Team	G	W	L	PF	PA	Diff	Pts
Belarus	8	6	2	505	435	+70	14
Ukraine	8	5	3	538	483	+55	13
Hungary	8	5	3	538	471	+67	13
Israel	8	4	4	494	500	−6	12
Portugal	8	0	8	379	565	−186	8

16 June 2012
21:00

Israel	73–58	Ukraine
Scoring by quarter: 17-10, 18-18, 14-14, 24-16

Rishon Le Zion, Israel
Attendance: 1,000
Referees: Spyridon Gontas (GRE), Marko Juras (SRB), Christof Madinger (GER)

20 June 2012
19:30

Belarus	69–61	Israel
Scoring by quarter: 19-18, 15-15, 20-14, 15-14

Minsk, Belarus
Attendance: 1,900
Referees: Elena Chernova (RUS), Maja Vukanovic (SRB), Karolina Andersson (FIN)

23 June 2012
21:00

Israel	49–64	Hungary
Scoring by quarter: 9-19, 5-19, 17-16, 15-10

Rishon Le Zion, Israel
Attendance: 1,600
Referees: Ioannis Foufis (GRE), Sasa Maricic (SRB), Evgeny Vetrov (RUS)

27 June 2012
20:30

Portugal	60–62	Israel
Scoring by quarter: 14-19, 13-11, 14-20, 19-12

Casal de Cambra, Portugal
Attendance: 50
Referees: Paolo Taurino (ITA), Carlos Cortes (ESP), Bernard Vassallo (MLT)

4 July 2012
18:00

Ukraine	71–68	Israel
Scoring by quarter: 22-19, 15-24, 13-15, 21-10

Yuzhne, Ukraine
Attendance: 630
Referees: Jasmina Juras (SRB), Anna Cardus (ESP), Fabiana Martinescu (ROU)

7 July 2012
21:00

Israel	60–58	Belgium
Scoring by quarter: 16-11, 17-25, 12-14, 15-8

Rishon Le Zion, Israel
Attendance: 1,600
Referees: Panagiotis Anastopoulos (GRE), Antonis Demetriou (CYP), Miodrag Licina (SRB)

11 July 2012
21:00

Hungary	73–66	Israel
Scoring by quarter: 14-20, 16-14, 20-18, 23-14

Sopron, Hungary
Attendance: 1,400
Referees: Marko Juras (SRB), Alexandru Olaru (ROU), Özlem Yalman (TUR)

14 July 2012
21:00

Israel	58–47	Portugal
Scoring by quarter: 14-12, 16-16, 18-7, 10-12

Rishon Le Zion, Israel
Attendance: 1,400
Referees: Sasa Maricic (SRB), Nikolaos Somos (GRE), Oscar Perea (ESP)

Roster
Number	Name	Position
4	Katia Levitsky	PF
5	Noa Ganor	SG
6	Ekaterina Abramzon	SF
7	Liron Cohen	PG
8	Shay Doron	G
9	Shiran Zairy	PG
10	Brahsheedah Elohim	G
11	Nomi Kolodny	PG
12	Ortal Oren	PG
13	Shira Shecht	F
14	Shani Levy	SF
15	Jennifer Fleischer	C

Head coach
Eliyahu Rabi

| asst_coach = Source:

2015 Women's EuroBasket qualifier

During the EuroBasket Women 2015 tournament, Israel entered the qualifier round but failed to qualify for the main tournament.

In addition to competing, Israeli referee David Romano work the first leg, of the first round, finals match, between Greece and Poland.

Qualifier - First round - Group D

Israel, in addition to participating in the tournament, was also the host nation of the qualifier, with all game were played in Ramla.

Team	Pld	W	L	PF	PA	PD	Pts
Israel	3	3	0	199	169	+30	6
Germany	3	2	1	210	210	0	5
North Macedonia	3	1	2	199	215	−16	4
Portugal	3	0	3	171	185	−14	3

7 June 2013
15:00

Boxscore

Israel	68–57	Germany
Scoring by quarter: 15–17, 15–11, 22–15, 16–14
Pts: Doron 19; Rebs: Fleischer 10; Asts: Doron 7		Pts: three players 9 Rebs: Fikiel 12; Asts: Mersch 5

Kiriat Menahem Arena, Ramla
Attendance: 1,000
Referees: Georgios Tanatzis (GRE), Piotr Pastusiak (POL), Maka Kupatadze (GEO)

8 June 2013
20:45

Boxscore

North Macedonia	56–72	Israel
Scoring by quarter: 19–14, 12–26, 14–15, 11–17
Pts: Givens 25; Rebs: Givens 11; Asts: Givens 5		Pts: Fleischer 17; Rebs: Fleischer 17; Asts: Cohen 7

Kiriat Menahem Arena, Ramla
Attendance: 500
Referees: Maka Kupatadze (GEO), Antonis Demetriou (CYP), Semen Ovinov (RUS)

9 June 2013
18:00

Boxscore

Portugal	56–59	Israel
Scoring by quarter: 12–16, 15–13, 12–18, 17–12
Pts: Correia 16; Rebs: Nascimento 10; Asts: Faustino 4		Pts: Epstein 14; Rebs: Abramzon 10; Asts: Cohen 10

Kiriat Menahem Arena, Ramla
Attendance: 500
Referees: Georgios Tanatzis (GRE), Maka Kupatadze (GEO), Semen Ovinov (RUS)

Knockout stage

Semifinals
1	Poland	44	65	109
4	Bulgaria	59	44	103
2	Israel	57	57	114
3	Greece	69	66	135

Final
1	Poland	46	57	103
3	Greece	61	56	117

15 June 2013
18:30

Boxscore

Greece	69–57	Israel
Scoring by quarter: 21–15, 22–12, 14–17, 12–13
Pts: Spanou 21; Rebs: Spanou 14; Asts: Lymoura 5		Pts: Epstein 19; Rebs: Epstein, Levitsky 5 Asts: Doron, Cohen 3

Athens
Attendance: 500
Referees: Marco Giansanti (ITA), Haris Bijedic (BIH), Milan Brziak (SVK)

18 June 2013
20:00

Boxscore

Israel	57–66	Greece
Scoring by quarter: 14–15, 15–18, 11–15, 17–18
Pts: Epstein 11; Rebs: Levitsky 10; Asts: Doron 5		Pts: Chatzinikolaou 12; Rebs: Papamichail 9 Asts: four players 3

Kiriat Menahem Arena, Ramla
Attendance: 800
Referees: Sreten Radovic (CRO), Milos Koljensic (MNE), Vladyslav Isachenko (UKR)

Qualifier - Second round - Group F

During the first game of the round, Israel held an eight-point lead with eight minutes to go in the game, but ultimately fell to Croatia 76-73. During their first game against Bulgaria, Israel original trailed by eight before coming back to hold on to a 71-68 victory. During the third game of the tournament, Israel again lost to Croatia, by the score of 83-56. Israel, during their fourth game lost to Bulgaria and was officially eliminated from the tournament.

Team	Pld	W	L	PF	PA	PD	Pts
Croatia	4	4	0	306	245	+61	8
Bulgaria	4	1	3	259	288	−29	5
Israel	4	1	3	270	302	−32	5

11 June 2014
19:00

Boxscore

Croatia	76–73	Israel
Scoring by quarter: 23–20, 14–19, 18–18, 21–16
Pts: Ivezić 18; Rebs: Lelas 6 Asts: Ivezić, Mišura 5		Pts: Cohen 20; Rebs: Epstein, Fleischer 3 Asts: Cohen 6

Sportska dvorana Vijuš, Slavonski Brod
Attendance: 200
Referees: Paolo Taurino (ITA), Bernard Vassallo (MLT), Peter Papp (HUN)

15 June 2014
19:05

Boxscore

Israel	71–68	Bulgaria
Scoring by quarter: 14–22, 22–11, 17–13, 18–22
Pts: Doron 20; Rebs: Shafir 6 Asts: Cohen 5		Pts: Dimitrova 22; Rebs: Miteva 9 Asts: Peteva 6

Shalom Zisman Municipal Sports Arena, Ramat Gan
Attendance: 1,000
Referees: Sergiy Chebyshev (UKR), Alexander Romanov (RUS), Gavin Williams (WAL)

22 June 2014
19:05

Boxscore

Israel	56–83	Croatia
Scoring by quarter: 18–26, 20–14, 14–23, 4–20
Pts: Shafir 14; Rebs: Epstein 4 Asts: five players 2		Pts: Ivanković 17; Rebs: Mazić 9 Asts: Mišura 6

Shalom Zisman Municipal Sports Arena, Ramat Gan
Attendance: 1,000
Referees: Christos Christodoulou (GRE), Konstantin Simonow (GER), Alexey Davydov (RUS)

25 June 2014
17:30

Boxscore

Bulgaria	75–70	Israel
Scoring by quarter: 17–18, 16–10, 23–24, 19–18
Pts: Tomova 20; Rebs: Miteva 9 Asts: Hodges 5		Pts: Doron 23; Rebs: Levitsky 7 Asts: Cohen 10

Arena Samokov, Samokov
Attendance: 500
Referees: Emin Moğulkoç (TUR), Alija Ferevski (MKD), Alin Faur (ROU)

== Current roster ==
Roster for the EuroBasket Women 2027 qualification.

Israël women's national basketball team roster
Players
Coaches

Pos.	No.	Name	Age – Date of birth	Height	Club	Ctr.
G	1	Alyssa Baron	33 – 16 April 1992	1.76 m (5 ft 9 in)	Elitzur Holon	(Israel)
G	4	Eden Rotberg (C)	27 – 1 July 1998	1.70 m (5 ft 7 in)	Elitzur Ramla	(Israel)
G	5	Alice Hatukai	22 – 27 January 2003	1.63 m (5 ft 4 in)	Maccabi Ironi Ramat Gan	(Israel)
C	6	Dorian Dahan Sujić	21 – 14 June 2004	1.86 m (6 ft 1 in)	ŽKK Crvena zvezda	(Serbia)
G	7	Gili Eisner	24 – 6 August 2001	1.76 m (5 ft 9 in)	Maccabi Ironi Ramat Gan	(Israel)
G	8	Shir Tirush	26 – 2 June 1999	1.70 m (5 ft 7 in)	Maccabi Ironi Ramat Gan	(Israel)
G	10	Abby Meyers	26 – 14 July 1999	1.83 m (6 ft 0 in)	CB Avenida	(Spain)
F	12	Lior Garzon	23 – 16 December 2001	1.83 m (6 ft 0 in)	Elitzur Ramla	(Israel)
F	13	Eden Zipel	22 – 27 December 2002	1.83 m (6 ft 0 in)	Hapoel Rishon LeZion	(Israel)
G	15	Dor Sahar	26 – 5 August 1999	1.64 m (5 ft 5 in)	Maccabi Bnot Ashdod	(Israel)
F	24	Daniel Raber	29 – 5 September 1996	1.83 m (6 ft 0 in)	Olympiacos women's basketball	(Greece)
F	55	Tslil Vaturi	27 – 21 June 1998	1.74 m (5 ft 9 in)	Elitzur Holon	(Israel)
G		Ayala Oren	19 – 29 March 2006	1.67 m (5 ft 6 in)	Elitzur Holon	(Israel)
G		Maayan Cohen	19 – 27 February 2006	1.66 m (5 ft 5 in)	Elitzur Holon	(Israel)
G		Noor Kiyof	24 – 24 August 2001	1.68 m (5 ft 6 in)	Maccabi Haifa	(Israel)
F		Noa Maged	18 – 23 April 2007	1.85 m (6 ft 1 in)	Hapoel Lev Jerusalem	(Israel)
C		Tamar Cohen	20 – 17 March 2005	1.86 m (6 ft 1 in)	Hapoel Beer Sheva Dimona	(Israel)

Head coach

- (Israel) Shira Helyon

Assistant coach(es)

- (Israel) Limor Peleg

Legend

- (C) Team captain
- Club – describes last
  club before the tournament
- Age – describes age
  on 28 October 2025

Roster

== Former head coaches ==
- (Israel) Sharon Drucker
- (Israel) Eli Rabi
- (Israel) Marik Zeltzer
- (Israel) Moshe Weinkrantz
- (Israel) Arik Shivek
- (Israel) Effi Birnbaum

== See also ==
- Israel women's national under-19 basketball team
- Israel women's national under-17 basketball team
- Israel women's national 3x3 team
- Sports in Israel
