= Limor Mizrachi =

Israeli basketball player

Limor Mizrachi לימור מזרחי
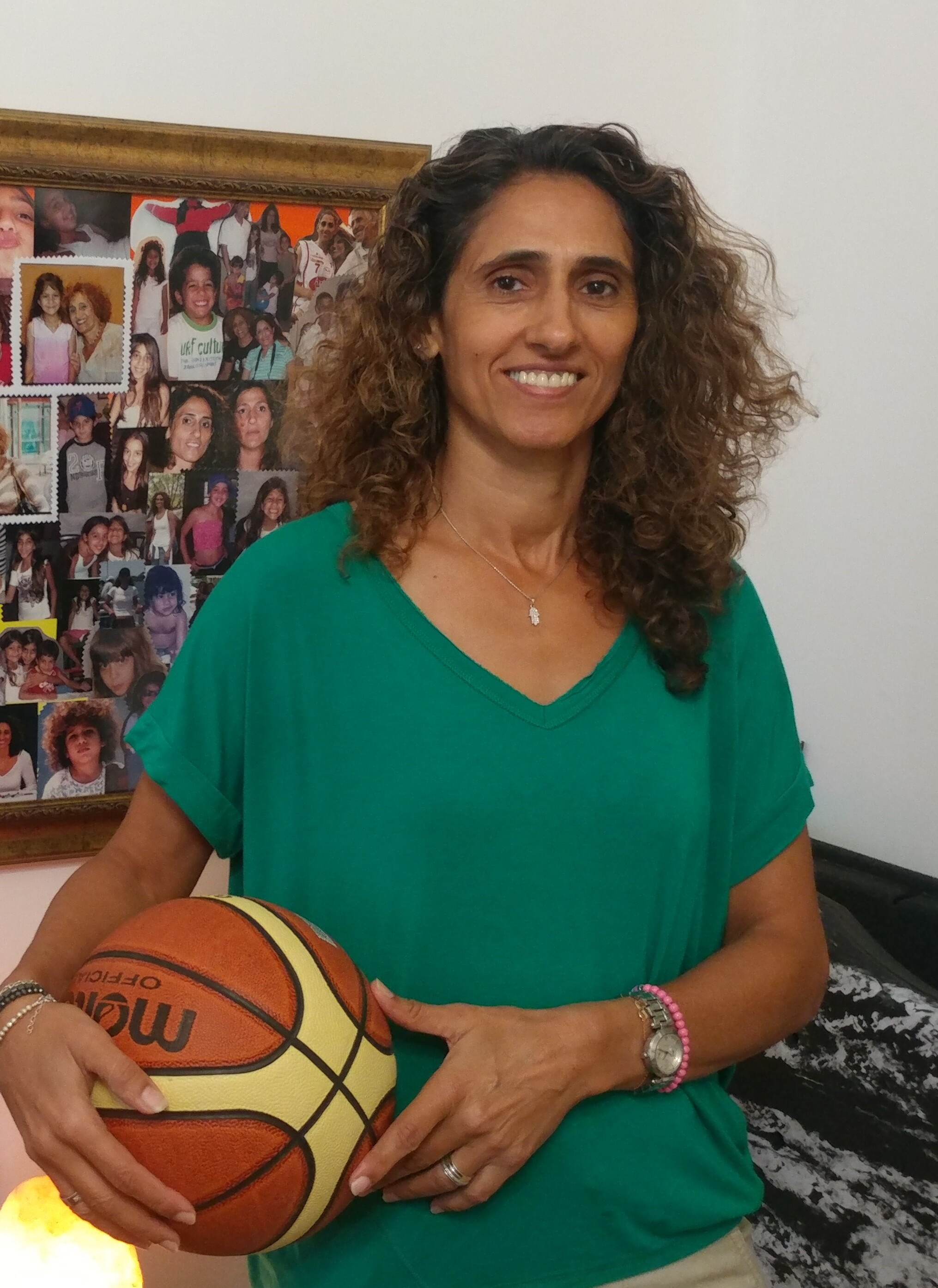

Personal information
- Born: June 24, 1970 (age 56) Givatayim, Israel
- Listed height: 170 cm (5 ft 7 in)
- Listed weight: 59 kg (130 lb)

Career information
- College: Maryland; 1991–1992
- Position: Guard
- Number: 7, 14

Career history

Playing
- 1992–1994: Elitzur Holon
- 1994–1995: Lachen Ramat Hasharon
- 1996–1998: Elitzur Delek
- 1998: New England Blizzard
- 1999: KR
- 2000–2001: Nirosoft Carmiel
- 2002: Elitzur Holon
- 2002–2003: A.S. Ramat-Hasharon
- 2003–2004: Lotos Gdynia
- 2005–2006: ŽKK Gospić
- 2006–2008: A.S. Ramat-Hasharon

Coaching
- 2010–2011: Elitzur Netanya (assistant)
- 2012: Israel (assistant)
- 2016–2017: Israel U-16 (assistant)

Career highlights
- As player: Úrvalsdeild Foreign Player of the Year (1999); Croatian champion (2006); Icelandic champion (1999); 4× Israeli champion; Polish champion (2004); Icelandic Basketball Cup (1999); 4× Israeli Basketball Cup
- Stats at Basketball Reference

Limor Mizrachi (Hebrew: לימור מזרחי; born June 24, 1970) is an Israeli former professional basketball player and a former member of the Israeli women's national basketball team. During her career, she won a total of seven national championships in Croatia, Iceland, Israel and Poland.

== College ==
Mizrachi played for Maryland during the 1991–92 season. She started all 30 games for the Terrapins and helped them reach the National Collegiate Athletic Association East Regional final. She left the school and returned to Israel after her mother was diagnosed with cancer.

== Career ==
In 1997, Mizrachi tried out for the New York Liberty but did not make the final cut.

In 1998, Mizrachi became the first Israeli to play professional basketball in the United States when she played for New England Blizzard in the American Basketball League until it folded on December 22, 1998.

In January 1999, Mizrachi joined KR of the Icelandic top-tier 1. deild kvenna. On February 6, she helped KR win the Icelandic Basketball Cup after beating ÍS in the cup finals. Prior to her arrival, KR had won its first twelve league games. They finished the season with a perfect 20–0 record and swept through the playoffs, winning all five games and claiming the 1999 national championship. After the season she was named the Foreign Player of the Year.

In 2003, she won the Israeli championship and the Israeli Basketball Cup with A.S. Ramat-Hasharon. For the season she averaged 14.4 points and league leading 6.5 assists per game.

In 2004, Mizrachi won the Polish championship as a member of Lotos Gdynia.

In 2006, she won the Croatian championship as a member of ŽKK Gospić.

Mizrachi retired in 2008 after playing two seasons with A.S. Ramat-Hasharon.

== Israeli national basketball team ==
Mizrachi played for the Israeli national basketball team from 1988 to 2004, helping them to the European Women Basketball Championship in 1991 and 2003.

== Awards, titles and accomplishments ==
=== Individual awards ===
==== Iceland ====
- Úrvalsdeild Foreign Player of the Year: 1999

=== Titles ===
==== Croatia ====
- Croatian league champion: 2006

==== Iceland ====
- Icelandic league champion: 1999
- Icelandic Basketball Cup: 1999

==== Israel ====
- Israeli league champion (4): 2003
- Israeli Basketball Cup (4):

==== Israel ====
- Polish league champion: 2004

=== Accomplishments ===
==== Israel ====
- Ligat ha'Al assists leader : 2003, 2005
