= EuroBasket Women 1950 =

EuroBasket 1950 Women
2nd FIBA European Women's Basketball Championship

Tournament details
- Host country: Hungary
- Dates: May 14 – May 20
- Teams: 12
- Venue: 1 (in 1 host city)

Final positions
- Champions: Soviet Union (1st title)

Tournament statistics
- Top scorer: (France) Colchen (14.5)
- PPG (Team): Soviet Union (72.4)

Official website
- Official website (archive)

The 1950 European Championship for Women was the 2nd regional championship held by FIBA Europe for women. The competition was held in Budapest, Hungary and took place May 14–20, 1950. The Soviet Union won the gold medal, with Hungary and Czechoslovakia winning silver and bronze, respectively.

== Preliminary round ==
The teams where divided in three groups of 4 squads each, with only the top two from each group advancing to the medal round. The remaining teams were put on a second group to define the 7th to 12th spot in the final standings.

=== Group A ===
Pos	Team	Pld	W	L	PF	PA	PD	Pts	Qualification
1	Soviet Union	3	3	0	229	67	+162	6	Advance to final round
2	France	3	2	1	109	143	−34	5	Advance to final round
3	Romania	3	1	2	91	146	−55	4	Advance to 7th–12th round
4	Belgium	3	0	3	117	190	−73	3	Advance to 7th–12th round

Source: Archive FIBA
Rules for classification: 1) Points; 2) Head-to-head results; 3) Points difference; 4) Points scored.

May 14, 1950
10:30

Boxscore

Soviet Union	91–31	Belgium
Scoring by half: 42–19, 49–12
Pts: Moiseeva, Alekseeva 19		Pts: Thijs 9

Budapest

May 14, 1950
21:45

Boxscore

France	39–26	Romania
Scoring by half: 25–12, 14–14
Pts: Colchen 13		Pts: Sadeanu 9

Budapest

May 15, 1950
16:00

Boxscore

Romania	49–41	Belgium
Scoring by half: 26–19, 23–22
Pts: Sadeanu 16		Pts: Van Geert 10

Budapest

May 15, 1950
21:45

Boxscore

Soviet Union	72–20	France
Scoring by half: 31–9, 41–11
Pts: Maksimelianova 24		Pts: Henry 5

Budapest

May 16, 1950
17:30

Boxscore

Soviet Union	66–16	Romania
Scoring by half: 26–4, 40–12
Pts: Maksimova 11		Pts: Cristea 5

Budapest

May 16, 1950
21:45

Boxscore

Belgium	45–50	France
Scoring by half: 17–26, 28–24
Pts: Verset 9		Pts: Colchen 24

Budapest

=== Group B ===
Pos	Team	Pld	W	L	PF	PA	PD	Pts	Qualification
1	Hungary (H)	3	3	0	215	66	+149	6	Advance to final round
2	Poland	3	2	1	127	95	+32	5	Advance to final round
3	Austria	3	1	2	72	126	−54	4	Advance to 7th–12th round
4	Israel	3	0	3	44	171	−127	3	Advance to 7th–12th round

Source: Archive FIBA
Rules for classification: 1) Points; 2) Head-to-head results; 3) Points difference; 4) Points scored.
(H) Hosts

May 14, 1950
12:00

Boxscore

Poland	52–18	Austria
Scoring by half: 20–7, 32–11
Pts: Czopek, Parszniak 12		Pts: Lechner 5

Budapest

May 14, 1950
20:15

Boxscore

Hungary	95–13	Israel
Scoring by half: 53–7, 42–6
Pts: Szabo-Nagyne 20		Pts: Schwarz, Bronstein 4

Budapest

May 15, 1950
11:00

Boxscore

Israel	12–32	Austria
Scoring by half: 5–15, 7–17
Pts: Kaminer 7		Pts: Lechner 10

Budapest

May 15, 1950
17:30

Boxscore

Poland	31–58	Hungary
Scoring by half: 15–24, 16–34
Pts: Rogowska-Markowska, Czopek 7		Pts: Nagy 22

Budapest

May 16, 1950
11:00

Boxscore

Hungary	62–22	Austria
Scoring by half: 42–11, 20–11
Pts: Pirik-Blahone 23		Pts: Kronenbitter 10

Budapest

May 16, 1950
16:00

Boxscore

Poland	44–19	Israel
Scoring by half: 25–7, 19–12
Pts: Wojewodzka 12		Pts: Kaminer 6

Budapest

=== Group C ===
Pos	Team	Pld	W	L	PF	PA	PD	Pts	Qualification
1	Czechoslovakia	3	3	0	158	69	+89	6	Advance to final round
2	Italy	3	2	1	166	75	+91	5	Advance to final round
3	Netherlands	3	1	2	66	148	−82	4	Advance to 7th–12th round
4	Switzerland	3	0	3	63	161	−98	3	Advance to 7th–12th round

Source: Archive FIBA
Rules for classification: 1) Points; 2) Head-to-head results; 3) Points difference; 4) Points scored.

May 14, 1950
16:00

Boxscore

Italy	71–17	Netherlands
Scoring by half: 27–13, 44–4
Pts: Caciolli 13		Pts: Jansen-van Gent 7

Budapest

May 14, 1950
17:30

Boxscore

Czechoslovakia	70–16	Switzerland
Scoring by half: 28–5, 42–11
Pts: Chytilova 19		Pts: Pfeuti 8

Budapest

May 15, 1950
12:30

Boxscore

Netherlands	30–29	Switzerland
Scoring by half: 9–16, 21–13
Pts: Woudhuizen 8		Pts: Hugonner 8

Budapest

May 15, 1950
20:15

Boxscore

Italy	34–40	Czechoslovakia
Scoring by half: 21–21, 13–19
Pts: L. Ronchetti 12		Pts: Kopackova-Ezrova 10

Budapest

May 16, 1950
12:30

Boxscore

Czechoslovakia	48–19	Netherlands
Scoring by half: 16–11, 32–8
Pts: Fragnerova 14		Pts: van Petten 7

Budapest

May 16, 1950
20:15

Boxscore

Italy	61–18	Switzerland
Scoring by half: 36–10, 25–8
Pts: Tommasini, Folliero 11		Pts: Bartschi 5

Budapest

== Final round ==
=== 1st to 6th place ===
Pos	Team	Pld	W	L	PF	PA	PD	Pts	Qualification
1	Soviet Union	5	5	0	350	128	+222	10	Champions
2	Hungary (H)	5	4	1	224	185	+39	9	
3	Czechoslovakia	5	3	2	205	206	−1	8	
4	France	5	2	3	197	257	−60	7	
5	Italy	5	1	4	168	217	−49	6	
6	Poland	5	0	5	116	267	−151	5	

Source: Archive FIBA
Rules for classification: 1) Points; 2) Head-to-head results; 3) Points difference; 4) Points scored.
(H) Hosts

May 17, 1950
16:00

Boxscore

Czechoslovakia	41–81	Soviet Union
Scoring by half: 13–41, 28–40
Pts: Fragnerova 12		Pts: Moiseeva 25

Budapest

May 17, 1950
17:30

Boxscore

Italy	39–20	Poland
Scoring by half: 17–6, 22–14
Pts: Tommasini 12		Pts: Rogowska-Markowska 6

Budapest

May 17, 1950
20:15

Boxscore

Hungary	56–49	France
Scoring by half: 39–14, 17–35
Pts: Pirik-Blahone 20		Pts: Boisset 14

Budapest

May 18, 1950
17:30

Boxscore

Czechoslovakia	52–22	France
Scoring by half: 25–3, 27–19
Pts: Fragnerova 19		Pts: Bejaud 8

Budapest

May 18, 1950
20:15

Boxscore

Soviet Union	87–19	Poland
Scoring by half: 51–11, 36–8
Pts: Pimenova 22		Pts: Rogowska-Markowska 4

Budapest

May 18, 1950
21:45

Boxscore

Hungary	29–28	Italy
Scoring by half: 13–15, 16–13
Pts: Szabo-Nagyne 7		Pts: L. Ronchetti 9

Budapest

May 19, 1950
17:30

Boxscore

Poland	26–43	France
Scoring by half: 15–24, 11–19
Pts: Parszniak 8		Pts: Colchen 15

Budapest

May 19, 1950
20:15

Boxscore

Soviet Union	65–16	Italy
Scoring by half: 33–4, 32–12
Pts: Mamentieva 19		Pts: Bertea 5

Budapest

May 19, 1950
21:45

Boxscore

Hungary	49–32	Czechoslovakia
Scoring by half: 29–9, 20–23
Pts: Fekete-Molnarne 11		Pts: Chytilova 8

Budapest

May 20, 1950
16:00

Boxscore

Poland	20–40	Czechoslovakia
Scoring by half: 6–16, 14–24
Pts: Gruszczynska-Olesiewicz 6		Pts: Fragnerova 12

Budapest

May 20, 1950
17:30

Boxscore

France	63–51	Italy
Scoring by half: 30–22, 33–29
Pts: Colchen 25		Pts: L. Ronchetti 11

Budapest

May 20, 1950
19:05

Boxscore

Hungary	32–45	Soviet Union
Scoring by half: 24–22, 8–23
Pts: Pirik-Blahone 11		Pts: Zarkovskaya 12

Budapest

=== 7th to 12th place ===
Pos	Team	Pld	W	L	PF	PA	PD	Pts
7	Romania	5	5	0	193	130	+63	10
8	Belgium	5	4	1	211	161	+50	9
9	Switzerland	5	2	3	141	143	−2	7
10	Austria	5	2	3	131	149	−18	7
11	Israel	5	1	4	121	172	−51	6
12	Netherlands	5	1	4	120	162	−42	6

Source: Archive FIBA
Rules for classification: 1) Points; 2) Head-to-head results; 3) Points difference; 4) Points scored.

May 17, 1950
11:00

Boxscore

Switzerland	28–21	Israel
Scoring by half: 11–6, 17–15
Pts: Vuagniaux 9		Pts: Nudel 6

Budapest

May 17, 1950
12:30

Boxscore

Austria	31–47	Belgium
Scoring by half: 13–22, 18–25
Pts: Ivan 12		Pts: Van Mol 14

Budapest

May 17, 1950
21:45

Boxscore

Netherlands	25–27 (OT)	Romania
Scoring by half: 13–10, 10–13 Overtime: 2–4
Pts: van Beek 10		Pts: Deli 10

Budapest

May 18, 1950
11:00

Boxscore

Austria	26–28	Switzerland
Scoring by half: 8–12, 18–16
Pts: Dambock 10		Pts: Vuagniaux 11

Budapest

May 18, 1950
12:30

Boxscore

Romania	41–21	Israel
Scoring by half: 27–9, 14–12
Pts: Sadeanu 11		Pts: Kaminer 7

Budapest

May 18, 1950
16:00

Boxscore

Netherlands	24–41	Belgium
Scoring by half: 12–14, 12–27
Pts: Brun-Bouwmuster 14		Pts: Van Geert 19

Budapest

May 19, 1950
11:00

Boxscore

Israel	28–50	Belgium
Scoring by half: 11–22, 17–28
Pts: Kaminer 12		Pts: Van Mol 18

Budapest

May 19, 1950
12:30

Boxscore

Romania	34–27	Switzerland
Scoring by half: 20–16, 14–11
Pts: Deli 9		Pts: Bartschi 8

Budapest

May 19, 1950
16:00

Boxscore

Austria	26–20	Netherlands
Scoring by half: 9–10, 17–10
Pts: Dambock 9		Pts: Brun-Bouwmuster 8

Budapest

May 20, 1950
9:00

Boxscore

Israel	39–21	Netherlands
Scoring by half: 9–11, 30–10
Pts: Bronstein 11		Pts: Woudhuizen 9

Budapest

May 20, 1950
10:20

Boxscore

Belgium	32–29	Switzerland
Scoring by half: 15–16, 17–13
Pts: Verset 12		Pts: Hugonner 10

Budapest

May 20, 1950
11:40

Boxscore

Austria	16–42	Romania
Scoring by half: 11–23, 5–19
Pts: Dambock 8		Pts: Sadeanu 21

Budapest

== Final ranking ==
Rank	Team	Record
Gold medal	Soviet Union	7–0
Silver medal	Hungary	6–1
Bronze medal	Czechoslovakia	5–2
4th	France	4–3
5th	Italy	3–4
6th	Poland	2–5
7th	Romania	5–2
8th	Belgium	4–3
9th	Switzerland	2–5
10th	Austria	2–5
11th	Israel	1–6
12th	Netherlands	1–6
