= Maryland Terrapins women's basketball =

Women's college basketball team

2026–27 Maryland Terrapins women's basketball team
- University: University of Maryland
- Head coach: Brenda Frese (25th season)
- Location: College Park, Maryland
- Arena: Xfinity Center (capacity: 17,950)
- Conference: Big Ten
- Nickname: Terrapins
- Colors: Red, white, black, and gold

NCAA Division I tournament champions
- 2006
Other NCAA Division I tournament results
Final Four	1982, 1989, 2006, 2014, 2015
Elite Eight	1982, 1988, 1989, 1992, 2006, 2008, 2009, 2012, 2014, 2015, 2023
Sweet Sixteen	1982, 1983, 1988, 1989, 1992, 2006, 2008, 2009, 2012, 2013, 2014, 2015, 2017, 2021, 2022, 2023, 2025
Appearances	1982, 1983, 1984, 1986, 1988, 1989, 1990, 1991, 1992, 1993, 1997, 2001, 2004, 2005, 2006, 2007, 2008, 2009, 2011, 2012, 2013, 2014, 2015, 2016, 2017, 2018, 2019, 2021, 2022, 2023, 2024, 2025, 2026

AIAW tournament runner-up
- 1978
Other AIAW tournament results
Final Four	1978
Quarterfinals	1978, 1979, 1980, 1981
Second round	1978, 1979, 1980, 1981
Appearances	1978, 1979, 1980, 1981

Conference tournament champions
- 1978, 1979, 1981, 1982, 1983, 1986, 1988, 1989, 2009, 2012, 2015, 2016, 2017, 2020, 2021

Conference regular-season champions
- 1979, 1982, 1988, 1989, 2009, 2015, 2016, 2017, 2019, 2020, 2021

The Maryland Terrapins women's basketball are an American college basketball team. The team represents the University of Maryland in National Collegiate Athletic Association Division I competition. Maryland, a founding member of the Atlantic Coast Conference (ACC), left the ACC in 2014 to join the Big Ten Conference.

The program won the 2006 NCAA Division I women's basketball tournament championship and has appeared in the NCAA Final Four five times (1982, 1989, 2006, 2014, 2015); Maryland also appeared once in the AIAW Final Four (1978). As members of the ACC, the Terrapins won regular season conference championships (1979, 1982, 1988, 1989, 2009) and an ACC-record ten conference tournament championships (1978, 1979, 1981, 1982, 1983, 1986, 1988, 1989, 2009, 2012). The program won the Big Ten Conference regular season and tournament championships in 2015, 2016, 2017, 2020, and 2021.

Since 2002, the team has been led by head coach Brenda Frese. Over her 23 season tenure, she has led the Terrapins to 20 NCAA tournament appearances, ten NCAA Sweet Sixteens, six NCAA Elite Eight, three NCAA Final Fours, and the 2006 NCAA National Championship.

== History ==
Women's basketball was first organized to play on campus in 1923. The early teams participated solely in intracollegiate competition, with classes or sororities competing against each other for a trophy. The team was officially recognized as a varsity sport in 1971, and was led by coach Dottie McKnight during its first four seasons. The Terps were successful from the start, winning their first state championship in the 1972–73 season. They went on to win ten ACC championships and one NCAA title.

On January 26, 1975, the Terps played host to Immaculata in the first nationally televised women's college basketball game. The game took place in Cole Field House. Some sources report that Immaculata won 80–48, while others report 85–63. On March 9, 2019, Maryland won its 1,000th game, becoming the 14th (unsure, based on 2017 data) team to win 1,000 games. It did so at home against Michigan in the Big Ten Semifinals, which it won by a score of 73–72.

The team has been led by three head coaches: Dottie McKnight (1971–1975), Chris Weller (1975–2002), and Brenda Frese (2002–present). Although McKnight only coached four seasons of Terps basketball, she quickly led her new team to success. She left with a record of 44–17 (.721). Weller, a University of Maryland alumna ('66) and former Terps player, took over the head coaching position in 1975. She led the Terps to numerous national championship appearances and a total of eight ACC championship titles. When she retired, Weller left with a 499–286 record (.636). At the end of the 2018–19 season, current coach Brenda Frese has a record of 458–124 (.787). She has also led her team to a national championship title, eight national championship appearances, and two conference championship titles. Frese is known for her recruiting skills, with Shay Doron being credited as her first major recruit.

== Notable players ==
Many Terps have gone on to national prominence, appearing in the Olympics and playing in professional leagues.

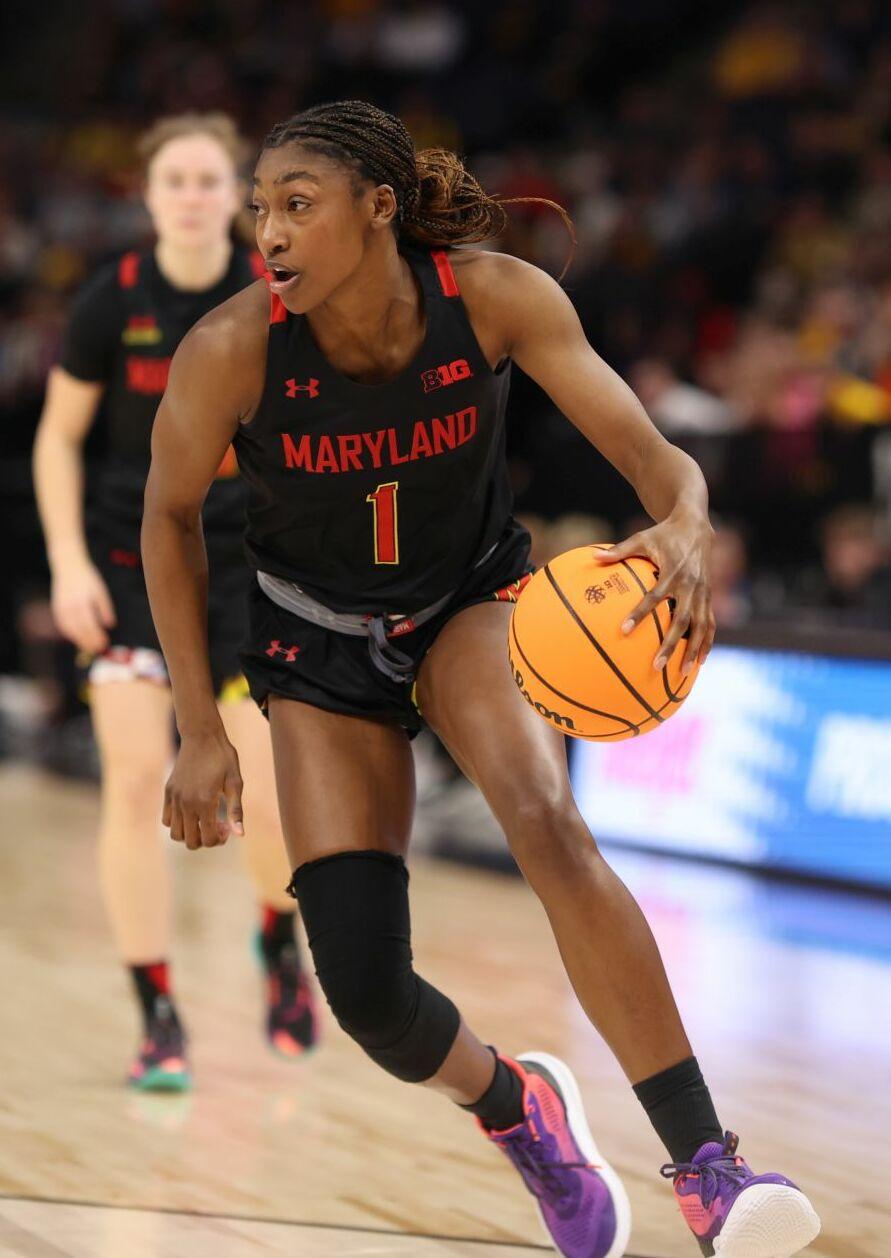
Miller with Maryland at the 2023 Big Ten tournament

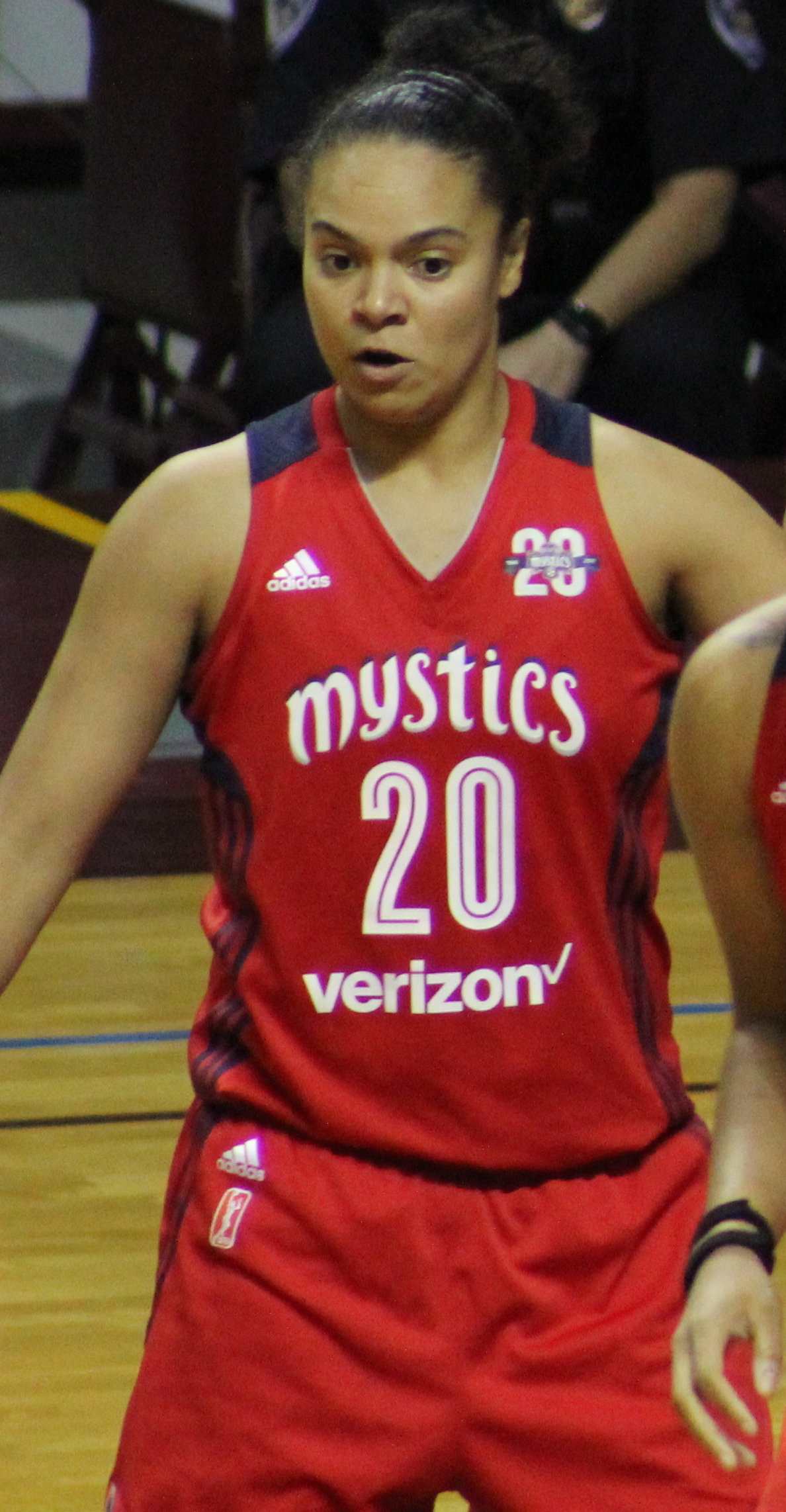
Toliver during the 2017 WNBA Semifinals

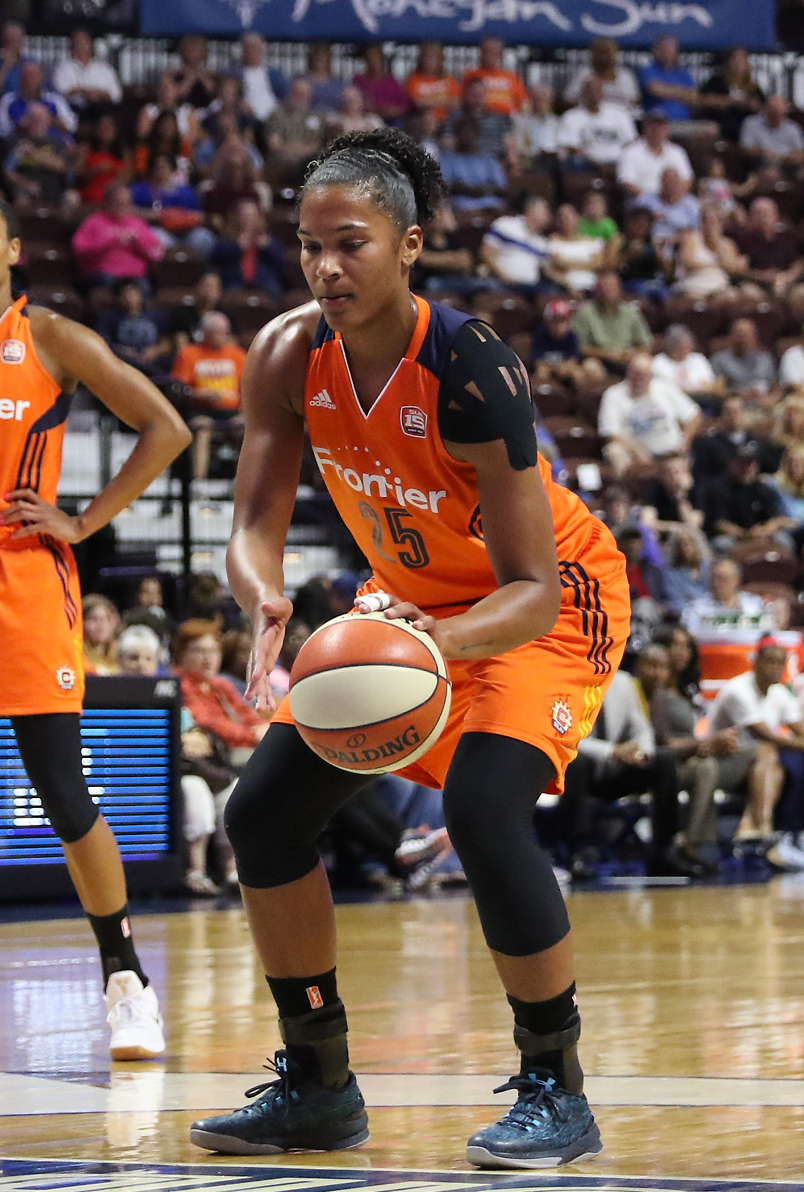
Thomas in 2017

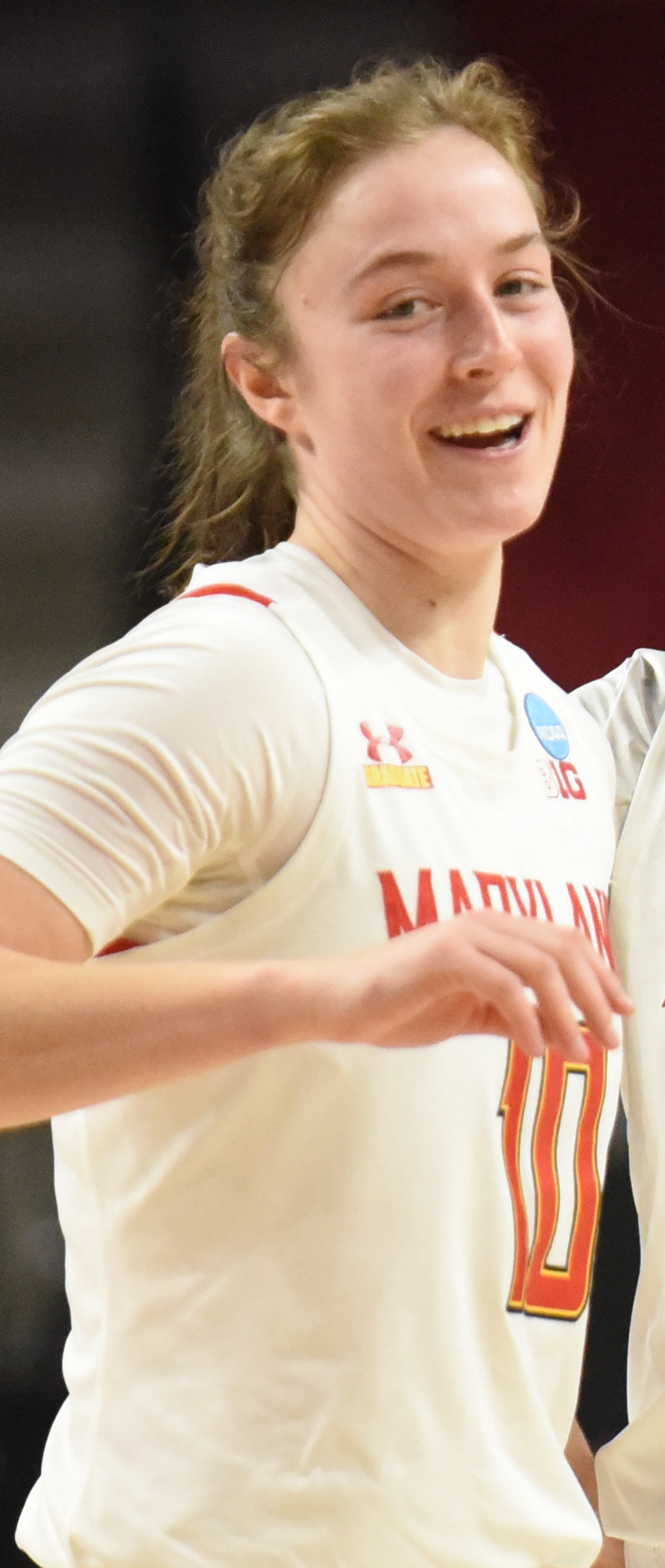
Abby Meyers

=== WNBA Players ===
- Alyssa Thomas, six-time WNBA All-Star for the Connecticut Sun (2014–2024) and Phoenix Mercury (2025-present)
- Brionna Jones, four-time WNBA All-Star for the Connecticut Sun (2017-2024) and Atlanta Dream (2025-present)
- Kristi Toliver, two-time WNBA champion (2016, 2019) and three-time All-Star who played for the WNBA's Chicago Sky (2009), Los Angeles Sparks (2010–16) and Washington Mystics (2017–2019, and 2023)
- Crystal Langhorne, two-time WNBA champion (2018, 2020) and two-time All-Star who played for the Washington Mystics (2008–2013) and Seattle Storm (2014–20)
- Diamond Miller, No.2 WNBA draft pick in 2023, guard for the Connecticut Sun, formerly of the Minnesota Lynx and Dallas Wings
- Marissa Coleman, one-time WNBA All-Star who played for the WNBA's Washington Mystics (2009–11), Los Angeles Sparks (2012–13) and Indiana Fever (2014–17)
- Kaila Charles, one-time WNBA champion (2026) who has played for five different WNBA teams (2020-present)
- Shatori Walker-Kimbrough, played for five different WNBA teams from 2017-2026
- Tianna Hawkins, one-time WNBA champion who played for the Seattle Storm (2013), Washington Mystics (2014–20, 2022-23), and Atlanta Dream (2021)
- Laura Harper, played for the WNBA's Sacramento Monarchs (2008–09) and is head coach of the Towson University women’s basketball team (2022-present)
- Angel Reese (transferred to LSU), two-time All-Star and player for the Chicago Sky (2024-25) and Atlanta Dream (2026-present)
- Shakira Austin (transferred to Ole Miss), center for the Washington Mystics (2022-present)
- Katie Benzan, player for the Washington Mystics (2023) and GM of the NBA G-League Salt Lake City Stars (2025-26)
- Vicky Bullett, Olympian in 1988 and 1992; played in Italy for Bari (1990–93) and Cesena (1993–97), in Brazil for the Data Control/Fluminense professional team, and for the WNBA's Charlotte Sting (1997–99) and Washington Mystics (2000–02)
- Katrina Colleton, played for the WNBA's Los Angeles Sparks (1997–98) and Miami SOL (2000–01)
- Shay Doron, Israeli, played for the WNBA's New York Liberty (2007–08), the Romanian League's Municipal MCM Târgovişte (2010), and the Israeli leagues' Elitzur Ramla (2007–08, 2010–present)
- Chloe Bibby, played for the WNBA's Golden State Valkyries and Indiana Fever (2025)
- Kelley Gibson, played for the WNBA's Houston Comets (2000–03)
- Jessie Hicks, played for the WNBA's Utah Starzz (1997–98), Orlando Miracle (2000–02), Connecticut Sun (2003), and San Antonio Silver Stars (2004)
- Abby Meyers, played for the Washington Mystics (2023)
- Saylor Poffenbarger, played for the WNBA's Chicago Sky (2026)
- Jakia Brown-Turner, played for the WNBA's Washington Mystics (2024)

=== Other Notable Alumni ===
- Christy Winters-Scott, Basketball Color Analyst for college basketball games for ESPN, FSN, The Big Ten Network (BTN), Monumental Sports Network, and Raycom Sports
- Lea Hakala, Olympian in 1984 (Finnish team)
- Tara Heiss, Olympian in 1980
- Kris Kirchner, Olympian in 1980
- Limor Mizrachi, Israeli, played for the ABL's New England Blizzard (1998)
- Jasmina Perazić, Olympian in 1984 (Yugoslavian team); played for the WNBA's New York Liberty (1997)
- Deanna Tate, played for the ABL's New England Blizzard (1997–98) and the Chicago Condors (1998)

== Roster ==
2026–27 Maryland Terrapins women's basketball team
Players
Coaches

Pos.	#	Name	Height	Year	Hometown
G	0	Rainey Welson	5 ft 10 in (1.78 m)	So	Hortonville	Greenville, WI
G	1	Lea Bartelme	5 ft 8 in (1.73 m)	So	Cinkarna Celje	Kisovec, Slovenia
G	3	Addi Mack	5 ft 9 in (1.75 m)	So	Minnehaha Academy	Minneapolis, MN
G/F	5	Ava McKennie	6 ft 2 in (1.88 m)	Jr	McDonogh School	McSherrystown, PA
G	7	Oluchi Okananwa	5 ft 10 in (1.78 m)	Sr	Worcester Academy; Duke	Boston, MA
F	11	Marya Boiko	6 ft 4 in (1.93 m)	So	MBA Moscow	Minsk, Belarus
G	24	Bri McDaniel	5 ft 10 in (1.78 m)		Kenwood Academy	Chicago, IL
G		Jordyn Jackson	6 ft 1 in (1.85 m)	Fr	St. James Performance Academy (VA)	Old Bridge, NJ
F		Mimi Thiero	6 ft 5 in (1.96 m)	Fr	Quaker Valley High School	Sewickley, PA
C		Eva-Grace Yebila	6 ft 4 in (1.93 m)	Fr	City of London Academy Southwark	London, England
F		Sunaja 'Nunu' Agara	6 ft 2 in (1.88 m)	Sr	Hopkins High School; Stanford	Minneapolis, MN
G		Chloe Sotell	6 ft 0 in (1.83 m)	Jr	Montverde Academy; Missouri	Stamford, CT
G		Trinity Jones	6 ft 1 in (1.85 m)	Fr	Naperville Central High School	Naperville, IL

Head coach

- Brenda Frese (Arizona)

Assistant coach(es)

- Carley Kuhns (Valdosta State)
- Kaitlynn Fratz (California (PA))
- Lindsey Spann (Penn State)
- Jessica Imhof (TCNJ)
- Noelle Cobb (La Verne)

Legend

- (C) Team captain
- (S) Suspended
- (I) Ineligible
- (W) Walk-on
- Injured
- Current redshirt

Roster

== 2007–08 season ==
Head coach Brenda Frese announced during the pre-season that she was pregnant. Because of this, she was unable to coach from the sidelines for most of the regular season. Newcomer assistant coach Daron Park would take on the role of acting head coach. With the coaching changes, the Terps improved to a 30–3 record, and ranked 5 and 6 in the AP and Coaches polls respectively. Key returning players include Marissa Coleman, Laura Harper, Crystal Langhorne, and Kristi Toliver, all of whom were on the 2006 NCAA Championship team. With the loss of Shay Doron, whose #22 jersey was honored this season, Frese brought in 5 recruits. Two weeks after giving birth to twin boys, Frese returned to the sidelines during the ACC women's basketball tournament. Maryland eventually lost to Duke in the semifinals.

== Year by year results ==
Season	Team	Overall	Conference	Standing	Postseason	Coaches' poll	AP poll
Dottie McKnight (Independent) (1971–1975)
1971–72	Dottie McKnight	12–2			AIAW Regional Tournament		
1972–73	Dottie McKnight	11–3			AIAW Regional Tournament		
1973–74	Dottie McKnight	10–6			AIAW Regional Tournament		
1974–75	Dottie McKnight	11–6			AIAW Regional Tournament		
Dottie McKnight:		44–17					
Chris Weller (Independent, ACC) (1975–2002)
1975–76	Chris Weller	20–4			EAIAW Regional Tournament		
1976–77	Chris Weller	17–6			EAIAW Regional Tournament		16
Atlantic Coast Conference
1977–78	Chris Weller	27–4	5–1	2nd	AIAW Finals		6
1978–79	Chris Weller	22–7	6–1	1st	AIAW Quarterfinals		8
1979–80	Chris Weller	21–9	5–2	T-2nd	AIAW Quarterfinals		6
1980–81	Chris Weller	19–9	5–2	3rd	AIAW Quarterfinals		8
1981–82	Chris Weller	25–7	6–1	1st	NCAA Final Four		3
1982–83	Chris Weller	26–5	10–3	T-2nd	NCAA First Round		7
1983–84	Chris Weller	19–10	10–4	2nd	NCAA First Round		17
1984–85	Chris Weller	9–18	4–10	T-6th			
1985–86	Chris Weller	17–13	6–8	5th	NCAA Second Round (Bye)		
1986–87	Chris Weller	15–14	6–8	5th			
1987–88	Chris Weller	26–6	12–2	T-1st	NCAA Elite Eight	8	9
1988–89	Chris Weller	29–3	13–1	1st	NCAA Final Four	3	5
1989–90	Chris Weller	19–11	7–7	4th	NCAA Second Round (Bye)		
1990–91	Chris Weller	17–13	9–5	T-2nd	NCAA First Round		
1991–92	Chris Weller	25–6	13–3	2nd	NCAA Elite Eight	8	8
1992–93	Chris Weller	22–8	11–5	T-2nd	NCAA Second Round	18	11
1993–94	Chris Weller	15–13	8–8	4th			
1994–95	Chris Weller	11–18	2–14	9th			
1995–96	Chris Weller	13–14	7–9	6th			
1996–97	Chris Weller	18–10	9–7	T-3rd	NCAA First Round		
1997–98	Chris Weller	15–13	7–9	6th			
1998–99	Chris Weller	6–21	3–13	T-7th			
1999–2000	Chris Weller	16–15	5–11	7th	WNIT Quarterfinals		
2000–01	Chris Weller	17–12	8–8	T-5th	NCAA First Round		
2001–02	Chris Weller	13–17	4–12	T-8th			
Chris Weller:		499–286					
Brenda Frese (ACC, Big Ten) (2002–present)
2002–03	Brenda Frese	10–18	4–12	8th			
2003–04	Brenda Frese	18–13	8–8	T-3rd	NCAA Second Round		
2004–05	Brenda Frese	22–10	7–7	6th	NCAA Second Round	24	
2005–06	Brenda Frese	34–4	12–2	T-2nd	NCAA Champions	1	3
2006–07	Brenda Frese	28–6	10–4	T-3rd	NCAA Second Round	14	6
2007–08	Brenda Frese	33–4	13–1	2nd	NCAA Elite Eight	7	5
2008–09	Brenda Frese	31–5	12–2	T-1st	NCAA Elite Eight	5	3
2009–10	Brenda Frese	21–13	5–9	9th	WNIT Sweet Sixteen		
2010–11	Brenda Frese	24–8	9–5	T-4th	NCAA Second Round	23	16
2011–12	Brenda Frese	31–5	12–4	T-3rd	NCAA Elite Eight	5	5
2012–13	Brenda Frese	26–8	14–4	T-2nd	NCAA Sweet Sixteen	10	12
2013–14	Brenda Frese	28–7	12–4	T-2nd	NCAA Final Four	11	9
Big Ten Conference
2014–15	Brenda Frese	34–3	18–0	1st	NCAA Final Four	4	4
2015–16	Brenda Frese	31–4	16–2	1st	NCAA Second Round	5	5
2016–17	Brenda Frese	32–3	15–1	T-1st	NCAA Sweet Sixteen	4	3
2017–18	Brenda Frese	26–8	12–4	2nd	NCAA Second round	16	18
2018–19	Brenda Frese	29–5	15–3	1st	NCAA Second round	9	9
2019–20	Brenda Frese	28–4	16–2	T-1st	NCAA Tournament cancelled due to COVID-19	4	5
2020–21	Brenda Frese	26–3	17–1	1st	NCAA Sweet Sixteen	7	8
2021–22	Brenda Frese	23-9	13-4	4th	NCAA Sweet Sixteen	11	11
2022–23	Brenda Frese	28-7	15-3	T–2nd	NCAA Elite Eight	14	13
2023–24	Brenda Frese	19-14	9-9	T–6th	NCAA First Round		
2024–25	Brenda Frese	25-8	13-5	T–3rd	NCAA Sweet Sixteen		
Brenda Frese:		581–166					
Total:		1124–469					
National champion Postseason invitational champion Conference regular season champion Conference regular season and conference tournament champion Division regular season champion Division regular season and conference tournament champion Conference tournament champion

== Postseason results ==
=== NCAA Division I ===
Maryland has appeared in the NCAA Division I women's basketball tournament 33 times. They have a record of 56–32.

Year	Seed	Round	Opponent	Result
1982	#2	First Round; Sweet Sixteen; Elite Eight; Final Four	#7 Stanford #3 Missouri #4 Drake #2 Cheyney	W 82–48; W 80–68; W 89–78; L 66−76
1983	#3	First Round; Sweet Sixteen	#6 Central Michigan #2 Old Dominion	W 94–71; L 57−74
1984	#6	First Round	#3 Cheyney	L 64−92
1986	#6	Second Round	#3 Ohio State	L 71−87
1988	#2	Second Round; Sweet Sixteen; Elite Eight	#7 St. Joseph's #3 Ohio State #1 Auburn	W 78–67; W 81–66; L 74−103
1989	#1	Second Round; Sweet Sixteen; Elite Eight; Final Four	#9 Bowling Green #4 Stephen F. Austin #2 Texas #1 Tennessee	W 78–65; W 89–54; W 79–71; L 65−77
1990	#6	First Round; Second Round	#11 Appalachian State #3 Providence	W 100–71; L 75−77
1991	#6	First Round	#11 Holy Cross	L 74−81
1992	#2	Second Round; Sweet Sixteen; Elite Eight	#10 Toledo #3 Purdue #1 Western Kentucky	W 73–60; W 64–58; L 70−75
1993	#2	Second Round	#7 SW Missouri State	L 82−86
1997	#9	First Round	#8 Purdue	L 48−74
2001	#8	First Round	#9 Colorado State	L 69−83
2004	#12	First Round; Second Round	#5 Miami (FL) #4 LSU	W 86–85; L 61−76
2005	#7	First Round; Second Round	#10 UW–Green Bay #2 Ohio State	W 65–55; L 65−75
2006	#2	First Round; Second Round; Sweet Sixteen; Elite Eight; Final Four; Title Game	#15 Sacred Heart #7 St. John's #3 Baylor #5 Utah #1 North Carolina #1 Duke	W 95–54; W 81–74; W 82–63; W 85−75 (OT); W 81–70; W 78–75 (OT)
2007	#2	First Round; Second Round	#15 Harvard #7 Ole Miss	W 89–65; L 78−89
2008	#1	First Round; Second Round; Sweet Sixteen; Elite Eight	#16 Coppin State #8 Nebraska #4 Vanderbilt #2 Stanford	W 80–66; W 76–64; W 80–66; L 87−98
2009	#1	First Round; Second Round; Sweet Sixteen; Elite Eight	#16 Dartmouth #9 Utah #4 Vanderbilt #3 Louisville	W 82–53; W 71–56; W 78–74; L 60−77
2011	#4	First Round; Second Round	#13 St. Francis (PA) #5 Georgetown	W 70–48; L 57−79
2012	#2	First Round; Second Round; Sweet Sixteen; Elite Eight	#15 Navy #7 Louisville #3 Texas A&M #1 Notre Dame	W 59–44; W 72–68; W 81–74; L 49−80
2013	#4	First Round; Second Round; Sweet Sixteen	#13 Quinnipiac #5 Michigan State #1 Connecticut	W 72–52; W 74−49; L 50–76
2014	#4	First Round; Second Round; Sweet Sixteen; Elite Eight; Final Four	#13 Army #5 Texas #1 Tennessee #3 Louisville #1 Notre Dame	W 90–52; W 69−64; W 73–62; W 76–73; L 61–87
2015	#1	First Round; Second Round; Sweet Sixteen; Elite Eight; Final Four	#16 New Mexico State #8 Princeton #4 Duke #2 Tennessee #1 Connecticut	W 75–57; W 85−70; W 65–55; W 58–48; L 58–81
2016	#2	First Round; Second Round	#15 Iona #7 Washington	W 74–58; L 65−74
2017	#3	First Round; Second Round; Sweet Sixteen	#14 Bucknell #6 West Virginia #10 Oregon	W 103–61; W 83−56; L 63–77
2018	#5	First Round; Second Round	#12 Princeton #4 NC State	W 77–57; L 60−74
2019	#3	First Round; Second Round	#14 Radford #6 UCLA	W 73–51; L 80−85
2021	#2	First Round; Second Round; Sweet Sixteen	#15 Mount St. Mary's #7 Alabama #6 Texas	W 98–45; W 100−64; L 61−64
2022	#4	First Round; Second Round; Sweet Sixteen	#13 Delaware #12 Florida Gulf Coast #1 Stanford	W 102–71; W 89−65; L 66−72
2023	#2	First Round; Second Round; Sweet Sixteen; Elite Eight	#15 Holy Cross #7 Arizona #3 Notre Dame #1 South Carolina	W 93–61; W 77−64; W 76−59; L 75−86
2024	#10	First Round	#7 Iowa State	L 86−93
2025	#4	First Round; Second Round; Sweet Sixteen	#13 Norfolk State #5 Alabama #1 South Carolina	W 82−69; W 111−108 (2OT); L 67–71
2026	#5	First Round; Second Round	#12 Murray State #4 North Carolina	W 99−67; L 66−74

=== AIAW Division I ===
The Terrapins made four appearances in the AIAW National Division I basketball tournament, with a combined record of 13–1.

Year	Round	Opponent	Result
1978	First Round; Quarterfinals; Semifinals; Championship Game	Tennessee; Southern Connecticut State; Wayland Baptist; UCLA	W 75–69; W 93–53; W 90–85; L 74–90
1979	First Round; Quarterfinals	Valdosta State; Old Dominion	W 73–66; L 51–69
1980	First Round; Quarterfinals	Texas; Tennessee	W 68–63; L 76–93
1981	First Round; Quarterfinals	Kentucky; Tennessee	W 83–82; L 67–79

== See also ==
- University of Maryland, College Park
- Maryland Terrapins
- Big Ten Conference
- Xfinity Center
- Cole Field House
- 2006 NCAA Division I women's basketball tournament
