= Raya Bronstein =

Israeli athlete and sports educator

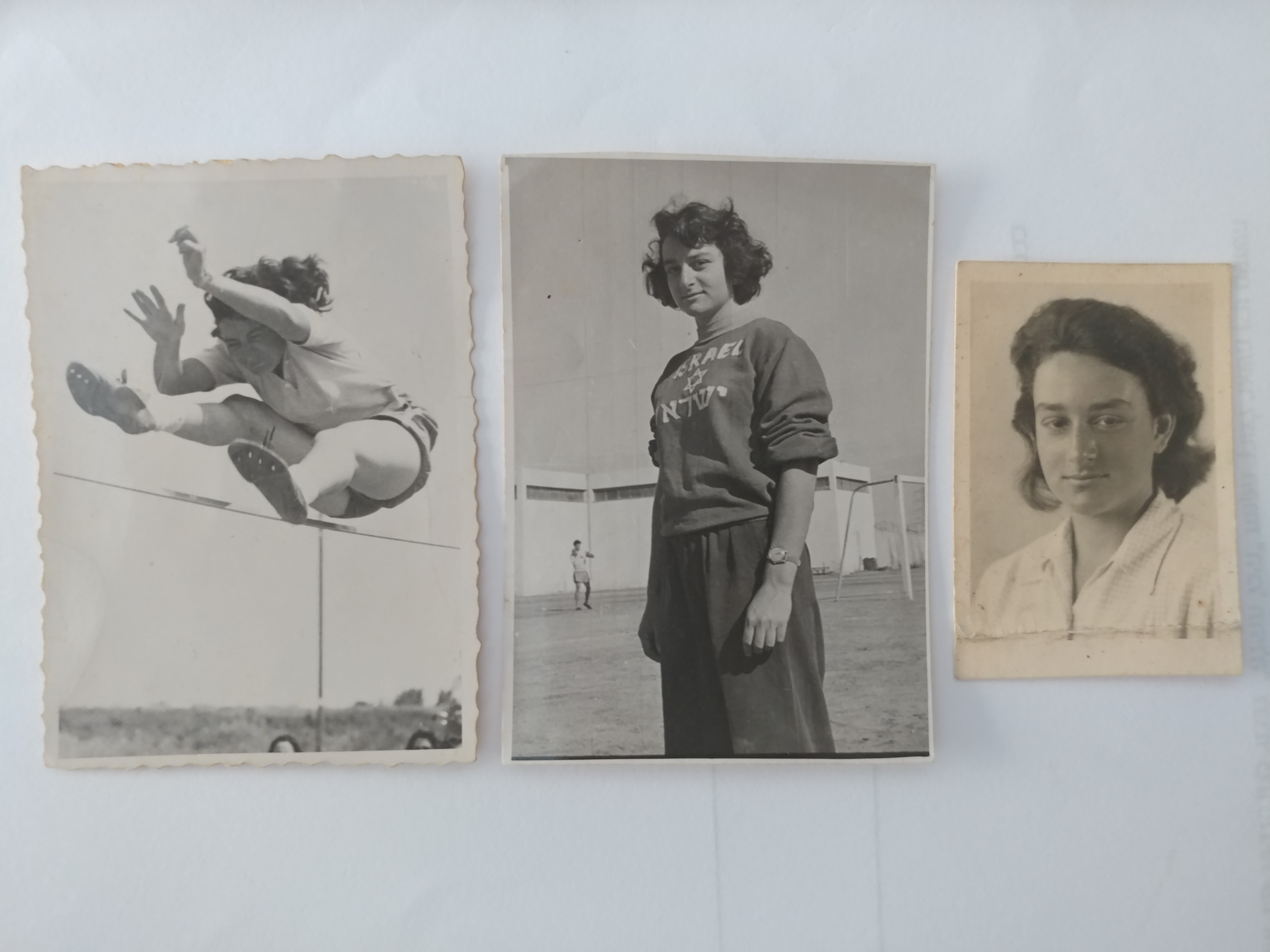
Raya Bronstein

Raya Bronstein (Hebrew: רעיה ברונשטיין; 1 October 1929 – 4 May 2023) was an Israeli athlete, sprinter, high jumper, shot putter, basketball player (the first Israeli national women's team, 1950), weightlifter, discus thrower and javelin thrower, Israeli champion and record holder, Maccabiah Games champion, and teacher in physical education.

She was born in Berlin to a family of the owners of a bookstore and "Kedem" publishing house. Her family emigrated from Nazi Germany to Eretz Israel in 1938 and eventually settled in Tel Aviv, where she lived in the same apartment until her last days.

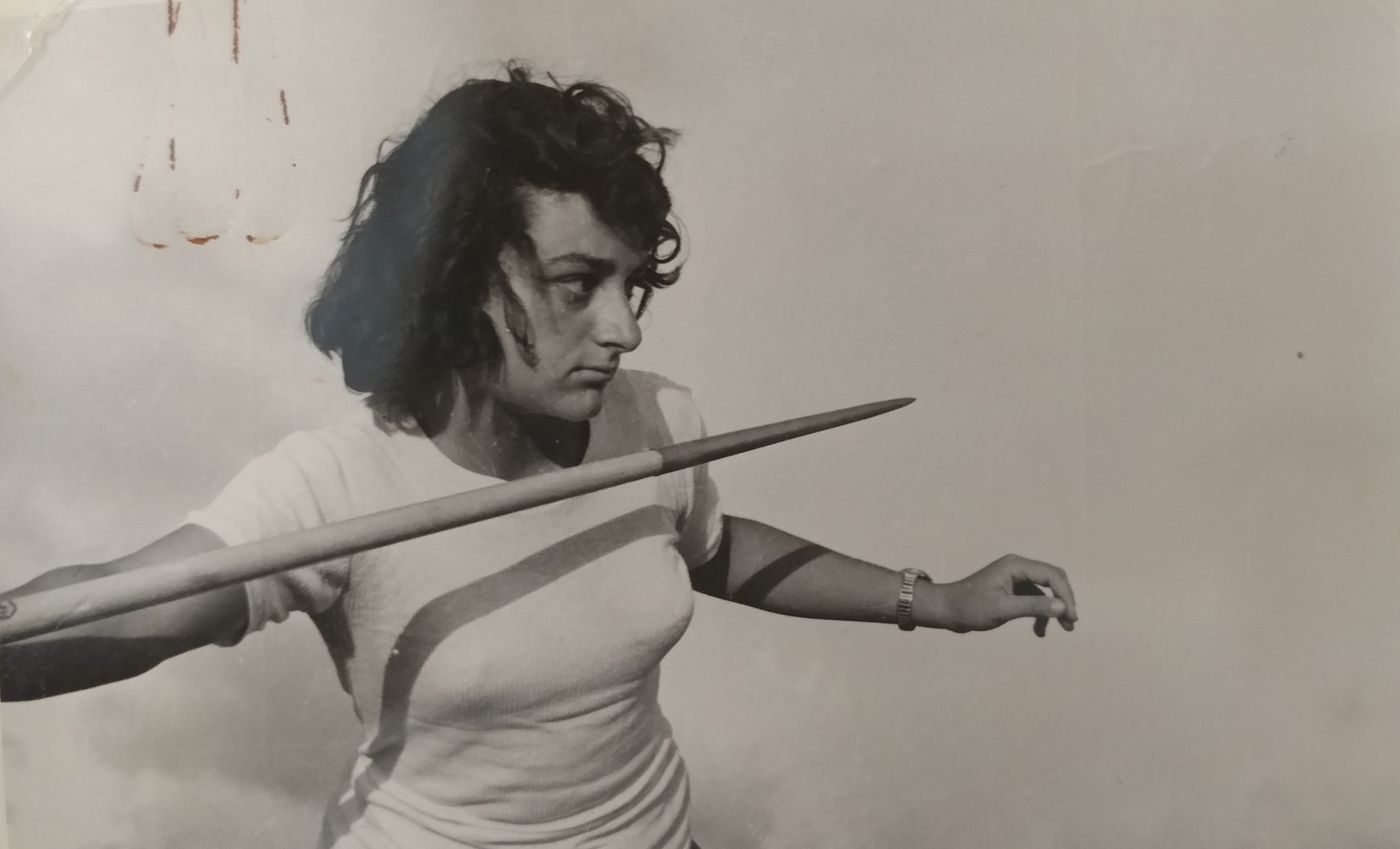

In March 1948, she enlisted in the Palmach. She was assigned to the 7th Battalion of the Negev Brigade, went through a sports instructors course and was sent to Kibbutz Dorot. She was to participate in the London Olympics, 1948, but Israel was denied participation on formal grounds. She also missed the Olympics in 1952 due to political struggles between Hapoel and the Maccabiah center.

In 1963 she was one of the four persons sent by Hapoel to Chad to organize the celebrations of the third year of its independence and later she was sent to Dakar, Senegal, to join the organizers of the opening ceremony of the African Games.

She retired from sports teaching in 1993, but continued engaging in recreational sports.

For her achievements in sports and in organizational work in sports she received several national and foreign awards.
