= EuroBasket Women 2003 =

2003 edition of EuroBasket Women

EuroBasket 2003 Women
29th FIBA European Women's Basketball Championship

Tournament details
- Host country: Greece
- Dates: September 19 – 28
- Teams: 12 (from 49 federations)

Final positions
- Champions: Russia (1st title)
- Runners-up: Czech Republic
- Third place: Spain
- Fourth place: Poland

Tournament statistics
- MVP: Lucie Blahůšková

Official website
- Official website (archive)

The 2003 European Women Basketball Championship, commonly called EuroBasket Women 2003, was the 29th regional championship held by FIBA Europe. The competition was held in Greece and took place from September 19 to September 28, 2003. Russia won the gold medal and Czech Republic the silver medal while Spain won the bronze. Lucie Blahůšková from Czech Republic was named the tournament MVP.

== Participating teams ==
Group A

- France
- Greece
- Israel
- Poland
- Czech Republic
- Serbia and Montenegro

Group B

- Belgium
- Russia
- Slovakia
- Spain
- Ukraine
- Hungary

== Venues ==
Group	City	Arena
A	Pyrgos	Pyrgos Indoor Hall
B	Amaliada	Basketball Hall of Amaliada
Knockout Stage and Final	Patras	Apollon Patras Indoor Hall

== Preliminary round ==
=== Group A (Pyrgos) ===
Team	Pts.	Pld	W	L	PF	PA	Diff
1. Czech Republic	10	5	5	0	435	336	+99
2. France	8	5	3	2	386	346	+40
3. Poland	8	5	3	2	353	309	+44
4. Serbia and Montenegro	8	5	3	2	374	352	+22
5. Greece	6	5	1	4	321	362	-41
6. Israel	5	5	0	5	293	457	-164

=== Group B (Amaliada) ===
Team	Pts	Pld	W	L	PF	PA	Pts
1. Spain	10	5	5	0	359	300	+59
2. Slovakia	8	5	3	2	345	340	+5
3. Russia	8	5	3	2	348	308	+40
4. Belgium	7	5	2	3	355	377	-22
5. Hungary	7	5	2	3	299	319	-20
6. Ukraine	5	5	0	5	301	363	-62

== Knockout stage ==
=== Championship bracket ===
Quarter-finals
September 26, 2003
France	66
Russia	79
September 26, 2003
Spain	76
Serbia and Montenegro	64
September 26, 2003
Czech Republic	98
Belgium	62
September 26, 2003
Slovakia	61
Poland	78

Semi-finals
September 27, 2003
Russia	78
Spain	71
September 27, 2003
Poland	66
Czech Republic	74

Final
September 28, 2003
Czech Republic	56
Russia	59
Third place
September 28, 2003
Poland	81
Spain	87

=== 5th place bracket ===
Semi-finals
September 27, 2003 - Patras
France	83
Serbia and Montenegro	61
September 27, 2003 - Patras
Slovakia	80
Belgium	86

Fifth place
September 27, 2003 - Patras
Belgium	75
France	94
Seventh place
September 27, 2003 - Patras
Slovakia	68
Serbia and Montenegro	67

=== 9th place bracket ===
Semi-finals
September 26, 2003 - Patras
Greece	76
Ukraine	68
September 26, 2003 - Patras
Hungary	85
Israel	77

Ninth place
September 27, 2003 - Patras
Greece	85
Hungary	83
Twelfth place
September 27, 2003 - Patras
Ukraine	107
Israel	87

2003 FIBA European champions

Russia
1st title

== Final standings ==
Place	Team	W-L
1	Russia	6–2
2	Czech Republic	7–1
3	Spain	7–1
4	Poland	4–4
5	France	5–3
6	Belgium	3–5
7	Slovakia	4–4
8	Serbia and Montenegro	3–5
9	Greece	3–4
10	Hungary	2–5
11	Ukraine	1–6
12	Israel	0–7
