= Laine Selwyn =

American basketball player (born 1981)

Personal information
- Born: May 16, 1981 (age 45) Coral Springs, Florida, U.S.
- Listed height: 5 ft 7 in (1.70 m)
- Listed weight: 143 lb (65 kg)

Career information
- High school: Coral Springs (Coral Springs, Florida)
- College: Pittsburgh (1999–2003)
- WNBA draft: 2003: undrafted
- Position: Point guard

Laine Selwyn (born May 16, 1981) is an American professional women's basketball player with Maccabi Ashdod (women's basketball). A guard, who has played previously in the WNBA and professionally on multiple teams throughout Europe and Israel, she was a former standout for the University of Pittsburgh's women's basketball team from 1999 to 2003.

== Pittsburgh statistics ==
Legend
GP	Games played	GS	Games started	MPG	Minutes per game
FG%	Field goal percentage	3P%	3-point field goal percentage	FT%	Free throw percentage
RPG	Rebounds per game	APG	Assists per game	SPG	Steals per game
BPG	Blocks per game	PPG	Points per game	**Bold**	Career high

Year	Team	GP	Points	FG%	3P%	FT%	RPG	APG	SPG	BPG	PPG
1999-00	Pittsburgh	**29**	184	**43.9**	28.1	78.0	2.7	2.9	0.9	0.0	6.3
2000–01	Pittsburgh	27	308	39.1	34.2	70.4	3.4	4.6	2.0	0.1	11.4
2001–02	Pittsburgh	27	394	41.5	21.3	76.0	5.9	5.9	2.5	0.1	14.6
2002–03	Pittsburgh	28	**458**	43.1	**36.5**	**81.7**	**6.2**	**5.9**	**3.1**	**0.4**	**16.4**
Career	Pittsburgh	111	1344	41.8	30.6	77.0	4.5	4.8	2.1	0.2	12.1
