= EuroBasket Women 1991 =

EuroBasket 1991 Women
23rd FIBA European Women's Basketball Championship

Tournament details
- Host country: Israel
- Dates: 12–17 June
- Teams: 8

Final positions
- Champions: Soviet Union (21st title)

Official website
- Official website (archive)

The 1991 European Women Basketball Championship, commonly called EuroBasket Women 1991, was the 23rd regional championship held by FIBA Europe. The competition was held in Israel and took place from 12 June to 17 June 1991. Soviet Union won the gold medal and Yugoslavia the silver medal while Hungary won the bronze.

== Qualification ==
=== Group A ===
Pl	Team	Pld	W	L	PF	PA
1	Italy	5	5	0	?	?
2	Poland	5	4	1	?	?
3	West Germany	5	3	2	383	388
4	Romania	5	3	2	?	?
5	France	5	1	4	365	397
6	Sweden	5	0	5	377	398

May 9, 1990	Poland	94–69	France
May 9, 1990	West Germany	77–76	Romania
May 9, 1990	Italy	70–65	Sweden
May 10, 1990	West Germany	83–82	Sweden
May 10, 1990	Italy	84–59	Poland
May 10, 1990	Romania	78–76	France
May 11, 1990	Italy	71–61	West Germany
May 11, 1990	Poland	?–?	Romania
May 11, 1990	France	74–70	Sweden
May 12, 1990	Italy	?–?	Romania
May 12, 1990	Poland	73–66	Sweden
May 12, 1990	West Germany	86–83	France
May 13, 1990	Italy	69–63	France
May 13, 1990	West Germany	77–75	Poland
May 13, 1990	Romania	98–94	Sweden

=== Group B ===
Pl	Team	Pld	W	L	PF	PA
1	Hungary	5	4	1	?	?
2	Israel	5	3	2	?	?
3	Netherlands	5	3	2	317	316
4	Spain	5	3	2	308	336
5	Denmark	5	1	4	?	?
6	Greece	5	0	5	?	?

May 9, 1990	Israel	86–57	Spain
May 9, 1990	Netherlands	59–56	Denmark
May 9, 1990	Hungary	87–60	Greece
May 10, 1990	Israel	80–62	Denmark
May 10, 1990	Spain	64–62	Hungary
May 10, 1990	Netherlands	65–57	Greece
May 11, 1990	Hungary	?–?	Denmark
May 11, 1990	Netherlands	60–57	Israel
May 11, 1990	Spain	75–61	Greece
May 12, 1990	Hungary	?–?	Israel
May 12, 1990	Spain	67–65	Denmark
May 12, 1990	Denmark	?–?	Greece
May 13, 1990	Hungary	79–68	Netherlands
May 13, 1990	Denmark	62–45	Spain
May 13, 1990	Israel	60–55	Greece

== First stage ==
=== Group A ===
Pl	Team	Pld	W	L	PF	PA
1	Hungary	3	2	1	211	217
2	Bulgaria	3	2	1	203	198
3	Israel	3	1	2	166	198
4	(Czech Republic) Czechoslovakia	3	1	2	247	226

June 12, 1991	Hungary	76–64	Bulgaria
June 12, 1991	Israel	91–90	(Czech Republic) Czechoslovakia
June 13, 1991	Bulgaria	74–66	(Czech Republic) Czechoslovakia
June 13, 1991	Hungary	74–62	Israel
June 14, 1991	Czechoslovakia (Czech Republic)	91–61	Hungary
June 14, 1991	Bulgaria	65–56	Israel

=== Group B ===
Pl	Team	Pld	W	L	PF	PA
1	(Socialist Federal Republic of Yugoslavia) Yugoslavia	3	3	0	258	196
2	Soviet Union	3	2	1	237	196
3	Italy	3	1	2	196	206
4	Poland	3	0	3	168	261

June 12, 1991	Soviet Union	91–56	Poland
June 12, 1991	Yugoslavia (Socialist Federal Republic of Yugoslavia)	83–61	Italy
June 13, 1991	Italy	70–51	Poland
June 13, 1991	Yugoslavia (Socialist Federal Republic of Yugoslavia)	75–74	Soviet Union
June 14, 1991	Yugoslavia (Socialist Federal Republic of Yugoslavia)	100–61	Poland
June 14, 1991	Soviet Union	72–65	Italy

== Play-off stages ==
Semifinals
June 16
Hungary	80
Soviet Union	93
June 16
(Socialist Federal Republic of Yugoslavia) Yugoslavia	79
Bulgaria	56

Final
June 17
Soviet Union	97
(Socialist Federal Republic of Yugoslavia) Yugoslavia	84
Third place
June 17
Hungary	65
Bulgaria	61

5th to 8th places
June 16	Poland	80–69	Israel
June 16	Czechoslovakia (Czech Republic)	58–57	Italy
7th place
June 17	Italy	78–65	Israel
5th place
June 17	Czechoslovakia (Czech Republic)	67–46	Poland

1991 FIBA European Women's Basketball Championship champion

Soviet Union
Twenty-first title

== Final standings ==
Qualified for the 1992 Olympic Games
Qualified for the 1992 Pre-Olympic; Qualifying Tournament

Place	Team	PE
Gold medal	Soviet Union	Same position
Silver medal	(Socialist Federal Republic of Yugoslavia) Yugoslavia	▲2
Bronze medal	Hungary	▲4
4	Bulgaria	▼1
5	(Czech Republic) Czechoslovakia	▼2
6	Poland	New entry
7	Italy	▼2
8	Israel	New entry
