= Shay Doron =

Israeli basketball player (born 1985)

Shay Doron שי דורון
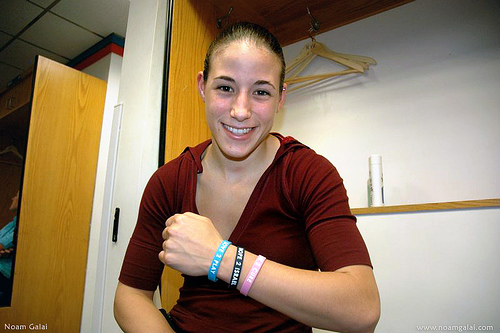
- Doron in 2007

Personal information
- Born: April 1, 1985 (age 41) Ramat Hasharon, Israel
- Listed height: 5 ft 9 in (1.75 m)
- Listed weight: 143 lb (65 kg)

Career information
- High school: Christ The King (Queens, New York)
- College: Maryland (2003–2007)
- WNBA draft: 2007: 2nd round, 16th overall pick
- Drafted by: New York Liberty
- Position: Shooting guard

Career history
- 2007: New York Liberty

Career highlights
- First-team All-ACC (2005); ACC All-Freshmen team (2004); McDonald's All-American (2003)
- Stats at Basketball Reference

Shay Doron (Hebrew: שי דורון; born April 1, 1985) is an Israeli professional basketball player in the Israeli league. She plays for Maccabi Ashdod.

== Biography ==
Doron was born in Ramat Hasharon, Israel, to Yehuda and Tamari Doron. For her first two years in high school, Doron played basketball for Rotberg High School in Ramat HaSharon, and led her team to three state championships and two cup championships. She also competed in track and field in Israel, and won over 60 medals in various events.

Hoping to play basketball in college, and dreaming of playing professionally in the WNBA, she moved to New York, (where her family had previously lived) to play her junior and senior years for the Christ The King Regional High School women's basketball team. She was the only Jewish/Israeli student among 1,800 Catholic students. As a junior, she led Christ the King to the New York State Federation finals, while scoring 17.1 points per game. The next year, she led the team to its 19th consecutive Brooklyn-Queens title, became the first girl from New York to play on the McDonald's All-American Team, and participated at the Nike Tournament of Champions, where she earned MVP and Player of the Tournament honors. In her junior and senior seasons, she was named the Gatorade Player of the Year from New York. During her final season, Doron averaged 17.2 points, 4.2 assists, 5.5 rebounds, and 6.0 steals per game, to lead the Royals to the No. 1 rank in the country.

== College career ==
Doron was widely considered coach Brenda Frese's first big-time recruit at the University of Maryland, and she played a pivotal role in the resurgence of the Maryland program. With her help, the team made four straight NCAA Tournament appearances, including Maryland's first ever national title in 2006 with a victory over Duke University.

Doron holds several school records, and ranks in University of Maryland's top 10 in field goal attempts, assists, steals, three-pointers, and three-point attempts. She also started and played in more games than any other player in school history, with 134 appearances and 119 starts. Doron was named to the All-ACC third team in 2004, All-ACC first team in 2005, and All-ACC second team and ACC All-Academic team in 2006. She was also named to the U.S. National Jewish Sports Hall of Fame in 2006.

Doron majored in criminal justice and criminology at Maryland.

== Maryland statistics ==
Legend
GP	Games played	GS	Games started	MPG	Minutes per game
FG%	Field goal percentage	3P%	3-point field goal percentage	FT%	Free throw percentage
RPG	Rebounds per game	APG	Assists per game	SPG	Steals per game
BPG	Blocks per game	PPG	Points per game	**Bold**	Career high

Year	Team	GP	Points	FG%	3P%	FT%	RPG	APG	SPG	BPG	PPG
2003-04	Maryland	30	405	37.0	33.8	77.3	3.7	2.2	1.3	0.0	13.5
2004-05	Maryland	32	**562**	42.6	28.7	79.7	**4.4**	3.2	**2.0**	0.3	**17.6**
2005-06	Maryland	**38**	511	39.9	**38.4**	**82.8**	3.8	**3.9**	1.8	0.3	13.4
2006-07	Maryland	34	400	**44.6**	34.1	82.6	4.0	2.7	1.6	0.1	11.8
Career	Maryland	134	1878	41.1	33.8	80.3	4.0	3.1	1.7	0.2	14.0

== International career ==
In the summer of 2003, Doron played for Israel's national team. In 2005, Doron guided the Under-20 Israeli National Team to the Division B European Championship title in Brno, Czech Republic, the first-ever international tournament title for an Israeli women's team. She averaged a tournament-best 24.7 ppg, and received Most Valuable Player honors.

She was the first Israeli to be named MVP of the European National Tournament, and was also the MVP of the qualifying round played in Turkey.

In 2005, she competed in the 2005 Maccabiah Games in Israel, where she led the US to a 5–0 record and a gold medal. She was selected Maccabiah MVP, her second tournament honor that summer.

== Professional career ==
=== WNBA ===
Doron was drafted by the WNBA's New York Liberty with the 16th pick in April 2007. Assigned jersey # 2, she saw game action only seven times in the 2007 regular season, totaling 10 points and 3 rebounds in 35 minutes of play. Doron also played limited minutes during the Liberty's 2007 playoff appearances.

After Shay Doron finished a successful season in Israel she has decided to take a few months off and to leave the New York Liberty before the beginning of the 2008 WNBA season. The New York Liberty approved her request on May 9, 2008.

=== European leagues ===
Doron played for defending champion Elitzur Ramla in the Israeli league during the 2007–2008 WNBA off-season. Ramla reached of the EuroCup Women competition on 2010–11 season, then went on to win the Israeli league title.

In 2010, she played for Municipal MCM Târgovişte in the Romanian League. She was competing with her club also in the EuroCup.

Shay Doron made her first return in the Israeli league in 2010 after she ended her contract in Romania and finally in 2014 after ending her contract in Turkey.

== See also ==
- Sport in Israel
- List of select Jewish basketball players
