= Basketball at the 1992 Summer Olympics – Women's team rosters =

Eight women's teams competed in basketball at the 1992 Summer Olympics.

== Group A ==
=== Brazil ===
Brazil women's national basketball team roster
Players
Coaches

Pos.	No.	Name	Age – Date of birth	Height	Club	Ctr.
	4	Hortência Marcari	32 – 24 September 1959
G	5	Helen Luz	19 – 23 November 1972	1.76 m (5 ft 9 in)
G	6	Nádia Bento de Lima	25 – 30 July 1966
F	7	Vânia Hernandes	29 – 30 June 1963
G	8	Maria Paula Silva	30 – 11 March 1962
G	9	Janeth Arcain	23 – 11 April 1969	1.82 m (6 ft 0 in)
G/F	10	Adriana Santos	21 – 18 January 1971
C	11	Marta Sobral	28 – 23 April 1964
F	12	Ruth de Souza	23 – 3 October 1968
C	13	Maria José Bertolotti	26 – 30 April 1966
C	14	Joycenara Batista	25 – 25 June 1967
F	15	Simone Pontello	20 – 8 September 1971

Head coach

- (Brazil) Maria Helena Cardoso

Legend

- Club – describes last
  club before the competition
- Age – describes age
  on 26 July 1992

=== Cuba ===
Cuba women's national basketball team roster
Players
Coaches

Pos.	No.	Name	Age – Date of birth	Height	Club	Ctr.
C	4	Andrea Borrell	28 – 10 November 1963
	5	Ana Hernández	29 – 10 November 1962
G	6	Olga Vigil	21 – 26 August 1970
F	7	Grisel Herrera	21 – 5 June 1971
G	8	Biosotis Lagnó	22 – 16 November 1969
C	9	Yudith Águila	19 – 6 October 1972	1.92 m (6 ft 4 in)
G	10	María León	25 – 7 April 1967	1.80 m (5 ft 11 in)
C	11	Yamilé Martínez	21 – 11 November 1970
G	12	Dalia Henry	27 – 14 June 1965	1.81 m (5 ft 11 in)
G	13	Liset Castillo	19 – 21 January 1973
	14	Regla Hernández	24 – 27 April 1968
C	15	Milayda Enríquez	22 – 7 October 1969

Legend

- Club – describes last
  club before the competition
- Age – describes age
  on 26 July 1992

=== Italy ===
Italy women's national basketball team roster
Players
Coaches

Pos.	No.	Name	Age – Date of birth	Height	Club	Ctr.
C	4	Elena Paparazzo	19 – 11 May 1973	1.93 m (6 ft 4 in)	Virtus Viterbo	(Italy)
G	5	Monica Bastiani	28 – 4 January 1964
F	6	Mara Fullin	27 – 13 January 1965		Pool Comense	(Italy)
G	7	Stefania Salvemini	25 – 24 October 1966
G	8	Anna Costalunga	22 – 24 January 1970	1.70 m (5 ft 7 in)	Ancona Basket	(Italy)
C	9	Francesca Rossi	24 – 2 June 1968		Basket Parma	(Italy)
F	10	Angela Arcangeli	21 – 12 April 1971		Pool Comense	(Italy)
F/C	11	Catarina Pollini	26 – 16 March 1966		Ahena Cesena	(Italy)
F/C	12	Stefania Stanzani	24 – 24 March 1968		Basket Bari	(Italy)
G	13	Silvia Todeschini	24 – 2 December 1967		Pool Comense	(Italy)
C	14	Giuseppina Tufano	27 – 19 June 1965		Trogylos Priolo	(Italy)
C	15	Stefania Passaro	28 – 11 December 1963		Pool Comense	(Italy)

Head coach

- (Italy) Franco Novarina

Legend

- Club – describes last
  club before the competition
- Age – describes age
  on 26 July 1992

=== Unified Team ===
Unified Team women's national basketball team roster
Players
Coaches

Pos.	No.	Name	Age – Date of birth	Height	Club	Ctr.
F	4	Olena Zhyrko	24 – 16 February 1968		Dynamo Kyiv	(Commonwealth of Independent States)
F	5	Elena Baranova	20 – 28 January 1972	1.92 m (6 ft 4 in)	Dynamo Kyiv	(Commonwealth of Independent States)
C	6	Irina Gerlits	26 – 29 April 1966
F	7	Elena Tornikidou	27 – 27 May 1965
F	8	Yelena Shvaybovich	26 – 3 February 1966
F	9	Maryna Tkachenko	26 – 29 August 1965
G	10	Irina Minkh	28 – 16 April 1964
C	11	Yelena Khudashova	27 – 10 July 1965	1.95 m (6 ft 5 in)
G	12	Irina Sumnikova	27 – 15 October 1964
	13	Elen Shakirova	22 – 2 June 1970
C	14	Natalya Zasulskaya	23 – 28 May 1969	1.91 m (6 ft 3 in)	PB Godella	(Spain)
F	15	Svetlana Antipova	25 – 20 August 1966

Head coach

- (Commonwealth of Independent States) Evgeny Gomelsky

Legend

- Club – describes last
  club before the competition
- Age – describes age
  on 26 July 1992

== Group B ==
=== China ===
China women's national basketball team roster
Players
Coaches

Pos.	No.	Name	Age – Date of birth	Height	Club	Ctr.
G	4	Cong Xuedi	29 – 13 May 1963
	5	Li Xin	22 – 5 November 1969
	6	Liu Jun	22 – 15 October 1969
	7	Wang Fang	25 – 14 January 1967
	8	Zheng Dongmei	24 – 23 December 1967
	9	He Jun	23 – 3 March 1969
	10	Peng Ping	25 – 14 January 1967
C	11	Zheng Haixia	25 – 7 March 1967
	12	Zheng Xiulin	26 – 21 July 1966
C	13	Li Dongmei	22 – 6 November 1969
	14	Liu Qing	27 – 6 August 1964
	15	Zhan Shuping	28 – 24 April 1964

Head coach

- (China) Li Yaguang

Legend

- Club – describes last
  club before the competition
- Age – describes age
  on 26 July 1992

=== Czechoslovakia ===
Czechoslovakia women's national basketball team roster
Players
Coaches

Pos.	No.	Name	Age – Date of birth	Height	Club	Ctr.
G	4	Iveta Bieliková	25 – 7 August 1966	1.71 m (5 ft 7 in)	MBK Ružomberok	(Czechoslovakia)
F	5	Martina Liptáková	26 – 27 September 1965
C	6	Anna Janoštinová	24 – 6 April 1968		BAC Mirande	(France)
F	7	Eva Němcová	19 – 3 December 1972	1.91 m (6 ft 3 in)	Stade Clermontois Auvergne Basket 63	(France)
G/F	8	Andrea Chupíková	21 – 16 July 1971		Jednota VSS Košice	(Czechoslovakia)
	9	Eva Antalecová	26 – 18 January 1966
C	10	Renáta Hiráková	21 – 27 May 1971		Lokomotíva Košice	(Czechoslovakia)
F	11	Adriana Chamajová	21 – 1 February 1971	1.91 m (6 ft 3 in)
C	12	Erika Buriánová	24 – 10 September 1967
C	13	Kamila Vodičková	19 – 19 December 1972
	14	Milena Rázgová	22 – 2 November 1969
C	15	Eva Berková	26 – 23 October 1965

Head coach

- (Czechoslovakia) Miroslav Vondřička

Legend

- Club – describes last
  club before the competition
- Age – describes age
  on 26 July 1992

=== Spain ===
Spain women's national basketball team roster
Players
Coaches

Pos.	No.	Name	Age – Date of birth	Height	Club	Ctr.
G	4	Patricia Hernández	21 – 8 September 1970
F	5	Carolina Mújica	27 – 14 September 1964		BEX Banco Exterior	(Spain)
F	6	Blanca Ares	21 – 30 December 1970		BEX Banco Exterior	(Spain)
C	7	María Pilar Alonso	23 – 8 October 1968		Dorna Godella	(Spain)
	8	Mónica Pulgar	21 – 19 May 1971
C	9	Margarita Geuer	26 – 3 May 1966		BEX Banco Exterior	(Spain)
G	10	Almudena Vara	21 – 23 March 1971
G	11	Ana Belén Álvaro	23 – 24 April 1969		Dorna Godella	(Spain)
G	12	Mónica Messa	25 – 7 October 1966		BEX Banco Exterior	(Spain)
F	13	Marina Ferragut	20 – 11 February 1972	1.90 m (6 ft 3 in)	BEX Banco Exterior	(Spain)
C	14	Elisabeth Cebrián	21 – 7 February 1971	1.96 m (6 ft 5 in)	BEX Banco Exterior	(Spain)
	15	Carlota Castrejana	19 – 25 April 1973

Head coach

- (Spain) José Buceta

Legend

- Club – describes last
  club before the competition
- Age – describes age
  on 26 July 1992

=== United States ===
United States women's national basketball team roster
Players
Coaches

Pos.	No.	Name	Age – Date of birth	Height	Club	Ctr.
G	4	Teresa Edwards	28 – 19 June 1964	1.65 m (5 ft 5 in)	Mitsubishi Electric Koalas	(Japan)
F/C	5	Daedra Charles	23 – 2 November 1968		Pool Comense	(Italy)
F	6	Clarissa Davis	25 – 4 June 1967
C	7	Tammy Jackson	29 – 3 December 1962		Chanson Cosmetics	(Japan)
G	8	Teresa Weatherspoon	26 – 8 December 1965
C	9	Vickie Orr	25 – 25 February 1967
F	10	Vicky Bullett	24 – 4 October 1967		Basket Puglia Bari	(Italy)
G	11	Carolyn Jones	22 – 29 July 1969
	12	Katrina McClain	26 – 19 September 1965		Ancona Basket	(Italy)
	13	Medina Dixon	29 – 2 November 1962
G	14	Cynthia Cooper	29 – 14 April 1963		Basket Parma	(Italy)
G	15	Suzie McConnell	25 – 29 July 1966

Head coach

- (United States) Theresa Grentz

Legend

- Club – describes last
  club before the competition
- Age – describes age
  on 26 July 1992
