= Basketball at the 1992 Summer Olympics – Women's tournament =

13th Olympic Basketball Tournament
- Barcelona 1992

Tournament details
- Olympics: 1992 Summer Olympics
- Host nation: Spain
- City: Barcelona
- Duration: July 30 - August 7, 1992

Women's tournament
- Teams: 8
Medals
Gold medalists	CIS
Silver medalists	China
Bronze medalists	United States

Tournaments
← Seoul 1988	Atlanta 1996 →

The women's tournament of basketball at the 1992 Summer Olympics at Barcelona, Spain, began on July 30 and ended on August 7, when the Unified Team defeated China 76–66 for the gold medal.

== Participants ==
- Brazil
- China
- Unified Team
- Cuba
- Czechoslovakia
- Italy
- Spain (Host)
- United States

== Format ==
- Two groups of four teams are formed, where the top two from each group advance to the knockout stage.
- Third and fourth places from each group form an additional bracket to decide 5th–8th places in the final ranking.
- The winning teams from the semifinals contest the gold medal. The losing teams contest the bronze.

Ties were broken via the following the criteria, with the first option used first, all the way down to the last option:

1. Head to head results

== Schedule ==
Legend
G	Group stage	¼	Quarter-finals	½	Semi-finals	B	Bronze medal match	F	Gold medal match

Thu 30	Fri 31	Sat 1	Sun 2	Mon 3	Tue 4	Wed 5	Thu 6	Fri 7	
G		G		G		½		F	B

== Preliminary round ==
The best two teams from each group advanced to the semifinals. The United States and Cuba advanced undefeated through the group phase but couldn't reach the finals and ended up facing each other for the bronze medal instead.

=== Group A ===
Pos	Team	Pld	W	L	PF	PA	PD	Pts	Qualification
1	Cuba	3	3	0	246	230	+16	6	Semifinals
2	Unified Team	3	2	1	244	222	+22	5	Semifinals
3	Brazil	3	1	2	237	241	−4	4	Classification round
4	Italy	3	0	3	190	224	−34	3	Classification round

Source: FIBA
Rules for classification: 1) points; 2) head-to-head points; 3) head-to-head goal average; 4) head-to-head number of points scored.

30 July 1992
13:00

Boxscore

Unified Team	89–91	Cuba
Scoring by half: 44–44, 45–47
Pts: Khudashova, Zasulskaya 20; Rebs: Zasulskaya 9 Asts: Sumnikova, Zhyrko 7		Pts: Borrell 28; Rebs: Borrell 9 Asts: Borrell, Hernández, Vigil 3

Palau Municipal d'Esports de Badalona, Barcelona

30 July 1992
22:00

Boxscore

Brazil	85–70	Italy
Scoring by half: 41–35, 44–35
Pts: Silva 24; Rebs: Sobral 12; Asts: Arcain 7		Pts: Fullin 20; Rebs: Rossi 8 Asts: 4 players 1

Palau Municipal d'Esports de Badalona, Barcelona

1 August 1992
11:00

Boxscore

Cuba	95–88 (OT)	Brazil
Scoring by half: 34–42, 46–38 Overtime: 15–8
Pts: Borrell 32; Rebs: Martínez 13; Asts: Borrell 3		Pts: Arcain 27; Rebs: Arcain 10; Asts: Silva 9

Palau Municipal d'Esports de Badalona, Barcelona

1 August 1992
22:00

Boxscore

Unified Team	79–67	Italy
Scoring by half: 49–37, 30–30
Pts: Zasulskaya 22; Rebs: Zasulskaya 12; Asts: Tornikidou 5		Pts: Fullin 20; Rebs: Pollini 10; Asts: Costalunga, Fullin 4

Palau Municipal d'Esports de Badalona, Barcelona

3 August 1992
11:00

Boxscore

Unified Team	76–64	Brazil
Scoring by half: 48–33, 28–31
Pts: Shvaybovich, Tornikidou 20; Rebs: Khudashova 11; Asts: Tornikidou 5		Pts: Marcari 26; Rebs: Sobral 6 Asts: 4 players 1

Palau Municipal d'Esports de Badalona, Barcelona

3 August 1992
13:00

Boxscore

Italy	53–60	Cuba
Scoring by half: 26–36, 27–24
Pts: Fullin 16; Rebs: Pollini 8 Asts: Todeschini 4		Pts: Enríquez, Vigil 11; Rebs: Enríquez 13; Asts: 5 players 1

Palau Municipal d'Esports de Badalona, Barcelona

=== Group B ===
Pos	Team	Pld	W	L	PF	PA	PD	Pts	Qualification
1	United States	3	3	0	318	181	+137	6	Semifinals
2	China	3	2	1	205	226	−21	5	Semifinals
3	Spain	3	1	2	181	238	−57	4	Classification round
4	Czechoslovakia	3	0	3	183	242	−59	3	Classification round

Source: FIBA
Rules for classification: 1) points; 2) head-to-head points; 3) head-to-head goal average; 4) head-to-head number of points scored.

30 July 1992
11:00

Boxscore

Czechoslovakia	55–111	United States
Scoring by half: 33–53, 22–58
Pts: Chupíková, Janoštinová 14; Rebs: Janoštinová 5 Asts: Bieliková, Buriánová, Janoštinová 2		Pts: Cooper 18; Rebs: Dixon 8 Asts: Dixon, Edwards 5

Palau Municipal d'Esports de Badalona, Barcelona

30 July 1992
20:00

Boxscore

China	66–63	Spain
Scoring by half: 27–31, 39–32
Pts: Peng 19; Rebs: 4 players 4 Asts: Li D., Li X., Liu J. 2		Pts: Ares 20; Rebs: Geuer 8 Asts: 5 players 1

Palau Municipal d'Esports de Badalona, Barcelona

1 August 1992
11:00

Boxscore

United States	93–67	China
Scoring by half: 47–33, 46–34
Pts: Dixon 19; Rebs: Orr 11; Asts: Edwards 8		Pts: Cong 18; Rebs: Zheng H. 11; Asts: He 6

Palau Municipal d'Esports de Badalona, Barcelona

1 August 1992
20:00

Boxscore

Czechoslovakia	58–59	Spain
Scoring by half: 30–27, 28–32
Pts: Buriánová 21; Rebs: Buriánová 7 Asts: Buriánová 4		Pts: Álvaro 10; Rebs: Geuer 7 Asts: Ares, Geuer 3

Palau Municipal d'Esports de Badalona, Barcelona

3 August 1992
20:00

Boxscore

Czechoslovakia	70–72	China
Scoring by half: 31–38, 39–34
Pts: Němcová 15; Rebs: Buriánová 8 Asts: Bieliková 4		Pts: Peng 15; Rebs: Liu Q. 6 Asts: Li X. 9

Palau Municipal d'Esports de Badalona, Barcelona

3 August 1992
22:00

Boxscore

Spain	59–114	United States
Scoring by half: 32–51, 27–63
Pts: Ares 13; Rebs: Geuer 6 Asts: Ares 4		Pts: Dixon 28; Rebs: McClain 8 Asts: Edwards 6

Palau Municipal d'Esports de Badalona, Barcelona

== Knockout stage ==
Semifinals
1	United States	73
4	Unified Team	79
3	Cuba	70
2	China	109

Gold-medal match
Unified Team	76
China	66
Bronze-medal match
United States	88
Cuba	74

5th−8th-place semifinals
1	Spain	92
4	Italy	80
3	Brazil	62
2	Czechoslovakia	74

5th-place game
Spain	59
Czechoslovakia	58
7th-place game
Italy	83
Brazil	86

=== Classification round 5th−8th place ===
Semifinals

5 August 1992
11:00

Boxscore

Brazil	62–74	Czechoslovakia
Scoring by half: 34–24, 28–50
Pts: Marcari 16; Rebs: Arcain 5 Asts: Arcain, Silva 4		Pts: Němcová 20; Rebs: Buriánová 10; Asts: Liptáková, Němcová 2

Palau Municipal d'Esports de Badalona, Barcelona

5 August 1992
20:00

Boxscore

Spain	92–80 (OT)	Italy
Scoring by half: 37–33, 28–32 Overtime: 13–13, 14–2
Pts: Álvaro, Ares 19; Rebs: Geuer 14; Asts: Geuer, Messa, Mújica 3		Pts: Fullin 18; Rebs: Rossi 5 Asts: Fullin 5

Palau Municipal d'Esports de Badalona, Barcelona

==== 7th-place game ====
7 August 1992
22:00

Boxscore

Brazil	86–83 (OT)	Italy
Scoring by half: 41–41, 37–37 Overtime: 8–5
Pts: Arcain 25; Rebs: Arcain 12; Asts: Silva 6		Pts: Pollini 28; Rebs: Stanzani 9 Asts: Todeschini 4

Palau Municipal d'Esports de Badalona, Barcelona

==== 5th-place game ====
7 August 1992
11:00

Boxscore

Czechoslovakia	58–59	Spain
Scoring by half: 29–25, 29–34
Pts: Bieliková 14; Rebs: Buriánová 4 Asts: Bieliková, Chupíková 2		Pts: Geuer 11; Rebs: Geuer 9 Asts: Ares, Messa 3

Palau Municipal d'Esports de Badalona, Barcelona

=== Semifinals ===
August 5
13:00

Boxscore

Cuba	70–109	China
Scoring by half: 30–57, 40–52
Pts: Borrell 16; Rebs: Borrell 8 Asts: Vigil 2		Pts: Cong X, Li X 20; Rebs: Zheng H 5 Asts: Zheng D 5

Palau Municipal d'Esports de Badalona, Badalona

August 5
22:00

Boxscore

United States	73–79	Unified Team
Scoring by half: 41–47, 32–32
Pts: Dixon 12; Rebs: McClain 16; Asts: three players 3		Pts: Zasulskaya 20; Rebs: Zasulskaya 8 Asts: Shvaybovich, Antipova 4

Palau Municipal d'Esports de Badalona, Badalona

=== Bronze-medal game ===
August 7
13:00

Boxscore

(bronze) United States	88–74	Cuba
Scoring by half: 44–44, 44–30
Pts: Edwards 18; Rebs: McClain 12; Asts: Edwards 5		Pts: Castillo 16; Rebs: Borrell 9 Asts: Henry 5

Palau Municipal d'Esports de Badalona, Badalona

=== Gold-medal game ===
August 7
22:00

Boxscore

(gold) Unified Team	76–66	China (silver)
Scoring by half: 43–35, 33–31
Pts: Zasulskaya 19; Rebs: Zasulskaya 6 Asts: Sumnikova, Antipova 4		Pts: Li D 12; Rebs: Li D 6 Asts: Li X 4

Palau Municipal d'Esports de Badalona, Badalona

== Awards ==
1992 Olympic Basketball Champions

Unified Team
First title

== Final standings ==
Rank	Team	W	L
1st place, gold medalist(s)	Unified Team	4	1
2nd place, silver medalist(s)	China	3	2
3rd place, bronze medalist(s)	United States	4	1
4th	Cuba	3	2
Eliminated at the preliminary round
5th	Spain	3	2
6th	Czechoslovakia	1	4
7th	Brazil	2	3
8th	Italy	0	5
