= 1992 United States women's Olympic basketball team =

- Head coach: Theresa Grentz

The 1992 United States women's Olympic basketball team competed in the Games of the XXV Olympiad, held in Barcelona, Spain.

Though the U.S. women's team got off to a quick start, they suffered a shocking upset in their semifinal match against the Commonwealth of Independent States (CIS). It was their third loss at the U.S. Olympic tournament and, to date, remains their final loss. The U.S. team settled for bronze after defeating Cuba in the Bronze Medal final.

== Roster ==
United States women's national basketball team roster
Players
Coaches

Pos.	No.	Name	Age – Date of birth	Height	Club	Ctr.
G	4	Teresa Edwards	28 – June 19, 1964	1.80 m (5 ft 11 in)	Mitsubishi Electric Koalas	(Japan)
F/C	5	Daedra Charles	23 – November 2, 1968	1.88 m (6 ft 2 in)	Pool Comense	(Italy)
F	6	Clarissa Davis	25 – June 4, 1967	1.85 m (6 ft 1 in)
C	7	Tammy Jackson	29 – December 3, 1962	1.91 m (6 ft 3 in)	Chanson Cosmetics	(Japan)
G	8	Teresa Weatherspoon	26 – December 8, 1965	1.73 m (5 ft 8 in)
C	9	Vickie Orr	25 – February 25, 1967	1.90 m (6 ft 3 in)
F	10	Vicky Bullett	24 – October 4, 1967	1.91 m (6 ft 3 in)	Basket Puglia Bari	(Italy)
G	11	Carolyn Jones	22 – July 29, 1969	1.75 m (5 ft 9 in)
PF	12	Katrina McClain	26 – September 19, 1965	1.85 m (6 ft 1 in)	Ancona Basket	(Italy)
SF	13	Medina Dixon	29 – November 2, 1962	1.93 m (6 ft 4 in)
G	14	Cynthia Cooper	29 – April 14, 1963	1.78 m (5 ft 10 in)	Basket Parma	(Italy)
G	15	Suzie McConnell	25 – July 29, 1966	1.62 m (5 ft 4 in)

Head coach

- (United States) Theresa Grentz

Legend

- Club – describes last
  club before the competition
- Age – describes age
  on 26 July 1992
- Source –

== Results ==
=== Group stage ===
30 July 1992
11:00

Czechoslovakia	55–111	United States
Scoring by half: 33–53, 22–58
Pts: Chupíková, Janoštinová 14; Rebs: Janoštinová 5 Asts: Bieliková, Buriánová, Janoštinová 2		Pts: Cooper 18; Rebs: Dixon 8 Asts: Dixon, Edwards 5

Palau Municipal d'Esports de Badalona, Barcelona

1 August 1992
11:00

United States	93–67	China
Scoring by half: 47–33, 46–34
Pts: Dixon 19; Rebs: Orr 11; Asts: Edwards 8		Pts: Cong 18; Rebs: Zheng H. 11; Asts: He 6

Palau Municipal d'Esports de Badalona, Barcelona

3 August 1992
22:00

Spain	59–114	United States
Scoring by half: 32–51, 27–63
Pts: Ares 13; Rebs: Geuer 6 Asts: Ares 4		Pts: Dixon 28; Rebs: McClain 8 Asts: Edwards 6

Palau Municipal d'Esports de Badalona, Barcelona

=== Semifinal ===
August 5
22:00

United States	73–79	CIS
Scoring by half: 41–47, 32–32
Pts: Dixon 12; Rebs: McClain 16; Asts: three players 3		Pts: Zasulskaya 20; Rebs: Zasulskaya 8 Asts: Shvaybovich, Antipova 4

Palau Municipal d'Esports de Badalona, Badalona

=== Bronze Medal Final ===
August 7
13:00

United States	88–74	Cuba
Scoring by half: 44–44, 44–30
Pts: Edwards 18; Rebs: McClain 12; Asts: Edwards 5		Pts: Castillo 16; Rebs: Borrell 9 Asts: Henry 5

Palau Municipal d'Esports de Badalona, Badalona

== See also ==
- 1992 Summer Olympics
- Basketball at the 1992 Summer Olympics
- United States at the 1992 Summer Olympics
- United States women's national basketball team
