= Cuba women's national basketball team =

Cuba
- FIBA ranking: 50 ▼3 (18 March 2026)
- Joined FIBA: 1937
- FIBA zone: FIBA Americas
- National federation: Federación Cubana de Baloncesto
- Coach: Margarito Pedroso

Olympic Games
- Appearances: 4

World Cup
- Appearances: 11
- Medals: Bronze: (1990

FIBA AmeriCup
- Appearances: 16
- Medals: : 1989, 1999, 2005, 2013 : 1995, 2001, 2003, 2007 : 1997
Home	Away

The Cuba women's national basketball team (Spanish: Selección femenina de baloncesto de Cuba) is administered by the Federación Cubana de Baloncesto.

== Achievements ==
=== Olympic Games ===
- 1980 – 5th place
- 1992 – 4th place
- 1996 – 6th place
- 2000 – 9th place

=== Friendship Games ===
Basketball at the Friendship Games

- 1984 – 3rd place

=== World Championship ===
- 1953 – 10th place
- 1957 – 12th place
- 1971 – 7th place
- 1983 – 10th place
- 1986 – 6th place
- 1990 – 3rd place
- 1994 – 6th place
- 1998 – 7th place
- 2002 – 9th place
- 2006 – 11th place
- 2014 – 12th place

=== FIBA Americas Championship ===
- 1989 – 1st place
- 1993 – 4th place
- 1995 – 2nd place
- 1997 – 3rd place
- 1999 – 1st place
- 2001 – 2nd place
- 2003 – 2nd place
- 2005 – 1st place
- 2007 – 2nd place
- 2009 – 4th place
- 2011 – 4th place
- 2013 – 1st place
- 2017 – 8th place
- 2019 – 6th place
- 2023 – 9th place
- 2027 – To be determined

=== Pan American Games ===
- 1967 – 5th place
- 1971 – 3rd place
- 1975 – 3rd place
- 1979 – 1st place
- 1983 – 2nd place
- 1987 – 4th place
- 1991 – 2nd place
- 1999 – 1st place
- 2003 – 1st place
- 2007 – 3rd place

== Team ==
=== Current roster ===
Roster for the 2023 FIBA Women's AmeriCup.

Cuba women's national basketball team roster
Players
Coaches

Pos.	No.	Name	Age – Date of birth	Height	Club	Ctr.
G	9	Yamara Amargo	38 – 28 June 1985	1.80 m (5 ft 11 in)	Santi Espiritu	(Cuba)
SF	10	Bexy Claro	21 – 5 October 2001	1.93 m (6 ft 4 in)	Santiago De Cuba	(Cuba)
PG	11	María Montero	24 – 3 November 1998	1.75 m (5 ft 9 in)	Guantánamo CB	(Cuba)
C	12	Nahomis Vargas	19 – 23 August 2003	1.85 m (6 ft 1 in)	CRC Quinta dos Lombos	(Portugal)
PF	17	Isabela Jourdain	19 – 28 November 2003	1.88 m (6 ft 2 in)	Clube Propaganda Natação	(Portugal)
PF	22	Melissa Despaigne	20 – 11 October 2002	1.89 m (6 ft 2 in)	Santiago De Cuba	(Cuba)
F	24	Suanly Tanis	28 – 13 December 1994	1.78 m (5 ft 10 in)	Santiago De Cuba	(Cuba)
G	30	Elianis Armentero	23 – 2 January 2000	1.75 m (5 ft 9 in)	Capitalinos de La Habana	(Cuba)
G	32	Betsy Guilarte	20 – 10 February 2003	1.86 m (6 ft 1 in)
G	55	Dairis Tornell	31 – 18 April 1992	1.76 m (5 ft 9 in)	Capitalinos de La Habana	(Cuba)
C	80	Enriqueta Neyra	26 – 3 January 1997	1.87 m (6 ft 2 in)	Santi Espiritu	(Cuba)
C	87	Rachel Contreras	23 – 23 July 1999	1.84 m (6 ft 0 in)	Ciego de Ávila	(Cuba)

Head coach

- (Cuba) Margarito Pedroso

Assistant coach(es)

- (Cuba) Ernesto Wright

Legend

- Club – describes last
  club before the tournament
- Age – describes age
  on 1 July 2023

=== Former squads ===
1980 Olympic Games

- Andrea Borrell
- Bárbara Becquer
- Caridad Despaigne
- Inocenta Corvea
- María de los Santos
- María Moret
- Matilde Charro
- Nancy Atiez
- Santa Margarita Skeet
- Sonia de la Paz
- Vicenta Salmón
- Virginia Pérez
- Head coach:
  —

1990 World championship

- Ana Hernández
- Beatriz Perdomo
- Dalia Henry
- Gestrudis Gómez
- Yudith Águila
- Andrea Borrell
- Liset Castillo
- María León
- Odalys Cala
- Olga Vigil
- Regla Hernández
- Yamilet Martínez
- Head coaches:
  Tomas Martínez
  Manuel Pérez

1992 Olympic Games

- Ana Hernández
- Andrea Borrell
- Biosotis Lagnó
- Dalia Henry
- Grisel Herrera
- Yudith Águila
- Liset Castillo
- María León
- Milayda Enríquez
- Olga Vigil
- Regla Hernández
- Yamilé Martínez
- Head coach:
  —

1994 World championship

- Biosotys Lagnó
- Dalia Henry
- Yudith Águila
- Andrea Borrell
- Licet Castillo
- Lisdeivis Víctores
- María León
- Milayda Enríquez
- Olga Vigil
- Regla Hernández
- Tania Seino
- Yamilé Martínez
- Head coach:
  —

1996 Olympic Games

- Tania Seino
- María León
- Yamilé Martínez
- Dalia Henry
- Milayda Enríquez
- Lisdeivis Víctores
- Olga Vigil
- Grisel Herrera
- Biosotis Lagnó
- Yudith Águila
- Cariola Hechavarría
- Gertrudis Gómez
- Head coach:
  —

1998 World championship

- Dalia Henry
- Grisel Herrera
- Yudith Águila
- Licet Castillo
- Lisdeivis Víctores
- Milayda Enríquez
- María León
- Taimara Suero
- Tania Seino
- Yamilé Martínez
- Yadiletsy Ríos
- Yuliseny Soria
- Head coach:
  —

2000 Olympic Games

- Liset Castillo
- Milayda Enríquez
- Cariola Hechavarría
- Dalia Henry
- Grisel Herrera
- María León
- Yamilé Martínez
- Yaquelín Plutín
- Tania Seino
- Yuliseny Soria
- Taimara Suero
- Lisdeivis Víctores
- Head coach:
  —

2002 World championship

- Cariola García
- Yudith Águila
- Liset Castillo
- Zuleira Aties
- María León
- Milayda Parrado
- Milaisis Duanys
- Taimara Suero
- Yaquelín Plutín
- Yamilé Martínez
- Yulzeny Soria
- Lisdeivis Víctores
- Head coach:
  —

2003 Pan American Games

- Yudith Águila
- Suchitel Ávila
- Yayma Boulet
- Ariadna Capiró
- Liset Castillo
- Milaisis Duanys
- Oyanaisis Gelis
- Yamilé Martínez
- Yaquelín Plutín
- Yulianne Rodríguez
- Taimara Suero
- Lisdeivis Víctores
- Head coach:
  —

2006 World championship

- Arlenis Romero
- Taimara Suero
- Yakelyn Plutin
- Oyanaisis Gelis
- Leidys Oquendo
- Yamara Amargo
- Yayma Boulet
- Yamilé Martínez
- Klavdia Calvo
- Yolyseny Soria
- Yulianne Rodríguez
- Suchitel Ávila
- Head coach:
  —

2007 Pan American Games

- Yamara Amargo
- Suchitel Ávila
- Yayma Boulet
- Cariola Hechevarría
- Oyanaisis Gelis
- Yamilé Martínez
- Clenia Noblet
- Leidys Oquendo
- Yakelín Plutín
- Arlenys Romero
- Yolyseny Soria
- Taimara Suero
- Head coach:
  Alberto Zabala

2008 Olympic Qualifying tournament

- Yamara Amargo
- Suchitel Avila
- Yayma Boulet
- Taimy Fernández
- Oyanaisis Gelis
- Marlen Cepeda
- Clenia Noblet
- Leidys Oquendo
- Yakelín Plutín
- Arlenys Romero
- Yolyseny Soria
- Ineidis Casanova
- Head coach:
  Alberto Zabala

== See also ==
- Cuba women's national under-19 basketball team
- Cuba women's national under-17 basketball team
- Cuba women's national 3x3 team
