= Basketball at the 2006 Central American and Caribbean Games =

- Venue: Coliseo Cubierto Base Naval
- Location: Cartagena

Basketball in the 2006 Central American and Caribbean Games took place in the Coliseo Cubierto Base Naval in Cartagena, Colombia from the July 16 to July 22 for women and July 24 to July 30 for men. Each competition had 6 teams.

== Medalist ==
Event	Gold	Silver	Bronze
Men's basketball	Puerto Rico (PUR); Luis Villafane; Filiberto Rivera; Jose Barea; Andres Rodriguez; Gabriel Colon; Alex Falcon; Alejandro Carmona; Hector Valenzuela; Angel Figueroa; David Huertas; Carmelo Lee; Angelo Reyes	Panama (PAN); Abdiel Mendieta; Jair Peralta; Eduado Isaacs; Maximiliano Gomez; Enrique Huie; Daniel King; Dionisio Gomez; Michael Hicks; Jamaal Levy; Antonio Garcia; Jaime Lloreda; Erick Cardenas	Dominican Republic (DOM); Jose Cabrera; Elpidio Fortuna; Cristian Arias; Andy Turner; Otto Ramirez; Franklin Western; Marlon Martinez; Manuel Guzman; Radhames Almontes; Henry Lalane; Jack Martinez
Women's basketball	Cuba (CUB); Arlenys Romero; Yuliseni Soria; Yakelin Plutin; Oyanaisis Gelis; Taimara Suero; Yamara Amargo; Yaima Boulet; Yamilet Martinez; Klavdia Calvo; Leidis Oquendo; Cariola Hechevarria; Suchitel Avila	Puerto Rico (PUR); Zulmarie Sanchez; Pamela Rosado; Aixanell Santos; Cinthia Valentin; Juanita Rivera; Mildred Emmanuelli; Nicolle Davila; Liza Baez; Lindsay Gonzalez; Mary Placido; Esmary Vargas	Colombia (COL); Gleny Mosquera; Erika Valek; Yenni Pinilla; Narlyn Mosquera; Leydis Rico; Liliana Cabezas; Laura Estrada; Yaneth Arias; Heissy Robledo; Levys Torres; Angie Avendano; Elena Diaz

== Men's ==
=== First round ===
Team	Pld	W	L	PF	PA	PD	Pts
Puerto Rico	5	5	0	476	409	+67	10
Panama	5	4	1	471	446	+25	9
Cuba	5	3	2	452	438	+14	8
Dominican Republic	5	2	3	441	426	+15	7
Mexico	5	1	4	418	470	-52	6
Colombia	5	0	5	389	458	-69	5

July 24
14:00

Game 1

Panama	84–74	Dominican Republic
Scoring by quarter: 19-22, 20-14, 20-16, 25-22
Pts: J. Lloreda 21; Rebs: A. García 10; Asts: J. Levy & A. García 2		Pts: M. Martínez 14; Rebs: F. Western 6 Asts: 4 players 1

Coliseo Cubierto Base Naval Cartagena

July 24
16:30

Game 2

Mexico	78–100	Puerto Rico
Scoring by quarter: 19-25, 19-24, 25-30, 15-21
Pts: J. Rochin 19; Rebs: J. Rochin 11; Asts: E. Zuñiga 2		Pts: A. Carmona & C. Lee 18; Rebs: A. Figueroa 11; Asts: F. Rivera 2

Coliseo Cubierto Base Naval Cartagena

July 24
19:00

Game 3

Colombia	83–89	Cuba
Scoring by quarter: 16-22, 19-21, 19-17, 29-29
Pts: S. Ortíz 23; Rebs: A. Teheran 6 Asts: E. Moreno 3		Pts: G. Silvestre 35; Rebs: G. Silvestre 9 Asts: M. Guerra 3

Coliseo Cubierto Base Naval Cartagena

July 25
14:00

Game 4

Panama	93–81	Mexico
Scoring by quarter: 26-23, 23-21, 23-17, 21-20
Pts: M. Hicks 29; Rebs: A. García 5 Asts: M. Hicks & J. Lloreda 2		Pts: E. Zuñiga 23; Rebs: O. Castellanos & H. Llamas 5 Asts: H. Llamas 2

Coliseo Cubierto Base Naval Cartagena

July 25
17:30

Game 5

Puerto Rico	80–76	Cuba
Scoring by quarter: 20-18, 17-16, 20-24, 23-18
Pts: J. Barea 24; Rebs: A. Figueroa 4 Asts: F. Rivera 3		Pts: A. Jemmont & H. Simon 14; Rebs: Y. Luis 7 Asts: G. Elias & O. Torres 1

Coliseo Cubierto Base Naval Cartagena

July 25
19:00

Game 6

Colombia	72–93	Dominican Republic
Scoring by quarter: 15-21, 17-24, 25-30, 15-18
Pts: S. Ortiz 19; Rebs: A. Teheran & H. Asprilla 6		Pts: M. Martinez 23; Rebs: M. Martinez & Y. Martinez 5 Asts: C. Arias 5

Coliseo Cubierto Base Naval Cartagena

July 26
14:00

Game 7

Puerto Rico	102–97 (OT)	Panama
Scoring by quarter: 25-15, 16-18, 28-30, 18-24, Overtime: 15-10
Pts: A. Figueroa 30; Rebs: A. Figueroa 5 Asts: F. Rivera & A. Carmona 1		Pts: M. Hicks 28; Rebs: J. Lloreda 9 Asts: J. Peralta & J. Lloreda 3

Coliseo Cubierto Base Naval Cartagena

July 26
16:30

Game 8

Cuba	86–85	Dominican Republic
Scoring by quarter: 24-19, 14-20, 26-14, 22-32
Pts: M. Guerra 21; Rebs: H. Simon 9 Asts: 5 players 1		Pts: Y. Martínez 22; Rebs: Y. Martínez 6 Asts: Y. Martínez 2

Coliseo Cubierto Base Naval Cartagena

July 26
19:00

Game 9

Colombia	83–86	Mexico
Scoring by quarter: 27-19, 21-20, 17-25, 18-22
Pts: R. Sanz & S. Ortiz 22; Rebs: J. Cañedo 8 Asts: E. Moreno & R. Sanz 1		Pts: H. Llamas 18; Rebs: R. Benitez 10; Asts: H. Llamas 3

Coliseo Cubierto Base Naval Cartagena

July 27
13:30

Game 10

Cuba	110–113 (OT)	Panama
Scoring by quarter: 33-25, 17-26, 25-18, 24-30, Overtime: 11-14
Pts: G. Silvestre 30; Rebs: G. Elias 6 Asts: 3 players 1		Pts: M. Hicks 39; Rebs: A. García & J. Lloreda 8 Asts: J. Peralta 5

Coliseo Cubierto Base Naval Cartagena

July 27
16:30

Game 11

Mexico	96–103	Dominican Republic
Scoring by quarter: 28-16, 29-22, 13-31, 26-34
Pts: O. Castellanos 27; Rebs: V. Avila 6 Asts: H. Llamas 2		Pts: Y. Martínez 26; Rebs: Y. Martínez 14; Asts: C. Arias 5

Coliseo Cubierto Base Naval Cartagena

July 27
19:00

Game 12

Puerto Rico	106–72	Colombia
Scoring by quarter: 26-13, 20-16, 31-16, 29-27
Pts: G. Colon 17; Rebs: D. Huertas 7 Asts: 5 players 1		Pts: S. Ortiz 28; Rebs: E. Moreno 4 Asts: E. Moreno 1

Coliseo Cubierto Base Naval Cartagena

July 28
13:30

Game 13

Cuba	91–77	Mexico
Scoring by quarter: 20-19, 13-23, 31-23, 27-12

Coliseo Cubierto Base Naval Cartagena

July 28
16:30

Game 14

Dominican Republic	85–88	Puerto Rico
Scoring by quarter: 20-22, 16-23, 25-24, 24-19

Coliseo Cubierto Base Naval Cartagena

July 28
19:00

Game 15

Panama	84–79	Colombia
Scoring by quarter: 24-22, 18-15, 28-23, 14-19

Coliseo Cubierto Base Naval Cartagena

=== Semifinals ===
July 29
14:00

Game 16

Puerto Rico	86–77	Dominican Republic
Scoring by quarter: 20-16, 18-18, 25-19, 23-24

Coliseo Cubierto Base Naval Cartagena

July 29
16:30

Game 17

Cuba	79–95	Panama
Scoring by quarter: 14-23, 20-14, 28-26, 17-32

Coliseo Cubierto Base Naval Cartagena

=== Bronze-medal game ===
July 30
11:00

Game 18

Cuba	71–95	Dominican Republic
Scoring by quarter: 22-27, 12-29, 21-15, 16-24

Coliseo Cubierto Base Naval Cartagena

=== Gold-medal game ===
July 30
14:00

Game 19

Puerto Rico	90–87	Panama
Scoring by quarter: 23-23, 28-23, 19-21, 20-20

Coliseo Cubierto Base Naval Cartagena
