= Taimara Suero =

Cuban basketball player

Personal information
- Born: December 21, 1979 (age 46)
Medal record
Women's basketball
Representing Cuba
Pan American Games
Gold medal – first place	2003 Santo Domingo	Team
Bronze medal – third place	2007 Rio de Janeiro	Team
Central American and Caribbean Games
Gold medal – first place	2006 Cartagena	Team

Taimara Suero Coronado (born December 21, 1979, in Havana) is a women's basketball player from Cuba. Playing as a forward, she won the gold medal with the Cuba women's national basketball team at the 2003 Pan American Games in Santo Domingo, Dominican Republic. Suero also competed for her native country at the 2000 Summer Olympics in Sydney, Australia.
