= María León =

María León may refer to:

- María León (basketball) (born 1967), Cuban former basketball player
- María León (actress) (born 1984), Spanish actress
- María León (singer) (born 1986), Mexican singer and actress
- María Teresa León (1903–1988), Spanish writer, activist and cultural ambassador
- María Pilar León (born 1995), Spanish footballer
