= Yayma Boulet =

Cuban basketball player (born 1983)

Personal information
- Born: April 14, 1983 (age 43) Havana, Cuba
- Years active: 2003-2007
- Height: 192 cm (6 ft 4 in)
Medal record
Women's basketball
Representing Cuba
Pan American Games
Gold medal – first place	2003 Santo Domingo	Team
Bronze medal – third place	2007 Rio de Janeiro	Team
Central American and Caribbean Games
Gold medal – first place	2006 Cartagena	Team

Yayma Boulet Peillon (born April 14, 1983, in Havana) is a women's basketball player from Cuba. Playing as a center she twice won a medal with the Cuba women's national basketball team at the Pan American Games during her career.
