= Lisdeivis Víctores =

Cuban basketball player

Personal information
- Born: July 2, 1974 (age 52)
Medal record
Women's basketball
Representing Cuba
Pan American Games
Gold medal – first place	2003 Santo Domingo	Team

Lisdeivis Víctores Pompa (born July 2, 1974, in Havana) is a women's basketball player from Cuba. Playing as a center she won the gold medal with the Cuba women's national basketball team at the 2003 Pan American Games in Santo Domingo, Dominican Republic.

Víctores also competed for her native country at two consecutive Summer Olympics, starting in 1996 (Atlanta, Georgia), finishing in sixth and ninth place in the final rankings.
