= Yaquelín Plutín =

Cuban basketball player

Personal information
- Born: July 9, 1979 (age 46)
Medal record
Women's basketball
Representing Cuba
Pan American Games
Gold medal – first place	2003 Santo Domingo	Team
Bronze medal – third place	2007 Rio de Janeiro	Team

Yaquelín Plutín Tizón (born July 9, 1979, in Majagua, Ciego de Ávila) is a women's basketball player from Cuba. Playing as a center she won the gold medal with the Cuba women's national basketball team at the 2003 Pan American Games in Santo Domingo, Dominican Republic.

Plutin also competed for her native country at the 2000 Summer Olympics in Sydney, Australia, finishing in ninth place in the final rankings. Her first is also spelled as Yakelyn.
