= Yulianne Rodríguez =

Cuban basketball player

Personal information
- Born: 1982 (age 43–44)
Medal record
Women's basketball
Representing Cuba
Pan American Games
Gold medal – first place	2003 Santo Domingo	Team

Yulianne Rodríguez Cruz (born August 12, 1982) is a women's basketball player from Cuba. Playing as a forward she won the gold medal with the Cuba women's national basketball team at the 2003 Pan American Games in Santo Domingo, Dominican Republic. Actualmente juega para el equipo de baloncesto femenino Quetzales Sajoma Club, en la liga professional Mexicana.
