= United States women's national basketball team =

United States
2024 United States women's Olympic basketball team
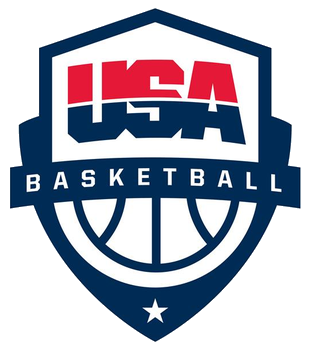
- FIBA ranking: 1 (September 14, 2026)
- FIBA zone: FIBA Americas
- National federation: USA Basketball
- Coach: Kara Lawson
- Nickname(s): Team USA; USBWNT

Olympic Games
- Appearances: 13
- Medals: Gold: (1984, 1988, 1996, 2000, 2004, 2008, 2012, 2016, 2020, 2024); Silver: (1976); Bronze: (1992)

World Cup
- Appearances: 19
- Medals: Gold: (1953, 1957, 1979, 1986, 1990, 1998, 2002, 2010, 2014, 2018, 2022, 2026); Silver: (1983); Bronze: (1994, 2006)

AmeriCup
- Appearances: 9
- Medals: Gold: (1993, 2007, 2019, 2021, 2025); Silver: (1997, 2023)
Home	Away

First international
- Paraguay 28–60 United States (Santiago, Chile; March 8, 1953)

Biggest win
- South Korea 69–145 United States (Sydney, Australia; September 26, 2022)

Biggest defeat
- United States 77–112 Soviet Union (Montreal, Canada; July 23, 1976)
Medal record
Olympic Games
Gold medal – first place	1984 Los Angeles	Team
Gold medal – first place	1988 Seoul	Team
Gold medal – first place	1996 Atlanta	Team
Gold medal – first place	2000 Sydney	Team
Gold medal – first place	2004 Athens	Team
Gold medal – first place	2008 Beijing	Team
Gold medal – first place	2012 London	Team
Gold medal – first place	2016 Rio de Janeiro	Team
Gold medal – first place	2020 Tokyo	Team
Gold medal – first place	2024 Paris	Team
Silver medal – second place	1976 Montreal	Team
Bronze medal – third place	1992 Barcelona	Team
FIBA Women's World Cup
Gold medal – first place	1953 Chile
Gold medal – first place	1957 Brazil
Gold medal – first place	1979 South Korea
Gold medal – first place	1986 Soviet Union
Gold medal – first place	1990 Malaysia
Gold medal – first place	1998 Germany
Gold medal – first place	2002 China
Gold medal – first place	2010 Czech Republic
Gold medal – first place	2014 Turkey
Gold medal – first place	2018 Spain
Gold medal – first place	2022 Australia
Gold medal – first place	2026 Germany
Silver medal – second place	1983 Brazil
Bronze medal – third place	1994 Australia
Bronze medal – third place	2006 Brazil
FIBA Women's AmeriCup
Gold medal – first place	1993 Brazil
Gold medal – first place	2007 Chile
Gold medal – first place	2019 Puerto Rico
Gold medal – first place	2021 Puerto Rico
Gold medal – first place	2025 Chile
Silver medal – second place	1997 Brazil
Silver medal – second place	2023 Mexico

The USA Basketball Women's National Team, commonly known as Team USA, is governed by USA Basketball and competes in FIBA Americas. The team is by far the most successful in international women's basketball, having won 10 out of the 12 Olympic tournaments it has entered. It has also won 10 of the last 13 World Cups (including the last 5), and 12 titles overall. The team is currently ranked first in the FIBA World Rankings.

In 2016, it was named the USA Basketball Team of the Year for a record sixth time (having been previously honored in 1996, 2000, 2004, 2008, and 2012). It was also named the USOC Team of the Year in 1996.

The team is one of the most dominant in all Olympic sports, with a 78–3 record in Olympic play, and a record eight consecutive titles. They have no Olympic losses since 1992, no losses in any global tournament since 2006, and their gold medal in 2024 broke the U.S. men's basketball team's record (1936–1968) for the most consecutive Olympic team victories in all Olympic sports.

== Competitive record ==
=== Olympic Games ===
2026 FIBA Women's Basketball World Cup champion team

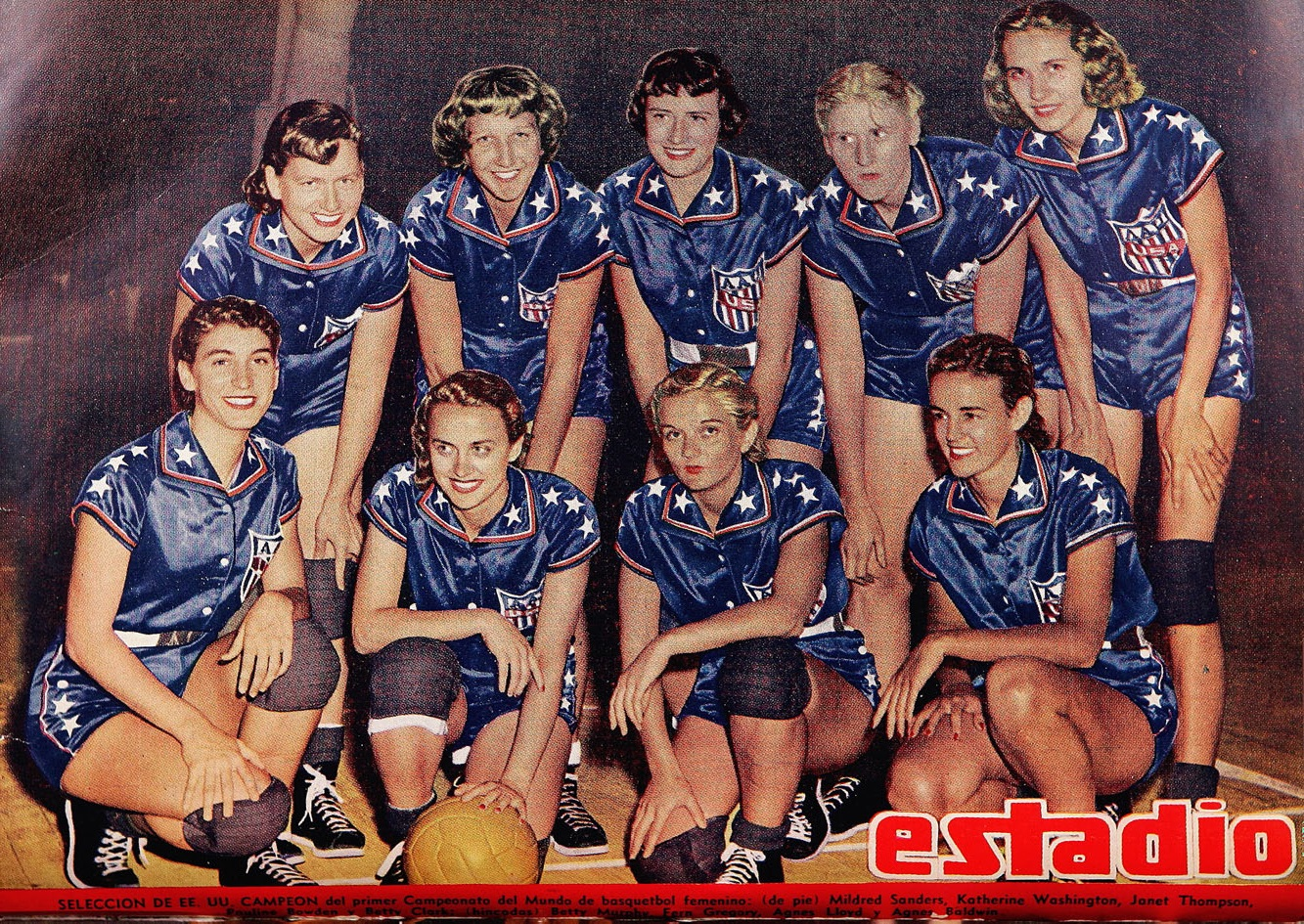
The 1953 team

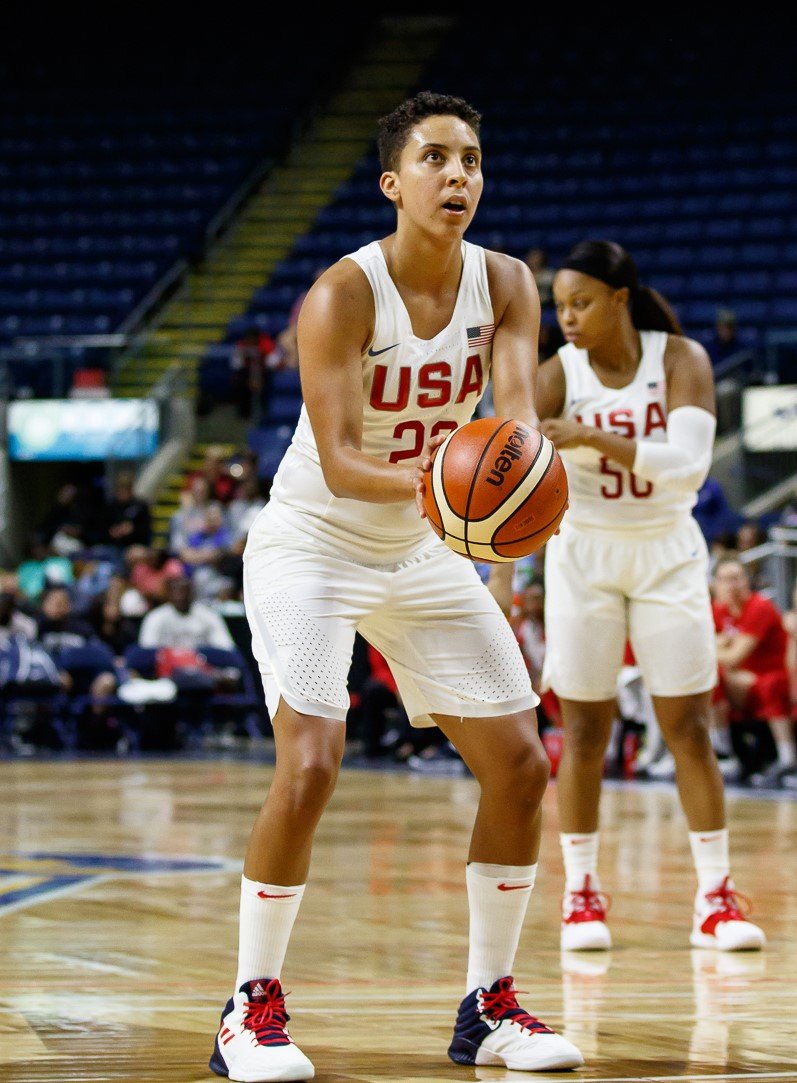
Layshia Clarendon playing for Team USA in an exhibition game before the 2018 World Cup

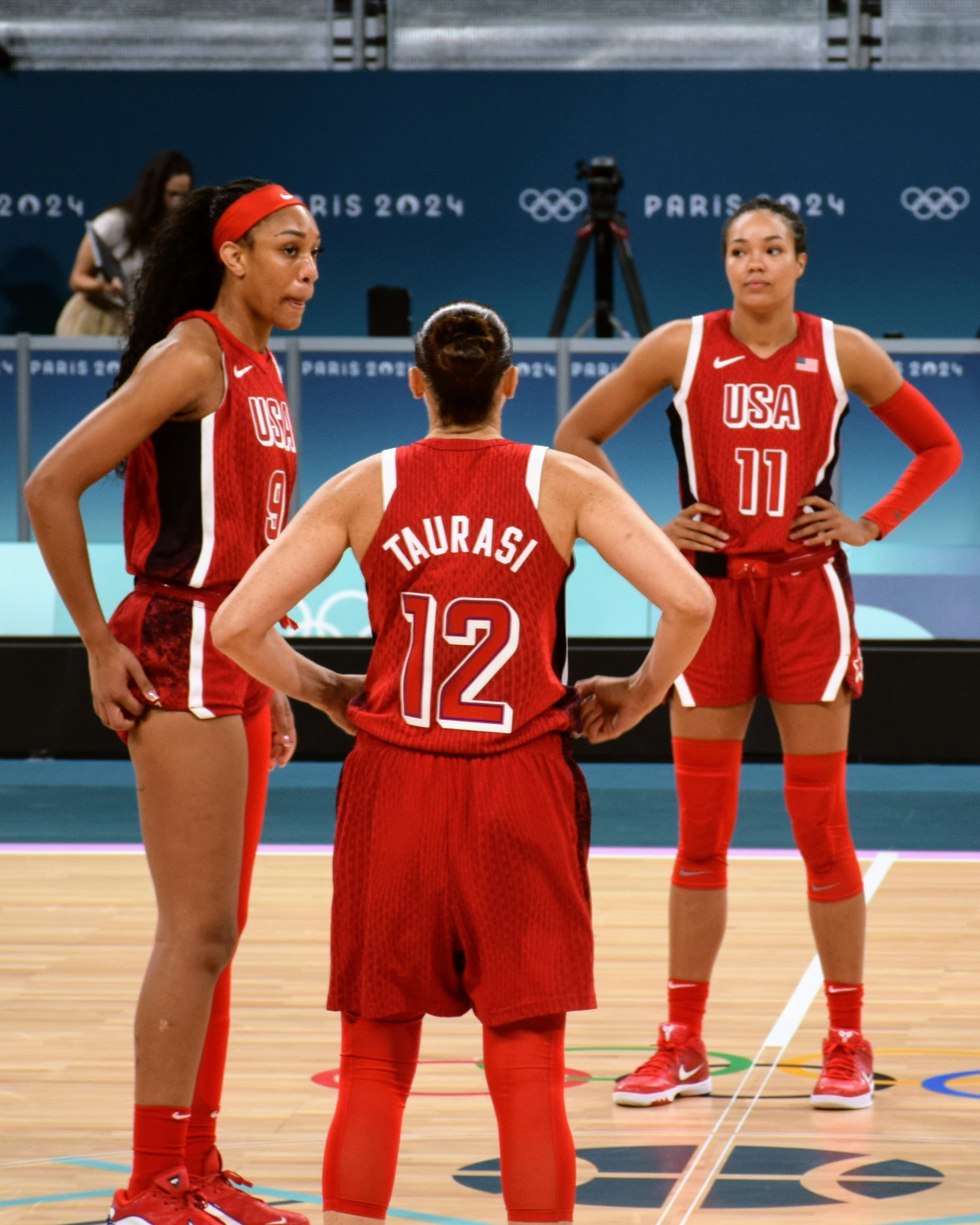
Team USA at the 2024 Summer Olympics

Olympic Games record
Year	Result	Position	Pld	W	L	PF	PA	PD
(Canada) 1976	Silver medalists	2nd of 6	5	3	2	415	417	−2
(Soviet Union) 1980	Withdrew							
(United States) 1984	Gold medalists	1st of 6	6	6	0	516	320	+196
(South Korea) 1988	Gold medalists	1st of 8	5	5	0	461	392	+69
(Spain) 1992	Bronze medalists	3rd of 8	5	4	1	479	334	+145
(United States) 1996	Gold medalists	1st of 12	8	8	0	819	590	+229
(Australia) 2000	Gold medalists	1st of 12	8	8	0	648	474	+174
(Greece) 2004	Gold medalists	1st of 12	8	8	0	672	482	+190
(China) 2008	Gold medalists	1st of 12	8	8	0	754	453	+301
(United Kingdom) 2012	Gold medalists	1st of 12	8	8	0	725	450	+275
(Brazil) 2016	Gold medalists	1st of 12	8	8	0	817	519	+298
(Japan) 2020	Gold medalists	1st of 12	6	6	0	528	412	+116
(France) 2024	Gold medalists	1st of 12	6	6	0	516	422	+94
(United States) 2028	Qualified as host							
Total	10 titles	13/14	81	78	3	7350	5265	+2085

=== FIBA Women's World Cup ===
FIBA Women's World Cup record
Year	Result	Position	Pld	W	L	PF	PA	PD
(Chile) 1953	Champions	1st of 10	6	5	1	248	183	+65
(Brazil) 1957	Champions	1st of 12	9	8	1	555	409	+146
(Soviet Union) 1959	Withdrew							
(Peru) 1964	Fourth place	4th of 13	9	5	4	411	422	−11
(Czechoslovakia) 1967	Preliminary round	11th of 11	6	1	5	251	347	−96
(Brazil) 1971	Preliminary round	8th of 13	8	6	2	534	470	+64
(Colombia) 1975	Preliminary round	8th of 13	7	4	3	540	425	+115
(South Korea) 1979	Champions	1st of 12	6	5	1	463	402	+61
(Brazil) 1983	Runners-up	2nd of 14	8	6	2	731	593	+138
(Soviet Union) 1986	Champions	1st of 12	7	7	0	637	447	+190
(Malaysia) 1990	Champions	1st of 16	8	8	0	729	507	+222
(Australia) 1994	Third place	3rd of 16	8	7	1	793	618	+175
(Germany) 1998	Champions	1st of 16	9	9	0	757	586	+171
(China) 2002	Champions	1st of 16	9	9	0	797	493	+304
(Brazil) 2006	Third place	3rd of 16	9	8	1	774	529	+245
(Czech Republic) 2010	Champions	1st of 16	9	9	0	866	550	+316
(Turkey) 2014	Champions	1st of 16	6	6	0	553	380	+173
(Spain) 2018	Champions	1st of 16	6	6	0	526	404	+122
(Australia) 2022	Champions	1st of 12	8	8	0	790	464	+326
(Germany) 2026	Champions	1st of 16	6	6	0	535	378	+157
(Japan) 2030	To be determined							
Total	12 titles	19/21	144	123	21	11,490	8607	+2883

=== FIBA Women's AmeriCup ===
FIBA Women's AmeriCup record
Year	Result	Position	Pld	W	L	PF	PA	PD
(Brazil) 1989	Fourth place	4th of 8	7	3	4	590	511	+79
(Brazil) 1993	Champions	1st of 8	7	6	1	665	499	+166
(Canada) 1995	Did not participate							
(Brazil) 1997	Runners-up	2nd of 8	6	4	2	553	450	+103
(Cuba) 1999	Did not participate							
(Brazil) 2001	Did not participate							
(Mexico) 2003	Did not participate							
(Dominican Republic) 2005	Did not participate							
(Chile) 2007	Champions	1st of 8	5	5	0	490	287	+203
(Brazil) 2009	Did not participate							
(Colombia) 2011	Did not participate							
(Mexico) 2013	Did not participate							
(Canada) 2015	Did not participate							
(Argentina) 2017	Did not participate							
(Puerto Rico) 2019	Champions	1st of 10	6	6	0	532	300	+232
(Puerto Rico) 2021	Champions	1st of 9	6	6	0	533	322	+211
(Mexico) 2023	Runners-up	2nd of 8	7	5	2	498	402	+96
(Chile) 2025	Champions	1st of 10	7	7	0	639	381	+258
(El Salvador) 2027	Qualified							
(Nicaragua) 2029	Qualified							
Total	5 titles	9/19	51	42	9	4500	3152	+1348

== Team ==
=== Current roster ===
Roster for the 2026 FIBA Women's Basketball World Cup.

United States women's national basketball team roster
Players
Coaches

Pos.	No.	Name	Age – Date of birth	Height	Club	Ctr.
G	4	Paige Bueckers	24 – 20 October 2001	1.83 m (6 ft 0 in)	Dallas Wings	(United States)
G	5	Sonia Citron	22 – 22 October 2003	1.85 m (6 ft 1 in)	Washington Mystics	(United States)
G	6	Rhyne Howard	26 – 29 April 2000	1.88 m (6 ft 2 in)	Atlanta Dream	(United States)
G	7	Kahleah Copper	32 – 28 August 1994	1.85 m (6 ft 1 in)	Phoenix Mercury	(United States)
G	8	Chelsea Gray	33 – 8 October 1992	1.80 m (5 ft 11 in)	Las Vegas Aces	(United States)
F	9	Kiki Iriafen	23 – 26 August 2003	1.91 m (6 ft 3 in)	Washington Mystics	(United States)
PF	10	Breanna Stewart (C)	32 – 27 August 1994	1.91 m (6 ft 3 in)	New York Liberty	(United States)
SF	11	Napheesa Collier	29 – 23 September 1996	1.86 m (6 ft 1 in)	Minnesota Lynx	(United States)
G	12	Caitlin Clark	24 – 22 January 2002	1.83 m (6 ft 0 in)	Indiana Fever	(United States)
G	13	Jackie Young	28 – 16 September 1997	1.83 m (6 ft 0 in)	Las Vegas Aces	(United States)
F	14	Aliyah Boston	24 – 11 December 2001	1.93 m (6 ft 4 in)	Indiana Fever	(United States)
F	15	Angel Reese	24 – 6 May 2002	1.90 m (6 ft 3 in)	Atlanta Dream	(United States)

Head coach

- (United States) Kara Lawson

Assistant coach(es)

- (United States) Jose Fernandez
- (United States) Natalie Nakase
- (United States) Nate Tibbetts
- (United States) Stephanie White

Legend

- (C) Team captain
- Club – describes last
  club before the tournament
- Age – describes age
  on 4 September 2026

=== Past rosters ===
Olympic Games

- 1976 Summer Olympics
- 1984 Summer Olympics
- 1988 Summer Olympics
- 1992 Summer Olympics
- 1996 Summer Olympics
- 2000 Summer Olympics
- 2004 Summer Olympics
- 2008 Summer Olympics
- 2012 Summer Olympics
- 2016 Summer Olympics
- 2020 Summer Olympics
- 2024 Summer Olympics

FIBA World Cup

- 1953 FIBA World Championship
- 1957 FIBA World Championship
- 1964 FIBA World Championship
- 1967 FIBA World Championship
- 1971 FIBA World Championship
- 1975 FIBA World Championship
- 1979 FIBA World Championship
- 1983 FIBA World Championship
- 1986 FIBA World Championship
- 1990 FIBA World Championship
- 1994 FIBA World Championship
- 1998 FIBA World Championship
- 2002 FIBA World Championship
- 2006 FIBA World Championship
- 2010 FIBA World Championship
- 2014 FIBA World Championship
- 2018 FIBA World Cup
- 2022 FIBA World Cup
- 2026 FIBA World Cup

== Records ==
=== Olympic Games ===
==== Players medal leaders ====
Player	United States career	Gold	Silver	Bronze	Total (min. 3 medals)
Diana Taurasi	2004–2024				6
Sue Bird	2004–2020				5
Teresa Edwards	1984–2000				5
Lisa Leslie	1996–2008				4
Tamika Catchings	2004–2016				4
Sylvia Fowles	2008–2020				4
Sheryl Swoopes	1996–2004				3
Dawn Staley	1996–2004				3
Katie Smith	2000–2008				3
Seimone Augustus	2008–2016				3
Tina Charles	2012–2020				3
Brittney Griner	2016–2024				3
Breanna Stewart	2016–2024				3
Katrina McClain	1988–1996				3

==== Coaching staff ====
===== List of head coaches =====
- Billie Moore (1975 PAG, 1976 Oly)
- Pat Summitt (1979 PAG, 1979 WC, 1979 JC, 1983 WC, 1984 Oly, 1984 JC)
- Kay Yow (1981 WUG, 1986 Good, 1986 WC, 1988 Oly)
- Theresa Grentz (1985 JC, 1990 Good, 1990 WC, 1992 Oly)
- Tara VanDerveer (1991 WUG, 1994 Good, 1994 WC, 1996 Oly)
- Nell Fortner (1998 JC, 1998 WC, 1999 PAG, 2000 Oly)
- Van Chancellor (2002 WC, 2004 Oly)
- Anne Donovan (2006 WC, 2008 Oly)
- Geno Auriemma (2010 WC, 2012 Oly, 2014 WC, 2016 Oly)
- Dawn Staley (2007 PAG, 2018 WC, 2019 Amer, 2021 Amer, 2021 Oly)
- Cheryl Reeve (2022 WC, 2024 Oly)

===== Olympic records =====
Manager	United States career	Coached	Won	Lost	Win %	Honors
Cheryl Reeve	2024	6	6	0	100	Gold medal: Olympic Games 2024
Dawn Staley	2020	6	6	0	100	Gold medal: Olympic Games 2020
Geno Auriemma	2012, 2016	16	16	0	100	2 Gold medals: Olympic Games (2012, 2016)
Tara VanDerveer	1996	8	8	0	100	Gold medal: Olympic Games 1996
Nell Fortner	2000	8	8	0	100	Gold medal: Olympic Games 2000
Van Chancellor	2004	8	8	0	100	Gold medal: Olympic Games 2004
Anne Donovan	2008	8	8	0	100	Gold medal: Olympic Games 2008
Pat Summitt	1984	6	6	0	100	Gold medal: Olympic Games 1984
Kay Yow	1988	5	5	0	100	Gold medal: Olympic Games 1988
Billie Moore	1976	5	3	2	60	Silver medal: Olympic Games 1976
Theresa Grentz	1992	5	4	1	80	Bronze medal: Olympic Games 1992

==== Statistics ====
===== Games =====
Rank	Name	NT career	Games
1	Diana Taurasi	2004–2024	38
2	Sue Bird	2004–2020	36
3	Lisa Leslie	1996–2008	32
3	Tamika Catchings	2004–2016	32
3	Teresa Edwards	1984–2000	32
4	Sylvia Fowles	2008–2020	27
5	Dawn Staley	1996–2004	24
5	Sheryl Swoopes	1996–2004	24

===== Points =====
Rank	Name	NT career	Total points
1	Lisa Leslie	1996–2008	488
2	Diana Taurasi	2004–2024	414
3	Sheryl Swoopes	1996–2004	274
4	Teresa Edwards	1984–2000	265
5	Katrina McClain	1988–1996	258
6	Sylvia Fowles	2008–2020	240
7	Tina Thompson	2004–2008	215
8	Tina Charles	2012–2020	188
9	Tamika Catchings	2004–2016	184
10	Seimone Augustus	2008–2016	179

===== Highest field goal percentage =====
Rank	Name	Highest field goal percentage
1	Carol Menken-Schaudt	.786 (11–14)
2	Cindy Noble	.724 (21–29)
3	Brittney Griner	.690 (78–113)
4	Medina Dixon	.673 (35–42)
5	Ruth Riley	.667 (10–15)
6	Cheryl Miller	.661 (37–56)
7	Kara Lawson	.656 (21–32)
8	Sylvia Fowles	.651 (97–149)
9	Yolanda Griffith	.649 (63- 97)

===== Highest 3-point field goal percentage =====
Rank	Name	Highest 3-point field goal percentage
1	Kara Lawson	.571 (8–14)
2	Napheesa Collier	.500 (1–2)
3	Clarissa Davis	.467 (7–15)
4	Cynthia Cooper	.462 (6–13)
5	Diana Taurasi	.448 (78–174)
6	Cappie Pondexter	.444 (4–9)
7	Chelsea Gray	.429 (3–7)
8	Katie Smith	.421 (16–38)
9	Suzie McConnell	.385 (10–26)
10	Tina Thompson	.375 (15–40)
10	Breanna Stewart	.375 (12–32)
10	Tina Charles	.375 (3–8)
10	Carolyn Jones	.375 (3–8)

3-point field goals have been kept as an official statistic since the 1988 Olympics.

===== Highest free throw percentage =====
Rank	Name	Highest free throw percentage
1	Juliene Simpson	1.000 (16–16)
2	Vicky Bullett	1.000 (10–10)
3	Shannon Johnson	1.000 (9–9)
4	Ariel Atkins	1.000 (4–4)
5	Napheesa Collier	1.000 (2–2)
6	Andrea Lloyd	.917 (11–12)
7	Diana Taurasi	.909 (60–66)
8	Ann Meyers	.909 (10–11)
9	Cindy Brogdon	.900 (9–10)
10	Dawn Staley	.886 (39–44)

===== Rebounds =====
Rank	Name	Rebounds
1	Lisa Leslie	241
2	Katrina McClain	166
3	Sylvia Fowles	155
4	Tamika Catchings	137
5	Yolanda Griffith	123
6	Diana Taurasi	115
7	Tina Charles	114
8	Candace Parker	98
9	Sheryl Swoopes	97
10	Maya Moore	90

===== Assists =====
Rank	Name	Assists
1	Teresa Edwards	143
2	Sue Bird	124
3	Diana Taurasi	97
4	Dawn Staley	80
5	Sheryl Swoopes	68
6	Maya Moore	55
7	Lindsay Whalen	54
8	Tina Charles	49
9	Seimone Augustus	48
10	Lisa Leslie	45

===== Steals =====
Rank	Name	Steals
1	Teresa Edwards	59
2	Tamika Catchings	56
3	Katrina McClain	40
4	Sheryl Swoopes	39
5	Suzie McConnell	38
6	Lisa Leslie	34
7	Sue Bird	33
8	Ruthie Bolton	31
8	Diana Taurasi	31
10	Maya Moore	28
10	Dawn Staley	28

Steals have been kept as an official statistic since the 1984 Olympics.

===== Blocks =====
Rank	Name	Blocks
1	Lisa Leslie	37
2	Brittney Griner	20
3	Candace Parker	14
3	Breanna Stewart	14
5	Anne Donovan	13
5	Katrina McClain	13
5	Tamika Catchings	13
5	Sylvia Fowles	13

Blocks have been kept as an official statistic since the 1984 Olympics.

===== Most points averaged =====
Rank	Name	NT career	Total points	PPG
1	Cheryl Miller	1984	99	16.5
1	A'ja Wilson	2020	99	16.5
3	Medina Dixon	1992	79	15.8
4	Lisa Leslie	1996–2008	488	15.3
5	Lusia Harris	1976	76	15.2
6	Katrina McClain	1988–1996	258	14.3

===== Players records for a game =====
Statistic	Record	Player	Opponent	Date
Points	35	Lisa Leslie	Japan	7/31/96
Field goals made	16	Lisa Leslie	Japan	7/31/96
Field goals attempted	23	Katrina McClain	Soviet Union	9/27/88
Field goal percentage	1.000 (8–8)	Angel McCoughtry	China	8/05/12
3-point field goals made	6	Diana Taurasi	Serbia	8/10/16
3-point field goal attempts	10	Diana Taurasi	Serbia	8/10/16
3-point field goal percentage	1.000 (3–3)	Cynthia Cooper	Yugoslavia	9/22/88
Free throws made	10	Angel McCoughtry	Turkey	8/01/12
Free throw attempts	13	Cynthia Cooper	Soviet Union	9/27/88
Free throw percentage	1.000 (8–8)	Juliene Simpson	Canada	7/22/76
Rebounds	16	Katrina McClain	Unified Team	8/05/92
Assists	15	Teresa Edwards	Australia	7/27/96
Blocks	4	Candace Parker	Angola	7/30/12
Steals	9	Suzie McConnell	Unified Team	8/05/92

===== Team records (in a game) =====
Statistic	Record	Opponent	Date
Biggest margin of victory	65	Senegal	8/07/16
Biggest margin of defeat	35	Soviet Union	7/23/76
Most points scored	121	Senegal	8/07/16
Most rebounds	62	Czech Republic	8/03/12
Most field goals made	52	China	8/05/12
Most field goal attempts	90	China	8/01/92
Highest field goal percentage	.662 (43–65)	Brazil	8/04/96
Most 3-pointers made	11	Japan	8/16/16
Most 3-pointer attempts	25	Greece	8/25/04
Highest 3-point field goal percentage	.636 (7–11)	South Korea	9/16/00
Most free throws made	32	Yugoslavia	9/22/88
Most free throw attempts	40	Yugoslavia	9/22/88
Highest free throw percentage	1.000 (26–26)	Serbia	8/10/16
Most assists	40	China	8/14/16
Most blocks	11	Angola	7/30/12
Most steals	40	Czechoslovakia	7/30/92

==== All-time results ====
Opponents	Played	Won	Lost	% Won	Biggest victory	Biggest defeat
Angola	1	1	0	100%	+52 (90:38)	–
Australia	7	7	0	100%	+34 (81:47)	–
Brazil	1	1	0	100%	+24 (111:87)	–
Bulgaria	1	1	0	100%	+16 (95:79)	–
Canada	4	4	0	100%	+43 (91:48)	–
China	7	7	0	100%	+48 (114:66)	–
Croatia	1	1	0	100%	+25 (81:56)	–
Cuba	3	3	0	100%	+29 (90:61)	–
Czechoslovakia	3	3	0	100%	+60 (115:55)	–
Czech Republic	3	3	0	100%	+40 (97:57)	–
France	2	2	0	100%	+36 (86:50)	–
Greece	1	1	0	100%	+30 (102:72)	–
Japan	3	2	1	66.6%	+46 (110:64)	−13 (71:84)
Mali	1	1	0	100%	+56 (97:41)	–
New Zealand	3	3	0	100%	+52 (99:47)	–
Poland	1	1	0	100%	+19 (76:57)	–
Russia	3	3	0	100%	+15 (67:52)	–
Senegal	1	1	0	100%	+65 (121:56)	–
Serbia	1	1	0	100%	+26 (110:84)	–
Slovakia	1	1	0	100%	+15 (58:43)	–
South Korea	7	7	0	100%	+54 (104:50)	–
Soviet Union	2	1	1	50%	+14 (102:88)	−35 (77:112)
Spain	5	5	0	100%	+55 (114:59)	–
Turkey	1	1	0	100%	+31 (89:58)	–
Ukraine	1	1	0	100%	+33 (98:65)	–
Unified Team	1	0	1	0%	–	−6 (73:79)
Yugoslavia	3	3	0	100%	+28 (83:55)	–
Zaire	1	1	0	100%	+60 (107:47)	–
Total	69	66	3	95.66%		

=== Women's World Cup ===
==== All-time results ====
Opponents	Played	Won	Lost	% Won	Biggest victory	Biggest defeat
Angola	1	1	0	100%	+75 (119:44)	–
Argentina	3	3	0	100%	+25 (64:39)	–
Australia	10	10	0	100%	+18 (88:70)	–
Belarus	1	1	0	100%	+46 (107:61)	–
Brazil	9	6	3	66.6%	+40 (99:59)	−12 (44:56)
Bulgaria	5	2	3	40%	+22 (99:77)	−28 (40:68)
Canada	7	6	1	85.7%	+41 (87:46)	−6 (68:74)
Chile	2	2	0	100%	+29 (76:47)	–
China	5	5	0	100%	+47 (119:72)	–
Total	43	36	7	83.72%		

== See also ==
- United States women's national under-19 basketball team
- United States women's national under-17 basketball team
- United States women's Pan American basketball team
- United States women's World University Games basketball team
- United States women's William Jones Cup basketball team
- United States women's national 3x3 team
- Timeline of women's basketball
- United States men's national basketball team
- United States men's national under-19 basketball team
- United States men's national under-17 basketball team
- USA Basketball
- Basketball in the United States
