= Milaisis Duanys =

Cuban basketball player

Personal information
- Born: November 18, 1979 (age 46)
Medal record
Women's basketball
Representing Cuba
Pan American Games
Gold medal – first place	2003 Santo Domingo	Team

Milaisis Duanys Céspedes (born November 18, 1979, in Santiago de Cuba) is a women's basketball player from Cuba. Playing as a forward she won the gold medal with the Cuba women's national basketball team at the 2003 Pan American Games in the Dominican Republic. Her first name is sometimes also spelled as Milaisy.
