= Franklin Western =

Dominican Republic basketball player

Personal information
- Born: April 11, 1972 (age 54)
Medal record
Men's basketball
Representing the Dominican Republic
Pan American Games
Silver medal – second place	2003 Dominican Republic
Centrobasket
Silver medal – second place	2003 Mexico
Bronze medal – third place	2008 Mexico
Silver medal – second place	2010 Dominican Republic
Central American and Caribbean Games
Bronze medal – third place	2006 Colombia
FIBA CBC Championship
Silver medal – second place	2007 Puerto Rico

Franklin Western Canales (born April 11, 1972, in New York City, New York) is a former professional basketball player. He is 2.00 m tall and played as a forward. Western was a member of the Dominican Republic national basketball team.

== Sports career ==
=== University ===
Western played four seasons with the Providence College Friars. In his first season in 1990–91, Western played in 18 games averaging 2.4 points and 1.2 rebounds per game. He sat out the 1991–92 season. The following season, he played in 22 games averaging 7.5 points and 2.3 rebounds per game. In the 1993–94 season, he played in 20 games (16 starts) increasing his production to 12.8 points and 3.7 rebounds per game, and in his final season in 1994–95, he played in 29 games (24 starts), averaging 9.9 points and 3.9 rebounds per game.
