= Miroslav Vondřička =

Czech women's basketball coach (1933–2025)

Miroslav Vondřička (29 May 1933 – 18 December 2025) was a Czech basketball coach and veterinarian.

== Biography ==
Vondřička was born in Bratislava on 29 May 1933.

Vondřička led the Czechoslovakia women's national team during the 1992 Olympic Games in Barcelona, the 1990 World Championships and two editions of the European Championships (1989, 1991).

He also coached the Czech Republic women's national team at the 1995 European Championships.

Vondřička died on 18 December 2025, at the age of 92.
