= Yudith Águila =

Cuban basketball player (born 1972)

Personal information
- Born: October 6, 1972 (age 53) Havana
Medal record
Women's basketball
Representing Cuba
Pan American Games
Gold medal – first place	2003 Santo Domingo	Team

Yudith Águila Hernández (born October 6, 1972 in Havana) is a women's basketball player from Cuba. Playing as a center she won the gold medal with the Cuba women's national basketball team at the 2003 Pan American Games in Santo Domingo, Dominican Republic.

Aguila also competed for her native country at two consecutive Summer Olympics, starting in 1992 (Barcelona, Spain), finishing in fourth and sixth place in the final rankings. Her first name is sometimes also spelled as Judith.
