= Basketball at the 1992 Summer Olympics =

13th Olympic Basketball Tournament
- Barcelona 1992

Tournament details
- Olympics: 1992 Summer Olympics
- Host nation: Spain
- City: Barcelona
- Duration: 26 July – 8 August

Men's tournament
- Teams: 12
Medals
Gold medalists	United States
Silver medalists	Croatia
Bronze medalists	Lithuania

Women's tournament
- Teams: 8
Medals
Gold medalists	CIS
Silver medalists	China
Bronze medalists	United States

Tournaments
← Seoul 1988	Atlanta 1996 →

Basketball at the 1992 Summer Olympics was the thirteenth appearance of the sport of basketball as an official Olympic medal event. It included the sport of basketball's men's and women's competitions of the 1992 Summer Olympics. The games were played at the Pavelló Olímpic de Badalona. 12 men's teams and 8 women's teams participated in the tournament.

This was the first time that NBA players were eligible to play in Summer Olympics basketball, following a decision of FIBA in April 1989. Until 1992, only amateurs and players from professional leagues other than the NBA were allowed to play.

The United States men's team, which was nicknamed "The Dream Team", won the gold medal in the men's tournament by beating Croatia in the final, with Lithuania winning the bronze medal. A documentary film, The Other Dream Team, covered the progress of the Lithuanian team.

The Unified Team, representing the Commonwealth of Independent States of the recently defunct Soviet Union, won the women's tournament, with China as runner-up. The United States women's team won the bronze medal after losing to the CIS in the semifinal, suffering their third and last defeat to date in the Olympic basketball history.

The men's top scorer was Oscar Schmidt with 198 points in 8 games, with an average of 24.7 points, and Drazen Petrovic was second with 187 points in 7 games, with an average of 26.7 points.

== Medal summary ==
Event	Gold	Silver	Bronze
Men's	United States; Christian Laettner; David Robinson; Patrick Ewing; Larry Bird; Scottie Pippen; Michael Jordan; Clyde Drexler; Karl Malone; John Stockton; Chris Mullin; Charles Barkley; Earvin "Magic" Johnson, Jr.	Croatia; Dražen Petrović; Velimir Perasović; Danko Cvjetičanin; Toni Kukoč; Vladan Alanović; Franjo Arapović; Žan Tabak; Stojko Vranković; Alan Gregov; Arijan Komazec; Dino Rađa; Aramis Naglić	Lithuania; Valdemaras Chomičius; Alvydas Pazdrazdis; Arūnas Visockas; Darius Dimavičius; Romanas Brazdauskis; Gintaras Krapikas; Rimas Kurtinaitis; Arvydas Sabonis; Artūras Karnišovas; Šarūnas Marčiulionis; Gintaras Einikis; Sergejus Jovaiša
Women's	Unified Team; Yelena Zhirko; Yelena Baranova; Irina Guerlits; Yelena Tornikidu; Yelena Shvaybovich; Marina Tkachenko; Irina Minkh; Yelena Khudashova; Irina Soumnikova; Elen Bounatiants; Natalia Zasulskaya; Svetlana Zaboluyeva	China; Cong Xuedi; He Jun; Li Dongmei; Li Xin; Liu Jun; Liu Qing; Peng Ping; Wang Fang; Zhan Shuping; Zheng Dongmei; Zheng Haixia; Zheng Xiulin	United States; Teresa Edwards; Daedra Charles; Clarissa Davis; Teresa Weatherspoon; Tammy Jackson; Vickie Orr; Victoria Bullett; Carolyn Jones; Katrina Felicia McClain; Medina Dixon; Cynthia Cooper; Suzanne McConnell

== Qualification ==
An NOC may enter up to one men's team with 12 players and up to one women's team with 12 players. For the men's tournament, the host country qualified automatically, as did the winners of the continental championships held for Asia, Oceania, Africa and the Americas, plus the runner-up, third and fourth place from the Americas competitions. A special qualifying tournament was held for European teams to allocate four extra berths. For the women's tournament, the host team qualified automatically, as did the top three teams from the 1990 FIBA World Championship. A qualifying tournament was held to allocate four extra berths. Yugoslavia was replaced by Italy (the fifth place team from the qualifying tournament) after it was excluded from the Olympic tournament.

=== Men ===
Africa	Americas	Asia	Europe	Oceania	Automatic qualifiers
Angola	United States; Venezuela; Brazil; Puerto Rico	China	Lithuania; Croatia; CIS; Germany	Australia	Spain – Olympic hosts

=== Women ===
Americas	Asia	Europe	Automatic qualifiers
United States; Cuba; Brazil	China	Italy^{[a]} CIS; Czechoslovakia	Spain – Olympic hosts

- ^{a} Replaced Yugoslavia.

== Format ==
Men's tournament:

- Two groups of six teams are formed, where the top four from each group advance to the knockout stage.
- Fifth and sixth places from each group form an additional bracket to decide 9th through 12th places in the final ranking.
- In the quarterfinals, the pairings are as follows: A1 vs. B4, A2 vs. B3, A3 vs. B2 and A4 vs. B1.
  - The four teams eliminated from the quarterfinals form an additional bracket to decide 5th through 8th places in the final ranking.
- The winning teams from the quarterfinals meet in the semifinals.
- The winning teams from the semifinals contest the gold medal. The losing teams contest the bronze.

Women's tournament:

- Two groups of four teams are formed, where the top two from each group advance to the knockout stage.
- Third and fourth places from each group form an additional bracket to decide 5th–8th places in the final ranking.
- The winning teams from the semifinals contest the gold medal. The losing teams contest the bronze.

Tie-breaking criteria:

1. Head to head results

== Men's tournament ==
=== Preliminary round ===
The top four places in each of the preliminary round groups advanced to the eight team, single-elimination knockout stage, where Group A teams would meet Group B teams.

==== Group A ====
Qualified for the quarterfinals

Team	W	L	PF	PA	PD	Pts	Tie
United States	5	0	579	350	+229	10	
Croatia	4	1	423	400	+23	9	
Brazil	2	3	420	463	−43	7	1–0
Germany	2	3	369	432	−63	7	0–1
Angola	1	4	324	392	−68	6	1–0
Spain	1	4	398	476	−78	6	0–1

DAY 1

USA 116-48 Angola

Croatia 96-73 Brazil

Germany 83-74 Spain

Day 2

USA 103-70 Croatia

Spain 101-100 Brazil

Germany 64-63 Angola

Day 3

USA 111-68 Germany

Croatia 88-79 Spain

Angola 66-76 Brazil

Day 4

USA 127-83 Brazil

Croatia 98-74 Germany

Spain 63-83 Angola

Day 5

USA 122-81 Spain

Croatia 73-64 Angola

Germany 76-85 Brazil

==== Group B ====
Qualified for the quarterfinals

Team	W	L	PF	PA	PD	Pts	Tie
CIS	4	1	425	373	+52	9	1–0
Lithuania	4	1	481	424	+57	9	0–1
Australia	3	2	432	396	+36	8	1–0
Puerto Rico	3	2	445	440	+15	8	0–1
Venezuela	1	4	392	427	−35	6	
China	0	5	381	496	−115	5	

Day 1

CIS 78-64 Venezuela

Lithuania 112-75 China

Puerto Rico 76-116 Australia

Day 2

CIS 85-63 Australia

Puerto Rico 100-68 China

Venezuela 79-87 Lithuania

Day 3

CIS 100-84 China

Australia 78-71 Venezuela

Lithuania 104-91 Puerto Rico.

Day 4

CIS 92-80 Lithuania

Australia 88-66 China

Puerto Rico 96-82 Venezuela

Day 5

CIS 70-82 Puerto Rico

Venezuela 96-88 China

Lithuania 98-87 Australia

=== Knockout stage ===
Quarterfinals
A1	United States	115
B4	Puerto Rico	77
B2	Lithuania	114
A3	Brazil	96
B1	CIS	83
A4	Germany	76
A2	Croatia	98
B3	Australia	65

Semifinals
A1	United States	127
B2	Lithuania	76
B1	CIS	74
A2	Croatia	75

Gold medal game
A1	United States	117
A2	Croatia	85
Bronze medal game
B1	CIS	78
B2	Lithuania	82

=== Statistical leaders ===
Statistic	Name	Total	Per game/Pct.
Points	(Brazil) Oscar Schmidt	198	24.8
Rebounds	(Lithuania) Arvydas Sabonis	100	12.5
Assists	(Lithuania) Šarūnas Marčiulionis	66	8.2
Steals	(United States) Michael Jordan	33	4.1
Steals	(Commonwealth of Independent States) Igors Miglinieks	33	4.1
Blocks	(Lithuania) Arvydas Sabonis	22	2.8
3-point field goals	(Brazil) Oscar Schmidt	28	.378
Free throws	(Lithuania) Šarūnas Marčiulionis	75	.765

== Women's tournament ==
=== Preliminary round ===
The best two teams from each group advanced to the semifinals. The United States and Cuba advanced undefeated through the group phase but couldn't reach the finals and ended up facing each other for the bronze medal instead.

==== Group A ====
Qualified for the semifinals

Team	W	L	PF	PA	PD	Pts
Cuba	3	0	246	229	+17	6
CIS	2	1	242	222	+20	5
Brazil	1	2	236	241	−5	4
Italy	0	3	190	222	−32	3

Day 1

Cuba 91-89 CIS

Brazil 85-70 Italy

Day 2

CIS 77-67 Italy

Cuba 95-87 Brazil

Day 3

CIS 76-64 Brazil

Cuba 60-53 Italy

==== Group B ====
Qualified for the semifinals

Team	W	L	PF	PA	PD	Pts
United States	3	0	318	174	+144	6
China	2	1	199	226	−27	5
Spain	1	2	180	238	−58	4
Czechoslovakia	0	3	183	242	−59	3

Day 1

USA 111-55 Czechoslovakia

China 66-63 Spain

Day 2

Spain 59-58 Czechoslovakia

USA 93-61 China

Day 3

China 72-70 Czechoslovakia

USA 114-58 Spain

=== Knockout stage ===
Semifinals
B1	United States	73
A2	CIS	79
A1	Cuba	70
B2	China	109

Finals
A2	CIS	76
B2	China	66
Third place
B1	United States	88
A1	Cuba	74

=== Statistical leaders ===
Statistic	Name	Total	Per game/Pct.
Points	(Brazil) Hortência Marcari	94	18.8
Rebounds	(United States) Katrina McClain	48	9.6
Assists	(United States) Teresa Edwards	27	4.5
Steals	(Czechoslovakia) Iveta Bieliková	27	5.4
Blocks	(Spain) Elisabeth Cebrián	9	1.8
3-point field goals	(China) Cong Xuedi	15	.577
Free throws	(Commonwealth of Independent States) Natalya Zasulskaya	27	.659

== Final standings ==
Rank	Men			Women		
Rank	Team	W	L	Team	W	L
1st place, gold medalist(s)	United States	8	0	CIS	4	1
2nd place, silver medalist(s)	Croatia	6	2	China	3	2
3rd place, bronze medalist(s)	Lithuania	6	2	United States	4	1
4th	CIS	5	3	Cuba	3	2
Eliminated at the quarterfinals				Eliminated at the preliminary round		
5th	Brazil	4	4	Spain	3	2
6th	Australia	4	4	Czechoslovakia	1	4
7th	Germany	3	5	Brazil	2	3
8th	Puerto Rico	3	5	Italy	0	5
Eliminated at the preliminary round
9th	Spain	3	4			
10th	Angola	2	5			
11th	Venezuela	2	5			
12th	China	0	7			

== See also ==
- "The Dream Team"
