= Stefania Salvemini =

Italian basketball player (born 1966)

Personal information
- Nationality: Italian
- Born: 24 October 1966 (age 58); San Giovanni Rotondo, Italy

Sport
- Sport: Basketball

Stefania Salvemini (born 24 October 1966) is an Italian former basketball player. She competed in the women's tournament at the 1992 Summer Olympics.
