= Zheng Xiulin =

Chinese basketball player

Medal record

Women's basketball

Representing China

Olympic Games
Silver medal – second place	1992 Barcelona	Team competition

Zheng Xiulin (simplified Chinese: 郑秀琳; traditional Chinese: 鄭秀琳; pinyin: Zhèng Xiùlín; born 21 July 1966) is a Chinese former basketball player who competed in the 1992 Summer Olympics.
