= Arlenys Romero =

Cuban basketball player

Pinar del Río
- Position: Guard
- League: LSB

Personal information
- Born: February 7, 1984 (age 42)
- Listed height: 5 ft 9 in (1.75 m)
Medals
Women's basketball
Representing Cuba
Pan American Games
| Bronze medal – third place | 2015 Toronto | Team |

Arlenys Romero (born 7 February 1984) is a Cuban basketball player for Pinar del Río and the Cuban national team, where she participated at the 2014 FIBA World Championship.

She was a member of the team which competed for Cuba at the 2015 Pan American Games, winning a bronze medal.
