= Jucimara Evangelista Dantas =

Brazilian basketball player (born 1978)

Personal information
- Born: 4 February 1978 (age 47); Ilha Solteira, Brazil

Sport
- Sport: Basketball

Jucimara Evangelista Dantas (born 4 February 1978) is a Brazilian basketball player. She competed in the women's tournament at the 2008 Summer Olympics.
