= Monica Bastiani =

Italian basketball player (born 1964)

Personal information
- Nationality: Italian
- Born: 4 January 1964 (age 61); Brindisi, Italy

Sport
- Sport: Basketball

Monica Bastiani (born 4 January 1964) is an Italian former basketball player. She competed in the women's tournament at the 1992 Summer Olympics.
