= Suchitel Ávila =

Cuban basketball player (born 1982)

Capitalinas
- Position: Forward
- League: LSB

Personal information
- Born: September 1, 1982 (age 44)
- Listed height: 5 ft 11 in (1.80 m)
Medals
Women's basketball
Representing Cuba
Pan American Games
Gold medal – first place	2003 Santo Domingo	Team
Bronze medal – third place	2015 Toronto	Team
Central American and Caribbean Games
Gold medal – first place	2006 Cartagena	Team

Suchitel Ávila Casaña (born 1 September 1982) is a Cuban women's basketball player with Capitalinas. She also competes internationally with Cuba women's national basketball team.

She was a member of the team which competed for Cuba at the 2015 Pan American Games, winning a bronze medal.
