= 2026 FIBA Women's Basketball World Cup squads =

The following is the list of squads for each of the 16 teams competing in the 2026 FIBA Women's Basketball World Cup, held in Germany between 4 and 13 September 2026. Each team selects a squad of 12 players for the tournament.

== Group A ==
=== Germany ===
A 16-player roster was announced on 17 July 2026. A revised 14-player roster was confirmed on 29 August 2026. The final squad was revealed on 2 September 2026.

Germany women's national basketball team roster
Players
Coaches

Pos.	No.	Name	Age – Date of birth	Height	Club	Ctr.
PG	1	Alexis Peterson	31 – 20 June 1995	1.70 m (5 ft 7 in)	Valencia Basket	(Spain)
G	3	Alexandra Wilke	29 – 29 September 1996	1.76 m (5 ft 9 in)	Rutronik Stars Keltern	(Germany)
PF	8	Nyara Sabally	26 – 26 February 2000	1.93 m (6 ft 4 in)	Toronto Tempo	(Canada)
SF	9	Emma Eichmeyer	26 – 25 February 2000	1.83 m (6 ft 0 in)	Saarlouis Royals	(Germany)
SG	13	Leonie Fiebich	26 – 10 January 2000	1.92 m (6 ft 4 in)	New York Liberty	(United States)
C	15	Luisa Geiselsöder	26 – 10 February 2000	1.93 m (6 ft 4 in)	Portland Fire	(United States)
PG	19	Britta Daub	27 – 20 January 1999	1.77 m (5 ft 10 in)	Eisvögel USC Freiburg	(Germany)
PF	20	Frieda Bühner	22 – 28 May 2004	1.87 m (6 ft 2 in)	Portland Fire	(United States)
PF	21	Marie Gülich (C)	32 – 28 May 1994	1.95 m (6 ft 5 in)	Townsville Fire	(Australia)
SF	22	Emily Bessoir	24 – 19 November 2001	1.94 m (6 ft 4 in)	CB Jairis	(Spain)
PG	24	Lina Sontag	22 – 24 November 2003	1.91 m (6 ft 3 in)	AE Sedis Bàsquet	(Spain)
PG	25	Clara Bielefeld	19 – 28 August 2007	1.95 m (6 ft 5 in)	TCU Horned Frogs	(United States)

Head coach

- (Germany) Olaf Lange

Assistant coach(es)

- (France) Julie Barennes
- (Germany) Stefan Möller
- (Germany) Constanze Wegner

Legend

- (C) Team captain
- Club – describes last
  club before the tournament
- Age – describes age
  on 4 September 2026

=== Japan ===
A 14-player roster was announced on 27 July 2026. The final squad was revealed on 20 August 2026.

Japan women's national basketball team roster
Players
Coaches

Pos.	No.	Name	Age – Date of birth	Height	Club	Ctr.
SG	2	Norika Konno	26 – 1 May 2000	1.79 m (5 ft 10 in)	Eneos Sunflowers	(Japan)
PF	3	Stephanie Mawuli	27 – 25 November 1998	1.82 m (6 ft 0 in)	CB Avenida	(Spain)
SF	6	Otoha Goto	19 – 13 February 2007	1.78 m (5 ft 10 in)	Tokyo Healthcare University	(Japan)
C	8	Maki Takada	37 – 23 August 1989	1.85 m (6 ft 1 in)	Denso Iris	(Japan)
C	10	Ramu Tokashiki	35 – 11 June 1991	1.93 m (6 ft 4 in)	Toyota Antelopes	(Japan)
PG	13	Rui Machida	33 – 8 March 1993	1.62 m (5 ft 4 in)	Fujitsu Red Wave	(Japan)
C	14	Azusa Asahina	22 – 20 October 2003	1.85 m (6 ft 1 in)	Toyota Boshoku Sunshine Rabbits	(Japan)
PG	23	Mai Yamamoto	26 – 23 October 1999	1.63 m (5 ft 4 in)	Las Vegas Aces	(United States)
PG	26	Kokoro Tanaka	20 – 10 January 2006	1.73 m (5 ft 8 in)	Eneos Sunflowers	(Japan)
SG	27	Saki Hayashi	31 – 16 March 1995	1.73 m (5 ft 8 in)	Fujitsu Red Wave	(Japan)
PF	52	Yuki Miyazawa (C)	33 – 2 June 1993	1.83 m (6 ft 0 in)	Fujitsu Red Wave	(Japan)
SG	75	Nanako Todo	25 – 29 November 2000	1.75 m (5 ft 9 in)	Toyota Boshoku Sunshine Rabbits	(Japan)

Head coach

- (United States) Corey Gaines

Assistant coach(es)

- (Japan) Tomoki Miyata

Legend

- (C) Team captain
- Club – describes last
  club before the tournament
- Age – describes age
  on 4 September 2026

=== Mali ===
A 23-player roster was announced on 26 July 2026. The final squad was revealed on 2 September 2026.

Mali women's national basketball team roster
Players
Coaches

Pos.	No.	Name	Age – Date of birth	Height	Club	Ctr.
PF	2	Aminata Sangaré	24 – 10 February 2002	1.85 m (6 ft 1 in)	Baloncesto Leganés	(Spain)
PG	4	Fatoumata Sanou	22 – 30 June 2004	1.55 m (5 ft 1 in)	l'ASFAS	(Mali)
G	9	Djénéba Sangaré	26 – 7 October 1999	1.78 m (5 ft 10 in)	Garonne Avenir Basket du Marmandais	(France)
PF	10	Maimouna Haidara	22 – 2 June 2004	1.87 m (6 ft 2 in)	CB Cidade de Lugo	(Spain)
PF	12	Alima Dembélé	26 – 20 January 2000	1.86 m (6 ft 1 in)	Azulmarino Palma	(Spain)
C	13	Mama Cissé	22 – 3 September 2004	1.83 m (6 ft 0 in)	Canet en Roussillon Basket Club	(France)
C	15	Naîgnouma Coulibaly	37 – 31 May 1989	1.91 m (6 ft 3 in)	AS Police	(Mali)
F	22	Kamita Dabou	21 – 9 November 2004	1.79 m (5 ft 10 in)	ASA Sceaux	(France)
PF	23	Sika Koné	24 – 13 July 2002	1.90 m (6 ft 3 in)	Atlanta Dream	(United States)
G	50	Djeneba N'Diaye (C)	29 – 8 July 1997	1.65 m (5 ft 5 in)	CB Islas Canarias	(Spain)
G	52	Rokia Doumbia	27 – 5 May 1999	1.75 m (5 ft 9 in)	Oakland Swish	(United States)
C	77	Diana Balayera	30 – 28 January 1996	1.91 m (6 ft 3 in)	DVTK Huntherm	(Hungary)

Head coach

- (Mali) Oumarou Sidiya

Assistant coach(es)

- (Mali) Diana Gandega
- (Mali) Kaba Kante

Legend

- (C) Team captain
- Club – describes last
  club before the tournament
- Age – describes age
  on 4 September 2026

=== Spain ===
A 21-player roster was announced on 24 July 2026. The final squad was revealed on 31 August 2026.

Spain women's national basketball team roster
Players
Coaches

Pos.	No.	Name	Age – Date of birth	Height	Club	Ctr.
G	2	Elena Buenavida	22 – 8 March 2004	1.75 m (5 ft 9 in)	Valencia Basket	(Spain)
PG	4	Mariona Ortiz	34 – 28 February 1992	1.82 m (6 ft 0 in)	Basket Zaragoza	(Spain)
PG	5	Maite Cazorla	29 – 18 June 1997	1.78 m (5 ft 10 in)	USK Praha	(Czech Republic)
SF	7	Alba Torrens (C)	37 – 30 August 1989	1.92 m (6 ft 4 in)	AzulMarino Palma	(Spain)
SF	9	Helena Pueyo	25 – 13 February 2001	1.82 m (6 ft 0 in)	Valencia Basket	(Spain)
SF	10	María Conde	29 – 14 January 1997	1.87 m (6 ft 2 in)	Toronto Tempo	(Canada)
C	11	Awa Fam	20 – 17 June 2006	1.95 m (6 ft 5 in)	Seattle Storm	(United States)
PF	14	Raquel Carrera	24 – 31 October 2001	1.90 m (6 ft 3 in)	New York Liberty	(United States)
C	17	Megan DiLeo	29 – 13 December 1996	1.94 m (6 ft 4 in)	Portland Fire	(United States)
G	18	Alicia Flórez	22 – 19 April 2004	1.75 m (5 ft 9 in)	Valencia Basket	(Spain)
C	20	Paula Ginzo	28 – 16 February 1998	1.90 m (6 ft 3 in)	Žabiny Brno	(Czech Republic)
PG	44	Iyana Martín	20 – 18 January 2006	1.75 m (5 ft 9 in)	Spar Girona	(Spain)

Head coach

- (Spain) Miguel Méndez

Assistant coach(es)

- (Spain) Cristina Cantero
- (Spain) Raquel Romo

Legend

- (C) Team captain
- Club – describes last
  club before the tournament
- Age – describes age
  on 4 September 2026

== Group B ==
=== France ===
A 32-player roster was announced on 7 July 2026. The final squad was revealed on 29 August 2026.

France women's national basketball roster
Players
Coaches

Pos.	No.	Name	Age – Date of birth	Height	Club	Ctr.
PG	0	Carla Leite	22 – 16 April 2004	1.75 m (5 ft 9 in)	Portland Fire	(United States)
SF	11	Valériane Ayayi	32 – 29 April 1994	1.84 m (6 ft 0 in)	Phoenix Mercury	(United States)
F	13	Janelle Salaün	24 – 5 September 2001	1.88 m (6 ft 2 in)	Golden State Valkyries	(United States)
C	14	Dominique Malonga	20 – 16 November 2005	1.97 m (6 ft 6 in)	Seattle Storm	(United States)
F	15	Gabby Williams (C)	29 – 9 September 1996	1.80 m (5 ft 11 in)	Golden State Valkyries	(United States)
C	22	Marième Badiane	31 – 24 November 1994	1.90 m (6 ft 3 in)	Beşiktaş	(Turkey)
SG	23	Marine Johannès	31 – 21 January 1995	1.78 m (5 ft 10 in)	New York Liberty	(United States)
SG	28	Mamignan Touré	31 – 19 December 1994	1.83 m (6 ft 0 in)	BA Sparta Praha	(Czech Republic)
C	31	Aminata Gueye	24 – 10 July 2002	1.90 m (6 ft 3 in)	BA Sparta Praha	(Czech Republic)
PG	47	Romane Bernies	33 – 27 June 1993	1.70 m (5 ft 7 in)	BLMA	(France)
G	71	Leïla Lacan	22 – 2 June 2004	1.82 m (6 ft 0 in)	Connecticut Sun	(United States)
G	98	Pauline Astier	24 – 15 February 2002	1.79 m (5 ft 10 in)	New York Liberty	(United States)

Head coach

- (France) Jean-Aimé Toupane

Assistant coach(es)

- (France) David Gautier
- (France) Grégory Halin
- (France) Christophe Léonard

Legend

- (C) Team captain
- Club – describes last
  club before the tournament
- Age – describes age
  on 4 September 2026

=== Hungary ===
A 25-player roster was announced on 10 June 2026. It was reduced to 14 players on 10 July 2026. The final squad was revealed on 31 August 2026.

Hungary women's national basketball team roster
Players
Coaches

Pos.	No.	Name	Age – Date of birth	Height	Club	Ctr.
C	2	Virág Kiss (C)	28 – 12 April 1998	1.94 m (6 ft 4 in)	Valencia Basket	(Spain)
PG	7	Veronika Kányási	27 – 27 May 1999	1.78 m (5 ft 10 in)	DVTK	(Hungary)
PG	8	Eszter Rátkai	19 – 14 December 2006	1.78 m (5 ft 10 in)	KSC Szekszárd	(Hungary)
G	9	Ágnes Studer	27 – 10 September 1998	1.68 m (5 ft 6 in)	PEAC-Pécs	(Hungary)
PG	10	Nina Aho	29 – 24 June 1997	1.75 m (5 ft 9 in)	DVTK	(Hungary)
C	11	Kinga Josepovits	18 – 2 January 2008	1.96 m (6 ft 5 in)	PEAC-Pécs	(Hungary)
SF	13	Ágnes Török	28 – 23 January 1998	1.83 m (6 ft 0 in)	PEAC-Pécs	(Hungary)
PF	14	Dorka Juhász	26 – 18 December 1999	1.95 m (6 ft 5 in)	Minnesota Lynx	(United States)
SG	21	Réka Lelik	27 – 14 April 1999	1.79 m (5 ft 10 in)	Emlak Konut SK	(Turkey)
PG	22	Yvonne Turner	38 – 13 October 1987	1.78 m (5 ft 10 in)	Polonia Warsaw	(Poland)
G	33	Panka Dúl	25 – 23 October 2000	1.78 m (5 ft 10 in)	ETO Basket	(Hungary)
C	55	Judit Barnai	32 – 17 January 1994	1.88 m (6 ft 2 in)	Ceglédi EKK	(Hungary)

Head coach

- (Hungary) Péter Völgyi

Assistant coach(es)

- (Romania) Marta Abraham
- (Hungary) Kornel Varadi

Legend

- (C) Team captain
- Club – describes last
  club before the tournament
- Age – describes age
  on 4 September 2026

=== Nigeria ===
A 21-player roster was announced on 16 April 2026. The final squad was revealed on 3 September 2026.

Nigeria women's national basketball team – 2026 FIBA World Cup roster
Players
Coaches

Pos.	No.	Name	Age – Date of birth	Height	Club	Ctr.
F	0	Amy Okonkwo (C)	30 – 26 August 1996	1.88 m (6 ft 2 in)	Portland Fire	(United States)
SG	1	Grace Efosa-Aguebor	24 – 27 May 2002	1.77 m (5 ft 10 in)	Saint-Amand Hainaut	(France)
C	3	Pallas Kunaiyi-Akpannah	29 – 12 July 1997	1.88 m (6 ft 2 in)	Emlak Konut SK	(Turkey)
G	4	Elizabeth Balogun	25 – 9 September 2000	1.85 m (6 ft 1 in)	Valencia Basket	(Spain)
F	5	Jordan Obi	23 – 18 September 2002	1.85 m (6 ft 1 in)	Kirklareli Basketbol SK	(Turkey)
PG	10	Promise Amukamara	33 – 22 June 1993	1.75 m (5 ft 9 in)	REG BBC	(Rwanda)
PF	15	Maryam Dauda	23 – 20 September 2002	1.93 m (6 ft 4 in)	Morlaix Saint Martin	(France)
F	20	Murjanatu Musa	26 – 5 May 2000	1.87 m (6 ft 2 in)	Basket Landes	(France)
PG	23	Ezinne Kalu	34 – 26 June 1992	1.73 m (5 ft 8 in)	Beijing Great Wall	(China)
C	25	Victoria Macaulay	36 – 7 August 1990	1.93 m (6 ft 4 in)	Athinaikos Qualco	(Greece)
C	32	Rita Igbokwe	25 – 28 January 2001	1.93 m (6 ft 4 in)	Baloncesto Leganés	(Spain)
F	33	Nicole Enabosi	29 – 26 March 1997	1.83 m (6 ft 0 in)	DVTK Huntherm	(Hungary)

Head coach

- (Nigeria) Rena Wakama

Assistant coach(es)

- (France) Wani Muganguzi

Legend

- (C) Team captain
- Club – describes last
  club before the tournament
- Age – describes age
  on 4 September 2026

=== South Korea ===
A 13-player roster was announced on 26 May 2026. The final squad was revealed on 25 August 2026.

South Korea women's national basketball team roster
Players
Coaches

Pos.	No.	Name	Age – Date of birth	Height	Club	Ctr.
F	1	Park Ji-hyun	26 – 7 April 2000	1.85 m (6 ft 1 in)	Los Angeles Sparks	(United States)
G	2	Heo Ye-eun	25 – 24 July 2001	1.67 m (5 ft 6 in)	Cheongju KB Stars	(South Korea)
F	3	Kang Lee-seul (C)	32 – 5 April 1994	1.80 m (5 ft 11 in)	Asan Woori Bank Woori Won	(South Korea)
PG	5	An He-ji	29 – 12 February 1997	1.64 m (5 ft 5 in)	Busan BNK Sum	(South Korea)
PF	6	Choi I-saem	32 – 17 August 1994	1.83 m (6 ft 0 in)	Busan BNK Sum	(South Korea)
F	8	Jeong Hyun	20 – 13 August 2006	1.80 m (5 ft 11 in)	Bucheon Hana Bank	(South Korea)
G	9	Lee So-hee	26 – 7 August 2000	1.71 m (5 ft 7 in)	Busan BNK Sum	(South Korea)
F	10	Kang Yoo-lim	29 – 23 March 1997	1.75 m (5 ft 9 in)	Samsung Life Blueminx	(South Korea)
G	11	Park So-hee	23 – 15 May 2003	1.78 m (5 ft 10 in)	Bucheon Hana Bank	(South Korea)
F	12	Lee Hae-ran	23 – 29 May 2003	1.82 m (6 ft 0 in)	Samsung Life Blueminx	(South Korea)
PF	39	Hong Yu-sun	21 – 23 February 2005	1.79 m (5 ft 10 in)	Incheon Shinhan	(South Korea)
C	77	Jin An	30 – 23 March 1996	1.82 m (6 ft 0 in)	Bucheon Hana Bank	(South Korea)

Head coach

- (South Korea) Park Soo-ho

Assistant coach(es)

- (South Korea) Yang Ji-hee

Legend

- (C) Team captain
- Club – describes last
  club before the tournament
- Age – describes age
  on 4 September 2026

== Group C ==
=== Australia ===
The roster was announced on 26 July 2026. The final squad was confirmed on 27 August 2026, after an injury withdrawal from Sami Whitcomb.

Australia women's national basketball team roster
Players
Coaches

Pos.	No.	Name	Age – Date of birth	Height	Club	Ctr.
SG	1	Miela Sowah	26 – 4 June 2000	1.75 m (5 ft 9 in)	Golden State Valkyries	(United States)
G	2	Jade Melbourne	24 – 18 August 2002	1.78 m (5 ft 10 in)	Seattle Storm	(United States)
SG	4	Alex Wilson	32 – 21 March 1994	1.83 m (6 ft 0 in)	Sydney Flames	(Australia)
SF	6	Stephanie Talbot	32 – 15 June 1994	1.88 m (6 ft 2 in)	Las Vegas Aces	(United States)
F	11	Alanna Smith	29 – 10 September 1996	1.93 m (6 ft 4 in)	Dallas Wings	(United States)
PG	12	Stephanie Reid	30 – 22 July 1996	1.68 m (5 ft 6 in)	Tasmania Jewels	(Australia)
PF	13	Ezi Magbegor (C)	27 – 13 August 1999	1.93 m (6 ft 4 in)	Seattle Storm	(United States)
G	20	Isobel Borlase	21 – 12 September 2004	1.80 m (5 ft 11 in)	Atlanta Dream	(United States)
C	22	Zitina Aokuso	27 – 23 November 1998	1.93 m (6 ft 4 in)	Adelaide Lightning	(Australia)
F	23	Alex Fowler	25 – 21 July 2001	1.83 m (6 ft 0 in)	Townsville Fire	(Australia)
F	34	Isabelle Bourne	25 – 21 November 2000	1.88 m (6 ft 2 in)	Sydney Flames	(Australia)
PF	55	Chloe Bibby	28 – 15 June 1998	1.88 m (6 ft 2 in)	Minnesota Lynx	(United States)

Head coach

- (Australia) Sandy Brondello

Assistant coach(es)

- (Australia) Renae Garlepp
- (Australia) Paul Goriss
- (New Zealand) Kennedy Kereama

Legend

- (C) Team captain
- Club – describes last
  club before the tournament
- Age – describes age
  on 4 September 2026

=== Belgium ===
A 19-player roster was announced on 30 July 2026. The final squad was revealed on 25 August 2026.

Belgium women's national basketball team roster
Players
Coaches

Pos.	No.	Name	Age – Date of birth	Height	Club	Ctr.
PG	4	Elise Ramette	27 – 3 November 1998	1.71 m (5 ft 7 in)	ŽKK Budućnost Podgorica	(Montenegro)
PF	5	Nastja Claessens	21 – 2 December 2004	1.86 m (6 ft 1 in)	Kansas State Wildcats	(United States)
SF	6	Antonia Delaere	32 – 1 August 1994	1.82 m (6 ft 0 in)	Minnesota Lynx	(United States)
PF	11	Emma Meesseman (C)	33 – 13 May 1993	1.93 m (6 ft 4 in)	Fenerbahçe	(Turkey)
C	13	Kyara Linskens	29 – 13 November 1996	1.93 m (6 ft 4 in)	Phoenix Mercury	(United States)
SF	22	Bethy Mununga	29 – 22 July 1997	1.83 m (6 ft 0 in)	ASVEL Basket	(France)
C	25	Becky Massey	26 – 21 March 2000	1.86 m (6 ft 1 in)	Basket Landes	(France)
SF	31	Maxuella Lisowa-Mbaka	25 – 14 May 2001	1.78 m (5 ft 10 in)	CS Rapid București	(Romania)
C	34	Billie Massey	26 – 21 March 2000	1.86 m (6 ft 1 in)	CB Jairis	(Spain)
G	35	Julie Vanloo	33 – 10 February 1993	1.73 m (5 ft 8 in)	Athinaikos	(Greece)
PG	55	Julie Allemand	30 – 7 July 1996	1.74 m (5 ft 9 in)	Toronto Tempo	(Canada)
G	71	Alicia Courthiau	20 – 6 December 2005	1.78 m (5 ft 10 in)	Wisconsin Badgers	(United States)

Head coach

- (United States) Mike Thibault

Assistant coach(es)

- (Belgium) Pascal Angillis
- (France) Frederic Dusart

Legend

- (C) Team captain
- Club – describes last
  club before the tournament
- Age – describes age
  on 4 September 2026

=== Puerto Rico ===
A 14-player roster was announced on 17 August 2026. The final squad was revealed on 30 August 2026.

Puerto Rico women's national basketball team roster
Players
Coaches

Pos.	No.	Name	Age – Date of birth	Height	Club	Ctr.
F	1	Tayra Meléndez	32 – 29 October 1993	1.80 m (5 ft 11 in)	Gigantes de Carolina	(Puerto Rico)
SG	2	Brianna Jones	29 – 9 February 1997	1.85 m (6 ft 1 in)	Cangrejeras de Santurce	(Puerto Rico)
PG	3	Nina De León	23 – 26 January 2003	1.68 m (5 ft 6 in)	Pollitas de Isabela	(Puerto Rico)
PG	5	Pamela Rosado (C)	40 – 30 April 1986	1.65 m (5 ft 5 in)	Atenienses de Manatí	(Puerto Rico)
G	6	Zaida González	23 – 17 January 2003	1.75 m (5 ft 9 in)	Cariduras de Fajardo	(Puerto Rico)
C	11	Sofía Roma	29 – 21 November 1996	1.88 m (6 ft 2 in)	Ganaderas de Hatillo	(Puerto Rico)
G	22	Arella Guirantes	28 – 15 October 1997	1.80 m (5 ft 11 in)	Elitzur Ramla	(Israel)
PG	23	Trinity San Antonio	22 – 28 October 2003	1.74 m (5 ft 9 in)	Basket Landes	(France)
F	25	Denise Solís	24 – 6 October 2001	1.88 m (6 ft 2 in)	Criollas de Caguas	(Puerto Rico)
C	33	India Pagán	27 – 7 January 1999	1.87 m (6 ft 2 in)	Atenienses de Manati	(Puerto Rico)
C	34	Imani McGee-Stafford	31 – 11 October 1994	2.00 m (6 ft 7 in)	Monarcas de Juana Díaz	(Puerto Rico)
G	55	Jacqueline Benítez	29 – 6 June 1997	1.78 m (5 ft 10 in)	Criollas de Caguas	(Puerto Rico)

Head coach

- (Puerto Rico) Jerry Batista

Assistant coach(es)

- (Puerto Rico) Carla Cortijo
- (Puerto Rico) Jorge Otero

Legend

- (C) Team captain
- Club – describes last
  club before the tournament
- Age – describes age
  on 4 September 2026

=== Turkey ===
A 20-player roster was announced on 22 July 2026. The final squad was revealed on 2 September 2026.

Turkey women's national basketball team roster
Players
Coaches

Pos.	No.	Name	Age – Date of birth	Height	Club	Ctr.
PF	1	Elif İstanbulluoğlu	21 – 4 April 2005	1.90 m (6 ft 3 in)	Louisville Cardinals	(United States)
SG	2	Sevgi Uzun	28 – 25 November 1997	1.78 m (5 ft 10 in)	Galatasaray	(Turkey)
PG	4	Olcay Çakır (C)	33 – 13 July 1993	1.82 m (6 ft 0 in)	Fenerbahçe	(Turkey)
SG	6	Gökşen Fitik	25 – 11 August 2001	1.75 m (5 ft 9 in)	Galatasaray	(Turkey)
SG	8	Ayşe Cora	33 – 3 March 1993	1.78 m (5 ft 10 in)	Galatasaray	(Turkey)
PF	11	Elif Bayram	24 – 18 September 2001	1.85 m (6 ft 1 in)	Galatasaray	(Turkey)
PF	15	Tilbe Şenyürek	31 – 26 April 1995	1.92 m (6 ft 4 in)	Spar Girona	(Spain)
PG	17	Derin Erdoğan	24 – 28 June 2002	1.74 m (5 ft 9 in)	Galatasaray	(Turkey)
SF	20	Sinem Ataş	31 – 1 January 1995	1.85 m (6 ft 1 in)	ÇBK Mersin	(Turkey)
PF	22	Kennedy Burke	29 – 14 February 1997	1.85 m (6 ft 1 in)	Connecticut Sun	(United States)
SF	30	Melek Uzunoğlu	24 – 26 March 2002	1.88 m (6 ft 2 in)	Emlak Konut	(Turkey)
C	33	Esra Ural	35 – 18 August 1991	1.98 m (6 ft 6 in)	ÇBK Mersin	(Turkey)

Head coach

- (Italy) Andrea Mazzon

Assistant coach(es)

- (Turkey) Murat Alkaş
- (Turkey) Fatih Gezer
- (Turkey) Burak Kaya

Legend

- (C) Team captain
- Club – describes last
  club before the tournament
- Age – describes age
  on 4 September 2026

== Group D ==
=== China ===
A 19-player roster was announced on 14 April 2026. The final squad was revealed on 2 September 2026.

China women's national basketball team roster
Players
Coaches

Pos.	No.	Name	Age – Date of birth	Height	Club	Ctr.
G	1	Zhang Manman	29 – 8 January 1997	1.70 m (5 ft 7 in)	Jiangsu Phoenix	(China)
G	4	Li Yuan	26 – 29 May 2000	1.70 m (5 ft 7 in)	Inner Mongolia Nongxin	(China)
G	5	Wang Siyu	30 – 16 October 1995	1.80 m (5 ft 11 in)	Sichuan Yuanda Meile	(China)
G	6	Yang Shuyu	24 – 6 March 2002	1.83 m (6 ft 0 in)	Melbourne Tigers	(Australia)
PF	9	Tang Ziting	26 – 14 June 2000	1.90 m (6 ft 3 in)	Sichuan Yuanda Meile	(China)
F	11	Luo Xinyu	24 – 22 November 2001	1.88 m (6 ft 2 in)	Jiangsu Phoenix	(China)
SG	12	Chen Yujie (C)	26 – 23 June 2000	1.78 m (5 ft 10 in)	Sichuan Yuanda Meile	(China)
C	15	Han Xu	26 – 31 October 1999	2.05 m (6 ft 9 in)	New York Liberty	(United States)
C	18	Chen Mingling	26 – 25 July 2000	1.92 m (6 ft 4 in)	Guangdong Vermilion Birds	(China)
C	19	Zhang Ziyu	19 – 2 May 2007	2.23 m (7 ft 4 in)	Shandong Six Stars	(China)
SG	20	Sun Yu	22 – 11 February 2004	1.83 m (6 ft 0 in)	Jiangsu Phoenix	(China)
F	31	Jia Saiqi	27 – 30 December 1998	1.85 m (6 ft 1 in)	Sichuan Yuanda Meile	(China)

Head coach

- (China) Gong Luming

Assistant coach(es)

- (France) Pierre Vincent
- (China) Wang Ling
- (China) Thang Yong

Legend

- (C) Team captain
- Club – describes last
  club before the tournament
- Age – describes age
  on 4 September 2026

=== Czechia ===
A 21-player roster was announced on 15 May 2026. The final squad was revealed on 29 August 2026.

Czechia women's national basketball roster
Players
Coaches

Pos.	No.	Name	Age – Date of birth	Height	Club	Ctr.
PG	1	Kateřina Zeithammerová	24 – 17 April 2002	1.62 m (5 ft 4 in)	Žabiny Brno	(Czech Republic)
SF	2	Julie Pospíšilová	27 – 20 June 1999	1.83 m (6 ft 0 in)	Flammes Carolo Basket	(France)
C	3	Alena Hanušová	35 – 29 May 1991	1.90 m (6 ft 3 in)	DSK Brandýs	(Czech Republic)
SG	4	Gabriela Andělová	30 – 21 March 1996	1.73 m (5 ft 8 in)	USK Praha	(Czech Republic)
PF	5	Natálie Stoupalová (C)	28 – 13 July 1998	1.88 m (6 ft 2 in)	Žabiny Brno	(Czech Republic)
PG	7	Petra Malíková	23 – 9 September 2002	1.78 m (5 ft 10 in)	USK Praha	(Czech Republic)
SF	8	Veronika Voráčková	27 – 21 March 1999	1.87 m (6 ft 2 in)	Basket Zaragoza	(Spain)
PG	10	Eliška Joklová	24 – 1 October 2001	1.82 m (6 ft 0 in)	Minnesota Lynx	(United States)
PG	12	Monika Fučíková	24 – 23 March 2002	1.80 m (5 ft 11 in)	Žabiny Brno	(Czech Republic)
SG	13	Petra Holešínská	29 – 12 March 1997	1.78 m (5 ft 10 in)	Botaş SK	(Turkey)
C	16	Kateřina Kalná	19 – 21 March 2007	1.90 m (6 ft 3 in)	USK Praha	(Czech Republic)
F	20	Natálie Koucká	23 – 7 August 2003	1.93 m (6 ft 4 in)	USK Praha	(Czech Republic)

Head coach

- (Czech Republic) Romana Ptáčková

Assistant coach(es)

- (Czech Republic) Petr Treml

Legend

- (C) Team captain
- Club – describes last
  club before the tournament
- Age – describes age
  on 4 September 2026

=== Italy ===
An 18-player roster was announced on 28 July 2026. The final squad was announced on 31 August 2026.

Italy women's national basketball team roster
Players
Coaches

Pos.	No.	Name	Age – Date of birth	Height	Club	Ctr.
PF	0	Jasmine Keys	28 – 8 October 1997	1.90 m (6 ft 3 in)	PF Schio	(Italy)
PG	5	Matilde Villa	21 – 9 December 2004	1.72 m (5 ft 8 in)	Reyer Venezia	(Italy)
G	6	Francesca Pasa	26 – 22 May 2000	1.75 m (5 ft 9 in)	Reyer Venezia	(Italy)
SG	8	Costanza Verona	27 – 6 August 1999	1.70 m (5 ft 7 in)	PF Schio	(Italy)
SF	9	Cecilia Zandalasini	30 – 16 March 1996	1.86 m (6 ft 1 in)	Golden State Valkyries	(United States)
SF	11	Francesca Pan	29 – 27 May 1997	1.83 m (6 ft 0 in)	Reyer Venezia	(Italy)
C	13	Lorela Cubaj	27 – 8 January 1999	1.92 m (6 ft 4 in)	Reyer Venezia	(Italy)
PF	14	Sara Madera	26 – 28 June 2000	1.87 m (6 ft 2 in)	Magnolia Basket Campobasso	(Italy)
PG	18	Mariella Santucci	29 – 18 June 1997	1.70 m (5 ft 7 in)	Reyer Venezia	(Italy)
SG	19	Martina Fassina	27 – 7 April 1999	1.83 m (6 ft 0 in)	CB Avenida	(Spain)
C	22	Olbis Andrè (C)	27 – 25 December 1998	1.92 m (6 ft 4 in)	PF Schio	(Italy)
PG	55	Vittoria Blasigh	22 – 7 April 2004	1.75 m (5 ft 9 in)	UCF Knights	(United States)

Head coach

- (Italy) Andrea Capobianco

Assistant coach(es)

- (Italy) Vincenzo Di Meglio
- (Italy) Angela Gianolla

Legend

- (C) Team captain
- Club – describes last
  club before the tournament
- Age – describes age
  on 4 September 2026

=== United States ===
The roster was announced on 6 August 2026. On 31 August 2026, A'ja Wilson and Kelsey Plum withdrew from the team due to health reasons and were replaced by Sonia Citron and Kiki Iriafen.

United States women's national basketball team roster
Players
Coaches

Pos.	No.	Name	Age – Date of birth	Height	Club	Ctr.
G	4	Paige Bueckers	24 – 20 October 2001	1.83 m (6 ft 0 in)	Dallas Wings	(United States)
G	5	Sonia Citron	22 – 22 October 2003	1.85 m (6 ft 1 in)	Washington Mystics	(United States)
G	6	Rhyne Howard	26 – 29 April 2000	1.88 m (6 ft 2 in)	Atlanta Dream	(United States)
G	7	Kahleah Copper	32 – 28 August 1994	1.85 m (6 ft 1 in)	Phoenix Mercury	(United States)
G	8	Chelsea Gray	33 – 8 October 1992	1.80 m (5 ft 11 in)	Las Vegas Aces	(United States)
F	9	Kiki Iriafen	23 – 26 August 2003	1.91 m (6 ft 3 in)	Washington Mystics	(United States)
PF	10	Breanna Stewart (C)	32 – 27 August 1994	1.91 m (6 ft 3 in)	New York Liberty	(United States)
SF	11	Napheesa Collier	29 – 23 September 1996	1.86 m (6 ft 1 in)	Minnesota Lynx	(United States)
G	12	Caitlin Clark	24 – 22 January 2002	1.83 m (6 ft 0 in)	Indiana Fever	(United States)
G	13	Jackie Young	28 – 16 September 1997	1.83 m (6 ft 0 in)	Las Vegas Aces	(United States)
F	14	Aliyah Boston	24 – 11 December 2001	1.93 m (6 ft 4 in)	Indiana Fever	(United States)
F	15	Angel Reese	24 – 6 May 2002	1.90 m (6 ft 3 in)	Atlanta Dream	(United States)

Head coach

- (United States) Kara Lawson

Assistant coach(es)

- (United States) Jose Fernandez
- (United States) Natalie Nakase
- (United States) Nate Tibbetts
- (United States) Stephanie White

Legend

- (C) Team captain
- Club – describes last
  club before the tournament
- Age – describes age
  on 4 September 2026
