= Mara Fullin =

Italian basketball player

Personal information
- Born: 13 January 1965 (age 61) Venice
- Listed height: 182 cm (6 ft 0 in)
- Listed weight: 72 kg (159 lb)

Career information
- Playing career: 1980–1998

Career history
- 1980–1988: Vicenza
- 1990–1998: Pool Comense

Career highlights
- Italian Basketball Hall of Fame (2014)

Mara Fullin (born 13 January 1965 in Venice) is a former Italian women's professional basketball player. She was inducted into the Italian Basketball Hall of Fame, in 2014.

== Club career ==
Fullin played throughout her career for AS Vicenza and Pool Comense, winning seven EuroLeague Women titles. She retired in 1998.

== Italian national team ==
Fullin was a member of the senior Italian women's national team for thirteen years, taking part in the 1992 Summer Olympics, and the 1996 Summer Olympics. She also played at the 1990 FIBA World Championship for Women, and at five EuroBasket Women tournaments.
