= Yuliseny Soria =

Cuban basketball player

Yuliseny Soria Baró (born 8 August 1979 in Havana) is a Cuban former basketball player who competed in the 2000 Summer Olympics.
