= Ana Hernández =

Cuban basketball player

Medal record

Women's Basketball

Representing Cuba

FIBA World Championship
Bronze medal – third place	1990 Malaysia	Team competition

Ana Gloria Hernández Álvarez (born November 10, 1962) is a retired female basketball player from Cuba. She competed for her native country at the 1992 Summer Olympics, finishing in fourth place with the Women's National Team.
