= Cariola Hechavarría =

Cuban basketball player

Cariola Hechavarría (born 7 May 1976) is a former Cuban basketball player who competed in the 1996 Summer Olympics and in the 2000 Summer Olympics.
