= Eva Antalecová =

Slovak basketball player (born 1966)

Personal information
- Nationality: Slovak
- Born: 18 January 1966 (age 59); Prešov, Czechoslovakia

Sport
- Sport: Basketball

Eva Antalecová (born 18 January 1966) is a Slovak basketball player. She competed in the women's tournament at the 1992 Summer Olympics.
