= Joycenara Batista =

Brazilian basketball player (born 1967)

Personal information
- Born: 25 June 1967 (age 59) Curitiba, Brazil

Sport
- Sport: Basketball

Joycenara Batista (born 25 June 1967) is a Brazilian basketball player. She competed in the women's tournament at the 1992 Summer Olympics.
