= Vivian Cristina Lopes =

Brazilian basketball player (born 1976)

Vivian Cristina Lopes (born 7 January 1976) is a Brazilian former basketball player who competed in the 2004 Summer Olympics.
