= Zhan Shuping =

Chinese basketball player

Olympic medal record

Women's basketball

Representing China
Silver medal – second place	1992 Barcelona	Team competition

Zhan Shuping (Chinese: 展淑萍, born 24 April 1964) is a Chinese former basketball player who competed in the 1992 Summer Olympics.
