= Francesca Rossi (basketball) =

Italian basketball player (born 1968)

Personal information
- Nationality: Italian
- Born: 2 June 1968 (age 56); Forlì, Italy

Sport
- Sport: Basketball

Francesca Rossi (born 2 June 1968) is an Italian former basketball player. She competed in the women's tournament at the 1992 Summer Olympics.
