= Grisel Herrera =

Cuban basketball player

Grisel Herrera (born 5 June 1971) is a Cuban former basketball player who competed in the 1992 Summer Olympics, in the 1996 Summer Olympics, and in the 2000 Summer Olympics.
