= Martina Liptáková =

Czech basketball player (born 1965)

Personal information
- Nationality: Czech
- Born: 27 September 1965 (age 59); Slaný, Czechoslovakia

Sport
- Sport: Basketball

Martina Liptáková (born 27 September 1965) is a Czech basketball player. She competed in the women's tournament at the 1992 Summer Olympics.
