= Liset Castillo =

Cuban basketball player (born 1973)

Personal information
- Born: January 21, 1973 (age 53)
Medal record
Women's basketball
Representing Cuba
FIBA World Championship
Bronze medal – third place	1990 Malaysia	Team
Pan American Games
Gold medal – first place	2003 Santo Domingo	Team

Liset Castillo Iglesias (born January 21, 1973, in Pinar del Río) is a retired female basketball player from Cuba. She twice competed for her native country at the Summer Olympics, finishing in fourth (1992) and in ninth place (2000) with the Women's National Team.
