= Stefania Stanzani =

Italian basketball player (born 1968)

Personal information
- Nationality: Italian
- Born: 24 March 1968 (age 58) Rome, Italy

Sport
- Sport: Basketball

Stefania Stanzani (born 24 March 1968) is an Italian basketball player. She competed in the women's tournament at the 1992 Summer Olympics.
