= Silvia Todeschini =

Italian basketball player (born 1967)

Personal information
- Born: December 2, 1967 (age 58) Milan, Italy
- Listed height: 1.72 m (5 ft 8 in)

Career information
- Playing career: 19??–2011
- Position: Point guard

Career history
- 1990–1996: ASDG Comense 1872
- 2010–2011: Lussana Bergamo

Silvia Todeschini (born December 2, 1967) is a former Italian female basketball player.
