= Yamilé Martínez =

Cuban basketball player

Personal information
- Born: November 11, 1970 (age 55)
Medal record
Women's basketball
Representing Cuba
Pan American Games
| Gold medal – first place | 2003 Santo Domingo | Team |
| Bronze medal – third place | 2007 Rio de Janeiro | Team |

Yamilé Martínez Calderón (born November 11, 1970, in Cueto, Holguín) is a women's basketball player from Cuba. Playing as a center she won the gold medal with the Cuba women's national basketball team at the 2003 Pan American Games in Santo Domingo, Dominican Republic.

Martínez also competed for her native country at three consecutive Summer Olympics, starting in 1992 (Barcelona, Spain), finishing in fourth, sixth and ninth place in the final rankings. Her first name is sometimes also spelled as Yamilet.
