= Yelena Khudashova =

Russian basketball player

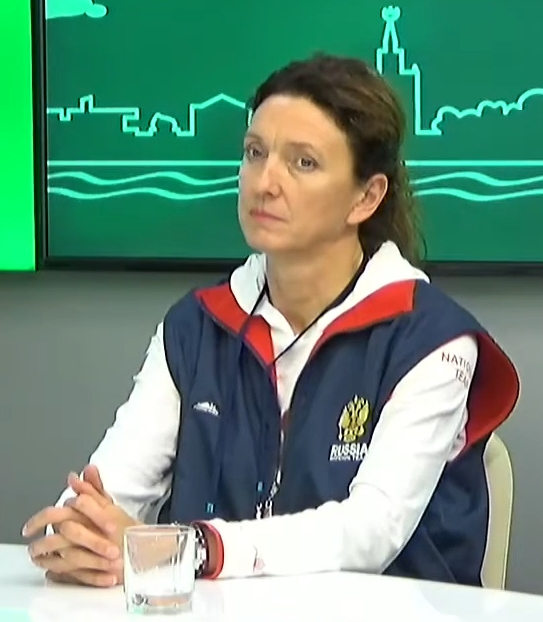

Medal record

Women's basketball

Olympic Games

Representing the Soviet Union
Bronze medal – third place	1988 Seoul	Team competition

Representing the Unified Team
Gold medal – first place	1992 Barcelona	Team competition

Yelena Anatolyevna Khudashova (Russian: Елена Анатольевна Худашова, born 10 July 1965 in Khabarovsk) is a 6'5" tall Russian former basketball player who competed in the 1988 Summer Olympics, in the 1992 Summer Olympics, and in the 2000 Summer Olympics.
