= Biosotis Lagnó =

Cuban basketball player

Biosotis Lagnó (born 16 November 1969) is a Cuban former basketball player who competed in the 1992 Summer Olympics and in the 1996 Summer Olympics. She was born in Havana.
