= Anna Kotočová =

Slovak basketball player (born 1968)

Anna Kotočová (née Janoštinová; born 6 April 1968, in Trstená) is a Slovak former basketball player who competed for Czechoslovakia in the 1988 Summer Olympics, and 1992 Summer Olympics, and for Slovakia, in the 2000 Summer Olympics. She was inducted into the French Basketball Hall of Fame in 2021.
