= Olga Vigil =

Cuban basketball player

Medal record

Women's basketball

Representing Cuba

FIBA World Championship
Bronze medal – third place	1990 Malaysia	Team competition

Olga Lidia Vigil Gómez (born August 26, 1970 in Havana) is a retired female basketball player from Cuba. She twice competed for her native country at the Summer Olympics, finishing in fourth (1992) and in sixth place (1996) with the Women's National Team.
