= Elena Tornikidou =

Uzbekistani-Russian basketball player (born 1965)

Olympic medal record

Women's basketball

Representing the Unified Team
Gold medal – first place	1992 Barcelona	Team competition

Elena Tornikidou (born 27 May 1965) is an Uzbekistani-Russian former basketball player who competed in the 1992 Summer Olympics. She played for the Detroit Shock of the Women's National Basketball Association (WNBA) from 1999 to 2001.
