= Anna Costalunga =

Italian basketball player (born 1970)

Personal information
- Nationality: Italian
- Born: 24 January 1970 (age 55); Schio, Italy

Sport
- Sport: Basketball

Anna Costalunga (born 24 January 1970) is an Italian former basketball player. She competed in the women's tournament at the 1992 Summer Olympics.
