= Andrea Borrell =

Cuban basketball player (born 1963)

Medal record

Women's basketball

Representing Cuba

FIBA World Championship
Bronze medal – third place	1990 Malaysia	Team competition

Andrea Leonora Borrell Hernández (born November 10, 1963, in Las Villas, Villa Clara) is a retired female basketball player from Cuba. She twice competed for her native country at the Summer Olympics, finishing in fifth (1980) and in fourth place (1992) with the Women's National Team.
