= Cong Xuedi =

Chinese basketball player (born 1963)

Personal information
- Born: May 13, 1963 (age 63) Shanghai
Medal record
Women's basketball
Representing China
Olympic Games
Silver medal – second place	1992 Barcelona	Team competition
Bronze medal – third place	1984 Los Angeles	Team competition
Asian Games
Gold medal – first place	1986 Seoul	Team competition

Cong Xuedi (simplified Chinese: 丛学娣; traditional Chinese: 叢學娣; pinyin: Cóng Xuédì; born May 13, 1963, in Shanghai) is a former Chinese basketball player. With a height of 166 cm (5 ft 5 in), she served as point guard.

Cong enrolled in Shanghai Youth Team in 1981, and was admitted into Chinese national team in 1983. She competed at the 1984 Olympic Games and helped China win a bronze medal. She retired in 1989, but re-emerged in 1990 due to floundering performance of national team. She competed at 1992 Olympic Games in Barcelona and won a silver medal.

After retirement once again, Cong became the head coach of Shanghai Women's Basketball Team in 1995. From 2003, she has served as a coach in national second team.
