= María León (basketball) =

Cuban basketball player

María León (born 7 April 1967) is a Cuban former basketball player who competed in the 1992 Summer Olympics, in the 1996 Summer Olympics, and in the 2000 Summer Olympics.
