= Regla Hernández =

Cuban basketball player (born 1968)

Regla Hernández (born 27 April 1968) is a Cuban former basketball player who competed in the 1992 Summer Olympics.
