= Svetlana Antipova =

Russian basketball player

Olympic medal record

Women's basketball

Representing the Unified Team
Gold medal – first place	1992 Barcelona	Team competition

Svetlana Antipova (née Zaboluyeva, born 20 August 1966) is a Russian former basketball player who competed in the 1992 Summer Olympics and in the 1996 Summer Olympics.
