= Milayda Enríquez =

Cuban basketball player (born 1969)

Milayda Enríquez (born 7 October 1969) is a Cuban former basketball player who competed in the 1992 Summer Olympics, in the 1996 Summer Olympics, and in the 2000 Summer Olympics.
