= He Jun =

Chinese basketball player

Olympic medal record

Women's basketball

Representing China
Silver medal – second place	1992 Barcelona	Team competition

He Jun (simplified Chinese: 何军; traditional Chinese: 何軍; pinyin: Hé Jūn, born 3 March 1969) is a Chinese former basketball player who competed in the 1992 Summer Olympics and in the 1996 Summer Olympics.
