= Yelena Shvaybovich =

Belarusian basketball player

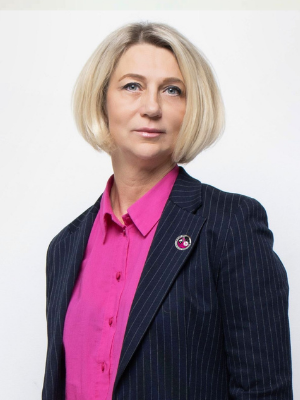

Personal information
- Born: 3 February 1966 (age 60) Minsk
Medals
Women's basketball
Representing the Unified Team
Olympic Games
| Gold medal – first place | 1992 Barcelona | Team competition |
Representing the Soviet Union
European Championships
| Gold medal – first place | 1989 Bulgaria | Team competition |

Yelena Shvaybovich (Belarusian: Алена Швайбовіч, née Ksenzhik, born 3 February 1966 in Minsk, Byelorussian SSR) is a Belarusian former basketball player who competed in the 1992 Summer Olympics. She also won EuroBasket 1989 Women as a member of Soviet Union women's national basketball team.
