= Iveta Bieliková =

Slovak basketball player (born 1966)

Personal information
- Born: August 17, 1966 (age 60) Ružomberok, Czechoslovakia
- Listed height: 1.71 m (5 ft 7 in)
- Listed weight: 58 kg (128 lb)
- Position: Point guard

Career history
- ????-2002: MBK Ružomberok
- 2002-2003: Lotos Gdynia
- 2003-2004: Sopron
- 2004-2005: Delta Košice
- 2005-2006: ŽBK Poprad

Iveta Bieliková (born August 17, 1966) is a former Slovak basketball player. She competed in the women's tournament at the 1992 Summer Olympics.
