= Dalia Henry =

Cuban basketball player

Dalia Henry (born 14 June 1965) is a Cuban former basketball player who competed in the 1992 Summer Olympics, in the 1996 Summer Olympics, and in the 2000 Summer Olympics. She was born in Havana.
