= Basketball at the 2003 Pan American Games =

- Venue: Palacio de los Deportes
- Dates: August 2–8, 2003
- Teams: 8

Medalists
Gold medal	Brazil
Silver medal	Dominican Republic
Bronze medal	Puerto Rico

This page shows the results of the basketball tournament at the 2003 Pan American Games, held in the Palacio de los Deportes Virgilio Travieso Soto in Santo Domingo, Dominican Republic from August 2 to August 8, 2003.

== Men's tournament ==
Group A	Group B
Brazil; Canada; Dominican Republic; Mexico	Argentina; Puerto Rico; United States; Uruguay

=== Preliminary round ===
==== Group A ====
Team	Pts	Pld	W	L	PF	PA	Diff
Brazil	6	3	3	0	271	227	+44
Dominican Republic	5	3	2	1	239	247	–8
Canada	4	3	1	2	267	252	+15
Mexico	3	3	0	3	209	260	–51

August 2, 2003

Brazil	92–78	Canada
Dominican Republic	72–67	Mexico

August 3, 2003

Brazil	87–72	Mexico
Dominican Republic	90–88	Canada

August 4, 2003

Canada	101–70	Mexico
Brazil	92–77	Dominican Republic

==== Group B ====
Team	Pts	Pld	W	L	PF	PA	Diff
Puerto Rico	5	3	2	1	242	249	–7
United States	5	3	2	1	239	237	+2
Uruguay	4	3	1	2	228	244	–16
Argentina	3	3	1	2	252	231	+21

August 2, 2003

Puerto Rico	89–72	Uruguay
United States	80–79	Argentina

August 3, 2003

Uruguay	84–81	Argentina
Puerto Rico	86–85	United States

August 4, 2003

United States	74–72	Uruguay
Argentina	92–67	Puerto Rico

=== Knockout stages ===
5-8th place
2003-08-06 – 09:00
Argentina	88
Canada	86
2003-08-06 – 11:00
Mexico	95
Uruguay	86

5th place
2003-08-07 – 11:00
Argentina	90
Mexico	95
7th place
2003-08-07 – 09:00
Canada	83
Uruguay	52

Semi-finals
August 6, 2003 – 19:00
Brazil	92
United States	80
August 6, 2003 – 21:00
Dominican Republic	79
Puerto Rico	65

Final
August 7, 2003 – 21:00
Brazil	89
Dominican Republic	62
Third place
August 7, 2003 – 19:00
United States	70
Puerto Rico	76

=== Final standings ===
Rank	TEAM	Record	PF : PA
	Brazil	5 – 0	452 : 369
	Dominican Republic	3 – 2	380 : 401
	Puerto Rico	3 – 2	383 : 398
4.	United States	2 – 3	389 : 405
5.	Mexico	2 – 3	399 : 436
6.	Argentina	2 – 3	430 : 412
7.	Canada	2 – 3	436 : 392
8.	Uruguay	1 – 4	366 : 422

=== Awards ===
==== Topscorer ====
- (Uruguay) Nicolas Mazzarino 91 pts (18.2 ppg)

2003 Pan American Games winners

Brazil
Fourth title

=== Team Rosters ===
(Argentina) ARGENTINA

- Román González
- Bruno Labaque
- Patricio Prato
- Martin Leiva
- Paolo Quinteros
- Julio Mazzaro
- Pablo Prigioni
- Matías Pelletieri
- Diego Alba
- Diego Guaita
- Diego Cavaco
- Matías Sandes

Head coach:

- Fernando Duró

(Brazil) BRAZIL

- Marcelinho Machado
- Arnaldinho Filho
- Dede Barbosa
- Valtinho Silva
- Murilo da Rosa
- Demétrius Ferraciu
- Alex Garcia
- Anderson Varejão
- Guilherme Giovannoni
- Tiago Splitter
- André Pereira
- Renato Pinto

Head coach:

- Lula Ferreira

(Canada) CANADA

- Randy Nohr
- Rowan Barrett
- Prosper Karangwa
- Greg Newton
- Shawn Swords
- Novell Thomas
- Jesse Young
- Peter Guarasci
- Greg Francis
- Andy Kwiatkowski
- Juan Mendez
- Mike King

Head coach:

- Jay Triano

(Dominican Republic) DOMINICAN REPUBLIC

- José Vargas
- Franklin Western
- Carlos Payano
- Carlos Paniagua
- Otto Ramírez
- Miguel Angel Pichardo
- Amaury Filion
- Luis Flores
- Jack Michael Martínez
- Carlos Morban
- Jeffrey Greer
- Francisco García

Head coach:

- Héctor Báez

(Mexico) MEXICO

- Anthony Norwood
- Adam Parada
- David Meza
- Horacio Llamas
- Omar López
- Ramsés Benítez
- Víctor Mariscal
- Omar Quintero
- Víctor Ávila
- Enrique Zúñiga
- Jorge Rochín
- David Crouse

Head coach:

- Guillermo Vecchio

(Puerto Rico) PUERTO RICO

- Rick Apodaca
- Carlos Arroyo
- Larry Ayuso
- Sharif Fajardo
- Bobby Joe Hatton
- Antonio Latimer
- Jorge Rivera
- Daniel Santiago
- Orlando Santiago
- Alejandro Carmona
- Peter John Ramos
- Richie Dalmau

Head coach:

- Julio Toro

(United States) UNITED STATES

- Rickey Paulding
- Chris Hill
- Ben Gordon
- Andre Barrett
- Blake Stepp
- Luke Jackson
- Chuck Hayes
- Brandon Mouton
- Arthur Johnson
- Emeka Okafor
- Ike Diogu
- Josh Childress

Head coach:

- Tom Izzo

(Uruguay) URUGUAY

- Alejandro Pérez
- Sebastián Leguizamón
- Gastón Páez
- Nicolás Mazzarino
- Alejandro Muro
- Emiliano Taboada
- Mauricio Aguiar
- Trelonnie Owens
- Leandro García Morales
- Gustavo Szczygielski
- Luis Silveira
- Esteban Batista

Head coach:

- Néstor García

== Women's tournament ==
=== Preliminary round Robin ===
Team	Pts	Pld	W	L	PF	PA	Diff
Cuba	9	5	4	1	400	319	+44
Brazil	9	5	4	1	393	287	+106
United States	9	5	4	1	397	333	+64
Canada	7	5	2	3	315	307	+8
Argentina	6	5	1	4	311	376	–65
Dominican Republic	5	5	0	5	256	450	–194

August 2, 2003

Cuba	84–62	United States
Brazil	62–53	Canada
Argentina	76–52	Dominican Republic

August 3, 2003

Brazil	86–43	Argentina
United States	56–53	Canada
Cuba	82–55	Dominican Republic

August 4, 2003

Cuba	83–57	Argentina
United States	77–64	Brazil
Canada	81–51	Dominican Republic

August 5, 2003

United States	93–78	Argentina
Cuba	81–66	Canada
Brazil	102–44	Dominican Republic

August 6, 2003

Brazil	79–70	Cuba
Canada	62–57	Argentina
United States	109–54	Dominican Republic

=== Play-offs ===
Semi-finals
August 7, 2003 – 17:00
United States	75
Brazil	69
August 7, 2003 – 19:00
Cuba	58
Canada	49

Final
August 8, 2003 – 19:00
United States	64
Cuba	75
Third place
August 8, 2003 – 17:00
Brazil	57
Canada	46

=== Final standings ===
Rank	TEAM	Record	PF : PA
	Cuba	6 – 1	533 : 432
	United States	5 – 2	536 : 477
	Brazil	5 – 2	519 : 408
4.	Canada	2 – 5	410 : 422
5.	Argentina	1 – 4	311 : 376
6.	Dominican Republic	0 – 5	256 : 450

=== Awards ===
2003 Pan American Games winners

Cuba
Third title

=== Team Rosters ===
(Canada) CANADA

- Cal Bouchard
- Claudia Brassard
- Leighann Doan
- Carolyn Ganes
- Isabelle Grenier
- Michelle Hendry
- Nikki Johnson
- Teresa Kliendienst
- Susan Murray
- Dianne Norman
- Kim Smith
- Shona Thorburn

Head coach:

- Allison McNeill

(United States) UNITED STATES

- Jenni Benningfield
- Rebekkah Brunson
- Jamie Carey
- Roneeka Hodges
- Laurie Koehn
- Janel McCarville
- Loree Moore
- Nicole Powell
- Ann Strother
- Lindsay Taylor
- Iciss Tillis
- Barbara Turner

Head coach:

- Debbie Ryan

(Brazil) BRAZIL

- Adriana Moisés
- Alessandra Santos de Oliveira
- Cíntia Santos
- Jacqueline Godoy
- Jucimara Dantas
- Kelly Santos
- Lilian Gonçalves
- Micaela Jacintho
- Renata Oliveira
- Silvinha Luz
- Soeli Zakrzeski
- Vivian Lopes

Head coach:

- Antonio Carlos Barbosa
