= Basketball at the 1991 Mediterranean Games =

The basketball tournament at the 1991 Mediterranean Games was held in Athens, Greece.

== Men ==
=== Standings ===
Mj.	Team
1.	Italy
2.	Greece
3.	France
4.	Turkey
5.	Yugoslavia
6.	Spain
7.	Egypt
8.	Albania

=== Rosters ===
-	Team	Roster
1	Italy	Italy under 23; Fabrizio Ambrassa, Emiliano Busca, Paolo Conti, Alessandro De Pol, Alessandro Frosini, Gregor Fučka, Paolo Moretti, Andrea Niccolai, Flavio Portaluppi, Massimiliano Rizzo, Alberto Rossini, Gustavo Tolotti, Coach. Mario Blasone
2	Greece	Greece under 26; Dinos Angelidis, Kostas Gkagkaoudakis, Aris Cholopoulos, Aggelos Koronios, Evangelos Logothetis, Kostas Moraitis, Nikos Boudouris, Giannis Mylonas, Christos Myriounis, Nikos Oikonomou, Giannis Papagiannis, Kostas Tampakis, Coach. Giorgos Poestos
3	France	France under 22; Jimmy Vérove, Stéphane Risacher, Régis Racine, Thierry Zaire, Bruno Coqueran, Olivier Allinéi, Thierry Gadou, Jean-Gael Percevaut, Laurent Bernard, Arsène Ade-Mensah, Leroy John
4	Turkey	Turkey under 26; Hüsnü Çakırgil, Haluk Yıldırım, Cenk Renda, Ömer Saybir, Serdar Apaydın, Tamer Oyguç, Lutfi Arıboğan, Engin Bayav, Orhun Ene, Murat Evliyaoğlu, Ufuk Sarıca, Yusuf Erboy. Coach. Mehmet Baturalp
5	Yugoslavia	(Socialist Federal Republic of Yugoslavia) Yugoslavia under 21; Dejan Bodiroga, Dragan Tarlac, Zeljko Rebraca, Veljko Mršić, Nikola Lončar, Teo Čizmić, Mlađan Šilobad, Velibor Radović, Gavrilo Pajović, Željko Topalović, Coach.
6	Spain	Spain under 22; Nacho Azofra, Carlos Ruf, Pérez Ramos, Antonio Pedrera, Joan Peñarroya, Jordi Singla, Nacho Rodríguez, Tomás Jofresa, Antonio Medianero, Xavier Ruiz, Iván Pardo, Miguel Cabral
7	Egypt	(Egypt)
8	Albania	Albania; Gazmend Çaçi, Fatmir Cuka, Artan Kuqo, Aleksandër Damo, Astrit Zaganjori, Viron Sauli, Enri Zaçe, Pandush Palko, Arben Pasha, Ardjan Skënderi, Demion Qirjaqi, Coach. Astrit Greva

== Women ==
=== Standings ===
Mj.	Team
1.	Spain
2.	France
3.	Greece
4.	Italy
5.	Albania

=== Rosters ===
-	Team	Roster
1	Spain	(Spain) Spain; Patricia Hernández, Carolina Mújica, Blanca Ares, Piluca Alonso, Mónica Pulgar, Margarita Geuer, Almudena Vara, Ana Álvaro, Mónica Messa, Marina Ferragut, Elisabeth Cebrián, Carlota Castrejana, Coach. Chema Buceta
2	France	France; Corinne Benintendi, Martine Campi, Amy Cissé, Paoline Ekambi, Isabelle Fijalkowski, Carole Force, Michèle Jeanne, Lætitia Moussard, Odile Santaniello, Halima Soussi, Yannick Souvré, Stéphanie Vivenot
3	Greece	Greece
4	Italy	Italy; Angela Adamoli, Samantha Gori, Ivana Donadel, Laura Gori, Cristina L'Imperio, Elena Paparazzo, Elena Rodighiero, Angela Arcangeli, Stefania Stanzani, Stefania De Michele, Simona Sarni, Coach. Franco Novarina
5	Albania	Albania; Mirza Alibegaj, Laonela Dauti, Klodeta Dibra, Violeta Dobro, Mimoza Fusha, Elsa Goga, Miranda Guxho, Vjollca Jaupi, Aida Nakolli, Eleni Ruçi, Lida Shehu, Shqiponja Tafa, Coach. Petrit Stefa
