= Basketball at the 1993 Mediterranean Games =

The basketball tournament at the 1993 Mediterranean Games was held in Languedoc-Roussillon, France.

== Men ==
=== Medlaists ===
Event	Gold	Silver	Bronze
Men	Italy	Croatia	France

=== Rosters ===
-	Team	Roster
1	Italy	(Italy) Italy; Giuseppe Bosa, Flavio Carera, Claudio Coldebella, Ferdinando Gentile, Massimo Iacopini, Paolo Moretti, Carlton Myers, Riccardo Pittis, Alberto Rossini, Stefano Rusconi, Romeo Sacchetti, Alberto Tonut, Coach. Ettore Messina
2	Croatia	Croatia; Vladan Alanovic, Franjo Arapovic, Danko Cvjeticanin, Alan Gregov, Arijan Komazec, Emilio Kovačić, Veljko Mrsic, Velimir Perasovic, Dino Rada, Zan Tabak, Stojko Vrankovic, Ivica Zuric, Coach. Mirko Novosel
3	France	France; Jimmy Vérove, Georges Adams, Oliver Allinei, Jim Bilba, Yann Bonato, Bruno Coqueran, Felix Courtinard, Frederic Forte, Thierry Gadou, Stéphane Ostrowski, Antoine Rigaudeau, Christophe Soule
4	Greece	Greece under 26; Theodoros Asteriadis, Dimitris Avdalas, Fotis Gkousgkouris, Aris Cholopoulos, Giorgos Limniatis, Vangelis Logothetis, Achilleas Mamatziolas, Giorgos Balogiannis, Nikos Boudouris, Michalis Pournaras, Tzanis Stavrakopoulos, Kostas Tampakis, Coach. Giorgos Tsitskaris
5	Slovenia	Slovenia; Roman Horvat, Marko Tušek, Jaka Daneu, Darko Mirt, Primož Bačar, Jure Zdovc, Boštjan Leban, Teoman Alibegović, Boris Gorenc, Marijan Kraljević, Slavko Kotnik, Ales Kunc, Coach. Janez Drvarič
6	Spain	Spain; Daniel Álvarez, Javier González, Jordi Pardo, Carlos Ruf, Xavi Fernández, Santiago Aldama, Francisco José Murcia, Juan Carlos Barros, Nacho Azofra, Juan Rosa
7	Bosnia and Herzegovina	Bosnia and Herzegovina; Sabahudin Bilalović, Mario Primorac, Samir Avdić, Senad Begović, Gordan Firić, Emir Mutapčić, Emir Halimić, Adis Bečiragić, Ilijas Mašnić, Samir Selesković
8	Turkey	Turkey under 21; Murat Konuk, Gökhan Günay, Ceyhan Nadirhan, Haluk Yıldırım, Tolga Tekinalp, İbrahim Kutluay, Şemsettin Baş, Burak Sezgin, Oktay Öztürk, Serdar Çağlan, Zeki Güley, Alper Yılmaz, Coach. Efe Aydan
9	Algeria	Algeria

== Women ==
=== Medalists ===
Event	Gold	Silver	Bronze
Women	Bosnia and Herzegovina	Italy	Spain

=== Rosters ===
-	Team	Roster
1	Bosnia and Herzegovina	Bosnia and Herzegovina; Vesna Bajkuša, Rankica Šarenac, Mara Lakić, Tima Džebo, Silvana Mirvić, Razija Mujanović, Vera Šarić, Amra Zupčević, Naida Hot Sušić
2	Italy	Italy; Elena Paparazzo, Nicoletta Caselin, Angela Adamoli, Stefania Salvemini, Viviana Ballabio, Cristiana Federighi, Angela Arcangeli, Catarina Pollini, Stefania Stanzani, Renata Zocco, Pina Tufano, Chiara Strazzabosco, Coach. Franco Novarina.
3	Spain	Spain; Laura Grande, María Remiro, Blanca Ares, Mar Xantal, Piluca Alonso, Nieves Lobón, Pilar Valero, Ana Álvaro, Carmen González, Marina Ferragut, Elisabeth Cebrián, Paloma Sánchez, Coach. Manuel Coloma.
4	Slovenia	Slovenia; Mojca Ciglar, Polona Dornik, Sabina Felc, Katica Krivic, Zora Malacko, Mateja Mrzlikar, Nada Pocrnjic, Damjanka Racic, Nevenka Topalovic, Sergeja Zupan, Ursa Zen
5	France	France; Martine Campi, Sabine Chevalier, Amy Cissé, Paoline Ekambi, Isabelle Fijalkowski, Carole Force, Lætitia Moussard, Odile Santaniello, Yannick Souvré, Barbara Weistroffer, Stéphanie Vivenot, Corinne Zago
6	Greece	Greece; Athina Petridi, Sofia Kligkopoulou, Afendra Papadimou, Anthi Papailia, Vivi Diavolemenou, Roula Bazima, Katerina Petahti, Sonia Dafkou, Panagiota Kourti, Dimitra Papamichail, Alexia Trialoni
7	Turkey	Turkey; Serap Köz, Derya Taşçı Özyer, Çelen Kılınç, Handan Özbek, Canan Nilgün Bakır, Didem Kantarcı, Arzu Özyiğit, Belgin Aktan, Funda Kurtyılmaz, Hülya Erdem, Filiz Yükrük, Coach. Efe Aydan
