= Medal winners in Spain women's national basketball team =

== Medal winners in Spain women's national basketball team ==
Full list of the 69 medal winners while playing in Spain women's national basketball team since 1993 (first medal): Olympic Games, World Cups and EuroBaskets.

	Meaning
OL	Summer Olympics
WC	World Cup / World Championship
EB	EuroBasket / European Championship

Note: updated to 2026 FIBA Women's Basketball World Cup

Player	Total	26 WC	25 EB	23 EB	19 EB	18 WC	17 EB	16 OL	15 EB	14 WC	13 EB	10 WC	09 EB	07 EB	05 EB	03 EB	01 EB	93 EB
Laia Palau	12				Gold medal	Bronze medal	Gold medal	Silver medal	Bronze medal	Silver medal	Gold medal	Bronze medal	Bronze medal	Silver medal	Bronze medal	Bronze medal		
Alba Torrens	11	Bronze medal	Silver medal	Silver medal		Bronze medal	Gold medal	Silver medal	Bronze medal	Silver medal	Gold medal	Bronze medal	Bronze medal					
Silvia Domínguez	9			Silver medal	Gold medal	Bronze medal	Gold medal	Silver medal	Bronze medal	Silver medal	Gold medal		Bronze medal					
Laura Nicholls	9				Gold medal	Bronze medal	Gold medal	Silver medal	Bronze medal	Silver medal	Gold medal	Bronze medal	Bronze medal					
Anna Cruz	8				Gold medal	Bronze medal	Gold medal	Silver medal	Bronze medal	Silver medal		Bronze medal	Bronze medal					
Laura Gil	8			Silver medal	Gold medal	Bronze medal	Gold medal	Silver medal	Bronze medal	Silver medal	Gold medal							
Lucila Pascua	8							Silver medal	Bronze medal	Silver medal		Bronze medal	Bronze medal	Silver medal	Bronze medal	Bronze medal		
Marta Xargay	7				Gold medal	Bronze medal	Gold medal	Silver medal	Bronze medal	Silver medal	Gold medal							
Elisa Aguilar	6										Gold medal	Bronze medal	Bronze medal	Silver medal	Bronze medal		Bronze medal	
Amaya Valdemoro	6										Gold medal	Bronze medal	Bronze medal	Silver medal	Bronze medal	Bronze medal		
Nuria Martínez	6								Bronze medal	Silver medal		Bronze medal		Silver medal	Bronze medal	Bronze medal		
Sancho Lyttle	4						Gold medal			Silver medal	Gold medal	Bronze medal						
Queralt Casas	4			Silver medal	Gold medal	Bronze medal					Gold medal							
Cristina Ouviña	4			Silver medal	Gold medal	Bronze medal					Gold medal							
Leonor Rodríguez	4			Silver medal			Gold medal	Silver medal		Silver medal								
Leticia Romero	4						Gold medal	Silver medal	Bronze medal	Silver medal								
Cindy Lima	4										Gold medal	Bronze medal	Bronze medal	Silver medal				
Astou Ndour	4				Gold medal	Bronze medal		Silver medal	Bronze medal									
Marina Ferragut	4														Bronze medal	Bronze medal	Bronze medal	Gold medal
Anna Montañana	4											Bronze medal	Bronze medal	Silver medal	Bronze medal			
María Conde	3	Bronze medal		Silver medal			Gold medal											
Raquel Carrera	3	Bronze medal	Silver medal	Silver medal														
Paula Ginzo	3	Bronze medal	Silver medal	Silver medal														
Betty Cebrián	3															Bronze medal	Bronze medal	Gold medal
Laura Camps	3													Silver medal	Bronze medal	Bronze medal		
Marta Fernández	3											Bronze medal			Bronze medal	Bronze medal		
Andrea Vilaró	2		Silver medal		Gold medal													
Mar Xantal	2														Bronze medal			Gold medal
Tamara Abalde	2				Gold medal								Bronze medal					
Beatriz Sánchez	2					Bronze medal	Gold medal											
Laura Quevedo	2			Silver medal				Silver medal										
Marta Zurro	2													Silver medal			Bronze medal	
Isabel Sánchez	2												Bronze medal	Silver medal				
Maite Cazorla	2	Bronze medal		Silver medal														
Elena Buenavida	2	Bronze medal	Silver medal															
Awa Fam	2	Bronze medal	Silver medal															
Iyana Martín	2	Bronze medal	Silver medal															
Mariona Ortiz	2	Bronze medal	Silver medal															
Helena Pueyo	2	Bronze medal	Silver medal															
Begoña García	2															Bronze medal	Bronze medal	
Ingrid Pons	2															Bronze medal	Bronze medal	
Rosi Sánchez	2															Bronze medal	Bronze medal	
Sandra Gallego	2														Bronze medal		Bronze medal	
Player	Total	26 WC	25 EB	23 EB	19 EB	18 WC	17 EB	16 OL	15 EB	14 WC	13 EB	10 WC	09 EB	07 EB	05 EB	03 EB	01 EB	93 EB
Piluca Alonso	1																	Gold medal
Ana Belén Álvaro	1																	Gold medal
Blanca Ares	1																	Gold medal
Wonny Geuer	1																	Gold medal
Laura Grande	1																	Gold medal
Mónica Messa	1																	Gold medal
Carolina Mújica	1																	Gold medal
Paloma Sánchez	1																	Gold medal
Pilar Valero	1																	Gold medal
María Pina	1				Gold medal													
Irene Herradas	1													Silver medal				
Silvia Morales	1													Silver medal				
Lola Pendande	1			Silver medal														
María Araújo	1		Silver medal															
Aina Ayuso	1		Silver medal															
Irati Etxarri	1		Silver medal															
Nieves Anula	1																Bronze medal	
Alicia López	1																Bronze medal	
Lidia Mirchandani	1																Bronze medal	
Lourdes Peláez	1																Bronze medal	
Paula Segui	1															Bronze medal		
Eva Montesdeoca	1														Bronze medal			
Laura Herrera	1								Bronze medal									
Belén Arrojo	1					Bronze medal												
Megan DiLeo	1	Bronze medal																
Alicia Flórez	1	Bronze medal																
Player	Total	26 WC	25 EB	23 EB	19 EB	18 WC	17 EB	16 OL	15 EB	14 WC	13 EB	10 WC	09 EB	07 EB	05 EB	03 EB	01 EB	93 EB

== See also ==
- Spain women's national basketball team
- Spanish Basketball Federation
- Basketball at the Summer Olympics
- FIBA Women's Basketball World Cup
- EuroBasket Women
