= Spain women's national basketball team head to head =

Results of Spain women's national basketball team since 1963, as recognized by the Spanish Basketball Federation: Olympic Games, World Cups, EuroBaskets and the respective qualifying tournaments, as well as two editions of the Mediterranean Games when the A-team was involved. Also included, friendly games against national teams.

Key
AF	FIBA Africa	OL	Summer Olympics	1R	First Round	QF	Quarter-final
AM	FIBA Americas	WC	World Cup / World Championship	2R	Second Round	SF	Semifinal
AS	FIBA Asia	EB	EuroBasket Women / European Championship	CR	Classification Round	3P	Bronze Match
EU	FIBA Europe	MG	Mediterranean Games			F	Final
OC	FIBA Oceania	QL	Qualifying Tournament				

Note: updated through 13 September 2026
† Countries no longer competing

Opponent	Z	Pld	W	L	%	PF	PA	PD	Details
France	EU	69	35	34	.507	4487	4498	-11	Extended content 68-72 2025 Friendly La Línea; 65-64 2025 EB SF Piraeus (GRE); 64-67 2020 OL QF Saitama (JPN)); 75-80 2021 Friendly Paris (FRA); 72-61 2021 Friendly Málaga; 45-72 2021 Friendly Toulouse (FRA); 57-66 2021 Friendly Toulouse (FRA); 58-65 2019 Friendly Palencia; 51-55 2019 Friendly Zamora; 86-66 2019 EB F Riga (LAT); 65-54 2018 Friendly Valencia; 72-55 2017 EB F Prague (CZE); 56-65 2017 Friendly Mulhouse (FRA); 58-63 2015 EB SF Budapest (HUN); 70-69 2013 EB F Orchies (FRA); 56-67 2013 Friendly Évry (FRA); 55-79 2011 EB 2R Katowice (POL); 74-71 2010 WC QF Karlovy Vary (CZE); 59-65 2010 Friendly Lugo; 63-53 2007 EB 2R Ortona (ITA); 73-67 2007 Friendly Riga (LAT); 66-82 2006 Friendly Vannes (FRA); 69-59 2002 WC CR Nanjing (CHN); 67-51 2002 Friendly Vilagarcia Arousa; 64-70 2001 EB 1R Orléans (FRA); 64-63 1998 Friendly Cádiz; 66-61 1998 Friendly San Fernando; 84-61 1997 Friendly Cosenza (ITA); 68-62 1997 Friendly San Fernando; 55-67 1997 Friendly Cádiz; 54-48 1995 Friendly San Fernando; 76-65 1995 Friendly Sanlúcar Barrameda; 67-51 1994 Friendly Madrid; 76-71 1993 MG MR Lattes (FRA); 63-53 1993 EB F Perugia (ITA); 59-63 1993 Friendly Arlessortech (FRA); 59-53 1993 Friendly Frontignan (FRA); 77-73 1991 MG MR Thessaloniki (GRE); 68-82 1990 Friendly Pozuelo; 68-69 1990 Friendly Toulouse (FRA); 74-69 1989 Friendly Orleans (FRA); 64-59 1988 Friendly Draguinan (FRA); 76-77 1988 Friendly Roquebrune (FRA); 50-55 1989 EB-QL Naantali (FIN); 70-65 1988 Friendly Gdansk (POL); 70-55 1987 Friendly Ferrol; 78-59 1987 Friendly Ferrol; 47-64 1986 Friendly Cádiz; 46-54 1986 Friendly Constanza (ROU); 60-63 1986 Friendly Orléans (FRA); 74-70 1986 Friendly Orléans (FRA); 72-57 1986 Friendly Valencia; 62-57 1986 Friendly Alcázar de San Juan; 64-65 1985 Friendly Cádiz; 48-61 1985 Friendly Barbate; 68-62 1985 Friendly Barbate; 84-86 1985 Friendly Messina (ITA); 56-66 1985 Friendly Chartres (FRA); 61-69 1984 Friendly Vilagarcia Arous; 66-60 1984 Friendly Ferrol; 70-78 1984 Friendly Messina (ITA); 56-54 1984 Friendly Messina (ITA); 69-75 1982 Friendly Orléans (FRA); 75-55 1980 EB CR Banjaluka (BIH); 80-57 1980 Friendly Paris (FRA); 61-81 1978 Friendly Vicennes (FRA); 62-98 1978 Friendly Montigny (FRA); 67-78 1974 Friendly Cádiz; 45-69 1970 EB-QL Girona
Canada	AM	38	31	7	.816	2639	2245	+394	Extended content 68-48 2024 Friendly Segovia; 61-48 2024 Friendly Charleroi (BEL); 60-55 2024 OL-QL Sopron (HUN); 76-66 2020 OL 1R Saitama (JPN)); 87-59 2019 Friendly Wevelgem (BEL); 68-53 2018 WC QF Tenerife; 64-42 2017 Friendly Torrelavega; 73-60 2016 OL 1R Rio de Janeiro (BRA); 77-54 2016 Friendly Palencia; 68-57 2015 Friendly Logroño; 66-46 2014 Friendly Logroño; 61-55 2013 Friendly Évry (FRA); 66-59 2011 Friendly Segovia; 85-57 2006 WC 2R São Paulo (BRA); 80-61 2006 Friendly São Paulo (BRA); 75-57 2006 Friendly Aljaraque; 87-63 2005 Friendly Andenne (BEL); 79-48 2002 Friendly Vilagarcia Arousa; 77-71 1998 Friendly Logroño; 83-63 1997 Friendly Cosenza (ITA); 74-66 1995 Friendly San Fernando; 65-70 1994 WC CR Sydney (AUS); 70-69 1992 Friendly Consuegra; 65-51 1992 Friendly El Escorial; 50-64 1991 Friendly Montreal (CAN); 62-69 1991 Friendly Quebec (CAN); 57-60 1991 Friendly Kingston (CAN); 57-50 1991 Friendly Sudbury (CAN); 57-72 1991 Friendly Toronto (CAN); 68-63 1991 Friendly Ottawa (CAN); 71-63 1991 Friendly Madrid; 77-48 1991 Friendly Madrid; 82-65 1991 Friendly Madrid; 65-59 1991 Friendly Madrid; 66-52 1987 Friendly Ferrol; 56-71 1986 Friendly El Masnou; 49-68 1986 Friendly Castelldefels; 87-63 1976 Friendly Sevilla
Cuba	AM	36	17	19	.472	2624	2692	-68	Extended content 83-40 2016 Friendly Palencia; 73-46 2014 Friendly Logroño; 61-50 2011 Friendly Segovia; 65-57 2009 Friendly Vigo; 81-70 2009 Friendly Santiago Compostela; 67-53 2009 Friendly Santiago Compostela; 82-68 2008 OL-QL Madrid; 79-67 2002 Friendly Vilagarcia Arousa; 80-63 1998 WC CR Berlin (GER); 80-83 1995 Friendly Madrid; 81-72 1995 Friendly Madrid; 65-68 1994 WC 2R Sydney (AUS); 62-81 1993 Friendly Madrid; 63-71 1993 Friendly Madrid; 91-75 1993 Friendly Madrid; 101-97 1992 Friendly Madrid; 79-69 1992 Friendly Manzanares; 90-81 1991 Friendly Madrid; 81-66 1991 Friendly Pozuelo; 85-72 1990 Friendly Madrid; 70-74 1990 Friendly Madrid; 87-90 1989 Friendly Gdansk (POL); 85-103 1983 Friendly Castelldefels; 69-84 1983 Friendly Castelldefels; 64-81 1982 Friendly Orléans (FRA); 79-84 1982 Friendly Ferrol; 72-105 1980 Friendly Mataro; 49-88 1980 Friendly Catellar del Vallès; 67-110 1980 Friendly Gerona; 67-79 1979 Friendly Vigo; 63-82 1979 Friendly Zamora; 71-69 1979 Friendly Palma Mallorca; 55-71 1974 Friendly Cuenca; 66-74 1974 Friendly Albacete; 61-79 1974 Friendly Cádiz; 50-70 1969 Friendly Madrid
China	AS	34	22	12	.647	2517	2380	+137	Extended content 72-71 2026 Friendly Zaragoza; 90-89 2024 OL 1R Lille (FRA); 70-46 2024 Friendly Vigo; 76-60 2023 Friendly Vigo; 62-64 2020 OL-QL Belgrade (SRB); 69-46 2019 Friendly Wevelgem (BEL); 68-58 2017 Friendly San Fernando; 89-68 2016 OL 1R Rio de Janeiro (BRA); 77-43 2016 OL-QL Nantes (FRA); 71-55 2014 WC QF Istanbul (TUR); 58-55 2014 Friendly Minsk (BLR); 64-67 2008 OL 1R Beijing (CHN); 64-60 2008 Friendly Alcobendas; 83-59 2007 Friendly Pinto; 58-62 2007 Friendly Pinto; 76-83 2007 Friendly Riga (LAT); 71-66 2006 Friendly São Paulo (BRA); 79-66 2006 Friendly Aljaraque; 75-67 2004 OL 1R Athens (GRE); 91-72 2002 WC CR Nanjing (CHN); 59-72 2002 WC 2R Suzhou (CHN); 72-55 1998 WC 1R Rotenburg (GER); 76-59 1995 Friendly Segovia; 76-60 1994 WC 2R Sydney (AUS); 63-66 1992 OL 1R Barcelona; 98-77 1989 Friendly St Jean de Bray; 83-94 1989 Friendly Pescara (ITA); 87-85 1989 Friendly Palma Mallorca; 79-69 1989 Friendly Ibiza; 62-101 1988 OL-QL Singapore (SIN); 73-107 1987 Friendly Sofia (BUL); 94-103 1987 Friendly Gdansk (POL); 55-86 1978 Friendly Barcelona; 77-89 1978 Friendly Gramanet
Russia	EU	32	16	16	.500	2156	2191	-35	Extended content 74-78 2021 EB CR Valencia; 78-54 2019 EB QF Belgrade (SRB); 61-70 2019 Friendly Zaragoza; 66-57 2015 EB 2R Győr (HUN); 61-49 2015 Friendly Santander; 77-72 2013 EB 1R Vannes (FRA); 67-76 2010 WC 2R Brno (CZE); 61-77 2009 EB SF Riga (LAT); 71-75 2009 Friendly Kaunas (LTU); 65-84 2008 OL QF Beijing (CHN); 90-73 2008 Friendly Moscow (RUS); 68-74 2007 EB F Chieti (ITA); 49-64 2007 EB 2R Ortona (ITA); 56-60 2006 WC QF São Paulo (BRA); 55-53 2006 Friendly Aljaraque; 81-77 2005 EB 1R Ismir (TUR); 55-53 2004 Friendly Valencia; 71-78 2003 EB SF Patras (GRE); 64-61 2003 EB 1R Amaliada (GRE); 59-74 2001 EB SF Le Mans (FRA); 58-56 2000 Friendly Torrelavega; 70-72 1998 WC 1R Rotenburg (GER); 82-77 1997 EB CR Budapest (HUN); 60-66 1996 Friendly Toulouse (FRA); 73-69 1993 Friendly Madrid; 64-59 1993 Friendly Madrid; 77-59 1993 Friendly Madrid; 59-88 1992 Friendly Madrid; 68-77 1992 Friendly Madrid; 68-70 1992 Friendly Yepes; 69-64 1992 Friendly Daimiel; 79-75 1992 Friendly Madrid
Italy	EU	32	15	17	.469	2175	2208	-33	Extended content 56-68 2026 WC-QL San Juan (PUR); 61-77 2025 Friendly La Línea; 57-42 2025 Friendly Inca; 55-44 2023 Friendly Vigo; 54-46 2022 Friendly Cividale del Friuli (ITA); 60-49 2022 Friendly Melilla; 66-62 2017 Friendly Mulhouse (FRA); 71-59 2013 EB 1R Vannes (FRA); 61-42 2009 EB QF Riga (LAT); 79-64 2007 EB 2R Ortona (ITA); 54-61 1999 EB-QL Daruvar (CRO); 75-72 1997 Friendly Cosenza (ITA); 49-59 1993 MG MR Lattes (FRA); 56-66 1993 EB 1R Perugia (ITA); 92-80 1992 OL CR Barcelona; 76-63 1991 MG MR Thessaloniki (GRE); 78-65 1991 Friendly Madrid; 62-79 1991 Friendly Segovia; 93-82 1991 Friendly Madrid; 94-99 1989 Friendly Pescara (ITA); 73-64 1988 Friendly Rome (ITA); 87-102 1987 EB CR Cádiz; 83-73 1987 EB 1R Pto Santa Maria; 70-79 1987 Friendly L'Aquila (ITA); 46-77 1985 EB 1R Treviso (ITA); 73-79 1985 Friendly Messina (ITA); 63-70 1984 Friendly Messina (ITA); 62-74 1983 Friendly Vukovar (CRO); 80-92 1983 EB-QL Treviso (ITA); 72-79 1982 Friendly Orléans (FRA); 56-74 1980 EB CR Banjaluka (BIH); 61-66 1978 EB 1R Torun (POL)
Poland	EU	31	22	9	.710	2295	2054	+241	Extended content 69-47 2017 Friendly San Fernando; 60-35 2015 Friendly Logroño; 78-63 2011 EB 1R Katowice (POL); 67-55 2009 EB 2R Riga (LAT); 68-64 2009 Friendly Istanbul (TUR); 87-53 2004 Friendly Salamanca; 87-81 2003 EB 3P Patras (GRE); 93-75 2002 Friendly León; 78-68 2001 EB 1R Orléans (FRA); 71-61 1998 Friendly Autol; 92-68 1993 EB 1R Perugia (ITA); 92-58 1992 Friendly Puerto Real; 69-52 1992 Friendly Sanlucar Barrame; 91-46 1992 Friendly Cádiz; 90-54 1991 Friendly Pozuelo; 75-74 1990 Friendly Gdansk (POL); 86-66 1989 Friendly Gdansk (POL); 85-89 1988 Friendly Gdansk (POL); 73-71 1988 Friendly Guadalajara; 75-74 1988 Friendly Albacete; 71-73 1988 Friendly Talavera; 72-70 1987 Friendly Sofia (BUL); 61-73 1987 Friendly Gdansk (POL); 62-41 1987 Friendly Gdansk (POL); 77-85 1986 Friendly Jerez Frontera; 48-58 1986 Friendly Constanza (ROU); 70-65 1985 EB 1R Treviso (ITA); 81-93 1985 Friendly Granville (FRA); 59-92 1983 EB 1R Miskolc (HUN); 58-66 1983 Friendly Osijek (HUN); 50-84 1974 EB 1R Nuoro (ITA)
Belgium	EU	31	24	7	.774	2325	1923	+402	Extended content 95-67 2026 Friendly Santa Cruz de Tenerife; 65-67 2025 EB F Piraeus (GRE); 66-79 2024 OL QF Paris (FRA); 58-76 2024 Friendly Charleroi (BEL); 58-64 2023 EB F Ljubljana (SLO); 72-54 2023 Friendly Córdoba; 79-70 2022 Friendly Melilla; 61-58 2021 Friendly Córdoba; 61-65 2019 Friendly Wevelgem (BEL); 73-61 2019 Friendly Zaragoza; 67-60 2018 WC 3P Tenerife; 63-72 2018 WC 1R Tenerife; 58-46 2018 Friendly Valencia; 68-52 2017 EB SF Prague (CZE); 87-48 2017 Friendly Kortrijk (BEL); 69-59 2017 Friendly Kortrijk (BEL); 72-53 2007 EB QF Chieti (ITA); 82-67 2007 Friendly Namur (BEL); 83-68 2006 Friendly Vannes (FRA); 99-84 2005 Friendly Namur (BEL); 80-56 2004 Friendly Valencia; 84-55 2004 Friendly Melilla; 91-51 2004 Friendly El Ejido; 77-62 2003 EB 1R Amaliada (GRE); 84-51 1985 EB 1R Treviso (ITA); 90-69 1982 Friendly Edinburgh (SCO); 88-61 1980 EB 1R Prijedor (BIH); 79-81 1978 Friendly Tongres (BEL); 71-65 1978 Friendly Koersel (BEL); 73-51 1976 EB CR Ferrand Clermont (FRA); 72-51 1974 EB-QL A Coruña
Germany	EU	30	25	5	.833	2178	1808	+370	Extended content 81-58 2026 WC 3P Berlin (GER); 83-53 2026 WC 1R Berlin (GER); 65-60 2026 Friendly Ludwigsburg (GER)); 79-60 2025 EB 1R Hamburg (GER); 67-42 2023 EB QF Ljubljana (SLO); 61-55 2013 EB-QL Nordlingen (GER); 66-39 2013 EB-QL Avila; 79-69 2011 EB 1R Katowice (POL); 90-60 2005 Friendly Namur (BEL); 84-59 2003 EB-QL Vigo; 85-57 2003 EB-QL Nordlingen (GER); 71-67 1998 Friendly Logroño; 71-72 1997 EB 1R Zalaegerszeg (HUN); 95-62 1997 EB-QL Oviedo; 82-76 1996 Friendly Toulouse (FRA); 64-50 1995 Friendly Osnabruck (GER); 67-61 1995 Friendly Bremen (GER); 70-63 1995 Friendly Ibbenburen (GER); 83-95 1993 EB-QL Helsinki (FIN); 95-62 1990 Friendly Pozuelo ↑ As Germany; 76-70 1989 EB-QL Naantali (FIN); 92-61 1988 Friendly Gdansk (POL); 67-56 1985 Friendly Cherbourg (FRA); 64-63 1983 EB CR Budapest (HUN); 63-49 1980 EB-QL Vigo; 71-64 1978 EB CR Poznan (POL); 63-66 1978 EB-QL Wolfenbuttel (GER); 41-50 1976 EB CR Ferrand Clermont (FRA); 62-60 1976 EB-QL Alcoy; 41-49 1974 EB CR Sassari (ITA) ↑ As West Germany
Hungary	EU	30	16	14	.533	2092	2122	-30	Extended content 73-72 2024 OL-QL Sopron (HUN); 69-60 2023 EB SF Ljubljana (SLO); 65-77 2023 Friendly Sopron (HUN); 65-63 2023 Friendly Sopron (HUN); 77-66 2023 EB-QL Huelva; 66-62 2023 EB-QL Szekszárd (HUN); 62-48 2017 EB 1R Hradec Králové (CZE); 69-46 2015 EB 1R Sopron (HUN); 71-59 2003 EB 1R Amaliada (GRE); 71-60 2001 EB QF Le Mans (FRA); 70-84 1997 EB QF Budapest (HUN); 82-52 1997 Friendly Logroño; 83-61 1996 Friendly Logroño; 105-108 1995 EB 1R Brno (CZE); 71-64 1994 Friendly Madrid; 63-79 1990 Friendly Pozuelo; 64-62 1991 EB-QL Athens (GRE); 76-85 1990 Friendly Gdansk (POL); 44-59 1989 Friendly Budapest (HUN); 66-50 1989 Friendly Budapest (HUN); 88-79 1989 Friendly Madrid; 60-81 1987 Friendly Gdansk (POL); 65-78 1985 EB 1R Treviso (ITA); 75-94 1985 Friendly Chartres (FRA); 58-84 1984 Friendly Messina (ITA); 101-99 1984 Friendly Messina (ITA); 64-94 1983 EB 1R Miskolc (HUN); 72-79 1978 EB 1R Torun (POL); 60-64 1976 EB CR Ferrand Clermont (FRA); 37-53 1970 EB-QL Girona
Netherlands	EU	26	17	9	.654	1756	1604	+152	Extended content 81-64 2025 EB-QL Almere (NED); 66-59 2025 EB-QL Castellón; 65-48 2019 EB-QL Amsterdam (NED); 92-26 2019 EB-QL Valladolid; 67-41 2013 Friendly Benahavís; 67-65 1991 EB-QL Athens (GRE); 60-67 1989 Friendly Talavera; 74-64 1989 Friendly Gdansk (POL); 74-64 1988 Friendly Gdansk (POL); 55-61 1986 Friendly Ubrique; 73-68 1986 Friendly Pto Santa María; 56-44 1985 EB CR Treviso (ITA); 66-70 1985 Friendly Flers (FRA); 54-51 1984 Friendly Ferrol; 66-62 1984 Friendly Carballo; 52-53 1983 EB 1R Miskolc (HUN); 57-80 1982 Friendly Edinburgh (SCO); 74-69 1982 Friendly Utrech (NED); 76-77 1982 Friendly Lochem (NED); 85-76 1979 Friendly Gramanet; 82-69 1979 Friendly Figueras; 65-71 1978 EB CR Poznan (POL); 73-63 1978 Friendly Doubeyerlan (NED); 66-82 1978 Friendly Wychen (NED); 57-56 1976 EB 1R Vichy (FRA); 53-54 1974 EB CR Sassari (ITA)
Sweden	EU	23	19	4	.826	1889	1521	+368	Extended content 78-75 2025 EB 1R Hamburg; 76-55 2021 EB 1R Valencia; 62-29 2019 Friendly Fuenlabrada; 93-45 2017 EB-QL Logroño; 75-52 2017 EB-QL Sodertajle (SWE); 64-60 2015 EB 1R Sopron (HUN); 73-49 2013 EB 1R Vannes (FRA); 73-79 2013 EB-QL Alcobendas; 69-70 2013 EB-QL Sodertajle (SWE); 80-71 2012 Friendly Kaunas (LTU); 72-64 1994 Friendly Madrid; 95-68 1994 Friendly Pozuelo; 100-87 1994 Friendly Madrid; 111-64 1993 EB-QL Helsinki (FIN); 87-88 1988 Friendly Idrottshuset (SWE); 75-66 1988 Friendly Huskvarna (SWE); 92-76 1987 EB CR Cádiz; 98-77 1987 Friendly Pto Santa Maria; 89-84 1987 Friendly Jerez Frontera; 87-69 1987 Friendly Gdansk (POL); 82-85 1983 EB CR Budapest (HUN); 87-62 1978 EB CR Poznan (POL); 71-46 1974 EB-QL A Coruña
Japan	AS	20	18	2	.900	1687	1347	+340	Extended content 79-59 2026 WC 1R Berlin (GER); 75-86 2024 OL-QL Sopron (HUN); 84-71 2018 WC 1R Tenerife; 94-90 2018 Friendly Tenerife; 84-83 2018 Friendly Palma de Mallorca; 87-81 2018 Friendly Palma de Mallorca; 67-51 2017 Friendly Torrelavega; 74-50 2014 WC 1R Ankara (TUR); 68-55 2014 Friendly Murcia; 74-54 2011 Friendly Ávila; 86-59 2010 WC 2R Brno (CZE); 89-60 2008 Friendly Paterna; 72-59 2004 Friendly El Ejido; 100-63 2002 WC 1R Wunzhong (CHN); 100-77 2001 Friendly Burriana; 87-62 2001 Friendly Burriana; 97-58 1998 WC 2R Bremen (GER); 90-71 1997 Friendly Logroño; 103-59 1995 Friendly Madrid; 77-79 1995 Friendly Madrid
Czech Republic	EU	20	16	4	.800	1412	1243	+169	Extended content 88-81 2025 EB QF Piraeus (GRE); 63-67 2017 EB 1R Hradec Králové (CZE); 67-43 2014 WC 1R Ankara (TUR); 75-58 2013 EB QF Orchies (FRA); 77-57 2010 WC 2R Brno (CZE); 66-59 2009 EB 1R Liepaja (LAT); 74-55 2008 OL 1R Beijing (CHN); 66-63 2008 Friendly Moscow (RUS); 70-51 2008 Friendly Palencia; 75-57 2008 Friendly Segovia; 49-57 2006 WC CR São Paulo (BRA); 66-76 2005 EB SF Ankara (TUR); 68-79 2004 OL CR Athens (GRE); 80-78 2004 OL 1R Athens (GRE); 68-53 2003 Friendly La Línea; 62-60 2001 EB-QL Logroño; 54-47 2001 EB-QL Trutnov (CZE); 82-78 1997 EB 1R Zalaegerszeg (HUN); 81-71 1996 Friendly Logroño; 81-53 1994 Friendly Madrid
Romania	EU	20	11	9	.550	1526	1310	+216	Extended content 75-32 2023 EB-QL Sfântu Gheorghe (ROU); 107-52 2023 EB-QL Almería; 68-54 2013 EB-QL Arganda del Rey; 68-51 2013 EB-QL Bucarest (ROU); 98-53 2005 EB 1R Ismir (TUR); 77-43 2005 Friendly Glyfada (GRE); 71-58 2003 EB-QL Cluj (ROU); 93-46 2003 EB-QL Salamanca; 83-61 2001 EB 1R Orléans (FRA); 97-63 1995 EB 1R Brno (CZE); 69-70 1995 Friendly San Fernando; 87-69 1991 Friendly Pozuelo; 47-73 1986 Friendly Constanza (ROU); 60-76 1986 Friendly Kosice (TCH); 73-93 1985 EB CR Treviso (ITA); 92-111 1985 Friendly Chartres (FRA); 64-83 1983 EB 1R Miskolc (HUN); 63-64 1978 EB CR Poznan (POL); 62-82 1976 EB CR Ferrand Clermont (FRA); 72-76 1974 EB 1R Nuoro (ITA)
Turkey	EU	18	16	2	.889	1187	1000	+187	Extended content 59-47 2024 Friendly Vigo; 76-37 2023 Friendly Córdoba; 58-55 2019 Friendly Burgos; 64-62 2016 OL QF Rio de Janeiro (BRA); 66-71 2016 Friendly Rio de Janeiro (BRA); 73-67 2015 Friendly Santander; 66-56 2014 WC SF Istanbul (TUR); 55-51 2014 Friendly Minsk (BLR); 61-48 2013 EB 2R Lille (FRA); 53-39 2013 Friendly Évry (FRA); 63-53 2013 Friendly Benahavís; 58-55 2011 Friendly Istanbul (TUR); 68-53 2011 Friendly Linares; 71-76 2009 Friendly Istanbul (TUR); 78-64 2005 EB 1R Ismir (TUR); 63-51 2004 Friendly El Ejido; 75-74 2003 Friendly Guadalajara
Lithuania	EU	18	12	6	.667	1371	1257	+114	Extended content 72-58 2015 EB 1R Sopron (HUN); 85-80 2012 Friendly Kaunas (LTU); 77-87 2009 Friendly Kaunas (LTU); 71-80 2006 WC CR São Paulo (BRA); 75-55 2006 WC 2R São Paulo (BRA); 83-65 2005 EB 3P Ankara (TUR); 69-74 2005 EB 1R Ismir (TUR); 89-92 2005 Friendly Rivas; 85-67 2002 Friendly León; 76-35 2002 Friendly Bembibre; 89-74 2001 EB 3P Le Mans (FRA); 81-76 2001 Friendly Puerto de la Cruz; 67-62 2001 Friendly Huesca; 70-59 1998 WC CR Berlin (GER); 63-66 1998 WC 2R Bremen (GER); 67-80 1997 EB 1R Zalaegerszeg (HUN); 75-77 1996 Friendly Logroño; 77-70 1996 Friendly Madrid
Australia	AS	17	9	8	.529	1144	1136	+8	Extended content 89-66 2026 WC QF (Berlin); 66-75 2024 Friendly Segovia; 66-72 2018 WC SF Tenerife; 65-62 2018 Friendly Tenerife ↑ Since 2017, as member of FIBA Asia; 58-55 2016 Friendly San Fernando; 80-51 2015 Friendly Huelva; 64-85 2010 Friendly Salamanca; 87-74 2010 Friendly Hartford (USA); 68-72 2006 WC 2R São Paulo (BRA); 58-65 2004 Friendly Valencia; 58-73 2002 WC 1R Wunzhong (CHN); 59-33 2001 Friendly Villarreal; 63-53 2001 Friendly Castellon; 54-87 1998 WC QF Berlin (GER); 97-83 1990 Friendly Toulouse (FRA); 80-77 1990 Friendly Gdansk (POL); 32-53 1971 Friendly Madrid ↑ As member of FIBA Oceania
Bulgaria	EU	17	8	9	.471	1219	1243	-24	Extended content 97-57 2019 EB-QL; 92-42 2019 EB-QL Sofia (BUL); 79-51 2013 EB-QL Sofia (BUL); 64-48 2013 EB-QL Murcia; 72-57 2001 EB-QL Logroño; 65-59 2001 EB-QL Stara-Zagora (BUL); 81-73 1997 EB-QL Oviedo; 76-70 1993 EB 1R Perugia (ITA); 59-109 1988 Friendly Gdansk (POL); 74-84 1987 EB 1R Pto Santa Maria; 76-91 1987 Friendly Sofia (BUL); 79-85 1986 Friendly Madrid; 68-83 1986 Friendly Huelva; 47-88 1980 EB 1R Prijedor (BIH); 61-90 1978 EB 1R Torun (POL); 62-72 1976 EB 1R Vichy (FRA); 67-84 1974 EB 1R Nuoro (ITA)
Czechoslovakia †	EU	17	5	12	.294	1042	1256	-214	Extended content 59-58 1992 OL CR Barcelona; 59-58 1992 OL 1R Barcelona; 71-62 1992 Friendly Madrid; 69-81 1993 EB-QL Helsinki (FIN); 60-57 1991 Friendly Pozuelo; 78-65 1991 Friendly Madrid; 72-90 1989 Friendly Gdansk (POL); 53-76 1989 EB-QL Naantali (FIN); 72-90 1988 Friendly Gdansk (POL); 47-49 1987 EB 1R Pto Santa Maria; 47-58 1986 Friendly Kosice (TCH); 56-92 1986 Friendly Bardejov (TCH); 81-94 1986 Friendly Orléans (FRA); 68-86 1983 Friendly Jicin (TCH); 51-82 1983 Friendly Podebrady (TCH); 65-89 1980 EB 1R Prijedor (BIH); 34-69 1976 EB 1R Vichy (FRA)
Latvia	EU	16	13	3	.813	1116	944	+172	Extended content 63-67 2023 EB 1R Tel-Aviv (ISR); 59-56 2019 EB 1R Riga (LAT); 77-51 2019 Friendly Burgos; 67-47 2017 EB QF Prague (CZE); 68-63 2012 Friendly Kaunas (LTU); 66-57 2011 EB 2R Katowice (POL); 67-60 2009 EB 2R Riga (LAT); 73-66 2007 Friendly Namur (BEL); 69-62 2007 Friendly Riga (LAT); 69-50 2005 EB QF Ankara (TUR); 82-58 2001 EB-QL Riga (LAT); 79-47 2001 EB-QL Burgos; 69-76 1999 EB-QL Daruvar (CRO); 62-45 1992 Friendly Madrid; 81-73 1992 Friendly Cádiz; 65-66 1992 Friendly Puerto Real
Brazil	AM	15	7	8	.467	1094	1156	-62	Extended content 83-56 2014 WC 1R Ankara (TUR); 69-57 2010 WC 1R Brno (CZE); 68-71 2008 OL-QL Madrid; 67-66 2006 WC 1R São Paulo (BRA); 66-84 2006 Friendly São Paulo (BRA); 63-67 2004 OL QF Athens (GRE); 72-67 2003 Friendly Cáceres; 78-68 2002 WC 2R Suzhou (CHN); 87-92 1994 WC 2R Sydney (AUS); 76-79 1992 Friendly Madrid; 86-75 1992 Friendly Cádiz; 92-88 1992 Friendly Cádiz; 65-82 1988 OL-QL Singapore (SIN); 68-101 1986 Friendly Tortosa; 54-103 1986 Friendly Vicenscastellet
United States	AM	15	0	15	.000	965	1326	-361	Extended content 66-76 2026 WC SF Berlin (GER); 70-84 2026 WC-QL San Juan (PUR); 72-101 2016 OL F Rio de Janeiro (BRA); 63-103 2016 OL 1R Rio de Janeiro (BRA); 64-77 2014 WC F Istanbul (TUR); 70-106 2010 WC SF Karlovy Vary (CZE); 69-85 2010 Friendly Hartford (USA); 55-93 2008 OL 1R Beijing (CHN); 58-71 2004 OL 1R Athens (GRE); 61-77 2004 Friendly Salamanca; 55-94 2002 WC QF Nanjing (CHN); 68-79 1998 WC 2R Bremen (GER); 64-74 1998 Friendly Fuenlabrada; 71-92 1994 WC 1R Hobart (AUS); 59-114 1992 OL 1R Barcelona
Greece	EU	14	14	0	1.000	1079	761	+318	Extended content 64-40 2025 Friendly Inca; 76-60 2023 EB 1R Tel-Aviv (ISR); 82-56 2018 Friendly Cáceres; 79-39 2015 Friendly Santander; 71-57 2011 Friendly Istanbul (TUR); 80-39 2010 Friendly Lugo; 67-48 2009 EB 2R Riga (LAT); 63-58 2005 Friendly Glyfada (GRE); 68-53 1999 EB-QL Daruvar (CRO); 92-62 1992 Friendly Cuenca; 76-64 1992 Friendly Madrid; 104-55 1991 Friendly Pozuelo; 82-69 1991 MG MR Thessaloniki (GRE); 75-61 1991 EB-QL Athens (GRE)
Ukraine	EU	13	12	1	.923	1036	853	+183	Extended content 95-77 2019 EB 1R Riga (LAT); 84-71 2019 EB-QL Melilla; 72-68 2019 EB-QL Kyiv (UKR); 76-54 2017 EB 1R Hradec Králové (CZE); 85-59 2009 EB 1R Liepaja (LAT); 76-71 2003 EB 1R Amaliada (GRE); 80-57 2003 Friendly Cáceres; 83-60 2003 Friendly La Línea; 93-65 2001 EB 1R Orléans (FRA); 76-62 1997 EB 1R Zalaegerszeg (HUN); 54-73 1995 EB 1R Brno (CZE); 94-76 1992 Friendly Madrid; 68-60 1992 Friendly Madrid
Finland	EU	11	9	2	.818	881	665	+216	Extended content 72-54 2017 EB-QL Helsinki (FIN); 86-45 2017 EB-QL Zamora; 58-38 2013 Friendly Molina de Segura; 92-28 2013 Friendly Águilas; 83-44 2001 Friendly Puerto de la Cruz; 94-79 1993 EB-QL Helsinki (FIN); 82-78 1989 EB-QL Naantali (FIN); 74-75 1987 EB 1R Pto Santa Maria; 57-59 1986 Friendly Constanza (ROU); 99-94 1983 EB-QL Treviso (ITA); 84-71 1980 EB CR Banjaluka (BIH)
Croatia	EU	11	8	3	.727	822	699	+123	Extended content 78-62 2025 EB-QL Castellón; 70-65 2025 EB-QL Split (CRO); 95-52 2015 EB 2R Győr (HUN); 76-55 2013 Friendly Benahavís; 71-75 2011 EB 2R Katowice (POL); 80-63 2011 Friendly Linares; 63-52 2007 EB 1R Ortona (ITA); 75-55 2003 Friendly La Línea; 73-64 1999 EB-QL Daruvar (CRO); 71-83 1997 EB-QL Oviedo; 70-73 1995 EB 1R Brno (CZE)
Serbia	EU	10	9	1	.900	760	673	+87	Extended content 70-62 2024 OL 1R Lille (FRA); 85-70 2020 OL 1R Saitama (JPN)); 64-71 2021 EB QF Valencia; 71-66 2019 EB SF Belgrade (SRB); 68-54 2016 OL SF Rio de Janeiro (BRA); 65-59 2016 OL 1R Rio de Janeiro (BRA); 91-80 2015 EB 2R Győr (HUN); 79-66 2014 Friendly Murcia; 88-69 2013 EB SF Orchies (FRA); 79-76 2007 EB 1R Ortona (ITA)
Serbia and Montenegro †	EU	10	8	2	.800	767	634	+133	Extended content 69-52 2005 EB 1R Ismir (TUR); 101-53 2005 Friendly Rivas; 76-64 2003 EB QF Patras (GRE); 60-57 2003 Friendly Guadalajara; 57-64 2003 Friendly Cáceres ↑ As Serbia and Montenegro 2003-2006; 81-67 2002 WC 2R Suzhou (CHN); 87-79 2002 Friendly Pontevedra; 79-80 2001 EB 1R Orléans (FRA); 71-47 1997 EB CR Budapest (HUN); 86-71 1997 EB 1R Zalaegerszeg (HUN) ↑ As FR Yugoslavia 1995-2002
Belarus	EU	10	8	2	.800	676	608	+68	Extended content 51-53 2021 EB 1R Valencia; 74-58 2015 EB 3P Budapest (HUN); 82-81 2014 Friendly Minsk (BLR); 57-52 2011 Friendly Linares; 77-68 2010 WC 3P Karlovy Vary (CZE); 68-65 2010 Friendly Lugo; 63-56 2009 EB 3P Riga (LAT); 58-59 2009 Friendly Istanbul (TUR); 70-54 2007 EB SF Chieti (ITA); 76-62 2007 EB 1R Ortona (ITA)
Yugoslavia †	EU	10	1	9	.100	631	785	-154	Extended content 74-98 1989 Friendly Pescara (ITA); 58-60 1987 EB 1R Pto Santa Maria; 62-90 1987 Friendly Sofia (BUL); 57-75 1983 EB 1R Miskolc (HUN); 52-60 1983 Friendly Pozega (CRO); 56-75 1977 Friendly Barcelona; 81-72 1977 Friendly Hospitalet; 63-71 1977 Friendly Gramanet; 71-80 1974 EB CR Sassari (ITA); 57-104 1974 EB-QL A Coruña
South Korea	AS	9	8	1	.889	680	571	+109	Extended content 73-69 2020 OL 1R Saitama (JPN)); 83-46 2020 OL-QL Belgrade (SRB); 70-50 2016 OL-QL Nantes (FRA); 84-69 2010 WC 1R Brno (CZE); 87-57 2006 WC 1R São Paulo (BRA); 64-61 2004 OL 1R Athens (GRE); 72-79 1996 Friendly Toulouse (FRA); 89-88 1994 WC 1R Hobart (AUS); 58-52 1986 Friendly Constanza (ROU)
England †	EU	7	7	0	1.000	617	409	+208	Extended content 104-48 1989 EB-QL Naantali (FIN); 76-43 1980 EB CR Banjaluka (BIH); 103-66 1980 EB-QL Vigo; 83-63 1980 Friendly Carballo; 91-81 1980 Friendly Mostoles; 76-63 1978 EB-QL Wolfenbuttel (GER); 84-45 1974 EB-QL A Coruña
Argentina	AM	7	6	1	.857	550	363	+187	Extended content 66-33 2018 Friendly Cáceres; 73-47 2016 Friendly San Fernando; 92-43 2008 Friendly Alcobendas; 64-77 2006 WC 1R São Paulo (BRA); 97-55 2002 WC 1R Wunzhong (CHN); 94-63 2002 Friendly Pontevedra; 64-45 1998 WC 1R Rotenburg (GER)
Mali	AF	7	6	1	.857	582	358	+224	Extended content 73-82 2026 WC 1R Berlin (GER); 97-58 2026 Friendly Zaragoza; 80-36 2010 WC 1R Brno (CZE); 99-36 2010 Friendly Alcobendas; 88-44 2010 Friendly Alcobendas; 79-47 2008 OL 1R Beijing (CHN); 66-55 2008 Friendly San Fernando
New Zealand	AS	7	6	1	.857	601	395	+206	Extended content 99-50 2026 WC-QL San Juan (PUR) ↑ Since 2017, as member of FIBA Asia; 80-60 2016 Friendly Oviedo; 52-54 2016 Friendly Gijón; 85-62 2008 OL 1R Beijing (CHN); 77-58 2008 Friendly Paterna; 91-57 2004 OL 1R Athens (GRE); 117-54 1994 WC 1R Hobart (AUS) ↑ As member of FIBA Oceania
Slovakia	EU	7	6	1	.857	536	414	+122	Extended content 93-61 2021 EB 1R Valencia; 82-81 2015 EB 1R Sopron (HUN); 80-44 2013 EB 2R Lille (FRA); 71-54 2009 EB 1R Liepaja (LAT); 71-47 2003 EB 1R Amaliada (GRE); 66-72 1995 EB 1R Brno (CZE); 73-55 1993 EB SF Perugia (ITA)
Israel	EU	7	5	2	.714	529	456	+73	Extended content 58-69 2008 Friendly Moscow (RUS); 79-54 2003 EB-QL Tel Aviv (ISR); 83-47 2003 EB-QL Madrid; 83-52 1997 EB-QL Oviedo; 86-69 1993 EB-QL Helsinki (FIN); 57-86 1991 EB-QL Athens (GRE); 83-79 1980 EB-QL Vigo
Senegal	AF	6	6	0	1.000	499	282	+217	Extended content 84-51 2026 WC-QL San Juan (PUR); 97-43 2018 WC CR Tenerife; 97-43 2016 OL 1R Rio de Janeiro (BRA); 77-46 2010 Friendly Salamanca; 74-46 2006 Friendly Vannes (FRA); 104-48 2002 Friendly León
Montenegro	EU	6	5	1	.833	430	361	+69	Extended content 78-57 2023 EB 1R Tel-Aviv (ISR); 76-55 2021 EB CR Valencia; 75-74 2015 EB QF Budapest (HUN); 66-50 2013 EB 2R Lille (FRA); 57-66 2011 EB 1R Katowice (POL); 76-63 2011 Friendly Istanbul (TUR)
Switzerland	EU	6	5	1	.833	385	284	+101	Extended content 94-64 2025 Friendly Viana (POR); 94-61 1983 EB-QL Treviso (ITA); 61-44 1970 EB-QL Girona; 58-36 1970 Friendly Badalona; 47-39 1963 Friendly Barcelona; 31-40 1963 Friendly Malgrat de Mar
Soviet Union †	EU	6	0	6	.000	341	653	-312	Extended content 65-108 1989 Friendly Orléans (FRA); 62-119 1988 OL-QL Singapore (SIN); 54-95 1987 Friendly Sofia (BUL); 57-107 1987 Friendly Ferrol; 42-115 1985 EB 1R Treviso (ITA); 61-109 1985 Friendly Messina (ITA)
Great Britain	EU	5	5	0	1.000	378	304	+74	Extended content 85-70 2025 EB 1R Hamburg (GER); 79-69 2020 OL-QL Belgrade (SRB); 67-59 2019 EB 1R Riga (LAT); 67-65 2019 Friendly Fuenlabrada; 70-41 2015 Friendly Logroño
Portugal	EU	4	4	0	1.000	301	210	+91	Extended content 68-59 2025 Friendly Viana (POR); 79-60 2000 Friendly Torrelavega; 72-55 1974 Friendly Lisboa (POR); 82-36 1974 Friendly Cáceres
Angola	AF	3	3	0	1.000	250	136	+114	Extended content 94-63 2014 Friendly Murcia; 71-39 2008 Friendly Palencia; 89-57 1988 OL-QL Singapore (SIN)
Moldova	EU	3	3	0	1.000	262	168	+94	Extended content 66-47 1999 EB-QL Daruvar (CRO); 95-62 1997 EB-QL Oviedo; 101-59 1995 EB 1R Brno (CZE)
Puerto Rico	AM	3	3	0	1.000	232	167	+65	Extended content 91-52 2026 WC-QL San Juan (PUR); 63-62 2024 OL 1R Lille (FRA); 78-53 2018 WC 1R Tenerife
Scotland †	EU	3	3	0	1.000	292	142	+150	Extended content 87-48 1982 Friendly Edinburgh (SCO); 110-58 1978 EB-QL Wolfenbuttel (GER); 95-36 1976 EB-QL Alcoy
Denmark	EU	3	2	1	.667	211	162	+49	Extended content 45-62 1991 EB-QL Athens (GRE); 95-51 1976 EB-QL Alcoy; 71-49 1974 EB CR Sassari (ITA)
Slovenia	EU	3	2	1	.667	196	206	-10	Extended content 60-56 2022 Friendly Cividale del Friuli (ITA); 69-90 1994 WC CR Sydney (AUS); 67-60 1993 MG MR Lattes (FRA)
Austria	EU	2	2	0	1.000	151	79	+72	Extended content 76-45 2025 EB-QL Vienna (AUT); 75-34 2025 EB-QL Tenerife
Iceland	EU	2	2	0	1.000	208	88	+120	Extended content 88-34 2023 EB-QL Reykjavík; 120-54 2023 EB-QL Huelva
Ireland	EU	2	2	0	1.000	158	108	+50	Extended content 85-59 1983 EB-QL Treviso (ITA); 73-49 1978 EB-QL Wolfenbuttel (GER)
Nigeria	AF	2	2	0	1.000	144	110	+34	Extended content 83-58 2026 Friendly Santa Cruz de Tenerife; 61-52 2021 Friendly Córdoba
Venezuela	AM	2	2	0	1.000	186	100	+86	Extended content 83-55 2016 OL-QL Nantes (FRA); 103-45 2015 Friendly Huelva
Bosnia and Herzegovina	EU	2	1	1	.500	155	131	+24	Extended content 85-58 1997 Friendly Logroño; 70-73 1993 MG MR Lattes (FRA)
Albania	EU	1	1	0	1.000	94	76	+18	Extended content 94-76 1991 MG MR Thessaloniki (GRE)
Chinese Taipei	AS	1	1	0	1.000	80	72	+8	Extended content 80-72 1988 OL-QL Singapore (SIN)
Fiji	OC	1	1	0	1.000	113	42	+71	Extended content 113-42 2008 OL-QL Madrid

== See also ==
- Spain women's national basketball team
- Spain women's national basketball team results
- Medal winners in Spain women's national basketball team
- Spain national basketball team
- Spanish Basketball Federation
- Spain national youth basketball teams
- Basketball at the Summer Olympics
- FIBA Women's Basketball World Cup
- EuroBasket Women
