= Spanish Basketball Hall of Fame =

- Established: 2019
- Location: Sevilla, Spain
- Type: Hall of Fame

The Spanish Basketball Hall of Fame (Spanish: Hall of Fame del Baloncesto Español) is a hall of fame that honours individuals (or whole teams) that has contributed to the spread and improvement of Spanish basketball, through their sporting contributions, their behaviour and their actions in support of the game in Italy.

The Spanish Basketball Federation has presented a class of inductees every year since 2019 (counting for the previous year) with an official ceremony that crowns athletes (male and female), coaches, referees or other figureheads who have contributed to Spanish basketball.

== History ==
The HoF was created in 2019 by the Spanish Basketball Federation, in collaboration with the newspaper AS. The objective aimed to pay recognition, individually or collectively, to the most outstanding protagonists in the history of Spanish basketball.

The first gala was held on October 21, 2021, at the Cartuja stadium in the city of Seville, and the members of the 2019 class were announced: eight players, three coaches, a referee, a club, a manager, two journalists, a team and a city. In 2023, players who never played in the Spanish basketball were also inducted: Predrag Danilovic and Dirk Nowitzki.

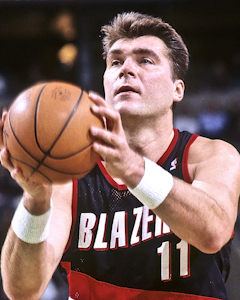
Arvydas Sabonis was inducted in 2019.

== Members ==
The individuals incucted to the Hall of Fame include players, coaches, referees, clubs and other contributors.

*	Member of the Naismith Memorial Basketball Hall of Fame
**	Member of the FIBA Hall of Fame
***	Member of both the Naismith and FIBA Halls of Fame

Class	Inductee	Category	Ref.
2019	(Spain) Juan Carlos Navarro	Player	
2019	(Spain) Amaya Valdemoro	Player (female)	
2019	(Spain) Juan Antonio San Epifanio "Epi"	Player	
2019	(Spain) Juan Antonio Corbalán	Player	
2019	(Spain) Emiliano Rodríguez	Player	
2019	(Spain) Fernando Martín	Player posthumously	
2019	(Spain) Maribel Lorenzo	Player (female) posthumously	
2019	(Lithuania) Arvydas Sabonis	Player (international)	
2019	(Spain) María Planas	Coach (female)	
2019	(Spain) Pedro Ferrándiz	Coach	
2019	(Spain) Antonio Díaz Miguel	Coach posthumously	
2019	(Spain) Miguel Ángel Betancor	Referee	
2019	(Spain) Club Esportiu Laietà	Contributor	
2019	(Spain) Ramón Trecet	Contributor	
2019	(Spain) Anselmo López	Contributo rposthumously	
2019	(Spain) Andrés Montes	Contributor posthumously	
2019	(Spain) Alcobendas	Contributor (extraordinary)	
2019	Spain women's national basketball team 1993	Team	
2022	(United States) (Spain) Clifford Luyk	Player	
2022	(Spain) Nino Buscató	Player	
2022	(Spain) José Manuel Calderón	Player	
2022	(Spain) Blanca Ares	Player (female)	
2022	(Spain) Elisa Aguilar	Player (female)	
2022	(Brazil) Oscar Schmidt	Player (internaTional)	
2022	(Spain) Uliana Semiónova	Player (female) (extraordinary)	
2022	(Spain) Lolo Sainz	Coach	
2022	(Spain) Aíto García Reneses	Coach	
2022	(Spain) Javier Imbroda	Coach posthumously	
2022	(Spain) Francisco Monjas	Referee	
2022	(Spain) Jorge Guillén	Contributor	
2022	(Spain) Pedro Barthe	Contributor	
2022	(Spain) Ernesto Segura de Luna	Contributor posthumously	
2022	(Spain) Raimundo Saporta	Contributor posthumously	
2022	(Spain) Pilar Godia	Contributor posthumously	
2022	(Spain) Héctor Quiroga	Contributor in memoriam	
2022	(Spain) Junta de Andalucía	Contributor (extraordinary)	
2022	Spain men's national basketball team 1984	Team	
2023	(Spain) Pau Gasol	Player	
2023	(Spain) Laia Palau	Player (female)	
2023	(Spain) Felipe Reyes	Player	
2023	(Spain) Margarita "Wony" Geuer	Player (female)	
2023	(Spain) Fernando Romay	Player	
2023	(Spain) Pilar Valero	Player (female) posthumously	
2023	(Argentina) Luis Scola	Player (internaTional)	
2023	(Socialist Federal Republic of Yugoslavia) Predrag Danilović	Player (international)	
2023	(Spain) Natalia Zassouskaya	Player (female) (international)	
2023	(Germany) Dirk Nowitzki	Player (international)	
2023	(Spain) José Vicente "Pepu" Hernández	Coach	
2023	(Socialist Federal Republic of Yugoslavia) Božidar Maljković	Coach	
2023	(Spain) Vicente Sanchís	Referee	
2023	(Spain) Ángel Sancha	Referee posthumously	
2023	(Spain) Liga ACB	Contributor	
2023	(Spain) Revista Gigantes del Basket	Contributor	
2024	(Spain) Marc Gasol	Player	
2024	(Spain) Jorge Garbajosa	Player	
2024	(United States) (Spain) Wayne Brabender	Player	
2024	(Spain) Elisabeth Cebrián	Player (female)	
2024	(Spain) Marina Ferragut	Player (female)	
2024	(Croatia) Dražen Petrović	Player posthumously	
2024	(United States) Audie Norris	Player (international)	
2024	(Spain) Moncho Monsalve	Coach	
2024	(Spain) Pilar Landeira	Referee	
2024	(Spain) Antoni Daimiel	Contributor	
2024	Spain men's national basketball team U-19 - 2023	Team (extraordinary)	
2025	(Spain) Rudy Fernández	Player	
2025	(Spain) Jordi Villacampa	Player	
2025	(Spain) Lucila Pascua	Player (female)	
2025	(Spain) Ana Belén Álvaro	Jugadora	
2025	(Socialist Federal Republic of Yugoslavia) Svetislav Pešić	Coach	
2025	(United States) Joe Arlauckas	Player (international)	
2025	(Spain) Santiago Fernández	Referee	
2025	(Spain) Club Joventut Badalona	Club	
2025	(Spain) CB Estudiantes	Club	

== See also ==
- College Basketball Hall of Fame
- Basketball Hall of Fame
  - List of members of the Naismith Memorial Basketball Hall of Fame
  - List of players in the Naismith Memorial Basketball Hall of Fame
  - List of coaches in the Naismith Memorial Basketball Hall of Fame
- FIBA Hall of Fame
  - List of members of the FIBA Hall of Fame
- EuroLeague Hall of Fame
- Greek Basket League Hall of Fame
- French Basketball Hall of Fame
- VTB United League Hall of Fame
- Finnish Basketball Hall of Fame
- Australian Basketball Hall of Fame
- Philippine Basketball Association Hall of Fame
- Women's Basketball Hall of Fame
