= BEX Banco Exterior =

Toledo'92 - BEX
- Leagues: Liga Femenina
- Founded: 1988
- Folded: 1992
- Location: Toledo, Spain
- Head coach: Chema Buceta

BEX Banco Exterior or Toledo'92 was a Spanish women's basketball team from Toledo and Madrid. It competed 4 seasons in the Spanish top-tier league from 1988 to 1992.

In October 1986 Barcelona was selected to host the 1992 Summer Olympics, meaning the automatic qualification of the Spain women's national basketball team. The team had never qualified for the Olympic tournament or the Women's World Cup and had only played seven EuroBasket final tournaments, with a record of 17 wins and 32 losses (34.6% winning ratio).

The Spanish Basketball Federation reached an agreement with the teams of the Spanish league and sent the best young prospects to club Caja Toledo to compete in the 1988–89 Liga Femenina as a regular team, but without taking their results into account in the final standings. For sponsorship reasons, the team was called ADO'92 or Toledo'92.

For the following three seasons, the team played in Madrid, changing the name to BEX Banco Exterior in the next two seasons and Banco Exterior Argentaria in their final season. Although Caixa Tarragona won the 1988-89 league, they renounced to play the 1989–90 FIBA Women's European Champions Cup, and BEX, having finished second in the regular season, took their slot, winning the four games of the qualifying round and finishing fifth in the group stage, with a balance of 4–6. This same season they finished top of the 1989–90 Liga Femenina regular season, with a record of 25–3. After their fourth season and the upcoming Olympics, the team was disbanded as such, and ended their relationship with the Spanish Federation. The Banco Exterior Argentaria team competed for two more seasons in the Spanish league before being disbanded.

Coached by Chema Buceta, the main goal of the team was the preparation of the Olympic Games, and played over 80 friendly matches against clubs and national teams. With training sessions in the morning and in the afternoon, the players had to pay attention to their academic subjects too, and soon their level required them to travel abroad to compete against better teams: Cuba, Canada, USA, Australia, Brazil.

The final roster for the Olympic games was composed of: Patricia Hernández, Carolina Mújica, Blanca Ares, Piluca Alonso, Mónica Pulgar, Margarita Geuer, Almudena Vara, Ana Belén Alvaro, Mónica Messa, Marina Ferragut, Betty Cebrián and Carlota Castrejana, finishing 5th, with 3 wins and 2 losses. Eight of these twelve players would continue in the team to become European champions the following summer with coach Manolo Coloma.
