= Mónica Messa =

Spanish basketball player

Personal information
- Born: Mónica Messa López; 7 October 1966 (age 59) Madrid, Spain
- Listed height: 179 cm (5 ft 10 in)

Career information
- Playing career: 1983–1995
- Position: Shooting guard

Career history
- 1983-1988: Real Canoe
- 1988-1989: Caja Toledo
- 1989-1993: BEX Banco Exterior
- 1993-1995: Real Canoe

Career highlights
- 3x Liga Femenina champion (1984, 1985, 1986); Copa de la Reina champion (1993)
Medals
Women's basketball
Representing Spain
EuroBasket
Gold medal – first place	1993 Italy	Team

Mónica Messa López (Note: In this Spanish name, the first or paternal surname is Messa and the second or maternal family name is López.) (born 7 October 1966) is a former Spanish basketball player, captain of the Spanish team at the 1992 Summer Olympics. She won the gold medal at the 1993 European Championship.

== Early life ==
López was born and raised in Madrid.

== Club career ==
López started playing basketball with school club Colegio Alameda de Osuna. In her junior years she played at Real Canoe NC before her debut in the Liga Femenina de Baloncesto, where she won 3 consecutive titles from 1984 to 1986.

López got transferred to the Caja Toledo - BEX Banco Exterior project, with other young Spanish players in order to prepare for the 1992 Summer Olympics.

== National team ==
She made her debut with Spain women's national basketball team at the age of 19. She played with the senior team for 10 years, from 1985 to 1995, with a total of 185 caps and 4.3 PPG. She participated in the 1992 Barcelona Olympics, and four European Championships:

- 7th 1982 FIBA Europe Under-16 Championship for Women (youth)
- 8th 1983 FIBA Europe Under-18 Championship for Women (youth)
- 4th 1984 FIBA Europe Under-18 Championship for Women (youth)
- 7th 1985 FIBA Under-19 World Championship for Women (youth)
- 10th 1985 Eurobasket
- 6th 1987 Eurobasket
- 5th 1992 Summer Olympics
- 1993 Eurobasket
- 9th 1995 Eurobasket
