= Patricia Hernández =

Patricia Hernández may refer to:

- Patricia Hernández (basketball) (born 1970), Spanish basketball player
- Patricia Hernández (politician) (born 1980), Spanish politician
- Patricia Hernandez, former editor of Kotaku
