= Natalia Rodríguez Núñez-Milara =

Spanish telecommunications engineer and entrepreneur

Natalia Rodríguez Núñez-Milara (Madrid, 1990) is a Spanish telecommunications engineer and entrepreneur specialising in artificial intelligence (AI). She is the founder and executive director of Saturno Labs, a technological innovation laboratory focused on developing solutions with social impact. In 2023, she was awarded the National Innovation Prize in the “Young Innovative Talent” category, becoming the first woman to receive this distinction.

== Biography ==
Rodríguez graduated with a degree in telecommunications engineering from the Higher Technical School of Telecommunications Engineering at the Technical University of Madrid (ETSIT-UPM), where she became interested in technology as a result of personal experiences related to connectivity and her curiosity to understand how devices and networks work. She specialised in artificial intelligence by completing a double master's degree in signal processing, machine learning (ML) and big data.

She combined her university studies with a career as a basketball player, becoming a member of the Spain women's national basketball team. However, she gave up professional sport to focus on engineering and research, participating in projects on smart cities. In 2014, she developed an application designed to connect women who went running alone, linked to the Mujeres que Corren (Women Who Run) initiative. She then lived in Beijing for over a year, where she trained in software development and furthered her education in entrepreneurship and technology strategy.

In 2019, she founded Saturno Labs, a company that applies emerging technologies, especially artificial intelligence, to the development of products aimed at social well-being in fields such as medicine, psychology, and social services. The company has created more than 20 technological solutions, including tools for monitoring hospitalised patients, mobile applications, educational platforms, chatbots, and machine learning-based systems for data analysis. Saturno Labs was the first Spanish company selected to participate in Amazon's Alexa Prize, an international competition in conversational artificial intelligence.

Rodríguez is also a university professor and vice-president of the Unoentrecienmil Foundation, dedicated to research into childhood leukaemia.

== Awards ==
In 2021, Natalia Rodríguez Núñez-Milara was included by Forbes magazine in its list of The 21 Protagonists of Change, a selection of people who stand out for driving significant transformations in different sectors. That same year, she was also included in the Top 100 Women Leaders in Spain by Emprendedores magazine, which highlights female leadership in different professional and social fields.

In 2023, the Ministry of Science and Innovation awarded her the National Innovation Prize in the “Young Innovative Talent” category, which recognises multidisciplinarity and creativity in the development of entrepreneurial projects and innovative business growth, making her the first woman to receive this distinction. The following year, as part of the Mobile World Congress 2024 celebrations, Forbes magazine included her in its list of the 35 leading Spanish women in technology.

Also in 2024, she received the 2024 Artificial Intelligence and Big Data Award from the Spanish Association of Telecommunications Engineers (AEIT-Madrid) for her contribution to bringing telecommunications engineering closer to society.
