= Pilar Valero =

Spanish basketball player (1970–2022)

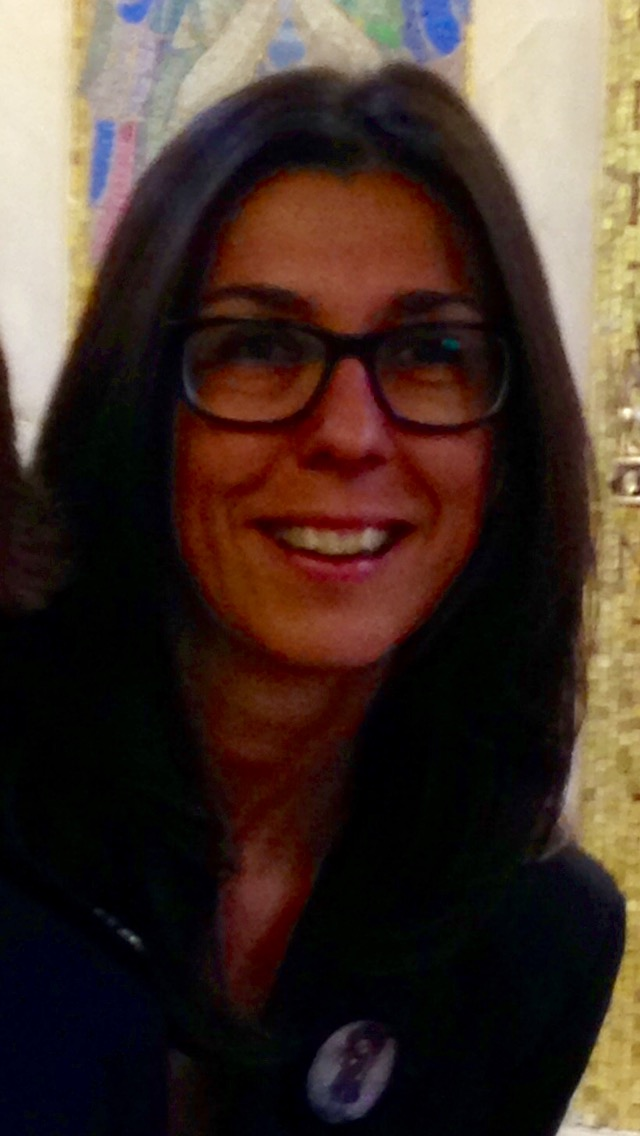
- Valero in 2014

Personal information
- Born: 27 May 1970 Zaragoza, Spain
- Died: 7 November 2022 (aged 52) Zaragoza, Spain
- Listed height: 5 ft 7 in (1.70 m)

Career information
- Playing career: 1988–2014
- Position: Shooting guard

Career history
- 1988–1992: CB Zaragoza
- 1992–1996: Ros Casares Godella
- 1997: Pool Getafe
- 1997–2002: Celta de Vigo Baloncesto
- 2002–2003: CB Ciudad de Burgos
- 2003–2005: Stadium Casablanca
- 2005–2007: CB Islas Canarias
- 2007–2011: Celta de Vigo Baloncesto
- 2011–2014: Stadium Casablanca

María Pilar Valero Cebrián (27 May 1970 – 7 November 2022) was a Spanish basketball player who played as a shooting guard.

== Biography ==
Valero played on the youth team of CB Zaragoza until 1988 and subsequently joined the senior team, with whom she won the Copa de la Reina de Baloncesto in 1990. In 1992, she joined Ros Casares Godella, with whom she won the Liga Femenina de Baloncesto in 1993, 1994, 1995, and 1996, the Copa de la Reina in 1994 and 1995, and the 1992–93 FIBA Women's European Champions Cup. In 1997, she played for Pool Getafe before joining Celta de Vigo Baloncesto, staying there from 1997 to 2002.

Valero played for CB Ciudad de Burgos from 2002 to 2003, Stadium Casablanca from 2003 to 2005, and CB Islas Canarias from 2005 to 2007. In 2007, she rejoined Celta de Vigo Baloncesto and rejoined Stadium Casablanca in 2011, where she stayed until her retirement in 2014.

Valero played in over 100 games for the Spain women's national basketball team, notably participating in the 1994 FIBA World Championship for Women, the 1998 FIBA World Championship for Women, EuroBasket Women 1993, EuroBasket Women 1995, and EuroBasket Women 1997.

Valero died in Zaragoza on 7 November 2022, at the age of 52.
