= Paoline Ekambi =

French former basketball player

Medal record

Representing France

EuroBasket Women
Silver medal – second place	1993 Italy	Team

Mediterranean Games
Silver medal – second place	Athens 1991	Team

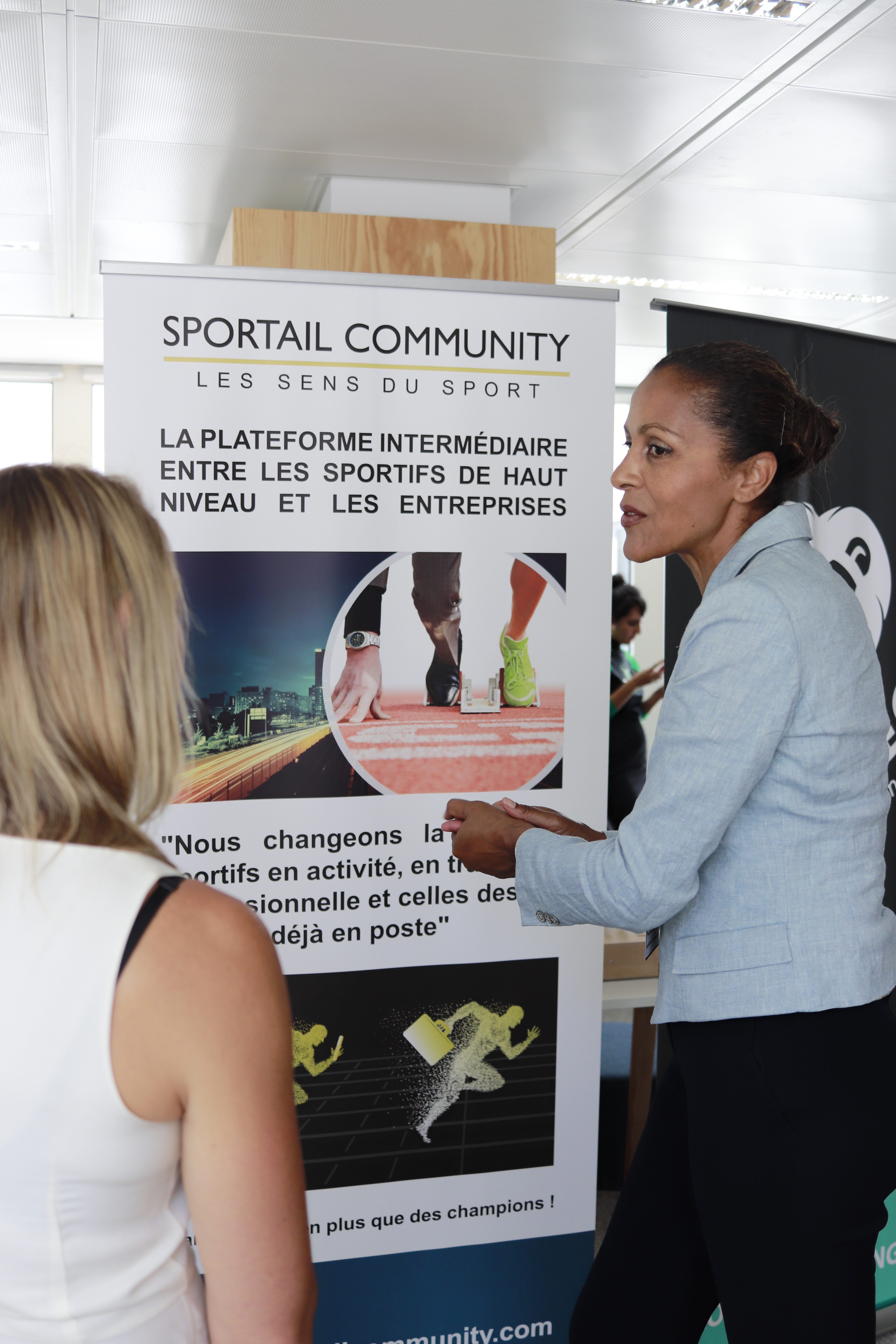
This photo was taken during a "Women Innovation World Cup" 2019 event in the emlyon business school premises.

Paôliné Ekambi Kingue (born 14 May 1962 in Paris, France) is a French former basketball player. She was inducted into the French Basketball Hall of Fame, in 2012.

== National team career ==
Ekambi played in 254 games with the senior French national women's basketball team, from 1980 to 1993.

== Honors and awards ==
- Knight of the Order of Legion of Honour
- Knight of the Ordre National du Mérite
