= Carolina Mújica =

Spanish basketball player

Personal information
- Born: September 14, 1964 (age 62) Madrid
- Listed height: 179 cm (5 ft 10 in)

Career information
- Playing career: 1983–1995
- Position: Small forward

Career history
- 1983-1988: Real Canoe
- 1988-1989: Caja Toledo
- 1989-1994: BEX Banco Exterior
- 1994-1995: Real Canoe

Career highlights
- 3x Liga Femenina champion (1984, 1985, 1986); Copa de la Reina champion (1993)

Carolina Mújica Vallejo (born September 14, 1964) is a former Spanish basketball player, captain of the Spanish team which won the gold medal at the 1993 European Championship.

== Club career ==
Born and raised in Madrid, she played at Real Canoe NC from her junior years to her debut in the Liga Femenina de Baloncesto, where she won 3 consecutive titles from 1984 to 1986.

As one of the most promising young players of her time, she got transferred to the Caja Toledo - BEX Banco Exterior project, with other young Spanish prospects in order to prepare for the 1992 Summer Olympics. She played one last year at Real Canoe, where she retired at the end of the 1994–95 season.

== National team ==
She made her debut with Spain women's national basketball team at the age of 20. She played with the senior team for 11 years, from 1984 to 1995, with a total of 202 caps and 6.3 PPG. She participated in the 1992 Barcelona Olympics, one World Championship and three European Championships:

- 10th 1980 FIBA Europe Under-16 Championship for Women (youth)
- 8th 1983 FIBA Europe Under-18 Championship for Women (youth)
- 6th 1987 Eurobasket
- 5th 1992 Summer Olympics
- 1993 Eurobasket
- 8th 1994 World Championship
- 9th 1995 Eurobasket
