= María Pilar Alonso =

Spanish basketball player (born 1968)

Piluca Alonso
Personal information
- Born: October 8, 1968 (age 58) León, Spain
- Listed height: 195 cm (6 ft 5 in)

Career information
- Playing career: 1983–1998
- Position: Center

Career history
- 1983-1988 (youth/LF): Celta Citroën Vigo
- 1988-1989: Amanecer Alcorcón
- 1989-1991: Dorna Godella
- 1991-1992: Cajalón Zaragoza
- 1992-1993: Dorna Godella
- 1993-1995: Celta de Vigo Baloncesto
- 1995-1996: Costa Naranja
- 1997-1999: Popular Basquet Godella

Career highlights
- FIBA European Champions Cup champion (1993); 3x Liga Femenina champion (1991, 1993, 1996); 2x Copa de la Reina champion (1984, 1991)

María Pilar Alonso López, known as Piluca Alonso (born October 8, 1968) is a former Spanish basketball player, member of the Spanish team at the 1992 Summer Olympics. She won the gold medal at the 1993 European Championship.

== Club career ==
Born and raised in León, she started playing basketball with school club Dominicos, and later in nearby Casa Galicia Baloncesto. She transferred to one of the top teams of the time, the Celta Citroën in 1983. At 1.95m, she was the tallest player in the Liga Femenina de Baloncesto. Being only 16, she won her first title, the 1984 Copa de la Reina. She played at Celta Citroën until the team disappeared for financial reasons. After one season at Amanecer Alcorcón, she signed for Dorna Godella / Costa Naranja, where she won FIBA European Champions Cup 1993.

== National team ==
She made her debut with Spain women's national basketball team at the age of 19. She played with the senior team for 11 years, from 1987 to 1998, with a total of 171 caps and 5.3 PPG. As one of the most promising young players of her time, she was offered the chance to join the Caja Toledo - BEX Banco Exterior project in 1988, with other young Spanish prospects in order to prepare for the 1992 Summer Olympics, but she refused for personal reasons. She was later called up for the Olympic squad due to Yolanda Moliné's injury, but head coach Chema Buceta didn't give her the chance to play because of her denial to join the team in 1988.

She participated in the 1992 Barcelona Olympics, two World Championships and four European Championships:

- 7th 1985 FIBA Under-19 World Championship for Women (youth)
- 6th 1987 Eurobasket
- 5th 1992 Summer Olympics
- 1993 Eurobasket
- 8th 1994 World Championship
- 9th 1995 Eurobasket
- 5th 1997 Eurobasket
- 5th 1998 World Championship
