= Stéphanie Vivenot =

French basketball player

Medal record

Representing France

European Championships
Silver medal – second place	1993 Italy	Team
Silver medal – second place	1999 Poland	Team

Stéphanie Vivenot (born 26 March 1970) is a French former basketball player who competed in the 2000 Summer Olympics in Sydney.

She competed in the United States for the University of Toledo, setting records for blocked shots.
