= Laëtitia Moussard =

French basketball player

Medal record

Representing France

European Championships
Gold medal – first place	2001 France	Team
Silver medal – second place	1993 Italy	Team
Silver medal – second place	1999 Poland	Team

Laetitia Moussard (born 2 July 1971) is a French former basketball player who competed in the 2000 Summer Olympics. She was born in Toulouse. She was inducted into the French Basketball Hall of Fame in 2017.
