= Samantha Gori =

Italian basketball player (born 1968)

Samantha Gori (born 14 July 1968 in Aosta, Italy) is a retired Italian basketball player.

== See also ==
- Basketball in Italy
