= Amy Cissé =

French basketball player

Medal record

Representing France

European Championships
Silver medal – second place	1993 Italy	Team

Amy Cissé (born August 28, 1969 in Brignoles) is a French basketball player. Cissé has had 79 selections on the French national women's basketball team from 1989 to 1994.
