= Elisabeth Cebrián =

Spanish basketball player (born 1971)

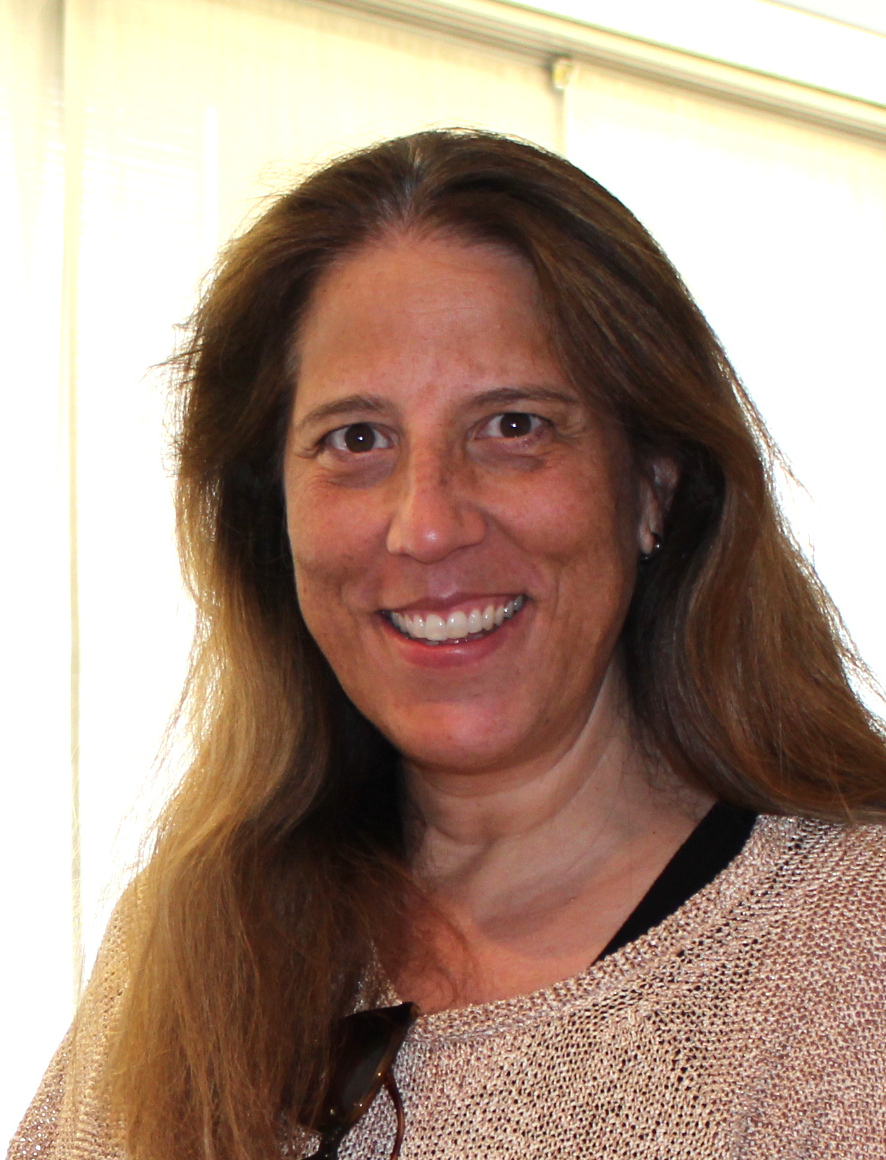

Personal information
- Born: February 7, 1971 (age 55) Reus
- Listed height: 196 cm (6 ft 5 in)
- Listed weight: 90 kg (198 lb)

Career information
- Playing career: 1987–2006
- Position: Center
- Number: 14

Career history
- 1987-1988: Raventós Catasús
- 1988–1989: A.C.R.A.
- 1989–1994: BEX Banco Exterior
- 1994-1995: Costa Naranja Godella
- 1995-1998: Universitari
- 1998: New York Liberty
- 1998-2000: Banco Simeón
- 2000-2002: Universitat UB
- 2002–2004: CB Estudiantes
- 2004-2006: Universitari

Career highlights
- 5× Spanish League champion (1988, 1995, 1999, 2000, 2005); 4x Spanish Cup champion (1988, 1993, 1995, 2001)
- Stats at Basketball Reference

Elisabeth Cebrián Scheurer (born 7 February 1971) is a Spanish former basketball player who competed in the 1992 Summer Olympics and in the 2004 Summer Olympics. She was part of the squad which became European champions in Perugia in 1993.

She is one of the players with the most appearances in the Spanish national team with 252 caps.

Nowadays, Cebrián works for FIBA Europe as member of the Women's Basketball Commission.

== Club career ==
She made her debut in the Spanish league with Raventós Catasús at 16. As one of the most promising young players of her time, she got transferred to the Caja Toledo - BEX Banco Exterior project, with other young Spanish prospects in order to prepare for the 1992 Summer Olympics. She went on to play for some of the most important clubs in the Spanish league, like Costa Naranja, Universitari, and Celta Vigo, winning a total of five Spanish leagues and four Spanish cups.

She was one of the first foreign players to be signed to the newly formed WNBA, playing at New York Liberty in 1998.

== National team ==
She made her debut with Spain women's national basketball team at the age of 18. She played with the senior team for 15 years, from 1989 to 2004. She is one of the most capped players with a total of 252 caps and 7.8 PPG. She participated in two Olympic Games (Barcelona 1992 and Athens 2004), three World Championships and five European Championships:

- 6th 1988 FIBA Europe Under-18 Championship for Women (youth)
- 5th 1989 FIBA Under-19 World Championship for Women (youth)
- 1990 FIBA Europe Under-18 Championship for Women (youth)
- 5th 1992 Summer Olympics
- 1993 Eurobasket
- 8th 1994 World Championship
- 9th 1995 Eurobasket
- 5th 1997 Eurobasket
- 5th 1998 World Championship
- 2001 Eurobasket
- 5th 2002 World Championship
- 2003 Eurobasket
- 6th 2004 Summer Olympics

== Career statistics ==
Legend
GP	Games played	GS	Games started	MPG	Minutes per game	RPG	Rebounds per game
APG	Assists per game	SPG	Steals per game	BPG	Blocks per game	PPG	Points per game
TO	Turnovers per game	FG%	Field-goal percentage	3P%	3-point field-goal percentage	FT%	Free-throw percentage
**Bold**	Career best	°	League leader

=== WNBA ===
Year	Team	GP	GS	MPG	FG%	3P%	FT%	RPG	APG	SPG	BPG	TO	PPG
1998	New York	22	0	8.5	.429	–	.571	1.2	.4	.0	.3	.9	1.7
