= Ana Belén Álvaro =

Spanish basketball player (born 1969)

Personal information
- Born: 24 April 1969 (age 57) Cuenca, Spain
- Listed height: 168 cm (5 ft 6 in)

Career information
- Playing career: 1984–2002
- Position: Point guard

Career history
- 1984-1986: Mecalux Hospitalet
- 1986-1988: Natural Cusí
- 1988-1989: Caja Toledo
- 1989-1992: BEX Banco Exterior
- 1992-1996: Dorna Godella / Costa Naranja
- 1996-1997: Pool Getafe
- 1998-2001: Valenciennes Olympic
- 2001-2002: Esportiu Universitari

Career highlights
- FIBA European Champions Cup champion (1993); Interclub World Cup (1992); 6x Liga Femenina champion (1993, 1994, 1995, 1996, 1997); 4x Copa de la Reina champion (1994, 1995, 1997); Ligue Féminine de Basketball champion (2001); Coupe de France (2001)

Ana Belén Álvaro Bascuñana (Note: In this Spanish name, the first or paternal surname is Álvaro and the second or maternal family name is Bascuñana.) (born 24 April 1969) is a former Spanish basketball player, representing Spain from 1988 to 2002 and winning a gold medal at the 1993 European Championship. At club level, she won the 1993 FIBA European Champions Cup and 6 Liga Femenina titles.

== Club career ==
After playing in her childhood club at Mollet del Vallès, she went to Hospitalet to play for Mecalux in 1984, thus making her debut in Liga Femenina at 15. After Mecalux resigned its position in the top tier, she played for Natural Cusí in nearby El Masnou, where she spent two seasons. As one of the most promising young players of her time, she got transferred to the Caja Toledo - BEX Banco Exterior project, with other young Spanish prospects in order to prepare for the 1992 Summer Olympics. After the Olympic tournament, she won back-to-back leagues with Dorna Godella and Pool Getafe. With Dorna Godella she went to win the 1992-93 FIBA European Champions Cup. She had another successful spell at French club Union Sportive Valenciennes Olympic, where she won one French league, one French cup and became runner-up of the 2000-2001 Euroleague.

== National team ==
She made her debut with Spain women's national basketball team at the age of 19. She played with the senior team for 14 years, from 1988 to 2002, with a total of 204 caps and 8.5 PPG. She participated in the 1992 Barcelona Olympics, 2 World Championships and in three European Championships:

- 9th 1985 FIBA Europe Under-16 Championship for Women (youth)
- 12th 1986 FIBA Europe Under-18 Championship for Women (youth)
- 6th 1988 FIBA Europe Under-18 Championship for Women (youth)
- 5th 1989 FIBA Under-19 World Championship for Women (youth)
- 5th 1992 Summer Olympics
- 1993 Eurobasket
- 8th 1994 World Championship
- 9th 1995 Eurobasket
- 5th 1997 Eurobasket
- 5th 1998 World Championship

== Coaching career ==
She became assistant coach in the French club St. Amaund Leseau in 2003. Back in Spain she continued her coaching career in clubs of the Valencian Community, including her old club Dorna Godella (renamed Ros Casares) and other male and female clubs.
