= Bruno Coqueran =

French basketball player

Kennard Winchester
Personal information
- Born: 19 June 1970 (age 56) Créteil, France
- Listed height: 6 ft 9 in (2.06 m)

Career information
- Playing career: 1989–2003
- Position: Power forward

Career history
- 1989–1992: Cholet Basket
- 1992–1993: ASVEL Villeurbanne
- 1993–1997: Cholet Basket
- 1997–1999: Le Mans Sarthe
- 1999–2000: ALM Évreux
- 2000–2002: Strasbourg IG
- 2002: ALM Évreux
- 2002–2003: Besançon BCD

Bruno Coqueran (born 19 June 1970 in Créteil, France) is a French basketball player who played 19 matches for the French men's national basketball team from 1993–1994.
