= Mónica Pulgar =

Spanish basketball player

Personal information
- Nationality: Spanish
- Born: 19 May 1971 (age 53); León, Spain

Sport
- Sport: Basketball

Mónica Pulgar (born 19 May 1971) is a Spanish basketball player. She competed in the women's tournament at the 1992 Summer Olympics.
