= Angela Adamoli =

Italian basketball player (born 1972)

Angela Adamoli (born 15 June 1972 in Livorno) is a former Italian basketball player.
