= Angela Arcangeli =

Italian basketball player (born 1971)

Personal information
- Nationality: Italian
- Born: 12 April 1971 (age 53); Rimini, Italy

Sport
- Sport: Basketball

Angela Arcangeli (born 12 April 1971) is an Italian basketball player. She competed in the women's tournament at the 1992 Summer Olympics.
