= Almudena Vara =

Spanish basketball player

Personal information
- Nationality: Spanish
- Born: 23 March 1971 (age 53); Madrid, Spain

Sport
- Sport: Basketball

Almudena Vara (born 23 March 1971) is a Spanish basketball player. She competed in the women's tournament at the 1992 Summer Olympics.
