= Margarita Geuer =

Spanish basketball player

Personal information
- Born: 3 May 1966 (age 58); Seville, Spain
- Listed height: 185 cm (6 ft 1 in)

Career information
- Playing career: 1983–1993
- Position: Center

Career history
- 1984-1986: Real Canoe NC
- 1986-1988: CD Xuncas
- 1988-1992: BEX Banco Exterior
- 1992-1993: Dorna Godella

Career highlights
- FIBA European Champions Cup champion (1993); Interclub World Cup (1992); 4x Liga Femenina champion (1984, 1985, 1986, 1993)

Margarita Ivonne "Wonny" Geuer Draeger (born 3 May 1966) is a former Spanish basketball player who represented Spain from 1985 to 1993 and winning a gold medal at the 1993 European Championship. At club level, she won the 1993 FIBA European Champions Cup and 4 Liga Femenina titles.

== Club career ==
Geuer started playing at 14, in Irlandesas de Bamí and Medicina Oximper in her hometown of Sevilla. At 17, she started her senior career at Real Canoe NC, where she won three consecutive Liga Femenina titles, from 1984 to 1986. She spent the next two years in Lugo at CD Xuncas, where she was runner-up in the 1987 league and in the 1987 and 1988 Copa de la Reina. She spent the next four years at the BEX Banco Exterior team, where the most talented Spanish players were recruited in order to compete in the 1992 Summer Olympics held in Barcelona.

Geuer's last year as a professional was at Dorna Godella, where she won the FIBA Club World Cup in September 1992 in Brazil, and the 1993 Liga Femenina and the FIBA European Champions Cup.

== National team ==
Geuer made her debut with Spain women's national basketball team at the age of 19. She played with the senior team for 8 years, from 1985 to 1993, with a total of 158 caps and 10.9 PPG. She participated in the 1992 Barcelona Olympics and in three European Championships:

- 10th 1985 Eurobasket
- 6th 1987 Eurobasket
- 5th 1992 Summer Olympics
- 1993 Eurobasket

Geuer retired from the national team and from professional basketball at the age of 27, with a gold medal in the 1993 European Championship final in Perugia.

== Personal life ==
Born of German parents in Spain and married to former basketball player Guillermo Hernangómez Heredero, Geuer is the mother of Euroleague players Willy Hernangómez (playing for FC Barcelona) and Juancho Hernangómez (playing for Greek giants Panathinaikos BC).
