= Blanca Ares =

Spanish basketball player

Personal information
- Born: 30 December 1970 (age 55) Madrid, Spain
- Listed height: 180 cm (5 ft 11 in)

Career information
- Playing career: 1986–1997
- Position: Small forward

Career history
- 1986-1988: Kerrygold Islas Canarias
- 1988-1989: Caja Toledo
- 1989-1994: BEX Banco Exterior
- 1994-1996: Costa Naranja
- 1996-1997: Pool Getafe

Career highlights
- 3x Liga Femenina champion (1995, 1996, 1997); 3x Copa de la Reina champion (1993, 1995, 1997)

Blanca Ares Torres (Note: In this Spanish name, the first or paternal surname is Ares and the second or maternal family name is Torres.) (born 30 December 1970) is a former Spanish basketball player, representing Spain from 1988 to 1994 and winning a gold medal at the 1993 European Championship, scoring 24 points in the final against France.

== Club career ==
Born and raised in Madrid, her family moved to Las Palmas (Canary Islands) when she was 13. She made her debut in the Liga Femenina de Baloncesto with local club Sandra Gran Canaria under coach Domingo Díaz. As one of the most promising young players of her time, she got transferred to the Caja Toledo - BEX Banco Exterior project, with other young Spanish prospects in order to prepare for the 1992 Summer Olympics.

After the Olympic tournament, she won back-to-back leagues with Dorna Godella and Pool Getafe.

She was the first Spanish player to be called to the recently formed WNBA, but she retired from professional basketball at the age of 26.

== National team ==
She made her debut with Spain women's national basketball team at the age of 18. She played with the senior team for 6 years, from 1988 to 1994, with a total of 124 caps and 14.1 PPG. She participated in the 1992 Barcelona Olympics, one World Championship and one European Championship:

- 9th 1987 FIBA Europe Under-16 Championship for Women (youth)
- 6th 1988 FIBA Europe Under-18 Championship for Women (youth)
- 5th 1989 FIBA Under-19 World Championship for Women (youth)
- 5th 1992 Summer Olympics
- 1993 Eurobasket
- 8th 1994 World Championship
