= Patricia Hernández (basketball) =

Spanish basketball player

Personal information
- Nationality: Spanish
- Born: 8 September 1970 (age 54); Las Palmas, Spain

Sport
- Sport: Basketball

Patricia Hernández (born 8 September 1970) is a Spanish basketball player. She competed in the women's tournament at the 1992 Summer Olympics.
