= Marina Ferragut =

Spanish basketball player (born 1972)

Personal information
- Born: February 11, 1972 (age 54) Barcelona
- Listed height: 191 cm (6 ft 3 in)

Career information
- Playing career: 1989–2011
- Position: Center

Career history
- 1987-1989: Fontvella Manresa
- 1989–1994: BEX Banco Exterior
- 1994-1996: Costa Naranja Godella
- 1996-1998: Real Canoe NC
- 1997-1998: BAC Mirande
- 1998-1999: Limoges ABC
- 1999-2000: Santo André
- 2000: New York Liberty
- 2000–2001: Ros Casares Valencia
- 2001-2003: Filtros Mann Zaragoza
- 2003-2004: Perfumerías Avenida
- 2004-2006: Hondarribia - Irún
- 2006-2009: Ros Casares Valencia
- 2009-2010: Real Canoe NC
- 2010-2011: Hondarribia - Irún

Career highlights
- 6× Spanish League champion (1995, 1996, 2001, 2007, 2008, 2009); 5x Spanish Cup champion (1993, 1995, 2007, 2008, 2009 ); WNBA conference champion (2000); Brazilian league (1999); South American Women's Basketball League champion (1999)
- Stats at Basketball Reference

Marina Ferragut Castillo (born 11 February 1972 in Barcelona) is a Spanish former basketball player who competed in the 1992 Summer Olympics and in the 2004 Summer Olympics, achieving a total of 253 caps for the national team. She played in the WNBA at the New York Liberty during the 2000 season. She played on 253 occasions with the Spanish National team. She retired in 2011.

== Club career ==
She played at Fontvella Manresa from her junior years to her debut with the senior team at 15. As one of the most promising young players of her time, she got transferred to the Caja Toledo - BEX Banco Exterior project, with other young Spanish prospects in order to prepare for the 1992 Summer Olympics. She went on to play for some of the most important clubs in the Spanish league, like Ros Casares Valencia, CB Avenida, CDB Zaragoza and Real Canoe NC, winning a total of six Spanish leagues and 5 Spanish cups.

Between 1997 and 2000 she played for French clubs BAC Mirande and Limoges ABC, Brazilian team Santo André (winning one Brazilian league and one South American cup) and WNBA team New York Liberty (becoming Western Conference champion in 2000).

== National team ==
She made her debut with Spain women's national basketball team at the age of 17. She played with the senior team for 17 years, from 1989 to 2006. She is one of the most capped players with a total of 253 caps and 7.4 PPG. She participated in two Olympic Games (Barcelona 1992 and Athens 2004), three World Championships and five European Championships:

- 9th 1987 FIBA Europe Under-16 Championship for Women (youth)
- 6th 1988 FIBA Europe Under-18 Championship for Women (youth)
- 5th 1989 FIBA Under-19 World Championship for Women (youth)
- 4th 1989 FIBA Europe Under-16 Championship for Women (youth)
- 1990 FIBA Europe Under-18 Championship for Women (youth)
- 5th 1992 Summer Olympics
- 1993 Eurobasket
- 8th 1994 World Championship
- 5th 1997 Eurobasket
- 5th 1998 World Championship
- 2001 Eurobasket
- 5th 2002 World Championship
- 2003 Eurobasket
- 6th 2004 Summer Olympics
- 2005 Eurobasket
