= EuroBasket Women 1995 =

1995 edition of the EuroBasket Women

EuroBasket 1995 Women
25th FIBA European Women's Basketball Championship

Tournament details
- Host country: Czech Republic
- City: Brno
- Dates: 8–18 June
- Teams: 14

Final positions
- Champions: Ukraine (1st title)
- Runners-up: Italy
- Third place: Russia
- Fourth place: Slovakia

Official website
- Official website (archive)

The 1995 European Women Basketball Championship, commonly called EuroBasket Women 1995, was the 25th regional championship held by FIBA Europe. The competition was held in Brno in Czech Republic and took place from 8 June to 18 June 1995. Ukraine won the gold medal and Italy the silver medal while Russia won the bronze.

== Qualification ==
=== First stage ===
==== Group A ====
| Pl | Team | Pld | W | L | PF | PA |
|---|---|---|---|---|---|---|
| 1 | Sweden | 3 | 3 | 0 | 272 | 178 |
| 2 | Latvia | 3 | 2 | 1 | 245 | 169 |
| 3 | Denmark | 3 | 1 | 2 | 209 | 208 |
| 4 | Scotland | 3 | 0 | 3 | 135 | 306 |

| | (Sweden) | (Latvia) | (Denmark) | (Scotland) |
|---|---|---|---|---|
| Sweden | | 81–75 | 77–66 | 114–37 |
| Latvia | | | 66–55 | 104–33 |
| Denmark | | | | 88–65 |
| Scotland | | | | |

==== Group B ====
| Pl | Team | Pld | W | L | PF | PA |
|---|---|---|---|---|---|---|
| 1 | Lithuania | 3 | 3 | 0 | 229 | 184 |
| 2 | Greece | 3 | 2 | 1 | 198 | 176 |
| 3 | Belgium | 3 | 1 | 2 | 163 | 191 |
| 4 | Portugal | 3 | 0 | 3 | 157 | 196 |

| | (Lithuania) | (Greece) | (Belgium) | (Portugal) |
|---|---|---|---|---|
| Lithuania | | 77–74 | 79–54 | 73–54 |
| Greece | | | 57–51 | 67–48 |
| Belgium | | | | 56–55 |
| Portugal | | | | |

==== Group C ====
| Pl | Team | Pld | W | L | PF | PA |
|---|---|---|---|---|---|---|
| 1 | Croatia | 3 | 3 | 0 | 231 | 194 |
| 2 | Romania | 3 | 2 | 1 | 188 | 171 |
| 3 | Belarus | 3 | 1 | 2 | 210 | 210 |
| 4 | Estonia | 3 | 0 | 3 | 175 | 229 |

| | (Croatia) | (Romania) | (Belarus) | (Estonia) |
|---|---|---|---|---|
| Croatia | | 71–61 | 78–74 | 82–59 |
| Romania | | | 67–49 | 60–51 |
| Belarus | | | | 87–65 |
| Estonia | | | | |

==== Group D ====
| Pl | Team | Pld | W | L | PF | PA |
|---|---|---|---|---|---|---|
| 1 | Slovenia | 2 | 2 | 0 | 193 | 116 |
| 2 | (Georgia (country)) Georgia | 2 | 1 | 1 | 127 | 144 |
| 3 | Austria | 2 | 0 | 2 | 117 | 177 |

| | (Slovenia) | (Georgia (country)) | (Austria) |
|---|---|---|---|
| Slovenia | | 82–61 | 111–55 |
| (Georgia (country)) Georgia | | | 66–62 |
| Austria | | | |

==== Group E ====
| Pl | Team | Pld | W | L | PF | PA |
|---|---|---|---|---|---|---|
| 1 | Ukraine | 3 | 3 | 0 | 227 | 200 |
| 2 | Moldova | 3 | 2 | 1 | 222 | 215 |
| 3 | Israel | 3 | 1 | 2 | 212 | 231 |
| 4 | Turkey | 3 | 0 | 3 | 218 | 233 |

| | (Ukraine) | (Moldova) | (Israel) | (Turkey) |
|---|---|---|---|---|
| Ukraine | | 80–70 | 77–64 | 70–66 |
| Moldova | | | 73–64 | 79–71 |
| Israel | | | | 84–81 |
| Turkey | | | | |

=== Second stage ===
==== Group A ====
| Pl | Team | Pld | W | L | PF | PA |
|---|---|---|---|---|---|---|
| 1 | Croatia | 5 | 4 | 1 | 369 | 325 |
| 2 | Italy | 5 | 4 | 1 | 305 | 251 |
| 3 | Lithuania | 5 | 3 | 2 | 352 | 324 |
| 4 | Hungary | 5 | 2 | 3 | 309 | 320 |
| 5 | Latvia | 5 | 2 | 3 | 299 | 322 |
| 6 | Finland | 5 | 0 | 5 | 321 | 413 |

| | (Croatia) | (Italy) | (Lithuania) | (Hungary) | (Latvia) | (Finland) |
|---|---|---|---|---|---|---|
| Croatia | | 58–50 | 76–72 | 80–66 | | 87–67 |
| Italy | | | 66–59 | 61–40 | 63–44 | 65–50 |
| Lithuania | | | | 69–56 | 62–51 | 90–75 |
| Hungary | | | | | 60–50 | 87–60 |
| Latvia | 70–68 | | | | | 84–69 |
| Finland | | | | | | |

==== Group B ====
| Pl | Team | Pld | W | L | PF | PA |
|---|---|---|---|---|---|---|
| 1 | Ukraine | 5 | 4 | 1 | 314 | 279 |
| 2 | Russia | 5 | 3 | 2 | 345 | 332 |
| 3 | Romania | 5 | 3 | 2 | 319 | 291 |
| 4 | Poland | 5 | 2 | 3 | 289 | 291 |
| 5 | Netherlands | 5 | 2 | 3 | 292 | 307 |
| 6 | Slovenia | 5 | 1 | 4 | 304 | 363 |

| | (Ukraine) | (Russia) | (Romania) | (Poland) | (Netherlands) | (Slovenia) |
|---|---|---|---|---|---|---|
| Ukraine | | 80–74 | 59–55 | 60–49 | 59–42 | |
| Russia | | | 64–60 | 57–55 | | 90–62 |
| Romania | | | | 53–52 | 72–52 | 79–64 |
| Poland | | | | | 60–58 | 73–63 |
| Netherlands | | 75–60 | | | | 65–56 |
| Slovenia | 59–56 | | | | | |

=== Group C ===
| Pl | Team | Pld | W | L | PF | PA |
|---|---|---|---|---|---|---|
| 1 | Slovakia | 5 | 5 | 0 | 423 | 349 |
| 2 | Moldova | 5 | 4 | 1 | 372 | 330 |
| 3 | Germany | 5 | 2 | 3 | 387 | 386 |
| 4 | Bulgaria | 5 | 2 | 3 | 340 | 364 |
| 5 | Sweden | 5 | 2 | 3 | 395 | 404 |
| 6 | Greece | 5 | 0 | 5 | 297 | 381 |

| | (Slovakia) | (Moldova) | (Germany) | (Bulgaria) | (Sweden) | (Greece) |
|---|---|---|---|---|---|---|
| Slovakia | | 65–56 | 100–79 | 82–71 | 100–89 | 76–54 |
| Moldova | | | 79–70 | 76–59 | 77–68 | 84–68 |
| Germany | | | | | 103–74 | 69–54 |
| Bulgaria | | | 79–66 | | | 66–62 |
| Sweden | | | | 78–65 | | 86–59 |
| Greece | | | | | | |

=== Additional stage ===
| Pl | Team | Pld | W | L | PF | PA |
|---|---|---|---|---|---|---|
| 1 | (Federal Republic of Yugoslavia) Yugoslavia | 3 | 3 | 0 | 236 | 190 |
| 2 | Hungary | 3 | 2 | 1 | 243 | 215 |
| 3 | Bulgaria | 3 | 1 | 2 | 220 | 270 |
| 4 | Poland | 3 | 1 | 2 | 232 | 256 |

| | (Federal Republic of Yugoslavia) | (Hungary) | (Bulgaria) | (Poland) |
|---|---|---|---|---|
| (Federal Republic of Yugoslavia) Yugoslavia | | 72–61 | 88–61 | 76–68 |
| Hungary | | | 95–66 | 87–77 |
| Bulgaria | | | | 93–87 |
| Poland | | | | |

== First stage ==
=== Group A ===
| Pl | Team | Pld | W | L | PF | PA |
|---|---|---|---|---|---|---|
| 1 | Italy | 6 | 6 | 0 | 374 | 329 |
| 2 | Russia | 6 | 5 | 1 | 459 | 387 |
| 3 | Czech Republic | 6 | 4 | 2 | 422 | 408 |
| 4 | Lithuania | 6 | 2 | 4 | 396 | 408 |
| 5 | (Federal Republic of Yugoslavia) Yugoslavia | 6 | 2 | 4 | 353 | 382 |
| 6 | France | 6 | 2 | 4 | 394 | 430 |
| 7 | Germany | 6 | 0 | 6 | 387 | 441 |

| | (Italy) | (Russia) | (Czech Republic) | (Lithuania) | (Federal Republic of Yugoslavia) | (France) | (Germany) |
|---|---|---|---|---|---|---|---|
| Italy | | 59–57 | 63–54 | 60–55 | 63–46 | 64–61 | 65–56 |
| Russia | | | 75–72 | 76–67 | 76–62 | 78–55 | 97–72 |
| Czech Republic | | | | 78–65 | 67–62 | 79–74 | 72–69 |
| Lithuania | | | | | 59–51 | | 80–71 |
| (Federal Republic of Yugoslavia) Yugoslavia | | | | | | 74–63 | 58–54 |
| France | | | | 72–70 | | | 69–65 |
| Germany | | | | | | | |

=== Group B ===
| Pl | Team | Pld | W | L | PF | PA |
|---|---|---|---|---|---|---|
| 1 | Ukraine | 6 | 5 | 1 | 416 | 359 |
| 2 | Slovakia | 6 | 5 | 1 | 417 | 353 |
| 3 | Croatia | 6 | 4 | 2 | 428 | 414 |
| 4 | Moldova | 6 | 3 | 3 | 410 | 451 |
| 5 | Spain | 6 | 2 | 4 | 493 | 453 |
| 6 | Romania | 6 | 1 | 5 | 368 | 439 |
| 7 | Hungary | 6 | 1 | 5 | 418 | 461 |

| | (Ukraine) | (Slovakia) | (Croatia) | (Moldova) | (Spain) | (Romania) | (Hungary) |
|---|---|---|---|---|---|---|---|
| Ukraine | | 61–59 | | 68–61 | 73–54 | 71–61 | 75–55 |
| Slovakia | | | 71–67 | 74–70 | 72–66 | 81–56 | 60–53 |
| Croatia | 69–68 | | | | 73–70 | 68–57 | 75–70 |
| Moldova | | | 78–76 | | | 63–59 | 79–73 |
| Spain | | | | 101–59 | | 97–68 | |
| Romania | | | | | | | 67–59 |
| Hungary | | | | | 108–105 | | |

== Final stages ==
Quarter-finals
Italy | 74
Moldova | 43
Slovakia | 85
Czech Republic | 75
Ukraine | 76
Lithuania | 72
Russia | 81
Croatia | 72

Semi-finals
Italy | 65
Slovakia | 46
Ukraine | 69
Russia | 64

Final
Italy | 66
Ukraine | 77
Third place
Slovakia | 50
Russia | 69

5th to 8th places
Moldova | 78
Czech Republic | 76
Lithuania | 91
Croatia | 64

Fifth place
Moldova | 62
Lithuania | 68
Seventh place
(Czech Republic) Czech republic | 73
Croatia | 61

1995 FIBA European Women's Basketball Championship champion

Ukraine
First title

== Final standings ==
| Qualified for the 1996 Summer Olympics |

| Place | Team | PE |
|---|---|---|
| Gold medal | Ukraine | New entry |
| Silver medal | Italy | ▲2 |
| Bronze medal | Russia | ▲4 |
| 4 | Slovakia | ▼1 |
| 5 | Lithuania | New entry |
| 6 | Moldova | New entry |
| 7 | Czech Republic | New entry |
| 8 | Croatia | New entry |
| 9 | Spain | ▼8 |
| 10 | (Federal Republic of Yugoslavia) Yugoslavia | New entry |
| 11 | France | ▼9 |
| 12 | Hungary | ▼4 |
| 13 | Romania | New entry |
| 14 | Germany | New entry |
