= Spain women's national basketball team =

Women's national basketball team representing Spain

Spain
- FIBA ranking: 3 ▲3 (14 September 2026)
- Joined FIBA: 1934
- FIBA zone: FIBA Europe
- National federation: FEB
- Coach: Miguel Méndez

Olympic Games
- Appearances: 6
- Medals: (silver) Silver: (2016)

World Cup
- Appearances: 8
- Medals: (silver) Silver: (2014); (bronze) Bronze: (2010, 2018, 2026)

EuroBasket
- Appearances: 23
- Medals: (gold) Gold: (1993, 2013, 2017, 2019); (silver) Silver: (2007, 2023, 2025); (bronze) Bronze: (2001, 2003, 2005, 2009, 2015)
Home	Away

First international
- Spain 31–40 Switzerland (Malgrat de Mar, Spain; 16 June 1963)

Biggest win
- Spain 113–42 Fiji (Madrid, Spain; 9 June 2008)

Biggest defeat
- Soviet Union 115–42 Spain (Treviso, Italy; 12 September 1985)
Medal record
Event	1st	2nd	3rd
Olympic Games	0	1	0
Women's World Cup	0	1	3
EuroBasket Women	4	3	5
Mediterranean Games	1	0	3
Total	5	5	11

The Spain women's national basketball team (Spanish: Selección Española de Baloncesto Femenina) represents Spain in international women's basketball competition and are regulated by the Spanish Basketball Federation, the governing body for basketball in Spain. Spain has one of the most successful women's national teams in the world, being the current FIBA Women's EuroBasket 2025 silver medallists.

== History ==
Spain women's basketball team played their first official game in Malgrat de Mar, Barcelona, against Switzerland on 16 June 1963, losing 31–40. They won their first game against the same team two days later, 47–39. It would take six years to play another international friendly game, losing to Cuba 50–70 on 28 September 1969.

Their first official games were in March 1970, trying to qualify for the 1970 EuroBasket, winning their first game against Switzerland 61–44 and losing to Hungary and France. The team qualified for their first major international tournament in their next attempt, the 1974 EuroBasket. After losing their three group stage games, they won their first game in a final tournament against Denmark in the placement matches, finishing in 12th position. Rosa Castillo is considered the best player from the mid-1970s to the mid-1980s.

Until 1985, Spain played most Eurobasket tournaments, usually finishing around 10th. An important year for the evolution of the team was the celebration on home soil of the 1987 EuroBasket, finishing on 6th position. The team entered their first Summer Olympics qualification in 1988, but failed to qualify. Their first Olympic games were also on home soil in the 1992 Summer Olympics, finishing 5th.

After failing to qualify for the two previous Eurobaskets and having never played a knockout game in a major tournament, the gold medal at the 1993 EuroBasket came as a surprise, beating the newly formed Slovakia in the semi-finals 73–55 and France in the final 63–53. With Blanca Ares as their key player (19 PPG), Spain undoubtedly took advantage of the dissolution of the dominant European teams of Yugoslavia, Czechoslovakia, and especially the Soviet Union.

The EuroBasket victory gave Spain the right to participate in the 1994 Women's World Cup for the first time, finishing 8th. The team qualified for seven consecutive World Cups, winning three medals.

From 2001 up to 2009, Spain entered a loop of winning five consecutive medals in the Eurobaskets (1 silver, 4 bronze) and being eliminated in the quarterfinals in Summer Olympics and World Cups, until they finally won bronze in the 2010 Women's World Cup. From her debut in 1995 to her retirement in 2013, forward Amaya Valdemoro became the leader of the Spanish squad, taking part in 13 tournaments, playing 258 games, winning 7 medals and becoming the top scorer with 2,746 points.

The defeat against Croatia on 26 June in Katowice in the second stage of the 2011 EuroBasket and the consequent absence from the 2012 Olympics has been cited by coaches and players as a catalyst for a golden period of seven consecutive medals under coach Lucas Mondelo. After playing the qualification matches in the summer of 2012, Spain went on to win the 2013 EuroBasket with a balance of 9–0. Afterwards, they won silver in the 2014 Women's World Cup, bronze in the 2015 EuroBasket, silver in the 2016 Summer Olympics and gold again in the 2017 EuroBasket. Spain also won the bronze medal at the 2018 Women's World Cup held on home soil in September 2018. In July 2019 Spain successfully defended their European crown by beating France 86–66 in the final of the EuroBasket Women 2019. These seven successful tournaments came to a halt in the summer of 2021, when the team finished 7th in the 2021 EuroBasket played on home soil and 6th in the 2020 Olympic Games. These results are quite commendable, considering that Spain have only competed with the world elite for two decades. This series of results under coach Lucas Mondelo (2012-2021) took the Spanish team to be ranked No. 2 in the ranking of FIBA. In the senior team for two decades (2002-2021) point guard Laia Palau is the record-holder for most caps (314) and most medals (12) in 19 final tournaments.

Having failed to qualify for the 2022 FIBA Women's Basketball World Cup, a new cycle began with the appointment of veteran Euroleague Women coach Miguel Méndez. In the 2023 and 2025 Eurobaskets, despite strong performances, they lost to Belgium in both finals, and the team was able to win their fourth World Cup medal in 2026, claiming the bronze medal.

In the team since 2008, forward Alba Torrens has been regarded as a talented player of her generation, having won 11 medals in 15 tournaments.

At the Mediterranean Games, Spain won gold in 1991, and bronze in 1993, 2001 and 2005.

== Competition record ==
=== Olympic Games ===
Olympic Games					Qualifying		
Year	Position	Pld	W	L	Pld	W	L
(Canada) 1976	Did not enter						
(Soviet Union) 1980	Did not enter						
(United States) 1984	Did not enter						
(South Korea) 1988	Did not qualify				5	2	3
(Spain) 1992	5th	5	3	2			
(United States) 1996	Did not qualify						
(Australia) 2000	Did not qualify						
(Greece) 2004	6th	7	4	3			
(China) 2008	5th	6	3	3	3	2	1
(United Kingdom) 2012	Did not qualify						
(Brazil) 2016	Silver medal	8	6	2	3	3	0
(Japan) 2020	6th	4	3	1	3	2	1
(France) 2024	5th	4	3	1	3	2	1
(United States) 2028	To be determined				To be determined		
Total		34	22	12	17	11	6

=== FIBA World Cup ===
Women's World Cup
Year	Position	Pld	W	L
(Chile) 1953	N/A (Team did not exist)			
(Brazil) 1957	N/A (Team did not exist)			
(Soviet Union) 1959	N/A (Team did not exist)			
(Peru) 1964	Did not enter			
(Czechoslovakia) 1967	Did not enter			
(Brazil) 1971	Did not enter			
(Colombia) 1975	Did not qualify			
(South Korea) 1979	Did not qualify			
(Brazil) 1983	Did not qualify			
(Soviet Union) 1986	Did not qualify			
(Malaysia) 1990	Did not qualify			
(Australia) 1994	8th	8	3	5
(Germany) 1998	5th	9	5	4
(China) 2002	5th	9	6	3
(Brazil) 2006	8th	9	4	5
(Czech Republic) 2010	Bronze medal	9	7	2
(Turkey) 2014	Silver medal	6	5	1
(Spain) 2018	Bronze medal	7	5	2
(Australia) 2022	Did not qualify			
(Germany) 2026	Bronze medal	6	4	2
(Japan) 2030	To be determined			
Total		63	39	24

=== EuroBasket Women ===
EuroBasket Women					Qualification		
Year	Position	Pld	W	L	Pld	W	L
(Italy) 1938	N/A (Team didn't exist)						
(Hungary) 1950	N/A (Team didn't exist)						
(Soviet Union) 1952	N/A (Team didn't exist)						
(Socialist Federal Republic of Yugoslavia) 1954	N/A (Team didn't exist)						
(Czechoslovakia) 1956	N/A (Team didn't exist)						
(Poland) 1958	N/A (Team didn't exist)						
(Bulgaria) 1960	N/A (Team didn't exist)						
(France) 1962	N/A (Team didn't exist)						
(Hungary) 1964	Did not enter						
(Romania) 1966	Did not enter						
(Italy) 1968	Did not enter						
(Netherlands) 1970	Did not qualify				3	1	2
(Bulgaria) 1972	Did not enter						
(Italy) 1974	12th	7	1	6	4	3	1
(France) 1976	10th	7	2	5	3	3	0
(Poland) 1978	11th	7	2	5	4	3	1
(Socialist Federal Republic of Yugoslavia) 1980	10th	7	4	3	3	3	0
(Italy) 1981	Did not qualify						
(Hungary) 1983	11th	7	1	6	4	3	1
(Italy) 1985	10th	7	3	4			
(Spain) 1987	6th	7	3	4			
(Bulgaria) 1989	Did not qualify				5	3	2
(Israel) 1991	Did not qualify				5	3	2
(Italy) 1993	Gold medal	5	4	1	5	3	2
(Czech Republic) 1995	9th	6	2	4			
(Hungary) 1997	5th	8	5	3	5	4	1
(Poland) 1999	Did not qualify				5	3	2
(France) 2001	Bronze medal	8	5	3	6	6	0
(Greece) 2003	Bronze medal	8	7	1	6	6	0
(Turkey) 2005	Bronze medal	8	6	2			
(Italy) 2007	Silver medal	9	7	2			
(Latvia) 2009	Bronze medal	9	8	1			
(Poland) 2011	9th	6	3	3			
(France) 2013	Gold medal	9	9	0	8	6	2
(Hungary) (Romania) 2015	Bronze medal	10	9	1			
(Czech Republic) 2017	Gold medal	6	5	1	4	4	0
(Serbia) (Latvia) 2019	Gold medal	6	6	0	6	6	0
(France) (Spain) 2021	7th	6	3	3			
(Israel) (Slovenia) 2023	Silver medal	6	4	2	6	6	0
(Czech Republic) (Germany) (Italy) (Greece) 2025	Silver medal	6	5	1	6	6	0
(Belgium) (Finland) (Sweden) (Lithuania) 2027	To be determined						
Total		165	104	61	90	74	16

== Fixtures and results ==
List of matches 2024–2027, including friendlies and scheduled matches
M	OPPONENT	F	A	+/-	TOP SCORER	PTS	EVENT	DATE	LOCATION
817	Croatia						2027 EuroBasket qualification	2027.02.16	
816	Bulgaria						2027 EuroBasket qualification	2027.02.13	
815	Czech Republic						2027 EuroBasket qualification	2027.02.10	
814	Croatia	91	72	+19	Raquel Carrera	24	2027 EuroBasket qualification	2026.11.17	Poreč (CRO)
813	Bulgaria	85	64	+21	Iyana Martín	26	2027 EuroBasket qualification	2026.11.14	Samokov (BUL)
812	Czech Republic	73	71	+2	Iyana Martín	18	2027 EuroBasket qualification	2026.11.10	Oviedo
811	Germany	81	58	+23	Iyana Martín	22	2026 World Cup 3P	2026.09.13	Berlin (GER)
810	United States	66	76	-10	Conde, Martín	17	2026 World Cup SF	2026.09.12	Berlin (GER)
809	Australia	89	66	+23	Megan Gustafson	16	2026 World Cup QF	2026.09.10	Berlin (GER)
808	Japan	79	59	+20	Iyana Martín	20	2026 World Cup 1R	2026.09.07	Berlin (GER)
807	Mali	73	82	-9	Iyana Martín	20	2026 World Cup 1R	2026.09.05	Berlin (GER)
806	Germany	83	53	+30	Awa Fam	17	2026 World Cup 1R	2026.09.04	Berlin (GER)
805	China	72	71	+1	Ortiz, Martín	13	2026 Friendly	2026.08.30	Zaragoza
804	Mali	97	58	+39	Torrens, Martín	13	2026 Friendly	2026.08.29	Zaragoza
803	Belgium	95	67	+28	Pueyo, Martín	15	2026 Friendly	2026.08.23	Santa Cruz de Tenerife
802	Nigeria	83	58	+25	Iyana Martín	15	2026 Friendly	2026.08.21	Santa Cruz de Tenerife
801	Germany	65	60	+5	Iyana Martín	19	2026 Friendly	2026.08.15	Ludwigsburg (GER)
800	United States	70	84	-14	Carrera, Gustafson	15	2026 World Cup qualification	2026.03.17	San Juan (PUR)
799	Italy	56	68	-12	Megan Gustafson	12	2026 World Cup qualification	2026.03.15	San Juan (PUR)
798	Puerto Rico	91	52	+39	Megan Gustafson	21	2026 World Cup qualification	2026.03.14	San Juan (PUR)
797	Senegal	84	51	+33	Iyana Martín	16	2026 World Cup qualification	2026.03.12	San Juan (PUR)
796	New Zealand	99	50	+49	Megan Gustafson	20	2026 World Cup qualification	2026.03.11	San Juan (PUR)
795	France	68	72	-4	Iyana Martín	16	2025 Friendly	2025.11.16	La Línea de la Concepción
794	Italy	61	77	-16	Iyana Martín	11	2025 Friendly	2025.11.14	La Línea de la Concepción
793	Belgium	65	67	-2	Ayuso, Ginzo, Pueyo	11	2025 EuroBasket F	2025.06.29	Piraeus (GRE)
792	France	65	64	+1	Awa Fam	21	2025 EuroBasket SF	2025.06.27	Piraeus (GRE)
791	Czech Republic	88	81	+7	Raquel Carrera	31	2025 EuroBasket QF	2025.06.25	Piraeus (GRE)
790	Sweden	78	75	+3	Alba Torrens	20	2025 EuroBasket 1R	2025.06.22	Hamburg (GER)
789	Germany	79	60	+19	Raquel Carrera	20	2025 EuroBasket 1R	2025.06.20	Hamburg (GER)
788	Great Britain	85	70	+15	Iyana Martín	14	2025 EuroBasket 1R	2025.06.19	Hamburg (GER)
787	Switzerland	94	64	+30	Paula Ginzo	24	2025 Friendly	2025.06.11	Viana (POR)
786	Portugal	68	59	+9	Aina Ayuso	11	2025 Friendly	2025.06.10	Viana (POR)
785	Italy	57	42	+15	Irati Etxarri	9	2025 Friendly	2025.06.01	Inca
784	Greece	64	40	+24	Awa Fam Thiam	11	2025 Friendly	2025.05.30	Inca
783	Netherlands	81	64	+17	Megan Gustafson	27	2025 EuroBasket qualification	2025.02.09	Almere (NED)
782	Austria	76	45	+31	Megan Gustafson	18	2025 EuroBasket qualification	2025.02.06	Vienna (AUT)
781	Croatia	78	62	+16	Paula Ginzo	15	2025 EuroBasket qualification	2024.11.10	Castellón
780	Netherlands	66	59	+7	María Conde	17	2025 EuroBasket qualification	2024.11.07	Castellón
779	Belgium	66	79	-13	Megan Gustafson	21	2024 Olympics QF	2024.08.07	Paris (FRA)
778	Serbia	70	62	+8	María Conde	15	2024 Olympics 1R	2024.08.03	Lille (FRA)
777	Puerto Rico	63	62	+1	Megan Gustafson	18	2024 Olympics 1R	2024.07.31	Lille (FRA)
776	China	90	89	+1	Megan Gustafson	29	2024 Olympics 1R	2024.07.28	Lille (FRA)
775	Canada	68	48	+20	Queralt Casas	20	2024 Friendly	2024.07.24	Segovia
774	Australia	66	75	-9	Leonor Rodríguez	11	2024 Friendly	2024.07.22	Segovia
773	Canada	61	48	+13	Alba Torrens	11	2024 Friendly	2024.07.13	Charleroi (BEL)
772	Belgium	58	76	-18	María Conde	14	2024 Friendly	2024.07.12	Charleroi (BEL)
771	China	70	46	+24	María Conde	14	2024 Friendly	2024.06.23	Vigo
770	Turkey	59	47	+12	María Conde	11	2024 Friendly	2024.06.21	Vigo
769	Hungary	73	72	+1	María Conde	16	2024 Olympics qualification	2024.02.11	Sopron (HUN)
768	Canada	60	55	+5	Megan Gustafson	16	2024 Olympics qualification	2024.02.09	Sopron (HUN)
767	Japan	75	86	-11	Raquel Carrera	19	2024 Olympics qualification	2024.02.08	Sopron (HUN)

== Team ==
=== Current roster ===
Roster for the 2026 FIBA Women's Basketball World Cup.

Spain women's national basketball team roster
Players
Coaches

Pos.	No.	Name	Age – Date of birth	Height	Club	Ctr.
G	2	Elena Buenavida	22 – 8 March 2004	1.75 m (5 ft 9 in)	Valencia Basket	(Spain)
PG	4	Mariona Ortiz	34 – 28 February 1992	1.82 m (6 ft 0 in)	Basket Zaragoza	(Spain)
PG	5	Maite Cazorla	29 – 18 June 1997	1.78 m (5 ft 10 in)	USK Praha	(Czech Republic)
SF	7	Alba Torrens (C)	37 – 30 August 1989	1.92 m (6 ft 4 in)	AzulMarino Palma	(Spain)
SF	9	Helena Pueyo	25 – 13 February 2001	1.82 m (6 ft 0 in)	Valencia Basket	(Spain)
SF	10	María Conde	29 – 14 January 1997	1.87 m (6 ft 2 in)	Toronto Tempo	(Canada)
C	11	Awa Fam	20 – 17 June 2006	1.95 m (6 ft 5 in)	Seattle Storm	(United States)
PF	14	Raquel Carrera	24 – 31 October 2001	1.90 m (6 ft 3 in)	New York Liberty	(United States)
C	17	Megan DiLeo	29 – 13 December 1996	1.94 m (6 ft 4 in)	Portland Fire	(United States)
G	18	Alicia Flórez	22 – 19 April 2004	1.75 m (5 ft 9 in)	Valencia Basket	(Spain)
C	20	Paula Ginzo	28 – 16 February 1998	1.90 m (6 ft 3 in)	Žabiny Brno	(Czech Republic)
PG	44	Iyana Martín	20 – 18 January 2006	1.75 m (5 ft 9 in)	Spar Girona	(Spain)

Head coach

- (Spain) Miguel Méndez

Assistant coach(es)

- (Spain) Cristina Cantero
- (Spain) Raquel Romo
- (Spain) Anna Montañana

Legend

- **(C)** Team captain
- **Club** – describes last
  club before the tournament
- **Age** – describes age
  on 4 September 2026

=== Individual records ===
- **Bold** denotes players still playing international basketball.

As of 13 September 2026

==== Most capped players ====
#	Player	National career	Games	Points
1	Laia Palau	2002–2021	314	1839
2	Amaya Valdemoro	1995–2013	258	2743
3	Marina Ferragut	1989–2006	253	1867
4	Betty Cebrián	1989–2004	252	1978
5	Lucila Pascua	2001–2017	244	897
6	**Alba Torrens**	2008–	233	2704
7	Elisa Aguilar	1996–2013	222	1171
8	Silvia Domínguez	2006–2024	214	820
9	Ana Belén Álvaro	1988–2002	204	1730
10	Carolina Mújica	1984–1995	202	1264
11	Laura Nicholls	2008–2020	197	1068

==== Top scorers ====
#	Player	National career	Points	Matches	Average
1	Amaya Valdemoro	1995–2013	2746	258	10.6
2	**Alba Torrens**	2008–	2704	233	11.6
3	Betty Cebrián	1989–2004	1978	252	7.8
4	Marina Ferragut	1989–2006	1867	253	7.4
5	Laia Palau	2002–2021	1839	314	5.9
6	Blanca Ares	1988–1994	1754	124	14.1
7	Ana Belén Álvaro	1988–2002	1730	204	8.5
8	Margarita Geuer	1985–1993	1716	158	10.9
9	Rocío Jiménez	1974–1988	1487	127	11.7
10	Anna Montañana	2005–2012	1430	129	11.1

==== Top highscorers ====
Top highscorers in official games (friendlies not included).

As of 13 September 2026

Players	PTS	Opponent	Event	Date	Location
Amaya Valdemoro	39	Lithuania	2006 World Cup 2nd Round	2006.09.18	São Paulo (BRA)
Blanca Ares	36	Brazil	1994 World Cup 2nd Round	1994.06.10	Sydney (AUS)
Amaya Valdemoro	33	Brazil	2002 World Cup 2nd Round	2002.09.19	Suzhou (CHN)
Rosa Castillo	32	Belgium	1976 EuroBasket Classification Round	1976.05.25	Ferrand Clermont (FRA)
Rosa Castillo	32	Finland	1980 EuroBasket Classification Round	1980.09.23	Banjaluka (YUG)
Rosi Sánchez	32	China	2002 World Cup Classification Round	2002.09.25	Nanjing (CHN)
Alba Torrens	32	China	2016 Olympics 1st Round	2016.08.10	Rio (BRA)
Marina Ferragut	31	Latvia	1999 EuroBasket qualification	1998.05.15	Daruvar (CRO)
Marta Xargay	31	Ukraine	2019 EuroBasket 1st Round	2019.06.27	Riga (LAT)
Raquel Carrera	31	Czech Republic	2025 EuroBasket quarterfinals	2025.06.25	Piraeus (GRE)
Rocío Jiménez	30	England	1978 EuroBasket qualification	1978.03.23	Wolfenbuttel (GER)
Marta Fernández	30	Romania	2003 EuroBasket qualification	2001.11.25	Salamanca (ESP)
Amaya Valdemoro	30	China	2004 Olympics 1st Round	2004.08.16	Athens (GRE)
Alba Torrens	30	Russia	2013 EuroBasket 1st Round	2013.06.15	Vannes (FRA)

==== Top medallists ====
Most medals won with the national team in Olympic Games, Women's World Cups and EuroBaskets:

Player	Medals	Details
Laia Palau	12	Extended content: (bronze) 2003 EuroBasket; (bronze) 2005 EuroBasket; (silver) 2007 EuroBasket; (bronze) 2009 EuroBasket; (bronze) 2010 Women's World Cup; (gold) 2013 EuroBasket; (silver) 2014 Women's World Cup; (bronze) 2015 EuroBasket; (silver) 2016 Summer Olympics; (gold) 2017 EuroBasket; (bronze) 2018 Women's World Cup; (gold) 2019 EuroBasket
Alba Torrens	11	Extended content: (bronze) 2009 EuroBasket; (bronze) 2010 Women's World Cup; (gold) 2013 EuroBasket; (silver) 2014 Women's World Cup; (bronze) 2015 EuroBasket; (silver) 2016 Summer Olympics; (gold) 2017 EuroBasket; (bronze) 2018 Women's World Cup; (silver) 2023 EuroBasket; (silver) 2025 EuroBasket; (bronze) 2026 Women's World Cup
Silvia Domínguez	9	Extended content: (bronze) 2009 EuroBasket; (gold) 2013 EuroBasket; (silver) 2014 Women's World Cup; (bronze) 2015 EuroBasket; (silver) 2016 Summer Olympics; (gold) 2017 EuroBasket; (bronze) 2018 Women's World Cup; (gold) 2019 EuroBasket; (silver) 2023 EuroBasket
Laura Nicholls	9	Extended content: (bronze) 2009 EuroBasket; (bronze) 2010 Women's World Cup; (gold) 2013 EuroBasket; (silver) 2014 Women's World Cup; (bronze) 2015 EuroBasket; (silver) 2016 Summer Olympics; (gold) 2017 EuroBasket; (bronze) 2018 Women's World Cup; (gold) 2019 EuroBasket
Anna Cruz	8	Extended content: (bronze) 2009 EuroBasket; (bronze) 2010 Women's World Cup; (silver) 2014 Women's World Cup; (bronze) 2015 EuroBasket; (silver) 2016 Summer Olympics; (gold) 2017 EuroBasket; (bronze) 2018 Women's World Cup; (gold) 2019 EuroBasket
Laura Gil	8	Extended content: (gold) 2013 EuroBasket; (silver) 2014 Women's World Cup; (bronze) 2015 EuroBasket; (silver) 2016 Summer Olympics; (gold) 2017 EuroBasket; (bronze) 2018 Women's World Cup; (gold) 2019 EuroBasket; (silver) 2023 EuroBasket
Lucila Pascua	8	Extended content: (bronze) 2003 EuroBasket; (bronze) 2005 EuroBasket; (silver) 2007 EuroBasket; (bronze) 2009 EuroBasket; (bronze) 2010 Women's World Cup; (silver) 2014 Women's World Cup; (bronze) 2015 EuroBasket; (silver) 2016 Summer Olympics

=== Head coaches ===
Timeline of head coaches with games and results in final tournaments at the EuroBasket, Women's World Cup and Olympics.
(*) Results through 17 November 2026.

Years	M	W	L	%	Name	Competition
1963–1971	8	3	5	.375	(Peru) Cholo Méndez	five friendlies, three qualifiers
1974–1978	50	20	30	.400	(Spain) Josep María Solà	12th 1974 EuroBasket; 10th 1976 EuroBasket; 11th 1978 EuroBasket
1979	3	1	2	.333	(Spain) Chema Buceta	three friendlies
1979–1984	54	24	30	.444	(Spain) María Planas	10th 1980 EuroBasket; 11th 1983 EuroBasket
1985–1992	177	91	86	.514	(Spain) Chema Buceta	10th 1985 EuroBasket; 6th 1987 EuroBasket; 5th 1992 Summer Olympics
1992–1998	98	65	33	.663	(Spain) Manolo Coloma	(gold) 1993 EuroBasket; 8th 1994 Women's World Cup; 9th 1995 EuroBasket; 5th 1997 EuroBasket; 5th 1998 Women's World Cup
1999–2004	79	66	13	.835	(Spain) Vicente Rodríguez	(bronze) 2001 EuroBasket; 5th 2002 Women's World Cup; (bronze) 2003 EuroBasket; 6th 2004 Summer Olympics
2005–2006	33	23	10	.697	(Spain) Domingo Díaz	(bronze) 2005 EuroBasket; 8th 2006 Women's World Cup
2007–2009	53	39	14	.736	(Spain) Evaristo Pérez	(silver) 2007 EuroBasket; 5th 2008 Summer Olympics; (bronze) 2009 EuroBasket
2010–2011	33	25	8	.758	(Spain) José Ignacio Hernández	(bronze) 2010 Women's World Cup; 9th 2011 EuroBasket
2015	2	2	0	1.000	(Spain) Víctor Lapeña^{A}	two qualifiers
2012–2021	152	127	25	.836	(Spain) Lucas Mondelo	(gold) 2013 EuroBasket; (silver) 2014 Women's World Cup; (bronze) 2015 EuroBasket; (silver) 2016 Summer Olympics; (gold) 2017 EuroBasket; (bronze) 2018 Women's World Cup; (gold) 2019 EuroBasket; 7th 2021 EuroBasket; 6th 2020 Summer Olympics
2021-	72	58	14	.806	(Spain) Miguel Méndez	(silver) 2023 EuroBasket; 5th 2024 Summer Olympics; (silver) 2025 EuroBasket; (bronze) 2026 Women's World Cup

^{^A} Assistant coach Víctor Lapeña was appointed as head coach for two 2017 EuroBasket qualifiers in November 2015

== Youth teams ==
	Europe U-20	World U-19	Europe U-18	World U-17	Europe U-16
2027	q	q	q		q
2026	Bronze medal		Gold medal	Silver medal	Gold medal
2025	Gold medal	Bronze medal	Gold medal		Gold medal
2024	Silver medal		Silver medal	Bronze medal	Bronze medal
2023	Bronze medal	Silver medal	Bronze medal		Silver medal
2022	Gold medal		Silver medal	Silver medal	Silver medal
2021		7th			
2019	5th	Bronze medal	5th		Bronze medal
2018	Gold medal		Silver medal	6th	Bronze medal
2017	Gold medal	8th	6th		5th
2016	Gold medal		Silver medal	6th	Gold medal
2015	Gold medal	4th	Gold medal		4th
2014	Silver medal		Bronze medal	Silver medal	Bronze medal
2013	Gold medal	4th	Gold medal		Gold medal
2012	Gold medal		5th	Silver medal	Gold medal
2011	Gold medal	Silver medal	Bronze medal		Gold medal
2010	Silver medal		Silver medal	8th	4th
2009	Silver medal	Silver medal	Gold medal		Gold medal
2008	4th		5th		Gold medal
2007	Gold medal	4th	Silver medal		Silver medal
2006	4th		Gold medal		Gold medal
2005	8th	5th	Silver medal		Gold medal
2004	9th		Silver medal		Gold medal
2003					4th
2002	5th		5th		
2001		DNQ			7th
2000	5th		6th		
1999					Gold medal
1998			Gold medal		
1997		8th			5th
1996			4th		
1995					4th
1994			Silver medal		
1993		DNQ			Silver medal
1992			5th		
1991					9th
1990			Silver medal		
1989		5th			4th
1988			6th		
1987					9th
1986			12th		
1985		7th			9th
1984			4th		7th
1983			8th		
1982					8th
1981			9th		
1980					10th
1979			DNQ		
1978					11th
1977			11th		
1976					10th
1975			6th		
1973			8th		
1965–71			DNQ		

== See also ==
- Spanish Basketball Federation
- Spain national basketball team
- Spain national youth basketball teams
