= EuroBasket Women 1993 =

Women's basketball championship held in 1993

EuroBasket 1993 Women
24th FIBA European Women's Basketball Championship

Tournament details
- Host country: Italy
- Dates: 8–13 June
- Teams: 8

Final positions
- Champions: Spain (1st title)

Official website
- Official website (archive)

The 1993 European Women Basketball Championship, commonly called EuroBasket Women 1993, was the 24th regional championship held by FIBA Europe. The competition was held in Italy and took place from 8 June to 13 June 1993. Spain won the gold medal and France the silver medal while Slovakia won the bronze.

== Qualification ==
=== Group A ===
Pl	Team	Pld	W	L	PF	PA
1	(Czech Republic) Czechoslovakia^{1}	5	5	0	426	330
2	Spain	5	3	2	357	319
3	Finland	5	3	2	391	410
4	Germany	5	2	3	359	382
5	Sweden	5	1	4	395	459
6	Israel	5	1	4	359	404

May 13 1992	Spain	94–79	Finland
May 13 1992	Czechoslovakia (Czech Republic)	83–57	Israel
May 13 1992	Germany	80–72	Sweden
May 14 1992	Spain	86–69	Israel
May 14 1992	Czechoslovakia (Czech Republic)	91–84	Sweden
May 14 1992	Finland	76–70	Germany
May 15 1992	Czechoslovakia (Czech Republic)	90–67	Finland
May 15 1992	Germany	95–83	Spain
May 15 1992	Sweden	93–89	Israel
May 16 1992	Spain	111–64	Sweden
May 16 1992	Czechoslovakia (Czech Republic)	81–53	Germany
May 16 1992	Finland	81–74	Israel
May 17 1992	Czechoslovakia (Czech Republic)	81–69	Spain
May 17 1992	Finland	88–82	Sweden
May 17 1992	Israel	70–61	Germany

=== Group B ===
Pl	Team	Pld	W	L	PF	PA
1	Italy	5	5	0	387	240
2	France	5	4	1	342	312
3	Netherlands	5	2	3	277	301
4	(Poland) Poland^{2}	5	2	3	359	382
5	Romania	5	1	4	314	369
6	Greece	5	1	4	316	378

May 13 1992	Romania	61–50	Poland
May 13 1992	Italy	95–59	Greece
May 13 1992	France	71–61	Netherlands
May 14 1992	Poland	63–62	Greece
May 14 1992	Italy	60–26	Netherlands
May 14 1992	France	76–66	Romania
May 15 1992	Italy	74–42	Poland
May 15 1992	Netherlands	65–64	Romania
May 15 1992	France	70–57	Greece
May 16 1992	Italy	88–54	Romania
May 16 1992	Netherlands	81–48	Greece
May 16 1992	France	66–58	Poland
May 17 1992	Greece	90–69	Romania
May 17 1992	Poland	58–44	Netherlands
May 17 1992	Italy	70–59	France

^{1} Following the dissolution of Czechoslovakia on 1 January 1993, the former Czechoslovak team was replaced by the new Slovak national team.
^{2} Poland was invited to the EuroBasket to replace FR Yugoslavia, which was disqualified in application of the United Nations Security Council Resolution 757.

== First stage ==
=== Group A ===
Pl	Team	Pld	W	L	PF	PA
1	Italy	3	3	0	212	189
2	Spain	3	2	1	224	204
3	Bulgaria	3	1	2	220	228
4	Poland	3	0	3	205	240

June 8	Spain	92–68	Poland
June 8	Italy	79–69	Bulgaria
June 9	Spain	76–70	Bulgaria
June 9	Italy	67–64	Poland
June 10	Bulgaria	81–73	Poland
June 10	Italy	66–56	Spain

=== Group B ===
Pl	Team	Pld	W	L	PF	PA
1	Slovakia	3	2	1	233	213
2	France	3	2	1	199	187
3	Hungary	3	1	2	235	241
4	(Russia) Russia^{3}	3	1	2	205	240

June 8	France	71–53	Russia
June 8	Slovakia	88–82	Hungary
June 9	Russia	80–75	Slovakia
June 9	France	77–64	Hungary
June 10	Hungary	89–76	Russia
June 10	Slovakia	70–51	France

^{3} Following the dissolution of the Soviet Union the former Soviet team, the defending champion, was replaced by the new Russian national team.

== Play-off stages ==
Semifinals
June 12
Italy	54
France	56
June 12
Slovakia	55
Spain	73

Final
June 13
France	53
Spain	63
Third place
June 13
Italy	67
Slovakia	68

5th to 8th places
June 12	Bulgaria	76–74	Russia
June 12	Poland	95–64	Hungary
7th place
June 13	Russia	103–83	Hungary
5th place
June 13	Poland	77–72	Bulgaria

1993 FIBA European Women's Basketball Championship champion

Spain
First title

== Final standings ==
Place	Team	PE
Gold medal	Spain	New entry
Silver medal	France	New entry
Bronze medal	Slovakia	▲2
4	Italy	▲3
5	Poland	▲1
6	Bulgaria	▼2
7	Russia	▼6
8	Hungary	▼5
