= 2026 FIBA Women's Basketball World Cup final round =

Final stage of the 2026 FIBA Women's Basketball World Cup

The final round of the 2026 FIBA Women's Basketball World Cup took place from 8 to 13 September 2026.

== Qualified teams ==
The group winners qualified for the quarterfinals while the runners-up and third placed teams advanced to the qualification round.

Group	Winners	Runners-up	Third place
A	Spain	Germany	Japan
B	France	Hungary	South Korea
C	Belgium	Australia	Puerto Rico
D	United States	China	Italy

== Bracket ==
Qualification round
9 September
Italy	80
Australia	82
8 September
Hungary	84
Japan	63
9 September
Puerto Rico	72
China	75
8 September
Germany	94
South Korea	56

Quarterfinals
10 September
Australia	66
Spain	89
10 September
United States	108
Hungary	56
10 September
China	61
France	90
10 September
Belgium	74
Germany	93

Semifinals
12 September
Spain	66
United States	76
12 September
France	86
Germany	64

Final
13 September
United States	97
France	79
Third place
13 September
Spain	81
Germany	58

== Qualification round ==
8 September 2026
17:45

Boxscore

Hungary	84–63	Japan
Scoring by quarter: 20–12, 17–22, 21–11, 26–18
Pts: Lelik 23; Rebs: Takács-Kiss, Lelik 8 Asts: Lelik, Studer 4		Pts: Tanaka 11; Rebs: Mawuli 8 Asts: Machida 12

Berlin Arena, Berlin
Attendance: 3,698
Referees: Ruben Woolcock (AUS), Waseem Hosainy (CAN), Paulina Gajdosz (POL)

8 September 2026
20:45

Boxscore

Germany	94–56	South Korea
Scoring by quarter: 23–14, 23–15, 22–11, 26–16
Pts: Gülich 19; Rebs: Fiebich 11; Asts: Sabally 6		Pts: Lee H. 21; Rebs: Park J. 6 Asts: Heo 8

Berlin Arena, Berlin
Attendance: 6,227
Referees: Ariadna Chueca (ESP), Johnny Batista (PUR), Julirys Guzmán (PUR)

9 September 2026
17:45

Boxscore

Puerto Rico	72–75	China
Scoring by quarter: 21–24, 19–17, 13–11, 19–23
Pts: San Antonio 24; Rebs: McGee-Stafford, San Antonio 9 Asts: San Antonio 7		Pts: Han 21; Rebs: Han 11; Asts: Yang 11

Berlin Arena, Berlin
Attendance: 3,511
Referees: Wojciech Liszka (POL), Carlos Peralta (ECU), James Griguol (AUS)

9 September 2026
20:45

Boxscore

Italy	80–82	Australia
Scoring by quarter: 13–26, 20–22, 16–21, 31–13
Pts: Verona 23; Rebs: Cubaj 8 Asts: Cubaj 5		Pts: Borlase 30; Rebs: Talbot 9 Asts: Wilson 8

Berlin Arena, Berlin
Attendance: 4,559
Referees: Yohan Rosso (FRA), Takaki Kato (JPN), Boris Krejić (SLO)

== Quarterfinals ==
10 September 2026
11:30

Boxscore

United States	108–56	Hungary
Scoring by quarter: 36–12, 23–18, 34–17, 15–9
Pts: Collier 19; Rebs: Collier 7 Asts: Clark 9		Pts: Lelik 12; Rebs: Juhasz 8 Asts: Juhasz 4

Berlin Arena, Berlin
Attendance: 5,303
Referees: Mihkel Männiste (EST), Waseem Husainy (CAN), Alan dos Santos (BRA)

10 September 2026
14:30

Boxscore

China	61–90	France
Scoring by quarter: 20–25, 11–23, 17–22, 13–20
Pts: Han 21; Rebs: Han 9 Asts: Yang 5		Pts: Johannès, Salaün 15; Rebs: Malonga 9 Asts: Johannès 7

Berlin Arena, Berlin
Attendance: 5,788
Referees: Johnny Batista (PUR), Ariadna Chueca (ESP), Paulina Gajdosz (POL)

10 September 2026
17:45

Boxscore

Belgium	74–93	Germany
Scoring by quarter: 19–22, 16–20, 24–32, 15–19
Pts: Meesseman 29; Rebs: Linskens 10; Asts: Allemand 7		Pts: Fiebich 17; Rebs: Sabally 12; Asts: Peterson 6

Berlin Arena, Berlin
Attendance: 10,537
Referees: Julio Anaya (PAN), Blanca Burns (USA), Ruben Woolcock (AUS)

10 September 2026
20:45

Boxscore

Australia	66–89	Spain
Scoring by quarter: 17–31, 20–27, 14–12, 15–19
Pts: Bibby, Wilson 13; Rebs: Talbot 11; Asts: Talbot 7		Pts: Gustafson 16; Rebs: Fam 8 Asts: Cazorla 5

Berlin Arena, Berlin
Attendance: 8,619
Referees: Wojciech Liszka (POL), Gatis Saliņš (LAT), Martin Vulić (CRO)

== Semifinals ==
12 September 2026
16:30

Boxscore

France	86–64	Germany
Scoring by quarter: 25–23, 20–15, 19–12, 22–14
Pts: Williams 22; Rebs: Salaün 11; Asts: Williams 5		Pts: Gülich, Sabally 12; Rebs: Gülich 10; Asts: Fiebich 4

Berlin Arena, Berlin
Attendance: 12,650
Referees: Wojciech Liszka (POL), Gatis Saliņš (LAT), James Griguol (AUS)

12 September 2026
20:00

Boxscore

Spain	66–76	United States
Scoring by quarter: 18–21, 18–18, 22–19, 8–18
Pts: Conde, Martín 17; Rebs: Fam 7 Asts: Cazorla 5		Pts: Stewart 16; Rebs: Boston 7 Asts: Young 4

Berlin Arena, Berlin
Attendance: 12,650
Referees: Julio Anaya (PAN), Takaki Kato (JPN), Ruben Woolcock (AUS)

== Third place game ==
13 September 2026
16:30

Boxscore

Spain	81–58	Germany
Scoring by quarter: 25–15, 15–21, 21–15, 20–7
Pts: Martín 22; Rebs: Fam 9 Asts: Martín 9		Pts: Peterson, Sabally 13; Rebs: Fiebich 7 Asts: Gülich 3

Berlin Arena, Berlin
Attendance: 12,187
Referees: Yohan Rosso (FRA), Julirys Guzmán (PUR), Blanca Burns (USA)

== Final ==
13 September 2026
20:00

Boxscore

United States	97–79	France
Scoring by quarter: 17–20, 26–25, 30–12, 24–22
Pts: Stewart 22; Rebs: Stewart 10; Asts: Gray, Young 5		Pts: Malonga 21; Rebs: Malonga 6 Asts: Williams 7

Berlin Arena, Berlin
Attendance: 12,233
Referees: Julio Anaya (PAN), Ariadna Chueca (ESP), Gatis Saliņš (LAT)
