= 2026 FIBA Women's Basketball World Cup Group A =

Basketball tournament group stage

Group A of the 2026 FIBA Women's Basketball World Cup took place from 4 to 7 September 2026. The group consisted of Japan, Spain, Germany, and Mali.

The top team advanced to the quarterfinals, while the second and third placed team played in a qualification round.

== Teams ==
Team	Qualification		Appearance			Best Performance	FIBA World Ranking (As of start of the tournament)	FIBA Zone Ranking
Team	Method	Date	Last	Total	Streak	Best Performance	FIBA World Ranking (As of start of the tournament)	FIBA Zone Ranking
Germany	Host nation	28 April 2023	1998	2	1	Eleventh place (1998)	11	4
Spain	Qualifying Tournament	14 March 2026	2018	8	1	Runners-up (2014)	6	3
Japan	Qualifying Tournament	17 March 2026	2022	10	5	Runners-up (1975)	10	3
Mali	Qualifying Tournament	17 March 2026	2022	3	2	Eleventh place (2022)	18	2

== Standings ==
Pos	Team	Pld	W	L	PF	PA	PD	Pts	Qualification
1	Spain	3	2	1	235	194	+41	5 (Note: Spain 83–53 Germany)	Quarterfinals
2	Germany (H)	3	2	1	210	199	+11	5	Qualification to quarterfinals
3	Japan	3	1	2	219	250	−31	4 (Note: Japan 102–97 Mali)	Qualification to quarterfinals
4	Mali	3	1	2	237	258	−21	4	

Source: FIBA
Rules for classification: 1) Points; 2) Head-to-head results; 3) Points difference; 4) Points scored.
(H) Hosts

== Games ==
All times are local (UTC+2).

=== Japan vs Mali ===
4 September 2026
11:30

Boxscore

Japan	102–97	Mali
Scoring by quarter: 21–25, 27–27, 23–21, 31–24
Pts: Hayashi 27; Rebs: Konno 4 Asts: Tanaka 7		Pts: Sangaré, N'Diaye 22; Rebs: Koné 11; Asts: N'Diaye 6

Berlin Arena, Berlin
Attendance: 2,599
Referees: Yohan Rosso (FRA), Viola Györgyi (NOR), Çisil Güngör (TUR)

=== Spain vs Germany ===
4 September 2026
17:45

Boxscore

Spain	83–53	Germany
Scoring by quarter: 24–13, 26–11, 15–15, 18–14
Pts: Fam 17; Rebs: Carrera 10; Asts: Flórez 5		Pts: Fiebich 13; Rebs: Sabally 7 Asts: Geiselsöder, Wilke 2

Berlin Arena, Berlin
Attendance: 12,550
Referees: Johnny Batista (PUR), Martin Vulić (CRO), Waseem Husainy (CAN)

=== Mali vs Spain ===
5 September 2026
11:30

Boxscore

Mali	82–73	Spain
Scoring by quarter: 19–17, 13–17, 31–19, 19–20
Pts: Koné, N'Diaye 19; Rebs: Koné 10; Asts: Doumbia 9		Pts: Martín 20; Rebs: Carrera 7 Asts: Martín 4

Max-Schmeling-Halle, Berlin
Attendance: 3,523
Referees: Ruben Woolcock (AUS), Waseem Husainy (CAN), Yann Davidson (MAD)

=== Germany vs Japan ===
5 September 2026
18:00

Boxscore

Germany	74–58	Japan
Scoring by quarter: 28–11, 6–18, 24–10, 16–19
Pts: Bühner 19; Rebs: Fiebich, Sabally 9 Asts: Fiebich 7		Pts: Tanaka 15; Rebs: Mawuli, Todo 6 Asts: Machida, Yamamoto 2

Max-Schmeling-Halle, Berlin
Attendance: 8,367
Referees: Julirys Guzmán (PUR), Petar Pešić (SRB), Maripier Malo (CAN)

=== Japan vs Spain ===
7 September 2026
17:50

Boxscore

Japan	59–79	Spain
Scoring by quarter: 15–23, 21–16, 12–18, 11–22
Pts: Tanaka 15; Rebs: Miyazawa 8 Asts: Machida 4		Pts: Martín 20; Rebs: Fam 10; Asts: Cazorla 5

Max-Schmeling-Halle, Berlin
Attendance: 2,717
Referees: Johnny Batista (PUR), Julirys Guzmán (PUR), Blanca Burns (USA)

=== Germany vs Mali ===
7 September 2026
17:50

Boxscore

Germany	83–58	Mali
Scoring by quarter: 23–18, 26–14, 15–12, 19–14
Pts: Bühner 21; Rebs: Fiebich 9 Asts: Fiebich 6		Pts: four players 10; Rebs: Koné 10; Asts: Doumbia 5

Berlin Arena, Berlin
Attendance: 12,550
Referees: Ruben Woolcock (AUS), Paulina Gajdosz (POL), James Griguol (AUS)
