= 2026 FIBA Women's Basketball World Cup final =

United States	France
(United States)	(France)
97	79
	1	2	3	4	Total
United States	17	26	30	24	97
France	20	25	12	22	79
- Date: 13 September 2026
- Venue: Berlin Arena, Berlin
- Referees: Julio Anaya (PAN); Ariadna Chueca (ESP); Gatis Saliņš (LAT)
- Attendance: 12,233

The 2026 FIBA Women's Basketball World Cup Final was a basketball game that took place on 13 September 2026 at the Berlin Arena in Berlin, Germany, to determine the winner of the 2026 FIBA Women's Basketball World Cup.

The United States retained the title after a win over France.

== Road to the final ==
United States
Round
France
Opponent
Result
Group stage
Opponent
Result
China
94–61
Match 1
Hungary
99–53
Italy
55–52
Match 2
South Korea
95–69
Czech Republic
105–64
Match 3
Nigeria
111–56

Pos	Team	Pld	Pts
1	United States	3	6
2	China	3	5
3	Italy	3	4
4	Czech Republic	3	3

Source: FIBA
Final standing

Pos	Team	Pld	Pts
1	France	3	6
2	Hungary	3	5
3	South Korea	3	4
4	Nigeria	3	3

Source: FIBA
Opponent
Result
Knockout stage
Opponent
Result
Hungary
108–56
Quarter-finals
China
90–61
Spain
76–66
Semifinals
Germany
86–64

== Match details ==
13 September 2026
20:00

Report

United States	97–79	France
Scoring by quarter: 17–20, 26–25, 30–12, 24–22
Pts: Stewart 22; Rebs: Stewart 10; Asts: Gray, Young 5		Pts: Malonga 21; Rebs: Malonga 6 Asts: Williams 7

Berlin Arena, Berlin
Attendance: 12,233
Referees: Julio Anaya (PAN), Ariadna Chueca (ESP), Gatis Saliņš (LAT)

Starters:			Pts	Reb	Ast
G	7	Kahleah Copper	15	1	1
G	8	Chelsea Gray	12	4	5
G	13	Jackie Young	18	6	5
SF	11	Napheesa Collier	6	7	1
PF	10	Breanna Stewart	22	10	4
Reserves:					
G	4	Paige Bueckers	0	1	0
G	5	Sonia Citron	0	1	1
G	6	Rhyne Howard	2	0	0
G	12	Caitlin Clark	12	1	3
F	9	Kiki Iriafen	0	0	0
F	14	Aliyah Boston	7	1	1
F	15	Angel Reese	3	3	0
Head coach:
(USA Basketball) Kara Lawson

United States	France

United States	Statistics	France
28/45 (62%)	2-pt field goals	15/30 (50%)
8/19 (42%)	3-pt field goals	11/24 (46%)
17/25 (68%)	Free throws	16/25 (64%)
12	Offensive rebounds	6
26	Defensive rebounds	19
38	Total rebounds	25
21	Assists	15
15	Turnovers	16
7	Steals	5
2	Blocks	0
23	Fouls	21

2026 World Champions

United States
(12th title)

Starters:			Pts	Reb	Ast
G	71	Leïla Lacan	2	0	2
SF	11	Valériane Ayayi	8	2	0
F	13	Janelle Salaün	7	4	1
F	15	Gabby Williams	20	3	7
C	22	Marième Badiane	7	1	0
Reserves:					
PG	0	Carla Leite	5	1	1
PG	47	Romane Bernies	0	0	0
SG	23	Marine Johannès	5	2	3
SG	28	Mamignan Touré	3	0	0
G	98	Pauline Astier	1	1	1
C	14	Dominique Malonga	21	6	0
C	31	Aminata Gueye	0	1	0
Head coach:
(French Federation of Basketball) Jean-Aimé Toupane
