= 2026 FIBA Women's Basketball World Cup Group B =

Basketball tournament group stage

Group B of the 2026 FIBA Women's Basketball World Cup took place from 4 to 7 September 2026. The group consisted of Hungary, South Korea, Nigeria, and France.

The top team advanced to the quarterfinals, while the second and third placed team played in a qualification round.

== Teams ==
Team	Qualification		Appearance			Best Performance	FIBA World Ranking (As of start of the tournament)	FIBA Zone Ranking
Team	Method	Date	Last	Total	Streak	Best Performance	FIBA World Ranking (As of start of the tournament)	FIBA Zone Ranking
Hungary	Qualifying Tournament	17 March 2026	1998	6	1	Fifth place (1957)	19	9
South Korea	Qualifying Tournament	15 March 2026	2022	17	17	Runners-up (1967, 1979)	15	4
France	Qualifying Tournament	14 March 2026	2022	12	7	Third place (1953)	2	1
Nigeria	2025 Women's Afrobasket champions	3 August 2025	2018	3	1	Eighth place (2018)	8	1

== Standings ==
Pos	Team	Pld	W	L	PF	PA	PD	Pts	Qualification
1	France	3	3	0	305	178	+127	6	Quarterfinals
2	Hungary	3	2	1	206	239	−33	5	Qualification to quarterfinals
3	South Korea	3	1	2	241	258	−17	4	Qualification to quarterfinals
4	Nigeria	3	0	3	204	281	−77	3	

Source: FIBA
Rules for classification: 1) Points; 2) Head-to-head results; 3) Points difference; 4) Points scored.

== Games ==
All times are local (UTC+2).

=== South Korea vs Nigeria ===
4 September 2026
14:15

Boxscore

South Korea	99–81	Nigeria
Scoring by quarter: 26–22, 22–23, 20–17, 31–19
Pts: Park J. 27; Rebs: Park J. 6 Asts: An 8		Pts: Okonkwo 22; Rebs: Musa 13; Asts: Kalu 5

Berlin Arena, Berlin
Attendance: 2,599
Referees: Boris Krejić (SLO), Maripier Malo (CAN), Martin Davison (NZL)

=== Hungary vs France ===
4 September 2026
21:00

Boxscore

Hungary	53–99	France
Scoring by quarter: 11–29, 9–32, 11–16, 22–22
Pts: Juhász 10; Rebs: Juhász 10; Asts: Studer 3		Pts: three players 17; Rebs: Malonga 10; Asts: Astier, Lacan 4

Berlin Arena, Berlin
Attendance: 9,728
Referees: Julio Anaya (PAN), Julirys Guzmán (PUR), Sun Jian (CHN)

=== Nigeria vs Hungary ===
5 September 2026
14:15

Boxscore

Nigeria	67–71	Hungary
Scoring by quarter: 13–21, 13–15, 16–16, 25–19
Pts: Okonkwo 17; Rebs: Okonkwo 6 Asts: Kalu 9		Pts: Juhász 19; Rebs: Juhász 16; Asts: Studer 5

Max-Schmeling-Halle, Berlin
Attendance: 3,857
Referees: Johnny Batista (PUR), James Griguol (AUS), Paulina Gajdosz (POL)

=== France vs South Korea ===
5 September 2026
20:45

Boxscore

France	95–69	South Korea
Scoring by quarter: 24–31, 19–6, 33–17, 19–17
Pts: Johannès 17; Rebs: Ayayi 8 Asts: Ayayi, Lacan 5		Pts: Heo, Lee H. 12; Rebs: Jin 5 Asts: Heo 5

Max-Schmeling-Halle, Berlin
Attendance: 6,951
Referees: Gatis Saliņš (LAT), Blanca Burns (USA), Ventsislav Velikov (BUL)

=== Hungary vs South Korea ===
7 September 2026
14:30

Boxscore

Hungary	82–73	South Korea
Scoring by quarter: 20–16, 20–20, 18–20, 24–17
Pts: Juhász 22; Rebs: Juhász 11; Asts: Studer 8		Pts: Park J. 21; Rebs: Choi 5 Asts: Heo, Park J. 4

Max-Schmeling-Halle, Berlin
Attendance: 1,503
Referees: Wojciech Liszka (POL), Sun Jian (CHN), Çisil Güngör (TUR)

=== Nigeria vs France ===
7 September 2026
14:30

Boxscore

Nigeria	56–111	France
Scoring by quarter: 13–31, 13–34, 13–30, 17–16
Pts: Efosa-Aguebor 15; Rebs: Igbokwe 9 Asts: Okonkwo 3		Pts: Williams 25; Rebs: Williams 6 Asts: four players 4

Berlin Arena, Berlin
Attendance: 3,567
Referees: Carlos Peralta (ECU), Viola Györgyi (NOR), Aline García (URU)
