= 2026 FIBA Women's Basketball World Cup Group D =

Basketball tournament group stage

Group D of the 2026 FIBA Women's Basketball World Cup took place from 4 to 7 September 2026. The group consisted of the United States, Czech Republic, Italy, and China.

The top team advanced to the quarterfinals, while the second and third placed team played in a qualification round.

== Teams ==
| Team | Qualification | | Appearance | | | Best Performance | FIBA World Ranking (As of start of the tournament) | FIBA Zone Ranking |
| Team | Method | Date | Last | Total | Streak | Best Performance | FIBA World Ranking (As of start of the tournament) | FIBA Zone Ranking |
|---|---|---|---|---|---|---|---|---|
| United States | 2025 Women's AmeriCup champions | 6 July 2025 | 2022 | 19 | 17 | Champions (1953, 1957, 1979, 1986, 1990, 1998, 2002, 2010, 2014, 2018, 2022) | 1 | 1 |
| Czech Republic | Qualifying Tournament | 17 March 2026 | 2014 | 3 | 1 | Runners-up (2014) | 17 | 8 |
| Italy | Qualifying Tournament | 15 March 2026 | 1994 | 6 | 1 | Fourth place (1975) | 14 | 6 |
| China | Qualifying Tournament | 15 March 2026 | 2022 | 12 | 12 | Runners-up (1994, 2022) | 4 | 2 |

== Standings ==
| Pos | Team | Pld | W | L | PF | PA | PD | Pts | Qualification |
|---|---|---|---|---|---|---|---|---|---|
| 1 | United States | 3 | 3 | 0 | 254 | 177 | +77 | 6 | Quarterfinals |
| 2 | China | 3 | 2 | 1 | 206 | 215 | −9 | 5 | Qualification to quarterfinals |
| 3 | Italy | 3 | 1 | 2 | 166 | 180 | −14 | 4 | Qualification to quarterfinals |
| 4 | Czech Republic | 3 | 0 | 3 | 188 | 242 | −54 | 3 | |

Source: FIBA
Rules for classification: 1) Points; 2) Head-to-head results; 3) Points difference; 4) Points scored.

== Games ==
All times are local (UTC+2).

=== United States vs China ===
4 September 2026
14:15

Boxscore

| United States | 94–61 | China |
Scoring by quarter: 27–14, 22–15, 21–13, 24–19
| Pts: three players 14; Rebs: Reese 9 Asts: Clark 11 | | Pts: Luo, Zhang Z. 13; Rebs: Han 10; Asts: four players 3 |

Max-Schmeling-Halle, Berlin
Attendance: 4,801
Referees: Ariadna Chueca (ESP), Ruben Woolcock (AUS), Mihkel Männiste (EST)

=== Czech Republic vs Italy ===
4 September 2026
20:15

Boxscore

| Czech Republic | 54–63 | Italy |
Scoring by quarter: 17–14, 15–17, 13–19, 9–13
| Pts: Pospíšilová 21; Rebs: Joklová 10; Asts: Voráčková 4 | | Pts: Zandalasini 19; Rebs: Cubaj 9 Asts: Verona, Zandalasini 3 |

Max-Schmeling-Halle, Berlin
Attendance: 4,520
Referees: Takaki Kato (JPN), Blanca Burns (USA), Gatis Saliņš (LAT)

=== China vs Czech Republic ===
6 September 2026
14:30

Boxscore

| China | 74–70 (OT) | Czech Republic |
Scoring by quarter: 17−22, 16−19, 15−12, 16−11, Overtime: 10−6
| Pts: Han 22; Rebs: Han 14; Asts: Yang S. 5 | | Pts: Joklová 18; Rebs: Voráčková 7 Asts: Joklová 4 |

Berlin Arena, Berlin
Attendance: 5,193
Referees: Wojciech Liszka (POL), Viola Györgyi (NOR), Alan dos Santos (BRA)

=== Italy vs United States ===
6 September 2026
20:45

Boxscore

| Italy | 52–55 | United States |
Scoring by quarter: 8–19, 16–11, 15–12, 13–13
| Pts: Zandalasini 14; Rebs: Cubaj 9 Asts: Cubaj, Verona 3 | | Pts: Young 10; Rebs: Stewart 11; Asts: Young 3 |

Berlin Arena, Berlin
Attendance: 9,232
Referees: Julio Anaya (PAN), Martin Vulić (CRO), Çisil Güngör (TUR)

=== United States vs Czech Republic ===
7 September 2026
20:45

Boxscore

| United States | 105–64 | Czech Republic |
Scoring by quarter: 29–15, 28–18, 25–14, 23–17
| Pts: Stewart 19; Rebs: Iriafen 11; Asts: Clark 7 | | Pts: Joklová 19; Rebs: Voráčková 9 Asts: Voráčková, Zeithammerová 3 |

Berlin Arena, Berlin
Attendance: 11,693
Referees: Ariadna Chueca (ESP), Takaki Kato (JPN), Yann Davidson (MAD)

=== Italy vs China ===
7 September 2026
20:45

Boxscore

| Italy | 51–71 | China |
Scoring by quarter: 7–23, 14–17, 21–15, 9–16
| Pts: Villa 15; Rebs: Keys 6 Asts: Zandalasini 4 | | Pts: Han 19; Rebs: Han 10; Asts: Wang 6 |

Max-Schmeling-Halle, Berlin
Attendance: 3,120
Referees: Yohan Rosso (FRA), Petar Pešić (SRB), Mihkel Männiste (EST)
