= 2026 FIBA Women's Basketball World Cup Group C =

Basketball tournament group stage

Group C of the 2026 FIBA Women's Basketball World Cup took place from 4 to 7 September 2026. The group consisted of Belgium, Australia, Puerto Rico, and Turkey.

The top team advanced to the quarterfinals, while the second and third placed team played in a qualification round.

== Teams ==
| Team | Qualification | | Appearance | | | Best Performance | FIBA World Ranking (As of start of the tournament) | FIBA Zone Ranking |
| Team | Method | Date | Last | Total | Streak | Best Performance | FIBA World Ranking (As of start of the tournament) | FIBA Zone Ranking |
|---|---|---|---|---|---|---|---|---|
| Belgium | EuroBasket Women 2025 champions | 29 June 2025 | 2022 | 3 | 3 | Fourth place (2018) | 5 | 2 |
| Australia | 2025 Women's Asia Cup champions | 20 July 2025 | 2022 | 17 | 16 | Champions (2006) | 3 | 1 |
| Puerto Rico | Qualifying Tournament | 17 March 2026 | 2022 | 3 | 3 | Eighth place (2022) | 13 | 4 |
| Turkey | Qualifying Tournament | 17 March 2026 | 2018 | 3 | 1 | Fourth place (2014) | 16 | 7 |

== Standings ==
| Pos | Team | Pld | W | L | PF | PA | PD | Pts | Qualification |
|---|---|---|---|---|---|---|---|---|---|
| 1 | Belgium | 3 | 3 | 0 | 245 | 207 | +38 | 6 | Quarterfinals |
| 2 | Australia | 3 | 2 | 1 | 225 | 205 | +20 | 5 | Qualification to quarterfinals |
| 3 | Puerto Rico | 3 | 1 | 2 | 193 | 217 | −24 | 4 | Qualification to quarterfinals |
| 4 | Turkey | 3 | 0 | 3 | 217 | 251 | −34 | 3 | |

Source: FIBA
Rules for classification: 1) Points; 2) Head-to-head results; 3) Points difference; 4) Points scored.

== Games ==
All times are local (UTC+2).

=== Australia vs Puerto Rico ===
4 September 2026
11:30

Boxscore

| Australia | 70–54 | Puerto Rico |
Scoring by quarter: 19–11, 12–13, 20–14, 19–16
| Pts: Talbot 19; Rebs: Aokuso, Magbegor 9 Asts: Wilson 4 | | Pts: Guirantes 14; Rebs: McGee-Stafford 12; Asts: San Antonio 2 |

Max-Schmeling-Halle, Berlin
Attendance: 4,801
Referees: Carlos Peralta (ECU), Paulina Gajdosz (POL), Aline García (URU)

=== Belgium vs Turkey ===
4 September 2026
17:30

Boxscore

| Belgium | 89–75 | Turkey |
Scoring by quarter: 26–24, 18–21, 27–9, 18–21
| Pts: Meesseman 27; Rebs: Meesseman 9 Asts: Allemand 9 | | Pts: Burke 17; Rebs: Çakır 9 Asts: Uzun 11 |

Max-Schmeling-Halle, Berlin
Attendance: 4,752
Referees: Wojciech Liszka (POL), Alan dos Santos (BRA), Orlando Varela (HON)

=== Turkey vs Australia ===
6 September 2026
11:30

Boxscore

| Turkey | 71–87 | Australia |
Scoring by quarter: 15–21, 15–19, 25–27, 16–20
| Pts: Uzun 24; Rebs: Bayram 5 Asts: Uzun 6 | | Pts: Magbegor 21; Rebs: Borlase, Talbot 5 Asts: Talbot 5 |

Berlin Arena, Berlin
Attendance: 5,317
Referees: Yohan Rosso (FRA), Takaki Kato (JPN), Mihkel Männiste (EST)

=== Puerto Rico vs Belgium ===
6 September 2026
17:45

Boxscore

| Puerto Rico | 64–76 | Belgium |
Scoring by quarter: 13–20, 19–20, 18–18, 14–18
| Pts: McGee-Stafford 25; Rebs: McGee-Stafford 13; Asts: San Antonio 7 | | Pts: Lisowa-Mbaka 16; Rebs: Allemand 10; Asts: Allemand 8 |

Berlin Arena, Berlin
Attendance: 6,934
Referees: Ariadna Chueca (ESP), Carlos Peralta (ECU), Martin Davison (NZL)

=== Belgium vs Australia ===
7 September 2026
11:30

Boxscore

| Belgium | 80–68 | Australia |
Scoring by quarter: 23–17, 17–16, 20–22, 20–13
| Pts: Meesseman 22; Rebs: Linskens, Meesseman 10; Asts: Meesseman 8 | | Pts: Magbegor 15; Rebs: Talbot 10; Asts: Melbourne 6 |

Berlin Arena, Berlin
Attendance: 3,755
Referees: Gatis Saliņš (LAT), Waseem Husainy (CAN), Martin Vulić (CRO)

=== Puerto Rico vs Turkey ===
7 September 2026
11:30

Boxscore

| Puerto Rico | 75–71 | Turkey |
Scoring by quarter: 19–20, 18–20, 14–18, 24–13
| Pts: Guirantes 21; Rebs: McGee-Stafford 14; Asts: Guirantes, Rosado 5 | | Pts: Uzun 18; Rebs: Bayram 12; Asts: Uzun 8 |

Max-Schmeling-Halle, Berlin
Attendance: 1,413
Referees: Julio Anaya (PAN), Boris Krejić (SLO), Alan dos Santos (BRA)
