= 2026 FIBA Women's Basketball World Cup =

International basketball competition

Basketball-Weltmeisterschaft der Frauen 2026
- #WeOwnTheGame!

Tournament details
- Host country: Germany
- City: Berlin
- Dates: 4–13 September
- Teams: 16 (from 4 confederations)
- Venues: 2 (in 1 host city)

Final positions
- Champions: United States (12th title)
- Runners-up: France
- Third place: Spain
- Fourth place: Germany

Tournament statistics
- Games played: 36
- Attendance: 234,004 (6,500 per game)
- MVP: (United States) Breanna Stewart
- Top scorer: (Belgium) Emma Meesseman (21.0 ppg)

The 2026 FIBA Women's Basketball World Cup was the 20th edition of the FIBA Women's Basketball World Cup, the quadrennial world championship for women's national basketball teams, sanctioned by FIBA. The tournament was hosted in Berlin, Germany, from 4 to 13 September 2026. This was Germany's second time hosting after previously organising the event in 1998, after being awarded the hosting rights in spring 2023.

Sixteen teams took part in the tournament, four more than the previous edition but returning to the same number as was between 1990 and 2018. The hosts automatically qualified. Qualifiers were decided via a mixture of continental champions and teams progressing from the qualifying tournaments. Hungary and Italy returned after long absences.

The United States were the four-time defending champion and retained the fifth consecutive and 12th overall title, after a finals win over France. It also represented the second final between those teams at an international event since the 2024 Summer Olympics gold medal match.

== Host selection ==
The following countries expressed interest in hosting:

- Argentina (San Luis) – During the 2022 South American Basketball Championship, Horacio Muratore, president of the Argentine Basketball Confederation, explained that the federation is working really hard to win the hosting rights, with San Luis as the host city. This would be have been Argentina's first time hosting.
- Brazil (Rio de Janeiro) – After Rio de Janeiro carried out a study, they stated they want the Women's Basketball World Cup. This would have been Brazil's fourth time hosting after 1971, 1983 and 2006.
- Germany (Berlin) – After hosting EuroBasket 2022, German Basketball Federation president, Ingo Weiss stated he would like to consider hosting the 2026 Women's World Cup. This would be their second time organising after 1998.

During its Central Board meeting in Manila, Philippines, on 28 April 2023, FIBA announced that Germany would host the upcoming World Cup in 2026. It was the second Women's World Cup to be held in the Germany after the 1998 tournament.

== Qualified teams ==
Team qualified Team participated in the Qualifying Tournaments but failed to qualify Team failed to qualify Team suspended Did not enter

=== Expansion ===
On 25 March 2022, following a review of the current FIBA women's basketball system, FIBA expanded the World Cup back to 16 teams after reducing the teams to 12 teams in 2022. The expansion brought the numbers of teams that qualified back to the same count as the World Cups between 1990 and 2018.

=== Qualification ===
Germany as the hosts automatically qualified for the tournament in April 2023. Each winner of the continental championship qualified. All other teams played in a qualifying tournament after finishing as the top teams during their regional tournament. A total of 24 teams played in those qualifying tournaments for the remaining eleven spots.

=== Qualified teams ===
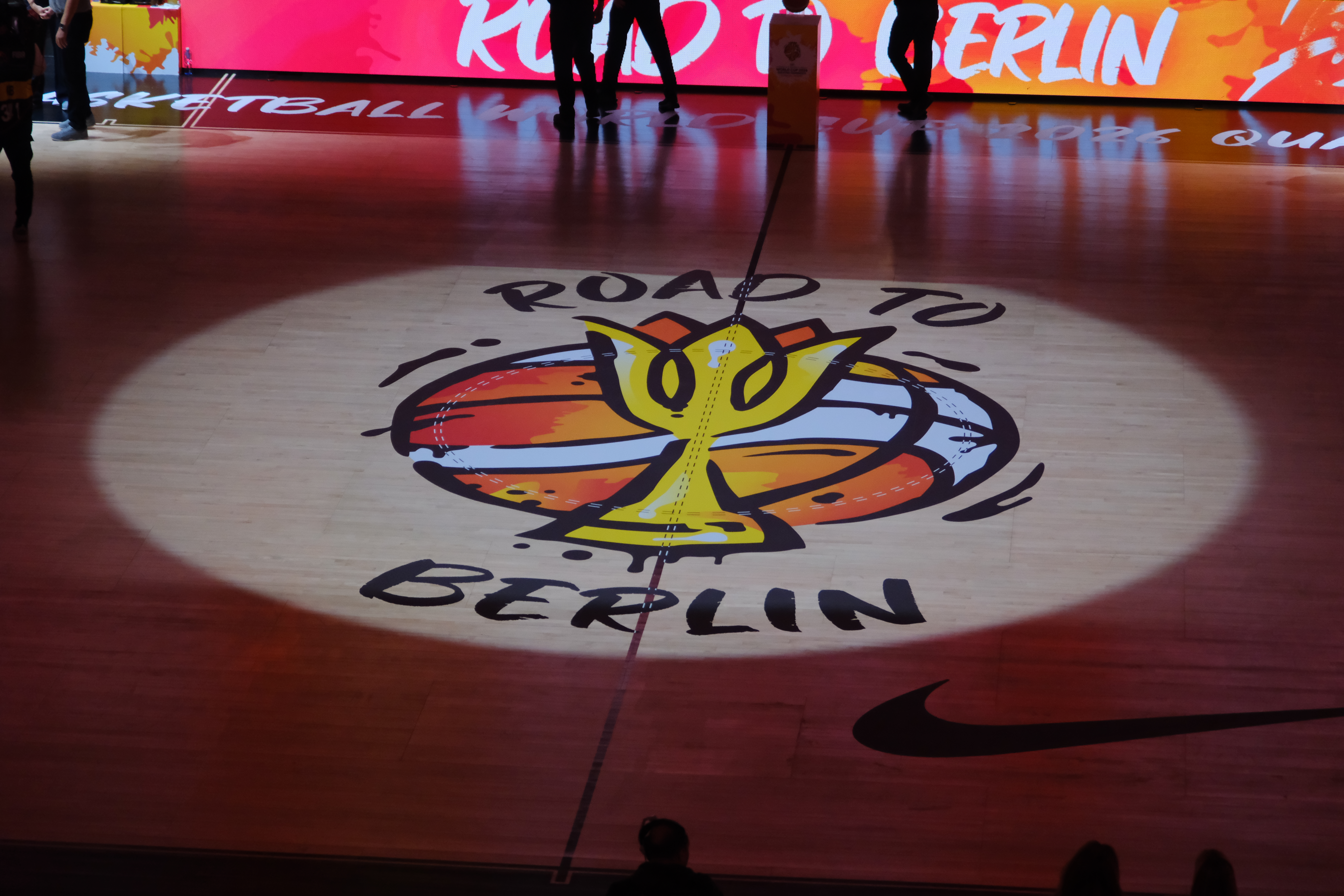
2026 FIBA Women's Basketball World Cup Qualifying Tournaments played in China, France, Puerto Rico and Turkey

Of the sixteen teams who qualified, nine took part in the previous edition. For the first time since 1990, no teams debuted at this edition. Of the seven returnees, Italy and Hungary came after long absences after last appearing in 1994 and 1998 respectively. Hosts Germany also returned after their only appearance was hosting in 1998. Czech Republic made an appearance after missing out on the previous two editions. Spain and Turkey progressed this time round after failing to advance in 2022, while Nigeria took part after withdrawing in 2022.

Of the absentees, the most notable absentee is 2022 fourth place finishers Canada, who failed to qualify for the first time since 2002 after missing out on a three way tie in the Qualifying Tournaments. 2022 debutants, Bosnia and Herzegovina, alongside Serbia, couldn't qualify after their sporadic appearances in 2022.

After the Qualifying Tournaments, the regional team split as follows: eight from Europe, four from Asia and Oceania and two from Africa and Americas. Europe's eight teams breaks their record of most European teams at a single World Cup (previously held by 1957 with seven); while on the other hand, Americas' two representatives (Puerto Rico and United States) marks the lowest number of teams at the World Cup from the region since 1967 (in which only 11 teams competed).

Mali qualified for a second successive edition for the first time, while Belgium and Puerto Rico continue their qualification streaks since their debuts in 2018. South Korea and the United States continue their longest active qualification streaks with 18 and 17 respectively.

The highest ranked team to not qualify was Canada, ranked 7th, while the lowest ranked team to qualify was Hungary, ranked 19th.

Qualification	Host	Dates	Vacancies	Qualified
Host nation	N/A	28 April 2023	1	Germany
Winner of EuroBasket Women 2025	(Czech Republic) Brno / (Germany) Hamburg (Greece) Piraeus / (Italy) Bologna	18–29 June 2025	1	Belgium
Winner of 2025 Women's AmeriCup	(Chile) Santiago	28 June – 6 July 2025	1	United States
Winner of 2025 Women's Asia Cup	(China) Shenzhen	13–20 July 2025	1	Australia
Winner of 2025 Women's Afrobasket	(Ivory Coast) Abidjan	26 July – 3 August 2025	1	Nigeria
Qualifying Tournaments	(China) Wuhan	11–17 March 2026	3	China; Mali; Czech Republic
Qualifying Tournaments	(Puerto Rico) San Juan	11–17 March 2026	3	Italy; Spain; Puerto Rico
Qualifying Tournaments	(Turkey) Istanbul	11–17 March 2026	3	Hungary; Turkey; Japan
Qualifying Tournaments	(France) Lyon	11–17 March 2026	2	France; South Korea

=== Summary of qualified teams ===
Team	Qualification method	Date of qualification	Appearance(s)				Previous best performance (Note: Bold text indicates they hosted that edition.)	WR (Note: World ranking at start of tournament.)
Team	Qualification method	Date of qualification	Total	First	Last	Streak	Previous best performance	WR
Germany	Host nation	28 April 2023	2nd	1998		1	Eleventh place (1998)	11
Belgium	Winner of EuroBasket Women 2025	29 June 2025	3rd	2018	2022	3	Fourth place (2018)	5
United States	Winner of 2025 Women's AmeriCup	6 July 2025	19th	1953	2022	17	Champions (Eleven times) (Note: United States have won in 1953, 1957, 1979, 1986, 1990, 1998, 2002, 2010, 2014, 2018 and 2022.)	1
Australia	Winner of 2025 Women's Asia Cup	20 July 2025	17th	1957	2022	16	Champions (2006)	3
Nigeria	Winner of 2025 Women's Afrobasket	3 August 2025	3rd	2006	2018	1	Eighth place (2018)	8
France	Qualified through Qualifying Tournaments	14 March 2026	12th	1953	2022	7	Third place (1953)	2
Spain	Qualified through Qualifying Tournaments	14 March 2026	8th	1994	2018	1	Runners-up (2014)	6
China	Qualified through Qualifying Tournaments	15 March 2026	12th	1983	2022	12	Runners-up (1994, 2022)	4
South Korea	Qualified through Qualifying Tournaments	15 March 2026	18th	1959	2022	18	Runners-up (1967, 1979)	15
Italy	Qualified through Qualifying Tournaments	15 March 2026	6th	1967	1994	1	Fourth place (1975)	14
Mali	Qualified through Qualifying Tournaments	17 March 2026	3rd	2010	2022	2	Eleventh place (2022)	18
Czech Republic	Qualified through Qualifying Tournaments	17 March 2026	4th	2006	2014	1	Runners-up (2010)	17
Turkey	Qualified through Qualifying Tournaments	17 March 2026	3rd	2014	2018	1	Fourth place (2014)	16
Japan	Qualified through Qualifying Tournaments	17 March 2026	10th	1964	2022	5	Runners-up (1975)	10
Hungary	Qualified through Qualifying Tournaments	17 March 2026	6th	1957	1998	1	Fifth place (1957)	19
Puerto Rico	Qualified through Qualifying Tournaments	17 March 2026	3rd	2018	2022	3	Eighth place (2022)	13

== Venues ==
The tournament was played in Berlin across two venues.

- The main venue was the Berlin Arena. This arena hosted two groups and the entire knockout stage. The venue previously hosted the 2024 European Men's Handball Championship and the latter stages of EuroBasket 2022. It was the first venue to host three EuroLeague Final Fours. The venue has also held many high-profile non-sporting events.
- The secondary arena was the Max-Schmeling-Halle. It hosted two groups in the first round. The venue previously hosted the 2007 World Men's Handball Championship, plus the finals of the 2013 Women's European Volleyball Championship, 2023 IHF Men's U21 Handball World Championship, plus two CEV Champions League finals in 2015 and 2019.

Berlin	2026 FIBA Women's Basketball World Cup is located in Germany	Berlin
Berlin Arena	2026 FIBA Women's Basketball World Cup is located in Germany	Max-Schmeling-Halle
Capacity: 14,000	2026 FIBA Women's Basketball World Cup is located in Germany	Capacity: 9,000

== Preparations ==
- The senate (city-state government) in Berlin decided to allocate €6 million to the event.
- On 13 March 2026, for the second edition in a row, Spanish basketball legend Pau Gasol was named the global ambassador for the tournament.

=== Marketing ===
==== Logo ====
The logo was unveiled on 12 August 2024. According to FIBA, the logo is supposed to depict "Berlin's status as a united metropolis that loves to party and celebrate".

==== Mascot ====
The mascot, "Bearlina", was revealed during the HipHop Ball at Red Town Hall on 15 November 2025. Bearlina is a bear (which is featured on the coat of arms of Berlin), whose design represents the lifestyle of the host city, including elements of punk, hip hop, graffiti art, and the design of the basketball used for FIBA competitions.

== Draw ==
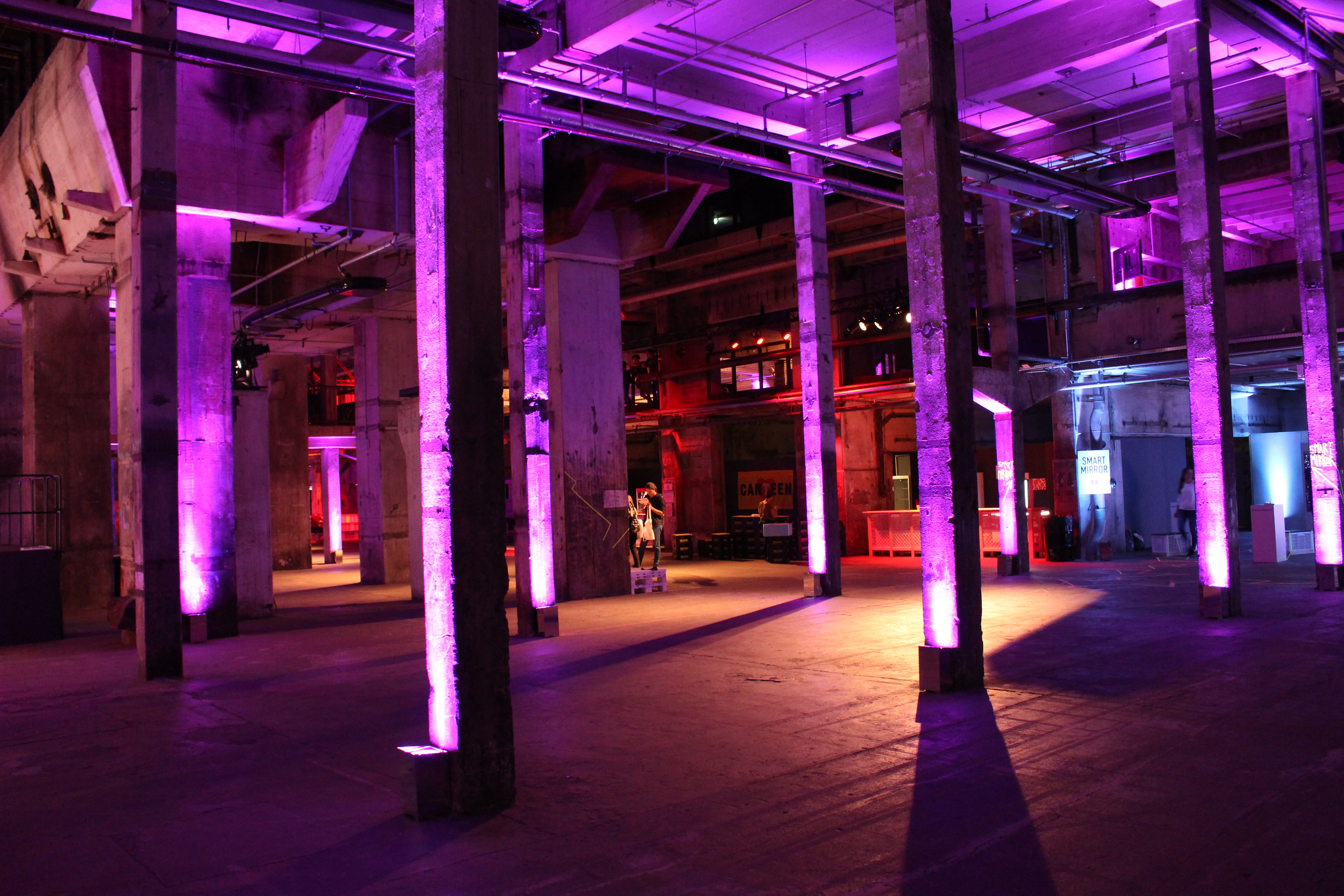
The Kraftwerk in Berlin hosted the draw.

The draw took place on 21 April 2026 at 18:00 CET at the Kraftwerk in Berlin. The draw was hosted by American actress, Brittney Elena, and German presenter, Matthias Killing. Australian basketball legend, Lauren Jackson, German handball player, Stefan Kretzschmar and breakdancer Jilou were the guests and assisted with the draw. The draw started with, in order, pots 1, 2, 3 and 4 being drawn, with each team selected then allocated into the first available group alphabetically. The position for the team within the group would then be drawn (for the purpose of the schedule). Before the draw, hosts Germany were pre-drawn into Group A. Regarding restrictions, a maximum of two teams from Europe are allowed in each group, while a maximum of one team from Africa, Americas and Asia/Oceania will be drawn in each group.

- 2026 FIBA Women's Basketball World Cup – Draw
- Draw Live Stream

=== Seeding ===
The seeding was revealed on 16 April 2026. The seeding was based on the FIBA Women's World Ranking as of 1 April 2026.

Pot 1
Team	Pos
Germany (H)	11
United States	1
France	2
Australia	3

Pot 2
Team	Pos
China	4
Belgium	5
Spain	6
Nigeria	8

Pot 3
Team	Pos
Japan	10
Puerto Rico	13
Italy	14
South Korea	15

Pot 4
Team	Pos
Turkey	16
Czech Republic	17
Mali	18
Hungary	19

=== Draw results ===
Group A
Pos	Team
A1	Japan
A2	Spain
A3	Germany (H)
A4	Mali

Group B
Pos	Team
B1	Hungary
B2	South Korea
B3	Nigeria
B4	France

Group C
Pos	Team
C1	Belgium
C2	Australia
C3	Puerto Rico
C4	Turkey

Group D
Pos	Team
D1	United States
D2	Czech Republic
D3	Italy
D4	China

=== Schedule ===
Schedule
Round	Gameday	Date
Preliminary round	Gameday 1	4 September 2026
Preliminary round	Gameday 2	5–6 September 2026
Preliminary round	Gameday 3	7 September 2026
Final round	Qualification to quarterfinals	8–9 September 2026
Final round	Quarter-finals	10 September 2026
Final round	Semi-finals	12 September 2026
Final round	Third place Final	13 September 2026

== Referees ==
The long list of 38 referees was announced on 2 April 2026. The final list of 28 referees was revealed on 13 August 2026.

- (Basketball Australia) James Griguol
- (Basketball Australia) Ruben Woolcock
- (Brazilian Basketball Confederation) Alan dos Santos
- (Bulgarian Basketball Federation) Ventsislav Velikov
- (Canada Basketball) Waseem Husainy
- (Canada Basketball) Maripier Malo
- (Chinese Basketball Association (organisation)) Sun Jian
- (Croatian Basketball Federation) Martin Vulić
- (Federación Ecuatoriana de Basquetbol) Carlos Peralta
- (Estonian Basketball Association) Mihkel Männiste
- (French Federation of Basketball) Yohan Rosso
- (Federación Nacional de Baloncesto de Honduras) Orlando Varela
- (Japan Basketball Association) Takaki Kato
- (Latvian Basketball Association) Gatis Saliņš
- (Fédération Malgache de Basket-Ball) Yann Davidson
- (Basketball New Zealand) Martin Davison
- (Norwegian Basketball Association) Viola Györgyi
- (Federación Panameña de Baloncesto) Julio Anaya
- (Polish Basketball Federation) Paulina Gajdosz
- (Polish Basketball Federation) Wojciech Liszka
- (Puerto Rican Basketball Federation) Johnny Batista
- (Puerto Rican Basketball Federation) Julirys Guzmán
- (Basketball Federation of Serbia) Petar Pešić
- (Basketball Federation of Slovenia) Boris Krejić
- (Spanish Basketball Federation) Ariadna Chueca
- (Turkish Basketball Federation) Çisil Güngör
- (Uruguayan Basketball Federation) Aline García
- (USA Basketball) Blanca Burns

== Squads ==
Each team consists of twelve players.

== Preliminary round ==
All times are local (UTC+2).

=== Classification of teams ===
1. Highest number of points earned, with each game result having a corresponding point:
  - Win: 2 points
  - Loss: 1 point
  - Loss by default: 1 point, with a final score of 2–0 for the opponents of the defaulting team if the latter team is not trailing or if the score is tied, or the score at the time of stoppage if they are trailing.
  - Loss by forfeit: 0 points, with a final score of 20–0 for the opponents of the forfeiting team.
2. Head-to-head record via points system above
3. Point difference in games among tied teams
4. Points for in games among tied teams
5. Point difference in all group games
6. Points for in all group games

=== Group A ===
Pos	Team	Pld	W	L	PF	PA	PD	Pts	Qualification
1	Spain	3	2	1	235	194	+41	5 (Note: Spain 83–53 Germany)	Quarterfinals
2	Germany (H)	3	2	1	210	199	+11	5	Qualification to quarterfinals
3	Japan	3	1	2	219	250	−31	4 (Note: Japan 102–97 Mali)	Qualification to quarterfinals
4	Mali	3	1	2	237	258	−21	4	

Source: FIBA
Rules for classification: 1) Points; 2) Head-to-head results; 3) Points difference; 4) Points scored.
(H) Hosts
Notes:

4 September 2026
Japan	102–97	Mali
Spain	83–53	Germany
5 September 2026
Mali	82–73	Spain
Germany	74–58	Japan
7 September 2026
Japan	59–79	Spain
Germany	83–58	Mali

=== Group B ===
Pos	Team	Pld	W	L	PF	PA	PD	Pts	Qualification
1	France	3	3	0	305	178	+127	6	Quarterfinals
2	Hungary	3	2	1	206	239	−33	5	Qualification to quarterfinals
3	South Korea	3	1	2	241	258	−17	4	Qualification to quarterfinals
4	Nigeria	3	0	3	204	281	−77	3	

Source: FIBA
Rules for classification: 1) Points; 2) Head-to-head results; 3) Points difference; 4) Points scored.

4 September 2026
South Korea	99–81	Nigeria
Hungary	53–99	France
5 September 2026
Nigeria	67–71	Hungary
France	95–69	South Korea
7 September 2026
Hungary	82–73	South Korea
Nigeria	56–111	France

=== Group C ===
Pos	Team	Pld	W	L	PF	PA	PD	Pts	Qualification
1	Belgium	3	3	0	245	207	+38	6	Quarterfinals
2	Australia	3	2	1	225	205	+20	5	Qualification to quarterfinals
3	Puerto Rico	3	1	2	193	217	−24	4	Qualification to quarterfinals
4	Turkey	3	0	3	217	251	−34	3	

Source: FIBA
Rules for classification: 1) Points; 2) Head-to-head results; 3) Points difference; 4) Points scored.

4 September 2026
Australia	70–54	Puerto Rico
Belgium	89–75	Turkey
6 September 2026
Turkey	71–87	Australia
Puerto Rico	64–76	Belgium
7 September 2026
Belgium	80–68	Australia
Puerto Rico	75–71	Turkey

=== Group D ===
Pos	Team	Pld	W	L	PF	PA	PD	Pts	Qualification
1	United States	3	3	0	254	177	+77	6	Quarterfinals
2	China	3	2	1	206	215	−9	5	Qualification to quarterfinals
3	Italy	3	1	2	166	180	−14	4	Qualification to quarterfinals
4	Czech Republic	3	0	3	188	242	−54	3	

Source: FIBA
Rules for classification: 1) Points; 2) Head-to-head results; 3) Points difference; 4) Points scored.

4 September 2026
United States	94–61	China
Czech Republic	54–63	Italy
6 September 2026
China	74–70 (OT)	Czech Republic
Italy	52–55	United States
7 September 2026
United States	105–64	Czech Republic
Italy	51–71	China

== Knockout stage ==
Qualification round
9 September
Italy	80
Australia	82
8 September
Hungary	84
Japan	63
9 September
Puerto Rico	72
China	75
8 September
Germany	94
South Korea	56

Quarterfinals
10 September
Australia	66
Spain	89
10 September
United States	108
Hungary	56
10 September
China	61
France	90
10 September
Belgium	74
Germany	93

Semifinals
12 September
Spain	66
United States	76
12 September
France	86
Germany	64

Final
13 September
United States	97
France	79
Third place
13 September
Spain	81
Germany	58

=== Final ===
13 September 2026
20:00

Boxscore

United States	97–79	France
Scoring by quarter: 17–20, 26–25, 30–12, 24–22
Pts: Stewart 22; Rebs: Stewart 10; Asts: Gray, Young 5		Pts: Malonga 21; Rebs: Malonga 6 Asts: Williams 7

Berlin Arena, Berlin
Attendance: 12,233
Referees: Julio Anaya (PAN), Ariadna Chueca (ESP), Gatis Saliņš (LAT)

== Final standings ==
United States trophy ceremony

Rank	Team	GP	W/L
1st place, gold medalist(s)	United States	6	6–0
2nd place, silver medalist(s)	France	6	5–1
3rd place, bronze medalist(s)	Spain	6	4–2
4th	Germany	7	4–3
Eliminated in Quarterfinals
5th	Belgium	4	3–1
6th	Australia	5	3–2
7th	China	5	3–2
8th	Hungary	5	3–2
Eliminated in Qualification round
9th	Italy	4	1–3
10th	South Korea	4	1–3
11th	Puerto Rico	4	1–3
12th	Japan	4	1–3
Eliminated in Group Stage
13th	Mali	3	1–2
14th	Turkey	3	0–3
15th	Czech Republic	3	0–3
16th	Nigeria	3	0–3

Qualified for the 2028 Summer Olympics

== Statistics and awards ==
=== Statistical leaders ===
==== Players ====
Points

Name	PPG
(Belgium) Emma Meesseman	21.0
(China) Han Xu	18.8
(France) Gabby Williams	18.7
(Spain) Iyana Martín	17.5
(Puerto Rico) Imani McGee-Stafford	17.0

Rebounds

Name	RPG
(Puerto Rico) Imani McGee-Stafford	12.0
(China) Han Xu	10.8
(Hungary) Dorka Juhász	10.4
(Australia) Stephanie Talbot	8.6
(Germany) Leonie Fiebich	8.6

Assists

Name	APG
(Belgium) Julie Allemand	7.8
(Japan) Rui Machida	5.8
(South Korea) Heo Ye-eun	5.8
(China) Yang Shuyu	5.6
(United States) Caitlin Clark	5.3

Blocks

Name	BPG
(Japan) Ramu Tokashiki	2.3
(Puerto Rico) Imani McGee-Stafford	1.8
(Belgium) Kyara Linskens	1.5
(Belgium) Emma Meesseman	1.5
(China) Zhang Ziyu	1.4

Steals

Name	SPG
(Puerto Rico) Trinity San Antonio	5.0
(France) Gabby Williams	2.8
(South Korea) Park Ji-hyun	2.3
(United States) Rhyne Howard	2.3
(Spain) Iyana Martín	2.2

Efficiency

Name	EFFPG
(Belgium) Emma Meesseman	25.0
(France) Gabby Williams	22.8
(Puerto Rico) Trinity San Antonio	22.5
(China) Han Xu	21.8
(Australia) Stephanie Talbot	21.0

==== Teams ====
Points

Name	PPG
France	93.3
United States	89.2
Belgium	79.8
Mali	79.0
Spain	78.5

Rebounds

Name	RPG
United States	44.2
Germany	43.1
Hungary	41.2
Belgium	41.0
Puerto Rico	39.5

Assists

Name	APG
South Korea	24.5
Belgium	23.5
United States	22.3
France	22.2
Mali	21.0

Blocks

Name	BPG
Japan	4.0
Puerto Rico	4.0
United States	3.8
Belgium	3.5
Mali	3.0

Steals

Name	SPG
France	11.8
Czech Republic	11.3
South Korea	10.3
Puerto Rico	9.8
Spain	9.8

Efficiency

Name	EFFPG
France	114.0
United States	109.5
Belgium	97.5
Spain	92.3
Germany	87.0

=== Awards ===
The awards were announced on 13 September 2026.

Award	Player
All-Tournament First Team	(Spain) Iyana Martín
All-Tournament First Team	(Germany) Leonie Fiebich
All-Tournament First Team	(United States) Breanna Stewart
All-Tournament First Team	(France) Gabby Williams
All-Tournament First Team	(United States) Jackie Young
All-Tournament Second Team	(Belgium) Emma Meesseman
All-Tournament Second Team	(France) Janelle Salaün
All-Tournament Second Team	(Germany) Nyara Sabally
All-Tournament Second Team	(Australia) Stephanie Talbot
All-Tournament Second Team	(China) Han Xu
Most Valuable Player	(United States) Breanna Stewart
Best Defensive Player	(France) Gabby Williams
Rising Star	(Spain) Iyana Martín
Best Coach	(Spain) Miguel Méndez

== See also ==
- 2027 FIBA Basketball World Cup
