= Dominique Malonga =

Dominique Malonga may refer to:

- Dominique Malonga (footballer) (born 1989), Congolese footballer
- Dominique Malonga (basketball) (born 2005), French basketball player
