= Agathe N'Nindjem-Yolemp =

Cameroonian basketball player

Personal information
- Born: August 4, 1980 (age 46) Yaoundé, Cameroon
- Listed height: 1.90 m (6 ft 3 in)
- Position: Center

Career history
- 2000-2002: Dexia Namur
- 2003: ESB Villeneuve-d'Ascq
- (2003-2004): Toulouse Launaguet Basket
- 2004-2005: CB Ciudad de Burgos
- 2006: Mourenx Basket Club
- 2007: CB Avenida
- 2009-2010: Toulouse Métropole Basket
- 2011-2012: Basket Catalan Perpignan Méditerranée

Agathe N'Nindjem-Yolemp (born August 4, 1980) is a Cameroonian female basketball player.

== Personal life ==
N'Nindjem-Yolemp's daughter, Dominique Malonga, is a professional basketball player.
