= Iyana Martín =

Spanish basketball player (born 2006)

Iyana Martín Carrión
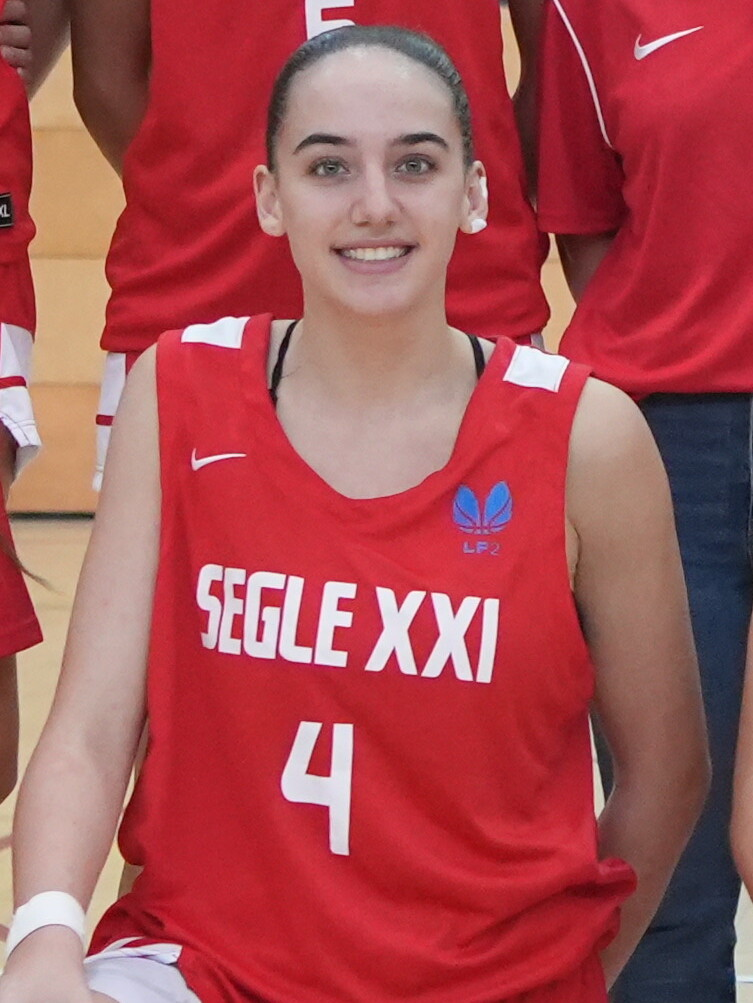
- Martín in 2023

No. 4 – Spar Girona
- Position: Point guard
- League: Liga Femenina de Baloncesto

Personal information
- Born: 18 January 2006 (age 20) Oviedo, Asturias, Spain
- Listed height: 5 ft 9 in (1.75 m)

Career information
- WNBA draft: 2026: 1st round, 7th overall pick
- Drafted by: Portland Fire
- Playing career: 2022–present

Career history
- 2022–2024: Segle XXI
- 2024–2026: Perfumerias Avenida
- 2026–present: Spar Girona

Career highlights
- EuroLeague Young Player of the Year (2025); FIBA Under-19 World Cup MVP (2023)
- Stats at Basketball Reference
Medals
Women's basketball
Representing Spain
World Cup
Bronze medal – third place	2026 Germany
EuroBasket
Silver medal – second place	2025 Czech Republic/Germany/Italy/Greece
FIBA Under-19 World Cup
Silver medal – second place	2023 Spain	Team
FIBA Under-17 World Cup
Silver medal – second place	2022 Hungary	Team
FIBA Under-16 European Championship
Silver medal – second place	2022 Portugal	Team

Iyana Martín Carrión (born 18 January 2006) is a Spanish professional basketball player for Spar Girona of the Liga Femenina de Baloncesto. She was named Most Valuable Player of the 2023 FIBA Under-19 World Cup.

== Playing career ==
Martín began her career with Segle XXI. On 16 May 2024, she signed a three-year contract with the Perfumerias Avenida of the Liga Femenina de Baloncesto. During the 2024–25 season, in her rookie year she recorded 10.5 points, 4.3 rebounds, and 3.4 assists per game and was named the EuroLeague Young Player of the Year.

On 13 April 2026, Martín was drafted seventh overall by the Portland Fire in the 2026 WNBA draft, becoming the first pick in franchise history. Following the draft, general manager Vanja Černivec announced that Martín wants to focus on training and playing with the Spanish national team during the 2026 FIBA World Cup in September 2026, and did not join the Fire for the 2026 WNBA season.

On 22 May 2026, she signed a two-year contract with Spar Girona of the Liga Femenina de Baloncesto.

== National team career ==
In July 2022, Martín represented Spain at the 2022 FIBA Under-17 Women's Basketball World Cup where she averaged 13.4 points, 2.3 rebounds and led the tournament with 6.1 assists per game. During the gold medal game against the United States, she scored a team-high 14 points and eight assists and won a silver medal. She was subsequently named to the all-tournament team. The next month, she then represented Spain at the 2022 FIBA U16 Women's European Championship, where she averaged 17.1 points, 2.1 rebounds, 3.9 assists and 3.0 steals per game. During the gold medal game against France, she scored a game-high 22 points and won a silver medal. She was subsequently named to the all-tournament team and tournament MVP.

Martín represented Spain at the 2023 FIBA Under-19 Women's Basketball World Cup where she led her team in scoring and averaged 16.1 points, 3.3 assists, 2.7 rebounds, and 2.6 steals per game. During the gold medal game against the United States, she scored a game-high 19 points and won a silver medal. She was subsequently named to the all-tournament team and named Most Valuable Player.

She represented Spain at the 2026 FIBA Women's Basketball World Cup where she averaged 17.5 points, 4.2 assists, 3.3 rebounds and 2.2 steals per game. In the group phase, she scored 20 points in back-to-back games against Japan and Mali, becoming the first player aged under 21 years old to score at least 20 points in back-to-back games at the FIBA Women's Basketball World Cup in the 21st century. During the semifinals against the United States, she scored 17 points in a 66–76 loss. She became the youngest player to score more than 16 points in a Women's World Cup semifinal. During the third place game against Germany, she scored a game-high 22 points and nine assists to win a bronze medal. She became the first player under the age of 21 to score 20 or more points in three World Cup games. Following the tournament she was named to the FIBA World Cup All-First Team and awarded the Rising Star Award.
