= Ariadna Chueca Moreno =

Spanish basketball referee (born 1991)

Ariadna Chueca
- Chueca in March 2026

Personal information
- Born: 8 April 1991 (age 35) Santa Cruz de Tenerife, Spain

Ariadna Chueca Moreno (born 8 April 1991) is a Spanish basketball referee and former basketball player.

== Career ==
Chueca Moreno was born on 8 April 1991 in Santa Cruz de Tenerife and grew up on Gran Canaria, where she began her career as a basketball player in 2013. She also worked as a coach and later moved to Finland and took up refereeing in 2015. Chueca achieved the highest qualification as a referee in 2019, when she earned the FIBA international badge. She has worked in different tournaments of the Spanish Basketball Federation and has overseen games at the Liga ACB since 2025.

At the international level, Chueca has taken part in national team and club matches, including the 2022 FIBA Women's Basketball World Cup. She took a brief leave from refereeing in 2023 when she assumed the role of executive for the referees body of the Canarias Basketball Federation, remaining in that position for one year. In 2024, Chueca became the first Spanish woman to referee in the NBA Summer League in Las Vegas. That same year she was chosen to represent Spain in the women's tournament of the 2024 Summer Olympics in Paris and in 2025 took part in the EuroBasket 2025 and the EuroBasket Women 2025 competitions. At the club level, Chueca refereed the 2024 EuroLeague Women Final Four in Mersin.

On 13 September 2026, Chueca was one of the referees at the final game of the 2026 FIBA Women's Basketball World Cup in Germany between the United States and France.
