= Nyara Sabally =

German basketball player (born 2000)

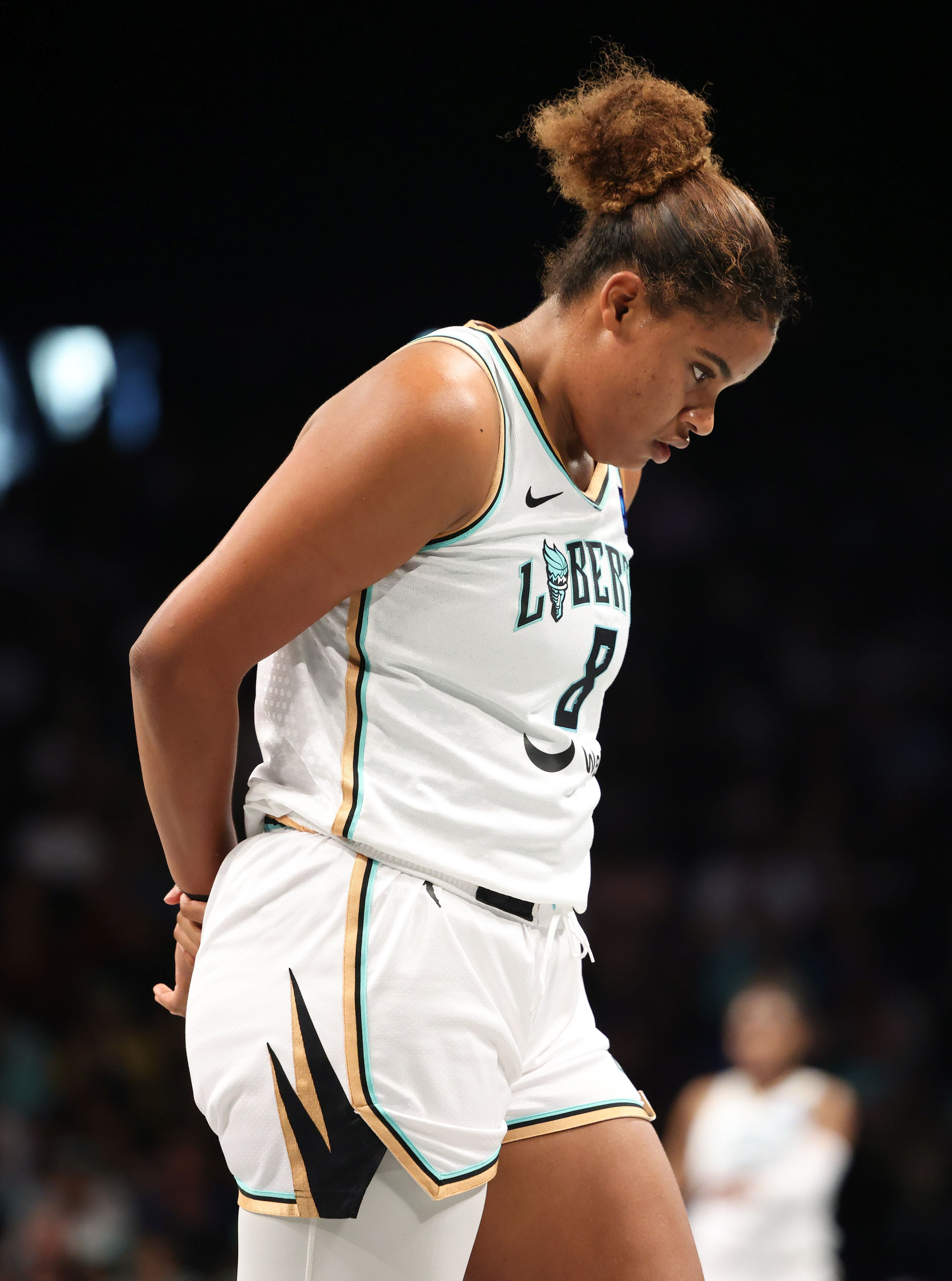
- Sabally with the New York Liberty in 2024

No. 8 – Toronto Tempo
- Position: Forward
- League: WNBA

Personal information
- Born: 26 February 2000 (age 26) Bandon, Oregon
- Listed height: 6 ft 5 in (1.96 m)
- Listed weight: 214 lb (97 kg)

Career information
- College: Oregon (2018–2022)
- WNBA draft: 2022: 1st round, 5th overall pick
- Drafted by: New York Liberty
- Playing career: 2023–present
- Coaching career: 2022–present

Career history

Playing
- 2023–2025: New York Liberty
- 2023–2024: USK Prague
- 2024–2025: Fenerbahçe
- 2026–present: Toronto Tempo

Coaching
- 2022–2023: Sacramento State (assistant)

Career highlights
- WNBA champion (2024); WNBA Commissioner's Cup Champion (2023); 2× All-Pac-12 (2021, 2022)
- Stats at Basketball Reference
Medals
Women's basketball
Representing Germany
FIBA U-18 European Championship
| Gold medal – first place | 2018 Italy | Team |

Nyara Sabally (born 26 February 2000) is a German professional basketball player for the Toronto Tempo of the Women's National Basketball Association (WNBA). She also served as an assistant coach for Sacramento State. She played college basketball at Oregon. She represented Germany at the 2018 FIBA U18 Women's European Championship and won a gold medal. She also represented Germany at the 2024 Summer Olympics.

== College career ==
On 7 November 2017, Sabally signed with Oregon. During the 2018–19 season in her freshman year, she sat out the season after suffering a torn ACL during the championship game of the 2018 FIBA U18 Women's European Championship in August 2018. During the 2019–20 season in her redshirt freshman year, she re-tore her ACL in the summer of 2019 and missed a second consecutive season.

During the 2020–21 season in her redshirt sophomore year, she played in 23 of Oregon's 24 games, making 21 starts. She led Oregon in scoring (12.9), rebounding (7.3), field goals (122), double-doubles (4) and double-figure scoring games (19). She ranked third in the Pac-12 in field-goal percentage (54.7), third in offensive rebounding (2.7), fourth in rebounding and tenth in scoring. Following the season she was named to the All-Pac-12 team.

During the 2021–22 season in her redshirt junior year, she led the team in scoring and rebounding and finished sixth in the conference in scoring (15.4) and third in rebounding (7.8). She recorded eight double-doubles, and reached double figures in scoring in 19 of the 24 games. She became the first Pac-12 player since Chiney Ogwumike in 2013 to average at least 15 points, seven rebounds, 1.5 assists and 1.3 steals and blocks over the course of a season. Following the season she was again named to the All-Pac-12 team.

On 28 March 2022, Sabally declared for the 2022 WNBA draft. She finished her career at Oregon with 666 points, 354 rebounds and 87 assists in two seasons.

== Professional career ==
=== WNBA ===
==== New York Liberty (2023–2025) ====
On 11 April 2022, Sabally was drafted fifth overall by the New York Liberty in the 2022 WNBA draft. On 15 April 2022, Liberty general manager Jonathan Kolb announced Sabally would miss the 2022 WNBA season due to injury, after she aggravated her right knee, which has twice required surgery for a torn ACL. On 28 February 2023, Sabally signed a rookie scale contract with the Liberty. She missed the first half of the 2024 WNBA season recovering from a back injury before the Olympics break, where Sabally joined her Liberty teammate Leonie Fiebich on the German national basketball team. During game 5 of the 2024 WNBA Finals against the Minnesota Lynx, she scored 13 points and seven rebounds in 17 minutes off the bench to help the Liberty win their first WNBA championship in franchise history. During the third quarter she scored seven consecutive points for the Liberty, helping them gain their first lead of the game. During overtime she recorded a steal and a layup to extend the Liberty's lead to five points. She also recorded a defensive rebound with 13 seconds remaining in overtime to help secure the win. The Liberty's star player Breanna Stewart said in the post game press conference that Sabally was "The X Factor" for contributing to the team's championship win.

On 12 May 2025, the Liberty exercised Sabally's fourth-year rookie option, extending her contract through the 2026 season.

==== Toronto Tempo (2026–present) ====
On 3 April 2026, Sabally was drafted fourth overall by the Toronto Tempo in the 2026 WNBA expansion draft.

=== Overseas ===
Sabally played with USK Prague of the Czech Women's Basketball League during the 2023–2024 season.

Sabally joined Fenerbahçe of the Turkish Super League in January 2025.

== Career statistics ==
Legend
| GP | Games played | GS | Games started | MPG | Minutes per game | RPG | Rebounds per game |
| APG | Assists per game | SPG | Steals per game | BPG | Blocks per game | PPG | Points per game |
| TO | Turnovers per game | FG% | Field-goal percentage | 3P% | 3-point field-goal percentage | FT% | Free-throw percentage |
| **Bold** | Career best | ° | League leader |

| † | Denotes season(s) in which Sabally won a WNBA championship |

=== WNBA ===
==== Regular season ====
WNBA regular season statistics
| Year | Team | GP | GS | MPG | FG% | 3P% | FT% | RPG | APG | SPG | BPG | TO | PPG |
|---|---|---|---|---|---|---|---|---|---|---|---|---|---|
| 2023 | New York | **33** | 0 | 7.9 | .424 | .222 | **.750** | 2.1 | .2 | .1 | .2 | **.5** | 2.3 |
| 2024^{†} | New York | 26 | 0 | 13.5 | **.575** | .000 | .700 | 4.0 | .6 | .9 | .7 | **.5** | 4.9 |
| 2025 | New York | 17 | 10 | 17.9 | .487 | .143 | .680 | 4.5 | .8 | .5 | **1.0** | .9 | 5.4 |
| 2026 | Toronto | 24 | **20** | **23.9** | .527 | **.392** | .720 | **5.3** | **1.7** | **1.0** | .9 | 1.6 | **12.3** |
| **Career** | 4 years, 2 teams | 100 | 30 | 14.9 | .515 | .333 | .715 | 3.8 | .8 | .6 | .6 | .9 | 5.9 |

==== Playoffs ====
WNBA playoff statistics
| Year | Team | GP | GS | MPG | FG% | 3P% | FT% | RPG | APG | SPG | BPG | TO | PPG |
|---|---|---|---|---|---|---|---|---|---|---|---|---|---|
| 2023 | New York | 4 | 0 | 1.3 | — | — | — | .0 | .3 | .3 | .0 | **.0** | .0 |
| 2024^{†} | New York | **9** | 0 | **10.1** | **.542** | — | **.875** | **3.4** | .0 | .7 | **.7** | 1.7 | **4.4** |
| 2025 | New York | 1 | 0 | 7.0 | .000 | — | .500 | 1.0 | **1.0** | **1.0** | .0 | **.0** | 1.0 |
| **Career** | 3 years, 1 team | 14 | 0 | 7.4 | .481 | .000 | .833 | 2.3 | .1 | .6 | .4 | 1.1 | 2.9 |

=== College ===
Ratios
| Year | Team | GP | GS | MP | FG% | 3P% | FT% | RBG | APG | BPG | SPG | PPG |
|---|---|---|---|---|---|---|---|---|---|---|---|---|
| 2019–20 | Oregon | 1 | 0 | .0 | — | — | .0 | .0 | .0 | .0 | .0 | .0 |
| 2020–21 | Oregon | 23 | **21** | 24.5 | **.547** | **.571** | .616 | 7.3 | 1.8 | 1.2 | 1.0 | 12.9 |
| 2021–22 | Oregon | **24** | 20 | **26.6** | .527 | .534 | **.725** | **7.8** | **1.9** | **1.4** | **1.4** | **15.4** |
| | **Career** | 48 | 41 | 25.0 | .536 | .480 | .684 | 7.4 | 1.8 | 1.2 | 1.3 | 13.9 |

Totals
| Year | Team | GP | GS | MP | FG | FGA | 3P | 3PA | FT | FTA | REB | A | BK | ST | PTS |
|---|---|---|---|---|---|---|---|---|---|---|---|---|---|---|---|
| 2019–20 | Oregon | 1 | 0 | 0 | 0 | 0 | 0 | 0 | 0 | 0 | 0 | 0 | 0 | 0 | 0 |
| 2020–21 | Oregon | 23 | 21 | 563 | 122 | 223 | 8 | 14 | 45 | 73 | 167 | 42 | 22 | 27 | 297 |
| 2021–22 | Oregon | 24 | 20 | 639 | 139 | 264 | 4 | 11 | 87 | 120 | 187 | 45 | 33 | 34 | 369 |
| | **Career** | 48 | 41 | 1202 | 261 | 487 | 12 | 25 | 132 | 193 | 354 | 87 | 60 | 56 | 666 |

== National team career ==
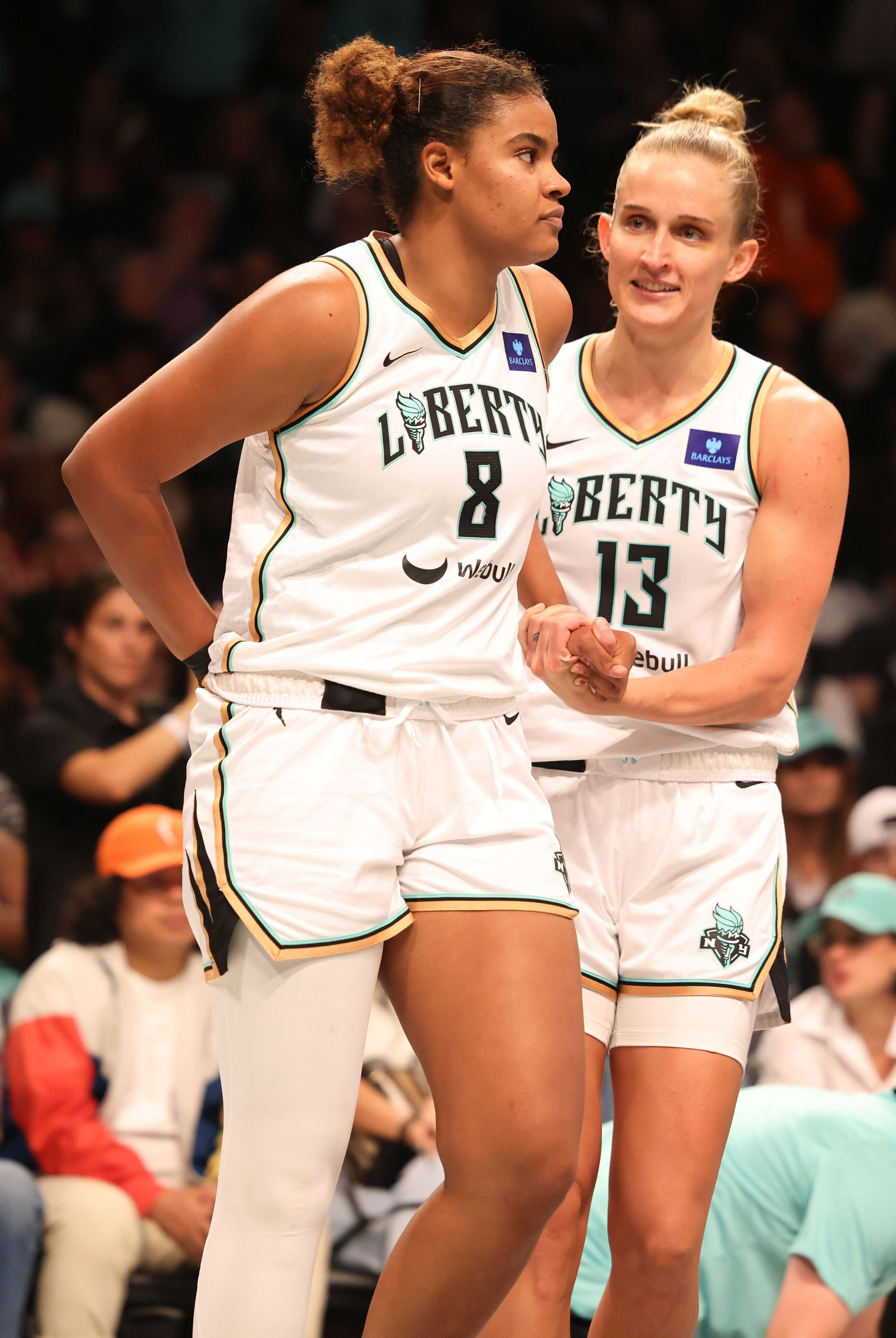
Sabally (left) with her Germany national team and New York Liberty teammate Leonie Fiebich in 2024

Sabally made her international debut for Germany at the 2015 FIBA Europe Under-16 Championship for Women, where she averaged nine points, 13.2 rebounds and 1.8 assists per game. She represented Germany at the 2018 FIBA U18 Women's European Championship, where she averaged 17.3 points, 12.8 rebounds and 1.8 assists per game, and won a gold medal, and was named tournament MVP.

On 15 July 2024, Sabally was named to Germany women's national basketball team to compete at the 2024 Summer Olympics. On 29 July 2024, in Germany's first group stage game against Belgium, she suffered an injury when teammate Leonie Fiebich inadvertently hit her in the chin with her shoulder while passing her on a handoff in the final minute of the third quarter. Prior to her injury, she was tied with Fiebich as the team's second-leading scorer with 16 points, behind only her sister Satou Sabally. Germany defeated Belgium 83–69, its first ever win in Olympic competition.

== Coaching career ==
On 12 July 2022, Sabally was named an assistant coach for Sacramento State. During her first season, she helped lead the Hornet to a 25–8 record, the Big Sky Conference regular season championship, 2023 Big Sky tournament championship, and their first ever appearance in the 2023 NCAA tournament.

== Personal life ==
Nyara's older sister Satou, who played for Oregon in both seasons that Nyara missed due to injury, is a professional basketball player for the New York Liberty of the WNBA.She is a Muslim.
