= Leonie Fiebich =

German basketball player (born 2000)

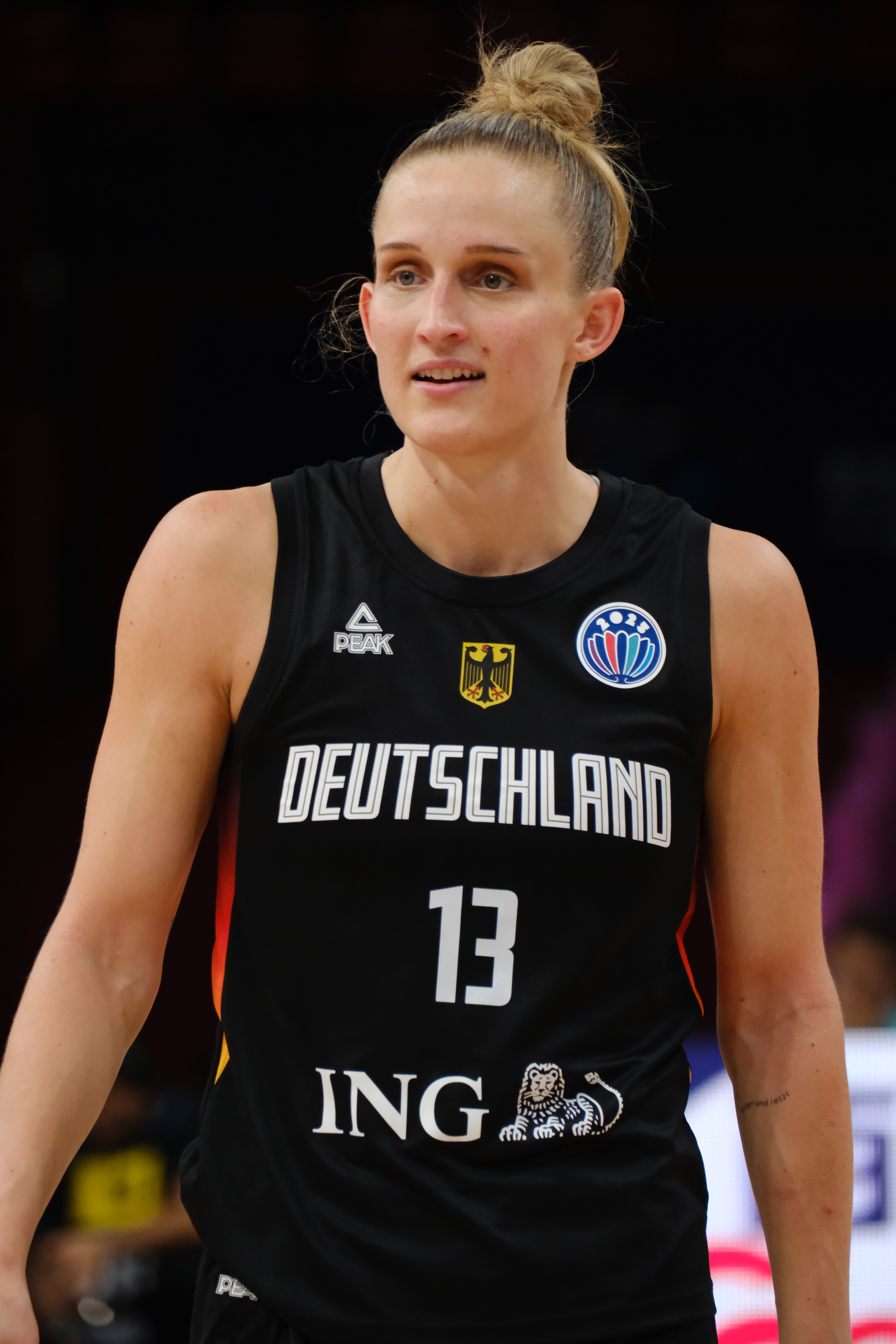
- Fiebich with Germany in 2025

No. 13 – New York Liberty
- Position: Forward
- League: WNBA

Personal information
- Born: 10 January 2000 (age 26) Landsberg, Germany
- Listed height: 6 ft 4 in (1.93 m)

Career information
- WNBA draft: 2020: 2nd round, 22nd overall pick
- Drafted by: Los Angeles Sparks
- Playing career: 2014–present

Career history
- 2014–2016: DJK Landsberg
- 2016–2018: Jahn München
- 2018–2021: Wasserburg
- 2021–2022: Flammes Carolo Basket
- 2022: Warwick Senators
- 2022–2024: Casademont Zaragoza
- 2024–present: New York Liberty
- 2024–2026: Valencia Basket

Career highlights
- WNBA champion (2024); WNBA Commissioner's Cup winner (2026); WNBA All-Rookie Team (2024); All-EuroLeague First Team (2024); 2× Spanish League champion (2025, 2026); 2× Spanish Cup winner (2023, 2026); 2× Spanish League MVP (2023, 2024); 2× Spanish League First Team (2023, 2024); NBL1 National champion (2022); NBL1 National Finals Championship Game MVP (2022); NBL1 National Finals All-Star Five (2022); NBL1 West champion (2022); NBL1 West Grand Final MVP (2022)
- Stats at Basketball Reference
Medals
Representing Germany
Women's basketball
FIBA U16 Women's European Championship
Silver medal – second place	2016 Italy	national team
FIBA U-18 European Championship
Gold medal – first place	2018 Italy	national team

Leonie Fiebich (born 10 January 2000) is a German professional basketball player for the New York Liberty of the Women's National Basketball Association (WNBA). She was drafted by the Los Angeles Sparks in the second round of the 2020 WNBA draft and has played for the German national basketball team.

== Early life ==
Fiebich grew up in Landsberg, Germany, where she attended Johann-Winklhofer secondary school. In 2014, she debuted for the DJK Landsberg women's team at the age of 14. She played at the center position.

== Professional career ==
Fiebich started her professional career with TS Jahn München in the 2.Bundesliga in 2016. In her first season, she averaged 12.1 points, 8.5 rebounds and 1.3 assists per game. In her second season, she averaged 16.2 points, 7.4 rebounds and 2.1 assists per game.

Fiebich joined Wasserburg for the 2018–19 season. She was named best Bundesliga newcomer of the 2018–19 season after she averaged 10.3 points, 8 rebounds and 1.6 assists per game. She played just one game in the 2019–20 season after she tore her cruciate ligament at the 2019 FIBA Under-19 Women's Basketball World Cup. She returned to Wasserburg for the 2020–21 season.

For the 2021–22 season, Fiebich joined French team Flammes Carolo Basket. She then moved to Australia to play for the Warwick Senators during the 2022 NBL1 West season. Fiebich won the grand final MVP award at Warwick and then dominated the NBL1 national championships, leading the Senators to victory as the tournament MVP.

For the 2022–23 season, Fiebich joined Casademont Zaragoza of the Liga Femenina de Baloncesto. She returned to Zaragoza for the 2023–24 season. On 24 May 2024, after two seasons at the club, she confirmed her departure to the WNBA. She was a two-time Spanish League MVP with Zaragoza, leading her team to a Spanish Cup title in 2023 and also earned All-EuroLeague First Team in 2024. She was Zaragoza's leading scorer during the 2023–24 EuroLeague season with 12.4 points per game.

On 19 December 2024, Fiebich signed with Valencia Basket until the end of the 2025–26 season. She debuted for Valencia on 4 January 2025 and went on help the team win the league championship in the 2024–25 season, scoring 12 points in game two of the finals series against Zaragoza. In 22 games to finish the 2024–25 season, she averaged 9.8 points, 2.8 rebounds, 2.7 assists and 1.0 steals per game. In 28 games in 2025–26, she averaged 12.3 points, 4.4 rebounds, 1.9 assists and 1.3 steals per game.

=== WNBA ===
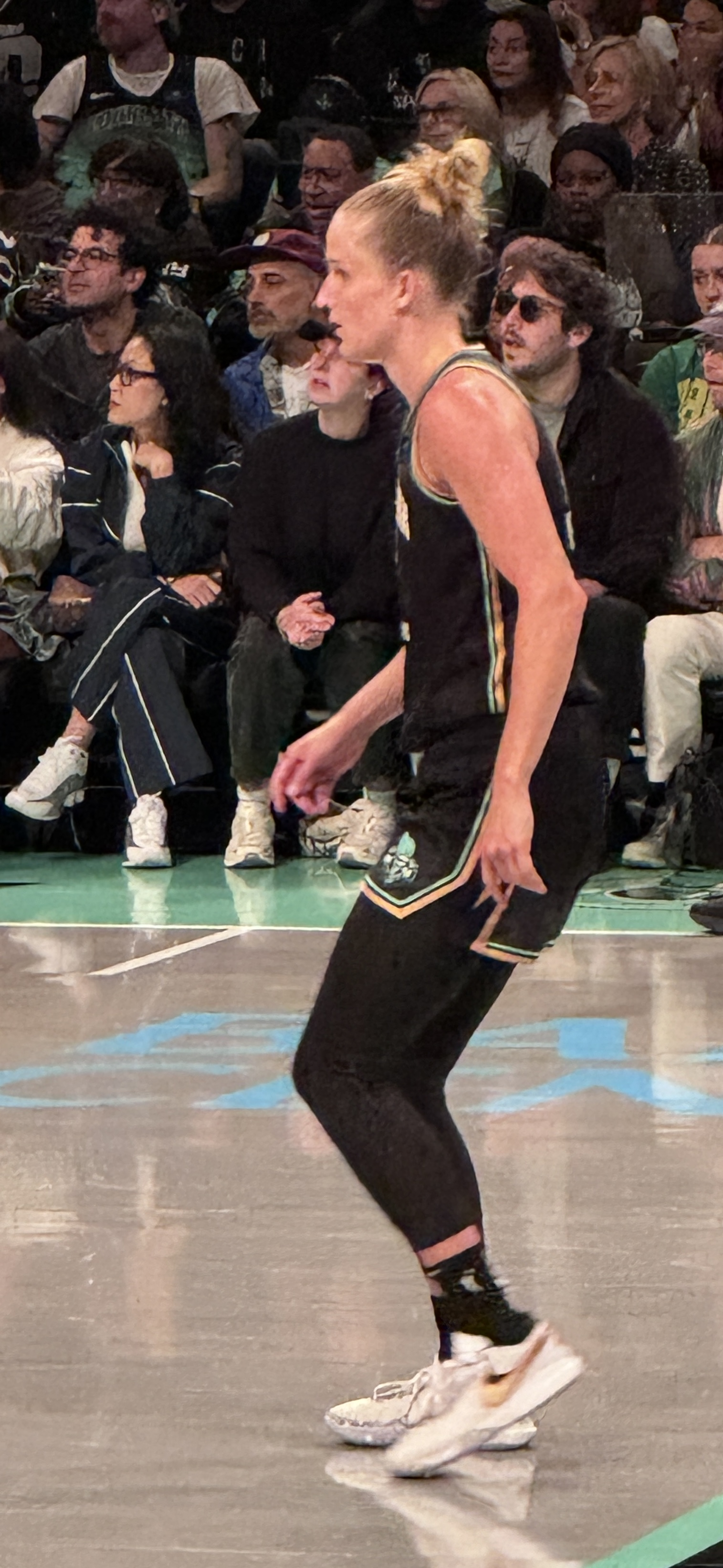
Fiebich playing for the New York Liberty on 8 September 2024.

On 17 April 2020, the Los Angeles Sparks selected Fiebich with the 22nd overall pick in the 2020 WNBA draft. In May 2021, her player rights were traded to the Chicago Sky. In February 2023, her player rights were acquired by the New York Liberty in a four-team trade.

In February 2024, Fiebich signed a rookie scale contract with the Liberty. She was named to the Liberty's starting lineup for the 2024 WNBA playoffs and broke the record for the most points scored by a Liberty player in their play-off debut with 21. For the season, she was named to the WNBA All Rookie Team. She helped the Liberty win the WNBA championship with a 3–2 Finals victory over the Minnesota Lynx. Fiebich had 13 points and seven rebounds in the game five 67–62 overtime win.

In June 2026, Fiebich won the Commissioner's Cup with the New York Liberty.

== National team career ==
=== Junior teams ===
Fiebich won the silver medal with the German national under-16 basketball team at the 2016 FIBA Under16 European Championship where she averaged 11.9 points, 11.6 rebounds and 1.6 assists per game. She also participated at the 2018 FIBA Under18 European Championship where she won the gold medal and averaged 11.7 points, 8.7 rebounds and 2.3 assists per game and was selected to the "team of the tournament. She also participated at the 2019 FIBA Under-19 Basketball World Cup where she averaged 7 points, 9 rebounds and 3.3 assists per game.

=== Senior team ===
In October 2018, Fiebich made her debut with the German national basketball team. She played for Germany at the 2024 Summer Olympics, where the team placed fifth. A year later, when Germany co-hosted the preliminary round of the EuroBasket Women, the team lost to Belgium in the Quarterfinals, ultimately taking fifth place. Germany hosted the 2026 FIBA Women's Basketball World Cup, where they finished fourth overall. At the end of the tournament, Fiebich was selected as part of the All-Tournament First Team.

== Career statistics ==
Legend
GP	Games played	GS	Games started	MPG	Minutes per game	RPG	Rebounds per game
APG	Assists per game	SPG	Steals per game	BPG	Blocks per game	PPG	Points per game
TO	Turnovers per game	FG%	Field-goal percentage	3P%	3-point field-goal percentage	FT%	Free-throw percentage
**Bold**	Career best	°	League leader

†	Denotes seasons in which Fiebich won a WNBA championship

=== WNBA ===
==== Regular season ====
WNBA regular season statistics
Year	Team	GP	GS	MPG	FG%	3P%	FT%	RPG	APG	SPG	BPG	TO	PPG
2020	Did not appear in league												
2021	Did not appear in league												
2022	Did not appear in league												
2023	Did not appear in league												
2024^{†}	New York	**40**°	15	20.9	.478	**.433**	.720	3.0	1.8	1.0	.2	**1.0**	6.7
2025	New York	37	**37**	28.1	**.489**	.425	**.871**	**3.5**	1.7	.9	**.4**	1.2	8.7
2026	New York	21	21	**28.7**	.432	.412	.853	3.0	**2.1**	**1.1**	.1	1.8	**8.8**
**Career**	3 years, 1 team	98	73	25.3	.471	.425	.835	3.2	1.8	1.0	.2	1.3	7.9

==== Playoffs ====
WNBA playoff statistics
Year	Team	GP	GS	MPG	FG%	3P%	FT%	RPG	APG	SPG	BPG	TO	PPG
2024^{†}	New York	**11**	**11**	31.0	**.542**	**.521**	**1.000**°	3.8	**2.4**	**.8**	.0	**.7**	**11.6**
2025	New York	3	3	30.3	.278	.250	**1.000**	3.7	1.3	.3	**.3**	2.0	5.0
2026	New York	5	5	**35.8**	.484	.409	**1.000**	**5.0**	2.2	**.8**	.2	2.0	8.8
**Career**	3 years, 1 team	19	19	32.2	.492	.451	1.000	4.1	2.2	.7	.1	1.3	9.8

== Personal life ==
Fiebich's father, Matthias Fiebich, was deputy chairman of DJK Landsberg in 2014. Her brother Jonas was also an active basketball player in 2014.
