= Julio Anaya =

Panamanian basketball referee (born 1991)

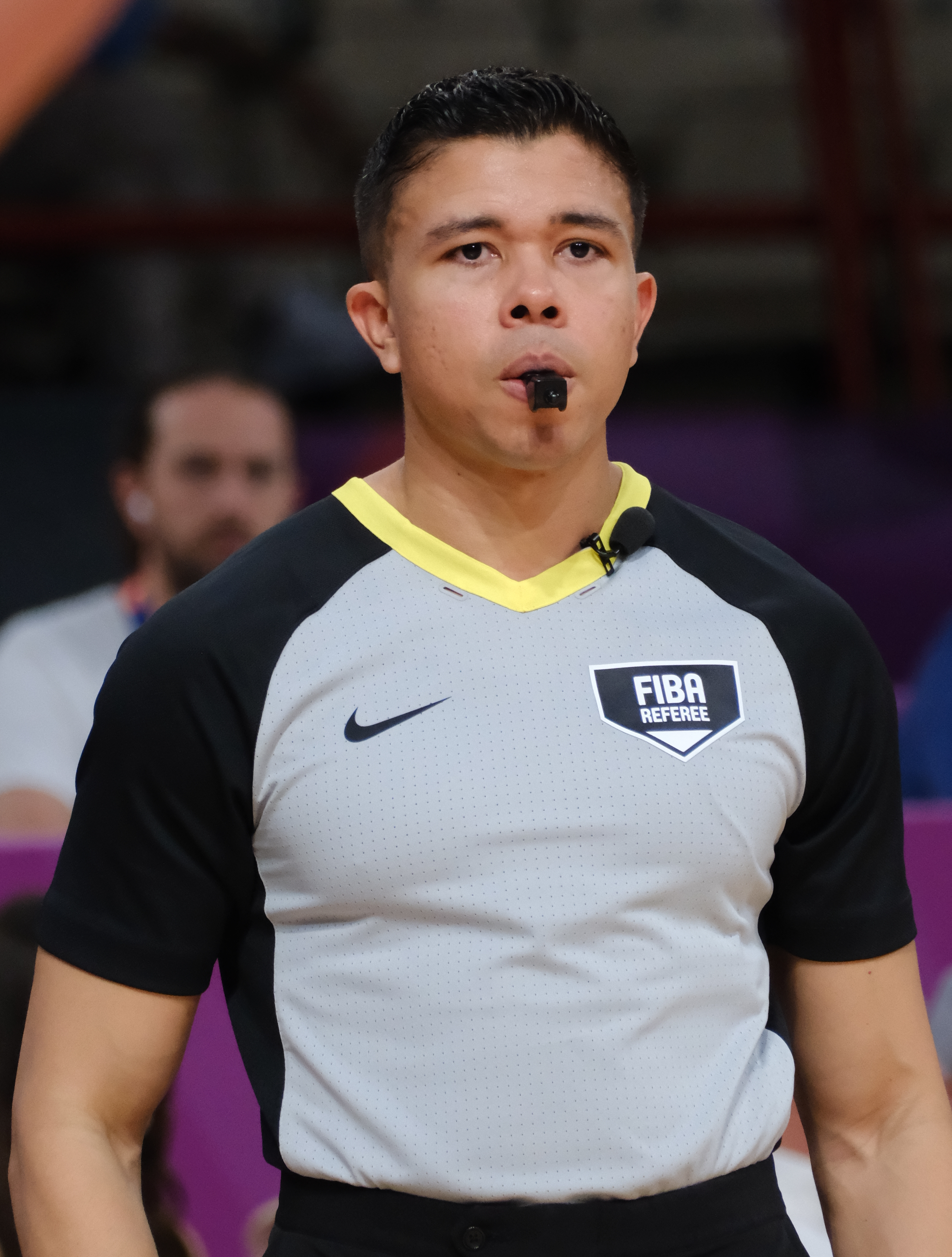
- Anaya in 2025

Personal information
- Born: 5 November 1991 (age 34) Panama

Julio César Anaya Freile (born 5 November 1991) is a Panamanian basketball referee licensed by the International Basketball Federation (FIBA). He officiated the men's gold medal game at the 2024 Summer Olympics in Paris. He is the second Panamanian to referee a senior FIBA Basketball World Cup.

== Early life and career ==
As a child Anaya was interested in volleyball before switching to basketball. He began officiating at age 11 as a table official in local games at the Parque Lefevre gym in Panama City before transitioning to refereeing mini basketball.

At 17 he obtained his national license. At 19 he received his FIBA license in April 2011 at a certification clinic in the Cayman Islands, making him one of the youngest FIBA-licensed referees in the world at the time. Anaya studied maritime and port engineering at the Universidad Tecnológica de Panamá, though he never practiced the profession.

In 2013, Anaya's nomination to the 2013 FIBA Under-19 World Championship was withdrawn after the Panamanian Basketball Federation (FEPABA) was suspended by FIBA over governance issues.

== International Career ==
Anaya has refereed multiple high-profile FIBA basketball tournaments and participated in the NBA Summer League in 2023.

Among his most notable assignments are the 2019 FIBA Basketball World Cup, the 2022 FIBA Women's Basketball World Cup, the 2023 FIBA Basketball World Cup, and 2024 Summer Olympics. At the 2022 Women's World Cup, he was assigned to the final between the United States and China. The following year, he officiated the third-place game at the men's World Cup. At Paris 2024, Anaya refereed the men's gold medal game between the United States and France. In 2026 he was selected as an official for the 2026 FIBA Women's Basketball World Cup and was assigned as the crew chief for the final between the United States and France.

Since September 2024, Anaya has officiated games in Portugal's Liga Portuguesa de Basquetebol and contributed to referee training programs.

Anaya has officiated at two Basketball Champions League (BCL) Final Fours, in 2025 and 2026, refereeing the final both years.
