= 1998 FIBA World Championship for Women =

13th FIBA World Championship for Women

Tournament details
- Host country: Germany
- Dates: May 26 – June 7
- Teams: 16 (from 5 federations)
- Venues: 7 (in 7 host cities)

Final positions
- Champions: United States (6th title)

Tournament statistics
- Top scorer: (Brazil) Arcain (20.2)
- Top rebounds: (Argentina) Ferazzoli (11.8)
- Top assists: (South Korea) Chun (6.2)
- PPG (Team): Japan (86.0)
- RPG (Team): United States (39.8)
- APG (Team): China (19.3)

Official website
- 1998 FIBA World Championship for Women

The 1998 FIBA Women's World Championship (German: 1998 FIBA Frauen-Weltmeisterschaft) was hosted by Germany from May 26 to June 7, 1998. The USA won the tournament, defeating Russia 71-65 in the final.

== Venues ==
- Münster
- Wuppertal
- Rotenburg/Fulda
- Karlsruhe
- Dessau
- Bremen
- Berlin

== Competing nations ==
Group A	Group B	Group C	Group D
Russia	United States	Australia	Brazil
Spain	Lithuania	Cuba	Slovakia
China	Japan	Germany	Hungary
Argentina	Senegal	DR Congo	South Korea

== Preliminary round ==
=== Group A ===
Pos	Team	Pld	W	L	PF	PA	PD	Pts	Qualification
1	Russia	3	3	0	249	154	+95	6	Advanced to the second round
2	Spain	3	2	1	206	172	+34	5	Advanced to the second round
3	China	3	1	2	203	201	+2	4	Advanced to the second round
4	Argentina	3	0	3	136	267	−131	3	Qualified for the 13–16th place playoff

Source: Results

=== Group B ===
Pos	Team	Pld	W	L	PF	PA	PD	Pts	Qualification
1	United States	3	3	0	259	198	+61	6	Advanced to the second round
2	Japan	3	2	1	265	255	+10	5	Advanced to the second round
3	Lithuania	3	1	2	237	243	−6	4	Advanced to the second round
4	Senegal	3	0	3	167	232	−65	3	Qualified for the 13–16th place playoff

Source: Results

=== Group C ===
Pos	Team	Pld	W	L	PF	PA	PD	Pts	Qualification
1	Australia	3	3	0	279	198	+81	6	Advanced to the second round
2	Cuba	3	2	1	276	237	+39	5	Advanced to the second round
3	Germany (H)	3	1	2	241	219	+22	4	Advanced to the second round
4	DR Congo	3	0	3	142	284	−142	3	Qualified for the 13–16th place playoff

Source: Results
(H) Hosts

=== Group D ===
Pos	Team	Pld	W	L	PF	PA	PD	Pts	Qualification
1	Brazil	3	3	0	224	203	+21	6	Advanced to the second round
2	Slovakia	3	2	1	179	166	+13	5	Advanced to the second round
3	Hungary	3	1	2	193	198	−5	4	Advanced to the second round
4	South Korea	3	0	3	186	215	−29	3	Qualified for the 13–16th place playoff

Source: Results

== Second round ==
Scores and results from the first round shall be carried over to the second round.

=== Group E ===
Pos	Team	Pld	W	L	PF	PA	PD	Pts	Qualification
1	United States	5	5	0	427	332	+95	10	Advanced to the quarter-finals
2	Russia	5	4	1	366	346	+20	9	Advanced to the quarter-finals
3	Lithuania	5	2	3	345	384	−39	7 (Note: Lithuania 66–63 Spain)	Advanced to the quarter-finals
4	Spain	5	2	3	370	330	+40	7	Advanced to the quarter-finals
5	China	5	1	4	325	377	−52	6 (Note: China 94–93 Japan)	Qualified for the 9–12th place playoff
6	Japan	5	1	4	419	483	−64	6	Qualified for the 9–12th place playoff

Source: Results

=== Group F ===
Pos	Team	Pld	W	L	PF	PA	PD	Pts	Qualification
1	Australia	5	5	0	430	353	+77	10	Advanced to the quarter-finals
2	Brazil	5	4	1	389	366	+23	9	Advanced to the quarter-finals
3	Cuba	5	3	2	446	433	+13	8	Advanced to the quarter-finals
4	Slovakia	5	2	3	308	337	−29	7	Advanced to the quarter-finals
5	Germany (H)	5	1	4	358	388	−30	6	Qualified for the 9–12th place playoff
6	Hungary	5	0	5	346	400	−54	5	Qualified for the 9–12th place playoff

Source: Results
(H) Hosts

== Classification stage ==
=== 13–16th place playoffs ===
Classification Semifinals
May 30
Senegal	67
Argentina	59
May 30
South Korea	97
DR Congo	60

13th place match
May 31
Senegal	70
South Korea	74
15th place match
May 31
Argentina	73
DR Congo	52

=== 9–12th place playoffs ===
Classification Semifinals
June 4
China	93
Hungary (OT)	95
June 4
Japan	88
Germany	71

Ninth place match
June 5
Hungary	82
Japan	108
Eleventh place match
June 5
China	60
Germany	90

== Final round ==
=== Bracket ===
5th place match
E4	Spain	70
E3	Lithuania	59
7th place match
F3	Cuba (OT)	83
F4	Slovakia	81

5th–8th place semi-finals
F3	Cuba	63
E4	Spain	80
E3	Lithuania	66
F4	Slovakia	58

Quarter-finals
E2	Russia	85
F3	Cuba	78
E4	Spain	54
F1	Australia	87
E3	Lithuania	70
F2	Brazil	72
E1	United States	89
F4	Slovakia	62

Semifinals
E2	Russia	82
F1	Australia	76
F2	Brazil	79
E1	United States	93

Final
E2	Russia	65
E1	United States	71
Bronze medal match
F1	Australia	72
F2	Brazil	67

=== Quarterfinals ===
4 June 1998
18:00

Brazil	72–70	Lithuania
Scoring by half: 39–33, 33–37

4 June 1998
20:00

Slovakia	62–89	United States
Scoring by half: 35–41, 27–48

5 June 1998
18:00

Russia	85–78	Cuba
Scoring by half: 47–33, 38–45

5 June 1998
20:00

Spain	54–87	Australia
Scoring by half: 25–48, 29–39

== Final standings ==
#	Team	W–L
	United States	9–0
	Russia	7–2
	Australia	8–1
4	Brazil	6–3
5	Spain	5–4
6	Lithuania	4–5
7	Cuba	5–4
8	Slovakia	3–6
9	Japan	4–4
10	Hungary	2–6
11	Germany	3–5
12	China	2–6
13	South Korea	2–3
14	Senegal	1–4
15	Argentina	1–4
16	DR Congo	0–5

== Awards ==
1998 World Championship winner

United States
Sixth title
