= Max-Schmeling-Halle =

Multi-purpose arena in Berlin, Germany

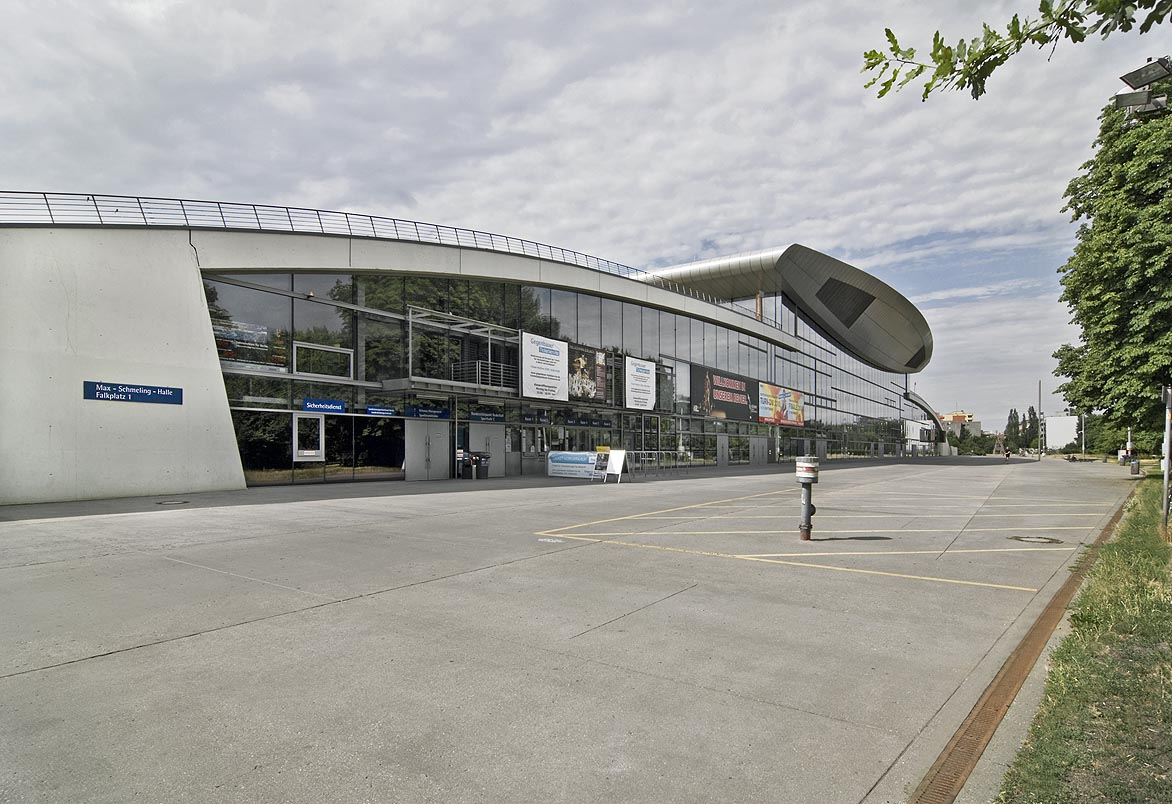
- Interactive map of Max-Schmeling-Halle
- Location: Friedrich-Ludwig-Jahn-Sportpark, Prenzlauer Berg, Berlin, Germany
- Coordinates: 52°32′41″N 13°24′15″E
- Operator: Velomax Berlin Hallenbetriebs GmbH
- Capacity: 8,500 (basketball, handball); 10,000 (2007 World Men's Handball Championship); 9,200 (Volleyball)

Construction
- Groundbreaking: 6 July 1994
- Opened: 1996
- Architects: Jörg Joppien; Albert Dietz; Annette Maud-Joppien

Tenants
- Füchse Berlin HBC (HBL) (2005–present); ALBA Berlin (BBL) (1996–2008); Berlin Recycling Volleys (DVL)

Max-Schmeling-Halle is a multi-purpose arena, in Berlin, Germany, named after the famous German boxer Max Schmeling. Apart from Uber Arena and the Velodrom, it is one of Berlin's biggest indoor sports arenas and holds from 8,861 people, up to 12,000 people.

The opening ceremony took place on 14 December 1996 in the presence of Max Schmeling.

== Location ==
The Max-Schmeling-Halle is situated in the former border area of Berlin, near the Mauerpark and directly next to the Friedrich-Ludwig-Jahn-Sportpark. It is situated at the Falkplatz, in the district Prenzlauer Berg (borough Pankow).

== Use ==
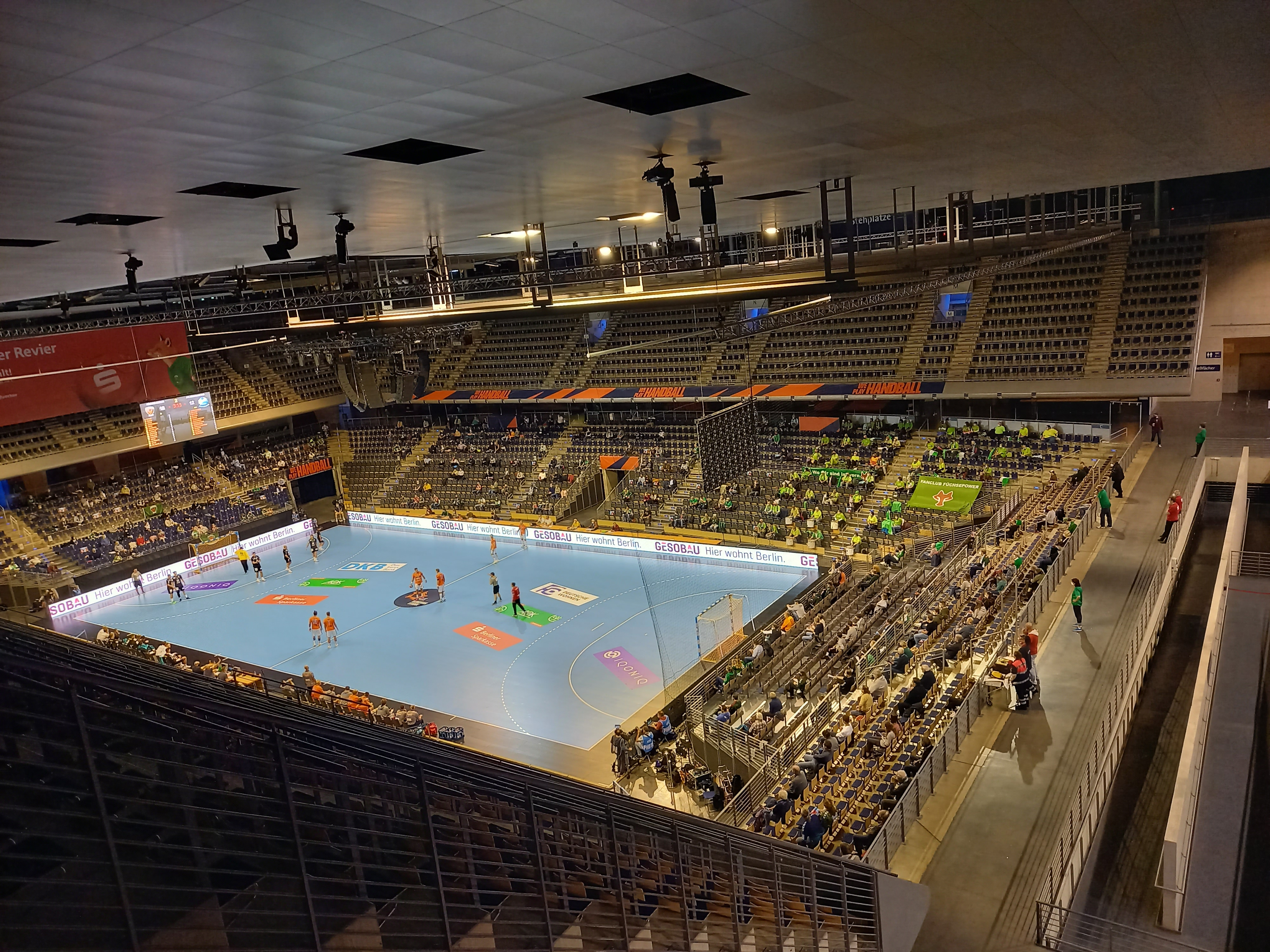
The arena hosting team handball in October 2020

Planned for the 2000 Summer Olympics as a pure box gym, it was rebuilt (after the games were awarded to Sydney as the venue) to a multi-functional gym and is now primarily used for boxing and team handball and is the home arena of Füchse Berlin HBC and the Berlin Mini Basketball Tournament (berliner-mini-turnier.de).

Madonna performed 4 sell out concerts in the arena during her Drowned World Tour in June 2001.

On 9 May 2001, Irish vocal pop band Westlife held a concert for their Where Dreams Come True Tour supporting their album Coast to Coast.

World Wrestling Entertainment was there twice, in April 2005 and 2006.

On December 11 2015, Motörhead played their last concert at Max-Schmeling-Halle before Lemmy died 17 days later on 28 December.

The 2019 CEV Champions League Grand Final was held at the arena and the next edition, the 2020 Finals was scheduled to be held at the arena as well, before being canceled to PalaOlimpia at Verona, Italy, as the 2021 Finals. It will host the group phase matches at the 2026 FIBA Women's Basketball World Cup.

== See also ==
- List of indoor arenas in Germany

Preceded by Yad Eliyahu Sports Hall; Tel Aviv	FIBA Euro All star game Venue; 1998	Succeeded by Olimpiisky Arena; Moscow
Preceded by Pionir Hall; Belgrade	European Women's Volleyball Championship; Final Venue; 2013	Succeeded by Ahoy; Rotterdam
Preceded by Başkent Volleyball Hall (Turkey) Ankara	CEV Champions League; Final Venue; 2015	Succeeded by Kraków Arena (Poland) Kraków
Preceded by Basket-Hall (Russia) Kazan	CEV Champions League; Final Venue; 2019	Succeeded by PalaOlimpia (Italy) Verona
