= Yohan Rosso =

French basketball referee

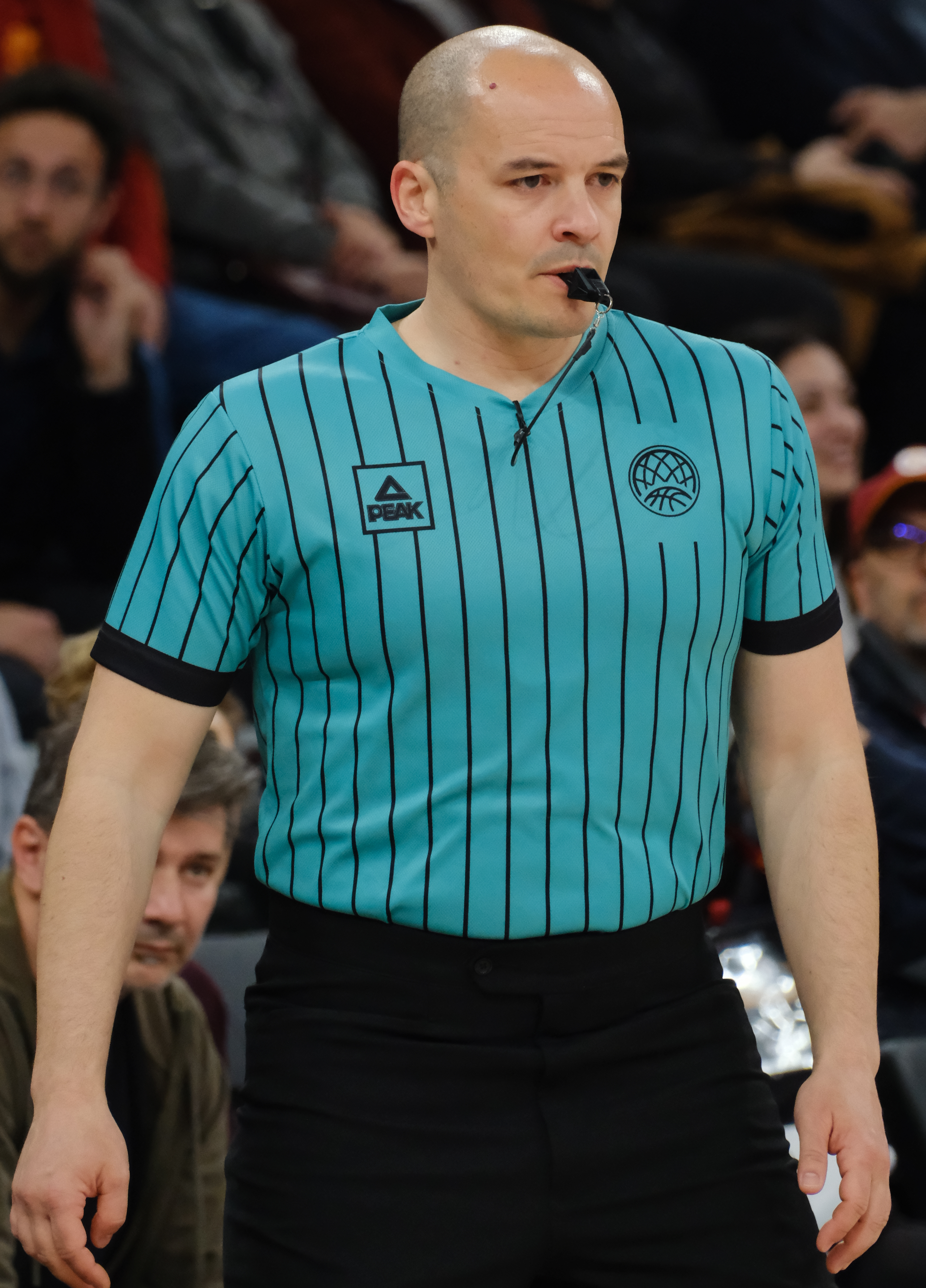
- Yohan Rosso in 2025

Personal information
- Born: 3 June 1982 (age 44)

Yohan Rosso (born in 1982) is a French international basketball referee licensed by FIBA, who has officiated at the sport's highest levels, including the Olympic Games, the FIBA World Cup, EuroBasket competitions and major European club competitions.

== Career ==
Rosso became a FIBA international referee in 2015, following success at the FIBA Europe examinations under the auspices of the French Basketball Federation. He has been appointed to multiple major FIBA events. He has also participated in the NBA Summer League in the summer of 2025.

Rosso officiated the 2018 FIBA Women's Basketball World Cup final in Tenerife and the 2019 FIBA Basketball World Cup final in Beijing (Spain vs. Argentina). At the Tokyo 2020 Olympic Games (held in 2021), Rosso was included on FIBA's list of appointed officials for the men's and women's basketball tournaments. During the Paris 2024 Olympic Basketball Tournament, Rosso refereed multiple high-profile games, including the 3rd place game between Germany and Serbia, the group-stage game between Serbia and the United States and the quarter-final between Serbia and Australia.

In European club competitions, Rosso has been a frequent appointee to later-round fixtures. FIBA documented his participation among the season's selected referees and commissioners across the 2024–25 European competitions. The French federation has also profiled his elite-level assignments and career path, highlighting his rise from French domestic basketball to global events.

In September 2025, he officiated the gold medal game of EuroBasket 2025 between Germany and Turkey in Riga. He was nominated for the 2026 FIBA Women's Basketball World Cup.

== Main assignments ==
- Referee at the final of the 2018 FIBA Women's Basketball World Cup (Tenerife).
- Referee at the final of the 2019 FIBA Basketball World Cup (Beijing).
- Official at the Tokyo 2020 Olympic Basketball Tournaments (men's/women's).
- Official at the Paris 2024 Olympic Basketball Tournament (e.g., Serbia–USA group stage; Serbia–Australia quarter-final).
- Referee at the gold medal game of the EuroBasket 2025 (Riga)
- Official at the 2026 Women's Basketball World Cup (Germany)

== Personal life ==
Rosso lives permanently in Paris. He is married to former basketball referee, Christina Manoli, and they have together two children.
