= Germany women's national basketball team =

National team

Germany
- FIBA ranking: 11 ▲1 (18 March 2026)
- Joined FIBA: 1954
- FIBA zone: FIBA Europe
- National federation: Deutscher Basketball Bund
- Coach: Olaf Lange

Olympic Games
- Appearances: 1

World Cup
- Appearances: 2

EuroBasket
- Appearances: 17
- Medals: (bronze) Bronze: (1997)
Home	Away

The Germany women's national basketball team is the women's basketball team that represents Germany in international competitions. It is governed by the German Basketball Federation (DBB).

== Competitive record ==
=== Olympic Games ===
Olympic Games
Year	Position	Pld	W	L
(Canada) 1976	Did not enter			
(Soviet Union) 1980	Did not enter			
(United States) 1984	Did not enter			
(South Korea) 1988	Did not qualify			
(Spain) 1992	Did not qualify			
(United States) 1996	Did not qualify			
(Australia) 2000	Did not qualify			
(Greece) 2004	Did not qualify			
(China) 2008	Did not qualify			
(United Kingdom) 2012	Did not qualify			
(Brazil) 2016	Did not qualify			
(Japan) 2020	Did not qualify			
(France) 2024	7th	4	2	2
(United States) 2028	To be determined			
Total	1/10	4	2	2

=== FIBA Women's World Cup ===
Women's World Cup
Year	Position	Pld	W	L
(Chile) 1953	Did not enter			
(Brazil) 1957	Did not enter			
(Soviet Union) 1959	Did not enter			
(Peru) 1964	Did not enter			
(Czechoslovakia) 1967	Did not enter			
(Brazil) 1971	Did not enter			
(Colombia) 1975	Did not enter			
(South Korea) 1979	Did not enter			
(Brazil) 1983	Did not enter			
(Soviet Union) 1986	Did not enter			
(Malaysia) 1990	Did not enter			
(Australia) 1994	Did not enter			
(Germany) 1998	11th	8	3	5
(China) 2002	Did not qualify			
(Brazil) 2006	Did not qualify			
(Czech Republic) 2010	Did not qualify			
(Turkey) 2014	Did not qualify			
(Spain) 2018	Did not qualify			
(Australia) 2022	Did not qualify			
(Germany) 2026	4th	7	4	3
(Japan) 2030	To be determined			
Total	2/21	15	7	8

=== EuroBasket Women ===
EuroBasket Women
Year	Position	Pld	W	L
(Italy) 1938	Did not enter			
(Hungary) 1950	Did not enter			
(Soviet Union) 1952	Did not enter			
(Socialist Federal Republic of Yugoslavia) 1954	9th	5	1	4
(Czechoslovakia) 1956	15th	7	2	5
(Poland) 1958				
(Bulgaria) 1960
(France) 1962	Did not qualify			
(Hungary) 1964	Did not qualify			
(Romania) 1966	12th	7	0	7
(Italy) 1968	13th	8	0	8
(Netherlands) 1970	Did not qualify			
(Bulgaria) 1972	Did not qualify			
(Italy) 1974	10th	7	3	4
(France) 1976	13th	10	3	7
(Poland) 1978	12th	7	2	5
(Socialist Federal Republic of Yugoslavia) 1980	Did not qualify			
(Italy) 1981	10th	7	3	4
(Hungary) 1983	12th	7	1	6
(Italy) 1985	Did not qualify			
(Spain) 1987	Did not qualify			
(Bulgaria) 1989	Did not qualify			
(Israel) 1991	Did not qualify			
(Italy) 1993	Did not qualify			
(Czech Republic) 1995	14th	6	0	6
(Hungary) 1997	Bronze medal	8	5	3
(Poland) 1999	12th	5	1	4
(France) 2001	Did not qualify			
(Greece) 2003	Did not qualify			
(Turkey) 2005	11th	7	1	6
(Italy) 2007	11th	8	2	6
(Latvia) 2009	Did not qualify			
(Poland) 2011	13th	3	0	3
(France) 2013	Did not qualify			
(Hungary) (Romania) 2015	Did not qualify			
(Czech Republic) 2017	Did not qualify			
(Latvia) (Serbia) 2019	Did not qualify			
(France) (Spain) 2021	Did not qualify			
(Israel) (Slovenia) 2023	6th	6	4	2
(Czech Republic) (Germany) (Greece) (Italy) 2025	5th	6	4	2
(Belgium) (Finland) (Sweden) (Lithuania) 2027	To be determined			
Total	Bronze medal	49	17	32

== Current roster ==
Roster for 2026 FIBA Women's Basketball World Cup.

Germany women's national basketball team roster
Players
Coaches

Pos.	No.	Name	Age – Date of birth	Height	Club	Ctr.
PG	1	Alexis Peterson	31 – 20 June 1995	1.70 m (5 ft 7 in)	Valencia Basket	(Spain)
G	3	Alexandra Wilke	29 – 29 September 1996	1.76 m (5 ft 9 in)	Rutronik Stars Keltern	(Germany)
PF	8	Nyara Sabally	26 – 26 February 2000	1.93 m (6 ft 4 in)	Toronto Tempo	(Canada)
SF	9	Emma Eichmeyer	26 – 25 February 2000	1.83 m (6 ft 0 in)	Saarlouis Royals	(Canada)
SG	13	Leonie Fiebich	26 – 10 January 2000	1.92 m (6 ft 4 in)	New York Liberty	(United States)
C	15	Luisa Geiselsöder	26 – 10 February 2000	1.93 m (6 ft 4 in)	Portland Fire	(United States)
PG	19	Britta Daub	27 – 20 January 1999	1.77 m (5 ft 10 in)	Eisvögel USC Freiburg	(Germany)
PF	20	Frieda Bühner	22 – 28 May 2004	1.87 m (6 ft 2 in)	Portland Fire	(United States)
PF	21	Marie Gülich (C)	32 – 28 May 1994	1.95 m (6 ft 5 in)	Townsville Fire	(Australia)
SF	22	Emily Bessoir	24 – 19 November 2001	1.94 m (6 ft 4 in)	CB Jairis	(Spain)
PG	24	Lina Sontag	22 – 24 November 2003	1.91 m (6 ft 3 in)	AE Sedis Bàsquet	(Spain)
PG	25	Clara Bielefeld	19 – 28 August 2007	1.95 m (6 ft 5 in)	TCU Horned Frogs	(United States)

Head coach

- (Germany) Olaf Lange

Assistant coach(es)

- (Germany) Julie Barennes
- (Germany) Stefan Möller
- (Germany) Constanze Wegner

Legend

- (C) Team captain
- Club – describes last
  club before the tournament
- Age – describes age
  on 4 September 2026

== See also ==
- East Germany women's national basketball team
- Germany women's national under-19 basketball team
- Germany women's national under-17 basketball team
- Germany women's national 3x3 team
