= Dominique Malonga (basketball) =

French basketball player (born 2005)

- Malonga with the France in 2026

No. 14 – Seattle Storm
- Position: Center
- League: WNBA

Personal information
- Born: 16 November 2005 (age 20) Yaoundé, Cameroon
- Listed height: 6 ft 6 in (1.98 m)

Career information
- WNBA draft: 2025: 1st round, 2nd overall pick
- Drafted by: Seattle Storm
- Playing career: 2021–present

Career history
- 2021–2025: ASVEL Féminin
- 2023–2024: Tarbes GB
- 2025–present: Seattle Storm
- 2026–present: Breeze

Career highlights
- WNBA All-Star (2026); WNBA All-Rookie Team (2025)
- Stats at Basketball Reference
Medals
Women's basketball
Representing (France) France
Olympic Games
Silver medal – second place	2024 Paris	Team
FIBA World Cup
Silver medal – second place	2026 Germany
FIBA Under-17 World Cup
Bronze medal – third place	2022 Hungary	Team

Dominique Malonga (born 16 November 2005) is a French professional basketball player for the Seattle Storm of the Women's National Basketball Association (WNBA) and for the Breeze of Unrivaled. She was selected second overall by the Storm in the 2025 WNBA draft. She also plays for the France national team. She was the youngest member of the team at the 2024 Summer Olympics and won a silver medal.

== Early life ==
Malonga was born in Yaoundé, and is the daughter of Thalance Malonga and Agathe N'Nindjem-Yolemp. Both of her parents are former basketball players, while her father is currently a doctor. She is the fourth of six children.

Malonga lived in France while her mother was playing professionally and often went back and forth to Cameroon. From 2012 to 2016 the family lived in Cameroon before moving back to France.

== Professional career ==
=== France ===
On 30 June 2021, Malonga signed with ASVEL Féminin of the Ligue Féminine de Basketball (LFB). At age 16 she went viral for dunking. During the 2021–22 season, in her first season with the club, she averaged six points and five rebounds in seven games. During the 2022–23 season she missed six weeks due to injury and averaged 6.4 points and 3.3 rebounds in seven games.

On 17 August 2023, she was loaned to Tarbes Gespe Bigorre of the LFB for the 2023–24 season. During her first season with Tarbes Gespe Bigorre she averaged 11.9 points, 8.9 rebounds and 1.4 blocks in 25 games.

Malonga returned to ASVEL for the 2024–25 season. On 31 October 2024, in a 115–54 win over Apollon Limassol in the 2024–25 EuroCup, Malonga made a dunk and was initially believed to be the first French woman to dunk in an official game. It was later reported—and eventually confirmed through video footage—that 17-year-old Alicia Tournebize had accomplished the feat a few weeks earlier in a French fourth division game.

=== Turkey ===
In March 2025, Malonga signed with Fenerbahçe of the Turkish Super League. Malonga missed the start of the 2025–26 season, and in October 2025 she announced that she had not yet traveled to Turkey due to wrist surgery for an injury she sustained toward the end of the 2025 WNBA season. On 20 October 2025, the team announced that Malonga had unilaterally terminated her contract without a just cause.

=== WNBA ===
==== 2025 ====
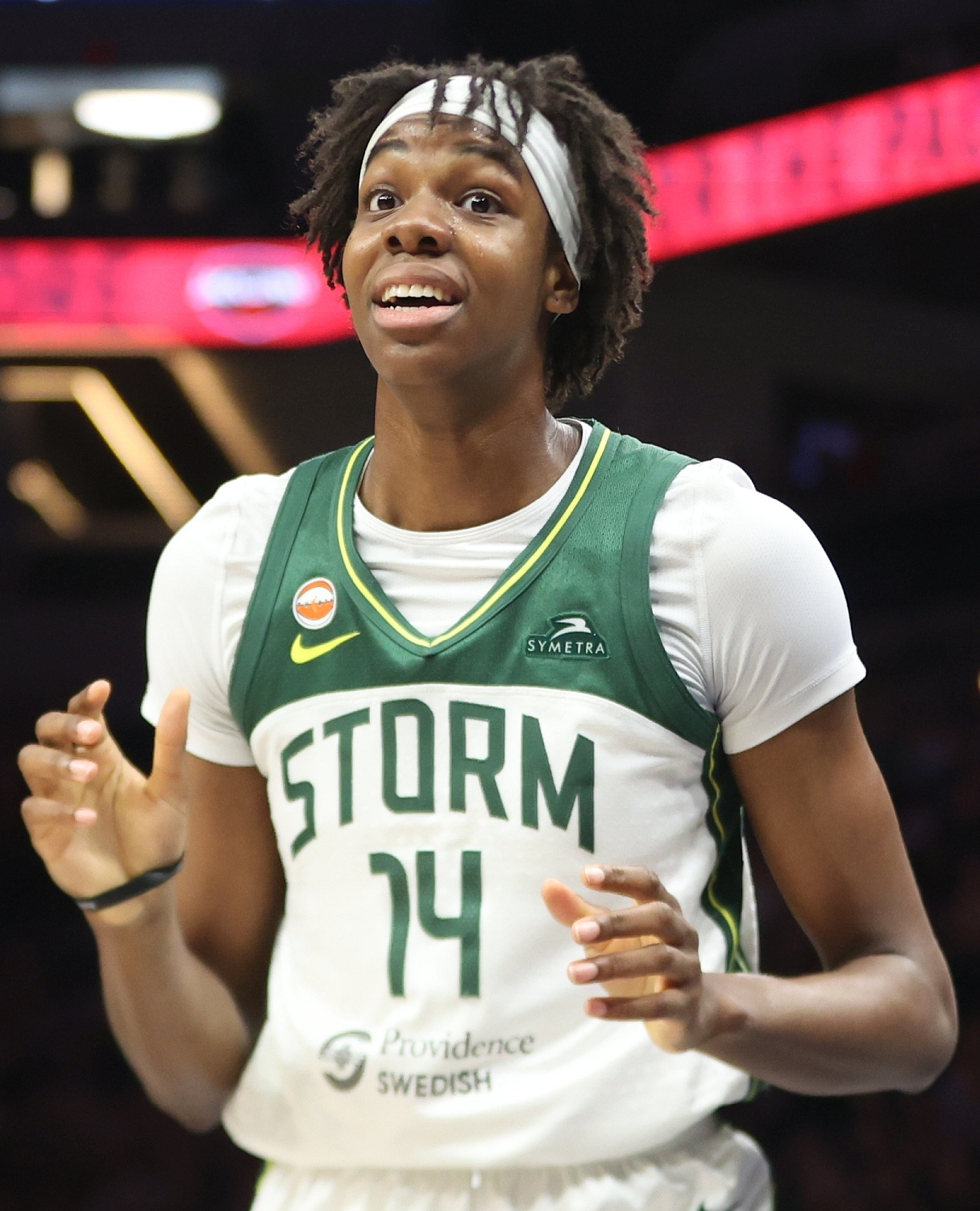
Malonga with the Seattle Storm in 2026

On 14 April 2025, Malonga was drafted second overall by the Seattle Storm in the 2025 WNBA draft. She made her WNBA debut on 17 May 2025 in a 59–81 loss to the Phoenix Mercury, scoring two points in nine minutes off the bench. At 19 years and 184 days old, she became the youngest player in Storm history and the third-youngest in WNBA history to play in a game. She averaged only 8.8 minutes over the first 22 games of the season before the 2025 WNBA All-Star Game, but her role expanded significantly as the season progressed. In the 20 games following the break, she averaged 11.4 points, 6.7 rebounds, and 20.3 minutes per game. On 25 July, in a 95–57 win over the Chicago Sky, she recorded 14 points and 10 rebounds for a double-double. At 19 years and 250 days, she became the youngest player ever to post a double-double and to reach the century mark for points. On 8 August, in an 86–90 loss to the Las Vegas Aces, she scored a then career-high 22 points and 12 rebounds in 24 minutes off the bench. The Storm finished the regular season in 7th place and faced the second-seeded Aces in the playoffs. In Game 1 of the 2025 WNBA playoffs, she recorded 12 points and 11 rebounds in 23 minutes, becoming the second-youngest player to make her WNBA postseason debut. In Game 2, she posted another double-double with 11 points, 10 rebounds, three assists, and two blocks in 22 minutes, including a game-deciding three-point play with 31 seconds remaining. The Storm ultimately lost the winner-take-all Game 3, ending their playoff run. Following the season, she was named to the WNBA All-Rookie Team.

==== 2026 ====
During the 2026 WNBA season, Malonga played three games to start the season, before entering concussion protocol on 14 May 2026. She missed the next eight games, and made her return on 6 June against the Minnesota Lynx and scored seven points in 14 minutes off the bench. This marked the first time Malonga and the Storm's 2026 WNBA draft first-round selection, Awa Fam, saw action together. On 17 June, she scored a then career-high 28 points, along with 11 rebounds, in an 89–94 loss to the Portland Fire. On 22 June, she scored a career-high 37 points and season-high 12 rebounds in a 110–112 overtime loss to the Dallas Wings. She became the youngest player in WNBA history to record a 30-point game, and the first under 21 years old. On 25 June, in a 99–88 win over the New York Liberty, she recorded 20 points and 10 rebounds, and snapped an 11-game losing streak for the Storm. She became the youngest player in WNBA history to reach both 500 career points and 200 defensive rebounds.

=== Unrivaled ===
On 5 November 2025, Malonga was drafted by Breeze BC for the 2026 Unrivaled season.

== National team career ==
Malonga made her international debut for France at the 2021 FIBA U16 European Challengers where she averaged 19.8 points, 9.8 rebounds, 1.2 steals and 2.8 blocks per game to help France qualify for the 2022 FIBA Under-17 World Cup.

During the 2022 FIBA Under-17 World Cup she averaged a double-double of 18 points and ten rebounds per game and helped France win a bronze medal. During the bronze medal game against Canada she scored 28 points and 17 rebounds. Following the tournament she was named to the all-tournament team. She finished the tournament with the best efficiency rating of 22.4, ranked second in scoring and fourth in rebounds.

During the 2024 FIBA Olympic Qualifying Tournament she averaged nine points and 3.3 rebounds in three games, as France finished the tournament undefeated. On 8 June 2024, she was named to France's roster to compete at the 2024 Summer Olympics. At 18 years old, she was the youngest member on the team. During the Olympic tournament, she played in all three group games and the gold medal game. She averaged 7.1 minutes, 2.8 points, 2.0 rebounds, and 0.8 blocks per game as the French team won a silver medal.

On 12 May 2025, she announced that she would not participate in EuroBasket 2025, choosing instead to focus on her rookie WNBA season.

Malonga returned to the team for the 2026 FIBA World Cup Qualifying Tournament. On 11 March 2026, in a 115–66 win over the Philippines, she became the first woman to dunk for France at senior level.

== Personal life ==
Malonga is currently attending Southern New Hampshire University for a computer science degree online. She enjoys playing the piano in her free time and often uses it to decompress.

== Career statistics ==
Legend
GP	Games played	GS	Games started	MPG	Minutes per game	FG%	Field goal percentage
3P%	3-point field goal percentage	FT%	Free throw percentage	RPG	Rebounds per game	APG	Assists per game
SPG	Steals per game	BPG	Blocks per game	TO	Turnovers per game	PPG	Points per game
**Bold**	Career high	°	League leader	‡	WNBA record

=== WNBA ===
==== Regular season ====
Stats current as of end of 2026 season

WNBA regular season statistics
Year	Team	GP	GS	MPG	FG%	3P%	FT%	RPG	APG	SPG	BPG	TO	PPG
2025	Seattle	42	0	14.3	.551	.222	.569	4.6	0.9	0.4	0.7	1.1	7.7
2026	Seattle	35	34	26.4	.488	.278	.738	8.8	1.7	1.0	1.4	2.7	17.1
**Career**	2 years, 1 team	77	34	19.8	.510	.268	.693	6.5	1.2	0.7	1.0	1.8	12.0

==== Playoffs ====
WNBA playoff statistics
Year	Team	GP	GS	MPG	FG%	3P%	FT%	RPG	APG	SPG	BPG	TO	PPG
2025	Seattle	3	0	22.7	.391	1.000	.857	8.7	1.3	0.7	1.7	1.0	8.7
**Career**	1 year, 1 team	3	0	22.7	.391	1.000	.857	8.7	1.3	0.7	1.7	1.0	8.7

== Orders ==
- Chevalier in the French Order of Merit: 2024
