= Wojciech Liszka =

Polish basketball referee (born 1980)

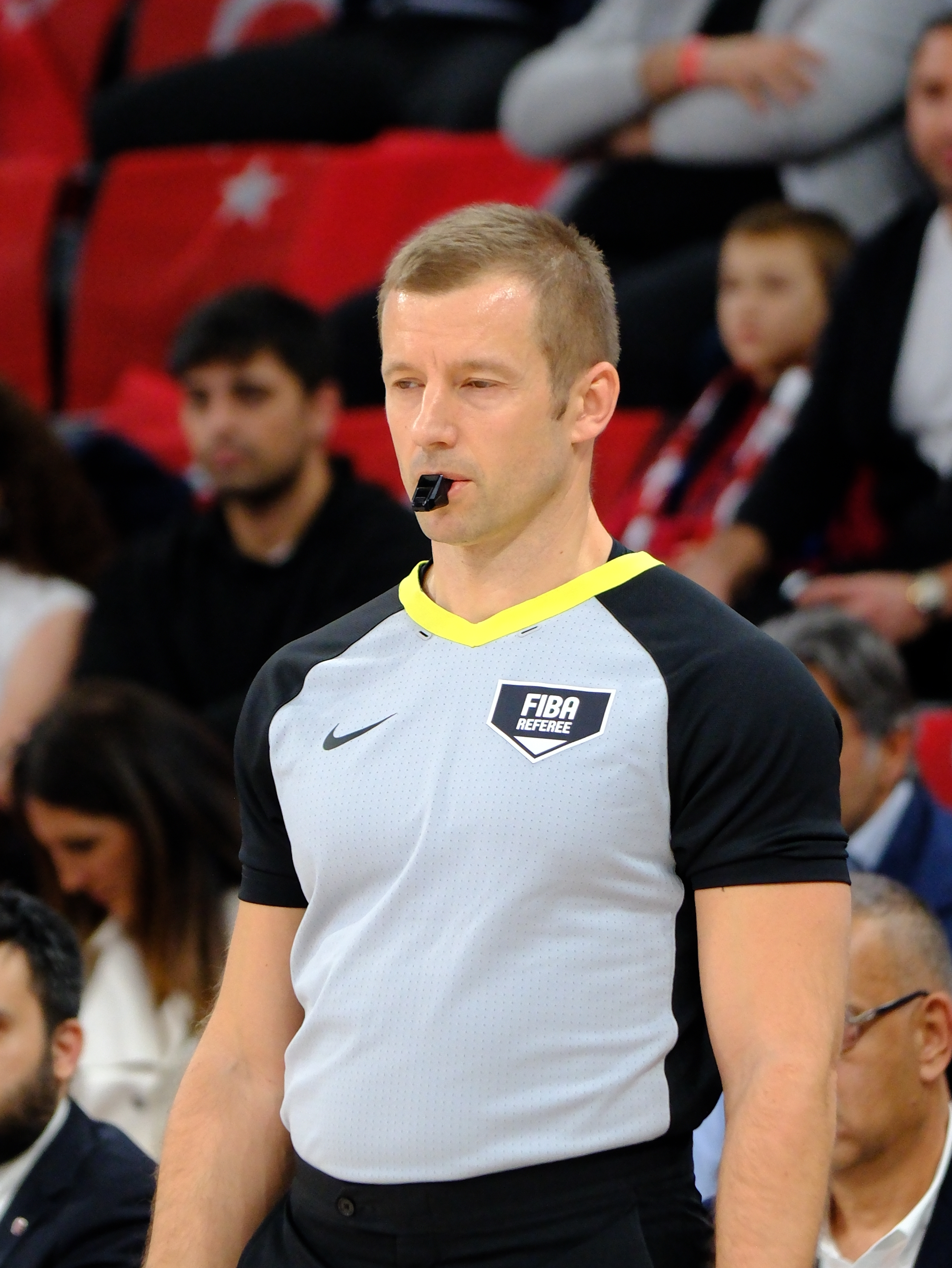
- Liszka in 2025

Personal information
- Born: 25 August 1980 (age 46) Szczecin, Poland

Wojciech Liszka (born 25 August 1980) is a Polish basketball referee licensed by the International Basketball Federation (FIBA). He officiated the men's gold medal game at the 2024 Summer Olympics in Paris. He has been a FIBA referee since 2012, and has since refereed over 500 international games and 18 major FIBA finals.

== Early life and career ==
Liszka was born in Szczecin, Poland. As a secondary school student he began refereeing basketball games between classes, before formally enrolling in a referee course at age 16.

In Szczecin, Liszka formed a refereeing group with friends, including Piotr Pastusiak, who would go on to referee the women's gold medal game at the 2016 Summer Olympics in Rio de Janeiro. The group was mentored by Jerzy Buczkowski, described by Liszka as the only trainer in Poland to produce two Olympic referees.

It took Liszka 12 years after beginning refereeing to reach the Polish Basketball League (PLK), the top level basketball league in the country. After four years refereeing the PLK, in April 2012, he received his FIBA refereeing license. Liszka has officiated top level basketball leagues in Poland for over 16 years. After attending a referee camp in Montenegro hosted by referees that attended the Rio Olympic Games, Liszka was nominated for the 2017 FIBA Under-19 Basketball World Cup.

== International career ==
Liszka has refereed the finals for 18 major international FIBA tournaments, working games on every continent. Major tournament assignments include the Olympic final in 2024 and three Basketball Champions League (BCL) finals in 2022, 2024, and 2025. The European North Basketball League (ENBL) described him as "one of the top referees in Europe."

At the 2024 Summer Olympic Games in Paris, Liszka was initially selected from a pool of 40 referees. He refereed eight games, five in the group stage, and three men's games in the knockout stage. He additionally served as the fourth referee for one game. He refereed the gold medal game between France and the United States on 10 August 2024.

Following the Olympics, Liszka refereed the 2024–25 Basketball Champions League final and the 2024–25 FIBA Europe Cup final. He was also selected for the EuroBasket 2025 referee panel. Liszka has indicated he does not wish to pursue a career in the NBA.
