= Basketball at the 1980 Summer Olympics – Women's team rosters =

Olympic basketball rosters

Six women's teams competed in basketball at the 1980 Summer Olympics.

== Bulgaria ==
The following players represented Bulgaria:

- Nadka Golcheva
- Penka Metodieva
- Petkana Makaveeva
- Snezhana Mikhaylova
- Krasimira Bogdanova
- Diana Dilova-Braynova
- Penka Stoyanova
- Vanya Dermendzhieva
- Angelina Mikhaylova
- Evladiya Slavcheva-Stefanova
- Kostadinka Radkova
- Silviya Germanova

== Cuba ==
The following players represented Cuba:

- Andrea Borrell
- Bárbara Bécquer
- Caridad Despaigne
- Inocenta Corvea
- María de los Santos
- María Moret
- Matilde Charro
- Nancy Atiez
- Santa Margarita Skeet
- Sonia de la Paz
- Vicenta Salmón
- Virginia Pérez

== Hungary ==
The following players represented Hungary:

- Ágnes Németh
- Erzsébet Szentesi
- Éva Gulyás
- Györgyi Vertetics
- Ildikó Gulyás
- Ilona Kovács
- Ilona Lőrincz
- Judit Medgyesi
- Katalin Szuchy
- Lenke Jacsó-Kiss
- Magdolna Gulyás
- Zsuzsa Boksay

== Italy ==
The following players represented Italy:

- Antonietta Baistrocchi
- Bianca Rossi
- Chiara Guzzonato
- Emanuela Silimbani
- Lidia Gorlin
- Mariangela Piancastelli
- Marinella Draghetti
- Nunziata Serradimigni
- Orietta Grossi
- Roberta Faccin
- Rosanna Vergnano
- Wanda Sandon

== Soviet Union ==
The following players represented the Soviet Union:

- Angelė Rupšienė
- Tetiana Zakharova-Nadyrova
- Olga Barysheva-Korostelyova
- Tatyana Ovechkina
- Nadezhda Shuvayeva-Olkhova
- Uljana Semjonova
- Nelli Feryabnikova
- Olga Sukharnova
- Lyubov Sharmay
- Vida Beselienė
- Lyudmila Rogozhina
- Tatyana Ivinskaya

== Yugoslavia ==
The following players represented Yugoslavia:

- Vera Ðurašković
- Mersada Bećirspahić
- Jelica Komnenović
- Mira Bjedov
- Vukica Mitić
- Sanja Ožegović
- Sofija Pekić
- Marija Tonković
- Zorica Ðurković
- Vesna Despotović
- Biljana Majstorović
- Jasmina Perazić
