= Cuba at the 1980 Summer Olympics =

- IOC code: CUB
- NOC: Cuban Olympic Committee

in Moscow
- Competitors: 207 (175 men and 32 women) in 19 sports
- Flag bearer: Teófilo Stevenson
- Medals Ranked 4th: Gold 8 Silver 7 Bronze 5 Total 20

Summer Olympics appearances (overview)
- 1900; 1904; 1908–1920; 1924; 1928; 1932–1936; 1948; 1952; 1956; 1960; 1964; 1968; 1972; 1976; 1980; 1984–1988; 1992; 1996; 2000; 2004; 2008; 2012; 2016; 2020; 2024

Cuba competed at the 1980 Summer Olympics in Moscow, Soviet Union. 207 competitors, 175 men and 32 women, took part in 92 events in 19 sports.

== Medalists ==
=== Gold ===
- María Caridad Colón — Athletics, Women's Javelin Throw
- Juan Hernández — Boxing, Men's Bantamweight
- Ángel Herrera — Boxing, Men's Lightweight
- Andrés Aldama — Boxing, Men's Welterweight
- Armando Martínez — Boxing, Men's Light Middleweight
- José Gómez Mustelier — Boxing, Men's Middleweight
- Teófilo Stevenson — Boxing, Men's Heavyweight
- Daniel Núñez — Weightlifting, Men's Bantamweight

=== Silver ===
- Silvio Leonard — Athletics, Men's 100 metres
- Alejandro Casañas — Athletics, Men's 110 metres Hurdles
- Hipólito Ramos — Boxing, Men's Light Flyweight
- Adolfo Horta — Boxing, Men's Featherweight
- Jose Rodríguez — Judo, Men's Extra Lightweight (60 kg)
- Juan Ferrer — Judo, Men's Half Middleweight (78 kg)
- Isaac Azcuy — Judo, Men's Middleweight (86 kg)

=== Bronze ===
- Luis Delis — Athletics, Men's Discus Throw
- José Aguilar — Boxing, Men's Light Welterweight
- Ricardo Rojas — Boxing, Men's Light Heavyweight
- Roberto Castrillo — Shooting, Men's Skeet Shooting
- Alberto Blanco — Weightlifting, Men's 100 kg

== Athletics ==
Men's 100 metres

- Silvio Leonard
  - Heat — 10.33
  - Quarterfinals — 10.16
  - Semifinals — 10.40
  - Final — 10.25 (→ Silver Medal)
- Osvaldo Lara
  - Heat — 10.39
  - Quarterfinals — 10.21
  - Semifinals — 10.34
  - Final — 10.43 (→ 5th place)
- Tomás González
  - Heat — 10.65
  - Quarterfinals — 10.44 (→ did not advance)

Men's 200 metres

- Silvio Leonard
- Osvaldo Lara
- Tomás González

Men's 400 metres

- Alberto Juantorena

Men's Marathon

- Radamés González
  - Final — did not finish (→ no ranking)

Men's 110 m Hurdles

- Alejandro Casañas
  - Heat — 13.46
  - Semifinals — 13.44
  - Final — 13.40 (→ Silver Medal)

Men's 4×100 metres Relay

- Osvaldo Lara, Alejandro Casañas, Silvio Leonard, and Tomás González

Men's High Jump

- Francisco Centelles
  - Qualification — 2.10 m (→ did not advance)

Men's Long Jump

- David Giralt
  - Qualification — 7.57 m (→ did not advance)

Men's Triple Jump

- Armando Herrera
  - Qualification — 16.49 m
  - Final — 15.90 m (→ 11th place)
- Alejandro Herrera
  - Qualification — no mark (→ no ranking)

Men's Discus Throw

- Luis Delís
  - Qualification — 62.20 m
  - Final — 66.32 m (→ Bronze Medal)
- José Santa Cruz
  - Qualification — 60.14 m
  - Final — 61.52 m (→ 10th place)

Men's Hammer Throw

- Armando Orozco
  - Qualification — 72.28 m
  - Final Round — 68.68 m (→ 11th place)

Women's Shot Put

- María Elena Sarría
  - Final — 19.37 m (→ 9th place)

Women's Discus Throw

- Carmen Romero
  - Qualification — 58.60 m
  - Final — 60.86 m (→ 10th place)
- María Cristina Betancourt
  - Qualification — 57.62 m (→ did not advance)

Women's Javelin Throw

- María Caridad Colón
  - Qualification — 62.42 m
  - Final — 68.40 m (→ Gold Medal)

== Basketball ==
Men's Team Competition

- Preliminary Round (Group C)
  - Defeated Australia (83-76)
  - Defeated Sweden (71-59)
  - Lost to Italy (72-79)
- Semi Final Round (Group A)
  - Lost to Brazil (93-94)
  - Lost to Yugoslavia (84-112)
  - Lost to Spain (95-96)
  - Lost to Soviet Union (90-109) → 6th place
- Team Roster:
  - Jorge More
  - Ruperto Herrera
  - Alejandro Ortiz
  - Noangel Luaces
  - Generoso Márquez
  - Raúl Duboy
  - Pedro Abreu
  - Miguel Calderón
  - Tomás Herrera
  - Daniel Scott
  - Alejandro Urgelles
  - Félix Morales

Women's Team Competition

- Team Roster:
  - Andrea Borrell
  - Barbara Becquer
  - Caridad Despaigne
  - Inocenta Corvea
  - María de los Santos
  - María Moret
  - Matilde Charro
  - Nancy Atiez
  - Santa Margarita Skeet
  - Sonia de la Paz
  - Vicenta Salmon
  - Virginia Pérez

== Boxing ==
Men's Light Flyweight (48 kg)

- Hipólito Ramos → Silver Medal
  1. First Round — Bye
  2. Second Round — Defeated Farid Salman Mahdi (Iraq) on points (5-0)
  3. Quarter Finals — Defeated György Gedó (Hungary) on points (5-0)
  4. Semi Finals — Defeated Ismail Mustafov (Bulgaria) on points (4-1)
  5. Final — Lost to Shamil Sabirov (Soviet Union) on points (2-3)

Men's Flyweight (51 kg)

- Jorge Hernández
  1. First Round — Bye
  2. Second Round — Lost to Viktor Miroshnichenko (Soviet Union) on points (1-4)

Men's Bantamweight (54 kg)

- Juan Hernández → Gold Medal
  1. First Round — Bye
  2. Second Round — Defeated Sándor Farkas (Hungary) on points (4-1)
  3. Third Round — Defeated Ayele Mohammed (Ethiopia) after referee stopped contest in second round
  4. Quarter Finals — Defeated Geraldi Issaick (Tanzania) after referee stopped contest in first round
  5. Semi Finals — Defeated Michael Anthony (Guyana) on points (5-0)
  6. Final — Defeated Bernardo Piñango (Venezuela) on points (5-0)

Men's Featherweight (57 kg)

- Adolfo Horta → Silver Medal
  1. First Round — Bye
  2. Second Round — Defeated Odd Bengtsson (Sweden) on points (5-0)
  3. Third Round — Defeated Titi Cercel (Romania) on points (5-0)
  4. Quarter Finals — Defeated Luis Pizarro (Puerto Rico) on points (5-0)
  5. Semi Finals — Defeated Krzysztof Kosedowski (Poland) retired
  6. Final — Lost to Rudi Fink (East Germany) on points (1-4)

Men's Lightweight (60 kg)

- Ángel Herrera → Gold Medal
  1. First Round — Defeated Carlo Russolillo (Italy) on points (5-0)
  2. Second Round — Defeated Geza Tumbas (Yugoslavia) on points (5-0)
  3. Quarter Finals — Defeated Galsandorj Batbileg (Mongolia) on points (5-0)
  4. Semi Finals — Defeated Kazimierz Adach (Poland) on points (5-0)
  5. Final — Defeated Viktor Demyanenko (Soviet Union) after referee stopped contest in third round

Men's Light-Welterweight (63,5 kg)

- José Aguilar → Bronze Medal
  1. First Round — Defeated Martin Brerton (Ireland) after referee stopped contest in first round
  2. Second Round — Defeated Ryu Bun-Hwa (North Korea) on points (4-1)
  3. Quarter Finals — Defeated Farouk Jawad (Iraq) after referee stopped contest in third round
  4. Semi Finals — Lost to Serik Konakbaev (Soviet Union) on points (1-4)

Men's Heavyweight (+ 81 kg)

- Teófilo Stevenson → Gold Medal
  1. First Round — Defeated Solomon Ataga (Nigeria) after knock-out in first round
  2. Quarter Finals — Defeated Grzegorz Skrzecz (Poland) after knock-out in third round
  3. Semi Finals — Defeated István Lévai (Hungary) on points (5-0)
  4. Final — Defeated Piotr Zaev (Soviet Union) on points (4-1)

== Cycling ==
Three cyclists represented Cuba in 1980.

Individual road race

- Gregorio Aldo Arencibia
- Carlos Cardet
- Antonio Quintero

== Diving ==
Men's Springboard

- Rolando Ruiz
  - Preliminary Round — 489.24 points (→ did not advance)

== Fencing ==
12 fencers, 8 men and 4 women, represented Cuba in 1980.

Men's foil

- Heriberto González
- Efigenio Favier
- Guillermo Betancourt

Men's team foil

- Efigenio Favier, Guillermo Betancourt, Heriberto González, Pedro Hernández

Men's épée

- Efigenio Favier
- Guillermo Betancourt
- Heriberto González

Men's team épée

- Efigenio Favier, Guillermo Betancourt, Heriberto González, Pedro Hernández

Men's sabre

- José Laverdecia
- Jesús Ortíz
- Manuel Ortíz

Men's team sabre

- Manuel Ortíz, Jesús Ortíz, José Laverdecia, Guzman Salazar

Women's foil

- Clara Alfonso
- Marlene Font
- Margarita Rodríguez

Women's team foil

- Margarita Rodríguez, Marlene Font, María Esther García, Clara Alfonso

== Football ==
Men's Team Competition

- Preliminary Round (Group A)
  - Defeated Zambia (1-0)
  - Defeated Venezuela (2-1)
  - Lost to Soviet Union (0-8)
- Quarter Finals
  - Lost to Czechoslovakia (0-3)
- Team Roster
  - José Reinoso
  - Miguel López
  - Raimundo Frometa
  - Luís Sanchez
  - Luís Dreke
  - Roberto Espinosa
  - Andres Roldan
  - Amado Povea
  - Dagoberto Lara
  - Ramon Núñez
  - Luis Hernández
  - Roberto Pereira
  - Regino Delgado
  - Jorge Masso
  - Fermín Madera
  - Carlos Loredo

== Handball ==
Men's Team Competition

- Preliminary Round (Group A)
  - Lost to Denmark (18-30)
  - Lost to Poland (19-34)
  - Lost to East Germany (20-27)
  - Drew with Spain (24-24)
  - Lost to Hungary (22-26)
- Classification Match
  - 11th/12th place: Defeated Kuwait (32-24) → 11th place
- Team Roster
  - Pablo Pedroso
  - Roberto Casuso
  - Jesús Agramonte
  - Miguel Izquierdo
  - José Neninger
  - Juan Llanes
  - Juan Querol
  - Juan Prendes
  - Sabino Medina
  - Roberto Zulueta
  - Moisés Casales
  - Ibrain Crombet
  - Lázaro Jiménez
  - Lázaro Pedroso

== Hockey ==
Men's Team Competition

- Preliminary Round
  - Cuba — Poland 1-7
  - Cuba — Soviet Union 2-11
  - Cuba — Tanzania 4-0
  - Cuba — India 0-13
  - Cuba — Spain 0-11
- Classification Match
  - 5th-6th place: Cuba — Tanzania 4-1 → 5th place
- Team Roster:
  - Ángel Mora
  - Severo Frometa
  - Bernabé Izquierdo
  - Edgardo Vázquez
  - Héctor Pedroso
  - Tomás Varela
  - Raúl García
  - Jorge Mico
  - Rodolfo Delgado
  - Lazaro Hernández
  - Juan Blanco
  - Juan Caballero
  - Roberto Ramírez
  - Ángel Fontane
  - Ricardo Campos
  - Juan Ríos

== Judo ==
Men's Extra-Lightweight

- José Rodríguez

Men's Half-Lightweight

- Héctor Rodríguez

Men's Lightweight

- Ricardo Tuero

Men's Half-Middleweight

- Juan Ferrer

Men's Middleweight

- Isaac Azcuy

Men's Half-Heavyweight

- Rolando José Tornes

== Sailing ==
Three men represented Cuba at sailing:

Finn class
Alberto Gallardo (20th)

470 class
Ángel Jiménez, Vicente de la Guardia (12th)

== Volleyball ==
Men's Team Competition

- Preliminary Round (Group A)
  - Defeated Italy (3-0)
  - Lost to Bulgaria (1-3)
  - Lost to Czechoslovakia (2-3)
  - Lost to Soviet Union (0-3)
- Classification Matches
  - 5th/8th place: Lost to Yugoslavia (2-3)
  - 7th/8th place: Defeated Czechoslovakia (3-1) → 7th place
- Team Roster
  - Diego Lapera
  - Víctor García
  - Luis Oviedo
  - Ernesto Martínez
  - Ricardo Leyva
  - Jorge Garbey
  - Raúl Vilches
  - Carlos Salas
  - Antonio Pérez
  - Leonel Marshall Steward, Sr.
  - Carlos Ruiz
  - José David Suárez

Women's Team Competition

- Preliminary Round (Group A)
  - Lost to East Germany (1-3)
  - Defeated Peru (3-0)
  - Lost to Soviet Union (0-3)
- Classification Match
  - 5th/6th place: Defeated Peru (3-1) → 5th place
- Team Roster
  - Mercedes Pérez
  - Imilsis Téllez
  - Ana Díaz
  - Mercedes Pomares
  - Mavis Guilarte
  - Libertad González
  - Erenia Díaz
  - Maura Alfonso
  - Josefina Capote
  - Nelly Barnet
  - Ana María García
  - Lucila Urgelles

== Water polo ==
Men's Team Competition

- Preliminary Round (Group C)
  - Drew with Yugoslavia (6-6)
  - Defeated Australia (6-4)
  - Defeated Bulgaria (7-1)
- Final Round (Group A)
  - Drew with Yugoslavia (7-7)
  - Drew with Netherlands (7-7)
  - Lost to Soviet Union (5-8)
  - Lost to Hungary (5-7)
  - Lost to Spain (7-9) → 5th place
- Team Roster
  - Oscar Periche
  - Orlando Cowley
  - Bárbaro Díaz
  - Lazaro Costa
  - Pedro Rodríguez
  - Nelson Domínguez
  - Jorge Rizo
  - Arturo Ramos
  - Carlos Benítez
  - Gerardo Rodríguez
  - Oriel Domínguez
