= Hungary at the 1980 Summer Olympics =

- IOC code: HUN
- NOC: Hungarian Olympic Committee

in Moscow
- Competitors: 263 (182 men and 81 women) in 21 sports
- Flag bearer: István Szívós, Jr.
- Medals Ranked 6th: Gold 7 Silver 10 Bronze 15 Total 32

Summer Olympics appearances (overview)
- 1896; 1900; 1904; 1908; 1912; 1920; 1924; 1928; 1932; 1936; 1948; 1952; 1956; 1960; 1964; 1968; 1972; 1976; 1980; 1984; 1988; 1992; 1996; 2000; 2004; 2008; 2012; 2016; 2020; 2024; 2028

Other related appearances
- 1906 Intercalated Games

Hungary competed at the 1980 Summer Olympics in Moscow, USSR. 263 competitors, 182 men and 81 women, took part in 151 events in 21 sports.

== Medalists ==
=== Gold ===
- László Foltán and István Vaskuti — Canoeing, Men's C2 500m Canadian Pairs
- Zoltán Magyar — Gymnastics, Men's Pommeled Horse
- Károly Varga — Shooting, Men's Small-bore Rifle Prone
- Sándor Wladár — Swimming, Men's 200m Backstroke
- Péter Baczakó — Weightlifting, Men's Middle Heavyweight
- Ferenc Kocsis — Wrestling, Men's Greco-Roman Welterweight
- Norbert Növényi — Wrestling, Men's Greco-Roman Light Heavyweight

=== Silver ===
- István Joós and István Szabó — Canoeing, Men's K2 1000m Kayak Pairs
- Ernõ Kolczonay — Fencing, Men's Épée Individual
- Magda Maros — Fencing, Women's Foil Individual
- Tamás Szombathelyi — Pentathlon, Men's Individual Competition
- László Horváth, Tibor Maracskó and Tamás Szombathelyi — Pentathlon, Men's Team Competition
- Zoltán Verrasztó — Swimming, Men's 200m Backstroke
- Albán Vermes — Swimming, Men's 200m Breaststroke
- Lajos Rácz — Wrestling, Men's Greco-Roman Flyweight
- István Tóth — Wrestling, Men's Greco-Roman Featherweight
- József Balla — Wrestling, Men's Freestyle Super Heavyweight

=== Bronze ===
- János Váradi — Boxing, Men's Flyweight
- István Lévai — Boxing, Men's Heavyweight
- Éva Rakusz and Mária Zakariás — Canoeing, Women's K2 500m Kayak Pairs
- Imre Gedővári — Fencing, Men's Sabre Individual
- Imre Gedővári, Pál Gerevich, Ferenc Hammang, György Nébald and Rudolf Nébald — Fencing, Men's Sabre Team
- Edit Kovács, Magda Maros, Ildikó Schwarczenberger, Gertrúd Stefanek and Zsuzsanna Szőcs — Fencing, Women's Foil Team
- Ferenc Donáth, György Guczoghy, Zoltán Kelemen, Zoltán Magyar, Péter Kovács, and István Vámos — Gymnastics, Men's Team Combined Exercises
- Tibor Kincses — Judo, Men's Extra Lightweight (60 kg)
- András Ozsvár — Judo, Men's Open Class
- Zoltán Verrasztó — Swimming, Men's 400m Individual Medley
- György Szalai — Weightlifting, Heavyweight
- Endre Molnár, István Szívós, Jr., Attila Sudár, György Gerendás, György Horkai, Gábor Csapó, István Kiss, István Udvardi, László Kuncz, Tamás Faragó, and Károly Hauszler — Water Polo, Men's Team Competition
- Ferenc Seres — Wrestling, Men's Greco-Roman Light Flyweight
- István Kovács — Wrestling, Men's Freestyle Middleweight
- Szabolcs Detre and Zsolt Detre — Sailing, Men's Flying Dutchman

== Archery ==
After missing the 1976 archery competition, Hungary returned in 1980. The nation was represented by two women and two men, including 1972 veteran Bela Nagy. Nagy placed 5th, only three points behind the bronze medallist.

Women's individual competition

- Judit Kovacs — 2323 points (→ 12th place)
- Margit Szobi — 2216 points (→ 21st place)

Men's individual competition

- Bela Nagy — 2446 points (→ 5th place)
- Istvan Balasz — 2241 points (→ 28th place)

== Athletics ==
Men's 100 metres

- István Nagy

- Heat — 10.68 (→ did not advance)

- István Tatár

- Heat — 10.69 (→ did not advance)

Men's 200 metres

- Ferenc Kiss
- István Nagy

Men's 800 metres

- András Paróczai

- Heat — 1:47.5
- Semifinals — 1:48.8 (→ did not advance)

Men's marathon

- Ferenc Szekeres

- Final — 2:15:18 (→ 12th place)

Men's 400 metres hurdles

- József Szalai

- Heat — 50.23
- Semifinals — 51.06 (→ did not advance)

Men's 4 × 100 metres relay

- István Tatár, István Nagy, László Babály, Sr., and Ferenc Kiss

Men's 20 kilometres walk

- János Szálas

- Final — 1:34:10.5 (→ 12th place)

Men's 50 kilometres walk

- László Sátor

- Final — 4:10:53 (→ 9th place)

Men's high jump

- Zoltán Társi

- Qualification — 2.18 m (→ did not advance)

- István Gibicsár

- Qualification — 2.15 m (→ did not advance)

Men's long jump

- László Szalma

- Qualification — 7.91 m
- Final — 8.13 m (→ 4th place)

- Béla Bakosi

- Qualification — 7.29 m (→ did not advance)

Men's triple jump

- Béla Bakosi

- Qualification — 16.45 m
- Final — 16.47 m (→ 7th place)

Men's javelin throw

- Miklós Németh

- Qualification — 84.84 m
- Final — 82.40 m (→ 8th place)

- Ferenc Paragi

- Qualification — 88.76 m
- Final — 79.52 m (→ 10th place)

Women's 200 metres

- Irén Orosz-Árva

Women's 400 metres

- Ilona Pál
- Judit Forgács

Women's 100 metres hurdles

- Xénia Siska

- Heat — 13.23
- Semifinal — did not finish (→ did not advance)

Women's 4 × 400 metres relay

- Irén Orosz-Árva, Judit Forgács, Éva Tóth, Ilona Pál, and Ibolya Petrika

Women's high jump

- Andrea Mátay

- Qualification — 1.88 m
- Final — 1.85 m (→ 10th place)

Women's long jump

- Mária Pap

- Qualifying Round — 6.41 m (→ did not advance, 14th place)

- Margit Papp

- Qualifying Round — 6.32 m (→ did not advance, 16th place)

Women's discus throw

- Ágnes Herczegh

- Qualification — 57.80 m
- Final — 55.06 m (→ 12th place)

- Katalin Csőke

- Qualification — 57.38 m (→ did not advance)

Women's javelin throw

- Mária Janák

- Qualification — 57.80 m (→ did not advance)

Women's pentathlon

- Margit Papp — 4562 points (→ 5th place)

- 100 metres — 13.96s
- Shot Put — 14.94m
- High Jump — 1.74m
- Long Jump — 6.35m
- 800 metres — 2:15.80

== Basketball ==
The following players represented Hungary in the women's tournament:

- Ágnes Németh
- Erzsébet Szentesi
- Éva Gulyás
- Györgyi Vertetics
- Ildikó Gulyás
- Ilona Kovács
- Ilona Lőrincz
- Judit Medgyesi
- Katalin Szuchy
- Lenke Jacsó-Kiss
- Magdolna Gulyás
- Zsuzsa Boksay

== Boxing ==
Men's light flyweight (– 48 kg)

- György Gedó
  1. First Round — Bye
  2. Second Round — Defeated Charles Lubulwa (Uganda) after referee stopped contest in first round
  3. Quarter Finals — Lost to Hipolito Ramos (Cuba) on points (0-5)

Men's flyweight (– 51 kg)

- János Váradi → Bronze Medal
  1. First Round — Bye
  2. Second Round — Defeated Rabiraj Thapa (Nepal) after referee stopped contest in first round
  3. Quarter Finals — Defeated Daniel Radu (Romania) on points (4-1)
  4. Semi Finals — Lost to Viktor Miroshnichenko (Soviet Union) on points (4-1)

Men's bantamweight (– 54 kg)

- Sándor Farkas
  1. First Round — Bye
  2. Second Round — Lost to Juan Hernández (Cuba) on points (1-4)

Men's featherweight (– 57 kg)

- Róbert Gönczi
  1. First Round — Bye
  2. Second Round — Lost to Titi Cercel (Romania) on points (0-5)

Men's lightweight (– 60 kg)

- Tibor Dezamits
  1. First Round — Defeated Alphonse Matoubela (Congo) on points (5-0)
  2. Second Round — Lost to Yordan Lesov (Bulgaria) on points (1-4)

Men's light Welterweight (– 63,5 kg)

- Imre Bacskai
  1. First Round — Defeated Paul Kamela Fogang (Cameroon) on points (4-1)
  2. Second Round — Lost to Serik Konakbayev (Soviet Union) after retiring in second round

Men's welterweight (– 67 kg)

- Imre Csjef
  1. First Round — Lost to Paul Rasamimanana (Madagascar) after knock-out in second round

Men's light heavyweight (– 81 kg)

- Csaba Kuzma
  1. First Round — Lost to Michael Madsen (Denmark) on points (3-2)

Men's heavyweight (+ 81 kg)

- István Lévai → Bronze Medal
  1. First Round — Bye
  2. Quarter Finals — Defeated Anders Eklund (Sweden) on points (4-1)
  3. Semi Finals — Lost to Teófilo Stevenson (Cuba) on points (0-5)

== Cycling ==
Ten cyclists represented Hungary in 1980.

Men's individual road race

- András Takács
- Zoltán Halász
- György Szuromi
- László Halász

Men's team time trial

- Tamás Csathó
- László Halász
- Zoltán Halász
- András Takács

Men's sprint

- László Morcz

Men's team pursuit

- Ervin Dér
- Csaba Pálinkás
- Zsigmond Sarkadi Nagy
- Gábor Szűcs

== Diving ==
Men's 3 metre springboard

- Károly Némedi

- Preliminary Round — 475.17 points (→ 17th place, did not advance)

Men's 10 metre platform

- Károly Némedi

- Preliminary Round — 429.75 points (→ 14th place, did not advance)

== Fencing ==
18 fencers, 13 men and 5 women, represented Hungary in 1980.

Men's foil

- István Szelei
- László Demény
- András Papp

Men's team foil

- István Szelei, Ernő Kolczonay, András Papp, László Demény, Jenő Pap

Men's épée

- Ernő Kolczonay, István Osztrics, László Pető

Men's team épée

- Ernő Kolczonay, István Osztrics, László Pető, Jenő Pap, Péter Takács

Men's sabre

- Imre Gedővári
- Pál Gerevich
- György Nébald

Men's team sabre

- Imre Gedővári, Pál Gerevich, Ferenc Hammang, Rudolf Nébald, György Nébald

Women's foil

- Magda Maros
- Ildikó Schwarczenberger-Tordasi
- Gertrúd Stefanek

Women's team foil

- Magda Maros, Edit Kovács, Ildikó Schwarczenberger-Tordasi, Zsuzsa Szőcs, Gertrúd Stefanek

== Handball ==
Men's team competition

- Preliminary round (Group A)

- Drew with Poland (20-20)
- Drew with East Germany (14-14)
- Defeated Spain (20-17)
- Defeated Denmark (16-15)
- Defeated Cuba (26-22)

- Classification match

- Bronze medal match: Lost to Romania (18-20) → 4th place

- Team roster

- Béla Bartalos
- László Szabó
- Péter Kovács
- Sándor Vass
- János Fodor
- István Szilágyi
- József Kenyeres
- László Jánovszki
- Ambrus Lele
- Ernő Gubányi
- Zsolt Kontra
- Alpár Jegenyés
- Árpád Pál
- Miklós Kovacsics

== Judo ==
The following judoka represented Hungary:

Men's extra-lightweight (60 kg)

- Tibor Kincses – 3T (bronze)

Men's half-lightweight (65 kg)

- Imre Gelencsér – 19T

Men's lightweight (71 kg)

- Károly Molnár – 12T

Men's half-middleweight (78 kg)

- János Gyáni – 17T

Men's middleweight (86 kg)

- Endre Kiss – 19T

Men's half-heavyweight (95 kg)

- István Szepesi – 5T

Men's heavyweight (+95 kg)

- Imre Varga – 8T

Men's open class

- András Ozsvár – 3T (bronze)

== Modern pentathlon ==
Three male pentathletes represented Hungary in 1980. They won a team silver and Tamás Szombathelyi won an individual silver.

Men's individual competition

- Tamás Szombathelyi — 5502pts, Silver Medal
- Tibor Maracskó — 5279pts, 5th place
- László Horváth — 5131pts, 19th place

Men's team competition

- Szombathelyi, Maracskó, and Horváth — 15912 pts, Silver Medal

== Swimming ==
Men's 100 metre backstroke

- Róbert Rudolf
- Zoltán Verrasztó
- Sándor Wladár

Men's 200 metre backstroke

- Róbert Rudolf
- Zoltán Verrasztó
- Sándor Wladár

Men's 100 metre breaststroke

- János Dzvonyár
- Albán Vermes

Men's 200 metre breaststroke

- János Dzvonyár
- Albán Vermes

Men's 100 metre butterfly

- Gábor Mészáros

Men's 200 metre butterfly

- Gábor Mészáros

Men's 100 metre freestyle

- Gábor Mészáros

Men's 400 metre freestyle

- Sándor Nagy
- Zoltán Wladár

Men's 1500 metre freestyle

- Sándor Nagy
- Zoltán Wladár

Men's 400 metre individual medley

- András Hargitay
- Csaba Sós
- Zoltán Verrasztó

Men's 4 × 100 metre medley relay

- János Dzvonyár, Gábor Mészáros, Zoltán Verrasztó, Sándor Wladár

Women's 100 metre backstroke

- Ágnes Fodor

Women's 200 metre backstroke

- Ágnes Fodor

Women's 100 metre breaststroke

- Gabriella Kindl

- Heats — 1:14.33 (→ did not advance)

Women's 200 metre breaststroke

- Gabriella Kindl

Women's 100 metre butterfly

- Éva Miklósfalvy

Women's 200 metre butterfly

- Éva Miklósfalvy

Women's 400 metre freestyle

- Klára Gulyás

Women's 800 metre freestyle

- Klára Gulyás

Women's 400 metre individual medley

- Klára Gulyás

- Heats — did not start (→ did not advance)

== Volleyball ==
Women's team competition

- Preliminary round (Group B)

- Defeated Brazil (3-2)
- Lost to Romania (2-3)
- Defeated Bulgaria (3-1)

- Semi finals

- Lost to Soviet Union (0-3)

- Bronze medal game

- Lost to Bulgaria (2-3) → 4th place

- Team roster

- Julianna Szalonna
- Éva Szalay
- Gyöngyi Bardi
- Ágnes Juhász
- Lucia Bánhegyi
- Gabriella Fekete
- Emőke Szegedi-Vargha
- Emerencia Király
- Ágnes Torma
- Erzsébet Varga
- Gabriella Lengyel
- Bernadett Kőszegi

== Water polo ==
Men's team competition

- Preliminary Round (Group A)

- Drew with Romania (6-6)
- Defeated Netherlands (5-3)
- Defeated Greece (8-5)

- Final Round (Group A)

- Lost to Soviet Union (4-5)
- Lost to Yugoslavia (7-8)
- Defeated Spain (6-5)
- Defeated Cuba (7-5)
- Defeated Netherlands (8-7) → Bronze Medal

- Team roster

- Endre Molnár
- István Szívós, Jr.
- Attila Sudár
- György Gerendás
- György Horkai
- Gábor Csapó
- István Kiss
- István Udvardi
- László Kuncz
- Tamás Faragó
- Károly Hauszler
