= 1983 FIBA World Championship for Women squads =

The 1983 FIBA World Championship for Women squads were the squads of the 1983 FIBA World Championship for Women. Each one of the 14 teams at the tournament selected a squad of 12 players.

Ages and clubs listed are as of the tournament start on 24 July 1983.

Source: FIBA Archives (Note: In a few cases, names here have been corrected from source, where and only where a Wikipedia page exists for the player and the two are readily discernible as referring to the same person (e.g. slightly different Latinizations, married vs maiden names, reverse order of Chinese names, etc). If the birthdays for any such person disagree between their individual page and the FIBA source here, the FIBA source is preserved here regardless, as we have no way to determine which is correct.)

== Group A ==
=== Bulgaria ===
Bulgarian women's national basketball team – 1983 FIBA World Championship for Women roster
Players
Coaches

Pos.	No.	Name	Age – Date of birth	Height	Club	Ctr.
	4	Madka Goltcheva	–
	5	Larrissa Sachova	–
	6	Petkana Makaveeva	–
	7	Mariana Ivanova	–
	8	Vanya Dermendzhieva	24 – 3 December 1958			(West Germany)
	9	Penka Markova	20 – 11 February 1963
	10	Radmila Vasileva	19 – 5 January 1964			(Bulgaria)
	11	Kostadinka Radkova	21 – 27 June 1962			(France)
	12	Evladiya Slavcheva-Stefanova	21 – 25 February 1962			(Bulgaria)
	13	Madlena Staneva	20 – 1 June 1963			(France)
	14	Silvia Ghermanova	–
	14	Krasimira Banova	–

=== Cuba ===
Cuba women's national basketball team - 1983 FIBA World Championship for Women roster
Players
Coaches

Pos.	No.	Name	Age – Date of birth	Height	Club
	4	Leonor Borrelli	–
	5	Nancy Atiez	–
	6	María Moret	–
	7	Barbara Becquer	25 – 31 December 1957
	8	Ivon Carrillo	–
	9	Caridad Despaigne	–
	10	Matilde Charro	29 – 14 May 1954
	11	Melvis Coss Quintana	18 – 12 October 1964
G	12	Dalia Henry Hernandez	18 – 14 June 1965	1.81 m (5 ft 11 in)
	13	Odalis Cala	–
	14	Margarita Skeet	–
	15	Zenaida McCarthy	–

=== South Korea ===
South Korea women's national basketball team – 1983 FIBA World Championship for Women roster
Players
Coaches

Pos.	No.	Name	Age – Date of birth	Height	Club	Ctr.
	4	Ae Young Choi	–
	5	Jang Gae Park	–
	6	Hyung Sook Lee	18 – 24 December 1964
	7	Eun Kyung Woo	20 – 19 August 1962
	8	Myun Hee Kwon	–
	9	Sin Sil Bang	–
	10	Yang Sook Cha	–
	11	Hwa Soon Kim	–
	12	Hyun Ja Gong	–
	13	Young Hee Kim	–
	14	Kyung Ja Moon	–
	15	Chan-Sook Park	24 – 3 June 1959

=== Peru ===
Peru women's national basketball team – 1983 FIBA World Championship for Women roster
Players
Coaches

Pos.	No.	Name	Age – Date of birth	Height	Club	Ctr.
	4	Shellah Allison Hofeken	24 – 19 December 1958
	5	Silvana Perez Sotelo	19 – 10 September 1963
	6	Patricia Luna del Castillo	18 – 24 March 1965
	7	Marisa Casio	–
	8	Maria del Pilar Sueryras	–
	9	Katia Manzur Betalleluz	25 – 14 February 1958
	10	Mariella Picasso Salinas	28 – 20 April 1955
	11	Karin Junek de Seminario	27 – 28 December 1955
	12	Guadalupe Garces	–
	13	Liliana Comas Carbajal	20 – 21 February 1963
	14	Marilu Menendez Llosa	23 – 20 February 1960
	15	Rosa Quelopana Bohorquez	28 – 4 September 1954

== Group B ==
=== Australia ===
Australia women's national basketball team – 1983 FIBA World Championship for Women roster
Players
Coaches

Pos.	No.	Name	Age – Date of birth	Height	Club	Ctr.
	4	Robyn Maher	23 – 6 October 1959
	5	Bronwyn Marshall	–
	6	Patricia Cockrem	22 – 17 May 1961
	7	Jennifer Cheesman	25 – 2 November 1957
	8	Karen Ogden	–
	9	Patricia Mickan	26 – 12 March 1957
	10	Julie Nykiel	24 – 13 December 1958
	11	Kathryn Foster	23 – 7 May 1960
	12	Karin Fields (Maar)	30 – 11 June 1953
	13	Sharon Amiet Deacon	25 – 30 November 1957
	14	Wendy Laidlaw	24 – 19 February 1959
	15	Karen Dalton	22 – 2 January 1961

=== Japan ===
Japan women's national basketball team – 1983 FIBA World Championship for Women roster
Players
Coaches

Pos.	No.	Name	Age – Date of birth	Height	Club	Ctr.
	4	Chika Yamamoto	22 – 15 October 1960
	5	Akemi Nakahashi	21 – 5 August 1961
	6	Nanae Fujii	20 – 2 May 1963
	7	Takako Ohno	19 – 20 September 1963
	8	Kaori Chikaishi	19 – 23 September 1963
	9	Junko Matsuura	19 – 20 June 1964
	10	Kumi Kobota	–
	11	Kazumi Shimizu	20 – 20 December 1962
	12	Mika Sugihara	20 – 22 June 1963
	13	Chie Harada	21 – 25 November 1961
	14	Michiko Takahashi	19 – 7 July 1964
	15	Setsuko Hashizume	23 – 9 April 1960

=== Poland ===
Poland women's national basketball team – 1983 FIBA World Championship for Women roster
Players
Coaches

Pos.	No.	Name	Age – Date of birth	Height	Club	Ctr.
	4	Krystyna Zagórska	27 – 20 March 1956
	5	Wiesława Konwent	–
	6	Małgorzata Janowicz	21 – 21 January 1962			(Poland)
	7	Teresa Kępka	23 – 3 September 1959
	8	Mariola Pawlak	–
	9	Irena Linka	25 – 5 May 1958
	10	Małgorzata Kozera	–
	11	Grażyna Seweryn	23 – 14 November 1959
	12	Bożena Sędzicka	25 – 27 September 1957			(France)
	13	Małgorzata Niemiec	20 – 18 April 1963
	14	Małgorzata Wołujewicz	–
	15	Halina Iwaniec	30 – 5 January 1953

Head coach

Witold Huciński

=== Yugoslavia ===
Yugoslavia women's national basketball team – 1983 FIBA World Championship for Women roster
Players
Coaches

Pos.	No.	Name	Age – Date of birth	Height	Club	Ctr.
	4	Slavica Šuka	23 – 6 August 1959
	5	Snežana Božinović	19 – 23 December 1963
	6	Jelica Komnenović	23 – 16 April 1960			(Socialist Federal Republic of Yugoslavia)
	7	Olivera Čangalović	23 – 7 March 1960
	8	Olivera Krivokapić	20 – 6 September 1962			(Bulgaria)
	9	Stojna Vangelovska	19 – 5 February 1964			(North Macedonia)
	10	Slađana Golić	23 – 12 February 1960			(Bosnia and Herzegovina)
	11	Polona Dornik	20 – 20 November 1962			(Spain)
	12	Biljana Majstorović	23 – 31 December 1959			(Socialist Federal Republic of Yugoslavia)
	13	Jasmina Perazić	22 – 6 December 1960
	14	Cvetana Dekleva	20 – 24 April 1963
	15	Marija Uzelac	25 – 22 February 1958

Head coach

Milan Vasojević

== Group C ==
=== Canada ===
Canada women's national basketball team – 1983 FIBA World Championship for Women roster
Players
Coaches

Pos.	No.	Name	Age – Date of birth	Height	Club	Ctr.
	4	Tracie McAra	22 – 20 November 1960
	5	Carol Turney	28 – 26 June 1955
	6	Anna Pendergast	–
	7	Deborah Huband	26 – 5 September 1956
	8	Carol Sealey	24 – 18 April 1959
	9	Alison Lang	22 – 28 June 1961
	10	Heidi Bauer	–
	11	Sylvia Sweeney	26 – 3 October 1956
	12	Candace Lohr	24 – 30 November 1958
	13	Toni Kordic	19 – 1 January 1964
	14	Andrea Jill Blackwell	20 – 23 November 1962
	15	Andrea Verrecchia	–

=== China ===
China women's national basketball team – 1983 FIBA World Championship for Women roster
Players
Coaches

Pos.	No.	Name	Age – Date of birth	Height	Club	Ctr.
	4	Yuefang Chen	20 – 1 May 1963
	5	Yan Ba	20 – 18 December 1962
	6	Min Liu	23 – 31 January 1960
	7	Xiaobo Song	24 – 9 September 1958
	8	Chen Qiu	20 – 11 June 1963
	9	Shumin You	23 – 9 August 1959
	10	Lijuan Xiu	25 – 26 October 1957
	11	Haixia Zheng	16 – 7 March 1967
	12	Liquing Xian	–
	13	Hui Zhang	23 – 29 September 1959
	14	Ping Liu	–
	15	Yuequin Zhang	23 – 21 January 1960

=== Soviet Union ===
Soviet Union women's national basketball team – 1983 FIBA World Championship for Women roster
Players
Coaches

Pos.	No.	Name	Age – Date of birth	Height	Club	Ctr.
	4	Ramune-Neringa Shidlauskaite	22 – 28 June 1961
	5	Olga Korosteleva	28 – 24 August 1954
	6	Olesya Barel	23 – 9 February 1960			(Hungary)
	7	Tania Beloshapko	–
	8	Olga Buryakina	25 – 17 March 1958
	9	Nadia Olknova	–
	10	Uljana Semjonova	31 – 9 March 1952			(France)
	11	Lyudmila Rogozhina	24 – 2 May 1959			(Turkey)
	12	Elena Chausova	25 – 30 July 1957			(Russia)
	13	Olga Sukharnova	–
	14	Vida Besselene	–
	15	Galina Savitskaya	22 – 13 July 1961			(Spain)

=== Zaire ===
Zaire women's national basketball team – 1983 FIBA World Championship for Women roster
Players
Coaches

Pos.	No.	Name	Age – Date of birth	Height	Club	Ctr.
	4	Loganza Kamimbay	–
	5	Evoloko Bokele	–
	6	Bofonda Lomboto	–
	7	Ndombe Kiangbeni	–
	8	Komichelo Kayumba	–
	9	Lingenga Iyoko	–
	10	Tumbe Agbasing	–
	11	Nguya Nakwete	–
	12	Kamango Kasala	–
	13	Bompoko Lomboto	–
	14	Bakununu Mpanzu	–
	15	Djema Bokonda	–

== Semifinal Entrants ==
The United States qualified directly to the semifinal round as defending FIBA World Champions. Brazil qualified directly to the semifinal round as hosts.

=== Brazil ===
Brazil women's national basketball team – 1983 FIBA World Championship for Women roster
Players
Coaches

Pos.	No.	Name	Age – Date of birth	Height	Club	Ctr.
	4	Hortência de Fatima Marcari	23 – 24 September 1959
	5	Maria Angélica G. Silva	16 – 1 October 1966
	6	Anna Maria Krabenborg	–
	7	Solange Maria Castro	–
	8	Maria Paula Silva	–
	9	Eliza Garcia	21 – 22 February 1962
	10	Soraya B. Brandao	25 – 25 September 1957
	11	Marta Sobral	–
	12	Vania Teixeira	–
	13	Suzete Silva	–
	14	Cristina Punko	25 – 1 December 1957
	15	Vanda Rinalda Dal Col	22 – 1 January 1961

=== United States ===
United States women's national basketball team – 1983 FIBA World Championship for Women roster
Players
Coaches

Pos.	No.	Name	Age – Date of birth	Height	Club	Ctr.
	4	Patty Hedges	–
	5	Cheryl Lynn Cook	20 – 15 March 1963			(Spain)
	6	Lynette Woodard	23 – 12 August 1959			(Italy)
	7	Anne Theresa Donovan	21 – 1 November 1961
	8	LaTaunya Pollard	–
	9	Cheryl Miller	19 – 3 February 1964
	10	Janice Lawrence	–
	11	Cindy Noble	24 – 14 November 1958
	12	Kimberly Mulkey	21 – 17 May 1962
	13	Denise Marie Curry	23 – 22 August 1959			(France)
	14	Pamela Denise McGee	20 – 1 December 1962			(Spain)
	15	Lisa Ingram	19 – 14 July 1964
