= Basketball at the 1979 Pan American Games =

- Venue: Coliseo Eduardo Dibos
- Dates: July 2–13, 1979
- Competitors: 202 from 11 nations

Basketball competitions at the 1979 Pan American Games in San Juan, Puerto Rico began on July 2 and continued through July 13. The preliminary rounds were held at the Canovanas Coliseum and the Cancha Pepín Cestero, while the final round was held at the Roberto Clemente Coliseum.

== Medal table ==
Rank	Nation	Gold	Silver	Bronze	Total
1	United States	1	1	0	2
2	Cuba	1	0	0	1
3	Puerto Rico	0	1	0	1
4	Brazil	0	0	1	1
4	Canada	0	0	1	1
Totals (5 entries)		2	2	2	6

== Medalists ==
Event	Gold	Silver	Bronze
Men's tournament	United States; Michael Brooks; Sam Clancy; John Duren; Ronnie Lester; Kyle Macy; Kevin McHale; Mike O'Koren; Ralph Sampson; Isiah Thomas; Ray Tolbert; Danny Vranes; Mike Woodson	Puerto Rico; Carlos Bermúdez; Néstor Cora; Angel Cruz; Raymond Dalmau; César Fantaucci; Mario Morales; José "Willie" Quiñones; Rubén Rodríguez; Angel Santiago; Georgie Torres; Roberto Valderas; Michael Vicenz	Brazil; Marcos Leite; Fausto Giannechini; Marcel de Souza; Adilson Nascimento; Ubiratan Pereira; Hélio Rubens; José Carlos Saiani; Oscar Schmidt; Milton Setrini; Evaristo Soares; Marcelo Vido
Women's tournament	Cuba; Nancy Atiez; Andrea Borrell; Bárbara Bécquer; Matilde Charro; Inocenta Corvea; Sonia de la Paz; Caridad Despaigne; María Moret; Virginia Pérez; Martha Reinoso; Vicenta Salmón; Santa Margarita Skeet	United States; Barbara Brown; Carol Blazejowski; Denise Curry; Tara Heiss; Nancy Lieberman; Kris Kirchner; Ann Meyers; Jill Rankin; Jackie Swaim; Janice Trombly; Rosie Walker; Holly Warlick	Canada; Candace Clarkson; Chris Critelli; Denise Dignard; Sharon Douglas; Debbie Huband; Holly Jackson; Alison Lang; Dori McPhail; Bev Smith; Debbie Steele; Sylvia Sweeney; Carol Turney

== Participating nations ==
Eleven countries participated in the competition.

- Argentina (12 athletes)
- Bolivia (12)
- Brazil (24)
- Canada (24)
- Cuba (24)
- Dominican Republic (12)
- Mexico (23)
- Panama (11)
- Puerto Rico (24)
- United States (24)
- Virgin Islands (12)

== See also ==
- Basketball at the 1980 Summer Olympics
