= Larisa Spasova =

Bulgarian basketball player

Personal information
- Born: 22 August 1960 (age 65) Pernik, Bulgaria
- Height: 170 cm (5 ft 7 in)
- Weight: 57 kg (126 lb)
Medal record
Women's basketball
Representing Bulgaria
European Championships
Silver medal – second place	1983 Hungary	Team competition
Silver medal – second place	1985 Italy	Team competition
Bronze medal – third place	1989 Bulgaria	Team competition

Larisa Spasova (Bulgarian: Лариса Спасова, born 22 August 1960) is a Bulgarian basketball player. She competed in the women's tournament at the 1988 Summer Olympics.
