= 1992 FIBA World Olympic Qualifying Tournament for Women =

1992 FIBA Women's Olympic Qualifying Tournament for Women
5th Olympic Qualifying Tournament for Women

Tournament details
- Host country: Spain
- Dates: 28 May - 7 June
- Teams: 16 (from 5 federations)
- Venue: 1 (in 1 host city)

The 1992 FIBA World Olympic Qualifying Tournament for Women was a women's basketball tournament that consisted of 16 national teams, where the top four teams earned a place in the 1992 Summer Olympics basketball tournament in Barcelona, Spain. It was held in Vigo, from May 28 to June 7.

The Commonwealth of Independent States, China, Brazil and Czechoslovakia qualified for the 1992 Summer Olympics.

Due to the sanctions on Yugoslavia by the United Nations as a consequence of the Yugoslav Civil War, the International Basketball Federation added a game to the qualifying tournament to determine the fifth-place team, in which Italy defeated Canada. Lately, after the confirmation of the ban, the Italian team secured a spot in Barcelona.

== Format ==
The 16 teams were divided into two groups (Groups A–B) for the qualifying tournament. The first in each group was directed qualified for the 1992 Olympics, while the second from one group faced the third from the other for the final spots in the Games.

== Group A ==
Team	Pld	W	L	PF	PA	PD	Pts
China	7	6	1	591	432	+159	13
Czechoslovakia	7	6	1	576	451	+125	13
Brazil	7	5	2	673	539	+134	12
Australia	7	5	2	609	453	+156	12
Hungary	7	3	4	474	488	−14	10
Poland	7	2	5	484	521	−37	9
Zaire	7	1	6	367	581	−214	8
Dominican Republic	7	0	7	408	717	−309	7

Qualified directly for the 1992 Summer Olympics
Qualified for the final phase

28 May
10:45

Report

Australia	71–56	Poland
Scoring by half: 36–21, 35–35
Pts: Gorman 14		Pts: Urbankowska 19

As Travessas Sports Complex, Vigo

28 May
11:45

Report

Dominican Republic	76–79	Zaire
Scoring by half: 36–37, 40–42
Pts: Duran 21		Pts: Evoloko 21

As Travessas Sports Complex, Vigo

28 May
17:45

Report

Hungary	52–96	China
Scoring by half: 31–44, 21–52
Pts: Balogh, Sztojkovics 13		Pts: Dongmei 16

As Travessas Sports Complex, Vigo

28 May
19:30

Report

Brazil	89–91	Czechoslovakia
Scoring by half: 41–49, 48–42
Pts: Marcari 41		Pts: Burianova, Nemcová 20

As Travessas Sports Complex, Vigo

29 May
10:45

Report

Zaire	40–80	Hungary
Scoring by half: 22–45, 18–35
Pts: Alele, Pikinini 11		Pts: Csák, Sztojkovics 19

As Travessas Sports Complex, Vigo

29 May
12:30

Report

China	74–84	Australia
Scoring by half: 38–45, 36–39
Pts: Qing 14		Pts: Brondello 19

As Travessas Sports Complex, Vigo

29 May
16:00

Report

Czechoslovakia	128–50	Dominican Republic
Scoring by half: 65–25, 63–25
Pts: Chamajová 28		Pts: Duran 17

As Travessas Sports Complex, Vigo

29 May
19:30

Report

Poland	65–105	Brazil
Scoring by half: 35–59, 30–46
Pts: Sokolowska 13		Pts: Sobral, Souza 19

As Travessas Sports Complex, Vigo

31 May
10:45

Report

Dominican Republic	53–79	Hungary
Scoring by half: 25–37, 28–42
Pts: Guerrero 13		Pts: Sztojkovics 22

As Travessas Sports Complex, Vigo

31 May
14:15

Report

Australia	98–48	Zaire
Scoring by half: 40–26, 58–22
Pts: Gorman, Thornton 18		Pts: Kamanga 12

As Travessas Sports Complex, Vigo

31 May
17:45

Report

Brazil	77–89	China
Scoring by half: 38–42, 39–47
Pts: Sobral 21		Pts: Ping 20

As Travessas Sports Complex, Vigo

31 May
21:15

Report

Poland	63–69	Czechoslovakia
Scoring by half: 28–37, 35–32
Pts: Szamyjer 14		Pts: Hirakova 22

As Travessas Sports Complex, Vigo

1 June
9:00

Report

Zaire	60–90	Brazil
Scoring by half: 25–46, 35–44
Pts: Kamanga 18		Pts: Marcari 27

As Travessas Sports Complex, Vigo

1 June
12:30

Report

Dominican Republic	81–97	Poland
Scoring by half: 39–53, 42–44
Pts: Duran 18		Pts: Wrobel 23

As Travessas Sports Complex, Vigo

1 June
16:00

Report

Czechoslovakia	71–74	China
Scoring by half: 39–34, 32–40
Pts: Chupikova 19		Pts: Ping, Xing 15

As Travessas Sports Complex, Vigo

1 June
19:30

Report

Hungary	55–66	Australia
Scoring by half: 29–38, 26–28
Pts: Csák 18		Pts: Gorman, Timms 15

As Travessas Sports Complex, Vigo

3 June
10:45

Report

Zaire	45–74	Czechoslovakia
Scoring by half: 32–45, 13–29
Pts: Mbambi 10		Pts: Chupikova 16

As Travessas Sports Complex, Vigo

3 June
14:15

Report

Australia	124–49	Dominican Republic
Scoring by half: 61–25, 63–24
Pts: Brondello 22		Pts: Duran 21

As Travessas Sports Complex, Vigo

3 June
17:45

Report

China	75–64	Poland
Scoring by half: 40–30, 35–34
Pts: Dongmei 20		Pts: Jarzyna 12

As Travessas Sports Complex, Vigo

3 June
21:15

Report

Brazil	102–80	Hungary
Scoring by half: 56–53, 46–27
Pts: Marcari 30		Pts: Balogh 40

As Travessas Sports Complex, Vigo

4 June
9:00

Report

Dominican Republic	42–99	China
Scoring by half: 27–54, 15–45
Pts: Duran 12		Pts: Dongmei 16

As Travessas Sports Complex, Vigo

4 June
12:30

Report

Poland	79–53	Zaire
Scoring by half: 32–24, 47–29
Pts: Sokolowska 14		Pts: Kano 21

As Travessas Sports Complex, Vigo

4 June
16:00

Report

Hungary	61–71	Czechoslovakia
Scoring by half: 31–35, 30–36
Pts: Csák 16		Pts: Burianova 20

As Travessas Sports Complex, Vigo

4 June
19:15

Report

Australia	97–99 (2OT)	Brazil
Scoring by half: 45–43, 36–38 Overtime: 5–5, 11–13
Pts: Brondello 27		Pts: Marcari 43

As Travessas Sports Complex, Vigo

5 June
10:45

Report

China	84–42	Zaire
Scoring by half: 50–20, 34–22
Pts: Ping, Xing, 13		Pts: Kano 12

As Travessas Sports Complex, Vigo

5 June
11:15

Report

Brazil	111–57	Dominican Republic
Scoring by half: 50–29, 61–28
Pts: Arcain, Marcari 15		Pts: Aquino 15

As Travessas Sports Complex, Vigo

5 June
17:45

Report

Hungary	67–60	Poland
Scoring by half: 35–29, 32–31
Pts: Nemeth 20		Pts: Kudlak 19

As Travessas Sports Complex, Vigo

5 June
21:15

Report

Czechoslovakia	72–69	Australia
Scoring by half: 36–38, 36–31
Pts: Burianova 14		Pts: Brondello 19

As Travessas Sports Complex, Vigo

== Group B ==
Team	Pld	W	L	PF	PA	PD	Pts
CIS	7	7	0	582	390	+192	14
Italy	7	5	2	435	421	+14	12
Canada	7	4	3	427	450	−23	11
Bulgaria	7	4	3	521	499	+22	11
Japan	7	4	3	522	531	−9	11
South Korea	7	3	4	487	531	−44	10
Mexico	7	1	6	390	528	−138	8
Senegal	7	0	7	0	14	−14	7

Qualified directly for the 1992 Summer Olympics
Qualified for the final phase

28 May
9:00

Report

CIS	96–69	Japan
Scoring by half: 43–36, 53–33
Pts: Zasulskaya 22		Pts: Takako 20

As Travessas Sports Complex, Vigo

28 May

Mexico	2–0; Walkover	Senegal

As Travessas Sports Complex, Vigo

28 May
16:00

Report

Italy	83–81	South Korea
Scoring by half: 35–43, 48–38
Pts: Pollini 27		Pts: Choi 35

As Travessas Sports Complex, Vigo

28 May
22:00

Report

Canada	73–81	Bulgaria
Scoring by half: 44–34, 29–47
Pts: Karch 19		Pts: Slavtcheva 22

As Travessas Sports Complex, Vigo

29 May

Italy	2–0; Walkover	Senegal

As Travessas Sports Complex, Vigo

29 May
14:15

Report

Bulgaria	90–67	Mexico
Scoring by half: 43–30, 47–37
Pts: Ilieva 20		Pts: Arroyos 14

As Travessas Sports Complex, Vigo

29 May
17:45

Report

South Korea	73–105	CIS
Scoring by half: 40–43, 33–62
Pts: Yoo 34		Pts: Tornikidu 22

As Travessas Sports Complex, Vigo

29 May
21:15

Report

Japan	69–82	Canada
Scoring by half: 32–38, 37–44
Pts: Mikiko 24		Pts: Karch 20

As Travessas Sports Complex, Vigo

31 May
9:00

Report

Mexico	48–68	Italy
Scoring by half: 26–35, 22–33
Pts: Arroyos 11		Pts: Fullins 16

As Travessas Sports Complex, Vigo

31 May

CIS	2–0; Walkover	Senegal

As Travessas Sports Complex, Vigo

31 May
16:00

Report

Japan	105–100	Bulgaria
Scoring by half: 61–54, 44–46
Pts: Kikuko 30		Pts: Hadjiankova 35

As Travessas Sports Complex, Vigo

31 May
19:30

Report

Canada	87–76	South Korea
Scoring by half: 49–35, 38–41
Pts: Stammberger 17		Pts: Choi 15

As Travessas Sports Complex, Vigo

1 June
10:45

Report

Mexico	83–106	Japan
Scoring by half: 39–56, 44–50
Pts: Carrillo 19		Pts: Kikuko 27

As Travessas Sports Complex, Vigo

1 June

Canada	2–0; Walkover	Senegal

As Travessas Sports Complex, Vigo

1 June
17:45

Report

Bulgaria	88–68	South Korea
Scoring by half: 45–40, 43–28
Pts: Varbanova 24		Pts: Choi, Chung 19

As Travessas Sports Complex, Vigo

1 June
21:15

Report

Italy	55–88	CIS
Scoring by half: 22–46, 33–42
Pts: Rossi 8		Pts: Khudashova 16

As Travessas Sports Complex, Vigo

3 June

Bulgaria	2–0; Walkover	Senegal

As Travessas Sports Complex, Vigo

3 June
12:30

Report

South Korea	90–85	Japan
Scoring by half: 41–44, 49–31
Pts: Chung 19		Pts: Aki, Yuka 20

As Travessas Sports Complex, Vigo

3 June
16:00

Report

CIS	85–50	Mexico
Scoring by half: 37–26, 48–24
Pts: Baranova 20		Pts: Carrillo 15

As Travessas Sports Complex, Vigo

3 June
19:30

Report

Italy	67–53	Canada
Scoring by half: 31–29, 36–24
Pts: Pollini 24		Pts: Blackwell 18

As Travessas Sports Complex, Vigo

4 June
10:45

Report

Mexico	83–97	South Korea
Scoring by half: 37–46, 46–51
Pts: Arroyos 27		Pts: Chun 22

As Travessas Sports Complex, Vigo

4 June

Japan	2–0; Walkover	Senegal

As Travessas Sports Complex, Vigo

4 June
17:45

Report

Italy	81–74	Bulgaria
Scoring by half: 50–33, 31–41
Pts: Fullin 32		Pts: Radkova 24

As Travessas Sports Complex, Vigo

4 June
21:15

Report

CIS	101–57	Canada
Scoring by half: 55–31, 46–26
Pts: Zasulskaya 22		Pts: Robinson 13

As Travessas Sports Complex, Vigo

5 June

South Korea	2–0; Walkover	Senegal

As Travessas Sports Complex, Vigo

5 June
12:30

Report

Canada	82–57	Mexico
Scoring by half: 42–24, 40–33
Pts: Blackwell 20		Pts: Pineda 10

As Travessas Sports Complex, Vigo

5 June
16:00

Report

Italy	80–86 (OT)	Japan
Scoring by half: 35–35, 34–34 Overtime: 11–17
Pts: Fullin 15		Pts: Mikiko 24

As Travessas Sports Complex, Vigo

5 June
19:30

Report

Bulgaria	86–105	CIS
Scoring by half: 38–48, 48–57
Pts: Slavtcheva 24		Pts: Zasulskaya 28

As Travessas Sports Complex, Vigo

== Final phase ==
=== 3rd–6th place semifinals ===
6 June
19:00

Report

Brazil	94–76	Italy
Scoring by half: 44–38, 50–38
Pts: Marcari 26		Pts: Pollini 34

As Travessas Sports Complex, Vigo

6 June
21:00

Report

Czechoslovakia	79–64	Canada
Scoring by half: 46–27, 33–37
Pts: Burianova 23		Pts: Blackwell 21

As Travessas Sports Complex, Vigo

Brazil and Czechoslovakia qualified for the 1992 Summer Olympics

=== 5th place game ===
7 June
17:00

Report

Canada	44–66	Italy
Scoring by half: 20–37, 24–29
Pts: Blackwell 14		Pts: Fullin 26

As Travessas Sports Complex, Vigo

Italy qualified for the 1992 Summer Olympics
