= Madlena Staneva =

Bulgarian basketball player

Personal information
- Born: 1 June 1963 (age 63) Ruse, Bulgaria
- Height: 185 cm (6 ft 1 in)
- Weight: 78 kg (172 lb)
Medal record
Women's basketball
Representing Bulgaria
European Championships
Silver medal – second place	1983 Hungary	Team competition
Silver medal – second place	1985 Italy	Team competition
Bronze medal – third place	1989 Bulgaria	Team competition

Madlena Staneva (born 1 June 1963) is a Bulgarian former basketball player. She competed in the women's tournament at the 1988 Summer Olympics.
