= Mariana Chobanova =

Bulgarian basketball player

Personal information
- Born: 13 September 1965 (age 60) Blagoevgrad, Bulgaria
- Height: 187 cm (6 ft 2 in)
- Weight: 76 kg (168 lb)
Medal record
Women's basketball
Representing Bulgaria
European Championships
Silver medal – second place	1983 Hungary	Team competition
Silver medal – second place	1985 Italy	Team competition
Bronze medal – third place	1989 Bulgaria	Team competition

Mariana Chobanova-Kosturkova (Bulgarian: Мариана Чобанова-Костуркова, born 13 September 1965), also known as Mariyana Kirilova Kostourkova, is a Bulgarian basketball player. She competed in the women's tournament at the 1988 Summer Olympics.
