= Kostadinka Radkova =

Bulgarian basketball player

Personal information
- Born: 26 June 1962 (age 64) Sofia
- Height: 187 cm (6 ft 2 in)
- Weight: 80 kg (176 lb)
Medal record
Women's basketball
Representing Bulgaria
Olympic Games
Silver medal – second place	1980 Moscow	Team competition
European Championships
Silver medal – second place	1983 Hungary	Team competition
Silver medal – second place	1985 Italy	Team competition
Bronze medal – third place	1989 Bulgaria	Team competition

Kostadinka Radkova (Bulgarian: Костадинка Радкова; born 26 June 1962) is a Bulgarian former basketball player who competed in the 1980 Summer Olympics and in the 1988 Summer Olympics.
