= Nina Khadzhiyankova =

Bulgarian basketball player

Personal information
- Born: 18 September 1963 (age 62) Plovdiv, Bulgaria
- Height: 174 cm (5 ft 9 in)
- Weight: 96 kg (212 lb)
Medal record
Women's basketball
Representing Bulgaria
European Championships
Silver medal – second place	1985 Italy	Team competition
Bronze medal – third place	1989 Bulgaria	Team competition

Nina Khadzhiyankova (also spelled Hadjiankova, born 18 September 1963), also known as Nina Todorova, is a Bulgarian basketball player. She competed in the women's tournament at the 1988 Summer Olympics.
