= Gulyás (surname) =

Gulyás is a surname. Notable people with the surname include:

- Ákos Gulyás (born 1942), Hungarian swimmer
- Balázs Gulyás (born 1956), Hungarian neurobiologist
- Éva Gulyás (born 1955), Hungarian basketball player
- Georg Gulyás (born 1968), Swedish classical guitarist
- Gergely Gulyás (born 1981), Hungarian jurist and politician
- Géza Gulyás (1931–2014), Hungarian footballer
- Ildikó Gulyás (born 1960), Hungarian basketball player
- István Gulyás (1931–2000), Hungarian tennis player
- István Gulyás (handballer) (born 1968), Hungarian handball coach and former player
- Magdolna Gulyás (1949–2014), Hungarian basketball player
- Márta Gulyás (born 1953), Hungarian classical pianist and professor of piano and chamber music
- Máté Gulyás (born 1988), Hungarian footballer
- Michelle Gulyás (born 2000), Hungarian modern pentathlete and police detective
- Péter Gulyás (born 1984), Hungarian handballer
- Rick Gulyas (born 1952), Canadian former ski jumper
- Roland Gulyás (born 1997), Hungarian singer
