= Swimming at the 1980 Summer Olympics – Men's 200 metre breaststroke =

Men's 200 metre breaststroke at the Games of the XXII Olympiad
- Venue: Swimming Pool at the Olimpiysky Sports Complex
- Date: 26 July
- Competitors: 20 from 14 nations
- Winning time: 2:15.85

Medalists
1st place, gold medalist(s)		Robertas Žulpa	Soviet Union
2nd place, silver medalist(s)		Albán Vermes	Hungary
3rd place, bronze medalist(s)		Arsens Miskarovs	Soviet Union

The men's 200 metre butterfly event at the 1980 Summer Olympics was held on 26 July at the Swimming Pool at the Olimpiysky Sports Complex.

== Records ==
Prior to this competition, the existing world and Olympic records were as follows.

World record	David Wilkie (GBR)	2:15.11	Montreal, Canada	18 July 1976
Olympic record	David Wilkie (GBR)	2:15.11	Montreal, Canada	18 July 1976

== Results ==
=== Heats ===
Rank	Heat	Name	Nationality	Time	Notes
1	3	Robertas Žulpa	Soviet Union	2:17.83	Q
2	1	Arsens Miskarovs	Soviet Union	2:19.57	Q
3	2	Albán Vermes	Hungary	2:20.62	Q
4	2	Lindsay Spencer	Australia	2:21.08	Q
5	2	Gennady Utenkov	Soviet Union	2:21.17	Q
6	3	Duncan Goodhew	Great Britain	2:21.25	Q
7	3	Peter Berggren	Sweden	2:22.09	Q
8	1	Jörg Walter	East Germany	2:23.19	Q
9	2	Pablo Restrepo	Colombia	2:23.74	
10	3	János Dzvonyár	Hungary	2:24.43	
11	1	Glen Christiansen	Sweden	2:26.00	
12	1	Peter Evans	Australia	2:26.62	
13	1	Gustavo Torrijos	Spain	2:26.96	
14	1	Albert Boonstra	Netherlands	2:27.21	
15	3	Helmut Levy	Colombia	2:27.94	
16	3	Martii Järventaus	Finland	2:28.04	
17	2	Andrey Aguilar	Costa Rica	2:33.19	
18	2	Trần Dương Tài	Vietnam	2:38.52	
19	3	Djamel Yahiouche	Algeria	2:41.65	
	2	Miguel Santisteban	Mexico	DSQ	

=== Final ===
Rank	Name	Nationality	Time	Notes
1st place, gold medalist(s)	Robertas Žulpa	Soviet Union	2:15.85	
2nd place, silver medalist(s)	Albán Vermes	Hungary	2:16.93	
3rd place, bronze medalist(s)	Arsens Miskarovs	Soviet Union	2:17.28	
4	Gennady Utenkov	Soviet Union	2:19.64	
5	Lindsay Spencer	Australia	2:19.68	
6	Duncan Goodhew	Great Britain	2:20.92	
7	Peter Berggren	Sweden	2:21.39	
8	Jörg Walter	East Germany	2:22.39	
