= Chobanov =

Chobanov (Bulgarian: Чобанов) is a Bulgarian masculine surname, its feminine counterpart is Chobanova. The surname may refer to the following notable people:

- Mariana Chobanova (born 1965), Bulgarian basketball player
- Petko Chobanov (born 1956), Bulgarian university administrator
