= Llanes (surname) =

Llanes is a Spanish surname. Notable people with the surname include:

- Eddie Llanes Guerrero (1967–2005), American professional wrestler
- Enrique Llanes (1919–2004), Mexican wrestler
- Francisco Llanes (born 2002), Uruguayan tennis player
- Germán Llanes (born 1968), Argentine rugby union player
- Héctor Guerrero Llanes (born 1954), Mexican American commentator and professional wrestler
- Josefa Llanes Escoda (1898–1945), Filipino civic leader and a social worker, founder of the Girl Scouts of the Philippines
- Juan Llanes (born 1958), Cuban handball player
- Orlando Castro Llanes (1925–2014), Venezuelan businessman
- Rachel Llanes (born 1991), American ice hockey player
- Ramón Pacheco Llanes (born 1954), Mexican politician
- Tara Llanes (born 1976), Bicycle Motocross (BMX) racer
- Yerisbel Miranda Llanes (born 1987), Cuban chess player
