= Draghetti =

Draghetti is a surname. Notable people with the surname include:

- Marinella Draghetti (born 1961), Italian basketball player
- Roberto Draghetti (1960–2020), Italian actor and voice actor
