= EuroBasket Women 1985 squads =

== Group A ==
=== Bulgaria ===
Bulgaria roster
Players
Coaches

Pos.	No.	Name	Age – Date of birth	Height	Club
		Radostina Bontsheva Dimitrova	18 – 17 May 1967
		Sylvia Guermanova	26 – 19 July 1959
		Mariana Nikolova	22 – 31 October 1962
		Mariana Ilieva	18 – 30 March 1967
		Kostadinka Radkova	23 – 27 June 1962
		Larisa Sachova Spasova	25 – 22 August 1960
		Madlena Staneva	22 – 1 June 1963
		Polina Petrova Tzekova	17 – 30 April 1968
		Nina Hadjiankova	21 – 18 September 1963
		Krasimira Banova	24 – 5 October 1960
		Mariyana Kirilova Kostourkova	19 – 13 September 1965

=== Czechoslovakia ===
Czechoslovakia roster
Players
Coaches

Pos.	No.	Name	Age – Date of birth	Height	Club
		Zdena Adamcovà	26 – 11 May 1959
		Zora Brziaková	21 – 14 March 1964
		Zuzana Hájková	22 – 15 January 1963
		Svatava Kysilková	20 – 29 December 1964
		Hana Bruhova	25 – 24 May 1960
		Ivana Petrzelova	22 – 10 August 1963
		Hana Zarevúcká	24 – 3 March 1961
		Jana Chlebowczykova	22 – 22 April 1963
		Irena Rajniakova	29 – 24 May 1956
		Eva Blazková	20 – 3 May 1965
		Irena Lednicka	19 – 17 January 1966
		Anna Kotocová	17 – 6 April 1968

=== Yugoslavia ===
Yugoslavia roster
Players
Coaches

Pos.	No.	Name	Age – Date of birth	Height	Club
	4	Stojna Vangelovska	21 – 5 February 1964
	5	Andreja Pukšić	19 – 11 November 1965
	6	Jelica Komnenović	25 – 16 April 1960
	7	Jasna Pepeunik	26 – 19 August 1959
	8	Zeljana Listes	19 – 7 July 1966
	9	Jasminka Alić	20 – 12 August 1965
	10	Slađana Golić	25 – 12 February 1960
	11	Polona Dornik	22 – 20 November 1962
	12	Zagorka Počeković	20 – 27 January 1965
	13	Jasmina Perazić	24 – 6 December 1960
	14	Snežana Božinović	21 – 23 December 1963
	15	Razija Mujanović	18 – 15 April 1967

Head coach

Milan Vasojević

== Group B ==
=== Soviet Union ===
Soviet Union roster
Players
Coaches

Pos.	No.	Name	Age – Date of birth	Height	Club
	4	Ramune-Neringa Shidlauskaite	24 – 28 June 1961
	5	Vitalija Tuomaitė	20 – 22 November 1964
	6	Olessia Barel	25 – 9 February 1960
	7	Tatiana Belochapko	27 – 27 March 1958
	8	Olga Burjakina	27 – 17 March 1958
	9	Olga Yakovleva	21 – 15 December 1963
	10	Uliana Semjonova	33 – 9 March 1952
	11	Tatiana Komarova	22 – 30 January 1963
	12	Elena Chausova	28 – 30 July 1957
	13	Olga Sukharnova	30 – 14 February 1955
	14	Larisa Kuriksha	–
	15	Galina Savitskaia	24 – 13 July 1961

=== Hungary ===
Hungary roster
Players
Coaches

Pos.	No.	Name	Age – Date of birth	Height	Club
		Judit Balogh	17 – 16 March 1968
		Eva Diosadi-Deàk	24 – 13 January 1961
		Mária Dezsi	23 – 29 April 1962
		Anna Farkas	21 – 12 April 1964
		Ildiko Gulyàs	24 – 18 October 1960
		Gyöngyi Farkasné Körmendi	25 – 24 January 1960
		Zsuzsanna Kranjecz	21 – 17 July 1964
		Dorottya Petone Nagy	17 – 15 April 1968
		Judit Szöllösy	23 – 30 September 1961
		Zsuzsa Boksay	24 – 13 October 1960
		Agnes Nemeth	23 – 22 September 1961
		Ágnes Borka	26 – 19 July 1959

=== Poland ===
Poland roster
Players
Coaches

Pos.	No.	Name	Age – Date of birth	Height	Club
		Ludmila Janowska	30 – 23 December 1954
		Elzbieta Cala	24 – 8 June 1961
		Teresa Kepka	26 – 3 September 1959
		Wieslawa Piotrkiewskicz	24 – 23 January 1961
		Bozena Sedzicka	27 – 27 September 1957
		Grazyna Seweryn	25 – 14 November 1959
		Marta Starowicz	25 – 1 June 1960
		Malgorzata Czerlonko	21 – 11 December 1963
		Anna Jelonek	23 – 10 January 1962
		Malgorzata Kujowa	23 – 21 January 1962
		Jadwiga Glebska	25 – 9 February 1960
		Mariola Pawlak	24 – 7 July 1961
