= Roberto Ramírez =

Roberto Ramírez may refer to:

- Roberto Ramírez (field hockey) (born 1957), Cuban Olympic hockey player
- Roberto Ramírez (footballer) (born 1996), Argentine footballer
- Roberto Ramírez (pitcher) (born 1972), Mexican pitcher
- Roberto Ramirez (politician) (born 1950), American politician
