= Rodolfo Delgado =

Rodolfo Delgado may refer to:

- Rodolfo Delgado (field hockey), Cuban field hockey player at the 1980 Summer Olympics
- Rodolfo Delgado (lawyer), Attorney General of El Salvador (2021–present)
- Rodolfo Delgado (politician), President of the Chamber of Deputies of Mexico (1938)
- Sebastião Rodolfo Dalgado, Portuguese Roman Catholic priest

== Other uses ==
- Rodolfo Aguilar Delgado, corregimiento of Panama
