= Medgyesi =

Medgyesi is a Hungarian surname, where Medgyes is a Hungarian name of Mediaș. Notable people with the surname include:

- Fruzsina Medgyesi (born 1999), Hungarian figure skater
- Judit Medgyesi (born 1956), Hungarian basketball player

== See also ==
- Medgyes (surname)
- Péter Medgyessy
