= Silviya Germanova =

Bulgarian basketball player

Personal information
- Born: 19 July 1959 (age 66) Gotse Delchev
- Height: 182 cm (6 ft 0 in)
- Weight: 75 kg (165 lb)
Medal record
Women's basketball
Representing Bulgaria
Olympic Games
Silver medal – second place	1980 Moscow	Team competition
European Championships
Silver medal – second place	1985 Italy	Team competition

Silviya Germanova (Bulgarian: Силвия Германова; also transliterated as Silvia or Sylvia, born 19 July 1959) is a Bulgarian former basketball player who competed in the 1980 Summer Olympics.
