= Gulyás =

Gulyás may refer to:

- Gulyás (surname), a surname
- Gulyás (herdsman), a Hungarian cattle-herdsman
- Goulash, a Hungarian soup or stew
- Gulyásleves, a Hungarian soup
