= Zsuzsa Boksay =

Hungarian basketball player (born 1960)

Personal information
- Born: 13 October 1960 (age 65) Budapest, Hungary
- Height: 183 cm (6 ft 0 in)
- Weight: 75 kg (165 lb)
Medal record
Women's basketball
Representing Bulgaria
European Championships
Bronze medal – third place	1983 Hungary	Team competition
Bronze medal – third place	1985 Italy	Team competition
Bronze medal – third place	1987 Spain	Team competition

Zsuzsa Boksay (born 13 October 1960) is a Hungarian basketball player. She competed in the women's tournament at the 1980 Summer Olympics.
