= Shilpi Somaya Gowda =

Canadian author

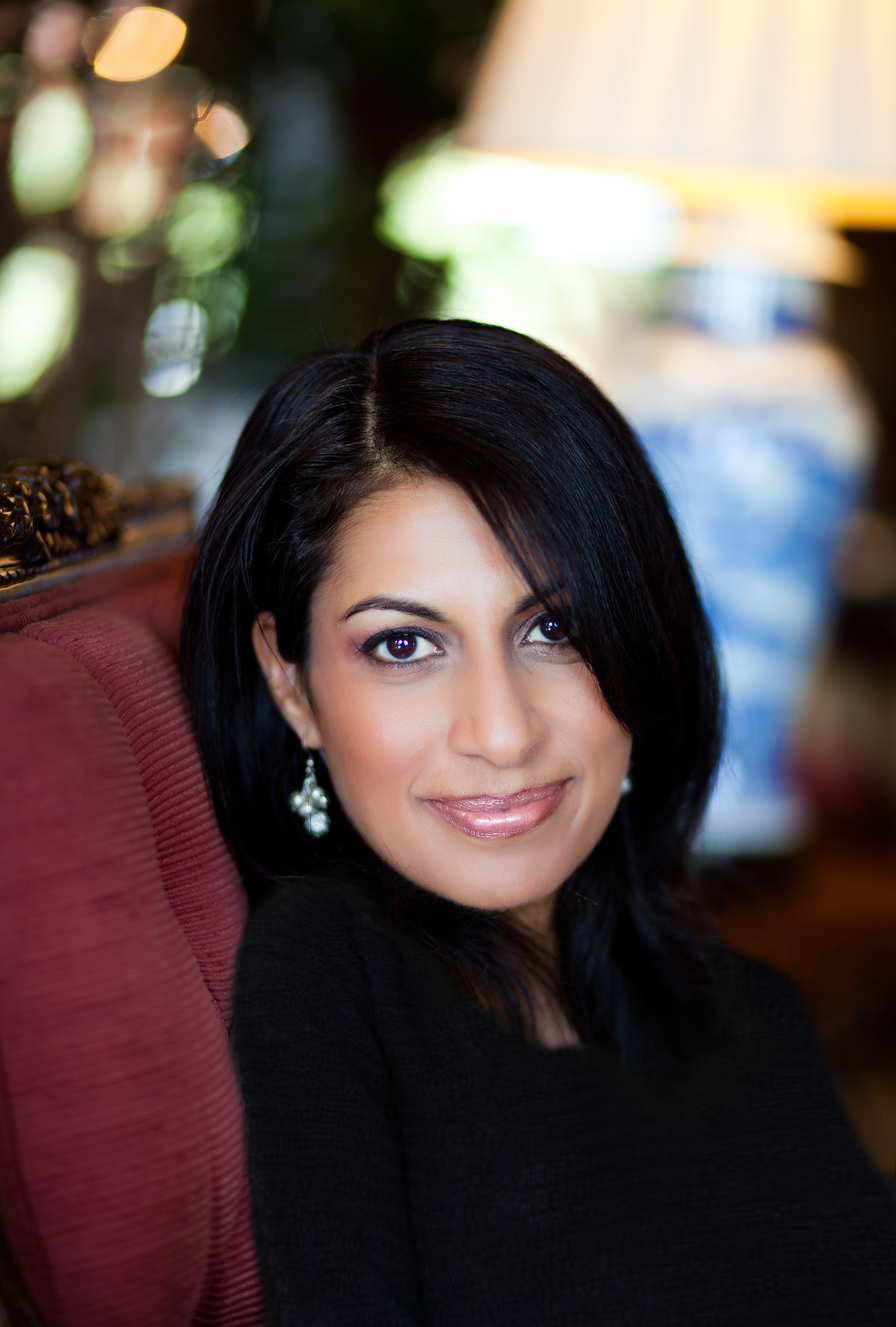

Shilpi Somaya Gowda is the award-winning, New York Times and internationally bestselling Canadian author of Secret Daughter, The Golden Son, The Shape of Family, and A Great Country. She lives in California with her family.

She was born in 1970 and raised in Toronto, Ontario, Canada. In college, she spent a summer as a volunteer in an Indian orphanage, which seeded the idea for her first novel, Secret Daughter, published in 2010. It was a New York Times and #1 international bestseller, and was translated into over 30 languages. Secret Daughter was shortlisted for the South African Boeke Literary Prize, longlisted for the International Dublin Literary Award, was an IndieNext Great Read, a Target Book Club Pick, a ChaptersIndigo Heather's Pick, and an Amnesty International Book Club Pick.

Her second novel, The Golden Son, was published in 2015-16 around the world, was a #1 international bestseller, a Target Book Club Pick, a Costco Buyer's Pick, and was awarded the French literary prize, Prix des Lyceens Folio. Her first two novels have sold over two million copies worldwide, her third novel, The Shape of Family, was published in October 2019 in Canada and March 2020 in the U.S. Her fourth novel. A Great Country, was published in 2024. It is described as a "propulsive contemporary novel exploring the ties and fractures of a close-knit Indian-American family in the aftermath of a violent encounter with the police."

== Education ==
Gowda holds an MBA from Stanford University, and a bachelor's degree in Economics from the University of North Carolina at Chapel Hill, where she was a Morehead-Cain scholar. She has served on the Advisory Board of the Children's Defense Fund, and is a Patron of Childhaven International, the organization for which she volunteered in India.

== Career ==
=== Novels ===
==== Secret Daughter ====
Gowda's debut novel was published by HarperCollins/William Morrow in 2010 and became a New York Times bestseller and a #1 international bestseller. It was translated into more than 30 languages and became a bestseller in several foreign countries, in addition to the US and Canada. The story was inspired by Gowda's experience volunteering at an orphanage in India during a summer in college, and explores the repercussions of female infanticide that is prevalent in many parts of Asia. It features a girl born in an Indian village, unwanted because of her gender, who is later adopted by a professional couple in California. The novel traces the lives of the girl, both her biological and her adoptive families over two decades.

The Washington Post said of the novel, A nuanced coming-of-age story that is faithful to the economic and emotional realities of two very different cultures. ... As the author moves among the perspectives of her various characters, she gives full weight to the humanity of each and views the problems of poverty and affluence with equal empathy. ... Gowda doesn't neaten up the messy complications of family life as she warmly affirms the power of love to help people grow and change.

Secret Daughter was shortlisted for the South African Boeke Literary Prize, longlisted for the International Dublin Literary Award, was an IndieNext Great Read, a Target Book Club Pick, a ChaptersIndigo Heather's Pick, an Amazon Customer Favorite & Editor's Choice of 2010, and an Amnesty International Book Club Pick. The novel was the #1 Bestselling Book of 2010 in Canada, and the #2 Bestselling Canadian book of the decade (2010–19).

==== The Golden Son ====
Gowda's second novel was published in 2015-16 around the world, and it too became a #1 international bestseller. The story features two childhood friends who grow up in the same village in India, but whose paths diverge when Anil goes to America to pursue his dream of becoming a doctor, while Leena moves to a neighboring village to have an arranged marriage.

Marisa de los Santos, New York Times bestselling author of Belong to Me and The Precious One, commented on The Golden Son, saying, Shilpi Somaya Gowda "is as adept at crafting disparate, fully realized worlds—a village in India, a medical school in Texas—as she is at creating compelling characters. I ached and cheered for Leena and Anil, as they struggle to live lives of their own choosing amidst the demands of tradition and the sometimes beautiful, sometimes painful bonds of family."

The Golden Son was the winner of the French literary prize Prix des Lyceens Folio, #1 on the Canadian Fiction bestseller list in both of Canada's national newspapers (The Globe & Mail and Toronto Star), a Target Book Club Pick for December 2016, a Costco Canada Buyers’ Pick, and on the USA Today bestseller list.

==== The Shape of Family ====
Gowda's third novel was published in October 2019, again by HarperCollins/William Morrow. The Shape of Family was listed as a "Most Anticipated Book" by CBC Books, Chatelaine magazine, ChaptersIndigo, The Philadelphia Inquirer, Library Journal and Vancouver Public Library. "The Golden Son" has been named an International Bestseller, Los Angeles Times Bestseller, Target Recommends Pick, and Best Book by: USA Today, New York Post, CBC, ChaptersIndigo, Ms. magazine, and Library Journal.

A Great Country

Gowda's fourth novel, A Great Country, was released on March 26, 2024. In it, Gowda explores immigration, class tensions and generational conflict. The story follows the Shahs, a close-knit Indian American family adjusting to their new life in Pacific Hills, a fictional, affluent neighborhood in Southern California.

== Honors and awards ==
=== Secret Daughter ===
- Long-listed for the IMPAC Dublin International Literary Award
- Short-listed for the South African Boeke Literary Prize
- Amnesty International Book Club Selection (2015)
- IndieNEXT Great Read, April 2010 (American Booksellers' Association)
- Target Club Pick (April 2011)
- ChaptersIndigo -Heather's Pick
- Amazon Customer Favorite & Editor's Choice of 2010
- Vancouver Sun (Top 10 Books of 2010)
- #1 Bestselling Book of 2010 in Canada
- Bestseller Lists: US (New York Times, USA Today, IndieBound), Canada, Norway, Germany, Israel, Poland, Malaysia

=== The Golden Son ===
- Winner of the French literary prize Prix des Lyceens Folio
- Target Book Club Pick for December 2016
- Costco Canada Buyers’ Pick
- USA Today bestseller list
- #1 on the Canadian Fiction bestseller list in both of Canada's national newspapers (The Globe & Mail and Toronto Star)

=== The Shape of Family ===
- Selected as a “Target Recommends” Book
- #2 on LA Times Bestseller List (4/19/20)
- Named one of USA Today’s 5 Books Not to Miss
- "10 new books from Emily St. John Mandel, Harlan Coben, Jack Fredrickson, James Rollins, Hilary Mantel, more". Chicago Sun-Times. March 24, 2020.
- Selected by New York Post as a Top Book of the Week
- Globe & Mail national bestseller list from 2019-2020
- Toronto Star national bestseller List 2019-2020

=== A Great Country ===
- Chapters/Indigo - #2 Best Book of 2024 So Far
- Globe & Mail - Instant #1 Canadian Fiction Bestseller
- Amazon - 10 Best Books of the Month, April 2024
- Chapters/Indigo - Heather's Pick
- Chapters/Indigo - Author of the Month, April 2024
- Costco Canada - Spotlight Book Pick, April 2024
- Publishers’ Weekly Starred Review
- Publishers’ Weekly Author Profile
- Cosmopolitan - 20 Best New Books of Spring 2024
- Real Simple - Best Books of 2024
- Reader’s Digest - Most Anticipated Books 2024
- Elle Magazine - Best Books of 2024
- Conde Nast Traveler - Book Club Pick
- Chatelaine - Best Books Spring 2024
- San Diego Union-Tribune - Top 10 Books of Spring 2024
- Goodreads - Editors' March Book Pick

== Works ==
=== Novels ===
- —— (2010). Secret Daughter (hardcover 1st ed.). William Morrow. ISBN 9780061922312.
- —— (2015). The Golden Son (hardcover 1st ed.). HarperAvenue. ISBN 9781443446792.
- —— (2019). The Shape of Family (hardcover 1st ed.). HarperCollins. ISBN 9781443458979.
- —— (2024). A Great Country (hardcover 1st ed.). Mariner Books. ISBN 9780063324343.
