= Tatyana Ivinskaya =

Soviet Belarusian basketball player

Personal information
- Born: 27 March 1958 (age 68) Vitebsk, Byelorussian SSR, Soviet Union
- Height: 185 cm (6 ft 1 in)
- Weight: 80 kg (176 lb)
Medal record
Women's basketball
Representing the Soviet Union
Olympic Games
| Gold medal – first place | 1980 Moscow | Team competition |
European Championships
| Gold medal – first place | 1985 Italy | Team competition |

Tatyana Mikhaylovna Ivinskaya (Belarusian: Таццяна Міхайлаўна Іві́нская, Russian: Татьяна Михайловна Ивинская, born 27 March 1958), known as Tatyana Ivinskaya or Tatyana Beloshapko, is a Belarusian former basketball player who competed for the Soviet Union at the 1980 Summer Olympics.
