= Gennady Utenkov =

Soviet swimmer

Personal information
- Born: 1 May 1960 (age 66)

Sport
- Sport: Swimming
Medal record
Representing Soviet Union
Summer Universiade
Bronze medal – third place	1983 Edmonton	200m breaststroke

Gennady Utenkov (born 1 May 1960) is a Soviet swimmer. He competed in the men's 200 metre breaststroke at the 1980 Summer Olympics.
