= Ágnes Németh =

Hungarian basketball player (born 1961)

Personal information
- Born: 22 September 1961 (age 64) Zirc, Hungary
- Height: 185 cm (6 ft 1 in)
- Weight: 73 kg (161 lb)
Medal record
Women's basketball
Representing Bulgaria
European Championships
Bronze medal – third place	1983 Hungary	Team competition
Bronze medal – third place	1985 Italy	Team competition
Bronze medal – third place	1987 Spain	Team competition
Bronze medal – third place	1991 Israel	Team competition

Ágnes Németh (born 22 September 1961) is a Hungarian basketball player. She competed in the women's tournament at the 1980 Summer Olympics.
