= Burgas Free University =

University in Burgas, Bulgaria

- Бургаски свободен университет
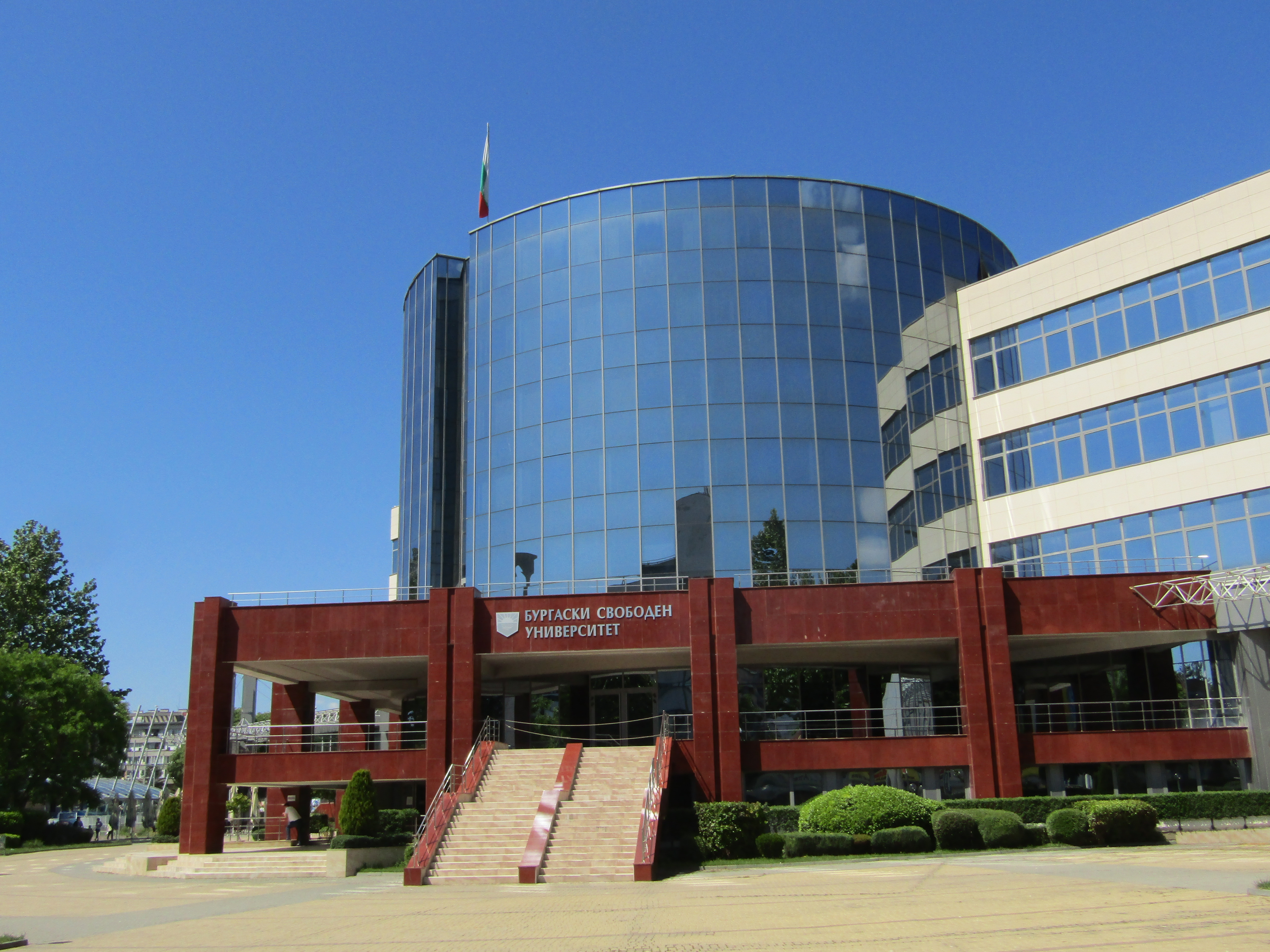
- Type: Private
- Established: September 18, 1991; 34 years ago
- Affiliations: Balkan Universities Network
- President: prof. Petko Chobanov, PhD
- Rector: prof. Milen Baltov, PhD
- Location: Burgas, Bulgaria
- Website: https://www.bfu.bg/bg

Burgas Free University (BFU) is a private university located in Burgas, Bulgaria. It is one of the first non-state universities in Bulgaria, established in the industrial and cultural centеr in the south-eastern region of the country, Burgas.

== University management ==
- President: Prof. Petko Chobanov, PhD
- Rector: Prof. Milen Baltov, PhD
- Vice-Rector: Prof. Mariya Alexieva, PhD
- Deputy Rector of Academic Affairs and Accreditation: Darina Dimitrova

== Faculty ==
- Faculty of Legal Studies
- Faculty of Business Studies
- Faculty of Computer Science and Engineering
- Faculty of Humanities

== Admission ==
Burgas Free University offers admission to Bachelor's, Master's and Doctoral programs in specialties imposed in practice and guaranteeing successful professional realization.

== Statute ==
Burgas Free University /BFU/ was established with an Act of The Great National Assembly on 18 September 1991, and is one of the first non-state universities in the country.

- BFU is a member of the European Universities Association /EUA/.
- It has signed Agreements of Cooperation with 36 universities and organizations in Europe, America, Asia and Africa.
- It implements students and staff exchange programmes with 24 universities in Europe.
- It participates in the ECTS.
- It works under joint international projects with more than 100 universities and organizations.
- BFU is a partner of UNESCO under the UNITWIN/UNESCO Chairs Prpgramme, and is a host institution of UNESCO Chair on Culture of Peace and Human Rights.

== Facilities ==
Its building was constructed in 2004 and has a total area of 22,500 square meters. The building of BFU was awarded the “Building of the Year” Prize for 2004 in a competition organized by the Ministry of Regional Development of Bulgaria, in the area of architecture and civil engineering, and its architect was elected “The Architect of the Year".
