= Medgyes (surname) =

Medgyes is a Hungarian surname, Hungarian name of Mediaș. Notable people with the surname include:

- Jozef Medgyes (born 1985), Slovak footballer
- Ladislas Medgyes (1892–?), Hungarian artist
- Péter Medgyes (born 1945), Hungarian professor
- Sinan Medgyes (born 1993), Slovak footballer
- Zoltán Medgyes (born 1995), Hungarian footballer

== See also ==
- Medgyesi
