= Krassimira Banova =

Bulgarian basketball player

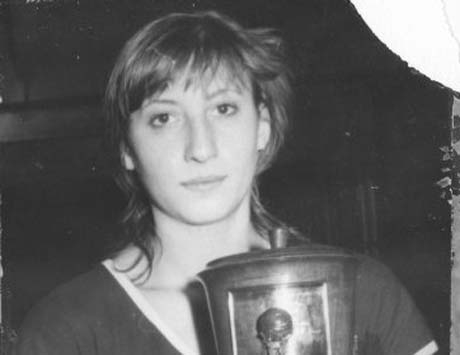
- Krassimira Banova holding the European Champions Cup in 1984

Personal information
- Born: 5 October 1960 (age 66) Dimitrovgrad, Bulgaria
- Listed height: 1.83 m (6 ft 0 in)

Career information
- Playing career: 1978–1997
- Position: Center
- Number: 15

Career history
- 1978–1990: Levski Sofia
- 1990–1991: BAC Mirande
- 1991–1995: Tarbes Gespe Bigorre
- 1995–1997: SC Kremikovtsi
Medals
Women's basketball
Representing Bulgaria
EuroBasket Women
Silver medal – second place	1983 Romania	Team competition
Silver medal – second place	1985 Italy	Team competition
EuroLeague Women
Gold medal – first place	1984	Team competition
Ronchetti Cup
Gold medal – first place	1979	Team competition

Krassimira Banova (Bulgarian: Красимира Николова Банова; born 5 October 1960) is a former Bulgarian basketball player who competed at club and international level during the late 1970s, 1980s, and early 1990s. She was a member of the Bulgarian national team for nearly a decade and part of the most successful generation in the history of Bulgarian women’s basketball.

At club level, Banova achieved her greatest success with WBC Levski Sofia, winning the European Champions Cup in 1984 and the Ronchetti Cup in 1979. Internationally, she represented Bulgaria at multiple European Championships and World Championships, earning silver medals at EuroBasket Women 1983 and EuroBasket Women 1985.

After retiring from playing, Banova worked as a basketball coach and later became a referee for the Bulgarian Basketball Federation. Her daughter, Jaklin Zlatanova, is also a professional basketball player.

== Early life ==
Krassimira Banova was born on 5 October 1960 in Dimitrovgrad, Bulgaria, a town in the Thrace region near the provincial center of Haskovo. She spent most of her childhood there before her family later moved to the capital, Sofia. During her early years, Banova was exposed to various sports, reflecting the widespread emphasis on organized physical activity in Bulgaria at the time.

Initially, she trained in athletics, which contributed to her physical development and coordination. Unlike many elite players of her generation, Banova began playing basketball relatively late, starting at the age of 16. Despite this delayed introduction, she progressed rapidly, demonstrating strong adaptability and work ethic.

Her transition to basketball occurred after relocating to Sofia, where she gained access to structured training and competitive opportunities. By 1978, Banova had fully committed to the sport, marking the beginning of her senior basketball career and her emergence as a promising talent within Bulgarian women’s basketball.

== Club career ==
=== Levski Sofia (1978–1990) ===
Banova spent the formative and most successful part of her club career with Levski Sofia. Joining the club in 1978, she developed into a key interior player and became part of the most successful generation in the history of Bulgarian women’s basketball.

During this period, Levski dominated domestic competitions and achieved major success at European level. Banova was a member of the squad that won the Ronchetti Cup in 1979 and later reached the pinnacle of European club basketball by winning the European Champions Cup in 1984.

=== International career (1990–1995) ===
In the early 1990s, Banova continued her career abroad, playing in France during a period when many Eastern European players moved to Western European leagues. She represented BAC Mirande during the 1990–1991 season before joining Tarbes Gespe Bigorre, where she played until 1995.

Her years in France marked an important stage of her career, allowing her to compete at a high professional level outside Bulgaria and extend her playing career during a time of major transition in European basketball.

=== Final playing years (1995–1997) ===
After returning to Bulgaria, Banova spent the final years of her playing career with SC Kremikovtsi. She retired from professional basketball in 1997, bringing to a close a career that spanned nearly two decades at both domestic and international level.

== National team career ==
Krassimira Banova played for the Bulgarian national team for nearly a decade, from 1980 to 1990. She made her senior debut in 1980 at the European Championship and went on to participate in four EuroBasket Women tournaments, two World Championships, and one Olympic qualification tournament.

Her major international results include:

- 4th place – EuroBasket Women 1980
- EuroBasket Women 1983
- EuroBasket Women 1985
- 7th place – 1986 FIBA World Championship for Women
- 9th place – EuroBasket Women 1987
- 8th place – 1990 FIBA World Championship for Women

Banova represented the Bulgarian national team throughout the 1980s, taking part in multiple European Championships, World Championships, and Olympic qualification tournaments. She was a regular member of the senior squad during one of the most competitive periods in the history of Bulgarian women’s basketball.

Her first major international success came at the 1983 European Championship in Hungary, where Bulgaria advanced to the final and won the silver medal. Banova played six games in the tournament, averaging 9 points per game, and recorded one of the standout individual performances of the competition by scoring 32 points against Sweden.

Banova continued to play a key role in Bulgaria’s international campaigns over the following years. At the 1985 European Championship in Italy, she emerged as one of the tournament’s leading scorers, averaging 17.4 points per game and scoring 27 points in the final against the Soviet Union, as Bulgaria again finished with the silver medal.

In addition to her European Championship appearances, Banova represented Bulgaria at the 1986 World Championship in the Soviet Union and the 1990 World Championship, where Bulgaria finished seventh and eighth respectively. She also participated in the 1984 World Olympic Qualification Tournament for Women, contributing to Bulgaria’s qualification campaign for the Los Angeles Olympic Games.

=== Senior national team statistics ===
The following table summarizes Krassimira Banova’s appearances and statistical output for the Bulgarian senior national team in major international tournaments, as recorded by FIBA.

Bulgarian senior national team statistics
Year	Competition	Host nation	Games played	Points per game	Free throw %
1980	EuroBasket Women	(Socialist Federal Republic of Yugoslavia) Yugoslavia	–	–	–
1983	EuroBasket Women	Hungary	6	9.0	75.0
1984	World Olympic Qualification Tournament	Cuba	3	9.0	75.0
1985	EuroBasket Women	Italy	7	17.4	74.1
1986	FIBA World Championship for Women	Soviet Union	7	12.9	82.9
1987	EuroBasket Women	Spain	7	15.7	86.5
1990	FIBA World Championship for Women	Malaysia	8	–	–

== Post-playing career ==
After retiring from professional basketball in the late 1990s, Banova transitioned into coaching and youth development. She worked with several Bulgarian clubs at both youth and senior levels, achieving notable success as a coach.

In 1999, Banova won the Bulgarian championship with SC Kremikovtsi in the girls’ category. During the early 2000s, she continued her coaching career with Levski-Spartak, where her teams finished second in the Bulgarian State Championship in 2003 in both the girls’ and junior girls’ competitions.

Between 2004 and 2011, Banova was closely associated with Rilski Sportist, coaching teams across multiple age groups. Her achievements with the club included a Bulgarian championship title in 2004 with the cadet girls, national titles in 2005 and 2006 in the girls’ and mini-basketball categories, and podium finishes in the women’s competitions. In the 2006–07 season, Banova worked as an assistant coach at the French club Tarbes Gespe Bigorre, gaining experience at club level in one of Europe’s top women’s basketball leagues.. In 2011, she led Rilski Sportist to the championship title in the Bulgarian A Group (second division) with the women’s team.

In parallel with her coaching work, Banova remained active within Bulgarian basketball as an official and later served as a referee under the Bulgarian Basketball Federation.
