= Miguel López (footballer, born 1949) =

Cuban footballer

Personal information
- Full name: Miguel López González
- Date of birth: 24 September 1949 (age 77)
- Height: 1.77 m (5 ft 10 in)
- Position: Defender

Senior career*
Years	Team	Apps	(Gls)
- Ciudad La Habana

International career
- Cuba
- * Club domestic league appearances and goals

Miguel López González (born 24 September 1949) is a Cuban footballer. He competed in the men's tournament at the 1980 Summer Olympics.
