= Miguel Izquierdo =

Cuban handball player (born 1953)

Personal information
- Nationality: Cuban
- Born: 17 November 1953 (age 71)

Sport
- Sport: Handball

Miguel Izquierdo (born 17 November 1953) is a Cuban handball player. He competed in the men's tournament at the 1980 Summer Olympics.
