= Erzsébet Pálinkás-Varga =

Hungarian volleyball player (born 1959)

Personal information
- Nationality: Hungarian
- Born: 5 April 1959 (age 65); Innsbruck, Austria

Sport
- Sport: Volleyball

Erzsébet Pálinkás-Varga (born 5 April 1959) is a Hungarian volleyball player. She competed in the women's tournament at the 1980 Summer Olympics.
