= Ricardo Leyva =

Cuban volleyball player

Personal information
- Nationality: Cuban
- Born: 3 June 1956 (age 70)
- Height: 1.93 m (6 ft 4 in)

Volleyball information
- Number: 5

National team
1980–1983	Cuba
Honours
Men's volleyball
Representing Cuba
Pan American Games
Silver medal – second place	1983 Caracas	Team
Central American and Caribbean Games
Gold medal – first place	1982 Havana	Team

Ricardo Leyva (born 3 June 1956) is a retired Cuban volleyball player. He competed in the men's tournament at the 1980 Summer Olympics in Moscow. He helped Cuba win the silver medal at the 1983 Pan American Games in Caracas.
