= Roberta Faccin =

Italian basketball player (born 1957)

Personal information
- Nationality: Italian
- Born: 28 April 1957 (age 67); Ivrea, Italy

Sport
- Sport: Basketball

Roberta Faccin (born 28 April 1957) is an Italian basketball player. She competed in the women's tournament at the 1980 Summer Olympics.
