= Albán Vermes =

Hungarian swimmer (1957–2021)

Personal information
- Nationality: Hungarian
- Born: 19 June 1957 Eger, Hungarian People's Republic
- Died: 3 February 2021 (aged 63)

Sport
- Sport: Swimming
Medal record
Men's swimming
Representing Hungary
Olympic Games
Silver medal – second place	1980 Moscow	200 m breaststroke
European Championships
Silver medal – second place	1983 Rome	200 m breaststroke
Friendship Games
Bronze medal – third place	1984 Moscow	200 metre breaststroke

Albán Vermes (19 June 1957 – 3 February 2021) was a Hungarian swimmer and Olympic medalist. He participated at the 1980 Summer Olympics, winning a silver medal in 200 metre breaststroke.

Albán Vermes died on 3 February 2021, aged 63.
