= Károly Némedi =

Hungarian diver

Personal information
- Nationality: Hungarian
- Born: 16 January 1960 (age 65); Budapest, Hungary

Sport
- Sport: Diving

Károly Némedi (born 16 January 1960) is a Hungarian diver. He competed in two events at the 1980 Summer Olympics.
