= Kaninga Mbambi =

Congolese basketball player

Personal information
- Nationality: Congolese
- Born: 6 November 1971 (age 53); Kinshasa, Zaire

Sport
- Sport: Basketball

Kaninga Mbambi (born 6 November 1971) is a Congolese basketball player. She competed in the women's tournament at the 1996 Summer Olympics.
