= Ágnes Fodor =

Hungarian swimmer

Personal information
- Born: 31 March 1964 (age 62) Eger, Hungary

Sport
- Sport: Swimming

Ágnes Fodor (born 31 March 1964) is a Hungarian backstroke swimmer. She competed in three events at the 1980 Summer Olympics.
