= Mariangela Piancastelli =

Italian basketball player (born 1953)

Personal information
- Nationality: Italian
- Born: 20 May 1953 (age 71); Ferrara, Italy

Sport
- Sport: Basketball

Mariangela Piancastelli (born 20 May 1953) is an Italian basketball player. She competed in the women's tournament at the 1980 Summer Olympics.
