= Antonietta Baistrocchi =

Italian basketball player (1955–1994)

Personal information
- Nationality: Italian
- Born: 4 July 1955; Rome, Italy
- Died: 8 June 1994 (aged 38); Rome, Italy

Sport
- Sport: Basketball

Antonietta Baistrocchi (4 July 1955 – 8 June 1994) was an Italian basketball player. She competed in the women's tournament at the 1980 Summer Olympics.
