= Pedro Hernández (fencer) =

Cuban fencer (born 1955)

Personal information
- Born: 19 March 1955 (age 71)

Sport
- Sport: Fencing

Pedro Hernández (born 19 March 1955) is a Cuban fencer. He competed at the 1976 and 1980 Summer Olympics.
