= Raimundo Frometa =

Cuban footballer

Personal information
- Full name: Raimundo Roberto Frometa Carrión
- Date of birth: 15 June 1955
- Date of death: 26 June 2024 (aged 69)
- Height: 1.75 m (5 ft 9 in)
- Position: Defender

Senior career*
Years	Team	Apps	(Gls)
- Santiago de Cuba

International career
- Cuba
- * Club domestic league appearances and goals

Raimundo Roberto Frometa Carrión (15 June 1955 – 26 June 2024) was a Cuban footballer. He competed in the men's tournament at the 1980 Summer Olympics.
