= Juliana Szalonna =

Hungarian volleyball player (born 1959)

Personal information
- Nationality: Hungarian
- Born: 16 April 1959 (age 65); Miskolc, Hungary

Sport
- Sport: Volleyball

Juliana Szalonna (born 16 April 1959) is a Hungarian volleyball player. She competed in the women's tournament at the 1980 Summer Olympics.
