= Gábor Mészáros =

Hungarian swimmer

Personal information
- Nationality: Hungarian
- Born: 15 March 1962 (age 64) Budapest, Hungary

Sport
- Sport: Swimming

Gábor Mészáros (born 15 March 1962) is a Hungarian swimmer. He competed in four events at the 1980 Summer Olympics. He did not win any medals.
