= Lázaro Jiménez =

Cuban handball player (born 1959)

Personal information
- Nationality: Cuban
- Born: 17 December 1959 (age 65)

Sport
- Sport: Handball

Lázaro Jiménez (born 17 December 1959) is a Cuban handball player. He competed in the men's tournament at the 1980 Summer Olympics.
