= Bianca Rossi =

Italian basketball player (born 1954)

Personal information
- Nationality: Italian
- Born: 2 May 1954 (age 70); Ponzano Veneto, Italy

Sport
- Sport: Basketball

Bianca Rossi (born 2 May 1954) is an Italian basketball player. She competed in the women's tournament at the 1980 Summer Olympics.
