= Chiara Guzzonato =

Italian basketball player (born 1956)

Personal information
- Nationality: Italian
- Born: 23 February 1956 (age 69); Cittadella, Italy

Sport
- Sport: Basketball

Chiara Guzzonato (born 23 February 1956) is an Italian basketball player. She competed in the women's tournament at the 1980 Summer Olympics.
