= Béla Nagy (archer) =

Hungarian archer (1943–2025)

Personal information
- Nationality: Hungarian
- Born: 27 July 1943 Budapest, Hungary
- Died: 15 October 2025 (aged 82)

Sport
- Sport: Archery

Béla Nagy (27 July 1943 – 15 October 2025) was a Hungarian archer. He competed at the 1972 Summer Olympics and the 1980 Summer Olympics. Nagy died on 15 October 2025, at the age of 82.
