= Adriana Chamajová =

Slovak basketball player (born 1971)

Personal information
- Nationality: Slovak
- Born: 1 February 1971 (age 54); Ružomberok, Czechoslovakia

Sport
- Country: Czechoslovakia
- Sport: Basketball

Adriana Chamajová (born 1 February 1971) is a Slovak former basketball player. She competed for Czechoslovakia in the women's tournament at the 1992 Summer Olympics.
