= Wanda Sandon =

Italian basketball player (born 1952)

Personal information
- Nationality: Italian
- Born: 1 October 1952 (age 72); Trichiana, Italy

Sport
- Sport: Basketball

Wanda Sandon (born 1 October 1952) is an Italian basketball player. She competed in the women's tournament at the 1980 Summer Olympics.
