= Lisa Ingram =

American basketball player

Lisa Ingram (born 1964) is an American basketball player. She competed at the 1983 Pan American Games, winning a gold medal, 1983 FIBA World Championship for Women, winning a silver medal, and 1984 Summer Olympics winning a gold medal.

She played for Northeast Louisiana University.
