= Radmila Vasileva =

Bulgarian basketball player

Personal information
- Nationality: Bulgarian
- Born: 5 January 1964 (age 61); Sofia, Bulgaria

Sport
- Sport: Basketball

Radmila Vasileva (Bulgarian: Радмила Василева) (born 5 January 1964) is a Bulgarian basketball player. She competed in the women's tournament at the 1988 Summer Olympics.
