= Nunziata Serradimigni =

Italian basketball player (born 1960)

Personal information
- Nationality: Italian
- Born: 8 February 1960 (age 65) Sassari, Italy

Sport
- Sport: Basketball

Nunziata Serradimigni (born 8 February 1960) is an Italian basketball player. She competed in the women's tournament at the 1980 Summer Olympics.
