= Carol Sealey =

Canadian basketball player

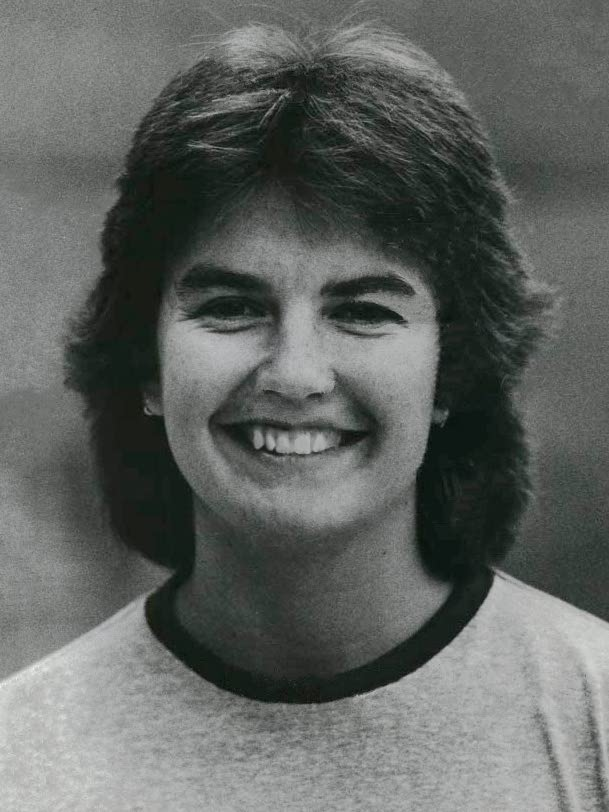

Personal information
- Born: 18 April 1959 (age 66) Montreal, Quebec, Canada
- Height: 178 cm (5 ft 10 in)
- Weight: 70 kg (154 lb)

Sport
- Sport: Basketball

Carol Jane Sealey (born 18 April 1959) is a Canadian basketball player. She competed in the women's tournament at the 1984 Summer Olympics.

Sealey has three children. After retiring from competitions she had a long career as a high school basketball coach in the United States.
