= Jörg Walter =

East German swimmer

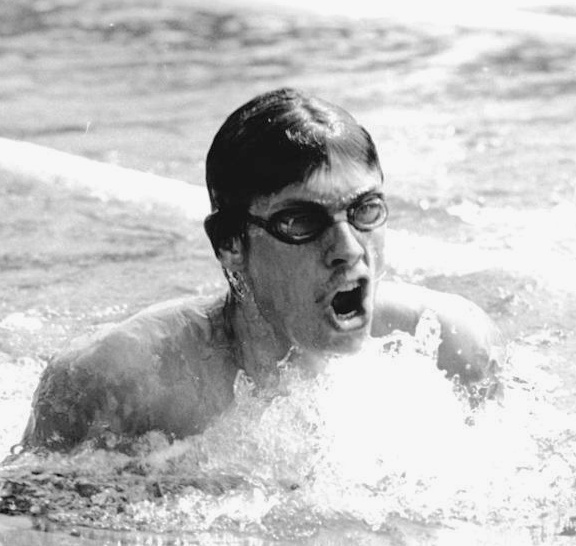
- Jörg Walter in 1979

Personal information
- Born: 30 June 1957 (age 69) Mühlhausen, East Germany
- Height: 1.89 m (6 ft 2 in)
- Weight: 80 kg (180 lb)

Sport
- Sport: Swimming
- Club: SC Turbine Erfurt

Jörg Walter (born 30 June 1957) is a retired East German swimmer. He competed at the 1980 Summer Olympics in the 100 m and 200 m breaststroke, 400 m individual medley and 4 × 100 m medley relay with the best achievement of fourth place in the relay. He also finished in fourth place in the 200 m medley at the 1977 European championships.
