= Emanuela Silimbani =

Italian basketball player (born 1959)

Personal information
- Nationality: Italian
- Born: 26 April 1959 (age 65); Faenza, Italy

Sport
- Sport: Basketball

Emanuela Silimbani (born 26 April 1959) is an Italian former basketball player. She competed in the women's tournament at the 1980 Summer Olympics.
