= Janice Trombly =

American handball player

Personal information
- Nationality: American
- Born: January 6, 1957 (age 69)

Sport
- Sport: Handball

Janice Trombly (born January 6, 1957) is an American former handball player who competed in the 1984 Summer Olympics. Apart from handball, Trombly played basketball and won gold with the American team at the 1979 FIBA World Championship for Women, and silver at the 1979 Pan American Games.
