= Pablo Pedroso =

Cuban handball player (born 1959)

Personal information
- Nationality: Cuban
- Born: 10 August 1959 (age 65)

Sport
- Sport: Handball

Pablo Pedroso (born 10 August 1959) is a Cuban handball player. He competed in the men's tournament at the 1980 Summer Olympics.
