= Marija Uzelac =

Yugoslav and Serbian basketball player

Personal information
- Born: February 22, 1958 (age 68) Kula, SFR Yugoslavia
- Listed height: 1.85 m (6 ft 1 in)
- Listed weight: 85 kg (187 lb)
- Position: Center

Marija Uzelac, (Serbian Cyrillic: Марија Узелац; born February 22, 1958, in Kula, SFR Yugoslavia) is a former Yugoslav and Serbian basketball player.
