= Orlando Cowley =

Cuban water polo player (born 1953)

Personal information
- Nationality: Cuban
- Born: 1 August 1953 (age 71)

Sport
- Sport: Water polo

Orlando Cowley (born 1 August 1953) is a Cuban water polo player. He competed at the 1972 Summer Olympics and the 1976 Summer Olympics.
