= Petko Chobanov =

Petko Chobanov (Bulgarian: Петко Чобанов; born April 20, 1956) is the president of Burgas Free University, chairman of the board of trustees of BFU., and editor-in-chief of Bulgarian Journal of Business Research.
