= Éva Miklósfalvy =

Hungarian swimmer

Personal information
- Nationality: Hungarian
- Born: 10 December 1959 (age 66) Budapest, Hungary

Sport
- Sport: Swimming

Éva Miklósfalvy (born 10 December 1959) is a Hungarian swimmer. She competed in two events at the 1980 Summer Olympics.
