= Toni Kordic =

Canadian basketball player

Personal information
- Born: 1 January 1964 (age 61) Edmonton, Alberta, Canada

Sport
- Sport: Basketball

Toni Kordic (born 1 January 1964) is a Canadian basketball player. She competed in the women's tournament at the 1984 Summer Olympics.
