= Ibrain Crombet =

Cuban handball player (born 1960)

Personal information
- Nationality: Cuban
- Born: 5 March 1960 (age 65)

Sport
- Sport: Handball

Ibrain Crombet (born 5 March 1960) is a Cuban handball player. He competed in the men's tournament at the 1980 Summer Olympics.
