= Roberto Zulueta =

Cuban handball player (born 1957)

Personal information
- Nationality: Cuban
- Born: 14 November 1957 (age 67)

Sport
- Sport: Handball

Roberto Zulueta (born 14 November 1957) is a Cuban handball player. He competed in the men's tournament at the 1980 Summer Olympics.
