= János Dzvonyár =

Hungarian swimmer

Personal information
- Born: 28 March 1961 (age 65) Debrecen, Hungary

Sport
- Sport: Swimming

János Dzvonyár (born 28 March 1961) is a Hungarian swimmer. He competed in three events at the 1980 Summer Olympics.
