= Ildikó Gulyás =

Hungarian basketball player (born 1960)

Personal information
- Born: 18 October 1960 (age 65) Budapest, Hungary
- Height: 185 cm (6 ft 1 in)
- Weight: 72 kg (159 lb)
Medal record
Women's basketball
Representing Bulgaria
European Championships
Bronze medal – third place	1985 Italy	Team competition

Ildikó Gulyás (born 18 October 1960) is a Hungarian basketball player. She competed in the women's tournament at the 1980 Summer Olympics.
