= Candi Clarkson-Lohr =

Canadian basketball player (born 1958)

Candi Clarkson-De Gazon OLY
Personal information
- Born: 30 November 1958 (age 67) Hamilton, Ontario, Canada

Sport
- Sport: Basketball

Candi Clarkson-De Gazon (née Clarkson; born 30 November 1958) (other last names, Lohr/Jirik) is a Canadian basketball player. She competed in the women's tournament at the 1984 Summer Olympics. In 2013, she was inducted into the Canada Basketball Hall of Fame. In 2014 Candace was inducted into the Ontario Basketball Hall of Fame. Candace was granted the use of the post-nominal letters of OLY by the World Olympians Association in 2023 in recognition of being an Olympian from the 1984 Olympics.

== Awards and honors ==
Inducted to Canadian Basketball Hall of Fame, Team Category, as a member of the 1979 Canadian Woman's World Championships Bronze Medallists. Class of 2024

Inducted into Ontario Basketball Hall of Fame. Class of 2014.

Inducted into Canadian Basketball Hall of Fame as Athlete, Class of 2013.

- Top 100 U Sports women's basketball Players of the Century (1920–2020).

Inducted to Brock University Hall of Fame, 1996.

Inducted to University of Guelph Hall of Fame, Sept 1987.

Named to Brantford Walk of Fame. 1984.

Bronze Medallist, 1979 Women's World Championships, Seoul, Korea.

Bronze Medallist, 1979 FISU Games, Mexico City, Mexico.

Bronze Medallist, 1979 PANAM Games, San Juan, Puerto Rico.

Four time All-Canadian, University of Guelph (1978–1980), Brock University (1983)

OFSSA Girls Basketball Gold Medallists, 1976, 1975.
