= Erzsébet Szentesi =

Hungarian basketball player

Personal information
- Nationality: Hungarian
- Born: 24 October 1953 (age 71); Miskolc, Hungary

Sport
- Sport: Basketball

Erzsébet Szentesi (born 24 October 1953) is a Hungarian basketball player. She competed in the women's tournament at the 1980 Summer Olympics.
