= Ilona Kovács =

Hungarian basketball player

Personal information
- Nationality: Hungarian
- Born: 3 July 1960 (age 66) Budapest, Hungary

Sport
- Sport: Basketball

Ilona Kovács (born 3 July 1960) is a Hungarian basketball player. She competed in the women's tournament at the 1980 Summer Olympics.
