= Marinella Draghetti =

Italian basketball player (born 1961)

Personal information
- Nationality: Italian
- Born: 5 August 1961 (age 63); Parma, Italy

Sport
- Sport: Basketball

Marinella Draghetti (born 5 August 1961) is an Italian basketball player. She competed in the women's tournament at the 1980 Summer Olympics.
