= Roberto Ramírez (field hockey) =

Cuban hockey player

Personal information
- Nationality: Cuban
- Born: 22 February 1957 (age 69)

Sport
- Sport: Field hockey

Roberto Ramírez (born 22 February 1957) is a Cuban field hockey player. He competed in the men's tournament at the 1980 Summer Olympics.
