= Györgyi Vertetics =

Hungarian basketball player

Personal information
- Nationality: Hungarian
- Born: 23 December 1953 (age 71); Budapest, Hungary

Sport
- Sport: Basketball

Györgyi Vertetics (born 23 December 1953) is a Hungarian basketball player. She competed in the women's tournament at the 1980 Summer Olympics.
