= Olivera Krivokapić =

Yugoslav and Bosnian basketball player

Personal information
- Born: 6 September 1962 (age 64) Kotor, FPR Yugoslavia

Career history
- ŽKK Partizan
Medals
Women's basketball
Representing Yugoslavia
EuroBasket
Silver medal – second place	1987 Cádiz	Team competition
Universiade
Gold medal – first place	1987 Zagreb	Team competition
Bronze medal – third place	1983 Edmonton	Team competition
Bronze medal – third place	1985 Kobe	Team competition

Olivera Krivokapić (born 6 September 1962) is a former Serbian and Yugoslav professional basketball player who participated at the EuroBasket 1987 for Yugoslavia, where she won silver medal.
