= Juan Llanes =

Cuban handball player (born 1958)

Personal information
- Nationality: Cuban
- Born: 2 July 1958 (age 66)

Sport
- Sport: Handball

Juan Llanes (born 2 July 1958) is a Cuban handball player. He competed in the men's tournament at the 1980 Summer Olympics.
