= Ilona Lőrincz =

Hungarian basketball player

Personal information
- Nationality: Hungarian
- Born: 11 September 1955 (age 69); Mezőberény, Hungary

Sport
- Sport: Basketball

Ilona Lőrincz (born 11 September 1955) is a Hungarian basketball player. She competed in the women's tournament at the 1980 Summer Olympics.
