= Rodolfo Delgado (field hockey) =

Cuban hockey player

Personal information
- Nationality: Cuban
- Born: 8 May 1950 (age 75)

Sport
- Sport: Field hockey

Rodolfo Delgado (born 8 May 1950) is a Cuban field hockey player. He competed in the men's tournament at the 1980 Summer Olympics.
