= Éva Gulyás =

Hungarian basketball player

Personal information
- Full name: Éva Gulyás-Beloberk
- Nationality: Hungarian
- Born: 27 October 1955 (age 69); Budapest, Hungary

Sport
- Sport: Basketball

Éva Gulyás (born 27 October 1955) is a Hungarian basketball player. She competed in the women's tournament at the 1980 Summer Olympics.
