= Inocenta Corvea =

Cuban basketball player

Personal information
- Nationality: Cuban
- Born: 28 December 1953 (age 71)

Sport
- Sport: Basketball

Inocenta Corvea (born 28 December 1953) is a Cuban basketball player. She competed in the women's tournament at the 1980 Summer Olympics.
