= Judit Medgyesi =

Hungarian basketball player

Personal information
- Nationality: Hungarian
- Born: 23 September 1956 (age 68); Tokaj, Hungary

Sport
- Sport: Basketball

Judit Medgyesi (born 23 September 1956) is a Hungarian basketball player. She competed in the women's tournament at the 1980 Summer Olympics.
