= Vicenta Salmón =

Cuban basketball player

Personal information
- Nationality: Cuban
- Born: 22 January 1954 (age 71)

Sport
- Sport: Basketball

Vicenta Salmón (born 22 January 1954) is a Cuban basketball player. She competed in the women's tournament at the 1980 Summer Olympics.
