= Magdolna Gulyás =

Hungarian basketball player

Personal information
- Nationality: Hungarian
- Born: 7 July 1949; Karcag, Hungary
- Died: 14 June 2014 (aged 64)

Sport
- Sport: Basketball

Magdolna Gulyás (7 July 1949 – 14 June 2014) was a Hungarian basketball player. She competed in the women's tournament at the 1980 Summer Olympics.
