= María de los Santos =

Cuban basketball player

Personal information
- Nationality: Cuban
- Born: 3 March 1959 (age 66)

Sport
- Sport: Basketball

María de los Santos (born 3 March 1959) is a Cuban basketball player. She competed in the women's tournament at the 1980 Summer Olympics.
