= Sonia de la Paz =

Cuban basketball player

Personal information
- Nationality: Cuban
- Born: 1 June 1949 (age 75)

Sport
- Sport: Basketball

Sonia de la Paz (born 1 June 1949) is a Cuban basketball player. She competed in the women's tournament at the 1980 Summer Olympics.
