= Nancy Atiez =

Cuban basketball player

Personal information
- Nationality: Cuban
- Born: 11 March 1957
- Died: November 2016 (aged 59)

Sport
- Sport: Basketball

Nancy Atiez (11 March 1957 – November 2016) was a Cuban basketball player. She competed in the women's tournament at the 1980 Summer Olympics.
