= Bárbara Bécquer =

Cuban basketball player

Personal information
- Born: 31 December 1957 (age 67); Havana, Cuba

Sport
- Sport: Basketball

Bárbara Bécquer (born 31 December 1957) is a Cuban basketball player. She competed in the women's tournament at the 1980 Summer Olympics.
