= Santa Margarita Skeet =

Cuban basketball player

Personal information
- Nationality: Cuban
- Born: 1 November 1950 (age 74)

Sport
- Sport: Basketball

Santa Margarita Skeet (born 1 November 1950) is a Cuban basketball player. She competed in the women's tournament at the 1980 Summer Olympics.
