= Caridad Despaigne =

Cuban basketball player

Personal information
- Nationality: Cuban
- Born: 4 November 1959 (age 65)

Sport
- Sport: Basketball

Caridad Despaigne (born 4 November 1959) is a Cuban basketball player. She competed in the women's tournament at the 1980 Summer Olympics.
