= Matilde Charro =

Cuban basketball player

Personal information
- Born: 14 March 1953 (age 72); Havana, Cuba

Sport
- Sport: Basketball

Matilde Charro (born 14 March 1953) is a Cuban basketball player. She competed in the women's tournament at the 1980 Summer Olympics.
