= María Moret =

Cuban basketball player

Personal information
- Nationality: Cuban
- Born: 2 August 1961 (age 63)

Sport
- Sport: Basketball

María Moret (born 2 August 1961) is a Cuban basketball player. She competed in the women's tournament at the 1980 Summer Olympics.
