= EuroBasket Women 1989 squads =

== Group B ==
=== Yugoslavia ===
Yugoslavia roster
Players
Coaches

Pos.	No.	Name	Age – Date of birth	Height	Club
	4	Stojna Vangelovska	–
	5	Mara Lakić	–
	6	Željana Listes	–
	7	Slavica Slijepčević	–
	8	Kornelija Kvesić	–
	9	Danira Bilić	–
	10	Slađana Golić	–
	11	Stojanka Došić	–
	12	Biljana Majstorović	–
	13	Vesna Bajkuša	–
	14	Anđelija Arbutina	–
	15	Bojana Milošević	–

Head coach

Milan Vasojević

Legend

- (C) Team captain
- Injured
