= EuroBasket Women 1989 =

EuroBasket 1989 Women
22nd FIBA European Women's Basketball Championship

Tournament details
- Host country: Bulgaria
- Dates: 13–19 June
- Teams: 8

Final positions
- Champions: Soviet Union (20th title)

Official website
- Official website (archive)

The 1989 European Women Basketball Championship, commonly called EuroBasket Women 1989, was the 22nd regional championship held by FIBA Europe. The competition was held in Bulgaria and took place from 13 June to 19 June 1989. Soviet Union won the gold medal and Czechoslovakia the silver medal while Bulgaria won the bronze.

== Qualification ==
=== Group A ===
Pl	Team	Pld	W	L	PF	PA
1	Italy	5	?	?	?	?
2	Netherlands	5	4	1	310	266
3	Romania	5	?	?	?	?
4	Israel	5	?	?	?	?
5	Sweden	5	1	4	303	333
6	Poland	5	?	?	?	?

May 11, 1988	Netherlands	58–52	Poland
May 11, 1988	Romania	59–54	Israel
May 11, 1988	Italy	84–61	Sweden
May 12, 1988	Netherlands	63–59	Romania
May 12, 1988	Sweden	81–66	Poland
May 12, 1988	Italy	?–?	Israel
May 13, 1988	Romania	?–?	Poland
May 13, 1988	Israel	69–58	Sweden
May 13, 1988	Italy	58–49	Netherlands
May 14, 1988	Italy	?–?	Romania
May 14, 1988	Netherlands	58–44	Sweden
May 14, 1988	Israel	?–?	Poland
May 15, 1988	Italy	?–?	Poland
May 15, 1988	Netherlands	82–53	Israel
May 15, 1988	Romania	56–49	Sweden

=== Group B ===
Pl	Team	Pld	W	L	PF	PA
1	(Czech Republic) Czechoslovakia	5	5	0	377	213
2	France	5	3	2	306	269
3	Spain	5	3	2	288	301
4	West Germany	5	2	3	384	381
5	Finland	5	2	3	372	389
6	England	5	0	5	209	383

May 11, 1988	France	77–76	Spain
May 11, 1988	Finland	81–59	England
May 11, 1988	Czechoslovakia (Czech Republic)	91–71	West Germany
May 12, 1988	Spain	104–68	England
May 12, 1988	West Germany	91–79	Finland
May 12, 1988	Czechoslovakia (Czech Republic)	77–62	France
May 13, 1988	Spain	76–70	West Germany
May 13, 1988	Czechoslovakia (Czech Republic)	87–62	Finland
May 13, 1988	France	87–61	England
May 14, 1988	Czechoslovakia (Czech Republic)	76–54	Spain
May 14, 1988	Finland	72–70	France
May 14, 1988	West Germany	92–63	England
May 15, 1988	Spain	82–78	Finland
May 15, 1988	Czechoslovakia (Czech Republic)	123–26	England
May 15, 1988	France	72–60	West Germany

== First stage ==
=== Group A ===
Pl	Team	Pld	W	L	PF	PA
1	Soviet Union	3	3	0	216	179
2	(Czech Republic) Czechoslovakia	3	2	1	210	189
3	Italy	3	1	2	166	198
4	Netherlands	3	0	3	168	194

June 13, 1989	Italy	67–52	Netherlands
June 13, 1989	Soviet Union	78–75	(Czech Republic) Czechoslovakia
June 14, 1989	Czechoslovakia (Czech Republic)	68–60	Netherlands
June 14, 1989	Soviet Union	79–48	Italy
June 15, 1989	Soviet Union	59–56	Netherlands
June 15, 1989	Czechoslovakia (Czech Republic)	67–51	Italy

=== Group B ===
Pl	Team	Pld	W	L	PF	PA
1	(Socialist Federal Republic of Yugoslavia) Yugoslavia	3	3	0	236	183
2	Bulgaria	3	2	1	251	210
3	France	3	1	2	181	234
4	Hungary	3	0	3	192	233

June 13, 1989	Yugoslavia (Socialist Federal Republic of Yugoslavia)	76–52	Hungary
June 13, 1989	Bulgaria	90–54	France
June 14, 1989	Yugoslavia (Socialist Federal Republic of Yugoslavia)	81–62	France
June 14, 1989	Bulgaria	92–77	Hungary
June 15, 1989	France	65–63	Hungary
June 15, 1989	Yugoslavia (Socialist Federal Republic of Yugoslavia)	79–69	Bulgaria

== Play-off stages ==
Semifinals
June 17
Soviet Union	90
Bulgaria	71
June 17
(Socialist Federal Republic of Yugoslavia) Yugoslavia	62
(Czech Republic) Czechoslovakia	76

Final
June 18
Soviet Union	64
(Czech Republic) Czechoslovakia	61
Third place
June 18
Bulgaria	79
(Socialist Federal Republic of Yugoslavia) Yugoslavia	69

5th to 8th places
June 17	Netherlands	55–45	France
June 17	Italy	77–62	Hungary
7th place
June 18	Hungary	84–66	France
5th place
June 18	Italy	51–42	Netherlands

1989 FIBA European Women's Basketball Championship champion

Soviet Union
Twentieth title

== Final standings ==
Place	Team	PE
Gold medal	Soviet Union	Same position
Silver medal	(Czech Republic) Czechoslovakia	▲2
Bronze medal	Bulgaria	▲6
4	(Socialist Federal Republic of Yugoslavia) Yugoslavia	▼2
5	Italy	Same position
6	Netherlands	New entry
7	Hungary	▼4
8	France	Same position
