= EuroBasket Women 1983 squads =

== Group A ==
=== Yugoslavia ===
Yugoslavia roster
Players
Coaches

Pos.	No.	Name	Age – Date of birth	Height	Club
	4	Slavica Šuka	–
	5	Snežana Božinović	–
	6	Jelica Komnenović	–
	7	Olivera Čangalović	–
	8	Olivera Krivokapić	–
	9	Stojna Vangelovska	–
	10	Slađana Golić	–
	11	Bojana Milošević	–
	12	Biljana Majstorović	–
	13	Jasmina Perazić	–
	14	Cvetana Dekleva	–

Head coach

Milan Vasojević

Legend

- (C) Team captain
- Injured
