= EuroBasket Women 1983 =

EuroBasket 1983 Women
19th FIBA European Women's Basketball Championship

Tournament details
- Host country: Hungary
- Dates: 11–18 September
- Teams: 12
- Venue: (in Budapest, Miskolc, Zalaegerszeg host cities)

Final positions
- Champions: Soviet Union (17th title)

Official website
- Official website (archive)

The 1983 European Women Basketball Championship, commonly called EuroBasket Women 1983, was the 19th regional championship held by FIBA Europe. The competition was held in Hungary and took place from 11 September to 18 September 1983. Soviet Union won the gold medal and Bulgaria the silver medal while Hungary won the bronze.

== First stage ==
=== Group A ===
| Pl | Team | Pld | W | L | PF | PA |
|---|---|---|---|---|---|---|
| 1 | (Socialist Federal Republic of Yugoslavia) Yugoslavia | 5 | 5 | 0 | 329 | 283 |
| 2 | Hungary | 5 | 4 | 1 | 390 | 337 |
| 3 | Poland | 5 | 3 | 2 | 384 | 353 |
| 4 | Netherlands | 5 | 2 | 3 | 273 | 300 |
| 5 | Romania | 5 | 1 | 4 | 367 | 369 |
| 6 | Spain | 5 | 0 | 5 | 296 | 397 |

| September 11 | Poland | 92–59 | Spain |
| September 11 | Yugoslavia (Socialist Federal Republic of Yugoslavia) | 60–50 | Netherlands |
| September 11 | Hungary | 87–85 | Romania |
| September 12 | Poland | 62–60 | Netherlands |
| September 12 | Yugoslavia (Socialist Federal Republic of Yugoslavia) | 66–59 | Romania |
| September 12 | Hungary | 94–64 | Spain |
| September 13 | Romania | 83–64 | Spain |
| September 13 | Yugoslavia (Socialist Federal Republic of Yugoslavia) | 68–60 | Poland |
| September 13 | Hungary | 72–55 | Netherlands |
| September 14 | Netherlands | 55–54 | Romania |
| September 14 | Yugoslavia (Socialist Federal Republic of Yugoslavia) | 75–57 | Spain |
| September 14 | Hungary | 80–73 | Poland |
| September 15 | Netherlands | 53–52 | Spain |
| September 15 | Poland | 97–86 | Romania |
| September 15 | Yugoslavia (Socialist Federal Republic of Yugoslavia) | 60–57 | Hungary |

=== Group B ===
| Pl | Team | Pld | W | L | PF | PA |
|---|---|---|---|---|---|---|
| 1 | Soviet Union | 5 | 5 | 0 | 508 | 298 |
| 2 | Bulgaria | 5 | 4 | 1 | 420 | 418 |
| 3 | Italy | 5 | 2 | 3 | 323 | 348 |
| 4 | (Czech Republic) Czechoslovakia | 5 | 2 | 3 | 365 | 398 |
| 5 | Sweden | 5 | 1 | 4 | 364 | 418 |
| 6 | West Germany | 5 | 1 | 4 | 299 | 399 |

| September 11 | Soviet Union | 105–74 | Sweden |
| September 11 | West Germany | 54–50 | Italy |
| September 11 | Bulgaria | 90–86 | (Czech Republic) Czechoslovakia |
| September 12 | Sweden | 68–66 | West Germany |
| September 12 | Soviet Union | 108–60 | Bulgaria |
| September 12 | Italy | 74–68 | (Czech Republic) Czechoslovakia |
| September 13 | Bulgaria | 88–62 | West Germany |
| September 13 | Italy | 72–58 | Sweden |
| September 13 | Soviet Union | 97–55 | (Czech Republic) Czechoslovakia |
| September 14 | Czechoslovakia (Czech Republic) | 78–76 | Sweden |
| September 14 | Soviet Union | 115–56 | West Germany |
| September 14 | Bulgaria | 85–74 | Italy |
| September 15 | Soviet Union | 83–53 | Italy |
| September 15 | Bulgaria | 97–88 | Sweden |
| September 15 | Czechoslovakia (Czech Republic) | 78–61 | West Germany |

== Play-off stages ==
Semifinals
September 17
(Socialist Federal Republic of Yugoslavia) Yugoslavia | 62
Bulgaria | 72
September 17
Soviet Union | 103
Hungary | 69

Final
September 18
Bulgaria | 70
Soviet Union | 91
Third place
September 18
(Socialist Federal Republic of Yugoslavia) Yugoslavia | 79
Hungary | 82

9th to 12th places
| September 17 | Romania | 71–62 | West Germany |
| September 17 | Sweden | 85–82 | Spain |
5th to 8th places
| September 17 | Czechoslovakia (Czech Republic) | 69–59 | Poland |
| September 17 | Italy | 60–57 | Netherlands |
11th place
| September 18 | Spain | 64–63 | West Germany |
9th place
| September 18 | Romania | 80–75 | Sweden |
7th place
| September 18 | Poland | 82–73 | Netherlands |
5th place
| September 18 | Italy | 55–54 | (Czech Republic) Czechoslovakia |

1983 FIBA European Women's Basketball Championship champion

Soviet Union
Seventeenth title

== Final standings ==
| Place | Team | PE |
|---|---|---|
| Gold medal | Soviet Union | Same position |
| Silver medal | Bulgaria | ▲3 |
| Bronze medal | Hungary | ▲6 |
| 4 | (Socialist Federal Republic of Yugoslavia) Yugoslavia | Same position |
| 5 | Italy | ▲2 |
| 6 | (Czech Republic) Czechoslovakia | ▼3 |
| 7 | Poland | ▼5 |
| 8 | Netherlands | ▼2 |
| 9 | Romania | ▼1 |
| 10 | Sweden | ▲1 |
| 11 | Spain | New entry |
| 12 | West Germany | ▼2 |
