= EuroBasket Women 1985 =

EuroBasket 1985 Women
20th FIBA European Women's Basketball Championship

Tournament details
- Host country: Italy
- Dates: 8–15 September
- Teams: 12

Final positions
- Champions: Soviet Union (18th title)

Official website
- Official website (archive)

The 1985 European Women Basketball Championship, commonly called EuroBasket Women 1985, was the 20th regional championship held by FIBA Europe. The competition was held in Italy and took place from 8 September to 15 September 1985. Soviet Union won the gold medal and Bulgaria the silver medal while Hungary won the bronze.

== First stage ==
=== Group A ===
Pl	Team	Pld	W	L	PF	PA
1	Bulgaria	5	3	2	369	332
2	(Czech Republic) Czechoslovakia	5	3	2	359	380
3	France	5	3	2	208	296
4	(Socialist Federal Republic of Yugoslavia) Yugoslavia	5	3	2	373	329
5	Romania	5	2	3	332	357
6	Netherlands	5	1	4	284	331

September 8	Yugoslavia (Socialist Federal Republic of Yugoslavia)	92–57	Romania
September 8	Bulgaria	78–58	Netherlands
September 8	Czechoslovakia (Czech Republic)	71–65	France
September 9	Romania	79–52	(Czech Republic) Czechoslovakia
September 9	France	57–39	Netherlands
September 9	Yugoslavia (Socialist Federal Republic of Yugoslavia)	67–66	Bulgaria
September 10	France	70–62	Romania
September 10	Yugoslavia (Socialist Federal Republic of Yugoslavia)	71–52	Netherlands
September 10	Bulgaria	93–89	(Czech Republic) Czechoslovakia
September 11	Netherlands	71–60	Romania
September 11	Bulgaria	60–44	France
September 11	Czechoslovakia (Czech Republic)	82–79	(Socialist Federal Republic of Yugoslavia) Yugoslavia
September 12	Romania	74–72	Bulgaria
September 12	Czechoslovakia (Czech Republic)	65–64	Netherlands
September 12	France	72–64	(Socialist Federal Republic of Yugoslavia) Yugoslavia

=== Group B ===
Pl	Team	Pld	W	L	PF	PA
1	Soviet Union	5	5	0	449	261
2	Hungary	5	4	1	363	297
3	Italy	5	2	3	344	293
4	Poland	5	2	3	328	328
5	Spain	5	2	3	307	386
6	Belgium	5	0	5	210	436

September 8	Hungary	78–65	Spain
September 8	Poland	84–36	Belgium
September 8	Soviet Union	75–57	Italy
September 9	Hungary	76–54	Poland
September 9	Soviet Union	95–46	Belgium
September 9	Italy	77–46	Spain
September 10	Soviet Union	87–65	Hungary
September 10	Italy	90–37	Belgium
September 10	Spain	70–65	Poland
September 11	Spain	84–51	Belgium
September 11	Soviet Union	77–51	Poland
September 11	Hungary	61–51	Italy
September 12	Soviet Union	115–42	Spain
September 12	Hungary	83–40	Belgium
September 12	Poland	74–69	Italy

== Play-off stages ==
Semifinals
September 14
Bulgaria	73
Hungary	67
September 14
Soviet Union	111
(Czech Republic) Czechoslovakia	43

Final
September 15
Bulgaria	69
Soviet Union	103
Third place
September 15
Hungary	103
(Czech Republic) Czechoslovakia	76

9th to 12th places
September 14	Romania	70–55	Belgium
September 14	Spain	56–44	Netherlands
5th to 8th places
September 14	Poland	59–57	France
September 14	Yugoslavia (Socialist Federal Republic of Yugoslavia)	83–71	Italy
11th place
September 15	Netherlands	70–41	Belgium
9th place
September 15	Romania	93–73	Spain
7th place
September 15	Italy	63–55	France
5th place
September 15	Yugoslavia (Socialist Federal Republic of Yugoslavia)	76–58	Poland

1985 FIBA European Women's Basketball Championship champion

Soviet Union
Eighteenth title

== Final standings ==
Place	Team	PE
Gold medal	Soviet Union	Same position
Silver medal	Bulgaria	Same position
Bronze medal	Hungary	Same position
4	(Czech Republic) Czechoslovakia	▲2
5	(Socialist Federal Republic of Yugoslavia) Yugoslavia	▼1
6	Poland	▲1
7	Italy	▼2
8	France	New entry
9	Romania	Same position
10	Spain	▲1
11	Netherlands	▼3
12	Belgium	New entry
