= Basketball at the 1988 Summer Olympics – Men's team rosters =

Twelve men's teams competed in basketball at the 1988 Summer Olympics.

== Group A ==
=== Australia ===
The following is the Australia roster in the men's basketball tournament of the 1988 Summer Olympics.

Australia men's national basketball team – 1988 Summer Olympics roster
Players
Coaches

| Pos. | No. | Name | Age – Date of birth | Height | Club | Ctr. |
|---|---|---|---|---|---|---|
| SG | 4 | Darryl Pearce | 27 – 15 October 1960 | 1.91 m (6 ft 3 in) |
| PF | 5 | Robert Sibley | 22 – 10 July 1966 | 1.99 m (6 ft 6 in) |
| PG | 6 | Phil Smyth | 30 – 11 May 1958 | 1.83 m (6 ft 0 in) |
| PF | 7 | Larry Sengstock | 28 – 4 March 1960 | 1.98 m (6 ft 6 in) |
| G/F | 8 | Damian Keogh | 26 – 1 February 1962 | 1.94 m (6 ft 4 in) |
| | 9 | Wayne Carroll | 29 – 16 February 1959 |
| C | 10 | Luc Longley | 19 – 19 January 1969 | 2.20 m (7 ft 3 in) |
| G | 11 | Andrew Gaze | 23 – 24 July 1965 | 2.01 m (6 ft 7 in) |
| C | 12 | Mark Bradtke | 19 – 27 September 1968 | 2.09 m (6 ft 10 in) |
| F/C | 13 | Brad Dalton | 29 – 12 September 1959 | 2.03 m (6 ft 8 in) |
| F | 14 | Andrew Vlahov | 19 – 1 April 1969 | 2.00 m (6 ft 7 in) |
| F/C | 15 | Ray Borner | 26 – 27 May 1962 | 2.08 m (6 ft 10 in) |

Head coach

Adrian Hurley

Legend

- Club – describes last
  club before the tournament
- Age – describes age
  on 17 September 1988

=== Central African Republic ===
The following is the Central African Republic roster in the men's basketball tournament of the 1988 Summer Olympics.

Central African Republic men's national basketball team – 1988 Summer Olympics roster
Players
Coaches

| Pos. | No. | Name | Age – Date of birth | Height | Club | Ctr. |
|---|---|---|---|---|---|---|
| | 4 | Sanda Bouba Oumarou | 30 – 1 January 1958 | 1.87 m (6 ft 2 in) |
| | 5 | Aubin-Thierry Goporo | 20 – 15 May 1968 | 1.85 m (6 ft 1 in) |
| | 6 | Joseph-Dieudonné Ouagon | 25 – 10 November 1962 | 1.87 m (6 ft 2 in) |
| F | 7 | Bruno-Nazaire Kongaouin | 21 – 12 October 1966 | 2.03 m (6 ft 8 in) |
| | 8 | Eugène Pehoua-Pelema | 25 – 8 April 1963 | 1.92 m (6 ft 4 in) |
| | 9 | Guy M'Bongo | 19 – 23 September 1968 | 1.96 m (6 ft 5 in) |
| | 10 | Frédéricque Rufin Goporo | 22 – 8 August 1966 | 1.75 m (5 ft 9 in) |
| | 11 | Jean-Pierre Kotta | 32 – 3 May 1956 | 1.87 m (6 ft 2 in) |
| | 12 | Christian Gombe | 26 – 22 February 1962 | 1.90 m (6 ft 3 in) |
| C | 13 | Anicet Lavodrama | 25 – 4 July 1963 | 2.02 m (6 ft 8 in) |
| | 14 | Richard Bella | 21 – 3 April 1967 | 2.05 m (6 ft 9 in) |
| | 15 | François Naoueyama | 31 – 31 January 1957 | 2.02 m (6 ft 8 in) |

Legend

- Club – describes last
  club before the tournament
- Age – describes age
  on 17 September 1988

=== Puerto Rico ===
The following is the Puerto Rico roster in the men's basketball tournament of the 1988 Summer Olympics.

Puerto Rico men's national basketball team – 1988 Summer Olympics roster
Players
Coaches

| Pos. | No. | Name | Age – Date of birth | Height | Club | Ctr. |
|---|---|---|---|---|---|---|
| C | 4 | José Ortiz | 24 – 25 October 1963 | 2.11 m (6 ft 11 in) | | (Greece) |
| PG | 5 | Federico López | 26 – 26 March 1962 | 1.85 m (6 ft 1 in) |
| SG | 6 | Raymond Gause | 28 – 4 February 1960 | 1.93 m (6 ft 4 in) |
| | 7 | Vicente Ithier | 26 – 22 April 1962 | 1.91 m (6 ft 3 in) |
| F | 8 | Jerome Mincy | 23 – 10 October 1964 | 2.00 m (6 ft 7 in) |
| | 9 | Roberto Ríos | 31 – 14 August 1957 | 1.83 m (6 ft 0 in) |
| PG | 10 | Angelo Cruz | 29 – 20 September 1958 | 1.75 m (5 ft 9 in) |
| F/C | 11 | Ramón Rivas | 22 – 16 March 1966 | 2.08 m (6 ft 10 in) | | (Greece) |
| F | 12 | Mario Morales | 30 – 15 November 1957 | 1.96 m (6 ft 5 in) |
| | 13 | Edgar de León | 23 – 2 November 1964 | 2.03 m (6 ft 8 in) |
| | 14 | Francisco de León | 27 – 25 July 1961 | 2.08 m (6 ft 10 in) |
| F/C | 15 | Ramón Ramos | 20 – 2 November 1967 | 2.03 m (6 ft 8 in) |

Head coach

Aramandito Torres

Legend

- Club – describes last
  club before the tournament
- Age – describes age
  on 17 September 1988

=== South Korea ===
The following is the South Korea roster in the men's basketball tournament of the 1988 Summer Olympics.

South Korea men's national basketball team – 1988 Summer Olympics roster
Players
Coaches

| Pos. | No. | Name | Age – Date of birth | Height | Club | Ctr. |
|---|---|---|---|---|---|---|
| SG | 4 | Lee Won-woo | 30 – 19 August 1958 | 1.88 m (6 ft 2 in) |
| | 5 | Choi Chul-kwon | 25 – 19 July 1963 | 1.79 m (5 ft 10 in) |
| SG | 6 | Lee Chung-hee | 28 – 7 November 1959 | 1.82 m (6 ft 0 in) |
| | 7 | Oh Seh-wong | 27 – 20 June 1961 | 1.88 m (6 ft 2 in) |
| | 8 | Yoo Jae-hak | 25 – 20 March 1963 | 1.80 m (5 ft 11 in) |
| | 9 | Lee Moon-kyu | 32 – 4 August 1956 | 1.90 m (6 ft 3 in) |
| | 10 | Kim Hyun-jun | 28 – 3 June 1960 | 1.82 m (6 ft 0 in) |
| | 11 | Hur Jae | 22 – 28 September 1965 | 1.88 m (6 ft 2 in) |
| | 12 | Kim Yoon-ho | 25 – 21 March 1963 | 1.92 m (6 ft 4 in) |
| | 13 | Park Jong-chun | 28 – 13 May 1960 | 1.94 m (6 ft 4 in) |
| C | 14 | Kim Yoo-taek | 24 – 10 October 1963 | 1.97 m (6 ft 6 in) |
| | 15 | Han Ki-bum | 24 – 7 June 1964 | 2.07 m (6 ft 9 in) |

Legend

- Club – describes last
  club before the tournament
- Age – describes age
  on 17 September 1988

=== Soviet Union ===
The following is the Soviet Union roster in the men's basketball tournament of the 1988 Summer Olympics.

Soviet Union men's national basketball team – 1988 Summer Olympics roster
Players
Coaches

| Pos. | No. | Name | Age – Date of birth | Height | Club | Ctr. |
|---|---|---|---|---|---|---|
| F/C | 4 | Alexander Volkov | 24 – 29 March 1964 | 2.08 m (6 ft 10 in) | PBC CSKA Moscow | (Soviet Union) |
| PG | 5 | Tiit Sokk | 23 – 15 November 1964 | 1.91 m (6 ft 3 in) | KK Kalev | (Soviet Union) |
| F | 6 | Sergei Tarakanov | 30 – 25 April 1958 | 2.03 m (6 ft 8 in) | PBC CSKA Moscow | (Soviet Union) |
| SG | 7 | Šarūnas Marčiulionis | 24 – 13 June 1964 | 1.96 m (6 ft 5 in) | BC Statyba | (Soviet Union) |
| G | 8 | Igors Miglinieks | 24 – 4 May 1964 | 1.94 m (6 ft 4 in) | PBC CSKA Moscow | (Soviet Union) |
| F | 9 | Valeri Tikhonenko | 24 – 19 August 1964 | 2.06 m (6 ft 9 in) | BC SKA Alma-Ata | (Soviet Union) |
| SG | 10 | Rimas Kurtinaitis | 28 – 15 May 1960 | 1.96 m (6 ft 5 in) | BC Žalgiris | (Soviet Union) |
| C | 11 | Arvydas Sabonis | 23 – 19 December 1964 | 2.20 m (7 ft 3 in) | BC Žalgiris | (Soviet Union) |
| C | 12 | Viktor Pankrashkin | 30 – 10 December 1957 | 2.20 m (7 ft 3 in) | PBC CSKA Moscow | (Soviet Union) |
| PG | 13 | Valdemaras Chomičius | 29 – 4 May 1959 | 1.92 m (6 ft 4 in) | BC Žalgiris | (Soviet Union) |
| C | 14 | Alexander Belostenny | 29 – 24 February 1959 | 2.14 m (7 ft 0 in) | BC Budivelnyk | (Soviet Union) |
| C | 15 | Valery Goborov | 22 – 20 January 1966 | 2.11 m (6 ft 11 in) | PBC CSKA Moscow | (Soviet Union) |

Head coach

Alexander Gomelsky

Legend

- Club – describes last
  club before the tournament
- Age – describes age
  on 17 September 1988

=== Yugoslavia ===
The following is the Yugoslavia roster in the men's basketball tournament of the 1988 Summer Olympics.

Yugoslavia men's national basketball team – 1988 Summer Olympics roster
Players
Coaches

| Pos. | No. | Name | Age – Date of birth | Height | Club | Ctr. |
|---|---|---|---|---|---|---|
| SG | 4 | Dražen Petrović | 23 – 22 October 1964 | 1.96 m (6 ft 5 in) | KK Cibona | (Socialist Federal Republic of Yugoslavia) |
| SG | 5 | Zdravko Radulović | 21 – 12 December 1966 | 1.91 m (6 ft 3 in) | KK Bosna Royal | (Socialist Federal Republic of Yugoslavia) |
| F | 6 | Zoran Čutura | 26 – 12 March 1962 | 2.02 m (6 ft 8 in) | KK Cibona | (Socialist Federal Republic of Yugoslavia) |
| F | 7 | Toni Kukoč | 19 – 18 September 1968 | 2.08 m (6 ft 10 in) | KK Split | (Socialist Federal Republic of Yugoslavia) |
| F | 8 | Žarko Paspalj | 22 – 27 March 1966 | 2.07 m (6 ft 9 in) | KK Partizan | (Socialist Federal Republic of Yugoslavia) |
| PG | 9 | Željko Obradović | 28 – 9 March 1960 | 1.80 m (5 ft 11 in) | KK Partizan | (Socialist Federal Republic of Yugoslavia) |
| G | 10 | Jure Zdovc | 21 – 13 December 1966 | 1.98 m (6 ft 6 in) | KK Olimpija | (Socialist Federal Republic of Yugoslavia) |
| C | 11 | Stojko Vranković | 24 – 22 January 1964 | 2.18 m (7 ft 2 in) | KK Zadar | (Socialist Federal Republic of Yugoslavia) |
| C | 12 | Vlade Divac | 20 – 3 February 1968 | 2.16 m (7 ft 1 in) | KK Partizan | (Socialist Federal Republic of Yugoslavia) |
| C | 13 | Dino Rađa | 21 – 24 April 1967 | 2.11 m (6 ft 11 in) | KK Split | (Socialist Federal Republic of Yugoslavia) |
| C | 14 | Franjo Arapović | 23 – 2 June 1965 | 2.15 m (7 ft 1 in) | KK Cibona | (Socialist Federal Republic of Yugoslavia) |
| SG | 15 | Danko Cvjetićanin | 24 – 16 October 1963 | 1.98 m (6 ft 6 in) | KK Cibona | (Socialist Federal Republic of Yugoslavia) |

Head coach

Dušan Ivković

Legend

- Club – describes last
  club before the tournament
- Age – describes age
  on 17 September 1988

== Group B ==
=== Brazil ===
The following is the Brazil roster in the men's basketball tournament of the 1988 Summer Olympics.

Brazil men's national basketball team – 1988 Summer Olympics roster
Players
Coaches

| Pos. | No. | Name | Age – Date of birth | Height | Club | Ctr. |
|---|---|---|---|---|---|---|
| C | 4 | Paulinho | 25 – 26 January 1963 | 2.17 m (7 ft 1 in) |
| PG | 5 | Guerrinha | 29 – 21 June 1959 | 1.86 m (6 ft 1 in) |
| PF | 6 | Gerson Victalino | 29 – 17 September 1959 | 2.05 m (6 ft 9 in) |
| SF | 7 | João Vianna | 24 – 15 November 1963 | 2.06 m (6 ft 9 in) |
| C | 8 | Rolando Ferreira | 24 – 24 May 1964 | 2.16 m (7 ft 1 in) |
| SG | 9 | Cadum | 18 – 4 October 1969 | 2.00 m (6 ft 7 in) |
| PG | 10 | Maury de Souza | 26 – 2 September 1962 | 1.90 m (6 ft 3 in) |
| SG | 11 | Marcel de Souza | 31 – 4 December 1956 | 1.99 m (6 ft 6 in) |
| SF | 12 | Luiz de Azevedo | 23 – 8 October 1964 | 1.95 m (6 ft 5 in) |
| C | 13 | Paulão | 25 – 21 July 1963 | 2.17 m (7 ft 1 in) |
| PF | 14 | Oscar Schmidt | 30 – 16 February 1958 | 2.05 m (6 ft 9 in) | JuveCaserta Basket | (Italy) |
| C | 15 | Israel Andrade | 28 – 17 January 1960 | 2.06 m (6 ft 9 in) |

Legend

- Club – describes last
  club before the tournament
- Age – describes age
  on 17 September 1988

=== Canada ===
The following is the Canada roster in the men's basketball tournament of the 1988 Summer Olympics.

Canada men's national basketball team – 1988 Summer Olympics roster
Players
Coaches

| Pos. | No. | Name | Age – Date of birth | Height | Club | Ctr. |
|---|---|---|---|---|---|---|
| | 4 | Norman Clarke | 28 – 27 June 1960 | 1.87 m (6 ft 2 in) |
| SG | 5 | David Turcotte | 23 – 10 July 1965 | 1.87 m (6 ft 2 in) | Colorado State Rams | (United States) |
| PG | 6 | Eli Pasquale | 28 – 24 August 1960 | 1.85 m (6 ft 1 in) |
| SG | 7 | Karl Tilleman | 27 – 1 November 1960 | 1.88 m (6 ft 2 in) |
| | 8 | Alan Kristmanson | 26 – 5 November 1961 | 2.00 m (6 ft 7 in) |
| G | 9 | Jay Triano | 29 – 21 September 1958 | 1.93 m (6 ft 4 in) |
| | 10 | Dwight Walton | 23 – 23 March 1965 |
| | 11 | John Hatch | 26 – 23 February 1962 | 1.98 m (6 ft 6 in) |
| | 12 | Barry Mungar | 26 – 4 November 1961 | 2.03 m (6 ft 8 in) |
| F/C | 13 | Romel Raffin | 34 – 23 April 1954 | 2.06 m (6 ft 9 in) |
| | 14 | Wayne Yearwood | 23 – 22 September 1964 |
| F/C | 15 | Gerald Kazanowski | 27 – 12 October 1960 | 2.06 m (6 ft 9 in) |

Head coach

Jack Donohue

Legend

- Club – describes last
  club before the tournament
- Age – describes age
  on 17 September 1988

=== China ===
The following is the China roster in the men's basketball tournament of the 1988 Summer Olympics.

China men's national basketball team – 1988 Summer Olympics roster
Players
Coaches

| Pos. | No. | Name | Age – Date of birth | Height | Club | Ctr. |
|---|---|---|---|---|---|---|
| | 4 | Gong Luming | 31 – 29 August 1957 | 1.74 m (5 ft 9 in) |
| | 5 | Wang Fei | 25 – 25 March 1963 | 1.92 m (6 ft 4 in) |
| | 6 | Huang Yunlong | 28 – 10 July 1960 | 2.00 m (6 ft 7 in) |
| | 7 | Sha Guoli | 28 – 30 August 1960 | 1.94 m (6 ft 4 in) |
| | 8 | Zhang Xuelei | 25 – 15 May 1963 | 2.01 m (6 ft 7 in) |
| | 9 | Song Ligang | 21 – 8 June 1967 | 2.00 m (6 ft 7 in) |
| | 10 | Li Yaguang | 30 – 8 June 1958 | 1.88 m (6 ft 2 in) |
| | 11 | Sun Fengwu | 26 – 19 March 1962 | 1.90 m (6 ft 3 in) |
| C | 12 | Wang Libin | 25 – 31 March 1963 | 2.01 m (6 ft 7 in) |
| | 13 | Zhang Yongjun | 25 – 4 January 1963 | 1.86 m (6 ft 1 in) |
| | 14 | Xu Xiaoliang | 26 – 30 January 1962 | 2.10 m (6 ft 11 in) |
| | 15 | Zhang Bin | 26 – 28 December 1961 | 1.98 m (6 ft 6 in) |

Head coach

Qian Chenghai

Legend

- Club – describes last
  club before the tournament
- Age – describes age
  on 17 September 1988

=== Egypt ===
The following is the Egypt roster in the men's basketball tournament of the 1988 Summer Olympics.

Egypt men's national basketball team – 1988 Summer Olympics roster
Players
Coaches

| Pos. | No. | Name | Age – Date of birth | Height | Club | Ctr. |
|---|---|---|---|---|---|---|
| | 4 | Alaa El-Din Abdoun | 23 – 19 February 1965 | 1.88 m (6 ft 2 in) |
| | 5 | Hany Moussa | 22 – 19 June 1966 | 1.95 m (6 ft 5 in) |
| | 6 | Ashraf Sedky | 32 – 10 March 1956 | 1.96 m (6 ft 5 in) |
| F | 7 | Mohamed Ismail | 29 – 28 October 1958 | 2.02 m (6 ft 8 in) |
| | 8 | Alain Attalah | 23 – 5 October 1964 | 1.88 m (6 ft 2 in) |
| | 9 | Abdel Meguid Amir | 27 – 18 June 1961 |
| | 10 | Ashraf El-Kordy | 21 – 15 January 1967 | 1.96 m (6 ft 5 in) |
| | 11 | Emad El-Din Mahmoud Ali | 22 – 21 March 1966 | 2.02 m (6 ft 8 in) |
| | 12 | Hisham Khalil | 24 – 8 November 1963 | 2.03 m (6 ft 8 in) |
| | 13 | Mohamed El-Shakeri | 19 – 7 November 1968 | 1.98 m (6 ft 6 in) |
| | 14 | El-Sayed Mohamed | 23 – 3 September 1965 | 1.90 m (6 ft 3 in) |
| | 15 | Ahmed Soliman | 22 – 11 December 1965 | 1.82 m (6 ft 0 in) |

Legend

- Club – describes last
  club before the tournament
- Age – describes age
  on 17 September 1988

=== Spain ===
The following is the Spain roster in the men's basketball tournament of the 1988 Summer Olympics.

Spain men's national basketball team – 1988 Summer Olympics roster
Players
Coaches

| Pos. | No. | Name | Age – Date of birth | Height | Club | Ctr. |
|---|---|---|---|---|---|---|
| G/F | 4 | Jordi Villacampa | 24 – 11 October 1963 | 1.96 m (6 ft 5 in) | Club Joventut Badalona | (Spain) |
| | 5 | José Luis Llorente | 29 – 6 January 1959 | 1.82 m (6 ft 0 in) | Real Madrid Baloncesto | (Spain) |
| SF | 6 | José Biriukov | 25 – 3 February 1963 | 1.93 m (6 ft 4 in) | Real Madrid Baloncesto | (Spain) |
| SF | 7 | Josep Maria Margall | 33 – 17 March 1955 | 1.98 m (6 ft 6 in) | Club Joventut Badalona | (Spain) |
| PF | 8 | Andrés Jiménez | 26 – 6 June 1962 | 2.05 m (6 ft 9 in) | FC Barcelona Bàsquet | (Spain) |
| C | 9 | Enrique Andreu | 20 – 20 October 1967 | 2.10 m (6 ft 11 in) | CEB Llíria | (Spain) |
| PG | 10 | José Antonio Montero | 23 – 3 January 1965 | 1.93 m (6 ft 4 in) | Club Joventut Badalona | (Spain) |
| F | 11 | Fernando Arcega | 28 – 3 September 1960 | 2.03 m (6 ft 8 in) | CB Zaragoza | (Spain) |
| PG | 12 | Ignacio Solozábal | 30 – 8 January 1958 | 1.85 m (6 ft 1 in) | FC Barcelona Bàsquet | (Spain) |
| F/C | 13 | Ferran Martínez | 20 – 25 April 1968 | 2.13 m (7 ft 0 in) | RCD Espanyol Bàsquet | (Spain) |
| C | 14 | Antonio Martín Espina | 22 – 18 June 1966 | 2.10 m (6 ft 11 in) | Real Madrid Baloncesto | (Spain) |
| SF | 15 | Juan Antonio San Epifanio | 29 – 12 June 1959 | 2.01 m (6 ft 7 in) | FC Barcelona Bàsquet | (Spain) |

Head coach

Antonio Díaz-Miguel

Legend

- Club – describes last
  club before the tournament
- Age – describes age
  on 17 September 1988

=== United States ===
The following is the United States roster in the men's basketball tournament of the 1988 Summer Olympics.

United States men's national basketball team – 1988 Summer Olympics roster
Players
Coaches

| Pos. | No. | Name | Age – Date of birth | Height | Club | Ctr. |
|---|---|---|---|---|---|---|
| G | 4 | Mitch Richmond | 23 – 30 June 1965 | 1.96 m (6 ft 5 in) | Kansas State Wildcats | (United States) |
| G | 5 | Charles Smith | 20 – 29 November 1967 | 1.85 m (6 ft 1 in) | Georgetown Hoyas | (United States) |
| G | 6 | Bimbo Coles | 20 – 22 April 1968 | 1.85 m (6 ft 1 in) | Virginia Tech Hokies | (United States) |
| G | 7 | Hersey Hawkins | 21 – 29 September 1966 | 1.90 m (6 ft 3 in) | Bradley Braves | (United States) |
| G/F | 8 | Jeff Grayer | 22 – 17 December 1965 | 1.96 m (6 ft 5 in) | Iowa State Cyclones | (United States) |
| F | 9 | Charles Smith | 23 – 16 July 1965 | 2.08 m (6 ft 10 in) | Pittsburgh Panthers | (United States) |
| F | 10 | Willie Anderson | 22 – 8 January 1966 | 2.01 m (6 ft 7 in) | Georgia Bulldogs | (United States) |
| G/F | 11 | Stacey Augmon | 20 – 1 August 1968 | 2.03 m (6 ft 8 in) | UNLV Runnin' Rebels | (United States) |
| G/F | 12 | Dan Majerle | 23 – 9 September 1965 | 1.98 m (6 ft 6 in) | Central Michigan Chippewas | (United States) |
| F | 13 | Danny Manning | 22 – 17 May 1966 | 2.08 m (6 ft 10 in) | Kansas Jayhawks | (United States) |
| C | 14 | J. R. Reid | 20 – 31 March 1968 | 2.06 m (6 ft 9 in) | North Carolina Tar Heels | (United States) |
| C | 15 | David Robinson | 23 – 6 August 1965 | 2.16 m (7 ft 1 in) | Navy Midshipmen | (United States) |

Head coach

John Thompson

Legend

- Club – describes last
  club before the tournament
- Age – describes age
  on 17 September 1988
