= Egypt at the 1988 Summer Olympics =

- IOC code: EGY
- NOC: Egyptian Olympic Committee

in Seoul, South Korea 17 September–2 October 1988
- Competitors: 51 in 12 sports
- Flag bearer: Mohamed Khorshed
- Medals: Gold 0 Silver 0 Bronze 0 Total 0

Summer Olympics appearances (overview)
- 1912; 1920; 1924; 1928; 1932; 1936; 1948; 1952; 1956; 1960–1964; 1968; 1972; 1976; 1980; 1984; 1988; 1992; 1996; 2000; 2004; 2008; 2012; 2016; 2020; 2024; 2028

Other related appearances
- 1906 Intercalated Games –––– United Arab Republic (1960, 1964)

Egypt competed at the 1988 Summer Olympics in Seoul, South Korea. 49 competitors, 48 men and 1 woman, took part in 36 events in 12 sports. The nation did not win any medals at this edition of the Games.

== Competitors ==
The following lists the number of Egyptian competitors in various sports at the 1988 Games.

| Sport | Men | Women | Total |
|---|---|---|---|
| Athletics | 4 | 0 | 4 |
| Basketball | 12 | 0 | 12 |
| Boxing | 4 | – | 4 |
| Equestrian | 1 | 0 | 1 |
| Fencing | 2 | 0 | 2 |
| Judo | 3 | 0 | 3 |
| Modern pentathlon | 3 | – | 3 |
| Shooting | 2 | 0 | 2 |
| Swimming | 5 | 0 | 5 |
| Table tennis | 2 | 1 | 3 |
| Weightlifting | 5 | – | 5 |
| Wrestling | 7 | – | 7 |
| Total | 50 | 1 | 51 |

== Athletics ==
Men
Track and road events

| Athlete | Event | Heat Round 1 | | Heat Round 2 | | Semifinal | | Final | |
| Athlete | Event | Time | Rank | Time | Rank | Time | Rank | Time | Rank |
|---|---|---|---|---|---|---|---|---|---|
| Ahmed Ghanem | 400 metres hurdles | 50.44 | 18 | —N/a | | Did not advance | | | |

Field events

| Athlete | Event | Qualification | | Final | |
| Athlete | Event | Distance | Position | Distance | Position |
|---|---|---|---|---|---|
| Ahmed Mohamed Ashoush | Shot put | 18.94 | 15 | Did not advance | |
| Ahmed Kamel Shatta | Shot put | 17.61 | 18 | Did not advance | |
| Mohamed Naguib Hamed | Discus throw | NM | | Did not advance | |

== Basketball ==
=== Men's tournament ===
Summary

| Team | Event | Group stage | | | | | | Quarterfinal | Semifinal | Final / BM | |
| Team | Event | Opposition Score | Opposition Score | Opposition Score | Opposition Score | Opposition Score | Rank | Opposition Score | Opposition Score | Opposition Score | Rank |
|---|---|---|---|---|---|---|---|---|---|---|---|
| Egypt men's | Men's tournament | China; L 84–98 | Spain; L 70–113 | Canada; L 64–117 | Brazil; L 85–138 | United States; L 35–102 | 6 | —N/a | Central African Republic; L 57–63 | China; L 75–97 | 12 |

Team roster

The following is the Egypt roster in the men's basketball tournament of the 1988 Summer Olympics.

Egypt men's national basketball team – 1988 Summer Olympics roster
Players
Coaches

| Pos. | No. | Name | Age – Date of birth | Height | Club | Ctr. |
|---|---|---|---|---|---|---|
| | 4 | Alaa El-Din Abdoun | 23 – 19 February 1965 | 1.88 m (6 ft 2 in) |
| | 5 | Hany Moussa | 22 – 19 June 1966 | 1.95 m (6 ft 5 in) |
| | 6 | Ashraf Sedky | 32 – 10 March 1956 | 1.96 m (6 ft 5 in) |
| F | 7 | Mohamed Ismail | 29 – 28 October 1958 | 2.02 m (6 ft 8 in) |
| | 8 | Alain Attalah | 23 – 5 October 1964 | 1.88 m (6 ft 2 in) |
| | 9 | Abdel Meguid Amir | 27 – 18 June 1961 |
| | 10 | Ashraf El-Kordy | 21 – 15 January 1967 | 1.96 m (6 ft 5 in) |
| | 11 | Emad El-Din Mahmoud Ali | 22 – 21 March 1966 | 2.02 m (6 ft 8 in) |
| | 12 | Hisham Khalil | 24 – 8 November 1963 | 2.03 m (6 ft 8 in) |
| | 13 | Mohamed El-Shakeri | 19 – 7 November 1968 | 1.98 m (6 ft 6 in) |
| | 14 | El-Sayed Mohamed | 23 – 3 September 1965 | 1.90 m (6 ft 3 in) |
| | 15 | Ahmed Soliman | 22 – 11 December 1965 | 1.82 m (6 ft 0 in) |

Legend

- Club – describes last
  club before the tournament
- Age – describes age
  on 17 September 1988

Group play

| Pos | Team | Pld | W | L | PF | PA | PD | Pts | Qualification |
|---|---|---|---|---|---|---|---|---|---|
| 1 | United States | 5 | 5 | 0 | 485 | 302 | +183 | 10 | Quarterfinals |
| 2 | Spain | 5 | 4 | 1 | 484 | 435 | +49 | 9 | Quarterfinals |
| 3 | Brazil | 5 | 3 | 2 | 590 | 522 | +68 | 8 | Quarterfinals |
| 4 | Canada | 5 | 2 | 3 | 479 | 455 | +24 | 7 | Quarterfinals |
| 5 | China | 5 | 1 | 4 | 433 | 527 | −94 | 6 | 9th–12th classification round |
| 6 | Egypt | 5 | 0 | 5 | 338 | 568 | −230 | 5 | 9th–12th classification round |

Source: FIBA archive
Rules for classification: 1) points; 2) head-to-head points; 3) head-to-head goal average; 4) head-to-head number of points scored.

17 September 1988

| China | 98–84 | Egypt |
Scoring by half: 47–43, 51–41

Jamsil Gymnasium, Seoul

20 September 1988

| Egypt | 70–113 | Spain |
Scoring by half: 44–57, 26–56

Jamsil Gymnasium, Seoul

21 September 1988

| Canada | 117–64 | Egypt |
Scoring by half: 61–32, 56–32

Jamsil Gymnasium, Seoul

23 September 1988

| Brazil | 138–85 | Egypt |
Scoring by half: 66–38, 72–47

Jamsil Gymnasium, Seoul

24 September 1988

| Egypt | 35–102 | United States |
Scoring by half: 21–62, 14–40

Jamsil Gymnasium, Seoul

Classification round 9–12

26 September 1988
09:45

Boxscore

| Central African Republic | 63–57 | Egypt |
Scoring by half: 33–31, 30–26
| Pts: F. Goporo, Bella 15; Rebs: Lavodrama 16; Asts: Lavodrama 7 | | Pts: Khalil 17; Rebs: Khalil 8 Asts: Amir 4 |

Jamsil Gymnasium, Seoul

Classification round 11/12

29 September 1988
14:30

Boxscore

| Egypt | 75–97 | China |
Scoring by half: 42–56, 33–41
| Pts: Khalil 26; Rebs: Moussa 6 Asts: Moussa, Sedky 1 | | Pts: Zhang Y. 33; Rebs: Song 12; Asts: Sun, Wang L., Zhang Y. 3 |

Jamsil Gymnasium, Seoul

== Boxing ==
| Athlete | Event | Round of 64 | Round of 32 | Round of 16 | Quarterfinals | Semifinals | Final | |
| Athlete | Event | Opposition Result | Opposition Result | Opposition Result | Opposition Result | Opposition Result | Opposition Result | Rank |
|---|---|---|---|---|---|---|---|---|
| Moustafa Esmail | Light flyweight | Bye | Serantes (PHI); L RSC R2 | Did not advance | | | | |
| Gamal El-Din El-Koumy | Flyweight | Hussain (IRQ); W 4–1 | Gül (TUR); W 4–1 | Todorov (BUL); L Walkover | Did not advance | | | |
| Mohamed Hegazi | Lightweight | Ranamagar (NEP); W 5–0 | Onoko (NGR); W 5–0 | Saïd (ALG); W 5–0 | Zülow (GDR); L 0–5 | Did not advance | | |
| Ahmed El-Nagar | Light heavyweight | —N/a | Nanton (VIN); W Walkover | Collins (GRN); W 5–0 | Petrich (POL); L 0–5 | Did not advance | | |

== Equestrian ==
=== Jumping ===
| Athlete | Horse | Event | Qualification | | | | | | Final | |
| Athlete | Horse | Event | Round 1 | | Round 2 | | Total | | Final | |
| Athlete | Horse | Event | Score | Rank | Score | Rank | Score | Rank | Penalties | Rank |
|---|---|---|---|---|---|---|---|---|---|---|
| André Salah Sakakini | Tric Trac 2 | Individual | 0.00 | 71 | 33.00 | 41 | 33.00 | 58 | Did not advance | |

== Fencing ==
Two fencers, both men, represented Egypt in 1988.

Individual
Pool stages

| Athlete | Event | Group Stage 1 | | | | | | Group Stage 2 | | | | | | Group Stage 3 | | | | |
| Athlete | Event | Opposition Result | Opposition Result | Opposition Result | Opposition Result | Opposition Result | Rank | Opposition Result | Opposition Result | Opposition Result | Opposition Result | Opposition Result | Rank | Opposition Result | Opposition Result | Opposition Result | Opposition Result | Rank |
|---|---|---|---|---|---|---|---|---|---|---|---|---|---|---|---|---|---|---|
| Abdel Monem El-Husseini | Men's foil | Gey (FRG); L 3–5 | Strand (SWE); W 5–1 | Turiace (ARG); W 5–3 | Fonseca (BRA); W 5–2 | —N/a | 2 Q | Bel (FRA); L 2–5 | Koretsky (URS); L 3–5 | Emura (JPN); L 2–5 | Harper (GBR); W 5–4 | Littell (USA); W 5–2 | 4 Q | Wagner (GDR); L 0–5 | Szekeres (HUN); L 0–5 | Gey (FRG); L 3–5 | Cerioni (ITA); W 5–4 | 5 |
| Ahmed Mohamed | Men's foil | Numa (ITA); L 3–5 | Howe (GDR); L 2–5 | Marx (USA); W 5–1 | Cornet (PAR); W 5–0 | Kim (KOR); L 4–5 | 4 Q | Gátai (HUN); L 2–5 | Strand (SWE); L 3–5 | Sypniewski (POL); L 2–5 | Wagner (GDR); L 3–5 | Lao (CHN); L 4–5 | 5 | Did not advance | | | | |

== Judo ==
| Athlete | Event | Round of 64 | Round of 32 | Round of 16 | Quarterfinals | Semifinals | Repechage | | | Final | |
| Athlete | Event | Round of 64 | Round of 32 | Round of 16 | Quarterfinals | Semifinals | Round 1 | Round 2 | Round 3 | Final | |
| Athlete | Event | Opposition Result | Opposition Result | Opposition Result | Opposition Result | Opposition Result | Opposition Result | Opposition Result | Opposition Result | Opposition Result | Rank |
|---|---|---|---|---|---|---|---|---|---|---|---|
| Emad El-Din Hassan | 60 kg | Bye | Roux (FRA); L Yusei-gachi | Did not advance | | | | | | | |
| Walid Mohamed Hussain (Note: also known as Walid Abdulhalim; also competed in the 1984 Summer Olympics) | 78 kg | Németh (HUN); W Koka | Legień (POL); L Ippon | Did not advance | | | García (ARG); L Ippon | Did not advance | | | |
| Mohamed Ali Rashwan | +95 kg | —N/a | Bye | Bergmann (ISL); W Ippon | Saito (JPN); L Ippon | Did not advance | —N/a | | Zapryanov (BUL); L Yusei-gachi | Did not advance | |

There was also a women's deomonstration event. (Note: Women's judo was included in the 1988 Summer Olympics as a demonstration event, in which Egypt was represented by two participants: Rehab El-Gafy - Extra-Lightweight (up to 45kg): DNS; and Naglaa Mohamed - Lightweight (56 kg): equal 5th)

== Modern pentathlon ==
Three male pentathletes represented Egypt in 1988.

| Athlete | Event | Riding (show jumping) | | | Fencing (épée one touch) | | | Swimming (300 m freestyle) | | | Shooting (Rapid fire pistol) | | | Running (4000 m) | | | Total points | Final rank |
| Athlete | Event | Penalties | Rank | MP points | Results | Rank | MP points | Time | Rank | MP points | Points | Rank | MP Points | Time | Rank | MP Points | Total points | Final rank |
|---|---|---|---|---|---|---|---|---|---|---|---|---|---|---|---|---|---|---|
| Moustafa Adam | Individual | 88 | 16 | 1012 | 29–36 | 39 | 728 | 3:36.67 | 45 | 1140 | 190 | 31 | 912 | 15:24.42 | 60 | 793 | 4585 | 49 |
| Mohamed Abdou El-Souad | Individual | 0 | 1 | 1100 | 27–38 | 46 | 694 | 3:45.22 | 60 | 1072 | 196 | 4 | 1044 | 14:34.05 | 50 | 943 | 4853 | 31 |
| Ayman Mahmoud | Individual | 154 | 34 | 946 | 22–43 | 58 | 609 | 3:32.32 | 35 | 1176 | 189 | 34 | 890 | 13:57.17 | 33 | 1054 | 4675 | 45 |
| Moustafa Adam; Mohamed Abdou El-Souad; Ayman Mahmoud | Team | 242 | 1 | 3058 | 78–117 | 16 | 2031 | 10:54.21 | 14 | 3388 | 575 | 6 | 2846 | 43:55.64 | 16 | 2790 | 14113 | 12 |

== Shooting ==
Mixed

| Athlete | Event | Qualification | | Final | |
| Athlete | Event | Points | Rank | Points | Rank |
|---|---|---|---|---|---|
| Sherif Saleh | Trap | 142 | 25 | Did not advance | |
| Mohamed Khorshed | Skeet | 143 | 33 | Did not advance | |

== Swimming ==
Men

| Athlete | Event | Heats | | Final A/B | |
| Athlete | Event | Time | Rank | Time | Rank |
|---|---|---|---|---|---|
| Ahmed Abdullah | 200 metre butterfly | 2:05.28 | 31 | Did not advance | |
| Amin Amer | 100 metre backstroke | 1:00.76 | 39 | Did not advance | |
| Moustafa Amer | 100 metre freestyle | 53.57 | 45 | Did not advance | |
| Moustafa Amer | 200 metre freestyle | 1:57.50 | 47 | Did not advance | |
| Mohamed El-Azoul | 50 metre freestyle | 24.64 | 42 | Did not advance | |
| Mohamed Hassan | 50 metre freestyle | 25.11 | 48 | Did not advance | |
| Mohamed El-Azoul; Amin Amer; Mohamed Hassan; Moustafa Amer | 4 × 100 metre freestyle relay | DQ | | Did not advance | |

== Table tennis ==
Men

| Athlete | Event | Group Stage | | | | | | | | Round of 16 | Quarterfinal | Semifinal | Final | |
| Athlete | Event | Opposition Result | Opposition Result | Opposition Result | Opposition Result | Opposition Result | Opposition Result | Opposition Result | Rank | Opposition Result | Opposition Result | Opposition Result | Opposition Result | Rank |
|---|---|---|---|---|---|---|---|---|---|---|---|---|---|---|
| Sherif El-Saket | Singles | Kim (KOR); L 0–3 | Domuschiev (BUL); L 1–3 | Persson (SWE); L 0–3 | Molenda (POL); L 1–3 | Saito (JPN); L 0–3 | Gambra (CHI); L 0–3 | Mehta (IND); L 0–3 | 8 | Did not advance | | | | |
| Ashraf Helmy | Singles | Douglas (GBR); L 0–3 | Huang (TPE); L 0–3 | Saif (PAK); W 3–1 | Kalinić (YUG); L 0–3 | Kano (BRA); L 0–3 | Fermín (DOM); W 3–1 | Lindh (SWE); L 0–3 | 7 | Did not advance | | | | |

Women

| Athlete | Event | Group Stage | | | | | | Round of 16 | Quarterfinal | Semifinal | Final | |
| Athlete | Event | Opposition Result | Opposition Result | Opposition Result | Opposition Result | Opposition Result | Rank | Opposition Result | Opposition Result | Opposition Result | Opposition Result | Rank |
|---|---|---|---|---|---|---|---|---|---|---|---|---|
| Nihal Meshref | Singles | Vriesekoop (NED); L 0–3 | Perkučin (YUG); L 0–3 | Gergelcheva (BUL); L 0–3 | Kim de Rimasa (ARG); L 1–3 | Šafářová (TCH); L 0–3 | 6 | Did not advance | | | | |

== Weightlifting ==
| Athlete | Event | Snatch | | Clean & jerk | | Total | Rank |
| Athlete | Event | Result | Rank | Result | Rank | Total | Rank |
|---|---|---|---|---|---|---|---|
| Ramadan Aly | 52 kg | 100.0 | 10 | NM | | DNF | |
| Khalil El-Sayed | 75 kg | 142.5 | 12 | 172.5 | 16 | 315.0 | 13 |
| Mahmoud Mahgoub | 90 kg | NM | | DNF | | | |
| Reda El-Batoty | +110 kg | 175.0 | 4 | 217.5 | 6 | 392.5 | 6 |
| Adhan Mohamed | +110 kg | 152.5 | 11 | 190.0 | 11 | 342.5 | 12 |

== Wrestling ==
Greco-Roman

| Athlete | Event | Group Stage | | | | | | | | Final | |
| Athlete | Event | Opposition Result | Opposition Result | Opposition Result | Opposition Result | Opposition Result | Opposition Result | Opposition Result | Rank | Opposition Result | Rank |
|---|---|---|---|---|---|---|---|---|---|---|---|
| Abdellatif Abdellatif | 68 kg | Lagerborg (SWE); L 0–9 | Koçak (TUR); L Fall | Did not advance | | | —N/a | | 12 | Did not advance | |
| Moustafa Ramadan Hussein | 82 kg | N'To (CMR); W Fall | Stoykov (BUL); L Passivity | Komáromi (HUN); L 0–17 | Did not advance | | | —N/a | 7 | Did not advance | |
| Kamal Ibrahim | 90 kg | Bernstein (ISR); L 8–11 | Bye | Leitão (BRA); W 17–0 | Pikilidis (GRE); L 0–9 | Did not advance | —N/a | | 5 | Did not advance | |
| Hassan El-Hadad | 130 kg | Ramsaran (MRI); W Fall | Jassim (IRQ); W Passivity | Deguchi (JPN); W Fall | Gerovski (BUL); L 0–5 | Bye | —N/a | | 2 | Johansson (SWE); L Passivity | 4 |

Freestyle

| Athlete | Event | Group Stage | | | | | | | | Final | |
| Athlete | Event | Opposition Result | Opposition Result | Opposition Result | Opposition Result | Opposition Result | Opposition Result | Opposition Result | Rank | Opposition Result | Rank |
|---|---|---|---|---|---|---|---|---|---|---|---|
| Mohamed El-Khodary | 68 kg | Manzur (ESA); W 19–3 | Khadem (IRI); L 0–16 | Wattar (SYR); L 3–14 | Did not advance | | | | 9 | Did not advance | |
| Moustafa Ramadan Hussein | 82 kg | Ito (JPN); L 0–4 | Iglesias (ARG); W 10–5 | Nikolovski (YUG); L 4–6 | Did not advance | | | —N/a | 10 | Did not advance | |
| Hassan El-Hadad | 130 kg | Baumgartner (USA); L DQ | Did not advance | | | —N/a | | | 8 | Did not advance | |
