= EuroLeague individual highs =

The EuroLeague individual highs for players in single games played. These are the lists of the individual statistical single game highs of the EuroLeague, which is the top-tier level European-wide professional club basketball league. The individual stats single game highs are broken down by sections of time, based on who organized the league and when certain statistics were officially counted.

From 1958 to 2000, the competition was run by solely FIBA. Under FIBA's organization, the competition was initially called the FIBA European Champions' Cup, and was later first renamed to the FIBA European League, and finally to the FIBA EuroLeague. During the 2000–01 season, the competition was split into two different leagues for just that one season.

There was the then newly formed 2000–01 EuroLeague competition organized by EuroLeague Basketball (EB), which its EuroLeague name. There was also the new version of FIBA's competition, which was renamed from the FIBA EuroLeague to the FIBA SuproLeague. While the EuroLeague Basketball competition kept the original EuroLeague name of the competition, FIBA's league kept the original ending format of the competition, as it retained the EuroLeague Final Four event, which was renamed from the FIBA EuroLeague Final Four, to the FIBA SuproLeague Final Four.

For the following 2001–02 season, FIBA cancelled its SuproLeague competition, and EuroLeague Basketball's competition gained all of the competition's major clubs, as well as the Final Four format, which was then renamed back to the EuroLeague Final Four. EuroLeague Basketball's competition officially recognized all of the seasons of FIBA's competitions, including all of its Finals, Final Fours, league champions, stats, records, and awards. The stats, records, and awards from the two competitions are categorized by each individual organizing body (EB and FIBA).

Points scored has been kept as an official basketball stat of the EuroLeague, since its inaugural 1958 season. Starting with the 1984–85 season, attempted and made 3-point field goals also became official statistics. Since the 1991–92 season, rebounds, assists, steals, double-doubles, and triple-doubles have also been kept as official stats of the competition. Blocks were added as an official stat of the competition in 1999, during the second half of the 1998–99 season. The Performance Index Rating (PIR) has been kept as an official stat of the competition since the EB era began, starting with the EuroLeague 2000–01 season.

== EuroLeague Basketball (since the year 2000) ==
- Nationalities by national team:

=== 40+ points in a game (since the year 2000) ===
Since the beginning of the 2000–01 season (EuroLeague Basketball era):

Rank	Player	Team	Points	Date	Season	Phase	Versus	Ref.
1	(United States) Nigel Hayes-Davis	(Turkey) Fenerbahçe Basketball	50	March 29, 2024	2023–24	Regular Season	(Germany) Alba Berlin	
2	(Turkey) Shane Larkin	(Turkey) Anadolu Efes	49	November 29, 2019	2019–20	Regular Season	(Germany) Bayern Munich	
3	(Bulgaria) Sasha Vezenkov	(Greece) Olympiacos	45	January 10, 2025	2024–25	Regular Season	(Germany) Bayern Munich	
4	(United States) Kevin Punter	(Spain) FC Barcelona	43	December 19, 2025	2025–26	Regular Season	(Spain) Baskonia	
5	(Montenegro) Tyrese Rice	(Greece) Panathinaikos	41	December 6, 2019	2019–20	Regular Season	(Greece) Olympiacos	
5	(United States) Bobby Brown	(Italy) Montepaschi Siena	41	January 4, 2013	2012–13	Top 16	(Turkey) Fenerbahçe	
5	(Latvia) Kaspars Kambala	(Turkey) Efes Pilsen	41	October 30, 2002	2002–03	Regular Season	(Spain) FC Barcelona	
5	(Italy) Carlton Myers	(Italy) Fortitudo Bologna	41	March 7, 2001	2000–01	Playoffs	(Spain) Real Madrid	
5	(United States) Alphonso Ford	(Greece) Peristeri	41	January 31, 2001	2000–01	Playoffs	(Spain) Tau Ceramica	
10	(Turkey) Shane Larkin (2)	(Turkey) Anadolu Efes	40	March 6, 2020	2019–20	Regular Season	(Greece) Olympiacos	
10	(United States) Marc Salyers	(France) Chorale Roanne	40	November 17, 2007	2007–08	Regular Season	(Turkey) Fenerbahçe	
10	(Lithuania) Arvydas Macijauskas	(Spain) Tau Ceramica	40	December 17, 2003	2002–03	Regular Season	(France) ASVEL Basket	
10	(Federal Republic of Yugoslavia) Vlado Šćepanović	(Federal Republic of Yugoslavia) Partizan	40	January 9, 2002	2001–02	Regular Season	(Russia) Ural Great	
10	(Bosnia and Herzegovina) Džanan Musa	(Spain) Real Madrid	40	January 5, 2024	2023–24	Regular Season	(Turkey) Anadolu Efes	

=== 20+ rebounds in a game (since the year 2000) ===
Since the beginning of the 2000–01 season (EuroLeague Basketball era):

Rank	Player	Team	Rebounds	Date	Season	Phase	Versus	Ref.
1	(Greece) Antonis Fotsis	(Russia) Dynamo Moscow	24	March 21, 2007	2006–07	Top 16	(Italy) Benetton Basket	
2	(Turkey) Mirsad Türkcan	(Russia) CSKA Moscow	23	January 10, 2002	2001–02	Regular Season	(Federal Republic of Yugoslavia) Budućnost	
3	(Lithuania) Donatas Motiejūnas	(Poland) Asseco Prokom	21	July 12, 2011	2011–12	Regular Season	(Slovenia) Olimpija Ljubljana	
3	(Turkey) Mirsad Türkcan (2)	(Turkey) Fenerbahçe	21	November 30, 2006	2006–07	Regular Season	(Italy) Eldo Napoli	
3	(Turkey) Mirsad Türkcan (3)	(Russia) CSKA Moscow	21	March 10, 2004	2003–04	Top 16	(Croatia) Cibona	
3	(Turkey) Mirsad Türkcan (4)	(Italy) Montepaschi Siena	21	January 8, 2003	2002–03	Regular Season	(Spain) Tau Ceramica	
8	(Republic of Ireland) Pat Burke	(Poland) Asseco Prokom	20	December 18, 2008	2008–09	Regular Season	(Lithuania) Žalgiris	
8	(Spain) Jordi Trias	(Spain) FC Barcelona	20	January 31, 2008	2007–08	Regular Season	(Germany) Brose Baskets	
8	(Azerbaijan) Spencer Nelson	(Germany) GHP Bamberg	20	December 22, 2005	2005–06	Regular Season	(Italy) Benetton Basket	
8	(Federal Republic of Yugoslavia) Dejan Milojević	(Federal Republic of Yugoslavia) Partizan	20	November 11, 2004	2004–05	Regular Season	(Spain) Adecco Estudiantes	
8	(Cameroon) Stephane Pelle	(France) ASVEL Basket	20	November 11, 2004	2004–05	Regular Season	(Italy) Scavolini Pesaro	
8	(France) Florent Piétrus	(France) Pau-Orthez	20	December 13, 2001	2001–02	Regular Season	(Russia) CSKA Moscow	
8	(Serbia) Nikola Milutinov	(Greece) Olympiacos	20	January 18, 2024	2023–24	Regular Season	(Israel) Maccabi Tel Aviv	
8	(Lithuania) Jonas Valančiūnas	(Lithuania) Žalgiris	20	November 17, 2026	2026–27	Regular Season	(Italy) Olimpia Milan	

=== 15+ assists in a game (since the year 2000) ===
Since the beginning of the 2000–01 season (EuroLeague Basketball era):

Rank	Player	Team	Assists	Date	Season	Phase	Versus	Ref.
1	(Bulgaria) Codi Miller-McIntyre	(Spain) Saski Baskonia	20	February 8, 2024	2023–24	Regular season	(France) ASVEL Basket	
2	(Argentina) Facundo Campazzo	(Spain) Real Madrid	19	February 6, 2020	2019–20	Regular Season	(Germany) Alba Berlin	
2	(Serbia) Stefan Jović	(Serbia) Crvena Zvezda	19	November 12, 2015	2015–16	Regular Season	(Germany) Bayern Munich	
4	(Greece) Nick Calathes	(Greece) Panathinaikos	18	January 3, 2020	2019–20	Regular Season	(Russia) CSKA Moscow	
4	(Greece) Nick Calathes (2)	(Greece) Panathinaikos	18	April 4, 2019	2018–19	Regular Season	(Montenegro) Budućnost	
6	(United States) Marcus Williams	(Serbia) Crvena Zvezda	17	November 21, 2014	2014–15	Regular Season	(Turkey) Galatasaray	
6	(Argentina) Facundo Campazzo (2)	(Spain) Real Madrid	17	December 5, 2019	2019–20	Regular Season	(Spain) Valencia	
6	(Greece) Nick Calathes (3)	(Greece) Panathinaikos	17	January 24, 2020	2019–20	Regular Season	(France) ASVEL Basket	
9	(Greece) Nick Calathes (4)	(Greece) Panathinaikos	16	April 17, 2018	2017–18	Playoffs	(Spain) Real Madrid	
10	(Greece) Nick Calathes (5)	(Spain) Barcelona	15	January 12, 2021	2020–21	Regular Season	(Russia) Khimki	
10	(Greece) Nick Calathes (6)	(Greece) Panathinaikos	15	October 24, 2019	2019–20	Regular Season	(Russia) Zenit Saint Petersburg	
10	(Argentina) Facundo Campazzo (3)	(Spain) Real Madrid	15	May 19, 2019	2018–19	Final Four	(Turkey) Fenerbahçe	
10	(Canada) Kevin Pangos	(Lithuania) Žalgiris	15	January 18, 2018	2017–18	Regular Season	(Spain) Valencia	
10	(France) Thomas Heurtel	(Turkey) Anadolu Efes	15	February 3, 2017	2016–17	Regular Season	(Serbia) Crvena Zvezda	
10	(Greece) Vassilis Spanoulis	(Greece) Olympiacos	15	October 27, 2016	2016–17	Regular Season	(Spain) Saski Baskonia	
10	(France) Thomas Heurtel (2)	(Turkey) Anadolu Efes	15	October 16, 2015	2015–16	Regular Season	(France) Limoges CSP	
10	(France) Thomas Heurtel (3)	(Turkey) Anadolu Efes	15	April 17, 2015	2014–15	Playoffs	(Spain) Real Madrid	
10	(Montenegro) Taylor Rochestie	(Russia) Nizhny Novgorod	15	January 23, 2015	2014–15	Top 16	(Turkey) Anadolu Efes	
10	(United States) John Linehan	(France) SLUC Nancy	15	November 3, 2011	2011–12	Regular Season	(Turkey) Fenerbahçe	

=== 8+ steals in a game (since the year 2000) ===
Since the beginning of the 2000–01 season (EuroLeague Basketball era):

Rank	Player	Team	Steals	Date	Season	Phase	Versus	Ref.
1	(United States) Jeff Trepagnier	(Turkey) Ulker	11	January 26, 2006	2005–06	Regular Season	(Federal Republic of Yugoslavia) Partizan	
2	(Italy) Stefano Mancinelli	(Italy) Climamio Bologna	10	January 4, 2007	2006–07	Regular Season	(Russia) Dynamo Moscow	
3	(Argentina) Pablo Prigioni	(Spain) Tau Ceramica	9	February 9, 2006	2005–06	Regular Season	(France) Strasbourg	
3	(United States) Chris Williams	(Germany) Opel Skyliners	9	December 15, 2004	2003–04	Regular Season	(Russia) CSKA Moscow	
3	(United States) Fred House	(Federal Republic of Yugoslavia) Partizan	9	December 11, 2003	2003–04	Regular Season	(Spain) FC Barcelona	
6	(Israel) Yogev Ohayon	(Israel) Maccabi Tel Aviv	8	November 20, 2014	2014–15	Regular Season	(France) Limoges CSP	
6	(Italy) Shaun Stonerook	(Italy) Montepaschi Siena	8	April 1, 2008	2007–08	Playoffs	(Turkey) Fenerbahçe	
6	(Bulgaria) Ibby Jaaber	(Italy) Lottomatica Roma	8	February 21, 2008	2007–08	Top 16	(Spain) Unicaja Malaga	
6	(United States) Bootsy Thornton	(Italy) Montepaschi Siena	8	February 14, 2008	2007–08	Top 16	(Serbia) Partizan	
6	(United States) David Vanterpool	(Italy) Montepaschi Siena	8	March 11, 2004	2003–04	Top 16	(Greece) Panathinaikos	

=== 6+ blocks in a game (since the year 2000) ===
Since the beginning of the 2000–01 season (EuroLeague Basketball era):

Rank	Player	Team	Blocks	Date	Season	Phase	Versus	Ref.
1	(Croatia) Stojko Vranković	(Italy) PAF Bologna	10	February 8, 2001	2000–01	Playoffs	(Croatia) Cibona	
2	(Ukraine) Grigorij Khizhnyak	(Lithuania) Žalgiris	8	December 14, 2000	2000–01	Regular Season	(Spain) Adecco Estudiantes	
2	(France) Moustapha Fall	(Greece) Olympiacos	8	December 22, 2023	2023–24	Regular Season	(France) ASVEL Basket	
3	(Nigeria) Ekpe Udoh	(Turkey) Fenerbahçe	7	February 11, 2016	2015–16	Top 16	(Spain) Unicaja Malaga	
3	(United States) Loren Woods	(Lithuania) Žalgiris	7	December 18, 2008	2008–09	Regular Season	(Poland) Asseco Prokom	
3	(Lithuania) Darjuš Lavrinovič	(Lithuania) Žalgiris	7	March 17, 2005	2004–05	Top 16	(Greece) Panathinaikos	
3	(Ukraine) Grigorij Khizhnyak (2)	(Lithuania) Žalgiris	7	November 1, 2001	2001–02	Regular Season	(Germany) Opel Skyliners	
3	(Ukraine) Grigorij Khizhnyak (3)	(Lithuania) Žalgiris	7	October 18, 2001	2001–02	Regular Season	(Turkey) Ulker	
8	15 players		6					

=== 8+ 3 pointers made in a game (since the year 2000) ===
Since the beginning of the 2000–01 season (EuroLeague Basketball era):

Rank	Player	Team	3 Pointers	Date	Season	Phase	Versus
1	(Germany) Andreas Obst	(Germany) Bayern Munich	11	November 22, 2024	2024–25	Regular Season	(Spain) Barcelona
2	(Turkey) Shane Larkin	(Turkey) Efes Istanbul	10	March 6, 2020	2019–20	Regular Season	(Greece) Olympiacos
2	(United States) Drew Goudelock	(Turkey) Fenerbahçe Istanbul	10	November 13, 2014	2014–15	Regular Season	(Germany) Bayern Munich
2	(Turkey) Shane Larkin (2)	(Turkey) Efes Istanbul	10	November 29, 2019	2019–20	Regular Season	(Germany) Bayern Munich
3	(Poland) Thomas Kelati	(Spain) Málaga	9	March 4, 2009	2008–09	Top 16	(Italy) Roma
3	(Turkey) Nigel Hayes-Davis	(Turkey) Fenerbahçe Basketball	9	March 29, 2024	2023–24	Regular Season	(Germany) Alba Berlin
3	(Bosnia and Herzegovina) Mirza Teletović	(Spain) Saski Baskonia	9	December 15, 2010	2010–11	Regular Season	(Lithuania) Žalgiris Kaunas
3	(Lithuania) Saulius Štombergas	(Spain) Saski Baskonia	9	April 4, 2001	2000–01	Playoffs	(Greece) AEK Athens
3	(United States) Daryl Macon	(Greece) Panathinaikos	9	October 27, 2021	2021-22	Regular Season	(Turkey) Anadolu Efes Instanbul
4	11 players		8				

=== Performance Index Rating (since the year 2000) ===
Since the beginning of the 2000–01 season (EuroLeague Basketball era):

Rank	Player	Team	PIR	Date	Season	Phase	Versus
1	(United States) Tanoka Beard	(Lithuania) Žalgiris	63	January 22, 2004	2003–04	Regular Season	(Italy) Skipper Bologna
2	(Federal Republic of Yugoslavia) Dejan Milojević	(Federal Republic of Yugoslavia) Partizan	55	December 2, 2004	2004–05	Regular Season	(Greece) Olympiacos
2	(Slovenia) Jaka Lakovič	(Slovenia) Krka	55	October 18, 2001	2001–02	Regular Season	(Spain) Real Madrid
4	(Croatia) Marko Popović	(Croatia) Cibona	54	November 25, 2004	2004–05	Regular Season	(Spain) Adecco Estudiantes
5	(Turkey) Shane Larkin	(Turkey) Anadolu Efes	53	November 29, 2019	2019–20	Regular Season	(Germany) Bayern Munich
6	(Bulgaria) Sasha Vezenkov	(Greece) Olympiacos	52	January 10, 2025	2024–25	Regular Season	(Germany) Bayern Munich
7	(United States) Mike James	(Russia) CSKA Moscow	51	December 11, 2020	2020–21	Regular season	(Russia) Khimki
7	(Slovenia) Jaka Lakovič (2)	(Greece) Panathinaikos	51	March 25, 2004	2003–04	Top 16	(Spain) Real Madrid
9	(United States) Bobby Brown	(Italy) Montepaschi Siena	50	January 4, 2013	2012–13	Top 16	(Turkey) Fenerbahçe
9	(Belgium) Tomas Van Den Spiegel	(Poland) Prokom Trefl	50	November 14, 2007	2007–08	Regular Season	(Italy) Virtus VidiVici
9	(Lithuania) Arvydas Macijauskas	(Spain) Tau Ceramica	50	December 17, 2003	2003–04	Regular Season	(France) ASVEL Basket

== FIBA EuroLeague & FIBA SuproLeague (1991–2001) ==
- Nationalities by national team:

=== 40+ points in a game (1991–2001) ===
From the 1991–92 season to the 2000–01 SuproLeague season (FIBA era):

Rank	Player	Team	Points	Season	Versus	Ref.
1	(United States) Joe Arlauckas	(Spain) Real Madrid	63	1995–96	(Italy) Buckler Bologna	
2	(United States) Michael Young	(France) Limoges CSP	47	1993–94	(Italy) Benetton Treviso	
3	(Greece) Nikos Galis	(Greece) Aris	46	1991–92	(Italy) Philips Milano	
4	(Portugal) Carlos Lisboa	(Portugal) SL Benfica	45	1995–96	(Federal Republic of Yugoslavia) Partizan Belgrade	
4	(Croatia) Velimir Perasović	(Croatia) Split	45	1991–92	(Croatia) Cibona Zagreb	
4	(Croatia) Ivica Žurić	(Croatia) Cibona Zagreb	45	1993–94	(Italy) Buckler Bologna	
7	(Greece) Nikos Galis (2)	(Greece) Aris	44	1991–92	(Spain) Joventut Badalona	
7	(Greece) Nikos Galis (3)	(Greece) Aris	44	1991–92	(Netherlands) Den Helder	
9	(United States) Tony Dawson	(Germany) Bayer Leverkusen	43	1996–97	(Italy) Kinder Bologna	
10	(Croatia) Zdravko Radulović	(Croatia) Cibona Zagreb	42	1991–92	(France) Olympique d'Antibes	
10	(Croatia) Zdravko Radulović (2)	(Croatia) Cibona Zagreb	42	1991–92	(Croatia) Split	
12	(United States) Mike Vreeswyk	(Netherlands) Den Bosch	41	1993–94	(Poland) Śląsk Wrocław	
12	(United States) Buck Johnson	(Israel) Hapoel Tel Aviv	41	1994–95	(Greece) PAOK	
12	(Turkey) İbrahim Kutluay	(Turkey) Fenerbahçe	41	1998–99	(Croatia) Cibona Zagreb	
13	(Greece) Nikos Galis (4)	(Greece) Aris	40	1991–92	(Spain) Estudiantes	
13	(Croatia) Zdravko Radulović (3)	(Croatia) Cibona Zagreb	40	1991–92	(Italy) Phonola Caserta	
13	(Croatia) Arijan Komazec	(Italy) Virtus Bologna	40	1996–97	(Spain) FC Barcelona	
13	(Croatia) Zdravko Radulović (4)	(Croatia) Cibona Zagreb	40	1992–93	(Finland) NMKY Helsinki	
13	(United States) Tony Dawson (2)	(Germany) TSV Bayer 04	40	1995–96	(Ukraine) Budivelnyk Kyiv	

=== 20+ rebounds in a game (1991–2001) ===
From the 1991–92 season to the 2000–01 SuproLeague season (FIBA era):

Rank	Player	Team	Rebounds	Season	Versus	Ref.
1	(Greece) Michalis Romanidis	(Greece) Aris Thessaloniki	30	1991–92	(Netherlands) BV Den Helder	
1	(United States) John Pinone	(Spain) Estudiantes	30	1991–92	(Greece) Aris	
3	(Croatia) Predrag Šarić	(Croatia) Zadar	25	1992–93	(Spain) Real Madrid	
3	(Lithuania) Arvydas Sabonis	(Spain) Real Madrid	24	1992–93	(Greece) Olympiacos	
3	(United States) Joe Binion	(Italy) Buckler Bologna	24	1994–95	(Greece) Panathinaikos	
5	(Turkey) Rickie Winslow	(Spain) Estudiantes	23	1991–92	(Greece) Aris	
5	(United States) Cliff Levingston	(Greece) PAOK	23	1992–93	(Italy) Scavolini Pesaro	
5	(United States) Roy Tarpley	(Greece) Olympiacos	23	1993–94	(Germany) Bayer Leverkusen	
6	(United States) Orlando Phillips	(France) EB Pau Orthez	22	1992–93	(Greece) Olympiacos	
6	(Croatia) Emilio Kovačić	(Croatia) Cibona Zagreb	22	1993–94	(Turkey) Efes	
8	(United States) Lee Johnson	(France) Olympique d'Antibes	21	1991–92	(Estonia) Kalev Tallinn	
8	(Germany) Chris Welp	(Germany) TSV Bayer 04	21	1992–93	(Iceland) Keflavík	
8	(United States) Tony Massenburg	(Spain) FC Barcelona	21	1993–94	(France) CSP Limoges	
8	(Lithuania) Arvydas Sabonis (2)	(Spain) Real Madrid	21	1993–94	(Germany) Bayer Leverkusen	
8	(Croatia) Stojko Vranković	(Greece) Panathinaikos	21	1994–95	(Israel) Maccabi Tel Aviv	
8	(United States) Warren Kidd	(Italy) Stefanel Milano	21	1996–97	(Greece) Olympiacos	
8	(Turkey) Hüseyin Beşok	(Turkey) Efes	21	1998–99	(Italy) Varese	
8	(Croatia) Nikola Prkačin	(Croatia) Cibona Zagreb	21	1998–99	(France) EB Pau Orthez	
8	(Turkey) Hüseyin Beşok (2)	(Turkey) Efes	21	2000–01 SuproLeague	(Sweden) Plannja Luleå	
8	(Greece) Lazaros Papadopoulos	(Greece) Iraklis	21	2000–01 SuproLeague	(Germany) ALBA Berlin	
8	(Germany) Chris Welp (2)	(Germany) TSV Bayer 04	20	1991–92	(Spain) Joventut Badalona	
8	(Lithuania) Arvydas Sabonis (3)	(Spain) Real Madrid	20	1993–94	(England) Guildford Kings	
8	(Italy) Augusto Binelli	(Italy) Virtus Bologna	20	1993–94	(Portugal) Benfica Lisbon	
5	(United States) Roy Tarpley (2)	(Greece) Olympiacos	20	1993–94	(Germany) Bayer Leverkusen	
5	(United States) Roy Tarpley (3)	(Greece) Olympiacos	20	1993–94	(Italy) Benetton Treviso	
8	(Lithuania) Arvydas Sabonis (4)	(Spain) Real Madrid	20	1994–95	(Slovenia) Union Olimpija	
8	(Romania) Gheorghe Mureșan	(France) EB Pau Orthez	20	1995–96	(Slovenia) Union Olimpija	
8	(United States) Charles Shackleford	(Turkey) Ülker	20	1995–96	(Greece) Iraklis	
8	(Croatia) Žan Tabak	(Turkey) Fenerbahçe	20	1998–99	(Federal Republic of Yugoslavia) Red Star Belgrade	
8	(Greece) Lazaros Papadopoulos (2)	(Greece) Iraklis	20	2000–01 SuproLeague	(Slovenia) Krka Novo Mesto	

=== 13+ assists in a game (1991–2001) ===
From the 1991–92 season to the 2000–01 SuproLeague season (FIBA era):

Rank	Player	Team	Assists	Season	Versus	Ref.
1	(Portugal) Pedro Miguel	(Portugal) SL Benfica	17	1994–95	(Russia) CSKA Moscow	
1	(United States) Elmer Bennett	(Spain) Saski Baskonia	17	1998–99	(Lithuania) Žalgiris Kaunas	
1	(United States) Walter Berry	(Greece) Aris Thessaloniki	16	1991–92	(Poland) Śląsk Wrocław	
1	(United States) Keith Williams	(Poland) Śląsk Wrocław	16	1992–93	(Georgia (country)) Dinamo Tbilisi	
3	(Federal Republic of Yugoslavia) Miroslav Pecarski	(Greece) Aris Thessaloniki	15	1991–92	(Poland) Śląsk Wrocław	
3	(United States) Chuck Evans	(Russia) CSKA Moscow	15	1994–95	(Romania) CS Dinamo București	
3	(Latvia) Raimonds Miglinieks	(Poland) Śląsk Wrocław	15	2000–01 SuproLeague	(Italy) Mens Sana Basket	
4	(Russia) Vasily Karasev	(Russia) CSKA Moscow	14	1995–96	(France) EB Pau Orthez	
1	(United States) Keith Williams (2)	(Poland) Śląsk Wrocław	13	1991–92	(Greece) Aris	
5	(Russia) Vasily Karasev (2)	(Russia) CSKA Moscow	13	1995–96	(Germany) Bayer Leverkusen	
5	(North Macedonia) Petar Naumoski	(Turkey) Efes	13	1998–99	(Russia) CSKA Moscow	
5	(France) Laurent Sciarra	(France) ASVEL	13	2000–01 SuproLeague	(Greece) Panathinaikos	

=== 9+ steals in a game (1991–2001) ===
From the 1991–92 season to the 2000–01 SuproLeague season (FIBA era):

Rank	Player	Team	Steals	Season	Versus	Ref.
1	(France) Jimmy Nebot	(France) ASVEL Lyon	11	1996–97	(Turkey) Efes Istanbul	
1	(United States) Marcus Webb	(Russia) CSKA Moscow	11	1997–98	(Greece) PAOK	
2	(Greece) George Papadakos	(Greece) Olympiacos	10	1992–93	(Spain) Real Madrid	
2	(Greece) Panagiotis Giannakis	(Greece) Aris	9	1991–92	(Germany) Bayer Leverkusen	
2	(Italy) Chris Corchiani	(Turkey) Efes Istanbul	9	1994–95	(Sweden) Gothia	
2	(Italy) Chris Corchiani (2)	(Germany) Bayer Leverkusen	9	1995–96	(Spain) Unicaja Málaga	
2	(Lithuania) Saulius Štombergas	(Lithuania) Žalgiris Kaunas	9	1998–99	(Croatia) Cibona Zagreb	
2	(Federal Republic of Yugoslavia) Veselin Petrović	(Federal Republic of Yugoslavia) Partizan Belgrade	9	2000–01 SuproLeague	(Sweden) Plannja Luleå	

=== 5+ blocks in a game (1999–2001) ===
From 1999 to the 2000–01 SuproLeague season (FIBA era):

Rank	Player	Team	Blocks	Season	Versus	Ref.
1	(Turkey) Hüseyin Beşok	(Turkey) Efes	7	2000–01 SuproLeague	(Sweden) Plannja Luleå	
2	(Russia) Andrei Kirilenko	(Russia) CSKA Moscow	6	2000–01 SuproLeague	(Israel) Maccabi Ra'anana	
3	(United States) Conrad McRae	(Turkey) Fenerbahçe	5	1998–99	(Spain) Real Madrid	
3	(Greece) Efthymios Rentzias	(Spain) Barcelona	5	1999–00	(Turkey) Ülker	
3	(Federal Republic of Yugoslavia) Željko Rebrača	(Greece) Panathinaikos	5	1999–00	(Croatia) Cibona Zagreb	
3	(United States) Jason Lawson	(France) EB Pau Orthez	5	2000–01 SuproLeague	(Belgium) Oostende	
3	(Russia) Andrei Fetisov	(Russia) CSKA Moscow	5	2000–01 SuproLeague	(Turkey) Ülker	
3	(Lithuania) Robertas Javtokas	(Lithuania) Lietuvos Rytas	5	2000–01 SuproLeague	(Italy) Montepaschi Siena	
3	(Sweden) John Rosendahl	(Sweden) Plannja Luleå	5	2000–01 SuproLeague	(Turkey) Efes Istanbul	
3	(Russia) Andrei Fetisov (2)	(Russia) CSKA Moscow	5	2000–01 SuproLeague	(Israel) Maccabi Ra'anana	
3	(Russia) Andrei Kirilenko (2)	(Russia) CSKA Moscow	5	2000–01 SuproLeague	(Belgium) Oostende	

=== 8+ 3 pointers made in a game (1984–2001) ===
From the 1984–85 season to the 2000–01 SuproLeague season (FIBA era):

Rank	Player	Team	3 Pointers	Season	Versus
1	(Socialist Federal Republic of Yugoslavia) Dražen Petrović	(Socialist Federal Republic of Yugoslavia) Cibona Zagreb	10	1985–86	(France) CSP Limoges
1	(Portugal) Carlos Lisboa	(Portugal) S.L. Benfica Lisboa	10	1995–96	(Federal Republic of Yugoslavia) Partizan Belgrade
2	(United States) Brian Evans	(Italy) Montepaschi Siena	9	2000–01	(Greece) Panathinaikos
2	(Czechoslovakia) Oto Matický	(Austria) Traiskirchen Lions	9	1991–92	(Belgium) Antwerpen Mechelen
2	(Italy) Antonello Riva	(Italy) Olimpia Milano	9	1991–92	(Greece) Aris
3	13 players		8		

== Triple-Doubles (1991–present) ==
Since the beginning of the 1991–92 season (FIBA & EuroLeague Basketball eras):

FIBA era
EuroLeague Basketball era

Number	Player	Team	Triple Double	Season	Versus	Ref.
FIBA Era (1991–2001)
1	(United States) Keith Williams	(Poland) WKS Śląsk Wrocław	30 points, 10 rebounds, 16 assists	1992–93	(Georgia (country)) Dinamo Tbilisi	
2	(Russia) Vasily Karasev	(Russia) CSKA Moscow	21 points, 10 rebounds, 10 assists	1994–95	(Greece) Olympiacos	
3	(United States) Bill Edwards	(Greece) PAOK	24 points, 15 rebounds, 10 assists	1999–00	(France) Cholet	
4	(United States) Derrick Phelps	(Germany) ALBA Berlin	11 points, 10 rebounds, 12 assists	2000–01 SuproLeague	(Greece) Iraklis	
EuroLeague Basketball Era (2000–present)
5	(Croatia) Nikola Vujčić	(Israel) Maccabi Tel Aviv	11 points, 12 rebounds, 11 assists	2005–06	(Poland) Prokom Trefl	
6	(Croatia) Nikola Vujčić (2)	(Israel) Maccabi Tel Aviv	27 points, 10 rebounds, 10 assists	2006–07	(Slovenia) Olimpija Ljubljana	
7	(Greece) Nick Calathes	(Greece) Panathinaikos	11 points, 12 rebounds, 18 assists	2018–19	(Montenegro) Budućnost	
8	(Bulgaria) Codi Miller-McIntyre	(Spain) Saski Baskonia	11 points, 11 rebounds, 20 assists	2023-24	(France) ASVEL Basket	

== FIBA EuroLeague, FIBA SuproLeague & EuroLeague Basketball (1958–present) ==
- Nationalities by national team:

=== 40+ points in a game (1958–present) ===
From the 1958 FIBA European Champions Cup season to the 2000–01 FIBA SuproLeague season, and the Euroleague 2000–01 season to the present (FIBA & Euroleague Basketball eras):

The most points scored in a single EuroLeague game, since the competition began with the 1958 season, including all league formats up until the present time. Includes all games in which a player scored at least 40 points.

Game played during the EuroLeague Basketball era (2000–present).
EuroLeague Finals Game.

=== Players that scored 50 or more points in a single EuroLeague game ===
Rank	Player	Team	Points	Season	Versus	Ref.
1	(Socialist Federal Republic of Yugoslavia) Radivoj Korać	(Socialist Federal Republic of Yugoslavia) OKK Beograd	99	1964–65	(Sweden) Alviks	
2	(Socialist Federal Republic of Yugoslavia) Radivoj Korać	(Socialist Federal Republic of Yugoslavia) OKK Beograd	71	1964–65	(Sweden) Alviks	
3	(Belgium) Kamiel Dierckx	(Belgium) Racing Mechelen	63	1967–68	(Portugal) S.L. Benfica	
4	(United States) Joe Arlauckas	(Spain) Real Madrid	63	1995–96	(Italy) Virtus Bologna	
5	(Socialist Federal Republic of Yugoslavia) Radivoj Korać	(Socialist Federal Republic of Yugoslavia) OKK Beograd	60	1964–65	(Spain) Real Madrid	
6	(Czechoslovakia) Jiří Zídek Sr.	(Czechoslovakia) Slavia VŠ Praha	56	1974–75	(Egypt) Al-Zamalek Cairo	
7	(Socialist Federal Republic of Yugoslavia) Dražen Dalipagić	(Socialist Federal Republic of Yugoslavia) Partizan Belgrade	55	1981–82	(Italy) Cantù	
8	(Italy) Dan Callandrillo	(England) Solent Stars Southampton	52	1984–85	(France) Limoges CSP	
9	(Greece) Nikos Galis	(Greece) Aris Thessaloniki	52	1986–87	(Belgium) Oostende	
10	(Greece) Nikos Galis	(Greece) Aris Thessaloniki	52	1989–90	(Poland) Lech Poznań	
11	(Socialist Federal Republic of Yugoslavia) Mirza Delibašić	(Socialist Federal Republic of Yugoslavia) Bosna	51	1979–80	(Socialist Federal Republic of Yugoslavia) Partizan Belgrade	
12	(United States) Tony Zeno	(Belgium) Racing Maes Pils Mechelen	51	1980–81	(Finland) Pantterit Helsinki	
13	(Socialist Federal Republic of Yugoslavia) Dražen Petrović	(Socialist Federal Republic of Yugoslavia) Cibona Zagreb	51	1985–86	(France) Limoges CSP	
14	(Socialist Federal Republic of Yugoslavia) Radivoj Korać	(Socialist Federal Republic of Yugoslavia) OKK Beograd	50	1963–64	(France) Paris UC	
15	(United States) Louis Dunbar	(Switzerland) SP Federale Lugano	50	1975–76	(Italy) Cantù	
16	(Switzerland) Dan Stockalper	(Switzerland) AS Viganello	50	1980–81	(Egypt) Al-Zamalek Cairo	
17	(Greece) Nikos Galis	(Greece) Aris Thessaloniki	50	1987–88	(Italy) Olimpia Milano	
18	(United States) Nigel Hayes-Davis	(Turkey) Fenerbahçe Basketball	50	2023-24	(Germany) Alba Berlin	

=== Players that scored between 47–49 points in a single EuroLeague game ===
Rank	Player	Team	Points	Season	Versus
18	(Mexico) Manuel Raga	(Switzerland) SP Federale Lugano	49	1975–76	(Israel) Maccabi Tel Aviv
19	(Poland) Edward Jurkiewicz	(Poland) Wybrzeże Gdańsk	49	1978–79	(Greece) Olympiacos Piraeus
20	(Socialist Federal Republic of Yugoslavia) Dražen Petrović	(Socialist Federal Republic of Yugoslavia) Cibona Zagreb	49	1985–86	(Spain) Real Madrid
21	(Greece) Nikos Galis	(Greece) Aris Thessaloniki	49	1987–88	(Netherlands) Nashua EBBC Den Bosch
22	(Israel) Doron Jamchi	(Israel) Maccabi Tel Aviv	49	1990–91	(France) Limoges CSP
23	(Turkey) Shane Larkin	(Turkey) Efes Istanbul	49	2019–20	(Germany) Bayern Munich
24	(Albania) Agim Fagu	(Albania) Partizani Tirana	48	1968–69	(Italy) Cantù
25	(Austria) Mike Maloy	(Austria) UBSC Wien	48	1976–77	(France) ASPO Tours
26	(Greece) Nikos Galis	(Greece) Aris Thessaloniki	48	1987–88	(Switzerland) Pully
27	(Greece) Nikos Galis	(Greece) Aris Thessaloniki	48	1989–90	(Italy) Olimpia Milano
28	(Mexico) Manuel Raga	(Switzerland) SP Federale Lugano	47	1976–77	(Portugal) Sporting CP Lisboa
29	(Socialist Federal Republic of Yugoslavia) Dražen Petrović	(Socialist Federal Republic of Yugoslavia) Zibona Zagreb	47	1985–86	(Italy) Olimpia Milano
30	(United States) Michael Young	(France) Limoges CSP	47	1993–94	(Italy) Benetton Treviso

=== Players that scored between 44–46 points in a single EuroLeague game ===
Rank	Player	Team	Points	Season	Versus
31	(Belgium) Jef Eygel	(Belgium) Antwerpse	46	1961–62	(Republic of Ireland) Celtic Belfast
32	(Israel) Tal Brody	(Israel) Maccabi Tel Aviv	46	1967–68	(Germany) MTV Gießen
33	(United States) Walter Szczerbiak	(Spain) Real Madrid	46	1977–78	(Sweden) Alvik
34	(Albania) Kastriot Mushi	(Albania) Partizani Tirana	46	1978–79	(Cyprus) AEL Limassol
35	(United States) Tony Zeno	(Belgium) Racing Maes Pils Mechelen	46	1980–81	(Poland) WKS Śląsk Wrocław
36	(Soviet Union) Valdemaras Chomičius	(Soviet Union) Žalgiris Kaunas	46	1986–87	(Israel) Maccabi Tel Aviv
37	(United States) Paul Thompson	(Netherlands) Nashua EBBC Den Bosch	46	1987–88	(Israel) Maccabi Tel Aviv
38	(Greece) Nikos Galis	(Greece) Aris Thessaloniki	46	1991–92	(Italy) Olimpia Milano
39	(Socialist Federal Republic of Yugoslavia) Ivo Daneu	(Socialist Federal Republic of Yugoslavia) AŠK Olimpija Ljubljana	45	1961–62	(Spain) Real Madrid
40	(Bulgaria) Temelaki Dimitrov	(Bulgaria) CSKA Sofia	45	1967–68	(Spain) Joventut Badalona
41	(United States) John Lesher	(Belgium) Lier BBC	45	1971–72	(Greece) Panathinaikos Athens
42	(United States) Dale Dover	(Portugal) FC Porto	45	1972–73	(Czechoslovakia) Slavia VŠ Praha
43	(United States) Walter Szczerbiak	(Spain) Real Madrid	45	1974–75	(Socialist Federal Republic of Yugoslavia) Zadar
44	(Poland) Edward Jurkiewicz	(Poland) Wybrzeże Gdańsk	45	1978–79	(Greece) Olympiacos Piraeus
45	(Socialist Federal Republic of Yugoslavia) Žarko Varajić	(Socialist Federal Republic of Yugoslavia) Bosna	45	1978–79	(Italy) Varese
46	(United States) Jim McMillian	(Italy) Virtus Bologna	45	1979–80	(Socialist Federal Republic of Yugoslavia) Partizan Belgrade
47	(United States) Robinson	(Scotland) Murray Edinburgh	45	1981–82	(Spain) Barcelona
48	(Greece) Nikos Galis	(Greece) Aris Thessaloniki	45	1983–84	(Germany) ASC 1846 Göttingen
49	(Greece) Nikos Galis	(Greece) Aris Thessaloniki	45	1987–88	(Spain) Barcelona
50	(Greece) Nikos Galis	(Greece) Aris Thessaloniki	45	1988–89	(Socialist Federal Republic of Yugoslavia) Split
51	(Greece) Nikos Galis	(Greece) Aris Thessaloniki	45	1989–90	(France) Limoges CSP
52	(Greece) Nikos Galis	(Greece) Aris Thessaloniki	45	1989–90	(Netherlands) BV Den Helder
53	(Turkey) Ömer Saybir	(Turkey) Galatasaray İstanbul	45	1990–91	(Albania) KB Vllaznia Shkodër
54	(Croatia) Velimir Perasović	(Croatia) Split	45	1991–92	(Croatia) Cibona Zagreb
55	(Croatia) Ivica Žurić	(Croatia) Cibona Zagreb	45	1993–94	(Italy) Virtus Bologna
56	(Portugal) Carlos Lisboa	(Portugal) SL Benfica	45	1995–96	(Federal Republic of Yugoslavia) Partizan Belgrade
57	(Bulgaria) Sasha Vezenkov	(Greece) Olympiacos	45	2024–25	(Germany) Bayern Munich
58	(Czechoslovakia) Jiří Zídek Sr.	(Czechoslovakia) Slavia VŠ Praha	44	1965–66	(Belgium) Racing Mechelen
59	(Czechoslovakia) Jiří Zídek Sr.	(Czechoslovakia) Slavia VŠ Praha	44	1966–67	(Bulgaria) Lokomotiv Sofia
60	(Socialist Federal Republic of Yugoslavia) Krešimir Ćosić	(Socialist Federal Republic of Yugoslavia) Zadar	44	1968–69	(Bulgaria) Akademik Sofia
61	(United States) Walter Szczerbiak	(Spain) Real Madrid	44	1973–74	(Bulgaria) Akademik Sofia
62	(United States) Bob Morse	(Italy) Varese	44	1974–75	(Socialist Federal Republic of Yugoslavia) Zadar
63	(United States) John Coughran	(Spain) Real Madrid	44	1975–76	(Netherlands) RZ Rotterdam
64	(United States) Walter Szczerbiak	(Spain) Real Madrid	44	1976–77	(Switzerland) SP Federale Lugano
65	(Socialist Federal Republic of Yugoslavia) Dražen Dalipagić	(Socialist Federal Republic of Yugoslavia) Partizan Belgrade	44	1976–77	(Czechoslovakia) Spartak-Zbrojovka Brno
66	(Socialist Federal Republic of Yugoslavia) Petar Vilfan	(Socialist Federal Republic of Yugoslavia) Split	44	1977–78	(Israel) Maaccabi Tel Aviv
67	(United States) Walter Szczerbiak	(Spain) Real Madrid	44	1977–78	(Sweden) Alvik
68	(United States) Dave Burns	(Luxembourg) BBC Amicale	44	1978–79	(Portugal) Sporting CP Lisboa
69	(Socialist Federal Republic of Yugoslavia) Mirza Delibašić	(Socialist Federal Republic of Yugoslavia) Bosna	44	1979–80	(Spain) Real Madrid
70	(Socialist Federal Republic of Yugoslavia) Dražen Petrović	(Socialist Federal Republic of Yugoslavia) Cibona Zagreb	44	1984–85	(Spain) Real Madrid
71	(Socialist Federal Republic of Yugoslavia) Dražen Petrović	(Socialist Federal Republic of Yugoslavia) Cibona Zagreb	44	1985–86	(Israel) Maccabi Tel Aviv
72	(Greece) Nikos Galis	(Greece) Aris Thessaloniki	44	1986–87	(Italy) Olimpia Milano
73	(Greece) Nikos Galis	(Greece) Aris Thessaloniki	44	1987–88	(Israel) Maccabi Tel Aviv
74	(Greece) Nikos Galis	(Greece) Aris Thessaloniki	44	1988–89	(Netherlands) Nashua EBBC Den Bosch
75	(United States) David Brown	(Switzerland) Pully	44	1990–91	(Israel) Maccabi Tel Aviv
76	(Czechoslovakia) Josef Jelínek	(Czechoslovakia) TJ Zbrojovka Brno	44	1990–91	(Sweden) Södertälje
77	(Greece) Nikos Galis	(Greece) Aris Thessaloniki	44	1991–92	(Spain) Joventut Badalona
78	(Greece) Nikos Galis	(Greece) Aris Thessaloniki	44	1991–92	(Netherlands) BV Den Helder

=== Players that scored between 40–43 points in a single EuroLeague game ===
Rank	Player	Team	Points	Season	Versus
78	(United States) Wayne Hightower	(Spain) Real Madrid	43	1961–62	(Morocco) Casablancais
79	(Italy) Paolo Vittori	(Italy) Olimpia Milano	43	1963–64	(Belgium) Antwerpse
80	(United States) Joby Wright	(France) AS Berck	43	1974–75	(Sweden) Alviks
81	(United States) Lewis Young	(Scotland) Murray Edinburgh	43	1980–81	(Sweden) Hageby Norrköping
82	(United States) Billy Lewis	(Turkey) Efes İstanbul	43	1983–84	(Spain) Barcelona
83	(United States) Bob McAdoo	(Italy) Olimpia Milano	43	1987–88	(Germany) BSC Saturn Köln
84	(United States) David Brown	(Switzerland) Pully	43	1989–90	(France) Limoges CSP
85	(Greece) Nikos Galis	(Greece) Aris Thessaloniki	43	1989–90	(Netherlands) BV Den Helder
86	(Greece) Nikos Galis	(Greece) Aris Thessaloniki	43	1989–90	(France) Limoges CSP
87	(United States) Tony Dawson	(Germany) Bayer Leverkusen	43	1996–97	(Italy) Kinder Bologna
88	(United States) Kevin Punter	(Spain) Barcelona	43	2025–26	(Spain) Baskonia
89	(Belgium) René Aerts	(Belgium) Antwerpse	42	1961–62	(Republic of Ireland) Celtic Belfast
90	(Italy) Tony Gennari	(Italy) Varese	42	1964–65	(Czechoslovakia) Spartak ZJŠ Brno
91	(Socialist Federal Republic of Yugoslavia) Radivoj Korać	(Socialist Federal Republic of Yugoslavia) OKK Beograd	42	1964–65	(Greece) AEK Athens
92	(Greece) Georgios Amerikanos	(Greece) AEK Athens	42	1965–66	(Morocco) Wydad AC
93	(Belgium) Willy Steveniers	(Belgium) Racing Mechelen	42	1965–66	(Italy) Olimpia Milano
94	(United States) Bill Bradley	(Italy) Olimpia Milano	42	1965–66	(Belgium) Racing Mechelen
95	(Socialist Federal Republic of Yugoslavia) Ivo Daneu	(Socialist Federal Republic of Yugoslavia) AŠK Olimpija Ljubljana	42	1966–67	(Belgium) Racing Mechelen
96	(Czechoslovakia) František Konvička	(Czechoslovakia) Spartak ZJŠ Brno	42	1968–69	(Belgium) Standard Liège
97	(United States) Walter Szczerbiak	(Spain) Real Madrid	42	1974–75	(Netherlands) RZ Rotterdam
98	(United States) Roger Morningstar	(Netherlands) RZ Rotterdam	42	1975–76	(England) Embassy All-Stars
99	(Socialist Federal Republic of Yugoslavia) Čedomir Perinčić	(Socialist Federal Republic of Yugoslavia) Zadar	42	1975–76	(Italy) Varese
100	(Czechoslovakia) Kamil Brabenec	(Czechoslovakia) Zbrojovka Brno	42	1977–78	(Austria) UBSC Wien
101	(United States) Ron Haigler	(Turkey) Eczacıbaşı SK İstanbul	42	1980–81	(Italy) Virtus Bologna
102	(Greece) Nikos Galis	(Greece) Aris Thessaloniki	42	1985–86	(Germany) Bayer 04 Leverkusen
103	(United States) Wayne Robinson	(Spain) Real Madrid	42	1985–86	(Israel) Maccabi Tel Aviv
104	(United States) Billy Knight	(France) Limoges CSP	42	1985–86	(Socialist Federal Republic of Yugoslavia) Cibona Zagreb
105	(United States) Paul Thompson	(Netherlands) Nashua EBBC Den Bosch	42	1987–88	(Italy) Olimpia Milano
106	(Germany) Mike Jäckel	(Germany) BSC Saturn Köln	42	1987–88	(Netherlands) Nashua EBBC Den Bosch
107	(United States) Bob McAdoo	(Italy) Olimpia Milano	42	1989–90	(Israel) Maccabi Tel Aviv
108	(Croatia) Zdravko Radulović	(Croatia) Cibona Zagreb	42	1991–92	(France) Olympique d'Antibes
109	(Croatia) Zdravko Radulović	(Croatia) Cibona Zagreb	42	1991–92	(Croatia) Split
110	(Socialist Federal Republic of Yugoslavia) Radivoj Korać	(Socialist Federal Republic of Yugoslavia) OKK Beograd	41	1958–59	(Bulgaria) Akademik Sofia
111	(Turkey) Nedret Uyguç	(Turkey) Darüşşafaka İstanbul	41	1962–63	(Hungary) Budapesti Honvéd SE
112	(Spain) Clifford Luyk	(Spain) Real Madrid	41	1964–65	(Finland) Helsingin Kisa-Toverit
113	(United States) Walter Szczerbiak	(Spain) Real Madrid	41	1974–75	(Israel) Maccabi Tel Aviv
114	(Spain) Wayne Brabender	(Spain) Real Madrid	41	1974–75	(Socialist Federal Republic of Yugoslavia) Zadar
115	(Bulgaria) Atanas Golomeev	(Bulgaria) Akademik Sofia	41	1975–76	(Socialist Federal Republic of Yugoslavia) Zadar
116	(Italy) Bob Lienhard	(Italy) Cantù	41	1975–76	(Israel) Maccabi Tel Aviv
117	(United States) Stew Johnson	(Switzerland) SP Federale Lugano	41	1976–77	(England) Crystal Palace
118	(Czechoslovakia) Kamil Brabenec	(Czechoslovakia) Zbrojovka Brno	41	1977–78	(Sweden) Alvik
119	(United States) John Fultz	(Austria) UBSC Wien	41	1977–78	(Czechoslovakia) Zbrojovka Brno
120	(Socialist Federal Republic of Yugoslavia) Žarko Varajić	(Socialist Federal Republic of Yugoslavia) Bosna	41	1978–79	(Israel) Maccabi Tel Aviv
121	(Socialist Federal Republic of Yugoslavia) Mirza Delibašić	(Socialist Federal Republic of Yugoslavia) Bosna	41	1978–79	(Spain) Joventut Badalona
122	(Italy) Renato Villalta	(Italy) Virtus Bologna	41	1980–81	(Turkey) Eczacıbaşı İstanbul
123	(United States) Ed Murphy	(France) Limoges CSP	41	1983–84	(Netherlands) Nashua EBBC Den Bosch
124	(Israel) Miki Berkovich	(Israel) Maccabi Tel Aviv	41	1983–84	(France) Limoges CSP
125	(United States) Ed Murphy	(France) Limoges CSP	41	1983–84	(Israel) Maccabi Tel Aviv
126	(United States) Ed Murphy	(France) Limoges CSP	41	1983–84	(Socialist Federal Republic of Yugoslavia) Bosna
127	(United States) Ed Murphy	(France) Limoges CSP	41	1983–84	(Italy) Cantù
128	(United States) Ed Murphy	(France) Limoges CSP	41	1984–85	(England) Solent Stars Southampton
129	(United States) Steve Bontrager	(England) Kingston London	41	1985–86	(Israel) Maccabi Tel Aviv
130	(Socialist Federal Republic of Yugoslavia) Dražen Petrović	(Socialist Federal Republic of Yugoslavia) Cibona Zagreb	41	1985–86	(Israel) Maccabi Tel Aviv
131	(United States) Lee Johnson	(Israel) Maccabi Tel Aviv	41	1985–86	(Spain) Real Madrid
132	(Socialist Federal Republic of Yugoslavia) Dražen Petrović	(Socialist Federal Republic of Yugoslavia) Cibona Zagreb	41	1985–86	(Spain) Real Madrid
133	(United States) Vince Reynolds	(Switzerland) Pully	41	1986–87	(Israel) Maccabi Tel Aviv
134	(United States) Alvin "Bo" Dukes	(Sweden) Södertälje	41	1987–88	(Belgium) Racing Maes Pils Mechelen
135	(Greece) Nikos Galis	(Greece) Aris Thessaloniki	41	1987–88	(Switzerland) Pully
136	(Socialist Federal Republic of Yugoslavia) Žarko Paspalj	(Socialist Federal Republic of Yugoslavia) Partizan Belgrade	41	1987–88	(Netherlands) Nashua EBBC Den Bosch
137	(Socialist Federal Republic of Yugoslavia) Goran Grbović	(Socialist Federal Republic of Yugoslavia) Partizan Belgrade	41	1987–88	(Netherlands) Nashua EBBC Den Bosch
138	(Netherlands) Jos Kuipers	(Netherlands) Nashua EBBC Den Bosch	41	1987–88	(France) EB Pau-Orthez
139	(Iceland) Guðjón Skúlason	(Iceland) Keflavík	41	1989–90	(England) Bracknell Tigers
140	(Greece) Nikos Galis	(Greece) Aris Thessaloniki	41	1990–91	(Germany) TSV Bayer 04 Leverkusen
141	(United States) Mike Vreeswyk	(Netherlands) Den Bosch	41	1993–94	(Poland) Śląsk Wrocław
142	(United States) Buck Johnson	(Israel) Hapoel Tel Aviv	41	1994–95	(Greece) PAOK
143	(Turkey) İbrahim Kutluay	(Turkey) Fenerbahçe	41	1998–99	(Croatia) Cibona Zagreb
144	(United States) Alphonso Ford	(Greece) Peristeri	41	2000–01	(Spain) Tau Ceramica
145	(Italy) Carlton Myers	(Italy) Fortitudo Bologna	41	2000–01	(Spain) Real Madrid
146	(Latvia) Kaspars Kambala	(Turkey) Efes Pilsen	41	2002–03	(Spain) FC Barcelona
147	(United States) Bobby Brown	(Italy) Montepaschi Siena	41	2012–13	(Turkey) Fenerbahçe
148	(Montenegro) Tyrese Rice	(Greece) Panathinaikos	41	2019–20	(Greece) Olympiacos
149	(Poland) Bohdan Likszo	(Poland) Wisła Kraków	40	1962–63	(Soviet Union) CSKA Moscow
150	(Czechoslovakia) Jiří Zídek Sr.	(Czechoslovakia) Slavia VŠ Praha	40	1965–66	(Belgium) Racing Mechelen
151	(Italy) Gabriele Vianello	(Italy) Olimpia Milano	40	1965–66	(Spain) Real Madrid
152	(Italy) Massimo Masini	(Italy) Olimpia Milano	40	1966–67	(Socialist Federal Republic of Yugoslavia) AŠK Olimpija Ljubljana
153	(Socialist Federal Republic of Yugoslavia) Dragan Kapičić	(Socialist Federal Republic of Yugoslavia) Red Star Belgrade	40	1972–73	(Israel) Maccabi Tel Aviv
154	(Poland) Edward Jurkiewicz	(Poland) Wybrzeże Gdańsk	40	1973–74	(Greece) Panathinaikos Athens
155	(United States) Bob Morse	(Italy) Varese	40	1977–78	(Sweden) Alvik
156	(Poland) Edward Jurkiewicz	(Poland) Wybrzeże Gdańsk	40	1978–79	(Syria) Jalaa Aleppo
157	(Israel) Miki Berkovich	(Israel) Maccabi Tel Aviv	40	1979–80	(Italy) Virtus Bologna
158	(Czechoslovakia) Stano Kropilák	(Czechoslovakia) Inter Slovnaft Bratislava	40	1980–81	(Sweden) Hageby Norrköping
159	(United States) Billy Ray Bates	(Switzerland) Fribourg Olympic	40	1985–86	(Hungary) Budapesti Honvéd
160	(United States) Billy Ray Bates	(Switzerland) Fribourg Olympic	40	1985–86	(Spain) Real Madrid
161	(United States) Kevin Magee	(Israel) Maccabi Tel Aviv	40	1985–86	(France) Limoges CSP
162	(Socialist Federal Republic of Yugoslavia) Dražen Petrović	(Socialist Federal Republic of Yugoslavia) Cibona Zagreb	40	1985–86	(Soviet Union) Žalgiris Kaunas
163	(Greece) Nikos Galis	(Greece) Aris Thessaloniki	40	1989–90	(Bulgaria) Balkan Botevgrad
164	(Sweden) Bill Magarity	(Sweden) Södertälje	40	1990–91	(Israel) Maccabi Tel Aviv
165	(Socialist Federal Republic of Yugoslavia) Toni Kukoč	(Socialist Federal Republic of Yugoslavia) Split	40	1990–91	(Italy) U.S. Victoria Libertas Pesaro
166	(Greece) Nikos Galis	(Greece) Aris Thessaloniki	40	1990–91	(France) Limoges CSP
167	(Greece) Nikos Galis	(Greece) Aris Thessaloniki	40	1991–92	(Spain) Estudiantes
168	(Croatia) Zdravko Radulović	(Croatia) Cibona Zagreb	40	1991–92	(Italy) Phonola Caserta
169	(Croatia) Arijan Komazec	(Italy) Virtus Bologna	40	1996–97	(Spain) FC Barcelona
170	(Croatia) Zdravko Radulović	(Croatia) Cibona Zagreb	40	1992–93	(Finland) NMKY Helsinki
171	(United States) Tony Dawson	(Germany) TSV Bayer 04	40	1995–96	(Ukraine) Budivelnyk Kyiv
172	(Federal Republic of Yugoslavia) Vlado Šćepanović	(Federal Republic of Yugoslavia) Partizan	40	2001–02	(Russia) Ural Great
173	(Lithuania) Arvydas Macijauskas	(Spain) Tau Ceramica	40	2002–03	(France) ASVEL Basket
174	(United States) Marc Salyers	(France) Chorale Roanne	40	2007–08	(Turkey) Fenerbahçe
175	(Turkey) Shane Larkin	(Turkey) Anadolu Efes	40	2019–20	(Greece) Olympiacos
176	(Bosnia and Herzegovina) Džanan Musa	(Spain) Real Madrid	40	2023–24	(Turkey) Anadolu Efes
