= Basketball at the 1988 Summer Olympics – Men's tournament =

Tournament details
- Host country: South Korea
- City: Seoul
- Dates: 17–30 September 1988
- Teams: 12 (from 5 confederations)
- Venue: 1

Final positions
- Champions: Soviet Union (2nd title)
- Runners-up: Yugoslavia
- Third place: United States
- Fourth place: Australia

Tournament statistics
- Games played: 46
- Top scorer: (Brazil) Oscar Schmidt (42.3 points per game)

The men's tournament in basketball at the 1988 Summer Olympics in Seoul began on 17 September and ended on 30 September.

The Soviet Union won its second gold medal, defeating Yugoslavia 76–63 in the gold medal match.

This was the last Olympic basketball tournament where NBA players were not allowed to participate; FIBA instituted a rule change in 1989 that lifted that restriction, leading to the dominance of 1992's Dream Team.

== Competition schedule ==
G	Group stage	¼	Quarter-finals	½	Semi-finals	C	Classification matches	B	Bronze medal match	F	Final

Sat 17	Sun 18	Mon 19	Tue 20	Wed 21	Thu 22	Fri 23	Sat 24	Sun 25	Mon 26		Tue 27	Wed 28		Thu 29		Fri 30	
G	G		G	G		G	G		C	¼		C	½	C	B	C	F

== Qualification ==
A NOC could enter one men's team with 12 players. Automatic qualifications were granted to the host country and the winners from the previous edition. The remaining teams were decided by the continental championships in Asia, Oceania, Africa and Americas and European qualifying tournament. Champions of Asia and Oceania, top two teams from Africa and top three from Americas earned direct qualification. Last three berths are allocated from European qualifying tournament, held in Netherlands.

Means of qualification	Date	Venue	Berths	Qualified
1984 Summer Olympics	29 July – 10 August 1984	(United States) Los Angeles	1	United States
Host nation	30 September 1981	(West Germany) Baden-Baden	1	South Korea
1987 FIBA Oceania Championship	31 August – 4 September 1987	(New Zealand) Timaru (New Zealand) Christchurch	1	Australia
FIBA Africa Championship 1987	17–27 December 1987	(Tunisia) Tunis	2	Central African Republic
FIBA Africa Championship 1987	17–27 December 1987	(Tunisia) Tunis	2	Egypt
1988 Tournament of the Americas	22–31 May 1988	(Uruguay) Montevideo	3	Brazil
1988 Tournament of the Americas	22–31 May 1988	(Uruguay) Montevideo	3	Puerto Rico
1988 Tournament of the Americas	22–31 May 1988	(Uruguay) Montevideo	3	Canada
European qualifying tournament	July 1988	Netherlands	3	Soviet Union
European qualifying tournament	July 1988	Netherlands	3	Yugoslavia
European qualifying tournament	July 1988	Netherlands	3	Spain
1987 ABC Championship	14–27 November 1987	(Thailand) Bangkok	1	China
Total			12	

== Squads ==
Each NOC was limited to one team per tournament. Each team had a roster of twelve players.

== Group stage ==
=== Group A ===
Pos	Team	Pld	W	L	PF	PA	PD	Pts	Qualification
1	Yugoslavia	5	4	1	468	384	+84	9 (Note: Head-to-head record: Yugoslavia 1–0 Soviet Union)	Quarterfinals
2	Soviet Union	5	4	1	460	393	+67	9	Quarterfinals
3	Australia	5	3	2	429	408	+21	8 (Note: Head-to-head record: Australia 1–0 Puerto Rico)	Quarterfinals
4	Puerto Rico	5	3	2	382	387	−5	8	Quarterfinals
5	Central African Republic	5	1	4	346	436	−90	6	9th–12th classification round
6	South Korea (H)	5	0	5	384	461	−77	5	9th–12th classification round

Source: FIBA archive
Rules for classification: 1) points; 2) head-to-head points; 3) head-to-head goal average; 4) head-to-head number of points scored.
(H) Hosts
Notes:

18 September 1988

Australia	81–77	Puerto Rico
Scoring by half: 50–36, 31–41

Jamsil Gymnasium, Seoul

18 September 1988

Central African Republic	73–70	South Korea
Scoring by half: 47–30, 26–40

Jamsil Gymnasium, Seoul

18 September 1988

Soviet Union	79–92	Yugoslavia
Scoring by half: 33–39, 46–53

Jamsil Gymnasium, Seoul

20 September 1988

South Korea	74–79	Puerto Rico
Scoring by half: 30–38, 44–41

Jamsil Gymnasium, Seoul

20 September 1988

Central African Republic	61–102	Yugoslavia
Scoring by half: 21–51, 40–51

Jamsil Gymnasium, Seoul

20 September 1988

Australia	69–91	Soviet Union
Scoring by half: 35–53, 34–38

Jamsil Gymnasium, Seoul

21 September 1988

South Korea	92–104	Yugoslavia
Scoring by half: 46–48, 46–56

Jamsil Gymnasium, Seoul

21 September 1988

Puerto Rico	81–93 (OT)	Soviet Union
Scoring by half: 39–37, 37–39 Overtime: 5–17

Jamsil Gymnasium, Seoul

21 September 1988

Australia	106–67	Central African Republic
Scoring by half: 57–35, 49–32

Jamsil Gymnasium, Seoul

23 September 1988

Central African Republic	67–71	Puerto Rico
Scoring by half: 41–27, 26–34

Jamsil Gymnasium, Seoul

23 September 1988

South Korea	73–110	Soviet Union
Scoring by half: 38–59, 35–51

Jamsil Gymnasium, Seoul

23 September 1988

Australia	78–98	Yugoslavia
Scoring by half: 43–52, 35–46

Jamsil Gymnasium, Seoul

24 September 1988

Australia	95–75	South Korea
Scoring by half: 51–39, 44–36

Jamsil Gymnasium, Seoul

24 September 1988

Central African Republic	78–87	Soviet Union
Scoring by half: 31–40, 47–47

Jamsil Gymnasium, Seoul

24 September 1988

Puerto Rico	74–72	Yugoslavia
Scoring by half: 36–37, 38–35

Jamsil Gymnasium, Seoul

=== Group B ===
Pos	Team	Pld	W	L	PF	PA	PD	Pts	Qualification
1	United States	5	5	0	485	302	+183	10	Quarterfinals
2	Spain	5	4	1	484	435	+49	9	Quarterfinals
3	Brazil	5	3	2	590	522	+68	8	Quarterfinals
4	Canada	5	2	3	479	455	+24	7	Quarterfinals
5	China	5	1	4	433	527	−94	6	9th–12th classification round
6	Egypt	5	0	5	338	568	−230	5	9th–12th classification round

Source: FIBA archive
Rules for classification: 1) points; 2) head-to-head points; 3) head-to-head goal average; 4) head-to-head number of points scored.

17 September 1988

China	98–84	Egypt
Scoring by half: 47–43, 51–41

Jamsil Gymnasium, Seoul

17 September 1988

Brazil	125–109	Canada
Scoring by half: 56–45, 69–64

Jamsil Gymnasium, Seoul

18 September 1988

Spain	53–97	United States
Scoring by half: 32–48, 21–49

Jamsil Gymnasium, Seoul

20 September 1988

Brazil	130–108	China
Scoring by half: 72–61, 58–47

Jamsil Gymnasium, Seoul

20 September 1988

Canada	70–76	United States
Scoring by half: 42–40, 28–36

Jamsil Gymnasium, Seoul

20 September 1988

Egypt	70–113	Spain
Scoring by half: 44–57, 26–56

Jamsil Gymnasium, Seoul

21 September 1988

Brazil	87–102	United States
Scoring by half: 55–63, 32–39

Jamsil Gymnasium, Seoul

21 September 1988

Canada	117–64	Egypt
Scoring by half: 61–32, 56–32

Jamsil Gymnasium, Seoul

21 September 1988

China	74–106	Spain
Scoring by half: 43–59, 31–57

Jamsil Gymnasium, Seoul

23 September 1988

Canada	84–94	Spain
Scoring by half: 51–45, 33–49

Jamsil Gymnasium, Seoul

23 September 1988

Brazil	138–85	Egypt
Scoring by half: 66–38, 72–47

Jamsil Gymnasium, Seoul

23 September 1988

China	57–108	United States
Scoring by half: 26–59, 31–49

Jamsil Gymnasium, Seoul

24 September 1988

Canada	99–96	China
Scoring by half: 56–52, 43–44

Jamsil Gymnasium, Seoul

24 September 1988

Egypt	35–102	United States
Scoring by half: 21–62, 14–40

Jamsil Gymnasium, Seoul

24 September 1988

Brazil	110–118	Spain
Scoring by half: 57–61, 53–57

Jamsil Gymnasium, Seoul

== Knockout stage ==
=== Championship bracket ===
Quarter-finals
September 26
(A1) Yugoslavia	95
(B4) Canada	73
September 26
(B2) Spain	74
(A3) Australia	77
September 26
(B1) United States	94
(A4) Puerto Rico	57
September 26
(A2) Soviet Union	110
(B3) Brazil	105

Semi-finals
September 28
(A1) Yugoslavia	91
(A3) Australia	70
September 28
(B1) United States	76
(A2) Soviet Union	82

Gold medal match
September 30
(A1) Yugoslavia	63
(A2) Soviet Union	76
Third place
September 29
(A3) Australia	49
(B1) United States	78

=== Quarterfinals ===
26 September 1988
21:30

Boxscore

Yugoslavia	95–73	Canada
Scoring by half: 40–26, 55–47
Pts: Divac 17; Rebs: Vranković 9 Asts: Cvjetićanin, Divac, Petrović 2		Pts: Walton 17; Rebs: Mungar, Walton 7 Asts: Hatch 2

Jamsil Gymnasium, Seoul

26 September 1988
16:30

Boxscore

Spain	74–77	Australia
Scoring by half: 40–41, 34–36
Pts: San Epifanio 17; Rebs: Martínez, Jiménez 7 Asts: Montero 3		Pts: Gaze 28; Rebs: Sengstock 5 Asts: 4 players 1

Jamsil Gymnasium, Seoul

26 September 1988
11:45

Boxscore

United States	94–57	Puerto Rico
Scoring by half: 48–28, 46–29
Pts: Manning 18; Rebs: Manning 7 Asts: C.D. Smith 3		Pts: Cruz 12; Rebs: Mincy 8 Asts: Cruz 4

Jamsil Gymnasium, Seoul

26 September 1988
19:30

Boxscore

Soviet Union	110–105	Brazil
Scoring by half: 53–58, 57–47
Pts: Kurtinaitis 24; Rebs: Sabonis 9 Asts: Sabonis, Tarakanov, Volkov 2		Pts: Schmidt 46; Rebs: Israel 11; Asts: Maury 5

Jamsil Gymnasium, Seoul

=== Semifinals ===
28 September 1988

Boxscore

Yugoslavia	91–70	Australia
Scoring by half: 44–31, 47–39
Pts: Petrović 24; Rebs: Divac 10; Asts: Petrović 3		Pts: Gaze 27; Rebs: Borner, Vlahov 4 Asts: Sengstock 4

Jamsil Gymnasium, Seoul

28 September 1988
12:00

Boxscore

United States	76–82	Soviet Union
Scoring by half: 37–47, 39–35
Pts: Robinson 19; Rebs: Robinson 12; Asts: Coles 2		Pts: Kurtinaitis 28; Rebs: Sabonis 13; Asts: Volkov 5

Jamsil Gymnasium, Seoul

=== Bronze medal game ===
29 September 1988
21:30

Boxscore

Australia	49–78	United States
Scoring by half: 29–52, 20–26
Pts: Gaze 17; Rebs: Sengstock 6 Asts: Smyth 2		Pts: Majerle, Richmond, Robinson 12; Rebs: Richmond, Robinson 7 Asts: Richmond 2

Jamsil Gymnasium, Seoul

=== Gold medal game ===
30 September 1988

Boxscore

Yugoslavia	63–76	Soviet Union
Scoring by half: 28–31, 35–45
Pts: Petrović 24; Rebs: Divac 7 Asts: Petrović 4		Pts: Marčiulionis 21; Rebs: Sabonis 15; Asts: Marčiulionis 6

Jamsil Gymnasium, Seoul

=== Classification round ===
5th–8th Place

September 28
B3	Brazil	104
A4	Puerto Rico	86
B4	Canada	96
B2	Spain	91

5th place (September 30)
B3	Brazil	106
B4	Canada	90
7th place (September 29)
A4	Puerto Rico	93
B2	Spain	92

9th–12th Place

September 26
A5	Central Afr. Rep.	63
B6	Egypt	57
B5	China	90
A6	South Korea	93

9th place (September 29)
A5	Central Afr. Rep.	81
A6	South Korea	89
11th place (September 29)
B6	Egypt	75
B5	China	97

Classification 5–8 semifinals

28 September 1988
9:45

Boxscore

Brazil	104–86	Puerto Rico
Scoring by half: 51–39, 53–47
Pts: Schmidt 46; Rebs: Schmidt 9 Asts: Guerrinha 7		Pts: E. de León 19; Rebs: E. de León 10; Asts: Cruz 2

Jamsil Gymnasium, Seoul

28 September 1988
14:30

Boxscore

Canada	96–91	Spain
Scoring by half: 41–42, 55–49
Pts: Triano 27; Rebs: Raffin 8 Asts: Raffin 4		Pts: Jiménez 16; Rebs: Jiménez 6 Asts: Solozábal 5

Jamsil Gymnasium, Seoul

Classification 7–8

29 September 1988
19:30

Boxscore

Puerto Rico	93–92	Spain
Scoring by half: 47–45, 46–47
Pts: Morales 25; Rebs: Ortíz, Mincy 8 Asts: Ortíz 4		Pts: Jiménez 31; Rebs: Jiménez 8 Asts: Solozábal 6

Jamsil Gymnasium, Seoul

Classification 5–6

30 September 1988
09:45

Boxscore

Brazil	106–90	Canada
Scoring by half: 43–39, 63–51
Pts: Schmidt 41; Rebs: Pipoka 17; Asts: Villas Boas, Schmidt 2		Pts: Triano 29; Rebs: Hatch 10; Asts: Yearwood 3

Jamsil Gymnasium, Seoul

Classification 9–12 semifinals

26 September 1988
09:45

Boxscore

Central African Republic	63–57	Egypt
Scoring by half: 33–31, 30–26
Pts: F. Goporo, Bella 15; Rebs: Lavodrama 16; Asts: Lavodrama 7		Pts: Khalil 17; Rebs: Khalil 8 Asts: Amir 4

Jamsil Gymnasium, Seoul

26 September 1988
09:45

Boxscore

China	90–93	South Korea
Scoring by half: 48–47, 42–46
Pts: Li 22; Rebs: Wang L. 7 Asts: Li 2		Pts: Kim HJ 17; Rebs: Kim YT 12; Asts: Kim HJ, Kim YT, Yoo 2

Jamsil Gymnasium, Seoul

Classification 11–12

29 September 1988
14:30

Boxscore

Egypt	75–97	China
Scoring by half: 42–56, 33–41
Pts: Khalil 26; Rebs: Moussa 6 Asts: Moussa, Sedky 1		Pts: Zhang Y. 33; Rebs: Song 12; Asts: Sun, Wang L., Zhang Y. 3

Jamsil Gymnasium, Seoul

Classification 9–10

29 September 1988
16:30

Boxscore

Central African Republic	81–89	South Korea
Scoring by half: 41–43, 40–46
Pts: Lavodrama 14; Rebs: Lavodrama 12; Asts: Kotta 3		Pts: Lee CH 31; Rebs: Lee MK 8 Asts: Kim HJ 6

Jamsil Gymnasium, Seoul

== Awards ==
1988 Olympic Basketball Champions

Soviet Union
Second title

== Final ranking ==
Rankings are determined by classification games:

Rank	Team	Pld	W	L	PF	PA	PD
Gold medal game participants
1st place, gold medalist(s)	Soviet Union	8	7	1	728	637	+91
2nd place, silver medalist(s)	Yugoslavia	8	6	2	717	603	+114
Bronze medal game participants
3rd place, bronze medalist(s)	United States	8	7	1	733	490	+243
4th	Australia	8	4	4	625	651	−26
Eliminated at the quarterfinals
5th	Brazil	8	5	3	905	808	+97
6th	Canada	8	3	5	738	747	−9
7th	Puerto Rico	8	4	4	618	677	−59
8th	Spain	8	4	4	741	701	+40
Eliminated at the preliminary round
9th	South Korea	7	2	5	566	632	−66
10th	Central African Republic	7	2	5	490	582	−92
11th	China	7	2	5	620	695	−75
12th	Egypt	7	0	7	470	728	−258
