= Zdravko Radulović =

Croatian basketball player and coach (born 1966)

Personal information
- Born: December 12, 1966 (age 59) Nikšić, SR Montenegro, SFR Yugoslavia
- Listed height: 1.91 m (6 ft 3 in)
- Listed weight: 84 kg (185 lb)

Career information
- Playing career: 1984–2002
- Position: Shooting guard
- Coaching career: 2006–2021

Career history

Playing
- 1984–1990: Bosna
- 1990–1993: Cibona
- 1993–1994: Aris
- 1994–1995: Zrinjevac
- 1995–1996: Smelt Olmpija
- 1996–1998: Cibona
- 1998: Muratpasa Belediye
- 1998–1999: Maccabi Tel Aviv
- 1999–2001: Czarni Słupsk
- 2001–2002: Arkadia Traiskirchen Lions

Coaching
- 2006–2007: Zagreb
- 2007–2009: Cedevita
- 2010: Cibona
- 2017–2018: Rimini Crabs (Under-20)
- 2017–2018: Bellaria Basket
- 2020–2021: Samobor
- 2021: Zabok

Career highlights
- As a player: FIBA EuroLeague Top Scorer (1993); Israeli Premiere League champion (1999); Israeli State Cup winner (1999); 4× Croatian League champion (1992, 1993, 1997, 1998); Croatian League All-Star (1995); Croatian League All-Star Game MVP (1995); Slovenian League champion (1996)
Medals
Men's Basketball
Representing Yugoslavia
Summer Olympic Games
Silver medal – second place	1988 Seoul
FIBA EuroBasket
Gold medal – first place	1989 Yugoslavia
Universiade
Gold medal – first place	1987 Zagreb

Zdravko Radulović (born December 12, 1966) is a Croatian former professional basketball player and coach. During his professional club playing career, at a height of 1.91 m (6 ft 3 in) tall, he played at the shooting guard position.

== Club career ==
Radulović, who was born in Nikšić, SR Montenegro, SFR Yugoslavia, was a very prolific scorer. He avergaded 24.4 points per game in the FIBA EuroLeague's 1991–92 season. He was then the FIBA EuroLeague Top Scorer, during the following FIBA EuroLeague 1992–93 season, with a scoring average of 23.9 points per game.

== National team career ==
Radulović was a member of the senior men's Yugoslav national team. With Yugoslavia, after playing at the 1988 FIBA European Olympic Qualifying Tournament, Radulović won the silver medal at the 1988 Seoul Summer Olympic Games. With Yugoslavia, he also won the gold medal at the 1989 FIBA EuroBasket.

== Coaching career ==
After his playing career ended, Radulović became a basketball coach. He became the head coach of the Croatian pro club basketball team Cedevita, in November 2007. He followed that up by coaching Zagreb, and then Cibona.
