= 1992–93 FIBA European League =

- League: FIBA European League
- Sport: Basketball

Regular Season
- Top scorer: (Croatia) Zdravko Radulović (Cibona)

Final Four
- Champions: (France) Limoges CSP (1st title)
- Runners-up: (Italy) Benetton Treviso
- Final Four MVP: (Croatia) Toni Kukoč (Benetton Treviso)

FIBA European League seasons
- ← 1991–92 1993–94 →

The 1992–93 FIBA European League, also shortened to 1992–93 FIBA EuroLeague, was the 36th season of the European top-tier level professional club competition for basketball clubs (now called EuroLeague). It featured 42 competing teams from 33 countries. The final of the competition was held on April 15, 1993, at the Peace and Friendship Stadium in Piraeus, Greece, with Limoges CSP defeating Benetton Treviso, by a score of 59–55. The defending title holder, Partizan, was not allowed in the competition because of United Nations Security Council Resolution 757, which imposed sanctions against Yugoslavia.

== Competition system ==
- 42 teams (the cup title holder, national domestic league champions, and a variable number of other clubs from the most important national domestic leagues) played knock-out rounds on a home and away basis. The aggregate score of both games decided the winner.
- The sixteen remaining teams after the knock-out rounds entered the Regular Season Group Stage, divided into two groups of eight teams, playing a round-robin. The final standing was based on individual wins and defeats. In the case of a tie between two or more teams after the group stage, the following criteria were used to decide the final classification: 1) number of wins in one-to-one games between the teams; 2) basket average between the teams; 3) general basket average within the group.
- The top four teams from each group after the Regular Season Group Stage qualified for a Quarterfinal Playoff (X-pairings, best of 3 games).
- The four winners of the Quarterfinal Playoff qualified for the Final Stage (Final Four), which was played at a predetermined venue.

== Team allocation ==
The labels in the parentheses show how each team qualified for the place of its starting round:

- TH: Title holder
- 1st, 2nd, 3rd, 4th, 5th, etc.: League position after eventual Playoffs

Group stage
(Italy) Benetton Treviso (1st)	(Spain) Marbella Joventut (1st)	(Federal Republic of Yugoslavia) ~~Partizan~~* (1st)^{TH}	
Second round
(Italy) Scavolini Pesaro (2nd)	(Croatia) Cibona (1st)	(Israel) Maccabi Elite Tel Aviv (1st)	(Federal Republic of Yugoslavia) ~~Crvena zvezda~~** (2nd)
(Italy) Knorr Bologna (3rd)	(Croatia) Zadar (2nd)	(Israel) Hapoel Tel Aviv (2nd)	
(Spain) Real Madrid Teka (2nd)	(France) Pau-Orthez (1st)	(Greece) Olympiacos (2nd)	
(Spain) Estudiantes Argentaria (3rd)	(France) Limoges CSP (2nd)	(Latvia) ASK Brocēni (1st)	
First round
(Albania) Partizani Tirana (1st)	(Estonia) Kalev Tallinn (1st)	(Lithuania) Žalgiris (1st)	(Slovenia) Smelt Olimpija (1st)
(Austria) Union SPI Basket Flyers (1st)	(Germany) Bayer 04 Leverkusen (1st)	(Luxembourg) Etzella (1st)	(Sweden) Scania Sodertalje
(Belgium) Maes Pils (1st)	(Georgia (country)) Dinamo Tbilisi (1st)	(Netherlands) Commodore Den Helder (1st)	(Switzerland) Benetton Fribourg (1st)
(Bulgaria) CSKA Sofia (1st)	(Greece) PAOK (1st)	(Poland) Śląsk Wroclaw (1st)	(Turkey) Efes Pilsen (1st)
(Cyprus) Pezoporikos Larnaca (1st)	(Finland) NMKY Helsinki (1st)	(Portugal) Benfica (1st)	(Ukraine) Budivelnyk (1st)
(Czech Republic) USK Praha (1st)	(Hungary) ZTE Heraklith (1st)	(Romania) Universitatea Cluj (1st)	
(England) Guildford Kings (1st)	(Iceland) Keflavik (1st)	(Russia) CSKA Moscow (1st)	

^{*}Partizan was drawn for the competition but was not allowed to compete due to UN embargo on FR Yugoslavia. FIBA decided not to replace Partizan with another team for the Regular Season Group Stage, so the 15 qualified clubs had to be unevenly distributed in this round (a group of 8 teams and another of only 7).

**Crvena zvezda was drawn for the competition but was not allowed to compete due to UN embargo on FR Yugoslavia. PAOK went through with a walkover.

== First round ==
Team 1	Agg.	Team 2	1st leg	2nd leg
Partizani Tirana (Albania)	133–232	(Bulgaria) CSKA Sofia	75–107	58–125
Dinamo Tbilisi (Georgia (country))	180–237	(Poland) Śląsk Wrocław	85–124	95–113
Universitatea Cluj (Romania)	146–188	(Czechoslovakia) USK Praha	59–85	87–103
ZTE Heraklith (Hungary)	154–185	(Ukraine) Budivelnyk	79–86	75–99
Keflavik (Iceland)	191–256	(Germany) Bayer 04 Leverkusen	100–130	91–126
Pezoporikos Larnaca (Cyprus)	130–211	(Greece) PAOK	61–104	69–107
Žalgiris (Lithuania)	169–177	(Slovenia) Smelt Olimpija	80–74	89–103
Kalev (Estonia)	153–154	(England) Guildford Kings	80–75	73–79
Efes Pilsen (Turkey)	174–123	(Switzerland) Benetton Fribourg	91–59	83–64
NMKY Helsinki (Finland)	160–152	(Austria) Union SPI Basket Flyers	95–63	65–89
CSKA Moscow (Russia)	174–168	(Netherlands) Commodore Den Helder	95–94	79–74
Etzella (Luxembourg)	130–218	(Portugal) Benfica	72–113	58–105
Scania Södertälje (Sweden)	169–190	(Belgium) Maes Pils	86–93	83–97

== Second round ==
Team 1	Agg.	Team 2	1st leg	2nd leg
CSKA Sofia (Bulgaria)	151–200	(Spain) Real Madrid Teka	73–103	78–97
Śląsk Wrocław (Poland)	154–195	(Italy) Scavolini Pesaro	72–91	82–104
USK Praha (Czechoslovakia)	152–175	(Spain) Estudiantes Argentaria	84–99	68–76
Budivelnyk (Ukraine)	165–210	(Italy) Knorr Bologna	80–114	85–96
Bayer 04 Leverkusen (Germany)	245–191	(Latvia) ASK Brocēni	126–103	119–88
Crvena zvezda (Federal Republic of Yugoslavia)	0–4^{**}	(Greece) PAOK	0–2	0–2
Smelt Olimpija (Slovenia)	166–176	(Greece) Olympiacos	85–88	81–88
Guildford Kings (England)	129–143	(France) Limoges CSP	72–72	57–71
Efes Pilsen (Turkey)	120–131	(France) Pau-Orthez	65–67	55–64
NMKY Helsinki (Finland)	175–192	(Croatia) Cibona	87–83	88–109
CSKA Moscow (Russia)	173–174	(Croatia) Zadar	95–86	78–88
Benfica (Portugal)	156–189	(Israel) Maccabi Elite Tel Aviv	75–89	81–100
Hapoel Tel Aviv (Israel)	164–170	(Belgium) Maes Pils	88–80	76–90

== Group stage ==
If one or more clubs are level on won-lost record, tiebreakers are applied in the following order:

1. Head-to-head record in matches between the tied clubs
2. Overall point difference in games between the tied clubs
3. Overall point difference in all group matches (first tiebreaker if tied clubs are not in the same group)
4. Points scored in all group matches
5. Sum of quotients of points scored and points allowed in each group match

Key to colors
Qualified to Playoff
Eliminated

=== Group A ===
	Team	Pld	Pts	W	L	PF	PA	PD
1.	(Greece) PAOK	12	20	8	4	879	839	+40
2.	(France) Limoges CSP	12	19	7	5	816	757	+59
3.	(Italy) Scavolini Pesaro	12	19	7	5	887	877	+10
4.	(Italy) Knorr Bologna	12	18	6	6	938	893	+45
5.	(Spain) Joventut Marbella	12	18	6	6	945	946	-1
6.	(Croatia) Cibona	12	17	5	7	909	976	-67
7.	(Israel) Maccabi Elite Tel Aviv	12	15	3	9	934	1020	-86
8.	(Federal Republic of Yugoslavia) Partizan*	0	0	0	0	0	0	0

=== Group B ===
	Team	Pld	Pts	W	L	PF	PA	PD
1.	(Spain) Real Madrid Teka	14	26	12	2	1181	1031	+150
2.	(Italy) Benetton Treviso	14	24	10	4	1127	1073	+54
3.	(Greece) Olympiacos	14	22	8	6	1057	1023	+34
4.	(France) Pau-Orthez	14	22	8	6	1113	1100	+13
5.	(Germany) Bayer 04 Leverkusen	14	22	8	6	1099	1105	-6
6.	(Croatia) Zadar	14	19	5	9	1096	1198	-102
7.	(Spain) Estudiantes Argentaria	14	18	4	10	1132	1131	+1
8.	(Belgium) Maes Pils	14	15	1	13	1092	1236	-144

== Quarterfinals ==
Seeded teams played games 2 and 3 at home.

Team 1	Agg.	Team 2	1st leg	2nd leg	3rd leg
Pau-Orthez (France)	0–2	(Greece) PAOK	86–103	65–81	
Olympiacos (Greece)	1–2	(France) Limoges CSP	70–67	53–59	58–60
Knorr Bologna (Italy)	0–2	(Spain) Real Madrid Teka	56–76	58–79	
Scavolini Pesaro (Italy)	1–2	(Italy) Benetton Treviso	94–92	94–101	58–77

== Final four ==
=== Semifinals ===
April 13, Peace and Friendship Stadium, Piraeus

Team 1	Score	Team 2
Real Madrid Teka (Spain)	52–62	(France) Limoges CSP
PAOK (Greece)	77–79	(Italy) Benetton Treviso

=== 3rd place game ===
April 15, Peace and Friendship Stadium, Piraeus

Team 1	Score	Team 2
Real Madrid Teka (Spain)	70–76	(Greece) PAOK

=== Final ===
April 15, Peace and Friendship Stadium, Piraeus

Team 1	Score	Team 2
Benetton Treviso (Italy)	55–59	(France) Limoges CSP

1992–93 FIBA European League
Champions

Limoges CSP
1st Title

=== Final standings ===
	Team
	(France) Limoges CSP
2nd place, silver medalist(s)	(Italy) Benetton Treviso
3rd place, bronze medalist(s)	(Greece) PAOK
	(Spain) Real Madrid Teka

== Awards ==
Award	Player	Club	Ref.
Season Top Scorer	(Croatia) Zdravko Radulović	(Croatia) Cibona	
Final Four MVP	(Croatia) Toni Kukoč	(Italy) Benetton Treviso	
Finals Top Scorer	(United States) Terry Teagle	(Italy) Benetton Treviso	

== 1993 FIBA European League All-Final Four Team ==
Position	Player	Club	Ref.
Point guard	(Greece) John Korfas	(Greece) PAOK	
Shooting guard	(Slovenia) Jure Zdovc	(France) Limoges CSP	
Small forward	(Croatia) Toni Kukoč (MVP)	(Italy) Benetton Treviso	
Power forward	(United States) Cliff Levingston	(Greece) PAOK	
Center	(Italy) Stefano Rusconi	(Italy) Benetton Treviso	
