= Ahmed Soliman (basketball) =

Egyptian basketball player (born 1965)

Ahmed Soliman (born 11 December 1965) is a former Egyptian basketball player. Soliman competed for Egypt at the 1988 Summer Olympics, where he scored 4 points in 4 games.
