= Choi Chul-kwon =

South Korean basketball player

Personal information
- Nationality: South Korean
- Born: 19 July 1963 (age 62); Seoul, South Korea

Sport
- Sport: Basketball

Korean name
- Hangul: 최철권
- Hanja: 崔喆權
- RR: Choe Cheolgwon
- MR: Ch'oe Ch'ŏlgwŏn

Choi Chul-kwon (Korean: 최철권, born 19 July 1963) is a South Korean basketball player. He competed in the men's tournament at the 1988 Summer Olympics.
