= Moustafa Amer =

Egyptian swimmer

Personal information
- Born: 1 September 1967 (age 58)

Sport
- Sport: Swimming

Moustafa Amer (born 1 September 1967) is an Egyptian swimmer. He competed in three events at the 1988 Summer Olympics.
