= Tony Zeno =

American basketball player (born 1957)

Personal information
- Born: October 1, 1957 (age 69) New Orleans, Louisiana, U.S.
- Listed height: 6 ft 8 in (2.03 m)
- Listed weight: 210 lb (95 kg)

Career information
- High school: Washington Preparatory (Los Angeles, California)
- College: Arizona State (1975–1979)
- NBA draft: 1979: 2nd round, 32nd overall pick
- Drafted by: Indiana Pacers
- Playing career: 1979–1990
- Position: Small forward / power forward
- Number: 44

Career history
- 1979: Indiana Pacers
- 1980–1981: Racing Maes Pils Mechelen
- 1981–1983: Acqua Fabia / Binova Rieti
- 1983–1986: Libertas Brindisi
- 1987–1988: Facar Pescara
- 1988–1989: Hapoel Holon
- 1989–1990: BCM Gravelines
- Stats at NBA.com
- Stats at Basketball Reference

Anthony Michael Zeno (born October 1, 1957) is an American former professional basketball player. He was a 6-foot-8-inch (2.03 m), 210-pound (95 kg) small forward-power forward. He played professionally in the National Basketball Association (NBA) and in Belgium, Israel, France, and most prominently, Italy.

== College career ==
Zeno played college basketball at Arizona State University, with the Sun Devils, from 1975 to 1979.

== Professional career ==
Zeno was selected by the Indiana Pacers, in the second round, with the 32nd overall pick of the 1979 NBA draft. He averaged 1.8 points and 1.8 rebounds per game, in eight games played with the Pacers during the 1979–80 season. Zeno scored 2 points in his very first game with the Pacers.

In 1979, Zeno went to play in the Belgian League, with Maes Pils Mechelen. In November 1980, when Zeno was played with his Belgian team against the Polish club Śląsk Wrocław, he broke a backboard with a slam dunk. After that, he went on to play professionally in the Italian League, and in the Israeli Super League with Hapoel Holon, during the 1988–89 season.

== Career statistics ==
Legend
GP	Games played	GS	Games started	MPG	Minutes per game
FG%	Field goal percentage	3P%	3-point field goal percentage	FT%	Free throw percentage
RPG	Rebounds per game	APG	Assists per game	SPG	Steals per game
BPG	Blocks per game	PPG	Points per game	**Bold**	Career high

=== NBA ===
==== Regular season ====
Year	Team	GP	GS	MPG	FG%	3P%	FT%	RPG	APG	SPG	BPG	PPG
1979–80	Indiana	8	0	7.4	.286	–	1.000	1.8	.1	.5	.4	1.8
