= Christian Gombe =

Central African basketball player

Personal information
- Born: 22 February 1962 (age 64)
- Listed height: 6 ft 3 in (1.91 m)
- Listed weight: 194 lb (88 kg)

Christian Gombe (born 22 February 1962) is a Central African basketball player. He competed at the 1988 Summer Olympics with the Central African Republic national basketball team.
