= Vicente Ithier =

Puerto Rican basketball player

Personal information
- Nationality: Puerto Rican
- Born: 22 April 1962 (age 63)

Sport
- Sport: Basketball

Vicente Ithier (born 22 April 1962) is a Puerto Rican basketball player. He competed in the men's tournament at the 1988 Summer Olympics.
