= Amin Amer =

Egyptian swimmer

Personal information
- Born: 1 August 1966 (age 59)

Sport
- Sport: Swimming

Amin Amer (born 1 August 1966) is an Egyptian swimmer. He competed in two events at the 1988 Summer Olympics.
