= Sanda Bouba Oumarou =

Central African Republic basketball player and sports administrator

Sanda Bouba Oumarou (born 1 January 1958) is a basketball player and sports administrator from the Central African Republic. He competed at the 1988 Summer Olympics with the Central African Republic national basketball team. He is also head of the National Olympic Committee of the Central African Republic.
