= Mahmoud Mahgoub =

Egyptian weightlifter

Personal information
- Nationality: Egyptian
- Born: 27 July 1964 (age 60)

Sport
- Sport: Weightlifting

Mahmoud Mahgoub (born 27 July 1964) is an Egyptian weightlifter. He competed at the 1984 Summer Olympics, the 1988 Summer Olympics and the 1992 Summer Olympics.
