= Oh Seh-wong =

South Korean basketball player

Personal information
- Nationality: South Korean
- Born: 20 June 1961 (age 64)

Sport
- Sport: Basketball

Korean name
- Hangul: 오세웅
- Hanja: 吳世雄
- RR: O Seung
- MR: O Seung

Oh Seh-wong (born 20 June 1961) is a South Korean basketball player. He competed in the men's tournament at the 1988 Summer Olympics.
