= Guy M'Bongo =

Central African Republic basketball player

Guy M'Bongo (born 23 September 1968) is a basketball player from the Central African Republic. He competed at the 1988 Summer Olympics with the Central African Republic national basketball team. He later attended St. Francis Xavier University where he starred on the 1993 National Championship team.
