= Alaa El-Din Abdoun =

Egyptian basketball player (born 1965)

Personal information
- Nationality: Egyptian
- Born: 19 February 1965 (age 60)
- Height: 1.88 m (6 ft 2 in)
- Weight: 78 kg (172 lb)

Sport
- Sport: Basketball

Alaa El-Din Abdoun (born 19 February 1965) is an Egyptian basketball player. He competed in the 1988 Summer Olympics.
