= El-Sayed Mohamed =

Egyptian basketball player

Personal information
- Nationality: Egyptian
- Born: 3 September 1965 (age 59)

Sport
- Sport: Basketball

El-Sayed Mohamed (born 3 September 1965) is an Egyptian basketball player. He competed in the men's tournament at the 1988 Summer Olympics.
