= Emad El-Din Mahmoud Ali =

Egyptian basketball player (born 1966)

Personal information
- Nationality: Egyptian
- Born: 21 March 1966 (age 60)

Sport
- Sport: Basketball

Emad El-Din Mahmoud Ali (born 21 March 1966) is an Egyptian basketball player. He competed in the men's tournament at the 1988 Summer Olympics.
