= Ashraf El-Kordy =

Egyptian basketball player (born 1967)

Personal information
- Nationality: Egyptian
- Born: 15 January 1967 (age 59)

Sport
- Sport: Basketball

Ashraf El-Kordy (born 15 January 1967) is an Egyptian basketball player. He competed in the men's tournament at the 1988 Summer Olympics.
