= Mohamed Ismail (basketball) =

Egyptian basketball player

Personal information
- Nationality: Egyptian
- Born: 28 October 1958 (age 66)

Sport
- Sport: Basketball

Mohamed Ismail (born 28 October 1958) is an Egyptian basketball player. He competed in the men's tournament at the 1988 Summer Olympics.
