= 1991–92 FIBA European League =

- League: FIBA European League
- Sport: Basketball

Regular Season
- Top scorer: (Greece) Nikos Galis (Aris)

Final Four
- Champions: (Socialist Federal Republic of Yugoslavia) Partizan (1st title)
- Runners-up: (Spain) Montigalà Joventut
- Final Four MVP: (Socialist Federal Republic of Yugoslavia) Predrag Danilović (Partizan)

FIBA European League seasons
- ← 1990–91 1992–93 →

The 1991–92 FIBA European League, also shortened to 1991–92 FIBA EuroLeague, was the 35th installment of the European top-tier level professional club competition for basketball clubs (now called EuroLeague). The competition's Final Four was held at the Abdi İpekçi Arena in Istanbul, Turkey. It was won by Partizan, who defeated Montigalà Joventut, by a result of 71–70.

This season of the competition also marked an end to the era of European national domestic league champions only participation, as it featured an expanded competition, that included national domestic league champions, the current league title holders, and some other teams from the most important national domestic leagues. That also was in accordance with the league being renamed, and being called the FIBA European League (or shortened to FIBA EuroLeague) championship for men's clubs. This was because the new competition format was closer to a true European League in style. It was a name the competition would keep for the next four editions of the competition as well.

== Competition system ==
- 33 teams (the cup title holder, national domestic league champions, and a variable number of other clubs from the most important national domestic leagues) played knock-out rounds on a home and away basis. The aggregate score of both games decided the winner.
- The sixteen remaining teams after the knock-out rounds entered the Regular Season Group Stage, divided into two groups of eight teams, playing a round-robin. The final standing was based on individual wins and defeats. In the case of a tie between two or more teams after the group stage, the following criteria were used to decide the final classification: 1) number of wins in one-to-one games between the teams; 2) basket average between the teams; 3) general basket average within the group.
- The top four teams from each group after the Regular Season Group Stage qualified for a Quarterfinal Playoff (X-pairings, best of 3 games).
- The four winners of the Quarterfinal Playoff qualified for the Final Stage (Final Four), which was played at a predetermined venue.

== First round ==
Team 1	Agg.	Team 2	1st leg	2nd leg
Möllersdorf Traiskirchen (Austria)	158–213	(Belgium) Maes Pils	78–107	80–106
Pezoporikos Larnaca (Cyprus)	175–174	(Czechoslovakia) USK Praha	92–88	83–86
Partizani Tirana (Albania)	146–208	(Greece) Aris	79–98	67–110
Maccabi Rishon LeZion (Israel)	213–157	(Romania) Steaua București	111–78	102–79
Union Sportive Hiefenech (Luxembourg)	161–182	(Switzerland) Vevey	84–84	77–98

== Second round ==
Team 1	Agg.	Team 2	1st leg	2nd leg
Maes Pils (Belgium)	175–150	(England) Kingston	86–76	89–74
Pezoporikos Larnaca (Cyprus)	162–233	(Italy) Knorr Bologna	88–109	74–124
Śląsk Wrocław (Poland)	162–181	(Greece) Aris	74–75	88–106
Maccabi Rishon LeZion (Israel)	144–148	(Netherlands) Commodore Den Helder	89–75	55–73
Vevey (Switzerland)	163–199	(Estonia) Kalev^{**}	81–86	82–113
Scania Södertälje (Sweden)	154–195	(Spain) Estudiantes Caja Postal	76–98	78–97
KTP (Finland)	154–211	(Italy) Philips Milano	84–105	70–106
Fenerbahçe (Turkey)	123–174	(Spain) FC Barcelona Banca Catalana	73–79	50–95
Szolnoki Olajbányász (Hungary)	137–181	(Socialist Federal Republic of Yugoslavia) Partizan	65–92	72–89
CSKA Sofia (Bulgaria)	140–235	(Germany) Bayer 04 Leverkusen	77–132	63–103
Ungmennafélag Njarðvíkur (Iceland)	150–208	(Croatia) Cibona	76–111	74–97
Benfica (Portugal)	163–164	(France) Olympique Antibes	89–76	74–88

Automatically qualified to the group stage

- (Croatia) Slobodna Dalmacija (title holder)
- (Spain) Montigalà Joventut
- (Italy) Phonola Caserta
- (Israel) Maccabi Elite Tel Aviv

== Regular season ==
The Regular Season begins on October 31.

If teams are level on record at the end of the Regular Season, tiebreakers are applied in the following order:

1. Head-to-head record.
2. Head-to-head point differential.
3. Point differential during the Regular Season.
4. Points scored during the regular season.
5. Sum of quotients of points scored and points allowed in each Regular Season match.

Key to colors
Top four places in each group advance to Quarterfinals

=== Group A ===
	Team	Pld	Pts	W	L	PF	PA	PD
1.	(Italy) Knorr Bologna	14	24	10	4	1229	1148	+81
2.	(Spain) FC Barcelona Banca Catalana	14	24	10	4	1205	1129	+76
3.	(Israel) Maccabi Elite Tel Aviv	14	24	10	4	1311	1254	+57
4.	(Croatia) Cibona^{*}	14	23	9	5	1287	1232	+55
5.	(Croatia) Slobodna Dalmacija^{*}	14	21	7	7	1271	1270	+1
6.	(France) Olympique Antibes	14	18	4	10	1291	1385	-94
7.	(Estonia) Kalev^{**}	14	17	3	11	1281	1354	-73
8.	(Italy) Phonola Caserta	14	14	3	11	1185	1288	-103

=== Group B ===
	Team	Pld	Pts	W	L	PF	PA	PD
1.	(Spain) Montigalà Joventut	14	25	11	3	1276	1114	+162
2.	(Spain) Estudiantes Caja Postal	14	24	10	4	1145	1096	+49
3.	(Italy) Philips Milano	14	24	10	4	1264	1161	+103
4.	(Socialist Federal Republic of Yugoslavia) Partizan^{*}	14	23	9	5	1178	1077	+101
5.	(Germany) Bayer 04 Leverkusen	14	21	7	7	1217	1154	+63
6.	(Belgium) Maes Pils	14	18	4	10	1112	1230	-118
7.	(Greece) Aris	14	17	3	11	1139	1359	-220
8.	(Netherlands) Commodore Den Helder	14	16	2	12	1050	1190	-140

- ^{*} Due to ongoing Yugoslav Wars, the three former Yugoslavian teams were forced to play all their home games outside their countries. All of them chose cities in Spain as the substitute home courts: eventual winner Partizan played in Fuenlabrada, title holder Slobodna Dalmacija in A Coruña and Cibona in Puerto Real.

^{**} Kalev played in the tournament as USSR League 1990-1991 champion.

== Quarterfinals ==
Seeded teams played games 2 and 3 at home.

Team 1	Agg.	Team 2	1st leg	2nd leg	3rd leg
Partizan (Socialist Federal Republic of Yugoslavia)	2–1	(Italy) Knorr Bologna	78–65	60–61	69–65
Philips Milano (Italy)	2–0	(Spain) FC Barcelona Banca Catalana	80–79	86–71	
Cibona (Croatia)	0–2	(Spain) Montigalà Joventut	68–73	67–92	
Maccabi Elite Tel Aviv (Israel)	1–2	(Spain) Estudiantes Caja Postal	98–97	74–98	54–55

== Final four ==
=== Semifinals ===
April 14, Abdi İpekçi Arena, Istanbul

Team 1	Score	Team 2
Partizan (Socialist Federal Republic of Yugoslavia)	82–75	(Italy) Philips Milano
Montigalà Joventut (Spain)	91–69	(Spain) Estudiantes Argentaria

=== 3rd place game ===
April 16, Abdi İpekçi Arena, Istanbul

Team 1	Score	Team 2
Philips Milano (Italy)	99–81	(Spain) Estudiantes Argentaria

=== Final ===
April 16, Abdi İpekçi Arena, Istanbul

Team 1	Score	Team 2
Partizan (Socialist Federal Republic of Yugoslavia)	71–70	(Spain) Montigalà Joventut

1991–92 FIBA European League
Champions

Partizan
1st Title

=== Final standings ===
	Team
	(Socialist Federal Republic of Yugoslavia) Partizan
Silver medal	(Spain) Montigalà Joventut
Bronze medal	(Italy) Philips Milano
	(Spain) Estudiantes Argentaria

== Awards ==
Award	Player	Club	Ref.
Season Top Scorer	(Greece) Nikos Galis	(Greece) Aris	
Final Four MVP	(Socialist Federal Republic of Yugoslavia) Predrag Danilović	(Socialist Federal Republic of Yugoslavia) Partizan	
Finals Top Scorer	(Socialist Federal Republic of Yugoslavia) Predrag Danilović	(Socialist Federal Republic of Yugoslavia) Partizan	

== 1992 FIBA European League All-Final Four Team ==
Position	Player	Club	Ref.
Point guard	(Socialist Federal Republic of Yugoslavia) Aleksandar Djordjevic	(Socialist Federal Republic of Yugoslavia) Partizan	
Shooting guard	(Socialist Federal Republic of Yugoslavia) Predrag Danilović (MVP)	(Socialist Federal Republic of Yugoslavia) Partizan	
Small forward	(Spain) Jordi Villacampa	(Spain) Montigalà Joventut	
Power forward	(United States) Harold Pressley	(Spain) Montigalà Joventut	
Center	(Socialist Federal Republic of Yugoslavia) Slaviša Koprivica	(Socialist Federal Republic of Yugoslavia) Partizan	

== See also ==
- 1991-92 FIBA European Cup
- 1991-92 FIBA Korać Cup
