= Mohamed El-Shakeri =

Egyptian basketball player

Personal information
- Nationality: Egyptian
- Born: 7 November 1968 (age 56)

Sport
- Sport: Basketball

Mohamed El-Shakeri (born 7 November 1968) is an Egyptian basketball player. He competed in the men's tournament at the 1988 Summer Olympics.
