= Ashraf Sedky =

Egyptian basketball player (born 1968)

Personal information
- Nationality: Egyptian
- Born: 10 March 1968 (age 58) Alexandria, Egypt

Sport
- Sport: Basketball

Ashraf Sedky (born 10 March 1968) is an Egyptian former basketball player. He competed in the men's tournament at the 1988 Summer Olympics.
