= Zhang Yongjun =

Chinese basketball player and coach

Zhang Yongjun 张勇军
Personal information
- Born: 4 January 1963 (age 63) Huangshi, Hubei, China

Career information
- Playing career: 1984–1997

Career history

Coaching
- 1997–2000: Guangdong Southern Tigers
- 2002–2004: China Men U18
- 2004–2006: Dongguan New Century Leopards
- 2007: Shanxi Zhongyu
Medals
Men's basketball
Representing China
FIBA Asia Cup
Gold medal – first place	1987 Bangkok
Gold medal – first place	1989 Beijing
Asian Games
Gold medal – first place	1990 Beijing

Zhang Yongjun (simplified Chinese: 张勇军; traditional Chinese: 張勇軍; born 4 January 1963 in Huangshi, Hubei) is a Chinese basketball coach and former international player who competed in the 1988 and 1992 Summer Olympic Games for China. In 2014, he was named the head coach of the Zhejiang Chouzhou Golden Bulls, a professional club in the Chinese Basketball Association (CBA).
