= Abdel Meguid Amir =

Egyptian basketball player (born 1961)

Abdel Meguid Amir (born 18 June 1961), also known as Amir Abdel Meguid or Amr Abduelkhir, is an Egyptian former basketball player.

== Career ==
Amir competed for Egypt at the 1984 and the 1988 Summer Olympics, where he scored 97 points in 13 games. He also competed at the 1990 FIBA World Championship.
