= Richard Bella =

Central African basketball player

Personal information
- Born: 3 April 1967 (age 59) Bimbo, Central African Republic
- Listed height: 6 ft 9 in (2.06 m)
- Listed weight: 236 lb (107 kg)

Career information
- College: St. Francis Xavier (1989–1993)
- NBA draft: 1993: undrafted
- Playing career: 1993–1994
- Position: Center

Career history
- 1993–1994: Francorosso Torino
- 1994: Libertas Udine

Richard Felicié Bella (born 3 April 1967) is a Central African former professional basketball player. He competed at the 1988 Summer Olympics with the Central African Republic national basketball team.

Bella played college basketball in Canada for the St. Francis Xavier X-Men. He played for Francorosso Torino of the Italian Serie A2 Basket during the 1993–94 season. Bella played for the start of the 1994–95 season with Libertas Udine of the same league.
