= Wang Libin =

Chinese basketball player and coach

Wang Libin 王立彬
Personal information
- Born: 21 March 1963 (age 63) Xi'an, Shaanxi, China
- Listed height: 6.75 ft 0 in (2.06 m)

Career information
- Playing career: 1981–2001
- Position: Center

Career history

Coaching
- 2004–2007: Shaanxi Kylins
Medals
Men's basketball
Representing China
FIBA Asia Cup
Gold medal – first place	1983 Hong Kong
Asian Games
Gold medal – first place	1986 Seoul
ABC Under-18 Championship
Gold medal – first place	1980 Bangkok
Silver medal – second place	1982 Quezon City

Wang Libin (Chinese: 王立彬; pinyin: Wáng Lìbīn; born March 21, 1963) is a Chinese former male basketball player and an active basketball coach. He was born in Shaanxi Province, People's Republic of China.

Wang started his playing career at the age of 14 and was one of the most talented front court players in Asia. 6'8", Wang was not only a powerful inside player with solid footwork and impressive mobility but also a stable long range shooter. Some dubbed him as "Asia's number one centre" during his prime in the 1980s. As a member of the China men's national basketball team he competed at the 1984 Los Angeles Olympic Games and was the flag bearer of the Chinese Olympic Team at the opening ceremony. Due to power struggles within China's basketball authorities, however, he was banned from playing for the national team at the age of 25—shortly after he competed at the 1988 Summer Olympics.

After this forced "retirement", Wang accepted the invitation by a semi-professional club, Isuzu Motors Lynx, based in Yokohama, Japan to play there. In 1993, he moved to play for the Tera Electronics club in Taiwan and retired there after a decade-long "post-retirement" career as overseas professional player. Owning a restaurant named after his triple-double ("大三元") record in Taipei, Wang later served in ESPN Star Sports as a basketball analyst/commentator in Mandarin Chinese. He also participated in the training of the Chinese Taipei men's national basketball team.

In 2004, Wang returned to his hometown, Xi'an, to coach the Shaanxi Kylins, a professional team in the Chinese Basketball Association (CBA). After two unsuccessful seasons coaching in the CBA, Wang resigned as the Kylins head coach and accepted another commission to coach the Northwestern Polytechnical University varsity team.
