= Hany Moussa =

Egyptian basketball player

Personal information
- Nationality: Egyptian
- Born: 19 June 1966 (age 58); Cairo, Egypt

Sport
- Sport: Basketball

Hany Moussa (born 19 June 1966) is an Egyptian basketball player. He competed in the men's tournament at the 1988 Summer Olympics.
