= Hisham Khalil =

Egyptian basketball player

Personal information
- Nationality: Egyptian
- Born: 8 November 1963 (age 62)

Sport
- Sport: Basketball

Hisham Khalil (born 8 November 1963) is an Egyptian basketball player. He competed in the men's tournament at the 1988 Summer Olympics.
