= China at the 1992 Summer Olympics =

- IOC code: CHN
- NOC: Chinese Olympic Committee
- Website: www.olympic.cn (in Chinese and English)

in Barcelona
- Competitors: 244 (117 men and 127 women) in 23 sports
- Flag bearer: Song Ligang
- Medals Ranked 4th: Gold 16 Silver 22 Bronze 16 Total 54

Summer Olympics appearances (overview)
- 1952; 1956–1980; 1984; 1988; 1992; 1996; 2000; 2004; 2008; 2012; 2016; 2020; 2024; 2028

Other related appearances
- Republic of China (1924–1948)

The People's Republic of China competed at the 1992 Summer Olympics in Barcelona, Spain. 244 competitors, 117 men and 127 women, took part in 144 events in 23 sports.

== Medalists ==
Medals by sport
Sport	1st place, gold medalist(s)	2nd place, silver medalist(s)	3rd place, bronze medalist(s)	Total
Swimming	4	5	0	9
Table tennis	3	2	1	6
Diving	3	1	1	5
Gymnastics	2	4	2	8
Shooting	2	2	0	4
Athletics	1	1	2	4
Judo	1	0	2	3
Weightlifting	0	2	2	4
Badminton	0	1	4	5
Archery	0	1	0	1
Basketball	0	1	0	1
Fencing	0	1	0	1
Sailing	0	1	0	1
Rowing	0	0	1	1
Wrestling	0	0	1	1
Total	16	22	16	54

After the olympics, the name "Five Golden Flowers" was given to the five medalist swimmers Yang Wenyi (50 meter Freestyle champion), Zhuang Yong (100 meter Freestyle champion), Lin Li (200 meter Individual Medley champion), Qian Hong (100 meter Butterfly champion) and Wang Xiaohong (200 meter Butterfly silver medalist).

Medal	Name	Sport	Event	Date
Gold	Zhuang Yong	Swimming	Women's 100 metre freestyle	26 July
Gold	Fu Mingxia	Diving	Women's 10 metre platform	27 July
Gold	Zhuang Xiaoyan	Judo	Women's +72 kg	27 July
Gold	Wang Yifu	Shooting	Men's 10 metre air pistol	28 July
Gold	Zhang Shan	Shooting	Skeet	28 July
Gold	Qian Hong	Swimming	Women's 100 metre butterfly	29 July
Gold	Lin Li	Swimming	Women's 200 metre individual medley	30 July
Gold	Yang Wenyi	Swimming	Women's 50 metre freestyle	31 July
Gold	Lu Li	Gymnastics	Women's uneven bars	1 August
Gold	Gao Min	Diving	Women's 3 metre springboard	2 August
Gold	Li Xiaoshuang	Gymnastics	Men's floor	2 August
Gold	Deng Yaping; Qiao Hong	Table tennis	Women's doubles	3 August
Gold	Sun Shuwei	Diving	Men's 10 metre platform	3 August
Gold	Chen Yueling	Athletics	Women's 10 kilometres walk	3 August
Gold	Lu Lin; Wang Tao	Table tennis	Men's doubles	4 August
Gold	Deng Yaping	Table tennis	Women's singles	5 August
Silver	Wang Yifu	Shooting	Men's 50 metre pistol	26 July
Silver	Lin Li	Swimming	Women's 400 metre individual medley	26 July
Silver	Lin Qisheng	Weightlifting	Men's 52 kg	26 July
Silver	Li Duihong	Shooting	Women's 25 metre pistol	27 July
Silver	Lin Li	Swimming	Women's 200 metre breaststroke	27 July
Silver	Liu Shoubin	Weightlifting	Men's 56 kg	27 July
Silver	Le Jingyi; Lu Bin; Yang Wenyi; Zhao Kun; Zhuang Yong	Swimming	Women's 4 × 100 metre freestyle relay	28 July
Silver	Tan Liangde	Diving	Men's 3 metre springboard	29 July
Silver	Guo Linyao; Li Chunyang; Li Dashuang; Li Ge; Li Jing; Li Xiaoshuang	Gymnastics	Men's artistic team all-around	29 July
Silver	Wang Huifeng	Fencing	Women's foil	30 July
Silver	Wang Xiaohong	Swimming	Women's 200 metre butterfly	31 July
Silver	Zhuang Yong	Swimming	Women's 50 metre freestyle	31 July
Silver	Lu Li	Gymnastics	Women's balance beam	1 August
Silver	Zhang Xiaodong	Sailing	Women's Lechner A-390	2 August
Silver	Li Jing	Gymnastics	Men's rings	2 August
Silver	Li Jing	Gymnastics	Men's parallel bars	2 August
Silver	Chen Zihe; Jun Gao	Table tennis	Women's doubles	3 August
Silver	Ma Xiangjun; Wang Xiaozhu; Wang Hong	Archery	Women's team	4 August
Silver	Guan Weizhen; Nong Qunhua	Badminton	Women's doubles	4 August
Silver	Qiao Hong	Table tennis	Women's singles	5 August
Silver	Huang Zhihong	Athletics	Women's shot put	7 August
Silver	China women's national basketball team: Cong Xuedi; He Jun; Li Dongmei; Li Xin; Liu Jun; Liu Qing; Peng Ping; Wang Fang; Zhan Shuping; Zheng Dongmei; Zheng Haixia	Basketball	Women's tournament	7 August
Bronze	Luo Jianming	Weightlifting	Men's 56 kg	27 July
Bronze	He Yingqiang	Weightlifting	Men's 60 kg	28 July
Bronze	Sheng Zetian	Wrestling	Men's Greco-Roman 57 kg	30 July
Bronze	Zhang Di	Judo	Women's 61 kg	30 July
Bronze	Gu Xiaoli; Lu Huali	Rowing	Women's double sculls	1 August
Bronze	Li Zhongyun	Judo	Women's 52 kg	1 August
Bronze	Li Xiaoshuang	Gymnastics	Men's rings	2 August
Bronze	Guo Linyao	Gymnastics	Men's parallel bars	2 August
Bronze	Xiong Ni	Diving	Men's 10 metre platform	3 August
Bronze	Li Yongbo; Tian Bingyi	Badminton	Men's doubles	3 August
Bronze	Huang Hua	Badminton	Women's singles	3 August
Bronze	Tang Jiuhong	Badminton	Women's singles	3 August
Bronze	Lin Yanfen; Yao Fen	Badminton	Women's doubles	3 August
Bronze	Li Chunxiu	Athletics	Women's 10 kilometres walk	3 August
Bronze	Ma Wenge	Table tennis	Men's singles	5 August
Bronze	Qu Yunxia	Athletics	Women's 1500 metres	8 August

== Competitors ==
The following is the list of number of competitors in the Games.

Sport	Men	Women	Total
Archery	3	3	6
Athletics	11	22	33
Badminton	7	6	13
Basketball	12	11	23
Boxing	4	–	4
Canoeing	0	4	4
Cycling	4	2	6
Diving	4	4	8
Fencing	10	5	15
Gymnastics	6	8	14
Judo	4	6	10
Modern pentathlon	1	–	1
Rowing	9	13	22
Sailing	1	2	3
Shooting	13	7	20
Swimming	4	12	16
Synchronized swimming	–	3	3
Table tennis	4	4	8
Tennis	2	3	5
Volleyball	0	12	12
Weightlifting	10	–	10
Wrestling	8	–	8
Total	117	127	244

== Archery ==
The People's Republic of China sent three men and three women to Barcelona for archery. Just as in 1984, the women were the more successful squad, winning the team silver. All three qualified for the elimination rounds, with one falling in the first round, another dropping in the second, and Wang Xiaozhu making it all the way to the semifinals before being defeated. In contrast, the men lost their first team match and only one qualified for individual eliminations.

Men

Athlete	Event	Ranking round		Round of 32	Round of 16	Quarterfinals	Semifinals	Final / BM	
Athlete	Event	Score	Seed	Opposition Score	Opposition Score	Opposition Score	Opposition Score	Opposition Score	Rank
Fu Shengjun	Individual	1284	25 Q	Setijawan (INA); L 96–106	Did not advance				
Hao Wei	Individual	1249	51	Did not advance					
Liang Qiang	Individual	1231	58	Did not advance					
Fu Shengjun; Hao Wei; Liang Qiang	Team	3764	14 Q	—N/a	Australia; L 230–238	Did not advance			

Women

Athlete	Event	Ranking round		Round of 32	Round of 16	Quarterfinals	Semifinals	Final / BM	
Athlete	Event	Score	Seed	Opposition Score	Opposition Score	Opposition Score	Opposition Score	Opposition Score	Rank
Ma Xiangjun	Individual	1313	11 Q	de Sousa (POR); W 101–98	Kvrivishvili (EUN); L 104–111	Did not advance			
Wang Hong	Individual	1302	17 Q	Kovács (HUN); L 93–103	Did not advance				
Wang Xiaozhu	Individual	1295	19 Q	Kim J-h (PRK); W 103–102	Lee (KOR); W 107–103	Kvrivishvili (EUN); W 108–101	Kim S-n (KOR); L 105–106	Valeeva (EUN); L 102–104	4
Ma Xiangjun; Wang Hong; Wang Xiaozhu	Team	3910	3 Q	—N/a	Netherlands; W 230–230	North Korea; W 235–227	Unified Team; W 224–224	South Korea; L 228–236	2nd place, silver medalist(s)

== Athletics ==
Men
Track and road events

Athlete	Event	Heats		Quarterfinal		Semifinal		Final	
Athlete	Event	Result	Rank	Result	Rank	Result	Rank	Result	Rank
Li Tong	110 m hurdles	13.69	15 Q	13.74	12 Q	13.62	9	Did not advance	
Chen Shaoguo	20 km walk	—N/a						1:24:06	5
Li Mingcai	20 km walk	—N/a						DNF	

Field events

Athlete	Event	Qualification		Final	
Athlete	Event	Distance	Position	Distance	Position
Xu Yang	High jump	2.20	26	Did not advance	
Chen Zunrong	Long jump	7.93	11 q	7.75	10
Huang Geng	Long jump	8.22	2 Q	7.87	8
Chen Yanping	Triple jump	15.66	36	Did not advance	
Zou Sixin	Triple jump	17.07	8 Q	17.00	8
Yu Wenge	Discus throw	59.42	17	Did not advance	
Bi Zhong	Hammer throw	74.30	13	Did not advance	
Zhang Lianbiao	Javelin throw	73.86	25	Did not advance	

Women
Track and road events

Athlete	Event	Heats		Quarterfinal		Semifinal		Final	
Athlete	Event	Result	Rank	Result	Rank	Result	Rank	Result	Rank
Gao Han	100 m	11.68	26 Q	11.76	28	Did not advance			
Tian Yumei	100 m	11.68	26 q	11.78	31	Did not advance			
Xiao Yehua	100 m	11.69	28 Q	11.73	27	Did not advance			
Chen Zhaojing	200 m	DQ		Did not advance					
Liu Li	1500 m	4:10.08	20 Q	—N/a		4:04.35	10 Q	4:00.20	5
Qu Yunxia	1500 m	4:07.40	1 Q	—N/a		4:03.86	5 Q	3:57.08	3rd place, bronze medalist(s)
Wang Xiuting	10,000 m	32:31.91	15 Q	—N/a				31:28.06	6
Zhong Huandi	10,000 m	32:04.46	3 Q	—N/a				31:21.08	4
Zhang Yu	100 m hurdles	13.26	19 Q	13.28	17 q	13.39	15	Did not advance	
Zhu Yuqing	100 m hurdles	13.22	16 q	13.31	19	Did not advance			
Gao Han; Tian Yumei; Chen Zhaojing; Xiao Yehua	4 × 100 m relay	43.70	10	—N/a				Did not advance	
Chen Yueling	10 km walk	—N/a						44:32 OR	1st place, gold medalist(s)
Cui Yingzi	10 km walk	—N/a						45:15	5
Li Chunxiu	10 km walk	—N/a						44:41	3rd place, bronze medalist(s)

Field events

Athlete	Event	Qualification		Final	
Athlete	Event	Distance	Position	Distance	Position
Liu Shuzhen	Long jump	6.44	16	Did not advance	
Yang Juan	Long jump	6.49	14	Did not advance	
Huang Zhihong	Shot put	18.93	5 Q	20.47	2nd place, silver medalist(s)
Zhen Wenhua	Shot put	18.17	10 q	17.81	12
Zhou Tianhua	Shot put	18.63	7 Q	19.26	5
Min Chunfeng	Discus throw	62.48	10 Q	60.82	11
Qiu Qiaoping	Discus throw	59.32	17	Did not advance	
Ha Xiaoyan	Javelin throw	59.70	15	Did not advance	
Xu Demei	Javelin throw	59.98	14	Did not advance	

Combined event – Heptathlon

Athlete	Event	100H	HJ	SP	200 m	LJ	JT	800 m	Total	Rank
Zhu Yuqing	Result	13.64	1.82	14.26	23.83	5.99	45.12	2:31.84	6123	16
Zhu Yuqing	Points	1030	1003	811	997	846	766	670	6123	16

== Badminton ==
Men

Athlete	Event	Round of 64	Round of 32	Round of 16	Quarterfinals	Semifinals	Final	
Athlete	Event	Opposition Result	Opposition Result	Opposition Result	Opposition Result	Opposition Result	Opposition Result	Rank
Liu Jun	Singles	Bye	Jäntti (FIN); W 15–13, 15–7	Stuer-Lauridsen (DEN); L 15–10, 16–17, 9–15	Did not advance			
Wu Wenkai	Singles	Bye	Kaul (CAN); W 15–7, 15–2	Kim H-k (KOR); L 15–10, 7–15, 13–18	Did not advance			
Zhao Jianhua	Singles	Bye	Hall (GBR); W 15–6, 15–9	Bhattacharjee (IND); W 15–4, 15–12	Susanto (INA); L 2–15, 17–14, 14–17	Did not advance		
Chen Hongyong; Chen Kang	Doubles	—N/a	Bitten / Blanshard (CAN); W 15–6, 15–12	Kim M-s / Park (KOR); L 15–11, 5–15, 9–15	Did not advance			
Li Yongbo; Tian Bingyi	Doubles	—N/a	Cheah / Soo (MAS); W 11–15, 18–15, 15–4	Siripool / Teerawiwatana (THA); W 9–15, 15–8, 15–8	Paulsen / Svarrer (DEN); W 15–11, 12–15, 17–14	Hartono / Gunawan (INA); L 9–15, 8–15	Did not advance	3rd place, bronze medalist(s)

Women

Athlete	Event	Round of 64	Round of 32	Round of 16	Quarterfinals	Semifinals	Final	
Athlete	Event	Opposition Result	Opposition Result	Opposition Result	Opposition Result	Opposition Result	Opposition Result	Rank
Huang Hua	Singles	Bye	French (USA); W 11–1, 11–1	Muggeridge (GBR); W 11–3, 11–2	Lee (KOR); W 11–3, 10–12, 11–0	Susanti (INA); L 4–11, 1–11	Did not advance	3rd place, bronze medalist(s)
Tang Jiuhong	Singles	Bye	Troke (GBR); W 11–3, 11–1	Julien (CAN); W 12–9, 11–0	Lao (AUS); W 11–9, 11–1	Bang (KOR); L 3–11, 2–11	Did not advance	3rd place, bronze medalist(s)
Guan Weizhen; Nong Qunhua	Doubles	—N/a	Bye	Stuer-Lauridsen / Thomsen (DEN); W 15–3, 15–12	C Bengtsson / M Bengtsson (SWE); W 15–4, 15–9	Gil / Shim (KOR); W 15–12, 2–15, 15–8	Hwang / Chung (KOR); L 16–18, 15–12, 13–15	2nd place, silver medalist(s)
Lin Yanfen; Yao Fen	Doubles	—N/a	Bye	Jinnai / Mori (JPN); W 15–7, 15–6	Cator / Lao (AUS); W 18–13, 15–5	Hwang / Chung (KOR); L 9–15, 8–15	Did not advance	3rd place, bronze medalist(s)

== Basketball ==
Summary

Key:

- OT – Overtime.

Team	Event	Group stage						Quarterfinal	Semi-final	Final / BM	
Team	Event	Opposition Score	Opposition Score	Opposition Score	Opposition Score	Opposition Score	Rank	Opposition Score	Opposition Score	Opposition Score	Rank
China men's	Men's tournament	Lithuania; L 75–112	Puerto Rico; L 68–100	Unified Team; L 84–100	Australia; L 66–88	Venezuela; L 88–96	6	—N/a	Angola; L 69–79	Venezuela; L 97–100	12
China women's	Women's tournament	Spain; W 66–63	United States; L 67–93	Czechoslovakia; W 72–70	—N/a		2 Q	—N/a	Cuba; W 109–70	Unified Team; L 66–76	2nd place, silver medalist(s)

=== Men's tournament ===
Team roster

China men's national basketball team roster
Players
Coaches

Pos.	No.	Name	Age – Date of birth	Height	Club	Ctr.
G	4	Adiljan Jun	24 – 21 August 1967
F	5	Li Chunjiang	29 – 11 March 1963		Liaoning Flying Leopards	(China)
C	6	Wang Zhidan	21 – 19 December 1970
F	7	Sun Jun	23 – 22 June 1969	1.97 m (6 ft 6 in)	Jilin Northeast Tigers	(China)
F	8	Hu Weidong	22 – 3 January 1970	1.98 m (6 ft 6 in)	Jiangsu Dragons	(China)
	9	Song Ligang	25 – 8 June 1967
G	10	Wu Qinglong	26 – 27 December 1965
G	11	Sun Fengwu	30 – 19 March 1962
F	12	Ma Jian	22 – 20 August 1969
G	13	Zhang Yongjun	29 – 4 January 1963
C	14	Shan Tao	22 – 30 May 1970
F/C	15	Gong Xiaobin	22 – 23 November 1969	2.02 m (6 ft 8 in)	Shandong Flaming Bulls	(China)

Head coach

- (China) Jiang Xingquan

Legend

- Club – describes last
  club before the competition
- Age – describes age
  on 26 July 1992

Group play

Pos	Team	Pld	W	L	PF	PA	PD	Pts	Qualification
1	Unified Team	5	4	1	425	373	+52	9 (Note: Head-to-head record: Unified Team 1–0 Lithuania)	Quarterfinals
2	Lithuania	5	4	1	481	424	+57	9	Quarterfinals
3	Australia	5	3	2	432	396	+36	8 (Note: Head-to-head record: Australia 1–0 Puerto Rico)	Quarterfinals
4	Puerto Rico	5	3	2	445	440	+5	8	Quarterfinals
5	Venezuela	5	1	4	392	427	−35	6	9th−12th classification round
6	China	5	0	5	381	496	−115	5	9th−12th classification round

Source: FIBA
Rules for classification: 1) points; 2) head-to-head points; 3) head-to-head goal average; 4) head-to-head number of points scored.
Notes:

26 July 1992
11:30
v

Boxscore

China	75–112	Lithuania
Scoring by half: 26–55, 49–57
Pts: Sun J. 22; Rebs: Sun J. 4 Asts: Sun J., Gong 3		Pts: Kurtinaitis 31; Rebs: Sabonis 14; Asts: Marčiulionis 12

Palau Municipal d'Esports de Badalona, Barcelona

27 July 1992
20:30
v

Boxscore

China	68–100	Puerto Rico
Scoring by half: 35–51, 33–49
Pts: Shan 22; Rebs: Shan 7 Asts: Song 3		Pts: Morales 15; Rebs: Rivas 4 Asts: Carter 12

Palau Municipal d'Esports de Badalona, Barcelona

29 July 1992
14:30
v

Boxscore

Unified Team	100–84	China
Scoring by half: 55–39, 45–45
Pts: Bazarevich 18; Rebs: Volkov 6 Asts: Bazarevich 6		Pts: Sun J. 22; Rebs: Wang 5 Asts: Adiljan 4

Palau Municipal d'Esports de Badalona, Barcelona

31 July 1992
14:30
v

Boxscore

Australia	88–66	China
Scoring by half: 39–28, 49–38
Pts: Gaze 30; Rebs: Bradtke 7 Asts: Gaze, Longley 4		Pts: Hu 15; Rebs: Wang 5 Asts: Sun F. 6

Palau Municipal d'Esports de Badalona, Barcelona

2 August 1992
14:30
v

Boxscore

Venezuela	96–88	China
Scoring by half: 52–52, 44–36
Pts: Herrera 23; Rebs: Herrera 10; Asts: Walcott 5		Pts: Gong 18; Rebs: Shan 3 Asts: Sun J. 5

Palau Municipal d'Esports de Badalona, Barcelona

Classification game 9th-12th place

4 August 1992
9:30
v

Boxscore

Angola	79–69	China
Scoring by half: 40–35, 39–34
Pts: Moreira 19; Rebs: Conceição 5 Asts: Macedo 6		Pts: Gong 16; Rebs: Hu 5 Asts: Sun F. 5

Palau Municipal d'Esports de Badalona, Barcelona

11th place game

6 August 1992
9:00
v

Boxscore

China	97–100	Venezuela
Scoring by half: 51–51, 46–49
Pts: Wu 25; Rebs: Wang 5 Asts: Sun F. 6		Pts: Olivares 32; Rebs: Herrera 6 Asts: Herrera 4

Palau Municipal d'Esports de Badalona, Barcelona

=== Women's tournament ===
Team roster

China women's national basketball team roster
Players
Coaches

Pos.	No.	Name	Age – Date of birth	Height	Club	Ctr.
G	4	Cong Xuedi	29 – 13 May 1963
	5	Li Xin	22 – 5 November 1969
	6	Liu Jun	22 – 15 October 1969
	7	Wang Fang	25 – 14 January 1967
	8	Zheng Dongmei	24 – 23 December 1967
	9	He Jun	23 – 3 March 1969
	10	Peng Ping	25 – 14 January 1967
C	11	Zheng Haixia	25 – 7 March 1967
	12	Zheng Xiulin	26 – 21 July 1966
C	13	Li Dongmei	22 – 6 November 1969
	14	Liu Qing	27 – 6 August 1964
	15	Zhan Shuping	28 – 24 April 1964

Head coach

- (China) Li Yaguang

Legend

- Club – describes last
  club before the competition
- Age – describes age
  on 26 July 1992

Group play

Pos	Team	Pld	W	L	PF	PA	PD	Pts	Qualification
1	United States	3	3	0	318	181	+137	6	Semifinals
2	China	3	2	1	205	226	−21	5	Semifinals
3	Spain	3	1	2	181	238	−57	4	Classification round
4	Czechoslovakia	3	0	3	183	242	−59	3	Classification round

Source: FIBA
Rules for classification: 1) points; 2) head-to-head points; 3) head-to-head goal average; 4) head-to-head number of points scored.

30 July 1992
20:00

Boxscore

China	66–63	Spain
Scoring by half: 27–31, 39–32
Pts: Peng 19; Rebs: 4 players 4 Asts: Li D., Li X., Liu J. 2		Pts: Ares 20; Rebs: Geuer 8 Asts: 5 players 1

Palau Municipal d'Esports de Badalona, Barcelona

1 August 1992
11:00

Boxscore

United States	93–67	China
Scoring by half: 47–33, 46–34
Pts: Dixon 19; Rebs: Orr 11; Asts: Edwards 8		Pts: Cong 18; Rebs: Zheng H. 11; Asts: He 6

Palau Municipal d'Esports de Badalona, Barcelona

3 August 1992
20:00

Boxscore

Czechoslovakia	70–72	China
Scoring by half: 31–38, 39–34
Pts: Němcová 15; Rebs: Buriánová 8 Asts: Bieliková 4		Pts: Peng 15; Rebs: Liu Q. 6 Asts: Li X. 9

Palau Municipal d'Esports de Badalona, Barcelona

Semifinals

August 5
13:00

Boxscore

Cuba	70–109	China
Scoring by half: 30–57, 40–52
Pts: Borrell 16; Rebs: Borrell 8 Asts: Vigil 2		Pts: Cong X, Li X 20; Rebs: Zheng H 5 Asts: Zheng D 5

Palau Municipal d'Esports de Badalona, Badalona

Gold medal game

August 7
22:00

Boxscore

(gold) Unified Team	76–66	China (silver)
Scoring by half: 43–35, 33–31
Pts: Zasulskaya 19; Rebs: Zasulskaya 6 Asts: Sumnikova, Antipova 4		Pts: Li D 12; Rebs: Li D 6 Asts: Li X 4

Palau Municipal d'Esports de Badalona, Badalona

== Boxing ==
Athlete	Event	Round of 32	Round of 16	Quarterfinals	Semifinals	Final	
Athlete	Event	Opposition Result	Opposition Result	Opposition Result	Opposition Result	Opposition Result	Rank
Liu Gang	Flyweight	Ávila (DOM); L RSC R2	Did not advance				
Zhang Guangping	Bantamweight	Zengli (ALG); L 0–4	Did not advance				
Chao Lu	Middleweight	Bye	Trendafilov (BUL); L RSC R1	Did not advance			
Bai Chongguang	Light heavyweight	Ko (KOR); L 4–18	Did not advance				

== Canoeing ==
Athlete	Event	Heats		Semifinals		Final	
Athlete	Event	Time	Rank	Time	Rank	Time	Rank
Zhao Xiaoli; Ning Menghua	Women's K-2 500 metres	1:43.07	2	1:42.86	4 Q	1:42.46	7
Ning Menghua; Wang Jing; Wen Yanfang; Zhao Xiaoli	Women's K-4 500 metres	1:36.15	1 F	Bye		1:41.12	5

== Cycling ==
Six cyclists, four men and two women, represented China in 1992.

=== Road ===
Athlete	Event	Time	Rank
Tang Xuezhong	Road race	4:35:56	39
Wang Shusen	Road race	4:35:56	64
Zhu Zhengjun	Road race	4:35:56	44
Li Wenkai; Tang Xuezhong; Wang Shusen; Zhu Zhengjun	Team time trial	2:12:38	15

=== Track ===
Sprint

Athlete	Event	Qualification		Round 1	Repechage		Round 2	Repechage 2	Quarterfinals	Semifinals	Final	
Athlete	Event	Qualification		Round 1	Round 1	Round 2	Round 2	Repechage 2	Quarterfinals	Semifinals	Final	
Athlete	Event	Time Speed (km/h)	Rank	Opposition Time Speed (km/h)	Opposition Time Speed (km/h)	Opposition Time Speed (km/h)	Opposition Time Speed (km/h)	Opposition Time Speed (km/h)	Opposition Time Speed (km/h)	Opposition Time Speed (km/h)	Opposition Time Speed (km/h)	Rank
Wang Yan	Women's sprint	12.154; 59.240	9	Haringa (NED), Razmaitė (LTU); L	Bye	—N/a			Ballanger (FRA); L, L	Did not advance		

Pursuit

Athlete	Event	Qualification		Quarterfinals	Semifinals	Final	
Athlete	Event	Time	Rank	Opposition Time	Opposition Time	Opposition Time	Rank
Zhou Lingmei	Women's individual pursuit	4:04.085	15	Did not advance			

Points race

Athlete	Event	Qualification			Final		
Athlete	Event	Laps	Points	Rank	Laps	Points	Rank
Li Wenkai	Points race	−1 lap	8	11 Q	same lap	1	20

== Diving ==
Men

Athlete	Event	Qualification		Final	
Athlete	Event	Points	Rank	Points	Rank
Lan Wei	3 m springboard	369.09	14	Did not advance	
Tan Liangde	3 m springboard	426.39	1 Q	645.57	2nd place, silver medalist(s)
Sun Shuwei	10 m platform	447.96	2 Q	677.31	1st place, gold medalist(s)
Xiong Ni	10 m platform	453.87	1 Q	600.15	3rd place, bronze medalist(s)

Women

Athlete	Event	Qualification		Final	
Athlete	Event	Points	Rank	Points	Rank
Gao Min	3 m springboard	309.75	3 Q	572.40	1st place, gold medalist(s)
Tan Shuping	3 m springboard	269.10	17	Did not advance	
Fu Mingxia	10 m platform	361.77	1 Q	461.43	1st place, gold medalist(s)
Zhu Jinhong	10 m platform	297.00	6 Q	400.56	4

== Fencing ==
15 fencers, 10 men and 5 women, represented China in 1992.

Individual
Pool stage

Athlete	Event	Group Stage						
Athlete	Event	Opposition Result	Opposition Result	Opposition Result	Opposition Result	Opposition Result	Opposition Result	Rank
Wang Haibin	Men's foil	Borella (ITA); L 2–5	Kiełpikowski (POL); L 1–5	Gregory (CUB); L 3–5	Bravo (ESP); W 5–3	Torrente (RSA); W 5–1	Álvarez (PAR); W 5–3	31 Q
Wang Lihong	Men's foil	Shevchenko (EUN); L 4–5	Sypniewski (POL); L 1–5	Kiss (HUN); L 4–5	Kim S-p (KOR); W 5–4	Guimarães (POR); W 5–1	Longenbach (USA); L 2–5	44 Q
Ye Chong	Men's foil	Weidner (GER); W 5–4	Grigoryev (EUN); W 5–1	Marx (USA); W 5–3	Kim Y-h (KOR); W 5–2	Torres (PHI); W 5–0	Tan (SGP); W 5–1	2 Q
Jia Guihua	Men's sabre	Szabó (HUN); L 1–5	Daurelle (FRA); L 3–5	Chiculiță (ROU); L 4–5	Zavieh (GBR); L 3–5	—N/a		38
Yang Zhen	Men's sabre	Becker (GER); L 2–5	Meglio (ITA); L 3–5	Olech (POL); L 4–5	Banos (CAN); W 5–2	Mullins (CRC); W 5–2	—N/a	28 Q
Zheng Zhaokang	Men's sabre	Nébald (HUN); L 4–5	Marin (ITA); L 0–5	Kiriyenko (EUN); L 4–5	Peinador (ESP); W 5–3	Torrente (RSA); W 5–1	Hashimoto (JPN); W 5–3	23 Q
E Jie	Women's foil	Stefanek (HUN); L 3–5	Szabo (ROU); L 2–5	Trillini (ITA); W 5–4	Castillejo (ESP); W 5–3	Giancola (ARG); W 5–1	Reyes (HON); W 5–0	16 Q
Wang Huifeng	Women's foil	Velichko (EUN); L 2–5	Funkenhauser (GER); W 5–4	Esquerdo (ESP); W 5–4	O'Neill (USA); W 5–2	Strachan (GBR); W 5–2	—N/a	10 Q
Xiao Aihua	Women's foil	Mincza (HUN); L 3–5	Czuckermann-Hatuel (ISR); W 5–3	Dobmeier (GER); W 5–2	Aubin (CAN); W 5–1	McIntosh (GBR); L 1–5	—N/a	21 Q

Elimination phase

Athlete	Event	Round 1	Round 2	Round 3	Round 4	Repechage				Quarterfinals	Semifinals	Final	
Athlete	Event	Round 1	Round 2	Round 3	Round 4	Round 1	Round 2	Round 3	Round 4	Quarterfinals	Semifinals	Final	
Athlete	Event	Opposition Result	Opposition Result	Opposition Result	Opposition Result	Opposition Result	Opposition Result	Opposition Result	Opposition Result	Opposition Result	Opposition Result	Opposition Result	Rank
Wang Haibin	Men's foil	Abdallah (EGY); W 2–0	Shevchenko (EUN); L 0–2	Did not advance		García (ESP); L 0–2	Did not advance						
Wang Lihong	Men's foil	Grigoryev (EUN); L 0–2	Did not advance										
Ye Chong	Men's foil	Bye	Kajbjer (SWE); L 1–2	Did not advance		Weidner (GER); W 2–0	Grigoryev (EUN); W 2–1	García (ESP); W 2–0	Gregory (CUB); L 0–2	Did not advance			
Yang Zhen	Men's sabre	Bye	Lamour (FRA); L 0–2	Did not advance		Peinador (ESP); W 2–0	Becker (GER); L 0–2	Did not advance					
Zheng Zhaokang	Men's sabre	Bye	Szabó (HUN); L 0–2	Did not advance		Chiculiță (ROU); W 2–1	Ducheix (FRA); W 2–1	Marin (ITA); L 0–2	Did not advance				
E Jie	Women's foil	Bye	Szabo (ROU); L 0–2	Did not advance		Meygret (FRA); L 1–2	Did not advance						
Wang Huifeng	Women's foil	Bye	Lee (KOR); W 2–1	Funkenhauser (GER); W 2–1	McIntosh (GBR); L 0–2	—N/a			Grigorescu (ROU); W 2–0	McIntosh (GBR); W 2–0	Modaine (FRA); W 1–2	Trillini (ITA); L 1–2	2nd place, silver medalist(s)
Xiao Aihua	Women's foil	Bye	Spennato (FRA); W 2–0	Velichko (EUN); L 1–2	Did not advance	—N/a	Stefanek (HUN); W 2–0	Sadovskaya (EUN); L 0–2	Did not advance				

Team

Athlete	Event	Group Stage			Quarterfinals	Semifinals	Final	
Athlete	Event	Opposition Result	Opposition Result	Rank	Opposition Result	Opposition Result	Opposition Result	Rank
Chen Biao; Lao Shaopei; Wang Haibin; Wang Lihong; Ye Chong	Men's foil	Italy; L 1–9	Poland; L 7–9	3	Did not advance			
Jia Guihua; Jiang Yefei; Ning Xiankui; Yang Zhen; Zheng Zhaokang	Men's sabre	Italy; L 5–9	Spain; W 8–7	2 Q	France; L 5–9	Germany; L 4–9	Italy; W 9–7	7
E Jie; Liang Jun; Wang Huifeng; Xiao Aihua; Ye Lin	Women's foil	France; W 8–6	United States; W 9–4	1 Q	Romania; L 7–8	Hungary; W 8*–8	France; L 5–9	6

== Gymnastics ==
=== Artistic ===
==== Men ====
Team

Athlete	Event	Qualification							
Athlete	Event	Apparatus						Total	Rank
Athlete	Event	F	PH	R	V	PB	HB	Total	Rank
Guo Linyao	Team	19.175	19.500 Q	19.350	19.025	19.425 Q	19.425 Q	115.900	8 Q
Li Chunyang	Team	19.450 Q	19.275	19.575	19.100	19.300	19.225	115.925	7 Q
Li Dashuang	Team	19.425	19.300	19.025	19.050	18.950	19.125	114.875	24
Li Ge	Team	19.150	19.175	19.400	18.925	18.975	19.250	114.875	24
Li Jing	Team	18.175	19.475 Q	19.650 Q	18.600	19.500 Q	19.550 Q	114.950	22
Li Xiaoshuang	Team	19.425 Q	19.450	19.625 Q	19.175 Q	19.375	19.400	116.450	6 Q
Total	Team	96.825	97.050	97.600	95.350	96.625	96.925	580.375	2nd place, silver medalist(s)

Individual finals

Athlete	Event	Apparatus						Total	Rank
Athlete	Event	F	PH	R	V	PB	HB	Total	Rank
Guo Linyao	All-around	9.650	9.650	9.675	9.800	9.600	9.550	57.925	6
Guo Linyao	Pommel horse	—N/a	9.875	—N/a				9.875	4
Guo Linyao	Parallel bars	—N/a				9.800	—N/a	9.800	3rd place, bronze medalist(s)
Guo Linyao	Horizontal bar	—N/a					9.812	9.812	4
Li Chunyang	All-around	9.700	8.875	9.600	9.750	9.700	9.575	57.200	18
Li Chunyang	Floor	9.387	—N/a					9.387	8
Li Jing	Pommel horse	—N/a	9.250	—N/a				9.250	7
Li Jing	Rings	—N/a		9.875	—N/a			9.875	2nd place, silver medalist(s)
Li Jing	Parallel bars	—N/a				9.812	—N/a	9.812	2nd place, silver medalist(s)
Li Jing	Horizontal bar	—N/a					6.425	6.425	8
Li Xiaoshuang	All-around	9.825	9.600	9.650	9.750	9.700	9.625	58.150	5
Li Xiaoshuang	Floor	9.925	—N/a					9.925	1st place, gold medalist(s)
Li Xiaoshuang	Rings	—N/a		9.862	—N/a			9.862	3rd place, bronze medalist(s)
Li Xiaoshuang	Vault	—N/a			9.731	—N/a		9.731	4

==== Women ====
Team

Athlete	Event	Qualification					
Athlete	Event	Apparatus				Total	Rank
Athlete	Event	V	UB	BB	F	Total	Rank
He Xuemei	Team	19.399	19.575	19.650	19.574	78.198	27
Li Li	Team	19.587	19.800 Q	19.524	19.625	78.536	20 Q
Li Yifang	Team	19.625	19.712	19.699	19.562	78.598	18
Lu Li	Team	19.624	19.824 Q	19.812 Q	19.474	78.734	15 Q
Yang Bo	Team	19.650	19.700	19.725 Q	19.662	78.737	13 Q
Zhang Xia	Team	19.399	19.625	19.412	19.337	77.773	35
Total	Team						

Individual finals

Athlete	Event	Apparatus				Total	Rank
Athlete	Event	V	UB	BB	F	Total	Rank
Li Li	All-around	9.750	9.850	9.837	9.825	39.262	14
Li Li	Uneven bars	—N/a	9.887	—N/a		9.887	8
Lu Li	All-around	8.737	9.612	9.912	9.812	38.073	34
Lu Li	Uneven bars	—N/a	10.000	—N/a		10.000	1st place, gold medalist(s)
Lu Li	Balance beam	—N/a		9.912	—N/a	9.912	2nd place, silver medalist(s)
Yang Bo	All-around	9.912	9.837	9.350	9.787	38.886	25
Yang Bo	Balance beam	—N/a		9.300	—N/a	9.300	7

=== Rhythmic ===
Athlete	Event	Qualification						Final						
Athlete	Event	Hoop	Rope	Clubs	Ball	Total	Rank	Qualification	Hoop	Rope	Clubs	Ball	Total	Rank
Bai Mei	Individual	9.150	8.525	8.975	9.125	35.775	29	Did not advance						
Guo Shasha	Individual	9.300	8.900	8.300	8.625	35.125	36	Did not advance						

== Judo ==
Men

Athlete	Event	Round of 64	Round of 32	Round of 16	Quarterfinals	Semifinals	Repechage				Final	
Athlete	Event	Round of 64	Round of 32	Round of 16	Quarterfinals	Semifinals	Round 1	Round 2	Round 3	Round 4	Final	
Athlete	Event	Opposition Result	Opposition Result	Opposition Result	Opposition Result	Opposition Result	Opposition Result	Opposition Result	Opposition Result	Opposition Result	Opposition Result	Rank
Chen Cailiang	–60 kg	Bye	El-Sayed (EGY); W	Koshino (JPN); L	Did not advance		—N/a	Wágner (HUN); L	Did not advance			
Gao Erwei	–65 kg	El-Agimi (LBA); W	Hassan (KUW); W	Quellmalz (GER); L	Did not advance		—N/a	Lorenzo (ESP); L	Did not advance			
Shi Chengsheng	–71 kg	Rasoanaivo-Razafy (MAD); W	Domingues (POR); W	Koga (JPN); L	Did not advance		—N/a	Vargas (ESA); W	Błach (POL); L	Did not advance		
Wang Nan	–86 kg	Bye	Ganbold (MGL); W	Gill (CAN); L	Did not advance		—N/a	Spijkers (NED); L	Did not advance			

Women

Athlete	Event	Round of 32	Round of 16	Quarterfinals	Semifinals	Repechage			Final	
Athlete	Event	Round of 32	Round of 16	Quarterfinals	Semifinals	Round 1	Round 2	Round 3	Final	
Athlete	Event	Opposition Result	Opposition Result	Opposition Result	Opposition Result	Opposition Result	Opposition Result	Opposition Result	Opposition Result	Rank
Li Aiyue	–48 kg	Marković (IOP); W	Kang (PRK); W	Tamura (JPN); L	Did not advance	—N/a	Savón (CUB); L	Did not advance		
Li Zhongyun	–52 kg	Bevilacqua (BRA); W	Grainger (AUS); W	Mariani (ARG); W	Muñoz (ESP); L	—N/a			Giungi (ITA); W	3rd place, bronze medalist(s)
Jin Xianglan	–56 kg	Pekli (HUN); W	Myrén (SWE); L	Did not advance						
Zhang Di	–61 kg	Ishii (BRA); W	Gu (KOR); L	Did not advance		Morris (NZL); W	Bell (GBR); W	Griffith (VEN); W	Eickhoff (GER); W	3rd place, bronze medalist(s)
Leng Chunhui	–66 kg	Park (KOR); W	Howey (GBR); L	Did not advance		—N/a	Rakels (BEL); L	Did not advance		
Zhuang Xiaoyan	+72 kg	Lee (GBR); W	Vicent (ESP); W	Gránitz (HUN); W	Sakaue (JPN); W	—N/a			Rodríguez (CUB); W	1st place, gold medalist(s)

== Modern pentathlon ==
One male pentathlete represented China in 1992.

Athlete	Event	Fencing (épée one touch)			Swimming (300 m freestyle)			Shooting (Air pistol)			Riding (show jumping)			Running (4000 m)			Total points	Final rank
Athlete	Event	Results	Rank	MP points	Time	Rank	MP points	Points	Rank	MP Points	Penalties	Rank	MP points	Time	Rank	MP Points	Total points	Final rank
Zhang Bin	Individual	28–37	49	694	3:40.5	61	1108	185	31	1045	124	31	976	15:06.5	64	847	4670	56

== Rowing ==
Athlete	Event	Heats		Repechage		Semifinals		Final	
Athlete	Event	Time	Rank	Time	Rank	Time	Rank	Time	Rank
Feng Feng; Sun Senlin; Huang Xiaoping; Xu Wuling; Li Jianxin (cox)	Men's coxed four	6:25.03	3 R	6:26.70	4 FB	—N/a		6:11.52	8
Yao Jianzhong; Li Zhongping; Feng Feng; Sun Senlin; Huang Xiaoping; Xu Wuling; Zheng Xianwei; Jiang Haiyang; Li Jianxin (cox)	Men's eight	5:38.98	4 R	5:43.55	2 SF	5:44.82	5 FB	5:44.01	11
Gu Xiaoli; Lu Huali	Women's double sculls	7:27.62	1 SF	Bye		6:58.09	1 FA	6:55.16	3rd place, bronze medalist(s)
Liu Xirong; He Yanwen; Cao Mianying; Zhou Shouying	Women's coxless four	6:51.87	4 R	6:45.16	1 FA	—N/a		6:32.50	4
Feng Lili; Yang Hong; Lu Huali; Gu Xiaoli	Women's quadruple sculls	6:40.38	4 R	6:38.70	3 FB	—N/a		6:48.90	7
Lin Zhiai; Ma Linqin; Pei Jiayun; He Yanwen; Liu Xirong; Liang Xiling; Cao Mianying; Zhou Shouying; Li Ronghua (cox)	Women's eight	6:14.99	2 R	6:13.80	2 FA	—N/a		6:12.08	5

== Sailing ==
Athlete	Event	Race										Net points	Final rank
Athlete	Event	1	2	3	4	5	6	7	8	9	10	Net points	Final rank
Jiang Chen	Men's Lechner A-390	17	21	27	14	5.7	22	16	22	~~30~~	14	158.7	14
Zhang Xiaodong	Women's Lechner A-390	3	10	11.7	11.7	5.7	5.7	0	10	8	~~14~~	65.8	2nd place, silver medalist(s)
Zhang Shunfang	Europe	~~29~~	24	26	27	25	24	20	—N/a			146	22

== Shooting ==
Men

Athlete	Event	Qualification		Final	
Athlete	Event	Points	Rank	Points	Rank
Du Long	10 m air rifle	582	34	Did not advance	
Jiang Rong	50 m rifle three positions	1163	10	Did not advance	
Jiang Rong	50 m rifle prone	596	11	Did not advance	
Meng Gang	25 m rapid fire pistol	585	11	Did not advance	
Pang Yongying	50 m rifle prone	590	39	Did not advance	
Shu Qingquan	10 m running target	573	8	Did not advance	
Wang Yifu	50 m pistol	565	5 Q	657	2nd place, silver medalist(s)
Wang Yifu	10 m air pistol	585	2 Q	684.8	1st place, gold medalist(s)
Xu Haifeng	50 m pistol	565	6 Q	652	7
Xu Haifeng	10 m air pistol	583	4 Q	681.5	4
Zhang Ronghui	10 m running target	561	18	Did not advance	
Zhang Yingzhou	50 m rifle three positions	1150	31	Did not advance	
Zhang Yingzhou	10 m air rifle	588	13	Did not advance	

Women

Athlete	Event	Qualification		Final	
Athlete	Event	Points	Rank	Points	Rank
Li Duihong	25 m pistol	586	2 Q	680	2nd place, silver medalist(s)
Li Shuanghong	10 m air pistol	380	9	Did not advance	
Wang Lina	25 m pistol	574	18	Did not advance	
Wang Lina	10 m air pistol	381	6 Q	479.7	4
Xu Yanhua	10 m air rifle	391	11	Did not advance	
Zhang Qiuping	50 m rifle three positions	579	10	Did not advance	
Zhang Qiuping	10 m air rifle	385	31	Did not advance	
Zhou Danhong	50 m rifle three positions	579	11	Did not advance	

Open

Athlete	Event	Qualification		Final	
Athlete	Event	Points	Rank	Points	Rank
Wang Zhonghua	Skeet	143	42	Did not advance	
Zhang Shan	Skeet	200	1 Q	223	1st place, gold medalist(s)
Zhang Xindong	Skeet	197	9	Did not advance	
Zhang Bing	Trap	194	8	Did not advance	
Zhang Yongjie	Trap	137	39	Did not advance	

== Synchronized swimming ==
Three synchronized swimmers represented China in 1992.

Women's solo

- Tan Min
- Guan Zewen
- Wang Xiaojie

Women's duet

- Guan Zewen
- Wang Xiaojie

== Tennis ==
Women's Singles Competition

- Li Fang
  - First Round — Lost to Brenda Schultz-McCarthy (Netherland) 5-7, 7-6, 4-6
- Chen Li-Ling
  - First Round — Lost to Mary Joe Fernandez (USA) 2-6, 3-6
