= Basketball at the 1992 Summer Olympics – Men's tournament =

Tournament details
- Host country: Spain
- City: Badalona
- Dates: July 26 – August 8, 1992
- Teams: 12 (from 5 confederations)
- Venue: Palau Municipal d'Esports de Badalona

Final positions
- Champions: United States (10th title)
- Runners-up: Croatia
- Third place: Lithuania
- Fourth place: CIS

Tournament statistics
- Games played: 46
- Top scorer: (Brazil) Oscar Schmidt (24.8 points per game)

The men's tournament of basketball at the 1992 Olympics at Barcelona, Spain began on July 26 and ended on August 8.

This was the first time that NBA players were eligible to play in Summer Olympics basketball, following a decision of FIBA in April 1989. Until 1992, only amateurs and players from professional leagues other than the NBA were allowed to play.

The United States, which was nicknamed "The Dream Team", won the gold medal after defeating Croatia in the final, with Lithuania winning the bronze medal by beating the Unified Team.

== Format ==
The twelve teams were split into two groups of six teams, and a single round-robin was held within each group. The top four teams from each group advanced to the knockout stage for the medals and the fourth place in the final rankings. The four losing teams from the first round of the knockout stage played another knockout stage to determine fifth through eighth place in the final rankings, and the four teams eliminated in the group stage played in another knockout stage to determine ninth through twelfth place in the final rankings.

Ties were broken via the following the criteria:

1. Head to head results

== Schedule ==
Legend
G	Group stage	¼	Quarter-finals	½	Semi-finals	B	Bronze medal match	F	Gold medal match

Sun 26	Mon 27	Tue 28	Wed 29	Thu 30	Fri 31	Sat 1	Sun 2	Mon 3	Tue 4	Wed 5	Thu 6	Fri 7	Sat 8	
G	G		G		G		G		¼		½		F	B

== Qualification ==
Means of qualification	Date	Venue	Berths	Qualified
Host nation			1	Spain
FIBA Africa Championship 1989	16–27 December 1989	(Angola) Luanda	1	Angola
1991 ABC Championship (Asia)	22 August – 1 September 1991	(Japan) Kobe	1	China
1991 FIBA Oceania Championship	1–7 June 1991	(New Zealand) Wellington and Palmerston North	1	Australia
1992 pre-Olympic basketball tournament (Europe)	22 June – 5 July 1992	(Spain) Bilbao, Granada, Murcia, Badajoz and Zaragoza	4	Lithuania
1992 pre-Olympic basketball tournament (Europe)	22 June – 5 July 1992	(Spain) Bilbao, Granada, Murcia, Badajoz and Zaragoza	4	Croatia
1992 pre-Olympic basketball tournament (Europe)	22 June – 5 July 1992	(Spain) Bilbao, Granada, Murcia, Badajoz and Zaragoza	4	Unified Team
1992 pre-Olympic basketball tournament (Europe)	22 June – 5 July 1992	(Spain) Bilbao, Granada, Murcia, Badajoz and Zaragoza	4	Germany
1992 Tournament of the Americas	27 June – 5 July 1992	(United States) Portland	4	United States
1992 Tournament of the Americas	27 June – 5 July 1992	(United States) Portland	4	Venezuela
1992 Tournament of the Americas	27 June – 5 July 1992	(United States) Portland	4	Brazil
1992 Tournament of the Americas	27 June – 5 July 1992	(United States) Portland	4	Puerto Rico
Total			12	

== Preliminary round ==
The top four places in each of the preliminary round groups advanced to the eight team, single-elimination knockout stage, where Group A teams would meet Group B teams.

=== Group A ===
Pos	Team	Pld	W	L	PF	PA	PD	Pts	Qualification
1	United States	5	5	0	579	350	+229	10	Quarterfinals
2	Croatia	5	4	1	423	400	+23	9	Quarterfinals
3	Brazil	5	2	3	420	463	−43	7 (Note: Head-to-head record: Brazil 1–0 Germany)	Quarterfinals
4	Germany	5	2	3	369	432	−63	7	Quarterfinals
5	Angola	5	1	4	324	392	−68	6 (Note: Head-to-head record: Angola 1–0 Spain)	9th−12th classification round
6	Spain (H)	5	1	4	398	476	−78	6	9th−12th classification round

Source: FIBA
Rules for classification: 1) points; 2) head-to-head points; 3) head-to-head goal average; 4) head-to-head number of points scored.
(H) Hosts
Notes:

26 July 1992
16:30
v

Boxscore

Angola	48–116	United States
Scoring by half: 16–64, 32–52
Pts: Conceição, Macedo 10; Rebs: Conceição 7 Asts: Conceição 2		Pts: Barkley 24; Rebs: Barkley 6 Asts: Johnson 10

Palau Municipal d'Esports de Badalona, Barcelona

26 July 1992
20:30
v

Boxscore

Germany	83–74	Spain
Scoring by half: 46–39, 37–35
Pts: Schrempf 26; Rebs: Gnad 20; Asts: Schrempf 4		Pts: Villacampa 21; Rebs: San Epifanio 7 Asts: Villacampa 2

Palau Municipal d'Esports de Badalona, Barcelona

26 July 1992
22:30
v

Boxscore

Croatia	93–76	Brazil
Scoring by half: 55–40, 38–36
Pts: Petrović 22; Rebs: Rađa 4 Asts: Petrović 5		Pts: Schmidt 25; Rebs: Vianna 9 Asts: Schmidt 2

Palau Municipal d'Esports de Badalona, Barcelona

27 July 1992
14:30
v

Boxscore

Angola	63–64	Germany
Scoring by half: 42–36, 21–28
Pts: Conceição, Sousa 18; Rebs: Conceição 6 Asts: Macedo 5		Pts: Schrempf 25; Rebs: Schrempf 15; Asts: Rödl, Schrempf 2

Palau Municipal d'Esports de Badalona, Barcelona

27 July 1992
20:30
v

Boxscore

Croatia	70–103	United States
Scoring by half: 37–54, 33–49
Pts: Petrović 19; Rebs: Rađa 8 Asts: Kukoč 5		Pts: Jordan 21; Rebs: Malone 5 Asts: Pippen 9

Palau Municipal d'Esports de Badalona, Barcelona

27 July 1992
22:30
v

Boxscore

Brazil	100–101	Spain
Scoring by half: 43–53, 57–48
Pts: Schmidt 44; Rebs: Victalino 10; Asts: Villas 3		Pts: Villacampa 25; Rebs: Jiménez 7 Asts: Herreros 5

Palau Municipal d'Esports de Badalona, Barcelona

29 July 1992
11:30
v

Boxscore

Brazil	76–66	Angola
Scoring by half: 42–36, 34–30
Pts: Schmidt 19; Rebs: Schmidt, Victalino 7 Asts: Maury 6		Pts: Conceição 17; Rebs: Conceição 9 Asts: Moreira 5

Palau Municipal d'Esports de Badalona, Barcelona

29 July 1992
20:30
v

Boxscore

United States	111–68	Germany
Scoring by half: 58–23, 53–45
Pts: Bird 19; Rebs: Malone 5 Asts: Jordan 12		Pts: Jackel, Schrempf 15; Rebs: Schrempf 8 Asts: Rödl, Schrempf 2

Palau Municipal d'Esports de Badalona, Barcelona

29 July 1992
22:30
v

Boxscore

Croatia	88–79	Spain
Scoring by half: 45–42, 43–37
Pts: Petrović 28; Rebs: Rađa 8 Asts: Kukoč 7		Pts: Villacampa 19; Rebs: Jiménez 7 Asts: Jofresa 5

Palau Municipal d'Esports de Badalona, Barcelona

31 July 1992
11:30
v

Boxscore

Spain	63–83	Angola
Scoring by half: 36–37, 27–43
Pts: Jiménez, Villacampa 16; Rebs: Andreu 9 Asts: Villacampa 3		Pts: Conceição 22; Rebs: Guimarães 10; Asts: Conceição 3

Palau Municipal d'Esports de Badalona, Barcelona

31 July 1992
20:30
v

Boxscore

Croatia	99–78	Germany
Scoring by half: 46–41, 56–37
Pts: Petrović 26; Rebs: Kukoč 7 Asts: Komazec, Kukoč 4		Pts: Jackel, Schrempf 25; Rebs: Schrempf 8 Asts: Rödl 5

Palau Municipal d'Esports de Badalona, Barcelona

31 July 1992
22:30
v

Boxscore

United States	127–83	Brazil
Scoring by half: 60–41, 67–42
Pts: Barkley 30; Rebs: Ewing 9 Asts: Drexler 10		Pts: Schmidt 24; Rebs: dos Santos 9 Asts: Maury 7

Palau Municipal d'Esports de Badalona, Barcelona

2 August 1992
9:30
v

Boxscore

Germany	76–85	Brazil
Scoring by half: 40–39, 36–46
Pts: Schrempf 27; Rebs: Gnad 10; Asts: Rödl 3		Pts: Villas 27; Rebs: Santos 11; Asts: Maury 6

Palau Municipal d'Esports de Badalona, Barcelona

2 August 1992
11:30
v

Boxscore

Croatia	73–64	Angola
Scoring by half: 27–38, 46–26
Pts: Komazec 22; Rebs: Komazec 6 Asts: Komazec 4		Pts: Conceição 24; Rebs: Conceição 7 Asts: Moreira 2

Palau Municipal d'Esports de Badalona, Barcelona

2 August 1992
22:30
v

Boxscore

Spain	81–122	United States
Scoring by half: 35–65, 46–57
Pts: Jiménez 23; Rebs: Andreu 7 Asts: Jiménez 6		Pts: Barkley 20; Rebs: Ewing 10; Asts: Pippen 9

Palau Municipal d'Esports de Badalona, Barcelona

=== Group B ===
Pos	Team	Pld	W	L	PF	PA	PD	Pts	Qualification
1	Unified Team	5	4	1	425	373	+52	9 (Note: Head-to-head record: Unified Team 1–0 Lithuania)	Quarterfinals
2	Lithuania	5	4	1	481	424	+57	9	Quarterfinals
3	Australia	5	3	2	432	396	+36	8 (Note: Head-to-head record: Australia 1–0 Puerto Rico)	Quarterfinals
4	Puerto Rico	5	3	2	445	440	+5	8	Quarterfinals
5	Venezuela	5	1	4	392	427	−35	6	9th−12th classification round
6	China	5	0	5	381	496	−115	5	9th−12th classification round

Source: FIBA
Rules for classification: 1) points; 2) head-to-head points; 3) head-to-head goal average; 4) head-to-head number of points scored.
Notes:

26 July 1992
9:30
v

Boxscore

Venezuela	64–78	Unified Team
Scoring by half: 16–34, 48–44
Pts: Estaba 21; Rebs: Walcott 4 Asts: Shepherd 5		Pts: Tikhonenko 18; Rebs: Volkov 7 Asts: Tikhonenko, Volkov 5

Palau Municipal d'Esports de Badalona, Barcelona

26 July 1992
11:30
v

Boxscore

China	75–112	Lithuania
Scoring by half: 26–55, 49–57
Pts: Sun J. 22; Rebs: Sun J. 4 Asts: Sun J., Gong 3		Pts: Kurtinaitis 31; Rebs: Sabonis 14; Asts: Marčiulionis 12

Palau Municipal d'Esports de Badalona, Barcelona

26 July 1992
14:30
v

Boxscore

Puerto Rico	76–116	Australia
Scoring by half: 31–57, 45–59
Pts: Gause 15; Rebs: de León 13; Asts: Carter 4		Pts: Bradtke, Gaze 20; Rebs: Loggins, Vlahov 7 Asts: Longley 5

Palau Municipal d'Esports de Badalona, Barcelona

27 July 1992
11:30
v

Boxscore

Venezuela	79–87	Lithuania
Scoring by half: 46–38, 33–49
Pts: Shepherd 17; Rebs: Herrera 8 Asts: Shepherd 5		Pts: Marčiulionis 27; Rebs: Sabonis 11; Asts: Marčiulionis 8

Palau Municipal d'Esports de Badalona, Barcelona

27 July 1992
16:30
v

Boxscore

Unified Team	85–63	Australia
Scoring by half: 35–51, 50–12
Pts: Volkov 15; Rebs: Belostenny 7 Asts: Bazarevich 7		Pts: Gaze 17; Rebs: Longley 5 Asts: Longley 2

Palau Municipal d'Esports de Badalona, Barcelona

27 July 1992
20:30
v

Boxscore

China	68–100	Puerto Rico
Scoring by half: 35–51, 33–49
Pts: Shan 22; Rebs: Shan 7 Asts: Song 3		Pts: Morales 15; Rebs: Rivas 4 Asts: Carter 12

Palau Municipal d'Esports de Badalona, Barcelona

29 July 1992
9:30
v

Boxscore

Venezuela	71–78	Australia
Scoring by half: 27–43, 44–35
Pts: Olivares 22; Rebs: Walcott 11; Asts: Estaba 4		Pts: Bradtke 16; Rebs: Bradtke 9 Asts: Gaze 7

Palau Municipal d'Esports de Badalona, Barcelona

29 July 1992
14:30
v

Boxscore

Unified Team	100–84	China
Scoring by half: 55–39, 45–45
Pts: Bazarevich 18; Rebs: Volkov 6 Asts: Bazarevich 6		Pts: Sun J. 22; Rebs: Wang 5 Asts: Adiljan 4

Palau Municipal d'Esports de Badalona, Barcelona

29 July 1992
16:30
v

Boxscore

Lithuania	104–91	Puerto Rico
Scoring by half: 50–43, 54–48
Pts: Sabonis 31; Rebs: Sabonis 13; Asts: Marčiulionis 9		Pts: Ortiz 20; Rebs: Ortiz 8 Asts: Carter, Rivas 5

Palau Municipal d'Esports de Badalona, Barcelona

31 July 1992
9:30
v

Boxscore

Venezuela	82–96	Puerto Rico
Scoring by half: 42–52, 40–44
Pts: Olivares 24; Rebs: Estaba 8 Asts: Estaba, Shepherd 4		Pts: López 19; Rebs: Mincy 14; Asts: López 7

Palau Municipal d'Esports de Badalona, Barcelona

31 July 1992
14:30
v

Boxscore

Australia	88–66	China
Scoring by half: 39–28, 49–38
Pts: Gaze 30; Rebs: Bradtke 7 Asts: Gaze, Longley 4		Pts: Hu 15; Rebs: Wang 5 Asts: Sun F. 6

Palau Municipal d'Esports de Badalona, Barcelona

31 July 1992
16:30
v

Boxscore

Lithuania	80–92	Unified Team
Scoring by half: 38–26, 42–66
Pts: Sabonis, Marčiulionis 21; Rebs: Sabonis 16; Asts: Marčiulionis 8		Pts: Tikhonenko 31; Rebs: Volkov 9 Asts: Volkov 4

Palau Municipal d'Esports de Badalona, Barcelona

2 August 1992
14:30
v

Boxscore

Venezuela	96–88	China
Scoring by half: 52–52, 44–36
Pts: Herrera 23; Rebs: Herrera 10; Asts: Walcott 5		Pts: Gong 18; Rebs: Shan 3 Asts: Sun J. 5

Palau Municipal d'Esports de Badalona, Barcelona

2 August 1992
16:30
v

Boxscore

Australia	87–98	Lithuania
Scoring by half: 46–45, 41–53
Pts: Gaze 16; Rebs: Bradtke 12; Asts: Gaze 3		Pts: Sabonis 26; Rebs: Einikis 10; Asts: Marčiulionis 8

Palau Municipal d'Esports de Badalona, Barcelona

2 August 1992
20:30
v

Boxscore

Puerto Rico	82–70	Unified Team
Scoring by half: 36–39, 46–31
Pts: Ortiz 16; Rebs: Ortiz 13; Asts: Ortiz 5		Pts: Vētra 25; Rebs: Belostenny 6 Asts: Volkov 5

Palau Municipal d'Esports de Badalona, Barcelona

== Knockout stage ==
Quarterfinals
A1	United States	115
B4	Puerto Rico	77
B2	Lithuania	114
A3	Brazil	96
B1	Unified Team	83
A4	Germany	76
A2	Croatia	98
B3	Australia	65

Semifinals
A1	United States	127
B2	Lithuania	76
B1	Unified Team	74
A2	Croatia	75

Gold medal game
A1	United States	117
A2	Croatia	85
Bronze medal game
B1	Unified Team	78
B2	Lithuania	82

=== Quarterfinals ===
4 August 1992
14:30
v

Boxscore

Croatia	98–65	Australia
Scoring by half: 41–31, 57–34
Pts: Petrović 25; Rebs: Rađa 11; Asts: Kukoč 11		Pts: Gaze 16; Rebs: Bradtke, Vlahov 5 Asts: Bradtke, Vlahov 2

Palau Municipal d'Esports de Badalona, Barcelona

4 August 1992
16:30
v

Boxscore

Unified Team	83–76	Germany
Scoring by half: 35–36, 48–40
Pts: Tikhonenko 26; Rebs: Volkov 14; Asts: Volkov 4		Pts: Schrempf 32; Rebs: Schrempf 10; Asts: Rödl, Schrempf 3

Palau Municipal d'Esports de Badalona, Barcelona

4 August 1992
20:30
v

Boxscore

Lithuania	114–96	Brazil
Scoring by half: 48–52, 66–44
Pts: Sabonis 32; Rebs: Sabonis 13; Asts: Marčiulionis 10		Pts: Villas 25; Rebs: Victalino 10; Asts: Maury 6

Palau Municipal d'Esports de Badalona, Barcelona

4 August 1992
22:30
v

Boxscore

United States	115–77	Puerto Rico
Scoring by half: 67–40, 48–37
Pts: Mullin 21; Rebs: Laettner 8 Asts: Pippen 8		Pts: Casiano, Ortiz 13; Rebs: Ortiz 8 Asts: Carter 4

Palau Municipal d'Esports de Badalona, Barcelona

=== Classification round 9th−12th place ===
9th to 12th place
1	Angola	79
4	China	69
3	Venezuela	81
2	Spain	95

9th Place game
Angola	75
Spain	78
11th Place game
China	97
Venezuela	100

Semifinals

4 August 1992
9:30
v

Boxscore

Angola	79–69	China
Scoring by half: 40–35, 39–34
Pts: Moreira 19; Rebs: Conceição 5 Asts: Macedo 6		Pts: Gong 16; Rebs: Hu 5 Asts: Sun F. 5

Palau Municipal d'Esports de Badalona, Barcelona

4 August 1992
11:30
v

Boxscore

Venezuela	81–95	Spain
Scoring by half: 40–46, 41–49
Pts: Herrera 26; Rebs: Estaba 8 Asts: Herrera 3		Pts: Herreros 25; Rebs: Andreu 9 Asts: Jofresa 4

Palau Municipal d'Esports de Badalona, Barcelona

==== 11th place match ====
6 August 1992
9:00
v

Boxscore

China	97–100	Venezuela
Scoring by half: 51–51, 46–49
Pts: Wu 25; Rebs: Wang 5 Asts: Sun F. 6		Pts: Olivares 32; Rebs: Herrera 6 Asts: Herrera 4

Palau Municipal d'Esports de Badalona, Barcelona

==== 9th place match ====
6 August 1992
11:00
v

Boxscore

Angola	75–78	Spain
Scoring by half: 39–41, 36–37
Pts: Conceição 21; Rebs: Conceição 7 Asts: Conceição 4		Pts: Jiménez 15; Rebs: Orenga 6 Asts: Arcega 4

Palau Municipal d'Esports de Badalona, Barcelona

=== Classification round 5th−8th place ===
5th to 8th place
1	Brazil	86
4	Puerto Rico	84
3	Australia	109
2	Germany	79

5th Place game
Brazil	90
Australia	80
7th Place game
Puerto Rico	86
Germany	96

Semifinals

6 August 1992
14:30
v

Boxscore

Brazil	86–84	Puerto Rico
Scoring by half: 43–49, 43–35
Pts: Schmidt 29; Rebs: dos Santos 7 Asts: Maury 3		Pts: Morales 16; Rebs: Rivas 5 Asts: Rivas 5

Palau Municipal d'Esports de Badalona, Barcelona

6 August 1992
20:30
v

Boxscore

Australia	109–79	Germany
Scoring by half: 52–44, 57–35
Pts: Gaze 30; Rebs: Bradtke 11; Asts: Smyth 6		Pts: Jackel 19; Rebs: Gnad 11; Asts: Schrempf 5

Palau Municipal d'Esports de Badalona, Barcelona

==== 7th place match ====
8 August 1992
20:00
v

Boxscore

Puerto Rico	86–96	Germany
Scoring by half: 46–45, 40–51
Pts: Carter 25; Rebs: Mincy 5 Asts: López 2		Pts: Schrempf 24; Rebs: Gnad 15; Asts: Schrempf 7

Palau Municipal d'Esports de Badalona, Barcelona

==== 5th place match ====
8 August 1992
11:00
v

Boxscore

Brazil	90–80	Australia
Scoring by half: 44–38, 46–42
Pts: Schmidt 23; Rebs: Victalino 12; Asts: Maury 11		Pts: Gaze 26; Rebs: Bradtke, Longley 6 Asts: Gaze, Longley 4

Palau Municipal d'Esports de Badalona, Barcelona

=== Semifinals ===
6 August 1992
16:30
v

Boxscore

Croatia	75–74	Unified Team
Scoring by half: 30–40, 45–34
Pts: Petrović 28; Rebs: Rađa 11; Asts: Kukoč 7		Pts: Volkov 20; Rebs: Volkov 6 Asts: Volkov 5

Palau Municipal d'Esports de Badalona, Barcelona

6 August 1992
22:30
v

Boxscore

Lithuania	76–127	United States
Scoring by half: 30–49, 46–78
Pts: Marčiulionis 20; Rebs: Sabonis 8 Asts: Marčiulionis 8		Pts: Jordan 21; Rebs: Robinson 8 Asts: Johnson 8

Palau Municipal d'Esports de Badalona, Barcelona

=== Bronze medal game ===
8 August 1992
13:00
v

Boxscore

Unified Team	78–82	Lithuania
Scoring by half: 33–39, 45–43
Pts: Tikhonenko 24; Rebs: Volkov 8 Asts: Sukharev 4		Pts: Marčiulionis 29; Rebs: Sabonis 16; Asts: Marčiulionis 3

Palau Municipal d'Esports de Badalona, Barcelona

=== Gold medal game ===
8 August 1992
22:00
v

Boxscore

Croatia	85–117	United States
Scoring by half: 42–56, 43–61
Pts: Petrović 24; Rebs: Rađa 6 Asts: Kukoč 9		Pts: Jordan 22; Rebs: Ewing 6 Asts: Johnson 6

Palau Municipal d'Esports de Badalona, Barcelona

Team details

Croatia	United States

SG	4	Dražen Petrović
C	14	Dino Rađa
SF	7	Toni Kukoč
C	9	Franjo Arapović
SG	5	Velimir Perasović
SG	13	Arijan Komazec
PG	12	Alan Gregov
PF	15	Aramis Naglić
PG	8	Vladan Alanović
C	10	Žan Tabak
C	11	Stojko Vranković
SG	6	Danko Cvjetićanin
Head Coach:
(Croatia) Petar Skansi

SG	9	Michael Jordan
PF	14	Charles Barkley
C	6	Patrick Ewing
SF	8	Scottie Pippen
PG	15	Magic Johnson
SF	13	Chris Mullin
SG	10	Clyde Drexler
C	5	David Robinson
PF	11	Karl Malone
PF	4	Christian Laettner
PG	12	John Stockton
SF	7	Larry Bird
Head Coach:
(United States) Chuck Daly

== Awards ==
1992 Olympic Basketball Champions

United States
Tenth title

== Final standings ==
Rankings are determined by classification games:

Rank	Team	Pld	W	L	PF	PA	PD
1st place, gold medalist(s)	United States	8	8	0	938	558	+380
2nd place, silver medalist(s)	Croatia	8	6	2	681	656	+25
3rd place, bronze medalist(s)	Lithuania	8	6	2	753	725	+28
4th	Unified Team	8	5	3	660	606	+54
Eliminated at the quarterfinals
5th	Brazil	8	4	4	692	741	-49
6th	Australia	8	4	4	686	663	+23
7th	Germany	8	3	5	620	710	-90
8th	Puerto Rico	8	3	5	692	737	-45
Eliminated at the preliminary round
9th	Spain	7	3	4	571	632	-61
10th	Angola	7	2	5	478	539	-61
11th	Venezuela	7	2	5	573	619	-46
12th	China	7	0	7	547	675	-128

== Cultural depictions ==
- Team USA Basketball, video game
- The Other Dream Team, documentary about the Lithuanian team
