= Basketball at the 1994 Asian Games =

- Date: 3–15 October 1994
- Nations: 10

Basketball was one of the many sports which was held at the 1994 Asian Games in Hiroshima, Japan between 3 October and 15 October 1994. China defeated Korea in the men's final en route to their 4th title, while Korea edged host Japan to claim their 2nd title in the women's final.

== Medalists ==
Event	Gold	Silver	Bronze
Men	China; Adiljan Suleyman; Gong Xiaobin; Hu Weidong; Liu Daqing; Liu Yudong; Shan Tao; Sun Jun; Wang Zhidan; Wu Naiqun; Wu Qinglong; Zhang Jingsong; Zheng Wu	South Korea; Chun Hee-chul; Hur Jae; Hyun Joo-yup; Jung Jae-kun; Kang Dong-hee; Kim Seung-ki; Kim Yoo-taek; Kim Young-man; Lee Sang-min; Moon Kyung-eun; Oh Sung-sik; Seo Jang-hoon	Japan; Osamu Abe; Satoru Furuta; Masaki Goto; Makoto Hasegawa; Hiroharu Kaneko; Manabu Miyake; Yukinori Miyata; Takehiko Orimo; Kenichi Sako; Satoshi Sekiguchi; Akifumi Yamasaki; Takeshi Yuki
Women	South Korea; Cho Hey-jin; Chun Eun-sook; Chun Joo-weon; Chung Eun-soon; Ha Sook-rye; Han Hyun-sun; Jung Sun-min; Lee Hee-joo; Park Hyun-sook; Song Yung-won; Yoo Young-joo; Youn Young-mi	Japan; Mikiko Hagiwara; Noriko Hamaguchi; Yuka Harada; Aki Ichijo; Hiroe Kakizaki; Takako Kato; Kikuko Mikawa; Chikako Murakami; Akemi Okazato; Taeko Oyama; Takami Takeuchi; Kagari Yamada	China; Li Dongmei; Li Xin; Liang Xin; Liu Jun; Ma Zongqing; Peng Ping; Sun Ying; Wang Fang; Zhang Weijuan; Zheng Dongmei; Zheng Haixia; Zheng Wei

== Medal table ==
Rank	Nation	Gold	Silver	Bronze	Total
1	South Korea (KOR)	1	1	0	2
2	China (CHN)	1	0	1	2
3	Japan (JPN)	0	1	1	2
Totals (3 entries)		2	2	2	6

== Final standing ==
=== Men ===
Rank	Team	Pld	W	L
1st place, gold medalist(s)	China	5	5	0
2nd place, silver medalist(s)	South Korea	6	5	1
3rd place, bronze medalist(s)	Japan	5	3	2
4	Philippines	6	3	3
5	Kazakhstan	6	3	3
6	Chinese Taipei	5	2	3
7	Saudi Arabia	5	1	4
8	Iran	6	2	4
9	United Arab Emirates	4	0	4

=== Women ===
Rank	Team	Pld	W	L
1st place, gold medalist(s)	South Korea	6	5	1
2nd place, silver medalist(s)	Japan	6	4	2
3rd place, bronze medalist(s)	China	6	5	1
4	Chinese Taipei	6	2	4
5	Kazakhstan	5	1	4
6	Thailand	5	0	5
