= Basketball at the 1990 Asian Games =

- Venue: Capital Indoor Stadium
- Date: 23 September – 6 October 1990
- Nations: 12

Basketball was one of the many sports which was held at the 1990 Asian Games in Beijing, China between 23 September and 6 October 1990. China won their 5th title in the men's tournament and Korea won their 2nd title in the women's tournament, in the fourth China-Korea finals showdown.

== Medalists ==
Event	Gold	Silver	Bronze
Men	China; Gong Luming; Gong Xiaobin; Li Chunjiang; Ma Jian; Shan Tao; Song Ligang; Sun Fengwu; Wang Fei; Wang Zhidan; Zhang Bin; Zhang Degui; Zhang Yongjun	Philippines; Allan Caidic; Hector Calma; Rey Cuenco; Yves Dignadice; Ramon Fernandez; Dante Gonzalgo; Samboy Lim; Chito Loyzaga; Ronnie Magsanoc; Alvin Patrimonio; Benjie Paras; Zaldy Realubit	South Korea; Choi Byung-shik; Hur Jae; Jung Jae-kun; Kang Dong-hee; Kim Hyun-jun; Kim Jin; Kim Yoo-taek; Lee Chung-hee; Lee Min-hyung; Lee Won-woo; Pyo Pil-sang; Seo Dae-seong
Women	South Korea; Cho Mun-chu; Choi Kyung-hee; Chun Eun-sook; Chung Eun-soon; Ha Sook-rye; Jeong Mi-kyeong; Lee Hyung-sook; Lee Kang-hee; Lim Ae-kyeong; Seo Kyung-hwa; Sung Jung-a; Yoo Jeong-ae	China; Hu Yun; Li Xin; Ling Guang; Liu Qing; Peng Ping; Wang Fang; Xu Chunmei; Xu Shuling; Xue Cuilan; Zhao Li; Zheng Haixia; Zheng Wei	Chinese Taipei; Chang Li-ching; Chang Yi-te; Chen I-lan; Chen Shu-chen; Chi Ching-lu; Chi Lin; Chien Wei-chuan; Chin Su-li; Ho Yung-wen; Lee Pi-hsia; Teng Pi-chen; Wu Hsiu-kuei

== Medal table ==
Rank	Nation	Gold	Silver	Bronze	Total
1	China (CHN)	1	1	0	2
2	South Korea (KOR)	1	0	1	2
3	Philippines (PHI)	0	1	0	1
4	Chinese Taipei (TPE)	0	0	1	1
Totals (4 entries)		2	2	2	6

== Draw ==
The teams were seeded based on their final ranking at the 1986 Asian Games.

Group A

- China (1)
- Hong Kong (8)
- ~~Iraq~~*
- Iran

Group B

- South Korea (2)
- ~~Kuwait (7)~~*
- Saudi Arabia
- ~~India~~*
- North Korea

Group C

- Philippines (3)
- Japan (6)
- ~~Syria~~*
- Pakistan

Group D

- ~~Jordan (4)~~*
- ~~Malaysia (5)~~*
- United Arab Emirates
- ~~Sri Lanka~~*
- Chinese Taipei

* Withdrew.

== Final standing ==
=== Men ===
Rank	Team	Pld	W	L
1st place, gold medalist(s)	China	7	7	0
2nd place, silver medalist(s)	Philippines	7	5	2
3rd place, bronze medalist(s)	South Korea	7	5	2
4	Japan	7	3	4
5	Chinese Taipei	5	3	2
6	United Arab Emirates	5	1	4
7	Iran	6	3	3
8	North Korea	6	1	5
9	Saudi Arabia	3	1	2
10	Pakistan	4	1	3
11	Hong Kong	3	0	3

=== Women ===
Rank	Team	Pld	W	L
1st place, gold medalist(s)	South Korea	6	5	1
2nd place, silver medalist(s)	China	6	5	1
3rd place, bronze medalist(s)	Chinese Taipei	6	4	2
4	Japan	6	2	4
5	North Korea	5	1	4
6	Thailand	5	0	5
