= Gymnastics at the 1992 Summer Olympics – Men's floor =

Men's floor at the Games of the XXV Olympiad
- Pictogram for Gymnastics
- Venue: Palau Sant Jordi
- Date: 29 July – 2 August 1992
- Competitors: 93 from 25 nations

Medalists
1st place, gold medalist(s)		Li Xiaoshuang	China
2nd place, silver medalist(s)		Yukio Iketani	Japan
2nd place, silver medalist(s)		Grigory Misutin	Unified Team

These are the results of the men's floor competition, one of eight events for male competitors in artistic gymnastics at the 1992 Summer Olympics in Barcelona. The qualification and final rounds took place on July 29 and August 2, 1992 at the Palau Sant Jordi.

== Results ==
=== Qualification ===
Eighty-nine gymnasts competed in the floor event during the compulsory and optional rounds on July 27 and 29. The eight highest scoring gymnasts advanced to the final on August 2. Each country was limited to two competitors in the final.

=== Final ===
Rank	Gymnast	Score
Gold medal	Li Xiaoshuang (CHN)	9.925
Silver medal	Yukio Iketani (JPN)	9.787
Silver medal	Grigory Misutin (EUN)	9.787
4	Yoo Ok-ryul (KOR)	9.775
5	Yutaka Aihara (JPN)	9.737
6	Vitaly Scherbo (EUN)	9.712
7	Andreas Wecker (GER)	9.687
8	Li Chunyang (CHN)	9.387
