= Gymnastics at the 1992 Summer Olympics – Men's parallel bars =

Olympic gymnastics event

Men's parallel bars at the Games of the XXV Olympiad
- Pictogram for Gymnastics
- Venue: Palau Sant Jordi
- Dates: 27 July – 2 August 1992
- Competitors: 93 from 25 nations
- Winning score: 9.900

Medalists
1st place, gold medalist(s)		Vitaly Scherbo; Unified Team
2nd place, silver medalist(s)		Li Jing; China
3rd place, bronze medalist(s)		Igor Korobchinski; Unified Team
3rd place, bronze medalist(s)		Guo Linyao; China
3rd place, bronze medalist(s)		Masayuki Matsunaga; Japan

The men's parallel bars competition was one of eight events for male competitors in artistic gymnastics at the 1992 Summer Olympics in Barcelona. The qualification and final rounds took place July 29 and August 2, 1992 at the Palau Sant Jordi. There were 93 competitors from 25 nations, with nations in the team event having 6 gymnasts while other nations could have up to 3 gymnasts. The event was won by Vitaly Scherbo of the Unified Team, the third time in four Games that a Soviet or former Soviet gymnast won the rings. Li Jing of China earned silver. There was a three-way tie for third, with Igor Korobchinski of the Unified Team, Guo Linyao of China, and Masayuki Matsunaga of Japan each receiving bronze medals. They were the first medals for China in the parallel bars.

== Background ==
This was the 18th appearance of the event, which is one of the five apparatus events held every time there were apparatus events at the Summer Olympics (no apparatus events were held in 1900, 1908, 1912, or 1920). Six of the eight finalists from 1988 returned: bronze medalist Sven Tippelt of East Germany, fourth-place finisher Kalofer Khristozov of Bulgaria, fifth-place finisher Marius Gherman of Romania, sixth-place finisher Curtis Hibbert of Canada, seventh-place finisher Sylvio Kroll of East Germany, and eighth-place finisher Boris Preti of Italy. Li Jing of China had earned gold at the last three world championships (1989, 1991, and 1992), sharing the top place on the podium twice with Soviet (or former Soviet) gymnasts, in 1989 with Vladimir Artemov (who was not competing in Barcelona) and in 1992 with Aleksey Voropayev (who was).

Puerto Rico and Slovenia each made their debut in the men's parallel bars; Russia and eleven other former Soviet republics competed as the Unified Team. The United States made its 16th appearance, most of any nation; the Americans had missed only the inaugural 1896 event and the boycotted 1980 Games.

== Competition format ==
Each nation entered a team of six gymnasts or up to three individual gymnasts. All entrants in the gymnastics competitions performed both a compulsory exercise and a voluntary exercise for each apparatus. The scores for all 12 exercises were summed to give an individual all-around score. These exercise scores were also used for qualification for the apparatus finals. The two exercises (compulsory and voluntary) for each apparatus were summed to give an apparatus score. The top eight gymnasts, with a limit of two per nation, advanced to the final. In a change from previous years, the preliminary score had no effect on the final; once the eight finalists were selected, their ranking depended only on the final exercise. Non-finalists were ranked 9th through 93rd based on preliminary score.

== Schedule ==
All times are Central European Summer Time (UTC+2)

Date	Time	Round
Wednesday, 29 July 1992		Preliminary
Sunday, 2 August 1992	23:00	Final

== Results ==
Ninety-one gymnasts competed in the parallel bars event during the compulsory and optional rounds on July 27 and 29. The eight highest scoring gymnasts advanced to the final on August 2. Each country was limited to two competitors in the final.

Rank	Gymnast	Nation	Preliminary			Final
Rank	Gymnast	Nation	Compulsory	Voluntary	Total	Final
1st place, gold medalist(s)	Vitaly Scherbo	Unified Team	9.900	9.825	19.725	9.900
2nd place, silver medalist(s)	Li Jing	China	9.750	9.750	19.500	9.812
3rd place, bronze medalist(s)	Ihor Korobchynskyi	Unified Team	9.800	9.800	19.600	9.800
3rd place, bronze medalist(s)	Guo Linyao	China	9.725	9.700	19.425	9.800
3rd place, bronze medalist(s)	Masayuki Matsunaga	Japan	9.575	9.775	19.350	9.800
6	Jair Lynch	United States	9.550	9.700	19.250	9.712
7	Andreas Wecker	Germany	9.700	9.675	19.375	9.612
8	Daisuke Nishikawa	Japan	9.725	9.625	19.350	9.575
