= Shan Tao =

Shan Tao may refer to:

- Shan-tao (a.k.a. "Shandao" and "Zendo"), the third patriarch of Pure Land Buddhism, Chinese monk and influential writer
- Shan Tao (basketball), basketball player
- Shan Tao (Taoist), one of the Seven Sages of the Bamboo Grove
