= Gymnastics at the 1992 Summer Olympics – Men's pommel horse =

Olympic gymnastics event

Men's pommel horse at the Games of the XXV Olympiad
- Pictogram for Gymnastics
- Venue: Palau Sant Jordi
- Dates: 27 July – 2 August 1992
- Competitors: 93 from 25 nations
- Winning score: 9.925

Medalists
1st place, gold medalist(s)		Vitaly Scherbo; Unified Team
1st place, gold medalist(s)		Pae Gil-su; North Korea
3rd place, bronze medalist(s)		Andreas Wecker; Germany

The men's pommel horse competition was one of eight events for male competitors in artistic gymnastics at the 1992 Summer Olympics in Barcelona. The qualification and final rounds took place on 27 July, 29 July and 2 August at the Palau Sant Jordi. There were 93 competitors from 25 nations, with nations in the team event having 6 gymnasts while other nations could have up to 3 gymnasts. For the third consecutive Games, the pommel horse ended in a tie for the gold medal. Belarusian Vitaly Scherbo (on the Unified Team) and North Korean Pae Gil-su shared the top place. It was North Korea's first medal in the event. Bronze went to Andreas Wecker of Germany.

== Background ==
This was the 18th appearance of the event, which is one of the five apparatus events held every time there were apparatus events at the Summer Olympics (no apparatus events were held in 1900, 1908, 1912, or 1920). Three of the eight finalists from 1988 returned: sixth-place finisher Daisuke Nishikawa of Japan and seventh-place finisher Sven Tippelt and eighth-place finisher Sylvio Kroll of East Germany (now competing for unified Germany). The world championships earlier in 1992 had resulted in a three-way tie between Li Jing (China), Vitaly Scherbo (Unified Team), and Pae Gil-su (North Korea).

Puerto Rico and Slovenia each made their debut in the men's pommel horse; some former Soviet Republics competed as the Unified Team. The United States made its 16th appearance, most of any nation; the Americans had missed only the inaugural 1896 pommel horse and the boycotted 1980 Games.

== Competition format ==
Each nation entered a team of six gymnasts or up to three individual gymnasts. All entrants in the gymnastics competitions performed both a compulsory exercise and a voluntary exercise for each apparatus. The scores for all 12 exercises were summed to give an individual all-around score. These exercise scores were also used for qualification for the apparatus finals. The two exercises (compulsory and voluntary) for each apparatus were summed to give an apparatus score. The top eight gymnasts, with a limit of two per nation, advanced to the final. In a change from previous years, the preliminary score had no effect on the final; once the eight finalists were selected, their ranking depended only on the final exercise. Non-finalists were ranked 9th through 93rd based on preliminary score.

== Schedule ==
All times are Central European Summer Time (UTC+2)

Date	Time	Round
Wednesday, 29 July 1992		Preliminary
Sunday, 2 August 1992	20:30	Final

== Results ==
Ninety-three gymnasts competed in the pommel horse event during the compulsory and optional rounds on 27 and 29 July. The eight highest scoring gymnasts advanced to the final on 2 August. Each country was limited to two competitors in the final.

Rank	Gymnast	Nation	Preliminary			Final
Rank	Gymnast	Nation	Compulsory	Voluntary	Total	Final
1st place, gold medalist(s)	Vitaly Scherbo	Unified Team	9.775	9.875	19.650	9.925
1st place, gold medalist(s)	Pae Gil-su	North Korea	9.700	9.775	19.475	9.925
3rd place, bronze medalist(s)	Andreas Wecker	Germany	9.675	9.875	19.550	9.887
4	Guo Linyao	China	9.700	9.800	19.500	9.875
5	M. Chris Waller	United States	9.650	9.775	19.425	9.825
6	Yoshiaki Hatakeda	Japan	9.600	9.800	19.400	9.775
7	Li Jing	China	9.650	9.825	19.475	9.250
7	Valery Belenky	Unified Team	9.750	9.900	19.650	9.250
