= Chung Eun-soon =

South Korean basketball player

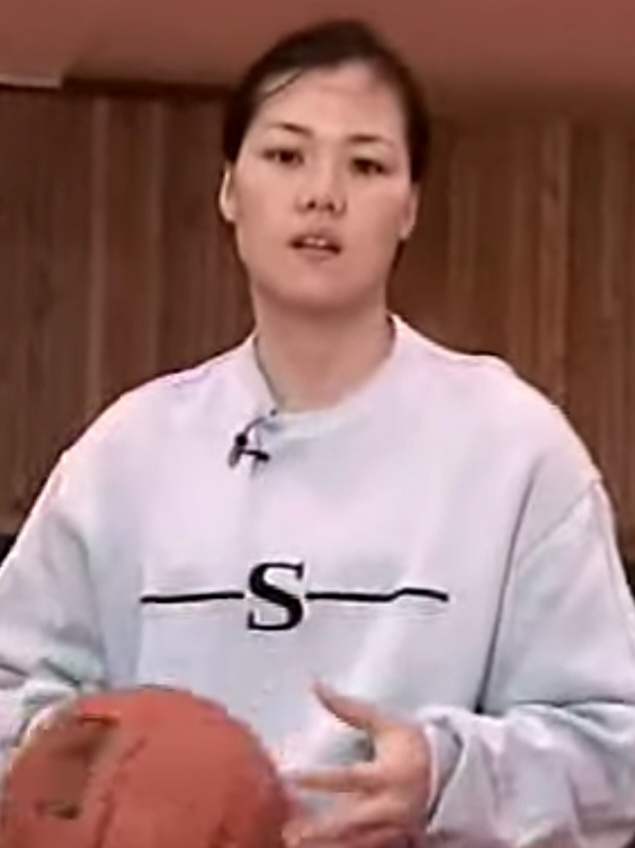

Korean name
- Hangul: 정은순
- Hanja: 鄭銀順
- RR: Jeong Eunsun
- MR: Chŏng Ŭnsun

Chung Eun-soon
Medal record

Women's basketball

Representing South Korea

Asian Games
Gold medal – first place	1990 Beijing	Team competition
Gold medal – first place	1994 Hiroshima	Team competition

Chung Eun-soon (born 18 July 1971) is a Korean former basketball player who competed in the 1996 Summer Olympics and in the 2000 Summer Olympics.
