= Gymnastics at the 1992 Summer Olympics – Men's rings =

Olympic gymnastics event

Men's rings at the Games of the XXV Olympiad
- Pictogram for Gymnastics
- Venue: Palau Sant Jordi
- Date: 28 July – 2 August 1992
- Competitors: 93 from 25 nations
- Winning score: 9.937

Medalists
1st place, gold medalist(s)		Vitaly Scherbo; Unified Team
2nd place, silver medalist(s)		Li Jing; China
3rd place, bronze medalist(s)		Andreas Wecker; Germany
3rd place, bronze medalist(s)		Li Xiaoshuang; China

The men's rings competition was one of eight events for male competitors in artistic gymnastics at the 1992 Summer Olympics in Barcelona. The qualification and final rounds took place on 29 July and 2 August 1992 at the Palau Sant Jordi. There were 93 competitors from 25 nations, with nations in the team event having 6 gymnasts while other nations could have up to 3 gymnasts. The event was won by Vitaly Scherbo of the Unified Team, the fourth time in five Games that a Soviet or former Soviet gymnast won the rings. Li Jing of China earned silver. There was a tie for third, with Andreas Wecker of Germany and Li Xiaoshuang of China each receiving bronze medals. It was the first medal for unified Germany since 1936, though East Germany had won gold and bronze in 1988.

== Background ==
This was the 18th appearance of the event, which is one of the five apparatus events held every time there were apparatus events at the Summer Olympics (no apparatus events were held in 1900, 1908, 1912, or 1920). Two of the eight finalists from 1988 returned: bronze medalist Sven Tippelt of East Germany and fourth-place finisher Kalofer Khristozov of Bulgaria. The reigning (1991) world champion was Grigory Misutin of the Unified Team. Wecker had placed second in both 1989 and 1991.

Puerto Rico and Slovenia each made their debut in the men's rings; some former Soviet Republics competed as the Unified Team. The United States made its 16th appearance, most of any nation; the Americans had missed only the inaugural 1896 rings and the boycotted 1980 Games.

== Competition format ==
Each nation entered a team of six gymnasts or up to three individual gymnasts. All entrants in the gymnastics competitions performed both a compulsory exercise and a voluntary exercise for each apparatus. The scores for all 12 exercises were summed to give an individual all-around score. These exercise scores were also used for qualification for the apparatus finals. The two exercises (compulsory and voluntary) for each apparatus were summed to give an apparatus score. The top eight gymnasts, with a limit of two per nation, advanced to the final. In a change from previous years, the preliminary score had no effect on the final; once the eight finalists were selected, their ranking depended only on the final exercise. Non-finalists were ranked 9th through 93rd based on preliminary score.

== Schedule ==
All times are Central European Summer Time (UTC+2)

Date	Time	Round
Wednesday, 29 July 1992		Preliminary
Sunday, 2 August 1992	21:30	Final

== Results ==
Rank	Gymnast	Nation	Preliminary			Final
Rank	Gymnast	Nation	Compulsory	Voluntary	Total	Final
1st place, gold medalist(s)	Vitaly Scherbo	Unified Team	9.900	9.900	19.800	9.937
2nd place, silver medalist(s)	Li Jing	China	9.875	9.775	19.650	9.875
3rd place, bronze medalist(s)	Li Xiaoshuang	China	9.900	9.725	19.625	9.862
3rd place, bronze medalist(s)	Andreas Wecker	Germany	9.900	9.850	19.750	9.862
5	Valery Belenky	Unified Team	9.875	9.800	19.675	9.825
6	Szilveszter Csollány	Hungary	9.875	9.800	19.675	9.800
7	Yukio Iketani	Japan	9.875	9.725	19.600	9.762
8	Kalofer Hristozov	Bulgaria	9.800	9.750	19.550	9.750
