= Wang Lihong =

Wang Lihong or Wang Li Hong may refer to:

- Wang Lihong (softball) (born 1970), Chinese softball player
- Wang Lihong (fencer) (born 1968), Chinese fencer
- Leehom Wang (born 1976), American-born singer-songwriter, record producer, actor and film director of Chinese descent based in Taiwan
- Lihong V. Wang, Chinese-born American biomedical imaging scientist
