= Gymnastics at the 1992 Summer Olympics – Men's vault =

Olympic gymnastics event

Men's artistic individual all-around at the Games of the XXV Olympiad
- Pictogram for Gymnastics
- Venue: Palau Sant Jordi
- Date: 29 July – 2 August 1992
- Competitors: 93 from 25 nations
- Winning score: 9.856

Medalists
| 1st place, gold medalist(s) | | Vitaly Scherbo; Unified Team |
| 2nd place, silver medalist(s) | | Hrihoriy Misyutin; Unified Team |
| 3rd place, bronze medalist(s) | | Yoo Ok-ryul; South Korea |

The men's vault competition was one of eight events for male competitors in artistic gymnastics at the 1992 Summer Olympics in Barcelona. The qualification and final rounds took place on July 29 and August 2 1992 at the Palau Sant Jordi. There were 93 competitors from 25 nations, with nations in the team event having 6 gymnasts while other nations could have up to 3 gymnasts. The event was won by Belarusian Vitaly Scherbo of the Unified Team, the first victory by a Soviet or former Soviet in the event since 1980. The silver went to Hrihoriy Misyutin, a Ukrainian also competing for the Unified Team. Yoo Ok-ryul gave South Korea its second consecutive bronze medal in the men's vault.

== Background ==
This was the 18th appearance of the event, which is one of the five apparatus events held every time there were apparatus events at the Summer Olympics (no apparatus events were held in 1900, 1908, 1912, or 1920). Three of the eight finalists from 1988 returned: silver medalist Sylvio Kroll of East Germany (now unified Germany), fourth-place finisher Deyan Kolev of Bulgaria, and seventh-place finisher Yukio Iketani of Japan. Yoo Ok-Ryul of South Korea had won the last two world championships (1991 and 1992), with Vitaly Scherbo and Ihor Korobchynskyi the runners-up.

Puerto Rico and Slovenia each made their debut in the men's vault; some former Soviet Republics competed as the Unified Team. The United States made its 16th appearance, most of any nation; the Americans had missed only the inaugural 1896 vault and the boycotted 1980 Games.

== Competition format ==
The event used a "vaulting horse" aligned parallel to the gymnast's run (rather than the modern "vaulting table" in use since 2004). Each nation entered a team of six gymnasts or up to three individual gymnasts. All entrants in the gymnastics competitions performed both a compulsory exercise and a voluntary exercise for each apparatus. The scores for all 12 exercises were summed to give an individual all-around score. These exercise scores were also used for qualification for the apparatus finals. The two exercises (compulsory and voluntary) for each apparatus were summed to give an apparatus score. The top eight gymnasts, with a limit of two per nation, advanced to the final. In a change from previous years, the preliminary score had no effect on the final; once the eight finalists were selected, their ranking depended only on the final exercise. Non-finalists were ranked 9th through 93rd based on preliminary score.

== Schedule ==
All times are Central European Summer Time (UTC+2)

| Date | Time | Round |
|---|---|---|
| Wednesday, 29 July 1992 | | Preliminary |
| Sunday, 2 August 1992 | 22:00 | Final |

== Results ==
Ninety-three gymnasts competed in the vault event during the compulsory and optional rounds on July 27 and 29. The eight highest scoring gymnasts advanced to the final on August 2. Each country was limited to two competitors in the final. No scores carried over from the preliminary to the final.

| Rank | Gymnast | Nation | Preliminary | | | Final |
| Rank | Gymnast | Nation | Compulsory | Voluntary | Total | Final |
|---|---|---|---|---|---|---|
| 1st place, gold medalist(s) | Vitaly Scherbo | Unified Team | 9.825 | 9.700 | 19.525 | 9.856 |
| 2nd place, silver medalist(s) | Hrihoriy Misyutin | Unified Team | 9.725 | 9.850 | 19.575 | 9.781 |
| 3rd place, bronze medalist(s) | Yoo Ok-Ryul | South Korea | 9.750 | 9.750 | 19.500 | 9.762 |
| 4 | Li Xiaoshuang | China | 9.475 | 9.700 | 19.175 | 9.731 |
| 5 | Zoltán Supola | Hungary | 9.700 | 9.550 | 19.250 | 9.674 |
| 6 | Sylvio Kroll | Germany | 9.575 | 9.675 | 19.250 | 9.662 |
| 7 | Szilveszter Csollány | Hungary | 9.650 | 9.550 | 19.200 | 9.524 |
| 8 | Yutaka Aihara | Japan | 9.575 | 9.625 | 19.200 | 9.450 |
