= Gymnastics at the 1992 Summer Olympics – Women's uneven bars =

Women's uneven bars at the Games of the XXV Olympiad
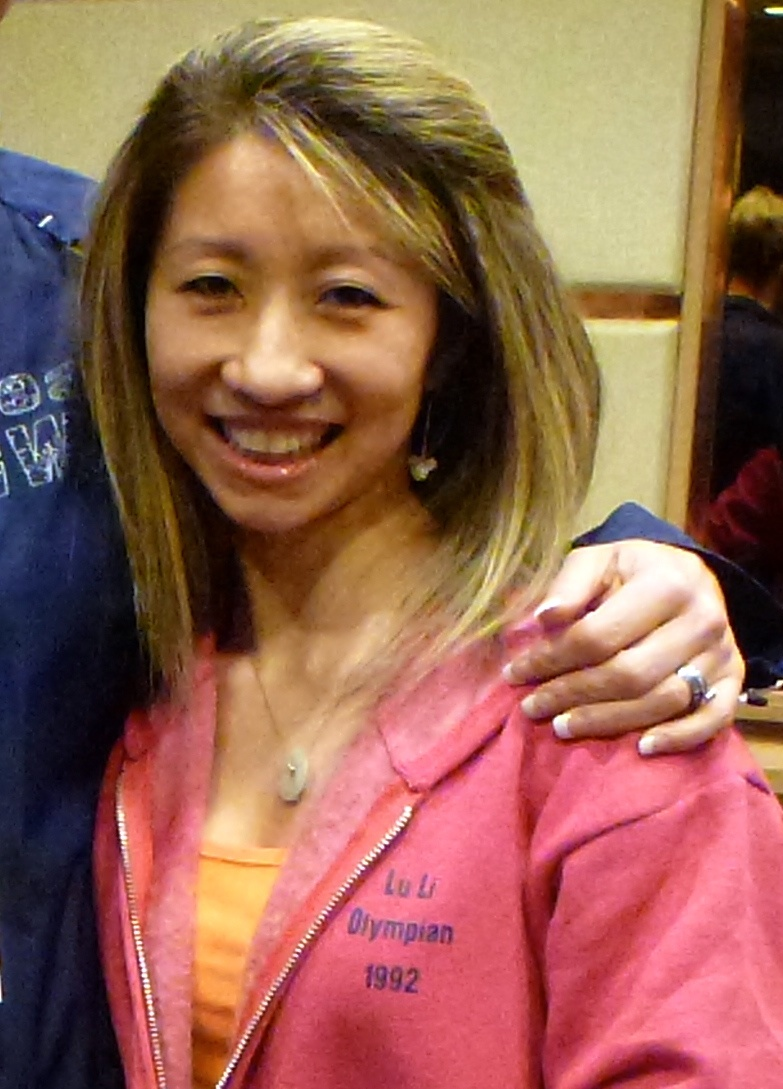
- Gold medalist Lu Li (2013)
- Venue: Palau Sant Jordi
- Date: 28 July – 1 August 1992
- Competitors: 92 from 24 nations

Medalists
1st place, gold medalist(s)		Lu Li	China
2nd place, silver medalist(s)		Tatiana Gutsu	Unified Team
3rd place, bronze medalist(s)		Shannon Miller	United States

These are the results of the women's uneven bars competition, one of six events for female competitors in artistic gymnastics at the 1992 Summer Olympics in Barcelona. The qualification and final rounds took place on July 28 and August 1, 1992 at the Palau Sant Jordi.

== Results ==
=== Qualification ===
Ninety-one gymnasts competed in the uneven bars event during the compulsory and optional rounds on July 26 and 28. The eight highest scoring gymnasts advanced to the final on August 1. Each country was limited to two competitors in the final.

Rank	Gymnast	Score
1	Tatiana Gutsu (EUN)	19.899
2	Kim Gwang Suk (PRK)	19.875
3	Lavinia Miloșovici (ROM)	19.862
3	Shannon Miller (USA)	19.862
5	Mirela Paşca (ROM)	19.837
6	Lu Li (CHN)	19.824
7	Cristina Fraguas (ESP)	19.812
8	Li Li (CHN)	19.800

=== Final ===
Rank	Gymnast	Score
Gold medal	Lu Li (CHN)	10.000
Silver medal	Tatiana Gutsu (EUN)	9.975
Bronze medal	Shannon Miller (USA)	9.962
4	Lavinia Miloșovici (ROM)	9.912
4	Kim Gwang Suk (PRK)	9.912
4	Mirela Paşca (ROM)	9.912
7	Cristina Fraguas (ESP)	9.900
8	Li Li (CHN)	9.887
