= Du Long =

Chinese sport shooter (born 1964)

Du Long (born 17 February 1964) is a Chinese sport shooter who competed in the 1992 Summer Olympics.
