= Li Xin (basketball) =

Chinese basketball player and coach

Medal record

Women's basketball

Representing China

Olympic Games
Silver medal – second place	1992 Barcelona	Team competition

Asian Games
Silver medal – second place	1990 Beijing	Team competition
Bronze medal – third place	1994 Hiroshima	Team competition

Li Xin (Chinese: 李昕; pinyin: Lǐ Xīn; born 5 November 1969 in Benxi, Liaoning) is a Chinese women's basketball coach and former international player. She won a silver medal with the Chinese women's national basketball team at the 1992 Barcelona Olympics.

In 1998, the newly promoted Beijing Olympians hired Li as their head coach for their debut season in the Chinese Basketball Association. She thus became the first ever female head coach in the CBA, but she was fired after only five games and replaced by Mike McGee, a former player of the Los Angeles Lakers, who then became the first ever foreign head coach in the CBA. The Olympians finished fourth and lost in the semi-finals to the Bayi Rockets in the 1998–99 season.
