= Palau Municipal d'Esports de Badalona =

Arena in Badalona, Catalonia

- Pavelló Olímpic de Badalona
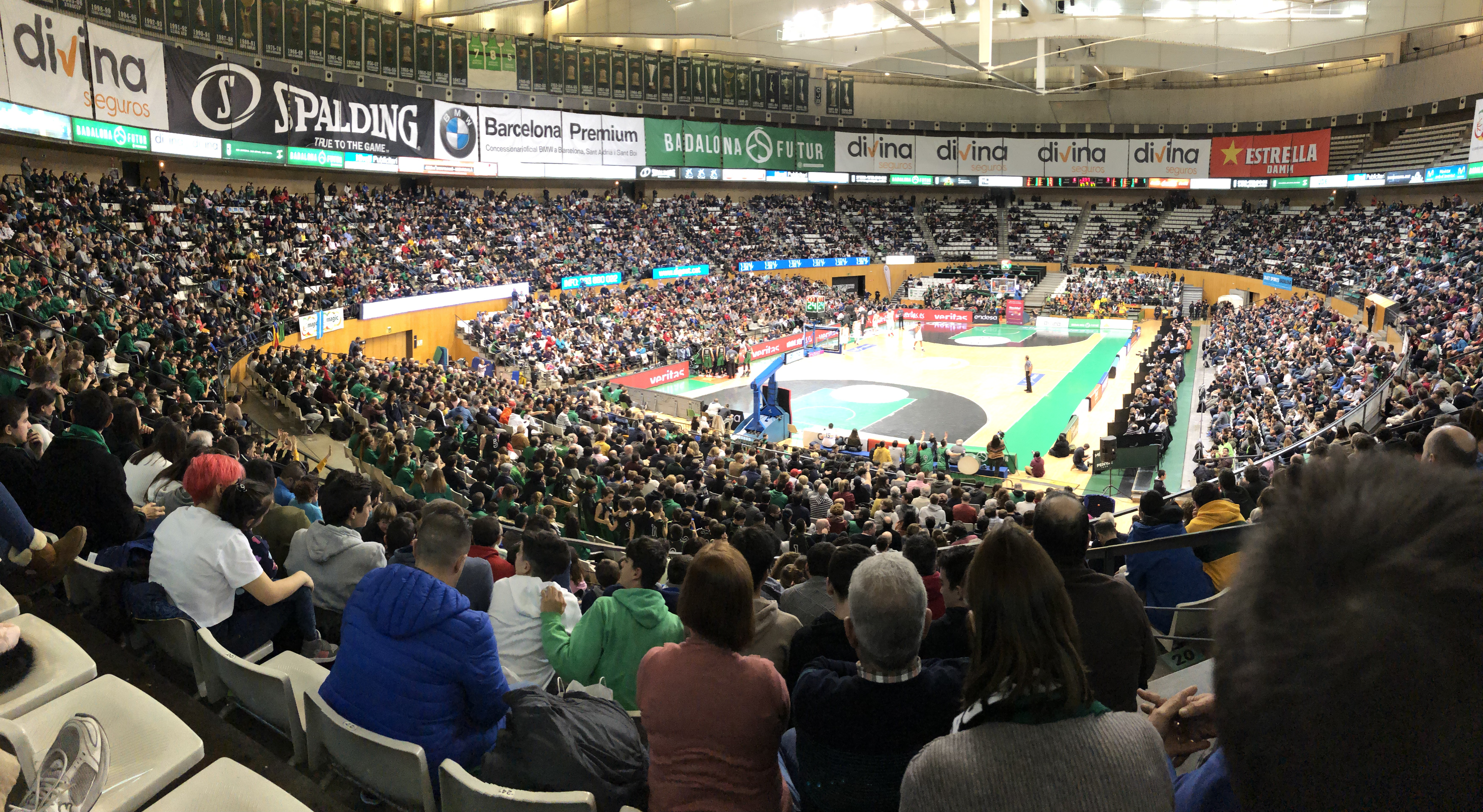
- Interactive map of Palau Municipal d'Esports de Badalona
- Location: Av. Alfons XIII, s/n Badalona, Spain 08921
- Coordinates: 41°26′32.69″N 2°13′55.72″E
- Owner: City of Badalona
- Capacity: Basketball: 12,760
- Public transit: at Gorg

Construction
- Groundbreaking: 1990
- Opened: 1991
- Cost: 35 million EUR
- Architects: Esteve Bonell and Francesc Rius

Tenant
- Joventut de Badalona

Palau Municipal d'Esports de Badalona (also known as the Pavelló Olímpic de Badalona) is an arena in the Gorg neighborhood of Badalona, Catalonia, Spain. The arena holds 12,760 people, and it is primarily used for basketball. It is also used as the venue for music concerts and other municipal events.

It is also the home arena of Joventut de Badalona, one of the most successful professional basketball teams in Spain. Before the Pavelló Olímpic was built, the 3,300-seat Pavelló Club Joventut Badalona hosted the city basketball games and most of the other indoor sports.

== History ==
The arena was inaugurated on September 17, 1991 with an exhibition game between Joventut and Greek club Aris Thessaloniki.

In 1992, it hosted a basketball game between Catalonia and Croatia; the Croatians won by 118-82 led with 30 points of Toni Kukoč and 21 points of Dražen Petrović.

The arena hosted the basketball tournament of the 1992 Summer Olympics. It was designed by the architects Esteve Bonell and Francesc Rius, who won the 1992 European Union Prize for Contemporary Architecture for this building.

On 14 March 2025, the arena hosted an episode of WWE SmackDown, marking the first SmackDown episode to broadcast from Spain.

In January 2026, the arena was selected to host the 2026 Basketball Champions League Final Four.

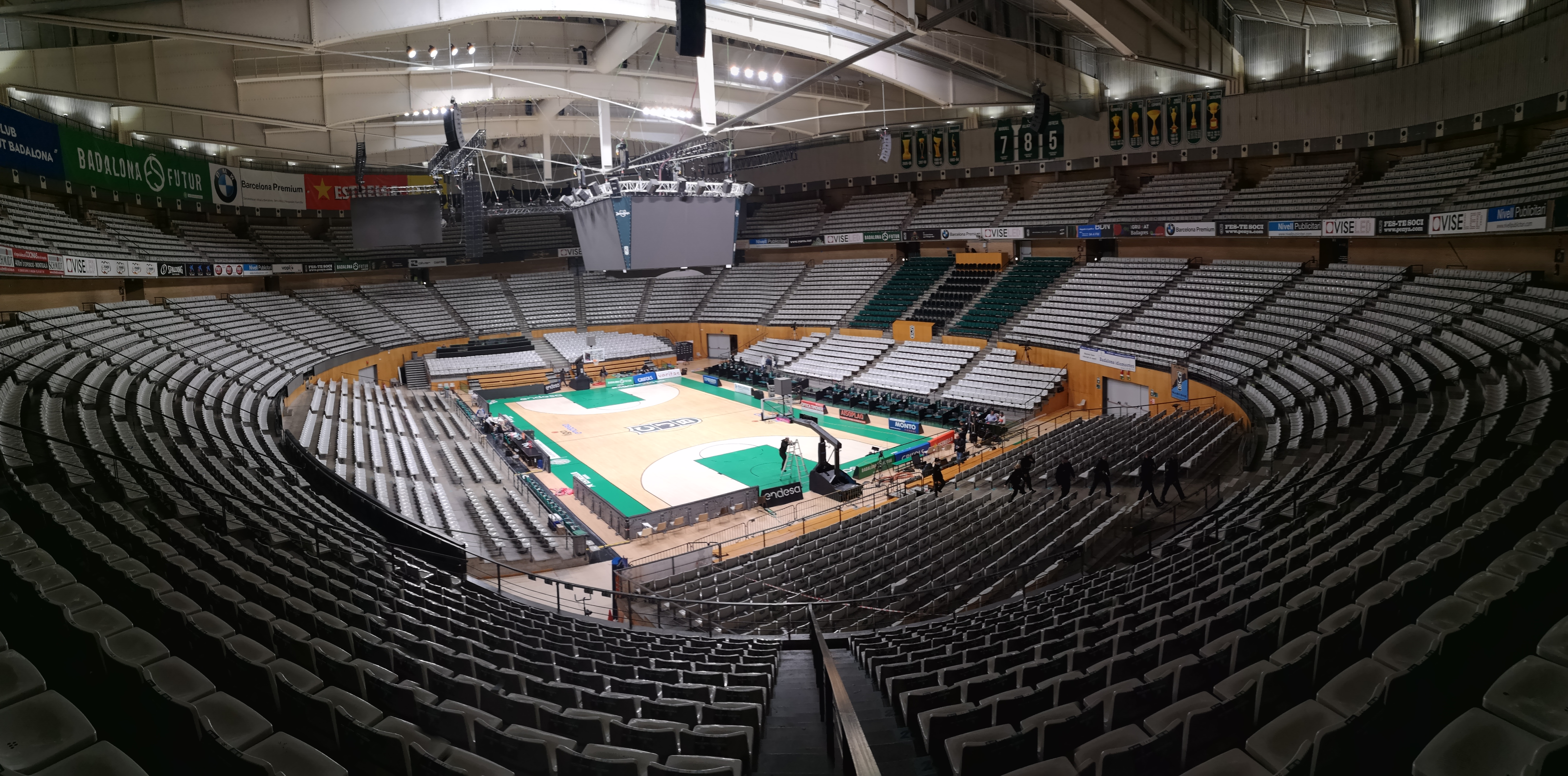
The interior of the arena in 2022

== Transportation ==
The closest Barcelona Metro station is Gorg, served by lines L2 and L10. Gorg is also served by the Trambesòs system tram line T5.

== Concerts ==
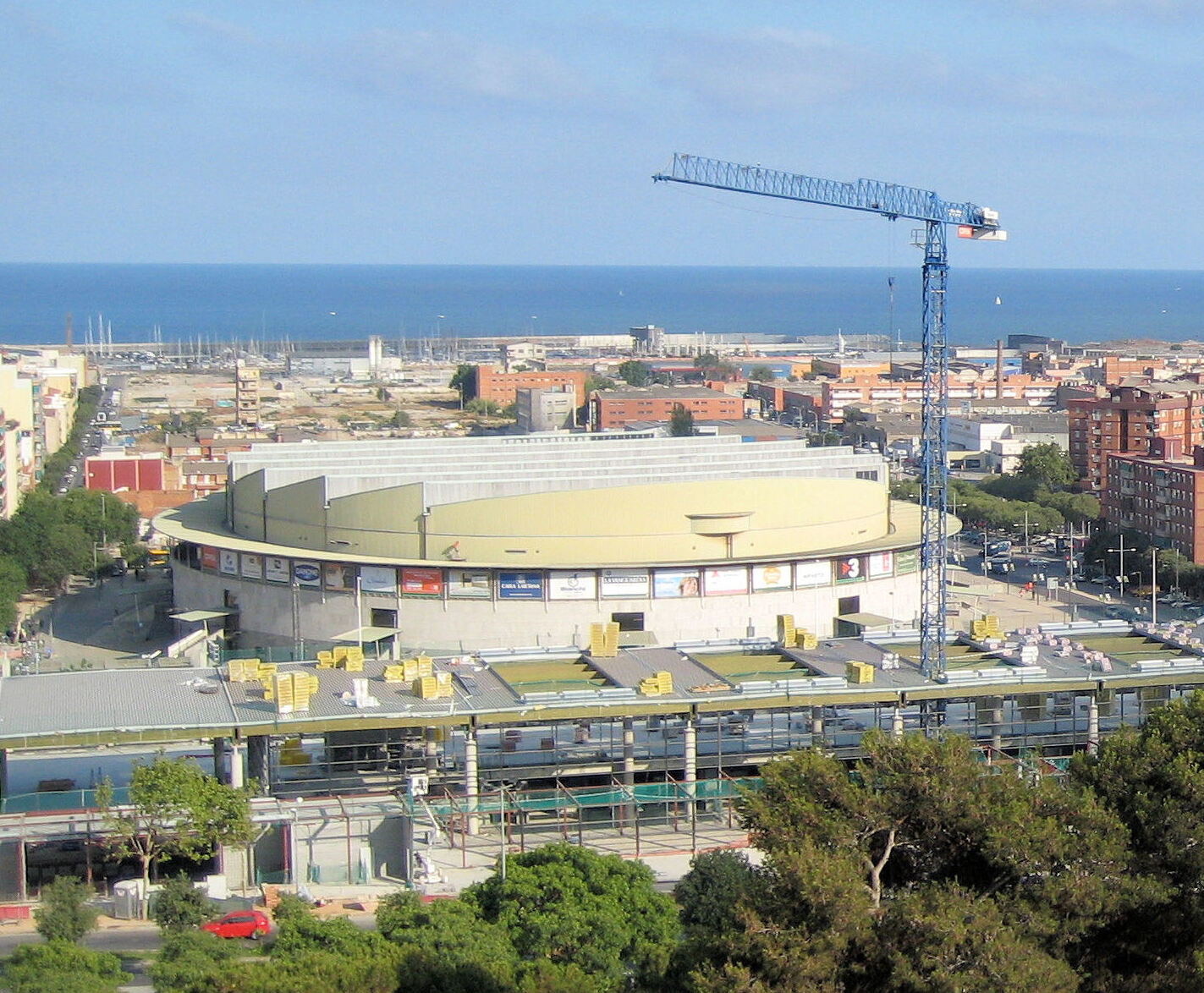
Outside view

Date	Act(s)	Tour
12 October 2012	Romeo Santos	The King Stays King
16 November 2012	Jason Mraz	Tour is a Four Letter Word
22 May 2013	One Direction	Take Me Home Tour
31 October 2013	Thirty Seconds to Mars	Love Lust Faith + Dreams
14 November 2013	Bruno Mars	The Moonshine Jungle Tour
16 November 2013	Arctic Monkeys	AM Tour
25 November 2013	Avenged Sevenfold	Hail to the King
16 December 2021	Jhay Cortez	
7 May 2022	Ghost	Imperatour
25 June 2022	Bizarrap	
13 November 2022	Okean Elzy	
26 November 2023	Thomas Anders	
4 May 2024	Zemfira	
28 May 2024	J Balvin	Que Bueno Volver a Verte Tour
14 December 2024	Natos y Waor	
17 May 2025	JC Reyes	
1 October 2026	Evanescence	

== See also ==
- List of indoor arenas in Spain
