= Zheng Dongmei =

Chinese basketball player

Medal record

Women's basketball

Representing China

Olympic Games
Silver medal – second place	1992 Barcelona	Team competition

Asian Games
Bronze medal – third place	1994 Hiroshima	Team competition
Silver medal – second place	1998 Bangkok	Team competition

Zheng Dongmei (simplified Chinese: 郑冬梅; traditional Chinese: 鄭冬梅; pinyin: Zhèng Dōngméi; born 23 December 1967) is a Chinese former basketball player who competed in the 1992 Summer Olympics and in the 1996 Summer Olympics.
