= Lu Li =

Chinese gymnast

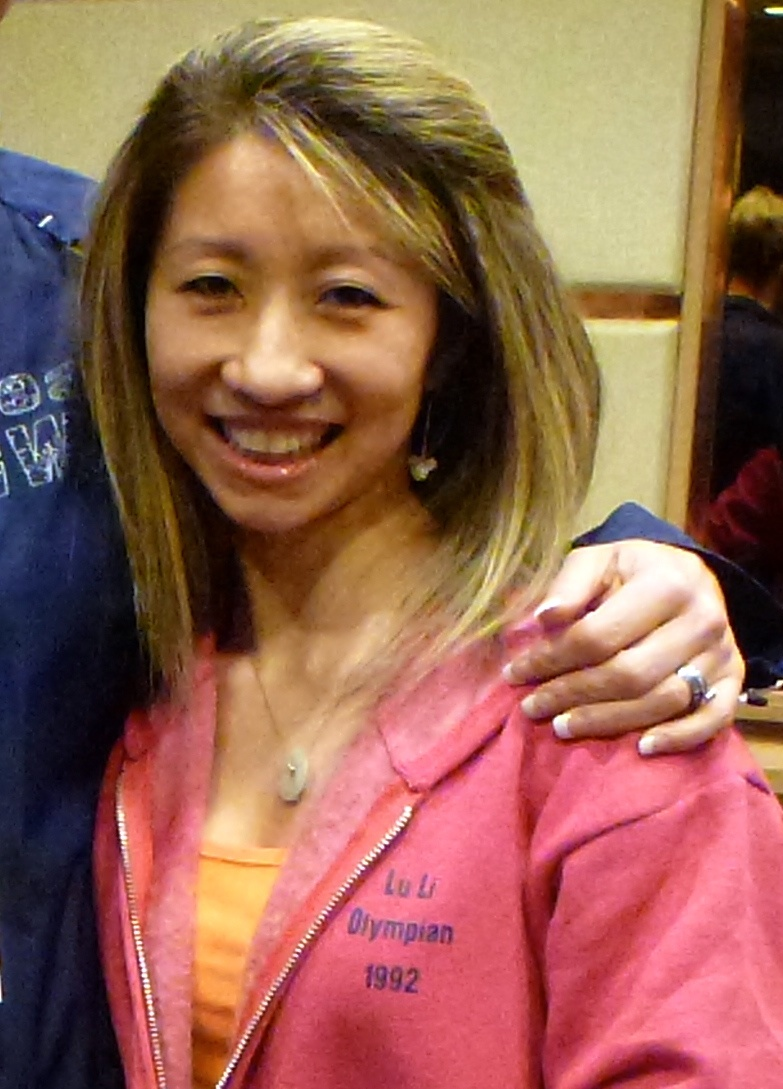
- Li in 2013

Personal information
- Nickname: Li Li
- Born: August 30, 1976 (age 50) Changsha, Hunan, China
- Height: 4 ft 11 in (150 cm)
- Spouse: Guennadi Komissarov

Gymnastics career
- Discipline: Women's artistic gymnastics
- Country represented: China
- Assistant coach: Black Hills Gymnastics
- Retired: 1993
Medal record
Women's artistic gymnastics
Representing China
Olympic Games
Gold medal – first place	1992 Barcelona	Uneven bars
Silver medal – second place	1992 Barcelona	Balance beam
National Games
Gold medal – first place	1993 Beijing	Uneven bars

Lu Li (simplified Chinese: 陆莉; traditional Chinese: 陸莉; pinyin: Lù Lì; born August 30, 1976) is a Chinese gymnast.

Lu made the Chinese national team in late 1991. However, liver illness almost prevented her from competing in the Olympic Games. In April 1992, just a few months before the Barcelona Games, she made her international debut at the World Championships in Paris, where her highly innovative uneven bars routine caught the attention of the gymnastics world.

Lu is best known for her gold medal on the uneven bars in the 1992 Summer Olympics in Barcelona. She won this with a perfect 10, which she achieved the same night as Lavinia Miloșovici also scored a perfect 10. Lu Li and Lavinia Miloșovici remain the last two people to score perfect 10s in Olympic competition to date. Lu Li also won a silver on the beam in the same games (tied with American Shannon Miller with a score of 9.912). Lu had troubles on her beam performance in the all-round competition, and placed a disappointing 34th.

Lu competed in the 1993 Chinese National Games and won the uneven bars title (tied with Luo Li, who would go on to win the 1994 World Championships in Brisbane). She retired shortly thereafter.

In 2000, Lu Li moved to California and was a coach there. She married Kim David Gussenhoven and has a son named JD. She moved to North Carolina in 2007, still as a coach. In 2009, Lu Li moved to Stockton, California and coached at Champion Gymnastics Academy. On September 1, 2009, Li, Kim, and JD moved to Washington and she was hired to coach at Emerald City Gymnastics in Redmond. Recently, she has started coaching gymnasts in Gig Harbor. Li then coached at Tech Gymnastics (formerly Eastside Gymnastics Academy) in Woodinville, WA. Currently Li coaches at Black Hills Gymnastics in Lacey, WA.
