= Chen Biao (fencer) =

Chinese fencer

Personal information
- Born: 9 February 1971 (age 55)

Sport
- Sport: Fencing

Chen Biao (Chinese: 陳 飚; born 9 February 1971) is a Chinese fencer. He competed in the team foil event at the 1992 Summer Olympics.
