= Li Dongmei =

Chinese basketball player

Medal record

Women's basketball

Representing China

Olympic Games
Silver medal – second place	1992 Barcelona	Team competition

Asian Games
Bronze medal – third place	1994 Hiroshima	Team competition

Li Dongmei (Chinese: 李冬梅; pinyin: Lǐ Dōngméi; born 6 November 1969) is a Chinese former basketball player who competed in the 1992 Summer Olympics and in the 1996 Summer Olympics.
