= Liu Qing (basketball) =

Chinese basketball player

Medal record

Women's basketball

Representing China

Olympic Games
Silver medal – second place	1992 Barcelona	Team competition
Bronze medal – third place	1984 Los Angeles	Team competition

Asian Games
Gold medal – first place	1982 New Delhi	Team competition
Gold medal – first place	1986 Seoul	Team competition
Silver medal – second place	1990 Beijing	Team competition

Liu Qing (Chinese: 柳青; pinyin: Liǔ Qīng; born 6 August 1964) is a Chinese former basketball player who competed in the 1984 Summer Olympics, in the 1988 Summer Olympics, and in the 1992 Summer Olympics.
