= Vitaly Scherbo =

Belarusian gymnast (born 1972)

- Виталий Щербо
- Full name: Vitaly Venediktovich Scherbo
- Born: 13 January 1972 (age 54) Minsk, Byelorussian SSR, Soviet Union
- Height: 169 cm (5 ft 7 in)

Gymnastics career
- Discipline: Men's artistic gymnastics
- Country represented: Belarus
- Former countries represented: CIS ( Unified Team), Soviet Union
Medal record
Event	1st	2nd	3rd
Olympic Games	6	0	4
World Championships	12	7	4
European Championships	9	5	2
Universiade	3	3	2
Goodwill Games	4	1	0
World Cup Final	2	1	1
Total	36	17	13
Olympic Games
Representing Belarus
Bronze medal – third place	1996 Atlanta	All-Around
Bronze medal – third place	1996 Atlanta	Vault
Bronze medal – third place	1996 Atlanta	Parallel Bars
Bronze medal – third place	1996 Atlanta	Horizontal Bar
Representing CIS ( Unified Team)
Gold medal – first place	1992 Barcelona	Team
Gold medal – first place	1992 Barcelona	All-Around
Gold medal – first place	1992 Barcelona	Pommel Horse
Gold medal – first place	1992 Barcelona	Rings
Gold medal – first place	1992 Barcelona	Vault
Gold medal – first place	1992 Barcelona	Parallel Bars
World Championships
Representing Belarus
Gold medal – first place	1993 Birmingham	All-Around
Gold medal – first place	1993 Birmingham	Vault
Gold medal – first place	1993 Birmingham	Parallel Bars
Gold medal – first place	1994 Brisbane	Floor
Gold medal – first place	1994 Brisbane	Vault
Gold medal – first place	1994 Brisbane	Horizontal Bar
Gold medal – first place	1995 Sabae	Floor
Gold medal – first place	1995 Sabae	Parallel Bars
Gold medal – first place	1996 San Juan	Floor
Silver medal – second place	1993 Birmingham	Floor
Silver medal – second place	1995 Sabae	All-Around
Silver medal – second place	1996 San Juan	Parallel Bars
Bronze medal – third place	1994 Brisbane	All-Around
Bronze medal – third place	1995 Sabae	Vault
Bronze medal – third place	1996 San Juan	Horizontal Bar
Representing CIS ( Unified Team)
Gold medal – first place	1992 Paris	Pommel Horse
Gold medal – first place	1992 Paris	Rings
Silver medal – second place	1992 Paris	Floor
Representing Soviet Union
Gold medal – first place	1991 Indianapolis	Team
Silver medal – second place	1991 Indianapolis	All-Around
Silver medal – second place	1991 Indianapolis	Floor
Silver medal – second place	1991 Indianapolis	Vault
Bronze medal – third place	1991 Indianapolis	Horizontal Bar
European Championships
Representing Belarus
Gold medal – first place	1994 Prague	Vault
Gold medal – first place	1996 Broendby	Floor
Gold medal – first place	1996 Broendby	Vault
Gold medal – first place	1996 Broendby	Parallel Bars
Silver medal – second place	1994 Prague	Horizontal Bar
Silver medal – second place	1996 Broendby	All-Around
Bronze medal – third place	1996 Broendby	Horizontal Bar
Representing CIS ( Unified Team)
Gold medal – first place	1992 Budapest	Pommel Horse
Gold medal – first place	1992 Budapest	Vault
Silver medal – second place	1992 Budapest	Floor
Silver medal – second place	1992 Budapest	Rings
Silver medal – second place	1992 Budapest	Parallel Bars
Bronze medal – third place	1992 Budapest	All-Around
Representing Soviet Union
Gold medal – first place	1990 Lausanne	Floor
Gold medal – first place	1990 Lausanne	Vault
Gold medal – first place	1990 Lausanne	Horizontal Bar
Universiade
Representing Belarus
Gold medal – first place	1993 Buffalo	All-Around
Gold medal – first place	1993 Buffalo	Vault
Gold medal – first place	1995 Fukuoka	Vault
Silver medal – second place	1993 Buffalo	Parallel Bars
Silver medal – second place	1995 Fukuoka	Parallel Bars
Silver medal – second place	1995 Fukuoka	Horizontal Bar
Bronze medal – third place	1993 Buffalo	Horizontal Bar
Bronze medal – third place	1995 Fukuoka	All-Around
Goodwill Games
Representing Soviet Union
Gold medal – first place	1990 Seattle	Team
Gold medal – first place	1990 Seattle	All-Around
Gold medal – first place	1990 Seattle	Vault
Gold medal – first place	1990 Seattle	Horizontal Bar
Silver medal – second place	1990 Seattle	Floor
World Cup Final
Representing Soviet Union
Gold medal – first place	1990 Brussels	Floor
Gold medal – first place	1990 Brussels	Vault
Silver medal – second place	1990 Brussels	All-Around
Bronze medal – third place	1990 Brussels	Rings

Vitaly Venediktovich Scherbo (Note: Russian: Виталий Венедиктович Щербо; Belarusian: Віталь Венядзіктавіч Шчэрба, romanized: Vital' Vyenyadziktavich Shcherba) (born 13 January 1972) is a Belarusian former artistic gymnast. One of the most successful gymnasts of all time, as of at least as recently as after the 2008 Beijing Summer Olympics, he is the only male gymnast in the 100+ year history of the World Championships to have won a world title in all 8 events (individual all-around in 1993, team in 1991, floor in 1994, 1995 and 1996, horizontal bar in 1994, parallel bars in 1993 and 1995, pommel horse in 1992, rings in 1992, vault in 1993 and 1994). He was the most successful athlete at the 1992 Summer Olympics, winning 6 of 8 events – team, all-around, and 4 of the 6 event finals.

== Gymnastics career ==
His first international performances were in 1990–1991, when he competed for the USSR team at the World Championship and the World Cup. He was the 1991 World All-Around silver medalist behind teammate Grigori Misutin; scored a perfect 10.0 on the vault at the European Championships in 1990; and starred at the Goodwill Games in Seattle. He had occasional bouts of inconsistency, and as the 1992 Barcelona Olympics approached, the Unified Team coaches regarded him as less of a medal prospect than his more experienced and reliable teammates. In one of the most dominant performances in history, Scherbo won six out of the possible eight awarded gold medals at the 1992 Summer Olympics in Barcelona. His golds came in the team event, the all-around, pommel horse (tie), rings, vault, and parallel bars.

Scherbo and his wife Irina relocated to the United States, settling in State College, Pennsylvania. The move enabled them to take advantage of Scherbo's Olympic success. He followed up on his Olympic accomplishments, placing first in the 1993 World All-Around title, third place in 1994, and second place in 1995's World All-Around title.

On 13 December 1995, Scherbo's wife Irina was involved in a single-car accident, in which she skidded off a road and slammed into a tree. She suffered multiple fractures to her ribs and pelvis, lapsed into a coma, and her internal injuries were so severe that doctors told her husband that she only had a 1 in 100 chance of surviving. Scherbo stopped his training altogether. He gained 15 pounds and began abusing alcohol. After a month, Irina finally woke up from her coma, and insisted that her husband resume his training for the upcoming Olympic season. As his wife made a recovery, Scherbo similarly began to regain peak physical condition, winning yet another World title in 1996. At the 1996 Summer Olympics in Atlanta, his performances reflected his lack of preparation time, both due to his wife's accident and a recent shoulder surgery.

Scherbo had planned to compete in the 1997 World Championships but broke his hand in a motorcycle accident before then and retired soon after.

== Sexual assault allegations ==
In October 2017, former Ukrainian Olympic champion gymnast Tatiana Gutsu accused Scherbo of violently raping her when she was 15, when they were at the USSR national team training camp in 1991.

== Eponymous skills ==
Scherbo (vault) – a Yurchenko-style vault defined by its unique entry, specifically a full twist within the back-handspring between the springboard and the vaulting table.

== See also ==
- List of multiple Olympic gold medalists at a single Games
- List of multiple Olympic gold medalists
- List of Olympic medal leaders in men's gymnastics
- List of multiple Summer Olympic medalists
