= Liu Jun (basketball) =

Chinese basketball player

Medal record

Women's basketball

Representing China

Olympic Games
Silver medal – second place	1992 Barcelona	Team competition

Asian Games
Bronze medal – third place	1994 Hiroshima	Team competition

Liu Jun (simplified Chinese: 刘军; traditional Chinese: 劉軍; pinyin: Liú Jūn; born 15 October 1969) is a Chinese former basketball player who competed in the 1992 Summer Olympics and in the 1996 Summer Olympics.
