= Yoo Ok-ryul =

South Korean gymnast (born 1973)

- 유옥렬
- Alternative name: Yu Ok-yeol
- Born: 1 March 1973 (age 53)
- Height: 1.55 m (5 ft 1 in)

Gymnastics career
- Discipline: Men's artistic gymnastics
- Country represented: South Korea
Medal record
Men's artistic gymnastics
Representing South Korea
Olympic Games
Bronze medal – third place	1992 Barcelona	Vault
World Championships
Gold medal – first place	1991 Indianapolis	Vault
Gold medal – first place	1992 Paris	Vault
Bronze medal – third place	1993 Birmingham	Vault
Asian Games
Silver medal – second place	1994 Hiroshima	Team
Silver medal – second place	1994 Hiroshima	Rings
Bronze medal – third place	1990 Beijing	Team

Korean name
- Hangul: 유옥렬
- Hanja: 柳玉烈
- RR: Yu Okryeol
- MR: Yu Ongnyŏl

Yoo Ok-ryul (born 1 March 1973) is a Korean former gymnast who competed in the 1992 Summer Olympics, where he won the bronze medal on vault.

== Education ==
- Kyung Hee University
