= Peng Ping =

Chinese basketball player

Medal record

Women's basketball

Representing China

Olympic Games
Silver medal – second place	1992 Barcelona	Team competition

Asian Games
Gold medal – first place	1986 Seoul	Team competition
Silver medal – second place	1990 Beijing	Team competition
Bronze medal – third place	1994 Hiroshima	Team competition

Peng Ping (Chinese: 彭萍; born January 14, 1967) is a retired Chinese female basketball player who competed in the 1988 Summer Olympics and the 1992 Summer Olympics. She was a member of the China women's national basketball team that won the 1992 Olympic silver medals in basketball in Barcelona, Spain.

== Family ==
Her husband Song Tao is also a former Chinese basketball player, who is the first player from Asia to be drafted by an NBA team.
