= Oh Sung-sik =

South Korean basketball player

Personal information
- Nationality: South Korean
- Born: 12 September 1970 (age 54); Busan, South Korea

Sport
- Sport: Basketball

Oh Sung-sik (born 12 September 1970) is a South Korean basketball player. He competed in the men's tournament at the 1996 Summer Olympics.
