= Omar Walcott =

Venezuelan basketball player (1965–2026)

Personal information
- Born: 24 July 1965 Caracas, Venezuela
- Died: 14 November 2026 (aged 61) New Jersey, U.S.
- Listed height: 203 cm (6 ft 8 in)
- Listed weight: 244 lb (111 kg)

Career information
- College: St. Peter's (1984-1988)
- NBA draft: 1988: undrafted
- Playing career: 1988–2009
- Position: Power forward

Career history
- 1988: Jersey Shore Bucs
- 1989–1990: Ovarense
- 1990: New York Whitecaps
- 1990-1991: Ovarense
- 1991-1992: Marinos de Oriente
- 1992-1993: Ovarense
- 1993: Marinos de Oriente
- 1994: Saski Baskonia
- 1994-1997: Marinos de Oriente
- 1997-1998: AE Larisa
- 1998-1999: Marinos de Oriente
- 1999-2001: Cocodrilos de Caracas
- 2001-2002: Guaiqueríes de Margarita
- 2002: Delfines de Miranda
- 2002-2009: Gaiteros del Zulia

Omar Alejandro Walcott Roberts (24 July 1965 – 14 November 2026) was a Venezuelan basketball player who competed in the 1992 Summer Olympics.

He died from lung cancer at a hospital in New Jersey on 14 November 2026, at the age of 61.
