= Li Jing (gymnast) =

Chinese artistic gymnast

- 李敬
- Born: 23 February 1970 (age 56) Hengyang, Hunan, China

Gymnastics career
- Discipline: Men's artistic gymnastics
- Country represented: China
Medal record
Men's artistic gymnastics
Representing China
Event	1st	2nd	3rd
Olympic Games	0	3	0
World Championships	5	2	4
Asian Games	5	1	1
Total	10	6	5
Olympic Games
Silver medal – second place	1992 Barcelona	Team
Silver medal – second place	1992 Barcelona	Rings
Silver medal – second place	1992 Barcelona	Parallel bars
World Championships
Gold medal – first place	1989 Stuttgart	Parallel bars
Gold medal – first place	1991 Indianapolis	Parallel bars
Gold medal – first place	1992 Paris	Pommel horse
Gold medal – first place	1992 Paris	Parallel bars
Gold medal – first place	1994 Dortmund	Team
Silver medal – second place	1991 Indianapolis	Team
Silver medal – second place	1992 Paris	Horizontal bar
Bronze medal – third place	1989 Stuttgart	Team
Bronze medal – third place	1989 Stuttgart	All-around
Bronze medal – third place	1989 Stuttgart	Pommel horse
Bronze medal – third place	1991 Indianapolis	Pommel horse
Asian Games
Gold medal – first place	1990 Beijing	Team
Gold medal – first place	1990 Beijing	All-Around
Gold medal – first place	1990 Beijing	Vault
Gold medal – first place	1994 Hiroshima	Team
Gold medal – first place	1994 Hiroshima	Horizontal Bar
Silver medal – second place	1990 Beijing	Pommel Horse
Bronze medal – third place	1990 Beijing	Parallel Bars

Li Jing (Chinese: 李敬; born February 23, 1970) is a Chinese gymnast, world champion and Olympic medalist. He competed at the 1992 Summer Olympics in Barcelona where he received silver medals in rings, in parallel bars, and in team combined exercises.

== Gymnastics career ==
Li Jing became world champion in parallel bars in 1989, in 1991 and in 1992
