= Andreas Wecker =

German gymnast (born 1970)

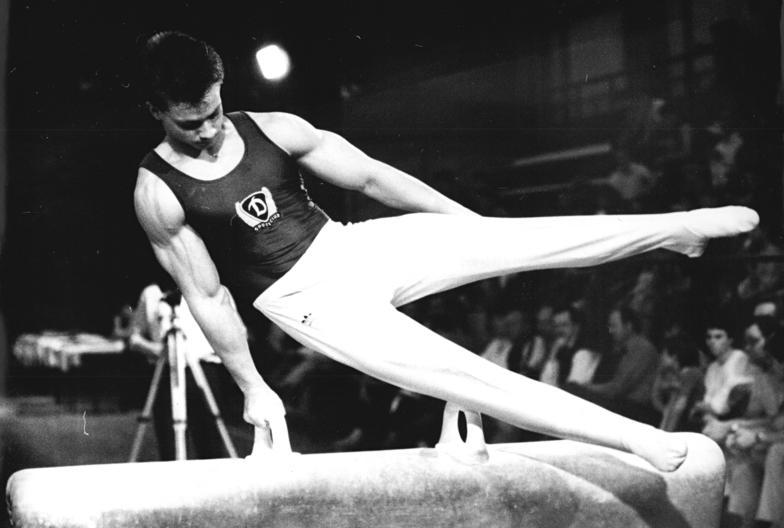

Personal information
- Born: 2 January 1970 (age 56) Staßfurt, East Germany

Gymnastics career
- Discipline: Men's artistic gymnastics
- Country represented: Germany
- Former countries represented: East Germany
Medal record
Men's artistic gymnastics
Representing East Germany
Olympic Games
Silver medal – second place	1988 Seoul	Team
World Championships
Silver medal – second place	1989 Stuttgart	Team
Silver medal – second place	1989 Stuttgart	Pommel horse
Silver medal – second place	1989 Stuttgart	Rings
Bronze medal – third place	1989 Stuttgart	Parallel bars
Representing Germany
Olympic Games
Gold medal – first place	1996 Atlanta	Horizontal bar
Silver medal – second place	1992 Barcelona	Horizontal bar
Bronze medal – third place	1992 Barcelona	Pommel horse
Bronze medal – third place	1992 Barcelona	Rings
World Championships
Gold medal – first place	1995 Sabae	Horizontal bar
Silver medal – second place	1991 Indianapolis	Rings
Silver medal – second place	1993 Birmingham	Pommel horse
Silver medal – second place	1993 Birmingham	Rings
Bronze medal – third place	1991 Indianapolis	Team
Bronze medal – third place	1993 Birmingham	All-around

Andreas Wecker (born 2 January 1970 in Staßfurt) is a German former world champion gymnast who had a long and successful career. He was a European, World, and Olympic champion. His greatest achievement during his gymnastics career was winning the gold medal on the horizontal bar at the 1996 Summer Olympics in Atlanta. In 1989, Wecker was named the last East German Sportsman of the Year.

== Gymnastics career ==
Wecker qualified for the German team for the 2000 Sydney Olympics; however, just days before his events, he suffered a serious shoulder injury that tore a biceps muscle, ending his gymnastics career. While his gymnastics career had come to an end, Andreas still maintained his athleticism by training many hours every week, keeping his body and mind in superior health.

On May 17, 2025, Andreas Wecker was inducted into the International Gymnastics Hall of Fame for his achievements during his gymnastics career. He was inducted alongside Beth Tweddle, Cătălina Ponor, and Paul Ziert in Oklahoma City, Oklahoma.

== Personal life ==
Andreas moved to the United States and started cold-pressing seed oils for his own personal use and nutrition. Soon after, he created Andreas Seed Oils, a cold-pressed Organic seed oil company. Andreas developed his own cold-press machines for which he was granted a patent on the technology. Today, Wecker spends the majority of his time running and operating his company, Andreas Seed Oils, out of his facility in Bend, Oregon.

Awards
Preceded by (East Germany) Olaf Ludwig	East German Sportsman of the Year; 1989	Succeeded by (Germany) Boris Becker (as German Sportsman of the Year)
