= Wu Qinglong =

Chinese basketball player and coach

Wu Qinglong 吴庆龙
Personal information
- Born: 27 December 1965 (age 60) Dalian, Liaoning, China
- Listed height: 6.26 ft 0 in (1.91 m)

Career information
- Playing career: 1984–1999

Career history

Playing
- 1983–1999: Liaoning Flying Leopards

Coaching
- 1997–2001: Liaoning Flying Leopards
- 2002–2006: Yunnan Running Bulls
- 2007–2008: Fujian Sturgeons (assistant)
- 2008–2009: Shaanxi Kylins
- 2009–2010: Shanxi Zhongyu
- 2012–2013: Liaoning Flying Leopards
- 2014: Shaanxi Wolves
- 2015–2016: China Men Olympics
- 2017–2018: Shenzhen Leopards
- 2018: Shanxi Loongs (assistant)
- 2018–2019: Shandong Hi-Speed Kirin
- 2019–2022: Qingdao Eagles
- 2023–2024: Liaoning Flying Leopards (assistant)
Medals
Men's basketball
Representing China
FIBA Asia Cup
Gold medal – first place	1993 Jakarta
Gold medal – first place	1995 Seoul
Bronze medal – third place	1997 Riyadh
Asian Games
Gold medal – first place	1994 Hiroshima
ABC Under-18 Championship
Silver medal – second place	1984 Seoul

Wu Qinglong (simplified Chinese: 吴庆龙; traditional Chinese: 吳慶龍; pinyin: Wú Qìng Lóng, born on 27 December 1965 in Dalian, Liaoning) is a Chinese basketball coach and former professional player who competed in the 1992 Summer Olympics and the 1996 Summer Olympics.
