= Wang Fang (basketball) =

Chinese basketball player

Personal information
- Born: 14 January 1967 (age 59)
Medals
Women's basketball
Representing China
Olympic Games
Silver medal – second place	1992 Barcelona	Team competition
Asian Games
Silver medal – second place	1990 Beijing	Team competition
Bronze medal – third place	1994 Hiroshima	Team competition

Wang Fang (Chinese: 王芳; pinyin: Wáng Fāng, born 14 January 1967) is a Chinese former basketball player who competed in the 1992 Summer Olympics. She won the Women's Chinese Basketball Association (WCBA) title in 2009 while the head coach of the Liaoning Flying Eagles. Wang was a coach for the Chinese women's team at the 2008 Summer Olympics. Her son, Kevin Zhang, is also a basketball player.
