= Adiljan Suleyman =

Chinese basketball player (born 1967)

Adiljan Suleyman 阿的江
Personal information
- Born: 21 August 1967 (age 59) Hotan County, Xinjiang, China
- Listed height: 1.82 m (6 ft 0 in)

Career information
- Playing career: 1984–2000

Career history

Playing
- 1984–2000: Bayi Rockets

Coaching
- 2001–2018: Bayi Rockets
- 2018–2022: Xinjiang Flying Tigers
- 2022–2024: Ningbo Rockets
Medals
Men's basketball
Representing China
FIBA Asia Championship
Gold medal – first place	1991 Kobe
Gold medal – first place	1993 Jakarta
Gold medal – first place	1995 Seoul
Asian Games
Gold medal – first place	1994 Hiroshima
Universiade Games
Bronze medal – third place	1993 Buffalo

Adiljan Suleyman (Uyghur: ئادىلجان سۇلايمان; Chinese: 阿的江; pinyin: Ādìjiāng·Sūláimàn; born August 21, 1967) is a Chinese former professional basketball player. Adiljan last played and coached for the Bayi Rockets, a Chinese Basketball Association team based in Ningbo. He is a Point guard. He is 1.80 m (5'11 ½") in height and he weighs 88 kg. Adijan competed at the 1992 Olympic Basketball Tournament for Team China.
