= Song Ligang =

Chinese basketball player

Song Ligang (simplified Chinese: 宋力刚; traditional Chinese: 宋力剛; pinyin: Sòng Lìgāng; born June 8, 1967, in Tianjin) is a former Chinese basketball player. He competed at 1992 Barcelona Olympic Games, and was the flagbearer of Chinese Olympic Team at the opening ceremony.

He also competed for his native country at the 1988 Summer Olympics. Song currently serves as an officer in Hainan government.
