= Sun Fengwu =

Chinese basketball player and coach

Sun Fengwu 孙凤武
Personal information
- Born: 19 March 1962 (age 64) Huai'an, Jiangsu, China
- Listed height: 6.06 ft 0 in (1.85 m)

Career information
- Playing career: 1979–1992
- Position: Shooting guard / point guard

Career history

Coaching
- 1992–1995: Singapore
- 1996–1998: Jiangsu Dragons
- 2002–2005: China Women U19
- 2005–2007: China U19
- 2007: Yunnan Running Bulls
- 2009–2013: China Women
Medals
Men's basketball
Representing China
FIBA Asia Cup
Gold medal – first place	1983 Hong Kong
Bronze medal – third place	1985 Kuala Lumpur
Gold medal – first place	1987 Bangkok
Gold medal – first place	1989 Beijing
Gold medal – first place	1991 Kobe
Asian Games
Silver medal – second place	1982 New Delhi
Gold medal – first place	1986 Seoul
Gold medal – first place	1990 Beijing
FIBA Under-18 Asia Cup
Gold medal – first place	1980 Bangkok

Sun Fengwu (born 19 March 1962 in Chuzhou District, Huai'an, Jiangsu) is a Chinese basketball coach and former Olympic player who competed in the 1984 Summer Olympics, the 1988 Summer Olympics, and the 1992 Summer Olympics.

After retired as a player in 1992, Sun left China and went to Singapore, and became the head coach of the Singapore national basketball team. Later he returned to China and coached the China women's national basketball team in 2012 Summer Olympics in London, where they finished 6th.

He is now the head coach of the Chinese Basketball Association team Foshan Dralions.
