= Gong Xiaobin =

Chinese basketball player (born 1969)

Gong Xiaobin 巩晓彬
Personal information
- Born: 23 November 1969 (age 56) Jinan, Shandong, China
- Listed height: 6.62 ft 0 in (2.02 m)

Career information
- Playing career: 1987–2003

Career history

Playing
- 1995–2003: Shandong Hi-Speed Kirin

Coaching
- 2003–2010: Shandong Hi-Speed Kirin
- 2011–2015: Shandong Hi-Speed Kirin
- 2015–2018: Qingdao Eagles
- 2019–2021: Shandong Hi-Speed Kirin
Medals
Men's basketball
Representing China
Asian Games
Gold medal – first place	1994 Hiroshima	Team
Gold medal – first place	1998 Bangkok	Team
Silver medal – second place	2002 Busan	Team
FIBA Asia Championship
Gold medal – first place	1995 Seoul	Team
Bronze medal – third place	1997 Riyadh	Team
Gold medal – first place	1999 Fukuoka	Team

Gong Xiaobin (simplified Chinese: 巩晓彬; traditional Chinese: 鞏曉彬; pinyin: Gǒng Xiǎo Bin; born November 23, 1969, in Jinan, Shandong), is a retired Chinese professional basketball player, who enjoyed an outstanding career in the Chinese Basketball Association (CBA). At 2.03 m (6 ft 8 in), and 104 kg (229 lb), he played at the power forward and center positions. In 1990, he was chosen as one of China's 50 all-time greatest basketball players.

== Early life ==
In 1982, Gong began to play for the Shandong Province youth soccer team, and in 1986, at the age of 17, he was selected to the Chinese national Under-19 team. In 1988, Gong competed in a national urban basketball tournament, and was chosen as an outstanding player; he was also listed as one of China's top ten basketball players of that year; in 1989, at the age of 20, Gong joined the Chinese national basketball team.

== Professional career ==
In the Chinese Basketball Association (CBA), Gong played at the center position for the Shandong Lions, and in the 1997–98 season, he won the league's scoring title and regular season MVP award. He was named to the list of the 50 greatest Chinese basketball players of the second half of the 20th century.

As a basketball player, Gong Xiao Bin represented his native Shandong Province, both as a sports role model, and as a player, leading the Shandong men's team at the Chinese National Games, including the 1997 games in Shanghai, at which the Shandong Province finished 3rd overall.

== Chinese national team ==
As a member of the senior men's Chinese national basketball team, Gong competed for China in the 1989 Asian Games, the 1994 FIBA World Championship, and in the 1996 Summer Olympics. In 2002, at the age of 33, he was still playing internationally, representing China in the Asian games and the FIBA World Championship.

== Coaching career ==
Gong retired from his career as a basketball player in 2003, and he began a new career coaching basketball, for the CBA's Shandong Lions.

== See also ==
- List of individual Chinese Basketball Association scoring leaders by season
