= Wang Zhidan =

Chinese basketball player

Wang Zhidan 王治单
Personal information
- Born: 19 December 1970 (age 55) Dalian, Liaoning, China
- Listed height: 7.02 ft 0 in (2.14 m)

Career information
- Playing career: 1983–2002
- Position: Center
Medals
Men's basketball
Representing China
FIBA Asia Cup
Gold medal – first place	1989 Beijing
Gold medal – first place	1991 Kobe
Asian Games
Gold medal – first place	1990 Beijing
Gold medal – first place	1994 Hiroshima
East Asian Games
Gold medal – first place	1993 Shanghai
ABC Under-18 Championship
Gold medal – first place	1989 Manila

Wang Zhidan (born 19 December 1970) is a Chinese basketball player. He competed in the men's tournament at the 1992 Summer Olympics.
