= Shan Tao (basketball) =

Chinese basketball player

Shan Tao 单涛
Personal information
- Born: 31 May 1970 (age 56) Shanghai, China
- Listed height: 7.08 ft 0 in (2.16 m)

Career information
- Playing career: 1986–2009
- Position: Center

Career history
- 1994–1999: Beijing Ducks
- 2000–2001: Double Stars Jinan Military
- 2001–2004: Beijing Olympians
- 2005–2006: Xinjiang Flying Tigers
- 2006–2007: Dongguan New Century
- 2007–2008: Shanxi Zhongyu
- 2008–2009: Shandong Gold Lions

Career highlights
- * CBA All-Star (1995)
Medals
Men's basketball
Representing China
FIBA Asia Cup
Gold medal – first place	1993 Jakarta
Gold medal – first place	1995 Seoul
Asian Games
Gold medal – first place	1990 Beijing
Gold medal – first place	1994 Hiroshima
Universiade Games
Bronze medal – third place	1993 Buffalo

Shan Tao (born 30 May 1970) is a Chinese former basketball player who competed in the 1992 Summer Olympics and in the 1996 Summer Olympics.
