= Japan at the 1988 Summer Olympics =

- IOC code: JPN
- NOC: Japanese Olympic Committee

in Seoul
- Competitors: 255 (186 men and 69 women) in 23 sports
- Flag bearer: Mikako Kotani
- Medals Ranked 14th: Gold 4 Silver 3 Bronze 7 Total 14

Summer Olympics appearances (overview)
- 1912; 1920; 1924; 1928; 1932; 1936; 1948; 1952; 1956; 1960; 1964; 1968; 1972; 1976; 1980; 1984; 1988; 1992; 1996; 2000; 2004; 2008; 2012; 2016; 2020; 2024; 2028

Japan competed at the 1988 Summer Olympics in Seoul, South Korea. 255 competitors, 186 men and 69 women, took part in 166 events in 23 sports.

== Medalists ==
Medal	Name	Sport	Event	Date
Gold	Daichi Suzuki	Swimming	Men's 100 m backstroke	September 24
Gold	Takashi Kobayashi	Wrestling	Men's freestyle light flyweight	September 29
Gold	Mitsuru Sato	Wrestling	Men's freestyle flyweight	September 30
Gold	Hitoshi Saito	Judo	Men's heavyweight	October 1
Silver	Tomoko Hasegawa	Shooting	Women's 25 m pistol	September 19
Silver	Atsuji Miyahara	Wrestling	Men's Greco-Roman flyweight	September 21
Silver	Akira Ota	Wrestling	Men's freestyle light heavyweight	September 29
Bronze	Hiroyuki Konishi; Takahiro Yamada; Toshiharu Sato; Daisuke Nishikawa; Koichi Mizushima; Yukio Iketani	Gymnastics	Men's team all-around	September 20
Bronze	Yukio Iketani	Gymnastics	Men's floor	September 24
Bronze	Shinji Hosokawa	Judo	Men's extra lightweight	September 25
Bronze	Yosuke Yamamoto	Judo	Men's half lightweight	September 26
Bronze	Akinobu Osako	Judo	Men's middleweight	September 29
Bronze	Mikako Kotani	Synchronized swimming	Women's solo	September 30
Bronze	Miyako Tanaka; Mikako Kotani	Synchronized swimming	Women's duet	October 1

Medals by sport
Sport	1st place, gold medalist(s)	2nd place, silver medalist(s)	3rd place, bronze medalist(s)	Total
Wrestling	2	2	0	4
Judo	1	0	3	4
Swimming	1	0	0	1
Shooting	0	1	0	1
Gymnastics	0	0	2	2
Synchronized swimming	0	0	2	2
Total	4	3	7	14

== Competitors ==
The following is the list of number of competitors in the Games.

Sport	Men	Women	Total
Archery	3	3	6
Athletics	24	6	30
Boxing	7	–	7
Canoeing	6	2	8
Cycling	9	3	12
Diving	2	2	4
Equestrian	8	2	10
Fencing	5	5	10
Gymnastics	6	8	14
Handball	15	0	15
Judo	7	–	7
Modern pentathlon	3	–	3
Rowing	12	0	12
Sailing	11	2	13
Shooting	9	5	14
Swimming	12	11	23
Synchronized swimming	–	3	3
Table tennis	4	3	7
Tennis	2	2	4
Volleyball	12	12	24
Weightlifting	10	–	10
Wrestling	20	–	20
Total	186	69	255

== Archery ==
In their fourth Olympic archery competition, Japan was unable to win any medals. Defending bronze medallist Hiroshi Yamamoto placed eighth, the only individual archer to make the finals. The men's team placed sixth overall, while the women's team was last place.

Women's Individual Competition:

- Toyoka Oki — Preliminary round (→ 31st place)
- Keiko Nakagomi — Preliminary round (→ 52nd place)
- Kyoko Kitahara — Preliminary round (→ 53rd place)

Men's Individual Competition:

- Hiroshi Yamamoto — Final (→ 8th place)
- Takayoshi Matsushita — Quarterfinal (→ 14th place)
- Terushi Furuhashi — Preliminary round (→ 40th place)

Women's Team Competition:

- Oki, Nakagomi, and Kitahara — Preliminary round (→ 15th place)

Men's Team Competition:

- Yamamoto, Matsushita, and Furuhashi — Final (→ 6th place)

== Athletics ==
Men's 100 metres

- Koji Kurihara
- Takahiko Kasahara
- Tomohiro Osawa

Men's 200 metres

- Kenji Yamauchi

Men's 400 metres

- Susumu Takano

Men's 5,000 metres

- Shuichi Yoneshige

Men's 10,000 metres

- Kozu Akutsu

- Heat — 28:16.43
- Final — 28:09.70 (→ 14th place)

- Shuichi Yoneshige

- Heat — 28:26.04
- Final — 29:04.44 (→ 17th place)

- Tsukasa Endo

- Heat — did not finish (→ did not advance)

Men's Marathon

- Takeyuki Nakayama

- Final — 2:11:05 (→ 4th place)

- Toshihiko Seko

- Final — 2:13:41 (→ 9th place)

- Hisatoshi Shintaku

- Final — 2:15:42 (→ 17th place)

Men's 4 × 100 m Relay

- Kaoru Matsubara, Shinji Aoto, Koji Kurihara, and Takahiro Kasahara

- Heat — 39.70

- Shinji Aoto, Kenji Yamauchi, Koji Kurihara, and Susumu Takano

- Semi Final — 38.90 (→ did not advance)

Men's 4 × 400 m Relay

- Hirofumi Koike, Kenji Yamauchi, Hiromi Kawasumi, and Susumu Takano

- Heat — 3:05.63
- Semi Final — 3:03.80 (→ did not advance)

Men's Long Jump

- Hiroyuki Shibata

- Qualification — 7.48m (→ did not advance)

- Junichi Usui

- Qualification — NM (→ did not advance)

Men's Triple Jump

- Norifumi Yamashita

Men's Javelin Throw

- Kazuhiro Mizoguchi

- Qualification — 77.46m (→ did not advance)

- Masami Yoshida

- Qualification — 76.90m (→ did not advance)

Men's 20 km Walk

- Hirofumi Sakai

- Final — 1:24:08 (→ 26th place)

- Tadahiro Kosaka

- Final — 1:32:46 (→ 47th place)

Men's 50 km Walk

- Tadahiro Kosaka

- Final — 4'03:12 (→ 31st place)

Women's 10,000 metres

- Akemi Matsuno

Women's Marathon

- Eriko Asai

- Final — 2:34:41 (→ 25th place)

- Kumi Araki

- Final — 2:35:15 (→ 28th place)

- Misako Miyahara

- Final — 2:35:26 (→ 29th place)

Women's High Jump

- Megumi Sato

Women's Javelin Throw

- Emi Matsui

- Qualification — 56.26m (→ did not advance)

== Boxing ==
Men's Light Flyweight (– 48 kg)

- Mamoru Kuroiwa

- First Round — Lost to Ochiryn Demberel (MGL), KO-3

== Cycling ==
Twelve cyclists, nine men and three women, represented Japan in 1988.

Men's road race

- Mitsuhiro Suzuki
- Kyoshi Miura
- Yoshihiro Tsumuraya

Men's sprint

- Hideki Miwa

Men's 1 km time trial

- Hiroshi Toyooka

Men's team pursuit

- Koichi Azuma
- Fumiharu Miyamoto
- Kazuaki Sasaki
- Kazuo Takikawa

Men's points race

- Yoshihiro Tsumuraya

Women's road race

- Terumi Ogura — 2:00:52 (→ 30th place)
- Natsue Seki — 2:14:32 (→ 50th place)

Women's sprint

- Seiko Hashimoto

== Diving ==
Men

Athlete	Event	Preliminary		Final	
Athlete	Event	Points	Rank	Points	Rank
Keita Kaneto	3 m springboard	577.50	10 Q	562.05	11
Isao Yamagishi	3 m springboard	540.72	18	Did not advance	
Keita Kaneto	10 m platform	497.04	14	Did not advance	
Isao Yamagishi	10 m platform	517.80	12 Q	500.70	10

Women

Athlete	Event	Preliminary		Final	
Athlete	Event	Points	Rank	Points	Rank
Yuki Motobuchi	3 m springboard	404.76	15	Did not advance	
Masako Asada	3 m springboard	380.94	21	Did not advance	
Yuki Motobuchi	10 m platform	333.45	16	Did not advance	
Masako Asada	10 m platform	327.93	17	Did not advance	

== Fencing ==
Ten fencers, five men and five women, represented Japan in 1988.

Men's foil

- Koji Emura
- Kenichi Umezawa
- Yoshihiko Kanatsu

Men's team foil

- Matsuo Azuma, Harunobu Deno, Koji Emura, Yoshihiko Kanatsu, Kenichi Umezawa

Women's foil

- Tomoko Oka
- Akemi Morikawa
- Mieko Miyahara

Women's team foil

- Nona Kiritani, Keiko Mine, Mieko Miyahara, Akemi Morikawa, Tomoko Oka

== Handball ==
=== Men's team competition ===
- Preliminary round (group B)

- vs East Germany (18 — 25)
- vs Spain (19 — 25)
- vs Hungary (19 — 22)
- vs South Korea (24 — 33)
- vs Czechoslovakia (17 — 21)

- Classification Match

- 11th/12th place: vs United States 24 — 21 (→ 11th place)

- Team roster

- Hidetada Ito
- Hiroshi Yanai
- Izumi Fujii
- Kazuhiro Miyashita
- Kenji Tamamura
- Kiyoshi Nishiyama
- Kodo Yamamoto
- Koji Tachiki
- Seiichi Takamura
- Shinichi Shudo
- Shinji Okuda
- Takashi Taguchi
- Toshiyuki Yamamura
- Yoshihiro Nikawadori
- Yukihiro Hashimoto

== Modern pentathlon ==
Three male pentathletes represented Japan in 1988.

Men's Individual Competition:

- Hiroshi Saito — 4881pts (→ 30th place)
- Tadafumi Miwa — 4517pts (→ 51st place)
- Hiroaki Izumikawa — 3722pts (→ 63rd place)

Men's Team Competition:

- Saito, Miwa, and Izumikawa — 13120pts (→ 17th place)

== Swimming ==
Men's 100 m Freestyle

- Shigeo Ogata

- Heat — 52.08 (→ did not advance, 32nd place)

Men's 200 m Freestyle

- Shigeo Ogata

- Heat — 1:51.14
- B-Final — 1:51.89 (→ 15th place)

Men's 400 m Freestyle

- Yoshiyuki Mizumoto

- Heat — 4:02.02 (→ did not advance, 32nd place)

- Shigeo Ogata

- Heat — 4:05.68 (→ did not advance, 38th place)

Men's 1500 m Freestyle

- Masashi Kato

- Heat — 15:47.35 (→ did not advance, 25th place)

- Yoshiyuki Mizumoto

- Heat — 15:52.06 (→ did not advance, 27th place)

Men's 100 m Backstroke

- Daichi Suzuki

- Heat — 55.90
- Final — 55.05 (→ Gold Medal)

- Shigemori Maruyama

- Heat — 57.54
- B-Final — 57.13 (→ 12th place)

Men's 200 m Backstroke

- Daichi Suzuki

- Heat — 2:03.36
- B-Final — 2:04.67 (→ 15th place)

- Shigemori Maruyama

- Heat — 2:09.16 (→ did not advance, 32nd place)

Men's 100 m Breaststroke

- Hironobu Nagahata

- Heat — 1:04.02
- B-Final — 1:03.89 (→ 13th place)

- Kenji Watanabe

- Heat — 1:04.35 (→ did not advance, 18th place)

Men's 200 m Breaststroke

- Shigehiro Takahashi

- Heat — 2:17.69
- B-Final — 2:18.03 (→ 10th place)

- Hironobu Nagahata

- Heat — 2:22.23 (→ did not advance, 30th place)

Men's 100 m Butterfly

- Hiroshi Miura

- Heat — 54.82
- B-Final — 54.98 (→ 14th place)

- Yukinori Tanaka

- Heat — 56.19 (→ did not advance, 24th place)

Men's 200 m Butterfly

- Satoshi Takeda

- Heat — 2:01.42
- B-Final — 2:02.18 (→ 15th place)

- Hiroshi Miura

- Heat — 2:02.30 (→ did not advance, 19th place)

Men's 200 m Individual Medley

- Takahiro Fujimoto

- Heat — 2:07.23 (→ did not advance, 19th place)

- Satoshi Takeda

- Heat — 2:08.11 (→ did not advance, 22nd place)

Men's 400 m Individual Medley

- Yoshiyuki Mizumoto

- Heat — 4:28.11 (→ did not advance, 17th place)

- Takahiro Fujimoto

- Heat — 4:33.03 (→ did not advance, 25th place)

Men's 4 × 100 m Medley Relay

- Daichi Suzuki, Hironobu Nagahata, Hiroshi Miura, and Shigeo Ogata

- Heat — 3:46.88
- Final — 3:44.36 (→ 5th place)

Women's 50 m Freestyle

- Ayako Nakano

- Heat — 26.44
- B-Final — 26.45 (→ 12th place)

- Kaori Sasaki

- Heat — 26.61 (→ did not advance, 20th place)

Women's 100 m Freestyle

- Ayako Nakano

- Heat — 57.29
- B-Final — 56.72 (→ 10th place)

- Kaori Sasaki

- Heat — 58.40 (→ did not advance, 32nd place)

Women's 200 m Freestyle

- Chikako Nakamori

- Heat — 2:01.76
- B-Final — 2:02.31 (→ 14th place)

- Kaori Sasaki

- Heat — 2:06.18 (→ did not advance, 29th place)

Women's 400 m Freestyle

- Chikako Nakamori

- Heat — 4:15.51
- B-Final — 4:15.59 (→ 15th place)

- Tomomi Hosoda

- Heat — 4:17.30 (→ did not advance, 19th place)

Women's 800 m Freestyle

- Tomomi Hosoda

- Heat — 8:39.55 (→ did not advance, 11th place)

Women's 100 m Backstroke

- Satoko Morishita

- Heat — 1:05.38 (→ did not advance, 24th place)

- Tomoko Onogi

- Heat — 1:06.14 (→ did not advance, 26th place)

Women's 200 m Backstroke

- Satoko Morishita

- Heat — 2:18.74
- B-Final — 2:18.78 (→ 14th place)

- Tomoko Onogi

- Heat — 2:21.46 (→ did not advance, 20th place)

Women's 100 m Breaststroke

- Yoshie Nishioka

- Heat — 1:13.36 (→ did not advance, 25th place)

- Hiroko Nagasaki

- Heat — 1:16.63 (→ did not advance, 34th place)

Women's 200 m Breaststroke

- Yoshie Nishioka

- Heat — 2:35.81 (→ did not advance, 19th place)

- Hiroko Nagasaki

- Heat — 2:37.44 (→ did not advance, 23rd place)

Women's 100 m Butterfly

- Kiyomi Takahashi

- Heat — 1:02.04
- B-Final — 1:01.80 (→ 10th place)

- Takayo Kitano

- Heat — 1:02.35
- B-Final — 1:02.53 (→ 14th place)

Women's 200 m Butterfly

- Kiyomi Takahashi

- Heat — 2:12.68
- Final — 2:11.62 (→ 6th place)

- Takayo Kitano

- Heat — 2:15.41
- B-Final — 2:15.61 (→ 14th place)

Women's 200 m Individual Medley

- Yoshie Nishioka

- Heat — 2:20.20
- B-Final — 2:20.43 (→ 16th place)

- Hiroyo Harada

- Heat — 2:22.59 (→ did not advance, 22nd place)

Women's 400 m Individual Medley

- Yoshie Nishioka

- Heat — 4:55.31 (→ did not advance, 19th place)

- Hiroyo Harada

- Heat — 5:00.92 (→ did not advance, 23rd place)

Women's 4 × 100 m Medley Relay

- Satoko Morishita, Yoshie Nishioka, Kiyomi Takahashi, and Ayako Nakano

- Heat — 4:18.88 (→ did not advance, 12th place)

== Synchronized swimming ==
Three synchronized swimmers represented Japan in 1988.

Women's solo

- Mikako Kotani
- Megumi Itō
- Miyako Tanaka

Women's duet

- Mikako Kotani
- Miyako Tanaka

== Tennis ==
Women's Singles Competition

- Kumiko Okamoto

- First Round — Lost to Catarina Lindqvist (Sweden) 6-7, 5-7

- Etsuko Inoue

- First Round — Lost to Il-Soon Kim (South Korea) 3-6, 6-3, 5-7

== Volleyball ==
=== Men's team competition ===
- Preliminary round (group B)

- Lost to United States (0-3)
- Lost to Argentina (1-3)
- Lost to France (1-3)
- Defeated Tunisia (3-0)
- Lost to the Netherlands (0-3)

- Classification Matches

- 9th/12th place: Defeated South Korea (3-2)
- 9th/10th place: Lost to Italy (2-3) → Tenth place

- Team roster

- Akihiro Iwashima
- Yasunori Kumada
- Eizaburo Mitsuhashi
- Masayoshi Manabe
- Yuji Kasama
- Kazutomo Yoneyama
- Hiromichi Kageyama
- Hideharu Hara
- Kimio Sugimoto
- Yuzuru Inoue
- Masaki Kaito
- Shunichi Kawai

- Head coach: Kazuya Mitake

=== Women's team competition ===
- Preliminary round (group A)

- Defeated Soviet Union (3-2)
- Lost to East Germany (2-3)
- Defeated South Korea (3-1)

- Semi Finals

- Lost to Peru (2-3)

- Final

- Lost to PR China (0-3) → Fourth place

- Team roster

- Yumi Maruyama
- Kayoko Sugiyama
- Reiko Takizawa
- Miyako Yamashita
- Akemi Sugiyama
- Ichiko Sato
- Norie Hiro
- Kumi Nakada
- Yukari Kawase
- Motoko Obayashi
- Yukiko Takahashi
- Sachiko Fujita

- Head coach: Noriyuki Muneuchi
