= China at the 1988 Summer Olympics =

- IOC code: CHN
- NOC: Chinese Olympic Committee
- Website: \

in Seoul, South Korea 17 September–2 October 1988
- Competitors: 273 (149 men and 124 women) in 25 sports
- Flag bearer: Song Tao
- Medals Ranked 11th: Gold 5 Silver 11 Bronze 12 Total 28

Summer Olympics appearances (overview)
- 1952; 1956–1980; 1984; 1988; 1992; 1996; 2000; 2004; 2008; 2012; 2016; 2020; 2024; 2028

Other related appearances
- Republic of China (1924–1948)

The People's Republic of China competed at the 1988 Summer Olympics in Seoul, South Korea. 273 competitors, 149 men and 124 women, took part in 150 events in 25 sports.

== Competitors ==
The following is the list of number of competitors in the Games.

Sport	Men	Women	Total
Archery	3	3	6
Athletics	16	28	44
Basketball	12	10	22
Boxing	2	–	2
Canoeing	4	0	4
Cycling	4	4	8
Diving	4	4	8
Fencing	10	5	15
Football	14	–	14
Gymnastics	6	8	14
Handball	0	12	12
Judo	5	–	5
Modern pentathlon	1	–	1
Rowing	0	11	11
Sailing	3	2	5
Shooting	12	8	20
Swimming	13	12	25
Synchronized swimming	–	3	3
Table tennis	4	3	7
Tennis	2	0	2
Volleyball	0	11	11
Water polo	13	–	13
Weightlifting	10	–	10
Wrestling	11	–	11
Total	149	124	273

== Medalists ==
Medal	Name	Sport	Event	Date
Gold	Xu Yanmei	Diving	Women's 10 metre platform	18 September
Gold	Lou Yun	Gymnastics	Men's vault	24 September
Gold	Gao Min	Diving	Women's 3 metre springboard	25 September
Gold	Chen Longcan; Qingguang Wei	Table tennis	Men's doubles	30 September
Gold	Chen Jing	Table tennis	Women's singles	1 October
Silver	Zhuang Yong	Swimming	Women's 100 metre freestyle	19 September
Silver	He Yingqiang	Weightlifting	Men's 56 kg	19 September
Silver	Tan Liangde	Diving	Men's 3 metre springboard	20 September
Silver	Huang Xiaomin	Swimming	Women's 200 metre breaststroke	21 September
Silver	Huang Shiping	Shooting	Men's 50 metre running target	23 September
Silver	Hu Yadong; Li Ronghua; Yang Xiao; Zhang Xianghua; Zhou Shouying	Rowing	Women's coxed four	24 September
Silver	Li Qing	Diving	Women's 3 metre springboard	25 September
Silver	Yang Wenyi	Swimming	Women's 50 metre freestyle	25 September
Silver	Xiong Ni	Diving	Men's 10 metre platform	27 September
Silver	Chen Jing; Jiao Zhimin	Table tennis	Women's doubles	30 September
Silver	Li Huifen	Table tennis	Women's singles	1 October
Bronze	He Zhuoqiang	Weightlifting	Men's 52 kg	18 September
Bronze	Liu Shoubin	Weightlifting	Men's 56 kg	19 September
Bronze	Li Deliang	Diving	Men's 3 metre springboard	20 September
Bronze	Ye Huanming	Weightlifting	Men's 60 kg	20 September
Bronze	Li Jinhe	Weightlifting	Men's 67.5 kg	21 September
Bronze	Qian Hong	Swimming	Women's 100 metre butterfly	23 September
Bronze	Lou Yun	Gymnastics	Men's floor	24 September
Bronze	Xu Haifeng	Shooting	Men's 10 metre air pistol	24 September
Bronze	Han Yaqin; He Yanwen; Hu Yadong; Li Ronghua; Yang Xiao; Zhang Xianghua; Zhang Yali; Zhou Shouying; Zhou Xiuhua	Rowing	Women's eight	25 September
Bronze	China women's national volleyball team: Li Guojun; Hou Yuzhu; Yang Xilan; Su Huijuan; Jiang Ying; Cui Yongmei; Yang Xiaojun; Zheng Meizhu; Wu Dan; Li Yueming; Wang Yajun; Zhou Hong	Volleyball	Women's tournament	29 September
Bronze	Li Meisu	Athletics	Women's shot put	1 October
Bronze	Jiao Zhimin	Table tennis	Women's singles	1 October

== Archery ==
The People's Republic of China sent three men and three women to Seoul for archery. The women were the more successful squad, taking ninth place in the team round.

Men

Athlete	Event	Ranking round		Eighth-final		Quarterfinal		Semifinal		Final	
Athlete	Event	Score	Rank	Score	Rank	Score	Rank	Score	Rank	Score	Rank
Qoiying Doje	Individual	1220	46	Did not advance							
Qiuzhong Liang	Individual	1220	47	Did not advance							
Guang Ri	Individual	1204	55	Did not advance							
Qoiying Doje; Qiuzhong Liang; Guang Ri	Team	3644	19	Did not advance							

Women

Athlete	Event	Ranking round		Eighth-final		Quarterfinal		Semifinal		Final	
Athlete	Event	Score	Rank	Score	Rank	Score	Rank	Score	Rank	Score	Rank
Shaorong Ma	Individual	1233	22	298	22	Did not advance					
Xiangjun Ma	Individual	1233	21	322	4	318	10	309	11	Did not advance	
Yawen Yao	Individual	1217	35	Did not advance							
Shaorong Ma; Xiangjun Ma; Yawen Yao	Team	3683	8	948	9	Did not advance					

== Athletics ==
Men's Marathon

- Cai Shangyan
  - Final — 2:17.54 (→ 26th place)
- Zhang Guowei
  - Final — 2:22.49 (→ 38th place)

Men's Long Jump

- Pang Yan
  - Qualification — 7.79m
  - Final — 7.86m (→ 9th place)
- Chen Zunrong
  - Qualification — 7.66m (→ did not advance)

Men's Shot Put

- Ma Yongfeng
  - Qualification – 18.27m (→ did not advance)

Men's Decathlon

- Gong Guohua — 7213 points (→ 31st place)

1. 100 metres — 11.43s
2. Long Jump — 6.22m
3. Shot Put — 13.98m
4. High Jump — 1.91m
5. 400 metres — 51.25s
6. 110m Hurdles — 15.88s
7. Discus Throw — 46.18m
8. Pole Vault — 4.60m
9. Javelin Throw — 57.84m
10. 1.500 metres — 4:54.99s

Men's 50 km Walk

- Li Baojin
  - Final — 4'00:07 (→ 28th place)

Women's Marathon

- Zhao Youfeng
  - Final — 2"27.06 (→ 5th place)
- Zhong Huandi
  - Final — 2"36.02 (→ 30th place)
- Li Juan
  - Final — 2"53.08 (→ 54th place)

Women's Discus Throw

- Hou Xuemei
  - Qualification – 62.64m
  - Final – 65.94m (→ 8th place)
- Yu Hourun
  - Qualification – 62.86m
  - Final – 64.08m (→ 9th place)
- Xing Ailan
  - Qualification – 59.26m (→ did not advance)

Women's Javelin Throw

- Li Baolian
  - Qualification – 58.92m (→ did not advance)
- Zhou Yuanxiang
  - Qualification – 56.36m (→ did not advance)

Women's Shot Put

- Li Meisu
  - Qualification – 20.30m
  - Final – 21.06m (→ Bronze Medal)
- Huang Zhihong
  - Qualification – 19.71m
  - Final – 19.82m (→ 8th place)
- Cong Yuzhen
  - Qualification – 19.56m
  - Final – 19.69m (→ 9th place)

Women's Heptathlon

- Dong Yuping
  - Final Result — 6087 points (→ 16th place)

== Basketball ==
=== Men's tournament ===
Team roster

The following is the China roster in the men's basketball tournament of the 1988 Summer Olympics.

China men's national basketball team – 1988 Summer Olympics roster
Players
Coaches

Pos.	No.	Name	Age – Date of birth	Height	Club	Ctr.
	4	Gong Luming	31 – 29 August 1957	1.74 m (5 ft 9 in)
	5	Wang Fei	25 – 25 March 1963	1.92 m (6 ft 4 in)
	6	Huang Yunlong	28 – 10 July 1960	2.00 m (6 ft 7 in)
	7	Sha Guoli	28 – 30 August 1960	1.94 m (6 ft 4 in)
	8	Zhang Xuelei	25 – 15 May 1963	2.01 m (6 ft 7 in)
	9	Song Ligang	21 – 8 June 1967	2.00 m (6 ft 7 in)
	10	Li Yaguang	30 – 8 June 1958	1.88 m (6 ft 2 in)
	11	Sun Fengwu	26 – 19 March 1962	1.90 m (6 ft 3 in)
C	12	Wang Libin	25 – 31 March 1963	2.01 m (6 ft 7 in)
	13	Zhang Yongjun	25 – 4 January 1963	1.86 m (6 ft 1 in)
	14	Xu Xiaoliang	26 – 30 January 1962	2.10 m (6 ft 11 in)
	15	Zhang Bin	26 – 28 December 1961	1.98 m (6 ft 6 in)

Head coach

Qian Chenghai

Legend

- Club – describes last
  club before the tournament
- Age – describes age
  on 17 September 1988

Group play

Pos	Team	Pld	W	L	PF	PA	PD	Pts	Qualification
1	United States	5	5	0	485	302	+183	10	Quarterfinals
2	Spain	5	4	1	484	435	+49	9	Quarterfinals
3	Brazil	5	3	2	590	522	+68	8	Quarterfinals
4	Canada	5	2	3	479	455	+24	7	Quarterfinals
5	China	5	1	4	433	527	−94	6	9th–12th classification round
6	Egypt	5	0	5	338	568	−230	5	9th–12th classification round

Source: FIBA archive
Rules for classification: 1) points; 2) head-to-head points; 3) head-to-head goal average; 4) head-to-head number of points scored.

17 September 1988

China	98–84	Egypt
Scoring by half: 47–43, 51–41

Jamsil Gymnasium, Seoul

20 September 1988

Brazil	130–108	China
Scoring by half: 72–61, 58–47

Jamsil Gymnasium, Seoul

21 September 1988

China	74–106	Spain
Scoring by half: 43–59, 31–57

Jamsil Gymnasium, Seoul

23 September 1988

China	57–108	United States
Scoring by half: 26–59, 31–49

Jamsil Gymnasium, Seoul

24 September 1988

Canada	99–96	China
Scoring by half: 56–52, 43–44

Jamsil Gymnasium, Seoul

Classification round 9–12

26 September 1988
09:45

Boxscore

China	90–93	South Korea
Scoring by half: 48–47, 42–46
Pts: Li 22; Rebs: Wang L. 7 Asts: Li 2		Pts: Kim HJ 17; Rebs: Kim YT 12; Asts: Kim HJ, Kim YT, Yoo 2

Jamsil Gymnasium, Seoul

Classification round 11/12

29 September 1988
14:30

Boxscore

Egypt	75–97	China
Scoring by half: 42–56, 33–41
Pts: Khalil 26; Rebs: Moussa 6 Asts: Moussa, Sedky 1		Pts: Zhang Y. 33; Rebs: Song 12; Asts: Sun, Wang L., Zhang Y. 3

Jamsil Gymnasium, Seoul

=== Women's tournament ===
Team roster

The following is the China roster in the women's basketball tournament of the 1988 Summer Olympics.

China women's national basketball team – 1988 Summer Olympics roster
Players
Coaches

Pos.	No.	Name	Age – Date of birth	Height	Club	Ctr.
	4	Han Qingling	27 – 16 December 1960
	5	Ling Guang	22 – 1 March 1966
	6	Li Xiaoqin	26 – 7 December 1961
	7	Zhao Wei	25 – 6 June 1963
	8	Zhang Taohua	18 – 10 March 1970
	9	Zhan Shuping	24 – 24 April 1964
	10	Peng Ping	21 – 14 January 1967
C	11	Zheng Haixia	21 – 7 March 1967
PG	12	Cong Xuedi	25 – 13 May 1963	1.66 m (5 ft 5 in)
	13	Xue Cuilan	25 – 30 April 1963
	14	Liu Qing	24 – 6 August 1964
	15	Xu Chunmei	22 – 22 March 1966

Legend

- Club – describes last
  club before the tournament
- Age – describes age
  on 17 September 1988

Group play

Pos	Team	Pld	W	L	PF	PA	PD	Pts	Qualification
1	United States	3	3	0	282	234	+48	6	Semifinals
2	Yugoslavia	3	2	1	199	211	−12	5	Semifinals
3	China	3	1	2	200	214	−14	4	Classification round
4	Czechoslovakia	3	0	3	202	224	−22	3	Classification round

Source: FIBA
Rules for classification: 1) points; 2) head-to-head points; 3) head-to-head goal average; 4) head-to-head number of points scored.

19 September 1988
21:30

Boxscore

China	53–56	Yugoslavia
Scoring by half: 32–35, 21–21
Pts: Zheng 13; Rebs: Zheng 7 Asts: Xue 3		Pts: Nakić 13; Rebs: Golić 9 Asts: Vangelovska 4

Jamsil Gymnasium, Seoul

22 September 1988
21:30

Boxscore

China	68–64	Czechoslovakia
Scoring by half: 36–36, 32–28
Pts: Zheng 12; Rebs: Han 7 Asts: Xue 3		Pts: Dobrovičová 21; Rebs: Dobrovičová 5 Asts: Kalužáková 4

Jamsil Gymnasium, Seoul

25 September 1988
11:45

Boxscore

China	79–94	United States
Scoring by half: 37–46, 42–48
Pts: Zheng 32; Rebs: Zheng 8 Asts: Cong 5		Pts: McClain 27; Rebs: McClain 13; Asts: Edwards 5

Jamsil Gymnasium, Seoul

Classification 5–8

27 September 1988
21:30

Boxscore

China	97–95 (OT)	South Korea
Scoring by half: 43–38, 42–47 Overtime: 12–10
Pts: Liu 24; Rebs: Liu 6 Asts: Xue 5		Pts: Choi 21; Rebs: Sung 7 Asts: Jeong, Park CM, Sung 2

Jamsil Gymnasium, Seoul

Classification 5/6

29 September 1988
9:45

Boxscore

Bulgaria	102–74	China
Scoring by half: 53–19, 49–55
Pts: Slavcheva 22; Rebs: Staneva 8 Asts: Radkova 2		Pts: Zheng 23; Rebs: Cong, Peng 5 Asts: Cong, Liu, Xue 1

Jamsil Gymnasium, Seoul

== Boxing ==
Athlete	Event	Round of 32	Round of 16	Quarterfinals	Semifinals	Final
Athlete	Event	Opposition Result	Opposition Result	Opposition Result	Opposition Result	Opposition Result
Dong Liu	Featherweight	John William Francis (IND); W 3-2	Serge Bouemba (GAB); W 5-0	Abdelhad Achik (MAR); L KOH	Did not advance	
Weiping Wang	Flyweight	Andreas Tews (GDR); L 0-5	Did not advance			

== Canoeing ==
Men

Athlete	Event	Heats		Semifinals		Final	
Athlete	Event	Time	Rank	Time	Rank	Time	Rank
Daen Guo; Hua Ke	C-2 500m	1:56.02	16	Did not advance			
Daen Guo; Hua Ke	C-2 1000m	4:15.50	13	4:06.49	14	Did not advance	
Fullian Ma; Bing Xue	K-2 500m	1:41.10	17	Did not advance			
Fullian Ma; Bing Xue	K-2 1000m	3:31.24	9	3:42.91	14	Did not advance	

== Cycling ==
=== Road ===
Men

Athlete	Event	Time	Rank
Hong Liu	Road race	4:32:56 (+0:34)	53
Tang Xuezhong	Road race	4:32:56 (+0:34)	44
Yingquan Cai	Road race	DNF	
Guo Longchen; Hong Liu; Tang Xuezhong; Wu Weipei	Team time trial	2:06:22.5 (+8:35)	17

Women

Athlete	Event	Time	Rank
Chen Weixiu	Road race	2:01:50 (+0:58)	47
Lu Suyan	Road race	2:00:52 (+0:00)	24
Yan Yinhua	Road race	2:00:52 (+0:00)	33

=== Track ===
Sprints

Athlete	Event	Qualifying		1st round (Repechage)	2nd round	Semifinal	Final	
Athlete	Event	Time Speed	Rank	Opposition Time	Opposition Time/Result	Opposition Result	Opposition Result	Rank
Zhou Suying	Women's sprint	12.477	11	Christa Luding Rothenburg (GDR); Louise Jones (GBR); 12.24 L Rep W Elisabetta Fanton (ITA)	Connie Paraskevin-Young (USA); 12.94 L (2nd in 5-8th classification race)	Did not advance		

== Diving ==
Men

Athlete	Event	Preliminary		Final	
Athlete	Event	Points	Rank	Points	Rank
Tan Liangde	3 m springboard	682.65	1 Q	704.88	2nd place, silver medalist(s)
Li Deliang	3 m springboard	607.77	4 Q	665.28	3rd place, bronze medalist(s)
Xiong Ni	10 m platform	601.50	2 Q	637.47	2nd place, silver medalist(s)
Li Kongzheng	10 m platform	578.31	3 Q	543.81	6

Women

Athlete	Event	Preliminary		Final	
Athlete	Event	Points	Rank	Points	Rank
Gao Min	3 m springboard	539.67	1 Q	580.23	1st place, gold medalist(s)
Li Qing	3 m springboard	501.39	2 Q	534.33	2nd place, silver medalist(s)
Xu Yanmei	10 m platform	426.27	3 Q	445.20	1st place, gold medalist(s)
Chen Xiaodan	10 m platform	456.45	1 Q	384.15	5

== Fencing ==
15 fencers, 10 men and 5 women, represented China in 1988.

Men's foil

- Liu Yunhong
- Zhang Zhicheng
- Lao Shaopei

Men's team foil

- Lao Shaopei, Liu Yunhong, Ye Chong, Zhang Zhicheng

Men's épée

- Du Zhencheng
- Ma Zhi

Men's sabre

- Zheng Zhaokang
- Jia Guihua
- Wang Zhiming

Men's team sabre

- Jia Guihua, Wang Ruiji, Wang Zhiming, Zheng Zhaokang

Women's foil

- Sun Hongyun
- Jujie Luan
- Zhu Qingyuan

Women's team foil

- Li Huahua, Jujie Luan, Sun Hongyun, Xiao Aihua, Zhu Qingyuan

== Modern pentathlon ==
One male pentathlete represented China in 1988.

Men's Individual Competition:

- Zhang Bin — 4081pts (→ 59th place)

Men's Team Competition:

- Zhang — 4081pts (→ 24th place)

== Swimming ==
Men's 50 m Freestyle

- Shen Jianqiang
  1. Heat – 23.41
  2. B-Final – 23.40 (→ 12th place)
- Feng Qiangbiao
  1. Heat – 23.47 (→ did not advance, 18th place)

Men's 100 m Freestyle

- Shen Jianqiang
  1. Heat – 51.40 (→ did not advance, 27th place)
- Feng Qiangbiao
  1. Heat – 52.45 (→ did not advance, 38th place)

Men's 200 m Freestyle

- Xie Jun
  1. Heat – 1:55.04 (→ did not advance, 39th place)

Men's 1500 m Freestyle

- Wang Dali
  1. Heat – 15:45.96 (→ did not advance, 24th place)

Men's 100 m Backstroke

- Lin Laijiu
  1. Heat – 57.74 (→ did not advance, 18th place)
- Huang Guoxiong
  1. Heat – 59.36 (→ did not advance, 35th place)

Men's 200 m Backstroke

- Lin Laijiu
  1. Heat – 2:08.28 (→ did not advance, 30th place)

Men's 100 m Breaststroke

- Chen Jianhong
  1. Heat – 1:04.09
  2. B-Final – 1:04.72 (→ 16th place)
- Jin Fu
  1. Heat – 1:05.02 (→ did not advance, 30th place)

Men's 200 m Breaststroke

- Chang Qing
  1. Heat – 2:24.45 (→ did not advance, 35th place)
- Jin Fu
  1. Heat – 2:26.05 (→ did not advance, 38th place)

Men's 100 m Butterfly

- Zhan Jiang
  1. Heat – 54.69
  2. B-Final – 54.50 (→ 9th place)
- Zheng Jian
  1. Heat – 54.86
  2. B-Final – 55.05 (→ 15th place)

Men's 200 m Butterfly

- Zhan Jiang
  1. Heat – 2:02.29 (→ 18th place)

Men's 200 m Individual Medley

- Xie Jun
  1. Heat – 2:10.52 (→ did not advance, 31st place)

Men's 4 × 100 m Freestyle Relay

- Shen Jianqiang, Li Tao, Xie Jun, and Feng Qiangbiao
  1. Heat – DSQ (→ did not advance, no ranking)

Men's 4 × 100 m Medley Relay

- Lin Laijiu, Chen Jianhong, Zhan Jiang, and Shen Jianqiang
  1. Heat – 3:48.18 (→ did not advance, 9th place)

Women's 50 m Freestyle

- Yang Wenyi
  1. Heat – 25.67
  2. Final – 25.64 (→ Silver Medal)
- Xia Fujie
  1. Heat – 26.66 (→ did not advance, 22nd place)

Women's 100 m Freestyle

- Zhuang Yong
  1. Heat – 55.84
  2. Final – 55.47 (→ Silver Medal)
- Lou Yaping
  1. Heat – 57.79 (→ did not advance, 23rd place)

Women's 200 m Freestyle

- Zhuang Yong
  1. Heat – 2:02.40
  2. B-Final – 2:14.23 (→ 16th place)
- Qian Hong
  1. Heat – 2:12.44 (→ did not advance, 40th place)

Women's 400 m Freestyle

- Yan Ming
  1. Heat – 4:18.58 (→ did not advance, 21st place)

Women's 800 m Freestyle

- Yan Ming
  1. Heat – 9:00.81 (→ did not advance, 26th place)

Women's 100 m Backstroke

- Wang Bolin
  1. Heat – 1:05.15 (→ did not advance, 23rd place)

Women's 200 m Backstroke

- Lin Li
  1. Heat – 2:18.11
  2. B-Final – 2:16.68 (→ 11th place)
- Wang Bolin
  1. Heat – 2:21.70 (→ did not advance, 23rd place)

Women's 100 m Breaststroke

- Huang Xiaomin
  1. Heat – 1:10.78
  2. Final – 1:10.53 (→ 7th place)
- Chen Huiling
  1. Heat – 1:13.65 (→ did not advance, 27th place)

Women's 200 m Breaststroke

- Huang Xiaomin
  1. Heat – 2:30.03
  2. Final – 2:27.49 (→ Silver Medal)
- Chen Huiling
  1. Heat – 2:45.87 (→ did not advance, 40th place)

Women's 100 m Butterfly

- Qian Hong
  1. Heat – 1:00.66
  2. Final – 59.52 (→ Bronze Medal)
- Wang Xiaohong
  1. Heat – 1:01.16
  2. Final – 1:01.15 (→ 8th place)

Women's 200 m Butterfly

- Wang Xiaohong
  1. Heat – 2:13.05
  2. Final – 2:12.34 (→ 7th place)
- Mo Wanlan
  1. Heat – 2:19.56 (→ did not advance, 22nd place)

Women's 200 m Individual Medley

- Lin Li
  1. Heat – 2:17.09
  2. Final – 2:17.42 (→ 7th place)

Women's 400 m Individual Medley

- Lin Li
  1. Heat – 4:48.89
  2. Final – 4:47.05 (→ 7th place)
- Yan Ming
  1. Heat – 4:49.04
  2. B-Final – 4:55.92 (→ 16th place)

Women's 4 × 100 m Freestyle Relay

- Xia Fujie, Lou Yaping, Yang Wenyi, and Zhuang Yong
  1. Heat – 3:46.36
- Xia Fujie, Yang Wenyi, Lou Yaping, and Zhuang Yong
  1. Final – 3:44.69 (→ 4th place)

Women's 4 × 100 m Medley Relay

- Yang Wenyi, Huang Xiaomin, Qian Hong, and Zhuang Yong
  1. Heat – DSQ (→ did not advance, no ranking)

== Synchronized swimming ==
Three synchronized swimmers represented China in 1988.

Women's solo

- Zhang Ying
- Luo Xi
- Tan Min

Women's duet

- Luo Xi
- Tan Min

== Tennis ==
Men's Doubles Competition

- Liu Shuhua and Ma Keqin
  1. First Round – Lost to Miloslav Mečíř and Milan Šrejber (Czechoslovakia) 5-7 1-6 4-6

== Volleyball ==
=== Women's team competition ===
- Preliminary round (group B)
  - Defeated United States (3-0)
  - Lost to Peru (2-3)
  - Defeated Brazil (3-1)
- Semi Finals
  - Lost to Soviet Union (0-3)
- Final
  - Defeated Japan (3-0) → Bronze Medal
- Team Roster
  - Li Guojun
  - Hou Yuzhu
  - Yang Xilan
  - Su Huijuan
  - Jiang Ying
  - Cui Yongmei
  - Yang Xiaojun
  - Zheng Meizhu
  - Wu Dan
  - Li Yueming
  - Wang Yajun
  - Zhou Hong

== Water polo ==
Men's Team Competition

- Preliminary round (group B)
  - Lost to Spain (6-13)
  - Lost to Greece (7-10)
  - Lost to United States (7-14)
  - Lost to Hungary (4-17)
  - Lost to Yugoslavia (7-17)
- Classification Round (Group E)
  - Lost to France (4-11)
  - Defeated South Korea (14-7) → Eleventh place
- Team Roster
  - Ni Shiwei
  - Wang Minhui
  - Yang Yong
  - Yu Xiang
  - Huang Long
  - Huang Qijiang
  - Cui Shiping
  - Zhao Bilong
  - Li Jianxiong
  - Cai Shengliu
  - Wen Fan
  - Ge Jianqing
  - Zheng Qing
- Head coach: Peng Shaorong
