= Swimming at the 1988 Summer Olympics – Women's 200 metre butterfly =

Women's 200 metre butterfly at the Games of the XXIV Olympiad
- Venue: Jamsil Indoor Swimming Pool
- Date: 25 September 1988 (heats & finals)
- Competitors: 28 from 21 nations
- Winning time: 2:09.51

Medalists
1st place, gold medalist(s)		Kathleen Nord	East Germany
2nd place, silver medalist(s)		Birte Weigang	East Germany
3rd place, bronze medalist(s)		Mary T. Meagher	United States

The women's 200 metre butterfly event at the 1988 Summer Olympics took place on 25 September at the Jamsil Indoor Swimming Pool in Seoul, South Korea.

== Records ==
Prior to this competition, the existing world and Olympic records were as follows.

World record	Mary T. Meagher (USA)	2:05.96	Brown Deer, United States	13 August 1981
Olympic record	Mary T. Meagher (USA)	2:06.90	Los Angeles, United States	4 August 1984

== Results ==
=== Heats ===
Rule: The eight fastest swimmers advance to final A (Q), while the next eight to final B (q).

Rank	Heat	Name	Nationality	Time	Notes
1	2	Kathleen Nord	East Germany	2:11.81	Q
2	3	Birte Weigang	East Germany	2:11.97	Q
3	4	Mary T. Meagher	United States	2:12.35	Q
4	4	Conny van Bentum	Netherlands	2:12.41	Q
5	4	Stela Pura	Romania	2:12.53	Q
6	2	Kiyomi Takahashi	Japan	2:12.68	Q
7	3	Trina Radke	United States	2:12.93	Q
8	3	Wang Xiaohong	China	2:13.05	Q
9	4	Gabi Reha	West Germany	2:13.09	q
10	2	Mojca Cater	Canada	2:13.21	q
11	3	Ina Beyermann	West Germany	2:13.56	q
12	4	Svitlana Kopchykova	Soviet Union	2:15.26	q
13	4	Takayo Kitano	Japan	2:15.41	q
14	2	Mette Jacobsen	Denmark	2:15.78	q
15	3	Helen Bewley	Great Britain	2:17.10	q
16	4	Lynne Wilson	Great Britain	2:17.28	q
17	4	Donna Procter	Australia	2:18.17	
18	2	Sandra Neves	Portugal	2:18.29	
19	3	Neviana Miteva	Bulgaria	2:18.44	
20	3	Kim Soo-jin	South Korea	2:19.00	
21	1	Blanca Morales	Guatemala	2:19.28	
22	2	Mo Wanlan	China	2:19.56	
23	1	Marlene Bruten	Mexico	2:19.68	
24	1	Isabelle Arnould	Belgium	2:20.74	
25	3	Claire Supiot	France	2:21.65	
26	1	Chang Hui-chien	Chinese Taipei	2:25.50	
27	1	Nguyễn Kiều Oanh	Vietnam	2:33.07	
	2	Donna McGinnis	Canada	DSQ	

=== Finals ===
==== Final B ====
Rank	Lane	Name	Nationality	Time	Notes
9	5	Mojca Cater	Canada	2:12.66	
10	3	Ina Beyermann	West Germany	2:13.74	
11	4	Gabi Reha	West Germany	2:14.20	
12	6	Svitlana Kopchykova	Soviet Union	2:14.43	
13	7	Mette Jacobsen	Denmark	2:15.60	
14	2	Takayo Kitano	Japan	2:15.61	
15	1	Helen Bewley	Great Britain	2:17.11	
16	8	Lynne Wilson	Great Britain	2:18.66	

==== Final A ====
Rank	Lane	Name	Nationality	Time	Notes
1st place, gold medalist(s)	4	Kathleen Nord	East Germany	2:09.51	
2nd place, silver medalist(s)	5	Birte Weigang	East Germany	2:09.91	
3rd place, bronze medalist(s)	3	Mary T. Meagher	United States	2:10.80	
4	2	Stela Pura	Romania	2:11.28	
5	1	Trina Radke	United States	2:11.55	
6	7	Kiyomi Takahashi	Japan	2:11.62	
7	8	Wang Xiaohong	China	2:12.34	
8	6	Conny van Bentum	Netherlands	2:13.17	
