= Swimming at the 1988 Summer Olympics – Men's 200 metre butterfly =

Men's 200 metre butterfly at the Games of the XXIV Olympiad
- Venue: Jamsil Indoor Swimming Pool
- Date: 24 September 1988 (heats & finals)
- Competitors: 42 from 31 nations
- Winning time: 1:56.94 OR

Medalists
1st place, gold medalist(s)		Michael Gross	West Germany
2nd place, silver medalist(s)		Benny Nielsen	Denmark
3rd place, bronze medalist(s)		Anthony Mosse	New Zealand

The men's 200 metre butterfly event at the 1988 Summer Olympics took place on 24 September at the Jamsil Indoor Swimming Pool in Seoul, South Korea.

== Records ==
Prior to this competition, the existing world and Olympic records were as follows.

World record	Michael Gross (FRG)	1:56.24	Hannover, West Germany	28 June 1986
Olympic record	Jon Sieben (AUS)	1:57.04	Los Angeles, United States	3 August 1984

The following records were established during the competition:

Date	Round	Name	Nation	Time	Record
24 September	Final A	Michael Gross	West Germany	1:56.94	OR

== Results ==
=== Heats ===
Rule: The eight fastest swimmers advance to final A (Q), while the next eight to final B (q).

Rank	Heat	Name	Nationality	Time	Notes
1	6	Michael Gross	West Germany	1:58.09	Q
2	4	Anthony Mosse	New Zealand	1:58.71	Q
3	5	David Wilson	Australia	1:59.02	Q
4	5	Benny Nielsen	Denmark	1:59.26	Q, NR
5	4	Jon Kelly	Canada	1:59.40	Q
6	6	Melvin Stewart	United States	1:59.78	Q
7	4	Tom Ponting	Canada	2:00.08	Q
8	6	Anthony Nesty	Suriname	2:00.17	Q, NR
9	4	Martin Roberts	Australia	2:00.32	q
10	6	Mark Dean	United States	2:00.86	q
11	6	Frank Drost	Netherlands	2:00.99	q
12	4	Tim Jones	Great Britain	2:01.01	q
13	5	Vadim Yaroshchuk	Soviet Union	2:01.05	q
14	6	Satoshi Takeda	Japan	2:01.42	q
15	3	Nick Hodgson	Great Britain	2:01.44	q
16	5	Christophe Bordeau	France	2:01.70	q
17	4	Rafał Szukała	Poland	2:01.91	
18	5	Reinhold Leitner	Austria	2:02.18	
19	4	Hiroshi Miura	Japan	2:02.30	
20	3	Ross Anderson	New Zealand	2:02.40	
21	5	Martin Herrmann	West Germany	2:02.61	
22	4	Ondřej Bureš	Czechoslovakia	2:02.93	
23	6	Jan Larsen	Denmark	2:03.01	
24	5	José Luis Ballester	Spain	2:03.32	
25	3	Jean-Marie Arnould	Belgium	2:03.76	
26	2	Diogo Madeira	Portugal	2:03.79	
26	3	Christer Wallin	Sweden	2:03.79	
28	3	Khazan Singh Tokas	India	2:03.95	
29	2	João Santos	Portugal	2:04.74	
30	3	Zhan Jiang	China	2:05.22	
31	2	Ahmed Abdullah	Egypt	2:05.28	
32	2	Joseph Eric Buhain	Philippines	2:05.32	
33	3	Théophile David	Switzerland	2:05.58	
34	6	Eduardo de Poli	Brazil	2:06.15	
35	2	Park Yeong-cheol	South Korea	2:08.57	
36	1	Emanuel Nascimento	Brazil	2:09.40	
37	2	Desmond Koh	Singapore	2:10.86	
38	1	Sultan Al-Otaibi	Kuwait	2:12.89	
39	1	William Cleveland	Virgin Islands	2:13.19	
40	1	Kristan Singleton	Virgin Islands	2:19.68	
	1	Julian Bolling	Sri Lanka	DNS	
	5	Matjaž Kozelj	Yugoslavia	DNS	

=== Finals ===
==== Final B ====
Rank	Lane	Name	Nationality	Time	Notes
9	5	Mark Dean	United States	2:00.26	
10	6	Tim Jones	Great Britain	2:00.32	
11	2	Vadim Yaroshchuk	Soviet Union	2:00.34	
12	1	Nick Hodgson	Great Britain	2:01.09	
13	8	Christophe Bordeau	France	2:01.46	
14	3	Frank Drost	Netherlands	2:01.59	
15	7	Satoshi Takeda	Japan	2:02.18	
16	4	Martin Roberts	Australia	2:04.28	

==== Final A ====
Rank	Lane	Name	Nationality	Time	Notes
1st place, gold medalist(s)	4	Michael Gross	West Germany	1:56.94	OR
2nd place, silver medalist(s)	6	Benny Nielsen	Denmark	1:58.24	NR
3rd place, bronze medalist(s)	5	Anthony Mosse	New Zealand	1:58.28	
4	1	Tom Ponting	Canada	1:58.91	
5	7	Melvin Stewart	United States	1:59.19	
6	3	David Wilson	Australia	1:59.20	
7	2	Jon Kelly	Canada	1:59.48	
8	8	Anthony Nesty	Suriname	2:00.80	
