= Swimming at the 1988 Summer Olympics – Women's 200 metre breaststroke =

Women's 200 metre breaststroke at the Games of the XXIV Olympiad
- Venue: Jamsil Indoor Swimming Pool
- Date: 20 September (heats); 21 September (finals)
- Competitors: 43 from 27 nations
- Winning time: 2:26.71 WR

Medalists
1st place, gold medalist(s)		Silke Hörner	East Germany
2nd place, silver medalist(s)		Huang Xiaomin	China
3rd place, bronze medalist(s)		Antoaneta Frenkeva	Bulgaria

The women's 200 metre breaststroke event at the 1988 Summer Olympics took place between 20 and 21 September at the Jamsil Indoor Swimming Pool in Seoul, South Korea.

== Records ==
Prior to this competition, the existing world and Olympic records were as follows.

World record	Allison Higson (CAN)	2:27.27	Montreal, Canada	28 May 1988
Olympic record	Lina Kačiušytė (URS)	2:29.54	Moscow, Soviet Union	23 July 1980

The following records were established during the competition:

Date	Round	Name	Nationality	Time	Record
20 September	Heat 6	Silke Hörner	East Germany	2:27.63	OR
21 September	Final A	Silke Hörner	East Germany	2:26.71	WR

== Results ==
=== Heats ===
Rule: The eight fastest swimmers advance to final A (Q), while the next eight to final B (q).

Rank	Heat	Name	Nationality	Time	Notes
1	6	Silke Hörner	East Germany	2:27.63	Q, OR
2	5	Yuliya Bogacheva	Soviet Union	2:28.94	Q
3	4	Antoaneta Frenkeva	Bulgaria	2:29.57	Q
4	6	Allison Higson	Canada	2:29.67	Q
5	5	Tanya Dangalakova	Bulgaria	2:29.91	Q
6	5	Huang Xiaomin	China	2:30.03	Q
7	4	Ingrid Lempereur	Belgium	2:30.07	Q
8	4	Manuela Dalla Valle	Italy	2:30.60	Q
9	6	Susanne Börnike	East Germany	2:30.71	q
10	4	Svetlana Kuzmina	Soviet Union	2:30.93	q
11	5	Linda Moes	Netherlands	2:31.98	q
12	6	Tracey McFarlane	United States	2:32.11	q
13	4	Annalisa Nisiro	Italy	2:32.77	q
14	6	Brigitte Becue	Belgium	2:33.13	q
15	6	Susan Rapp	United States	2:34.21	q
16	5	Guylaine Cloutier	Canada	2:34.36	q
17	4	Britta Dahm	West Germany	2:35.06	
18	3	Silvia Parera	Spain	2:35.57	
19	6	Yoshie Nishioka	Japan	2:35.81	
20	3	Suki Brownsdon	Great Britain	2:36.14	
21	5	Kornelia Stawicka	Poland	2:36.86	
22	6	Virginie Bojaryn	France	2:37.38	
23	5	Hiroko Nagasaki	Japan	2:37.44	
24	1	Karen Horning	Peru	2:37.84	
25	5	Pia Sørensen	Denmark	2:38.49	
26	4	Pascaline Louvrier	France	2:38.75	
27	3	Ragnheiður Runólfsdóttir	Iceland	2:39.10	
28	3	Dorota Chylak	Poland	2:39.38	
29	2	Park Sung-won	South Korea	2:39.40	
30	3	Lara Hooiveld	Australia	2:39.97	
31	2	Nancy Kemp-Arendt	Luxembourg	2:40.78	
32	3	Anamarija Petričević	Yugoslavia	2:40.80	
33	2	Helen Frank	Great Britain	2:41.12	
34	6	Heike Esser	West Germany	2:41.34	
35	1	Carwai Seto	Chinese Taipei	2:42.31	
36	2	Patricia Brülhart	Switzerland	2:42.82	
37	1	Montserrat Hidalgo	Costa Rica	2:44.72	
38	2	Sigrid Niehaus	Costa Rica	2:45.35	
39	3	Alicia María Boscatto	Argentina	2:45.80	
40	3	Chen Huiling	China	2:45.87	
41	2	Kimberly Chen	Chinese Taipei	2:50.84	
42	1	Dipika Chanmugam	Sri Lanka	2:51.60	
	2	Valentina Aracil	Argentina	DSQ	

=== Finals ===
==== Final B ====
Rank	Lane	Name	Nationality	Time	Notes
9	4	Susanne Börnike	East Germany	2:28.55	
10	5	Svetlana Kuzmina	Soviet Union	2:30.03	
11	3	Linda Moes	Netherlands	2:30.83	
12	2	Annalisa Nisiro	Italy	2:31.19	
13	1	Susan Rapp	United States	2:32.90	
14	6	Tracey McFarlane	United States	2:33.46	
15	8	Guylaine Cloutier	Canada	2:33.50	
16	7	Brigitte Becue	Belgium	2:34.10	

==== Final A ====
Rank	Lane	Name	Nationality	Time	Notes
1st place, gold medalist(s)	4	Silke Hörner	East Germany	2:26.71	WR
2nd place, silver medalist(s)	7	Huang Xiaomin	China	2:27.49	AS
3rd place, bronze medalist(s)	3	Antoaneta Frenkeva	Bulgaria	2:28.34	
4	2	Tanya Dangalakova	Bulgaria	2:28.43	
5	5	Yuliya Bogacheva	Soviet Union	2:28.54	
6	1	Ingrid Lempereur	Belgium	2:29.42	NR
7	6	Allison Higson	Canada	2:29.60	
8	8	Manuela Dalla Valle	Italy	2:29.86	
