= Mizumoto =

Mizumoto (written: 水本) is a Japanese surname. Notable people with the surname include:

- Hiroki Mizumoto (水本 裕貴, born 1985), Japanese footballer
- Katsunari Mizumoto (水本 勝成, born 1990), Japanese footballer
- Tetsuya Mizumoto, Japanese engineer
- Yoshiyuki Mizumoto (水本 良幸, born 1969), Japanese swimmer

== See also ==
- Mizumoto Park (水元公園, Mizumoto Kōen), a park in Katsushika ward, Tokyo, Japan
