= Swimming at the 1986 Asian Games =

- Venue: Jamsil Indoor Swimming Pool
- Dates: 21–26 September 1986

Swimming was contested at the 1986 Asian Games in Jamsil Indoor Swimming Pool, Seoul, South Korea from 21 September to 26 September 1986.

== Medalists ==
=== Men ===
Event	Gold		Silver		Bronze	
100 m freestyle	Katsunori Fujiwara; Japan	51.56; GR	Shen Jianqiang; China	51.69	Ang Peng Siong; Singapore	52.27
200 m freestyle	Katsunori Fujiwara; Japan	1:52.32; GR	Shigeo Ogata; Japan	1:53.26	Shen Jianqiang; China	1:53.36
400 m freestyle	Xie Jun; China	4:00.35; GR	Shigeo Ogata; Japan	4:01.57	Wang Dali; China	4:03.35
1500 m freestyle	Wang Dali; China	15:50.93; GR	Shigeo Ogata; Japan	15:51.33	He Runhua; China	16:17.03
100 m backstroke	Daichi Suzuki; Japan	57.39; GR	Shigemori Maruyama; Japan	57.98	Wang Hao; China	58.67
200 m backstroke	Kazuya Ikeda; Japan	2:05.13; GR	Lin Laijiu; China	2:07.15	Shigemori Maruyama; Japan	2:07.11
100 m breaststroke	Jin Fu; China	1:04.02; GR	Hisashi Fuwa; Japan	1:04.13	Kenji Watanabe; Japan	1:04.99
200 m breaststroke	Kenji Watanabe; Japan	2:20.07; GR	Naritoshi Matsuda; Japan	2:20.34	Wirmandi Sugriat; Indonesia	2:22.02
100 m butterfly	Hiroshi Miura; Japan	54.64; GR	Zheng Jian; China	55.13	Hiroshi Sato; Japan	55.37
200 m butterfly	Hiroshi Sato; Japan	2:01.06; GR	Khajan Singh; India	2:02.38	Yukinori Tanaka; Japan	2:02.99
200 m individual medley	Naritoshi Matsuda; Japan	2:05.48; GR	Chen Qin; China	2:08.83	Satoshi Takeda; Japan	2:09.07
400 m individual medley	Naritoshi Matsuda; Japan	4:27.99; GR	Satoshi Takeda; Japan	4:31.35	Tian Liang; China	4:42.06
4 × 100 m freestyle relay	China; Shen Jianqiang; Yang Qing; Mu Lati; Feng Qiangbiao	3:27.51; GR	Japan; Keisuke Okuno; Shigeo Ogata; Hiroshi Miura; Katsunori Fujiwara	3:29.78	Singapore; Ang Peng Siong; David Lim; Tay Khoon Hean; Oon Jin Gee	3:31.36
4 × 200 m freestyle relay	Japan; Keisuke Okuno; Shigeo Ogata; Tomohiro Noguchi; Katsunori Fujiwara	7:36.07; GR	China; Chen Suwei; He Runhua; Xie Jun; Wang Dali	7:49.38	Singapore; Oon Jin Gee; David Lim; Oon Jin Teik; Tay Khoon Hean	7:56.27
4 × 100 m medley relay	Japan; Daichi Suzuki; Hisashi Fuwa; Hiroshi Miura; Katsunori Fujiwara	3:46.55; GR	China; Wang Hao; Jin Fu; Zheng Jian; Shen Jianqiang	3:48.72	Indonesia; Lukman Niode; Wirmandi Sugriat; Sabeni Sudiono; Daniel Arief Budiman	3:55.85

=== Women ===
Event	Gold		Silver		Bronze	
100 m freestyle	Yoko Shimao; Japan	57.62; GR	Xia Fujie; China	58.23	Huang Hong; China	58.42
200 m freestyle	Chikako Nakamori; Japan	2:05.21; GR	Miki Saito; Japan	2:05.30	Nurul Huda Abdullah; Malaysia	2:06.24
400 m freestyle	Yan Ming; China	4:15.61; GR	Nurul Huda Abdullah; Malaysia	4:20.49	Miki Wakahoi; Japan	4:21.05
800 m freestyle	Yan Ming; China	8:43.42; GR	Nurul Huda Abdullah; Malaysia	8:50.44	Miki Wakahoi; Japan	8:50.45
100 m backstroke	Choi Yun-hui; South Korea	1:04.62; GR	Kaoru Ono; Japan	1:05.11	Naomi Sekido; Japan	1:05.96
200 m backstroke	Choi Yun-hui; South Korea	2:18.33; GR	Naomi Sekido; Japan	2:19.75	Hiroyo Harada; Japan	2:21.19
100 m breaststroke	Huang Xiaomin; China	1:12.70; GR	Hiroko Nagasaki; Japan	1:12.71	Xia Fujie; China	1:13.11
200 m breaststroke	Hiroko Nagasaki; Japan	2:34.01	Asako Natsume; Japan	2:37.62	Park Sung-won; South Korea	2:38.62
100 m butterfly	Qian Hong; China	1:01.36; GR	Yoko Kawahigashi; Japan	1:01.56	Kiyomi Takahashi; Japan	1:02.37
200 m butterfly	Izumi Kawahara; Japan	2:12.83; GR	Kiyomi Takahashi; Japan	2:13.53	Lee Eun-hee; South Korea	2:16.56
200 m individual medley	Naomi Sekido; Japan	2:21.02; GR	Hiroyo Harada; Japan	2:21.23	Choi Yun-hui; South Korea	2:22.30
400 m individual medley	Yan Ming; China	4:52.43; GR	Naomi Sekido; Japan	4:57.30	Nurul Huda Abdullah; Malaysia	4:57.73
4 × 100 m freestyle relay	China; Xia Fujie; Huang Hong; Zhou Xun; Qian Hong	3:52.21; GR	Japan; Yoko Shimao; Miki Wakahoi; Miki Saito; Chikako Nakamori	3:55.62	Hong Kong; Fenella Ng; Celeste Hung; Fu Mui; Suzanna Lee	4:03.65
4 × 100 m medley relay	Japan; Kaoru Ono; Hiroko Nagasaki; Yoko Kawahigashi; Yoko Shimao	4:16.07; GR	China; Zhou Xun; Huang Xiaomin; Qian Hong; Xia Fujie	4:16.75	South Korea; Choi Yun-hui; Park Sung-won; Lee Hong-mi; Kim Jin-suk	4:22.76

== Medal table ==
Rank	Nation	Gold	Silver	Bronze	Total
1	Japan (JPN)	17	18	10	45
2	China (CHN)	10	8	7	25
3	South Korea (KOR)	2	0	4	6
4	Malaysia (MAL)	0	2	2	4
5	India (IND)	0	1	0	1
6	Singapore (SIN)	0	0	3	3
7	Indonesia (INA)	0	0	2	2
8	Hong Kong (HKG)	0	0	1	1
Totals (8 entries)		29	29	29	87
