= Swimming at the 1990 Asian Games =

- Venue: Ying Tung Natatorium
- Dates: 23–28 September 1990

Swimming was contested at the 1990 Asian Games in National Olympics Sports Center, Beijing, China from September 23 to September 28, 1990.

== Medalists ==
=== Men ===
Event	Gold		Silver		Bronze	
50 m freestyle	Shen Jianqiang; China	22.99; GR	Ang Peng Siong; Singapore	23.33	Feng Qiangbiao; China	23.42
100 m freestyle	Shen Jianqiang; China	50.64; GR	Xie Jun; China	51.02	Richard Sam Bera; Indonesia	51.79
200 m freestyle	Xie Jun; China	1:51.90; GR	Tomohiro Noguchi; Japan	1:52.48	Wang Dali; China	1:52.56
400 m freestyle	Tomohiro Noguchi; Japan	3:56.32; GR	Takafumi Asahara; Japan	3:58.85	Yan Yumin; China	4:00.00
1500 m freestyle	Masayuki Fujimoto; Japan	15:43.24	Jeffrey Ong; Malaysia	15:46.90	Masashi Kato; Japan	15:49.71
100 m backstroke	Lin Laijiu; China	57.47	Hajime Itoi; Japan	57.79	Keita Soraoka; Japan	57.82
200 m backstroke	Ji Sang-jun; South Korea	2:03.59; GR	Keita Soraoka; Japan	2:03.88	Hajime Itoi; Japan	2:04.03
100 m breaststroke	Chen Jianhong; China	1:02.60; GR	Kenji Watanabe; Japan	1:03.12	Nobuyuki Kawaguchi; Japan	1:03.25
200 m breaststroke	Kenji Watanabe; Japan	2:17.49; GR	Nobuyuki Kawaguchi; Japan	2:19.84	Wirmandi Sugriat; Indonesia	2:20.06
100 m butterfly	Shen Jianqiang; China	54.29; GR	Kunio Sugimoto; Japan	55.37	Tomohiro Miyoshi; Japan	56.33
200 m butterfly	Kunio Sugimoto; Japan	2:00.25; GR	Tomohiro Miyoshi; Japan	2:00.50	Lee Yun-ahn; South Korea	2:01.23
200 m individual medley	Takahiro Fujimoto; Japan	2:05.50	Shuichi Nakamura; Japan	2:05.95	Xie Jun; China	2:06.35
400 m individual medley	Takahiro Fujimoto; Japan	4:26.10; GR	Shuichi Nakamura; Japan	4:30.79	Kim Seong-tae; South Korea	4:33.88
4 × 100 m freestyle relay	China; Xie Jun; Feng Qiangbiao; Wang Dali; Shen Jianqiang	3:24.96; GR	Japan; Masakatsu Usami; Ken Nakazawa; Hidetoshi Yamanaka; Katsunori Fujiwara	3:27.69	Singapore; Ang Peng Siong; Harold Gan; David Lim; Kenneth Yeo	3:31.46
4 × 200 m freestyle relay	Japan; Hidetoshi Yamanaka; Katsunori Fujiwara; Takafumi Asahara; Tomohiro Noguchi	7:30.34; GR	China; Yan Yumin; Wang Dali; Chen Suwei; Xie Jun	7:30.44	South Korea; Ji Sang-jun; Lim Cheol-seong; Kwon Sang-won; Lee Yun-ahn	7:46.83
4 × 100 m medley relay	China; Lin Laijiu; Chen Jianhong; Shen Jianqiang; Xie Jun	3:45.18; GR	Japan; Hajime Itoi; Kenji Watanabe; Kunio Sugimoto; Katsunori Fujiwara	3:47.98	South Korea; Ji Sang-jun; Yun Ju-il; Lee Yun-ahn; Kim Dong-hyeon	3:54.73

=== Women ===
Event	Gold		Silver		Bronze	
50 m freestyle	Yang Wenyi; China	25.86; GR	Sun Chunli; China	26.32	Naoko Imoto; Japan	26.45
100 m freestyle	Zhuang Yong; China	55.30; GR	Wang Xiaohong; China	56.10	Suzu Chiba; Japan	57.06
200 m freestyle	Zhuang Yong; China	2:01.43; GR	Suzu Chiba; Japan	2:02.27	Shen Xiaoyu; China	2:02.36
400 m freestyle	Yan Ming; China	4:13.55; GR	Shen Xiaoyu; China	4:14.25	Suzu Chiba; Japan	4:20.93
800 m freestyle	Yan Ming; China	8:40.27; GR	Shen Xiaoyu; China	8:42.01	Tomomi Hosoda; Japan	8:54.55
100 m backstroke	Yang Wenyi; China	1:03.83; GR	Lin Li; China	1:03.85	Satomi Oguri; Japan	1:04.45
200 m backstroke	Lin Li; China	2:13.81; GR	Wang Hui; China	2:16.66	Satomi Oguri; Japan	2:16.88
100 m breaststroke	Huang Xiaomin; China	1:10.08; GR	Kyoko Kasuya; Japan	1:11.55	Asako Natsume; Japan	1:12.41
200 m breaststroke	Lin Li; China	2:30.79; GR	Huang Xiaomin; China	2:31.02	Kyoko Kasuya; Japan	2:31.86
100 m butterfly	Wang Xiaohong; China	58.87; GR	Qian Hong; China	58.89	Yoko Kando; Japan	1:01.73
200 m butterfly	Wang Xiaohong; China	2:09.62; GR	Qian Hong; China	2:10.40	Rie Shito; Japan	2:13.98
200 m individual medley	Lin Li; China	2:13.16; GR	Fumie Kurotori; Japan	2:19.66	Xia Fujie; China	2:22.06
400 m individual medley	Lin Li; China	4:39.88; GR	Yan Ming; China	4:46.97	Fumie Kurotori; Japan	4:50.63
4 × 100 m freestyle relay	China; Zhuang Yong; Qian Hong; Wang Xiaohong; Yang Wenyi	3:46.39; GR	South Korea; Kim Eun-jeong; Myeong Kyeong-hyeon; Lee Moon-hee; Lee Eun-ju	3:56.81	Indonesia; Khim Tjia Fei; Meitri Widya Pangestika; Yen Yen Gunawan; Elfira Rosa Nasution	3:59.54
4 × 100 m medley relay	China; Yang Wenyi; Huang Xiaomin; Wang Xiaohong; Zhuang Yong	4:11.74; GR	Japan; Satomi Oguri; Kyoko Kasuya; Yoko Kando; Suzu Chiba	4:15.66	South Korea; Lee Chang-ha; Park Sung-won; Yoo Hong-mi; Kim Su-jin	4:25.50

== Medal table ==
Rank	Nation	Gold	Silver	Bronze	Total
1	China (CHN)	23	12	6	41
2	Japan (JPN)	7	16	16	39
3	South Korea (KOR)	1	1	5	7
4	Singapore (SIN)	0	1	1	2
5	Malaysia (MAL)	0	1	0	1
6	Indonesia (INA)	0	0	3	3
Totals (6 entries)		31	31	31	93
