= Gymnastics at the 1984 Summer Olympics – Men's floor =

Men's floor at the Games of the XXIII Olympiad
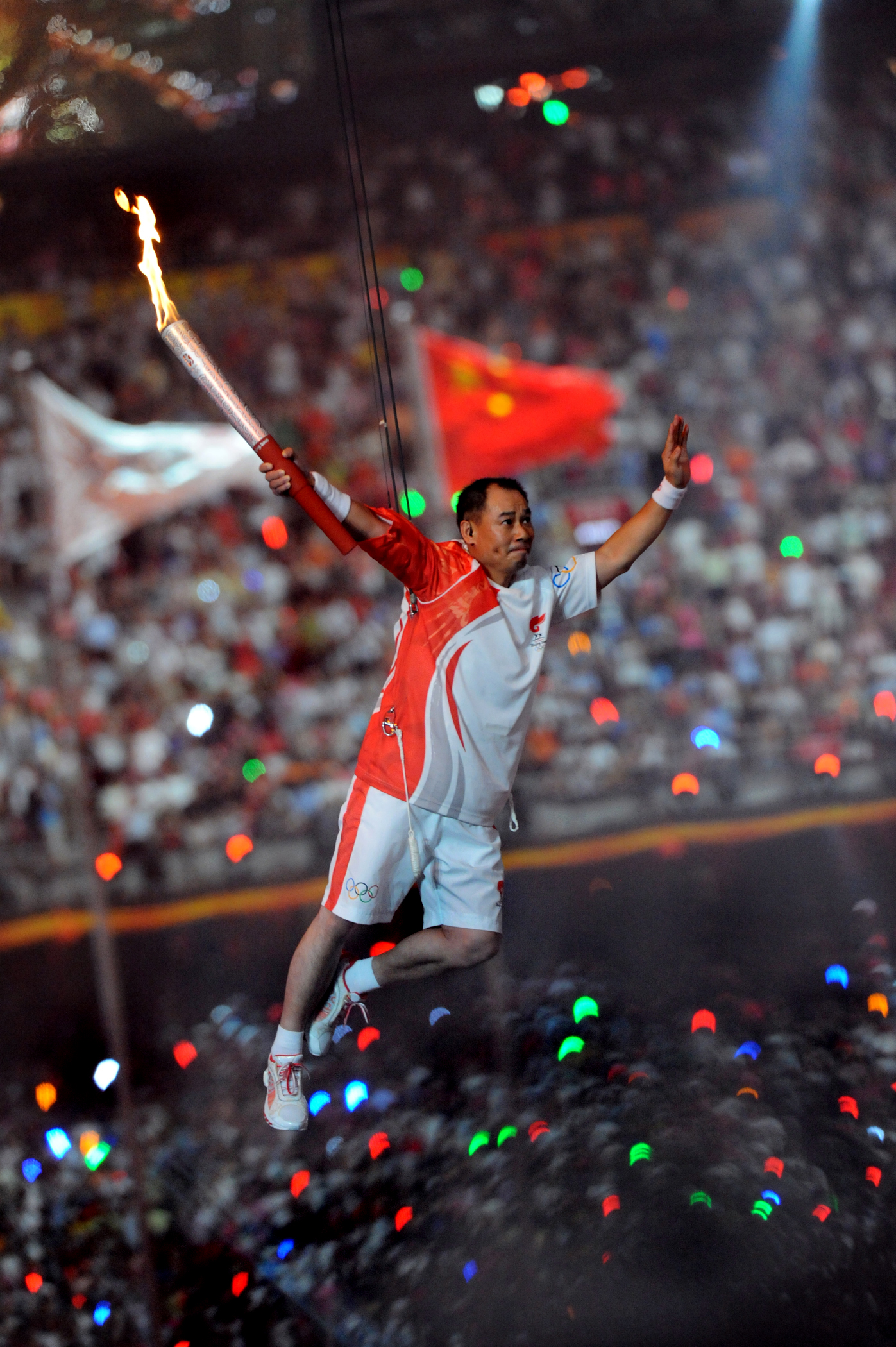
- Gold medalist Li Ning (2008)
- Venue: UCLA's Pauley Pavilion
- Date: July 29, 1984 (qualifying); 1 August 4, 1984 (final)
- Competitors: 8 from 5 nations
- Winning score: 19.925 points

Medalists
1st place, gold medalist(s)		Li Ning	China
2nd place, silver medalist(s)		Lou Yun	China
3rd place, bronze medalist(s)		Koji Sotomura	Japan
3rd place, bronze medalist(s)		Philippe Vatuone	France

These are the results of the men's floor competition, one of eight events for male competitors in artistic gymnastics at the 1984 Summer Olympics in Los Angeles. The qualification and final rounds took place on July 29, 31 and August 4 at UCLA’s Pauley Pavilion.

== Results ==
Seventy-one gymnasts competed in the compulsory and optional rounds on July 29 and 31. The eight highest scoring gymnasts advanced to the final on August 4. Each country was limited to two competitors in the final. Half of the points earned by each gymnast during both the compulsory and optional rounds carried over to the final. This constitutes the "prelim" score.

Rank	Gymnast	C	O	Prelim	Final	Total
Gold medal	Li Ning (CHN)	9.900	9.950	9.925	10.000	19.925
Silver medal	Lou Yun (CHN)	9.950	9.900	9.925	9.850	19.775
Bronze medal	Koji Sotomura (JPN)	9.800	9.900	9.850	9.850	19.700
Bronze medal	Philippe Vatuone (FRA)	9.800	9.900	9.850	9.850	19.700
5	Bart Conner (USA)	9.950	9.900	9.925	9.750	19.675
6	Valentin Pintea (ROU)	9.800	9.800	9.800	9.800	19.600
7	Peter Vidmar (USA)	9.800	9.800	9.800	9.750	19.550
8	Koji Gushiken (JPN)	9.800	9.900	9.850	9.600	19.450

Preceded by Gymnastics at the 1980 Summer Olympics – Men's floor	Men's Floor Event; 1984	Succeeded by Gymnastics at the 1988 Summer Olympics – Men's floor
