= Nagahata =

Nagahata (written: 長畑 or 永畑) is a Japanese surname. Notable people with the surname include:

- Hironobu Nagahata (長畑 弘伸, born 1969), Japanese swimmer
- Yuki Nagahata (永畑 祐樹, born 1989), Japanese footballer
