= Takizawa (surname) =

Takizawa (written: 滝沢, 滝澤 or 瀧澤) is a Japanese surname. Notable people with the surname include:

- Akihiro Takizawa (滝澤 明博; born 1961), Japanese biathlete
- Chise Takizawa (瀧澤千聖; born 2001), Japanese footballer
- Eisuke Takizawa (滝沢 英輔; 1902–1965), Japanese film director
- Hideaki Takizawa (滝沢 秀明; born 1982), Japanese actor and singer
- Hiroomi Takizawa (瀧澤 宏臣; born 1973), Japanese freestyle skier
- Karen Takizawa (滝沢 カレン; born 1992), Japanese model, television personality and actress
- Kumiko Takizawa (滝沢 久美子; born 1954), Japanese voice actress
- Kunihiko Takizawa (滝澤 邦彦; born 1978), Japanese footballer
- Nanae Takizawa (滝沢 ななえ; born 1987), Japanese volleyball player
- Nonami Takizawa (滝沢 乃南; born 1985), Japanese gravure idol, actress and singer
- Osamu Takizawa (滝沢 修; 1906–2000), Japanese actor
- Reiko Takizawa (滝澤 玲子; born 1962), Japanese volleyball player
- Shuhei Takizawa (瀧澤 修平; born 1993), Japanese footballer
- Taishi Takizawa (滝澤 大志; born 1985), Japanese professional wrestler

== Fictional characters ==
- Asuka Takizawa (滝沢あすか), character from the anime series Tropical-Rouge! Pretty Cure
