= Shigeo Ogata =

Japanese swimmer (born 1968)

Personal information
- Born: October 4, 1968 (age 57) Saga, Japan

Sport
- Sport: Swimming
Medal record
Representing Japan
Asian Games
| Gold medal – first place | 1986 Seoul | 4x200m freestyle relay |
| Silver medal – second place | 1986 Seoul | 200m freestyle |
| Silver medal – second place | 1986 Seoul | 400m freestyle |
| Silver medal – second place | 1986 Seoul | 1500m freestyle |
| Silver medal – second place | 1986 Seoul | 4x100m freestyle relay |

Shigeo Ogata (緒方 茂生, Ogata Shigeo) (born October 4, 1968) is a retired male freestyle swimmer from Japan. He represented his native country in three consecutive Summer Olympics, starting in 1984. His best Olympic result was the 5th place (3:49.91) in the Men's 4×100 metres Medley Relay event at the 1988 Summer Olympics, alongside Daichi Suzuki, Hironobu Nagahata and Hiroshi Miura.
