= Ōnogi =

Ōnogi, Onogi, Oonogi or Ohnogi (written: 大野木) is a Japanese surname. Notable people with the surname include:

- Ōnogi Hidejirō (大野木 秀次郎, 1895–1966), Japanese politician
- Hiroshi Ōnogi (大野木 寛, born 1959), Japanese screenwriter and novelist
- Tomoko Onogi (大野木 智子, born 1969), Japanese swimmer
