= Hironobu =

- Gender: Male

Origin
- Origin: Japanese
- Meaning: Different meanings depending on the kanji used

Hironobu (written 博信, 浩宣, 博允, 弘伸 or 裕信) is a masculine Japanese given name. Notable people with the name include:

- Hironobu Haga (芳賀 博信; born 1982), Japanese footballer
- Kachō Hironobu (華頂 博信; 1905–1970), Japanese prince
- Hironobu Kageyama (影山 浩宣; born 1961), Japanese singer and musician
- Hironobu Nagahata (長畑 弘伸; born 1979), Japanese swimmer
- Hironobu Ono (小野 博信; born 1987), Japanese footballer
- Hironobu Sakaguchi (坂口 博信; born 1962), Japanese video game designer, director and producer
- Hironobu Takesaki (竹崎 博允; born 1944), Japanese lawyer
- Hironobu Yasuda (安田 裕信; born 1983), Japanese racing driver
