= Ahmad Abdulla (disambiguation) =

Ahmad Abdulla (also spelled Ahmed or Abdullah) may refer to:

- Ahmad Jamil (footballer) (Ahmad Abdulla Jamil Abdulla Suroor), Emirati footballer
- Ahmed Abdulla, Mayalsian footballer
- Ahmad Abdullah, Malaysian politician
- Ahmed Abdullah, American trumpeter
- Ahmed Abdullah (swimmer), Egyptian swimmer
- Ahmed Abdullah (footballer), Emirati footballer
- Ahmed Safi Abdullah, Pakistani cricketer
- Ahmed Abdulla (Maldivian footballer)
- Ahmed Abdallah, Comorian politician
- Ahmad Abdalla, Egyptian film director
