= Wang Yajun =

Wang Yajun, may refer to:

- Wang Yajun (diplomat)
- Wang Yajun (volleyball player)
