= Xiaomin =

Xiaomin is a given name. Notable people with the name include:

- Chen Xiaomin (born 1977), female Chinese weightlifter
- Emperor Xiaomin of Northern Zhou (542 – 557), an emperor of the Chinese/Xianbei dynasty Northern Zhou
- Huang Xiaomin (born 1970), former breaststroke swimmer from China, Olympic silver medallist
- Peng Xiaomin (born 1973), Chinese chess grandmaster
