= Shigemori =

Shigemori (written: しげもり, 茂森 or 重森) is a Japanese surname. Notable people with the surname include:

- Ayumi Shigemori (茂森 あゆみ), Japanese actress
- Mirei Shigemori (重森 三玲), Japanese landscape architect

Shigemori (written: 繁守 or 重盛) is also a masculine Japanese given name. Notable people with the name include:

- Shigemori Maruyama (丸山 繁守; born 1967), Japanese swimmer
- Taira no Shigemori (平 重盛; 1138–1179)

== See also ==
- 4376 Shigemori, a main-belt asteroid
