= Zhan Jiang =

Zhan Jiang may refer to:

- Zhanjiang, a city in Guangdong province, Southern China
- Zhan Jiang (swimmer) (born 1968), Chinese former swimmer
