= Liu Hong =

Liu Hong may refer to:

- Emperor Houshao of Han (died 180 BC), personal name Liu Hong (劉弘), Western Han emperor
- Liu Hong (astronomer) (劉洪; 129–210), Eastern Han astronomer
- Emperor Ling of Han (156–189), personal name Liu Hong (劉宏), Eastern Han emperor
- Liu Hong (minister) (fl. 189) (劉弘), minister of works for 2 months during the reign of Emperor Ling of Han
- Liu Hong (劉弘), Liu Bei's father
- Liu Hong (Jin dynasty) (劉弘; 236–306), courtesy name Shuhe (叔和), Western Jin official
- Liu Hong (Liu Song) (劉宏; 434–458), courtesy name Xiudu (休度), Liu Song dynasty prince
- Liu Hong (politician) (刘洪), former director of the National Bureau of Statistics of China
- Liu Hong (racewalker) (刘虹; born 1987), race walker
- Liu Hong (cyclist) (born 1969), cyclist
