= Kawase (surname) =

Surname list

Kawase (written: 川瀬 or 河瀬) is a Japanese surname. Notable people with the surname include:

- Akiko Kawase (actress) (born 1980), Japanese voice actor
- Hasui Kawase (1883–1957), Japanese painter
- Maki Kawase (born 1995), Japanese voice actress
- Masataka Kawase (1840–1919), Japanese shishi (political activist) and diplomat
- Naomi Kawase (born 1969), Japanese film director
- Shiro Kawase (1889–1946), Japanese admiral
- Tokie Kawase (川瀬 時枝; born 1968), Japanese gymnast
- Tomoko Kawase (born 1975), Japanese singer
- Yukari Kawase (born 1967), Japanese volleyball player
