= Hiroyo =

- Gender: Female

Origin
- Origin: Japanese
- Meaning: Different meanings depending on the kanji used

Other names
- Alternative spelling: ひろよ (hiragana)

Hiroyo (written: 裕代 or 浩代) is a feminine Japanese given name. Notable people with the name include:

- Hiroyo Harada (原田 裕代; born 1970), Japanese swimmer
- Hiroyo Matsumoto (松本 浩代; born 1985), Japanese professional wrestler
