= Takayo =

- Gender: Female

Origin
- Origin: Japanese
- Meaning: Different meanings depending on the kanji used

Takayo (written: 高代, 恭代 or 貴代) is a feminine Japanese given name. Notable people with the name include:

- Takayo Fischer (born 1932), American actress
- Takayo Hashi (端 貴代; born 1977), Japanese mixed martial artist
- Takayo Kondo (近藤 高代; born 1975), Japanese pole vaulter
- Takayo Kitano (北野 高代; born 1971), Japanese swimmer
- Takayo Mimura (三村 恭代; born 1985), Japanese actress
- Takayo Siddle (born 1986), American basketball coach
