= Takemi Ise =

Japanese swimmer (born 1963)

Personal information
- Born: 22 December 1963 (age 62)

Sport
- Sport: Swimming
- Strokes: Butterfly
Medal record
Representing Japan
Asian Games
Gold medal – first place	1982 New Delhi	100m butterfly
Gold medal – first place	1982 New Delhi	4x100m medley relay
Silver medal – second place	1982 New Delhi	200m butterfly

Takemi Ise (伊勢 多恵美, Ise Takemi; born 22 December 1963) is a Japanese swimmer. She competed in the women's 100 metre butterfly at the 1984 Summer Olympics.
