= Keita Soraoka =

Japanese swimmer (born 1971)

Personal information
- Born: August 31, 1971 (age 54)

Sport
- Sport: Swimming
Medal record
Representing Japan
Asian Games
Silver medal – second place	1990 Beijing	200m backstroke
Bronze medal – third place	1990 Beijing	100m backstroke

Keita Soraoka (空岡 京太, Soraoka Keita) (born August 31, 1971) is a retired Japanese male backstroke swimmer. He represented Japan at the 1992 Summer Olympics in Barcelona, Spain. His best Olympic result was the 20th place (2:03.10) in the Men's 200m Backstroke event.
