= Ray Carey (swimmer) =

American swimmer (born 1973)

Ray Carey IV
Personal information
- Full name: Raymond E. Carey IV
- National team: United States
- Born: June 1, 1973 (age 53)
- Height: 5 ft 10 in (1.78 m)
- Weight: 161 lb (73 kg)

Sport
- Sport: Swimming
- Strokes: Butterfly
- Club: Bernal's Gators
- College team: Stanford University (BA 1995)
- Coach: Joe Bernal, Jon Lazar (Gators); Skip Kenney (Stanford)
Medal record
Men's swimming
Representing the United States
Summer Universiade
Gold medal – first place	1991 Sheffield	200 m butterfly

Raymond E. Carey IV (born June 1, 1973) is an American former competition swimmer, who competed for Stanford University, and participated in the 1996 Atlanta Olympics in the preliminaries of the men's 200-meter butterfly, but did not make the finals.

== Early life ==
Carey was born June 1, 1973, to father Ray Carey III and mother Diane, and grew up in greater Marblehead, Massachusetts. He began swimming by the age of seven with the Marblehead YMCA program. Carey was a graduate of St. John's Prep School in 1991, a Catholic boy's school in Danvers, Massachusetts, North of Boston, where his father taught history and was the track coach and his mother Diane taught biology. An accomplished coach with a long record of service, Carey's father Ray Carey III ran track for St. John's Prep and College of the Holy Cross, coached track at St. Johns for 39 years and was inducted into the Massachusetts State Track Association Hall of Fame in 1998.

=== Bernal's Gators ===
As early as age nine in 1982, according to a March 1991 bio piece in the Daily Item of Lynn, Massachusetts, future Olympian Ray Carey IV swam for Bernal's Gators in greater Boston, under Coach Joe Bernal and Assistant Coach Jon Lazar. A highly accomplished coach, Bernal founded the Gators in the 1970s and during Carey's tenure with the Gators, coached swimming at Harvard from 1977 to 1991, winning seven successive titles in the Ivy League Conference. Ray Carey decided not to swim with St. John's Prep's team, so he could focus exclusively on training with the Gators's highly competitive program. At 16, swimming for the Gators, Carey placed fourth at the U.S. National Championships in the 200 butterfly with a time of 2:00.25 around late July or early August, 1989. Carey usually trained with the Bernal Gators in Blodgett Pool in Cambridge, Massachusetts at Harvard, a reasonable commute of about 23 miles from Danvers, where he attended St. Johns Prep. Blodgett pool was a modern facility, currently containing a diving platform, a one and three meter springboard. A host to several regional championships for both the Ivy League and NCAA, the pool featured 9 50-meter and 14 25-meter lanes as of 2025. During the height of swimming season, Carey would often swim two sessions a day with the Gators, training once before school and once after school, in addition to running up to seven miles three times a week, and performing calisthenics. With double sessions, he averaged three hours a day with the Gators, training six days a week. Once he made the U.S. National Team at 16, Carey exclusively swam his signature event, the 200 butterfly.

=== International competition ===
In international competition, Carey captured the gold medal at the 1991 Universiade in Sheffield, Great Britain in his signature event, the 200 butterfly. He participated in butterfly events at the 1993 Pan Pacifics in Japan and 1995 Pan Pacific Championships in the U.S. but did not medal. He participated in the 200 butterfly at the 1994 FINA World Championships in Italy, placing 21st in a competitive field.

=== Stanford University ===
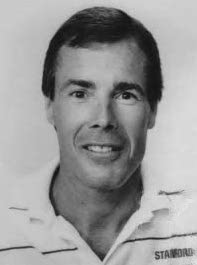
Stanford Coach Skip Kenney, 1988

Carey attended Stanford University, where he swam for the Stanford Cardinal swimming and diving team in National Collegiate Athletic Association (NCAA) and Pacific-10 Conference competition from 1992 to 1995 under Hall of Fame Head Coach Skip Kenney. Stanford won three consecutive NCAA national team championships while Carey was a Cardinal swimmer, and he won the individual NCAA national championship in the 200-yard butterfly with a time of 1:44.01 in 1993. Carey graduated from Stanford with a bachelor's degree in 1995, and a master's degree in 1996.

=== 1996 Olympic Trials ===
On March 8, 1996, as a Stanford Senior, Carey finished second to Tom Malchow in the 200 Butterfly finals with a time of 1:57.66 at the 1996 Olympic Trials in Indianapolis, Indiana at the Indiana University Natatorium, winning a berth on the 1996 Men's U.S. Olympic swimming team. At the time, Carey was rated fourth in the World in the event, though he would face demanding international competition at the Atlanta Olympics. Carey, an accomplished swimmer in High School, had placed fourth in the 1992 Olympic trials, failing to make the U.S. team, as only the first two finishers made the team.

== 1996 Atlanta Olympics ==
Carey represented the United States at the 1996 Summer Olympics in Atlanta, Georgia. He competed in the preliminary heats of the men's 200-meter butterfly event, and posted a time of 2:01.10, finishing twenty-first overall. Russian Dennis Pankratov won the 200-meter fly that year with a time of 1:56.51, with Carey's American teammate Tom Malchow taking the silver in 1:57.44, and Australian Scott Goodman taking the bronze with a time of 1:57.48. In the highly competitive international field, Carey finished about 3.62 seconds out of contending for the bronze medal, having swum a time 3.34 seconds slower than his time in the finals of the Olympic trials.

=== Post-swimming careers ===
Carey worked for Credit Suisse First Boston and at SlideRocket. Working for Azure Capital, primarily a venture capital firm, in 2001 he was announced as a partner. At Astute Solutions, an IT consulting and software development firm where he was Chief Operating Officer in 2016, and in 2018 was promoted to chief executive officer. Around 2020, he served as an executive with ArchiveSocial, an archiving platform for public records and social media. During his business career, he also spent time working as a co-owner and a board member of Kelly's Roast Beef in greater Boston. Carey married and had children.

== See also ==
- List of Stanford University people
