= Taihei Saka =

Japanese swimmer (born 1964)

Personal information
- National team: Japan
- Citizenship: Japan
- Born: March 31, 1964 (age 62)

Sport
- Sport: Swimming
Medal record
Representing Japan
Asian Games
Gold medal – first place	1982 New Delhi	100m butterfly
Gold medal – first place	1982 New Delhi	200m butterfly
Gold medal – first place	1982 New Delhi	4x200m freestyle relay
Gold medal – first place	1982 New Delhi	4x100m medley relay
Silver medal – second place	1982 New Delhi	4x100m freestyle relay

Taihei Saka (坂 大平, Saka Taihei; born 31 March 1964) is a former Japanese swimmer who competed in the 1984 Summer Olympics.
