= Annalisa Nisiro =

Italian swimmer

Personal information
- Born: 11 May 1973 (age 53) Faenza, Italy

Sport
- Sport: Swimming

Annalisa Nisiro (born 11 May 1973) is an Italian former swimmer. She competed in the women's 200 metre breaststroke at the 1988 Summer Olympics.
