= Dan Kutler =

Israeli swimmer (born 1970)

Personal information
- Native name: דן קוטלר
- Born: May 2, 1970 (age 56) Mountain View, California, U.S.

Sport
- Country: Israel (Olympic Team)
- Sport: Swimming
- Event(s): butterfly, freestyle
- College team: U. California Los Angeles
- Coach: Ron Ballatore
Medal record
Men's swimming
Summer Universiade
Representing the United States
Gold medal – first place	1991 Sheffield	4x100m Medley
Bronze medal – third place	1991 Sheffield	100m Butterfly

Dan Kutler (Hebrew: דן קוטלר; born May 2, 1970) is an American-born former swimmer and butterfly specialist, who swam for UCLA and participated for Israel in the 1996 Olympics in Atlanta.

Kutler was born in Mountain View, California, on May 2, 1970. He is Jewish and grew up in Santa Clara, California.

== University of California Los Angeles ==
He competed for UCLA from 1988 to 1992 under Hall of Fame Coach Ron Ballatore, where he was a 7-time All American. Kutler's teams at UCLA were perennial top-ten contenders in NCAA national competition. Considered one of the Pac-10 Conference’s top sprinters and relay members while at UCLA, he represented the United States at the 1991 FISU World University Games in England, where he won a bronze medal in the 100-Meter Butterfly, and a gold medal for the 400-Meter Medley Relay Team.

== 1996 Atlanta Olympics ==
After completing UCLA, Kutler moved to Israel in 1994 to begin swimming for their national team in preparation for the 1996 Olympics in Atlanta. In Atlanta, he swam the butterfly leg for the four-man 4x100 meter medley with Yoav Bruck, Eitan Urbach, and Vadim Alexeev. The team reached the final, taking eighth place. He retired after the Olympics.

He captured a silver medal at the Men's 50-meter Butterfly with a time of 24.71 in France on March 2, 1996 at the FINA Swimming World Cup, and took the a bronze in the Men's 50-meter Butterfly, with a time of 24.40 on October 2, 1996 at the FINA World Cup in Germany.

In 1997 he was inducted into the Southern California Jewish Sports Hall of Fame.

== See also ==
- List of select Jewish swimmers
