= Li Zhongyi (swimmer) =

Chinese swimmer

Personal information
- Born: March 21, 1963 (age 63)

Sport
- Sport: Swimming
- Strokes: Backstroke, medley
Medal record
Representing China
Asian Games
Gold medal – first place	1982 New Delhi	200m individual medley
Gold medal – first place	1982 New Delhi	4x100m freestyle relay
Silver medal – second place	1982 New Delhi	4x200m freestyle relay
Silver medal – second place	1982 New Delhi	4x100m medley relay

Li Zhongyi (born 21 March 1963) is a Chinese former backstroke and medley swimmer, who competed in the 1984 Summer Olympics.
