= Lynne Wilson =

British swimmer

Personal information
- Born: 5 January 1969 (age 57) Sunderland, England

Sport
- Sport: Swimming

Lynne Wilson (born 5 January 1969) is a British swimmer. She competed in the women's 200 metre butterfly at the 1988 Summer Olympics.
