= Keisuke Okuno =

Japanese swimmer (born 1965)

Personal information
- Born: December 9, 1965 (age 60)

Sport
- Sport: Swimming
Medal record
Representing Japan
Asian Games
Gold medal – first place	1986 Seoul	4x200m freestyle relay
Silver medal – second place	1982 New Delhi	1500m freestyle
Silver medal – second place	1986 Seoul	4x100m freestyle relay

Keisuke Okuno (奥野 景介, Okuno Keisuke; born 9 December 1965) is a former Japanese swimmer who competed in the 1984 Summer Olympics.

He has been an associate professor in Waseda University since 2002. He is coaching Masato Sakai.
