= Kyoko Kasuya =

Japanese swimmer (born 1975)

Personal information
- Full name: Kyoko Kasuya
- Nationality: Japan
- Born: August 31, 1975 (age 50) Saitama, Japan
- Height: 1.65 m (5 ft 5 in)
- Weight: 52 kg (115 lb)

Sport
- Sport: Swimming
- Strokes: Breaststroke
Medal record
Women's swimming
Representing Japan
Pan Pacific Championships
| Bronze medal – third place | 1991 Edmonton | 200 m breaststroke |
| Bronze medal – third place | 1991 Edmonton | 4x100 m medley |
| Bronze medal – third place | 1993 Kobe | 4x100 m medley |
Asian Games
| Silver medal – second place | 1990 Beijing | 100 m breaststroke |
| Silver medal – second place | 1990 Beijing | 4x100 m medley |
| Bronze medal – third place | 1990 Beijing | 200 m breaststroke |

Kyoko Kasuya (粕谷 恭子, Kasuya Kyōko; born 31 August 1975) is a Japanese former swimmer who competed in the 1992 Summer Olympics.
