= Satoshi Sumida =

Japanese swimmer (born 1962)

Personal information
- Born: 16 December 1962 (age 63)

Sport
- Sport: Swimming
Medal record
Representing Japan
Asian Games
Gold medal – first place	1982 New Delhi	4x100m medley relay
Silver medal – second place	1982 New Delhi	4x100m freestyle relay

Satoshi Sumida (隅田 敏司, Sumida Satoshi; born 16 December 1962) is a former Japanese swimmer who competed in the 1984 Summer Olympics.
