= Miki Saito =

Japanese swimmer (born 1968)

Personal information
- Born: June 7, 1968 (age 58)

Sport
- Sport: Swimming
Medal record
Representing Japan
Asian Games
Silver medal – second place	1986 Seoul	200m freestyle
Silver medal – second place	1986 Seoul	4x100m freestyle relay

Miki Saito (斉藤 美紀, Saitō Miki; born 7 June 1968) is a Japanese former swimmer who competed in the 1984 Summer Olympics.
