= Helen Gouldby =

British swimmer

Personal information
- Born: 14 May 1968 (age 58) Bristol, England

Sport
- Sport: Swimming

Helen Gouldby (née Bewley; born 14 May 1968) is a retired British swimmer and swimming coach.

Gouldby was educated at Millfield School. Gouldby, then known by her birth name of Helen Bewley, competed in the women's 200 metre butterfly at the 1988 Summer Olympics. She represented England in the 200 metres butterfly, at the 1986 Commonwealth Games in Edinburgh, Scotland. She also won the 1986 and 1987 ASA National British Championships title in the 200 metres butterfly.
