= Swimming at the 1982 Asian Games =

- Venue: Talkatora Swimming Pool
- Dates: 21–29 November 1982

Swimming was contested at the 1982 Asian Games in Talkatora Swimming Pool, New Delhi, from 21–29 November 1982.

== Medalists ==
=== Men ===
Event	Gold		Silver		Bronze	
100 m freestyle	Ang Peng Siong; Singapore	53.00; GR	Wan Qiang; China	54.12	Lukman Niode; Indonesia	54.18
200 m freestyle	William Wilson; Philippines	1:57.41	Wu Jinhuang; China	1:58.16	Huang Guohua; China	1:58.23
400 m freestyle	Ikuhiro Terashita; Japan	4:08.71	William Wilson; Philippines	4:10.05	Wu Jinhuang; China	4:10.30
1500 m freestyle	Kimihiro Anzai; Japan	16:21.82	Keisuke Okuno; Japan	16:31.89	William Wilson; Philippines	16:38.30
100 m backstroke	Kenji Ikeda; Japan	59.91; GR	Hidetoshi Takahashi; Japan	1:00.28	Lukman Niode; Indonesia	1:00.51
200 m backstroke	Hidetoshi Takahashi; Japan	2:08.33; GR	Yang Xintian; China	2:11.31	Lukman Niode; Indonesia	2:13.06
100 m breaststroke	Ye Runcheng; China	1:05.93	Shigehiro Takahashi; Japan	1:05.97	Jin Fu; China	1:06.45
200 m breaststroke	Naritoshi Matsuda; Japan	2:25.99	Jin Fu; China	2:26.66	Shigehiro Takahashi; Japan	2:27.99
100 m butterfly	Taihei Saka; Japan	57.27; GR	Chen Chao; China	58.35	Ang Peng Siong; Singapore	58.37
200 m butterfly	Taihei Saka; Japan	2:04.97; GR	Bang Jun-young; South Korea	2:06.82	Masakazu Hirata; Japan	2:07.06
200 m individual medley	Li Zhongyi; China	2:10.93	Keiichi Ohata; Japan	2:11.87	Shinji Ito; Japan	2:16.12
400 m individual medley	Keiichi Ohata; Japan	4:39.86; GR	Pan Jiazhang; China	4:45.26	Shinji Ito; Japan	4:52.52
4 × 100 m freestyle relay	China; Huang Guohua; Huang Guangliang; Wan Qiang; Li Zhongyi	3:33.74; GR	Japan; Satoshi Sumida; Takuya Osumi; Ikuhiro Terashita; Taihei Saka	3:38.40	Indonesia; Zain Chaidir; John David Item; Gerald Item; Lukman Niode	3:41.05
4 × 200 m freestyle relay	Japan; Ikuhiro Terashita; Takuya Osumi; Akifumi Nishimuta; Taihei Saka	7:49.76	China; Huang Guohua; Wu Jinhuang; Pan Jiazhang; Li Zhongyi	7:50.74	Indonesia; Ridwan Muis; John David Item; Gerald Item; Lukman Niode	8:15.03
4 × 100 m medley relay	Japan; Kenji Ikeda; Shigehiro Takahashi; Taihei Saka; Satoshi Sumida	3:56.48; GR	China; Yang Xintian; Ye Runcheng; Chen Chao; Li Zhongyi	3:57.02	Indonesia; Lukman Niode; Faezal Mulyawan; John David Item; Gerald Item	4:03.69

=== Women ===
Event	Gold		Silver		Bronze	
100 m freestyle	Kaori Yanase; Japan	57.88; GR	Chikako Nakamori; Japan	1:00.39	Li Sha; China	1:01.15
200 m freestyle	Kaori Yanase; Japan	2:06.12; GR	Mika Saito; Japan	2:09.75	Li Miaohe; China	2:11.34
400 m freestyle	Mika Saito; Japan	4:25.72; GR	Junko Sakurai; Japan	4:27.67	Lee See-eun; South Korea	4:34.02
800 m freestyle	Naomi Sekido; Japan	9:03.05; GR	Junko Sakurai; Japan	9:10.47	Lee See-eun; South Korea	9:20.92
100 m backstroke	Choi Yun-hui; South Korea	1:06.39; GR	Choi Yun-jung; South Korea	1:06.98	Koto Maeda; Japan	1:08.24
200 m backstroke	Choi Yun-hui; South Korea	2:21.96; GR	Choi Yun-jung; South Korea	2:22.85	Hisae Asari; Japan	2:27.36
100 m breaststroke	Hiroko Nagasaki; Japan	1:12.73; GR	Kim Myong-suk; North Korea	1:14.85	Shao Hong; China	1:15.15
200 m breaststroke	Hiroko Nagasaki; Japan	2:33.78; GR	Kim Myong-suk; North Korea	2:43.22	Liang Weifen; China	2:45.46
100 m butterfly	Takemi Ise; Japan	1:02.22; GR	Kiyomi Takahashi; Japan	1:02.69	Lin Fan; China	1:04.81
200 m butterfly	Kiyomi Takahashi; Japan	2:16.63	Takemi Ise; Japan	2:16.81	Kim Kum-hee; South Korea	2:21.79
200 m individual medley	Choi Yun-hui; South Korea	2:24.32; GR	Hideka Koshimizu; Japan	2:25.45	Shared silver	
200 m individual medley	Choi Yun-hui; South Korea	2:24.32; GR	Choi Yun-jung; South Korea	2:25.45	Shared silver	
400 m individual medley	Hideka Koshimizu; Japan	5:02.79; GR	Naomi Sekido; Japan	5:07.09	Lee See-eun; South Korea	5:08.26
4 × 100 m freestyle relay	Japan; Yumi Okazaki; Chikako Nakamori; Mika Saito; Kaori Yanase	3:59.27; GR	China; Li Miaohe; Bao Hong; Lin Fan; Li Sha	4:05.82	Singapore; Lai May May; Gillian Chee; Mavis Ee; Chan Mui Pin	4:12.02
4 × 100 m medley relay	Japan; Koto Maeda; Hiroko Nagasaki; Takemi Ise; Kaori Yanase	4:21.32; GR	China; Zhang Zhixin; Shao Hong; Lin Fan; Bao Hong	4:32.46	South Korea; Choi Yun-hui; Kwen Woo-jung; Kim Kum-hee; Choi Yun-jung	4:34.05

== Medal table ==
Rank	Nation	Gold	Silver	Bronze	Total
1	Japan (JPN)	21	13	6	40
2	China (CHN)	3	10	8	21
3	South Korea (KOR)	3	4	5	12
4	Philippines (PHI)	1	1	1	3
5	Singapore (SIN)	1	0	2	3
6	North Korea (PRK)	0	2	0	2
7	Indonesia (INA)	0	0	6	6
Totals (7 entries)		29	30	28	87
