= Tim Jones (swimmer) =

British swimmer (born 1967)

Personal information
- Born: 16 January 1967 (age 59) Birmingham, England

Sport
- Sport: Swimming

Tim Jones (born 16 January 1967) is a male retired British swimmer.

== Swimming career ==
Jones competed in the men's 200 metre butterfly at the 1988 Summer Olympics. He represented England in the 200 metres butterfly, at the 1986 Commonwealth Games in Edinburgh, Scotland. Four years later he represented England in the 100 and 200 metres butterfly, at the 1990 Commonwealth Games in Auckland, New Zealand. He also won the 1988 ASA National Championship title in the 200 metres butterfly.
