= Heike Esser =

German swimmer

Personal information
- Born: 4 July 1973 (age 53) Bedburg, West Germany

Sport
- Sport: Swimming

Heike Esser (born 4 July 1973) is a German swimmer. She competed in the women's 200 metre breaststroke at the 1988 Summer Olympics representing West Germany.
