= Hideka Koshimizu =

Japanese swimmer (born 1964)

Personal information
- Born: 16 October 1964 (age 61)

Sport
- Sport: Swimming
- Strokes: Medley
Medal record
Representing Japan
Asian Games
Gold medal – first place	1982 New Delhi	400m individual medley
Silver medal – second place	1982 New Delhi	200m individual medley

Hideka Koshimizu (輿水 秀香, Koshimizu Hideka; born 16 October 1964) is a Japanese swimmer. She competed in two events at the 1984 Summer Olympics.
