= Shinji Ito =

Japanese swimmer (born 1963)

Personal information
- Born: June 11, 1963 (age 63)

Sport
- Sport: Swimming
Medal record
Representing Japan
Asian Games
Bronze medal – third place	1982 New Delhi	200m individual medley
Bronze medal – third place	1982 New Delhi	400m individual medley

Shinji Ito (伊東 慎治, Itō Shinji; born 11 June 1963) is a Japanese former swimmer who competed in the 1984 Summer Olympics in the 200 m and 400 m individual medleys.
