= Naomi Sekido =

Japanese swimmer (born 1969)

Personal information
- Born: 18 March 1969 (age 57)

Sport
- Sport: Swimming
Medal record
Representing Japan
Asian Games
| Gold medal – first place | 1982 New Delhi | 800m freestyle |
| Gold medal – first place | 1986 Seoul | 200m individual medley |
| Silver medal – second place | 1986 Seoul | 200m backstroke |
| Silver medal – second place | 1986 Seoul | 400m individual medley |
| Bronze medal – third place | 1986 Seoul | 100m backstroke |

Naomi Sekido (関戸 直美, Sekido Naomi; born 18 March 1969) is a Japanese swimmer. She competed in three events at the 1984 Summer Olympics.
