= Junko Sakurai =

Japanese former swimmer (born 1967)

Personal information
- Born: December 10, 1967 (age 58)

Sport
- Sport: Swimming
Medal record
Representing Japan
Asian Games
Silver medal – second place	1982 New Delhi	400m freestyle
Silver medal – second place	1982 New Delhi	800m freestyle

Junko Sakurai (桜井 純子, Sakurai Junko; born 10 December 1967) is a Japanese former swimmer who competed in the 1984 Summer Olympics.
