= Helen Frank (swimmer) =

British swimmer (born 1971)

Personal information
- Born: 1 July 1971 (age 55) Leeds, England

Sport
- Sport: Swimming

Helen Frank (born 1 January 1971) is a British international swimmer. She was a member of the City of Leeds Swimming Club. She competed in the women's 200 metre breaststroke at the 1988 Summer Olympics in Seoul, South Korea.

Frank was also selected as a member of the England National Youth Squad (1985 -1986) and the Sun Life England Intermediate Squad (1988). She participated in the European Junior Championships, West Berlin, Germany, in 1986.

After her international swimming career, Frank studied Physiotherapy at Leeds Metropolitan University, completed a work placement at the Birmingham Children’s Hospital and embarked on a career in the National Health Service.

Frank became a lecturer in Physiotherapy at the University of Birmingham and is currently the Deputy Head for the School of Allied Health and Community at the University of Worcester.
