= Swimming at the 1991 Summer Universiade =

Swimming at the XVI Summer Universiade
- Venues: Ponds Forge
- Dates: 15 July 1991 – 21 July 1991

The swimming competition at the 1991 Summer Universiade took place in Sheffield, Great Britain from July 15 to July 21, 1991.

== Men's events ==
Event	Gold		Silver		Bronze	
50 m freestyle	Stéphan Caron; France	22.97	Robert Pufleb; Germany	23.15	Krzysztof Cwalina; Poland Eric Hansen; United States	23.20
100 m freestyle	Stéphan Caron; France	49.72	Axel Hickmann; Germany	50.81	Robert Pufleb; Germany	51.19
200 m freestyle	Stéphan Caron; France	1:50.24	Artur Wojdat; Poland	1:50.69	Turlough O'Hare; Canada	1:51.22
400 m freestyle	Artur Wojdat; Poland	3:52.55	Peter Wright; United States	3:54.47	Vladimir Belov; Soviet Union	3:55.11
1500 m freestyle	Ian Wilson; Great Britain	15:15.30	Jeffrey Ong; Malaysia	15:23.61 NR	Christopher Bowie; Canada	15:31.87
100 m backstroke	Deke Botsford; Canada	56.40	Tripp Schwenk; United States	56.70	Scott Johnson; United States	56.78
200 m backstroke	Tripp Schwenk; United States	2:00.38	Kevin Draxinger; Canada	2:00.92	Dmitriy Haritonov; Soviet Union	2:01.73
100 m breaststroke	Brian Pajer; United States	1:03.21	Chen Jianhong; China	1:03.59	Leif Heg; United States	1:04.20
200 m breaststroke	Gary O'Toole; Ireland	2:16.75	Ty Richardson; United States	2:17.42	Preston Staats; United States	2:18.92
100 m butterfly	Shen Jianqiang; China	54.25	Andrey Kozirev; Soviet Union	54.78	Dan Kutler; United States	54.84
200 m butterfly	Ray Carey; United States	1:58.36	Brian Gunn; United States	1:59.48	Kunio Sugimoto; Japan	2:03.01
200 m individual medley	Greg Burgess; United States	2:03.90	Matt Stahlman; United States	2:04.67	Takahiro Fujimoto; Japan	2:04.71
400 m individual medley	Takahiro Fujimoto; Japan	4:23.10 NR	Greg Burgess; United States	4:24.53	Brent Harding; Australia	4:26.20
4 × 100 m freestyle relay	United States (USA); Keith Anderson; Josh Davis; Eric Hansen; Alyn Towne	3:22.73	France (FRA)	3:23.48	Germany (GER)	3:23.61
4 × 200 m freestyle relay	Soviet Union (URS)	7:23.28	United States (USA); Josh Davis; Vince Giambalvo; Dan Kanner; Greg Larson	7:24.54	Canada (CAN)	7:32.89
4 × 100 m medley relay	United States (USA); Eric Hansen; Dan Kutler; Brian Pajer; Tripp Schwenk	3:44.33	Germany (GER)	3:44.65	Soviet Union (URS)	3:45.76

Legend: CR – Championship record; NR – National record

== Women's events ==
Event	Gold		Silver		Bronze	
50 m freestyle	Yang Wenyi; China	25.92 CR	Zhuang Yong; China	26.10	Jenifer Boyd; United States	26.14
100 m freestyle	Zhuang Yong; China	56.28	Wang Xiaohong; China	56.87	Andrea Nugent; Canada	57.31
200 m freestyle	Karen Kraemer; United States	2:02.23	Patricia Noall; Canada	2:02.99	Natalia Trefilova; Soviet Union	2:03.68
400 m freestyle	Patricia Noall; Canada	4:16.74	Jana Shamarova; Soviet Union	4:17.15	Sionainn Marcoux; United States	4:18.03
800 m freestyle	Francesca Ferrarini; Italy	8:43.55	Marie-Pierre Wirth; France	8:47.98	Sionainn Marcoux; United States	8:48.53
100 m backstroke	Barbara Bedford; United States	1:02.08 CR	Kristina Stinson; United States	1:03.70	Niecia Freeman; Australia	1:04.47
200 m backstroke	Lin Li; China	2:15.12	Laura Savarino; Italy	2:16.54	Kristina Stinson; United States	2:16.65
100 m breaststroke	Guylaine Cloutier; Canada	1:10.93	Yelena Volkova; Soviet Union	1:11.19	Katherine Hedman; United States	1:11.98
200 m breaststroke	Svetlana Kuzmina; Soviet Union	2:31.60	Lin Li; China	2:31.72	Yelena Volkova; Soviet Union	2:32.03
100 m butterfly	Wang Xiaohong; China	1:00.00	Qian Hong; China	1:00.21	Kristin Stoudt; United States	1:02.69
200 m butterfly	Wang Xiaohong; China	2:10.76	Yumiko Ichioka; Japan	2:14.30	Mojca Cater; Canada	2:15.57
200 m individual medley	Lin Li; China	2:14.22 CR	Alicja Pęczak; Poland	2:18.84	Marie-Pierre Wirth; France	2:20.83
400 m individual medley	Lin Li; China	4:42.58 CR	Sheila Taormina; United States	4:52.10	Patricia Noall; Canada	4:52.17
4 × 100 m freestyle relay	China (CHN)	3:46.41 CR	United States (USA); Dyne Burrell; Grace Cornelius; Melanie Morgan; Julie Sommer	3:47.48	Canada (CAN)	3:49.73
4 × 200 m freestyle relay	Soviet Union (URS)	8:14.48	United States (USA); Dyne Burrell; Karen Kraemer; Sionainn Marcoux; Amy Ward	8:14.54	Canada (CAN)	8:28.20
4 × 100 m medley relay	United States (USA); Barbara Bedford; Katherine Hedman; Melanie Morgan; Kristin Stoudt	4:11.70	Canada (CAN)	4:15.25	Soviet Union (URS)	4:17.32

Legend: CR – Championship record; NR – National record

== Medal table ==
Rank	Nation	Gold	Silver	Bronze	Total
1	United States (USA)	9	11	11	31
2	China (CHN)	9	5	0	14
3	Canada (CAN)	3	3	8	14
4	Soviet Union (URS)	3	3	6	12
5	France (FRA)	3	2	1	6
6	Poland (POL)	1	2	1	4
7	Japan (JPN)	1	1	2	4
8	Italy (ITA)	1	1	0	2
9	Great Britain (GBR)	1	0	0	1
9	Ireland (IRL)	1	0	0	1
11	Germany (GER)	0	3	2	5
12	Malaysia (MAS)	0	1	0	1
13	Australia (AUS)	0	0	2	2
Totals (13 entries)		32	32	33	97
