= Tomohiro Miyoshi =

Japanese swimmer (born 1970)

Tomohiro Mitoshi
Personal information
- National team: Japan
- Born: July 13, 1970 (age 55) Kanagawa, Japan

Sport
- Sport: Swimming
- Strokes: Butterfly
Medal record
Representing Japan
Asian Games
Silver medal – second place	1990 Beijing	200m butterfly
Bronze medal – third place	1990 Beijing	100m butterfly

Tomohiro Miyoshi (三好 智弘, Miyoshi Tomohiro) (born July 13, 1970, in Kanagawa, Japan) is a retired Japanese male butterfly swimmer. He represented Japan at the 1992 Summer Olympics. His best result in two individual starts in Barcelona, Spain was the 17th place (2:01.27) in the Men's 200m Butterfly event.
