= Lou Yaping =

Chinese swimmer

Personal information
- Born: March 13, 1971 (age 55)

Sport
- Sport: Swimming

Lou Yaping (Chinese: 樓亞萍; born 13 March 1971) is a Chinese former freestyle swimmer who competed in the 1988 Summer Olympics.
