= Chen Jianhong =

Chinese swimmer (born 1969)

Personal information
- Full name: Chen Jianhong
- Nationality: Chinese
- Born: January 20, 1969 (age 57) China
- Height: 1.85 m (6 ft 1 in)
- Weight: 85 kg (187 lb)

Sport
- Sport: Swimming
- Strokes: Breaststroke
Medal record
Men's swimming
Representing China
Pan Pacific Championships
Bronze medal – third place	1989 Tokyo	100 m breaststroke
Asian Games
Gold medal – first place	1990 Beijing	100 m breaststroke
Gold medal – first place	1990 Beijing	4x100 m medley
Summer Universiade
Silver medal – second place	1991 Sheffield	100 m breaststroke

Chen Jianhong (born 20 January 1969) is a Chinese former swimmer who competed in the 1988 Summer Olympics and in the 1992 Summer Olympics.
