= Park Sung-won (swimmer) =

South Korean swimmer (born 1972)

Personal information
- Born: 18 January 1972 (age 54)

Sport
- Sport: Swimming
- Strokes: breaststroke
Medal record
Representing South Korea
Asian Games
Bronze medal – third place	1986 Seoul	200m breaststroke
Bronze medal – third place	1986 Seoul	4x100m medley relay
Bronze medal – third place	1990 Beijing	4x100m medley relay

- Park Sung-won
- Hangul: 박성원
- Hanja: 朴晟媛
- RR: Bak Seongwon
- MR: Pak Sŏngwŏn

Park Sung-won (Korean: 박성원; Hanja: 朴晟媛 ; born 18 January 1972) is a South Korean breaststroke swimmer. She competed in three events at the 1988 Summer Olympics.
