= Tetsuya Mizumoto =

Tetsuya Mizumoto is an engineer from the Tokyo Institute of Technology, Japan. He was named a Fellow of the Institute of Electrical and Electronics Engineers (IEEE) in 2012 for his contributions to waveguide optical nonreciprocal devices for optical communications.
