= Yuji Kasama =

Japanese volleyball player (born 1959)

Personal information
- Full name: 笠間 裕治 Kasama Yūji
- Born: 2 July 1959 (age 67) Yanagawa, Fukuoka, Japan
- Height: 1.94 m (6 ft 4 in)

Volleyball information
- Position: Middle blocker
- Number: 1
Honours
Men's volleyball
Representing Japan
Goodwill Games
Bronze medal – third place	1986 Moscow

Yuji Kasama (born 2 July 1959) is a Japanese former volleyball player. Kasama competed in the men's tournament at the 1988 Summer Olympics in Seoul, where he finished in tenth place. He competed at the 1986 Goodwill Games in Moscow and won a bronze medal.
