= Li Yaguang =

Chinese basketball player

Li Yaguang 李亚光
Personal information
- Born: 8 June 1958 (age 68) Zhenjiang, Jiangsu, China
- Listed height: 6.16 ft 0 in (1.88 m)

Career information
- Playing career: 1975–1988

Career history

Coaching
- 1988: China Men U18
- 1991–1993: China Women
- 2005: China Women U20
Medals
Men's basketball
Representing China
FIBA Asia Cup
Gold medal – first place	1983 Hong Kong
Bronze medal – third place	1985 Kuala Lumpur
Asian Games
Gold medal – first place	1986 Seoul

Li Yaguang (born 8 June 1958) is a Chinese former basketball player who competed in the 1984 Summer Olympics and in the 1988 Summer Olympics.

== Career ==
After the retirement from basketball player, Li started his coaching career in 1988. In 1991, Li was appointed as the coach of China women's national basketball team. In 1993, Li left his position and became the deputy director of Sichuan Sport Bureau in next year. In 1996, Li was appointed as the deputy director of Chongqing Sport Bureau. In 2002, Li was appointed as the vice president of Chinese Basketball Association. In 2018, Li was retired from his position.

== Investigation ==
On 2 February 2023, he was put under investigation for alleged "serious violations of discipline and laws" by the Central Commission for Discipline Inspection (CCDI), the party's internal disciplinary body, and the National Supervisory Commission, the highest anti-corruption agency of China.
