= Feng Qiangbiao =

Chinese swimmer (born 1965)

Personal information
- Born: March 20, 1965 (age 61)

Sport
- Sport: Swimming
Medal record
Representing China
Asian Games
Gold medal – first place	1986 Seoul	4x100m freestyle relay
Gold medal – first place	1990 Beijing	4x100m freestyle relay
Bronze medal – third place	1990 Beijing	50m freestyle

Feng Qiangbiao (Chinese: 馮強標, born 20 March 1965) is a Chinese former swimmer who competed in the 1988 Summer Olympics.
