= Takahiro Kasahara =

Japanese sprinter

Personal information
- Nationality: Japanese
- Born: 31 July 1967 (age 58)

Sport
- Sport: Sprinting
- Event: 100 metres
Medal record
Men's athletics
Representing Japan
Asian Championships
Silver medal – second place	1995 Jakarta	4×400 m

Takahiro Kasahara (笠原 隆弘, Kasahara Takahiro; born 31 July 1967) is a Japanese sprinter. He competed in the men's 100 metres at the 1988 Summer Olympics.
