= Yasunori Kumada =

Japanese volleyball player (born 1963)

Personal information
- Full name: 熊田 康則 Kumada Yasunori
- Born: 18 March 1963 (age 63) Kanagawa, Japan
- Height: 1.93 m (6 ft 4 in)

Volleyball information
- Position: Opposite
- Number: 3

National team
- Years: Team
- 1985–1988: Japan
Honours
Men's volleyball
Representing Japan
Goodwill Games
| Bronze medal – third place | 1986 Moscow |

Yasunori Kumada (born 18 March 1963) is a Japanese former volleyball player. Kumada competed in the men's tournament at the 1988 Summer Olympics in Seoul, where he finished in tenth place. He competed at the 1986 Goodwill Games in Moscow and won a bronze medal.
