= Huang Guoxiong =

Chinese swimmer

Personal information
- Born: October 9, 1970 (age 55)

Sport
- Sport: Swimming
- Strokes: Backstroke

Huang Guoxiong (born 9 October 1970) is a Chinese former swimmer who competed in the 1988 Summer Olympics.
