= Kenji Watanabe =

Japanese swimmer (1969–2017)

Personal information
- Born: July 17, 1969
- Died: September 18, 2017 (aged 48)

Sport
- Sport: Swimming
- Strokes: Breaststroke
Medal record
Representing Japan
Asian Games
Gold medal – first place	1986 Seoul	200m breaststroke
Gold medal – first place	1990 Beijing	200m breaststroke
Silver medal – second place	1990 Beijing	100m breaststroke
Silver medal – second place	1990 Beijing	4x100m medley relay
Bronze medal – third place	1986 Seoul	100m breaststroke

Kenji Watanabe (渡辺 健司, Watanabe Kenji; July 17, 1969 – September 18, 2017) was a Japanese breaststroke swimmer. He represented his native country in three consecutive Summer Olympics, starting in 1984. His best Olympic result was the 7th place (2:14.70) in the Men's 200m Breaststroke event at the 1992 Summer Olympics in Barcelona, Spain. He was the grandson of Hisakichi Toyoda, who won a gold medal in the 4 × 200 m freestyle in the 1932 Summer Olympics.

At the 1986 Asian Games in Seoul, Watanabe won the gold medal in the 200m breaststroke and the bronze medal in the 100m breaststroke.

Watanabe again won gold in the 200m breaststroke at the 1990 Asian Games in Beijing. He also won silver medals in the 100m breaststroke and the 4 × 100 m medley relay.

Watanabe died at his home on September 18, 2017 at 48 years old.
