= Xie Jun (swimmer) =

Chinese swimmer (born 1968)

Personal information
- Native name: 謝軍
- Born: December 31 1968
- Died: February 2006
- Height: 183 cm (6 ft 0 in)

Sport
- Sport: Swimming
- Strokes: Freestyle, individual medley
Medal record
Men's swimming
Representing China
Asian Games
Gold medal – first place	1986 Seoul	400 m freestyle
Gold medal – first place	1990 Beijing	200 m freestyle
Gold medal – first place	1990 Beijing	4×100 m freestyle
Gold medal – first place	1990 Beijing	4×100 m medley
Silver medal – second place	1986 Seoul	4×200 m freestyle
Silver medal – second place	1990 Beijing	100 m freestyle
Silver medal – second place	1990 Beijing	4×200 m freestyle
Bronze medal – third place	1990 Beijing	200 m medley

Xie Jun (Chinese: 謝軍; born 31 December 1968) is a Chinese former swimmer who competed in the 1988 Summer Olympics and in the 1992 Summer Olympics.
