= Isao Yamagishi =

Japanese diver

Personal information
- Nationality: Japanese
- Born: 19 August 1966 (age 58)

Sport
- Sport: Diving

Isao Yamagishi (山岸 勲, Yamagishi Isao, born 19 August 1966) is a Japanese diver. He competed at the 1984 Summer Olympics, the 1988 Summer Olympics and the 1992 Summer Olympics.
