= Tadahiro Kosaka =

Japanese racewalker (born 1960)

Personal information
- Born: February 10, 1960 (age 66) Wakayama, Japan

Sport
- Sport: Race walking
Medal record
Representing Japan
Asian Games
Bronze medal – third place	1990 Beijing	50 km
Bronze medal – third place	1994 Hiroshima	50 km

Tadahiro Kosaka (Japanese: 小坂 忠広; born February 10, 1960) is a retired Japanese male race walker. He competed for Japan at three consecutive Summer Olympics: 1988, 1992, and 1996.

== International competitions ==
Representing Japan
Year	Competition	Venue	Position	Event	Notes
1988	Olympic Games	Seoul, South Korea	47th	20 km	
1988	Olympic Games	Seoul, South Korea	31st	50 km	
1990	Asian Games	Beijing, China	3rd	50 km	
1991	World Championships	Tokyo, Japan	13th	50 km	
1992	Olympic Games	Barcelona, Spain	24th	50 km	
1994	Asian Games	Hiroshima, Japan	3rd	50 km	
1996	Olympic Games	Atlanta, United States	29th	50 km	
