= Yukinori Tanaka =

Japanese swimmer (born 1966)

Personal information
- Born: April 5, 1966 (age 60)

Sport
- Sport: Swimming
- Strokes: Butterfly
Medal record
Representing Japan
Asian Games
Bronze medal – third place	1986 Seoul	200m butterfly

Yukinori Tanaka (田中 穂徳, Tanaka Yukinori; born 5 April 1966) is a former Japanese swimmer who competed in the 1988 Summer Olympics.
