= Mojca Cater =

Canadian swimmer

Personal information
- Full name: Mojca Cater
- National team: Canada
- Born: February 12, 1970 (age 56) Toronto, Ontario
- Height: 1.65 m (5 ft 5 in)
- Weight: 53 kg (117 lb)

Sport
- Sport: Swimming
- Strokes: Butterfly
- Club: Etobicoke Swim Club
Medal record
Women's swimming
Representing Canada
Summer Universiade
Bronze medal – third place	1991 Sheffield	200 m butterfly

Mojca Cater-Herman (born February 12, 1970) is a former butterfly swimmer from Canada.

Cater competed for her native country at the 1988 Summer Olympics in Seoul, South Korea where she finished in ninth position in the 200-metre butterfly, clocking 2:12.66 in the B-Final.

In 2008, she was inducted into the Ontario Aquatics Hall of Fame for "making outstanding contributions to aquatic sport in Canada".
