= Miyako Yamashita =

Japanese volleyball player (born 1962)

Personal information
- Born: 6 December 1962 (age 63); Uonuma, Niigata, Japan
- Height: 1.62 m (5 ft 4 in)

Volleyball information
- Position: Outside hitter
- Number: 4

National team
1988	Japan

Miyako Yamashita (Japanese: 山下 美弥子; born 6 December 1962) is a Japanese former volleyball player who competed in the 1988 Summer Olympics in Seoul.

In 1988 she finished fourth with the Japanese team in the Olympic tournament.
