= Wen Fan =

Chinese water polo player

Personal information
- Nationality: Chinese
- Born: 20 February 1960 (age 65)

Sport
- Sport: Water polo

Wen Fan (born 20 February 1960) is a Chinese water polo player. He competed in the men's tournament at the 1988 Summer Olympics.
