= Gymnastics at the 1988 Summer Olympics – Men's floor =

Men's floor at the Games of the XXIV Olympiad
- Pictogram for Gymnastics

Medalists
| 1st place, gold medalist(s) | | Sergei Kharkov | Soviet Union |
| 2nd place, silver medalist(s) | | Vladimir Artemov | Soviet Union |
| 3rd place, bronze medalist(s) | | Lou Yun | China |
| 3rd place, bronze medalist(s) | | Yukio Iketani | Japan |

These are the results of the men's floor competition, one of eight events for male competitors in artistic gymnastics at the 1988 Summer Olympics in Seoul. The qualification and final rounds took place on September 18, 20 and 24th at the Olympic Gymnastics Hall.

== Results ==
=== Qualification ===
Eighty-seven gymnasts competed in the floor event during the compulsory and optional rounds on September 18 and 20. The eight highest scoring gymnasts advanced to the final on September 24. Each country was limited to two competitors in the final. Half of the points earned by each gymnast during both the compulsory and optional rounds carried over to the final. This constitutes the "prelim" score.

=== Final ===
| Rank | GymnastGymnast | C | O | C+O | Prelim | Final | Total |
|---|---|---|---|---|---|---|---|
| Gold medal | Sergei Kharkov (URS) | 9.900 | 10.000 | 19.900 | 9.950 | 9.975 | 19.925 |
| Silver medal | Vladimir Artemov (URS) | 9.950 | 9.950 | 19.900 | 9.950 | 9.950 | 19.900 |
| Bronze medal | Lou Yun (CHN) | 9.950 | 9.950 | 19.900 | 9.950 | 9.900 | 19.850 |
| Bronze medal | Yukio Iketani (JPN) | 9.900 | 9.900 | 19.800 | 9.900 | 9.950 | 19.850 |
| 5 | Li Ning (CHN) | 9.900 | 9.950 | 19.850 | 9.925 | 9.875 | 19.800 |
| 6 | Boris Preti (ITA) | 9.900 | 9.900 | 19.800 | 9.900 | 9.875 | 19.775 |
| 7 | Kalofer Hristozov (BUL) | 9.900 | 9.900 | 19.800 | 9.900 | 9.850 | 19.750 |
| 8 | Curtis Hibbert (CAN) | 9.900 | 9.850 | 19.750 | 9.875 | 9.650 | 19.525 |
