= Masaki Kaito =

Japanese volleyball player (born 1963)

Personal information
- Full name: 海藤 正樹 Kaitō Masaki
- Born: 24 September 1963 (age 63); Japan
- Height: 1.92 m (6 ft 4 in)

Volleyball information
- Position: Opposite
- Number: 11

National team
1985–1988	Japan
Honours
Men's volleyball
Representing Japan
Goodwill Games
Bronze medal – third place	1986 Moscow

Masaki Kaito (born 24 September 1963) is a Japanese former volleyball player. Kaito competed in the men's tournament at the 1988 Summer Olympics in Seoul, where he finished in tenth place. He competed at the 1986 Goodwill Games in Moscow and won a bronze medal.
