= Ahmed Abdullah (swimmer) =

Egyptian swimmer

Personal information
- Born: 29 June 1968 (age 58) Mansoura, Egypt

Sport
- Sport: Swimming

Ahmed Abdullah (born 29 June 1968) is an Egyptian swimmer. He competed in the men's 200 metre butterfly at the 1988 Summer Olympics.
