= Jin Fu =

Chinese swimmer (born 1964)

Personal information
- Born: September 25, 1964 (age 61)

Sport
- Sport: Swimming
- Strokes: Breaststroke
Medal record
Representing China
Asian Games
Gold medal – first place	1986 Seoul	100m breaststroke
Silver medal – second place	1982 New Delhi	200m breaststroke
Silver medal – second place	1986 Seoul	4x100m medley relay
Bronze medal – third place	1982 New Delhi	100m breaststroke

Jin Fu (born 25 September 1964) is a Chinese former swimmer who competed in the 1984 Summer Olympics and in the 1988 Summer Olympics.
