= Xia Fujie =

Chinese swimmer (born 1970)

Personal information
- Born: June 23, 1970 (age 56)

Sport
- Sport: Swimming
- Strokes: Freestyle, breaststroke, medley
Medal record
Representing China
Asian Games
Gold medal – first place	1986 Seoul	4x100m freestyle relay
Silver medal – second place	1986 Seoul	100m freestyle
Silver medal – second place	1986 Seoul	4x100m medley relay
Bronze medal – third place	1986 Seoul	100m breaststroke
Bronze medal – third place	1990 Beijing	200m individual medley

Xia Fujie (Chinese: 夏福杰; pinyin: Xià Fújié; born 23 June 1970) is a Chinese former swimmer who competed in the 1988 Summer Olympics.

She now coaches the Albuquerque Dolphins.
