= Hideharu Hara =

Japanese volleyball player (born 1965)

Personal information
- Born: 22 March 1965 (age 61); Kirishima, Japan
- Height: 1.85 m (6 ft 1 in)

Volleyball information
- Position: Outside hitter
- Number: 8

National team
| 1986–1988 | Japan |
Honours
Men's volleyball
Representing Japan
Goodwill Games
| Bronze medal – third place | 1986 Moscow |

Hideharu Hara (born 22 March 1965) is a Japanese former volleyball player. Hara competed in the men's tournament at the 1988 Summer Olympics in Seoul, where he finished in tenth place. He competed at the 1986 Goodwill Games in Moscow and won a bronze medal.
