= Wang Yajun (volleyball player) =

Chinese volleyball player

Personal information
- Born: 27 August 1962 (age 64)
- Height: 182 cm (6 ft 0 in)

Volleyball information
- Position: Outside hitter
- Number: 5

National team
- Years: Team
- 1987–1988: China
Honours
Women's volleyball
Representing China
Olympic Games
Bronze medal – third place	1988 Seoul	Team

Wang Yajun (simplified Chinese: 汪亚君; traditional Chinese: 汪亞君; pinyin: Wāng Yàjūn, born 27 August 1962) is a Chinese former volleyball player who competed in the 1988 Summer Olympics in Seoul.
