= Shen Jianqiang =

Chinese swimmer (born 1964)

Personal information
- Full name: Shen Jianqiang
- Nationality: Chinese
- Born: August 5, 1964 (age 62) China
- Height: 1.81 m (5 ft 11 in)
- Weight: 85 kg (187 lb)

Sport
- Sport: Swimming
- Strokes: Freestyle, Butterfly
Medal record
Men's swimming
Representing China
Asian Games
Gold medal – first place	1990 Beijing	50 m freestyle
Gold medal – first place	1990 Beijing	100 m freestyle
Gold medal – first place	1990 Beijing	100 m butterfly
Gold medal – first place	1990 Beijing	4x100 m freestyle
Gold medal – first place	1990 Beijing	4x100 m medley
Summer Universiade
Gold medal – first place	1991 Sheffield	100 m butterfly

Shen Jianqiang (born 5 August 1964) is a Chinese former swimmer who competed in the 1984 Summer Olympics, in the 1988 Summer Olympics, and in the 1992 Summer Olympics. Zhou Ming was his coach during the peak of his swimming career.
