= Hiroyo Harada =

Japanese swimmer (born 1970)

Personal information
- Native name: 原田 裕代
- National team: Japan
- Born: July 11, 1970 (age 55)
- Height: 162 cm (5 ft 4 in)
- Weight: 50 kg (110 lb)

Sport
- Sport: Swimming
- Strokes: Backstroke, individual medley
Medal record
Women's swimming
Representing Japan
Asian Games
Silver medal – second place	1986 Seoul	200 m individual medley
Bronze medal – third place	1986 Seoul	200 m backstroke

Hiroyo Harada (原田 裕代, Harada Hiroyo; born 11 July 1970) is a Japanese former medley swimmer who competed in the 1988 Summer Olympics.
