= Yukari Kawase =

Japanese volleyball player (born 1967)

Personal information
- Born: 2 March 1967 (age 59)
- Height: 1.82 m (6 ft 0 in)

Volleyball information
- Position: Middle blocker
- Number: 9

National team
- Years: Team
- 1985–1988: Japan

Yukari Kawase (Japanese: 川瀬 ゆかり; born 2 March 1967) is a Japanese former volleyball player who competed in the 1988 Summer Olympics in Seoul.

In 1988, she finished fourth with the Japanese team in the Olympic tournament.
