= Satoshi Takeda =

Japanese swimmer (born 1968)

Personal information
- Born: June 10, 1968 (age 58)

Sport
- Sport: Swimming
Medal record
Representing Japan
Asian Games
Silver medal – second place	1986 Seoul	400m individual medley
Bronze medal – third place	1986 Seoul	200m individual medley

Satoshi Takeda (武田 聡, Takeda Satoshi; born 10 June 1968) is a former Japanese swimmer who competed in the 1988 Summer Olympics.
