= Chen Huiling =

Chinese swimmer

Personal information
- Born: April 2, 1971 (age 55)

Sport
- Sport: Swimming
- Strokes: Breaststroke

Chen Huiling (born 2 April 1971) is a Chinese former breaststroke swimmer who competed in the 1988 Summer Olympics.
