= Yoshie Nishioka =

Japanese swimmer (born 1974)

Personal information
- Born: July 11, 1974 (age 51)

Sport
- Sport: Swimming
- Strokes: Backstroke, breaststroke, medley
Medal record
Representing Japan
Summer Universiade
Silver medal – second place	1993 Buffalo	200m breaststroke
Silver medal – second place	1993 Buffalo	4x100m medley relay
Silver medal – second place	1995 Fukuoka	4x100m medley relay

Yoshie Nishioka (西岡 由恵, Nishioka Yoshie; born 11 July 1974) is a Japanese former swimmer who competed in the 1988 Summer Olympics.
