= Yoshiyuki Mizumoto =

Japanese swimmer

Personal information
- Born: February 18, 1969 (age 57)

Sport
- Sport: Swimming
- Strokes: Freestyle, medley

Yoshiyuki Mizumoto (水本 良幸, Mizumoto Yoshiyuki; born 18 February 1969) is a former Japanese swimmer who competed in the 1988 Summer Olympics.
