= Reiko Takizawa =

Japanese volleyball player (born 1962)

Personal information
- Born: 19 June 1962 (age 64)
- Height: 1.63 m (5 ft 4 in)

Volleyball information
- Position: Setter
- Number: 3

National team
1988	Japan

Reiko Takizawa (Japanese: 滝澤 玲子; born 19 June 1962) is a Japanese former volleyball player who competed in the 1988 Summer Olympics in Seoul.

In 1988, she finished fourth with the Japanese team in the Olympic tournament.
