= Shigemori Maruyama =

Japanese swimmer (born 1967)

Personal information
- Born: August 2, 1967 (age 58)

Sport
- Sport: Swimming
Medal record
Representing Japan
Asian Games
Silver medal – second place	1986 Seoul	100m backstroke
Bronze medal – third place	1986 Seoul	200m backstroke

Shigemori Maruyama (丸山 繁守, Maruyama Shigemori; born 2 August 1967) is a former Japanese backstroke swimmer who competed in the 1988 Summer Olympics.
