= Tomoko Onogi =

Japanese swimmer

Personal information
- Born: December 6, 1969 (age 56)

Sport
- Sport: Swimming
- Strokes: Backstroke

Tomoko Onogi (大野木 智子, Ōnogi Tomoko; born 6 December 1969) is a Japanese former swimmer who competed in the 1988 Summer Olympics.
