= Hiroko Nagasaki =

Japanese swimmer (born 1968)

Personal information
- Nationality: Japanese
- Born: 27 July 1968 Akita, Akita, Japan
- Height: 169 cm (5 ft 7 in)
- Weight: 60 kg (132 lb)

Sport
- Sport: Swimming
- Strokes: Breaststroke
- Club: Akita Athletic Club
- College team: University of California, Berkeley; Brigham Young University
Medal record
Women's swimming
Representing Japan
Pan Pacific Championships
Silver medal – second place	1985 Tokyo	100 m breaststroke
Gold medal – first place	1985 Tokyo	200 m breaststroke
Bronze medal – third place	1985 Tokyo	4×100 m medley relay
Asian Games
Gold medal – first place	1982 New Delhi	100 m breaststroke
Gold medal – first place	1982 New Delhi	200 m breaststroke
Gold medal – first place	1982 New Delhi	4 × 100 m medley relay
Silver medal – second place	1986 Seoul	100 m breaststroke
Gold medal – first place	1986 Seoul	200 m breaststroke
Gold medal – first place	1986 Seoul	4 × 100 m medley relay

Hiroko Nagasaki (長崎 宏子, Nagasaki Hiroko; born 27 July 1968) is a Japanese former swimmer who competed in the 1984 Summer Olympics and in the 1988 Summer Olympics. She won the 100m breaststroke event at New Delhi Asiad in 1982.

Nagasaki was named to the Japanese national swimming team at the age of twelve, making her the team's first ever primary school student. However she did not participate in the 1980 Summer Olympics in Moscow as Japan joined the boycott of the games in response to the Soviet invasion of Afghanistan. After the 1984 Summer Olympics, she dropped out of Akita Kita High School to study abroad, first at the University of California, Berkeley, and later at Brigham Young University. Along with Kim Chen and Atlee Mahorn, she was one of three UC Berkeley students who competed for non-US teams at the 1988 Summer Olympics.

Nagasaki retired from swimming after the 1988 games and worked for the Japanese Olympic Committee (JOC). In 1995, she married Ryōichi Kasuga, her former boss at the JOC. The couple went on to have three daughters. She was one of the torchbearers in the Akita leg of the 2020 Summer Olympics torch relay.

== See also ==
- Akita Prefectural General Pool
