= Mo Wanlan =

Chinese swimmer

Personal information
- Born: January 4, 1974 (age 52)

Sport
- Sport: Swimming

Mo Wanlan (born 4 January 1974) is a Chinese former swimmer who competed in the 1988 Summer Olympics.
