= Liu Hong (cyclist) =

Chinese cyclist (born 1969)

Personal information
- Born: 11 May 1969 (age 57)

Cycling career
- Sport: Cycling

Liu Hong (刘宏, born 11 May 1969) is a Chinese former cyclist. He competed in two events at the 1988 Summer Olympics.
