= Zhan Jiang (swimmer) =

Chinese swimmer

Personal information
- Born: April 29, 1968 (age 58)

Sport
- Sport: Swimming
- Strokes: Butterfly

Michael Zhan Jiang (born 29 April 1968) is a Chinese former swimmer who competed in the 1988 Summer Olympics. 29 Times China National Champions In Butterfly Event. Lifetime Member Of American Swimming Coaches Association.
