= Hiroshi Miura =

Japanese swimmer (born 1966)

Personal information
- Born: June 22, 1966 (age 60)

Sport
- Sport: Swimming
Medal record
Representing Japan
Asian Games
Gold medal – first place	1986 Seoul	100m butterfly
Gold medal – first place	1986 Seoul	4x100m medley relay
Silver medal – second place	1986 Seoul	4x100m freestyle relay

Hiroshi Miura (三浦 広司, Miura Hiroshi; born 22 June 1966) is a former Japanese swimmer who competed in the 1988 Summer Olympics.
