= Wang Xiaohong (swimmer) =

Chinese swimmer (born 1968)

Medal record

Women's swimming

Representing China

Olympic Games
Silver medal – second place	1992 Barcelona	200 m butterfly

World Championships (LC)
Silver medal – second place	1991 Perth	100 m butterfly

Summer Universiade
Gold medal – first place	1991 Sheffield	100 m butterfly
Gold medal – first place	1991 Sheffield	200 m butterfly
Silver medal – second place	1991 Sheffield	100 m freestyle

Wang Xiaohong (simplified Chinese: 王晓红; traditional Chinese: 王曉紅; pinyin: Wáng Xiǎohóng; born November 20, 1968, in Changzhou, Jiangsu) is a female Chinese swimmer. She competed in two consecutive Summer Olympics for her native country, starting in 1988. She won the silver medal in the women's 200m butterfly event at the 1992 Summer Olympics in Barcelona, Spain.
