= Takayo Kitano =

Japanese swimmer

Personal information
- Born: September 27, 1971 (age 54)

Sport
- Sport: Swimming
- Strokes: Butterfly

Takayo Kitano (北野 高代, Kitano Takayo; born 27 September 1971) is a Japanese former butterfly swimmer who competed in the 1988 Summer Olympics.
