= Hironobu Nagahata =

Japanese swimmer

Personal information
- Born: May 22, 1969 (age 57)

Sport
- Sport: Swimming
- Strokes: Breaststroke

Hironobu Nagahata (長畑 弘伸, Nagahata Hironobu; born 22 May 1969) is a former Japanese swimmer who competed in the 1988 Summer Olympics.
