= Huang Xiaomin =

Chinese swimmer (born 1970)

Personal information
- Born: April 14, 1970 (age 56) Qiqihar, Heilongjiang, China
Medal record
Women's swimming
Representing China
Olympic Games
Silver medal – second place	1988 Seoul	200 m breaststroke
Pan Pacific Championships
Silver medal – second place	1987 Brisbane	200 m breaststroke
Bronze medal – third place	1987 Brisbane	100 m breaststroke

Huang Xiaomin (simplified Chinese: 黄晓敏; traditional Chinese: 黃曉敏; pinyin: Huáng Xiǎomǐn; born April 14, 1970) is a Chinese former breaststroke swimmer, whose best performance during her career was winning the silver medal in the 200 m breaststroke at the 1988 Summer Olympics in Seoul, South Korea. She was born in Qiqihar, Heilongjiang. She admitted to have used doping substances during her active career and is now publicly opposed to it.
