= List of Asian Games medalists in basketball =

This is the complete list of Asian Games medalists in basketball from 1951 to 2026.

== Basketball ==
=== Men ===
Games	Gold	Silver	Bronze
1951 New Delhi	Philippines (PHI); Francisco Calilan; Andres dela Cruz; Genaro Fernandez; Jose Gochangco; Rafael Hechanova; Moro Lorenzo; Carlos Loyzaga; Antonio Martinez; Lauro Mumar; Ignacio Ramos; Meliton Santos; Mariano Tolentino	Japan (JPN); Makoto Arai; Mitsugu Hachiya; Hiroshi Ikeda; Junichi Iwao; Michio Katayama; Fumio Matsuoka; Kasaburo Ogura; Shuzo Okubo; Shigeru Saito; Minoru Takahashi; Mitsuhide Tsudi	Iran (IRN); Hassan Khaleghpour; Kamal Mashhoun; Reza Masoumi; Kambiz Mokhberi; Alireza Oshar; Hossein Razi; Mashallah Safiyar; Hossein Saoudipour; Abolfazl Solbi; Hossein Soroudi
1954 Manila	Philippines (PHI); Bayani Amador; Florentino Bautista; Jose Maria Cacho; Napoleon Flores; Tony Genato; Rafael Hechanova; Eduardo Lim; Carlos Loyzaga; Ramon Manulat; Lauro Mumar; Francisco Rabat; Ignacio Ramos; Ponciano Saldaña; Mariano Tolentino	Republic of China (ROC); Hoo Cha-pen; Lai Lam-kwong; Edward Lee; Jose Lim; Julian Lim; Ling Jing-huan; Joachim Poon; Tong Suet-fong; Tsai Bon-hua; Wang Yih-jiun; Wu Yet-an; Joachim Yao; James Yap; Yung Pi-hock	Japan (JPN); Hirokazu Arai; Jyunya Arai; Riichi Arai; Takashi Itoyama; Takeshi Kinoshita; Hitoshi Konno; Hisashi Nagashima; Shozo Noguchi; Hiroshi Saito; Shigeuji Saito; Shutaro Shoji; Takeo Sugiyama
1958 Tokyo	Philippines (PHI); Emilio Achacoso; Kurt Bachmann; Carlos Badion; Loreto Carbonell; Francisco Lagarejos; Eduardo Lim; Carlos Loyzaga; Ramon Manulat; Leonardo Marquicias; Constancio Ortiz; Mariano Tolentino; Martin Urra; Antonio Villamor; Francis Wilson	Republic of China (ROC); Chen Tsu-li; Cheng Te-yuan; Fu Da-ren; Hoo Cha-pen; Huang Kwok-young; Lai Lam-kwong; Emilio Li; Ling Jing-huan; Loo Yee-shine; Lue Jih-ran; Shu Yao-huang; William Sy; Tong Suet-fong; Wang Yih-jiun	Japan (JPN); Kiyoshi Aoki; Manabu Fujita; Kenichi Imaizumi; Takashi Itoyama; Shoji Kamata; Hideo Kanekawa; Reijiro Kawamoto; Atsunosuke Kimura; Setsuo Nara; Hiroshi Saito; Shutaro Shoji; Sadao Sugawara; Takeo Sugiyama; Kaoru Wakabayashi
1962 Jakarta	Philippines (PHI); Engracio Arazas; Kurt Bachmann; Narciso Bernardo; Geronimo Cruz; Manuel Jocson; Carlos Loyzaga; Alfonso Marquez; Roehl Nadurata; Eduardo Pacheco; Cristobal Ramas; Alberto Reynoso; Edgardo Roque	Japan (JPN); Shoji Kamata; Takao Kaneda; Taku Kawai; Atsunosuke Kimura; Makoto Kuwabara; Takashi Masuda; Kunihiko Nakamura; Setsuo Nara; Yasukuni Oshima; Masashi Shiga; Kaoru Wakabayashi	South Korea (KOR); Bang Yeol; Kang Tae-ha; Kim Chul-kap; Kim In-kun; Kim Young-il; Kim Young-ki; Lee In-pyo; Lee Jong-hwan; Lee Kyung-oo; Moon Hyun-chang; Park Nam-chung
1966 Bangkok	Israel (ISR); Amnon Avidan; Tanhum Cohen-Mintz; Igal Dar; Gershon Dekel; Ofer Eshed; Abraham Gutt; David Kaminsky; Zvi Lubezki; Itshak Shachar; Ami Shelef; Haim Starkman; Ilan Zohar	Thailand (THA); Viroj Cheepluesak; Prakong Panturat; Dusit Puatusnanan; Surasak Saechua; Channaronk Seriwat; Tah Srirat; Pracha Srisavaet; Rangsan Supachitranan; Somsak Tohbundit; Wan Tubtawee; Manu Vichitsrawong; Banchong Vongwailert	South Korea (KOR); Choi Jong-kyu; Ha Ui-kon; Kim Chul-kap; Kim In-kun; Kim Mu-hyun; Kim Young-il; Lee Byung-goo; Lee Byung-kuk; Lee In-pyo; Park Han; Shin Dong-pa; Shin Hyun-soo
1970 Bangkok	South Korea (KOR); Choi Jong-kyu; Choo Hun-geun; Kim In-kun; Kim Young-il; Kwak Hyun-chae; Lee In-pyo; Lee Ja-young; Park Han; Shin Dong-pa; Shin Hyun-soo; Yoo Hi-hyung; Yoon Pyung-no	Israel (ISR); Dan Barzily; Tanhum Cohen-Mintz; Hillel Gilboa; Ronald Green; Hanan Keren; Ivan Leshinsky; Itamar Marzel; Gabi Neumark; Mike Schwartz; Haim Starkman; Gabi Teichner; Mark Turenshine	Japan (JPN); Shigeaki Abe; Yoshikuni Awano; Seiji Igarashi; Isao Kimura; Akira Kodama; Satoshi Mori; Fumihiko Moroyama; Kazufumi Sakai; Kenji Soda; Atsushi Somatomo; Masatomo Taniguchi; Kunihiko Yokoyama
1974 Tehran	Israel (ISR); Motti Aroesti; Mooley Avishar; Shmaryahu Zaslevsky; Shuki Schwartz; Hanan Keren; Miki Berkovich; Tal Brody; Avigdor Moskowitz; Shamuel Nachmias; Itamar Marzel; Jacob Eisner; Boaz Janay	South Korea (KOR); Lee Kwang-joon; Kim Dong-kwang; Kwak Hyun-chae; Kang Ho-seok; Yoo Hi-hyung; Cha Sung-hwan; Choi Kyung-duk; Lee Bo-sun; Hwang Jae-hwan; Lee Ja-young; Kim In-jin; Kim Kyung-tae	China (CHN); Zhang Weiping; Mo Liangui; Wang Deli; Zhang Dawei; Xuan Chengbin; Liu Changrong; Zhang Jianshe; Cai Weichu; Cai Guoqiang; Xu Zhengwen; Huang Pinjie; Zhao Liangcai
1978 Bangkok	China (CHN); Chen Kai; He Juhua; Huang Pinjie; Kuang Lubin; Liu Jizeng; Mu Tiezhu; Wang Deli; Wang Zongxing; Xing Weining; Zhang Mingshu; Zhang Weiping	South Korea (KOR); Cho Myung-soo; Choi Bu-young; Ha Dong-gi; Hwang Yu-ha; Kim Dong-kwang; Kim Hyung-nyun; Lee Chung-hee; Lee Moon-kyu; Lee Soo-gi; Park In-kyu; Park Soo-kyo; Shin Sun-woo	North Korea (PRK); An Gwang-gyun; Ja Myung-sam; Jo Nae-un; Kim Jin-geun; Kim Mu-myong; Kim Myung-jun; O Heung-ryong; O Tung-sik; Ri Eui-chol; Ri Geun-gwan; Ri Jung-bok; So Won-bae
1982 New Delhi	South Korea (KOR); An Jun-ho; Cho Myung-soo; Lee Chung-hee; Lee Jang-soo; Lee Min-hyun; Lee Young-keun; Lim Jung-myung; Park In-kyu; Park Jong-chun; Park Soo-kyo; Shin Dong-chan; Shin Sun-woo	China (CHN); Feng Wei; Han Pengshan; Huang Yunlong; Ji Zhaoguang; Kuang Lubin; Li Qiuping; Li Yaguang; Liu Jianli; Lü Jinqing; Sun Fengwu; Wang Libin; Xu Yuansheng	Japan (JPN); Toshiharu Baba; Yasuaki Ikeuchi; Nobuki Kato; Norihiko Kitahara; Katsushige Kumagai; Masaaki Mikami; Yasuyuki Nakajima; Yasutaka Okayama; Shuji Ono; Hiroyuki Otsuka; Takayuki Seto; Kanji Takaki
1986 Seoul	China (CHN); Gong Luming; Huang Yunlong; Li Feng; Li Yaguang; Sha Guoli; Song Tao; Sun Fengwu; Wang Fei; Wang Libin; Xu Xiaoliang; Zhang Bin; Zhang Yongjun	South Korea (KOR); Goh Myong-hwa; Han Ki-bum; Hur Jae; Kim Hyun-jun; Kim Sung-wook; Kim Yoo-taek; Lee Chung-hee; Lee Min-hyun; Lee Moon-kyu; Lee Won-woo; Lim Jung-myung; Park In-kyu	Philippines (PHI); Eric Altamirano; Allan Caidic; Glenn Capacio; Harmon Codiñera; Jerry Codiñera; Jojo Lastimosa; Samboy Lim; Ronnie Magsanoc; Alvin Patrimonio; Dindo Pumaren; Elmer Reyes; Jack Tanuan
1990 Beijing	China (CHN); Gong Luming; Gong Xiaobin; Li Chunjiang; Ma Jian; Shan Tao; Song Ligang; Sun Fengwu; Wang Fei; Wang Zhidan; Zhang Bin; Zhang Degui; Zhang Yongjun	Philippines (PHI); Allan Caidic; Hector Calma; Rey Cuenco; Yves Dignadice; Ramon Fernandez; Dante Gonzalgo; Samboy Lim; Chito Loyzaga; Ronnie Magsanoc; Alvin Patrimonio; Benjie Paras; Zaldy Realubit	South Korea (KOR); Choi Byung-shik; Hur Jae; Jung Jae-kun; Kang Dong-hee; Kim Hyun-jun; Kim Jin; Kim Yoo-taek; Lee Chung-hee; Lee Min-hyung; Lee Won-woo; Pyo Pil-sang; Seo Dae-seong
1994 Hiroshima	China (CHN); Adiljan Suleyman; Gong Xiaobin; Hu Weidong; Liu Daqing; Liu Yudong; Shan Tao; Sun Jun; Wang Zhidan; Wu Naiqun; Wu Qinglong; Zhang Jingsong; Zheng Wu	South Korea (KOR); Chun Hee-chul; Hur Jae; Hyun Joo-yup; Jung Jae-kun; Kang Dong-hee; Kim Seung-ki; Kim Yoo-taek; Kim Young-man; Lee Sang-min; Moon Kyung-eun; Oh Sung-sik; Seo Jang-hoon	Japan (JPN); Osamu Abe; Satoru Furuta; Masaki Goto; Makoto Hasegawa; Hiroharu Kaneko; Manabu Miyake; Yukinori Miyata; Takehiko Orimo; Kenichi Sako; Satoshi Sekiguchi; Akifumi Yamasaki; Takeshi Yuki
1998 Bangkok	China (CHN); Fan Bin; Gong Xiaobin; Hu Weidong; Li Nan; Li Xiaoyong; Liu Qiang; Liu Yudong; Mengke Bateer; Sun Jun; Wang Zhizhi; Zhang Jingsong; Zhang Wenqi	South Korea (KOR); Cho Sang-hyun; Choo Seung-gyun; Hyun Joo-yup; Jung Jae-kun; Kang Dong-hee; Kim Byong-chul; Kim Joo-sung; Kim Sung-chul; Lee Eun-ho; Lee Sang-min; Moon Kyung-eun; Seo Jang-hoon	Philippines (PHI); Johnny Abarrientos; Marlou Aquino; Allan Caidic; Kenneth Duremdes; Dennis Espino; E. J. Feihl; Jojo Lastimosa; Jun Limpot; Vergel Meneses; Alvin Patrimonio; Olsen Racela; Andy Seigle
2002 Busan	South Korea (KOR); Choo Seung-gyun; Shin Ki-sung; Kim Seung-hyun; Cho Sang-hyun; Lee Kyu-sup; Hyun Joo-yup; Moon Kyung-eun; Seo Jang-hoon; Bang Sung-yoon; Chun Hee-chul; Lee Sang-min; Kim Joo-sung	China (CHN); Guo Shiqiang; Liu Wei; Gong Xiaobin; Zhang Cheng; Hu Weidong; Chen Ke; Li Nan; Liu Yudong; Zhu Fangyu; Yao Ming; Mengke Bateer; Du Feng	Kazakhstan (KAZ); Roman Muravyov; Fedor Zakharchenko; Alexey Yeropkin; Vitaliy Lopatin; Alexandr Yemelyanov; Mikhail Dedov; Yevgeniy Issakov; Sergey Vdovin; Vitaliy Strebkov; Yevgeniy Ovsyannikov; Alexandr Derbush; Boris Tikhonenko
2006 Doha	China (CHN); Hu Xuefeng; Liu Wei; Zhang Jingsong; Wang Shipeng; Zhu Fangyu; Sun Yue; Li Nan; Yi Jianlian; Mo Ke; Tang Zhengdong; Wang Zhizhi; Li Ke	Qatar (QAT); Khalid Masoud; Malek Saleem; Saad Abdulrahman; Daoud Musa; Khalid Suliman; Ali Turki; Yasseen Ismail; Erfan Ali Saeed; Mohammed Saleem; Mohammed Salaheldin; Hashim Zaidan; Omer Abdelqader	Iran (IRI); Pouya Tajik; Amir Amini; Saman Veisi; Mehdi Kamrani; Samad Nikkhah Bahrami; Iman Zandi; Hamed Afagh; Alireza Honardoust; Aidin Nikkhah Bahrami; Karam Ahmadian; Mousa Nabipour; Hamed Haddadi
2010 Guangzhou	China (CHN); Ding Jinhui; Liu Wei; Zhang Qingpeng; Wang Shipeng; Zhu Fangyu; Sun Yue; Zhang Zhaoxu; Zhang Bo; Tang Zhengdong; Li Xiaoxu; Wang Zhizhi; Zhou Peng	South Korea (KOR); Park Chan-hee; Lee Jung-suk; Yang Dong-geun; Kim Joo-sung; Ha Seung-jin; Lee Kyu-sup; Cho Sung-min; Yang Hee-jong; Ham Ji-hoon; Kim Sung-chul; Lee Seung-jun; Oh Se-keun	Iran (IRI); Amir Amini; Aren Davoudi; Javad Davari; Mehdi Kamrani; Saeid Davarpanah; Oshin Sahakian; Hamed Afagh; Hamed Sohrabnejad; Ali Jamshidi; Asghar Kardoust; Samad Nikkhah Bahrami; Ali Doraghi
2014 Incheon	South Korea (KOR); Moon Tae-jong; Park Chan-hee; Yang Dong-geun; Kim Tae-sul; Lee Jong-hyun; Kim Sun-hyung; Cho Sung-min; Yang Hee-jong; Kim Joo-sung; Heo Il-young; Oh Se-keun; Kim Jong-kyu	Iran (IRI); Rouzbeh Arghavan; Sajjad Mashayekhi; Behnam Yakhchali; Mehdi Kamrani; Arman Zangeneh; Farid Aslani; Hamed Afagh; Oshin Sahakian; Asghar Kardoust; Mohammad Jamshidi; Samad Nikkhah Bahrami; Hamed Haddadi	Japan (JPN); Takumi Ishizaki; Ryumo Ono; Makoto Hiejima; Takatoshi Furukawa; Atsuya Ota; Naoto Tsuji; Kosuke Takeuchi; Daiki Tanaka; Tenketsu Harimoto; Yuki Togashi; Kosuke Kanamaru; Joji Takeuchi
2018 Jakarta–Palembang	China (CHN); Tian Yuxiang; Fang Shuo; Zhao Tailong; Yu Changdong; Ding Yanyuhang; Zhao Rui; Liu Zhixuan; Zhou Qi; Dong Hanlin; Sun Minghui; Abdusalam Abdurixit; Wang Zhelin	Iran (IRI); Meisam Mirzaei; Sajjad Mashayekhi; Aren Davoudi; Behnam Yakhchali; Vahid Dalirzahan; Rouzbeh Arghavan; Mohammad Jamshidi; Samad Nikkhah Bahrami; Hamed Haddadi; Navid Rezaeifar; Arsalan Kazemi; Mohammad Hassanzadeh	South Korea (KOR); Kim Jun-il; Park Chan-hee; Choi Jun-yong; Lee Jung-hyun; Kim Sun-hyung; Heo Hoon; Heo Ung; Heo Il-young; Kang Sang-jae; Jeon Jun-beom; Ra Gun-ah; Lee Seoung-hyun
2022 Hangzhou	Philippines (PHI); Chris Newsome; Kevin Alas; Scottie Thompson; Arvin Tolentino; Chris Ross; Marcio Lassiter; June Mar Fajardo; CJ Perez; Calvin Oftana; Japeth Aguilar; Justin Brownlee; Ange Kouame	Jordan (JOR); Fadi Qarmash; Freddy Ibrahim; Ashraf Al-Hendi; Ahmad Al-Hamarsheh; Sami Bzai; Ahmad Hammouri; Mohammad Hussein; Hashem Abbas; Malek Kanaan; Rondae Hollis-Jefferson; John Bohannon; Ahmad Al-Dwairi	China (CHN); Hu Mingxuan; Zhao Jiwei; Cheng Shuaipeng; Zhao Rui; Fu Hao; Yu Jiahao; Du Runwang; Cui Yongxi; Hu Jinqiu; Zhu Junlong; Wang Zhelin; Zhang Zhenlin
2026 Aichi–Nagoya	South Korea (KOR); Lee Hyun-jung; Choi Jun-yong; Byeon Jun-hyeong; Lee Jung-hyun; Yu Ki-sang; Lee Woo-suk; Moon Jeong-hyeon; Yeo Jun-seok; Moon Yu-hyeon; Jang Jae-seok; Lee Seoung-hyun; Daniel Edi	Japan (JPN); Kotetsu Kurokawa; John Harper Jr. Ren Kanechika; Toyoshige Kano; Ibu Yamazaki; Yuto Kawashima; Kazuma Tsuya; Atsuya Ogawa; Avi Schafer; Jaheru Yamauchi; Alex Kirk; Shinji Takashima	Iran (IRI); Piter Girgoorian; Alireza Sharifi; Mobin Sheikhi; Navid Rezaeifar; Khashayar Aliakbarinamghi; Mohammad Heydari; Arman Zangeneh; Mohammad Jamshidi; Arsalan Kazemi; Matin Aghajanpour; Salar Monji; Mahdi Jafari

=== Women ===
Games	Gold	Silver	Bronze
1974 Tehran	Japan (JPN); Reiko Aonuma; Machiko Aoyama; Hisako Furuno; Kimiko Hashimoto; Kazuko Kadoya; Teruko Miyamoto; Eriko Nagai; Keiko Namai; Miyako Otsuka; Kimi Wakitashiro; Sachiyo Yamamoto	South Korea (KOR); Cho Myung-ok; Cho Yung-soon; Kang Hyun-suk; Kim Eun-ju; Kim Jae-soon; Lee Ock-ja; Park Sung-ja; Shin In-sup; Won Young-ja; Yoo Kwae-soon; Yoon Jung-ko; Yoon Seon-ja	China (CHN); Chen Xiushan; Du Huanwen; Fang Fengdi; Li Muzhen; Liu Yumin; Luo Xuelian; Wang Naifeng; Wang She; Wang Yuzhen; Wei Wenshan; Yang Shuying; Zhu Qihui
1978 Bangkok	South Korea (KOR); Cho Eun-ja; Cho Young-ran; Choi Seung-hee; Chun Kyung-suk; Hong He-ran; Hong Young-soon; Jung Hee-sook; Jung Mi-ra; Kang Hyun-suk; Lee Hyang-ju; Park Chan-sook; Song Keum-soon	China (CHN); Fan Guilan; Fan Huifang; Jiao Li; Luo Xuelian; Peng Nian; Song Xiaobo; Sun Ruiyun; Yu Aifeng; Zhang Lijun; Zhang Mingxiang; Zhao Aili	Japan (JPN); Hiromi Amano; Keiko Araki; Mieko Fukui; Setsuko Hashizume; Rieko Itani; Tomoko Iwasaki; Hiroko Nakagawa; Chiemi Sato; Kazuko Sato; Tomoko Shibukawa; Kanoko Suzuki; Noriko Suzuki
1982 New Delhi	China (CHN); Chen Yuefang; Liu Min; Liu Qing; Qiu Chen; Song Xiaobo; Sun Ruiyun; Xian Liqing; Xiu Lijuan; You Shumin; Zhang Hui; Zhang Liuru; Zhang Yueqin	South Korea (KOR); Bang Shin-sil; Cha Yang-sook; Hong He-ran; Hong Young-soon; Kim Hwa-soon; Kim Young-hee; Kwon Myung-hee; Park Chan-sook; Park Jin-sook; Park Yang-gae; Sung Jung-a; Woo Eun-kyung	Japan (JPN); Nanae Fujii; Setsuko Hashizume; Shoko Ito; Hiromi Kinjo; Yuko Kizuka; Kumi Kubota; Shigeko Kumagai; Mari Nehyo; Kazumi Shimizu; Mari Suzuki; Mika Sugihara; Noriko Tanaka
1986 Seoul	China (CHN); Cong Xuedi; Han Qingling; Liu Lin; Liu Qing; Peng Ping; Qiu Chen; Wang Jun; Wang Yuping; Xu Chunmei; Xue Cuilan; Zhang Yueqin; Zheng Haixia	South Korea (KOR); Cho Mun-chu; Choi Kyung-hee; Kim Eun-sook; Kim Hwa-soon; Kim Young-hee; Lee Hyung-sook; Lee Kum-jin; Lee Mi-ja; Moon Kyung-ja; Seo Kyung-hwa; Sung Jung-a; Woo Eun-kyung	Japan (JPN); Satsuki Harada; Mika Horiuchi; Misao Ishii; Kumi Kubota; Mayumi Kuroda; Junko Matsuura; Yoko Nogura; Kayoko Sato; Kazumi Shimizu; Tamami Takara; Yasuko Takaya; Toyoko Takeyama
1990 Beijing	South Korea (KOR); Cho Mun-chu; Choi Kyung-hee; Chun Eun-sook; Chung Eun-soon; Ha Sook-rye; Jeong Mi-kyeong; Lee Hyung-sook; Lee Kang-hee; Lim Ae-kyeong; Seo Kyung-hwa; Sung Jung-a; Yoo Jeong-ae	China (CHN); Hu Yun; Li Xin; Ling Guang; Liu Qing; Peng Ping; Wang Fang; Xu Chunmei; Xu Shuling; Xue Cuilan; Zhao Li; Zheng Haixia; Zheng Wei	Chinese Taipei (TPE); Chang Li-ching; Chang Yi-te; Chen I-lan; Chen Shu-chen; Chi Ching-lu; Chi Lin; Chien Wei-chuan; Chin Su-li; Ho Yung-wen; Lee Pi-hsia; Teng Pi-chen; Wu Hsiu-kuei
1994 Hiroshima	South Korea (KOR); Cho Hey-jin; Chun Eun-sook; Chun Joo-weon; Chung Eun-soon; Ha Sook-rye; Han Hyun-sun; Jung Sun-min; Lee Hee-joo; Park Hyun-sook; Song Yung-won; Yoo Young-joo; Youn Young-mi	Japan (JPN); Mikiko Hagiwara; Noriko Hamaguchi; Yuka Harada; Aki Ichijo; Hiroe Kakizaki; Takako Kato; Kikuko Mikawa; Chikako Murakami; Akemi Okazato; Taeko Oyama; Takami Takeuchi; Kagari Yamada	China (CHN); Li Dongmei; Li Xin; Liang Xin; Liu Jun; Ma Zongqing; Peng Ping; Sun Ying; Wang Fang; Zhang Weijuan; Zheng Dongmei; Zheng Haixia; Zheng Wei
1998 Bangkok	Japan (JPN); Noriko Hamaguchi; Rie Hattori; Kaori Kawakami; Satomi Miki; Mutsuko Nagata; Akemi Okazato; Taeko Oyama; Chisako Shimada; Yuko Tsukahara; Kagari Yamada; Kumiko Yamada; Mayumi Yoshiyama	China (CHN); Chen Bin; Sui Feifei; Jiang Xu; Liu Yuexiu; Ma Chengqing; Ma Zongqing; Miao Bo; Miao Lijie; Pan Wei; Wang Fuying; Wang Ling; Zheng Dongmei	South Korea (KOR); Cho Hey-jin; Chun Joo-weon; Hong Jung-ae; Jang Sun-hyoung; Jung Sun-min; Kim Ji-yoon; Kim Kwe-ryong; Lee Eun-young; Lee Jong-ae; Park Jung-eun; Yang Hee-youn; Yoo Young-joo
2002 Busan	China (CHN); Song Xiaoyun; Zhang Hanlan; Pan Wei; Miao Bo; Miao Lijie; Ren Lei; Sui Feifei; Liu Xiaohong; Chen Luyun; Zhang Xiaoni; Chen Xiaoli; Chen Nan	South Korea (KOR); Kim Yeong-ok; Chun Joo-weon; Kim Ji-yoon; Lee Eun-ju; Jang Sun-hyoung; Lee Mi-sun; Beon Yeon-ha; Park Jung-eun; Hong Hyun-hee; Lee Jong-ae; Jung Sun-min; Kim Kwe-ryong	Chinese Taipei (TPE); Chu Yung-hsu; Chien Wei-chuan; Chiang Feng-chun; Mai Ya-hui; Chao Pi-feng; Huang Shiau-jie; Chang Hui-yin; Cheng Hui-yun; Tsai Pei-ying; Tang Su-tuan; Chen Yi-ju; Liu Chun-yi
2006 Doha	China (CHN); Song Xiaoyun; Bian Lan; Jia Guang; Zhang Wei; Miao Lijie; Ren Lei; Sui Feifei; Ji Xiao; Chen Xiaoli; Liu Dan; Zhang Xiaoni; Chen Nan	Chinese Taipei (TPE); Chen Yi-feng; Chien Wei-chuan; Chiang Feng-chun; Sun Chieh-ping; Lan Jui-yu; Chu Yung-hsu; Wen Chi; Cheng Hui-yun; Lin Hui-mei; Lin Chi-wen; Li Wan-ting; Liu Chun-yi	Japan (JPN); Emi Isoyama; Hiromi Suwa; Yuki Morimoto; Yuka Watanabe; Noriko Sakakibara; Akino Nakagawa; Ryoko Utsumi; Eriko Hata; Asami Yoshida; Yuko Oga; Kumiko Yamada
2010 Guangzhou	China (CHN); Zhang Hanlan; Bian Lan; Ding Yuan; Zhang Wei; Miao Lijie; Guan Xin; Zhang Fan; Ma Zengyu; Chen Xiaoli; Gao Song; Liu Dan; Chen Nan	South Korea (KOR); Kim Bo-mi; Kim Ji-yoon; Jung Sun-hwa; Lee Mi-sun; Lee Kyung-eun; Kang A-jeong; Beon Yeon-ha; Park Jung-eun; Ha Eun-joo; Kim Dan-bi; Kim Kwe-ryong; Sin Jung-ja	Japan (JPN); Yoko Nagi; Maki Takada; Yuka Mamiya; Ai Mitani; Ayumi Suzuki; Hiromi Suwa; Saori Fujiyoshi; Yoshie Sakurada; Asami Yoshida; Yuko Oga; Reika Takahashi; Sachiko Ishikawa
2014 Incheon	South Korea (KOR); Kim Dan-bi; Lee Mi-sun; Lee Kyung-eun; Park Hye-jin; Kwak Joo-yeong; Yang Ji-hee; Beon Yeon-ha; Lim Yung-hui; Ha Eun-joo; Kim Jung-eun; Kang Young-suk; Sin Jung-ja	China (CHN); Liu Dan; Jin Weina; Yu Dong; Shi Xiufeng; Sun Xiaoyu; Shen Binbin; Ma Xueya; Ding Yuan; Zhang Fan; Yang Banban; Yang Hengyu; Jin Jiabao	Japan (JPN); Evelyn Mawuli; Hiromi Suwa; Sanae Motokawa; Mucha Mori; Maya Kawahara; Yuri Ushida; Rui Machida; Naho Miyoshi; Rui Kato; Mikoto Onuma; Aya Watanabe; Sakura Akaho
2018 Jakarta–Palembang	China (CHN); Yang Liwei; Li Yuan; Wang Siyu; Wang Lili; Shao Ting; Li Meng; Wang Xuemeng; Huang Sijing; Liu Jiacen; Sun Mengran; Li Yueru; Han Xu	Korea (COR); Kang Lee-seul; Park Ji-hyun; Kim Hye-yon; Park Hye-jin; Choi Eun-sil; Jang Mi-gyong; Park Ha-na; Lim Yung-hui; Ro Suk-yong; Kim So-dam; Park Ji-su; Kim Han-byul	Japan (JPN); Layla Takehara; Stephanie Mawuli; Haruka Suzuki; Mio Shinozaki; Shiori Yasuma; Miyuki Kawamura; Moe Nagata; Saki Hayashi; Saori Miyazaki; Tamami Nakada; Aya Watanabe; Kadysha Umezawa
2022 Hangzhou	China (CHN); Li Yuan; Wang Siyu; Yang Shuyu; Yang Liwei; Jin Weina; Li Meng; Zhang Ru; Huang Sijing; Pan Zhenqi; Luo Xinyu; Li Yueru; Han Xu	Japan (JPN); Mai Kawai; Maki Takada; Minami Yabu; Azusa Asahina; Nako Motohashi; Saki Hayashi; Aika Hirashita; Saori Miyazaki; Anri Hoshi; Nanako Todo; Himawari Akaho; Monica Okoye	South Korea (KOR); Shin Ji-hyun; Kang Lee-seul; An He-ji; Lee So-hee; Park Ji-su; Lee Kyung-eun; Kang Yoo-lim; Park Ji-hyun; Lee Hae-ran; Kim Dan-bi; Yang In-young; Jin An
2026 Aichi–Nagoya	South Korea (KOR); Heo Ye-eun; Kang Lee-seul; An He-ji; Choi I-saem; Jeong Hyun; Lee So-hee; Kang Yoo-lim; Park So-hee; Lee Hae-ran; Hong Yu-sun; Jin An	Japan (JPN); Riho Akagi; Miyu Okamoto; Maika Miura; Nana Santa; Mona Tateyama; Ami Tsuneta; Takako Sato; Mio Shiraishi; Ufuoma Tanaka; Maho Awatani; Suzuno Higuchi; Haru Owaki	China (CHN); Zhang Manman; Wang Siyu; Yang Shuyu; Deng Yuting; Tang Ziting; Luo Xinyu; Chen Yujie; Chen Mingling; Zhang Ziyu; Sun Yu; Liu Yutong; Jia Saiqi

== 3x3 basketball ==
=== Men ===
Games	Gold	Silver	Bronze
2018 Jakarta–Palembang	China (CHN); Chen Gong; Xiao Hailiang; Huang Wenwei; Zeng Bingqiang	South Korea (KOR); An Young-jun; Kim Nak-hyeon; Park In-tae; Yang Hong-seok	Iran (IRI); Ali Allahverdi; Amir Hossein Azari; Navid Khajehzadeh; Mohammad Yousefvand
2022 Hangzhou	Chinese Taipei (TPE); Yu Xiang-ping; Chiang Chun; Wang Jhe-yu; Lin Sin-kuan	Qatar (QAT); Hamad Yassin Mousa; Omar Mohamed Saad; Mohammed Abbasher; Ahmad Saeid Mohamad	Mongolia (MGL); Lkhagvaagiin Avirmed; Batzorigiin Sükhbat; Myagmarsürengiin Ölzii-Orshikh; Tsermaagiin Batzayaa
2026 Aichi–Nagoya	South Korea (KOR); Kim Seung-woo; Ku Min-gyo; Lee Dong-geun; Lee Ju-yeong	Qatar (QAT); Mohammed Abbasher; Mubarak Jama; Nazar Mahmoud; Hamad Mousa	Iran (IRI); Seyedmohammad Ghafari; Sarem Jafari; Mohammadbasir Momeni; Mohammadmahdi Rahimi

=== Women ===
Games	Gold	Silver	Bronze
2018 Jakarta–Palembang	China (CHN); Li Yingyun; Dilana Dilixiati; Jiang Jiayin; Zhang Zhiting	Japan (JPN); Ririka Okuyama; Norika Konno; Stephanie Mawuli; Kiho Miyashita	Thailand (THA); Amphawa Thuamon; Thunchanok Lumdabpang; Warunee Kitraksa; Rujiwan Bunsinprom
2022 Hangzhou	China (CHN); Wang Jiahui; Chen Mingling; Wan Jiyuan; Wang Xinyu	Mongolia (MGL); Bat-Erdeniin Ariuntsetseg; Tsendjavyn Bolortsetseg; Ölziibatyn Indra; Erdenebayangiin Narangoo	Japan (JPN); Nanami Seki; Momoka Hanashima; Karin Imori; Mayu Kubota
2026 Aichi–Nagoya	Japan (JPN); Yuki Hirashita; Sakura Horiuchi; Fatoumanana Nishi; Haruka Yamamoto	Philippines (PHI); Kacey Dela Rosa; Amyah Espanol; Kennan Ka; Maria Pasilang	South Korea (KOR); Choi Ye-seul; Heo Yoo-jung; Kim Jeong-eun; Song Yun-ha
