= Basketball at the 1958 Asian Games =

- Venue: Metropolitan Gymnasium
- Date: 25 May – 1 June 1958
- Nations: 10

Basketball was one of the 14 sports disciplines held in the 1958 Asian Games in Tokyo, Japan. The Philippines successfully defended their title and won their third straight Asian Games championship. The games were held from May 25 to June 1, 1958.

== Medalists ==
Event	Gold	Silver	Bronze
Men	Philippines; Emilio Achacoso; Kurt Bachmann; Carlos Badion; Loreto Carbonell; Francisco Lagarejos; Eduardo Lim; Carlos Loyzaga; Ramon Manulat; Leonardo Marquicias; Constancio Ortiz; Mariano Tolentino; Martin Urra; Antonio Villamor; Francis Wilson	Republic of China; Chen Tsu-li; Cheng Te-yuan; Fu Da-ren; Hoo Cha-pen; Huang Kwok-young; Lai Lam-kwong; Emilio Li; Ling Jing-huan; Loo Yee-shine; Lue Jih-ran; Shu Yao-huang; William Sy; Tong Suet-fong; Wang Yih-jiun	Japan; Kiyoshi Aoki; Manabu Fujita; Kenichi Imaizumi; Takashi Itoyama; Shoji Kamata; Hideo Kanekawa; Reijiro Kawamoto; Atsunosuke Kimura; Setsuo Nara; Hiroshi Saito; Shutaro Shoji; Sadao Sugawara; Takeo Sugiyama; Kaoru Wakabayashi

== Results ==
=== Preliminary round ===
==== Group A ====
Pos	Team	Pld	W	L	PF	PA	PD	Pts	Qualification
1	Philippines	2	2	0	207	100	+107	4	Final round
2	Thailand	2	1	1	143	168	−25	3	Final round
3	Malaya	2	0	2	131	213	−82	2	Classification 7th–10th

Source: Results

25 May

Philippines	97–40	Thailand

Metropolitan Gymnasium, Tokyo

26 May

Malaya	71–103	Thailand

Metropolitan Gymnasium, Tokyo

27 May

Philippines	110–60	Malaya

Metropolitan Gymnasium, Tokyo

==== Group B ====
Pos	Team	Pld	W	L	PF	PA	PD	Pts	Qualification
1	Japan	2	2	0	174	147	+27	4	Final round
2	Singapore	2	1	1	178	166	+12	3	Final round
3	Hong Kong	2	0	2	147	186	−39	2	Classification 7th–10th

Source: Results

25 May

Japan	85–70	Hong Kong

Metropolitan Gymnasium, Tokyo

26 May

Singapore	101–77	Hong Kong

Metropolitan Gymnasium, Tokyo

27 May

Japan	89–77	Singapore

Metropolitan Gymnasium, Tokyo

==== Group C ====
Pos	Team	Pld	W	L	PF	PA	PD	Pts	Qualification
1	Republic of China	3	3	0	270	208	+62	6	Final round
2	South Korea	3	2	1	304	229	+75	5	Final round
3	Indonesia	3	1	2	224	295	−71	4	Classification 7th–10th
4	Cambodia	3	0	3	252	318	−66	3	Classification 7th–10th

Source: Results

25 May

South Korea	127–92	Cambodia

Metropolitan Gymnasium, Tokyo

25 May

Republic of China	102–64	Indonesia

Metropolitan Gymnasium, Tokyo

26 May

Republic of China	95–75	Cambodia

Metropolitan Gymnasium, Tokyo

26 May

South Korea	108–64	Indonesia

Metropolitan Gymnasium, Tokyo

27 May

Indonesia	96–85	Cambodia

Metropolitan Gymnasium, Tokyo

27 May

Republic of China	73–69	South Korea

Metropolitan Gymnasium, Tokyo

=== Classification 7th–10th ===
Pos	Team	Pld	W	L	PF	PA	PD	Pts
1	Cambodia	3	2	1	281	257	+24	5 (Note: Overall game points difference was used as the tiebreaker.)
2	Hong Kong	3	2	1	261	248	+13	5
3	Indonesia	3	2	1	269	260	+9	5
4	Malaya	3	0	3	248	294	−46	3

Source: Results
Notes:

28 May

Hong Kong	78–92	Cambodia

Metropolitan Gymnasium, Tokyo

28 May

Malaya	84–98	Indonesia

Metropolitan Gymnasium, Tokyo

29 May

Malaya	86–102	Cambodia

Metropolitan Gymnasium, Tokyo

29 May

Hong Kong	89–78	Indonesia

Metropolitan Gymnasium, Tokyo

30 May

Indonesia	93–87	Cambodia

Metropolitan Gymnasium, Tokyo

30 May

Malaya	78–94	Hong Kong

Metropolitan Gymnasium, Tokyo

=== Final round ===
Pos	Team	Pld	W	L	PF	PA	PD	Pts
1	Philippines	5	4	1	452	391	+61	9 (Note: Overall game points difference was used as the tiebreaker.)
2	Republic of China	5	4	1	443	394	+49	9
3	Japan	5	4	1	424	389	+35	9
4	South Korea	5	2	3	414	427	−13	7
5	Singapore	5	1	4	358	441	−83	6
6	Thailand	5	0	5	392	441	−49	5

Source: Results
Notes:

28 May

Republic of China	92–81	Singapore

Metropolitan Gymnasium, Tokyo

28 May

Philippines	99–85	South Korea

Metropolitan Gymnasium, Tokyo

28 May

Japan	97–77	Thailand

Metropolitan Gymnasium, Tokyo

29 May

Republic of China	76–67	Thailand

Metropolitan Gymnasium, Tokyo

29 May

Japan	74–66	South Korea

Metropolitan Gymnasium, Tokyo

29 May

Philippines	93–55	Singapore

Metropolitan Gymnasium, Tokyo

30 May

Thailand	91–101	South Korea

Metropolitan Gymnasium, Tokyo

30 May

Japan	83–71	Singapore

Metropolitan Gymnasium, Tokyo

30 May

Philippines	88–93	Republic of China

Metropolitan Gymnasium, Tokyo

31 May

Philippines	82–75	Thailand

Metropolitan Gymnasium, Tokyo

31 May

Japan	87–85	Republic of China

Metropolitan Gymnasium, Tokyo

31 May

Singapore	66–91	South Korea

Metropolitan Gymnasium, Tokyo

1 June

Thailand	82–85	Singapore

Metropolitan Gymnasium, Tokyo

1 June

Philippines	90–83	Japan

Metropolitan Gymnasium, Tokyo

1 June

Republic of China	97–71	South Korea

Metropolitan Gymnasium, Tokyo

== Final standing ==
Rank	Team	Pld	W	L
1st place, gold medalist(s)	Philippines	7	6	1
2nd place, silver medalist(s)	Republic of China	8	7	1
3rd place, bronze medalist(s)	Japan	7	6	1
4	South Korea	8	4	4
5	Singapore	7	2	5
6	Thailand	7	1	6
7	Cambodia	6	2	4
8	Hong Kong	5	2	3
9	Indonesia	6	3	3
10	Malaya	5	0	5
