= Basketball at the 1954 Asian Games =

- Venue: Rizal Memorial Coliseum
- Date: 2–8 May 1954
- Nations: 8

Basketball was one of the many sports which was held at the 1954 Asian Games in Manila, Philippines. It acted as the Asian qualifying tournament for the 1954 FIBA World Championship in Brazil.

== Medalists ==
Event	Gold	Silver	Bronze
Men	Philippines; Bayani Amador; Florentino Bautista; Jose Maria Cacho; Napoleon Flores; Tony Genato; Rafael Hechanova; Eduardo Lim; Carlos Loyzaga; Ramon Manulat; Lauro Mumar; Francisco Rabat; Ignacio Ramos; Ponciano Saldaña; Mariano Tolentino	Republic of China; Hoo Cha-pen; Lai Lam-kwong; Edward Lee; Jose Lim; Julian Lim; Ling Jing-huan; Joachim Poon; Tong Suet-fong; Tsai Bon-hua; Wang Yih-jiun; Wu Yet-an; Joachim Yao; James Yap; Yung Pi-hock	Japan; Hirokazu Arai; Jyunya Arai; Riichi Arai; Takashi Itoyama; Takeshi Kinoshita; Hitoshi Konno; Hisashi Nagashima; Shozo Noguchi; Hiroshi Saito; Shigeuji Saito; Shutaro Shoji; Takeo Sugiyama

== Results ==
=== Preliminary round ===
==== Group A ====
Pos	Team	Pld	W	L	PF	PA	PD	Pts	Qualification
1	Philippines	3	3	0	271	149	+122	6	Final round
2	South Korea	3	2	1	203	197	+6	5	Final round
3	Singapore	3	1	2	249	206	+43	4	
4	Cambodia	3	0	3	144	315	−171	3	

Source: Results

2 May

Philippines	82–63	Singapore
Scoring by half: 47–31, 35–32

Rizal Memorial Coliseum, Manila

2 May

South Korea	89–48	Cambodia
Scoring by half: 34–22, 55–26

Rizal Memorial Coliseum, Manila

3 May

Philippines	105–41	Cambodia
Scoring by half: 47–14, 58–27

Rizal Memorial Coliseum, Manila

3 May

South Korea	69–65	Singapore
Scoring by half: 32–35, 37–30

Rizal Memorial Coliseum, Manila

4 May

Singapore	121–55	Cambodia
Scoring by half: 58–27, 63–28

Rizal Memorial Coliseum, Manila

4 May

Philippines	84–45	South Korea
Scoring by half: 48–20, 36–25

Rizal Memorial Coliseum, Manila

==== Group B ====
Pos	Team	Pld	W	L	PF	PA	PD	Pts	Qualification
1	Republic of China	3	3	0	231	145	+86	6	Final round
2	Japan	3	2	1	173	161	+12	5	Final round
3	Indonesia	3	1	2	175	224	−49	4	
4	Thailand	3	0	3	166	215	−49	3	

Source: Results

2 May

Japan	61–46	Indonesia
Scoring by half: 24–17, 37–29

Rizal Memorial Coliseum, Manila

2 May

Republic of China	73–46	Thailand

Rizal Memorial Coliseum, Manila

3 May

Republic of China	96–54	Indonesia
Scoring by half: 44–18, 52–36

Rizal Memorial Coliseum, Manila

3 May

Japan	67–53	Thailand
Scoring by half: 27–21, 40–32

Rizal Memorial Coliseum, Manila

4 May

Republic of China	62–45	Japan
Scoring by half: 34–19, 28–26

Rizal Memorial Coliseum, Manila

4 May

Indonesia	75–67	Thailand
Scoring by half: 36–34, 39–33

Rizal Memorial Coliseum, Manila

=== Final round ===
Pos	Team	Pld	W	L	PF	PA	PD	Pts
1	Philippines	3	3	0	178	119	+59	6
2	Republic of China	3	2	1	140	140	0	5
3	Japan	3	1	2	151	172	−21	4
4	South Korea	3	0	3	152	190	−38	3

Source: Results

6 May

Republic of China	56–53	South Korea
Scoring by half: 30–23, 26–30

Rizal Memorial Coliseum, Manila

6 May

Philippines	68–40	Japan
Scoring by half: 27–16, 41–24

Rizal Memorial Coliseum, Manila

7 May

Republic of China	57–53 (OT)	Japan
Scoring by half: 25–34, 26–17 Overtime: 6–2

Rizal Memorial Coliseum, Manila

7 May

Philippines	76–52	South Korea
Scoring by half: 39–23, 37–29

Rizal Memorial Coliseum, Manila

8 May

South Korea	47–58	Japan

Rizal Memorial Coliseum, Manila

8 May

Philippines	34–27	Republic of China
Scoring by half: 26–22, 8–5

Rizal Memorial Coliseum, Manila

== Final standing ==
Rank	Team	Pld	W	L
1st place, gold medalist(s)	Philippines	6	6	0
2nd place, silver medalist(s)	Republic of China	6	5	1
3rd place, bronze medalist(s)	Japan	6	3	3
4	South Korea	6	2	4
5	Indonesia	3	1	2
5	Singapore	3	1	2
7	Cambodia	3	0	3
7	Thailand	3	0	3
