= Basketball at the 1970 Asian Games =

- Venue: Kittikachorn Stadium
- Date: 10–19 December 1970
- Nations: 12

Basketball was one of the 13 sports disciplines held in the 1970 Asian Games again in Bangkok, Thailand. South Korea got their first Asian basketball title by outlasting the defending champions Israel in the championship round. The games were held from December 10 to 19, 1970.

== Medalists ==
Event	Gold	Silver	Bronze
Men	South Korea; Choi Jong-kyu; Choo Hun-geun; Kim In-kun; Kim Young-il; Kwak Hyun-chae; Lee In-pyo; Lee Ja-young; Park Han; Shin Dong-pa; Shin Hyun-soo; Yoo Hi-hyung; Yoon Pyung-no	Israel; Dan Barzily; Tanhum Cohen-Mintz; Hillel Gilboa; Ronald Green; Hanan Keren; Ivan Leshinsky; Itamar Marzel; Gabi Neumark; Mike Schwarz; Haim Starkman; Gabi Teichner; Mark Turenshine	Japan; Shigeaki Abe; Yoshikuni Awano; Seiji Igarashi; Isao Kimura; Akira Kodama; Satoshi Mori; Fumihiko Moroyama; Kazufumi Sakai; Kenji Soda; Atsushi Somatomo; Masatomo Taniguchi; Kunihiko Yokoyama

== Draw ==
The teams were seeded based on their final ranking at the 1966 Asian Games

Group A

- Israel (1)
- Japan (4)
- South Vietnam
- Singapore

Group B

- Thailand (2)
- Republic of China (5)
- India
- Malaysia

Group C

- South Korea (3)
- Philippines (6)
- Iran
- Hong Kong

== Results ==
=== Preliminary round ===
==== Group A ====
Pos	Team	Pld	W	L	PF	PA	PD	Pts	Qualification
1	Israel	3	3	0	288	181	+107	6	Final round
2	Japan	3	2	1	243	185	+58	5	Final round
3	Singapore	3	1	2	203	284	−81	4	Classification 7th–12th
4	South Vietnam	3	0	3	202	286	−84	3	Classification 7th–12th

Source: Results

10 December

Israel	108–59	South Vietnam

Kittikachorn Stadium, Bangkok

10 December

Japan	99–47	Singapore

Kittikachorn Stadium, Bangkok

11 December

South Vietnam	56–80	Japan

Kittikachorn Stadium, Bangkok

11 December

Israel	98–58	Singapore

Kittikachorn Stadium, Bangkok

12 December

Israel	82–64	Japan

Kittikachorn Stadium, Bangkok

12 December

South Vietnam	87–98	Singapore

Kittikachorn Stadium, Bangkok

==== Group B ====
Pos	Team	Pld	W	L	PF	PA	PD	Pts	Qualification
1	India	3	2	1	218	210	+8	5 (Note: Tied on head-to-head wins (1). Head-to-head game points average: IND 1.022, ROC 1.000, THA 0.976.)	Final round
2	Republic of China	3	2	1	210	190	+20	5	Final round
3	Thailand	3	2	1	201	189	+12	5	Classification 7th–12th
4	Malaysia	3	0	3	199	239	−40	3	Classification 7th–12th

Source: Results
Notes:

10 December

Republic of China	74–71	India

Kittikachorn Stadium, Bangkok

10 December

Thailand	80–65	Malaysia

Kittikachorn Stadium, Bangkok

11 December

Malaysia	62–82	Republic of China

Kittikachorn Stadium, Bangkok

11 December

Thailand	64–70	India

Kittikachorn Stadium, Bangkok

12 December

Malaysia	72–77	India

Kittikachorn Stadium, Bangkok

12 December

Thailand	57–54	Republic of China

Kittikachorn Stadium, Bangkok

==== Group C ====
Pos	Team	Pld	W	L	PF	PA	PD	Pts	Qualification
1	South Korea	3	3	0	303	203	+100	6	Final round
2	Philippines	3	2	1	280	221	+59	5	Final round
3	Iran	3	1	2	264	271	−7	4	Classification 7th–12th
4	Hong Kong	3	0	3	174	326	−152	3	Classification 7th–12th

Source: Results

10 December

Philippines	113–54	Hong Kong

Kittikachorn Stadium, Bangkok

10 December

South Korea	110–77	Iran

Kittikachorn Stadium, Bangkok

11 December

Iran	90–92	Philippines

Kittikachorn Stadium, Bangkok

11 December

South Korea	116–51	Hong Kong

Kittikachorn Stadium, Bangkok

12 December

Iran	97–69	Hong Kong

Kittikachorn Stadium, Bangkok

12 December

South Korea	77–75	Philippines

Kittikachorn Stadium, Bangkok

=== Classification 7th–12th ===
Pos	Team	Pld	W	L	PF	PA	PD	Pts
1	Iran	5	5	0	476	397	+79	10
2	Thailand	5	4	1	466	430	+36	9
3	Malaysia	5	3	2	419	380	+39	8
4	Singapore	5	2	3	422	432	−10	7
5	South Vietnam	5	1	4	450	531	−81	6
6	Hong Kong	5	0	5	374	437	−63	5

Source: Results

14 December

Singapore	86–72	Hong Kong

Kittikachorn Stadium, Bangkok

14 December

Iran	104–97	South Vietnam

Kittikachorn Stadium, Bangkok

14 December

Thailand	83–79	Malaysia

Kittikachorn Stadium, Bangkok

15 December

Hong Kong	78–79	South Vietnam

Kittikachorn Stadium, Bangkok

15 December

Thailand	69–107	Iran

Kittikachorn Stadium, Bangkok

15 December

Malaysia	76–69	Singapore

Kittikachorn Stadium, Bangkok

16 December

Hong Kong	72–95	Thailand

Kittikachorn Stadium, Bangkok

16 December

Malaysia	79–82	Iran

Kittikachorn Stadium, Bangkok

16 December

South Vietnam	101–122	Singapore

Kittikachorn Stadium, Bangkok

18 December

Iran	88–64	Singapore

Kittikachorn Stadium, Bangkok

18 December

Thailand	124–91	South Vietnam

Kittikachorn Stadium, Bangkok

18 December

Hong Kong	64–82	Malaysia

Kittikachorn Stadium, Bangkok

19 December

Hong Kong	88–95	Iran

Kittikachorn Stadium, Bangkok

19 December

Singapore	81–95	Thailand

Kittikachorn Stadium, Bangkok

19 December

Malaysia	103–82	South Vietnam

Kittikachorn Stadium, Bangkok

=== Final round ===
Pos	Team	Pld	W	L	PF	PA	PD	Pts
1	South Korea	5	4	1	393	320	+73	9 (Note: Head-to-head result: KOR 81–67 ISR.)
2	Israel	5	4	1	429	373	+56	9
3	Japan	5	3	2	—	—	—	8
4	Republic of China	5	2	3	364	386	−22	7 (Note: Head-to-head result: ROC 75–64 PHI.)
5	Philippines	5	2	3	381	378	+3	7
6	India	5	0	5	—	—	—	5

Source: Results
Notes:

14 December

Israel	83–67	Japan

Kittikachorn Stadium, Bangkok

14 December

Philippines	97–79	India

Kittikachorn Stadium, Bangkok

14 December

South Korea	74–72	Republic of China

Kittikachorn Stadium, Bangkok

15 December

Republic of China	63–114	Israel

Kittikachorn Stadium, Bangkok

15 December

Japan	vs.	India

Kittikachorn Stadium, Bangkok

15 December

Philippines	70–65	South Korea

Kittikachorn Stadium, Bangkok

16 December

Philippines	64–75	Republic of China

Kittikachorn Stadium, Bangkok

16 December

South Korea	80–57	Japan

Kittikachorn Stadium, Bangkok

16 December

Israel	82–74	India

Kittikachorn Stadium, Bangkok

18 December

Japan	81–66	Republic of China

Kittikachorn Stadium, Bangkok

18 December

Philippines	78–83	Israel

Kittikachorn Stadium, Bangkok

18 December

South Korea	93–54	India

Kittikachorn Stadium, Bangkok

19 December

Philippines	72–76	Japan

Kittikachorn Stadium, Bangkok

19 December

India	53–78	Republic of China

Kittikachorn Stadium, Bangkok

19 December

Israel	67–81	South Korea

Kittikachorn Stadium, Bangkok

== Final standing ==
Rank	Team	Pld	W	L
1st place, gold medalist(s)	South Korea	8	7	1
2nd place, silver medalist(s)	Israel	8	7	1
3rd place, bronze medalist(s)	Japan	8	5	3
4	Republic of China	8	4	4
5	Philippines	8	4	4
6	India	8	2	6
7	Iran	8	6	2
8	Thailand	8	6	2
9	Malaysia	8	3	5
10	Singapore	8	3	5
11	South Vietnam	8	1	7
12	Hong Kong	8	0	8
