= Basketball at the 1962 Asian Games =

- Venue: Senayan Basketball Hall; Istora Senayan
- Date: 25 August – 3 September 1962
- Nations: 9

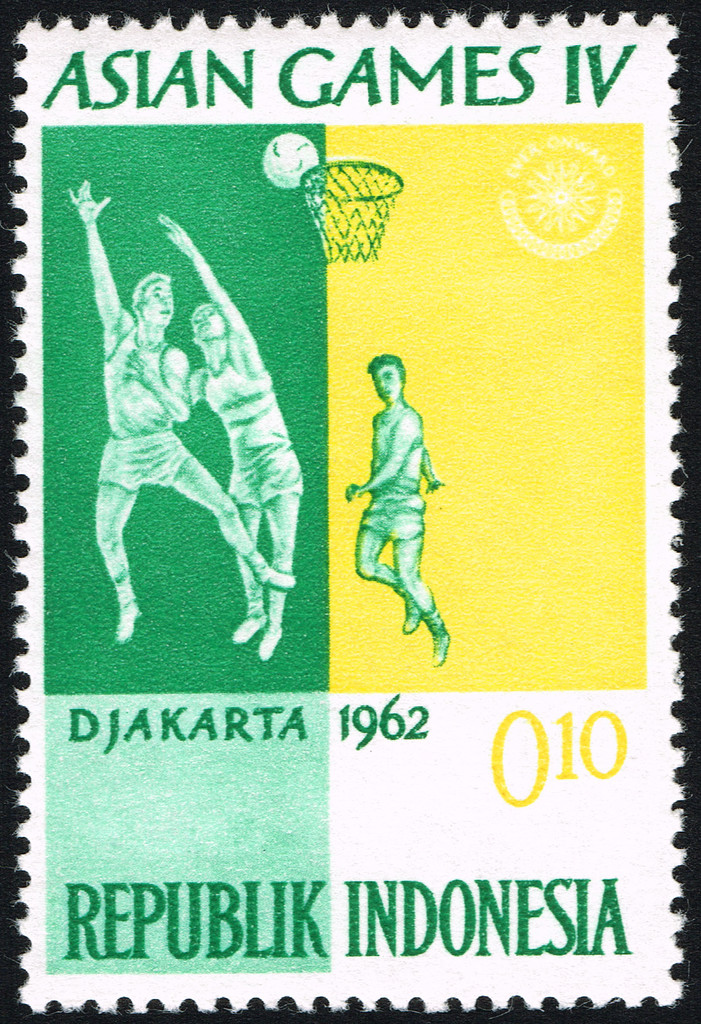
Basketball at the 1962 Asian Games on a stamp of Indonesia

Basketball was one of the 13 sports in the 1962 Asian Games in Jakarta, Indonesia. The Philippines successfully defended their title and got their fourth straight Asian Games championship which would be their last until the 2022 Edition. The games were held from 25 August to 3 September 1962.

== Medalists ==
Event	Gold	Silver	Bronze
Men	Philippines; Engracio Arazas; Kurt Bachmann; Narciso Bernardo; Geronimo Cruz; Manuel Jocson; Carlos Loyzaga; Alfonso Marquez; Roehl Nadurata; Eduardo Pacheco; Cristobal Ramas; Alberto Reynoso; Edgardo Roque	Japan; Shoji Kamata; Takao Kaneda; Taku Kawai; Atsunosuke Kimura; Makoto Kuwabara; Takashi Masuda; Kunihiko Nakamura; Setsuo Nara; Yasukuni Oshima; Masashi Shiga; Kaoru Wakabayashi	South Korea; Bang Yeol; Kang Tae-ha; Kim Chul-kap; Kim In-kun; Kim Young-il; Kim Young-ki; Lee In-pyo; Lee Jong-hwan; Lee Kyung-oo; Moon Hyun-chang; Park Nam-chung

== Draw ==
Group A

- ~~Republic of China~~
- Indonesia
- Hong Kong

Group B

- Philippines
- Thailand
- Cambodia

Group C

- Japan
- South Korea
- Singapore
- Malaya

* Indonesian government refused to issue visas for the Taiwanese delegation.

== Results ==
=== Preliminary round ===
==== Group A ====
Pos	Team	Pld	W	L	PF	PA	PD	Pts	Qualification
1	Indonesia	1	1	0	81	78	+3	2	Final round
2	Hong Kong	1	0	1	78	81	−3	1	Final round

Source: Results

25 August

Indonesia	81–78	Hong Kong

Senayan Basketball Hall, Jakarta

==== Group B ====
Pos	Team	Pld	W	L	PF	PA	PD	Pts	Qualification
1	Philippines	2	2	0	153	113	+40	4	Final round
2	Thailand	2	1	1	125	128	−3	3	Final round
3	Cambodia	2	0	2	108	145	−37	2	Classification 7th–9th

Source: Results

25 August

Thailand	64–56	Cambodia

Senayan Basketball Hall, Jakarta

26 August

Philippines	81–52	Cambodia

Senayan Basketball Hall, Jakarta

27 August

Philippines	72–61	Thailand

Senayan Basketball Hall, Jakarta

==== Group C ====
Pos	Team	Pld	W	L	PF	PA	PD	Pts	Qualification
1	Japan	3	3	0	236	171	+65	6	Final round
2	South Korea	3	2	1	236	212	+24	5	Final round
3	Singapore	3	1	2	216	245	−29	4	Classification 7th–9th
4	Malaya	3	0	3	184	244	−60	3	Classification 7th–9th

Source: Results

25 August

South Korea	84–65	Malaya

Senayan Basketball Hall, Jakarta

25 August

Japan	97–48	Singapore

Senayan Basketball Hall, Jakarta

26 August

South Korea	87–73	Singapore

Senayan Basketball Hall, Jakarta

26 August

Japan	65–58	Malaya

Senayan Basketball Hall, Jakarta

27 August

Singapore	95–61	Malaya

Senayan Basketball Hall, Jakarta

27 August

Japan	74–65	South Korea

Senayan Basketball Hall, Jakarta

=== Classification 7th–9th ===
Pos	Team	Pld	W	L	PF	PA	PD	Pts
1	Cambodia	2	2	0	149	131	+18	4
2	Singapore	2	1	1	156	142	+14	3
3	Malaya	2	0	2	126	158	−32	2

Source: Results

29 August

Cambodia	76–71	Singapore

Istora Senayan, Jakarta

30 August

Cambodia	73–60	Malaya

Istora Senayan, Jakarta

31 August

Singapore	85–66	Malaya

Istora Senayan, Jakarta

=== Final round ===
Pos	Team	Pld	W	L	PF	PA	PD	Pts
1	Philippines	5	5	0	500	350	+150	10
2	Japan	5	4	1	406	364	+42	9
3	South Korea	5	3	2	410	364	+46	8
4	Thailand	5	2	3	381	438	−57	7
5	Indonesia	5	1	4	422	494	−72	6
6	Hong Kong	5	0	5	387	496	−109	5

Source: Results

29 August

Philippines	84–68	South Korea

Istora Senayan, Jakarta

29 August

Japan	88–62	Hong Kong

Istora Senayan, Jakarta

29 August

Indonesia	76–86	Thailand

Istora Senayan, Jakarta

30 August

Japan	81–66	Thailand

Istora Senayan, Jakarta

30 August

Hong Kong	72–90	South Korea

Istora Senayan, Jakarta

30 August

Indonesia	74–107	Philippines

Istora Senayan, Jakarta

31 August

Philippines	108–73	Thailand

Istora Senayan, Jakarta

31 August

Japan	75–58	South Korea

Istora Senayan, Jakarta

31 August

Indonesia	120–106	Hong Kong

Istora Senayan, Jakarta

2 September

Philippines	100–68	Hong Kong

Istora Senayan, Jakarta

2 September

Thailand	58–94	South Korea

Istora Senayan, Jakarta

2 September

Indonesia	77–95	Japan

Istora Senayan, Jakarta

3 September

Hong Kong	79–98	Thailand

Istora Senayan, Jakarta

3 September

Indonesia	75–100	South Korea

Istora Senayan, Jakarta

3 September

Philippines	101–67	Japan

Istora Senayan, Jakarta

== Final standing ==
Rank	Team	Pld	W	L
1st place, gold medalist(s)	Philippines	7	7	0
2nd place, silver medalist(s)	Japan	8	7	1
3rd place, bronze medalist(s)	South Korea	8	5	3
4	Thailand	7	3	4
5	Indonesia	6	2	4
6	Hong Kong	6	0	6
7	Cambodia	4	2	2
8	Singapore	5	2	3
9	Malaya	5	0	5
