= Basketball at the Asian Games =

- Governing bodies: FIBA (World) / FIBA Asia (Asia)
- Events: 4 (men: 2; women: 2)

Games
- 1951; 1954; 1958; 1962; 1966; 1970; 1974; 1978; 1982; 1986; 1990; 1994; 1998; 2002; 2006; 2010; 2014; 2018; 2022; 2026
- Medalists

Basketball is the regular Asian Games sport since the first edition in Delhi 1951. The Asian Games tournaments were the de facto Asian championships until the Asian Basketball Confederation Championship was founded in 1960.

== Player eligibility ==
The Asian Games does not follow FIBA eligibility rules. At least as early the 2010 edition, players do not have to obtain a passport at a certain age but rather have three years of residency in the country associated with their national team. The regulations reportedly was enforced in the 2014 edition, rendering named players in various national teams ineligible to compete.

For 3x3 basketball, the competition is restricted to players 23-years of age and below.

== Basketball ==
=== Summaries ===
==== Men ====
#	Year	Host	Final			Third place game			Teams
#	Year	Host	Winner	Score	Runner-up	3rd place	Score	4th place	Teams
1	1951	(India); New Delhi	Philippines	No playoffs	Japan	Iran	No playoffs	India	5
2	1954	(Philippines); Manila	Philippines	No playoffs	Republic of China	Japan	No playoffs	South Korea	8
3	1958	(Japan); Tokyo	Philippines	No playoffs	Republic of China	Japan	No playoffs	South Korea	10
4	1962	(Indonesia); Jakarta	Philippines	No playoffs	Japan	South Korea	No playoffs	Thailand	9
5	1966	(Thailand); Bangkok	Israel	90–42	Thailand	South Korea	72–60	Japan	11
6	1970	(Thailand); Bangkok	South Korea	No playoffs	Israel	Japan	No playoffs	Republic of China	12
7	1974	(Iran); Tehran	Israel	92–85	South Korea	China	102–89	Philippines	11
8	1978	(Thailand); Bangkok	China	No playoffs	South Korea	North Korea	No playoffs	Japan	14
9	1982	(India); New Delhi	South Korea	No playoffs	China	Japan	No playoffs	Philippines	13
10	1986	(South Korea); Seoul	China	No playoffs	South Korea	Philippines	No playoffs	Jordan	8
11	1990	(China); Beijing	China	90–76	Philippines	South Korea	99–74	Japan	11
12	1994	(Japan); Hiroshima	China	100–71	South Korea	Japan	79–76	Philippines	9
13	1998	(Thailand); Bangkok	China	112–92	South Korea	Philippines	73–68	Kazakhstan	12
14	2002	(South Korea); Busan	South Korea	102–100; OT	China	Kazakhstan	68–66	Philippines	12
15	2006	(Qatar); Doha	China	59–44	Qatar	Iran	84–78	Jordan	20
16	2010	(China); Guangzhou	China	77–71	South Korea	Iran	74–66	Japan	16
17	2014	(South Korea); Incheon	South Korea	79–77	Iran	Japan	76–72	Kazakhstan	16
18	2018	(Indonesia); Jakarta–Palembang	China	84–72	Iran	South Korea	89–81	Chinese Taipei	13
19	2022	(China); Hangzhou	Philippines	70–60	Jordan	China	101–73	Chinese Taipei	16
20	2026	(Japan); Aichi–Nagoya	South Korea	67–57	Japan	Iran	79–70	China	12

Medal table

Rank	Nation	Gold	Silver	Bronze	Total
1	China	8	2	2	12
2	South Korea	5	6	4	15
3	Philippines	5	1	2	8
4	Israel	2	1	0	3
5	Japan	0	3	6	9
6	Iran	0	2	4	6
7	Chinese Taipei	0	2	0	2
8	Jordan	0	1	0	1
8	Qatar	0	1	0	1
8	Thailand	0	1	0	1
11	Kazakhstan	0	0	1	1
11	North Korea	0	0	1	1
Totals (12 entries)		20	20	20	60

==== Women ====
#	Year	Host	Final			Third place game			Teams
#	Year	Host	Winner	Score	Runner-up	3rd place	Score	4th place	Teams
1	1974	(Iran); Tehran	Japan	No playoffs	South Korea	China	No playoffs	Iran	5
2	1978	(Thailand); Bangkok	South Korea	No playoffs	China	Japan	No playoffs	Thailand	5
3	1982	(India); New Delhi	China	No playoffs	South Korea	Japan	No playoffs	North Korea	5
4	1986	(South Korea); Seoul	China	No playoffs	South Korea	Japan	No playoffs	Malaysia	4
5	1990	(China); Beijing	South Korea	77–70	China	Chinese Taipei	90–71	Japan	6
6	1994	(Japan); Hiroshima	South Korea	77–76	Japan	China	83–31	Chinese Taipei	6
7	1998	(Thailand); Bangkok	Japan	93–69	China	South Korea	92–76	Chinese Taipei	7
8	2002	(South Korea); Busan	China	80–76	South Korea	Chinese Taipei	86–79	Japan	6
9	2006	(Qatar); Doha	China	90–59	Chinese Taipei	Japan	74–70	South Korea	6
10	2010	(China); Guangzhou	China	70–64	South Korea	Japan	73–61	Chinese Taipei	7
11	2014	(South Korea); Incheon	South Korea	70–64	China	Japan	61–59	Chinese Taipei	11
12	2018	(Indonesia); Jakarta–Palembang	China	71–65	Korea	Japan	76–63	Chinese Taipei	10
13	2022	(China); Hangzhou	China	74–72	Japan	South Korea	93–63	North Korea	12
14	2026	(Japan); Aichi–Nagoya	South Korea	75–70	Japan	China	77–64	Chinese Taipei	11

Medal table

Rank	Nation	Gold	Silver	Bronze	Total
1	China	7	4	3	14
2	South Korea	5	5	2	12
3	Japan	2	3	7	12
4	Chinese Taipei	0	1	2	3
5	Korea	0	1	0	1
Totals (5 entries)		14	14	14	42

=== Participating nations ===
==== Men ====
Team	(India) 1951	(Philippines) 1954	(Japan) 1958	(Indonesia) 1962	(Thailand) 1966	(Thailand) 1970	(Iran) 1974	(Thailand) 1978	(India) 1982	(South Korea) 1986	(China) 1990	(Japan) 1994	(Thailand) 1998	(South Korea) 2002	(Qatar) 2006	(China) 2010	(South Korea) 2014	(Indonesia) 2018	(China) 2022	(Japan) 2026	Years
Afghanistan															13th	14th					2
Bahrain							11th	13th	10th						12th				10th	6th	6
Cambodia		7th	7th	7th																	3
China							3rd	1st	2nd	1st	1st	1st	1st	2nd	1st	1st	5th	1st	3rd	4th	14
Chinese Taipei		2nd	2nd		5th	4th					5th	6th	5th	7th	8th	9th	9th	4th	4th	5th	14
Hong Kong			8th	6th		12th		11th		8th	11th		11th	8th	17th	15th	13th	13th	12th		13
India	4th					6th			8th						17th	12th	9th				6
Indonesia		5th	9th	5th														8th	15th	12th	6
Iran	3rd				7th	7th	6th				7th	8th	7th		3rd	3rd	2nd	2nd	5th	3rd	13
Iraq							9th	9th	9th												3
Israel					1st	2nd	1st														3
Japan	2nd	3rd	3rd	2nd	4th	3rd	7th	4th	3rd	6th	4th	3rd	10th	6th	6th	4th	3rd	7th	8th	2nd	20
Jordan										4th					4th	7th	9th		2nd	7th	6
Kazakhstan												5th	4th	3rd	7th		4th	11th	11th	11th	8
Kuwait							10th	10th	6th	7th				10th	17th	16th	9th				8
Kyrgyzstan													12th								1
Lebanon															9th						1
Macau															13th						1
Malaysia			10th	9th	8th	9th		7th	7th	5th											7
Maldives																	15th				1
Mongolia														12th	13th	10th	8th	10th	14th		6
Myanmar	5th				11th																2
North Korea							5th	3rd	5th		8th			5th		8th					6
North Yemen									13th												1
Pakistan							8th	8th			10th										3
Palestine															17th		15th				2
Philippines	1st	1st	1st	1st	6th	5th	4th	5th	4th	3rd	2nd	4th	3rd	4th		6th	7th	5th	1st	9th	19
Qatar								14th						9th	2nd	5th	6th	9th	9th	10th	8
Saudi Arabia								12th			9th	7th					13th		6th	8th	6
Singapore		5th	5th	8th		10th															4
South Korea		4th	4th	3rd	3rd	1st	2nd	2nd	1st	2nd	3rd	2nd	2nd	1st	5th	2nd	1st	3rd	7th	1st	19
South Yemen									12th												1
Sri Lanka					10th																1
Syria															10th			6th			2
Thailand		7th	6th	4th	2nd	8th		6th					6th					12th	16th		9
Turkmenistan																13th					1
United Arab Emirates									11th		6th	9th	8th	11th	13th				13th		7
Uzbekistan													9th		11th	11th					3
Vietnam					9th	11th															2
Teams (39)	5	8	10	9	11	12	11	14	13	8	11	9	12	12	20	16	16	13	16	12	_

==== Women ====
Team	(Iran) 1974	(Thailand) 1978	(India) 1982	(South Korea) 1986	(China) 1990	(Japan) 1994	(Thailand) 1998	(South Korea) 2002	(Qatar) 2006	(China) 2010	(South Korea) 2014	(Indonesia) 2018	(China) 2022	(Japan) 2026	Years
China	3rd	2nd	1st	1st	2nd	3rd	2nd	1st	1st	1st	2nd	1st	1st	3rd	14
Chinese Taipei					3rd	4th	4th	3rd	2nd	4th	4th	4th	7th	4th	10
Hong Kong											9th	10th	9th	10th	4
India			5th							7th	6th	9th	6th		5
Indonesia												7th	8th	6th	3
Iran	4th														1
Japan	1st	3rd	3rd	3rd	4th	2nd	1st	4th	3rd	3rd	3rd	3rd	2nd	2nd	14
Kazakhstan						5th	5th				5th	5th	12th	9th	6
Korea												2nd			1
Lebanon									6th						1
Malaysia		5th		4th				6th						11th	4
Maldives										6th					1
Mongolia											8th	8th	10th	7th	4
Nepal											10th				1
North Korea	DQ		4th		5th								4th		4
Philippines							6th						5th	5th	3
Qatar											DQ				1
South Korea	2nd	1st	2nd	2nd	1st	1st	3rd	2nd	4th	2nd	1st		3rd	1st	13
Thailand		4th			6th	6th	7th		5th	5th	7th	6th	11th	8th	10
Uzbekistan								5th							1
Teams (20)	5	5	5	4	6	6	7	6	6	7	11	10	12	11	_

== 3x3 basketball ==
=== Summaries ===
==== Men ====
#	Year	Host	Final			Third place game			Teams
#	Year	Host	Winner	Score	Runner-up	3rd place	Score	4th place	Teams
1	2018	(Indonesia); Jakarta–Palembang	China	19–18; OT	South Korea	Iran	21–7	Thailand	22
2	2022	(China); Hangzhou	Chinese Taipei	18–16	Qatar	Mongolia	21–20	South Korea	19
3	2026	(Japan); Aichi–Nagoya	South Korea	19–10	Qatar	Iran	21–10	Philippines	16

Medal table

Rank	Nation	Gold	Silver	Bronze	Total
1	South Korea	1	1	0	2
2	China	1	0	0	1
2	Chinese Taipei	1	0	0	1
4	Qatar	0	2	0	2
5	Iran	0	0	2	2
6	Mongolia	0	0	1	1
Totals (6 entries)		3	3	3	9

==== Women ====
#	Year	Host	Final			Third place game			Teams
#	Year	Host	Winner	Score	Runner-up	3rd place	Score	4th place	Teams
1	2018	(Indonesia); Jakarta–Palembang	China	21–10	Japan	Thailand	15–14; OT	Chinese Taipei	16
2	2022	(China); Hangzhou	China	21–12	Mongolia	Japan	21–13	Chinese Taipei	15
3	2026	(Japan); Aichi–Nagoya	Japan	21–11	Philippines	South Korea	21–8	Thailand	16

Medal table

Rank	Nation	Gold	Silver	Bronze	Total
1	China	2	0	0	2
2	Japan	1	1	1	3
3	Mongolia	0	1	0	1
3	Philippines	0	1	0	1
5	South Korea	0	0	1	1
5	Thailand	0	0	1	1
Totals (6 entries)		3	3	3	9

=== Participating nations ===
==== Men ====
Team	(Indonesia) 2018	(China) 2022	Years
Afghanistan	19th		1
Bangladesh	20th		1
Cambodia		15th	1
China	1st	5th	2
Chinese Taipei	7th	1st	2
Hong Kong		13th	1
India		10th	1
Indonesia	11th		1
Iran	3rd	7th	2
Iraq	9th		1
Japan	5th	6th	2
Jordan	18th	18th	2
Kazakhstan	8th	9th	2
Kyrgyzstan	17th	17th	2
Macau		12th	1
Malaysia	13th	16th	2
Maldives	DQ	19th	2
Mongolia	12th	3rd	2
Nepal	14th		1
Philippines		8th	1
Qatar	6th	2nd	2
South Korea	2nd	4th	2
Sri Lanka	16th		1
Syria	10th		1
Thailand	4th	11th	2
Turkmenistan	15th	14th	2
Vietnam	21st		1
Teams (27)	22	19	_

==== Women ====
Team	(Indonesia) 2018	(China) 2022	Years
China	1st	1st	2
Chinese Taipei	4th	4th	2
Hong Kong		12th	1
India		8th	1
Indonesia	6th		1
Iran	8th		1
Japan	2nd	3rd	2
Jordan		9th	1
Kazakhstan	11th	7th	2
Malaysia	7th	10th	2
Maldives	DQ	13th	2
Mongolia	12th	2nd	2
Nepal	14th	14th	2
Philippines		DQ	1
Qatar	15th		1
South Korea	5th	5th	2
Sri Lanka	10th		1
Syria	13th		1
Thailand	3rd	6th	2
Uzbekistan		11th	1
Vietnam	9th		1
Teams (21)	16	15	_

== Total medal table ==
Rank	Nation	Gold	Silver	Bronze	Total
1	China (CHN)	18	6	5	29
2	South Korea (KOR)	11	12	7	30
3	Philippines (PHI)	5	2	2	9
4	Japan (JPN)	3	7	14	24
5	Israel (ISR)	2	1	0	3
6	Chinese Taipei (TPE)	1	3	2	6
7	Qatar (QAT)	0	3	0	3
8	Iran (IRI)	0	2	6	8
9	Mongolia (MGL)	0	1	1	2
9	Thailand (THA)	0	1	1	2
11	Jordan (JOR)	0	1	0	1
11	Korea (COR)	0	1	0	1
13	Kazakhstan (KAZ)	0	0	1	1
13	North Korea (PRK)	0	0	1	1
Totals (14 entries)		40	40	40	120
