= Basketball at the 1986 Asian Games =

- Venue: Jamsil Gymnasium
- Date: 22 September – 3 October 1986
- Nations: 8

Basketball was one of the 26 sports disciplines held in the 1986 Asian Games in Seoul, South Korea. China swept all their assignments in the round robin format en route to their 2nd title both in the men's and women's tournament. The games were held from September 20 to October 3, 1986.

== Medalists ==
Event	Gold	Silver	Bronze
Men	China; Gong Luming; Huang Yunlong; Li Feng; Li Yaguang; Sha Guoli; Song Tao; Sun Fengwu; Wang Fei; Wang Libin; Xu Xiaoliang; Zhang Bin; Zhang Yongjun	South Korea; Goh Myong-hwa; Han Ki-bum; Hur Jae; Kim Hyun-jun; Kim Sung-wook; Kim Yoo-taek; Lee Chung-hee; Lee Min-hyun; Lee Moon-kyu; Lee Won-woo; Lim Jung-myung; Park In-kyu	Philippines; Eric Altamirano; Allan Caidic; Glenn Capacio; Harmon Codiñera; Jerry Codiñera; Jojo Lastimosa; Samboy Lim; Ronnie Magsanoc; Alvin Patrimonio; Dindo Pumaren; Elmer Reyes; Jack Tanuan
Women	China; Cong Xuedi; Han Qingling; Liu Lin; Liu Qing; Peng Ping; Qiu Chen; Wang Jun; Wang Yuping; Xu Chunmei; Xue Cuilan; Zhang Yueqin; Zheng Haixia	South Korea; Cho Mun-chu; Choi Kyung-hee; Kim Eun-sook; Kim Hwa-soon; Kim Young-hee; Lee Hyung-sook; Lee Kum-jin; Lee Mi-ja; Moon Kyung-ja; Seo Kyung-hwa; Sung Jung-a; Woo Eun-kyung	Japan; Satsuki Harada; Mika Horiuchi; Misao Ishii; Kumi Kubota; Mayumi Kuroda; Junko Matsuura; Yoko Nogura; Kayoko Sato; Kazumi Shimizu; Tamami Takara; Yasuko Takaya; Toyoko Takeyama

== Medal table ==
Rank	Nation	Gold	Silver	Bronze	Total
1	China (CHN)	2	0	0	2
2	South Korea (KOR)	0	2	0	2
3	Japan (JPN)	0	0	1	1
3	Philippines (PHI)	0	0	1	1
Totals (4 entries)		2	2	2	6

== Final standing ==
=== Men ===
Rank	Team	Pld	W	L
1st place, gold medalist(s)	China	7	7	0
2nd place, silver medalist(s)	South Korea	7	6	1
3rd place, bronze medalist(s)	Philippines	7	5	2
4	Jordan	7	3	4
5	Malaysia	7	3	4
6	Japan	7	2	5
7	Kuwait	7	2	5
8	Hong Kong	7	0	7

=== Women ===
Rank	Team	Pld	W	L
1st place, gold medalist(s)	China	3	3	0
2nd place, silver medalist(s)	South Korea	3	2	1
3rd place, bronze medalist(s)	Japan	3	1	2
4	Malaysia	3	0	3
