= Basketball at the 1966 Asian Games =

- Venue: Nimibutr Stadium
- Date: 10–19 December 1966
- Nations: 11

Basketball was one of the 14 sports disciplines held in the 1966 Asian Games in Bangkok, Thailand. Israel won their 1st title by beating host country in the championship match. This marked the first time the Philippines wasn't able to reach the semifinals. The games were held from 10 December to 19, 1966.

== Medalists ==
Event	Gold	Silver	Bronze
Men	Israel; Amnon Avidan; Tanhum Cohen-Mintz; Igal Dar; Gershon Dekel; Ofer Eshed; Abraham Gutt; David Kaminsky; Zvi Lubezki; Itshak Shachar; Ami Shelef; Haim Starkman; Ilan Zohar	Thailand; Viroj Cheepluesak; Prakong Panturat; Dusit Puatusnanan; Surasak Saechua; Channaronk Seriwat; Tah Srirat; Pracha Srisavaet; Rangsan Supachitranan; Somsak Tohbundit; Wan Tubtawee; Manu Vichitsrawong; Banchong Vongwailert	South Korea; Choi Jong-kyu; Ha Ui-kon; Kim Chul-kap; Kim In-kun; Kim Mu-hyun; Kim Young-il; Lee Byung-goo; Lee Byung-kuk; Lee In-pyo; Park Han; Shin Dong-pa; Shin Hyun-soo

== Results ==
=== Preliminary round ===
==== Group A ====
Pos	Team	Pld	W	L	PF	PA	PD	Pts	Qualification
1	Japan	4	4	0	326	199	+127	8	Semifinals
2	Thailand	4	3	1	327	274	+53	7	Semifinals
3	Republic of China	4	2	2	355	301	+54	6	Classification 5th–8th
4	Malaysia	4	1	3	259	293	−34	5	Classification 5th–8th
5	Ceylon	4	0	4	251	451	−200	4	Classification 9th–11th

Source: Results

10 December

Thailand	70–58	Malaysia

Nimibutr Stadium, Bangkok

10 December

Japan	115–53	Ceylon

Nimibutr Stadium, Bangkok

11 December

Republic of China	129–75	Ceylon

Nimibutr Stadium, Bangkok

11 December

Japan	69–34	Malaysia

Nimibutr Stadium, Bangkok

12 December

Thailand	120–70	Ceylon

Nimibutr Stadium, Bangkok

12 December

Japan	68–53	Republic of China

Nimibutr Stadium, Bangkok

14 December

Malaysia	87–53	Ceylon

Nimibutr Stadium, Bangkok

14 December

Thailand	78–72	Republic of China

Nimibutr Stadium, Bangkok

15 December

Republic of China	101–80	Malaysia

Nimibutr Stadium, Bangkok

15 December

Japan	74–59	Thailand

Nimibutr Stadium, Bangkok

==== Group B ====
Pos	Team	Pld	W	L	PF	PA	PD	Pts	Qualification
1	South Korea	5	5	0	457	298	+159	10	Semifinals
2	Israel	5	4	1	417	324	+93	9	Semifinals
3	Philippines	5	3	2	512	357	+155	8	Classification 5th–8th
4	Iran	5	2	3	380	398	−18	7	Classification 5th–8th
5	South Vietnam	5	1	4	378	501	−123	6	Classification 9th–11th
6	Burma	5	0	5	283	549	−266	5	Classification 9th–11th

Source: Results

10 December

South Korea	110–62	South Vietnam

Nimibutr Stadium, Bangkok

10 December

Philippines	132–49	Burma

Nimibutr Stadium, Bangkok

10 December

Israel	87–55	Iran

Nimibutr Stadium, Bangkok

11 December

South Korea	128–53	Burma

Nimibutr Stadium, Bangkok

11 December

Israel	100–70	South Vietnam

Nimibutr Stadium, Bangkok

11 December

Philippines	103–69	Iran

Nimibutr Stadium, Bangkok

12 December

Philippines	109–65	South Vietnam

Nimibutr Stadium, Bangkok

12 December

Iran	103–48	Burma

Nimibutr Stadium, Bangkok

12 December

South Korea	62–48	Israel

Nimibutr Stadium, Bangkok

14 December

South Vietnam	95–82	Burma

Nimibutr Stadium, Bangkok

14 December

South Korea	74–53	Iran

Nimibutr Stadium, Bangkok

14 December

Philippines	86–91	Israel

Nimibutr Stadium, Bangkok

15 December

Iran	100–86	South Vietnam

Nimibutr Stadium, Bangkok

15 December

Israel	91–51	Burma

Nimibutr Stadium, Bangkok

15 December

Philippines	82–83	South Korea

Nimibutr Stadium, Bangkok

=== Classification 9th–11th ===
Classification 9th–11th
17 December
Ceylon	107
Burma	82

9th place game
19 December
Ceylon	88
South Vietnam	102

==== Semifinals ====
17 December

Ceylon	107–82	Burma

Nimibutr Stadium, Bangkok

==== 9th place game ====
19 December

Ceylon	88–102	South Vietnam

Nimibutr Stadium, Bangkok

=== Classification 5th–8th ===
Classification 5th–8th
17 December
Republic of China	89
Iran	78
17 December
Philippines	113
Malaysia	73

5th place game
19 December
Republic of China	75
Philippines	72
7th place game
19 December
Iran	95
Malaysia	88

==== Semifinals ====
17 December

Republic of China	89–78	Iran

Nimibutr Stadium, Bangkok

17 December

Philippines	113–73	Malaysia

Nimibutr Stadium, Bangkok

==== 7th place game ====
19 December

Iran	95–88	Malaysia

Nimibutr Stadium, Bangkok

==== 5th place game ====
19 December

Republic of China	75–72	Philippines

Nimibutr Stadium, Bangkok

=== Final round ===
Semifinals
17 December
Japan	34
Israel	57
17 December
South Korea	52
Thailand	67

Gold medal game
19 December
Israel	90
Thailand	42
Bronze medal game
19 December
Japan	60
South Korea	72

==== Semifinals ====
17 December

Japan	34–57	Israel

Nimibutr Stadium, Bangkok

17 December

South Korea	52–67	Thailand

Nimibutr Stadium, Bangkok

==== Bronze medal game ====
19 December

Japan	60–72	South Korea

Nimibutr Stadium, Bangkok

==== Gold medal game ====
19 December

Israel	90–42	Thailand

Nimibutr Stadium, Bangkok

== Final standing ==
Rank	Team	Pld	W	L
1st place, gold medalist(s)	Israel	7	6	1
2nd place, silver medalist(s)	Thailand	6	4	2
3rd place, bronze medalist(s)	South Korea	7	6	1
4	Japan	6	4	2
5	Republic of China	6	4	2
6	Philippines	7	4	3
7	Iran	7	3	4
8	Malaysia	6	1	5
9	South Vietnam	6	2	4
10	Ceylon	6	1	5
11	Burma	6	0	6
