= Cambodia men's national basketball team =

Cambodia
- FIBA ranking: NR (13 July 2026)
- Joined FIBA: 1958
- FIBA zone: FIBA Asia
- National federation: Cambodian Basketball Federation
- Coach: Harry Savaya

FIBA World Cup
- Appearances: 0

FIBA Asia Cup
- Appearances: None
Home	Away

First international
- South Korea 89-48 Cambodia (Manila, Philippines; 2 May 1954)

Biggest win
- Cambodia 139–74 Laos (Rangoon, Burma; 12 December 1961)

Biggest defeat
- Philippines 137–34 Cambodia (Bandar Seri Begawan, Brunei; 13 August 1999)
Medal record
Southeast Asian Games
Silver medal – second place	1961 Rangoon	Team
Silver medal – second place	1965 Kuala Lumpur	Team
Bronze medal – third place	1971 Kuala Lumpur	Team

Former logo of the Cambodian Basketball Federation CBF

The Cambodia national basketball team represents Cambodia in international basketball competitions and is managed by the Cambodian Basketball Federation (CBF). At the 2023 SEA Games, Cambodia had its best performance ever, which has been the subject of controversy due to their inclusion of multiple naturalized players on their roster.

== History ==
Cambodia’s modern basketball revival builds on earlier international experience, including notable matches in the 1960s. The Cambodia men’s national basketball team faced strong international opposition, most notably the Brazil men’s national basketball team during the GANEFO Games 1963, where Cambodia impressed observers by putting up strong resistance despite defeat which ended 70:81.

Cambodian club and city teams also played friendly matches against visiting foreign clubs and Soviet teams during this period, helping to develop domestic basketball through international exposure during the 1960s.

In August 1966, the France national basketball team toured Cambodia for two matches in Phnom Penh. In the first match on 13 August 1966, Cambodia lost to France by a score of 47–60. The next day, Cambodia lost to France again with a score of 50–73.

Cambodia participated in its first FIBA-sanctioned event in the 21st century when it entered the SEABA qualifiers for the 2022 FIBA Asia Cup in 2018.

== Results ==
=== Summer Olympics ===
yet to qualify

=== FIBA Basketball World Cup ===
yet to qualify

=== FIBA Asia Cup ===
FIBA Asia Cup
Year	Position	Pld	W	L
(Philippines) 1960	Did not enter			
(Taiwan) 1963	Did not enter			
(Malaysia) 1965	Did not enter			
(South Korea) 1967	Did not enter			
(Thailand) 1969	Did not enter			
(Japan) 1971	Did not enter			
(Philippines) 1973	Did not enter			
(Thailand) 1975	Did not enter			
(Malaysia) 1977	Did not enter			
(Japan) 1979	Did not enter			
(India) 1981	Did not enter			
(Hong Kong) 1983	Did not enter			
(Malaysia) 1985	Did not enter			
(Thailand) 1987	Did not enter			
(China) 1989	Did not enter			
(Japan) 1991	Did not enter			
(Indonesia) 1993	Did not enter			
(South Korea) 1995	Did not enter			
(Saudi Arabia) 1997	Did not enter			
(Japan) 1999	Did not qualify			
(China) 2001	Did not enter			
(China) 2003	Did not enter			
(Qatar) 2005	Did not enter			
(Japan) 2007	Did not enter			
(China) 2009	Did not enter			
(China) 2011	Did not enter			
(Philippines) 2013	Did not enter			
(China) 2015	Did not enter			
(Lebanon) 2017	Did not enter			
(Indonesia) 2022	Did not qualify			
(Saudi Arabia) 2025	Did not enter			
2029	Did not enter			
Total	0/32	0	0	0

=== Asian Games ===
Champions Runners up Third place Fourth place

Asian Games
Year	Position	Pld	W	L
(India) 1951	Did not participate			
(Philippines) 1954	7th place	3	0	3
(Japan) 1958	7th place	6	2	4
(Indonesia) 1962	7th place	4	2	2
(Thailand) 1966	Did not participate			
(Thailand) 1970	Did not participate			
(Iran) 1974	Did not participate			
(Thailand) 1978	Did not participate			
(India) 1982	Did not participate			
(South Korea) 1986	Did not participate			
(China) 1990	Did not participate			
(Japan) 1994	Did not participate			
(Thailand) 1998	Did not participate			
(South Korea) 2002	Did not participate			
(Qatar) 2006	Did not participate			
(China) 2010	Did not participate			
(South Korea) 2014	Did not participate			
(Indonesia) 2018	Did not participate			
(China) 2022	Did not participate			
(Japan) 2026	Did not participate			
Total	3/20	13	4	9

=== SEABA Championship ===
Champions Runners up Third place Fourth place

SEABA Championship
Year	Position	Pld	W	L
(Malaysia) 1994	8th place	–	–	–
(Indonesia) 1996	5th place	–	–	–
(Philippines) 1998	7th place	4	1	3
(Philippines) 2001	Did not participate			
(Malaysia) 2003	Did not participate			
(Malaysia) 2005	Did not participate			
(Thailand) 2007	Did not participate			
(Indonesia) 2009	Did not participate			
(Indonesia) 2011	Did not participate			
(Indonesia) 2013	Did not participate			
(Singapore) 2015	Did not participate			
(Philippines) 2017	Did not participate			
Total	3/12	-		

=== Southeast Asian Games ===
Champions Runners up Third place Fourth place

Southeast Asian Games Record
Year	Position	Pld	W	L
(Malaysia) 1977	Did not participate			
(Indonesia) 1979	?			
(Philippines) 1981	Did not participate			
(Singapore) 1983	Did not participate			
(Thailand) 1985	Did not participate			
(Indonesia) 1987	?			
(Malaysia) 1989	Did not participate			
(Philippines) 1991	Did not participate			
(Singapore) 1993	?			
(Thailand) 1995	Did not participate			
(Indonesia) 1997	Did not participate			
(Brunei) 1999	?			
(Malaysia) 2001	Did not participate			
(Vietnam) 2003	Did not participate			
(Philippines) 2005	Not held			
(Thailand) 2007	5th place	4	0	4
(Laos) 2009	Not held			
(Indonesia) 2011	7th place	4	1	3
(Myanmar) 2013	6th place	6	1	5
(Singapore) 2015	6th place	5	2	3
(Malaysia) 2017	7th place	5	1	4
(Philippines) 2019	7th place	4	1	3
(Vietnam) 2021	6th place	6	0	6
(Cambodia) 2023	2nd place	5	4	1
(Thailand) 2025	Did not participate			
Total	8/22	39	10	29

== Team ==
Team for the 2023 Southeast Asian Games:

Cambodia National Basketball Team roster
Players
Coaches

Pos.	No.	Name	Age – Date of birth	Height	Club
F	1	Dwayne Morgan (NP)	27 – 29 January 1996	2.03 m (6 ft 8 in)	Caribbean Storm Islands	(Colombia)
G	4	Sayeed Pridgett (NP)	24 – 22 May 1998	1.96 m (6 ft 5 in)	Karditsa	(Greece)
F	6	Darius Henderson (NP)	–	2.06 m (6 ft 9 in)	Corban University	(United States)
G	7	Anthony Dominic Dar (NP)	28 – 25 February 1995	1.67 m (5 ft 6 in)	Hartford Shockers	(United States)
G	10	Darrin Dorsey (NP)	35 – 17 May 1987	1.88 m (6 ft 2 in)	Trefl Sopot	(Poland)
F	11	Pek Mith	37 – 11 May 1985	1.85 m (6 ft 1 in)		(Cambodia)
	13	Sophana Chin	–			(Cambodia)
	14	Somoeur Chanyvathana	–			(Cambodia)
G	15	Joseph Hoeup	25 – 11 September 1997	1.88 m (6 ft 2 in)		(Cambodia)
F	16	Toun Sopheen	37 – 14 June 1985	1.78 m (5 ft 10 in)		(Cambodia)
F	21	Brandon Peterson (NP)	32 – 16 December 1990	2.03 m (6 ft 8 in)	Orthodox	(Jordan)
G	24	Oscar Lopes	–	1.93 m (6 ft 4 in)		(Cambodia)

Head coach

- (Armenia) (Lebanon) Harry Savaya

Legend

- (C) Team captain
- (NP) Naturalised player
- Club field describes current pro club

=== Past Rosters ===
Team for the 2015 Southeast Asian Games:

Cambodia National Basketball Team roster
Players
Coaches

Pos.	No.	Name	Age – Date of birth	Height	Club
F	4	Som Vannak	32 – 24 April 1983	5 ft 10 in (1.78 m)
G	5	Em William	31 – 20 October 1983	5 ft 10 in (1.78 m)
C	6	Ratana Sak	32 – 29 October 1982	6 ft 0 in (1.83 m)	Laurentides Revolution	(Canada)
G	7	Dar Anthony Dominic	21 – 25 February 1994	5 ft 6 in (1.68 m)
G	8	Ouch Phanat	34 – 11 January 1981	5 ft 7 in (1.7 m)	Pate 310	(Cambodia)
C	9	Koy Jonathan	23 – 17 April 1992	5 ft 10 in (1.78 m)
F	10	Toun Sopheen	29 – 14 June 1985	5 ft 10 in (1.78 m)
F	11	Pek Mith	30 – 11 May 1985	6 ft 1 in (1.85 m)
F	12	Phatara Khvan	26 – 25 June 1988	5 ft 10 in (1.78 m)
F	13	Kim Vengngoun	31 – 13 November 1983	5 ft 11 in (1.8 m)	Davies Paints	(Cambodia)
F	14	Sok Tour	28 – 8 June 1987	5 ft 10 in (1.78 m)	Pate 310	(Cambodia)
C	15	Hour Pichbounchour	25 – 31 March 1990	6 ft 1 in (1.85 m)	Emperors	(Cambodia)

Head coach

- (Nigeria) Koledoye Austin

Assistant coach(es)

- (Cambodia) Kao Kannaly

Legend

- (C) Team captain
- Club field describes current pro club

Team for the 2017 Southeast Asian Games:

Cambodia National Basketball Team roster
Players
Coaches

Pos.	No.	Name	Age – Date of birth	Height	Club
G	4	Som Vannak	34 – 24 April 1983	1.78 m (5 ft 10 in)
F	5	Em William	33 – 20 October 1983	1.78 m (5 ft 10 in)
G	7	Dar Anthony Dominic	23 – 25 February 1994	1.67 m (5 ft 6 in)
F	10	Toun Sopheen	32 – 14 June 1985	1.78 m (5 ft 10 in)
F/C	11	Pek Mith	32 – 11 May 1985	1.85 m (6 ft 1 in)
F	15	Hour Pichbounchour	27 – 31 March 1990	1.85 m (6 ft 1 in)	Emperors	(Cambodia)
F		Daniel Meas	–	1.80 m (5 ft 11 in)
F/C	9	Tommy Chea	–	1.83 m (6 ft 0 in)
F		Patof Khvan	29 – 25 June 1988	1.86 m (6 ft 1 in)		(Canada)
F		Sophany Phon	–	1.65 m (5 ft 5 in)
C	8	Sophoeun Oeun	–	1.95 m (6 ft 5 in)
F		Dararithy Pheng	–	1.82 m (6 ft 0 in)
F		Daniel Meas	–	1.80 m (5 ft 11 in)

Head coach

- (Nigeria) Koledoye Austin

Assistant coach(es)

Legend

- (C) Team captain
- Club field describes current pro club

Team for the 2019 Southeast Asian Games:

Cambodia National Basketball Team roster
Players
Coaches

Pos.	No.	Name	Age – Date of birth	Height	Club
F	4	Tommy Chea	22 – 1 March 1997	1.83 m (6 ft 0 in)
G	5	Darrenlee Kuch Hok	20 – 19 January 1999	1.67 m (5 ft 6 in)
G	6	Alanasadonpalyo Khou	27 – 27 April 1992	1.75 m (5 ft 9 in)
G	7	Anthony Dominic Dar (C)	24 – 25 February 1995	1.67 m (5 ft 6 in)
G/F	8	Richard Hu	30 – 17 April 1989	1.90 m (6 ft 3 in)
G	9	Sureangsey Tith	23 – 13 July 1996	1.69 m (5 ft 7 in)
C	10	Sovanchandaravy Rithy	19 – 24 December 1999	1.85 m (6 ft 1 in)
G	11	Minea Met	19 – 8 March 2000	1.75 m (5 ft 9 in)	MSGS	(Cambodia)
C	12	Asean Samveasna	20 – 30 April 1999	1.87 m (6 ft 2 in)	Extra Joss Fighters	(Cambodia)
G	13	Andrew Chrissna Khvang	18 – 12 December 2000	1.75 m (5 ft 9 in)
G	15	Joseph Hoeup	22 – 11 September 1997	1.88 m (6 ft 2 in)	Hardin–Simmons University	(United States)
F	35	Rammarith So Johnathan	25 – 13 February 1994	1.88 m (6 ft 2 in)

Head coach

- (United States) Ed Scollan

Legend

- (C) Team captain
- Club field describes current pro club

== Head coach position ==
- (Cambodia) Om Tox – 196?-196?
- (Soviet Union) Otar Korkia – 1968-1970
- (Nigeria) Austin Koledoye – 2009–2017
- (United States) Ed Scollan – 2019
- (Armenia) (Lebanon) Harry Savaya – 2023–present

== 3x3 Team ==
For the first time in history, Cambodia featured both a "regular" 5x5 basketball team and a 3x3 basketball team at the 2021 Southeast Asian Games.

== See also ==
- Cambodia women's national basketball team
- Cambodia national under-18 basketball team
