= Hong Kong men's national basketball team =

Men's national basketball team

Hong Kong, China
- FIBA ranking: 115 ▲8 (1 September 2026)
- Joined FIBA: 1957
- FIBA zone: FIBA Asia
- National federation: Basketball Association of Hong Kong, China (BAHKC) 中國香港籃球總會
- Coach: Chiu Wing Leung

FIBA World Cup
- Appearances: None

FIBA Asia Cup
- Appearances: 27
- Medals: None
Home	Away

First international
- Japan 85–70 Hong Kong (Tokyo, Japan; 25 May 1958)

Biggest win
- Hong Kong 115–45 Maldives (Incheon, South Korea; 22 September 2014)

Biggest defeat
- Japan 131–38 Hong Kong (Tokyo, Japan; 1 November 1971)

The Hong Kong men's national basketball team (Chinese: 香港代表籃球隊; Cantonese Yale: Hēunggóng làahmkàuh doihbíu deuih; recognised as Hong Kong, China by FIBA) represents Hong Kong in international basketball, and is controlled by the Basketball Association of Hong Kong, China (BAHKC).

Hong Kong has made 27 appearances at the FIBA Asia Cup throughout their history. Their best performance came in the inaugural edition of the tournament in 1960, where they finished in fifth place. Hong Kong also hosted the event once, in 1983. At the Asian Games, Hong Kong has appeared 13 times.

== Competitive record ==
=== FIBA World Cup ===
FIBA World Cup record
Year	Position	Pld	W	L
(Argentina) 1950	No national representative			
(Brazil) 1954	No national representative			
(Chile) 1959	Not invited			
(Brazil) 1963	Did not qualify			
(Uruguay) 1967	Did not qualify			
(Socialist Federal Republic of Yugoslavia) 1970	Did not qualify			
(Puerto Rico) 1974	Did not qualify			
(Philippines) 1978	Did not qualify			
(Colombia) 1982	Did not qualify			
(Spain) 1986	Did not qualify			
(Argentina) 1990	Did not qualify			
(Canada) 1994	Did not qualify			
(Greece) 1998	Did not qualify			
(United States) 2002	Did not qualify			
(Japan) 2006	Did not qualify			
(Turkey) 2010	Did not qualify			
(Spain) 2014	Did not qualify			
(China) 2019	Did not qualify			
(Philippines) (Japan) (Indonesia) 2023	Did not enter			
(Qatar) 2027	Did not enter			
(France) 2031	To be determined			
Total	0/18	0	0	0

=== FIBA Asia Cup ===
FIBA Asia Cup record
Year	Position	Pld	W	L
(Philippines) 1960	5th place	6	2	4
(Taiwan) 1963	6th place	10	4	6
(Malaysia) 1965	8th place	7	2	5
(South Korea) 1967	9th place	9	1	8
(Thailand) 1969	9th place	8	0	8
(Japan) 1971	9th place	8	0	8
(Philippines) 1973	11th place	10	2	8
(Thailand) 1975	9th place	9	4	5
(Malaysia) 1977	10th place	9	4	5
(Japan) 1979	11th place	8	2	6
(India) 1981	10th place	7	2	5
(Hong Kong) 1983	7th place	6	2	4
(Malaysia) 1985	13th place	5	2	3
(Thailand) 1987	14th place	7	1	6
(China) 1989	13th place	6	2	4
(Japan) 1991	11th place	7	4	3
(Indonesia) 1993	13th place	6	2	4
(South Korea) 1995	15th place	8	2	6
(Saudi Arabia) 1997	14th place	6	1	5
(Japan) 1999	13th place	7	2	5
(China) 2001	11th place	6	3	3
(China) 2003	13th place	7	3	4
(Qatar) 2005	15th place	7	1	6
(Japan) 2007	13th place	7	3	4
(China) 2009	Did not qualify			
(China) 2011	Did not qualify			
(Philippines) 2013	10th place	7	1	6
(China) 2015	12th place	8	1	7
(Lebanon) 2017	15th place	3	0	3
(Indonesia) 2022	Did not qualify			
(Saudi Arabia) 2025	Did not qualify			
(To be determined) 2029	To be determined			
Total	27/31	194	53	141

=== Asian Games ===
Asian Games
Year	Position	Pld	W	L
(India) 1951	No national representative			
(Philippines) 1954	No national representative			
(Japan) 1958	8th place	5	2	3
(Indonesia) 1962	6th place	6	0	6
(Thailand) 1966	Did not enter			
(Thailand) 1970	12th place	8	0	8
(Iran) 1974	Did not enter			
(Thailand) 1978	11th place	9	3	6
(India) 1982	Did not enter			
(South Korea) 1986	8th place	7	0	7
(China) 1990	11th place	3	0	3
(Japan) 1994	Did not enter			
(Thailand) 1998	11th place	5	1	4
(South Korea) 2002	8th place	6	1	5
(Qatar) 2006	17th place	2	0	2
(China) 2010	15th place	1	0	1
(South Korea) 2014	13th place	3	1	2
(Indonesia) 2018	13th place	3	0	3
(China) 2022	12th place	4	1	3
(Japan) 2026	Did not enter			
Total	13/18	62	9	53

== Team ==
=== Current roster ===
Roster for the 2029 FIBA Asia Cup Pre-Qualifiers matches in August 2026.

Hong Kong men's national basketball team roster
Players
Coaches

Pos.	No.	Name	Age – Date of birth	Height	Club	Ctr.
SG	0	Glen Yang	29 – 30 August 1996	1.84 m (6 ft 0 in)	Hong Kong Bulls	(China)
G/F	1	Yeung Sui Hung	28 – 22 December 1997	1.86 m (6 ft 1 in)	HK JinNiu	(Hong Kong)
PG	8	Oliver Xu	29 – 19 December 1996	1.85 m (6 ft 1 in)	Tokushima Gambarous	(Japan)
SG	9	Tsang Cham Yuen	26 – 1 March 2000	1.83 m (6 ft 0 in)	South China AA	(Hong Kong)
PG	10	Ricky Yang	28 – 28 July 1998	1.78 m (5 ft 10 in)	Hong Kong Bulls	(China)
PG	11	Chung Tsun Ng	29 – 2 September 1996	1.81 m (5 ft 11 in)	Tycoon	(Hong Kong)
F/C	13	Pok Yuet Yeung	26 – 7 June 2000	1.99 m (6 ft 6 in)	Khovd Falcons	(Mongolia)
C	21	Ma Kong San	26 – 17 August 2000	2.08 m (6 ft 10 in)	Shandong Honey Badger	(China)
SF	23	Leung Ka Hin	26 – 1 February 2000	1.93 m (6 ft 4 in)	Eastern	(Hong Kong)
SF	32	Ivan Yang	23 – 16 June 2003	1.88 m (6 ft 2 in)	Eastern	(Hong Kong)
C	33	Duncan Reid	36 – 28 September 1989	2.04 m (6 ft 8 in)	Tycoon	(Hong Kong)
F	35	Yip Yiu Pong	27 – 18 January 1999	1.91 m (6 ft 3 in)	South China AA	(Hong Kong)

Head coach

- (Hong Kong) Chiu Wing Leung

Assistant coach(es)

- (Hong Kong) Chan Yiu Cho
- (Hong Kong) Chan Man Yung

Legend

- (C) Team captain
- (NP) Naturalized player
- Club – describes last
  club before the tournament
- Age – describes age
  on 28 August 2026

=== Depth chart ===
Pos.	Starting 5	Bench 1	Bench 2
C	Pok Yuet Yeung	Ma Kong San	Duncan Reid
PF	Yip Yiu Pong	Leung Ka Hin
SF	Glen Yang	Yeung Sui Hung	Ivan Yang
SG	Oliver Xu	Tsang Cham Yuen
PG	Ricky Yang	Chung Tsun Ng

== Past rosters ==
Roster for the 2017 FIBA Asia Cup.

Hong Kong men's national basketball team – 2017 FIBA Asia Cup roster
Players
Coaches

Pos.	No.	Name	Age – Date of birth	Height	Club	Ctr.
SG	4	Ko Wing Sang	32 – 28 March 1985	1.79 m (5 ft 10 in)	Eagles	(Hong Kong)
PG	5	Lo Yi Ting	29 – 14 November 1987	1.78 m (5 ft 10 in)	South China AA	(Hong Kong)
PG	6	Au Yeung Wai Kong	28 – 7 February 1989	1.83 m (6 ft 0 in)	Fukien	(Hong Kong)
SG	7	Lee Ki	29 – 16 October 1987	1.80 m (5 ft 11 in)	Eastern	(Hong Kong)
SG	8	Chan Siu Wing	25 – 26 April 1992	1.80 m (5 ft 11 in)	Eastern	(Hong Kong)
F	9	Adam Xu	24 – 16 February 1993	1.94 m (6 ft 4 in)	Winling	(Hong Kong)
F	10	Lin Ho Chun	26 – 21 October 1990	1.86 m (6 ft 1 in)	South China AA	(Hong Kong)
C	11	Wong Yau Tin	30 – 31 March 1987	1.96 m (6 ft 5 in)	Fukien	(Hong Kong)
PF	12	Fong Shing Yee	33 – 12 December 1983	1.96 m (6 ft 5 in)	Eastern	(Hong Kong)
PF	13	Wong Chun Wai	32 – 16 June 1985	1.98 m (6 ft 6 in)	Winling	(Hong Kong)
C	14	Duncan Reid	27 – 28 September 1989	2.04 m (6 ft 8 in)	Zhejiang Golden Bulls	(China)
SG	15	Chow Ka Kui	29 – 7 January 1988	1.81 m (5 ft 11 in)	Fukien	(Hong Kong)

Head coach

- (Hong Kong) On Hing King

Assistant coach(es)

- (Hong Kong) Chiu Wing Leung

Legend

- (C) Team captain
- (NP) Naturalized player
- Club – describes last
  club before the tournament
- Age – describes age
  on 8 August 2017

== Head coach position ==
- (Hong Kong) Yin Ming Chu – 2009
- (Hong Kong) Wai Cheung Kwong – 2010–2014
- (Hong Kong) On Hing King – 2015–2023
- (Hong Kong) Chiu Wing Leung – 2024–present

== Kit ==
=== Manufacturer ===
- 2006–2024: Nike
- 2024–present: Under Armour

=== Sponsor ===
- 2025–present: Sun Life

== See also ==
- Hong Kong men's national under-18 basketball team
- Hong Kong men's national under-16 basketball team
- Hong Kong men's national 3x3 team
- Hong Kong women's national basketball team
