= Kunihiko =

- Gender: Male

Origin
- Origin: Japanese
- Meaning: Different meanings depending on the kanji used

Kunihiko is a masculine Japanese given name. Notable people with the name include:

- Kunihiko Hashida (橋田 邦彦; 1882–1945), Japanese physician and physiologist
- Kunihiko Hashimoto (橋本 國彦; 1904–1949)}, Japanese composer
- Kunihiko Ikuhara (幾原 邦彦; born 1964), artist, anime director
- Kunihiko Iwadare (岩垂 邦彦; 1857–1941), NEC founder
- Kunihiko Kasahara (笠原 邦彦; born 1941), author of Viva! Origami (1983)
- Kunihiko Kase (加瀬邦彦, 1941–2015), composer, music producer
- Kunihiko Kato (加藤 久仁彦; born 1956), composer, lyricist, singer, actor
- Kunihiko Kodaira (小平 邦彦; 1915–1997), Japanese mathematician
- Kunihiko Mitamura (三田村 邦彦; born 1953) actor
- Kunihiko Moriguchi (森口 邦彦; born 1941), Japanese textile artist
- Kunihiko Murai (村井 邦彦; born 1945), Japanese music producer
- Kunihiko Muroi (室井 邦彦; born 1947), Japanese Democratic Party politician
- Kunihiko Nakamura (中村 邦彦; born 1939), Japanese basketball player
- Kunihiko Oshiba (大柴 邦彦; born 1976), actor
- Kunihiko Ryo (梁 邦彦; born 1960), composer, arranger
- Kunihiko Saitō (斎藤 邦彦; 1935–2022), Japanese diplomat
- Kunihiko Sakurai (桜井 邦彦; born 1972), Japanese ice hockey player
- Kunihiko Suzuki (鈴木 邦彦; born 1938), arranger
- Kunihiko Takahashi (高橋 邦彦; born 1969), pool player
- Kunihiko Take (武 邦彦; 1938–2016), trainer, former jockey
- Kunihiko Takizawa (滝澤 邦彦; born 1978), Japanese football player
- Kunihiko Tanaka (田中 久仁彦; born 1970), character designer
- Kunihiko Yasui (安井 邦彦; born 1960), Japanese voice actor
- Kunihiko Yokoyama (横山 邦彦; born 1947), Japanese basketball player
- Kunihiko Yuyama (湯山 邦彦; born 1952), Japanese director
