= Cho Hye-jin =

Cho Hye-jin may refer to:

- Cho Hye-jin (field hockey), South Korean field hockey player
- Cho Hye-jin (figure skater), Canadian-South Korean pair skater

== See also ==
- Cho Hey-jin, South Korean basketball player
