= Fu Da-ren =

Taiwanese television presenter

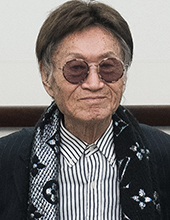
Fu in November 2017

Fu Da-ren (Chinese: 傅達仁; pinyin: Fù Dárén; 3 April 1933 – 7 June 2018) was a Taiwanese basketball player and television presenter.

Fu Da-ren was raised in an orphanage established by Soong Mei-ling after his father, Republic of China Army Major General Fu Chung-kuei (1885–1938), was killed in action during the Second Sino-Japanese War.

Fu was on the roster of the Republic of China national basketball team in the 1958 Asian Games, and won a silver medal.

In 1980, Fu received a Golden Bell Award. Several catchphrases familiar to athletes and sports fans in Taiwan were popularized by Fu during his broadcasting career.

Fu was Christian. In later life, Fu was diagnosed with pancreatic cancer, and actively supported euthanasia. His family researched options for assisted suicide, but found that although the End of Life Option Act made the procedure legal in California, no hospital in Los Angeles would accept Fu's medical records. He traveled to Switzerland in November 2017 to join Dignitas, an organization that provides assisted suicide to its members. Days later, Fu chose not to die by euthanasia and received a visit from Tsai Ing-wen upon his return to Taiwan. In May 2018, Fu flew to Zurich and underwent euthanasia on 7 June 2018, aged 85. Fu's death was filmed. The video was released to Taiwanese media in February 2019 and went viral.
