= Han Qingling =

Chinese basketball player

Personal information
- Nationality: Chinese
- Born: 16 December 1960 (age 65)

Sport
- Sport: Basketball
Medal record
Women's basketball
Representing China
Asian Games
Gold medal – first place	1986 Seoul	Team competition

Han Qingling (Chinese: 韩庆玲; pinyin: Hán Qìnglíng, born 16 December 1960) is a Chinese basketball player. She competed in the women's tournament at the 1988 Summer Olympics.
