= Kagari Yamada =

Japanese basketball player

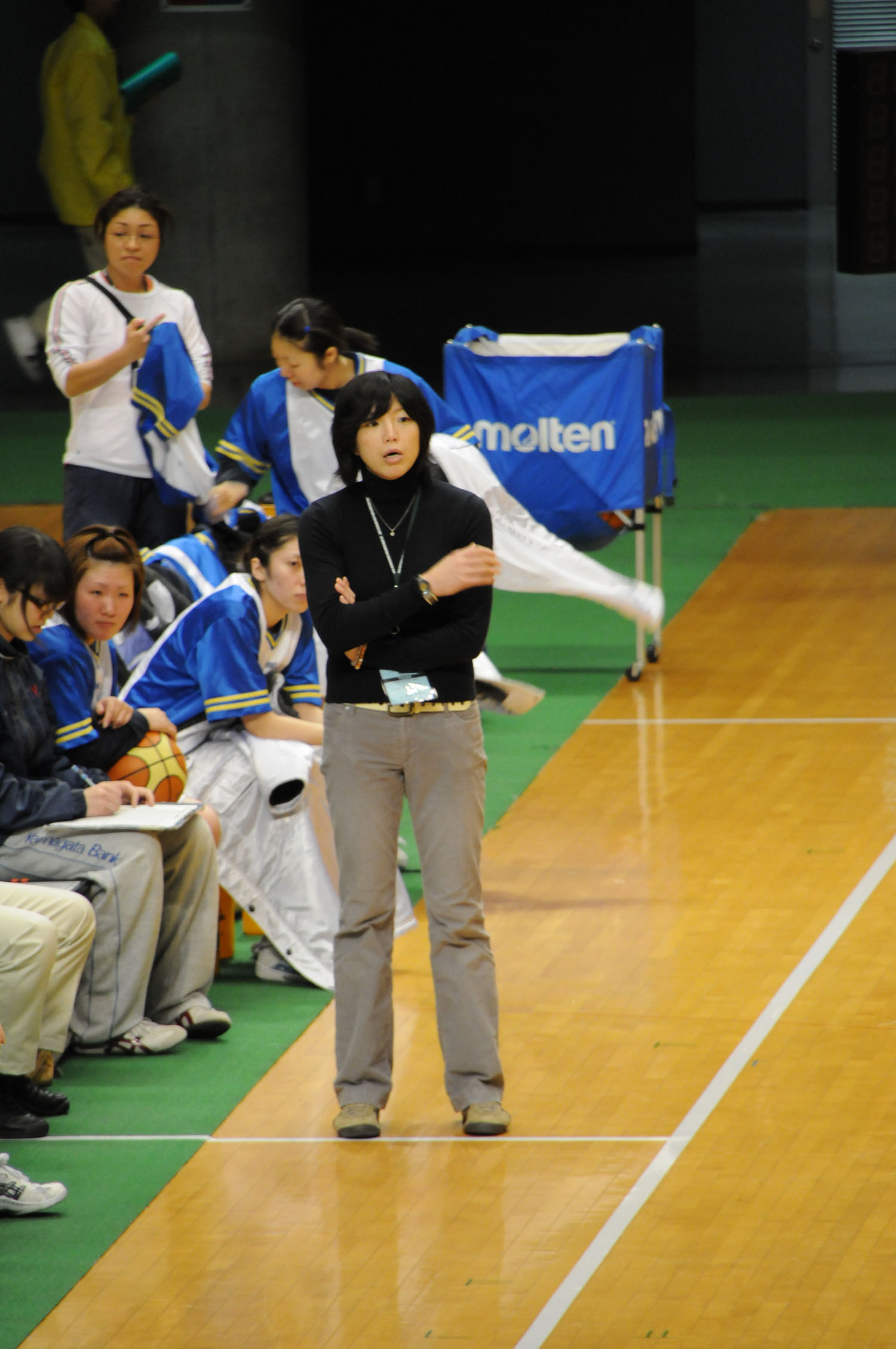
- Kagari Yamada in 2009

Personal information
- Nationality: Japanese
- Born: 4 June 1972 (age 53); Mie, Japan

Sport
- Sport: Basketball

Kagari Yamada (山田 かがり, Yamada Kagari; born 4 June 1972) is a Japanese basketball player. She competed in the women's tournament at the 1996 Summer Olympics.
