= Zhang Jingsong =

Chinese basketball player

Zhang Jingsong 张劲松
Personal information
- Born: 2 September 1973 (age 53) Taiyuan, Shanxi, China

Career information
- Playing career: 1995–2007

Career history

Playing
- 1995–2007: Bayi Rockets

Coaching
- 2007–2020: Bayi Rockets (assistant)
- 2017–2019: China U18
- 2021–2022: Xinjiang Flying Tigers (assistant)
- 2023: Beijing Royal Fighters
Medals
Men's basketball
Representing China
FIBA Asia Championship
| Gold medal – first place | 1993 Jakarta |
| Gold medal – first place | 1995 Seoul |
| Gold medal – first place | 1999 Fukuoka |
| Gold medal – first place | 2001 Shanghai |
| Gold medal – first place | 2003 Harbin |
| Gold medal – first place | 2005 Qatar |
Asian Games
| Gold medal – first place | 1994 Hiroshima |
| Gold medal – first place | 1998 Bangkok |
| Gold medal – first place | 2006 Doha |
East Asian Games
| Gold medal – first place | 2001 Osaka |
Universiade Games
| Silver medal – second place | 2001 Beijing |

Zhang Jingsong (born 2 September 1973) is a Chinese former basketball player who competed in the 2000 Summer Olympics and in the 2004 Summer Olympics.
