= Kuang Lubin =

Chinese basketball player

Kuang Lubin (simplified Chinese: 匡鲁彬; traditional Chinese: 匡魯彬; pinyin: kuāng lǔ bīn; born 26 January 1956) is a Chinese former international basketball player who competed in the 1984 Summer Olympics.
