= Bang Yeol =

South Korean basketball player (born 1941)

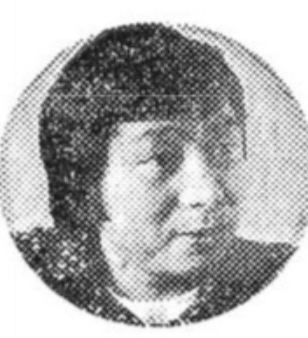

Personal information
- Nationality: South Korean
- Born: 10 October 1941 (age 84)
- Height: 178 cm (5 ft 10 in)
- Weight: 66 kg (146 lb)

Korean name
- Hangul: 방열
- RR: Bang Yeol
- MR: Pang Yŏl

Sport
- Sport: Basketball
Medal record
Representing South Korea
Men's Basketball
Asian Games
Bronze medal – third place	1962 Jakarta	Men's tournament

Bang Yeol (Korean: 방열; born 10 October 1941) is a South Korean basketball player.

He won the bronze medal at the 1962 Asian Games in Jakarta. He also competed at other international competitions, including in the men's tournament at the 1964 Summer Olympics.
