= Patof Khvan =

Canadian-born Cambodian basketball player

No. 12 – Reping Mill City
- Position: Shooting guard
- League: CBL

Personal information
- Born: June 25, 1988 (age 38) Montreal, Quebec
- Listed height: 6 ft 1 in (1.85 m)
- Listed weight: 154 lb (70 kg)

Career information
- Playing career: 2010–present

Career history
- 2010–2015: Pate 310
- 2015–present: Reping Mill City

Patof Khvan (born June 25, 1988) is a Canadian-born Cambodian professional basketball player who currently plays for the Reping Mill City in Cambodia. He was called up to the Cambodia national team at the 2013 Southeast Asian Games.
