= Kim Young-hee (basketball) =

South Korean basketball player (1963–2023)

- Hangul: 김영희
- Hanja: 金英姬
- RR: Gim Yeonghui
- MR: Kim Yŏnghŭi

Kim Young-hee
Medal record

Women's basketball

Representing South Korea

Olympic Games
Silver medal – second place	1984 Los Angeles	Team competition

Asian Games
Silver medal – second place	1982 New Delhi	Team competition
Silver medal – second place	1986 Seoul	Team competition

Kim Young-hee (Korean: 김영희; 17 May 1963 – 31 January 2023) was a South Korean basketball player who competed in the 1984 Summer Olympics. Born in Ulsan, Gyeongsangnam-do, Kim was the elder of two children, with a younger brother.

Kim died of brain cancer on 31 January 2023, at the age of 59.
