= Ramon Manulat =

Filipino basketball player (1930–2019)

Olympic medal record

Representing Philippines

Men's basketball

FIBA World Championship
Bronze medal – third place	1954 Rio de Janeiro	Team

Asian Games
Gold medal – first place	1954 Manila	Team

Ramón Manulat (1930 – September 2019 in Australia) was a Filipino basketball player. He was member of the Philippine National Team that won a gold medal at the 1954 Asian Games and a bronze medal at the 1954 FIBA World Championship. He also participated in the 1956 Summer Olympics, where his country placed seventh. Nationally, he played for the Manila Industrial and Commercial Athletic Association teams Seven-Up and Ysmael Steel.

Ramón Manulat was born to a Cuban-Spaniard father and a Filipino mother with roots to Leyte and Cebu. He grew up in Cebu and played for the Glowing Goldies of the University of Santo Tomas in Manila where he got a degree in mechanical engineering.

He was married to Maria Luisa Da Silva with whom he had three children. His family moved to Australia in 1971 and resided in Brisbane.
