= Hideo Kanekawa =

Japanese basketball player

Personal information
- Nationality: Japanese
- Born: 10 October 1936 (age 88); Aichi, Japan

Sport
- Sport: Basketball

Hideo Kanekawa (金川 英雄, Kanekawa Hideo; born 10 October 1936) is a Japanese basketball player. He competed in the men's tournament at the 1960 Summer Olympics.
