= Edward Lee (basketball) =

Chinese basketball player (1923–1988)

Personal information
- Nationality: Chinese
- Born: 1923; Philippines
- Died: 14 November 1988 (aged 64–65); Philippines

Sport
- Sport: Basketball

Edward Lee (1923 – 14 November 1988) was a Chinese basketball player. He competed in the men's tournament at the 1948 Summer Olympics.
