= Kenji Soda =

Japanese basketball player

Personal information
- Nationality: Japanese
- Born: 12 February 1948 (age 77)

Sport
- Sport: Basketball

Kenji Soda (宗田 研二, Sōda Kenji; born 12 February 1948) is a Japanese basketball player. He competed in the men's tournament at the 1972 Summer Olympics.
