= Wu Yet-an =

Taiwanese basketball player

Wu Yet-An (吳乙安)
Personal information
- Born: 26 July 1927 Changchun, China

Wu Yet-An or Ng Yuet On or Ng Yet Ang or Ng Ynet-On (Chinese: 吳乙安) (born 26 July 1927) was a basketball player who competed as part of the Republic of China's squad at the 1954 FIBA World Championship, 1954 Asian Games, and 1956 Summer Olympics and as part of the Hong Kong squad at the 1958 Asian Games.

His younger brother Sima Ling was a novelist.
