= Florentino Bautista =

Filipino basketball player (1930–2014)

Personal information
- Born: November 24, 1930
- Died: April 28, 2014 (aged 83) Kawit, Cavite, Philippines
- Listed height: 5 ft 8 in (172 cm)
Medals
Men's basketball
Representing Philippines
FIBA World Championship
| Bronze medal – third place | 1954 Rio de Janeiro | Team |
Asian Games
| Gold medal – first place | 1954 Manila | Team |

Florentino Bautista Jr. (November 24, 1930 – April 28, 2014) was a Filipino basketball player who competed in the 1952 Summer Olympics.
