= Fumihiko Moroyama =

Japanese basketball player

Personal information
- Nationality: Japanese
- Born: 14 August 1943 (age 81)

Sport
- Sport: Basketball

Fumihiko Moroyama (諸山 文彦, Moroyama Fumihiko; born 14 August 1943) is a Japanese basketball player. He competed in the men's tournament at the 1964 Summer Olympics.
