= Pons Saldaña =

Filipino basketball player (1928–2006)

Personal information
- Born: November 19, 1928 Guagua, Pampanga, Philippine Islands
- Died: July 21, 2006 (aged 77) Makati, Philippines
Medals
Men's basketball
Representing Philippines
FIBA World Championship
Bronze medal – third place	1954 Rio de Janeiro	Team
Asian Games
Gold medal – first place	1954 Manila	Team

Ponciano "Pons" B. Saldaña (November 19, 1928 – July 21, 2006) was a Filipino former basketball player who competed in the 1952 Summer Olympics.
