= Moon Hyun-chang =

South Korean basketball player

Personal information
- Nationality: South Korean
- Born: 12 May 1937 (age 88)

Sport
- Sport: Basketball

Moon Hyun-chang (born 12 May 1937) is a South Korean basketball player. He competed in the men's tournament at the 1964 Summer Olympics.
