= Takashi Masuda (basketball) =

Japanese basketball player

Personal information
- Nationality: Japanese
- Born: 5 August 1940 (age 84); Shizuoka, Japan

Sport
- Sport: Basketball

Takashi Masuda (増田 貴史, Masuda Takashi; born 5 August 1940) is a Japanese basketball player. He competed in the men's tournament at the 1960 Summer Olympics and the 1964 Summer Olympics.
