= Xu Chunmei =

Chinese basketball player

Personal information
- Nationality: Chinese
- Born: 22 March 1966 (age 59); Wuhan, China

Sport
- Sport: Basketball

Xu Chunmei (Chinese: 徐春梅, born 22 March 1966) is a Chinese basketball player. She competed in the women's tournament at the 1988 Summer Olympics. She had a brief career in South Korea's Women's Korean Basketball League in 2000 and 2001, when she was already in her mid-30s and a mother of one.
