= Hitoshi Konno =

Japanese basketball player

Personal information
- Nationality: Japanese
- Born: 3 January 1934 (age 91)

Sport
- Sport: Basketball

Hitoshi Konno (紺野 仁, Konno Hitoshi; born 3 January 1934) is a Japanese basketball player. He competed in the men's tournament at the 1956 Summer Olympics.
