= Cho Mun-chu =

South Korean basketball player (born 1964)

Personal information
- Nationality: South Korean
- Born: 29 July 1964 (age 61) Seoul, South Korea

Sport
- Sport: Basketball

Korean name
- Hangul: 조문주
- Hanja: 趙文珠
- RR: Jo Munju
- MR: Cho Munju

Cho Mun-chu (Korean: 조문주; also transliterated Jo Mun-ju, born 29 July 1964) is a South Korean basketball player. She competed in the women's tournament at the 1988 Summer Olympics.
