= Riichi Arai =

Japanese basketball player (born 1933)

Personal information
- Nationality: Japanese
- Born: 16 August 1933 (age 91); Okaya, Japan

Sport
- Sport: Basketball

Riichi Arai (born 16 August 1933) is a Japanese basketball player. He competed in the men's tournament at the 1956 Summer Olympics.
