= Lee Byung-goo =

South Korean basketball player

Personal information
- Nationality: South Korean
- Born: 20 June 1942 (age 83) Seoul, Korea

Sport
- Sport: Basketball

Lee Byung-goo (born 20 June 1942) is a South Korean basketball player. He competed in the men's tournament at the 1964 Summer Olympics and the 1968 Summer Olympics.
