= Atsushi Somatomo =

Japanese basketball player

Personal information
- Nationality: Japanese
- Born: 10 June 1949 (age 76)

Sport
- Sport: Basketball

Atsushi Somatomo (杣友 厚, Somatomo Atsushi; born 10 June 1949) is a Japanese basketball player. He competed in the men's tournament at the 1972 Summer Olympics.
