= Yung Pi-hock =

Taiwanese basketball player (born 1930)

Yung Pi-Hock (楊 比福)
Personal information
- Born: 4 November 1930

Yung Pi-hock (Chinese: 楊 比福, born 4 November 1930) is a Taiwanese former basketball player. He competed as part of the Republic of China's squad at the 1956 Summer Olympics.
