= Manabu Fujita =

Japanese basketball player (born 1933)

Personal information
- Nationality: Japanese
- Born: 22 March 1933 (age 92)

Sport
- Sport: Basketball

Manabu Fujita (born 22 March 1933) is a Japanese basketball player. He competed in the men's tournament at the 1956 Summer Olympics.
