= Yoo Hi-hyung =

South Korean basketball player

Personal information
- Nationality: South Korean
- Born: 10 March 1949 (age 76); Chungson, Korea

Sport
- Sport: Basketball

Yoo Hi-hyung (born 10 March 1949) is a South Korean basketball player. He competed in the men's tournament at the 1968 Summer Olympics.
