= Kwak Hyun-chae =

South Korean basketball player

Personal information
- Nationality: South Korean
- Born: 20 July 1947 (age 78); Yeosu, Korea

Sport
- Sport: Basketball

Kwak Hyun-chae (born 20 July 1947) is a South Korean basketball player. He competed in the men's tournament at the 1968 Summer Olympics.
