= Kenichi Imaizumi =

Japanese basketball player

Personal information
- Nationality: Japanese
- Born: 13 March 1934 (age 91); Niigata, Japan

Sport
- Sport: Basketball

Kenichi Imaizumi (born 13 March 1934) is a Japanese basketball player. He competed in the men's tournament at the 1956 Summer Olympics and the 1960 Summer Olympics.
