= Ha Ui-kon =

South Korean basketball player

Ha Ui-geon
Personal information
- Nationality: South Korean
- Born: 3 May 1943; Busan, Korea
- Died: 10 May 2020 (aged 77)

Sport
- Sport: Basketball

Ha Ui-kon (3 May 1943 – 10 May 2020) was a South Korean basketball player. He competed in the men's tournament at the 1964 Summer Olympics and the 1968 Summer Olympics.
