= Masashi Shiga =

Japanese basketball player

Personal information
- Nationality: Japanese
- Born: 28 January 1939 (age 86); Iwaki, Japan

Sport
- Sport: Basketball

Masashi Shiga (志賀 政司, Shiga Masashi; born 28 January 1939) is a Japanese basketball player. He competed in the men's tournament at the 1960 Summer Olympics and the 1964 Summer Olympics.
