= Sha Guoli =

Chinese basketball player

Sha Guoli (born 30 August 1960) is a Chinese former basketball player who competed in the 1988 Summer Olympics.
