= Kazufumi Sakai =

Japanese basketball player

Personal information
- Nationality: Japanese
- Born: 2 October 1947 (age 77)

Sport
- Sport: Basketball

Kazufumi Sakai (坂井 和史, Sakai Kazufumi; born 2 October 1947) is a Japanese basketball player. He competed in the men's tournament at the 1972 Summer Olympics.
