= Akira Kodama =

Japanese basketball player

Personal information
- Nationality: Japanese
- Born: 20 March 1944 (age 81)

Sport
- Sport: Basketball

Akira Kodama (小玉 晃, Kodama Akira; born 20 March 1944) is a Japanese basketball player. He competed in the men's tournament at the 1964 Summer Olympics.
