= Xu Xiaoliang =

Chinese basketball player

Xu Xiaoliang (born 30 January 1962) is a Chinese former basketball player who competed in the 1988 Summer Olympics.
