= Lee Won-woo =

South Korean basketball player

Personal information
- Born: August 19, 1958
- Died: May 24, 2004 (aged 45)
Medals
Men's basketball
Representing South Korea
FIBA Asia Championship
Silver medal – second place	1987 Bangkok	Team
Silver medal – second place	1989 Beijing	Team
Asian Games
Silver medal – second place	1986 Seoul	Team
Bronze medal – third place	1990 Beijing	Team

Lee Won-Woo (Korean: 이원우, August 19, 1958 – May 24, 2004) was a South Korean basketball player.

He played as a shooting guard. He is 188 cm (6 ft 2 in) tall. He competed at the 1988 Seoul Olympic Games, where the South Korean team finished in ninth position.

His former teams include Hyundai Electronics, and he coached the national wheelchair basketball team at the 2002 FESPIC Games.

He died of a brain tumor in Seoul on May 24, 2004.
