= Kim Mu-hyun =

South Korean basketball player

Personal information
- Nationality: South Korean
- Born: 16 June 1941 (age 84); Seoul, Korea

Sport
- Sport: Basketball

Kim Mu-hyun (born 16 June 1941) is a South Korean basketball player. He competed in the men's tournament at the 1964 Summer Olympics and the 1968 Summer Olympics.
