= Lee Kum-jin =

South Korean basketball player

Personal information
- Nationality: South Korean
- Born: 1 February 1965 (age 61)

Sport
- Sport: Basketball

Korean name
- Hangul: 이금진
- Hanja: 李金眞
- RR: I Geumjin
- MR: I Kŭmjin

Lee Kum-jin (born 1 February 1965) is a South Korean basketball player. She competed in the women's tournament at the 1988 Summer Olympics.
