= Huang Yunlong =

Chinese basketball player (born 1960)

Huang Yunlong 黄云龙
Personal information
- Born: 10 July 1960 (age 66) Quanzhou, Fujian, China

Career information
- Playing career: 1975–1999
- Coaching career: 2003–present

Career history

Playing
- 1995–1999: Bayi Rockets

Coaching
- 2003–2011: Tsinghua University
Medals
Men's basketball
Representing China
FIBA Asia Cup
Gold medal – first place	1981 Kolkata
Gold medal – first place	1983 Hong Kong
Bronze medal – third place	1985 Kuala Lumpur
Gold medal – first place	1987 Bangkok
Asian Games
Gold medal – first place	1986 Seoul

Huang Yunlong (born 10 July 1960) is a Chinese former basketball player who competed in the 1984 Summer Olympics and in the 1988 Summer Olympics.
