= Woo Eun-kyung =

South Korean basketball player

Personal information
- Nationality: South Korean
- Born: 19 August 1962 (age 62)

Sport
- Sport: Basketball

Korean name
- Hangul: 우은경
- Hanja: 禹恩京
- RR: U Eungyeong
- MR: U Ŭn'gyŏng

Woo Eun-kyung (born 19 August 1962) is a South Korean basketball player. She competed in the women's tournament at the 1988 Summer Olympics.
