= Satoshi Mori (basketball) =

Japanese basketball player (born 1949)

Personal information
- Nationality: Japanese
- Born: 10 May 1949 (age 76)

Sport
- Sport: Basketball

Satoshi Mori (森 哲, Mori Satoshi; born 10 May 1949) is a Japanese basketball player. He competed in the men's tournament at the 1972 Summer Olympics and the 1976 Summer Olympics.
