= Yasukuni Oshima =

Japanese basketball player

Personal information
- Nationality: Japanese
- Born: 8 June 1938 (age 87); Tokyo, Japan

Sport
- Sport: Basketball

Yasukuni Oshima (born 8 June 1938) is a Japanese basketball player. He competed in the men's tournament at the 1960 Summer Olympics.
