= Cho Hey-jin =

South Korean basketball player

Personal information
- Nationality: South Korean
- Born: 25 September 1973 (age 53) Suwon, Gyeonggi-do, South Korea
- Occupation: Basketball player
Medal record
Women's basketball
Representing South Korea
Asian Games
Gold medal – first place	1994 Hiroshima	Team competition
Bronze medal – third place	1998 Bangkok	Team competition

Korean name
- Hangul: 조혜진
- RR: Jo Hyejin
- MR: Cho Hyejin

Cho Hey-jin (born 25 September 1973) is a South Korean former basketball player who competed in the 2004 Summer Olympics.
