= Shutaro Shoji =

Japanese basketball player

Personal information
- Nationality: Japanese
- Born: 12 November 1933; Yamagata, Japan
- Died: 15 January 2017 (aged 83); Fujisawa, Kanagawa

Sport
- Sport: Basketball

Shutaro Shoji (東海林 周太郎, 12 November 1933 – 15 January 2017) was a Japanese basketball player. He competed in the men's tournament at the 1956 Summer Olympics and the 1960 Summer Olympics.
