= Mariano Tolentino =

Filipino basketball player (1928–1998)

Personal information
- Born: June 22, 1928 Cavite City, Cavite, Philippine Islands
- Died: 1998 (aged 69–70)
- Listed height: 6 ft 2 in (188 cm)
- Listed weight: 161 lb (73 kg)
Medals
Men's basketball
Representing Philippines
FIBA World Championship
Bronze medal – third place	1954 Rio de Janeiro	Team
ABC Championship
Gold medal – first place	1960 Manila	Team
Asian Games
Gold medal – first place	1951 New Delhi	Team
Gold medal – first place	1954 Manila	Team
Gold medal – first place	1958 Tokyo	Team

Mariano "Nano" Tolentino (June 22, 1928 – 1998) was a Filipino basketball player who played for the national team competed in the 1952 Summer Olympics and in the 1956 Summer Olympics.

He was part of the national men's basketball team who won three consecutive Asiad medals and bronze medal in the 1954 World Basketball Championship.

He was inducted into the Philippine Sports Hall of Fame for his achievements in the sport of Basketball on January 25, 2016.
