= Takeo Sugiyama =

Japanese basketball player

Personal information
- Nationality: Japanese
- Born: 8 May 1933 (age 92); Kanagawa, Japan

Sport
- Sport: Basketball

Takeo Sugiyama (杉山 武雄, Sugiyama Takeo; born 8 May 1933) is a Japanese basketball player. He competed in the men's tournament at the 1956 Summer Olympics and the 1960 Summer Olympics.
