= Tong Suet-fong =

Taiwanese basketball player (born 1932)

Tong Suet-Fong (唐雪舫)
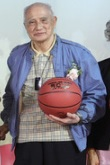
- Tong in 2022

Personal information
- Born: 13 December 1932 (age 93)

Tong Suet-fong (Chinese: 唐雪舫; born 13 December 1932) is a Taiwanese basketball player. He competed as part of the Republic of China's squad at the 1956 Summer Olympics. He was educated at Central Police University and Northwestern University, and led the Taipei City Government's Department of Transportation. In 2022, Tong was a member of the inaugural class inducted into the Taiwan Basketball Hall of Fame.
