= Ling Jing-huan =

Taiwanese basketball player

Ling Jing-huan (凌 鏡寰)
Personal information
- Born: 7 April 1927
- Died: 14 July 2012 (aged 85)

Ling Jing-huan (Chinese: 凌鏡寰; pinyin: Líng Jìnghuán; 7 April 1927 – 14 July 2012) was a Taiwanese basketball player. He competed as part of the Republic of China's squad at the 1956 Summer Olympics.
