= Hoo Cha-pen =

Taiwanese basketball player

Hoo Cha-Pen (霍劍平)
Personal information
- Born: c. 1924 Hubei, Republic of China
- Died: 17 April 2004 (aged 80)

Hoo Cha-pen (Chinese: 霍劍平; pinyin: Huò Jiànpíng; c. 1924 – 17 April 2004) was a Taiwanese basketball player and coach. He was born in Hubei, China and graduated from the Department of Education of Anhui University. He competed as part of the Republic of China's squad at the 1956 Summer Olympics, and later served as head coach of the Republic of China men's basketball team.
