= Kunihiko Nakamura =

Japanese basketball player

Personal information
- Nationality: Japanese
- Born: 24 September 1939
- Died: 9 September 2021 (aged 81)

Sport
- Sport: Basketball

Kunihiko Nakamura (中村 邦彦, Nakamura Kunihiko; 24 September 1939 – 9 September 2021) was a Japanese basketball player. He competed in the men's tournament at the 1964 Summer Olympics.
