= Takashi Itoyama =

Japanese basketball player

Personal information
- Nationality: Japanese
- Born: 14 November 1936; Hyogo, Japan
- Died: 17 August 1983 (aged 46)

Sport
- Sport: Basketball

Takashi Itoyama (糸山 隆司, Itoyama Takashi; born 14 November 1936 – 17 August 1983) is a Japanese basketball player. He competed in the men's tournament at the 1956 Summer Olympics and the 1960 Summer Olympics.
