= Wang Yih-jiun =

Taiwanese basketball player

Wang Yih-Jiun (王 毅軍)
Personal information
- Born: 17 May 1927

Wang Yih-jiun (Chinese: 王毅軍) (born 17 May 1927) is a Taiwanese former basketball player. He competed as part of the Republic of China's squad at the 1956 Summer Olympics.
