= Shoji Kamata =

Japanese basketball player

Personal information
- Nationality: Japanese
- Born: 17 April 1935 (age 91) Tokyo, Japan

Sport
- Sport: Basketball

Shoji Kamata (鎌田 正司, Kamata Shōji; born 17 April 1935) is a Japanese basketball player. He competed in the men's tournament at the 1960 Summer Olympics.
