= Hiroshi Saito (basketball) =

Japanese basketball player

Personal information
- Nationality: Japanese
- Born: 15 September 1933; Tokyo, Japan
- Died: 10 November 2011 (aged 78)

Sport
- Sport: Basketball

Hiroshi Saito (斎藤 博, Saitō Hiroshi; 15 September 1933 – 10 November 2011) is a Japanese basketball player. He competed in the men's tournament at the 1956 Summer Olympics and the 1960 Summer Olympics.
