= Kunihiko Yokoyama =

Japanese basketball player

Personal information
- Nationality: Japanese
- Born: 17 March 1947 (age 78)

Sport
- Sport: Basketball

Kunihiko Yokoyama (横山 邦彦, Yokoyama Kunihiko; born 17 March 1947) is a Japanese basketball player. He competed in the men's tournament at the 1972 Summer Olympics.
