= Setsuo Nara =

Japanese basketball player

Personal information
- Born: 16 December 1936 Kosaka, Akita, Japan
- Died: 27 January 2000 (aged 63)
- Listed height: 5 ft 9 in (1.75 m)
- Listed weight: 150 lb (68 kg)

Career information
- High school: Kawasaki (Kawasaki-ku, Kawasaki)
- College: Rikkyo University

Career history

Playing
- 1959-?: Nippon Mining

Coaching
- ?-?: Japan (asst)

Career highlights
- Emperor's Cup Champions
Medals
Men's basketball
Representing Japan
Asian Games
Bronze medal – third place	1958 Tokyo	Japan
Silver medal – second place	1962 Jakarta	Japan

Setsuo Nara (奈良 節雄, Nara Setsuo; 16 December 1936 – 27 January 2000) was a Japanese basketball player. He competed in the men's tournament at the 1956 Summer Olympics, the 1960 Summer Olympics, and the 1964 Summer Olympics.
