= Lai Lam-kwong =

Taiwanese basketball player

Lai Lam-Kwong (賴 連光)
Personal information
- Born: 21 June 1927
- Died: 8 February 2016 (aged 88)

Lai Lam-kwong (Chinese: 賴連光; pinyin: Lài Liánguāng; 21 June 1927 – 8 February 2016) was a Taiwanese basketball player. He competed as part of the Republic of China's squad at the 1956 Summer Olympics.
