= Kaoru Wakabayashi =

Japanese basketball player

Personal information
- Nationality: Japanese
- Born: 19 August 1938 (age 86); Tokyo, Japan

Sport
- Sport: Basketball

Kaoru Wakabayashi (若林 薫, Wakabayashi Kaoru; born 19 August 1938) is a Japanese basketball player. He competed in the men's tournament at the 1960 Summer Olympics and the 1964 Summer Olympics.
