= Choi Jong-kyu =

South Korean basketball player

Personal information
- Nationality: South Korean
- Born: 20 November 1946 (age 78); Seoul, Korea

Sport
- Sport: Basketball

Choi Jong-kyu (born 20 November 1946) is a South Korean basketball player. He competed in the men's tournament at the 1968 Summer Olympics.
