= Park Han =

South Korean basketball player

Personal information
- Nationality: South Korean
- Born: 15 December 1945 (age 79); Seoul, Korea

Sport
- Sport: Basketball

Park Han (born 15 December 1945) is a South Korean basketball player. He competed in the men's tournament at the 1968 Summer Olympics.
