= Kim In-kun =

South Korean basketball player

Personal information
- Nationality: South Korean
- Born: 11 March 1944 (age 82) Seoul, Korea

Korean name
- Hangul: 김인건
- Hanja: 金仁建
- RR: Gim Ingeon
- MR: Kim In'gŏn

Sport
- Sport: Basketball

Kim In-kun (Korean: 김인건; born 11 March 1944) is a South Korean basketball player. He competed in the men's tournament at the 1964 Summer Olympics and the 1968 Summer Olympics.
