= Lee In-pyo =

South Korean basketball player

Personal information
- Nationality: South Korean
- Born: 8 March 1943 (age 82); Seoul, Korea

Sport
- Sport: Basketball

Lee In-pyo (born 8 March 1943) is a South Korean basketball player. He competed in the men's tournament at the 1968 Summer Olympics.
