= Kim Young-il (basketball) =

South Korean basketball player

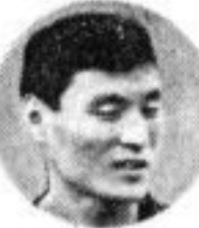

Personal information
- Nationality: South Korean
- Born: 25 February 1942 (age 84) Seoul, Korea

Sport
- Sport: Basketball

Kim Young-il (born 25 February 1942) is a South Korean former basketball player. He competed in the men's tournament at the 1964 Summer Olympics and the 1968 Summer Olympics.
