= Australia at the 1988 Summer Olympics =

- IOC code: AUS
- NOC: Australian Olympic Federation

in Seoul
- Competitors: 252 (180 men and 72 women) in 24 sports
- Flag bearers: Ric Charlesworth (opening); Debbie Flintoff-King (closing)
- Medals Ranked 15th: Gold 3 Silver 6 Bronze 5 Total 14

Summer Olympics appearances (overview)
- 1896; 1900; 1904; 1908; 1912; 1920; 1924; 1928; 1932; 1936; 1948; 1952; 1956; 1960; 1964; 1968; 1972; 1976; 1980; 1984; 1988; 1992; 1996; 2000; 2004; 2008; 2012; 2016; 2020; 2024; 2028

Other related appearances
- 1906 Intercalated Games –––– Australasia (1908–1912)

Australia competed at the 1988 Summer Olympics in Seoul, South Korea. 252 competitors, 180 men and 72 women, took part in 145 events in 24 sports. Australian athletes have competed in every Summer Olympic Games of the modern era.

== Medalists ==
Medal	Name	Sport	Event	Date
Gold	Duncan Armstrong	Swimming	Men's 200 metre freestyle	19 September
Gold	Debbie Flintoff-King	Athletics	Women's 400 metres hurdles	28 September
Gold	Australia women's national field hockey team: Kathleen Partridge; Elspeth Clement; Liane Tooth; Loretta Dorman; Lorraine Hillas; Michelle Capes; Sandra Pisani; Deborah Bowman; Lee Capes; Kim Small; Sally Carbon; Jackie Pereira; Tracey Belbin; Rechelle Hawkes; Sharon Patmore; Maree Fish	Field hockey	Women's tournament	30 September
Silver	Martin Vinnicombe	Cycling	Men's track time trial	20 September
Silver	Dean Woods	Cycling	Men's individual pursuit	22 September
Silver	Lisa Martin	Athletics	Women's marathon	23 September
Silver	Duncan Armstrong	Swimming	Men's 400 metre freestyle	23 September
Silver	Grant Davies	Canoeing	Men's K-1 1000 metres	1 October
Silver	Grahame Cheney	Boxing	Light welterweight	2 October
Bronze	Gary Neiwand	Cycling	Men's sprint	24 September
Bronze	Brett Dutton; Wayne McCarney; Stephen McGlede; Scott McGrory; Dean Woods	Cycling	Men's team pursuit	24 September
Bronze	Julie McDonald	Swimming	Women's 800 metre freestyle	24 September
Bronze	Liz Smylie; Wendy Turnbull	Tennis	Women's doubles	28 September
Bronze	Peter Foster; Kelvin Graham	Canoeing	Men's K-2 1000 metres	1 October

== Competitors ==
The following is the list of number of competitors in the Games.

Sport	Men	Women	Total
Archery	3	0	3
Athletics	16	12	28
Basketball	11	11	22
Boxing	4	–	4
Canoeing	8	0	8
Cycling	13	4	17
Diving	3	2	5
Equestrian	8	2	10
Fencing	1	1	2
Field hockey	16	16	32
Football	17	–	17
Gymnastics	1	2	3
Judo	3	–	3
Modern pentathlon	1	–	1
Rowing	16	0	16
Sailing	11	2	13
Shooting	10	2	12
Swimming	14	11	25
Synchronized swimming	–	2	2
Table tennis	1	2	3
Tennis	3	3	6
Water polo	13	–	13
Weightlifting	4	–	4
Wrestling	3	–	3
Total	180	72	252

== Archery ==
In the fifth Olympic archery competition that Australia contested, the nation sent only men. They were not successful, with Simon Fairweather's 16th place the best ranking any individual received. The Australians did not qualify for the team semifinal.

Men

Athlete	Event	Ranking round		Eighth-final		Quarterfinal		Semifinal		Final	
Athlete	Event	Score	Rank	Score	Rank	Score	Rank	Score	Rank	Score	Rank
Christopher Blake	Individual	1228	41	Did not advance							
Simon Fairweather	Individual	1276	11	322	3	316	16	Did not advance			
Rodney Wagner	Individual	1184	63	Did not advance							
Simon Fairweather; Christopher Blake; Rodney Wagner	Team	3688	13					Did not advance			

== Athletics ==
=== Men's Competition ===
Men's 200m

- Mark Garner
  - Heat – 21.09
  - Quarterfinals – 21.08 (→ did not advance, 26th place)

Men's 400m

- Robert Stone
  - Heat – 46.52
  - Quarterfinals – 46.04 (→ did not advance, 25th place)
- Miles Murphy
  - Heat – 46.38
  - Quarterfinals – 45.93 (→ did not advance, 23rd place)

Men's 1,500m

- Pat Scammel
  - Heat – 3:45.21 (→ did not advance, 35th place)

Men's 5,000m

- Andrew Lloyd
  - Heat – 13:47.87
  - Semifinals – 13:42.49 (→ did not advance, 24th place)

Men's 10,000m

- Andrew Lloyd
  - Heat – did not finish (→ did not advance, no ranking)

Men's Marathon

- Steve Moneghetti
  - Final – 2"11.49 (→ 5th place)
- Robert De Castella
  - Final – 2"13.07 (→ 8th place)
- Bradley Camp
  - Final – 2"23.49 (→ 41st place)

Men's 4 × 400 m Relay

- Robert Ballard, Mark Garner, Leigh Miller, and Miles Murphy
  - Heat – 3:05.93
- Miles Murphy, Mark Garner, Robert Ballard, and Darren Clark
  - Semi-final – 3:06.63
- Robert Ballard, Mark Garner, Miles Murphy, and Darren Clark
  - Final – 3:02.49 (→ 6th place)

Men's 400m Hurdles

- Leigh Miller
  - Heat – 50.53 (→ did not advance, 21st place)

Men's Long Jump

- David Culbert
  - Qualification – 7.64m (→ did not advance)

Men's Decathlon

- Simon Shirley – 8036 points (→ 15th place)

1. 100 metres – 11.03s
2. Long Jump – 7.45m
3. Shot Put – 14.20m
4. High Jump – 1.97m
5. 400 metres – 48.84s
6. 110m Hurdles – 15.44s
7. Discus Throw – 41.68m
8. Pole Vault – 4.70m
9. Javelin Throw – 64.00m
10. 1.500 metres – 4:27.48s

Men's 20 km Walk

- Simon Baker
  - Final – 1:21:47.0 (→ 11th place)
- Andrew Jachno
  - Final – 1:24:52.0 (→ 28th place)

Men's 50 km Walk

- Simon Baker
  - Final – 3:44:07.0 (→ 6th place)
- Andrew Jachno
  - Final – 3:53:23.0 (→ 19th place)

Men's Discus Throw

- Werner Reiterer
  - Qualification – 59.78m (→ did not advance, 15th place)

=== Women's Competition ===
Women's 100m

- Kerry Johnson
  - Heat – 11.44
  - Quarterfinals – 11.42 (→ did not advance, 24th place)

Women's 200m

- Kerry Johnson
  - Heat – 23.20
  - Quarterfinals – 23.01 (→ did not advance, 18th place)

Women's 400m

- Maree Holland
  - Heat – 52.29
  - Quarterfinals – 50.90
  - Semifinals – 50.24
  - Final – 51.25 (→ 8th place)

Women's 3,000m

- Jackie Perkins
  - Heat – 9:01.82 (→ did not advance, 22nd place)

Women's 10,000m

- Carolyn Schuwalow
  - Heat – 32:10.05
  - Final – 32:45.07 (→ 17th place)
- Jackie Perkins
  - Heat – 33:45.22 (→ did not advance, 31st place)

Women's 4 × 400 m Relay

- Debbie Flintoff-King, Maree Holland, Kerry Johnson, and Jenny Laurendet
  - Heat – did not start (→ no ranking)

Women's Marathon

- Lisa Martin
  - Final – 2:25:53 (→ Silver Medal)

Women's 100m Hurdles

- Jane Flemming
  - Heat – 13.53
  - Quarterfinals – did not start (→ did not advance, no ranking)

Women's 400m Hurdles

- Debbie Flintoff-King
  - Heat – 54.99
  - Semifinals – 54.00
  - Final – 53.17 (→ Gold Medal)
- Sally Fleming
  - Heat – 56.08 (→ did not advance, 19th place)
- Jenny Laurendet
  - Heat – 56.44 (→ did not advance, 21st place)

Women's High Jump

- Christine Stanton
  - Qualification – 1.92m
  - Final – 1.93m (→ 7th place)
- Vanessa Browne
  - Qualification – 1.90m (→ did not advance, 13th place)

Women's Long Jump

- Nicole Boegman
  - Qualification – 6.72m
  - Final – 6.73m (→ 5th place)

Women's Heptathlon

- Jane Flemming
  - final result – 6351 points (→ 7th place)

== Basketball ==
Summary

Team	Event	Group Stage						Quarterfinal	Semifinal	Final / BM	
Team	Event	Opposition score	Opposition score	Opposition score	Opposition score	Opposition score	Rank	Opposition score	Opposition score	Opposition score	Rank
Australia men's	Men's tournament	Puerto Rico; W 81–77	Soviet Union; L 69–91	Central African Republic; W 106–67	Yugoslavia; L 78–98	South Korea; W 95–75	3 Q	Spain; W 77–74	Yugoslavia; L 70–91	United States; L 49–78	4
Australia women's	Women's tournament	South Korea; L 55–91	Bulgaria; W 63–57	Soviet Union; W 60–48	N/A	N/A	1 Q	N/A	Yugoslavia; L 56–57	Soviet Union; L 53–68	4

=== Men's tournament ===
Team roster

The following is the Australia roster in the men's basketball tournament of the 1988 Summer Olympics.

Australia men's national basketball team – 1988 Summer Olympics roster
Players
Coaches

Pos.	No.	Name	Age – Date of birth	Height	Club	Ctr.
SG	4	Darryl Pearce	27 – 15 October 1960	1.91 m (6 ft 3 in)
PF	5	Robert Sibley	22 – 10 July 1966	1.99 m (6 ft 6 in)
PG	6	Phil Smyth	30 – 11 May 1958	1.83 m (6 ft 0 in)
PF	7	Larry Sengstock	28 – 4 March 1960	1.98 m (6 ft 6 in)
G/F	8	Damian Keogh	26 – 1 February 1962	1.94 m (6 ft 4 in)
	9	Wayne Carroll	29 – 16 February 1959
C	10	Luc Longley	19 – 19 January 1969	2.20 m (7 ft 3 in)
G	11	Andrew Gaze	23 – 24 July 1965	2.01 m (6 ft 7 in)
C	12	Mark Bradtke	19 – 27 September 1968	2.09 m (6 ft 10 in)
F/C	13	Brad Dalton	29 – 12 September 1959	2.03 m (6 ft 8 in)
F	14	Andrew Vlahov	19 – 1 April 1969	2.00 m (6 ft 7 in)
F/C	15	Ray Borner	26 – 27 May 1962	2.08 m (6 ft 10 in)

Head coach

Adrian Hurley

Legend

- Club – describes last
  club before the tournament
- Age – describes age
  on 17 September 1988

Group play

Pos	Team	Pld	W	L	PF	PA	PD	Pts	Qualification
1	Yugoslavia	5	4	1	468	384	+84	9 (Note: Head-to-head record: Yugoslavia 1–0 Soviet Union)	Quarterfinals
2	Soviet Union	5	4	1	460	393	+67	9	Quarterfinals
3	Australia	5	3	2	429	408	+21	8 (Note: Head-to-head record: Australia 1–0 Puerto Rico)	Quarterfinals
4	Puerto Rico	5	3	2	382	387	−5	8	Quarterfinals
5	Central African Republic	5	1	4	346	436	−90	6	9th–12th classification round
6	South Korea (H)	5	0	5	384	461	−77	5	9th–12th classification round

Source: FIBA archive
Rules for classification: 1) points; 2) head-to-head points; 3) head-to-head goal average; 4) head-to-head number of points scored.
(H) Hosts
Notes:

18 September 1988

Australia	81–77	Puerto Rico
Scoring by half: 50–36, 31–41

Jamsil Gymnasium, Seoul

20 September 1988

Australia	69–91	Soviet Union
Scoring by half: 35–53, 34–38

Jamsil Gymnasium, Seoul

21 September 1988

Australia	106–67	Central African Republic
Scoring by half: 57–35, 49–32

Jamsil Gymnasium, Seoul

23 September 1988

Australia	78–98	Yugoslavia
Scoring by half: 43–52, 35–46

Jamsil Gymnasium, Seoul

24 September 1988

Australia	95–75	South Korea
Scoring by half: 51–39, 44–36

Jamsil Gymnasium, Seoul

Quarterfinals

26 September 1988
16:30

Boxscore

Spain	74–77	Australia
Scoring by half: 40–41, 34–36
Pts: San Epifanio 17; Rebs: Martínez, Jiménez 7 Asts: Montero 3		Pts: Gaze 28; Rebs: Sengstock 5 Asts: 4 players 1

Jamsil Gymnasium, Seoul

Semifinals

28 September 1988

Boxscore

Yugoslavia	91–70	Australia
Scoring by half: 44–31, 47–39
Pts: Petrović 24; Rebs: Divac 10; Asts: Petrović 3		Pts: Gaze 27; Rebs: Borner, Vlahov 4 Asts: Sengstock 4

Jamsil Gymnasium, Seoul

Bronze medal match

29 September 1988
21:30

Boxscore

Australia	49–78	United States
Scoring by half: 29–52, 20–26
Pts: Gaze 17; Rebs: Sengstock 6 Asts: Smyth 2		Pts: Majerle, Richmond, Robinson 12; Rebs: Richmond, Robinson 7 Asts: Richmond 2

Jamsil Gymnasium, Seoul

=== Women's tournament ===
Team roster

The following is the Australia roster in the women's basketball tournament of the 1988 Summer Olympics.

Australia women's national basketball team – 1988 Summer Olympics roster
Players
Coaches

Pos.	No.	Name	Age – Date of birth	Height	Club	Ctr.
	4	Robyn Maher	28 – 6 October 1959	1.78 m (5 ft 10 in)
G	5	Sandy Brondello	20 – 20 August 1968	1.70 m (5 ft 7 in)
	6	Jenny Cheesman	30 – 2 November 1957
PG	7	Michele Timms	23 – 28 June 1965	1.64 m (5 ft 5 in)
	8	Donna Brown	24 – 12 October 1963
	9	Patricia Mickan	31 – 12 March 1957
	10	Julie Nykiel	19 – 13 December 1968
	11	Debbie Slimmon	21 – 3 April 1967
	12	Marina Moffa	24 – 17 April 1964
	13	Karen Dalton	27 – 2 January 1961
	14	Shelley Sandie	19 – 22 January 1969
	15	Maree White	28 – 7 June 1960

Head coach

Robbie Cadee

Legend

- Club – describes last
  club before the tournament
- Age – describes age
  on 17 September 1988

Group play

Pos	Team	Pld	W	L	PF	PA	PD	Pts	Qualification
1	Australia	3	2	1	178	196	−18	5 (Note: Head-to-head record: Australia 1–0 Soviet Union)	Semifinals
2	Soviet Union	3	2	1	208	188	+20	5	Semifinals
3	Bulgaria	3	1	2	217	241	−24	4 (Note: Head-to-head record: Bulgaria 1–0 South Korea)	Classification round
4	South Korea (H)	3	1	2	244	222	+22	4	Classification round

Source: FIBA
Rules for classification: 1) points; 2) head-to-head points; 3) head-to-head goal average; 4) head-to-head number of points scored.
(H) Hosts
Notes:

19 September 1988
19:30

Boxscore

Australia	55–91	South Korea
Scoring by half: 20–41, 35–50
Pts: Gorman 11; Rebs: Gorman 8 Asts: Maher, Timms 3		Pts: Lee KJ 19; Rebs: Choi, Kim HS 4 Asts: Lee HS, Sung 2

Jamsil Gymnasium, Seoul

22 September 1988
19:30

Boxscore

Australia	63–57	Bulgaria
Scoring by half: 31–30, 32–27
Pts: Maher 20; Rebs: Maher 9 Asts: Timms 3		Pts: Slavcheva 15; Rebs: Slavcheva 6 Asts: Slavcheva 2

Jamsil Gymnasium, Seoul

25 September 1988
21:30

Boxscore

Australia	60–48	Soviet Union
Scoring by half: 30–30, 30–18
Pts: Maher 20; Rebs: Maher 8 Asts: Maher 6		Pts: Yakovleva 13; Rebs: 4 players 4 Asts: Minkh 2

Jamsil Gymnasium, Seoul

Semifinals

27 September 1988
9:45

Boxscore

Australia	56–57	Yugoslavia
Scoring by half: 30–32, 26–25
Pts: Timms 19; Rebs: Dalton 8 Asts: Dalton, Maher 2		Pts: Mujanović 20; Rebs: Dornik, Mujanović, Nakić 4 Asts: Vangelovska 2

Jamsil Gymnasium, Seoul

Bronze medal match

28 September 1988
21:30

Boxscore

Australia	53–68	Soviet Union
Scoring by half: 21–32, 32–36
Pts: Maher 22; Rebs: Maher, Timms 3 Asts: Maher 4		Pts: Savitskaya 16; Rebs: Yakovleva 7 Asts: Buryakina 2

Jamsil Gymnasium, Seoul

== Cycling ==
Seventeen cyclists, thirteen men and four women, represented Australia in 1988.

Men's road race

- Edward Salas
- Stephen Fairless
- Scott Steward

Men's team time trial

- Stephen Fairless
- Bruce Keech
- Clayton Stevenson
- Scott Steward

Men's sprint

- Gary Neiwand

Men's 1 km time trial

- Martin Vinnicombe

Men's individual pursuit

- Dean Woods

Men's team pursuit

- Brett Dutton
- Wayne McCarney
- Stephen McGlede
- Dean Woods
- Scott McGrory

Men's points race

- Robert Burns

Women's road race

- Elizabeth Hepple – 2:00:52 (→ 22nd place)
- Donna Gould – 2:00:52 (→ 27th place)
- Kathleen Shannon – 2:00:52 (→ 29th place)

Women's sprint

- Julie Speight

== Diving ==
Men

Athlete	Event	Preliminary		Final	
Athlete	Event	Points	Rank	Points	Rank
Graeme Banks	3 m springboard	499.41	23	Did not advance	
Russell Butler	3 m springboard	470.19	28	Did not advance	
Graeme Banks	10 m platform	462.87	19	Did not advance	
Craig Rogerson	10 m platform	469.47	18	Did not advance	

Women

Athlete	Event	Preliminary		Final	
Athlete	Event	Points	Rank	Points	Rank
Jennifer Donnet	3 m springboard	433.17	11 Q	432.81	10
Julie Kent	10 m platform	339.96	14	Did not advance	

== Fencing ==
Two fencers, one man and one woman, represented Australia in 1988.

Men's foil

- Robert Davidson

Men's épée

- Robert Davidson

Women's foil

- Andrea Chaplin

== Hockey ==
=== Men's team competition ===
- Preliminary round (Group A)
  - Australia – Kenya 7–1
  - Australia – Argentina 4–0
  - Australia – Netherlands 3–2
  - Australia – Pakistan 4–0
  - Australia – Spain 1–0
- Semi-finals
  - Australia – Great Britain 2–3
- Bronze Medal Game
  - Australia – Netherlands 1–2 (→ Fourth place)
- Team Roster
  - ( 1.) Craig Davies (captain)
  - ( 2.) Colin Batch
  - ( 3.) John Bestall
  - ( 4.) Warren Birmingham
  - ( 5.) Ric Charlesworth
  - ( 6.) Andrew Deane
  - ( 7.) Michael York
  - ( 8.) Mark Hager
  - ( 9.) Jay Stacy
  - (10.) Neil Hawgood
  - (11.) Peter Noel (goalkeeper)
  - (12.) Graham Reid
  - (13.) Roger Smith
  - (14.) Neil Snowden (goalkeeper)
  - (15.) David Wansbrough
  - (16.) Ken Wark
- Head coach: Richard Aggiss

=== Women's team competition ===
- Preliminary round (Group B)
  - Australia – Canada 1–1
  - Australia – West Germany 1–0
  - Australia – South Korea 5–5
- Semi-finals
  - Australia – The Netherlands 3–2
- Final
  - Australia – South Korea 2–0 (→ Gold Medal)
- Team Roster
  - ( 1.) Kathleen Partridge (goalkeeper)
  - ( 2.) Elsbeth Clement
  - ( 3.) Liane Tooth
  - ( 4.) Loretta Dorman
  - ( 5.) Lorraine Hillas
  - ( 6.) Michelle Capes
  - ( 7.) Sandra Pisani
  - ( 8.) Deborah Bowman (captain)
  - ( 9.) Lee Capes
  - (10.) Kim Small
  - (11.) Sally Carbon
  - (12.) Jackie Pereira
  - (13.) Tracey Belbin
  - (14.) Rechelle Hawkes
  - (15.) Sharon Buchanan
  - (16.) Maree Fish (goalkeeper)
- Head coach: Brian Glencross

== Modern pentathlon ==
One male pentathlete represented Australia in 1988.

Men's Individual Competition:

- Alexander Watson – 0 pt, 64th place

Men's team competition:

- Watson – 0 pt, 64th place

== Rowing ==
- Ion Popa

== Swimming ==
Men's 50 m Freestyle

- Andrew Baildon
  - Heat – 22.99
  - Final – 23.15 (→ 8th place)
- Tom Stachewicz
  - Heat – 23.72 (→ did not advance, 27th place)

Men's 100 m Freestyle

- Andrew Baildon
  - Heat – 50.34
  - Final – 50.23 (→ 6th place)
- Tom Stachewicz
  - Heat – 50.90
  - B-Final – 50.71 (→ 9th place)

Men's 200 m Freestyle

- Duncan Armstrong
  - Heat – 1:48.86
  - Final – 1:47.25 (→ Gold Medal)
- Tom Stachewicz
  - Heat – 1:51.02
  - B-Final – 1:50.83 (→ 11th place)

Men's 400 m Freestyle

- Duncan Armstrong
  - Heat – 3:50.64
  - Final – 3:47.15 (→ Silver Medal)
- Ian Brown
  - Heat – 3:51.09
  - B-Final – 3:54.63 (→ 13th place)

Men's 1500 m Freestyle

- Michael Bruce McKenzie
  - Heat – 15:19.36 (→ did not advance, 11th place)
- Jason Plummer
  - Heat – 15:22.85 (→ did not advance, 14th place)

Men's 100 m Backstroke

- Carl Wilson
  - Heat – 58.40 (→ did not advance, 27th place)
- Simon Upton
  - Heat – 59.06 (→ did not advance, 32nd place)

Men's 200 m Backstroke

- Simon Upton
  - Heat – 2:05.08 (→ did not advance, 22nd place)

Men's 100 m Breaststroke

- Ian McAdam
  - Heat – 1:04.56 (→ did not advance, 22nd place)

Men's 200 m Breaststroke

- Ian McAdam
  - Heat – 2:19.68 (→ did not advance, 21st place)

Men's 100 m Butterfly

- Jon Sieben
  - Heat – 53.85
  - Final – 53.33 (→ 4th place)
- David Wilson
  - Heat – 55.54 (→ did not advance, 20th place)

Men's 200 m Butterfly

- David Wilson
  - Heat – 1:59.02
  - Final – 1:59.20 (→ 6th place)
- Martin Roberts
  - Heat – 2:00.32
  - B-Final – 2:04.28 (→ 16th place)

Men's 200 m Individual Medley

- Robert Bruce
  - Heat – 2:04.31
  - Final – 2:04.34 (→ 6th place)
- Rob Woodhouse
  - Heat 8 – 2:05.87 (→ did not advance, 17th place)

Men's 400 m Individual Medley

- Robert Bruce
  - Heat – 4:25.15
  - B-Final – 4:24.33 (→ 11th place)
- Rob Woodhouse
  - Heat 5 – 4:25.60
  - B-Final – 4:26.14 (→ 14th place)

Men's 4 × 200 m Freestyle Relay

- Jason Plummer, Ian Brown, Martin Roberts, and Tom Stachewicz
  - Heat – 7:21.46
- Tom Stachewicz, Ian Brown, Jason Plummer, and Duncan Armstrong
  - Final – 7:15.23 (→ 4th place)

Men's 4 × 100 m Medley Relay

- Carl Wilson, Ian McAdam, Jon Sieben, and Andrew Baildon
  - Heat – 3:47.40
  - Final – 3:45.85 (→ 6th place)

Women's 50 m Freestyle

- Karen van Wirdum
  - Heat – 26.12
  - Final – 26.01 (→ 8th place)

Women's 100 m Freestyle

- Karen van Wirdum
  - Heat – 56.84
  - B-Final – 57.04 (→ 14th place)
- Susanne Baumer
  - Heat – 57.76 (→ did not advance, 22nd place)

Women's 200 m Freestyle

- Sheridan Burge-Lopez
  - Heat – 2:03.42 (→ did not advance, 20th place)
- Susanne Baumer
  - Heat – 2:04.82 (→ did not advance, 26th place)

Women's 400 m Freestyle

- Janelle Elford
  - Heat – 4:11.07
  - Final – 4:10.64 (→ 5th place)
- Sheridan Burge-Lopez
  - Heat – 4:12.77
  - B-Final – 4:10.21 (→ 9th place)

Women's 800 m Freestyle

- Julie McDonald
  - Heat – 8:29.68
  - Final – 8:22.93 (→ Bronze Medal)
- Janelle Elford
  - Heat – 8:32.14
  - B-Final – 8:30.94 (→ 6th place)

Women's 100 m Backstroke

- Nicole Livingstone
  - Heat – 1:03.26
  - Final – 1:04.15 (→ 7th place)
- Karen Lord
  - Heat – 1:04.69 (→ did not advance, 16th place)

Women's 200 m Backstroke

- Nicole Livingstone
  - Heat – 2:14.81
  - Final – 2:13.43 (→ 5th place)
- Karen Lord
  - Heat – 2:16.94 (→ did not advance, 16th place)
  - B-Final – 2:18.78 (→ 14th place)

Women's 100 m Breaststroke

- Lara Hooiveld
  - Heat – 1:11.40
  - B-Final – 1:11.26 (→ 15th place)

Women's 200 m Breaststroke

- Lara Hooiveld
  - Heat – 2:39.97 (→ did not advance, 30th place)

Women's 100 m Butterfly

- Fiona Alessandri
  - Heat – 1:01.90
  - B-Final – 1:02.51 (→ 13th place)

Women's 200 m Butterfly

- Donna Procter
  - Heat – 2:18.17 (→ did not advance, 17th place)

Women's 200 m Individual Medley

- Jodie Clatworthy
  - Heat – 2:17.29
  - Final – 2:16.31 (→ 4th place)
- Donna Procter
  - Heat – 2:21.79 (→ 19th place)

Women's 400 m Individual Medley

- Jodie Clatworthy
  - Heat – 4:44.26
  - Final – 4:45.86 (→ 6th place)
- Donna Procter
  - Heat – 4:47.57
  - Final – 4:47.51 (→ 8th place)

Women's 4 × 100 m Medley Relay

- Nicole Livingstone, Lara Hooiveld, Fiona Alessandri and Karen van Wirdum
  - Heat – 4:14.32
  - Final – 4:11.57 (→ 4th place)

== Synchronized swimming ==
Two synchronized swimmers represented Australia in 1988.

Women's solo

- Lisa Lieschke
- Semon Rohloff

Women's duet

- Lisa Lieschke
- Semon Rohloff

== Tennis ==
Men's Singles Competition

- John Fitzgerald
  - First round – Lost to Grant Connell (Canada) 6-6 6-4 2-6 2-6
- Wally Masur
  - First round – Defeated Luiz Mattar (Brazil) 6-4 6-4 4-6 6-7 6-4
  - Second round – Lost to Carl-Uwe Steeb (West Germany) 3-6 7-5 3-6 6-1 5-7

Men's Doubles Competition

- Darren Cahill and John Fitzgerald
  - First round – Defeated Anastasios Bavelas and George Kalovelonis (Greece) 6-2 4-6 6-1 6-1
  - Second round – Defeated Bruce Derlin and Kelly Evernden (New Zealand) 6-7 6-4 6-2 3-6 6-1
  - Quarterfinals – Lost to Stefan Edberg and Anders Järryd (Sweden) 3-6 4-6 3-6

Women's Singles Competition

- Anne Minter
  - First round – Defeated Xochitl Escobedo (Mexico) 6-1 6-3
  - Second round – Lost to Natasha Zvereva (Soviet Union) 4-6 6-3 1-6
- Elizabeth Smylie
  - First round – Lost to Raffaella Reggi (Italy) 6-7 0-6
- Wendy Turnbull
  - First round – Defeated Clare Wood (Great Britain) 6-1 6-3
  - Second round – Lost to Natasha Zvereva (Soviet Union) 4-6 6-3 1-6

== Water polo ==
Men's team competition

- Preliminary round (Group A)
  - Lost to West Germany (11-13)
  - Lost to Soviet Union (4-11)
  - Lost to Italy (5-7)
  - Defeated France (7-6)
  - Defeated South Korea (13-2)
- Classification Round (Group D)
  - Defeated Spain (8-7)
  - Lost to Hungary (5-13) → 8th place
- Team Roster
  - Glenn Townsend
  - Richard Pengelley
  - Christopher Harrison
  - Troy Stockwell
  - Andrew Wightman
  - Andrew Kerr
  - Raymond Mayers
  - Geoffrey Clark
  - John Fox
  - Christopher Wybrow
  - Simon Asher
  - Andrew Taylor
  - Donald Cameron
- Head coach: Tom Hoad

== See also ==
- Australia at the 1986 Commonwealth Games
- Australia at the 1990 Commonwealth Games
