= List of Commonwealth Games medallists in synchronised swimming =

This is the complete list of Commonwealth Games medallists in synchronised swimming from 1986 to 2010.

== Solo ==
Games	Gold		Silver		Bronze	
1986	Sylvie Fréchette (CAN)	199.5	Jackie Dodd (ENG)	188.05	Katie Sadleir (NZL)	175.08
1990	Sylvie Fréchette (CAN)	196.68	Kerry Shacklock (ENG)	184.79	Semon Rohloff (AUS)	173.320
1994	Lisa Alexander (CAN)	189.4835	Kerry Shacklock (ENG)	183.9717	Celeste Ferraris (AUS)	172.6626
1998	Valérie Hould-Marchand (CAN)	93.64	Naomi Young (AUS)	90.933	Gayle Adamson (ENG)	
2002	Claire Carver-Dias (CAN)	93.834	Gayle Adamson (ENG)	87.917	Naomi Young (AUS)	85.834
2006	Marie-Pier Boudreau Gagnon (CAN)	93.833	Jenna Randall (ENG)	85.334	Irena Olevsky (AUS)	83.833
2010	Marie-Pier Boudreau Gagnon (CAN)		Jenna Randall (ENG)		Lauren Smith (SCO)	

== Duet ==
Games	Gold		Silver		Bronze	
1986	Michelle Cameron & Carolyn Waldo (CAN)	199.54	Jackie Dodd & Nicola Shearn (ENG)	186.59	Lisa Lieschke & Donna Rankin (AUS)	173
1990	Kathy Glen & Christine Larsen (CAN)	191.23	Sarah Northey & Kerry Shacklock (ENG)	185.435	Lisa Lieschke & Semon Rohloff (AUS)	175.765
1994	Lisa Alexander & Erin Woodley (CAN)	188.0894	Kerry Shacklock & Laila Vakil (ENG)	182.6803	Monique Downes & Celeste Ferraris (AUS)	167.1646
1998	Kasia Kulesza & Jacinthe Taillon (CAN)	93.824	Irena Olevsky & Naomi Young (AUS)	91.077	Adele Carlsen & Katie Hooper (ENG)	87.13
2002	Claire Carver-Dias & Fanny Létourneau (CAN)	94.417	Gayle Adamson & Katie Hooper (ENG)	88.167	Ashleigh Rudder & Naomi Young (AUS)	85.917
2006	Marie-Pier Boudreau Gagnon & Isabelle Rampling (CAN)	92.500	Dannielle Liesch & Irena Olevsky (AUS)	84.000	Lisa Daniels & Nina Daniels (NZL)	83.667
2010	Marie-Pier Boudreau Gagnon & Chloé Isaac (CAN)		Olivia Allison & Jenna Randall (ENG)		Eloise Amberger & Sarah Bombell (AUS)	

== Figures ==
Games	Gold		Silver		Bronze	
1990	Sylvie Fréchette (CAN)	99.16	Kathy Glen (CAN)	94.74	Christine Larsen (CAN)	94.52
