= Synchronized swimming at the 1988 Summer Olympics – Women's solo =

Women's solo at the Games of the XXIV Olympiad
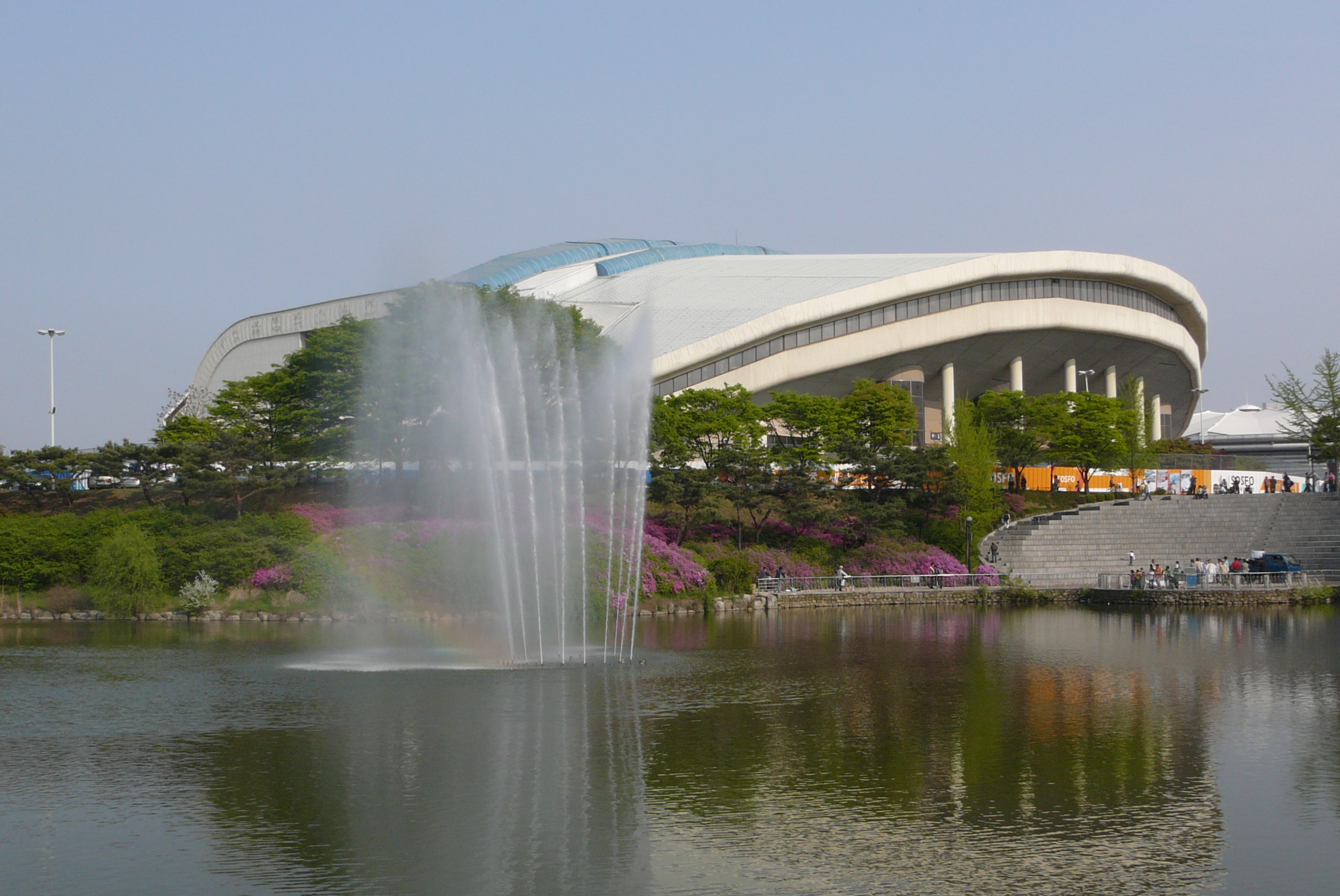
- Venue: Jamsil Indoor Swimming Pool
- Date: 26–30 September
- Competitors: 46 from 18 nations
- Winning points: 200.150

Medalists
1st place, gold medalist(s)		Carolyn Waldo	Canada
2nd place, silver medalist(s)		Tracie Ruiz	United States
3rd place, bronze medalist(s)		Mikako Kotani	Japan

The women's solo was one of two events in the Synchronised swimming program at the 1988 Summer Olympics. The final was held on 30 September 1988.

== Results ==
=== Technical figures ===
Rank	Country	Athlete	Technical
1	Canada	Carolyn Waldo	101.150
2	United States	Tracie Ruiz	98.633
3	United States	Sarah Josephson	98.000
4	United States	Karen Josephson	97.367
5	Canada	Michelle Cameron	96.683
6	Japan	Mikako Kotani	94.250
7	France	Muriel Hermine	93.500
8	Canada	Karin Larsen	92.250
9	Japan	Miyako Tanaka	91.267
10	Switzerland	Karin Singer	90.600
11	Soviet Union	Tatyana Titova	89.333
12	France	Karine Schuler	89.050
13	Great Britain	Nicola Shearn	88.733
14	Japan	Megumi Ito	88.517
15	France	Anne Capron	88.133
16	Soviet Union	Mariya Chernyayeva	88.000
17	Switzerland	Edith Boss	87.300
18	Soviet Union	Christina Thalassinidou	87.050
19	West Germany	Gerlind Scheller	85.583
20	Sweden	Marie Jacobsson	84.800
21	Brazil	Érika MacDavid	84.733
21	Mexico	Sonia Cárdeñas	84.733
23	Mexico	Lourdes Candini	84.533
24	Switzerland	Claudia Peczinka	84.067
25	Great Britain	Lian Goodwin	83.817
26	Venezuela	María Elena Giusti	83.733
27	South Korea	Kim Mijinsu	83.650
28	China	Tan Min	83.600
29	Mexico	Susana Candini	83.067
30	Brazil	Paula Carvalho	82.517
31	Brazil	Eva Riera	82.117
32	West Germany	Heike Friedrich	82.000
33	China	Luo Xi	81.883
34	China	Zhang Ying	81.150
35	South Korea	Ha Soo-kyung	80.750
36	Australia	Lisa Lieschke	80.433
36	West Germany	Doris Eisenhofer	80.433
38	South Korea	Choi Jeong-yun	79.150
39	Spain	Eva López	78.983
40	Australia	Semon Rohloff	78.850
41	Belgium	Patricia Serneels	78.750
42	Spain	Nuria Ayala	75.967
43	Aruba	Yvette Thuis	74.266
44	Spain	Marta Amorós	74.100
45	Aruba	Roswitha Lopez	70.483
—	Great Britain	Joanne Seeburg	DNF

=== Qualification ===
Rank	Country	Athlete	Technical	Free	Total
1	Canada	Carolyn Waldo	101.150	98.20	199.350
2	United States	Tracie Ruiz	98.633	98.40	197.033
3	Japan	Mikako Kotani	94.250	97.00	191.250
4	France	Muriel Hermine	93.500	95.60	189.100
5	Switzerland	Karin Singer	90.600	94.40	185.000
6	Great Britain	Nicola Shearn	88.733	92.60	181.333
7	Soviet Union	Christina Thalassinidou	87.050	93.60	180.650
8	West Germany	Gerlind Scheller	85.583	88.60	174.183
9	Sweden	Marie Jacobsson	84.800	88.00	172.800
10	Mexico	Lourdes Candini	84.533	88.00	172.533
11	China	Zhang Ying	81.150	89.60	170.750
12	South Korea	Ha Soo-kyung	80.750	89.20	169.950
13	Venezuela	María Elena Giusti	83.733	85.60	169.333
14	Spain	Eva López	78.983	88.40	167.383
15	Brazil	Paula Carvalho	82.517	83.80	166.317
16	Australia	Lisa Lieschke	80.433	85.20	165.633
17	Belgium	Patricia Serneels	78.750	85.80	164.550
18	Aruba	Roswitha Lopez	70.483	80.20	150.683

== Final ==
Rank	Country	Athlete	Technical	Free	Total
1st place, gold medalist(s)	Canada	Carolyn Waldo	101.150	99.00	200.150
2nd place, silver medalist(s)	United States	Tracie Ruiz	98.633	99.00	197.633
3rd place, bronze medalist(s)	Japan	Mikako Kotani	94.250	97.60	191.850
4	France	Muriel Hermine	93.500	96.60	190.100
5	Switzerland	Karin Singer	90.600	95.00	185.600
6	Great Britain	Nicola Shearn	88.733	93.20	181.933
7	Soviet Union	Christina Thalassinidou	87.050	93.60	180.650
8	West Germany	Gerlind Scheller	85.583	90.40	175.983
