= Synchronized swimming at the 1992 Summer Olympics – Women's solo =

Women's solo at the Games of the XXV Olympiad
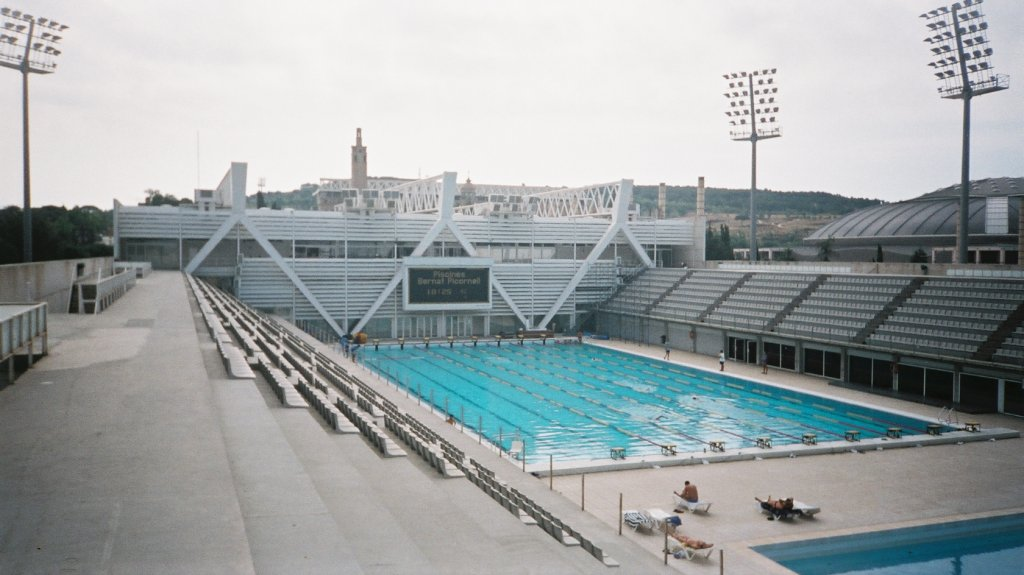
- Bernat Picornell Pools
- Venue: Piscines Bernat Picornell
- Date: 2 to 6 August
- Competitors: 53 from 22 nations
- Winning points: 191.848

Medalists
1st place, gold medalist(s)		Kristen Babb-Sprague	United States
1st place, gold medalist(s)		Sylvie Fréchette	Canada
3rd place, bronze medalist(s)		Fumiko Okuno	Japan

The women's solo was one of two events in the synchronized swimming program at the 1992 Summer Olympics. The finals was held on 6 August 1992.

Two gold medals were awarded in solo synchronized swimming after a judge inadvertently entered the score of "8.7" instead of the intended "9.7" in the computerized scoring system for one of Sylvie Fréchette's figures. This error ultimately placed Fréchette second, leaving Kristen Babb-Sprague for the gold medal. Following an appeal FINA awarded Fréchette a gold medal, replacing her silver medal and leaving the two swimmers both with gold.

This event was discontinued after these Olympics in favor of a team event.

== Results ==
=== Technical figures ===
Rank	Country	Athlete	Technical
1	United States	Kristen Babb-Sprague	92.808
2	United States	Sarah Josephson	92.587
3	United States	Karen Josephson	92.564
4	Canada	Sylvie Fréchette	92.557
5	Canada	Vicky Vilagos	91.175
6	Canada	Penny Vilagos	89.534
7	Japan	Fumiko Okuno	89.016
8	Japan	Mikako Kotani	88.590
9	Unified Team	Olga Sedakova	88.346
10	Japan	Aki Takayama	87.920
11	Unified Team	Yelena Dolzhenko	87.590
12	Great Britain	Kerry Shacklock	86.799
13	France	Anne Capron	86.689
14	Unified Team	Anna Kozlova	86.540
15	Greece	Christina Thalassinidou	85.884
16	Netherlands	Marjolijn Both	85.834
17	France	Karine Schuler	85.731
18	France	Marianne Aeschbacher	85.702
19	China	Tan Min	85.257
20	Netherlands	Tamara Zwart	85.016
21	Mexico	Sonia Cárdeñas	84.976
22	Venezuela	María Elena Giusti	84.973
23	China	Guan Zewen	84.775
24	China	Wang Xiaojie	84.752
25	Switzerland	Claudia Peczinka	84.581
26	Mexico	Elizabeth Cervantes	84.538
27	Great Britain	Natasha Haynes	84.495
28	Spain	Eva López	84.379
29	Germany	Monika Müller	84.147
30	Great Britain	Laila Vakil	83.934
31	Spain	Marta Amorós	83.907
32	Switzerland	Rahel Hobi	83.723
33	Italy	Paola Celli	83.610
34	Netherlands	Frouke van Beek	83.495
35	Brazil	Gláucia Soutinho	83.383
36	Austria	Christine Müllner	83.207
37	Mexico	Lourdes Olivera	82.686
38	Italy	Giovanna Burlando	82.525
39	Brazil	Fernanda Veirano	82.396
40	Austria	Beatrix Müllner	82.363
41	Australia	Celeste Ferraris	82.330
42	Switzerland	Caroline Imoberdorf	82.043
43	Spain	Nuria Ayala	81.946
44	Australia	Semon Rohloff	81.769
45	Finland	Liisa Laurila	81.765
46	Czechoslovakia	Lucie Svrčinová	80.755
47	Germany	Margit Schreib	80.594
48	Brazil	Cristiana Lobo	79.906
49	South Africa	Amanda Taylor	75.821
50	South Africa	Loren Wulfsohn	72.633
51	Independent Olympic Participants	Marija Senica	68.072
52	Independent Olympic Participants	Maja Kos	67.174
53	Independent Olympic Participants	Vanja Mičeta	64.865

=== Qualification ===
Rank	Country	Athlete	Free	Technical	Total
1	United States	Kristen Babb-Sprague	98.52	92.808	191.328
2	Canada	Sylvie Fréchette	98.52	92.557	191.077
3	Japan	Fumiko Okuno	97.56	89.016	186.576
4	Unified Team	Olga Sedakova	96.52	88.346	184.866
5	France	Anne Capron	94.80	86.689	181.489
6	Greece	Christina Thalassinidou	93.88	85.884	179.764
7	Great Britain	Kerry Shacklock	92.20	86.799	178.999
8	Netherlands	Marjolijn Both	93.08	85.834	178.914
9	Venezuela	María Elena Giusti	93.84	84.973	178.813
10	China	Tan Min	93.20	85.257	178.457
11	Mexico	Sonia Cárdeñas	93.36	84.976	178.336
12	Italy	Paola Celli	92.64	83.610	176.250
13	Spain	Eva López	91.72	84.379	176.099
14	Germany	Monika Müller	90.20	84.147	174.347
15	Switzerland	Claudia Peczinka	89.76	84.581	174.341
16	Brazil	Gláucia Soutinho	89.68	83.383	173.063
17	Austria	Beatrix Müllner	90.24	82.363	172.603
18	Australia	Semon Rohloff	90.20	81.769	171.969
19	Finland	Liisa Laurila	88.12	81.765	169.885
20	Czechoslovakia	Lucie Svrčinová	86.64	80.755	167.395
21	Independent Olympic Participants	Marija Senica	79.08	68.072	147.152

=== Final ===
Rank	Country	Athlete	Free	Technical	Total
1st place, gold medalist(s)	United States	Kristen Babb-Sprague	99.04	92.808	191.848
1st place, gold medalist(s)	Canada	Sylvie Fréchette	99.16	92.557	191.717
3rd place, bronze medalist(s)	Japan	Fumiko Okuno	98.04	89.016	187.056
4	Unified Team	Olga Sedakova	96.76	88.346	185.106
5	France	Anne Capron	95.76	86.689	182.449
6	Greece	Christina Thalassinidou	94.36	85.884	180.244
7	Great Britain	Kerry Shacklock	93.04	86.799	179.839
8	Netherlands	Marjolijn Both	93.52	85.834	179.354
