= Synchronized swimming at the 1988 Summer Olympics – Women's duet =

Women's duet at the Games of the XXIV Olympiad
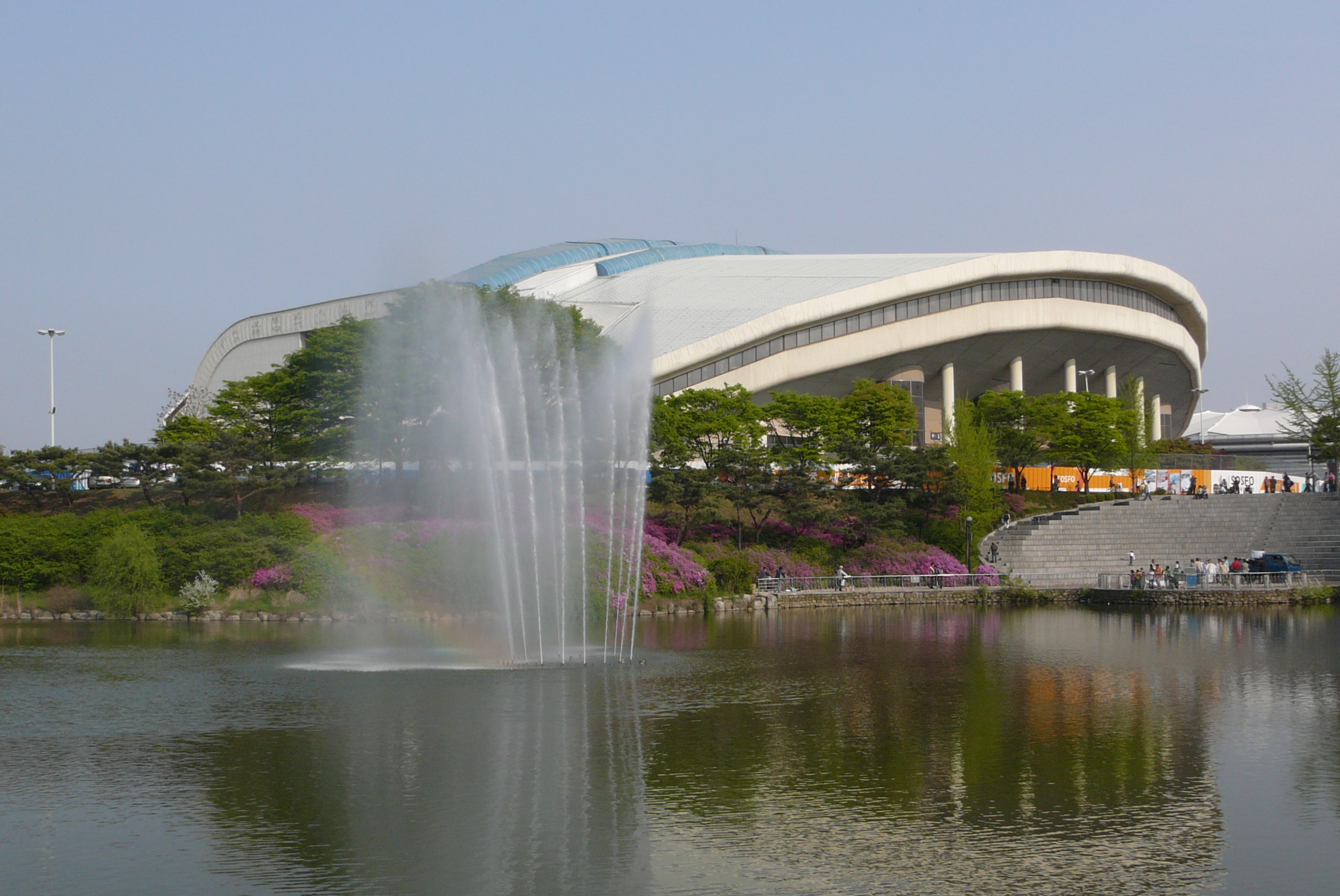
- Venue: Jamsil Indoor Swimming Pool
- Date: 27 September – 1 October
- Competitors: 30 from 15 nations
- Winning points: 197.717

Medalists
| 1st place, gold medalist(s) | | Michelle Cameron; Carolyn Waldo | Canada |
| 2nd place, silver medalist(s) | | Sarah Josephson; Karen Josephson | United States |
| 3rd place, bronze medalist(s) | | Miyako Tanaka; Mikako Kotani | Japan |

The women's duet was one of two events in the synchronised swimming program at the 1988 Summer Olympics. The final was held on 1 October.

== Results ==
=== Technical figures ===
| Rank | Country | Athlete | Technical | Rank | Average |
|---|---|---|---|---|---|
| 1 | Canada | Michelle Cameron | 96.683 | 5 | 98.917 |
| 1 | Canada | Carolyn Waldo | 101.150 | 1 | 98.917 |
| 2 | United States | Sarah Josephson | 98.000 | 3 | 97.684 |
| 2 | United States | Karen Josephson | 97.367 | 4 | 97.684 |
| 3 | Japan | Miyako Tanaka | 91.267 | 9 | 92.759 |
| 3 | Japan | Mikako Kotani | 94.250 | 6 | 92.759 |
| 4 | Switzerland | Edith Boss | 87.300 | 17 | 88.950 |
| 4 | Switzerland | Karin Singer | 90.600 | 10 | 88.950 |
| 5 | Soviet Union | Mariya Chernyayeva | 88.000 | 16 | 88.667 |
| 5 | Soviet Union | Tatyana Titova | 89.333 | 11 | 88.667 |
| 6 | France | Karine Schuler | 89.050 | 12 | 88.592 |
| 6 | France | Anne Capron | 88.133 | 15 | 88.592 |
| 7 | Great Britain | Nicola Shearn | 88.733 | 13 | 86.275 |
| 7 | Great Britain | Lian Goodwin | 83.817 | 25 | 86.275 |
| 8 | Mexico | Susana Candini | 83.067 | 29 | 83.800 |
| 8 | Mexico | Lourdes Candini | 84.533 | 23 | 83.800 |
| 9 | West Germany | Heike Friedrich | 82.000 | 32 | 83.792 |
| 9 | West Germany | Gerlind Scheller | 85.583 | 19 | 83.792 |
| 10 | Brazil | Érika MacDavid | 84.733 | 21 | 83.425 |
| 10 | Brazil | Eva Riera | 82.117 | 31 | 83.425 |
| 11 | China | Tan Min | 83.600 | 28 | 82.742 |
| 11 | China | Luo Xi | 81.883 | 33 | 82.742 |
| 12 | South Korea | Kim Mijinsu | 83.650 | 27 | 82.200 |
| 12 | South Korea | Ha Soo-kyung | 80.750 | 35 | 82.200 |
| 13 | Australia | Lisa Lieschke | 80.433 | 36 | 79.642 |
| 13 | Australia | Semon Rohloff | 78.850 | 40 | 79.642 |
| 14 | Spain | Eva López | 78.983 | 39 | 77.475 |
| 14 | Spain | Nuria Ayala | 75.967 | 42 | 77.475 |
| 15 | Aruba | Yvette Thuis | 74.266 | 43 | 72.375 |
| 15 | Aruba | Roswitha Lopez | 70.483 | 45 | 72.375 |

=== Qualification ===
| Rank | Country | Athlete | Technical | Free | Total |
|---|---|---|---|---|---|
| 1 | Canada | Michelle Cameron & Carolyn Waldo | 98.917 | 98.40 | 197.317 |
| 2 | United States | Sarah Josephson & Karen Josephson | 97.684 | 98.60 | 196.284 |
| 3 | Japan | Miyako Tanaka & Mikako Kotani | 92.759 | 96.80 | 189.559 |
| 4 | France | Karine Schuler & Anne Capron | 88.592 | 95.20 | 183.792 |
| 5 | Switzerland | Edith Boss & Karin Singer | 88.950 | 94.20 | 183.150 |
| 6 | Soviet Union | Mariya Chernyayeva & Tatyana Titova | 88.667 | 93.60 | 182.267 |
| 7 | Great Britain | Nicola Shearn & Lian Goodwin | 86.275 | 91.60 | 177.875 |
| 8 | Mexico | Susana Candini & Lourdes Candini | 83.800 | 91.20 | 175.000 |
| 9 | China | Tan Min & Luo Xi | 82.742 | 91.00 | 173.742 |
| 10 | West Germany | Heike Friedrich & Gerlind Scheller | 83.792 | 88.80 | 172.592 |
| 11 | South Korea | Kim Mijinsu & Ha Soo-kyung | 82.200 | 89.60 | 171.800 |
| 12 | Brazil | Érika MacDavid & Eva Riera | 83.425 | 87.60 | 171.025 |
| 13 | Australia | Lisa Lieschke & Semon Rohloff | 79.642 | 86.40 | 166.042 |
| 14 | Spain | Eva López & Nuria Ayala | 77.475 | 86.20 | 163.675 |
| 15 | Aruba | Yvette Thuis & Roswitha Lopez | 72.375 | 79.60 | 151.975 |

=== Final ===
| Rank | Country | Athlete | Technical | Free | Total |
|---|---|---|---|---|---|
| 1st place, gold medalist(s) | Canada | Michelle Cameron & Carolyn Waldo | 98.917 | 98.80 | 197.717 |
| 2nd place, silver medalist(s) | United States | Sarah Josephson & Karen Josephson | 97.684 | 99.60 | 197.284 |
| 3rd place, bronze medalist(s) | Japan | Miyako Tanaka & Mikako Kotani | 92.759 | 97.40 | 190.159 |
| 4 | France | Karine Schuler & Anne Capron | 88.592 | 96.20 | 184.792 |
| 5 | Switzerland | Edith Boss & Karin Singer | 88.950 | 95.00 | 183.950 |
| 6 | Soviet Union | Mariya Chernyayeva & Tatyana Titova | 88.667 | 94.00 | 182.667 |
| 7 | Great Britain | Nicola Shearn & Lian Goodwin | 86.275 | 92.80 | 179.075 |
| 8 | Mexico | Susana Candini & Lourdes Candini | 84.633 | 92.20 | 176.833 |
