= Synchronized swimming at the 1992 Summer Olympics – Women's duet =

Women's duet at the Games of the XXV Olympiad
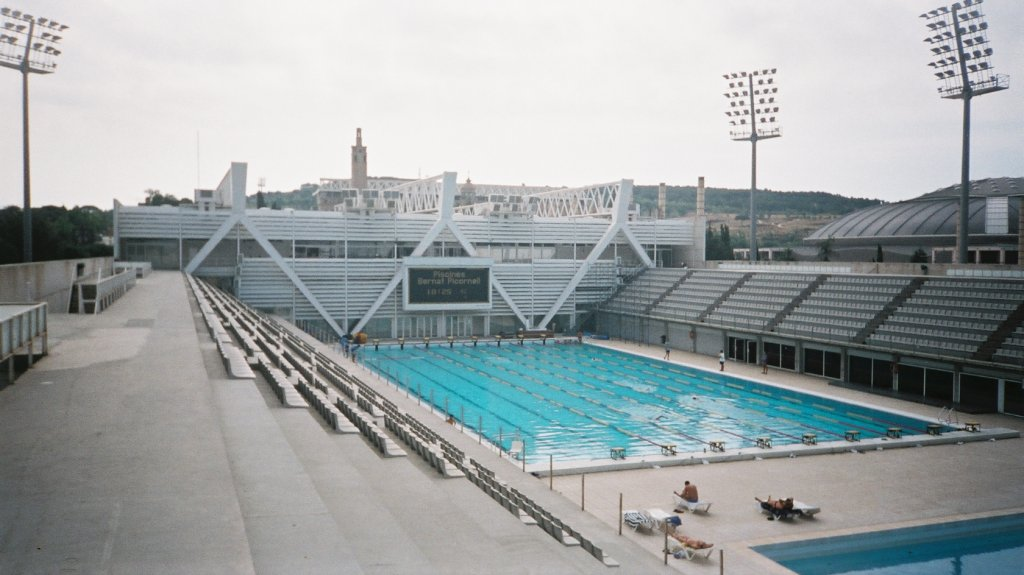
- Bernat Picornell Pools
- Venue: Piscines Bernat Picornell
- Date: 3–5 August
- Competitors: 36 from 18 nations
- Winning points: 192.175

Medalists
1st place, gold medalist(s)		Karen Josephson; Sarah Josephson	United States
2nd place, silver medalist(s)		Penny Vilagos; Vicky Vilagos	Canada
3rd place, bronze medalist(s)		Fumiko Okuno; Aki Takayama	Japan

The women's duet was one of two events in the synchronized swimming program at the 1992 Summer Olympics. The final was held on 7 August 1992.

The preliminary phase consisted of a technical routine and a free routine. The scores from the two routines were added together and the top 8 duets qualified for the final.

The final consisted of one free routine, the score from the final free routine was added to the score from the preliminary technical routine to decide the overall winners.

== Results ==
=== Qualification ===
Rank	Country	Athlete	Technical	Free	Total
1	United States	Karen Josephson & Sarah Josephson	92.575	98.64	191.215
2	Canada	Penny Vilagos & Vicky Vilagos	90.354	98.24	188.594
3	Japan	Fumiko Okuno & Aki Takayama	88.468	97.60	186.068
4	Unified Team	Anna Kozlova & Olga Sedakova	87.443	95.76	183.203
5	France	Marianne Aeschbacher & Anne Capron	86.195	95.20	181.395
6	Great Britain	Kerry Shacklock & Laila Vakil	85.366	92.88	178.246
7	Netherlands	Marjolijn Both & Tamara Zwart	85.425	92.56	177.985
8	China	Guan Zewen & Wang Xiaojie	84.763	92.80	177.563
9	Mexico	Sonia Cárdeñas & Lourdes Olivera	83.831	93.28	177.111
10	Italy	Giovanna Burlando & Paola Celli	83.067	93.24	176.307
11	Spain	Marta Amorós & Eva López	84.143	92.08	176.223
12	Switzerland	Caroline Imoberdorf & Claudia Peczinka	83.312	92.52	175.832
13	Austria	Beatrix Müllner & Christine Müllner	82.785	90.60	173.385
14	Germany	Monika Müller & Margit Schreib	82.370	89.80	172.170
15	Brazil	Fernanda Veirano & Cristiana Lobo	81.151	90.68	171.831
16	Australia	Celeste Ferraris & Semon Rohloff	82.049	88.88	170.929
17	South Africa	Amanda Taylor & Loren Wulfsohn	74.227	78.16	152.387
18	Independent Olympic Participants	Maja Kos & Vanja Mičeta	66.019	71.44	137.459

=== Final ===
Rank	Country	Athlete	Technical	Free	Total
1st place, gold medalist(s)	United States	Karen Josephson & Sarah Josephson	92.575	99.60	192.175
2nd place, silver medalist(s)	Canada	Penny Vilagos & Vicky Vilagos	90.354	99.04	189.394
3rd place, bronze medalist(s)	Japan	Fumiko Okuno & Aki Takayama	88.468	98.40	186.868
4	Unified Team	Anna Kozlova & Olga Sedakova	87.443	96.64	184.083
5	France	Marianne Aeschbacher & Anne Capron	86.195	95.60	181.795
6	Great Britain	Kerry Shacklock & Laila Vakil	85.366	94.00	179.366
7	Netherlands	Marjolijn Both & Tamara Zwart	85.425	93.92	179.345
8	China	Guan Zewen & Wang Xiaojie	84.763	93.08	177.843
