= Independent Olympic Participants at the 1992 Summer Olympics =

- Individuals competed under the Olympic Flag
- IOC code: IOP

in Barcelona
- Competitors: 58 (39 men and 19 women) in 13 sports
- Flag bearer: N/A (did not participate in Parade of Nations)
- Medals Ranked 44th: Gold 0 Silver 1 Bronze 2 Total 3

Summer Olympics appearances (overview)
- 1992; 1996; 2000; 2004–2008; 2012; 2016; 2020; 2024

Other related appearances
- Yugoslavia (1920–1992 W); North Macedonia (1996–pres.); Serbia and Montenegro (1996–2006); Serbia (1912, 2008–pres.); Montenegro (2008–pres.); Kosovo (2016–pres.)

During the 1992 Summer Olympics in Barcelona, Spain, athletes from the Federal Republic of Yugoslavia (FR Yugoslavia, comprising Serbia and Montenegro) and the Republic of Macedonia competed as independent Olympic participants. Macedonian athletes could not appear under their own flag because their National Olympic Committee (NOC) had not been formed. Due to FR Yugoslavia's conduct in the ongoing Yugoslav Wars, it was placed under sanctions by United Nations Security Council Resolution 757, which prevented the country from taking part in the Olympics. Individual Yugoslav athletes were allowed to take part as independent Olympic participants (and as Independent Paralympic participants at the 1992 Summer Paralympics).

58 competitors (52 from FR Yugoslavia, 6 from Republic of Macedonia), 39 men and 19 women, took part in 54 events in 13 sports. Three athletes won medals in 1992 as independent Olympic participants, all in shooting.

== Timeline of participation ==
Olympic Year/s	Teams			
1912	Kingdom of Serbia			
1920–1936	Kingdom of Yugoslavia			
1948–1992 W	Yugoslavia			
1992 S	Independent Olympic Participants			
1994				
1996–2006	Macedonia	FR Yugoslavia/ Serbia and Montenegro		
2008–2010	Macedonia	Serbia		Montenegro
2012–2014	Macedonia	Serbia		Montenegro
2016–2018	Macedonia	Serbia	Kosovo	Montenegro
2020–present	North Macedonia	Serbia	Kosovo	Montenegro

== Medalists ==
Medal	Name	Sport	Event	Date
Silver	Jasna Šekarić	Shooting	Women's 10 metre air pistol	1 August
Bronze	Aranka Binder	Shooting	Women's 10 metre air rifle	26 July
Bronze	Stevan Pletikosić	Shooting	Men's 50 metre rifle prone	29 July

== Competitors ==
The following is the list of number of competitors in the Games.

Sport	Men	Women	Total
Athletics	6	3	9
Canoeing	5	0	5
Cycling	5	0	5
Fencing	0	1	1
Gymnastics	0	2	2
Judo	3	1	4
Rowing	2	0	2
Shooting	3	5	8
Swimming	2	2	4
Synchronized swimming	–	3	3
Table tennis	3	2	5
Tennis	1	0	1
Wrestling	9	–	9
Total	39	19	58

== Athletics ==
Men's 200 metres

- (Federal Republic of Yugoslavia) Dejan Jovković

- Qualification — 21.77 (→ did not advance)

Men's 400 metres

- (Federal Republic of Yugoslavia) Slobodan Branković

- Qualification — 46.34
- Quarter-Finals — 45.90 (→ did not advance)

Men's 800 metres

- (Federal Republic of Yugoslavia) Slobodan Popović

- Qualification — 1:49.69 (→ did not advance)

Men's High Jump

- (Federal Republic of Yugoslavia) Dragutin Topić

- Qualification — 2.26 m
- Final — 2.28 m (→ 8th place)

- (Federal Republic of Yugoslavia) Stevan Zorić

- Qualification — 2.15 m (→ did not advance)

Men's Shot Put

- (Federal Republic of Yugoslavia) Dragan Perić

- Qualification — 20.24 m
- Final — 20.32 m (→ 7th place)

Women's 100 metres hurdles

- (North Macedonia) Elizabeta Pavlovska

- Qualifying Heat — 14.26 (→ did not advance)

Women's 10,000 metres

- (Federal Republic of Yugoslavia) Suzana Ćirić

- Qualifying Heat — 33:42.26 (→ did not advance)

Women's Long Jump

- (Federal Republic of Yugoslavia) Tamara Malešev

- Qualification — 6.35 m (→ did not advance)

== Canoeing ==
Men's Kayak Singles, 500 metres

- (Federal Republic of Yugoslavia) Žarko Vekić

- Qualifying Heat — 1:51.44
- Repechages - 1:55.32 (→ did not advance)

Men's Kayak Singles, 1,000 metres

- (Federal Republic of Yugoslavia) Srđan Marilović

- Qualifying Heat — 3:50.02
- Repechages - 3:45.52 (→ did not advance)

Men's Kayak Doubles, 1,000 metres

- (Federal Republic of Yugoslavia) Srđan Marilović and (Federal Republic of Yugoslavia) Žarko Vekić

- Qualifying Heat — 3:31.69
- Repechages - 3:38.17 (→ did not advance)

Men's Kayak Singles, Slalom

- (North Macedonia) Lazar Popovski
  - 123.82 (Run 1: 2:03.82, 0 points, Run 2: 2:05.72, 10 points, 34th place)
- (Federal Republic of Yugoslavia) Milan Đorđević
  - 156.28 (Run 1: DNF, 0 points, Run 2: 2:26.28, 10 points, 39th place)

Men's Canadian Singles, Slalom

- (North Macedonia) Lazo Miloević
  - 170.22 (Run 1: Did not finish, 55 points, Run 2: 2:35.22, 15 points, 31st place)

== Cycling ==
Five male cyclists competed as independent Olympic participants in 1992.

Men's road race

- (Federal Republic of Yugoslavia) Aleksandar Milenković — +0:35 (→ 42nd place)
- (Federal Republic of Yugoslavia) Radiša Čubrić — +9:53 (→ 78th place)
- (Federal Republic of Yugoslavia) Mikoš Rnjaković — Did not finish

Men's team time trial

- (Federal Republic of Yugoslavia) Mićo Brković, (Federal Republic of Yugoslavia) Aleksandar Milenković, (Federal Republic of Yugoslavia) Mikoš Rnjaković, (Federal Republic of Yugoslavia) Dušan Popeskov
  - 2:14:37 → 18th place

Men's points race

- (Federal Republic of Yugoslavia) Dušan Popeskov

- Round 1 — Did not finish

== Fencing ==
One female fencer competed as an independent Olympic participant in 1992.

Women's foil

- (Federal Republic of Yugoslavia) Tamara Savić-Šotra → 31st place

== Judo ==
Men's Lightweight

- (Federal Republic of Yugoslavia) Miroslav Jočić

Men's Half-Heavyweight

- (Federal Republic of Yugoslavia) Dano Pantić

Men's Heavyweight

- (Federal Republic of Yugoslavia) Mitar Milinković

Women's Extra-Lightweight

- (Federal Republic of Yugoslavia) Leposava Marković

== Rhythmic gymnastics ==
Women's Individual

- (Federal Republic of Yugoslavia) Majda Milak

- Qualification — 35.675 points (Hoop - 9.100 points, Rope - 9.000 points, Clubs - 8.600 points, Ball - 8.975 points) (32nd overall, did not advance)

- (Federal Republic of Yugoslavia) Kristina Radonjić

- Qualification — 35.600 points (Hoop - 9.000 points, Rope - 8.700 points, Clubs - 8.800 points, Ball - 9.100 points) (33rd overall, did not advance)

== Rowing ==
Men's Coxless Pairs

- (Federal Republic of Yugoslavia) Vladimir Banjanac and (Federal Republic of Yugoslavia) Lazo Pivač

- Heat: 7:08.35 (5th in heat 1, advanced to repechage)
- Repechage: 6:54.76 (3rd in repechage, advanced to final C)
- Final C: 6:44.52 (2nd in final C, 14th overall)

== Shooting ==
Men's 10m Air Rifle

- (Federal Republic of Yugoslavia) Goran Maksimović

- Qualification: 592 points (2nd overall, Qualified)
- Final: 98.6 points (Total: 690.6) → 5th place

- (Federal Republic of Yugoslavia) Nemanja Mirosavljev

- Qualification: 587 points (18th overall, did not advance)

Men's 50m Rifle Prone

- (Federal Republic of Yugoslavia) Stevan Pletikosić

- Qualification: 597 points (3rd overall, Qualified)
- Final: 104.1 points (Total: 701.1) → Bronze Medal

- (Federal Republic of Yugoslavia) Goran Maksimović

- Qualification: 591 points (31st overall, did not advance)

Men's 50m Rifle 3 Positions

- (Federal Republic of Yugoslavia) Nemanja Mirosavljev

- Qualification: 1163 points (Prone: 397 points, Standing: 374 points, Kneeling: 392 points) (9th overall, did not advance)

- (Federal Republic of Yugoslavia) Goran Maksimović

- Qualification: 1158 points (Prone: 396 points, Standing: 379 points, Kneeling: 383 points) (17th overall, did not advance)

Women's 10m Air Rifle

- (Federal Republic of Yugoslavia) Aranka Binder

- Qualification: 393 points (5th overall, Qualified)
- Final: 102.1 points (Total: 495.1) → Bronze Medal

- (Federal Republic of Yugoslavia) Lidija Mihajlović

- Qualification: 389 points (17th overall, did not advance)

Women's 50m Rifle 3 Positions

- (Federal Republic of Yugoslavia) Aleksandra Ivošev

- Qualification: 577 points (Prone: 198 points, Standing: 198 points, Kneeling: 190 points) (14th overall, did not advance)

- (Federal Republic of Yugoslavia) Lidija Mihajlović

- Qualification: 565 points (Prone: 192 points, Standing: 182 points, Kneeling: 191 points) (33rd overall, did not advance)

Women's 10m Air Pistol

- (Federal Republic of Yugoslavia) Jasna Šekarić

- Qualification: 389 points (1st overall, Qualified)
- Final: 97.4 points (Total: 486.4) → Silver Medal

- (Federal Republic of Yugoslavia) Eszter Poljak

- Qualification: 369 points (42nd overall, did not advance)

Women's 25m Pistol

- (Federal Republic of Yugoslavia) Jasna Šekarić

- Qualification: 583 points (5th overall, Qualified)
- Final: 93 points (Total: 676) → 6th

== Swimming ==
Men's 50 metre freestyle

- (Federal Republic of Yugoslavia) Mladen Kapor

- Qualifying Heat — 23.42 (→ did not advance)

Men's 100 metre freestyle

- (Federal Republic of Yugoslavia) Mladen Kapor

- Qualifying Heat — 51.44 (→ did not advance)

Men's 100 metre butterfly

- (North Macedonia) Kire Filipovski

- Qualifying Heat — 56.68 (→ did not advance)

Men's 200 metre butterfly

- (North Macedonia) Kire Filipovski

- Qualifying Heat — 2:08.71 (→ did not advance)

Women's 100 metre backstroke

- (Federal Republic of Yugoslavia) Darija Alauf

- Qualifying Heat — 1:06.81 (→ did not advance)

Women's 200 metre backstroke

- (Federal Republic of Yugoslavia) Darija Alauf

- Qualifying Heat — 2:22.07 (→ did not advance)

Women's 100 metre butterfly

- (North Macedonia) Nataša Meškovska

- Qualifying Heat — 1:04.16 (→ did not advance)

Women's 200 metre butterfly

- (North Macedonia) Nataša Meškovska

- Qualifying Heat — 2:16.54 (→ did not advance)

== Synchronized swimming ==
Three synchronized swimmers competed as independent Olympic participants in 1992.

Women's solo

- (Federal Republic of Yugoslavia) Marija Senica
- (Federal Republic of Yugoslavia) Maja Kos
- (Federal Republic of Yugoslavia) Vanja Mičeta

Women's duet

- (Federal Republic of Yugoslavia) Maja Kos
- (Federal Republic of Yugoslavia) Vanja Mičeta

== Table tennis ==
- (Federal Republic of Yugoslavia) Ilija Lupulesku
- (Federal Republic of Yugoslavia) Zoran Kalinić
- (Federal Republic of Yugoslavia) Slobodan Grujić
- (Federal Republic of Yugoslavia) Jasna Fazlić-Reed
- (Federal Republic of Yugoslavia) Gordana Perkučin

== Tennis ==
Men

Athlete	Nationality	Event	Round of 64	Round of 32	Round of 16	Quarterfinals	Semifinals	Final / BM	
Athlete	Nationality	Event	Opposition Score	Opposition Score	Opposition Score	Opposition Score	Opposition Score	Opposition Score	Rank
Srđan Muškatirović	(Federal Republic of Yugoslavia) FRY	Singles	Jaime Oncins (BRA); L 6:7, 6:4, 1:6, 6:4, 1:6	Did not advance					

== Wrestling ==
Men's freestyle 57 kg

- (North Macedonia) Zoran Šorov
  - Pool A
    - Lost to Jürgen Scheibe (GER) (2-6)
    - Lost to Rumen Pavlov (BUL) by fall
  - 7th in pool, did not advance

Men's Greco-Roman

- (Federal Republic of Yugoslavia) Senad Rizvanović
- (Federal Republic of Yugoslavia) Zoran Galović
- (Federal Republic of Yugoslavia) Nandor Sabo
- (Federal Republic of Yugoslavia) Željko Trajković
- (Federal Republic of Yugoslavia) Goran Kasum
- (Federal Republic of Yugoslavia) Pajo Ivošević
- (Federal Republic of Yugoslavia) Miloš Govedarica
- (Federal Republic of Yugoslavia) Milan Radaković

== See also ==
- Independent Paralympic participants at the 1992 Summer Paralympics
