= Synchronised swimming at the 1994 Commonwealth Games =

- Venue: Saanich Commonwealth Place
- Dates: 19–22 August 1994

Synchronised swimming at the 1994 Commonwealth Games was the third appearance of Synchronised swimming at the Commonwealth Games, and was held in Victoria, British Columbia from 19 to 22 August.

The events took place at the Saanich Aquatic Complex, at Saanich Commonwealth Place, on 4636 Elk Lake Drive in Saanich. The centre was constructed in 1993, specifically with the Games in mind and cost $22 million.

Canada topped the medal table winning both of the gold medals that were available.

== Medal table ==
* Host nation (Canada)

Rank	Nation	Gold	Silver	Bronze	Total
1	Canada*	2	0	0	2
2	England	0	2	0	2
3	Australia	0	0	2	2
Totals (3 entries)		2	2	2	6

== Medalists ==
Event	Gold	Silver	Bronze
Solo	Lisa Alexander; Canada	Kerry Shacklock; England	Celeste Ferraris; Australia
Duet	Canada; Lisa Alexander; Erin Woodley	England; Kerry Shacklock; Laila Vakil	Australia; Monique Downes; Celeste Ferraris
