= Australia at the 1994 Commonwealth Games =

- CG code: AUS
- CGA: Australian Commonwealth Games Association
- Website: commonwealthgames.org.au

in Victoria, British Columbia, Canada
- Competitors: 241
- Flag bearers: Opening: Ian Hale; Closing:
- Officials: 92
- Medals Ranked 1st: Gold 87 Silver 52 Bronze 43 Total 182

Commonwealth Games appearances (overview)
- 1930; 1934; 1938; 1950; 1954; 1958; 1962; 1966; 1970; 1974; 1978; 1982; 1986; 1990; 1994; 1998; 2002; 2006; 2010; 2014; 2018; 2022; 2026; 2030

Australia at the 1994 Commonwealth Games was abbreviated AUS. This was their fifteenth of 15 Commonwealth Games having participated in all Games meets up to these Games.

== Medallists ==
'The following Australian competitors won medals at the games.

Medal	Name	Sport	Event
Gold	Steve Moneghetti	Athletics	Men's marathon
Gold	Nick A'Hern	Athletics	Men's 30km walk
Gold	Tim Forsyth	Athletics	Men's high jump
Gold	Werner Reiterer	Athletics	Men's discus throw
Gold	Sean Carlin	Athletics	Men's hammer throw
Gold	Paul Wiggins	Athletics	Men's wheelchair marathon
Gold	Cathy Freeman	Athletics	Women's 200 metres
Gold	Cathy Freeman	Athletics	Women's 400 metres
Gold	Kerry Saxby-Junna	Athletics	Women's 30km walk
Gold	Alison Inverarity	Athletics	Women's high jump
Gold	Nicole Boegman	Athletics	Women's long jump
Gold	Daniela Costian	Athletics	Women's discus throw
Gold	Louise McPaul	Athletics	Women's javelin throw
Gold	Lisa Campbell	Badminton	Women's singles
Gold	Rex Johnston; Cameron Curtis	Bowls	Men's pairs
Gold	Robert Peden	Boxing	Men's bantamweight
Gold	Shane Kelly	Cycling	Men's Time Trial
Gold	Brad McGee	Cycling	Men's Individual Pursuit
Gold	Gary Neiwand	Cycling	Men's Sprint
Gold	Brett Aitken; Brad McGee; Stuart O'Grady; Tim O'Shannessey	Cycling	Men's Team Pursuit
Gold	Brett Aitken	Cycling	Men's Points Race
Gold	Stuart O'Grady	Cycling	Men's 10 Mile Scratch
Gold	Phil Anderson; Brett Dennis; Henk Vogels; Damian McDonald	Cycling	Men's Road Team Trial
Gold	Kathy Watt	Cycling	Women's Individual Pursuit
Gold	Kathy Watt	Cycling	Women's Road Race
Gold	Catherine Reardon; Kathy Watt; Louise Nolan; Rachel Victor	Cycling	Women's Road Time Trial
Gold	Michael Murphy	Diving	Men's 3 m Springboard
Gold	Michael Murphy	Diving	Men's 10 m Platform
Gold	Peter Hogan	Gymnastics	Men's Parallel Bars
Gold	Bret Hudson	Gymnastics	Men's Vault
Gold	Brennon Dowrick	Gymnastics	Men's Pommel Horse
Gold	Rebecca Stoyel	Gymnastics	Women's Uneven Bars
Gold	Salli Wills	Gymnastics	Women's Beam
Gold	Kasumi Takahashi	Gymnastics	Rhythmic - All Around
Gold	Kasumi Takahashi	Gymnastics	Rhythmic - Ball
Gold	Kasumi Takahashi	Gymnastics	Rhythmic - Clubs
Gold	Kasumi Takahashi	Gymnastics	Rhythmic - Hoop
Gold	Kasumi Takahashi	Gymnastics	Rhythmic - Ribbon
Gold	Phil Adams; Bengt Sandström	Shooting	Men's 50m Free Pistol – Pairs
Gold	Pat Murray; Robert Dowling	Shooting	Men's 25m Rapid-Fire Pistol – Pairs
Gold	Mike Giustiniano; Bengt Sandström	Shooting	Men's 10m Air Pistol – Pairs
Gold	Christine Trefry	Shooting	Women's 25m Sport Pistol
Gold	Christine Trefry; Annette Woodward	Shooting	Women's 25m Sport Pistol – Pairs
Gold	Christine Trefry; Annette Woodward	Shooting	Women's 10m Air Pistol – Pairs
Gold	Bert Bowden; Geoffrey Grenfell	Shooting	Men's Full Bore Rifle – Pairs
Gold	Bryan Wilson; Geoffrey Grenfell	Shooting	Men's 10m Running Target
Gold	Kim Frazer; Sylvia Purdie	Shooting	Women's 50m Small Bore Rifle Prone – Pairs
Gold	Ian Hale	Shooting	Men's Skeet
Gold	Kieren Perkins	Swimming	Men's 200 m Freestyle
Gold	Kieren Perkins	Swimming	Men's 400 m Freestyle
Gold	Kieren Perkins	Swimming	Men's 1500 m Freestyle
Gold	Phil Rogers	Swimming	Men's 100 m Breaststroke
Gold	Scott Miller	Swimming	Men's 100 m Butterfly
Gold	Matthew Dunn	Swimming	Men's 200 m Individual Medley
Gold	Matthew Dunn	Swimming	Men's 400 m Individual Medley
Gold	Andrew Baildon; Chris Fydler; Darren Lange; Dwade Sheehan	Swimming	Men's 4 x 100 m Freestyle
Gold	Glen Housman; Kieren Perkins; Martin Roberts; Matthew Dunn	Swimming	Men's 4 x 200 m Freestyle
Gold	Chris Fydler; Phil Rogers; Scott Miller; Steven Dewick	Swimming	Men's 4 x 100 m Medley
Gold	Karen van Wirdum	Swimming	Women's 50 m Freestyle
Gold	Susie O'Neill	Swimming	Women's 200 m Freestyle
Gold	Hayley Lewis	Swimming	Women's 400 m Freestyle
Gold	Stacey Gartrell	Swimming	Women's 800 m Freestyle
Gold	Nicole Stevenson	Swimming	Women's 100 m Backstroke
Gold	Nicole Stevenson	Swimming	Women's 200 m Backstroke
Gold	Samantha Riley	Swimming	Women's 100 m Breaststroke
Gold	Samantha Riley	Swimming	Women's 200 m Breaststroke
Gold	Petria Thomas	Swimming	Women's 100 m Butterfly
Gold	Susie O'Neill	Swimming	Women's 200 m Butterfly
Gold	Elli Overton	Swimming	Women's 200 m Individual Medley
Gold	Elli Overton	Swimming	Women's 400 m Individual Medley
Gold	Anna Windsor; Hayley Lewis; Nicole Stevenson; Susan O'Neill	Swimming	Women's 4 x 200 m Freestyle
Gold	Karen van Wirdum; Nicole Stevenson; Petria Thomas; Samantha Riley	Swimming	Women's 4 x 100 m Medley
Gold	Melissa Carlton	Swimming	Women's 100 m Freestyle S9
Gold	Sevdalin Marinov	Weightlifting	Men's Featherweight - Overall
Gold	Damian Brown	Weightlifting	Men's Middleweight - Clean and Jerk
Gold	Kiril Kounev	Weightlifting	Men's Light Heavyweight - Overall
Gold	Kiril Kounev	Weightlifting	Men's Light Heavyweight - Clean and Jerk
Gold	Kiril Kounev	Weightlifting	Men's Light Heavyweight - Snatch
Gold	Harvey Goodman	Weightlifting	Men's Middle Heavyweight - Overall
Gold	Harvey Goodman	Weightlifting	Men's Middle Heavyweight - Clean and Jerk
Gold	Harvey Goodman	Weightlifting	Men's Middle Heavyweight - Snatch
Gold	Nicu Vlad	Weightlifting	Men's Heavyweight - Overall
Gold	Nicu Vlad	Weightlifting	Men's Heavyweight - Clean and Jerk
Gold	Nicu Vlad	Weightlifting	Men's Heavyweight - Snatch
Gold	Stefan Botev	Weightlifting	Men's Super Heavyweight - Overall
Gold	Stefan Botev	Weightlifting	Men's Heavyweight - Clean and Jerk
Gold	Steven Kettner	Weightlifting	Men's Heavyweight - Snatch
Silver	Sean Quilty	Athletics	Men's marathon
Silver	Shane Naylor; Tim Jackson; Paul Henderson; Damien Marsh; Kyle Vander Kuyp	Athletics	Men's 4 x 100 metres
Silver	David Culbert	Athletics	Men's long jump
Silver	Peter Winter	Athletics	Men's decathlon
Silver	Monique Miers; Cathy Freeman; Melinda Gainsford; Kathy Sambell	Athletics	Women's 4 x 100 metres
Silver	Anne Manning	Athletics	Women's 30km walk
Silver	Jane Flemming	Athletics	Women's heptathlon
Silver	Ian Taylor; Robert Ball; Stephen Anderson; Steve Srhoy	Bowls	Men's fours
Silver	John Hubbard	Bowls	Men's Singles - Blind
Silver	Darren Hill	Cycling	Men's Time Trial
Silver	Stuart O'Grady	Cycling	Men's Points Race
Silver	Michelle Ferris	Cycling	Women's Sprint
Silver	Michael Murphy	Diving	Men's 1 m Springboard
Silver	Jodie Rogers	Diving	Women's 1 m Springboard
Silver	Brennon Dowrick	Gymnastics	Men's All Round
Silver	Nathan Kingston	Gymnastics	Men's Pommel Horse
Silver	Peter Hogan	Gymnastics	Men's Rings
Silver	Brennon Dowrick; Bret Hudson; Nathan Kingston; Peter Hogan	Gymnastics	Men's Team
Silver	Rebecca Stoyel	Gymnastics	Women's All Round
Silver	Kasumi Takahashi; Katie Mitchell; Leigh Marning	Gymnastics	Rhythmic - Team
Silver	Phil Adams	Shooting	Men's 50m Free Pistol
Silver	Kelvin Vickers; Phil Adams	Shooting	Men's 25m Centre-Fire Pistol – Pairs
Silver	Robert Dowling	Shooting	Men's 25m Rapid-Fire Pistol
Silver	Annette Woodward	Shooting	Women's 10m Air Pistol
Silver	Sylvia Purdie	Shooting	Women's 50m Rifle Prone
Silver	Darren Lange	Swimming	Men's 50 m Freestyle
Silver	Chris Fydler	Swimming	Men's 100 m Freestyle
Silver	Daniel Kowalski	Swimming	Men's 1500 m Freestyle
Silver	Steven Dewick	Swimming	Men's 100 m Backstroke
Silver	Phil Rogers	Swimming	Men's 200 m Breaststroke
Silver	Scott Miller	Swimming	Men's 200 m Butterfly
Silver	Karen van Wirdum	Swimming	Women's 100 m Freestyle
Silver	Nicole Stevenson	Swimming	Women's 200 m Freestyle
Silver	Stacey Gartrell	Swimming	Women's 400 m Freestyle
Silver	Hayley Lewis	Swimming	Women's 800 m Freestyle
Silver	Elli Overton	Swimming	Women's 100 m Backstroke
Silver	Rebecca Brown	Swimming	Women's 100 m Breaststroke
Silver	Rebecca Brown	Swimming	Women's 200 m Breaststroke
Silver	Susie O'Neill	Swimming	Women's 100 m Butterfly
Silver	Hayley Lewis	Swimming	Women's 200 m Butterfly
Silver	Elli Overton; Karen van Wirdum; Sarah Ryan; Susan O'Neill	Swimming	Women's 4 x 100 Freestyle
Silver	Brendan Burkett	Swimming	Men's 100 m Freestyle S9
Silver	Sevdalin Marinov	Weightlifting	Men's Featherweight - Snatch
Silver	Sevdalin Marinov	Weightlifting	Men's Featherweight - Clean and Jerk
Silver	Damian Brown	Weightlifting	Men's Middleweight - Overall
Silver	Andrew Saxton	Weightlifting	Men's Sub Heavyweight - Overall
Silver	Andrew Saxton	Weightlifting	Men's Sub Heavyweight - Clean and Jerk
Silver	Andrew Saxton	Weightlifting	Men's Sub Heavyweight - Snatch
Silver	Stefan Botev	Weightlifting	Men's Heavyweight - Clean and Jerk
Silver	Steven Kettner	Weightlifting	Men's Heavyweight - Overall
Silver	Steven Kettner	Weightlifting	Men's Heavyweight - Clean and Jerk
Silver	Rein Ozoline	Wrestling	Men's Welterweight
Bronze	James Miller	Athletics	Men's pole vault
Bronze	Paul Wiggins	Athletics	Men's wheelchair 800 m
Bronze	Melinda Gainsford	Athletics	Women's 200 metres
Bronze	Lisa-Marie Vizaniari	Athletics	Women's shot put
Bronze	Song Yang	Badminton	Women's singles
Bronze	Peter Blackburn; Mark Nichols	Badminton	Women's doubles
Bronze	Peter Blackburn; Rhonda Cator	Badminton	Mixed doubles
Bronze	Peter Blackburn; Lisa Campbell; Rhonda Cator; Amanda Hardy; Murray Hocking; Stuart Metcalfe; Mark Nichols; Wendy Shinners; Paul Stevenson; Song Yang	Badminton	Team events
Bronze	Robert Parrella	Bowls	Men's singles
Bronze	James Swan	Boxing	Men's featherweight
Bronze	Richard Rowles	Boxing	Men's welterweight
Bronze	Tim O'Shannessey	Cycling	Men's Time Trial
Bronze	Darren Hill	Cycling	Men's Sprint
Bronze	Stuart O'Grady	Cycling	Men's Individual Pursuit
Bronze	Dean Woods	Cycling	Men's Points Race
Bronze	Jodie Rogers	Diving	Women's 3 m Springboard
Bronze	Peter Hogan	Gymnastics	Men's All Round
Bronze	Brennon Dowrick	Gymnastics	Men's Parallel Bars
Bronze	Brennon Dowrick	Gymnastics	Men's Rings
Bronze	Nathan Kingston	Gymnastics	Men's Horizontal Bar
Bronze	Ruth Moniz	Gymnastics	Women's Beam
Bronze	Joanna Hughes; Rebecca Stoyel; Ruth Moniz; Salli Wills	Gymnastics	Women's Team
Bronze	Leigh Marning	Gymnastics	Rhythmic - Clubs
Bronze	Bengt Sandström	Shooting	Men's 50m Free Pistol
Bronze	Pat Murray	Shooting	Men's 25m Rapid-Fire Pistol
Bronze	Annette Woodward	Shooting	Women's 25m Sport Pistol
Bronze	David Clifton; Dean Turley	Shooting	Men's 50m Rifle Prone – Pairs
Bronze	Andrew Baildon	Swimming	Men's 100 m Freestyle
Bronze	Daniel Kowalski	Swimming	Men's 400 m Freestyle
Bronze	Glen Housman	Swimming	Men's 1500 m Freestyle
Bronze	Scott Miller	Swimming	Men's 200 m Backstroke
Bronze	Adam Pine	Swimming	Men's 100 m Butterfly
Bronze	Phillip Bryant	Swimming	Men's 400 m Individual Medley
Bronze	Elli Overton	Swimming	Women's 200 m Backstroke
Bronze	Elli Overton	Swimming	Women's 100 m Butterfly
Bronze	Julie Majer	Swimming	Women's 200 m Butterfly
Bronze	Hayley Lewis	Swimming	Women's 400 m Individual Medley
Bronze	Kelly Barnes	Swimming	Women's 100 m Freestyle S9
Bronze	Celeste Ferraris	Synchronised swimming	Women's Solo
Bronze	Monique Downes; Celeste Ferraris	Synchronised swimming	Women's Duet
Bronze	Damian Brown	Weightlifting	Men's Middleweight - Snatch
Bronze	Phillip Christou	Weightlifting	Men's Sub Heavyweight - Snatch
Bronze	Cory O'Brien	Wrestling	Men's Bantamweight

Medals by sport
Sport	1st place, gold medalist(s)	2nd place, silver medalist(s)	3rd place, bronze medalist(s)	
Swimming	25	17	11	53
Weightlifting	14	9	2	25
Athletics	13	7	4	24
Shooting	10	5	4	19
Gymnastics	10	6	7	23
Cycling	10	3	4	17
Diving	2	2	1	6
Lawn bowls	1	2	1	4
Badminton	1	0	4	4
Boxing	1	0	2	3
Wrestling	0	1	1	2
Synchronised swimming	0	0	2	2
Total	87	52	43	182

== See also ==
- Australia at the 1992 Summer Olympics
- Australia at the 1996 Summer Olympics
