= Müllner =

Müllner is a German surname. Notable people with the surname include:

- Adolf Müllner (1774-1829), German critic and dramatic poet
- Beatrix Müllner (born 1970), Austrian synchronized swimmer
- Christine Müllner (born 1975), Austrian synchronized swimmer
- Josef Müllner (1879-1968), Austrian sculptor
