= Mizuho Katayama =

South Korean swimmer (born 1969)

Personal information
- Born: 27 November 1969 (age 56) Izumiōtsu, Osaka Prefecture, Japan
- Height: 1.58 m (5 ft 2 in)
- Weight: 50 kg (110 lb)

Korean name
- Hangul: 김미진수
- Hanja: 金美津穗
- Revised Romanization: Gim Mijinsu
- McCune–Reischauer: Kim Mijinsu

Japanese name
- Kanji: 片山 満津芳 (earlier 片山 美津穂)
- Romanization: Katayama Mizuho

Alternative Japanese name
- Kanji: 高智 美津穂
- Romanization: Kōchi Mizuho

Sport
- Sport: Synchronized swimming
- Updated on 16 November 2014

Mizuho Katayama (片山 満津芳; born 27 November 1969) is a synchronized swimming coach in Japan. Born to a Korean family in Japan, she participated in Japanese domestic synchronized swimming competitions under the name Mizuho Kōchi, and represented South Korea in international competitions under the name Kim Mijinsu, most notably in the women's solo and women's duet competitions at the 1988 Summer Olympics. After her retirement from the South Korean national team, she married and began using her current name.

== Early life ==
Katayama is a third-generation Korean resident of Japan and was born in Izumiōtsu, Osaka Prefecture. Her only given name since birth has been the Japanese given name Mizuho; her legal birth surname was Kim, while she used the Japanese name Mizuho Kōchi as a pass name. She began participating in synchronized swimming from her fifth year of elementary school, and was trained at the Hamadera Swimming School in Sakai, where her coach was Akiko Motoyoshi, the younger sister of Japanese Olympic bronze medallist Miwako Motoyoshi. She went on to attend Hagoromo Academy High School in Takaishi. She entered the Osaka University of Health and Sport Sciences in 1987.

== Career ==
She competed in Japanese national championships, but could not represent Japan in international competition because she was not a Japanese citizen. In December 1987, she was invited by the Korea Swimming Federation, South Korea's official aquatics governing body, to be part of the first delegation to represent South Korea in synchronized swimming at the 1988 Summer Olympics in Seoul. She competed under the name Kim Mijinsu, where "Mijinsu" is the Korean pronunciation of the characters she used at the time for her given name Mizuho. She came in 27th place in the women's solo with a score of 86.350, and in 10th place in the women's duet competitions with a score of 89.500. She again represented South Korea in the duet routine at the 1991 World Aquatics Championships with partner Choe Jeong-yun, and placed thirteenth. She placed first in the duet routine at the 1991 Japan Synchro Challenge Cup with partner Chiaki Yamamura (山村千晶).

After her wedding in 1993 to a Japanese man from Hiroshima, she used the married name Mizuho Katayama. She moved to Hiroshima, and became an instructor at the Hiroshima Synchronized Swimming Club, a board member of the Hiroshima Prefectural Swimming Federation, and a synchronized swimming referee for the National Sports Festival of Japan. She was the coach for the Japanese team at the 2003 and 2004 Swiss Open Synchronized Swimming organized by Limmat-Nixen Zürich. She was later the head coach for Japan's junior synchronized swimming team at the Asia Swimming Federation's 2007 Asian Age Group Championships in Jakarta, Indonesia, and the 2008 FINA World Junior Synchronised Swimming Championships in Saint Petersburg, Russia. She was promoted to head coach of Japan's national synchronized swimming team for the 2009 World Aquatics Championships in Rome, Italy. At the synchronized swimming school Artistic Swimming Hiroshima (アーティスティックスイミング広島), she was the coach of future Olympian Moe Higa from 2016 to 2022.
