= Synchronised swimming at the 1994 Commonwealth Games – Women's solo =

Commonwealth Event

Women's solo at the 1994 Commonwealth Games
- Venue: Saanich Commonwealth Place
- Dates: 19–22 August 1994

Medalists
gold medal	Lisa Alexander	Canada
silver medal	Kerry Shacklock	England
bronze medal	Celeste Ferraris	Australia

The Women's solo event during the synchronised swimming competition at the 1994 Commonwealth Games in Victoria, British Columbia was held from 19 to 22 August at Saanich Commonwealth Place.

== Results ==
Six athletes competed.

=== Final ===
Rank	Athlete	Total
1st place, gold medalist(s)	Lisa Alexander (CAN)	189.4835
2nd place, silver medalist(s)	Kerry Shacklock (ENG)	183.9717
3rd place, bronze medalist(s)	Celeste Ferraris (AUS)	172.6626
4	Mandy Zukerman (NZL)	170.1886
5	Sarah Burgon (SCO)	156.6515
6	Renata Peslova (RSA)	149.9219
