= Heike Friedrich (synchronized swimmer) =

West German synchronized swimmer

Personal information
- Nationality: West Germany
- Born: 22 August 1966 (age 59) Berlin, Germany
- Height: 1.71 m (5 ft 7 in)
- Weight: 60 kg (132 lb)

Sport
- Sport: Swimming
- Strokes: Synchronized swimming
- Club: Freie Schwimmer Bochum

Heike Friedrich (born 22 August 1966) is a former synchronized swimmer from Germany. She competed for West Germany in both the women's solo and women's duet competitions at the 1988 Summer Olympics.
