= Tatyana Titova =

Tatyana Titova may refer to:

- Tatyana Titova (runner) (born 1965), Russian long-distance runner
- Tatyana Titova (synchronised swimmer) (born 1967), Russian synchronised swimmer
