= Kapor =

Kapor may refer to:

- Freada Kapor Klein (born 1952), American criminologist
- Milovan Kapor (born 1991), Canadian soccer player
- Mitch Kapor (born 1950), American businessperson
- Mladen Kapor (born 1966), Yugoslav swimmer
- Momo Kapor (born 1937), Serbian novelist
- Kapor, the Hungarian name for Copru village, Cătina Commune, Cluj County, Romania
