= Zhang Ying (synchronised swimmer) =

Chinese synchronised swimmer

Personal information
- Nationality: China
- Born: 28 July 1963 (age 62)
- Height: 1.67 m (5 ft 6 in)
- Weight: 52 kg (115 lb)

Sport
- Sport: Swimming
- Strokes: Synchronised swimming

Zhang Ying (Chinese: 张颖; born 28 July 1963) is a former synchronised swimmer from China. She competed in the women's solo competition at the 1988 Summer Olympics.
