= Érika MacDavid =

Brazilian synchronized swimmer

Érika MacDavid (aka Erika McDavid, Erika McDavid Perri)
Personal information
- Nationality: Brazil
- Born: 15 December 1970 (age 55)
- Height: 5 ft 8 in (173 cm)
- Weight: 57 kg (126 lb)

Sport
- Sport: Swimming
- Strokes: Synchronized swimming
- Updated on 8 February 2015

Érika MacDavid (born 15 December 1970) is a former synchronized swimmer from Brazil. She competed in both the women's solo and women's duet competitions at the 1988 Summer Olympics.
