= Yvette Thuis =

Aruban synchronized swimmer (born 1971)

Personal information
- Nationality: Aruba
- Born: 23 May 1971 (age 55)
- Height: 1.67 m (5 ft 6 in)
- Weight: 58 kg (128 lb)

Sport
- Sport: Swimming
- Strokes: Synchronized swimming
- Club: Barracuda Synchronized Swimming Club

Yvette Thuis (born 23 May 1971) is a former synchronized swimmer from Aruba. She competed in the women's solo and women's duet at the 1988 Summer Olympics.
