= Marija Senica =

Serbian synchronized swimmer (born 1970)

Personal information
- Nationality: Serbia
- Born: 25 August 1970 (age 55)

Sport
- Sport: Swimming
- Strokes: Synchronized swimming
- Updated on 21 May 2015

Marija Senica (Serbian: Марија Сеница) (born 25 August 25 1970) is a Serbian synchronized swimmer.

Marija competed as an Independent Olympic Participant at the 1992 Summer Olympics in Barcelona and took twenty-first place in the women's solo.

She currently works as a national team coach for Serbia.
