= Lian Goodwin =

British synchronised swimmer

Personal information
- Full name: Lian Elizabeth Goodwin
- Nationality: United Kingdom
- Born: 29 April 1968 (age 58) Watford, England
- Height: 5 ft 11 in (180 cm)
- Weight: 58 kg (128 lb)

Sport
- Sport: Swimming
- Strokes: Synchronised swimming
- Club: Southport SC
- Updated on 8 February 2015

Lian Elizabeth Goodwin (born 29 April 1968) is a former synchronised swimmer from Great Britain. She competed in both the women's solo and women's duet competitions at the 1988 Summer Olympics.
