= Wang Xiaojie (synchronized swimmer) =

Chinese synchronised swimmer

Personal information
- Nationality: China
- Born: 19 November 1971 (age 54)
- Height: 5 ft 4 in (163 cm)
- Weight: 50 kg (110 lb)

Sport
- Sport: Swimming
- Strokes: Synchronized swimming

Wang Xiaojie (Chinese: 王晓洁, born 19 November 1971) is a former synchronized swimmer from China. She competed in both the women's solo and the women's duet competitions at the 1992 Summer Olympics and came in 8th in the women's duet event.
