= Roswitha Lopez =

Aruban synchronized swimmer (born 1969)

Personal information
- Nationality: Aruba
- Born: 13 November 1969 (age 56)
- Height: 1.69 m (5 ft 7 in)
- Weight: 58 kg (128 lb)

Sport
- Sport: Swimming
- Strokes: Synchronized swimming
- Club: Barracuda Synchronized Swimming Club
- Updated on 16 November 2014

Roswitha Lopez (born 13 November 1969) is a former synchronized swimmer from Aruba. She competed in the women's solo and women's duet at the 1988 Summer Olympics.
