= Marjolijn Both =

Dutch synchronized swimmer

Personal information
- Nationality: Netherlands
- Born: 9 September 1971 (age 54) Amsterdam, Netherlands
- Height: 5 ft 7 in (170 cm)
- Weight: 57 kg (126 lb)

Sport
- Sport: Swimming
- Strokes: Synchronized swimming
- Club: Zwemvereniging De Dolfijn
Medal record
Representing Netherlands
Synchronized swimming
European Aquatics Championships
Bronze medal – third place	1991 Athens	Women's duet
- Updated on 22 May 2015

Marjolijn Both (born 9 September 1971) is a former synchronized swimmer from The Netherlands. She competed in both the women's solo and the women's duet competitions at the 1992 Summer Olympics.
