= Cristiana Lobo (swimmer) =

Brazilian synchronized swimmer

Personal information
- Full name: Cristiana Silveira Lobo
- Nationality: Brazil
- Born: 23 June 1972 (age 54)

Sport
- Sport: Swimming
- Strokes: Synchronized swimming
- Club: Flamengo
- Updated on 30 May 2015

Cristiana Lobo (born 23 June 1972) is a former synchronized swimmer from Brazil. She competed in both the women's solo and women's duet competitions at the 1992 Summer Olympics.
