= Tamara Zwart =

Dutch synchronized swimmer

Personal information
- Nationality: Netherlands
- Born: 20 February 1975 (age 51) Amsterdam, Netherlands
- Height: 5 ft 6 in (168 cm)
- Weight: 57 kg (126 lb)

Sport
- Sport: Swimming
- Strokes: Synchronized swimming
- Club: Zwemvereniging De Dolfijn
Medal record
Representing Netherlands
Synchronized swimming
European Aquatics Championships
Bronze medal – third place	1991 Athens	Women's duet
- Updated on 22 May 2015

Tamara Zwart (born 20 February 1975) is a former synchronized swimmer from The Netherlands. She competed in both the women's solo and the women's duet competitions at the 1992 Summer Olympics.
