= Lucie Svrčinová =

Czech synchronized swimmer

Personal information
- Nationality: Czechoslovakia
- Born: 27 November 1974 (age 51) Brno, Czechoslovakia
- Height: 1.68 m (5 ft 6 in)
- Weight: 55 kg (121 lb)

Sport
- Sport: Swimming
- Strokes: Synchronized swimming
- Club: Tesla Brno
- Updated on 16 November 2014

Lucie Svrčinová (born 27 November 1974) is a former synchronized swimmer from Czechoslovakia. She competed in the women's solo competition at the 1992 Summer Olympics.
