= Monika Müller =

German synchronized swimmer

Personal information
- Nationality: Germany
- Born: 11 May 1971 (age 55) Reichenbach, East Germany
- Height: 5 ft 8 in (173 cm)
- Weight: 58 kg (128 lb)

Sport
- Sport: Swimming
- Strokes: Synchronized swimming
- Club: Turnverein Markgröningen
- Updated on 21 May 2015

Monika Müller (born 11 May 1971) is a former synchronized swimmer from Germany. She competed in the women's solo and women's duet competitions at the 1992 Summer Olympics.
