= Liisa Laurila =

Finnish synchronized swimmer

Personal information
- Full name: Liisa Mari Laurila
- Nationality: Finland
- Born: 1 March 1974 (age 52) Kajaani, Finland
- Height: 1.68 m (5 ft 6 in)
- Weight: 52 kg (115 lb)

Sport
- Sport: Swimming
- Strokes: Synchronized swimming
- Updated on 16 November 2014

Liisa Laurila (born 1 March 1974) is a former synchronized swimmer from Finland. She competed in the women's solo competition at the 1992 Summer Olympics.
