= Fernanda Veirano =

Brazilian synchronized swimmer

Personal information
- Full name: Fernanda Camargo Veirano
- Nationality: Brazil
- Born: 6 June 1973 (age 53)

Sport
- Sport: Swimming
- Strokes: Synchronized swimming
- Club: Flamengo
- Updated on 30 May 2015

Fernanda Veirano (born 6 June 1973) is a former synchronized swimmer from Brazil. She competed in both the women's solo and women's duet competitions at the 1992 Summer Olympics.
