= Dušan Popeskov =

Serbian cyclist

Duško Popeskov
Personal information
- Born: 5 June 1969
- Died: 7 October 2018 (aged 49)

Cycling career
- Sport: Cycling

Duško Popeskov (Serbian Cyrillic: Душко Попесков; 5 June 1969 – 4 October 2018) was a Serbian cyclist. He competed in two events at the 1992 Summer Olympics as an Independent Olympic Participant.
