= Luo Xi (synchronized swimmer, born 1969) =

Chinese swimmer

Personal information
- National team: China
- Born: September 14, 1969 (age 55); Sichuan, China

Sport
- Sport: Swimming
- Strokes: Synchronised swimming

Luo Xi (Chinese: 罗玺, born 14 September 1969 in Sichuan) is a former Chinese competitor in synchronised swimming. She competed for China in both the women's solo and women's duet competitions at the 1988 Summer Olympics.
