= Ha Su-gyeong =

South Korean synchronized swimmer

Ha Sue-kyung
Personal information
- Nationality: South Korea
- Born: 17 May 1969 (age 57)
- Height: 1.65 m (5 ft 5 in)
- Weight: 54 kg (119 lb)

Sport
- Sport: Swimming
- Strokes: Synchronized swimming
- Club: Ohio State Buckeyes
- Updated on 16 November 2014

- Ha Su-gyeong
- Hangul: 하수경
- Hanja: 河秀卿
- RR: Ha Sugyeong
- MR: Ha Sugyŏng

Ha Sue-kyung (born 17 May 1969) is a former synchronized swimmer from South Korea. She competed in the women's solo and women's duet competitions at the 1988 Summer Olympics.
