= Eva Riera =

Brazilian synchronized swimmer

Personal information
- Nationality: Brazil
- Born: 16 May 1971
- Died: 13 January 2011 (aged 39)
- Height: 5 ft 6 in (168 cm)
- Weight: 58 kg (128 lb)

Sport
- Sport: Swimming
- Strokes: Synchronized swimming

Eva Riera (16 May 1971 – 13 January 2011) was a synchronized swimmer from Brazil. She competed in both the women's solo and women's duet competitions at the 1988 Summer Olympics.
