= Guan Zewen =

Chinese synchronized swimmer

Personal information
- Nationality: China
- Born: 11 November 1971 (age 54)
- Height: 5 ft 5 in (165 cm)
- Weight: 54 kg (119 lb)

Sport
- Sport: Swimming
- Strokes: Synchronized swimming
- Updated on 8 February 2015

Guan Zewen (Chinese: 关则文; born 11 November 1971) is a former synchronized swimmer from China. She competed in both the women's solo and the women's duet competitions at the 1992 Summer Olympics.
