= Kerry Shacklock =

British synchronised swimmer

Personal information
- Born: 30 October 1971 (age 54) Wokingham, England
- Height: 5 ft 7 in (170 cm)
- Weight: 57 kg (126 lb)

Sport
- Sport: Swimming
- Strokes: Synchronised swimming
- Club: Rushmoor Synchro
Medal record
Representing Great Britain
European Championships
Bronze medal – third place	1993 Sheffield	Solo
Bronze medal – third place	1993 Sheffield	Duet
Representing England
Commonwealth Games
Silver medal – second place	1990 Auckland	Solo
Silver medal – second place	1990 Auckland	Duet
Silver medal – second place	1994 Victoria	Solo
Silver medal – second place	1994 Victoria	Duet

Kerry Payne (née Shacklock; born 30 October 1971) is an English former synchronised swimmer. She represented Great Britain at the 1992 Olympic Games in Barcelona, finishing seventh in the solo event and sixth in the duet with Laila Vakil. She also won two bronze medals at the 1993 European Championships, and is a four-time Commonwealth Games silver medalist.

== Achievements ==
Year	Competition	Venue	Position	Event	Notes
1989	World Junior Championships	Cali, Colombia	4th	solo	
1989	European Championships	Bonn, West Germany	4th	solo	
1989	European Championships	Bonn, West Germany	4th	duet	
1989	European Championships	Bonn, West Germany	4th	team	
1990	Commonwealth Games	Auckland, New Zealand	2nd	solo	
1990	Commonwealth Games	Auckland, New Zealand	2nd	duet	
1991	European Championships	Athens, Greece	5th	solo	
1991	European Championships	Athens, Greece	6th	duet	
1991	European Championships	Athens, Greece	4th	team	
1992	Olympic Games	Barcelona, Spain	7th	solo	
1992	Olympic Games	Barcelona, Spain	6th	duet	
1993	European Championships	Sheffield, England	3rd	solo	
1993	European Championships	Sheffield, England	3rd	duet	
1993	European Championships	Sheffield, England	4th	team	
1994	Commonwealth Games	Victoria, Canada	2nd	solo	
1994	Commonwealth Games	Victoria, Canada	2nd	duet	
1994	World Championships	Rome, Italy	8th	duet	
1994	World Championships	Rome, Italy	9th	team	
