= Gláucia Soutinho =

Brazilian synchronized swimmer

Glaucia Soutinho
Personal information
- Full name: Glaucia Tinoco Arpon Soutinho
- Nationality: Brazil
- Born: 27 September 1970 (age 55) Rio de Janeiro

Sport
- Sport: Swimming
- Strokes: Synchronized swimming
- Updated on 21 May 2015

Glaucia Soutinho (born 27 September 1970) is a former synchronized swimmer from Brazil. She competed in the women's solo competition at the 1992 Summer Olympics.
