= Christopher Harrison (water polo) =

Australian water polo player

Personal information
- Born: October 3, 1957 (age 69)

Sport
- Sport: Water polo

Christopher Harrison (born 3 October 1957) is an Australian former water polo player who competed in the 1988 Summer Olympics.
