= Nicola Shearn =

British synchronised swimmer

Personal information
- Full name: Nicola Maria Shearn
- Born: 14 October 1966 (age 59) Keynsham, England
- Height: 1.74 m (5 ft 9 in)
- Weight: 60 kg (130 lb)

Sport
- Sport: Swimming
- Strokes: Synchronised swimming
- Club: Bristol Central SC
Medal record
Representing England
Commonwealth Games
Silver medal – second place	1986 Edinburgh	Duet

Nicola Maria Shearn (born 14 October 1966) is a British former synchronised swimmer. She competed in both the women's solo and women's duet competitions at the 1988 Summer Olympics. She also competed for England in the 1986 Commonwealth Games where she won a silver medal in the duet event alongside Amanda Dodd.
