= Beatrix Müllner =

Austrian synchronized swimmer

Beatrix Zoufal
Personal information
- Nationality: Austria
- Born: 19 May 1970 (age 56) Vienna, Austria
- Height: 5 ft 7 in (170 cm)
- Weight: 57 kg (126 lb)

Sport
- Sport: Swimming
- Strokes: Synchronized swimming
- Club: Schwimm-Union Wien
- Updated on 21 May 2015

Beatrix Zoufal (née Müllner; born 19 May 1970) is a former synchronized swimmer from Austria.

Beatrix competed in both the women's solo and the women's duet with her sister Christine Müllner at the 1992 Summer Olympics.
