= Kire Filipovski =

Macedonian swimmer

Personal information
- Born: 3 April 1973 (age 53)

Sport
- Sport: Swimming

Kire Filipovski (born 3 April 1973) is a Macedonian swimmer. He competed at the 1992 Summer Olympics and the 1996 Summer Olympics.
