= Roger Smith (field hockey) =

Australian hockey player

Roger David Smith (born 26 May 1960) is a former field hockey player from Australia, who competed in the 1988 Summer Olympics for his native country. He was a member of the Australia men's national field hockey team, best known as the Kookaburras.

== Personal ==
Roger lives in South Australia. He has been involved with the business Hockeyworld along with older brothers Trevor Smith (field hockey) and Terry Smith who also played hockey for Australia.

== Field hockey ==
=== International hockey ===
He made his Olympic Games debut in 1988 in Seoul where the Kookaburras finished fourth.

He played in the same team as Ric Charlesworth and Graham Reid (sportsman) who would go on to coach the national teams themselves.
