= Simon Asher =

Australian water polo player

Personal information
- Born: September 5, 1967 (age 57)

Sport
- Sport: Water polo

Simon Asher (born 5 September 1967) is an Australian water polo player who competed in the 1988 Summer Olympics and in the 1992 Summer Olympics.
