= Erin Woodley =

Canadian synchronized swimmer

Personal information
- Born: June 6, 1972 (age 54) Mississauga, Ontario

Sport
- Sport: Swimming
- Strokes: synchronized swimming
Medal record
Representing Canada
Women's synchronized swimming
Olympic Games
Silver medal – second place	1996 Atlanta	Team
World Aquatics Championships
Silver medal – second place	1994 Rome	Duet
Silver medal – second place	1994 Rome	Team
Pan American Games
Silver medal – second place	1995 Mar del Plata	Duet
Silver medal – second place	1995 Mar del Plata	Team
Commonwealth Games
Gold medal – first place	1994 Victoria	Duet

Erin Woodley (born June 6, 1972) was a Canadian competitor in synchronized swimming and Olympic medalist.

== Career ==
Woodley began synchronized swimming at age nine. She found her greatest success with partner Lisa Alexander, they won gold in duet at 1994 Commonwealth Games, silver at the 1994 World Aquatics Championships and a silver medal in duet at the 1995 Pan American Games. Woodley's most notable achievement was being a member of the Canadian team that received a silver medal in the team event at the 1996 Summer Olympics in Atlanta.

== Honours ==
Woodley was inducted into the Etobicoke Sports Hall of Fame in 2005.
