= Lisa Alexander (synchronized swimmer) =

Canadian synchronized swimmer

Personal information
- Born: September 22, 1968 (age 58) Toronto, Ontario, Canada

Sport
- Sport: Swimming
- Strokes: Synchronised swimming
Medal record
Women's Synchronised swimming
Representing Canada
Olympic Games
Silver medal – second place	1996 Atlanta	Team
World Aquatics Championships
Bronze medal – third place	1991 Perth	Duet
Silver medal – second place	1991 Perth	Team
Bronze medal – third place	1994 Rome	Solo
Silver medal – second place	1994 Rome	Duet
Silver medal – second place	1994 Rome	Team
Pan American Games
Silver medal – second place	1987 Indianapolis	Team
Silver medal – second place	1995 Mar del Plata	Duet
Silver medal – second place	1995 Mar del Plata	Team
Commonwealth Games
Gold medal – first place	1994 Victoria	Solo
Gold medal – first place	1994 Victoria	Duet

Lisa Alexander was (born in September 22, 1968) is a Canadian former competitor in synchronised swimming and Olympic medallist.

== Career ==
Born in Toronto, Ontario, Alexander began synchronized swimming at age eight. She had success in solo, duet and team events. Her original duet partner was Kathy Glen, with whom she would win a bronze medal at the 1991 World Aquatics Championships in Perth. Her second duet partner was Erin Woodley they would win gold at the 1994 Commonwealth Games, where Alexander would also win a gold in the solo event. At the 1994 World Aquatics Championships she would bring home three medals, a silver in team, a bronze in solo and a silver in duet. She and Woodley would then go on to win a silver medal in duet at the 1995 Pan American Games in Mar del Plata, Argentina. Alexander's most notable achievement was being team captain of Canadian team that received a silver medal in team event at the 1996 Summer Olympics in Atlanta.

=== Other work ===
Alexander was President of the Mississauga Sports Council and coached future Olympians at the Etobicoke Olympium.

== Honours ==
Alexander was Ontario's Female Athlete of the Year in 1995. Alexander was inducted into the Mississauga Sports Hall of Fame in 1999.
