= Christine Müllner =

Austrian synchronized swimmer

Personal information
- Nationality: Austria
- Born: 10 March 1975 (age 51) Vienna, Austria
- Height: 5 ft 9 in (175 cm)
- Weight: 56 kg (123 lb)

Sport
- Sport: Swimming
- Strokes: Synchronized swimming
- Club: Schwimm Union Perchtoldsdorf
- Updated on 21 May 2015

Christine Müllner (born 10 March 1975) is a former synchronized swimmer from Austria.

Christine competed in both the women's solo and the women's duet with her sister Beatrix Müllner at the 1992 Summer Olympics.
