= Aquatics at the 1994 Commonwealth Games =

- Venue: Saanich Aquatic Complex, Saanich Commonwealth Place
- Location: Victoria, Canada
- Dates: 18 to 28 August 1994

Aquatics at the 1994 Commonwealth Games was the 15th appearances of both Swimming at the Commonwealth Games and Diving at the Commonwealth Games and the third appearance of Synchronised swimming at the Commonwealth Games. Competition was held in Victoria, Canada, from 18 to 28 August 1994.

The events were held at the Saanich Aquatic Complex, at Saanich Commonwealth Place, on 4636 Elk Lake Drive in Saanich. The centre was constructed in 1993, specifically with the Games in mind and cost $22 million.

Australia topped the aquatics medal table with 27 gold medals.

== Medal table (all aquatic sports) ==
* Host nation (Canada)

Rank	Nation	Gold	Silver	Bronze	Total
1	Australia	27	19	14	60
2	Canada*	8	10	14	32
3	England	6	6	8	20
4	New Zealand	1	5	2	8
5	Zimbabwe	0	1	1	2
6	Wales	0	1	0	1
7	South Africa	0	0	2	2
8	Scotland	0	0	1	1
Totals (8 entries)		42	42	42	126
