= Andrew Wightman =

Australian water polo player

Personal information
- Born: October 26, 1967 (age 57)

Sport
- Sport: Water polo

Andrew Wightman (born 26 October 1967) is an Australian water polo player who competed in the 1988 Summer Olympics and in the 1992 Summer Olympics.
