= Athletics at the 1994 Commonwealth Games – Women's 10 kilometres walk =

Women's 10 kilometres walk at the Commonwealth Games

The women's 10 kilometres walk event at the 1994 Commonwealth Games was held in Victoria, British Columbia.

== Results ==
Rank	Name	Nationality	Time	Notes
1st place, gold medalist(s)	Kerry Saxby-Junna	Australia	44:25	
2nd place, silver medalist(s)	Anne Manning	Australia	44:37	
3rd place, bronze medalist(s)	Janice McCaffrey	Canada	44:54	
4	Holly Gerke	Canada	45:43	
5	Vicky Lupton	England	45:48	
6	Lisa Kehler	England	46:01	
7	Verity Snook-Larby	Scotland	46:06	
8	Jane Saville	Australia	47:14	
9	Carolyn Partington	Isle of Man	47:21	
10	Grace Karimi	Kenya	48:20	
11	Karen Smith	England	48:45	
12	Alison Baker	Canada	51:28	
	Agnetha Chelimo	Kenya	DNF	
	Linda Murphy	New Zealand	DQ	
