= Peter Noel =

Australian field hockey player

Peter Geoffrey Noel (born 28 March 1963), known as the Guru, is a former field hockey player from Australia, who competed in the 1988 Summer Olympics for his native country. He was a member of the Australia men's national field hockey team, best known as the Kookaburras.

== Personal ==
Noel lives in Adelaide, South Australia.

== Field hockey ==
=== Club hockey ===
Noel played club hockey for Campbeltown Hockey Club in South Australia – now North East Hockey Club. He now plays for Adelaide Hockey Club, for their Metro Competition M5 Men's division.

=== State hockey ===
Noel played in the Southern Hotshots team in the National Hockey League (now Australian Hockey League) in 1994, 1995 and 1996.

=== International hockey ===
He made his Olympic Games debut where he was a Goal Keeper in 1988 in Seoul where the Kookaburras finished fourth. He played in the same team as Ric Charlesworth and Graham Reid (sportsman) who would go on to coach the national teams themselves.
