= Maja Kos =

Serbian synchronized swimmer

Personal information
- Nationality: Serbia
- Born: 6 June 1968 Belgrade
- Died: 16 March 2000 (aged 31) Belgrade

Sport
- Sport: Swimming
- Strokes: Synchronized swimming
- Updated on 22 May 2015

Maja Kos (Serbian: Маја Кос) (6 June 1968 – 16 March 2000) was a synchronized swimmer from Serbia. Kos competed as an Independent Olympic Participant at the 1992 Summer Olympics in the women's duet.
