= Stephen Fairless =

Australian cyclist (born 1962)

Personal information
- Born: 21 May 1962 (age 64)

Cycling career
- Sport: Cycling

Stephen Fairless (born 21 May 1962) is an Australian former cyclist. He competed in two events at the 1988 Summer Olympics.
