= Nataša Meškovska =

Macedonian swimmer

Personal information
- Born: 9 February 1972 (age 54) Skopje, Yugoslavia

Sport
- Sport: Swimming

Nataša Meškovska (born 9 February 1972) is a Macedonian swimmer. She competed at the 1992 Summer Olympics and the 1996 Summer Olympics.
