= Athletics at the 1994 Commonwealth Games – Men's marathon =

Marathon event in 1994

Men's marathon at the Commonwealth Games

The men's marathon event at the 1994 Commonwealth Games was held in Victoria, British Columbia on 28 August.

== Results ==
Rank	Name	Nationality	Time	Notes
1st place, gold medalist(s)	Steve Moneghetti	Australia	2:11:49	
2nd place, silver medalist(s)	Sean Quilty	Australia	2:14:57	
3rd place, bronze medalist(s)	Mark Hudspith	England	2:15:11	
4	Dale Rixon	Wales	2:16:15	
5	Patrick Carroll	Australia	2:16:27	
6	Nicolas Kioko	Kenya	2:16:37	
7	Carey Nelson	Canada	2:16:52	
8	Colin Moore	England	2:18:07	
9	Bruce Deacon	Canada	2:18:46	
10	Zacharia Nyambaso	Kenya	2:18:51	
11	Elphas Ginindza	Swaziland	2:19:23	
12	Mothusi Tsiana	Botswana	2:20:00	
13	John Mwathiwa	Malawi	2:20:11	
14	Ronald Mujuni	Uganda	2:20:37	
15	Owen MacHelm	South Africa	2:20:39	
16	Fritz Awoseb	Namibia	2:21:27	
17	Smartex Tambala	Malawi	2:22:00	
18	Moses Matabane	Lesotho	2:22:03	
19	Thabiso Ralekhetla	Lesotho	2:22:04	
20	Acko Bennedict	Tanzania	2:22:12	
21	Paul Rotich	Kenya	2:23:20	
22	Cephas Matafi	Zimbabwe	2:24:13	
23	Cordover Simon	Antigua and Barbuda	2:31:49	NR
24	Dane Samuel	Saint Vincent and the Grenadines	2:33:01	
25	Poulo Makhoahle	Lesotho	2:33:44	
26	Brett Forgesson	Bermuda	2:34:23	
27	James Gombedza	Zimbabwe	2:43:01	
28	Hugh Marsden	Falkland Islands	2:43:31	
	Peter Maher	Canada	DNF	
	David Buzza	England	DNF	
