= Vanja Mičeta =

Serbian synchronized swimmer

Personal information
- Nationality: Serbia
- Born: 15 April 1969 (age 57)

Sport
- Sport: Swimming
- Strokes: Synchronized swimming
- Updated on 22 May 2015

Vanja Mičeta (Serbian: Вања Мичета) (15 April 1969) is a synchronized swimmer from Serbia.

Vanja competed as an Independent Olympic Participant at the 1992 Summer Olympics in the women's duet.
