= Graeme Banks =

Australian diver

Personal information
- Nationality: Australian
- Born: 19 May 1969 (age 56) Sydney, New South Wales, Australia

Sport
- Sport: Diving

Graeme Lachlan Banks (born 19 May 1969) is an Australian diver. He competed in two events at the 1988 Summer Olympics.
