= Aki Takayama =

Japanese synchronized swimmer

Personal information
- Nationality: Japan
- Born: March 12, 1970 (age 56) Osakasayama, Osaka, Japan
- Height: 165 cm (5 ft 5 in)
- Weight: 54 kg (119 lb)

Sport
- Sport: Swimming
- Strokes: Synchronised swimming
Medal record
Women's Synchronised swimming
Representing Japan
Olympic Games
Bronze medal – third place	1992 Barcelona	Duet
World Championships
Silver medal – second place	1991 Perth	Duet

Aki Takayama (Japanese: 高山亜樹; born March 12, 1970) is a former competitor in synchronised swimming from Japan.

Aki won a bronze medal in the women's duet event at the 1992 Summer Olympics with Fumiko Okuno.
