= Sean Quilty =

Australian long-distance runner (1966–2022)

Sean Patrick Quilty (16 May 1966 – 16 July 2022) was an Australian long-distance runner who competed in the 1996 Summer Olympics.

Quilty was born in Melbourne in 1966, where he also died on 16 July 2022, aged 56.

== Competition record ==
Year	Competition	Venue	Position	Event	Notes
Representing Australia
1994	Commonwealth Games	Victoria, Canada	2nd	Marathon	2:14:57
1995	World Championships	Gothenburg, Sweden	52nd	Marathon	2:37:01
1996	Olympic Games	Atlanta, United States	34th	Marathon	2:19:35
1997	World Championships	Seville, Spain	27th	Marathon	2:23:10
1998	Commonwealth Games	Kuala Lumpur, Malaysia	11th	Marathon	2:24:43
1999	World Championships	Seville, Spain	61st	Marathon	2:48:58
