= 2008 FINA World Junior Synchronised Swimming Championships =

The 11th FINA World Junior Synchronised Swimming Championships was held July 8–13, 2010 in St. Petersburg, Russia. The synchronised swimmers are aged between 15 and 18 years old, from 26 nations, swimming in four events: Solo, Duet, Team and Free combination.

== Participating nations ==
26 nations swam at the 2008 World Junior Championships were:

- Austria
- Belarus
- Brazil
- Canada
- China
- Czech Republic
- Egypt
- France
- Germany
- Great Britain
- Greece
- Italy
- Japan
- Kazakhstan
- Macao
- Malaysia
- Mexico
- Russia
- Spain
- Switzerland
- Thailand
- Taiwan
- Ukraine
- Uzbekistan
- USA
- Venezuela

== Results ==
Event	Gold		Silver		Bronze	
Solo details	Anna Udovik; Russia	87.416	Chloé Isaac; Canada	85.685	Ona Carbonell; Spain	84.827
Duet details	Elena Ternovskaya; Anna Udovik; Russia	86.541	Yukiko Inui; Mariko Sakai; Japan	84.713	Jo-Annie Fortin; Chloé Isaac; Canada	83.963
Team details	Russia	86.306	China	83.708	Japan	83.518
Free combination details	Russia	94.900	China	93.200	Greece	91.800
