= Mariya Chernyayeva =

Soviet synchronised swimmer (born 1966)

Personal information
- Nationality: Soviet Union
- Born: 14 February 1966 (age 60) Moscow, Soviet Union
- Height: 5 ft 8 in (173 cm)
- Weight: 58 kg (128 lb)

Sport
- Sport: Swimming
- Strokes: Synchronized swimming
- Coach: Zoya Barbier
Medal record
European Championships
Silver medal – second place	1987 Strasbourg	Women's team
Silver medal – second place	1989 Bonn	Women's duet
Silver medal – second place	1989 Bonn	Women's team
- Updated on 8 February 2015

Mariya Chernyayeva (born 14 February 1966) is a former synchronized swimmer from the Soviet Union. She competed in the women's duet competitions at the 1988 Summer Olympics gaining a 6th place.
