= Lisa Lieschke =

Australian synchronized swimmer

Personal information
- Full name: Lisa Barbara Lieschke
- Nationality: Australian
- Born: 6 October 1963 (age 62)
- Height: 1.60 m (5 ft 3 in)
- Weight: 48 kg (106 lb)

Sport
- Sport: Swimming
- Strokes: Synchronized swimming
Medal record
Commonwealth Games
Bronze medal – third place	1986 Edinburgh	Duet

Lisa Lieschke (born 6 October 1963) is an Australian former synchronized swimmer. She competed in the women's solo and women's duet competitions at the 1988 Summer Olympics. She also competed at the 1986 Commonwealth Games where she won a bronze medal in the duet event alongside Donna Rankin.
