= Synchronized swimming at the 1988 Summer Olympics =

Synchronised swimming at the Games of the XXIV Olympiad
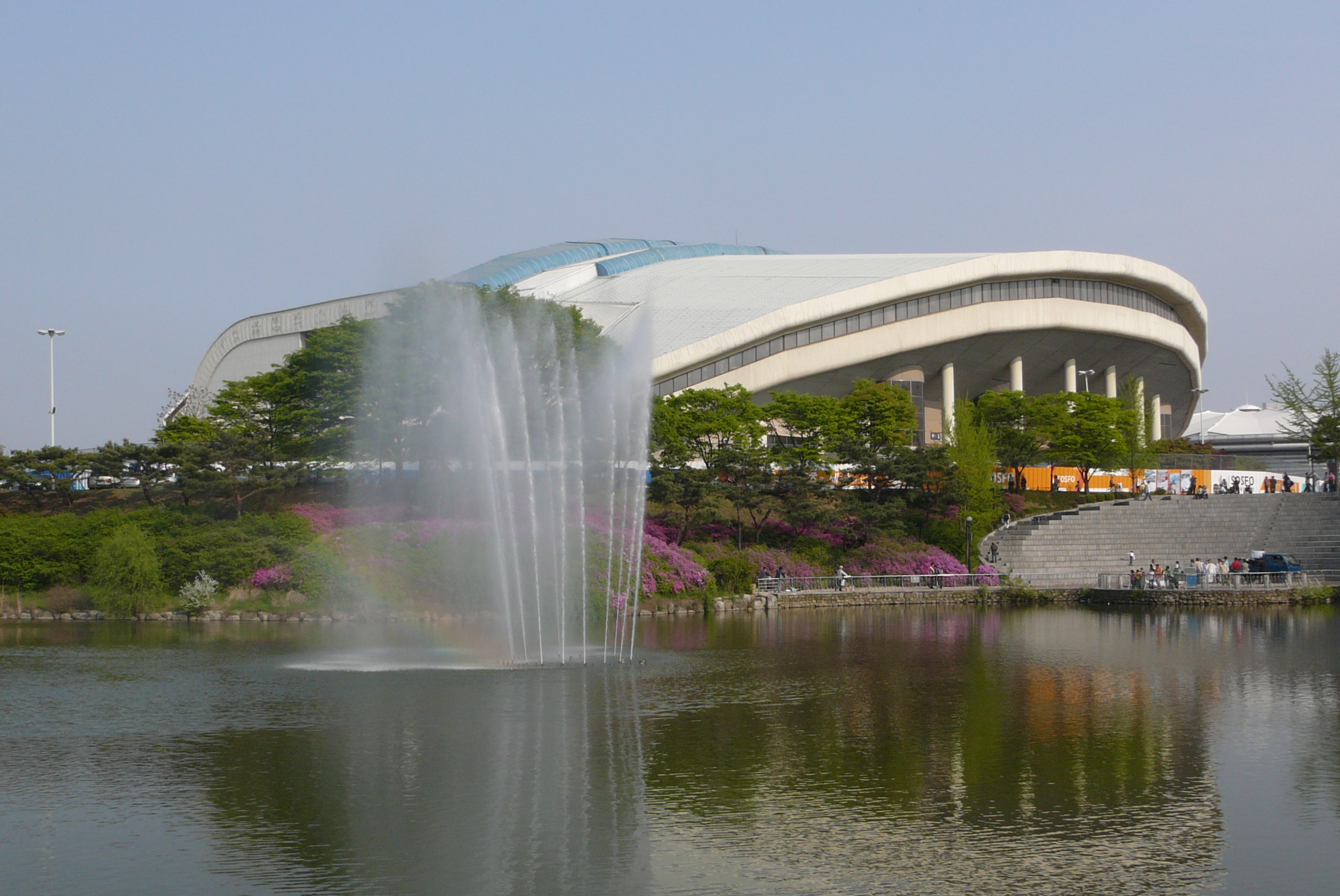
- Olympic swimming pool
- Venue: Jamsil Indoor Swimming Pool
- Dates: 26 September – 1 October 1988
- Competitors: 46 from 18 nations

At the 1988 Summer Olympics in Seoul, two events in synchronised swimming were contested, both for women only.

== Medal summary ==
| Event | Gold | Silver | Bronze |
|---|---|---|---|
| Solo | Carolyn Waldo; Canada | Tracie Ruiz; United States | Mikako Kotani; Japan |
| Duet | Canada; Michelle Cameron; Carolyn Waldo | United States; Karen Josephson; Sarah Josephson | Japan; Mikako Kotani; Miyako Tanaka |

== Medal table ==
| Rank | Nation | Gold | Silver | Bronze | Total |
|---|---|---|---|---|---|
| 1 | Canada | 2 | 0 | 0 | 2 |
| 2 | United States | 0 | 2 | 0 | 2 |
| 3 | Japan | 0 | 0 | 2 | 2 |
| Totals (3 entries) | | 2 | 2 | 2 | 6 |
