= Tatyana Titova (synchronised swimmer) =

Personal information
- Nationality: Soviet Union
- Born: 8 May 1967 (age 59) Moscow, Soviet Union
- Height: 5 ft 7 in (170 cm)
- Weight: 54 kg (119 lb)

Sport
- Sport: Swimming
- Strokes: Synchronised swimming
- Coach: Natalia Mendygaliyeva
Medal record
European Championships
Silver medal – second place	1987 Strasbourg	Women's team
Bronze medal – third place	1987 Strasbourg	Women's duet
- Updated on 8 February 2015

Tatyana Titova (Russian: Татьяна Титова; born 8 May 1967) is a former synchronised swimmer from the Soviet Union. She competed in the women's duet competitions at the 1988 Summer Olympics gaining a 6th place.

Titova was born in Moscow and graduated from the State Central Order of Lenin Institute of Physical Education. She married the renowned Soviet and Russian water polo player Dmitry Apanasenko and changed her last name to Apanasenko (Russian: Апанасенко).
