= Lourdes Candini =

Mexican synchronised swimmer (born 1966)

Personal information
- Nationality: Mexico
- Born: 11 February 1966 (age 60)
- Height: 5 ft 7 in (170 cm)
- Weight: 60 kg (130 lb)

Sport
- Sport: Swimming
- Strokes: Synchronized swimming
Medal record
Synchronized swimming
Representing Mexico
Pan American Games
Bronze medal – third place	1987 Indianapolis	Women's duet
- Updated on 8 February 2015

Lourdes Candini (born 11 February 1966) is a former synchronized swimmer from Mexico. She competed in the women's solo competition at both the 1984 and 1988 Summer Olympics.
