= Carolyn Waldo =

Canadian synchronized swimmer

Carolyn Waldo OC
Personal information
- Full name: Carolyn Jane Waldo
- Nationality: Canada
- Born: December 11, 1964 (age 61) Montreal, Quebec, Canada
- Height: 1.70 m (5 ft 7 in)
- Weight: 56 kg (123 lb)

Sport
- Sport: Swimming
- Strokes: Synchronised swimming
- Club: Calgary Aquabelles
Medal record
Synchronised swimming
Representing Canada
Olympic Games
Gold medal – first place	1988 Seoul	Women's solo
Gold medal – first place	1988 Seoul	Women's duet
Silver medal – second place	1984 Los Angeles	Women's solo
World Championships
Gold medal – first place	1986 Madrid	Solo
Gold medal – first place	1986 Madrid	Duet
Gold medal – first place	1986 Madrid	Team

Carolyn Jane Waldo, OC (born December 11, 1964, in Montreal, Quebec) is a Canadian former synchronized swimmer and broadcaster.

== Career ==
Waldo is best known for winning two gold medals at the 1988 Summer Olympics, in the Women's Solo and in the Women's Duet with Michelle Cameron. Waldo won at the 1985 Rome and Spanish Opens, 1985 FINA World Cup, 1986 Spanish Open, 1986 Commonwealth Games, 1986 World Championships, 1987 Pan Pacific Championships and the 1987 FINA World Cup. Waldo won a silver medal in the 1984 Summer Olympics in Los Angeles. Waldo won the Olympic title in the solo and duet competitions at the 1988 Summer Olympics in Seoul, South Korea, making her the Canadian female to win two gold medals at one Olympic Games.

An Officer of the Order of Canada, a four-time winner of the Velma Springstead Trophy, Waldo retired in 1988 and worked as a sportscaster for the television station CJOH in Ottawa, Ontario, until being laid off on November 17, 2015.

During her competitive career, she was sponsored by Sears Canada.

== See also ==
- List of members of the International Swimming Hall of Fame
