= Miyako Tanaka =

Japanese synchronized swimmer

Miyako Tanaka Oulevey
Personal information
- Nationality: Japan
- Born: 20 February 1967 (age 59)
- Height: 1.63 m (5 ft 4 in)
- Weight: 52 kg (115 lb)

Sport
- Sport: Swimming
- Strokes: Synchronized swimming
Medal record
Representing Japan
Olympic Games
Bronze medal – third place	1988 Seoul	Women's duet
World Championships
Bronze medal – third place	1986 Madrid	Women's duet
Bronze medal – third place	1991 Perth	Women's solo
- Updated on 30 May 2024

Miyako Tanaka (田中 京, Tanaka Miyako; born 20 February 1967) is a former synchronized swimmer from Japan who competed in the 1988 Summer Olympics.

Miyako Tanaka-Oulevey is a Japanese sports psychologist, a PhD holder in system design and management, a certified mental training consultant in sports (CMTCS), public speaker, TV sports commentator, author, and a 1988 Seoul Olympics bronze medalist in synchronized swimming, duet.

While assisting the US synchronized swimming Olympic head coach for 4 years in the US, she earned a master's in sports management specializing in sports psychology. Her academically specialized fields are performance enhancement, career transition, and stress management.

She is the author of more than 40 books (including joint works), and routinely gives lectures, seminars or workshops at universities and companies. Olympic and professional Japanese athletes regularly consult with her regarding performance enhancement and career transition. She is a mental coach for Japan's female national soccer team and the male Paralympic wheelchair basketball team.

She is also a member of the IOC marketing committee and a member of the certification committee of the Japanese society of sports psychology.

Miyako currently lives with her husband and 2 children in Tokyo, Japan.
