= Mladen Kapor =

Yugoslav swimmer

Personal information
- Born: 12 November 1966 (age 59)

Sport
- Sport: Swimming

Mladen Kapor (born 12 November 1966) is a Yugoslav swimmer. He competed in two events at the 1992 Summer Olympics.
