= Anne Capron =

French synchronized swimmer

Personal information
- Nationality: France
- Born: 18 February 1969 (age 57) Paris, France
- Height: 5 ft 5 in (165 cm)
- Weight: 54 kg (119 lb)

Sport
- Sport: Swimming
- Strokes: Synchronized swimming
- Club: C.N.O
Medal record
Representing France
Synchronized swimming
European Championships
Silver medal – second place	1991 Athens	duet
Bronze medal – third place	1991 Athens	solo

Anne Capron (born 18 February 1969) is a former synchronized swimmer from France. She competed in both the women's solo and the women's duet competitions at the 1988 and 1992 Summer Olympics.

== International competitions ==
Year	Competition	Venue	Position	Event	Notes
1988	Olympic Games	Seoul, South Korea	15th (qf)	solo	
1988	Olympic Games	Seoul, South Korea	4th	duet	
1991	European Championships	Athens, Greece	3rd	solo	
1991	European Championships	Athens, Greece	2nd	duet	
1992	Olympic Games	Barcelona, Spain	5th	solo	
1992	Olympic Games	Barcelona, Spain	5th	duet	
qf = qualifying figures
