= Laila Vakil =

British synchronised swimmer

Personal information
- Nationality: United Kingdom
- Born: 21 March 1974 (age 52) North Camp, England
- Height: 1.65 m (5 ft 5 in)
- Weight: 49 kg (108 lb)

Sport
- Sport: Swimming
- Strokes: Synchronised swimming
- Club: Rushmoor Synchro
Medal record
Synchronised swimming
Representing Great Britain
European Championships
Bronze medal – third place	1993 Sheffield	Duet
Representing England
Commonwealth Games
Silver medal – second place	1994 Victoria	Duet
- Updated on 27 February 2015

Laila Vakil (born 21 March 1974) is a former synchronised swimmer from Great Britain. She competed in both the women's solo and the women's duet competitions at the 1992 Summer Olympics.
