= Nuria Ayala =

Spanish synchronized swimmer

Personal information
- Full name: Nuria Ayala Mitjavila
- Nationality: Spain
- Born: 28 March 1970 (age 56) Barcelona, Spain
- Height: 1.66 m (5 ft 5 in)
- Weight: 50 kg (110 lb)

Sport
- Sport: Swimming
- Strokes: Synchronized swimming
- Club: CN Kallipolis
- Updated on 16 November 2014

Nuria Ayala (born 28 March 1970) is a former synchronized swimmer from Spain. She competed in both the 1988 and 1992 Summer Olympics.
