= Michelle Cameron =

Canadian synchronized swimmer

Michelle Cameron CM
Personal information
- Born: December 28, 1962 (age 63) Calgary, Alberta, Canada
- Height: 1.74 m (5 ft 9 in)
- Weight: 59 kg (130 lb)

Sport
- Country: Canada
- Sport: Swimming
- Strokes: Synchronised swimming
- Club: Calgary Aquabelles
Medal record
Synchronised swimming
Representing Canada
Olympic Games
| Gold medal – first place | 1988 Seoul | Women's duet |
World Aquatics Championships
| Gold medal – first place | 1986 Madrid | Women's duet |
| Gold medal – first place | 1986 Madrid | Team |
Commonwealth Games
| Gold medal – first place | 1986 Edinburgh | Women's duet |
- Updated on 22 May 2017

Michelle A. Cameron-Coulter, CM (born December 28, 1962, in Calgary, Alberta) is a retired Canadian Olympic synchronized swimmer, and former world champion.

== Career ==
Cameron began synchronized swimming at age 13, and she joined the Calgary Aquabelles in 1976. In 1985 she was paired with swimming partner Carolyn Waldo.

The pair found great success, winning most major duet competitions including the 1985 Rome and Spanish Opens, 1986 Commonwealth Games, 1986 World Aquatics Championships and the 1987 Pan Pacific Championships. Cameron's most notable achievement is earning a gold medal in the women's duet event at the 1988 Summer Olympics. She was the first person from the province of Alberta to win an Olympic gold medal.

== Honours ==
In 1988, she was made a Member of the Order of Canada. In 1991, she was inducted into Canada's Sports Hall of Fame. In 2000, she was inducted into the International Swimming Hall of Fame.

== See also ==
- List of members of the International Swimming Hall of Fame
