= Tan Min =

Chinese synchronized swimmer

Personal information
- Nationality: China
- Born: 25 August 1972 (age 53) Fuling County, Sichuan (now Fuling District, Chongqing)
- Height: 5 ft 4 in (163 cm)
- Weight: 54 kg (119 lb)

Sport
- Sport: Swimming
- Strokes: Synchronized swimming
- Updated on 8 February 2015

Tan Min (Chinese: 谭敏; born 25 August 1972) is a former synchronized swimmer from China. She competed in both the 1988 and 1992 Summer Olympics.
