= Eva López (synchronized swimmer) =

Spanish synchronized swimmer

Personal information
- Nationality: Spain
- Born: 27 November 1969 (age 56) Barcelona, Spain
- Height: 1.68 m (5 ft 6 in)
- Weight: 50 kg (110 lb)

Sport
- Sport: Swimming
- Strokes: Synchronized swimming
- Club: CN Kallipolis
- Updated on 16 November 2014

Eva López (born 27 November 1969) is a former synchronized swimmer from Spain. She competed in the women's solo competition at both the 1988 and 1992 Summer Olympics.
