= Celeste Ferraris =

Australian synchronized swimmer

Personal information
- Full name: Celeste Deirdre Ferraris
- Nationality: Australia

Sport
- Sport: Swimming
- Strokes: Synchronized swimming
Medal record
Synchronised swimming
Commonwealth Games
Bronze medal – third place	1994 Victoria BC	Solo
Bronze medal – third place	1994 Victoria BC	Duet

Celeste Deirdre Ferraris is a former synchronized swimmer from Australia. She competed in the women's solo and women's duet competitions at the 1992 Summer Olympics.
