= Semon Rohloff =

Australian synchronized swimmer

Personal information
- Nationality: Australia
- Born: 19 April 1970 (age 56)
- Height: 1.68 m (5 ft 6 in)
- Weight: 61 kg (134 lb)

Sport
- Sport: Swimming
- Strokes: Synchronized swimming
Medal record
Representing Australia
Commonwealth Games
Bronze medal – third place	1990 Auckland	Solo
Bronze medal – third place	1990 Auckland	Duet
- Updated on 16 November 2014

Semon Elke Rohloff (born 19 April 1970) is a former synchronized swimmer from Australia. She competed in both the women's solo and women's duet competitions at the 1988 and 1992 Summer Olympics.
