= Basketball at the 1988 Summer Olympics – Women's team rosters =

Eight women's teams competed in basketball at the 1988 Summer Olympics.

== Group A ==
=== Australia ===
The following is the Australia roster in the women's basketball tournament of the 1988 Summer Olympics.

Australia women's national basketball team – 1988 Summer Olympics roster
Players
Coaches

Pos.	No.	Name	Age – Date of birth	Height	Club	Ctr.
	4	Robyn Maher	28 – 6 October 1959	1.78 m (5 ft 10 in)
G	5	Sandy Brondello	20 – 20 August 1968	1.70 m (5 ft 7 in)
	6	Jenny Cheesman	30 – 2 November 1957
PG	7	Michele Timms	23 – 28 June 1965	1.64 m (5 ft 5 in)
	8	Donna Brown	24 – 12 October 1963
	9	Patricia Mickan	31 – 12 March 1957
	10	Julie Nykiel	19 – 13 December 1968
	11	Debbie Slimmon	21 – 3 April 1967
	12	Marina Moffa	24 – 17 April 1964
	13	Karen Dalton	27 – 2 January 1961
	14	Shelley Sandie	19 – 22 January 1969
	15	Maree White	28 – 7 June 1960

Head coach

Robbie Cadee

Legend

- Club – describes last
  club before the tournament
- Age – describes age
  on 17 September 1988

=== Bulgaria ===
The following is the Bulgaria roster in the women's basketball tournament of the 1988 Summer Olympics.

Bulgaria women's national basketball team – 1988 Summer Olympics roster
Players
Coaches

Pos.	No.	Name	Age – Date of birth	Height	Club	Ctr.
	4	Nina Khadzhiyankova	25 – 18 September 1963			(France)
	5	Larisa Spasova	28 – 22 August 1960			(Bulgaria)
	6	Mariana Naydenova	26 – 11 February 1962
	7	Tsonka Vaysilova	21 – 20 February 1967			(Bulgaria)
	8	Vanya Dermendzhieva	29 – 3 December 1958			(West Germany)
	9	Sonya Dragomirova	27 – 7 September 1961			(Bulgaria)
	10	Radmila Vasileva	24 – 5 January 1964			(Bulgaria)
	11	Kostadinka Radkova	26 – 27 June 1962			(France)
	12	Evladiya Slavcheva-Stefanova	26 – 25 February 1962			(Bulgaria)
	13	Madlena Staneva	25 – 1 June 1963			(France)
C	14	Polina Tzekova	20 – 30 April 1968	1.95 m (6 ft 5 in)	WBC Lokomotiv Sofia	(Bulgaria)
	15	Mariana Chobanova	23 – 13 September 1965			(Portugal)

Legend

- Club – describes last
  club before the tournament
- Age – describes age
  on 17 September 1988

=== South Korea ===
The following is the South Korea roster in the women's basketball tournament of the 1988 Summer Olympics.

South Korea women's national basketball team – 1988 Summer Olympics roster
Players
Coaches

Pos.	No.	Name	Age – Date of birth	Height	Club	Ctr.
	4	Lee Kum-jin	23 – 1 February 1965
	5	Kim Mal-lyun	35 – 28 June 1953
	6	Choi Kyung-hee	22 – 25 February 1966
	7	Lee Hyung-sook	23 – 24 December 1964
	8	Park Chan-mi	24 – 22 May 1964
	9	Woo Eun-kyung	26 – 19 August 1962
	10	Jeong Mi-kyeong	22 – 23 December 1965
	11	Kim Hwa-soon	26 – 12 April 1962
	12	Kim Hye-youn	28 – 3 June 1960
	13	Park Chan-sook	29 – 3 June 1959
	14	Sung Jung-a	22 – 25 December 1965
	15	Cho Mun-chu	24 – 29 July 1964

Legend

- Club – describes last
  club before the tournament
- Age – describes age
  on 17 September 1988

=== Soviet Union ===
The following is the Soviet Union roster in the women's basketball tournament of the 1988 Summer Olympics.

Soviet Union women's national basketball team – 1988 Summer Olympics roster
Players
Coaches

Pos.	No.	Name	Age – Date of birth	Height	Club	Ctr.
	4	Olga Yevkova	23 – 15 July 1965
	5	Irina Gerlits	22 – 29 April 1966
	6	Olesya Barel	28 – 9 February 1960			(Hungary)
G	7	Irina Sumnikova	23 – 15 October 1964	1.70 m (5 ft 7 in)		(Soviet Union)
	8	Olga Buryakina	30 – 17 March 1958
	9	Olga Yakovleva	24 – 15 December 1963
	10	Irina Minkh	24 – 16 April 1964			(Soviet Union)
	11	Aleksandra Leonova	24 – 4 September 1964
C	12	Yelena Khudashova	23 – 10 July 1965	1.95 m (6 ft 5 in)		(Italy)
	13	Vitalija Tuomaitė	23 – 22 November 1964
C	14	Natalya Zasulskaya	19 – 28 May 1969	1.91 m (6 ft 3 in)		(Soviet Union)
	15	Galina Savitskaya	27 – 13 July 1961			(Spain)

Head coach

Leonid Yachmenev

Legend

- Club – describes last
  club before the tournament
- Age – describes age
  on 17 September 1988

== Group B ==
=== China ===
The following is the China roster in the women's basketball tournament of the 1988 Summer Olympics.

China women's national basketball team – 1988 Summer Olympics roster
Players
Coaches

Pos.	No.	Name	Age – Date of birth	Height	Club	Ctr.
	4	Han Qingling	27 – 16 December 1960
	5	Ling Guang	22 – 1 March 1966
	6	Li Xiaoqin	26 – 7 December 1961
	7	Zhao Wei	25 – 6 June 1963
	8	Zhang Taohua	18 – 10 March 1970
	9	Zhan Shuping	24 – 24 April 1964
	10	Peng Ping	21 – 14 January 1967
C	11	Zheng Haixia	21 – 7 March 1967
PG	12	Cong Xuedi	25 – 13 May 1963	1.66 m (5 ft 5 in)
	13	Xue Cuilan	25 – 30 April 1963
	14	Liu Qing	24 – 6 August 1964
	15	Xu Chunmei	22 – 22 March 1966

Legend

- Club – describes last
  club before the tournament
- Age – describes age
  on 17 September 1988

=== Czechoslovakia ===
The following is the Czechoslovakia roster in the women's basketball tournament of the 1988 Summer Olympics.

Czechoslovakia women's national basketball team – 1988 Summer Olympics roster
Players
Coaches

Pos.	No.	Name	Age – Date of birth	Height	Club	Ctr.
	4	Svatava Kysilková	23 – 29 December 1964		Sparta ČKD Praha	(Czechoslovakia)
	5	Alena Kašová	28 – 6 March 1960		Slovan CHZJD Bratislava	(Czechoslovakia)
	6	Eva Kalužáková	23 – 3 May 1965		Sparta ČKD Praha	(Czechoslovakia)
	7	Ivana Nováková	23 – 16 July 1965		Slavia VŠ Praha	(Czechoslovakia)
	8	Zuzana Hájková	25 – 15 January 1963		Slavia VŠ Praha	(Czechoslovakia)
	9	Anna Janoštinová	20 – 6 April 1968		Slavia PF Banská Bystrica	(Czechoslovakia)
	10	Zora Brziaková	24 – 14 March 1964		Sparta ČKD Praha	(Czechoslovakia)
	11	Hana Zarevúcká	27 – 3 March 1961		Slavia VŠ Praha	(Czechoslovakia)
	12	Erika Dobrovičová-Buriánová	21 – 10 September 1967		Slavia PF Banská Bystrica	(Czechoslovakia)
	13	Eva Křížová	21 – 20 October 1966		Slavia VŠ Praha	(Czechoslovakia)
	14	Irma Valová	23 – 26 July 1965		Sparta ČKD Praha	(Czechoslovakia)
	15	Eva Berková	22 – 23 October 1965		Racing Club de France	(France)

Legend

- Club – describes last
  club before the tournament
- Age – describes age
  on 17 September 1988

=== United States ===
The following is the United States roster in the women's basketball tournament of the 1988 Summer Olympics.

United States women's national basketball team – 1988 Summer Olympics roster
Players
Coaches

Pos.	No.	Name	Age – Date of birth	Height	Club	Ctr.
G	4	Teresa Edwards	24 – 19 July 1964	1.75 m (5 ft 9 in)		(France)
PG	5	Kamie Ethridge	24 – 21 April 1964	1.65 m (5 ft 5 in)
F/C	6	Cindy Brown	23 – 16 March 1965	1.88 m (6 ft 2 in)		(France)
C	7	Anne Donovan	26 – 1 November 1961	2.03 m (6 ft 8 in)
PG	8	Teresa Weatherspoon	22 – 8 December 1965			(Italy)
F	9	Bridgette Gordon	21 – 27 April 1967	1.83 m (6 ft 0 in)		(Turkey)
F	10	Vicky Bullett	20 – 4 October 1967	1.91 m (6 ft 3 in)		(Italy)
F	11	Andrea Lloyd-Curry	23 – 2 September 1965	1.88 m (6 ft 2 in)		(Italy)
F	12	Katrina McClain Johnson	23 – 19 September 1965	1.85 m (6 ft 1 in)		(Turkey)
F/C	13	Jennifer Gillom	24 – 13 June 1964	1.91 m (6 ft 3 in)		(Turkey)
G	14	Cynthia Cooper-Dyke	25 – 14 April 1963	1.78 m (5 ft 10 in)	CD CREF	(Spain)
	15	Suzie McConnell-Serio	22 – 29 July 1966		Penn State Lady Lions	(United States)

Head coach

Kay Yow

Legend

- Club – describes last
  club before the tournament
- Age – describes age
  on 17 September 1988

=== Yugoslavia ===
The following is the Yugoslavia roster in the women's basketball tournament of the 1988 Summer Olympics.

Yugoslavia women's national basketball team – 1988 Summer Olympics roster
Players
Coaches

Pos.	No.	Name	Age – Date of birth	Height	Club	Ctr.
SG	4	Stojna Vangelovska	24 – 5 February 1964	1.72 m (5 ft 8 in)	ŽKD Ježica	(Socialist Federal Republic of Yugoslavia)
SG	5	Mara Lakić	25 – 18 August 1963	1.70 m (5 ft 7 in)	ŽKK Jedinstvo Tuzla	(Socialist Federal Republic of Yugoslavia)
C	6	Žana Lelas	18 – 28 May 1970	1.88 m (6 ft 2 in)	ŽKK Elemes	(Socialist Federal Republic of Yugoslavia)
SG	7	Eleonora Vild	19 – 9 June 1969	1.80 m (5 ft 11 in)	SG Aschaffenburg-Mainhausen	(Germany)
C	8	Kornelija Kvesić	25 – 25 August 1963	1.88 m (6 ft 2 in)	ŽKK Elemes	(Socialist Federal Republic of Yugoslavia)
SG	9	Danira Nakić	19 – 22 July 1969	1.84 m (6 ft 0 in)	ŽKK Elemes	(Socialist Federal Republic of Yugoslavia)
C	10	Slađana Golić	28 – 12 February 1960	1.89 m (6 ft 2 in)	ŽKK Vršac	(Socialist Federal Republic of Yugoslavia)
C	11	Polona Dornik	25 – 20 November 1962	1.96 m (6 ft 5 in)	ŽKD Ježica	(Socialist Federal Republic of Yugoslavia)
C	12	Razija Mujanović	21 – 15 April 1967	2.02 m (6 ft 8 in)	ŽKK Jedinstvo Tuzla	(Socialist Federal Republic of Yugoslavia)
G	13	Vesna Bajkuša	20 – 21 May 1968	1.76 m (5 ft 9 in)	ŽKK Željezničar	(Socialist Federal Republic of Yugoslavia)
SG	14	Anđelija Arbutina	21 – 29 March 1967	1.78 m (5 ft 10 in)	ŽKK Crvena zvezda	(Socialist Federal Republic of Yugoslavia)
C	15	Bojana Milošević	22 – 29 November 1965	1.88 m (6 ft 2 in)	ŽKK Crvena zvezda	(Socialist Federal Republic of Yugoslavia)

Head coach

Milan Vasojević

Legend

- Club – describes last
  club before the tournament
- Age – describes age
  on 17 September 1988
