= Basketball at the 1988 Summer Olympics =

12th Olympic Basketball Tournament
- Seoul 1988

Tournament details
- Olympics: 1988 Summer Olympics
- Host nation: South Korea
- City: Seoul
- Duration: September 17 – September 30, 1988

Men's tournament
- Teams: 12
Medals
| Gold medalists | Soviet Union |
| Silver medalists | Yugoslavia |
| Bronze medalists | United States |

Women's tournament
- Teams: 8
Medals
| Gold medalists | United States |
| Silver medalists | Yugoslavia |
| Bronze medalists | Soviet Union |

Tournaments
| ← Los Angeles 1984 | Barcelona 1992 → |

Basketball at the 1988 Summer Olympics was the twelfth appearance of the sport of basketball as an official Olympic medal event. It took place at the Jamsil Gymnasium in Seoul, South Korea from 17 September to 30 September 1988. The United States won the gold medal in the women's competition, repeating their performance from the 1984 tournament.

In the men's tournament, the Soviet Union won its second gold medal in the team's history for this event. That team included a large percentage of players from the Baltic states: Sabonis, Chomičius, Kurtinaitis and Marčiulionis from Lithuania, Miglinieks from Latvia and Tiit Sokk from Estonia.

This was the last Olympic basketball tournament where NBA players were not allowed to participate; FIBA voted in a rule change in 1989 that lifted that restriction, leading to the dominance of 1992's Dream Team.

== Medalists ==
| Event | Gold | Silver | Bronze |
|---|---|---|---|
| Men's | Soviet Union Aleksandr Volkov; Tiit Sokk; Sergei Tarakanov; Šarūnas Marčiulionis; Igors Miglinieks; Valeri Tikhonenko; Rimas Kurtinaitis; Arvydas Sabonis; Viktor Pankrashkin; Valdemaras Chomičius; Aleksandr Belostennyi; Valeri Goborov | Yugoslavia Dražen Petrović; Zdravko Radulović; Zoran Čutura; Toni Kukoč; Žarko Paspalj; Željko Obradović; Jure Zdovc; Stojko Vranković; Vlade Divac; Franjo Arapović; Dino Rađa; Danko Cvjetićanin | United States Mitch Richmond; Charles Smith IV; Bimbo Coles; Hersey Hawkins; Jeff Grayer; Charles D. Smith; Willie Anderson; Stacey Augmon; Dan Majerle; Danny Manning; J. R. Reid; David Robinson |
| Women's | United States Teresa Edwards; Kamie Ethridge; Cynthia Brown; Anne Donovan; Teresa Weatherspoon; Bridgette Gordon; Victoria Bullett; Andrea Lloyd; Katrina McClain; Jennifer Gillom; Cynthia Cooper; Suzanne McConnell | Yugoslavia Stojna Vangelovska; Mara Lakić; Žana Lelas; Eleonora Vild; Kornelija Kvesić; Danira Nakić; Slađana Golić; Polona Dornik; Razija Mujanović; Vesna Bajkuša; Anđelija Arbutina; Bojana Milošević | Soviet Union Olga Yevkova; Irina Gerlits; Olesya Barel; Irina Sumnikova; Olga Buryakina; Olga Yakovleva; Irina Minkh; Aleksandra Leonova; Yelena Khudashova; Vitalija Tuomaitė; Natalya Zasulskaya; Galina Savitskaya |

== Qualification ==
A NOC could enter one men's team with 12 players and one women's team with 12 players. For both tournaments, automatic qualifications were granted to the host country and the winners from the previous edition. For the men's tournament, the remaining teams were decided by the continental championships in Asia, Oceania, Africa and Americas and European qualifying tournament. Champions of Asia and Oceania, top two teams from Africa and top three from Americas earned direct qualification. The last three berths were allocated from the European qualifying tournament, held in the Netherlands, two months before Olympics tournament. For the women's tournament, qualification was decided by a tournament held in Kuala Lumpur, Malaysia, where the top six teams earned a spot.

=== Men ===
| Africa | Americas | Asia | Europe | Oceania | Automatic qualifiers |
|---|---|---|---|---|---|
| Central African Republic; Egypt | Puerto Rico; Brazil; Canada | China | Soviet Union; Yugoslavia; Spain | Australia | United States – Olympic Champions; South Korea – Olympic hosts |

=== Women ===
| Asia | Europe | Oceania | Automatic qualifiers |
|---|---|---|---|
| China | Soviet Union; Yugoslavia; Czechoslovakia; Bulgaria | Australia | United States – Olympic Champions; South Korea – Olympic hosts |

== Format ==
Men's tournament:

- Two groups of six teams are formed, where the top four from each group advance to the knockout stage.
- Fifth and sixth places from each group form an additional bracket to decide 9th–12th places in the final ranking.
- In the quarterfinals, the match ups are as follows: A1 vs. B4, A2 vs. B3, A3 vs. B2 and A4 vs. B1.
  - The four teams eliminated from the quarterfinals form an additional bracket to decide 5th–8th places in the final ranking.
- The winning teams from the quarterfinals meet in the semifinals as follows: A1/B4 vs. A3/B2 and A2/B3 vs. A4/B1.
- The winning teams from the semifinals contest the gold medal. The losing teams contest the bronze.

Women's tournament:

- Two groups of four teams are formed, where the top two teams from each group advance to the knockout stage.
- Third and fourth places from each group form an additional bracket to decide 5th–8th places in the final ranking.
- In the semifinals, the match ups are as follows: A1 vs. B2, A2 vs. B1.
- The winning teams from the semifinals contest the gold medal. The losing teams contest the bronze.

Tie-breaking criteria:

1. Head to head results
2. Goal average (not the goal difference) between the tied teams
3. Goal average of the tied teams for all teams in its group

== Men's tournament ==
=== Preliminary round ===
The top four places in each of the preliminary round groups advanced to the eight team, single-elimination knockout stage, where Group A teams would meet Group B teams. Hosts Korea could not advance, finishing at the bottom of their group. The other Asia representative, China, met the same fate, together with the two African teams, Egypt and Central African Republic.

==== Group A ====
| Pos | Team | Pld | W | L | PF | PA | PD | Pts | Qualification |
|---|---|---|---|---|---|---|---|---|---|
| 1 | Yugoslavia | 5 | 4 | 1 | 468 | 384 | +84 | 9 (Note: Head-to-head record: Yugoslavia 1–0 Soviet Union) | Quarterfinals |
| 2 | Soviet Union | 5 | 4 | 1 | 460 | 393 | +67 | 9 | Quarterfinals |
| 3 | Australia | 5 | 3 | 2 | 429 | 408 | +21 | 8 (Note: Head-to-head record: Australia 1–0 Puerto Rico) | Quarterfinals |
| 4 | Puerto Rico | 5 | 3 | 2 | 382 | 387 | −5 | 8 | Quarterfinals |
| 5 | Central African Republic | 5 | 1 | 4 | 346 | 436 | −90 | 6 | 9th–12th classification round |
| 6 | South Korea (H) | 5 | 0 | 5 | 384 | 461 | −77 | 5 | 9th–12th classification round |

Source: FIBA archive
Rules for classification: 1) points; 2) head-to-head points; 3) head-to-head goal average; 4) head-to-head number of points scored.
(H) Hosts

==== Group B ====
| Pos | Team | Pld | W | L | PF | PA | PD | Pts | Qualification |
|---|---|---|---|---|---|---|---|---|---|
| 1 | United States | 5 | 5 | 0 | 485 | 302 | +183 | 10 | Quarterfinals |
| 2 | Spain | 5 | 4 | 1 | 484 | 435 | +49 | 9 | Quarterfinals |
| 3 | Brazil | 5 | 3 | 2 | 590 | 522 | +68 | 8 | Quarterfinals |
| 4 | Canada | 5 | 2 | 3 | 479 | 455 | +24 | 7 | Quarterfinals |
| 5 | China | 5 | 1 | 4 | 433 | 527 | −94 | 6 | 9th–12th classification round |
| 6 | Egypt | 5 | 0 | 5 | 338 | 568 | −230 | 5 | 9th–12th classification round |

Source: FIBA archive
Rules for classification: 1) points; 2) head-to-head points; 3) head-to-head goal average; 4) head-to-head number of points scored.

=== Knockout stage ===
==== Championship bracket ====
Quarter-finals
September 26
(A1) Yugoslavia | 95
(B4) Canada | 73
September 26
(B2) Spain | 74
(A3) Australia | 77
September 26
(B1) United States | 94
(A4) Puerto Rico | 57
September 26
(A2) Soviet Union | 110
(B3) Brazil | 105

Semi-finals
September 28
(A1) Yugoslavia | 91
(A3) Australia | 70
September 28
(B1) United States | 76
(A2) Soviet Union | 82

Gold medal match
September 30
(A1) Yugoslavia | 63
(A2) Soviet Union | 76
Third place
September 29
(A3) Australia | 49
(B1) United States | 78

=== Statistical leaders ===
| Statistic | Name | Total | Per game/Pct. |
|---|---|---|---|
| Points | (Brazil) Oscar Schmidt | 338 | 42.2 |
| Rebounds | (Lithuania) Arvydas Sabonis | 78 | 11.1 |
| Assists | (Spain) Ignacio Solozábal | 33 | 4.1 |
| Assists | (Brazil) Maury de Souza | 33 | 4.1 |
| Steals | (South Korea) Hur Jae | 23 | 3.3 |
| Blocks | (Socialist Federal Republic of Yugoslavia) Stojko Vranković | 28 | 3.5 |
| 3-point field goals | (Brazil) Oscar Schmidt | 35 | .556 |
| Free throws | (Brazil) Oscar Schmidt | 89 | .918 |

== Women's tournament ==
=== Preliminary round ===
The first two places in each of the preliminary round groups advanced to the semifinals, where Group A teams would meet Group B teams. Like their male counterparts, the Korea women's team did not manage to advance to the knockout stage and ended up battling for 5th place against the other Asian representative, China and two European teams, Bulgaria and Czechoslovakia.

==== Group A ====
| Pos | Team | Pld | W | L | PF | PA | PD | Pts | Qualification |
|---|---|---|---|---|---|---|---|---|---|
| 1 | Australia | 3 | 2 | 1 | 178 | 196 | −18 | 5 (Note: Head-to-head record: Australia 1–0 Soviet Union) | Semifinals |
| 2 | Soviet Union | 3 | 2 | 1 | 208 | 188 | +20 | 5 | Semifinals |
| 3 | Bulgaria | 3 | 1 | 2 | 217 | 241 | −24 | 4 (Note: Head-to-head record: Bulgaria 1–0 South Korea) | Classification round |
| 4 | South Korea (H) | 3 | 1 | 2 | 244 | 222 | +22 | 4 | Classification round |

Source: FIBA
Rules for classification: 1) points; 2) head-to-head points; 3) head-to-head goal average; 4) head-to-head number of points scored.
(H) Hosts

==== Group B ====
| Pos | Team | Pld | W | L | PF | PA | PD | Pts | Qualification |
|---|---|---|---|---|---|---|---|---|---|
| 1 | United States | 3 | 3 | 0 | 282 | 234 | +48 | 6 | Semifinals |
| 2 | Yugoslavia | 3 | 2 | 1 | 199 | 211 | −12 | 5 | Semifinals |
| 3 | China | 3 | 1 | 2 | 200 | 214 | −14 | 4 | Classification round |
| 4 | Czechoslovakia | 3 | 0 | 3 | 202 | 224 | −22 | 3 | Classification round |

Source: FIBA
Rules for classification: 1) points; 2) head-to-head points; 3) head-to-head goal average; 4) head-to-head number of points scored.

=== Knockout stage ===
==== Championship bracket ====
Semifinals (September 27)
A1 | Australia | 56
B2 | Yugoslavia | 57
B1 | United States | 102
A2 | Soviet Union | 88

Gold medal (September 29)
B2 | Yugoslavia | 70
B1 | United States | 77
Bronze medal (September 28)
A1 | Australia | 53
A2 | Soviet Union | 68

=== Statistical leaders ===
| Statistic | Name | Total | Per game/Pct. |
|---|---|---|---|
| Points | (South Korea) Choi Kyung-hee | 98 | 19.6 |
| Points | (Bulgaria) Evladiya Slavcheva-Stefanova | 98 | 19.6 |
| Rebounds | (United States) Katrina McClain | 52 | 10.4 |
| Assists | (United States) Teresa Edwards | 17 | 3.4 |
| Assists | (Australia) Robyn Maher | 17 | 3.4 |
| Steals | (Czechoslovakia) Ivana Nováková | 15 | 3 |
| Blocks | (Czechoslovakia) Erika Dobrovičová-Buriánová | 12 | 2.4 |
| Blocks | (Socialist Federal Republic of Yugoslavia) Polona Dornik | 12 | 2.4 |
| 3-point field goals | (South Korea) Lee Kum-jin | 20 | .645 |
| Free throws | (Socialist Federal Republic of Yugoslavia) Danira Nakić | 33 | .846 |

== Final standings ==
| Rank | Men | | | | Women | | | |
| Rank | Team | Pld | W | L | Team | Pld | W | L |
|---|---|---|---|---|---|---|---|---|
| 1st place, gold medalist(s) | Soviet Union | 8 | 7 | 1 | United States | 5 | 5 | 0 |
| 2nd place, silver medalist(s) | Yugoslavia | 8 | 6 | 2 | Yugoslavia | 5 | 3 | 2 |
| 3rd place, bronze medalist(s) | United States | 8 | 7 | 1 | Soviet Union | 5 | 3 | 2 |
| 4th | Australia | 8 | 4 | 4 | Australia | 5 | 2 | 3 |
| Eliminated in the quarterfinals | | | | | Eliminated in the group round | | | |
| 5th | Brazil | 8 | 5 | 3 | Bulgaria | 5 | 3 | 2 |
| 6th | Canada | 8 | 3 | 5 | China | 5 | 2 | 3 |
| 7th | Puerto Rico | 8 | 4 | 4 | South Korea | 5 | 2 | 3 |
| 8th | Spain | 8 | 4 | 4 | Czechoslovakia | 5 | 0 | 5 |
Eliminated in the group round
| 9th | South Korea | 7 | 2 | 5 | | | | |
| 10th | Central African Republic | 7 | 2 | 5 | | | | |
| 11th | China | 7 | 2 | 5 | | | | |
| 12th | Egypt | 7 | 0 | 7 | | | | |
