= Yugoslavia at the 1988 Summer Olympics =

- Flag of SFR Yugoslavia
- IOC code: YUG
- NOC: Yugoslav Olympic Committee

in Seoul
- Competitors: 155 (117 men and 38 women) in 18 sports
- Flag bearer: Matija Ljubek
- Medals Ranked 16th: Gold 3 Silver 4 Bronze 5 Total 12

Summer Olympics appearances (overview)
- 1920; 1924; 1928; 1932; 1936; 1948; 1952; 1956; 1960; 1964; 1968; 1972; 1976; 1980; 1984; 1988; 1992; 1996; 2000

Other related appearances
- Serbia (1912, 2008–pres.); Croatia (1992–pres.); Slovenia (1992–pres.); Bosnia and Herzegovina (1992 S–pres.); Independent Olympic Participants (1992 S); North Macedonia (1996–pres.); Serbia and Montenegro (1996–2006); Montenegro (2008–pres.); Kosovo (2016–pres.)

Athletes from the Socialist Federal Republic of Yugoslavia competed at the 1988 Summer Olympics in Seoul, South Korea. This was the last time that the SFR Yugoslavia competed in the Summer Olympics. 155 competitors, 117 men and 38 women, took part in 72 events in 18 sports.

== Medalists ==
Medal	Name	Sport	Event	Date
Gold	Goran Maksimović	Shooting	Men's 10 metre air rifle	20 September
Gold	Jasna Šekarić	Shooting	Women's 10 metre air pistol	21 September
Gold	Yugoslavia men's national water polo team: Aleksandar Šoštar; Deni Lušić; Dubravko Šimenc; Perica Bukić; Veselin Đuho; Dragan Andrić; Mirko Vičević; Igor Gočanin; Mislav Bezmalinović; Tomislav Paškvalin; Igor Milanović; Goran Rađenović; Renco Posinković	Water polo	Men's tournament	1 October
Silver	Yugoslavia women's national basketball team: Stojna Vangelovska; Mara Lakić; Žana Lelas; Eleonora Vild; Kornelija Kvesić; Danira Nakić; Slađana Golić; Polona Dornik; Razija Mujanović; Anđelija Arbutina; Bojana Milošević; Vesna Bajkuša	Basketball	Women's tournament	29 September
Silver	Yugoslavia men's national basketball team: Dražen Petrović; Zdravko Radulović; Zoran Čutura; Toni Kukoč; Žarko Paspalj; Željko Obradović; Jure Zdovc; Stojko Vranković; Vlade Divac; Franjo Arapović; Dino Rađa; Danko Cvjetićanin	Basketball	Men's tournament	30 September
Silver	Shaban Tërstena	Wrestling	Men's freestyle 52 kg	30 September
Silver	Ilija Lupulesku; Zoran Primorac	Table tennis	Men's doubles	30 September
Bronze	Jasna Šekarić	Shooting	Women's 25 metre pistol	19 September
Bronze	Sadik Mujkić; Bojan Prešern	Rowing	Men's coxless pair	24 September
Bronze	Damir Škaro	Boxing	Light heavyweight	29 September
Bronze	Gordana Perkučin; Jasna Fazlić	Table tennis	Women's doubles	30 September
Bronze	Yugoslavia men's national handball team: Rolando Pušnik; Momir Rnić; Muhamed Memić; Zlatan Saračević; Iztok Puc; Goran Perkovac; Irfan Smajlagić; Zlatko Portner; Veselin Vujović; Jožef Holpert; Boris Jarak; Mirko Bašić; Alvaro Načinović; Slobodan Kuzmanovski; Ermin Velić	Handball	Men's tournament	1 October

== Competitors ==
The following is the list of number of competitors in the Games.

Sport	Men	Women	Total
Athletics	8	2	10
Basketball	12	12	24
Boxing	7	–	7
Canoeing	3	0	3
Cycling	6	0	6
Football	17	–	17
Gymnastics	1	2	3
Handball	15	15	30
Judo	4	–	4
Rowing	10	0	10
Sailing	1	0	1
Shooting	3	3	6
Swimming	2	1	3
Table tennis	3	2	5
Tennis	2	1	3
Water polo	13	–	13
Wrestling	10	–	10
Total	117	38	155

== Athletics ==
Key

- Note–Ranks given for track events are within the athlete's heat only
- Q = Qualified for the next round
- q = Qualified for the next round as a fastest loser or, in field events, by position without achieving the qualifying target

Men

Track and road events

Athlete	Event	Heat		Quarterfinal		Semifinal		Final	
Athlete	Event	Time	Rank	Time	Rank	Time	Rank	Time	Rank
Slobodan Branković	400 m	46.59	5	Did not advance					
Ismail Mačev	400 m	46.37	5	Did not advance					
Slobodan Popović	800 m	1:46.49	3 Q	1:45.30	2 Q	1:45.11	6	Did not advance	
Branko Zorko	1500 m	3:45.52	9	—N/a		Did not advance			
Branislav Karaulić	400 m hurdles	51.32	5	—N/a		Did not advance			
Rok Kopitar	400 m hurdles	50.54	5	—N/a		Did not advance			
Slobodan Branković; Branislav Karaulić; Ismail Mačev; Slobodan Popović	4 × 400 m relay	3:05.62	2 Q	—N/a		3:01.59	5	Did not advance	
Miroslav Vindiš	Marathon	—N/a						2:17:47	25

Field events

Athlete	Event	Qualification		Final	
Athlete	Event	Result	Rank	Result	Rank
Sejad Krdžalić	Javelin throw	79.90	7 Q	73.28	12

Women

Athlete	Event	Heat		Quarterfinal		Semifinal		Final	
Athlete	Event	Time	Rank	Time	Rank	Time	Rank	Time	Rank
Slobodanka Čolović	800 m	2:01.80	2 Q	—N/a		1:57.49	3 Q	1:57.50	4

Field events

Athlete	Event	Qualification		Final	
Athlete	Event	Result	Rank	Result	Rank
Biljana Petrović	High jump	1.80	22	Did not advance	

== Basketball ==
=== Men's tournament ===
Team roster

The following is the Yugoslavia roster in the men's basketball tournament of the 1988 Summer Olympics.

Yugoslavia men's national basketball team – 1988 Summer Olympics roster
Players
Coaches

Pos.	No.	Name	Age – Date of birth	Height	Club	Ctr.
SG	4	Dražen Petrović	23 – 22 October 1964	1.96 m (6 ft 5 in)	KK Cibona	(Socialist Federal Republic of Yugoslavia)
SG	5	Zdravko Radulović	21 – 12 December 1966	1.91 m (6 ft 3 in)	KK Bosna Royal	(Socialist Federal Republic of Yugoslavia)
F	6	Zoran Čutura	26 – 12 March 1962	2.02 m (6 ft 8 in)	KK Cibona	(Socialist Federal Republic of Yugoslavia)
F	7	Toni Kukoč	19 – 18 September 1968	2.08 m (6 ft 10 in)	KK Split	(Socialist Federal Republic of Yugoslavia)
F	8	Žarko Paspalj	22 – 27 March 1966	2.07 m (6 ft 9 in)	KK Partizan	(Socialist Federal Republic of Yugoslavia)
PG	9	Željko Obradović	28 – 9 March 1960	1.80 m (5 ft 11 in)	KK Partizan	(Socialist Federal Republic of Yugoslavia)
G	10	Jure Zdovc	21 – 13 December 1966	1.98 m (6 ft 6 in)	KK Olimpija	(Socialist Federal Republic of Yugoslavia)
C	11	Stojko Vranković	24 – 22 January 1964	2.18 m (7 ft 2 in)	KK Zadar	(Socialist Federal Republic of Yugoslavia)
C	12	Vlade Divac	20 – 3 February 1968	2.16 m (7 ft 1 in)	KK Partizan	(Socialist Federal Republic of Yugoslavia)
C	13	Dino Rađa	21 – 24 April 1967	2.11 m (6 ft 11 in)	KK Split	(Socialist Federal Republic of Yugoslavia)
C	14	Franjo Arapović	23 – 2 June 1965	2.15 m (7 ft 1 in)	KK Cibona	(Socialist Federal Republic of Yugoslavia)
SG	15	Danko Cvjetićanin	24 – 16 October 1963	1.98 m (6 ft 6 in)	KK Cibona	(Socialist Federal Republic of Yugoslavia)

Head coach

Dušan Ivković

Legend

- Club – describes last
  club before the tournament
- Age – describes age
  on 17 September 1988

Group play

Pos	Team	Pld	W	L	PF	PA	PD	Pts	Qualification
1	Yugoslavia	5	4	1	468	384	+84	9 (Note: Head-to-head record: Yugoslavia 1–0 Soviet Union)	Quarterfinals
2	Soviet Union	5	4	1	460	393	+67	9	Quarterfinals
3	Australia	5	3	2	429	408	+21	8 (Note: Head-to-head record: Australia 1–0 Puerto Rico)	Quarterfinals
4	Puerto Rico	5	3	2	382	387	−5	8	Quarterfinals
5	Central African Republic	5	1	4	346	436	−90	6	9th–12th classification round
6	South Korea (H)	5	0	5	384	461	−77	5	9th–12th classification round

Source: FIBA archive
Rules for classification: 1) points; 2) head-to-head points; 3) head-to-head goal average; 4) head-to-head number of points scored.
(H) Hosts
Notes:

18 September 1988

Soviet Union	79–92	Yugoslavia
Scoring by half: 33–39, 46–53

Jamsil Gymnasium, Seoul

20 September 1988

Central African Republic	61–102	Yugoslavia
Scoring by half: 21–51, 40–51

Jamsil Gymnasium, Seoul

21 September 1988

South Korea	92–104	Yugoslavia
Scoring by half: 46–48, 46–56

Jamsil Gymnasium, Seoul

23 September 1988

Australia	78–98	Yugoslavia
Scoring by half: 43–52, 35–46

Jamsil Gymnasium, Seoul

24 September 1988

Puerto Rico	74–72	Yugoslavia
Scoring by half: 36–37, 38–35

Jamsil Gymnasium, Seoul

Quarterfinals

26 September 1988
21:30

Boxscore

Yugoslavia	95–73	Canada
Scoring by half: 40–26, 55–47
Pts: Divac 17; Rebs: Vranković 9 Asts: Cvjetićanin, Divac, Petrović 2		Pts: Walton 17; Rebs: Mungar, Walton 7 Asts: Hatch 2

Jamsil Gymnasium, Seoul

Semifinals

28 September 1988

Boxscore

Yugoslavia	91–70	Australia
Scoring by half: 44–31, 47–39
Pts: Petrović 24; Rebs: Divac 10; Asts: Petrović 3		Pts: Gaze 27; Rebs: Borner, Vlahov 4 Asts: Sengstock 4

Jamsil Gymnasium, Seoul

Gold medal match

30 September 1988

Boxscore

Yugoslavia	63–76	Soviet Union
Scoring by half: 28–31, 35–45
Pts: Petrović 24; Rebs: Divac 7 Asts: Petrović 4		Pts: Marčiulionis 21; Rebs: Sabonis 15; Asts: Marčiulionis 6

Jamsil Gymnasium, Seoul

=== Women's tournament ===
Team roster

The following is the Yugoslavia roster in the women's basketball tournament of the 1988 Summer Olympics.

Yugoslavia women's national basketball team – 1988 Summer Olympics roster
Players
Coaches

Pos.	No.	Name	Age – Date of birth	Height	Club	Ctr.
SG	4	Stojna Vangelovska	24 – 5 February 1964	1.72 m (5 ft 8 in)	ŽKD Ježica	(Socialist Federal Republic of Yugoslavia)
SG	5	Mara Lakić	25 – 18 August 1963	1.70 m (5 ft 7 in)	ŽKK Jedinstvo Tuzla	(Socialist Federal Republic of Yugoslavia)
C	6	Žana Lelas	18 – 28 May 1970	1.88 m (6 ft 2 in)	ŽKK Elemes	(Socialist Federal Republic of Yugoslavia)
SG	7	Eleonora Vild	19 – 9 June 1969	1.80 m (5 ft 11 in)	SG Aschaffenburg-Mainhausen	(Germany)
C	8	Kornelija Kvesić	25 – 25 August 1963	1.88 m (6 ft 2 in)	ŽKK Elemes	(Socialist Federal Republic of Yugoslavia)
SG	9	Danira Nakić	19 – 22 July 1969	1.84 m (6 ft 0 in)	ŽKK Elemes	(Socialist Federal Republic of Yugoslavia)
C	10	Slađana Golić	28 – 12 February 1960	1.89 m (6 ft 2 in)	ŽKK Vršac	(Socialist Federal Republic of Yugoslavia)
C	11	Polona Dornik	25 – 20 November 1962	1.96 m (6 ft 5 in)	ŽKD Ježica	(Socialist Federal Republic of Yugoslavia)
C	12	Razija Mujanović	21 – 15 April 1967	2.02 m (6 ft 8 in)	ŽKK Jedinstvo Tuzla	(Socialist Federal Republic of Yugoslavia)
G	13	Vesna Bajkuša	20 – 21 May 1968	1.76 m (5 ft 9 in)	ŽKK Željezničar	(Socialist Federal Republic of Yugoslavia)
SG	14	Anđelija Arbutina	21 – 29 March 1967	1.78 m (5 ft 10 in)	ŽKK Crvena zvezda	(Socialist Federal Republic of Yugoslavia)
C	15	Bojana Milošević	22 – 29 November 1965	1.88 m (6 ft 2 in)	ŽKK Crvena zvezda	(Socialist Federal Republic of Yugoslavia)

Head coach

Milan Vasojević

Legend

- Club – describes last
  club before the tournament
- Age – describes age
  on 17 September 1988

Group play

Pos	Team	Pld	W	L	PF	PA	PD	Pts	Qualification
1	United States	3	3	0	282	234	+48	6	Semifinals
2	Yugoslavia	3	2	1	199	211	−12	5	Semifinals
3	China	3	1	2	200	214	−14	4	Classification round
4	Czechoslovakia	3	0	3	202	224	−22	3	Classification round

Source: FIBA
Rules for classification: 1) points; 2) head-to-head points; 3) head-to-head goal average; 4) head-to-head number of points scored.

19 September 1988
21:30

Boxscore

China	53–56	Yugoslavia
Scoring by half: 32–35, 21–21
Pts: Zheng 13; Rebs: Zheng 7 Asts: Xue 3		Pts: Nakić 13; Rebs: Golić 9 Asts: Vangelovska 4

Jamsil Gymnasium, Seoul

22 September 1988
9:45

Boxscore

United States	101–74	Yugoslavia
Scoring by half: 55–40, 46–34
Pts: Edwards 23; Rebs: McClain 9 Asts: Weatherspoon 2		Pts: Golić 16; Rebs: Dornik 4 Asts: Bajkuša, Vangelovska 2

Jamsil Gymnasium, Seoul

25 September 1988
9:45

Boxscore

Czechoslovakia	57–69	Yugoslavia
Scoring by half: 15–41, 42–28
Pts: Dobrovičová 17; Rebs: Dobrovičová 9 Asts: Kalužáková 3		Pts: Nakić 24; Rebs: Dornik 8 Asts: Vangelovska 7

Jamsil Gymnasium, Seoul

Semifinals

27 September 1988
9:45

Boxscore

Australia	56–57	Yugoslavia
Scoring by half: 30–32, 26–25
Pts: Timms 19; Rebs: Dalton 8 Asts: Dalton, Maher 2		Pts: Mujanović 20; Rebs: Dornik, Mujanović, Nakić 4 Asts: Vangelovska 2

Jamsil Gymnasium, Seoul

Gold medal game

29 September 1988
12:00

Boxscore

Yugoslavia	70–77	United States
Scoring by half: 36–42, 34–35
Pts: Nakić 23; Rebs: Golić 10; Asts: Nakić 3		Pts: Edwards 18; Rebs: Brown 8 Asts: Edwards, McConnell 3

Jamsil Gymnasium, Seoul

== Boxing ==
Athlete	Event	First round	Second round	Third round	Quarterfinal	Semifinal	Final	
Athlete	Event	Opposition Result	Opposition Result	Opposition Result	Opposition Result	Opposition Result	Opposition Result	Rank
Ljubiša Simić	Featherweight	Bye	Kazaryan (URS); L 0–5	Did not advance				=17
Vukašin Dobrašinović	Light welterweight	Abadzhiev (BUL); W 3–2	Carew (GUY); L 1–4	Did not advance				=17
Đorđe Petronijević	Welterweight	Bye	Wangila (KEN); L RSC	Did not advance				=17
Darko Dukić	Middleweight	Bye	Lesiva (SAM); W RSC	Marcus (CAN); L KO	Did not advance			=9
Damir Škaro	Light heavyweight	Kirilov (BUL); W 3–2	Imadiyi (NGR); W 5–0	—N/a	Akhasamba (KEN); W 5–0	Shanavazov (URS); L w/o	Did not advance	3rd place, bronze medalist(s)
Željko Mavrović	Heavyweight	Bye	Hyun-Man (KOR); L 0–5	—N/a	Did not advance			=9
Aziz Salihu	Super heavyweight	Bye	Kaden (GDR); L 0–5	—N/a	Did not advance			=9

== Canoeing ==
Men

Athlete	Event	Heat		Repechage		Semifinal		Final	
Athlete	Event	Time	Rank	Time	Rank	Time	Rank	Time	Rank
Ivan Šabjan	C-1 500 m	2:00.55	4 R	Bye*		1:55.99	4	Did not advance	
Ivan Šabjan	C-1 1000 m	4:11.54	4 R	4:20.82	1 SF	4:08.75	3 QF	4:24.67	8
Mirko Nišović; Matija Ljubek	C-2 1000 m	4:02.10	5 R	3:59.04	5	Did not advance			

Key: QF – Qualified to medal final; SF – Qualified to semifinal; R – Qualified to repechage; * - Heat not held due to lack of competitors. All competitors scheduled for this heat advanced to the next round.

== Cycling ==
Six male cyclists represented Yugoslavia in 1988.

=== Road ===
Athlete	Event	Time	Rank
Valter Bonča	Men's road race	4:32:56	78
Mićo Brković	Men's road race	4:32:46	32
Rajko Čubrić	Men's road race	4:32:56	30
Valter Bonča; Sandi Papež; Jože Smole; Robert Šebenik	Men's team time trial	2:05:35.1	15

== Football ==
=== Men's team competition ===
- Preliminary round (group D)
  - Lost to Australia 0–1
  - Defeated Nigeria 3-1
  - Lost to Brazil 1–2 → Finished competition at the group stage.
- Team roster
  1. Dragoje Leković
  2. Vujadin Stanojković
  3. Predrag Spasić
  4. Srečko Katanec
  5. Davor Jozić
  6. Dragoljub Brnović
  7. Refik Šabanadžović
  8. Toni Savevski
  9. Ivica Barbarić
  10. Dragan Stojković
  11. Cvijan Milošević
  12. Stevan Stojanović
  13. Duško Milinković
  14. Davor Šuker
  15. Semir Tuce
  16. Vladislav Đukić
  17. Mirko Mihić
  18. Nenad Jakšić
- Head coach: Ivica Osim

== Gymnastics ==
=== Artistic ===
Men

Athlete	Event	Qualification							
Athlete	Event	Apparatus						Total	Rank
Athlete	Event	F	PH	R	V	PB	HB	Total	Rank
Alojz Kolman	Individual	18.250	18.500	18.400	18.900	18.550	17.850	110.45	82

=== Rhythmic ===
Athlete	Event	Qualification						Final						
Athlete	Event	Hoop	Rope	Clubs	Ribbon	Total	Rank	Qualification	Hoop	Rope	Clubs	Ribbon	Total	Rank
Milena Reljin	Individual	9.800	9.650	9.800	9.750	38.700	=6 Q	19.500	9.800	9.700	9.800	9.700	58.300	9
Dara Terzić	Individual	9.000	9.150	8.800	9.050	36.000	39	Did not advance						

== Handball ==
=== Men's team competition ===
- Preliminary round (group A)
  - Lost to Soviet Union (18–24)
  - Defeated United States (31–23)
  - Defeated Algeria (23–22)
  - Tied Iceland (19–19)
  - Defeated Sweden (25–21)
- Bronze Medal Match
  - Defeated Hungary (27–23) → Bronze Medal
- Team roster

- Mirko Bašić
- Jožef Holpert
- Boris Jarak
- Slobodan Kuzmanovski
- Muhamed Memić
- Alvaro Načinović
- Goran Perkovac
- Zlatko Portner
- Iztok Puc
- Rolando Pušnik
- Momir Rnić
- Zlatko Saračević
- Irfan Smajlagić
- Ermin Velić
- Veselin Vujović

- Head coach: ???

=== Women's team competition ===
- Team roster

- Svetlana Anastasovska
- Slavica Đukić
- Dragica Đurić
- Mirjana Đurica
- Zita Galic
- Ljubinka Janković
- Nataša Kolega
- Mirjana Krstić
- Ljiljana Marković
- Svetlana Mičić
- Ljiljana Mugoša
- Svetlana Mugoša
- Dragana Pešić
- Slavica Rinčić
- Desanka Stojanović

== Judo ==
Men's Half-Lightweight

- Dragomir Bečanović

Men's Half-Middleweight

- Filip Leščak

Men's Middleweight

- Ivan Todorov

Men's Heavyweight

- Dragomir Kusmuk

== Rowing ==
Men

Athlete	Event	Heat		Repechage		Semifinal		Final	
Athlete	Event	Time	Rank	Time	Rank	Time	Rank	Time	Rank
Sadik Mujkič; Bojan Prešern	Coxless pair	6:36.35	1 SF	Bye		6:49.44	2 FA	6:41.01	3rd place, bronze medalist(s)
Roman Ambrožič; Milan Janša; Sašo Mirjanič	Coxed pair	7:14.96	2 SF	Bye		7:09.45	4 FB	7:15.82	8
Vladimir Banjanac; Zlatko Celent; Sead Marušić; Lazo Pivač; Dario Varga	Coxed four	6:12.33	3 SF	Bye		6:15.72	3 FA	6:23.28	6

Qualification legend: FA = Final A (medal); FB = Final B (non-medal); SF = Semifinal; R = Repechage

== Sailing ==
Men

Athlete	Event	Race							Total	
Athlete	Event	1	2	3	4	5	6	7	Points	Rank
Roland Milošević	Division II	30.0	18.0	11.7	4.0	~~52.0~~	15.0	24.0	112.7	15

== Shooting ==
Men

Athlete	Event	Qualification		Final	
Athlete	Event	Score	Rank	Score	Rank
Rajmond Debevec	10 m air rifle	585	25	did not advance	
Goran Maksimović	50 m rifle three positions	1173	8 Q	1271.5	8
Goran Maksimović	50 m rifle prone	596	11	did not advance	
Goran Maksimović	10 m air rifle	594 OR	1 Q	695.6 OR	Gold medal
Srećko Pejović	50 m rifle three positions	1165	21	did not advance	
Srećko Pejović	50 m rifle prone	588	47	did not advance	

Women

Athlete	Event	Qualification		Final	
Athlete	Event	Score	Rank	Score	Rank
Mladenka Maleniča	50 m rifle three positions	570	28	did not advance	
Mladenka Maleniča	10 m air rifle	387	22	did not advance	
Jasna Šekarić	25 m pistol	591 OR	1 Q	686	Bronze medal
Jasna Šekarić	10 m air pistol	389	2 Q	489.5 OR	Gold medal

== Swimming ==
Men's 400 m Freestyle

- Darjan Petrič

- Heat – 3:56.94 (→ did not advance, 20th place)

- Igor Majcen

- Heat – 3:58.90 (→ did not advance, 28th place)

Men's 1500 m Freestyle

- Darjan Petrič

- Heat – 15:16.99
- Final – 15:37.12 (→ 8th place)

- Igor Majcen

- Heat – 15:29.16 (→ did not advance, 18th place)

Women's 200 m Breaststroke

- Anamarija Petričević

- Heat – 2:40.80 (→ did not advance, 32nd place)

Women's 200 m Individual Medley

- Anamarija Petričević

- Heat – 2:19.38
- Final – 2:19.63 (→ 13th place)

Women's 400 m Individual Medley

- Anamarija Petričević

- Heat – 4:54.17 (→ did not advance, 17th place)

== Table tennis ==
Men's Singles Competition

- Zoran Primorac
- Ilija Lupulesku
- Zoran Kalinić

Men's Doubles Competition

- Zoran Primorac, Ilija Lupulesku

Women's Singles Competition

- Jasna Fazlić
- Gordana Perkučin

Women's Doubles Competition

- Jasna Fazlić, Gordana Perkučin

== Tennis ==
Men's Singles Competition

- Slobodan Živojinović
- Goran Ivanišević

Men's Doubles Competition

- Slobodan Živojinović, Goran Ivanišević

Women's Singles Competition

- Sabrina Goleš
  1. First Round – Defeated Arantxa Sánchez Vicario (Spain) 6-4, 6–2
  2. Second Round – Lost to Gabriela Sabatini (Argentina) 1–6, 0–6

== Water polo ==
Men's Team Competition

- Preliminary round (group B)

- Lost to United States (6–7)
- Defeated Hungary (10–9)
- Defeated Greece (17–7)
- Defeated Spain (10–8)
- Defeated China (17–7)

- Semi Finals

- Defeated West Germany (14–10)

- Final

- Defeated United States (9–7) → Gold Medal

- Team roster

- Aleksandar Šoštar
- Deni Lusić
- Dubravko Šimenc
- Perica Bukić
- Veselin Đuho
- Dragan Andrić
- Mirko Vičević
- Igor Gočanin
- Mislav Bezmalinović
- Tomislav Paškvalin
- Igor Milanović
- Goran Rađenović
- Renco Posinković

- Head coach: Ratko Rudić

== Wrestling ==
Greco-Roman

- Zoran Galović
- Nandor Sabo
- Franc Podlesek
- Goran Kasum
- Bernard Ban
- Jožef Tertei

Men's Freestyle

- Šaban Trstena
- Zoran Šorov
- Šaban Sejdi
- Čedo Nikolovski
