= Basketball at the 1988 Summer Olympics – Women's tournament =

Tournament details
- Host country: South Korea
- Dates: 19–29 September 1988
- Teams: 8 (from 4 federations)
- Venue: 1 (in 1 host city)

Final positions
- Champions: United States (2nd title)

Tournament statistics
- Games played: 20
- Top scorer: (Bulgaria) Slavcheva (19.6)
- Top rebounds: (United States) McClain (10.4)
- Top assists: (United States) Edwards, (Australia) Maher (3.4)
- PPG (Team): United States (92.2)
- RPG (Team): United States (35.6)
- APG (Team): United States (12.0)

The women's tournament in basketball at the 1988 Summer Olympics in Seoul began on 19 September and ended on 29 September.

The United States won their second gold medal (and second consecutive gold medal) after defeating Yugoslavia, 77–70, in the gold medal match.

== Competition schedule ==
G	Group stage	¼	Quarter-finals	½	Semi-finals	C	Classification matches	B	Bronze medal match	F	Final

Mon 19	Tue 20	Wed 21	Thu 22	Fri 23	Sat 24	Sun 25	Mon 26	Tue 27		Wed 28		Thu 29	
G			G			G		C	½	C	B	C	F

== Qualification ==
A NOC could enter one women's team with 12 players. Automatic qualifications were granted to the host country and the winners from the previous edition. The remaining teams were decided by a tournament held in Kuala Lumpur, Malaysia where the top six teams earned a spot.

Asia	Europe	Oceania	Automatic qualifiers
China	Soviet Union; Yugoslavia; Czechoslovakia; Bulgaria	Australia	United States – Olympic Champions; South Korea – Olympic hosts

== Squads ==
Each NOC was limited to one team per tournament. Each team had a roster of twelve players.

== Group stage ==
=== Group A ===
Pos	Team	Pld	W	L	PF	PA	PD	Pts	Qualification
1	Australia	3	2	1	178	196	−18	5 (Note: Head-to-head record: Australia 1–0 Soviet Union)	Semifinals
2	Soviet Union	3	2	1	208	188	+20	5	Semifinals
3	Bulgaria	3	1	2	217	241	−24	4 (Note: Head-to-head record: Bulgaria 1–0 South Korea)	Classification round
4	South Korea (H)	3	1	2	244	222	+22	4	Classification round

Source: FIBA
Rules for classification: 1) points; 2) head-to-head points; 3) head-to-head goal average; 4) head-to-head number of points scored.
(H) Hosts
Notes:

19 September 1988
11:45

Boxscore

Bulgaria	62–91	Soviet Union
Scoring by half: 26–50, 36–41
Pts: Dermendzhieva, Staneva 17; Rebs: Staneva 6 Asts: Slavcheva 3		Pts: Zasulskaya 23; Rebs: Yakovleva, Zasulskaya 10; Asts: Minkh 4

Jamsil Gymnasium, Seoul

19 September 1988
19:30

Boxscore

Australia	55–91	South Korea
Scoring by half: 20–41, 35–50
Pts: Gorman 11; Rebs: Gorman 8 Asts: Maher, Timms 3		Pts: Lee KJ 19; Rebs: Choi, Kim HS 4 Asts: Lee HS, Sung 2

Jamsil Gymnasium, Seoul

22 September 1988
11:45

Boxscore

South Korea	66–69	Soviet Union
Scoring by half: 35–33, 31–36
Pts: Choi 20; Rebs: Sung 14		Pts: Savitskaya 18; Rebs: Savitskaya 6 Asts: Sumnikova 2

Jamsil Gymnasium, Seoul

22 September 1988
19:30

Boxscore

Australia	63–57	Bulgaria
Scoring by half: 31–30, 32–27
Pts: Maher 20; Rebs: Maher 9 Asts: Timms 3		Pts: Slavcheva 15; Rebs: Slavcheva 6 Asts: Slavcheva 2

Jamsil Gymnasium, Seoul

25 September 1988
19:30

Boxscore

Bulgaria	98–87	South Korea
Scoring by half: 48–51, 50–36
Pts: Slavcheva 39; Rebs: Slavcheva 8 Asts: Kostourkova 3		Pts: Choi 26; Rebs: Choi, Sung 7 Asts: 5 players 1

Jamsil Gymnasium, Seoul

25 September 1988
21:30

Boxscore

Australia	60–48	Soviet Union
Scoring by half: 30–30, 30–18
Pts: Maher 20; Rebs: Maher 8 Asts: Maher 6		Pts: Yakovleva 13; Rebs: 4 players 4 Asts: Minkh 2

Jamsil Gymnasium, Seoul

=== Group B ===
Pos	Team	Pld	W	L	PF	PA	PD	Pts	Qualification
1	United States	3	3	0	282	234	+48	6	Semifinals
2	Yugoslavia	3	2	1	199	211	−12	5	Semifinals
3	China	3	1	2	200	214	−14	4	Classification round
4	Czechoslovakia	3	0	3	202	224	−22	3	Classification round

Source: FIBA
Rules for classification: 1) points; 2) head-to-head points; 3) head-to-head goal average; 4) head-to-head number of points scored.

19 September 1988
9:45

Boxscore

Czechoslovakia	81–87	United States
Scoring by half: 39–37, 42–50
Pts: Nováková 21; Rebs: Nováková 8 Asts: Kalužáková, Nováková 2		Pts: Edwards 24; Rebs: McClain 8 Asts: Edwards 2

Jamsil Gymnasium, Seoul

19 September 1988
21:30

Boxscore

China	53–56	Yugoslavia
Scoring by half: 32–35, 21–21
Pts: Zheng 13; Rebs: Zheng 7 Asts: Xue 3		Pts: Nakić 13; Rebs: Golić 9 Asts: Vangelovska 4

Jamsil Gymnasium, Seoul

22 September 1988
9:45

Boxscore

United States	101–74	Yugoslavia
Scoring by half: 55–40, 46–34
Pts: Edwards 23; Rebs: McClain 9 Asts: Weatherspoon 2		Pts: Golić 16; Rebs: Dornik 4 Asts: Bajkuša, Vangelovska 2

Jamsil Gymnasium, Seoul

22 September 1988
21:30

Boxscore

China	68–64	Czechoslovakia
Scoring by half: 36–36, 32–28
Pts: Zheng 12; Rebs: Han 7 Asts: Xue 3		Pts: Dobrovičová 21; Rebs: Dobrovičová 5 Asts: Kalužáková 4

Jamsil Gymnasium, Seoul

25 September 1988
9:45

Boxscore

Czechoslovakia	57–69	Yugoslavia
Scoring by half: 15–41, 42–28
Pts: Dobrovičová 17; Rebs: Dobrovičová 9 Asts: Kalužáková 3		Pts: Nakić 24; Rebs: Dornik 8 Asts: Vangelovska 7

Jamsil Gymnasium, Seoul

25 September 1988
11:45

Boxscore

China	79–94	United States
Scoring by half: 37–46, 42–48
Pts: Zheng 32; Rebs: Zheng 8 Asts: Cong 5		Pts: McClain 27; Rebs: McClain 13; Asts: Edwards 5

Jamsil Gymnasium, Seoul

== Classification round ==
5th–8th Place

September 27
A3	Bulgaria	81
B4	Czechoslovakia	78
B3	China	97
A4	South Korea	95

5th place (September 29)
A3	Bulgaria	102
B3	China	74
7th place (September 28)
A4	South Korea	77
B4	Czechoslovakia	59

Classification 5–8 semifinals

27 September 1988
19:30

Boxscore

Bulgaria	81–78	Czechoslovakia
Scoring by half: 49–42, 32–36
Pts: Radkova 25; Rebs: Radkova 6 Asts: Khadzhiyankova, Slavcheva 3		Pts: Janoštinová 27; Rebs: Dobrovičová 9 Asts: Kysilková, Nováková 3

Jamsil Gymnasium, Seoul

27 September 1988
21:30

Boxscore

China	97–95 (OT)	South Korea
Scoring by half: 43–38, 42–47 Overtime: 12–10
Pts: Liu 24; Rebs: Liu 6 Asts: Xue 5		Pts: Choi 21; Rebs: Sung 7 Asts: Jeong, Park CM, Sung 2

Jamsil Gymnasium, Seoul

Classification 7–8

28 September 1988
19:30

Boxscore

South Korea	77–59	Czechoslovakia
Scoring by half: 41–26, 36–33
Pts: Choi 18; Rebs: Sung 6 Asts: Kim HS 3		Pts: Janoštinová 14; Rebs: Janoštinová 10; Asts: Janoštinová, Nováková 3

Jamsil Gymnasium, Seoul

Classification 5–6

29 September 1988
9:45

Boxscore

Bulgaria	102–74	China
Scoring by half: 53–19, 49–55
Pts: Slavcheva 22; Rebs: Staneva 8 Asts: Radkova 2		Pts: Zheng 23; Rebs: Cong, Peng 5 Asts: Cong, Liu, Xue 1

Jamsil Gymnasium, Seoul

== Knockout stage ==
Semifinals (September 27)
A1	Australia	56
B2	Yugoslavia	57
B1	United States	102
A2	Soviet Union	88

Gold medal (September 29)
B2	Yugoslavia	70
B1	United States	77
Bronze medal (September 28)
A1	Australia	53
A2	Soviet Union	68

=== Semifinals ===
27 September 1988
9:45

Boxscore

Australia	56–57	Yugoslavia
Scoring by half: 30–32, 26–25
Pts: Timms 19; Rebs: Dalton 8 Asts: Dalton, Maher 2		Pts: Mujanović 20; Rebs: Dornik, Mujanović, Nakić 4 Asts: Vangelovska 2

Jamsil Gymnasium, Seoul

27 September 1988
11:45

Boxscore

United States	102–88	Soviet Union
Scoring by half: 50–39, 52–49
Pts: Cooper 27; Rebs: McClain 15; Asts: Edwards 6		Pts: Zasulskaya 16; Rebs: Tuomaitė 6 Asts: Yakovleva 2

Jamsil Gymnasium, Seoul

=== Bronze medal game ===
28 September 1988
21:30

Boxscore

Australia	53–68	Soviet Union
Scoring by half: 21–32, 32–36
Pts: Maher 22; Rebs: Maher, Timms 3 Asts: Maher 4		Pts: Savitskaya 16; Rebs: Yakovleva 7 Asts: Buryakina 2

Jamsil Gymnasium, Seoul

=== Gold medal game ===
29 September 1988
12:00

Boxscore

Yugoslavia	70–77	United States
Scoring by half: 36–42, 34–35
Pts: Nakić 23; Rebs: Golić 10; Asts: Nakić 3		Pts: Edwards 18; Rebs: Brown 8 Asts: Edwards, McConnell 3

Jamsil Gymnasium, Seoul

== Awards ==
1988 Olympic Basketball Champions

United States
Second title

== Final ranking ==
Rankings are determined by classification games:

Rank	Women			
Rank	Team	Pld	W	L
1st place, gold medalist(s)	United States	5	5	0
2nd place, silver medalist(s)	Yugoslavia	5	3	2
3rd place, bronze medalist(s)	Soviet Union	5	3	2
4th	Australia	5	2	3
Eliminated in the group round
5th	Bulgaria	5	3	2
6th	China	5	2	3
7th	South Korea	5	2	3
8th	Czechoslovakia	5	0	5
