= 1988 United States women's Olympic basketball team =

- Head coach: Kay Yow

The 1988 United States women's Olympic basketball team competed in the Games of the XXIV Olympiad, held in Seoul, South Korea.

The U.S. women's Olympic team won their second gold medal at the event, defeating Yugoslavia in the Gold Medal finals.

== Roster ==
United States women's national basketball team – 1988 Summer Olympics roster
Players
Coaches

| Pos. | No. | Name | Age – Date of birth | Height | Club | Ctr. |
|---|---|---|---|---|---|---|
| SG | 4 | Teresa Edwards | 24 – July 19, 1964 | 1.75 m (5 ft 9 in) | Tarbes Gespe Bigorre | (France) |
| PG | 5 | Kamie Ethridge | 24 – April 21, 1964 | 1.65 m (5 ft 5 in) | U.S. national team | (United States) |
| F/C | 6 | Cindy Brown | 23 – March 16, 1965 | 1.88 m (6 ft 2 in) | Toshiba Yana Gi Cho | (Japan) |
| C | 7 | Anne Donovan | 26 – November 1, 1961 | 2.03 m (6 ft 8 in) | Modena | (Italy) |
| PG | 8 | Teresa Weatherspoon | 22 – December 8, 1965 | 1.73 m (5 ft 8 in) | Louisiana Tech | (United States) |
| F | 9 | Bridgette Gordon | 21 – April 27, 1967 | 1.83 m (6 ft 0 in) | Tennessee | (United States) |
| F | 10 | Vicky Bullett | 20 – October 4, 1967 | 1.91 m (6 ft 3 in) | Maryland | (United States) |
| F | 11 | Andrea Lloyd-Curry | 23 – September 2, 1965 | 1.88 m (6 ft 2 in) | U.S. national team | (United States) |
| F | 12 | Katrina McClain Johnson | 23 – September 19, 1965 | 1.85 m (6 ft 1 in) | U.S. national team | (United States) |
| F/C | 13 | Jennifer Gillom | 24 – June 13, 1964 | 1.91 m (6 ft 3 in) | U.S. national team | (United States) |
| G | 14 | Cynthia Cooper-Dyke | 25 – April 14, 1963 | 1.78 m (5 ft 10 in) | CD CREF | (Spain) |
| PG | 15 | Suzie McConnell-Serio | 22 – July 29, 1966 | 1.62 m (5 ft 4 in) | Penn State | (United States) |

Head coach

Kay Yow

Legend

- Club – describes last
  club before the tournament
- Country – describes country
  where the club plays in
- Age – describes age
  on September 17, 1988

== Results ==
=== Group stage ===
19 September 1988
9:45

| Czechoslovakia | 81–87 | United States |
Scoring by half: 39–37, 42–50
| Pts: Nováková 21; Rebs: Nováková 8 Asts: Kalužáková, Nováková 2 | | Pts: Edwards 24; Rebs: McClain 8 Asts: Edwards 2 |

Jamsil Gymnasium, Seoul

22 September 1988
9:45

| United States | 101–74 | Yugoslavia |
Scoring by half: 55–40, 46–34
| Pts: Edwards 23; Rebs: McClain 9 Asts: Weatherspoon 2 | | Pts: Golić 16; Rebs: Dornik 4 Asts: Bajkuša, Vangelovska 2 |

Jamsil Gymnasium, Seoul

25 September 1988
11:45

| China | 79–94 | United States |
Scoring by half: 37–46, 42–48
| Pts: Zheng 32; Rebs: Zheng 8 Asts: Cong 5 | | Pts: McClain 27; Rebs: McClain 13; Asts: Edwards 5 |

Jamsil Gymnasium, Seoul

=== Semifinal ===
27 September 1988
11:45

| United States | 102–88 | Soviet Union |
Scoring by half: 50–39, 52–49
| Pts: Cooper 27; Rebs: McClain 15; Asts: Edwards 6 | | Pts: Zasulskaya 16; Rebs: Tuomaitė 6 Asts: Yakovleva 2 |

Jamsil Gymnasium, Seoul

=== Gold Medal Final ===
29 September 1988
12:00

| Yugoslavia | 70–77 | United States |
Scoring by half: 36–42, 34–35
| Pts: Nakić 23; Rebs: Golić 10; Asts: Nakić 3 | | Pts: Edwards 18; Rebs: Brown 8 Asts: Edwards, McConnell 3 |

Jamsil Gymnasium, Seoul

== See also ==
- 1988 Summer Olympics
- Basketball at the 1988 Summer Olympics
- United States at the 1988 Summer Olympics
- United States women's national basketball team
