= 1990 FIBA World Championship for Women =

1990 edition of the FIBA World Championship for Women

11th FIBA World Championship for Women

Tournament details
- Host country: Malaysia
- Dates: 12–22 July
- Teams: 16 (from 5 federations)
- Venues: 4 (in 4 host cities)

Final positions
- Champions: United States (5th title)

Tournament statistics
- Top scorer: (Brazil) Marcari (31.5)
- PPG (Team): United States (91.1)

Official website
- 1990 FIBA World Championship for Women

The 1990 FIBA World Championship for Women (Malay: Kejohanan Dunia FIBA 1990 untuk Wanita) was the 11th FIBA World Championship for Women. The tournament was hosted by Malaysia, from 12 to 22 July 1990. It was the first edition of the tournament to raise the number of participating teams to 16; prior editions had seen between 8 and 14 teams competing, but this and future editions (2022 excepted) would include 16. The United States won their fifth world championship, defeating Yugoslavia 88–78 in the final.

== Venues ==
- Kuala Lumpur
- Kuching
- Kota Kinabalu
- Kota

== Preliminary round ==
=== Group A ===
| Pos | Team | Pld | W | L | PF | PA | PD | Pts | Qualification |
|---|---|---|---|---|---|---|---|---|---|
| 1 | Bulgaria | 3 | 2 | 1 | 270 | 194 | +76 | 5 | Advance to Quarterfinal Round |
| 2 | Australia | 3 | 2 | 1 | 233 | 163 | +70 | 5 | Advance to Quarterfinal Round |
| 3 | Italy | 3 | 2 | 1 | 233 | 177 | +56 | 5 | Eliminated |
| 4 | Malaysia | 3 | 0 | 3 | 131 | 333 | −202 | 3 | Eliminated |

Updated to match(es) played on unknown. Source: Standings

12 July
13:00

Boxscore

| Australia | 96–27 | Malaysia |
Scoring by half: 51-10, 45-17
| Pts: Thornton 21 | | Pts: Lew Foo 13 |

12 July
18:00

Boxscore

| Bulgaria | 63–67 | Italy |
Scoring by half: 31-27, 32-40
| Pts: Hadjijankova 16 | | Pts: Fullin 19 |

13 July
14:00

Boxscore

| Malaysia | 56–130 | Bulgaria |
Scoring by half: 29-59, 27-71
| Pts: Chin Kim 15 | | Pts: Hadjijankova 33 |

13 July
19:00

Boxscore

| Italy | 59–66 | Australia |
Scoring by half: 32-31, 27-35
| Pts: Pollini 24 | | Pts: Timms 18 |

14 July
14:00

Boxscore

| Italy | 107–48 | Malaysia |
Scoring by half: 52-20, 55-28
| Pts: Pollini 19 | | Pts: Wan Geok 9 |

14 July
19:00

Boxscore

| Australia | 71–77 | Bulgaria |
Scoring by half: 34-37, 37-40
| Pts: Timms 24 | | Pts: Hadjijankova 25 |

=== Group B ===
| Pos | Team | Pld | W | L | PF | PA | PD | Pts | Qualification |
|---|---|---|---|---|---|---|---|---|---|
| 1 | Soviet Union | 3 | 3 | 0 | 286 | 199 | +87 | 6 | Advance to Quarterfinal Round |
| 2 | Canada | 3 | 2 | 1 | 202 | 213 | −11 | 5 | Advance to Quarterfinal Round |
| 3 | Brazil | 3 | 1 | 2 | 214 | 248 | −34 | 4 | Eliminated |
| 4 | Japan | 3 | 0 | 3 | 227 | 269 | −42 | 3 | Eliminated |

Updated to match(es) played on unknown. Source: Standings

12 July
13:00

Boxscore

| Soviet Union | 103–79 | Japan |
Scoring by half: 53-39, 50-40
| Pts: Zassoulskaia 17 | | Pts: Katō 31 |

12 July
21:00

Boxscore

| Canada | 74–56 | Brazil |
Scoring by half: 28-33, 46-23
| Pts: Goodale 18 | | Pts: Marcari 25 |

13 July
16:00

Boxscore

| Japan | 69–75 | Canada |
Scoring by half: 35-33, 34-42
| Pts: Katō 17 | | Pts: Stammberger 18 |

13 July
21:00

Boxscore

| Soviet Union | 95–67 | Brazil |
Scoring by half: 46-36, 49-31
| Pts: Minkh 16 | | Pts: Arcain 31 |

14 July
16:00

Boxscore

| Brazil | 91–79 | Japan |
Scoring by half: 52-43, 39-36
| Pts: Marcari 28 | | Pts: Mikawa 22 |

14 July
19:00

Boxscore

| Soviet Union | 88–53 | Canada |
Scoring by half: 41-24, 47-29
| Pts: Zassoulskaia 15 | | Pts: Clarke 12 |

=== Group C ===
| Pos | Team | Pld | W | L | PF | PA | PD | Pts | Qualification |
|---|---|---|---|---|---|---|---|---|---|
| 1 | United States | 3 | 3 | 0 | 279 | 150 | +129 | 6 | Advance to Quarterfinal Round |
| 2 | Czechoslovakia | 3 | 2 | 1 | 219 | 183 | +36 | 5 | Advance to Quarterfinal Round |
| 3 | South Korea | 3 | 1 | 2 | 187 | 207 | −20 | 4 | Eliminated |
| 4 | Senegal | 3 | 0 | 3 | 126 | 271 | −145 | 3 | Eliminated |

Updated to match(es) played on unknown. Source: Standings

12 July
15:00

Boxscore

| United States | 106–36 | Senegal |
Scoring by half: 52-22, 54-14
| Pts: Edwards 19 | | Pts: Diakhaté 9 |

12 July
21:00

Boxscore

| Czechoslovakia | 67–60 | South Korea |
Scoring by half: 41-28, 26-32
| Pts: Dobrovicova 17 | | Pts: Seong 17 |

13 July
16:00

Boxscore

| Senegal | 37–93 | Czechoslovakia |
Scoring by half: 18-34, 19-59
| Pts: Mbengue 12 | | Pts: Vasilkova 22 |

13 July
21:00

Boxscore

| South Korea | 55–87 | United States |
Scoring by half: 34-44, 21-43
| Pts: Choi 16 | | Pts: Edwards 25 |

14 July
16:00

Boxscore

| South Korea | 72–53 | Senegal |
Scoring by half: 34-22, 38-31
| Pts: Choi 27 | | Pts: Mbengue 18 |

14 July
21:00

Boxscore

| United States | 86–59 | Czechoslovakia |
Scoring by half: 50-27, 36-32
| Pts: Edwards 15 | | Pts: Dobrovicova 9 |

=== Group D ===
| Pos | Team | Pld | W | L | PF | PA | PD | Pts | Qualification |
|---|---|---|---|---|---|---|---|---|---|
| 1 | Yugoslavia | 3 | 3 | 0 | 227 | 177 | +50 | 6 | Advance to Quarterfinal Round |
| 2 | Cuba | 3 | 2 | 1 | 232 | 219 | +13 | 5 | Advance to Quarterfinal Round |
| 3 | China | 3 | 1 | 2 | 223 | 226 | −3 | 4 | Eliminated |
| 4 | Zaire | 3 | 0 | 3 | 149 | 209 | −60 | 3 | Eliminated |

Updated to match(es) played on unknown. Source: Standings

12 July
00:00

Boxscore

| Yugoslavia | 64–39 | Zaire |
Scoring by half: 30-19, 34-20
| Pts: Golić 12 | | Pts: Lingenga 8 |

12 July
00:00

Boxscore

| China | 84–88 | Cuba |
Scoring by half: 48-47, 36-41
| Pts: Zheng 28 | | Pts: Hernández 23 |

13 July
14:00

Boxscore

| Zaire | 50–69 | China |
Scoring by half: 19-33, 31-36
| Pts: Bompoko 15 | | Pts: Zheng 15 |

13 July
19:00

Boxscore

| Cuba | 68–75 | Yugoslavia |
Scoring by half: 32-37, 36-38
| Pts: Borrell 18 | | Pts: Mujanovic 25 |

14 July
14:00

Boxscore

| Cuba | 76–60 | Zaire |
Scoring by half: 45-32, 31-28
| Pts: Hernandez 20 | | Pts: Lingenga 16 |

14 July
21:00

Boxscore

| Yugoslavia | 88–70 | China |
Scoring by half: 43-29, 45-41
| Pts: Mujanovic 24 | | Pts: Zheng 30 |

== Quarterfinal round ==
=== Group A ===
| Pos | Team | Pld | W | L | PF | PA | PD | Pts | Qualification |
|---|---|---|---|---|---|---|---|---|---|
| 1 | United States | 3 | 3 | 0 | 258 | 220 | +38 | 6 | Advance to Semi-Finals |
| 2 | Cuba | 3 | 2 | 1 | 236 | 237 | −1 | 5 | Advance to Semi-Finals |
| 3 | Bulgaria | 3 | 1 | 2 | 218 | 237 | −19 | 4 | Advance to 5-8th place Semi-Finals |
| 4 | Canada | 3 | 0 | 3 | 200 | 235 | −35 | 3 | Advance to 5-8th place Semi-Finals |

Updated to match(es) played on unknown. Source: Standings

17 July
16:00

Boxscore

| Bulgaria | 65–61 | Canada |

17 July
21:00

Boxscore

| United States | 87–78 | Cuba |

18 July
16:00

Boxscore

| United States | 95–70 | Canada |

18 July
19:00

Boxscore

| Cuba | 83–81 | Bulgaria |

19 July
14:00

Boxscore

| Canada | 69–75 | Cuba |

19 July
21:00

Boxscore

| Bulgaria | 72–93 | United States |

=== Group B ===
| Pos | Team | Pld | W | L | PF | PA | PD | Pts | Qualification |
|---|---|---|---|---|---|---|---|---|---|
| 1 | Yugoslavia | 3 | 3 | 0 | 225 | 199 | +26 | 6 | Advance to Semi-Finals |
| 2 | Czechoslovakia | 3 | 2 | 1 | 231 | 214 | +17 | 5 | Advance to Semi-Finals |
| 3 | Soviet Union | 3 | 1 | 2 | 212 | 206 | +6 | 4 | Advance to 5-8th place Semi-Finals |
| 4 | Australia | 3 | 0 | 3 | 184 | 233 | −49 | 3 | Advance to 5-8th place Semi-Finals |

Updated to match(es) played on unknown. Source: Standings

17 July
14:00

17 Boxscore

| Czechoslovakia | 66–81 | Yugoslavia |

17 July
19:00

Boxscore

| Australia | 60–70 | Soviet Union |

18 July
14:00

Boxscore

| Soviet Union | 79–82 | Czechoslovakia |

18 July
21:00

Boxscore

| Yugoslavia | 80–70 | Australia |

19 July
16:00

Boxscore

| Australia | 54–83 | Czechoslovakia |

19 July
19:00

Boxscore

| Yugoslavia | 64–63 | Soviet Union |

=== Group C ===
| Pos | Team | Pld | W | L | PF | PA | PD | Pts | Qualification |
|---|---|---|---|---|---|---|---|---|---|
| 1 | South Korea | 3 | 3 | 0 | 258 | 202 | +56 | 6 | Advance to 9-12th place Semi-Finals |
| 2 | Japan | 3 | 2 | 1 | 223 | 239 | −16 | 5 | Advance to 9-12th place Semi-Finals |
| 3 | Italy | 3 | 1 | 2 | 222 | 226 | −4 | 4 | Advance to 13-16th place Semi-Finals |
| 4 | Zaire | 3 | 0 | 3 | 197 | 233 | −36 | 3 | Advance to 13-16th place Semi-Finals |

Updated to match(es) played on unknown. Source: Standings

17 July
10:00

Boxscore

| South Korea | 79–70 | Zaire |
Scoring by half: 34-34, 45-36
| Pts: Seong 19 | | Pts: Lingenga 20 |

17 July
16:00

Boxscore

| Italy | 78–81 | Japan |
Scoring by half: 40-35, 31-36
| Pts: Pollini 25 | | Pts: Kato 20 |

18 July
10:00

Boxscore

| Zaire | 64–74 | Italy |
Scoring by half: 38-40, 26-34
| Pts: Fullin 24 | | Pts: Lingenga 29 |

18 July
12:00

Boxscore

| Japan | 62–98 | South Korea |
Scoring by half: 30-45, 32-53
| Pts: Kakizaki 14 | | Pts: Choi 24 |

19 July
10:00

Boxscore

| Japan | 80–63 | Zaire |
Scoring by half: 41-30, 39-33
| Pts: Mikawa 18 | | Pts: Mbuyi 15 |

19 July
14:00

Boxscore

| Italy | 70–81 | South Korea |
Scoring by half: 29-38, 41-43
| Pts: Fullin 20 | | Pts: Choi 23 |

=== Group D ===
| Pos | Team | Pld | W | L | PF | PA | PD | Pts | Qualification |
|---|---|---|---|---|---|---|---|---|---|
| 1 | Brazil | 3 | 3 | 0 | 318 | 202 | +116 | 6 | Advance to 9-12th place Semi-Finals |
| 2 | China | 3 | 2 | 1 | 326 | 204 | +122 | 5 | Advance to 9-12th place Semi-Finals |
| 3 | Senegal | 3 | 1 | 2 | 183 | 222 | −39 | 4 | Advance to 13-16th placeSemi-Finals |
| 4 | Malaysia | 3 | 0 | 3 | 140 | 339 | −199 | 3 | Advance to 13-16th placeSemi-Finals |

Updated to match(es) played on unknown. Source: Standings

17 July
10:00

Boxscore

| Senegal | 55–106 | China |

17 July
14:00

Boxscore

| Malaysia | 50–143 | Brazil |

18 July
14:00

Boxscore

| China | 123–49 | Malaysia |

18 July
16:00

Boxscore

| Brazil | 75–55 | Senegal |

19 July
12:00

Boxscore

| Malaysia | 41–73 | Senegal |

19 July
16:00

Boxscore

| Brazil | 100–97 | China |

== Knockout stage ==
=== Championship Bracket ===
Semifinals
21 July
United States | 87
Czechoslovakia | 59
21 July
Yugoslavia | 74
Cuba | 66

Final
22 July
United States | 88
Yugoslavia | 78
Third place
22 July
Czechoslovakia | 61
Cuba | 83

=== 5–8th place Bracket ===
5–8th-place semifinals
21 July
Soviet Union | 80
Canada | 56
21 July
Bulgaria | 71
Australia | 73

Fifth place
22 July
Soviet Union | 97
Australia | 73
Seventh place
22 July
Canada | 75
Bulgaria | 56

=== 9–12th place Bracket ===
9–12th-place semifinals
21 July
South Korea | 80
China | 81
21 July
Brazil | 100
Japan | 90

Ninth place
22 July
China | 95
Brazil | 90
Eleventh place
22 July
South Korea | 100
Japan | 84

=== 13–16th place Bracket ===
13–16th-place semifinals
21 July
Italy | 128
Malaysia | 60
21 July
Senegal | 60
Zaire | 52

Thirteenth place
22 July
Italy | 76
Senegal | 57
Fifteenth place
22 July
Malaysia | 46
Zaire | 88

=== 13–16th-place semifinals ===
21 July
10:00

Boxscore

| Italy | 128–60 | Malaysia |

21 July
12:00

Boxscore

| Senegal | 60–52 | Zaire |

=== 9–12th-place semifinals ===
21 July
14:00

Boxscore

| South Korea | 80–81 | China |

21 July
16:00

Boxscore

| Brazil | 100–90 | Japan |

=== 5–8th-place semifinals ===
21 July
14:00

Boxscore

| Bulgaria | 71–73 | Australia |

21 July
16:00

Boxscore

| Soviet Union | 80–56 | Canada |

=== Semi-finals ===
21 July
19:00

Boxscore

| United States | 87–59 | Czechoslovakia |
Scoring by half: 48-35, 39-24
| Pts: Edwards 23 | | Pts: Vasilkova 9 |

21 July
21:00

Boxscore

| Yugoslavia | 74–66 | Cuba |
Scoring by half: 37-28, 37-38
| Pts: Mujanović 29 | | Pts: Perdomo 13 |

=== Match for 15th place ===
22 July
10:00

Boxscore

| Malaysia | 46–88 | Zaire |

=== Match for 13th place ===
22 July
12:00

Boxscore

| Italy | 76–57 | Senegal |

=== Match for 11th place ===
22 July
14:00

Boxscore

| South Korea | 100–84 | Japan |

=== Match for 9th place ===
22 July
16:00

Boxscore

| China | 95–90 | Brazil |

=== Match for 7th place ===
22 July
13:00

Boxscore

| Canada | 75–56 | Bulgaria |

=== Match for 5th place ===
22 July
15:00

Boxscore

| Soviet Union | 97–73 | Australia |

=== Bronze-medal game ===
22 July
18:00

Boxscore

| Czechoslovakia | 61–83 | Cuba |
Scoring by half: 34-54, 27-31
| Pts: Dobrovicová 17 | | Pts: Hernández 26 |

=== Final ===
22 July
20:00

Boxscore

| United States | 88–78 | Yugoslavia |
Scoring by half: 41-31, 47-47
| Pts: McClain 23 | | Pts: Mujanovic 20 |

== Final standings ==
| # | Team | W-L |
|---|---|---|
| Gold medal | United States | 8–0 |
| Silver medal | Yugoslavia | 7–1 |
| Bronze medal | Cuba | 5–3 |
| 4. | Czechoslovakia | 4–4 |
| 5. | Soviet Union | 6–2 |
| 6. | Australia | 3–5 |
| 7. | Canada | 3–5 |
| 8. | Bulgaria | 3–5 |
| 9. | China | 5–3 |
| 10. | Brazil | 5–3 |
| 11. | South Korea | 5–3 |
| 12. | Japan | 2–6 |
| 13. | Italy | 5–3 |
| 14. | Senegal | 2–6 |
| 15. | Zaire | 1–7 |
| 16. | Malaysia | 0–8 |

== Awards ==
1990 World Championship winner

United States
Fifth title
