= 1983 FIBA World Championship for Women =

1983 edition of the FIBA World Championship for Women

9th FIBA World Championship for Women

Tournament details
- Host country: Brazil
- Dates: 24 July – 6 August
- Teams: 14 (from 5 federations)
- Venues: 4 (in 4 host cities)

Final positions
- Champions: Soviet Union (6th title)

Official website
- 1983 FIBA World Championship for Women

The 1983 FIBA World Championship for Women (Portuguese: Campeonato Mundial Feminino Fiba de 1983) was the ninth FIBA World Championship for Women. The tournament was hosted by Brazil, from 24 July to 6 August 1983. The Soviet Union won their sixth world championship, defeating the United States 84–82 in the final.

== Venues ==
City	Venue
Brasília	Nilson Nelson Gymnasium
Porto Alegre	Gigantinho
Rio de Janeiro	Ginásio do Maracanãzinho
São Paulo	Ginásio do Ibirapuera (Ibirapuera)

== Participating nations ==
Group A	Group B	Group C	Semifinal round
Bulgaria; Cuba; South Korea; Peru	Australia; Japan; Poland; Yugoslavia	Canada; China; Soviet Union; Zaire	Brazil – host United States

== Preliminary round ==
The top two teams in each group advanced to the semifinal round, while the bottom two teams played in the classification round.

=== Group A ===
Pos	Team	Pld	W	L	PF	PA	PD	Pts	Qualification
1	South Korea	3	3	0	225	171	+54	6	Advance to semifinal round
2	Bulgaria	3	2	1	221	163	+58	5	Advance to semifinal round
3	Cuba	3	1	2	219	208	+11	4	Qualified for classification round
4	Peru	3	0	3	148	271	−123	3	Qualified for classification round

Source: FIBA Archive

24 July 1983	South Korea	77–67	Cuba
20:00	Scoring by half: 38–39, 39–28

24 July 1983	Peru	44–90	Bulgaria
21:45	Scoring by half: 22–46, 22–44

25 July 1983	Bulgaria	76–60	Cuba
20:00	Scoring by half: 39–32, 37–28

25 July 1983	South Korea	89–49	Peru
22:00	Scoring by half: 40–25, 49–24

26 July 1983	Peru	55–92	Cuba
20:00	Scoring by half: 35–54, 20–38

26 July 1983	South Korea	59–55	Bulgaria
21:30	Scoring by half: 41–26, 18–29

=== Group B ===
Pos	Team	Pld	W	L	PF	PA	PD	Pts	Qualification
1	Poland	3	3	0	204	176	+28	6	Advance to semifinal round
2	Yugoslavia	3	2	1	227	187	+40	5	Advance to semifinal round
3	Australia	3	1	2	221	218	+3	4	Qualified for classification round
4	Japan	3	0	3	176	247	−71	3	Qualified for classification round

Source: FIBA Archive

24 July 1983	Australia	66–73	Poland
19:00	Scoring by half: 25–35, 41–38

24 July 1983	Yugoslavia	90–58	Japan
21:00	Scoring by half: 48–24, 42–34

25 July 1983	Japan	58–84	Australia
19:00	Scoring by half: 33–42, 25–42

25 July 1983	Yugoslavia	50–58	Poland
21:00	Scoring by half: 20–35, 30–23

26 July 1983	Australia	71–87	Yugoslavia
19:00	Scoring by half: 28–40, 43–47

26 July 1983	Poland	73–60	Japan
21:00	Scoring by half: 37–31, 36–29

=== Group C ===
Pos	Team	Pld	W	L	PF	PA	PD	Pts	Qualification
1	Soviet Union	3	3	0	287	166	+121	6	Advance to semifinal round
2	China	3	2	1	228	198	+30	5	Advance to semifinal round
3	Canada	3	1	2	201	205	−4	4	Qualified for classification round
4	Zaire	3	0	3	133	280	−147	3	Qualified for classification round

Source: FIBA Archive

24 July 1983	China	74–66	Canada
19:45	Scoring by half: 33–38, 41–28

24 July 1983	Soviet Union	117–40	Zaire
21:30	Scoring by half: 59–24, 58–16

25 July 1983	Zaire	47–90	China
19:45	Scoring by half: 19–39, 28–51

25 July 1983	Canada	62–85	Soviet Union
21:25	Scoring by half: 23–45, 39–40

26 July 1983	Soviet Union	85–64	China
19:45	Scoring by half: 46–30, 39–34

26 July 1983	Zaire	46–73	Canada
21:30	Scoring by half: 22–34, 24–39

== Classification round ==
Pos	Team	Pld	W	L	PF	PA	PD	Pts
9	Canada	5	5	0	331	255	+76	10
10	Cuba	5	4	1	418	310	+108	9
11	Australia	5	3	2	378	319	+59	8
12	Japan	5	2	3	300	342	−42	7
13	Peru	5	1	4	281	367	−86	6
14	Zaire	5	0	5	267	382	−115	5

Source: FIBA Archives

29 July 1983	Zaire	58–74	Peru	Sao Bernardo do Campo
18:00	Scoring by half: 29-32, 29-42
	Pts: Lomboto 14		Pts: Garces 18

29 July 1983	Australia	53–56	Canada
20:00	Scoring by half: 27–25, 26–31
	Pts: Cheesman 14		Pts: Lang 21

29 July 1983	Cuba	85–67	Japan
22:00	Scoring by half: 44–27, 41–40
	Pts: Despaigne 21		Pts: Kobota 20

30 July 1983	Peru	66–92	Australia
14:30	Scoring by half: 28–50, 38–42
	Pts: Picasso Salinas 22		Pts: Ogden 18

30 July 1983	Cuba	93–52	Zaire
16:30	Scoring by half: 54–31, 39–21
	Pts: Coss Quintana 24		Pts: Kamimbay 21

30 July 1983	Japan	52–71	Canada
18:30	Scoring by half: 30–31, 22–40
	Pts: Kobota 13		Pts: Sweeney 14

31 July 1983	Zaire	63–86	Australia
14:30	Scoring by half: 36–45, 27–41
	Pts: Iyoko 15		Pts: Ogden 18

31 July 1983	Japan	67–54	Peru
16:30	Scoring by half: 33–30, 34–24
	Pts: Nakahashi 18		Pts: Quelopana Bohorquez 12

31 July 1983	Cuba	72–73	Canada
18:30	Scoring by half: 33–32, 39–41
	Pts: Borrelli 17		Pts: Blackwell 16

1 August 1983	Canada	58–32	Peru
16:30	Scoring by half: 31–18, 27–14
	Pts: Huband 14		Pts: Manzur Betalleluz 10

1 August 1983	Japan	56–48	Zaire
18:30	Scoring by half: 31–25, 25–23
	Pts: Kobota 15		Pts: Kamimbay 16

1 August 1983	Cuba	76–63	Australia
20:00	Scoring by half: 39–26, 37–37
	Pts: Borrelli 19		Pts: Nykiel 15

== Semifinal round ==
The United States qualified for the semifinal round by virtue of winning the previous world championship, while Brazil qualified as hosts. A total of 25 matches were played in the semifinal round. Results between two teams from the preliminary round carried over; teams only played teams they had not already played.

Pos	Team	Pld	W	L	PF	PA	PD	Pts	Qualification
1	Soviet Union	7	7	0	626	448	+178	14	Qualified for the final
2	United States	7	6	1	649	509	+140	13	Qualified for the final
3	China	7	3	4	514	540	−26	10	Qualified for the bronze-medal match
4	South Korea	7	3	4	455	515	−60	10	Qualified for the bronze-medal match
5	Brazil (H)	7	3	4	542	570	−28	10	
6	Bulgaria	7	3	4	495	527	−32	10	
7	Poland	7	2	5	439	502	−63	9	
8	Yugoslavia	7	1	6	424	533	−109	8	

Source: FIBA Archives
(H) Hosts

28 July 1983	United States	101–91(OT)	China
17:00	Scoring by half: 41–39, 43–45, Overtime: 17–7
	Pts: Curry 28		Pts: Chen 31

28 July 1983	Poland	44–70	Soviet Union
20:30	Scoring by half: 26–34, 18–36
	Pts: Kepka 8		Pts: Semjonova 12

28 July 1983	Brazil	74–60	Yugoslavia
22:30	Scoring by half: 38-40, 36-20
	Pts: Marcari 46		Pts: Perazić 22

29 July 1983	South Korea	70–62	Poland
18:30	Scoring by half: 39–30, 31–32
	Pts: Kim 30		Pts: Sędzicka 22

29 July 1983	United States	92–49	Yugoslavia
20:30	Scoring by half: 47–23, 45–26
	Pts: Woodard 17		Pts: Dekleva 12

29 July 1983	Brazil	81–78	Bulgaria
22:30	Scoring by half: 45–36, 36–42
	Pts: Marcari 26		Pts: Slavcheva 16

30 July 1983	Brazil	71–72	China
16:00	Scoring by half: 35–41, 36–31
	Pts: Marcari 24		Pts: Song 26

30 July 1983	Bulgaria	71–57	Poland
20:30	Scoring by half: 41–33, 30–24
	Pts: Radkova 20		Pts: Kozera 16

30 July 1983	United States	84–85	Soviet Union
22:30	Scoring by half: 49–40, 35–45
	Pts: Miller 24		Pts: Semjonova 31

31 July 1983	Soviet Union	94–63	Bulgaria
18:30	Scoring by half: 44–35, 50–28
	Pts: Barel 21		Pts: Ivanova 13

31 July 1983	Yugoslavia	58–76	China
20:30	Scoring by half: 34–32, 24–44
	Pts: Perazić 22		Pts: Song 28

31 July 1983	Brazil	79–80	South Korea
22:30	Scoring by half: 45–45, 34–35
	Pts: Marcari 18		Pts: Kim 17

1 August 1983	United States	82–63	Poland
18:30	Scoring by half: 42–30, 40–33
	Pts: Woodard 17		Pts: Iwaniec 14

1 August 1983	Soviet Union	95–54	South Korea
20:30	Scoring by half: 48–24, 47–30
	Pts: Semjonova 12		Pts: Kim 19

1 August 1983	China	64–73	Bulgaria
22:30	Scoring by half: 34–36, 30–37
	Pts: Chen 31		Pts: Dermendzhieva 20

2 August 1983	Yugoslavia	64–98	Soviet Union
18:30	Scoring by half: 29–49, 35–49
	Pts: Perazić 20		Pts: Chausova 20

2 August 1983	South Korea	69–72(OT)	China
20:30	Scoring by half: 31–35, 30–26, Overtime: 8-11
	Pts: Choi 19		Pts: Chen 26

2 August 1983	Brazil	78–109	United States
22:30	Scoring by half: 37–59, 41–50
	Pts: Marcari 38		Pts: Miller 20

3 August 1983	Bulgaria	78–73	Yugoslavia
18:30	Scoring by half: 38–31, 40–42
	Pts: Dermendzhieva 22		Pts: Dornik 22

3 August 1983	United States	82–66	South Korea
22:30	Scoring by half: 45–39, 37–27
	Pts: Woodard 24		Pts: Park 15

3 August 1983	Brazil	84–72	Poland
22:30	Scoring by half: 39–37, 45–35
	Pts: Marcari 28		Pts: Sędzicka 17

4 August 1983	Yugoslavia	70–57	South Korea
15:00	Scoring by half: 34–30, 36–27
	Pts: Perazić 26		Pts: Park 16

4 August 1983	United States	99–77	Bulgaria
17:00	Scoring by half: 48–46, 51–31
	Pts: Miller 18		Pts: Slavcheva 17

4 August 1983	China	75–83	Poland
20:30	Scoring by half: 38–40, 37–43
	Pts: Song 24		Pts: Seweryn 24

4 August 1983	Brazil	75–99	Soviet Union
22:30	Scoring by half: 40–55, 35–44
	Pts: Marcari 23		Pts: Barel 18

== Medal games ==
=== Bronze-medal match ===
6 August 1983
19:30

report

China	71–63	South Korea
Scoring by half: 32–27, 39–36
Pts: Qiu 26		Pts: Kim 24

=== Final ===
6 August 1983
21:45

Boxscore

Soviet Union	84–82	United States
Scoring by half: 37–40, 47–42
Pts: Elena Chausova (24)		Pts: Cheryl Miller (23)

Rio de Janeiro

== Final standings ==
#	Team
1	Soviet Union
2	United States
3	China
4	South Korea
5	Brazil
6	Bulgaria
7	Poland
8	Yugoslavia
9	Canada
10	Cuba
11	Australia
12	Japan
13	Peru
14	Zaire

== Awards ==
1983 World Championship winner

Soviet Union
Sixth title
