= Vild =

Vild may refer to:

== People ==
- Eleonora Vild (born 1969), Serbian basketball player

== Places ==
- Vild, Sargans, Switzerland
- Ludhiana Airport, India (by ICAO code)

== Other ==
- Vild is Swedish, Danish and Norwegian for wild.
