= Vitalija =

- Gender: Female
- Language: Lithuanian

Origin
- Region of origin: Lithuania

Other names
- Related names: Vilija

Vitalija is a Lithuanian feminine given name. People bearing the name Vitalija include:

- Vitalija Bartkuvienė (1939–1996), Lithuanian painter
- Vitalija Tuomaitė (1964–2007), basketball player
