= Mićo Brković =

Serbian cyclist (born 1968)

Personal information
- Born: 1 March 1968 (age 58)

Cycling career
- Sport: Cycling

Mićo Brković (Serbian Cyrillic: Мићо Брковић; born 1 March 1968) is a Yugoslav former cyclist. He competed at the 1988 Summer Olympics for Yugoslavia and the 1992 Summer Olympics as an Independent Olympic Participant.
