= Vilija (given name) =

- Gender: Female
- Language: Lithuanian

Origin
- Region of origin: Lithuania

Other names
- Related names: Vitalija

Vilija is a Lithuanian feminine given name. Individuals with the name Vilija include:

- Vilija Aleknaitė-Abramikienė (born 1957), Lithuanian politician
- Vilija Blinkevičiūtė (born 1960), Lithuanian lawyer and politician
- Vilija Matačiūnaitė (born 1986), Lithuanian singer
- Vilija Sereikaitė (born 1987), Lithuanian racing cyclist
- Vilija Pilibaitytė (aka Mia; born 1983), Lithuanian singer and television host
