= Eva Berková =

Slovak basketball player (born 1965)

Personal information
- Nationality: Slovak
- Born: 23 October 1965 (age 61) Bratislava, Czechoslovakia

Sport
- Sport: Basketball

Eva Berková (born 23 October 1965) is a Slovak basketball player. She competed in the women's tournament at the 1988 Summer Olympics and the 1992 Summer Olympics.
