= Mariana Naydenova =

Bulgarian basketball player

Personal information
- Nationality: Bulgarian
- Born: 11 February 1962 (age 63); Pernik, Bulgaria

Sport
- Sport: Basketball

Mariana Naydenova (Bulgarian: Марияна Найденова) (born 11 February 1962) is a Bulgarian basketball player. She competed in the women's tournament at the 1988 Summer Olympics.
