= Olga Buryakina =

Russian basketball player

Personal information
- Born: 17 March 1958 (age 68) Moscow
- Height: 174 cm (5 ft 9 in)
- Weight: 62 kg (137 lb)
Medal record
Women's basketball
Representing the Soviet Union
Olympic Games
| Bronze medal – third place | 1988 Seoul | Team competition |
European Championships
| Gold medal – first place | 1985 Italy | Team competition |

Olga Valentinovna Buryakina (Russian: Ольга Валентиновна Бурякина; born 17 March 1958 in Moscow) is a Russian former basketball player who competed for the Soviet Union at the 1988 Summer Olympics.
