= Kikuko Mikawa =

Japanese basketball player (born 1968)

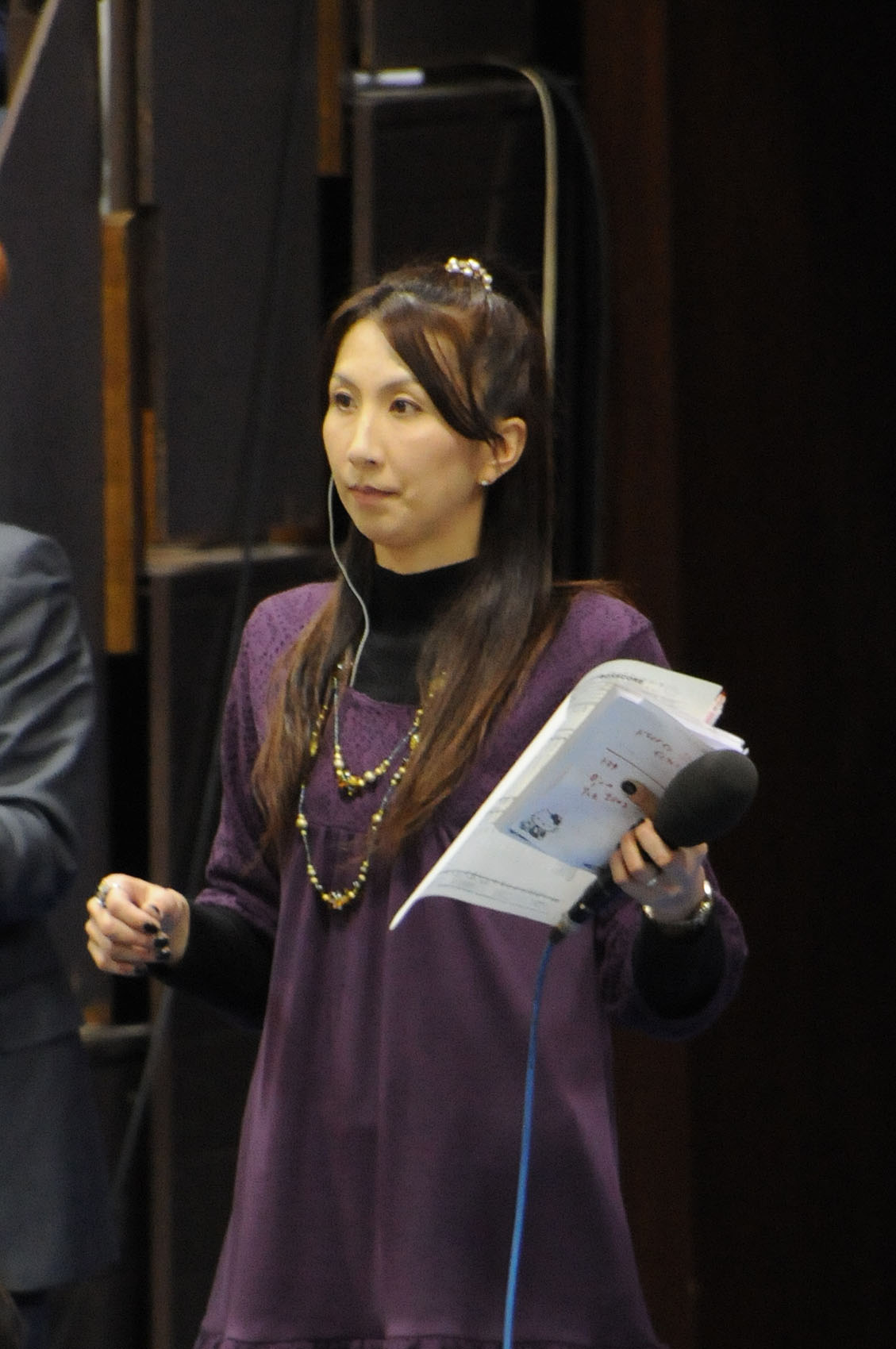
- Mikawa in 2010

Personal information
- Nationality: Japanese
- Born: 29 April 1968 (age 57); Kyoto, Japan

Sport
- Sport: Basketball

Kikuko Mikawa (born 29 April 1968) is a Japanese basketball player. She competed in the women's tournament at the 1996 Summer Olympics.
