= Zuzana Hájková (basketball) =

Czech basketball player

Zuzana Kabrhelová
Personal information
- Birth name: Zuzana Hájková
- Nationality: Czech
- Born: 15 January 1963 (age 62); Prague, Czechoslovakia

Sport
- Sport: Basketball

Zuzana Kabrhelová (born Zuzana Hájková 15 January 1963) is a Czech basketball player. She competed in the women's tournament at the 1988 Summer Olympics.

== Sports career ==
In the Czechoslovak women's basketball league, she played for 10 seasons (1980–1993), including 9 seasons with the VŠ Praha team. With this team, she won six Czechoslovak national championship titles (1981–1985, 1987–1989) and finished second three times (1981, 1985–1987).
