= Chen Yuefang =

Chinese basketball player

Medal record

Women's basketball

Representing China

Olympic Games
Bronze medal – third place	1984 Los Angeles	Team competition

Asian Games
Gold medal – first place	1982 New Delhi	Team competition

Chen Yuefang (Chinese: 陈月芳; 1 May 1963 – 18 September 2000) was a Chinese basketball player who competed in the 1984 Summer Olympics. At 2.08 m (6 ft 10 in), she was one of the tallest female Chinese basketball players ever, but cerebral thrombosis and anemia forced her to retire in 1985 at the age of 22. She died at the age of 37.
