= Mukendi Mbuyi =

Congolese basketball player (born 1960)

Personal information
- Nationality: Congolese
- Born: 26 April 1960 (age 64); Kananga, Zaire

Sport
- Sport: Basketball

Mukendi Mbuyi (born 26 April 1960) is a Congolese basketball player. She competed in the women's tournament at the 1996 Summer Olympics.
