= Galina Savitskaya =

Belarusian basketball player

Personal information
- Born: 13 July 1961 (age 64) Minsk
- Height: 187 cm (6 ft 2 in)
- Weight: 79 kg (174 lb)
Medal record
Women's basketball
Representing the Soviet Union
Olympic Games
Bronze medal – third place	1988 Seoul	Team competition
European Championships
Gold medal – first place	1985 Italy	Team competition

Galina Savitskaya (born 13 July 1961) is a Belarusian former basketball player, born in Minsk, who competed for the Soviet Union at the 1988 Summer Olympics.
