= Kim Mal-lyun =

South Korean basketball player

Personal information
- Nationality: South Korean
- Born: 28 June 1953 (age 72)

Sport
- Sport: Basketball

Korean name
- Hangul: 김말련
- Hanja: 金末蓮
- RR: Gim Malryeon
- MR: Kim Mallyŏn

Kim Mal-lyun (born 28 June 1953) is a South Korean basketball player. She competed in the women's tournament at the 1988 Summer Olympics.
