= Olesya Barel =

Russian basketball player

Personal information
- Born: 9 February 1960 (age 66) Kostroma
- Height: 190 cm (6 ft 3 in)
- Weight: 78 kg (172 lb)
Medal record
Women's basketball
Representing the Soviet Union
Olympic Games
Bronze medal – third place	1988 Seoul	Team competition
European Championships
Gold medal – first place	1985 Italy	Team competition

Olesya Ivanovna Barel (Russian: Олеся Ивановна Барель; born 9 February 1960) is a Russian former basketball player who competed for the Soviet Union at the 1988 Summer Olympics.
