= Sonya Dragomirova =

Bulgarian basketball player

Personal information
- Nationality: Bulgarian
- Born: 7 September 1961 (age 63); Pernik, Bulgaria

Sport
- Sport: Basketball

Sonya Dragomirova (born 7 September 1961) is a Bulgarian basketball player. She competed in the women's tournament at the 1988 Summer Olympics.
