= Hana Zarevúcká =

Czech basketball player

Personal information
- Nationality: Czech
- Born: 3 March 1961 (age 64); Prague, Czechoslovakia

Sport
- Sport: Basketball

Hana Zarevúcká (born 3 March 1961) is a Czech basketball player. She competed in the women's tournament at the 1988 Summer Olympics.
