= Song Xiaobo =

Chinese basketball player and coach

Personal information
- Born: September 8, 1958 (age 67) Beijing, People’s Republic of China
Medal record
Women's basketball
Representing China
Olympic Games
Bronze medal – third place	1984 Los Angeles	Team competition
Asian Games
Silver medal – second place	1978 Bangkok	Team competition
Gold medal – first place	1982 New Delhi	Team competition

Song Xiaobo (simplified Chinese: 宋晓波; traditional Chinese: 宋曉波; pinyin: Sòng Xiǎobō; born September 8, 1958) is a Chinese basketball player and coach. She is perhaps the most celebrated woman basketball player of the 1970s era in China; as a player she had outstanding all around ball skills, a very high level of athleticism, and a clear, bright, driving work ethic. Song was outstanding at every position from guard to center and she enjoys acclaim as "China's greatest female basketball player of all time". She is currently the CEO of a sports promotion company in Beijing.

== Basketball career ==
Song Xiaobo was born to a basketball family in Beijing; both her mother and father played basketball. In 1975 she competed for Beijing in the 3rd Chinese National Games, and in 1979 in the 4th Chinese National Games; and in 1977, 1979 and 1981 in the Chinese National Women's Basketball Tournament.

Sung's first participation as a member of the China women's national basketball team came in 1983 at the FIBA World Championship for Women; China won the bronze medal and Song received two individual awards, forthwith becoming the pre-eminent woman basketballer in China, and presently the captain of the national team. At the 1984 Summer Olympics Sung represented the Chinese athletic delegation and carried the national flag at the opening ceremonies; soon thereafter she and the team stood on the medal platform having won the bronze medal. During this era she also led the national team to their 4th and 5th Asian championships out of 9 possible total chances.

In 1985, after retiring from play, Sung began a career as a basketball coach in China, and toured to Australia, Taiwan and other places as a teacher and coach. At the present she is chairman of a Beijing-based sports promotion company, working in creating financing and investment for sports organizations, especially for basketball leagues and facilities.

== Honors and awards ==
- 1979, 1982 1983, listed on the China Top Ten List of Athletes
- 1983 World Women's Basketball Championship Top scorer and MVP

1983 World Women's Basketball Championship team bronze medal

- 1984 Olympics team bronze medal
- 4 Asian championships
- Chosen to "China's Top 50 Basketball Players of All Time" list
