= Tsonka Vaysilova =

Bulgarian basketball player

Personal information
- Nationality: Bulgarian
- Born: 20 February 1967 (age 58) Panagyurishte, Bulgaria

Sport
- Sport: Basketball

Tsonka Vaysilova (Bulgarian: Цонка Вайсилова) (born 20 February 1967) is a Bulgarian basketball player. She competed in the women's tournament at the 1988 Summer Olympics.
