= Olga Yakovleva (basketball, born 1963) =

Russian basketball player

Personal information
- Born: 15 December 1963 (age 62) Saint Petersburg
- Height: 186 cm (6 ft 1 in)
- Weight: 78 kg (172 lb)
Medal record
Women's basketball
Representing the Soviet Union
Olympic Games
Bronze medal – third place	1988 Seoul	Team competition
European Championships
Gold medal – first place	1985 Italy	Team competition

Olga Yakovleva (born 15 December 1963) is a Russian former basketball player who competed for the Soviet Union at the 1988 Summer Olympics.
