= Razija Mujanović =

Bosnian basketball player (born 1967)

Personal information
- Born: 15 April 1967 (age 59) Čelić, SR Bosnia-Herzegovina, SFR Yugoslavia
- Listed height: 2.02 m (6 ft 8 in)
- Listed weight: 75 kg (165 lb)

Career information
- Playing career: 1982–2009
- Position: Center
- Number: 12

Career history
- 1982–1990: Jedinstvo Aida
- 1991–1992: Dorna Godella
- 1991–1992: Basket Puglia Bari
- 1992–1996: Pool Comense
- 1996-1998: Microcamp Campinas
- 1998: Detroit Shock
- 1998-1999: Basket Vicenza
- 1999-2000: Basket Messina
- 2000-2002: Celta Vigo
- 2002-2003: FC Barcelona
- 2004: Como
- 2004-2005: Zagreb
- 2005-2006: FC Barcelona
- 2006-2007: Txingudi SBE
- 2007-2008: Celta Vigo
- 2008–2009: Ragusa Dubrovnik

Career highlights
- 3× Euroscar European Player of the Year (1991, 1994, 1995)
- Stats at Basketball Reference
- FIBA Hall of Fame
Medals
Women's basketball
Representing (Socialist Federal Republic of Yugoslavia) Yugoslavia
European Championship
Silver medal – second place	1987 Madrid
Silver medal – second place	1991 Tel Aviv
Olympic Games
Silver medal – second place	1988 Seoul
FIBA World Cup
Silver medal – second place	1990 Malaysia
Representing Bosnia and Herzegovina
Mediterranean Games
Gold medal – first place	1993 France

Razija Mujanović (born 15 April 1967) is a Bosnian former women's basketball player. She was voted the best female European basketball player three times (1991, 1994 and 1995) by the Italian sports magazine La Gazzetta dello Sport. She was elected to the FIBA Hall of Fame in 2017.

== Club career ==
Mujanović started her career with Jedinstvo Aida in Tuzla, and continued to play in Italy, Spain, Brazil, the United States, Croatia and Hungary. During her club career, she was twelve-time national league champion (in 1988, 1990, 1992 through 1998, 2002, 2003, 2005), and one national cup in 1992. She won EuroLeague four times, in 1989, 1992, 1994, and 1995. During her club career, she was voted best female European basketball player in Euroscar European Player of the Year three times, in 1991, 1994, and 1995.

=== WNBA career ===
On 27 January 1998, Mujanović was selected in the initial player allocation of the WNBA and was assigned to the Detroit Shock. Her debut game was played on 13 June 1998 in a 69 - 78 loss to the Charlotte Sting where she recorded a double-double with 22 points and 13 rebounds.

Mujanović was the starting Center for the Shock throughout all of the franchise's 30 games of the 1998 season and had averages of 9.1 points, 5.1 rebounds in 23.2 minutes per game. The team finished with a 17 - 13 record but missed the playoffs. Although she had a productive year with the Shock, the 1998 season ended up being Mujanović' only season in the WNBA.

Because the Shock missed the playoffs, the last game of the Shock's regular season ended up also being Mujanović' final WNBA game. That game was played on August 19, 1998 and the Shock won over the New York Liberty 82–68, with Mujanović recording 16 points, seven rebounds, two assists and one block.

== National team career ==
Mujanović won silver medals with the senior Yugoslavia women's national basketball team, at the 1988 Summer Olympic Games, the 1990 FIBA World Cup, and the EuroBasket Women 1991. She later played with the senior Bosnian women's national basketball team. She played her last game with Bosnia, in September 2007.

On 21 September 2017, Mujanović would be inducted into the FIBA Hall of Fame.

== Career statistics ==
Legend
GP	Games played	GS	Games started	MPG	Minutes per game	RPG	Rebounds per game
APG	Assists per game	SPG	Steals per game	BPG	Blocks per game	PPG	Points per game
TO	Turnovers per game	FG%	Field-goal percentage	3P%	3-point field-goal percentage	FT%	Free-throw percentage
**Bold**	Career best	°	League leader

=== WNBA ===
==== Regular season ====
Year	Team	GP	GS	MPG	FG%	3P%	FT%	RPG	APG	SPG	BPG	TO	PPG
1998	Detroit	30°	30°	23.2	.520	–	.667	5.1	1.0	.3	.9	2.1	9.1
