= Xue Cuilan =

Chinese basketball player

Personal information
- Nationality: Chinese
- Born: 1 April 1963 (age 62)

Sport
- Sport: Basketball

Xue Cuilan (Chinese: 薛翠兰; pinyin: Xuē Cuìlán, born 1 April 1963) is a Chinese basketball player. She competed in the women's tournament at the 1988 Summer Olympics.
