= Kornelija Kvesić =

Croatian basketball player

Personal information
- Born: 25 August 1963 (age 63) Kakanj, SR Bosnia-Herzegovina, SFR Yugoslavia
- Listed height: 1.88 m (6 ft 2 in)
- Listed weight: 72 kg (159 lb)
- Position: Center

Career history
- Rade Končar
- Bosna
- Šibenik
- Panathinaikos
Medals
Women's basketball
Representing Yugoslavia
Olympic Games
Silver medal – second place	1988 Seoul	Team
World Cup
Silver medal – second place	1990 Cádiz	Team
EuroBasket Women
Silver medal – second place	1987 Cádiz	Team
Universiade
Bronze medal – third place	1985 Kobe	Team

Kornelija Kvesić (born 25 August 1963 in Kakanj, SR Bosnia and Herzegovina, SFR Yugoslavia) is a Yugoslav and Bosnian former female professional basketball player.
