= Irina Minkh =

Russian basketball player

Medal record

Women's basketball

Olympic Games

Representing the Soviet Union
Bronze medal – third place	1988 Seoul	Team competition

Representing the Unified Team
Gold medal – first place	1992 Barcelona	Team competition

Irina Edvinovna Minkh (Russian: Ирина Эдвиновна Минх, born 16 April 1964) is a Russian former basketball player who competed in the 1988 Summer Olympics and in the 1992 Summer Olympics.

Born into a family of German descent.

On 4 October 2018, the mayor of Novosibirsk Anatoly Lokot said he appointed Irina Minkh as the Sports Adviser to the Mayor.
