= Vitalija Tuomaitė =

Lithuanian basketball player (1964–2007)

Personal information
- Born: 22 November 1964 Pakruojis, Lithuania
- Died: 8 August 2007 (aged 42) Vilnius, Lithuania
- Height: 193 cm (6 ft 4 in)
- Weight: 87 kg (192 lb)
Medal record
Women's basketball
Representing the Soviet Union
Olympic Games
Bronze medal – third place	1988 Seoul	Team competition
European Championships
Gold medal – first place	1985 Italy	Team competition

Vitalija Tuomaitė (22 November 1964 – 8 August 2007) was a Lithuanian basketball player who competed for the Soviet Union at the 1988 Summer Olympics.
