= Kim Hwa-soon =

South Korean basketball player

- Hangul: 김화순
- RR: Gim Hwasun
- MR: Kim Hwasun

Kim Hwa-soon
Medal record

Women's basketball

Representing South Korea

Olympic Games
Silver medal – second place	1984 Los Angeles	Team competition

Asian Games
Silver medal – second place	1982 New Delhi	Team competition
Silver medal – second place	1986 Seoul	Team competition

Kim Hwa-soon (born 12 April 1962) is a South Korean former basketball player who competed in the 1984 Summer Olympics and in the 1988 Summer Olympics. She later attended night school at the Chung-Ang University, graduating in 2002 with a degree in Physical Education.
