= Eleonora Vild =

Serbian basketball player

Personal information
- Born: 9 June 1969 (age 57) Bačka Topola, SR Serbia, SFR Yugoslavia
- Listed height: 1.80 m (5 ft 11 in)
- Listed weight: 70 kg (154 lb)
- Position: Shooting guard

Career history
- Spartak Subotica
- Crvena zvezda
- DJK Wildcats Aschaffenburg
Medals
Women's basketball
Representing Yugoslavia
Summer Olympics
Silver medal – second place	1988 Seoul	Team competition
FIBA World Championship
Silver medal – second place	1990 Kuala Lumpur	Team competition
EuroBasket
Silver medal – second place	1991 Tel Aviv	Team competition

Eleonora Vild Đoković (Serbian Cyrillic: Елеонора Вилд Ђоковић; born 9 June 1969) is a Serbian former basketball player who competed for Yugoslavia in the 1988 Summer Olympics. She was born in Bačka Topola.
