= Eva Kalužáková =

Czech basketball player

Personal information
- Nationality: Czech
- Born: 3 May 1965 (age 61) Strakonice, Czechoslovakia
- Height: 1.68 m (5 ft 6 in)

Sport
- Sport: Basketball

Eva Kalužáková (born 3 May 1965) is a Czech basketball player. She competed in the women's tournament at the 1988 Summer Olympics.
