= Ivana Nováková =

Czech basketball player

Personal information
- Nationality: Czech
- Born: 16 July 1965 (age 59); Hranice, Czechoslovakia

Sport
- Sport: Basketball

Ivana Nováková (born 16 July 1965) is a Czech basketball player. She competed in the women's tournament at the 1988 Summer Olympics.
