= Choi Kyung-hee =

South Korean basketball player

- Hangul: 최경희
- Hanja: 崔警姬
- RR: Choe Gyeonghui
- MR: Ch'oe Kyŏnghŭi

Choi Kyung-hee
Medal record

Women's basketball

Representing South Korea

Olympic Games
Silver medal – second place	1984 Los Angeles	National team

Asian Games
Gold medal – first place	1990 Beijing	National team
Silver medal – second place	1986 Seoul	National team

FIBA Asia Championship
Gold medal – first place	1984 Shanghai	National team
Gold medal – first place	1988 Hong Kong	National team
Silver medal – second place	1986 Kuala Lumpur	National team
Silver medal – second place	1990 Singapore	National team

FIBA U19 World Championship
Silver medal – second place	1985 Colorado Springs	National team

Choi Kyung-hee (Korean: 최경희; also transliterated Choi Gyeong-hui, born 25 February 1966) is a South Korean former basketball player who competed in the 1984 Summer Olympics and in the 1988 Summer Olympics.
