= Evladiya Slavcheva-Stefanova =

Bulgarian basketball player

Olympic medal record

Women's basketball

Representing Bulgaria
Silver medal – second place	1980 Moskva	Team competition

Evladiya Slavcheva-Stefanova (Bulgarian: Евладия Славчева-Стефанова; born 25 February 1962 in Pernik, Bulgaria) is a Bulgarian former basketball player who competed in the 1980 Summer Olympics and in the 1988 Summer Olympics.
