= Vesna Bajkuša =

Bosnian basketball player and coach

Personal information
- Born: 21 May 1970 (age 56) Sarajevo, SR Bosnia-Herzegovina, SFR Yugoslavia
- Listed height: 1.76 m (5 ft 9 in)
- Listed weight: 67 kg (148 lb)

Career information
- Playing career: 19??–19??
- Position: Shooting guard

Career history
- ?: Željezničar Sarajevo
Medals
Women's basketball
Representing (Socialist Federal Republic of Yugoslavia) Yugoslavia
European Championship
Silver medal – second place	1991 Tel Aviv
Olympic Games
Silver medal – second place	1988 Seoul
FIBA World Cup
Silver medal – second place	1990 Malaysia
Representing Bosnia and Herzegovina
Mediterranean Games
Gold medal – first place	1993 France

Vesna Bajkuša (born 21 May 1970 in Sarajevo) is a Bosnian basketball coach and former basketball player. She played as a defender won a silver medal playing for the Yugoslavian women's basketball team at the 1988 Seoul Olympics.

She later represented Bosnia and Herzegovina at the 1993 Mediterranean games, and won a gold.
