= Danira Bilić =

Croatian basketball player (born 1969)

Personal information
- Born: 22 July 1969 (age 57) Šibenik, SR Croatia, SFR Yugoslavia
- Listed height: 1.84 m (6 ft 0 in)
- Listed weight: 72 kg (159 lb)

Career information
- Playing career: 1985–1999
- Position: Shooting guard

Career history
- 1985–: Elemes Šibenik
- 1993–1995: Symel Tenerife
- 1995–1999: Croatia Zagreb
- FIBA Hall of Fame
Medals
Women's basketball
Representing Yugoslavia
European Championship
Silver medal – second place	1987 Madrid	Yugoslavia
Summer Olympics
Silver medal – second place	1988 Seoul	Yugoslavia
World Championship
Silver medal – second place	1990 Kuala Lumpur	Yugoslavia

Danira Bilić (née Nakić; born 22 July 1969) is a Croatian former basketball player. As part of the Yugoslavian women's team, she won a silver medal at the 1988 Seoul Olympics. She was European basketball's Most Valuable Player three times running, in 1988, 1989 and 1990. In 1991, she was awarded Croatia's highest national recognition for sports, the Franjo Bučar State Award for Sport.

She was announced to be honoured as a member of the 2024 Class of the FIBA Hall of Fame during the enshrinement ceremony in Singapore in September 2024.

Since retiring she has maintained an active involvement in sport, and is currently the Director of the Croatian Heritage Foundation. In 2009 the International Olympic Committee awarded her their "Women in Sports" European trophy.

She is also a politician, being a member of the Parliamentary Assembly of the Council of Europe

She is wife of former Croatian handball player Zvonimir Bilić.
