= Erika Dobrovičová-Buriánová =

Slovak basketball player (born 1967)

Erika Dobrovičová
Personal information
- Nationality: Slovak
- Born: 10 September 1967 (age 57); Prešov, Czechoslovakia

Sport
- Sport: Basketball

Erika Dobrovičová (born 10 September 1967) is a Slovak basketball player. She competed in the women's tournament at the 1988 Summer Olympics and the 1992 Summer Olympics.
