= Stojna Vangelovska =

Macedonian basketball player

Personal information
- Born: 5 February 1964 (age 62) Skopje, SR Macedonia, SFR Yugoslavia
- Listed height: 1.72 m (5 ft 8 in)
- Listed weight: 61 kg (134 lb)

Career information
- Playing career: 1980–1996
- Position: Shooting guard

Career history
- 1980–1983: Student Skopje
- 1983–1985: Partizan
- 1985–1991: Ježica
- 1991–1993: Panathinaikos
- 1993–1996: Tikveš Kavadarci
Medals
Women's basketball
Representing Yugoslavia
Olympic Games
Silver medal – second place	1988 Seul	Team
EuroBasket Women
Silver medal – second place	1987 Cádiz	Team
Universiade
Bronze medal – third place	1983 Edmonton	Team competition
Gold medal – first place	1987 Zagreb	Team competition

Stojna Vangelovska (Macedonian: Стојна Вангеловска, born 5 February 1964) is a Macedonian and former Yugoslav female professional basketball player.
