= Polona Dornik =

Yugoslav and Slovenian basketball player

Personal information
- Born: 20 November 1962 (age 63) Ljubljana, PR Slovenia, FPR Yugoslavia
- Listed height: 1.96 m (6 ft 5 in)
- Listed weight: 95 kg (209 lb)
- Position: Center

Career history
- Olimpija
- Ježica
- Celta de Vigo
Medals
Women's basketball
Representing Yugoslavia
Olympic Games
Silver medal – second place	1988 Seoul	Team competition

Polona Dornik (born 20 November 1962) is a Yugoslav and Slovenian former female professional basketball player.
