= Katrina McClain =

American basketball player (born 1965)

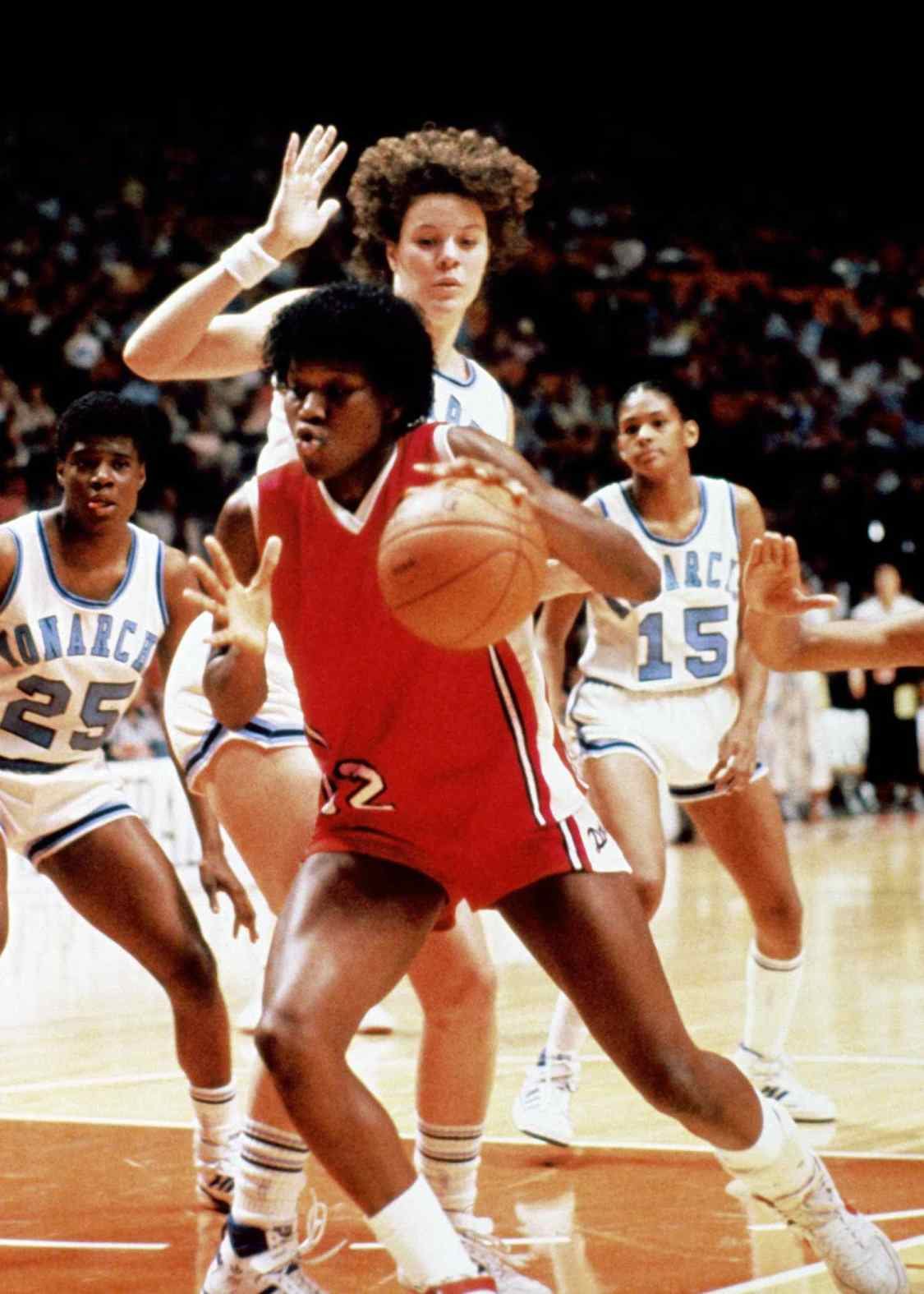
- McClain in 1995

Personal information
- Born: September 19, 1965 (age 61) Charleston, South Carolina, U.S.
- Listed height: 6 ft 1 in (1.85 m)
- Listed weight: 178 lb (81 kg)

Career information
- High school: St. Andrews (Charleston, South Carolina)
- College: Georgia
- Playing career: 1983–1987
- Position: Power forward

Career highlights
- Honda Sports Award (1986); WBCA Player of the Year (1987); 2× Kodak All-American (1986, 1987); National Player of the Year (1987); 2× USA Basketball Female Athlete of the Year (1988, 1992); SEC Tournament MVP (1986); SEC Freshman of the Year (1984)
- Stats at Basketball Reference
- Basketball Hall of Fame
- Women's Basketball Hall of Fame
Medals
Women's basketball
Representing the United States
Olympic Games
Gold medal – first place	1988 Seoul	Team competition
Gold medal – first place	1996 Atlanta	Team competition
Bronze medal – third place	1992 Barcelona	Team competition
FIBA World Championship
Gold medal – first place	1986 Soviet Union	Team competition
Gold medal – first place	1990 Malaysia	Team competition
Bronze medal – third place	1994 Australia	Team competition
Pan American Games
Bronze medal – third place	1991 Havana	Team
Gold medal – first place	1987 Indianapolis	Team
World University Games
Gold medal – first place	1985 Kobe	Team competition

Katrina Felicia McClain (born September 19, 1965) is an American former basketball player. She played for the University of Georgia, as well as many USA Basketball teams including three Olympic teams. McClain was inducted into the Women's Basketball Hall of Fame in 2006. She has been inducted into the Naismith Memorial Basketball Hall of Fame twice: in 2012 for her individual career, and in 2026 as a member of the 1996 United States women's Olympic basketball team.

== Early life ==
McClain grew up in Charleston, South Carolina, where she attended St. Andrews High School. In her senior year, she helped lead the team to a 30–0 record, including a state championship.

== College years ==
McClain began her career at the University of Georgia, where she was a two-time All-American (1986, 1987) and won varsity letters all four years. In her freshman year, she was named to the Freshman All-American team, and was the first ever SEC Freshman of the year. She went on to become the National Player of the Year in 1987. While she was at Georgia, the team won the SEC twice. The team earned invitations to the NCAA Tournament every year in each of her four years, reaching the Sweet Sixteen twice, the Elite Eight once, and finishing as the national runner up in 1985.

McClain is the holder of several single season records that still stand:

- Points (796)
- Points per game (24.9)
- Field goals made (310)
- Free throws made (176)
- Free throws attempted (240)

Over her four-year career, she hit 62% of her field goal attempts, a school record. In NCAA Tournament games, she holds the record for best field goal shooting percentage, hitting 60 of her 84 attempts in the 12 games she played (1984–1987). In the 1985 NCAA semi-final game against Western Kentucky, she hit 10 of 12 field goal attempts, a record field goal percentage for NCAA semi-final games.

Georgia compiled a record of 116–15 while McClain was on the team. She ranks second on Georgia's all-time career charts with 2,195 points (17.6 ppg) and 1,193 rebounds (9.5). Her jersey number (#32) was retired, making one of only three Lady Bulldogs to receive that honor.

=== Georgia statistics ===
Legend
GP	Games played	GS	Games started	MPG	Minutes per game
FG%	Field goal percentage	3P%	3-point field goal percentage	FT%	Free throw percentage
RPG	Rebounds per game	APG	Assists per game	SPG	Steals per game
BPG	Blocks per game	PPG	Points per game	**Bold**	Career high

Year	Team	GP	Points	FG%	FT%	RPG	APG	SPG	BPG	PPG
1983–84	Georgia	**33**	340	**.695**	.695	7.7	0.8	1.4	1.3	10.3
1984–85	Georgia	29	398	.626	.667	8.1	1.0	1.5	**3.0**	13.7
1985–86	Georgia	31	661	.662	**.778**	10.1	1.2	1.7	2.8	21.3
1986–87	Georgia	32	**796**	.562	.733	**12.2**	**1.6**	**1.8**	2.3	**24.9**
Career		125	2,195	.620	.729	9.5	1.2	1.6	2.3	17.6

== USA Basketball ==
McClain was a member of eleven USA basketball teams. She holds several records in international competitions including the USA Olympic record for rebounds (66) in a single competition and the USA Goodwill Games competition record for rebounds (54).

=== World University Games 1985 ===
While a sophomore at Georgia, McClain was selected for the team to represent the US at the 1985 World University Games, held in Kobe, Japan. McClain was the leading scorer in the first three games, including a 38-point output in the first game against the People's Republic of Korea, along with 13 rebounds. She would end up leading the team in scoring, with 17 points per game, rebounding, with almost eight per game and blocks with eleven. The team ended up with a 5–1 record, losing to the USSR in the title match. The USA team was down by 18 points at one time, fought back to close the margin, but ended up losing 87–81, to end up with the silver medal.

=== Goodwill Games 1986 ===
McClain was selected to represent the US at the inaugural Goodwill Games, held in Moscow in July 1986. North Carolina State's Kay Yow served as head coach. The team opened up with a 72–53 of Yugoslavia, and followed that with a 21-point win over Brazil 91–70. The third game was against Czechoslovakia and would be much closer. McClain was one of the scoring leaders in this game, scoring 12 points to help the US to a 78–70 victory. The USA faced Bulgaria in the semi-final match up, and again won, this time 67–58. This set up the final against the Soviet Union, led by 7-foot-2 Ivilana Semenova, considered the most dominant player in the world. The Soviet team had a 152–2 record in major international competition over the prior three decades, including an 84–82 win over the US in the 1983 World Championships. The Soviets held the early edge, leading 21–19 at one time, before the USA went on a scoring run to take a large lead they would never relinquish. The final score was 83–60 in favor of the US, earning the gold medal for the USA squad. McClain was the second leading scorer in the finals with 17 points, behind only Cheryl Miller with 18. For the entire event, McClain averaged eleven points, tied for third leading scorer with Anne Donovan.

=== World Championship 1986 ===
McClain continued to represent the US with National team at the 1986 World Championship, held in Moscow, a month after the Goodwill games in Moscow. The USA team was even more dominant this time. The early games were won easily, and the semifinal against Canada, while the closest game for the USA so far, ended up an 82–59 victory. McClain was one of the stars of the tournament, scoring a team high 19 points against Czechoslovakia, and a team high 21 points against Hungary. At the same time, the Soviet team was winning easily as well, and the final game pitted two teams each with 6–0 records. The Soviet team, having lost only once at home, wanted to show that the Goodwill games setback was a fluke. The USA team started by scoring the first eight points, and raced to a 45–23 lead, although the Soviets fought back and reduced the halftime margin to 13. The USA went on a 15–1 run in the second half to out the game away, and ended up winning the gold medal with a score of 108–88. McClain was one of five double-digit scorers in the game.

=== Pan American Games 1987 ===
McClain was a member of the USA team at the 1987 Pan American Games held in Indianapolis, Indiana USA. The USA team won their first game easily, then had a closer game against Brazil, winning 84–81. The next game was against Cuba, which again was a close match. The USA team was behind at the half, and trailed by seven in the second half, but came back to win 85–80. The title game was a rematch with Brazil. While Brazil's Hortência Marcari scored 30 points, McClain matched her output with 30 points of her own, helping the USA win gold with a 111–87 victory. McClain was the leading scorer (17.8) and rebounder(10) for the USA team.

=== Olympics 1988 ===
McClain represented the US at the 1988 Olympics in Seoul, Korea. The opening match against Czechoslovakia was not easy, with the USA team trailing at the half, but coming back in the second half to win 87–81. McClain scored 19 for the US, second most behind Teresa Edwards. The USA team went on to beat Yugoslavia and China, with McClain having a 27-point and 13 rebound game against China. The next match was against the USSR, a team the USA had beaten in recent competitions, but never in the Olympics, until this year, when the USA won a "surprisingly easy" game 102–88, with McClain scoring 26 points, only one fewer than Cynthia Cooper's 27. The gold medal game was a rematch against Yugoslavia, which the USA team won 77–70. McClain was the leading scorer and rebounder for the team, with 17.6 and 10.4 respectively.

=== World Championship 1990 ===
McClain continued her USA representation as a member of the USA National team at the 1990 World Championships, held in Kuala Lumpur, Malaysia. The team won their opening round games fairly easily, with the closest of the first three games a 27-point victory over Czechoslovakia. Then they faced Cuba, a team that had beaten the US in exhibition matches only a few weeks earlier. The USA team was losing at halftime, but came back to win 87–78. The USA team found itself behind at halftime to Canada in their next game, but came back to win easily 95–70. After an easy match against Bulgaria, the USA team faced Czechoslovakia again, end achieved an almost identical result, winning 87–59 with Teresa Edwards scoring 23 points, and McClain scoring 16. In the title match, McClain was the leading scorer with 23 points, and added nine rebounds, to help the USA team win the gold medal. For the entire event, McClain was the second leading scorer behind Teresa Edwards, and the leading rebounder on the team.

=== Goodwill Games 1990 ===
The 1990 Goodwill game were held in Seattle, Washington less than two weeks following the World Championships. The USA team had now won 36 consecutive games in major international competition, and hoped to continue the trend at the Goodwill Games. The team members and coaches on the USA were unchanged. The USA team struggled in its first two games, starting out behind to South Korea before winning, and falling behind to the Soviet team at halftime, before winning 86–78. McClain was the star of that game scoring 23 points and pulling down 16 rebounds. The team won against Australia and Bulgaria to face the Soviet team for the gold medal. The USA team won the gold medal with an 82–70 win over the Soviet team. McClain again led the team in rebounds at almost eleven per game, and was second in scoring honors, behind Teresa Edwards.

=== Pan American Games 1991 ===
McClain was a member of the USA team invited to the 1991 Pan American Games held in Havana, Cuba. The teams started with a strong performance against Canada, winning 87–70. The next game against Brazil started well, with the USA team jumping out to an 18–3 lead, which they extended to 26–8, but Brazil came back to take a halftime lead. The game was tied at 81 with just over two minutes left. Hortência Marcari scored in the final minute to give Brazil a three-point lead. McClain responded to bring the margin to one, but Brazil made free throws in the final seconds to secure the 87–84 upset. After beating Argentina easily, the USA team faced the host Cuba team, and won 91–71. That moved both teams to a rematch in the semi-finals, but this time Cuba would prevail. The USA team then went on to beat Canada for the bronze medal. McClain was the team's leading rebounder, with 8.8 per game, and the second leading scorer, at 15.3 per game, behind Teresa Edwards.

=== Olympics 1992 ===
McClain earned a place on the team representing the US at the 1992 Olympics in Barcelona, Spain. The team started out impressively, scoring 111 points in their opening match against Czechoslovakia, at that time, the most points ever scored by the USA Olympic team. They would best that mark four days later with 114 points against host team Spain. They also had a strong victory over China, winning 93–67, before facing the Unified team. The USA team fell behind by eleven points in the second half, rallied to take a small lead, but could not secure the victory, and ended up with a loss 79–73. The USA team beat Cuba 88–74 to win the bronze medal. McClain again dominated the boards, leading the team with 9.6 rebounds per game. She scored 11.4 points per game, which was fourth best on the team.

=== World Championship 1994 ===
McClain continued her participation on the USA team at the 1994 World Championships. The preliminary rounds were held in Hobart, Tasmania while the final rounds were in Sydney, Australia. McClain was the leading scorer with 20 points in the first round win over South Korea. The USA team won their first six games before playing Brazil in the semi-final match up. McClain had one of the most impressive performances in World Championship history, with 29 points and 19 rebounds. However, Brazil's Hortência Marcari also had a great game scoring 32 points, and the final score of 110–107 favored the Brazilian team. The USA team regrouped to beat the host Australia team 100–95 to take home the bronze medal. McClain led all scores on the USA team with 14.6 points per game and was the teams's leading rebounder, with 11.1 per game.

=== Olympics 1996 ===
McClain's final event as a member of the USA team was the 1996 Olympics, held in Atlanta, Georgia USA. The USA team won all their pool play games by large margins, although they were behind Cuba by as much as seven points before Lisa Leslie's 24 points, helped the USA take over the game. The USA victory over Australia featured a record setting 15 assists by Teresa Edwards, while McClain was the leading scorer with 24 points. Against Japan, Lisa Leslie set a USA Olympic scoring record with 35 points, and McClain tied a USA scoring record with 16 rebounds. In the final, the USA team faced 7–0 Brazil—a team that had beaten the USA squad in the 1991 Pan Am games and the 1994 World Championships. This time, playing before a home crowd of 32,987, the USA team started out very strong, hitting 71.9 per cent of their field goals leading to an eleven points margin at the half. The USA team scored the first eight points of the second half and won the gold medal 111–87. McClain was the second leading scorer (behind Lisa Leslie) and the team's leading rebounder.

== Professional career ==
McClain played professionally internationally for several years and ended her professional career with the Atlanta Glory of the American Basketball League (ABL). She was honored as a member of the 1998 ABL All-Star Game Eastern Conference Team.

- 1989–1991 Kyoto Petroleum (Japan)
- 1992 Sidis Ancona (Italy)
- 1993–1995 Valencia (Spain)
- 1995–1996 Galatasaray (Turkey)

== Legacy ==
The NCAA named the annual Katrina McClain Award in her honor, which recognizes the top power forward in women's NCAA Division I college basketball.

== Awards and honors ==
- 1986—Consensus All-America team
- 1987—Consensus All-America team
- 1987—National Player of the Year
- 1987—Winner of the Honda Sports Award for basketball
- 1987—WBCA Player of the Year
- 1988—USA Basketball's Female Athlete of the Year
- 1992—USA Basketball's Female Athlete of the Year
- 1997—Induction into University of Georgia Circle of Honor
- 2005—Induction into Georgia Sports Hall of Fame
- 2006—Induction into Women's Basketball Hall of Fame
- 2006—Induction into South Carolina Athletic Hall of Fame
- 2010—Induction into National High School Hall of Fame
- 2012—Induction into the Naismith Memorial Basketball Hall of Fame
