= Slađana Golić =

Yugoslav and Bosnian basketball player

Personal information
- Born: 12 February 1960 (age 66) Banja Luka, PR Bosnia-Herzegovina, FPR Yugoslavia
- Listed height: 1.89 m (6 ft 2 in)
- Listed weight: 75 kg (165 lb)
- Position: Center

Career history
- Mladi Krajišnik
- Santacler
- Vršac
- Pamplona
Medals
Women's basketball
Representing Yugoslavia
Summer Olympics
Silver medal – second place	1988 Seoul	Team competition
FIBA World Championship
Silver medal – second place	1990 Kuala Lumpur
EuroBasket
Silver medal – second place	1987 Cadiz
Silver medal – second place	1991 Tel Aviv
Universiade
Gold medal – first place	1987 Zagreb
Bronze medal – third place	1983 Edmonton

Slađana Golić (born 12 February 1960 in Banja Luka) is a former Yugoslav and Bosnian basketball player who participated at the 1984 and 1988 Summer Olympics.

She recently served as the president of the jury for the selection of the best athletes and sports organizations of Bosnia and Herzegovina of the year 2020, in the jubilee 20th edition, which was held online due to the COVID-19 pandemic in December of 2020.
