= Soviet Union at the 1988 Summer Olympics =

- Flag of the Soviet Union
- IOC code: URS
- NOC: Soviet Olympic Committee

in Seoul, South Korea 17 September 1988 – 2 October 1988
- Competitors: 481 (319 men, 162 women) in 27 sports
- Flag bearer: Aleksandr Karelin (wrestling)
- Medals Ranked 1st: Gold 55 Silver 31 Bronze 46 Total 132

Summer Olympics appearances (overview)
- 1952; 1956; 1960; 1964; 1968; 1972; 1976; 1980; 1984; 1988

Other related appearances
- Russian Empire (1900–1912); Estonia (1920–1936, 1992–pres.); Latvia (1924–1936, 1992–pres.); Lithuania (1924–1928, 1992–pres.); Unified Team (1992); Armenia (1994–pres.); Belarus (1994–2020); Georgia (1994–pres.); Kazakhstan (1994–pres.); Kyrgyzstan (1994–pres.); Moldova (1994–pres.); Russia (1994–2016); Ukraine (1994–pres.); Uzbekistan (1994–pres.); Azerbaijan (1996–pres.); Tajikistan (1996–pres.); Turkmenistan (1996–pres.); ROC (2020); Individual Neutral Athletes (2024)

The Soviet Union (USSR) competed, for the last time before its dissolution, at the 1988 Summer Olympics in Seoul, South Korea. 481 competitors, 319 men and 162 women, took part in 221 events in 27 sports. Athletes from 12 of the ex-Soviet republics would compete as the Unified Team at the 1992 Summer Olympics, and each nation would field independent teams in subsequent Games.

The Soviet Union dominated the medal count, winning 55 gold and 132 total medals. It is the largest Olympic medal tally in history achieved by a non-host nation. Currently, China's and the United States' 48 gold medals in 2008 and 2012 respectively, and the United States' 126 total medals in 2024 are the closest results to the USSR's 1988 performance. The Soviet Union medal tally currently ranks fourth both in terms of gold and total medals, after the United States' 1984 performance, the Soviet Union's 1980 performance, the United States' 1904 performance, and Great Britain's 1908 performance.

== Medalists ==
The Soviet Union finished first in the medal standings with 55 gold and 132 total medals.

Medal	Name	Sport	Event	Date
Gold	Irina Shilova	Shooting	Women's 10 metre air rifle	18 September
Gold	Nino Salukvadze	Shooting	Women's 25 metre pistol	19 September
Gold	Oksen Mirzoyan	Weightlifting	Men's 56 kg	19 September
Gold	Dmytro Monakov	Shooting	Trap	20 September
Gold	Kamandar Madzhidov	Wrestling	Men's Greco-Roman 62 kg	20 September
Gold	Aleksandr Kirichenko	Cycling	Men's track time trial	20 September
Gold	Vladimir Artyomov; Dmitry Bilozerchev; Lado Gogoladze; Sergey Kharkov; Valery Lyukin; Vladimir Novikov	Gymnastics	Men's artistic team all-around	20 September
Gold	Aleksandr Karelin	Wrestling	Men's Greco-Roman 130 kg	21 September
Gold	Svetlana Boginskaya; Svetlana Baitova; Natālija Laščonova; Yelena Shevchenko; Yelena Shushunova; Olga Strazheva	Gymnastics	Women's artistic team all-around	21 September
Gold	Vladimir Artyomov	Gymnastics	Men's artistic individual all-around	22 September
Gold	Levon Julfalakyan	Wrestling	Men's Greco-Roman 68 kg	22 September
Gold	Mikhail Mamiashvili	Wrestling	Men's Greco-Roman 82 kg	22 September
Gold	Gintautas Umaras	Cycling	Men's individual pursuit	22 September
Gold	Igor Polyansky	Swimming	Men's 200 metre backstroke	22 September
Gold	Afanasijs Kuzmins	Shooting	Men's 25 metre rapid fire pistol	23 September
Gold	Yelena Shushunova	Gymnastics	Women's artistic individual all-around	23 September
Gold	Sergey Kharkov	Gymnastics	Men's floor	24 September
Gold	Dmitry Bilozerchev	Gymnastics	Men's pommel horse	24 September
Gold	Dmitry Bilozerchev	Gymnastics	Men's rings	24 September
Gold	Vladimir Artyomov	Gymnastics	Men's parallel bars	24 September
Gold	Vladimir Artyomov	Gymnastics	Men's horizontal bar	24 September
Gold	Valery Lyukin	Gymnastics	Men's horizontal bar	24 September
Gold	Erika Salumäe	Cycling	Women's sprint	24 September
Gold	Artūras Kasputis; Dmitry Nelyubin; Gintautas Umaras; Mindaugas Umaras; Viatcheslav Ekimov	Cycling	Men's team pursuit	24 September
Gold	Israil Arsamakov	Weightlifting	Men's 82.5 kg	19 September
Gold	Svetlana Boginskaya	Gymnastics	Women's vault	25 September
Gold	Gennady Avdeyenko	Athletics	Men's high jump	25 September
Gold	Tatyana Samolenko	Athletics	Women's 3000 metres	25 September
Gold	Vladimir Salnikov	Swimming	Men's 1500 metre freestyle	25 September
Gold	Anatoly Khrapaty	Weightlifting	Men's 90 kg	25 September
Gold	Sergey Litvinov	Athletics	Men's hammer throw	26 September
Gold	Olga Bryzgina	Athletics	Women's 400 metres	26 September
Gold	Pavel Kuznetsov	Weightlifting	Men's 100 kg	26 September
Gold	Vladimer Aptsiauri; Anvar Ibragimov; Boris Koretsky; Ilgar Mamedov; Aleksandr Romankov	Fencing	Men's team foil	27 September
Gold	Yury Zakharevich	Weightlifting	Men's 110 kg	27 September
Gold	Sergey Bubka	Athletics	Men's pole vault	28 September
Gold	Aleksandr Kurlovich	Weightlifting	Men's +110 kg	29 September
Gold	Makharbek Khadartsev	Wrestling	Men's freestyle 90 kg	29 September
Gold	Soviet Union women's national volleyball team: Valentina Ogiyenko; Yelena Volkova; Marina Kumysh; Irina Smirnova; Tatyana Sidorenko; Irina Parkhomchuk; Tatyana Kraynova; Olga Shkurnova; Marina Nikulina; Yelena Ovchinnikova; Olga Krivosheyeva; Svetlana Korytova	Volleyball	Women's tournament	29 September
Gold	Nicolae Juravschi; Victor Reneischi	Canoeing	Men's C-2 500 metres	30 September
Gold	Vyacheslav Ivanenko	Athletics	Men's 50 kilometres walk	30 September
Gold	Soviet Union men's national basketball team: Aleksandr Volkov; Tiit Sokk; Sergey Tarakanov; Šarūnas Marčiulionis; Igors Miglinieks; Valery Tikhonenko; Rimas Kurtinaitis; Arvydas Sabonis; Viktor Pankrashkin; Valdemaras Chomičius; Aleksandr Belostenny; Valery Goborov	Basketball	Men's tournament	30 September
Gold	Olga Bondarenko	Athletics	Women's 10,000 metres	30 September
Gold	Marina Lobach	Gymnastics	Women's rhythmic individual all-around	30 September
Gold	Ivans Klementjevs	Canoeing	Men's C-1 1000 metres	1 October
Gold	Nicolae Juravschi; Victor Reneischi	Canoeing	Men's C-2 1000 metres	1 October
Gold	Natalya Lisovskaya	Athletics	Women's shot put	1 October
Gold	Viktor Bryzgin; Vladimir Krylov; Vladimir Muravyov; Vitaly Savin	Athletics	Men's 4 × 100 metres relay	1 October
Gold	Olga Bryzgina; Lyudmila Dzhigalova; Tatyana Ledovskaya; Olga Nazarova; Mariya Pinigina	Athletics	Women's 4 × 400 metres relay	1 October
Gold	Sergey Beloglazov	Wrestling	Men's freestyle 57 kg	1 October
Gold	Arsen Fadzayev	Wrestling	Men's freestyle 68 kg	1 October
Gold	Davit Gobejishvili	Wrestling	Men's freestyle 130 kg	1 October
Gold	Soviet Union men's national handball team: Aleksandr Tuchkin; Aleksandr Rymanov; Aleksandr Karshakevich; Yuri Nesterov; Georgi Sviridenko; Valery Gopin; Andrey Tyumentsev; Mikhail Vasilyev; Yuri Shevtsov; Andrey Lavrov; Vyacheslav Atavin; Valdemaras Novickis; Igor Chumak; Konstantin Sharovarov	Handball	Men's tournament	1 October
Gold	Soviet Union Olympic football team: Dmitry Kharin; Gela Ketashvili; Igor Sklyarov; Aleksey Cherednik; Arvydas Janonis; Yevgeny Kuznetsov; Igor Ponomaryov; Aleksandr Borodyuk; Igor Dobrovolsky; Vladimir Lyuty; Yevgeny Yarovenko; Sergey Fokin; Vladimir Tatarchuk; Oleksiy Mykhaylychenko; Viktor Losev; Sergey Gorlukovich; Yury Savichev; Arminas Narbekovas	Football	Men's tournament	1 October
Gold	Vyacheslav Yanovsky	Boxing	Light welterweight	2 October
Silver	Nino Salukvadze	Shooting	Women's 10 metre air pistol	21 September
Silver	Daulet Turlykhanov	Wrestling	Men's Greco-Roman 74 kg	21 September
Silver	Israel Militosyan	Weightlifting	Men's 67.5 kg	21 September
Silver	Valery Lyukin	Gymnastics	Men's artistic individual all-around	22 September
Silver	Yuri Bashkatov; Oleksiy Boryslavskiy; Raimundas Mažuolis; Gennady Prigoda; Vladimir Tkachenko; Nikolay Yevseyev	Swimming	Men's 4 × 100 metre freestyle relay	23 September
Silver	Vladimir Artyomov	Gymnastics	Men's floor	24 September
Silver	Valery Lyukin	Gymnastics	Men's parallel bars	24 September
Silver	Igor Lapshin	Athletics	Men's triple jump	24 September
Silver	Nikolay Kovsh	Cycling	Men's sprint	24 September
Silver	Yelena Dendeberova	Swimming	Women's 200 metre individual medley	24 September
Silver	Antonina Dumcheva; Inna Frolova; Irina Kalimbet; Svitlana Maziy	Rowing	Women's quadruple sculls	25 September
Silver	Veniamin But; Viktor Diduk; Aleksandr Dumchev; Pavel Gurkovsky; Mykola Komarov; Aleksandr Lukyanov; Viktor Omelyanovich; Vasily Tikhonov; Andrey Vasilyev	Rowing	Men's eight	25 September
Silver	Yelena Shushunova	Gymnastics	Women's balance beam	25 September
Silver	Svetlana Boginskaya	Gymnastics	Women's floor	25 September
Silver	Nail Mukhamedyarov	Weightlifting	Men's 90 kg	25 September
Silver	Yury Sedykh	Athletics	Men's hammer throw	26 September
Silver	Tõnu Tõniste; Toomas Tõniste	Sailing	Men's 470	27 September
Silver	Tatyana Ledovskaya	Athletics	Women's 400 metres hurdles	28 September
Silver	Rodion Gataullin	Athletics	Men's pole vault	28 September
Silver	Andrey Alshan; Mikhail Burtsev; Sergey Koryazhkin; Sergey Mindirgasov; Georgy Pogosov	Fencing	Men's team sabre	29 September
Silver	Vladimir Shestakov	Judo	Men's 86 kg	29 September
Silver	Stepan Sargsyan	Wrestling	Men's freestyle 62 kg	29 September
Silver	Mykhaylo Slivinsky	Canoeing	Men's C-1 500 metres	30 September
Silver	Viktor Denisov; Igor Nagayev	Canoeing	Men's K-2 500 metres	30 September
Silver	Adlan Varayev	Wrestling	Men's freestyle 74 kg	30 September
Silver	Leri Khabelovi	Wrestling	Men's freestyle 100 kg	30 September
Silver	Viktor Denisov; Sergey Kirsanov; Aleksandr Motuzenko; Igor Nagayev	Canoeing	Men's K-4 1000 metres	1 October
Silver	Laimutė Baikauskaitė	Athletics	Women's 1500 metres	1 October
Silver	Romas Ubartas	Athletics	Men's discus throw	1 October
Silver	Nurmagomed Shanavazov	Boxing	Light heavyweight	2 October
Silver	Soviet Union men's national volleyball team: Yury Panchenko; Andrey Kuznetsov; Vyacheslav Zaytsev; Igor Runov; Vladimir Shkurikhin; Yevgeny Krasilnikov; Raimonds Vilde; Valery Losev; Yury Sapega; Aleksandr Sorokalet; Yaroslav Antonov; Yury Cherednik	Volleyball	Men's tournament	2 October
Bronze	Anna Malukhina	Shooting	Women's 10 metre air rifle	18 September
Bronze	Ihar Basinski	Shooting	Men's 50 metre pistol	18 September
Bronze	Dmitry Volkov	Swimming	Men's 100 metre breaststroke	19 September
Bronze	Vladimir Popov	Wrestling	Men's Greco-Roman 90 kg	20 September
Bronze	Marina Dobrancheva	Shooting	Women's 10 metre air pistol	21 September
Bronze	Valentina Cherkasova	Shooting	Women's 50 metre rifle three positions	21 September
Bronze	Aleksandr Romankov	Fencing	Men's foil	21 September
Bronze	Vakhtang Iagorashvili	Modern pentathlon	Men's individual	22 September
Bronze	Dmitry Bilozerchev	Gymnastics	Men's artistic individual all-around	22 September
Bronze	Kirill Ivanov	Shooting	Men's 50 metre rifle three positions	22 September
Bronze	Svetlana Boginskaya	Gymnastics	Women's artistic individual all-around	23 September
Bronze	Gennadi Avramenko	Shooting	Men's 50 metre running target	23 September
Bronze	Oleksandr Marchenko; Vasily Yakusha	Rowing	Men's double sculls	24 September
Bronze	Aleksandr Kovalenko	Athletics	Men's triple jump	24 September
Bronze	Marat Ganeyev	Cycling	Men's points race	24 September
Bronze	Gennady Prigoda	Swimming	Men's 50 metre freestyle	24 September
Bronze	Igor Polyansky	Swimming	Men's 100 metre backstroke	24 September
Bronze	Andrey Shuvalov	Fencing	Men's épée	24 September
Bronze	Yelena Shushunova	Gymnastics	Women's uneven bars	25 September
Bronze	Rudolf Povarnitsyn	Athletics	Men's high jump	25 September
Bronze	Amiran Totikashvili	Judo	Men's 60 kg	25 September
Bronze	Vadim Yaroshchuk	Swimming	Men's 200 metre individual medley	25 September
Bronze	Valery Lozik; Konstantin Petrov; Igor Polyansky; Gennady Prigoda; Dmitry Volkov; Vadim Yaroshchuk; Nikolay Yevseyev; Sergey Zabolotnov	Swimming	Men's 4 × 100 metre medley relay	25 September
Bronze	Laima Zilporytė	Cycling	Women's individual road race	26 September
Bronze	Jüri Tamm	Athletics	Men's hammer throw	26 September
Bronze	Olga Nazarova	Athletics	Women's 400 metres	26 September
Bronze	Iryna Chunykhovska; Larisa Moskalenko	Sailing	Women's 470	27 September
Bronze	Giorgi Tenadze	Judo	Men's 71 kg	27 September
Bronze	Grigory Yegorov	Athletics	Men's pole vault	28 September
Bronze	Bashir Varayev	Judo	Men's 78 kg	28 September
Bronze	Soviet Union women's national basketball team: Olga Yevkova; Irina Gerlits; Olesya Barel; Irina Sumnikova; Olga Buryakina; Irina Minkh; Aleksandra Leonova; Yelena Khudashova; Vitalija Tuomaitė; Nataliya Zasulskaya; Galina Savitskaya; Olga Yakovleva	Basketball	Women's tournament	28 September
Bronze	Galina Chistyakova	Athletics	Women's long jump	29 September
Bronze	Sergey Karamchakov	Wrestling	Men's freestyle 48 kg	29 September
Bronze	Timofey Skryabin	Boxing	Flyweight	29 September
Bronze	Alex Miroshnichenko	Boxing	Super heavyweight	29 September
Bronze	Soviet Union women's national handball team: Natalya Mitryuk; Larisa Karlova; Svetlana Mankova; Zinaida Turchina; Olga Semyonova; Marina Bazanova; Natalya Morskova; Yevgeniya Tovstogan; Nataliya Rusnachenko; Yelena Nemashkalo; Tatyana Dzhandzhgava; Natalya Anisimova; Elina Guseva; Natalya Lapitskaya; Tatyana Gorb	Handball	Women's tournament	29 September
Bronze	Pavel Kolobkov; Vladimir Reznichenko; Andrey Shuvalov; Igor Tikhomirov; Mikhail Tishko	Fencing	Men's team épée	30 September
Bronze	Tamara Bykova	Athletics	Women's high jump	30 September
Bronze	Yelena Zhupiyeva	Athletics	Women's 10,000 metres	30 September
Bronze	Vladimir Yesheyev	Archery	Men's individual	30 September
Bronze	Volodymyr Tohuzov	Wrestling	Men's freestyle 52 kg	30 September
Bronze	Aleksandra Timoshenko	Gymnastics	Women's rhythmic individual all-around	30 September
Bronze	Tatyana Samolenko	Athletics	Women's 1500 metres	1 October
Bronze	Lyudmila Kondratyeva; Galina Malchugina; Nataliya Pomoshchnikova; Marina Zhirova	Athletics	Women's 4 × 100 metres relay	1 October
Bronze	Soviet Union men's national water polo team: Yevgeny Sharonov; Nurlan Mendygaliyev; Yevgeny Grishin; Aleksandr Kolotov; Sergey Naumov; Viktor Berendyuga; Sergey Kotenko; Dmitry Apanasenko; Giorgi Mshvenieradze; Mikhail Ivanov; Serghei Marcoci; Nikolay Smirnov; Mikheil Giorgadze	Water polo	Men's tournament	1 October
Bronze	Grigory Verichev	Judo	Men's +95 kg	1 October

Medals by sport
Sport	1st place, gold medalist(s)	2nd place, silver medalist(s)	3rd place, bronze medalist(s)	Total
Archery	0	0	1	1
Athletics	10	6	10	26
Basketball	1	0	1	2
Boxing	1	1	2	4
Canoeing	3	3	0	6
Cycling	4	1	2	7
Fencing	1	1	3	5
Football	1	0	0	1
Gymnastics	12	5	4	21
Handball	1	0	1	2
Judo	0	1	4	5
Modern Pentathlon	0	0	1	1
Rowing	0	2	1	3
Sailing	0	1	1	2
Shooting	4	1	6	11
Swimming	2	2	5	9
Volleyball	1	1	0	2
Water Polo	0	0	1	1
Weightlifting	6	2	0	8
Wrestling	8	4	3	15
Total	55	31	46	132

== Competitors ==
The following is the list of number of competitors in the Games.

Sport	Men	Women	Total
Archery	3	3	6
Athletics	39	44	85
Basketball	12	12	24
Boxing	12	–	12
Canoeing	12	5	17
Cycling	14	4	18
Diving	4	4	8
Equestrian	6	2	8
Fencing	15	5	20
Field hockey	15	0	15
Football	18	–	18
Gymnastics	6	8	14
Handball	14	15	29
Judo	7	–	7
Modern pentathlon	3	–	3
Rowing	30	23	53
Sailing	13	2	15
Shooting	17	6	23
Swimming	19	8	27
Synchronized swimming	–	3	3
Table tennis	2	3	5
Tennis	4	3	6
Volleyball	12	12	24
Water polo	13	–	13
Weightlifting	9	–	9
Wrestling	20	–	20
Total	321	162	483

== Archery ==
Women's Individual Competition:

- Lioudmila Arjannikova – final, 4th place
- T. Mountain – final, 8th place
- N. Boutouzova – quarterfinal, 18th place

Men's Individual Competition:

- Vladimir Echeev – final, bronze medal
- K. Chkolny – 1/8 final, 20th place
- Juri Leontiev – preliminary round, 29th place

Women's tournament:

- Arjannikova, Mountain and Boutouzova – final, 4th place

Men's tournament:

- Echeev, Chkolny and Leontiev – final, 5th place

== Athletics ==
=== Men's competition ===
Men's Marathon

- Ravil Kashapov

- Final — 2:13.49 (→ 10th place)

Men's long jump

- Leonid Volochine

- Qualification — 7.89m
- Final — 7.89m (→ 8th place)

- Robert Emmiyan

- Qualification — DNF (→ did not advance)

- Vladimir Ochkan

- Qualification — DNS (→ did not advance)

Men's discus throw

- Romas Ubartas

- Qualification – 65.58m
- Final – 67.48m (→ Silver medal)

- Yuriy Dumchev

- Qualification – 62.08m
- Final – 66.42m (→ 4th place)

- Vaclavas Kidykas

- Qualification – 60.88m (→ did not advance)

Men's shot put

- Sergey Smirnov

- Qualification — 20.48m
- Final — 20.36m (→ 8th place)

Men's Hammer Throw

- Sergey Litvinov

- Qualification — 81.24m
- Final — 84.80m (→ Gold medal)

- Yuriy Sedykh

- Qualification — 78.48m
- Final — 83.76m (→ Silver medal)

- Jüri Tamm

- Qualification — 69.68m
- Final — 81.16m (→ Bronze medal)

Men's javelin throw

- Viktor Yevsyukov

- Qualification — 79.26m
- Final — 82.32m (→ 5th place)

- Vladimir Ovchinnikov

- Qualification — 80.26m
- Final — 79.12m (→ 7th place)

Men's decathlon

- Pavel Tarnovetskiy — 8167 points (→ 10th place)

1. 100 metres — 11.23s
2. Long Jump — 7.28m
3. Shot Put — 15.25m
4. High Jump — 1.97m
5. 400 metres — 48.60s
6. 110m Hurdles — 14.76s
7. Discus Throw — 48.02m
8. Pole Vault — 5.20m
9. Javelin Throw — 59.48m
10. 1.500 metres — 4:52.24s

Men's 20 km Walk

- Mikhail Shchennikov

- Final — 1:20:47 (→ 6th place)

- Aleksey Pershin

- Final — 1:22:32 (→ 14th place)

- Yevgeniy Misyulya

- Final — 1:24:39 (→ 27th place)

Men's 50 km Walk

- Vyacheslav Ivanenko

- Final — 3:38:29 (→ Gold medal)

- Aleksandr Potashov

- Final — 3:41:00 (→ 4th place)

- Vitaliy Popovych

- Final — 3:59:23 (→ 26th place)

=== Women's competition ===
Women's 4 × 400 m Relay

- Lyudmila Dzhigalova, Olga Nazarova, Mariya Pinigina and Olga Bryzgina

- Heat — 3:27.14

- Tatyana Ledovskaya, Olga Nazarova, Mariya Pinigina and Olga Bryzgina

- Final — 3:15.18 (→ Gold medal)

Women's Marathon

- Tatyana Polovinskaya

- Final — 2:27.05 (→ 4th place)

- Zoya Ivanova

- Final — 2:30.25 (→ 9th place)

- Raisa Smekhnova

- Final — 2:33.19 (→ 16th place)

Women's discus throw

- Ellina Zvereva

- Qualification – 63.26m
- Final – 68.94m (→ 5th place)

- Larisa Mikhalchenko

- Qualification – 64.32m
- Final – 64.08m (→ 10th place)

- Galina Murasova

- Qualification – 62.54m
- Final – NM (→ no ranking)

Women's javelin throw

- Irina Kostyuchenkova

- Qualification – 63.24m
- Final – 67.00m (→ 4th place)

- Natalya Yermolovich

- Qualification – 64.44m
- Final – 64.84m (→ 6th place)

Women's shot put

- Natalya Lisovskaya

- Qualification – 19.78m
- Final – 22.24m (→ Gold medal)

- Natalya Akhrimenko

- Qualification – 19.40m
- Final – 20.13m (→ 7th place)

- Valentina Fedjuschina

- Qualification – 19.06m (→ did not advance)

Women's Heptathlon

- Natalya Shubenkova

- Final Result — 6540 points (→ 4th place)

- Remigija Sablovskaitė

- Final Result — 6456 points (→ 5th place)

- Svetlana Buraga

- Final Result — 6232 points (→ 10th place)

== Basketball ==
=== Men's tournament ===
Team roster

The following is the Soviet Union roster in the men's basketball tournament of the 1988 Summer Olympics.

Soviet Union men's national basketball team – 1988 Summer Olympics roster
Players
Coaches

Pos.	No.	Name	Age – Date of birth	Height	Club	Ctr.
F/C	4	Alexander Volkov	24 – 29 March 1964	2.08 m (6 ft 10 in)	PBC CSKA Moscow	(Soviet Union)
PG	5	Tiit Sokk	23 – 15 November 1964	1.91 m (6 ft 3 in)	KK Kalev	(Soviet Union)
F	6	Sergei Tarakanov	30 – 25 April 1958	2.03 m (6 ft 8 in)	PBC CSKA Moscow	(Soviet Union)
SG	7	Šarūnas Marčiulionis	24 – 13 June 1964	1.96 m (6 ft 5 in)	BC Statyba	(Soviet Union)
G	8	Igors Miglinieks	24 – 4 May 1964	1.94 m (6 ft 4 in)	PBC CSKA Moscow	(Soviet Union)
F	9	Valeri Tikhonenko	24 – 19 August 1964	2.06 m (6 ft 9 in)	BC SKA Alma-Ata	(Soviet Union)
SG	10	Rimas Kurtinaitis	28 – 15 May 1960	1.96 m (6 ft 5 in)	BC Žalgiris	(Soviet Union)
C	11	Arvydas Sabonis	23 – 19 December 1964	2.20 m (7 ft 3 in)	BC Žalgiris	(Soviet Union)
C	12	Viktor Pankrashkin	30 – 10 December 1957	2.20 m (7 ft 3 in)	PBC CSKA Moscow	(Soviet Union)
PG	13	Valdemaras Chomičius	29 – 4 May 1959	1.92 m (6 ft 4 in)	BC Žalgiris	(Soviet Union)
C	14	Alexander Belostenny	29 – 24 February 1959	2.14 m (7 ft 0 in)	BC Budivelnyk	(Soviet Union)
C	15	Valery Goborov	22 – 20 January 1966	2.11 m (6 ft 11 in)	PBC CSKA Moscow	(Soviet Union)

Head coach

Alexander Gomelsky

Legend

- Club – describes last
  club before the tournament
- Age – describes age
  on 17 September 1988

Group play

Pos	Team	Pld	W	L	PF	PA	PD	Pts	Qualification
1	Yugoslavia	5	4	1	468	384	+84	9 (Note: Head-to-head record: Yugoslavia 1–0 Soviet Union)	Quarterfinals
2	Soviet Union	5	4	1	460	393	+67	9	Quarterfinals
3	Australia	5	3	2	429	408	+21	8 (Note: Head-to-head record: Australia 1–0 Puerto Rico)	Quarterfinals
4	Puerto Rico	5	3	2	382	387	−5	8	Quarterfinals
5	Central African Republic	5	1	4	346	436	−90	6	9th–12th classification round
6	South Korea (H)	5	0	5	384	461	−77	5	9th–12th classification round

Source: FIBA archive
Rules for classification: 1) points; 2) head-to-head points; 3) head-to-head goal average; 4) head-to-head number of points scored.
(H) Hosts
Notes:

18 September 1988

Soviet Union	79–92	Yugoslavia
Scoring by half: 33–39, 46–53

Jamsil Gymnasium, Seoul

20 September 1988

Australia	69–91	Soviet Union
Scoring by half: 35–53, 34–38

Jamsil Gymnasium, Seoul

21 September 1988

Puerto Rico	81–93 (OT)	Soviet Union
Scoring by half: 39–37, 37–39 Overtime: 5–17

Jamsil Gymnasium, Seoul

23 September 1988

South Korea	73–110	Soviet Union
Scoring by half: 38–59, 35–51

Jamsil Gymnasium, Seoul

24 September 1988

Central African Republic	78–87	Soviet Union
Scoring by half: 31–40, 47–47

Jamsil Gymnasium, Seoul

Quarterfinals

26 September 1988
19:30

Boxscore

Soviet Union	110–105	Brazil
Scoring by half: 53–58, 57–47
Pts: Kurtinaitis 24; Rebs: Sabonis 9 Asts: Sabonis, Tarakanov, Volkov 2		Pts: Schmidt 46; Rebs: Israel 11; Asts: Maury 5

Jamsil Gymnasium, Seoul

Semifinals

28 September 1988
12:00

Boxscore

United States	76–82	Soviet Union
Scoring by half: 37–47, 39–35
Pts: Robinson 19; Rebs: Robinson 12; Asts: Coles 2		Pts: Kurtinaitis 28; Rebs: Sabonis 13; Asts: Volkov 5

Jamsil Gymnasium, Seoul

Gold medal match

30 September 1988

Boxscore

Yugoslavia	63–76	Soviet Union
Scoring by half: 28–31, 35–45
Pts: Petrović 24; Rebs: Divac 7 Asts: Petrović 4		Pts: Marčiulionis 21; Rebs: Sabonis 15; Asts: Marčiulionis 6

Jamsil Gymnasium, Seoul

=== Women's tournament ===
Team roster

The following is the Soviet Union roster in the women's basketball tournament of the 1988 Summer Olympics.

Soviet Union women's national basketball team – 1988 Summer Olympics roster
Players
Coaches

Pos.	No.	Name	Age – Date of birth	Height	Club	Ctr.
	4	Olga Yevkova	23 – 15 July 1965
	5	Irina Gerlits	22 – 29 April 1966
	6	Olesya Barel	28 – 9 February 1960			(Hungary)
G	7	Irina Sumnikova	23 – 15 October 1964	1.70 m (5 ft 7 in)		(Soviet Union)
	8	Olga Buryakina	30 – 17 March 1958
	9	Olga Yakovleva	24 – 15 December 1963
	10	Irina Minkh	24 – 16 April 1964			(Soviet Union)
	11	Aleksandra Leonova	24 – 4 September 1964
C	12	Yelena Khudashova	23 – 10 July 1965	1.95 m (6 ft 5 in)		(Italy)
	13	Vitalija Tuomaitė	23 – 22 November 1964
C	14	Natalya Zasulskaya	19 – 28 May 1969	1.91 m (6 ft 3 in)		(Soviet Union)
	15	Galina Savitskaya	27 – 13 July 1961			(Spain)

Head coach

Leonid Yachmenev

Legend

- Club – describes last
  club before the tournament
- Age – describes age
  on 17 September 1988

Group play

Pos	Team	Pld	W	L	PF	PA	PD	Pts	Qualification
1	Australia	3	2	1	178	196	−18	5 (Note: Head-to-head record: Australia 1–0 Soviet Union)	Semifinals
2	Soviet Union	3	2	1	208	188	+20	5	Semifinals
3	Bulgaria	3	1	2	217	241	−24	4 (Note: Head-to-head record: Bulgaria 1–0 South Korea)	Classification round
4	South Korea (H)	3	1	2	244	222	+22	4	Classification round

Source: FIBA
Rules for classification: 1) points; 2) head-to-head points; 3) head-to-head goal average; 4) head-to-head number of points scored.
(H) Hosts
Notes:

19 September 1988
11:45

Boxscore

Bulgaria	62–91	Soviet Union
Scoring by half: 26–50, 36–41
Pts: Dermendzhieva, Staneva 17; Rebs: Staneva 6 Asts: Slavcheva 3		Pts: Zasulskaya 23; Rebs: Yakovleva, Zasulskaya 10; Asts: Minkh 4

Jamsil Gymnasium, Seoul

22 September 1988
11:45

Boxscore

South Korea	66–69	Soviet Union
Scoring by half: 35–33, 31–36
Pts: Choi 20; Rebs: Sung 14		Pts: Savitskaya 18; Rebs: Savitskaya 6 Asts: Sumnikova 2

Jamsil Gymnasium, Seoul

25 September 1988
21:30

Boxscore

Australia	60–48	Soviet Union
Scoring by half: 30–30, 30–18
Pts: Maher 20; Rebs: Maher 8 Asts: Maher 6		Pts: Yakovleva 13; Rebs: 4 players 4 Asts: Minkh 2

Jamsil Gymnasium, Seoul

Semifinals

27 September 1988
11:45

Boxscore

United States	102–88	Soviet Union
Scoring by half: 50–39, 52–49
Pts: Cooper 27; Rebs: McClain 15; Asts: Edwards 6		Pts: Zasulskaya 16; Rebs: Tuomaitė 6 Asts: Yakovleva 2

Jamsil Gymnasium, Seoul

Bronze medal match

28 September 1988
21:30

Boxscore

Australia	53–68	Soviet Union
Scoring by half: 21–32, 32–36
Pts: Maher 22; Rebs: Maher, Timms 3 Asts: Maher 4		Pts: Savitskaya 16; Rebs: Yakovleva 7 Asts: Buryakina 2

Jamsil Gymnasium, Seoul

== Boxing ==
Men's Light Flyweight (– 48 kg)

- Alexander Makhmutov

- First Round — Bye
- Second Round — Defeated Carlos Eluaiza (Argentina), 5:0
- Third Round — Defeated Jesus Beltre (Dominican Republic), 4:1
- Quarterfinals — Lost to Ivailo Marinov (Bulgaria), 0:5

Men's Flyweight (– 51 kg)

- Timofey Skryabin

Men's Bantamweight (– 54 kg)

- Aleksandr Artemyev

Men's Featherweight (– 57 kg)

- Mekhak Ghazaryan

Men's Lightweight (– 60 kg)

- Kostya Tszyu

Men's Light-Welterweight (– 63.5 kg)

- Vyacheslav Yanovsky

Men's Welterweight (– 67 kg)

- Vladimir Yereshchenko

Men's Light-Middleweight (– 71 kg)

- Yevgeni Zaytsev

Men's Middleweight (– 75 kg)

- Ruslan Taramov

Men's Light-Heavyweight (– 81 kg)

- Nurmagomed Shanavazov

Men's Heavyweight (– 91 kg)

- Ramzan Sebiyev

Men's Super-Heavyweight (+ 91 kg)

- Alex Miroshnichenko

== Cycling ==
Eighteen cyclists, fourteen men and four women, represented the Soviet Union in 1988.

Men's road race

- Djamolidine Abdoujaparov
- Asiat Saitov
- Riho Suun

Men's team time trial

- Vasily Zhdanov
- Viktor Klimov
- Asiat Saitov
- Igor Sumnikov

Men's sprint

- Nikolai Kovsh

Men's 1 km time trial

- Aleksandr Kirichenko

Men's individual pursuit

- Gintautas Umaras

Men's team pursuit

- Viatcheslav Ekimov
- Artūras Kasputis
- Dmitry Nelyubin
- Gintautas Umaras
- Mindaugas Umaras

Men's points race

- Marat Ganeyev

Women's road race

- Laima Zilporytė — 2:00:52 (→ Bronze medal)
- Valentina Yevpak — 2:00:52 (→ 5th place)
- Alla Jakovleva — 2:00:52 (→ 34th place)

Women's sprint

- Erika Salumäe

== Diving ==
Men

Athlete	Event	Preliminary		Final	
Athlete	Event	Points	Rank	Points	Rank
Aleksandr Portnov	3 m springboard	561.81	12 Q	563.37	10
Valery Goncharov	3 m springboard	570.63	11 Q	554.16	12
Giorgi Chogovadze	10 m platform	540.90	7 Q	585.96	4
Vladimir Timoshinin	10 m platform	570.75	4 Q	534.66	8

Women

Athlete	Event	Preliminary		Final	
Athlete	Event	Points	Rank	Points	Rank
Irina Lashko	3 m springboard	488.43	3 Q	526.65	4
Marina Babkova	3 m springboard	456.42	8 Q	506.43	5
Anzhela Stasyulevich	10 m platform	401.04	5 Q	386.22	4
Yelena Miroshina	10 m platform	399.27	6 Q	381.93	6

== Equestrian ==
Men's show jump team

- Raimundas Udrakis

== Fencing ==
20 fencers, 15 men and 5 women, represented the Soviet Union in 1988.

Men's foil

- Aleksandr Romankov
- Ilgar Mamedov
- Boris Koretsky

Men's team foil

- Aleksandr Romankov, Ilgar Mamedov, Vladimer Aptsiauri, Anvar Ibragimov, Boris Koretsky

Men's épée

- Andrey Shuvalov
- Wladimir Reznitschenko
- Mykhailo Tyshko

Men's team épée

- Andrey Shuvalov, Pavel Kolobkov, Wladimir Reznitschenko, Mykhailo Tyshko, Igor Tikhomirov

Men's sabre

- Heorhiy Pohosov
- Andrey Alshan
- Sergey Mindirgasov

Men's team sabre

- Sergey Mindirgasov, Mikhail Burtsev, Heorhiy Pohosov, Andrey Alshan, Sergey Koryashkin

Women's foil

- Tatyana Sadovskaya
- Yelena Glikina
- Olga Voshchakina

Women's team foil

- Yelena Glikina, Yelena Grishina, Tatyana Sadovskaya, Marina Soboleva, Olga Voshchakina

== Hockey ==
=== Men's tournament ===
- Preliminary round (group B)

- Soviet Union – India 1–0
- Soviet Union – South Korea 3–1
- Soviet Union – Canada 0–0
- Soviet Union – Great Britain 1–3
- Soviet Union – West Germany 0–6

- Classification Matches

- 5th–8th place: Soviet Union – Pakistan 0–1
- 7th–8th place: Soviet Union – Argentina 4–1 (→ 7th place)

- Team roster

- (01.) Vladimir Pleshakov (gk)
- (02.) Viktor Deputatov
- (03.) Igor Yulchiev
- (04.) Sos Hayrapetyan
- (05.) Vladimir Antakov (captain)
- (06.) Vyacheslav Chechenev
- (07.) Igor Atanov
- (08.) Sergei Chakhvorostov
- (09.) Sergei Pleshakov
- (10.) Mikhail Nechipurenko
- (11.) Alexander Domachev (gk)
- (12.) Igor Davydov
- (13.) Aleksandr Miasnikov
- (14.) Yevgeni Nechaev
- (15.) Mikhail Bukatin

- Head coach: Leonid Pavlovsky

== Modern pentathlon ==
Three male pentathletes represented the Soviet Union in 1988. Vaho Iagorashvili won a bronze in the individual event.

Individual

- Vaho Iagorashvili
- German Yuferov
- Anatoly Avdeyev

Team

- Vaho Iagorashvili
- German Yuferov
- Anatoly Avdeyev

== Rowing ==
The Soviet Union had 30 male and 23 female rowers participate in all 14 rowing events in 1988.

Men's competition
Men's single sculls

- Jüri Jaanson

Men's double sculls

- Oleksandr Marchenko
- Vasil Yakusha

Men's coxless pair

- Igor Zuborenko
- Valery Vyrvich

Men's coxed pair

- Andrey Korikov
- Roman Kazantsev
- Andrey Lipsky (cox)

Men's quadruple sculls

- Pavel Krupko
- Oleksandr Zaskalko
- Sergey Kinyakin
- Yuriy Zelikovich

Men's coxless four

- Ivan Vysotskiy
- Sergey Smirnov
- Yuriy Pimenov
- Nikolay Pimenov

Men's coxed four

- Sigitas Kučinskas
- Jonas Narmontas
- Vladimir Romanishin
- Igor Zotov
- Sergey Titov (cox)

Men's eight

- Veniamin But
- Mykola Komarov
- Vasily Tikhonov
- Aleksandr Dumchev
- Pavlo Hurkovskiy
- Viktor Diduk
- Viktor Omelyanovich
- Andrey Vasilyev
- Aleksandr Lukyanov (cox)

Women's competition
Women's single sculls

- Nataliya Kvasha

Women's double sculls

- Marina Zhukova
- Mariya Omelianovych

Women's coxless pair

- Sarmīte Stone
- Marina Smorodina

Women's quadruple sculls

- Irina Kalimbet
- Svitlana Maziy
- Inna Frolova
- Antonina Zelikovich

Women's coxed four

- Reda Ribinskaitė
- Elena Tereshina
- Irina Teterina
- Marina Suprun
- Valentina Khokhlova (cox)

Women's eight

- Margarita Teselko
- Marina Znak
- Nadezhda Sugako
- Sandra Brazauskaitė
- Olena Pukhaieva
- Sariya Zakyrova
- Nataliya Fedorenko
- Lidiya Averyanova
- Aušra Gudeliūnaitė (cox)

== Swimming ==
Men's 50 m Freestyle

- Gennadiy Prigoda
  1. Heat – 22.57
  2. Final – 22.71 (→ Bronze medal)
- Vladimir Tkachenko
  1. Heat – 22.81
  2. Final – 22.88 (→ 6th place)

Men's 100 m Freestyle

- Gennadiy Prigoda
  1. Heat – 50.13
  2. Final – 49.75 (→ 4th place)
- Yuri Bashkatov
  1. Heat – 50.08
  2. Final – 50.08 (→ 5th place)

Men's 200 m Freestyle

- Alexei Kouznetsov
  1. Heat – 1:50.84
  2. B-Final – 1:51.03 (→ 12th place)
- Yuri Bashkatov
  1. Heat – 1:52.04 (→ did not advance, 22nd place)

Men's 400 m Freestyle

- Alexandre Bazanov
  1. Heat – 3:58.74 (→ did not advance, 27th place)

Men's 1500 m Freestyle

- Vladimir Salnikov
  1. Heat – 15:07.83
  2. Final – 15:00.40 (→ Gold medal)

Men's 100 m Backstroke

- Igor Polyansky
  1. Heat – 55.04
  2. Final – 55.20 (→ Bronze medal)
- Serguei Zabolotnov
  1. Heat – 56.13
  2. Final – 55.37 (→ 4th place)

Men's 200 m Backstroke

- Igor Polyansky
  1. Heat – 2:01.70
  2. Final – 1:59.37 (→ Gold medal)
- Serguei Zabolotnov
  1. Heat – 2:01.27
  2. Final – 2:00.52 (→ 4th place)

Men's 100 m Breaststroke

- Dmitry Volkov
  1. Heat – 1:02.49
  2. Final – 1:02.20 (→ Bronze medal)
- Alexei Matveev
  1. Heat – 1:03.25
  2. B-Final – 1:03.01 (→ 9th place)

Men's 200 m Breaststroke

- Valeri Lozik
  1. Heat – 2:16.31
  2. Final – 2:16.16 (→ 5th place)
- Vadim Alexeev
  1. Heat – 2:17.15
  2. B-Final – 2:16.70 (→ 6th place)

Men's 100 m Butterfly

- Vadim Yaroshchuk
  1. Heat – 54.17
  2. Final – 54.60 (→ 8th place)
- Konstantine Petrov
  1. Heat – 55.84 (→ did not advance, 23rd place)

Men's 200 m Butterfly

- Vadim Yaroshchuk
  1. Heat – 2:01.05
  2. B-Final – 2:00.34 (→ 11th place)

Men's 200 m Individual Medley

- Vadim Yaroshchuk
  1. Heat – 2:02.77
  2. Final – 2:02.40 (→ Bronze medal)
- Mikhail Zoubkov
  1. Heat – 2:03.79
  2. Final – 2:02.92 (→ 4th place)

Men's 400 m Individual Medley

- Mikhail Zoubkov
  1. Heat – 4:25.30
  2. B-Final – 4:25.44 (→ 13th place)

Men's 4 × 100 m Freestyle Relay

- Raimundas Mažuolis, Alexei Borislavski, Nikolai Evseev and Vladimir Tkachenko
  1. Heat – 3:19.89
- Gennadiy Prigoda, Yuri Bashkatov, Nikolai Evseev and Vladimir Tkachenko
  1. Final – 3:18.33 (→ Silver medal)

Men's 4 × 200 m Freestyle Relay

- Serguei Kouriaev, Alexandre Bazanov, Nikolai Evseev and Aleksei Kouznetsov
  1. Heat – DSQ (→ did not advance, no ranking)

Men's 4 × 100 m Medley Relay

- Serguei Zabolotnov, Valeri Lozik, Konstantine Petrov and Nikolai Evseev
  1. Heat – 3:45.29
- Igor Polyansky, Dmitry Volkov, Vadim Yaroshchuk and Gennadiy Prigoda
  1. Final – 3:39.96 (→ Bronze medal)

Women's 50 m Freestyle

- Inna Abramova
  1. Heat – 26.27
  2. B-Final – 26.48 (→ 14th place)

Women's 100 m Freestyle

- Natalia Trefilova
  1. Heat – 56.66
  2. B-Final – 56.48 (→ 9th place)
- Svetlana Issakova
  1. Heat – 57.17
  2. B-Final – 57.07 (→ 15th place)

Women's 200 m Freestyle

- Natalia Trefilova
  1. Heat – 2:00.54
  2. Final – 1:59.24 (→ 5th place)

Women's 400 m Freestyle

- Natalia Trefilova
  1. Heat – 4:12.20
  2. Final – 4:13.92 (→ 8th place)

Women's 800 m Freestyle

- Natalia Trefilova
  1. Heat – 8:43.19 (→ did not advance, 15th place)

Women's 100 m Breaststroke

- Yelena Volkova
  1. Heat – 1:09.86
  2. Final – 1:09.24 (→ 5th place)
- Svetlana Kouzmina
  1. Heat – 1:10.83
  2. B-Final – 1:10.42 (→ 9th place)

Women's 200 m Breaststroke

- Yulia Bogatcheva
  1. Heat – 2:28.94
  2. Final – 2:28.54 (→ 5th place)
- Svetlana Kouzmina
  1. Heat – 2:30.93
  2. B-Final – 2:30.03 (→ 10th place)

Women's 100 m Butterfly

- Svetlana Koptchikova
  1. Heat – 1:01.65
  2. B-Final – 1:01.48 (→ 9th place)

Women's 200 m Butterfly

- Svetlana Koptchikova
  1. Heat – 2:15.26
  2. B-Final – 2:14.43 (→ 12th place)

Women's 200 m Individual Medley

- Yelena Dendeberova
  1. Heat – 2:15.30
  2. Final – 2:13.31 (→ Silver medal)
- Yulia Bogatcheva
  1. Heat – 2:19.07
  2. B-Final – 2:19.91 (→ 15th place)

Women's 400 m Individual Medley

- Yelena Dendeberova
  1. Heat – 4:46.63
  2. Final – 4:40.44 (→ 4th place)

Women's 4 × 100 m Freestyle Relay

- Inna Abramova, Svetlana Issakova, Yelena Dendeberova and Svetlana Koptchikova
  1. Heat – 3:46.28
- Yelena Dendeberova, Svetlana Issakova, Natalia Trefilova and Svetlana Koptchikova
  1. Final – 3:44.99 (→ 5th place)

== Synchronized swimming ==
Three synchronized swimmers represented the Soviet Union in 1988.

Women's solo

- Christina Thalassinidou
- Mariya Chernyayeva
- Tatyana Titova

Women's duet

- Mariya Chernyayeva
- Tatyana Titova

== Tennis ==
Men's Singles Competition

- Alexander Volkov
  1. First round — Lost to Carl-Uwe Steeb (West Germany) 5–7 4–6 3–6

Women's Singles Competition

- Larisa Neiland
  1. First Round – Bye
  2. Second Round – Defeated Sara Gomer (Great Britain) 6–7 7–6 9–7
  3. Third Round – Defeated Il-Soon Kim (South Korea) 6–3 7–6
  4. Quarterfinals – Lost to Steffi Graf (West Germany) 2–6 6–4 3–6
- Leila Meskhi
  1. First Round – Defeated Regina Rajchrtová (Czechoslovakia) 7–5 7–5
  2. Second Round – Lost to Steffi Graf (West Germany) 5–7 1–6
- Natasha Zvereva
  1. First Round – Bye
  2. Second Round – Defeated Anne Minter (Australia) 6–4 3–6 6–1
  3. Third Round – Defeated Tine Scheuer-Larsen (Denmark) 6–1 6–2
  4. Quarterfinals – Lost to Gabriela Sabatini (Argentina) 4–6 3–6

== Volleyball ==
=== Men's tournament ===
- Preliminary round (group A)

- Defeated Bulgaria (3–0)
- Defeated Sweden (3–0)
- Defeated South Korea (3–0)
- Defeated Italy (3–1)
- Lost to Brazil (2–3)

- Semi Finals

- Defeated Argentina (3–0)

- Final

- Lost to the United States (1–3) → Silver medal

- Team roster

- Yuri Panchenko
- Andrei Kuznetsov
- Vyatcheslav Zaytsev (c)
- Igor Runov
- Vladimir Chkourikhine
- Yevgueny Krasilnikov
- Raimond Vilde
- Valery Lossev
- Yuri Sapega
- Oleksandr Sorokalet
- Yaroslav Antonov
- Yuri Tcherednik

- Head coach: Gennady Parchin

=== Women's tournament ===
- Preliminary round (group A)

- Lost to Japan (2–3)
- Defeated South Korea (3–2)
- Defeated East Germany (3–0)

- Semi Finals

- Defeated PR China (3–0)

- Final

- Defeated Peru (3–2) → Gold medal

- Team roster

- Valentina Ogienko (c)
- Yelena Volkova
- Irina Smirnova-Ilchenko
- Tatyana Sidorenko
- Irina Parkhomchuk-Kirillova
- Olga Shkurnova
- Marina Nikulina
- Yelena Ovchinnikova
- Olga Krivosheyeva
- Svetlana Korytova
- Marina Kumysh
- Tatyana Krainova

- Head coach: Nikolai Karpol

== Water polo ==
=== Men's tournament ===
- Preliminary round (group A)

- Drew with Italy (9–9)
- Defeated Australia (11–4)
- Defeated France (14–8)
- Defeated South Korea (17–4)
- Lost to West Germany (8–9)

- Semi Finals

- Lost to United States (7–8)

- Bronze medal match

- Defeated West Germany (14–13) → Bronze medal

- Team roster

- Evgueni Charonov
- Nurlan Mendygaliyev
- Yevgeny Grishin
- Aleksandr Kolotov
- Sergey Naumov
- Viktor Berendiuha
- Sergey Kotenko
- Dmitri Apanasenko
- Georgui Mchvenieradze
- Mikhail Ivanov
- Serguei Markotch
- Nikolai Smirnov
- Mikhail Giorgadze

- Head coach: Boris Popov

== Wrestling ==
=== Men's freestyle ===
=== Athlete ===	Event	First round	Second round	Third round	Fourth round	Fifth round	Sixth round	Seventh round	Final round	Rank
=== Athlete ===	Event		Opposition Result	Opposition Result	Opposition Result	Opposition Result	Opposition Result	Opposition Result	Opposition Result	Rank

- Alexander Karelin — Wrestling, Heavyweight

== Medals by republic ==
In the following table for team events number of team representatives, who received medals are counted, not "one medal for all the team", as usual. Because there were people from different republics in one team.

Rank	Republic	Gold	Silver	Bronze	Total
1	Russian SFSR	61	31	49	141
2	Ukrainian SSR	19	13	24	56
3	Byelorussian SSR	14	3	8	25
4	Lithuanian SSR	11	3	3	17
5	Kazakh SSR	8	3	8	19
6	Georgian SSR	5	1	5	11
7	Latvian SSR	5	1	0	6
8	Moldavian SSR	2	3	2	7
9	Armenian SSR	2	2	0	4
10	Estonian SSR	2	1	2	5
11	Azerbaijan SSR	2	1	1	4
12	Uzbek SSR	1	2	1	4
13	Kirghiz SSR	1	2	0	3
14	Tajik SSR	1	0	0	1
Totals (14 entries)		134	66	103	303

== See also ==
- Soviet Union at the 1988 Summer Paralympics
