= 2017 Hungarian Swimming Championships =

The 2017 Hungarian Swimming Championships were the 119th edition of the Hungarian Swimming National Championships (Hungarian: CXIX. Országos Bajnokság Széchy Tamás emlékére), which took place on 19–22 April 2017 at the Debrecen Swimming Pool Complex in Debrecen.

== Events ==
Similar to the program's format, swimming features a total of 42 events (20 each for men and women), including two 2 mixed events. The following events will be contested (all pool events are long course, and distances are in metres unless stated):

- Freestyle: 50, 100, 200, 400, 800 (women), and 1,500 (men);
- Backstroke: 50, 100 and 200;
- Breaststroke: 50, 100 and 200;
- Butterfly: 50, 100 and 200;
- Individual medley: 200 and 400;
- Relays: 4×100 free, 4×200 free; 4×100 medley
- Mixed: 4×100 free; 4×100 medley

== Results ==
=== Men's events ===
Event	Gold		Silver		Bronze	
50 m freestyle	Krisztián Takács; Győri Úszó SE	22.39	Maxim Lobanovszkij; Győri Úszó SE	22.41	Nándor Németh; Egri ÚK	22.75
100 m freestyle	Nándor Németh; Egri ÚK	48.64	Péter Holoda; Hajdúszoboszlói Árpád SE	48.87	Dominik Kozma; MTK	49.56
200 m freestyle	Péter Bernek; BVSC-Zugló	1:48.54	Kristóf Milák; Érd	1:48.82	Nándor Németh; Egri ÚK	1:49.25
400 m freestyle	Péter Bernek; BVSC-Zugló	3:49.60	Richárd Márton; Budafóka XXII. SE	3:50.22	Dávid Verrasztó; BVSC-Zugló	3:50.59
800 m freestyle	Gergely Gyurta; UTE	7:55.85	Dávid Lakatos; Egri ÚK	7:57.57	Kristóf Rasovszky; Balaton UK Veszprém	7:59.76
1500 m freestyle	Gergely Gyurta; UTE	15:05.02	Ákos Kalmár; Bajai Spartacus SC	15:16.60	Dávid Lakatos; Egri ÚK	15:20.68
50 m backstroke	Richárd Bohus; Békéscsabai Előre ÚK	25.16	Gábor Balog; Győri Úszó SE	25.56	Bence Szentes; Győri Úszó SE	25.62
100 m backstroke	Richárd Bohus; Békéscsabai Előre ÚK	54.40	Gábor Balog; Győri Úszó SE	54.90	Ádám Telegdy; Kőbánya SC	55.08
200 m backstroke	Péter Bernek; BVSC-Zugló	1:56.69	Ádám Telegdy; Kőbánya SC	1:57.17	Gábor Balog; Győri Úszó SE	1:58.68
50 m breaststroke	Dániel Gyurta; UTE	28.11	Danila Dolenko; Russia	28.51	Zoltán Horváth; Római SE Ádám Rozanovic; HÓD Úszó SE	28.81
100 m breaststroke	Dániel Gyurta; UTE	1:00.35	Gábor Financsek; Mohácsi TE	1:01.44	Danila Dolenko; Russia	1:01.56
200 m breaststroke	Dániel Gyurta; UTE	2:09.72	Dávid Horváth; Kőbánya SC	2:12.06	Máté Kutasi; Vasas SC	2:13.75
50 m butterfly	László Cseh; Egri ÚK	23.94	Krisztián Takács; Győri Úszó SE	24.13	Bence Pulai; Kőbánya SC	24.21
100 m butterfly	Kristóf Milák; Érd	51.98	László Cseh; Egri ÚK	52.36	Bence Pulai; Kőbánya SC	52.74
200 m butterfly	Tamás Kenderesi; Pécsi Sport	1:54.89	Kristóf Milák; Érd	1:55.41	Márk Tekauer; Dunaharaszti MTK	1:56.44
200 m individual medley	László Cseh; Egri ÚK	1:59.43	Ádám Telegdy; Kőbánya SC	2:00.01	Dániel Sós; Vasas SC	2:00.64
400 m individual medley	Gergely Gyurta; UTE	4:12.81	Péter Bernek; BVSC-Zugló	4:13.62	Balázs Holló; Egri ÚK	4:18.48
4 × 100 m freestyle relay	Egri ÚK; Nándor Németh (49.34); Balázs Holló (51.55); Dávid Lakatos (50.78); László Cseh (50.18)	3:21.85	Győri Úszó SE; Márk Mészáros (50.62); Krisztián Takács (49.94); Gábor Balog (51.53); Bence Gyárfásj (50.40)	3:22.49	Kőbánya SC; Ádám Telegdy (51.58); Ármin Reményi (52.34); Bence Pulai (51.90); Vince Pulai (50.78)	3:26.60
4 × 200 m freestyle relay	Egri ÚK; Dávid Lakatos (1:51.43); Nándor Németh (1:50.40); Balázs Holló (1:53.53); László Cseh (1:54.75)	7:30.11	BVSC-Zugló; Bence Biczó (1:52.14); Zoltán Drigán (1:52.84); Krisztián Kátai (1:55.27); Márk Papp (1:52.83)	7:33.08	Kőbánya SC; Ádám Telegdy (1:54.33); Ármin Reményi (1:52.71); Vince Pulai (1:54.19); Bence Pulai (1:55.97)	7:37.20
4 × 100 m medley relay	Kőbánya SC; Ádám Telegdy (55.98); Dávid Horváth (1:02.16); Bence Pulai (52.27); Vince Pulai (50.34)	3:40.75	Egri ÚK; Nándor Németh (56.33); Tamás Takács (1:04.08); László Cseh (51.71); Balázs Holló (51.45)	3:43.57	BVSC-Zugló; Péter Bernek (55.48); Dávid Verrasztó (1:02.36); Bence Biczó (54.08); Zoltán Drigán (52.35)	3:44.27

=== Women's events ===
Event	Gold		Silver		Bronze	
50 m freestyle	Flóra Molnár; Délzalai Vízmű SE	25.41	Evelyn Verrasztó; BVSC-Zugló	25.88	Alexandra Touretski; Győri Úszó SE	25.89
100 m freestyle	Katinka Hosszú; Iron Aquatics	54.62	Evelyn Verrasztó; BVSC-Zugló	54.77	Flóra Molnár; Délzalai Vízmű SE	55.52
200 m freestyle	Katinka Hosszú; Iron Aquatics	1:57.29	Ajna Késely; Kőbánya SC	1:57.86	Evelyn Verrasztó; BVSC-Zugló	1:58.44
400 m freestyle	Ajna Késely; Kőbánya SC	4:06.64	Katinka Hosszú; Iron Aquatics	4:07.52	Boglárka Kapás; UTE	4:07.65
800 m freestyle	Boglárka Kapás; UTE	8:24.76	Ajna Késely; Kőbánya SC	8:31.05	Adél Juhász; Kiskunhalasi UGYE	8:44.09
1500 m freestyle	Boglárka Kapás; UTE	16:04.19	Ajna Késely; Kőbánya SC	16:14.35	Katinka Hosszú; Iron Aquatics	16:18.72
50 m backstroke	Katinka Hosszú; Iron Aquatics	28.54	Sára Joó; Érd	28.95	Katalin Burián; Egri ÚK	28.97
100 m backstroke	Katinka Hosszú; Iron Aquatics	1:00.46	Katalin Burián; Egri ÚK	1:01.65	Réka György; Vasas SC	1:01.67
200 m backstroke	Katalin Burián; Egri ÚK	2:09.85	Réka György; Vasas SC	2:11.36	Katinka Hosszú; Iron Aquatics	2:13.47
50 m breaststroke	Flóra Molnár; Délzalai Vízmű SE	32.12	Ivett Szurovcsák; Nyíregyházi SC	32.24	Katinka Hosszú; Iron Aquatics	32.28
100 m breaststroke	Réka Vécsei; Miskolc VSI	1:09.90	Ivett Szurovcsák; Nyíregyházi SC	1:09.97	Anna Sztankovics; UTE	1:10.53
200 m breaststroke	Réka Vécsei; Miskolc VSI	2:28.61	Katinka Hosszú; Iron Aquatics	2:29.47	Dalma Sebestyén; Győri Úszó SE	2:30.69
50 m butterfly	Flóra Molnár; Délzalai Vízmű SE	26.71	Alexandra Touretski; Győri Úszó SE	26.80	Sára Joó; Érd	27.12
100 m butterfly	Liliána Szilágyi; BHSE	59.04	Katinka Hosszú; Iron Aquatics	59.15	Zsuzsanna Jakabos; Győri Úszó SE	59.59
200 m butterfly	Zsuzsanna Jakabos; Győri Úszó SE	2:08.06	Liliána Szilágyi; BHSE	2:09.12	Boglárka Kapás; UTE	2:10.74
200 m individual medley	Katinka Hosszú; Iron Aquatics	2:09.38	Zsuzsanna Jakabos; Győri Úszó SE	2:12.36	Evelyn Verrasztó; BVSC-Zugló	2:12.62
400 m individual medley	Katinka Hosszú; Iron Aquatics	4:35.91	Boglárka Kapás; UTE	4:39.35	Zsuzsanna Jakabos; Győri Úszó SE	4:39.39
4 × 100 m freestyle relay	Győri Úszó SE; Sára Gyertyánffy (57.85); Dorottya Dobos (58.05); Réka Kovács (58.24); Zsuzsanna Jakabos (54.82)	3:48.96	BVSC-Zugló; Evelyn Verrasztó (55.60); Réka Nagy (57.50); Ádám Henrietta (59.72); Bettina Böszörményi (57.11)	3:49.93	MTK; Fanni Gyurinovics (55.95); Petra Kiss (58.23); Blanka Melinda Bokros (59.72); Mónika Ollé (58.15)	3:52.05
4 × 200 m freestyle relay	Kőbánya SC; Ajna Késely (1:58.87); Anett Borsi (2:05.76); Réka Rohácsi (2:08.38); Kata Sömenek Onon (2:06.92)	8:19.93	Egri ÚK; Zsófia Muzsnay (2:06.85); Nikoletta Kiss (2:06.43); Klaudia Sós (2:04.15); Bóra Beliczai (2:05.56)	8:22.99	BVSC-Zugló; Evelyn Verrasztó (2:03.80); Bettina Böszörményi (2:08.52); Adél Farkas (2:07.34); Réka Nagy (2:04.06)	8:23.72
4 × 100 m medley relay	Győri Úszó SE; Dorottya Dobos (1:02.68); Zsuzsanna Jakabos (1:08.96); Sára Gyertyánffy (1:02.29); Réka Kovács (58.05)	4:11.98	MTK; Mónika Ollé (1:04.17); Bettina Kotnyek (1:13.52); Blanka Melinda Bokros (1:01.77); Fanni Gyurinovics (55.10)	4:14.56	Vasas SC; Eszter Szabó-Feltóthy (1:04.45); Eszter Labán (1:13.02); Szimonetta Galamb (1:00.58); Réka György (56.60)	4:14.65

=== Mixed events ===
Event	Gold		Silver		Bronze	
4 × 100 m freestyle relay	Érd; Kristóf Milák (50.70); Kristóf Jánosi (50.77); Petra Barócsai (56.45); Sára Joó (55.42)	3:33.34	BVSC-Zugló; Péter Bernek (50.92); Dávid Verrasztó (52.14); Evelyn Verrasztó (54.60); Bettina Böszörményi (57.19)	3:34.85	Győri Úszó SE; Márk Mészáros (50.78); Krisztián Takács (51.29); Sára Gyertyánffy (57.86); Zsuzsanna Jakabos (55.60)	3:35.53
4 × 100 m medley relay	Győri Úszó SE; Gábor Balogh (54.97); Denisz Dér (1:05.46); Zsuzsanna Jakabos (59.32); Sára Gyertyánffy (57.26)	3:57.01	Egri ÚK; Katalin Burián (1:01.97); Tamás Takács (1:03.83); Zsófia Muzsnay (1:03.25); Nándor Németh (48.57)	3:57.56	Vasas SC; Dániel Sós (57.58); Máté Kutasi (1:05.38); Szimonetta Galamb (1:00.40); Réka György (56.75)	4:00.11

== See also ==
- Hungarian Swimming National Championships
- Hungarian Swimming Association
