= 2016 Hungarian Swimming Championships =

The 2016 Hungarian Athletics Championships were the 118th edition of the Hungarian Swimming Championships (Hungarian: CXVIII. Országos Bajnokság Széchy Tamás emlékére), which took place on 12–16 April 2016 at the Aqua Sportközpont in Győr.

== Events ==
Similar to the program's format, swimming features a total of 42 events (20 each for men and women), including two 2 mixed events. The following events will be contested (all pool events are long course, and distances are in metres unless stated):

- Freestyle: 50, 100, 200, 400, 800 (women), and 1,500 (men);
- Backstroke: 50, 100 and 200;
- Breaststroke: 50, 100 and 200;
- Butterfly: 50, 100 and 200;
- Individual medley: 200 and 400;
- Relays: 4×100 free, 4×200 free; 4×100 medley
- Mixed: 4×100 free; 4×100 medley

== Results ==
=== Men's events ===
| Event | Gold | | Silver | | Bronze | |
|---|---|---|---|---|---|---|
| 50 m freestyle | Péter Holoda; Hajdúszoboszló Árpád SE | 22.38 | Krisztián Takács; Győri Úszó SE | 22.43 | Ádám Rozanovic; HÓD Úszó SE | 22.63 |
| 100 m freestyle | Péter Holoda; Hajdúszoboszló Árpád SE | 49.22 | Richárd Bohus; Békéscsabai Előre | 49.58 | Dominik Kozma; MTK | 49.73 |
| 200 m freestyle | Péter Bernek; BVSC Zugló | 1:47.43 | Dominik Kozma; MTK | 1:47.81 | Richárd Márton; Budafóka XXII. SE | 1:49.96 |
| 400 m freestyle | Péter Bernek; BVSC Zugló | 3:47.32 | Gergely Gyurta; UTE | 3:51.34 | Márk Papp; BVSC Zugló | 3:52.14 |
| 800 m freestyle | Gergely Gyurta; UTE | 7:51.77 | Péter Bernek; BVSC Zugló | 8:01.96 | Márk Papp; BVSC Zugló | 8:03.03 |
| 1500 m freestyle | Gergely Gyurta; UTE | 14:54.55 | Kristóf Rasovszky; Balaton UK Veszprém | 15:12.86 | Péter Bernek; BVSC Zugló | 15:18.86 |
| 50 m backstroke | Gábor Balog; Győri Úszó SE | 25.39 | László Cseh; Egri ÚK | 25.81 | Bence Szucsik; Darnyi Tamás SC | 26.10 |
| 100 m backstroke | Gábor Balog; Győri Úszó SE | 54.97 | Ádám Telegdy; Kőbánya SC | 55.63 | Benedek Kovács; Érd | 55.72 |
| 200 m backstroke | Gábor Balog; Győri Úszó SE | 1:58.02 | Dávid Földházi; Bácsvíz KVSC KESI | 1:58.09 | Balázs Zsámbó; Darnyi Tamás SC | 1:58.14 |
| 50 m breaststroke | Gábor Financsek; Mohácsi TE | 28.33 | Dániel Gyurta; UTE | 28.47 | Tamás Szabó; HÓD Úszó SE | 28.48 |
| 100 m breaststroke | Dániel Gyurta; UTE | 1:01.18 | Richárd Miksi; HÓD Úszó SE | 1:02.64 | Gábor Financsek; Mohácsi TE | 1:02.82 |
| 200 m breaststroke | Dániel Gyurta; UTE | 2:10.84 | Dávid Horváth; Kőbánya SC | 2:13.68 | Máté Kutasi; TFSE | 2:15.77 |
| 50 m butterfly | László Cseh; Egri ÚK | 23.83 | Ádám Telegdy; Kőbánya SC | 24.27 | Bence Pulai; Kőbánya SC | 24.31 |
| 100 m butterfly | László Cseh; Egri ÚK | 51.68 | Tamás Kenderesi; Pécsi Sport | 53.29 | Hoàng Quý Phước; Vietnam | 53.35 |
| 200 m butterfly | László Cseh; Egri ÚK | 1:54.85 | Tamás Kenderesi; Pécsi Sport | 1:56.17 | Bence Biczó; Debrecen SSI | 1:57.76 |
| 200 m individual medley | László Cseh; Egri ÚK | 2:00.20 | Dániel Sós; Érd | 2:01.15 | Péter Bernek; BVSC Zugló | 2:01.77 |
| 400 m individual medley | Gergely Gyurta; UTE | 4:17.79 | Benjámin Grátz; Százhalombattai VUK SE | 4:15.16 | Ioannis Drymonakos (Greece) AO Okeanos | 4:20.92 |
| 4 × 100 m freestyle relay | Győri Úszó SE; Krisztián Takács (50.14); Bence Gyárfás (50.70); Gábor Balog (50.79); Maxim Lobanovszkij (50.71) | 3:22.34 | Kőbánya SC; Vince Pulai (51.29); Ármin Reményi (50.94); Dávid Horváth (52.37); Ádám Telegdy (49.28) | 3:23.88 | Egri ÚK; Gergely Kutasi (52.49); Nándor Németh (51.31); Balázs Holló (52.06); László Cseh (50.14) | 3:26.00 |
| 4 × 200 m freestyle relay | BVSC Zugló; Zoltán Drigán (1:53.46); Márk Papp ( ) Valter Boldizsár ( ) Péter Bernek ( ) | 7:26.73 | Egri ÚK; Balázs Holló (1:52.30); Nándor Németh ( ) Péter Nagy ( ) László Cseh ( ) | 7:28.95 | Kőbánya SC; Ádám Telegdy (1:51.43); Ármin Reményi ( ) Vince Pulai ( ) Balázs Berecz ( ) | 7:30.31 |
| 4 × 100 m medley relay | Kőbánya SC; Ádám Telegdy (56.15); Dávid Horváth (1:01.03); Bence Pulai (52.37); Ármin Reményi (50.97) | 3:41.52 | Egri ÚK; Ármin Reményi (58.41); Tamás Takács (1:04.07); László Cseh (52.46); Balázs Holló (51.64) | 3:46.58 | Győri Úszó SE; Gábor Balog (55.17); Denisz Dér (1:07.61); Krisztián Takács (53.56); Bence Gyárfás (50.59) | 3:46.93 |

=== Women's events ===
| Event | Gold | | Silver | | Bronze | |
|---|---|---|---|---|---|---|
| 50 m freestyle | Sára Joó; FTC | 26.26 | Fanni Gyurinovics; Győri Úszó SE | 26.52 | Zsuzsanna Kurucz; Budafóka XXII. SE | 26.56 |
| 100 m freestyle | Evelyn Verrasztó; A Jövő SC | 55.39 | Bettina Böszörményi; BVSC Zugló | 56.39 | Ajna Késely; Kőbánya SC | 56.39 |
| 200 m freestyle | Boglárka Kapás; UTE | 1:58.45 | Bettina Böszörményi; BVSC Zugló | 2:00.36 | Ajna Késely; Kőbánya SC | 2:00.70 |
| 400 m freestyle | Boglárka Kapás; UTE | 4:07.99 | Melinda Novoszáth; Szegedi UE | 4:11.80 | Ajna Késely; Kőbánya SC | 4:12.11 |
| 800 m freestyle | Boglárka Kapás; UTE | 8:27.14 | Éva Risztov; Kőbánya SC | 8:33.30 | Adél Juhász; Kiskunhalasi UGYE | 8:33.50 |
| 1500 m freestyle | Boglárka Kapás; UTE | 16:23.21 | Nikolett Szilágyi; Dunaharaszti MTK | 16:58.50 | Adél Farkas; BVSC Zugló | 17:02.45 |
| 50 m backstroke | Sára Joó; FTC | 29.39 | Katalin Burián; Bácsvíz KVSC KESI | 29.58 | Réka György; TFSE | 29.70 |
| 100 m backstroke | Réka György; TFSE | 1:01.86 | Katalin Burián; Bácsvíz KVSC KESI | 1:02.20 | Szimonetta Galamb; TFSE | 1:03.51 |
| 200 m backstroke | Réka György; TFSE | 2:10.69 | Katalin Burián; Bácsvíz KVSC KESI | 2:11.57 | Laura Vanda Ilyés; Bácsvíz KVSC KESI | 2:15.25 |
| 50 m breaststroke | Anna Sztankovics; UTE | 32.11 | Dalma Sebestyén; Hullám 91 ÚE Ivett Szurovcsák; Nyíregyházi SC | 32.54 | | |
| 100 m breaststroke | Anna Sztankovics; UTE | 1:08.96 | Dalma Sebestyén; Hullám 91 ÚE | 1:09.58 | Petra Halmai; Hullám 91 ÚE | 1:10.64 |
| 200 m breaststroke | Dalma Sebestyén; Hullám 91 ÚE | 2:27.47 | Anna Sztankovics; UTE | 2:29.00 | Hanna Dzerkal; Ukraine | 2:31.03 |
| 50 m butterfly | Liliána Szilágyi; BHSE | 27.14 | Evelyn Verrasztó; A Jövő SC | 27.23 | Szonja Szokol; Bácsvíz KVSC KESI | 27.31 |
| 100 m butterfly | Evelyn Verrasztó; A Jövő SC | 59.80 | Szonja Szokol; Bácsvíz KVSC KESI | 1:00.38 | Szimonetta Galamb; TFSE | 1:00.56 |
| 200 m butterfly | Zsuzsanna Jakabos; Győri Úszó SE | 2:08.55 | Liliána Szilágyi; BHSE | 2:08.83 | Boglárka Kapás; UTE | 2:09.18 |
| 200 m individual medley | Zsuzsanna Jakabos; Győri Úszó SE | 2:13.14 | Hanna Dzerkal; Ukraine | 2:17.95 | Gréta Szilvási; Kiskunhalasi UGYE | 2:19.19 |
| 400 m individual medley | Zsuzsanna Jakabos; Győri Úszó SE | 4:39.03 | Réka György; TFSE | 4:39.36 | Boglárka Kapás; UTE | 4:40.25 |
| 4 × 100 m freestyle relay | Győri Úszó SE; Zsuzsanna Jakabos (54.49); Fanni Gyurinovics (56.47); Dorottya Dobos (57.93); Share Lee Janovitz (1:00.04) | 3:48.93 | FTC; Helga Fodor (58.27); Dóra Kiss (58.26); Petra Kis (58.33); Sára Joó (57.28) | 3:52.14 | BVSC Zugló; Bettina Böszörményi (56.67); Viktória Kardos (59.45); Flóra Fodor (59.19); Réka Nagy (59.02) | 3:54.33 |
| 4 × 200 m freestyle relay | Kiskunhalasi UGYE; Janka Juhász (2:02.05); Luca Vas ( ) Gréta Szilvási ( ) Adél Juhász ( ) | 8:12.41 | Kőbánya SC; Ajna Késely (1:59.97); Anett Borsi ( ) Kata Sömenek Onon ( ) Éva Risztov ( ) | 8:15.31 | Szegedi UE; Melinda Novoszáth (2:00.97); Fanni Fábián ( ) Boglárka Bonecz ( ) Anna Olasz ( ) | 8:20.99 |
| 4 × 100 m medley relay | TFSE; Eszter Szabó Feltóthy (1:06.39); Eszter Labán (1:11.84); Szimonetta Galamb (1:00.19); Réka György (55.96) | 4:14.38 | Győri Úszó SE; Dorottya Dobos (1:03.84); Fanni Gyurinovics (1:12.75); Zsuzsanna Jakabos (59.13); Share Lee Janovitz (59.16) | 4:14.98 | Bácsvíz KVSC KESI; Katalin Burián (1:02.78); Petra Ölvödi (1:13.10); Szonja Szokol (1:00.04); Luca Bogdán (59.34) | 4:15.26 |

=== Mixed events ===
| Event | Gold | | Silver | | Bronze | |
|---|---|---|---|---|---|---|
| 4 × 100 m freestyle relay | Győri Úszó SE; Bence Gyárfás (51.43); Krisztián Takács (50.30); Zsuzsanna Jakabos (55.51); Fanni Gyurinovics (56.21) | 3:33.45 | Kőbánya SC; Ádám Telegdy (50.06); Ajna Késely (57.39); Anett Borsi (58.49); Ármin Reményi (51.09) | 3:37.03 | Darnyi Tamás SC; Bence Szucsik (51.92); Adrienn Márka (57.41); Nikolett Federics (59.49); Balázs Zsámbó (51.15) | 3:39.97 |
| 4 × 100 m medley relay | Bácsvíz KVSC KESI; Katalin Burián (1:01.93); Péter Tejes (1:03.13); Szonja Szokol (1:00.04); Dávid Földházi (50.25) | 3:55.35 | BVSC Zugló; Péter Bernek (56.60); Áron Angeli (1:04.19); Flóra Fodor (1:01.65); Bettina Böszörményi (56.12) | 3:58.56 | Egri ÚK; Bóra Beliczai (1:05.63); Tamás Takács (1:03.81); László Cseh (51.29); Zsófia Muzsnay (58.13) | 3:58.86 |

== See also ==
- Hungarian Swimming Championships
- Hungarian Swimming Association
