= 2018 Hungarian Swimming Championships =

- Host city: Debrecen, Hungary
- Date: 28–31 March 2018
- Venue: Debrecen Swimming Pool Complex
- Athletes: 385
- Events: 40

The 2018 Hungarian Swimming Championships were the 120th edition of the Hungarian Swimming National Championships (Hungarian: CXX. Országos Bajnokság Széchy Tamás emlékére), which took place on 28–31 March 2018 at the Debrecen Swimming Pool Complex in Debrecen.

== Events ==
Similar to the program's format, swimming features a total of 42 events (20 each for men and women), including two 2 mixed events. The following events will be contested (all pool events are long course, and distances are in metres unless stated):

- Freestyle: 50, 100, 200, 400, 800 (women), and 1,500 (men);
- Backstroke: 50, 100 and 200;
- Breaststroke: 50, 100 and 200;
- Butterfly: 50, 100 and 200;
- Individual medley: 200 and 400;
- Relays: 4×100 free, 4×200 free; 4×100 medley
- Mixed: 4×100 free; 4×100 medley

=== Schedule ===
Legend
Key	H	½	F	TF
Value	Heats	Semifinals	Final	Timed final

Men's Schedule
Date	Mar 28		Mar 29		Mar 30		Mar 31	
50m freestyle	H	F						
100m freestyle					H	F		
200m freestyle							H	F
400m freestyle			H	F				
800m freestyle							H	F
1500m freestyle	H	F						
50m backstroke							H	F
100m backstroke	H	F						
200m backstroke					H	F		
50m breaststroke							H	F
100m breaststroke	H	F						
200m breaststroke					H	F		
50m butterfly			H	F				
100m butterfly							H	F
200m butterfly	H	F						
200m individual medley			H	F				
400m individual medley					H	F		
4 × 100 m freestyle relay					H	F		
4 × 200 m freestyle relay			H	F				
4 × 100 m medley relay							H	F

Women's Schedule
Date	Mar 28		Mar 29		Mar 30		Mar 31	
50m freestyle	H	F						
100m freestyle					H	F		
200m freestyle							H	F
400m freestyle			H	F				
800m freestyle	H	F						
1500m freestyle							H	F
50m backstroke							H	F
100m backstroke	H	F						
200m backstroke					H	F		
50m breaststroke							H	F
100m breaststroke	H	F						
200m breaststroke					H	F		
50m butterfly			H	F				
100m butterfly							H	F
200m butterfly	H	F						
200m individual medley			H	F				
400 m individual medley					H	F		
4 × 100 m freestyle relay					H	F		
4 × 200 m freestyle relay			H	F				
4 × 100 m medley relay							H	F

Mixed Schedule
Date	Mar 28		Mar 29	Mar 30		Mar 31
4 × 100 m freestyle relay	H	F				
4 × 100 m medley relay				H	F	

== Medal table ==
Rank	Team	Gold	Silver	Bronze	Total
1	BVSC-Zugló	10	6	3	19
2	Egri ÚK	7	6	7	22
3	Győri Úszó SE	6	7	3	16
4	Kőbánya SC	4	4	4	12
5	Érd	3	5	4	12
6	UTE	3	2	2	7
7	Miskolc VSI	2	0	1	3
8	Hódmezővásárhelyi SUVC	2	0	0	2
9	Szegedi ÚE	1	1	2	4
10	Ferencváros	1	1	1	3
11	Bajai Spartacus	1	1	0	2
11	Délzalai Vízmű	1	1	0	2
13	Debreceni Sportcentrum	1	0	1	2
14	Balaton ÚK Veszprém	1	0	0	1
15	Vasas SC	0	2	4	6
16	Pécsi SN	0	1	1	2
17	Mohácsi TE	0	1	0	1
17	DMTK-KVSE	0	1	0	1
17	Bp. Honvéd	0	1	0	1
20	Budafóka XXII. SE	0	0	2	2
20	Kiskunhalasi UGYE	0	0	2	2
20	Nyíregyházi SC	0	0	2	2
23	Darnyi Tamás SC	0	0	1	1
23	Százhalombattai VUK	0	0	1	1
Total		43	41	42	126

== Results ==
=== Men's events ===
Event	Gold		Silver		Bronze	
50 m freestyle	Maxim Lobanovszkij; Győri Úszó SE	22.32	Krisztián Takács; Győri Úszó SE	22.42	Nándor Németh; Egri ÚK	22.55
100 m freestyle	Nándor Németh; Egri ÚK	48.31	Dominik Kozma; BVSC-Zugló	49.05	Kristóf Milák; Érd	49.49
200 m freestyle	Dominik Kozma; BVSC-Zugló	1:47.16	Kristóf Milák; Érd	1:47.97	Nándor Németh; Egri ÚK	1:48.42
400 m freestyle	Péter Bernek; BVSC-Zugló	3:48.49	Kristóf Milák; Érd	3:48.71	Richárd Márton; Budafóka XXII. SE	3:50.62
800 m freestyle	Kristóf Rasovszky; Balaton UK Veszprém	7:56.85	Ákos Kalmár; Bajai Spartacus	7:58.40	Gergely Gyurta; UTE	8:00.90
1500 m freestyle	Ákos Kalmár; Bajai Spartacus	15:03.14	Gergely Gyurta; UTE	15:08.74	Dávid Huszti; Darnyi Tamás SC	15:16.19
50 m backstroke	Kristóf Milák; Érd	25.23	Bence Szentes; Győri Úszó SE	25.25	Benedek Kovács; Érd	25.68
100 m backstroke	Péter Bernek; BVSC-Zugló	54.83	Benedek Kovács; Érd	54.99	Gábor Zombori; Budafóka XXII. SE	55.44
200 m backstroke	Péter Bernek; BVSC-Zugló	1:57.33	Ádám Telegdy; Kőbánya SC	1:58.70	Benedek Kovács; Érd	1:58.78
50 m breaststroke	Csaba Szilágyi; Hódmezővásárhelyi SUVC	27.05	Gábor Financsek; Mohácsi TE	28.29	Dávid Horváth; Kőbánya SC	28.38
100 m breaststroke	Csaba Szilágyi; Hódmezővásárhelyi SUVC	59.74	Tamás Takács; Egri ÚK	1:01.54	Dávid Horváth; Kőbánya SC	1:01.82
200 m breaststroke	Dávid Horváth; Kőbánya SC	2:11.35	Máté Kutasi; Vasas SC	2:13.43	Tamás Takács; Egri ÚK	2:14.17
50 m butterfly	Dominik Kozma; BVSC-Zugló László Cseh; Egri ÚK	23.84			Krisztián Takács; Győri Úszó SE	23.91
100 m butterfly	Kristóf Milák; Érd	51.50	László Cseh; Egri ÚK	52.46	Tamás Kenderesi; Pécsi SN	53.28
200 m butterfly	Kristóf Milák; Érd	1:52.71	Tamás Kenderesi; Pécsi SN	1:54.14	László Cseh; Egri ÚK	1:56.45
200 m individual medley	Péter Bernek; BVSC-Zugló	1:59.67	Dávid Verrasztó; Ferencváros	2:00.10	Benjámin Grátz; Egri ÚK	2:01.65
400 m individual medley	Dávid Verrasztó; Ferencváros	4:12.98	Péter Bernek; BVSC-Zugló	4:14.42	Gergely Gyurta; UTE	4:15.12
4 × 100 m freestyle relay	Győri Úszó SE; Bence Gyárfás (50.38); Maxim Lobanovszkij (49.10); Krisztián Takács (50.15); Márk Mészáros (49.74)	3:19.37	Egri ÚK; László Cseh (50.72); Balázs Holló (50.89); Dávid Lakatos (50.30); Nándor Németh (47.49)	3:19.40	BVSC-Zugló; Péter Bernek (50.92); Richárd Bohus (50.34); Dominik Kozma (48.27); Márk Papp (51.72)	3:21.25
4 × 200 m freestyle relay	Egri ÚK; Balázs Holló (1:50.59); László Cseh (1:50.03); Benjámin Grátz (1:50.43); Nándor Németh (1:47.34)	7:18.39	BVSC-Zugló; Dominik Kozma (1:47.63); Márk Papp (1:52.18); Zoltán Drigán (1:51.90); Péter Bernek (1:54.10)	7:25.81	Ferencváros; Bence Biczó (1:51.08); Benedek Mándli (1:54.20); Dávid Verrasztó (1:51.44); Norbert Szabó (1:54.88)	7:31.60
4 × 100 m medley relay	Egri ÚK; Benjámin Grátz (56.53); Tamás Takács (1:00.89); László Cseh (52.29); Nándor Németh (49.47)	3:39.18	Kőbánya SC; Ádám Telegdy (55.43); Dávid Horváth (1:01.60); Bence Pulai (52.88); Balázs Berecz (51.14)	3:41.05	Érd; Benedek Kovács (54.85); Dávid Szelei (1:04.88); Kristóf Milák (51.73); Kristóf Jánosi (50.38)	3:41.84

=== Women's events ===
Event	Gold		Silver		Bronze	
50 m freestyle	Petra Senánszky; Debreceni Sportcentrum	25.62	Flóra Molnár; Délzalai Vízmű	26.10	Evelyn Verrasztó; BVSC-Zugló	26.15
100 m freestyle	Evelyn Verrasztó; BVSC-Zugló	55.68	Zsófia Kurdi; DMTK-KVSE	56.46	Ajna Késely; Kőbánya SC	56.47
200 m freestyle	Ajna Késely; Kőbánya SC	1:59.62	Evelyn Verrasztó; BVSC-Zugló	2:00.42	Fanni Fábián; Szegedi ÚE	2:01.51
400 m freestyle	Ajna Késely; Kőbánya SC	4:05.61	Boglárka Kapás; UTE	4:05.92	Luca Vas; Szegedi ÚE	4:15.15
800 m freestyle	Boglárka Kapás; UTE	8:24.39	Ajna Késely; Kőbánya SC	8:25.82	Adél Juhász; Kiskunhalasi UGYE	8:46.53
1500 m freestyle	Ajna Késely; Kőbánya SC	16:33.97	Luca Vas; Szegedi ÚE	16:48.34	Adél Juhász; Kiskunhalasi UGYE	16:52.42
50 m backstroke	Katalin Burián; Egri ÚK	29.05	Dorottya Dobos; Győri Úszó SE	29.25	Laura Vanda Ilyés; Százhalombattai VUK	29.50
100 m backstroke	Katalin Burián; Egri ÚK	1:00.55	Dorottya Dobos; Győri Úszó SE	1:02.21	Réka György; Vasas SC	1:02.41
200 m backstroke	Katalin Burián; Egri ÚK	2:09.58	Eszter Szabó-Feltóthy; Vasas SC	2:12.41	Dorottya Dobos; Győri Úszó SE	2:12.77
50 m breaststroke	Anna Sztankovics; Miskolc VSI	31.65	Dalma Sebestyén; Győri Úszó SE	32.19	Ivett Szurovcsák; Nyíregyházi SC	32.30
100 m breaststroke	Anna Sztankovics; Miskolc VSI	1:08.83	Dalma Sebestyén; Győri Úszó SE	1:09.97	Eszter Békési; Egri ÚK	1:10.60
200 m breaststroke	Dalma Sebestyén; Győri Úszó SE	2:29.54	Eszter Békési; Egri ÚK	2:31.72	Réka Vécsei; Miskolc VSI	2:34.00
50 m butterfly	Flóra Molnár; Délzalai Vízmű	26.82	Beatrix Bordás; Hullám '91	26.92	Mónika Ollé; Győri Úszó SE	27.27
100 m butterfly	Evelyn Verrasztó; BVSC-Zugló	59.57	Sára Joó; Érd	1:00.38	Dóra Hatházi; Nyíregyházi SC	1:00.50
200 m butterfly	Boglárka Kapás; UTE	2:09.39	Liliána Szilágyi; Bp. Honvéd	2:10.20	Blanka Berecz; Kőbánya SC	2:10.81
200 m individual medley	Dalma Sebestyén; Győri Úszó SE	2:12.84	Evelyn Verrasztó; BVSC-Zugló	2:13.92	Réka György; Vasas SC	2:15.16
400 m individual medley	Boglárka Kapás; UTE	4:38.27	Ajna Késely; Kőbánya SC	4:44.43	Réka György; Vasas SC	4:45.25
4 × 100 m freestyle relay	Győri Úszó SE; Dalma Sebestyén (57.12); Mónika Ollé (58.00); Adrienn Márka (57.31); Dorottya Dobos (58.10)	3:50.53	BVSC-Zugló; Bettina Böszörményi (58.12); Réka Nagy (58.01); Ludovica Del Beato (59.47); Evelyn Verrasztó (55.35)	3:50.95	Debreceni Sportcentrum; Petra Senánszky (55.92); Adél Pál (59.65); Adrienn Pintye (58.54); Kincső Gál (58.52)	3:52.63
4 × 200 m freestyle relay	Szegedi ÚE; Fanni Fábián (2:02.83); Luca Vas (2:03.96); Boglárka Bonecz (2:03.56); Anna Olasz (2:06.49)	8:16.93	Egri ÚK; Zsófia Muzsnay (2:04.42); Katalin Burián (2:02.69); Klaudia Sós (2:04.58); Bóra Beliczai (2:05.34)	8:17.03	BVSC-Zugló; Réka Nagy (2:04.57); Bettina Böszörményi (2:05.83); Henrietta Ádám (2:08.52); Evelyn Verrasztó (2:01.22)	8:20.14
4 × 100 m medley relay	Győri Úszó SE; Dorottya Dobos (1:02.18); Dalma Sebestyén (1:09.87); Mónika Ollé (1:00.35); Adrienn Márka (57.24)	4:09.64	Egri ÚK; Katalin Burián (1:01.66); Eszter Békési (1:10.75); Zsófia Muzsnay (1:01.89); Bóra Beliczai (57.22)	4:11.52	Vasas SC; Eszter Szabó-Feltóthy (1:03.97); Lili Horváth (1:12.97); Szimonetta Galamb (1:00.49); Réka György (56.48)	4:13.91

=== Mixed events ===
Event	Gold		Silver		Bronze	
4 × 100 m freestyle relay	BVSC-Zugló; Dominik Kozma (49.27); Richárd Bohus (50.90); Réka Nagy (57.09); Evelyn Verrasztó (55.48)	3:32.74	Érd; Kristóf Milák (50.26); Kristóf Jánosi (50.63); Petra Barócsai (56.83); Sára Joó (56.99)	3:34.71	Egri ÚK; Balázs Holló (51.02); Nándor Németh (48.53); Zsófia Muzsnay (57.92); Bóra Beliczai (57.25)	3:34.72
4 × 100 m medley relay	BVSC-Zugló; Ádám Henrietta (1:04.59); Ákos Okos (1:03.78); Evelyn Verrasztó (1:00.08); Dominik Kozma (48.37)	3:56.82	Győri Úszó SE; Gábor Balogh (55.32); Denisz Dér (1:03.26); Mónika Ollé (1:00.41); Kiara Pózvai (58.03)	3:57.02	Egri ÚK; Máté Winkler (56.90); Sebestyén Bőhm (1:02.69); Zsófia Muzsnay (1:02.29); Bóra Beliczai (57.80)	3:59.86

== See also ==
- Hungarian Swimming Championships
- Hungarian Swimming Association
