= 1986 FIVB Men's Volleyball World Championship squads =

This article shows the rosters of the participating teams at the 1986 FIVB Men's Volleyball World Championship in France from 25 September – 5 October 1986.

== United States ==
Head coach: Marv Dunphy

Name	1986 club
Dusty Dvorak	
Jeff Stork	
Patrick Powers	
Steve Timmons	
Bob Ctvrtlik	
Dave Saunders	
Eric Sato	
Karch Kiraly	
Steve Salmons	
Craig Buck	
Doug Partie	

== Soviet Union ==
Head coach: Gennadiy Parshin

Name	1986 club
Vyacheslav Zaytsev	
Alexander Savin	
Yuriy Panchenko	
Pavel Selivanov	
Vladimir Shkurikhin	
Valery Losev	
Oleksandr Sorokalet	
Alexander Beleveich	
Yaroslav Antonov	
Raimond Vilde	
Yuriy Sapieha	
Igor Runov	

== Bulgaria ==
Head coach: Bogdan Kyuchukov

Name	1986 club
Petko Petkov	
Borislav Kyosev	
Plamen Hristov	
Petio Dragiev	
Dimo Tonev	
Assen Galabinov	
Tsvetan Florov	
Dimitar Bojilov	
Lyubomir Ganev	
Ivan Lazarov	
Nikolay Dimitrov	
Ilian Kaziyski	

== Brazil ==
Head coach: Bebeto de Freitas, José Carlos Brunoro

Name	1986 club
Bernardinho
William da Silva	
André Ferreira	
Xandó	
Zé Eduardo	
Renan Dal Zotto	
Jose Montanaro Junior	
Leonídio de Pra	
Rui Nascimento	
Bernard Rajzman	
Antônio Carlos Gouveia
Amauri Ribeiro	

== France ==
- Coach Éric Daniel

No.	Name	Date of birth	Height
1	Philippe Blain	20 May 1960 (aged 26)	193 cm (6 ft 4 in)
2	Igor Klander	2 March 1965 (aged 21)	196 cm (6 ft 5 in)
3	Hervé Mazzon	12 June 1959 (aged 27)	192 cm (6 ft 4 in)
5	Éric Bouvier	5 January 1961 (aged 25)	196 cm (6 ft 5 in)
6	Lionel Devos		201 cm (6 ft 7 in)
7	Jean-Marc Jurkovitz	20 April 1963 (aged 23)	196 cm (6 ft 5 in)
8	Stéphane Faure	11 January 1957 (aged 29)	194 cm (6 ft 4 in)
9	Laurent Tillie	1 December 1963 (aged 22)	193 cm (6 ft 4 in)
10	Olivier Rossard	31 August 1965 (aged 21)	195 cm (6 ft 5 in)
11	Bertrand Faitg		186 cm (6 ft 1 in)
12	Alain Fabiani (C)	14 September 1958 (aged 28)	186 cm (6 ft 1 in)
14	Patrick Duflos	29 December 1965 (aged 20)	188 cm (6 ft 2 in)

== Czechoslovakia ==
Head coach: K. Láznička, M. Nekola

Name	1986 club
M. Chernoušek	
Krejčí	
Rybníček	
Pavel Barborka	
Rajský	
Zdeněk Kaláb	
Novotný	
H. Jamka	
Šomek	
Bronislav Mikyska	
Štefan Chrtianský	
Šmíd	

== Italy ==
Head coach: Silvano Prandi

Name	1986 club
Franco Bertoli	Panini Modena
Luca Cantagalli	Panini Modena
Guido De Luigi	Bistefani Torino
Giovanni Errichiello	Santal Parma
Claudio Galli	Enermix Milano
Andrea Gardini	Tartarini Bologna
Alessandro Lazzeroni	Enermix Milano
Andrea Lucchetta	Panini Modena
Luca Milocco	Enermix Milano
Liano Petrelli	Santal Parma
Fabio Vullo	Panini Modena
Andrea Zorzi	Santal Parma
