= Touretski =

Touretski, Turetski, Turetsky or Turetskyi (Russian: Турецкий) is a Slavic masculine surname meaning Turkish. It is also a Jewish name from Belarus and Lithuania given to people who inhabited Turets in Belarus. Its feminine counterpart is Touretskaya, Turetskaya or Turetskaia. Notable people with the surname include:

- Alexandra Touretski (born 1994), Swiss swimmer, daughter of Gennadi
- Gennadi Touretski (1949–2020), Russian swimming coach
