= Swimming at the 1988 Summer Olympics – Women's 200 metre individual medley =

Making waves in Seoul:1988 woman's 200m IM

Women's 200 metre individual medley at the Games of the XXIV Olympiad
- Venue: Jamsil Indoor Swimming Pool
- Date: 24 September 1988 (heats & finals)
- Competitors: 37 from 25 nations
- Winning time: 2:12.59 OR

Medalists
1st place, gold medalist(s)		Daniela Hunger	East Germany
2nd place, silver medalist(s)		Yelena Dendeberova	Soviet Union
3rd place, bronze medalist(s)		Noemi Lung	Romania

The women's 200 metre individual medley event at the 1988 Summer Olympics took place on 24 September at the Jamsil Indoor Swimming Pool in Seoul, South Korea.

== Records ==
Prior to this competition, the existing world and Olympic records were as follows.

World record	Ute Geweniger (GDR)	2:11.73	Magdeburg, East Germany	4 July 1981
Olympic record	Tracy Caulkins (USA)	2:12.64	Los Angeles, United States	3 August 1984

The following records were established during the competition:

Date	Round	Name	Nation	Time	Record
24 September	Final A	Daniela Hunger	East Germany	2:12.59	OR

== Results ==
=== Heats ===
Rule: The eight fastest swimmers advance to final A (Q), while the next eight to final B (q).

Rank	Heat	Name	Nationality	Time	Notes
1	4	Yelena Dendeberova	Soviet Union	2:15.30	Q
2	3	Noemi Lung	Romania	2:15.55	Q
3	5	Daniela Hunger	East Germany	2:16.23	Q
4	4	Marianne Muis	Netherlands	2:16.60	Q
5	4	Lin Li	China	2:17.09	Q
6	3	Jodie Clatworthy	Australia	2:17.29	Q
7	5	Anca Pătrășcoiu	Romania	2:17.39	Q
8	5	Whitney Hedgepeth	United States	2:17.45	Q
9	3	Birgit Lohberg-Schulz	West Germany	2:17.46	q
10	5	Jean Hill	Great Britain	2:17.57	q
11	5	Anette Philipsson	Sweden	2:18.86	q
12	5	Yuliya Bogacheva	Soviet Union	2:19.07	q
13	3	Anamarija Petričević	Yugoslavia	2:19.38	q
14	3	Mildred Muis	Netherlands	2:19.46	q
15	4	Allison Higson	Canada	2:19.54	q, WD
16	5	Roberta Felotti	Italy	2:19.62	q
17	4	Yoshie Nishioka	Japan	2:20.20	q
18	5	Svenja Schlicht	West Germany	2:20.31	
19	2	Donna Procter	Australia	2:21.79	
20	2	Annette Poulsen	Denmark	2:21.83	
21	4	Silvia Parera	Spain	2:22.20	
22	2	Hiroyo Harada	Japan	2:22.59	
23	3	Zara Long	Great Britain	2:22.64	
24	2	Ragnheiður Runólfsdóttir	Iceland	2:22.65	
25	4	Manuela Dalla Valle	Italy	2:22.85	
26	2	Michelle Smith	Ireland	2:25.53	
27	2	Marlene Bruten	Mexico	2:26.89	
28	1	Carwai Seto	Chinese Taipei	2:27.72	
29	1	Patricia Kohlmann	Mexico	2:29.61	
30	2	Valentina Aracil	Argentina	2:31.53	
31	1	Dipika Chanmugam	Sri Lanka	2:33.58	
32	1	Annemarie Munk	Hong Kong	2:34.32	
33	1	Kimberly Chen	Chinese Taipei	2:35.11	
34	1	Sharon Pickering	Fiji	2:35.22	
35	1	Angela Birch	Fiji	2:39.20	
	3	Mary Wayte	United States	DSQ	
	3	Tanya Dangalakova	Bulgaria	DNS	

=== Finals ===
==== Final B ====
Rank	Lane	Name	Nationality	Time	Notes
9	7	Mildred Muis	Netherlands	2:17.73	
10	4	Birgit Lohberg-Schulz	West Germany	2:17.85	
11	5	Jean Hill	Great Britain	2:19.20	
12	3	Anette Philipsson	Sweden	2:19.35	
13	1	Roberta Felotti	Italy	2:19.63	
13	2	Anamarija Petričević	Yugoslavia	2:19.63	
15	6	Yuliya Bogacheva	Soviet Union	2:19.91	
16	8	Yoshie Nishioka	Japan	2:20.43	

==== Final A ====
Rank	Lane	Name	Nationality	Time	Notes
1st place, gold medalist(s)	3	Daniela Hunger	East Germany	2:12.59	OR
2nd place, silver medalist(s)	4	Yelena Dendeberova	Soviet Union	2:13.31	
3rd place, bronze medalist(s)	5	Noemi Lung	Romania	2:14.85	
4	7	Jodie Clatworthy	Australia	2:16.31	
5	6	Marianne Muis	Netherlands	2:16.40	
6	1	Anca Pătrășcoiu	Romania	2:16.70	
7	2	Lin Li	China	2:17.42	
8	8	Whitney Hedgepeth	United States	2:17.99	
