= Umaras =

Umaras is a surname. Notable people with the surname include:

- Gintautas Umaras (born 1963), Lithuanian cyclist
- Mindaugas Umaras (born 1968), Lithuanian cyclist
