= Leonov =

Leonov (masculine, Russian: Леонов) or Leonova (feminine, Russian: Леоновa) is a Russian surname. Notable people with the surname include:

- Aleksandra Leonova (born 1964), Russian women's basketball player
- Aleksandr Leonov (born 1978), Russian boxer
- Alena Leonova (born 1990), Russian figure skater
- Alexei Leonov (1934–2019), Russian/Soviet cosmonaut; the first person to walk in space
- Elena Leonova (born 1973), Russian Soviet pair skater
- Leonid Leonov, prominent Soviet novelist
- Nikolai Leonov, Soviet KGB officer
- Sergey Leonov (born 1983), Russian politician
- Viktor Leonov (1916–2003), Soviet Sailor and two time Hero of the Soviet Union
- Yevgeny Leonov, popular Soviet actor
- Ihor Leonov, Ukrainian footballer, defender, known for playing with Shakhtar Donetsk
