= Oleksandr Sorokalet =

Oleksandr Sorokalet may refer to:

- Oleksandr Sorokalet (footballer) (1957–2009), Soviet Ukrainian football player
- Oleksandr Sorokalet (volleyball) (born 1959), Soviet Ukrainian volleyball player
