= Tibor Fogarasi =

Hungarian chess grandmaster (born 1969)

Personal information
- Born: November 21, 1969 (age 56) Szolnok, Hungary

Chess career
- Country: Hungary
- Title: Grandmaster (2003)
- Peak rating: 2515 (July 1995)

Tibor Fogarasi (born 21 November 1969) is a Hungarian chess grandmaster.

== Chess career ==
Fogarasi was awarded the Grandmaster title in 2003, having achieved the required norms at the HUNGAROIL 1995 tournament in Budapest in December 1995, in the 2001–02 Hungarian Team Championship, and at the 28th Elekes Memorial in Budapest in May 2003. He played for the Hungarian national team twice (in 1991 and 1995) at the Mitropa Cup.

Fogarasi won or placed near the top in several tournaments: tied for 1st–2nd at the FS08 GM tournament in Budapest (1994), tied for 2nd–3rd at the FS10 GM tournament in Budapest (1994), 1st at the Hungaroil tournament in Siófok (1994), tied for 1st–2nd at the FS02 GM tournament in Budapest (2000), 2nd at the Elekes Memorial in Budapest (2003), 2nd at the FS16 GM tournament in Budapest (2004), tied for 1st–2nd at the FS02 GM tournament in Budapest (2005), tied for 1st–3rd at the Elekes Memorial in Budapest (2005), and 2nd at the GM-B tournament in Balatonlelle (2005). He reached his peak rating of 2515 in July 1995.

== Club career ==
In Hungary, Fogarasi played for Mátyásföldi Lawn Tenis Club (known as Statisztika PSC until 2008) until 2015, and has since played for Pénzügyőr Sport Egyesület. In the Austrian Chess Bundesliga, he played for SK Sparkasse Fürstenfeld from 1992 to 1994 and from 2003 to 2006. Fogarasi also participated in the European Club Cup in 1990 with Budapesti Honvéd SE and in 1998 with SK Sparkasse Fürstenfeld.

== Books ==
- Nagy mesterek, nagy elnézések (Great Masters, Great Blunders), Magyar Sakkvilág
- Félszáz kedvenc játszmám (Fifty of My Favorite Games), Magyar Sakkvilág
