= Honvéd =

Honvéd or Honved may refer to:

== Hungarian Army ==
- Royal Hungarian Honvéd (1867–1918)
- Royal Hungarian Army (1920–1945)
- Hungarian Defence Force (1946–present)

== Hungarian sports teams ==
- Budapest Honvéd FC, a Hungarian football team
- Budapesti Honvéd SE (athletics)
- Budapesti Honvéd SE (canoeing)
- Budapesti Honvéd SE (fencing)
- Budapesti Honvéd SE (men's water polo), a Hungarian water polo team
- Budapesti Honvéd SE (men's basketball), a Hungarian basketball team
- Budapesti Honvéd SE (swimming)
- Kaposvári Honvéd SE, a defunct association football team
- Miskolci Honvéd SE, a defunct association football team
- Szegedi Honvéd SE, a Hungarian association football club from Szeged
- Szentendrei Honvéd SE, a defunct association football team
