= Svetlana Isakova =

Svetlana Isakova may refer to:

- Svetlana Isakova (swimmer)
- Svetlana Isakova (alpine skier)

== See also ==
- Svetlana Issakova, Estonian figure skater
