= Vladimir Shkurikhin =

Russian volleyball player (1958–2017)

Personal information
- Nickname: Владимир Шкурихин
- Born: July 26, 1958 Izhevsk, Russian SFSR, Soviet Union
- Died: November 25, 2017 (aged 59) Moscow, Russia
- Height: 2.01 m (6 ft 7 in)

Volleyball information
- Position: Opposite
- Number: 5

National team
- Years: Team
- 1981–1989: Soviet Union
Honours
Men's volleyball
Representing Soviet Union
Olympic Games
Silver medal – second place	1988 Seoul	Team
World Championship
Gold medal – first place	1982 Argentina
Silver medal – second place	1986 France	Team
World Cup
Gold medal – first place	1981 Japan
Silver medal – second place	1985 Japan
Bronze medal – third place	1989 Japan
Goodwill Games
Gold medal – first place	1986 Moscow
Friendship Games
Gold medal – first place	1984 Havana
European Championship
Gold medal – first place	1981 Bulgaria
Gold medal – first place	1983 East Germany
Gold medal – first place	1985 Netherlands
Gold medal – first place	1987 Belgium
World U21 Championship
Gold medal – first place	1977 Brazil	Under-21
European Junior Championship
Gold medal – first place	1977 France	Under-20

Vladimir Shkurikhin (Russian: Владимир Шкурихин, 26 July 1958 – 25 November 2017) was a Russian volleyball player who competed for the Soviet Union in the 1988 Summer Olympicsin Seoul.

In 1988, Shkurikhin was part of the Soviet team that won the silver medal in the Olympic tournament. He played in all seven matches.
