= Jean-Marc Jurkovitz =

French volleyball player (born 1963)

Personal information
- Nationality: French
- Born: 20 April 1963 (age 61); Paris, France

Sport
- Sport: Volleyball

Jean-Marc Jurkovitz (born 20 April 1963) is a French volleyball player. He competed in the men's tournament at the 1988 Summer Olympics.
