= Aleksey Kuznetsov (swimmer) =

Russian swimmer

Personal information
- Born: 1 November 1968 (age 57)

Sport
- Sport: Swimming

Aleksey Kuznetsov (born 1 November 1968) is a Russian swimmer. He competed in two events at the 1988 Summer Olympics.
