= Leonídio de Pra =

Brazilian volleyball player (born 1961)

Personal information
- Full name: Leonídio Pasquali de Pra Filho
- Born: 5 September 1961 (age 64) Rio de Janeiro, Brazil
- Height: 1.98 m (6 ft 6 in)

Sport
- Sport: Volleyball

Leonídio de Pra (born 5 September 1961) is a Brazilian volleyball player. He competed in the men's tournament at the 1988 Summer Olympics in Seoul.
