= Olga Yevkova =

Russian basketball player

Olympic medal record

Women's basketball

Representing the Soviet Union
Bronze medal – third place	1988 Seoul	Team competition

Olga Yevkova (born 15 July 1965) is a Russian former basketball player who competed in the 1988 Summer Olympics.
