= José Carlos Brunoro =

Brazilian sports executive

José Carlos Brunoro (Santo André, 11 June 1950), commonly known as Brunoro, was the CEO of Palmeiras, one of Brazil's largest soccer teams, and the co-founder of Grêmio Osasco Audax Esporte Clube. He has over 40 years of experience in professional sports in a plethora of positions: professional athlete, trainer, coach, sports executive, sports marketing consultant, appointed member of the national council for sports (CNE) by Brazil’s ministry of sports, among others. Brunoro held executive positions in different professional sports such as volleyball, soccer, Formula One, and basketball.

== Palmeiras ==
Between 1992 and 1996, Brunoro was a soccer executive at Palmeiras and signed young players like Rivaldo, Roberto Carlos, who are now recognized as some of the best of all times. On June 12 1993, Palmeiras won the São Paulo championship, beating the rival Corinthians 4x0 in the final. The last major title that the club had won was in 1976, 17 years prior to that one.

In January 2013, Brunoro became the CEO of Palmeiras, Brazil’s fourth largest team with over 10 million fans.

In the beginning of his mandate as CEO, in January 2013, Brunoro ended speculations about bringing Argentine superstar Juan Román Riquelme to play for Palmeiras. The club tried to hire Argentine head coach Marcelo Bielsa, who refused to join Palmeiras. In December 2014, it was announced that Brunoro would no longer be Palmeiras CEO.

== Audax ==
In 2003, Brunoro co-founded Audax with Abilio Diniz and Fernando Solleiro. From 2003 to 2013, Brunoro led Audax. He left the project to become CEO of Palmeiras. Audax, led by Brunoro, organized tryouts for about 70 thousand players to select athletes.

In 2016, Audax reached the final of São Paulo Championship, eliminating São Paulo in the quarter-finals 4x1, and Corinthians in the semi-final at Corinthians home, where the team had won all its 12 matches in 2016.

== Other professional sports projects ==
Brunoro was a professional volleyball player, trainer, assistant coach, and head coach. For seven years, he was a trainer. As part of the coaching staff, Brazil's volleyball national team won silver medal in the summer Olympics in 1984 in Los Angeles. During six years, between 1996 and 2002, he was an executive in Formula One, managing the career of racer Pedro Paulo Diniz in teams Ligier, Arrows, and Sauber.

He was the co-author of the book Soccer 100% professional, launched in 1997 by publisher Gente.

In 2004, he was appointed member of national council for sports (CNE) of Brazil’s ministry of sports.

In 2009, he was named technical director of Brazil’s confederation of basketball. In 2011, Brazil men’s basketball national team qualified for the summer Olympics after 16 years.

He founded BSB (Brunoro Sports Business) in 1997. The company specializes in consulting in sports marketing and participated in the organization of X-Games in Foz do Iguaçu, south of Brazil.

In May 2016, Brunoro was announced as San Francisco Deltas consulting general manager. Brunoro’s primary responsibilities include building the new pro soccer team's soccer philosophy and recruiting technical staff and players.
