= Mikheil Giorgadze (athlete) =

Georgian water polo player

Personal information
- Born: 14 March 1961 (age 65) Kutaisi, Soviet Union

Sport
- Sport: Water polo
Medal record
Representing the Soviet Union
Olympic Games
Bronze medal – third place	1988 Seoul	Team competition
World Championships
Gold medal – first place	1982 Guayaquil	Team competition
European Championships
Gold medal – first place	1983 Rome	Team competition
Gold medal – first place	1985 Sofia	Team competition
Gold medal – first place	1987 Strasbourg	Team competition
Silver medal – second place	1981 Split	Team competition

Mikhail Giorgadze (born 14 March 1961) is a Georgian former water polo player who competed in the 1988 Summer Olympics.

== See also ==
- Soviet Union men's Olympic water polo team records and statistics
- List of Olympic medalists in water polo (men)
- List of men's Olympic water polo tournament goalkeepers
- List of World Aquatics Championships medalists in water polo
