= Ilian Kaziyski =

Bulgarian volleyball player (born 1960)

Personal information
- Nationality: Bulgarian
- Born: 9 August 1960 (age 64); Sofia, Bulgaria

Sport
- Sport: Volleyball

Ilian Kaziyski (Bulgarian: Илиян Казийски, born 9 August 1960) is a Bulgarian volleyball player. He competed in the men's tournament at the 1988 Summer Olympics.
