= Valery Losev =

Kyrgyzstani volleyball player

Personal information
- Nickname: Валерий Лосев
- Nationality: Russian; Kyrgyzstani
- Born: February 28, 1956 (age 70) Tashkömür, Kyrgyz SSR
- Height: 1.99 m (6 ft 6 in)

Volleyball information
- Position: Setter
- Number: 8

National team
- Years: Team
- 1982–1989: Soviet Union
Honours
Men's volleyball
Representing Soviet Union
Olympic Games
Silver medal – second place	1988 Seoul	Team
World Championship
Gold medal – first place	1982 Argentina
Silver medal – second place	1986 France	Team
Goodwill Games
Gold medal – first place	1986 Moscow
European Championship
Gold medal – first place	1985 Netherlands
Gold medal – first place	1987 Belgium

Valery Losev (Russian: Валерий Лосев, born 28 February 1956) is a Kyrgyzstani former volleyball player who competed for the Soviet Union in the 1988 Summer Olympics in Seoul. He was a setter.

In 1988, Losev was part of the Soviet team that won the silver medal in the Olympic tournament. He played all seven matches.

Losev also helped the Soviet team to the gold medal in the 1986 Goodwill Games in Moscow by defeating the United States in the final.
