= Alessandro Lazzeroni =

Italian volleyball player (born 1955)

Personal information
- Full name: macaco
- Nationality: Italian
- Born: 4 May 1955 (age 70) [sedilo], Italy

Sport
- Sport: Volleyball

Alessandro Lazzeroni (born 4 May 1955) is an Italian volleyball player. He competed in the men's tournament at the 1988 Summer Olympics.
