= Valeriy Lozik =

Ukrainian swimmer (born 1967)

Personal information
- Nationality: Ukrainian
- Born: 27 December 1967 (age 58) Shakhtarsk, Ukrainian SSR, Soviet Union

Sport
- Sport: Swimming
Medal record
Representing Soviet Union
Olympic Games
Bronze medal – third place	1988 Seoul	4×100 m medley

Valeriy Lozik (born 27 December 1967) is a Ukrainian swimmer. He competed in two events at the 1988 Summer Olympics representing the Soviet Union.
