= Inna Abramova =

Russian swimmer

Inna Touretskaia
Personal information
- Full name: Inna Touretskaia
- Nationality: Russian, Australian
- Born: 23 October 1966 (age 59) Gomel, Byelorussian SSR, Soviet Union
- Height: 172 cm (5 ft 8 in)
- Weight: 63 kg (139 lb)
- Spouse: Gennadi Touretski
- Children: Alexandra Touretski

Sport
- Sport: Swimming
- Strokes: Freestyle
- Coach: Gennadi Touretski

Inna Vladimirovna Abramova (born 23 October 1966) is a Soviet swimmer. She competed in two events at the 1988 Summer Olympics. She placed 14th in the Women's 50 meters Freestyle with and 5th in the Women's 100 meters Freestyle Relay.
