= Tsvetan Florov =

Bulgarian volleyball player (born 1958)

Personal information
- Nationality: Bulgarian
- Born: 6 September 1958 (age 66); Montana, Bulgaria

Sport
- Sport: Volleyball

Tsvetan Florov (Bulgarian: Цветан Флоров, born 6 September 1958) is a Bulgarian volleyball player. He competed in the men's tournament at the 1988 Summer Olympics.
