= Alain Fabiani =

French volleyball player (born 1958)

Personal information
- Nationality: French
- Born: 14 September 1958 (age 66); Algiers, Algeria

Sport
- Sport: Volleyball

Alain Fabiani (born 14 September 1958) is a French volleyball player. He competed in the men's tournament at the 1988 Summer Olympics.
