= Yelena Dendeberova =

Soviet swimmer (born 1969)

Personal information
- Born: 4 May 1969 (age 57)
Medal record
Women's swimming
Representing the Soviet Union
Olympic Games
Silver medal – second place	1988 Seoul	200 m medley
World Championships (LC)
Silver medal – second place	1986 Madrid	200 m medley
European Championships (LC)
Silver medal – second place	1985 Sofia	4×100 m medley
Silver medal – second place	1987 Strasbourg	400 m medley
Bronze medal – third place	1985 Sofia	400 m freestyle

Yelena Yuryevna Dendeberova (Russian: Елена Юръевна Дендеберова, born 4 May 1969) is a former medley swimmer from the Soviet Union, who won the silver medal in the 200 m individual medley at the 1988 Summer Olympics in Seoul, South Korea. She also competed in the 1992 Summer Olympics, for the Unified Team.

She currently works as a coach at the “Ekran” Specialized Children’s and Youth Sports School (SChOR) in Saint Petersburg. Her swimmers are world, European, and Russian champions and record holders. Among them are Miron Lifintsev and Egor Kornev, and others.
