= Alexandra Touretski =

Swiss swimmer

Sasha Touretski
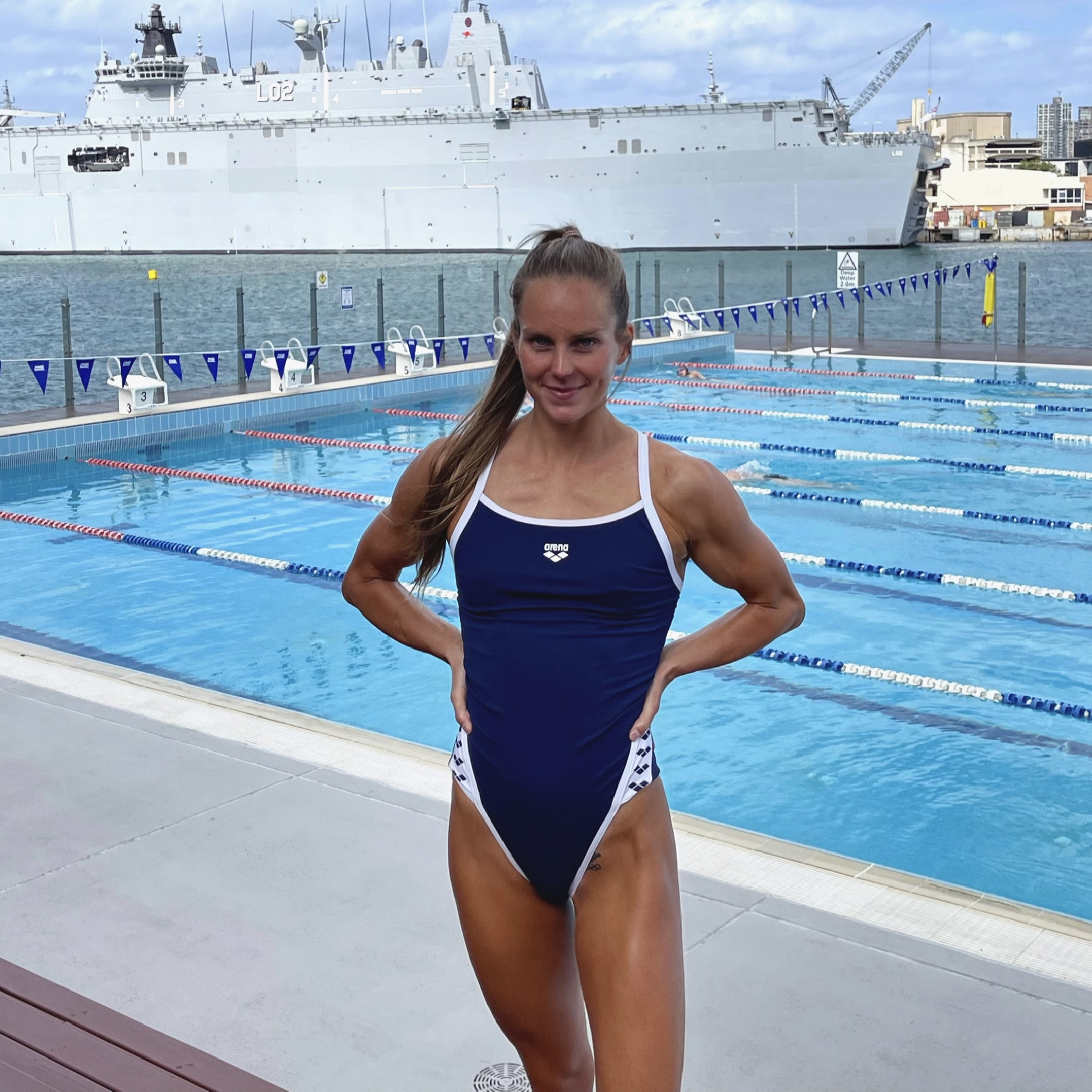
- Touretski in 2021

Personal information
- Full name: Alexandra Sasha Touretski
- Nationality: Swiss
- Born: 20 September 1994 (age 31) Canberra, Australia
- Height: 168 cm (5 ft 6 in)
- Weight: 55 kg (121 lb)
- Spouse: Maxim Lobanovszkij
- Parents: Gennadi Touretski, Inna Abramova

Sport
- Sport: Swimming
- Strokes: Freestyle Sprint
- Coach: Gennadi Touretski (father)

Sasha Touretski (born 20 September 1994) is a Swiss freestyle swimmer. She competed in the Women’s 50 metre freestyle and in the Women’s 4x100 metre freestyle events at the 2016 Summer Olympics.

Sasha Touretski is the daughter of the famous swimming coach Gennadi Touretski. She was born in Canberra, where her father worked at the time. In 2004 she moved to Switzerland with her family. Sasha fluently speaks, English, German, Italian and Russian.
