= Svetlana Kuzmina =

Russian swimmer

Personal information
- Born: 18 June 1969 (age 57) Novokuybyshevsk, Kuybyshev Oblast, Russian SFSR, Soviet Union
- Height: 1.76 m (5 ft 9 in)
- Weight: 71 kg (157 lb)

Sport
- Sport: Swimming
Medal record
Women's swimming
Representing the Soviet Union
European Championships
Silver medal – second place	1985 Sofia	4×100 m medley
Bronze medal – third place	1987 Strasbourg	200 m breaststroke
Summer Universiade
Gold medal – first place	1991 Sheffield	200m breaststroke

Svetlana Kuzmina (Russian: Светлана Кузьмина; born 18 June 1969) is a retired Soviet breaststroke swimmer who won two medals in the 4 × 100 m medley relay at the 1985 and 1987 European Aquatics Championships. She also competed in the 100 m and 200 m breaststroke at the 1988 Summer Olympics, but did not reach the finals. She won a gold medal in the 200 m breaststroke at the 1991 Summer Universiade.

After retirement, she competed for Lada, Tolyatti in the masters category in the 2000s.
