= Yuliya Bohachova =

Ukrainian swimmer

Personal information
- Nationality: Ukrainian
- Born: 7 September 1970 (age 55)

Sport
- Sport: Swimming

Yuliya Bohachova (born 7 September 1970) is a Ukrainian breaststroke and medley swimmer. She competed in two events at the 1988 Summer Olympics representing the Soviet Union.
