= Budapesti Honvéd SE (swimming) =

Hungarian swimming club

Club information
- Full name: Budapesti Honvéd Sportegyesület
- Short name: BHSE
- City: Budapest, Hungary
- Founded: 1950
- Home pool: Honvéd Sportuszoda
- Chairman: dr. István Simicskó; István Gergely (executive)

Swimming
- Head coach: Éva Kiss
- League: Hungarian Championship

The Budapesti Honvéd SE Swimming section was created in 1950 and is one of the most successful athletics teams in Hungary. Homeground and training place are the club's own Honvéd Sportuszoda.

== Achievements ==
Competitions	Gold	Silver	Bronze	Total
Summer Olympic Games	2	2	2	6
World Championships (LC)	3	1	3	7
European Championships (LC)	7	8	4	19

== Notable athletes ==
- (Hungary) Tamás Deutsch
- (Hungary) András Hargitay
- (Hungary) Kristóf Milák
- (Hungary) Imre Nyéki
- (Hungary) Csaba Sós
- (Hungary) József Szabó
- (Hungary) Liliána Szilágyi
- (Hungary) György Tumpek
- (Hungary) Zoltán Verrasztó
