= Fanni Gyurinovics =

Hungarian swimmer (born 2001)

Personal information
- Born: 24 October 2001 (age 24) Baja, Hungary

Sport
- Sport: Swimming
- Strokes: Freestyle
Medal record
Representing Hungary
Women's swimming
European Junior Championships
Gold medal – first place	2016 Hódmezővásárhely	4×200 m freestyle
Gold medal – first place	2017 Netanya	4×200 m freestyle
Gold medal – first place	2017 Netanya	4×100 m mixed freestyle
Gold medal – first place	2018 Helsinki	4×200 m freestyle
Silver medal – second place	2016 Hódmezővásárhely	4×100 m mixed freestyle
Silver medal – second place	2017 Netanya	4×100 m medley
Bronze medal – third place	2018 Helsinki	4×100 m mixed freestyle
Women's lifesaving
World Games
Gold medal – first place	2022 Birmingham	4x50 m obstacle
Silver medal – second place	2022 Birmingham	4x50 m medley

Fanni Gyurinovics (born 24 October 2001) is a Hungarian swimmer. She competed in the women's 100 metre freestyle event at the 2017 World Aquatics Championships.
