= Dániel Sós =

Hungarian swimmer

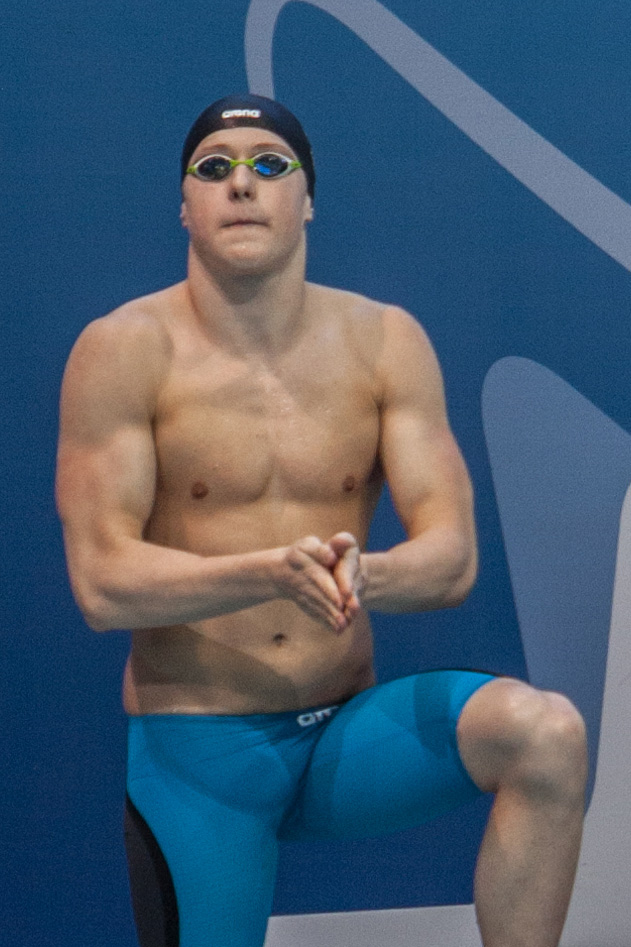

Personal information
- Born: 10 August 1998 (age 27)

Sport
- Sport: Swimming

Dániel Sós (born 10 August 1998) is a Hungarian swimmer. He competed in the men's 200 metre individual medley event at the 2017 World Aquatics Championships.

Sós swam for the University of Louisville from 2018 to 2022.
