= Aleksandra Leonova =

Russian basketball player

Personal information
- Born: 4 September 1964 (age 61) Pyatigorsk
- Height: 176 cm (5 ft 9 in)
- Weight: 63 kg (139 lb)
Medal record
Women's basketball
Representing the Soviet Union
Olympic Games
Bronze medal – third place	1988 Seoul	Team competition

Aleksandra Aleksandrovna Leonova (Russian: Александра Александровна Леонова; born 4 September 1964, in Pyatigorsk) is a Russian former basketball player who competed in the 1988 Summer Olympics.
