= Mindaugas Umaras =

Lithuanian cyclist (born 1968)

Personal information
- Born: 1 July 1968 (age 58) Kaunas, Lithuanian SSR, Soviet Union

Cycling career
- Sport: Cycling
Medal record
Men's cycling
Representing Soviet Union
Olympic Games
Gold medal – first place	1988 Seoul	Team pursuit

Mindaugas Umaras (born 1 July 1968) is a Lithuanian cyclist. He competed in the team pursuit event at the 1988 Summer Olympics winning a gold medal.
