= Flóra Molnár =

Hungarian swimmer

Personal information
- Born: 2 March 1998 (age 28)

Sport
- Sport: Swimming

Flóra Molnár (born 2 March 1998) is a Hungarian swimmer. She competed in the women's 50 metre freestyle event at the 2016 Summer Olympics. She finished in 25th place in the heats with a time of 25.07 and she did not advance to the semi-finals.
