= Gennadi Touretski =

Swimming coach (1949–2020)

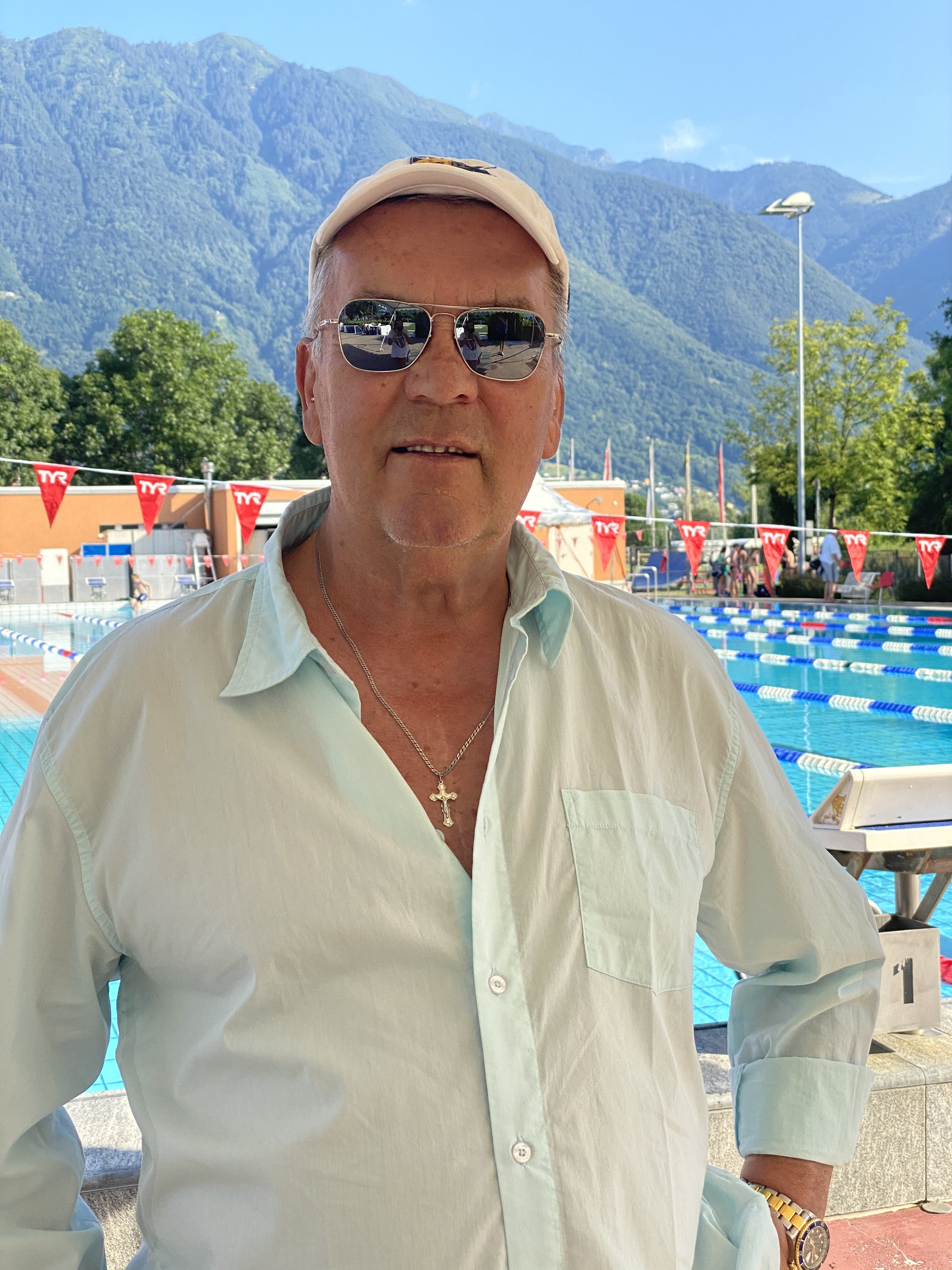
- Touretski in 2020
- Born: Геннадий Геннадьевич Турецкий; 17 July 1949; Leningrad, USSR
- Died: 7 August 2020 (aged 71); Switzerland
- Occupation: Swimming coach
- Known for: coach of Alexander Popov, Michael Klim and Ian Thorpe
- Spouse: Inna Abramova
- Children: Alexandra Touretski, Svetlana Turetskaya

Gennadi Gennadiyevich Touretski (Russian: Геннадий Геннадьевич Турецкий, 17 July 1949 – 7 August 2020) was a swimming coach, best known for training multiple Olympic gold medalists Alexander Popov and Michael Klim through the 1990s to early 2000s at the Australian Institute of Sport (AIS). In 2011 he trained Ian Thorpe in Switzerland.

== Biography ==
Touretski was born in Leningrad (now Saint-Petersburg), USSR, where he studied in more than one university, obtaining diploma in biomechanics, biochemistry, fluid mechanics and sports physiology. He was trained by the famous Russian swimming coach Alexei Krasikov and competed for 15 years, winning the national championships in the 400 m and 1500 m freestyle in 1968. He barely missed two Olympic Games by finishing third in the trials for the 1968 and fourth for the 1972 Olympics. He was also third in the 1500 m freestyle at the national championships of 1969 and 1970. In 1973 Touretski retired from competitions to become a swimming coach.

According to Krasikov, Touretski was not a dedicated swimmer, but turned into a clever and successful coach, bringing several swimmers, such as Gennadiy Prigoda, to Olympic medals. He was the coach of the Soviet Olympic team in 1988 and 1992. Around 1990 Touretski started working with Alexander Popov, and when in late 1992 Touretski moved from Russia to Australia, Popov followed him there. In Australia, besides Popov Touretski coached such stars as Michael Klim, Matthew Dunn, Ray Hass and Clementine Stoney, bringing them to Olympic and world cup medals.

Touretski lived in Canberra with a wife and daughter and in 1996 became an Australian citizen. In 2001, thieves stole a small safe from his house and when the Australian police recovered it, they found tablets of the banned steroid stanozolol next to the safe in a pond. Touretski was charged with possession of an illegal drug and suspended from coaching starting from 10 April 2001. The charges were later dropped and he was reinstated at the AIS on 14 September 2001, however, he lost most of his trainees except for Popov. Also, hundreds of drug tests have been imposed on Australian swimmers in 2001.

On 6 June 2002, Touretski became involved in a drunken brawl on a plane flying from Singapore to Sydney, and consequently fired by the AIS in July 2002. A similar incident occurred in 1995 when he was jailed for a month in Hawaii, where the plane had to make an emergency landing. In January 2003 he moved to Switzerland and in July 2007 became the head coach of the Swiss swimming team. There, beside Swiss swimmers, he trains a few Ukrainian and Russian athletes, as well as his daughter Alexandra Touretski, and Ian Thorpe who joined him in March 2011.

Touretski was known for his knowledge of biomechanics and for individual approach to every athlete, which often appears unorthodox. For example, he persuaded Klim to focus more on butterfly, as well as to change his crawling technique to the straight-arm "windmill style"; both decisions proved highly successful. His coaching focuses on technique and multiple repetition, with an important addition "If you can't do it exactly right, don't do it at all". Thus, he does not demand mileage, though his trainees do swim a lot anyway. In 2011, Touretski was decorated by the Russian Order of Friendship.

== Bibliography ==
- Alexander Popov, Nager dans le vrai, Le Cherche Midi, Paris, 2001, ISBN 2-86274-879-X.
