= Oleksandr Sorokalet (volleyball) =

Ukrainian volleyball player

Personal information
- Full name: Oleksandr Dmytrovych Sorokalet
- Nickname: Олександр Диитрович Сорокалет
- Born: 27 March 1959 (age 67); Shostka, Ukrainian SSR, Soviet Union
- Height: 194 cm (6 ft 4 in)

Volleyball information
- Position: Outside hitter
- Number: 10

National team
1982–1989	Soviet Union
Honours
Men's volleyball
Representing Soviet Union
Olympic Games
Silver medal – second place	1988 Seoul	Team
World Championship
Gold medal – first place	1982 Argentina
Silver medal – second place	1986 France	Team
Goodwill Games
Gold medal – first place	1986 Moscow
Friendship Games
Gold medal – first place	1984 Havana
European Championship
Gold medal – first place	1983 East Germany
Gold medal – first place	1985 Netherlands
Gold medal – first place	1987 Belgium

Oleksandr Dmytrovych Sorokalet (Ukrainian: Олександр Диитрович Сорокалет, born 27 March 1959) is a Ukrainian former volleyball player who competed for the Soviet Union in the 1988 Summer Olympics.

Sorokalet was born in Shostka.

In 1988, Sorokalet was part of the Soviet team that won the silver medal in the Olympic tournament in Seoul. He played all seven matches.
