= Maxim Lobanovszkij =

Hungarian swimmer (born 1996)

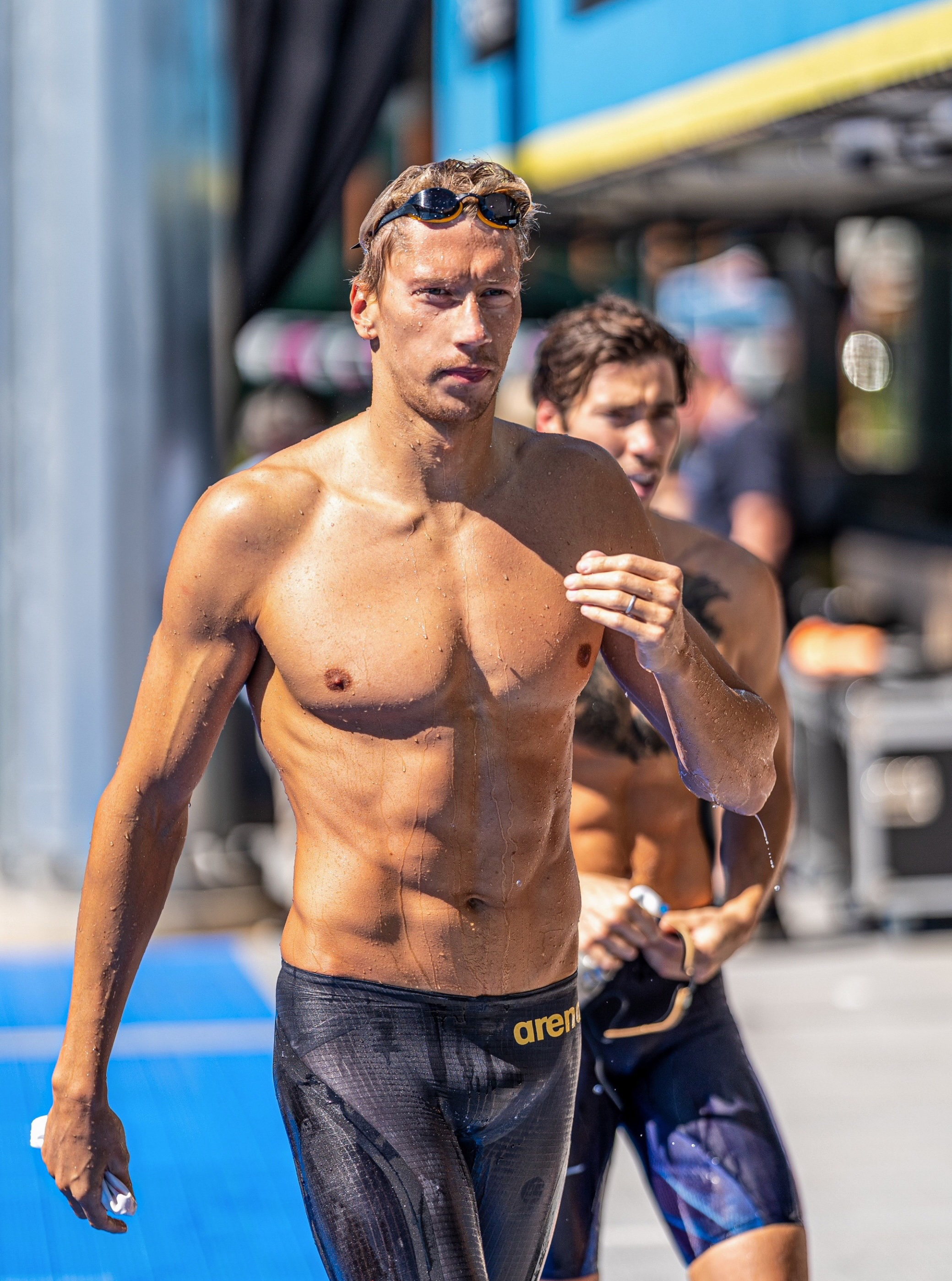
- Lobanovszkij in 2021

Personal information
- Born: January 18, 1996 (age 30) Yuzhno Sakhalinsk
- Height: 2.03 m (6 ft 8 in)

Sport
- Sport: Swimming
- Coach: Gennadi Touretski
Medal record
Representing Hungary
European Championships
Silver medal – second place	2019 Glasgow	4x50 medley relay
Bronze medal – third place	2019 Glasgow	50m freestyle

Maxim Lobanovszkij (born 18 January 1996) is a Hungarian swimmer. From 2018 - 2020, Lobanovszkij was coached and mentored by his father in law, Gennadi Touretski, who was best known for training multiple Olympic gold medalists, such as Alexander Popov, Ian Thorpe and Michael Klim.

In 2018 he competed in the men's 50 metre freestyle event at the 2018 FINA World Swimming Championships (25 m). At the 2019 LEN European Championships (25m), in Glasgow, Scotland, Maxim won a bronze medal in the men's 50 metre freestyle event and a silver medal in the men's 4x50 metre medley relay event. In the same year of 2019, he qualified for the 2020 Summer Olympics in Tokyo, with a time of 21,77. In 2021 he competed in the men's 50 metre freestyle at the 2020 Summer Olympics, in Tokyo, Japan. Lobanovszkij was also a member of the International Swimming League, representing Team Iron.
