= Márk Papp =

Hungarian swimmer

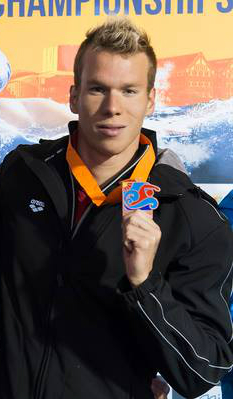

Personal information
- Born: January 8, 1994 (age 32)

Sport
- Sport: Swimming
Medal record
Representing Hungary
European Championships
Bronze medal – third place	2016 Hoorn	5km open water team

Márk Papp (born 8 January 1994) is a Hungarian marathon swimmer. He placed 13th in the men's marathon 10 kilometre event at the 2016 Summer Olympics.
