= Tamás Takács (swimmer) =

Hungarian swimmer

Personal information
- Born: 10 October 1998 (age 27) Budapest, Hungary

Sport
- Country: Hungary
- Sport: Swimming

Tamás Takács (born 10 October 1998) is a Hungarian swimmer. He competed in the 2020 Summer Olympics.
