= Krisztián Takács =

Hungarian swimmer

Personal information
- Nationality: Hungarian
- Born: 30 December 1985 (age 40) Budapest, Hungary
- Height: 1.85 m (6 ft 1 in)
- Weight: 78 kg (172 lb)

Sport
- Sport: Swimming
- Strokes: freestyle, butterfly
- Club: Dunaferr-DVSI
Medal record
Representing Hungary
Men's swimming
European Championships (SC)
Bronze medal – third place	2011 Szczecin	100 m freestyle
Men's lifesaving
World Games
Gold medal – first place	2022 Birmingham	4x50 m obstacle
Gold medal – first place	2022 Birmingham	4x50 m medley

Krisztián Takács (born 30 December 1985 in Budapest) is a Hungarian swimmer, Olympic participant and the current national record holder on 50 metre freestyle.

Takács set the new Hungarian record on 50m freestyle at the 2009 World Aquatics Championships in Rome. First, he broke the former national record, also held by him, during the semi-final heats with a time of 21.65, finishing tied eight with George Bovell of Trinidad and Tobago. At the end of the day the two sprinters faced again to decide the last remaining place in the final. Bovell won the swim-off with a new championship record time of 21.20 and thus qualified for the final, however, Takács also shaved off further two tenths from his time to improve the national record to 21.42.
