= Réka György =

Hungarian swimmer (born 1996)

Personal information
- Born: 25 May 1996 (age 30) Üllő, Hungary
- Height: 1.76 m (5 ft 9 in)
- Weight: 63 kg (139 lb)

Sport
- Sport: Swimming
- Strokes: Freestyle, backstroke, butterfly, medley
- College team: Virginia Tech Hokies

Réka György (born 25 May 1996) is a Hungarian swimmer who currently competes as part of the Virginia Tech swimming team. She competed in the women's 200 metre backstroke event at the 2016 Summer Olympics.

In March 2022, György wrote an open letter criticizing the NCAA in their policy to allow transgender women to participate. Gyorgy had placed 17th in the preliminaries for the 500 freestyle in the NCAA Championships, which made her first alternate and therefore out of the consolation final, which includes the top 16 finishers. In the letter, she stated that she "feels like that final spot was taken away" from her due to the NCAA's decision to allow Lia Thomas to compete.
