= 1990 FIBA World Championship for Women squads =

The 1990 FIBA World Championship for Women was held in Malaysia. The list includes the twelve-women rosters of the sixteen participating countries, totaling 172 players.

== Group A ==
=== Australia ===
- Jenny Reisener
- Joanne Moyle
- Karen Dalton
- Lucille Hamilton
- Marina Moffa
- Michele Timms
- Rachael Sporn
- Robyn Maher
- Samantha Thornton
- Sandy Brondello
- Shelley Gorman
- Tracey Browning
- Head coach:
  Robert Cadee

=== Bulgaria ===
- Evladia Slavcheva
- Kostadinka Radkova
- Krassimira Bannova
- Larissa Sachova
- Lidia Varbanova
- Madlena Staneva
- Mariana Naidenova
- Mariana Tchobanova
- Nina Hadjijankova
- Polina Tzekova
- Sonia Dragomirova
- Vania Popova
- Head coach:
  Ivan Lepichev

=== Italy ===
- Anna Costalunga
- Catarina Pollini
- Cinzia Bianco
- Cinzia Zanotti
- Cristina Rivellini
- Laura Gori
- Mara Fullin
- Marisa Comelli
- Renata Salvestrini
- Silvia Todeschini
- Stefania Passaro
- Stefania Stanzani
- Head coach:
  Aldo Corno

=== Malaysia ===
- Chu Tan Poh
- Eng Lim Hoon
- Fong Chin Kim
- Hung Lee Hai
- Keng Wan Geok
- Leng See Peck
- Maggie Teo
- May Lew Foo
- Nee Chew Kun
- Shan Neo Sheau
- Sim Ooi Ping
- Young Tan Kim
- Head coach:
  Wang Deli

== Group B ==
=== Brazil ===
- Ana Lúcia Mota
- Ana Paula Monteiro
- Hortência Marcari
- Janeth Arcain
- Joycemara Batista
- Maria Paula Silva
- Nádia Lima
- Roseli Gustavo
- Ruth de Souza
- Simone Pontello
- Vânia Teixeira
- Yngrid Cabral
- Head coach:
  Maria Helena Cardoso

=== Canada ===
- Andrea Blackwell
- Anna Stammberger
- Carol Goodale
- Chantal St. Martin
- Cori Blakebrough
- Janet Fowler
- Jodi Evans
- Karla Karch
- Kim Bertholet
- Lori Clarke
- Merelynn Lange
- Michelle Henry
- Head coach:
  Wayne Hussey

=== Japan ===
- Aki Ichijo
- Hiroe Kikizaki
- Hiroko Tanabe
- Kagari Yamada
- Kikuko Mikawa
- Kyomi Sumi
- Mariko Muramatsu
- Mayumi Kuroda
- Mikiko Hagiwara
- Norie Suzuki
- Takako Katō
- Takami Takeuchi
- Head coach:
  Fumikazu Nakagawa

=== Soviet Union ===
- Elen Bounatiants
- Elena Chvaibovitch
- Elena Khoudachova
- Elena Mozgovaia
- Galina Savistskaia
- Irina Chevtchouk
- Irina Minkh
- Irina Soumnikova
- Marina Tkachenko
- Natalia Zassoulskaia
- Olga Ekova
- Svetlana Kuznetsova
- Head coach:
  Evgueni Gomelski

== Group C ==
=== Czechoslovakia ===
- Andrea Chupikova
- Anna Janostinova
- Erika Dobrovicova
- Eva Kaluzakova
- Eva Krizova
- Eva Nemcova
- Irma Valova
- Renata Hirakova
- Vaclava Simonova
- Yveta Bielikova
- Zora Brziakova
- Zuzana Vasilkova
- Head coach:
  Miroslav Vondřička

=== Senegal ===
- Adama Diakhaté
- Adama Diop
- Anemarie Dioh
- Astou Ndiaye-Diatta
- Douty Ndoye
- Khady Diop
- Mame Maty Mbengue
- Martana Kayara
- Marthe Ndiaye
- Nathalie Sagna
- Ramatoulaye Diakhate
- Tegaye Niang
- Head coach:
  Ibrahima Diagne

=== South Korea ===
- Lim Ae-Kueong
- Chun Eun-Sook
- Chung Eun-Soon
- Lee Hyung-Suk
- Seong Jeong-A
- Yoo Jeong-Ae
- Lee Kang-Hee
- Seo Kyong-Hwa
- Choi Kyung-Hee
- Jeong Mi-Kyeong
- Cho Mun-Ju
- Ha Sook-Rye
- Head coach:
  Chung Joo-Hyun

=== United States ===
- Carolyn Jones-Young
- Cynthia Cooper
- Jennifer Azzi
- Katrina McClain
- Lynette Woodard
- Medina Dixon
- Sonja Henning
- Tammy Jackson
- Teresa Edwards
- Vicki Hall
- Vickie Orr
- Vicky Bullett
- Head coach:
  Theresa Grentz

== Group D ==
=== PR China ===
- Xu Chunmei
- Li Dongmei
- Wang Fang
- Ling Guang
- Chu Hui
- Peng Ping
- Liu Qing
- Zheng Wei
- Li Xin
- Xue Cuilan
- Hu Yun
- Zheng Xiulin
- Head coaches:
  Lu Changxin
  Wang Zangxing

=== Cuba ===
- Ana Hernández
- Beatriz Perdomo
- Dalia Henry
- Gestrudis Gomez
- Yudith Águila
- Andrea Borrell
- Liset Castillo
- María León
- Odalys Cala
- Olga Vigil
- Regla Hernandez
- Yamilet Martinez
- Head coaches:
  Tomas Martínez
  Manuel Pérez

=== Yugoslavia ===
- Anđelija Arbutina
- Bojana Milošević
- Danijela Ilić
- Danira Nakić
- Eleonora Wild
- Kornelija Kvesić
- Mara Lakić
- Nina Bjedov
- Razija Mujanović
- Slađana Golić
- Tima Džebo
- Vesna Bajkuša
- Head coaches:
  Mihajlo Vuković
  Miodrag Vesković

=== Zaire ===
- Ana Kano
- Iyoko Lingenga
- Kasala Kamanga
- Lomboto Bofonda
- Lomboto Bompoko
- Mboli Alele
- Mukendi Mbuyi
- Mwabilayi Ntumba
- Ndombasi Nsimbweni
- Nsunda Ngoyi
- Obudu Okako
- Osudu Okako
- Head coaches:
  Ngenda Lomani
  Abongo Malu
