= Shooting at the 1988 Summer Olympics – Men's 10 metre air rifle =

Sports shooting at the Olympics

Men's 10 metre air rifle at the Games of the XXIV Olympiad
- Date: 20 September 1988
- Competitors: 46 from 30 nations
- Winning score: 695.6 (OR)

Medalists
1st place, gold medalist(s)		Goran Maksimović	Yugoslavia
2nd place, silver medalist(s)		Nicolas Berthelot	France
3rd place, bronze medalist(s)		Johann Riederer	West Germany

Men's 10 metre air rifle was one of the thirteen shooting events at the 1988 Summer Olympics. It was the first Olympic three positions competition to feature final shooting.

== Qualification round ==
Rank	Athlete	Country	Score	Notes
1	Goran Maksimović	Yugoslavia	594	Q OR
2	Nicolas Berthelot	France	593	Q
3	Johann Riederer	West Germany	592	Q
4	Harald Stenvaag	Norway	591	Q
5	Robert Foth	United States	591	Q
6	Andreas Wolfram	East Germany	591	Q
7	Attila Záhonyi	Hungary	591	Q
8	An Byung-kyun	South Korea	590	Q (6th: 100)
9	Olivér Gáspár	Hungary	590	(6th: 99)
10	Franck Badiou	France	590	(6th: 98)
11	Petr Kůrka	Czechoslovakia	590	(6th: 98)
12	Ryohei Koba	Japan	589	
12	Lee Eun-chul	South Korea	589	
14	Mart Klepp	Canada	588	
14	Sergei Martynov	Soviet Union	588	
14	Zhang Yingzhou	China	588	
17	Abdul Latif Al Bulushi	Oman	587	
17	Roderick Fitz-Randolph	United States	587	
17	Jan Gundersrud	Norway	587	
17	Juha Hirvi	Finland	587	
17	Pavel Soukeník	Czechoslovakia	587	
17	Matthias Stich	West Germany	587	
17	Hanspeter Ziörjen	Switzerland	587	
24	Gratchia Petikian	Soviet Union	586	
25	Rajmond Debevec	Yugoslavia	585	
25	Guy Lorion	Canada	585	
25	Tapio Säynevirta	Finland	585	
28	Klavs Jørn Christensen	Denmark	584	
29	Xu Xiaoguang	China	583	
29	Itzchak Yonassi	Israel	583	
31	Anders Burvall	Sweden	582	
31	Per Hansson	Sweden	582	
31	Georgi Polyakov	Bulgaria	582	
34	Albert Deuring	Austria	581	
34	Jean-Claude Kremer	Luxembourg	581	
34	Akihiro Mera	Japan	581	
34	Eduard Papirov	Israel	581	
38	Frank Arens	Belgium	580	
38	Jack van Bekhoven	Netherlands	580	
40	Jorge González	Spain	579	
41	Johannes Gufler	Austria	577	
42	Wolfgang Jobst	Australia	574	
42	Gilbert Kaiser	Liechtenstein	574	
44	Pierre-Alain Dufaux	Switzerland	573	
45	Hugo Romero	Ecuador	572	
46	Zal Chitty	Sri Lanka	563	
	Alister Allan	Great Britain		DNS
	Malcolm Cooper	Great Britain		DNS
	Olaf Hess	East Germany		DNS

DNS Did not start – OR Olympic record – Q Qualified for final

== Final ==
Rank	Athlete	Qual	Final	Total	Notes
1st place, gold medalist(s)	Goran Maksimović (YUG)	594	101.6	695.6	OR
2nd place, silver medalist(s)	Nicolas Berthelot (FRA)	593	101.2	694.2	
3rd place, bronze medalist(s)	Johann Riederer (FRG)	592	102.0	694.0	
4	Robert Foth (USA)	591	101.5	692.5	
5	Harald Stenvaag (NOR)	591	101.0	692.0	
6	Attila Záhonyi (HUN)	591	100.4	691.4	
7	An Byung-kyun (KOR)	590	100.7	690.7	
8	Andreas Wolfram (GDR)	591	98.8	689.8	

OR Olympic record

== Sources ==
- XXIVth Olympiad Seoul 1988 Official Report – Volume 2 Part 2 (PDF).
