= Czechoslovakia at the 1988 Summer Olympics =

- IOC code: TCH
- NOC: Czechoslovak Olympic Committee

in Seoul
- Competitors: 163 (110 men and 53 women) in 17 sports
- Flag bearer: Imrich Bugár
- Medals Ranked 17th: Gold 3 Silver 3 Bronze 2 Total 8

Summer Olympics appearances (overview)
- 1920; 1924; 1928; 1932; 1936; 1948; 1952; 1956; 1960; 1964; 1968; 1972; 1976; 1980; 1984; 1988; 1992

Other related appearances
- Bohemia (1900–1912); Czech Republic (1994–pres.); Slovakia (1994–pres.)

Czechoslovakia competed at the 1988 Summer Olympics in Seoul, South Korea, after having boycotted the previous Games in 1984. 163 competitors, 110 men and 53 women, took part in 97 events in 17 sports.

== Medalists ==
| Medal | Name | Sport | Event | Date |
|---|---|---|---|---|
| Gold | Miroslav Varga | Shooting | Men's 50 m rifle prone | 19 September |
| Gold | Jozef Pribilinec | Athletics | Men's 20 km walk | 23 September |
| Gold | Miloslav Mečíř | Tennis | Men's singles | 30 September |
| Silver | Miloslav Bednařík | Shooting | Trap | 20 September |
| Silver | Jan Železný | Athletics | Men's javelin throw | 25 September |
| Silver | Jana Novotná; Helena Suková | Tennis | Women's doubles | 30 September |
| Bronze | Miloslav Mečíř; Milan Šrejber | Tennis | Men's doubles | 29 September |
| Bronze | Jozef Lohyňa | Wrestling | Men's freestyle 82 kg | 1 October |

== Competitors ==
The following is the list of number of competitors in the Games.

| Sport | Men | Women | Total |
|---|---|---|---|
| Athletics | 20 | 3 | 23 |
| Basketball | 0 | 12 | 12 |
| Boxing | 3 | – | 3 |
| Canoeing | 8 | 1 | 9 |
| Cycling | 13 | 0 | 13 |
| Gymnastics | 0 | 8 | 8 |
| Handball | 14 | 15 | 29 |
| Judo | 3 | – | 3 |
| Modern pentathlon | 3 | – | 3 |
| Rowing | 12 | 5 | 17 |
| Shooting | 11 | 3 | 14 |
| Swimming | 6 | 0 | 6 |
| Table tennis | 1 | 3 | 4 |
| Tennis | 2 | 3 | 5 |
| Weightlifting | 5 | – | 5 |
| Wrestling | 9 | – | 9 |
| Total | 110 | 53 | 163 |

== Athletics ==
Men's 10.000 metres

- Martin Vrabel
  - Heat — did not finish (→ did not advance)

Men's Marathon

- Karel David
  - Final — 2"26.12 (→ 55th place)

Men's Discus Throw

- Géjza Valent
  - Qualifying Heat – 63.46m
  - Final – 65.80m (→ 6th place)
- Imrich Bugár
  - Qualifying Heat – 61.94m
  - Final – 60.88m (→ 12th place)

Men's Javelin Throw

- Jan Železný
  - Qualification — 85.90m
  - Final — 84.12m (→ Silver Medal)
- Zdenek Nenadal
  - Qualification — 75.56m (→ did not advance)

Men's Shot Put

- Remigius Machura
  - Qualifying Heat – 20.16m
  - Final – 20.57m (→ 5th place)

Men's Decathlon

- Roman Hraban — 7781 points (→ 20th place)

1. 100 metres — 10.98s
2. Long Jump — 7.07m
3. Shot Put — 15.84m
4. High Jump — 1.79m
5. 400 metres — 49.68s
6. 110m Hurdles — 14.94s
7. Discus Throw — 45.32m
8. Pole Vault — 4.90m
9. Javelin Throw — 60.48m
10. 1.500 metres — 5:06.68s

- Veroslav Valenta — 7442 points (→ 28th place)

1. 100 metres — 11.51s
2. Long Jump — 7.01m
3. Shot Put — 14.17m
4. High Jump — 1.94m
5. 400 metres — 51.216s
6. 110m Hurdles — 15.18s
7. Discus Throw — 45.84m
8. Pole Vault — 4.60m
9. Javelin Throw — 56.28m
10. 1.500 metres — 5:03.17s

Men's 20 km Walk

- Jozef Pribilinec
  - Final — 1:19:57 (→ Gold Medal)
- Roman Mrázek
  - Final — 1:20:43 (→ 5th place)

Men's 50 km Walk

- Pavol Szikora
  - Final — 3:47:04 (→ 10th place)
- Pavol Blazek
  - Final — 3:47:31 (→ 12th place)
- Roman Mrazek
  - Final — 3:50:46 (→ 17th place)

Women's Marathon

- Ludmila Melicherová
  - Final — 2"43.56 (→ 45th place)

Women's Discus Throw

- Zdeňka Šilhavá
  - Qualifying Heat – 66.52m
  - Final – 67.84m (→ 6th place)

Women's Shot Put

- Zdeňka Šilhavá
  - Qualification – 19.74m
  - Final – 18.86m (→ 11th place)
- Sona Vasickova
  - Qualification — did not start (→ did not advance)

Women's Heptathlon

- Zuzana Lajbnerová
  - Final Result — 6252 points (→ 9th place)

== Basketball ==
=== Women's tournament ===
Team roster

The following is the Czechoslovakia roster in the women's basketball tournament of the 1988 Summer Olympics.

Czechoslovakia women's national basketball team – 1988 Summer Olympics roster
Players
Coaches

| Pos. | No. | Name | Age – Date of birth | Height | Club | Ctr. |
|---|---|---|---|---|---|---|
| | 4 | Svatava Kysilková | 23 – 29 December 1964 | | Sparta ČKD Praha | (Czechoslovakia) |
| | 5 | Alena Kašová | 28 – 6 March 1960 | | Slovan CHZJD Bratislava | (Czechoslovakia) |
| | 6 | Eva Kalužáková | 23 – 3 May 1965 | | Sparta ČKD Praha | (Czechoslovakia) |
| | 7 | Ivana Nováková | 23 – 16 July 1965 | | Slavia VŠ Praha | (Czechoslovakia) |
| | 8 | Zuzana Hájková | 25 – 15 January 1963 | | Slavia VŠ Praha | (Czechoslovakia) |
| | 9 | Anna Janoštinová | 20 – 6 April 1968 | | Slavia PF Banská Bystrica | (Czechoslovakia) |
| | 10 | Zora Brziaková | 24 – 14 March 1964 | | Sparta ČKD Praha | (Czechoslovakia) |
| | 11 | Hana Zarevúcká | 27 – 3 March 1961 | | Slavia VŠ Praha | (Czechoslovakia) |
| | 12 | Erika Dobrovičová-Buriánová | 21 – 10 September 1967 | | Slavia PF Banská Bystrica | (Czechoslovakia) |
| | 13 | Eva Křížová | 21 – 20 October 1966 | | Slavia VŠ Praha | (Czechoslovakia) |
| | 14 | Irma Valová | 23 – 26 July 1965 | | Sparta ČKD Praha | (Czechoslovakia) |
| | 15 | Eva Berková | 22 – 23 October 1965 | | Racing Club de France | (France) |

Legend

- Club – describes last
  club before the tournament
- Age – describes age
  on 17 September 1988

Group play

| Pos | Team | Pld | W | L | PF | PA | PD | Pts | Qualification |
|---|---|---|---|---|---|---|---|---|---|
| 1 | United States | 3 | 3 | 0 | 282 | 234 | +48 | 6 | Semifinals |
| 2 | Yugoslavia | 3 | 2 | 1 | 199 | 211 | −12 | 5 | Semifinals |
| 3 | China | 3 | 1 | 2 | 200 | 214 | −14 | 4 | Classification round |
| 4 | Czechoslovakia | 3 | 0 | 3 | 202 | 224 | −22 | 3 | Classification round |

Source: FIBA
Rules for classification: 1) points; 2) head-to-head points; 3) head-to-head goal average; 4) head-to-head number of points scored.

19 September 1988
9:45

Boxscore

| Czechoslovakia | 81–87 | United States |
Scoring by half: 39–37, 42–50
| Pts: Nováková 21; Rebs: Nováková 8 Asts: Kalužáková, Nováková 2 | | Pts: Edwards 24; Rebs: McClain 8 Asts: Edwards 2 |

Jamsil Gymnasium, Seoul

22 September 1988
21:30

Boxscore

| China | 68–64 | Czechoslovakia |
Scoring by half: 36–36, 32–28
| Pts: Zheng 12; Rebs: Han 7 Asts: Xue 3 | | Pts: Dobrovičová 21; Rebs: Dobrovičová 5 Asts: Kalužáková 4 |

Jamsil Gymnasium, Seoul

25 September 1988
9:45

Boxscore

| Czechoslovakia | 57–69 | Yugoslavia |
Scoring by half: 15–41, 42–28
| Pts: Dobrovičová 17; Rebs: Dobrovičová 9 Asts: Kalužáková 3 | | Pts: Nakić 24; Rebs: Dornik 8 Asts: Vangelovska 7 |

Jamsil Gymnasium, Seoul

Classification 5–8

27 September 1988
19:30

Boxscore

| Bulgaria | 81–78 | Czechoslovakia |
Scoring by half: 49–42, 32–36
| Pts: Radkova 25; Rebs: Radkova 6 Asts: Khadzhiyankova, Slavcheva 3 | | Pts: Janoštinová 27; Rebs: Dobrovičová 9 Asts: Kysilková, Nováková 3 |

Jamsil Gymnasium, Seoul

Classification 7/8

28 September 1988
19:30

Boxscore

| South Korea | 77–59 | Czechoslovakia |
Scoring by half: 41–26, 36–33
| Pts: Choi 18; Rebs: Sung 6 Asts: Kim HS 3 | | Pts: Janoštinová 14; Rebs: Janoštinová 10; Asts: Janoštinová, Nováková 3 |

Jamsil Gymnasium, Seoul

== Cycling ==
Thirteen cyclists, all men, represented Czechoslovakia in 1988.

Men's road race

- Jozef Regec
- Luděk Štyks
- Luboš Lom

Men's team time trial

- Vladimír Hrůza
- Vladimír Kinšt
- Milan Křen
- Jozef Regec

Men's sprint

- Vratislav Šustr

Men's individual pursuit

- Roman Čermák

Men's team pursuit

- Svatopluk Buchta
- Zbyněk Fiala
- Pavel Soukup
- Aleš Trčka
- Pavel Tesař

Men's points race

- Luboš Lom

== Modern pentathlon ==
Three male pentathletes represented Czechoslovakia in 1988.

Men's Individual Competition:

- Milan Kadlec — 5130pts (→ 11th place)
- Tomáš Fleissner — 5010pts (→ 19th place)
- Jiří Prokopius — 4903pts (→ 29th place)

Men's Team Competition:

- Kadlec, Fleissner, and Prokopius — 15043pts (→ 6th place)

== Rowing ==
Czechoslovakia was represented by 17 rowers, 12 men and 5 women.

Quadruple Sculls, Men

- Václav Chalupa Jr., Jiří Jakoubek, Pavel Lůžek, Martin Tichý (11th)

Coxed Pairs, Men

- Jan Kabrhel, Jiří Pták, Milan Škopek (7th)

Coxed Fours, Men

- Milan Doleček, Oldřich Hejdušek, Petr Hlídek, Dušan Macháček, Michal Šubrt (8th)

Single Sculls, Women

- Michaela Loukotová (Note: also competed at the 1992 Summer Olympics as Michaela Burešová-Loukotová) (12th)

Quadruple Sculls, Women

- Hana Krejčová, Ľubica Kurhajcová, Blanka Mikysková, Irena Soukupová (5th)

== Swimming ==
Men's 50m Freestyle

- Petr Kladiva
  1. Heat – 23.53 (→ did not advance, 23rd place)

Men's 100m Freestyle

- Petr Kladiva
  1. Heat – 51.39 (→ did not advance, 26th place)

Men's 100m Backstroke

- Pavel Vokoun
  1. Heat – 58.88 (→ did not advance, 30th place)

Men's 200m Backstroke

- Pavel Vokoun
  1. Heat – 2:07.24 (→ did not advance, 28th place)

Men's 100m Breaststroke

- Radek Beinhauer
  1. Heat – 1:04.61 (→ did not advance, 25th place)
- Alexander Marcek
  1. Heat – 1:04.95 (→ did not advance, 28th place)

Men's 200m Breaststroke

- Radek Beinhauer
  1. Heat – 2:18.02
  2. B-Final – 2:18.13 (→ 12th place)
- Alexander Marcek
  1. Heat – 2:18.44
  2. B-Final – 2:18.51 (→ 15th place)

Men's 100m Butterfly

- Robert Wolf
  1. Heat – 55.73 (→ did not advance, 21st place)

Men's 200m Butterfly

- Ondrej Bures
  1. Heat – 2:02.93 (→ did not advance, 22nd place)

Men's 400m Individual Medley

- Ondrej Bures
  1. Heat – 4:29.62 (→ did not advance, 19th place)

Men's 4 × 100 m Medley Relay

- Pavel Vokoun, Radek Beinhauer, Robert Wolf, and Petr Kladiva
  1. Heat – 3:49.90 (→ did not advance, 13th place)

== Tennis ==
Women's Singles Competition

- Regina Rajchrtová
  1. First Round – Lost to Leila Meskhi (Soviet Union) 5-7 5–7
- Jana Novotná
  1. First Round – Defeated Isabelle Demongeot (France) 6-4 6–3
  2. Second Round – Lost to Barbara Paulus (Austria) 4-6 3–6
- Helena Suková
  1. First Round – Bye
  2. Second Round – Lost to Il-Soon Kim (South Korea) 2-6 6-4 2–6

Men's Doubles Competition

- Miloslav Mečíř and Milan Šrejber → Bronze Medal
  1. First Round – Defeated Liu Shuhua and Ma Keqin (China) 7-5 6-1 6–4
  2. Second Round – Defeated Vijay Amritraj and Anand Amritraj (India) 4-6 6-4 4-6 6-4 6–2
  3. Quarterfinals – Defeated Guy Forget and Henri Leconte (France) 3-6 4-6 7-5 6-3 9–7
  4. Semifinals – Lost to Ken Flach and Robert Seguso (United States) 2-6 4-6 1-6
