= Shooting at the 1988 Summer Olympics – Men's 50 metre rifle three positions =

Sports shooting at the Olympics

Men's 50 metre rifle three positions at the Games of the XXIV Olympiad
- Date: 22 September 1988
- Competitors: 47 from 25 nations
- Winning score: 1279.3 (OR)

Medalists
1st place, gold medalist(s)		Malcolm Cooper	Great Britain
2nd place, silver medalist(s)		Alister Allan	Great Britain
3rd place, bronze medalist(s)		Kirill Ivanov	Soviet Union

Men's 50 metre rifle three positions (then known as small-bore free rifle) was one of the thirteen shooting events at the 1988 Summer Olympics. It was the first Olympic three positions competition to feature final shooting. Alister Allan set a new Olympic record in the qualification round but lost the final to his countryman Malcolm Cooper, who thus defended his title from Los Angeles.

== Qualification round ==
Rank	Athlete	Country	Prone	Stand	Kneel	Total	Notes
1	Alister Allan	Great Britain	399	386	396	1181	Q OR
2	Malcolm Cooper	Great Britain	400	387	393	1180	Q
3	Klavs Jørn Christensen	Denmark	399	387	391	1177	Q
4	Glenn Dubis	United States	400	388	386	1174	Q
5	Kirill Ivanov	Soviet Union	399	382	392	1173	Q
6	Harald Stenvaag	Norway	395	389	389	1173	Q
7	Hrachya Petikyan	Soviet Union	394	387	392	1173	Q
8	Goran Maksimović	Yugoslavia	399	383	391	1173	Q
9	Zhang Yingzhou	China	397	386	389	1172	
10	Andreas Wolfram	East Germany	396	385	391	1172	
11	Geir Skirbekk	Norway	397	383	390	1170	
11	Attila Záhonyi	Hungary	398	387	385	1170	
13	Jean-Pierre Amat	France	398	377	394	1169	
13	Daniel Durben	United States	397	379	393	1169	
15	Jorge González	Spain	399	379	390	1168	
15	Pavel Soukeník	Czechoslovakia	398	375	395	1168	
17	Juha Hirvi	Finland	397	384	386	1167	
18	Olaf Heß	East Germany	395	378	393	1166	
18	Stefan Lövbom	Sweden	399	376	391	1166	
18	Norbert Sturny	Switzerland	398	380	388	1166	
21	Pascal Bessy	France	395	381	389	1165	
21	Kwon Taek-yul	South Korea	397	381	387	1165	
21	Eduard Papirov	Israel	399	378	388	1165	
21	Srecko Pejovic	Yugoslavia	395	377	393	1165	
25	Jean-François Senecal	Canada	397	380	387	1164	
25	Xu Xiaoguang	China	397	378	389	1164	
27	Petar Zaprianov	Bulgaria	398	379	385	1162	
28	Ryohei Koba	Japan	398	381	382	1161	
28	Lee Eun-chul	South Korea	395	379	387	1161	
28	Ulrich Lind	West Germany	399	375	387	1161	
28	Georgi Poliakov	Bulgaria	396	375	390	1161	
32	Sándor Bereczky	Hungary	398	372	390	1160	
32	Petr Kůrka	Czechoslovakia	396	375	389	1160	
34	Kurt Thune	Finland	395	378	386	1159	
35	Pierre-Alain Dufaux	Switzerland	397	376	385	1158	
36	Lothar Heinrich	Austria	391	373	393	1157	
36	Mart Klepp	Canada	395	369	393	1157	
38	Johannes Gufler	Austria	392	375	388	1155	
38	Kurt Hillenbrand	West Germany	395	371	389	1155	
40	José Álvarez	Mexico	398	369	387	1154	
40	Donald Brook	Australia	397	372	385	1154	
42	Jørgen Herlufsen	Denmark	398	369	386	1153	
43	Itzchak Yonassi	Israel	395	374	383	1152	
44	Kaoru Matsuo	Japan	395	372	380	1147	
45	Per G. Hansson	Sweden	396	365	385	1146	
46	Alan Smith	Australia	397	373	373	1143	
47	Bruce Meredith	Virgin Islands	397	364	380	1141	

OR Olympic record – Q Qualified for final

== Final ==
Rank	Athlete	Qual	Final	Total	Notes
1st place, gold medalist(s)	Malcolm Cooper (GBR)	1180	99.3	1279.3	OR
2nd place, silver medalist(s)	Alister Allan (GBR)	1181	94.6	1275.6	
3rd place, bronze medalist(s)	Kirill Ivanov (URS)	1173	102.0	1275.0	
4	Klavs Jørn Christensen (DEN)	1177	96.6	1273.6	
5	Glenn Dubis (USA)	1174	99.5	1273.5	
6	Hrachya Petikyan (URS)	1173	99.2	1272.2	
7	Harald Stenvaag (NOR)	1173	98.7	1271.7	
8	Goran Maksimović (YUG)	1173	98.5	1271.5	

OR Olympic record

== Sources ==
- XXIVth Olympiad Seoul 1988 Official Report – Volume 2 Part 2 (PDF).
