= Swimming at the 1988 Summer Olympics – Men's 200 metre breaststroke =

Men's 200 metre breaststroke at the Games of the XXIV Olympiad
- Venue: Jamsil Indoor Swimming Pool
- Date: 23 September 1988 (heats & finals)
- Competitors: 54 from 40 nations
- Winning time: 2:13.52 EU

Medalists
1st place, gold medalist(s)		József Szabó	Hungary
2nd place, silver medalist(s)		Nick Gillingham	Great Britain
3rd place, bronze medalist(s)		Sergio López Miró	Spain

The men's 200 metre breaststroke event at the 1988 Summer Olympics took place on 23 September at the Jamsil Indoor Swimming Pool in Seoul, South Korea.

== Records ==
Prior to this competition, the existing world and Olympic records were as follows.

World record	Victor Davis (CAN)	2:13.34	Los Angeles, United States	2 August 1984
Olympic record	Victor Davis (CAN)	2:13.34	Los Angeles, United States	2 August 1984

== Results ==
=== Heats ===
Rule: The eight fastest swimmers advance to final A (Q), while the next eight to final B (q).

Rank	Heat	Name	Nationality	Time	Notes
1	6	Nick Gillingham	Great Britain	2:14.58	Q
2	6	József Szabó	Hungary	2:14.97	Q
3	7	Mike Barrowman	United States	2:15.85	Q
4	5	Valeriy Lozik	Soviet Union	2:16.31	Q
5	5	Jonathan Cleveland	Canada	2:16.87	Q
6	6	Sergio López Miró	Spain	2:17.06	Q
7	7	Péter Szabó	Hungary	2:17.10	Q
8	6	Vadim Alexeev	Soviet Union	2:17.15	Q
9	7	Cameron Grant	Canada	2:17.62	q
10	7	Shigehiro Takahashi	Japan	2:17.69	q
11	6	Alexandre Yokochi	Portugal	2:17.87	q
12	4	Sidney Appelboom	Belgium	2:18.02	q
12	5	Radek Beinhauer	Czechoslovakia	2:18.02	q
14	7	Alexander Marček	Czechoslovakia	2:18.44	q
15	7	Adrian Moorhouse	Great Britain	2:18.51	q, WD
16	5	Étienne Dagon	Switzerland	2:18.68	q
17	6	Cédric Penicaud	France	2:18.72	q
18	5	Gary O'Toole	Ireland	2:18.93	
19	5	Kirk Stackle	United States	2:19.47	
20	6	Pablo Restrepo	Colombia	2:19.58	
21	7	Ian McAdam	Australia	2:19.68	
22	4	Yoon Joo-il	South Korea	2:19.94	
23	3	Javier Careaga	Mexico	2:20.11	
24	6	Joaquín Fernández	Spain	2:20.34	
25	4	Ronald Dekker	Netherlands	2:20.84	
26	3	Pierre-Yves Eberle	Switzerland	2:20.65	
27	4	Christian Poswiat	East Germany	2:20.99	
28	4	Luc van de Vondel	Belgium	2:21.50	
29	4	Petri Suominen	Finland	2:22.01	
30	4	Hironobu Nagahata	Japan	2:22.23	
31	3	Mark Warnecke	West Germany	2:22.55	
31	5	Hartmut Wedekind	West Germany	2:22.55	
33	2	Tsai Hsin-yen	Chinese Taipei	2:23.80	
34	3	Thomas Böhm	Austria	2:24.15	
35	3	Chang Qing	China	2:24.45	
36	3	Richard Lockhart	New Zealand	2:24.52	
37	3	Eyal Stigman	Israel	2:25.18	
38	4	Jin Fu	China	2:26.05	
39	2	Wirmandi Sugriat	Indonesia	2:26.17	
40	2	Manuel Gutiérrez	Panama	2:26.57	
41	7	Jan-Erick Olsen	Norway	2:26.70	
42	1	Anthony Beks	New Zealand	2:27.26	
43	2	Arnþór Ragnarsson	Iceland	2:27.93	
44	2	Cícero Tortelli	Brazil	2:28.82	
45	2	Nikolaos Fokianos	Greece	2:28.91	
46	3	Patrick Concepcion	Philippines	2:29.62	
47	1	Ng Yue Meng	Singapore	2:30.74	
48	2	Watt Kam Sing	Hong Kong	2:30.78	
49	1	Kraig Singleton	Virgin Islands	2:36.45	
50	1	Quách Hoài Nam	Vietnam	2:39.69	
51	1	Amine El-Domyati	Lebanon	2:44.34	
52	1	Obaid Al-Rumaithi	United Arab Emirates	2:50.49	
	2	Christian Toft	Denmark	DSQ	
	5	David Leblanc	France	DSQ	

=== Finals ===
==== Final B ====
Rank	Lane	Name	Nationality	Time	Notes
9	3	Alexandre Yokochi	Portugal	2:18.01	
10	5	Shigehiro Takahashi	Japan	2:18.03	
11	2	Sidney Appelboom	Belgium	2:18.08	
12	6	Radek Beinhauer	Czechoslovakia	2:18.13	
13	1	Étienne Dagon	Switzerland	2:18.17	
14	4	Cameron Grant	Canada	2:18.36	
15	7	Alexander Marček	Czechoslovakia	2:18.51	
16	8	Cédric Penicaud	France	2:18.95	

==== Final A ====
Rank	Lane	Name	Nationality	Time	Notes
1st place, gold medalist(s)	5	József Szabó	Hungary	2:13.52	EU
2nd place, silver medalist(s)	4	Nick Gillingham	Great Britain	2:14.12	
3rd place, bronze medalist(s)	7	Sergio López Miró	Spain	2:15.21	NR
4	3	Mike Barrowman	United States	2:15.45	
5	6	Valeriy Lozik	Soviet Union	2:16.16	
6	8	Vadim Alexeev	Soviet Union	2:16.70	
7	2	Jonathan Cleveland	Canada	2:17.10	
8	1	Péter Szabó	Hungary	2:17.12	
