= Shooting at the 1988 Summer Olympics – Men's 50 metre rifle prone =

Sports shooting at the Olympics

Men's 50 metre rifle prone at the Games of the XXIV Olympiad
- Date: 19 September 1988
- Competitors: 55 from 33 nations
- Winning score: 703.9 (OR)

Medalists
1st place, gold medalist(s)		Miroslav Varga	Czechoslovakia
2nd place, silver medalist(s)		Cha Young-chul	South Korea
3rd place, bronze medalist(s)		Attila Záhonyi	Hungary

Men's 50 metre rifle prone (then known as small-bore free rifle) was one of the thirteen shooting events at the 1988 Summer Olympics. It was the first Olympic three positions competition to feature final shooting. Miroslav Varga equalled the world record with a perfect 600 in the qualification round, and retained half of his two-point pre-final lead until the end of the competition.

== Qualification round ==
Rank	Athlete	Country	Score	Notes
1	Miroslav Varga	Czechoslovakia	600	Q EWR OR
2	Cha Young-chul	South Korea	598	Q
3	Pavel Soukeník	Czechoslovakia	598	Q
4	Alister Allan	Great Britain	598	Q
5	Attila Záhonyi	Hungary	597	Q
6	Xu Xiaoguang	China	597	Q
7	Bernd Rücker	West Germany	597	Q
8	Michael Ashcroft	Canada	597	Q
9	Jan Gundersrud	Norway	596	
10	Stephen Petterson	New Zealand	596	
11	Per G. Hansson	Sweden	596	
11	Stefan Lövbom	Sweden	596	
11	Goran Maksimović	Yugoslavia	596	
11	Alan Smith	Australia	596	
15	Klavs Jørn Christensen	Denmark	595	
15	Glenn Dubis	United States	595	
15	Lothar Heinrich	Austria	595	
15	Olaf Hess	East Germany	595	
15	Kirill Ivanov	Soviet Union	595	
15	Jiang Rong	China	595	
15	Vladimir Lvov	Soviet Union	595	
15	Kaoru Matsuo	Japan	595	
15	Andreas Wolfram	East Germany	595	
24	Pierre-Alain Dufaux	Switzerland	594	
24	Juha Hirvi	Finland	594	
24	Kwak Jung-hoon	South Korea	594	
24	Eduard Papirov	Israel	594	
24	Norbert Sturny	Switzerland	594	
24	Kurt Thune	Finland	594	
24	Patrick Vamplew	Canada	594	
24	Webster Wright	United States	594	
32	Jean-Pierre Amat	France	593	
32	Pascal Bessy	France	593	
32	Jorge González	Spain	593	
32	Georgi Poliakov	Bulgaria	593	
36	Jorge Bracero	Puerto Rico	592	
36	Malcolm Cooper	Great Britain	592	
36	Jørgen Just Herlufsen	Denmark	592	
39	Adilbishiin Sangidorj	Mongolia	591	
39	José Álvarez	Mexico	591	
41	Donald Brook	Australia	590	
41	Kurt Hillenbrand	West Germany	590	
41	Julio César Iemma	Argentina	590	
41	Petar Zaprianov	Bulgaria	590	
45	Sandor Bereczky	Hungary	589	
45	Albert Deuring	Austria	589	
47	Srecko Pejovic	Yugoslavia	588	
47	Geir Skirbekk	Norway	588	
49	Daya Rajasinghe	Sri Lanka	587	
50	Bruce Meredith	Virgin Islands	586	
51	Ryohei Koba	Japan	584	
51	Itzchak Yonassi	Israel	584	
53	Roland Jacoby	Luxembourg	583	
54	Jadaan Tarjam Al-Shammari	Qatar	582	
55	Kenneth Johnston	Zimbabwe	580	

EWR Equalled world record – OR Olympic record – Q Qualified for final

== Final ==
Rank	Athlete	Qual	Final	Total	Notes
1st place, gold medalist(s)	Miroslav Varga (TCH)	600	103.9	703.9	OR
2nd place, silver medalist(s)	Cha Young-chul (KOR)	598	104.8	702.8	
3rd place, bronze medalist(s)	Attila Záhonyi (HUN)	597	104.9	701.9	
4	Pavel Soukeník (TCH)	598	103.2	701.2	
5	Alister Allan (GBR)	598	102.9	700.9	
6	Xu Xiaoguang (CHN)	597	103.6	700.6	
7	Bernd Rücker (FRG)	597	103.5	700.5	
8	Michael Ashcroft (CAN)	597	101.5	698.5	

OR Olympic record

== Sources ==
- XXIVth Olympiad Seoul 1988 Official Report – Volume 2 Part 2 (PDF).
