= Hua (surname) =

Hua is a common transliteration for some Chinese surnames, of which the most common ones are 華/华 (pinyin: Huà) and 花 (pinyin: Huā). The Cantonese romanizations for 華 and 花 are Wah and Fa, respectively. 華, when pronounced in the fourth tone in Mandarin, is exclusively used in the name of Mount Hua and as a surname. The usual pronunciation of 華 is huá, which literally means "prosper" and is used as a reference to the Chinese people. On the other hand, 花 literally means "flower".

== Huà (华 / 華) ==
It is listed 28th on the Song dynasty-era Hundred Family Surnames.

- Alex Hua Tian (华天; 華天; born 1989), Chinese equestrian sportsman
- Benjamin Wah (华云生; 華雲生), Chinese-American engineer and professor
- Hua Chenyu (华晨宇; 華晨宇; born 1990), Chinese singer and songwriter
- Hua Chunying (华春莹; 華春瑩; born 1970), Chinese diplomat
- Hua Dongdong (华东东; 華東東; born 1999), Chinese para swimmer, Paralympic silver medalist
- Hua Gang (华岗; 華崗; 1903–1972), Chinese educator
- Gang Hua (华刚; 華剛; born 1979), Chinese-American computer scientist
- Hua Guofeng (华国锋; 華國鋒; 1921–2008), Chinese politician
- Hua Jianmin (华建敏; 華建敏; born 1940), Chinese politician
- Hua Jiansheng (华建升; 華建升; born 1963), Chinese sports shooter
- Lefong Hua (born 1982), Canadian chess player
- Hua Luogeng (华罗庚; 華羅庚; 1910–1985), Chinese mathematician and politician
- Hua Runhao (华润豪; 華潤豪; born 1996), Chinese former tennis player
- Hua Sanchuan (华三川; 華三川; 1930–2004), Chinese painter and illustrator
- Hua Shaoqing (华绍青; 華紹青; born 1994), Chinese long-distance runner
- Hua Shifei (华士飞; 華士飛; born 1947), Chinese military officer and politician
- Hua Sui (华燧; 華燧; 1439–1513), Chinese scholar and printer
- Hua Tuo (华佗; 華佗; 140–208), Eastern Han Dynasty physician
- Hua Wenyi (华文漪; 華文漪; 1941–2022), Chinese Kunqu opera performer
- Hua Xin (华歆; 華歆; 157–232), Eastern Han Dynasty politician
- Hua Xiong (华雄; 華雄; died 191), Eastern Han Dynasty general under warlord Dong Zhuo
- Hua Xuanfei (华宣飞; 華宣飛; born 1971), Chinese news reporter
- Hua Yan (华嵒; 華嵒; 1682–1756), Qing Dynasty painter
- Hua Yanjun (华彦钧; 華彥鈞; 1893–1950), Chinese musician
- Hua Yi (华轶; 華軼; died 311), Jin Dynasty official

== Huā (花) ==
It is the 55th name on the Hundred Family Surnames poem.

- Hua Cheng (花城), fictional character in Heaven Official's Blessing.
- Hua Mulan (花木兰; 花木蘭), ancient Chinese legendary woman warrior.
  - According to History of Ming, her family name is Zhu (朱), while the History of Qing says it is Wei (魏).
- Hua Rong (花荣; 花榮), fictional character in Water Margin.
- Hua Qianfang (花千芳), writer, social commentator.
- Hua Xinyue (花新月), fictional character in the 1990s Novel Series All under Heaven.
