= Jenny Evans (disambiguation) =

Jenny Evans may refer to

- Jenny Evans (b. 1954), British–German jazz singer
- Jenny Evans (journalist), Welsh actress, journalist and producer
- Jenny Evans (née Jenny Reisener) (b. 1967), Australian basketball player
- Jenni L. Evans (1962–2025), Australian meteorologist
- Jennie Evans Moore Seymour (1872–1936) African-American religious leader
- Jennifer Evans (b. 1982), Welsh actress
- Jennifer V. Evans, Canadian professor of history
