= Bracero (surname) =

Bracero is a Spanish surname. Notable people with the surname include:

- Adolfo Bracero (1909–1978), Spanish footballer
- Jorge Bracero (born 1948), Puerto Rican sports shooter
- Olga L. Mayol-Bracero, Puerto Rican atmospheric chemist
- Rafael Bracero (born 1940), Puerto Rican sportscaster
