= Shooting at the 1984 Summer Olympics – Men's 10 metre air rifle =

Sports shooting at the Olympics

Men's 10 metre air rifle at the Games of the XXIII Olympiad
- Venue: Los Angeles, United States
- Date: August 3, 1984
- Competitors: 54 from 35 nations

Medalists
1st place, gold medalist(s)		Philippe Heberlé	France
2nd place, silver medalist(s)		Andreas Kronthaler	Austria
3rd place, bronze medalist(s)		Barry Dagger	Great Britain

The men's 10 metre air rifle was a shooting sports event held as part of the Shooting at the 1984 Summer Olympics programme. It was the first time the event was held at the Olympics. The competition was held on August 3, 1984 at the shooting ranges in Los Angeles. 54 shooters from 35 nations competed.

== Results ==
Place	Shooter	Total	Shoot-off
1	Philippe Heberlé (FRA)	589	
2	Andreas Kronthaler (AUT)	587	36
3	Barry Dagger (GBR)	587	22
4	Nicolas Berthelot (FRA)	585	
5	Peter Heinz (FRG)	583	
6	John Rost (USA)	583	
7	Harald Stenvaag (NOR)	582	
8	Yitzhak Yonassi (ISR)	582	
9	Ignatios Psyllakis (GRE)	581	
10	Bernhard Süß (FRG)	581	
11	Guy Lorion (CAN)	581	
12T	Frank Arens (BEL)	580	
12T	Rajmond Debevec (YUG)	580	
12T	Ove Sjögren (SWE)	580	
15T	Malcolm Cooper (GBR)	579	
15T	Glenn Dubis (USA)	579	
15T	Šaćir Džeko (YUG)	579	
18T	Ryohei Koba (JPN)	578	
18T	Mauri Röppänen (FIN)	578	
20T	Niels Peder Pedersen (DEN)	577	
20T	Ricardo Rusticucci (ARG)	577	
20T	Constantin Stan (ROU)	577	
23T	Bob Cheyne (CAN)	576	
23T	Hansüli Minder (SUI)	576	
25	Per Erik Løkken (NOR)	575	
26T	Christian Heller (SWE)	574	
26T	José María Pigrau (ESP)	574	
28T	Gerhard Krimbacher (AUT)	573	
28T	Park Dae-un (KOR)	573	
30T	Jorge González (ESP)	572	
30T	Xu Xiaoguang (CHN)	572	
32	Pelopidas Iliadis (GRE)	571	
33T	Pierre-Alain Dufaux (SUI)	570	
33T	Herbert Memelink (NED)	570	
35	Justo Moreno (PER)	567	
36T	José Álvarez (MEX)	565	
36T	Hua Jiansheng (CHN)	565	
38	Yoon Deok-ha (KOR)	563	
39T	Bhagirath Samai (IND)	562	
39T	Kamal El-Din Shemais (EGY)	562	
41	Hugo Romero (ECU)	561	
42	German Carrasquilla (COL)	560	
43T	Abdul Latif Al-Bulushi (OMA)	558	
43T	Manop Leeprasansakul (THA)	558	
45	Paulo Pimenta (BRA)	557	
46	Víctor Garcés (MEX)	556	
47	Tanin Thaisinlp (THA)	554	
48	Khamis Al-Subhi (OMA)	552	
49	Dennis Hardman (ZIM)	548	
50	Khuwaled Al-Harthi (KSA)	545	
51	Pasquale Raschi (SMR)	543	
52	Roger Cartín (CRC)	511	
AC	Yair Davidovitz (ISR)		
AC	Kaoru Matsuo (JPN)		
