= Tania López Marrero =

Puerto Rican scientist

- Education: UPRRP College of Natural Sciences (B.Sc.); Penn State College of Earth and Mineral Sciences (M.Sc., Ph.D.)
- Awards: Sloan Research Fellowship (2005)
- Scientific career
- Fields: Geography, cartography, ecosystems, natural hazards
- Workplaces: Rutgers University; UPRM College of Arts and Sciences
- Thesis: Adaptive capacity and resilience to floods in the Caribbean: A case study of two flood-prone communities in Puerto Rico (2008)
- Doctoral advisor: Brent Yarnal; Petra Tschakert

Tania del Mar López Marrero is a Puerto Rican scientist. She is an associate professor in the department of social sciences at the University of Puerto Rico at Mayagüez.

== Education ==
In 1997, López completed a B.Sc. in environmental science at the College of Natural Sciences at University of Puerto Rico, Río Piedras Campus (UPR-RP). Her undergraduate thesis was titled The Effect of Land Use on Soil Erosion in the Guadiana Watershed in Puerto Rico. She was a laboratory technician at UPR-RP in 1997. In 1998, she was a GIS intern at La Selva Biological Station. From 1998 to 2000, López was a GIS and Cartographic technician at the International Institute of Tropical Forestry where she later became a GIS analyst in 2001. In 2002, she earned a M.Sc. in geography with a focus on human-environment relationships at Penn State College of Earth and Mineral Sciences (PSU). Her master's thesis was titled Characterization and Modeling of Land-Cover Change: The Case of Urban Expansion in a Caribbean Landscape. From 2002 to 2004, López was an instructor in the department of geography at UPR-RP. In 2008, López completed a Ph.D. in geography with an emphasis on human-environment relationships and cartography from PSU. Her dissertation was titled Adaptive Capacity and Resilience to Floods in the Caribbean: A Case Study from Flood-Prone Communities in Puerto Rico. Her advisors were Brent Yarnal and Petra Tschakert.

== Career ==
From 2008 to 2010, López was an assistant researcher at the Institute of Caribbean Studies at UPR-RP. In 2010, she joined the departments of geography and Latino and Hispanic Caribbean studies at Rutgers University as a visiting researcher before working as an assistant professor from 2011 to 2014. In 2014, López became an assistant professor in the department of social sciences and director of the interdisciplinary center for coastal studies at the UPRM College of Arts and Sciences. From 2015 to 2016, López was the associate director of the National Sea Grant College Program at UPRM. In 2018, she became an associate professor at UPRM. In 2022, she transitioned from associate professor to professor at UPRM. Here, she teaches many Sociology related classes such as Environmental Sociology and Sociology of Disasters, as well as some Geology classes.

=== Research ===
López researches natural hazards and disasters, ecosystem change and services, land use, mixed methods, techniques in participatory research, geographic information systems, and cartography. She also researches human-environment interactions, natural adaptive capacity, and community resilience. She is the principal investigator (PI) for a number of projects. From 2008 to 2010, López was the PI for the project, Integrating Landscape Attributes, Ecosystem Services, and Stakeholder Perceptions and Incentives for Determining Land Use Suitability for Conservation in collaboration with University of Puerto Rico and the International Institute of Tropical Forestry. From 2009 to 2011, López was the PI for the project, Public Knowledge and Perception of Forest Ecosystems Services and Drivers of Ecosystem Change: the Case of the Northern Karst and the Río Piedras Watershed, Puerto Rico which was conducted in collaboration with UPR, USDA, and United States Forest Service Urban and Community Forestry, and Misión Industrial de Puerto Rico. In 2012, she received a Rutgers Council grant for the project, Re-mapping the Insular Caribbean: Visualizing and interpreting environmental data through cartograms. Through the Critical Caribbean Studies initiative at Rutgers University, López researched the urban expansion and natural hazards in Puerto Rico from 2012 to 2013. In 2013, she led the Rutgers University Caribbean Environmental Mapping Initiative. López was the project director of the Promoting Community Adaptation and Resilience in the Insular Caribbean (PROCARIB Working Group) at Rutgers University from 2012 to 2014.

== Awards and honors ==
In 2005, López won a Sloan Research Fellowship for underrepresented minority students earning doctorates in mathematics, science, and engineering.

== Selected works ==
=== Books ===
- López Marrero, Tania del Mar; Villanueva Colón, Nancy (2006). Atlas ambiental de Puerto Rico. La Editorial Universidad de Puerto Rico. ISBN 084772509X.
- López Marrero, Tania del Mar; Arocho Barreto, Amarilys (2018). Un cambio categoría 4: memorias del huracán María. I. Cámara-Torres, N. Castillo-Rivera, A. Castro-Rivera, H.B. Colón-Rodríguez, I.A. Escalera-García, M. Echevarría-Ramos, G. Franqui-Lugo, J.D. García-Santiago, N. Graniela-Marty, M.A. Lorenzo-Pérez, L. Martínez-Guzmán, C.F. Rivera-López, E.A. Ríos-Santiago, G.E. Sellas-Ramírez. Centro Interdisciplinario de Estudios del Litoral. ISBN 9781881719755.
