= Tennessee Tech Golden Eagles =

- University: Tennessee Tech University
- Nickname: Golden Eagles
- NCAA: Division I (FCS)
- Conference: SoCon
- Athletic director: Casey Fox
- Location: Cookeville, Tennessee
- Varsity teams: 6 men's & 7 women's
- Football stadium: Tucker Stadium
- Basketball arena: Eblen Center
- Baseball stadium: Bush Stadium at Averitt Express Baseball Complex
- Softball stadium: Tech Softball Field
- Colors: Purple and gold
- Mascot: Awesome Eagle
- Fight song: The Tennessee Tech Fight Song
- Website: www.ttusports.com/landing/index
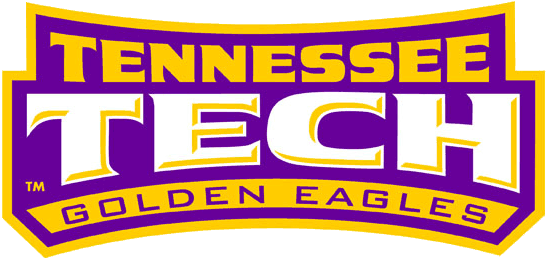

The Tennessee Tech Golden Eagles are the intercollegiate athletic teams of Tennessee Tech University (TTU), located in Cookeville, Tennessee, United States. The TTU athletic program is a member of the Southern Conference (SoCon) and competes in NCAA Division I, including the Football Championship Subdivision. Tech left the Ohio Valley Conference (OVC) for the Southern Conference (SoCon) after the 2025–26 school year. The SoCon sponsors all of Tech's sports except beach volleyball; the Golden Eagles' are an affiliate member in the OVC for that sport.

The Tech mascot is Awesome Eagle, and the school colors are purple and gold.

== Sports sponsored ==
A member of the Ohio Valley Conference from 1949 through 2025–26 before joining the Southern Conference, Tennessee Tech sponsors teams in six men's and seven women's NCAA sanctioned sports: Men's tennis competed in the Horizon League after the OVC merged its men's tennis league into that of the Horizon after the 2021–22 season. The only Tech sport that will not compete in the SoCon after 2025–26 is beach volleyball, which that conference does not sponsor.

Men's sports	Women's sports
Baseball	Softball
Basketball	Basketball
Cross country	Cross country
Golf	Golf
Football	Soccer
Tennis	Track and field^{1}
	Volleyball
^{1} – includes both indoor and outdoor.

== Athletic facilities ==
Venue	Sport(s) hosted
Bush Stadium	Baseball
Eblen Center	Basketball
Tucker Stadium	Football, track and field
Tech Soccer Field	Soccer
Tech Softball Field	Softball
Tech Tennis Courts	Tennis
Eblen Center	Volleyball

== National championships ==
=== Team ===
Association	Division	Sport	Year	Opponent/ runner-up	Score
NCAA	Division I	Rifle (3)	1980	West Virginia	6,201–6,150
NCAA	Division I	Rifle (3)	1981	West Virginia	6,139–6,136
NCAA	Division I	Rifle (3)	1982	West Virginia	6,138–6,136

=== Individual ===
Association	Division	Sport	Year	Event	Individual(s)	Score
NCAA	Division I	Rifle (5)	1980	Smallbore rifle	Rod Fitz-Randolph	1,176
NCAA	Division I	Rifle (5)	1980	Air rifle	Rod Fitz-Randolph	389
NCAA	Division I	Rifle (5)	1981	Smallbore rifle	Kurt Fitz-Randolph	1,173
NCAA	Division I	Rifle (5)	1982	Smallbore rifle	Kurt Fitz-Randolph	1,167
NCAA	Division I	Rifle (5)	1983	Air rifle	Ray Slonena	389
