= Chu Hui =

Chu Hui is the name of:

- Chu Hui (basketball) (born 1969), Chinese female basketball player
- Chu Hui (volleyball) (born 1981), Chinese male volleyball player
