= Byrsonima wadsworthii =

Scientific classification
- Kingdom: Plantae
- Clade: Tracheophytes
- Clade: Angiosperms
- Clade: Eudicots
- Clade: Rosids
- Order: Malpighiales
- Family: Malpighiaceae
- Genus: Byrsonima
- Species: B. wadsworthii

Binomial name
- Byrsonima wadsworthii Little

Species of plant

Byrsonima wadsworthii (almendrillo in Spanish) is a rare plant known only to the Luquillo Mountains and the Cordillera Central in Northeastern Puerto Rico. First described by botanist Elbert Luther Little, the plant was named in 1953 in honor of Dr. Frank H. Wadsworth, former supervisor of the Caribbean National Forest (now known as El Yunque National Forest) and first director of the International Institute of Tropical Forestry. The first recorded botanical collection was by Claud L. Horn of the Forest Service in 1934.
