= Kirill Ivanov =

Kirill Ivanov may refer to:

- Kirill Ivanov (gymnast), Russian gymnast who participated in the 2009 Trampoline World Championships
- Kirill Ivanov (sport shooter) (born 1960), Soviet Olympic sport shooter
- Kirill Ivanov-Smolensky (born 1981), Russian tennis player
