= Andreas Kronthaler =

Andreas Kronthaler may refer to:

- Andreas Kronthaler (sport shooter)
- Andreas Kronthaler (fashion designer)
