= 1981 NCAA Rifle Championships =

Second annual collegiate shooting tournament

1981 NCAA Rifle Championship
Tournament information
- Sport: Collegiate rifle shooting
- Location: (New York (state)) West Point, NY
- Host(s): United States Military Academy
- Participants: 10

Final positions
- Champions: Tennessee Tech (2nd title)
- 1st runners-up: West Virginia
- 2nd runners-up: East Tennessee State

Tournament statistics
- Smallbore: Kurt Fitz-Randolph, TTU
- Air rifle: John Rost, WVU

The 1981 NCAA Rifle Championship was the second annual tournament to determine the national champion of NCAA co-ed collegiate rifle shooting. The championship was held at the U.S. Military Academy in West Point, New York during March 1981.

Tennessee Tech, with a team score of 6,139, retained the national title, their second. West Virginia again finished in second, with 6,136. The Golden Eagles were coached by James Newkirk.

Kurt Fitz-Randolph (Tennessee Tech) claimed the individual titles for smallbore, and John Rost (West Virginia) won the championship for air rifle.

== Qualification ==
Since there is only one national collegiate championship for rifle shooting, all NCAA rifle programs (whether from Division I, Division II, or Division III) were eligible. A total of 10 teams ultimately contested this championship.

Team	Appearance	Previous
Air Force	2nd	1980
Army	2nd	1980
Eastern Kentucky	2nd	1980
East Tennessee State	2nd	1980
Navy	2nd	1980
Murray State	2nd	1980
Penn State	1st	Never
St. John's (NY)	1st	Never
Tennessee Tech	2nd	1980
West Virginia	2nd	1980

== Results ==
- Scoring: The championship consisted of 120 shots by each competitor in smallbore and 40 shots per competitor in air rifle.

=== Team title ===
Rank	Team	Points
1st place, gold medalist(s)	Tennessee Tech	6,139
2nd place, silver medalist(s)	West Virginia	6,136
3rd place, bronze medalist(s)	East Tennessee State	6,121
4	Eastern Kentucky	6,104
5	Murray State	6,072
6	Army	6,060
7	Navy	6,016
8	St. John's (NY)	5,960
9	Penn State	5,896
10	Air Force	5,817

=== Individual events ===
Event	Winner	Score
Smallbore	Kurt Fitz-Randolph, Tennessee Tech	1,173
Air rifle	John Rost, West Virginia	391
