= Yitzhak Yonassi =

Israeli sports shooter

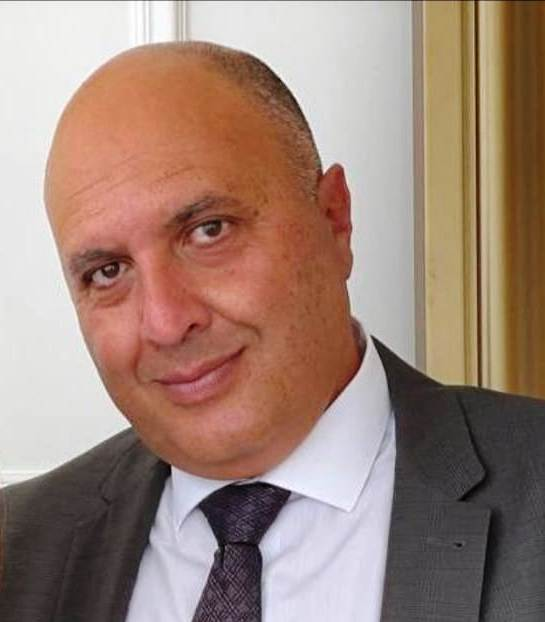

Personal information
- Native name: יצחק יונסי
- National team: Israel
- Born: October 18, 1962 (age 63) Ashkelon, Israel
- Occupations: President, Israel Shooting Federation
- Height: 5 ft 9 in (175 cm)
- Weight: 172 lb (78 kg)

Sport
- Sport: Sport shooting
- Events: Men's Air Rifle, 10 metres; Men's Small-Bore Rifle, Three Positions, 50 metres; Men's Small-Bore Rifle, Prone, 50 metres
- Coached by: Shlomo Goldstein and Yair-Henrik Dawidowich

Yitzhak Yonassi (also "Itzhak" and "Itzchak"; Hebrew: יצחק יונסי; born October 18, 1962) is an Israeli former Olympic sport shooter.

He was born in Ashkelon, Israel, and is Jewish.

== Shooting career ==
He won at least one of the three shooting categories in the Israeli shooting championship every year from 1977 through 1991.

When he competed in the Olympics, he was 5 feet 9 inches (175 cm) tall, and weighed 172 pounds (78 kg). His coaches were Shlomo Goldstein and Yair-Henrik Dawidowich.

He competed for Israel at the 1984 Summer Olympics in Los Angeles, at the age of 21, in Shooting--Men's Air Rifle, 10 metres, and came in 8th (his 582 score was 5 points behind the bronze medalist, and established a new Israeli national record by 10 points), in Men's Small-Bore Rifle, Three Positions, 50 metres, and came in tied for 39th, and in Men's Small-Bore Rifle, Prone, 50 metres, and came in tied for 49th. He competed alongside his teacher, Yair Davidovitz.

He competed for Israel at the 1988 Summer Olympics in Seoul, at the age of 25, in Shooting--Men's Air Rifle, 10 metres, and came in tied for 29th, in Men's Small-Bore Rifle, Three Positions, 50 metres, and came in 43rd, and in Men's Small-Bore Rifle, Prone, 50 metres, and came in tied for 51st.

He is the President of the Israel Shooting Federation.
