= Péter Szabó (swimmer) =

Hungarian swimmer

Personal information
- Born: 17 May 1968 (age 58) Kaposvár, Hungary

Sport
- Sport: Swimming

Péter Szabó (born 17 May 1968) is a Hungarian swimmer. He competed in the men's 200 metre breaststroke at the 1988 Summer Olympics.
