= Olga L. Mayol-Bracero =

Puerto Rican chemist

- Education: University of Puerto Rico, Río Piedras Campus (B.Sc., M.Sc., Ph.D.)
- Scientific career
- Fields: Atmospheric chemistry
- Workplaces: UPRRP College of Natural Sciences
- Thesis: Chemical and physical characterization of submicron organic aerosols in the tropical trade winds in the Caribbean (1998)

Olga L. Mayol-Bracero is a Puerto Rican atmospheric scientist at the Brookhaven National Laboratory. She is also the DOE ARM Lead Mentor of the Aerosol Observing Systems. She is a former associate professor at the UPRRP College of Natural Sciences. Her primary research focus is atmospheric aerosols. She researches the temporal and spatial variability of atmospheric aerosols; chemical, physical, and optical properties of atmospheric aerosols (African dust, biomass burning, marine, urban, biogenic) with particular interest in tropical regions; size-resolved aerosols composition and sources; carbonaceous aerosols (organic and black carbon); aerosols-clouds-precipitation interactions; air quality; the impact of atmospheric aerosols on degradation of structures.

== Education ==
Mayol-Bracero completed a B.Sc. (1989) and M.Sc. (1994) in chemistry at University of Puerto Rico, Río Piedras Campus (UPRRP). Her master's thesis was titled Evaluation of a Continuous Composite Sampler for Volatile Organic Compounds in Water. She earned a Ph.D. in chemistry at UPRRP and Lawrence Berkeley National Laboratory in 1998. Her dissertation was titled Chemical and physical characterization of submicron organic aerosols in the tropical trade winds in the Caribbean. She was a postdoctoral fellow at Max Planck Institute for Chemistry from 1998 to 2001.
