= Julio César Iemma =

Argentine sports shooter

Personal information
- Nationality: Argentine
- Born: 3 July 1954 (age 70)

Sport
- Sport: Sports shooting

Julio César Iemma (born 3 July 1954) is an Argentine sports shooter. He competed in the men's 50 metre rifle prone event at the 1988 Summer Olympics.
