= Ariel Lugo =

Puerto Rican scientist

Ariel E. Lugo
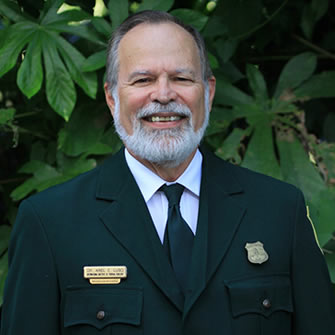
- Born: Mayagüez, Puerto Rico
- Education: University of Puerto Rico (BS, MS); University of North Carolina at Chapel Hill (Ph.D.)
- Scientific career
- Fields: Forestry, ecology
- Workplaces: International Institute of Tropical Forestry, US Forest Service

Ariel E. Lugo is a scientist, ecologist and former Director of the International Institute of Tropical Forestry (IITF) within the USDA United States Forest Service, based in Puerto Rico. He is a founding member of the Society for Ecological Restoration and Member-at-Large of the Board of the Ecological Society of America.

== Education ==
A native of Mayagüez, Puerto Rico, Lugo earned bachelor's and master's degrees in biology, both from the University of Puerto Rico. He later earned a Ph.D. in ecology from the University of North Carolina at Chapel Hill.

== Scientific and professional experience ==
In 1974, Lugo joined the Puerto Rico Department of Natural Resources as Assistant Secretary for Planning and Resource Analysis after completing post-doctoral research studies on wet forests in El Verde, Puerto Rico and mangroves in Florida. He has worked on a wide range of tropical and sub-tropical ecosystems: hardwood forests, mangroves, floodplain wetlands, sand pine forests, prairie lakes and palm wetlands. His current research focuses on the role of tropical forests in global processes, and on comparisons between tropical tree plantations and natural forests.

Before joining the Department of Natural Resources, Lugo served in a variety of leadership positions. He was the Acting Deputy Chief of International Forestry. He also served as the Acting Director of IITF and as Assistant Secretary for Science and Technology in the Puerto Rico Department of Natural Resources. One of his first positions of leadership was as Assistant Secretary for Planning and Resource Analysis (1973-1974). Additionally, Lugo was a notable contributor Intergovernmental Panel on Climate Change Scientific Assessment that would share a Nobel Peace Prize with Al Gore in 2007.

== Environmental issues ==
Lugo has over 300 publications in scientific journals and books, has served on federal interagency committees, and is frequently required to appear as an expert witness in federal court cases involving environmental issues.

He currently serves on the editorial boards of Conservation Ecology, Mitigation and Adaptation Strategies for Global Change, Forest Ecology and Management, Restoration Ecology, Journal of Sustainable Forestry, Acta Cientifica (as Editor), and Journal of the Litoral.

== Works ==
Among the written works in which Lugo is either the author or co-author are the following:

- "Natural Sinks of Co2: Palmas Del Mar, Puerto Rico"; Ariel E. Lugo and Joe Wisniewski
- "Big-Leaf Mahogany: Genetics, Ecology and Management (Ecological Studies)"; by Ariel E. Lugo, Julio C. Figueroa Colón and Mildred Alayón
- "Tropical Forests: Management and Ecology (Ecological Studies); by Ariel E. Lugo and Carol Lowe
- "Los sistemas ecologicos y la humanidad (Serie de biologia) (Spanish Edition)"; by Ariel E. Lugo
- "Ecological Development in the Humid Tropics: Guidelines for Planners," by Ariel E. Lugo, John R. Clark and R. Dennis Child
- "LOS BOSQUES DE PUERTO RICO (TEXT IN SPANISH AND ENGLISH - INSTITUTO DE DASONOMIA TROPICAL APARTADO AQ - SERVICIO FORESTAL DE LOS ESTADOS UNIDOS, DEPARTAMENTO DE RECURSOS NATURALES)"; by ARIEL E LUGO
- "Institute of tropical forestry: the first fifty years (SuDoc A 13.88:IITF-GTR-7)"; by Ariel E. Lugo
- "Readings on Ecological Systems: Their Function and Relation to Man"; by Ariel E. Lugo
- "People and the Tropical Forest; A Research Report from the United States Man and the Biosphere Program"; by Ariel E. Lugo and John J. Ewel
- "Los Bosques de Puerto Rico (Departemento de Recursos Naturales; Puerta de Tierra, Puerto Rico"; by Ariel E. Lugo

== Awards ==
- Zayed International Prize for the Environment
- Distinguished Service and Distinguished Scientist Award from USDA
- Honorary Doctorate from the University of Puerto Rico
- Meritorious Executive Rank Award by President George W. Bush
- Environmental Quality Award by the U.S Environmental Protection Agency

== See also ==
- List of Puerto Ricans
- Puerto Rican scientists and inventors
