= Andreas Wolfram =

East German sport shooter

Andreas Wolfram (27 February 1957 – 12 April 2012) was a German sport shooter. He was born in Leipzig. He competed at the 1988 Summer Olympics in the men's 50 metre rifle three positions event, in which he placed tenth; the men's 50 metre rifle prone event, in which he tied for 15th place; and the men's 10 metre air rifle event, in which he placed eighth.
