= John Rost (sport shooter) =

American sports shooter

Personal information
- Born: April 19, 1964 (age 62) Cincinnati, Ohio, United States

Sport
- Sport: Sports shooting

John Rost (born April 19, 1964) is an American sports shooter. He competed in the men's 10 metre air rifle event at the 1984 Summer Olympics.
