= Niels Peder Pedersen =

Danish sports shooter (born 1954)

Personal information
- Nationality: Danish
- Born: 15 January 1954 (age 71); Syddanmark, Denmark

Sport
- Sport: Sports shooting

Niels Peder Pedersen (born 15 January 1954) is a Danish sports shooter. He competed in the men's 10 metre air rifle event at the 1984 Summer Olympics.
