= Eduard Papirov =

Israeli sports shooter (born 1964)

Eddy Papirov
Personal information
- Native name: אדי פפירוב
- Nationality: Israeli
- Born: Eduard (Eddy) Papirov; March 3, 1964 (age 62) USSR
- Height: 5 ft 7.5 in (171.5 cm)

Sport
- Country: Israel
- Sport: Sport shooting
- Events: Men's Small-Bore Rifle, Prone, 50 metres; Men's Small-Bore Rifle, Three Positions, 50 metres; Men's 10 metre air rifle
- Coached by: Yair Davidovich

Eduard Papirov (Hebrew: אדי פפירוב; born March 3, 1964) is an Israeli former Olympic sport shooter.

He was born in the USSR, and is Jewish, immigrating with his parents to Israel at age 13 in 1977. When he competed in the Olympics he was 5 ft 7.5 in (171.5 cm) tall, and weighed 161 lb (73 kg).

== Shooting career ==
He competed for Israel at the 1988 Summer Olympics in Seoul at the age of 24. He competed in Shooting--Men's Small-Bore Rifle, Three Positions, 50 metres, and came in tied for 21st. He competed as well in Shooting--Men's Small-Bore Rifle, Prone, 50 metres, and came in tied for 24th. He competed also in Shooting--Men's Air Rifle, 10 metres, and came in tied for 34th.

At the European Shooting Championships, he finished 38th in the 50-meter free rifle event, with 590 points, in the '80s and '90s was more than 15 times Israeli champion in 60 shots prone and 3×40 (tree positions) Olympic events.

== Post olympic career ==
Until 1997, he was a schoolteacher for electronics and computer science. From 1997 to 2010, he worked as R&D engineer and manager for medical devices company Medispec ltd, specializing in shock waves medical technologies. Following this, he invented and patented new acoustic pulses technology for medical and veterinary uses, with large treatment zones applications. Today, he is the CEO of Hi-Impacts ltd - patent holdings and CTO (founder) of Armenta ltd company for bovine and other mammals' inflammations treatments, with improvements in animal wellness.
