= Johann Riederer =

German sports shooter (born 1957)

Personal information
- Born: 30 December 1957 (age 68) Unterföhring, Bavaria, West Germany
Medal record
Men's shooting
Representing Germany
Olympic Games
Bronze medal – third place	1988 Seoul	10 m air rifle
Bronze medal – third place	1992 Barcelona	10 m air rifle

Johann "Hans" Riederer (born 30 December 1957) is a German sports shooter and Olympic medalist. He won bronze medal in the 10 metre air rifle at the 1988 Summer Olympics in Seoul, and at the 1992 Summer Olympics in Barcelona. Riederer was born in Unterföhring, Bavaria.
