= Hanspeter Ziörjen =

Swiss sports shooter

Personal information
- Nationality: Swiss
- Born: 7 January 1958 (age 67)

Sport
- Sport: Sports shooting

Hanspeter Ziörjen (born 7 January 1958) is a Swiss sports shooter. He competed in the men's 10 metre air rifle event at the 1988 Summer Olympics.
