= 1980 NCAA Rifle Championships =

First annual collegiate shooting tournament

1980 NCAA Rifle Championship
Tournament information
- Sport: Collegiate rifle shooting
- Location: (Tennessee) Johnson City, TN
- Host(s): East Tennessee State University
- Venue(s): ETSU Athletic Center
- Participants: 10

Final positions
- Champions: Tennessee Tech (1st title)
- 1st runners-up: West Virginia
- 2nd runners-up: East Tennessee State

Tournament statistics
- Smallbore: Rod Fitz-Randolph, TTU
- Air rifle: Rod Fitz-Randolph, TTU

The 1980 NCAA Rifle Championship was the first annual tournament to determine the national champion of co-ed NCAA collegiate rifle shooting. The championship was held at the ETSU Athletic Center at East Tennessee State University in Johnson City, Tennessee during March 1980. Prior to 1980, a collegiate rifle championship was held yearly by the National Rifle Association.

Tennessee Tech, with a team score of 6,201, claimed their first national title. West Virginia finished in second with 6,150. The Golden Eagles were coached by James Newkirk.

Rod Fitz-Randolph, from Tennessee Tech, claimed the individual titles for both smallbore and air rifle.

== Qualification ==
Since there is only one national collegiate championship for rifle shooting, all NCAA rifle programs (whether from Division I, Division II, or Division III) were eligible. A total of 10 teams ultimately contested this championship.

Team	Appearance	Previous
Air Force	1st	Never
Alaska–Fairbanks	1st	Never
Army	1st	Never
Eastern Kentucky	1st	Never
East Tennessee State	1st	Never
Navy	1st	Never
Murray State	1st	Never
Tennessee Tech	1st	Never
West Virginia	1st	Never
Western Kentucky	1st	Never

== Results ==
- Scoring: The championship consisted of 120 shots by each competitor in smallbore and 40 shots per competitor in air rifle.

=== Team title ===
Rank	Team	Points
1st place, gold medalist(s)	Tennessee Tech	6,201
2nd place, silver medalist(s)	West Virginia	6,150
3rd place, bronze medalist(s)	East Tennessee State	6,118
4	Murray State	6,097
5	Eastern Kentucky	5,959
6	Navy	5,957
7	Army; Western Kentucky	5,901
8	Alaska–Fairbanks	5,878
9	Air Force	5,797

=== Individual events ===
Event	Winner	Score
Smallbore	Rod Fitz-Randolph, Tennessee Tech	1,176
Air rifle	Rod Fitz-Randolph, Tennessee Tech	389
