= Pavel Soukeník =

Czech sport shooter

Pavel Soukeník (15 November 1962 in Nivnice – 17 December 1988 in Bučovice) was a Czech sport shooter. He competed for Czechoslovakia at the 1988 Summer Olympics in the men's 50 metre rifle three positions event, in which he tied for 15th place; the men's 50 metre rifle prone event, in which he placed fourth; and the men's 10 metre air rifle event, in which he tied for 17th place.

He died at the age of 26 in a car accident.
