= Whit Babcock =

US college athletic director

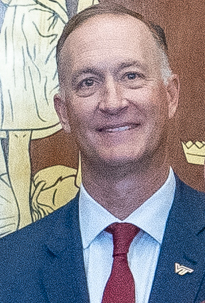
- Babcock in 2024

Biographical details
- Born: June 17, 1970 (age 56); Harrisonburg, Virginia, U.S.
- Education: James Madison University (B.S.); West Virginia University (M.S.)

Administrative career (AD unless noted)
- 2003–2007: West Virginia (Assistant AD)
- 2007–2011: Missouri (Associate AD)
- 2011–2014: Cincinnati
- 2014–present: Virginia Tech

Accomplishments and honors

Awards
- Under Armour AD of the Year (2017-18)

Whit Babcock (born June 17, 1970) is the current athletics director at Virginia Tech, a position he has held since 2014. Previously, he was the athletics director at the University of Cincinnati from 2011 to 2014. He previously served in the athletics departments of the University of Missouri, West Virginia University, Auburn University, and James Madison University.

== Early life and education ==
Babcock is from Harrisonburg, Virginia, where he attended Harrisonburg High School. He graduated from James Madison University in 1992 where he earned a Bachelor's degree. He graduated from West Virginia University in 1996 with a Master's degree in sports management.

== Career ==
=== University of Missouri ===
Babcock served as the executive associate athletic director where he oversaw all external relations and development operations. He also served as the administrator for the men's basketball program.

=== University of Cincinnati ===
At Cincinnati, Babcock made many coaching hires, including the hiring of Tommy Tuberville as the head football coach. He also planned a major $86 million renovation to Nippert Stadium that was completed in 2015. In addition, he opened the Sheakley Athletics Center and launched a scholarship enhancement plan for Olympic sports.

=== Virginia Tech ===
Babcock was announced as Virginia Tech's athletics director on January 24, 2014. During his tenure, he has made many successful coaching hires across various sports, including Buzz Williams, John Szefc, Kenny Brooks, Mike Young, Tony Robie, John Sung, and Sergio López Miró.

In 2016, he revamped the Hokie Club, Virginia Tech Athletic's fundraising program, and implemented the "Drive for 25," with Frank Beamer as its spokesperson, to increase membership of the Hokie Club to 25,000 members.

He has also overseen the new construction and renovations of many of Virginia Tech's athletic facilities. In 2018, Virginia Tech finished an $18 million renovation of English Field at Atlantic Union Bank Park. He also oversaw the renovation and expansion of Rector Field House, which added softball and expanded the track and field capabilities of the facility. Under his leadership, Virginia Tech is currently constructing a new $16.2 million Student-Athlete Performance Center, which will provide expanded nutrition, donor-engagement, and recruitment activities for Virginia Tech Athletics.

On April 23, 2026, he announced his retirement, effective on June 30, 2026. He will remain at Virginia Tech as an athletic director emeritus until June 2029.
