= Bernhard Süß =

German sports shooter

Personal information
- Nationality: German
- Born: 13 January 1961 (age 64); Penzberg, West Germany

Sport
- Sport: Sports shooting

Bernhard Süß (born 13 January 1961) is a German sports shooter. He competed in the men's 10 metre air rifle event at the 1984 Summer Olympics.
