= Klavs Jørn Christensen =

Danish sports shooter (born 1961)

Klavs Jørn Christensen (born 24 September 1961 in Aarhus) is a Danish sport shooter. He competed in rifle shooting events at the Summer Olympics in 1988 and 1992. He is currently coaching in Singapore as the Rifle Team coach.

== Olympic results ==
| Event | 1988 | 1992 |
|---|---|---|
| 50 metre rifle three positions (men) | 4th | 25th |
| 50 metre rifle prone (men) | T-15th | — |
| 10 metre air rifle (men) | 28th | — |
