= Michael Ashcroft (sport shooter) =

Canadian sport shooter (born 1964)

Michael Ashcroft (born December 7, 1964, in Leeds) is a Canadian sport shooter. He competed at the Summer Olympics in 1988 and 1992. In 1988, he placed eighth in the men's 50 metre rifle prone event, and in 1992, he tied for 15th place in the men's 50 metre rifle prone event.
