= Anders Burvall =

Swedish sports shooter

Personal information
- Nationality: Swedish
- Born: 25 October 1964 (age 60); Uppsala, Sweden

Sport
- Sport: Sports shooting

Anders Burvall (born 25 October 1964) is a Swedish sports shooter. He competed in the men's 10 metre air rifle event at the 1988 Summer Olympics.
