= Gang Hua =

Chinese-American computer scientist (born 1979)

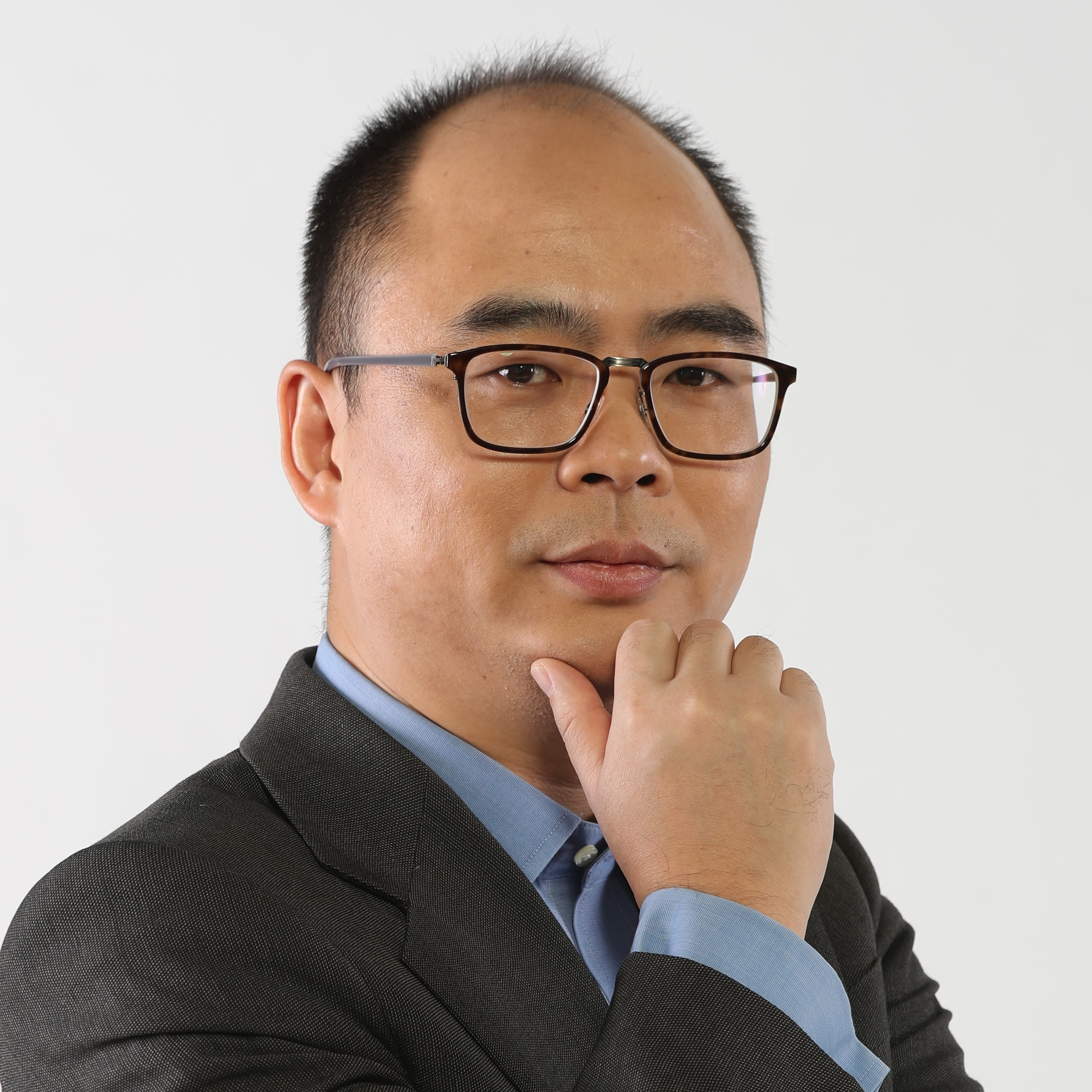
- Born: Hunan, China
- Citizenship: U.S.A.
- Education: Northwestern University; Xian Jiaotong University
- Known for: Computer Vision; Pattern Recognition; Machine Learning; Robotics; Artificial Intelligence
- Awards: IEEE Fellow; IAPR Fellow; ACM Distinguished Member; IAPR Young Biometrics Investigator Award (2015)
- Scientific career
- Fields: Computer Science; Electrical Engineering; Computer Engineering
- Workplaces: Dolby Laboratories, Inc.
- Website: www.ganghua.org

Gang Hua (Chinese: 华刚; born 1979) is a Chinese-American computer scientist who specializes in the field of computer vision and pattern recognition. He is an IEEE Fellow, IAPR Fellow and ACM Distinguished Member. He is a key contributor to Microsoft's Facial Recognition technologies.

== Biography ==
Gang Hua is a Director of Applied Science at Amazon (company), leading efforts in building the personalized, proactive, autonomous and multi-modal conversation agent for Alexa+, which can fulfill end-to-end tasks on customers' behalf. His research focuses on agentic, embodied AI, deep learning, computer vision, pattern recognition, machine learning, recommendation, and robotics.

Before that, he was the Vice President of the Multimodal Experiences Research Lab at Dolby Laboratories, leading efforts on building enabling technologies and systems to support next generation media experiences that are natively multi-modal, personalized, immersive, and interactive. He was the Chief Technology Officer of Convenience Bee, and Chief Scientist and Managing Director of its research branch, Wormpex AI Research. He also served in various roles at Microsoft (2015–18) as the science/technical adviser to the CVP of the Computer Vision Group, director of Computer Vision Science Team in Redmond and Taipei ATL, and principal researcher/research manager at Microsoft Research. He was an associate professor in Computer Science at Stevens Institute of Technology (2011–15). During 2014-15, he took an on leave and worked at Amazon (company) on the Amazon-Go project. He was an visiting researcher (2011–14) and a research staff member (2010–11) at IBM Thomas J. Watson Research Center, a senior researcher (2009–10) at Nokia Research Center Hollywood, and a scientist (2006–09) at Microsoft Live Labs.

He received his Ph.D. degree in Electrical Engineering and Computer Engineering from Northwestern University in 2006. He received his M.S. degree in Pattern Recognition and Intelligent System in 2002 and B.S. degree in Control Engineering and Science in 1999, both from Xi'an Jiaotong University. In 1994, he was selected to the Special Class for Gifted Young in Xi'an Jiaotong University.

== Services ==
He is a general chair for IEEE/CVF International Conference on Computer Vision 2027. He is a program chair for IEEE/CVF Conference on Computer Vision and Pattern Recognition 2019 and 2022.

He is also a member of the editorial board of IEEE Transactions on Pattern Analysis and Machine Intelligence, International Journal of Computer Vision, and IAPR Journal of Machine Vision and Applications. He was an associate editor-in-chief for Computer Vision and Image Understanding (2015-2020), an associate editor for IEEE Transactions on Image Processing for two terms (2012–2015, 2017–2019) and IEEE Transactions on Circuit Systems and Video Technologies (2015–2019), and Vision and View Department editor for IEEE MultiMedia Magazine (2011–2016).

== Awards ==
In 2022, Hua was elected to be a Fellow of Asia-Pacific Artificial Intelligence Association (AAIA) for contributions to computer vision. In 2018, Hua was elevated to a Fellow of Institute of Electrical and Electronics Engineers for contributions to Facial Recognition in Images and Videos. In 2016, Hua was elected as a Fellow of International Association for Pattern Recognition for contributions to visual computing and learning from unconstrained images and videos and a Distinguished Scientist of Association for Computing Machinery for contributions to Multimedia and Computer Vision. He is the recipient of the 2015 IAPR Young Biometrics Investigator Award for contributions to Unconstrained Face Recognition in Images and Videos.
