= Gilbert Kaiser =

Liechtenstein sports shooter (born 1949)

Personal information
- Nationality: Liechtenstein
- Born: 20 April 1949 (age 75)

Sport
- Sport: Sports shooting

Gilbert Kaiser (born 20 April 1949) is a Liechtenstein sports shooter. He competed in the men's 10 metre air rifle event at the 1988 Summer Olympics.
