= Yair Davidovitz =

Israeli sports shooter

Personal information
- Native name: יאיר דוידוביץ
- National team: Israel
- Born: March 26, 1950 (age 76) Poland
- Occupation: International Shooting Sport Federation (ISSF) technical delegate
- Height: 5 ft 8.5 in (174.0 cm)
- Weight: 154 lb (70 kg)

Sport
- Sport: Sport shooting
- Events: Men's Air Rifle, 10 metres; Men's Small-Bore Rifle, Three Positions, 50 metres; Men's Small-Bore Rifle, Prone, 50 metres
- Club: Hapoel Ashkelon
- Coached by: Shlomo Goldstein

Achievements and titles
- Personal best(s): World record (tied) for 40 shots in a prone position; the maximum 400 points (April 1984)

Yair Davidovitz (Hebrew: יאיר דוידוביץ; born March 22, 1945) is an Israeli former Olympic sport shooter, and in 1984 matched the world record of a perfect score of 400 in the Men's Small-Bore Rifle, Prone, 50 metres.

He was born in Israel, and is Jewish.

== Childhood ==
Yair Davidovitz was born to mother and father Issac and Ada Davidovitch.

== Shooting career ==
His club was Hapoel Ashkelon. He was trained by Shlomo Goldstein, of Israel's 1972 Olympic team. In April 1984, he matched the world record for 40 shots in a prone position, scoring the maximum 400 points, in an intentional open tournament in Mexico.

He competed for Israel at the 1984 Summer Olympics in Los Angeles, California, in sport shooting at the age of 39. In Men's Small-Bore Rifle, Prone, 50 metres, he came in 23rd, in Men's Small-Bore Rifle, Three Positions, 50 metres (with 1,099 points—388 for prone, 345 for standing, and 366 for kneeling), he came in 46th, and in Men's Air Rifle, 10 metres (after a perfect first round), he did not finish. When he competed in the Olympics he was 5 ft 8.5 in (174.0 cm) tall, and weighed 154 lb (70 kg). Yitzhak Yonassi, his former pupil, also competed in the same Olympic Games.

As of 2015, he was an International Shooting Sport Federation (ISSF) technical delegate. He was slated to supervise an event in Kuwait for the ISSF in 2015. Kuwait rejected the Israeli's visa for the 2015 Asian Shooting Championships which was originally the tournament that would offer Asian quotas for the 2016 Rio Olympics, and he was backed by the International Olympic Committee and the ISSF, and the qualifiers were moved to New Delhi, India. The IOC said:

"The decision comes after the designated technical delegate from the ISSF, Yair Davidovich (Israel), who was due to supervise the event on behalf of the ISSF, was denied a visa by the Kuwaiti Immigration Department. The denial of a visa is against the non-discrimination principle of the Olympic Charter."
