= Liu Xinqi =

Chinese military officer and politician (born 1956)

- 刘新齐

Commander of Xinjiang Production and Construction Corps
- In office November 2011 – April 2017
- Preceded by: Hua Shifei
- Succeeded by: Peng Jiarui

Personal details
- Born: October 1956 (age 69–70) Shanghe County, Shandong, China
- Party: Chinese Communist Party (1977–2017; expelled)
- Education: Central Party School of the Chinese Communist Party

Military service
- Allegiance: People's Republic of China
- Branch/service: People's Liberation Army Ground Force
- Years of service: 1975–2017
- Unit: 1st Division, 3rd Division, and 4th Division of the Xinjiang Production and Construction Corps

Chinese name
- Simplified Chinese: 刘新齐
- Traditional Chinese: 劉新齊
Transcriptions
Standard Mandarin
- Hanyu Pinyin: Liú Xīnqí

Liu Xinqi (Chinese: 刘新齐; born October 1956) is former Chinese military officer and politician who served as commander of Xinjiang Production and Construction Corps from 2011 to 2017, until he was investigated by the party's anti-graft watchdog and China's top anti-corruption agency.

== Biography ==
Liu was born in Shanghe County, Shandong, in October 1956. He joined the Chinese Communist Party in April 1977, and enlisted in the People's Liberation Army in October 1975. From October 1975 to June 2001, he successively worked in the 4th Division, 3rd Division, and 1st Division of the Xinjiang Production and Construction Corps. He moved up the ranks to become deputy commander in June 2001. After this office was terminated in November 2011, he was promoted again to become commander, serving until April 2017.

=== Downfall ===
On 24 May 2017, he was put under investigation for alleged "serious violations of discipline" by the Central Commission for Discipline Inspection (CCDI), the party's internal disciplinary body, and the National Supervisory Commission, the highest anti-corruption agency of China. He was expelled from the Chinese Communist Party and downgraded to division director level of non leadership positions (正处级非领导职务). On June 27, his qualification for delegates to the 12th National People's Congress was terminated. His deputy Yang Fulin was placed under investigation in July 2021.

Military offices
Preceded by Hua Shifei	Commander of Xinjiang Production and Construction Corps; 2011–2017	Succeeded by Peng Jiarui
