= Sergio López Miró =

Spanish swimmer

Personal information
- Full name: Sergio López Miró
- National team: Spain
- Born: 15 August 1968 (age 57) Barcelona, Spain
- Height: 1.86 m (6 ft 1 in)
- Weight: 78 kg (172 lb)

Sport
- Sport: Swimming
- Strokes: Breaststroke
- Club: Club Natació Sabadell
- College team: Indiana University (U.S.)
Medal record
Men's swimming
Representing Spain
Olympic Games
Bronze medal – third place	1988 Seoul	200 m breaststroke
European Championships (LC)
Bronze medal – third place	1991 Athens	200 m breaststroke
World Championships (SC)
Silver medal – second place	1993 Palma	4×100 m medley
Mediterranean Games
Gold medal – first place	1987 Latakia	200 m breaststroke

Sergio López Miró (born August 15, 1968) is a former international top swimmer from Spain, who won the bronze medal in the 200 meters breaststroke at the 1988 Summer Olympics in Seoul.

He competed in college for Indiana University and American University. López served as the head coach for the men's and women's swim teams at West Virginia University in Morgantown, West Virginia from 2005 to 2007. In 2007, he became the head swimming coach at The Bolles School in Jacksonville, Florida and coached several swimmers onto the U.S. national team. This includes Ariana Kukors, Charlie Houchin, Ryan Murphy and also Singapore’s Joseph Schooling.

He was appointed head coach of Singapore Swimming as well as an adviser coach of the coaching academy of the Singapore Sports Institute, with his term starting on January 1, 2015.

On April 30, 2018, Virginia Tech athletic director Whit Babcock announced Lopez's hiring as head coach for the university's swimming and diving programs.

He won his first international medal at the 1987 Mediterranean Games.
