= Herbert Memelink =

Dutch sports shooter

Personal information
- Nationality: Dutch
- Born: 3 May 1961 (age 63); Hengelo, Netherlands

Sport
- Sport: Sports shooting

Herbert Memelink (born 3 May 1961) is a Dutch sports shooter. He competed in the men's 10 metre air rifle event at the 1984 Summer Olympics.
