= Kenneth Johnston =

Zimbabwean sports shooter (born 1934)

Personal information
- Nationality: Zimbabwean
- Born: 10 December 1934 (age 90)

Sport
- Sport: Sports shooting

Kenneth Johnston (born 10 December 1934) is a Zimbabwean sports shooter. He competed in the men's 50 metre rifle prone event at the 1988 Summer Olympics.
