= Frank H. Wadsworth =

American forester and conservationist (1915–2022)

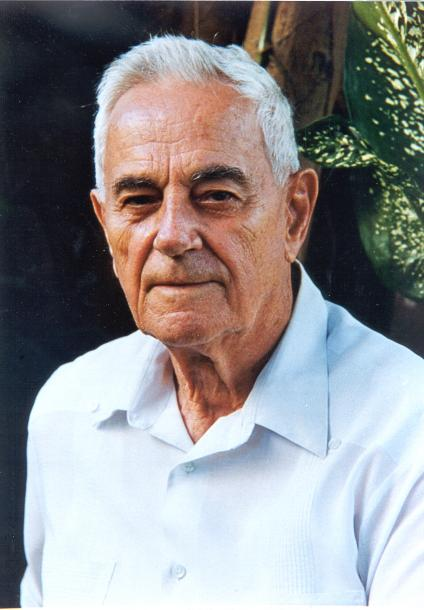
- Portrait of Dr. Wadsworth by the International Institute of Tropical Forestry, 2002
- Born: Frank Howard Wadsworth; November 26, 1915; Chicago, Illinois, U.S.
- Died: January 5, 2022 (aged 106); San Juan, Puerto Rico
- Education: University of Michigan
- Known for: Pioneer in forest management
- Spouses: Margaret Pearson (m. 1941; died 1985): Isabel Colorado Laguna
- Awards: Distinguished Service Award (Order of the Arrow)
- Scientific career
- Fields: Forestry, ecology
- Workplaces: United States Forest Service, International Institute of Tropical Forestry

Frank Howard Wadsworth (November 26, 1915 – January 5, 2022) was an American forester, conservationist and researcher. He made important scientific contributions to forestry, through his work in Puerto Rico where he lived from 1942 until his death.

== Life and education ==
Wadsworth was born on November 26, 1915, in Chicago, Illinois to Robert Wadsworth and Helen Celestia Woodman. From 1941, he was married to Margaret Pearson until her death in 1985; he was later married to Isabel Colorado Laguna until his death in 2022. Wadsworth studied forestry at the University of Michigan where he earned a bachelors and a masters degree in the field. In 1950, he received his PhD in Forestry, focusing on tropical forest and tropical rainforest management in Puerto Rico.

== Work ==
In 1938, Wadsworth worked at the Southwestern Forest and Range Experiment Station at Fort Valley, Arizona. In January 1942, he arrived in Puerto Rico to work at the Tropical Forest Experimental Station in Rio Piedras, Puerto Rico. In 1943, he was elected into Sigma Xi membership.

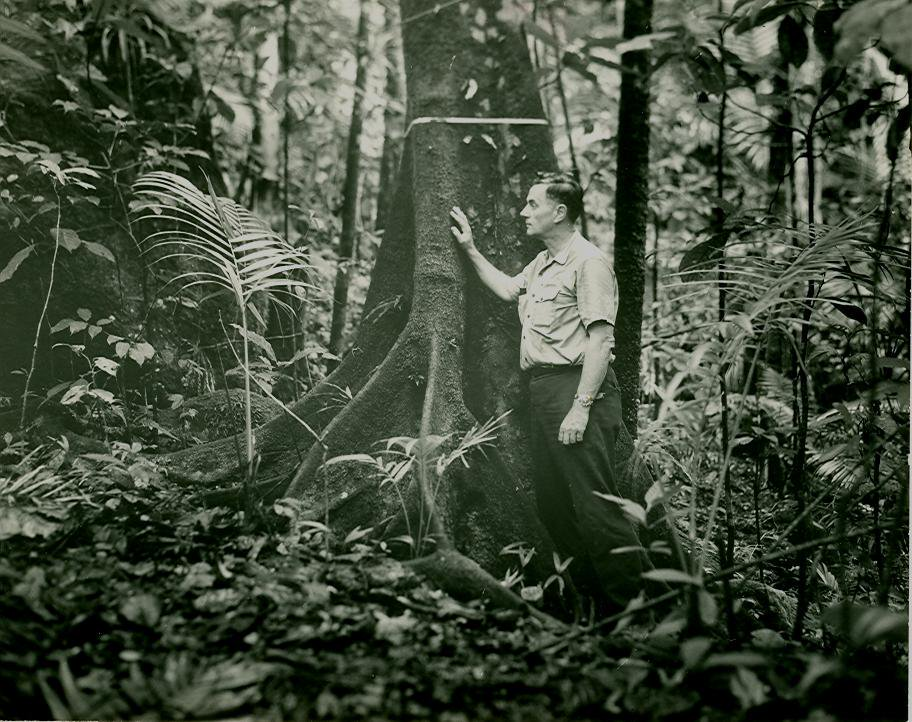
Frank Wadsworth in the 1960s

In the early 1940s, Wadsworth and assistants documented and described all of Puerto Rico's trees: 755 tree species were listed and then began a scientific method to reforest the barren lands of Puerto Rico. In an interview about his work in Puerto Rico, which he gave when he was in his 90s, Wadsworth stated (in perfect Spanish) that he spent the first ten years in Puerto Rico visiting all its forests, documenting species and their condition.

In 1949, he completed the "Multiple Use and Timber Management Plan" for the Caribbean National Forest now known as El Yunque National Forest. That same year, Wadsworth was directly involved with the conservation efforts of the Puerto Rican parrot and was successful in putting aside 3,200 acres for parrot habitat. The Puerto Rican parrot, which had once numbered in the millions, had dwindled to around 2,000 birds by 1949, and then to only 13 by 1975.

By the start of the 20th century, aggressive agricultural use had left Puerto Rico mostly barren of forests, and attempts to restore the tropical forests had all but failed. In the 1950's, along with agronomist José Marrero Torrado, Wadsworth performed comprehensive scientific research and experimentation which led to successful approaches for the reforestation of Puerto Rico. The lessons learned from these studies and efforts paved the way for reforestation efforts for tropical forests in Central and South America. During his 80 years of work, mostly in Puerto Rico, his research was published in more than a hundred books and scientific journals.

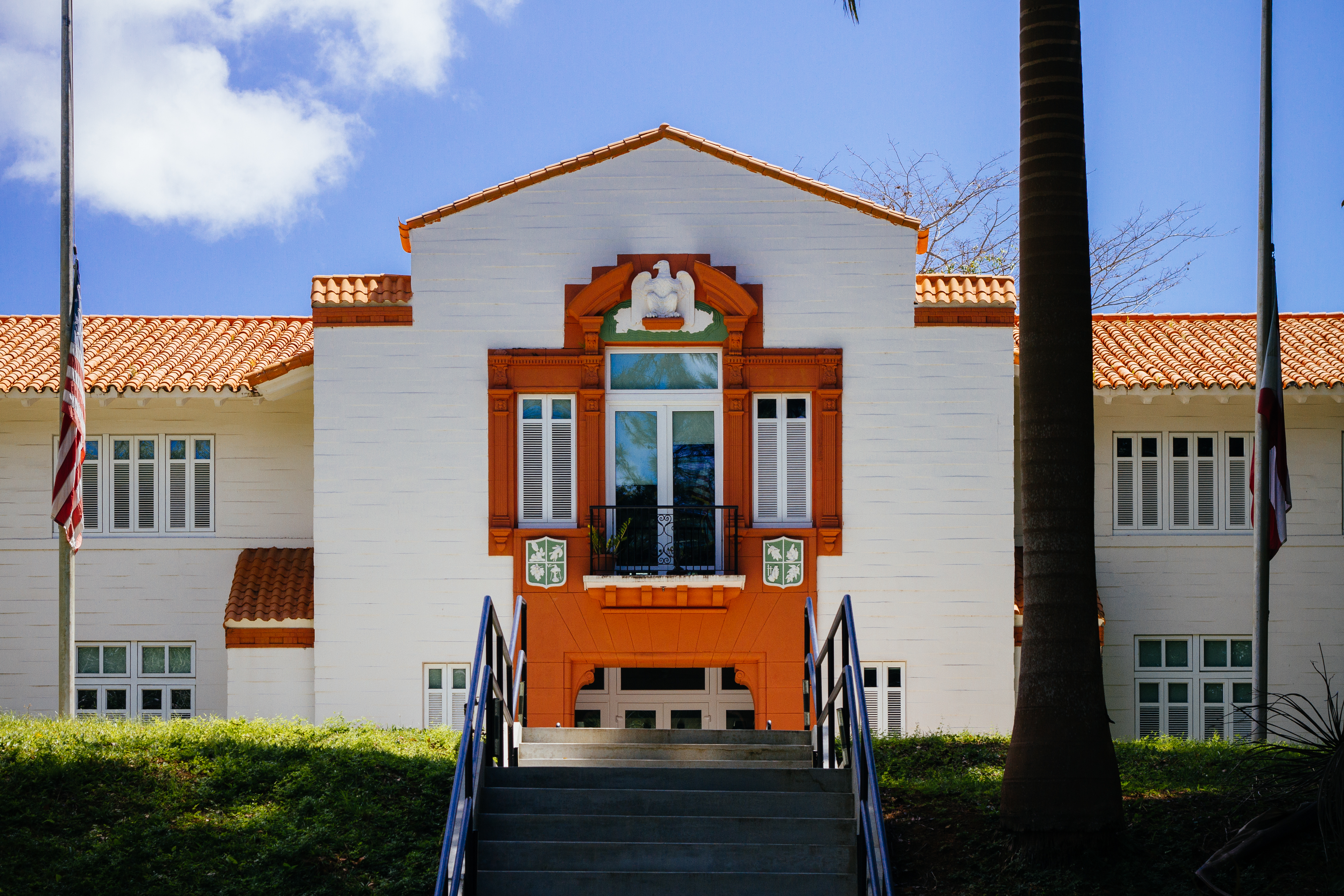
Wadsworth served as the Director of The International Institute of Tropical Forestry in Río Piedras, Puerto Rico.

In 1956, he took a position with the United States Forest Service as the supervisor of the El Yunque National Forest and subsequently became the Director of the International Institute of Tropical Forestry (IITF).

In the 1960s, Wadsworth played a key role in the construction of the Yokahú Tower. In 1968, as member of the Governor's Advisory Council, he played a key role in the creation of the Puerto Rico Department of Natural and Environmental Resources.

When interviewed in his late 90s, Wadsworth said that agritourism goes a long way towards conservation of importance resources, surmising that "tourists make us aware of the value of our forests."

== Contributions to Scouting ==
In 1933 Wadsworth earned the rank of Eagle Scout and remained a member of the Boy Scouts of America for most of his life. He made numerous contributions in the conservancy of Guajataka Scout Reservation's forests, and offered numerous educational lectures to Scouts. In 1952, he founded the reservation's Nature Team, which is entrusted with maintaining the Scout camp's nature education programs. In 1954, he co-founded Yokahu Lodge of the Order of the Arrow and served as the Ordeal Master for the first Ordeal ceremony held in Puerto Rico. In 1965, he was awarded the Distinguished Service Award by the Order of the Arrow. In 2003, he published Guía Para la Isla de la Mona, a Scout guidebook on Mona Island, on behalf of the Puerto Rico Council.

== Legacy and honors ==
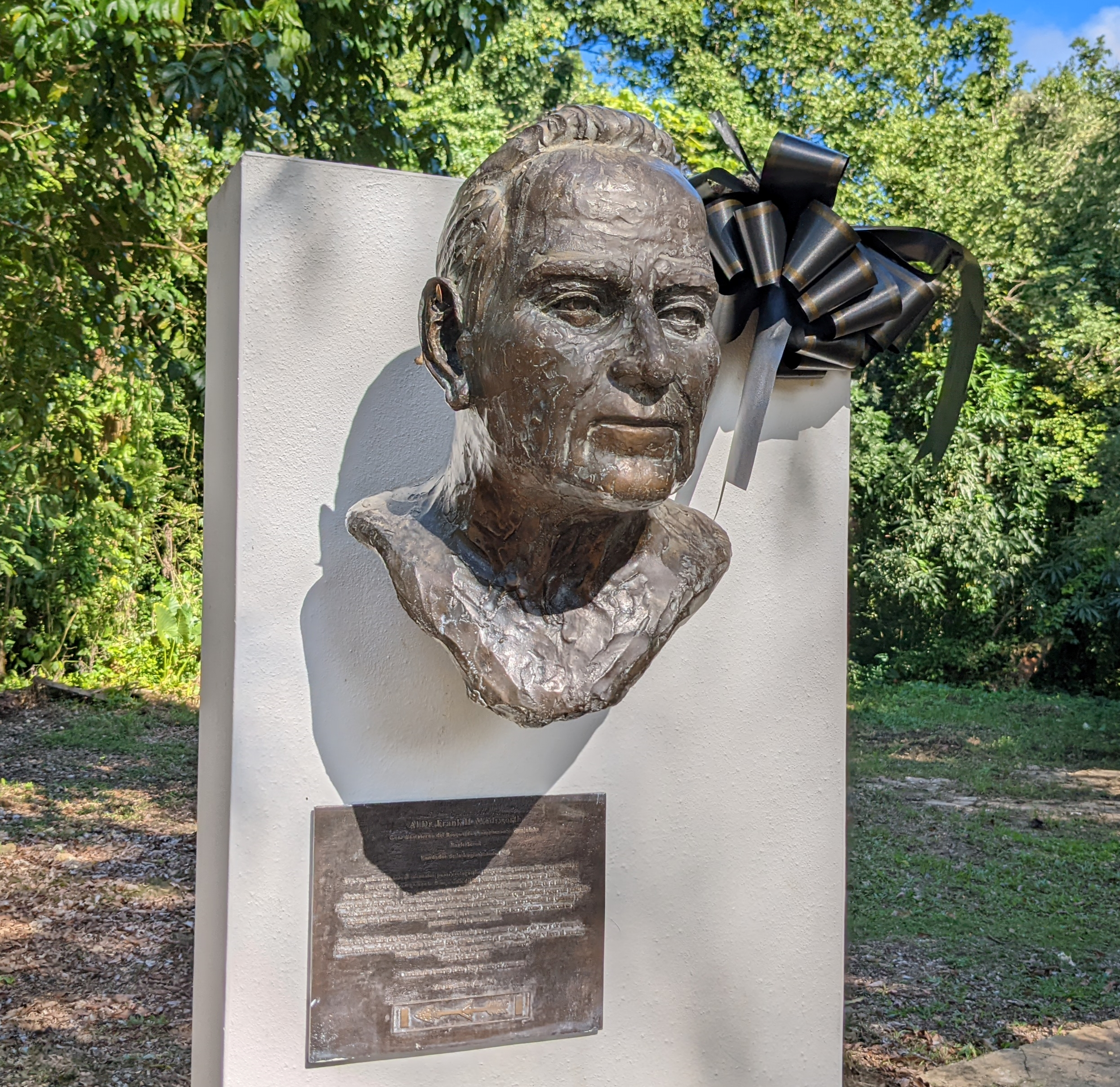
Bust of Dr. Wadsworth located at the Guajataka Scout Reservation, pictured with a black ribbon bow after his passing.

- Byrsonima wadsworthii (Almendrillo in Spanish), a rare and endemic plant found in northeastern Puerto Rico, was named after Wadsworth by botanist Elbert Luther Little.
- In 1998, the International Institute of Tropical Forestry Library in Rio Piedras, Puerto Rico was named after Wadsworth.
- In 2009, the Renewable Natural Resources Foundation recognized Wadsworth with their Sustained Achievement Award.
- In celebration of Wadsworth's 100th birthday, the Puerto Rico Council issued a commemorative patch in 2015 and a posthumous set of patches, neckerchief and belt buckle in 2022.
- For his many contributions to the Scouting movement in Puerto Rico, Wadsworth was bestowed the nickname Agüeybaná, after the Taíno chief of the same name. He was also honored with a bust at the Guajataka Scout Reservation which was unveiled in 2014 with Dr. Wadsworth in attendance.
- Wadsworth's life's work was featured in an episode of Sistema TV's program Geoambiente, aired in 2016.
- In 2016, the Puerto Rico Department of Natural and Environmental Resources named a hiking trail after Wadsworth in the Río Abajo State Forest.
- Wadsworth was featured in the Institute of Puerto Rican Culture's Crónicas 90 series of short documentaries highlighting the lives of people over the age of 90, who have made significant contributions to Puerto Rico's culture and arts.

== See also ==
- List of endemic fauna of Puerto Rico
- List of grasses of Puerto Rico

== External reading ==
- Elbert L., Little Jr.; Wadsworth, Frank H.; José, Marrero. Arboles comunes de Puerto Rico y Las Islas Virgenes (1977) (PDF). Editorial Universaria - La Universidad de Puerto Rico.
- Wadsworth, Frank H. Producción Forestal para América Tropical (PDF). USDA.
