= José Marrero Torrado =

Puerto Rican agronomist (1910-2007)

José Marrero Torrado (4 March 1910 Utuado, Puerto Rico – 13 April 2007, San Juan, Puerto Rico) was a Puerto Rican agronomist and researcher.

== Life and education ==
José Marrero Torrado was born in 1910 in Utuado, Puerto Rico to parents José Marrero Marrero and María Torrado Padilla. He was one of eight siblings. He went to school in Arecibo, Puerto Rico and later attended the University of Puerto Rico at Mayagüez where he obtained a degree in Agronomy.

== Work ==
In 1935, he started working with the United States Forest Service.

In the 1950s alongside forester Frank H. Wadsworth, he performed scientific research and experimentation which led to successful approaches for the reforestation of the island of Puerto Rico.

José Marrero Torrado authored or co-authored various books on the subject of plants.
