= Yang Fulin =

Chinese military officer and politician

- 杨福林

Deputy Commander of Xinjiang Production and Construction Corps
- In office April 2015 – April 2017
- Commander: Liu Xinqi

Personal details
- Born: October 1957 (age 68–69) Wudu County, Gansu, China
- Party: Chinese Communist Party (1982–2021; expelled)
- Education: Gansu Normal University; Central Party School of the Chinese Communist Party

Military service
- Allegiance: People's Republic of China
- Branch/service: People's Liberation Army Ground Force
- Years of service: 1976–2017
- Unit: 8th Division, 6th Division, 14th Division, and 3rd Division of the Xinjiang Production and Construction Corps

Chinese name
- Simplified Chinese: 杨福林
- Traditional Chinese: 楊福林
Transcriptions
Standard Mandarin
- Hanyu Pinyin: Yáng Fúlín

Yang Fulin (Chinese: 杨福林; born October 1957) is a former Chinese military officer and politician who served as deputy commander of Xinjiang Production and Construction Corps from 2015 to 2017. He was investigated by China's top anti-graft agency in July 2021.

== Biography ==
Yang was born in Wudu County (now Wudu District of Longnan), Gansu, in October 1957. He enlisted in the People's Liberation Army in August 1976, and joined the Chinese Communist Party (CCP) in November 1982. He assumed various posts in the 8th Division of Xinjiang Production and Construction Corps between 1976 and 2001. From 2001 to 2013, he successively worked in the 6th Division, 14th Division, and 3rd Division. In July 2013, he became secretary of the Political and Legal Affairs Commission of Xinjiang Production and Construction Corps, and held that office until April 2015, when he was commissioned as deputy commander of Xinjiang Production and Construction Corps.

=== Downfall ===
On 29 July 2021, he was put under investigation for alleged "serious violations of discipline and laws" by the Central Commission for Discipline Inspection (CCDI), the party's internal disciplinary body, and the National Supervisory Commission, the highest anti-corruption agency of China. His superior Liu Xinqi was under investigation for alleged "serious violations of discipline" in May 2017 and downgraded to division director level of non leadership positions (正处级非领导职务). On December 1, he was expelled from the Communist Party.

On 13 March 2022, he was indicted on suspicion of accepting bribes.
