= Ove Sjögren =

Swedish sports shooter

Personal information
- Nationality: Swedish
- Born: 20 December 1958 (age 66); Uppsala, Sweden

Sport
- Sport: Sports shooting

Ove Sjögren (born 20 December 1958) is a Swedish sports shooter. He competed in the men's 10 metre air rifle event at the 1984 Summer Olympics.
