= Hartmut Wedekind =

German swimmer

Personal information
- Born: 16 June 1964 (age 62) Duisburg, West Germany

Sport
- Sport: Swimming

Hartmut Wedekind (born 16 June 1964) is a German swimmer. He competed in the men's 200 metre breaststroke at the 1988 Summer Olympics representing West Germany.
