= Ling Guang =

Chinese basketball player

Personal information
- Nationality: Chinese
- Born: 1 March 1966 (age 59); Shanghai, China

Sport
- Sport: Basketball

Ling Guang (Chinese: 凌光; pinyin: Líng Guāng, born 1 March 1966) is a Chinese basketball player. She competed in the women's tournament at the 1988 Summer Olympics.
