= Israel Shooting Federation =

Sporting organization in Israel

Israel Shooting Federation התאחדות הקליעה בישראל
- Chairman: Michael Rohar
- General Manager: Eran Moses
- Parent organization: IPSC, ISSF

The Israel Shooting Federation (התאחדות הקליעה בישראל) is the Israeli association for shooting sports affiliated to the International Shooting Sport Federation and the International Practical Shooting Confederation.
