= Ondřej Bureš =

Czech swimmer

Personal information
- Born: 24 September 1966 Prague, Czechoslovakia
- Died: 23 June 1999 (aged 32) Bakersfield, USA

Sport
- Sport: Swimming

Ondřej Bureš (24 September 1966 – 23 June 1999) was a Czech swimmer. He competed in two events at the 1988 Summer Olympics.
