= Jack van Bekhoven =

Dutch sports shooter

Personal information
- Nationality: Dutch
- Born: 23 October 1959 (age 65); Terheijden, Netherlands

Sport
- Sport: Sports shooting

Jack van Bekhoven (born 23 October 1959) is a Dutch sports shooter. He competed at the 1988 Summer Olympics and the 1992 Summer Olympics.
