= Svetlana Kuznetsova (basketball) =

Russian basketball player

Svetlana Kuznetsova (born 10 January 1965) is a Russian former basketball player who competed in the 1996 Summer Olympics.
