= Kirill Ivanov (sport shooter) =

Soviet sport shooter (born 1960)

Personal information
- Born: January 14, 1960 (age 66)
Medal record
Men's Shooting
Representing Soviet Union
Olympic Games
Bronze medal – third place	1988 Seoul	50 m rifle, three positions

Kirill Ivanov (born January 14, 1960, in Leningrad) is a Russian sports shooter. He competed in rifle shooting events at the Summer Olympics in 1988 and 1992. In 1988, he won the bronze medal in the men's 50 metre rifle three positions event. Currently, he is coaching the Singapore Shooting Team.

== Olympic results ==
Event	1988	1992
50 metre rifle three positions (men)	(bronze) 3rd	T-31st
50 metre rifle prone (men)	T-15th	T-24th
