= Jorge Bracero =

Puerto Rican sports shooter

Personal information
- Nationality: Puerto Rican
- Born: 15 May 1948 (age 76)

Sport
- Sport: Sports shooting

Jorge Bracero (born 15 May 1948) is a Puerto Rican sports shooter. He competed in the men's 50 metre rifle prone event at the 1988 Summer Olympics.
