= Hua Jiansheng =

Chinese sports shooter

Personal information
- Nationality: Chinese
- Born: 6 January 1963 (age 62)

Sport
- Sport: Sports shooting

Hua Jiansheng (born 6 January 1963) is a Chinese sports shooter. He competed in the men's 10 metre air rifle event at the 1984 Summer Olympics.
