= Hua Shifei =

Chinese military officer and politician

- 华士飞

Commander of Xinjiang Production and Construction Corps
- In office March 2005 – November 2011
- Preceded by: Zhang Qingli
- Succeeded by: Liu Xinqi

Personal details
- Born: April 1947 (age 78–79) Nanhui County, Shanghai, Republic of China
- Party: Chinese Communist Party

Military service
- Allegiance: People's Republic of China
- Branch/service: People's Liberation Army Ground Force
- Years of service: 1964–2011
- Unit: 10th Division of the Xinjiang Production and Construction Corps

Chinese name
- Simplified Chinese: 华士飞
- Traditional Chinese: 華士飛
Transcriptions
Standard Mandarin
- Hanyu Pinyin: Huà Shìfēi

Hua Shifei (Chinese: 华士飞; born April 1947) is a Chinese military officer and politician who served as commander of Xinjiang Production and Construction Corps from 2005 to 2011.

== Biography ==
Hua was born in Nanhui County (now Nanhui District) of Shanghai, in April 1947. He enlisted in the People's Liberation Army in June 1964, and joined the Chinese Communist Party (CCP) in December 1970. He served in the 10th Division of the Xinjiang Production and Construction Corps for a long time. He was appointed commander of Xinjiang Production and Construction Corps in March 2005 and was admitted to member of the standing committee of the CCP Xinjiang Uygur Autonomous Regional Committee, the region's top authority. In February 2012, he became vice chairperson of the Ethnic and Religious Affairs Committee of the Chinese People's Political Consultative Conference, serving in the post until his retirement in March 2018. He was a member of the 11th National Committee of the Chinese People's Political Consultative Conference.

Military offices
Preceded by Zhang Qingli	Commander of Xinjiang Production and Construction Corps; 2005–2011	Succeeded by Liu Xinqi
