= Machine Vision and Applications =

- Discipline: Image processing
- Language: English
- Edited by: Mubarak Shah

Publication details
- History: 1988-present
- Publisher: Springer Science+Business Media
- Frequency: Bimonthly
- Open access: Hybrid
- Impact factor: 1.103 (2012)

Standard abbreviations
- ISO 4: Mach. Vis. Appl.

Indexing
- CODEN: MVAPEO
- ISSN: 0932-8092 (print); 1432-1769 (web)
- LCCN: 88646805
- OCLC no.: 41233993

Links
- Journal homepage; Online archive

Machine Vision and Applications is a bimonthly peer-reviewed scientific journal covering image processing. It was established in 1988 and is published by Springer Science+Business Media. The editor-in-chief is Mubarak Shah (University of Central Florida). According to the Journal Citation Reports, the journal has a 2012 impact factor of 1.103.
