= Cori Blakebrough =

Canadian former basketball player

Cori Blakebrough (born 30 July 1967 in Chatham, Ontario) is a Canadian former basketball player who competed in the 2000 Summer Olympics.
