= Robert Wolf (swimmer) =

Czech swimmer

Personal information
- Born: 13 June 1971 (age 55) Brno, Czechoslovakia

Sport
- Sport: Swimming

Robert Wolf (born 13 June 1971) is a Czech swimmer. He competed in two events at the 1988 Summer Olympics.
