= Jennie Evans Moore Seymour =

Azusa Street Revival leader (1874–1936)

Jennie Evans Moore Seymour (March 10, 1874-July 2, 1936), was an African-American Holiness leader in the Azusa Street Revival. She was one of the first seven persons to experience the phenomenon of speaking in tongues after meeting in a house where they prayed together on Bonnie Brae Street. She was married to William J. Seymour on May 13, 1908. After the height of the Azusa Street Revival waned, she co-pastored the church with her husband. After suffering from two heart attacks, her husband William J. Seymour died in her arms on September 28, 1922. Jennie Seymour died almost 14 years later on July 2, 1936, and was buried next to her husband in Evergreen Cemetery, Los Angeles, California.
