= Jean-Claude Kremer =

Luxembourgish sports shooter

Personal information
- Nationality: Luxembourgish
- Born: 25 June 1963 (age 61); Luxembourg, Luxembourg

Sport
- Sport: Sports shooting

Jean-Claude Kremer (born 25 June 1963) is a Luxembourgish sports shooter. He competed at the 1988 Summer Olympics and the 1992 Summer Olympics.
