= Cameron Grant =

Canadian swimmer (born 1970)

Personal information
- Born: 24 February 1970 (age 56) Edmonton, Alberta, Canada

Sport
- Sport: Swimming

Cameron Grant (born 24 February 1970) is a Canadian former breaststroke swimmer. He competed in two events at the 1988 Summer Olympics.
