= Svatava Kysilková =

Czech basketball player

Personal information
- Nationality: Czech
- Born: 29 December 1964 (age 60); Prague, Czechoslovakia

Sport
- Sport: Basketball

Svatava Kysilková (born 29 December 1964) is a Czech basketball player. She competed in the women's tournament at the 1988 Summer Olympics.
