= Khady Diop =

Senegalese basketball player

Personal information
- Born: 7 November 1971 (age 53); Dakar, Senegal
- Listed height: 182 cm (6 ft 0 in)
- Listed weight: 71 kg (157 lb)

Khardiata "Khady" Sourangué Diop (also spelled Khadidiatou) (born 7 November 1971 in Dakar, Senegal) is a Senegalese former basketball player who competed in the 2000 Summer Olympics.
