= Andreas Kronthaler (sport shooter) =

Austrian sport shooter (1952–2025)

Olympic medal record

Men's shooting

Representing Austria
Silver medal – second place	1984 Los Angeles	10 m air rifle

Andreas Kronthaler (11 March 1952 – 14 March 2025) was an Austrian sport shooter who competed in the 1984 Summer Olympics. Kronthaler died on 14 March 2025, at the age of 73.
