= Jozef Regec =

Czech-Slovak politician (born 1965)

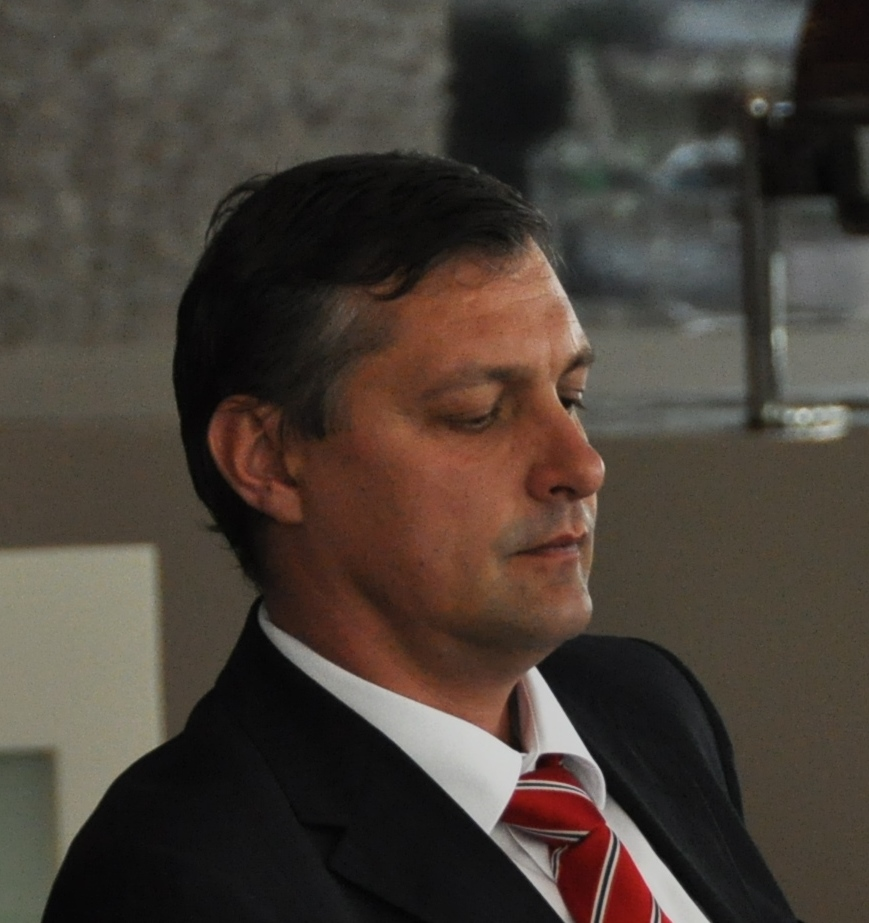

Personal information
- Born: 29 March 1965 (age 61) Kežmarok, Czechoslovakia

Cycling career
- Sport: Cycling

Jozef Regec (born 29 March 1965) is a Czech-Slovak politician and a retired professional cyclist. He was member of national bicycle team of Czechoslovakia between 1986 and 1993 and of the Czech Republic between 1993 and 2000. Born in Slovakia, he represented Czechoslovakia in the men's individual road race at the 1988 Summer Olympics in Seoul.

In January 2024, Regec became the second vice-chairman of the extra-parliamentary party Law, Respect, Expertise (PRO 2022).
