= Simone Pontello =

Brazilian basketball player (born 1971)

Personal information
- Born: 8 September 1971 (age 54) São Paulo, Brazil

Sport
- Sport: Basketball
Medal record
Women's basketball
Representing Brazil
World Cup
Gold medal – first place	1994 Australia	Team
Pan American Games
Gold medal – first place	1991 Havana	Team

Simone Pontello (born 8 September 1971) is a Brazilian basketball player. She competed in the women's tournament at the 1992 Summer Olympics.
