= Chu Hui (basketball) =

Chinese basketball player

Personal information
- Nationality: Chinese
- Born: 21 February 1969 (age 56); Liaoning, China

Sport
- Sport: Basketball

Chu Hui (Chinese: 初慧; pinyin: Chū Huì; born 21 February 1969) is a Chinese basketball player. She competed in the women's tournament at the 1996 Summer Olympics.
