= Eva Křížová =

Czech basketball player

Personal information
- Nationality: Czech
- Born: 20 October 1966 (age 58); Prague, Czechoslovakia

Sport
- Sport: Basketball

Eva Křížová (born 20 October 1966) is a Czech basketball player. She competed in the women's tournament at the 1988 Summer Olympics.
