= Zora Brziaková =

Slovak basketball player (born 1964)

Personal information
- Nationality: Slovak
- Born: 14 March 1964 (age 61); Košice, Czechoslovakia

Sport
- Sport: Basketball

Zora Brziaková (born 14 March 1964) is a Slovak basketball player. She competed in the women's tournament at the 1988 Summer Olympics.
