= Kurt Thune =

Finnish sports shooter

Personal information
- Nationality: Finnish
- Born: 18 August 1953 (age 71); Stockholm, Sweden

Sport
- Sport: Sports shooting

Kurt Thune (born 18 August 1953) is a Finnish sports shooter. He competed in two events at the 1988 Summer Olympics. Born in Sweden, Thune moved to Finland in 1983, and before the 1988 Olympics, he represented Sweden in competitions.
