= Roderick Fitz-Randolph =

American sports shooter

Personal information
- Nationality: American
- Born: January 21, 1959 (age 67) Starkville, Mississippi, United States

Sport
- Sport: Sports shooting

Roderick Fitz-Randolph (born January 21, 1959) is an American former sports shooter. He competed in the men's 10 metre air rifle event at the 1988 Summer Olympics.

Fitz-Randolph became a board-certified anesthesiologist in 1985 and was still practicing as of 2010.
