= Nicolas Berthelot =

French sport shooter (born 1964)

Medal record

Men's sport shooting

Representing France

Olympic Games
| Silver medal – second place | 1988 Seoul | 10 m air rifle |

Nicolas Berthelot (born 26 July 1964) is a French sports shooter and Olympic medalist. He won silver medal in the 10 metre air rifle at the 1988 Summer Olympics in Seoul.
