= International Institute of Tropical Forestry =

Program of the United States Forest Service

Coordinates: 18°23′22″N 66°03′19″W

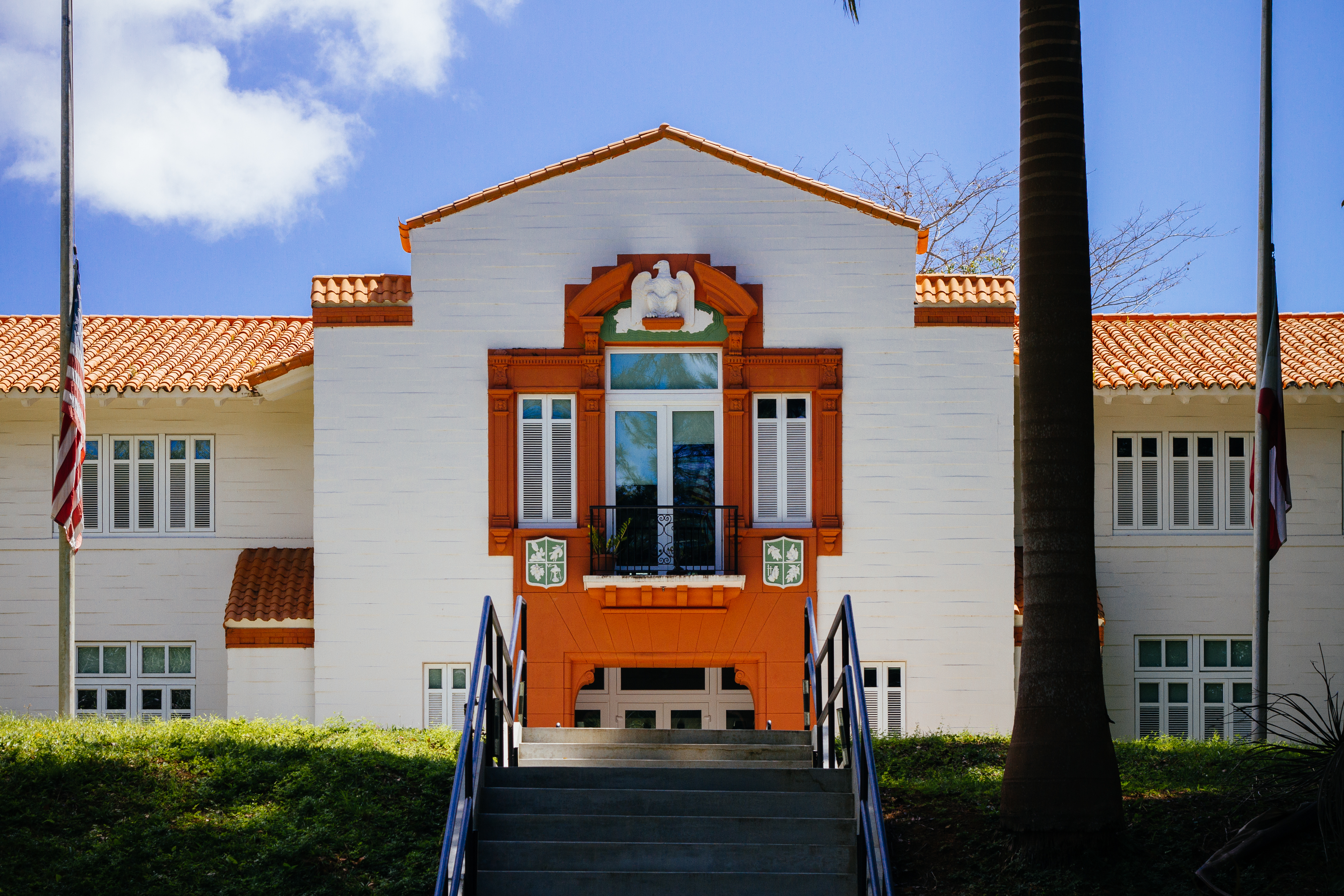
International Institute of Tropical Forestry in Río Piedras, Puerto Rico (2014)

The International Institute of Tropical Forestry (Instituto Internacional de Dasonomía Tropical) is a program of the United States Forest Service that was founded in 1939. It is headquartered in Rio Piedras, Puerto Rico, on the grounds of the University of Puerto Rico's Agricultural Experimental Station.

== History and operations ==
Dr. Ariel E. Lugo was the director after 1979. Lugo was succeeded in the position in 2022 by Dr. Grizelle Gonzalez.

Hurricanes Irma and Maria, both in September 2017, severely disrupted the institute's work.

Its headquarters building was designed by architect W. Ellis Groben.

May 20, 2014, marked the institute's 75th anniversary.

== Gallery ==
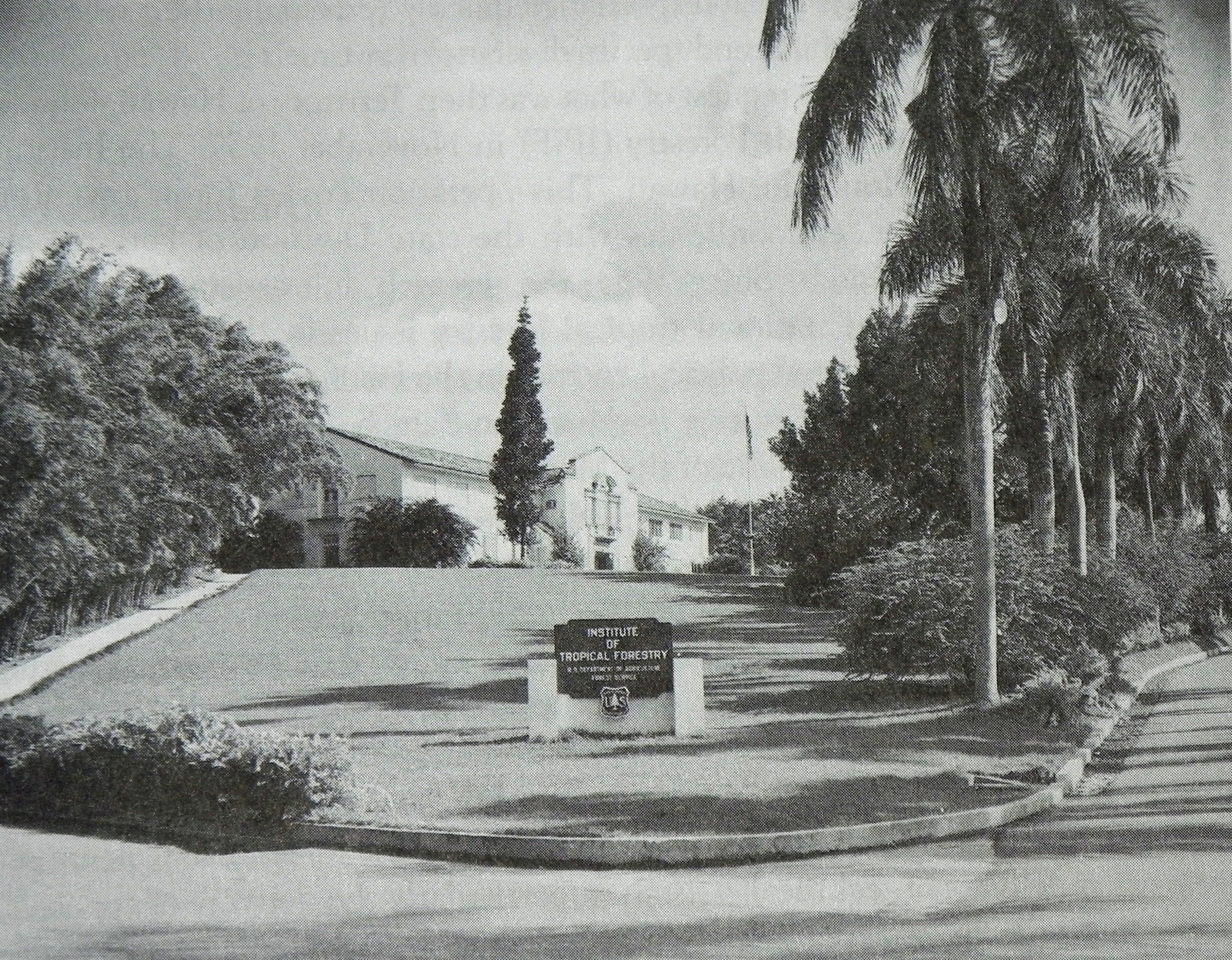
The International Institute of Tropical Forestry c. 1960

== See also ==
- Frank H. Wadsworth
