= UPRRP College of Natural Sciences =

In the Río Piedras section of San Juan, Puerto Rico

College of Natural Sciences
- Established: 1943
- Students: 18,653
- Location: San Juan, Puerto Rico; 18.403027°N 66.045875°W
- Nickname: Naturales
- Website: natsci.uprrp.edu

The College of Natural Sciences of the University of Puerto Rico, Río Piedras (Spanish: Universidad de Puerto Rico, Recinto de Río Piedras), was established in 1943. It is one of several colleges that make up the University of Puerto Rico, Rio Piedras campus. Facundo Bueso Sanllehí was its first dean. It is located in the city of San Juan, the capital of Puerto Rico.

== Centers ==
- Center for Applied Tropical Ecology and Conservation (CREST-CATEC)
- Center for Nanoscale Materials

== Facilities ==
- Animal House
- Botanical Garden
- Center for Educational Production Services
- Computing Center
- Department of Chemistry Support Facilities
- Electronics Workshop
- Field House at El Yunque (El Verde)
- Greenhouse
- Herbarium
- Instrumentation Workshop
- Machining Workshop
- Natural Sciences Library
- Zoology Museum
