= Radek Beinhauer =

Czech swimmer

Personal information
- Born: 27 September 1969 (age 56) Znojmo, Czechoslovakia

Sport
- Sport: Swimming

Radek Beinhauer (born 27 September 1969) is a Czech swimmer. He competed at the 1988 Summer Olympics and the 1992 Summer Olympics.
