= Miroslav Varga =

Czechoslovak sport shooter

Medal record

Men's sport shooting

Representing Czechoslovakia

Olympic Games
Gold medal – first place	1988 Seoul	50 metre rifle prone

Miroslav Varga (born 21 September 1960 in Žatec) is a sport shooter and Olympic champion for Czechoslovakia. He won a gold medal in the 50 metre rifle prone event at the 1988 Summer Olympics in Seoul.

He represented the Czech Republic at the 2008 Olympics in Beijing.
