= Jenny Reisener =

Australian basketball player

Personal information
- Born: 4 August 1967 (age 59) Port Moresby, Papua New Guinea
Medal record
Women's Basketball
Representing Australia

Jenny Evans (née Reisener) (born 4 August 1967) is a former Australian women's basketball player.

== Biography ==
Reisener played for the Australia women's national basketball team during the late 1980s and early 1990s and competed for Australia at the 1990 World Championship held in Brazil. During that period, Reisener played 48 games for the Opals.

Reisener was an Australian Institute of Sport (AIS) Basketball scholarship holder from 1986 to 1987. In the domestic Women's National Basketball League (WNBL), Reisener played 130 games for AIS (1985 to 1987), Perth (1988 & 1989), Sydney (1990) and Brisbane (1995 to 1998).

In 2009, Reisener's daughter, Teyla Evans, gained selection in the Australian under-17 squad. Reisener is a member of the Cairns Basketball Hall of Fame.
