= Attila Záhonyi =

Hungarian sports shooter

Personal information
- Nationality: Hungarian
- Born: 1 December 1959 (age 66) Budapest

Sport
- Sport: Shooting
Medal record
Men's shooting
Representing Hungary
Olympic Games
Bronze medal – third place	1988 Seoul	50 m Rifle Prone

Attila Záhonyi (born 1 December 1959) is a Hungarian sport shooter. He was born in Budapest. He won a bronze medal in 50 metre rifle prone at the 1988 Summer Olympics in Seoul.
