= Irma Valová =

Czech basketball player

Personal information
- Nationality: Czech
- Born: 26 July 1965 (age 59); Zlín, Czechoslovakia

Sport
- Sport: Basketball

Irma Valová (born 26 July 1965) is a Czech basketball player. She competed in the women's tournament at the 1988 Summer Olympics.
