= Alexander Marček =

Slovak swimmer

Personal information
- National team: Czechoslovakia
- Born: 11 September 1968 (age 57) Martin, Czechoslovakia

Sport
- Sport: Swimming

Alexander Marček (born 11 September 1968) is a Slovak swimmer. He competed for Czechoslovakia in two events at the 1988 Summer Olympics.
