= Frank Arens =

Belgian sports shooter

Personal information
- Nationality: Belgian
- Born: 16 August 1959 (age 65); Ghent, Belgium

Sport
- Sport: Sports shooting

Frank Arens (born 16 August 1959) is a Belgian sports shooter. He competed at the 1984 Summer Olympics and the 1988 Summer Olympics.
