= Per Hansson (sport shooter) =

Swedish sports shooter

Personal information
- Nationality: Swedish
- Born: 31 December 1962 (age 62); Stockholm, Sweden

Sport
- Sport: Sports shooting

Per Hansson (born 31 December 1962) is a Swedish sports shooter. He competed in three events at the 1988 Summer Olympics.
