= Mondomarine =

- Founded: 1990’s
- Headquarters: Savona, Italy
- Key people: Roberto Zambrini, Alessandro Falciai (Owner)
- Products: Custom pleasure yachts.
- Website: www.mondomarine.it

Mondomarine is a shipyard active in ship building and repairing based in Savona, Italy, focused on designing, engineering and building custom made yachts over 40 meters in aluminium alloy and steel.

List of Yachts Produced
Christened Name	Current name	Former names	Year	Length	Gross Tonnes
Alexander Again			2011	49.2	534
Impanema			2016	49.2	499
Sarastar			2017	60.2	973
Serenity			2015	42.5	496
Nameless	Shaddow		2013	40.97	351
Manifiq			2010	40.5	
Alexander Two	Legenda		2009	41.1	360
Tribu			2007	50.5	250
Streamline	Mrs L	Auspicious	2009	49.3	499
Okko			2012	41	367
Zaliv III			2011	49.6	499
Toy-A			2009	49.5	355
Panther II	Barents Sea		2008	41.56	
Blue Belle	Blue Breeze		2003	40.45	375
Bash	Ulysses		2009	39.4	333
Tania T	Lady G II		2002	41.5	361
My Way V			2005	40.5	339
Oceanos			2006	48.85	499
Princess Iolanthe			2006	45.5	498
Bina			2006	42.65	399
Alia 7			1991	42	331
Sierra Romeo			2007	41.56	349
Sea Wolf			2008	41.56	294
Seven S			2010	40.5	351
Infinity Pacific			2007	40.2	314
Paula III			1994	35.92	212
Christina V			1998	35.27	236
Chamade			1995	29.8	144
Talila			2000	29	140
Elden			2003	28.86	130
Logica			2002	27.42	
Petardo C			1995	26.05	
Enneffe			2003	24	

== See also ==
- Azimut Yachts
- Baglietto
- Benetti
- Codecasa
- Fincantieri
- Rossinavi
- Sanlorenzo
