= Axis Group Yacht Design =

- Type: Srl
- Industry: Naval architecture Marine engineering
- Founded: 1996
- Founder: Horacio Bozzo
- Headquarters: Viareggio, Italy
- Area served: Worldwide

Axis Group Yacht Design is an Italian naval architecture, marine engineering and design company specialized in the over 40 meter luxury motoryacht market.

== History ==
Founded in USA in 1996, by naval architect & marine engineer Horacio Bozzo, Axis Group Yacht Design has moved to Viareggio, Italy in 2001. Since then, it has established tight collaboration with the most renowned shipyards, such as Perini Navi, Benetti, Azimut, Codecasa, Sanlorenzo, Kingship, ISA, Rossinavi among others. In 2011 Axis has opened a new overseas representative office in Shanghai, which will be based at the Jin Mao Tower, the fifth tallest building in the world.

Horacio Bozzo set up in 2013 his own design brand for Superyacht: Horacio Bozzo Design.

== Yacht designed ==
Among Axis Group Yacht Design projects: the 54 meters (177 feet) motoryacht Forever One launched in June 2014 at ISA facilities, the 55 meters (180 feet) Ice Class Motoryacht Vitruvius Picchiotti by Perini Navi, the 40 meters (130 feet) 40Alloy Sanlorenzo and the Green Voyager, an innovative 44 meters (144 feet) Hybrid motoryacht by Kingship Marine. In occasion of the Monaco Boat Show in September 2009, it has been assigned three Green Plus certifications to three megayachts built in Italy, whereas in China, the Green Voyager, is the first hybrid 45 meter yacht required the Green Plus certification. Axis counts also the 70 meters (230 feet) Motoryacht High Power III (ex Numptia) by Rossinavi, launched in summer 2011.

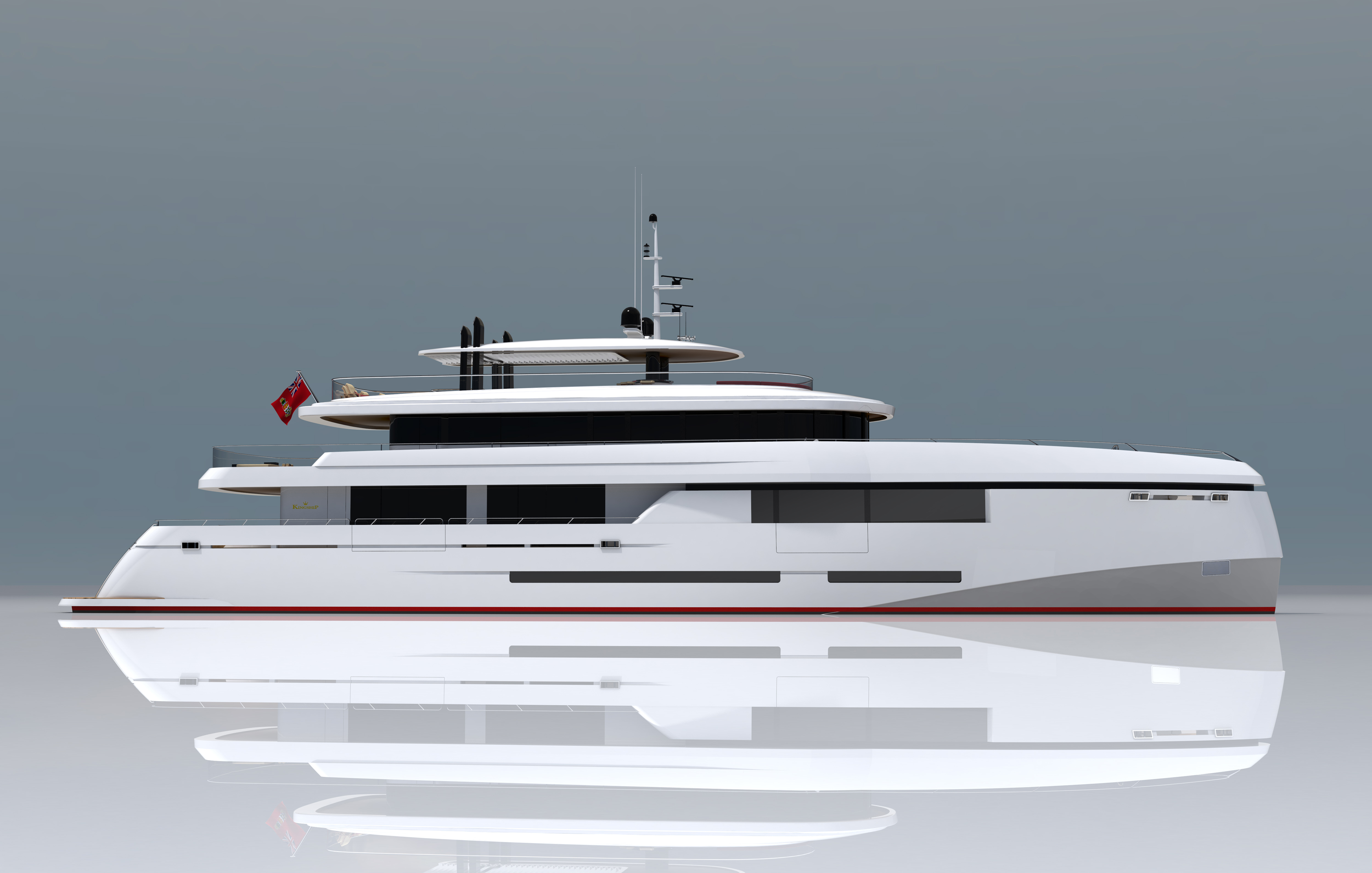
Green Voyager Profile

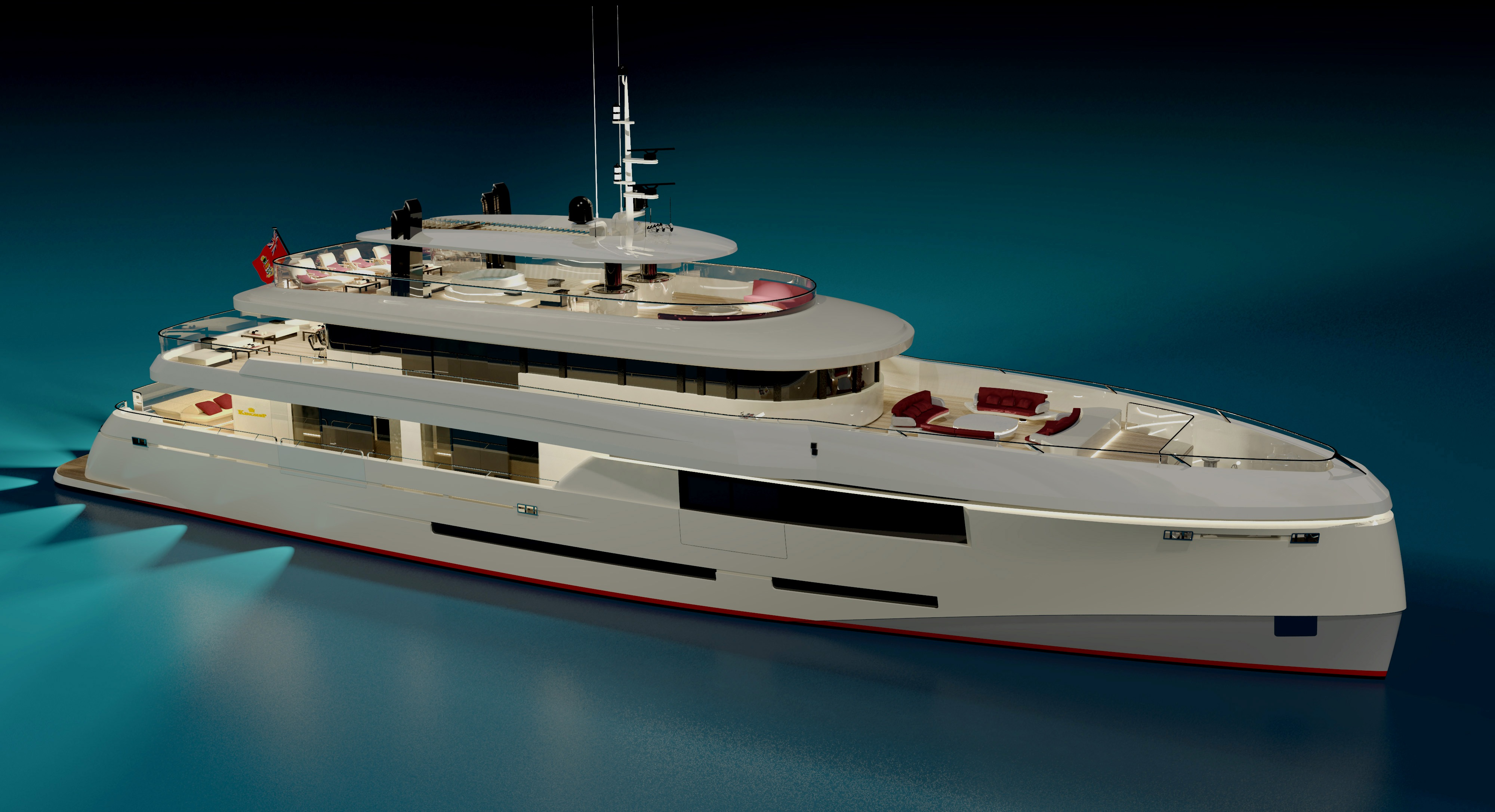
Green Voyager Night View

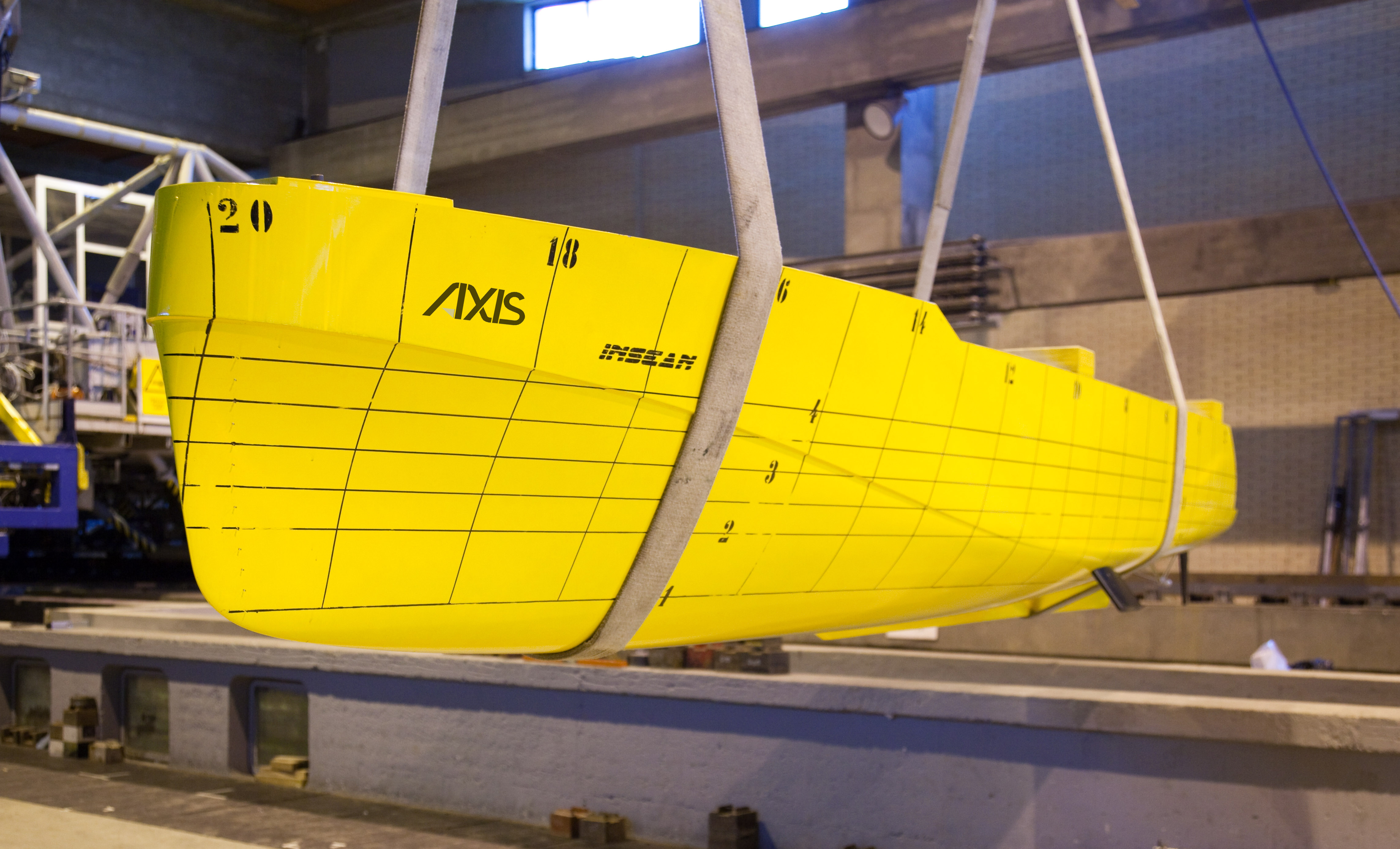
Green Voyager Tank Test

== Award ==
In May 2012 in Hong Kong, Axis Group Yacht Design won the Best Yacht Designer in Asia of the Year 2012 award at the Asia Boating Awards.

In June 2012 in the Principality of Monaco, Axis Group Yacht Design won the Naval Architect Award – Motor Yachts for the 70 meter Motoryacht Numptia (renamed High Power III) at ShowBoats Design Awards.
