= Paolo Vitelli (businessman) =

Italian businessman (1947–2024)

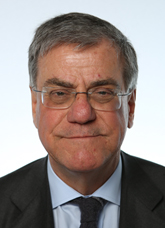

Paolo Vitelli (4 October 1947 – 31 December 2024) was an Italian businessman, the founder in 1969 of the motor yacht company Azimut. He was president of Azimut Benetti Group.

From March 2013 to September 2015, he was a member of parliament in Italy’s Legislature XVII, after being elected to the Civic Choice List with Monti for Italy. Vitelli was also Honorary Consul of Norway from 1974 to 2018.

== Career ==
=== Businessman ===
Paolo Vitelli graduated in June 1970 with a degree in economics and business, after a four-year course of study. His business career began in March 1969 when he set up Azimut, a pleasure boats rental business, using money saved while working student jobs (50,000 old Italian lires) or after selling the nightclub Tempio Sei he had founded with his friends. The following year, after graduating, he took his company to the Genoa International Boat Show. Amerglass, then Europe’s most advanced shipyard, chose Azimut to import its models into Italy. Vitelli then started to build boats under his own brand, which became Azimut Yachts. In 1988, he created a new and modern shipyard in Avigliana. His company grew rapidly and became the world’s leading builder of motor yachts over 24 metres in length. In 1985, his company acquired the Benetti shipyard in Viareggio, an emblem of Italian excellence that went bankrupt building the Nabila, and changed its name to Azimut|Benetti, a company specialized in building superyachts for the super-rich.

Azimut|Benetti builds motor yachts from 10 to over 100 metres in length, under the Azimut Yachts and Benetti brands, in six shipyards: Avigliana in Piemonte, Savona in Liguria, Viareggio and Livorno in Tuscany, Fano in Le Marche and Itajai in Brazil. It posts annual sales of around one million euros and employs around 2,000 people in its shipyards, while nearly 5,000 people work in its permanent supply chain. Azimut|Benetti sells 95% of its production abroad through a global network of dealers in 70 countries, supported by offices managed directly by the company in the world’s main yachting centers. In 2019, Azimut|BEnetti reported 900 million euros in annual sales.

Paolo Vitelli was involved in the construction of modern tourist ports in Varazze, Viareggio and Livorno in Italy, in the old town in La Valletta, Malta, and on Lake Chimki (Moscow) in Russia. He created a small chain of “Hotels de Charme” that restore old buildings in Chamonix in France and Champoluc and Mascognaz in the Italian region of Valle d’Aosta, which conferred on him the title of “Amis de la Vallée d’Aoste”.

From 1998 to 2006, he was the president of Ucina (now Confindustria Nautica), a Confindustria (Confederation of Italian Industry) association grouping businesses in the Italian yachting industry. In this period he did much to boost the industry’s development, promoting the introduction of law 172/2003 and the approval of yacht leasing and other measures that have contributed to the sector’s success.

=== Politics ===
From 1974 to 2018, he was the Honorary Consul of Norway.

From March 2013 to September 2015, he was a member of the Italian parliament, elected in the Civic Choice List with Monti for Italy. He was a member of the Parliamentary Committee for the Security of the Republic (COPASIR) and the Transport and Finance Commissions.

== Death ==
Vitelli died following a fall on 31 December 2024, at the age of 77.

== Honours ==
- 1996: Cavaliere del lavoro (Order of Merit for Labour)
- 2004: Honorary degree in mechanical engineering from Politecnico di Torino
- 2006: Confindustria “Champions of growth” award as best Italian business in the five-year period 2001-2006 in terms of growth, innovation and internationalisation;
- 2011: Amis de la Vallée d’Aoste for his contribution to the development of tourism in various locations by creating quality hotels in old rural buildings.
- 2017: Carlo Riva Award for entrepreneur of the year

== Publications ==
- Vitelli, Paolo; Guadagnini, Marila; Vitelli, Giovanna (2019). Riding the wave. Mondadori Electa. ISBN 9788891826992.
