= Art Miami =

Annual modern and contemporary art fair in Miami, Florida

- Status: Active
- Genre: Art fair
- Frequency: Annual
- Venue: One Herald Plaza (since 2017)
- Locations: Miami, Florida, U.S.
- Country: United States
- Years active: 1991–present
- Inaugurated: January 1991
- Organizer: Art Miami LLC (Informa Markets, since 2019)
- Website: Official website

Art Miami is an annual modern and contemporary art fair held each December in Miami, Florida, United States. The fair was first staged in January 1991 in Miami Beach and has been described as the city’s longest‑running art fair. It takes place during Miami Art Week, typically opening with a VIP preview on the Tuesday before Art Basel Miami Beach. Since 2017, Art Miami has been held at One Herald Plaza on Biscayne Bay, the former Miami Herald site; its organizing company was acquired by Informa Markets in 2019.

== History ==
=== Founding and early years ===
The fair debuted in January 1991 in Miami Beach, aimed at South Florida collectors and winter visitors.

=== Move to December and Midtown/Wynwood (2007) ===
In April 2007, organizers announced that Art Miami would shift from its traditional January dates to early December to coincide with Art Basel Miami Beach and relocate from the Miami Beach Convention Center to a tented venue in the Midtown/Wynwood area.

=== Picasso Art Theft (2014) ===
In December 2014, a Picasso artwork valued at around $90,000 was stolen overnight. The piece, “Visage aux Mains” had been on display that Thursday night, but only an empty spot remained on the wall the following morning. This had been the first time David Smith, the owner of the Leslie Smith Gallery, had ever experienced a work being stolen. After reporting the theft to Miami police, fingerprints were dusted and surveillance footage was scanned, but there was no footage or witnesses that saw the theft or could provide any sort of personal account. While there was 24-hour security at all entrances, fair employees, cleaning crews, and booth operators all had overnight access to the site.

=== Relocation to Biscayne Bay (2017) ===
For its 2017 edition, Art Miami and its sister fair CONTEXT moved to One Herald Plaza, the former Miami Herald site on Biscayne Bay. Coverage at the time described Art Miami as the city’s longest‑running art fair; the 2017 edition hosted around 140 exhibitors.

=== Ownership change (2019) ===
In July 2019, Informa Markets acquired the Art Miami fair group, including Art Miami, CONTEXT, Aqua Art Miami, and Art Wynwood, with operations and staff retained under the new ownership.

=== 2020 pandemic and online edition ===
The 2020 in‑person editions of Art Miami, CONTEXT, and Aqua were cancelled due to the COVID‑19 pandemic, with organizers launching an online fair under the title MIAMI ART CITY during the usual early‑December dates; this reflected a wider shift toward digital programming that season.

== Sister fairs ==
CONTEXT Art Miami – a sister fair focused on emerging and mid‑career artists, launched in 2012 and held alongside Art Miami in December.

Aqua Art Miami – a boutique fair in South Beach held during Miami Art Week; part of the Art Miami group.

== See also ==
- Art Basel Miami Beach
- Miami Art Week
- Contemporary art
