= Baglietto (surname) =

Baglietto is an Italian surname. Notable people with the surname include:

- Francesco Baglietto (1826–1916), Italian physician and botanist
- Juan Carlos Baglietto (born 1956), Argentine musician
- Ramón Baglietto (1936–1980), Spanish politician

== See also ==
- Baglietto, Italian manufacturing company
