= Galkynysh =

Galkynysh from Tukmen translated as Renaissance. May also refer to:

- Galkynysh gas field, a gas field in Turkmenistan
- Galkynyş yacht, a yacht of Turkmenistan Government
- Galkynyş, a town in Turkmenistan
- Galkynyş District, a district of Lebap Province in Turkmenistan.
- Galkynysh Equestrian Group, is an equestrian ensemble from Turkmenistan that demonstrates horse riding, trick riding, and acrobatics on Akhal-Teke horses.
