= Maryanne Chisholm =

American artist

- Known for: Surrealist paintings, portraiture, Illustration
- Movement: Surrealism; Digital art Abstract art
- Website: mcartist.art

Maryanne Chisholm is a surrealist painter, illustrator and NFT artist, living in Tucson, USA.

== Artistic career ==
After more than ten years of incarceration at the Perryville Women’s Prison in Goodyear, Arizona, Chisholm began painting and developing her artistic practice. She started working in fine art after being released in 2018, and later used NFTs in 2020.

Chisholm employs symbolism to convey her emotional state, incorporating both overt and subtle motifs within surreal landscapes. She works primarily in oil on canvas, watercolor with enamel pigments, and digital painting.

She explains to Tony Paniagua how the Prison Arts Program gives women who are incarcerated inspiration and hope.

She used her art at the time to tell her narrative. Key paintings from her 5000 paintings are displayed at online websites. In order to tell a tale via art concerning justice reform and mental health, she has a dream to establish an exhibition called "While I Was Gone" that displays the 5000+ paintings, NFT's or whatever copies and originals are still available. She has launched NFT collections that were fully sold on several platforms.

Maryanne explains about Web3 in terms of gender diversity, that Web3 is also lagging behind; according to the most recent study from cryptocurrency exchange Gemini, only 26% of Web3 investors are women.

Her artwork has been shown in galleries internationally, including exhibitions in New York, Dubai, Singapore, Miami, Paris, London, Beijing, Art Basel and Miami Art Week.

== Conviction and incarceration ==
In 2005, Chisholm was convicted of white-collar offenses and sentenced to 27 years in prison. During her incarceration, another individual confessed in court to the crime for which she had been convicted. Following a successful appeal, her conviction was overturned and she was released in 2018.
