= Continuum (art fair) =

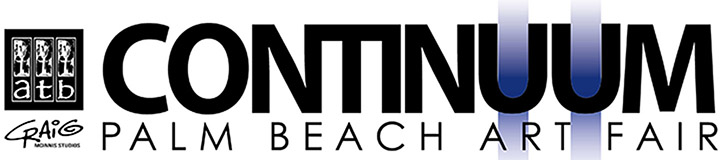
Continuum PB Art Fair

Continuum Palm Beach Art Fair is Palm Beach County satellite art fair extension created by ATB Fine Art Group Inc in partnership with Craig McInnis Studio and was sponsored by Art Palm Beach Next Level Fairs 2014-2020. Continuum was originally held annually during Art Palm Beach Week . Art Palm Beach Week's programming is believed to have attracted more than 100,000 people to Palm Beach County over the years for the last decade.

== Description ==
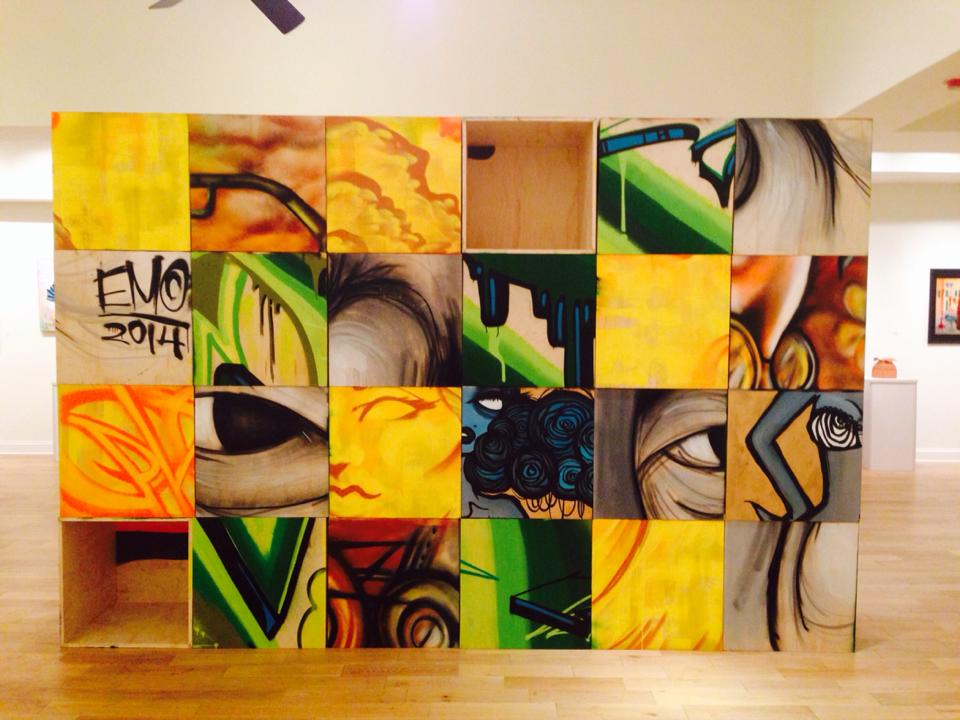
Interactive wooden sculptural mural structure

The Continuum PBC Art Fair began on January 22–26, 2014, in the historical Anthony building in downtown West Palm Beach, Florida. The Continuum was orchestrated by Trina-Slade Burks and Anthony Burks Sr. of “ATB Fine Art Group Inc ” at the nudging of business partner Craig McInnis in community partnership with Lee Ann Lester of Art Palm Beach Next Level Fairs and the Arts & Entertainment District for the City of West Palm Beach.

The mission of the art fair was to provide opportunity to professional South Florida artists to have their art acquired by international art collectors.

Continuum fostered a community partner exhibition model designed to respond to the demands of emerging collectors. The Continuum fair took a multi-faceted approach to the exhibition by using music, dance, and poetry alongside the visual experience of the art. They created an interactive wooden sculptural mural structure along the Clematis Street corridor in Downtown West Palm Beach. The fair profiled the top artists in the Southeast Florida region.

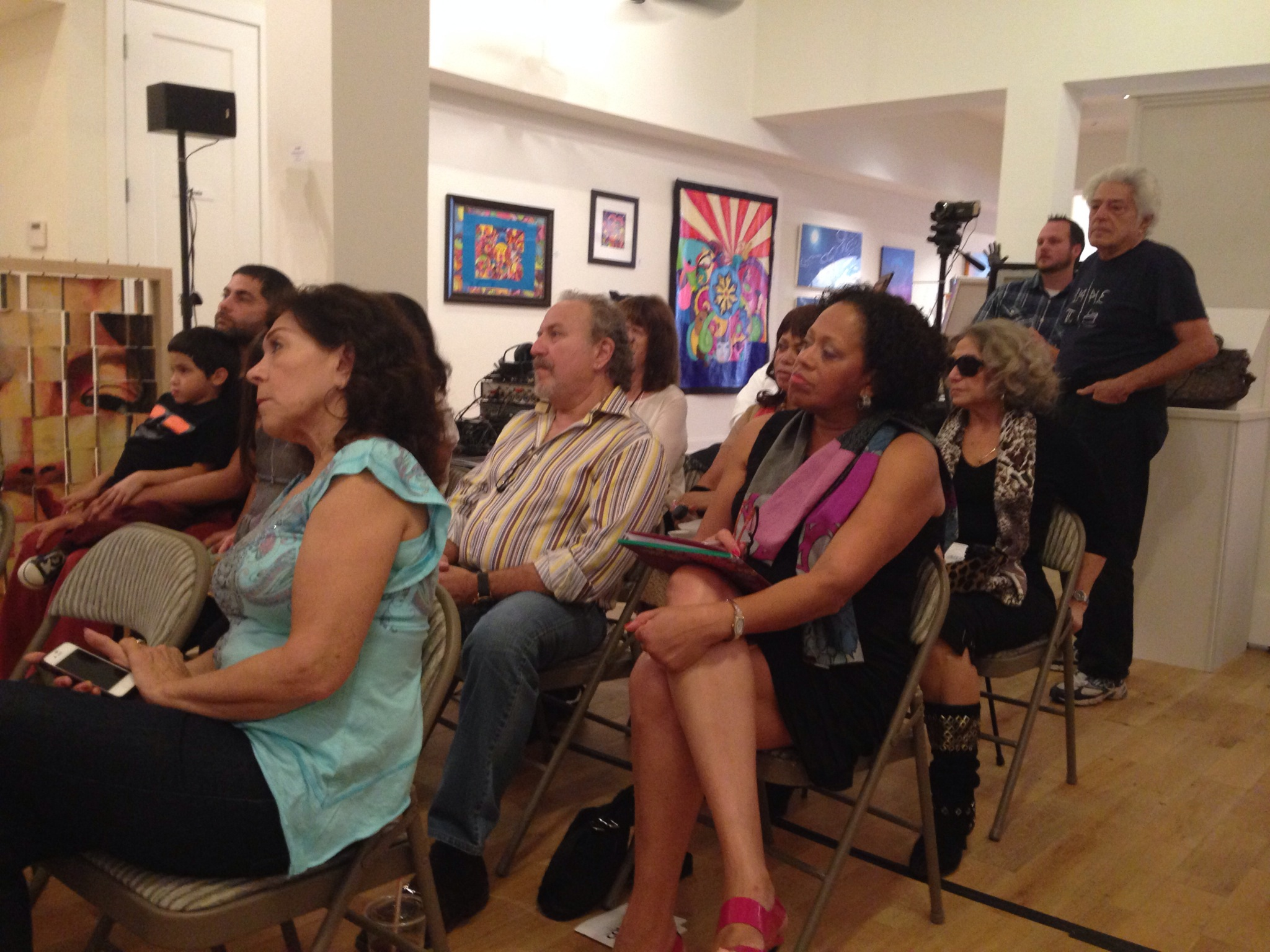
Discussion on contemporary issues in the art market

The City of West Palm Beach, in which The Continuum fair had started, has experienced a creative renaissance in recent years, particularly in the visual arts. The area is home to many of the world's top art collectors. The city continues to attract international attention and more newcomers in terms of artists, galleries and curators. In 2014, Art Palm Beach began partnering with the community in order further facilitate the growth of Palm Beach County into an international arts destination.

In 2019, Continuum WPB changed its legal branding to Continuum Palm Beach Art Fair and was acquired by the 501(c)3, the No More Starving Artists Foundation.

Over the years, the art fair has programmed this experience outside the Downtown City of West Palm Beach corridor. Locations include CityPlace (owned by Related Ross), the former Paul Fisher Gallery and the Palm Beach Art, Antique & Design Showroom, whose owners are also the current owners of Art Palm Beach.

== Exhibitors ==
- Anthony Burks Sr
- Craig McInnis
- Caron Bowman
- Jay Bellicchi
- David German
- Anthony Hernandez
- Barry Seidman
- Eduardo Mendieta
- Robert Mcknight
- Chad Steve
- Nzingah Oniwosan
- Elle Schorr
- Maria Tritico
- Scott Jeffries

== Curators ==
- Trina Slade-Burks
- Anthony Burks Sr
- Craig McInnis

== See also ==
- Art Basel
- Art Exhibitions
- Art Palm Beach
