= Bridget Finn =

American art dealer and gallerist

Bridget Finn is an American art dealer and gallerist who has served as the director of Art Basel Miami Beach since 2023. She is the first director of Art Basel Miami Beach to have herself been an exhibitor.

== Career ==
Finn earned a B.F.A. from the College for Creative Studies in 2005. She then worked at the Anton Kern gallery in New York. From 2010 to 2013, she was director of strategic planning and projects at Independent Curators International. For four years, Finn was the director of contemporary programming at Mitchell-Innes & Nash. In October 2017, she joined Reyes Projects, a gallery in Birmingham, Michigan as its managing director.

In July 2023, Finn was selected as the incoming director of Art Basel Miami Beach. She began the role in September of that year, with Art Basel Miami Beach 2024 being her first fair that she organized. Finn says that the galleries remain the heart of the fair, focusing on "modern-art presentations."

== Personal life ==
Finn was raised in Grosse Pointe, Michigan. As of 2025, she is a New York resident.

In 2020, Finn and musician Sam Beaubien had a daughter while living in Lafayette Park, Detroit. They returned to Grosse Pointe in December that year. Their daughter was diagnosed with a STXBP1 disorder on November 15, 2021. On Rare Disease Day in 2022, they launched Flourish, a fundraising platform for the STXBP1 Foundation on Rare Disease Day. The same year, Flourish partnered with Christie's in New York to host an art auction fundraiser.
