= Anthony Burks Sr =

American artist (born 1967)

Anthony Burks SR
- Born: Anthony Laroy Burks; December 18, 1967 (age 58); Lake Worth Beach, FL
- Spouse: Trina Slade-Burks
- Children: Anthony Burks Jr., Raymond Burks
- Awards: Artist Innovation Fellowship
- Website: Official website

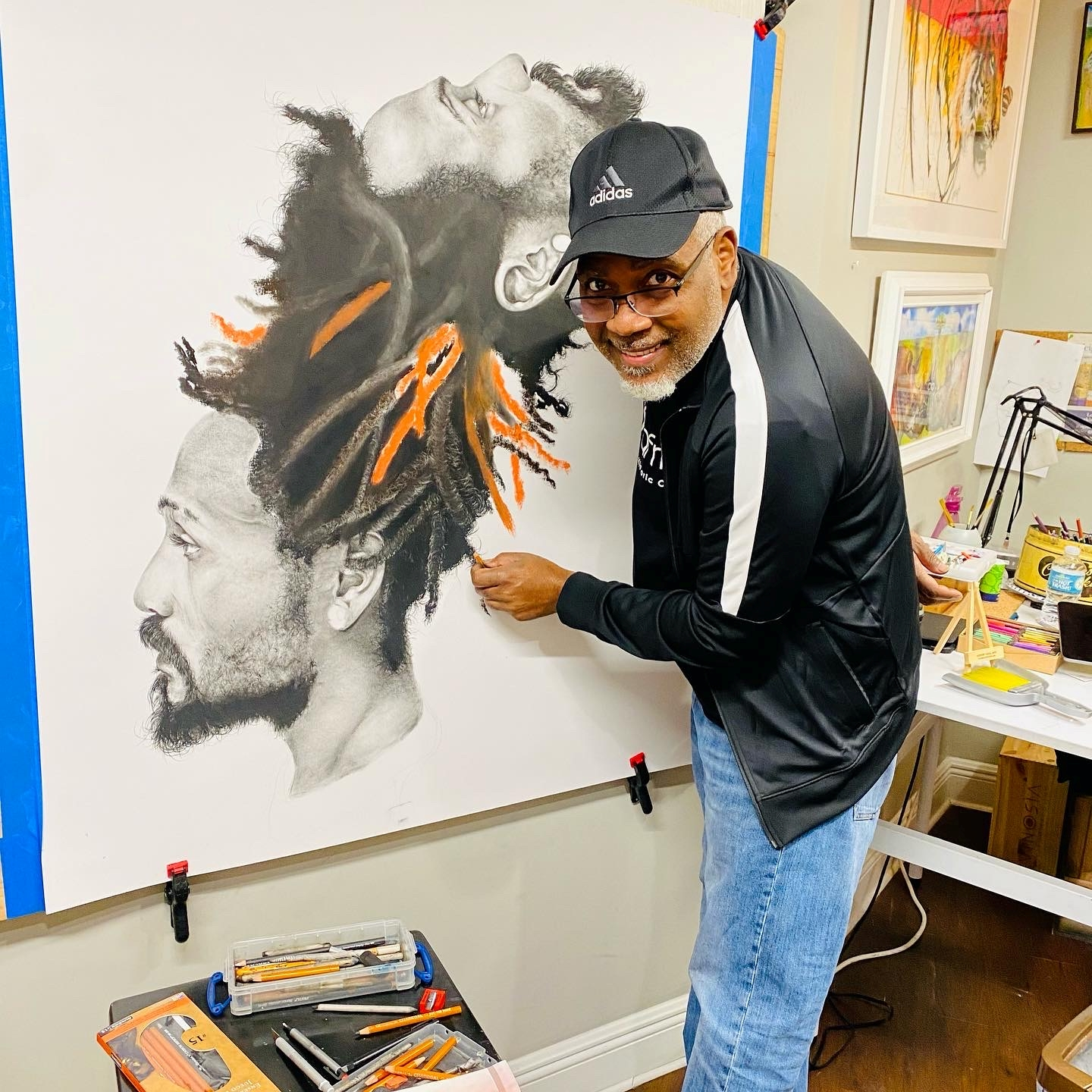
Anthony Burks creating a piece for the series ONE LOVE in his former studio Zero Empty Spaces.

Anthony Laroy Burks Sr. (December 18, 1967) is an African-American conceptual fine and commercial artist, curator and art educator. He is a graduate of the Art Institute of Fort Lauderdale where he met his business partner and current wife Trina Slade-Burks. Together in 1992, they established an art-based consulting firm named ATB Fine Art Group Inc. that creates, sells, promotes and educates art of different disciplines nationally.

Burks has exhibited his artwork at various galleries, museums and cultural events. He uses his artistic experience and expertise to encourage emerging artists, youth and adults to pursue their creative talents and to promote greater engagement with the arts.

== Early life ==
Burks was born on December 18, 1967, in Lake Worth Beach, Florida, the son of Jimmy Cal Burks, an auto mechanic from Miami, Florida and Florence Louise Burks, a school bus driver with Palm Beach County School District from the community of Pleasant City in West Palm Beach, Florida. He is African American of Bahamian descent and the third child of five. Burks grew up in both the Pleasant City community as well as in the City of Riviera Beach. He earned his Associate of Science degree in Visual Communication from the Art Institute of Fort Lauderdale. Burks worked in the sign industry for 23 years before being laid off amid the 2008 financial crisis. That was the start of his career as a full-time, self-employed artist.

== Art career ==
Burks has co-curated several exhibitions, including Continuum PB Arts Fair, Collaboration: African Diaspora Exhibition, How Do We Move Forward, Karibu, and Boys II Men Art Expo. These exhibitions have provided opportunities for emerging, mid-career and established artists to showcase their work and connect with collectors and audiences who may not otherwise have encountered their art.

In early 2020, the Cultural Council for Palm Beach County selected Burks as one of five recipients of an Artist Innovation Fellowship. The fellowship funding helped support the purchase of art materials, framing, the acquisition of a studio space and the production of his first coffee table book documenting two series he developed, Natural Beauty and ONE LOVE.

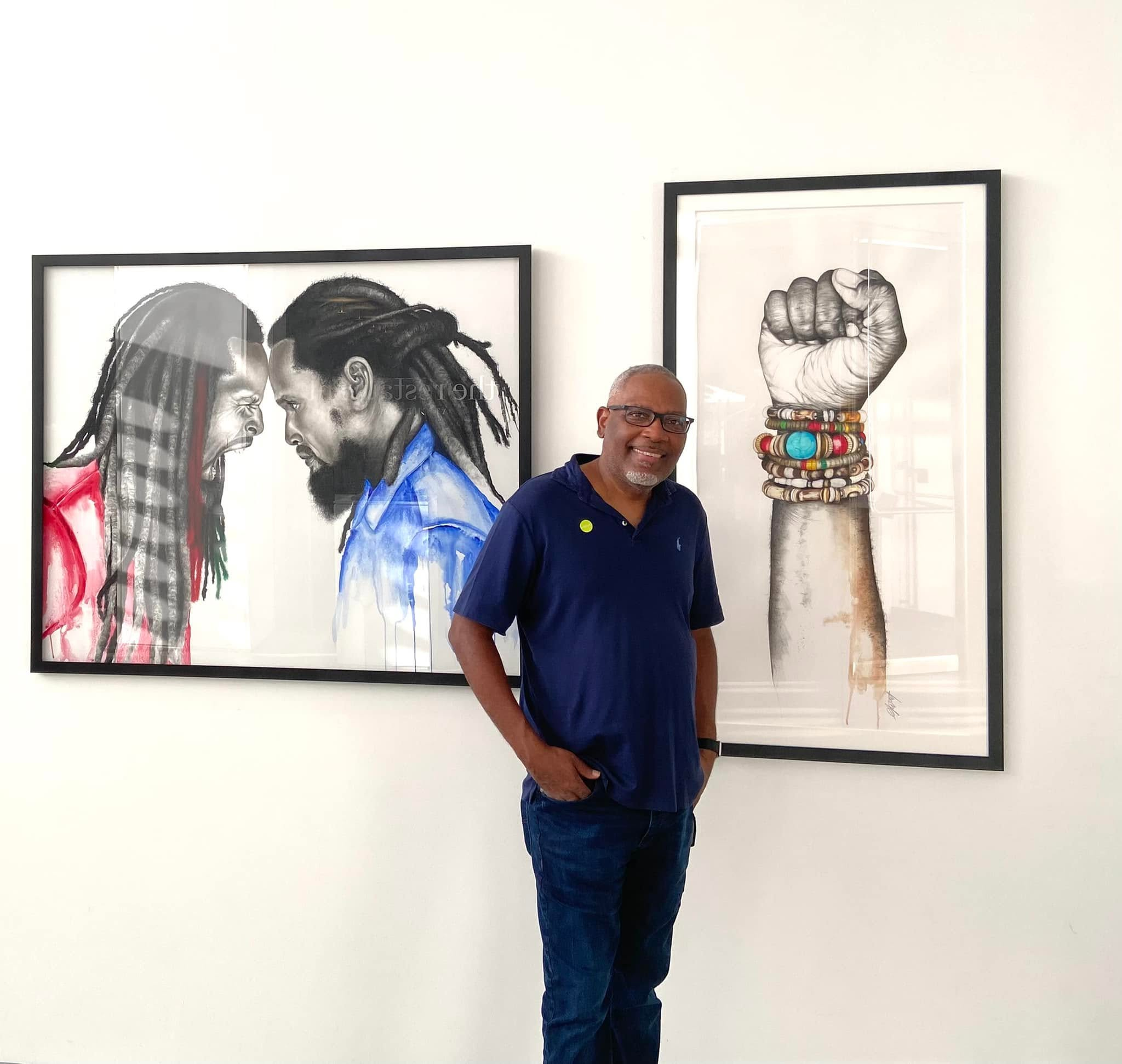
Anthony Burks standing with his art pieces acquired by the Norton Museum of Art.

June 19, 2021, the Norton Museum of Art acquired two of Burks's works, Mirror Black and Juneteenth, for inclusion in the R. H. Norton Permanent Collection.

Burks was part of a 4-person exhibition entitled Soul Finger Project. Hosted at Portsmouth Art & Cultural Center in 2022, featured paintings and drawings influenced by contemporary Black Culture that traces its roots to Northern Africa and the Caribbean. Participating artists included the curator, Portsmouth, Virginia native and currently a Florida resident, Ramel Jasir, Arthur Rogers, Jr. from Charlotte, North Carolina and Clayton Singleton from Norfolk, Virginia. "Each artist brings their own unique style or 'fingerprint' that differs yet compliments the work made by other artists featured in the exhibition."

In 2024, the Business for the Arts of Broward rented a body of Burks's artwork to exhibit in their business. That opened up another opportunity with Pompano Beach Arts who in 2025 rented over 30 pieces of his art to be exhibited at both the Bailey Contemporary Arts (BaCA) gallery and the Pompano Beach Cultural Center gallery.

He also moved into a new studio at the artist collective, The Peach. Burks is currently working on a virtual exhibition program with current and future private collectors around the country called Aya; and along with his studio mate Erica Kyle, has produced an exclusive event called Arte & Aperitivo which is an unveiling of the newest work they created for their collectors.

His has exhibited at The Benzaiten Center for Creative Arts in Lake Worth Beach.

Burks is represented by Golden Galleries LLC and his work has been licensed to be used in a couple of Tyler Perry productions. Four images of his work appear on the set of television show All the Queen's Men.
