= Baglietto =

Coordinates: 44.0934428°N 9.863907°E

- Company type: Subsidiary
- Industry: Shipbuilding
- Founded: 1854; 171 years ago
- Founder: Pietro Baglietto
- Headquarters: La Spezia, Italy
- Area served: Worldwide
- Key people: Beniamo Gavio (President)
- Products: Superyachts
- Website: baglietto.com

Baglietto are superyacht builders of La Spezia, Italy. They build yachts 100 ft and longer. It was founded in 1854.

== Products ==
- Litoraneo class patrol boat for Guardia di Finanza c. 1950s; 3 transferred to Maritime Squadron of the Armed Forces of Malta in 1992

== See also ==
- Azimut Yachts
- Benetti
- Codecasa
- Fincantieri
- Rossinavi
- Sanlorenzo
- List of Italian companies
- Baglietto (surname)
