= Sokar (yacht) =

Luxury yacht

Isabell Princess Of The Sea
History
- Name: 1990–1997: Jonikal; 1997–2021: Sokar; 2021–2023: Bash; 2023–onwards: "Isabell Princess Of The Sea"
- Namesake: Isabell Princess Of The Sea
- Port of registry: 1990–2002: Hamilton, Bermuda; 2002–2005: United Kingdom; 2005–2021: Hamilton, Bermuda; 2021 onwards: Gibraltar, Gibraltar
- Builder: Codecasa
- Yard number: F51
- Laid down: 21 September 1988
- Launched: 1990
- Completed: 1 June 1990
- In service: 1 June 1990
- Identification: IMO number: 8963997; Call sign: ZDRX3; MMSI number: 236738000
- Status: In service

General characteristics
- Type: Luxury yacht
- Tonnage: 937 GT
- Length: 208 ft 3 in (63.47 m)
- Beam: 10.4 m (34 ft)
- Draft: 3.9 m (13 ft)
- Installed power: 2 × 3,760 hp (2,800 kW) Wärtsilä engines
- Propulsion: Twin propellers
- Speed: 18 knots (33 km/h; 21 mph)

Isabell Princess Of The Sea (originally named Jonikal, then Sokar and Bash) is a luxury yacht formerly owned by Egyptian businessman Mohamed Al-Fayed, the former owner of Harrods department store in Knightsbridge. The vessel was sold in 2014 after being on the market for many years. Until July 2021 she was named after the Egyptian mythology falcon god Sokar. She was renamed Bash on 15 July 2021.

The yacht was designed by naval architect Vincenzo Ruggiero in the late 1980s and built by Codecasa in Italy and launched in 1990. She has a length of 208 feet 3 inches (63.47 m) making her the 89th largest yacht in the world in 2007. She is equipped with two 3,760 horsepower (2,800 kW) engines. The yacht has a beam of 10.4 metres (34 ft) and a draft of 3.9 metres (13 ft).

Al-Fayed has often kept the yacht moored in the harbour of Monaco since the 1990s but she is registered in Bermuda and flies the Flag of Bermuda. In August 1997 Mohamed's son Dodi Fayed and Diana, Princess of Wales were extensively photographed on the yacht shortly before their deaths in Paris.

Yachting Partners International attempted to buy the yacht on numerous occasions, offering $32 million and $30 million for the yacht in 2005. In 2001 Al-Fayed had also attempted to sell the yacht for a reported $40 million. After years on the market and numerous price reductions, she was finally sold in 2014 to an unknown buyer for under $13 million.

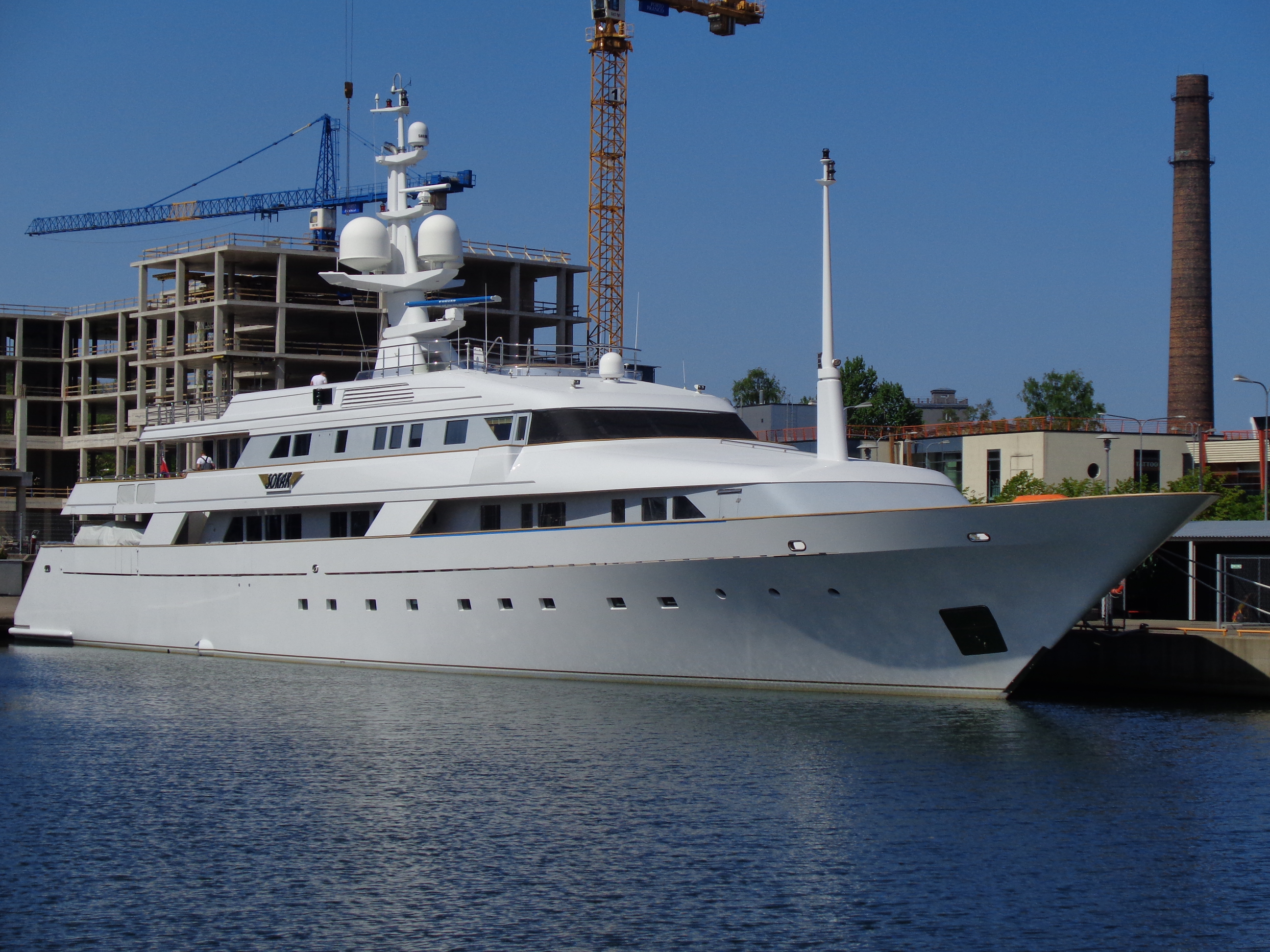
Sokar moored at quay 22 in Port of Tallinn 24 May 2021
