= Sanlorenzo S.p.a. =

Italian shipbuilding company

Coordinates: 43.9803426°N 9.9104111°E

Sanlorenzo S.p.A.
- Type: Società per azioni
- Traded as: FTSE Italia Mid Cap: SL
- Industry: Shipbuilding
- Founded: 1958; 68 years ago
- Founder: Gianfranco Cecchi & Giuliano Pecchia
- Headquarters: La Spezia, Ameglia, Italy
- Area served: Worldwide
- Key people: Massimo Perotti (Chairman)
- Products: GRP Motoryachts; 24 to 70 metres (79 to 230 ft); Superyachts; 40 to 70 metres (130 to 230 ft)
- Revenue: €740.7 million (2022)
- Number of employees: 450 (Direct); 1,000 (Subcontractors)
- Divisions: Sanlorenzo Yacht; Sanlorenzo Superyacht
- Website: www.sanlorenzoyacht.com

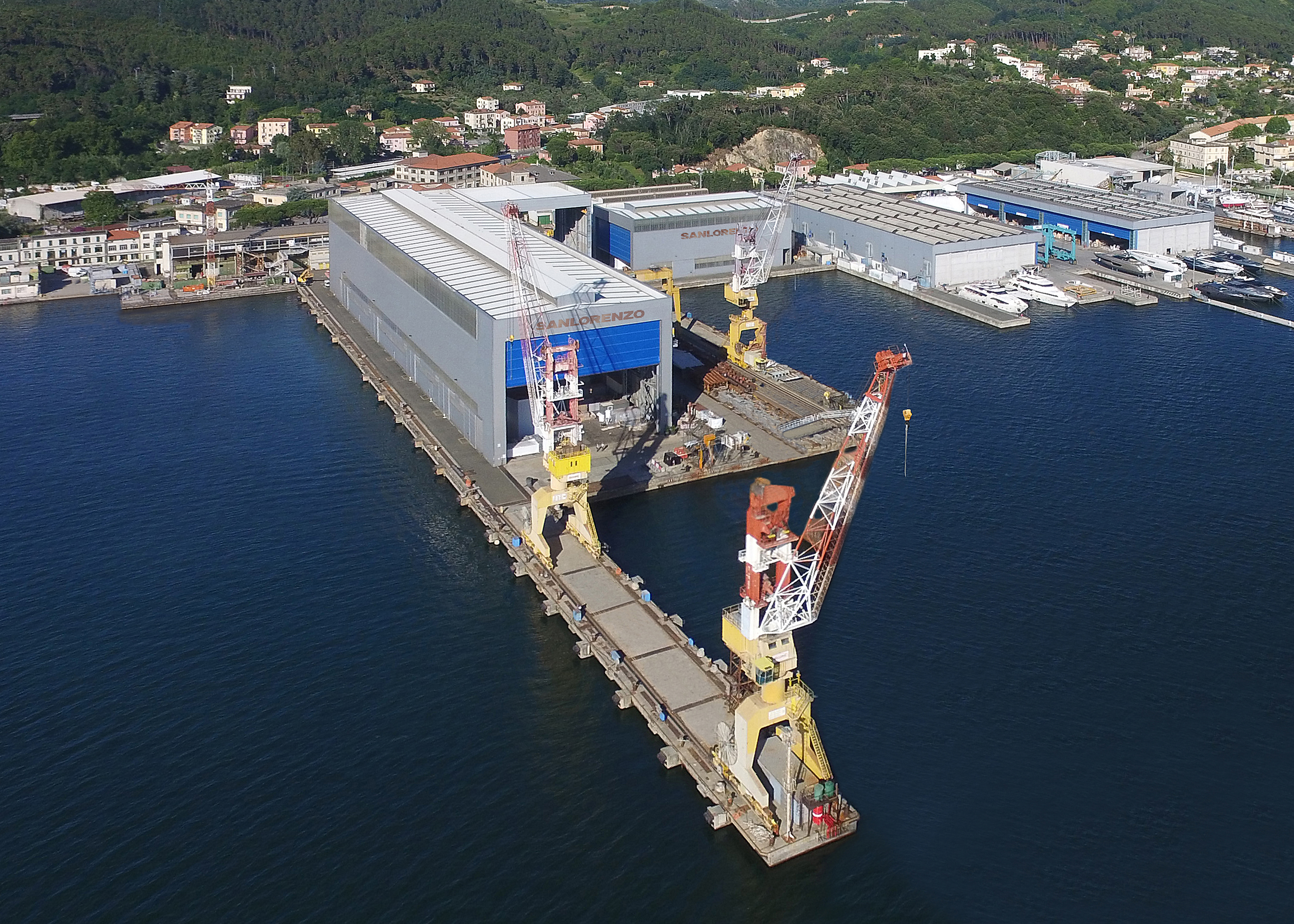

Sanlorenzo S.p.A. (or Sanlorenzo) is an Italian shipbuilding specialised in the production of luxury yachts and superyachts, from 24 to 70 meters in length, whose headquarters is based in Ameglia, province of La Spezia. For over 60 years, Sanlorenzo has been operating in the yachting industry by building a limited number of made-to-measure boats a year.

Founded in 1958 by Gianfranco Cecchi and Giuliano Pecchia who opened the first shipyard near Florence, Sanlorenzo was taken over in 1972 by Giovanni Jannetti who launched the first fiberglass hull boat in 1985 and moved the headquarters to Ameglia (SP) in 1999. In 2005, Massimo Perotti, the actual Executive Chairman, took the baton.

Based in Italy with four production plants in Ameglia, La Spezia, Viareggio and Massa, it operates worldwide through its brand representatives.

2020 Global Order Book by Boat International, published on 17 December 2019, places Sanlorenzo on the second place worldwide, appointing the company as "the most prolific single-brand builder in the world", given its 87 projects in 2019, up by 13% over 2018.

Sanlorenzo Group employs in July 2020 approximately 500 people and cooperates with a network of 1.500 qualified craft enterprises and artisans.

== History ==
=== Foundation and development ===
Sanlorenzo was founded in 1958 by Gianfranco Cecchi and Giuliano Pecchia in Limite sull'Arno, near Florence, a small city known worldwide as the cradle of Italian shipbuilding. In 1972 Giovanni Jannetti takes over the company and opens the Viareggio shipyard. Under the leadership of Jannetti, Sanlorenzo becomes one of the most representative Italian yachting brands. In 1985 the Company, whose name was Cantieri Navali Sanlorenzo, launches the first fiberglass yacht - the SL57 model. In 1995 Sanlorenzo enters another era with the creation of the superyacht sector, with the launch of the first SL100 model.

In 1999 Sanlorenzo moves its operations in Ameglia (SP) and acquires ISO 14001 certification that proves that the production of Sanlorenzo meets requirements of management systems and production processes that protect the environment.

=== Sanlorenzo under the new management ===
2005 sees Massimo Perotti, actual Executive Chairman, acquiring the majority shareholding of Cantieri Navali Sanlorenzo Spa from Giovanni Jannetti and renaming the company Sanlorenzo Spa, as it is called today.

In 2007 Viareggio shipyard opens with the purpose of hosting the production of fiberglass yachts with a length of over 30 meters. The same year also sees the launch of the SD92 and the 40Alloy yachts, both awarded at the Show Boat Design Awards and World Superyacht Awards.

In 2010 Sanlorenzo launches 46Steel, the first displacement superyacht made of steel, and in 2011 SL94 is born, a boat that wins the "Boat of the Year" award. It is 2011 that sees Sanlorenzo for the first time, ranking third worldwide among shipyards producing yachts over 24 meters.

Sanlorenzo launches in 2013 the SL118, a yacht that became the flagship of Sanlorenzo's fiberglass range, while 2015 sees the launch of the 460Exp and the SL86.

In 2016 came the decision to purchase the production site at La Spezia, home of Sanlorenzo Superyachts, and the opening of a research and development center for the creation of new models in Massa.

2018 sees Bluegame, specialising in design and production of sport utility yacht, entering Sanlorenzo Group shareholdings.

2019 is the year that sees Sanlorenzo quoted in Milan Stock Exchange STAR Segment.

== Shipyards ==
Sanlorenzo has four different construction sites located between Tuscany and Liguria, in La Spezia, Ameglia, Massa and Viareggio. The sites are strategically located near to each other, so allowing significant operational efficiencies.

Ameglia (SP) the company headquarters and site for the production of medium and large size yachts.

La Spezia (SP) shipyard for the production of superyachts.

Viareggio (LU) shipyard for the production of fiberglass motoryachts over 100 feet.

Massa (MS) shipyard operates as center for study and development of new models.

== Range ==
Sanlorenzo offers six different ranges between yachts and superyachts and sport utility yachts, with lengths between 24 and 70 meters.

=== YACHTS – 24 to 38 meters yachts in composite material ===
2019 Net Revenue: 63.6%

SL line – planing yachts flees that includes six models (SL78, SL86, SL96Asymmetric, SL102Asymmetric, SL106, SL118) from 24 to 37 meters.

SD line - semi-displacement yachts range including three models (SD96, SD112 and SD126) from 28 to 38 meters in length

SX line – crossover yachts fleet, launched by Sanlorenzo in 2017, based on a synthesis between the flying bridge motoryacht and the explorer type. It includes three models SX76, SX88 and SX112

=== SUPERYACHTS – 40 to 70 meters aluminium and steel superyachts ===
2019 Net Revenue: 32.9%

Alloy Range - superyachts entirely made in aluminium with a fast displacement hull. This iconic line by Sanlorenzo was the first to introduce the terraces that can be opened to the sea.

Steel Range - superyachts made with metal hulls featuring large internal spaces and innovative solutions

Explorer Range – launched in 2015 it includes expedition superyachts with displacement steel hull and aluminum superstructure

=== BLUEGAME ===
2019 Net Revenue: 3.5%

The Bluegame Division, introduced in 2018, is dedicated to the production of Sport Utility Yachts with a length between 13 and 21 meters

== International presence ==
Sanlorenzo Spa leverages on an international distribution network and a widespread service network for customers worldwide. It operates through brand representatives, that act as ambassadors of Sanlorenzo in the world, specifically positioned in key locations for the international yachting scene and directly managed by the mother company. The world has been divided into three main areas: EMEA, AMERICAS, APAC.

== Financial highlights ==
2019 Net Revenue

Sanlorenzo Europe 61.3%

Sanlorenzo Americas 15.8%

Sanlorenzo MEA 6.9%

Sanlorenzo APAC 16%

== Sanlorenzo & Design ==
Sanlorenzo has been the first company in the yachting sector to involve outstanding names in international design in the creation of yacht interiors, including Dordoni Architetti, Antonio Citterio, Patricia Viel, Piero Lissoni, Patricia Urquiola, John Pawson and Christian Liaigre. Thanks to their collaboration, the company has introduced stylistic innovations that have made it possible to reinterpret the concept of on-board space.

In 2018, Sanlorenzo starts the collaboration with Piero Lissoni as the company's art director.

== Sanlorenzo & Art ==
Over the years, Sanlorenzo has bond with the art world activating a series of collaborations with international art galleries and cultural institutions like the Milan Triennale, during the FuoriSalone in 2017 and 2018, and with Tornabuoni Arte, with which the company has organised exhibitions on its yachts, during Art Basel Miami Beach in 2016 and the 57th Venice Art Biennale.

in 2018 Sanlorenzo formed a global partnership agreement with Art Basel, the world's leading art fair for modern and contemporary art, for the annual appointments in Hong Kong in March, Basel in June and Miami Beach in December.

In 2020, Sanlorenzo launches a long-term collaboration with the Peggy Guggenheim Collection in Venice, the most important museum in Italy for European and American 20th-century art.

Sanlorenzo becomes the Institutional Patron of the museum, at the highest level of partnership with the corporate world.

== Sanlorenzo Academy ==
The Sanlorenzo Academy is the specialized training center born in 2018 within the group with the aim of creating and developing highly qualified professional skills. A unique in the luxury yachting sector, the academy conducts training activities for the benefit of the artisan companies with which the company collaborates, partners and employees who contribute to the construction of Sanlorenzo yachts.

== Collaborations ==
- Antonio Citterio & Patricia Viel
- Dordoni Architetti
- Francesco Paszkowski
- Laura Sessa
- Officina Italiana Design
- Patricia Urquiola
- Piero Lissoni
- Zuccon International Project

== Awards ==
2008

ShowBoats Design Award by ShowBoats International to 40Alloy

2009

World Superyacht Awards by Boat International to 40Alloy

2010

Show Boats Design Award by Show Boats International to SL106

World Superyacht Awards by Boat International to SD126

La Belle Classe: Innovation & Environment By Yacht Club de Monaco to Massimo Perotti

2011 Barca dell’Anno by Vela e Motore to SL96

Premio Nazionale per l’Innovazione By ADI to SL106

2012

ShowBoats Design Award by ShowBoats International to SL96

Environmental Award by Union Internationale Motonautique to SL96

2013

China Award By Fondazione Italia-Cina to Sanlorenzo Spa

2016

World Yachts Trophies by Yachts France to SL78

World Superyacht Awards by Boat International to 460Exp

Personality of the Year by World Yacht Trophy Judging Panel to Mr Massimo Perotti

2017

Asia Boating Award by Asia Pacific Boating to 460Exp

World Yachts Trophies by Yachts France to SX88 and 52Steel

World Superyacht Awards by Boat International to 460Exp Interior Design

2018

World Yachts Trophies by Yachts France to SL102 and 500Exp Helipad

World Superyacht Awards by Boat International to 52Steel

Asia Boating Award by Asia Pacific Boating to 52Steel

2019

Asia Boating Awards - Sanlorenzo 500Exp Best Explorer Yacht

World yacht Trophies to Sanlorenzo Attila - Best Interior Design Trophy & to Sanlorenzo SD96 - Best Layout Trophy

Montecarlo Yachting Show - 64Steel Attila MYS/RINA Award

== See also ==
- Azimut Yachts
- Baglietto
- Benetti
- Codecasa
- Fincantieri
- Rossinavi
- List of Italian companies
