= High Power III =

2011 luxury motor yacht by Rossinavi

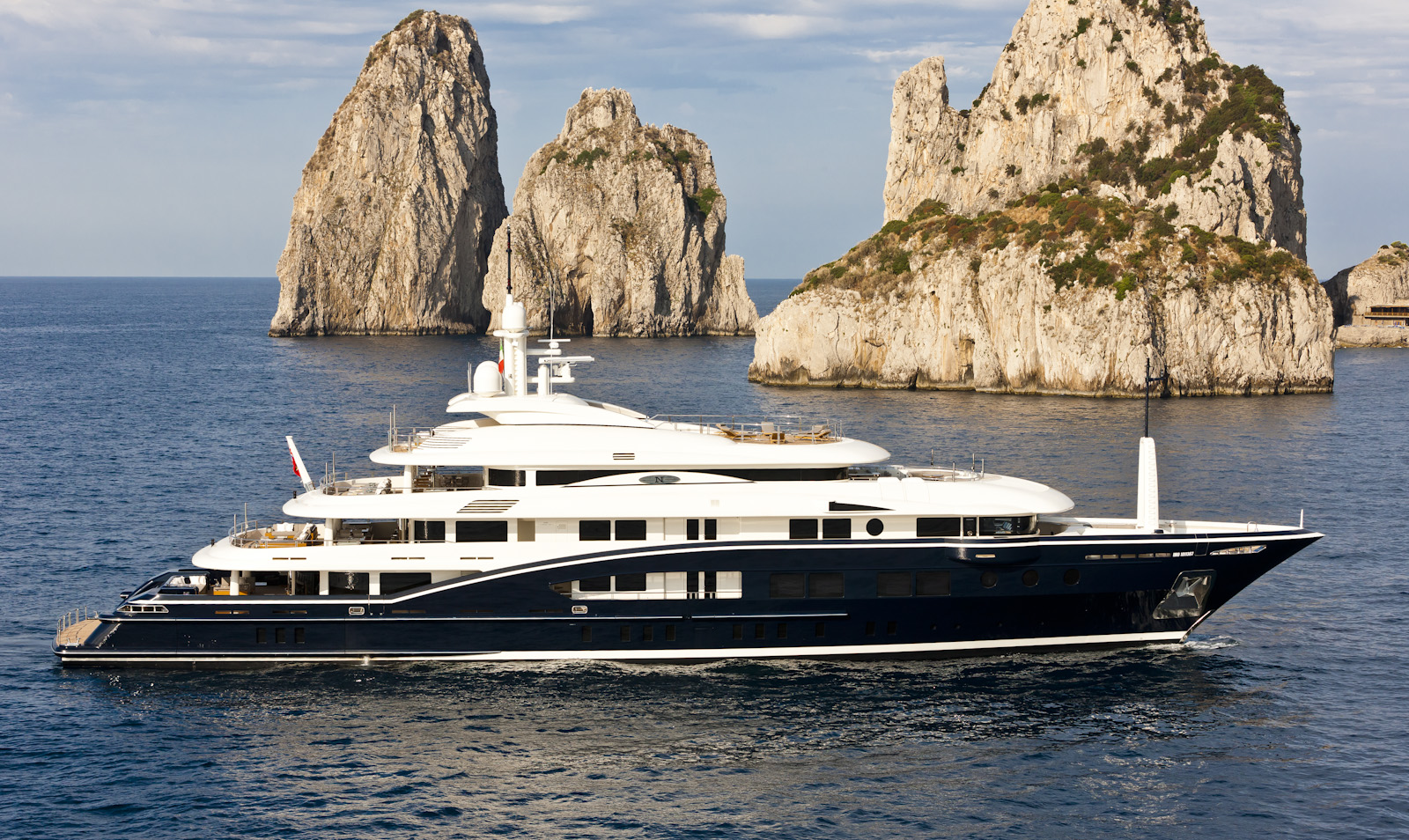
- High Power III near Capri

History
- Name: Numptia
- Ordered: 2008
- Builder: Rossinavi
- Yard number: FR020
- Launched: 20 April 2011
- Completed: July 2011
- Renamed: Summer 2012
- Name: High Power III
- Port of registry: Cayman Islands
- Acquired: Summer 2012
- Homeport: George Town, Cayman Islands
- Identification: IMO number: 1011367; MMSI number: 319216000; Callsign: ZGCM6
- Status: in active service

General characteristics
- Type: Luxury yacht
- Tonnage: 1,642 GT
- Length: 70 metres (230 ft) overall
- Beam: 13.2 metres (43 ft)
- Draught: 3.4 metres (11 ft) calculated
- Decks: 5
- Installed power: Two Caterpillar 3516B Diesel engines 2,525 kW each at 1,800 RPM
- Propulsion: Twin screw
- Speed: 18.6 knots (34.4 km/h; 21.4 mph) (maximum); 16 knots (30 km/h; 18 mph) (cruising at half load)
- Range: 7,500 nautical miles (13,900 km; 8,600 mi) at 12 knots (22 km/h; 14 mph)
- Capacity: 12 guests
- Crew: 19
- Notes: Data from SuperYachtTimes.com

High Power III is a luxury motor yacht built by the Italian shipyard Rossinavi. 70 metres (230 feet) long, High Power III was built in Viareggio, home to several international yacht builders. The exterior design is by Studio Spadolini of Florence, the interior by Salvagni Architetti of Rome. while naval architecture was by Axis Group Yacht Design.

== History ==
Originally named the Numptia when construction began in 2008, she was delivered in July 2011. Numptia took part in the 2011 Monaco Yacht Show. and in Autumn 2011, sailed for the Caribbean where she was made available for charter. In the summer of 2012, Numptia was sold to a Swiss businessman, and her name changed to High Power III.

== General characteristics ==
The yacht has a displacement type steel hull with aluminum superstructure.

== Awards ==
- Showboats Design Awards 2012 Bespoke Furniture Award for the main dining table
- Showboats Design Awards 2012 Naval Architecture Award
- World Superyacht Awards 2012 Judges' Special Award for the Interior Design with the Widest Appeal
- RINA Green Plus 2011
