= Codecasa =

Italian luxury super yacht building firm

Coordinates: 43.8634276°N 10.2369666°E

- Industry: Shipbuilding
- Founded: 1825; 201 years ago in Viareggio, Italy
- Founder: Giovanni Battista Codecasa
- Headquarters: Viareggio, Italy
- Area served: Worldwide
- Products: Yachts
- Website: codecasayachts.com

Codecasa is an Italian luxury super yacht building firm, founded in Viareggio by Giovanni Battista Codecasa in 1825.

== History ==
The shipyard Codecasa was created by Giovanni Battista Codecasa in 1825.

Today, under the direction of the sixth generation Codecasa, the company works with a custom policy, which aims to build the yacht according to the owner's needs. In January 2020 the Shipyards will launch a new project: the construction of jets 2020. It will be a 70-meter yacht, with a unique design of its kind because it borrows the aviation lines with the result of looking like an airplane resting on the sea. This project should be completed within the year and is destined to become the new flagship of the Codecasa Shipyards.

The Codecasa family still maintains this family business.

In 2010, Codecasa launched the superyacht Lady Lau.

== Activities ==
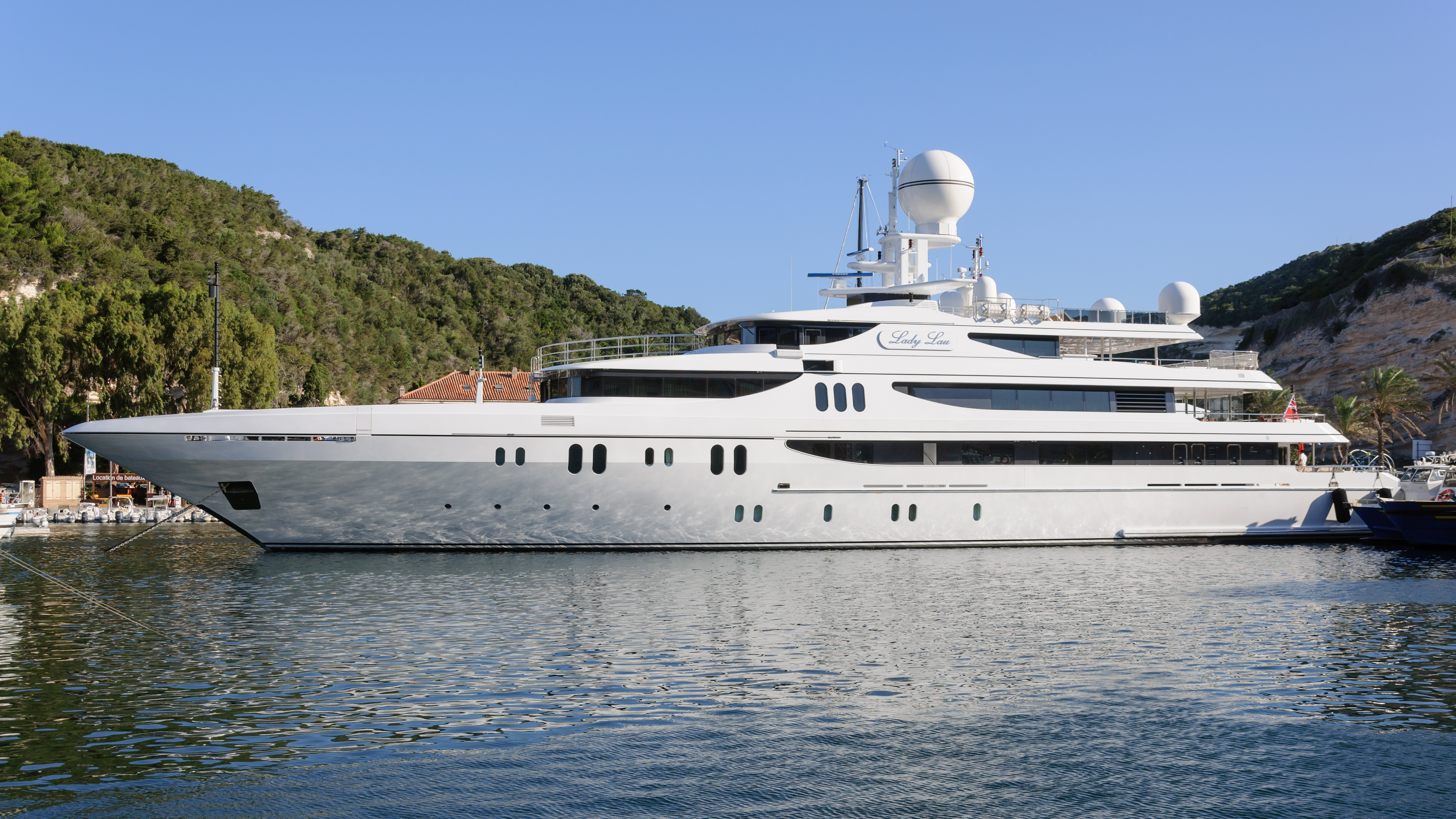
The superyacht M/Y Lady Lau built in 2010 at Codecasa shipyard in Viareggio

The company possesses a shipyard which allows them to build steel/aluminium or entirely aluminium vessels between 30 and 90 m (98 and 295 ft) in length. The shipyard is situated in one of the port of Viareggio's oldest docks, covering an area in excess of 6500 square meters. The shipyard is also equipped with repairing and refitting of motor and sailing yachts.

The company is responsible for many luxury yachts around the Mediterranean Sea. Former clients include billionaires such as Mohammed Al-Fayed who bought his yacht the Sokar, originally built in 1990 as the Jonikal, in the spring of 1997. It has a length of 208 feet (63.5 m) making it the 89th largest yacht in the world in 2007.

Codecasa Yachts was awarded “Best Design” in the large motor yacht category by Yachts Magazine for their 164-foot range of yachts.

== Famous yachts ==
- The Invader, 163.7-foot, owned by media mogul Jim Gabbert
- The Apogee, 205-foot, owned by Darwin Deason
- The Main, 213-foot, owned by Giorgio Armani

== See also ==
- Azimut Yachts
- Baglietto
- Benetti
- Fincantieri
- Rossinavi
- Sanlorenzo
- List of Italian companies
