= Ramón Baglietto =

Spanish politician, councillor (1937 - 1980)

Ramón Baglietto Martínez (Bilbao, 1937 - Azcoitia, 1980) was a Spanish politician, councillor of UCD in the municipality of Azcoitia (Guipúzcoa), who was killed by the terrorist organization ETA on 12 May 1980.

== Biography ==
Born in Bilbao on 5 January 1937, Ramón Baglietto was a member of Unión de Centro Democrático, and rose to the position of deputy mayor. Baglietto also owned a furniture store in Elgóibar. At the time of his murder, he had two children aged 9 and 13, and he also was city councillor of Azcoitia as was his sister, Nieves.

On 12 May 1980 he was leaving Elgóibar in his Seat 127 when a Seat 131, occupied by Kándido Azpiazu Beristain and José Ignacio Zuazolazigorraga Larrañaga, pulled up next to him, and the two shot him with a machine gun and a pistol. Ramon's vehicle crashed and became embedded in a tree, and Azpiazu got out of the Seat 131 and killed Baglietto with a shot in the head. The terrorists fled and abandoned the vehicle, but the two murderers, along with three other individuals, were arrested days later by the security forces.

Kándido Azpiazu was sentenced to 49 years and two months in prison, but in 1990 was granted parole. Azpiazu bought a store and set up a glassware shop in the basement of the Azcoitia building where the widow and the two sons of Baglietto were currently living.

The widow of Baglietto, Pilar Elías, joined the People's party lists for the municipal elections, and was a councillor in the municipality of Azcoitia from 1995 until 2011. Ramon's sister, Nieves Baglietto, left the Basque Country after receiving threats from violent groups.

== Bibliography ==
- MERINO, A., CHAPA, A., Raíces de Libertad. pp. 47–57. FPEV (2011). ISBN 978-84-615-0648-4
