= Kingdom 5KR =

Motor yacht built by Benetti

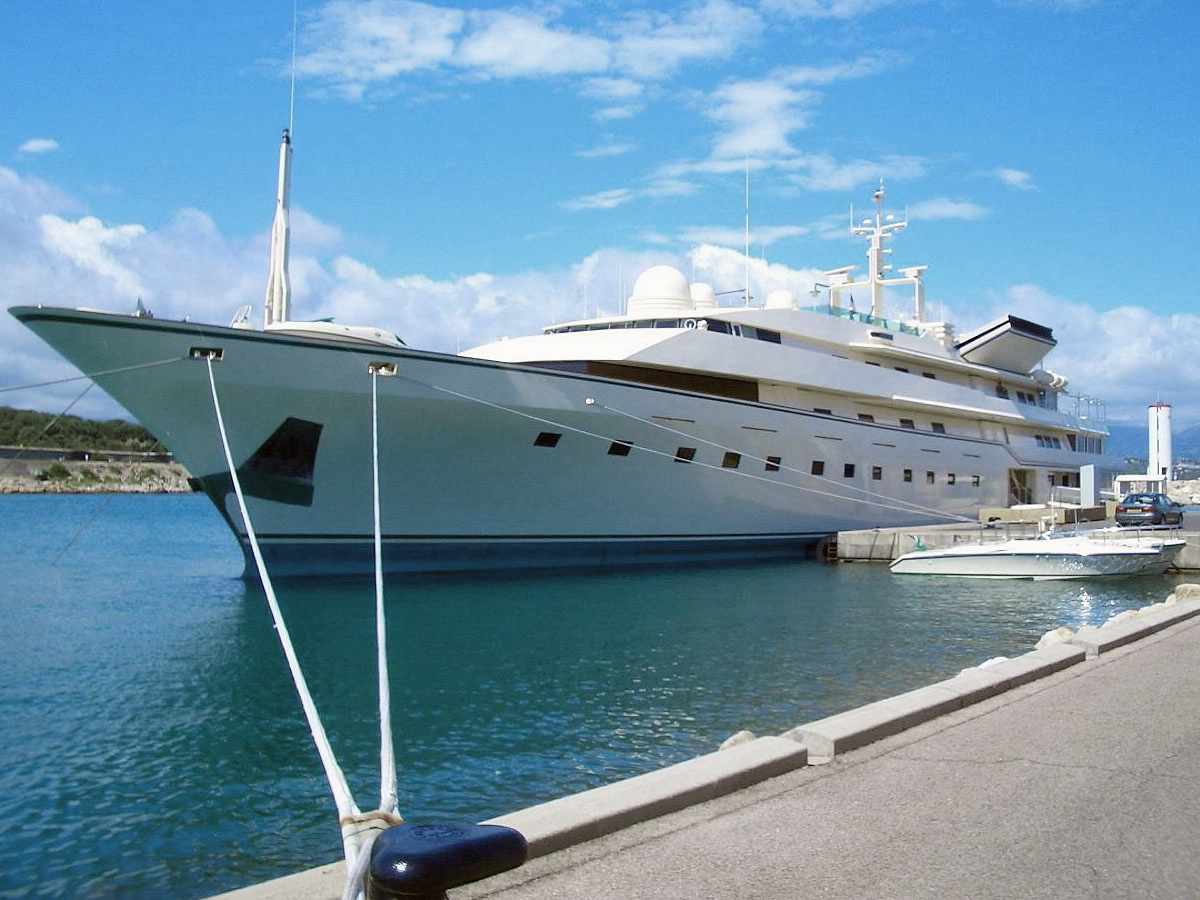
Kingdom 5KR, docked in Antibes, France

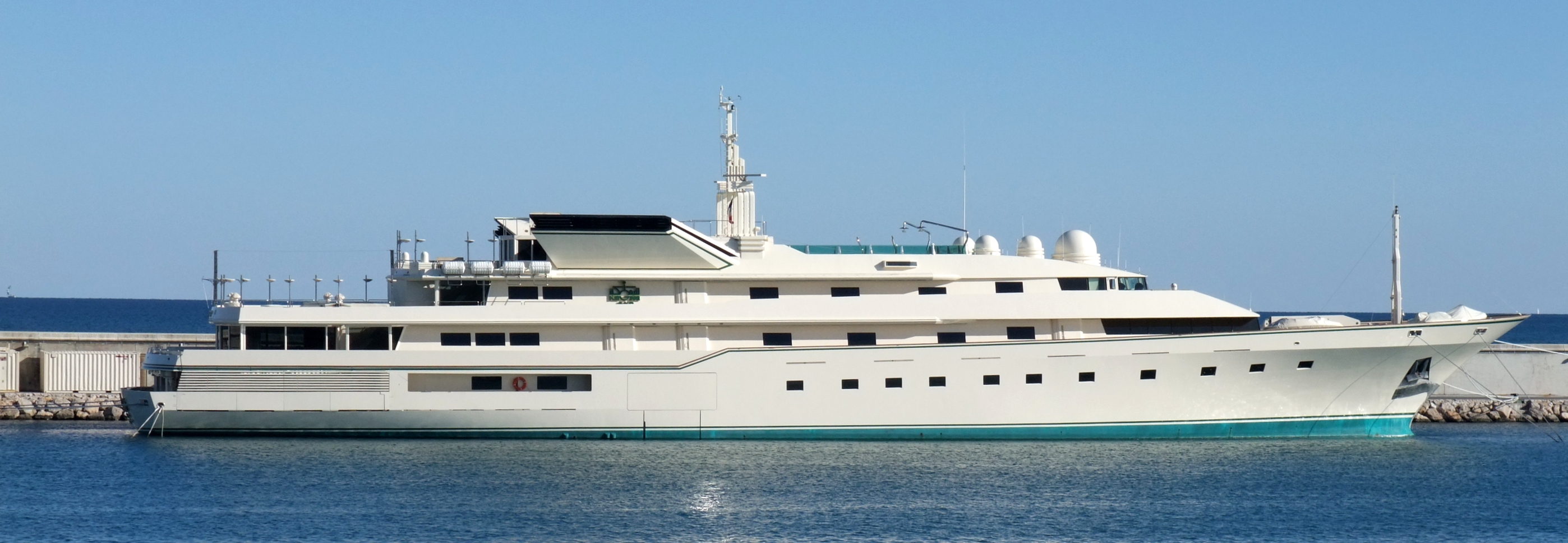
Kingdom 5KR

Kingdom 5KR (originally named Nabila) is an 85.65-metre (281 ft) superyacht built for Saudi billionaire Adnan Khashoggi, and now owned by Saudi business magnate Al-Waleed bin Talal.

== Overview ==
The yacht was built in 1980 by the yacht builder Benetti at a cost of $100 million (equivalent to $391 million in 2025). Its original interior was designed by Luigi Sturchio.

It was originally built as Nabila for Saudi billionaire Adnan Khashoggi (named for his daughter).

During its days as Nabila, it was featured in the James Bond movie Never Say Never Again, in which it was seen as Flying Saucer (translated from Italian Disco Volante in the source novel, Thunderball), the villain's superyacht mobile headquarters. It was also the inspiration for the song "Khashoggi's Ship" on The Miracle, the 1989 album by rock band Queen.

After Khashoggi ran into financial problems, he sold the yacht in 1988 to the Sultan of Brunei, who in turn sold it to Donald Trump for $29 million. After a refit, Trump renamed it Trump Princess. To dock Trump Princess at the Atlantic City harbor, Trump obtained special dredging permits which instead of taking three years were accomplished in only a couple of months with support from Roger Stone and the lobbying firm Black, Manafort, Stone and Kelly.

Then it was sold in 1991 for $20 million to Prince Al-Waleed bin Talal who renamed the yacht Kingdom 5KR. The yacht's latest name stems from the Prince's investment company, Kingdom Holding Company, his lucky number (5), and his children's initials ("K" and "R").

The ship has a beam of 13.25 metres (43.5 ft), a draught of 4.72 metres (15.5 ft) and fuel capacity of 515,000 litres (136,000 US gallons).

When it was delivered it had five decks, a disco, a cinema with seats for twelve, eleven opulent suites, a helipad on top (its funnels are sloped outward to avoid interference with the helicopters), a pool with a water jet on top in front of the heliport, two Riva tenders, a crew of 48, a top speed of 20 knots, and cruising speed of 17.5 knots; propulsion was supplied by two 3,000 horsepower (2,200 kW) NOHAB Polar engines. According to Jonathan Beckett, who brokered the sale of the yacht to Trump, the shower took a team of workers a whole year to construct — it was carved in the shape of a scallop shell from a single piece of onyx and had thirteen nozzles.

== See also ==
- List of motor yachts by length
- Saudi royal family
- Royal yacht
