= Galkynyş yacht =

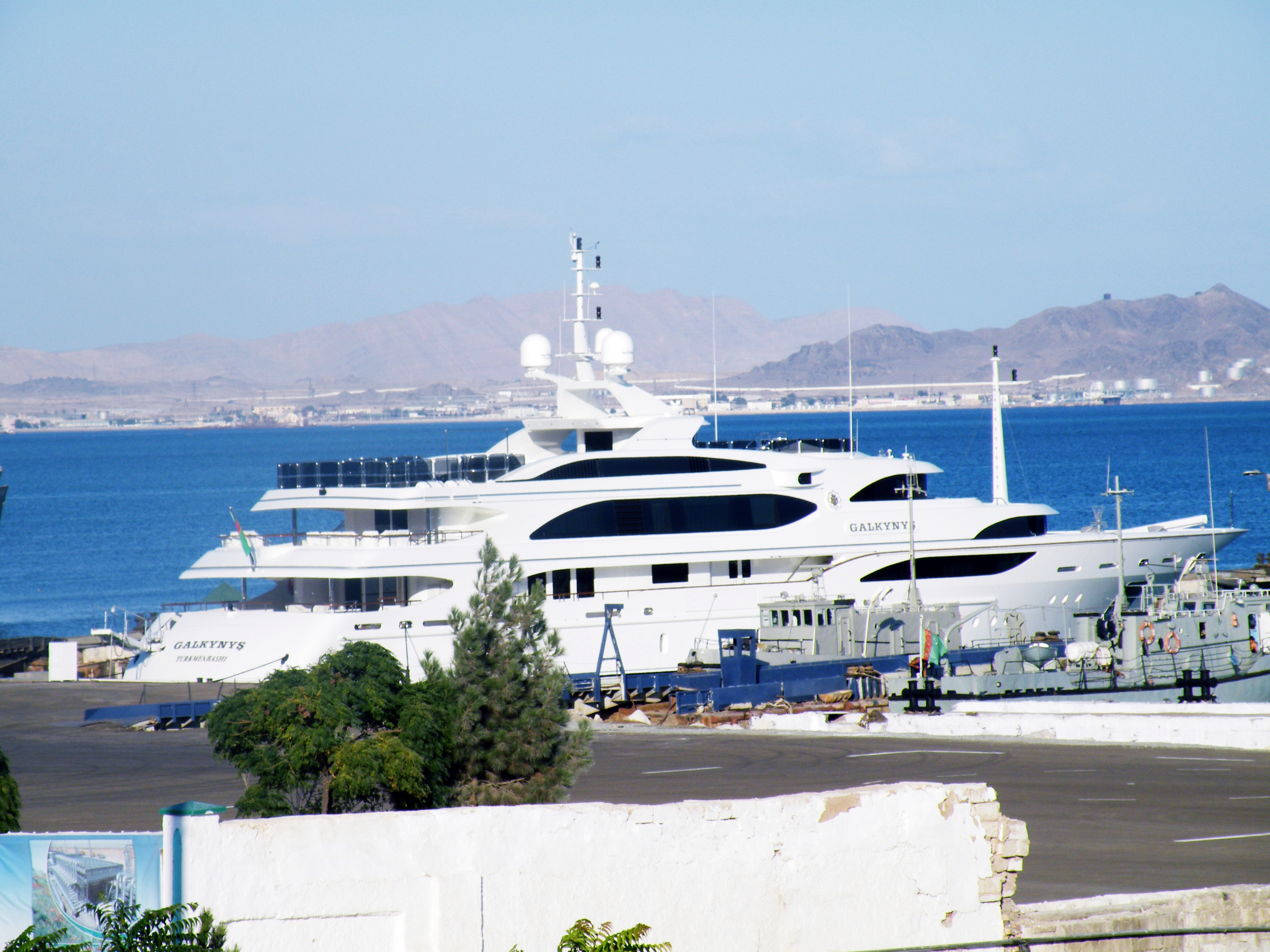

History

Turkmenistan
- Name: Galkynysh
- Namesake: Galkynysh is the Turkmen equivalent of "Renaissance".
- Owner: Turkmenistan government
- Builder: Benetti
- Completed: 2007 as Wind
- Acquired: 2008
- Identification: IMO number: 9445435; MMSI number: 434113600; Callsign: EZCU
- Status: in active service

General characteristics
- Type: Presidential yacht
- Tonnage: 996 gross tons
- Length: 59 m (194 ft)
- Beam: 10.40 m (34 ft)
- Draught: 2.85 m (9 ft 4 in)
- Propulsion: twin 1,769hp MTU 16V 4000 M60 engines
- Speed: 15 knots (28 km/h) (cruise); 16 knots (30 km/h) (max)
- Capacity: 12 guests
- Crew: 15
- Aviation facilities: touch-and-go helipad

Galkynysh is a presidential yacht acquired by the Turkmenistan government in 2008, the first such boat in the Caspian Sea.

== History ==
The vessel was designed by Stefano Natucci and built by the Benetti shipyard in Italy as Wind. In 2008, it was first used in the field meeting of the Cabinet of Ministers of Turkmenistan. The yacht sails the coast of the Caspian Sea.
