= Miami Art Week =

Miami Art Week is a series of art-related fairs, events and showings anchored by Art Basel Miami Beach and that takes place in early December in the Miami area. It is considered the premiere period for contemporary art activity in the United States. It has taken place every year since 2002, with the exception of 2020, when the COVID-19 pandemic resulted in its cancellation.

== Activities ==
In addition to Art Basel Miami Beach, there are now some two dozen satellite art fairs with different curatorial focuses. Among the more established of the satellite conferences are the following:

- PRIZM, which showcases art from Africa and the African diaspora.
- Pinta Miami, which focuses on Ibero-American art.
- UNTITLED Art, which was founded in 2012 with a curated selection of up and coming galleries. It has announced a satellite edition in Houston.
- New Art Dealers Alliance or NADA, highlights up and coming galleries which can often offer an early look at future art stars. Many of the galleries then graduated to main Art Basel Miami Beach.
- Design Miami, located next to Art Basel Miami Beach, is partially managed by the same owners.
- Art Miami, while often treated as a satellite fair, it is actually decades older than Art Basel Miami Beach itself. It originally took place in January, but moved to December to sync up with the other art fairs.
- SCOPE Miami Beach, staged annually in a pavilion on South Beach since the early 2010s, hosts around 100 international exhibitors and public programming under the banner “The New Contemporary.”

== History ==
Art Basel Miami Beach launched in 2002, catalyzing numerous other art fair and events. Local Miami art collectors, including Don and Mera Rubell, worked to convince the Switzerland-based Art Basel fair organizers and local Florida government officials that Miami was a logical stop in the art world circuit. The inaugural Miami fair was originally scheduled for 2001, but was delayed after the 9/11 attacks.
