= SCOPE Art Show =

International contemporary art fair

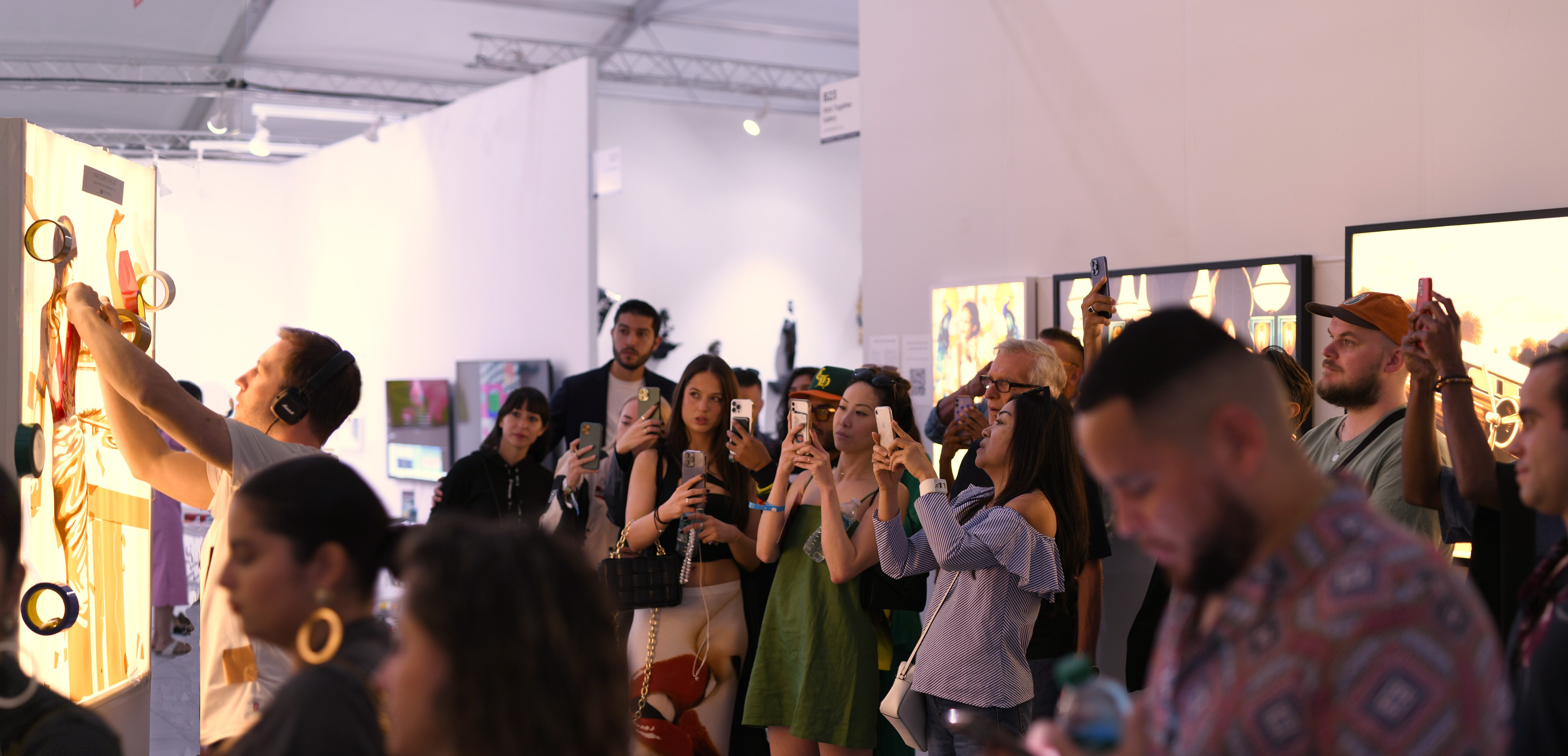
- Max Zorn demonstrating tape art at SCOPE Miami Beach (2022)
- Status: Active
- Genre: Contemporary art fair
- Frequency: Annual
- Locations: Miami Beach, Florida; New York City; Basel, Switzerland
- Inaugurated: 2002
- Founders: Alexis Hubshman
- Website: Official website

SCOPE Art Show (stylized SCOPE) is an international contemporary art fair founded in 2002 by gallerist Alexis Hubshman. The fair has staged editions in Miami Beach, New York, and Basel, with early iterations taking place in hotel venues such as the Gershwin Hotel in New York (May 2002) and the Townhouse in Miami Beach (December 2002). In Miami Beach the fair is mounted during Miami Art Week in a temporary pavilion on South Beach; coverage of the 2019 edition cited about 140 exhibitors and roughly 60,000 anticipated visitors, and the 2024 edition publicized 86 exhibitors and “over 100,000” expected visitors.

== History ==
SCOPE’s first iterations took place in New York at the Gershwin Hotel in May 2002 and at the Townhouse Hotel in Miami Beach in December 2002. In October 2004 the fair debuted in London at the Meliá White House near Regent’s Park during Frieze Week.

SCOPE introduced its Basel edition in June 2007, initially at E‑Halle within walking distance of Art Basel, and later in and around the Kaserne cultural complex. Mid‑2010s editions typically featured on the order of 75–100 exhibitors; for example, Artnet reported “over 100 exhibitors” and a special focus on South Korea for 2015. The Basel edition’s most recent outing was in 2018.

In 2020, amid the COVID‑19 pandemic, SCOPE launched SCOPE Immersive, a two‑part online fair that offered a three‑dimensional viewing environment.

== Editions ==
=== Miami Beach ===
SCOPE Miami Beach is staged annually during Miami Art Week in a temporary pavilion on the sands near Ocean Drive. In 2013 the fair announced a new beachfront location at 10th Street and Ocean Drive with a pavilion format it has used since. Time Out listed 140 exhibitors and roughly 60,000 anticipated visitors for the 2019 edition at 801 Ocean Drive. Local coverage has described SCOPE as one of the few Art Week fairs mounted directly “on the sands of South Beach,” just off Eighth Street and Ocean Drive. For 2024, Artnet reported that the fair expected “over 100,000” visitors and 86 exhibitors.

SCOPE’s public‑facing programming in Miami Beach has included The New Contemporary—a pavilion‑based schedule of installations, talks, music, and wellness activations—and OASIS, a branded day‑to‑night program launched for the 2019 edition. In 2021 SCOPE partnered with blockchain‑ticketing company YellowHeart to offer a limited run of NFT‑minted VIP tickets.

=== New York ===
SCOPE maintained a regular New York presence through 2020, typically aligning its dates with Armory Week. The 20th New York edition (5–8 March 2020) returned to the Metropolitan Pavilion in Chelsea with presentations from about 60 exhibitors.

=== Basel ===
SCOPE Basel launched in 2007 as a satellite fair concurrent with Art Basel, initially at E‑Halle and later moving to a pavilion at the Kaserne complex. Mid‑2010s editions featured on the order of 75–100 exhibitors; in 2015 Artnet reported “over 100 exhibitors.” The Basel edition’s most recent outing was in 2018.

== Programming ==
Across cities SCOPE has produced a mix of curated projects, talks, and partner activations. Long‑standing strands include the Breeder Program for first‑time and emerging galleries and, since 2020, SCOPE Immersive online editions.

== Organization and leadership ==
SCOPE was founded by Alexis Hubshman, who has continued to lead the fair. In October 2024 the fair announced the appointment of its first Director, Hayley River Smith, alongside expanded roles including Head of Strategy and Partnerships (Michael Papadeas) and Client Experience Manager (Tatiana Zancajo).

== See also ==
Miami Art Week

Art Basel Miami
