= Art Basel Miami Beach =

Annual art fair in Florida, US

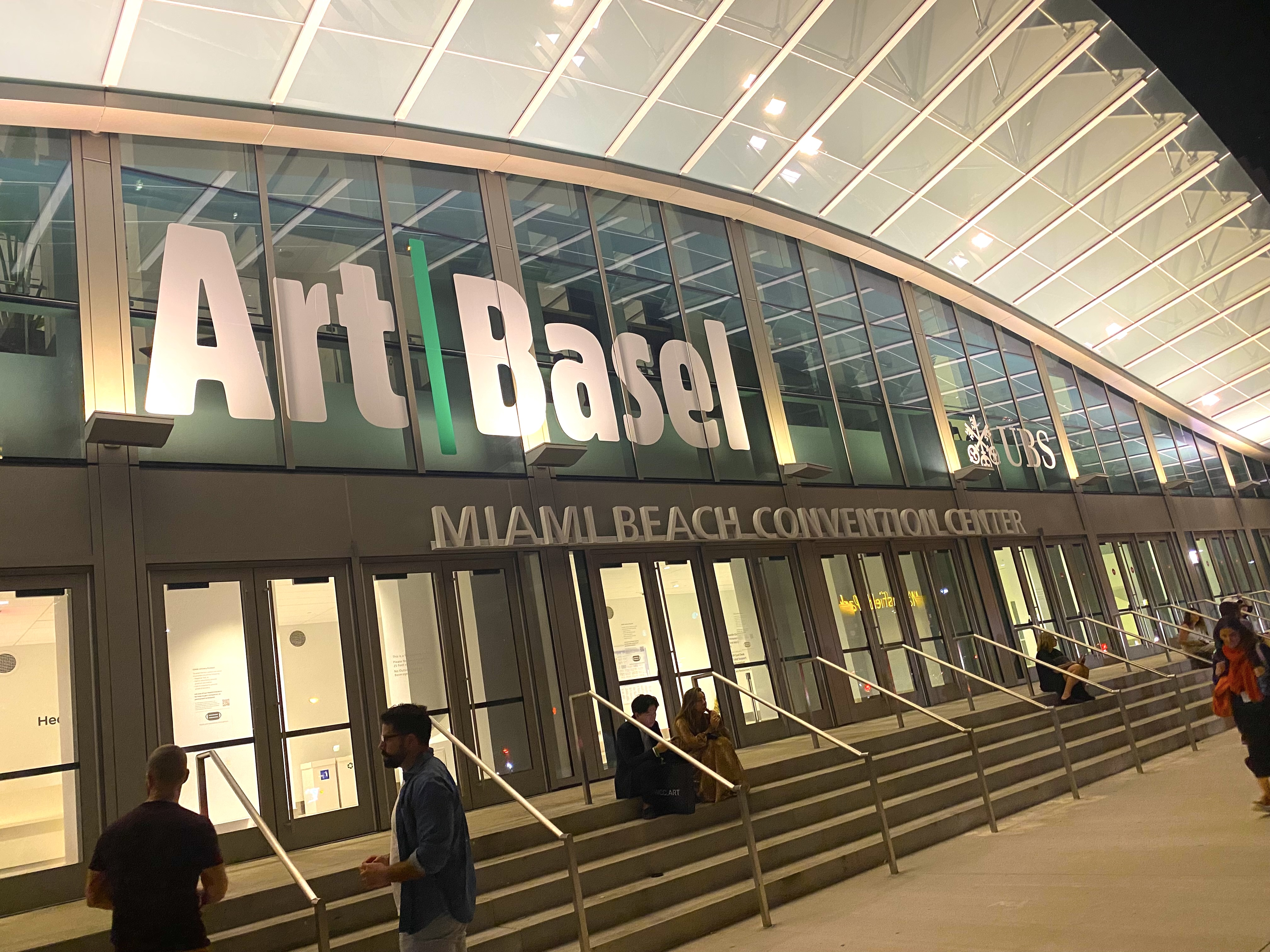
- Art Basel Messeplatz
- Genre: Art fair
- Dates: Early December
- Frequency: Annual
- Locations: Miami Beach, Florida, U.S.
- Inaugurated: 2002
- Next event: December 2026
- Organizer: Art Basel
- People: Bridget Finn, director

Art Basel Miami Beach, sometimes referred to as "Art Basel Miami," is an art fair founded in 2002 as an offshoot of the flagship Art Basel fair in Switzerland. It is currently considered the most important art fair in the United States and was the first of the Art Basel satellite fairs outside of Basel

The main fair takes place in early December each year in the Miami Beach Convention Center and forms the cornerstone of Miami Art Week.

As of 2024, the director of Art Basel Miami Beach is Bridget Finn.

== History ==
Local Miami art collectors, including Don and Mera Rubell, worked to convince Art Basel fair organizers and local Florida government officials that Miami was a logical stop in the art world circuit. The Rubells, who were long-time art collectors, had purchased a 40,000-square-foot warehouse for their growing art collection in the Wynwood neighborhood of Miami in 1993. They were then instrumental in wooing the Swiss-based Art Basel fair to begin a Miami edition. The inaugural Miami fair was originally scheduled for 2001, but was delayed after the 9/11 attacks. Due to its geographic location, Art Basel Miami Beach fair highlights Latin American galleries, artists and institutions.

The rapid growth and success of Art Basel Miami Beach attracted some level of backlash. By the 2010s, critics said Art Basel Miami Beach had become a symbol of everything that was wrong with the art world. Writing in Slate in 2012, Simon Doonan called Art Basel Miami Beach a "promo-party cheese-fest" where he "would rather jump in a river of boiling snot" than attend the art fair.

As of 2024, the cost for a gallery booth in the main section of Art Basel Miami Beach ranged generally ranged from $60,000 to $80,000 with additional costs for a corner booth or other prime placement on the show floor. The sections for smaller galleries have booths that were priced at $11,000 and $26,000.

In December 2025, Art Basel Miami Beach hosted a curated section of digital art titled Zero 10. The section, which was sponsored by OpenSea, was curated by Eli Scheinman, and featured multiple exhibitors, including Beeple and his installation, Regular Animals, which displayed humanoid robots with hyper-realistic heads of prominent individuals in tech and art, like Mark Zuckerberg, Elon Musk, and Picasso.

== Miami Art Week ==
Art Basel Miami Beach has catalyzed some two dozen satellite art fairs with different curatorial focuses to form Miami Art Week. Among the more established of the satellite conferences are

- PRIZM, which showcases art from Africa and the African diaspora.
- Pinta Miami, which focuses on Ibero-American art.
- UNTITLED Art, which was founded in 2012 with a curated selection of up and coming galleries. It announced a satellite edition in Houston.
- NADA, or New Art Dealers Alliance, highlights up and coming galleries which can often offer an early look at future art stars. Many of the galleries then graduated to main Art Basel Miami Beach.
- Design Miami, located next to the main Art Basel Miami Beach, is partially managed by the same owners.
- Art Miami, originally took place in January, but moved to December to sync up with the other art fairs.
- SCOPE Miami Beach, staged annually in a pavilion on South Beach since the early 2010s, hosts around 100 international exhibitors and public programming under the banner “The New Contemporary.”
