= Rossinavi =

Italian shipbuilder

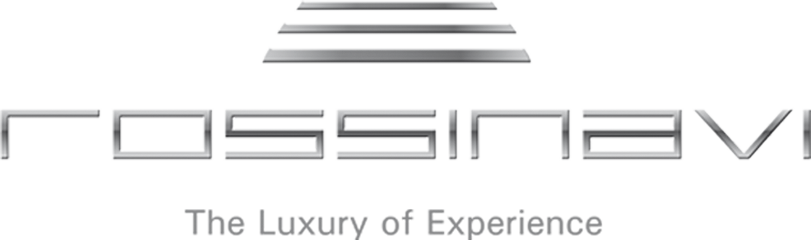
- Industry: Shipbuilding
- Founded: 1980; 46 years ago
- Headquarters: Viareggio, Italy
- Products: Steel and aluminium superyachts − 40 to 70 metres (130 to 230 ft)
- Website: Rossinavi

Rossinavi, founded in 1980, is an Italian shipyard based in Viareggio and specialized in the construction of full-custom steel and aluminium superyachts.

== History ==
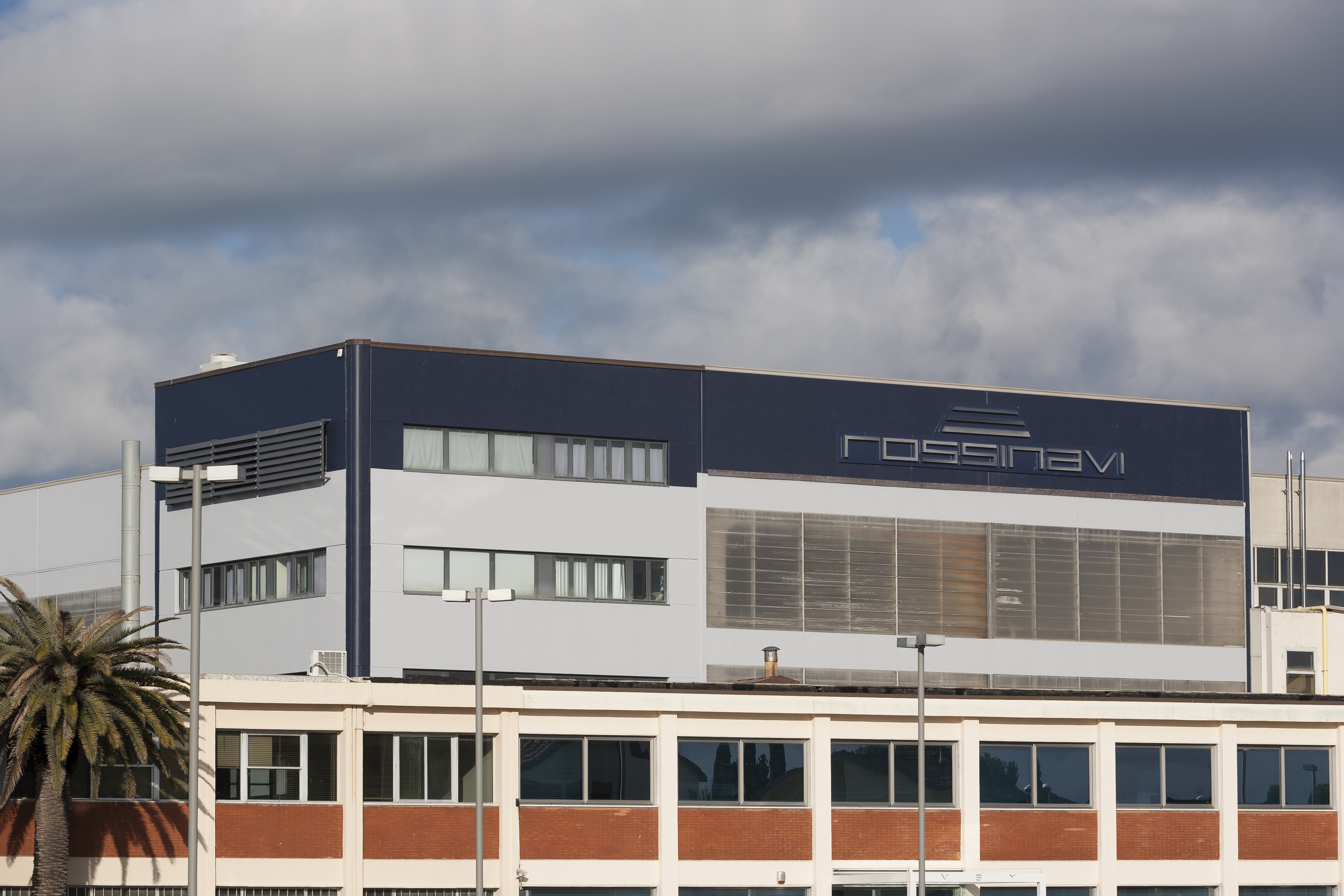
The shipyard

The Rossi shipyard was born in 1980, when the first unlimited partnership company, bound to the mere metallic fabrication, is established by the young brothers Claudio and Paride Rossi.

The eighties see the building of the first inland and coastal passenger vessels together with the production of steel and aluminium hulls and superstructures on account of major shipyards. In the early nineties, the company starts to grow up thanks to a facilities expansions politic.

Determined to leave the subcontractor role, during 2007 the company performed a complete restyling of its image, by acquiring the new brand 'Rossinavi'.

The new brand debuts one year later with the delivery of the 55 metre motor yacht South (now Rarity), followed by the launch of the 70 metre Numptia (now High Power III) in 2011. Since then, the shipyard has launched other 15 full-custom superyachts, with additional 5 motor yachts currently under construction.

== Fleet ==
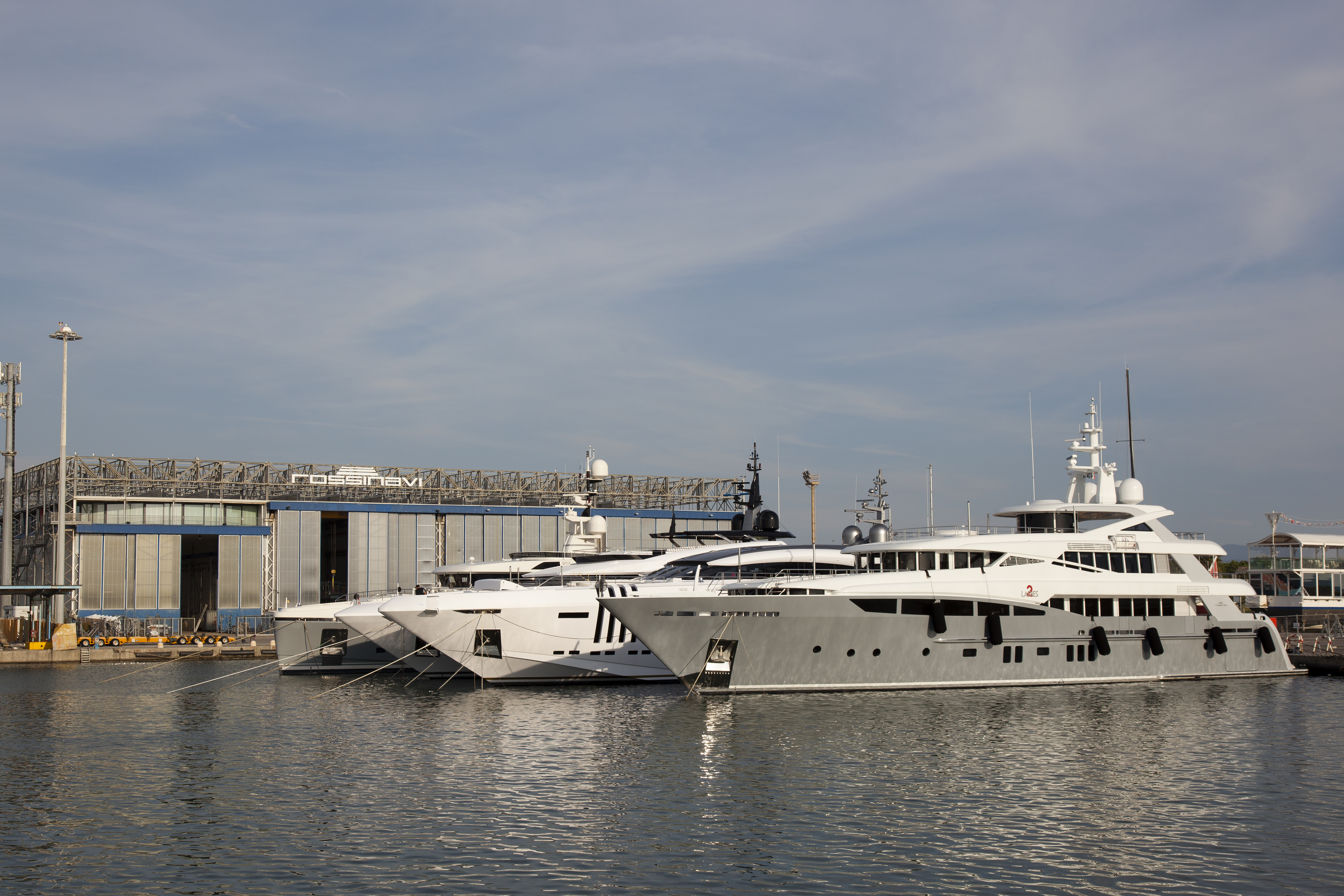
Rossinavi M/Ys 2 Ladies, Vellmarì, Polaris I and Endeavour 2

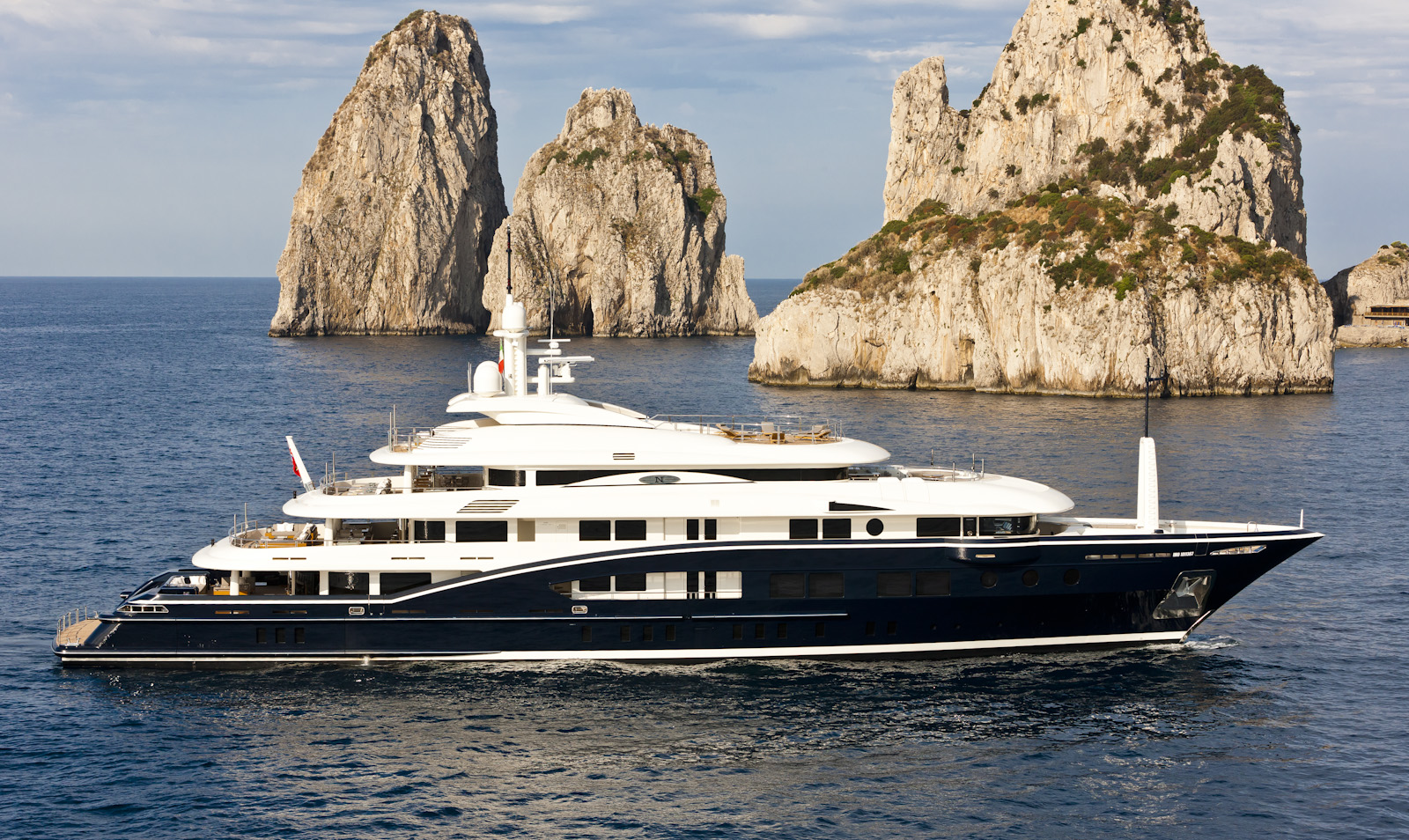
High Power III near Capri

| Name | Length | Year |
|---|---|---|
| Piacere | 49.95 m (163 ft 11 in) | 2021 |
| Polaris | 70.20 m (230 ft 4 in) | 2021 |
| Florentia | 52.00 m (170 ft 7 in) | 2020 |
| EIV | 48.80 m (160 ft 1 in) | 2020 |
| LEL | 49.70 m (163 ft 1 in) | 2020 |
| Flying Dagger | 49.90 m (163 ft 9 in) | 2018 |
| Utopia IV | 63.00 m (206 ft 8 in) | 2018 |
| N2H | 48.50 m (159 ft 1 in) | 2017 |
| Aurora | 49.00 m (160 ft 9 in) | 2017 |
| Endeavour 2 | 49.90 m (163 ft 9 in) | 2017 |
| Taransay | 38.55 m (126 ft 6 in) | 2015 |
| Parillion | 48.29 m (158 ft 5 in) | 2014 |
| Param Jamuna IV | 48.31 m (158 ft 6 in) | 2013 |
| Vellmarì | 47.50 m (155 ft 10 in) | 2013 |
| Aslec 4 | 45.37 m (148 ft 10 in) | 2012 |
| 2 Ladies | 46.35 m (152 ft 1 in) | 2012 |
| High Power III (ex Numptia) | 70.00 m (229 ft 8 in) | 2011 |
| Rarity (ex Syna and South) | 55.00 m (180 ft 5 in) | 2008 |

== Awards ==
| Motor Yacht | Award | Year |
|---|---|---|
| Utopia IV | World Superyacht Award | 2019 |
| Utopia IV | International Superyacht Society Award | 2019 |
| Flying Dagger | RINA Green Plus Platinum Award | 2018 |
| Utopia IV | RINA Green Plus Platinum Award | 2018 |
| Aurora | Robb Report Best Yacht of the Year Award | 2018 |
| Endeavour 2 | International Superyacht Society Award | 2018 |
| Taransay | International Superyacht Society Award | 2015 |
| Taransay | RINA Green Plus Gold Award | 2015 |
| Taransay | MYS Monaco Award | 2015 |
| Polaris I | World Superyacht Award | 2015 |
| Polaris I | RINA Green Plus Gold Award | 2014 |
| Vellmarì | Showboats Design Award | 2014 |
| Vellmarì | World Superyacht Award | 2014 |
| Param Jamuna IV | RINA Green Plus Award | 2013 |
| Vellmarì | World Yacht Trophies | 2013 |
| Aslec 4 | Showboats Design Award | 2013 |
| Aslec 4 | RINA Green Plus Award | 2012 |
| High Power III (ex Numptia) | Showboats Design Award | 2012 |
| High Power III (ex Numptia) | World Superyacht Award | 2012 |
| High Power III (ex Numptia) | RINA Green Plus Award | 2011 |
| Rarity (ex Syna and South) | World Yacht Trophies | 2008 |
| Rarity (ex Syna and South) | RINA Green Plus Award | 2008 |

== See also ==
- Azimut Yachts
- Baglietto
- Benetti
- Codecasa
- Fincantieri
- Sanlorenzo
- List of Italian companies
