= Azimut Yachts =

Italian yacht builder

Coordinates: 44.103926°N 8.2475223°E

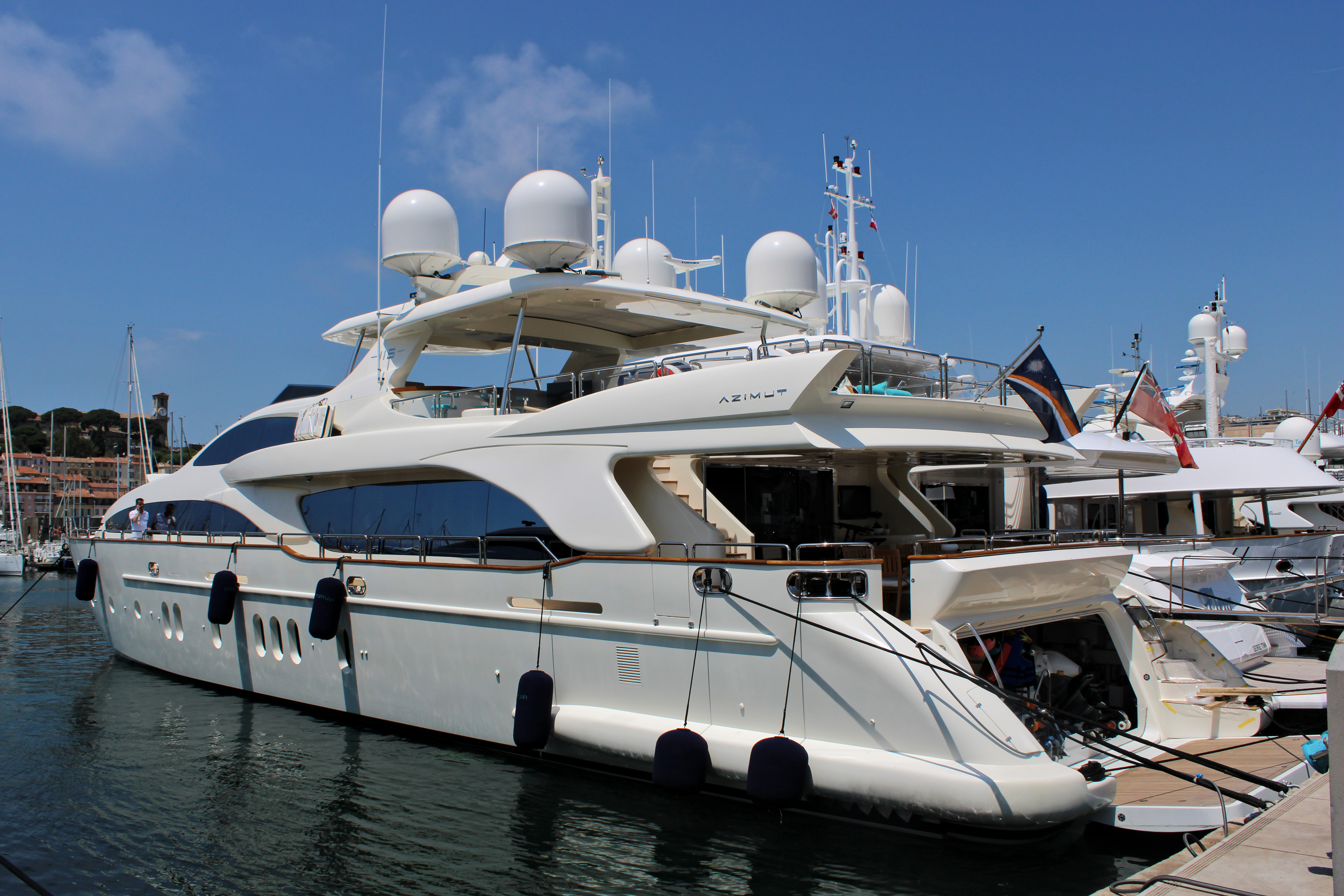
- Type: Subsidiary
- Industry: Yacht chartering, Yacht building
- Founded: 1969
- Founder: Paolo Vitelli
- Headquarters: Viareggio, Italy
- Area served: Worldwide
- Key people: Giovanna Vitelli
- Products: Yachts
- Revenue: 1.2 billion EUR (2022)
- Parent: Azimut Benetti S.p.A.
- Website: www.azimutyachts.com

Azimut Yachts is an Italian yacht manufacturing company based in Viareggio, Italy. It was established in 1969 by Paolo Vitelli. On December 31, 2024, Paolo Vitelli died suddenly on the spot following a fall near his home in Ayas, Aosta Valley, in the frazione of Mascognaz.

The Azimut Benetti group has been managed since 2023 by Vitelli's daughter, Giovanna, and produces motor boats from 9 to 110 metres under the Azimut and Benetti brands in six shipyards, in Avigliana in Piedmont, Savona in Liguria, Viareggio and Livorno in Tuscany, Fano in Marche and Itajai in Brazil.

== Overview ==
The company began by chartering sailboats. It later developed into a luxury yacht building industry. The first major work started with a contract at the shipyard of Amerglass, a Dutch shipyard producing boats in fiberglass. The company evolved again, adding the distribution of sailing boats, motorcruisers and finally motoryachts from different makers, including British Powles, Westerly, and others.

The company currently owns Benetti, another luxury ship building company.

== History ==
Azimut Yachts started in 1969, when Paolo Vitelli founded Azimut Srl and started chartering sailboats.

In 1970, the 'Amerglass' brand of yachts chose the company to distribute their boats in Italy.

From 1979, Azimut expanded its activities: in addition to distribution, it began to design new yachts. As part of a joint venture with Amerglass, she designed the AZ 43' Bali, a mass-produced fiberglass boat. The company expanded its range, focusing on the lower segment of the market with the launch of the AZ 32' Targa in 1977, the "Ford T" of the boating world. It also focused on the high end segment of the market with the launch of the Azimut 105' Failaka in 1982.

In 1985, Azimut acquired Benetti - the brand based in Viareggio, which has been manufacturing boats since 1873.

From the late 1990s, the company acquired new shipyards in Fano, restructured the Benetti shipyard in Viareggio and constructed a new shipyard in Avigliana, in the province of Turin.

== Ship building ==
The headquarters site houses is a 100,000 square meter facility of offices and the factory, which can build 300 boats (of up to 68 feet (21 m) LOA) per year. Larger yachts are ordered from other, larger shipyards in the world.

== Charter ==
The company was established for boat chartering and continues to provide this service.

== See also ==
- Baglietto
- Benetti
- Codecasa
- Fincantieri
- Rossinavi
- Sanlorenzo
