= Benetti =

Italian shipbuilding and boat company

Coordinates: 43.8634086°N 10.2435596°E

Benetti S.p.A.
- Type: Subsidiary
- Industry: Yacht Building, Shipbuilding
- Founded: 1873; 153 years ago
- Headquarters: Viareggio, Italy
- Area served: Worldwide
- Key people: Lorenzo Benetti (till 1914) L
- Products: Yachts
- Revenue: Unknown
- Parent: Azimut Benetti S.p.A.
- Website: www.benettiyachts.it

Benetti is an Italian shipbuilding and boat building company based in Viareggio, Livorno, and Fano, owned by Azimut Benetti S.p.A.

Benetti designs and constructs motoryachts, and is one of the leading builders of custom superyachts, having won the Showboats International magazine "shipyard number 1" award six times in a row, the only yard to have done so.

== History ==
Founded in 1873, when Lorenzo Benetti (1844–1914), bought the Darsena Luca shipyard to found the Benetti shipyard. The yard built commercial vessels, including fishing boats and Mediterranean trading ships. On his death in 1914, his sons Gino and Emilio took over, and renamed the yard Fratelli Benetti. They continued using wooden construction, but now built ocean-going ships, and some private yachts. After the death of Gino in 1927, his sons Giuseppe and Virgilio took over his share, while Maurizio and Bertani assisted their father Emilio.

=== World War II ===
During World War II, the yard built medium-sized military vessels in steel, but due to highly effective bombing, the production was severely limited. After the war, and with restrictions on Italy on what she could produce militarily, the yard produced the first steel-hulled diesel powered vessel in the locality, the "Raphaelo". In 1954, Fratelli Benetti split its sailing and yacht business (Gino's family), from the commercial ship building business which continues under the name M&B Benetti (Emilio's family). Emilio has a holding in both companies, and chairs both companies.

In 1963, Emilio died and the running of Fratelli Benetti was taken over by Gusieppe and his son Lorenzo. Lorenzo was the driver of the yacht business, moving instantly from wooden to steel construction, and designing three styles of yacht which brought the name Benetti to the world: the Delfino, the Tirreno and the Meditteraneo lines (from 18 to 33 metres). Demand for these vessels outstripped the capabilities of the yard. In 1978, the yard launched the "Viano", a sailing yacht which on corrected times won the Admirals Cup. In 1979, the yard launched "Nabila" for Adnan Khashoggi, which at 83 metres and 2,465 tonnes was the largest yacht of its time.

=== Sale to Azimut ===
Lorenzo died in 1980 and the company fell into financial difficulties until 1984, when it was purchased by Paolo Vitelli, the owner of Azimut, who renamed it Benetti Shipyard. In 1988, Benetti built a ship to challenge the transatlantic Blue Riband award but its efforts proved unsuccessful. The company is now part of the Azimut I Benetti group, also owner of Fraser Yachts.

== Shipyards ==
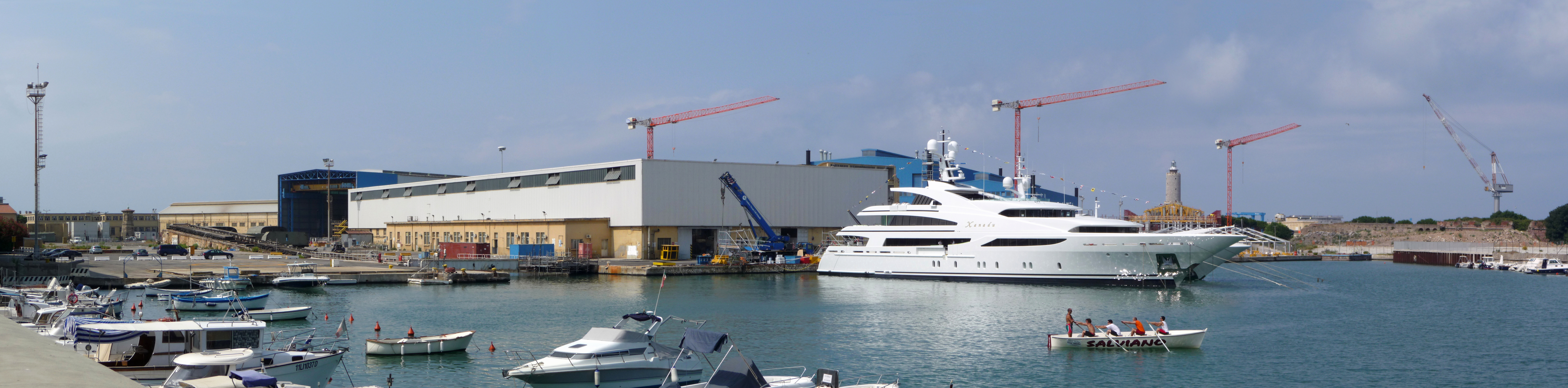
The old Cantiere navale fratelli Orlando warehouse no longer in use

=== Viareggio shipyard ===
Viareggio is the historical shipyard, in 1990 Benetti took over the 47,000sq m Lusben yard to allow the construction of both the Azimut range up to 100 ft, and the composite Benetti range and in 1997 was vastly expanded to 10,000 square metres (12,000 yd^{2}) to allow indoor building of yachts up to 70 m. In 2003 was acquired the area of the SEC yard which went bankrupt in the previous years in order to expand the production.

=== Fano shipyard ===
The company purchased the Siar-Moschino yard in Fano in 1998, taking the total capacity to 44,000 square metres (53,000 yd^{2}). The yard has a 60 m wharf in the port.

=== Livorno shipyard ===
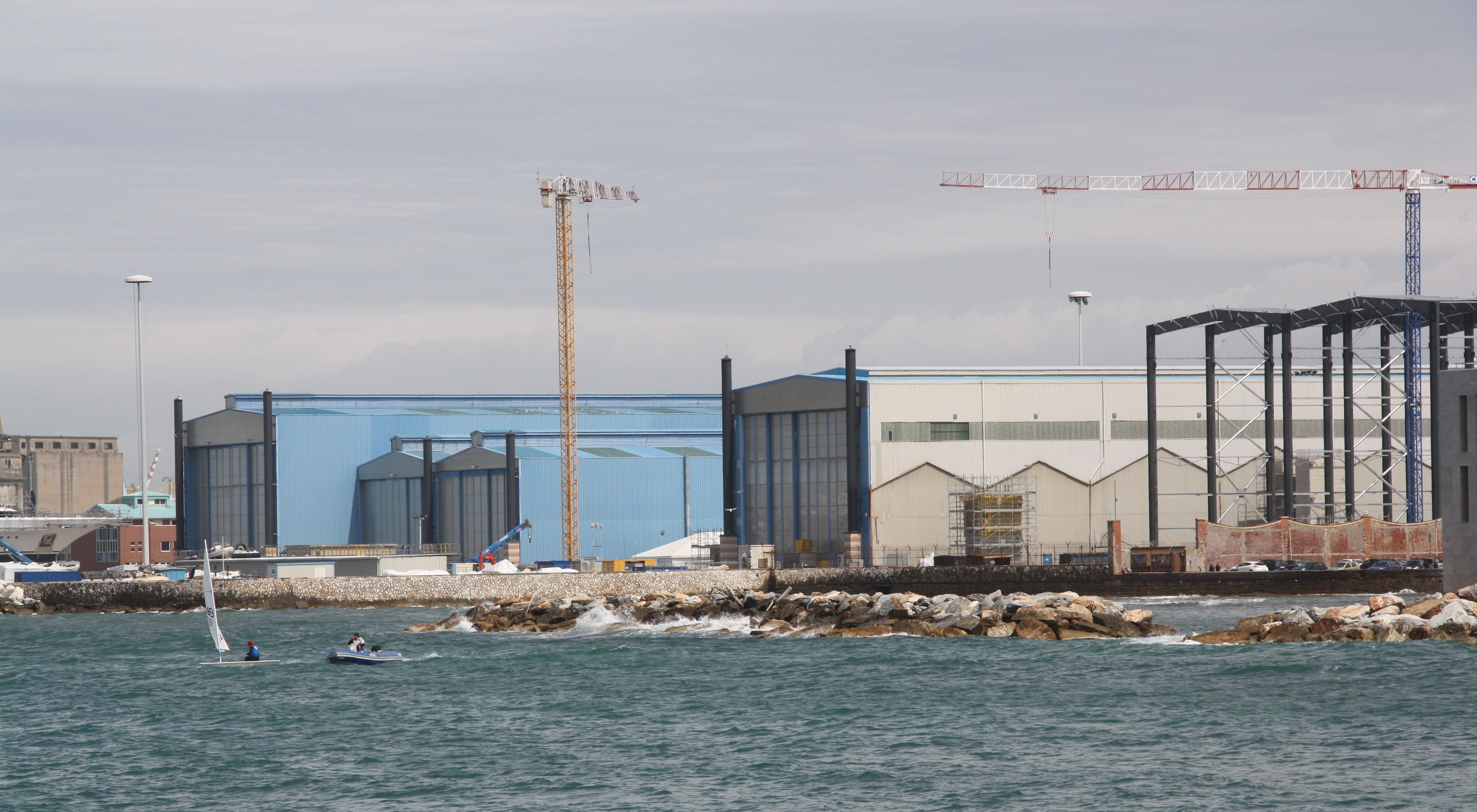
Benetti Livorno shipyard toward Morosini Marina

Azimut-Benetti acquired the Cantiere navale fratelli Orlando in 2003 when the Livorno yard was in severe economic difficulties. The old shipyard has been partially demolished to make space for a residential and commercial area named Porta a Mare (Gate to sea), the part toward the entrance of the harbour was transformed with the construction of six huge sheds were to laid down the yachts. The Morosini slip was dismantled and was erected a Marina where to berth the yachts built. Benetti Livorno shipyard has a covered area of 30,000 sq m, a production area of 28,000 sq m, an open area of 130,000 sq m and a total area of 190,000 sq m.

== Benetti models ==
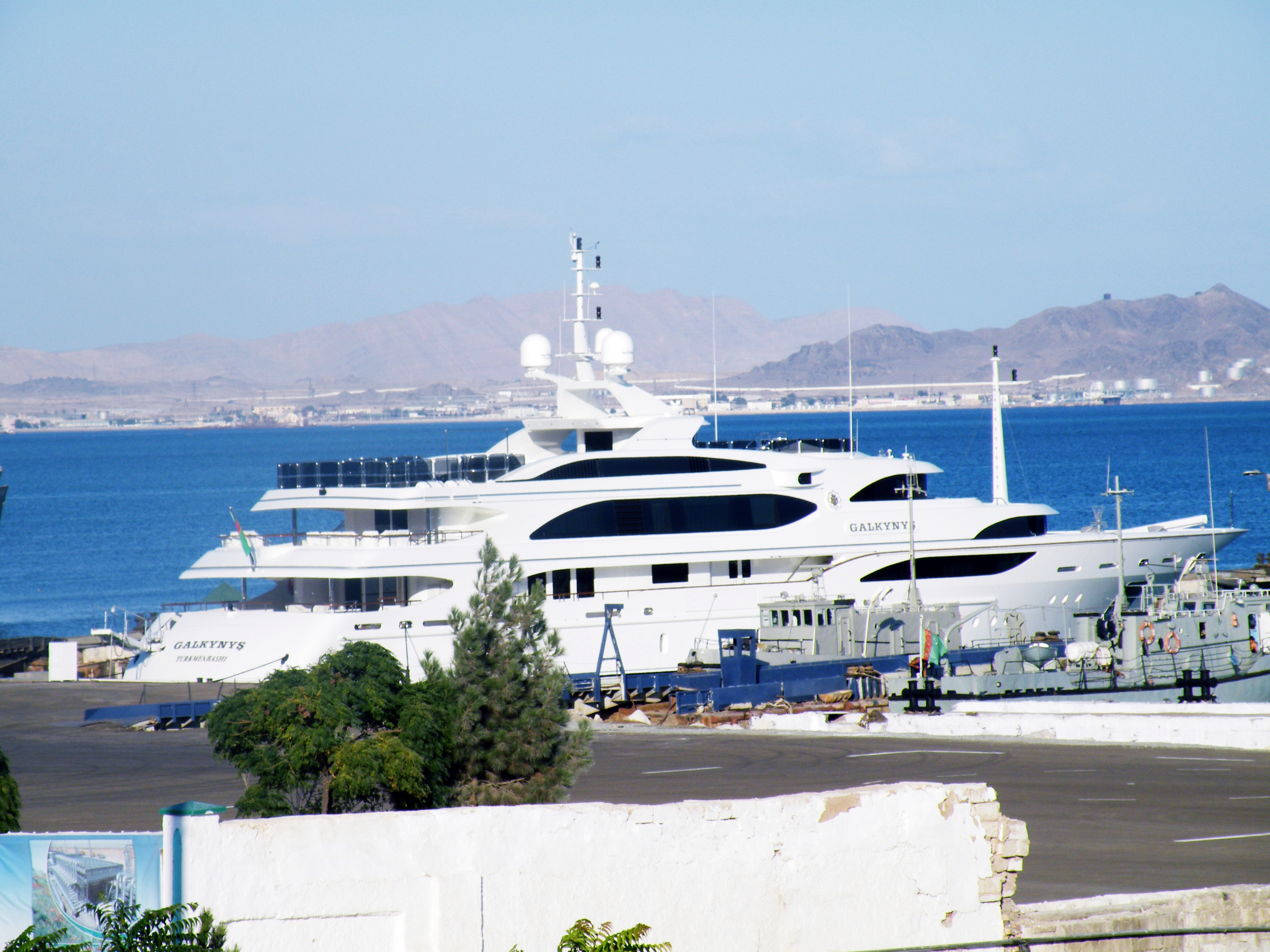
Galkynyş yacht

Benetti Tradition is model of traditional yachts built by Benetti Yard. With fiberglass hull sizes up to 99 feet, powered by the Caterpillar C18 the maximum speed of Benetti Tradition 99 is 15 knots.

Benetti Classic is a classical yacht, with a style very similar to those of Benetti Tradition but with a larger hull size. With fiberglass hull sizes up to 143feet, powered by the Caterpillar C30 with higher power of 1,650 hp (each), the maximum speed of Benetti Classic is 16 knots.

Benetti Vision is a more modern style yacht with large measurements up to 143 feet. The beauty of this yacht is in its atmosphere and its shape and exterior. Benetti Vision has two main engines of Caterpillar 3508B, with maximum power of 1,300 hp (each). This gives the yacht a maximum speed of 15 knots. This is a slightly less than Benetti Classic series, but with lower fuel consumption. The yacht has a designed interior with equipment for watersports and fishing.

Benetti FB is the last series. This is the manufacturer's first series of luxury yachts. Some of the names of the yachts built by Benetti in the series FB are called Amnesia, I Dinasty, Wind, Alibella and many more. All of these yachts are from the highest level of luxury, comfort and expenses.

In May 2010, Benetti yachts announced Benetti imagination, which is first super yacht from Benetti's new 47 meter line. Imagination is designed by Stefano Natucci and Francois Zuretti.

In 2011 the company delivered a "Benetti Vision 145"—their 16th. It had a specification of 390 tons fully loaded.

In 2015, Benetti partnered with Henrik Fisker to launch new series of 164 ft super yachts called Benetti Fisker 50.

=== Superyachts ===
Benetti built hundreds of yachts over the years. Below is a list of selected Benetti yachts:

Superyachts over 50m
Name	Length	Date Launched	Picture	References
FB275	108m	2019		
ZOZA	107m	2019		
LANA	107m	2019		
LIONHEART	90m	2016		
KINGDOM 5KR	86m	1980		
FREEDOM	70m	1999		
SPECTRE	69m	2018		
SEASENSE	67m	2017		
AMBROSIA	65m	2006		
RAHIL	65m	2011		
SEANNA	65m	2011		
METIS	65m	2019		
MIDLANDIA	52m	2001		

=== Clients ===
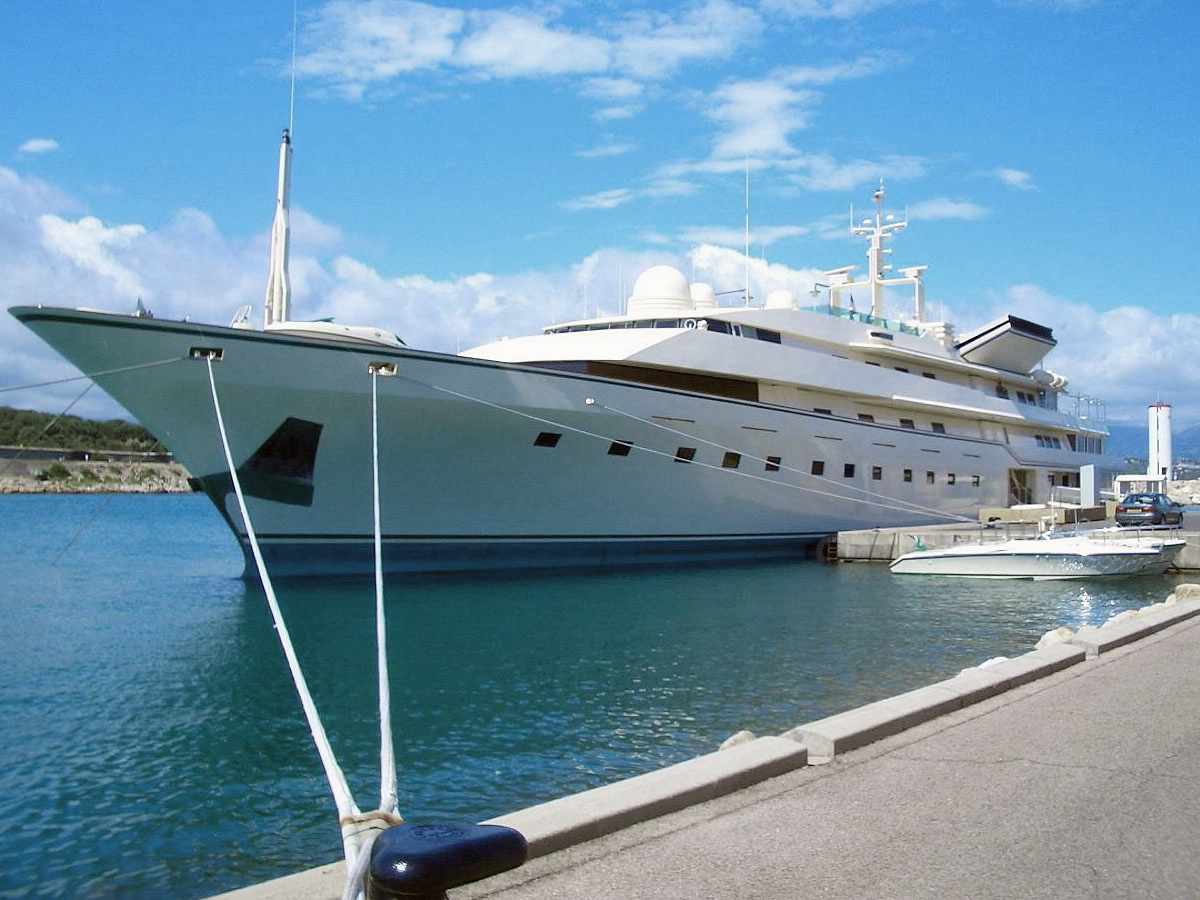
Benetti yacht Kingdom 5KR, built as Nabila

Benetti have built super yachts for many customers, including:

- Nabila for Adnan Khashoggi
- Galkynyş for the government of Turkmenistan, to be used as a Presidential yacht by Gurbanguly Berdimuhamedow
- Reverie for Kjell Inge Røkke
- Lionheart for the Monaco based British retail entrepreneur Philip Green
- ”Illusion V” now owned by the Mata family and also available for charter.

== See also ==
- Rossinavi
- List of Italian companies
- List of large sailing yachts
