= United States at the 2000 Summer Olympics =

- Flag of the United States
- IOC code: USA
- NOC: United States Olympic Committee

in Sydney
- Competitors: 586 (333 men and 253 women) in 31 sports
- Flag bearers: Cliff Meidl (opening); Rulon Gardner (closing)
- Medals Ranked 1st: Gold 37 Silver 24 Bronze 32 Total 93

Summer Olympics appearances (overview)
- 1896; 1900; 1904; 1908; 1912; 1920; 1924; 1928; 1932; 1936; 1948; 1952; 1956; 1960; 1964; 1968; 1972; 1976; 1980; 1984; 1988; 1992; 1996; 2000; 2004; 2008; 2012; 2016; 2020; 2024

Other related appearances
- 1906 Intercalated Games

The United States of America (USA), the previous host of the 1996 Olympics at Atlanta, competed at the 2000 Summer Olympics in Sydney, Australia. 586 competitors, 333 men and 253 women, took part in 265 events in 31 sports.

== Medalists ==
The following U.S. competitors won medals at the games. In the discipline sections below, the medalists' names are bolded.

Medal	Name	Sport	Event	Date
Gold	Nancy Johnson	Shooting	Women's 10 m air rifle	September 16
Gold	Erin Phenix^{[a]} Courtney Shealy; Ashley Tappin^{[a]} Jenny Thompson; Dara Torres; Amy Van Dyken	Swimming	Women's 4 × 100 m freestyle relay	September 16
Gold	Brooke Bennett	Swimming	Women's 400 m freestyle	September 17
Gold	Tara Nott	Weightlifting	Women's 48 kg	September 17
Gold	Lenny Krayzelburg	Swimming	Men's 100 m backstroke	September 18
Gold	Megan Quann	Swimming	Women's 100 m breaststroke	September 18
Gold	Tom Malchow	Swimming	Men's 200 m butterfly	September 19
Gold	Misty Hyman	Swimming	Women's 200 m butterfly	September 19
Gold	Samantha Arsenault; Lindsay Benko; Kim Black^{[a]} Diana Munz; Julia Stowers^{[a]} Jenny Thompson	Swimming	Women's 4 × 200 m freestyle relay	September 19
Gold	Marty Nothstein	Cycling	Men's sprint	September 20
Gold	Tom Dolan	Swimming	Men's 400 m medley	September 20
Gold	Lenny Krayzelburg	Swimming	Men's 200 m backstroke	September 21
Gold	David O'Connor	Equestrian	Individual Eventing	September 22
Gold	Anthony Ervin	Swimming	Men's 50 m freestyle	September 22
Gold	Gary Hall Jr.	Swimming	Men's 50 m freestyle	September 22
Gold	Brooke Bennett	Swimming	Women's 800 m freestyle	September 22
Gold	Barbara Bedford; Megan Quann; Courtney Shealy^{[a]} Staciana Stitts^{[a]} Ashley Tappin^{[a]} Jenny Thompson; Dara Torres; Amy Van Dyken^{[a]}	Swimming	Women's 4 × 100 m medley relay	September 22
Gold	Maurice Greene	Athletics	Men's 100 m	September 23
Gold	Ian Crocker; Gary Hall Jr. Tommy Hannan^{[a]} Lenny Krayzelburg; Jason Lezak^{[a]} Ed Moses; Neil Walker^{[a]}	Swimming	Men's 4 × 100 m medley relay	September 23
Gold	Laura Wilkinson	Diving	Women's platform	September 24
Gold	Michael Johnson	Athletics	Men's 400 m	September 25
Gold	Stacy Dragila	Athletics	Women's pole vault	September 25
Gold	United States women's national softball team: Christie Ambrosi; Laura Berg; Jennifer Brundage; Crystl Bustos; Sheila Cornell; Lisa Fernandez; Lori Harrigan; Danielle Henderson; Jennifer McFalls; Stacey Nuveman; Leah O'Brien; Dot Richardson; Michele Mary Smith; Michelle Venturella; Christa Lee Williams	Softball	Women's tournament	September 25
Gold	Dain Blanton; Eric Fonoimoana	Volleyball	Men's beach	September 26
Gold	Angelo Taylor	Athletics	Men's 400 m hurdles	September 27
Gold	United States national baseball team: Brent Abernathy; Kurt Ainsworth; Pat Borders; Sean Burroughs; John Cotton; Travis Dawkins; Adam Everett; Ryan Franklin; Chris George; Shane Heams; Marcus Jensen; Mike Kinkade; Rick Krivda; Doug Mientkiewicz; Mike Neill; Roy Oswalt; Jon Rauch; Anthony Sanders; Bobby Seay; Ben Sheets; Brad Wilkerson; Todd Williams; Ernie Young; Tim Young	Baseball	Men's tournament	September 27
Gold	Serena Williams; Venus Williams	Tennis	Women's doubles	September 27
Gold	Rulon Gardner	Wrestling	Men's Greco-Roman 130 kg	September 27
Gold	Steven López	Taekwondo	Men's 68 kg	September 28
Gold	Venus Williams	Tennis	Women's singles	September 28
Gold	Nick Hysong	Athletics	Men's pole vault	September 29
Gold	Kenneth Brokenburr^{[a]} Jon Drummond; Maurice Greene; Brian Lewis; Tim Montgomery^{[a]} Bernard Williams	Athletics	Men's 4 × 100 m relay	September 30
Gold	Andrea Anderson^{[a]} LaTasha Colander; Monique Hennagan; Jearl Miles Clark	Athletics	Women's 4 × 400 m relay	September 30
Gold	United States women's national basketball team: Ruthie Bolton; Teresa Edwards; Yolanda Griffith; Chamique Holdsclaw; Lisa Leslie; Nikki McCray; DeLisha Milton-Jones; Katie Smith; Dawn Staley; Sheryl Swoopes; Natalie Williams; Kara Wolters	Basketball	Women's tournament	September 30
Gold	Magnus Liljedahl; Mark Reynolds	Sailing	Star class	September 30
Gold	Brandon Slay	Wrestling	Men's freestyle 76 kg	September 30
Gold	United States men's national basketball team: Shareef Abdur-Rahim; Ray Allen; Vin Baker; Vince Carter; Kevin Garnett; Tim Hardaway; Allan Houston; Jason Kidd; Antonio McDyess; Alonzo Mourning; Gary Payton; Steve Smith	Basketball	Men's tournament	October 1
Silver	Josh Davis^{[a]} Anthony Ervin; Gary Hall Jr. Jason Lezak; Scott Tucker^{[a]} Neil Walker	Swimming	Men's 4 × 100 m freestyle relay	September 16
Silver	Ed Moses	Swimming	Men's 100 m breaststroke	September 17
Silver	Diana Munz	Swimming	Women's 400 m freestyle	September 17
Silver	Chad Carvin^{[a]} Josh Davis; Nate Dusing^{[a]} Scott Goldblatt; Klete Keller; Jamie Rauch	Swimming	Men's 4 × 200 m freestyle relay	September 19
Silver	Vic Wunderle	Archery	Men's individual	September 20
Silver	Tom Dolan	Swimming	Men's 200 m individual medley	September 20
Silver	Erik Vendt	Swimming	Men's 400 m individual medley	September 20
Silver	Kristy Kowal	Swimming	Women's 200 m breaststroke	September 20
Silver	Aaron Peirsol	Swimming	Men's 200 m backstroke	September 21
Silver	Adam Nelson	Athletics	Men's shot put	September 22
Silver	Sebastian Bea; Edward Murphy	Rowing	Men's pair	September 23
Silver	United States women's national water polo team: Robin Beauregard; Ellen Estes; Courtney Johnson; Ericka Lorenz; Heather Moody; Maureen O'Toole; Bernice Orwig; Nicolle Payne; Heather Petri; Kathy Sheehy; Coralie Simmons; Julie Swail; Brenda Villa	Water polo	Women's tournament	September 23
Silver	Alvin Harrison	Athletics	Men's 400 m	September 24
Silver	Terrence Trammell	Athletics	Men's 110 m hurdles	September 25
Silver	Matt Lindland	Wrestling	Men's Greco-Roman 76 kg	September 26
Silver	United States women's national soccer team: Brandi Chastain; Lorrie Fair; Joy Fawcett; Julie Foudy; Michelle French; Mia Hamm; Kristine Lilly; Shannon MacMillan; Tiffeny Milbrett; Siri Mullinix; Carla Overbeck; Cindy Parlow; Christie Rampone; Briana Scurry; Nikki Serlenga; Danielle Slaton; Kate Sobrero; Sara Whalen	Soccer	Women's tournament	September 28
Silver	Paul Foerster; Robert Merrick	Sailing	Men's 470	September 28
Silver	J. J. Isler; Sarah Glaser	Sailing	Women's 470	September 28
Silver	Lawrence Johnson	Athletics	Men's pole vault	September 29
Silver	Mari Holden	Cycling	Women's road time trial	September 30
Silver	Sammie Henson	Wrestling	Men's freestyle 54 kg	September 30
Silver	Rocky Juarez	Boxing	Featherweight	October 1
Silver	Ricardo Williams	Boxing	Light Welterweight	October 1
Silver	Emily de Riel	Modern Pentathlon	Women's event	October 1
Bronze	Klete Keller	Swimming	Men's 400 m freestyle	September 16
Bronze	Dara Torres	Swimming	Women's 100 m butterfly	September 17
Bronze	Nina Fout; David O'Connor; Karen O'Connor; Linden Wiesman	Equestrian	Team eventing	September 19
Bronze	Amy Chow; Jamie Dantzscher; Dominique Dawes; Kristen Maloney; Elise Ray; Tasha Schwikert	Gymnastics	Women's artistic team all-around	September 19
Bronze	Kim Rhode	Shooting	Women's double trap	September 19
Bronze	Cristina Teuscher	Swimming	Women's 200 m individual medley	September 19
Bronze	Gary Hall Jr.	Swimming	Men's 100 m freestyle	September 20
Bronze	Tom Wilkens	Swimming	Men's 200 m individual medley	September 20
Bronze	Jenny Thompson	Swimming	Women's 100 m freestyle	September 20
Bronze	Dara Torres	Swimming	Women's 100 m freestyle	September 20
Bronze	Amanda Beard	Swimming	Women's 200 m breaststroke	September 20
Bronze	Butch Johnson; Rod White; Vic Wunderle	Archery	Men's team	September 22
Bronze	John Godina	Athletics	Men's shot put	September 22
Bronze	Kaitlin Sandeno	Swimming	Women's 800 m freestyle	September 22
Bronze	Cheryl Haworth	Weightlifting	Women's +75 kg	September 22
Bronze	Karen Kraft; Missy Schwen-Ryan	Rowing	Women's pair	September 23
Bronze	James Graves	Shooting	Men's skeet	September 23
Bronze	Chris Thompson	Swimming	Men's 1500 m freestyle	September 23
Bronze	Dara Torres	Swimming	Women's 50 m freestyle	September 23
Bronze	Christine Collins; Sarah Garner	Rowing	Women's lightweight double sculls	September 24
Bronze	Mark Crear	Athletics	Men's 110 m hurdles	September 25
Bronze	Charles McKee; Jonathan McKee	Sailing	49er	September 25
Bronze	Susan Blinks; Robert Dover; Guenter Seidel; Christine Traurig	Equestrian	Team dressage	September 26
Bronze	Garrett Lowney	Wrestling	Men's Greco-Roman 97 kg	September 26
Bronze	Melissa Morrison	Athletics	Women's 100 m hurdles	September 27
Bronze	Chris Huffins	Athletics	Men's decathlon	September 28
Bronze	Clarence Vinson	Boxing	Bantamweight	September 28
Bronze	Monica Seles	Tennis	Women's singles	September 28
Bronze	Jermain Taylor	Boxing	Light middleweight	September 29
Bronze	Chryste Gaines; Torri Edwards; Nanceen Perry; Passion Richardson^{[a]}	Athletics	Women's 4 × 100 m relay	September 30
Bronze	Terry Brands	Wrestling	Men's freestyle 58 kg	October 1
Bronze	Lincoln McIlravy	Wrestling	Men's freestyle 69 kg	October 1

Medals by sport
Sport	1st place, gold medalist(s)	2nd place, silver medalist(s)	3rd place, bronze medalist(s)	Total
Swimming	14	8	11	**33**
Athletics	7	4	5	**16**
Wrestling	2	2	3	**7**
Tennis	2	0	1	**3**
Basketball	2	0	0	**2**
Sailing	1	2	1	**4**
Cycling	1	1	0	**2**
Equestrian	1	0	2	**3**
Shooting	1	0	2	**3**
Weightlifting	1	0	1	**2**
Baseball	1	0	0	**1**
Diving	1	0	0	**1**
Softball	1	0	0	**1**
Taekwondo	1	0	0	**1**
Volleyball	1	0	0	**1**
Boxing	0	2	2	**4**
Modern pentathlon	0	1	0	**1**
Soccer	0	1	0	**1**
Water polo	0	1	0	**1**
Rowing	0	1	2	**3**
Archery	0	1	1	**2**
Gymnastics	0	0	1	**1**
Total	37	24	32	93

Medals by day
Day	Date	1st place, gold medalist(s)	2nd place, silver medalist(s)	3rd place, bronze medalist(s)	Total
1	September 16	2	1	1	**4**
2	September 17	2	2	1	**5**
3	September 18	2	0	0	**2**
4	September 19	3	1	4	**8**
5	September 20	2	4	5	**11**
6	September 21	1	1	0	**2**
7	September 22	5	1	4	**10**
8	September 23	2	2	4	**8**
9	September 24	1	1	1	**3**
10	September 25	3	1	2	**6**
11	September 26	1	1	2	**4**
12	September 27	4	0	1	**5**
13	September 28	2	3	3	**8**
14	September 29	1	1	1	**3**
15	September 30	5	2	1	**8**
16	October 1	1	3	2	**6**
Total		37	24	32	93

Medals by gender
Gender	1st place, gold medalist(s)	2nd place, silver medalist(s)	3rd place, bronze medalist(s)	Total	Percentage
Male	21	17	15	**53**	56.99%
Female	16	7	15	**38**	40.86%
Mixed	0	0	2	**2**	2.15%
Total	37	24	32	93	100%

Multiple medalists
Name	Sport	1st place, gold medalist(s)	2nd place, silver medalist(s)	3rd place, bronze medalist(s)	Total
Dara Torres	Swimming	2	0	3	**5**
Gary Hall Jr.	Swimming	2	1	1	**5**
Jenny Thompson	Swimming	3	0	1	**4**
Lenny Krayzelburg	Swimming	3	0	0	**3**
Brooke Bennett	Swimming	2	0	0	**2**
Maurice Greene	Athletics	2	0	0	**2**
Megan Quann	Swimming	2	0	0	**2**
Courtney Shealy	Swimming	2	0	0	**2**
Ashley Tappin	Swimming	2	0	0	**2**
Amy Van Dyken	Swimming	2	0	0	**2**
Venus Williams	Tennis	2	0	0	**2**
Tom Dolan	Swimming	1	1	0	**2**
Anthony Ervin	Swimming	1	1	0	**2**
Jason Lezak	Swimming	1	1	0	**2**
Ed Moses	Swimming	1	1	0	**2**
Diana Munz	Swimming	1	1	0	**2**
Neil Walker	Swimming	1	1	0	**2**
David O'Connor	Equestrian	1	0	1	**2**
Josh Davis	Swimming	0	2	0	**2**
Klete Keller	Swimming	0	1	1	**2**
Vic Wunderle	Archery	0	1	1	**2**

^{a} Athletes who participated in the heats only.

== Archery ==
All three of the American men won their first matches. Two were defeated in the second round, but Vic Wunderle made it all the way to the finals before being defeated by home-crowd favorite Simon Fairweather. The squad was surprised by Italy in the team round semifinal, and was forced to shoot a tie-breaker against Russia in the bronze medal match to claim their medal. Karen Scavotto faced Denise Parker in the first round, guaranteeing an elimination for one of the American women.

Men

Athlete	Event	Ranking round		Round of 64	Round of 32	Round of 16	Quarterfinal	Semifinal	Final / BM	
Athlete	Event	Score	Seed	Opposition Result	Opposition Result	Opposition Result	Opposition Result	Opposition Result	Opposition Result	Rank
Butch Johnson	Individual	627	31	Koprivnikar (SLO); W 164–151	Oh (KOR); L 160–166	Did not advance				
Rod White	Individual	651	4	Latil (VAN); W 158–145	van Zutphen (NED); L 152–153	Did not advance				
Vic Wunderle	Individual	643	7	Merlos (ESA); W 160–150	Antonov (UKR); W 152–151	Shikarev (KAZ); W 171–166	Oh (KOR); W 108–105	Petersson (SWE); W 108–107	Fairweather (AUS); L 106–113	2nd place, silver medalist(s)
Butch Johnson; Rod White; Vic Wunderle	Team	1921	2	—N/a		Bye	Sweden; W 255–244	Italy; L 241–244	Bronze medal final Russia; W 239 (+29)–239 (+26)	3rd place, bronze medalist(s)

Women

Athlete	Event	Ranking round		Round of 64	Round of 32	Round of 16	Quarterfinal	Semifinal	Final / BM	
Athlete	Event	Score	Seed	Opposition Result	Opposition Result	Opposition Result	Opposition Result	Opposition Result	Opposition Result	Rank
Janet Dykman	Individual	636	16	Tremelling (AUS); L 146–154	Did not advance					
Denise Parker	Individual	619	43	Scavotto (USA); L 152–162	Did not advance					
Karen Scavotto	Individual	634	22	Parker (USA); W 162–152	Pérez (CUB); W 158–155	Kawauchi (JPN); L 157–159	Did not advance			
Janet Dykman; Denise Parker; Karen Scavotto	Team	1889	9	—N/a		Sweden; W 242–230	South Korea; L 240–252	Did not advance		

== Athletics ==
Key

- Note–Ranks given for track events are within the athlete's heat only
- Q = Qualified for the next round by position in race or, in field events, by achieving the automatic qualification target
- q = Qualified for the next round as a fastest loser or, in field events, by position without achieving the qualifying target

Men
Track and road events

Athlete	Event	Heat		Quarterfinal		Semifinal		Final	
Athlete	Event	Time	Rank	Time	Rank	Time	Rank	Time	Rank
Jon Drummond	100 m	10.20	1 Q	10.15	2 Q	10.10	2 Q	10.09	5
Maurice Greene	100 m	10.31	1 Q	10.10	1 Q	10.06	1 Q	9.87	1st place, gold medalist(s)
Curtis Johnson	100 m	10.30	1 Q	10.24	2 Q	10.27	6	Did not advance	
John Capel	200 m	20.49	1 Q	20.13	1 Q	20.10	1 Q	20.49	8
Floyd Heard	200 m	20.68	1 Q	20.24	1 Q	20.63	6	Did not advance	
Coby Miller	200 m	20.49	1 Q	20.37	2 Q	20.45	4 Q	20.35	7
Alvin Harrison	400 m	44.96	1 Q	44.25	1 Q	44.53	1 Q	44.40	2nd place, silver medalist(s)
Michael Johnson	400 m	45.25	1 Q	45.31	1 Q	44.65	2 Q	43.84	1st place, gold medalist(s)
Antonio Pettigrew	400 m	45.62	1 Q	45.35	2 Q	45.24	1 Q	~~45.42~~	DSQ^{[c]}
Mark Everett	800 m	1:49.77	5	—N/a		Did not advance			
Rich Kenah	800 m	1:47.85	6	—N/a		Did not advance			
Bryan Woodward	800 m	1:47.64	5	—N/a		Did not advance			
Gabe Jennings	1500 m	3:40:96	6 Q	—N/a		3:40.10	9	Did not advance	
Jason Pyrah	1500 m	3:38.94	7 q	—N/a		3:40.04	3 Q	3:39.84	10
Michael Stember	1500 m	3:39:13	6 Q	—N/a		3:42.30	9	Did not advance	
Adam Goucher	5000 m	13:24.34	7 q	—N/a				13:43.20	13
Bradley Hauser	5000 m	13:39.41	11	—N/a				Did not advance	
Nicholas Rogers	5000 m	13:46.18	12	—N/a				Did not advance	
Abdihakem Abdirahman	10,000 m	28:09.04	7 Q	—N/a				27:46.17	10
Alan Culpepper	10,000 m	29:00.71	17	—N/a				Did not advance	
Meb Keflezighi	10,000 m	27:58.96	11 q	—N/a				27:53.63	12
Mark Crear	110 m hurdles	13.44	1 Q	13.60	3 Q	13.23	2 Q	13.22	3rd place, bronze medalist(s)
Allen Johnson	110 m hurdles	13.50	1 Q	13.55	2 Q	13.34	2 Q	13.23	4
Terrence Trammell	110 m hurdles	13.59	3 Q	13.29	2 Q	13.32	1 Q	13.22	2nd place, silver medalist(s)
James Carter	400 m hurdles	49.41	2 Q	—N/a		48.48	1 Q	48.04	4
Angelo Taylor	400 m hurdles	49.48	1 Q	—N/a		48.49	2 Q	47.50	1st place, gold medalist(s)
Eric Thomas	400 m hurdles	50.16	2 Q	—N/a		49.25	5	Did not advance	
Anthony Cosey	3000 m steeplechase	8:35.25	10	—N/a				Did not advance	
Mark Croghan	3000 m steeplechase	8:25.88	5	—N/a				Did not advance	
Pascal Dobert	3000 m steeplechase	8:29.52	6	—N/a				Did not advance	
Kenneth Brokenburr^{[b]} Jon Drummond; Maurice Greene; Brian Lewis; Tim Montgomery^{[b]} Bernard Williams	4 × 100 m relay	38.15	1 Q	—N/a		37.82	1 Q	37.61	1st place, gold medalist(s)
Alvin Harrison; Calvin Harrison; Michael Johnson; Antonio Pettigrew; Angelo Taylor^{[b]} Jerome Young^{[b]}	4 × 400 m relay	3:03.52	1 Q	—N/a		2:58.78	1 Q	~~2:56.34~~	DSQ^{[c]}
Rod DeHaven	Marathon	—N/a						2:30:46	69
Tim Seaman	20 km walk	—N/a						1:30:32	40
Curt Clausen	50 km walk	—N/a						3:58:39	22
Philip Dunn	50 km walk	—N/a						4:03:05	28
Andrew Hermann	50 km walk	—N/a						4:07:18	31

^{c} - The United States was initially stripped of the relay gold medal on July 18, 2004, after Young was deemed ineligible to have competed in Sydney due to doping violations. The medals were returned to all athletes, except Young, on July 22, 2005 when the Court of Arbitration for Sport ruled that the IAAF and IOC rules in 2000 did not call for the disqualification of an entire team due to the doping offenses of one athlete. Later, the medals were stripped again on August 2, 2008, after Pettigrew admitted to also using performance enhancing drugs. Pettigrew's individual results were also nullified.

Field events

Athlete	Event	Qualification		Final	
Athlete	Event	Result	Rank	Result	Rank
Melvin Lister	Long jump	7.82	25	Did not advance	
Dwight Phillips	Long jump	8.13	3 q	8.06	8
Savanté Stringfellow	Long jump	7.84	22	Did not advance	
LaMark Carter	Triple jump	16.47	19	Did not advance	
Walter Davis	Triple jump	16.75	12 q	16.61	11
Robert Howard	Triple jump	16.93	=9 q	17.05	7
Charles Austin	High jump	2.20	20	Did not advance	
Kenny Evans	High jump	2.27	12 q	2.20	13
Nathan Leeper	High jump	2.27	6 q	2.25	11
Chad Harting	Pole vault	5.40	=26	Did not advance	
Nick Hysong	Pole vault	5.70	1 q	5.90	1st place, gold medalist(s)
Lawrence Johnson	Pole vault	5.65	=12 q	5.90	2nd place, silver medalist(s)
Andy Bloom	Shot put	19.83	11 q	20.87	4
John Godina	Shot put	20.58	2 Q	21.20	3rd place, bronze medalist(s)
Adam Nelson	Shot put	20.12	4 Q	21.21	2nd place, silver medalist(s)
John Godina	Discus throw	61.76	17	did not advance	
Adam Setliff	Discus throw	63.25	10 q	66.02	5
Anthony Washington	Discus throw	62.82	11 q	59.87	12
Breaux Greer	Javelin throw	82.63	11 q	79.91	12
Lance Deal	Hammer throw	75.61	16	Did not advance	
Jud Logan	Hammer throw	68.42	39	Did not advance	
Kevin McMahon	Hammer throw	69.48	36	Did not advance	

Combined events – Decathlon

Athlete	Event	100 m	LJ	SP	HJ	400 m	110H	DT	PV	JT	1500 m	Final	Rank
Chris Huffins	Result	10.48	7.71	15.27	2.09	48.31	13.91	49.55	4.70	56.62	4:38.71	8595	3rd place, bronze medalist(s)
Chris Huffins	Points	980	987	806	887	894	986	861	819	687	688	8595	3rd place, bronze medalist(s)
Kip Janvrin	Event	11.26	6.63	13.57	1.85	49.12	15.15	42.20	5.00	56.84	4:17.81	7726	21
Kip Janvrin	Points	804	727	702	670	856	831	709	910	690	827	7726	21
Tom Pappas	Event	10.82	7.41	14.87	2.21	48.64	14.15	41.42	4.90	62.26	4:45.10	8425	5
Tom Pappas	Points	901	913	782	1002	878	955	693	880	772	649	8425	5

Women
Track and road events

Athlete	Event	Heat		Quarterfinal		Semifinal		Final	
Athlete	Event	Result	Rank	Result	Rank	Result	Rank	Result	Rank
Torri Edwards	100 m	11.34	3 Q	11.32	5	Did not advance			
Chryste Gaines	100 m	11.06	1 Q	11.21	2 Q	11.23	5	Did not advance	
Marion Jones^{[d]}	100 m	11.20	1 Q	10.83	1 Q	11.01	1 Q	~~10.75~~	DSQ
Torri Edwards	200 m	23.29	3 Q	22.98	3 Q	23.06	6	Did not advance	
Marion Jones^{[d]}	200 m	22.75	1 Q	22.50	2 Q	22.40	1 Q	~~21.84~~	DSQ
Nanceen Perry	200 m	23.18	3 Q	22.95	4 Q	23.16	8	Did not advance	
LaTasha Colander	400 m	51.75	1 Q	53.45	5	Did not advance			
Michelle Collins	400 m	53.66	4	Did not advance					
Monique Hennagan	400 m	51.73	2 Q	51.85	6	Did not advance			
Joetta Clark Diggs	800 m	2:00.18	4 q	—N/a		2:04.12	8	Did not advance	
Hazel Clark-Riley	800 m	2:01.99	2 Q	—N/a		1:59.12	5 q	1:58.75	7
Jearl Miles Clark	800 m	2:01.79	1 Q	—N/a		1:59.44	5	Did not advance	
Shayne Culpepper	1500 m	4:12.52	9	—N/a		Did not advance			
Suzy Favor-Hamilton	1500 m	4:08.08	1 Q	—N/a		4:05.25	2 Q	4:23.05	12
Marla Runyan	1500 m	4:10.83	7 q	—N/a		4:06:14	6 q	4:08.30	8
Elva Dryer	5000 m	15:23.99	7	—N/a				Did not advance	
Anne Marie Lauck	5000 m	15:47.78	11	—N/a				Did not advance	
Amy Rudolph	5000 m	15:28.91	7	—N/a				Did not advance	
Deena Drossin-Kastor	10,000 m	34:40.86	18	—N/a				Did not advance	
Libbie Hickman	10,000 m	32:59.28	10 q	—N/a				31:56.94	16
Jenn Rhines	10,000 m	34:08.28	16	—N/a				Did not advance	
Sharon Couch	100 m hurdles	12.92	2 Q	12.78	2 Q	13.00	6	Did not advance	
Gail Devers	100 m hurdles	12.62	1 Q	12.77	1 Q	DNF		Did not advance	
Melissa Morrison	100 m hurdles	12.91	2 Q	12.76	1 Q	12.84	2 Q	12.76	3rd place, bronze medalist(s)
Kim Batten	400 m hurdles	55.28	2 Q	—N/a		55.73	6	Did not advance	
Tonja Buford-Bailey	400 m hurdles	57.02	4	—N/a		Did not advance			
Sandra Glover	400 m hurdles	55.76	1 Q	—N/a		54.98	6	Did not advance	
Torri Edwards; Chryste Gaines; ~~Marion Jones~~^{[d]} Nanceen Perry; Passion Richardson^{[b]}	4 × 100 m relay	42.92	1 Q	—N/a		42.82	2 Q	42.20	3rd place, bronze medalist(s)
Andrea Anderson^{[b]} LaTasha Colander; Monique Hennagan; ~~Marion Jones~~^{[d]} Jearl Miles Clark	4 × 400 m relay	3:23.95	1 Q	—N/a				3:22.62	1st place, gold medalist(s)
Christine Clark	Marathon	—N/a						2:31:35	19
Chen Yueling	20 km walk	—N/a						1:39.36	38
Debbi Lawrence	20 km walk	—N/a						1:47.20	44
Michelle Rohl	20 km walk	—N/a						1:34.26	17

^{b} - Athlete that ran in the heats but not the final.
^{d} - Jones was stripped of her medals on December 12, 2007, after she admitted to taking performance enhancing drugs prior to the 2000 Olympics. Both relay teams were further disqualified and stripped of their medals by the IOC on April 10, 2008. The athletes appealed to the Court of Arbitration for Sport, which restored medals to all teammembers, except Jones, on July 16, 2010 because the IAAF and IOC rules in 2000 did not call for the disqualification of an entire team due to the doping offenses of one athlete.

Field events

Athlete	Event	Qualification		Final	
Athlete	Event	Result	Rank	Result	Rank
Dawn Burrell	Long jump	6.77	4 Q	6.38	10
Marion Jones^{[d]}	Long jump	DSQ			
Shana Williams	Long jump	6.44	20	Did not advance	
Nicole Gamble	Triple jump	13.33	25	Did not advance	
Amy Acuff	High jump	1.80	31	Did not advance	
Erin Aldrich	High jump	1.85	26	Did not advance	
Karol Damon	High jump	1.89	24	Did not advance	
Stacy Dragila	Pole vault	4.30	11 q	4.60 OR	1st place, gold medalist(s)
Melissa Mueller	Pole vault	4.25	14	Did not advance	
Kellie Suttle	Pole vault	4.30	=1 q	4.00	11
Jesseca Cross	Shot put	17.27	17	Did not advance	
Connie Price-Smith	Shot put	17.42	16	Did not advance	
Teri Tunks	Shot put	16.34	22	Did not advance	
Kris Kuehl	Discus throw	59.45	18	Did not advance	
Suzy Powell-Roos	Discus throw	59.68	15	Did not advance	
Seilala Sua	Discus throw	61.88	7 q	59.85	10
Lynda Blutreich	Javelin throw	55.25	26	Did not advance	
Jesseca Cross	Hammer throw	60.85	19	Did not advance	
Dawn Ellerbe	Hammer throw	64.91	6 q	66.80	7
Amy Palmer	Hammer throw	62.78	12 q	66.15	8

Combined events – Heptatlon

Athlete	Event	100H	HJ	SP	200 m	LJ	JT	800 m	Final	Rank
Shelia Burrell	Event	13.30	NM	13.32	24.01	6.05	43.72	2:21.22	5345	26
Shelia Burrell	Points	1080	0	749	980	865	739	932	5345	26
DeDee Nathan	Event	13.74	1.78	14.22	24.84	6.06	43.48	2:16.67	6150	9
DeDee Nathan	Points	1015	953	809	902	868	734	869	6150	9

== Badminton ==
Athlete	Event	Round of 64	Round of 32	Round of 16	Quarterfinals	Semifinals	Final / BM	
Athlete	Event	Opposition Result	Opposition Result	Opposition Result	Opposition Result	Opposition Result	Opposition Result	Rank
Kevin Han	Men's singles	Bye	Beres (CAN); W 15–5, 15–3	Ji (CHN); L 3–15, 6–15	Did not advance			

== Baseball ==
Baseball was open only to male amateurs in 1992 and 1996. As a result, the Americans and other nations where professional baseball is developed relied on collegiate players, while Cubans used their most experienced veterans, who technically were considered amateurs as they nominally held other jobs, but in fact trained full-time. In 2000, pros were admitted, but the MLB refused to release its players in 2000, 2004, and 2008, and the situation changed only a little: the Cubans still used their best players, while the Americans started using minor leaguers. The IOC cited the absence of the best players as the main reason for baseball being dropped from the Olympic program.

Summary

Team	Event	Preliminary round								Semifinal	Final / BM	
Team	Event	Opposition Score	Opposition Score	Opposition Score	Opposition Score	Opposition Score	Opposition Score	Opposition Score	Rank	Opposition Score	Opposition Score	Rank
United States men	Men's tournament	Japan; W 4–2 (F/13)	South Africa; W 11–1 (F/7)	Netherlands; W 6–2	South Korea; W 4–0	Italy; W 4–2	Cuba; L 1–6	Australia; W 12–1 (F/7)	2 Q	South Korea; W 3–2	Cuba; W 4–0	1st place, gold medalist(s)

Roster

USA Baseball Olympic Team roster
Players		Coaches
Pitchers: 20 Kurt Ainsworth; 31 Ryan Franklin; 32 Chris George; 36 Shane Heams; 33 Rick Krivda; 25 Roy Oswalt; 23 Jon Rauch; 27 Bobby Seay; 28 Ben Sheets; 29 Todd Williams; 30 Tim Young	Catchers: 14 Pat Borders; 15 Marcus Jensen; Infielders: 5 Brent Abernathy; 10 Sean Burroughs; 22 John Cotton; 7 Travis Dawkins; 8 Adam Everett; 18 Mike Kinkade; 16 Doug Mientkiewicz; Outfielders: 24 Mike Neill; 26 Anthony Sanders; 12 Brad Wilkerson; 19 Ernie Young	Manager: 2 Tommy Lasorda; Coaches: 9 Reggie Smith (Hitting); 34 Phil Regan (Pitching); 1 Eddie Rodríguez (Bench/3rd Base); 35 Ray Tanner (Auxiliary Coach); 4 Dick Cooke (Auxiliary Coach)

Preliminary round

Pos	Team	Pld	W	L	RF	RA	RD	PCT	GB	Qualification
1	Cuba	7	6	1	50	17	+33	.857 (Note: Cuba defeated the United States 6–1.)	—	Advance to knockout round
2	United States	7	6	1	42	14	+28	.857	—	Advance to knockout round
3	South Korea	7	4	3	40	26	+14	.571 (Note: South Korea defeated Japan 7–6.)	2	Advance to knockout round
4	Japan	7	4	3	41	23	+18	.571	2	Advance to knockout round
5	Netherlands	7	3	4	19	29	−10	.429	3	
6	Italy	7	2	5	33	43	−10	.286 (Note: Italy defeated Australia 8–7.)	4	
7	Australia (H)	7	2	5	30	41	−11	.286	4	
8	South Africa	7	1	6	11	73	−62	.143	5	

(H) Hosts
Notes:

17 September	United States	4–2 (F/13)	Japan	Sydney Baseball Stadium; Attendance: 13,404
17 September		Boxscore		Sydney Baseball Stadium; Attendance: 13,404

18 September	United States	11–1 (F/7)	South Africa	Blacktown Olympic Park; Attendance: 3,474
18 September		Boxscore		Blacktown Olympic Park; Attendance: 3,474

19 September	Netherlands	2–6	United States	Blacktown Olympic Park; Attendance: 3,352
19 September		Boxscore		Blacktown Olympic Park; Attendance: 3,352

20 September	United States	4–0	South Korea	Sydney Baseball Stadium; Attendance: 13,818
20 September		Boxscore		Sydney Baseball Stadium; Attendance: 13,818

22 September	United States	4–2	Italy	Sydney Baseball Stadium; Attendance: 13,912
22 September		Boxscore		Sydney Baseball Stadium; Attendance: 13,912

23 September	Cuba	6–1	United States	Sydney Baseball Stadium; Attendance: 14,010
23 September		Boxscore		Sydney Baseball Stadium; Attendance: 14,010

24 September	Australia	1–12 (F/7)	United States	Sydney Baseball Stadium; Attendance: 14,018
24 September		Boxscore		Sydney Baseball Stadium; Attendance: 14,018

Semifinal

26 September	United States	3–2	South Korea	Sydney Baseball Stadium; Attendance: 14,002

Gold medal game

27 September	Cuba	0 – 4	United States	Sydney Baseball Stadium; Attendance: 14,107

== Basketball ==
Summary

Team	Event	Group stage						Quarterfinal	Semifinal	Final / BM	
Team	Event	Opposition Score	Opposition Score	Opposition Score	Opposition Score	Opposition Score	Rank	Opposition Score	Opposition Score	Opposition Score	Rank
United States men	Men's tournament	China; W 119–72	Italy; W 93–61	Lithuania; W 85–76	New Zealand; W 102–56	France; W 106–94	1 Q	Russia; W 85–75	Lithuania; W 85–83	France; W 85–75	1st place, gold medalist(s)
United States women	Women's tournament	South Korea; W 89–75	Cuba; W 90–61	Russia; W 88–77	New Zealand; W 93–42	Poland; W 76–57	1 Q	Slovakia; W 58–43	South Korea; W 78–65	Australia; W 76–54	1st place, gold medalist(s)

=== Men ===
Roster

United States men's national basketball team roster
Players
Coaches

Pos.	No.	Name	Age – Date of birth	Height	Club	Ctr.
SG	4	Steve Smith	31 – May 31, 1969	2.03 m (6 ft 8 in)	Portland Trail Blazers	(United States)
PG	5	Jason Kidd	27 – March 23, 1973	1.93 m (6 ft 4 in)	Phoenix Suns	(United States)
SG	6	Allan Houston	29 – April 20, 1971	1.98 m (6 ft 6 in)	New York Knicks	(United States)
C	7	Alonzo Mourning	30 – February 8, 1970	2.08 m (6 ft 10 in)	Miami Heat	(United States)
PG	8	Tim Hardaway	34 – September 1, 1966	1.83 m (6 ft 0 in)	Miami Heat	(United States)
G/F	9	Vince Carter	23 – January 26, 1977	1.98 m (6 ft 6 in)	Toronto Raptors	(Canada)
PF	10	Kevin Garnett	24 – May 19, 1976	2.11 m (6 ft 11 in)	Minnesota Timberwolves	(United States)
F/C	11	Vin Baker	28 – November 23, 1971	2.11 m (6 ft 11 in)	Seattle SuperSonics	(United States)
SG	12	Ray Allen	25 – July 20, 1975	1.96 m (6 ft 5 in)	Milwaukee Bucks	(United States)
F/C	13	Antonio McDyess	26 – September 7, 1974	2.06 m (6 ft 9 in)	Denver Nuggets	(United States)
PG	14	Gary Payton	32 – July 23, 1968	1.93 m (6 ft 4 in)	Seattle SuperSonics	(United States)
PF	15	Shareef Abdur-Rahim	23 – December 11, 1976	2.06 m (6 ft 9 in)	Vancouver Grizzlies	(Canada)

Head coach

- (United States) Rudy Tomjanovich

Assistant coach(es)

- (United States) Larry Brown
- (United States) Gene Keady
- (United States) Tubby Smith

Group play

Team	W	L	PF	PA	PD	Pts	Tiebreaker
United States	5	0	505	359	+146	10	
Italy	3	2	332	349	-17	8	1-0
Lithuania	3	2	372	339	+33	8	0-1
France	2	3	372	374	+2	7	1-0
China	2	3	368	419	-51	7	0-1
New Zealand	0	5	307	416	-109	5	

September 17, 2000
21:30

China	72–119	United States
Scoring by half: 38–60, 34–59
Pts: Wang 13; Rebs: Guo 5 Asts: Guo 6		Pts: Allen 21; Rebs: Garnett 8 Asts: Payton 7

The Dome, Sydney
Attendance: 8,319

September 19, 2000
16:30

United States	93–61	Italy
Scoring by half: 45–35, 48–26
Pts: Carter 13; Rebs: Garnett 9 Asts: Kidd 7		Pts: Myers 11; Rebs: Meneghin 6 Asts: Meneghin 4

The Dome, Sydney
Attendance: 8,368

September 21, 2000
16:30

United States	85–76	Lithuania
Scoring by half: 47–41, 38–35
Pts: Payton 14; Rebs: Garnett 11; Asts: 4 players, 2 each		Pts: Songaila 16; Rebs: Songaila 8 Asts: Jasikevičius 6

The Dome, Sydney
Attendance: 8,391

September 23, 2000
19:30

New Zealand	56–102	United States
Scoring by half: 32–58, 24–44
Pts: Marks 10; Rebs: Marks 6 Asts: Henare 3		Pts: Carter 18; Rebs: Garnett 6 Asts: Kidd 6

The Dome, Sydney
Attendance: 8,392

September 25, 2000
16:30

France	94–106	United States
Scoring by half: 48–59, 46–47
Pts: Sciarra 21; Rebs: Bonato, Risacher 3 each Asts: Sciarra 4		Pts: McDyess 20; Rebs: Garnett, McDyess 11 each Asts: Kidd 6

The Dome, Sydney
Attendance: 8,477

Quarterfinal

September 28, 2000
22:00

United States	85–75	Russia
Scoring by half: 46–41, 39–29
Pts: Garnett 16; Rebs: Garnett 11; Asts: Kidd 8		Pts: Bashminov 12; Rebs: Morgunov 6 Asts: E. Pashutin 6

Sydney SuperDome, Sydney
Attendance: 14,260
Referees: Iztok Rems (Slovenia)
Rick Degagne (Canada)

Semifinal

September 29, 2000
21:30

Lithuania	83–85	United States
Scoring by half: 36–48, 47–37
Pts: Jasikevičius 27; Rebs: Štombergas Žukauskas 5 each Asts: Jasikevičius 4		Pts: Carter 18; Rebs: Garnett 14; Asts: Garnett 4

Sydney SuperDome, Sydney
Attendance: 14,653
Referees: Tiziano Zancanella (Italy)
Pascal Dorizon (France)

Gold medal game

October 1, 2000
13:15

France	75–85	United States
Scoring by half: 32-46, 43-39
Pts: Sciarra 19; Rebs: Sciarra 4 Asts: Sciarra 4		Pts: Allen, Carter 13 each Rebs: Kidd, Mourning 7 each Asts: Payton 3

Sydney SuperDome, Sydney
Attendance: 14,833
Referees: Romualdas Brazauskas (Lithuania)
Renato Santos (Brazil)

=== Women ===
Squad

United States women's national basketball team roster
Players
Coaches

Pos.	No.	Name	Age – Date of birth	Height	Club	Ctr.
G	4	Teresa Edwards	36 – July 19, 1964	1.80 m (5 ft 11 in)
G	5	Dawn Staley	30 – May 4, 1970	1.68 m (5 ft 6 in)	Charlotte Sting	(United States)
G	6	Ruthie Bolton-Holfield	33 – May 25, 1967	1.75 m (5 ft 9 in)	Sacramento Monarchs	(United States)
G/F	7	Sheryl Swoopes	29 – March 25, 1971	1.83 m (6 ft 0 in)	Houston Comets	(United States)
F	8	Delisha Milton	26 – September 11, 1974	1.85 m (6 ft 1 in)	Los Angeles Sparks	(United States)
C	9	Lisa Leslie	28 – July 7, 1972	1.96 m (6 ft 5 in)	Los Angeles Sparks	(United States)
F	10	Chamique Holdsclaw	23 – August 9, 1977	1.88 m (6 ft 2 in)	Washington Mystics	(United States)
C	11	Kara Wolters	25 – August 15, 1975	2.01 m (6 ft 7 in)	Indiana Fever	(United States)
F	12	Natalie Williams	29 – November 30, 1970	1.90 m (6 ft 3 in)	Utah Starzz	(United States)
C	13	Yolanda Griffith	30 – March 1, 1970	1.91 m (6 ft 3 in)	Sacramento Monarchs	(United States)
G	14	Katie Smith	26 – June 4, 1974	1.80 m (5 ft 11 in)	Minnesota Lynx	(United States)
PF	15	Nikki McCray	28 – December 17, 1971	1.80 m (5 ft 11 in)	Washington Mystics	(United States)

Head coach

- (United States) Nell Fortner

Assistant coach(es)

- (United States) Geno Auriemma
- (United States) Peggy Gillom

Group play

Team	W	L	PF	PA	PD	Pts	Tie
United States	5	0	446	312	+134	10	
Russia	3	2	398	325	+73	8	1.30
South Korea	3	2	343	296	+47	8	0.91
Poland	3	2	327	339	–12	8	0.84
Cuba	1	4	318	358	–40	6	
New Zealand	0	5	304	396	–92	5	

September 16, 2000
21:30

South Korea	75–89	United States
Scoring by half: 43–53, 32–36
Pts: Jung 17; Rebs: Kim 4 Asts: Park 3		Pts: Swoopes 29; Rebs: Leslie 11; Asts: Edwards, Staley 4 each

The Dome, Sydney
Attendance: 6,939

September 18, 2000
16:30

United States	90–61	Cuba
Scoring by half: 48–42, 42–19
Pts: Smith 15; Rebs: Griffith, Williams 7 each Asts: Staley 8		Pts: Martínez 19; Rebs: Martínez, Molinet 4 each Asts: Castillo 5

The Dome, Sydney
Attendance: 7,298

September 20, 2000
16:30

United States	88–77	Russia
Scoring by half: 44–47, 44–30
Pts: Leslie 18; Rebs: Griffith 11; Asts: Edwards, Swoopes 3 each		Pts: Arkhipova 15; Rebs: Zasulskaya 6 Asts: Zasulskaya 5

The Dome, Sydney
Attendance: 8,383

September 22, 2000
16:30

New Zealand	42–93	United States
Scoring by half: 17–47, 25–46
Pts: Farmer 9 Rebs: Ofsoski 6 Asts: Farmer 3		Pts: Smith 14; Rebs: Williams 7 Asts: Bolton-Holfield 6

The Dome, Sydney
Attendance: 8,297

September 24, 2000
19:30

United States	76–57	Poland
Scoring by half: 44–21, 32–36
Pts: Griffith, Swoopes 16; Rebs: Griffith 12; Asts: Leslie 4		Pts: Dydek 24; Rebs: Dydek 10; Asts: Predehl 2

The Dome, Sydney
Attendance: 8,471

Quarterfinal

September 27, 2000
22:00

United States	58–43	Slovakia
Scoring by half: 32–23, 26–20
Pts: Leslie 18; Rebs: Griffith 11; Asts: Three players 3 each		Pts: Luptáková 18; Rebs: Kotočová, Luptáková 7 each Asts: Žirková 2

Sydney SuperDome, Sydney
Attendance: 14,605
Referees:
Alexander Gorshkov (Russia)
Pilar Landeira (Spain)

Semifinal

September 29, 2000
16:30

South Korea	65–78	United States
Scoring by half: 40–42, 25–36
Pts: Park 14; Rebs: Chun 5 Asts: Chung 5		Pts: Swoopes 19; Rebs: Leslie 12; Asts: Swoopes 5

Sydney SuperDome, Sydney
Attendance: 14,698
Referees:
Romualdas Brazauskas (Lithuania)
Rick Degagne (Canada)

Gold medal game

September 30, 2000
20:00

Australia	54–76	United States
Scoring by half: 30-43, 24-33
Pts: Jackson 20; Rebs: Jackson 13; Asts: Harrower 2		Pts: Leslie, Williams 15 each Rebs: Griffith 12; Asts: Edwards 3

Sydney SuperDome, Sydney
Attendance: 14,978
Referees:
Nikolaos Pitsilkas (Greece)
Raúl Chaves (Argentina)

== Boxing ==
Athlete	Event	Round of 32	Round of 16	Quarterfinal	Semifinal	Final	
Athlete	Event	Opposition Result	Opposition Result	Opposition Result	Opposition Result	Opposition Result	Rank
Brian Viloria	Light flyweight	Kazakov (RUS); W 8–6	Asloum (FRA); L 4–6	Did not advance			
José Navarro	Flyweight	Ballo (INA); W 16–10	Mesbahi (MAR); W 12–9	Thomas (FRA); L 12–23	Did not advance		
Clarence Vinson	Bantamweight	Bouaita (FRA); W 9–2	Kadyraliev (KGZ); W 12–7	Olteanu (ROU); W 26–19	Rigondeaux (CUB); L 6–18	Did not advance	3rd place, bronze medalist(s)
Rocky Juarez	Featherweight	Batmani (IRI); W (RSC)	Huste (GER); W 17–15	Kamsing (THA); W (RSC)	Djamaloudinov (RUS); W 23–12	Sattarkhanov (KAZ); L 14–22	2nd place, silver medalist(s)
David Jackson	Lightweight	Ben Rabah (TUN); W 19–7	Palyani (TUR); L (w/o)	Did not advance			
Ricardo Williams	Light welterweight	Collins (AUS); W (RSC)	Olusegun (NIG); W (RSC)	Leonov (RUS); W 17–12	Luña (CUB); W 42–41	Abdoollayev (UZB); L 27–20	2nd place, silver medalist(s)
Dante Craig	Welterweight	Showban (EGY); W (RSC)	Ulusoy (TUR); L 9–4	Did not advance			
Jermain Taylor	Light middleweight	Usagin (BUL); W (RSC)	MacIntosh (CAN); W 23–9	Sturm (GER); W 19–14	Ibraimov (KAZ); W (RSC)	Did not advance	3rd place, bronze medalist(s)
Jeff Lacy	Middleweight	Conceição (BRA); W (RSC)	Kakietek (POL); W 21–7	Gaydarbekov (RUS); L (RSC)	Did not advance		
Olanda Anderson	Light heavyweight	Bye	Kraj (CZE); L 12–13	Did not advance			
Michael Bennett	Heavyweight	—N/a	Bartnik (POL); W 11–2	Savón (CUB); L (RSC)	Did not advance		
Calvin Brock	Super heavyweight	—N/a	Vidoz (ITA); L (RSC)	Did not advance			

== Canoeing ==
=== Slalom ===
Athlete	Event	Preliminary						Final					
Athlete	Event	Run 1	Rank	Run 2	Rank	Total	Rank	Run 1	Rank	Run 2	Rank	Total	Rank
David Hearn	Men's C-1	135.53	9	145.36	13	280.89	12 Q	127.12	12	131.45	12	258.57	12
Lecky Haller; Matt Taylor	Men's C-2	148.93	12	155.39	11	353.82	12	Did not advance					
Scott Shipley	Men's K-1	126.80	9	126.02	3	254.82	5 Q	112.99	6	113.68	9	226.67	5
Rebecca Giddens	Women's K-1	148.48	5	148.13	9	296.61	6 Q	129.26	7	129.43	7	258.69	7

=== Sprint ===
Men

Athlete	Event	Heat		Semifinal		Final	
Athlete	Event	Time	Rank	Time	Rank	Time	Rank
Jordan Malloch	Men's C-1 500 m	1:58.938	17	Did not advance			
Jordan Malloch	Men's C-1 1000 m	4:05.440	16	Did not advance			
Stein Jorgensen	Men's K-1 500 m	1:44.185	23 QS	1:44.182	23	Did not advance	
Peter Newton; Angel Pérez	Men's K-2 500 m	1:33.646	14 QS	1:31.082	3 QF	1:52.617	6
Philippe Boccara; Cliff Meidl	Men's K-2 1000 m	3:26.439	18	Did not advance			
Stein Jorgensen; John Mooney; Peter Newton; Angel Pérez	Men's K-4 1000 m	3:01.369	7 QF	Bye		2:59.472	6

Women

Athlete	Event	Heat		Semifinal		Final	
Athlete	Event	Time	Rank	Time	Rank	Time	Rank
Kathryn Colin	Women's K-1 500 m	1:55.373	11 QS	1:57.000	6	Did not advance	
Kathryn Colin; Tamara Jenkins	Women's K-2 500 m	1:47.735	11 QS	1:48.300	6	Did not advance	

Legend: QF – Qualify to final based on position in heat; QS – Qualify to semifinal based on time in round

== Cycling ==
=== Road ===
Men

Athlete	Event	Time	Rank
Lance Armstrong^{[e]}	Road race	~~5:30:37~~	DSQ
Antonio Cruz	Road race	5:30:46	53
Tyler Hamilton	Road race	5:30:46	49
George Hincapie	Road race	5:30:34	8
Fred Rodriguez	Road race	5:30:46	34
Lance Armstrong^{[e]}	Time trial	~~58:14~~	DSQ
Tyler Hamilton	Time trial	59:26	9^{*}

^{e} - Armstrong was stripped of the bronze medal, and all his results were removed, on January 17, 2013 after receiving a lifetime ban from all sports that follow WADA anti-doping rules.

Women

Athlete	Event	Time	Rank
Nicole Freedman	Road race	3:28:28	47
Mari Holden	Road race	DNF	
Karen Kurreck	Road race	DNF	
Mari Holden	Time trial	42:37	2nd place, silver medalist(s)
Karen Kurreck	Time trial	44:33	16

=== Track ===
Time trial

Athlete	Event	Time	Rank
Jonas Carney	Men's time trial	1:05.968	14
Chris Witty	Women's time trial	35.230	5

Sprint

Athlete	Event	Qualifying		1/16 finals	1/16 repechage	1/8 finals	1/8 repechage	Quarterfinal	Semifinal	Final / BM / Pl.	
Athlete	Event	Time Speed (km/h)	Rank	Opposition Time Speed (km/h)	Opposition Time Speed (km/h)	Opposition Time Speed (km/h)	Opposition Time Speed (km/h)	Opposition Time Speed (km/h)	Opposition Time Speed (km/h)	Opposition Time Speed (km/h)	Rank
Christian Arrue	Men's sprint	10.903; 66.037	18 Q	Nothstein (USA); L	Lepka (SVK); Nagatsuka (JPN); W 11.186; 64.366	Rousseau (FRA); L	Bērziņš (LAT); MacLean (GBR); L	Did not advance		Classification 9-12; Bērziņš (LAT); Buráň (CZE); Hill (AUS); L 3	11
Marty Nothstein	Men's sprint	10.166; 70.844	1 Q	Arrue (USA); W 10.956; 65.717	Bye	Eadie (AUS); W 10.799; 66.673	Bye	MacLean (GBR); W 10.888, W 10.973	Fiedler (GER); W 10.930, W 10.903	Rousseau (FRA); W 10.874, W 10.066	1st place, gold medalist(s)
Christian Arrue; John Bairos; Jonas Carney	Men's team sprint	46.337; 58.269	12	—N/a				Did not advance	—N/a	Did not advance	
Tanya Lindenmuth	Women's sprint	11.649; 61.808	8 Q	—N/a		Larreal (VEN); L	Freitag (GER); Ramage (NZL); W 12.275; 58.656	Ballanger (FRA); L	Did not advance	Classification 5-8; Dubnicoff (CAN); Larreal (VEN); Szabolsci (HUN); L 2	6

Pursuit

Athlete	Event	Qualifying		Quarterfinal		Semifinal		Final / BM	
Athlete	Event	Time	Rank	Opposition Time	Rank	Opposition Time	Rank	Opposition Time	Rank
Mariano Friedick	Men's individual pursuit	4:31.241	10	—N/a		Did not advance			
Christian Vande Velde	Men's individual pursuit	4:31.528	12	—N/a		Did not advance			
Derek Bouchard-Hall; Mariano Friedick; Erin Hartwell; Tommy Mulkey	Men's team pursuit	4:12.494	10	Did not advance					
Erin Mirabella	Women's individual pursuit	3:38.431	8	—N/a		Did not advance			

Points race

Athlete	Event	Points	Rank
Jamie Carney	Men's points race	10	5
Erin Mirabella	Women's points race	6	10

Keirin

Athlete	Event	First round	Repechage	Second round	Final
Athlete	Event	Rank	Rank	Rank	Rank
Christian Arrue	Men's keirin	6	5	Did not advance	
Marty Nothstein	Men's keirin	4	1 Q	1 Q	5

=== Mountain biking ===
Athlete	Event	Time	Rank
Travis Brown	Men's cross-country	02:32:02	32
Tinker Juarez	Men's cross-country	02:22:11	30
Alison Dunlap	Women's cross-country	1:53:53	7
Ruthie Matthes	Women's cross-country	1:55:16	10
Ann Trombley	Women's cross-country	1:59:43	16

== Diving ==
Laura Wilkinson staged a comeback during the finals of the Women's 10 metre platform and won the only diving medal for the United States during the 2000 Sydney Olympics. The Chinese divers were in first and second heading into the finals.

Men

Athlete	Event	Preliminary		Semifinal				Final		Total	
Athlete	Event	Points	Rank	Points	Rank	Total	Rank	Points	Rank	Points	Rank
Troy Dumais	3 m springboard	407.64	7 Q	224.16	8	631.80	7 Q	418.56	6	642.72	6
Mark Ruiz	3 m springboard	429.30	4 Q	227.97	5	657.27	4 Q	410.25	7	638.22	7
David Pichler	10 m platform	440.91	7 Q	187.89	7	628.80	7 Q	428.28	9	616.17	9
Mark Ruiz	10 m platform	432.36	10 Q	180.99	14	613.35	10 Q	444.93	6	625.92	6
Troy Dumais; David Pichler	3 m synchronized springboard	—N/a								320.91	4
David Pichler; Mark Ruiz	10 m synchronized platform	—N/a								321.69	7

Women

Athlete	Event	Preliminary		Semifinal				Final		Total	
Athlete	Event	Points	Rank	Points	Rank	Total	Rank	Points	Rank	Points	Rank
Michelle Davison	3 m springboard	280.26	10 Q	219.48	9	499.74	11 Q	291.00	12	510.48	12
Jenny Keim	3 m springboard	285.12	9 Q	225.90	8	511.02	8 Q	308.28	9	534.18	8
Sara Reiling	10 m platform	282.84	16 Q	164.07	12	446.91	13	Did not advance			13
Laura Wilkinson	10 m platform	331.20	5 Q	173.04	8	504.24	5 Q	370.71	1	543.75	1st place, gold medalist(s)
Jenny Keim; Laura Wilkinson	10 m synchronized platform	—N/a								291.42	5

== Equestrian ==
Dressage
(Total scores are the average of all three rounds for the individual competition, and the three best total scores of individual round 1 for the team competition.)

Athlete	Horse	Event	Grand Prix Test		Grand Prix Special			Grand Prix Freestyle		Total	
Athlete	Horse	Event	Score	Rank	Score	Total	Rank	Score	Rank	Score	Rank
Susan Blinks	Flim Flam	Individual	69.00	12 Q	71.20	140.20	12 Q	74.45	6	214.65	8
Robert Dover	Ranier	Individual	67.12	17 Q	63.90	131.02	23	Did not advance			23
Guenter Seidel	Foltaire	Individual	67.80	15 Q-T	Did not advance						26
Christine Traurig	Etienne	Individual	69.84	10 Q	70.93	140.77	10 Q	67.57	15	208.34	11
Susan Blinks; Robert Dover; Guenter Seidel; Christine Traurig	See above	Team	5166	3	—N/a					5166	3rd place, bronze medalist(s)

Eventing

Athlete	Horse	Event	Dressage		Cross-country		Show jumping		Total	
Athlete	Horse	Event	Penalties	Rank	Penalties	Rank	Penalties	Rank	Penalties	Rank
Julie Black	Hyde Park Corn	Individual	52.8	=22	0.8	12	0.0	=1	53.6	9
Robert Costello	Chevalier	Individual	42.4	9	0.0	=1	10.0	=13	52.4	8
David O'Connor	Custom Made	Individual	29.0	9	0.0	=1	5.0	=7	34.0	1st place, gold medalist(s)
Nina Fout; David O'Connor; Karen O'Connor; Linden Wiesman	3 Magic Beans; Giltedge; Prince Panache; Anderoo	Team	125.4	3	25.2	4	15.0	=1	175.8	3rd place, bronze medalist(s)

Jumping

Athlete	Horse	Event	Qualification								Final				Total	
Athlete	Horse	Event	Round 1		Round 2			Round 3			Round A		Round B		Total	
Athlete	Horse	Event	Penalties	Rank	Penalties	Total	Rank	Penalties	Total	Rank	Penalties	Rank	Penalties	Rank	Penalties	Rank
Nona Garson	Rhythmical	Individual	79.75	72	16.00	95.75	72	20.00	115.75	72	Did not advance					
Margie Goldstein-Engle	H.C. Perin	Individual	16.00	=49	0.00	16.00	=23	8.00	24.00	25 Q	4.00	=5 Q	8.00	=13	12.00	=10
Lauren Hough	Clasiko	Individual	12.50	=37	8.00	20.50	=37	8.00	28.50	32 Q	8.00	=14 Q	8.00	=13	16.00	=15
Laura Kraut	Liberty	Individual	8.00	=21	4.00	12.00	12	8.00	20.00	=18 Q	12.00	=20 Q	DNF		Did not advance	
Nona Garson; Margie Goldstein-Engle; Lauren Hough; Laura Kraut	See above	Team	—N/a		12.00	—N/a	=4 Q	24.00	36.00	12	—N/a				36.00	12

== Fencing ==
Men

Athlete	Event	Round of 64	Round of 32	Round of 16	Quarterfinal	Semifinal	Final / BM	
Athlete	Event	Opposition Result	Opposition Result	Opposition Result	Opposition Result	Opposition Result	Opposition Result	Rank
Cliff Bayer	Individual foil	Bye	Sobczak (POL); W 15–9	Kim (KOR); L 14–15	Did not advance			10
Tamir Bloom	Individual épée	—N/a	Schmitt (GER); L 12–15	Did not advance				29
Keeth Smart	Individual sabre	Tsel (KAZ); W 15–5	Touya (FRA); L 8–15	Did not advance				30
Akhnaten Spencer-El	Individual sabre	Zhao (CHN); L 10–15	Did not advance					34

Women

Athlete	Event	Round of 64	Round of 32	Round of 16	Quarterfinal	Semifinal	Final / BM	
Athlete	Event	Opposition Result	Opposition Result	Opposition Result	Opposition Result	Opposition Result	Opposition Result	Rank
Ann Marsh	Individual foil	El-Gammal (EGY); W 15–7	Yusheva (RUS); W 15–9	Lazăr-Szabo (ROU); L 7–15	Did not advance			16
Felicia Zimmermann	Individual foil	Bye	König (GER); L 8–15	Did not advance				20
Iris Zimmermann	Individual foil	Bye	Sharkova (RUS); W 15–13	Trillini (ITA); L 2–15	Did not advance			11
Arlene Stevens	Individual épée	Gamir (ALG); W 5–2	Mincza (HUN); L 8–11	Did not advance				32
Ann Marsh; Felicia Zimmermann; Iris Zimmermann	Team foil	—N/a		Bye	Hungary; W 45–41	Italy; L 38–45	Bronze medal final Germany; L 42–45	4

== Football ==
Summary

Team	Event	Group stage				Quarterfinal	Semifinal	Final / BM	
Team	Event	Opposition Score	Opposition Score	Opposition Score	Rank	Opposition Score	Opposition Score	Opposition Score	Rank
United States men	Men's tournament	Czech Republic; T 2–2	Cameroon; T 1–1	Kuwait; W 3–1	1 Q	Japan; W 2–2 (5–4)	Spain; L 1–3	Bronze medal game Chile; L 0–2	4
United States women	Women's tournament	Norway; W 2–0	China; T 1–1	Nigeria; W 3–1	1 Q	—N/a	Brazil; W 1–0	Norway; L 2–3	2nd place, silver medalist(s)

=== Men ===
Roster

Over aged players are marked with * (max 3).

Head coach: (England) Clive Charles

No.	Pos.	Player	Date of birth (age)	Caps	Club
1	GK	Brad Friedel*	18 May 1971 (aged 29)		(England) Liverpool
2	DF	Brian Dunseth	2 March 1977 (aged 23)		(United States) New England Revolution
3	DF	Chad McCarty	5 October 1977 (aged 22)		(United States) Tampa Bay Mutiny
4	DF	Jeff Agoos*	2 May 1968 (aged 32)		(United States) D.C. United
5	MF	John O'Brien	29 August 1977 (aged 23)		(Netherlands) Ajax
6	DF	Frankie Hejduk*	5 August 1974 (aged 26)		(Germany) Bayer Leverkusen
7	MF	Joey DiGiamarino	6 April 1977 (aged 23)		(United States) Colorado Rapids
8	DF	Danny Califf	17 March 1980 (aged 20)		(United States) LA Galaxy
9	MF	Ben Olsen	3 May 1977 (aged 23)		(United States) D.C. United
10	MF	Peter Vagenas	6 February 1978 (aged 22)		(United States) LA Galaxy
11	FW	Chris Albright	14 January 1979 (aged 21)		(United States) D.C. United
12	DF	Ramiro Corrales	12 March 1977 (aged 23)		(United States) MetroStars
13	FW	Landon Donovan	4 March 1982 (aged 18)		(Germany) Bayer Leverkusen
14	MF	Sasha Victorine	3 February 1978 (aged 22)		(United States) LA Galaxy
15	DF	Evan Whitfield	23 June 1977 (aged 23)		(United States) Chicago Fire
16	FW	Josh Wolff	25 February 1977 (aged 23)		(United States) Chicago Fire
17	FW	Conor Casey	25 July 1981 (aged 19)		(United States) University of Portland
18	GK	Tim Howard	6 March 1979 (aged 21)		(United States) MetroStars

- Stand-by players

No.	Pos.	Player	Date of birth (age)	Caps	Club
19	MF	Brian Winters	31 December 1977 (aged 22)		(United States) Minnesota Thunder
20	FW	Chris Brown	10 March 1977 (aged 23)		(United States) Kansas City Wizards
21	MF	DaMarcus Beasley	24 May 1982 (aged 18)		(United States) Chicago Fire
22	GK	Matt Napoleon	18 August 1977 (aged 23)		(United States) Columbus Crew

Group play

Team	Pld	W	D	L	GF	GA	GD	Pts
United States	3	1	2	0	6	4	+2	5
Cameroon	3	1	2	0	5	4	+1	5
Kuwait	3	1	0	2	6	8	−2	3
Czech Republic	3	0	2	1	5	6	−1	2

13 September 2000
20:00

United States	2–2	Czech Republic
Albright 21'; Wolff 44'	Report	Jankulovski 28'; Došek 52' (pen.)

Bruce Stadium, Canberra
Attendance: 24,800
Referee: Carlos Simon (Brazil)

16 September 2000
20:00

United States	1–1	Cameroon
Vagenas 64'	Report	M'Boma 16'

Bruce Stadium, Canberra
Attendance: 22,379
Referee: Mario Sánchez Yantén (Chile)

19 September 2000
20:00

United States	3–1	Kuwait
Califf 40'; Albright 63'; Donovan 88'	Report	Najem 83'

Melbourne Cricket Ground, Melbourne
Attendance: 19,684
Referee: Herbert Fandel (Germany)

Quarterfinal

23 September 2000
18:30

United States	2–2 (a.e.t.)	Japan
Wolff 68'; Vagenas 90' (pen.)	Report	Yanagisawa 30'; Takahara 72'
Penalties
Vagenas (penalty scored); Agoos (penalty scored); Donovan (penalty scored); Wolff (penalty scored); Victorine (penalty scored)	5–4	(penalty scored) Nakamura; (penalty scored) Inamoto; (penalty scored) Morioka; (penalty missed) Nakata; (penalty scored) Myojin

Hindmarsh Stadium, Adelaide
Attendance: 18,345
Referee: Felix Tangawarima (Zimbabwe)

Semifinal

26 September 2000
20:00

Spain	3–1	United States
Tamudo 16'; Angulo 25'; José Mari 87'	Report	Vagenas 42' (pen.)

Sydney Football Stadium, Sydney
Attendance: 39,800
Referee: Mourad Daami (Tunisia)

Bronze Medal match

29 September 2000
20:00

United States	0–2	Chile
	Report	Zamorano 69' (pen.), 84'

Sydney Football Stadium, Sydney
Attendance: 26,381
Referee: Simon Micallef (Australia)

=== Women ===
Roster Head coach: April Heinrichs

The United States named a squad of 18 players and 4 alternates for the tournament.

No.	Pos.	Player	Date of birth (age)	Caps	Goals	Club
1	GK	Briana Scurry	7 September 1971 (aged 29)			
2	MF	Lorrie Fair	5 August 1978 (aged 22)			
3	DF	Christie Pearce	24 June 1975 (aged 25)			
4	DF	Carla Overbeck	9 May 1968 (aged 32)			
5	MF	Nikki Serlenga	20 June 1978 (aged 22)			
6	DF	Brandi Chastain	21 July 1968 (aged 32)			
7	MF	Sara Whalen	28 April 1976 (aged 24)			
8	MF	Shannon MacMillan	7 October 1974 (aged 25)			
9	FW	Mia Hamm	17 March 1972 (aged 28)			
10	DF	Michelle French	27 January 1977 (aged 23)			
11	MF	Julie Foudy (captain)	23 January 1971 (aged 29)			
12	FW	Cindy Parlow	8 May 1978 (aged 22)			
13	MF	Kristine Lilly	22 July 1971 (aged 29)			
14	DF	Joy Fawcett	8 February 1968 (aged 32)			(United States Soccer Federation) Ajax
15	DF	Kate Sobrero	23 August 1976 (aged 24)			
16	FW	Tiffeny Milbrett	23 October 1972 (aged 27)			
17	DF	Danielle Slaton	10 June 1980 (aged 20)			
18	GK	Siri Mullinix	22 May 1978 (aged 22)			(United States Soccer Federation) Raleigh Wings

Unenrolled alternate players
No.	Pos.	Player	Date of birth (age)	Caps	Goals	Club
19	MF	Aly Wagner	10 August 1980 (aged 20)			
20	DF	Susan Bush	10 November 1980 (aged 19)			
21	FW	Christie Welsh	27 February 1981 (aged 19)			
22	GK	Jenni Branam	8 October 1980 (aged 19)			(United States Soccer Federation) Charlotte Eagles

Group play

Team	Pld	W	D	L	GF	GA	GD	Pts
United States	3	2	1	0	6	2	+4	7
Norway	3	2	0	1	5	4	+1	6
China	3	1	1	1	5	4	+1	4
Nigeria	3	0	0	3	3	9	−6	0

14 September 2000
17:30

United States	2–0	Norway
Milbrett 18'; Hamm 24'	Report

Melbourne Cricket Ground, Melbourne
Attendance: 16,043
Referee: Im Eun Ju (South Korea)

17 September 2000
17:30

United States	1–1	China
Foudy 38'	Report	Sun 67'

Melbourne Cricket Ground, Melbourne
Attendance: 32,500
Referee: Nicole Petignat (Switzerland)

20 September 2000
17:30

United States	3–1	Nigeria
Chastain 26'; Lilly 35'; MacMillan 56'	Report	Akide 48'

Melbourne Cricket Ground, Melbourne
Attendance: 9,000
Referee: Im Eun Ju (South Korea)

Semifinal

24 September 2000
17:30

United States	1–0	Brazil
Hamm 60'	Report

Bruce Stadium, Canberra
Attendance: 11,000
Referee: Nicole Petignat (Switzerland)

Gold Medal match

28 September 2000
20:00

Norway	3 – 2 (a.e.t./g.g.)	United States
Espeseth 44'; Gulbrandsen 78'; Mellgren 102'	Report	Milbrett 5', 90'

Sydney Football Stadium, Sydney
Attendance: 22,848
Referee: Sonia Denoncourt (Canada)

== Gymnastics ==
=== Artistic ===
Men
Team

Athlete	Event	Qualification								Final							
Athlete	Event	Apparatus						Total	Rank	Apparatus						Total	Rank
Athlete	Event	F	PH	R	V	PB	HB	Total	Rank	F	PH	R	V	PB	HB	Total	Rank
Morgan Hamm	Team	9.615 Q	9.400	9.425	9.350	9.475	—N/a			8.787	9.125	9.425	9.312	—N/a		—N/a	
Paul Hamm	Team	9.475	9.562	9.512	9.700	9.575	9.612	57.436	6 Q	9.600	9.600	9.525	9.725	9.762	8.462	—N/a	
Stephen McCain	Team	9.225	8.850	9.462	8.987	9.500	9.662	55.686	36	9.125	9.325	9.462	9.050	9.700	9.725	—N/a	
John Roethlisberger	Team	—N/a	9.600	9.625	—N/a		9.187	—N/a		—N/a	9.587	9.537	—N/a	9.425	9.737	—N/a	
Sean Townsend	Team	9.350	—N/a		9.650	9.625	9.712	—N/a		9.425	—N/a		9.200	9.787	9.700	—N/a	
Blaine Wilson	Team	9.025	9.462	9.612	9.800 Q	9.312	9.650	56.861	14 Q	9.450	9.587	9.587	9.700	9.775	9.050	—N/a	
Total	Team	37.662	38.024	38.211	38.500	38.175	38.636	229.208	4 Q	37.600	38.099	38.111	37.937	39.024	38.212	228.983	5

Individual finals

Athlete	Event	Apparatus						Total	Rank
Athlete	Event	F	PH	R	V	PB	HB	Total	Rank
Paul Hamm	All-around	9.675	9.612	9.550	9.587	9.750	8.875	57.049	14
Blaine Wilson	All-around	9.700	9.587	9.612	9.800	9.712	9.525	57.936	6
Morgan Hamm	Floor	9.262	—N/a					9.262	7
Blaine Wilson	Vault	—N/a			9.362	—N/a		9.362	6

Women
Team

Athlete	Event	Qualification						Final					
Athlete	Event	Apparatus				Total	Rank	Apparatus				Total	Rank
Athlete	Event	V	UB	BB	F	Total	Rank	V	UB	BB	F	Total	Rank
Amy Chow	Team	9.468	9.400	9.625	9.525	38.018	14 Q	9.350	9.750	9.112	9.625	—N/a	
Jamie Dantzscher	Team	9.325	—N/a		8.987	—N/a		9.424	9.700	—N/a	9.712	—N/a	
Dominique Dawes	Team	9.393	9.675	8.600	9.087	36.755	41	9.243	9.700	9.475	—N/a	—N/a	
Kristen Maloney	Team	9.225	9.575	9.312	9.525	37.637	20 Q	9.493	—N/a	9.537	9.737	—N/a	
Elise Ray	Team	9.468	9.687	9.687 Q	9.225	38.067	13 Q	9.418	9.725	9.337	9.337	—N/a	
Tasha Schwikert	Team	—N/a	9.625	9.237	—N/a			—N/a	9.675	9.350	9.600	—N/a	
Total	Team	37.654	38.652	37.861	37.362	151.439	6 Q	37.685	38.575	37.699	38.674	152.933	3rd place, bronze medalist(s)

Individual finals

Athlete	Event	Apparatus				Total	Rank
Athlete	Event	V	UB	BB	F	Total	Rank
Amy Chow	All-around	9.443	9.737	9.225	9.187	37.592	14
Kristen Maloney	All-around	9.543	9.587	8.887	9.412	37.429	19
Elise Ray	All-around	9.487	9.750	8.887	9.537	37.661	13
Elise Ray	Balance beam	—N/a		9.387	—N/a	9.387	8

=== Trampoline ===
Athlete	Event	Qualifying		Final	
Athlete	Event	Score	Rank	Score	Rank
Jennifer Parilla	Women's	60.70	9	Did not advance	

== Judo ==
Men

Athlete	Event	First round	Round of 32	Round of 16	Quarterfinal	Semifinal	Repechage 1	Repechage 2	Repechage 3	Repechage 4	Final / BM	
Athlete	Event	Opposition Result	Opposition Result	Opposition Result	Opposition Result	Opposition Result	Opposition Result	Opposition Result	Opposition Result	Opposition Result	Opposition Result	Rank
Brandan Greczkowski	–60 kg	Bye	Taymans (BEL); W 1000–0000	Nomura (JPN); L 0000–1001	Did not advance		Jia (CHN); W 1000–0001	Matuszek (SVK); W 1000–0000	Smagulov (KGZ); L 0001–0200	—N/a	Did not advance	
Alex Ottiano	–66 kg	Bye	Meridja (ALG); W	Uematsu (ESP); L 0000–0020	Did not advance					—N/a	Did not advance	
Jimmy Pedro	–73 kg	Bye	Choi (KOR); L 0001–0010	Did not advance			Sadykov (KGZ); W 1101–0001	Alquati (ARG); W 0202–0001	Nakamura (JPN); W 0200–0010	Almeida (POR); W 1000–0000	Bronze medal final Laryukov (BLR); L 0000–1000	5
Jason Morris	–81 kg	Bye	Kelly (AUS); L 0000–0001	Did not advance								
Brian Olson	–90 kg	—N/a	Spittka (GER); W 0010–0001	Huizinga (NED); L 0010–1001	Did not advance		Despaigne (CUB); W 1001–0000	Croitoru (ROU); W 1000–0001	Salimov (AZE); L	—N/a	Did not advance	
Ato Hand	–100 kg	Bye	Sergeev (KGZ); W 1000–0100	Birkfellner (AUT); W 1000–0000	Traineau (FRA); L 0000–1001	Did not advance	Bye	Stepkine (RUS); L 0000–0200	Did not advance	—N/a	Did not advance	
Martin Boonzaayer	+100 kg	Sánchez (CUB); L 0000–1000	Did not advance							—N/a	Did not advance	

Women

Athlete	Event	Round of 32	Round of 16	Quarterfinals	Semifinals	Repechage 1	Repechage 2	Repechage 3	Final / BM	
Athlete	Event	Opposition Result	Opposition Result	Opposition Result	Opposition Result	Opposition Result	Opposition Result	Opposition Result	Opposition Result	Rank
Lauren Meece	–48 kg	Lusnikova (UKR); L 0000–0001	Did not advance							
Hillary Wolf	–52 kg	Kye (PRK); L 0001–1120	Did not advance			Gravenstijn (NED); L 0011–0100	Did not advance			
Ellen Wilson	–57 kg	Bye	Fernández (ESP); L 0001–0013	Did not advance		Erdenet-Od (MGL); L 0001–1000	Did not advance			
Celita Schutz	–63 kg	Csizmadia (HUN); W 1000–0000	Teshima (JPN); W 0120–0102	Vandenhende (FRA); L 0000–1011	Did not advance	Bye	Jung (KOR); L 0011–0010	Did not advance		
Sandra Bacher	–70 kg	Bye	Arlove (AUS); W 1020–0010	Veranes (CUB); L 0000–0011	Did not advance	Bye	Wansart (GER); L 0000–0110	Did not advance		
Amy Tong	–78 kg	Bye	Luna (CUB); L 0000–0001	Did not advance		Ribble (CAN); W	Richter (ROU); L 0000–1000	Did not advance		
Colleen Rosensteel	+78 kg	Chalá (ECU); W	Maksymow (POL); W 0010–0001	Yamashita (JPN); L 0000–0202	Did not advance	Bye	Rodina (RUS); L 0000–1112	Did not advance		

== Modern pentathlon ==
Athlete	Event	Shooting			Fencing			Swimming			Riding			Running			Total	
Athlete	Event	Score	Rank	Points	W/L	Rank	Points	Time	Rank	Points	Penalties	Rank	Points	Time	Rank	Points	Points	Rank
Velizar Iliev	Men's	183	=4	1132	W13 L10	=5	880	2:07.33	11	1217	30	=1	1070	10:23.18	22	908	5207	9
Chad Senior	Men's	177	13	1060	W15 L8	=2	960	2:02.20	2	1278	210	18	890	9:43.45	14	1068	5256	6
Emily de Riel	Women's	185	1	1156	W11 L12	=9	800	2:21.88	7	1182	30	1	1070	10:54.56	3	1102	5310	2nd place, silver medalist(s)
Mary Beth Iagorashvili	Women's	169	=18	964	W15 L8	=1	960	2:19.51	3	1205	60	=2	1040	11:30.29	13	960	5129	4

== Rowing ==
Men

Athlete	Event	Heat		Repechage		Semifinal		Final	
Athlete	Event	Time	Rank	Time	Rank	Time	Rank	Time	Rank
Don Smith	Single sculls	7:10.34	3 R	7:11.83	1 S	7:10.69	6 FB	6:59.82	8
Sebastian Bea; Edward Murphy	Pair	6:44.86	3 S	Bye		6:35.42	3 FA	6:33.80	2nd place, silver medalist(s)
Mike Ferry; Henry Nuzum	Double sculls	6:37.81	3 R	6:34.56	2 S	6:28.49	4 FB	6:21.71	8
Conal Groom; Steve Tucker	Lightweight double sculls	6:42.08	4 R	6:39.72	2 S	6:32.86	5 FB	6:32.41	11
Jamie Koven; Eric Mueller; Wolf Moser; Michael Wherley	Four	6:07.36	2 S	Bye		6:05.80	3 FA	6:02.34	5
Tom Auth; Greg Ruckman; Marc Schneider; Paul Teti	Lightweight four	6:16.36	2 S	Bye		6:05.13	3 FA	6:10.09	6
Sean Hall; Ian McGowan; Nick Peterson; Jake Wetzel	Quadruple sculls	5:50.29	3 S	Bye		5:49.89	4 FB	5:49.76	7
Chris Ahrens; Peter Cipollone; Porter Collins; Robert Kaehler; Jeffrey Klepacki; Garrett Miller; David Simon; Bryan Volpenhein; Thomas Welsh	Eight	5:35.70	2 R	5:43.22	1 FA	—N/a		5:39.16	5

Women

Athlete	Event	Heats		Repechage		Semifinals		Final	
Athlete	Event	Time	Rank	Time	Rank	Time	Rank	Time	Rank
Monica Tranel-Michini	Single sculls	7:52.05	2 R	7:54.40	2 S	7:52.92	6 FB	7:48.95	12
Karen Kraft; Missy Schwen-Ryan	Pair	7:18.74	2 R	7:21.00	1 FA	—N/a		7:13.00	3rd place, bronze medalist(s)
Christine Collins; Sarah Garner	Lightweight double sculls	7:09.99	1 S	Bye		7:04.86	1 FA	7:06.37	3rd place, bronze medalist(s)
Ruth Davidon; Carol Skricki	Double sculls	7:15.48	3 R	7:08.99	2 FA	—N/a		7:02.61	4
Jennifer Dore; Hilary Gehman; Laurel Korholz; Kelly Salchow	Quadruple sculls	6:42.12	3 R	6:34.63	2 FA	—N/a		6:30.26	5
Torrey Folk; Amy Fuller; Sarah Jones; Katie Maloney; Amy Martin; Elizabeth McCagg; Linda Miller; Lianne Nelson; Rajanya Shah	Eight	6:17.37	3 R	6:17.36	1 FA	—N/a		6:16.87	6

Qualification Legend: FA=Final A (medal); FB=Final B (non-medal); S=Semifinals A/B; R=Repechage

== Sailing ==
Men

Athlete	Event	Race											Points	Rank
Athlete	Event	1	2	3	4	5	6	7	8	9	10	11	Points	Rank
Mike Gebhardt	Mistral	2	~~22~~	10	16	11	9	10	7	11	16	~~17~~	92	11
John Myrdal	Laser	4	20	~~39~~	21	~~44~~; ~~OCS~~	2	2	1	2	17	31	100	12
Russ Silvestri	Finn	3	~~18~~	6	11	2	16	~~18~~	4	3	16	3	64	6
Paul Foerster; Robert Merrick	470	8	9	4	11	1	1	6	~~12~~	~~13~~	1	1	42	2nd place, silver medalist(s)

Women

Athlete	Event	Race											Points	Rank
Athlete	Event	1	2	3	4	5	6	7	8	9	10	11	Points	Rank
Courtenay Becker-Dey	Europe	~~20~~	18	5	8	14	19	15	6	13	6	~~22~~	104	16
Lanee Butler	Mistral	~~30~~; ~~DSQ~~	4	~~12~~	6	5	6	7	4	10	3	12	57	4
Sarah Glaser; J. J. Isler	470	6	1	~~15~~	3	4	~~15~~	9	10	5	3	6	47	2nd place, silver medalist(s)

Open
Fleet racing

Athlete	Event	Race																Net points	Rank
Athlete	Event	1	2	3	4	5	6	7	8	9	10	11	12	13	14	15	16	Net points	Rank
Magnus Liljedahl; Mark Reynolds	Star	~~14~~	3	~~10~~	5	6	10	1	2	4	1	2	—N/a					34	1st place, gold medalist(s)
John C. Lovell; Charlie Ogletree	Tornado	8	6	5	8	2	10	~~11~~	11	3	~~17~~; ~~DSQ~~	4	—N/a					57	7
Charles McKee; Jonathan McKee	49er	6	3	5	1	5	~~14~~	~~13~~	1	3	3	1	11	7	6	11	1	64	3rd place, bronze medalist(s)

Mixed racing

Athlete	Event	Fleet racing								Match racing														
Athlete	Event	Race						Points	Rank	Round robin						Quarterfinal						Semifinal	Final / BM	
Athlete	Event	1	2	3	4	5	6	Points	Rank	Opposition Result	Opposition Result	Opposition Result	Opposition Result	Opposition Result	Rank	Opposition Result	Opposition Result	Opposition Result	Opposition Result	Opposition Result	Rank	Opposition Result	Opposition Result	Rank
Craig Healy; Hartwell Jordan; Jeff Madrigali	Soling	4	14	2	~~15~~	2	2	24	4 Q	DEN; L	GER; W	RUS; L	SWE; L	AUS; L	6	Did not advance								

== Shooting ==
Men

Athlete	Event	Qualification		Final		Total	
Athlete	Event	Points	Rank	Points	Rank	Points	Rank
Ken Johnson	10 m air rifle	583	=38	Did not advance			
Jason Parker	10 m air rifle	592	3 Q	101.1	5	693.1	5
Lance Dement	10 m running target	541	18	Did not advance			
Adam Saathoff	10 m running target	570	=12	Did not advance			
Glenn Dubis	50 m rifle prone	595	=10	Did not advance			
Thomas Tamas	50 m rifle prone	594	=13	Did not advance			
Michael Anti	50 m rifle three positions	1164	=9	Did not advance			
Glenn Dubis	50 m rifle three positions	1160	=18	Did not advance			
Bill Demarest	10 m air pistol	574	=23	Did not advance			
Michael Douglass	10 m air pistol	577	=15	Did not advance			
John McNally	25 m rapid fire pistol	578	=15	Did not advance			
Bill Demarest	50 m pistol	552	=23	Did not advance			
Daryl Szarenski	50 m pistol	550	25	Did not advance			
Lance Bade	Trap	112	=16	Did not advance			
Josh Lakatos	Trap	112	=16	Did not advance			
Lance Bade	Double trap	136	6 Q	43	=4	179	6
Walton Eller	Double trap	133	=12	Did not advance			
Bill Keever	Double trap	133	=12	Did not advance			
James Graves	Skeet	123	3 Q	24	=2	147	3rd place, bronze medalist(s)
Michael Schmidt Jr.	Skeet	117	=35	Did not advance			

Women

Athlete	Event	Qualification		Final		Total	
Athlete	Event	Points	Rank	Points	Rank	Points	Rank
Jayme Dickman	10 m air rifle	394	6 Q	101.4	4	495.4	6
Nancy Johnson	10 m air rifle	395	5 Q	102.7	2	497.7	1st place, gold medalist(s)
Jean Foster	50 m rifle three positions	571	=26	Did not advance			
Thrine Kane	50 m rifle three positions	562	35	Did not advance			
Melissa Mulloy	50 m rifle three positions	580	8 Q	93.7	5	673.7	8
Christina Cassidy	10 m air pistol	375	=28	Did not advance			
Rebecca Snyder	10 m air pistol	376	=25	Did not advance			
Janine Bowman	25 m pistol	574	24	Did not advance			
Rebecca Snyder	25 m pistol	580	=9	Did not advance			
Cindy Gentry	Trap	59	14	Did not advance			
Cindy Gentry	Double trap	100	5 Q	30	6	130	6
Kim Rhode	Double trap	103	3 Q	36	=2	139	3rd place, bronze medalist(s)
Kim Rhode	Skeet	69	7	Did not advance			
Cindy Shenberger	Skeet	70	3 Q	22	=4	92	5

== Softball ==
Summary

Team	Event	Preliminary round								Semifinal	Bronze medal game	Final	
Team	Event	Opposition Score	Opposition Score	Opposition Score	Opposition Score	Opposition Score	Opposition Score	Opposition Score	Rank	Opposition Score	Opposition Score	Opposition Score	Rank
United States women	Women's tournament	Canada; W 6–0	Cuba; W 3–0	Japan; L 1–2 (F/11)	China; W 2–0 (F/14)	Australia; L 1–2 (F/13)	New Zealand; W 2–0	Italy; W 6–0	4 Q	China; W 3–0 (F/10)	Australia; W 1–0	Japan; W 1–0 (F/8)	1st place, gold medalist(s)

Roster

USA Softball Olympic Team roster
Players		Coaches
Pitchers: 16 Lisa Fernandez; 21 Lori Harrigan; 4 Danielle Henderson; 32 Michele Mary Smith; 14 Christa Lee Williams	Catchers: 33 Stacey Nuveman; 23 Michelle Venturella; Infielders: 2 Jennifer Brundage; 22 Sheila Cornell-Douty; 3 Jennifer McFalls; 1 Dot Richardson; Outfielders: 24 Christie Ambrosi; 7 Laura Berg; 6 Crystl Bustos; 20 Leah O'Brien	Manager: Ralph Raymond; Coaches: Margo F. Jonker (asst.); Shirley Topley (asst.)

Preliminary round

Qualified for the final round

Team	W	L	PCT	Tiebreaker (Head–to–head record)
Japan	7	0	1.000	
Australia	6	1	.857	
China	5	2	.714	
United States	4	3	.571	
Italy	2	5	.286	1–0
New Zealand	2	5	.286	0–1
Cuba	1	6	.143	1–0
Canada	1	6	.143	0–1

September 17, 2000; 10:30	Canada	0 – 6	United States	(Australia) Blacktown Olympic Park; Attendance: 5,210

September 18, 2000; 13:00	Cuba	0 – 3	United States	(Australia) Blacktown Olympic Park; Attendance: 3,255

September 19, 2000; 10:30	Japan	2 – 1 (F/11)	United States	(Australia) Blacktown Olympic Park; Attendance: 3,893

September 20, 2000; 20:00	China	2 – 0 (F/14)	United States	(Australia) Blacktown Olympic Park; Attendance: 3,923

September 21, 2000; 13:00	United States	1 – 2 (F/13)	Australia	(Australia) Blacktown Olympic Park; Attendance: 9,209

September 22, 2000; 10:30	United States	2 – 0	New Zealand	(Australia) Blacktown Olympic Park; Attendance: 6,325

September 23, 2000; 20:00	United States	6 – 0	Italy	(Australia) Blacktown Olympic Park; Attendance: 7,384

Semifinals

September 25, 2000; 9:30	United States	3 – 0 (F/10)	China	(Australia) Blacktown Olympic Park; Attendance: 8,157

Bronze medal game

September 25, 2000; 19:30	Australia	0 – 1	United States	(Australia) Blacktown Olympic Park

Gold medal game

September 26, 2000; 19:30	United States	1 – 0 (F/8)	Japan	(Australia) Blacktown Olympic Park; Attendance: 8,923

== Swimming ==
Men

Athlete	Event	Heat		Semifinal		Final	
Athlete	Event	Time	Rank	Time	Rank	Time	Rank
Anthony Ervin	50 m freestyle	22.24	4 Q	22.13	3 Q	21.98	1st place, gold medalist(s)
Gary Hall Jr.	50 m freestyle	22.14	2 Q	22.07	1 Q	21.98	1st place, gold medalist(s)
Gary Hall Jr.	100 m freestyle	49.32	5 Q	49.13	6 Q	48.73	3rd place, bronze medalist(s)
Neil Walker	100 m freestyle	49.73	9 Q	49.04	5 Q	49.09	5
Josh Davis	200 m freestyle	1:48.43	4 Q	1:46.06	4 Q	1:46.73	4
Scott Goldblatt	200 m freestyle	1:49.05	8 Q	1:48.83	9	Did not advance	
Chad Carvin	400 m freestyle	3:48.42	5 Q	—N/a		3:47.58	6
Klete Keller	400 m freestyle	3:48.62	6 Q	—N/a		3:47.00	3rd place, bronze medalist(s)
Chris Thompson	1500 m freestyle	15:11.21	6 Q	—N/a		14:56.81	3rd place, bronze medalist(s)
Erik Vendt	1500 m freestyle	15:05.11	2 Q	—N/a		15:08.61	6
Lenny Krayzelburg	100 m backstroke	54.38	1 Q	54.32	1 Q	53.72 OR	1st place, gold medalist(s)
Neil Walker	100 m backstroke	55.34	6 Q	55.20	5 Q	55.14	6
Lenny Krayzelburg	200 m backstroke	1:58.40	1 Q	1:57.27	1 Q	1:56.76 OR	1st place, gold medalist(s)
Aaron Peirsol	200 m backstroke	1:59.10	2 Q	1:58.44	2 Q	1:57.35	2nd place, silver medalist(s)
Pat Calhoun	100 m breaststroke	1:03.03	25	Did not advance			
Ed Moses	100 m breaststroke	1:01.59	3 Q	1:01.22	3 Q	1:00.73	2nd place, silver medalist(s)
Kyle Salyards	200 m breaststroke	2:15.57	14 Q	2:13.38	3 Q	2:13.27	6
Tom Wilkens	200 m breaststroke	2:16.30	21	Did not advance			
Ian Crocker	100 m butterfly	53.45	9 Q	52.82	3 Q	52.44	4
Tommy Hannan	100 m butterfly	53.54	=11 Q	53.59	14	Did not advance	
Tom Malchow	200 m butterfly	1:56.25	1 Q	1:56.02	1 Q	1:55.35 OR	1st place, gold medalist(s)
Michael Phelps	200 m butterfly	1:57.30	3 Q	1:57.00	4 Q	1:56.50	5
Tom Dolan	200 m individual medley	2:01.55	2 Q	2:00.38	1 Q	1:59.77	2nd place, silver medalist(s)
Tom Wilkens	200 m individual medley	2:02.21	7 Q	2:01.51	6 Q	2:00.87	3rd place, bronze medalist(s)
Tom Dolan	400 m individual medley	4:15.52	2 Q	—N/a		4:11.76 WR	1st place, gold medalist(s)
Erik Vendt	400 m individual medley	4:17.15	5 Q	—N/a		4:14.23	2nd place, silver medalist(s)
Josh Davis^{[f]} Anthony Ervin; Gary Hall Jr. Jason Lezak; Scott Tucker^{[f]} Neil Walker	4 × 100 m freestyle relay	3:15.43	1 Q	—N/a		3:13.86	2nd place, silver medalist(s)
Chad Carvin^{[f]} Josh Davis; Nate Dusing^{[f]} Scott Goldblatt; Klete Keller; Jamie Rauch	4 × 200 m freestyle relay	7:17.22	2 Q	—N/a		7:12.64	2nd place, silver medalist(s)
Ian Crocker; Gary Hall Jr. Tommy Hannan^{[f]} Lenny Krayzelburg; Jason Lezak^{[f]} Ed Moses; Neil Walker^{[f]}	4 × 100 m medley relay	3:38.59	3 Q	—N/a		3:33.73 WR	1st place, gold medalist(s)

Women

Athlete	Event	Heat		Semifinal		Final	
Athlete	Event	Time	Rank	Time	Rank	Time	Rank
Dara Torres	50 m freestyle	24.96	2 Q	24.98	3 Q	24.63	3rd place, bronze medalist(s)
Amy Van Dyken	50 m freestyle	25.04	3 Q	25.00	4 Q	25.04	4
Jenny Thompson	100 m freestyle	55.22	3 Q	54.40	2 Q	54.43	3rd place, bronze medalist(s)
Dara Torres	100 m freestyle	55.12	2 Q	54.40	2 Q	54.43	3rd place, bronze medalist(s)
Lindsay Benko	200 m freestyle	2:00.13	4 Q	2:00.27	12	Did not advance	
Rada Owen	200 m freestyle	2:01.10	15 Q	2:03.34	16	Did not advance	
Brooke Bennett	400 m freestyle	4:07.57	1 Q	—N/a		4:05.80	1st place, gold medalist(s)
Diana Munz	400 m freestyle	4:10.39	4 Q	—N/a		4:07.07	2nd place, silver medalist(s)
Brooke Bennett	800 m freestyle	8:26.47	1 Q	—N/a		8:19.67 OR	1st place, gold medalist(s)
Kaitlin Sandeno	800 m freestyle	8:30.12	3 Q	—N/a		8:24.29	3rd place, bronze medalist(s)
Barbara Bedford	100 m backstroke	1:01.70	4 Q	1:01.61	=5 Q	1:01.47	6
Courtney Shealy	100 m backstroke	1:03.19	18	Did not advance			
Amanda Adkins	200 m backstroke	2:13.54	9 Q	2:12.97	7 Q	2:12.35	5
Lindsay Benko	200 m backstroke	2:12.72	6 Q	2:13.73	10	Did not advance	
Megan Quann	100 m breaststroke	1:07.48	1 Q	1:07.79	3 Q	1:07.05	1st place, gold medalist(s)
Staciana Stitts	100 m breaststroke	1:10.54	18	Did not advance			
Amanda Beard	200 m breaststroke	2:27.83	8 Q	2:26.62	8 Q	2:25.35	3rd place, bronze medalist(s)
Kristy Kowal	200 m breaststroke	2:26.73	2 Q	2:25.46	4 Q	2:24.56	2nd place, silver medalist(s)
Jenny Thompson	100 m butterfly	57.66	2 Q	58.18	3 Q	58.73	5
Dara Torres	100 m butterfly	58.76	5 Q	58.35	4 Q	58.20	3rd place, bronze medalist(s)
Misty Hyman	200 m butterfly	2:07.87	1 Q	2:07.96	4 Q	2:05.88 OR	1st place, gold medalist(s)
Kaitlin Sandeno	200 m butterfly	2:09.92	7 Q	2:09.40	6 Q	2:08.81	6
Gabrielle Rose	200 m individual medley	2:15.55	8 Q	2:14.40	7 Q	2:14.82	7
Cristina Teuscher	200 m individual medley	2:14.17	5 Q	2:13.47	3 Q	2:13.32	3rd place, bronze medalist(s)
Maddy Crippen	400 m individual medley	4:44.00	8 Q	—N/a		4:44.63	6
Kaitlin Sandeno	400 m individual medley	4:40.89	3 Q	—N/a		4:41.03	4
Erin Phenix^{[f]} Courtney Shealy; Ashley Tappin^{[f]} Jenny Thompson; Dara Torres; Amy Van Dyken	4 × 100 m freestyle relay	3:40.88	1 Q	—N/a		3:36.61 WR	1st place, gold medalist(s)
Samantha Arsenault; Lindsay Benko; Kim Black^{[f]} Diana Munz; Julia Stowers^{[f]} Jenny Thompson	4 × 200 m freestyle relay	8:01.69	1 Q	—N/a		7:57.80 OR	1st place, gold medalist(s)
Barbara Bedford; Megan Quann; Courtney Shealy^{[f]} Staciana Stitts^{[f]} Ashley Tappin^{[f]} Jenny Thompson; Dara Torres; Amy Van Dyken^{[f]}	4 × 100 m medley relay	4:06.16	1 Q	—N/a		3:58.30 WR	1st place, gold medalist(s)

^{f} - Athlete that swam in the heat but not the final.

== Synchronised swimming ==
Athlete	Event	Technical routine		Free routine (preliminary)				Free routine (final)		Total	
Athlete	Event	Points	Rank	Points	Rank	Total	Rank	Points	Rank	Points	Rank
Anna Kozlova; Tuesday Middaugh	Duet	33.810	4	62.920	4	96.730	4 Q	63.180	4	96.990	4
Carrie Barton; Tammy Cleland; Bridget Finn; Anna Kozlova; Kristina Lum; Elicia Marshall; Tuesday Middaugh; Heather Pease; Kim Wurzel	Team	33.530	5	—N/a				62.574	5	96.104	5

== Table Tennis ==
Men

Athlete	Event	Group stage			Round of 32	Round of 16	Quarterfinals	Semifinals	Final / BM	
Athlete	Event	Opposition Result	Opposition Result	Rank	Opposition Result	Opposition Result	Opposition Result	Opposition Result	Opposition Result	Rank
Cheng Yinghua	Singles	Iseki (JPN); L 1–3	Arado (CUB); W 3–0	2	Did not advance					
David Zhuang	Singles	Roßkopf (GER); L 0–3	Helmy (EGY); W 3–1	2	Did not advance					
Cheng Yinghua; Nguyen	Doubles	Maze / Tugwell (DEN); L 0–2	Matsushita / Shibutani (JPN); L 0–2	3	—N/a	Did not advance				
David Zhuang; Todd Sweeris	Doubles	Haakansson / Karlsson (SWE); L 1–2	Samsonov / Shchetinin (BLR); L 0–2	3	—N/a	Did not advance				

Women

Athlete	Event	Group stage			Round of 32	Round of 16	Quarterfinals	Semifinals	Final / BM	
Athlete	Event	Opposition Result	Opposition Result	Rank	Opposition Result	Opposition Result	Opposition Result	Opposition Result	Opposition Result	Rank
Tawny Banh	Singles	Lee (KOR); L 0–3	Wang (CAN); L 0–3	3	Did not advance					
Jasna Fazlić-Reed	Singles	Bátorfi (HUN); L 1–3	Kaffo (NGR); W 3–0	2	Did not advance					
Gao Jun	Singles	Zhou (AUS); W 3–0	Bakula (CRO); W 3–0	1 Q	Ryu (KOR); L 1–3	Did not advance				
Tawny Banh; Jasna Fazlić-Reed	Doubles	C. Li / K. Li (NZL); L 0–2	Schall / Struse (GER); L 1–2	3	—N/a	Did not advance				
Michelle Do; Gao Jun	Doubles	Gotsch / Schöpp (GER); L 1–2	Wang / Xu (CAN); W 2–1	2	—N/a	Did not advance				

== Taekwondo ==
Athlete	Event	Round of 16	Quarterfinals	Semifinals	Repechage Quarterfinals	Repechage Semifinals	Final / BM	
Athlete	Event	Opposition Result	Opposition Result	Opposition Result	Opposition Result	Opposition Result	Opposition Result	Rank
Juan Moreno	Men's −58 kg	Salim (HUN); L 0–2	did not advance					
Steven López	Men's −68 kg	Nolano (ITA); W 7–0	Massimino (AUS); W 1–1 SUP	Acharki (GER); W 2–0	Bye		Sin (KOR); W 1–0	1st place, gold medalist(s)
Kay Poe	Women's −49 kg	Poulsen (DEN); L 3–4	did not advance					
Barbara Kunkel	Women's −67 kg	Bye	Mueskens (NED); L 2–6	did not advance				

== Tennis ==
Men

Athlete	Event	Round of 64	Round of 32	Round of 16	Quarterfinals	Semifinals	Final / BM	
Athlete	Event	Opposition Result	Opposition Result	Opposition Result	Opposition Result	Opposition Result	Opposition Result	Rank
Michael Chang	Singles	Lareau (CAN); L 6–7^{(6–8)}, 3–6	Did not advance					=33
Todd Martin	Singles	Schüttler (GER); L 2–6, 0–6	Did not advance					=33
Vince Spadea	Singles	Rafter (AUS); L 4–6, 3–6	Did not advance					=33
Jeff Tarango	Singles	Camacho (BOL); W 6–0, 6–1	Zabaleta (ARG); L 2–6, 3–6	Did not advance				=17
Alex O'Brien; Jared Palmer	Doubles	—N/a	Bye	Knowles (BAH) / Merklein (BAH); L 2–6, 4–6	Did not advance			=9

Women

Athlete	Event	Round of 64	Round of 32	Round of 16	Quarterfinals	Semifinals	Final / BM	
Athlete	Event	Opposition Result	Opposition Result	Opposition Result	Opposition Result	Opposition Result	Opposition Result	Rank
Lindsay Davenport	Singles	Suárez (ARG); W 6–2, 6–2	de los Ríos (PAR); L (w/o)	Did not advance				=17
Monica Seles	Singles	Marosi (HUN); W 6–0, 6–1	Oremans (NED); W 6–1, 6–1	Dechy (FRA); W 6–2, 6–3	Van Roost (BEL); W 6–0, 6–2	V. Williams (USA); L 1–6, 6–4, 3–6	Bronze medal matcn Dokić (AUS); W 6–1, 6–4	3rd place, bronze medalist(s)
Venus Williams	Singles	Nagyová (SVK); W 6–2, 6–2	Tanasugarn (THA); W 6–2, 6–3	Kandarr (GER); W 6–2, 6–2	Sánchez Vicario (ESP); W 3–6, 6–2, 6–4	Seles (USA); W 6–1, 4–6, 6–3	Dementieva (RUS); W 6–2, 6–4	1st place, gold medalist(s)
Serena Williams; Venus Williams	Doubles	—N/a	Jeyaseelan / Webb (CAN); W 6–1, 6–3	Likhovtseva / Myskina (RUS); W 4–6, 6–2, 6–3	Halard-Decugis / Mauresmo (FRA); W 6–3, 6–2	Callens / Van Roost (BEL); W 6–4, 6–1	Boogert / Oremans (NED); W 6–1, 6–1	1st place, gold medalist(s)

== Triathlon ==
At the inaugural Olympic triathlon competition, the United States was represented by three men and three women. Two of the women placed in the top eight, with Joanna Zeiger missing a medal by about 17 seconds.

Athlete	Event	Swim	Trans. 1	Cycle	Trans. 2	Run	Total	Rank
Ryan Bolton	Men's	18:01	0:31	58:46	0:20	33:15	1:50:53	25
Hunter Kemper	Men's	17:49	0:22	58:57	0:18	33:15	1:50:06	17
Nick Radkewich	Men's	18:21	0:23	58:29	0:25	33:15	1:53:45	40
Jennifer Gutierrez	Women's	19:18	0:27	1:05:11	0:30	38:13	2:03:38	13
Sheila Taormina	Women's	18:36	0:26	1:05:59	0:25	37:19	2:02:46	6
Joanna Zeiger	Women's	19:16	0:30	1:05:15	0:23	36:02	2:01:26	4

== Volleyball ==
=== Beach ===
Athlete	Event	Preliminary round	Preliminary elimination		Round of 16	Quarterfinals	Semifinals	Final / BM	
Athlete	Event	Opposition Result	Opposition Result	Opposition Result	Opposition Result	Opposition Result	Opposition Result	Opposition Result	Rank
Dain Blanton; Eric Fonoimoana	Men's	Oetke – Scheuerpflug (GER); W 15–7 Q	Bye		Høidalen – Kjemperud (NOR); W 15–13	Heidger Jr. – Wong (USA); W 15–3	Brenha – Maia (POR); W 15 – 12	de Melo – Santos (BRA); W 12–11, 12–9	1st place, gold medalist(s)
Robert Heidger Jr. Kevin Wong	Men's	Holden – Leinemann (CAN); L 3–15	Jodard – Penigaud (FRA); W 15–2	Prosser – Zahner (AUS); L 11 –15 Q^{[g]}	Rodríguez – Sotelo Villalobos (MEX); W 3–15	Blanton – Fonoimoana (USA); L 3–15	Did not advance		=5
Annett Davis; Jenny Johnson Jordan	Women's	Huygens-Tholen – Straton (AUS); W 15–13 Q	Bye		Fernández – Larrea (CUB); W 15–9	Saiki – Takahashi (JPN); L 9–15	Did not advance		=5
Misty May; Holly McPeak	Women's	Hudcová – Tobiasová (CZE); W 15–5 Q	Bye		Gattelli – Perrotta (ITA); W 15–13	Pires – Samuel (BRA); L 14–16	Did not advance		=5

^{g} – Heidger & Wong advanced from the elimination pool by having the highest point differential among losers

=== Indoor ===
Summary

Team	Event	Group stage						Quarterfinal	Semifinal	Final / BM	
Team	Event	Opposition Score	Opposition Score	Opposition Score	Opposition Score	Opposition Score	Rank	Opposition Score	Opposition Score	Opposition Score	Rank
United States men	Men's tournament	Argentina; L 1–3	Russia; L 1–3	FR Yugoslavia; L 0–3	South Korea; L 2–3	Italy; L 1–3	6	Did not advance			
United States women	Women's tournament	China; W 3–1	Kenya; W 3–0	Australia; W 3–0	Croatia; W 3–0	Brazil; L 1–3	2 Q	South Korea; W 3–2	Russia; L 3–2	Bronze medal match Brazil; L 0–3	4

==== Men ====
Roster

#NR	NAME	BIRTHDATE
#1	Lloy Ball	1972-02-17
#14	Kevin Barnett	1974-05-14
#12	Tom Hoff	1973-06-09
#7	John Hyden	1972-10-07
#3	Mike Lambert	1974-04-14
#16	Daniel Landry	1970-01-15
#10	Chip McCaw	1973-03-24
#9	Ryan Millar	1978-01-22
#13	Jeff Nygaard	1972-08-03
#15	George Roumain	1976-03-28
#5	Erik Sullivan	1972-08-09
#17	Andy Witt	1978-03-21
Coach	Doug Beal	1947-03-04

Group play

Pos	Team	Pld	W	L	Pts	SW	SL	SR	SPW	SPL	SPR	Qualification
1	Italy	5	5	0	10	15	4	3.750	482	421	1.145	Quarterfinals
2	Russia	5	4	1	9	13	7	1.857	465	443	1.050	Quarterfinals
3	FR Yugoslavia	5	3	2	8	12	9	1.333	489	461	1.061	Quarterfinals
4	Argentina	5	2	3	7	7	11	0.636	409	446	0.917	Quarterfinals
5	South Korea	5	1	4	6	8	14	0.571	491	504	0.974	
6	United States	5	0	5	5	5	15	0.333	417	478	0.872	

17 September 2000; 18:30	United States	1–3	Argentina	Sydney Entertainment Centre; Attendance: 8,519; Referees: Stoyan Stoyanov (Bulgaria), Wang Ching (China)
17 September 2000; 18:30	(26–24, 23–25, 21–25, 18–25)			Sydney Entertainment Centre; Attendance: 8,519; Referees: Stoyan Stoyanov (Bulgaria), Wang Ching (China)

19 September 2000; 14:30	Russia	3–1	United States	Sydney Entertainment Centre; Attendance: 7,223; Referees: Dean Turner (Australia), Fernando Nava (Mexico)
19 September 2000; 14:30	(25–18, 25–23, 21–25, 25–17)			Sydney Entertainment Centre; Attendance: 7,223; Referees: Dean Turner (Australia), Fernando Nava (Mexico)

21 September 2000; 12:30	United States	0–3	FR Yugoslavia	Sydney Showground Pavilion 4 Attendance: 4,348; Referees: Josebel Palmeirim (Brazil), Wang Ning (China)
21 September 2000; 12:30	(15–25, 20–25, 23–25)			Sydney Showground Pavilion 4 Attendance: 4,348; Referees: Josebel Palmeirim (Brazil), Wang Ning (China)

23 September 2000; 18:30	South Korea	3–2	United States	Sydney Entertainment Centre; Attendance: 8,095; Referees: Bela Hobor (Hungary), Themistoklis Kalpaktsoglou (Greece)
23 September 2000; 18:30	(25–20, 25–27, 26–24, 21–25, 15–13)			Sydney Entertainment Centre; Attendance: 8,095; Referees: Bela Hobor (Hungary), Themistoklis Kalpaktsoglou (Greece)

25 September 2000; 20:30	Italy	3–1	United States	Sydney Entertainment Centre; Attendance: 7,960; Referees: Dean Turner (Australia), Wang Ning (China)
25 September 2000; 20:30	(21–25, 25–18, 25–18, 25–18)			Sydney Entertainment Centre; Attendance: 7,960; Referees: Dean Turner (Australia), Wang Ning (China)

==== Women ====
Roster

- Head Coach: Mick Haley

#	Name	Date of birth	Height	Weight	Spike	Block
1	Demetria Sance	19.08.1977	180	80
2	Danielle Scott	01.10.1972	188	83
5	Stacy Sykora (L)	24.06.1977	175	61
7	Heather Bown	29.11.1978	188	90
8	Charlene Tagaloa	30.08.1973	176	71
9	Kerri Walsh	15.08.1978	189	73
10	Mickisha Hurley	06.03.1975	183	66	317	305
11	Robin Ah Mow (c)	15.09.1975	172	66	291	281
13	Tara Cross-Battle	16.09.1968	180	76
15	Logan Tom	25.05.1981	184	80
16	Sarah Noriega	24.04.1976	189	70	323	307
18	Allison Weston	19.02.1974	183	77	309	295

Group play

Pos	Team	Pld	W	L	Pts	SW	SL	SR	SPW	SPL	SPR	Qualification
1	Brazil	5	5	0	10	15	1	15.000	395	272	1.452	Quarterfinals
2	United States	5	4	1	9	13	4	3.250	392	306	1.281	Quarterfinals
3	Croatia	5	3	2	8	9	9	1.000	411	389	1.057	Quarterfinals
4	China	5	2	3	7	8	9	0.889	371	365	1.016	Quarterfinals
5	Australia	5	1	4	6	4	13	0.308	303	408	0.743	
6	Kenya	5	0	5	5	2	15	0.133	280	412	0.680	

16 September 2000; 21:10	China	1–3	United States	Sydney Entertainment Centre; Attendance: 8,250; Referees: Klaus Fezer (Germany), Bela Hobor (Hungary)
16 September 2000; 21:10	(25–19, 21–25, 12–25 ,24–26); Report			Sydney Entertainment Centre; Attendance: 8,250; Referees: Klaus Fezer (Germany), Bela Hobor (Hungary)

18 September 2000; 14:30	United States	3–0	Kenya	Sydney Entertainment Centre; Attendance: 4,848; Referees: Ivan Golianski (Russia), Themistoklis Kalpaktsoglou (Greece)
18 September 2000; 14:30	(25–16, 25–6, 25–16); Report			Sydney Entertainment Centre; Attendance: 4,848; Referees: Ivan Golianski (Russia), Themistoklis Kalpaktsoglou (Greece)

20 September 2000; 20:30	Croatia	0–3	United States	Sydney Entertainment Centre; Attendance: 8,457; Referees: Kim Kun-Tae (South Korea), Songsak Chareonpong (Thailand)
20 September 2000; 20:30	(19–25, 18–25, 16–25); Report			Sydney Entertainment Centre; Attendance: 8,457; Referees: Kim Kun-Tae (South Korea), Songsak Chareonpong (Thailand)

22 September 2000; 20:30	United States	3–0	Australia	Sydney Entertainment Centre; Attendance: 8,219; Referees: Jarmo Salonen (Finland), Ivan Golianski (Russia)
22 September 2000; 20:30	(25–11, 25–17, 25–10); Report			Sydney Entertainment Centre; Attendance: 8,219; Referees: Jarmo Salonen (Finland), Ivan Golianski (Russia)

24 September 2000; 12:00	Brazil	3–1	United States	Sydney Showground Pavilion 4 Attendance: 4,686; Referees: Takashi Shimoyama (Japan), Bela Hobor (Hungary)
24 September 2000; 12:00	(25–17, 20–25, 25–15, 25–15); Report			Sydney Showground Pavilion 4 Attendance: 4,686; Referees: Takashi Shimoyama (Japan), Bela Hobor (Hungary)

Quarterfinal

26 September 2000; 20:30	United States	3–2	South Korea	Sydney Entertainment Centre; Attendance: 7,496; Referees: Jarmo Salonen (Finland), Paolo Porcari (Italy)
26 September 2000; 20:30	(26–24, 17–25, 25–23, 25–27, 16–14); Report			Sydney Entertainment Centre; Attendance: 7,496; Referees: Jarmo Salonen (Finland), Paolo Porcari (Italy)

Semifinal

28 September 2000; 20:55	United States	2–3	Russia	Sydney Entertainment Centre; Attendance: 9,031; Referees: Juan Pereyra (Argentina), Songsak Chareonpong (Thailand)
28 September 2000; 20:55	(15–25, 25–23, 15–25, 28–26, 8–15); Report			Sydney Entertainment Centre; Attendance: 9,031; Referees: Juan Pereyra (Argentina), Songsak Chareonpong (Thailand)

Bronze Medal match

30 September 2000; 12:30	(bronze) Brazil	3–0	United States	Sydney Entertainment Centre; Attendance: 9,044; Referees: Stoyan Stoyanov (Bulgaria), Bela Hobor (Hungary)
30 September 2000; 12:30	(25–18, 25–22, 25–21); Report			Sydney Entertainment Centre; Attendance: 9,044; Referees: Stoyan Stoyanov (Bulgaria), Bela Hobor (Hungary)

== Water polo ==
Summary

Team	Event	Group stage						Quarterfinal	Semifinal / Pl.	Final / BM / Pl.	
Team	Event	Opposition Score	Opposition Score	Opposition Score	Opposition Score	Opposition Score	Rank	Opposition Score	Opposition Score	Opposition Score	Rank
United States men	Men's tournament	Croatia; L 7–10	FR Yugoslavia; L 5–8	Netherlands; W 12–8	Hungary; L 9–10	Greece; W 9–3	4 Q	Russia; L 10–11	5th-8th semifinal Croatia; W 9–8	5th place match Italy; L 8–10	6
United States women	Women's tournament	Netherlands; W 6–4	Canada; T 8–8	Russia; W 7–5	Australia; L 6–7	Kazakhstan; W 9–6	2 Q	—N/a	Netherlands; W 6–5	Australia; L 3–4	2nd place, silver medalist(s)

=== Men ===
Roster
Head Coach: John Vargas

No.	Name	Date of birth
1	Dan Hackett	September 11, 1970
2	Chi Kredell	February 16, 1971
3	Robert Lynn	February 7, 1967
4	Kyle Kopp	November 10, 1966
5	Chris Oeding	September 10, 1971
6	Gavin Arroyo	May 10, 1972
7	Brad Schumacher	March 6, 1974
8	Tony Azevedo	November 21, 1981
9	Wolf Wigo	May 8, 1973
10	Chris Humbert	December 27, 1969
11	Sean Kern	July 11, 1978
12	Sean Nolan	July 18, 1972
13	Ryan Bailey	August 28, 1975

Group play

Pos	Team	Pld	W	D	L	GF	GA	GD	Pts	Qualification
1	FR Yugoslavia	5	4	1	0	41	22	+19	9	Quarter Finals
2	Croatia	5	4	1	0	42	30	+12	9	Quarter Finals
3	Hungary	5	3	0	2	49	39	+10	6	Quarter Finals
4	United States	5	2	0	3	42	39	+3	4	Quarter Finals
5	Netherlands	5	1	0	4	34	55	−21	2	
6	Greece	5	0	0	5	22	45	−23	0	

Source: LA84
Rules for classification: 1) Points; 2) Head-to-head points; 3) Head-to-head goal difference; 4) Head-to-head goals scored; 5) Goal difference.

23 September 2000; 16:15	Croatia	10–7	United States	Ryde Aquatic Leisure Centre; Referees: Kerr (AUS), Galkine (RUS)
23 September 2000; 16:15	Score by quarters: 3-1, 4-1, 1-2, 2-3			Ryde Aquatic Leisure Centre; Referees: Kerr (AUS), Galkine (RUS)

24 September 2000; 14:30	United States	5–8	FR Yugoslavia	Ryde Aquatic Leisure Centre; Referees: Moliner Molins (ESP), Schwartz (ISR)
24 September 2000; 14:30	Score by quarters: 1-3, 2-2, 1-2, 1-1			Ryde Aquatic Leisure Centre; Referees: Moliner Molins (ESP), Schwartz (ISR)

25 September 2000; 9:30	Netherlands	8–12	United States	Ryde Aquatic Leisure Centre; Referees: Afanasiev (RUS), Menendez Betancourt (CUB)
25 September 2000; 9:30	Score by quarters: 2-4, 3-3, 1-3, 2-2			Ryde Aquatic Leisure Centre; Referees: Afanasiev (RUS), Menendez Betancourt (CUB)

26 September 2000; 09:30	Hungary	10–9	United States	Ryde Aquatic Leisure Centre; Referees: Tulga (TUR), Galkine (RUS)
26 September 2000; 09:30	Score by quarters: 3-1, 2-3, 3-4, 2-1			Ryde Aquatic Leisure Centre; Referees: Tulga (TUR), Galkine (RUS)

27 September 2000; 19:15	Greece	3–9	United States	Ryde Aquatic Leisure Centre; Referees: Clemencon (FRA), Tulga (TUR)
27 September 2000; 19:15	Score by quarters: 0-2, 0-3, 0-2, 3-2			Ryde Aquatic Leisure Centre; Referees: Clemencon (FRA), Tulga (TUR)

Quarterfinal

29 September 2000; 14:30	Russia	11–10	United States	Ryde Aquatic Leisure Centre; Referees: Bookelman (NED), Margeta (SLO)
29 September 2000; 14:30	Score by quarters: 3-0, 2-4, 4-3, 2-3			Ryde Aquatic Leisure Centre; Referees: Bookelman (NED), Margeta (SLO)

5th to 8th place classification

30 September 2000; 19:00	United States	9–8	Croatia	Ryde Aquatic Leisure Centre; Referees: Moliner Molins (ESP), Clemencon (FRA)
30 September 2000; 19:00	Score by quarters: 1-0, 2-2, 2-2, 2-3,1-1,1-0			Ryde Aquatic Leisure Centre; Referees: Moliner Molins (ESP), Clemencon (FRA)

5th place match

1 October 2000; 12:45	United States	8–10	Italy	Ryde Aquatic Leisure Centre; Referees: Rajevic (YUG), Ludecke (GER)
1 October 2000; 12:45	Score by quarters: 2-4, 1-3, 3-1, 2-2			Ryde Aquatic Leisure Centre; Referees: Rajevic (YUG), Ludecke (GER)

=== Women ===
Roster
Head Coach:

No.	Name	Date of birth
1	Bernice Orwig	November 24, 1976
2	Heather Petri	June 13, 1978
3	Ericka Lorenz	February 18, 1981
4	Brenda Villa	April 18, 1980
5	Ellen Estes	October 13, 1978
6	Coralie Simmons	March 1, 1977
7	Maureen O'Toole	March 4, 1961
8	Julie Swail	December 27, 1972
9	Heather Moody	August 21, 1973
10	Robin Beauregard	February 23, 1979
11	Nicolle Payne	July 15, 1976
12	Kathy Sheehy	April 26, 1970
13	Courtney Johnson	May 7, 1974

Group play

Pos	Team	Pld	W	D	L	GF	GA	GD	Pts	Qualification
1	Australia (H)	5	4	0	1	35	20	+15	8	Semi Finals
2	United States	5	3	1	1	36	30	+6	7	Semi Finals
3	Netherlands	5	3	0	2	27	26	+1	6	Semi Finals
4	Russia	5	2	1	2	36	29	+7	5	Semi Finals
5	Canada	5	1	2	2	33	34	−1	4	
6	Kazakhstan	5	0	0	5	23	51	−28	0	

Source: LA84
Rules for classification: 1) Points; 2) Head-to-head points; 3) Head-to-head goal difference; 4) Head-to-head goals scored; 5) Goal difference.
(H) Hosts

16 September 2000; 19:15	Report	Netherlands	4–6	United States	Ryde Aquatic Centre; Referees: Angel Moliner Molins (ESP), Gyorgy Csaszar (HUN)
16 September 2000; 19:15	Report	Score by quarters: 0-2, 1-1, 2-1, 1-2			Ryde Aquatic Centre; Referees: Angel Moliner Molins (ESP), Gyorgy Csaszar (HUN)
16 September 2000; 19:15	Report	de Bruijn 2	Goals	Lorenz 2	Ryde Aquatic Centre; Referees: Angel Moliner Molins (ESP), Gyorgy Csaszar (HUN)

17 September 2000; 18:00	Report	United States	8–8	Canada	Ryde Aquatic Centre; Referees: Boris Margeta (SLO), Vlastimil Kratochvil (SVK)
17 September 2000; 18:00	Report	Score by quarters: 3-3, 2-3, 0-2, 3-0			Ryde Aquatic Centre; Referees: Boris Margeta (SLO), Vlastimil Kratochvil (SVK)
17 September 2000; 18:00	Report	Beauregard 3	Goals	Horn-Miller 3	Ryde Aquatic Centre; Referees: Boris Margeta (SLO), Vlastimil Kratochvil (SVK)

18 September 2000; 18:00	Report	Russia	5–7	United States	Ryde Aquatic Centre; Referees: Renato Dani (ITA), Patrick Clemencon (FRA)
18 September 2000; 18:00	Report	Score by quarters: 1-1, 2-2, 1-3, 1-1			Ryde Aquatic Centre; Referees: Renato Dani (ITA), Patrick Clemencon (FRA)
18 September 2000; 18:00	Report	five players 1	Goals	Simmons 3	Ryde Aquatic Centre; Referees: Renato Dani (ITA), Patrick Clemencon (FRA)

19 September 2000; 13:00	Report	United States	6–7	Australia	Ryde Aquatic Centre; Referees: Paraskevas Chasekioglou (GRE), Boris Margeta (SLO)
19 September 2000; 13:00	Report	Score by quarters: 2-2, 1-0, 2-4, 1-1			Ryde Aquatic Centre; Referees: Paraskevas Chasekioglou (GRE), Boris Margeta (SLO)
19 September 2000; 13:00	Report	two players 2	Goals	Gusteron 2	Ryde Aquatic Centre; Referees: Paraskevas Chasekioglou (GRE), Boris Margeta (SLO)

20 September 2000; 19:15	Report	Kazakhstan	6–9	United States	Ryde Aquatic Centre; Referees: Zeljko Klaric (CRO), Vahid Moradi (IRI)
20 September 2000; 19:15	Report	Score by quarters: 1-2, 1-3, 2-3, 2-1			Ryde Aquatic Centre; Referees: Zeljko Klaric (CRO), Vahid Moradi (IRI)
20 September 2000; 19:15	Report	two players 2	Goals	Villa 4	Ryde Aquatic Centre; Referees: Zeljko Klaric (CRO), Vahid Moradi (IRI)

Semifinal

22 September 2000; 19:15	Report	United States	6–5	Netherlands	Ryde Aquatic Centre; Referees: Renato Dani (ITA), Patrick Clemencon (FRA)
22 September 2000; 19:15	Report	Score by quarters: 3-2, 1-3, 1-0, 1-0			Ryde Aquatic Centre; Referees: Renato Dani (ITA), Patrick Clemencon (FRA)
22 September 2000; 19:15	Report	two players 2	Goals	two players 2	Ryde Aquatic Centre; Referees: Renato Dani (ITA), Patrick Clemencon (FRA)

Gold Medal Match

23 September 2000; 21:15	Report	Australia	4–3	United States	Sydney Olympic Aquatic Centre; Referees: Renato Dani (ITA), Vladimir Prikhodko (KAZ)
23 September 2000; 21:15	Report	Score by quarters: 1-1, 0-1, 1-0, 2-1			Sydney Olympic Aquatic Centre; Referees: Renato Dani (ITA), Vladimir Prikhodko (KAZ)
23 September 2000; 21:15	Report	four players 1	Goals	Villa 2	Sydney Olympic Aquatic Centre; Referees: Renato Dani (ITA), Vladimir Prikhodko (KAZ)

== Weightlifting ==
Athlete	Event	Snatch		Clean & Jerk		Total	
Athlete	Event	Weight	Rank	Weight	Rank	Weight	Rank
Oscar Chaplin III	Men's –77 kg	155.0	11	180.0	=11	335.0	12
Shane Hamman	Men's +105 kg	195.0	=7	225.0	9	420.0	10
Robin Goad	Women's –48 kg	77.5	4	100.0	=3	177.5	5
Tara Nott	Women's –48 kg	82.5	=1	102.5	2	185.0	1st place, gold medalist(s)
Cara Heads	Women's –75 kg	102.5	=7	120.0	7	222.5	7
Cheryl Haworth	Women's +75 kg	125.0	3	145.0	=3	270.0	3rd place, bronze medalist(s)

== Wrestling ==
Key:

- TO – Victory by Fall.
- SP – Decision by technical superiority (10 points difference) – the loser with technical points
- ST – Decision by technical superiority (10 points difference) – the loser without technical points
- PP – Decision by Points – the loser with technical points.
- PO – Decision by Points – the loser without technical points.
- VA – Victory by injury.

Athlete	Event	Elimination pool				Quarterfinals	Semifinals	Final / BM	
Athlete	Event	Opposition Result	Opposition Result	Opposition Result	Rank	Opposition Result	Opposition Result	Opposition Result	Rank
Sammie Henson	Freestyle 54 kg	Moon (KOR); W 4–0^{ST}	Tanabe (JPN); W 3–1^{PP}	—N/a	1 Q	Zakharuk (UKR); W 3–1^{PP}	Kontoev (BLR); W 3–0^{PO}	Abdullayev (AZE); L 1–3^{PP}	2nd place, silver medalist(s)
Terry Brands	Freestyle 58 kg	Ibragimov (KAZ); W 4–0^{TO}	Polychronidis (GRE); W 3–1^{PP}	—N/a	1 Q	Pogosian (GEO); W 3–1^{PP}	Dabir (IRI); L 1–3^{PP}	Bronze medal bout Zakhartdinov (UZB); W 3–1^{PP}	3rd place, bronze medalist(s)
Cary Kolat	Freestyle 63 kg	Talaei (IRI); L 1–3^{PP}	Islamov (UZB); W 4–0^{TO}	—N/a	2	Did not advance			9
Lincoln McIlravy	Freestyle 69 kg	Oziti (NGR); W 4–0^{PA}	Şanlı (TUR); W 3–1^{PP}	—N/a	1 Q	Diaconu (MDA); W 3–1^{PP}	Igali (CAN); L 1–3^{PP}	Bronze medal bout Demchenko (BLR); W 3–1^{PP}	3rd place, bronze medalist(s)
Brandon Slay	Freestyle 76 kg	Paskalev (BUL); W 3–1^{PP}	Saitiev (RUS); W 3–1^{PP}	—N/a	1 Q	Laliyev (KAZ); W 3–1^{PP}	Bereket (TUR); W 3–1^{PP}	Leipold (GER); L 0–3^{PO}	(gold)
Charles Burton	Freestyle 85 kg	Diouf (SEN); W 3–0^{PO}	Martinetti (SUI); W 4–0^{ST}	—N/a	1 Q	Ibragimov (MKD); L 1–3^{PP}	Did not advance	5th place bout Yang (KOR); W 4–0^{PA}	5
Melvin Douglas	Freestyle 97 kg	Murtazaliev (RUS); L 1–3^{PP}	Tasoyev (UKR); L 1–3^{PP}	—N/a	3	Did not advance			18
Kerry McCoy	Freestyle 130 kg	Valiyev (UKR); W 3–0^{PO}	Ashabaliyev (AZE); W 4–0^{ST}	—N/a	1 Q	Taymazov (UZB); L 1–3^{PP}	Did not advance	5th place bout Medvedev (BLR); W 4–0^{PA}	5
Steven Mays	Greco-Roman 54 kg	Elela (EGY); L 1–3^{PP}	Kalilov (KGZ); L 0–4^{ST}	Kalashnykov (UKR); L 0–4^{ST}	4	Did not advance			17
Jim Gruenwald	Greco-Roman 58 kg	Petrenko (BLR); W 3–0^{PO}	Mnatsakanyan (ARM); W 3–1^{PP}	—N/a	1 Q	Sheng (CHN); L 1–4^{SP}	Did not advance	5th place bout Ashkani (IRI); L 1–3^{PP}	6
Kevin Bracken	Greco-Roman 63 kg	Choi (KOR); W 3–1^{PP}	Magni (ITA); L 1–3^{PP}	—N/a	1 Q	Samourgachev (RUS); L 1–3^{PP}	Did not advance	5th place bout Kurbanov (UZB); L 0–4^{ST}	6
Heath Sims	Greco-Roman 69 kg	Biktyakov (UZB); L 0–3^{PO}	Nagata (JPN); W 3–1^{PP}	—N/a	3	Did not advance			12
Matt Lindland	Greco-Roman 76 kg	Melelashvili (GEO); W 3–0^{PO}	Erofaylov (UZB); W 3–1^{PP}	Slila (ALG); W 4–0^{PA}	1 Q	Bye	Manukyan (UKR); W 3–1^{PP}	Kardanov (RUS); L 0–3^{PO}	2nd place, silver medalist(s)
Quincey Clark	Greco-Roman 85 kg	Méndez (CUB); L 0–3^{PO}	Abdelfatah (EGY); L 0–4^{ST}	—N/a	3	Did not advance			19
Garrett Lowney	Greco-Roman 97 kg	Koguashvili (RUS); W 3–1^{PP}	Švec (CZE); W 3–0^{PO}	—N/a	1 Q	Chkhaidze (GEO); W 3–1^{PO}	Ljungberg (SWE); L 1–3^{PP}	Bronze medal bout Thanos (GRE); W 3–1^{PP}	3rd place, bronze medalist(s)
Rulon Gardner	Greco-Roman 130 kg	Giunta (ITA); W 3–1^{PP}	Galstyan (ARM); W 3–0^{PO}	Ayari (TUN); W 3–1^{PP}	1 Q	Bye	Evseitchik (ISR); W 3–1^{PP}	Karelin (RUS); W 3–0^{PO}	1st place, gold medalist(s)

== See also ==
- United States at the 1999 Pan American Games
