= Virginie Dedieu =

French synchronized swimmer

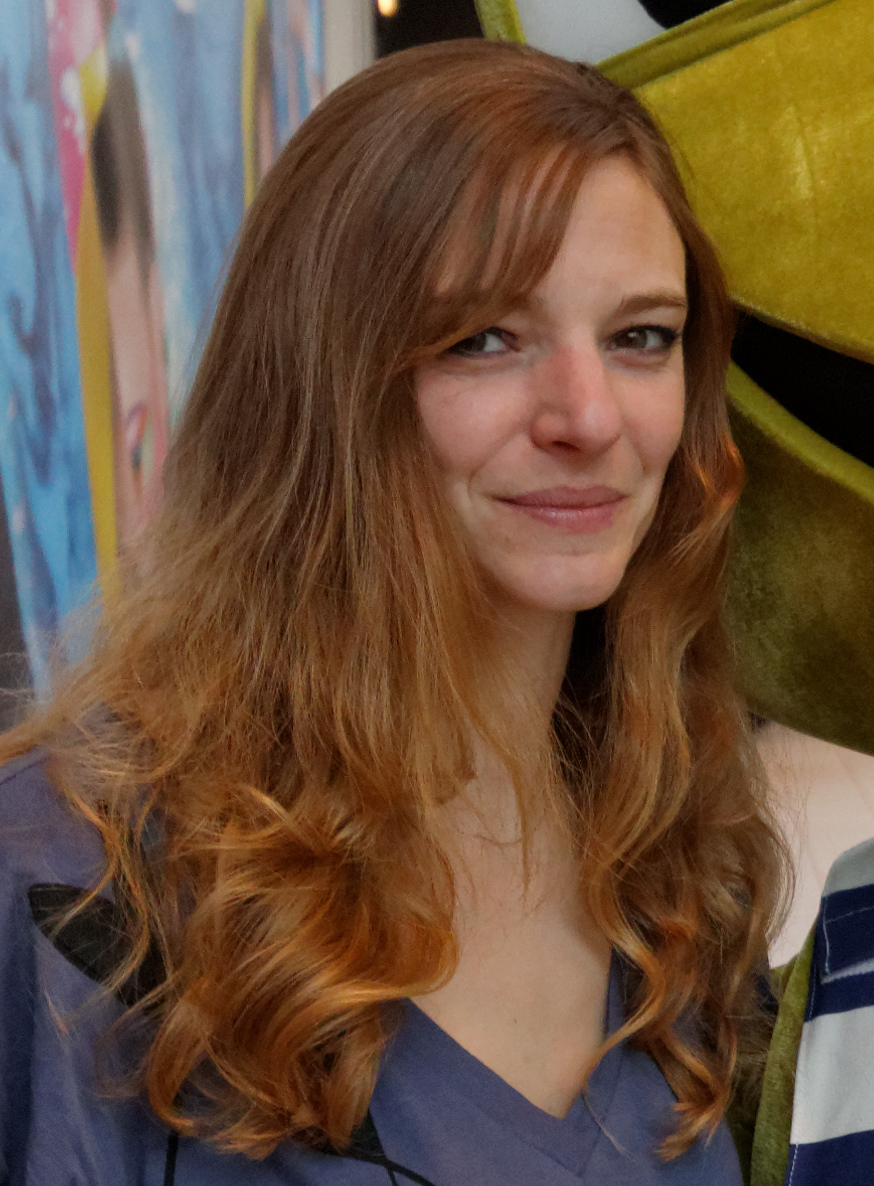
- Dedieu at the 2013 French Open

Personal information
- Nationality: France
- Born: 25 February 1979 (age 47) Aix-en-Provence, France
- Height: 164 cm (5 ft 5 in)
- Weight: 52 kg (115 lb)

Sport
- Sport: Swimming
- Strokes: Synchronized swimming
- Club: Aix Natation
Medal record
Synchronized swimming
Representing France
Event	1st	2nd	3rd
Olympic Games	0	0	1
World Championships	3	2	1
European Championships	2	6	2
Total	5	8	4
Olympic Games
Bronze medal – third place	2000 Sydney	Women's duet
World Aquatics Championships
Gold medal – first place	2003 Barcelona	Women's solo
Gold medal – first place	2005 Montreal	Women's solo
Gold medal – first place	2007 Melbourne	Women's solo
Silver medal – second place	1998 Perth	Women's solo
Silver medal – second place	2001 Fukuoka	Women's solo
Bronze medal – third place	1998 Perth	Women's duet
European Aquatics Championships
Gold medal – first place	2002 Berlin	Women's solo
Gold medal – first place	2004 Madrid	Women's solo
Silver medal – second place	1997 Seville	Women's solo
Silver medal – second place	1997 Seville	Women's duet
Silver medal – second place	1999 Istanbul	Women's solo
Silver medal – second place	1999 Istanbul	Women's duet
Silver medal – second place	2000 Helsinki	Women's solo
Silver medal – second place	2000 Helsinki	Women's duet
Bronze medal – third place	2002 Berlin	Women's duet
Bronze medal – third place	2004 Madrid	Women's duet

Virginie Dedieu (born 25 February 1979) is a French former synchronized swimmer and Olympic medalist.

== Career ==
Virginie won a bronze medal in the women's duet at the 2000 Summer Olympics with Myriam Lignot. She was also successful in the European and World Aquatics Championships, winning several medals.

Dedieu was awarded the Legion of Honour on 1 January 2006.
