= Synchronised swimming at the 1998 World Aquatics Championships =

A synchronized swimming competition was held at the 1998 World Aquatics Championships, in Perth, Western Australia between 8 and 17 January 1998.

== Overview ==
Synchronised swimming is one of four disciplines that has been contested at every World Aquatics Championships, along with swimming, diving, and water polo. The 1998 competition was the seventh World Aquatics Championships. However, synchronised swimming is unique at the championships, in that only women compete in the discipline. For the 1998 edition, three events were contested; solo, duet, and team routines.

The Russian team was dominant, winning the gold medal in all three events contested. Olga Sedakova became only the fourth woman to win a gold medal in every discipline at the same championships, following Teresa Andersen in the first World Aquatics Championships in 1973, Carolyn Waldo in 1986, and Becky Dyroen-Lancer at the previous competition in 1994. North America had their worst showing ever at the World Aquatics Championships, Canada did not win any medals in synchronised swimming for the first time ever. The United States missed the podium in the solo and duet competitions, after winning at least one medal in those disciplines at every previous competition.

== Medal table ==
Rank	Nation	Gold	Silver	Bronze	Total
1	Russia (RUS)	3	0	0	3
2	Japan (JPN)	0	2	1	3
3	France (FRA)	0	1	1	2
4	United States (USA)	0	0	1	1
Totals (4 entries)		3	3	3	9

== Medal summary ==
Event	Gold	Silver	Bronze
Solo routine	Olga Sedakova (RUS); 99.304	Virginie Dedieu (FRA); 98.154	Miya Tachibana (JPN); 97.530
Duet routine	Olga Brusnikina (RUS); Olga Sedakova (RUS); 99.073	Miya Tachibana (JPN); Miho Takeda (JPN); 98.060	Virginie Dedieu (FRA); Myriam Lignot (FRA); 97.323
Team routine	Russia (RUS); Olga Sedakova; Mariya Kiselyova; Anna Yuryaeva; Olga Medvedeva; Olga Brusnikina; Elena Azarova; Olga Novokshchenova; Alexandra Vassina; Elena Barantseva; Anna Maslova; 99.317	Japan (JPN); Raika Fujii; Yoko Isoda; Miho Kawabe; Mika Kawabe; Rei Jimbo; Akiko Miyazaki; Riho Nakajima; Miya Tachibana; Miho Takeda; Yuko Yoneda; 98.104	United States (USA); Carrie Barton; Kara Duncan; Bridget Finn; Tracie Gayeski; Rebecca Jasontek; Tina Kasid; Kristina Lum; Emily Marsh; Elicia Marshall; Kim Wurzel; 96.829

== Multiple Medal Winners ==
Other than Sedakova, several other competitors won multiple medals. For Russia, Olga Brusnikina, won gold in the duet and team routines. Japan had two multiple winners; Miya Tachibana won bronze in the solo, and silver with partner Miho Takeda in both the duet and team competitions. For France Virginie Dedieu won a silver in the solo competition, and a bronze in the duet.
