= Olga Sedakova (synchronised swimmer) =

Russian synchronized swimmer

Personal information
- Full name: Olga Genrikhovna Sedakova
- Nationality: Russian
- Born: 6 March 1972 (age 54) Moscow, Russian SFSR, Soviet Union
- Height: 5 ft 8 in (173 cm)
- Weight: 57 kg (126 lb)

Sport
- Sport: Swimming
- Strokes: Synchronised swimming
- Club: Moskva Sports Club
Medal record
Women's synchronised swimming
Representing the Soviet Union (1991) Russia (1993–)
World Championships
Gold medal – first place	1998 Perth	Solo
Gold medal – first place	1998 Perth	Duet
Gold medal – first place	1998 Perth	Team
European Championships
Gold medal – first place	1991 Athens	Solo
Gold medal – first place	1991 Athens	Duet
Gold medal – first place	1991 Athens	Team
Gold medal – first place	1993 Sheffield	Solo
Gold medal – first place	1993 Sheffield	Duet
Gold medal – first place	1993 Sheffield	Team
Gold medal – first place	1995 Vienna	Solo
Gold medal – first place	1995 Vienna	Team
Gold medal – first place	1997 Seville	Solo
World Cup
Gold medal – first place	1997 Guangzhou	Solo
Gold medal – first place	1997 Guangzhou	Duet
Bronze medal – third place	1995 Atlanta	Solo
Bronze medal – third place	1995 Atlanta	Team

Olga Genrikhovna Sedakova (Russian: Ольга Генриховна Седакова; born 6 March 1972) is a former Russian synchronized swimmer who competed at two Olympic Games, won three gold medals in the World Championships, and nine golds at the European Championships. In 2019, she was inducted to the International Swimming Hall of Fame.

== Soviet and Unified Team ==
Sedakova's first major international competition was the 1991 World Championships held at Perth in January, where although she failed to win a medal, she placed fourth in both the solo and duet competitions, where she partnered with Gana Maximova. The 1991 European Aquatics Championships, held in Athens the following August was her breakout success- she swept the synchronized swimming events, winning gold medals in the solo competition, the duet competition with partner Anna Kozlova, and the team competition.

After the break-up of the Soviet Union, the former Soviet states (except the Baltic states) competed together at the 1992 Summer Olympics in Barcelona as the Unified Team. As part of the Unified Team, Sedakova competed in both the solo and duet routines- again partnering with Kozlova. During the competition, Sedakova and Koslava's coach quit on them leaving them to finish the competition alone. Sedakova placed fourth in both events; Following Barcelona both events were dropped from the Olympic program and replaced with a team competition.

== Russia ==
Russia competed as an independent country at the 1993 European Aquatics Championships in Sheffield, and Sedakova again completed her trifecta winning gold medals in all three events contested. The 1993 European Championships would be Sedakova's last partnering in the duet with Anna Kozlova, as Kozlova defected to the United States shortly after the competition. At the 1994 World Championships, Sedakova again placed fourth in the solo competition.

In Vienna, for the 1995 European Aquatics Championships, Sedakova again won the gold medal in solo competition, as well as the team gold with Russia. Also in 1995, at the World Cup in Atlanta, she won two bronze medals, in the solo and team competitions. She returned to Atlanta to compete in the 1996 Summer Olympics, where the Russian team finished in fourth place.

Sedakova experienced her first victory on a global stage at the 1997 World Cup in Guangzhou, where she won the solo competition, and the duet competition with new partner Olga Brusnikina. That same year, at the 1997 European Aquatics Championships, she won her fourth consecutive solo gold medal, the most by any swimmer in that discipline.

She returned to Perth for the 1998 World Aquatics Championships, where she experienced the greatest success in her career. She won gold in all three events contested; the solo competition, the duet with Olga Brusnikina, and the team competition. Sedakova was only the fourth person to sweep every event at a single championships, following Teresa Andersen in the first World Aquatics Championships in 1973, Carolyn Waldo in 1986, and Becky Dyroen-Lancer at the previous competition in 1994. Despite her resounding success, it would be her last major competition.
