= Elicia Marshall =

American synchronized swimmer (born 1979)

Personal information
- Full name: Elicia Fayre Marshall
- National team: United States
- Born: September 3, 1979 (age 46) San Jose, California, U.S.
- Height: 1.70 m (5 ft 7 in)
- Weight: 62 kg (137 lb)

Sport
- Sport: Swimming
- Strokes: Synchronized swimming
- Club: Santa Clara Aquamaids
Medal record
Women's synchronized swimming
Representing the United States
World Championships
Silver medal – second place	1998 Perth	Team

Elicia Marshall (born September 3, 1979) is a former synchronized swimmer from the United States.

Elicia competed in the women's team event at the 2000 Summer Olympics, finishing in fifth place.
