= Kim Wurzel =

American synchronized swimmer

Personal information
- Full name: Kim Wurzel
- National team: United States
- Born: September 18, 1976 (age 49) San Jose, California, U.S.
- Height: 1.63 m (5 ft 4 in)
- Weight: 53 kg (117 lb)

Sport
- Sport: Swimming
- Strokes: Synchronized swimming
- Club: Santa Clara Aquamaids
Medal record
Women's synchronized swimming
Representing United States
World Championships
Silver medal – second place	1998 Perth	Team

Kim Wurzel (born September 18, 1976) is a former synchronized swimmer from the United States.

Kim competed in the women's team event at the 2000 Summer Olympics, finishing in fifth place.

Wurzel retired from the pool in 2001 to start a career as a swimming coach, and in 2012 she was named the United States Synchronized Swimming Coach of the Year. In 2013, she quit her job to become a real estate agent.
