= Carrie Barton =

American synchronized swimmer (born 1976)

Personal information
- Full name: Carrie Elizabeth Barton
- National team: United States
- Born: May 19, 1976 (age 50) Santa Clara, California
- Height: 1.65 m (5 ft 5 in)
- Weight: 59 kg (130 lb)

Sport
- Sport: Swimming
- Strokes: Synchronized swimming
- Club: Santa Clara Aquamaids
Medal record
Women's synchronized swimming
Representing United States
World Championships
Silver medal – second place	1998 Perth	Team

Carrie Barton (born May 19, 1976) is a former synchronized swimmer from the United States. Barton competed in the women's team event at the 2000 Summer Olympics, finishing in fifth place. In 2012, she was inducted into the United States Synchronized Swimming Hall of Fame.
