= Basketball at the 2000 Summer Olympics – Women's team rosters =

Twelve women's teams competed in basketball at the 2000 Summer Olympics.

== Australia ==
- Sandy Brondello
- Michelle Brogan
- Carla Boyd
- Jo Hill
- Kristi Harrower
- Shelley Sandie
- Annie la Fleur
- Trisha Fallon
- Lauren Jackson
- Rachael Sporn
- Michele Timms
- Jenny Whittle

- Head coach: Tom Maher

== Brazil ==
- Adriana Aparecida dos Santos
- Adrianinha
- Alessandra Santos de Oliveira
- Cíntia Tuiú
- Claudinha
- Helen Cristina Santos Luz
- Zaine
- Janeth dos Santos Arcain
- Kelly da Silva Santos
- Lílian Cristina Lopes Gonçalves
- Marta de Souza Sobral
- Silvinha

== Canada ==
- Cori-Lyn Blakebrough
- Carolin Bouchard
- Kelly Boucher
- Claudia Brassard-Riebesehl
- Stacey Dales-Schuman
- Michelle Hendry
- Nikki Johnson
- Karla Karch
- Teresa Kleindienst
- Joy McNichol
- Dianne Norman
- Tammy Sutton-Brown

== Cuba ==
- Liset Castillo
- Milayda Enríquez
- Cariola Hechavarría
- Dalia Henry
- Grisel Herrera
- María León
- Yamilé Martínez
- Yaquelín Plutín
- Tania Seino
- Yuliseny Soria
- Taimara Suero
- Lisdeivis Víctores

== France ==
- Laure Savasta
- Sandra Le Drean
- Catherine Melain
- Edwige Lawson
- Yannick Souvré
- Audrey Sauret
- Nathalie Lesdema
- Stéphanie Vivenot
- Dominique Tonnerre
- Isabelle Fijalkowski
- Laëtitia Moussard
- Nicole Antibe

== New Zealand ==
- Tania Brunton
- Belinda Colling
- Megan Compain
- Rebecca Cotton
- Kirstin Daly
- Gina Farmer
- Sally Farmer
- Dianne L'Ami
- Donna Loffhagen
- Julie Ofsoski
- Leone Patterson
- Leanne Walker

== Poland ==
- Dorota Bukowska
- Joanna Cupryś
- Patrycja Czepiec
- Katarzyna Dydek
- Margo Dydek
- Edyta Koryzna
- Ilona Mądra
- Beata Predehl
- Krystyna Szymańska-Lara
- Elżbieta Trześniewska
- Anna Wielebnowska
- Sylwia Wlaźlak

== Russia ==
- Svetlana Abrosimova
- Anna Arkhipova
- Elen Shakirova
- Yelena Khudashova
- Yevgeniya Nikonova
- Irina Rutkovskaya
- Irina Sumnikova
- Maria Stepanova
- Natalya Zasulskaya
- Yelena Pshikova
- Olga Arteshina

== Senegal ==
- Mame Maty Mbengue
- Bineta Diouf
- Yacine Khady Ngom
- Coumba Cissé
- Marieme Lo
- Awa Guèye
- Ndialou Paye
- Mbarika Fall
- Khady Diop
- Adama Diakhaté
- Fatime N'Diaye
- Astou N'Diaye

== Slovakia ==
- Slávka Frniaková
- Martina Godályová
- Renáta Hiráková
- Dagmar Huťková
- Marcela Kalistová
- Anna Kotočová
- Alena Kováčová
- Lívia Libičová
- Jana Lichnerová
- Martina Luptáková
- Katarína Poláková
- Zuzana Žirková

== South Korea ==
Korean names listed by family name first

- Lee Mi-Sun
- Chun Joo-Weon
- Kim Ji-Yoon
- Lee Eun-ju
- Jang Sun-Hyoung
- Wang Su-Jin
- Yang Jung-Ok
- Park Jung-Eun
- Kang Ji-Sook
- Lee Jong-Ae
- Jung Sun-Min
- Chung Eun-Soon

== United States ==
- Ruthie Bolton
- Teresa Edwards
- Yolanda Griffith
- Chamique Holdsclaw (retained on the roster, but did not play due to injury)
- Lisa Leslie
- Nikki McCray
- DeLisha Milton
- Katie Smith
- Dawn Staley
- Sheryl Swoopes
- Natalie Williams
- Kara Wolters

- Head Coach: Nell Fortner
