= Poland at the 2000 Summer Olympics =

- IOC code: POL
- NOC: Polish Olympic Committee
- Website: www.pkol.pl (in Polish)

in Sydney
- Competitors: 187 (129 men and 58 women) in 20 sports
- Flag bearer: Andrzej Wroński
- Medals Ranked 14th: Gold 6 Silver 5 Bronze 3 Total 14

Summer Olympics appearances (overview)
- 1924; 1928; 1932; 1936; 1948; 1952; 1956; 1960; 1964; 1968; 1972; 1976; 1980; 1984; 1988; 1992; 1996; 2000; 2004; 2008; 2012; 2016; 2020; 2024; 2028

Other related appearances
- Russian Empire (1900, 1912); Austria (1908–1912)

Poland competed at the 2000 Summer Olympics in Sydney, Australia. 187 competitors, 129 men and 58 women, took part in 133 events in 20 sports.

== Medalists ==
Medal	Name	Sport	Event	Date
Gold	Robert Korzeniowski	Athletics	Men's 20 km walk	22 September
Gold	Robert Korzeniowski	Athletics	Men's 50 km walk	29 September
Gold	Tomasz Kucharski; Robert Sycz	Rowing	Men's lightweight double sculls	24 September
Gold	Renata Mauer	Shooting	Women's 50 m rifle three positions	20 September
Gold	Kamila Skolimowska	Athletics	Women's hammer throw	29 September
Gold	Szymon Ziółkowski	Athletics	Men's hammer throw	24 September
Silver	Sylwia Gruchała; Magdalena Mroczkiewicz; Anna Rybicka; Barbara Wolnicka-Szewczyk	Fencing	Women's team foil	23 September
Silver	Daniel Jędraszko; Paweł Baraszkiewicz	Canoeing	Men's C-2 500 metres	1 October
Silver	Szymon Kołecki	Weightlifting	Men's 94 kg	24 September
Silver	Krzysztof Kołomański; Michał Staniszewski	Canoeing	Men's slalom C-2	20 September
Silver	Agata Wróbel	Weightlifting	Women's +75 kg	22 September
Bronze	Leszek Blanik	Gymnastics	Men's vault	22 September
Bronze	Grzegorz Kotowicz; Adam Seroczyński; Dariusz Białkowski; Marek Witkowski	Canoeing	Men's K-4 1000 metres	30 September
Bronze	Beata Sokołowska; Aneta Pastuszka	Canoeing	Women's K-2 500 metres	1 October

== Archery ==
Poland entered three women and two men in its seventh appearance in Olympic archery. Four of the five archers won their first match, with Joanna Nowicka making it to the quarterfinal and taking eighth place.

Athlete	Event	Ranking round		Round of 64	Round of 32	Round of 16	Quarterfinals	Semifinals	Final / BM	
Athlete	Event	Score	Seed	Opposition Score	Opposition Score	Opposition Score	Opposition Score	Opposition Score	Opposition Score	Rank
Grzegorz Targoński	Men's individual	633	21	Matsushita (JPN) (44); W 166–164	van Alten (NED) (12); L 157–160	did not advance				22
Bartosz Mikos	Men's individual	606	49	Fu S (CHN) (16); W 157–155	Tsyrempilov (RUS) (17); L 154–163	did not advance				23
Joanna Nowicka	Women's individual	633	24	Moroz (BLR) (41); W 152–139	Ericsson (SWE) (9); W 162–152	Yang J (CHN) (25); W 162–158	Kim S-N (KOR) (1); L 106–100	did not advance		8
Anna Łęcka	Women's individual	630	28	Plotnikova (KAZ) (37); W 163–149	Sadovnycha (UKR) (5); W 159–158	Bolotova (RUS) (21); L 161–157	did not advance			13
Agata Bulwa	Women's individual	603	60	Sadovnycha (UKR) (5); L 163–155	did not advance					37
Joanna Nowicka; Agata Bulwa; Anna Łęcka	Team	1866	11	—N/a		Turkey (6); L 217–227	did not advance			11

== Athletics ==
Men
Track & road events

Athlete	Event	Heat		Quarterfinal		Semifinal		Final	
Athlete	Event	Result	Rank	Result	Rank	Result	Rank	Result	Rank
Piotr Balcerzak	100 m	10.42	36 Q	10.38	29	did not advance			
Piotr Gładki	Marathon	—N/a						DNF	
Piotr Haczek	400 m	45.61	14 Q	45.43	13 Q	45.66	12	did not advance	
Paweł Januszewski	400 m hurdles	51.40	48 Q	—N/a		48.42	5 q	48.44	6
Robert Korzeniowski	20 km walk	—N/a						1:18:59	
Robert Korzeniowski	50 km walk	—N/a						3:42:22	
Marcin Kuśzewski	110 m hurdles	DNF		did not advance					
Tomasz Lipiec	50 km walk	—N/a						DNF	
Robert Maćkowiak	400 m	45.39	7 Q	45.01	2 Q	45.53	8 Q	45.14	5
Roman Magdziarczyk	50 km walk	—N/a						3:48:17	8
Marcin Nowak	100 m	10.27	7 Q	10.37	27	did not advance			
Piotr Rysiukiewicz	400 m	46.67	50	did not advance					
Tomasz Ścigaczewski	110 m hurdles	13.53	5 Q	13.60	12 Q	13.51	12	did not advance	
Marcin Urbaś	200 m	20.62	10 Q	20.43	13	did not advance			
Rafał Wójcik	3000 m steeplechase	08:33.51	21	—N/a				did not advance	
Piotr Balcerzak; Marcin Nowak; Ryszard Pilarczyk; Marcin Urbaś	4 × 100 m relay	38.74	4 q	—N/a		38.60	6 q	38.96	8
Jacek Bocian; Piotr Długosielski; Piotr Haczek; Robert Maćkowiak; Piotr Rysiukiewicz; Filip Walotka	4 × 400 m relay	03:01.30	2 Q	—N/a		03:00.66	5 q	03:03.22	6

Field events

Athlete	Event	Qualification		Final	
Athlete	Event	Distance	Position	Distance	Position
Maciej Pałyszko	Hammer throw	76.33	13	did not advance	
Olgierd Stański	Discus throw	59.31	29	did not advance	
Dariusz Trafas	Javelin throw	83.98	7 Q	82.30	10
Szymon Ziółkowski	Hammer throw	77.81	4 Q	80.02	

Women
Track & road events

Athlete	Event	Heat		Quarterfinal		Semifinal		Final	
Athlete	Event	Result	Rank	Result	Rank	Result	Rank	Result	Rank
Lidia Chojecka	1500 m	04:10.34	14 Q	—N/a		04:05.78	5 Q	04:06.42	5
Anna Jakubczak	1500 m	04:08.13	2 Q	—N/a		04:07.03	10 Q	04:06.49	6
Anna Olichwierczuk	400 m hurdles	57.36	21	—N/a		did not advance			
Zuzanna Radecka	100 m	23.57	38	did not advance					
Katarzyna Radtke	20 km walk	—N/a						DNF	
Joanna Niełacna; Marzena Pawlak; Agnieszka Rysiukiewicz; Zuzanna Radecka	4 × 100 m relay	44.05	15 Q	—N/a		44.07	15	did not advance	

Field events

Athlete	Event	Qualification		Final	
Athlete	Event	Distance	Position	Distance	Position
Krystyna Danilczyk-Zabawska	Shot put	18.93	4 Q	19.18	5
Monika Pyrek	Pole vault	4.30	12 q	4.40	7
Kamila Skolimowska	Hammer throw	66.30	3 Q	71.16 OR	
Katarzyna Żakowicz	Shot put	16.95	18	did not advance	

Combined events – Heptathlon

Athlete	Event	100H	HJ	SP	200 m	LJ	JT	800 m	Final	Rank
Urszula Włodarczyk	Result	13.33	1.78	14.45	24.29	6.31	46.16	02:12.15	6470	4
Urszula Włodarczyk	Points	1075	953	824	953	946	786	933	6470	4

== Badminton ==
Athlete	Event	Round of 64	Round of 32	Round of 16	Quarterfinal	Semifinal	Final / BM
Athlete	Event	Opposition Score	Opposition Score	Opposition Score	Opposition Score	Opposition Score	Rank
Katarzyna Krasowska	Women's singles	Grether (GER); L 12–13, 2–11	did not advance				
Michał Łogosz; Robert Mateusiak	Men's doubles	—N/a	Bamford / Blackburn (AUS); W 15–5, 16–17, 15–6	Archer / Robertson (GBR); L 1–15, 10–15	did not advance		

== Basketball ==
- Team roster

- Dorota Bukowska
- Joanna Cupryś
- Patrycja Czepiec
- Katarzyna Dydek
- Małgorzata Dydek
- Edyta Koryzna
- Ilona Mądra
- Beata Predehl
- Krystyna Szymańska-Lara
- Elżbieta Trześniewska
- Anna Wielebnowska
- Sylwia Wlaźlak

- Group play

=== Group B ===
Team	W	L	PF	PA	PD	Pts	Tie
United States	5	0	446	312	+134	10	
Russia	3	2	398	325	+73	8	1.30
South Korea	3	2	343	296	+47	8	0.91
Poland	3	2	327	339	−12	8	0.84
Cuba	1	4	318	358	−40	6	
New Zealand	0	5	304	396	−92	5	

16 September
9:30

Poland	75–52	New Zealand

The Dome, Sydney

18 September
11:30

Russia	84–46	Poland

The Dome, Sydney

20 September
19:30

Poland	87–62	South Korea

The Dome, Sydney

22 September
21:30

Poland	72–65	Cuba

The Dome, Sydney

24 September
19:30

United States	76–57	Poland

The Dome, Sydney

=== Quarter-finals ===
27 September
19:30

Australia	76–48	Poland

The Dome, Sydney

=== Classification matches ===
29 September
9:30

7th place

Slovakia	64–57	Poland

Sydney Superdome, Sydney

== Boxing ==
Men

Athlete	Event	Round of 32	Round of 16	Quarterfinals	Semifinals	Final	
Athlete	Event	Opposition Result	Opposition Result	Opposition Result	Opposition Result	Opposition Result	Rank
Andrzej Rżany	Flyweight	Augustin (MAD); W RSC	Lerio (PHI); L 18*-18	Sidorenko (UKR); L RSC	did not advance		5
Robert Ciba	Bantamweight	Sabo (NGR); L RSC-3	did not advance				
Mariusz Cendrowski	Light welterweight	Hwang (KOR); L 4–14	did not advance				
Paweł Kakietek	Middleweight	Abudoureheman (CHN); W RSC	Lacy (USA); L 7–21	did not advance			
Wojciech Bartnik	Heavyweight	—N/a	Bennett (USA); L 2–11	did not advance			
Grzegorz Kiełsa	Super Heavyweight	—N/a	Dildabekov (KAZ); L 5–16	did not advance			

== Canoeing ==
=== Slalom ===
Athlete	Event	Qualifying				Final			
Athlete	Event	Run 1	Run 2	Result	Rank	Run 1	Run 2	Result	Rank
Krzysztof Bieryt	Men's C-1	132.85	132.19	265.04	3 Q	126.36	126.87	253.23	11
Krzysztof Kołomański; Michał Staniszewski	Men's C-2	148.46	137.48	285.94	6 Q	124.19	119.62	243.81	
Andrzej Wójs; Sławomir Mordarski	Men's C-2	144.48	142.48	286.96	7 Q	121.74	133.77	255.51	6
Beata Grzesik	Women's K-1	208.80	147.58	356.38	19	did not advance			

=== Sprint ===
Men

Athlete	Event	Heats		Semifinals		Final	
Athlete	Event	Time	Rank	Time	Rank	Time	Rank
Michał Gajownik	C-1 500 m	02:04.704	9	did not advance			18
Daniel Jędraszko	C-1 1000 m	04:25.726	9	did not advance			18
Grzegorz Kotowicz	K-1 500 m	1:40.204	1 Q	1:41.198	3 Q	2:07.711	9
Rafał Głażewski	K-1 1000 m	3:43.227	6 Q	3:46.761	8	did not advance	21
Daniel Jędraszko; Paweł Baraszkiewicz	C-2 500 m	1:41.511	1 Q	BYE		1:51.536	
Paweł Baraszkiewicz; Michał Gajownik	C-2 1000 m	3:39.311	3 Q	BYE		3:52.229	8
Marek Twardowski; Adam Wysocki	K-2 500 m	1:32.350	2 Q	1:30.026	2 Q	1:48.963	5
Marek Twardowski; Adam Wysocki	K-2 1000 m	3:15.909	5 Q	3:18.026	3 Q	3:19.939	8
Dariusz Białkowski; Grzegorz Kotowicz; Adam Seroczyński; Marek Witkowski	K-4 1000 m	3:00.166	2 Q	BYE		2:55.704	

Women

Athlete	Event	Heats		Semifinals		Final	
Athlete	Event	Time	Rank	Time	Rank	Time	Rank
Elżbieta Urbańczyk	K-1 500 m	1:53.202	3 Q	BYE		2:18.018	5
Aneta Pastuszka; Beata Sokołowska	K-2 500 m	1:42.905	2 Q	BYE		1:58.784	
Aneta Pastuszka; Joanna Skowroń; Aneta Michalak; Beata Sokołowska	K-4 500 m	1:35.887	2 Q	BYE		1:37.076	4

== Cycling ==
=== Road ===
Athlete	Event	Time	Rank
Piotr Chmielewski	Men's road race	DNF	
Piotr Wadecki	Men's road race	5:30:35	7
Piotr Wadecki	Men's time trial	1:02:04	31
Zbigniew Piątek	Men's road race	5:30:46	48
Piotr Przydział	Men's road race	5:30:46	58
Zbigniew Spruch	Men's road race	5:30:46	20

=== Track ===
1000m time trial

Athlete	Event	Time	Rank
Grzegorz Krejner	Men's 1000m time trial	01:04.156	7

Men's Sprint

Athlete	Event	Qualifying round		1/16		1/16 repechage		1/8 final		1/8 repechage		Classification 9–12		Quarter-finals		Classification 5–8		Semi-finals		Finals	
Athlete	Event	Time	Rank	Time	Rank	Time	Rank	Time	Rank	Time	Rank	Time	Rank	Time	Rank	Time	Rank	Time	Rank	Time	Rank
Bartłomiej Saczuk	Men's sprint	11.106	19	did not advance																	

Team sprint

Athlete	Event	Qualification		First round		Final	
Athlete	Event	Time Speed (km/h)	Rank	Opposition Time Speed (km/h)	Rank	Opposition Time Speed (km/h)	Rank
Konrad Czajkowski; Grzegorz Krejner; Marcin Mientki	Men's team sprint	46.186; 58.459	10	did not advance			

Men's Keirin

Athlete	Event	First round		First repechage		Second round		Finals	
Athlete	Event	Time	Rank	Time	Rank	Time	Rank	Time	Rank
Grzegorz Krejner	Men's keirin	6	3	did not advance					

=== Mountain biking ===
Athlete	Event	Time	Rank
Marek Galiński	Men's cross-country	2:17:35.54	21

== Fencing ==
Ten fencers, six men and four women, represented Poland in 2000.

Men

Athlete	Event	Round of 64	Round of 32	Round of 16	Quarterfinal	Semifinal	Final / BM	
Athlete	Event	Opposition Score	Opposition Score	Opposition Score	Opposition Score	Opposition Score	Opposition Score	Rank
Adam Krzesiński	Individual foil	BYE	D Shevchenko (RUS); L 8–15	did not advance				26
Sławomir Mocek	Individual foil	Ben Aziza (TUN); W 15–2	García (CUB); W 15–9	Breutner (GER); L 8–15	did not advance			16
Ryszard Sobczak	Individual foil	BYE	Bayer (USA); L 9–15	did not advance				24
Adam Krzesiński; Ryszard Sobczak; Sławomir Mocek	Team foil	—N/a			Germany; W 45–37	France; L 38–45	Italy; L 38–45	4
Norbert Jaskot	Individual sabre	BYE	Covaliu (ROU); L 12–15	did not advance				26
Marcin Sobala	Individual sabre	Frosin (RUS); L 11–15	did not advance					24
Rafał Sznajder	Individual sabre	BYE	Huttsait (UKR); L 14–15	did not advance				22
Janusz Olech; Norbert Jaskot; Rafał Sznajder	Team sabre	—N/a		BYE	Romania; L 26–45	Classification semi-final Hungary; L 41–45	7th place final Italy; W 45–39	7

Women

Athlete	Event	Round of 64	Round of 32	Round of 16	Quarterfinal	Semifinal	Final / BM	
Athlete	Event	Opposition Score	Opposition Score	Opposition Score	Opposition Score	Opposition Score	Opposition Score	Rank
Sylwia Gruchała	Individual foil	BYE	Knapek (HUN); W 15–8	Vezzali (ITA); L 8–15	did not advance			13
Magdalena Mroczkiewicz	Individual foil	BYE	Boyko (RUS); W 15–9	Xiao A (CHN); L 13–15	did not advance			14
Anna Rybicka	Individual foil	BYE	Meng J (CHN); L 9–15	did not advance				22
Sylwia Gruchała; Magdalena Mroczkiewicz; Anna Rybicka; Barbara Wolnicka-Szewczyk	Team foil	—N/a		BYE	China; W 45–43	Germany; W 45–34	Italy; L 36–45	

== Gymnastics ==
=== Artistic ===
Men

Athlete	Event	Qualification								Final							
Athlete	Event	Apparatus						Total	Rank	Apparatus						Total	Rank
Athlete	Event	F	PH	R	V	PB	HB	Total	Rank	F	PH	R	V	PB	HB	Total	Rank
Leszek Blanik	Vault	—N/a	8.575	9.275	9.700 Q	8.775	—N/a			—N/a			9.475	—N/a		9.475	

Women

Athlete	Event	Qualification						Final					
Athlete	Event	Apparatus				Total	Rank	Apparatus				Total	Rank
Athlete	Event	V	UB	BB	F	Total	Rank	V	UB	BB	F	Total	Rank
Joanna Skowrońska	Individual all-around	8.750	8.962	8.450	8.425	34.587	60	—N/a					

=== Rhythmic gymnastics ===
Athlete	Event	Qualification						Final					
Athlete	Event	Rope	Hoop	Ball	Ribbon	Total	Rank	Rope	Hoop	Ball	Ribbon	Total	Rank
Agnieszka Brandebura	Individual	9.716	9.470	9.791	9.600	38.577	13	did not advance					

== Field hockey ==
=== Pool B ===
Team	Pld	W	D	L	GF	GA	Pts
Australia	5	3	2	0	12	6	11
South Korea	5	2	2	1	9	7	8
India	5	2	2	1	9	7	8
Argentina	5	1	2	2	13	13	5
Poland	5	1	2	2	12	14	4
Spain	5	0	2	3	7	15	2

Advanced to semifinals

17 September 2000
08:30

Australia	4–0	Poland
Elmer 34', 52'; Stacy 47'; Brennan 58'	Report

Umpires:
Christian Siebrecht (GER)
Jason McCracken (NZL)

19 September 2000
10:30

Spain	1–4	Poland
Arnau 51'	Report	Grzeszczak 15'; Mikula 16', 38'; Grotowski 28'

Umpires:
Amarjit Singh (MAS)
Steven Horgan (USA)

21 September 2000
10:30

Argentina	5–5	Poland
Lombi 6', 23', 41', 63'; Capurro 66'	Report	L. Wybieralski 31'; Mikula 45', 51'; Jakubiak 60'; Grotowski 67'

Umpires:
Jason McCracken (NZL)
Sumesh Putra (CAN)

24 September 2000
21:00

Poland	2–3	South Korea
Grotowski 53'; Mikula 62'	Report	Yeo Woon-Kon 11'; Kang Keon-Wook 18'; Hwang Jong-Hyun 37'

Umpires:
Christian Siebrecht (GER)
Jason McCracken (NZL)

26 September 2000
20:30

Poland	1–1	India
Cichy 69'	Report	Tirkey 53'

Umpires:
Eric Denis (BEL)
Christian Siebrecht (GER)

=== Crossover ===
28 September 2000
17:30

Canada	3–2	Poland
Gifford 37'; Wettlaufer 39'; Bird 59'	Report	K. Wybieralski 23'; Gaczkowski 45'

Umpires:
Henrik Ehlers (DEN)
Amrjit Singh (MAS)

=== Eleventh and twelfth place ===
30 September 2000
11:30

Malaysia	3–2 (a.e.t.)	Poland
Mirnawan 5'; Nor Saiful 48'; Kuhan 73'	Report	L. Wybieralski 17'; Jakubiak 52'

Umpires:
Henrik Ehlers (DEN)
Murray Grime (AUS)

- Team roster

- [01.] Paweł Sobczak (gk)
- [03.] Paweł Jakubiak
- [04.] Dariusz Małecki
- [06.] Tomasz Szmidt
- [07.] Robert Grzeszczak
- [08.] Zbigniew Juszczak
- [10.] Rafał Grotowski
- [13.] Krzysztof Wybieralski
- [14.] Tomasz Choczaj
- [15.] Piotr Mikuła
- [17.] Tomasz Cichy
- [19.] Dariusz Marcinkowski
- [20.] Łukasz Wybieralski
- [21.] Aleksander Korcz
- [25.] Eugeniusz Gaczkowski
- [30.] Marcin Pobuta (gk)

- Head coach: Jerzy Wybieralski

== Judo ==
Men

Athlete	Event	Preliminary	Round of 32	Round of 16	Quarterfinals	Semifinals	Repechage 1	Repechage 2	Repechage 3	Final / BM	
Athlete	Event	Opposition Result	Opposition Result	Opposition Result	Opposition Result	Opposition Result	Opposition Result	Opposition Result	Opposition Result	Opposition Result	Rank
Jarosław Lewak	−73 kg	BYE	Stangl (AUT); W 1000-0000	Nakamura (JPN); L 0000-1001	did not advance						AC
Robert Krawczyk	−81 kg	Arteaga (CUB); L 0000-1000	did not advance								AC
Paweł Nastula	−100 kg	BYE	Ze'evi (ISR); L 0000-1110	did not advance							AC
Rafał Kubacki	+100 kg	BYE	Rusliakov (UKR); L 0001-0003	did not advance							AC

Women

Athlete	Event	Round of 32	Round of 16	Quarterfinals	Semifinals	Repechage 1	Repechage 2	Repechage 3	Final / BM	
Athlete	Event	Opposition Result	Opposition Result	Opposition Result	Opposition Result	Opposition Result	Opposition Result	Opposition Result	Opposition Result	Rank
Beata Maksymow	+78 kg	BYE	Rosensteel (USA); L 0010–0001	did not advance						AC

== Modern pentathlon ==
Athlete	Event	Shooting (10 m air pistol)			Fencing (épée one touch)			Swimming (200 m freestyle)			Riding (show jumping)			Running (3000 m)			Total points	Final rank
Athlete	Event	Points	Rank	MP Points	Time	Rank	MP points	Wins	Rank	MP points	Penalties	Rank	MP points	Time	Rank	MP Points	Total points	Final rank
Igor Warabida	Men's	170	21	976	10	17	760	2:11.96	18	1181	90	7	1010	9:26.97	6	1134	5061	15
Paulina Boenisz	Women's	177	9	1060	11	12	800	2:27.96	17	1121	60	7	1040	11:00.66	5	1078	5099	5
Dorota Idzi	Women's	167	20	940	12	18	840	2:22.78	8	1173	192	15	908	11:55.09	18	860	4721	16

== Rowing ==
Men

Athlete	Event	Heats		Repechage		Semifinals		Final	
Athlete	Event	Time	Rank	Time	Rank	Time	Rank	Time	Rank
Piotr Basta; Piotr Bochenek	Pair	6:58.47	5 R	6:48.74	2 Q	6:43.38	5 FB	6:39.44	10
Adam Korol; Marek Kolbowicz	Double Sculls	6:31.91	2 R	6:32.30	1 Q	6:31.26	3 Q	6:32.11	6
Karol Łazar; Sławomir Kruszkowski; Adam Bronikowski; Michał Wojciechowski	Quadruple sculls	5:58.09	3 Q	BYE		6:02.11	6 FB	5:51.79	8
Paweł Jarosiński; Rafał Smoliński; Artur Rozalski} Arkadiusz Sobkowiak	Coxless four	6:22.00	4 R	6:15.75	4	did not advance			
Robert Sycz; Tomasz Kucharski	Lwt double scull	6:34.28	1 Q	BYE		6:20.60	1 Q	6:21.75	

Women

Athlete	Event	Heats		Repechages		Semifinals		Final	
Athlete	Event	Time	Rank	Time	Rank	Time	Rank	Time	Rank
Agnieszka Tomczak	Single sculls	7:43.99	2 R	7:47.37	2 Q	7:45.64	4 FB	7:33.20	8
Elżbieta Kuncewicz; Ilona Mokronowska	Lwt double scull	7:28.99	4 R	7:20.87	3 Q	7:08.73	4 FB	7:12.76	8

== Sailing ==
Poland competed in seven Sailing events with three top 10 finishes.

Men

Athlete	Event	Race											Net points	Final rank
Athlete	Event	1	2	3	4	5	6	7	8	9	10	M*	Net points	Final rank
Przemysław Miarczyński	Mistral	~~19~~	8	7	14	2	8	15	~~18~~	10	6	14	84	8
Mateusz Kusznierewicz	Finn	1	4	11	8	~~15~~	3	~~12~~	9	5	6	1	48	4
Tomasz Jakubiak; Tomasz Stańczyk	470	~~OCS~~	~~27~~	25	25	26	5	14	8	5	23	13	144	20

Women

Athlete	Event	Race											Net points	Final rank
Athlete	Event	1	2	3	4	5	6	7	8	9	10	M*	Net points	Final rank
Anna Gałecka	Mistral	8	7	~~13~~	5	8	9	12	7	~~14~~	13	11	80	11
Monika Bronicka	Europe	~~14~~	11	13	14	~~23~~	8	12	7	12	13	5	95	14

Open

Athlete	Event	Race																Net points	Final rank
Athlete	Event	1	2	3	4	5	6	7	8	9	10	11	12	13	14	15	M*	Net points	Final rank
Maciej Grabowski	Laser	11	24	~~34~~	5	2	9	~~30~~	13	9	2	—N/a					11	86	7
Pawel Kacprowski; Pawel Kuźmicki	49er	12	14	8	~~16~~	~~16~~	6	7	13	14	8	12	14	13	15	3	2	141	12

== Shooting ==
Men

Athlete	Event	Qualification		Final	
Athlete	Event	Score	Rank	Score	Rank
Andrzej Głyda	Skeet	121	14	did not advance	
Krzysztof Kucharczyk	25 m rapid fire pistol	584	8 Q	682.2	7
Jerzy Pietrzak	10 m air pistol	578	11	did not advance	
Jerzy Pietrzak	50 m pistol	560	9	did not advance	

Women

Athlete	Event	Qualification		Final	
Athlete	Event	Score	Rank	Score	Rank
Renata Mauer	50 m rifle three positions	585	3 Q	684.6	
Renata Mauer	10 m air rifle	392	15	did not advance	
Mirosława Sagun	10 m air pistol	379	16	did not advance	

== Swimming ==
Men

Athlete	Event	Heat		Semifinal		Final	
Athlete	Event	Time	Rank	Time	Rank	Time	Rank
Marcin Kaczmarek	100 metre butterfly	54.32	26	did not advance			
Bartosz Kizierowski	50 metre freestyle	22.05	1 Q	22.35	7 Q	22.22	5
Bartosz Kizierowski	100 metre freestyle	49.84	17	did not advance			
Bartosz Kizierowski	100 metre backstroke	55.14	5 Q	55.34	7 Q	55.04	5
Marek Krawczyk	100 metre breaststroke	01:03.00	24	did not advance			
Marek Krawczyk	200 metre breaststroke	02:16.08	18	did not advance			
Mariusz Siembida	100 metre backstroke	56.27	20	did not advance			

Women

Athlete	Event	Heat		Semifinal		Final	
Athlete	Event	Time	Rank	Time	Rank	Time	Rank
Aleksandra Miciul	100 metre backstroke	01:04.51	25	did not advance			
Aleksandra Miciul	200 metre backstroke	02:16.71	23	did not advance			
Otylia Jędrzejczak	100 metre butterfly	58.66	4 Q	59.14	9	did not advance	
Otylia Jędrzejczak	200 metre butterfly	02:08.70	3 Q	02:07.81	3 Q	02:08.48	5
Alicja Pęczak	100 metre breaststroke	01:10.57	21	did not advance			
Alicja Pęczak	200 metre breaststroke	02:29.45	16 Q	02:30.02	15	did not advance	
Anna Uryniuk	200 metre butterfly	02:14.87	26	did not advance			
Otylia Jędrzejczak; Aleksandra Miciul; Alicja Pęczak; Anna Uryniuk	4 × 100 m medley relay	04:11.08	12	did not advance			

== Table tennis ==
Singles

Athlete	Event	Group round		Round of 32	Round of 16	Quarterfinals	Semifinals	Bronze medal	Final
Athlete	Event	Opposition Result	Rank	Opposition Result	Opposition Result	Opposition Result	Opposition Result	Opposition Result	Rank
Lucjan Błaszczyk	Men's singles	Group F Crişan (ROU); W 3 – 2 Gerada (AUS); W 3 – 0	1 Q	Gatien (FRA); W 3 – 0	Kong (CHN); L 2 – 3	did not advance			
Tomasz Krzeszewski	Men's singles	Group K Lavale (AUS); W 3 – 0 Heister (NED); L 0 – 3	2	did not advance					

Doubles

Athlete	Event	Group round		Round of 16	Quarterfinals	Semifinals	Bronze medal	Final	
Athlete	Event	Opposition Result	Rank	Opposition Result	Opposition Result	Opposition Result	Opposition Result	Opposition Result	Rank
Lucjan Błaszczyk; Tomasz Krzeszewski	Men's doubles	Group F Hoyama / Issamu (BRA); W 2 – 0 Korbel / Plachy (CZE); W 2 – 0	1 Q	Kong / Liu G (CHN); L 2 – 3	did not advance				

== Weightlifting ==
Men

Athlete	Event	Snatch			Clean & Jerk			Total	Rank
Athlete	Event	1	2	3	1	2	3	Total	Rank
Krzysztof Siemion	– 85 kg	162.5	~~167.5~~	167.5	202.5	207.5	212.5	380.0	4
Mariusz Rytkowski	– 85 kg	160.0	165.0	170.0	200.0	~~205.0~~	~~205.0~~	370.0	9
Szymon Kołecki	– 94 kg	175.0	180.0	182.5	222.5	~~227.5~~	~~-~~	405.0	
Grzegorz Kleszcz	– 105 kg	180.0	185.0	~~190.0~~	220.0	~~227.5~~	~~227.5~~	405.0	8
Mariusz Jędra	– 105 kg	175.0	~~180.0~~	~~180.0~~	~~215.0~~	215.0	~~220.0~~	390.0	9
Paweł Najdek	+ 105 kg	180.0	~~185.0~~	185.0	240.0	~~245.0~~	~~250.0~~	425.0	7

Women

Athlete	Event	Snatch			Clean & Jerk			Total	Rank
Athlete	Event	1	2	3	1	2	3	Total	Rank
Aleksandra Klejnowska	– 58 kg	85.0	90.0	~~92.5~~	~~112.5~~	~~112.5~~	112.5	202.5	5
Beata Prei	– 69 kg	95.0	100.0	~~102.5~~	125.0	~~130.0~~	~~130.0~~	225.0	8
Agata Wróbel	+ 75 kg	~~125.0~~	125.0	132.5	155.0	162.5	~~170.0~~	295.0	

== Wrestling ==
Men's freestyle

Athlete	Event	Elimination Pool				Quarterfinal	Semifinal	Final / BM	
Athlete	Event	Opposition Result	Opposition Result	Opposition Result	Rank	Opposition Result	Opposition Result	Opposition Result	Rank
Mariusz Dąbrowski	−69 kg	Sánchez (CUB); L 0–7	Kasabov (BUL); L 2–3	—N/a	3	did not advance			18
Marcin Jurecki	−76 kg	Ozoline (AUS); W 10–0	Muzayev (UKR); L 1–3	Eui-jae (KOR); L 1–5	3	did not advance			8
Marek Garmulewicz	−97 kg	Schmeichel (CAN); W 3–0	Szerda (AUS); W 3–0	Shemarov (BLR); W 3–2	1 Q	BYE	Bairamukov (KAZ); L 0–3	Kurtanidze (GEO); L 1–4	4

Men's Greco-Roman

Athlete	Event	Elimination Pool				Quarterfinal	Semifinal	Final / BM	
Athlete	Event	Opposition Result	Opposition Result	Opposition Result	Rank	Opposition Result	Opposition Result	Opposition Result	Rank
Dariusz Jabłoński	−54 kg	Kwon-ho (KOR); L 0–10	Assembekov (KAZ); L 2–7	—N/a	3	did not advance			19
Włodzimierz Zawadzki	−63 kg	Samurgashev (RUS); L 0–8	Eroğlu (TUR); L PA	—N/a	3	did not advance			19
Ryszard Wolny	−69 kg	Glushkov (RUS); L 1–8	Adzhi (UKR); W 7–1	Kopytov (BLR); W PA	2	did not advance			7
Artur Michalkiewicz	−76 kg	Iutana (SAM); W 11–0	Makaranka (BLR); L 1–4	Manukyan (UKR); L 2–8	3	did not advance			9
Andrzej Wroński	−97 kg	Chkhaidze (GEO); L 0–2	Mambetov (TUR); W 7–1	—N/a	2	did not advance			13
Marek Sitnik	−130 kg	Vala (CZE); L 0–4	Bakir (TUR); L 0–1	Evseitchik (ISR); W 0–3	4	did not advance			17

== See also ==
- Poland at the 2000 Summer Paralympics

== Notes ==
- Wallechinsky, David (2004). The Complete Book of the Summer Olympics (Athens 2004 Edition). Toronto, Canada. ISBN 1-894963-32-6.
- International Olympic Committee (2001). The Results. Retrieved 12 November 2005.
- Sydney Organising Committee for the Olympic Games (2001). Official Report of the XXVII Olympiad Volume 1: Preparing for the Games. Retrieved 20 November 2005.
- Sydney Organising Committee for the Olympic Games (2001). Official Report of the XXVII Olympiad Volume 2: Celebrating the Games. Retrieved 20 November 2005.
- Sydney Organising Committee for the Olympic Games (2001). The Results. Retrieved 20 November 2005.
- International Olympic Committee Web Site
