= EuroBasket Women 1999 squads =

== Group A ==
=== Croatia ===
Croatia roster
Players
Coaches

Pos.	No.	Name	Age – Date of birth	Height	Club
	4	Sandra Mandir	–
	5	Slavica Pretreger	–
	6	Mirjana Tabak	–
	7	Amra Đapo	–
	8	Vedrana Grgin-Fonseca	–
	9	Tihana Abrlić	–
	10	Katarina Maloča	–
	11	Lidija Abrlić	–
	12	Mirna Deak	–
	13	Emilija Podrug	–
	14	Korana Longin-Zanze	–
	15	Sonja Kireta	–

Head coach

Legend

- (C) Team captain
- nat field describes country
  of last club
  before the tournament
- Age field is age on June 6, 1999

== Group B ==
=== Poland ===
- Dorota Bukowska
- Joanna Cupryś
- Patrycja Czepiec
- Katarzyna Dulnik
- Katarzyna Dydek
- Małgorzata Dydek
- Agnieszka Jaroszewicz
- Ilona Mądra
- Beata Predehl
- Krystyna Szymańska-Lara
- Elżbieta Trześniewska
- Sylwia Wlaźlak

Coach: Tomasz Herkt

=== Yugoslavia ===
Yugoslavia roster
Players
Coaches

Pos.	No.	Name	Age – Date of birth	Height	Club
	4	Gordana Bogojević	–
	5	Katarina Lazić	–
	6	Angela Đelmiš	–
	7	Lara Mandić	–
	8	Jelena Mirković	–
	9	Milenka Nedović	–
	10	Gordana Grubin	–
	11	Nina Bjedov	–
	12	Milka Bjelica	–
	13	Slobodanka Tuvić	–
	14	Daliborka Vilipić	–
	15	Violeta Vuković	–

Head coach

- Miodrag Vesković

Legend

- (C) Team captain
- nat field describes country
  of last club
  before the tournament
- Age field is age on June 6, 1999

=== Bosnia and Herzegovina ===
Bosnia and Herzegovina roster
Players
Coaches

Pos.	No.	Name	Age – Date of birth	Height	Club
	4	Melisa Hadžimustafić	–
	5	Tima Džebo	–
	6	Nura Imamović	–
	7	Amra Mehmedić	–
	8	Dženana Neimarlija	–
	9	Dragana Zorić	–
	10	Silvana Mirvić	–
	11	Vesna Bajkuša	–
	13	Meliha Cipurković	–
	14	Nidžara Munković	–
	15	Jadranka Savić	–

Head coach

Legend

- (C) Team captain
- nat field describes country
  of last club
  before the tournament
- Age field is age on June 6, 1999
