= 2006 FIBA World Championship for Women squads =

Basketball championship

The 2006 FIBA World Championship for Women held in Brazil had the following squads. The list includes the 12-women rosters of eight teams of the 16 participating countries, totaling 172 players.

== Group A ==
=== Argentina ===
Head coach: Eduardo Pinto

#	Pos	Name	Height(m)	Year born	Team
4	Guard	Laura Betiana Nicolli	1.76	1975	(Argentina) Union Florida
5	Forward/guard	Verónica Liliana Soberón	1.78	1977	(Argentina) Union Florida
6	Guard	Cecília Alejandra Peters Lineira	1.80	1986	(Argentina) Lanús
7	Guard	Natalia Romina Ríos	1.76	1980	(Italy) Lenzi Prof. Bolzano
8	Forward	Sandra Carolina Pavón	1.71	1985	(Argentina) Vélez Sársfield
9	Guard	Alejandra Ethel Chesta	1.86	1982	(Spain) C. B. Olesa
10	Forward/guard	Paula Erica Gatti	1.73	1978	(Argentina) Vélez Sársfield
11	Guard	Marcela Julia Paoletta	1.64	1979	(Argentina) Vélez Sársfield
12	Center	María Alejandra Fernández	1.86	1976	(Argentina) Vélez Sársfield
13	Center	María Gimena Landra	1.88	1983	(Argentina) Lanús
14	Center	Erica Carolina Sánchez	1.83	1976	(Portugal) Vagos
15	Center	Gisela Verónica Vega	1.88	1982	(Spain) Real Canoe

=== Brazil ===
Head coach: Antônio Carlos Barbosa

#	Pos	Name	Height(m)	Year born	Team
4	Guard	Adriana Moisés Pinto	1.70	1979	no club
5	Guard	Helen Cristina Santos Luz	1.76	1972	(Spain) Barcelona
6	Forward	Karen Gustavo Rocha	1.77	1984	(Brazil) Ourinhos
7	Forward	Micaela Martins Jacintho	1.80	1979	(Poland) MTK Polfa Pabiance
8	Forward/guard	Iziane Castro Marques	1.82	1982	(United States) Seattle Storm
9	Forward	Janeth dos Santos Arcain	1.82	1969	no club
10	Forward	Sílvia Cristina Gustavo Rocha	1.83	1982	(Brazil) Ponte Preta
11	Center	Soeli Garvão Zakrzeski	1.87	1977	(Brazil) São Caetano
12	Center	Érika Cristina de Souza	1.97	1982	(Spain) Ros Casares Valencia
13	Center	Alessandra Santos de Oliveira	2.01	1973	(South Korea) Woori Bank
14	Center	Cíntia Silva dos Santos	1.94	1975	(Italy) Famila Schio
15	Center	Kelly da Silva Santos	1.92	1979	(Brazil) Santo André

=== Senegal ===
Head coach: Maguette Diop

#	Pos	Name	Height(m)	Year born	Team
4	Guard	Fatou Dieng	1.67	1983	(France)
5	Guard	Nene Diame	1.70	1986	
6	Forward	Oumoul Khairy Sarr	1.88	1984	
7	Forward	Aya Traoré	1.83	1983	(Nigeria)
8	Forward	Mame Diodio Diouf	1.70	1984	(Ivory Coast)
9	Forward	Salimata Diatta	1.84	1981	(Romania) BC ICIM Arad
10	Forward	Astou Traoré	1.85	1981	(Belgium)
11	Center	Mariame Dia		1978	
12	Center	Awa Doumbia	1.82	1979	(Senegal) Jeanne d’Arc Dakar
13	Center	Ndèye Ndiaye	1.89	1979	(France)
14	Center	Astou Ndiaye-Diatta	1.89	1973	(Italy)
15	Center	Khady Yacine Ngom	1.79	1979	(Switzerland) Brunnen Basket

=== South Korea ===
Head coach: Soo Jong Yoo

#	Pos	Name	Height(m)	Year born	Team
4	Center	Kang Young-suk	1.87	1981	(South Korea) Shinham Bank
5	Guard	Choi Youn-ah	1.70	1985	no club
6	Forward	Kim Se-long	1.77	1986	(South Korea) Samsung Life
7	Forward	Kim Eun-hye	1.82	1982	(South Korea) Woori Bank
8	Guard	Lee Ktung-eun	1.76	1987	(South Korea) Woori Bank
9	Guard	Park Sun-young	1.75	1980	(South Korea) Shinham Bank
10	Forward	Beon Yeon-ha	1.80	1980	(South Korea) Samsung Life
11	Center	Sin Jung-ja	1.84	1980	(South Korea) BK Kookmin Bank
12	Center	Hong Hyun-hee	1.91	1982	(South Korea) Woori Bank
13	Forward	Kim Jung-eun	1.81	1987	(South Korea) Shinsegae
14	Center	Kim Kwe-ryong	1.90	1979	(South Korea) Woori Bank
15	Center	Kang Ji-sook	1.98	1979	(South Korea) Shinham Bank

=== Spain ===
Head coach: Domingo Díaz

#	Pos	Name	Height(m)	Year born	Team
4	Forward/center	María Pina	1.87	1987	(Spain) Adecco Estudiantes
5	Forward/guard	Marta Fernández	1.79	1981	(United States) Los Angeles Sparks
6	Forward/guard	Laia Palau	1.78	1979	(France) CJM Bourges Basket
7	Forward/guard	Isabel Sánchez	1.79	1976	(Spain) Acís León
8	Guard	Sílvia Domínguez	1.65	1987	(Spain) Barcelona
9	Center	Paula Seguí	1.88	1982	(Spain) Celta de Vigo
10	Guard	Elisa Aguilar	1.70	1976	(Spain) Ros Casares Valencia
11	Guard	Núria Martínez	1.75	1984	(Spain) Perfumerias Avenida Salamanca
12	Center	Anna Montañana	1.85	1980	(Spain) Ros Casares Valencia
13	Forward/center	Amaya Valdemoro	1.84	1976	(Russia) VBM-SGAU Samara
14	Center	Eva Montesdeoca	1.95	1981	(Spain) Gran Canaria
15	Center	Lucila Pascua	1.92	1983	(Spain) Acís León

== Group B ==
=== Australia ===
Head coach: Jan Stirling

#	Pos	Name	Height(m)	Year born	Team
4	Guard	Erin Phillips	1.73	1985	(United States) Connecticut Sun
5	Guard	Tully Bevilaqua	1.64	1972	(Australia) Canberra Capitals
6	Guard	Jennifer Screen	1.80	1982	(Australia) Adelaide Fellas
7	Forward	Penny Taylor	1.85	1981	(United States) Phoenix Mercury
8	Center	Emma Randall	1.88	1985	(Australia) Dandenong Rangers
9	Center	Hollie Grima	1.90	1983	(Australia) Bulleen Boomers
10	Guard	Kristi Harrower	1.63	1975	(France) Valenciennes
11	Center	Laura Summerton	1.88	1983	(Australia) AIS
12	Forward	Belinda Snell	1.80	1981	(United States) Phoenix Mercury
13	Center	Jenny Whittle (Capt)	1.97	1973	(Australia) Canberra Capitals
14	Forward	Emily McInerny	1.84	1978	(Australia) Dandenong Rangers
15	Forward/center	Lauren Jackson	1.95	1981	(United States) Seattle Storm

=== Canada ===
Head coach: Allison McNeill

#	Pos	Name	Height(m)	Year born	Team
4	Guard	Sheila Mae Townsend	1.76	1980	(Germany) BG Dorsten
5	Guard	Teresa Gabriele	1.65	1979	
6	Forward	Kelsey Alexa Adrian	1.86	1989	(Canada) Brookswood Secondary School
7	Forward	Isabelle Grenier	1.80	1978	(Germany) BG Dorsten
8	Guard/forward	Kim Gaucher	1.85	1984	(United States) Sacramento Monarchs
9	Forward	Sarah Jane Crooks	1.85	1984	(Canada) University of Saskatchewan
10	Guard	Carrie Michelle Watson	1.78	1981	
11	Center	Amanda Claire Brown	1.95	1984	(United States) Pennsylvania State University
12	Forward	Claudia Melati Brassard-Riebesehl	1.82	1975	(Australia) Townsville Fire
13	Forward	Nicole Anne Johnson	1.80	1975	(Germany) BG Dorsten
14	Forward	Chelsea Aubry	1.88	1984	(United States) University of Nebraska-Lincoln
15	Center	Tamara Kim Sutton-Brown	1.93	1978	(Turkey) Fenerbahçe

== Group C ==
=== (United States) USA ===
Head coach: Anne Donovan

#	Pos	Name	Height(m)	Year born	Team
4	Guard	Alana Beard	1.81	1982	(United States) Washington Mystics (Australia) Canberra Capitals
5	Forward	Seimone Augustus	1.86	1984	(United States) Minnesota Lynx
6	Guard	Sue Bird	1.76	1980	(United States) Seattle Storm (Russia) Dynamo Moscow
7	Forward	Sheryl Swoopes	1.83	1971	(United States) Houston Comets (Italy) Taranto Cras Basket
8	Forward	DeLisha Milton-Jones	1.85	1974	(United States) Washington Mystics (Czech Republic) BK Brno
9	Center	Cheryl Ford	1.91	1981	(United States) Detroit Shock
10	Forward	Tamika Catchings	1.83	1979	(United States) Indiana Fever
11	Forward	Tina Thompson	1.89	1975	(United States) Houston Comets
12	Guard/forward	Diana Taurasi	1.83	1982	(United States) Phoenix Mercury (Russia) Dynamo Moscow
13	Center	Michelle Snow	1.96	1980	(United States) Houston Comets (Italy) ASD Basket Parma
14	Guard	Katie Smith	1.81	1974	(United States) Detroit Shock
15	Forward/center	Candace Parker	1.93	1986	(United States) University of Tennessee

== Group D ==
=== France ===
Head coach: Alain Jardel

#	Pos	Name	Height(m)	Year born	Team
4	Guard	Clémence Beikes	1.78	1983	(France) Tarbes GB
5	Forward	Sandra Le Dréan	1.87	1977	(Czech Republic) USK Prague
6	Guard	Céline Dumerc	1.69	1982	(France) CJM Bourges Basket
7	Center	Sandrine Gruda	1.92	1987	(France) Valenciennes
8	Forward	Emmanuelle Hermouet	1.83	1979	(France) Valenciennes
9	Guard	Audrey Sauret-Gillespie (cap.)	1.78	1976	(Russia) UMMC Ekaterinburg
10	Center	Nathalie Lesdema	1.90	1973	(Spain) Acís León
11	Guard	Émilie Gomis	1.80	1983	(France) Valenciennes (United States) New York Liberty
12	Forward	Krissy Badé	1.82	1980	(France) Valenciennes
13	Center	Sandra Dijon	1.95	1976	(France) Lattes-Montpellier
14	Center	Emmeline NDongué	1.94	1983	(France) CJM Bourges Basket (United States) Los Angeles Sparks
15	Center	Élodie Godin	1.90	1985	(France) Valenciennes
