= Rowing at the 2000 Summer Olympics – Men's quadruple sculls =

Men's quadruple sculls at the Games of the XXVII Olympiad
- Venue: Sydney International Regatta Centre
- Date: 17–23 September 2000
- Competitors: 52 from 13 nations
- Winning time: 5:45.56

Medalists
1st place, gold medalist(s)		Agostino Abbagnale; Alessio Sartori; Rossano Galtarossa; Simone Raineri	Italy
2nd place, silver medalist(s)		Jochem Verberne; Dirk Lippits; Diederik Simon; Michiel Bartman	Netherlands
3rd place, bronze medalist(s)		Marco Geisler; Andreas Hajek; Stephan Volkert; André Willms	Germany

The men's quadruple sculls competition at the 2000 Summer Olympics in Sydney, Australia took place at the Sydney International Regatta Centre.

== Competition format ==
This rowing event is a quadruple scull event, meaning that each boat is propelled by four rowers. The "scull" portion means that each rower uses two oars, one on each side of the boat; this contrasts with sweep rowing in which each rower has one oar and rows on only one side. The competition consisted of multiple rounds. Finals were held to determine the placing of each boat; these finals were given letters with those nearer to the beginning of the alphabet meaning a better ranking. Semifinals were named based on which finals they fed, with each semifinal having two possible finals.

With 13 boats in heats, the best boats qualify directly for the semi-finals. All other boats progress to the repechage round, which offers a second chance to qualify for the semi-finals. Unsuccessful boats from the repechage are eliminated from the competition. The best three boats in each of the two semi-finals qualify for final A, which determines places 1–6 (including the medals). Unsuccessful boats from semi-finals A/B go forward to final B, which determines places 7–12.

== Schedule ==
All times are Australian Time (UTC+10)

Date	Time	Round
Monday, 18 September 2000	10:30	Heats
Wednesday, 20 September 2000	10:10	Repechages
Friday, 22 September 2000	09:30	Semifinals
Saturday, 23 September 2000	11:50	Final B
Sunday, 24 September 2000	09:50	Final

== Results ==
=== Heats ===
The winner of each heat advanced to the semifinals, remainder goes to the repechage.

==== Heat 1 ====
Rank	Rower	Country	Time	Notes
1	Marco Geisler, Andreas Hajek, Stephan Volkert, André Willms	Germany	5:51.60	Q
2	Jochem Verberne, Dirk Lippits, Diederik Simon, Michiel Bartman	Netherlands	5:54.57	Q
3	Karol Łazar, Sławomir Kruszkowski, Adam Bronikowski, Michał Wojciechowski	Poland	5:58.09	Q
4	Leonides Samé, Eusebio Acea, Yoennis Hernández, Yosbel Martínez	Cuba	6:00.67	R
5	Liu Jian, Liang Hongming, Hua Lingjun, Li Yang	China	6:16.48	R

==== Heat 2 ====
Rank	Rower	Country	Time	Notes
1	Peter Hardcastle, Jason Day, Stuart Reside, Duncan Free	Australia	5:52.09	Q
2	Oleksandr Marchenko, Oleh Lykov, Oleksandr Zaskalko, Leonid Shaposhnykov	Ukraine	5:53.03	Q
3	Yvan Deslavière, Guillaume Jeannet, Sébastien Vieilledent, Samuel Barathay	France	5:54.85	Q
4	Raphael Hartl, Horst Nußbaumer, Arnold Jonke, Norbert Lambing	Austria	5:59.41	R

==== Heat 3 ====
Rank	Rower	Country	Time	Notes
1	Agostino Abbagnale, Alessio Sartori, Rossano Galtarossa, Simone Raineri	Italy	5:45.67	Q
2	Simon Stürm, Christian Stofer, Michael Erdlen, André Vonarburg	Switzerland	5:49.11	Q
3	Sean Hall, Ian McGowan, Nick Peterson, Jake Wetzel	United States	5:50.29	Q
4	Stijn Smulders, Arnaud Duchesne, luc Goiris, Björn Hendrickx	Belgium	5:56.79	R

=== Repechage ===
First three qualify to semifinals.

==== Repechage 1 ====
Rank	Rower	Country	Time	Notes
1	Leonides Samé, Eusebio Acea, Yoennis Hernández, Yosbel Martínez	Cuba	6:04.45	Q
2	Raphael Hartl, Horst Nußbaumer, Arnold Jonke, Norbert Lambing	Austria	6:05.65	Q
3	Stijn Smulders, Arnaud Duchesne, luc Goiris, Björn Hendrickx	Belgium	6:10.11	Q
4	Liu Jian, Liang Hongming, Hua Lingjun, Li Yang	China	6:16.80	

=== Semifinals ===
First three places advance to Final A, the remainder to Final B.

==== Semifinal 1 ====
Rank	Rower	Country	Time	Notes
1	Marco Geisler, Andreas Hajek, Stephan Volkert, André Willms	Germany	5:48.92	A
2	Peter Hardcastle, Jason Day, Stuart Reside, Duncan Free	Australia	5:50.26	A
3	Simon Stürm, Christian Stofer, Michael Erdlen, André Vonarburg	Switzerland	5:53.07	A
4	Yvan Deslavière, Guillaume Jeannet, Sébastien Vieilledent, Samuel Barathay	France	5:54.68	B
5	Stijn Smulders, Arnaud Duchesne, luc Goiris, Björn Hendrickx	Belgium	5:56.36	B
6	Karol Łazar, Sławomir Kruszkowski, Adam Bronikowski, Michał Wojciechowski	Poland	6:02.11	B

==== Semifinal 2 ====
Rank	Rower	Country	Time	Notes
1	Agostino Abbagnale, Alessio Sartori, Rossano Galtarossa, Simone Raineri	Italy	5:44.08	A
2	Jochem Verberne, Dirk Lippits, Diederik Simon, Michiel Bartman	Netherlands	5:47.80	A
3	Oleksandr Marchenko, Oleh Lykov, Oleksandr Zaskalko, Leonid Shaposhnykov	Ukraine	5:48.15	A
4	Sean Hall, Ian McGowan, Nick Peterson, Jake Wetzel	United States	5:49.89	B
5	Raphael Hartl, Horst Nußbaumer, Arnold Jonke, Norbert Lambing	Austria	6:00.27	B
6	Leonides Samé, Eusebio Acea, Yoennis Hernández, Yosbel Martínez	Cuba	6:01.39	B

=== Finals ===
==== Final B ====
Rank	Rower	Country	Time	Notes
1	Sean Hall, Ian McGowan, Nick Peterson, Jake Wetzel	United States	5:49.76	
2	Karol Łazar, Sławomir Kruszkowski, Adam Bronikowski, Michał Wojciechowski	Poland	5:51.79	
3	Stijn Smulders, Arnaud Duchesne, luc Goiris, Björn Hendrickx	Belgium	5:54.17	
4	Yvan Deslavière, Guillaume Jeannet, Sébastien Vieilledent, Samuel Barathay	France	5:55.41	
5	Raphael Hartl, Horst Nußbaumer, Arnold Jonke, Norbert Lambing	Austria	5:57.58	
6	Leonides Samé, Eusebio Acea, Yoennis Hernández, Yosbel Martínez	Cuba	6:00.63	

==== Final A ====
Rank	Rower	Country	Time	Notes
1st place, gold medalist(s)	Agostino Abbagnale, Alessio Sartori, Rossano Galtarossa, Simone Raineri	Italy	5:45.56	
2nd place, silver medalist(s)	Jochem Verberne, Dirk Lippits, Diederik Simon, Michiel Bartman	Netherlands	5:47.91	
3rd place, bronze medalist(s)	Marco Geisler, Andreas Hajek, Stephan Volkert, André Willms	Germany	5:48.64	
4	Peter Hardcastle, Jason Day, Stuart Reside, Duncan Free	Australia	5:50.32	
5	Simon Stürm, Christian Stofer, Michael Erdlen, André Vonarburg	Switzerland	5:54.88	
6	Oleksandr Marchenko, Oleh Lykov, Oleksandr Zaskalko, Leonid Shaposhnykov	Ukraine	5:55.12	
