= EuroBasket Women 2001 squads =

== Group A ==
=== Yugoslavia ===
Yugoslavia roster
Players
Coaches

Pos.	No.	Name	Age – Date of birth	Height	Club
	4	Ana Joković	–
	5	Angela Đelmiš	–
	6	Dragoslava Žakula	–
	7	Lara Mandić	–
	8	Monika Veselovski	–
	9	Biljana Stanković	–
	10	Hajdana Radunović	–
	11	Milka Bjelica	–
	12	Ljubica Drljača	–
	13	Slobodanka Tuvić	–
	14	Nataša Anđelić	–
	15	Violeta Vuković	–

Head coach

- Miroslav Popov

Legend

- (C) Team captain
- nat field describes country
  of last club
  before the tournament
- Age field is age on June 7, 2001
