= Dydek =

Dydek is a surname. Notable people with the surname include:

- Katarzyna Dydek (born 1970), Polish basketball player
- Margo Dydek (1974–2011), Polish basketball player
- Marta Dydek (born 1982), Polish basketball player, sister of Katarzyna and Margo
