= Badé =

Badé may refer to:

- Crow term for Two-spirit
- Krissy Badé (born 1980), French basketball coach and former player
- Loïc Badé (born 2000), French footballer
