= Melvyn Govindy =

French basketball player

Free Agent
- Position: Center

Personal information
- Born: 6 November 1997 (age 29) Pau, France
- Listed height: 2.12 m (6 ft 11 in)
- Listed weight: 109 kg (240 lb)

Career information
- Playing career: 2016–present

Career history
- 2016: SLUC Nancy
- 2017–2020: Cholet

Melvyn Govindy (born 6 November 1997) is a French professional basketball player, who lastly played for Cholet Basket of the LNB Pro A.

== Professional career ==
Govindy played in the youth teams of Cholet Basket, starting from 2012. In the 2016–17 season, he played for the youth team of SLUC Nancy Basket, as well as in the French top tier LNB Pro A. For the 2017–18 season, Govindy returned to Cholet to play in its senior team which competed in the Pro A. In April 2018, he declared for the 2018 NBA draft.

== Personal ==
Govindy is the son of Stephane Govindy former basketball player and former professional player Sandra Dijon.
