= Sujin =

Sujin may be:

== Places ==
Nellikkunnam, Kottarakkara Kollam Kerala, India

== People ==
- Emperor Sujin of Japan, traditionally said to have reigned in the 1st century B.C.
- Soo-jin, Korean given name
- Sujin (สุจินต์), Thai unisex given name
  - Sujin Boriharnwanaket (born 1927), Thai female Buddhist writer
  - Sujin Naknayom (born 1979), Thai male footballer

== Other ==
- An old name for the Nivaclé language of South America
