= McNichol =

McNichol is a surname. Notable people with the surname include:

- Brendon McNichol (born 1966), American musician
- Brian McNichol (born 1974), American baseball player
- Doug McNichol (1930–2012), Canadian football player
- Duncan McNichol (1874–1949), Scottish footballer
- Edward McNichol (1895–1930), American basketball coach
- Jim McNichol (born 1958), Scottish footballer
- Jimmy McNichol (born 1961), American actor
- Johnny McNichol (1925–2007), Scottish footballer
- Joy McNichol (born 1974), Canadian basketball player
- Kris McNichol, Canadian politician
- Kristy McNichol (born 1962), American actress
- Les McNichol (1932–2013), New Zealand rugby league player
