= Gruppi Sportivi Fiamme Gialle =

Sports department of the Guardia di Finanza

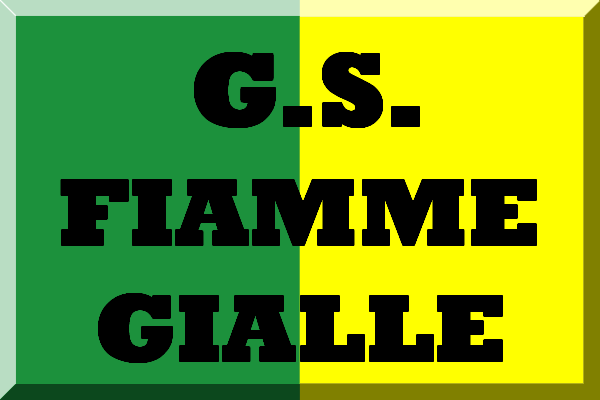
- Sport: 12 disciplines
- Jurisdiction: Italy
- Abbreviation: G.S. Fiamme Gialle
- Founded: 1881
- Affiliation: CONI
- Headquarters: Ostia (Rome)

Official website
- www.fiammegialle.org

The Gruppi Sportivi Fiamme Gialle is the sport department of the Italian financial police force Guardia di Finanza.

The club's activity is carried out in the following twelve sport disciplines: athletics, swimming, judo, karate, shooting, fencing, diving, canoeing, rowing, sailing, alpine skiing, and speed skating. In athletics, the group is called Gruppo Atletico Fiamme Gialle (G.A. Fiamme Gialle).

== History ==
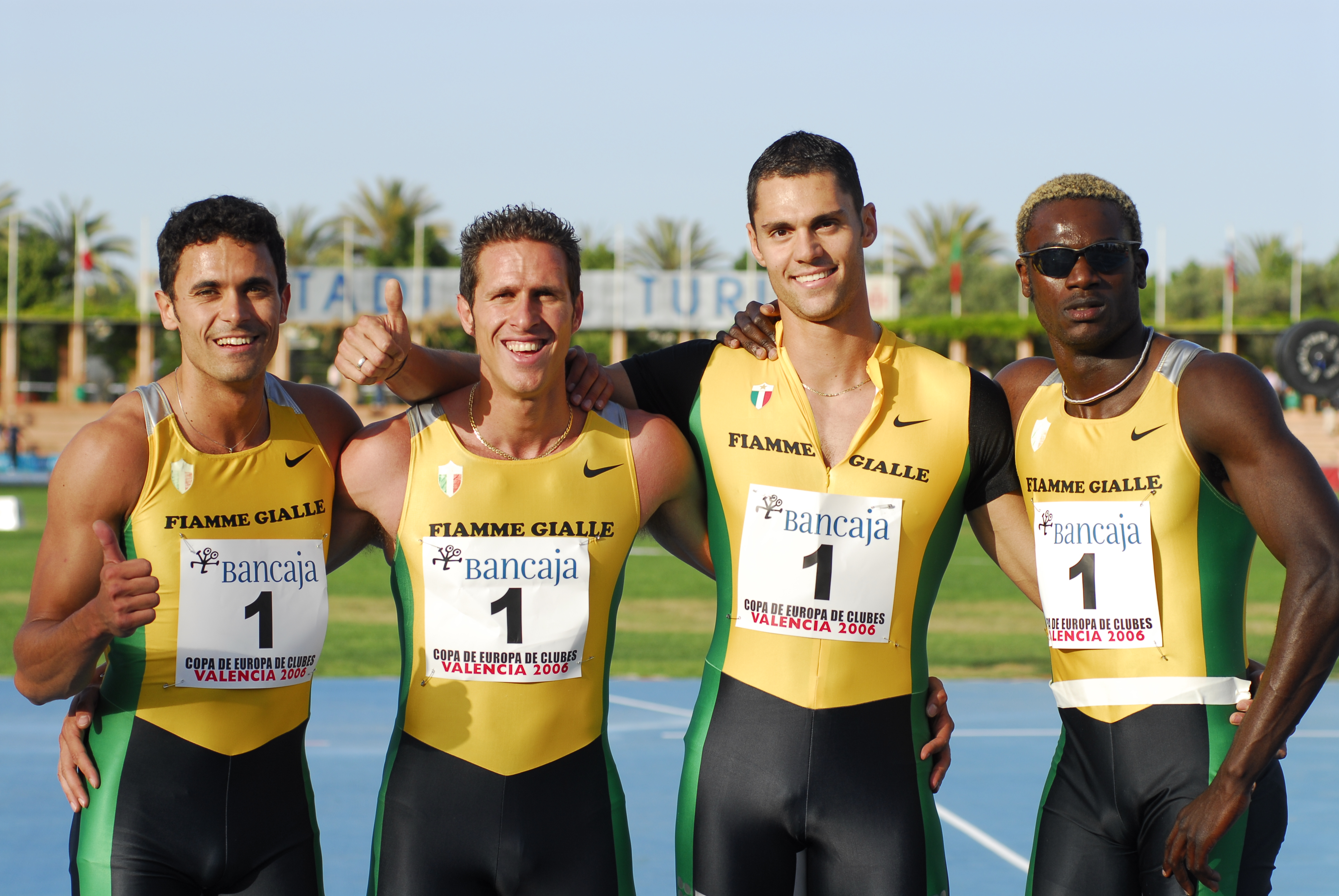
A team of the 4 × 100 metres relay

The first appearance of the Guardia di Finanza in sporting events date back to 1911. The team participated the gymnastics event organized in Turin, for the 50th anniversary of the Unification of Italy. However, the Scudo Nelli Trophy's first organized team, the Fiamme Gialle (Yellow Flames), was founded in 1921 to compete in a walking race. The trophy was eventually given out following three victories in 1922, 1925, and 1928.

In the following years, the activity was expanded with the establishment of several sports groups, the first of which was the Skiers Group, founded in 1925 at the Alpine School of the Guardia di Finanza in Predazzo (in the province of Trento), a group that became famous as the Yellow Flames of Predazzo.

== Greatest athletes ==
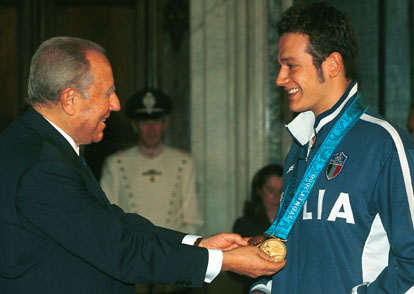
The swimmer Domenico Fioravanti, two gold medals at Sydney 2000.

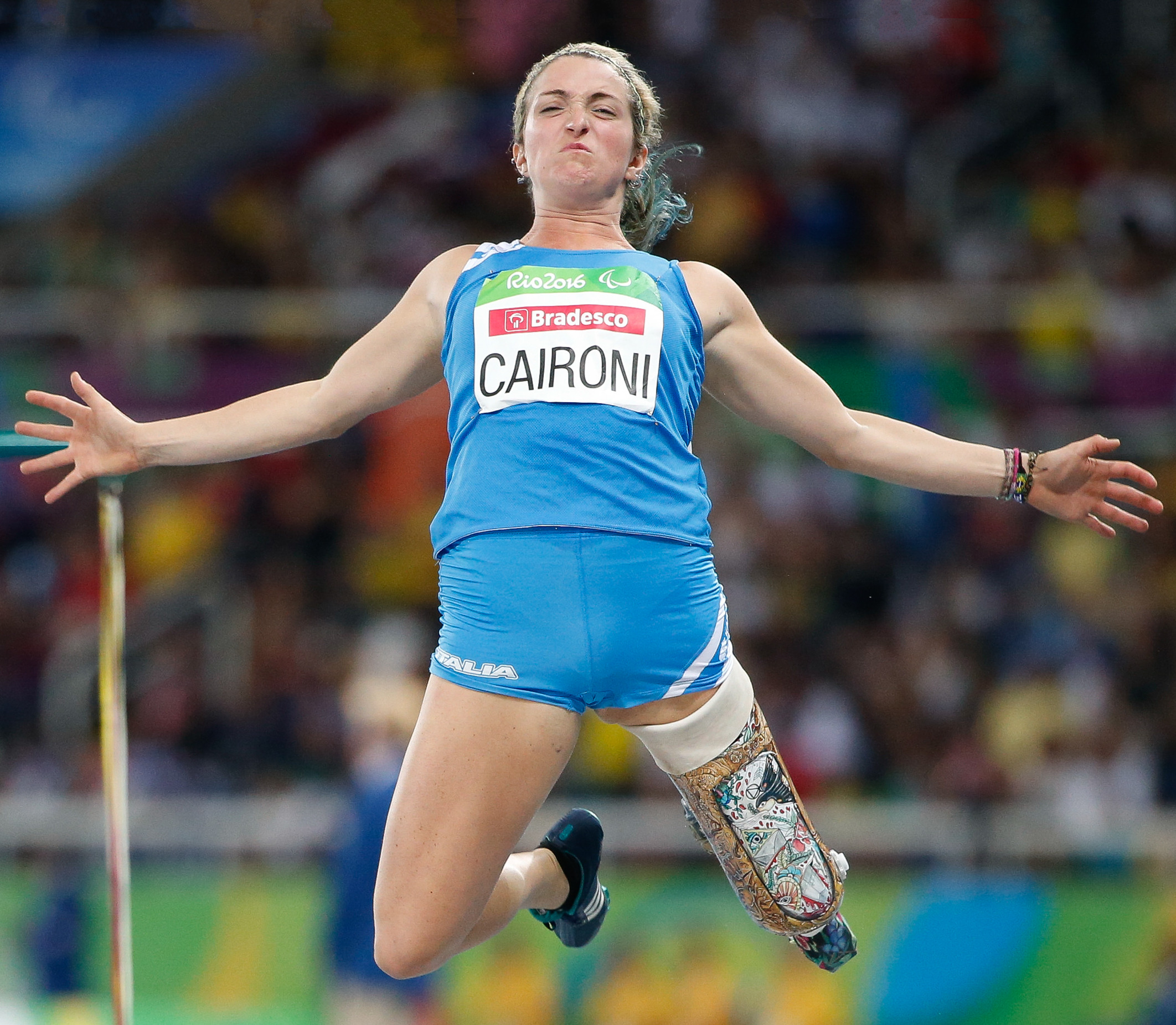
Martina Caironi, two gold medals at Rio 2016 Paralympic Games.

Summer sports	Winter sports	Paralympic sports
Athletics: Ivano Brugnetti (Olympic gold medal); Nicola Vizzoni (Olympic silver medal); Fabrizio Donato (Olympic bronze medal); Giuseppe Gibilisco (Olympic bronze medal); Antonietta Di Martino (WC three medals); Antonella Palmisano (WC bronze medal); Filippo Tortu (Olympic gold medal); Fausto Desalu (Olympic gold medal); Lorenzo Patta (Olympic gold medal); Canoeing: Antonio Rossi (Olympic gold medal); Beniamino Bonomi (Olympic gold medal); Diving: Tania Cagnotto (two Olympic medals); Rowing: Agostino Abbagnale (three Olympic gold medals); Shooting: Niccolò Campriani (three Olympic gold medals); Roberto Di Donna (Olympic gold medal); Swimming: Domenico Fioravanti (two Olympic gold medals)	Alpine skiing: Gustav Thöni (four overall World Cup); Piero Gros (one overall World Cup); Sofia Goggia (Olympic gold medal); Isolde Kostner (three Olympic Games medals); Kristian Ghedina (three WC medals); Cross-country skiing: Giorgio Vanzetta (Olympic gold medal); Cristian Zorzi (Olympic gold medal); Short-track speed skating: Pietro Sighel (Olympic gold medal); Biathlon: Dorothea Wierer (two overall World Cup & WC three gold medals)	Para-athletics: Martina Caironi (two Olympic gold medals); Antonio Fantin (Olympic gold medal); Oxana Corso (two Olympic silver medals)

== Summer Olympic Games medal table ==
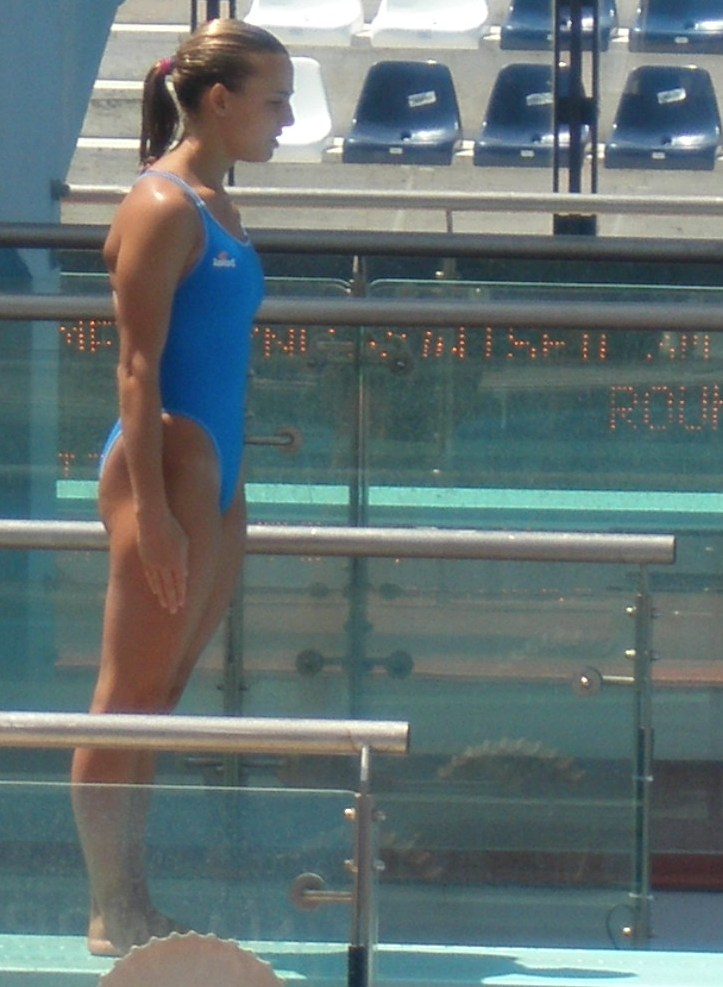
Tania Cagnotto, two medals in diving at Rio de Janeiro 2016.

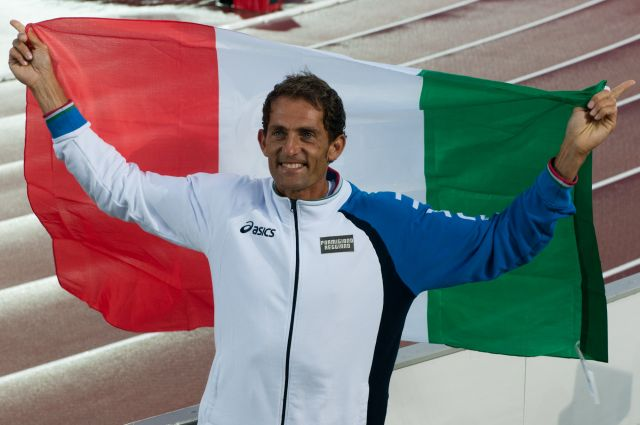
Fabrizio Donato, the last Fiamme Gialle athletics Olympic medal in London 2012.

In total, the athletes of the Fiamme Gialle won 42 medals at the Summer Olympics.

Women medalist

Edition	Athlete	Event	Medal
Athletics (8 medals)
2020 Tokyo	Lorenzo Patta; Fausto Desalu; Filippo Tortu	4 × 100 m relay	Gold
2012 London	Fabrizio Donato	Triple jump	Bronze
2008 Beijing	Elisa Rigaudo	20 km walk	Bronze
2004 Athens	Ivano Brugnetti	20 km walk	Gold
2004 Athens	Giuseppe Gibilisco	Pole vault	Bronze
2000 Sydney	Nicola Vizzoni	Hammer throw	Silver
1984 Los Angeles	Sandro Bellucci	50 km walk	Bronze
1948 London	Michele Tito	4 × 100 m relay	Bronze
Canoeing (8 medals)
2008 Beijing	Andrea Facchin; Antonio Scaduto	K2 1000 m	Bronze
2004 Athens	Antonio Rossi; Beniamino Bonomi	K2 1000 m	Silver
2000 Sydney	Antonio Rossi; Beniamino Bonomi	K2 1000 m	Gold
1996 Atlanta	Antonio Rossi	K1 500 m	Gold
1996 Atlanta	Antonio Rossi	K2 1000 m	Gold
1996 Atlanta	Beniamino Bonomi	K1 1000 m	Silver
1996 Atlanta	Beniamino Bonomi	K2 500 m	Silver
1992 Barcelona	Antonio Rossi; Bruno Dreossi	K2 500 m	Bronze
Rowing (8 medals)
2016 Rio de Janeiro	Domenico Montrone; Matteo Lodo; Giuseppe Vicino	Coxless four	Bronze
2012 London	Alessio Sartori; Romano Battisti	Double sculls	Silver
2008 Beijing	Luca Agamennoni; Simone Venier; Simone Raineri	Quadruple sculls	Silver
2004 Athens	Alessio Sartori	Double sculls	Bronze
2004 Athens	Luca Agamennoni	Coxless four	Bronze
2004 Athens	Catello Amarante	Coxless four lightweight	Bronze
2000 Sydney	Agostino Abbagnale; Alessio Sartori; Simone Raineri	Quadruple sculls	Gold
1996 Atlanta	Agostino Abbagnale	Double sculls	Gold
Fencing (3 medals)
2016 Rio de Janeiro	Daniele Garozzo	Foil	Gold
2012 London	Valerio Aspromonte; Giorgio Avola	Team foil	Gold
2012 London	Luigi Samele	Team sabre	Bronze
Judo (5 medals)
2008 Beijing	Giulia Quintavalle	57 kg	Gold
2004 Athens	Lucia Morico	78 kg	Bronze
2000 Sydney	Girolamo Giovinazzo	66 kg	Bronze
1996 Atlanta	Girolamo Giovinazzo	60 kg	Silver
1976 Montreal	Felice Mariani	66 kg	Bronze
Shooting (6 medals)
2012 London	Niccolò Campriani	50 m rifle three positions	Gold
2012 London	Niccolò Campriani	10 m air rifle	Silver
2016 Rio de Janeiro	Niccolò Campriani	50 m rifle three positions	Gold
2016 Rio de Janeiro	Niccolò Campriani	10 m air rifle	Gold
1996 Atlanta	Roberto Di Donna	10 m air pistol	Gold
1996 Atlanta	Roberto Di Donna	25 m rapid fire pistol	Bronze
Swimming (2 medals)
2000 Sydney	Domenico Fioravanti	100 m breaststroke	Gold
2000 Sydney	Domenico Fioravanti	200 m breaststroke	Gold
Diving (2 medals)
2016 Rio de Janeiro	Tania Cagnotto	Synchronized 3 m springboard	Silver
2016 Rio de Janeiro	Tania Cagnotto	3 m springboard	Bronze

== Winter Olympic Games medal table ==
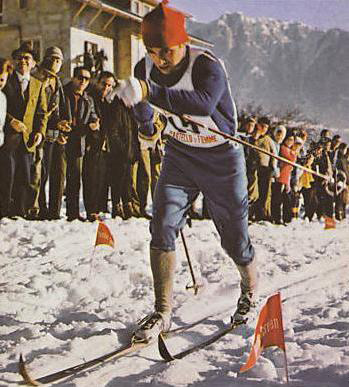
Franco Nones, the first historical gold medal of Fiamme Gialle in cross-country skiing at Grenoble 1968.

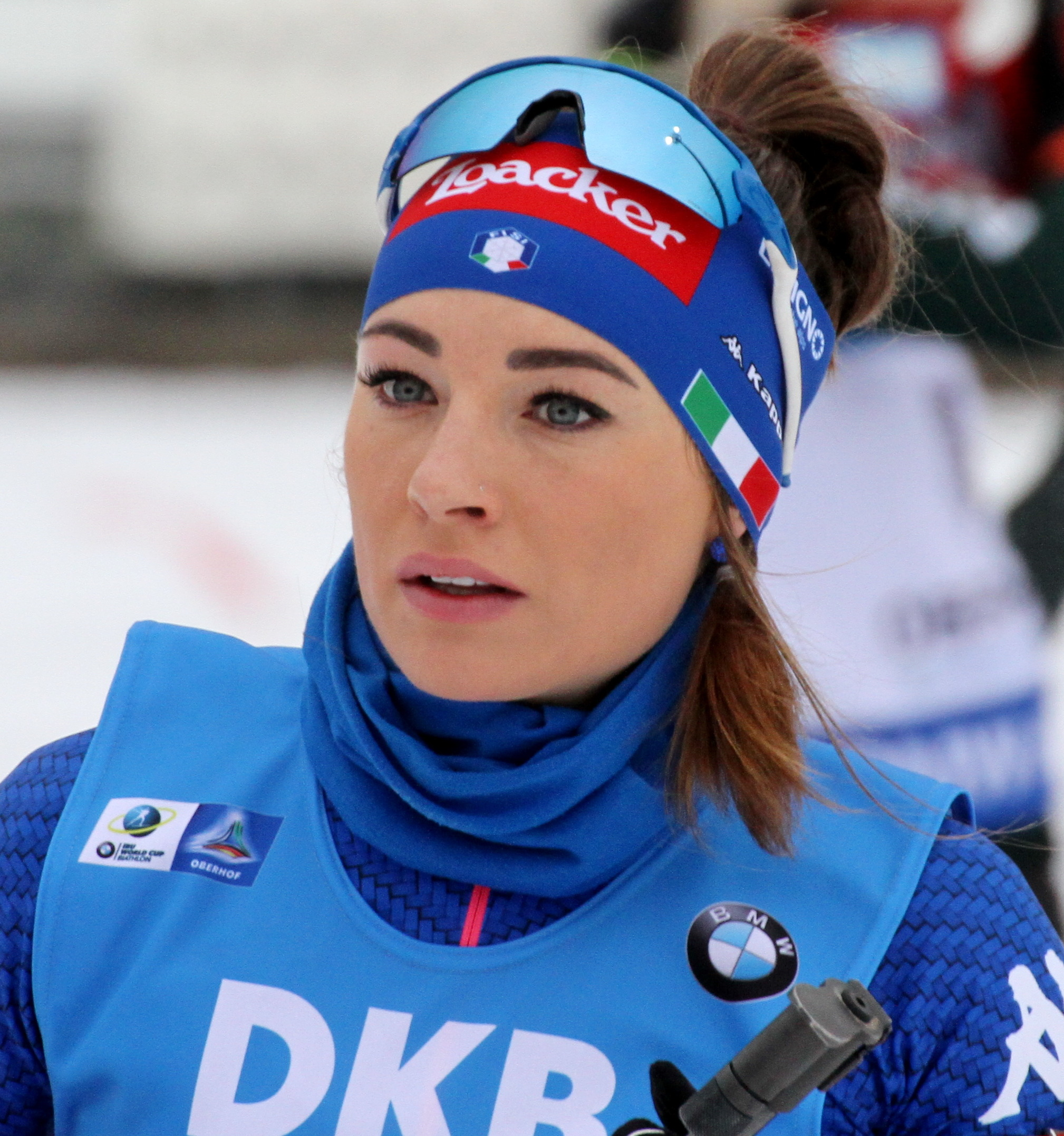
Dorothea Wierer, two medals in biathlon at Pyeongchang 2018.

In total, the athletes of the Fiamme Gialle won 22 (7 gold, 6 silver, and 9 bronze), at the Winter Olympics.

Women medalist

Edition	Athlete	Event	Medal
1968 Grenoble	Franco Nones	Cross-country skiing - 30 km	Gold
1972 Sapporo	Gustav Thoeni	Alpine skiing - Giant slalom	Gold
1972 Sapporo	Gustav Thoeni	Alpine skiing - Slalom	Silver
1972 Sapporo	Rolando Thoeni	Alpine skiing - Slalom	Bronze
1976 Innsbruck	Piero Gros	Alpine skiing - Slalom	Gold
1976 Innsbruck	Gustav Thoeni	Alpine skiing - Slalom	Silver
1988 Calgary	Gottlieb Taschler	Biathlon – Relay	Bronze
1992 Albertville	Josef Polig	Alpine skiing - Alpine combined	Gold
1992 Albertville	Giorgio Vanzetta	Cross-country skiing - 4 × 10 km relay	Silver
1992 Albertville	Giuseppe Puliè	Cross-country skiing - 4 × 10 km relay	Silver
1992 Albertville	Giorgio Vanzetta	Cross-country skiing - 15 km freestyle pursuit	Bronze
1992 Albertville	Giorgio Vanzetta	Cross-country skiing - 50 km freestyle	Bronze
1994 Lillehammer	Giorgio Vanzetta	Cross-country skiing - 4 × 10 km relay	Gold
2002 Salt Lake City	Isolde Kostner	Alpine skiing- Downhill	Silver
2002 Salt Lake City	Cristian Zorzi	Cross-country skiing – Men's 4 × 10 km relay	Silver
2002 Salt Lake City	Cristian Zorzi	Cross-country skiing - Sprint	Bronze
2006 Torino	Cristian Zorzi	Cross-country skiing – Men's 4 × 10 km relay	Gold
2010 Vancouver	Alessandro Pittin	Nordic combined - Normal hill/10 km	Bronze
2014 Sochi	Christof Innerhofer	Alpine skiing- Downhill	Silver
2014 Sochi	Christof Innerhofer	Alpine skiing - Alpine combined	Bronze
2014 Sochi	Dorothea Wierer	Biathlon – Mixed relay	Bronze
2018 Pyeongchang	Sofia Goggia	Alpine skiing - Downhill	Gold
2018 Pyeongchang	Dorothea Wierer	Biathlon – Mixed relay	Bronze
2022 Beijing	Dorothea Wierer	Biathlon - Sprint	Bronze

== Medal table by sport ==
=== Canoeing ===
Canoesist of Fiamme Gialle have won a total of eight medals at the Olympic Games.

Event	Gold medal	Silver medal	Bronze medal	Tot.
Olympic Games	3	3	2	8
World Championships	4	8	3	15
Junior World Championships	1	1	0	2
Mediterranean Games	7	6	6	19
European Championships	6	3	4	13
Under 23 European Championships	0	0	1	1
Junior European Championships	4	2	1	7
Military World Games	1	1	3	5
Universiade	0	1	1	2

== See also ==
- Guardia di Finanza
- Italian military sports bodies
- European Champion Clubs Cup (athletics)
