= Sojin =

Sojin may refer to:

- Sojin (Shinto), an ancestral deity
- Park So-jin, a South Korean singer and actress
- Sōjin Kamiyama, a Japanese actor

== See also ==
- Sōchin, a kata in karate
- Soo-jin
