= Li Yang (rower) =

Chinese rower

Personal information
- Nationality: Chinese
- Born: 28 February 1978 (age 48)

Sport
- Sport: Rowing

Li Yang (born 28 February 1978) is a Chinese rower. He competed in the men's quadruple sculls event at the 2000 Summer Olympics.
