= Rossano Galtarossa =

Italian rower (born 1972)

Personal information
- Nationality: Italian
- Born: 6 July 1972 (age 53) Padua, Italy
Medal record
Men's rowing
Representing Italy
Olympic Games
Gold medal – first place	2000 Sydney	Quadruple sculls
Silver medal – second place	2008 Beijing	Quadruple sculls
Bronze medal – third place	1992 Barcelona	Quadruple sculls
Bronze medal – third place	2004 Athens	Double Sculls
World Championships
Gold medal – first place	1994 Indianapolis	Quadruple Sculls
Gold medal – first place	1995 Tampere	Quadruple Sculls
Gold medal – first place	1997 Aiguebelette	Quadruple Sculls
Gold medal – first place	1998 Cologne	Quadruple Sculls
Silver medal – second place	2003 Milan	Double Sculls
Bronze medal – third place	1993 Račice	Quadruple Sculls
Bronze medal – third place	2001 Lucerne	Double Sculls
Bronze medal – third place	2002 Seville	Quadruple Sculls

Rossano Galtarossa (born 6 July 1972 in Padua) is an Italian competition rower and Olympic champion.

He received a gold medal in quadruple sculls at the 2000 Summer Olympics in Sydney, together with Agostino Abbagnale, Simone Raineri, and Alessio Sartori.

He received a silver medal in quadruple sculls at the 2008 Summer Olympics in Beijing.

He received a bronze medal in quadruple sculls at the 1992 Summer Olympics in Barcelona and in double sculls at the 2004 Summer Olympics in Athens, with Alessio Sartori.
