= Marta Dydek =

Polish professional basketball player

Personal information
- Born: 11 March 1982 (age 44) Wołomin, Poland
- Listed height: 6 ft 5 in (1.96 m)

Career information
- College: Texas at El Paso (2003–2005)
- Playing career: 2005–2011
- Position: Center

Career history
- 2005–2006: USP-CEU Adecco Estudiantes
- 2006–2007: Mann-Filter Zaragoza
- 2007: Alvargomez
- 2008: Irlandesas
- 2008: Alumisan Pio XII
- 2009: Valls Vane-Lafarge
- 2009–2010: Logan Thunder
- 2010–2011: Femenino Caceres
- 2011: Real Canoe NC

Marta Krystyna Dydek (born 11 March 1982) is a Polish former professional basketball player.

== Career ==
=== College ===
From 2003–2005, Dydek played her college career at University of Texas at El Paso in El Paso, Texas for the UTEP Miners.

=== Spain ===
After college, Dydek began her professional career in Spain's Liga Femenina de Baloncesto, with USP-CEU Adecco Estudiantes. After moving to Mann-Filter Zaragoza for the following season, she would then move down to Liga Femenina 2 de Baloncesto. Over two seasons, she played across four teams. After a season away in Australia, Dydek returned for the 2010–11 season.

=== Australia ===
In 2009, Dydek was signed by the Logan Thunder in the Women's National Basketball League. Dydek's older sister, Margo, lived and coached in Brisbane, Australia and was instrumental in her signing. Dydek was not re-signed for the 2010–11 season.

== National team ==
Born and raised in Poland, Dydek would follow in the footsteps of her older sisters and represent the Poland national team. She made her debut at the 1997 FIBA Europe Under-16 Championship. Three years later, she would play at the 2000 FIBA Europe Under-18 Championship in Poland, where as the host nation, they would win the bronze medal. At the 2001 FIBA Under-19 World Championship in the Czech Republic, Poland would place 10th.

== Personal life ==
Dydek was the youngest of three girls, all of whom were professional basketball players and represented the Polish national team. Her two older sisters were, Katarzyna and Małgorzata. The younger of the two, Margo, was the 1st pick overall in the 1998 WNBA draft.
