= Norbert Lambing =

Austrian rower

Personal information
- Nationality: Austrian
- Born: 12 October 1976 (age 50) Vienna, Austria

Sport
- Sport: Rowing

Norbert Lambing (born 12 October 1976) is an Austrian rower. He competed in the men's quadruple sculls event at the 2000 Summer Olympics.
