= Jochem Verberne =

Dutch rower

Medal record

Men's rowing

Representing Netherlands

Olympic Games
Silver medal – second place	2000 Sydney	Quadruple sculls

Joachim Hermanus Jacobus Verberne (born 19 January 1978 in Alkmaar, North Holland) is a former rower from the Netherlands. He won a silver medal in the 2000 Summer Olympics in the Men's Quadruple Sculls.
