= Guillaume Jeannet =

French rower

Personal information
- Nationality: French
- Born: 17 October 1977 (age 47); Mâcon, France

Sport
- Sport: Rowing

Guillaume Jeannet (born 17 October 1977) is a French rower. He competed in the men's quadruple sculls event at the 2000 Summer Olympics.
