= Yvan Deslavière =

French rower

Personal information
- Nationality: French
- Born: 28 May 1973 (age 51); Saint-Maur-des-Fossés, France

Sport
- Sport: Rowing

Yvan Deslavière (born 28 May 1973) is a French rower. He competed in the men's quadruple sculls event at the 2000 Summer Olympics.
