= Liu Jian (rower) =

Chinese rower

Personal information
- Nationality: Chinese
- Born: 23 April 1974 (age 51)

Sport
- Sport: Rowing

Liu Jian (born 23 April 1974) is a Chinese rower. He competed in the men's quadruple sculls event at the 2000 Summer Olympics.
