= Stijn Smulders =

Belgian rower

Personal information
- Nationality: Belgian
- Born: 7 August 1979 (age 45); Antwerp, Belgium

Sport
- Sport: Rowing

Stijn Smulders (born 7 August 1979) is a Belgian rower. He competed in the men's quadruple sculls event at the 2000 Summer Olympics.
