= Ian McGowan =

American rower

Personal information
- Born: May 23, 1979 (age 47) Seattle, Washington, United States

Sport
- Sport: Rowing
- Club: Augusta Training Center

Ian Matthew McGowan (born May 23, 1979) is an American rower. He competed in the men's quadruple sculls event at the 2000 Summer Olympics.
