= Nick Peterson =

American rower

Personal information
- Nationality: American
- Born: February 23, 1973 (age 53) Alexandria, Virginia, United States

Sport
- Sport: Rowing
- Club: Augusta SC; George Washington JHS

Nicholaas V. Peterson (born February 23, 1973) is an American rower. He competed in the men's quadruple sculls event at the 2000 Summer Olympics. He graduated from Harvard University.
