= Jadranka Savić =

Bosnian basketball player (born 1972)

Personal information
- Born: 26 November 1972 (age 53) Tuzla, SR Bosnia and Herzegovina, SFR Yugoslavia
- Listed height: 1.72 m (5 ft 8 in)
- Position: Shooting guard

Career history
- 1992: Jedinstvo Tuzla
- 2005–2006: Challes-les-Eaux Basket

Jadranka Savić (born 24 November 1972) is a former Yugoslav and Bosnian female basketball player. She represented Bosnia and Herzegovina at the 1999 EuroBasket for Women in Poland. She played shooting guard for ŽKK Jedinstvo from Tuzla, and between 2005–2006 for French team Challes-les-Eaux Basket. She currently works at here hometown club ŽKK Jedinstvo as a coach for youth basketball players.
