= Arnaud Duchesne =

Belgian rower

Personal information
- Nationality: Belgian
- Born: 3 May 1978 (age 46); Liège, Belgium

Sport
- Sport: Rowing

Arnaud Duchesne (born 3 May 1978) is a Belgian rower. He competed in the men's quadruple sculls event at the 2000 Summer Olympics.
