= Simone Raineri =

Italian rower

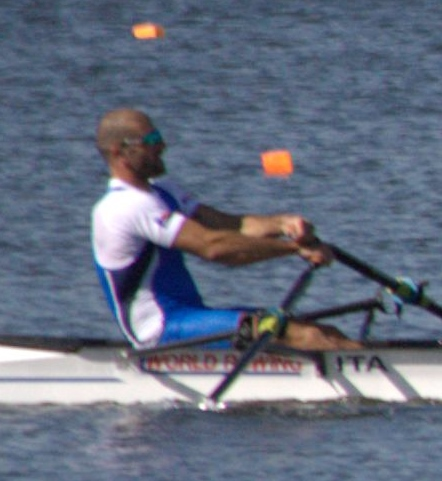

Personal information
- Born: 7 February 1977 (age 49)

Sport
- Country: Italy
- Sport: Men's rowing
- Club: Fiamme Gialle
Medal record
Men's rowing
Representing Italy
Olympic Games
Gold medal – first place	2000 Sydney	Quadruple sculls
Silver medal – second place	2008 Beijing	Quadruple sculls
World Rowing Championships
Silver medal – second place	2010 Karapiro	Quadruple sculls
Bronze medal – third place	2001 Lucerne	Quadruple sculls
Bronze medal – third place	2002 Seville	Quadruple sculls
European Rowing Championships
Silver medal – second place	2007 Poznań	Quadruple sculls
Bronze medal – third place	2013 Seville	Quadruple sculls
Mediterranean Games
Gold medal – first place	2005 Almería	Single sculls

Simone Raineri (born 7 February 1977 in Bozzolo, Mantua) is an Italian competition rower and Olympic champion.

He received a gold medal in quadruple sculls at the 2000 Summer Olympics in Sydney, together with Agostino Abbagnale, Rossano Galtarossa, and Alessio Sartori.

In the same event, he went on to win a European silver in 2007 and three World Championship medals – a bronze at Lucerne in 2001, another bronze at Sevilla in 2003, and a silver at Cambridge in 2010. After a disappointing 2004 Olympics, Raineri helped Italy’s quad win silver behind Poland at the 2008 Beijing Games, before competing at his fourth Olympics in London in 2012.
