= Coumba Cissé =

Senegalese basketball player

Personal information
- Born: 21 August 1975 (age 51) Dakar, Senegal
- Listed height: 181 cm (5 ft 11 in)

Coumba Cissé (born 21 August 1975) is a Senegalese former basketball player who competed in the 2000 Summer Olympics. She was born in Dakar.
