= Karol Łazar =

Polish rower

Personal information
- Nationality: Polish
- Born: 7 July 1976 (age 48); Gorzów Wielkopolski, Poland

Sport
- Sport: Rowing

Karol Łazar (born 7 July 1976) is a Polish rower. He competed in the men's quadruple sculls event at the 2000 Summer Olympics.
