= Kelsey Adrian =

Canadian basketball player

Personal information
- Born: October 5, 1989 (age 37) Langley, Canada
- Listed height: 1.86 m (6 ft 1 in)
- Listed weight: 68 kg (150 lb)
- Position: Shooting guard

Career history
- 2007-2009: California G. Bears
- 2010-2012: UCSB Gauchos

Kelsey Alexa Adrian (born October 5, 1989) is a Canadian female professional basketball player.

== California and UC Santa Barbara statistics ==
Ratios
Year	Team	GP	FG%	3P%	FT%	RBG	APG	BPG	SPG	PPG
2007-08	California	34	37.0%	31.5%	47.1%	2.50	0.85	0.06	0.24	4.68
2008-09	California	32	26.1%	24.7%	42.1%	2.03	0.47	0.06	0.09	3.22
2009-10	UC Santa Barbara	Sat due to NCAA transfer rules								
2010-11	UC Santa Barbara	30	36.9%	36.4%	60.0%	2.87	1.23	0.03	1.10	9.20
2011-12	UC Santa Barbara	33	33.9%	35.8%	46.2%	2.12	1.24	-	0.67	6.49
Career		129	34.1%	33.0%	51.2%	2.37	0.95	0.04	0.51	5.83

Totals
Year	Team	GP	FG	FGA	3P	3PA	FT	FTA	REB	A	BK	ST	PTS
2007-08	California	34	57	154	29	92	16	34	85	29	2	8	159
2008-09	California	32	37	142	21	85	8	19	65	15	2	3	103
2009-10	UC Santa Barbara	Sat due to NCAA transfer rules											
2010-11	UC Santa Barbara	30	97	263	52	143	30	50	86	37	1	33	276
2011-12	UC Santa Barbara	33	77	227	48	134	12	26	70	41	0	22	214
Career		129	268	786	150	454	66	129	306	122	5	66	752
