= Katarína Poláková =

Slovak basketball player (born 1979)

Katarína Poláková (born 30 December 1979 in Handlová) is a Slovak former basketball player who competed in the 2000 Summer Olympics.
