= Marcela Kalistová =

Slovak basketball player (born 1970)

Marcela Kalistová (born 17 February 1970, in Bardejov) is a Slovak former basketball player who competed in the 2000 Summer Olympics.
