= Marco Geisler =

German rower (born 1974)

Medal record

Men's rowing

Representing Germany

Olympic Games
Bronze medal – third place	2000 Sydney	M4x

World Championships
Gold medal – first place	1999 St. Catharines	M4x
Gold medal – first place	2001 Lucerne	M4x
Gold medal – first place	2002 Seville	M4x
Gold medal – first place	2003 Milan	M4x
Silver medal – second place	1995 Tampere	M4x
Silver medal – second place	1997 Aiguebelette	M4x
Silver medal – second place	1998 Cologne	M4x

Marco Geisler (born 18 January 1974 in Cottbus) is a German rower.
