= Adam Bronikowski =

Polish rower

Medal record

Men's rowing

Representing Poland

World Rowing Championships
Silver medal – second place	2002 Seville	M4x
Bronze medal – third place	2003 Milan	M4x

Adam Paweł Bronikowski (born 11 March 1978 in Warsaw) is a Polish rower. He competed for Poland at the 2000 Summer Olympics and the 2004 Summer Olympics.
