= Sheila Townsend =

Canadian basketball player

Personal information
- Born: October 2, 1980 (age 46) Vancouver, British Columbia, Canada
- Listed height: 1.76 m (5 ft 9 in)
- Position: Shooting guard

Career history
- 2006-2007: BG Dorsten
- 2007-2008: Valosun Brno

Sheila Mae Townsend (born October 2, 1980) is a Canadian female professional basketball player.

== Career ==
While earning her bachelor's degree in Human Kinetics, Townsend played with the University of British Columbia Thunderbirds basketball team from 2000-2005. As a co-captain in 2004, Townsend led the Thunderbirds to their first women's national basketball title.

After graduation, Townsend played professional basketball in Australia, Germany, and the Czech Republic. She also played on Canada's Women's National Team from 2004-07.
