= Dianne L'Ami =

New Zealand basketball player

Dianne L'Ami (born 24 April 1976) is a New Zealand former basketball player who competed in the 2000 Summer Olympics.
