= Fatime N'Diaye =

Senegalese basketball player (born 1976)

Fatime N'diane (born 14 September 1976) is a Senegalese former basketball player who competed in the 2000 Summer Olympics. She was born in Dakar.
