= Michał Wojciechowski =

Polish rower

Personal information
- Nationality: Polish
- Born: 22 February 1974 (age 51); Poznań, Poland

Sport
- Sport: Rowing

Michał Wojciechowski (born 22 February 1974) is a Polish rower. He competed in the men's quadruple sculls event at the 2000 Summer Olympics.
