= Sally Farmer =

New Zealand basketball player

Sally Farmer (born 20 May 1976) is a New Zealand former basketball player who competed in the 2000 Summer Olympics and in the 2004 Summer Olympics.
