= Soo-jin =

- Hangul: 수진
- RR: Sujin
- MR: Sujin

Soo-jin, also spelled Su-jin or Sue-jin, is a Korean given name. Soo-jin was the fifth-most popular name for baby girls in South Korea in 1980, third-most popular in 1988, and fifth-most popular again in 1990.

People with this name include:

== Artists and musicians ==
- Kang Sue-jin (born 1967), South Korean ballerina
- Yoo Chae-yeong (born Kim Soo-jin, 1974–2014), South Korean singer
- Seomoon Tak (born Lee Su-jin, 1978), South Korean singer
- Horan (singer) (born Choi Soo-jin, 1979), South Korean singer
- Soojin (born Seo Soo-jin, 1998), South Korean singer

== Film and television personalities ==
- Kang Soo-jin (voice actor) (born 1965), South Korean voice actor
- Kim Soo-jin (actress) (born 1974), South Korean actress
- Su-chin Pak (born 1976), South Korean-born American news reporter
- Lee Su-jin (director) (born 1977), South Korean film director
- Chae Min-seo (born Jo Soo-jin, 1981), South Korean actress
- Park Soo-jin (born 1985), South Korean actress
- Kyung Soo-jin (born 1987), South Korean actress
- Jeon Soo-jin (born 1988), South Korean actress
- Kang Soo-jin (voice actress) (fl. 1990s), South Korean voice actress
- Choi Soo-jin, South Korean voice actress

== Sportspeople ==
- Noh Soo-jin (born 1962), South Korean football player
- Wang Su-jin (born 1973), South Korean basketball player
- Kim Su-jin (swimmer) (born 1974), South Korean swimmer
- Yang Soo-jin (born 1988), South Korean modern pentathlete
- Kim Su-jin (curler) (born 1999), South Korean curler

== See also ==
- List of Korean given names
