= Kim Jung-eun (basketball) =

South Korean basketball player (born 1987)

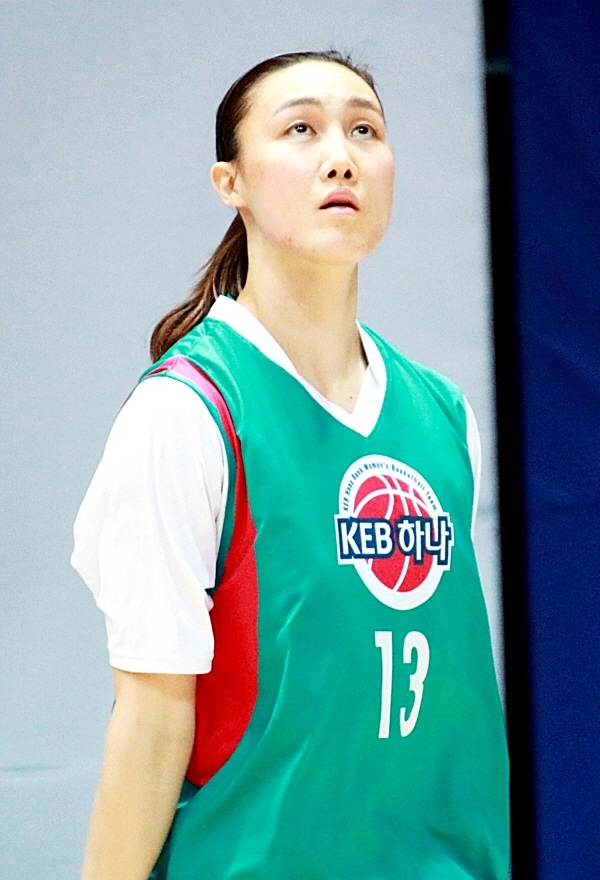

No. 13 – Bucheon KEB Hana Bank
- Position: Forward
- League: WKBL

Personal information
- Born: 7 September 1987 (age 39) Cheonan, South Korea
- Listed height: 5 ft 11 in (1.80 m)
- Listed weight: 150 lb (68 kg)

Career information
- WNBA draft: 2009: undrafted

Kim Jung-eun (born 7 September 1987) is a South Korean basketball player. She competed in the women's tournament at the 2008 Summer Olympics and the 2020 Summer Olympics.
