= Alessio Sartori =

Italian rower

Personal information
- Born: 13 November 1976 (age 49) Terracina, Latina, Italy

Sport
- Club: Fiamme Gialle
Medal record
Men's rowing
Representing Italy
Olympic Games
| Gold medal – first place | 2000 Sydney | Quadruple sculls |
| Silver medal – second place | 2012 London | Double sculls |
| Bronze medal – third place | 2004 Athens | Double sculls |
World Championships
| Gold medal – first place | 1994 Indianapolis | Quadruple sculls |
| Gold medal – first place | 1995 Tampere | Quadruple sculls |
| Gold medal – first place | 1998 Cologne | Quadruple sculls |
| Silver medal – second place | 2003 Milan | Double sculls |
| Silver medal – second place | 2006 Dorney Lake | Eight |
| Silver medal – second place | 2007 Munich | Coxless fours |
| Bronze medal – third place | 2002 Seville | Quadruple sculls |
Mediterranean Games
| Gold medal – first place | 2005 Almería | Double sculls |

Alessio Sartori (born 13 November 1976) is an Italian competition rower and Olympic champion.

== Biography ==
He received a gold medal in quadruple sculls at the 2000 Summer Olympics in Sydney, together with Agostino Abbagnale, Simone Raineri, and Rossano Galtarossa.

He received a bronze medal in the double scull event at the 2004 Summer Olympics in Athens, together with Rossano Galtarossa.

He received a silver medal in double sculls at the 2012 Summer Olympics in London, together with Romano Battisti.
