= Allison McNeill =

Canadian basketball coach

Allison McNeill (born 26 September 1959) is a Canadian basketball coach. At the 2012 Summer Olympics she coached the Canada women's team. After an illustrious 13-year career at SFU, advancing to 3 NAIA Final 4's, she served as the associate head coach at the University of Oregon helping the Ducks to the WNIT title in 2002 and an NCAA tournament spot in 2005.

She is currently the Head Coach of the BC Centre for Performance, the Tri-Cities Youth Basketball Association Master Coach and a public speaker. The Coaching Association of Canada awarded her the Geoff Gowan Award recognizing her lifetime contribution to coaching development in Canada.
