= Nikki Johnson =

Canadian basketball player

Nikki Johnson (born 26 June 1975) is a Canadian former basketball player who competed in the 2000 Summer Olympics.

Johnson played NAIA basketball at Simon Fraser University from 1994 to 1998. She was inducted into the SFU Sports Hall of Fame in 2018.
