= Krissy Badé =

French basketball player

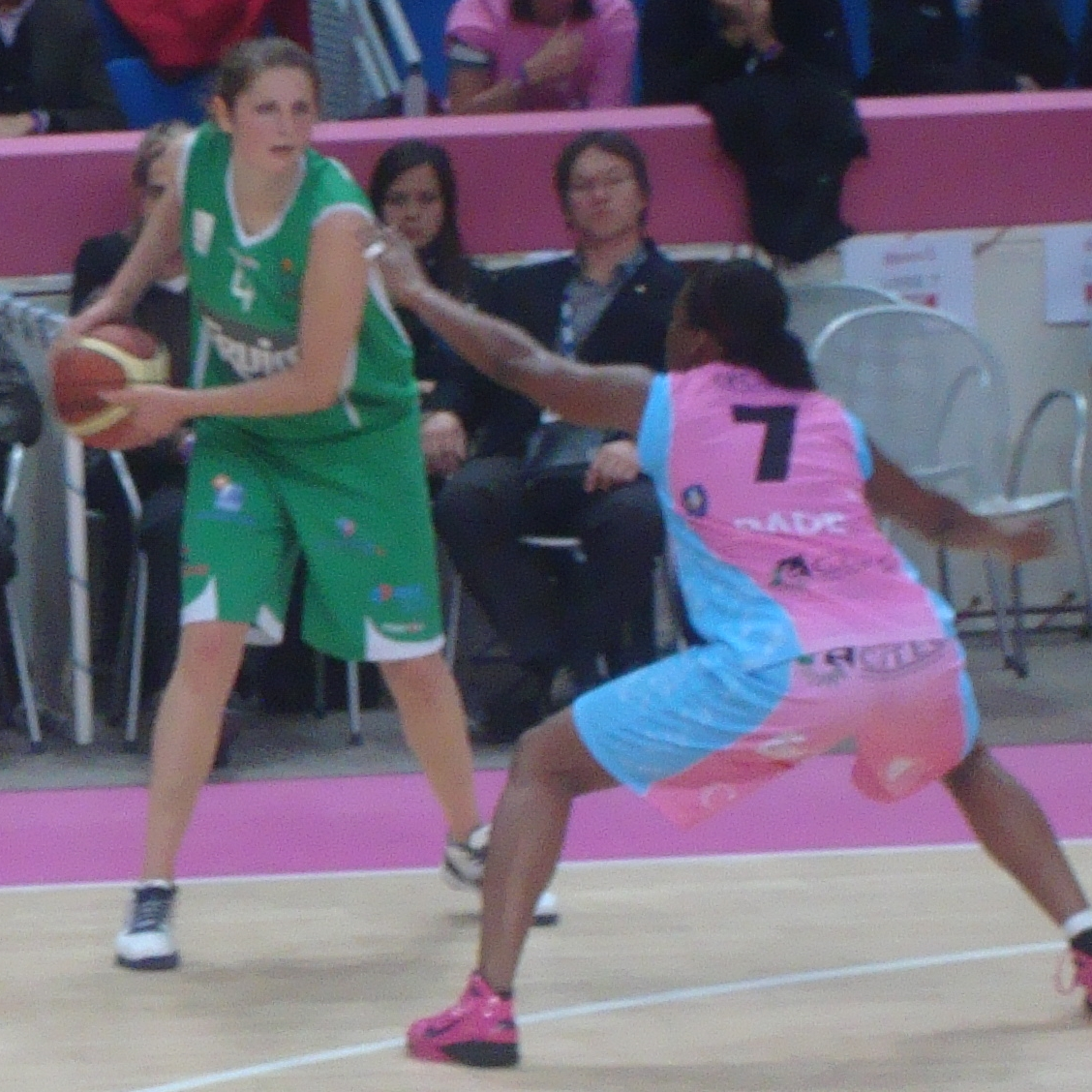
Badé (right)

Krissy Badé (born 31 July 1980 in Paris, France) is a basketball coach and a former French basketball player. Bade had 59 selections on the French national women's basketball team from 2002 to 2007.

== Biography ==
She started playing basketball at the age of 11 at ASAN Noisiel ( Seine-et-Marne ) and moved to the neighboring BC Lognes Marne-la-Vallée at the age of 14. It was during this season that she was spotted by the leaders of the Federal Center. She returned to INSEP in 1995 until 1998. She participated in the European championship with the French junior team where she finished 10th.

In the summer of 1998, she began her professional career at Avenir de Rennes, a team promoted to the Women's League (first professional division) and then joined the following season at ESBVA (from 1999 to 2002) where she demonstrated her full potential as a member of the team's management. In 2007, she achieved the French Cup - French Championship double with Valenciennes.

From 2002 to 200, she played a defensive joker role within the French team, often responsible for containing the main offensive player of the opposing team.

== Club career ==
- 1991-1994: Noisiel
- 1994-1995: Lognes
- 1995-1998: Federal Center
- 1998-1999: Rennes
- 1999-2002: Villeneuve-d'Ascq
- 2002-2004: Lattes-Montpellier
- 2004-2006: USO Mondeville
- 2006-2008: Valenciennes
- 2008-2009: Pallacanestro Virtus Viterbo (Italy)
- 2009-2010: CB Puig d’en Valls (Ibiza, Spain)
- 2010-2013: Arras Pays d'Artois Women's Basketball
- 2014-2015: AS Aulnoye-Aymeries

== Awards ==
- U17 French Cup in 2017
- Eurocup finalist in 2011
- Finalist of the Super Coppa (Spain) in 2009
- French Champion in 2007
- Winner of the Coupe de France in 2007, 2012
- Vice-champion of France NF1 in 2000
- Nike Camp MVP in 1999, 2000
- French NF1 Champion in 1996
