= Angela Đelmiš =

Serbian-Hungarian basketball player

Personal information
- Born: 5 November 1975 (age 51) Subotica, SR Serbia, SFR Yugoslavia
- Listed height: 1.74 m (5 ft 9 in)
- Listed weight: 62 kg (137 lb)

Career information
- Playing career: –2012
- Position: Shooting guard

Career history
- Pécs 2010
- Szeghed
- 2007–2009: NKK Szolnoki
- 2009–2011: UNI Győr
- 2011–2012: Herner TC

Angela Đelmiš (Serbian Cyrillic: Ангела Ђелмиш; born 5 November 1975) is a Serbian-Hungarian female professional basketball player.
