= Lara Mandić =

Yugoslavian-Serbian basketball player

Personal information
- Born: 23 April 1974 (age 52) Banja Luka, SFR Yugoslavia
- Listed height: 1.85 m (6 ft 1 in)

Career information
- Playing career: 1988–20??
- Position: Small forward

Career history
- 1988–1992: Mladi Krajišnik
- 1992–1996: Crvena zvezda
- Profi D Pančevo
- Hemofarm
- UNIQA Euroleasing Sopron
- MBK Ružomberok
- –2006: Ros Casares Valencia
- 2006–2007: Beşiktaş JK
- 2007–: Montpellier
- Provance

Lara Mandić (Serbian: Лара Мандић; born 23 April 1974) is a Yugoslavian and Serbian former female basketball player.
