= Sławomir Kruszkowski =

Polish rower

Medal record

Men's rowing

Representing Poland

World Rowing Championships
Silver medal – second place	2002 Seville	Quad scull
Bronze medal – third place	2003 Milan	Quad scull

European Championships
Silver medal – second place	2007 Poznań	Eight

Slawomir Kruszkowski (born 14 October 1975 in Toruń) is a Polish olympic rower.
