= Anna Wielebnowska =

Polish basketball player (born 1978)

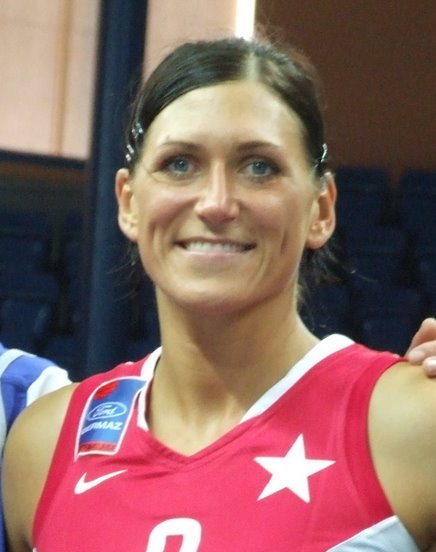
Anna Wielebnowska in 2009

Anna Lucyna Wielebnowska (born 17 April 1978 in Kraków) is a Polish former basketball player who competed in the 2000 Summer Olympics.
