= Khady Yacine Ngom =

Senegalese basketball player

Khady Yacine Ngom (born March 1, 1979, in Dakar) is a Senegalese basketball player. She played on the Senegal women's national basketball team that competed at the 2000 Summer Olympics. Ngom also represented Senegal at the 2006 FIBA World Championship for Women in Brazil.
