= Edyta Koryzna =

Polish basketball player

Edyta Koryzna (born 19 March 1973 in Białystok) is a Polish former basketball player who competed in the 2000 Summer Olympics.
