= Kang Ji-sook =

South Korean basketball player

- Hangul: 강지숙
- RR: Gang Jisuk
- MR: Kang Chisuk

Kang Ji-sook (born 4 February 1979) is a Korean former basketball player who competed in the 2000 Summer Olympics and in the 2004 Summer Olympics.
