= Joy McNichol =

Canadian basketball player

Joy McNichol (born 17 February 1974 in Wingham, Ontario) is a Canadian former basketball player who competed in the 2000 Summer Olympics.
