= Wang Su-jin =

South Korean basketball player

- Born: 4 September 1973 (age 52)
- Occupation: Basketball player

Korean name
- Hangul: 왕수진
- RR: Wang Sujin
- MR: Wang Sujin

Wang Su-jin (born 4 September 1973) is a South Korean former basketball player who competed in the 2000 Summer Olympics.
