= Violeta Vuković =

Serbian basketball player

Personal information
- Born: 3 December 1972 (age 53) Nova Varoš, SFR Yugoslavia
- Listed height: 1.88 m (6 ft 2 in)

Career information
- Playing career: –2009
- Position: Power forward

Career history
- –2002: Vojvodina
- 2002–: Hemofarm
- Pantere Basket
- 2005–2006: Szeviép-Szeged KE
- BSE Budapest
- Vojvodina
- 2008–2009: Basket Spezia Club

Violeta Vuković (Serbian Cyrillic: Виолета Вуковић, born 3 December 1972 in Nova Varoš, SFR Yugoslavia) is a Serbian female basketball player. In career played in Vojvodina, Hemofarm, Pantere Basket, Szeviép-Szeged KE, BSE Budapest and Basket Spezia Club.
