= Sandra Dijon =

French basketball player (born 1976)

Medal record

Representing France

European Championships
Gold medal – first place	2001 France	Team

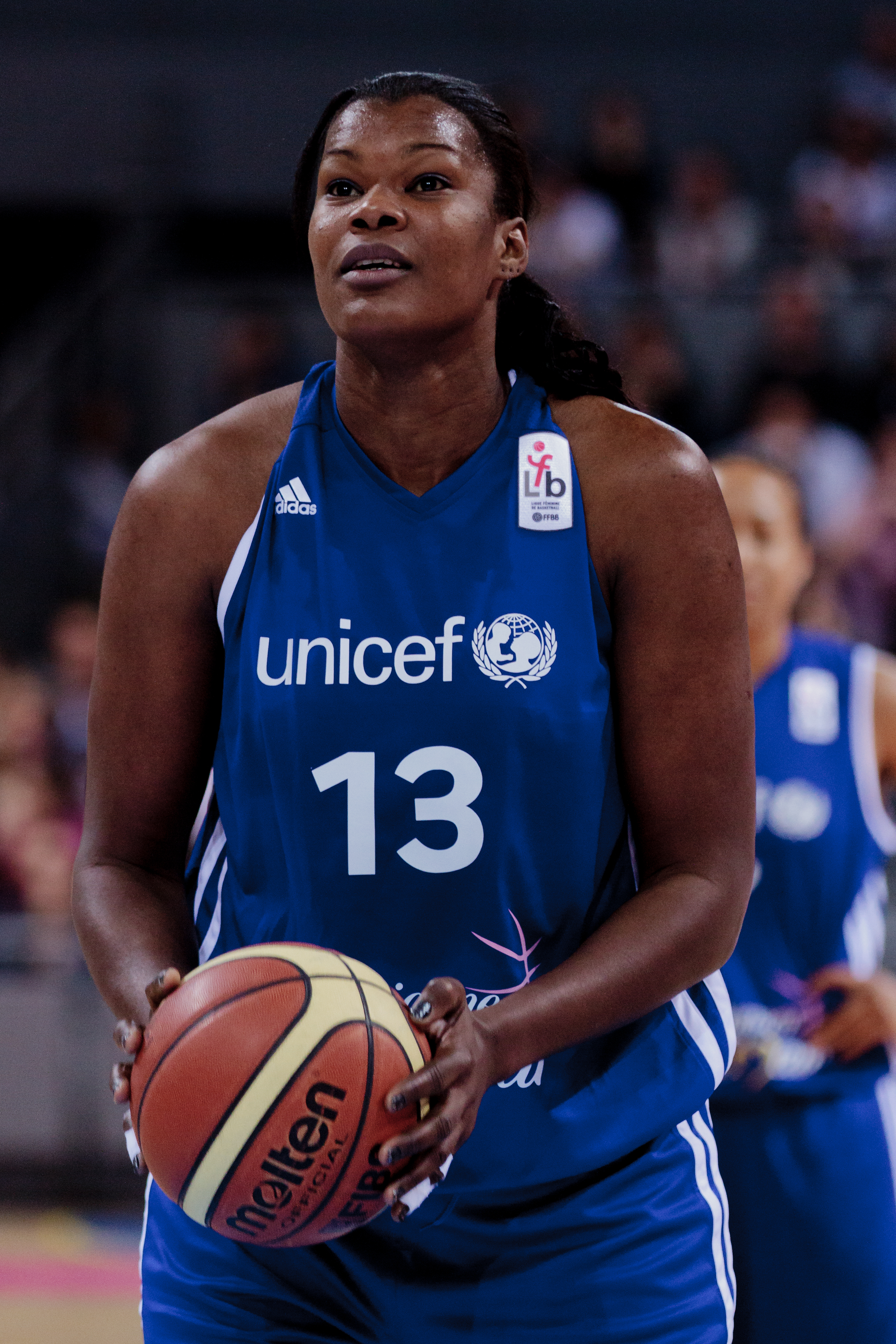
Sandra Dijon, 2014

Sandra Dijon (born 10 January 1976 in Fort-de-France, Martinique), for some time known as Sandra Dijon-Gérardin, is a French basketball player who played 133 matches for the French women's national basketball team from 2001 to 2008.
