= Elżbieta Nowak =

Polish basketball player

Medal record

Women's basketball

Representing Poland

European Championships
Gold medal – first place	1999 Poland	Team

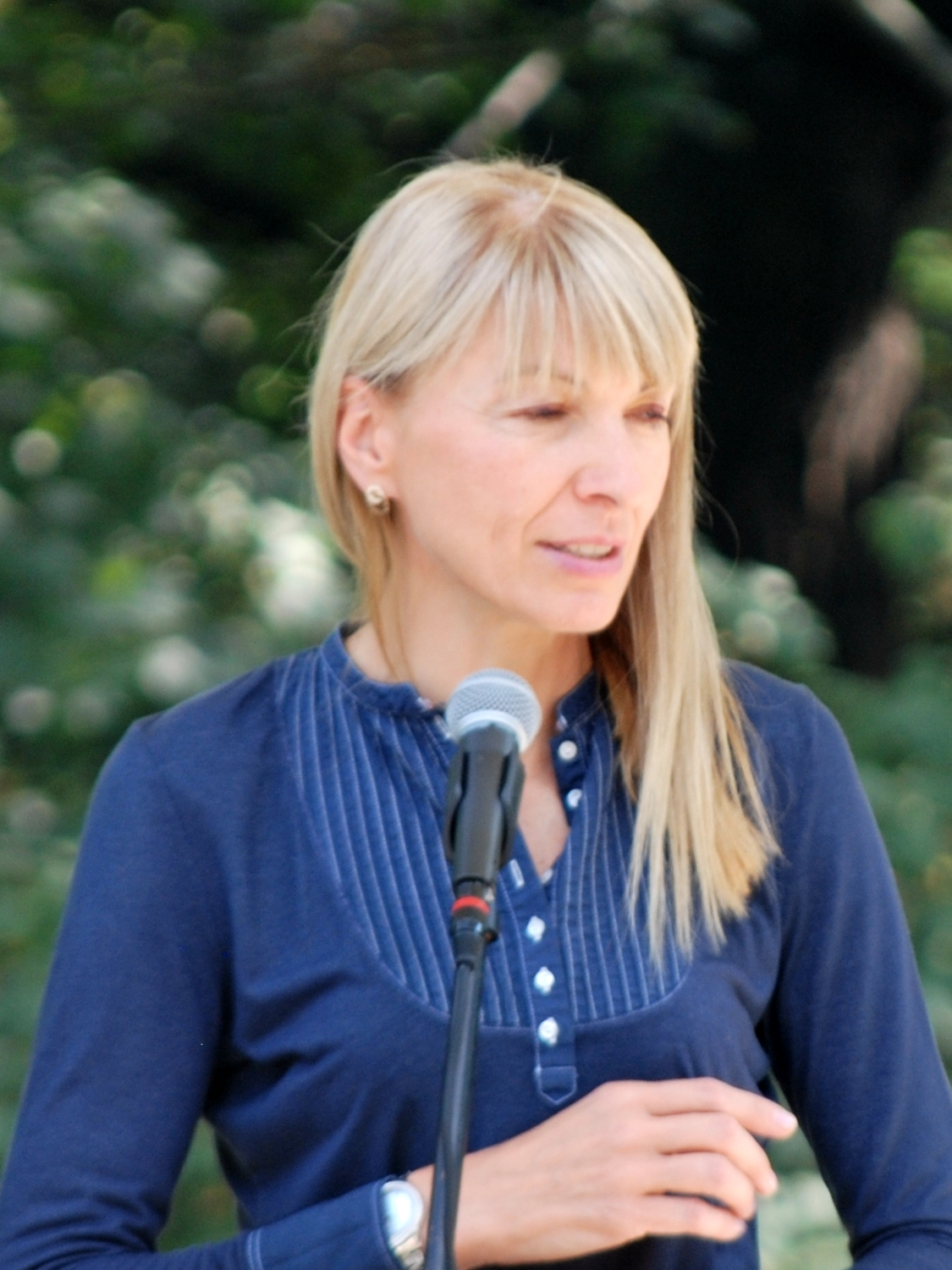
Elżbieta Nowak, former basketball player from Poland, European champion

Elżbieta Nowak (born 2 September 1972) is a Polish former basketball player who competed in the 2000 Summer Olympics.
