= Patrycja Czepiec =

Polish basketball player (born 1973)

International medals

Women's basketball

Representing Poland

European Championships
Gold medal – first place	1999 Poland	Team

Patrycja Monika Czepiec (born 2 January 1973) is a Polish former basketball player who competed in the 2000 Summer Olympics.
