= Joanna Cupryś =

Polish basketball player

International medals

Women's basketball

Representing Poland

European Championships
Gold medal – first place	1999 Poland	Team

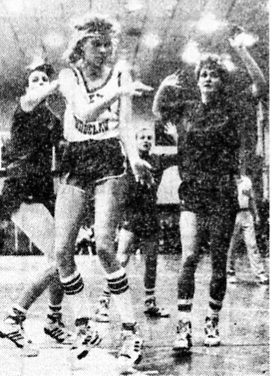
Cupryś 1991

Joanna Cupryś (born 8 February 1972) is a Polish former basketball player who competed in the 2000 Summer Olympics. The Polish team placed 8th in the tournament, with Cupryś playing a key role by contributing an average of 7.3 points and 2 rebounds per game throughout the competition.

Cupryś’s basketball career extended beyond the Olympics. She played for Lotos VBW Clima Gdynia in Poland and was also active in European leagues, including stints in the United States and France, where she honed her skills, particularly her three-point shooting ability.
