= Dorota Bukowska =

Polish former basketball player

International medals

Women's basketball

Representing Poland

European Championships
Gold medal – first place	1999 Poland	Team

Dorota Bukowska (born 20 April 1972, in Gdynia) is a Polish former basketball player who competed in the 2000 Summer Olympics.
