= Krystyna Szymańska-Lara =

Polish basketball player

Personal information
- Born: September 30, 1969 (age 57) Nidzica, Poland
- Listed height: 1.70 m (5 ft 7 in)

Career information
- Playing career: 1986–2010

Career history
- until 1986: MKS Nidzica
- 1986–1994: Polonia Warsaw
- 1994–2000: Wisła Krakow
- 1999: Utah Starzz
- 2001–2010: Dexia W Namur (Belgia)
- Stats at Basketball Reference
Medals
Women's basketball
Representing Poland
European Championships
Gold medal – first place	1999 Poland	Team Poland

Krystyna Szymańska-Lara (born 30 September 1969) is a Polish former basketball player who competed in the 2000 Summer Olympics.

== Achievements ==
Based on unless otherwise noted.

Team

- 7-time Belgian champion (2002–2007, 2009)
- Vice Champion of Poland (1999)
- Bronze medalist of the Polish Championships (1998, 2000)
- 8-time Belgian Cup winner (2002–2009)
- Polish Cup finalist (1991)

Individual

- PLKK female shooter leader (1997)
- Selected to the first squad of the European Championships (1999)

National team

- European Champion (1999)
- Participant:
  - Championship:
    - Europe (1991 – 6th place, 1999, 2003 – 4th place)
    - Europe U-18 (1988 – 8th place)
  - Olympic Games (2000 – 8th)
