= Ilona Mądra =

Polish basketball player (born 1966)

International medals

Women's basketball

Representing Poland

European Championships
Gold medal – first place	1999 Poland	Team

Ilona Mądra (born 3 December 1966) is a Polish former basketball player who competed in the 2000 Summer Olympics.
