= Katarzyna Dydek =

Polish basketball player (born 1970)

Personal information
- Born: 21 March 1970 (age 56) Warsaw, Poland
- Listed height: 6 ft 7 in (2.01 m)
- Stats at Basketball Reference
Medals
Representing Poland
Basketball
European Championships
Gold medal – first place	1999 Poland	Team

Katarzyna Elżbieta Dydek (born 21 March 1970 in Warsaw) is a retired Polish basketball player who competed in the 2000 Summer Olympics. Standing at 6 ft 7 in [2.01 m], she also played for the Colorado Xplosion of the now-defunct American Basketball League.

She is the older sister of Małgorzata 'Margo' Dydek (1974–2011).
