= List of EuroLeague Women winning players =

The list of EuroLeague Women winning players shows all players who have won the EuroLeague Women, the top-tier professional basketball club competition in Europe, formerly known as FIBA Women's European Champions Cup (1958-1996).

== Winning players since 1959 ==
Titles	Nat	Player	Team(s)	Years
11	(Latvia)	Skaidrīte Smildziņa-Budovska	(Soviet Union) Daugava Rīga	1960-62, 1964–69, 1971, 1972
11	(Latvia)	Dzintra Grundmane	(Soviet Union) Daugava Rīga	1964-69, 1971–75
11	(Latvia)	Tamara Karklina-Hendele	(Soviet Union) Daugava Rīga	1965-68, 1970–75, 1977
11	(Latvia)	Uļjana Semjonova	(Soviet Union) Daugava Rīga	1968-75, 1977, 1981, 1982
10	(Latvia)	Marita Bikse	(Soviet Union) Daugava Rīga	1967-75, 1977
10	(Latvia)	Maija Saleniece-Silina	(Soviet Union) Daugava Rīga	1969-75, 1977, 1981, 1982
9	(Latvia)	Silvija Ravdone-Krodere	(Soviet Union) Daugava Rīga	1960-62, 1964–69
9	(Latvia)	Ingrīa Bergvalde-Ose	(Soviet Union) Daugava Rīga	1965-69, 1971–74
9	(Latvia)	Inta Pliuna-Pane	(Soviet Union) Daugava Rīga	1969-70, 1972–75, 1977, 1981-82
8	(Latvia)	Māra Žvigule-Bogdanoviča-Kampus	(Soviet Union) Daugava Rīga	1966-69, 1971–74
7	(Latvia)	Sarmite Karina Martinova-Volbete	(Soviet Union) Daugava Rīga	1960-62, 1964–67
7	(Latvia)	Ingrīda Strupoviča-Blūma-Bulavko	(Soviet Union) Daugava Rīga	1960-62, 1964, 1965, 1967, 1968
7	(Latvia)	Arija Rimbeniece	(Soviet Union) Daugava Rīga	1961, 1962, 1964–68
7	(Latvia)	Silvija Skulme	(Soviet Union) Daugava Rīga	1969-73, 1975, 1977
7	(Latvia)	Maiga Saleniece-Skapane	(Soviet Union) Daugava Rīga	1970-75, 1977
7	(Italy)	Catarina Pollini	(Italy) AS Vicenza (5), (Italy) Cesena, (Italy) Comense	1983, 1985, 1986, 1987, 1988, 1991, 1995
7	(Italy)	Mara Fullin, Stefania Passaro	(Italy) AS Vicenza (5), (Italy) Comense (2)	1983, 1985, 1986, 1987, 1988, 1994, 1995
7	(Belgium)	Emma Meesseman	(Russia) Ekaterinburg (4), (Turkey) Fenerbahçe (3)	2016, 2018, 2019, 2021, 2023, 2024, 2026
6	(Latvia)	Zanda Grave	(Soviet Union) Daugava Rīga	1965, 1966, 1967, 1968, 1970, 1971
6	(Latvia)	Lilita Svarinska-Bergvalde	(Soviet Union) Daugava Rīga	1970, 1971, 1972, 1973, 1974, 1975
6	(Italy)	Lidia Gorlin	(Italy) Fiat Torino, (Italy) AS Vicenza (5)	1980, 1983 1985, 1986, 1987, 1988
6	(United States)	Diana Taurasi	(Russia) Spartak Moscow (4), (Russia) Ekaterinburg (2)	2007, 2008, 2009, 2010, 2013, 2016
6	(Russia)	Natalia Vieru	(Russia) Spartak Moscow (3), (Russia) Ekaterinburg (3)	2008, 2009, 2010, 2016, 2018, 2019
6	(Spain)	Alba Torrens	(Spain) CB Avenida, (Turkey) Galatasaray, (Russia) Ekaterinburg (4)	2011, 2014, 2016, 2018, 2019, 2021
5	(Latvia)	Jolanta Kalnina-Altberga, Ināra Pirtnieka-Apse, Helena Bitnere-Hehta, Maiga Traukmane-Graudina, Jolanta Kalnina-Altberga	(Soviet Union) Daugava Rīga	1960, 1961, 1962, 1964, 1965
5	(Latvia)	Tatjana Lupova	(Soviet Union) Daugava Rīga	1970, 1971, 1972, 1973, 1974
5	(Italy)	Valentina Peruzzo	(Italy) AS Vicenza	1983, 1985, 1986, 1987, 1988
5	(Bosnia and Herzegovina)	Razija Mujanović	(Socialist Federal Republic of Yugoslavia) Jedinstvo Tuzla, (Spain) Dorna Godella Valencia (2), (Italy) Comense (2)	1989, 1992, 1993, 1994, 1995
5	(Russia)	Irina Osipova	(Russia) Ekaterinburg, (Russia) Spartak Moscow (4)	2003, 2007, 2008, 2009, 2010
4	(Latvia)	Ligita Altberga-Andersone	(Soviet Union) Daugava Rīga	1960, 1961, 1962, 1964
4	(Latvia)	Marite Jansone	(Soviet Union) Daugava Rīga	1968, 1969, 1970, 1971
4	(Latvia)	Gunta Kauķe	(Soviet Union) Daugava Rīga	1973, 1974, 1975, 1977
4	(Latvia)	Ilona Medne-Kalnina	(Soviet Union) Daugava Rīga	1974, 1975, 1977, 1981
4	(Italy)	Stefania Stanzani	(Italy) AS Vicenza	1983, 1985, 1986, 1987
4	(United States)	Janice Lawrence	(Italy) AS Vicenza	1985, 1986, 1987, 1988
4	(Belgium)	Ann Wauters	(France) Valenciennes (2), (Russia) CSKA Samara, (Spain) Ros Casares	2002, 2004, 2005, 2012
4	(United States)	Sue Bird	(Russia) Spartak Moscow	2007, 2008, 2009, 2010
4	(Russia)	Marina Karpunina	(Russia) Spartak Moscow	2007, 2008, 2009, 2010
4	(Spain) (Saint Vincent and the Grenadines)	Sancho Lyttle	(Spain) CB Avenida, (Spain) Ros Casares, (Turkey) Galatasaray, (Russia) Ekaterinburg	2011, 2012, 2014, 2016
4	(Russia)	Olga Arteshina	(Russia) CSKA Samara, (Russia) Ekaterinburg (3)	2005, 2013, 2016, 2018
4	(United States)	Brittney Griner	(Russia) Ekaterinburg	2016, 2018, 2019, 2021
4	(United States)	Kayla McBride	(Russia) Ekaterinburg, (Turkey) Fenerbahçe (3)	2019, 2023, 2024, 2026
3	(Latvia)	Dzidra Uztupe-Karamiseva, Iveta Edīte Kraukle-Čikute, Guna Margrieta Ievina-Karlsone	(Soviet Union) Daugava Rīga	1960, 1961, 1962
3	(Latvia)	Tekla Buceniece-Sepko	(Soviet Union) Daugava Rīga	1962, 1971, 1972
3	(Latvia)	Ieva Velga Augle-Naudzuna	(Soviet Union) Daugava Rīga	1964, 1965, 1966
3	(Latvia)	Līga Grinberga-Lisnere	(Soviet Union) Daugava Rīga	1971, 1981, 1982
3	(Latvia)	Ingrīda Liekna-Kublina	(Soviet Union) Daugava Rīga	1974, 1975, 1977
3	(Latvia)	Daina Grinberga-Magazniece	(Soviet Union) Daugava Rīga	1974, 1977, 1981
3	(Italy)	Wanda Sandon	(Italy) Geas Sesto, (Italy) FIAT Torino, (Italy) AS Vicenza	1978, 1980, 1983
3	(Italy)	Paola Barocco	(Italy) AS Vicenza	1986, 1987, 1988
3	(Slovakia)	Anna Kotočová	(France) Bourges Basket	1997, 1998, 2001
3	(France)	Cathy Melain, Yannick Souvré	(France) Bourges Basket	1997, 1998, 2001
3	(Slovakia)	Alena Kováčová, Zuzana Žirková	(Slovakia) Ružomberok (2); (Czech Republic) Gambrinus Brno	1999, 2000, 2006
3	(Russia)	Ilona Korstin	(France) Bourges Basket, (Russia) CSKA Samara, (Russia) Spartak Moscow	2001, 2005, 2010
3	(France)	Edwige Lawson	(France) Valenciennes Olympic (2), (Russia) CSKA Samara	2002, 2004, 2005
3	(Russia)	Tatiana Shchegoleva	(Russia) CSKA Samara, (Russia) Spartak Moscow (2)	2005, 2008, 2009
3	(Czech Republic)	Jana Veselá	(Czech Republic) Gambrinus Brno, (Spain) Ros Casares, (Czech Republic) USK Praha	2006, 2012, 2015
3	(United States)	Kelly Miller	(Russia) Spartak Moscow	2008, 2009, 2010
3	(Australia)	Lauren Jackson	(Russia) Spartak Moscow (2), (Spain) Ros Casares Valencia	2008, 2009, 2012
3	(Serbia)	Sonja Petrović	(Russia) Spartak Moscow (2), (Czech Republic) USK Praha	2009, 2010, 2015
3	(Spain)	Silvia Domínguez	(Spain) CB Avenida, (Spain) Ros Casares, (Russia) Ekaterinburg	2011, 2012, 2013
3	(United States) (Russia)	Deanna Nolan	(Russia) Ekaterinburg	2013, 2016, 2018
3	(Slovenia)	Nika Baric	(Russia) Ekaterinburg	2016, 2018, 2019
3	(Russia)	Evgenia Belyakova	(Russia) Ekaterinburg	2016, 2018, 2019
3	(Russia)	Elena Beglova,	(Russia) Ekaterinburg	2018, 2019, 2021
3	(Russia)	Maria Vadeeva	(Russia) Dynamo Kursk, (Russia) Ekaterinburg (2)	2017, 2019, 2021
3	(United States) (Hungary)	Courtney Vandersloot	(Russia) Ekaterinburg (2), (Turkey) Fenerbahçe	2019, 2021, 2023
3	(Turkey)	Alperi Onar	(Turkey) Fenerbahçe (3)	2023, 2024, 2026
3	(United States)	Breanna Stewart	(Russia) Ekaterinburg, (Turkey) Fenerbahçe (2)	2021, 2023, 2026
2	(Bulgaria)	Blagovesta Chengelieva, Dora Damianova-Kuzova, Elena Gospodinova, Tanya Todorova, Vanya Voynova	(Bulgaria) Slavia Sofia	1959, 1963
2	(Latvia)	Zigrīda Reiziņa-Grēvele	(Soviet Union) Daugava Rīga	1969, 1973
2	(Latvia)	Velta Staņēviča-Bērziņa	(Soviet Union) Daugava Rīga	1970, 1971
2	(Latvia)	Maija Floretaka-Konstantinova-Kublina	(Soviet Union) Daugava Rīga	1975, 1977
2	(Latvia)	Lorita Vasiļjeva-Sauša	(Soviet Union) Daugava Rīga	1977, 1982
2	(Latvia)	Marianna Feodorova, Ilze Šulca-Brumermane, Vita Dudina-Elksne-Oliņa, Lija Judasa, Inita Rītiņa-Kresa, Ilga Briede-Priedolina, Mudīte Gūtmane-Zandere	(Soviet Union) Daugava Rīga	1981, 1982
2	(Canada)	Bev Smith	(Italy) AS Vicenza	1983, 1985
2	(Italy)	Antonella Armilletti	(Italy) AS Vicenza	1983, 1985
2	(Italy)	Laura Biondani	(Italy) AS Vicenza	1985, 1986
2	(United States)	Teresa Edwards	(Italy) AS Vicenza, (France) Valenciennes Olympic	1987, 2002
2	(Italy)	Francesca Bortolan, Amalia Pomilio	(Italy) AS Vicenza	1987, 1988
2	(Spain)	Ana Junyer, Luisa Bisetti, Laura Grande, Paloma Sánchez	(Spain) Dorna Godella Valencia	1992, 1993
2	(Russia)	Natalya Zasulskaya	(Spain) Dorna Godella Valencia	1992, 1993
2	(Italy)	Angela Arcangeli, Viviana Ballabio, Silvia Todeschini	(Italy) SFT Como	1994, 1995
2	(United States)	Bridgette Gordon	(Italy) SFT Como	1994, 1995
2	(France)	Isabelle Fijalkowski	(France) Bourges Basket, (France) Valenciennes Olympic	1997, 2002
2	(France)	Stéphanie Vivenot, Sandrine Ronot, Odile Santaniello	(France) Bourges Basket	1997, 1998
2	(Czech Republic)	Eva Nemcova	(France) Bourges Basket	1997, 1998
2	(Slovakia)	Iveta Bieliková, Slávka Frniaková, Martina Godályová, Yelena Marenchikova, Natalia Svisceva,	(Slovakia) Ružomberok	1999, 2000
2	(France)	Sandra Le Dréan, Audrey Sauret	(France) Valenciennes Olympic	2002, 2004
2	(United States)	Allison Feaster	(France) Valenciennes Olympic	2002, 2004
2	(United States)	Delisha Milton	(Russia) Ekaterinburg, (Czech Republic) Gambrinus Brno	2003, 2006
2	(Russia)	Svetlana Abrosimova	(Russia) CSKA Samara, (Russia) Spartak Moscow	2005, 2007
2	(Russia)	Maria Stepanova	(Russia) CSKA Samara, (Russia) Ekaterinburg	2005, 2013
2	(United States)	Tina Thompson	(Russia) Spartak Moscow	2007, 2008
2	(Russia)	Yekaterina Lisina	(Russia) Spartak Moscow	2007, 2010
2	(United States)	Anastasia Anderson	(Russia) Spartak Moscow	2008, 2010
2	(United States)	Sylvia Fowles	(Russia) Spartak Moscow	2009, 2010
2	(Russia)	Maria Cherepanova	(Russia) Spartak Moscow, (Russia) Ekaterinburg	2009, 2016
2	(Latvia)	Anete Jēkabsone-Žogota	(Russia) Spartak Moscow, (Russia) Ekaterinburg	2010, 2013
2	(Spain)	Laia Palau	(Spain) Ros Casares, (Czech Republic) USK Praha	2012, 2015
2	(United States)	Maya Moore	(Spain) Ros Casares, (Russia) Ekaterinburg	2012, 2018
2	(France)	Sandrine Gruda	(Russia) Ekaterinburg	2013, 2016
2	(United States) (Slovakia)	Kristi Toliver	(Russia) Ekaterinburg	2016, 2018
2	(Russia)	Raisa Musina	(Russia) Ekaterinburg	2018, 2019
2	(Russia)	Tatiana Petrushina, Viktoria Zavialova	(Russia) Ekaterinburg	2018, 2021
2	(Russia)	Evgeniia Beliakova	(Russia) Ekaterinburg	2019, 2021
2	(France)	Gabby Williams	(Hungary) Sopron Basket, (Turkey) Fenerbahçe	2022, 2026
2	(Turkey)	Merve Aydın, İdil Saçalır	(Turkey) Fenerbahçe (2)	2023, 2024
2	(United States)	Natasha Howard	(Turkey) Fenerbahçe (2)	2023, 2024
2	(Czech Republic)	Tereza Vyoralová	(Czech Republic) USK Praha (2)	2015, 2025
2	(Turkey)	Olcay Çakır	(Turkey) Fenerbahçe (2)	2023, 2026
2	(Turkey)	Sevgi Uzun, Tilbe Şenyürek	(Turkey) Fenerbahçe (2)	2024, 2026
2	(Serbia)	Nikolina Milić	(Turkey) Fenerbahçe (2)	2024, 2026
2	(Bosnia and Herzegovina) (The Bahamas)	Jonquel Jones	(Russia) Ekaterinburg (2)	2021, 2026
1	(Bulgaria)	Dora Chalashkanova-Vasileva, Teodora Dupcheva, Petya Ivanova, Raina Rangel, Dora Smedovska	(Bulgaria) Slavia Sofia	1959
1	(Latvia)	1960: Vita Karpova-Siliņa-Luka, Astra Bernava-Straume; 1962: Ruta Stepanova; 1965: Dace Fricsone-Ansone; 1968: Edīte Tuča; 1973: Sandra Jostiņa; 1975: Tamara Kalagina-Dauniene; 1981: Ilona Sāmeite, Laimdota Šurkusa-Zariņa; 1982: Anete Muižniece-Brice, Dace Zeltiņa-Reča	(Soviet Union) Daugava Rīga	1960, 1962, 1965, 1968, 1973, 1975, 1981, 1982
1	(Bulgaria)	Violeta Chausheva, Tina Dineva, Boyanka Dzheneva, Maria Ivanova, Svetla Nestorova, Lili Plyakova, Dora Vassileva	(Bulgaria) Slavia Sofia	1963
1	(Czech Republic)	Bubeniková, Ludmila Chmeliková, Jana Doležalová, Hana Doušová-Jarošová, Dana Hojsaková, Marta Jirásková-Pechová, Dana Klimesová-Ptáčková, Hana Kopecká, Ivana Kořínková-Kolínská, Kotrbatá, Linártová, Nováková, Vitovcová	(Czechoslovakia) Sparta Prague	1976
1	(Italy)	Maria Baldini, Rosa Maria "Lella" Battistella, Mabel Bocchi, Rosetta Bozzolo, Daniela Cesati, Dora Ciaccia, Giusy Fogliani, Marina Re, Cristina Tonelli	(Italy) Geas Sesto San Giovanni	1978
1	(Serbia)	Vukica Mitić, Jasmina Milosavljević, Sofija Pekić, Zorica Ðurković, Natalija Bacanović, Zorica Djurkovic, Jasmina Kalić, Vesna Kovačević, Biljana Marković, Spomenka Mrđenović, Dragana Pandurov, Sofia Pekic, Anđa Vukmirović, Gordana Vukmirović	(Socialist Federal Republic of Yugoslavia) Crvena zvezda	1979
1	(Italy)	Silvia Daprà, Roberta Faccin, Orietta Grossi, Chiara Guzzonato, Giuseppina Montanari, Sandra Palombarini, Mariangela Piancastelli, Rosanna Vergnano	(Italy) FIAT Torino	1980
1	(Italy)	1983: Cappellini; 1985: Dal Corso; 1986: Cappa; 1988: Adamoli, Noale, Silvestrini	(Italy) AS Vicenza	1983, 1985, 1986, 1988
1	(Bulgaria)	Krasimira Banova, Silvija Germanova, Nadka Golcheva, Ina Ivanova, Nina Khadzhiyankova, Petkana Makaveeva, Aneta Mikova, Kostadinka Radkova, Madlena Staneva, Todorova, Radmila Vasileva	(Bulgaria) Levski Sofia	1984
1	(Bosnia and Herzegovina)	Mara Lakić, Ilvana Zvizdić, Zorica Dragičević, Naida Hot, Jadranka Savić, Vesna Pođanin, Dragana Jeftić	(Socialist Federal Republic of Yugoslavia) Jedinstvo Tuzla	1989
1	(Serbia)	Smilja Rađenović, Stojanka Došić	(Socialist Federal Republic of Yugoslavia) Jedinstvo Tuzla	1989
1	(Italy)	Sofia Vinci, Silvia Daprà, Giusy Cecchi, Annarita Anellino, Elisabetta Pasini, Cristina Rivellini, Pina Tufano, Maria Puglisi, Daniela Altamore, Deborah Carta,	(Italy) Enimont Priolo	1990
1	(Russia)	Svetlana Kuznetsova	(Italy) Enimont Priolo	1990
1	(United States)	Regina Street	(Italy) Enimont Priolo	1990
1	(Italy)	Ivana Caldato, Ivana Donadel, Laura Gori, Andrea Lloyd, Novella Schiesaro, Renatta Zocco	(Italy) Conad Cesena	1991
1	(United States)	Clarissa Davis	(Italy) Conad Cesena	1991
1	(Spain)	Rosa Castillo, Emma Bezós, María Teresa Almoguera, Esther Tordesillas	(Spain) Dorna Godella Valencia	1992
1	(Spain)	Piluca Alonso, Ana Belén Álvaro, Margarita Geuer, Amaya Valdemoro, Pilar Valero	(Spain) Dorna Godella Valencia	1993
1	(United States)	Katrina McClain	(Spain) Dorna Godella Valencia	1993
1	(Italy)	Elena Paparazzo	(Italy) SFT Como	1994
1	(Italy)	Elena Rodighiero, Renata Salvestrini, Monica Stazzonelli	(Italy) SFT Como	1995
1	(Germany)	Marlies Askamp, Stefanie Egger, Andrea Harder, Martina Kehrenberg, Ute Krätschmann, Petra Kremer, Heike Roth, Maren Schiller, Michelle Sheetz, Michelle Timms	(Germany) Wuppertal	1996
1	(Australia)	Sandy Brondello, Michele Timms	(Germany) Wuppertal	1996
1	(France)	Michèle Jeanne, Muriel Robini	(France) Bourges Basket	1997
1	(France)	Leslie Ardon, Sabrina Agaesse, Alexandra van Embricqs, Christelle Jouandon	(France) Bourges Basket	1998
1	(Slovakia)	Dagmar Hutková, Silvia Janostinova, Zuzana Polónyiová;	(Slovakia) Ružomberok	1999
1	(Slovakia)	Renáta Hiráková, Andrea Kuklova, Daniela Cikosova	(Slovakia) Ružomberok	2000
1	(France)	Nicole Antibe, Yacine Sene, Laëtitia Moussard, Johanna Boutet	(France) Bourges Basket	2001
1	(Australia)	Alicia Poto	(France) Bourges Basket	2001
1	(United States)	Michele Van Gorp	(France) Bourges Basket	2001
1	(France)	Marie-Frédérique Ayissi, Nathalie Lesdema, Sabine Juras, Claire Tomaszewski	(France) Valenciennes Olympic	2002
1	(Hungary)	Timea Béres	(France) Valenciennes Olympic	2002
1	(Russia)	Anna Arkhipova, Elena Baranova, Diana Goustilina, Olga Chouneikina, Elena Kuz'mina, Vera Shnyukova, Evgenya Stel'makh	(Russia) Ekaterinburg	2003
1	(United States)	Yolanda Griffith	(Russia) Ekaterinburg	2003
1	(France)	Johanne Gomis, Élodie Bertal	(France) Valenciennes Olympic	2004
1	(Australia)	Suzy Batkovic	(France) Valenciennes Olympic	2004
1	(Czech Republic)	Eva Pelikánová	(France) Valenciennes Olympic	2004
1	(United States)	Rushia Brown	(France) Valenciennes Olympic	2004
1	(Senegal)	Fatou Dieng	(France) Valenciennes Olympic	2004
1	(Russia)	Olga Naymushina, Renata Saldina	(Russia) CSKA Samara	2005
1	(United States)	DeMya Walker	(Russia) CSKA Samara	2005
1	(Czech Republic)	Petra Kulichová, Ivana Večeřová, Eva Vítečková, Gabriela Giacintova, Michala Hartigová, Romana Hejdová, Hana Machová	(Czech Republic) Gambrinus Sika Brno	2006
1	(United States)	Nykesha Sales	(Czech Republic) Gambrinus Sika Brno	2006
1	(Italy)	Francesca Zara	(Russia) Spartak Moscow	2007
1	(Poland)	Agnieszka Bibrzycka	(Russia) Spartak Moscow	2007
1	(Portugal)	Ticha Penicheiro	(Russia) Spartak Moscow	2007
1	(Serbia)	Ivanka Matić	(Russia) Spartak Moscow	2007
1	(United States)	Tamika Whitmore	(Russia) Spartak Moscow	2007
1	(Croatia)	Vedrana Grgin-Fonseca	(Russia) Spartak Moscow	2008
1	(Serbia)	Ivana Matović	(Russia) Spartak Moscow	2008
1	(United States)	Kelly Mazzante	(Russia) Spartak Moscow	2008
1	(Lithuania)	Jurgita Štreimikytė	(Russia) Spartak Moscow	2009
1	(United States)	Noel-Monique Queen	(Russia) Spartak Moscow	2009
1	(United States)	Janel McCarville	(Russia) Spartak Moscow	2010
1	(Spain)	Amaya Gastaminza, Laura Gil, Anna Montañana, Isabel Sánchez, Marta Xargay, Laura Marcos, Sandra Martínez	(Spain) CB Avenida	2011
1	(Australia)	Belinda Snell	(Spain) CB Avenida	2011
1	(Belgium)	Anke de Mondt	(Spain) CB Avenida	2011
1	(Brazil)	Érika de Souza	(Spain) CB Avenida	2011
1	(Spain)	Marlés Balart, Miriam Forasté	(Spain) Ros Casares	2012
1	(France)	Isabelle Yacoubou	(Spain) Ros Casares	2012
1	(Hungary)	Katalin Honti	(Spain) Ros Casares	2012
1	(United States)	Shay Murphy	(Spain) Ros Casares	2012
1	(Russia)	Tatiana Popova, Anna Petrakova	(Russia) Ekaterinburg	2013
1	(Poland)	Ewelina Kobryn	(Russia) Ekaterinburg	2013
1	(United States)	Candace Parker	(Russia) Ekaterinburg	2013
1	(United States) (Turkey)	Quanitra Hollingsworth	(Russia) Ekaterinburg	2013
1	(Turkey)	Ayşe Cora, Yasemen Saylar, Işıl Alben, Nevriye Yılmaz, Şebnem Kimyacıoğlu, Bahar Çağlar, Esra Şencebe	(Turkey) Galatasaray	2014
1	(Spain) (Ivory Coast)	Vanessa Ble	(Turkey) Galatasaray	2014
1	(United States)	Shavonte Zellous, Kelsey Bone	(Turkey) Galatasaray	2014
1	(Czech Republic)	Ilona Burgrová, Kateřina Elhotová, Alena Hanušová, Lenka Bartáková	(Czech Republic) USK Praha	2015
1	(United States)	Danielle Robinson, Kia Vaughn	(Czech Republic) USK Praha	2015
1	(Russia)	Kseniia Levchenko, Elena Kirillova, Tatiana Vidmer, Veronika Dorosheva, Anastasia Logunova, Viktoria Medvedeva	(Russia) Dynamo Kursk	2017
1	(France)	Héléna Ciak	(Russia) Dynamo Kursk	2017
1	(Spain)	Anna Cruz	(Russia) Dynamo Kursk	2017
1	(United States)	Angel McCoughtry, Nnemkadi Ogwumike, Epiphanny Prince	(Russia) Dynamo Kursk	2017
1	(Russia)	Elizabeta Krymova	(Russia) Ekaterinburg	2018
1	(United States) (Turkey)	LaToya Sanders	(Russia) Ekaterinburg	2018
1	(Russia)	Elizabeta Komarova	(Russia) Ekaterinburg	2019
1	(United States) (Hungary)	Allie Quigley	(Russia) Ekaterinburg	2021
1	(Russia)	Maryia Papova	(Russia) Ekaterinburg	2021
1	(Hungary)	Dalma Czukor, Zsófia Fegyverneky, Bernadett Határ, Zsuzsanna Sitku, Aliz Varga, Sara Varga	(Hungary) Sopron Basket	2022
1	(Serbia)	Jelena Brooks, Nevena Jovanović	(Hungary) Sopron Basket	2022
1	(United States)	Stefanie Dolson, Briann January	(Hungary) Sopron Basket	2022
1	(Germany)	Satou Sabally	(Turkey) Fenerbahçe	2023
1	(Ukraine)	Alina Iagupova	(Turkey) Fenerbahçe	2023
1	(Serbia)	Mina Djordjevic, Ivana Raca	(Turkey) Fenerbahçe	2023
1	(United States) (Turkey)	Kiah Stokes	(Turkey) Fenerbahçe	2023
1	(Turkey)	Elif İstanbulluoğlu, Manolya Kurtulmuş	(Turkey) Fenerbahçe	2023
1	(United States) (Serbia)	Yvonne Anderson	(Turkey) Fenerbahçe	2024
1	(France)	Marième Badiane	(Turkey) Fenerbahçe	2024
1	(Latvia)	Kitija Laksa	(Turkey) Fenerbahçe	2024
1	(United States)	Napheesa Collier	(Turkey) Fenerbahçe	2024
1	(Montenegro)	Marija Leković	(Turkey) Fenerbahçe	2024
1	(Turkey)	Duygu Ozen, Selin Gul	(Turkey) Fenerbahçe	2024
1	(France)	Valériane Ayayi	(Czech Republic) USK Praha	2025
1	(Spain)	Maite Cazorla, María Conde	(Czech Republic) USK Praha	2025
1	(Netherlands)	Emese Hof	(Czech Republic) USK Praha	2025
1	(Australia)	Eziyoda Magbegor	(Czech Republic) USK Praha	2025
1	(United States)	Brionna Jones	(Czech Republic) USK Praha	2025
1	(Czech Republic)	Gabriela Andelova, Viktorie Staflova, Mariana Pribylova, Veronika Sipova, Veronika Vorackova	(Czech Republic) USK Praha	2025
1	(Slovenia)	Teja Oblak	(Czech Republic) USK Praha	2025
1	(France)	Iliana Rupert	(Turkey) Fenerbahçe	2026
1	(Turkey)	Tuana Vural, Selen Baş, Ayşe Yilmaz, Meltem Avcı	(Turkey) Fenerbahçe	2026
1	(United States)	Teaira McCowan	(Turkey) Fenerbahçe	2026
1	(Belgium)	Julie Allemand	(Turkey) Fenerbahçe	2026

== See also ==
- List of EuroLeague Women winning coaches
