= Basketball at the 2000 Summer Olympics – Women's tournament =

15th Olympic Basketball Tournament
- Sydney 2000

Tournament details
- Olympics: 2000 Summer Olympics
- Host nation: Australia
- City: Sydney
- Duration: September 16–30, 2000

Women's tournament
- Teams: 12
Medals
Gold medalists	United States
Silver medalists	Australia
Bronze medalists	Brazil

Tournaments
← Atlanta 1996	Athens 2004 →

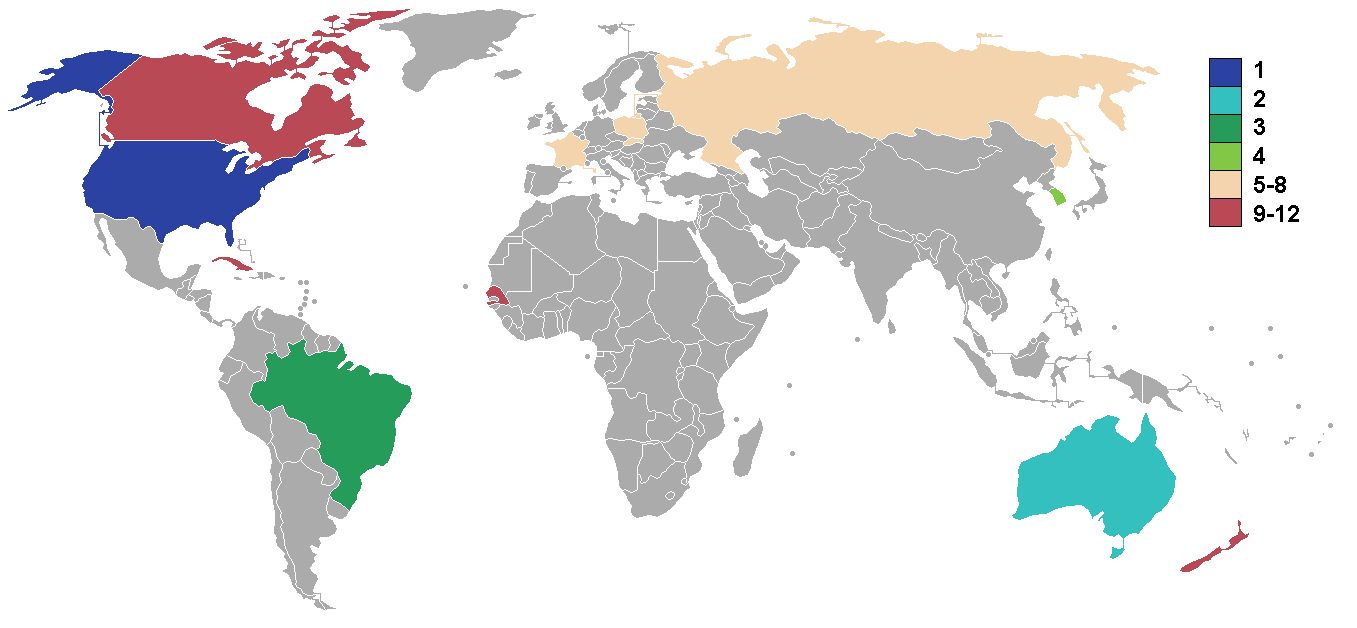
Competing teams.

The women's tournament of basketball at the 2000 Olympics at Sydney, Australia began on September 16 and ended on September 30, when the United States defeated Australia 76–54 for the gold medal. Preliminary round games were held at The Dome and elimination games at the Sydney SuperDome.

== Qualifying ==
Country	Qualified as	Date of qualification	Previous appearance
Australia	Olympics host	Sep 24, 1993	1996
United States	World champion	Jun 27, 1998	1996
South Korea	Asian champion	May 9, 1999	1996
New Zealand	Oceanian champion	Jun 4, 1999	First appearance
Senegal	African champion	Dec 20, 1997	First appearance
Brazil	Americas runner-up	May 17, 1999	1996
Cuba	Americas champion	May 17, 1999	1996
Canada	Americas third place	May 17, 1999	1996
Poland	European champion	Jun 6, 1999	First appearance
France	European runner-up	Jun 6, 1999	First Appearance
Russia	European third place	Jun 6, 1999	1996
Slovakia	European fourth place	Jun 6, 1999	First appearance

== Format ==
- Twelve teams are split into 2 preliminary round groups of 6 teams each. The top 4 teams from each group qualify for the knockout stage.
- Fifth and sixth-placed teams from each group are ranked 9th–12th in two additional matches.
- In the quarterfinals, the matchups are as follows: A1 vs. B4, A2 vs. B3, A3 vs. B2 and A4 vs. B1.
  - The eliminated teams at the quarterfinals are ranked 5th–8th in two additional matches.
- The winning teams from the quarterfinals meet in the semifinals as follows: A3/B2 vs. A1/B4 and A2/B3 vs. A4/B1.
- The winning teams from the semifinals dispute the gold medal. The losing teams dispute the bronze.

Ties are broken via the following the criteria, with the first option used first, all the way down to the last option:

1. Head to head results
2. Goal average (not the goal difference) between the tied teams
3. Goal average of the tied teams for all teams in its group

== Preliminary round ==
Qualified for the quarterfinals

The four best teams from each group advanced to the quarterfinal round.

=== Group A ===
Pos	Team	Pld	W	L	PF	PA	PD	Pts	Qualification
1	Australia (H)	5	5	0	394	274	+120	10	Quarterfinals
2	France	5	4	1	338	287	+51	9	Quarterfinals
3	Brazil	5	2	3	358	353	+5	7 (Note: Head-to-head record: Brazil 1–1 (1.12 GAvg), Slovakia 1–1 (0.97), Canada 1–1 (0.91))	Quarterfinals
4	Slovakia	5	2	3	294	282	+12	7	Quarterfinals
5	Canada	5	2	3	313	317	−4	7	
6	Senegal	5	0	5	199	383	−184	5	

Source: FIBA archive
Rules for classification: 1) points; 2) head-to-head points; 3) head-to-head goal average; 4) head-to-head number of points scored.
(H) Hosts
Notes:

16 September 2000
11:30

Boxscore

Brazil	76–60	Slovakia
Scoring by half: 35–28, 41–32
Pts: Janeth 24; Rebs: Janeth 7 Asts: Helen 7		Pts: Luptáková 22; Rebs: Godályová, Kováčová 6 Asts: Frniaková 5

The Dome, Sydney
Attendance: 5,330
Referees: Rems (SLO), Ishida (JPN)

16 September 2000
14:30

Boxscore

France	75–39	Senegal
Scoring by half: 42–21, 33–18
Pts: Antibe 13; Rebs: Fijalkowski 7 Asts: Melain 5		Pts: A. N'Diaye 11; Rebs: A. N'Diaye 7 Asts: Fall 4

The Dome, Sydney
Attendance: 8,156
Referees: Yang (CHN), Coulson (NZL)

16 September 2000
16:30

Boxscore

Canada	46–78	Australia
Scoring by half: 19–40, 27–38
Pts: Dales, Sutton-Brown 13; Rebs: Sutton-Brown 9 Asts: Bouchard, Hendry 2		Pts: Brondello, Jackson 18; Rebs: Jackson 8 Asts: Harrower 5

The Dome, Sydney
Attendance: 8,156
Referees: Gorshkov (RUS), Ziemblicki (POL)

18 September 2000
9:30

Boxscore

Senegal	41–62	Canada
Scoring by half: 19–36, 22–26
Pts: Diop 7 Rebs: Ndiaye 8 Asts: Cissé 3		Pts: Bouchard 18; Rebs: Norman 8 Asts: Boucher 3

The Dome, Sydney
Attendance: 4,315
Referees: Okhrimenko (RUS), Kim (KOR)

18 September 2000
19:30

Slovakia	51–58	France
Scoring by half: 30–33, 21–25
Pts: Kotočová 12; Rebs: Kotočová, Kováčová 7 Asts: Žirková 4		Pts: Melain 18; Rebs: Melain, Antibe 6 Asts: four players 3

The Dome, Sydney
Attendance: 8,337
Referees: Chaves (ARG), Larrea (CUB)

18 September 2000
21:30

Australia	81–70	Brazil
Scoring by half: 39–36, 42–34
Pts: Jackson 19; Rebs: three players 5 Asts: Sporn 3		Pts: Arcain 27; Rebs: Oliveira 9 Asts: Neves, Luz 3

The Dome, Sydney
Attendance: 8,337
Referees: Jungebrand (FIN), Campos (ANG)

20 September 2000
11:30

Canada	58–70	France
Scoring by half: 33–30, 25–40
Pts: Dales 17; Rebs: Norman 13; Asts: Norman 3		Pts: Melain 21; Rebs: Fijalkowski, Antibe 6 Asts: Souvre 4

The Dome, Sydney
Attendance: 5,452
Referees: Brazauskas (LTU), Battock (NZL)

20 September 2000
14:30

Brazil	82–48	Senegal
Scoring by half: 44–23, 38–25
Pts: Luz 21; Rebs: Oliveira 11; Asts: Arcain 5		Pts: Ndiaye 16; Rebs: three players 7 Asts: three players 2

The Dome, Sydney
Attendance: 8,383
Referees: Gorshkov (RUS), Larrea (CUB)

20 September 2000
21:30

Australia	70–47	Slovakia
Scoring by half: 41–19, 29–28
Pts: Jackson 15; Rebs: Fallon, Jackson 5 Asts: six players 2		Pts: Godályová 13; Rebs: Kováčová 8 Asts: Kováčová 4

The Dome, Sydney
Attendance: 8,412
Referees: Kantner (USA), Coulson (NZL)

22 September 2000
11:30

Slovakia	68–56	Canada
Scoring by half: 29–28, 39–28
Pts: Hiráková 16; Rebs: Kotočová 7 Asts: five players 2		Pts: Sutton-Brown 16; Rebs: Norman 10; Asts: Bouchard, Boucher 2

The Dome, Sydney
Attendance: 6,006
Referees: Mildenhall (AUS), Santos (BRA)

22 September 2000
14:30

France	73–70 (OT)	Brazil
Scoring by half: 31–29, 32–34 Overtime: 10–7
Pts: Souvre, Fijalkowski 18; Rebs: Melain 7 Asts: Melain, Sauret 5		Pts: Arcain 22; Rebs: Oliveira, C. Santos 8 Asts: Luz 4

The Dome, Sydney
Attendance: 8,297
Referees: Kantner (USA), Ziemblicki (POL)

22 September 2000
19:30

Senegal	39–96	Australia
Scoring by half: 18–55, 21–41
Pts: Mbengue 11; Rebs: Mbengue 7 Asts: Diakhaté 4		Pts: Boyd 15; Rebs: Whittle 8 Asts: Griffiths 5

The Dome, Sydney
Attendance: 8,426
Referees: Battock (NZL), Landeira (ESP)

24 September 2000
9:30

Senegal	32–68	Slovakia
Scoring by half: 12–27, 20–41
Pts: Ndiaye 16; Rebs: Ndiaye 10; Asts: Diakhaté 3		Pts: Žirková 18; Rebs: Hiráková 7 Asts: Frniaková 5

The Dome, Sydney
Attendance: 8,308
Referees: Figueroa (POR), Coulson (NZL)

24 September 2000
16:30

France	62–69	Australia
Scoring by half: 28–38, 34–31
Pts: Fijalkowski 24; Rebs: Fijalkowski 7 Asts: Melain 2		Pts: Brondello 18; Rebs: Jackson 12; Asts: Harrower 7

The Dome, Sydney
Attendance: 8,486
Referees: Pitsilkas (GRE), Santos (BRA)

24 September 2000
21:30

Brazil	60–61	Canada
Pts: Arcain 19; Rebs: K. Santos 7 Asts: Neves 5		Pts: Dales 16; Rebs: Dales 10; Asts: three players 3

The Dome, Sydney
Attendance: 8,471
Referees: Gillespie (AUS), Okhrimenko (RUS)

=== Group B ===
Pos	Team	Pld	W	L	PF	PA	PD	Pts	Qualification
1	United States	5	5	0	436	312	+124	10	Quarterfinals
2	Russia	5	3	2	398	325	+73	8 (Note: Head-to-head record: Russia 1–1 (1.30 GAvg), South Korea 1–1 (0.91), Poland 1–1 (0.84))	Quarterfinals
3	South Korea	5	3	2	382	367	+15	8	Quarterfinals
4	Poland	5	3	2	337	339	−2	8	Quarterfinals
5	Cuba	5	1	4	318	358	−40	6	
6	New Zealand	5	0	5	265	435	−170	5	

Source: FIBA archive
Rules for classification: 1) points; 2) head-to-head points; 3) head-to-head goal average; 4) head-to-head number of points scored.
Notes:

16 September 2000
9:30

Poland	75–52	New Zealand
Scoring by half: 43–23, 32–29
Pts: Dydek 20; Rebs: Dydek 20; Asts: Predehl, Wlaźlak 2		Pts: Ofsoski 13; Rebs: Loffhagen, Farmer 6 Asts: Walker, Farmer 2

The Dome, Sydney
Attendance: 5,330
Referees: Gillespie (AUS), Lo (SEN)

16 September 2000
19:30

Cuba	62–72	Russia
Scoring by half: 33–38, 29–34
Pts: Martínez 16; Rebs: Martínez 6 Asts: Castillo 5		Pts: Zasulskaya 18; Rebs: three players 5 Asts: Shakirova, Arkhipova 3

The Dome, Sydney
Attendance: 6,939
Referees: Thomson (CAN), Gasperin (FRA)

16 September 2000
21:30

South Korea	75–89	United States
Scoring by half: 43–53, 32–36
Pts: Jung 17; Rebs: Kim 4 Asts: Park 3		Pts: Swoopes 29; Rebs: Leslie 11; Asts: Edwards, Staley 4

The Dome, Sydney
Attendance: 6,939
Referees: Dorizon (FRA), Landeira (ESP)

18 September 2000
11:30

Russia	84–46	Poland
Scoring by half: 34–20, 50–26
Pts: Khudashova 13; Rebs: Shakirova 9 Asts: Nikonova 4		Pts: Trześniewska 10; Rebs: Dydek 8 Asts: Predehl, Wlaźlak 2

The Dome, Sydney
Attendance: 4,315
Referees: Battock (NZL), Landeira (ESP)

18 September 2000
14:30

New Zealand	62–101	South Korea
Scoring by half: 25–48, 37–53
Pts: Farmer 20; Rebs: Brunton 9 Asts: Farmer 3		Pts: Chung 16; Rebs: Jang 9 Asts: Lee M.-s., Chun 5

The Dome, Sydney
Attendance: 7,298
Referees: Degagne (CAN), Gasperin (FRA)

18 September 2000
16:30

United States	90–61	Cuba
Scoring by half: 48–42, 42–19
Pts: Smith 15; Rebs: Griffith, Williams 7 Asts: Staley 8		Pts: Martínez 19; Rebs: Martínez, León 4 Asts: Castillo 5

The Dome, Sydney
Attendance: 7,298
Referees: Sudek (SVK), Gillespie (AUS)

20 September 2000
9:30

Cuba	74–55	New Zealand
Scoring by half: 45–29, 29–26
Pts: Seino, Martínez 12; Rebs: Víctores, Seino 5 Asts: Seino, Martinez 3		Pts: Farmer 15; Rebs: Cotton 6 Asts: Brunton 3

The Dome, Sydney
Attendance: 5,452
Referees: Okhrimenko (RUS), Landeira (ESP)

20 September 2000
16:30

United States	88–77	Russia
Scoring by half: 44–47, 44–30
Pts: Leslie 18; Rebs: Griffith 11; Asts: Edwards, Swoopes 3 each		Pts: Arkhipova 15; Rebs: Zasulskaya 6 Asts: Zasulskaya 5

The Dome, Sydney
Attendance: 8,383
Referees: Pitsilkas (GRE), Campos (ARG)

20 September 2000
19:30

South Korea	62–77	Poland
Scoring by half: 38–39, 24–38
Pts: Jung 19; Rebs: Chung 7 Asts: Yang, Chung 3		Pts: Dydek 26; Rebs: Dydek 18; Asts: Wlaźlak 6

The Dome, Sydney
Attendance: 8,412
Referees: Mildenhall (AUS), Santos (BRA)

22 September 2000
9:30

Russia	73–75 (OT)	South Korea
Scoring by half: 37–34, 32–35 Overtime: 4–6
Pts: Abrosimova 17; Rebs: Khudashova 7 Asts: Abrosimova 6		Pts: Chun 22; Rebs: Cbun, Chung 4 Asts: Chung 10

The Dome, Sydney
Attendance: 6,006
Referees: Figueroa (PUR), Zancanella (ITA)

22 September 2000
16:30

New Zealand	42–93	United States
Scoring by half: 17–47, 25–46
Pts: Farmer 9 Rebs: Ofsoski 6 Asts: Farmer 3		Pts: Smith 14; Rebs: Williams 7 Asts: Bolton-Holfield 6

The Dome, Sydney
Attendance: 8,297
Referees: Thomson (CAN), Kim (KOR)

22 September 2000
21:30

Poland	72–65	Cuba
Scoring by half: 33–35, 39–30
Pts: Dydek 32; Rebs: Dydek 13; Asts: Cupryś, Dydek 5		Pts: Plutín 17; Rebs: Victores, Suero 8 Asts: Castillo 4

The Dome, Sydney
Attendance: 8,426
Referees: Degagne (CAN), Yang (CHN)

24 September 2000
11:30

New Zealand	54–92	Russia
Scoring by half: 28–41, 26–51
Pts: Ofsoski 11; Rebs: Ofsoski 5 Asts: three players 2		Pts: Rutkovskaya 19; Rebs: Khudashova 9 Asts: Abrosimova 5

The Dome, Sydney
Attendance: 8,308
Referees: Larrea (CUB), Yang (CHN)

24 September 2000
14:30

Cuba	56–69	South Korea
Scoring by half: 28–34, 28–35
Pts: Castillo 17; Rebs: Martínez 8 Asts: four players 2		Pts: Yang 17; Rebs: Jung 12; Asts: Chun 11

The Dome, Sydney
Attendance: 8,486
Referees: Kantner (USA), Jovčić (YUG)

24 September 2000
19:30

United States	76–57	Poland
Scoring by half: 44–21, 32–36
Pts: Griffith, Swoopes 16; Rebs: Griffith 12; Asts: Leslie 4		Pts: Dydek 24; Rebs: Dydek 10; Asts: Predehl 2

The Dome, Sydney
Attendance: 8,471
Referees: Gasperin (FRA), Kim (KOR)

== Classification games ==
26 September 2000
9:30

11th place

Senegal	69–72	New Zealand
Scoring by half: 39–40, 30–32
Pts: Diakhaté, A. Ndiaye 18; Rebs: Fall 9 Asts: Fall, A. Ndiaye 3		Pts: Brunton 17; Rebs: Ofsoski 7 Asts: Daly 4

The Dome, Sydney
Attendance: 8,320
Referees: Okhrimenko (RUS), Ziemblicki (POL)

26 September 2000
11:30

9th place

Canada	58–67	Cuba
Scoring by half: 34–35, 24–32
Pts: Sutton-Brown 14; Rebs: Norman, Sutton-Brown 9 Asts: Norman 4		Pts: three players 13; Rebs: Martínez 10; Asts: Castillo 2

The Dome, Sydney
Attendance: 8,320
Referees: Ishida (JPN), Gillespie (AUS)

29 September 2000
9:30

7th place

Slovakia	64–57	Poland
Scoring by half: 34–34, 30–23
Pts: Hiráková 16; Rebs: Hiráková 9 Asts: Kalistová 3		Pts: Dydek 21; Rebs: Dydek 12; Asts: Wlaźlak 4

Sydney Superdome, Sydney
Attendance: 14,260
Referees: Campos (ARG), Gasperin (BRA)

29 September 2000
11:30

5th place

France	71–59	Russia
Scoring by half: 30–27, 41–32
Pts: Sauret 17; Rebs: Fijalkowski 6 Asts: Melain 4		Pts: Nikonova 18; Rebs: three players 5 Asts: Arkhipova 4

Sydney Superdome, Sydney
Attendance: 14,260
Referees: Mildenhall (AUS), Jones (USA)

== Knockout stage ==
Quarterfinals (27 September)
A1	Australia	76
B4	Poland	48
B2	Russia	67
A3	Brazil	68
A2	France	59
B3	South Korea	68
B1	United States	58
A4	Slovakia	43

Semifinals (29 September)
A1	Australia	64
A3	Brazil	52
B3	South Korea	65
B1	United States	78

Gold medal game (30 September)
A1	Australia	54
B1	United States	76
Bronze medal game
A3	Brazil (OT)	84
B3	South Korea	73

=== Quarterfinals ===
27 September 2000
15:00

Report

Australia	76–48	Poland
Scoring by half: 43–28, 33–20
Pts: Jackson 17; Rebs: Jackson, Griffiths 9 each Asts: Harrower 5		Pts: Trześniewska, Dydek 12 each Rebs: Dydek 12; Asts: Predehl 5

The Dome, Sydney
Attendance: 14,381
Referees: Kantner (USA), Yang (CHN)

27 September 2000
17:00

Report

Russia	67–68	Brazil
Scoring by half: 39–38, 28–30
Pts: Pshikova 18; Rebs: Zasulskaya 6 Asts: Zasulskaya 5		Pts: de Oliveira 17; Rebs: Arcain 9 Asts: Neves, Luz 4 each

The Dome, Sydney
Attendance: 14,381
Referees: Jungebrand (FIN), Thomson (CAN)

27 September 2000
20:00

Report

France	59–68	South Korea
Scoring by half: 27–30, 32–38
Pts: Melain 21; Rebs: Melain 11; Asts: three players 2 each		Pts: Yang J-o 15; Rebs: Jung S-m 5 Asts: Chung E-s 5

The Dome, Sydney
Attendance: 14,605
Referees: Chaves (ARG), Gillespie (AUS)

27 September 2000
22:00

Report

United States	58–43	Slovakia
Scoring by half: 32–23, 26–20
Pts: Leslie 18; Rebs: Griffith 11; Asts: three players 3 each		Pts: Luptáková 18; Rebs: Kotočová, Luptáková 7 each Asts: Žirková 2

The Dome, Sydney
Attendance: 14,605
Referees: Gorshkov (RUS), Landeira (ESP)

=== Semifinals ===
29 September 2000
14:30

Brazil	52–64	Australia
Scoring by half: 27–36, 25–28
Pts: Arcain 21; Rebs: Oliveira 14; Asts: Arcain 4		Pts: Brondello, Jackson 16; Rebs: Jackson 9 Asts: Harrower, Griffiths 4

Sydney SuperDome, Sydney
Attendance: 14,698
Referees: Figueroa (PUR), Rems (SLO)

29 September 2000
16:30

South Korea	65–78	United States
Scoring by half: 40–42, 25–36
Pts: Park 14; Rebs: Chun 5 Asts: Chung 5		Pts: Swoopes 19; Rebs: Leslie 12; Asts: Swoopes 5

Sydney SuperDome, Sydney
Attendance: 14,698
Referees:
Romualdas Brazauskas (Lithuania)
Rick Degagne (Canada)

=== Bronze medal game ===
30 September 2000
18:00

South Korea	73–84 (OT)	Brazil
Scoring by half: 34–30, 31–35 Overtime: 8–19
Pts: Jung 23; Rebs: Yang, Jung 5 Asts: Chun 6		Pts: Arcain 28; Rebs: Oliveira 16; Asts: A. Santos 4

Sydney Superdome, Sydney
Attendance: 14,678
Referees: Gillespie (AUS), Jones (USA)

=== Gold medal game ===
30 September 2000
20:00

Australia	54–76	United States
Scoring by half: 30-43, 24-33
Pts: Jackson 20; Rebs: Jackson 13; Asts: Harrower 2		Pts: Leslie, Williams 15 each Rebs: Griffith 12; Asts: Edwards 3

Sydney SuperDome, Sydney
Attendance: 14,978
Referees:
Nikolaos Pitsilkas (Greece)
Raúl Chaves (Argentina)

== Awards ==
2000 Women's Olympic Basketball Champions

United States
Fourth title

== Final standings ==
Rank	Team	Pld	W	L
1st place, gold medalist(s)	United States	8	8	0
2nd place, silver medalist(s)	Australia	8	7	1
3rd place, bronze medalist(s)	Brazil	8	4	4
4th	South Korea	8	4	4
Eliminated at the quarterfinals
5th	France	7	5	2
6th	Russia	7	3	4
7th	Slovakia	7	3	4
8th	Poland	7	3	4
Preliminary round 5th placers
9th	Cuba	6	2	4
10th	Canada	6	2	4
Preliminary round 6th placers
11th	New Zealand	6	1	5
12th	Senegal	6	0	6
