= 1999–2000 EuroLeague Women =

Basketball competition

The 1999–2000 Euroleague Women was the fourth edition of the Euroleague era of FIBA's premier international competition for European women's basketball clubs. It ran between 22 September 1999 and 6 April 2000.

Defending champion and Final Four host MBK Ruzomberok won its second title beating former champion Bourges Basket in the final. BK Brno and Dynamo Moscow also reached the Final Four.

== Group stage ==
=== Group A ===
| # | Team | Pld | W | L | PF | PA |
|---|---|---|---|---|---|---|
| 1 | (France) Bourges | 14 | 11 | 3 | 940 | 800 |
| 2 | (Slovakia) Ruzomberok | 14 | 11 | 3 | 1104 | 838 |
| 3 | (Italy) Pool Comense | 14 | 10 | 4 | 1004 | 857 |
| 4 | (Hungary) Sopron | 14 | 8 | 6 | 926 | 975 |
| 5 | (Germany) Wuppertal | 14 | 8 | 6 | 956 | 959 |
| 6 | (Israel) Ramat HaSharon | 14 | 3 | 11 | 913 | 1041 |
| 7 | (Spain) Celta Vigo | 14 | 3 | 11 | 864 | 966 |
| 8 | (Slovenia) Ježica | 14 | 2 | 12 | 738 | 1009 |

=== Group B ===
| # | Team | Pld | W | L | PF | PA |
|---|---|---|---|---|---|---|
| 1 | (Czech Republic) Brno | 14 | 13 | 1 | 1075 | 857 |
| 2 | (Russia) Dynamo Moscow | 14 | 10 | 4 | 999 | 879 |
| 3 | (France) Valenciennes | 14 | 9 | 5 | 949 | 916 |
| 4 | (Hungary) Pécs | 14 | 8 | 6 | 893 | 850 |
| 5 | (Italy) Schio | 14 | 7 | 7 | 850 | 899 |
| 6 | (Poland) Lotos Gdynia | 14 | 7 | 7 | 943 | 973 |
| 7 | (Turkey) Fenerbahçe | 14 | 1 | 13 | 867 | 1048 |
| 8 | (Greece) Sporting Athens | 14 | 1 | 13 | 715 | 969 |

== Quarter-finals ==
| Team #1 | Agg. | Team #2 | 1st | 2nd | 3rd |
|---|---|---|---|---|---|
| Bourges (France) | 2–1 | (Hungary) Pécs | 53–60 | 49–44 | 52–41 |
| Ruzomberok (Slovakia) | 2–1 | (France) Valenciennes | 72–65 | 62–63 | 78–49 |
| Brno (Czech Republic) | 2–1 | (Hungary) Sopron | 81–66 | 67–74 | 76–43 |
| Dynamo Moscow (Russia) | 2–1 | (Italy) Pool Comense | 74–64 | 66–78 | 66–61 |

== Final four ==
- Ruzomberok, Slovakia

Semi-finals
4 April
(France) Bourges | 58
(Russia) Dynamo Moscow | 55
4 April
(Slovakia) Ruzomberok | 63
(Czech Republic) Brno | 55

Final
6 April
(France) Bourges | 64
(Slovakia) Ruzomberok | 67
Third place
6 April
(Russia) Dynamo Moscow | 66
(Czech Republic) Brno | 76

== Individual statistics ==
=== Points ===
| Rank | Name | Team | PPG |
|---|---|---|---|
| 1. | (Federal Republic of Yugoslavia) Mila Nikolić | (Israel) Ramat HaSharon | 19.1 |
| 2. | (Poland) Malgorzata Dydek | (Poland) Lotos Gdynia | 18.6 |
| 3. | (Australia) Sandy Brondello | (Germany) Wuppertal | 18.2 |
| 3. | (Russia) Natalia Zasulskaya | (Russia) Dynamo Moscow | 17.6 |
| 5. | (United States) Taj McWilliams | (Italy) Schio | 17.4 |

=== Rebounds ===
| Rank | Name | Team | PPG |
|---|---|---|---|
| 1. | (Poland) Malgorzata Dydek | (Poland) Lotos Gdynia | 10.6 |
| 2. | (Germany) Marlies Askamp | (Germany) Wuppertal | 10.0 |
| 3. | (Russia) Maria Stepanova | (Czech Republic) Brno | 9.6 |
| 4. | (Russia) Natalia Zasulskaya | (Russia) Dynamo Moscow | 9.3 |
| 5. | (United States) Taj McWilliams | (Italy) Schio | 8.1 |

=== Assists ===
| Rank | Name | Team | PPG |
|---|---|---|---|
| 1. | (Israel) Aluma Goren | (Israel) Ramat HaSharon | 4.4 |
| 2. | (Czech Republic) Romana Hamzová | (Czech Republic) Brno | 4.3 |
| 3. | (Spain) Ana Belén Álvaro | (France) Valenciennes | 3.9 |
| 3. | (France) Yannick Souvré | (France) Bourges | 3.9 |
| 5. | (Portugal) Ticha Penicheiro | (Poland) Lotos Gdynia | 3.8 |
