= Slovakia women's national basketball team =

Slovakia
- FIBA ranking: 33 ▼1 (14 September 2026)
- Joined FIBA: 1993
- FIBA zone: FIBA Europe
- National federation: SBA
- Coach: Juraj Suja
- Nickname: Repre

Olympic Games
- Appearances: 1

World Cup
- Appearances: 2

EuroBasket
- Appearances: 13
- Medals: (silver) Silver: (1997); (bronze) Bronze: (1993)
Home	Away

The Slovakia women's national basketball team (Slovak: Slovenské národné basketbalové družstvo žien) represents Slovakia in international women's basketball, and is run by the Slovak Basketball Association. Slovakia are one of the newest national basketball teams in the world, having split from Czechoslovakia after the dissolution of the unified state in 1993, with both teams continuing as the successor state of Czechoslovakia.

== History ==
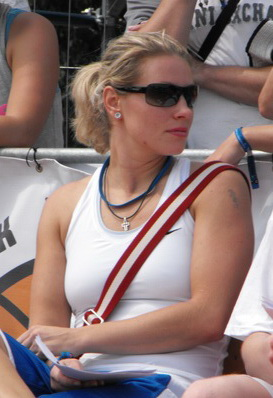
Zuzana Žirková, one of the best Slovak basketball players in history and country top-scorer at Eurobasket Women with 490 points

Before 1993, Slovak players represented Czechoslovakia. When Slovakia became independent, it became the successor state to the Czechoslovakia and, therefore, the results of previous state rightfully belong to it.

In the 1990s, the Slovaks were the most successful women's basketball team in Europe, and thanks to that they became the most successful team sport in the country. This position was confirmed at the 1994 Women's Basketball World Cup, where they placed fifth; at the 1998 Women's Basketball World Cup, they were eighth.

The team won a bronze medal during the 1993 European Championship and a silver medal during the 1997 European Championship.

The only Olympic start in the Sydney 2000 was marked by the resignation of the implementation team led by Natália Hejková before the Olympics after disagreements with the leadership of the SBA.

After 2001, there was a withdrawal from the positions, which culminated in non – participation in the EuroBasket Women 2005 and EuroBasket Women 2007. The biggest successes of the last period is 8th place from the European Championships 2009 and 2017.

In the qualification for EuroBasket Women 2019, the team did not succeed and finished in third place in the group. Following the failure, the national team coach Peter Kováčik resigned and was replaced from February 2019 by Juraj Suja.

After the victory over Netherlands on 6 February 2021 in Piešťany 61:50, Slovaks won qualification group H and advanced to EuroBasket Women 2021.

Slovakia qualified for EuroBasket Women 2023 after finishing second in the Group H. At the Eurobasket, Slovaks won one game in the Group phase and advanced to Quarterfinals qualification where they lost against Germany and finished in 12th place.

== Competitive record ==
=== Olympic Games ===
Olympic Games
Year	Position	Pld	W	L
(United States) 1996	Did not qualify			
(Australia) 2000	7th	7	3	4
(Greece) 2004	Did not qualify			
(China) 2008	Did not qualify			
(United Kingdom) 2012	Did not qualify			
(Brazil) 2016	Did not qualify			
(Japan) 2020	Did not qualify			
(France) 2024	Did not qualify			
(United States) 2028	To be determined			
Total		7	3	4

=== FIBA Women's World Cup ===
Women's World Cup
Year	Position	Pld	W	L
(Australia) 1994	5th	8	6	2
(Germany) 1998	8th	9	3	6
(China) 2002	Did not qualify			
(Brazil) 2006	Did not qualify			
(Czech Republic) 2010	Did not qualify			
(Turkey) 2014	Did not qualify			
(Spain) 2018	Did not qualify			
(Australia) 2022	Did not qualify			
(Germany) 2026	Did not qualify			
(Japan) 2030	To be determined			
Total		17	9	8

=== EuroBasket Women ===
EuroBasket Women					Qualification		
Year	Position	Pld	W	L	Pld	W	L
(Italy) 1993	Bronze medal	5	3	2	Qualified as Czechoslovakia		
(Czech Republic) 1995	4th	9	6	3	5	5	0
(Hungary) 1997	Silver medal	8	6	2	5	5	0
(Poland) 1999	4th	8	3	5	Qualified as Eurobasket 97 Finalist		
(France) 2001	8th	8	2	6	6	6	0
(Greece) 2003	7th	8	4	4	6	6	0
(Turkey) 2005	Did not qualify				12	7	5
(Italy) 2007	Did not qualify				10	6	4
(Latvia) 2009	8th	9	4	5	8	5	3
(Poland) 2011	13th	3	1	2	6	3	3
(France) 2013	12th	6	1	5	8	7	1
(Hungary) (Romania) 2015	9th	7	3	4	6	5	1
(Czech Republic) 2017	8th	7	2	5	6	4	2
(Serbia) (Latvia) 2019	Did not qualify				6	4	2
(France) (Spain) 2021	13th	3	1	2	4	2	2
(Slovenia) (Israel) 2023	12th	4	1	3	6	4	2
(Czech Republic) (Germany) (Italy) (Greece) 2025	Did not qualify				6	4	2
(Belgium) (Finland) (Sweden) (Lithuania) 2027	To be determined						
Total		85	37	48	95	68	27

== Team ==
=== Current roster ===
Roster for the EuroBasket Women 2023.

Slovakia women's national basketball team roster
Players
Coaches

Pos.	No.	Name	Age – Date of birth	Height	Club	Ctr.
C	3	Ivana Jakubcová	28 – 20 August 1994	1.97 m (6 ft 6 in)	Angers UFAB 49	(France)
PG	5	Radka Stašová	26 – 14 May 1997	1.69 m (5 ft 7 in)	Al-Qazeres	(Spain)
SF	7	Stella Tarkovičová	23 – 16 July 1999	1.81 m (5 ft 11 in)	GiroLive Panthers Osnabrück	(Germany)
SF	9	Terézia Páleníková	27 – 16 August 1995	1.78 m (5 ft 10 in)	Uni Girona CB	(Spain)
PF	11	Sabína Oroszová	30 – 5 June 1993	1.92 m (6 ft 4 in)	Slávia Banská Bystrica	(Slovakia)
C	16	Alica Moravčíková	28 – 5 December 1994	1.90 m (6 ft 3 in)	Piešťanské Čajky	(Slovakia)
SG	17	Alexandra Buknová	23 – 28 October 1999	1.77 m (5 ft 10 in)	MBK Ružomberok	(Slovakia)
PF	34	Tereza Sedláková	26 – 30 May 1997	1.86 m (6 ft 1 in)	CD Talent	(Spain)
G	38	Miroslava Mištinová	26 – 2 June 1997	1.83 m (6 ft 0 in)	CTL Zagłębie Sosnowiec	(Poland)
PG	41	Barbora Wrzesiński (C)	28 – 15 December 1994	1.79 m (5 ft 10 in)	Arka Gdynia	(Poland)
PG	77	Nikola Dudášová	28 – 17 March 1995	1.78 m (5 ft 10 in)	KSC Szekszárd	(Hungary)
SG	88	Natália Martišková	23 – 24 June 1999	1.70 m (5 ft 7 in)	Slávia Banská Bystrica	(Slovakia)

Head coach

- (Slovakia) Juraj Suja

Assistant coach(es)

- (Slovakia) Peter Jankovič
- (Slovakia) Miloslav Michálik

Legend

- (C) Team captain
- Club – describes last
  club before the tournament
- Age – describes age
  on 15 June 2023

=== Head coaches ===
- (Slovakia) Marián Matyáš – (1993–1995)
- (Slovakia) Tibor Vasiľko – (1996–1997)
- (Slovakia) Natália Hejková – (1998 – 15 July 2000)
- (Slovakia) Ľubomír Doušek – (2000)
- (Slovakia) Marián Matyáš – (2001 – October 2001)
- (Slovakia) Peter Kováčik – (October 2001 – 2003)
- (Slovakia) Maroš Guzikiewicz – (2004)
- (Slovakia) Jozef Rešetár – (2004–2005)
- (Slovakia) Vladimír Karnay – (2006–2007)
- (United States) Pokey Chatman – (2008–2010)
- (Slovakia) Natália Hejková – (2011)
- (Slovakia) Ivan Vojtko – (5 March 2012 – 30 September 2013)
- (Slovakia) Maroš Kováčik – (30 September 2013 – 27 April 2017)
- (Czech Republic) Marián Svoboda – (27 April 2017 – 26 October 2017)
- (Slovakia) Peter Kováčik – (27 October 2017 – November 2018)
- (Slovakia) Juraj Suja – (22 February 2019 – present)

== See also ==
- Slovakia women's national under-20 basketball team
- Slovakia women's national under-18 basketball team
- Slovakia women's national under-16 basketball team
