= Natália Hejková =

Slovak basketball player and coach

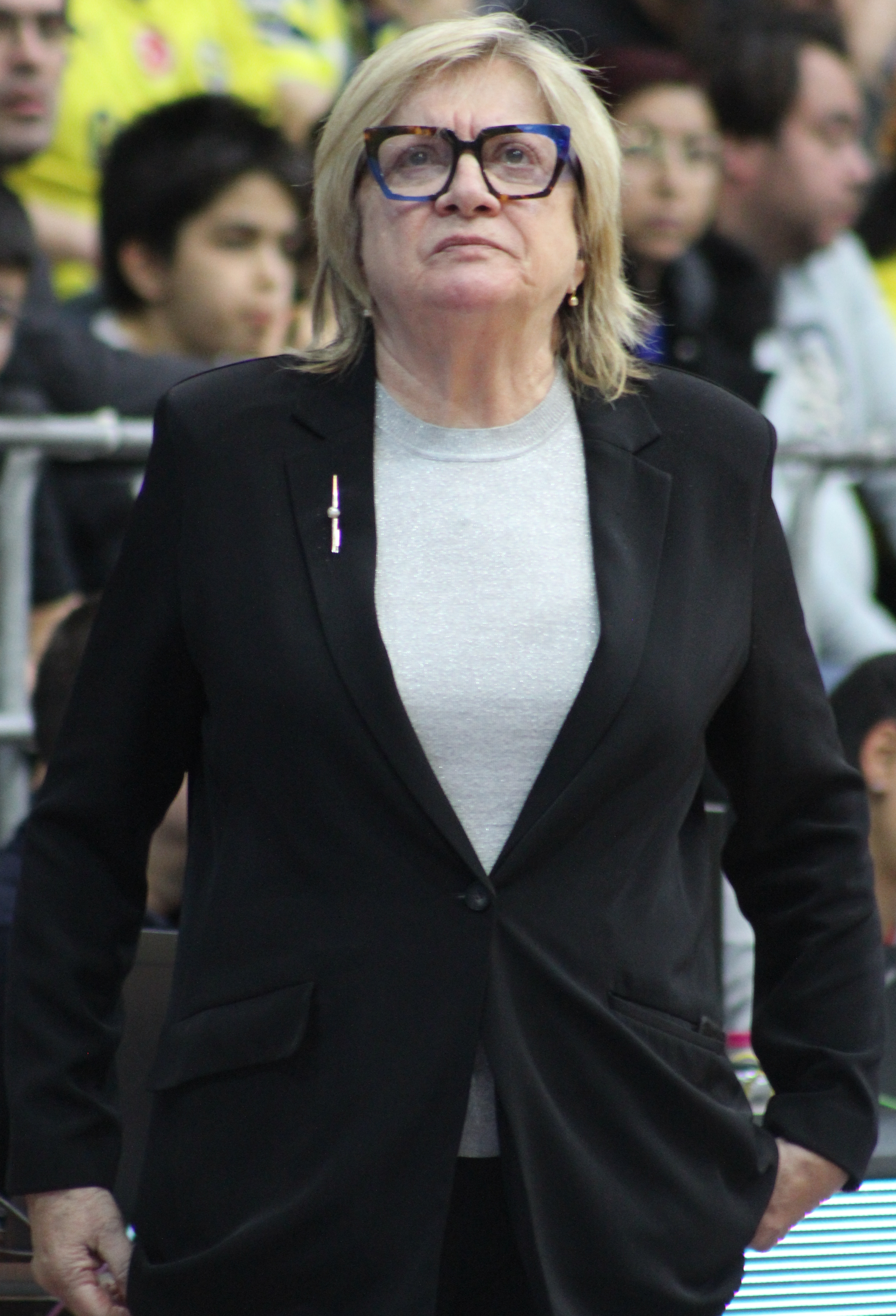

Personal information
- Born: 7 April 1954 (age 72) Žilina, Czechoslovakia

Career information
- Playing career: 1976–1986
- Coaching career: 1987–2025

Career history

Coaching
- 1987–2003: SCP Ružomberok
- 1998–2000: Slovakia
- 2003–2006: MKB-Euroleasing Sopron
- 2006–2008: Spartak Moscow
- 2006–2008: Russia (assistant)
- 2008–2009: Dynamo Moscow
- 2011: Slovakia
- 2011: Ros Casares Valencia
- 2012–2025: ZVVZ USK Praha

Career highlights
- As head coach: European Triple Crown winner (2015); 6× EuroLeague Women champion (1999, 2000, 2007, 2008, 2015, 2025); SuperCup Women winner (2015); 13x Czech League champion (2013–2025); 10× Slovak Extraliga champion (1994–2003); 3× Czechoslovak League champion (1991–1993); 2x Russian League champion (2007, 2008); 3x Czech Cup winner (2014, 2015, 2021); Slovak Cup winner (1997)

Natália Hejková (born 7 April 1954) is a former Slovak basketball coach and player. In 2019 she was inducted in the FIBA Hall of Fame.

== Biography ==
Hejková was born on 7 April 1954 to Vsevolod Hejk, a Russian-Czech engineer, who was posted to Slovakia to oversee road construction and a Slovak schoolteacher Mária Hejková (née Buciková). She was born and raised in Žilina, where she started playing basketball at the age of 14.

Hejková is single and childless.

== Playing career ==
In 1972, following her high school graduation, Hejková started to study law at the Charles University in Prague. During her studies, she played for the university basketball team Slávia VŠ Praha. Following her graduation in 1979, she joined the team TJ SCP Ružomberok, where she remained until her retirement in 1986.

== Coaching career ==
Following the end of her playing career, Hejková was offered to become the head coach of TJ SCP Ružomberok, which was going through a rough time, as a temporary emergency measure. She stayed in the position from 1987 to 2003, winning Slovak title ten times in a row as well as two European Championships.

Following her departure from Ružomberok, she coached Sopron Basket, WBC Sparta&K, which won 2 Russian Premier League Championship with Hejková as the head coach, MBC Dynamo Moscow and Ros Casares Godella.

In 2012 she returned to Prague to become the head coach of USK Praha. Under Hejková, the team won the national title ten times and achieved a record of 256 games without defeat in the row. The team also achieved two EuroLeague titles under her leadership, those being in 2015 and also 10 years later in 2025. Following the 2025 EuroLeague victory, she ended her coaching career at the age of 71.

She also coached Slovak and Russian National Women's Team.

== Recognition ==
In 1998 Hejková received the Order of Ľudovít Štúr, 3rd class from the president Michal Kováč. In 2019 she was inducted in the FIBA Hall of Fame.
