= 2024–25 Central Europe Women's League =

European women's basketball tournament

Central Europe Women's League
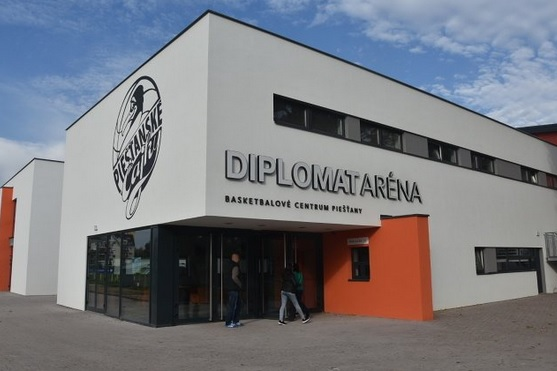
- The final four was held at the Diplomat Arena in Piešťany, Slovakia.
- Season: 2024–25
- Dates: Regular season: 27 September 2024 – 23 February 2025; Final four: 8–9 March 2025
- Games played: 32
- Teams: Total: 8 (from 4 countries)

Finals
- Champions: (Slovakia) Piešťanské Čajky (2nd title)
- Runners-up: (Czech Republic) SBŠ Ostrava
- Third place: (Czech Republic) Sokol Hradec Králové
- Fourth place: (Slovakia) MBK Ružomberok
- Finals MVP: (United States) Ke'Shunan James

Records
- Highest scoring: SBŠ Ostrava 86–78 Sokol Hradec Králové (8 March 2025)

The 2024–25 Central Europe Women's League is the 22nd season of this competition for the top women's teams in the Central Europe. This competition comes back after a five year absence.

Piešťanské Čajky are the defending champions.

The winners were Piešťanské Čajky who defended their crown by defeating SBŠ Ostrava, in the final to secure their second title.

== Format ==
- Regular season

The eight teams all played in a round robin system. The teams were played in three separate tournaments. The top four qualifies for the Final four.

- Final four

The four remaining teams advanced to the Final four to decide the champions. The Final four consisted of two semifinals, a third place game and the final.

== Teams ==
Location of teams in the 2024–25 Central Europe Women's League

The labels in the parentheses show how each team qualified for the place of its starting round:

- 1st, 2nd, 3rd, etc.: League position of the previous season

Regular season
(Austria) UBI Graz (2nd)
(Czech Republic) Sokol Hradec Králové (4th)
(Czech Republic) SBŠ Ostrava (7th)
(Czech Republic) DSK Brandýs nad Labem (8th)
(Slovakia) Piešťanské Čajky (1st)
(Slovakia) Slavia Banská Bystrica (2nd)
(Slovakia) MBK Ružomberok (3rd)
(Slovenia) Triglav Kranj (2nd)

== Regular season ==
Pos	Team	Pld	W	L	PF	PA	PD	Pts	Qualification	PIE	OST	SOK	RUZ	BRA	BAN	TRI	GRAZ
1	(Slovakia) Piešťanské Čajky	7	7	0	561	350	+211	14	Final four			77–56	59–52	88–71	72–53	78–28	
2	(Czech Republic) SBŠ Ostrava	7	6	1	479	427	+52	13	Final four	39–84					74–70		70–52
3	(Czech Republic) Sokol Hradec Králové	7	5	2	494	429	+65	12	Final four		54–72			89–51			76–66
4	(Slovakia) MBK Ružomberok	7	3	4	433	425	+8	10 (Note: MBK Ružomberok 74–67 DSK Brandýs nad Labem)	Final four		61–66	44–57			77–71		70–43
5	(Czech Republic) DSK Brandýs nad Labem	7	3	4	494	518	−24	10			47–88		67–74			89–58	
6	(Slovakia) Slavia Banská Bystrica	7	2	5	467	473	−6	9 (Note: Slavia Banská Bystrica 68–53 Triglav Kranj)				54–76		69–73		68–53	
7	(Slovenia) Triglav Kranj	7	2	5	391	505	−114	9			59–70	65–86	62–55				66–59
8	(Austria) UBI Graz	7	0	7	371	563	−192	7		51–103				52–96	48–82		

Source: CEWL
Rules for classification: 1) Points; 2) Points difference; 3) Points scored.

== Final four ==
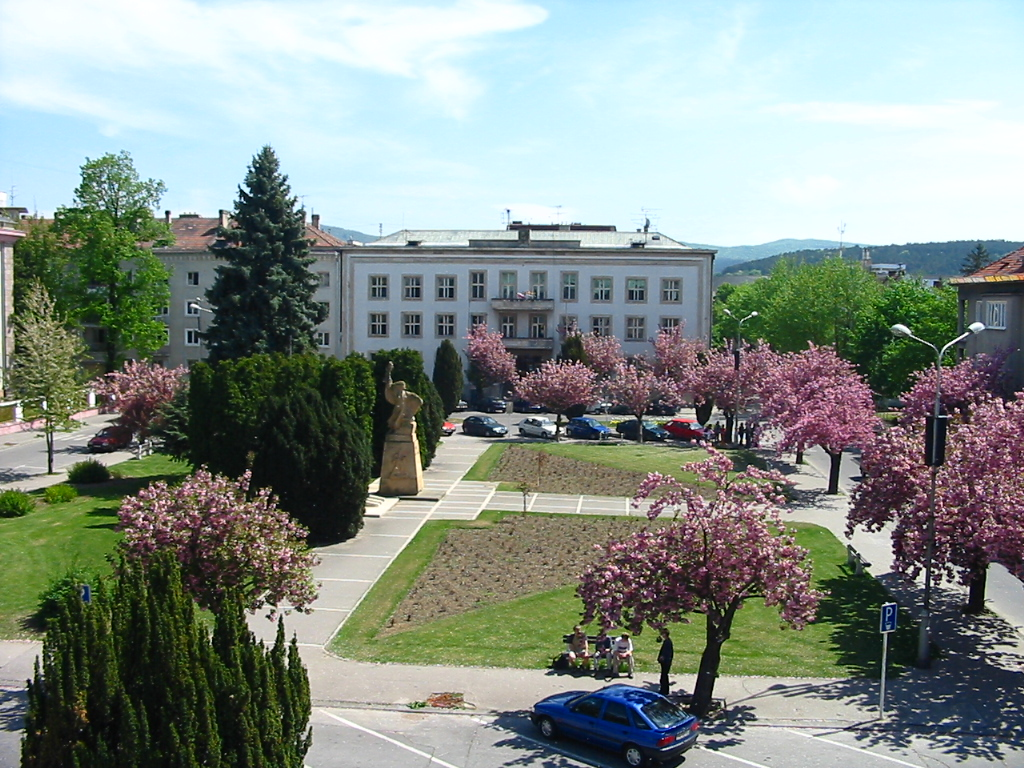
The Diplomat Arena in Piešťany hosted the final four.

The Final four hosting rights were given to Piešťanské Čajky. The event was held at the Diplomat Arena in Piešťany, Slovakia.

=== Bracket ===
Semifinals
(Slovakia) Piešťanské Čajky	87
(Slovakia) MBK Ružomberok	65
(Czech Republic) SBŠ Ostrava	86
(Czech Republic) DSK Brandýs nad Labem	78

Final
(Slovakia) Piešťanské Čajky	81
(Czech Republic) SBŠ Ostrava	69
Third place
(Slovakia) MBK Ružomberok	60
(Czech Republic) DSK Brandýs nad Labem	82

=== Semifinals ===
8 March 2025
15:30

Boxscore

SBŠ Ostrava (Czech Republic)	86–78	(Czech Republic) Sokol Hradec Králové
Scoring by quarter: 29–26, 24–14, 13–16, 20–22
Pts: Squires 20; Rebs: Beloševič 8 Asts: Válková 4		Pts: Martišková 18; Rebs: Vydrová 7 Asts: Žílová 8

Diplomat Arena, Piešťany
Attendance: 50

8 March 2025
18:00

Boxscore

Piešťanské Čajky (Slovakia)	87–65	(Slovakia) MBK Ružomberok
Scoring by quarter: 18–13, 21–24, 26–15, 22–13
Pts: James 34; Rebs: James 7 Asts: Mitrasinović 6		Pts: Kaliuzhna 19; Rebs: Štefančová, Yatskovets 8 Asts: Ďuratná, Urbanová 3

Diplomat Arena, Piešťany
Attendance: 450

=== Third place game ===
9 March 2025
13:30

Boxscore

MBK Ružomberok (Slovakia)	60–82	(Czech Republic) Sokol Hradec Králové
Scoring by quarter: 10–22, 19–29, 10–14, 21–17
Pts: Yatskovets 20; Rebs: Yatskovets 8 Asts: Jarošová, Kraislová 3		Pts: Hálová 19; Rebs: Hálová, Vydrová 7 Asts: Martišková 6

Diplomat Arena, Piešťany

=== Final ===
9 March 2025
16:00

Boxscore

Piešťanské Čajky (Slovakia)	81–69	(Czech Republic) SBŠ Ostrava
Scoring by quarter: 25–19, 27–13, 15–19, 14–18
Pts: James 24; Rebs: James, Igbokwe 10; Asts: Mitrasinović 7		Pts: Vacková 16; Rebs: Vacková 16; Asts: Kováčiková 3

Diplomat Arena, Piešťany
Attendance: 462

2024–25 Central Europe Women's League Champions

Piešťanské Čajky
Second title

== Awards ==
=== CEWL Final Four MVP ===
Player	Team	Ref.
(United States) Ke'Shunan James	(Slovakia) Piešťanské Čajky	

=== CEWL Player Of The Year ===
Player	Team	Ref.
(United States) Ke'Shunan James	(Slovakia) Piešťanské Čajky	

=== CEWL Forward Of The Year ===
Player	Team	Ref.
(United States) Ke'Shunan James	(Slovakia) Piešťanské Čajky	

=== CEWL Guard Of The Year ===
Player	Team	Ref.
(North Macedonia) Andželika Mitrasinović	(Slovakia) Piešťanské Čajky	

=== CEWL Center Of The Year ===
Player	Team	Ref.
(Czech Republic) Eliška Hálová	(Czech Republic) Sokol Hradec Králové	
