= MBK Ružomberok =

Slovak basketball team

- Leagues: Slovak Extraliga; EuroCup Women
- Founded: 1941; 85 years ago
- History: SCP Ružomberok (1979–2003); Sipox Ružomberok (1994–1996); MŠK Ružomberok (2003–present)
- Arena: Koniareň Sport Hall (capacity 4,500)
- Location: Ružomberok, Slovakia
- Team colors: Orange and white
- President: (Slovakia) Michal Slašťan
- Head coach: (Slovakia) Juraj Suja
- Team captain: (Slovakia) Alexandra Buknová
- Championships: Slovak League (15); Slovak Cup (4); Czechoslovak League (3); Euroleague (2); FIBA Eurocup (2)
- Website: www.mbkruzomberok.sk
Home	Away

MBK Ružomberok is a women's basketball club in Ružomberok, Slovakia. It was established in 1941 and plays in the elite leagues since 1979 (then in Czechoslovakia). It is the most successful female basketball team in Slovak history. It won three Czechoslovak and 15 Slovak league titles and two EuroLeague Women titles in 1999 and 2000 when Natália Hejková was with the team as its manager (trainer).

== Winners ==
- EuroLeague Women (2): 1999, 2000.
- Slovak Women's Basketball Extraliga (15): 1993-2003, 2019-2021, 2026.
- Slovak Women's Basketball Cup (2): 1997, 2019, 2020, 2022.
- Czechoslovak Women's Basketball Championship (3): 1991-1993.

== Current roster ==
MBK Ružomberok roster
Players
Coaches

Pos.	No.	Nat.	Name	Ht.	Age
SF	1	(Slovakia)	Jarošová, Kamila	1.76 m (5 ft 9 in)	23 – 6 March 2003
PG	3	(Slovakia)	Ďuratná, Danica	1.63 m (5 ft 4 in)	19 – 4 November 2006
C	5	(Slovakia)	Mikovčáková, Diana	1.85 m (6 ft 1 in)	25 – 16 August 2000
F	7	(Slovakia)	Škvareková, Eva	1.75 m (5 ft 9 in)	25 – 17 January 2001
PF	8	(Slovakia)	Hadačová, Lucia	1.85 m (6 ft 1 in)	30 – 3 August 1995
SG	10	(Slovakia)	Michaličková, Štefánia		19 – 4 May 2007
G/F	11	(Slovakia)	Buknová, Alexandra (C)	1.77 m (5 ft 10 in)	26 – 28 October 1999
CG	13	(Slovakia)	Urbanová, Dominika	1.72 m (5 ft 8 in)	26 – 1 May 2000
SG	15	(Slovakia)	Štefančová, Mária		19 – 25 September 2006
	18	(Slovakia)	Oravcová, Nina		20 – 3 March 2006
C	23	(Ukraine)	Yatskovets, Olha	1.88 m (6 ft 2 in)	28 – 16 October 1997
CG	33	(Slovakia)	Havranová, Viktória	1.78 m (5 ft 10 in)	28 – 29 April 1998
PG	44	(Czech Republic)	Andělová, Andrea	1.71 m (5 ft 7 in)	28 – 10 July 1997
PF	88	(Slovakia)	Kaliuzhna, Anna	1.81 m (5 ft 11 in)	23 – 4 June 2002

Head coach

- (Slovakia) Juraj Suja

Legend

- (C) Team captain
- Injured

- Roster
Updated: 2023-11-27

== Notable players ==
Note: Flags indicate national team eligibility at FIBA-sanctioned events. Players may hold other non-FIBA nationalities not displayed.

Criteria

To appear in this section a player must have either:

- Set a club record or won an individual award while at the club
- Played at least one official international match for their national team at any time
- Played at least one official NBA match at any time.

- (Slovakia) Eva Antalecová
- (Slovakia) Iveta Bieliková
- (Serbia) Gordana Bogojević
- (Slovakia) Zuzana Brezániová
- (Slovakia) Veronika Černáková
- (Slovakia) Daniela Číkošová
- (United States) Aaryn Ellenberg-Wiley
- (Slovakia) Mária Felixová
- (Slovakia) Slávka Frniaková
- (Slovakia) Barbora Garbová
- (Slovakia) Martina Godályová
- (Slovakia) Natália Hejková
- (Slovakia) Renáta Hiráková
- (Slovakia) Dagmar Huťková
- (Slovakia) Adriana Chamajová
- (Slovakia) Silvia Janoštinová
- (Slovakia) Ľubica Jonisová
- (Lithuania) Ingrida Jonkutė
- (Russia) Elena Karpova
- (Slovakia) Alena Kováčová
- (Slovakia) Andrea Kuklová
- (Lithuania) Dalia Kurtinaitienė
- (Slovakia) Lucia Lásková
- (Slovakia) Zdena Látalová
- (Slovakia) Lívia Libičová
- (Slovakia) Klaudia Lukačovičová
- (Serbia) Lara Mandić
- (Slovakia) Janka Minčíková
- (Russia) Elena Mozgova
- (Canada) Lizanne Murphy
- (Brazil) Alessandra Santos de Oliveira
- (Slovakia) Regína Palušná
- (Slovakia) Michaela Pavlíčková
- (Slovakia) Zuzana Polónyiová
- (Slovakia) Milena Rázgová
- (Slovakia) Veronika Remenárová
- (Moldova) Natalia Svisceva
- (Slovakia) Zuzana Škvareková
- (Ukraine) Olha Shlakhova
- (Slovakia) Katarína Tetemondová
- (Lithuania) Vitalija Tuomaitė
- (Serbia) Sanja Veselova
- (Ukraine) Olha Yatskovets
- (Ukraine) Jelena Žirková-Marenčíková
- (Slovakia) Zuzana Žirková
