= Marián Svoboda =

Czech basketball coach

Marián Svoboda is a Czech basketball coach of the Slovak national team, which he coached at the EuroBasket Women 2017.
