= Nathalie Lesdema =

French basketball player

Medal record

Representing France

European Championships
Gold medal – first place	2001 France	Team
Silver medal – second place	1999 Poland	Team

Nathalie Lesdema (born 17 January 1973 in Fort-de-France, Martinique) is a French basketball player who played for the French women's national basketball team at the 2000 Summer Olympics. She was inducted into the French Basketball Hall of Fame in 2018.
