= Mabel Bocchi =

Italian basketball player (1953–2025)

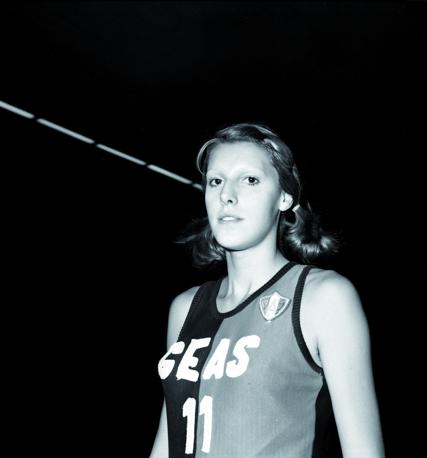
- Bocchi in 1974

Personal information
- Born: 26 May 1953 Parma, Italy
- Died: 4 December 2025 (aged 72) San Nicola Arcella, Italy

Career information
- Playing career: 1968–1982
- Position: Center

Career history
- 1968–1969: Partenio Avellino
- 1969–1978: GEAS
- 1978–1981: FIAT
- 1981–1982: B.F. Milano
Medals
Basketball
Representing Italy
EuroBasket Women
| Bronze medal – third place | 1974 Italy | Team |

Liliana Mabel Bocchi (26 May 1953 – 4 December 2025) was an Italian basketball player.

== Biography ==
Bocchi was one of the most famous Italian basketball players ever, winner of the bronze medal at the EuroBasket Women 1974.

Mabel Bocchi died in San Nicola Arcella on 4 December 2025, at the age of 72.

== See also ==
- List of members of the FIBA Hall of Fame
- Italian Basketball Hall of Fame
- List of EuroLeague Women winning players
