= Aotea College =

Location
- Okowai Road, Aotea. Porirua, New Zealand; 41.125156°S 174.854396°E

Information
- Funding type: State
- Established: 1978
- Ministry of Education Institution no.: 253
- Principal: Jason White
- Years offered: 9–13
- Gender: Co-educational
- Enrolment: 1,365 (July 2026)
- Socio-economic decile: 5M
- Website: www.aotea.school.nz

Aotea College is a state co-educational secondary school located in Porirua, New Zealand. Founded in 1978, the school serves students for Year 9 to 13 (ages 12 to 18) across the northern suburbs of Porirua.

== Demographics ==
At the September 2013 Education Review Office (ERO) review, Aotea College had 936 students enrolled, including seven international students. Forty-seven percent of students were male and 53 percent were female. Thirty-seven percent of students identified as European (Pākehā), 28 percent identified as Māori, 26 percent as Pasifika, seven percent as Asian, and two percent as another ethnicity.

As of 2026, Aotea College has an Equity Index of 441, placing it amongst schools whose students have below average socioeconomic barriers to achievement (roughly equivalent to decile 7 under the former socio-economic decile system).

== Redevelopment ==
In late 2015, it was announced that Aotea College would receive $24 million from the New Zealand Ministry of Education to fund an upgrade of the school's ageing facilities. Work was scheduled to begin in early 2017, which would see the construction of new flexible learning spaces with high standards of heating and lighting. Such an upgrade was warranted after recent storms and decades of deterioration had led to an estimated half of the college's buildings becoming leaky. Furthermore, the Te Manawa building was closed in 2015 due to the presence of black mould. These renovations were completed in late 2019 and the building was occupied from January 2020.

== Sport and cultural activities ==
Sport and cultural activities are a major part of Aotea College. Students are encouraged to take at least one winter sport and summer sport. Aotea College competes in the New Zealand National Secondary Schools Barbershop competition – in 2008, 2009, 2010, 2011, 2012, 2013, 2014, 2015, 2016, 2017 the girls' chorus won first place in both the regional and the national competition in Wellington.

== Notable alumni ==
- Tania Tupu – basketball player
- Serge Lilo – rugby union player
- Tayi Tibble – poet and writer
