= Sandra Le Dréan =

French basketball player

Medal record

Representing France

European Championships
Gold medal – first place	2001 France	Team
Silver medal – second place	1999 Poland	Team

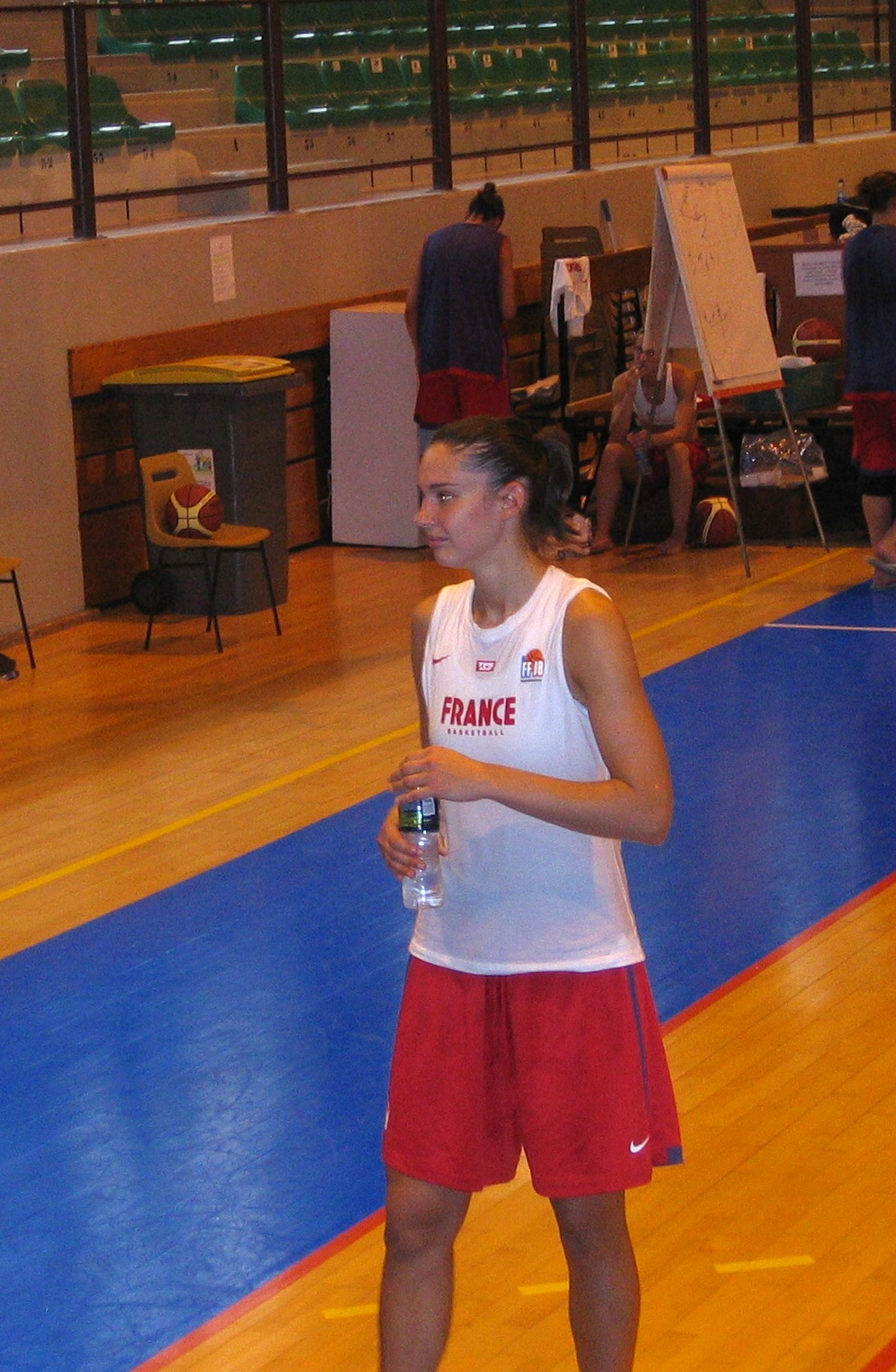
Sandra Le Dréan

Sandra Le Dréan (born 13 May 1977) is a French former basketball player who competed in the 2000 Summer Olympics. She was born in Rennes. She was inducted into the French Basketball Hall of Fame in 2015.
