= Slovak Basketball Association =

Sports governing body in Slovakia

- Founded: 1993; 33 years ago
- Affiliation: FIBA Europe
- Headquarters: Bratislava
- President: Michal Ondruš

Official website
- www.slovakbasket.sk

The Slovak Basketball Association (Slovak: Slovenská basketbalová asociácia) also known as SBA is the governing body of basketball in Slovakia. It was founded after the dissolution of Czechoslovakia in 1993. They are headquartered in Bratislava.

The Slovak Basketball Association operates the Slovakia men's national team and Slovakia women's national team. They run national competitions in Slovakia, for both the men's and women's senior teams and also the youth national basketball teams.

The top professional league in Slovakia is the Slovak Basketball League.

== See also ==
- Slovakia men's national basketball team
- Slovakia men's national under-20 basketball team
- Slovakia men's national under-18 basketball team
- Slovakia men's national under-16 basketball team
- Slovakia women's national basketball team
- Slovakia women's national under-20 basketball team
- Slovakia women's national under-18 basketball team
- Slovakia women's national under-16 basketball team
