= Tania Tupu =

New Zealand basketball player

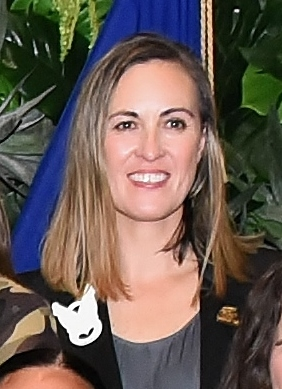
- Tupu in 2018

Personal information
- Born: Tania Maria Brunton; 28 December 1973 (age 52) Wellington, New Zealand
- Education: Aotea College
- Height: 180 cm (5 ft 11 in)
- Weight: 70 kg (154 lb)
- Spouse: Chris Tupu

Tania Maria Tupu (née Brunton; born 28 December 1973) is a New Zealand former basketball player who competed in the 2000 Summer Olympics and in the 2004 Summer Olympics. Tupu also competed for New Zealand at the 1994 World Championship held in Australia. She is married to former NBL player Chris Tupu.

As coach of the Tokomanawa Queens, Tupu guided the team to the inaugural Tauihi Basketball Aotearoa championship in 2022. She was named TBA Coach of the Year in 2025.
