= Martina Luptáková =

Slovak basketball player

Martina Luptáková (born 15 November 1977 in Lučenec) is a Slovak former basketball player who competed in the 2000 Summer Olympics.
