= Beata Predehl =

Polish basketball player

International medals

Women's basketball

Representing Poland

European Championships
Gold medal – first place	1999 Poland	Team

Beata Predehl (born 10 April 1971) is a Polish former basketball player who competed in the 2000 Summer Olympics.
