= Cal Bouchard =

Canadian former basketball player (born 1977)

Personal information
- Born: 27 November 1977 (age 48) Richmond, British Columbia, Canada
- Listed height: 173 cm (5 ft 8 in)
- Listed weight: 64 kg (141 lb)

Career information
- College: Boston College
- WNBA draft: 2000: 4th round, 60th overall pick
- Drafted by: Detroit Shock
- Position: Guard

Career highlights
- 2x First-team All-Big East (1998, 2000); Big East All-Freshman Team (1997)
- Stats at Basketball Reference

Carolin "Cal" Bouchard (born 27 November 1977) is a Canadian former basketball player who competed in the 2000 Summer Olympics.

Bouchard was born in Richmond, British Columbia.

== Career statistics ==
=== College ===
Year	Team	GP	GS	MPG	FG%	3P%	FT%	RPG	APG	SPG	BPG	TO	PPG
1996–97	Boston College	28	-	-	38.7	36.0	78.3	2.5	2.1	1.1	0.1	-	12.0
1997–98	Boston College	28	-	-	45.9	45.1	76.2	2.8	3.6	1.4	0.0	-	16.0
1998–99	Boston College	13	-	-	39.3	31.3	64.6	4.2	3.3	1.3	0.2	-	12.7
1999–00	Boston College	35	-	-	47.2	47.1	82.8	2.1	2.3	1.3	0.1	-	15.6
Career		104	-	-	43.8	42.1	77.1	2.6	2.7	1.3	0.1	-	14.4
Statistics retrieved from Sports-Reference.
