= Slovak Women's Basketball Extraliga =

- Founded: 1993; 33 years ago
- First season: 1993
- Country: Slovakia
- Confederation: FIBA Europe (Europe)
- Number of teams: 10
- Level on pyramid: 1
- Relegation to: 1. Liga
- Domestic cup: Slovak Cup
- International cup: EuroCup Women
- Current champions: MBK Ružomberok (15th title) (2025–26)
- Most championships: Young Angels Košice; MBK Ružomberok (15 titles)
- Website: www.exz.sk
- 2025–26 Slovak Women's Basketball Extraliga

Slovak Women's Basketball Extraliga (currently through sponsorship also Niké Women's Extraliga) is a tournament composed of Slovak women's basketball teams. The first draw took place in 1993. Young Angels Košice and MBK Ružomberok are the most successful teams with 15 title wins.

== Teams ==
In the season 2024/25, these following teams were playing in the Extraliga.

Clubs participating in Niké Extraliga in season 2024/25

== Champions ==
Season	Winner	Runner-up	Result
1993–94	MBK Ružomberok	Sporiteľňa Bratislava	.
1994–95	MBK Ružomberok	Spartak Myjava	.
1995–96	MBK Ružomberok	SLOVMAD Cassovia Košice	.
1996–97	MBK Ružomberok	Spartak SAM Myjava	.
1997–98	MBK Ružomberok	Slovan JOPA Bratislava	.
1998–99	MBK Ružomberok	Delta Management Košice	.
1999–00	MBK Ružomberok	UMB Banská Bystrica	.
2000–01	MBK Ružomberok	Slovan JOPA Bratislava	.
2001–02	MBK Ružomberok	Slovan JOPA Bratislava	.
2002–03	MBK Ružomberok	Delta VODS Košice	.
2003–04	Delta ICP Košice	MBK Ružomberok	.
2004–05	Delta ICP Košice	MBK Ružomberok	.
2005–06	Delta ICP Košice	MBK Ružomberok	3:2
2006–07	K CERO VODS Košice	MBK Ružomberok	3:1
2007–08	KOSIT 2013 Košice	MBK Ružomberok	3:0
2008–09	Maxima Broker Košice	MBK Ružomberok	3:0
2009–10	Good Angels Košice	BK PU Bemaco Prešov	3:0
2010–11	Good Angels Košice	MBK Ružomberok	3:0
2011–12	Good Angels Košice	MBK Ružomberok	3:0
2012–13	Good Angels Košice	MBK Ružomberok	3:2
2013–14	Good Angels Košice	MBK Ružomberok	3:1
2014–15	Good Angels Košice	Piešťanské Čajky	3:0
2015-16	Good Angels Košice	Piešťanské Čajky	3:0
2016-17	Good Angels Košice	Piešťanské Čajky	3:0
2017-18	Good Angels Košice	MBK Ružomberok	3:0
2018-19	MBK Ružomberok	Piešťanské Čajky	3:0
2019-20	MBK Ružomberok	Piešťanské Čajky	DNP (Note: Season terminated early due to the COVID-19 pandemic, three best teams in the time of the interruption were named as the season's medallists.)
2020-21	MBK Ružomberok	Piešťanské Čajky	3:2
2021-22	Piešťanské Čajky	MBK Ružomberok	3:1
2022-23	Piešťanské Čajky	Slávia Banská Bystrica	3:0
2023-24	Piešťanské Čajky	Slávia Banská Bystrica	3:0
2024-25	Piešťanské Čajky	Slávia Banská Bystrica	3:0
2025-26	MBK Ružomberok	Piešťanské Čajky	3:2
