= Renáta Hiráková =

Slovak basketball player

Personal information
- Born: 27 May 1971 (age 55) Košice, Czechoslovakia
- Listed height: 190 cm (6 ft 3 in)
- Listed weight: 78 kg (172 lb)

Renáta Hiráková (born 27 May 1971) is a Slovak former basketball player who competed in the 1992 Summer Olympics and in the 2000 Summer Olympics.

== Career ==
Hiráková was born in Košice and played club basketball for Lokomotíva Košice. At the 1992 Summer Olympics in Barcelona she was part of the Czechoslovakia team that finished sixth in the women's tournament. At the 2000 tournament in Sydney she played for Slovakia, which finished seventh.
