= Piešťanské Čajky =

- Nickname: Čajky (Seagulls)
- League: Slovak League
- Founded: 2012
- Arena: Diplomat Arena
- Capacity: 1,000
- Location: Piešťany, Slovakia
- Team colors: Blue, Yellow and White
- President: Miroslav Nerád
- Head coach: Peter Jankovič
- Championships: 2 CEWL; 2 National League; 2 National Cup
- Website: piestanskecajky.sk

Piešťanské Čajky (officially Spoločné basketbalové združenie Piešťanské Čajky) is a Slovak women's basketball club that was founded in 2012 in the city of Piešťany. Piešťanské Čajky plays in the Slovak League, the highest competition in the Slovak Republic. It is a 4-time national champion and current champion as of 2026. On the international scene, the greatest success was the runner-up of the EWBL the 2021/22 season and the win of the CEWL in the 2018/19 and 2024–25 seasons.

Since 2015, its home is Diplomat Arena. Before, the team inhabited the hall of Gymnázium Pierra de Coubertina High School in Piešťany.

== Honours ==
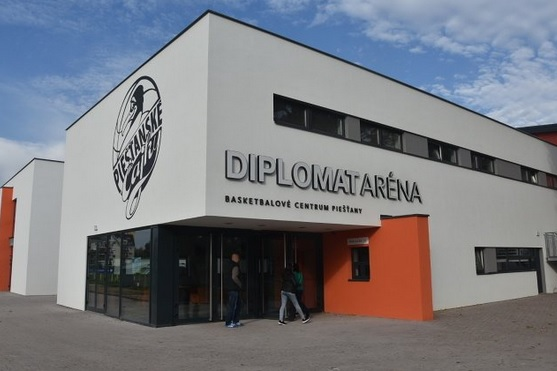
Home arena of Čajky, Diplomat Arena

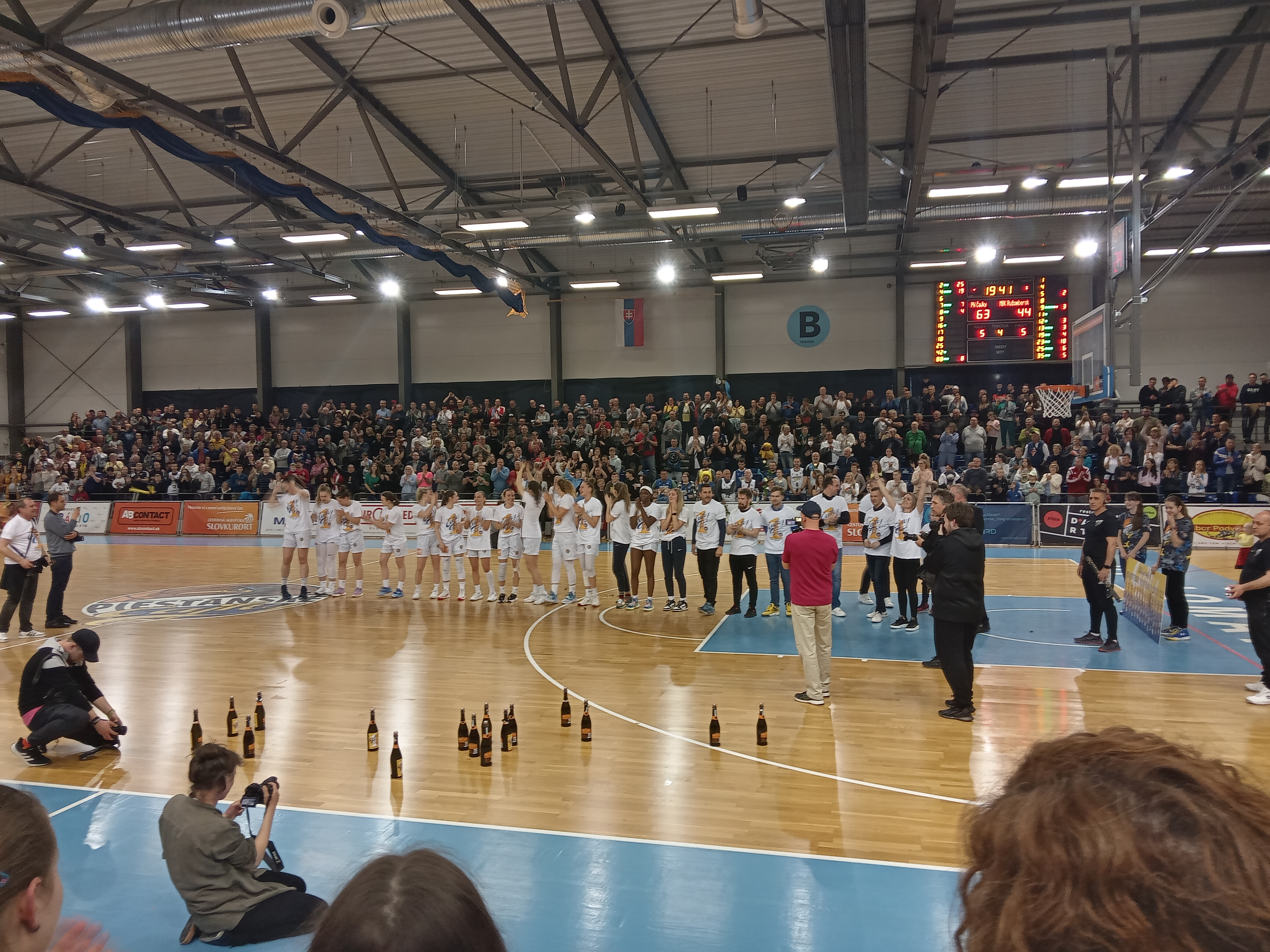
Čajky celebrate the first Slovak Extraliga title in April 2022

=== Domestic ===
National Championships – 1

- Slovak Women's Basketball Extraliga:
  - Winners (4) : 2022, 2023, 2024, 2025
  - Runner up (7) : 2015, 2016, 2017, 2019, 2020, 2021, 2026

National Cups – 2

- Slovak Women's Basketball Cup:
  - Winners (3) : 2017, 2023, 2025
  - Runner up (8) : 2014, 2016, 2018, 2019, 2020, 2021, 2022, 2024

=== International ===
- EWBL:
  - Runner up (1) : 2022
- CEWL:
  - Winners (2) : 2019, 2024–25

== Current squad ==
Piešťanské Čajky roster
Players
Coaches

Pos.	No.	Nat.	Name	Ht.	Wt.	Age
G	1	(Montenegro)	Mujović, Božica	1.78 m (5 ft 10 in)		30 – 7 January 1996
F	2	(United States)	James, Ke'Shunan	1.84 m (6 ft 0 in)		31 – 14 August 1995
F	3	(Slovakia)	Rusiňáková, Dominika	1.83 m (6 ft 0 in)		32 – 28 March 1994
PG	4	(Czech Republic)	Andělová, Gabriela	1.73 m (5 ft 8 in)		30 – 21 March 1996
G	9	(Slovakia)	Kraislová, Terézia	1.74 m (5 ft 9 in)		22 – 28 December 2003
PF	11	(Slovakia)	Taušová, Nataša	1.90 m (6 ft 3 in)		20 – 8 May 2006
C	12	(Slovakia)	Jurčenková, Anna (C)	1.96 m (6 ft 5 in)		41 – 26 July 1985
SG	14	(Slovakia)	Chovaníková, Alexandra	1.79 m (5 ft 10 in)		20 – 25 June 2006
C	16	(Slovakia)	Moravčíková, Alica	1.89 m (6 ft 2 in)		31 – 5 December 1994
SF	18	(Slovakia)	Vandlíková, Tereza	1.79 m (5 ft 10 in)		23 – 23 July 2003
F	21	(Croatia)	Mandić, Ana	1.84 m (6 ft 0 in)		25 – 9 January 2001
G	24	(Slovakia)	Valová, Magdaléna	1.74 m (5 ft 9 in)	108 kg (238 lb)	21 – 4 January 2005
SG	88	(Slovakia)	Martišková, Natália	1.70 m (5 ft 7 in)		27 – 24 June 1999

Head coach

- (Slovakia) Peter Jankovič

Assistant coach(es)

- (Slovakia) Tomáš Kačmarik

Legend

- (C) Team captain
- (DC) Dual citizenship
- Injured

- Roster
Updated: 19 October 2022

=== Notable players ===
Note: Flags indicate national team eligibility at FIBA-sanctioned events. Players may hold other non-FIBA nationalities not displayed.

Criteria

To appear in this section a player must have either:

- Set a club record or won an individual award while at the club
- Played at least one official international match for their national team at any time
- Played at least one official NBA match at any time.

- (Czech Republic) Gabriela Andělová
- (Czech Republic) Lenka Bartáková
- (Czech Republic) Kateřina Bartoňová
- (Slovakia) Nikola Dudášová
- (Slovakia) Mária Felixová
- (Sweden) Danielle Hamilton-Carter
- (Switzerland) Evita Herminjard
- (United States) Ke'Shunan James
- (Slovakia) Anna Jurčenková
- (Slovakia) Lucia Krč-Turbová
- (Croatia) Ana Mandić
- (Slovakia) Natália Martišková
- (North Macedonia) Andzelika Mitrasinović
- (Slovakia) Alica Moravčíková
- (Montenegro) Božica Mujović
- (Slovakia) Sabína Oroszová
- (Slovakia) Terézia Páleníková
- (Slovakia) Angelika Slamová
- (Slovakia) Radka Stašová
- (Croatia) Matea Tadić
- (Canada) Tamara Tatham
- (Slovakia) Nataša Taušová
- (Czech Republic) Kateřina Zohnová
