= Mbarika Fall =

Senegalese basketball player

Personal information
- Citizenship: Senegalese
- Born: December 9, 1970 (age 55) Saint-Louis, Senegal

Sport
- Sport: Basketball
- Position: Player
- Team: Senegal women's national basketball team

Mbarika Fall (born 9 December 1970 in Saint-Louis, Senegal) is a Senegalese former basketball player who competed in the 2000 Summer Olympics.
