= Sylwia Wlaźlak =

Polish basketball player

International medals

Women's basketball

Representing Poland

European Championships
Gold medal – first place	1999 Poland	Team

Sylwia Wlaźlak (born 24 March 1973 in Łódź) is a Polish former basketball player who competed in the 2000 Summer Olympics.
