= Yacine Sene =

French basketball player (born 1982)

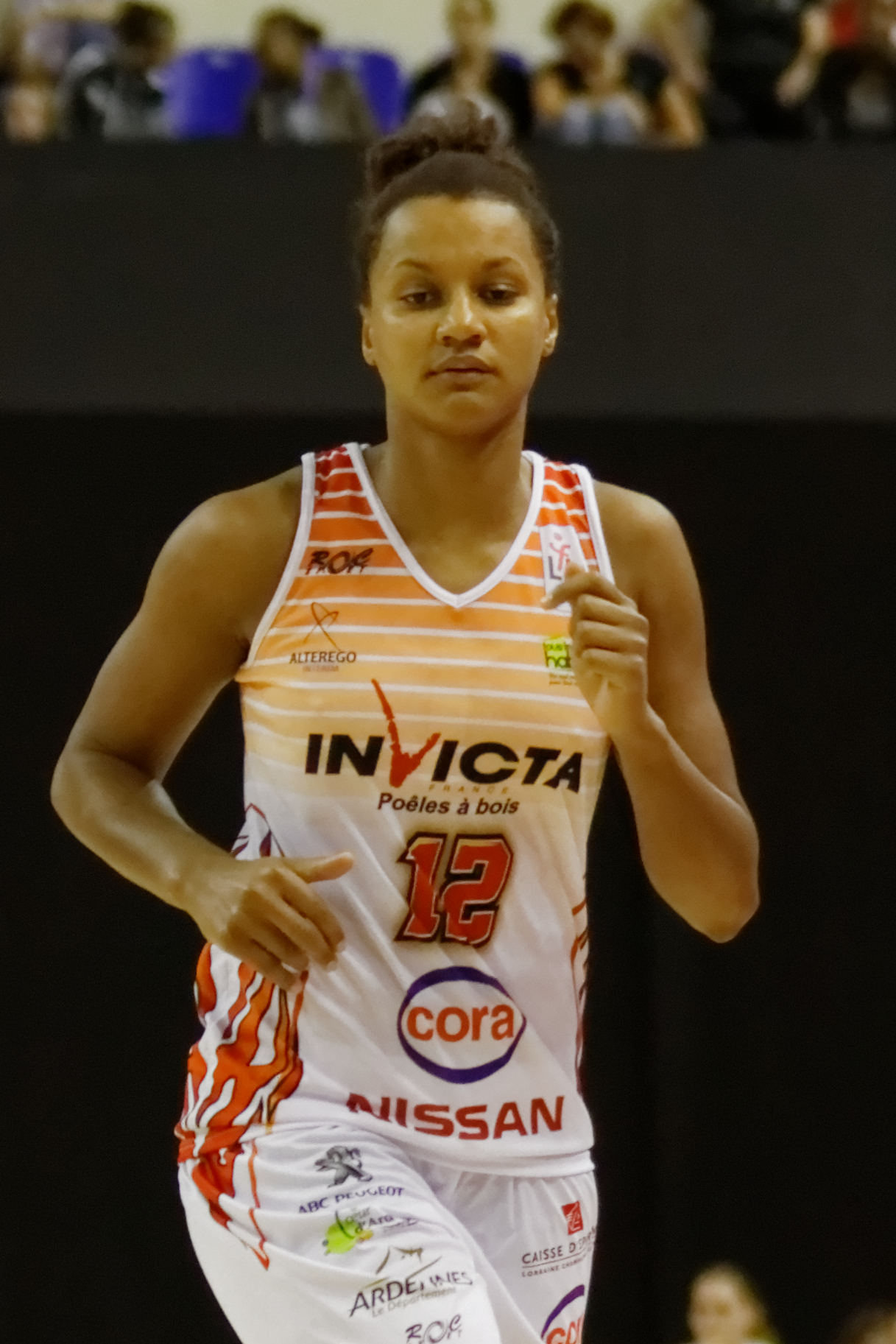
Yacine Sene

Yacine Sene (born 18 March 1982 in Orléans) is a French basketball player who played 25 times for the French women's national basketball team from 2008 to 2010.
