= Julie Ofsoski =

New Zealand basketball player

Julie Ofsoski (born 4 April 1973) is a former basketball player from New Zealand who competed in the 2000 Summer Olympics and in the 2004 Summer Olympics.
