= Dagmar Huťková =

Slovak basketball player

- Born: 20 December 1971 (age 54); Banská Bystrica, Slovakia
- Known for: Basketball, Summer Olympics 2000
- Height: 1.8 m (5 ft 11 in)

Dagmar Huťková (born 20 December 1971 in Banská Bystrica) is a Slovak former basketball player who competed in the 2000 Summer Olympics.
