= Nicole Antibe =

French basketball player

Medal record

Representing France

European Championships
Gold medal – first place	2001 France	Team
Silver medal – second place	1999 Poland	Team

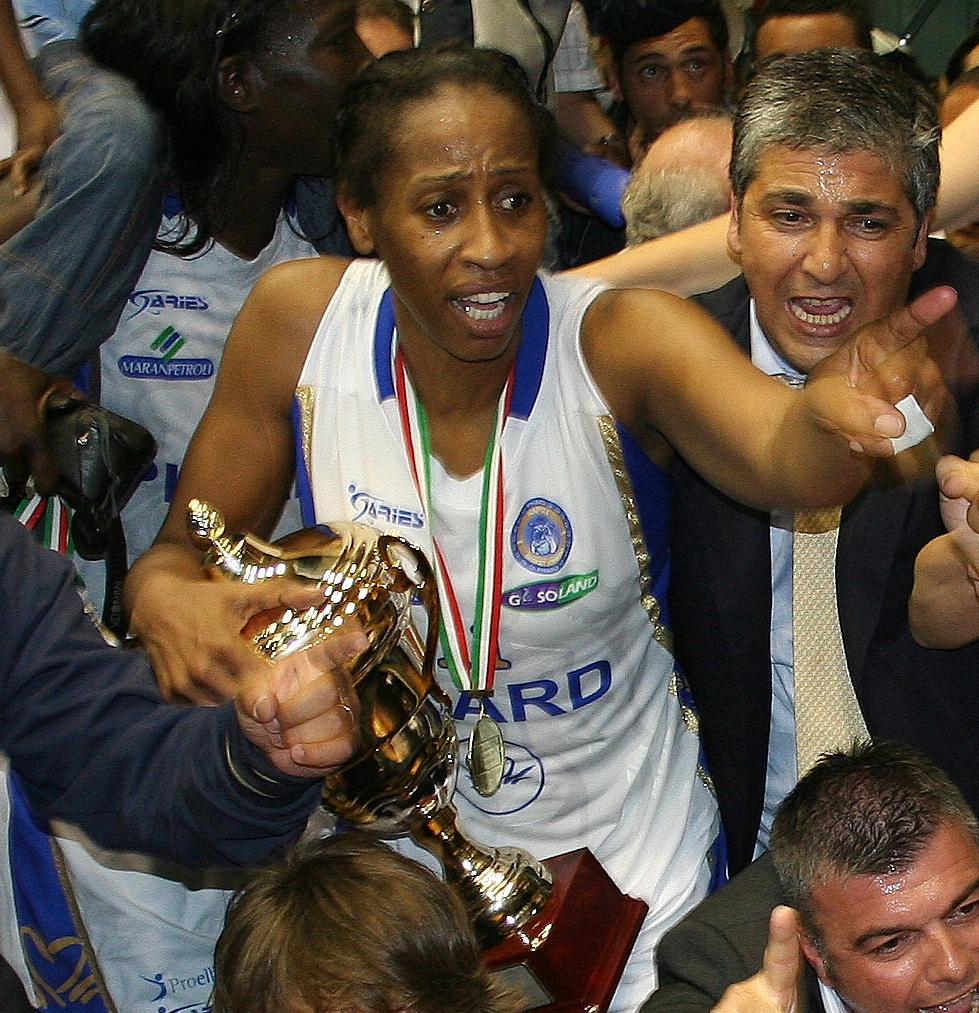

Nicole Antibe (born 11 April 1974 in Paris, France) is a French basketball player. Antibe has had 193 selections on the French national women's basketball team from 1993 to 2005. She was inducted into the French Basketball Hall of Fame in 2021.
