= Zuzana Žirková =

Slovak basketball player (born 1980)

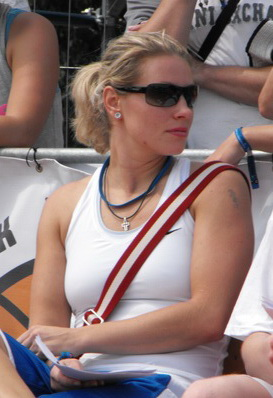

Personal information
- Born: June 6, 1980 (age 46) Bojnice, Czechoslovakia
- Listed height: 5 ft 9 in (1.75 m)
- Listed weight: 147 lb (67 kg)

Career information
- WNBA draft: 2003: 2nd round, 21st overall pick
- Drafted by: Washington Mystics
- Playing career: 1996–2018
- Position: Shooting guard
- Number: 12

Career history
- 1996–1998: Delta Košice
- 1998–2000: SCP Ružomberok
- 2000–2002: GYSEV Ringa Šopron
- 2002–2010: Gambrinus SIKA Brno
- 2003: Washington Mystics
- 2010–2011: Good Angels Košice
- 2011: UMMC Ekaterinburg
- 2011–2018: Good Angels Košice
- Stats at WNBA.com
- Stats at Basketball Reference

Zuzana Žirková (born June 6, 1980) is a Slovak basketball coach and former player. Over the course of her career, she was named Slovak basketball player of the year eight times.

== Career ==
Žirková debuted at the 1998 FIBA World Championship for Women when she was seventeen years old. She announced her retirement from Slovakia women's national basketball team in July 2011.

After playing Good Angels Košice in 2018, Žirková announced her retirement from professional basketball. Following her retirement from active playing, Žirková became a coach of the Young Angels Košice team in Slovak extraliga. In 2022, she took over coaching of Slávia Banská Bystrica in 2022.

=== Honours ===
- Slovak basketball player of the year: 2003, 2005, 2007, 2008, 2009, 2010, 2014, 2015
- Euroleague Champion: 1999, 2000, 2006
- Top Scorer FIBA Europe Under-20 Championship for Women: 2000

== Personal life ==
Žirková has one daughter named Dorota (b. 2013).

== WNBA ==
In the 2003 WNBA Draft, the Washington Mystics selected point guard Žirková with the second pick, from 21st place overall.

=== Statistics ===
Legend
GP	Games played	GS	Games started	MPG	Minutes per game	RPG	Rebounds per game
APG	Assists per game	SPG	Steals per game	BPG	Blocks per game	PPG	Points per game
TO	Turnovers per game	FG%	Field-goal percentage	3P%	3-point field-goal percentage	FT%	Free-throw percentage
**Bold**	Career best	°	League leader

=== WNBA ===
==== Regular season ====
Year	Team	GP	GS	MPG	FG%	3P%	FT%	RPG	APG	SPG	BPG	TO	PPG
2003	Washington	6	0	5.0	.500	.500	1.000	0.3	0.2	0.0	0.0	0.3	1.8
