= Alena Kováčová =

Slovak basketball player

Alena Kováčová (born 10 November 1978, in Poprad) is a Slovak former basketball player who competed in the 2000 Summer Olympics.
