= Yannick Souvré =

French basketball player

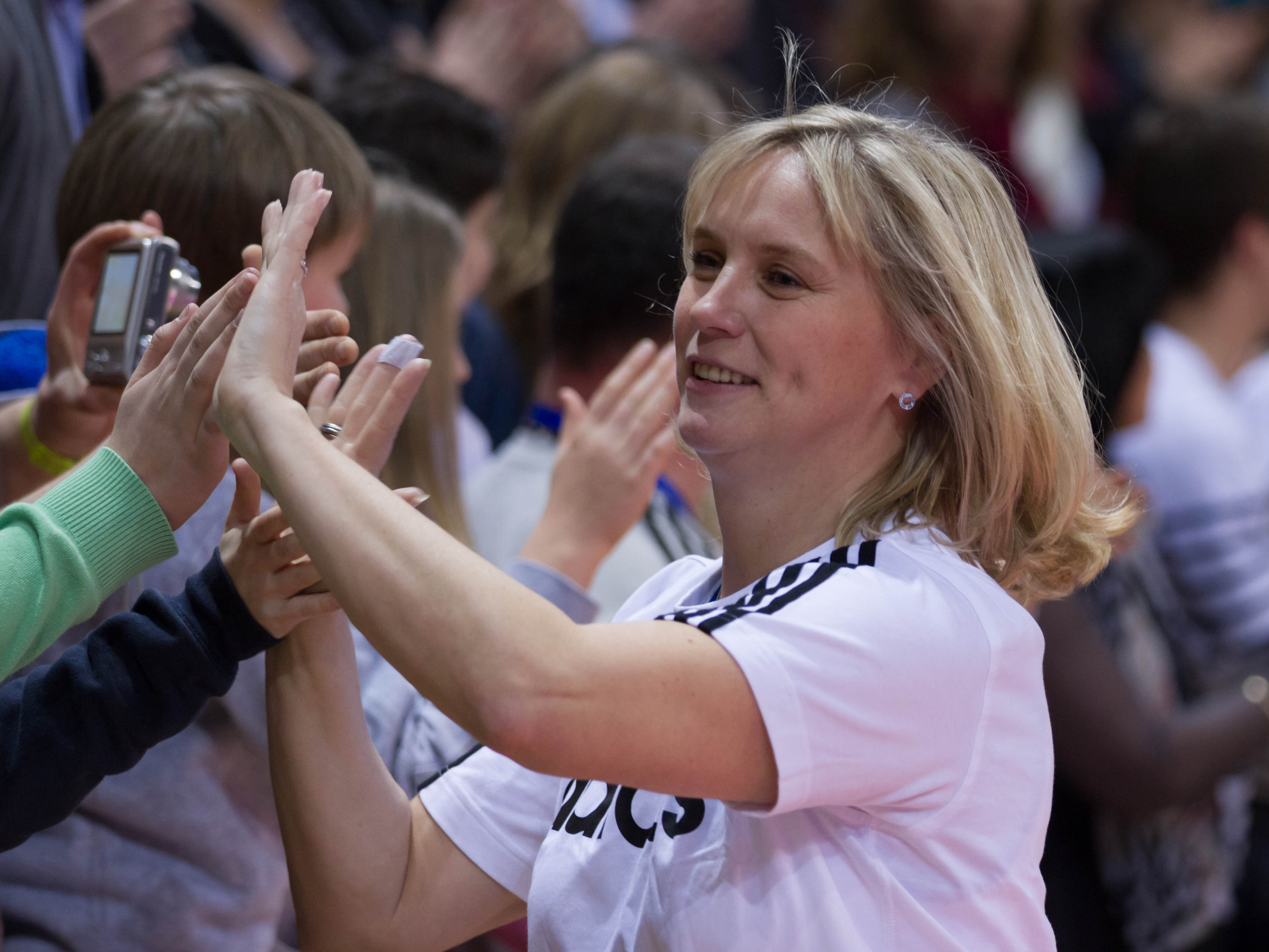

Personal information
- Born: 19 September 1969 (age 57) Toulouse, France
- Listed height: 175 cm (5 ft 9 in)
- Listed weight: 65 kg (143 lb)

Career highlights
- French Basketball Hall of Fame (2011); Glory of Sport (2013)
Medals
Representing France
EuroBasket Women
| Gold medal – first place | 2001 France | Team |
| Silver medal – second place | 1993 Italy | Team |
| Silver medal – second place | 1999 Poland | Team |

Yannick Souvré (born 19 September 1969) is a French former basketball player who competed in the 2000 Summer Olympics. She was born in Toulouse. She was inducted into the French Basketball Hall of Fame, in 2011. She was awarded with the Glory of Sport in 2013.
