= Martina Godályová =

Slovak basketball player

Martina Godályová (born 15 May 1975 in Šaľa) is a Slovak former basketball player who competed in the 2000 Summer Olympics. She also represented Slovakia ag 1994 FIBA World Championship for Women.
