= Natalya Zasulskaya =

Russian basketball player

Personal information
- Born: 28 May 1969 (age 57) Kaunas, Lithuanian SSR
- Listed height: 190 cm (6 ft 3 in)
- Listed weight: 95 kg (209 lb)

Career information
- WNBA draft: 1999: 1st round, 12th overall pick
- Drafted by: Houston Comets
- Position: Forward
- Stats at Basketball Reference
- FIBA Hall of Fame
Medals
Women's basketball
Representing the Soviet Union
Bronze medal – third place	1988 Seoul	Team competition
Representing the Unified Team
Gold medal – first place	1992 Barcelona	Team competition

Natalya Zasulskaya (born 28 May 1969 in Kaunas, Lithuanian SSR) is a Russian former basketball player who competed in the 1988 Summer Olympics, in the 1992 Summer Olympics, and in the 2000 Summer Olympics. She was inducted into the FIBA Hall of Fame, in 2010.
