= Slávka Frniaková =

Slovak basketball player

Slávka Frniaková (born 9 March 1979 in Žilina) is a Slovak former basketball player who competed in the 2000 Summer Olympics.
